= Florida State Seminoles football =

Team representing Florida State University in American football

2026 Florida State Seminoles football team
- First season: 1902; 124 years ago (Note: The school played three seasons as Florida State College from 1902 to 1904 and resumed playing as Florida State University in 1947; 79 years ago.)
- Athletic director: Jeff Purinton
- General manager: John Garrett
- Head coach: Rick Stockstill (Interim)
- Location: Tallahassee, Florida
- Stadium: Doak Campbell Stadium (capacity: 67,277)
- Field: Bobby Bowden Field
- NCAA division: Division I FBS
- Conference: ACC
- Colors: Garnet and gold
- All-time record: 594–304–17 (.658)
- CFP record: 0–1 (.000)
- Bowl record: 29–18–3 (.610)

National championships
- Claimed: 1993, 1999, 2013
- Unclaimed: 1980, 1987, 1989, 1992, 1994, 1996

National finalist
- Bowl Coalition: 1993
- Bowl Alliance: 1996
- BCS: 1998, 1999, 2000, 2013

College Football Playoff appearances
- 2014

Conference championships
- Dixie: 1948, 1949, 1950 ACC: 1992, 1993, 1994, 1995, 1996, 1997, 1998, 1999, 2000, 2002, 2003, 2005, 2012, 2013, 2014, 2023

Division championships
- ACC Atlantic: 2005, 2008, 2010, 2012, 2013, 2014
- Heisman winners: Charlie Ward – 1993; Chris Weinke – 2000; Jameis Winston – 2013
- Consensus All-Americans: 46
- Rivalries: Florida (rivalry); Miami (rivalry); Clemson (rivalry); Virginia (rivalry)

Uniforms
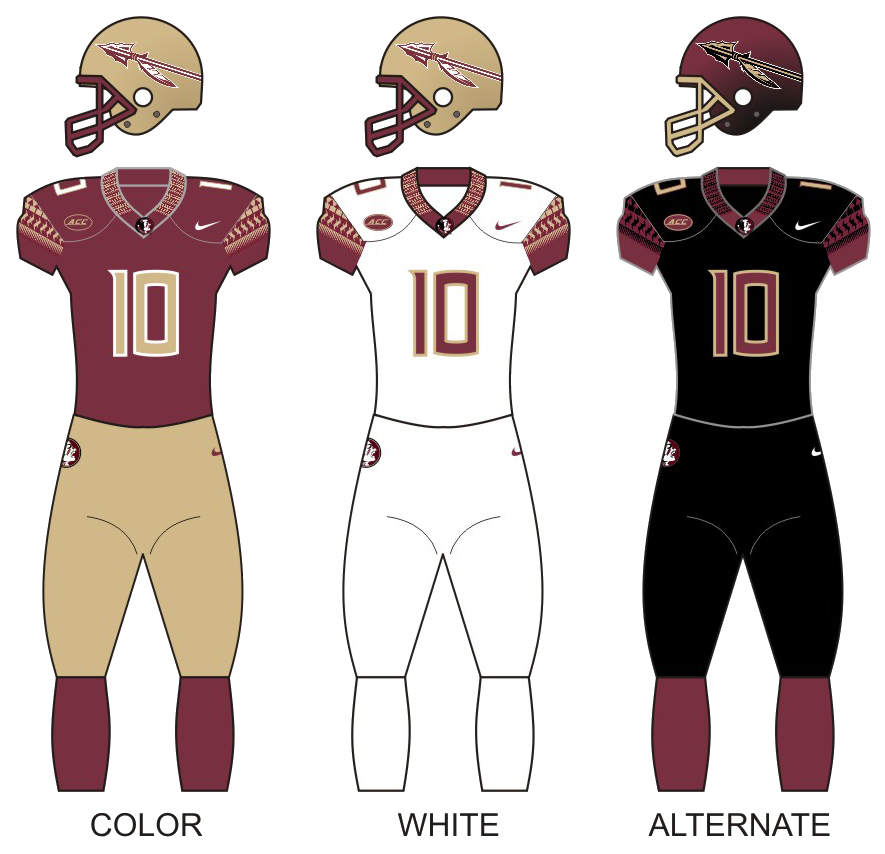
- Fight song: FSU Fight Song
- Mascot: Osceola and Renegade
- Marching band: Marching Chiefs
- Outfitter: Nike
- Website: Seminoles.com

The Florida State Seminoles football team represents Florida State University (variously Florida State or FSU) in the sport of American football. The Seminoles compete in the NCAA Division I Football Bowl Subdivision (FBS) of the National Collegiate Athletic Association (NCAA) and the Atlantic Coast Conference (ACC). The team is currently coached by interim coach Rick Stockstill, and plays home games at Doak Campbell Stadium, the 26th largest stadium in college football, located on-campus in Tallahassee, Florida. The team's general manager is John Garrett. The Seminoles previously competed as part of the ACC Atlantic Division.

Florida State has won three national championships, nineteen conference titles (three Dixie, sixteen ACC), and six division titles and have made one playoff appearance; the Seminoles have achieved three undefeated seasons, in 1950, 1999, and 2013. Other accomplishments include finishing ranked in the top four of the AP Poll for 14 straight years from 1987 through 2000, completing 41 straight winning seasons from 1977 through 2017, winning 29 consecutive games from 2012 through 2014, tied for the ninth-longest winning streak in college football and tied for the longest winning streak in ACC history, and also winning 29 consecutive conference games from 1992 through 1995, the longest winning streak in ACC history. The 1999 team was recognized by ESPN as one of the top teams in college football history.

The team has produced three Heisman Trophy winners: quarterbacks Charlie Ward in 1993, Chris Weinke in 2000 and Jameis Winston in 2013. The program has produced 224 All-Americans (46 consensus and 15 unanimous) and over 300 professional players, including two Super Bowl MVPs and 106 Pro Bowl selections. Florida State has had nine members inducted into the College Football Hall of Fame, two members inducted into the College Football Coaches Hall of Fame and five members inducted into the Pro Football Hall of Fame. The Biletnikoff Award, presented annually to the top receiver in college football, is named for Florida State hall of fame player Fred Biletnikoff and the Bobby Bowden Award, presented by the Fellowship of Christian Athletes, is named after Florida State hall of fame coach Bobby Bowden.

The Florida State Seminoles have the twelfth-highest winning percentage among all college football programs in Division I FBS history with over 500 victories and twenty-six ten win seasons. Florida State has appeared in over 50 postseason bowl games, ranking ninth nationally for bowl winning percentage and fourth for bowl wins with five Orange Bowl victories.

== History ==
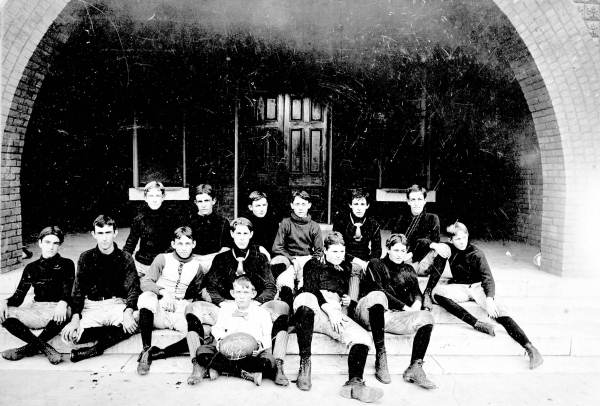
Florida State has had a football team since as early as the 1890s.

Florida State's football program was first established in 1902, resuming play and adopting the 'Seminole' nickname in 1947, after forty-six years. The Seminoles joined the Atlantic Coast Conference in 1992, following a long history of competing independently.

=== Florida State College ===
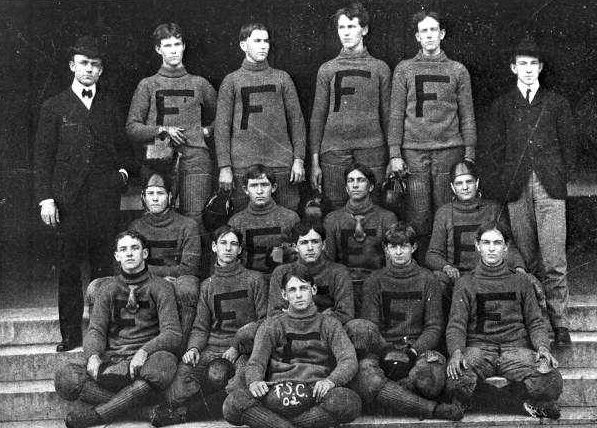
Florida State College football in 1902

Florida State University traces the start of its athletic program to 1902, when Florida State College played the first of its three seasons. From 1902 to 1904, the institution then known as Florida State College fielded a varsity football team called "The Eleven" that played other teams. The Florida State players wore gold uniforms.

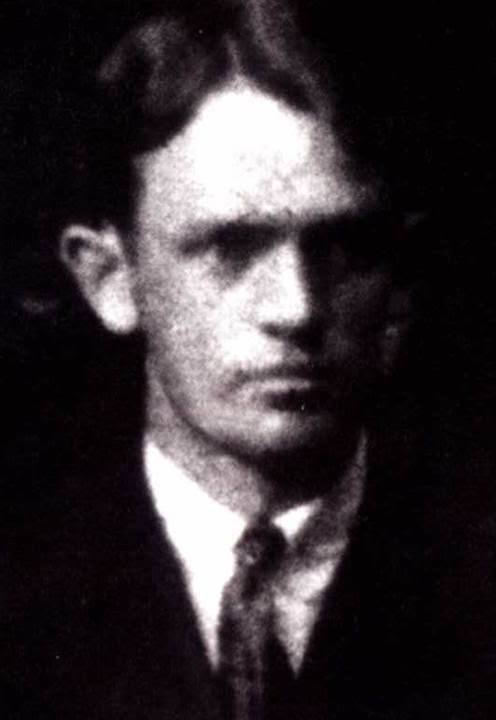
Jack Forsythe served as the head coach of Florida State College in its final season.

W. W. Hughes, professor of Latin and the head of men's sports at the school, served as the first coach. They played their first game against the Bainbridge Giants, a city team from Bainbridge, Georgia, defeating them 5–0. The team then played back-to-back matches against Florida Agricultural College (which later merged into what is now the University of Florida) one week apart, winning the first 6–0 and losing the second 0–6. The following season student enthusiasm grew even more, and the Eleven arranged a full schedule of six games. They competed against teams such as the University of Florida in Lake City (as Florida Agricultural College was then called), Georgia Tech, and the East Florida Seminary (another school that merged into the University of Florida), and finished the season by competing against Stetson College in Jacksonville for The Florida Times-Union's Championship Cup. The following year, Jack Forsythe, later the first head coach of the Florida Gators, replaced Hughes as coach, and the Eleven won the unofficial "state championship" by defeating Stetson in Tallahassee. Jock Hanvey assisted Forsythe.

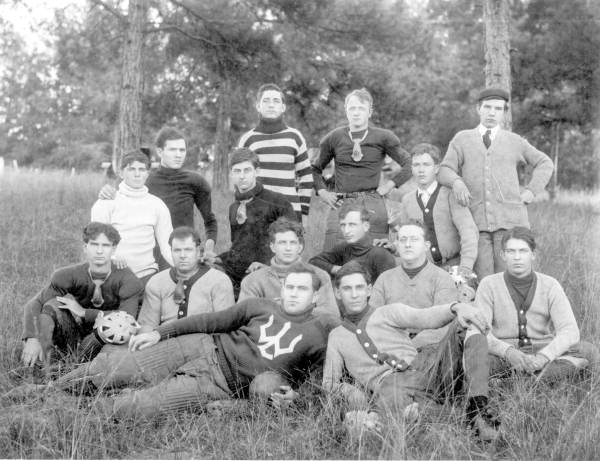
Florida State College football in 1904

This would be The Eleven's last season, however, as the Florida State Legislature passed the Buckman Act, which reorganized Florida's six colleges into three institutions segregated by gender and race: a school for white males, a school for white females, and a school for African Americans. Florida State College became Florida Female College until 1909, when it became Florida State College for Women. Four other institutions (including the University of Florida in Lake City and the East Florida Seminary) were merged into the new white men's-only University of the State of Florida in Gainesville. Males who formerly attended Florida State College were required to transfer to the Gainesville campus, although several former FSC players transferred to Grant University (now the University of Tennessee at Chattanooga), with five joining Grant's football team. In 1909 several veterans of the FSC Eleven founded a city team named the Tallahassee Athletics, but this folded after one season. Except for this, until 1947, Tallahassee's only organized or collegiate football team were the team from the Florida Agricultural and Mechanical College for Negroes (now Florida A&M University).

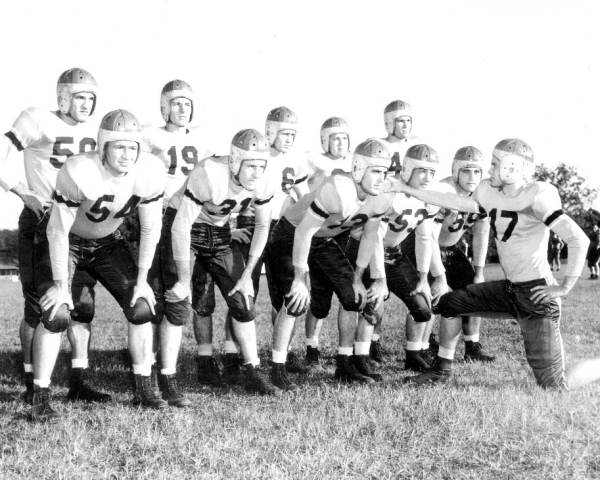
The inaugural Florida State University football team

=== Early history (1947–1975) ===
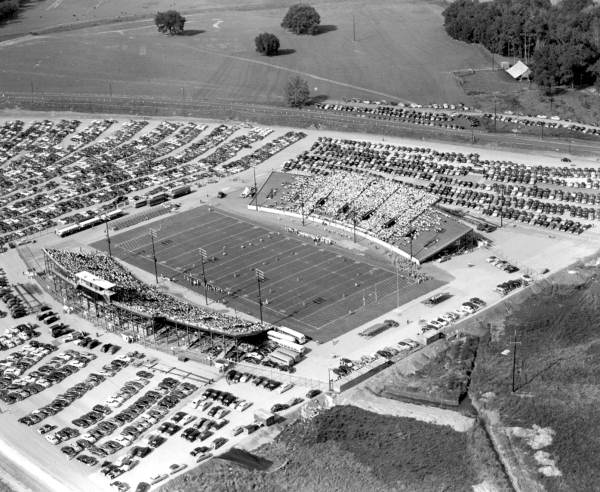
Following the program's revival in 1947, Doak Campbell Stadium was opened during the 1950 season.

The end of World War II brought enormous pressure on the university system in Florida, which saw an influx of veterans applying for college under the GI Bill. The Florida Legislature responded by renaming the Florida State College for Women to Florida State University and allowing men to attend the university for the first time since 1905; football then returned to the university, beginning with the 1947 season. From 1948 through 1959, the Seminole football program achieved much success under coaches Don Veller and Tom Nugent. Ed Williamson, who introduced football to the school, served as the first coach of the Florida State Seminoles. In his first and only season with Florida State, the Seminoles posted an 0–5 record. Williamson has the worst record out of all the head coaches at Florida State and is the only coach to have a winless mark. As the second coach at Florida State, Don Veller coached at Florida State for five years and compiled a record of 31–12–1. Veller was the first coach to find success coaching the Seminoles. In 1950, Veller led the Seminoles to an 8–0 record, the first unbeaten season in school history. Once Veller left the school, Tom Nugent became the third coach at Florida State. He stayed at Florida State for six years and compiled a record of 34–28–1. In one of his most notable accomplishments, Nugent gave the Seminoles their first win over an SEC opponent with a 10–0 victory against Tennessee in 1958. The fourth coach at Florida State was Perry Moss who coached the Seminoles for one year after compiling a 4–6 record. He became the second Florida State coach to leave the school with a losing record and the second to coach at the school for only one season after leaving to coach in the CFL.

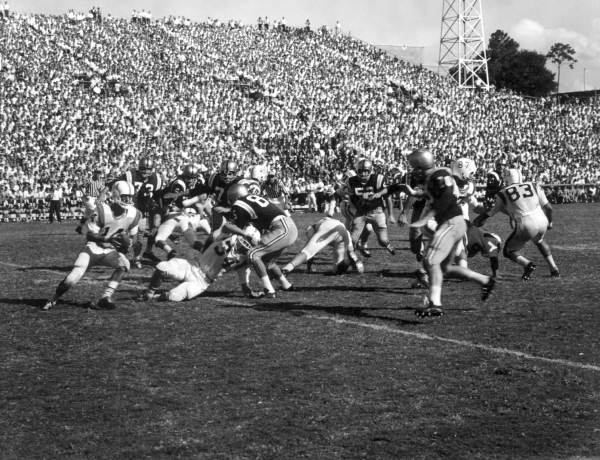
Under Peterson, the Seminoles defeated the Gators for the first time.

With the arrival of head coach Bill Peterson in 1960, the Seminoles began their move to national prominence. Under Peterson's direction, the Seminoles beat the Florida Gators for the first time in 1964 and earned their first major bowl bid. Peterson also led the Seminoles to their first ever top ten ranking. During his tenure as head coach, Peterson also gave a young assistant by the name of Bobby Bowden his first major college coaching opportunity. Although not widely known, the Seminoles achieved their first ever number one ranking during this period. In October 1964, the Dunkel College Football Index, a popular power index of that era, placed the Seminoles at the top of their poll after a stunning 48–6 win over highly ranked Kentucky (AP No. 5, Dunkel No. 3). Peterson would be named UPI national coach of the week after this program changing victory. In an era of very few bowl games, Peterson's innovative offensive system helped earn the Seminoles four bowl bids from 1964 through 1968. During this time, only Alabama and Mississippi appeared in more bowl games than did Peterson's Seminoles. Receiving a football scholarship, famed actor Robert Urich was a back up center on the Seminoles from 1964 to 1967. In 1968, Peterson's eighth year at the helm, the Seminoles claimed their third straight bowl bid as Florida State became the first major college in the state of Florida to earn such a distinction. The Seminoles would not repeat this feat again until the ninth season of the Bobby Bowden era.

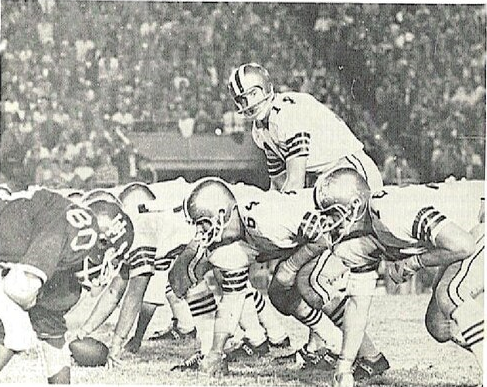
The Seminoles, with quarterback Bill Cappleman, playing Houston during the 1968 season.

In the summer of 1967, Peterson also engineered another first for the Seminole program when he decided to begin the recruitment of African American football players. Apparently, he did so without approval from either the school president or its athletic director. On December 16, 1967, the Seminoles signed Ernest Cook, a fullback from Daytona Beach. Several months later, the Seminoles would sign running back Calvin Patterson from Dade County. Ultimately, Cook decided to switch his allegiance to Minnesota where he would become an All-Big Ten running back. In the fall of 1968, Patterson would become the first African American student to play for the Seminoles as a starter for the Florida State freshmen football team. In the fall of 1970, J. T. Thomas would become the first African American to play in a varsity game for the Seminoles.

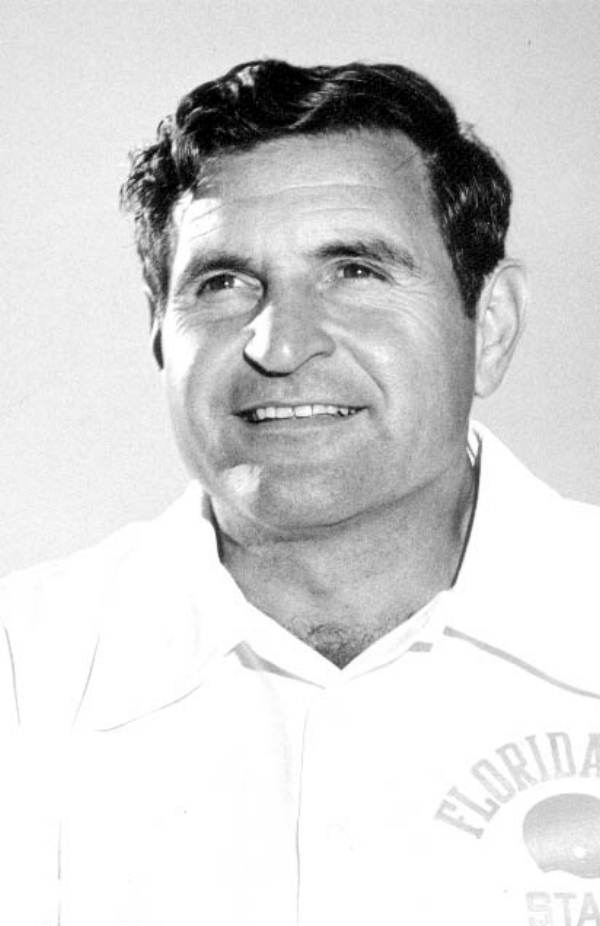
Darrell Mudra was inducted into the College Football Hall of Fame.

Following Peterson's successful run, the next two coaches had disappointing tenures. Larry Jones was appointed as the sixth head coach at Florida State. Jones coached for three years from 1971 to 1973 and compiled a record of 15–19, becoming the third Florida State coach to have a losing record. Darrell Mudra was then hired to be the seventh coach of the Seminoles. Mudra lasted just two years from 1974 to 1975 and compiled a record of 4–18. He became the fourth head coach to have a losing record at Florida State.

=== Bobby Bowden era (1976–2009) ===
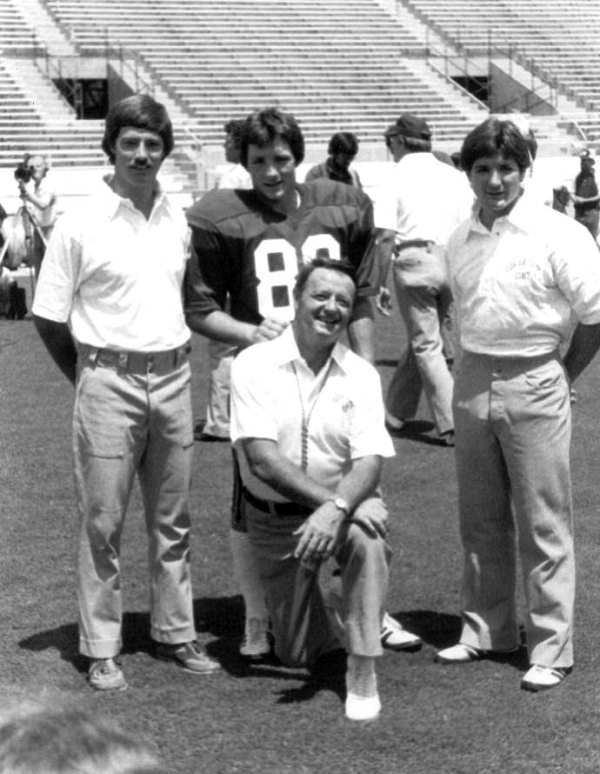
Bowden is credited with Florida State's rise to prominence.

Under head coach Bobby Bowden, who came to Florida State from West Virginia, the Seminoles became one of the nation's most competitive programs, greatly expanding the tradition of football at Florida State. The Seminoles played in five national championship games between 1993 and 2000, and claimed the championship twice, in 1993 and 1999. The FSU football team was the most successful team in college football during the 1990s, boasting an 89% winning percentage. FSU also set an NCAA record for most consecutive Top 5 finishes in the AP football poll – receiving placement 14 years in a row, from 1987 to 2000. The Seminoles under Bowden were the first college football team in history to be ranked first place wire-to-wire (i.e., from preseason to postseason) since the AP began releasing preseason rankings in 1936.

In the Bowden era, prior to a 1989 game against long-standing rival Miami, University of Miami mascot Sebastian the Ibis was tackled by a group of police officers at Doak Campbell Stadium in Tallahassee as the mascot attempted to put out Chief Osceola's flaming spear. Sebastian was wearing a fireman's helmet and yellow raincoat and holding a fire extinguisher. When a police officer attempted to grab the fire extinguisher, the officer was sprayed in the chest. Sebastian was handcuffed by four officers but ultimately released. University of Miami quarterback Gino Torretta told ESPN, "Even if we weren't bad boys, it added to the mystique that, 'Man, look, even their mascot's getting arrested.'" In the late 1980s and throughout the 1990s, the Seminoles had 14 consecutive seasons with 10 or more wins and a top four finish, with a record of 152–19–1 between these years (11 of their 19 losses were decided by seven points or less), and one of the best home records of the era. FSU's accomplishments in these 14 seasons included eleven bowl wins, nine ACC championships, two Heisman Trophy winners, and two national championships.

On December 1, 2009, Bowden announced that he would retire from coaching after the Seminoles' game on New Year's Day 2010 against West Virginia, Bowden's former team, in the Gator Bowl. His legacy has led to the creation of two awards in his honor, the Bobby Bowden Award, an award presented to college football players, and the Bobby Bowden National Collegiate Coach of the Year Award, an award presented to college football coaches. In the spring of 2007, several FSU athletes including football players were accused of cheating in an online music history class. As a result of the Florida State University academic-athletic scandal, the NCAA announced that it would reduce scholarship limits in 10 sports and force Florida State to vacate all of the victories in 2006 and 2007 in which the implicated athletes participated and placed the university on probation for four years. FSU vacated 12 football victories from the 2006 and 2007 seasons and Bowden finished his career with 377 career wins.

=== Post-Bowden years (2010–present) ===
Coach Fisher led the Seminoles to the 2013 national title.

On January 5, 2010, Jimbo Fisher officially became the ninth head football coach in Florida State history. Fisher had been a member of the Florida State staff for three years, serving as offensive coordinator. He was named head coach-in waiting during the 2008 season. In his first season as head coach, Florida State went 10–4 with a 6–2 record in ACC conference play. The Seminoles went to their first ACC Championship Game since 2005, losing to Virginia Tech 44–33, and had their first ten win season since 2003. Fisher's first Florida State team notably beat both of its in-state rivals, the Miami Hurricanes and the Florida Gators, for the first time since 1999. Florida State would go on to the Chick-fil-A Bowl, where they would beat Steve Spurrier's South Carolina team. In his second season, Florida State went 9–4 with a 5–3 record in ACC conference play. For the second year in a row, the Seminoles defeated both of their in-state rivals. Fisher's second Florida State team also defeated Notre Dame in the Champs Sports Bowl. In his third season, he led the Seminoles to their first conference title in seven years and defeated Northern Illinois to win the Orange Bowl. In the 2013 season, Jimbo Fisher guided his team to a perfect 14–0 record and a national championship with a comeback win against Auburn. In 2014, he guided Florida State to another undefeated regular season, only to be defeated by Oregon 59–20 in the Rose Bowl, the most points the Seminoles had ever surrendered in a bowl game. Florida State had victories over both in-state rivals, Florida and Miami, in six of Jimbo Fisher's first seven seasons as head coach and won ten or more games in six of his eight seasons. While the Seminoles would win at least 10 games in the next two seasons and even finished eighth in the final 2016 poll, they lost five games in ACC play–one fewer than they had lost in Fisher's first five seasons. One of those losses was a 63–20 rout at the hands of Louisville, the most points Florida State had ever surrendered at the time. In 2017, the Seminoles were ranked third in preseason polls, but a 24–7 drubbing by Alabama and a close loss to NC State knocked them out of the polls altogether for the first time since the middle of the 2011 season, and ultimately finished with their first losing on-field record in ACC play since joining the league.

Haggins has served as interim coach on two occasions, after Fisher's resignation and again after Taggart's firing.

Fisher resigned as FSU head coach on December 1, 2017, to accept a record ten-year, $75 million contract to become head coach at Texas A&M. Defensive line coach and former defensive lineman Odell Haggins was named interim head coach, becoming Florida State's first African-American head coach, and coached in his first game the next day against Louisiana-Monroe. The Seminoles won, extending their bowl streak to an NCAA record 36 seasons. He went on to coach the Seminoles in the bowl game, leading them to a win and their 41st consecutive winning season.

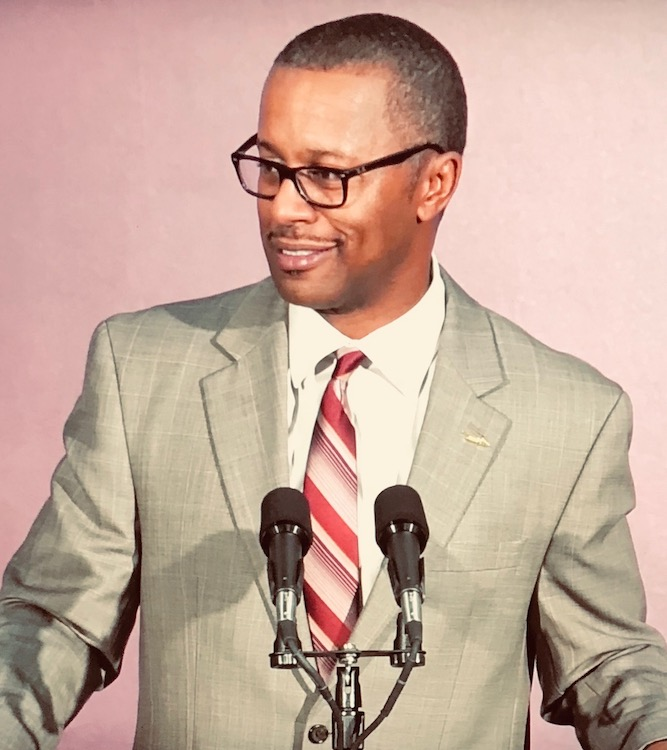
Former head coach Willie Taggart at his introductory press conference

On December 5, 2017, Willie Taggart left Oregon to become the new head coach at Florida State. In his first season, the Seminoles finished with a losing record for the first time since 1976 and missed a bowl game for the first time in 36 years. On November 3, 2019, Taggart was fired following a loss to Miami and a 4–5 record throughout the first nine games of the season. Haggins was once again named interim head coach to finish out the season.

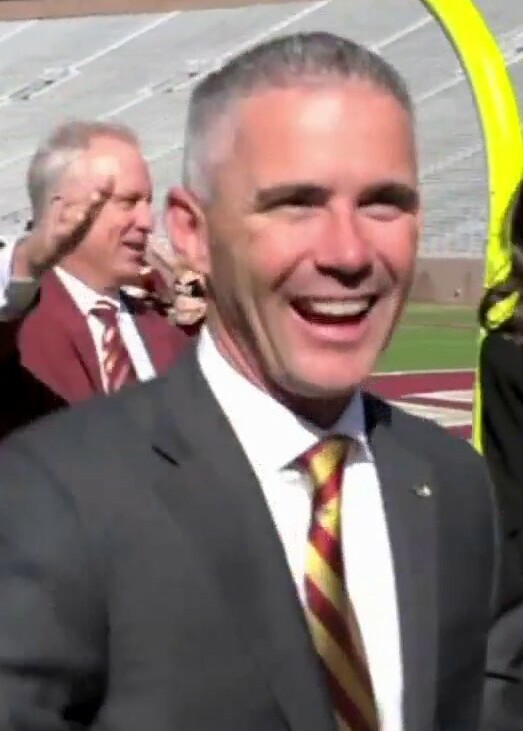
Mike Norvell was the coach of the 2023 ACC championship team.

On December 8, 2019, Memphis head coach Mike Norvell was named the new head coach at Florida State. On September 11, 2021, the Seminoles lost to Jacksonville State; it was the first time Florida State had lost to a non-FBS opponent since 1959. In 2022, Mike Norvell led the Seminoles to a 9–3 regular season record and a berth in the 2022 Cheez-It Bowl to play against Oklahoma. Florida State moved up in the AP Poll during the season for the first time since 2016, peaking at #13 prior to the bowl game and winning the most regular season games for the first time since that season as well. The Seminoles would go on to defeat the Sooners to finish with ten wins for the first time in six years. In his fourth season, Norvell guided the Seminoles to an undefeated regular season and a conference championship.

The 2023 team was excluded from the College Football Playoff despite finishing the regular season as undefeated ACC champions. This made the Seminoles the first Power 5 champions of the playoff era to go undefeated but not be selected for the playoff bracket. Coach Mike Norvell said he was "disgusted" by the committee's decision. University Vice President and Athletic Director Michael Alford called the decision "unforgivable".

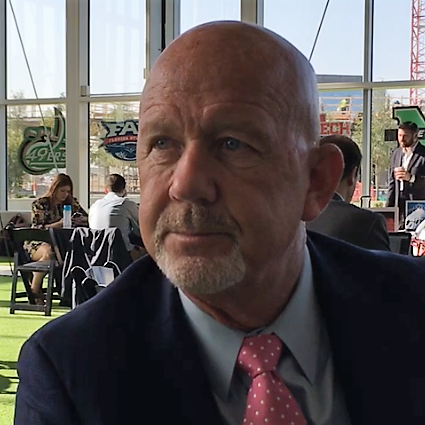
Stockstill, who played quarterback at Florida State, served as interim coach following Norvell's firing.

The 2024 season began with the team playing its first international game in school history. The Seminoles finished with their worst record since 1974 and their worst conference record in program history. The 2025 team improved upon the previous season's record, finishing 5–7 overall and 2–6 in conference play, but missed the post-season for a second consecutive year. Following a loss to Clemson, Norvell was let go eight games into the 2026 season and Rick Stockstill was named as interim coach for the remaining games.

== Doak S. Campbell Stadium ==
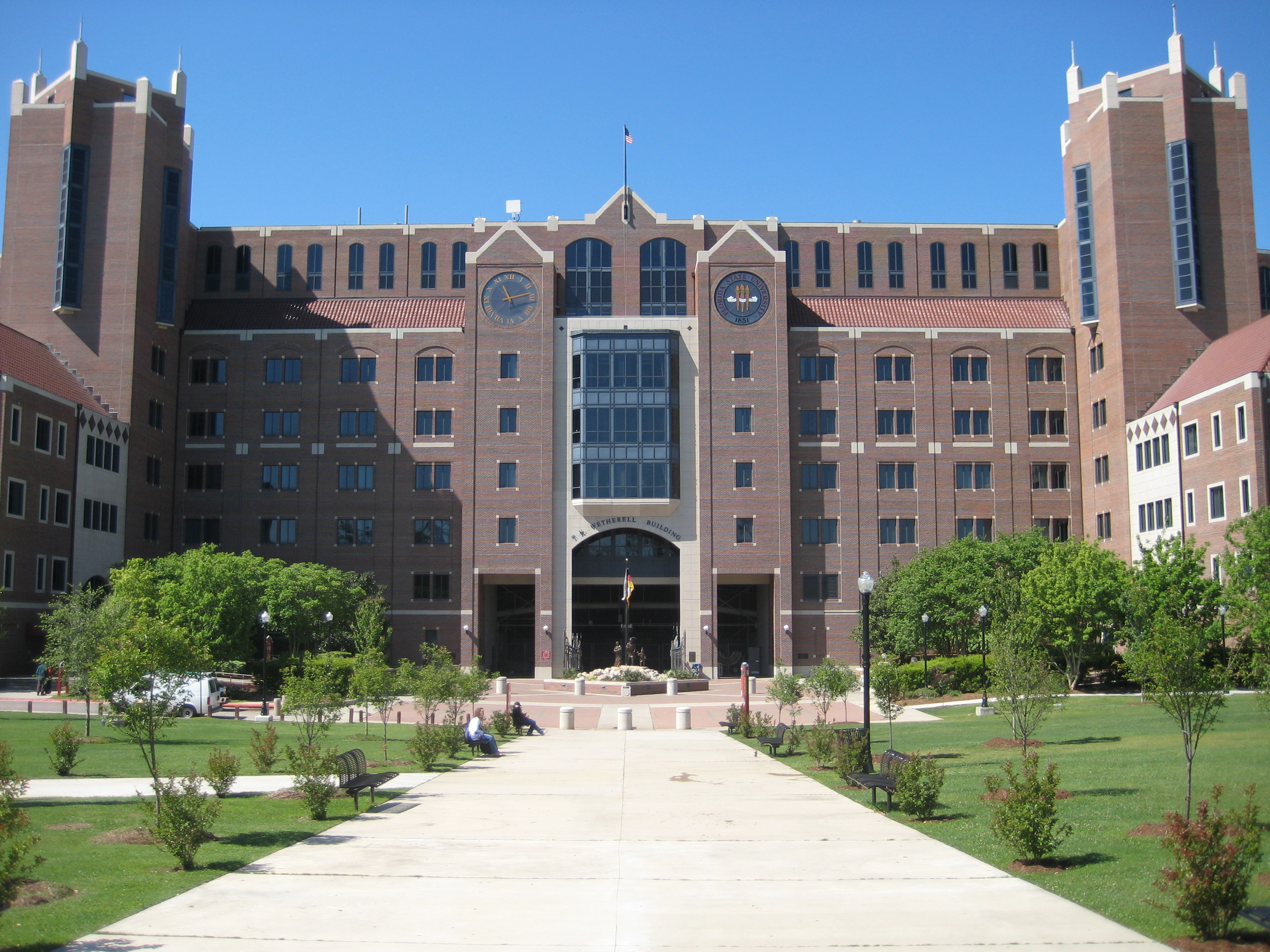
Doak Campbell Stadium has a current capacity of 67,277.

The Florida State Seminoles originally played their home games at Centennial Field until 1950. The Seminoles had an 8–4 record at Centennial, including two undefeated home records. The team play their home games at Doak Cambell Stadium, which has a capacity of 67,277, as of 2025. Florida State is 330–115–4 in 449 games played at Doak Campbell.

The stadium, named after former school president Doak Sheridan Campbell, hosted its first game against the Randolph-Macon College Yellowjackets on October 7, 1950, with the Seminoles winning the game 40–7. At that time the facility had a seating capacity of 15,000. Doak Campbell Stadium, with its original capacity of 15,000 in 1950, was built at a cost of $250,000. In 1954, the stadium grew to a capacity of 19,000. Six thousand more seats were added in 1961. During the Bill Peterson era (1960–70), the stadium was expanded to 40,500 seats, and it remained at that capacity for the next 14 years. Since that time, the stadium expanded to almost 83,000, largely due to the success of the football team under head coach Bobby Bowden coupled with the ever-growing student body. It now is the second largest football stadium in the Atlantic Coast Conference (ACC).

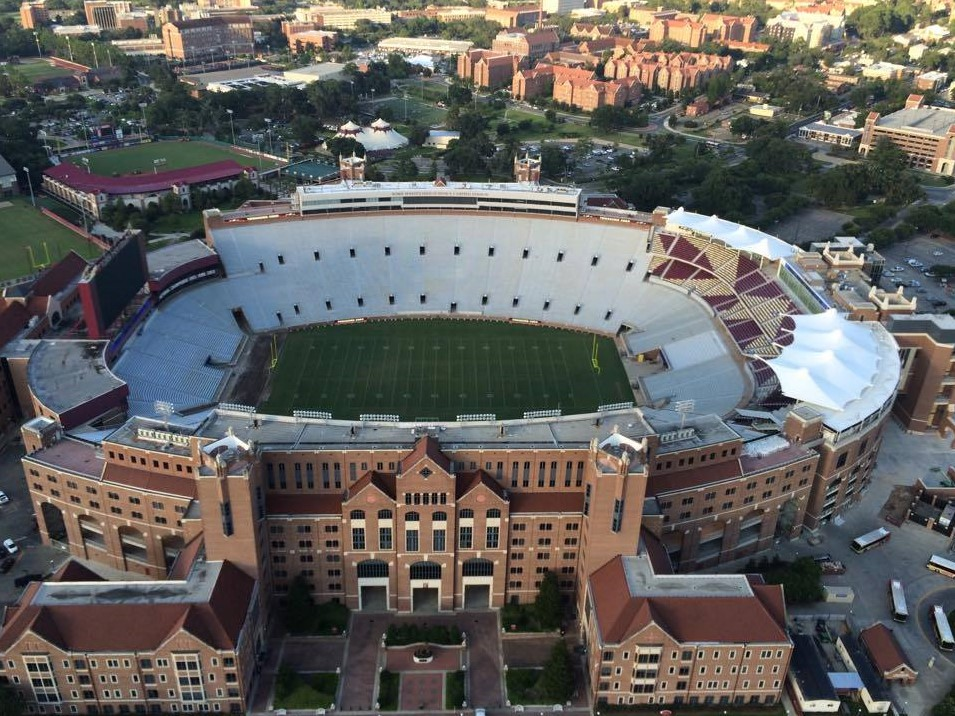
Doak Campbell Stadium hosted its first game in 1950.

Aesthetically, a brick facade surrounding the stadium matches the architectural design of most of the buildings on the university's campus. In addition to the obvious recreational uses, The University Center surrounds the stadium and houses many of the university's offices as well as The College of Motion Picture Arts, The Dedman School of Hospitality, and The College of Social Work. The field was officially named Bobby Bowden field on November 20, 2004, as Florida State hosted intrastate rival Florida. Florida State has been recognized as having one of the best gameday atmospheres in the country, and Doak Campbell Stadium has been named one of the top stadiums in college sports.

Doak Campbell Stadium has been a great home field advantage for the Noles. Florida State is one of only three schools that can boast a decade home field unbeaten streak. The Seminoles never lost a home game from 1992 to 2001, a total of 54 games, and have completed 24 undefeated seasons at their home stadiums, including 22 at Doak Campbell.

The record crowd for the stadium is 84,431; set during a game against the Notre Dame Fighting Irish on October 18, 2014.

== Championships ==
=== National championships ===
Florida State has been selected national champions in nine seasons by NCAA-designated major selectors. Florida State claims the 1993, 1999 and 2013 national championships after winning a postseason bowl national championship game and being named the national champion by all four major consensus selectors (AP, Coaches, FWAA, and NFF).

==== Claimed national championships ====
Year	Coach	Major Selectors	Record	Bowl	Final AP	Final Coaches
1993	Bobby Bowden	AP, Coaches, FWAA, NFF	12–1	Won Orange (Bowl Coalition National Championship Game)	No. 1	No. 1
1999	Bobby Bowden	BCS, AP, Coaches, FWAA, NFF	12–0	Won Sugar (BCS National Championship Game)	No. 1	No. 1
2013	Jimbo Fisher	BCS, AP, Coaches, FWAA, NFF	14–0	Won BCS National Championship Game	No. 1	No. 1

==== Unclaimed national championships ====
Year	Coach	Major Selector	Record	Bowl	Opponent	Result	Final AP	Final Coaches
1980	Bobby Bowden	FACT	10–2	Orange	Oklahoma	L 17–18	No. 5	No. 5
1987	Bobby Bowden	Berryman	11–1	Fiesta	Nebraska	W 31–28	No. 2	No. 2
1989	Bobby Bowden	Billingsley Report	10–2	Fiesta	Nebraska	W 41–17	No. 3	No. 2
1992	Bobby Bowden	Sagarin	11–1	Orange	Nebraska	W 27–14	No. 2	No. 2
1994	Bobby Bowden	Dunkel	10–1–1	Sugar	Florida	W 23–17	No. 4	No. 5
1996	Bobby Bowden	Alderson System	11–1	Sugar	Florida	L 20–52	No. 3	No. 3

==== 1993 season ====
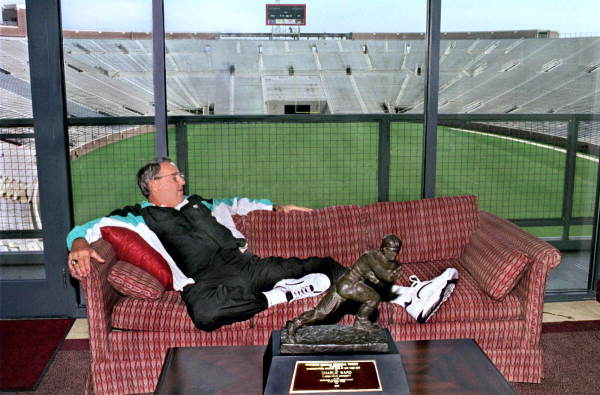
The 1993 season brought Florida State its first national title and Heisman Trophy winner.

The Seminoles entered 1993 with a number one ranking and were led by quarterback and eventual Heisman Trophy winner Charlie Ward.

Florida State cruised to a 9–0 record with their closest game being an 18-point win over Miami. The only loss of the season came at second-ranked and undefeated Notre Dame by a score of 31–24, in one of the greatest games in college football history. Despite the loss, Florida State still went on to play for the national title, beating Nebraska in the Orange Bowl with a field goal in the final seconds to claim the school's first national title.

==== 1999 season ====
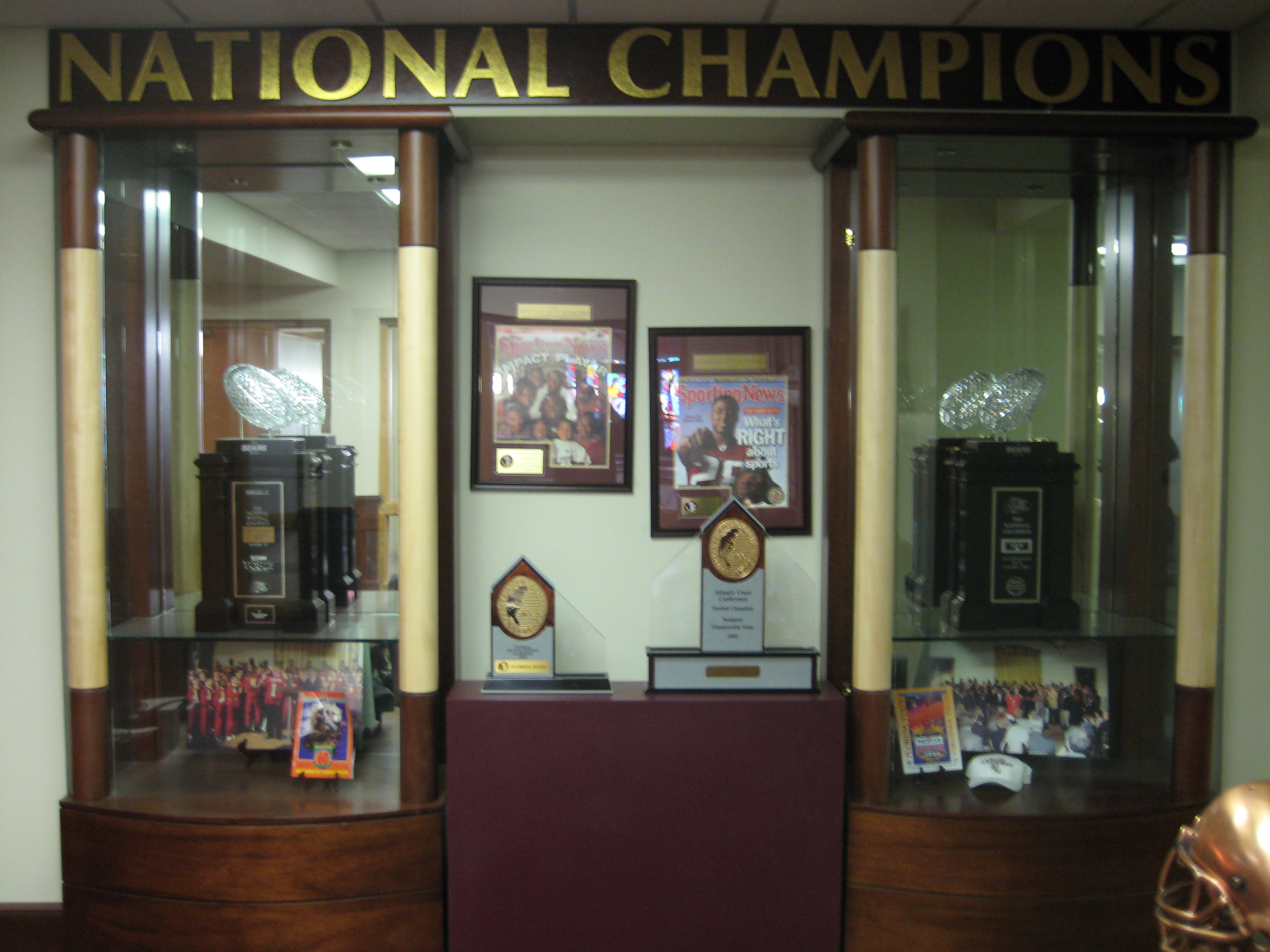
Florida State's 1993 and 1999 national championship trophies

After falling short in the national title game against Tennessee in 1998, the Seminoles began the 1999 season ranked first in the country.

Florida State would go on to complete just the second undefeated season in school history and became the first team in history to be ranked number one for an entire season. The Noles would clinch their second national title with a victory over Virginia Tech in the Sugar Bowl.

==== 2013 season ====
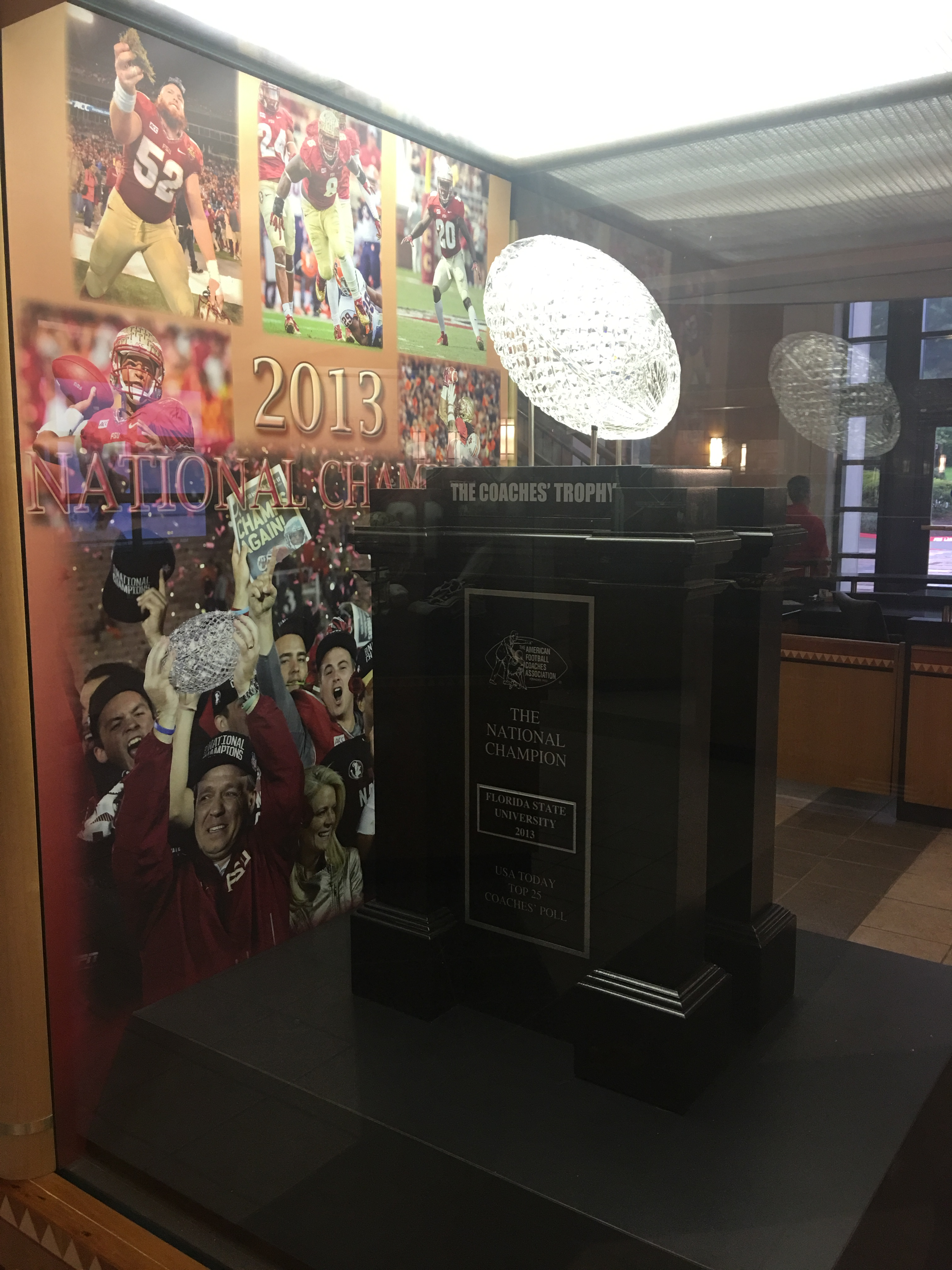
Florida State's 2013 national championship trophy

After the 2012 season, FSU lost six coaches including defensive coordinator Mark Stoops. Despite the numerous coaching changes and off the field incidents, Florida State would go on to become the highest scoring team in FBS history by scoring 723 points in a single season en route to their third national championship. The record has since been broken by the 2019 LSU Tigers, with a new lead of 726 points.

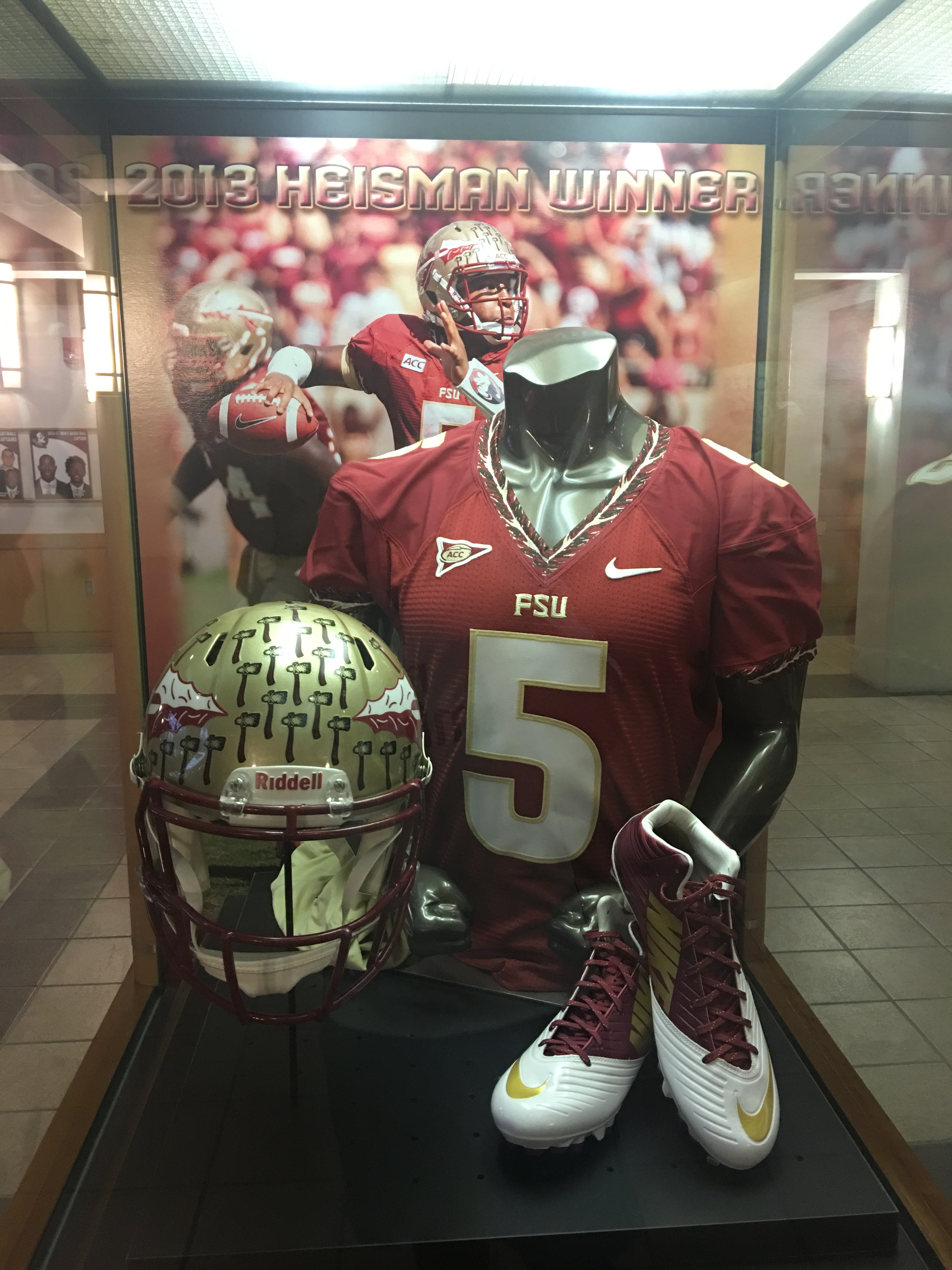
During the 2013 season, quarterback Jameis Winston became the third Florida State player to win the Heisman.

The 2013 Seminoles would hand then third ranked Clemson their worst home loss, set a new attendance record at Doak Campbell Stadium of 84,409 against the seventh ranked Miami Hurricanes, and set a school scoring record of 80 points in a game against the University of Idaho behind freshman quarterback and eventual Heisman Trophy winner Jameis Winston.

=== Conference championships ===
ACC Title trophies

Season	Conference	Coach	Overall	Conference
1948	Dixie	Don Veller	7–1	4–0
1949	Dixie	Don Veller	9–1	4–0
1950	Dixie	Don Veller	8–0	2–0
1992	ACC	Bobby Bowden	11–1	8–0
1993	ACC	Bobby Bowden	12–1	8–0
1994	ACC	Bobby Bowden	10–1–1	8–0
1995†	ACC	Bobby Bowden	10–2	7–1
1996	ACC	Bobby Bowden	11–1	8–0
1997	ACC	Bobby Bowden	11–1	8–0
1998†	ACC	Bobby Bowden	11–2	7–1
1999	ACC	Bobby Bowden	12–0	8–0
2000	ACC	Bobby Bowden	11–2	8–0
2002	ACC	Bobby Bowden	9–5	7–1
2003	ACC	Bobby Bowden	10–3	7–1
2005	ACC	Bobby Bowden	8–5	5–3
2012	ACC	Jimbo Fisher	12–2	7–1
2013	ACC	Jimbo Fisher	14–0	8–0
2014	ACC	Jimbo Fisher	13–1	8–0
2023	ACC	Mike Norvell	13–1	8–0

† Co-champions

=== Division championships ===
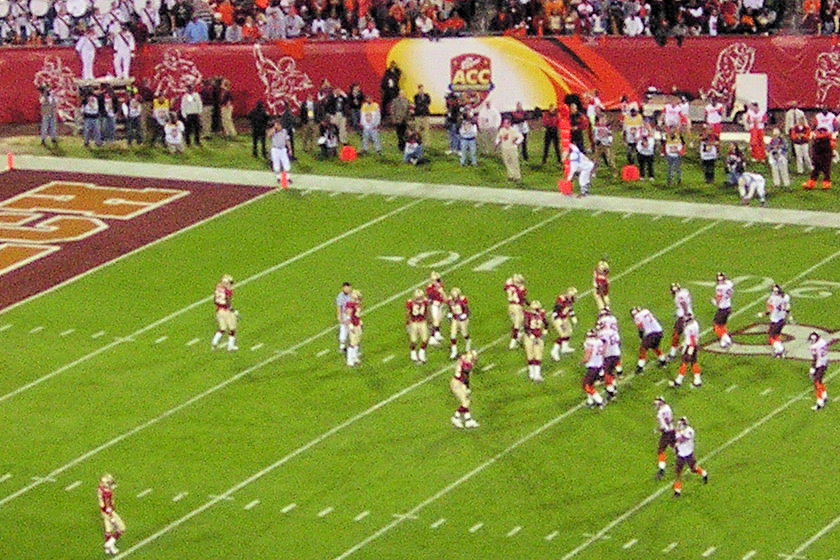
Florida State has appeared in the ACC Championship Game on six occasions, winning five times.

Year	Division	Coach	Opponent	ACC CG Result
2005†	ACC Atlantic	Bobby Bowden	Virginia Tech	W 27–22
2008†	ACC Atlantic	Bobby Bowden	Lost tiebreaker to Boston College	
2010	ACC Atlantic	Jimbo Fisher	Virginia Tech	L 33–44
2012†	ACC Atlantic	Jimbo Fisher	Georgia Tech	W 21–15
2013	ACC Atlantic	Jimbo Fisher	Duke	W 45–7
2014	ACC Atlantic	Jimbo Fisher	Georgia Tech	W 37–35

† Co-champions

Conference affiliations

In the first year of the program, Florida State competed as an independent program without conference affiliation. They were members of the Dixie Conference for three years before returning to independence. They would remain this way until 1992 when, after being courted by several conferences including the Southeastern Conference, they opted to join the Atlantic Coast Conference which is the same conference that they compete in today.

- Southern Intercollegiate Athletic Association (1902–1904)
- Independent (1947)
- Dixie Conference (1948–1950)
- Independent (1951–1991)
- Atlantic Coast Conference (1992–present)
  - Atlantic Division (2005–2022)

== Records and results ==
=== Head coaches ===
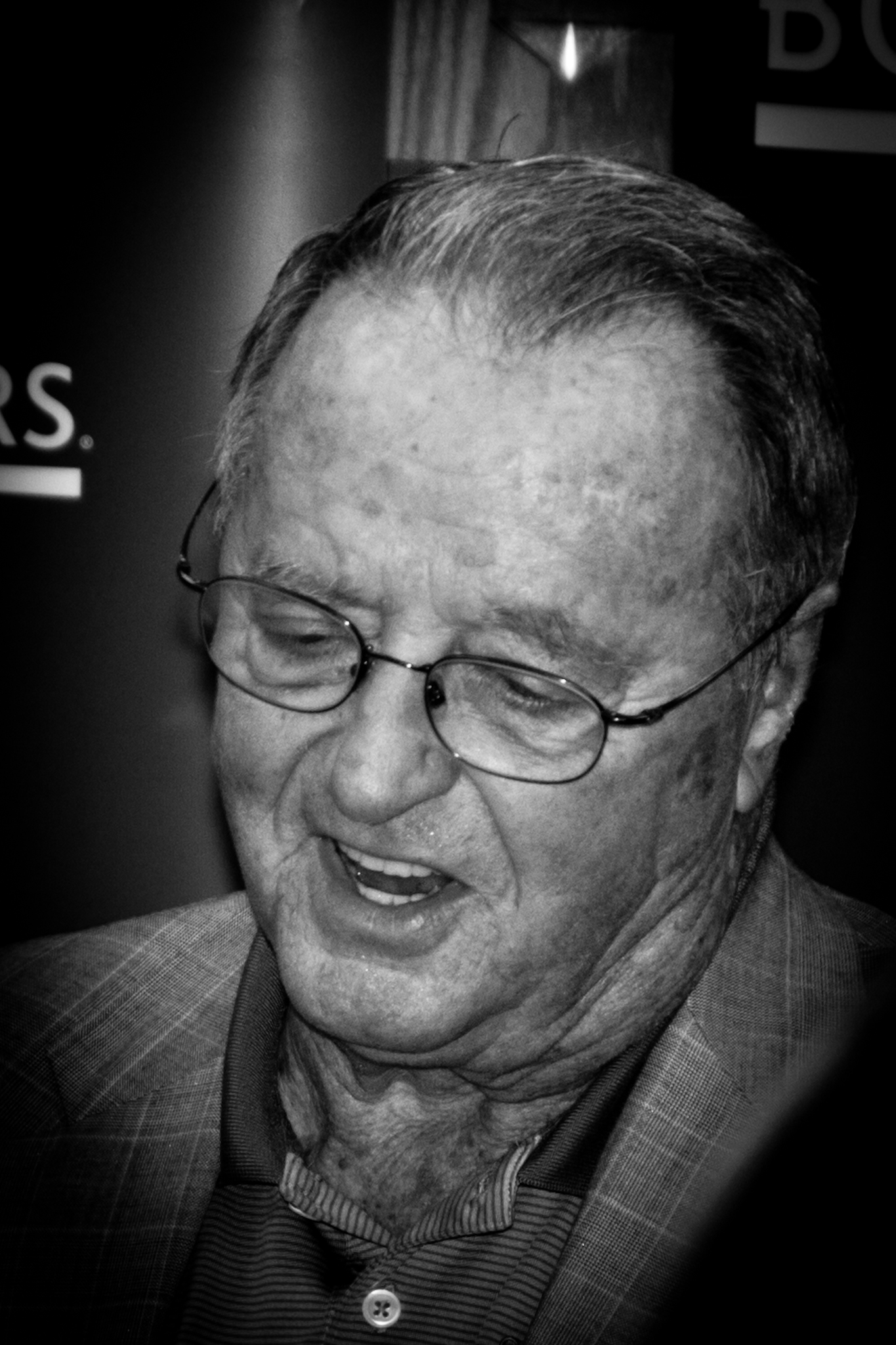
Bowden is the winningest coach in school history.

Florida State has had 14 head coaches since organized football began in 1902. Bobby Bowden, who spent 34 years at Florida State, is the winningest coach in school history and has been inducted into the College Football Hall of Fame. During his tenure, Bobby Bowden won two national championships with the Seminoles, while Jimbo Fisher won one. Fisher and Bowden also have the second and third best ACC winning percentages in conference history.

Tenure	Coach	Years	Record	Pct.	Bowl Games
1902–1903	W. W. Hughes	2	5–3–1	.611	0–0–1
1904	Jack Forsythe	1	2–3	.400	
1947	Ed Williamson	1	0–5	.000	
1948–1952	Don Veller	5	31–12–1	.716	1–0
1953–1958	Tom Nugent	6	34–28–1	.548	0–2
1959	Perry Moss	1	4–6	.400	
1960–1970	Bill Peterson	11	62–42–11	.587	1–2–1
1971–1973	Larry Jones	3	15–19	.441	0–1
1974–1975	Darrell Mudra	2	4–18	.182	
1976–2009	Bobby Bowden	34	304–97–4^{‡}	.756	20–9–1^{‡}
2010–2017	Jimbo Fisher	8	83–23	.783	5–2
2017, 2019	Odell Haggins†	2	4–2	.667	1–1
2018–2019	Willie Taggart	2	9–12	.429	
2020–2026	Mike Norvell	7	41–39	.513	1–1
2026	Rick Stockstill†	1	2–1	.667	

† Interim head coach

‡ Bobby Bowden's record omits 12 vacated victories including 1 bowl victory, that would otherwise make his record 316–97–4.

=== Bowl games ===
This is a partial list of the ten most recent bowl games Florida State has competed in.

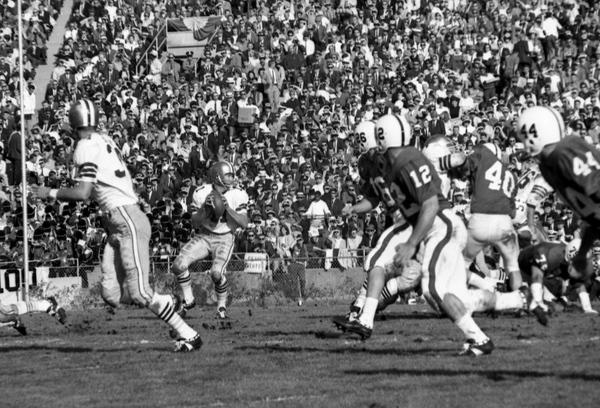
FSU in the 1967 Gator Bowl vs. Penn State

Florida State has played in 50 bowl games in its history and has a 29–18–3 record, with one win vacated, in those games.

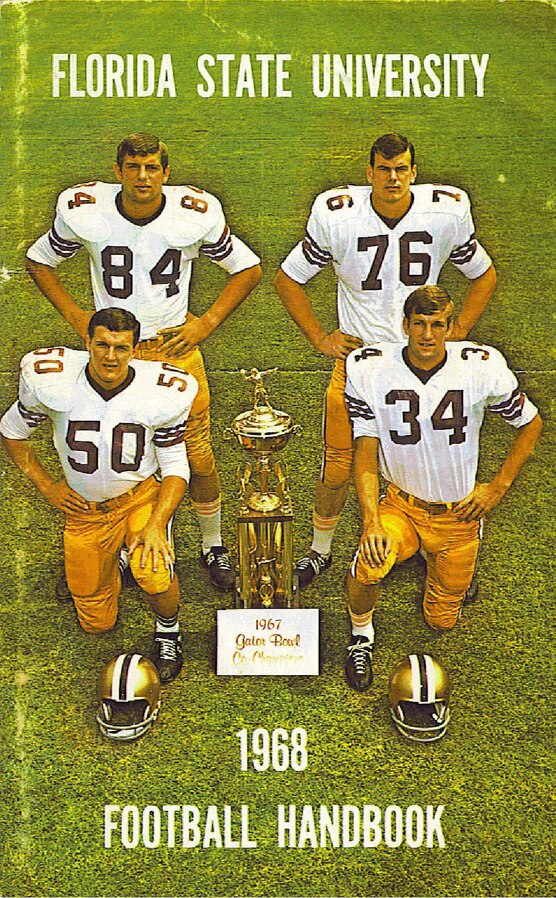
FSU players with the 1967 Gator Bowl trophy

The Seminoles are the ninth most successful bowl team in history and played in a record 36 consecutive bowl games from 1982 to 2017, although the NCAA doesn't recognize this because their 2006 Emerald Bowl win and appearance were both vacated as a result of the 2007 academic scandal. FSU is one of nine schools to have played in each major bowl game with a 14–13 record in those games.

Season	Date	Bowl	Opponent	Result
2011	December 29, 2011	Champs Sports Bowl	Notre Dame	W 18–14
2012	January 1, 2013	Orange Bowl	Northern Illinois	W 31–10
2013	January 6, 2014	BCS National Championship Game	Auburn	W 34–31
2014	January 1, 2015	Rose Bowl (College Football Playoff)	Oregon	L 20–59
2015	December 31, 2015	Peach Bowl	Houston	L 24–38
2016	December 30, 2016	Orange Bowl	Michigan	W 33–32
2017	December 27, 2017	Independence Bowl	Southern Mississippi	W 42–13
2019	December 31, 2019	Sun Bowl	Arizona State	L 14–20
2022	December 29, 2022	Cheez-It Bowl	Oklahoma	W 35–32
2023	December 30, 2023	Orange Bowl	Georgia	L 3–63

==== Playoffs ====
The Seminoles have made one appearance in the College Football Playoff.

Year	Seed	Opponent	Round	Result
2014	3	No. 2 Oregon	Semifinal – Rose Bowl	L 20–59

=== All-time record vs. current ACC teams ===
Opponent	Won	Lost	Tied	Pct.	Streak	First	Last
Boston College	17	6	0	.739	Won 1	1957	2026
California	1	0	0	1.000	Won 1	2024	2024
Clemson	21	18	0	.538	Lost 3	1970	2026
Duke	22	1	0	.957	Lost 1	1992	2024
Georgia Tech	15	12	1	.554	Lost 1	1903	2024
Louisville	18	7	0	.720	Lost 1	1952	2026
Miami	33	38	0	.465	Lost 3	1951	2026
North Carolina	17	4	1	.795	Lost 1	1983	2024
NC State	27	18	0	.600	Lost 5	1952	2026
Notre Dame^{*}	6	6	0	.500	Lost 4	1981	2024
Pittsburgh	6	7	0	.462	Won 1	1971	2026
SMU	0	2	0	.000	Lost 2	2024	2026
Stanford	0	1	0	.000	Lost 1	2025	2025
Syracuse	14	2	0	.875	Won 4	1966	2023
Virginia	16	5	0	.762	Won 1	1992	2026
Virginia Tech	25	13	1	.654	Won 2	1955	2025
Wake Forest	32	9	1	.774	Won 2	1956	2025
Totals	265	150	4	.637			

*Notre Dame is an associate member of the ACC with a scheduling agreement in football
*^{1}denotes one win vacated during the 2006 and 2007 seasons
*^{2}denotes two wins vacated during the 2006 and 2007 seasons

=== All-time record vs. non-conference opponents ===
School	Record	First	Last
Abilene Christian	1–2	1953	1957
Alabama	2^{1}–4–1	1965	2026
Alabama-Birmingham	2^{1}–0	2001	2007
Alabama State	1–0	2019	2019
Arizona State	3–2	1971	2019
Auburn	5–13–1	1954	2014
Baylor	1–2	1965	1974
Bethune-Cookman	1–0	2013	2013
Boise State	0–1	2019	2019
Brigham Young	4–0	1991	2010
Central Arkansas	1–0	2026	2026
Central Florida	1–0	1995	1995
Charleston Southern	3–0	2011	2024
Cincinnati	6–0	1977	1990
Citadel	6–0–1	1955	2014
Colorado	3^{1}–0	2003	2008
Colorado State	1–1	1972	1974
Cumberland	1–1	1947	1948
Delaware State	1–0	2017	2017
Delta State	1–0	1951	1951
Duquesne	1–0	2022	2022
East Carolina	7–0	1980	1990
East Texas A&M	1–0	2025	2025
Erskine	1–1	1948	1949
Florida	28–39–2	1958	2025
Furman	8–2	1952	1987
George Washington	1–0	1961	1961
Georgia	4–7–1	1954	2023
Georgia Southern	2–0	1988	1990
Houston	2–13–2	1960	2015
Idaho	1–0	2013	2013
Indiana	1–0	1986	1986
Iowa State	1–1	1975	2002
Jacksonville NAS	1–0	1951	1951
Jacksonville State	2–2	1947	2021
Kansas	5–2	1971	1993
Kansas State	3–0	1970	1977

School	Record	First	Last
Kent State	1–0	2025	2025
Kentucky	1–4–1	1960	2007
LSU	9–2	1968	2023
Louisiana-Lafayette	1–0	2022	2022
Louisiana-Monroe	3–0	2011	2019
Louisiana Tech	2–2	1952	1999
Maryland	21^{1}–2	1966	2013
Massachusetts	1–0	2021	2021
Memphis	10–8–1	1959	2024
Michigan	2–1	1986	2016
Michigan State	2–0	1987	1988
Middle Tennessee	1–0	1991	1991
Millsaps	2–0	1948	1949
Ole Miss	1–1	1961	2016
Mississippi College	3–0	1948	1950
Mississippi State	7–2	1966	1979
Murray State	1–0	2012	2012
Navy	1–0	1978	1978
Nebraska	6–2	1980	1994
Nevada	1–0	2013	2013
New Mexico State	2–0	1964	2026
Newberry	1–0	1950	1950
North Alabama	1–0	2023	2023
North Texas	2–0	1976	1977
Northern Illinois	2–0	2013	2018
Ohio	1–0	1956	1956
Ohio State	3–0	1981	1998
Oklahoma	2–6	1965	2022
Oklahoma State	4–1	1958	2014
Oregon	0–1	2015	2015
Penn State	1–1–1	1967	2006
Randolph-Macon	1–0	1950	1950
Rice	0^{1}–0	2006	2006
Richmond	3–0	1959	1961
Samford	3–0	1950	2018
San Diego State	0–2	1973	1977

School	Record	First	Last
Savannah State	1–0	2012	2012
Sewanee	2–0	1949	1950
South Carolina	16–3	1966	2010
South Florida	3–1	2009	2016
Southern California	2–0	1997	1998
Southern Illinois	1–0	1982	1982
Southern Mississippi	15–8–1	1952	2023
Stetson	6–1–1	1947	1954
Sul Ross	1–0	1951	1951
Tampa	9–2	1948	1959
Temple	1–0	1984	1984
Tennessee	1–1	1958	1999
Tennessee-Chattanooga	3–0	1984	2015
Tennessee Tech	1–1	1947	1958
Texas A&M	4–0	1967	1998
Texas Christian	1–2	1963	1965
Texas State	1–0	2015	2015
Texas-El Paso	0–1	1955	1955
Texas Tech	4–1	1966	1987
Toledo	1–0	1986	1986
Troy	5–1	1947	2006
Tulane	10^{3}–0	1983	1992
Tulsa	5–0	1969	1985
UCLA	0^{1}–0	2006	2006
Utah State	1–0	1975	1975
Villanova	3–1	1954	1957
Virginia Military Institute	2–1	1952	1954
West Alabama	1–1	1948	1949
West Virginia	3–0	1982	2010
Western Michigan	1^{1}–0	1991	2006
Whiting Field NAS	1–0	1949	1949
Wichita State	2–0	1969	1986
William & Mary	1–1	1959	1950
Wisconsin	1–0	2008	2008
Wofford	3–0	1950	1952
Wyoming	0–1	1966	1966

*^{1}Denotes win vacated during the 2006 and 2007 seasons
*^{3}Denotes win via forfeit

=== All-time record vs. rivals ===
Opponent	Won	Lost	Tied	Pct.	Streak	First	Last
Florida	28	39	2	.420	Lost 2	1958	2025
Miami	33	38	0	.465	Lost 3	1951	2026
Clemson	21	18	0	.538	Lost 3	1970	2026
Virginia	16	5	0	.762	Won 1	1992	2026
Totals	98	100	2	.495			

=== Polls ===
Florida State has ended their football season ranked 40 times in either the AP or Coaches Poll.
Top-10 finishes are colored ██

Year	Record	AP Poll†	Coaches‡
1964	9–1–1		11
1967	7–2–2		15
1968	8–3–0		14
1971	8–4–0		19
1977	10–2–0	14	11
1979	11–1–0	6	8
1980	10–2–0	5	5
1982	9–3–0	13	10
1984	7–3–2	17	19
1985	9–3–0	15	13
1986	7–4–1		20
1987	11–1–0	2	2
1988	11–1–0	3	3
1989	10–2–0	3	2
1990	10–2–0	4	4

Year	Record	AP Poll†	Coaches‡
1991	11–2–0	4	4
1992	11–1–0	2	2
1993	12–1–0	1	1
1994	10–1–1	4	5
1995	10–2–0	4	5
1996	11–1	3	3
1997	11–1	3	3
1998	11–2	3	3
1999	12–0	1	1
2000	11–2	5	4
2001	8–4	15	15
2002	9–5	21	23
2003	10–3	11	10
2004	9–3	15	14
2005	8–5	23	23

Year	Record	AP Poll†	Coaches‡
2008	9–4	21	23
2010	10–4	17	16
2011	9–4	23	23
2012	12–2	10	8
2013	14–0	1	1
2014	13–1	5	6
2015	10–3	14	14
2016	10–3	8	8
2022	10–3	11	10
2023	13–1	6	6

† AP Poll began selecting the nation's Top 20 teams in 1936. Only the Top 10 teams were recognized from 1962 to 1967. The AP Poll expanded back to the Top 20 teams in 1968. In 1989, it began recognizing the Top 25 teams.
‡ UPI/Coaches Poll began selecting its Top 20 teams on a weekly basis in 1950 before expanding to the nations's Top 25 teams in 1990.

=== Notable games ===
- 1950 – First Game at Doak – Florida State played the first game at Doak Campbell Stadium, a 40–7 win over Randolph-Macon College.
- 1964 – FSU's First Win Over UF – Florida State had never beaten Florida, gaining only a 3–3 tie in six tries, all at Gainesville. Since 1947, when Florida State College for Women became Florida State University, its athletes have endured "girl school" taunts. During the week Florida players wore stickers on their helmets in practice reading "Never, FSU, Never." The thrust may have added considerable fuel to FSU's already blazing fire. FSU's aggressive defense helped force five Florida fumbles, and the Seminoles claimed four of them. The Tribe intercepted two passes. FSU lost two fumbles and had one pass intercepted. Steve Tensi connected on 11 of 22 throws for 190 yards. Fred Biletnikoff, a decoy much of the way and well covered by Florida, caught only two, for 78 yards and a touchdown. The 16–7 win ended six years of FSU frustration against the Gators and left Florida with a 5–3 record. FSU ended its regular season with an 8–1–1 chart, a showing exceeded only by an unbeaten 1950 season.
- 1988 – Puntrooskie – Florida State had a 4th down and 4 to go at its own 21-yard line with about a minute and a half to go in the 4th quarter at Clemson. They lined up to punt but the ball was snapped to an up back who handed it to Leroy Butler who ran down the left side of the field all the way to the Clemson 4-yard line. Florida State wound up kicking a field goal to win the game, 24–21.
- 1991 – Big Win at the Big House – In their first trip ever to Michigan Stadium, Florida State would beat the No. 3 Michigan Wolverines 51–31 behind quarterback Casey Weldon's 268 yards and 2 touchdowns and Amp Lee's 122 yards rushing. One of the most memorable plays in Florida State history occurred on Michigan's 1st play in the 1st quarter when cornerback Terrell Buckley returned an Elvis Grbac interception for a 40-yard touchdown.
- 1993 – Ward to Dunn – The Seminoles came into The Swamp ranked No. 1 and looking to play for the national championship. Florida had clinched the SEC East championship and were themselves ranked in the top five. Early on it looked to be a Florida State rout, as the Seminoles took a 27–7 lead into the fourth quarter. However, Florida scored two quick touchdowns to make the score 27–21. With six minutes remaining, the Seminoles faced third down at their own 21-yard-line. In what many people consider the greatest play in Florida State history, Heisman Trophy winning quarterback Charlie Ward hit freshman Warrick Dunn up the sideline for a 79-yard game-clinching touchdown run and a 33–21 FSU win.
- 1994 – FSU Wins First National Championship – This 60th edition of the Orange Bowl featured the Nebraska Cornhuskers and the Florida State Seminoles. Florida State came into the game 11–1, and ranked first in the nation. Nebraska came into the game undefeated at 11–0, and with a number 2 ranking. Late in 4th quarter, FSU's Heisman trophy winning quarterback Charlie Ward drove the Seminoles all the way to the Nebraska 3-yard line. The Huskers held and forced Scott Bentley to kick his fourth field goal of the night, which was good, and FSU led 18–16 with just 21 seconds remaining. Florida State players and coaches went wild on the sidelines, and were penalized for excessive celebration, costing them 15 yards on the ensuing kickoff. As a result, the Huskers were able to get a decent return and began their final possession at their own 43-yard line. As time ran down, Tommy Frazier hit tight end Trumane Bell for a 29-yard gain to the FSU 28-yard line. The clock ticked down to 0:00, setting off more chaos on the FSU sideline, complete with the compulsory Gatorade bath given to FSU coach Bobby Bowden. However, referee John Soffey ruled that Bell was down with 1 second left on the clock, and ordered the field cleared, allowing Nebraska placekicker Byron Bennett an opportunity to kick the game-winning field goal. But the 45-yard kick sailed wide left, preserving the 18–16 win for the Seminoles.
- 1994 – The Choke at Doak – In the greatest fourth-quarter comeback of the series, the Gators led the Seminoles 31–3 after three quarters. However, the Seminoles scored 28 points in the final 15 minutes to tie the game at 31–31.
- 1995 – The Fifth Quarter in the French Quarter – After the Choke at Doak game ended in a 31–31 tie both teams where selected to the 1995 Sugar Bowl. The game would become known as "The Fifth Quarter in the French Quarter." With 1:32 left in the game All-America linebacker Derrick Brooks intercepted a pass from Danny Wuerffel to seal FSU's victory 23–17.
- 1996 – No. 1 vs No. 2 – The No. 1–ranked and undefeated Gators came into Tallahassee favored against the second-ranked Seminoles. The 'Noles got off to a quick start when Peter Boulware blocked the Gator's first punt of the game, resulting in a touchdown. Florida's eventual Heisman Trophy winner quarterback Danny Wuerffel threw three interceptions in the first half, and FSU had a 17–0 lead after one quarter of play. Wuerffel got on track after that, throwing for three touchdowns. The last one (to WR Reidel Anthony) cut the Florida State lead to three points with just over a minute left to play. The ensuing onside kick went out of bounds, however, and the Seminoles held on for the 24–21 upset win.
- 1997 – Top Five Matchup in Chapel Hill – In the first ACC game between two teams ranked in the top five, Florida State dominated North Carolina 20–3, the Tar Heels' only defeat on the season.
- 2000 – FSU Wins Second National Championship – Florida State scored first and took advantage of a blocked punt for a touchdown, giving the Seminoles a 14–0 lead in the first quarter. Virginia Tech, led by QB Michael Vick, answered with a touchdown drive of its own before the end of the quarter, but Florida State scored two quick touchdowns to begin the second quarter. Virginia Tech scored a touchdown before halftime, but halfway through the game, Florida State held a 28–14 lead. In the third quarter, Virginia Tech's offense gave the Hokies a lead with a field goal and two touchdowns. Tech failed to convert two two-point conversions, but held a 29–28 lead at the end of the third quarter. Florida State answered in the fourth quarter, however, taking a 36–29 lead with a touchdown and successful two-point conversion early in the quarter. From this point, the Seminoles did not relinquish the lead, extending it to 46–29 with a field goal and another touchdown. With the win, Florida State clinched the 1999 BCS national championship, the team's second national championship in its history.
- 2005 – The Miami Muff – In 2005, the Florida State Seminoles finally gained some redemption for the past Wide Right heartbreaks. Miami kicker John Peattie missed two field goals in the 1st quarter, while FSU kicker Gary Cismesia was 1/2 for the game. Trailing 10–7 in the 4th, the Hurricanes drove down the field to set up a game-tying field goal with 2:16 left. When the ball was snapped, it was mishandled by holder Brian Monroe and the ball never reached the kicker's foot. Florida State took over on downs and ran out the clock to end Miami's six-game winning streak in the rivalry.
- 2005 – FSU Wins Inaugural ACC Championship Game – The Seminoles defeated Virginia Tech in the first ACC Championship Game.
- 2010 – The Golden Toe – In the first-ever walk-off, game-winning kick in school history, Dustin Hopkins booted a 55-yard field goal as time expired to lift the Seminoles to a 16–13 victory over Clemson.
- 2013 – Top Five Matchup in Death Valley – In the second ACC game between two teams ranked in the top five, Florida State handed Clemson their worst home loss in school history.
- 2014 – FSU Wins Third National Championship – After Florida State scored a field goal on their first drive, Auburn responded with a touchdown in the first quarter and two in the second to storm out to a 21–3 lead. After a successful punt fake, the Seminoles managed a late touchdown before halftime to go into the locker room down, 21–10. Both teams dominated on defense in the third quarter with the Seminoles hitting a field goal to cut the lead to 8. In the fourth quarter, Florida State scored a touchdown early to make it a one-point game. After Auburn made a field goal, Levonte Whitfield returned the following kickoff 100 yards to give the Seminoles the lead, 27–24. Auburn answered with a touchdown to go up 31–27 with 1:19 remaining. On their final drive of 7 plays, Florida State scored a touchdown with 13 seconds remaining, benefiting from a pass interference by Auburn's Chris Davis Jr. on a crucial 3rd and 8. The Seminoles emerged victorious 34–31 to end the SEC's streak of 7 consecutive BCS titles.
- 2016 – The Block at The Rock – Late in the fourth quarter against rival Miami, Florida State had a touchdown lead. Miami scored on an 11-yard reception by Stacey Coley with 1:38 left in the game to make the score 20–19 with an extra point attempt coming. Defensive end DeMarcus Walker blocked the extra point to give Florida State a one-point win.
- 2021 – 4th and 14 – The Seminoles came out hot, scoring 14 points and forcing three turnovers in the first quarter before taking a 20–7 lead into halftime. Miami would storm back with 21 unanswered points, taking a 28–20 lead with 11 minutes left. After a lengthy drive that resulted in a field goal by the Seminoles and an excellent defensive stop led by defensive end Jermaine Johnson II, the Seminoles had the ball with 2:09 left in the game down 28–23. After a 59-yard bomb caught by wide receiver Ja’Khi Douglas, the Florida State offense sputtered out to a 4th and 14 at the Miami 25 yard line. Florida State quarterback Jordan Travis would convert on a pass to wide receiver Andrew Parchment to the Miami 1 yard line before Travis would run it in himself on both a touchdown and the 2-point conversion to make it 31–28 with 26 seconds left. Miami's push to tie the game was stopped short when refs ruled the game over after an attempted spike by Miami QB Tyler Van Dyke with less than three seconds left, the minimum time needed according to NCAA rules.

== Individual accomplishments ==
=== Individual national award winners ===
Players

Heisman Trophy Best Player	Maxwell Award Best Player	Walter Camp Award Best Player	Chic Harley Award Best Player	Archie Griffin Award Most Valuable Player	AP Player of the Year
1993 – Charlie Ward, QB; 2000 – Chris Weinke, QB; 2013 – Jameis Winston, QB	1993 – Charlie Ward, QB	1993 – Charlie Ward,QB; 2013 – Jameis Winston, QB	1993 – Charlie Ward, QB	2013 – Jameis Winston, QB	2013 – Jameis Winston, QB

Davey O'Brien Award Best Quarterback	Manning Award Best Quarterback	Kellen Moore Award Best Quarterback	Johhny Unitas Award Best Senior Quarterback	Sammy Baugh Trophy Best Passer	Jim Brown Award Best Runningback	Paul Warfield Award Best Wide Receiver	John Mackey Award Best Tight End	Dave Remington Trophy Best Center
1993 – Charlie Ward; 2000 – Chris Weinke; 2013 – Jameis Winston	2013 – Jameis Winston	1991 – Casey Weldon; 1993 – Charlie Ward	1991 – Casey Weldon; 1993 – Charlie Ward; 2000 – Chris Weinke	2000 – Chris Weinke	2015 – Dalvin Cook	1999 – Peter Warrick	2014 – Nick O'Leary	2013 – Bryan Stork

Jim Thorpe Award Best Defensive Back	Jack Tatum Trophy Best Defensive Back	Lombardi Award Best Lineman/Best Linebacker	Bill Willis Trophy Best Defensive Lineman	Butkus Award Best Linebacker	Jack Lambert Trophy Best Linebacker
1988 – Deion Sanders; 1991 – Terrell Buckley	1991 – Terrell Buckley; 2016 – Tarvarus McFadden	1992 – Marvin Jones; 2000 – Jamal Reynolds	1997 – Andre Wadsworth; 2000 – Jamal Reynolds	1987 – Paul McGowan; 1992 – Marvin Jones	1992 – Marvin Jones; 1994 – Derrick Brooks

Lou Groza Award Best Kicker	Vlade Award Most Accurate Kicker
1998, 1999 – Sebastian Janikowski; 2008 – Graham Gano; 2013 – Roberto Aguayo	2013, 2014 – Roberto Aguayo

Bobby Bowden Award
Best Student Athlete
2010 – Christian Ponder

Wuerffel Trophy
Community Service, Athletic, and Academic Achievement
2022 – Dillan Gibbons

Coaches

Bobby Dodd Award Coach of the Year	Walter Camp Award Coach of the Year	Paul "Bear" Bryant Award Coach of the Year	Home Depot Award Coach of the Year
1980 – Bobby Bowden; 2023 – Mike Norvell	1991 – Bobby Bowden	2023 – Mike Norvell	1994 – Bobby Bowden

Broyles Award
Best Assistant Coach
1996 – Mickey Andrews, DC

Paul "Bear" Bryant 'Lifetime Achievement' Award Lifetime Achievement	Bobby Bowden Award Lifetime Achievement
2010 – Bobby Bowden	2011 – Bobby Bowden

=== Individual conference awards ===
Players

ACC Player of the Year	ACC Offensive Player of the Year	ACC Defensive Player of the Year	ACC Rookie of the Year	ACC Offensive Rookie of the Year	ACC Defensive Rookie of the Year
1992, 1993 – Charlie Ward; 1995 – Danny Kanell; 1997 – Andre Wadsworth; 2000 – Chris Weinke; 2013 – Jameis Winston; 2023 – Jordan Travis	1993 – Charlie Ward; 1995 – Danny Kanell; 1997 – Thad Busby; 2000 – Chris Weinke; 2013 – Jameis Winston; 2023 – Jordan Travis	1993 – Derrick Brooks; 1994 – Derrick Alexander; 1996 – Peter Boulware; 1997 – Andre Wadsworth; 2003 – Darnell Dockett; 2012 – Björn Werner; 2016 – DeMarcus Walker; 2021 – Jermaine Johnson II	1992 – Tamarick Vanover; 1997 – Travis Minor; 2001 – Chris Rix; 2013 – Jameis Winston; 2016 – Deondre Francois	2013 – Jameis Winston; 2016 – Deondre Francois	2006 – Myron Rolle; 2010 – Xavier Rhodes; 2012 – Ronald Darby; 2022 – Patrick Payton

Jacobs Blocking Trophy	Brian Piccolo Award	Jim Tatum Award
1994, 1995 – Clay Shiver; 1997 – Tra Thomas; 2000 – Tarlos Thomas; 2001, 2002 – Brett Williams; 2008, 2009 – Rodney Hudson; 2013, 2014 – Cameron Erving; 2015, 2016 – Roderick Johnson	1992 – Dan Footman; 1997 – Sam Cowart; 1998 – Corey Simon; 1999 – Chris Weinke; 2002 – Anquan Boldin; 2012 – Chris Thompson; 2021 – McKenzie Milton	2022 – Dillan Gibbons

Coaches

ACC Coach of the Year
1993, 1997 – Bobby Bowden
2023 – Mike Norvell

=== Heisman Trophy ===
Three Florida State players have been awarded the Heisman Trophy. Charlie Ward received the award in 1993, Chris Weinke in 2000 and Jameis Winston in 2013. Casey Weldon finished as runner-up in 1991.

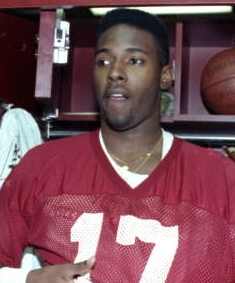
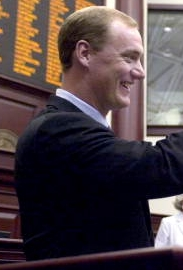
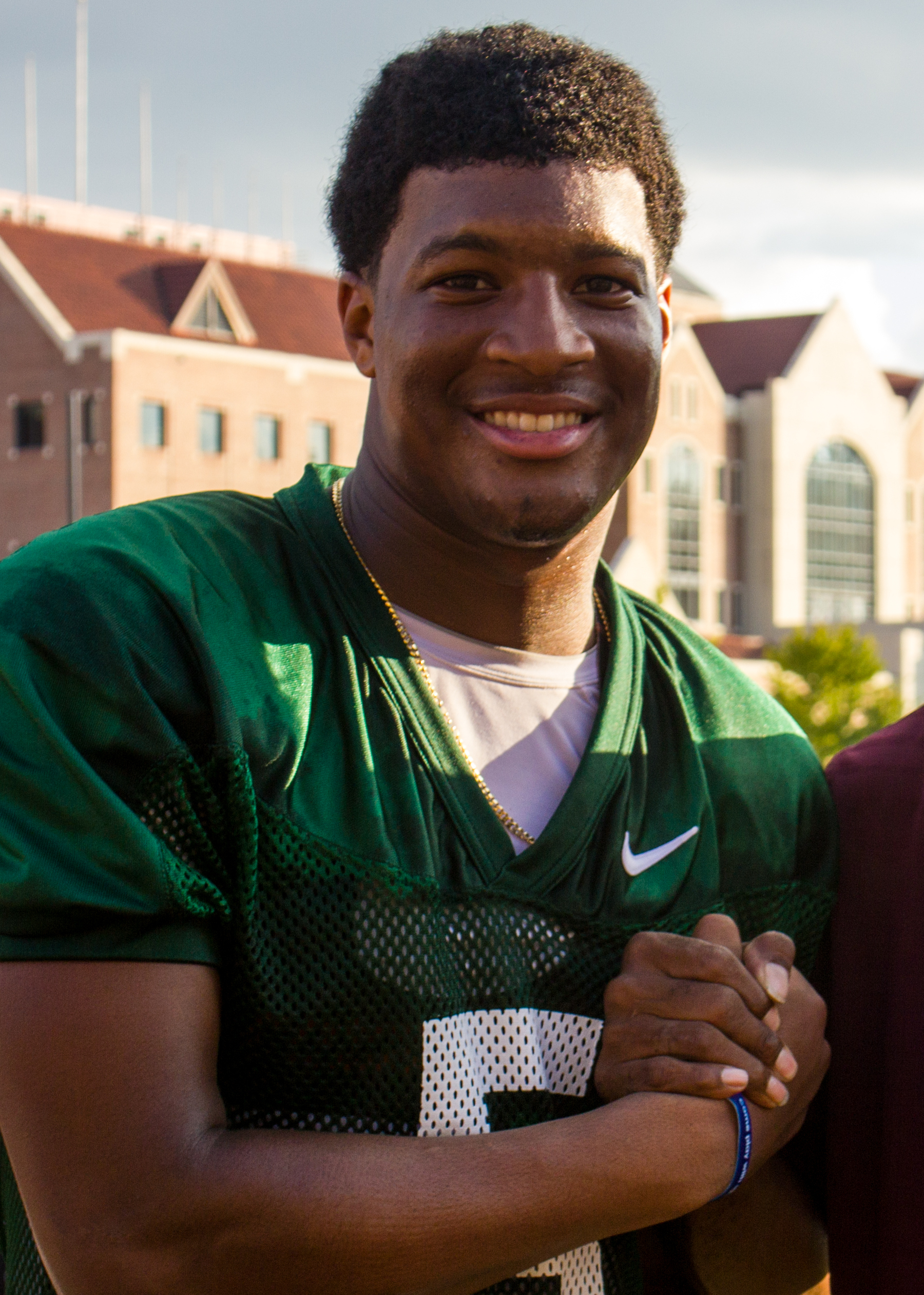
FSU's Heisman Trophy winners

Year	Name	Position	Place	Ref.
1967	Kim Hammond	QB	5th	
1972	Gary Huff	QB	10th	
1979	Ron Simmons	DT	9th	
1984	Greg Allen	RB	7th	
1988	Deion Sanders	DB	8th	
1991	Casey Weldon	QB	2nd	
1992	Marvin Jones; Charlie Ward	LB; QB	4th 6th	
1993	Charlie Ward	QB	1st	
1995	Warrick Dunn	RB	9th	
1996	Warrick Dunn	RB	5th	
1999	Peter Warrick	WR	6th	
2000	Chris Weinke	QB	1st	
2013	Jameis Winston	QB	1st	
2014	Jameis Winston	QB	6th	
2015	Dalvin Cook	RB	7th	
2016	Dalvin Cook	RB	T-10th	
2023	Jordan Travis	QB	5th	

=== Consensus All-Americans ===
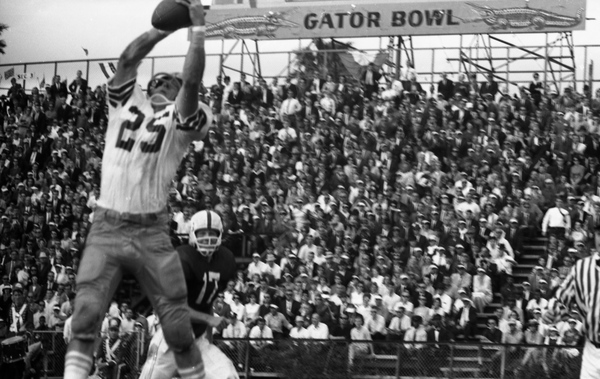
The Biletnikoff Award is named in honor of FSU All-American wide receiver Fred Biletnikoff.

225 Florida State players have been honored as All-American players with 39 being awarded as consensus All-Americans. Seven Florida State players have been two-time consensus All-Americans.

Year(s)	Name	Number	Position
1964	Fred Biletnikoff	25	WR
1967–1968	Ron Sellers	34	WR
1979–1980	Ron Simmons	51	DL
1983	Greg Allen	26	RB
1985	Jamie Dukes	64	OL
1987–1988	Deion Sanders	2	CB
1989	LeRoy Butler	6	CB
1991–1992	Marvin Jones	55	LB
1991	Terrell Buckley	27	CB
1993	Charlie Ward	17	QB
1993–1994	Derrick Brooks	10	LB
1993	Corey Sawyer	8	CB
1994	Clifton Abraham	2	CB
1995	Clay Shiver	53	C
1996	Peter Boulware	58	DE
1996	Reinard Wilson	55	DE
1997	Sam Cowart	1	LB
1997	Andre Wadsworth	85	DE
1998–1999	Sebastian Janikowski	38	K
1998–1999	Peter Warrick	9	WR
1999	Corey Simon	53	DL
1999	Jason Whitaker	68	OL
2000	Tay Cody	27	CB
2000	Snoop Minnis	13	WR
2000	Jamal Reynolds	58	DE
2003–2004	Alex Barron	70	OL
2010	Rodney Hudson	62	OL
2011	Shawn Powell	45	P
2012	Björn Werner	95	DL
2013	Lamarcus Joyner	20	S
2013	Bryan Stork	52	C
2013	Jameis Winston	5	QB
2014	Roberto Aguayo	19	K
2014	Tre' Jackson	54	OL
2014	Nick O'Leary	35	TE
2015	Jalen Ramsey	8	CB
2016	Dalvin Cook	4	RB
2016	DeMarcus Walker	44	DE
2024	Alex Mastromanno	29	P

=== Unanimous All-Americans ===
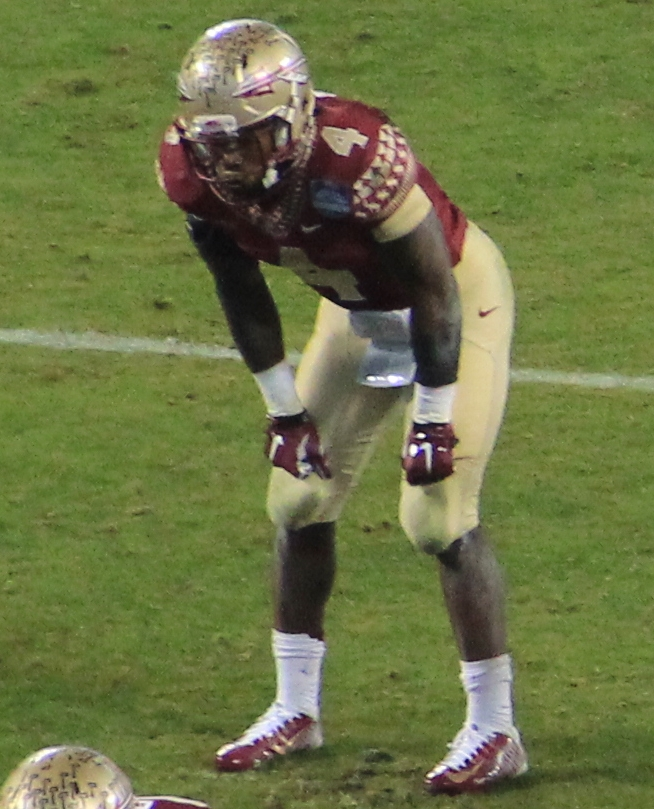
Running back Dalvin Cook is one of fifteen Seminoles to have been named unanimous All-American players.

15 Florida State players have been selected as unanimous All-Americans. Deion Sanders is the only Seminole to have been honored as a two-time unanimous selection.

Year(s)	Name	Number	Position
1987–1988	Deion Sanders	2	CB
1991	Terrell Buckley	27	CB
1992	Marvin Jones	55	LB
1993	Charlie Ward	17	QB
1993	Derrick Brooks	10	LB
1999	Sebastian Janikowski	38	K
1999	Peter Warrick	9	WR
2000	Jamal Reynolds	58	DE
2004	Alex Barron	70	OL
2010	Rodney Hudson	62	OL
2012	Björn Werner	95	DL
2013	Lamarcus Joyner	20	S
2014	Tre' Jackson	54	OL
2016	Dalvin Cook	4	RB

=== Honored jersey numbers ===
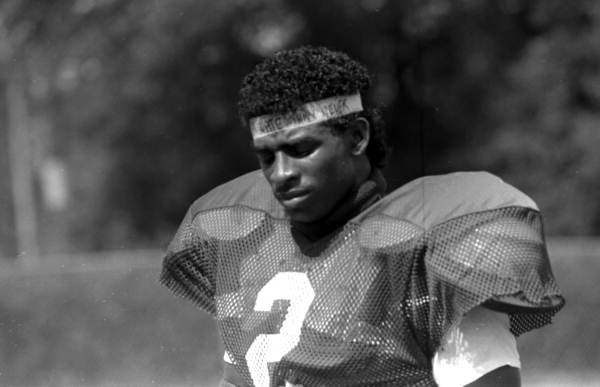
Deion Sanders is one of twelve Seminoles whose numbers have been honored by the school.

Florida State Seminoles honored jersey numbers
No.	Player	Pos.	Tenure	Ref.
2	Deion Sanders	CB	1985–1988	
5	Jameis Winston	QB	2012–2014	
9	Peter Warrick	WR	1995–1999	
10	Derrick Brooks	LB	1991–1994	
16	Chris Weinke	QB	1997–2000	
17	Charlie Ward	QB	1989–1993	
25	Fred Biletnikoff	WR	1962–1964	
27	Terrell Buckley	CB	1989–1991	
28	Warrick Dunn	RB	1993–1996	
34	Ron Sellers	WR	1966–1968	
38	Sebastian Janikowski	PK	1997–1999	
50	Ron Simmons	DT	1977–1980	
55	Marvin Jones	LB	1990–1992	

=== Hall of Fame inductees ===
==== College Football Hall of Fame ====
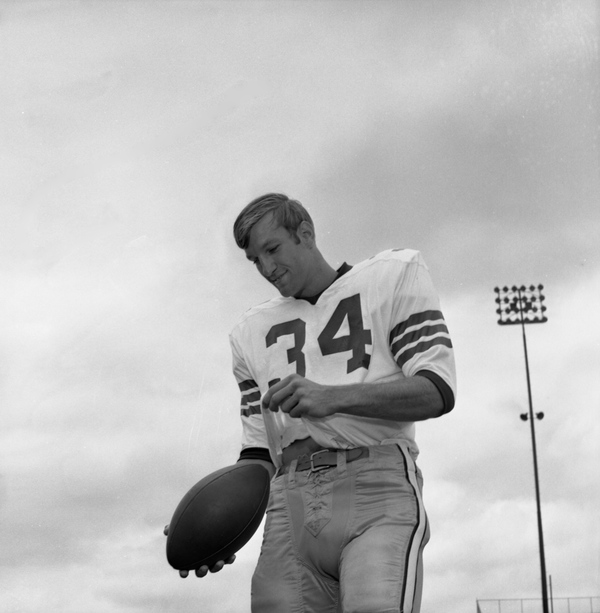
Ron Sellers was the first Seminole player to be inducted into the hall of fame.

Ten FSU players and two coaches have been inducted into the College Football Hall of Fame. In addition, one former player, Mack Brown, has been inducted into the Hall as a coach.

Name	Position	Career	Inducted	Ref.
Ron Sellers	WR	1966–1968	1988	
Fred Biletnikoff	WR	1962–1964	1991	
Darrell Mudra	Coach	1974–1975	2000	
Bobby Bowden	Coach	1976–2009	2006	
Charlie Ward	QB	1989, 1991–1993	2006	
Ron Simmons	DT	1977–1980	2009	
Deion Sanders	CB	1985–1988	2011	
Derrick Brooks	LB	1992–1994	2016	
Terrell Buckley	CB	1989–1991	2019	
Marvin Jones	LB	1990–1992	2022	
Warrick Dunn	RB	1993–1996	2024	
Peter Warrick	WR	1995–1999	2026	

==== Pro Football Hall of Fame ====
Five former Seminoles have been inducted into the Pro Football Hall of Fame.

Name	Position	Career	Inducted
Fred Biletnikoff	WR	1965–1978	1988
Deion Sanders	CB	1989–2000, 2004–2005	2011
Derrick Brooks	LB	1995–2008	2014
Walter Jones	OL	1997–2008	2014
LeRoy Butler	S	1990–2001	2022

==== Canadian Football Hall of Fame ====
One former Seminole has been inducted into the Canadian Football Hall of Fame.

Name	Position	Career	Inducted
Danny McManus	QB	1984–2007	2011

== Rivalries ==
The Seminoles' archrivals are Florida, whom they meet annually in the last game of the regular season, and Miami; both games are considered among the greatest rivalries in college football. A rivalry with Clemson has developed and grown due to both teams competing yearly for the Atlantic division.

=== Florida ===
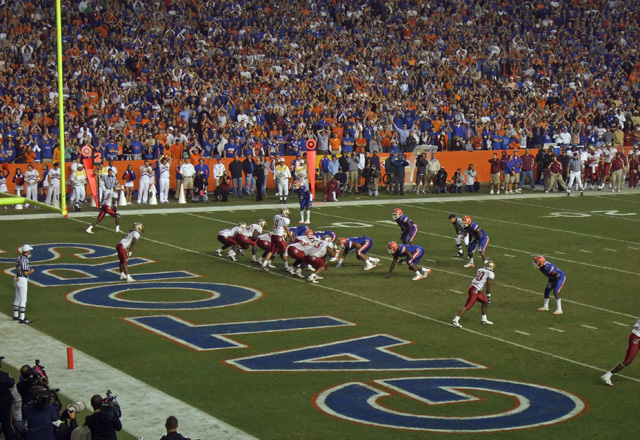
Florida State and Florida have played each year since 1958.

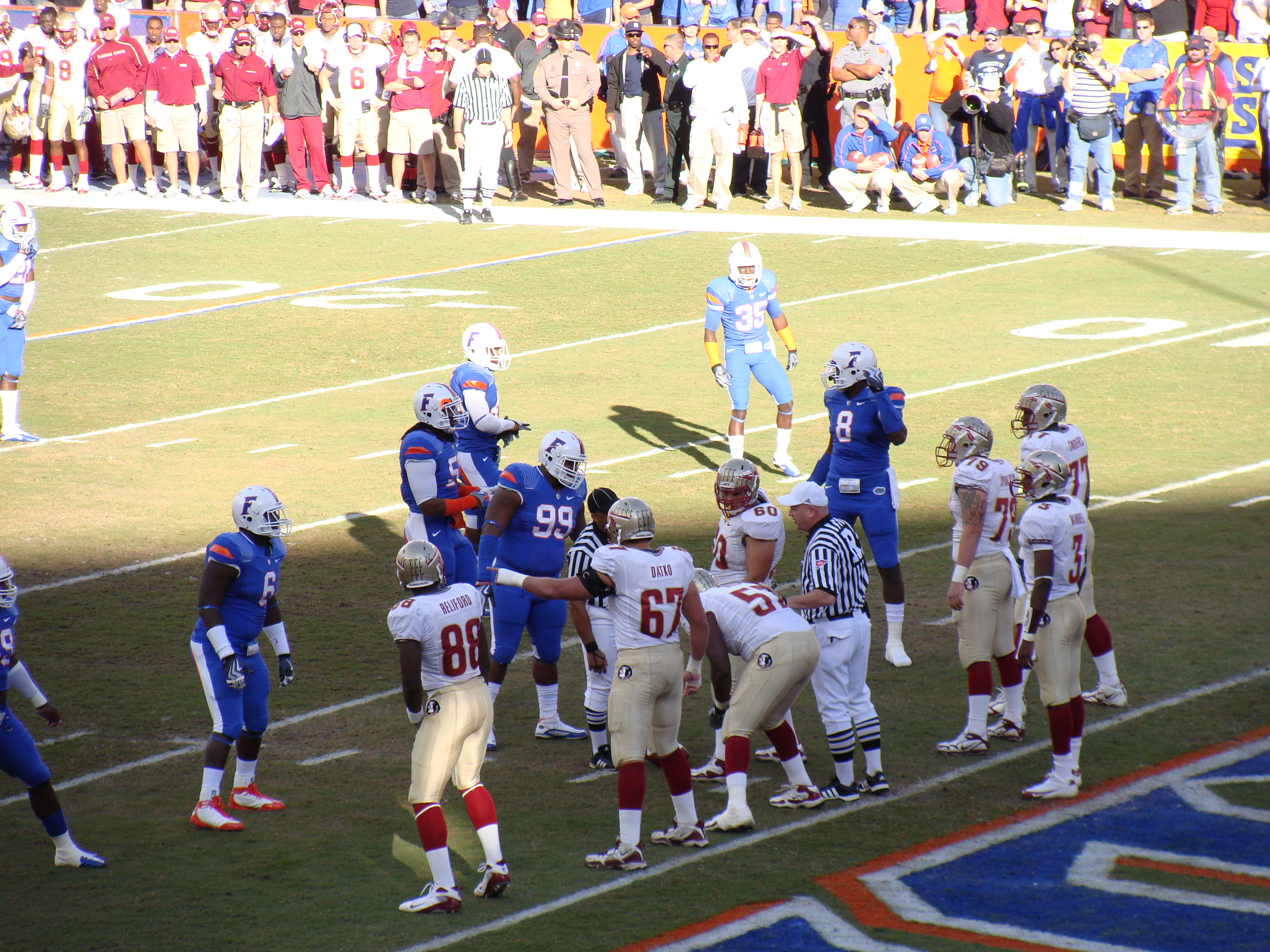
The Seminoles and Gators have met as ranked opponents on twenty-four occasions.

The Florida Gators are the main rival of the Florida State Seminoles. Florida State and Florida have played each other 69 times, with the Gators holding a 39–28–2 advantage. After the arrival of Bobby Bowden in 1976, the Seminoles have compiled a record of 26–24–1. The game alternates between Florida's home stadium, Steve Spurrier-Florida Field at Ben Hill Griffin Stadium in Gainesville, Florida and Florida State's home stadium, Doak Campbell Stadium in Tallahassee, Florida. The Makala Trophy is awarded to the winner of the Florida–Florida State game at the winning team's spring scrimmage.

=== Miami ===
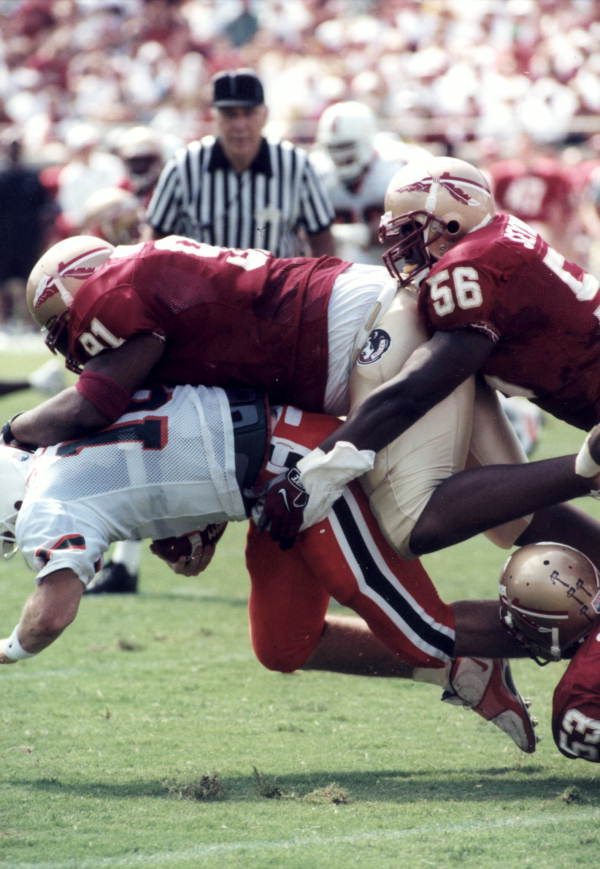
Florida State and Miami first met in 1951 and have played each year since 1966.

The rivalry dates to 1951, when the Miami Hurricanes defeated the Seminoles 35–13 in their inaugural meeting. The schools have played uninterrupted since 1966, with Miami leading the series 38–33.

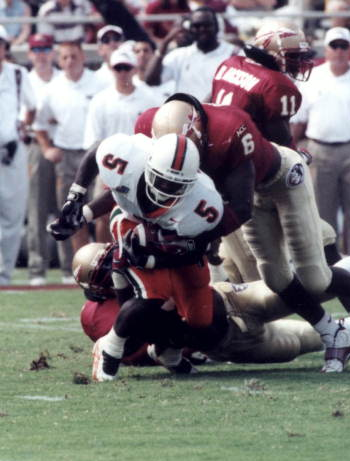
The Seminoles and Hurricanes have met as ranked opponents on twenty-seven occasions.

During the 1980s and 90s, the series emerged as one of the premier rivalries in college football. Between 1983 and 2013, the Hurricanes and Seminoles combined to win 8 national championships (5 for Miami, 3 for Florida State) and played in 15 national championship games (1983, 85, 86, 87, 89, 91, 92, 93, 96, 98, 99, 2000, 01, 02, 13). The rivalry has been popular not only because of its profound national championship implications and the competitiveness of the games but also because of the immense NFL-caliber talent typically present on the field when the two teams meet. The famous 1987 matchup featured over 50 future NFL players on both rosters combined.

The rivalry is a television ratings bonanza, accounting for several of the highest rated college football telecasts in ESPN history.

Florida Cup

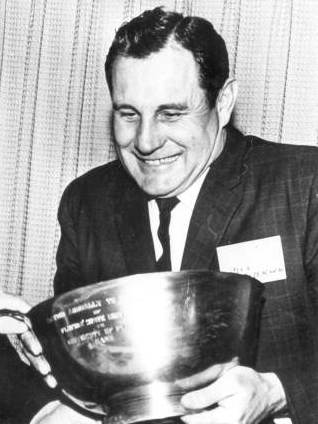
Bill Peterson coached the Seminoles to their first win over the Gators in the rivalry.

The Florida Cup is the trophy sponsored by the state of Florida given to either the Florida State University Seminoles, the University of Florida Gators, or the University of Miami Hurricanes for winning a round-robin against the other two teams in the same season (including bowl games if necessary).

It was created in 2002 by the Florida Sports Foundation, the official sports promotion and development organization of the state of Florida, and the Florida Championships Awards, Inc. The idea of finally having a trophy for the round robin winner between the three schools was enthusiastically endorsed by then governor Jeb Bush. Along with the Commander-in-Chief's Trophy (given to the winner of the round robin between Army, Navy and Air Force), the Florida Cup is one of the very few three way rivalries that presents a trophy to the winner.

The Florida Cup was awarded to the Florida State Seminoles in 2013, as Florida and Miami alsi played in the regular season.

=== Clemson ===
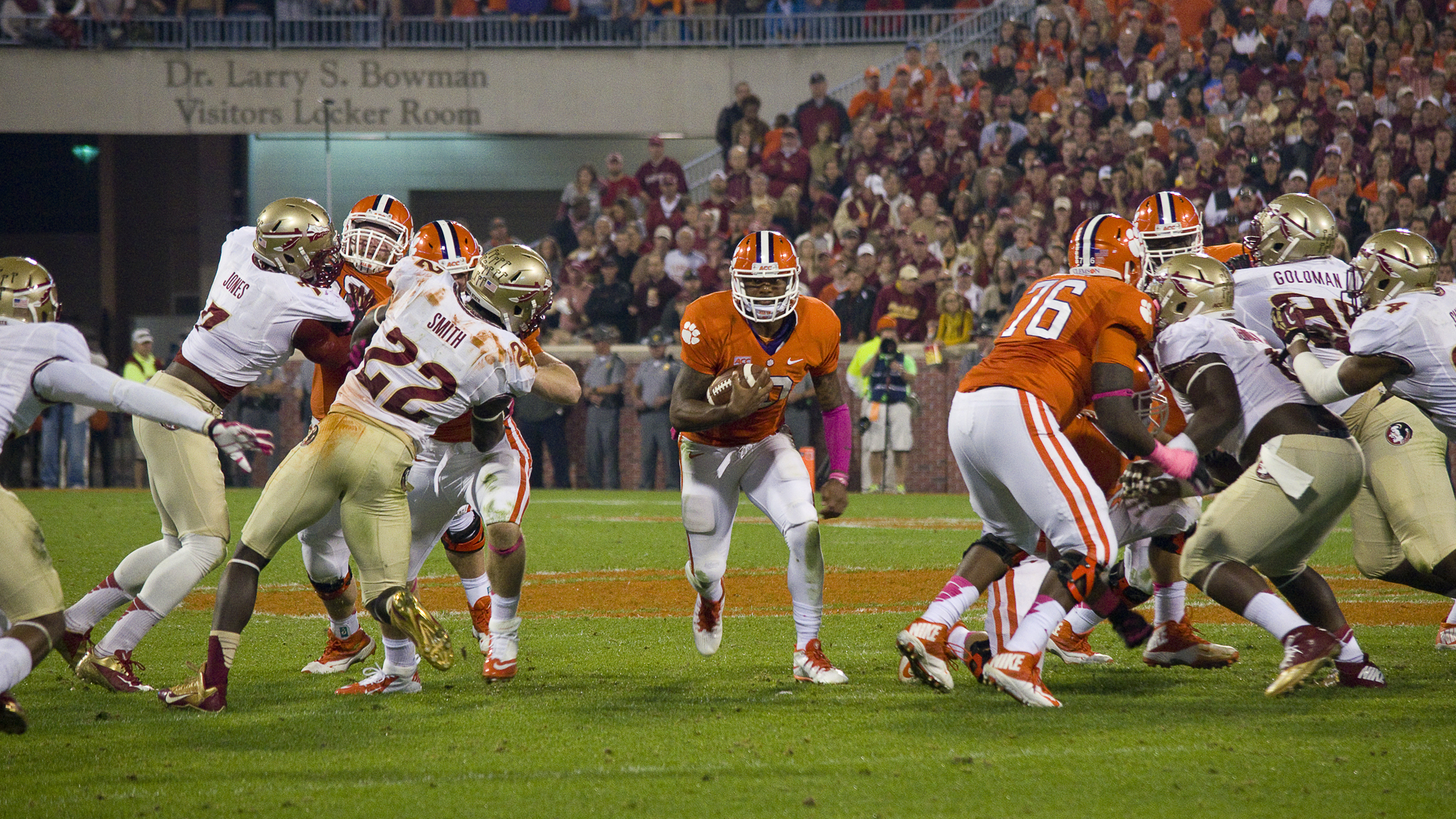
The Noles and Tigers competed for the Atlantic division title.

Florida State has a rivalry with conference foe, the Clemson Tigers. Florida State leads the all-time series 21–18. The Seminoles dominated the contests through most of the 1990s but 1999 marked a milestone as the hire of Bobby Bowden's son Tommy led to the first meeting, in 1999, which was the first time in Division I-A history that a father and a son met as opposing head coaches in a football game. During the time Tommy coached at Clemson, the game was known as the "Bowden Bowl"; Bobby won the series in the 9 years it was played before Tommy's resignation, taking 5 of those games with all four losses within the last five seasons.

One sticking point in the rivalry remains that a Clemson Tiger program that was strong in the 1980s had won 6 of the past 11 ACC titles from 1981 to 1991. 1991 would be the last ACC Championship the Tigers would win until 2011 as Florida State entered the ACC in 1992 and proceeded to win the next 9 ACC Championships in a row, and 12 of the next 14 in the series.

=== Virginia ===
The Seminoles also have a rivalry with the Virginia Cavaliers. Florida State and Virginia compete for the Jefferson–Eppes Trophy. The two schools have played for the trophy since its creation in 1995. It has been awarded a total of 21 times, with FSU receiving it 15 times, having vacated its 2006 win. The Seminoles hold the all-time advantage, 16–5. Because of conference expansion, the teams no longer play annually; the teams last met in 2026.

== Traditions ==
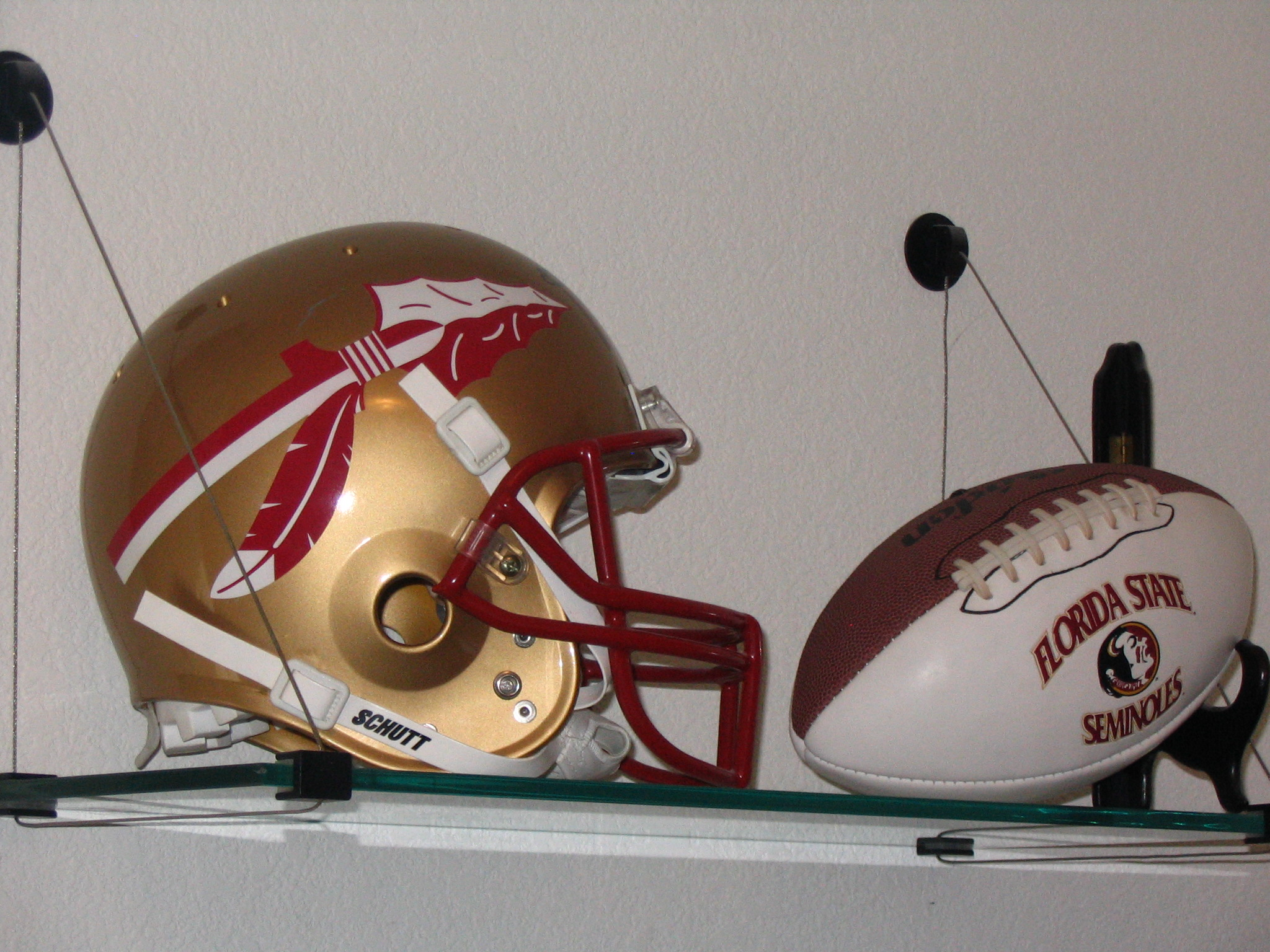
The spear design has been used on FSU's helmets since 1976.

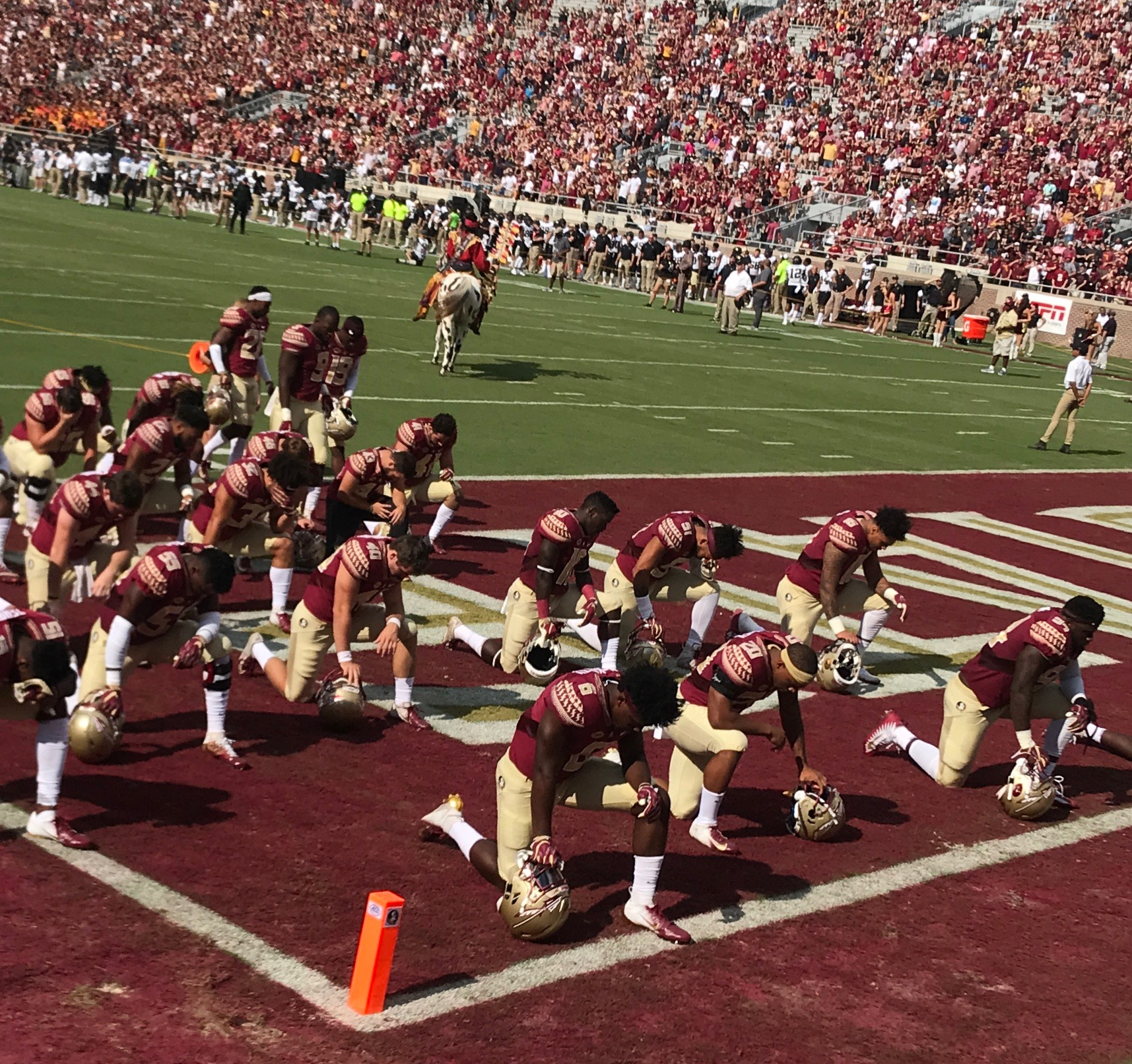
Seminole players in Florida State's traditional garnet and gold uniforms

There are numerous Florida State traditions associated with athletics, particularly football. These include the mascots, Osceola and Renegade, the planting of the spear at midfield before football games, the FSU Fight Song, the FSU Hymns, the War Chant, the Tomahawk Chop, and the Legacy Walk. The team's uniforms pay respect to the Seminole culture using tribal influences with Native American symbols representing an arrow, a man on a horse, and fire. The Seminole tribe is also recognized with the playing of Seminole Wind at the start of the second quarter during home games. Fans of the Florida State Seminoles are known as The Tribe, a nod to the nickname that the team carries.

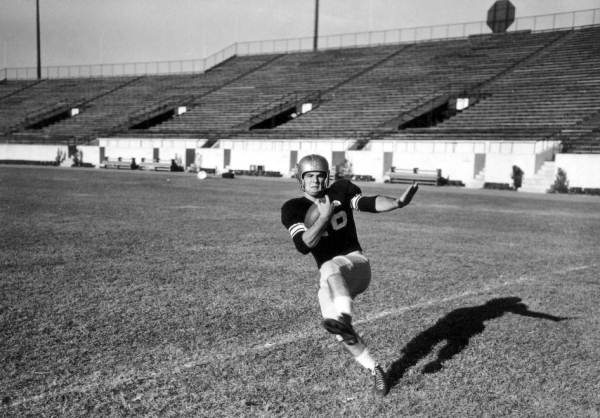
Burt Reynolds is honored during the start of the fourth quarter at each home game as East Bound and Down from the film Smokey and the Bandit (in which he starred) is played as a tribute.

=== Osceola and Renegade ===
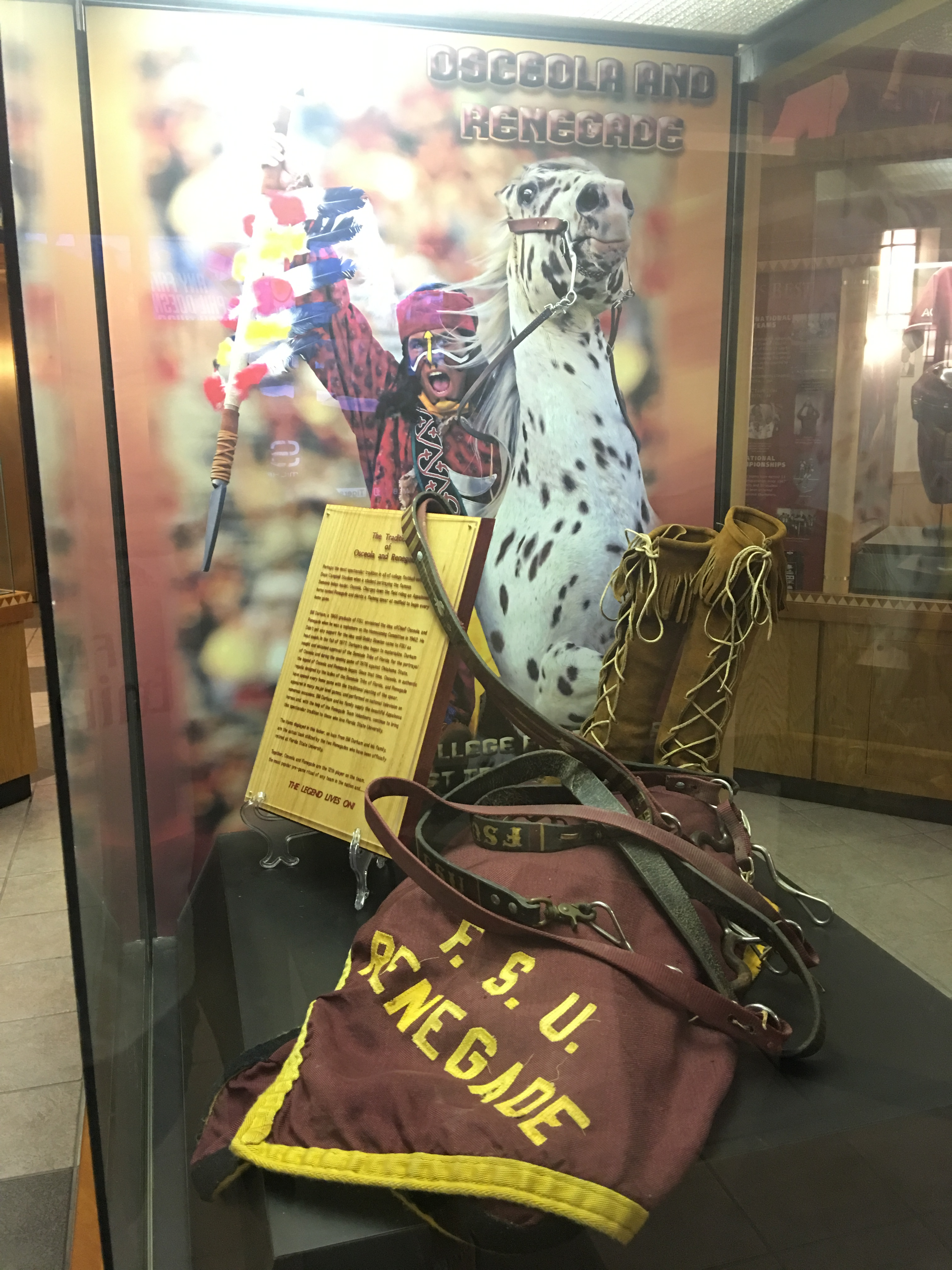
Osceola and Renegade were introduced in the 1978 season.

Osceola and Renegade are the official symbols of the Florida State Seminoles. During home football games, Osceola, portraying the Seminole leader Osceola, charges down the field at Doak Campbell Stadium riding an appaloosa horse named Renegade, and hurls a burning spear at midfield to begin every game. The Seminole Tribe of Florida officially sanctions the use of the Seminole as Florida State University's nickname and of Osceola as FSU's symbol.

=== Marching Chiefs ===
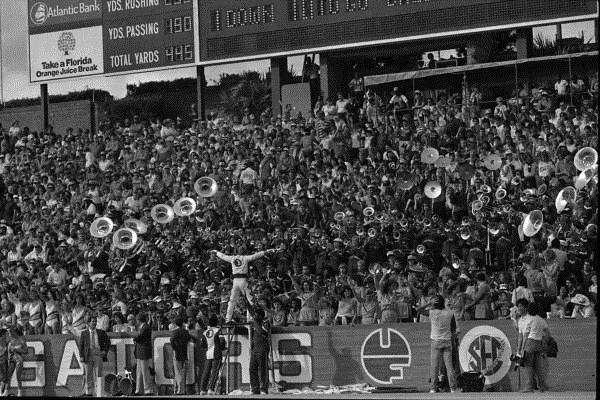
The Marching Chiefs were formed in 1949.

The Marching Chiefs is the official marching band of the Florida State Seminoles. The band plays at every home game as well as at some away games (Clemson, Miami, and Florida) as well as any championship or bowl game.

=== War Chant ===
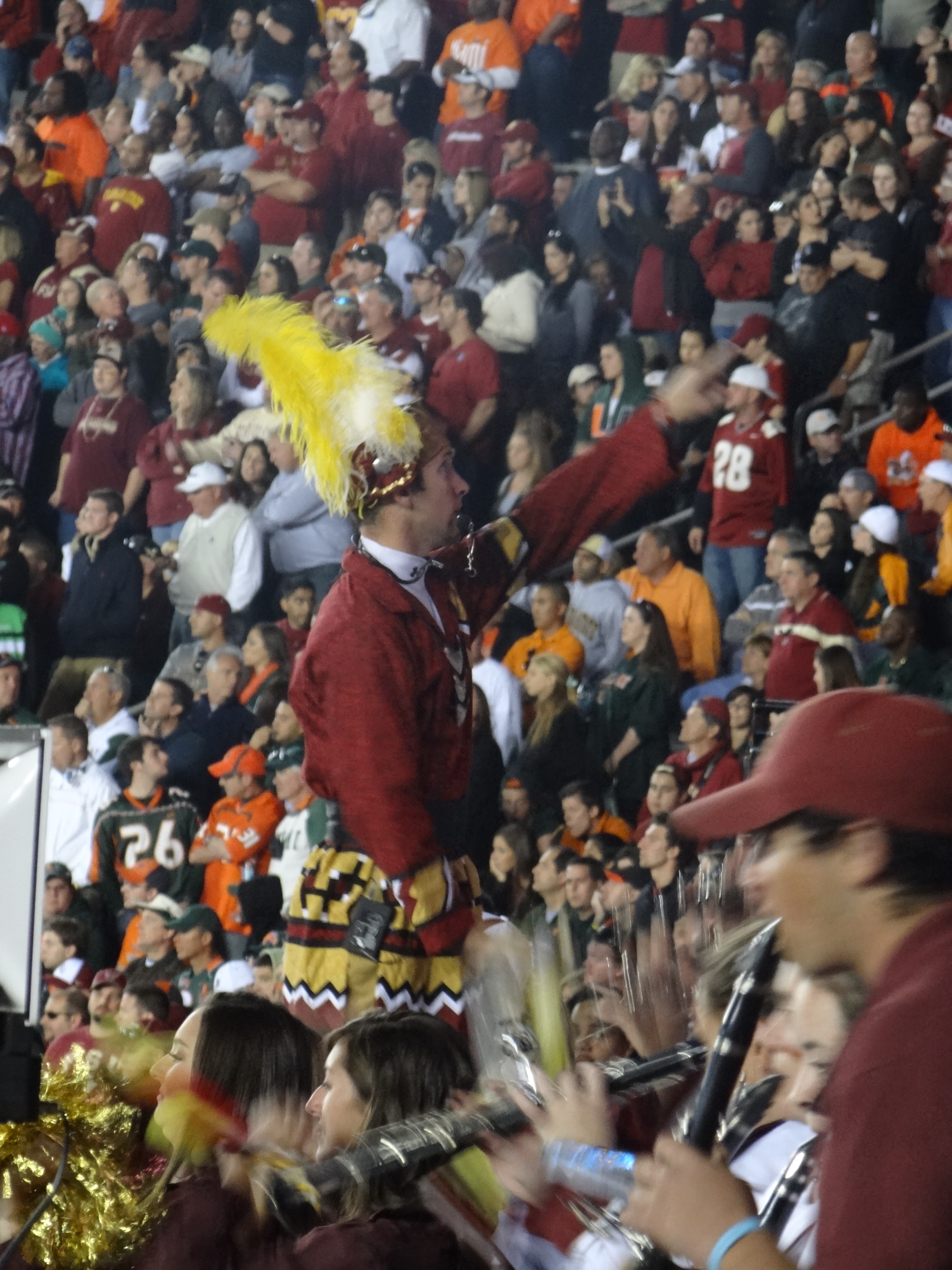
The Marching Chiefs hold the distinction of being the world's largest collegiate marching band, with upwards of 400 members.

The Seminole War Chant was first used in a 1984 game against Auburn. The chant was started in FSU's Marching Band – The Marching Chiefs, originally by members of the percussion section. The melody is based on the 1960s cheer, massacre. The chant has also become associated with the tomahawk chop.

The War Chant would be adopted by the Atlanta Braves when FSU football alumnus Deion Sanders joined the team, and has been used ever since. Craig Day began the Chop at now-defunct Fulton County stadium in response to UF Gator fans doing the Gator Chomp every time Deion came up to the plate. It is also used by the NFL team the Kansas City Chiefs, Mexican soccer club Santos Laguna and the Turkish soccer club Galatasaray.

=== Sod Cemetery ===
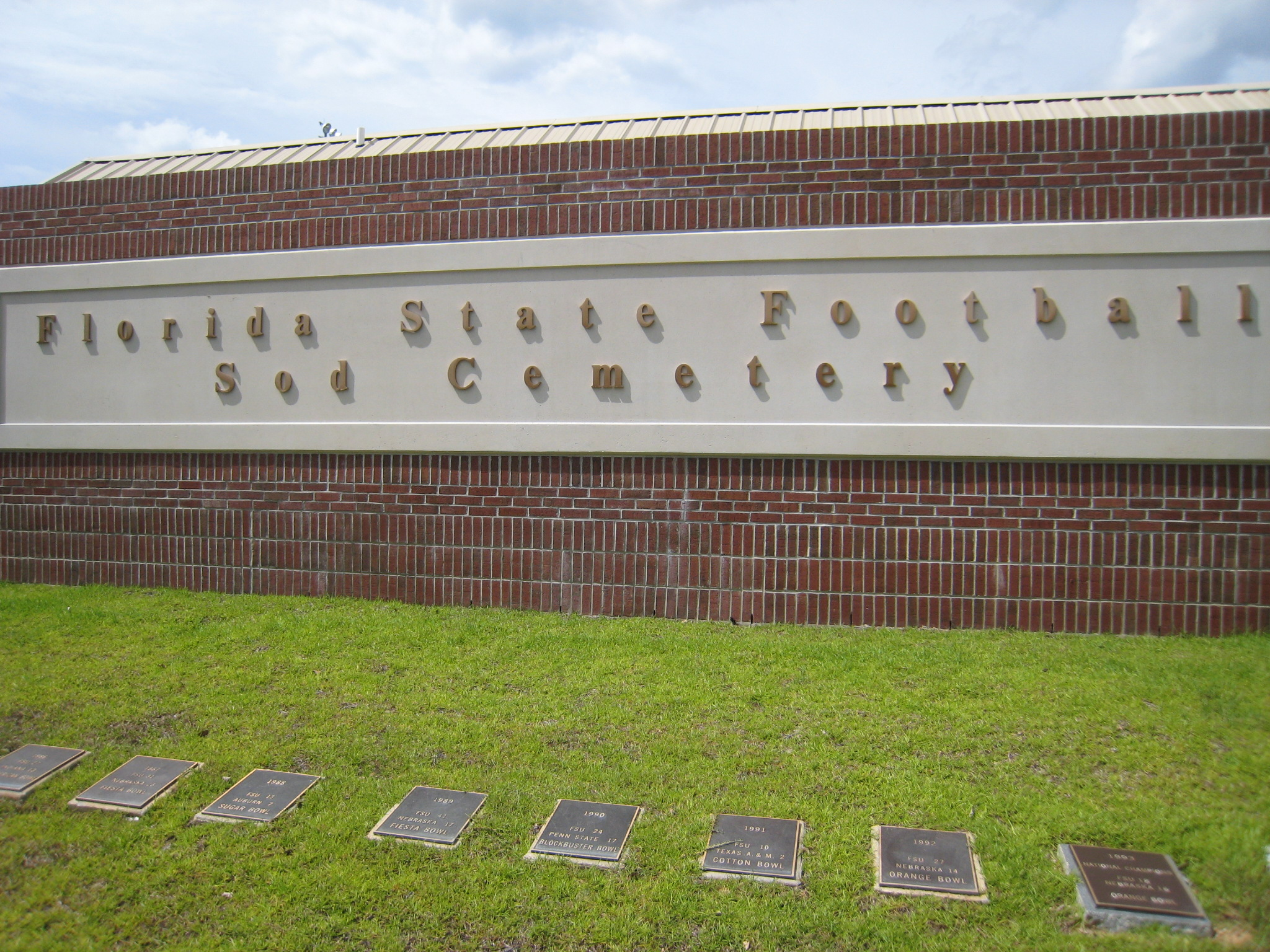
Florida State Football's Sod Cemetery is the final resting place for over 100 Sod Games.

Florida State's Sod Cemetery is a rich part of the program's history. When FSU wins a difficult away game, a piece of turf is pulled from the field and buried in the cemetery. Florida State sod games represent the most difficult battles on the football field. The Sod Cemetery stands as a tribute to those triumphs. There are 112 pieces of sod in the cemetery.

In 1962, as the Seminoles completed their Thursday practice in preparation to face Georgia at Sanford Stadium, Dean Coyle Moore – a long-time professor and member of FSU's athletic board – issued a challenge: "Bring back some sod from between the hedges at Georgia." On Saturday, October 20, the Seminoles scored an 18–0 victory over the favored Bulldogs. Team captain Gene McDowell pulled a small piece of grass from the field, which was presented to Moore at the next football practice. Moore and FSU coach Bill Peterson had the sod buried on the practice field as a symbol of victory. A monument was placed to commemorate the triumph and the tradition of the sod game was born.

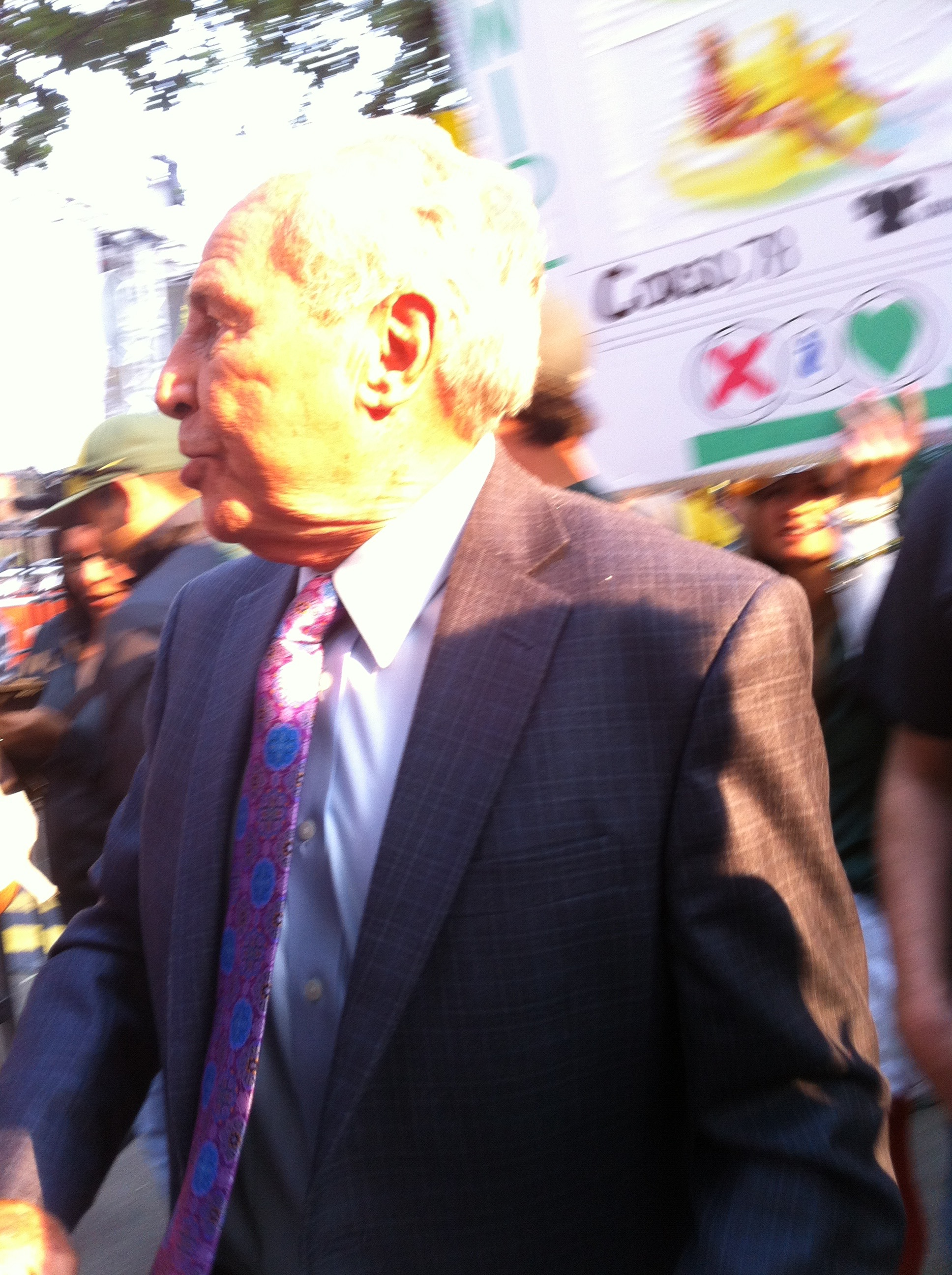
Lee Corso picked the Seminoles eighteen times for his traditioal headgear pick on College Gameday.

Before leaving for all road games in which Florida State is the underdog, all road games at the University of Florida and all ACC championship and bowl games, Seminole captains gather their teammates to explain the significance of the tradition. Victorious captains return with a piece of the opponent's turf to be buried in the Sod Cemetery inside the gates of the practice field. In recent years, as the Florida State program has been successful, games of significance regardless of whether or not the Seminoles are the underdog, can be designated a "sod game."

== Famous former players ==
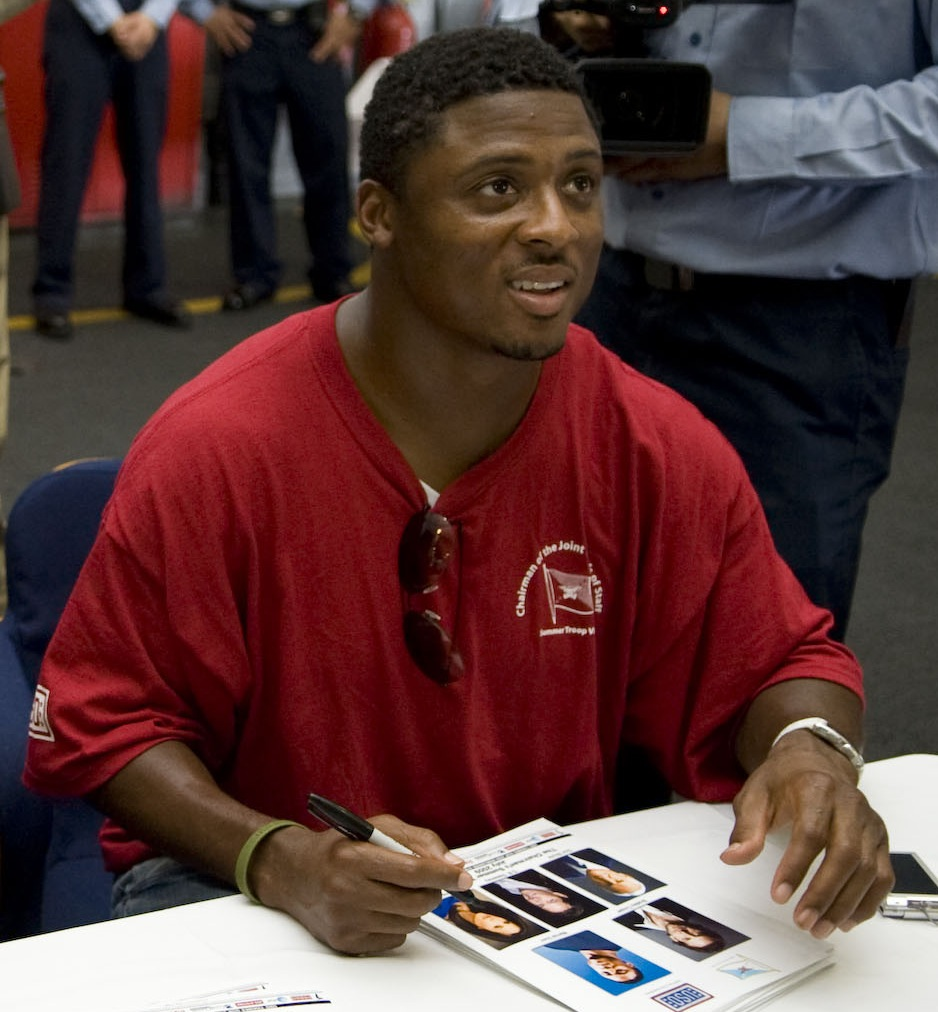
Warrick Dunn is one of three Seminoles to have received the NFL's Walter Payton Man of the Year Award.

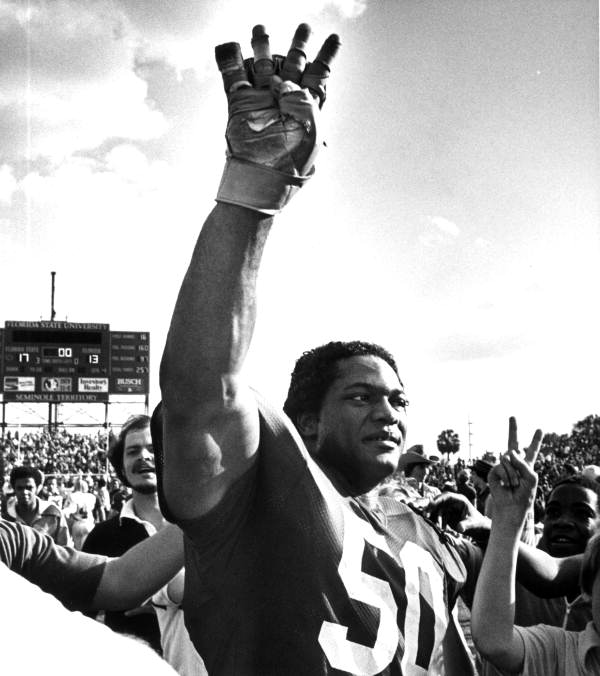
Ron Simmons was a defensive tackle for the Seminoles before going on to have a career in the WWE.

Seventy-six former players have gone on to play in the Super Bowl with two, Fred Biletnikoff and Dexter Jackson, being named the Super Bowl MVP. Three former Seminoles (Derrick Brooks, Warrick Dunn and Anquan Boldin) have won the Walter Payton Award.

- Lee Corso – Retired college football head coach, former College GameDay analyst
- Burt Reynolds – Actor
- Ron Simmons – former professional wrestler
- Mack Brown – Former head coach of the North Carolina Tar Heels and the Texas Longhorns

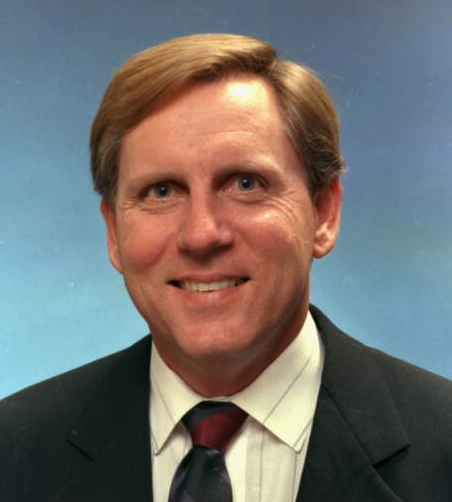
T.K. Wetherell played for the Seminoles from 1963 to 1967 and later served as the university's president from 2003 to 2009.

- T. K. Wetherell – Former President of Florida State University
- Deion Sanders – Hall of Fame NFL player, head college football coach, football analyst and celebrity personality, is the only player to play in both the World Series and Super Bowl.
- Robert Urich - Actor and television producer

=== Seminoles in the NFL ===
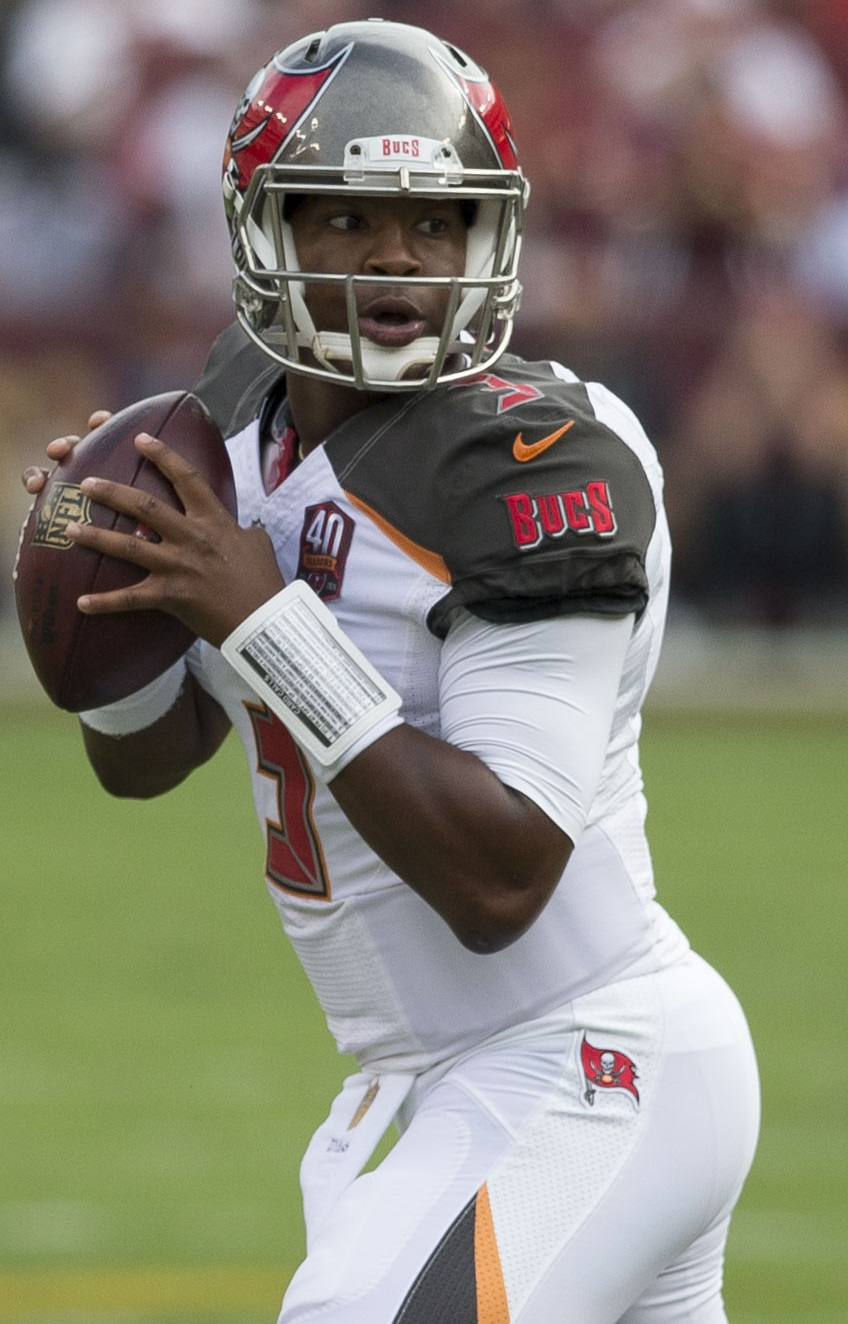
Jameis Winston is the highest draft pick in school history.

Florida State has sent 307 players to the National Football League since 1951, including 47 first-round draft picks.Florida State has had a player drafted in each draft since 1984. Jameis Winston holds the record as the highest Seminole taken in the NFL draft as he was selected with the first overall pick by Tampa Bay in the 2015 draft. Eleven players, a school record, were taken in the 2013 NFL draft, a record tied in 2015.

==== Active NFL Players ====
As of October 2026, 24 former Florida State Seminoles players are on an NFL roster.

- Trey Benson, Arizona Cardinals
- Josh Sweat, Arizona Cardinals
- Keon Coleman, Buffalo Bills
- Ryan Fitzgerald, Carolina Panthers
- Jared Verse, Cleveland Browns
- Mario Edwards Jr., Houston Texans
- Jarrian Jones, Jacksonville Jaguars
- Derwin James, Los Angeles Chargers
- DJ Uiagalelei, Los Angeles Chargers
- Braden Fiske, Los Angeles Rams
- Keir Thomas, Los Angeles Rams
- Joshua Farmer, New England Patriots
- Brian Burns, New York Giants
- Jameis Winston, New York Giants
- Darrell Jackson Jr., New York Jets
- Azareye'h Thomas, New York Jets
- Johnny Wilson, Philadelphia Eagles
- Jalen Ramsey, Pittsburgh Steelers
- Asante Samuel Jr., Pittsburgh Steelers
- Bobby Hart, Seattle Seahawks
- Tatum Bethune, San Francisco 49ers
- Renardo Green, San Francisco 49ers
- Kevin Knowles, Tampa Bay Buccaneers
- Jermaine Johnson II, Tennessee Titans

== Future opponents ==
=== Conference ===
Permanent Conference Opponents
Clemson
Miami

=== Non-conference ===
By decree of the Florida Board of Regents, Florida State and Florida must play each other every year.

2026	2027	2028	2029	2030	2032	2036
New Mexico State	Louisiana–Monroe	vs Georgia^{1}	Notre Dame	at Notre Dame	Notre Dame	Notre Dame
at Alabama	East Tennessee State					
Central Arkansas	at Florida					
Florida		Florida	at Florida	Florida	Florida	Florida

1. Nissan Stadium, Nashville, Tennessee

== See also ==
- Florida State Seminoles
- List of Florida State University people § Athletes
