= 2000 Buffalo Bills season =

41st season in franchise history

- Owner: Ralph Wilson
- General manager: John Butler
- Head coach: Wade Phillips
- Home stadium: Ralph Wilson Stadium

Results
- Record: 8–8
- Division place: 4th AFC East
- Playoffs: Did not qualify
- Pro Bowlers: WR Eric Moulds; G Ruben Brown; DT Ted Washington; LB Sam Cowart

The 2000 Buffalo Bills season was the team's 41st and 31st as part of the National Football League. The Bills total offense ranked 9th in the league and their total defense ranked 3rd in the league. The 2000 season was the first since the 1987 season that long-time Bills players Bruce Smith, Andre Reed and Thurman Thomas were not on the team together, as all three were released just days after the Bills were eliminated from the 1999 playoffs. Smith and Reed signed with the Redskins, while Thomas signed with the Dolphins. The Buffalo Bills finished in fourth place in the AFC East and finished the National Football League's 2000 season with a record of 8 wins and 8 losses. Though the Bills were 7–4 after eleven games, they lost their next four in a row, only avoiding a losing season in the final game of the year.

The 2000 season marked a turning point in Buffalo's history. From 2000 until 2016, the Bills would fail to make the playoffs, a streak that would end in 2017. Before the 2000 season ended, general manager John Butler was fired on December 19. He ended up taking the same position with the San Diego Chargers.

== Quarterback controversy ==
Doug Flutie led the Bills to a 10–5 record in 1999 but, in a controversial decision, was replaced by Rob Johnson for the playoffs by coach Wade Phillips, who later said he was ordered to do so by Bills owner Ralph Wilson. The Bills lost, 22–16 to the eventual AFC champion Tennessee Titans in a game that has become known as the Music City Miracle, where the Titans scored on the penultimate play of the game—a kickoff return following the Bills' apparent game-clinching field goal with 16 seconds left. After the season ended, Flutie was named the Bills' backup and only played late in games or when Johnson was injured; the two split playing time in seven games. Despite posting a 4–1 record, Flutie was released at the end of the 2000 season. Johnson would spend an injury-plagued 2001 season with the Bills before also being released.

== Special teams futility and the end of the Phillips era ==
Phillips was fired on January 8, 2001. Wilson cited the refusal of Phillips to fire special teams coach Ronnie Jones.

Football statistics site Football Outsiders calculated that the 2000 Bills had the worst special teams unit of any single-season team from 1993 to 2010. Said Wilson at the time, "Buffalo special teams' record was among the worst in the National Football League last season. ... I felt we needed a change and that my request was reasonable... I did not want to release Wade, but his refusal left me with no option." Said Football Outsiders of Buffalo's special teams in 2000, "Could special teams possibly be that negative? Oh, yes. They could. The 2000 Buffalo Bills had the worst special teams of any team in any season for which [Football Outsiders has] data. I would not be shocked if they had the worst special teams of all time, except maybe for some expansion teams in the sixties and seventies. Everything about special teams was horrible for the Bills that year, but Steve Christie was the biggest black hole among a galaxy of sucking black holes. ...Christie's average kickoff went only 55.6 yards, 7.5 yards less than the league average. And the bad kickoffs didn't just come late in the season in Buffalo's usual snow and wind. ...On the season, 18 of his kickoffs went for 50 yards or less. No other kicker had more than 10 kicks that short. ...Buffalo allowed opponents kick returns worth 22 points more than the league average. ...So the average opposing drive after a Buffalo kickoff started at the 37-yard line. Wow."

According to sources, Wilson had not expected Phillips to essentially tie himself to Jones as an "act of insubordination." Buffalo hired Tom Donahoe to become the new general manager the following season. Donahoe hired Tennessee Titans defensive coordinator Gregg Williams to be the head coach in a season which saw the rebuilding team struggle to a 3–13 record.

== Offseason ==
Additions	Subtractions
CB Chris Watson (Broncos)	DE Bruce Smith (Redskins)
	LB Dan Brandenburg (Eagles)
	LB Gabe Northern (Vikings)
	WR Andre Reed (Broncos)
	RB Thurman Thomas (Dolphins)
	WR Kevin Williams (49ers)
	FB Sam Gash (Ravens)
	LB Sean Moran (Rams)
	CB Thomas Smith (Bears)

=== NFL draft ===
2000 Buffalo Bills draft
Round	Pick	Player	Position	College	Notes
1	26	Erik Flowers	DE	Arizona State	
2	58	Travares Tillman	FS	Georgia Tech	
3	89	Corey Moore	LB	Virginia Tech	
4	121	Avion Black	WR	Tennessee State	
5	156	Sammy Morris	RB	Texas Tech	
6	194	Leif Larsen	DE	UTEP	
7	233	Drew Haddad	WR	Buffalo	
7	251	DaShon Polk	LB	Arizona	
Made roster † Pro Football Hall of Fame * Made at least one Pro Bowl during career

=== Undrafted free agents ===
2000 undrafted free agents of note
Player	Position	College
Askari Adams	Defensive back	Penn State
David Byrd	Defensive back	Syracuse
Jon Carman	Tackle	Georgia Tech
Kwame Cavil	Wide receiver	Texas
Dustin Cohen	Linebacker	Miami (OH)
Jason Corle	Running back	Towson
Phil Crosby	Running back	Tennessee
Reggie Durden	Cornerback	Florida State
Ivan Gustafson	Tight end	Whitworth
Jay Hill	Cornerback	Utah
Courtney Jackson	Defensive back	Arizona State
Fred Jones	Linebacker	Colorado
Keith Kelsey	Linebacker	Florida
Jarrett Procell	Defensive end	Louisiana Tech
Spencer Riley	Center	Tennessee
Josh Roth	Fullback	Buffalo
Phil Stambaugh	Quarterback	Lehigh
Corey Sullivan	Wide receiver	Tennessee State
Mike Tosaw	Offensive line	Missouri Southern
Jason Van Dyke	Punter	Adams State
Nathaniel Williams	Defensive Tackle	Virginia Tech
Kenyatta Wright	Linebacker	Oklahoma State

== Personnel ==
=== Staff ===
2000 Buffalo Bills staff
Front office: President – Ralph Wilson; Executive vice president/general manager – John Butler; Vice president of player personnel – Dwight Adams; Director of pro personnel – A. J. Smith; Head coaches: Head coach/vice president of football operations – Wade Phillips; Offensive coaches: Offensive coordinator – Joe Pendry; Quarterbacks – Turk Schonert; Running backs – James Saxon; Wide receivers – Charlie Joiner; Tight ends – Max Bowman; Offensive line – Carl Mauck; Offensive quality control – Chris Dickson	Defensive coaches: Defensive coordinator – Ted Cottrell; Defensive line – John Levra; Linebackers – Chuck Lester; Defensive backs – Bill Bradley; Special teams coaches: Special teams – Ronnie Jones; Strength and conditioning: Strength and conditioning coordinator – Rusty Jones

=== Roster ===
2000 Buffalo Bills roster
Quarterbacks (QB): 7 Doug Flutie; 11 Rob Johnson; 10 Alex Van Pelt; Running backs (RB): 38 Shawn Bryson; 35 Jonathan Linton FB; 45 Sammy Morris; 23 Antowain Smith; Wide receivers (WR): 89 Avion Black KR; 82 Kwame Cavil; 86 Jeremy McDaniel; 80 Eric Moulds; 81 Peerless Price; Tight ends (TE): 84 Bobby Collins; 88 Sheldon Jackson; 85 Jay Riemersma	Offensive linemen (OL): 66 Victor Allotey G; 79 Ruben Brown G; 65 Jon Carman T; 63 Bill Conaty C; 70 John Fina T; 77 Robert Hicks T; 74 Jamie Nails G; 60 Jerry Ostroski C; 72 Joe Panos G; 69 Marcus Spriggs T; Defensive linemen (DL): 96 Erik Flowers DE; 90 Phil Hansen DE; 97 Leif Larsen NT; 91 Shawn Price DE; 92 Ted Washington NT; 75 Marcellus Wiley DE; 93 Pat Williams	Linebackers (LB): 56 Sam Cowart ILB; 55 Jay Foreman ILB; 52 John Holecek ILB; 99 Fred Jones OLB; 54 Corey Moore OLB; 53 Keith Newman OLB; 51 DaShon Polk ILB; 59 Sam Rogers OLB; 98 Kenyatta Wright ILB; Defensive backs (DB): 29 Keion Carpenter FS; 25 Donovan Greer CB; 39 Raion Hill SS; 24 Ray Hill CB; 27 Ken Irvin CB; 20 Henry Jones SS; 22 Daryl Porter CB; 28 Travares Tillman FS; 21 Chris Watson; Special teams (ST): 76 Ethan Albright LS; 2 Steve Christie K; 9 Chris Mohr P	Practice squad: 71 Corey Hulsey G; 73 Jarrett Procell DE; 44 Josh Roth FB; Reserve: 95 Bryce Fisher DE (Military); 30 Courtney Jackson CB (IR); 26 Antoine Winfield CB (IR); Rookies in italics 53 active, 3 reserve, 3 practice squad

== Preseason ==
Week	Date	Opponent	Result	Record	Venue
1	August 4	Cincinnati Bengals	W 21–20	1–0	Ralph Wilson Stadium
2	August 12	at Detroit Lions	L 13–15	1–1	Pontiac Silverdome
3	August 19	at St. Louis Rams	W 31–27	2–1	Trans World Dome
4	August 24	at Philadelphia Eagles	W 16–12	3–1	Veterans Stadium

== Regular season ==
=== Schedule ===
Week	Date	Opponent	Result	Record	Venue	Attendance
1	September 3	Tennessee Titans	**W** 16–13	1–0	Ralph Wilson Stadium	72,492
2	September 10	Green Bay Packers	**W** 27–18	2–0	Ralph Wilson Stadium	72,722
3	September 17	at **New York Jets**	**L** 14–27	2–1	Giants Stadium	77,884
4	Bye					
5	October 1	**Indianapolis Colts**	**L** 16–18	2–2	Ralph Wilson Stadium	72,617
6	October 8	at **Miami Dolphins**	**L** 13–22	2–3	Pro Player Stadium	73,901
7	October 15	San Diego Chargers	**W** 27–24 (OT)	3–3	Ralph Wilson Stadium	72,351
8	October 22	at Minnesota Vikings	**L** 27–31	3–4	Hubert H. Humphrey Metrodome	64,116
9	October 29	**New York Jets**	**W** 23–20	4–4	Ralph Wilson Stadium	72,861
10	November 5	at **New England Patriots**	**W** 16–13 (OT)	5–4	Foxboro Stadium	60,292
11	November 12	Chicago Bears	**W** 20–3	6–4	Ralph Wilson Stadium	72,420
12	November 19	at Kansas City Chiefs	**W** 21–17	7–4	Arrowhead Stadium	78,457
13	November 26	at Tampa Bay Buccaneers	**L** 17–31	7–5	Raymond James Stadium	65,546
14	December 3	**Miami Dolphins**	**L** 6–33	7–6	Ralph Wilson Stadium	73,002
15	December 11	at **Indianapolis Colts**	**L** 20–44	7–7	RCA Dome	56,671
16	December 17	**New England Patriots**	**L** 10–13 (OT)	7–8	Ralph Wilson Stadium	47,230
17	December 23	at Seattle Seahawks	**W** 42–23	8–8	Husky Stadium	61,025
Note: Intra-division opponents are in **bold** text.

=== Game summaries ===
==== Week 1: Tennessee Titans ====
Quarter	1	2	3	4	Total
Titans	0	6	0	7	**13**
**Bills**	0	7	3	6	**16**

at Ralph Wilson Stadium

- Date: September 3
- Game time: 8:20 p.m. EST
- Game weather: 70 °F (21 °C), wind 7 mph (11 km/h)
- TV announcers (ESPN): Mike Patrick, Joe Theismann, Paul Maguire and Solomon Wilcots
- Box Score

Scoring summary

Quarter	Time	Drive			Team	Scoring information	Score	
Quarter	Time	Plays	Yards	TOP	Team	Scoring information	Titans	Bills
2					Bills	Peerless Price 15-yard touchdown reception from Rob Johnson, Steve Christie kick good	0	7
2					Titans	38-yard field goal by Al Del Greco	3	7
2					Titans	27-yard field goal by Al Del Greco	6	7
3					Bills	42-yard field goal by Steve Christie	6	10
4					Bills	41-yard field goal by Steve Christie	6	13
4					Titans	Eddie George 2-yard touchdown run, Al Del Greco kick good	13	13
4	0:35				Bills	33-yard field goal by Steve Christie	13	16
"TOP" = time of possession. For other American football terms, see Glossary of American football.							13	16

==== Week 2: vs. Green Bay Packers ====
Team	1	2	3	4	Total
Packers	0	0	10	8	18
• **Bills**	0	10	10	7	27

- Date: September 10
- Location: Ralph Wilson Stadium, Orchard Park, New York
- Game start: 1:00 p.m. EST
- Game weather: 73 °F (23 °C), wind 7 mph (11 km/h)
- TV announcers (FOX): Ray Bentley, Ron Pitts and Bob Trimble
- Source: Pro-Football-Reference.com

Scoring summary
2	Bills	Jeremy McDaniel 6 yard pass from Rob Johnson (Steve Christie kick)	Bills 7–0
2	Bills	Steve Christie 45 yard field goal	Bills 10–0
3	Bills	Jay Riemersma 6 yard pass from Rob Johnson (Steve Christie kick)	Bills 17–0
3	Packers	Antonio Freeman 7 yard pass from Brett Favre (Ryan Longwell kick)	Bills 17–7
3	Bills	Steve Christie 20 yard field goal	Bills 20–7
3	Packers	Ryan Longwell 24 yard field goal	Bills 20–10
4	Bills	Jay Riemersma 14 yard pass from Rob Johnson (Steve Christie kick)	Bills 27–10
4	Packers	Antonio Freeman 18 yard pass from Brett Favre (Tyrone Davis pass from Brett Favre)	Bills 27–18

==== Week 3: at New York Jets ====
	1	2	3	4	Total
Bills	7	7	0	0	**14**
**Jets**	7	14	3	3	**27**

at Giants Stadium, East Rutherford, New Jersey

- Date: September 17, 2000
- Game time: 1:00 p.m. EST
- TV: CBS
- Announcers: Dick Enberg, Dan Dierdorf and Bonnie Bernstein

The 2–0 Bills traveled to New Jersey to take on the 2–0 Jets in a battle for first place in the AFC East. However, numerous blunders by the Bills, particularly on special teams, assured that they would receive their first loss of the season.

The Bills opened the scoring with Rob Johnson throwing a 3-yard touchdown pass to Eric Moulds for a 7–0 lead. But on the very next play, Jets kick returner Kevin Williams returned the ensuing kickoff 97 yards for a game tying touchdown. In the second quarter, the Jets drove to the Bills' 5-yard line when the Bills held on a 3rd and 1. Jets coach Al Groh elected to go for it, and on the fourth down play, running back Curtis Martin broke through for a 5-yard touchdown run to make it 14–7 Jets. With 1:17 to go, the Bills faced a third down at their own 26-yard line when Johnson went long for receiver Jeremy McDaniel. Two Jets defenders misplayed the ball, and McDaniel caught the pass and went in untouched for the 74-yard touchdown to tie the game at 14 with 1:07 to go in the half. However, the Bills' worst play of the game came at the end of the half. With time expiring at the end of the half, Jets QB Vinny Testaverde heaved a Hail Mary towards the end zone, and Marcus Coleman, who checked into the game as an eligible receiver for the Hail Mary attempt, caught the pass between numerous Bills defenders. This score made it 21–14 Jets at the half.

The Bills never recovered from this turn of events as the second half was defined by numerous costly errors. On the first possession of the second half, veteran kicker Steve Christie missed a 45-yard field goal. With the Bills trailing 24–14 at the beginning of the fourth quarter they drove into Jets territory. Rob Johnson then completed a pass to Peerless Price to get the Bills into the red zone, but he fumbled and the ball was recovered by the Jets. The Bills defense forced a three and out on the next possession. On the ensuing punt, Bills cornerback Chris Watson started up the middle then cut to the right sideline, but Chris Hayes, who was blocked at the beginning of the play but got back up as the play continued, hit Watson from behind and forced him to fumble, with the Jets recovering the ball. Finally, Watson muffed a short punt later in the quarter, which was recovered by Hayes.

Although the Bills outgained the Jets 354–279 with Rob Johnson completing 21 of 36 passes for 293 yards and 2 touchdowns with one interception, the Bills committed four turnovers compared to just one by the Jets.

With the loss, the Bills fell to 2–1 heading into their bye week.

==== Week 5: vs. Indianapolis Colts ====
	1	2	3	4	Total
Colts	0	7	0	11	**18**
**Bills**	3	6	0	7	**16**

at Ralph Wilson Stadium, Orchard Park, New York

- Date: October 1, 2000
- Game time: 1:00 p.m. EST
- TV: CBS
- Announcers: Gus Johnson and Brent Jones

The Bills hosted the Colts in a Week 5 divisional matchup.

Although the Bills dominated the first half, they failed to convert three red zone drives into touchdowns, and settled for three Steve Christie field goals to make it 9–0 in the second quarter. A Peyton Manning touchdown pass to Marvin Harrison made it 9–7 Bills at the half. In the fourth quarter, Manning found Terrence Wilkins for a 10-yard touchdown pass, and a two-point conversion made it 15–9 Colts. With 1:08 to go, Rob Johnson went long for Eric Moulds, who caught the pass for a 40-yard touchdown to make it 16–15 Bills. However, the Colts drove to the Bills' 28-yard line, and kicker Mike Vanderjagt made a 45-yard field goal as time expired to win the game for the Colts.

==== Week 6: at Miami Dolphins ====
	1	2	3	4	Total
Bills	3	0	0	10	**13**
**Dolphins**	3	10	2	7	**22**

at Pro Player Stadium, Miami Gardens, Florida

- Date: October 8, 2000
- Game time: 1:00 p.m. EST
- TV: CBS
- Announcers: Dick Enberg, Dan Dierdorf and Bonnie Bernstein

The Bills traveled next to South Florida to take on the Dolphins. Much interest in the game revolved around longtime Bills running back Thurman Thomas, who had signed with the Dolphins in the offseason and who was playing his first game against his former team.

The Bills trailed 13–3 at halftime, with the primary score being Dolphins QB Jay Fiedler's 20-yard touchdown pass to Leslie Shepherd. In the third quarter, a Matt Turk punt pinned the Bills at their own 1-yard line, and on second down on the ensuing drive, running back Jonathan Linton was stuffed in the end zone for a safety to make it 15–3. In the fourth quarter, the Bills began to come back. The Bills drove to the Dolphins' 5-yard line, but again, Rob Johnson failed to get the Bills into the end zone and they settled for a field goal. On their next drive, the Bills went inside the 5 again, and this time scored a touchdown with rookie running back Sammy Morris breaking a tackle on a 3-yard touchdown run. The Bills then got the ball back with 4:59 to go with a chance to take the lead. Rob Johnson threw a screen pass to Morris, but in his effort to gain extra yards, he was stripped of the football by Miami cornerback Sam Madison, and fellow corner Patrick Surtain returned the fumble 20 yards for a touchdown. On the next drive, Johnson was forced to leave the game due to an injury, and Doug Flutie received his first action of the season. Flutie's first play was a 25-yard pass to Jeremy McDaniel to convert a 3rd and 21, but another Flutie miracle would not happen as Jerry Wilson intercepted Flutie later in the drive to clinch the win for the Dolphins.

The game was dominated by the Dolphin defense. Aside from their safety and touchdown, they sacked the Bills quarterbacks 6 times, with 5 coming with Rob Johnson under center. Dolphins lineman Trace Armstrong led the defense with 3.5 sacks. Both the Bills and Dolphins gained 254 yards in this contest.

==== Week 7: vs. San Diego Chargers ====
	1	2	3	4	OT	Total
Chargers	3	7	14	0	0	**24**
**Bills**	0	14	0	10	3	**27**

at Ralph Wilson Stadium, Orchard Park, New York

- Date: October 15, 2000
- Game time: 1:00 p.m. EST
- TV: CBS
- Announcers: Craig Bolerjack and Charles Mann

With the Bills hosting the 0–6 Chargers, it was widely expected that the Bills would get back on track upon returning home for their Week 7 matchup. But what ensued was a hard-fought victory rather than a dominant one.

After Chargers kicker John Carney opened the scoring with a field goal to make it 3–0, the Bills scored two unanswered touchdowns. Sammy Morris ran for a 32-yard touchdown to make it 7–3. On the next drive, running back Jonathan Linton fumbled at the one-yard line, but lineman Jerry Ostroski fell on the ball in the end zone for a rare offensive lineman touchdown, making the score 14–3 Bills. However, the Chargers took over for the next one and a half quarters. Chargers quarterback Jim Harbaugh found Curtis Conway for a touchdown to make it 14–10 at the half. In the third quarter, a Jermaine Fazande two-yard touchdown run and a 51-yard touchdown pass from Harbaugh to Jeff Graham made it 24–14 Chargers heading into the final quarter. Early in the fourth quarter, Rob Johnson found running back Shawn Bryson for an 11-yard touchdown to make it 24–21. With 2:33 left, the Bills got the ball back, needing at least a field goal to force overtime. Johnson drove the Bills into the red zone, but barely avoided a disastrous turnover with 11 seconds left when his pass on 3rd and goal was nearly intercepted by Junior Seau. The Bills settled for a 29-yard field goal by Steve Christie to force overtime.

In overtime, Rob Johnson was knocked out of the game after being hit upon throwing a pass, and the Bills were forced to punt. Safety Henry Jones intercepted Jim Harbaugh on the next possession, and with Johnson out of the game, Doug Flutie came off the bench to lead the Bills. Flutie got the Bills into field goal range for Steve Christie. Christie's first attempt from 41 yards was no good as it sailed wide of the goalpost, but the play was nullified due to a false start. This made Christie's second attempt 46 yards, but this attempt went just over the crossbar for the game-winning field goal.

Before being knocked out of the game, Rob Johnson was 29 of 47 for 321 yards with 1 touchdown and 1 interception. Eric Moulds caught 11 passes for 170 yards.

==== Week 8: at Minnesota Vikings ====
	1	2	3	4	Total
Bills	0	10	7	10	**27**
**Vikings**	3	3	7	18	**31**

at Metrodome, Minneapolis, Minnesota

- Date: October 22, 2000
- Game time: 12:00 p.m. CST (1:00 p.m. EST)
- TV: CBS
- Announcers: Dick Enberg, Dan Dierdorf and Bonnie Bernstein

The Bills' next game was at Minnesota against the undefeated Vikings. With Rob Johnson out due to the injury he sustained the previous week, Doug Flutie made his first start of the season.

Throughout the game, the Bills demonstrated the potential for an upset bid. The Bills led 10–6 at halftime, helped by a 25-yard touchdown pass from Doug Flutie to Eric Moulds. After the Vikings took a 13–10 lead on a Daunte Culpepper touchdown pass to Cris Carter, the Bills went on a 13-play, 80-yard drive, ending with Sammy Morris's one-yard touchdown run. On the next drive, linebacker Sam Rogers intercepted Culpepper, and the Bills capitalized with Flutie hitting Morris for an 18-yard touchdown to make it 24–13. The Vikings then scored a touchdown with Culpepper throwing another touchdown to Carter with 9:34 to go, with a two-point conversion making it 24–21. Bills kicker Steve Christie kicked a 48-yard field goal to make it 27–21. However, with 3:48 to go, Daunte Culpepper rolled right, then threw a bomb deep towards the left side of the end zone. Vikings receiver Randy Moss got behind two Bills defenders, caught the pass, and kept both feet in bounds for the go-ahead touchdown. On the Bills' next drive, Peerless Price lost a fumble, setting up the Vikings with a short field. The Bills' defense held, and the Vikings settled for Gary Anderson kicking a 21-yard field goal to make it 31–27. Anderson's field goal represented his 2,004th total point in the NFL, making him the NFL's all-time leading scorer (Morten Andersen eventually surpassed his record). This historic accomplishment being said, the Bills still had a chance to win. Starting from their own 20-yard line, Flutie drove the Bills to the 42-yard line in the game's final moments. But his Hail Mary attempt at the end of the game fell incomplete.

Doug Flutie went 28 of 43 for 294 yards and 2 touchdowns, while Eric Moulds caught 12 passes for 135 yards and a touchdown.

==== Week 9: vs. New York Jets ====
	1	2	3	4	Total
Jets	7	0	10	3	**20**
**Bills**	7	10	0	6	**23**

at Ralph Wilson Stadium, Orchard Park, New York

- Date: October 29, 2000
- Game time: 1:00 p.m. EST
- TV: CBS
- Announcers: Dick Enberg, Dan Dierdorf and Bonnie Bernstein

With the Bills at 3–4 and 0–3 in the division, they were in a must-win situation upon returning home to face the Jets. The Jets were 6–1 and in first place in the AFC East coming off their comeback from a 23-point fourth-quarter deficit the previous Monday Night against the Dolphins, a game now known as the Monday Night Miracle.

The two teams traded touchdowns in the opening quarter. Running back Sammy Morris went in with a 1-yard plunge for the Bills to strike first, then Jets quarterback Vinny Testaverde found Fred Baxter for a 12-yard touchdown pass to tie it at 7–7. In the second quarter, the Bills took over. The Bills defense forced Testaverde to throw two interceptions, one of which was intercepted by safety Henry Jones and returned 45 yards for a touchdown to make it 17–7. At the end of the quarter the Jets were driving inside the Bills' red zone, but Sam Rogers sacked Testaverde and forced him to fumble, and linebacker Sam Cowart recovered the ball to end the drive.

Although the Bills were up by 10 heading into the second half, no one considered the game a sure win at this point, especially considering that four of the Jets' six wins at this point were come-from-behind wins. And sure enough, the Jets came back to tie the score at 17 by the end of the third quarter. Vinny Testaverde found receiver Wayne Chrebet for a 10-yard touchdown pass to tie the score. In the fourth quarter, the Bills drove into field goal range, but Steve Christie's go-ahead field goal attempt was blocked. On the ensuing drive, Bills linebacker Keith Newman forced the usually sure-handed Jets running back Curtis Martin to fumble, and Sam Cowart recovered the ball for his second fumble recovery of the day. On the next play, Doug Flutie went long and hit Eric Moulds for a 52-yard bomb that got the Bills to the Jets' 1-yard line, but an offensive pass interference pushed the Bills back from the goal line and they settled for Christie's 29-yard field goal to make it 20–17 Bills with 6:18 to go. The Jets then drove into field goal range, when the Bills defense held and forced the Jets to settle for John Hall's field goal with 2:25 to go to tie the score at 20. Doug Flutie then led the Bills in the waning moments of the game to the Jets' 14-yard line before taking an intentional loss of yards to get the ball in the middle of the field for Steve Christie's game-winning field goal attempt. Christie's attempt from 32 yards was good as time expired.

==== Week 10: at New England Patriots ====
	1	2	3	4	OT	Total
Bills	3	7	0	3	3	**16**
**Patriots**	0	3	0	10	0	**13**

at Foxboro Stadium, Foxborough, Massachusetts

- Date: November 5, 2000
- Game time: 1:00 p.m. EST
- TV: CBS
- Announcers: Don Criqui and Steve Tasker

The Bills traveled to Foxborough to take on the New England Patriots. With the Patriots at 2–6 heading into the game having lost three straight games, the Bills were the favorite to win the game, but the game turned into a tough battle that took a fifth quarter to decide a winner.

Early in the game, Patriots quarterback (and future Bill) Drew Bledsoe injured a finger on his throwing hand when throwing a pass, during which his hand struck another player's helmet in the process. Due to the lingering effects of the injury, he was unable to return to the game. As his replacement, Patriots coach Bill Belichick turned not to then-rookie and future 7-time Super Bowl champion Tom Brady, but veteran John Friesz to lead the Patriots against the Bills for the remainder of the game.

Given the Patriots' record and the loss of their starting quarterback, the first half looked like it would be an easy win for the Bills. The Bills jumped out to a 10–0 lead when Doug Flutie found tight end Jay Riemersma for a 9-yard touchdown pass. But with 1:11 to go in the half, Flutie fumbled a snap, which was recovered by the Patriots' Willie McGinest in Bills territory to set up an Adam Vinatieri 48-yard field goal to make it 10–3 Bills at the half. This set the tone for the remainder of the game.

After a poor punt by Bills punter Chris Mohr and an 18-yard return by Patriots receiver Troy Brown, the Patriots had great position at the Bills' 34 to start a drive with 10:28 to go in the third quarter, and they drove to the Bills' 1-yard line. Rather than play it safe and run the ball, New England attempted to pass at the goal line and the Bills capitalized with linebacker John Holecek intercepting John Friesz's pass in the end zone to end the scoring opportunity. In the fourth quarter, another good punt return by Brown (this one 25 yards) set up another Patriots drive that reached the Bills' one-yard line. Two running plays were stuffed by the Bills line, and an incomplete pass brought up fourth and goal at the 1. The Patriots went for it, and rookie running back J.R. Redmond got the necessary yardage with a one-yard touchdown run to tie the score at 10–10 with 9 minutes remaining. Another poor special teams play by the Bills (a 37-yard punt followed by a 12-yard return) set up the Patriots in good field position with 3:53 to go with a chance to take the lead, and Adam Vinatieri kicked a 43-yard field goal with just over 2 minutes remaining, giving the Patriots a 13–10 lead. Doug Flutie got the Bills into field goal range with a 24-yard pass to Jeremy McDaniel and an 11-yard scramble before a controversial play occurred. With the Bills at the Patriots' 20-yard line with 13 seconds left, Flutie found Peerless Price at the goal line for a pass that would at least get the Bills to the Patriots' one-yard line in the waning moments of the game, and which potentially could have been a touchdown due to Price knocking over the goal line's pylon in the process. However, the officials ruled that Price had committed pass interference in order to make the catch, and a potential touchdown turned into a 10-yard penalty to push the Bills back to the brink of Steve Christie's range. With no timeouts left, the Bills sent out Christie to attempt a 48-yard field goal, and his attempt went just barely over the crossbar to tie the score at 13 and force overtime.

In overtime, the Patriots got the ball first, but the Bills forced them to punt and drove down the field for Steve Christie's game-winning 32-yard field goal.

Although the Bills outgained the Patriots 315–189, poor special teams play gave the Patriots good field position to start their drives. Nonetheless, this win put the Bills back above .500 with a 5–4 record.

==== Week 11: vs. Chicago Bears ====
	1	2	3	4	Total
Bears	0	3	0	0	**3**
**Bills**	0	6	7	7	**20**

at Ralph Wilson Stadium, Orchard Park, New York

- Date: November 12, 2000
- Game time: 1:00 p.m. EST
- TV: FOX
- Announcers: Ray Bentley, Ron Pitts and Bob Trimble

The Bills' next game was against the 2–7 Bears at home. After the score was 6–3 Bills at halftime, the Bills took over the hapless Bears in the second half. Doug Flutie ran in for a one-yard touchdown in the third quarter to make it 13–3. The game's most notable play was the Bills' game-clinching score with less than three minutes to go. The Bears were driving at the Bills' 32-yard line when linebacker Sam Rogers forced Bears quarterback Shane Matthews to fumble. Linebacker Keith Newman recovered the loose ball and began rumbling down the field before Bears receiver Eddie Kennison hustled down the field and forced Newman to also fumble, but nickel corner Daryl Porter recovered the fumble and ran the remaining 23 yards for a touchdown to make it 20–3 Bills.

The Bills forced four turnovers in the game, three interceptions and the aforementioned fumble.

Of particular note regarding this game involved the quarterback controversy between Doug Flutie and Rob Johnson. Although Johnson was healthy again as this game approached, Bills coach Wade Phillips kept Flutie as the starter coming off two straight wins, but also gave Johnson a few snaps at quarterback. This strategy at quarterback would change, however, as the season progressed.

==== Week 12: at Kansas City Chiefs ====
	1	2	3	4	Total
Bills	7	0	0	14	**21**
**Chiefs**	0	3	7	7	**17**

at Arrowhead Stadium, Kansas City, Missouri

- Date: November 19, 2000
- Game time: 1:00 p.m. EST (12:00 p.m. CST)
- TV: CBS
- Announcers: Gus Johnson and Brent Jones

Although Doug Flutie had won his last three starts heading into this game, head coach Wade Phillips turned to a now-healthy Rob Johnson as his starting quarterback for this game. Johnson led the Bills on their opening drive to a touchdown, capped by a 9-yard touchdown pass to Eric Moulds. The score was 7–3 at the half.

In the third quarter, a 13-yard touchdown pass from Chiefs quarterback Elvis Grbac to tight end Tony Gonzalez gave the Chiefs a 10–7 lead heading into the final quarter. Early in the fourth quarter, Rob Johnson threw over the middle for the end zone for Jay Riemersma. His pass was nearly intercepted by a Chiefs defender, but he dropped the potential interception and the ball bounced behind him right into Riemersma's waiting arms to make the score 14–10. The Chiefs answered with Grbac hitting Gonzalez for his second touchdown of the day to make it 17–14 with just under 8 minutes to go. With the help of a pass interference penalty by the Chiefs, the Bills drove to the Chiefs' 3-yard line for a 1st and goal. A four-yard loss on a running play and a sack set up 3rd and goal at the 12-yard line with 3:06 to go. Rob Johnson dropped back to pass, then ran towards the left sideline when he dove for the end zone and was hit out of bounds by Chiefs linebacker Marvcus Patton. Johnson was initially ruled out at the 1, but the Bills challenged, and replays showed that while he was being hit out of bounds, Johnson had reached over the pylon with the football, and the call was reversed to a touchdown to make the score 21–17. On the ensuing drive, the Chiefs drove to the Bills' 25-yard line by the two-minute warning, but Grbac was intercepted by Keion Carpenter to end the scoring threat. The Chiefs defense used up their remaining timeouts to force a three-and-out to get one last chance to potentially win the game. However, Grbac's Hail Mary attempt was broken up by Eric Moulds, who checked into the game as a defender for the Hail Mary attempt.

With this win, the Bills had won their fourth straight game and were in the middle of a crowded AFC playoff race. They were one game behind the division-leading Dolphins, and at 7–4 were tied with the Colts and Jets for second place in the AFC East.

==== Week 13: at Tampa Bay Buccaneers ====
	1	2	3	4	Total
Bills	0	7	0	10	**17**
**Bucs**	3	7	0	21	**31**

at Raymond James Stadium, Tampa, Florida

- Date: November 26, 2000
- Game time: 1:00 p.m. EST
- TV: CBS
- Announcers: Dick Enberg, Dan Dierdorf and Bonnie Bernstein
- Referee: Ed Hochuli

The Bills traveled to Tampa to take on the 6–5 Bucs in a must-win game for both teams to stay in the playoff race in their respective conferences.

Although the Bills defense harassed the Tampa Bay offense, holding them to 180 yards of total offense and sacking Shaun King seven times, including three consecutive plays in the first half with Sam Cowart and Ted Washington (in a combined effort), Cowart again, and Marcellus Wiley all contributing sacks during this span, the Bills trailed 10–7 heading into the final quarter. With the often-sacked Rob Johnson back under center, the Bucs sacked him 6 times during the game.

In the fourth quarter, Bucs running back Warrick Dunn scored on a 6-yard touchdown run to make it 17–7 with under 12 minutes to go. The Bills answered with Rob Johnson hitting Eric Moulds for a 19-yard touchdown with 9 minutes to go. With 5:52 to go, the Bills were forced to punt, and Bucs punt returner Karl Williams returned the ensuing punt 73 yards for a touchdown to make it 24–14. On the Bills' next drive, Johnson was violently thrown to the ground by Derrick Brooks in a hit that knocked him out of the game, but somehow, Johnson flipped the ball to Shawn Bryson as he was being tackled and a sure sack became a 15-yard gain to set up a Steve Christie field goal to make it 24–17 with 2:30 to go. The Bills attempted an onside kick, but the Bucs recovered. Two plays later, Dunn broke through the Bills' defense for a 39-yard touchdown run to clinch the game.

The Bills lost even though they outgained the Bucs 433–180 and held the ball for 36:17 compared to the Bucs' 23:43.

==== Week 14: vs. Miami Dolphins ====
	1	2	3	4	Total
Dolphins	7	17	6	3	**33**
**Bills**	0	0	0	6	**6**

at Ralph Wilson Stadium, Orchard Park, New York

- Date: December 3, 2000
- Game time: 1:00 p.m. EST
- TV: CBS
- Announcers: Dick Enberg, Dan Dierdorf, and Bonnie Bernstein
- Referee: Mike Carey

With the Bills at 7–5 and behind the AFC wild card spots by a game, they were in a must-win situation at home against the division-leading Dolphins. It was expected that given the cold weather expected for the game in Buffalo and the Bills' history of defeating the Dolphins throughout the 1990s, the Bills would at least be competitive. However, the Dolphins dominated all afternoon.

Dolphins quarterback Jay Fiedler, back after missing the team's previous game, opened the scoring by finding running back Lamar Smith on a screen pass for a 6-yard touchdown to make it 7–0. In the second quarter, a spectacular one-handed catch by Dolphins receiver Oronde Gadsden set up a 6-yard touchdown from Fiedler to Gadsden to make it 14–0. On the ensuing drive, Rob Johnson was sacked on consecutive plays, then on third down was intercepted by Sam Madison, who went on a lengthy return, juking and avoiding numerous Bills defenders from sideline to sideline before finally going down on his own at the Bills' 11. This set up an Olindo Mare field goal to make it 17–0. A 14-yard touchdown from Fiedler to Leslie Shepherd made it 24–0 Dolphins at the half, and the score was 30–0 heading into the final quarter.

The Dolphins defense completely harassed Rob Johnson, who went 6-of-18 for just 44 yards and 2 interceptions while being sacked 5 times. Johnson was benched for Doug Flutie, who also played poorly, going 2-of-9 for 31 yards and an interception.

This loss not only ended the Bills' chances of winning the AFC East with the team now 3 games behind the Dolphins, but put them 2 games behind the final Wild Card berth in the AFC playoffs.

==== Week 15: at Indianapolis Colts ====
	1	2	3	4	Total
Bills	3	3	6	8	**20**
**Colts**	3	6	14	21	**44**

at RCA Dome, Indianapolis, Indiana

- Date: December 11, 2000
- Game time: 9:00 p.m. EST
- TV: ABC
- Announcers: Al Michaels, Dennis Miller, Dan Fouts, Melissa Stark and Eric Dickerson

The Bills traveled to Indianapolis to face the Colts in a Monday night game with high stakes for both teams. With both teams at 7–6 and 1 1/2 games behind the final AFC wild card spot (the Jets having lost the previous night), both teams needed to win in order to stay alive in the playoff race.

The first half was relatively low scoring, with the Colts leading 9–6 at halftime. But the floodgates opened in the second half on the Bills. After Colts running back Edgerrin James scored a touchdown, Rob Johnson was sacked on the ensuing possession by Jeff Burris and forced to fumble, with lineman Bernard Holsey recovering the loose ball and returning it 48 yards for a touchdown to make the score 23–6. The Bills' ensuing drive ended with a Sammy Morris one-yard touchdown to make it 23–12 heading into the final quarter due to a failed two-point conversion. With 10:16 to go in the game, James scored another touchdown for the Colts, and three plays later, Johnson was intercepted by the Colts' Mustafah Muhammad for a 40-yard interception return for a touchdown to make it 37–12 Colts. After this play, Johnson was benched again for Doug Flutie, who led the Bills down the field and threw a 29-yard touchdown to Peerless Price with just over 6 minutes to go, with the two-point conversion making the score 37–20. However, Edgerrin James's third touchdown of the day with 4:18 to go clinched the game for the Colts.

The Colts scored 44 points despite the Bills holding the Colts to just 237 yards of total offense and Peyton Manning having only 132 yards passing. The Colts had 9 sacks, with Rob Johnson being sacked a whopping 8 times.

This loss eliminated the Bills from playoff contention.

==== Week 16: vs. New England Patriots ====
	1	2	3	4	OT	Total
Patriots	3	0	0	7	3	**13**
**Bills**	0	3	0	7	0	**10**

at Ralph Wilson Stadium, Orchard Park, New York

- Date: December 17, 2000
- Game time: 1:00 p.m. EST
- Game Weather: Snow 36 °F (2 °C) Wind 25 mph (40 km/h)
- TV: CBS (blacked out locally)
- Announcers: Gus Johnson and Brent Jones

In their final home game of the year, the Bills faced the Patriots. Due to high winds that reached up to 25 mph (40 km/h) and a snowstorm that intensified as the game progressed, passing from both teams was severely limited with the two teams combining for 88 rushing attempts in the game.

The Bills and Patriots traded field goals and reached a 3–3 stalemate at halftime. During the first half, Rob Johnson was injured again upon being hit during a pass attempt, ending his season. Doug Flutie came in for the second quarter as the snowstorm began to take full effect. Both teams blew chances to take the lead in the third quarter. A 23-yard field goal attempt by Steve Christie was blocked by Patriots defensive end Chad Eaton, and the Patriots were stopped on a 4th-and-1 when linebacker Keith Newman stuffed Patriots running back Tony Carter on a rushing attempt. In the fourth quarter, the teams finally found the end zone. Flutie took off for a 32-yard run to the Patriots' 1-yard line, and then found Sheldon Jackson for a 1-yard touchdown pass to make it 10–3. After both teams exchanged punts, the Patriots scored on a 13-yard touchdown run by Kevin Faulk to tie the score at 10 with just under 5 minutes to go. In the final moments of regulation, Drew Bledsoe drove the Patriots to the Bills' 10-yard line, but Adam Vinatieri missed the field goal from 27 yards, and the game went into overtime.

In overtime, Doug Flutie led the Bills into field goal range, but Steve Christie's 30 yard attempt with 6:22 remaining was blocked again by Chad Eaton. The Patriots then drove inside the Bills' red zone with about 3 minutes to go, which would normally be enough to send in the kicker for a game-winning field goal. But the blinding snowstorm had intensified by this point, the wind had reached its peak strength and the snow was so dense visibility was poor for both teams, so the Patriots kept driving with the game dangerously close to being a tie. They finally ended their drive at the Bills' 6-yard line with just 23 seconds remaining, and this time, Adam Vinatieri's 24-yard attempt was good to win the game for the Patriots. Bills general manager John Butler would be fired two days later.

On the ESPN show NFL Primetime, this was the only non-primetime game for the Bills that season that was not set to the song "Powersurge." It was assigned that week to Colts–Dolphins instead.

==== Week 17: at Seattle Seahawks ====
	1	2	3	4	Total
**Bills**	21	7	7	7	**42**
Seahawks	7	7	3	6	**23**

at Husky Stadium, Seattle, Washington

- Date: December 23, 2000
- Game time: 5:30 p.m. PST (8:30 p.m. EST)
- TV: ESPN
- Announcers: Mike Patrick, Joe Theismann, Paul Maguire, and Solomon Wilcots

The Bills' disappointing season ended on a high note in a Saturday night game at Seattle. The Bills jumped out to a 21–7 lead in the first quarter, with Doug Flutie hitting Shawn Bryson and Peerless Price for touchdown passes. After Seahawks kick returner (and future Bill) Charlie Rogers returned the ensuing kickoff 81 yards for a touchdown, the Bills answered with running back Antowain Smith scoring on a 9-yard touchdown run to make it 21–7. Seahawks quarterback Jon Kitna scored on a 1-yard run to make the score 21–14 in the second quarter, but Flutie then hit Jay Riemersma on a 6-yard touchdown pass to make it 28–14 at the half. Smith then added two more touchdown runs in the second half.

Doug Flutie achieved a perfect passer rating in his final game as a Buffalo Bill, going 20-of-25 with 366 yards and 3 touchdowns with no interceptions. Antowain Smith, also playing his final game as a Bill, ran for 147 yards and 3 touchdowns on just 17 carries. The Bills amassed 579 yards of total offense.

== Standings ==
AFC East
	W	L	T	PCT	PF	PA	STK
^{(3)} Miami Dolphins	11	5	0	.688	323	226	W1
^{(6)} Indianapolis Colts	10	6	0	.625	429	326	W3
New York Jets	9	7	0	.563	321	321	L3
Buffalo Bills	8	8	0	.500	315	350	W1
New England Patriots	5	11	0	.313	276	338	L1

== Awards and records ==
- Ruben Brown, AFC Pro Bowl Selection,
- Sam Cowart, AFC Pro Bowl Selection,
- Bob Kalsu's name was added to the Buffalo Bills Wall of Fame
- Eric Moulds, AFC Pro Bowl Selection,
- Ted Washington, AFC Pro Bowl Selection,
