= 1999 Buffalo Bills season =

40th season in franchise history

- Owner: Ralph Wilson
- General manager: John Butler
- Head coach: Wade Phillips
- Home stadium: Ralph Wilson Stadium

Results
- Record: 11–5
- Division place: 2nd AFC East
- Playoffs: Lost Wild Card Playoffs (at Titans) 16–22 (Note: This game is also known as the Music City Miracle)
- Pro Bowlers: FB Sam Gash; G Ruben Brown

The 1999 Buffalo Bills season was the 30th season for the team in the National Football League (NFL) and 40th overall. It would be the final season that Bruce Smith, Andre Reed, and Thurman Thomas — the last three players remaining from all four of the Bills' Super Bowl teams — were on the same team together. All three were released at the end of the season due to salary cap issues.

The Bills surrendered only 229 points (14.3 points per game), the lowest total in franchise history in a 16-game season, and second-fewest in the league. (Note: Jacksonville allowed 217 points) Buffalo's 2,675 passing yards and 4,045 total yards allowed were both the fewest totals in the NFL in 1999.

The Bills finished in second place in the AFC East and finished the National Football League's 1999 season with a record of 11 wins and 5 losses. The Bills qualified for the postseason for the eighth time in the decade. They would lose to the Titans 22–16, in the game called "Music City Miracle".

The team would not make the playoffs again until 2017, where they were defeated by the Jacksonville Jaguars in the Wild Card round. They also would not have another 10 win season until 2019.

== Offseason ==
Additions	Subtractions
TE Eric Stocz (Lions)	WR Quinn Early (Jets)
	QB Jim Ballard (CFL)

=== 1999 expansion draft ===
Bills selected during the expansion draft
Pick	Name	Position	Expansion team
22	Raymond Jackson	Cornerback	Cleveland Browns
32	Clarence Williams	Fullback	Cleveland Browns

=== NFL draft ===
1999 Buffalo Bills draft
Round	Pick	Player	Position	College	Notes
1	23	Antoine Winfield *	CB	Ohio St	
2	53	Peerless Price *	WR	Tennessee	
3	86	Shawn Bryson	RB	Tennessee	
4	119	Keith Newman	OLB	North Carolina	
4	122	Bobby Collins	TE	North Alabama	
5	156	Jay Foreman	ILB	Nebraska	
6	194	Armon Hatcher	S	Oregon St	
7	230	Lamount Jackson	QB	Kansas	
7	248	Bryce Fisher	DE	Air Force	
Made roster † Pro Football Hall of Fame * Made at least one Pro Bowl during career

=== Undrafted free agents ===
1999 undrafted free agents of note
Player	Position	College
Tony Akins	Wide Receiver	Northeast Louisiana
Reginald Allen	Wide Receiver	Central Michigan
Keion Carpenter	Safety	Virginia Tech
Zach Carter	Defensive tackle	South Dakota State
Kendall Cleveland	Running back	LSU
Brian Edwards	Fullback	East Tennessee State
Lennox Gordon	Running back	New Mexico
Anthony Gray	Running back	Western New Mexico
Mercedes Hamilton	Guard	Tennessee
Raion Hill	Safety	LSU
Bill Kushner	Punter	Boston College
Jeremy McDaniel	Wide receiver	Arizona
Andy Meyers	Guard	UCLA
Dusty Renfro	Linebacker	Texas
Robert Scott	Wide receiver	Utah State
Pene Talamaivao	Defensive tackle	Utah

== Personnel ==
=== Staff ===
1999 Buffalo Bills staff
Front office: President – Ralph Wilson; Executive vice-president/general manager – John Butler; Vice-president of football operations – Wade Phillips; Director of pro personnel – A. J. Smith; Director of player personnel – Dwight Adams; Head coaches: Head coach – Wade Phillips; Assistant to the head coach – Max Bowman; Offensive coaches: Offensive coordinator – Joe Pendry; Quarterbacks – Turk Schonert; Running backs – Bishop Harris; Receivers – Charlie Joiner; Tight ends – Max Bowman; Offensive line – Carl Mauck; Offensive quality control – Chris Dickson	Defensive coaches: Defensive coordinator – Ted Cottrell; Defensive line – John Levra; Linebackers – Chuck Lester; Defensive backs – Bill Bradley; Special teams coaches: Special teams – Bruce DeHaven; Strength and conditioning: Strength and conditioning coordinator – Rusty Jones

=== Roster ===
1999 Buffalo Bills roster
Quarterbacks (QB): 7 Doug Flutie; 11 Rob Johnson; 10 Alex Van Pelt; Running backs (RB): 33 Sam Gash FB; 31 Lennox Gordon; 35 Jonathan Linton; 23 Antowain Smith; 34 Thurman Thomas; Wide receivers (WR): 89 Kamil Loud; 86 Jeremy McDaniel; 80 Eric Moulds; 81 Peerless Price; 83 Andre Reed; 82 Kevin Williams; Tight ends (TE): 84 Bobby Collins; 88 Sheldon Jackson; 85 Jay Riemersma	Offensive linemen (OL): 66 Victor Allotey G; 79 Ruben Brown G; 63 Bill Conaty C; 70 John Fina T; 77 Robert Hicks T; 74 Jamie Nails G; 60 Jerry Ostroski C; 72 Joe Panos G; 69 Marcus Spriggs T; 61 Dusty Zeigler G; Defensive linemen (DL): 90 Phil Hansen DE; 91 Shawn Price DE; 78 Bruce Smith DE; 92 Ted Washington NT; 75 Marcellus Wiley DE; 93 Pat Williams NT	Linebackers (LB): 96 Dan Brandenburg OLB; 56 Sam Cowart ILB; 51 Joe Cummings ILB; 55 Jay Foreman OLB; 52 John Holecek ILB; 98 Sean Moran ILB; 53 Keith Newman OLB; 99 Gabe Northern OLB; 58 Marlo Perry ILB; 59 Sam Rogers OLB; Defensive backs (DB): 29 Keion Carpenter FS; 25 Donovan Greer CB; 20 Henry Jones SS; 22 Daryl Porter CB/S; 24 Kurt Schulz FS; 28 Thomas Smith CB; 26 Antoine Winfield CB; Special teams (ST): 76 Ethan Albright LS; 2 Steve Christie K; 9 Chris Mohr P	Practice squad: 39 Raion Hill S; Reserve: 38 Shawn Bryson RB (IR); 95 Bryce Fisher DE (Military); 27 Ken Irvin CB (IR); 21 Manny Martin CB/S (IR); 53 active, 4 inactive, 1 practice squad Rookies in italics

== Regular season ==
=== Schedule ===
Week	Date	Opponent	Result	Record	Venue	Attendance
1	September 12	at **Indianapolis Colts**	**L** 14–31	0–1	RCA Dome	56,238
2	September 19	**New York Jets**	**W** 17–3	1–1	Ralph Wilson Stadium	68,839
3	September 26	Philadelphia Eagles	**W** 26–0	2–1	Ralph Wilson Stadium	70,872
4	October 4	at **Miami Dolphins**	**W** 23–18	3–1	Pro Player Stadium	74,073
5	October 10	Pittsburgh Steelers	**W** 24–21	4–1	Ralph Wilson Stadium	71,038
6	October 17	Oakland Raiders	**L** 14–20	4–2	Ralph Wilson Stadium	71,113
7	October 24	at Seattle Seahawks	**L** 16–26	4–3	Kingdome	66,301
8	October 31	at Baltimore Ravens	**W** 13–10	5–3	PSINet Stadium	68,673
9	November 7	at Washington Redskins	**W** 34–17	6–3	Redskins Stadium	78,721
10	November 14	**Miami Dolphins**	**W** 23–3	7–3	Ralph Wilson Stadium	72,810
11	November 21	at **New York Jets**	**L** 7–17	7–4	Giants Stadium	79,285
12	November 28	**New England Patriots**	**W** 17–7	8–4	Ralph Wilson Stadium	72,111
13	Bye					
14	December 12	New York Giants	**L** 17–19	8–5	Ralph Wilson Stadium	72,527
15	December 19	at Arizona Cardinals	**W** 31–21	9–5	Sun Devil Stadium	64,337
16	December 26	at **New England Patriots**	**W** 13–10 (OT)	10–5	Foxboro Stadium	55,014
17	January 2	**Indianapolis Colts**	**W** 31–6	11–5	Ralph Wilson Stadium	61,959
Note: Intra-divisional games are in **bold** text.

=== Game summaries ===
==== Week 1 ====
Team	1	2	3	4	Total
Bills	0	6	8	0	14
• Colts	7	7	7	10	31

- Date: September 12
- Location: RCA Dome, Indianapolis, Indiana
- Game start: 1:00 p.m.
- Game weather: indoors (dome)
- TV announcers (CBS): Ian Eagle, and Mark May

==== Week 2 ====
Team	1	2	3	4	Total
Jets	0	0	3	0	3
• Bills	0	7	7	3	17

- Date: September 19
- Location: Ralph Wilson Stadium, Orchard Park, New York
- Game start: 8:20 p.m.
- Game weather: 62 °F (16.7 °C), wind 5 mph (8.0 km/h)
- TV announcers (ESPN): Mike Patrick, Joe Theismann and Paul Maguire

==== Week 3 ====
Team	1	2	3	4	Total
Eagles	0	0	0	0	0
• Bills	9	10	7	0	26

- Date: September 26
- Location: Ralph Wilson Stadium, Orchard Park, New York
- Game start: 1:00 p.m.
- Game weather: 60 °F (15.6 °C), wind 7 mph (11 km/h; 6.1 kn)
- TV announcers (Fox): Curt Menefee and Brian Baldinger

==== Week 4 ====
Team	1	2	3	4	Total
• Bills	3	10	0	10	23
Dolphins	6	3	0	9	18

- Date: October 4
- Location: Pro Player Stadium, Miami, Florida
- Game start: 9:00 p.m.
- Game weather: 82 °F (28 °C), wind 13 mph (21 km/h; 11 kn)
- Television network: ABC

==== Week 5 ====
Team	1	2	3	4	Total
Steelers	7	7	0	7	21
• Bills	7	10	7	0	24

- Date: October 10
- Location: Ralph Wilson Stadium, Orchard Park, New York
- Game start: 1:00 p.m.
- Game weather: 60 °F (16 °C), wind 8 mph (13 km/h; 7.0 kn)
- Referee: Ed Hochuli
- TV announcers (CBS): Verne Lundquist, Dan Dierdorf, and Bonnie Bernstein

==== Week 6 ====
Team	1	2	3	4	Total
• Raiders	10	3	7	0	20
Bills	7	0	0	7	14

- Date: October 17
- Location: Ralph Wilson Stadium, Orchard Park, New York
- Game start: 1:00 p.m. EST
- Game weather: 58 °F (14 °C), wind 12 mph (19 km/h; 10 kn)
- Referee: Johnny Grier
- TV announcers (CBS): Kevin Harlan, Sam Wyche

==== Week 7 ====
Team	1	2	3	4	Total
Bills	0	3	6	7	16
• Seahawks	13	10	0	3	26

- Date: October 24
- Location: Kingdome, Seattle, Washington
- Game start: 1:15 p.m.
- Game weather: indoors (dome)
- Referee: Tom White
- TV announcers (CBS): Greg Gumbel, Phil Simms, and Armen Keteyian

==== Week 8 ====
Team	1	2	3	4	Total
• Bills	0	3	0	10	13
Ravens	10	0	0	0	10

- Date: October 31
- Location: PSINet Stadium, Baltimore, Maryland
- Game start: 1:00 p.m.
- Game weather: 59 °F (15 °C), wind 4 mph (6.4 km/h; 3.5 kn)

==== Week 9 ====
Team	1	2	3	4	Total
• Bills	3	14	14	3	34
Redskins	7	3	0	7	17

- Date: November 7
- Location: Jack Kent Cooke Stadium, Washington, D.C.
- Game start: 1:00 p.m.
- Game weather: 55 °F (13 °C), wind 14 mph (23 km/h)

==== Week 10 ====
Team	1	2	3	4	Total
Dolphins	0	3	0	0	3
• Bills	9	7	7	0	23

- Date: November 14
- Location: Ralph Wilson Stadium, Orchard Park, New York
- Game start: 1:00 p.m.
- Game weather: 50 °F (10 °C), wind 19 mph (31 km/h; 17 kn)

==== Week 11 ====
Team	1	2	3	4	Total
Bills	0	0	7	0	7
• Jets	0	14	3	0	17

- Date: November 21
- Location: Giants Stadium, East Rutherford, New Jersey
- Game start: 1:00 p.m.
- Game weather: 58 °F (14.4 °C), wind 8 mph (13 km/h; 7.0 kn)

==== Week 12 ====
Team	1	2	3	4	Total
Patriots	0	0	0	7	7
• Bills	3	7	7	0	17

- Date: November 28
- Location: Ralph Wilson Stadium, Orchard Park, New York
- Game start: 1:00 p.m.
- Game weather: 39 °F (3.9 °C), wind 16 mph (26 km/h; 14 kn)

==== Week 14 ====
Team	1	2	3	4	Total
• Giants	3	10	3	3	19
Bills	3	7	0	7	17

- Date: December 12
- Location: Ralph Wilson Stadium, Orchard Park, New York
- Game start: 1:00 p.m.
- Game weather: 30 °F (−1.1 °C), wind 6 mph (9.7 km/h; 5.2 kn)

==== Week 15 ====
Team	1	2	3	4	Total
• Bills	14	0	3	14	31
Cardinals	0	14	0	7	21

- Date: December 19
- Location: Sun Devil Stadium, Tempe, Arizona
- Game start: 6:20 p.m.
- Game weather: 57 °F (13.9 °C), wind 4 mph (6.4 km/h; 3.5 kn)
- Referee: Johnny Grier
- TV announcers (ESPN): Mike Patrick, Joe Theismann, Paul Maguire, and Solomon Wilcots

==== Week 16 ====
Team	1	2	3	4	OT	Total
• Bills	3	0	0	7	3	13
Patriots	0	3	0	7	0	10

- Date: December 26
- Location: Foxboro Stadium, Foxboro, Massachusetts
- Game start: 1:00 p.m.
- Game weather: 29 °F (−1.7 °C), wind 18 mph (29 km/h; 16 kn)

==== Week 17 ====
Team	1	2	3	4	Total
Colts	3	3	0	0	6
• Bills	7	14	0	10	31

- Date: January 2
- Location: Ralph Wilson Stadium, Orchard Park, New York
- Game start: 1:00 p.m. EST
- Game weather: 44 °F (6.7 °C), wind 14 mph (23 km/h; 12 kn)
- Referee: Bob McElwee
- TV announcers (CBS): Verne Lundquist, Dan Dierdorf, and Bonnie Bernstein

== Standings ==
AFC East
	W	L	T	PCT	PF	PA	STK
^{(2)} Indianapolis Colts	13	3	0	.813	423	333	L1
^{(5)} Buffalo Bills	11	5	0	.688	320	229	W3
^{(6)} Miami Dolphins	9	7	0	.563	326	336	L2
New York Jets	8	8	0	.500	308	309	W4
New England Patriots	8	8	0	.500	299	284	W1

== Playoffs ==
=== AFC Wild Card ===
Team	1	2	3	4	Total
Bills	0	0	7	9	16
• Titans	0	12	0	10	22

- Date: January 8
- Location: Adelphia Coliseum, Nashville, Tennessee
- Game start: 12:30 p.m. EST
- Game attendance: 66,672
- Game weather: Cloudy, 58 °F or 14.4 °C
- Referee: Phil Luckett
- TV announcers (ABC): Mike Patrick, Joe Theismann, Paul Maguire, and Solomon Wilcots

The Music City Miracle is a famous play in the NFL Wild Card Playoffs involving the Tennessee Titans and Buffalo Bills that took place on January 8, 2000 (following the 1999 regular season) at Adelphia Coliseum in Nashville, Tennessee.

Going into the game, Bills coach Wade Phillips created a stir by starting quarterback Rob Johnson, rather than Doug Flutie, who had started 15 games and led the team to the playoffs. Late in the fourth quarter, the stage was set for an exciting finish. Tennessee received the ball with 6:15 remaining. Titans receiver Isaac Byrd's 16-yard punt return and five carries from Eddie George for 17 yards set up a wobbly 36-yard field goal by Del Greco. The Titans took a 15–13 lead with 1:48 to go. On the ensuing drive, with no timeouts remaining, Bills quarterback Johnson led the Bills on a five-play, 37-yard drive to the Titans' 24-yard line. On the last two plays from scrimmage, Johnson played with only one shoe on, as he had lost one and had no time to put it back on, with the clock running out. With only 16 seconds remaining in the game, Steve Christie, the Bills' kicker, made a 41-yard field goal to put Buffalo in the lead, 16–15.

Moments later, Christie kicked off, and Titans player Lorenzo Neal received. Neal handed the ball off to Titans tight end Frank Wycheck, who then passed the ball laterally, as ruled by the on field officials, across the field to another Titans player, Kevin Dyson, who then ran down the sidelines for a 75-yard touchdown. The play was named Home Run Throwback by the Titans and was developed by Special Teams Coordinator Alan Lowry.

==== Official review ====
Per the instant replay rules, the play was reviewed by referee Phil Luckett since it was uncertain if the ball had been a forward pass, which is illegal on a kickoff return. However, the call on the field was upheld as a touchdown, and the Titans won the game 22–16.

==== Aftermath ====
The victory, in front of a franchise-record crowd at Adelphia Coliseum, allowed the Tennessee franchise to advance to the divisional round of the AFC playoffs for the first time since 1993. Subsequent victories over the Indianapolis Colts and Jacksonville Jaguars sent the Titans to Super Bowl XXXIV to face the St. Louis Rams, where they lost by one yard.

It could be said that the game served as revenge for the Titans/Oilers franchise for The Comeback, where the Bills came back from a 32-point deficit to defeat the Houston Oilers, 41–38, in overtime. For the Bills, it led to the firing after 13 seasons of special teams coach Bruce DeHaven. One year later, Phillips was fired (partly due to his failure to lead the Bills past the first round of the playoffs during his tenure) and replaced by Titans defensive coordinator Gregg Williams. It was added to the list of infamous moments in Buffalo sports history, joining Wide Right and No Goal.

Buffalo would go on to miss the playoffs for seventeen seasons following the Music City Miracle, finally snapping its drought in 2017. Then the Bill lost in the Wild Card round to the Jacksonville Jaguars, and again to the Houston Texans in 2019, before finally ending the streak of playoff losses to AFC South opponents against yet another AFC South opponent, the Indianapolis Colts, in 2020.
