= 2003 Buffalo Bills season =

44th season in franchise history

- Owner: Ralph Wilson
- General manager: Tom Donahoe
- Head coach: Gregg Williams
- Home stadium: Ralph Wilson Stadium

Results
- Record: 6–10
- Division place: 3rd AFC East
- Playoffs: Did not qualify
- Pro Bowlers: G Ruben Brown; OLB Takeo Spikes

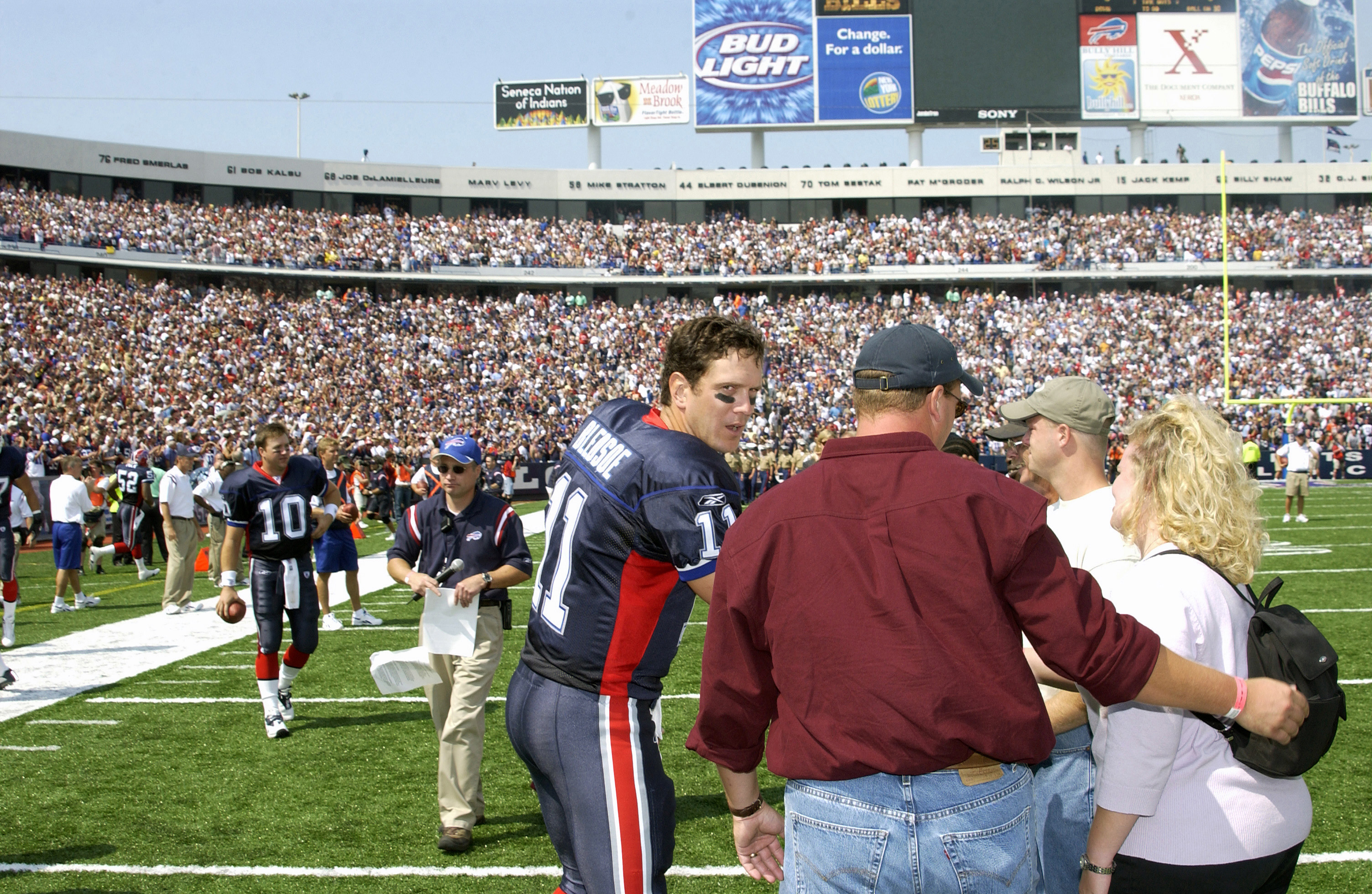
Quarterback Drew Bledsoe meets families of deceased soldiers, September 7, 2003

The 2003 Buffalo Bills season was their 44th in the league. The team failed to improve upon their previous season's output of 8–8, and finished at 6–10. The team missed the playoffs for the fourth consecutive season.

The Bills started the season strong, opening the season with a dominating 31–0 blowout of the New England Patriots. (Note: They would not win another game against the Patriots until 2011.) This was a revenge game for newly signed safety Lawyer Milloy, who had been cut by New England a few days earlier. It was their largest margin of victory in a season opener since 1992, and their first regular-season shutout in four years. The Bills' second game was a convincing three-touchdown win over the Jacksonville Jaguars. However, Buffalo lost seven of their next nine games, and finished the season with three consecutive losses. The Bills' final game of the season was a 31–0 shutout loss to the Patriots – the complete reverse of the score by which the Bills beat New England in Week One.

Head coach Gregg Williams' contract was not renewed after the 2003 season. (Note: Williams was replaced by Pittsburgh Steelers offensive coordinator Mike Mularkey in 2004.)

Van Miller, the team's longtime play-by-play announcer, announced his retirement after week 2 of the season; his retirement took effect at the end of the season.

== Offseason ==
=== Free agency ===
The Bills bolstered their defense by signing former Oakland Raiders defensive tackle Sam Adams, former Denver Broncos safety Izell Reese, former Houston Texans linebacker Jeff Posey and former Cincinnati Bengals linebacker Takeo Spikes during the offseason.

The Bills also traded for tight end Mark Campbell and signed kicker Rian Lindell during the offseason.

During the preseason, the Bills signed Lawyer Milloy after he was released by the New England Patriots.

| Additions | Subtractions |
|---|---|
| S Lawyer Milloy (Patriots) | CB Chris Watson (Lions) |
| LB Takeo Spikes (Bengals) | TE Jay Riemersma (Steelers) |
| K Rian Lindell (Seahawks) | WR Peerless Price (Falcons) |
| TE Mark Campbell (Browns) | C Bill Conaty (Patriots) |
| DT Sam Adams (Raiders) | WR Charlie Rogers (Dolphins) |
| S Izell Reese (Broncos) | K Mike Hollis (Giants) |
| LB Jeff Posey (Texans) | DE Chidi Ahanotu (49ers) |
| DE Keith McKenzie (Packers) | FB Larry Centers (Patriots) |
| WR Bobby Shaw (Jaguars) | |

=== NFL draft ===
The Bills traded away their first pick in the 2003 draft (#14 overall) to the New England Patriots for Drew Bledsoe in the previous draft. They obtained their first pick (#23 overall) from the Atlanta Falcons in exchange for Peerless Price.

2003 Buffalo Bills draft
| Round | Pick | Player | Position | College | Notes |
| 1 | 23 | Willis McGahee * | RB | Miami (FL) | Pick from ATL |
| 2 | 48 | Chris Kelsay | DE | Nebraska | |
| 3 | 94 | Angelo Crowell | LB | Virginia | |
| 4 | 111 | Terrence McGee * | CB | Northwestern State | |
| 4 | 127 | Sam Aiken | WR | North Carolina | |
| 5 | 151 | Ben Sobieski | OG | Iowa | |
| 6 | 187 | Lauvale Sape | DT | Utah | |
| 7 | 228 | Mario Haggan | LB | Mississippi State | |
Made roster † Pro Football Hall of Fame * Made at least one Pro Bowl during career

== Roster ==
2003 Buffalo Bills roster
| Quarterbacks (QB): 11 Drew Bledsoe; 5 Travis Brown; 10 Alex Van Pelt; Running backs (RB): 35 Joe Burns; 33 Sam Gash FB; 20 Travis Henry; 21 Willis McGahee; 31 Sammy Morris KR; 30 Ken Simonton; Wide receivers (WR): 86 Antonio Brown KR/PR; 85 Clarence Coleman; 80 Eric Moulds; 82 Josh Reed; 81 Bobby Shaw; Tight ends (TE): 84 Mark Campbell; 83 Dave Moore; 88 Ryan Neufeld | Offensive linemen (OL): 79 Ruben Brown G; 73 Marcus Price T; 61 Mike Pucillo G; 60 Bernard Robertson T; 64 Ben Sobieski T; 74 Marques Sullivan G/T; 70 Trey Teague C; 65 Ross Tucker G; 68 Mike Williams T; Defensive linemen (DL): 95 Sam Adams DT; 97 Justin Bannan DT; 92 Ryan Denney DE; 90 Chris Kelsay DE; 91 Keith McKenzie DE; 66 Lauvale Sape DT; 94 Aaron Schobel DE; 93 Pat Williams DT | Linebackers (LB): 55 Angelo Crowell OLB; 59 London Fletcher MLB; 53 Mario Haggan MLB; 52 DaShon Polk OLB; 96 Jeff Posey OLB; 51 Takeo Spikes OLB; 57 Josh Stamer OLB; 50 Dominique Stevenson MLB; Defensive backs (DB): 22 Nate Clements CB/PR; 24 Terrence McGee CB/KR; 36 Lawyer Milloy SS; 23 Pierson Prioleau FS; 37 Dainon Sidney CB; 28 Kevin Thomas CB; 26 Antoine Winfield CB; 27 Coy Wire FS; Special teams (ST): 54 Jon Dorenbos LS; 9 Rian Lindell K; 8 Brian Moorman P | Practice squad: 16 Cedric Bonner WR; 15 Jerel Myers WR; 71 David Porter T; 76 Richard Seals DT; 49 Rod Trafford TE; Reserve: 89 Sam Aiken WR (IR); -- Gary Byrd T (IR); 98 Ron Edwards DT (IR); 75 Jonas Jennings T (IR); 43 Izell Reese S (IR); Rookies in italics 53 active, 5 reserve, 5 practice squad |

== Regular season ==
=== Schedule ===
| Week | Date | Opponent | Result | Record | Venue | Attendance | Recap |
|---|---|---|---|---|---|---|---|
| 1 | September 7 | **New England Patriots** | **W** 31–0 | 1–0 | Ralph Wilson Stadium | 73,262 | Recap |
| 2 | September 14 | at Jacksonville Jaguars | **W** 38–17 | 2–0 | Alltel Stadium | 58,613 | Recap |
| 3 | September 21 | at **Miami Dolphins** | **L** 7–17 | 2–1 | Pro Player Stadium | 73,458 | Recap |
| 4 | September 28 | Philadelphia Eagles | **L** 13–23 | 2–2 | Ralph Wilson Stadium | 73,305 | Recap |
| 5 | October 5 | Cincinnati Bengals | **W** 22–16 (OT) | 3–2 | Ralph Wilson Stadium | 72,615 | Recap |
| 6 | October 12 | at **New York Jets** | **L** 3–30 | 3–3 | Giants Stadium | 77,740 | Recap |
| 7 | October 19 | Washington Redskins | **W** 24–7 | 4–3 | Ralph Wilson Stadium | 73,149 | Recap |
| 8 | October 26 | at Kansas City Chiefs | **L** 5–38 | 4–4 | Arrowhead Stadium | 78,689 | Recap |
| 9 | Bye | | | | | | |
| 10 | November 9 | at Dallas Cowboys | **L** 6–10 | 4–5 | Texas Stadium | 63,770 | Recap |
| 11 | November 16 | Houston Texans | **L** 10–12 | 4–6 | Ralph Wilson Stadium | 72,677 | Recap |
| 12 | November 23 | Indianapolis Colts | **L** 14–17 | 4–7 | Ralph Wilson Stadium | 73,004 | Recap |
| 13 | November 30 | at New York Giants | **W** 24–7 | 5–7 | Giants Stadium | 78,481 | Recap |
| 14 | December 7 | **New York Jets** | **W** 17–6 | 6–7 | Ralph Wilson Stadium | 72,791 | Recap |
| 15 | December 14 | at Tennessee Titans | **L** 26–28 | 6–8 | The Coliseum | 68,809 | Recap |
| 16 | December 21 | **Miami Dolphins** | **L** 3–20 | 6–9 | Ralph Wilson Stadium | 73,319 | Recap |
| 17 | December 27 | at **New England Patriots** | **L** 0–31 | 6–10 | Gillette Stadium | 68,436 | Recap |

Note: Intra-division opponents are in bold text.

=== Game summaries ===
==== Week 1: vs. New England Patriots ====
| Team | 1 | 2 | 3 | 4 | Total |
|---|---|---|---|---|---|
| Patriots | 0 | 0 | 0 | 0 | 0 |
| • **Bills** | 7 | 14 | 0 | 10 | 31 |

- Date: September 7
- Location: Ralph Wilson Stadium, Orchard Park, New York
- Game start: 1:04 p.m. EST
- Elapsed time: 3:13
- Game attendance: 73,262
- Game weather: 64 °F (17.8 °C), wind 11 mph (18 km/h; 9.6 kn)
- Referee: Jeff Triplette
- TV announcers (CBS): Verne Lundquist, Dan Dierdorf, and Bonnie Bernstein
- Source: Pro-Football-Reference.com

Scoring summary
| 1 | Bills | Travis Henry 1 yard run (Rian Lindell kick) | Bills 7–0 |
| 2 | Bills | Dave Moore 7 yard pass from Drew Bledsoe (Rian Lindell kick) | Bills 14–0 |
| 2 | Bills | Sam Adams 37 yard interception return (Rian Lindell kick) | Bills 21–0 |
| 4 | Bills | Travis Henry 9 yard run (Rian Lindell kick) | Bills 28–0 |
| 4 | Bills | Rian Lindell 44 yard field goal | Bills 31–0 |

==== Week 2: at Jacksonville Jaguars ====
| Team | 1 | 2 | 3 | 4 | Total |
|---|---|---|---|---|---|
| • Bills | 14 | 7 | 14 | 3 | 38 |
| Jaguars | 0 | 7 | 3 | 7 | 17 |

- Date: September 14
- Location: Alltel Stadium
- Game start: 1:03 p.m. EST
- Elapsed time: 3:06
- Game attendance: 58,613
- Game weather: 86 °F or 30 °C; Humidity 62%; wind 6 mph (9.7 km/h; 5.2 kn) Heat Index 92 °F or 33.3 °C
- Referee: Terry McAulay
- TV announcers (CBS): Don Criqui, Steve Tasker

Scoring summary
| Q1 | 11:17 | BUF | Henry 1 yard run (Lindell kick) | BUF 7–0 |
| Q1 | 4:50 | BUF | Henry 6 yard run (Lindell kick) | BUF 14–0 |
| Q2 | 9:29 | JAX | Brunell 1 yard run (Marler kick) | BUF 14–7 |
| Q2 | 1:37 | BUF | Shaw 54 yard pass from Bledsoe (Lindell kick) | BUF 21–7 |
| Q3 | 12:54 | JAX | Marler 44 yard field goal | BUF 21–10 |
| Q3 | 8:03 | BUF | Moulds 36 yard pass from Bledsoe (Lindell kick) | BUF 28–10 |
| Q3 | 0:59 | BUF | Henry 4 yard run (Lindell kick) | BUF 35–10 |
| Q4 | 5:11 | BUF | Lindell 27 yard field goal | BUF 38–10 |
| Q4 | 1:53 | JAX | Wrighster 5 yard pass from Leftwich (Marler kick) | BUF 38–17 |

- Drew Bledsoe 19/25, 314 yds, 2 TD
- Eric Moulds 7 Rec, 133 yds, 1 TD

== Standings ==
AFC East
| | W | L | T | PCT | DIV | CONF | PF | PA | STK |
|---|---|---|---|---|---|---|---|---|---|
| ^{(1)} New England Patriots | 14 | 2 | 0 | .875 | 5–1 | 11–1 | 348 | 238 | W12 |
| Miami Dolphins | 10 | 6 | 0 | .625 | 4–2 | 7–5 | 311 | 261 | W2 |
| Buffalo Bills | 6 | 10 | 0 | .375 | 2–4 | 4–8 | 243 | 279 | L3 |
| New York Jets | 6 | 10 | 0 | .375 | 1–5 | 6–6 | 283 | 299 | L2 |
