= 2003 New York Jets season =

2003 season of NFL team New York Jets

- Owner: Woody & Christopher Johnson
- Head coach: Herman Edwards
- Home stadium: Giants Stadium

Results
- Record: 6–10
- Division place: 4th AFC East
- Playoffs: Did not qualify
- Pro Bowlers: C Kevin Mawae; DE Shaun Ellis

Uniform
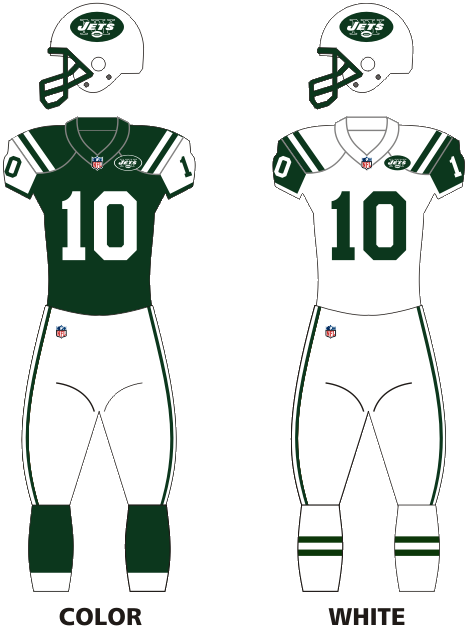

The 2003 New York Jets season was the franchise's 34th season in the National Football League (NFL), the 44th season overall, and the third under head coach Herman Edwards. The team tried to improve upon its 9–7 record from 2002 and defend its AFC East title, but the Jets failed to do so and finished with a record of 6–10. The Jets finished with a losing record for the first time since their 1–15 campaign in 1996 and missed the playoffs for the first time since 2000.

== Offseason ==
Additions	Subtractions
P Dan Stryzinski (Chiefs)	P Matt Turk (Dolphins)
K Doug Brien (Vikings)	WR Laveranues Coles (Redskins)
WR Kevin Lockett (Jaguars)	FB Richie Anderson (Cowboys)
	G Randy Thomas (Redskins)
	K John Hall (Redskins)
	S Nick Ferguson (Broncos)

=== NFL draft ===
2003 New York Jets draft
Round	Pick	Player	Position	College	Notes
1	4	Dewayne Robertson	DT	Kentucky	from Chicago
2	53	Victor Hobson	LB	Michigan	
3	85	B. J. Askew	FB	Michigan	
5	140	Derek Pagel	S	Iowa	from Dallas via New England and Washington
5	150	Matt Walters	DE	Miami (FL)	from Kansas City
6	200	Brooks Bollinger	QB	Wisconsin	from Pittsburgh via Kansas City
7	237	Dave Yovanovits	G	Temple	
Made roster

== Staff ==
2003 New York Jets staff
Front office: Owner – Woody Johnson; Manager of football administration – Dawn Aponte; Head coaches: Head coach – Herman Edwards; Offensive coaches: Offensive coordinator – Paul Hackett; Quarterbacks/wide receivers – Jim Hostler; Running backs – Bishop Harris; Offensive line – Doug Marrone; Senior offensive assistant – Jimmy Raye; Offensive assistant – Tim Berbenich; Offensive quality control – Pep Hamilton	Defensive coaches: Defensive coordinator – Ted Cottrell; Linebackers – Bob Sutton; Defensive backs – Bill Bradley; Defensive assistant/linebackers – Dave Merritt; Special teams coaches: Special teams coordinator – Mike Westhoff; Strength and conditioning: Strength and conditioning – John Lott; Strength assistant – Sal Alosi

== Roster ==
2003 New York Jets roster
Quarterbacks (QB): 5 Brooks Bollinger; 10 Chad Pennington; 16 Vinny Testaverde; Running backs (RB): 35 B. J. Askew FB; 34 LaMont Jordan; 28 Curtis Martin; 33 Jerald Sowell FB; Wide receivers (WR): 81 Curtis Conway; 87 Lawrence Hamilton; 89 Kevin Lockett; 83 Santana Moss; 17 Ken-Yon Rambo; 82 Kevin Swayne; Tight ends (TE): 86 Chris Baker; 88 Anthony Becht	Offensive linemen (OL): 69 Jason Fabini T; 78 Jonathan Goodwin G; 63 J. P. Machado C; 68 Kevin Mawae C; 67 Kareem McKenzie T; 65 Brandon Moore G; 70 Lance Nimmo T; 74 Brent Smith G; 79 Dave Szott G; 64 Dave Yovanovits G; Defensive linemen (DL): 92 Shaun Ellis DE; 91 Josh Evans DT; 72 Jason Ferguson DT; 98 Alan Harper DT; 75 Chester McGlockton DT; 93 James Reed DT; 63 Dewayne Robertson DT; 99 Bryan Thomas DE; 95 Matt Walters DE	Linebackers (LB): 50 Mark Brown OLB; 56 Sam Cowart OLB; 58 Jason Glenn OLB; 54 Victor Hobson OLB; 55 Marvin Jones MLB; 57 Mo Lewis OLB; 51 Quincy Stewart OLB; 52 Kenyatta Wright MLB; Defensive backs (DB): 29 Donnie Abraham CB; 21 Aaron Beasley CB; 22 Tyrone Carter FS; 42 Sam Garnes SS; 23 Jamie Henderson CB; 26 Omare Lowe CB; 24 Ray Mickens CB; 25 Derek Pagel FS; Special teams (ST): 6 Doug Brien K; 85 James Dearth LS; 4 Dan Stryzinski P	Practice squad: 8 Mark Mariscal P; 14 Cecil Moore WR; 73 Will Ofenheusle T; 36 Jonathan Reese RB; 18 Rob Turner WR; Reserve: 94 John Abraham DE (IR); 84 Jonathan Carter WR/KR (IR); 80 Wayne Chrebet WR (IR); 38 Jon McGraw S (IR); Rookies in italics 53 active, 4 reserve, 5 practice squad

== Preseason ==
Week	Date	Opponent	Result	Record	Venue	Recap
AB	August 2	vs. Tampa Bay Buccaneers	L 14–30	0–1	(Japan) Tokyo Dome (Tokyo)	Recap
1	August 10	Cincinnati Bengals	W 28–13	1–1	Giants Stadium	Recap
2	August 16	New Orleans Saints	L 17–22	1–2	Giants Stadium	Recap
3	August 23	at New York Giants	W 15–14	2–2	Giants Stadium	Recap
4	August 28	at Philadelphia Eagles	W 17–9	3–2	Lincoln Financial Field	Recap

== Regular season ==
During the 2003 regular season the Jets’ non-divisional, conference opponents were primarily from the AFC South, although they also played the Pittsburgh Steelers from the AFC North, and the Oakland Raiders from the AFC West. Their non-conference opponents were from the NFC East.

=== Schedule ===
Week	Date	Opponent	Result	Record	Venue	Recap
1	September 4	at Washington Redskins	**L** 13–16	0–1	FedExField	Recap
2	September 14	**Miami Dolphins**	**L** 10–21	0–2	Giants Stadium	Recap
3	September 21	at **New England Patriots**	**L** 16–23	0–3	Gillette Stadium	Recap
4	September 28	Dallas Cowboys	**L** 6–17	0–4	Giants Stadium	Recap
5	Bye					
6	October 12	**Buffalo Bills**	**W** 30–3	1–4	Giants Stadium	Recap
7	October 19	at Houston Texans	**W** 19–14	2–4	Reliant Stadium	Recap
8	October 26	at Philadelphia Eagles	**L** 17–24	2–5	Lincoln Financial Field	Recap
9	November 2	New York Giants	**L** 28–31 (OT)	2–6	Giants Stadium	Recap
10	November 9	at Oakland Raiders	**W** 27–24 (OT)	3–6	Network Associates Coliseum	Recap
11	November 16	at Indianapolis Colts	**L** 31–38	3–7	RCA Dome	Recap
12	November 23	Jacksonville Jaguars	**W** 13–10	4–7	Giants Stadium	Recap
13	December 1	Tennessee Titans	**W** 24–17	5–7	Giants Stadium	Recap
14	December 7	at **Buffalo Bills**	**L** 6–17	5–8	Ralph Wilson Stadium	Recap
15	December 14	Pittsburgh Steelers	**W** 6–0	6–8	Giants Stadium	Recap
16	December 20	**New England Patriots**	**L** 16–21	6–9	Giants Stadium	Recap
17	December 28	at **Miami Dolphins**	**L** 21–23	6–10	Pro Player Stadium	Recap

Note: Intra-division opponents are in bold text.

=== Standings ===
AFC East
	W	L	T	PCT	DIV	CONF	PF	PA	STK
^{(1)} New England Patriots	14	2	0	.875	5–1	11–1	348	238	W12
Miami Dolphins	10	6	0	.625	4–2	7–5	311	261	W2
Buffalo Bills	6	10	0	.375	2–4	4–8	243	279	L3
New York Jets	6	10	0	.375	1–5	6–6	283	299	L2
