= Kenyatta Wright =

American football player (born 1978)

No. 98
- Position: Linebacker

Personal information
- Born: February 19, 1978 (age 48); Vian, Oklahoma, U.S.
- Listed height: 6 ft 0 in (1.83 m)
- Listed weight: 238 lb (108 kg)

Career information
- College: Oklahoma State
- NFL draft: 2000: undrafted

Career history
- Buffalo Bills (2000–2001); New York Jets (2003–2005)

Awards and highlights
- 2× Second-team All-Big 12 (1997, 1998)

Career NFL statistics
- Tackles: 115
- Sacks: 1.5
- Fumble recoveries: 2
- Stats at Pro Football Reference

Kenyatta Terrell Wright (born February 19, 1978) is an American former professional football player who was a linebacker for the New York Jets of the National Football League (NFL) from 2003 to 2005. He was a four-year starter playing college football for the Oklahoma State Cowboys, recording 260 career tackles, 11 sacks, and one fumble recovery. He was signed as a free agent in 2000 by the Buffalo Bills.

== Professional career ==
As an undrafted free agent out of Oklahoma State University, he first signed with the Buffalo Bills and played for two years under defensive co-ordinator Ted Cottrell. In 2003 Ted Cottrell joined the New York Jets as defensive co-ordinator and brought Kenyatta with him, who would go onto spend 3 of his 5 seasons in Green and White. He played a key role in the Jets special teams under Mike Westhoff on route to a 10–6 record and playoff berth in 2004.

Kenyatta Wright retired in 2006.

== NFL career statistics ==
Legend
**Bold**	Career high

=== Regular season ===
Year	Team	Games		Tackles					Interceptions					Fumbles			
Year	Team	GP	GS	Cmb	Solo	Ast	Sck	TFL	Int	Yds	TD	Lng	PD	FF	FR	Yds	TD
2000	BUF	**16**	**1**	31	**28**	3	0.0	0	0	0	0	0	0	0	0	0	0
2001	BUF	11	**1**	**36**	**28**	**8**	**1.5**	**1**	0	0	0	0	**1**	**1**	**1**	0	0
2003	NYJ	**16**	0	22	18	4	0.0	0	0	0	0	0	0	0	0	0	0
2004	NYJ	**16**	0	13	8	5	0.0	0	0	0	0	0	0	0	**1**	0	0
2005	NYJ	15	0	13	10	3	0.0	0	0	0	0	0	0	0	0	0	0
		74	2	115	92	23	1.5	1	0	0	0	0	1	1	2	0	0

=== Playoffs ===
Year	Team	Games		Tackles					Interceptions					Fumbles			
Year	Team	GP	GS	Cmb	Solo	Ast	Sck	TFL	Int	Yds	TD	Lng	PD	FF	FR	Yds	TD
2004	NYJ	**2**	0	**3**	**3**	0	0.0	0	0	0	0	0	0	0	0	0	0
		2	0	3	3	0	0.0	0	0	0	0	0	0	0	0	0	0

== Personal life ==
Wright is married with two sons who both play college football, Elijah is a linebacker at The University of Central Oklahoma and Solomon is a defensive tackle on the roster at Oklahoma State University.
