= Sam Cowart =

American football player (born 1975)

No. 55, 56
- Position: Linebacker

Personal information
- Born: February 26, 1975 (age 51); Jacksonville, Florida, U.S.
- Listed height: 6 ft 2 in (1.88 m)
- Listed weight: 245 lb (111 kg)

Career information
- High school: Mandarin (Jacksonville)
- College: Florida State
- NFL draft: 1998: 2nd round, 39th overall pick

Career history
- Buffalo Bills (1998–2001); New York Jets (2002–2004); Minnesota Vikings (2005); Houston Texans (2006)*
- * Offseason or practice squad member only

Awards and highlights
- Second team All-Pro (2000); Pro Bowl (2000); PFWA All-Rookie Team (1998); Bowl Coalition National Championship (1993); Consensus All-American (1997); First-team All-ACC (1997); ACC Brian Piccolo Award (1997)

Career NFL statistics
- Games played: 100
- Games started: 87
- Tackles: 715
- Quarterback sacks: 12.5
- Interceptions: 4
- Stats at Pro Football Reference

Samuel Cowart III (born February 26, 1975) is an American former professional football player who was a linebacker for eight seasons in the National Football League (NFL). He played college football for the Florida State Seminoles, earning consensus All-American honors. A second-round pick in the 1998 NFL draft, he played professionally for the Buffalo Bills, New York Jets, and Minnesota Vikings of the NFL. Cowart was a Pro Bowl selection in 2000.

== Early life ==
Cowart was born in Jacksonville, Florida. He attended Mandarin High School in Jacksonville, and played for the Mandarin Mustangs high school football team. As a senior football player, he was a Super Prep high school All-American selection and a USA Today All-America honorable mention, named the Jacksonville Defensive Player of the Year, and won first-team all-state honors, and helped lead the Mustangs to the district championship in the state playoffs.

== College career ==
Cowart attended Florida State University, where he played for coach Bobby Bowden's Florida State Seminoles football team from 1993 through 1997. He was a reserve linebacker on the Seminoles' 1993 national championship team. In 1995, he led FSU in tackles in with 115 (76 solo), finishing sixth in the Atlantic Coast Conference (ACC) in that category. The same year, Cowart had three quarterback sacks and 13 tackles in the FSU-Florida game (at Florida) to earn ABC player of the game honors. Returning in 1997 after a knee injury that kept him out of the 1996 season, Cowart earned consensus first-team All-American recognition, leading the team with 116 tackles. He also set an FSU team record with three fumbles returned or recovered for touchdowns. He was a finalist for the Butkus Award and Bronko Nagurski Trophy and winner of the ACC's Brian Piccolo Award for the conference's "Most Courageous Player."

== Professional career ==
Pre-draft measurables
Height	Weight	Arm length	Hand span	20-yard shuttle	Vertical jump
6 ft 0 7/8 in (1.85 m)	246 lb (112 kg)	33 in (0.84 m)	9 1/8 in (0.23 m)	4.28 s	30.5 in (0.77 m)
All values from NFL Combine

=== Buffalo Bills ===
Cowart was drafted 39th overall by the Buffalo Bills in the second round of the 1998 NFL draft. He played for the Bills for four seasons and received a trip to the Pro Bowl in the 2000 season.

Before he was cut down by injuries, Cowart, was a sideline-to-sideline force on a playmaking par with Baltimore Ravens linebacker Ray Lewis. Cowart was the Pro Bowl heart of Buffalo's defense until he was chopped down by Frank Middleton, a Tampa Bay Buccaneers guard, resulting in a severe ankle injury that ended his 2000 season after 12 games. Cowart also suffered a season-ending Achilles' tendon tear in Buffalo's 2001 season opener.

"He and Ray Lewis were the best linebackers in the league before Sam suffered that Achilles' injury," said Ted Cottrell, Cowart's defensive coordinator for the Bills from 1998 to 2000.

=== New York Jets ===
After the 2001 year, Cowart went to the New York Jets. He played as a starting linebacker for them in one of thirty-one games of the first two seasons. His third season he played nine games and only started two.

=== Minnesota Vikings ===
Cowart was indirectly involved in the Minnesota/Oakland trade that sent Randy Moss to the Oakland Raiders in exchange for linebacker Napoleon Harris, a 1st round pick (7th overall) and a 7th round pick. Cowart was then traded by the New York Jets, to the Minnesota Vikings in exchange for the 7th round pick that was received from Oakland. He only played one season for the Vikings starting fourteen of fifteen games he played in.

=== Houston Texans ===
After the 2005 season the Vikings released Cowart. Cowart signed with the Houston Texans to become their starting middle linebacker until he was injured and was to miss the whole season. While injured, rookie DeMeco Ryans took over the middle linebacker duties and was so impressive that he was named NFL Defensive Rookie of the Year. After the Texans made Ryans their full-time starter they felt that they did not need Cowart any more so he was released after the 2006 season.

== NFL statistics ==
=== Regular season ===
Year	Team	GP	GS	Tackles				Fumbles		Interceptions					
Year	Team	GP	GS	Comb	Solo	Ast	Sack	FF	FR	Int	Yds	Avg	Lng	TD	PD
1998	BUF	16	11	79	61	18	0.0	2	0	2	23	11.5	23	0	3
1999	BUF	16	16	124	79	45	1.0	1	1	0	0	0.0	0	0	2
2000	BUF	12	12	130	88	42	5.5	1	2	2	4	2.0	2	0	6
2001	BUF	1	1	2	0	2	0.0	0	0	0	0	0.0	0	0	0
2002	NYJ	16	16	127	91	36	2.0	0	0	0	0	0.0	0	0	8
2003	NYJ	15	15	140	96	44	2.0	1	1	0	0	0.0	0	0	2
2004	NYJ	9	2	26	21	5	0.0	1	0	0	0	0.0	0	0	0
2005	MIN	15	14	84	71	13	2.0	0	0	0	0	0.0	0	0	2
Career		100	87	712	507	205	12.5	6	4	4	27	6.8	23	0	23

=== Postseason ===
Year	Team	GP	GS	Tackles				Fumbles		Interceptions					
Year	Team	GP	GS	Comb	Solo	Ast	Sack	FF	FR	Int	Yds	Avg	Lng	TD	PD
1998	BUF	1	1	3	1	2	0.0	0	0	0	0	0.0	0	0	0
1999	BUF	1	1	11	6	5	0.0	0	0	0	0	0.0	0	0	1
2002	NYJ	2	2	6	5	1	0.0	0	0	0	0	0.0	0	0	0
2004	NYJ	1	0	2	1	1	0.0	0	0	0	0	0.0	0	0	0
Career		5	4	22	13	9	0.0	0	0	0	0	0.0	0	0	1

== Post NFL career ==
Cowart now lives in the Jacksonville, FL area and works at the financial firm Northwestern Mutual.
