= 2003 Miami Dolphins season =

38th season in franchise history

- Owner: Wayne Huizenga
- Head coach: Dave Wannstedt
- Home stadium: Pro Player Stadium

Results
- Record: 10–6
- Division place: 2nd AFC East
- Playoffs: Did not qualify
- Pro Bowlers: DE Adewale Ogunleye; LB Zach Thomas; CB Patrick Surtain; S Brock Marion

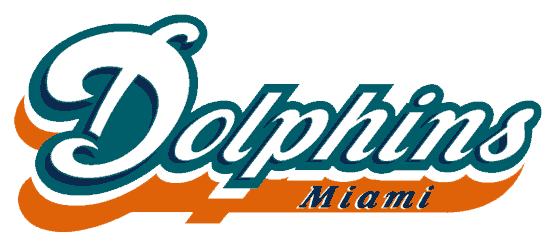

The 2003 Miami Dolphins season was the franchise's 34th season in the National Football League, the 38th overall and third under head coach Dave Wannstedt. The Dolphins improved upon their previous season's output of 9–7 by winning 10 games. This marked the seventh consecutive winning season for the team and fifteenth straight with a record of .500 or better, but for the second straight year they failed to clinch a playoff berth.

== Offseason ==
=== NFL draft ===
2003 Miami Dolphins draft
Round	Pick	Player	Position	College	Notes
2	49	Eddie Moore	Linebacker	Texas A&M	
3	78	Wade Smith *	Tackle	Memphis	
3	87	Taylor Whitley	Guard	Texas A&M	
5	156	Donald Lee	Tight end	Mississippi State	
5	169	J. R. Tolver	Wide receiver	San Diego State	
6	181	Corey Jenkins	Linebacker	South Carolina	
6	209	Tim Provost	Tackle	San Jose State	
6	213	Yeremiah Bell *	Safety	Eastern Kentucky	
7	248	Davern Williams	Defensive tackle	Troy State	
Made roster † Pro Football Hall of Fame * Made at least one Pro Bowl during career

== Staff ==
2003 Miami Dolphins staff
Front office: Owner/chairman of the board – Wayne Huizenga; President – Eddie Jones; Executive vice president/chief operating officer – Bryan Wiedmeier; Senior vice president of football operations/player personnel – Rick Spielman; Head coaches: Head coach – Dave Wannstedt; Assistant head coach/offensive coordinator – Norv Turner; Offensive coaches: Running backs – Joel Collier; Wide receivers – Robert Ford; Tight ends – Pat Jones; Offensive line – Tony Wise; Offensive quality control/quarterbacks – Judd Garrett	Defensive coaches: Defensive coordinator – Jim Bates; Defensive line – Clarence Brooks; Assistant defensive line – Glenn Pires; Linebackers – Bob Sanders; Secondary – Mel Phillips; Defensive nickel package – Bill Lewis; Special teams coaches: Special teams – Keith Armstrong; Assistant special teams/offensive assistant – Bernie Parmalee; Strength and conditioning: Strength and conditioning – John Gamble; Assistant strength and conditioning – Brad Roll

== Roster ==
2003 Miami Dolphins roster
Quarterbacks (QB): 9 Jay Fiedler; 14 Brian Griese; 18 Sage Rosenfels; Running backs (RB): 30 Obafemi Ayanbadejo; 26 Leonard Henry; 44 Rob Konrad FB; 28 Travis Minor KR; 32 Charlie Rogers KR/PR; 34 Ricky Williams; Wide receivers (WR): 84 Chris Chambers; 80 James McKnight; 82 Kendall Newson; 88 Derrius Thompson; 86 Oronde Gadsden; Tight ends (TE): 85 Donald Lee; 81 Randy McMichael	Offensive linemen (OL): 70 Brad Bedell T; 60 Greg Jerman G/T; 68 Seth McKinney C/G; 66 Jamie Nails G; 75 Todd Perry G; 61 Tim Ruddy C; 74 Wade Smith T; 71 Todd Wade T; 69 Taylor Whitley G; 73 Billy Yates G; Defensive linemen (DL): 96 David Bowens DE; 95 Tim Bowens DT; 97 Tony Brown DT; 64 Larry Chester DT; 98 Otis Grigsby DE; 93 Adewale Ogunleye DE; 94 Dario Romero DT; 99 Jason Taylor DE; 91 Jay Williams DE; 92 Jeff Zgonina DT	Linebackers (LB): 50 Brendon Ayanbadejo OLB; 52 Morlon Greenwood OLB; 51 Tommy Hendricks MLB/OLB; 57 Corey Jenkins OLB; 55 Junior Seau OLB; 54 Zach Thomas MLB; Defensive backs (DB): 27 Terrell Buckley CB; 20 Arturo Freeman SS; 24 Sammy Knight SS; 29 Sam Madison CB; 31 Brock Marion FS; 23 Patrick Surtain CB; 22 Shawn Wooden FS; 35 Jimmy Wyrick CB; Special teams (ST): 47 Jeff Grau LS; 10 Olindo Mare K; 1 Matt Turk P	Practice squad: 46 Yeremiah Bell S (IR); 15 Ronald Bellamy WR; 65 Shawn Lynch C; 17 Carl Morris WR; 45 Alphonso Roundtree CB; 49 Josh Whitman TE; Reserve: 77 Jarvis Borum T (IR); 90 Rob Burnett DE (IR); 63 Mark Dixon G/T (IR); 21 Jamar Fletcher CB (IR); 42 Trent Gamble CB/S (IR); 58 Eddie Moore LB (IR); 89 Ed Perry LS (IR); 83 Sam Simmons WR/PR (IR); 87 J. R. Tolver WR (IR); 75 Davern Williams DT (IR); Rookies in italics 53 active, 11 reserve, 5 practice squad

== Schedule ==
=== Preseason ===
Week	Date	Opponent	Result	Record	Venue	Recap
1	August 8	Tampa Bay Buccaneers	L 19–20	0–1	Pro Player Stadium	Recap
2	August 15	at Jacksonville Jaguars	L 23–27	0–2	Alltel Stadium	Recap
3	August 22	Atlanta Falcons	W 21–31	1–2	Pro Player Stadium	Recap
4	August 28	at New Orleans Saints	W 17–22	2–2	Louisiana Superdome	Recap

=== Regular season ===
Week	Date	Opponent	Result	Record	Venue	Attendance
1	September 7	Houston Texans	L 20–21	0–1	Pro Player Stadium	73,010
2	September 14	at New York Jets	W 21–10	1–1	Giants Stadium	77,461
3	September 21	Buffalo Bills	W 17–7	2–1	Pro Player Stadium	73,458
4	Bye					
5	October 5	at New York Giants	W 23–10	3–1	Giants Stadium	78,863
6	October 12	at Jacksonville Jaguars	W 24–10	4–1	Alltel Stadium	66,437
7	October 19	New England Patriots	L 13–19 (OT)	4–2	Pro Player Stadium	73,650
8	October 27	at San Diego Chargers	W 26–10	5–2	Sun Devil Stadium (Note: Due to the wildfires in the San Diego area, the Dolphins' Week 8 game at the San Diego Chargers was relocated to Sun Devil Stadium in Tempe.)	73,014
9	November 2	Indianapolis Colts	L 17–23	5–3	Pro Player Stadium	73,258
10	November 9	at Tennessee Titans	L 7–31	5–4	The Coliseum	68,809
11	November 16	Baltimore Ravens	W 9–6 (OT)	6–4	Pro Player Stadium	73,333
12	November 23	Washington Redskins	W 24–23	7–4	Pro Player Stadium	73,578
13	November 27	at Dallas Cowboys	W 40–21	8–4	Texas Stadium	64,110
14	December 7	at New England Patriots	L 0–12	8–5	Gillette Stadium	68,436
15	December 15	Philadelphia Eagles	L 27–34	8–6	Pro Player Stadium	73,780
16	December 21	at Buffalo Bills	W 20–3	9–6	Ralph Wilson Stadium	73,319
17	December 28	New York Jets	W 23–21	10–6	Pro Player Stadium	73,720

== Game summaries ==
=== Week 1 vs. Houston Texans ===
The Dolphins season got off to a rough start in their first ever meeting with the second-year Houston Texans. The Dolphins behind three Jay Fiedler touchdowns led 20-15 in the fourth, but two field goals (the first off a Fiedler interception) put the Texans up 21-20 with thirty seconds to go. Fielder was then intercepted again, ending the game in a 21-20 Miami loss, the Dolphins' first loss to a Houston NFL team since losing to the Oilers in 1991.

=== Week 2 at New York Jets ===
Team	1	2	3	4	Total
• Dolphins	7	14	0	0	21
Jets	3	0	0	7	10

- Date: September 14
- Location: Giants Stadium, East Rutherford, New Jersey
- Game start: 1:00 p.m. EST
- Game attendance: 77,461
- Game weather: 73 °F (23 °C); wind 13 mph (21 km/h)
- Referee: Johnny Grier
- TV announcers (CBS): Dick Enberg, Dan Dierdorf, Bonnie Bernstein

Scoring summary
Q1	NYJ	Doug Brien 30 yard field goal	NYJ 3–0
Q1	MIA	Jay Fiedler 9 yard run (Olindo Mare kick)	MIA 7–3
Q2	MIA	Randy McMichael 8 yard pass from Jay Fiedler (Olindo Mare kick)	MIA 14–3
Q2	MIA	Ricky Williams 2 yard run (Olindo Mare kick)	MIA 21–3
Q4	NYJ	Santana Moss 32 yard pass from Vinny Testaverde (Doug Brien kick)	MIA 21–10

Ricky Williams erupted to 125 rushing yards and a touchdown as Fiedler and Travis Minor added 62 more yards on the ground in Miami's first win of the season. The Dolphins held Curtis Martin to 32 yards total.

=== Week 3 vs. Buffalo Bills ===
After being swept the year before the Dolphins embarrassed the Bills, limiting them to 139 yards of offense and intercepting Drew Bledsoe three times. Ricky Williams exploded to 154 rushing yards and a touchdown in the 17-7 Miami win.

=== Week 5 at New York Giants ===
The Dolphins continued surging 23-10 despite being outgained 350 yards to 275. Miami intercepted Kerry Collins three times and rushed for 134 yards - 68 of them on James McKnight's 68-yard rushing touchdown. Ricky Williams scored a touchdown on 1 yard run to ice the game. The Dolphins beat the Giants for the first time since their perfect season.

=== Week 6 at Jacksonville Jaguars ===
The Dolphins returned to Jacksonville for the first time since the 2000 AFC divisional playoffs being blown out 62-7 to put up just 234 total yards, were penalized for 149 total yards, yet picked off Byron Leftwich three times and snatched two Jaguars fumbles en route to winning 24-10. Randy McMichael scored when he scooped up a fumble by teammate Obafemi Ayanbadejo from the Jaguars 2-yard line.

=== Week 7 vs. New England Patriots ===
The Dolphins and Patriots were battling for first in the AFC East and the Dolphins forced two fumbles - one by Tom Brady on a quarterback sneak - and led 13-6 before Brady whipped a 24-yard touchdown to a leaping David Givens. The Dolphins drove to the New England 17 before the two-minute warning; when Ricky Williams appeared to be downed short of a first down the Patriots challenged the spot but the call stood. Olindo Mare's 35-yard kick following the two-minute warning was blocked, but the Dolphins smothered the Patriots final drive (the key play came when former Patriot Terrell Buckley blew up a Kevin Faulk run for a four-yard loss). The game went to overtime and controversy ensued on the coin toss as the Patriots called tails but referee Gerald Austin, using a silver dollar that came up Lady Columbia (heads on a silver dollar) called it heads. On the Dolphins ensuing drive Fiedler completed a 31-yard bomb to the left sideline to Derrius Thompson; four Ricky Williams runs for 26 yards put the ball back on the 17, the dirt portion of the field with Pro Player Stadium hosting the 2003 World Series involving the Florida Marlins. Mare's kick missed, but the Patriots had to punt; on the next Miami drive Fiedler escaped a sack and heaved a bomb that was intercepted by Tyrone Poole at the New England 18. From there Brady finished off the game on an 82-yard touchdown to Troy Brown.

=== Week 8 at San Diego Chargers ===
Wildfires in California forced the Chargers to move their Monday Night game with Miami to the Cardinals' home stadium. With Brian Griese replacing Jay Fiedler at quarterback the Dolphins jumped on the struggling Chargers, scoring 24 points in the first half while sacking Drew Brees six times (once for a safety in the fourth quarter) and intercepting him three times. The Dolphins won 26-10 as the two teams combined for just 514 yards of offense.

=== Week 9 vs. Indianapolis Colts ===
Former AFC East rival Indianapolis made its first trip to Miami since 2001. Following a Ricky Williams touchdown the Colts scored 16 points. An exchange of touchdown throws and a Marvin Harrison fumble were followed by a late Olindo Mare field goal with the score 23-17 Colts. Terrell Buckley of the Dolphins picked off Peyton Manning with 2:50 to go, but at 2:17 Griese was strip-sacked by Dwight Freeney and the game ended in the 23-17 Indianapolis win.

=== Week 10 at Tennessee Titans ===
The Titans annihilated the Dolphins 31-7 (the Titans franchise's first win over the Dolphins since their 1991 season as the Houston Oilers) by scoring the first 31 points. Steve McNair threw for 201 yards and two touchdowns while Griese was intercepted three times. McNair and three Titans backs rushed for 101 yards while McNair and Billy Volek's combined passing yards (223) almost outdid Miami's entire yardage on offense (224).

=== Week 11 vs. Baltimore Ravens ===
The two teams combined for 490 yards of offense as Anthony Wright made his debut with the Ravens. Wright was intercepted twice as the game saw just four combined field goals and went into overtime tied 6-6. In overtime Wright fumbled to Zach Thomas and from there the Dolphins drove down for the winning Mare field goal, 9-6 final.

=== Week 12 vs. Washington Redskins ===
Despite an 80-yard touchdown from Brian Griese to James McKnight, the Dolphins fell behind 20-7 late in the second quarter. Following a third-quarter interception Griese was benched for Jay Fiedler with the Dolphins down 23-10, and Fiedler led two touchdown drives ending in Ricky Williams touchdowns. Brock Marion intercepted Tim Hasselbeck but the Dolphins had to punt; the Redskins botched the catch and James McKnight recovered the fumble, securing the 24-23 Dolphins win.

=== Thanksgiving Day at Dallas Cowboys ===
For the third time in ten years the Cowboys, surging under first-year coach Bill Parcells, hosted the Dolphins on Thanksgiving, ten years after the infamous Leon Lett game and four years after a shutout win over Miami 20-0. The Dolphins this time made sure of the outcome; they sacked Quincy Carter five times and intercepted him three times, leading 37-14 halfway through the third quarter and winning 40-21.

=== Week 14 at New England Patriots ===
All hope for the division title was buried amid a heavy snowstorm at Gillette Stadium. Neither offense could move particularly well with an Adam Vinatieri field goal the only points until halfway through the fourth quarter. Backed up to his own goalline, Jay Fiedler was intercepted by Tedy Bruschi and Bruschi walked on his knees into the endzone; the touchdown caused fans to start throwing snow into the air in celebration. After a Ty Law interception and subsequent Patriots punt Fiedler was sacked in the endzone for a safety with 1:18 to go, ending a 12-0 Patriots win.

=== Monday Night Football vs. Philadelphia Eagles ===
The Dolphins returned to the warmth of Pro Player Stadium and wound up in a heated game against the surging Eagles. The two teams combined for 799 yards of offense, 317 of them on the ground with six touchdowns. The game lead tied or changed four times in the first half as Donovan McNabb ran in a touchdown and Freddie Mitchell unleashed a 25-yard score to Brian Westbrook. Jay Fiedler was picked off twice and also failed on a fourth-down attempt in the second quarter of the 34-27 Dolphins loss.

=== Week 16 at Buffalo Bills ===
With all playoff hopes gone, the Dolphins traveled to Ralph Wilson Stadium and defeated the Bills 20-3 in a game where the two teams combined for just over 400 yards of offense. Drew Bledsoe was benched after a 74-yard pick-six to Terrell Buckley and being sacked six times. Jay Fiedler threw only seventeen passes with only eight completions for 46 yards.

=== Week 17 vs. New York Jets ===
The season wrapped up against the 6-9 New York Jets and the resulting game turned into a tight contest. Jay Fiedler threw for 328 yards but the Jets rallied from down 20-7 by scoring fifteen points (six of them Doug Brien field goals while Dolphins punter and ex-Jet Matt Turk fumbled in the end zone for a safety and a two-point try after an Anthony Becht touchdown failed) that went unanswered until Fiedler completed three passes for 36 yards and Olindo Mare's 22-yard field goal with three seconds to go was good, ending a 23-21 Dolphins win.

== Standings ==
AFC East
	W	L	T	PCT	DIV	CONF	PF	PA	STK
^{(1)} New England Patriots	14	2	0	.875	5–1	11–1	348	238	W12
Miami Dolphins	10	6	0	.625	4–2	7–5	311	261	W2
Buffalo Bills	6	10	0	.375	2–4	4–8	243	279	L3
New York Jets	6	10	0	.375	1–5	6–6	283	299	L2
