= Sam Rogers (linebacker) =

American football player (born 1970)

No. 93, 59
- Position: Linebacker

Personal information
- Born: May 30, 1970 (age 56); Pontiac, Michigan, U.S.
- Listed height: 6 ft 3 in (1.91 m)
- Listed weight: 245 lb (111 kg)

Career information
- High school: St. Mary's Preparatory (Orchard Lake Village, Michigan)
- College: Colorado
- NFL draft: 1994: 2nd round, 64th overall pick

Career history
- Buffalo Bills (1994–2000); San Diego Chargers (2001); Atlanta Falcons (2002–2003)

Awards and highlights
- PFWA All-Rookie Team (1994); Second-team All-Big Eight (1993)

Career NFL statistics
- Tackles: 380
- Sacks: 30
- Interceptions: 2
- Stats at Pro Football Reference

Sammie Lee Rogers (born May 30, 1970) is an American former professional football player who was a linebacker in the National Football League (NFL) for the Buffalo Bills, San Diego Chargers, and Atlanta Falcons. He was selected by the Bills in the second round of the 1994 NFL draft after playing college football for the Colorado Buffaloes. His son, Armani, played college football at UNLV and Ohio before joining the Washington Commanders as an undrafted free agent in 2022.

== NFL career statistics ==
Legend
**Bold**	Career high

=== Regular season ===
Year	Team	Games		Tackles				Interceptions				Fumbles			
Year	Team	GP	GS	Comb	Solo	Ast	Sck	Int	Yds	TD	Lng	FF	FR	Yds	TD
1994	BUF	14	0	3	0	3	0.0	0	0	0	0	0	0	0	0
1995	BUF	16	8	45	32	13	2.0	0	0	0	0	1	1	0	0
1996	BUF	14	14	58	38	**20**	3.5	0	0	0	0	0	**2**	0	0
1997	BUF	15	15	53	39	14	3.5	0	0	0	0	1	0	0	0
1998	BUF	15	15	58	39	19	4.5	0	0	0	0	1	0	0	0
1999	BUF	16	16	**69**	**52**	17	3.0	**1**	**24**	0	**24**	0	**2**	7	0
2000	BUF	11	11	40	28	12	5.0	**1**	10	0	10	**3**	1	0	0
2001	SDG	15	0	9	8	1	1.0	0	0	0	0	0	0	0	0
2002	ATL	15	13	41	31	10	**6.5**	0	0	0	0	0	**2**	27	0
2003	ATL	2	2	4	4	0	1.0	0	0	0	0	1	1	**37**	0
		133	94	380	271	109	30.0	2	34	0	24	7	9	71	0

=== Playoffs ===
Year	Team	Games		Tackles				Interceptions				Fumbles			
Year	Team	GP	GS	Comb	Solo	Ast	Sck	Int	Yds	TD	Lng	FF	FR	Yds	TD
1995	BUF	2	2	4	**4**	0	0.0	0	0	0	0	0	0	0	0
1996	BUF	1	1	1	1	0	0.0	0	0	0	0	0	0	0	0
1998	BUF	1	1	**6**	**4**	**2**	0.0	0	0	0	0	0	0	0	0
1999	BUF	1	1	4	3	1	0.0	0	0	0	0	0	0	0	0
2002	ATL	2	2	5	**4**	1	0.0	0	0	0	0	0	0	0	0
		7	7	20	16	4	0.0	0	0	0	0	0	0	0	0
