= DaShon Polk =

American football player (born 1977)

No. 51
- Position: Linebacker

Personal information
- Born: March 13, 1977 (age 49); Pacoima, California, U.S.

Career information
- High school: William Howard Taft (Woodland Hills, California)
- College: Arizona
- NFL draft: 2000: 7th round, 251st overall pick

Career history
- Buffalo Bills (2000–2003); Houston Texans (2004–2006)

Awards and highlights
- Second-team All-Pac-10 (1998)

Career NFL statistics
- Tackles: 230
- Sacks: 4.5
- Forced fumbles: 1
- Stats at Pro Football Reference

DaShon Lamor Polk (born March 13, 1977) is an American former professional football player who was a linebacker in the National Football League (NFL) for the Buffalo Bills and Houston Texans. He played college football for the Arizona Wildcats.

== Early life ==
Polk was born in Pacoima, California and attended Taft High School where he was selected for All-City. Polk played college football at the University of Arizona and was a three-year starter.

== Professional career ==
Polk was selected by the Buffalo Bills in the seventh round (251st pick overall) in the 2000 NFL draft. He played for the Bills from 2000 to 2003, before playing for the Houston Texans from 2004 to 2006. Polk played seven seasons, accumulating 224 tackles, 4.5 sacks, and two forced fumbles, in the NFL before retiring. Now Dashon L. Polk has retired (2007). He has a wife of 17 years and 3 children, 2 living, 1 deceased.

== NFL career statistics ==
Legend
**Bold**	Career high

Year	Team	Games		Tackles					Interceptions					Fumbles			
Year	Team	GP	GS	Cmb	Solo	Ast	Sck	TFL	Int	Yds	TD	Lng	PD	FF	FR	Yds	TD
2000	BUF	5	0	4	3	1	0.0	0	0	0	0	0	0	0	0	0	0
2001	BUF	16	1	32	25	7	0.0	1	0	0	0	0	0	0	0	0	0
2002	BUF	16	0	31	19	12	0.0	0	0	0	0	0	0	0	0	0	0
2003	BUF	16	0	19	12	7	0.0	0	0	0	0	0	0	0	0	0	0
2004	HOU	16	4	37	25	12	1.0	1	0	0	0	0	0	0	**1**	0	0
2005	HOU	16	11	**94**	**64**	**30**	**3.5**	**3**	0	0	0	0	**1**	**1**	0	0	0
2006	HOU	10	0	13	8	5	0.0	0	0	0	0	0	0	0	0	0	0
Career		95	16	230	156	74	4.5	5	0	0	0	0	1	1	1	0	0
