= Jon Carman =

American football player (born 1976)

No. 76
- Position: Tackle

Personal information
- Born: January 14, 1976 (age 50); Herndon, Virginia, U.S.
- Listed height: 6 ft 7 in (2.01 m)
- Listed weight: 350 lb (159 kg)

Career information
- College: Georgia Tech
- NFL draft: 2000: undrafted

Career history
- Buffalo Bills (2000–2001)

Awards and highlights
- Third-team All-American (1999); First-team All-ACC (1999)

Career NFL statistics
- Games: 12
- Games started: 2
- Stats at Pro Football Reference

Jonathan Daniel Carman (born January 14, 1976) was an American professional football offensive lineman for the Buffalo Bills of the National Football League (NFL) 2000–2001. He played college football for Nassau Community College and Georgia Tech.
