= Robert Hicks (American football) =

American football player (born 1974)

No. 77
- Position: Offensive tackle

Personal information
- Born: November 17, 1974 (age 51); Atlanta, Georgia, U.S.
- Listed height: 6 ft 7 in (2.01 m)
- Listed weight: 338 lb (153 kg)

Career information
- High school: Douglass (Atlanta, Georgia)
- College: Mississippi State
- NFL draft: 1998: 3rd round, 68th overall pick

Career history
- Buffalo Bills (1998–2000); Detroit Lions (2001)*; Houston Texans (2001)*; Atlanta Falcons (2003)*; Oakland Raiders (2004–2005)*
- * Offseason or practice squad member only

Awards and highlights
- First-team All-SEC (1997)

Career NFL statistics
- Games played: 37
- Games started: 23
- Stats at Pro Football Reference

Robert Otis Hicks Jr. (born November 17, 1974) is an American former professional football player who was an offensive lineman in the National Football League (NFL) for the Buffalo Bills from 1998 until 2000. He played college football at Mississippi State University and was selected by Buffalo in the third round of the 1998 NFL draft.
