= John Butler (American football executive) =

American football executive (1946–2003)

Personal information
- Born: August 13, 1946; Chicago, Illinois, U.S.
- Died: April 11, 2003 (aged 56); San Diego, California, U.S.

Career information
- High school: Urbana (Urbana, Illinois)
- College: San Bernardino (1968–1969); University of Illinois (1970)

Career history

Coaching
- Evansville (1979–1981) Assistant coach; Chicago Blitz (1983–1984) Offensive line & tight ends coach

Operations
- Chicago Blitz (1983–1984) Scout & director of college scouting; San Diego Chargers (1985–1986) Scout; Buffalo Bills (1987–2000); Director of college scouting (1987–1988); Director of player personnel (1989–1992); General manager (1993–2000); San Diego Chargers (2001–2002) General manager
- Executive profile at Pro Football Reference

John Butler (August 13, 1946 – April 11, 2003) was a National Football League (NFL) general manager of the Buffalo Bills and the San Diego Chargers.

A native of Chicago, Butler spent four years in the Marines and saw active duty in Vietnam during the Vietnam War. After his discharge, he enrolled at San Bernardino Junior College, then went to the University of Illinois, where he played one season on the offensive line before a knee injury cut short his playing career.

Butler's first NFL job was as a scout for the Chargers in 1985. He joined the Bills in 1987 as the personnel director, then became the team's general manager in 1993. He was in Buffalo's front office for all of its record four straight trips to the NFL championship game from 1991 to 1994. The Bills lost all of those Super Bowls. During his tenure there, the Bills went to the playoffs 10 times and had a record of 140–83.

As Buffalo's personnel director, he was known for finding big talent at small colleges, such as wide receiver Don Beebe of Chadron State and defensive end Phil Hansen of North Dakota. He drafted Marcellus Wiley out of Columbia, then signed him as a free agent after he had taken over the Chargers in January 2001.

Butler built the foundation for San Diego's offense by drafting running back LaDainian Tomlinson and quarterback Drew Brees. San Diego went 5–11 and 8–8 in Butler's two seasons, improving from 1–15 the year before Butler's arrival.

Butler died of lymphoma on April 11, 2003. He was 56.
