= Raion Hill =

American football player (born 1976)

No. 39
- Position: Safety

Personal information
- Born: September 2, 1976 (age 50); Marrero, Louisiana, U.S.
- Listed height: 6 ft 0 in (1.83 m)
- Listed weight: 200 lb (91 kg)

Career information
- High school: Brother Martin (New Orleans, Louisiana)
- College: LSU
- NFL draft: 1999: undrafted

Career history
- Buffalo Bills (1999–2001)

Career NFL statistics
- Games played: 31
- Games started: 13
- Tackles: 31
- Fumble recoveries: 1
- Stats at Pro Football Reference

Raion Yance Hill (born September 2, 1976) is an American former professional football player who was a safety for two seasons with the Buffalo Bills of the National Football League (NFL). He played college football for the LSU Tigers.

He attended Brother Martin High School in New Orleans, Louisiana, and graduated in 1994. He then went on to play at Louisiana State University. However, he broke his leg in 1995 and had a titanium rod placed in it. In his first defensive start against Auburn, he returned one interception 39 yards for a touchdown and another interception 98 yards for two points on a two-point conversion. The game was dubbed "The Night the Barn Burned". Hill finished his college career with 102 tackles and three interceptions.

After going undrafted in the 1999 NFL draft, Hill was cut by the Buffalo Bills and signed to their practice squad later in the season. He made the final roster in 2000 and played in all 16 games, leading the special teams unit with 39 tackles. Hill became the team's starting strong safety in 2001 after the release of veteran Henry Jones.

== Personal life ==
On the morning of January 22, 2001, Hill was carjacked at gunpoint in Louisiana, suffering a leg injury in the incident. One of his two assailants, 23-year-old Lionel Redditt, was sentenced to 50 years in prison for his role in the crime.
