= Jeremy McDaniel =

American football player (born 1976)

No. 86
- Position: Wide receiver

Personal information
- Born: May 2, 1976 (age 50); New Bern, North Carolina, U.S.
- Listed height: 6 ft 0 in (1.83 m)
- Listed weight: 197 lb (89 kg)

Career information
- High school: New Bern
- College: Arizona
- NFL draft: 1999: undrafted

Career history
- Buffalo Bills (1999–2001); San Diego Chargers (2002); Indiana Firebirds (2003); Chicago Rush (2004–2005)

Awards and highlights
- Second-team All-Pac-10 (1998)

Career NFL statistics
- Games played: 24
- Receptions: 54
- Receiving yards: 826
- Touchdowns: 2
- Stats at Pro Football Reference
- Stats at ArenaFan.com

Jeremy Dwayne McDaniel (born May 2, 1976) is an American former professional football player who was a wide receiver for three seasons with the Buffalo Bills of the National Football League (NFL) from 1998 to 2001. He played college football for the Arizona Wildcats.

== Football career ==
McDaniel played for the University of Arizona in his college years. He was picked up by the Buffalo Bills as a free agent. He was traded to San Diego Chargers after a knee injury but never played during a game. From 2003 to 2005, Mc Daniel played in the Arena Football League (AFL) for both the Indiana Firebirds and Chicago Rush. He finished his AFL career with 198 catches for 2,309 yards and 41 touchdowns.

== Personal life ==
He was born in New Bern, North Carolina. He loved the game of football ever since and looked up to Hall of Fame receiver Lance Alworth. He resides in New Bern where he works as a high school coach at New Bern High. He has a daughter named Journee.
