= Bobby Collins (tight end) =

American football player (born 1976)

No. 84, 87
- Position: Tight end

Personal information
- Born: August 20, 1976 (age 50); York, Alabama, U.S.
- Listed height: 6 ft 4 in (1.93 m)
- Listed weight: 246 lb (112 kg)

Career information
- College: North Alabama
- NFL draft: 1999: 4th round, 122nd overall pick

Career history
- Buffalo Bills (1999–2000); Green Bay Packers (2001)

Career NFL statistics
- Receptions: 16
- Receiving yards: 199
- Kick returns: 1
- Return yards: 6
- Touchdowns: 2
- Assisted tackles: 3
- Stats at Pro Football Reference

Bobby Eugene Collins (born August 20, 1976) is an American former professional football player who was a tight end in the National Football League (NFL). He played college football for the North Alabama Lions. Collins was selected by the Buffalo Bills in the fourth round of the 1999 NFL draft and played two seasons with the team. He would play the 2001 NFL season with the Green Bay Packers.
