= Bishop Harris =

American football coach (1941–2024)

Biographical details
- Born: November 23, 1941; Phenix City, Alabama, U.S.
- Died: May 29, 2024 (aged 82); Greensboro, North Carolina, U.S.

Coaching career (HC unless noted)
- 1972–1975: Duke (GA/LB)
- 1977–1979: NC State (LB)
- 1980–1983: LSU (OLB)
- 1984: Notre Dame (DE)
- 1985: Notre Dame (LB)
- 1986–1987: Minnesota (OLB)
- 1988–1990: Minnesota (RB)
- 1991–1992: North Carolina Central
- 1993–1994: Denver Broncos (RB)
- 1995–1997: Oakland Raiders (RB)
- 1998–1999: Buffalo Bills (RB)
- 2001–2004: New York Jets (RB)
- 2005–2007: San Francisco 49ers (RB)

Head coaching record
- Overall: 7–14

Bishop Harris (November 23, 1941 – May 29, 2024) was an American college and professional football coach whose career spanned more than 30 years. He was the 16th head football coach at North Carolina Central University located in Durham, North Carolina, a position he held from 1991 until 1992, compiling an overall college football record of sevens wins and 14 losses. Harris also served as an assistant coach in the National Football League (NFL) for 14 seasons, including stints with the Denver Broncos, Oakland Raiders, Buffalo Bills, New York Jets, and San Francisco 49ers. Harris died in Greensboro, North Carolina, on May 29, 2024, at the age of 82.

== Coaching career ==
Harris began his coaching career at Duke. From there, he moved to North Carolina State, coaching linebackers under Bo Rein (1977–1979). When Rein was named head coach at Louisiana State, Harris followed him in the same capacity. In 1984, Harris joined the coaching staff at Notre Dame under Gerry Faust. He initially coached the Fighting Irish defensive ends before becoming the linebackers coach the following year. Bishop then moved to Minnesota where he worked the next five seasons for John Gutekunst, coaching the Golden Gophers outside linebackers (1986–1987) and running backs (1988–1990). He returned to his alma mater in 1991 when he became the 16th head coach in the history of the North Carolina Central football program. In his two seasons at the helm, he led the Eagles to an overall record of 7–14. In 1993, he entered the professional ranks when he joined the Denver Broncos of the National Football League. Harris spent two seasons as Denver's running backs coach, then served in the same capacity for the Oakland Raiders (1995–1997), New York Jets (2001–2004), Buffalo Bills (1998–1999), and San Francisco 49ers (2005–2007).

== Head coaching record ==
| Year | Team | Overall | Conference | Standing | Bowl/playoffs |
|---|---|---|---|---|---|
North Carolina Central Eagles (Central Intercollegiate Athletic Conference) (1991–1992)
| 1991 | North Carolina Central | 4–6 | 3–4 | 6th | |
| 1992 | North Carolina Central | 3–8 | 2–4 | T–8th | |
| North Carolina Central: | | 7–14 | 5–8 | | |
| Total: | | 7–14 | | | |
