= Keith Newman =

American football player (born 1977)

No. 53, 52, 55
- Position: Linebacker

Personal information
- Born: January 19, 1977 (age 49); Tampa, Florida, U.S.
- Listed height: 6 ft 2 in (1.88 m)
- Listed weight: 250 lb (113 kg)

Career information
- High school: Thomas Jefferson (Tampa)
- College: North Carolina
- NFL draft: 1999: 4th round, 119th overall pick

Career history
- Buffalo Bills (1999–2002); Atlanta Falcons (2003); Minnesota Vikings (2004–2005); Miami Dolphins (2006)

Awards and highlights
- Second-team All-ACC (1998)

Career NFL statistics
- Tackles: 316
- Sacks: 23
- Interceptions: 2
- Stats at Pro Football Reference

Keith Anthony Newman (born January 19, 1977) is an American former professional football player who was a linebacker in the National Football League (NFL). He played college football for the North Carolina Tar Heels and was selected 119th overall by the Buffalo Bills in the fourth round of the 1999 NFL draft.

Newman was also a member of the Atlanta Falcons, Minnesota Vikings and Miami Dolphins.

== Early life ==
Newman lettered for three seasons at Thomas Jefferson High School in Tampa, Florida.

Newman won the Guy Toph Award as a senior in 1994. He was the 55th winner of the award which is given to the top high school football player in Hillsborough County.

Newman caught 62 passes for 1,538 yards and 13 touchdowns while at Jefferson.

== College career ==
Newman attended the University of North Carolina at Chapel Hill and was a four-year letterman in football. In football, as a senior, he posted four sacks, 132 tackles, and an interception, and was a second-team All-Atlantic Coast Conference selection.

== Coaching career ==
Newman has since been a defensive coordinator for Wharton High and Robinson High in Tampa, before becoming a one-year head coach at Robinson.
