= Bill Conaty =

American football player (born 1973)

No. 63
- Position: Center

Personal information
- Born: March 8, 1973 (age 53); Baltimore, Maryland, U.S.
- Listed height: 6 ft 2 in (1.88 m)
- Listed weight: 306 lb (139 kg)

Career information
- High school: Camden Catholic (NJ); Milford Academy (CT)
- College: Virginia Tech
- NFL draft: 1997: undrafted

Career history
- Buffalo Bills (1997–2002); New England Patriots (2003)*; Dallas Cowboys (2003); Minnesota Vikings (2004); Arizona Cardinals (2005)
- * Offseason or practice squad member only

Awards and highlights
- First-team All-American (1996)

Career NFL statistics
- Games played: 74
- Games started: 18
- Fumble recoveries: 1
- Stats at Pro Football Reference

William Buckley Conaty Jr. (born March 8, 1973) is an American former professional football player who played center for nine seasons for the Buffalo Bills, Minnesota Vikings, Dallas Cowboys, and the Arizona Cardinals.

Raised in Pennsauken Township, New Jersey, Conaty played prep football at Camden Catholic High School before playing as a postgraduate at Milford Academy.

== College career ==
Conaty was a four-year starter along the offensive line for the Hokies, starting a then record 48 straight games. After starting his freshman year at offensive tackle, Conaty shifted over to center where he started his remaining three seasons. Conaty was a two time all Big East selection. During his senior year, he was named team captain and first-team Sporting News All-American.

== Professional career ==
Conaty signed with the Buffalo Bills in 1997. In the 1997 season, he appeared in one game, a 28–22 loss to the New York Jets. In the 1998 season, he appeared in 15 games and started one. In the 1999 season, he appeared in seven games and started one. In the 2000 season, he appeared in all 16 games. In 2001, his fifth NFL year, he became the Bills' starting center, replacing Jerry Ostroski. He started and played in all 16 games. After the 2001 season, Conaty was named to the USA Today All-Joe team. In the 2002 season, he appeared in 11 games. In the 2004 season, he played for the Minnesota Vikings and appeared in eight games. He finished his career on injured reserve with the Arizona Cardinals.

== Personal life ==
In 2009, Conaty graduated from Rutgers School of Law and is admitted to practice law in New Jersey and Pennsylvania.
