= Bonnie Bernstein =

American sports journalist and executive

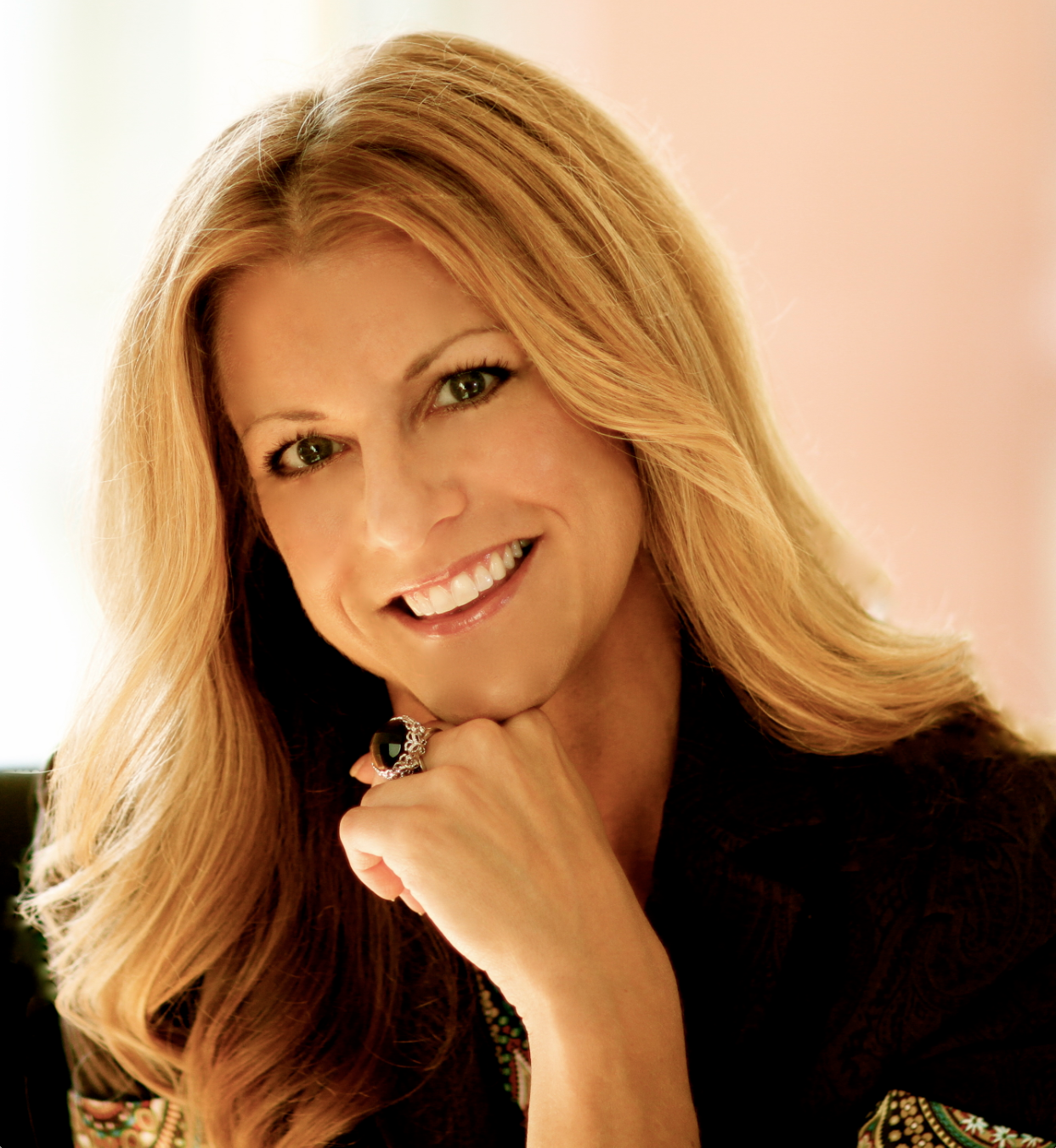
- Bernstein in January 2013
- Born: August 16, 1970 (age 56); New York City, US
- Education: University of Maryland, College Park
- Occupations: Sportscaster, Entrepreneur
- Years active: 1992–present
- Website: www.bonniebernstein.com

Bonnie Lynn Bernstein (born August 16, 1970) is an American sports journalist and media executive. She has been named one of the most accomplished female sportscasters in history by the American Sportscasters Association, spending nearly 20 years as a reporter and studio host at ESPN, ABC and CBS Sports, covering the NFL, NBA, MLB and college football and basketball. Bernstein is currently the founder and CEO of Walk Swiftly Productions, a multimedia production company specializing in non-scripted sports and entertainment content.

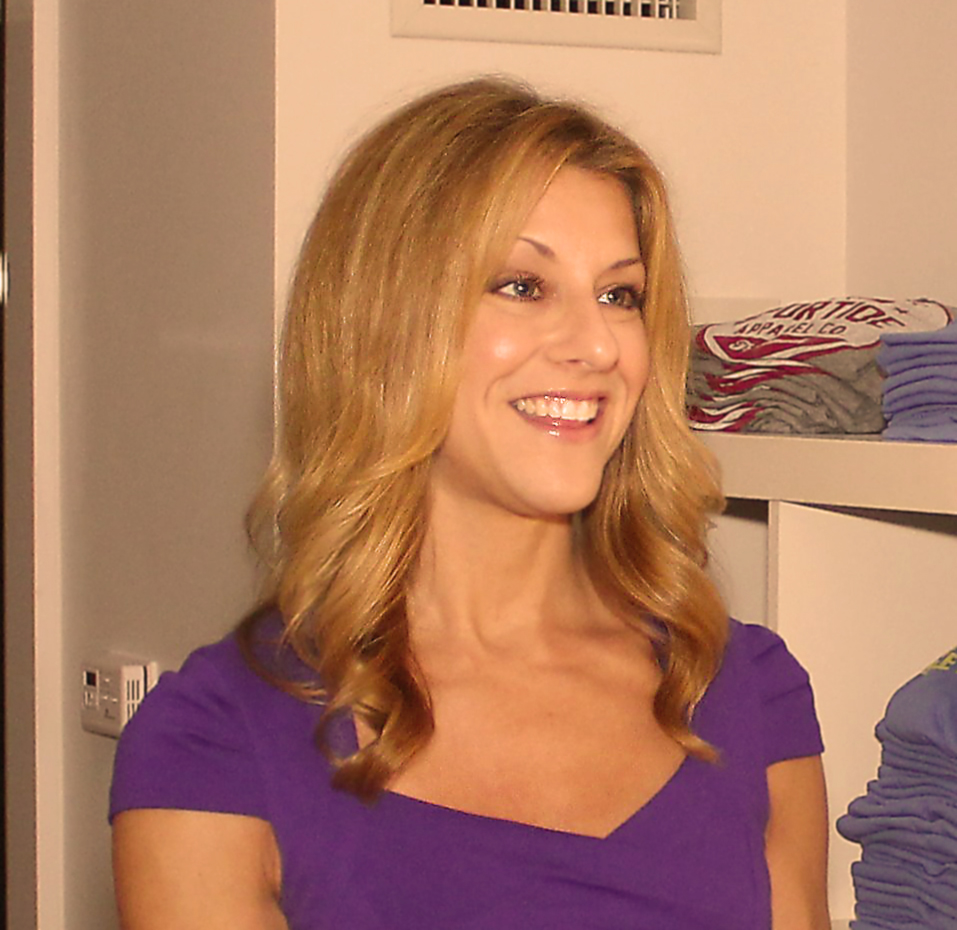
Bernstein in July 2011

== Early life and education ==
Bernstein was born in Brooklyn, New York, and grew up in Howell, New Jersey. She was salutatorian of her class at Howell High School, where she is a member of the school's Hall of Fame. Bernstein was a four-time MVP of the Rebels gymnastics team, and also received varsity letters in indoor track and outdoor track and field, where she competed in hurdles, the 4x400 relay, javelin and shotput. Bernstein attended the University of Maryland, where she graduated magna cum laude with a degree in broadcast journalism. She was a four-time Academic All-America in gymnastics, receiving the Thomas M. Fields award for excellence in academics and athletics. Bernstein maintains close ties to her alma mater, and is on the Board of Visitors for the Philip Merrill College of Journalism at the University of Maryland and the advisory board for the Povich Center for Sports Journalism.

== Career ==
=== Early years ===
Bernstein spent three years climbing the local broadcast ladder, launching her career as the news and sports director at WXJN-FM radio in Lewes, Delaware. She transitioned to television at WMDT-TV in Salisbury, Maryland as the ABC affiliate's weekend news anchor, then became Reno, Nevada's, first-ever female weekday sports anchor at NBC affiliate KRNV-TV.

=== ESPN ===
Bernstein first joined ESPN in 1995 as its Chicago Bureau Chief, where she covered Michael Jordan and the Chicago Bulls' record-setting championship run (1996–98). She also was a correspondent for Sunday NFL Countdown and College GameDay and filed reports for SportsCenter during the Major League Baseball post-season and the NCAA Women's Division I Basketball Championship.

=== CBS Sports ===
Bernstein joined CBS Sports in 1998 as the lead sideline reporter for the NCAA Men's Basketball Championships and feature reporter for The NFL Today. The following year, she transitioned to sideline reporting for the NFL on CBS. She worked with the Verne Lundquist/Dick Enberg and Dan Dierdorf crew until 2003, when she was promoted to the lead crew of Jim Nantz and Phil Simms. Bernstein covered Super Bowls XXXV and XXXVIII for the network and during Super Bowl XXXVIII, became the first correspondent ever to cover the game for both network television and network radio, filing reports for CBS Sports and Westwood One Radio.

Upon signing with CBS/Westwood One Radio in 2001, Bernstein often pulled "double duty" during the NFL season, covering a Sunday game for CBS and Monday Night Football for radio.

In addition to her NFL and college basketball duties, Bernstein hosted the NCAA Women's Gymnastics Championship and CBS' anthology series, Championships of the NCAA, and was a studio host for CBS SportsDesk and At The Half, CBS Sports' college basketball halftime studio show. Bernstein also covered tennis, track and field, horse racing and figure skating for the network and hosted the U.S. Open Tennis Championships studio show and the Hambletonian.

=== Return to ESPN ===
In July 2006, Bernstein rejoined ESPN as the lead college football reporter for ESPN on ABC and the field reporter for Sunday Night Baseball with Jon Miller and Joe Morgan. On October 11, 2006, five days after experiencing severe leg pain while covering the Texas-Oklahoma Red River Rivalry, doctors discovered life-threatening blood clots in both of Bernstein's lungs (pulmonary emboli) that originated in her left leg (deep vein thrombosis). She returned to ESPN and ABC several weeks later, but reduced her travel schedule the following season as a precautionary health measure, shifting focus to studio hosting many of ESPN's high-profile shows, including NFL Live, Jim Rome Is Burning, Outside the Lines, First Take and College Football Live.

=== Radio hosting ===
In September 2009, Bernstein was named co-host of The Michael Kay Show on 1050 ESPN Radio in New York. She also covered the New York Jets and hosted specialty programming during the 2009–10 NFL playoffs. In July 2010, Bernstein was given her own daily NFL show, New York Football Live, co-hosted by Jets linebacker Greg Buttle.

=== Campus Insiders ===
In April 2013, Bernstein was named vice president of Content and Brand Development for Campus Insiders, a digital partnership between Silver Chalice Ventures, founded by Chicago Bulls and White Sox owner Jerry Reinsdorf, and IMG College, the nation's largest collegiate sports marketing company. Bernstein was also the on-air "face" of the network, hosting daily studio shows during the college football season and NCAA Basketball Championship. Her off-air responsibilities included creating original programming for the network, developing and securing new sponsor partnerships, and designing brand extensions that enhanced the reach of CI's digital and social platforms.

=== Walk Swiftly Productions ===
In January 2017, Bernstein founded Walk Swiftly Productions, where she is CEO. Through WSP and her consultancy, Velvet Hammer Media, Bernstein collaborates with some of sports’ most prominent organizations, including the NCAA and the College Football Playoff (CFP). In 2019, ESPN's docuseries, GOOD GAME: UC Irvine, produced by WSP and executive produced by Bernstein, received the Tempest Award for "Best Esports-Themed Program;", and CMT's Country on Campus received nominations for "Best Music Series" and "Best Sports and Recreation" series at the Cynopsis Short Form Video Awards. Other notable WSP titles include the XFL's signature series, “For the Love of Football" and the Audible Originals audio series, She Got Game.

=== Other broadcast work ===
Bernstein is the only female ever to solo fill-in host for the syndicated radio and TV program, The Dan Patrick Show and appears as a guest commentator on several news networks, including NBC, MSNBC and FOX News Channel, to discuss prominent sports stories.
