= Ted Cottrell =

American football player and coach (born 1947)

No. 51
- Position: Linebacker

Personal information
- Born: June 13, 1947 (age 79); Chester, Pennsylvania, U.S.
- Listed height: 6 ft 2 in (1.88 m)
- Listed weight: 233 lb (106 kg)

Career information
- High school: Chester
- College: Delaware Valley (1965-1968)
- NFL draft: 1969: 7th round, 164th overall pick

Career history

Playing
- Atlanta Falcons (1969–1970); Winnipeg Blue Bombers (1971)

Coaching
- Rutgers (1973–1979) Defensive line coach; Rutgers (1980) Defensive coordinator; Kansas City Chiefs (1981–1982) Linebackers coach; Rutgers (1983) Defensive coordinator; New Jersey Generals (1984-1985) Defensive line coach; Buffalo Bills (1986–1989) Defensive line coach; Phoenix Cardinals (1990–1993) Defensive line coach; Arizona Cardinals (1994) Linebackers coach; Buffalo Bills (1995–1997) Linebackers coach; Buffalo Bills (1998–2000) Defensive coordinator; New York Jets (2001–2003) Defensive coordinator; Minnesota Vikings (2004–2005) Defensive coordinator; San Diego Chargers (2007–2008) Defensive coordinator; New York Sentinels (2009) Head coach; Birmingham Iron (2019) Linebackers coach; Houston Roughnecks (2020) Defensive coordinator; TSL Blues (2020–2021) Head coach; New Jersey Generals (2023) Defensive coordinator / linebackers coach

Head coaching record
- Career: 0–6 (.000) (UFL)
- Coaching profile at Pro Football Reference
- Stats at Pro Football Reference

Theodore John Cottrell (born June 13, 1947) is an American football coach and former player. He was formerly the defensive coordinator for the Buffalo Bills, New York Jets, Minnesota Vikings, and the San Diego Chargers in the National Football League (NFL). In 2009, he served as head coach for the New York Sentinels of the United Football League (UFL). Ten years later, he was the linebackers coach for the Birmingham Iron of the Alliance of American Football (AAF), and worked as the defensive coordinator for the Houston Roughnecks of the XFL in 2020.

== Playing career ==
Cottrell started at Delaware Valley College from 1965 to 1968. He was a seventh-round draft pick of the Atlanta Falcons in the 1969 NFL/AFL draft and played linebacker for two seasons. He was the first black linebacker for the Atlanta Falcons. He ended his career with the Canadian Football League's Winnipeg Blue Bombers, where he played for one more year.

== Coaching career ==
Cottrell began his coaching career at Rutgers University, where he worked as an assistant for eight years. In 1981, he got his first NFL coach job when Marv Levy hired him as linebackers coach for the Kansas City Chiefs.

Considered an innovator in the 3–4 defense, Cottrell was an assistant coach for the Buffalo Bills from 1995 to 2000, the last three seasons as defensive coordinator. From 1998 through 2000, the Bills finished no worse than sixth in the league in total defense. In 1999, the Bills led the league in total defense.

In 2001, he joined the New York Jets as assistant head coach and defensive coordinator, and operated the 4–3 scheme favored by head coach Herman Edwards. He stayed for three seasons.

In 2003, Cottrell was a finalist to become the head coach of the San Francisco 49ers. He ultimately lost the job to Dennis Erickson.

Cottrell then spent two seasons (2004–2005) as defensive coordinator for the Minnesota Vikings. In 2005, the Vikings finished fifth in the NFL in takeaways and earned a postseason berth, and defeated the Green Bay Packers in a Wild Card contest. Cotrell was let go, along with Head Coach Mike Tice and the rest of his staff. Cottrell then announced his retirement.

In February 2007, he became the defensive coordinator under new Chargers head coach, Norv Turner. During the regular season, the Chargers led the NFL in takeaways (48), interceptions (30), and passing rating defense (70.0), the first time a Chargers team ever led in any of these categories. In 2008, multiple fans wanted Cottrell to be terminated. At the midpoint of the season, the team had a record of 3–5 despite having a highly effective offense. Some attributed this poor record to the fact that the Chargers ranked last among NFL teams in defending against the pass. Defenses led by Cottrell had similar problems in New York and Minnesota. At the midpoint of the 2008 season, the San Diego defense had gone two entire games without a quarterback sack nor a takeaway.

On October 28, 2008, Cottrell was fired from his position as San Diego's defensive coordinator.

Cottrell was the head coach for the UFL's New York Sentinels in 2009. After one winless season, Cottrell left the organization.

In 2018, Cottrell became the linebackers coach for the Birmingham Iron of the Alliance of American Football. The following year, he was hired by the Houston Roughnecks of the XFL as defensive coordinator. He was named head coach of the Blues of The Spring League on October 15, 2020.

== Personal life ==
Cottrell is the younger brother of Bill Cottrell, who played for the Detroit Lions and Denver Broncos. Cottrell's son, T. J. Cottrell, played professionally for the Vikings, Chargers and Sentinels, in each case under his father as coach.

== Head coaching record ==
Team	Year	Regular season					Postseason			
Team	Year	Won	Lost	Ties	Win %	Finish	Won	Lost	Win %	Result
NYS	2009	0	6	0	.000	4th in UFL	-	-	-	-
Total		0	6	0	.000		-	-	-	-
