= 2001 Buffalo Bills season =

2001 NFL season of the Buffalo Bills

- Owner: Ralph Wilson
- General manager: Tom Donahoe
- Head coach: Gregg Williams
- Home stadium: Ralph Wilson Stadium

Results
- Record: 3–13
- Division place: 5th AFC East
- Playoffs: Did not qualify
- Pro Bowlers: FB Larry Centers; G Ruben Brown

The 2001 season was the Buffalo Bills' 42nd season overall, their 32nd in the National Football League (NFL), and their first season under head coach Gregg Williams. At 3–13, they finished the season with the worst record in the whole American Football Conference and at last place in the AFC East division for the first time since 1985. This would be the most losses the Bills ever suffered in a season during their playoff drought from 2000 to 2016.

John Butler, who had been the Bills' general manager from 1993 to 2000, left to take the same position with the San Diego Chargers. He was replaced by Tom Donahoe, who would remain with the Bills through the 2005 season.

In the wake of Buffalo's 1999-2000 quarterback controversy, Doug Flutie was released by the Bills prior to the season and followed Butler to San Diego. Buffalo named Rob Johnson their starting quarterback for the 2001 season, which would ultimately be his last in Buffalo. Bills defensive end Marcellus Wiley, linebacker Sam Rogers, and linebacker John Holecek also left Buffalo for San Diego in 2001, leaving a gap in Buffalo's defense. The special teams also saw a major overhaul. Placekicker Steve Christie was also among the defectors to San Diego, forcing the Bills to sign rookie Jake Arians (son of longtime offensive coordinator and eventual NFL head coach Bruce Arians) as a replacement, then after several weeks of Arians's poor play, Shayne Graham. Punter Chris Mohr left for the Atlanta Falcons and was replaced by Brian Moorman, who would stay with the team for the next eleven seasons. The Bills switched to a 4–3 defensive scheme after using a 3–4 scheme since 1979.

== Offseason ==
Additions	Subtractions
FB Larry Centers (Redskins)	QB Doug Flutie (Chargers)
	LS Ethan Albright (Redskins)
	RB Antowain Smith (Patriots)
	P Chris Mohr (Falcons)
	DE Marcellus Wiley (Chargers)
	G Joe Panos (Patriots)
	LB John Holecek (Chargers)
	G Jamie Nails (Dolphins)
	LB Sam Rogers (Chargers)
	DT Ted Washington (Bears)
	CB Donovan Greer (Redskins)
	T Marcus Spriggs (Dolphins)
	S Henry Jones (Vikings)
	K Steve Christie (Chargers)

=== NFL draft ===
Buffalo's 2001 draft was general manager Tom Donahoe first with the team. The Bills' first three draft picks — Nate Clements, Aaron Schobel and Travis Henry — went on to make the Pro Bowl with the Bills.

2001 Buffalo Bills draft
Round	Pick	Player	Position	College	Notes
1	21	Nate Clements *	Cornerback	Ohio State	from Tampa Bay
2	46	Aaron Schobel *	Defensive end	TCU	
2	58	Travis Henry *	Running back	Tennessee	from Denver
3	76	Ron Edwards	Defensive tackle	Texas A&M	
3	95	Jonas Jennings	Offensive tackle	Georgia	
4	110	Brandon Spoon	Linebacker	North Carolina	from Denver
5	144	Marques Sullivan	Offensive tackle	Illinois	
6	178	Tony Driver	Free Safety	Notre Dame	
6	195	Dan O'Leary	Long snapper	Notre Dame	
6	196	Jimmy R. Williams	Cornerback	Vanderbilt	
7	214	Reggie Germany	Wide receiver	Ohio State	
7	238	Tyrone Robertson	Defensive tackle	Georgia	
Made roster * Made at least one Pro Bowl during career

=== Undrafted free agents ===
2001 undrafted free agents of note
Player	Position	College
Stephen Campbell	Wide receiver	Brown
Randall Cummins	Center	Kansas State
Matt Davison	Wide receiver	Nebraska
Ryan Diepenbrock	Long snapper	Bowling Green
David Dinkins	Quarterback	Morehead State
Donny Green	Linebacker	Virginia
Tim Hasselbeck	Quarterback	Boston College
Teddy Johnson	Wide receiver	Northwestern
Josh Lind	Offensive tackle	Oklahoma State
Carl Nesmith	Safety	Kansas
Kendrick Office	Defensive end	West Alabama
DeVonte Peterson	Defensive tackle	Catawba
Pat Pidgeon	Punter	Penn State
Jonathan Pittman	Wide receiver	BYU
Clark Roosendaal	Tackle	Nevada
Josh Whitman	Tight end	Illinois

== Personnel ==
=== Staff / Coaches ===
2001 Buffalo Bills staff
Front office: Owner – Ralph Wilson; President and general manager – Tom Donahoe; Vice president of player personnel – Dwight Adams; Director of football operations – Tom Modrak; Director of pro personnel – John Guy; Head coaches: Head coach – Gregg Williams; Administrative assistant to the head coach – Chuck Lester; Offensive coaches: Offensive coordinator – Mike Sheppard; Quarterbacks – Steve Kragthorpe; Running backs – Steve Fairchild; Wide receivers – Fred Graves; Tight ends – Dan Neal; Offensive line – Ronnie Vinklarek; Offensive assistant – Tommy Kaiser	Defensive coaches: Defensive coordinator – Jerry Gray; Defensive line – John Levra; Linebackers – Miles Aldridge; Defensive backs – Pat Thomas; Assistant defensive backs/third down specialist – Steve Jackson; Defensive assistant – Chuck Lester; Special teams coaches: Special teams – Danny Smith; Special teams assistant – Tommy Kaiser; Strength and conditioning: Strength and conditioning coordinator – Rusty Jones

=== Roster ===
2001 Buffalo Bills roster
Quarterbacks (QB): 5 Travis Brown; 11 Rob Johnson; 10 Alex Van Pelt; Running backs (RB): 38 Shawn Bryson KR; 37 Larry Centers FB; 41 Phil Crosby FB; 20 Travis Henry; 33 Sammy Morris; Wide receivers (WR): 89 Avion Black KR/PR; 84 Reggie Germany; 86 Jeremy McDaniel; 80 Eric Moulds; 81 Peerless Price; Tight ends (TE): 88 Sheldon Jackson; 82 Scot Osborne; 85 Jay Riemersma	Offensive linemen (OL): 79 Ruben Brown G; 65 Jon Carman T; 63 Bill Conaty C; 70 John Fina T; 67 Craig Heimburger G; 71 Corey Hulsey G; 75 Jonas Jennings T; 68 Morris Unutoa C/LS; 74 Marques Sullivan T; Defensive linemen (DL): 98 Ron Edwards DT; 95 Bryce Fisher DE; 96 Erik Flowers DE; 90 Phil Hansen DE; 97 Leif Larsen DT; 77 Kendrick Office DE; 92 Tyrone Robertson DT; 94 Aaron Schobel DE; 93 Pat Williams DT	Linebackers (LB): 55 Jay Foreman OLB; 99 Fred Jones OLB; 53 Keith Newman OLB; 51 DaShon Polk OLB; 54 Jimmy Robinson OLB; 58 Brandon Spoon MLB; 57 Kenyatta Wright MLB; Defensive backs (DB): 31 Lance Brown SS; 29 Keion Carpenter FS; 22 Nate Clements CB/KR/PR; 39 Raion Hill SS; 27 Ken Irvin CB; 23 Pierson Prioleau SS; 28 Travares Tillman FS; 21 Chris Watson CB; 26 Antoine Winfield CB; Special teams (ST): 17 Shayne Graham K; 8 Brian Moorman P	Practice squad: -- Curtis Alexander RB; -- Reggie Allen WR (IR); -- Eugene Baker WR; -- David Dinkins QB; -- John Romero C/G; Reserve: 25 Tony Driver S/KR (IR); 72 Kris Farris T (IR); 87 Dan O'Leary TE/LS (IR); 60 Jerry Ostroski G/T (IR); 91 Shawn Price DT (IR); 56 Sam Cowart LB (IR); Rookies in italics 52 active, 7 reserve, 4 practice squad

== Preseason ==
Week	Date	Opponent	Result	Record	Venue
1	August 12	St. Louis Rams	L 10–24	1–0	Ralph Wilson Stadium
2	August 18	Philadelphia Eagles	W 6–3	1–1	Ralph Wilson Stadium
3	August 25	at Cincinnati Bengals	W 20–10	2–1	Paul Brown Stadium
4	August 30	at Pittsburgh Steelers	L 0–20	2–2	Heinz Field

== Regular season ==
=== Schedule ===
Week	Date	Opponent	Result	Record	Venue	Attendance	Recap
1	September 9	New Orleans Saints	**L** 6–24	0–1	Ralph Wilson Stadium	71,447	Recap
2 (Note: The Bills were originally scheduled to play the Miami Dolphins during Week 2 of the original NFL schedule (September 16) at Pro Player Stadium in Miami Gardens. However, due to the September 11 attacks, the game was rescheduled to Week 17.)	September 23	at **Indianapolis Colts**	**L** 26–42	0–2	RCA Dome	56,135	Recap
3	September 30	Pittsburgh Steelers	**L** 3–20	0–3	Ralph Wilson Stadium	72,874	Recap
4	October 7	**New York Jets**	**L** 36–42	0–4	Ralph Wilson Stadium	72,654	Recap
5	Bye						
6	October 18	at Jacksonville Jaguars	**W** 13–10	1–4	Alltel Stadium	58,893	Recap
7	October 28	at San Diego Chargers	**L** 24–27	1–5	Qualcomm Stadium	63,698	Recap
8	November 4	**Indianapolis Colts**	**L** 14–30	1–6	Ralph Wilson Stadium	63,786	Recap
9	November 11	at **New England Patriots**	**L** 11–21	1–7	Foxboro Stadium	60,292	Recap
10	November 18	Seattle Seahawks	**L** 20–23	1–8	Ralph Wilson Stadium	60,836	Recap
11	November 25	**Miami Dolphins**	**L** 27–34	1–9	Ralph Wilson Stadium	73,063	Recap
12	December 2	at San Francisco 49ers	**L** 0–35	1–10	3Com Park	67,252	Recap
13	December 9	Carolina Panthers	**W** 25–24	2–10	Ralph Wilson Stadium	44,549	Recap
14	December 16	**New England Patriots**	**L** 9–12 (OT)	2–11	Ralph Wilson Stadium	45,527	Recap
15	December 23	at Atlanta Falcons	**L** 30–33	2–12	Georgia Dome	43,320	Recap
16	December 30	at **New York Jets**	**W** 14–9	3–12	Giants Stadium	78,200	Recap
17	January 6	at **Miami Dolphins**	**L** 7–34	3–13	Pro Player Stadium	73,428	Recap
Note: Intra-division opponents are in **bold** text.

=== Game summaries ===
==== Week 1: vs. New Orleans Saints ====
	1	2	3	4	Total
Saints	0	0	17	7	**24**
**Bills**	3	3	0	0	**6**

at Ralph Wilson Stadium, Orchard Park, New York

- Date: September 9, 2001
- Game time: 1:00 p.m. EST
- Weather: Sunny, 87 °F (30.6 °C), humidity 52% wind 10 mph (16 km/h; 8.7 kn)
- TV: FOX
- Announcers: Scott Graham, D.J. Johnson
- Referee: Larry Mallam

The Gregg Williams era began inauspiciously in this game against former Bills linebacker Jim Haslett and the New Orleans Saints. The Bills led 6–0 at halftime, but in the second half the Saints turned the game into a rout. Saints quarterback Aaron Brooks went long and found Albert Connell for a 46-yard touchdown to give the Saints the lead, then later in the quarter threw another touchdown pass to tight end Cam Cleeland to make the score 17–6. Ricky Williams added another touchdown on a 19-yard reception from Brooks late in the fourth quarter to clinch the game for the Saints.

Rob Johnson threw three interceptions, all of which were intercepted by Saints safety Sammy Knight. Linebacker Sam Cowart hurt his achilles' heel in the first quarter, he would go on to miss the rest of the season and sign with the New York Jets the following season.

==== Week 2: at Indianapolis Colts ====
	1	2	3	4	Total
Bills	7	10	3	6	**26**
**Colts**	14	21	7	0	**42**

at RCA Dome, Indianapolis, Indiana

- Date: September 23, 2001
- Game time: 1:00 p.m. EST
- Weather: Dome
- TV: CBS
- Announcers: Don Criqui, Steve Tasker
- Referee: Bill Carollo

The Bills then traveled to Indianapolis to take on the Colts, who were coming off an impressive road win at the Jets two weeks prior. Surprisingly, the Bills struck first with rookie cornerback Nate Clements intercepting a Peyton Manning pass and returning it 48 yards for a touchdown. However, after this play it was all Colts. Edgerrin James scored on a one-yard touchdown plunge to tie the score at 7–7, then Manning threw a 60-yard bomb to receiver Jerome Pathon to make the score 14–7 at the end of the first quarter. Rookie running back Travis Henry answered with a 4-yard touchdown to tie the score at 14–14, but then Manning found Marvin Harrison for three touchdowns in the second quarter. The first two were from 39 yards apiece, and the third was a 7-yard touchdown to make the score 35–17 Colts at the half. In the third quarter Colts linebacker Rob Morris was ejected for unnecessary roughness and for inadvertently bumping up into referee Bill Carollo's mouth. Late in the fourth quarter, on a 4th and 34, Rob Johnson threw a 40-yard touchdown pass to Peerless Price in the end zone cutting the score 42–26, and also converting the longest 4th down in known NFL history, but the Bills failed on a 2-point conversion pass.

The Bills allowed a whopping 555 yards of total offense, with Peyton Manning throwing for 421 yards and 4 touchdowns (albeit with two interceptions).

==== Week 3: vs. Pittsburgh Steelers ====
	1	2	3	4	Total
Steelers	7	3	0	10	**20**
**Bills**	0	3	0	0	**3**

at Ralph Wilson Stadium, Orchard Park, New York

- Date: September 30, 2001
- Game time: 1:00 p.m. EST
- Weather: Sunny, 63 °F (17.2 °C), 48% humidity, wind 7 mph (11 km/h; 6.1 kn)
- TV: CBS
- Announcers: Ian Eagle, Solomon Wilcots
- Referee: Tom White

The Bills' next game was at home against the Steelers, where they continued to struggle. Near the end of the first quarter, Travis Henry fumbled in Steeler territory, and Dewayne Washington returned the loose ball 63 yards for a touchdown to open the scoring, 7–0. In the fourth quarter, the Steelers broke open the game with running back Chris Fuamatu-Ma'afala running in for a 22-yard touchdown to make it 20–3.

The Bills were held to a mere 172 yards of total offense.

==== Week 4: vs. New York Jets ====
	1	2	3	4	Total
Jets	21	7	14	0	**42**
**Bills**	6	9	7	14	**36**

at Ralph Wilson Stadium, Orchard Park, New York

- Date: October 7, 2001
- Game time: 4:05 p.m. EST
- Weather: Mostly Cloudy light rain, 44 °F (6.7 °C), 51% humidity, Wind 16 mph (26 km/h; 14 kn)
- TV: CBS
- Announcers: Kevin Harlan, Craig James, and Beasley Reece
- Referee: Ron Winter

In danger of falling to their worst start in over a decade, the Bills opened this matchup by going into their bag of tricks. Rookie punter Brian Moorman attempted a surprise onside kick on the opening play of the game, and the Bills recovered. However, the Bills failed to score with Sammy Morris losing a fumble on the third play of the drive, and the Jets capitalized on the turnover by driving down for a 16-yard Curtis Martin touchdown run to make it 7–0. On the ensuing drive, Rob Johnson threw an interception deep in his own territory to linebacker Marvin Jones, and the Jets capitalized with Vinny Testaverde finding fullback Richie Anderson for a 4-yard touchdown on the very next play to make it 14–0 Jets. Johnson answered with a 46-yard touchdown pass to Eric Moulds, but a failed two-point conversion kept the score at 14–6. The next Bills drive lasted only one play as linebacker Mo Lewis sacked Johnson and forced him to fumble, with lineman John Abraham returning the fumble 7 yards for another Jets touchdown. Gregg Williams was 0–2 on replay challenges. The next play from scrimmage featured an injury. Just as he had two weeks earlier when he knocked out Drew Bledsoe against the Patriots to begin the Tom Brady era, Mo Lewis hit Rob Johnson at the end of a 17-yard run and knocked him out of the game, forcing longtime backup Alex Van Pelt to take over at quarterback.

Alex Van Pelt played well in his relief appearance, and after Curtis Martin added another touchdown to make the score 28–9 Jets, the Bills began to mount a comeback. Late in the first half, Van Pelt found tight end Jay Riemersma for a 3-yard touchdown to make the score 28–15 at the half. Then on the opening drive of the second half, Van Pelt found Peerless Price for a 70-yard touchdown to cut the deficit to just 6, 28–22. However, the Jets stretched the lead back to 20 points with Vinny Testaverde finding tight end Anthony Becht for a 2-yard touchdown, then with Mo Lewis recovering a Larry Centers fumble and returning it 15 yards for another touchdown to make the score 42–22. With 4:37 to go, Centers did run in for a 2-yard touchdown to make the score 42–29, then the Bills forced a punt. Van Pelt led the Bills to another touchdown by finding Centers for a 7-yard touchdown to make the score 42–36, the drive took much time due to short passes and only 7 seconds remained at this point. The Bills' subsequent onside kick was recovered by the Jets and the game then ended.

Alex Van Pelt was 23 of 41 for 268 yards and 3 touchdowns with 1 interception. Travis Henry ran for 113 yards on 19 carries for his first career 100-yard game, Eric Moulds caught 5 passes for 107 yards and a touchdown, and Peerless Price added 4 catches for 103 yards and a touchdown.

Although the Bills outgained the Jets 473–335, the turnover battle decided the game as the Bills committed 5 turnovers to the Jets' 0.

==== Week 6: at Jacksonville Jaguars ====
Team	1	2	3	4	Total
• Bills	0	3	7	3	13
Jaguars	0	0	7	3	10

- Date: October 18
- Location: Alltel Stadium, Jacksonville, Florida
- Game start: 8:30 p.m.
- Game weather: 62 °F (16.7 °C), wind 15 mph (24 km/h; 13 kn)
- Referee: Gerald Austin
- TV announcers (ESPN): Mike Patrick, Joe Theismann, Paul Maguire, and Suzy Kolber

Scoring summary
1	BUF	Jake Arians 30 yard field goal	Bills 3–0
3	JAC	Kyle Brady 20 yard pass from Mark Brunell (Mike Hollis kick)	Jaguars 7–3
3	BUF	Eric Moulds 27 yard pass from Rob Johnson (Jake Arians kick)	Bills 10–7
4	JAC	Mike Hollis 41 yard field goal	Tie 10–10
4	BUF	Jake Arians 46 yard field goal	Bills 13–10

The Bills finally got into the win column with this win over the slumping Jaguars in a Thursday night clash. They led 3–0 at halftime after a 30-yard field goal by kicker Jake Arians. In the third quarter, Jaguars quarterback Mark Brunell found tight end Kyle Brady for a 20-yard touchdown pass to make the score 7–3, but on the ensuing drive Rob Johnson hit Eric Moulds for a 27-yard touchdown to make the score 10–7. Late in the fourth quarter with the score tied 10–10, the Bills drove to the Jaguars' 29-yard line. Arians made a 46-yard field goal with 1:03 to go to give the Bills the lead, then safety Travares Tillman intercepted a Brunell pass on the next drive with 44 seconds left to seal the win.

==== Week 7: at San Diego Chargers ====
	1	2	3	4	Total
Bills	0	10	0	14	**24**
**Chargers**	10	3	0	14	**27**

at Qualcomm Stadium, San Diego, California

- Date: October 28, 2001
- Game time: 1:15 p.m. PST (4:15 p.m. EST)
- Weather: Overcast 65 °F (18.3 °C), humidity 86%, wind 7 mph (11 km/h; 6.1 kn)
- TV: CBS
- Announcers: Craig Bolerjack, Trevor Matich, and Scott Kaplan
- Referee: Tony Corrente

Among the most hyped games of the year for the Bills was this game against the Chargers. This was in large part due to the number of Bills players and executive from the previous season's team that were now part of the Chargers, including general manager John Butler, quarterback Doug Flutie, and defensive end Marcellus Wiley. Of particular note was the head-to-head quarterback battle between Flutie and Rob Johnson, who had jousted with each other for the Bills' starting quarterback position over the previous three seasons. Overall, the 2001 San Diego Chargers featured 6 former Bills: Steve Christie, Doug Flutie, John Holecek, John Parrella, Sam Rogers, and Marcellus Wiley.

The Chargers came out strong with a 10–0 lead at the end of the first quarter. Doug Flutie found tight end Freddie Jones for a one-yard touchdown in the quarter. However, the Bills rallied at the end of the half with Rob Johnson running in for a 1-yard touchdown and Jake Arians kicking a 41-yard field goal as time expired in the half to make the score 13–10 Chargers.

In the fourth quarter, Jason Perry intercepted a Rob Johnson pass and returned it 37 yards for a touchdown to make the score 20–10 Chargers. However, on the very next play from scrimmage, Johnson hit Peerless Price for a 61-yard touchdown to make the score 20–17 with 10:11 to go. After the following Chargers drive ended with a missed field goal, the Bills drove down the field and scored a touchdown with Travis Henry scoring on a one-yard plunge to make the score 24–20 Bills with just 1:30 remaining. However, special teams would cost the Bills the game. On the ensuing kickoff, Chargers kick returner Ronney Jenkins returned the ball 72 yards to the Bills' 26 yard line, and an unsportsmanlike conduct penalty on Brian Moorman added half the distance to the goal. On the next play, Doug Flutie ran in for a 13-yard touchdown to make the score 27–24 Chargers with 1:10 to go. Despite this turn of events, the Bills were not done. A 25-yard pass from Rob Johnson to Jay Riemersma moved the ball to field goal range in the final moments of the game. However, with 7 seconds remaining, Jake Arians' 44-yard field goal attempt was blocked.

In the battle of the two quarterbacks, Rob Johnson went 24 of 37 for 310 yards with a touchdown and an interception, while Doug Flutie was 21 of 33 for 254 yards and a touchdown. Both players added a rushing touchdown as well. While Johnson outgained Flutie through the air and on the ground, Flutie's quarterback rating was 97.3 to Johnson's 88.8.

Former Bill Marcellus Wiley added 2 sacks against his former team.

==== Week 8: vs. Indianapolis Colts ====
	1	2	3	4	Total
Colts	0	17	7	6	**30**
**Bills**	0	7	0	7	**14**

at Ralph Wilson Stadium, Orchard Park, New York

- Date: November 4, 2001
- Game time: 1:00 p.m. EST (originally scheduled for 4:15 p.m.)
- Weather: Partly Cloudy 53 °F (11.7 °C), humidity 80%, wind 20 mph (32 km/h; 17 kn)
- TV: CBS (Blacked out locally)
- Announcers: Don Criqui, Steve Tasker
- Referee: Walt Coleman

Although they themselves were now in the midst of a disappointing season, the Colts still beat the Bills soundly upon the rematch at Orchard Park. The Colts scored first on the first play of the second quarter with Peyton Manning finding tight end Marcus Pollard for a 15-yard score. Nate Clements tied the game for the Bills with a 66-yard punt return touchdown. Gregg Williams won his first replay challenge for the first time all season. However, the Bills suffered a defensive breakdown on the next series. Manning called for a naked bootleg, and despite his slow speed outran the Bills to the end zone untouched for a 33-yard touchdown run (the longest run of his career) to make the score 14–7 Colts. In the third quarter, running back Dominic Rhodes ran in for a 1-yard touchdown to make the score a three score game, 24–7.

==== Week 9: at New England Patriots ====
	1	2	3	4	Total
Bills	0	3	0	8	**11**
**Patriots**	7	0	7	7	**21**

at Foxboro Stadium, Foxborough, Massachusetts

- Date: November 11, 2001
- Game time: 1:00 p.m. EST
- Weather: Sunny 47 °F (8.3 °C), humidity 41%, Wind 25 mph (40 km/h; 22 kn), wind chill 24°
- TV: CBS
- Announcers: Gus Johnson, Brent Jones
- Referee: Jeff Triplette

Tom Brady's reign of terror against the Bills began with this Week 9 matchup that saw the Patriots improve to over .500 for the first time in their first Super Bowl season. However, it would be former Bill Antowain Smith who would do the most damage in this contest.

The Patriots would open the scoring in the first quarter with Tom Brady finding running back Kevin Faulk for a 6-yard touchdown to make the score 7–0. A 24-yard Jake Arians field goal made the score 7–3 at the half. In the third quarter, Antowain Smith ran in for a 1-yard score to make the score 14–3 Patriots heading in the final quarter. With under 5 minutes remaining, cornerback Terrell Buckley sacked Rob Johnson, who suffered a season-ending injury in the process. Johnson was replaced by Alex Van Pelt as the Bills turned it over on downs by failing to convert a 4th and 27 with 4:07 left. However, on the ensuing possession, defensive end Kendrick Office sacked Brady and forced him to fumble, with fellow lineman Jay Foreman recovering the ball to put the Bills back in the game. The Bills capitalized on the turnover with Van Pelt finding Peerless Price for a 17-yard touchdown score two plays later, and the ensuing two point conversion made the score 14–11 Patriots with 2:43 to go. However, the ensuing onside kick was recovered by the Patriots, and two plays later, Smith broke through for a 42-yard touchdown to clinch the game. Interestingly, the bills had one last chance to catch up but Van Pelt was intercepted by Ty Law preserving the pats victory.

One bright spot for the Bills in this game was their pass rush. The Bills broke through the Patriots' strong O-line for 7 sacks, with Kendrick Office, Tyrone Robertson, and rookie defensive end Aaron Schobel all contributing two sacks apiece. However, the Bills allowed their former running back Antowain Smith to run for 100 yards and 2 touchdowns on 20 carries.

The game was Rob Johnson's final appearance as a Buffalo Bill, as Alex Van Pelt started for the remainder of the season. Fittingly, he was sacked 5 times.

==== Week 10: vs. Seattle Seahawks ====
	1	2	3	4	Total
Seahawks	3	7	7	6	**23**
**Bills**	0	10	3	7	**20**

at Ralph Wilson Stadium, Orchard Park, New York

- Date: November 18, 2001
- Game time: 1:00 p.m. EST
- Weather: Sunny, 55 °F (12.8 °C), humidity 56%, wind 14 mph (23 km/h; 12 kn)
- TV: CBS (Blacked out locally)
- Announcers: Don Criqui, Steve Tasker
- Referee: Bernie Kukar

The Bills kicked off a two-week homestand with a home matchup against the Seahawks. In the second quarter, Matt Hasselbeck found rookie wide receiver Koren Robinson for a 7-yard touchdown to make the score 10–0 Seattle. However, the Bills struck back with Alex Van Pelt finding Peerless Price for a 16-yard touchdown on the ensuing drive to make the score 10–7, and Jake Arians's 25-yard field goal tied the score at 10–10 at halftime. In the third quarter, Seattle regained the lead with running back Shaun Alexander scoring on a 1-yard run to make it 17–10. Two field goals by future Bill Rian Lindell, including one from 51 yards, made the score 23–13 Seahawks with just 3:12 to go. Van Pelt hit Jay Riemersma for a 6-yard touchdown to cut the deficit to 3, 23–20, with 1:23 to go. However, Seahawks cornerback Shawn Springs recovered Arians's ensuing onside kick and the game then ended.

The Bills outgained the Seahawks 372–246, but committed 2 turnovers, while the Seahawks committed none.

Despite the loss, Alex Van Pelt played well in his first start of the season, going 28–42 for 316 yards and 2 touchdowns with no interceptions. Peerless Price was the leading receiver with 10 catches for 138 yards and a touchdown.

During halftime, longtime quarterback Jim Kelly's name was added to the Bills Wall of Fame, and his number 12 jersey was retired. It was the first number retired by the Buffalo Bills, and as of 2017 is one of only two numbers to have been retired by the franchise (Bruce Smith's #78 is the other).

==== Week 11: vs. Miami Dolphins ====
	1	2	3	4	Total
Dolphins	7	3	0	24	**34**
**Bills**	7	7	7	6	**27**

at Ralph Wilson Stadium, Orchard Park, New York

- Date: November 25, 2001
- Game time: 1:00 p.m. EST
- Weather: Cloudy 63 °F (17.2 °C), humidity 64%, Wind 18 mph (29 km/h; 16 kn)
- TV: CBS
- Announcers: Kevin Harlan, Craig James, and Beasley Reece
- Referee: Terry McAulay

The Dolphins opened the scoring in this divisional game with running back Lamar Smith scoring a 1-yard touchdown, but the Bills answered on the very next play from scrimmage with Alex Van Pelt finding Eric Moulds for an 80-yard touchdown to tie the score at 7–7. With 6 seconds to go in the half, the Bills capped off an 80-yard drive with Van Pelt finding Sheldon Jackson for a 1-yard touchdown pass to give the Bills a surprising 14–10 lead at the half. On the opening drive of the second half, Van Pelt threw a 54-yard touchdown pass to Moulds, and the score was 21–10 Bills heading into the final quarter.

However, the fourth quarter was a Bills meltdown. On the opening play of the quarter, Jay Fiedler found tight end Jed Weaver for an 8-yard touchdown pass to narrow the score 21–17. The Bills answered with another touchdown drive, capped off by Travis Henry's 8-yard touchdown run with 8:16 to go. However, Jake Arians whiffed on the extra point, and the score remained 27–17. On the following drive, Fiedler found rookie wide receiver Chris Chambers for a 22-yard touchdown pass to cut the score to 27–24 with 4:07 to play. After a Bills punt, the Dolphins drove into field goal range, and Olindo Mare kicked a 39-yard field goal to tie the score at 27–27 with just 1:11 to go. On the very next play, Nate Clements fumbled the kick return, and Dolphins corner Patrick Surtain recovered at the Bills' 42 yard line. Two plays later, Fiedler hooked up with Chambers for his second touchdown of the quarter, a 32-yard pass that gave the Dolphins a stunning 34–27 lead with 48 seconds remaining. Alex Van Pelt attempted to get the Bills down the field for a game-tying touchdown in the game's final moments, but while spiking the ball at the Dolphins' 32-yard line to set up one more opportunity, the clock ran out.

Alex Van Pelt was 21–34 for 309 yards with 3 touchdowns and an interception for his second consecutive 300 yard game. Eric Moulds caught 6 of his passes for 196 yards and 2 touchdowns.

==== Week 12: at San Francisco 49ers ====
	1	2	3	4	Total
Bills	0	0	0	0	**0**
**49ers**	0	14	7	14	**35**

at 3Com Park, San Francisco, California

- Date: December 2, 2001
- Game time: 5:30 p.m. PST (8:30 p.m. EST)
- Weather: Rain, 45 °F (7.2 °C), wind 25 mph (40 km/h; 22 kn)
- TV: ESPN
- Announcers: Mike Patrick, Joe Theismann, Paul Maguire, and Suzy Kolber
- Referee: Ed Hochuli

After three consecutive competitive games against teams that finished with winning records, the Bills were completely dominated by the 49ers in a Sunday Night game in San Francisco. In the second quarter, 49ers running back Garrison Hearst opened the scoring with a 1-yard touchdown run, followed by Jeff Garcia finding receiver Tai Streets for a 23-yard touchdown to make the score 14–0 49ers at halftime. The Bills' misery continued in the third quarter as Garcia found Terrell Owens for a 17-yard touchdown pass to make the score 21–0 at the end of three quarters. Even fullback Fred Beasley and seldom-used running back Paul Smith got in on the fun with touchdowns in the fourth quarter.

The 49ers dominated the Bills in all phases of the game, outgaining the Bills 409–191 with a 230–29 advantage on the ground while controlling the clock for 39:48 to the Bills' 20:12. Alex Van Pelt threw 4 interceptions, while Travis Henry was held to a mere 9 yards rushing.

As a result, the Bills would be eliminated from playoff contention for the second year in a row at 1-10.

==== Week 13: vs. Carolina Panthers ====
	1	2	3	4	Total
Panthers	3	21	0	0	**24**
**Bills**	3	10	6	6	**25**

at Ralph Wilson Stadium, Orchard Park, New York

- Date: December 9, 2001
- Game time: 1:00 p.m. EST
- Weather: Sunny, 40 °F (4.4 °C), humidity 73%, wind 6 mph (9.7 km/h; 5.2 kn)
- TV: FOX (Blacked out locally)
- Announcers: Curt Menefee, Ray Bentley, and Bob Trimble
- Referee: Bill Carollo

The Panthers-Bills matchup was, by record, the worst matchup of the 2001 NFL season, with the teams combining for a record of 4–28. Sure enough, only 44,549 fans were on hand to see the Bills finally end their 6-game losing streak in a sloppy game.

After a 3–3 stalemate in the first quarter, the Panthers built a big lead in the second quarter. Rookie Panthers quarterback Chris Weinke ran in for a 1-yard touchdown, then running back Richard Huntley added a 2-yard touchdown to make the score 17–3 Panthers. After a field goal by the Bills' new kicker Shayne Graham (who replaced Jake Arians starting in the 49ers game), Weinke found tight end Kris Mangum for a 2-yard touchdown to make the score 24–6 Panthers with 36 seconds to go in the half. However, the Bills drove 70 yards down the field in just 30 seconds, scoring on Alex Van Pelt's 7-yard touchdown pass to Peerless Price with 1 second to go in the half. This made the score 24–13 Carolina at the half.

In the third quarter, rookie linebacker Brandon Spoon intercepted a Chris Weinke pass and returned it 44 yards for a touchdown, with a failed two point conversion keeping the score 24–19 Panthers heading into the final quarter. With 8 minutes remaining, Travis Henry ran in for a 1-yard touchdown plunge to give the Bills their first lead of the game, 25–24. The Bills' defense held on a 4th and 2 with 2:24 to go, then Alex Van Pelt completed a pass to Jay Riemersma on a 3rd and 8 for a game-clinching first down.

Travis Henry ran for 101 yards on 27 carries for a touchdown. Former Bills head coach Marv Levy was honored during a halftime ceremony.

==== Week 14: vs. New England Patriots ====
	1	2	3	4	OT	Total
Patriots	3	3	0	3	3	**12**
**Bills**	0	0	3	6	0	**9**

at Ralph Wilson Stadium, Orchard Park, New York

- Date: December 16, 2001
- Game time: 1:00 p.m. EST
- Weather: Cloudy 38 °F (3.3 °C), humidity 89%, Wind 3–10 mph (4.8–16.1 km/h; 2.6–8.7 kn), wind chill 30 °F (−1.1 °C)
- TV: CBS (Blacked out locally)
- Announcers: Don Criqui, Steve Tasker
- Referee: Mike Carey

The Bills' final home game of the year was a defensive slugfest against the Patriots that did not feature a single touchdown. The Patriots led 6–0 at the half after two Adam Vinatieri field goals. In the fourth quarter the Bills took a 9–6 lead after three consecutive Shayne Graham field goals, which Vinatieri answered with a 25-yard field goal with 2:45 remaining to tie the score at 9–9. After neither team was able to move the ball in the final minutes of regulation, the game went into overtime. Perhaps representative of the defensive battle, the game's most memorable play came in the third quarter when Nate Clements blasted Tom Brady on a QB scramble after he found no receivers open, sending his helmet flying in the process.

Defensive theatrics aside, the Patriots got help from a challenge in overtime. Tom Brady completed a pass to wide receiver David Patten, who fumbled upon being tackled by safety Keion Carpenter along the sideline. Initially it was ruled that Nate Clements recovered the fumble for the Bills, but upon being challenged by Bill Belichick, the ball was ruled out of bounds and the Patriots kept the ball. On the next play, former Bill Antowain Smith broke free for a 38-yard run to put the Patriots in the red zone, setting up Adam Vinatieri for a game-winning 23-yard field goal.

==== Week 15: at Atlanta Falcons ====
	1	2	3	4	Total
Bills	7	7	6	10	**30**
**Falcons**	10	3	10	10	**33**

at Georgia Dome, Atlanta, Georgia

- Date: December 23, 2001
- Game time: 1:00 p.m. EST
- Weather: Dome
- TV: CBS
- Announcers: Craig Bolerjack, Trevor Matich
- Referee: Larry Nemmers

In contrast to their previous game with the Patriots, the Bills' contest against the Atlanta Falcons turned into a shootout. The Falcons opened the scoring with running back Maurice Smith running in for a 1-yard touchdown. Just one minute later, the Bills struck back with running back Shawn Bryson, starting in place of Travis Henry, running for a 15-yard touchdown to even the score at 7–7. In the second quarter, Brandon Spoon intercepted a pass by Chris Chandler and returned it 7 yards for his second touchdown in three weeks, and the Bills led 14–13 at halftime.

In the third quarter, the Bills fell behind 16–14 after a Jay Feely field goal, but regained the lead with Shawn Bryson outrunning the Falcons for a 68-yard touchdown to make the score 20–16. However, two touchdown passes by Chris Chandler, the first to receiver Tony Martin for 63 yards and the second to rookie tight end Alge Crumpler for 49 yards, caused the Bills to fall behind 30–20 with 11:56 to go. With 3:55 to go, Shayne Graham kicked a field goal to make the score 30–23, then the Bills used up their three timeouts to force a Falcons punt. Alex Van Pelt drove the Bills 82 yards down the field, then threw a 3-yard touchdown pass to Eric Moulds with just 48 seconds remaining to tie the score at 30–30. However, the Falcons were not content with overtime and went for the win. An illegal formation penalty pushed them back to midfield with 10 seconds remaining, but Chandler completed a 16-yard pass to receiver Brian Finneran and the Falcons called their final timeout with 2 seconds remaining. This set up a long attempt for rookie kicker Jay Feely at 52 yards, but his kick was good as time expired. Feely celebrated by jumping wildly as the Bills walked off the turf with yet another loss in a close game.

Although the Bills outgained the Falcons on the ground 190–67 with Shawn Bryson running for 130 yards and 2 touchdowns on just 16 carries, the Falcons outgained the Bills in net passing 422–208 with Chris Chandler torching the Bills secondary for 431 yards passing.

==== Week 16: at New York Jets ====
	1	2	3	4	Total
**Bills**	0	7	7	0	**14**
Jets	3	3	0	3	**9**

at Giants Stadium, East Rutherford, New Jersey

- Date: December 30, 2001
- Game time: 1:00 p.m. EST
- Weather: Sunny 32 °F (0 °C), humidity 25%, wind 15 mph (24 km/h; 13 kn), wind chill 9 °F (−12.8 °C)
- TV: CBS
- Announcers: Kevin Harlan, Craig James, and Beasley Reece
- Referee: Ed Hochuli

Despite the struggles the Bills faced all season, they were able to play spoiler in a late-season game against the New York Jets, who were fighting for a playoff spot in the crowded AFC race. The game was played on a cold, windy day in New Jersey, but the lack of precipitation was notable for Buffalo fans as their city was being pelted by a raging snowstorm in the days leading up to the game.

Late in the first half, the Bills got on the board with Larry Centers scoring on a 5-yard run with 19 seconds remaining in the half, giving them a 7–6 lead. In the third quarter, the Bills extended their lead with Alex Van Pelt finding Peerless Price for a 22-yard touchdown pass. At the two minute warning, the Jets were at the Bills' 35 yard line needing a touchdown to win down 14–9. However, Phil Hansen (playing in his second-to-last game before retirement) made a big play by tipping a Vinny Testaverde pass and intercepting it, ending the scoring threat. The bills also took advantage of a Craig Yeast fumble on a kickoff return. The Jets used their remaining timeouts to force a three-and-out before the Bills special teams threatened to give away yet another game, with Brian Moorman fumbling the snap on the ensuing punt and the Jets recovering at midfield with 47 seconds left. With one more chance, the Jets advanced to the Bills' 24 yard line when a baffling coaching decision decided the game. Rather than go for a touchdown with 13 seconds left, the Jets called for a short passing play over the middle of the field. Testaverde threw to Curtis Martin, who was tackled by Jay Foreman as the clock continued to run. The Jets were forced to run no huddle for a desperation pass and got a final snap off with less than a second remaining, but with few players on the field focused on the play anyway, Testaverde threw a pass intended for receiver Kevin Swayne that sailed over the end zone to end the game.

Shawn Bryson had his second consecutive 100-yard game by running for 107 yards on 28 carries.

==== Week 17: at Miami Dolphins ====
	1	2	3	4	Total
Bills	0	0	7	0	**7**
**Dolphins**	3	10	0	21	**34**

at Pro Player Stadium, Miami Gardens, Florida

- Date: January 6, 2002
- Game time: 4:15 p.m. EST (Originally scheduled for 1:00 p.m. on September 16, 2001)
- Weather: Sunny 64 °F (17.8 °C), humidity 93%, wind 14 mph (23 km/h; 12 kn)
- TV: CBS
- Announcers: Don Criqui, Steve Tasker, original announcers for September 16, 2001: Kevin Harlan, Craig James, Beasley Reece
- Referee: Tony Corrente

The Bills' woeful season came to a fitting ending against the Dolphins. In this game, Alex Van Pelt played the first quarter and backup Travis Brown, who started the season as the third-string quarterback, played the final three quarters. Wide receiver Reggie Germany injured his neck in the first quarter and did not return.

The Bills fell behind 13–0 at halftime, with Dolphins running back Lamar Smith running for a 6-yard touchdown during that time. After the Bills scored their only points of the game in the third quarter to make the score 13–7, the fourth quarter was a disaster. Jay Fiedler found the receiver James McKnight for a 16-yard touchdown pass, then ran for a 16-yard touchdown on the Dolphins' next possession to make the score 27–7. The Bills' offense struggled, with Alex Van Pelt throwing an interception and Travis Brown throwing two more while the ground game contributed only 39 yards rushing, and their run defense struggled with Lamar Smith gashing and running over the defense for 158 yards rushing. The final play of the game for the Bills came on the final play of the game. Brown was intercepted at the goal line by safety Brock Marion while trying to throw an out pattern, and Marion raced down the sideline untouched for a 100-yard touchdown.

With this loss, the Bills finished their worst season since 1985, with a 3–13 record.

=== Standings ===
AFC East
	W	L	T	PCT	PF	PA	STK
^{(2)} New England Patriots	11	5	0	.688	371	272	W6
^{(4)} Miami Dolphins	11	5	0	.688	344	290	W2
^{(6)} New York Jets	10	6	0	.625	308	295	W1
Indianapolis Colts	6	10	0	.375	413	486	W1
Buffalo Bills	3	13	0	.188	265	420	L1
