= 2004 Buffalo Bills season =

45th season in franchise history; most dominant team to miss playoffs in NFL history

- Owner: Ralph Wilson
- General manager: Tom Donahoe
- Head coach: Mike Mularkey
- Home stadium: Ralph Wilson Stadium

Results
- Record: 9–7
- Division place: 3rd AFC East
- Playoffs: Did not qualify
- Pro Bowlers: DT Sam Adams; OLB Takeo Spikes; CB Nate Clements; KR Terrence McGee

The 2004 Buffalo Bills season was their 45th in the National Football League. The team improved upon their previous season's output of 6–10, finishing 9–7. However, this was the fifth consecutive season in which the team missed the playoffs.

Buffalo started the season with four straight losses. However, they rebounded with nine wins in their next eleven games. Having won six games in a row, they needed a win in the final game of the season against the Pittsburgh Steelers to qualify for the playoffs (they also would've been only the second team in NFL history to make the playoffs after starting 0–4 after the 1992 Chargers). However, despite the Steelers playing their third stringers (which, notably, included Willie Parker, who would have his breakout performance in the game) and having a 17–16 lead in the fourth quarter, Buffalo lost 29–24 and subsequently missed the playoffs. It was the only winning season that Buffalo had in the 2000s (2000–2009) and would be the Bills' last winning season until 2014.

According to Football Outsiders, who tracked every play in the NFL since the early 1990s (until the site's abandonment in 2023), the 2004 Bills were statistically the best NFL team (in their record-keeping history) to have failed to qualify for the playoffs.

The Bills set an NFL record by returning six kicks (3 punts + 3 kickoffs) for touchdowns in 2004.

Their match with the Miami Dolphins in Week 6 is the only time in the NFL since 1968 that the last two winless teams have met each other.

== Offseason ==
=== Free Agency ===
The Bills failed to re-sign guard Ruben Brown and cornerback Antoine Winfield Sr. Both would end up signing with NFC North teams, with Brown signing with the Chicago Bears and Winfield signing with the Minnesota Vikings.

To replace the departed players, the Bills signed former Chicago Bears guard Chris Villarrial and former Philadelphia Eagles cornerback Troy Vincent.

=== NFL draft ===
The Bills drafted future starters Lee Evans from Wisconsin and J. P. Losman from Tulane in the first round of the 2004 Draft. Buffalo also signed undrafted tight end Jason Peters from Arkansas and converted him into a Pro Bowl offensive tackle. Buffalo traded their 2004 second round pick and 2005 first round pick to move into position to draft Losman.

Round	Pick #	Player	Position	College
1	13	Lee Evans	Wide receiver	Wisconsin
1	22	J. P. Losman	Quarterback	Tulane
3	74	Tim Anderson	Defensive tackle	Ohio State
4	109	Tim Euhus	Tight end	Oregon State
7	207	Dylan McFarland	Offensive tackle	Montana
7	214	Jonathan Smith	Wide receiver	Georgia Tech

== Roster ==
2004 Buffalo Bills roster
Quarterbacks (QB): 11 Drew Bledsoe; 7 J. P. Losman; 6 Shane Matthews; Running backs (RB): 46 Dante Brown; 35 Joe Burns; 20 Travis Henry; 21 Willis McGahee; 31 Daimon Shelton FB; 40 Shaud Williams; Wide receivers (WR): 89 Sam Aiken; 83 Lee Evans; 80 Eric Moulds; 82 Josh Reed; 19 Jonathan Smith; Tight ends (TE): 88 Ryan Neufeld; 81 Rod Trafford	Offensive linemen (OL): 75 Jonas Jennings LT; 79 Dylan McFarland RT; 71 Jason Peters LT; 73 Marcus Price RT; 61 Mike Pucillo G; 72 Lawrence Smith G; 70 Trey Teague C; 65 Ross Tucker C; 58 Chris Villarrial G; 68 Mike Williams RT; Defensive linemen (DL): 95 Sam Adams DT; 69 Tim Anderson DT; 97 Justin Bannan DT; 92 Ryan Denney DE; 98 Ron Edwards DT; 90 Chris Kelsay DE; 94 Aaron Schobel DE; 93 Pat Williams DT	Linebackers (LB): 55 Angelo Crowell OLB; 59 London Fletcher MLB; 53 Mario Haggan MLB; 96 Jeff Posey OLB; 51 Takeo Spikes OLB; 57 Josh Stamer OLB; Defensive backs (DB): 26 Rashad Baker FS; 22 Nate Clements CB; 33 Jabari Greer CB; 24 Terrence McGee CB; 36 Lawyer Milloy SS; 25 Pierson Prioleau SS; 43 Izell Reese FS; 28 Kevin Thomas CB; 23 Troy Vincent CB; 27 Coy Wire SS; Special teams (ST): 86 Bradford Banta LS; 9 Rian Lindell K; 8 Brian Moorman P	Practice squad: 60 Jasen Esposito C; 18 Drew Haddad WR; 41 Luke Lawton FB; 99 Uyi Osunde DE; 74 David Pruce OT; 66 Lauvale Sape DT; 64 Ben Sobieski G (IR); 52 Daryl Towns LB; 17 Kahlil Hill WR; Reserve: 84 Mark Campbell TE (IR); 54 Jon Dorenbos LS (IR); 87 Tim Euhus TE (IR); 63 Constantin Ritzmann DE (IR); Rookies in italics 53 active, 5 reserve, 8 practice squad

== Regular season ==
=== Schedule ===
Week	Date	Opponent	Result	Record	Venue	Attendance	Recap
1	September 12	Jacksonville Jaguars	**L** 10–13	0–1	Ralph Wilson Stadium	72,389	Recap
2	September 19	at Oakland Raiders	**L** 10–13	0–2	McAfee Coliseum	53,610	Recap
3	Bye						
4	October 3	**New England Patriots**	**L** 17–31	0–3	Ralph Wilson Stadium	72,698	Recap
5	October 10	at **New York Jets**	**L** 14–16	0–4	Giants Stadium	77,976	Recap
6	October 17	**Miami Dolphins**	**W** 20–13	1–4	Ralph Wilson Stadium	72,714	Recap
7	October 24	at Baltimore Ravens	**L** 6–20	1–5	M&T Bank Stadium	69,809	Recap
8	October 31	Arizona Cardinals	**W** 38–14	2–5	Ralph Wilson Stadium	65,887	Recap
9	November 7	**New York Jets**	**W** 22–17	3–5	Ralph Wilson Stadium	72,574	Recap
10	November 14	at **New England Patriots**	**L** 6–29	3–6	Gillette Stadium	68,756	Recap
11	November 21	St. Louis Rams	**W** 37–17	4–6	Ralph Wilson Stadium	72,393	Recap
12	November 28	at Seattle Seahawks	**W** 38–9	5–6	Qwest Field	66,271	Recap
13	December 5	at **Miami Dolphins**	**W** 42–32	6–6	Pro Player Stadium	73,084	Recap
14	December 12	Cleveland Browns	**W** 37–7	7–6	Ralph Wilson Stadium	72,330	Recap
15	December 19	at Cincinnati Bengals	**W** 33–17	8–6	Paul Brown Stadium	65,378	Recap
16	December 26	at San Francisco 49ers	**W** 41–7	9–6	Monster Park	63,248	Recap
17	January 2	Pittsburgh Steelers	**L** 24–29	9–7	Ralph Wilson Stadium	73,414	Recap

Note: Intra-division opponents are in bold text.

=== Game summaries ===
==== Week 1: vs. Jacksonville Jaguars ====
Team	1	2	3	4	Total
• **Jaguars**	0	3	3	7	13
Bills	7	0	0	3	10

- Date: September 12
- Location: Ralph Wilson Stadium • Orchard Park, New York
- Game start: 1:00 p.m. EST
- Game attendance: 72,389
- Game weather: 66 °F (18.9 °C) • Wind 9 mph (14 km/h; 7.8 kn)
- Referee: Ron Winter
- TV announcers (CBS): Don Criqui and Steve Tasker

Scoring summary
1	BUF	Eric Moulds 17 yard pass from Drew Bledsoe (Rian Lindell kick)	Bills 7–0
2	JAC	Josh Scobee 25 yard field goal	Bills 7–3
3	JAC	Josh Scobee 27 yard field goal	Bills 7–6
4	BUF	Rian Lindell 25 yard field goal	Bills 10–6
4	JAC	Ernest Wilford 7 yard pass from Byron Leftwich (Josh Scobee kick)	Jaguars 13–10

== Standings ==
AFC East
	W	L	T	PCT	DIV	CONF	PF	PA	STK
^{(2)} New England Patriots	14	2	0	.875	5–1	10–2	437	260	W2
^{(5)} New York Jets	10	6	0	.625	3–3	7–5	333	261	L2
Buffalo Bills	9	7	0	.563	3–3	5–7	395	284	L1
Miami Dolphins	4	12	0	.250	1–5	2–10	275	354	L1

AFC
#	Team	Division	W	L	T	PCT	DIV	CONF	SOS	SOV	STK
Division leaders
1	Pittsburgh Steelers	North	15	1	0	.938	5–1	11–1	.484	.479	W14
2	New England Patriots	East	14	2	0	.875	5–1	10–2	.492	.478	W2
3 (Note: Indianapolis clinched the AFC #3 seed instead of San Diego based upon head-to-head victory.)	Indianapolis Colts	South	12	4	0	.750	5–1	8–4	.500	.458	L1
4	San Diego Chargers	West	12	4	0	.750	5–1	9–3	.477	.411	W1
Wild cards
5 (Note: New York Jets clinched the AFC #5 seed instead of Denver based upon better record against common opponents (New York Jets were 5–0 to Denver’s 3–2 against San Diego, Cincinnati, Houston, and Miami).)	New York Jets	East	10	6	0	.625	3–3	7–5	.523	.406	L2
6	Denver Broncos	West	10	6	0	.625	3–3	7–5	.484	.450	W2
Did not qualify for the postseason
7 (Note: Jacksonville and Baltimore finished ahead of Buffalo because they each defeated Buffalo head-to-head.) (Note: Jacksonville finished ahead of Baltimore based upon better record against common opponents (Jacksonville were 3–2 against Baltimore’s 2–3 versus Pittsburgh, Indianapolis, Buffalo and Kansas City).)	Jacksonville Jaguars	South	9	7	0	.563	2–4	6–6	.527	.479	W1
8	Baltimore Ravens	North	9	7	0	.563	3–3	6–6	.551	.472	W1
9	Buffalo Bills	East	9	7	0	.563	3–3	5–7	.512	.382	L1
10	Cincinnati Bengals	North	8	8	0	.500	2–4	4–8	.543	.453	W2
11 (Note: Houston finished ahead of Kansas City based upon head-to-head victory.)	Houston Texans	South	7	9	0	.438	4–2	6–6	.504	.402	L1
12	Kansas City Chiefs	West	7	9	0	.438	3–3	6–6	.551	.509	L1
13 (Note: Oakland finished ahead of Tennessee based upon head-to-head victory.)	Oakland Raiders	West	5	11	0	.313	1–5	3–9	.570	.450	L2
14	Tennessee Titans	South	5	11	0	.313	1–5	3–9	.512	.463	W1
15 (Note: Miami finished ahead of Cleveland based upon head-to-head victory.)	Miami Dolphins	East	4	12	0	.250	1–5	2–10	.555	.438	L1
16	Cleveland Browns	North	4	12	0	.250	1–5	3–9	.590	.469	W1
Tiebreakers (Note: When breaking ties for three or more teams under the NFL's rules, they are first broken within divisions, then comparing only the highest-ranked remaining team from each division.)
