= Terrence McGee =

American football player (born 1980)

No. 24
- Positions: Cornerback, return specialist

Personal information
- Born: October 14, 1980 (age 46); Athens, Texas, U.S.
- Listed height: 5 ft 9 in (1.75 m)
- Listed weight: 205 lb (93 kg)

Career information
- High school: Athens
- College: Northwestern State
- NFL draft: 2003: 4th round, 111th overall pick

Career history
- Buffalo Bills (2003–2012)

Awards and highlights
- 2× Second-team All-Pro (2004, 2005); Pro Bowl (2004)

Career NFL statistics
- Total tackles: 521
- Forced fumbles: 3
- Pass deflections: 99
- Interceptions: 17
- Defensive touchdowns: 2
- Return yards: 5,450
- Return touchdowns: 5
- Stats at Pro Football Reference

Terrence Dewayne McGee (born October 14, 1980) is an American former professional football player who was a cornerback and return specialist for the Buffalo Bills of the National Football League (NFL). He played college football for the Northwestern State Demons and was selected by the Bills in the fourth round of the 2003 NFL draft. During his career, McGee was considered a versatile threat for his kick return skills as well as his defensive play.

== Early life and college ==
Terrence McGee grew up in Athens, Texas with his mother and brother, the latter of whom has been incarcerated since 1993. One of his hobbies outside of playing football included drawing with charcoal.

McGee attended Northwestern State University, where he played on the football team for four years. He saw sporadic snaps at cornerback in his freshman season before taking on punt return duty the following season, setting the NCAA FCS record with a 23.7 yard average on returns that year with three return touchdowns as a sophomore and earning All-America honors. As the Demons made the FCS playoffs in two consecutive years, McGee became one of the top FCS cornerbacks and even played safety and receiver his final year. He broke up 44 passes and collected 11 interceptions during his college career.

== Professional career ==
Pre-draft measurables
Height	Weight	Arm length	Hand span	40-yard dash	10-yard split	20-yard split	20-yard shuttle	Three-cone drill	Vertical jump	Broad jump	Bench press
5 ft 9 in (1.75 m)	201 lb (91 kg)	30 1/4 in (0.77 m)	9 1/8 in (0.23 m)	4.57 s	1.60 s	2.66 s	4.09 s	6.88 s	37 in (0.94 m)	10 ft 6 in (3.20 m)	15 reps
All values from NFL Combine.

McGee was selected by the Buffalo Bills in the fourth round of the 2003 NFL draft. In his rookie season, McGee intercepted two passes and forced a fumble as a part-time player.

After the departure of Antoine Winfield, the Bills acquired CB Troy Vincent who was injured and replaced. McGee was inserted as a starting cornerback alongside Nate Clements. During the 2004 season, McGee returned three kickoffs for touchdowns, leading Buffalo as it totaled six total kick return touchdowns on the year, which remains an NFL record.

On Christmas Eve 2005 against the Cincinnati Bengals, he became the first player to score touchdowns on an interception and a kick return in the same game. In 2006, he ran a fumble back for a touchdown in a 17–16 loss against the Indianapolis Colts.

McGee exhibited his speed in a Monday Night game against the Dallas Cowboys in 2007. Six minutes into the third quarter, McGee returned a kickoff 103 yards for a touchdown.

McGee signed a contract extension in September 2009. On December 22, 2009, McGee was placed on Injured Reserve due to a shoulder injury.

On February 14, 2013, McGee was cut by the Bills after a few more injury-plagued seasons and he retired shortly afterwards. He played in 122 games, starting 90 of them, and retains numerous cornerback and kick return records for the franchise to this day, making the Pro Bowl once and being named an All-Pro twice.

=== Bills franchise records ===
- Most career kickoff return yards (5,450)
- Most career kickoff return touchdowns (5)
- Longest Kickoff return touchdown: 104
- Most career fumble return yards (106)
- Most passes defended (99)

== NFL career statistics ==
Legend
	Led the league
**Bold**	Career high

Year	Team	Games		Tackles					Interceptions					Fumbles			
Year	Team	GP	GS	Cmb	Solo	Ast	Sck	TFL	Int	Yds	TD	Lng	PD	FF	FR	Yds	TD
2003	BUF	14	2	34	29	5	1.0	0	2	5	0	3	6	**1**	0	0	0
2004	BUF	**16**	13	**92**	**75**	**17**	**2.0**	**4**	3	21	0	21	15	0	1	38	0
2005	BUF	15	14	73	60	13	0.0	1	**4**	**97**	**1**	**46**	15	**1**	**2**	0	0
2006	BUF	15	14	77	64	13	0.0	3	0	0	0	0	11	**1**	1	**68**	**1**
2007	BUF	15	**15**	77	67	10	0.0	2	**4**	4	0	2	**21**	0	0	0	0
2008	BUF	14	13	66	61	5	0.0	3	3	36	0	36	18	0	0	0	0
2009	BUF	11	10	48	40	8	0.0	1	1	3	0	3	7	0	0	0	0
2010	BUF	9	3	18	13	5	0.0	1	0	0	0	0	2	0	0	0	0
2011	BUF	6	6	28	26	2	0.0	1	0	0	0	0	2	0	0	0	0
2012	BUF	7	0	8	6	2	0.0	0	0	0	0	0	2	0	0	0	0
		122	90	521	441	80	3.0	16	17	166	1	46	99	3	4	106	1

== Personal life ==
In 2010, McGee donated $25,000 to the Northwestern State athletic department, which at the time was the largest single donation by a former NSU player still professionally active.

Along with prominent local figures and fellow Bills alumni Fred Jackson and Brian Moorman, he operates SEAR, a high-end steakhouse in downtown Buffalo.
