= Butler, Alabama =

City in and county seat of Choctaw County, Alabama

- Town
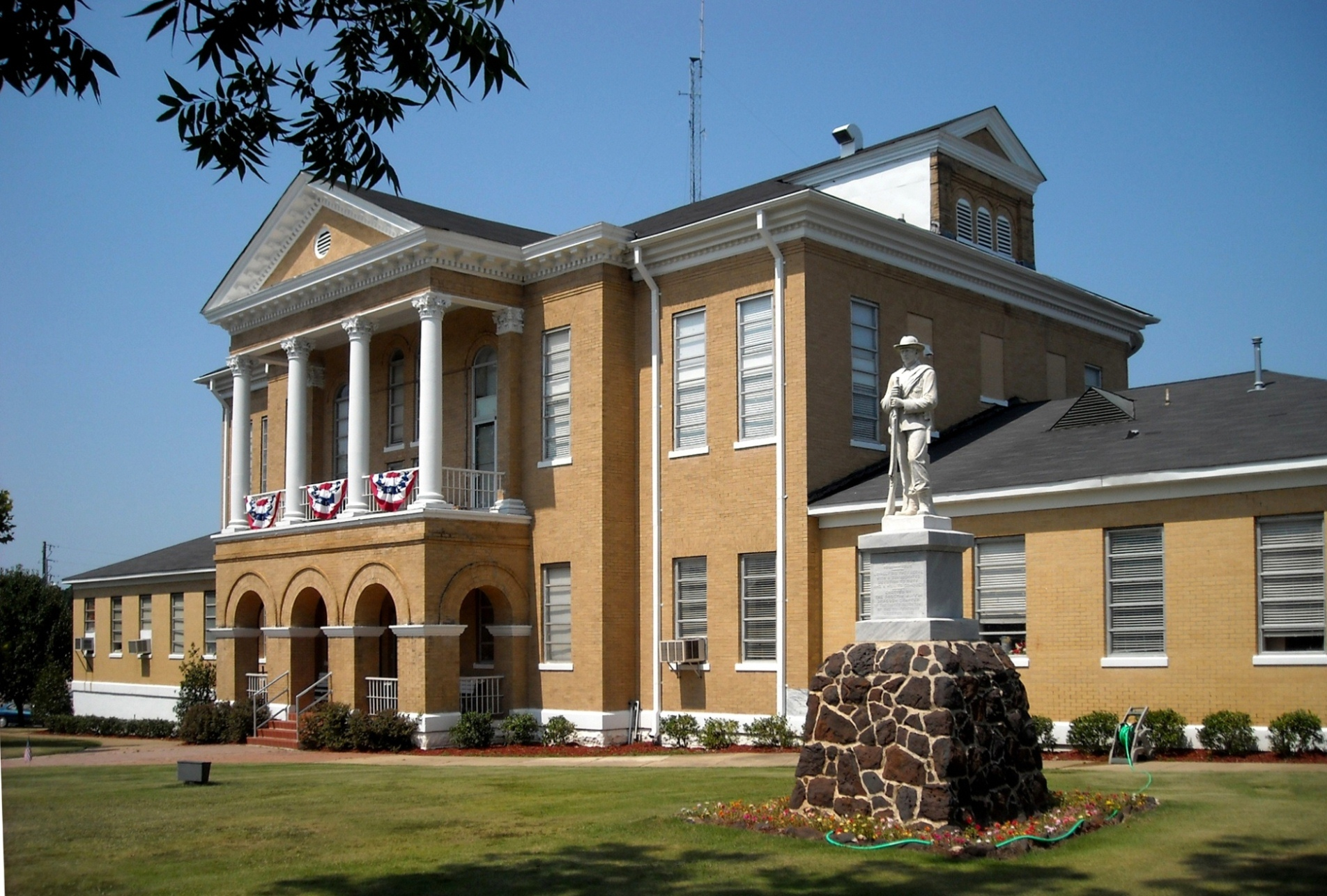
- Choctaw County Courthouse and Confederate monument in Butler

- Location of Butler in Choctaw County, Alabama.
- Coordinates: 32°06′30″N 88°13′14″W
- Country: United States
- State: Alabama
- County: Choctaw

Area
  - Total: 6.75 sq mi (17.48 km^{2})
  - Land: 6.75 sq mi (17.48 km^{2})
  - Water: 0 sq mi (0.00 km^{2})
- Elevation: 151 ft (46 m)

Population (2020)
  - Total: 1,871
  - Density: 277.2/sq mi (107.01/km^{2})
- Time zone: UTC-6 (Central (CST))
  - Summer (DST): UTC-5 (CDT)
- ZIP code: 36904
- Area codes: 205, 659
- FIPS code: 01-11032
- GNIS feature ID: 2405351
- Website: www.butleralabama.org

Butler is a town in and the county seat of Choctaw County, Alabama, United States. As of the 2020 census, Butler had a population of 1,871.

== History ==
When Choctaw County was formed in 1847, Butler was created as the county seat. The town was located and settled in 1848. It is named in honor of Colonel Pierce Butler, a soldier killed in the Mexican–American War.

== Geography ==
Butler is located in north-central Choctaw County.

According to the United States Census Bureau, the town had a total area of 5.6 square miles (14.4 km^{2}), all land.

=== Climate ===
According to the Köppen climate classification, Butler has a humid subtropical climate (abbreviated Cfa).

Climate data for Butler, 1991–2020 simulated normals (161 ft elevation)
Month	Jan	Feb	Mar	Apr	May	Jun	Jul	Aug	Sep	Oct	Nov	Dec	Year
Mean daily maximum °F (°C)	57.6 (14.2)	61.9 (16.6)	70.0 (21.1)	77.2 (25.1)	84.2 (29.0)	89.8 (32.1)	92.5 (33.6)	92.3 (33.5)	87.4 (30.8)	78.4 (25.8)	67.5 (19.7)	59.7 (15.4)	76.5 (24.7)
Daily mean °F (°C)	46.0 (7.8)	49.6 (9.8)	56.8 (13.8)	63.9 (17.7)	72.1 (22.3)	78.6 (25.9)	81.5 (27.5)	81.1 (27.3)	75.9 (24.4)	65.1 (18.4)	54.1 (12.3)	47.8 (8.8)	64.4 (18.0)
Mean daily minimum °F (°C)	34.3 (1.3)	37.4 (3.0)	43.7 (6.5)	50.7 (10.4)	59.9 (15.5)	67.6 (19.8)	70.5 (21.4)	69.8 (21.0)	64.2 (17.9)	51.8 (11.0)	40.8 (4.9)	36.1 (2.3)	52.2 (11.3)
Average precipitation inches (mm)	5.58 (141.75)	5.37 (136.46)	5.86 (148.88)	5.00 (127.01)	4.22 (107.11)	5.17 (131.38)	5.56 (141.23)	5.19 (131.88)	3.73 (94.77)	3.71 (94.25)	4.28 (108.66)	5.39 (136.80)	59.06 (1,500.18)
Average dew point °F (°C)	36.7 (2.6)	39.7 (4.3)	45.1 (7.3)	52.3 (11.3)	61.3 (16.3)	68.5 (20.3)	71.8 (22.1)	70.9 (21.6)	65.8 (18.8)	55.0 (12.8)	44.6 (7.0)	39.7 (4.3)	54.3 (12.4)
Source: Prism Climate Group

== Demographics ==
Historical population
Census	Pop.	Note	%±
1880	194		—
1930	501		—
1940	670		33.7%
1950	659		−1.6%
1960	1,765		167.8%
1970	2,064		16.9%
1980	1,882		−8.8%
1990	1,872		−0.5%
2000	1,952		4.3%
2010	1,894		−3.0%
2020	1,871		−1.2%
U.S. Decennial Census; 2013 Estimate

=== Racial and ethnic composition ===
Butler town, Alabama – Racial and ethnic composition Note: the US Census treats Hispanic/Latino as an ethnic category. This table excludes Latinos from the racial categories and assigns them to a separate category. Hispanics/Latinos may be of any race. Race and ethnicity were not surveyed for populations under 2,500 in 1980 and under 1,000 in 1990.
Race / Ethnicity (NH = Non-Hispanic)	Pop 1990	Pop 2000	Pop 2010	Pop 2020	% 1990	% 2000	% 2010	% 2020
White alone (NH)	1,616	1,581	1,349	1,185	86.32%	80.99%	71.22%	63.34%
Black or African American alone (NH)	245	349	505	594	13.09%	17.88%	26.66%	31.75%
Native American or Alaska Native alone (NH)	1	5	4	5	0.05%	0.26%	0.21%	0.27%
Asian alone (NH)	3	0	4	17	0.16%	0.00%	0.21%	0.91%
Native Hawaiian or Pacific Islander alone (NH)	x	0	0	0	x	0.00%	0.00%	0.00%
Other race alone (NH)	0	0	4	2	0.00%	0.00%	0.21%	0.11%
Mixed race or Multiracial (NH)	x	5	14	31	x	0.26%	0.74%	1.66%
Hispanic or Latino (any race)	7	12	14	37	0.37%	0.61%	0.74%	1.98%
Total	1,872	1,952	1,894	1,871	100.00%	100.00%	100.00%	100.00%

=== 2020 census ===
As of the 2020 census, Butler had a population of 1,871. The median age was 43.1 years. 22.1% of residents were under the age of 18 and 22.7% of residents were 65 years of age or older. For every 100 females there were 86.9 males, and for every 100 females age 18 and over there were 80.3 males age 18 and over.

0.0% of residents lived in urban areas, while 100.0% lived in rural areas.

There were 838 households in Butler, of which 28.0% had children under the age of 18 living in them. Of all households, 36.2% were married-couple households, 22.4% were households with a male householder and no spouse or partner present, and 38.5% were households with a female householder and no spouse or partner present. About 37.9% of all households were made up of individuals and 16.4% had someone living alone who was 65 years of age or older.

There were 998 housing units, of which 16.0% were vacant. The homeowner vacancy rate was 2.8% and the rental vacancy rate was 17.8%.

=== 2010 census ===
As of the census of 2010, there were 1,894 people, 826 households, and 488 families residing in the city. The population density was 340 inhabitants per square mile (130/km^{2}). There were 958 housing units at an average density of 171 per square mile (66/km^{2}). The racial makeup of the city was 71.4% White, 26.7% Black or African American, 0.2% Native American, and 0.7% from two or more races. 0.7% of the population were Hispanic or Latino of any race.

There were 826 households, out of which 25.7% had children under the age of 18 living with them, 39.5% were married couples living together, 17.3% had a female householder with no husband present, and 40.9% were non-families. 37.8% of all households were made up of individuals, and 16.5% had someone living alone who was 65 years of age or older. The average household size was 2.14 and the average family size was 2.84.

In the city the population was spread out, with 22.0% under the age of 18, 7.7% from 18 to 24, 22.6% from 25 to 44, 23.6% from 45 to 64, and 24.1% who were 65 years of age or older. The median age was 42.5 years. For every 100 females, there were 86.4 males. For every 100 females age 18 and over, there were 87.3 males.

The median income for a household in the city was $43,173, and the median income for a family was $67,031. Males had a median income of $49,194 versus $17,500 for females. The per capita income for the city was $21,284. About 7.8% of families and 10.4% of the population were below the poverty line, including 14.6% of those under age 18 and 10.5% of those age 65 or over.

== Education ==
Public education is provided by the Choctaw County School District.

- Choctaw County High School (grades 7 through 12)
- Choctaw County Elementary School (grades K through 6)

Patrician Academy is a private school (grades pre K through 12) located in Butler.

== Media ==
The Choctaw Sun-Advocate is the county's only print newspaper. The Choctaw Sun was established in 2003, later merging with the historic Choctaw Advocate, established in 1890, to form the Choctaw Sun-Advocate in 2006.

=== Radio ===
- WKLV-FM 93.5 FM K-Love (Contemporary Christian)

WDLG 90.1 FM (Catholic)

== Notable people ==
- Leon Bibb, first African American primetime news anchor in Ohio
- Eric Dubose, Major League Baseball pitcher
- Ty Herndon, country music singer
- Thomas Hopkins, NFL player
- Ced Landrum, Major League Baseball outfielder
- Phillip Lolley, administrator for the football team at Auburn University
- Kendrick Office, NFL player
- Johnny Ruffin, Major League Baseball pitcher
- Donald C. Simmons, Jr., writer, poet and documentary film producer
- George W. Taylor, former U.S. Representative for the 1st District of Alabama
- Brian Witherspoon, National Football League cornerback

== Transportation ==
Intercity bus service is provided by Greyhound Lines.
