= Shawn Powell =

American football player (born 1988)

No. 6, 9
- Position: Punter

Personal information
- Born: November 29, 1988 (age 37); Rome, Georgia, U.S.
- Listed height: 6 ft 4 in (1.93 m)
- Listed weight: 243 lb (110 kg)

Career information
- High school: Darlington (Rome)
- College: Florida State
- NFL draft: 2012: undrafted

Career history
- Buffalo Bills (2012–2013); Cincinnati Bengals (2013)

Awards and highlights
- Consensus All-American (2011); First-team All-ACC (2011)

Career NFL statistics
- Punts: 92
- Punt yards: 4,109
- Punting yard average: 44.7
- Stats at Pro Football Reference

Shawn Powell (born November 29, 1988) is an American former professional football player who was a punter who played for the Buffalo Bills and Cincinnati Bengals of the National Football League (NFL). He played college football for the Florida State Seminoles, earning consensus All-American honors in 2011.

== Professional career ==
Pre-draft measurables
Height	Weight	Arm length	Hand span
6 ft 3 3/4 in (1.92 m)	248 lb (112 kg)	33 in (0.84 m)	9 1/4 in (0.23 m)

=== Buffalo Bills ===
Powell joined the Buffalo Bills as an undrafted free agent in 2012 partway through the season after releasing Brian Moorman. He was released on October 4, 2013, after struggling in a Thursday Night Football game against the Cleveland Browns, with Moorman being brought back in to replace him. Powell played 18 career games with Buffalo, averaging 44.7 gross yards per kick over 100 kicks (38.3-yard net average per kick) with 33 landing inside the 20-yard line.

=== Cincinnati Bengals ===
The Cincinnati Bengals signed Powell on December 17 after Kevin Huber was injured. He was released two weeks later after punting the football only 10 yards in a game against the Baltimore Ravens.
