= Alex Van Pelt =

American football player and coach (born 1970)

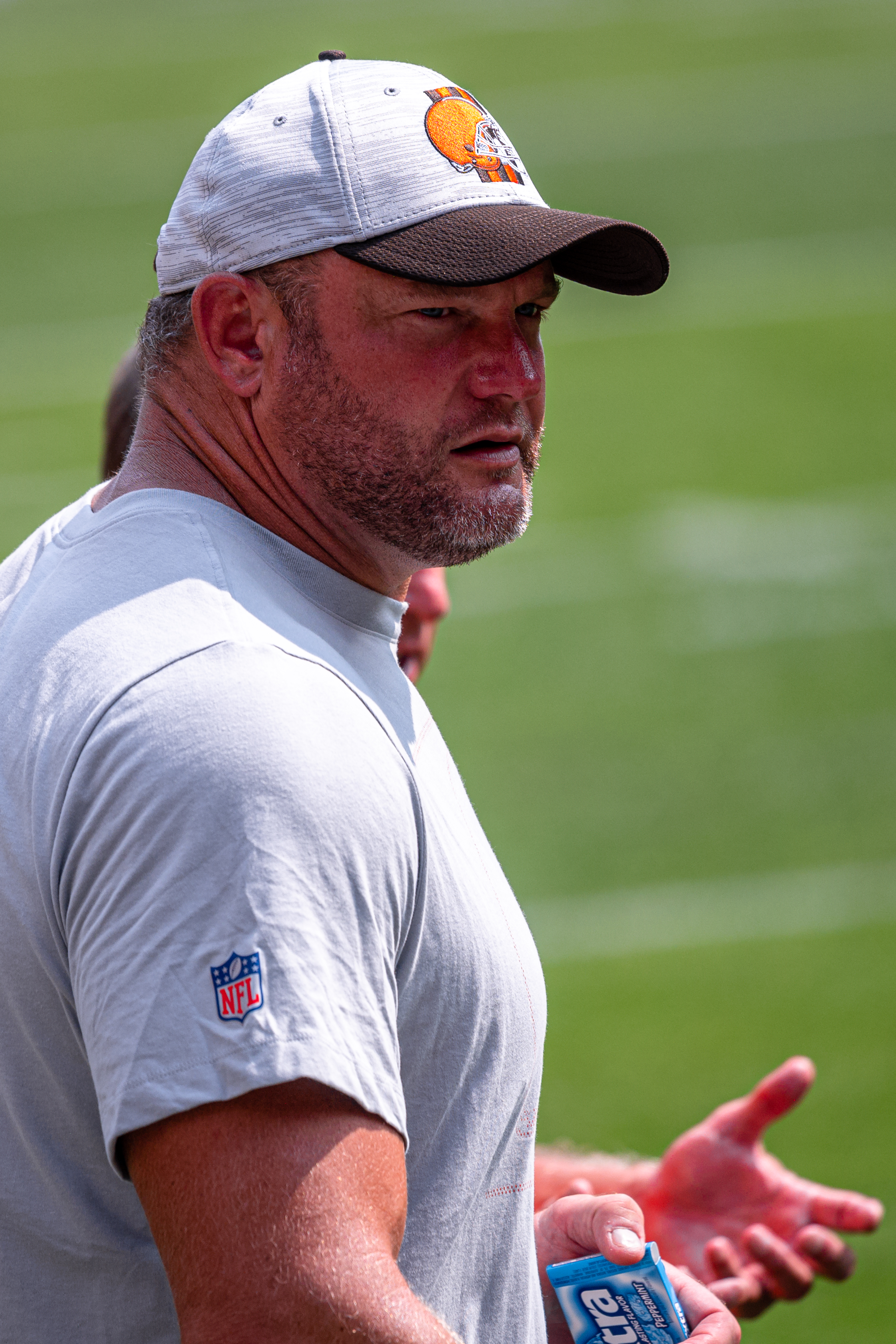
- Van Pelt with the Cleveland Browns in 2021

Atlanta Falcons
- Title: Quarterbacks coach

Personal information
- Born: May 1, 1970 (age 56); Pittsburgh, Pennsylvania, U.S.
- Listed height: 6 ft 1 in (1.85 m)
- Listed weight: 220 lb (100 kg)

Career information
- Position: Quarterback (No. 10)
- High school: Winston Churchill (San Antonio, Texas)
- College: Pittsburgh
- NFL draft: 1993: 8th round, 216th overall pick

Career history

Playing
- Pittsburgh Steelers (1993)*; Kansas City Chiefs (1993); Buffalo Bills (1994–2003)
- * Offseason or practice squad member only

Coaching
- Frankfurt Galaxy (2005) Quarterbacks coach; University at Buffalo (2005) Volunteer quarterbacks coach; Buffalo Bills (2006–2009); Offensive quality control coach (2006–2007); Quarterbacks coach (2008); Offensive coordinator & quarterbacks coach (2009); Tampa Bay Buccaneers (2010–2011) Quarterbacks coach; Green Bay Packers (2012–2017); Running backs coach (2012–2013); Quarterbacks coach (2014–2017); Cincinnati Bengals (2018–2019) Quarterbacks coach; Cleveland Browns (2020–2023); Offensive coordinator (2020–2022); Offensive coordinator & quarterbacks coach (2023); New England Patriots (2024) Offensive coordinator; Los Angeles Rams (2025) Senior offensive assistant; Atlanta Falcons (2026–present) Quarterbacks coach

Awards and highlights
- 2× Second-team All-East (1989, 1990)

Career NFL statistics
- Passing attempts: 477
- Passing completions: 262
- Completion percentage: 54.9%
- TD–INT: 16–24
- Passing yards: 2,985
- Passer rating: 64.1
- Stats at Pro Football Reference
- Coaching profile at Pro Football Reference

Gregory Alexander Van Pelt (born May 1, 1970) is an American professional football coach and former quarterback who is currently the quarterbacks coach for the Atlanta Falcons of the National Football League (NFL). He played in the NFL primarily with the Buffalo Bills. Van Pelt previously served as an assistant coach for the Bills, Cincinnati Bengals, Green Bay Packers, Tampa Bay Buccaneers, Cleveland Browns, New England Patriots, and Los Angeles Rams.

== Playing career ==
=== College ===
Van Pelt attended the University of Pittsburgh, where he was a four-year starting quarterback for the Panthers. When he graduated, Van Pelt broke school career passing records previously set by Dan Marino, holding records for most career passing yards, completions, and attempts in Pitt history. His single-season mark of 3,163 passing yards in 1992 was broken in 2003 by Rod Rutherford.

- 1989: 192/347 for 2,881 yards with 17 touchdowns vs 12 interceptions. Ran for 4 touchdowns.
- 1990: 201/351 for 2,427 yards with 14 touchdowns vs 17 interceptions. Ran for 2 touchdowns.
- 1991: 227/398 for 2,796 yards with 15 touchdowns vs 14 interceptions. Ran for 1 touchdown.
- 1992: 245/407 for 3,163 yards with 20 touchdowns vs 17 interceptions.

=== Professional ===
Pre-draft measurables
Height	Weight	Arm length	Hand span	40-yard dash	10-yard split	20-yard split	Vertical jump
6 ft 0 in (1.83 m)	212 lb (96 kg)	31 7/8 in (0.81 m)	9 3/4 in (0.25 m)	4.97 s	1.68 s	2.86 s	30.5 in (0.77 m)
All values from NFL Combine

Van Pelt was an eighth round draft pick of his hometown franchise Pittsburgh Steelers, but was released during training camp. Van Pelt spent three games with the Kansas City Chiefs late in the 1993 NFL season following a hamstring injury to Joe Montana. He was re-signed by the Chiefs prior to the 1994 NFL season, but was released during training camp. He was signed by the Buffalo Bills later in the 1994 season following a knee injury sustained by Jim Kelly and spent the remainder of his career as a backup with the Bills.

Van Pelt's first NFL win as a starter would come on November 2, 1997, against fellow Pitt alum Dan Marino and the Miami Dolphins, playing well enough to justify a contract extension that would allow the Bills to release Todd Collins. In 2001, he started eight games in relief of the injured Rob Johnson, going 2–6. Van Pelt would not start any games after 2001 due to a Bills trade with the New England Patriots for Drew Bledsoe, who became the full-time starting quarterback. Van Pelt remained with the team as Bledsoe's backup for the next two seasons before retiring.

In his career, Van Pelt totaled 16 touchdowns and 24 interceptions on 477 pass attempts in 31 career appearances and 11 starts.

== Broadcasting career ==
After retiring from football in 2004, Van Pelt was John Murphy's partner on Bills Radio Network broadcasts. He did color commentary for the radio broadcast of all Bills games during the 2004 season.

== Coaching career ==
=== Frankfurt Galaxy ===
Van Pelt began his coaching career in 2005 as the quarterbacks coach for the Frankfurt Galaxy of NFL Europe, the NFL's developmental league, where he was also responsible for all offensive play calling.

=== University at Buffalo ===
After the end of the NFL Europe season, Van Pelt returned to Buffalo, spending the 2005 college football season as a volunteer quarterbacks coach for the University at Buffalo.

=== Buffalo Bills ===
On February 13, 2006, Van Pelt returned to the Bills, this time being hired by head coach Dick Jauron as an offensive quality control coach. On January 16, 2008, the Bills promoted Van Pelt to quarterbacks coach. On September 4, 2009, he was promoted again to offensive coordinator after Turk Schonert was abruptly fired just 10 days before the season opener.

On January 4, 2010, Van Pelt, along with the rest of the Bills coaching staff, was fired following a 6–10 season.

=== Tampa Bay Buccaneers ===
Van Pelt was hired by the Tampa Bay Buccaneers as the quarterbacks coach on February 1, 2010. When Buccaneers head coach Raheem Morris was fired on January 2, 2012, the whole staff was let go as well.

=== Green Bay Packers ===
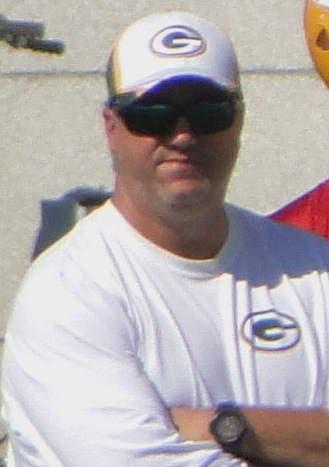
Van Pelt at Packers training camp in 2014

Van Pelt was hired by the Packers as the running backs coach, reuniting him with his longtime friend, head coach Mike McCarthy, on February 13, 2012. On February 7, 2014, Van Pelt was promoted to quarterbacks coach. He left the team when his contract expired on January 3, 2018.

=== Cincinnati Bengals ===
On January 12, 2018, Van Pelt was hired by the Cincinnati Bengals as their quarterbacks coach.

=== Cleveland Browns ===
On January 29, 2020, Van Pelt was hired by the Cleveland Browns as their offensive coordinator under new head coach Kevin Stefanski. Stefanski missed the Wild Card Round against the Pittsburgh Steelers on January 10, 2021, and Van Pelt took over as the offensive play caller for the 48–37 road victory.

On February 26, 2023, Van Pelt added the role of quarterbacks coach to his title. On January 17, 2024, Van Pelt was fired by the Browns following the team's 45–14 loss to the Houston Texans in the AFC playoffs.

=== New England Patriots ===
On February 1, 2024, Van Pelt was named the new offensive coordinator for the New England Patriots under new head coach Jerod Mayo. However, Mayo was fired after a 4–13 season in 2024, and Van Pelt was replaced by Josh McDaniels as offensive coordinator after the hiring of new head coach Mike Vrabel.

=== Los Angeles Rams ===
On February 24, 2025, the Los Angeles Rams announced the hiring of Van Pelt as a senior offensive assistant for head coach Sean McVay.

=== Atlanta Falcons ===
On January 31, 2026, Van Pelt was hired to serve as the quarterbacks coach of the Atlanta Falcons, reuniting him with head coach Kevin Stefanski, for whom he served as the offensive coordinator in Cleveland.

== NFL career statistics ==
Legend
**Bold**	Career high

=== Regular season ===
Year	Team	Games			Passing									Rushing					Sacks		Fumbles	
Year	Team	GP	GS	Record	Cmp	Att	Pct	Yds	Avg	Lng	TD	Int	Rtg	Att	Yds	Avg	Lng	TD	Sck	Yds	Fum	Lost
1995	BUF	1	0	–	10	18	55.6	106	5.9	19	2	**0**	**110.0**	0	0	–	0	0	0	0	0	0
1996	BUF	1	0	–	2	5	40.0	9	1.8	5	0	**0**	47.9	3	-5	-1.7	-1	0	0	0	0	0
1997	BUF	6	3	1–2	60	124	48.4	684	5.5	39	2	10	37.2	11	**33**	**3.0**	9	**1**	4	33	3	0
1998	BUF	1	0	–	0	0	–	0	0.0	0	0	**0**	–	1	-1	-1.0	-1	0	0	0	0	0
1999	BUF	1	0	–	1	1	**100.0**	9	**9.0**	9	0	**0**	104.2	1	-1	-1.0	-1	0	0	0	0	0
2000	BUF	1	0	–	4	8	50.0	67	8.4	36	0	**0**	78.6	0	0	–	0	0	0	0	0	0
2001	BUF	12	8	2–6	**178**	**307**	58.0	**2,056**	6.7	**80**	**12**	11	76.4	**12**	**33**	2.8	**15**	0	**14**	**73**	**5**	**4**
2002	BUF	2	0	–	2	2	**100.0**	5	2.5	4	0	**0**	79.2	0	0	–	0	0	0	0	0	0
2003	BUF	6	0	–	5	12	41.7	49	4.1	14	0	3	14.2	4	-6	-1.5	-1	0	1	7	0	0
Career		31	11	3–8	262	477	54.9	2,985	6.3	80	16	24	64.1	32	53	1.7	15	1	19	113	8	4

=== Postseason ===
Year	Team	Games			Passing									Rushing					Sacks		Fumbles	
Year	Team	GP	GS	Record	Cmp	Att	Pct	Yds	Avg	Lng	TD	Int	Rtg	Att	Yds	Avg	Lng	TD	Sck	Yds	Fum	Lost
1995	BUF	1	0	–	4	10	40.0	27	2.7	17	1	0	81.2	2	8	4.0	4	0	0	0	0	0
1996	BUF	0	0	–	DNP																	
1998	BUF	0	0	–	DNP																	
1999	BUF	0	0	–	DNP																	
Career		1	0	–	4	10	40.0	27	2.7	17	1	0	81.2	2	8	4.0	4	0	0	0	0	0

== Personal life ==
Van Pelt and his wife, Brooke, have three children.

== See also ==
- List of Division I FBS passing yardage leaders
