= Ron Edwards (American football) =

American football player (born 1979)

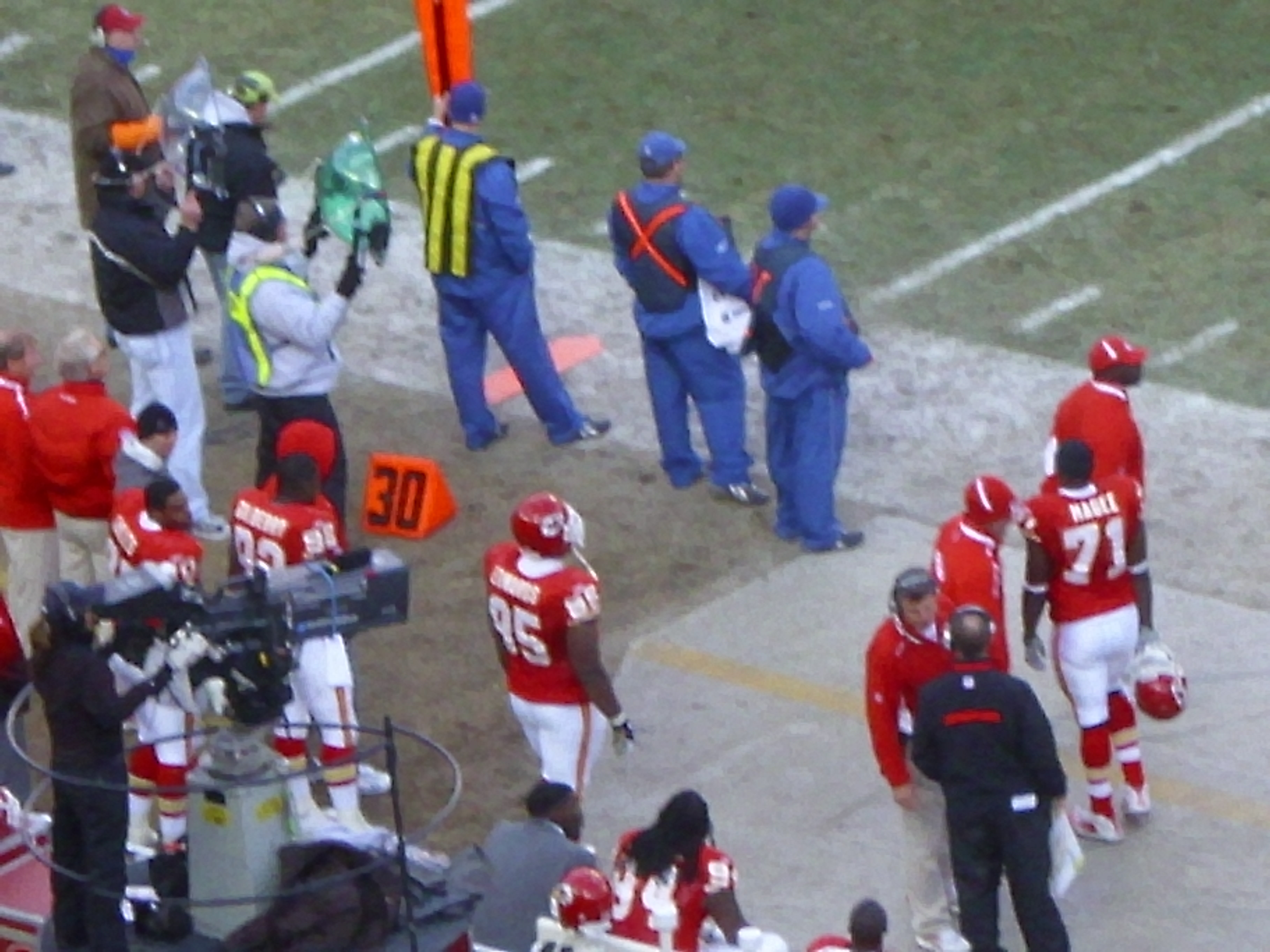
- Edwards (#95) on the sidelines

No. 98, 95, 96
- Position: Defensive tackle

Personal information
- Born: July 12, 1979 (age 47); Columbus, Ohio, U.S.
- Listed height: 6 ft 3 in (1.91 m)
- Listed weight: 315 lb (143 kg)

Career information
- High school: Klein Forest (Houston, Texas)
- College: Texas A&M
- NFL draft: 2001: 3rd round, 76th overall pick

Career history
- Buffalo Bills (2001−2005); Kansas City Chiefs (2006−2010); Carolina Panthers (2011−2012)

Career NFL statistics
- Total tackles: 207
- Sacks: 16.5
- Forced fumbles: 3
- Fumble recoveries: 3
- Pass deflections: 7
- Defensive touchdowns: 1
- Stats at Pro Football Reference

Ronald Harold Edwards (born July 12, 1979) is an American former professional football player who was a defensive tackle in the National Football League (NFL). He started 35 consecutive regular season games at nose guard for Texas A&M University, where he recorded 121 tackles with 10 sacks and 23 stops for losses. He was selected in the 3rd round of the 2001 NFL draft by the Buffalo Bills. He went to Klein Forest High School in Houston, Texas.

== Early life ==
Edwards played high school football at Klein Forest High School which is located in Houston, Texas. He was named a Super Prep All-American. Edwards also was in the high school's track and field team, winning the 5A state championships in shot put in 1997. He placed second in the 5A state championships shot put in 1996.

== College career ==
Edwards chose Texas A&M as his alma mater.

== NFL career statistics ==
Legend
	Led the league
**Bold**	Career high

=== Regular season ===
Year	Team	Games		Tackles					Interceptions					Fumbles			
Year	Team	GP	GS	Cmb	Solo	Ast	Sck	TFL	Int	Yds	TD	Lng	PD	FF	FR	Yds	TD
2001	BUF	7	3	10	7	3	0.0	1	0	0	0	0	0	0	0	0	0
2002	BUF	**16**	**16**	**40**	**25**	**15**	2.5	2	0	0	0	0	0	**2**	**1**	0	**1**
2003	BUF	5	0	7	5	2	0.5	0	0	0	0	0	0	1	0	0	0
2004	BUF	**16**	2	21	13	8	**4.0**	**5**	0	0	0	0	1	0	0	0	0
2005	BUF	4	4	6	4	2	0.0	0	0	0	0	0	0	0	0	0	0
2006	KAN	**16**	**16**	20	15	5	2.5	3	0	0	0	0	1	0	0	0	0
2007	KAN	**16**	15	26	23	3	3.0	**5**	0	0	0	0	1	0	**1**	0	0
2008	KAN	**16**	0	8	8	0	1.0	1	0	0	0	0	0	0	0	0	0
2009	KAN	**16**	14	29	24	5	0.0	3	0	0	0	0	**3**	0	**1**	0	0
2010	KAN	**16**	15	26	15	11	2.0	2	0	0	0	0	1	0	0	0	0
2012	CAR	11	11	14	7	7	1.0	1	0	0	0	0	0	0	0	0	0
Career		139	96	207	146	61	16.5	23	0	0	0	0	7	3	3	0	1

=== Playoffs ===
Year	Team	Games		Tackles					Interceptions					Fumbles			
Year	Team	GP	GS	Cmb	Solo	Ast	Sck	TFL	Int	Yds	TD	Lng	PD	FF	FR	Yds	TD
2006	KAN	**1**	**1**	**3**	0	**3**	0.0	0	0	0	0	0	0	0	0	0	0
2010	KAN	**1**	**1**	**3**	**1**	2	0.0	0	0	0	0	0	0	0	0	0	0
Career		2	2	6	1	5	0.0	0	0	0	0	0	0	0	0	0	0
