= Jake Arians =

American football player (born 1978)

No. 9
- Position: Placekicker

Personal information
- Born: January 26, 1978 (age 48); Blacksburg, Virginia, U.S.
- Listed height: 5 ft 11 in (1.80 m)
- Listed weight: 203 lb (92 kg)

Career information
- High school: Starkville (Starkville, Mississippi)
- College: UAB
- NFL draft: 2000: undrafted

Career history
- Atlanta Falcons (2000)*; Buffalo Bills (2001)
- * Offseason or practice squad member only

Career NFL statistics
- Games played: 10
- Field goals: 12/21
- Field goal %: 57.1%
- Longest field goal: 49
- Points scored: 52
- Stats at Pro Football Reference

Jacob Bruce Arians (born January 26, 1978) is an American former professional football player who was a placekicker in the National Football League (NFL). He played college football for the UAB Blazers.

Arians spent less than one season as the field goal kicker for the Buffalo Bills in 2001, signing with the team as an undrafted free agent that summer to replace longtime kicker Steve Christie, who was among the numerous players who joined the San Diego Chargers in the "Bills West" exodus. He did not handle kickoffs, which were handled by punter Brian Moorman. Arians beat out Jay Taylor for the open position. Due to several missed field goals and a missed extra point, Arians was released near the end of the 2001 season and was replaced by Shayne Graham, after which he never returned to professional football.

He is the son of former Tampa Bay Buccaneers Super Bowl-winning coach and former Arizona Cardinals head coach Bruce Arians. Bruce was the Cleveland Browns offensive coordinator during Jacob's one season in Buffalo, but the teams did not play each other that season.
