= Travis Brown (quarterback) =

American football player (born 1977)

No. 5
- Position: Quarterback

Personal information
- Born: July 17, 1977 (age 49); Phoenix, Arizona, U.S.
- Listed height: 6 ft 3 in (1.91 m)
- Listed weight: 215 lb (98 kg)

Career information
- High school: Moon Valley (Phoenix)
- College: Northern Arizona
- NFL draft: 2000: undrafted

Career history
- Philadelphia Eagles (2000)*; Seattle Seahawks (2000); Buffalo Bills (2001–2003); Indianapolis Colts (2004–2005)
- * Offseason or practice squad member only

Career NFL statistics
- TD–INT: 1-3
- Yards: 361
- QB rating: 59.9
- Stats at Pro Football Reference

Travis Martin Brown (born July 17, 1977) is an American former professional football player who was a quarterback in the National Football League. Brown played college football for the Northern Arizona Lumberjacks. He became a Christ's Church of the Valley campus pastor in Peoria, Arizona.

== Professional career ==
=== Seattle Seahawks ===
Not selected in the 2000 NFL draft, Brown was signed by the Seattle Seahawks in 2000. While with the Seattle Seahawks, Travis played in one regular season game against the Oakland Raiders. In this game he made one pass attempt, which was incomplete. This game was won 27–24.

=== Buffalo Bills ===
Brown was traded to the Buffalo Bills in 2001 and played for the Bills during the 2001, 2002, and 2003 seasons. In 2001 he saw his first significant action in relief of an injured Alex Van Pelt, against the Miami Dolphins. Brown completed 15 passes for 201 yards and 1 touchdown, but it would not be enough to overcome Dolphins, who beat them 34–7. In 2003 Brown would play against the Miami Dolphins again, relieving an ineffective Drew Bledsoe late in the game, where he completed 3 out of 4 passes for 41 yards, and ran for 5 yards. His attempts would prove futile, as the Dolphins prevailed against him yet again, beating the Bills 20–3. Travis Brown also relieved Bledsoe in the next game against the New England Patriots, throwing for 119 yards and being intercepted only once. The New England Patriots prevailed, however, by shutting them out and scoring 31 points of their own.

=== Indianapolis Colts ===
On August 28, 2004, Travis sprained his left knee against the Indianapolis Colts in the preseason. This caused Travis to reach an injury settlement with the Bills that September, which allowed him to be released into free agency. Travis Brown was signed by the Colts, who then released Joe Hamilton.
