= Rob Johnson (American football) =

American football player and coach (born 1973)

No. 11, 7, 17
- Position: Quarterback

Personal information
- Born: March 18, 1973 (age 53); Newport Beach, California, U.S.
- Listed height: 6 ft 4 in (1.93 m)
- Listed weight: 212 lb (96 kg)

Career information
- High school: El Toro (Lake Forest, California)
- College: USC (1991–1994)
- NFL draft: 1995: 4th round, 99th overall pick

Career history

Playing
- Jacksonville Jaguars (1995–1997); Buffalo Bills (1998–2001); Tampa Bay Buccaneers (2002); Washington Redskins (2003); Oakland Raiders (2003); New York Giants (2006)*
- * Offseason or practice squad member only

Coaching
- Mission Viejo High School Diablos (assistant) (2004–present)

Awards and highlights
- Super Bowl champion (XXXVII); First-team All-Pac-10 (1993)

Career NFL statistics
- Passing attempts: 806
- Passing completions: 494
- Completion percentage: 61.3%
- TD–INT: 30–23
- Passing yards: 5,795
- Passer rating: 83.6
- Rushing yards: 877
- Rushing touchdowns: 4
- Stats at Pro Football Reference

Robert Garland Johnson (born March 18, 1973) is an American former professional football player who was a quarterback in the National Football League (NFL). He played college football for the USC Trojans and was a fourth-round pick in the 1995 NFL draft by the expansion team Jacksonville Jaguars.

With USC, Johnson won the 1995 Cotton Bowl Classic. In the Jaguars' opening game of 1997, Johnson started for an injured Mark Brunell and had a breakout performance that set a record for the best completion percentage by a debuting starting quarterback. Johnson signed a $25 million contract with the Buffalo Bills the following season and was named starting quarterback by coach Wade Phillips. Johnson had a tumultuous, injury-ridden run with the Bills and a reputation for frequently being sacked (140 in his career, including 49 in 2000), the inspiration for the nickname "Robo-sack". Johnson's injuries and poor performance led Phillips to replace Johnson with the more experienced Doug Flutie as starter. Controversially, Phillips started Johnson over Flutie for the 2000 Wild Card playoff game that the Bills lost to eventual AFC champion Tennessee Titans, after Flutie helped the Bills to an 11–5 record in the 1999 season. Phillips later said that Bills' owner Ralph Wilson had instructed the head coach to start Johnson over Flutie.

After two losing seasons with the Bills, Johnson joined the Tampa Bay Buccaneers for 2002 and won a Super Bowl title with the team as a backup to Brad Johnson (no relation). Rob Johnson played his final games with the Washington Redskins and Oakland Raiders in 2003. He also tried out in 2006 for the New York Giants and in 2008 for the Tennessee Titans. In 2004, Johnson became an assistant football coach at Mission Viejo High School with his brother, both under their father as head coach.

== Early life ==
Johnson was born in Newport Beach, California and graduated from El Toro High School in 1991. In his senior season of 1990, Johnson completed 207 of 303 attempted passes for 2,788 yards and 28 touchdowns. The Los Angeles Times selected Johnson as first-team All-Orange County.

== College career ==
Johnson played college football at the University of Southern California, where he was teammates with Keyshawn Johnson, Curtis Conway, Johnnie Morton, Willie McGinest, and All-American tackle and fellow Jacksonville Jaguars draftee Tony Boselli. Johnson left USC holding virtually every major passing record and spent much of his senior year as a Heisman Trophy candidate. In his final game for the school, Johnson led his team to victory in the 1995 Cotton Bowl Classic, dominating Texas Tech by a final score of 55–14.

- 1992 season: 163/285 for 2,118 yards with 12 TD vs 14 INT.
- 1993 season: 308/449 for 3,630 yards with 29 TD vs 6 INT.
- 1994 season: 186/276 for 2,499 yards with 15 TD vs 6 INT.

== Professional career ==
=== Jacksonville Jaguars ===
==== 1995 ====
In the 1995 NFL draft, the expansion team Jacksonville Jaguars drafted Johnson as the first draft pick of the fourth round (99th overall). As a rookie, Johnson was the second- and third-string quarterback behind Steve Beuerlein. Johnson played in one game in 1995, a 44–0 loss to the Detroit Lions. With 3:57 remaining in the third quarter, Johnson entered the game for Beuerlein. In three drives, Johnson threw one interception and failed at two fourth down conversions. Johnson was 3 for 7 in passing for 24 yards, one interception, and one sack, and he rushed for 17 yards. The Jaguars finished their inaugural season 4–12.

==== 1996 ====
Starting in 1996, Mark Brunell became starting quarterback for the Jaguars. Rob Johnson played in all the preseason games and completed 30 of 43 passes (69.8%) for 336 yards, three touchdowns, and no interceptions. He rushed for 23 yards, including a 7-yard touchdown run against the San Francisco 49ers. Johnson did not play in any regular season or postseason games in 1996. The Jaguars finished the 1996 season 9–7 and lost the AFC championship game to the New England Patriots.

==== 1997 ====
For the final two games of the 1997 preseason, Johnson was the starter in place of an injured Mark Brunell and won both games. Johnson started his first game on Week 1 of 1997 as Brunell was still recovering. In that game on August 31, 1997, Johnson completed 20 of 24 passes for 294 yards and two touchdowns. For the Jaguars' first two possessions, Johnson led 84- and 93-yard touchdown drives. Johnson also ran four times for 31 yards, including a 25-yard touchdown on a scramble. Jaguars receiver Jimmy Smith caught the winning 28-yard touchdown pass from Johnson in the Jaguars' 28–27 victory over the Baltimore Ravens. This performance set the record for the highest completion percentage of any first-time starting quarterback. Twice in the game, Johnson left due to high ankle sprains. Due to his ankle injury, Johnson would miss the next three games. In Week 7 (October 12), Johnson played his next game of the season, a backup role to Brunell in a 38–21 victory over the Philadelphia Eagles. Johnson completed one 10-yard pass and was sacked once for 6 yards. For three more games, Johnson would play in minor roles: a Week 9 (October 26) loss to the Pittsburgh Steelers, a Week 11 (November 9) win over the Kansas City Chiefs, and a Week 17 (December 21) win over the Oakland Raiders for a cumulative five games played in 1997 (including one start). Johnson did not play in the Jaguars' only postseason game, a 17–42 loss to the eventual Super Bowl XXXII champion Denver Broncos in the Wild Card round.

=== Buffalo Bills ===
==== 1998 ====
On February 14, 1998, the Jaguars traded Johnson to the Buffalo Bills in exchange for the Bills' first and fourth round picks in the 1998 NFL draft. Johnson was immediately named the starting quarterback after signing a five-year, $25 million contract with the team. First-year Bills' head coach Wade Phillips proclaimed Johnson's arrival as the start of a "new era" for the franchise.

Yet, Johnson's hold on the starting job was tenuous from his first game. Facing the San Diego Chargers in week 1 of the 1998 season, Johnson left with a concussion. With the Bills trailing 10–0, backup quarterback Doug Flutie led two scoring drives, but the Bills lost 16–14. Over the first four games of the year, Johnson completed 63.2% of his passes with five touchdowns and three interceptions. He was sacked 24 times, as the Bills stumbled to a 1–3 start.

With the Bills facing the Indianapolis Colts in week 5, Johnson suffered a separated rib cartilage during the first quarter and left the game. Appearing in relief, Flutie led the Bills to a 31–24 victory over the Colts with 24 unanswered points in the second half. While Johnson was still recovering from his injury, Flutie led the Bills to four consecutive wins before Phillips officially named him the new starting quarterback on November 5, 1998. Speaking to the media following the announcement, Johnson publicly expressed his displeasure, erroneously saying, "I'm not a backup." Flutie led the Bills to a 10–6 record before losing to the Miami Dolphins in the first round of the playoffs.

==== 1999 ====
Entering training camp for the 1999 season, Phillips named Johnson and Flutie "co-number ones" before ultimately awarding Flutie the starting job. Flutie led the Bills to a 10–5 record before Phillips decided to rest him for the final week of the season. Facing the Indianapolis Colts and the Colts' second-year quarterback and number-one draft pick Peyton Manning, Johnson completed 24 of 32 passes for 287 yards and 2 touchdowns as the Bills won 31–6, ending the Colts' 11-game winning streak. This performance led owner Ralph Wilson to "discuss" the QB position with Phillips, on the day after the game Phillips named Johnson the starter for the Bills' opening round playoff game against the Tennessee Titans.

Facing the Titans on the road, Johnson played poorly, completing only 10 of 22 passes for 131 yards, taking six sacks, and fumbling three times. However, the Bills still led 16–15 after a Steve Christie field goal with 16 seconds remaining. On the ensuing kickoff, however, Titans tight end Frank Wycheck completed a pass that was ultimately ruled to be a lateral to returner Kevin Dyson, who returned the ball for a touchdown and the Titans victory. This play would be known later as "Home Run Throwback" or the "Music City Miracle". The Bills did not make the playoffs after the 1999 season until the 2017 season.

==== 2000 ====
Rob Johnson started the first six games of 2000 and finished those games 3–3 after a 2–0 start as Doug Flutie recovered from a groin injury that forced him to miss much of training camp. The Bills' opening game of the season was against the Tennessee Titans, a rematch of last season's Wild Card playoff game. With nine minutes left in the fourth quarter, Johnson left the game with a leg injury, and Alex Van Pelt took over and set up the winning field goal for a 16–13 Bills victory. Johnson completed 9 of 18 pass attempts for 107 yards and one touchdown and rushed six times for 60 yards. However, Johnson was sacked five times. The following game against the Brett Favre-led Green Bay Packers, Johnson again was sacked five times but led the Bills to a 27–18 victory, on 18-for-26 passing for 259 yards. The Bills lost their next three games. In the week 6 game against the Miami Dolphins, a 13–22 loss, Johnson was sacked five times and finished 11-for-26 for 178 yards before leaving due to tendinitis. Johnson's injury provided the opportunity for Doug Flutie to play for the first time this season, and Johnson had been sacked 25 times by the time of his injury. The Bills snapped the three-game losing streak with a 27–24 overtime win against the San Diego Chargers, but Johnson separated his right shoulder during the first play of the Bills' opening drive in overtime and was expected to miss two to four weeks. Flutie led the winning offensive drive that game. With Johnson out with his shoulder injury, Flutie led the Bills to a near-upset of the then-undefeated Vikings, 31–27, then engineered an upset 20–17 win over the New York Jets and a 16–13 overtime win over the New England Patriots. Johnson returned in Week 11 against the Bears and received some playing time off the bench as Flutie led the Bills to another win.

Despite Flutie's win streak, Johnson was again named the starter heading into the Week 12 game at Kansas City. Johnson threw two touchdowns (albeit one coming after a Chiefs player dropped an interception) and ran for the go-ahead score with 2:58 remaining as the Bills won over the Chiefs, 21–17. After this win, which put the Bills at 7-4 and in playoff contention, Johnson began to struggle. The Bills lost to the Bucs, 31–17, in Tampa Bay in Week 13, despite two touchdown passes from Johnson before being injured again when Bucs linebacker Derrick Brooks threw him to the ground while he miraculously completed a screen pass to running back Shawn Bryson. The following week against the Dolphins, Johnson was only 6-18 for 44 yards with 2 interceptions and was benched late in the game for Flutie as the Bills lost, 33–6. A Week 15 Monday Night loss to the Colts eliminated the Bills from the playoffs, as it gave the Bills their seventh loss of the season, while all teams that made the playoffs in 2000 lost six games or fewer. Early in the Bills's next game against the Patriots, Johnson received a season-ending injury, and Flutie replaced him for the remainder of the season.

The Bills finished the 2000 season 8–8, with a 4–1 record with games started by Flutie and 4–7 under Johnson. After the 2000 season, it was clear that the Bills could not keep both Johnson and Flutie on the same team. Tim Layden reported for the August 6, 2001 issue of Sports Illustrated that Johnson had the highest sack-to-dropback ratio among quarterbacks who threw at least 190 passes in the 2000 season.

==== 2001 ====
After an 0–4 start, Johnson's only win of 2001 came in a Thursday night 13–10 win over the Jacksonville Jaguars, against the team where his career began. Johnson led a late-game drive, setting up a tie-breaking field goal that gave Buffalo its first win of the season. The Bills would lose the next three games, which Johnson started. Johnson broke his collarbone and left the Week 9 (November 11) game against the New England Patriots late in the fourth quarter, and Alex Van Pelt assumed the starting job for the rest of the 2001 season. Johnson finished 2001 134 for 216 in completed passes for 1,465 yards with 5 touchdowns, 7 interceptions, and 31 sacks.

=== Tampa Bay Buccaneers (2002) ===
After a dismal 2001 campaign that saw Johnson miss half the season with a broken clavicle, Johnson signed with the Tampa Bay Buccaneers for the 2002 season. Under new head coach Jon Gruden, the team was looking for a mobile signal caller in the mold of Rich Gannon. For opening week, Gruden named Rob Johnson the backup to starter Brad Johnson (no relation).

Rob Johnson played his first regular season game with Tampa in Week 7 (October 20) against the Philadelphia Eagles after Brad Johnson left due to a rib injury. However, the Buccaneers lost 20-10. However, Rob Johnson led the Buccaneers to a defense-filled 12–9 victory over the Carolina Panthers on Week 8 (October 27). 22-for-33 in passing, Johnson passed for 179 yards but had one interception and 6 sacks. While Brad Johnson was recovering from being poked in the eye, Rob Johnson played for part of the first quarter in the Week 12 (November 24) game against the Green Bay Packers, a game that Tampa won 21–7. Johnson completed 3 out of 5 passes for 60 yards, threw one interception, and had two sacks.

By late November 2002, Rob Johnson had nine sacks in 54 passing plays and a 59.8 quarterback rating, in contrast with Brad Johnson having 16 sacks in 335 attempts. Gruden promoted Shaun King to be Brad Johnson's backup on November 29, making Rob Johnson the third-stringer. In Week 16 (December 23), King played so poorly against the Pittsburgh Steelers, throwing three interceptions (one of which was returned for a touchdown) versus only five completions, that Rob Johnson started the second half. Rob Johnson led the Buccaneers to a late touchdown drive in a 17–7 loss. Johnson had 12-for-18 passing for 159 yards, one touchdown, and 5 sacks.

On Week 17 (December 29), with a first-round playoff bye on the line, Johnson led the Buccaneers to five field goals against the Chicago Bears at the University of Illinois' Memorial Stadium for the franchise's first-ever victory when the kickoff temperature was below freezing. Johnson completed 16 of 25 passes for 134 yards and rushed three times for 29 yards. Like the previous game, Johnson was sacked five times. In the Buccaneers' Divisional playoff game against the San Francisco 49ers, Rob Johnson completed one 21-yard pass and rushed one time for 7 yards in the 31–6 Buccaneers win. During Super Bowl XXXVII, Rob Johnson would watch from the bench as Brad Johnson led the Buccaneers to the NFL title.

=== Washington Redskins (2003) ===
On March 2, 2003, Johnson signed with the Washington Redskins. As a backup to starting quarterback Patrick Ramsey, Johnson played only two games with the Redskins, in Week 6 (October 12) against the Tampa Bay Buccaneers and Week 7 (October 19) against the Buffalo Bills, both against teams for which Johnson used to play. In the Redskins' 13–35 loss to the Buccaneers, Johnson completed 4 of 4 passes for 35 yards and was sacked twice. The following game against the Bills, Johnson took over in the fourth quarter after Ramsey suffered a hand bruise, to a chorus of boos from the crowd at Ralph Wilson Stadium. On his second play of the game, Johnson was sacked by Aaron Schobel, a play that the crowd cheered. Johnson completed only one 4-yard pass out of three passes. On October 22, owner Daniel Snyder terminated Johnson's contract and replaced Johnson with free agent Tim Hasselbeck.

=== Oakland Raiders (2003) ===
On November 6, 2003, Johnson signed with the Oakland Raiders, who were seeking replacements for injured quarterbacks Rich Gannon and Marques Tuiasosopo. Succeeding Rick Mirer, Johnson played in the second half of a Week 16 Monday Night Football game on December 22 hosting the Green Bay Packers. His last pass attempt was directed at the legendary Jerry Rice and was intercepted. Johnson finished the game passing 6-for-13 for 54 yards, one sack, one interception, and 15 rushing yards.

=== Comeback attempts (2006–2008) ===
Following his release from Oakland in 2004, Johnson underwent Tommy John surgery, a procedure more commonly performed on baseball pitchers. A tendon was taken from Johnson's wrist and transplanted into his elbow to replace the injured tendon that resembled "a frayed rope" from overuse. After a year of recovery, Johnson worked out for the Tennessee Titans, but was not signed. Reports suggested his arm strength was still under 50%. In 2006, Johnson was signed by the New York Giants to compete for a roster spot behind starter Eli Manning. Johnson was released before the preseason came to an end. In an NFL.com interview, Johnson vowed to continue his career for as long as he could play at "an NFL level."

In September 2008, Johnson was invited to a Titans workout, along with Joey Harrington and Chris Simms. However, the Titans signed Simms as a backup for veteran Kerry Collins. This was Johnson's last reported NFL workout.

== Post-NFL career ==
Johnson and his family live in Ladera Ranch, California. Since 2004, Johnson has been an assistant football coach at Mission Viejo High School under head coach, father Bob Johnson, and with assistant coach and brother Bret Johnson. The Johnsons also run a camp for high school quarterbacks. In 2012, Johnson joined a series of class-action lawsuits against the NFL contending that the league knew or should have known concussions and repeated head impacts put players at risk of brain disorders later in life.

In a 2015 oral history of the Music City Miracle, Johnson announced his intention to bring his family to a Bills game that season, but admitted to his unpopularity among Bills fans by adding, "The fans might boo me."

== Legacy ==
In 2008, the NFL Network ranked Johnson number eight in the network special Top Ten One-Shot Wonders, citing Johnson's one wonder as his game from Week 1 of 1997. NFL Network also ranked the Doug Flutie/Rob Johnson quarterback controversy with the Buffalo Bills #6 in the special Top Ten QB Controversies the following year. For holding the NFL record for most sacks per passing attempt, Johnson earned the nickname "Robo-sack".

== NFL career statistics ==
Legend
	Led the league
	Won the Super Bowl
**Bold**	Career high

==== Regular season ====
Year	Team	Games			Passing									Rushing					Sacks		Fumbles	
Year	Team	GP	GS	Record	Cmp	Att	Pct	Yds	Y/A	TD	Int	Lng	Rtg	Att	Yds	Lng	Avg	TD	Sck	SckY	Fum	Lost
1995	JAX	1	0	–	3	7	42.9	24	3.4	0	1	19	12.5	3	17	7	5.7	0	1	13	2	1
1996	JAX	2	0	–	0	0	–	0	–	0	0	–	–	0	0	0	–	0	0	0	0	0
1997	JAX	5	1	1–0	22	28	**78.6**	344	**12.3**	2	2	40	111.9	10	34	25	3.4	**1**	6	29	4	2
1998	BUF	8	6	3–3	67	107	62.6	910	8.5	8	3	66	102.9	24	123	**32**	5.1	**1**	29	163	**6**	**5**
1999	BUF	2	1	1–0	25	34	73.5	298	8.8	2	**0**	42	**119.5**	8	61	25	**7.6**	0	1	9	0	0
2000	BUF	12	11	4–7	**175**	**306**	57.2	**2,125**	6.9	**12**	7	**74**	82.2	**42**	**307**	23	7.3	**1**	**49**	**292**	4	2
2001	BUF	8	8	1–7	134	216	62.0	1,465	6.8	5	7	61	76.3	36	241	23	6.7	**1**	31	196	6	5
2002	TB	6	2	**2–0**	57	88	64.8	536	6.1	1	2	23	75.8	14	73	21	5.2	0	19	94	2	2
2003	WAS	2	0	–	5	7	71.4	39	5.6	0	**0**	15	84.8	1	6	6	6.0	0	3	15	0	0
2003	OAK	2	0	–	6	13	46.2	54	4.2	0	1	14	25.8	2	15	14	7.5	0	1	6	0	0
Career		48	29	12–17	494	806	61.3	5,795	7.2	30	23	74	83.6	140	877	32	6.3	4	140	817	24	17

==== Postseason ====
Year	Team	Games			Passing									Rushing					Sacks		Fumbles	
Year	Team	GP	GS	Record	Cmp	Att	Pct	Yds	Y/A	TD	Int	Lng	Rtg	Att	Yds	Lng	Avg	TD	Sck	SckY	Fum	Lost
1996	JAX	0	0	DNP																		
1997	JAX	0	0	DNP																		
1999	BUF	1	1	0–1	**10**	**22**	45.5	**131**	6.0	0	0	**37**	64.8	**3**	**9**	4	3.0	0	**6**	**34**	**3**	**2**
2002	TB	1	0	–	1	1	**100.0**	21	**21.0**	0	0	21	**118.7**	1	7	**7**	**7.0**	0	0	0	0	0
Career		2	1	0–1	11	23	47.8	152	13.8	0	0	37	69.5	4	16	7	4.0	0	6	34	3	2
