= Marques Sullivan =

American football player (born 1978)

No. 74
- Position: Guard

Personal information
- Born: February 2, 1978 (age 48); Chicago, Illinois, U.S.
- Listed height: 6 ft 5 in (1.96 m)
- Listed weight: 325 lb (147 kg)

Career information
- High school: Fenwick (IL)
- College: Illinois
- NFL draft: 2001: 5th round, 144th overall pick

Career history
- Buffalo Bills (2001–2003); New York Giants (2004); New England Patriots (2004)

Awards and highlights
- 2× Second-team All-Big Ten (1999, 2000)

Career NFL statistics
- Games played: 32
- Games started: 22
- Stats at Pro Football Reference

Marques D. Sullivan (born February 2, 1978) is an American former professional football player who was a guard in the National Football League (NFL). He played college football for the Illinois Fighting Illini. He played in the NFL for the Buffalo Bills, New York Giants, and New England Patriots

== Early life ==
Sullivan was a multi-sport athlete at Fenwick High School, earning letters in football, wrestling, and bowling. In football, Sullivan played on both the offensive and defensive line. In 1995, Sullivan was one of the top three offensive lineman in the country, achieving All-American and All-State honors and helping the Friars reach a 12-1 record. He was named all-state by the Chicago Sun-Times and the Champaign-Urbana News Gazette, and a high school All-American by Parade.

== College career ==
Sullivan was one of the most highly recruited high school offensive lineman in the country. He decided to accept a scholarship to play college football for the Fighting Illini at the University of Illinois Urbana-Champaign. As a redshirt freshman, Sullivan was an offensive tackle, starting in all eleven games for the Illini.

During his sophomore year, Sullivan started eleven games at right tackle.

In his junior year, he started all twelve games at left tackle and was named to the All-Big Ten second-team. The Illini played in the MicronPC.com Bowl, finishing with an 8-4 season. Sullivan was named to the All-Bowl team after the season.

His senior year, he was named first-team Playboy All American, third-team FWAA All-American, as well as an honorable mention Football News All-American. He was also named All Big Ten second-team that same year.

Sullivan graduated from the University of Illinois with a degree in Recreation, Sport and Tourism Management.

== Professional career ==
Sullivan was selected in the fifth round of the 2001 NFL draft by the Buffalo Bills. In his rookie season, he played in 12 games and started two games at offensive tackle.

Sullivan started 25 games for the Bills during the 2002 and 2003 seasons, blocking for Pro Bowlers Travis Henry and Drew Bledsoe. In 2002, Sullivan was named Most Improved Player by the Buffalo Bills.

In 2004, he played for the New York Giants and the New England Patriots. Sullivan retired from football in 2007 after playing for the Chicago Rush in the same year.

He is involved with many charitable causes in the Chicago area. He served as the Director of the Chicago NFL Alumni Football Camp, coaching high school aged children. Sullivan also coached for the Chicago Bears Youth Football Camp coaching children ages 6–13. Sullivan also served as the NFL Alumni its executive vice president of the Chicago Chapter and as a vice president of the National Football League Former Player's Association - Chicago Chapter.

On July 10, 2008 North Park University announced that Sullivan would be the football team's new offensive line coach.

Sullivan is currently the Vice President of the NFL Retired Players Association - Chicago Chapter. He is also a board member of the post-graduate prep school, Midwest Prep Academy.

== Personal life ==
Sullivan is married to former U.S. national level gymnast, Veronica Saldana Sullivan.
