= Kendrick Office =

American football player (born 1978)

No. 77
- Position: Defensive end

Personal information
- Born: August 2, 1978 (age 48); Butler, Alabama, U.S.
- Listed height: 6 ft 5 in (1.96 m)
- Listed weight: 270 lb (122 kg)

Career information
- High school: Choctaw County (Butler)
- College: West Alabama (1997–2000)
- NFL draft: 2001: undrafted

Career history
- Buffalo Bills (2001)*; Cleveland Browns (2001)*; Buffalo Bills (2001–2002); San Jose SaberCats (2007)
- * Offseason or practice squad member only

Awards and highlights
- ArenaBowl champion (2007)

Career NFL statistics
- Tackles: 29
- Sacks: 3
- Forced fumbles: 2
- Stats at Pro Football Reference

Kendrick LaShawn Office (born August 2, 1978) is an American former professional football player who was a defensive end for two seasons with the Buffalo Bills of the National Football League (NFL). He played college football for the West Alabama Tigers.

== Early life ==
Kendrick LaShawn Office was born on August 2, 1978, in Butler, Alabama. He attended Choctaw County High School in Butler. He was team MVP in both football and basketball. Office totaled 80 tackles, 20 sacks, and three fumble recoveries as a senior in high school.

== College career ==
Office played college football for the Tigers of the University of West Alabama. He was a four-year starter from 1997 to 2000. He started all ten games as a true freshman in 1997, posting 36 tackles and 3.5 sacks. Office was a three-time first-team All-Gulf South Conference honoree. He posted college career totals of 239 tackles and 20.5 sacks. He was the first West Alabama player to play in the Blue–Gray Football Classic. He had three tackles and one sack during the game. Office graduated with a bachelor’s degree in sports management. He was inducted into West Alabama's athletics hall of fame in 2017.

== Professional career ==
Office signed with the Buffalo Bills on April 24, 2001, after going undrafted in the 2001 NFL draft. He was waived on August 28, 2001.

Office was claimed off waivers by the Cleveland Browns on August 29, 2001. He was released by the Browns on September 2, 2001.

Office was signed to the Bills' practice squad on September 4, 2001. He was promoted to the active roster on October 3, 2001. He played in eight games, starting one, for the Bills during the 2001 season, recording 11 solo tackles, five assisted tackles, three sacks, and two forced fumbles. Office appeared in ten games, starting one, in 2002, totaling four solo tackles, nine assisted tackles, and one fumble recovery. He became a free agent after the 2002 season.

Office was signed to the practice squad of the San Jose SaberCats of the Arena Football League on May 21, 2007. He was promoted to the active roster on July 6, 2007, before the first game of the playoffs. On July 29, 2007, the SaberCats won ArenaBowl XXI against the Columbus Destroyers by a score of 55–33. Office was placed on refuse to report on February 4, 2008.
