= Tyrone Robertson =

American football player (born 1979)

No. 92
- Position: Defensive tackle

Personal information
- Born: August 15, 1979 (age 47); Danville, Virginia, U.S.
- Listed height: 6 ft 4 in (1.93 m)
- Listed weight: 295 lb (134 kg)

Career information
- High school: George Washington (Danville)
- College: Georgia
- NFL draft: 2001: 7th round, 238th overall pick

Career history
- Buffalo Bills (2001–2002) (Note: Robertson was on the Bills' reserve/suspended list from 2003 until 2015.)

Career NFL statistics
- Tackles: 26
- Sacks: 2
- Passes deflected: 1
- Stats at Pro Football Reference

Julius Tyrone Robertson (born August 15, 1979) is an American former professional football player who played defensive tackle for one season for the Buffalo Bills of the National Football League (NFL).

== Professional career ==
Robertson was selected in the seventh round of the 2001 NFL draft by the Buffalo Bills. He played in twelve games during his rookie season, recording two sacks and 26 total tackles. He was declared inactive for the first four weeks of the 2002 NFL season, before being suspended for the next four games by the NFL for a repeated violation of the league's substance abuse policy. Robertson's suspension ended on October 28, 2002, and he was subsequently placed on the team's reserve/non-football illness list, where he spent six weeks. On December 10, 2002, the NFL announced that Robertson was suspended for one year for another violation of the substance abuse policy. He remained on the reserve/suspended list until being officially released from it on April 15, 2016.

== Legal issues ==
On November 22, 2004, Robertson was arrested and charged with possession of marijuana and cocaine with the intent to distribute, as well as the possession of a firearm at a Ramada Inn in Danville, Virginia.
