= Tony Driver =

American football player (born 1977)

No. 25
- Position: Safety

Personal information
- Born: August 4, 1977 (age 49); Louisville, Kentucky, U.S.
- Listed height: 6 ft 1 in (1.85 m)
- Listed weight: 207 lb (94 kg)

Career information
- High school: Louisville Male
- College: Notre Dame
- NFL draft: 2001: 6th round, 178th overall pick

Career history
- Buffalo Bills (2001–2002)

Career NFL statistics
- Games played: 11
- Kick returns: 8
- Return yards: 157
- Stats at Pro Football Reference

Tony Danielle Driver (born August 4, 1977) is an American former professional football player who was a safety or the Buffalo Bills of the National Football League (NFL). He was selected in the sixth round of the 2001 NFL draft. He played for the Bills in 2001 and 2002. Driver played college football for the Notre Dame Fighting Irish.
