= Brandon Spoon =

American football player (born 1978)

No. 58
- Position: Linebacker

Personal information
- Born: July 5, 1978 (age 48); Burlington, North Carolina, U.S.

Career information
- High school: Williams (Burlington)
- College: North Carolina
- NFL draft: 2001: 4th round, 110th overall pick

Career history
- Buffalo Bills (2001–2002)

Awards and highlights
- 2× Second-team All-ACC (1998, 2000)

Career NFL statistics
- Tackles: 65
- Interceptions: 2
- Touchdowns: 2
- Stats at Pro Football Reference

Thomas Brandon Spoon (born July 5, 1978) is an American former professional football player who was a linebacker for one season with the Buffalo Bills of the National Football League (NFL). He played college football for the North Carolina Tar Heels and was selected in the fourth round of the 2001 NFL draft with the 110th overall pick. In his only NFL season, he was the Bills starting middle linebacker.
