= Tom Donahoe =

American football executive

Career history
- Pittsburgh Steelers General Manager/Director of Football Operations (1991–1999); Buffalo Bills President/General Manager (2001–2005); Philadelphia Eagles (2012–2022); Senior Advisor (2012–2015); Senior Director of Player Personnel (2015–2022)
- Executive profile at Pro Football Reference

Tom Donahoe is an American former professional football executive in the National Football League (NFL). He served as the general manager of the Buffalo Bills and Pittsburgh Steelers and the senior advisor and director of player personnel for the Philadelphia Eagles.

== Biography ==
Donahoe was born and raised in the Pittsburgh suburb of Mt. Lebanon. He is a grandson of longtime Pittsburgh mayor and Pennsylvania Governor David L. Lawrence. He was "director of football operations" (GM) for the Pittsburgh Steelers from 1991 to 1999. The Steelers reached Super Bowl XXX in 1995. In what was largely seen as a power struggle between himself and head coach Bill Cowher, Donahoe left the team following the 1999 season.

In 2000, Donahoe took on a job at ESPN.com for the following year.

Before the 2001 season, Donahoe was selected to replace John Butler as general manager of the Buffalo Bills, as well as take over the position of team president from a retiring Ralph Wilson. Wilson, while still maintaining ownership of the team, wanted to step aside from the day-to-day operations of the franchise, and chose Donahoe to take his place. After the 2005 season, Donahoe was fired. The team had been 31–48 during his tenure with the team from 2001 to 2005, and he drafted only three players who would go on to make the Pro Bowl with the team. Wilson re-assumed the role of president, and the general manager position was filled by former Bills head coach Marv Levy.

He was named a senior advisor to the Philadelphia Eagles in 2012. In December 2015, Donahoe was named senior director of player personnel. With the Eagles, Donahoe won Super Bowl LII. In May 2022, the Eagles parted ways with Donahoe.
