= Brian Moorman =

American football player (born 1976)

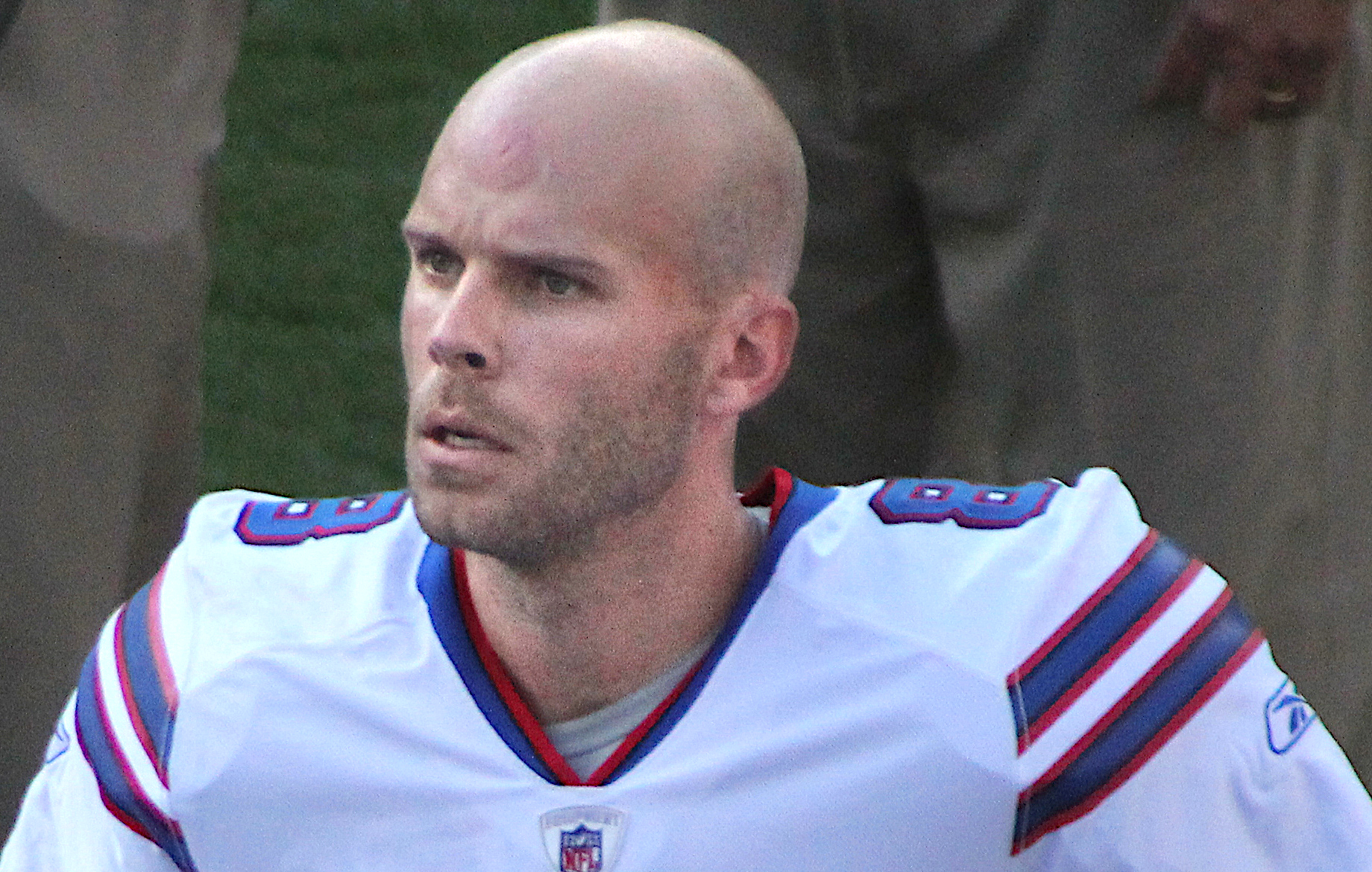
- Moorman with the Buffalo Bills in 2011

No. 8, 2
- Position: Punter

Personal information
- Born: February 5, 1976 (age 50); Wichita, Kansas, U.S.
- Listed height: 6 ft 0 in (1.83 m)
- Listed weight: 174 lb (79 kg)

Career information
- High school: Sedgwick (Sedgwick, Kansas)
- College: Pittsburg State (1995–1998)
- NFL draft: 1999: undrafted

Career history
- Seattle Seahawks (1999–2000)*; Berlin Thunder (2000–2001); Buffalo Bills (2001–2012); Dallas Cowboys (2012); Pittsburgh Steelers (2013)*; Buffalo Bills (2013)
- * Offseason or practice squad member only

Awards and highlights
- World Bowl champion (IX); 2× First-team All-Pro (2005, 2006); 2× Pro Bowl (2005, 2006); NFL 2000s All-Decade Team; Buffalo Bills 50th Anniversary Team; 2× First-team DII All-American (1997, 1998); Kansas Sports Hall of Fame

Career NFL statistics
- Punts: 979
- Punting yards: 42,867
- Punting average: 43.8
- Longest punt: 84
- Inside 20: 281
- Stats at Pro Football Reference

Brian Donald Moorman (born February 5, 1976) is an American former professional football player who was a punter in the National Football League (NFL). He played college football for the Pittsburg State Gorillas, and was signed by the Seattle Seahawks as an undrafted free agent after the 1999 NFL draft.

He played for the Buffalo Bills from 2001 to 2012, to which he returned after a one-year absence in 2013. He also played for the Dallas Cowboys in 2012, and was a member of the Pittsburgh Steelers during the offseason prior to 2013, but was waived during the preseason. Moorman is a two-time Pro Bowl selection and was voted to the Buffalo Bills 50th Anniversary Team and the NFL 2000s All-Decade Team.

He is the founder of the P.U.N.T. Foundation, which supports children in Western New York who face life-threatening illnesses.

== Early life ==
At Sedgwick High School in Sedgwick, Kansas, Moorman lettered in football, track, and basketball. In track, he was a three-time state hurdle champion and received all-state honors in Football and Basketball.

== College career ==
Moorman became the first four-time All-American football player in Pittsburg State University history. He earned first-team NCAA Division II All-America honors as a punter in each of his final two collegiate seasons (1997–98) after earning honorable mention All-America honors his first two years (1995–96). Moorman still holds the school's career punting record (43.97 ypp) and he was named to PSU's prestigious 100th Anniversary Football Team in 2003.

=== Track and field ===
Moorman earned All-America honors on 10 occasions, including three straight NCAA Division II national championships in the 400 meter hurdles (1997–99). He also claimed eight conference individual event titles. Moorman also still ranks second all-time at PSU in the 400m hurdles (49.77).

==== Personal bests ====
Event	Time (seconds)	Venue	Date
55 metres hurdles	7.50	Indianapolis, Indiana	March 5, 1999
110 metres hurdles	13.81	Emporia, Kansas	May 29, 1999
400 metres hurdles	49.77	Edwardsville, Illinois	May 23, 1998

== Professional career ==
=== Buffalo Bills ===
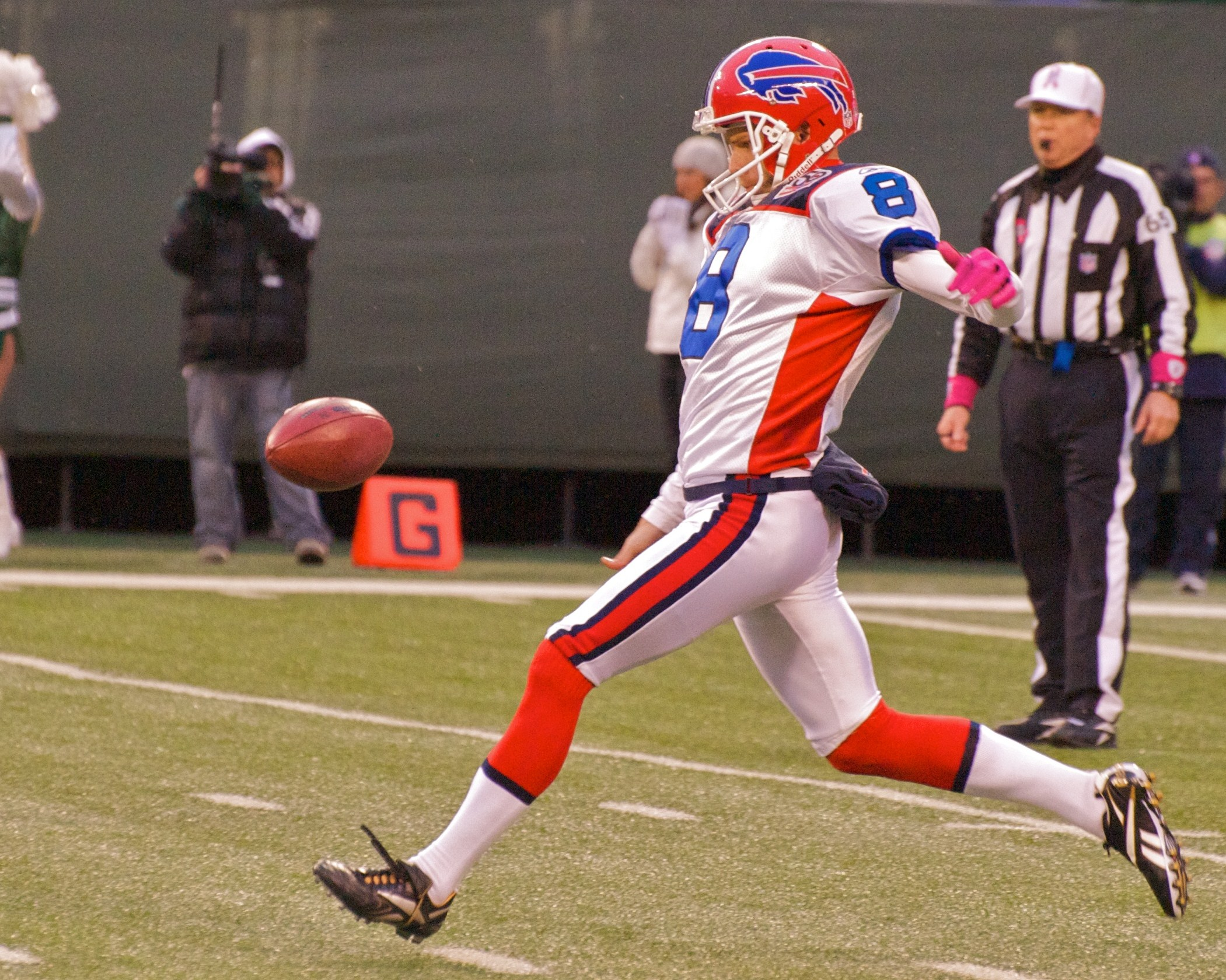
Moorman with the Bills in 2009.

Moorman signed with the Buffalo Bills as a free agent during the summer of 2001.

Moorman was named to the starting squad of the 2006 Pro Bowl for the second consecutive year. Moorman also made the 2007 Pro Bowl in which during the game he was most remembered for getting hit hard by Washington Redskins safety Sean Taylor, which is considered one of Taylor's most memorable plays.

On July 2, 2007, the Buffalo Bills rewarded Moorman with a $10 million contract extension (through 2012), making him the second-highest paid punter in the league, behind Shane Lechler.

In a 2008 34–10 opening day victory over the Seattle Seahawks, Moorman lined up to hold for what looked like a routine field goal attempt by placekicker Rian Lindell but instead took the ball and heaved a 19-yard touchdown strike to defensive end Ryan Denney.

Moorman had a career average of 46.6 yards per punt. In 2009, he also had a new career high in total yards punting with 4192 yards. On September 25, 2012, the Bills released Moorman soon after the third regular season game. He was replaced by Shawn Powell.

=== Dallas Cowboys ===
On September 26, 2012, Moorman signed with the Dallas Cowboys to replace an injured Chris Jones. He played 12 games with the Cowboys for a total of 15 games played in the 2012 regular season.

=== Pittsburgh Steelers ===
Moorman signed with the Pittsburgh Steelers on April 30, 2013. He was waived during the preseason.

=== Return to the Buffalo Bills ===
Moorman re-signed with the Buffalo Bills on October 6, 2013, after the release of Shawn Powell. He was released August 29, 2014.

=== Retirement ===
Following his second release from the Bills, he announced his retirement through a letter to the city of Buffalo. Despite 14 years of professional football, Moorman never played a single postseason game, making him the only member of the NFL's 2000 All-Decade team to never play in a playoff game.

== NFL career statistics ==
Legend
	Led the league
**Bold**	Career high

Year	Team	Punting									
Year	Team	GP	Punts	Yds	Net Yds	Lng	Avg	Net Avg	Blk	Ins20	TB
2001	BUF	16	80	3,262	2,704	66	40.8	33.8	0	16	7
2002	BUF	16	66	2,844	2,410	**84**	43.1	36.0	**1**	18	7
2003	BUF	16	85	3,788	3,151	71	44.6	37.1	0	20	3
2004	BUF	16	77	3,325	2,830	80	43.2	36.8	0	17	9
2005	BUF	16	71	3,242	2,777	68	45.7	39.1	0	22	9
2006	BUF	16	**92**	4,012	3,607	66	43.6	39.2	0	**33**	7
2007	BUF	16	81	3,302	3,046	75	40.8	37.6	0	30	3
2008	BUF	16	58	2,557	2,270	63	44.1	39.1	0	23	5
2009	BUF	16	90	**4,192**	**3,615**	73	46.6	**40.2**	0	25	**10**
2010	BUF	16	75	3,181	2,742	61	42.4	36.6	0	17	7
2011	BUF	16	72	3,472	2,778	66	**48.2**	38.1	**1**	20	**10**
2012	BUF	3	15	682	490	66	45.5	32.7	0	2	1
2012	DAL	12	56	2,497	2,180	64	44.6	38.9	0	22	3
2013	BUF	11	61	2,511	2,234	62	41.2	36.6	0	16	4
Career		202	979	42,867	36,834	84	43.8	37.5	2	281	85

=== Awards ===
Award	Date
AFC Special Teams Player of the Month	October 2002
AFC Special Teams Player of the Week	Week 6, 2004
AFC Special Teams Player of the Week	Week 10, 2005
AFC Special Teams Player of the Month	November 2005
AFC Special Teams Player of the Week	Week 9, 2006
AFC Special Teams Player of the Month	November 2006
AFC Special Teams Player of the Week	Week 15, 2006
AFC Special Teams Player of the Week	Week 7, 2009
