= Jonas Jennings =

American football player and coach (born 1977)

Georgia Bulldogs
- Title: Director of player development

Personal information
- Born: November 21, 1977 (age 48); College Park, Georgia, U.S.
- Listed height: 6 ft 3 in (1.91 m)
- Listed weight: 328 lb (149 kg)

Career information
- High school: Tri-Cities (East Point, Georgia)
- College: Georgia (1996–2000)
- NFL draft: 2001: 3rd round, 95th overall pick

Career history

Playing
- Buffalo Bills (2001–2004); San Francisco 49ers (2005–2008)

Coaching
- Georgia (2016–present) Director of player development

Awards and highlights
- As player: Second-team All-SEC (2000); As coach: 2 Nationals (2021, 2022)

Career NFL statistics
- Games played: 75
- Games started: 75
- Fumble recoveries: 1
- Stats at Pro Football Reference

Jonas Duran Jennings (born November 21, 1977) is an American former professional football player who was an offensive tackle that played in the National Football League (NFL). He was selected by the Buffalo Bills in the third round of the 2001 NFL draft. He has also played for the San Francisco 49ers. He played college football for the Georgia Bulldogs. Jennings is now director of player development for his alma mater, the University of Georgia. He was part of the Bulldogs' coaching staff that won the National Championship over Alabama in the 2021 season.

== Professional career ==
=== Buffalo Bills ===
Jennings was drafted by the Buffalo Bills in the third round of the 2001 NFL draft with the 95th overall pick.

In 2001, Jennings played 12 games, all of which he started at right tackle. In 2002, he moved to left tackle, starting all 15 games in which he appeared. After 11 games in 2003, Jennings was placed on injured reserve with a toe injury. His final season with the Bills was 2004, when he started and played in 14 games.

=== San Francisco 49ers ===
Jennings signed with the San Francisco 49ers on March 3, 2005.

In his first season in San Francisco, he started the first three games of the season before being placed on injured reserve.

During the 2006 season, started 13 games and missed three. During the season, he was named a co-captain along with teammates Alex Smith, Walt Harris, Bryant Young and Keith Lewis.

On October 4, 2007, Jonas Jennings took a leave of absence from the San Francisco 49ers to deal with 'private matters'. He was replaced by Adam Snyder for the week 5 game against the Baltimore Ravens. It was announced the week after that he would rejoin the team as the starter at LT, but during the next game against the New York Giants he split time with his backup Adam Snyder.

Jennings sustained a high ankle sprain in the second quarter of the 49ers' loss to the Giants on October 21 and missed the subsequent two games. On November 5 he was placed on Injured Reserve; coach Mike Nolan stated that Jennings was to undergo surgery to remove "loose bodies" in his ankle, effectively ending his 2007–2008 season.

The 49ers brought Jennings back for the 2008 NFL season but did not guarantee him a starting position. During the 2008 season Jennings continued his injury-stricken career as a 49er when he injured his right shoulder. Although he insisted on remaining on the sideline as an emergency backup, ultimately he was placed on injured reserve to undergo his 3rd shoulder surgery.

Jennings was released by the 49ers on March 27, 2009.
