= 2007 Grand Rapids Rampage season =

Arena Football League team season

- Head coach: Sparky McEwen
- Home stadium: Grand Rapids Rampage

Results
- Record: 4–12
- Division place: 5th
- Playoffs: Did not qualify

The 2007 Grand Rapids Rampage season was the 10th season for the franchise. They look to make the playoffs after finishing 2006 with a 5–11 record. They went 4–12 record and missed the playoffs.

== Schedule ==
Week	Date	Opponent	Home/Away Game	Result
1	March 4	Colorado Crush	Away	W 44–42
2	March 8	Las Vegas Gladiators	Home	L 79–69
3	March 15	Philadelphia Soul	Home	L 69–40
4	March 23	Utah Blaze	Road	L 82–43
5		Bye	Week	
6	April 7	New York Dragons	Home	W 66–53
7	April 14	Kansas City Brigade	Away	L 51–42
8	April 21	Chicago Rush	Home	L 75–54
9	April 28	Los Angeles Avengers	Away	L 75–71
10	May 5	Nashville Kats	Home	W 71–55
11	May 11	Columbus Destroyers	Away	L 59–56
12	May 19	San Jose SaberCats	Away	L 69–44
13	May 26	Colorado Crush	Home	W 58–56
14	June 2	Kansas City Brigade	Home	L 66–53
15	June 9	Chicago Rush	Away	L 55–32
16	June 16	Tampa Bay Storm	Home	L 69–40
17	June 23	Nashville Kats	Away	L 57–54

== Coaching ==
Sparky McEwen was coach of the Rampage during this season.

== Stats ==
=== Offense ===
==== Passing ====
Player	Comp.	Att.	Comp%	Yards	TD's	INT's	Long	Rating
Chad Salisbury	212	339	62.5	2242	49	8	46	108.1
Adrian McPherson	265	440	60.2	3193	51	14	49	98.2
Matthew Sauk	58	102	56.9	686	12	4	43	90.6
Michael Bishop	26	44	59.1	251	3	3	28	63.7

==== Rushing ====
Player	Car.	Yards	Avg.	TD's	Long
Adrian McPherson	55	360	6.5	9	39
Chris Ryan	77	162	2.1	20	14
Johnnie Balous	6	28	4.7	0	9
Michael Bishop	8	16	2	0	12
Jerome Riley	2	8	4	0	7
Timon Marshall	12	7	.6	2	6
Chad Salisbury	3	1	.3	0	1
Matthew Sauk	1	0	0	0	0
Ronney Daniels	1	−1	−1	0	−1

==== Receiving ====
Player	Rec.	Yards	Avg.	TD's	Long
Cornelius Bonner	102	1436	14.1	29	49
Timon Marshall	102	1134	11.1	27	34
Jerome Riley	78	845	10.8	12	43
Scotty Anderson	31	323	10.4	6	33
Clarence Coleman	23	253	11	3	28
Ronney Daniels	23	243	10.6	6	30
Jermaine Lewis	23	234	10.2	2	30
Troy Edwards	27	220	8.1	2	24
Kenny Solomon	18	201	11.2	3	46
Chris Ryan	9	70	7.8	1	24
Winfield Garnett	1	2	2	0	2

==== Touchdowns ====
Player	TD's	Rush	Rec	Ret	Pts
Timon Marshall	35	2	27	6	228
Cornelius Bonner	29	0	29	0	174
Chris Ryan	22	20	1	1	140
Jerome Riley	12	0	12	0	96
Adrian McPherson	9	9	0	0	56
Scotty Anderson	6	0	6	0	36
Ronney Daniels	6	0	6	0	36
Clarence Coleman	3	0	3	0	18
Kenny Solomon	3	0	3	0	18
Troy Edwards	2	0	2	0	12
Jermaine Lewis	2	0	2	0	12

=== Defense ===
Player	Tackles	Solo	Assisted	Sack	Solo	Assisted	INT	Yards	TD's	Long
Chuck Wesley	88	75	26	0	0	0	3	38	0	22
Johnnie Harris	57	54	8	0	0	0	7	20	0	17
Tony Scott	35.5	31	9	0	0	0	0	0	0	0
Jerome Riley	31.5	24	15	0	0	0	4	35	2	20
Trey Bell	23.5	18	11	0	0	0	0	0	0	0
Angel Estrada	23	20	6	0	0	0	0	0	0	0
Chris Ryan	16.5	10	13	0	0	0	0	0	0	0
Winfield Garnett	15	11	8	3.5	3	1	0	0	0	0
Gillis Wilson	15	5	20	2.5	1	3	0	0	0	0
Johnnie Balous	14.5	8	13	2.5	2	1	0	0	0	0
Jermaine Lewis	14.5	10	9	0	0	0	1	2	0	2
Chukie Nwokorie	14	10	8	1	1	0	0	0	0	0
Bryan Henderson	13	8	10	3.5	2	3	1	12	0	12
Timon Marshall	11.5	8	7	0	0	0	0	0	0	0
Mondre Dickerson	14.5	7	7	7.5	8	0	0	0	0	0
Cornelius Bonner	7.5	7	1	0	0	0	0	0	0	0
Clarence Coleman	7.5	5	5	0	0	0	0	0	0	0
Kenny Solomon	6	4	4	0	0	0	0	0	0	0
Michael Bishop	6	4	4	0	0	0	0	0	0	0
Brian Gowins	5.5	3	5	0	0	0	0	0	0	0
Ronney Daniels	5	2	6	0	0	0	0	0	0	0
Buck Gurley	5	2	6	0	0	0	0	0	0	0
Greg Scott	3	2	2	0	0	0	0	0	0	0
Scotty Anderson	2.5	2	1	0	0	0	0	0	0	0
Mark Radlinski	1.5	1	1	0	0	0	0	0	0	0
LaWaylon Brown	1	0	2	0	0	0	0	0	0	0
Troy Edwards	1	0	2	0	0	0	0	0	0	0
Mike McFaddon	1	1	0	1	1	0	0	0	0	0
Adrian McPherson	1	1	0	0	0	0	0	0	0	0
Kyle Rasmussen	1	0	2	0	0	0	0	0	0	0
Chad Salisbury	1	1	0	0	0	0	0	0	0	0
Todd Williams	1	1	0	0	0	0	0	0	0	0
Jason Berger	.5	0	1	0	0	0	0	0	0	0
Cliff Green	.5	0	1	0	0	0	0	0	0	0
Ronnie Washburn	.5	0	1	0	0	0	0	0	0	0

=== Special teams ===
==== Kick return ====
Player	Ret	Yards	TD's	Long	Avg	Ret	Yards	TD's	Long	Avg
Timon Marshall	83	1901	6	58	22.9	1	7	0	7	7
Clarence Coleman	19	270	0	24	14.2	0	0	0	0	0
Jerome Riley	8	37	0	14	4.6	0	0	0	0	0
Michael Bishop	1	13	0	13	13	0	0	0	0	0
Cornelius Bonner	1	9	0	9	9	0	0	0	0	0
Chris Ryan	1	8	1	8	8	0	0	0	0	0
Chuck Wesley	2	3	0	3	1.5	0	0	0	0	0
Troy Edwards	1	9	0	9	9	0	0	0	0	0

==== Kicking ====
Player	Extra pt.	Extra pt. Att.	FG	FGA	Long	Pct.	Pts
Brian Gowins	92	108	15	30	47	0.500	137
