= 2002 Buffalo Bills season =

43rd season in franchise history

- Owner: Ralph Wilson
- General manager: Tom Donahoe
- Head coach: Gregg Williams
- Home stadium: Ralph Wilson Stadium

Results
- Record: 8–8
- Division place: 4th AFC East
- Playoffs: Did not qualify
- All-Pros: WR Eric Moulds (2nd team); G Ruben Brown (2nd team)
- Pro Bowlers: QB Drew Bledsoe; RB Travis Henry; WR Eric Moulds; G Ruben Brown

The 2002 season was the Buffalo Bills' 43rd as a franchise and 33rd in the National Football League.

The Bills acquired veteran quarterback Drew Bledsoe from the New England Patriots on draft weekend in exchange for Buffalo's first-round pick in the 2003 draft, (the Bills later gained a first-round pick via a sign-and-trade of receiver Peerless Price, coming off a breakout season, to the Atlanta Falcons for their first-round pick in the 2003 draft). Bledsoe brought instant credibility to Buffalo's inept passing game; the Bills' offense scored the sixth most points in the AFC in 2002, after having scored the fifth fewest in the entire league the previous season.

The Bills competed in a very competitive AFC East, but ultimately finished the season in last place at 8–8 and missed the playoffs for the third straight season. They were the only team in the division who didn't finish with a winning record or win 9 games during the season.

The season saw the Bills change their uniform, which lasted until 2011.

== Offseason ==
Additions	Subtractions
QB Drew Bledsoe (Patriots)	QB Rob Johnson (Buccaneers)
LB London Fletcher (Rams)	LB Jay Foreman (Texans)
K Mike Hollis (Jaguars)	LB Sam Cowart (Jets)
TE Dave Moore (Buccaneers)	T John Fina (Cardinals)
DE Chidi Ahanotu (Rams)	CB Ken Irvin (Saints)
LB Eddie Robinson (Titans)	G Craig Heimburger (Texans)
T Marcus Price (Saints)	
C Trey Teague (Broncos)	
S Billy Jenkins (Packers)	

=== 2002 expansion draft ===
Buffalo Bills selected during the expansion draft
Round	Overall	Name	Position	Expansion team
—	16	Avion Black	Wide receiver	Houston Texans

=== Draft ===
The Bills infamously drafted Mike Williams, an offensive tackle from Texas with the #4 overall pick of the draft, with University of Miami offensive tackle Bryant McKinnie still available. Williams spent only four seasons with the team. Sporting News named Williams as the #4 biggest NFL draft bust from 1989–2008.

2002 Buffalo Bills draft
Round	Pick	Player	Position	College	Notes
1	4	Mike Williams	OT	Texas	
2	36	Josh Reed	WR	LSU	
2	61	Ryan Denney	DE	BYU	
3	97	Coy Wire	S	Stanford	
5	139	Justin Bannan	DT	Colorado	
6	179	Kevin Thomas	CB	UNLV	
7	215	Mike Pucillo	C	Auburn	
7	249	Rodney Wright	WR	Fresno State	
7	251	Jarrett Ferguson	RB	Virginia Tech	
7	260	Dominique Stevenson	LB	Tennessee	
Made roster † Pro Football Hall of Fame * Made at least one Pro Bowl during career

=== Undrafted free agents ===
2002 undrafted free agents of note
Player	Position	College
Ahmad Brooks	Cornerback	Texas
Jamarei Bryant	Cornerback	Kansas
Joe Burns	Running back	Georgia Tech
Clarence Coleman	Wide receiver	Ferris State
Edward Dangerfield	Wide receiver	LSU
John Duckett	Linebacker	Virginia
Grant Irons	Defensive end	Notre Dame
Chip Mattingly	Long Snapper	Louisville
David Priestley	Quarterback	Pittsburgh
Milton Proctor	Safety	Kansas State
Marc Samuel	Kicker	Georgetown

== Personnel ==
2002 Buffalo Bills staff
Front office: Chairman – Ralph Wilson; President/general manager – Tom Donahoe; Assistant general manager – Tom Modrak; Director of pro personnel – John Guy; Head coaches: Head coach – Gregg Williams; Offensive coaches: Offensive coordinator – Kevin Gilbride; Quarterbacks – Steve Kragthorpe; Running backs – Steve Fairchild; Wide receivers – Fred Graves; Tight ends – Dan Neal; Offensive line – Ronnie Vinklarek; Offensive assistant – Tommy Kaiser	Defensive coaches: Defensive coordinator – Jerry Gray; Defensive line – John Levra; Assistant defensive line – O’Neill Gilbert; Linebackers – Miles Aldridge; Defensive Backs (Cornerbacks) – Pat Thomas; Third Down Specialist (Safeties) – Steve Jackson; Defensive assistant – Chuck Lester; Special teams coaches: Special teams coordinator – Danny Smith; Special teams assistant – Tommy Kaiser; Strength and conditioning: Strength and conditioning coordinator – Rusty Jones

== Roster ==
2002 Buffalo Bills roster
Quarterbacks (QB): 11 Drew Bledsoe; 5 Travis Brown; 10 Alex Van Pelt; Running backs (RB): 35 Joe Burns; 37 Larry Centers FB; 41 Phil Crosby; 20 Travis Henry; 33 Sammy Morris; 31 Charlie Rogers; Wide receivers (WR): 89 Charles Johnson; 80 Eric Moulds; 81 Peerless Price; 82 Josh Reed; 87 Andre Rone; Tight ends (TE): 48 Brady McDonnell LS; 83 Dave Moore; 85 Jay Riemersma	Offensive linemen (OL): 79 Ruben Brown G; 63 Bill Conaty C; 69 Mike Houghton G; 75 Jonas Jennings T; 73 Marcus Price T; 61 Mike Pucillo G; 74 Marques Sullivan G; 70 Trey Teague C; 68 Mike Williams T; Defensive linemen (DL): 72 Chidi Ahanotu DE; 97 Justin Bannan DT; 92 Ryan Denney DE; 98 Ron Edwards DT; 96 Grant Irons DE; 77 Kendrick Office DE; 94 Aaron Schobel DE; 93 Pat Williams DT	Linebackers (LB): 56 Anthony Denman OLB; 54 Greg Favors OLB; 59 London Fletcher MLB; 51 DaShon Polk OLB; 53 Keith Newman OLB; 55 Eddie Robinson OLB; 50 Dominique Stevenson MLB; Defensive backs (DB): 47 Ahmad Brooks CB; 22 Nate Clements CB; 25 Tony Driver FS; 30 Marcus Floyd CB; 24 Billy Jenkins SS; 23 Pierson Prioleau FS; 28 Kevin Thomas CB; 21 Chris Watson CB; 26 Antoine Winfield CB; 27 Coy Wire SS; Special teams (ST): 1 Mike Hollis K; 8 Brian Moorman P	Practice squad: 14 Clarence Coleman WR; 71 Joey Hollenbeck G; 91 Omari Jordan DT; 76 Richard Seals DT; 19 Rodney Wright WR; Reserve: -- Reggie Allen WR (NF-Inj.); 29 Jason Bostic CB (IR); 38 Shawn Bryson RB (IR); 6 David Dinkins QB (NF-Ill.); -- Marcus Jones DE (IR); 58 Brandon Spoon LB (IR); Rookies in italics 53 active, 6 reserve, 5 practice squad

== Regular season ==
Due to the Bills' 3–13 record the previous season, the NFL did not schedule any of their games in prime time (Sunday night or Monday night), and all but two of the Bills' games had 1:00 start times. However, due to the attention the Bills' free-agent acquisitions brought to the team, as well as the team being in the thick of the competitive AFC East race, several division games were aired nationally on CBS.

After a one-year absence, the NFL Primetime theme "Powersurge" returned as the Bills' theme song on the ESPN program. It was used for the show's Bills highlights for each game during the season except for the Bengals/Bills game in Week 17.

=== Schedule ===
Week	Date	Opponent	Result	Record	Venue	Attendance	Recap
1	September 8	**New York Jets**	**L** 31–37 (OT)	0–1	Ralph Wilson Stadium	72,751	Recap
2	September 15	at Minnesota Vikings	**W** 45–39 (OT)	1–1	Hubert H. Humphrey Metrodome	64,047	Recap
3	September 22	at Denver Broncos	**L** 23–28	1–2	Invesco Field at Mile High	75,359	Recap
4	September 29	Chicago Bears	**W** 33–27 (OT)	2–2	Ralph Wilson Stadium	72,780	Recap
5	October 6	Oakland Raiders	**L** 31–49	2–3	Ralph Wilson Stadium	73,038	Recap
6	October 13	at Houston Texans	**W** 31–24	3–3	Reliant Stadium	70,120	Recap
7	October 20	at **Miami Dolphins**	**W** 23–10	4–3	Pro Player Stadium	73,180	Recap
8	October 27	Detroit Lions	**W** 24–17	5–3	Ralph Wilson Stadium	72,710	Recap
9	November 3	**New England Patriots**	**L** 7–38	5–4	Ralph Wilson Stadium	73,448	Recap
10	Bye						
11	November 17	at Kansas City Chiefs	**L** 16–17	5–5	Arrowhead Stadium	77,951	Recap
12	November 24	at **New York Jets**	**L** 13–31	5–6	Giants Stadium	78,745	Recap
13	December 1	**Miami Dolphins**	**W** 38–21	6–6	Ralph Wilson Stadium	73,287	Recap
14	December 8	at **New England Patriots**	**L** 17–27	6–7	Gillette Stadium	68,436	Recap
15	December 15	San Diego Chargers	**W** 20–13	7–7	Ralph Wilson Stadium	61,838	Recap
16	December 22	at Green Bay Packers	**L** 0–10	7–8	Lambeau Field	64,106	Recap
17	December 29	Cincinnati Bengals	**W** 27–9	8–8	Ralph Wilson Stadium	47,850	Recap

Note: Intra-division opponents are in bold text.

=== Standings ===
AFC East
	W	L	T	PCT	DIV	CONF	PF	PA	STK
^{(4)} New York Jets	9	7	0	.563	4–2	6–6	359	336	W2
New England Patriots	9	7	0	.563	4–2	6–6	381	346	W1
Miami Dolphins	9	7	0	.563	2–4	7–5	378	301	L2
Buffalo Bills	8	8	0	.500	2–4	5–7	379	397	W1

=== Game summaries ===
==== Week 1: vs. New York Jets ====
Week 1: New York Jets (0–0) at Buffalo Bills (0–0) – Game summary

Quarter	1	2	3	4	OT	Total
**Jets**	0	17	3	11	6	**37**
Bills	3	14	7	7	0	**31**

at Ralph Wilson Stadium, Orchard Park, New York

- Date: September 8, 2002
- Game time: 1:00 pm
- Game weather: Sunny, 84 °F or 28.9 °C
- Game attendance: 72,751
- Referee: Bob McElwee (95)
- TV announcers (CBS): Greg Gumbel, Phil Simms, and Armen Keteyian
- Recap, Game Book

Game information

**First quarter**

- BUF – Mike Hollis 52-yard field goal, 9:04. Bills 3–0. **Drive: 11 plays, 49 yards, 5:56.**

**Second quarter**

- BUF – Travis Henry 5-yard run (Mike Hollis kick), 12:25. Bills 10–0. **Drive: 10 plays, 80 yards, 5:31.**
- NYJ – Chad Morton 98-yard kickoff return (John Hall kick), 12:11. Bills 10–7. **Drive: 0 plays, 0 yards, 0:14.**
- NYJ – Anthony Becht 1-yard pass from Vinny Testaverde (John Hall kick), 9:12. Jets 14–10. **Drive: 3 plays, 19 yards, 1:36.**
- BUF – Travis Henry 3-yard run (Mike Hollis kick), 2:37. Bills 17–14. **Drive: 11 plays, 74 yards, 6:35.**
- NYJ – John Hall 34-yard field goal, 0:05. Tied 17–17. **Drive: 12 plays, 59 yards, 2:32.**

**Third quarter**

- NYJ – John Hall 45-yard field goal, 10:50. Jets 20–17. **Drive: 7 plays, 42 yards, 4:10.**
- BUF – Travis Henry 2-yard run, 0:58. Bills 24–20. **Drive: 6 plays, 29 yards, 3:26.**

**Fourth quarter**

- NYJ – John Hall 33-yard field goal, 9:25. Bills 24–23. **Drive: 4 plays, 9 yards, 1:30.**
- NYJ – Wayne Chrebet 18-yard pass from Vinny Testaverde (Vinny Testaverde–Anthony Becht pass), 4:47. Jets 31–24. **Drive: 4 plays, 60 yards, 1:35.**
- BUF – Eric Moulds 29-yard pass from Drew Bledsoe (Mike Hollis kick), 0:26. Tied 31–31. **Drive: 14 plays, 76 yards, 4:21.**

**Overtime**

- NYJ – Chad Morton 96-yard kickoff return, 14:46. Jets 37–31. **Drive: 0 plays, 0 yards, 0:14.**

**Top passers**

- NYJ – Vinny Testaverde – 24/30, 210 yards, 2 TD
- BUF – Drew Bledsoe – 26/39, 271 yards, TD, 2 INT

**Top rushers**

- NYJ – LaMont Jordan – 7 rushes, 32 yards
- BUF – Travis Henry – 31 rushes, 149 yards, 3 TD

**Top receivers**

- NYJ – Wayne Chrebet – 5 receptions, 58 yards, TD
- BUF – Eric Moulds – 8 receptions, 112 yards, TD

==== Week 2: at Minnesota Vikings ====
Week 2: Buffalo Bills (0–1) at Minnesota Vikings (0–1) – Game summary

Quarter	1	2	3	4	OT	Total
**Bills**	6	7	10	16	6	**45**
Vikings	3	10	13	13	0	**39**

at Hubert H. Humphrey Metrodome, Minneapolis, Minnesota

- Date: September 15, 2002
- Game time: 4:15 p.m. EDT, 3:15 p.m. CDT
- Game weather: None (indoor stadium)
- Game attendance: 64,047
- Referee: Ron Winter (14)
- TV announcers (CBS): Gus Johnson and Brent Jones
- Recap, Game Book

Game information

**First quarter**

- MIN – Doug Brien 29-yard field goal, 7:32. Vikings 3–0. **Drive: 11 plays, 53 yards, 4:30..**
- BUF – Mike Hollis 52-yard field goal, 3:56. Tied 3–3. **Drive: 8 plays, 46 yards, 3:36..**
- BUF – Mike Hollis 20-yard field goal, 0:30. Bills 6–3. **Drive: 6 plays, 25 yards, 2:25..**

**Second quarter**

- MIN – Daunte Culpepper 2-yard run (Doug Brien kick), 8:54. Vikings 10–6. **Drive: 11 plays, 72 yards, 6:36..**
- MIN – Doug Brien 22-yard field goal, 2:13. Vikings 13–6. **Drive: 12 plays, 69 yards, 4:54..**
- BUF – Josh Reed 9-yard pass from Drew Bledsoe (Mike Hollis kick), 1:06. Tied 13–13. **Drive: 6 plays, 82 yards, 1:07..**

**Third quarter**

- MIN – Randy Moss 2-yard pass from Daunte Culpepper (Doug Brien kick), 13:36. Vikings 20–13. **Drive: 2 plays, 3 yards, 0:40..**
- BUF – Charlie Rogers 90-yard kickoff return (Mike Hollis kick), 13:24. Tied 20–20. **Drive: 0 plays, 0 yards, 0:12..**
- BUF – Mike Hollis 20-yard field goal, 6:14. Bills 23–20. **Drive: 8 plays, 33 yards, 4:45..**
- MIN – D'Wayne Bates 29-yard pass from Daunte Culpepper (kick failed, wide left), 1:30. Vikings 26–23. **Drive: 8 plays, 63 yards, 4:44..**

**Fourth quarter**

- BUF – Ron Edwards fumble recovery in the end zone (Mike Hollis kick), 14:01. Bills 30–26.
- MIN – Derrick Alexander 5-yard pass from Daunte Culpepper (kick failed), 7:27. Vikings 32–30. **Drive: 13 plays, 82 yards, 6:34..**
- BUF – Peerless Price 3-yard pass from Drew Bledsoe (pass failed), 3:08. Bills 36–32. **Drive: 10 plays, 78 yards, 4:19..**
- MIN – Moe Williams 2-yard run (Doug Brien kick), 0:26. Vikings 39–36. **Drive: 10 plays, 60 yards, 2:42..**
- BUF – Mike Hollis 54-yard field goal, 0:00. Tied 39–39. **Drive: 4 plays, 29 yards, 0:26..**

**Overtime**

- BUF – Peerless Price 48-yard pass from Drew Bledsoe, 4:48. Bills 45–39. **Drive: 2 plays, 76 yards, 0:40..**

**Top passers**

- BUF – Drew Bledsoe – 35/49, 463 yards, 3 TD
- MIN – Daunte Culpepper – 25/45, 281 yards, 3 TD

**Top rushers**

- BUF – Travis Henry – 12 rushes, 30 yards
- MIN – Moe Williams – 17 rushes, 102 yards, TD

**Top receivers**

- BUF – Peerless Price – 13 receptions, 185 yards, 2 TD
- MIN – Randy Moss – 11 receptions, 111 yards, TD

==== Week 3: at Denver Broncos ====
Week 3: Buffalo Bills (1–1) at Denver Broncos (2–0) – Game summary

Quarter	1	2	3	4	Total
Bills	0	7	3	13	**23**
**Broncos**	7	7	7	7	**28**

at Invesco Field at Mile High, Denver, Colorado

- Date: September 22, 2002
- Game time: 4:05 pm
- Game weather: Sunny, 59 °F or 15 °C
- Game attendance: 75,359
- Referee: Walt Coleman (65)
- TV announcers (CBS): Kevin Harlan, Randy Cross and Beasley Reece
- Recap, Game Book

Game information

**First quarter**

- DEN – Chester McGlockton 24-yard fumble return (Jason Elam kick), 4:40. Broncos 7–0.

**Second quarter**

- DEN – Clinton Portis 1-yard run (Jason Elam kick), 9:51. Broncos 14–0. **Drive: 10 plays, 85 yards, 5:09.**
- BUF – Travis Henry 1-yard run (Mike Hollis kick), 2:54. Broncos 14–7. **Drive: 9 plays, 80 yards, 4:59.**

**Third quarter**

- BUF – Mike Hollis 38-yard field goal, 10:02. Broncos 14–10. **Drive: 10 plays, 68 yards, 5:02.**
- DEN – Dwayne Carswell 1-yard pass from Brian Griese (Jason Elam kick), 2:00. Broncos 21–10. **Drive: 11 plays, 80 yards, 5:22.**

**Fourth quarter**

- BUF – Josh Reed 4-yard pass from Drew Bledsoe (2 Pt failed), 7:40. Broncos 21–16. **Drive: 3 plays, 12 yards, 0:43.**
- DEN – Rod Smith 26-yard pass from Brian Griese (Jason Elam kick), 2:45. Broncos 28–16. **Drive: 10 plays, 80 yards, 4:56.**
- BUF – Eric Moulds 2-yard pass from Drew Bledsoe (Mike Hollis Kick), 1:40. Broncos 28–23. **Drive: 7 plays, 70 yards, 1:27.**

**Top passers**

- BUF – Drew Bledsoe – 27/41, 283 yards, 2 TD
- DEN – Brian Griese – 19/31, 211 yards, 2 TD

**Top rushers**

- BUF – Travis Henry – 12 rushes, 35 yards, TD
- DEN – Clinton Portis – 18 rushes, 103 yards, TD

**Top receivers**

- BUF – Eric Moulds – 9 receptions, 96 yards, TD
- DEN – Rod Smith – 7 receptions, 94 yards, TD

==== Week 4: vs. Chicago Bears ====
Week 4: Chicago Bears (2–1) at Buffalo Bills (1–2) – Game summary

Quarter	1	2	3	4	OT	Total
Bears	7	7	3	10	0	**27**
**Bills**	7	10	3	7	6	**33**

at Ralph Wilson Stadium, Orchard Park, New York

- Date: September 29, 2002
- Game time: 1:00 pm
- Game weather: Sunny, 66 °F or 18.9 °C
- Game attendance: 72,780
- Referee: Tom White (123)
- TV announcers (Fox): Kenny Albert, Tim Green and Bob Trimble
- Recap, Game Book

Game information

**First quarter**

- BUF – Peerless Price 2-yard pass from Drew Bledsoe (Mike Hollis kick), 10:55. Bills 7–0. **Drive: 7 plays, 75 yards, 4:12.**
- CHI – Mike Brown 62-yard fumble return (Paul Edinger kick), 3:00. Tied 7–7.

**Second quarter**

- BUF – Mike Hollis 48-yard field goal, 13:05. Bills 10–7. **Drive: 10 plays, 41 yards, 4:24.**
- BUF – Eric Moulds 4-yard pass from Drew Bledsoe (Mike Hollis kick), 5:55. Bills 17–7. **Drive: 8 plays, 76 yards, 4:59.**
- CHI – David Terrell 5-yard pass from Jim Miller (Paul Edinger kick), 0:34. Bills 17–14. **Drive: 9 plays, 77 yards, 4:08.**

**Third quarter**

- BUF – Mike Hollis 49-yard field goal, 11:30. Bills 20–14. **Drive: 5 plays, 13 yards, 2:13.**
- CHI – Paul Edinger 46-yard field goal, 6:55. Bills 20–17. **Drive: 4 plays, 6 yards, 0:45.**

**Fourth quarter**

- CHI – Paul Edinger 24-yard field goal, 12:51. Tied 20–20. **Drive: 8 plays, 64 yards, 2:42.**
- BUF – Dave Moore 1-yard pass from Drew Bledsoe (Mike Hollis kick), 9:30. Bills 27–20. **Drive: 6 plays, 78 yards, 3:44.**
- CHI – John Davis 4-yard pass from Jim Miller (Paul Edinger kick), 3:39. Tied 27–27. **Drive: 11 plays, 74 yards, 6:09.**

**Overtime**

- BUF – Travis Henry 26-yard pass from Drew Bledsoe, 13:15. Bills 33–27. **Drive: 2 plays, 56 yards, 0:53.**

**Top passers**

- CHI – Jim Miller – 19/31, 188 yards, 2 TD
- BUF – Drew Bledsoe – 28/36, 328 yards, 4 TD

**Top rushers**

- CHI – Anthony Thomas – 23 rushes, 48 yards
- BUF – Travis Henry – 12 rushes, 68 yards

**Top receivers**

- CHI – Marty Booker – 4 receptions, 82 yards
- BUF – Eric Moulds – 8 receptions, 124 yards, TD

==== Week 5: vs. Oakland Raiders ====
Week 5: Oakland Raiders (3–0) at Buffalo Bills (2–2) – Game summary

Quarter	1	2	3	4	Total
**Raiders**	7	14	7	21	**49**
Bills	0	21	10	0	**31**

at Ralph Wilson Stadium, Orchard Park, New York

- Date: October 6, 2002
- Game time: 1:00 pm
- Game weather: Sunny, 64 °F or 17.8 °C
- Game attendance: 73,038
- Referee: Bernie Kukar (86)
- TV announcers (CBS): Kevin Harlan, Randy Cross and Beasley Reece
- Recap, Game Book

Game information

**First quarter**

- OAK – Jerry Porter 29-yard pass from Rich Gannon (Sebastian Janikowski kick), 0:39. Raiders 7–0. **Drive: 10 plays, 75 yards, 4:25.**

**Second quarter**

- BUF – Peerless Price 2-yard pass from Drew Bledsoe (Mike Hollis kick), 9:48. Tied 7–7. **Drive: 11 plays, 80 yards, 5:51.**
- OAK – Rich Gannon 1-yard run (Sebastian Janikowski kick), 8:11. Raiders 14–7. **Drive: 5 plays, 70 yards, 1:37.**
- BUF – Dave Moore 2-yard pass from Drew Bledsoe (Mike Hollis kick), 6:42. Tied 14–14. **Drive: 4 plays, 80 yards, 1:29.**
- OAK – Charlie Garner 36-yard run (Sebastian Janikowski kick), 4:38. Raiders 21–14. **Drive: 5 plays, 75 yards, 2:04.**
- BUF – Larry Centers 5-yard run (Mike Hollis kick), 0:40. Tied 21–21. **Drive: 5 plays, 98 yards, 0:52.**

**Third quarter**

- BUF – Mike Hollis 30-yard field goal, 10:10. Bills 24–21. **Drive: 9 plays, 62 yards, 4:50.**
- OAK – Zack Crockett 1-yard run (Sebastian Janikowski kick), 6:17. Raiders 28–24. **Drive: 4 plays, 32 yards, 2:12.**
- BUF – Travis Henry 2-yard run (Mike Hollis kick), 2:19. Bills 31–28. **Drive: 8 plays, 80 yards, 3:58.**

**Fourth quarter**

- OAK – Charlie Garner 69-yard pass from Rich Gannon (Sebastian Janikowski kick), 11:18. Raiders 35–31. **Drive: 4 plays, 80 yards, 1:34.**
- OAK – Phillip Buchanon 81-yard interception return (Sebastian Janikowski kick), 8:02. Raiders 42–31.
- OAK – Jerry Rice 20-yard pass from Rich Gannon (Sebastian Janikowski kick), 4:20. Raiders 49–31. **Drive: 4 plays, 68 yards, 2:12.**

**Top passers**

- OAK – Rich Gannon – 23/38, 357 yards, 3 TD
- BUF – Drew Bledsoe – 32/53, 417 yards, 2 TD, 3 INT

**Top rushers**

- OAK – Charlie Garner – 8 rushes, 94 yards, TD
- BUF – Travis Henry – 15 rushes, 58 yards, TD

**Top receivers**

- OAK – Jerry Porter – 7 receptions, 117 yards, TD
- BUF – Peerless Price – 7 receptions, 126 yards, TD

==== Week 6: at Houston Texans ====
Week 6: Buffalo Bills (2–3) at Houston Texans (1–3) – Game summary

Quarter	1	2	3	4	Total
**Bills**	3	7	7	14	**31**
Texans	3	14	0	7	**24**

at Reliant Stadium, Houston, Texas

- Date: October 13, 2002
- Game time: 1:00 pm
- Game weather: None (indoor stadium) (roof closed)
- Game attendance: 70,120
- Referee: Ed Hochuli
- TV announcers (CBS): Don Criqui and Steve Tasker
- Recap Box Score

Game information

**First quarter**

- HOU – Kris Brown 26-yard field goal, 10:26 Texans 3–0. **Drive: 5 plays, 82 yards, 2:19.**
- BUF – Mike Hollis 33-yard field goal, 5:00 Tied 3–3. **Drive: 13 plays, 66 yards, 5:26.**

**Second quarter**

- HOU – Jabar Gaffney 26-yard pass from David Carr (Kris Brown kick), 10:31 Texans 10–3. **Drive: 9 plays, 70 yards, 4:34.**
- HOU – David Carr 17-yard run (Kris Brown kick), 5:04 Texans 17–3. **Drive: 7 plays, 63 yards, 4:04.**
- BUF – Travis Henry 1-yard run (Mike Hollis kick), 0:54 Texans 17–10. **Drive: 10 plays, 85 yards, 4:10.**

**Third quarter**

- BUF – Travis Henry 23-yard run (Mike Hollis kick), 6:32 Tied 17–17. **Drive: 11 plays, 95 yards, 5:10.**

**Fourth quarter**

- HOU – Billy Miller 5-yard pass from James Allen (Kris Brown kick), 14:10 Texans 24–17. **Drive: 2 plays, 8 yards, 0:24.**
- BUF – Eric Moulds 23-yard pass from Drew Bledsoe (Mike Hollis kick), 10:39 Tied 24–24. **Drive: 7 plays, 55 yards, 3:31.**
- BUF – Peerless Price 26-yard pass from Drew Bledsoe (Mike Hollis kick), 3:55 Bills 31–24. **Drive: 9 plays, 63 yards, 4:30.**

**Top passers**

- BUF – Drew Bledsoe – 19/33, 254 yards, 2 TD
- HOU – David Carr – 12/23, 218 yards, TD

**Top rushers**

- BUF – Travis Henry – 28 rushes, 159 yards, 2 TD
- HOU – Jonathan Wells – 12 rushes, 70 yards

**Top receivers**

- BUF – Peerless Price – 8 receptions, 121 yards, TD
- HOU – Corey Bradford – 5 receptions, 126 yards

==== Week 7: at Miami Dolphins ====
Week 7: Buffalo Bills (3–3) at Miami Dolphins (5–1) – Game summary

Quarter	1	2	3	4	Total
**Bills**	3	14	3	3	**23**
Dolphins	7	3	0	0	**10**

at Pro Player Stadium, Miami Gardens, Florida

- Date: October 20, 2002
- Game time: 1:00 pm
- Game weather: Sunny, 85 °F or 29.4 °C
- Game attendance: 73,180
- Referee: Johnny Grier (23)
- TV announcers (CBS): Dick Enberg, Dan Dierdorf, and Bonnie Bernstein
- Recap, Game Book

Game information

**First quarter**

- MIA – Randy McMichael 4-yard pass from Ray Lucas (Olindo Mare kick), 8:30. Dolphins 7–0. **Drive: 9 plays, 57 yards, 3:56.**
- BUF – Mike Hollis 46-yard field goal, 1:39. Dolphins 7–3. **Drive: 9 plays, 34 yards, 5:23.**

**Second quarter**

- BUF – Eric Moulds 70-yard pass from Drew Bledsoe (Mike Hollis kick), 12:40. Bills 10–7. **Drive: 2 plays, 76 yards, 0:47.**
- MIA – Olindo Mare 42-yard field goal, 4:57. Tied 10–10. **Drive: 13 plays, 46 yards, 7:43.**
- BUF – Nate Clements 29-yard interception return (Mike Hollis kick), 2:23. Bills 17–10.

**Third quarter**

- BUF – Mike Hollis 26-yard field goal, 4:16. Bills 20–10. **Drive: 7 plays, 58 yards, 3:32.**

**Fourth quarter**

- BUF – Mike Hollis 44-yard field goal, 1:12. Bills 23–10. **Drive: 9 plays, 23 yards, 4:07.**

**Top passers**

- BUF – Drew Bledsoe – 15/31, 182 yards, TD
- MIA – Ray Lucas – 13/33, 165 yards, TD, 4 INT

**Top rushers**

- BUF – Travis Henry – 22 rushes, 132 yards
- MIA – Ricky Williams – 25 rushes, 97 yards

**Top receivers**

- BUF – Larry Centers – 5 receptions, 51 yards
- MIA – James McKnight – 3 receptions, 42 yards

==== Week 8: vs. Detroit Lions ====
Week 8: Detroit Lions (2–4) at Buffalo Bills (4–3) – Game summary

Quarter	1	2	3	4	Total
Lions	0	14	0	3	**17**
**Bills**	7	7	10	0	**24**

at Ralph Wilson Stadium, Orchard Park, New York

- Date: October 27, 2002
- Game time: 1:00 pm
- Game weather: Cloudy, 47 °F or 8.3 °C
- Game attendance: 72,710
- Referee: Jeff Triplette (42)
- TV announcers (FOX): Ron Pitts, Tim Green and Bob Trimble
- Recap, Game Book

Game information

**First quarter**

- BUF – Travis Henry 5-yard run (Mike Hollis kick), 3:40. Bills 7–0. **Drive: 2 plays, 47 yards, 0:45.**

**Second quarter**

- DET – Az-Zahir Hakim 23-yard pass from Joey Harrington (Jason Hanson kick), 5:03. Tied 7–7. **Drive: 8 plays, 80 yards, 4:02.**
- DET – James Stewart 2-yard run (Jason Hanson kick), 3:00. Lions 14–7. **Drive: 5 plays, 22 yards, 2:03.**
- BUF – Peerless Price 59-yard pass from Drew Bledsoe (Mike Hollis kick), 1:04. Tied 14–14. **Drive: 5 plays, 73 yards, 1:56.**

**Third quarter**

- BUF – Mike Hollis 33-yard field goal, 11:09. Bills 17–14. **Drive: 6 plays, 32 yards, 2:44.**
- BUF – Travis Henry 5-yard run (Mike Hollis kick), 2:02. Bills 24–14. **Drive: 11 plays, 60 yards, 4:38.**

**Fourth quarter**

- DET – Jason Hanson 35-yard field goal, 3:07. Bills 24–17. **Drive: 7 plays, 46 yards, 2:54.**

**Top passers**

- DET – Joey Harrington – 20/42, 199 yards, TD, INT
- BUF – Drew Bledsoe – 21/36, 302 yards, TD

**Top rushers**

- DET – James Stewart – 24 rushes, 83 yards, TD
- BUF – Travis Henry – 19 rushes, 64 yards, 2 TD

**Top receivers**

- DET – James Stewart – 8 receptions, 53 yards
- BUF – Eric Moulds – 9 receptions, 123 yards

==== Week 9: vs. New England Patriots ====
Week 9: New England Patriots (3–4) at Buffalo Bills (5–3) – Game summary

Quarter	1	2	3	4	Total
**Patriots**	7	10	14	7	**38**
Bills	0	7	0	0	**7**

at Ralph Wilson Stadium, Orchard Park, New York

- Date: November 3, 2002
- Game time: 1:00 pm
- Game weather: Cloudy, 37 °F or 2.8 °C
- Game attendance: 73,448
- Referee: Dick Hantak (105)
- TV announcers (CBS): Greg Gumbel, Phil Simms and Armen Keteyian
- Recap, Game Book

Game information

**First quarter**

- NE – Christian Fauria 5-yard pass from Tom Brady (Adam Vinatieri kick), 10:27. Patriots 7–0. **Drive: 8 plays, 68 yards, 4:33.**

**Second quarter**

- NE – Antowain Smith 13-yard pass from Tom Brady (Adam Vinatieri kick), 12:54. Patriots 14–0. **Drive: 8 plays, 57 yards, 4:49.**
- NE – Adam Vinatieri 46-yard field goal, 3:49. Patriots 17–0. **Drive: 9 plays, 52 yards, 3:48.**
- BUF – Peerless Price 1-yard pass from Drew Bledsoe (Mike Hollis kick), 0:10. Patriots 17–7. **Drive: 16 plays, 80 yards, 3:39.**

**Third quarter**

- NE – Kevin Faulk 45-yard run (Adam Vinatieri kick), 7:33. Patriots 24–7. **Drive: 8 plays, 83 yards, 4:08.**
- NE – Antowain Smith 2-yard run (Adam Vinatieri kick), 0:54. Patriots 31–7. **Drive: 11 plays, 76 yards, 5:28.**

**Fourth quarter**

- NE – Antowain Smith 14-yard pass from Tom Brady (Adam Vinatieri kick), 6:52. Patriots 38–7. **Drive: 9 plays, 64 yards, 5:09.**

**Top passers**

- NE – Tom Brady – 22/26, 265 yards, 3 TD
- BUF – Drew Bledsoe – 28/45, 302 yards, TD, INT

**Top rushers**

- NE – Antowain Smith – 29 rushes, 111 yards, TD
- BUF – Travis Henry – 11 rushes, 53 yards

**Top receivers**

- NE – David Patten – 6 receptions, 88 yards
- BUF – Peerless Price – 9 receptions, 98 yards, TD

==== Week 11: at Kansas City Chiefs ====
Week 11: Buffalo Bills (5–4) at Kansas City Chiefs (4–5) – Game summary

Quarter	1	2	3	4	Total
Bills	0	13	3	0	**16**
**Chiefs**	7	3	0	7	**17**

at Arrowhead Stadium, Kansas City, Missouri

- Date: November 17, 2002
- Game time: 1:00 pm
- Game weather: Sunny, 48 °F or 8.9 °C
- Game attendance: 77,951
- Referee: Terry McAulay (77)
- TV announcers (CBS): Greg Gumbel, Phil Simms and Armen Keteyian
- Recap, Game Book

Game information

**First quarter**

- KC – Priest Holmes 4-yard run (Morten Andersen kick), 3:02. Chiefs 7–0. **Drive: 6 plays, 64 yards, 2:51.**

**Second quarter**

- BUF – Mike Hollis 23-yard field goal, 11:34. Chiefs 7–3. **Drive: 15 plays, 75 yards, 6:28.**
- BUF – Mike Hollis 33-yard field goal, 8:42. Chiefs 7–6. **Drive: 6 plays, 36 yards, 2:52.**
- KC – Morten Andersen 38-yard field goal, 6:40. Chiefs 10–6. **Drive: 6 plays, 49 yards, 2:02**
- BUF – Eric Moulds 7-yard pass from Drew Bledsoe (Mike Hollis kick), 0:32. Bills 13–10. **Drive: 15 plays, 85 yards, 6:08.**

**Third quarter**

- BUF – Mike Hollis 27-yard field goal, 2:29. Bills 16–10. **Drive: 15 plays, 71 yards, 8:14.**

**Fourth quarter**

- KC – Trent Green 9-yard run (Morten Andersen kick), 4:53. Chiefs 17–16. **Drive: 9 plays, 78 yards, 5:23.**

**Top passers**

- BUF – Drew Bledsoe – 24/36, 225 yards, TD, INT
- KC – Trent Green – 12/20, 197 yards

**Top rushers**

- BUF – Travis Henry – 24 rushes, 126 yards
- KC – Priest Holmes – 31 rushes, 104 yards, TD

**Top receivers**

- BUF – Josh Reed – 4 receptions, 44 yards
- KC – Eddie Kennison – 3 receptions, 93 yards

==== Week 12: at New York Jets ====
Week 12: Buffalo Bills (5–5) at New York Jets (5–5) – Game summary

Quarter	1	2	3	4	Total
Bills	3	0	10	0	**13**
**Jets**	3	14	7	7	**31**

at Giants Stadium, East Rutherford, New Jersey

- Date: November 24, 2002
- Game time: 1:00 pm
- Game weather: Sunny, 50 °F or 10 °C
- Game attendance: 78,745
- Referee: Ron Blum (7)
- TV announcers (CBS): Dick Enberg, Dan Dierdorf and Bonnie Bernstein
- Recap, Game Book

Game information

**First quarter**

- BUF – Mike Hollis 43-yard field goal, 8:31. Bills 3–0. **Drive: 13 plays, 55 yards, 6:34.**
- NYJ – John Hall 23-yard field goal, 3:20. Tied 3–3. **Drive: 10 plays, 58 yards, 5:32.**

**Second quarter**

- NYJ – LaMont Jordan 1-yard run (John Hall kick), 11:20. Jets 10–3. **Drive: 9 plays, 50 yards, 4:24.**
- NYJ – Curtis Martin 9-yard run (John Hall kick), 2:59. Jets 17–3. **Drive: 7 plays, 58 yards, 3:40.**

**Third quarter**

- NYJ – Laveranues Coles 11-yard pass from Chad Pennington (John Hall kick), 13:05. Jets 24–3. **Drive: 4 plays, 65 yards, 2:07.**
- BUF – Travis Henry 1-yard run (Mike Hollis kick), 8:05. Jets 24–10. **Drive: 9 plays, 69 yards, 5:00.**
- BUF – Mike Hollis 40-yard field goal, 1:41. Jets 24–13. **Drive: 10 plays, 67 yards, 4:44.**

**Fourth quarter**

- NYJ – Chad Pennington 1-yard run (John Hall kick), 9:55. Jets 31–13. **Drive: 11 plays, 65 yards, 6:52.**

**Top passers**

- BUF – Drew Bledsoe – 21/33, 181 yards, 2 INT
- NYJ – Chad Pennington – 15/24, 178 yards, TD

**Top rushers**

- BUF – Travis Henry – 17 rushes, 83 yards, TD
- NYJ – Curtis Martin – 21 rushes, 120 yards, TD

**Top receivers**

- BUF – Peerless Price – 6 receptions, 49 yards
- NYJ – Laveranues Coles – 7 receptions, 78 yards, TD

==== Week 13: vs. Miami Dolphins ====
Week 13: Miami Dolphins (7–4) at Buffalo Bills (5–6) – Game summary

Quarter	1	2	3	4	Total
Dolphins	14	0	7	0	**21**
**Bills**	3	14	14	7	**38**

at Ralph Wilson Stadium, Orchard Park, New York

- Date: December 1, 2002
- Game time: 1:00 pm
- Game weather: Snow, 25 °F or −3.9 °C
- Game attendance: 73,287
- Referee: Bill Carollo (63)
- TV announcers (CBS): Greg Gumbel, Phil Simms, and Armen Keteyian
- Recap, Game Book

Game information

**First quarter**

- MIA – Ricky Williams 45-yard run (Olindo Mare kick), 11:11. Dolphins 7–0. **Drive: 1 play, 45 yards, 0:09.**
- BUF – Mike Hollis 39-yard field goal, 6:01. Dolphins 7–3. **Drive: 12 plays, 54 yards, 5:10.**
- MIA – Jed Weaver 1-yard pass from Ray Lucas (Olindo Mare kick), 0:06. Dolphins 14–3. **Drive: 10 plays, 75 yards, 5:55.**

**Second quarter**

- BUF – Drew Bledsoe 2-yard run (Mike Hollis kick), 3:37. Dolphins 14–10. **Drive: 8 plays, 45 yards, 4:24.**
- BUF – Peerless Price 20-yard pass from Drew Bledsoe (Mike Hollis kick), 0:11. Bills 17–14. **Drive: 4 plays, 31 yards, 0:27.**

**Third quarter**

- MIA – Ricky Williams 55-yard run (Olindo Mare kick), 5:33. Dolphins 21–17. **Drive: 3 plays, 64 yards, 1:28.**
- BUF – Peerless Price 73-yard pass from Drew Bledsoe (Mike Hollis kick), 4:35. Bills 24–21. **Drive: 2 plays, 76 yards, 0;58.**
- BUF – Eric Moulds 57-yard pass from Drew Bledsoe (Mike Hollis kick), 2:01. Bills 31–21. **Drive: 1 play, 57 yards, 0:09.**

**Fourth quarter**

- BUF – Travis Henry 1-yard run (Mike Hollis kick), 10:30. Bills 38–21. **Drive: 7 plays, 61 yards, 4:19.**

**Top passers**

- MIA – Ray Lucas – 6/11, 40 yards, TD
- BUF – Drew Bledsoe – 15/27, 306 yards, 3 TD

**Top rushers**

- MIA – Ricky Williams – 27 carries, 228 yards, 2 TD
- BUF – Travis Henry – 35 carries, 151 yards, TD

**Top receivers**

- MIA – Jed Weaver – 2 receptions, 18 yards, TD
- BUF – Eric Moulds – 5 receptions, 130 yards, TD

==== Week 14: at New England Patriots ====
Week 14: Buffalo Bills (6–6) at New England Patriots (7–5) – Game summary

Quarter	1	2	3	4	Total
Bills	0	0	10	7	**17**
**Patriots**	17	3	0	7	**27**

at Gillette Stadium, Foxborough, Massachusetts

- Date: December 8, 2002
- Game time: 1:00 pm
- Game weather: Partly cloudy, 44 °F or 6.7 °C
- Game attendance: 68,436
- Referee: Jeff Triplette (42)
- TV announcers (CBS): Greg Gumbel, Phil Simms and Armen Keteyian
- Recap, Game Book

Game information

**First quarter**

- NE – Adam Vinatieri 39-yard field goal, 11:16. Patriots 3–0. **Drive: 7 plays, 42 yards, 3:44.**
- NE – David Patten 10-yard pass from Tom Brady (Adam Vinatieri kick), 3:35. Patriots 10–0. **Drive: 8 plays, 86 yards, 4:31.**
- NE – Donald Hayes 9-yard pass from Tom Brady (Adam Vinatieri kick), 3:14. Patriots 17–0. **Drive: 2 plays, 9 yards, 0:08.**

**Second quarter**

- NE – Adam Vinatieri 46-yard field goal, 2:31. Patriots 20–0. **Drive: 12 plays, 52 yards, 7:49.**

**Third quarter**

- BUF – Mike Hollis 26-yard field goal, 7:46. Patriots 20–3. **13 plays, 72 yards, 7:14.**
- BUF – Eric Moulds 12-yard pass from Drew Bledsoe (Mike Hollis kick), 4:15. Patriots 20–10. **Drive: 6 plays, 59 yards, 1:53.**

**Fourth quarter**

- NE – Antowain Smith 4-yard run (Adam Vinatieri kick), 10:06. Patriots 27–10. **Drive: 7 plays, 28 yards, 3:17.**
- BUF – Eric Moulds 4-yard pass from Drew Bledsoe (Mike Hollis kick), 1:05. Patriots 27–17. **Drive: 18 plays, 88 yards, 4:43.**

**Top passers**

- BUF – Drew Bledsoe – 32/51, 328 yards, 2 TD, 4 INT
- NE – Tom Brady – 15/27, 183 yards, 2 TD

**Top rushers**

- BUF – Travis Henry – 15 rushes, 60 yards
- NE – Antowain Smith – 17 rushes, 68 yards, TD

**Top receivers**

- BUF – Peerless Price – 9 receptions, 105 yards
- NE – Deion Branch – 1 reception, 41 yards

==== Week 15: vs. San Diego Chargers ====
Week 15: San Diego Chargers (8–5) at Buffalo Bills (6–7) – Game summary

Quarter	1	2	3	4	Total
Chargers	3	7	0	3	**13**
**Bills**	7	6	0	7	**20**

at Ralph Wilson Stadium, Orchard Park, New York

- Date: December 15, 2002
- Game time: 1:00 pm
- Game weather: Light rain, 37 °F or 2.8 °C
- Game attendance: 61,838
- Referee: Gerald Austin (34)
- TV announcers (CBS (Blacked out locally)): Ian Eagle and Solomon Wilcots
- Recap, Game Book

Game information

**First quarter**

- SD – Steve Christie 39-yard field goal, 6:49. Chargers 3–0. **Drive: 5 plays, 40 yards, 2:31.**
- BUF – Travis Henry 4-yard run (Mike Hollis kick), 3:13. Bills 7–3. **Drive: 7 plays, 74 yards, 3:36.**

**Second quarter**

- BUF – Mike Hollis 42-yard field goal, 9:05. Bills 10–3. **Drive: 7 plays, 41 yards, 2:57.**
- SD – LaDainian Tomlinson 2-yard run (Steve Christie kick), 3:21. Tied 10–10. **Drive: 9 plays, 83 yards, 5:44.**
- BUF – Mike Hollis 36-yard field goal, 1:08. Bills 13–10. **Drive: 7 plays, 17 yards, 2:13.**

**Third quarter**

- No scoring plays.

**Fourth quarter**

- SD – Steve Christie 53-yard field goal, 5:45. Tied 13–13. **Drive: 5 plays, 53 yards, 2:38.**
- BUF – Travis Henry 26-yard run (Mike Hollis kick), 0:52. Bills 20–13. **Drive: 7 plays, 64 yards, 2:12.**

**Top passers**

- SD – Drew Brees – 13/24, 148 yards
- BUF – Drew Bledsoe – 11/33, 107 yards

**Top rushers**

- SD – LaDainian Tomlinson – 28 rushes, 110 yards, TD
- BUF – Travis Henry – 22 rushes, 144 yards, 2 TD

**Top receivers**

- SD – Tim Dwight – 5 receptions, 81 yards
- BUF – Eric Moulds – 5 receptions, 61 yards

==== Week 16: at Green Bay Packers ====
Week 16: Buffalo Bills (7–7) at Green Bay Packers (11–3) – Game summary

Quarter	1	2	3	4	Total
Bills	0	0	0	0	**0**
**Packers**	0	3	0	7	**10**

at Lambeau Field, Green Bay, Wisconsin

- Date: December 22, 2002
- Game time: 1:00 pm
- Game weather: Snow flurries, 27 °F or −2.8 °C
- Game attendance: 64,106
- Referee: Tom White (123)
- TV announcers (CBS): Kevin Harlan, Randy Cross and Beasley Reece
- Recap, Game Book

Game information

**First quarter**

- No scoring plays.

**Second quarter**

- GB – Ryan Longwell 33-yard field goal, 3:57. Packers 3–0. **Drive: 10 plays, 37 yards, 4:15.**

**Third quarter**

- No scoring plays.

**Fourth quarter**

- GB – Donald Driver 11-yard pass from Brett Favre (Ryan Longwell kick), 7:23. Packers 10–0. **Drive: 4 plays, 39 yards, 1:30.**

**Top passers**

- BUF – Drew Bledsoe – 18/36, 179 yards, 2 INT
- GB – Brett Favre – 15/33, 114 yards, TD, 2 INT

**Top rushers**

- BUF – Travis Henry – 20 rushes, 46 yards
- GB – Ahman Green – 26 rushes, 116 yards

**Top receivers**

- BUF – Eric Moulds – 5 receptions, 45 yards
- GB – Donald Driver – 5 receptions, 52 yards, TD

==== Week 17: vs. Cincinnati Bengals ====
Week 17: Cincinnati Bengals (2–13) at Buffalo Bills (7–8) – Game summary

Quarter	1	2	3	4	Total
Bengals	0	3	0	6	**9**
**Bills**	6	14	7	0	**27**

at Ralph Wilson Stadium, Orchard Park, New York

- Date: December 29, 2002
- Game time: 1:00 pm
- Game weather: Cloudy, 35 °F or 1.7 °C
- Game attendance: 47,850
- Referee: Mike Carey (94)
- TV announcers (CBS (Blacked out locally)): Don Criqui and Steve Tasker
- Recap, Game Book

Game information

**First quarter**

- BUF – Mike Hollis 32-yard field goal, 8:36. Bills 3–0. **Drive: 11 plays, 80 yards, 5:15.**
- BUF – Mike Hollis 25-yard field goal, 1:12. Bills 6–0. **Drive: 4 plays, 4, yards, 1:32.**

**Second quarter**

- BUF – Drew Bledsoe 7-yard run (Mike Hollis kick), 10:25. Bills 13–0. **Drive: 9 plays, 55 yards, 4:15.**
- BUF – Eric Moulds 2-yard pass from Drew Bledsoe (Mike Hollis kick), 2:41. Bills 20–0. **Drive: 10 plays, 54 yards, 5:12.**
- CIN – Neil Rackers 19-yard field goal, 0:24. Bills 20–3. **Drive: 11 plays, 78 yards, 2:17.**

**Third quarter**

- BUF – Larry Centers 4-yard run (Mike Hollis kick), 1:37. Bills 27–3. **Drive: 9 plays, 58 yards, 4:11.**

**Fourth quarter**

- CIN – Jon Kitna 6-yard run (run failed), 8:05. Bills 27–9. **Drive: 7 plays, 71 yards, 2:49.**

**Top passers**

- CIN – Jon Kitna – 19/35, 241 yards, 2 INT
- BUF – Drew Bledsoe – 23/31, 231 yards, TD

**Top rushers**

- CIN – Corey Dillon – 13 rushes, 53 yards
- BUF – Travis Henry – 30 rushes, 80 yards

**Top receivers**

- CIN – Chad Johnson – 6 receptions, 123 yards
- BUF – Eric Moulds – 9 receptions, 75 yards, TD
