= Jermaine Lewis (American football, born 1979) =

American football player and coach (born 1979)

No. 1, 4
- Positions: Wide receiver, linebacker

Personal information
- Born: November 1, 1979 (age 47); Waukegan, Illinois, U.S.
- Listed height: 6 ft 4 in (1.93 m)
- Listed weight: 232 lb (105 kg)

Career information
- High school: Waukegan
- College: Western Michigan
- NFL draft: 2003: undrafted

Career history
- Detroit Lions (2003)*; San Francisco 49ers (2003)*; Tennessee Titans (2003)*; Houston Texans (2004)*; Frankfurt Galaxy (2004); Nashville Kats (2005–2006); Dallas Desperados (2007)*; Grand Rapids Rampage (2007–2008); Oklahoma City Yard Dawgz (2010); Cleveland Gladiators (2010)
- * Offseason or practice squad member only

Awards and highlights
- 2× Second-team All-MAC (2000, 2001); Ironman of the Game (June 23, 2007); All-Ironman Team (2008)

Career AFL statistics
- Receptions: 87
- Receiving yards: 911
- Receiving touchdowns: 15
- Total tackles: 63
- Interceptions: 3
- Stats at ArenaFan.com

Jermaine Lewis (born November 11, 1979) is an American former football wide receiver. He was originally signed as an undrafted free agent by the Detroit Lions in 2003. He played college football at Western Michigan.

Lewis was also a member of the San Francisco 49ers, Tennessee Titans, Houston Texans, Amsterdam Admirals, Nashville Kats, Dallas Desperados, Grand Rapids Rampage, Oklahoma City Yard Dawgz, and Cleveland Gladiators.

== Early life ==
Lewis attended Waukegan High School, where he was an All-state and All-County selection for football. He also lettered in basketball and track. His nickname in high school was J-Lew. His childhood heroes were Michael Jordan and Bo Jackson.

== College career ==
Lewis attended Western Michigan where he was a safety and wide receiver on the football team and was also a three-year sprinter (2000–2002) and a four-time Central Collegiate Conference champion in track and field.

As a sophomore in 2000, Lewis was a Second-team All-MAC selection after leading Western Michigan in tackles-for-loss with eight. As a junior in 2001, he finished second on the team with 77 tackles as well as two interceptions. A performance which earned him Second-team All-MAC honors as a Safety. As a senior in 2002, he switched to Wide Receiver and recorded 38 receptions for a team-leading 654 yards and four touchdowns.

== Professional career ==
=== National Football League (2003–2004) ===
Lewis went unselected in the 2003 NFL draft. However, he was signed as an undrafted free agent by the Detroit Lions, but was released before the regular season. He was then signed to the practice squad of the San Francisco 49ers, and then the Tennessee Titans. Then in 2004, he was signed by the Houston Texans and allocated to the Frankfurt Galaxy of NFL Europe.

=== Arena Football League (2005–2010) ===
On October 4, 2004, Lewis signed with the Nashville Kats of the Arena Football League. He played his first two Arena football seasons for the Kats where he recorded 24 receptions for 233 yards and four touchdowns on offense, as well as 13 tackles, one sack, two forced fumbles, and one interception (returned 31 yards for a touchdown), on defense. Then in 2007, he signed with the Dallas Desperados and spent some time on their practice squad, however, on February 26, 2007, he was traded to the Grand Rapids Rampage in exchange for wide receiver Jon Rodriguez. On August 15, 2007, he signed a three-year contract with the Rampage. He played the next two seasons with the Rampage, recording 63 receptions for 678 yards, and 11 touchdowns on offense, as well as 50 tackles, four passes defensed, two forced fumbles, and two interceptions (returned for a total of two yards) on defense. After the end of the regular season, it was announced that he had been named to the 2008 AFL All-Ironman team. Then on December 2, 2008, he was released by the Rampage.

Lewis next played for the Amiens Spartiates (Top French league) as a wide receiver.

Currently he is an assistant coach at Central Methodist University.

== Personal life ==
Lewis has one child, Je'Taeia. His favorite movies are Scarface or Troy. He has said his top football memory is his first game in college as a wide receiver, a game in which he recorded four receptions for 124 yards and a touchdown. He also likes to play chess and Scrabble. He is also scared of heights.

== See also ==
- List of National Football League and Arena Football League players
