= Davenport Panthers football, 2016–present =

American college football season

2016–present Davenport Panthers football
- Conference: Great Lakes Intercollegiate Athletic Conference
- Head coach: Lou Esposito (2016); Sparky McEwen (2017– )
- Home stadium: Farmers Insurance Athletic Complex

The Davenport Panthers football program represented Davenport University ("Davenport") in college football during the earliest years of the school's participation in intercollegiate football from 2016 to the present.

Davenport passed a resolution in November 2013 to plan for the development of an intercollegiate football team. The school hired Lou Esposito as the program's first head coach in May 2014 and built a football stadium on land donated by Farmers Insurance Group. The school fielded its first team in 2016, competing as an independent in the National Association of Intercollegiate Athletics and compiling a 6–5 record. Esposito left Davenport after the 2016 season. In February 2017, Davenport hired Ferris State assistant coach Sparky McEwen as its new head coach. Also for the 2017 season, Davenport moved to NCAA Division II as a member of the Great Lakes Intercollegiate Athletic Conference (GLIAC). McEwen led the Panthers to their best seasons in 2023 (8–3) and 2024 (8–2), with the 2023 team receiving the program's first (and as of 2025 only) berth in the NCAA Division II playoffs. McEwen remains Davenport's head coach as of the 2025 season.

Davenport plays its home games at the Farmers Insurance Athletic Complex located on the school's campus in Caledonia Township, Michigan.

== Overview ==
Year	Head coach	Overall record	Conf. record	Conf. rank	Points scored	Points allowed	Delta
2016	Lou Esposito	6–5	na	na	246	175	+71
2017	Sparky McEwen	1–10	0–9	10	128	329	-201
2018	Sparky McEwen	6–5	3–5	5 (tie)	244	230	+14
2019	Sparky McEwen	5–5	3–5	5 (tie)	181	233	-52
2021	Sparky McEwen	3–8	2–5	5 (tie)	104	285	-181
2022	Sparky McEwen	8–3	4–2	3	336	322	+14
2023	Sparky McEwen	8–2	4–2	3	276	199	+77
2024	Sparky McEwen	7–4	4–3	3 (tie)	257	233	+24
TOTAL		44–42	20–31				

== Planning for new program ==
In November 2013, under the leadership of athletic director Paul Lowden, Davenport passed a resolution to develop a plan for a football program. Preparations for fielding a football team proceeded in 2014 and 2015, including:

- Farmers Insurance Group donated 45 acres for the construction of a football stadium that would also include a track and would also host Davenport's soccer and rugby teams. The site also included parking, a concourse, and a concession stand and ticket sales building.
- Lou Esposito was hired as the school's first head football coach in May 2014, more than two years before the first game was played. Esposito had been a defensive coordinator at Ferris State and prior to that the defensive line coach at Western Michigan. (Esposito now serves as the defensive line coach at Michigan.)
- Steve Casula was added as the offensive coordinator in August 2014. (Casula now serves as co-offensive coordinator at Michigan.)
- A group of 95 freshmen began practice and scrimmages beginning in August 2015 and continuing through the fall.

== 2016 ==
2016 Davenport Panthers football
- Conference: Independent
- Record: 6–5
- Head coach: Lou Esposito (1st season)

The 2016 Davenport Panthers football team represented Davenport University as an independent during the 2016 NAIA football season. In their first year of intercollegiate football, and their first and only under head coach Lou Esposito, the Panthers compiled a 6–5 record and outscored opponents by a total of 278 to 175.

The team did not have a senior and was made up mostly of freshmen or redshirt freshmen. True freshman Hunter Krause of Fairfield, Ohio, was the team's starting quarterback. Eighteen of the 22 starters were freshmen. The only two players with college game experience were receiver Herman Brunis, a transfer from Ohio University, and linebacker Brent Showers, a transfer from Northern MIchigan.

On October 23, a non-student shooter opened fire on football players in a university dormitory. One football player, Braden Schrotenboer, was shot in his hand.

=== Schedule ===
Date	Opponent	Site	Result	Attendance	Source
August 27	Taylor	Farmers Insurance Athletic Complex; Caledonia Township, MI	L 28–41	1,600	
September 3	at Kentucky Christian	Knights Stadium; Grayson, KY	W 59–0	950	
September 10	at Tiffin	Frost Krasnow; Tiffin, OH	L 17–20	3,125	
September 17	Kentucky Wesleyan	Farmers Insurance Athletic Complex; Caledonia Township, MI	W 41–7	1,432	
September 24	Arizona Christian^{†}	Farmers Insurance Athletic Complex; Caledonia Township, MI	W 20–7	1,604	
October 1	at Saint Xavier	Chicago, IL	W 20–7	1,500	
October 8	University of Faith	Farmers Insurance Athletic Complex; Caledonia Township, MI	W 32–0	773	
October 15	at St. Francis (IL)	Joliet, IL	L 21–24	1,025	
October 22	Quincy	Farmers Insurance Athletic Complex; Caledonia Township, MI	W 14–10	1,311	
October 29	St. Joseph's (IN)	Farmers Insurance Athletic Complex; Caledonia Township, MI	L 20–24	1,694	
November 5	No. 4 St. Francis (IN)	Farmers Insurance Athletic Complex; Caledonia Township, MI	L 6–35	1,213	
^{†}Homecoming; Rankings from Coaches' Poll released prior to the game

== 2017 ==
2017 Davenport Panthers football
- Conference: Great Lakes Intercollegiate Athletic Conference
- Record: 1–10 (0–9 GLIAC)
- Head coach: Sparky McEwen (1st season)

2017 Great Lakes Intercollegiate Athletic Conference football standings
	Conf.			Overall
Team	W		L	W		L
No. 10 Ashland $^	9	–	0	11	–	2
No. 5 Ferris State ^	8	–	1	11	–	2
Grand Valley State	7	–	2	8	–	3
Tiffin	5	–	4	6	–	5
Northwood	5	–	4	7	–	4
Wayne State (MI)	4	–	5	5	–	6
Michigan Tech	3	–	6	4	–	7
Saginaw Valley State	3	–	6	5	–	6
Northern Michigan	1	–	8	1	–	9
Davenport *	0	–	9	1	–	10
$ – Conference champion; ^ – NCAA Division II playoff participant; * – Provisional Division II member; Rankings from AFCA poll

The 2017 Davenport Panthers football team represented Davenport University as a member of the Great Lakes Intercollegiate Athletic Conference (GLIAC) during the 2017 NCAA Division II football season. In their second year of intercollegiate football, and the first year under head coach Sparky McEwen, the Panthers compiled a 1–10 record (0–9 in conference games), finished in last place in the GLIAC, and were outscored by a total of 329 to 128.

On offense, the Panthers gained 1,684 rushing yards and 1,269 passing yards. On defense, they allowed opponents 2,259 rushing yards and 1,565 passing yards. The individual leaders were Holden Majewski (667 passing yards), William Gist (373 rushing yards), and Deondre Moore (24 receptions for 316 yards).

=== Schedule ===
Date	Time	Opponent	Site	Result	Attendance	Source
August 31	7:00 p.m.	Concordia (MI)*	Farmers Insurance Athletic Complex; Caledonia Township, MI	L 6–25	1,637	
September 9	7:00 p.m.	at No. 14 Grand Valley State	Lubbers Stadium; Allendale, MI	L 0–48	16,734	
September 16	12:00 p.m.	Tiffin	Farmers Insurance Athletic Complex; Caledonia Township, MI	L 14–27	1,135	
September 23	1:30 p.m.	at Northern Michigan	Superior Dome; Marquette, MI	L 14–24	3,971	
September 30	12:05 p.m.	No. 20 Ashland	Farmers Insurance Athletic Complex; Caledonia Township, MI	L 0–38	894	
October 7	3:00 p.m.	at Saginaw Valley State	Wickes Stadium; University Center, MI	L 0–33	2,485	
October 14	1:05 p.m.	McKendree^{†}	Farmers Insurance Athletic Complex; Caledonia Township, MI	W 27–24 ^{2OT}	694	
October 21	1:00 p.m.	at Northwood	Hantz Stadium; Midland, MI	L 30–33 ^{2OT}	1,827	
October 28	1:00 p.m.	at Michigan Tech	Sherman Field; Houghton, MI	L 10–17	788	
November 4	12:05 p.m.	No. 12 Ferris State	Farmers Insurance Athletic Complex; Caledonia Township, MI	L 0–26	802	
November 11	12:00 p.m.	Wayne State (MI)	Farmers Insurance Athletic Complex; Caledonia Township, MI	L 27–34 ^{OT}	1,044	
*Non-conference game; ^{†}Homecoming; Rankings from AFCA Poll released prior to the game; All times are in Eastern time

== 2018 ==
2018 Davenport Panthers football
- Conference: Great Lakes Intercollegiate Athletic Conference
- Record: 6–5 (3–5 GLIAC)
- Head coach: Sparky McEwen (2nd season)

2018 Great Lakes Intercollegiate Athletic Conference football standings
	Conf.			Overall
Team	W		L	W		L
No. 2 Ferris State $^	8	–	0	15	–	1
No. 14 Grand Valley State ^	7	–	1	10	–	2
Ashland	6	–	2	6	–	4
Saginaw Valley State	5	–	3	8	–	3
Davenport *	3	–	5	6	–	5
Northwood	3	–	5	3	–	7
Michigan Tech	2	–	6	4	–	6
Northern Michigan	1	–	7	3	–	8
Wayne State (MI)	1	–	7	2	–	9
$ – Conference champion; ^ – NCAA Division II playoff participant; * – Provisional NCAA Division II member; Rankings from AFCA poll

The 2018 Davenport Panthers football team represented Davenport University as a member of the Great Lakes Intercollegiate Athletic Conference (GLIAC) during the 2018 NCAA Division II football season. In their second year under head coach Sparky McEwen, the Panthers compiled a 6–5 record (3–5 in conference games), tied for fifth place in the GLIAC, and outscored opponents by a total of 244 to 230.

=== Schedule ===
Date	Time	Opponent	Site	Result	Attendance	Source
September 1	4:05 p.m.	at Robert Morris (IL)*	Morris Field; Arlington Heights, IL	W 44–7	750	
September 8	12:00 p.m.	No. 4 D-III Wisconsin-Oshkosh*	Farmers Insurance Athletic Complex; Caledonia Township, MI	W 7–3	890	
September 15	1:00 p.m.	at Michigan Tech	Sherman Field; Houghton, MI	W 23–21	1,808	
September 22	1:00 p.m.	at Quincy*	QU Stadium; Quincy, IL	W 26–10	1,000	
September 29	12:05 p.m.	Northern Michigan^{†}	Farmers Insurance Athletic Complex; Caledonia Township, MI	W 31–30 ^{OT}	1,844	
October 6	6:07 p.m.	at Wayne State (MI)	Tom Adams Field; Detroit, MI	W 37–14	1,524	
October 13	1:00 p.m.	at Northwood	Hantz Stadium; Midland, MI	L 22–30	1,815	
October 20	12:55 p.m.	No. 8 Grand Valley State	Farmers Insurance Athletic Complex; Caledonia Township, MI	L 14–19	2,400	
October 27	12:05 p.m.	Ashland	Farmers Insurance Athletic Complex; Caledonia Township, MI	L 6–31	592	
November 3	1:00 p.m.	at No. 2 Ferris State	Top Taggart Field; Big Rapids, MI	L 17–41	3,014	
November 10	12:20 p.m.	Saginaw Valley State	Farmers Insurance Athletic Complex; Caledonia Township, MI	L 17–24 ^{OT}	651	
*Non-conference game; ^{†}Homecoming; Rankings from AFCA Poll released prior to the game; All times are in Eastern time

== 2019 ==
2019 Davenport Panthers football
- Conference: Great Lakes Intercollegiate Athletic Conference
- Record: 5–5 (3–5 GLIAC)
- Head coach: Sparky McEwen (3rd season)
- Home stadium: Farmers Insurance Athletic Complex

2019 Great Lakes Intercollegiate Athletic Conference football standings
	Conf.			Overall
Team	W		L	W		L
No. 3 Ferris State $^	8	–	0	12	–	1
Wayne State (MI)	7	–	1	8	–	3
Ashland	6	–	2	7	–	4
Grand Valley State	5	–	3	8	–	3
Davenport	3	–	5	5	–	5
Michigan Tech	3	–	5	5	–	5
Saginaw Valley State	3	–	5	5	–	6
Northwood	1	–	7	1	–	10
Northern Michigan	0	–	8	1	–	9
$ – Conference champion; ^ – NCAA Division II playoff participant; Rankings from AFCA poll

The 2019 Davenport Panthers football team represented Davenport University as a member of the Great Lakes Intercollegiate Athletic Conference (GLIAC) during the 2019 NCAA Division II football season. In their third year under head coach Sparky McEwen, the Panthers compiled a 5–5 record (3–5 in conference games), tied for fifth place in the GLIAC, and were outscored by a total of 233 to 181.

=== Schedule ===
Date	Time	Opponent	Site	Result	Attendance	Source
September 14	2:00 p.m.	at Lake Erie*	Jack Britt Memorial Stadium; Painesville, OH	W 13–9	717	
September 21	1:00 p.m.	at Northern Michigan	Superior Dome; Marquette, MI	W 21–7	3,611	
September 28	12:00 p.m.	Lindenwood*^{†}	Farmers Insurance Athletic Complex; Caledonia Township, MI	W 35–24	1,562	
October 5	12:05 p.m.	No. 2 Ferris State	Farmers Insurance Athletic Complex; Caledonia Township, MI	L 7–35	1,612	
October 12	1:00 p.m.	at Ashland	Jack Miller Stadium; Ashland, OH	L 27–30	3,207	
October 19	12:05 p.m.	Michigan Tech	Farmers Insurance Athletic Complex; Caledonia Township, MI	L 17–30	1,242	
October 26	7:05 p.m.	at No. 16 Grand Valley State	Lubbers Stadium; Allendale, MI	L 7–27	5,262	
November 2	12:05 p.m.	Wayne State (MI)	Farmers Insurance Athletic Complex; Caledonia Township, MI	L 0–34	1,029	
November 9	12:05 p.m.	Northwood	Farmers Insurance Athletic Complex; Caledonia Township, MI	W 21–14	1,344	
November 16	1:00 p.m.	at Saginaw Valley State	Wickes Stadium; University Center, MI	W 33–23	1,750	
*Non-conference game; ^{†}Homecoming; Rankings from AFCA Poll released prior to the game; All times are in Eastern time

== 2020 ==
The 2020 season was cancelled due to the COVID-19 pandemic.

== 2021 ==
2021 Davenport Panthers football
- Conference: Great Lakes Intercollegiate Athletic Conference
- Record: 3–8 (2–5 GLIAC)
- Head coach: Sparky McEwen (4th season)

2021 Great Lakes Intercollegiate Athletic Conference football standings
	Conf.			Overall
Team	W		L	W		L
No. 1 Ferris State $^	7	–	0	14	–	0
No. 7 Grand Valley State ^	6	–	1	10	–	2
Michigan Tech	5	–	2	6	–	4
Saginaw Valley State	4	–	3	7	–	4
Northern Michigan	2	–	5	4	–	7
Davenport	2	–	5	3	–	8
Wayne State (MI)	2	–	5	2	–	9
Northwood	0	–	7	1	–	9
$ – Conference champion; ^ – NCAA Division II playoff participant; Rankings from AFCA Poll

The 2021 Davenport Panthers football team represented Davenport University as a member of the Great Lakes Intercollegiate Athletic Conference (GLIAC) during the 2021 NCAA Division II football season. In their fourth year under head coach Sparky McEwen, the Panthers compiled a 3–8 record (2–5 in conference games), finished a three-way tie for fifth place in the GLIAC, and were outscored by a total of 285 to 104.

The team's statistical leaders included Deondre Ford (577 passing yards), Jaier Harden (348 rushing yards), Amonte Phillips (28 receptions for 334 yards), and Bryan Plegue (30 points scored on 12 extra points and six field goals). The team also featured linebacker Elysee Mbem-Bosse, a former four-star recruit and Central Africa native who tansferred to Davenport after being dismissed from the Michigan Wolverines football program in late 2017.

=== Schedule ===
Date	Time	Opponent	Site	Result	Attendance	Source
September 4	12:05 p.m.	Truman State*	Farmers Insurance Athletic Complex; Caledonia Township, MI	L 14–31	1,266	
September 11	12:00 p.m.	at Walsh*	Bob Commings Field; Canton, OH	W 10–6	754	
September 18	1:00 p.m.	at Northern Michigan	Superior Dome; Marquette, MI	L 14–20	1,536	
September 25	3:00 p.m.	at No. 3 Ferris State	Top Taggart Field; Big Rapids, MI (rivalry)	L 0–38	6,636	
October 2	1:00 p.m.	at Michigan Tech	Sherman Field; Houghton, MI	L 7–31	1,700	
October 9	12:05 p.m.	Northern Michigan^{†}	Farmers Insurance Athletic Complex; Caledonia Township, MI	W 18–13	1,202	
October 16	12:05 p.m.	Wayne State	Farmers Insurance Athletic Complex; Caledonia Township, MI	L 3–16	688	
October 23	1:00 p.m.	at Northwood	Hantz Football Stadium; Midland, MI	W 21–14	1,115	
October 30	12:00 p.m.	Saginaw Valley State	Farmers Insurance Athletic Complex; Caledonia Township, MI	L 3–24	1,050	
November 6	12:00 p.m.	No. 1 Ferris State	Farmers Insurance Athletic Complex; Caledonia Township, MI	L 14–50	1,266	
November 13	1:00 p.m.	at No. 5 Grand Valley State	Lubbers Stadium; Allendale, MI	L 0–42	8,483	
*Non-conference game; ^{†}Homecoming; Rankings from AFCA Poll released prior to the game; All times are in Eastern time

== 2022 ==
2022 Davenport Panthers football

NCAA Division II playoffs (first round), L 7-41 vs. Ferris State
- Conference: Great Lakes Intercollegiate Athletic Conference
- Record: 8–3 (4–2 GLIAC)
- Head coach: Sparky McEwen (5th season)

2022 Great Lakes Intercollegiate Athletic Conference football standings
	Conf.			Overall
Team	W		L	W		L
No. 3 Grand Valley State $^	6	–	0	12	–	1
No. 1 Ferris State ^	5	–	1	14	–	1
No. 20 Davenport ^	4	–	2	8	–	3
Saginaw Valley State	3	–	3	8	–	3
Michigan Tech	2	–	4	4	–	7
Northern Michigan	1	–	5	4	–	7
Wayne State (MI)	0	–	6	1	–	9
$ – Conference champion; ^ – NCAA Division II playoff participant; Rankings from AFCA Poll

The 2022 Davenport Panthers football team represented Davenport University as a member of the Great Lakes Intercollegiate Athletic Conference (GLIAC) during the 2022 NCAA Division II football season. In their fifth year under head coach Sparky McEwen, the Panthers compiled an 8–3 record (4–2 in conference games), finished in third place in the GLIAC, and outscored opponents by a total of 336 to 322. The team opened the season with eight consecutive victories, the most victories in program history. For the first time in school history, the team participated in the NCAA Division II playoffs, losing to Ferris State in the first round.

The team was led on offense by quarterback Jason Whittaker, a Rockford, Michigan, native who transferred from Northwestern. Whittaker completed 185 of 346 passes for 2,309 yards, 26 touchdowns, 11 interceptions, and a 127.96 passer rating.

The team's other statistical leaders included Sy Barnett (694 receiving yards), Caleef Jenkins (575 rushing yards), and Brandon Gielow (65 points scored on 38 extra points and nine field goals).

=== Schedule ===
Date	Time	Opponent	Site	TV	Result	Attendance	Source
September 3	12:00 p.m.	at Truman State*	Stokes Stadium; Kirksville, MO		W 20–19	2,800	
September 17	12:00 p.m.	Northern Michigan	Farmers Insurance Athletic Complex; Caledonia Township, MI		W 31–21	1,366	
September 24	2:00 p.m.	Northwood*^{†}	Farmers Insurance Athletic Complex; Caledonia Township, MI		W 51–17	1,822	
October 1	1:00 p.m.	Michigan Tech	Farmers Insurance Athletic Complex; Caledonia Township, MI	FloSports	W 52–38	1,622	
October 8	1:00 p.m.	at Northern Michigan	Superior Dome; Marquette, MI		W 27–24 ^{OT}	1,143	
October 15	12:00 p.m.	Wayne State (MI)	Farmers Insurance Athletic Complex; Caledonia Township, MI		W 47–43	1,277	
October 22	12:00 p.m.	Lincoln (CA)*	Farmers Insurance Athletic Complex; Caledonia Township, MI		W 58–14	1,300	
October 29	1:00 p.m.	at No. 23 Saginaw Valley State	Wickes Stadium; University Center, MI		W 29–28	1,920	
November 5	1:00 p.m.	at No. 7 Ferris State	Top Taggart Field; Big Rapids, MI		L 7–28	3,600	
November 12	12:00 p.m.	No. 1 Grand Valley State	Farmers Insurance Athletic Complex; Caledonia Township, MI	FloSports	L 7–49	2,888	
November 19	1:00 p.m.	at No. 5 Ferris State*	Top Taggart Field; Big Rapids, MI (NCAA Division II playoffs, first round)		L 7–41	1,107	
*Non-conference game; ^{†}Homecoming; Rankings from AFCA Poll released prior to the game; All times are in Eastern time

== 2023 ==
2023 Davenport Panthers football
- Conference: Great Lakes Intercollegiate Athletic Conference
- Record: 8–2 (4–2 GLIAC)
- Head coach: Sparky McEwen (6th season)

2023 Great Lakes Intercollegiate Athletic Conference football standings
	Conf.			Overall
Team	W		L	W		L
No. 3 Grand Valley State $^	6	–	0	11	–	2
No. 9 Ferris State ^	5	–	1	8	–	3
Davenport	4	–	2	8	–	2
Saginaw Valley State	3	–	3	6	–	5
Wayne State (MI)	2	–	4	3	–	8
Michigan Tech	1	–	5	5	–	5
Northern Michigan	0	–	6	0	–	11
$ – Conference champion; ^ – NCAA Division II playoff participant; Rankings from AFCA poll

The 2023 Davenport Panthers football team represented Davenport University as a member of the Great Lakes Intercollegiate Athletic Conference (GLIAC) during the 2023 NCAA Division II football season. In their sixth year under head coach Sparky McEwen, the Panthers compiled an 8–2 record (4–2 in conference games), finished in third place in the GLIAC, and outscored opponents by a total of 336 to 322.

The team's statistical leaders included Jason Whittaker (1,812 passing yards, 14 touchdown passes, 127.94 passer rating), Peyton Brown (34 receptions for 551 yards), Myren Harris (976 rushing yards), and Brandon Gielow (59 points scored on 29 extra points and 10 touchdowns).

=== Schedule ===
Date	Time	Opponent	Rank	Site	TV	Result	Attendance	Source
September 2	12:00 p.m.	Thomas More*		Farmers Insurance Athletic Complex; Caledonia Township, MI		W 31–17	1,433	
September 9	12:00 p.m.	Bowie State*		Farmers Insurance Athletic Complex; Caledonia Township, MI		W 24–19	1,304	
September 23	12:00 p.m.	William Jewell*	No. 21	Farmers Insurance Athletic Complex; Caledonia Township, MI		W 55–27	1,500	
September 30	1:00 p.m.	at Michigan Tech	No. 18	Kearly Stadium; Houghton, MI	FloSports	W 28–0	2,600	
October 7	2:00 p.m.	Northern Michigan^{†}	No. 16	Farmers Insurance Athletic Complex; Caledonia Township, MI		W 28–12	1,666	
October 14	6:00 p.m.	at Wayne State (MI)	No. 16	Tom Adams Field; Detroit, MI		W 32–3	1,738	
October 21	12:00 p.m.	at University of Mary*	No. 13	MDU Resources Community Bowl; Bismarck, ND		W 44–34	1,773	
October 28	12:00 p.m.	Saginaw Valley State	No. 11	Farmers Insurance Athletic Complex; Caledonia Township, MI		W 24–21	1,112	
November 4	12:00 p.m.	No. 7 Ferris State	No. 9	Farmers Insurance Athletic Complex; Caledonia Township, MI	FloSports	L 10–28	2,150	
November 11	1:00 p.m.	at No. 2–T Grand Valley State	No. 16	Lubbers Stadium; Allendale, MI		L 0–38	10,259	
*Non-conference game; ^{†}Homecoming; Rankings from AFCA Poll released prior to the game; All times are in Eastern time

== 2024 ==
2024 Davenport Panthers football
- Conference: Great Lakes Intercollegiate Athletic Conference
- Record: 7–4 (4–3 GLIAC)
- Head coach: Sparky McEwen (7th season)

2024 Great Lakes Intercollegiate Athletic Conference football standings
	Conf.			Overall
Team	W		L	W		L
No. 1 Ferris State $^	7	–	0	14	–	1
No. 6 Grand Valley State ^	6	–	1	11	–	2
Davenport	4	–	3	7	–	4
Michigan Tech	4	–	3	7	–	4
Saginaw Valley State	4	–	3	7	–	4
Wayne State (MI)	2	–	5	2	–	9
Roosevelt*	1	–	6	1	–	9
Northern Michigan	0	–	7	0	–	11
$ – Conference champion; ^ – NCAA Division II playoff participant; * – Roosevelt ineligible for postseason play due to transition from NAIA; Rankings from AFCA poll

The 2024 Davenport Panthers football team represented Davenport University as a member of the Great Lakes Intercollegiate Athletic Conference (GLIAC) during the 2024 NCAA Division II football season. In their seventh year under head coach Sparky McEwen, the Panthers compiled a 7–4 record (4–3 in conference games), finished in a three-way tie for third place in the GLIAC, and outscored opponents by a total of 257 to 233.

The team's statistical leaders included Myren Harris (849 rushing yards), Mike O'Horo (1,010 passing yards), Preston Smith (36 receptions for 430 yards), and Brandon Gielow (67 points on 31 extra points and 12 field goals).

=== Schedule ===
Date	Time	Opponent	Site	Result	Attendance	Source
September 7	12:00 p.m.	at Thomas More*	Republic Bank Field; Crestview Hills, KY	W 24–17	1,457	
September 14	11:00 a.m.	at Bowie State*	Bulldog Stadium; Bowie, MD	W 17–14	1,303	
September 21	12:00 p.m.	No. 11 Central Missouri*	Farmers Insurance Athletic Complex; Caledonia Township, MI	L 31–32	1,202	
September 28	1:00 p.m.	at William Jewell*	Greene Stadium; Liberty, MO	W 17–7	450	
October 5	12:00 p.m.	No. 2 Grand Valley State	Farmers Insurance Athletic Complex; Caledonia Township, MI	L 7–24	2,102	
October 12	12:00 p.m.	at Michigan Tech	Sherman Field; Houghton, MI	W 24–20	1,231	
October 19	2:00 p.m.	Wayne State^{†}	Farmers Insurance Athletic Complex; Caledonia Township, MI	W 43–26	1,445	
October 26	2:00 p.m.	at Roosevelt	Morris Field; Arlington Heights, IL	W 19–14	692	
November 2	1:00 p.m.	at Saginaw Valley State	Harvey Randall Wickes Memorial Stadium; University Center, MI	L 14–24	4,339	
November 9	12:00 p.m.	Northern Michigan	Farmers Insurance Athletic Complex; Caledonia Township, MI	W 52–31	1,203	
November 16	1:00 p.m.	at No. 2 Ferris State	Top Taggart Field; Big Rapids, MI (Calder City Classic)	L 9–24	2,149	
*Non-conference game; ^{†}Homecoming; Rankings from AFCA Poll released prior to the game; All times are in Eastern time

== 2025 ==
2025 Davenport Panthers football
- Conference: Great Lakes Intercollegiate Athletic Conference
- Record: 5–5 (4–3 GLIAC)
- Head coach: Sparky McEwen (8th season)
- Home stadium: Farmers Insurance Athletic Complex

2025 Great Lakes Intercollegiate Athletic Conference football standings
	Conf.			Overall
Team	W		L	W		L
No. 1 Ferris State $^	7	–	0	16	–	0
Grand Valley State	5	–	2	7	–	3
Saginaw Valley State	5	–	2	6	–	5
Michigan Tech	4	–	3	7	–	4
Davenport	4	–	3	5	–	5
Northern Michigan	2	–	5	3	–	8
Roosevelt*	1	–	6	2	–	8
Wayne State (MI)	0	–	7	0	–	11
$ – Conference champion; ^ – NCAA Division II playoff participant; * – Roosevelt ineligible for postseason play due to transition from NAIA; Rankings from AFCA poll

The 2025 Davenport Panthers football team represent Davenport University as a member of the Great Lakes Intercollegiate Athletic Conference (GLIAC) during the 2025 NCAA Division II football season. Sparky McEwen leads the team in his eighth season as the Panthers' head coach.

=== Schedule ===
Date	Time	Opponent	Site	TV	Result	Attendance	Source
August 30	12:00 p.m.	at Gannon*	McConnell Family Stadium; Erie, PA		W 21–12	823	
September 13	1:00 p.m.	at Truman State*	Stokes Stadium; Kirksville, MO		L 27–28 ^{OT}	1,200	
September 20	1:00 p.m.	at Northern Michigan	Superior Dome; Marquette, MI	FloSports	W 35–16	2,680	
September 25	7:30 p.m.	Lincoln (CA)*	Farmers Insurance Athletic Complex; Caledonia Township, MI	FloSports	Cancelled	–	
October 4	4:00 p.m.	at No. 10 Grand Valley State	Lubbers Stadium; Allendale, MI	FloSports	L 14–37	15,188	
October 11	2:00 p.m.	Michigan Tech^{†}	Farmers Insurance Athletic Complex; Caledonia Township, MI	FloSports	L 14–16	1,837	
October 18	1:00 p.m.	at Wayne State (MI)	Tom Adams Field; Detroit, MI	FloSports	W 49–14	1,213	
October 25	12:00 p.m.	Roosevelt	Farmers Insurance Athletic Complex; Caledonia Township, MI	FloSports	W 75–23	1,249	
November 1	12:00 p.m.	Saginaw Valley State	Farmers Insurance Athletic Complex; Caledonia Township, MI	FloSports	W 31–17	966	
November 8	12:00 p.m.	Northern Michigan*	Farmers Insurance Athletic Complex; Caledonia Township, MI	FloSports	L 45–47 ^{4OT}	767	
November 15	12:00 p.m.	No. 1 Ferris State	Farmers Insurance Complex; Caledonia Township, MI (Calder City Classic)	FloSports	L 23–44	1,266	
*Non-conference game; ^{†}Homecoming; Rankings from AFCA Poll released prior to the game; All times are in Eastern time
