= Cornelius Bonner =

American football player (born 1976)

No. 8
- Position: Wide receiver

Personal information
- Born: September 1, 1976 (age 50)
- Listed height: 6 ft 0 in (1.83 m)
- Listed weight: 190 lb (86 kg)

Career information
- High school: Gaffney (Gaffney, South Carolina)
- College: Cincinnati

Career history
- Chicago Rush (2001–2003); Las Vegas Gladiators (2004–2005); Nashville Kats (2006–2007); Grand Rapids Rampage (2007); Cleveland Gladiators (2008)
- Stats at ArenaFan.com

Cornelius Bonner (born September 1, 1976) is an American former football wide receiver who played in the Arena Football League (AFL). The 6 feet tall and 190 pounds receiver played college football for the University of Cincinnati.

Bonner played on five teams in the AFL: Chicago Rush (2001–2003), Las Vegas Gladiators (2004–2005), Nashville Kats (2006, 2007), Grand Rapids Rampage (2007), and Cleveland Gladiators (2008). He wore jersey number 8 with the Gladiators.
