= Gaffney High School =

Public high school in Gaffney, South Carolina

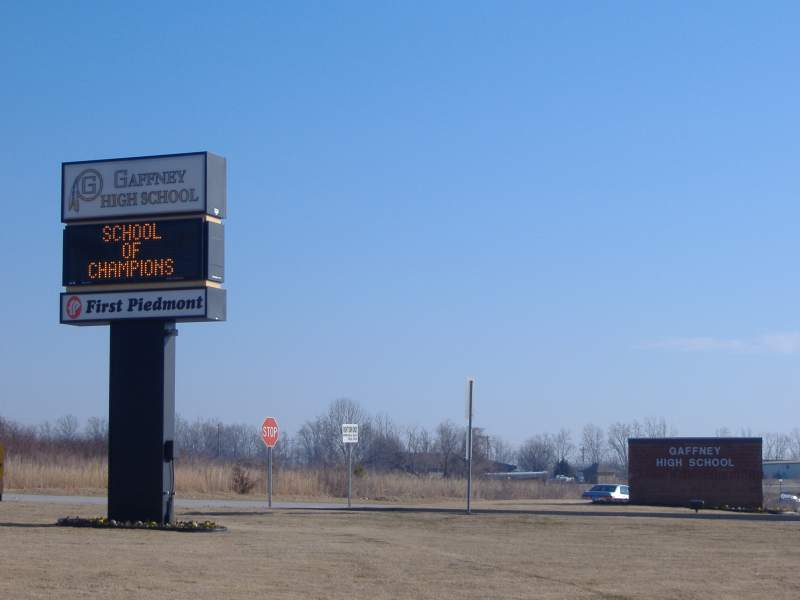
- Entrance in February 2006

Location
- 149 Twin Lake Road; Gaffney, South Carolina 29341; United States; 35°4′4″N 81°40′57″W

Information
- Other name: GHS
- Type: Public high school
- School district: Cherokee County School District
- NCES School ID: 450150000285
- Principal: Eric Blanton
- Teaching staff: 107.00 (on an FTE basis)
- Grades: 9–12
- Enrollment: 1,878 (2023–2024)
- Student to teacher ratio: 17.55
- Colors: Black and gold
- Mascot: Indian
- Nickname: Indians
- Newspaper: The Indian Post
- Yearbook: The Cherokeean
- Website: ghs.cherokee1.org

Gaffney High School (GHS) is a public high school in Gaffney, South Carolina in the United States. It is part of the Cherokee County School District.

== History ==
The high school building was opened at its 65-acre (260,000 m^{2}) campus for the 2000–01 school year for twenty-two million dollars. Faulty construction work led to the district suing the bonding company, architects, and construction company. The district received a ten-million-dollar settlement, with six million of it for replacing brickwork and four million for mediation and architectural fees.

In March 2007, the school board approved a plan to construct a "9th Grade Academy"; a separate building connected to the high school with a covered walkway. The new building will be used by freshman students, who numbered about 600 in the 2006–07 school year, for classes and meals. School officials said the new building should relieve overcrowding on the campus, opened in 2001 with a designed maximum capacity of 2,000 students but with a 2006–07 enrollment of about 2,100.

The school board also approved a new stadium for the school's Twin Lakes Road campus. The new stadium would replace the William K. Brumbach stadium, known locally as "the Reservation" and located at the former Gaffney High School site on East Frederick Street that is now home to Gaffney Middle School. On the home side of the current stadium, Gaffney's teams enter through a tunnel, described by the Spartanburg Herald-Journal as "a revered entrance for Gaffney teams."

The projected minimum cost of the stadium was $7.2 million, and another $1.5 million may be spent to build a new field track, more parking and a team meeting room, if school officials are able to get the money from contingency funds or if construction costs elsewhere come in under budget, according to a consultant for the school district.

== Athletics ==
Gaffney High School competes in the Class 5A Division of the South Carolina High School League.

=== State championships ===
- Football – 1927, 1928, 1929, 1931, 1934, 1960, 1961, 1963, 1964, 1965, 1985, 1992, 1997, 2003, 2005, 2006, 2012, 2021
- Baseball – 2009
- Basketball – 1949, 2003, 2004, 2005, 2010, 2012
- Softball – 2009
- Boys Golf – 2003, 2018
- Volleyball – 1982
- Boys Cross Country – 1976

== Notable alumni ==
- Charlie Blackwell-Thompson, NASA engineer and launch director
- Cornelius Bonner, Arena Football League (AFL) player
- Joe Craig, Canadian Football League (CFL) player
- Quinshad Davis, National Football League (NFL) player
- Charles Foster, Olympic hurdler
- Denzelle Good, NFL player
- Robert Hardy, NFL and CFL player
- Tyrion Ingram-Dawkins, college football player
- Jeff Littlejohn, AFL player
- Andie MacDowell, actress
- Michael McCluney, singer (Day 26)
- Ann Gordon McCrory, First Lady of North Carolina
- Rocky McIntosh, NFL player
- Tim Montgomery, Olympic sprinter
- L. J. Peak, National Basketball Association (NBA) G League player
- Arizona Reid (born 1986), Israeli National League basketball player
- Sidney Rice, NFL player
- Dominique Stevenson, NFL player
