= Denzelle Good =

American football player (born 1991)

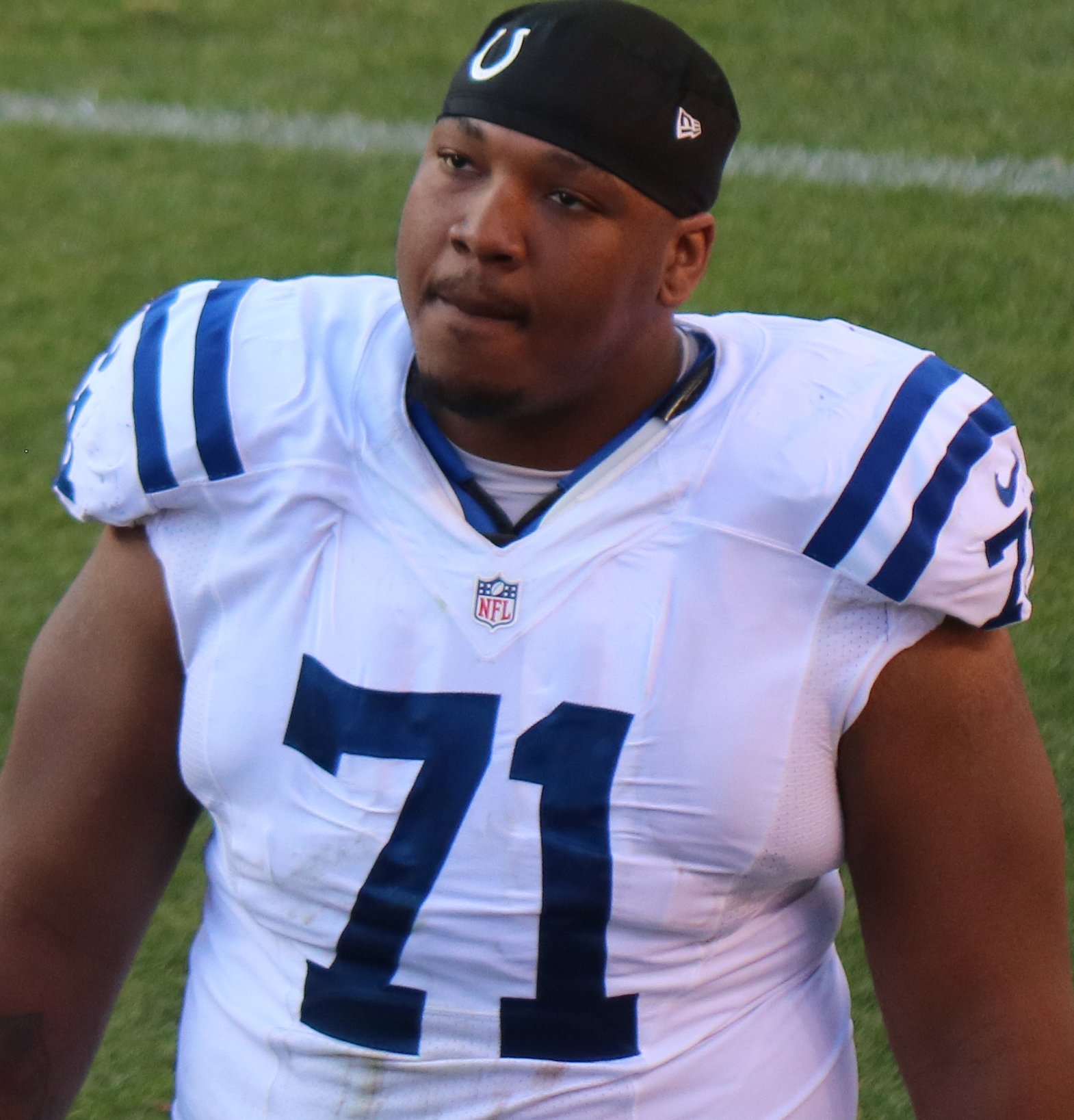
- Good with the Indianapolis Colts in 2016

No. 71, 69
- Position: Offensive guard

Personal information
- Born: March 8, 1991 (age 35); Gaffney, South Carolina, U.S.
- Listed height: 6 ft 5 in (1.96 m)
- Listed weight: 340 lb (154 kg)

Career information
- High school: Gaffney
- College: NC State (2009–2010); Mars Hill (2012–2014)
- NFL draft: 2015: 7th round, 255th overall pick

Career history
- Indianapolis Colts (2015–2018); Oakland / Las Vegas Raiders (2018–2021)

Career NFL statistics
- Games played: 62
- Games started: 43
- Stats at Pro Football Reference

Denzelle Good (born March 8, 1991) is an American former professional football player who was an offensive guard in the National Football League (NFL). He played college football for the NC State Wolfpack and later the Mars Hill Lions, and was selected by the Indianapolis Colts in the seventh round of the 2015 NFL draft.

== College career ==
Good initially went to North Carolina State on a football scholarship, but was released from his scholarship as a redshirt freshman in 2010. He then attended Mars Hill University from 2012 to 2014.

== Professional career ==
=== Indianapolis Colts ===
Good was selected by the Indianapolis Colts in the seventh round (255th overall) of the 2015 NFL draft. He was just the third player from Mars Hill University to ever be drafted, and the first since 2003. He agreed to terms with the Colts on May 6, 2015.

Good was inactive for the first 11 weeks of the season, before making his NFL debut against the Tampa Bay Buccaneers. He played in 6 games in 2015, 4 of which he started.

Good entered the 2017 season as the Colts starting right tackle. On September 13, 2017, Good was placed on injured reserve. He was activated off injured reserve to the active roster on November 9, 2017.

In 2018, Good played in two games, starting one at right tackle, before being waived on December 1, 2018. Over his tenure with the team he appeared in 26 games, starting 20.

=== Oakland / Las Vegas Raiders ===
On December 3, 2018, Good was claimed off waivers by the Oakland Raiders. He started the final three games of the season at right guard in place of an injured Gabe Jackson.

Good signed a one-year contract extension with the Raiders on March 2, 2019. He started five games at both guard spots in 2019 due to injuries.

On January 9, 2020, Good signed a one-year contract extension with the Raiders. He was placed on the reserve/COVID-19 list by the team on October 22, 2020, and was activated two days later.

Good re-signed with the Raiders on March 24, 2021, on a two-year contract. He suffered a torn ACL in Week 1 and was placed on season-ending injured reserve on September 14, 2021.

On July 25, 2022, Good was placed on the reserve/retired list.

== Personal life ==
Good was born on March 8, 1991, in Gaffney, South Carolina. He attended Gaffney High School, where he played football.

On October 2, 2018, Good's younger brother, Overton, was killed in a drive-by shooting in Cherokee County, South Carolina.
