= Ronney Daniels =

American football player (born 1976)

Profile
- Position: Wide receiver

Personal information
- Born: September 17, 1976 (age 50); Lake Wales, Florida, U.S.

Career information
- College: Auburn

Career history
- New England Patriots (2001)*; Miami Dolphins (2001–2002)*; Tampa Bay Storm (2005–2006); Grand Rapids Rampage (2007)
- * Offseason or practice squad member only

Awards and highlights
- Second-team All-SEC (1999); SEC Freshman of the Year (1999)

Career AFL statistics
- Receptions: 76
- Receiving yards: 861
- Touchdowns: 9

Ronney Jerone Daniels (born September 17, 1976) is an American former professional football player who was a wide receiver in the Arena Football League (AFL) for the Tampa Bay Storm and the Grand Rapids Rampage. He played college football for the Auburn Tigers, where he holds the school record for receiving yards in a season with 1,068.

Prior to his college career, he played Minor League Baseball in the Montreal Expos organization.
