= Timon Marshall =

American football player and coach

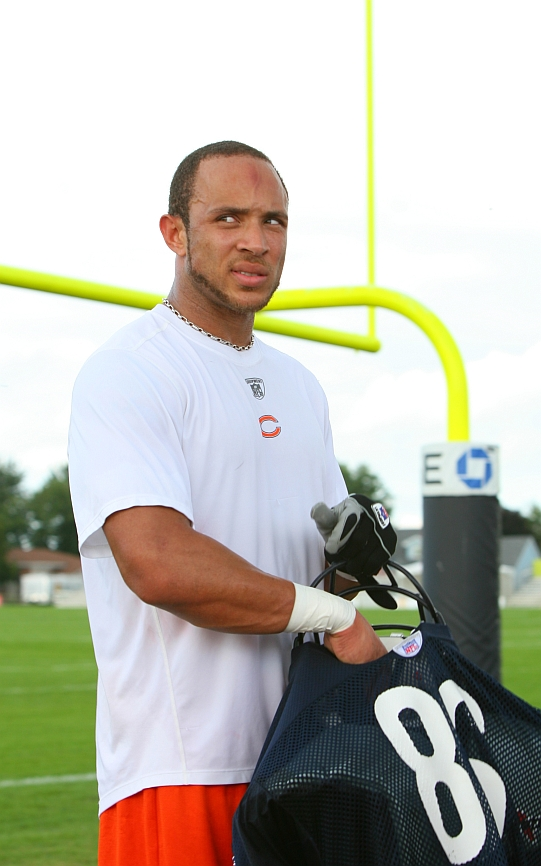
- Marshall at the Chicago Bears 2007 training camp

No. 4, 5
- Position: Wide receiver

Personal information
- Born: August 7, 1979 (age 47)
- Listed height: 5 ft 11 in (1.80 m)
- Listed weight: 183 lb (83 kg)

Career information
- College: Ottawa (Kansas)
- NFL draft: 2001: undrafted

Career history

Playing
- Tulsa Talons (2003); Oklahoma City Yard Dawgz (2004); Grand Rapids Rampage (2005–2007); Chicago Bears (2007)*; Los Angeles Avengers (2008); Kansas City Chiefs (2008)*; Oklahoma City Yard Dawgz (2010); Corpus Christi Fury (2013, 2015–2016)
- * Offseason or practice squad member only

Coaching
- Corpus Christi Hammerheads (OC) (2009); Houston Stallions (OC) (2011–2012)

Awards and highlights
- AFL All-Ironman Team (2006)

Career AFL statistics
- Receptions: 412
- Receiving TDs: 89
- Receiving yards: 5,115
- Rushing TDs: 5
- Kickoff return yards - TDs: 6,897 - 12
- Stats at ArenaFan.com

Timon Marshall (born August 7, 1979) is an American former professional football wide receiver.

== Football career ==
Marshall played college football at Ottawa University, and eventually played for the Grand Rapids Rampage in the Arena Football League (AFL).

Marshall caught 102 receptions for 1,134 yards and 27 touchdowns, while leading the AFL with 1,901 yards and six touchdowns as a kick returner. His efforts attracted the attention of the Chicago Bears of the National Football League, who welcomed him to one of their practice sessions on June 6, 2007. He competed for a spot as a starting wide receiver against Rashied Davis, who coincidentally played in the Arena League before signing with the Bears. Marshall was released by the Bears on August 27, 2007. He signed with the Kansas City Chiefs on July 23, 2008 but was released five days later.

In 2013, Marshall signed with the Corpus Christi Fury of the Ultimate Indoor Football League.
