= Sparky McEwen =

American football player and coach (born 1968)

Davenport Panthers
- Title: Head coach

Personal information
- Born: April 28, 1968 (age 58)
- Listed height: 6 ft 2 in (1.88 m)
- Listed weight: 215 lb (98 kg)

Career information
- Position: Quarterback
- High school: Creston (Grand Rapids, Michigan)
- College: Ferris State (1987–1990)
- NFL draft: 1991: undrafted

Career history

Playing
- Grand Rapids Rampage (1998)

Coaching
- Creston HS (MI) (1999–2003) Head coach; Grand Rapids Rampage (2000) Assistant coach; Grand Rapids Rampage (2001–2003) Offensive coordinator; Oklahoma City Yard Dawgz (2004) Assistant head coach and offensive coordinator; Grand Rapids Rampage (2005–2007) Head coach; Oklahoma City Yard Dawgz (2008–2010) Head coach; Ferris State (2012–2016) Wide receivers coach; Davenport (2017–present) Head coach

Awards and highlights
- ArenaBowl champion (2001)

Career AFL statistics
- Comp. / Att.: 34 / 62
- Passing yards: 477
- TD–INT: 4–4
- Passer rating: 69.09
- Rushing TDs: 6
- Stats at ArenaFan.com

Head coaching record
- Regular season: 76–101 (.429)
- Postseason: 0–2 (.000)
- Career: 76–103 (.425)

Charles "Sparky" McEwen (born April 28, 1968) is an American football coach and former player. He is the head football coach for Davenport University, a position he has held since 2017. McEwen played professionally as a quarterback for one season with the Grand Rapids Rampage of the Arena Football League (AFL). He played college football at Ferris State University. He was also head coach of the Rampage and Oklahoma City Yard Dawgz.

== Early life ==
McEwen attended Creston High School in Grand Rapids, Michigan.

== College career ==
McEwen played for the Ferris State Bulldogs from 1987 to 1990. He was redshirted in 1987. He played quarterback for the Bulldogs from 1988 to 1989. McEwen recorded 2,183 career yards and 17 touchdowns on 155 of 297 pass attempts. He converted to wide receiver in 1990, recording 18 receptions for 259 yards and one touchdown.

== Professional career ==
McEwen played for the Grand Rapids Rampage of the AFL in 1998, appearing in five games and recording four touchdowns on 477 passing yards. He had a 2–1 record as a starting quarterback.

== Coaching career ==
McEwen was head coach of the Creston High School Polar Bears of Grand Rapids, Michigan from 1996 to 2003. The Polar Bears won three City League titles from 2000 to 2002. In 1999, he helped the Polar Bears to the team’s first winning season since 1978 as well as the school’s first appearance in the state championship game.

McEwen first served as an offensive assistant and scout for the Grand Rapids Rampage in 2000. McEwen was later offensive coordinator for the Rampage from 2001 to 2003. He was assistant head coach and offensive coordinator for the Oklahoma City Yard Dawgz of the af2 in 2004. He was head coach and director of football operations for the Grand Rapids Rampage from 2005 to 2007. The Rampage attained a record of 13–35 during his tenure. McEwen was head coach of the Oklahoma City Yard Dawgz from 2008 to 2010. The Yard Dawgz were promoted to the AFL in 2010 and finished the season with a 6–10 record.

McEwen became wide receivers coach of the Ferris State Bulldogs in 2012. In February 2017, he was named the head coach of the Davenport Panthers of Davenport University.

== Head coaching record ==
=== AFL ===
Team	Year	Regular season				Postseason			
Team	Year	Won	Lost	Win %	Finish	Won	Lost	Win %	Result
GRR	2005	4	12	.250	4th in Central	0	0	.000	–
GRR	2006	5	11	.313	4th in Central	0	0	.000	–
GRR	2007	4	12	.250	5th in Central	0	0	.000	–
GRR total		13	35	.271	–	0	0	–	
OKC	2010	6	10	.375	2nd in Southwest	0	0	.000	–
Total		19	45	.297		0	0	.000	

=== af2 ===
Team	Year	Regular season				Postseason			
Team	Year	Won	Lost	Win %	Finish	Won	Lost	Win %	Result
OKC	2008	5	5	.500	4th in Central	0	0	.000	–
OKC	2009	7	9	.438	2nd in Central	0	1	.000	Lost to Tulsa Talons in first round
Total		12	14	.500		0	1	.000	

Note: McEwen took over after six games after Gary Reasons resigned, the Yard Dawgz finished 6–10 overall.

=== College ===
Year	Team	Overall	Conference	Standing	Bowl/playoffs	AFCA^{#}
Davenport Panthers (Great Lakes Intercollegiate Athletic Conference) (2017–present)
2017	Davenport	1–10	0–9	10th		
2018	Davenport	6–5	3–5	T–5th		
2019	Davenport	5–5	3–5	T–5th		
2020–21	Davenport	2–0				
2021	Davenport	3–8	2–5	T–5th		
2022	Davenport	8–3	4–2	3rd	L NCAA Division II First Round	20
2023	Davenport	8–2	4–2	3rd		
2024	Davenport	7–4	4–3	T–3rd		
2025	Davenport	5–5	4–3	T–4th		
Davenport:		46–42	24–34			
Total:		46–42				
