= Robert Hardy (running back) =

American football running back

No. 36, 32
- Position: Running back

Personal information
- Born: September 1, 1967 (age 59); Gaffney, South Carolina, U.S.

Career information
- High school: Gaffney
- College: Lees-McRae JC (1987–1988); Carson–Newman (1989–1990)

Career history
- Tampa Bay Buccaneers (1991–1992); Edmonton Eskimos (1992); Sacramento Gold Miners (1993)

Robert Kenneth Hardy (born September 1, 1967) is an American professional football running back. He played for the Tampa Bay Buccaneers of the National Football League (NFL), and played for the Edmonton Elks and the Sacramento Gold Miners of the Canadian Football League (CFL).
