= 2009 Oklahoma City Yard Dawgz season =

American football season

- Owner: Phil Miller
- General manager: Christie Cook
- Head coach: Sparky McEwen
- Home stadium: Cox Convention Center

Results
- Record: 7–9
- Division place: 2nd NC Central
- Playoffs: Lost First Round (Talons) 75–90

The 2009 Oklahoma City Yard Dawgz season was the sixth season for the franchise in the af2. The team was coached by Sparky McEwen and played their home games at the Cox Convention Center. The Yard Dawgz finished the regular season 7–9 and made the playoffs for the fifth time in franchise history.

== Standings ==
National Conference Central Division
Team	Overall			Division		
Team	Wins	Losses	Percentage	Wins	Losses	Percentage
Tulsa Talons	13	3	.812	4	0	1.000
Oklahoma City Yard Dawgz	7	9	.438	2	2	.500
Amarillo Dusters	3	13	.188	0	4	.000

== Schedule ==
=== Regular season ===
Week	Day	Date	Kickoff	Opponent	Results		Location	Attendance	Report
Week	Day	Date	Kickoff	Opponent	Score	Record	Location	Attendance	Report
1	Sunday	March 29		at Amarillo Dusters	W 76–29	1–0	Amarillo Civic Center	2,037	
2	Saturday	April 4		South Georgia Wildcats	W 66–58	2–0	Cox Convention Center	4,952	
3	Saturday	April 11		Central Valley Coyotes	W 76–38	3–0	Cox Convention Center	6,360	
4	Bye								
5	Saturday	April 25		Amarillo Dusters	W 41–28	4–0	Cox Convention Center	5,336	
6	Friday	May 1		Rio Grande Valley Dorados	L 73–74	4–1	Cox Convention Center	6,357	
7	Saturday	May 9		at Tulsa Talons	L 56–75	4–2	Tulsa Convention Center	6,371	
8	Saturday	May 16		at Tennessee Valley Vipers	L 24–49	4–3	Von Braun Center	3,564	
9	Monday	May 25		at Corpus Christi Sharks	L 62–65	4–4	American Bank Center	3,645	
10	Saturday	May 30		Tulsa Talons	L 46–73	4–5	Cox Convention Center	5,952	
11	Saturday	June 6		at Arkansas Twisters	W 56–54	5–5	Verizon Arena	4,263	
12	Saturday	June 13		Milwaukee Iron	W 63–28	6–5	Cox Convention Center	5,576	
13	Saturday	June 20		Corpus Christi Sharks	W 93–41	7–5	Cox Convention Center	5,514	
14	Friday	June 26		at Spokane Shock	L 28–61	7–6	Spokane Veterans Memorial Arena	10,026	
15	Friday	July 3		at Rio Grande Valley Dorados	L 43–46	7–7	Dodge Arena	4,062	
16	Saturday	July 11		Bossier-Shreveport Battle Wings	L 67–69	7–8	Cox Convention Center	7,564	
7	Bye								
18	Saturday	July 25		at Iowa Barnstormers	L 59–63	7–9	Wells Fargo Arena	10,516	

=== Playoffs ===
Round	Day	Date	Kickoff	Opponent	Results	Location	Attendance	Report
1	Saturday	August 1		at Tulsa Talons	L 75-90	Tulsa Convention Center	4,500	

== Roster ==
2009 Oklahoma City Yard Dawgz roster
Quarterbacks: 15 Tommy Grady; Fullbacks: 23 Freddie Rollins; Wide receivers: 17 Matt Fields; 7 Craig Fulton, Jr.; 12 Al Hunt; 10 Agim Shabaj	Offensive linemen: 75 Jeremy Ashcraft; 77 Kelly Butler; 58 Markus Ferguson; Defensive linemen: 5 Aaron Chavers; 91 Steven Coleman; 99 Mondre Dickerson; 2 Chris Maddox	Linebackers: 4 Anthony Kelly; 44 Bryce Reed; Defensive backs: 25 Donita Bright; 21 Tito Jose; 6 Travis Seaton; 8 Fred Shaw; Kickers: Currently vacant	Injured reserve: Currently vacant; Suspended list: Currently vacant; Rookies in italics Roster updated July 25, 2009; 19 Active, 00 Inactive → More rosters
