= Tyrion Ingram-Dawkins =

American football player (born 2003)

No. 90 – Minnesota Vikings
- Position: Defensive end
- Roster status: Active

Personal information
- Born: June 26, 2003 (age 23)
- Listed height: 6 ft 5 in (1.96 m)
- Listed weight: 290 lb (132 kg)

Career information
- High school: Gaffney (SC)
- College: Georgia (2021–2024)
- NFL draft: 2025: 5th round, 139th overall pick

Career history
- Minnesota Vikings (2025–present)

Awards and highlights
- 2× CFP national champion (2021, 2022)

Career NFL statistics as of Week 10, 2026
- Tackles: 27
- Sacks: 2.0
- Pass deflections: 3
- Stats at Pro Football Reference

Tyrion Lamar Ingram-Dawkins (born June 26, 2003) is an American professional football defensive end for the Minnesota Vikings of the National Football League (NFL). He played college football for the Georgia Bulldogs and was selected by the Vikings in the fifth round of the 2025 NFL draft.

== Early life ==
Ingram-Dawkins attended Gaffney High School in Gaffney, South Carolina. As a senior, he recorded 31 tackles and seven sacks, being named the 2020 South Carolina Mr. Football. He was selected to play in the 2021 All-American Bowl. A four-star recruit and the top ranked recruit from South Carolina, Ingram-Dawkins committed to play college football at the University of Georgia.

== College career ==
After redshirting in 2021, Ingram-Dawkins played in 14 games and totaled ten tackles in 2022. During the 2023 season, he underwent foot surgery, limiting his playing time. The following season, Ingram-Dawkins playing time increased, being named the co-SEC defensive lineman of the week after recording three tackles, including two tackles for loss, and a sack against Kentucky.

== Professional career ==
Pre-draft measurables
Height	Weight	Arm length	Hand span	Wingspan	40-yard dash	10-yard split	20-yard split	20-yard shuttle	Three-cone drill	Vertical jump	Broad jump	Bench press
6 ft 4 3/4 in (1.95 m)	276 lb (125 kg)	33 1/2 in (0.85 m)	9 3/4 in (0.25 m)	6 ft 10 3/4 in (2.10 m)	4.86 s	1.69 s	2.78 s	4.34 s	7.28 s	36.0 in (0.91 m)	10 ft 4 in (3.15 m)	23 reps
All values from NFL Combine/Pro Day

Ingram-Dawkins was selected by the Minnesota Vikings with the 139th pick in the fifth round of the 2025 NFL draft.

== NFL career statistics ==
=== Regular season ===
Year	Team	Games		Tackles					Interceptions						Fumbles				
Year	Team	GP	GS	Cmb	Solo	Ast	Sck	TFL	Int	Yds	Avg	Lng	TD	PD	FF	Fum	FR	Yds	TD
2025	MIN	14	1	12	6	6	1.0	2	0	0	0.0	0	0	1	0	0	0	0	0
Career		14	1	12	6	6	1.0	2	0	0	0.0	0	0	1	0	0	0	0	0
