= Dominique Stevenson =

American football player (born 1977)

No. 50, 51
- Position: Linebacker

Personal information
- Born: December 28, 1977 (age 48); Gaffney, South Carolina, U.S.

Career information
- High school: Gaffney
- College: Tennessee
- NFL draft: 2002: 7th round, 260th overall pick

Career history
- 2002–2003: Buffalo Bills
- 2004: Washington Redskins

Awards and highlights
- BCS national champion (1998)

Career NFL statistics
- Total tackles: 23
- Stats at Pro Football Reference

Antone Dominique Stevenson (born December 28, 1977) is an American former professional football player who was a linebacker in the National Football League (NFL) for the Buffalo Bills and Washington Redskins. He played college football for the Tennessee Volunteers and was selected by the Bills in the seventh round of the 2002 NFL draft.

== Early life ==
Stevenson attended and played high school football at Gaffney High School.

== College career ==
Stevenson attended and played college football at the University of Tennessee. In the 2000 season, he appeared in 11 games. In the Florida game, he recorded an interception. In the 2001 season, he appeared in 11 games. In the victory over Notre Dame, he recorded an interception.

== Professional career ==
Stevenson was selected by the Buffalo Bills with the 260th overall pick in the seventh round of the 2002 NFL draft.

Stevenson was a linebacker for the Buffalo Bills from 2002 to 2003 and for the Washington Redskins in 2004. In the 2002 season, he appeared in four games. In the 2003 season, he appeared in all 16 games. In the 2004 season, his last in the NFL, he appeared in one game.

== Coaching career ==
He had an internship as Linebacker Coach in 2008 at Southern Methodist University. He then moved to Louisiana State University first as Assistant to Linebacker Coach in 2009 and then as Assistant to Secondary Coach in 2010. He then moved to Alabama State University as Safeties Coach 2011–2012, and then as Alabama State University Linebacker and Assistant Special Team Coach 2013–2014. He was selected and attended the 2013 NFL Coaches Academy and became NFL Liaison.
