= Winfield Garnett =

American football player (born 1976)

No. 95, 92
- Position: Defensive tackle

Personal information
- Born: July 24, 1976 (age 50); Chicago, Illinois, U.S.
- Listed height: 6 ft 6 in (1.98 m)
- Listed weight: 320 lb (145 kg)

Career information
- High school: Thornton Township (Harvey, Illinois)
- College: Ohio State
- NFL draft: 1998: undrafted

Career history

Playing
- Jacksonville Jaguars (1998)*; Seattle Seahawks (1999)*; Barcelona Dragons (1999); New Orleans Saints (2000)*; Florida Bobcats (2001)*; Minnesota Vikings (2001–2002); → Amsterdam Admirals (2001); Philadelphia Soul (2004–2005); Grand Rapids Rampage (2006–2007); Dallas Desperados (2008)
- * Offseason or practice squad member only

Coaching
- Ohio Dominican (2010–2015) Defensive line

Awards and highlights
- All-NFL Europe (2001); AFL All-Ironman Team (2007)

Career NFL statistics
- Total tackles: 19
- Sacks: 2
- Passes defended: 1
- Stats at Pro Football Reference

Career AFL statistics
- Tackles: 49
- Sacks: 14
- Forced fumbles: 5
- Stats at ArenaFan.com

Winfield Alexander Garnett (born July 24, 1976) is an American former professional football player who was a defensive tackle in the National Football League (NFL). He played college football for the Ohio State Buckeyes. He also played professionally in NFL Europe and the Arena Football League.

From 2010 to 2015, Garnett was the defensive line coach at Ohio Dominican University.
