= Clarence Coleman (gridiron football) =

American gridiron football player (born 1980)

No. 85
- Position: Wide receiver

Personal information
- Born: June 4, 1980 (age 46); Miami, Florida, U.S.
- Listed height: 5 ft 9 in (1.75 m)
- Listed weight: 190 lb (86 kg)

Career information
- College: Ferris State
- NFL draft: 2002: undrafted

Career history
- Buffalo Bills (2002–2004); Grand Rapids Rampage (2007); BC Lions (2008–2009)
- Stats at Pro Football Reference
- Stats at CFL.ca (archive)
- Stats at ArenaFan.com

Clarence Coleman (born June 4, 1980) is an American former professional football wide receiver. He was signed as an undrafted free agent by the Buffalo Bills in 2003. He played college football at Ferris State University.
