= Mike Pucillo =

American football player (born 1979)

No. 61, 62
- Position: Guard

Personal information
- Born: July 14, 1979 (age 47); Cleveland, Ohio, U.S.
- Listed height: 6 ft 4 in (1.93 m)
- Listed weight: 306 lb (139 kg)

Career information
- College: Auburn
- NFL draft: 2002: 7th round, 215th overall pick

Career history
- Buffalo Bills (2002–2004); Cleveland Browns (2005); Washington Redskins (2006–2007)

Career NFL statistics
- Games played: 48
- Games started: 19
- Fumble recoveries: 1
- Stats at Pro Football Reference

Michael Pucillo (/puːˈsɪloʊ/; born July 14, 1979) is an American former professional football player who played offensive guard in the National Football League (NFL). He played college football at Auburn.

== College career ==
Pucillo attended Auburn University and was a letterman in football. In football, he played offensive guard and center, started 25 games, and as a junior, he helped the team average 356.7 total yards per game.

== Professional career ==
Pucillo was drafted 215th overall in the seventh round of the 2002 NFL Draft.

On February 27, 2007, Pucillo re-signed with the Redskins in a 1-year contract worth $540,000 (veteran minimum).

Due to an injury to Todd Wade, Pucillo got his first start at left guard during the preseason against the Pittsburgh Steelers. Head Coach Joe Gibbs said, "With Todd being hurt, we gave him a chance to start and I thought he did very well. He continues to be a valuable guy because he can do so many things for you. He can play tight end for you in our [short yardage] package. He can back up Casey at center and now he has a chance to start at guard. So we have to continue to play that out. There's an example of someone seizing an opportunity and he gave it everything he's got. He has been impressive." However, the Redskins did not resign Pucillo after the 2007 season so he became a free agent.
