= Lou Esposito =

American football player and coach

Baltimore Ravens
- Title: Defensive line coach

Personal information
- Born: September 13, 1977 (age 49)

Career information
- Position: Guard
- High school: Manalapan High School (Manalapan Township, New Jersey)
- College: Memphis (1997–2000)

Career history

Playing
- Memphis Xplorers (2001–2002)

Coaching
- Memphis Xplorers (2003) Offensive line coach & special teams coordinator; Saint Joseph's (IN) (2004) Defensive coordinator; Saint Joseph's (IN) (2005–2009) Head coach; Western Michigan (2010–2012) Defensive line coach; Ferris State (2013) Defensive coordinator; Davenport (2014–2016) Head coach; Western Michigan (2017–2023) Defensive coordinator & defensive line coach; Michigan (2024–2025) Defensive line coach; Baltimore Ravens (2026–present) Defensive line coach

Head coaching record
- Career: Collegiate: 35–30

Louis Esposito III (born September 13, 1977) is an American football coach and former player who is the defensive line coach for the Baltimore Ravens of the National Football League (NFL). He previously was the defensive line coach at the University of Michigan. Prior to Michigan, Esposito was the defensive coordinator at Western Michigan University and a head coach at Saint Joseph's College and Davenport University.

== Playing career ==
Esposito graduated in 1995 from Manalapan High School in Manalapan Township, New Jersey, where he played football and wrestled. He played college football at the University of Memphis, where he was a four-year letterman from 1997 to 2000.

Following his time at Memphis, Esposito played two seasons with the Memphis Xplorers, a professional arena football team in the AF2 league. His roommate during those years was Tim Lester, who had played quarterback at Western Michigan.

== Coaching career ==
Esposito began his coaching career with the Xplorers in 2003. He left in 2004 to become defensive coordinator at Saint Joseph's College in Rensselaer, Indiana, where Tim Lester had just been hired as the head coach. When Lester left after one season to become quarterbacks coach at Western Michigan under new head coach Bill Cubit, Esposito succeeded Lester as head coach at Saint Joseph's.

Esposito coached at Saint Joseph's for five seasons, from 2005–2009. During his tenure, Saint Joseph's became a member of the Great Lakes Football Conference and won the conference twice. Esposito's overall record at Saint Joseph's was 29–25. Following the conclusion of the 2009 season, Esposito resigned to become the defensive line coach at Western Michigan under Cubit. A. J. Ricker, the offensive line coach, succeeded him at Saint Joseph's.

Esposito left Western Michigan after the 2012 season, heading 90 minutes north on U.S. Route 131 to become the defensive coordinator at Ferris State in Big Rapids, Michigan. He stayed at Ferris State for one year before accepting the head coaching job at Davenport University in Grand Rapids, Michigan.

Esposito was Davenport's first head coach and oversaw the recruiting of its initial class, a practice season in 2015, and the program's first full season in 2016, in which he compiled a record of 6–5. After that initial season, Esposito resigned to return to Western Michigan, this time as defensive coordinator under Tim Lester, who had just been hired as the WMU head coach, replacing P. J. Fleck.

Esposito was the defensive coordinator at Western Michigan from 2017 to 2023, and was regarded as one of the top coordinators in the MAC. After the 2023 season, Esposito left Western Michigan to become the co-defensive coordinator and defensive line coach at Memphis in early 2024. A month after his initial hiring, Esposito left Memphis before the season started.

On March 29, 2024, it was announced that Esposito was hired as the defensive line coach for the defending national champion, Michigan Wolverines.

On February 5, 2026, it was announced that Esposito was hired as the defensive line coach for the Baltimore Ravens under new head coach, Jesse Minter.

== Head coaching record ==
| Year | Team | Overall | Conference | Standing | Bowl/playoffs |
|---|---|---|---|---|---|
Saint Joseph's Pumas (NCAA Division II independent) (2005)
| 2005 | Saint Joseph's | 7–4 | | | |
Saint Joseph's Pumas (Great Lakes Football Conference) (2006–2009)
| 2006 | Saint Joseph's | 8–3 | 4–1 | T–1st | |
| 2007 | Saint Joseph's | 4–7 | 3–2 | T–2nd | |
| 2008 | Saint Joseph's | 5–5 | 2–2 | 4th | |
| 2009 | Saint Joseph's | 5–6 | 4–0 | 1st | |
| Saint Joseph's: | | 29–25 | 13–5 | | |
Davenport Panthers (NAIA independent) (2016)
| 2016 | Davenport | 6–5 | | | |
| Davenport: | | 6–5 | | | |
| Total: | | 35–30 | | | |
National championship Conference title Conference division title or championship game berth
