= Oklahoma City Yard Dawgz =

Arena football team

Logo

General information
- Founded: 2004
- Folded: 2010
- Headquartered: Cox Convention Center in Oklahoma City, Oklahoma
- Colors: Black, brick, silver, white

Personnel
- Owner: Phil Miller
- Head coach: Sparky McEwen

Team history
- Oklahoma City Yard Dawgz (2004–2010)

Home fields
- Ford Center (2004–2008); Cox Convention Center (2009–2010)

League / conference affiliations
- AF2 (2004–2009): National Conference (2004–2009); Southwest Division (2004); Midwest Division (2005–2006); Central Division (2007–2009); Arena Football League (2010): American Conference (2010); Southwest Division (2010)

Playoff appearances (5)
- af2: 2004, 2005, 2006, 2007, 2009

The Oklahoma City Yard Dawgz were an arena football team. The team began play as a 2004 expansion team of the Arena Football League's minor league af2 before becoming a member of the AFL in 2010. Formerly a tenant of the Ford Center from 2004 until 2008, the Yard Dawgz were forced out when the National Basketball Association's Oklahoma City Thunder moved into town; starting in 2009, the Yard Dawgz played across the street at the Cox Convention Center. On October 25, 2010 Yard Dawgz owner Phil Miller announced that he decided not to play in the Arena Football League for the 2011 season.

== Team history ==
=== Three straight winning seasons ===
The Yard Dawgz had a successful first year on and off the field by leading the league in attendance and finishing the regular season with 10–6 record to finish second in the Southwest Division of the National Conference.

In 2005, The Yard Dawgz had another successful year, despite changing divisions, by coming in third in attendance and finishing the regular season with 10–6 record to finish second in the Midwest Division of the National Conference. The Dawgz lost in the first round to the Amarillo Dusters.

The Yard Dawgz had their best showing in 2006 with a record of 11–5 and their third playoff appearance. Kicker A.J. Haglund won the af2 Kicker of the Year award and Quarterback Craig Strickland became the only player in af2 history to reach 20,000 career passing yards.

=== First losing season ===
In 2007, under head coach John Fitzgerald, the Yard Dawgz had the second leading offense in the league, averaging 310.9 yd/game. Despite finishing 7-9, the team made its fourth consecutive playoff appearance. Three members of the 2007 Yard Dawgz earned All-af2 First Team honors – WR/DB Al Hunt, Center Gene Frederic, and OL/DL Barry Giles.

=== 2008 season ===
The Yard Dawgs brought back Gary Reasons to coach in 2008, but after the team got off to a 1–5 start, Reasons stepped down as head coach. Sparky McEwen took over as interim head coach. On June 28, 2008, against the Lubbock Renegades, Wide Receiver Al Hunt became only the third player in af2 history to record 1,000 points.

=== 2009 season ===
After starting the season with a 4–0 record, a team–record four straight opening wins, the Yard Dawgz then dropped five games in a row, the longest losing streak in team history, to drop to 4–5. The Dawgz bounced back to win three in a row to push their record to 7–5, and kept their playoff hopes alive.

On June 20, the Yard Dawgz faced off against the Corpus Christi Sharks. The Yard Dawgz beat the Sharks 93–41 and set an af2 record for points scored in a first half (59) and beat their own franchise record for points scored in a game, which had previously been set against the Tulsa Talons.

Despite a loss against the Spokane Shock on June 26, the Yard Dawgz clinched a playoff berth when Boise beat Central Valley the next night. The playoff appearance marked the fifth time in six years that the Dawgz were in post-season play.

The Yard Dawgz season ended on August 1 at the hands of the Tulsa Talons in the first round of ArenaCup playoffs. With the loss, the Dawgz had dropped five straight postseason games and were winless in the team's history in the playoffs.

=== 2011 season ===
On October 25, 2010, Yard Dawgz owner Phil Miller announced that he decided not to play in the Arena Football League for the 2011 season. However, the Indoor Football League announced the same day that a new team would play in Oklahoma City in 2011.

== Season-by-season ==
ArenaBowl champions	ArenaBowl appearance	Division champions	Playoff berth

Season	Team	League	Conference	Division	Regular season			Postseason results
Season	Team	League	Conference	Division	Finish	Wins	Losses	Postseason results
Oklahoma City Yard Dawgz
2004	2004	AF2	National	Southwest	2nd	10	6	Lost Week 1 (Peoria) 45–36
2005	2005	af2	National	Midwest	2nd	10	6	Lost Week 1 (Amarillo) 59–56
2006	2006	af2	National	Midwest	2nd	11	5	Lost Week 1 (Arkansas) 47–43
2007	2007	af2	National	Central	3rd	7	9	Lost Week 1 (Tulsa) 62–27
2008	2008	af2	National	Central	3rd	6	10	
2009	2009	af2	National	Central	2nd	7	9	Lost Week 1 (Tulsa) 90–75
2010	2010	AFL	American	Southwest	2nd	6	10	
Total						57	55	(includes only regular season)
Total						0	5	(includes only the postseason)
Total						57	60	(includes both regular season and postseason)

== Notable players ==
See Category:Oklahoma City Yard Dawgz players

== Head coaches ==
Name	Term	Regular season				Playoffs		Awards
Name	Term	W	L	T	Win%	W	L	Awards
Gary Reasons	2004, 2008	11	11	0	.500	0	1	
Jeff Jarnigan	2005–2006	21	11	0	.656	0	2	
John Fitzgerald	2007	7	9	0	.438	0	1	
Sparky McEwen	2008–2010	18	24	0	.429	0	1	
