= Grand Rapids Rampage =

Arena football team

- Logo
- Uniforms

General information
- Founded: 1998
- Folded: 2009
- Headquartered: Van Andel Arena in Grand Rapids, Michigan
- Colors: Red, black, silver, white
- Mascot: Blitz

Personnel
- Owner: Dan DeVos
- Head coach: Steve Thonn

Team history
- Grand Rapids Rampage (1998–2009)

Home fields
- Van Andel Arena (1998–2009)

League / conference affiliations
- Arena Football League (1998–2009): American Conference (1998–2009); Central (1998–2009)

Championships
- League championships: 1: 2001
- Division championships: 1: Central: 2001

Playoff appearances (6)
- 1999, 2000, 2001, 2002, 2003, 2009

The Grand Rapids Rampage was an arena football team based in Grand Rapids, Michigan. The team began play in 1998 in the Arena Football League as an expansion team. They were last coached by Steve Thonn. Their home arena was the Van Andel Arena.

== History ==
In 1997, Dan DeVos was granted an expansion AFL franchise for the 1998 season, and was awarded the remains of the dormant Massachusetts Marauders franchise out of bankruptcy court. That team's first incarnation, the Detroit Drive, had been the league's first dynasty; the Drive had advanced to the ArenaBowl in all six years they played in Detroit, winning four times. They moved to Worcester, Massachusetts for the 1994 season before folding. Due to the four-year period of dormancy, the Rampage did not claim the Drive/Marauders' history as their own. Grand Rapids was the smallest market in which the AFL had a franchise at the times of its first/2009 disbanding.

The Rampage played in the Van Andel Arena, which is also the home of the AHL's Grand Rapids Griffins. They competed in the Central Division of the American Conference.

The Grand Rapids Rampage started play in 1998 under coach Michael Trigg. In 2001, with notable players Clint Dolezel, and Terrill Shaw, the Rampage went on to win their first ArenaBowl. This game was broadcast live on the ABC Network.

The Rampage's official mascot was a Rhinoceros named Blitz.

The Rampage had a rivalry with the Nashville Kats, one which dates back to the original Kats. This rivalry solidified with the Rampage's defeat of Nashville in ArenaBowl XV.

The Rampage also shared a rivalry with the Chicago Rush, known as the Amtrak Classic, after the Amtrak railway system which connects the two cities. On July 6, 2008, the Amtrak Classic added an interesting chapter as the Rampage, losers of their last six meetings with Chicago, defeated their heavily favored opponents on the road. Grand Rapids entered the game as a 6 seed, and upended the #1 seeded Rush 58–41, in a game of controversial penalties and brawls.

On March 5, 2010, it was announced that the Rampage were officially out of business and had no plans to return.

On February 14, 2024, a new website was created for the Rampage, announcing an anticipated return to spring football as part of the inaugural 2025 season in the National Gridiron League (NGL). On January 10, 2025, the decision was made to delay the Rampage's NGL debut until the league's second season in 2026. No staff associated with the new Rampage franchise were announced.

== Logo ==
The Rampage's logo was a red rhinoceros. Its end zone featured the team's secondary logo. However, it was changed to 'Arena Football' during the ArenaBowl in 2001.

== Rampage highlights ==
- On Sunday, June 23, 2002, the Rampage hosted a game against the Georgia Force. After a low-scoring first quarter, the Rampage took a 28–15 halftime lead. However, the Force refused to go down, as they had a 41–35 lead with only 12 seconds left in the game. On one play, Quarterback Clint Dolezel threw a game-winning 31-yd touchdown pass to Offensive Specialist Steve Smith (who hadn't played a down that game until the final play). The Rampage would win 42–41. On the AFL's 20 Greatest Highlights Countdown, this is ranked at #13.
- On Saturday, February 5, 2005, in a road game against their division-rival, the Colorado Crush, Rampage quarterback Michael Bishop became the first Arena Football League player to run for 100 yards in a single game. It was only Bishop's third-ever start, yet he accomplished this feat on just six attempts. Despite falling 72–56, Bishop's helped set a bold new record. On the AFL's 20 Greatest Highlights Countdown, this is ranked at #12.
- In a pregame warm-up, quarterback Michael Bishop threw a pass from one end zone, across the field, through the uprights and into the stands. On the AFL's 20 Greatest Highlights Countdown, this is tied at #9.
- On Monday, March 24, 2008, The Rampage set the AFL record for the most points scored in a single game by a road team, beating the Kansas City Brigade 92–52. James Macpherson went 24–27, nine touchdowns, and 307 yards in his first start for the Rampage. MacPherson would later go on to break the franchise record for touchdown passes in a later game.

== Season-by-season ==
ArenaBowl champions	ArenaBowl appearance	Division champions	Playoff berth

Season	League	Conference	Division	Regular season			Postseason results
Season	League	Conference	Division	Finish	Wins	Losses	Postseason results
Grand Rapids Rampage
1998	AFL	American	Central	4th	3	11	
1999	AFL	American	Central	2nd	8	6	Lost Quarterfinals (Albany) 55–45
2000	AFL	American	Central	3rd	6	8	Lost Wild Card Round (Nashville) 57–14
2001	AFL	American	Central	1st	11	3	Won Quarterfinals (Chicago) 53–21; Won Semifinals (Indiana) 83–70; Won ArenaBowl XV (Nashville) 64–42
2002	AFL	American	Central	2nd	8	6	Lost Wild Card Round (Carolina) 72–64
2003	AFL	American	Central	2nd	8	8	Lost Wild Card Round (Detroit) 55–54
2004	AFL	American	Central	5th	1	15	
2005	AFL	American	Central	4th	4	12	
2006	AFL	American	Central	4th	5	11	
2007	AFL	American	Central	5th	4	12	
2008	AFL	American	Central	3rd	6	10	Won Wild Card Round (Arizona) 48–41; Won Divisional Round (Chicago) 58–41; Lost Conference Championship (San Jose) 81–55
2009	The AFL suspended operations for the 2009 season.						
Total					64	102	(includes only regular season)
Total					5	5	(includes only the postseason)
Total					69	107	(includes both regular season and postseason)

== Notable players ==
=== Arena Football Hall of Famers ===
Grand Rapids Rampage Hall of Famers
No.	Name	Year inducted	Position(s)	Years w/ Rampage
13	Clint Dolezel	2012	QB	2001–2003
84	Fred Gayles	2002	WR/DB	1998

=== Individual awards ===
Kicker of the Year
Season	Player	Position
2001	Brian Gowins	K

Most Inspirational Player of the Year
Season	Player	Position
2001	JoJo Polk	DB

=== All-Arena players ===
The following Rampage players were named to All-Arena Teams:

- QB Craig Kusick, Jr. (1), Clint Dolezel (1)
- WR Kenny Higgins (1)
- WR/DB Willis Marshall (1)
- WR/LB Michael Baker (1)
- K Brian Gowins (1)

=== All-Ironman players ===
The following Rampage players were named to All-Ironman Teams:

- FB/LB Chris Ryan (1), Chris Avery (2)
- WR/DB Timon Marshall (1), Jermaine Lewis (1)
- WR/LB Michael Baker (1), Jerome Riley (1)
- OL/DL Winfield Garnett (1)

=== All-Rookie players ===
The following Rampage players were named to All-Rookie Teams:

- OL/DL Buster Stanley, Corey Mayfield, Israel Raybon
- LB Michael McFadden
- DB Chris Martin
- DS JoJo Polk
- K Brian Gowins, Peter Martinez

== Venue location and front office ==
The Grand Rapids Rampage played in the Van Andel Arena, which is located in downtown Grand Rapids.

== Coaches ==
Head coach	Tenure	Regular season record (W–L)	Postseason record (W–L)	Most recent coaching staff	Notes
Michael Trigg	1998–2003	43–41	3–4		AFL Coach of the year (2001). ArenaBowl XV winning head coach. Assistant coach: Will McClay (1998 - 1999) became head coach of the Philadelphia Soul (2004).
Bob Cortese	2004	1–10	0–0		Let go during the season
Rick Frazier	2004	0–5	0–0		Replaced Bob Cortese during the season.
Sparky McEwen	2005–2007	13–35	0–0		Grand Rapids assistant coach (2001 - 2003).
Steve Thonn	2008	6–10	2–1	DC / Director of Player Personnel: Ron Selesky; Line coach: Darrin Kenney; ST Coordinator and FB / LB coach: Paul Reinke; Manager of Football Ops. / Assist. coach: Rod Miller	
