= List of Colorado Buffaloes in the NFL draft =

This is a list of Colorado Buffaloes football players in the NFL draft.

== Key ==
B	Back	K	Kicker	NT	Nose tackle
C	Center	LB	Linebacker	FB	Fullback
DB	Defensive back	P	Punter	HB	Halfback
DE	Defensive end	QB	Quarterback	WR	Wide receiver
DT	Defensive tackle	RB	Running back	G	Guard
E	End	T	Offensive tackle	TE	Tight end

== Selections ==
Year	Round	Pick	Player	Team	Position
1938	1	4	Byron White	Pittsburgh Steelers	B
1938	4	28	Gene Moore	Brooklyn Dodgers	C
1938	8	65	Leon Lavington	Chicago Cardinals	E
1941	3	24	Leo Stasica	Brooklyn Dodgers	B
1941	12	104	Harold Punches	Cleveland Rams	G
1942	19	171	Ray Jenkins	Pittsburgh Steelers	B
1943	15	131	Dick Woodward	Detroit Lions	E
1944	7	57	Paul Briggs	Detroit Lions	T
1944	26	266	Stan Hendrickson	Detroit Lions	E
1944	27	284	Jim Smith	Cleveland Rams	T
1945	22	222	Don Fabling	Brooklyn Dodgers	B
1945	30	308	LaMar Dykstra	Brooklyn Dodgers	B
1946	8	64	John Ziegler	Chicago Bears	B
1946	9	77	Ernie Lewis	Philadelphia Eagles	B
1946	10	85	Walt Clay	New York Giants	B
1946	11	92	Bob West	Boston Yanks	B
1946	18	170	Bob Wise	Los Angeles Rams	G
1946	19	179	LaMar Dykstra	Washington Redskins	B
1946	21	197	Don Fabling	Philadelphia Eagles	B
1946	27	260	Joe Ben Dickey	Los Angeles Rams	B
1947	21	190	Bob West	Green Bay Packers	B
1947	22	202	Maurice Reilly	Green Bay Packers	B
1948	11	90	Johnny Zisch	Los Angeles Rams	E
1948	22	197	Jack McEwen	Detroit Lions	B
1948	26	241	Aubrey Allen	Green Bay Packers	T
1951	7	78	Dick Punches	Chicago Cardinals	T
1951	15	174	Vic Thomas	Washington Redskins	T
1952	4	38	Merwin Hodel	New York Giants	B
1952	5	50	Jack Jorguson	New York Yanks	T
1952	29	345	Chuck Mosher	San Francisco 49ers	E
1953	7	80	Don Branby	New York Giants	E
1953	10	117	Tom Brookshier	Philadelphia Eagles	B
1953	19	227	Tom Cain	Cleveland Browns	G
1953	28	331	Zack Jordan	Green Bay Packers	B
1954	2	14	Gary Knafelc	Chicago Cardinals	E
1954	21	242	Jim Stander	Chicago Cardinals	T
1955	3	34	Carroll Hardy	San Francisco 49ers	B
1955	4	38	Frank Bernardi	Chicago Cardinals	B
1957	7	81	Wally Merz	Washington Redskins	T
1957	7	83	Gerry Leahy	Detroit Lions	E
1957	16	186	John Bayuk	Cleveland Browns	B
1957	28	331	Walt Schnieter	Baltimore Colts	T
1958	2	24	Bob Stransky	Baltimore Colts	B
1959	3	25	Boyd Dowler	Green Bay Packers	B
1959	3	29	Eddie Dove	San Francisco 49ers	B
1959	5	53	John Wooten	Cleveland Browns	G
1959	21	243	Bob Salerno	Philadelphia Eagles	G
1959	27	318	Mel Semenko	San Francisco 49ers	T
1961	12	166	John Denvir	Green Bay Packers	T
1961	16	212	Jerry Steffen	Dallas Cowboys	B
1962	1	13	Jerry Hillebrand	New York Giants	E
1962	5	62	Ted Woods	San Francisco 49ers	RB
1962	7	86	Jim Perkins	Philadelphia Eagles	T
1962	10	140	Gale Weidner	Green Bay Packers	QB
1962	14	184	Gary Henson	Los Angeles Rams	E
1962	15	208	Mike Woulfe	Philadelphia Eagles	G
1962	19	253	Claude Crabb	Washington Redskins	B
1963	5	70	Dan Grimm	Green Bay Packers	T
1963	11	144	Ralph Heck	Philadelphia Eagles	LB
1963	15	201	Leon Mavity	Baltimore Colts	DB
1963	18	244	Bill Frank	Dallas Cowboys	T
1964	14	193	Bill Harris	New York Giants	B
1964	17	230	Jerry McClurg	Minnesota Vikings	E
1965	6	80	Bill Symons	Green Bay Packers	RB
1967	3	75	Bill Fairband	Oakland Raiders	LB
1967	8	186	Sam Harris	New Orleans Saints	TE
1967	8	188	Estes Banks	Oakland Raiders	RB
1967	11	282	Bill Sabatino	Cleveland Browns	DE
1967	16	412	Lynn Baker	Philadelphia Eagles	DB
1968	3	73	Dick Anderson	Miami Dolphins	DB
1968	12	326	Larry Plantz	Oakland Raiders	WR
1968	13	329	Bill Harris	Atlanta Falcons	RB
1968	13	330	Charlie Greer	Denver Broncos	DB
1968	14	380	John Farler	Green Bay Packers	WR
1968	15	384	Wilmer Cooks	New Orleans Saints	RB
1968	17	446	Frank Bosch	Washington Redskins	DT
1969	2	32	Mike Montier	Boston Patriots	G
1969	4	84	Mike Schnitker	Denver Broncos	LB
1969	14	363	Dave Bartelt	Baltimore Colts	LB
1970	1	11	Bobby Anderson	Denver Broncos	RB
1970	2	43	Bill Brundige	Washington Redskins	DE
1970	3	69	Eric Harris	St. Louis Cardinals	DB
1970	5	125	Steve Engel	Cleveland Browns	RB
1971	7	173	James Cooch	St. Louis Cardinals	DB
1971	9	189	Dennis Havig	Atlanta Falcons	G
1971	10	254	Don Popplewell	Los Angeles Rams	C
1971	11	277	Rick Ogle	St. Louis Cardinals	LB
1972	1	16	Herb Orvis	Detroit Lions	DE
1972	4	98	Cliff Branch	Oakland Raiders	WR
1972	7	166	John Tarver	New England Patriots	RB
1972	8	205	Scott Mahoney	Kansas City Chiefs	G
1972	10	237	Brian Foster	Cincinnati Bengals	DB
1972	11	263	Larry Brunson	Denver Broncos	WR
1972	15	385	Carl Taibi	Washington Redskins	DE
1973	2	31	Cullen Bryant	Los Angeles Rams	RB
1973	16	415	Mike Wedman	Washington Redskins	K
1973	7	423	John Stearns	Buffalo Bills	DB
1974	1	2	Bo Matthews	San Diego Chargers	RB
1974	1	7	J. V. Cain	St. Louis Cardinals	TE
1974	2	48	Charlie Davis	Cincinnati Bengals	RB
1974	3	56	Greg Horton	Chicago Bears	G
1974	4	92	Ozell Collie	Denver Broncos	DB
1974	6	144	Jon Keyworth	Washington Redskins	TE
1974	9	218	Mark Sens	Washington Redskins	DE
1974	13	334	Fred Lima	Dallas Cowboys	K
1974	16	394	Randy Geist	Chicago Bears	DB
1974	16	402	Mark Cooney	Green Bay Packers	LB
1975	4	98	Rod Perry	Los Angeles Rams	DB
1975	5	124	Harvey Goodman	St. Louis Cardinals	T
1975	6	133	Doug Payton	Atlanta Falcons	G
1975	7	182	Wayne Mattingly	Pittsburgh Steelers	T
1975	16	409	Bubba Bridges	Denver Broncos	DT
1975	17	422	Greg Westbrooks	New Orleans Saints	LB
1975	17	435	Jeff Turcotte	Buffalo Bills	DE
1976	1	12	Pete Brock	New England Patriots	C
1976	1	13	Troy Archer	New York Giants	DE
1976	1	23	Mark Koncar	Green Bay Packers	T
1976	3	61	Steve Young	Tampa Bay Buccaneers	T
1976	3	65	Dave Logan	Cleveland Browns	WR
1976	3	72	Mike McCoy	Green Bay Packers	DB
1976	7	208	Dave Williams	Dallas Cowboys	RB
1976	8	230	Bob Simpson	Miami Dolphins	T
1976	8	231	Terry Kunz	Oakland Raiders	RB
1976	10	277	Whitney Paul	Kansas City Chiefs	DE
1976	10	291	Gary Campbell	Pittsburgh Steelers	LB
1977	2	35	Mike Davis	Oakland Raiders	DB
1977	2	37	Tony Reed	Kansas City Chiefs	RB
1977	2	43	Mike Spivey	Chicago Bears	DB
1977	2	50	Billy Waddy	Los Angeles Rams	RB
1977	2	52	Don Hasselbeck	New England Patriots	TE
1977	6	153	Emery Moorehead	New York Giants	WR
1977	7	175	Charles Johnson	Philadelphia Eagles	DT
1977	8	207	Horace Perkins	Miami Dolphins	DB
1977	12	335	Jim Kelleher	Minnesota Vikings	RB
1978	2	37	Odis McKinney	New York Giants	DB
1978	3	80	Leon White	Los Angeles Rams	C
1978	4	95	Brian Cabral	Atlanta Falcons	LB
1978	12	307	Willie Brock	Kansas City Chiefs	C
1979	3	75	James Mayberry	Atlanta Falcons	RB
1979	4	95	Matt Miller	Cleveland Browns	T
1979	6	138	Ruben Vaughan	San Francisco 49ers	DT
1979	10	252	Howard Ballage	San Francisco 49ers	DB
1979	10	272	Mike Kozlowski	Miami Dolphins	RB
1979	12	323	Stuard Walker	Atlanta Falcons	LB
1980	1	8	Mark Haynes	New York Giants	DB
1980	1	12	Stan Brock	New Orleans Saints	T
1980	3	78	Bill Roe	Dallas Cowboys	LB
1980	4	95	Jesse Johnson	New York Jets	DB
1980	5	136	Laval Short	Denver Broncos	DT
1980	6	146	Mike Davis	Atlanta Falcons	DB
1980	6	149	George Visger	New York Jets	DE
1981	7	188	Steve Doolittle	Buffalo Bills	LB
1981	8	211	Bob Niziolek	Detroit Lions	TE
1981	11	279	Lance Olander	Seattle Seahawks	RB
1982	5	192	Rich Umphrey	New York Giants	C
1982	7	178	Bob Sebro	St. Louis Cardinals	C
1982	10	272	Vic James	Buffalo Bills	DB
1984	2	40	Victor Scott	Dallas Cowboys	DB
1984	9	226	Jeff Donaldson	Houston Oilers	DB
1984	9	240	Dave Hestera	Kansas City Chiefs	TE
1984	12	336	Randy Essington	Los Angeles Raiders	QB
1985	8	213	Lee Rouson	New York Giants	RB
1986	5	128	Dan McMillen	Philadelphia Eagles	DE
1986	6	139	Ron Brown	New York Giants	WR
1986	9	231	Lyle Pickens	Detroit Lions	DB
1986	10	264	Don Fairbanks	Seattle Seahawks	DE
1987	6	166	Jon Embree	Los Angeles Rams	TE
1987	8	215	Solomon Wilcots	Cincinnati Bengals	DB
1988	4	102	Barry Helton	San Francisco 49ers	P
1988	8	208	David Tate	Chicago Bears	DB
1988	11	305	Curt Koch	Washington Redskins	DE
1990	5	118	Jeff Campbell	Detroit Lions	WR
1990	8	201	J. J. Flannigan	San Diego Chargers	RB
1991	1	13	Mike Pritchard	Atlanta Falcons	WR
1991	1	18	Alfred Williams	Cincinnati Bengals	LB
1991	2	39	Eric Bieniemy	San Diego Chargers	RB
1991	2	55	Kanavis McGhee	New York Giants	LB
1991	3	69	Dave McCloughan	Indianapolis Colts	DB
1991	4	96	Mark Vander Poel	Indianapolis Colts	T
1991	6	164	Joe Garten	Green Bay Packers	C
1991	8	202	Tim James	New York Jets	DB
1991	10	269	Ariel Solomon	Pittsburgh Steelers	T
1992	3	67	Joel Steed	Pittsburgh Steelers	DT
1992	6	143	Rico Smith	Cleveland Browns	WR
1992	9	242	Darian Hagan	San Francisco 49ers	WR
1992	9	244	Jay Leeuwenburg	Kansas City Chiefs	C
1993	1	23	Deon Figures	Pittsburgh Steelers	DB
1993	1	24	Leonard Renfro	Philadelphia Eagles	DT
1993	2	44	Chad Brown	Pittsburgh Steelers	LB
1993	4	105	Ronnie Bradford	Miami Dolphins	DB
1993	7	181	Greg Biekert	Los Angeles Raiders	LB
1994	1	17	Charles Johnson	Pittsburgh Steelers	WR
1994	2	64	Sam Rogers	Buffalo Bills	LB
1994	4	112	Ronnie Woolfork	Miami Dolphins	LB
1994	6	164	Lamont Warren	Indianapolis Colts	RB
1994	6	193	Mitch Berger	Philadelphia Eagles	P
1994	7	205	Dennis Collier	Chicago Bears	DB
1995	1	4	Michael Westbrook	Washington Redskins	WR
1995	1	21	Rashaan Salaam	Chicago Bears	RB
1995	2	39	Christian Fauria	Seattle Seahawks	TE
1995	2	57	Ted Johnson	New England Patriots	LB
1995	2	60	Kordell Stewart	Pittsburgh Steelers	QB
1995	3	65	Darius Holland	Green Bay Packers	DT
1995	3	71	Chris Hudson	Jacksonville Jaguars	DB
1995	5	149	Derek West	Indianapolis Colts	T
1995	6	185	Shannon Clavelle	Buffalo Bills	DT
1995	6	200	Tony Berti	San Diego Chargers	T
1996	4	101	Heath Irwin	New England Patriots	G
1996	4	128	Daryl Price	San Francisco 49ers	DE
1996	6	192	Bryan Stoltenberg	San Diego Chargers	C
1996	6	209	T. J. Cunningham	Seattle Seahawks	DB
1996	7	234	Kerry Hicks	Carolina Panthers	DT
1997	1	10	Chris Naeole	New Orleans Saints	G
1997	1	27	Rae Carruth	Carolina Panthers	WR
1997	2	51	Greg Jones	Washington Redskins	LB
1997	4	130	Matt Russell	Detroit Lions	LB
1997	7	202	Steve Rosga	New York Jets	DB
1997	7	207	Koy Detmer	Philadelphia Eagles	QB
1998	5	133	Ryan Sutter	Baltimore Ravens	DB
1998	5	145	Ron Merkerson	New England Patriots	LB
1998	6	186	Ryan Olson	Pittsburgh Steelers	DT
1998	7	193	Phil Savoy	Arizona Cardinals	WR
1998	7	196	Vili Maumau	Carolina Panthers	DT
1998	7	240	Melvin Thomas	Philadelphia Eagles	G
1999	4	100	Hannibal Navies	Carolina Panthers	LB
1999	5	148	Darrin Chiaverini	Cleveland Browns	WR
1999	6	180	Marcus Washington	New England Patriots	DB
2000	3	84	Ben Kelly	Miami Dolphins	DB
2000	6	203	Damen Wheeler	San Diego Chargers	DB
2000	6	206	Brad Bedell	Cleveland Browns	G
2000	7	225	Rashidi Barnes	Cleveland Browns	DB
2002	1	21	Daniel Graham	New England Patriots	TE
2002	2	37	Andre Gurode	Dallas Cowboys	G
2002	2	58	Michael Lewis	Philadelphia Eagles	DB
2002	5	139	Justin Bannan	Buffalo Bills	DT
2002	7	259	Victor Rogers	Detroit Lions	T
2003	1	32	Tyler Brayton	Oakland Raiders	DE
2003	3	90	Donald Strickland	Indianapolis Colts	DB
2003	3	93	Chris Brown	Tennessee Titans	RB
2003	7	219	Justin Bates	Dallas Cowboys	G
2003	7	236	Brandon Drumm	Detroit Lions	RB
2003	7	249	Wayne Lucier	New York Giants	C
2004	5	157	D. J. Hackett	Seattle Seahawks	WR
2004	6	196	Sean Tufts	Carolina Panthers	LB
2006	2	46	Joe Klopfenstein	St. Louis Rams	TE
2006	5	147	Jeremy Bloom	Philadelphia Eagles	WR
2006	5	166	Quinn Sypniewski	Baltimore Ravens	TE
2006	6	180	Lawrence Vickers	Cleveland Browns	RB
2007	6	193	Mason Crosby	Green Bay Packers	K
2007	7	238	Abraham Wright	Miami Dolphins	DE
2008	2	45	Jordon Dizon	Detroit Lions	LB
2008	2	62	Terrence Wheatley	New England Patriots	DB
2009	7	218	Brad Jones	Green Bay Packers	LB
2011	1	17	Nate Solder	New England Patriots	T
2011	1	27	Jimmy Smith	Baltimore Ravens	DB
2011	4	118	Jalil Brown	Kansas City Chiefs	DB
2011	7	227	Scotty McKnight	New York Jets	WR
2012	5	160	Ryan Miller	Cleveland Browns	G
2012	7	231	Toney Clemons	Pittsburgh Steelers	WR
2013	4	109	David Bakhtiari	Green Bay Packers	T
2013	6	172	Nick Kasa	Oakland Raiders	TE
2014	2	45	Paul Richardson	Seattle Seahawks	WR
2017	2	60	Chidobe Awuzie	Dallas Cowboys	DB
2017	3	66	Ahkello Witherspoon	San Francisco 49ers	DB
2017	4	111	Tedric Thompson	Seattle Seahawks	DB
2017	7	246	Jordan Carrell	Dallas Cowboys	DT
2018	2	58	Isaiah Oliver	Atlanta Falcons	DB
2019	6	187	Juwann Winfree	Denver Broncos	WR
2020	2	42	Laviska Shenault	Jacksonville Jaguars	WR
2020	3	103	Davion Taylor	Philadelphia Eagles	LB
2020	7	226	Arlington Hambright	Chicago Bears	G
2021	6	197	Will Sherman	New England Patriots	T
2025	1	2	Travis Hunter	Jacksonville Jaguars	WR/CB
2025	5	144	Shedeur Sanders	Cleveland Browns	QB
2025	6	203	LaJohntay Wester	Baltimore Ravens	WR
2025	6	208	Jimmy Horn Jr.	Carolina Panthers	WR

== Notable undrafted players ==
Note: No drafts held before 1920

Year	Player	Position	Debut Team	Notes
1984	Vince Rafferty	C	Dallas Cowboys	—
1987	Eric Coyle	C	Washington Redskins	—
1988	Mickey Pruitt	LB	Chicago Bears	—
1989	Keith English	P	Los Angeles Raiders	—
1989	Erik Norgard	C	Houston Oilers	—
1991	Garry Howe	DT	Pittsburgh Steelers	—
1991	Tom Rouen	P	New York Giants	—
1997	Matt Lepsis	T	Denver Broncos	—
1999	Marlon Barnes	RB	Oakland Raiders	—
2000	Fred Jones	LB	Buffalo Bills	—
2000	Brody Liddiard	LS	Minnesota Vikings	—
2001	Tom Ashworth	T	San Francisco 49ers	—
2002	Jashon Sykes	LB	Denver Broncos	—
2006	Brian Iwuh	LB	Jacksonville Jaguars	—
2006	Joel Klatt	QB	New Orleans Saints	—
2008	Tyler Polumbus	T	Denver Broncos	—
2009	Patrick Williams	WR	Green Bay Packers	—
2010	Justin Drescher	LS	Atlanta Falcons	—
2012	Tyler Hansen	QB	Cincinnati Bengals	—
2016	Ken Crawley	CB	New Orleans Saints	—
2016	Nelson Sprauce	WR	Los Angeles Rams	—
2017	Sefo Liufau	QB	Tampa Bay Buccaneers	—
2018	Shay Fields	WR	Washington Redskins	—
2018	Phillip Lindsay	RB	Denver Broncos	—
2020	Steven Montez	QB	Washington Football Team	—
2022	Nate Landman	LB	Atlanta Falcons	—
2023	Daniel Arias	QB	Arizona Cardinals	—
2023	Brady Russell	TE	Philadelphia Eagles	—
2024	Derrick McLendon	LB	Carolina Panthers	—
2024	Leonard Payne	DE	Miami Dolphins	—
2024	Xavier Weaver	WR	Arizona Cardinals	—
2025	Shilo Sanders	S	Tampa Bay Buccaneers	—
2026	Xavier Hill	OL	New York Jets	—
2026	Preston Hodge	CB	Jacksonville Jaguars	—
2026	Amari McNeill	DT	Kansas City Chiefs	—
