= 1989 Nebraska Cornhuskers football team =

American college football season

1989 Nebraska Cornhuskers football

Fiesta Bowl, L 17–41 vs. Florida State
- Conference: Big Eight Conference

Ranking
- Coaches: No. 12
- AP: No. 11
- Record: 10–2 (6–1 Big 8)
- Head coach: Tom Osborne (17th season)
- Offensive scheme: I formation
- Defensive coordinator: Charlie McBride (9th season)
- Base defense: 3–4
- Home stadium: Memorial Stadium

1989 Big Eight Conference football standings
	Conf.					Overall
Team	W		L		T	W		L		T
No. 4 Colorado $	7	–	0	–	0	11	–	1	–	0
No. 11 Nebraska	6	–	1	–	0	10	–	2	–	0
Oklahoma	5	–	2	–	0	7	–	4	–	0
Iowa State	4	–	3	–	0	6	–	5	–	0
Oklahoma State	3	–	4	–	0	4	–	7	–	0
Kansas	2	–	5	–	0	4	–	7	–	0
Missouri	1	–	6	–	0	2	–	9	–	0
Kansas State	0	–	7	–	0	1	–	10	–	0
$ – Conference champion; Rankings from AP Poll

The 1989 Nebraska Cornhuskers football team represented the University of Nebraska–Lincoln in the 1989 NCAA Division I-A football season. The team was coached by Tom Osborne and played their home games in Memorial Stadium in Lincoln, Nebraska.

== Schedule ==
Date	Time	Opponent	Rank	Site	TV	Result	Attendance	Source
September 9	1:30 pm	Northern Illinois*	No. 4	Memorial Stadium; Lincoln, NE		W 48–17	76,194	
September 16	1:30 pm	Utah*	No. 4	Memorial Stadium; Lincoln, NE		W 42–30	76,333	
September 23	7:00 pm	at Minnesota*	No. 3	Hubert H. Humphrey Metrodome; Minneapolis, MN (rivalry)		W 48–0	58,368	
September 30	1:30 pm	Oregon State*	No. 3	Memorial Stadium; Lincoln, NE		W 35–7	76,290	
October 7	1:30 pm	Kansas State	No. 4	Memorial Stadium; Lincoln, NE (rivalry)		W 58–7	76,265	
October 14	1:30 pm	at Missouri	No. 4	Faurot Field; Columbia, MO (rivalry)	PPV	W 50–7	55,620	
October 21	1:30 pm	at Oklahoma State	No. 4	Lewis Field; Stillwater OK		W 48–23	40,000	
October 28	1:30 pm	Iowa State^{†}	No. 4	Memorial Stadium; Lincoln, NE (rivalry)		W 49–17	76,371	
November 4	1:30 pm	at No. 2 Colorado	No. 3	Folsom Field; Boulder, CO (rivalry)	CBS	L 21–27	52,877	
November 11	1:30 pm	Kansas	No. 6	Memorial Stadium; Lincoln, NE (rivalry)		W 51–14	76,232	
November 18	1:30 pm	Oklahoma	No. 6	Memorial Stadium; Lincoln, NE (rivalry)		W 42–25	76,404	
January 1, 1990	3:30 pm	vs. No. 5 Florida State*	No. 6	Sun Devil Stadium; Tempe, Arizona (Fiesta Bowl)	NBC	L 17–41	73,953	
*Non-conference game; ^{†}Homecoming; Rankings from AP Poll released prior to the game; All times are in Central time

== Roster and coaching staff ==
1989 Nebraska Cornhuskers football team roster
Players
Coaches
Offense

Pos.	#	Name	Class
IB	4	George Achola	So
SE	82	Chip Bahe	Sr
IB		Andrew Scott Baldwin	So
SE		Paul Baumert	So
WB	21	Richard Bell	Sr
G	69	Bill Bobbora	Sr
WB	81	Lance Bobolz	Jr
OT	76	Brian Boerboom	So
SE	31	Jon Bostick	So
FB	29	Bryan Carpenter	Sr
G	65	Jeff Chaney	So
C		Terris Chorney	So
IB	32	Ken Clark	Sr
TE	98	Joe D'Alesio	Sr
OT		Jason Daniel	So
WB	6	Brad Devall	Jr
OT		Monte Dickson	So
WB	11	Mark Dowse	So
QB	12	Jerry Dunlap	Jr
QB		Pete Maletto	Jr
C	58	David Edeal	Jr
OT	73	Steve Engstrom	Jr
OT		Terry Eyman	Jr
C	52	Roger Fitzke	Sr
IB	23	Leodis Flowers	So
TE	80	Chris Garrett	So
QB	14	Gerry Gdowski	Sr
FB		Robert Glantz	So
OT	70	Doug Glaser	Sr
QB	1	Mike Grant	So
SE	19	Morgan Gregory	Sr
QB	15	Tom Haase	So
WB	33	Tyrone Hughes	Fr
FB	41	Tim Johnk	So
OT		Mike Johnston	So
QB	2	Mickey Joseph	So
G	62	Erik Kiehn	Jr
FB		Jerry Kleidosty	So
TE	85	Monte Kratzenstein	Sr
G		Pat Kudrna	So
TE		Doug Langemeier	So
TE		Daryl Leise	So
G	67	Rob Leuck	Sr
FB	18	Lance Lewis	So
TE		Bill Liska
QB	10	Keithen McCant	So
SE	83	Tim McCoy	Sr
IB		Andre McDuffy	So
G	54	Chris O'Gara	Sr
TE		John Parrella	So
G		Scott Peterson	So
SE		Dan Pleasant	So
WB		Kelly Prater	So
OT	78	Tom Punt	Jr
OT		Ray Reifenrath	So
IB	20	Terry Rodgers	Sr
G	64	John Roschal	Sr
G	64	Brad Rother	Sr
FB	25	Sam Schmidt	Sr
G	75	Will Shields	Fr
FB	34	Omar Soto	Jr
WB	22	Nate Turner	So
G	66	Jim Wanek	Jr
TE	89	William Washington	Fr
WB		Lamont White	So
G	61	Erik Wiegert	So
C	68	Jake Young	Sr
C	53	Bill Ziegelbein	So

Defense

Pos.	#	Name	Class
CB	28	Eric Anderson	Jr
DT	90	Le Andre Anderson	Jr
ILB		Alvin Banks	So
DT	94	Brian Brown	So
DT	95	Paul Brungardt	Jr
FS	8	Tyrone Byrd	Fr
ILB	49	Chris Caliendo	Sr
OLB		Kylin Camp	So
FS	31	Steve Carmer	So
SS	17	Reggie Cooper	Jr
SS	24	Curtis Cotton	So
CB	45	Jon Crippen	Jr
OLB	88	Mike Croel	Jr
SS	7	Jim Dobesh
SS		Darin Duin	So
MG	63	Brian Edgren	Jr
MG	97	Pat Engelbert	So
ILB	43	Shane Geiken	So
CB		Sam Goff	So
ILB	39	Mark Hagge	Sr
OLB	92	Corey Hedrick	Jr
CB	9	Robert Hicks	Jr
OLB	93	Travis Hill	Fr
ILB	55	Randall Jobman	Sr
MG		Greg Koellner	So
OLB		Justin Krantz	So
ILB	35	Scott Kurtz	Jr
CB	3	Tyrone Legette	So
CB	5	Tahaun Lewis	Jr
DT	99	Kevin Miller	Sr
OLB	42	Jeff Mills	Sr
CB		Steve Mitchell	So
ILB	46	Brian Mohnsen	So
MG	13	Junior Monarrez	Sr
MG	74	Mike Murray	Sr
FS		Scott Olson	Jr
ILB	37	Mike Petko	So
CB	38	Bruce Pickens	Jr
OLB	83	Brad Reilly	Jr
FS	6	John Reece	Fr
FS	26	Marvin Sanders	Sr
DT	56	Joe Sims	Jr
OLB	86	Joe Spitzenberger	Jr
OLB	87	Dan Svehla	Jr
OLB	87	Matt Svehla	Jr
FS	1	Will Thomas	So
ILB	40	Pat Tyrance	Jr
DT	75	Ray Valladao	Sr
DT	57	Kenny Walker	Jr
DT	91	Kent Wells	Sr
OLB	84	Rick Wendland	Jr
OLB	96	David White	Fr
SS	27	Freeman White	So
ILB		Paul Wightman	So
SS		Gordon Wilson	So
ILB	51	Andrew Zacharias	So

Special teams

Pos.	#	Name	Class
PK	44	Gregg Barrios	Jr
P	48	Scott Beckler	Sr
PK	36	Todd Bennett	Jr
PK	16	Chris Drennan	Sr
P		Chuck Humphrey	So
P/PK	7	Tom Janky	Jr
P		Shawn Liliedahl	So
P	47	Mike Stigge	Fr

Head coach

- Tom Osborne
  17th season
  26th year at Nebraska
  Alma mater: Nebraska

Coordinators/assistant coaches

- Charlie McBride
  9th season as DC/DL coach
  13th year at Nebraska
  Alma mater: Colorado
- Kevin Steele
  1st season as LB coach
  1st year at Nebraska
  Alma mater: Tennessee
- Ron Brown
  3rd season as WR/TE coach
  3rd year at Nebraska
  Alma mater: Brown
- Dan Young
  7th season as OL/K coach
  7th year at Nebraska
  Alma mater: Reed
- Milt Tenopir
  16th season as OL coach
  16th year at Nebraska
  Alma mater: Sterling
- Tony Samuel
  4th season as OLB coach
  4th year at Nebraska
  Alma mater: Nebraska
- George Darlington
  DB coach
  17th year at Nebraska
  Alma mater: Rutgers
- Frank Solich
  7th season as RB coach
  11th year at Nebraska
  Alma mater: Nebraska
- Boyd Epley
  21st season as S&C coach
  21st year at Nebraska
  Alma mater: Nebraska
- Jack Pierce
  11th year at Nebraska

Legend

- (C) Team captain
- (S) Suspended
- (I) Ineligible
- Injured
- Redshirt

Roster
Last update: 2011-01-17

=== Depth chart ===
Defense

FS
Tyrone Byrd
Marvin Sanders
Will Thomas

OUTSIDE	INSDIE	INSDIE	OUTSIDE
Jeff Mills	Mike Petko	Pat Tyrance	Mike Croel
Travis Hill	Randall Jobman	Chris Caliendo	David White
Joe Spitzenberger	Mark Hagge	Scott Kurtz	Dan Svehla

SS
Reggie Cooper
Curtis Cotton
Freeman White

CB
Bruce Pickens
Jon Crippen
Robert Hicks

DE	NT	DE
Ray Valladao	Mike Murray	Kent Wells
Joe Sims	Pat Engelbert	Kenny Walker
Paul Brungardt	Junior Monarrez	Le Andre Anderson

CB
Tahaun Lewis
Tyrone Legette
John Reece

Offense

SE
Jon Bostick
Morgan Gregory
Chip Bahe
⋅

LT	LG	C	RG	RT
Tom Punt	Jim Wanek	Jake Young	Bill Bobbora	Doug Glaser
Terry Eyman	Jon Roschal	David Edeal	Erik Wiegert	Brian Boerboom
Brain Boerboom	Will Shields	Roger Fitzke	Chris O'Gara	Steve Engstrom

TE
Monte Kratzenstein
Chris Garrett
William Washington

WB
Richard Bell
Nate Turner
Tyrone Hughes

QB
Gerry Gdowski
Mike Grant
Mickey Joseph
Jerry Dunlap

RB
Ken Clark
Leodis Flowers
Terry Rodgers
Andre McDuffy

FB
Bryan Carpenter
Sam Schmidt
Tim Johnk

Special teams
PK Greg Barrios
P Mike Stigge

== Game summaries ==
=== Northern Illinois ===
Northern Illinois at Nebraska [box score]

Team	1	2	3	4	Total
Northern Illinois	7	10	0	0	17
• Nebraska	7	10	21	10	48

- Date: 1989-09-09
- Location: Memorial Stadium, Lincoln, Nebraska
- Game attendance: 76,194

=== Utah ===
Utah at Nebraska [box score]

Team	1	2	3	4	Total
Utah	13	3	0	14	30
• Nebraska	7	14	7	14	42

- Date: 1989-09-16
- Location: Memorial Stadium, Lincoln, Nebraska
- Game attendance: 76,333

=== Minnesota ===
Nebraska at Minnesota [box score]

Team	1	2	3	4	Total
• Nebraska	7	17	10	14	48
Minnesota	0	0	0	0	0

- Date: 1989-09-23
- Location: Hubert H. Humphrey Metrodome, Minneapolis
- Game attendance: 58,368

=== Oregon State ===
Oregon State at Nebraska [box score]

Team	1	2	3	4	Total
Oregon State	0	0	7	0	7
• Nebraska	7	7	7	14	35

- Date: 1989-09-30
- Location: Memorial Stadium, Lincoln, Nebraska
- Game attendance: 76,290

=== Kansas State ===
Kansas State at Nebraska [box score]

Team	1	2	3	4	Total
Kansas State	0	0	7	0	7
• Nebraska	14	21	23	0	58

- Date: 1989-10-07
- Location: Memorial Stadium, Lincoln, Nebraska
- Game attendance: 76,265

=== Missouri ===
Nebraska at Missouri [box score]

Team	1	2	3	4	Total
• Nebraska	26	10	7	7	50
Missouri	0	0	7	0	7

- Date: 1989-10-14
- Location: Faurot Field, Columbia, Missouri
- Game attendance: 55,620

=== Oklahoma State ===
Nebraska at Oklahoma State [box score]

Team	1	2	3	4	Total
• Nebraska	10	10	14	14	48
Oklahoma State	3	10	3	7	23

- Date: 1989-10-21
- Location: Lewis Field, Stillwater, Oklahoma
- Game attendance: 40,000

=== Iowa State ===
Iowa State at Nebraska [box score]

Team	1	2	3	4	Total
Iowa State	7	3	7	0	17
• Nebraska	14	14	14	7	49

- Date: 1989-10-28
- Location: Memorial Stadium, Lincoln, Nebraska
- Game attendance: 52,877

=== Colorado ===
Nebraska at Colorado [box score]

Team	1	2	3	4	Total
Nebraska	7	7	7	0	21
• Colorado	14	3	7	3	27

- Date: 1989-11-04
- Location: Folsom Field, Boulder, Colorado
- Game attendance: 52,877

=== Kansas ===
Kansas at Nebraska [box score]

Team	1	2	3	4	Total
Kansas	7	0	7	0	14
• Nebraska	16	7	21	7	51

- Date: 1989-11-11
- Location: Memorial Stadium, Lincoln, Nebraska
- Game attendance: 76,232

=== Oklahoma ===
Oklahoma at Nebraska [box score]

Team	1	2	3	4	Total
Oklahoma	7	11	0	7	25
• Nebraska	22	3	14	3	42

- Date: 1989-11-18
- Location: Memorial Stadium, Lincoln, Nebraska
- Game attendance: 76,404

=== Florida State ===
Nebraska vs Florida State [box score]

Team	1	2	3	4	Total
Nebraska	7	3	0	7	17
• Florida State	0	21	20	0	41

- Date: 1990-01-01
- Location: Sun Devil Stadium, Tempe, Arizona
- Game attendance: 73,953

== Rankings ==
Ranking movements Legend: ██ Increase in ranking ██ Decrease in ranking
	Week																
Poll	Pre	1	2	3	4	5	6	7	8	9	10	11	12	13	14	15	Final
AP	3	4	4	3	3	4	4	4	4	3	6	6	6	7	6	6	11
Coaches																	12

== Awards ==
Award	Name(s)
All-America 1st team	Doug Glaser, Jake Young
All-America 2nd team	Reggie Cooper
All-America 3rd team	Ken Clark
Big 8 Offensive Player of the Year	Gerry Gdowski
Big 8 Defensive Freshman of the Year	Tyrone Byrd
All-Big 8 1st team	Ken Clark, Reggie Cooper, Gerry Gdowski, Doug Glaser, Jeff Mills, Bruce Pickens, Pat Tyrance, Kent Wells, Jake Young
All-Big 8 2nd team	Mike Croel, Mike Murray, William Washington
All-Big 8 honorable mention	Gregg Barrios, Richard Bell, Tyrone Byrd, Bryan Carpenter, Morgan Gregory, Randall Jobman, Tahaun Lewis, Mike Petko, Marvin Sanders, Jim Wanek

== NFL and pro players ==
The following Nebraska players who participated in the 1989 season later moved on to the next level and joined a professional or semi-pro team as draftees or free agents.

Name	Team
Richard Bell	Pittsburgh Steelers
Terris Chorney	Edmonton Eskimos
Ken Clark	Indianapolis Colts
Reggie Cooper	Dallas Cowboys
Mike Croel	Denver Broncos
LeRoy Etienne	San Francisco 49ers
Travis Hill	Cleveland Browns
Tyrone Hughes	New Orleans Saints
Keithen McCant	Winnipeg Blue Bombers
Jeff Mills	San Diego Chargers
John Parrella	Buffalo Bills
Bruce Pickens	Atlanta Falcons
John Reece	Kansas City Chiefs
Will Shields	Kansas City Chiefs
Joe Sims	Atlanta Falcons
Nate Turner	Buffalo Bills
Kenny Walker	Denver Broncos
Kent Wells	New York Giants
David White	New England Patriots
