= 1989 All-America college football team =

Official list of the best college football players of 1989

The 1989 All-America college football team is composed of college football players who were selected as All-Americans by various organizations and writers that chose College Football All-America Teams in 1989. The National Collegiate Athletic Association (NCAA) recognizes five selectors as "official" for the 1989 season. They are: (1) the American Football Coaches Association (AFCA); (2) the Associated Press (AP) selected based on the votes of sports writers at AP newspapers; (3) the Football Writers Association of America (FWAA); (4) the United Press International (UPI) selected based on the votes of sports writers at UPI newspapers; and (5) the Walter Camp Football Foundation (WC). Other notable selectors included Football News, the Gannett News Service, Newspaper Enterprise Association in conjunction with World Almanac, Scripps Howard (SH), and The Sporting News (TSN).

== Consensus All-Americans ==
The following charts identify the NCAA-recognized consensus All-Americans for the year 1989 and display which first-team designations they received.

=== Offense ===
Name	Position	School	Number	Official	Other
Anthony Thompson	Running back	Indiana	5/5/10	AFCA, AP, FWAA, UPI, WCFF	FN, GNS, NEA, SH, TSN
Emmitt Smith	Running back	Florida	5/4/9	AFCA, AP, FWAA, UPI, WCFF	FN, GNS, SH, TSN
Clarkston Hines	Wide receiver	Duke	5/4/9	AFCA, AP, FWAA, UPI, WCFF	FN, GNS, NEA, SH
Eric Still	Offensive guard	Tennessee	5/3/8	AFCA, AP, FWAA, UPI, WCFF	GNS, SH, TSN
Terance Mathis	Wide receiver	New Mexico	4/3/7	AFCA, AP, FWAA, UPI	GNS, SH, TSN
Joe Garten	Offensive guard	Colorado	4/3/7	AFCA, AP, FWAA, UPI	NEA, SH, TSN
Andre Ware	Quarterback	Houston	4/2/6	AP, FWAA, UPI, WCFF	GNS, SH
Jim Mabry	Offensive tackle	Arkansas	4/2/6	AFCA, AP, UPI, WCFF	FN, SH
Mike Busch	Tight end	Iowa State	3/1/4	AFCA, UPI, WCFF	SH
Jake Young	Center	Nebraska	3/1/4	AFCA, UPI, WCFF	SH
Mohammed Elewonibi	Offensive tackle	BYU	2/2/4	FWAA, UPI	GNS, NEA
Bob Kula	Offensive tackle	Michigan State	2/0/2	AFCA, AP	--

=== Defense ===
Name	Position	School	Number	Official	Other
Keith McCants	Linebacker	Alabama	5/5/10	AFCA, AP, FWAA, UPI, WCFF	FN, GNS, NEA, SH, TSN
Percy Snow	Linebacker	Michigan State	5/5/10	AFCA, AP, FWAA, UPI, WCFF	FN, GNS, NEA, SH, TSN
Todd Lyght	Defensive back	Notre Dame	5/5/10	AFCA, AP, FWAA, UPI, WCFF	FN, GNS, NEA, SH, TSN
Mark Carrier	Defensive back	USC	5/5/10	AFCA, AP, FWAA, UPI, WCFF	FN, GNS, NEA, SH, TSN
Tripp Welborne	Defensive back	Michigan	5/5/10	AFCA, AP, FWAA, UPI, WCFF	FN, GNS, NEA, SH, TSN
Moe Gardner	Nose guard	Illinois	5/4/9	AFCA, AP, FWAA, UPI, WCFF	FN, GNS, NEA, SH
Chris Zorich	Defensive tackle	Notre Dame	4/4/8	AP, FWAA, UPI, WCFF	FN, GNS, SH, TSN
Tim Ryan	Defensive tackle	USC	4/2/6	AP, FWAA, UPI, WCFF	FN, SH
Greg Mark	Defensive end	Miami (Fla)	3/3/6	AFCA, AP, UPI	GNS, SH, TSN
Alfred Williams	Linebacker	Colorado	3/3/6	AFCA, FWAA, UPI	FN, GNS, NEA
LeRoy Butler	Defensive back	Florida State	3/1/4	AP, UPI, WCFF	SH

=== Special teams ===
Name	Position	School	Number	Official	Other
Jason Hanson	Placekicker	Washington State	5/5/10	AFCA, AP, FWAA, UPI, WCFF	FN, GNS, NEA, SH, TSN
Tom Rouen	Punter	Colorado	4/3/7	AP, FWAA, UPI, WCFF	GNS, NEA, SH

== Full selections - offense ==
=== Quarterbacks ===
- Andre Ware, Houston (CFHOF) (AP-1, FWAA, UPI-1, WCFF, GNS, NEA-2, SH)
- Major Harris, West Virginia (CFHOF) (AFCA, AP-2, GNS, NEA-1)
- Tony Rice, Notre Dame (FN, GNS)
- Darian Hagan, Colorado (AP-3, UPI-2, TSN)
- John Friesz, Idaho (GNS)
- Dee Dowis, Air Force (GNS)
- Ty Detmer, BYU (CFHOF) (GNS)

=== Running backs ===
- Anthony Thompson, Indiana (CFHOF) (AFCA, AP-1, FWAA, UPI-1, WCFF, FN, GNS, NEA-1, SH, TSN)
- Emmitt Smith, Florida (CFHOF) (AFCA, AP-1, FWAA, UPI-1, WCFF, FN, GNS, NEA-2, SH, TSN)
- Blair Thomas, Penn State (AP-2, UPI-2, WCFF, FN, GNS, NEA-1)
- Johnny Bailey, Texas A & I (FWAA, GNS)
- Chuck Weatherspoon, Houston (TSN)
- James Gray, Texas Tech (AP-2, UPI-2)
- Siran Stacy, Alabama (GNS, NEA-2)
- Blaise Bryant, Iowa State (AP-3, GNS)
- Mike Pringle, Cal State, Fullerton (AP-3, GNS)
- Harold Green, South Carolina (GNS)
- Aaron Craver, Fresno State (GNS)
- Ivory Lee Brown, Arkansas-Pine Bluff (GNS)
- Darrell Thompson, Minnesota (GNS)

=== Wide receivers ===
- Clarkston Hines, Duke (CFHOF) (AFCA, AP-1, FWAA, UPI-1, WCFF, FN, GNS, NEA-1, SH)
- Terance Mathis, New Mexico (AFCA, AP-1, FWAA, UPI-1, GNS, SH, TSN)
- Manny Hazard, Houston (AP-1, UPI-2, GNS, NEA-2)
- Rob Moore, Syracuse (AP-2, GNS, TSN)
- Dan Bitson, Tulsa (AP-2, GNS)
- Wesley Carroll, Miami (Fla) (AP-2)
- Reggie Rembert, West Virginia (AP-3, GNS)
- Richard Buchanan, Northwestern (AP-3, GNS)
- Andre Riley, Washington (GNS)
- Shannon Sharpe, Savannah State (GNS)
- Greg McMurtry, Michigan (NEA-2)

=== Tight ends ===
- Mike Busch, Iowa State (AFCA, UPI-1, WCFF, SH)
- Chris Smith, BYU (AP-3 [receiver], TSN)
- Charles Arbuckle, UCLA (UPI-2)
- Mike Jones, Texas A&M (NEA-1)
- Eric Green, Liberty (GNS)
- Derek Brown, Notre Dame (GNS)
- Jackie Harris, Louisiana-Monroe (GNS)
- Derrick Walker, Michigan (NEA-2)

=== Offensive tackles ===
- Jim Mabry, Arkansas (AFCA [offensive line], AP-1, UPI-1 [line], WCFF, FN, SH)
- Mohammed Elewonibi, BYU (AP-3, FWAA [offensive line], UPI-1 [line], GNS [off. guard], NEA-1 [off. guard])
- Bob Kula, Michigan State (AP-1, AFCA [line], UPI-2)
- Doug Glaser, Nebraska (AP-2, UPI-2 [line], WCFF, GNS, NEA-2)
- Stacy Long, Clemson (AP-3, TSN)
- Charles Odiorne, Texas Tech (AP-3, TSN)
- Chris Port, Duke (AP-2, FWAA [line], UPI-2 [line])
- Mike Pfiefer, Kentucky (FN, NEA-1)
- Ed Cunningham, Texas (NEA-1)
- Richmond Webb, Texas A&M (GNS)
- Roman Matusz, Pittsburgh (GNS)
- Glenn Parker, Arizona (GNS)
- Greg Skrepenak, Michigan (NEA-2)

=== Offensive guards ===
- Eric Still, Tennessee (AFCA [line], AP-1, FWAA [line], UPI-1 [line], WCFF, GNS, NEA-2, SH [off. tackle], TSN)
- Joe Garten, Colorado (AFCA [line], AP-1, UPI-1 [line], FWAA [line], NEA-1, SH, TSN)
- Ed King, Auburn (AP-2, UPI-2 [line], WCFF, FN, GNS, SH)
- Mark Tucker, USC (FN, GNS)
- Roy Brown, Virginia (AP-2)
- Dean Dingman, Michigan (AP-3)
- Dave Szott, Penn State (GNS)
- Tim Grunhard, Notre Dame (NEA-2)

=== Centers ===
- Jake Young, Nebraska (AFCA, AP-3, UPI-1 [line], WCFF, NEA-2, SH)
- Michael Tanks, Florida State (AP-1, FWAA [offensive line], UPI-2 [line])
- Bern Brostek, Washington (AP-2, GNS, NEA-1, TSN)
- Frank Cornish, UCLA (FN)
- John Flannery, Syracuse (GNS)
- Tony Mayberry, Wake Forest (GNS)
- Dean Caliguire, Pittsburgh (GNS)

== Full selections - defense ==
=== Defensive ends ===
- Greg Mark, Miami (Fla) (AFCA [defensive line], AP-1 [defensive line], UPI-1 [line], GNS, NEA-2 [line], SH [line], TSN)
- Craig Veasey, Houston (TSN)
- Ray Savage, Virginia (AFCA [defensive line])
- Arthur Walker, Colorado (AP-3 [defensive line])
- Oliver Barnett, Kentucky (AP-3 [defensive line], GNS)

=== Defensive tackles ===
- Chris Zorich, Notre Dame (CFHOF) (AP-1 [defensive line], FWAA [defensive line], UPI-1 [line], WCFF [line], FN, GNS [nose tackle], NEA-2 [line], SH [line], TSN [nose tackle])
- Tim Ryan, USC (AP-1 [defensive line], FWAA [defensive line], UPI-1 [line], WCFF [line], FN, NEA-2 [line], SH [line])
- Marc Spindler, Pittsburgh (AP-2 [defensive line], UPI-2 [line], GNS, TSN)
- Cortez Kennedy, Miami (Fla.) (AP-2 [defensive line], UPI-2 [line], GNS, NEA-1 [line], TSN)
- Jeff Alm, Notre Dame (AP-2, GNS)
- Ray Agnew, North Carolina State (AP-3 [defensive line])
- Russell Maryland, Miami (Fla) (AP-3 [defensive line], GNS)
- Eric Hayes, Florida State (GNS)
- Travis Davis, Michigan State (GNS)
- Ted Washington, Louisville (GNS)

=== Nose guards ===
- Moe Gardner, Illinois (AFCA [defensive line], AP-1 [defensive line], FWAA [defensive line], UPI-1 [line], WCFF [line], FN, GNS [nose tackle], NEA-1 [line], SH [line])
- Odell Haggins, Florida State (AFCA [defensive line], AP-2 [defensive line], UPI-2 [line], WCFF [line], GNS [nose tackle], NEA-1 [line])

=== Linebackers ===
- Alfred Williams, Colorado (AFCA [defensive line], AP-2, FWAA, UPI-1, FN, GNS, NEA-1)
- Percy Snow, Michigan State (AFCA, AP-1, FWAA, UPI-1, WCFF, FN, GNS, NEA-1, SH, TSN [inside linebacker])
- Keith McCants, Alabama (AFCA, AP-1, FWAA, UPI-1, WCFF, FN, GNS, NEA-1, SH, TSN [inside linebacker])
- James Francis, Baylor (AFCA, AP-1, UPI-2, FN, GNS, NEA-1, TSN [special teams])
- Kanavis McGhee, Colorado (UPI-2, WCFF, NEA-2, SH)
- Andre Collins, Penn State (AP-2, FWAA, UPI-2, GNS, NEA-2)
- Junior Seau, USC (AP-2, GNS, NEA-2, TSN [outside linebacker])
- Craig Ogletree, Auburn (TSN [outside linebacker])
- Ned Bolcar, Notre Dame (UPI-2)
- Ron Cox, Fresno State (AP-3, GNS)
- Bob Davis, BYU (AP-3)
- Terry Wooden, Syracuse (AP-3, NEA-2)
- Tony Bennett, Ole Miss (GNS)
- Darion Conner, Jackson State (GNS)

=== Defensive backs ===
- Todd Lyght, Notre Dame (AFCA, AP-1, FWAA, UPI-1, WCFF, FN, GNS [cornerback], NEA-1, SH, TSN)
- Mark Carrier, USC (AFCA, AP-1, FWAA, UPI-1, WCFF, FN, GNS [safety], NEA-1, SH, TSN)
- Tripp Welborne, Michigan (AFCA, AP-1, FWAA, UPI-1, WCFF, FN, GNS [safety], NEA-1, SH, TSN)
- LeRoy Butler, Florida State (AP-1, UPI-1, WCFF, NEA-2, SH)
- Chris Oldham, Oregon (AP-2, FWAA, UPI-2, GNS [cornerback])
- Harlon Barnett, Michigan State (TSN, AP-3)
- John Mangum, Alabama (AP-2, FN)
- Reggie Cooper, Nebraska (AP-2, NEA-1)
- Ben Smith, Georgia (AP-2, UPI-2, NEA-2)
- Walter Briggs, Hawaii (UPI-2)
- Richard Fain, Florida (UPI-2)
- Ken Swilling, Georgia Tech (AP-3, GNS [safety], NEA-2)
- James Williams, Fresno State (AP-3, GNS [cornerback])
- Adrian Jones, Missouri (AP-3)
- Mickey Washington, Texas A&M (GNS [cornerback])
- Alonzo Hampton, Pittsburgh (GNS [cornerback])
- Pat Terrell, Notre Dame (GNS [safety])
- Jesse Campbell, North Carolina State (GNS [safety])
- Nathan LaDuke, Arizona State (NEA-2)

== Full selections - special teams ==
=== Placekickers ===
- Jason Hanson, Washington State (AFCA, AP-1, FWAA, UPI-1, WCFF, FN, GNS, NEA-1, SH, TSN)
- Philip Doyle, Alabama (AP-2, UPI-2, NEA-2)
- Chris Gardocki, Clemson (AP-3, GNS [combination])
- David Browndyke, LSU (GNS)

=== Punters ===
- Tom Rouen, Colorado (AP-1, FWAA, UPI-1, WCFF, GNS, NEA-1, SH)
- Robbie Keen, California (AFCA, UPI-2)
- Kirk Maggio, UCLA (AP-3, NEA-2, TSN)
- Shawn McCarthy, Purdue (AP-2, FN)
- Sean Fleming, Wyoming (GNS)

=== Return specialists ===
- Raghib Ismail, Notre Dame (AP-1, FWAA [kick returner], UPI-2 [wide receiver], FN, GNS [wide receiver], NEA-1 [wide receiver], TSN)
- Mike Bellamy, Illinois (AP-2)
- Ron Gray, Air Force (AP-3)

== Key ==
- **Bold** – Consensus All-American
- CFHOF - Inducted into the College Football Hall of Fame
- -1 – First-team selection
- -2 – Second-team selection
- -3 – Third-team selection

=== Official selectors ===
- AFCA – selected by American Football Coaches Association, also known as the "Kodak All-America Team"
- AP – Associated Press
- FWAA – Football Writers Association of America
- UPI – United Press International
- WCFF – Walter Camp Football Foundation

=== Other selectors ===
- FN – Football News
- GNS - Gannett News Service
- NEA – Newspaper Enterprise Association in conjunction with World Almanac
- SH – Scripps Howard
- TSN – The Sporting News

== See also ==
- 1989 All-Atlantic Coast Conference football team
- 1989 All-Big Eight Conference football team
- 1989 All-Big Ten Conference football team
- 1989 All-Pacific-10 Conference football team
- 1989 All-SEC football team
