= Tim Jackson (American football) =

American football player (born 1965)

No. 32, 40, 5
- Position: Safety

Personal information
- Born: November 7, 1965 (age 60); Dallas, Texas, U.S.
- Listed height: 5 ft 11 in (1.80 m)
- Listed weight: 192 lb (87 kg)

Career information
- High school: Skyline (Dallas)
- College: Nebraska
- NFL draft: 1989: 9th round, 224th overall pick

Career history
- Dallas Cowboys (1989); San Diego Chargers (1990)*; Barcelona Dragons (1991); Hamilton Tiger-Cats (1991–1993); Toronto Argonauts (1994)
- * Offseason or practice squad member only

Awards and highlights
- First-team All-Big Eight (1988)

Career NFL statistics
- Games played: 1
- Stats at Pro Football Reference

Timothy Gerrard Jackson (born November 7, 1965) is an American former professional football player who was a safety in the Canadian Football League (CFL) for the Hamilton Tiger-Cats and Toronto Argonauts. He also was a member of the Dallas Cowboys in the National Football League (NFL). He played college football for the Nebraska Cornhuskers.

== Early life ==
Jackson attended Skyline High School, where he practiced football and track. He was limited with multiple injuries as a senior.

He accepted a football scholarship from Kansas State University. He transferred to Coffeyville Junior College after his freshman season, where he received All-conference honors. He transferred to the University of Nebraska–Lincoln after his sophomore season.

As a junior, he was named the starter at free safety in the fifth game against the University of Kansas. He posted 34 tackles (2 for loss) and one pass defensed.

As a senior, he registered 43 tackles (one for loss), 4 interceptions (tied for the team lead and tied for fifth in the conference), 5 passes defensed (led the team), one sack, 3 forced fumbles (tied for the team lead) and one fumble recovery. He was a part of a defense that ranked sixth in the nation in pass defense (134.8 yards) and seventh in total defense (262.8 yards). He had 2 interceptions against Arizona State University.

== Professional career ==
Jackson was selected by the Dallas Cowboys in the ninth round (224th overall) of the 1989 NFL draft. He was waived on October 10.

On February 21, 1990, he signed as a free agent with the San Diego Chargers. He was released on August 6.

In 1991, he played in the inaugural season of the World League of American Football. He was a starting cornerback for the Barcelona Dragons.

On June 12, 1991, he signed with the Hamilton Tiger-Cats of the Canadian Football League. He had 56 tackles, 3 interceptions, 10 special teams tackles and 2 fumble recoveries (including one for a touchdown). In 1992, he collected 49 tackles and 2 fumble recoveries. In 1993, he tallied 46 tackles and 2 interceptions. On July 4, 1994, he was placed on the injured reserve list.

On July 26, 1994, he was signed by the Toronto Argonauts of the Canadian Football League. He was activated on September 1.
