= 1989 All-Big Eight Conference football team =

American all-star college football team

The 1989 All-Big Eight Conference football team consists of American football players chosen by various organizations for All-Big Eight Conference teams for the 1989 NCAA Division I-A football season. The selectors for the 1989 season included the Associated Press (AP).

== Offensive selections ==
=== Quarterbacks ===
- Darian Hagan, Colorado (AP-1)
- Gerry Gdowski, Nebraska (AP-2)

=== Running backs ===
- Blaise Bryant, Iowa State (AP-1)
- Ken Clark, Nebraska (AP-1)
- J. J. Flannigan, Colorado (AP-2)
- Tony Sands, Kansas (AP-2)

=== Tight ends ===
- Mike Busch, Iowa State (AP-1)
- John Baker, Kansas (AP-2)

=== Wide receivers ===
- Michael Smith, Kansas State (AP-1)
- Quinton Smith, Kansas (AP-1)
- Curtis Mayfield, Oklahoma State (AP-2)
- Jeff Campbell, Colorado (AP-2)

=== Centers ===
- Jake Young, Nebraska (AP-1)
- Mike Wise, Oklahoma (AP-2)

=== Offensive linemen ===
- Doug Glaser, Nebraska (AP-1)
- Mark Vander Poel, Colorado (AP-1)
- Darrin Muilenburg, Colorado (AP-1)
- Joe Garten, Colorado (AP-1)
- Mark Van Keirsbilck, Oklahoma (AP-2)
- Keith Sims, Iowa State (AP-2)
- Chad Faulkner, Kansas State (AP-2)
- Mike Sawatzky, Oklahoma (AP-2)

== Defensive selections ==
=== Defensive ends ===
- Alfred Williams, Colorado (AP-1)
- Kanavis McGhee, Colorado (AP-1)
- Mike Croel, Nebraska (AP-2)
- Chris Wilson, Oklahoma (AP-2)

=== Defensive lineman ===
- Arthur Walker, Colorado (AP-1)
- Scott Evans, Oklahoma (AP-1)
- Kent Wells, Nebraska (AP-1)
- Dante Williams, Oklahoma (AP-2)
- Joel Steed, Colorado (AP-2)
- Stacey Satterwhite, Oklahoma State (AP-2)

=== Linebackers ===
- Jeff Mills, Nebraska (AP-1)
- Sim Drain, Oklahoma State (AP-1)
- Frank Blevins, Oklahoma (AP-2)
- Darren MacDonald, Missouri (AP-2)
- Michael Jones, Colorado (AP-2)

=== Defensive backs ===
- Adrian Jones, Missouri (AP-1)
- Reggie Cooper, Nebraska (AP-1)
- Marcus Robertson, Iowa State (AP-1)
- Bruce Pickens, Nebraska (AP-1)
- Rod Smith, Oklahoma State (AP-2)
- Jason Belser, Oklahoma (AP-2)
- Bruce Young, Colorado (AP-2)

== Special teams ==
=== Place-kicker ===
- Cary Blanchard, Oklahoma State (AP-1)
- Ken Culbertson, Colorado (AP-2)

=== Punter ===
- Tom Rouen, Colorado (AP-1)
- B. J. Lohsen, Kansas (AP-2)

== Key ==
AP = Associated Press

== See also ==
- 1989 College Football All-America Team
