= Carl Bax =

American football player (born 1966)

No. 75, 67
- Position: Guard

Personal information
- Born: January 5, 1966 (age 60); St. Charles, Missouri, U.S.
- Listed height: 6 ft 4 in (1.93 m)
- Listed weight: 290 lb (132 kg)

Career information
- High school: St. Charles
- College: Missouri
- NFL draft: 1989: 8th round, 200th overall pick

Career history
- Tampa Bay Buccaneers (1989–1990); Cleveland Browns (1992)*; Birmingham Fire (1992)
- * Offseason or practice squad member only

Awards and highlights
- Second-team All-Big Eight (1988)

Career NFL statistics
- Games played: 15
- Games started: 10
- Stats at Pro Football Reference

Carl William Bax (born January 5, 1966) is an American former professional football player who was an offensive lineman. for the Tampa Bay Buccaneers of the National Football League (NFL). He played college football for the Missouri Tigers and was selected by the Buccaneers in the eighth round of the 1989 NFL draft. He was suspended for the first three games of his second season for trafficking steroids.

During his senior year at the University of Missouri, Bax was diagnosed with stomach cancer. He underwent surgery to remove a tumor in August 1988, and returned for his senior season.
