= Gene Williams (American football) =

American football player (born 1968)

No. 61, 62, 69
- Positions: Guard, tackle

Personal information
- Born: October 14, 1968 (age 58); Blair, Nebraska, U.S.
- Listed height: 6 ft 2 in (1.88 m)
- Listed weight: 310 lb (141 kg)

Career information
- High school: Creighton Prep (Omaha, Nebraska)
- College: Iowa State
- NFL draft: 1991: 5th round, 121st overall pick

Career history
- Miami Dolphins (1991–1992); Cleveland Browns (1993–1994); Atlanta Falcons (1995–1999)

Awards and highlights
- First-team All-Big Eight (1990)

Career NFL statistics
- Games played: 114
- Games started: 65
- Fumble recoveries: 3
- Stats at Pro Football Reference

Gene Williams (né Eugene Williams; born October 14, 1968) is an American former professional football player who was a guard for nine seasons in the National Football League (NFL) from 1991 to 1999. He played college football for the Iowa State Cyclones and was selected 121st overall by the Miami Dolphins in the fifth round of the 1991 NFL draft. He started in Super Bowl XXXIII for the Atlanta Falcons.

Williams played high school football at Creighton Preparatory School in Omaha, Nebraska. His team went undefeated and won the Class A state title his senior year.
