= Ed Cunningham (executive) =

American lawyer and CEO

Profile
- Positions: Offensive tackle, defensive tackle

Personal information
- Listed height: 6 ft 8 in (2.03 m)
- Listed weight: 293 lb (133 kg)

Career information
- High school: Sanford-Fritch High School
- College: Texas Longhorns (1987-87, 1989)

Awards and highlights
- All-American (1989); Texas Longhorn MVP - 1989; Astro-Bluebonnet Bowl Champion - 1987

Chet Edward "Ed" Cunningham is a former All-American football player, lawyer and CEO who ran for the Senate in Texas as a Democrat in 2002 and became active in government afterwards. He was a member of President Barack Obama's National Finance Committee, the Presidential Advisory Committee (Technology), the U.S. Foreign Affairs Budget Project Advisory Committee, the American Academy of Diplomacy (Co-Director of International Negotiations Program), and the Democratic National Committee National Advisory Board. He was CEO of Clear Channel Communications International, China; AEG, Asia; and the U.S. Renewable Energy Group.

== Biography ==
=== Early life ===
Cunningham grew up in a Fritch, Texas, a town with a population of fewer than 1,000 people and played football and basketball at Sanford-Fritch High School where he was an honor student. His father was the superintendent of schools. In basketball he averaged 31 points and 17 rebounds a game. He was recruited as both a lineman in football by Texas and other football powers, and as a power forward in basketball by schools such as Houston and DePaul. After his senior year, he was named to the Orlando Sentinel's All South High School Team.

=== College ===
Cunningham played football for the University of Texas football team from 1985-1987 and 1989.

In his freshman year, he was a defensive tackle. He played in 4 games recording 11 tackles, a tackle for loss, a pass deflection and a QB hit. The team went 8-4 and went to the 1985 Bluebonnet Bowl which it lost to Air Force.

Before his sophomore season, when he was expected to be a starter, he volunteered to switch to the offensive side. That team upset #15 SMU, but lost to 3 ranked teams and finished 5-6.

In his junior year he helped the Longhorns go 7-5 and win the 1987 Astro-Bluebonnet Bowl. In the mid-October game against Arkansas he injured his knee, which needed arthroscopic surgery and caused him to miss several games that season.

Prior to the 1988 season he was named to the pre-season All-SWC team despite having already been declared out for the season following reconstructive knee surgery.

For his senior year, in 1989, he was a team captain of a team that pulled off back-to-back upsets of #15 Oklahoma and #7 Arknasas and rose to #22 in the rankings but dropped 4 of their last 5 games and finised a disappointing 5-6. Cunningham was named a 1st team All-American by the Newspaper Enterprise Association; second team all-SWC and won the George “Hook” McCullough Award as the team's MVP.

After his senior year, he played in the 1990 Hula Bowl.

=== Pro football ===
Undrafted due to his knee injuries, Cunningham had many offers and signed with the New York Giants of the NFL. He was waived at the end of training camp due to a foot injury. The next year he went to minicamp with the Cleveland Browns, but he was not invited to training camp.

=== Career ===
Cunningham attended Texas Tech University School of Law, and became a partner and Director for the Global Media, Sports and Entertainment Practice at the Coudert Brothers law firm. It was the first and, during Cunningham’s tenure, the largest international law firm in Asia (more than 1,000 attorneys). In addition to representing many of the world's largest or most notable companies, Cunningham was an adviser and international counsel for Asian municipalities, provinces, and national government entities and officials.

In 2001, he was running AllProTraining.com, an internet company that allowed users to ask sports teams' trainers how to exercise more efficiently.

Cunningham was the Asia CEO for Clear Channel Communications (Entertainment Division), a Fortune 500 Company. Cunningham worked with government leaders and companies to create China's earliest joint ventures in the politically sensitive cultural, sports, entertainment, and media industries.

As AEG's Chief Executive Officer, Managing Director and Special Advisor for Asia (2005-April 2009), Cunningham was responsible for the region's development. That included building AEG's global platform through agreements to develop media, culture, sports, and entertainment in the region's major cities, including the 2008 Beijing Olympic Basketball Arena and the 2010 World Expo Arena.

Cunningham founded and organized the China Earthquake Tent Relief Project to supply shelter for the earthquake victims in China's Sichuan Province, which provided the first foreign-supplied tents to the area.

== Later Life ==
Cunningham went to Texas Tech Law school from 1991-94 and graduated magna cum laude. In 1998, he became a law partner in global entertainment and media.

In 2001, Cunningham announced he was running for the Democratic nomination for the U.S. Senate seat then held by Phil Gramm, who was retiring. After raising more than $200,000 for his bid, far less than he aimed for, he suspended his campaign 6 months after it started and endorsed Ron Kirk. By the time he dropped out, people had already started voting in the primary, and Cunningham managed to garner 2.3% of the vote and come in 5th.

In 2002 he became CEO of Clear Channel in China and in 2005 of AIG, Asia.

In 2009 he returned to Austin and became CEO of U.S. Renewable Energy Group. In 2021 he became a consultant.

During that time he was on several government advisory boards.

=== Relationships ===
Cunningham was formerly married to Tara Coronado, a lawyer and former Peace Corps volunteer, with whom he has four children. in 2013 he was arrested for allegedly assaulting Coronado. In 2016 he signed a Deferred Prosecution Agreement (DPA) that dismissed the charges.

He has been married to Aimee Cunningham since 2014.
