= Cary Blanchard =

American football player (1968–2016)

- Blanchard with the New York Jets, c. 1993

No. 10, 14, 19, 15
- Position: Placekicker

Personal information
- Born: November 5, 1968; Fort Worth, Texas, U.S.
- Died: September 6, 2016 (aged 47); Mabank, Texas, U.S.
- Listed height: 6 ft 2 in (1.88 m)
- Listed weight: 223 lb (101 kg)

Career information
- High school: L. D. Bell (Hurst, Texas)
- College: Oklahoma State
- NFL draft: 1991: undrafted

Career history
- Dallas Cowboys (1991)*; Sacramento Surge (1992); New Orleans Saints (1992); New York Jets (1992–1993); Minnesota Vikings (1994)*; New Orleans Saints (1995)*; Indianapolis Colts (1995–1997); Washington Redskins (1998); New York Giants (1999); Arizona Cardinals (2000–2001)
- * Offseason or practice squad member only

Awards and highlights
- First-team All-Pro (1996); Pro Bowl (1996); PFW Golden Toe Award (1996); World Bowl champion (1992); 2× First-team All-Big Eight (1988, 1989); Second-team All-Big Eight (1990)

Career NFL statistics
- Field goals made: 165
- Field goals attempts: 214
- Field goal %: 77.1
- Longest field goal: 54
- Stats at Pro Football Reference

Robert Cary Blanchard (November 5, 1968 – September 6, 2016) was an American professional football player who was a placekicker in the National Football League (NFL) for the New Orleans Saints, New York Jets, Indianapolis Colts, Washington Redskins, New York Giants and Arizona Cardinals. He played college football for the Oklahoma State Cowboys.

== Early life ==
Blanchard attended L. D. Bell High School in Hurst, Texas. As a senior, he earned all-state honors at kicker. He graduated in 1987.

== College career ==
Blanchard accepted a football scholarship from Oklahoma State University. As a sophomore, he made 11-of-12 field goals and set a school, conference and NCAA season-record by hitting all 67 of his extra point attempts.

As a senior, he made 14-of-19 field goal attempts, including a career-long tying 52-yarder against the University of Northern Iowa. He received his third All-Big Eight first-team selection and his second honorable-mention All-American selection.

He finished his college career with 331 points (56 field goals and 163 extra points), ranking in the top five in school history in scoring, extra points made, extra points attempted, field goals made and field goals attempted. In addition to kicking, he had a career average of 39.6 yards per punt.

== Professional career ==
=== Dallas Cowboys ===
Blanchard was signed as an undrafted free agent by the Dallas Cowboys after the 1991 NFL draft on April 29. He was released before the start of the season on August 5, after not being able to pass incumbent Ken Willis on the depth chart.

=== Sacramento Surge ===
In 1992, he played with the Sacramento Surge of the World Football League. He made 5-of-8 (62.5%) field goals attempts and 17-of-17 (100%) extra point attempts.

=== New Orleans Saints (first stint) ===
On July 7, 1992, he was signed as a free agent by the New Orleans Saints. He was released before the start of the season and signed to the practice squad. He was waived after the fourth week of the season on September 26.

=== New York Jets ===
On September 29, 1992, he was claimed off waivers by the New York Jets, to replace Jason Staurovsky. He went 16-for-22 in field goals attempts. In 1993, he made 17-of-26 in field goals attempts. He was released on July 7, 1994.

=== Minnesota Vikings ===
On July 9, 1994, he signed as a free agent with the Minnesota Vikings. He could not beat out incumbent Fuad Reveiz and was released on August 28.

=== New Orleans Saints (second stint) ===
On April 19, 1995, he signed with the New Orleans Saints. On August 27, he was released after losing the preseason kicking competition against Chip Lohmiller.

=== Indianapolis Colts ===
On October 4, 1995, he was signed four games into the season to replace a struggling Mike Cofer. His most memorable kick came in that year's playoff run, making a third-quarter, 30-yard field goal on the road against the Kansas City Chiefs, to seal the Colts' 10–7 victory.

In 1996, he had his best season, receiving All-Pro and Pro Bowl honors. On August 30, 1998, he was released after being beaten out by Mike Vanderjagt. He left as the franchise's all-time leader in field goal percentage (82.9%).

=== Washington Redskins ===
On September 22, 1998, he signed with the Washington Redskins. Although he was the team's third kicker in three weeks, he was able to keep his job for the rest of the season. In 1999, he was beaten out by Brett Conway and was released on August 30, 1999.

=== New York Giants ===
On October 20, 1999, he was signed by the New York Giants 6 games into the season, to replace an injured Brad Daluiso. He made 18-of-21 (85.7%) field goal attempts. He wasn't re-signed after the season.

=== Arizona Cardinals ===
On February 13, 2000, he signed with the Arizona Cardinals to replace Chris Jacke. He posted 16-of-23 (69.6%) field goal attempts and 18-of-19 (94.7%) extra point attempts. On September 2, 2001, he was placed on the injured reserve list with a torn tendon in his right big toe. He was replaced with rookie Bill Gramatica. He wasn't re-signed after the season.

Blanchard finished his career with 165-of-214 field goal attempts (77.1%), and 188-of-190 extra point attempts (99%).

== Personal life ==
After football, he was the operations supervisor for the Deer Creek School districts in Edmond, Oklahoma. He died in Mabank, Texas, on September 6, 2016, at the age of 47 from a heart attack.
