= Chris Wilson (American football coach) =

American football coach (born 1969)

Personal information
- Born: January 8, 1969 (age 57); Carnegie, Oklahoma, U.S.

Career information
- High school: Richardson (TX)
- College: Oklahoma
- NFL draft: 1992: 12th round, 331st overall pick

Career history
- Indiana State (1993) Graduate assistant; Indiana State (1994) Linebackers coach; Northern Illinois (1995) Outside linebackers coach; Northeastern State (1996) Defensive line coach; Indiana State (1997) Outside linebackers coach; Illinois State (1998–1999) Defensive line coach; Colorado (2000–2004) Defensive line coach; Oklahoma (2005–2006) Defensive ends coach; Oklahoma (2007–2009) Defensive ends coach & special teams coordinator; Mississippi State (2010) Co-defensive coordinator & defensive line coach; Mississippi State (2011–2012) Defensive coordinator & defensive line coach; Georgia (2013) Defensive line coach; USC (2014–2015) Defensive line coach; Philadelphia Eagles (2016–2018) Defensive line coach; Arizona Cardinals (2019) Defensive assistant; Colorado (2020) Defensive line coach; Colorado (2021–2022) Defensive coordinator & defensive line coach; Houston Gamblers (2023) Defensive coordinator; Houston Roughnecks (2024–2025) Defensive coordinator & linebackers coach; Arkansas (2025) Interim Defensive Coordinator & assistant defensive line coach

Awards and highlights
- Super Bowl champion (LII); 3× Second-team All-Big Eight (1989, 1990, 1991)

Chris Wilson (born January 8, 1969) is an American football coach who was the interim defensive coordinator for the Arkansas Razorbacks. Wilson received a Super Bowl ring when he served as a coach for the Philadelphia Eagles, who defeated the New England Patriots in Super Bowl LII. Before that, he spent two years with the University of Southern California as the defensive line coach. He has also held collegiate coaching positions with the University of Oklahoma, Indiana State, NE Oklahoma A&M, Illinois State, the University of Colorado, Mississippi State, the University of Georgia, and USC. In addition he has done internships with the Dallas Cowboys and Arizona Cardinals. He was part of the Eagles' coaching staff that won Super Bowl LII.

Wilson attended the University of Oklahoma from 1987 to 1991; he obtained a bachelor's degree in communications and lettered in football all four years. He achieved 303 career tackles, was named team captain twice, and in 1992 was a 12th round (331st overall) NFL Draft selection by the Chicago Bears.

Wilson was born in Richardson, Texas. He attended Richardson High School, where he played football and ran track. He is married to Tina who also attended OU. They have a son, Caleb, and a daughter Colby Wilson.
