= Blaise Bryant =

American gridiron football player (born 1969)

Profile
- Position: Running back

Personal information
- Born: November 23, 1969 (age 56); Huntington Beach, California, U.S.
- Listed height: 5 ft 11 in (1.80 m)
- Listed weight: 203 lb (92 kg)

Career information
- College: Iowa State
- NFL draft: 1991: 6th round

Career history
- 1991: New York Jets*
- 1993: Saskatchewan Roughriders
- 1993–1996: Winnipeg Blue Bombers
- * Offseason or practice squad member only

Awards and highlights
- Third-team All-American (1989); First-team All-Big Eight (1989); Second-team All-Big Eight (1990)

Blaise X. Bryant (born November 23, 1969) is an American former professional football player who was a running back in the Canadian Football League (CFL) with the Saskatchewan Roughriders and Winnipeg Blue Bombers.

He played college football for the Iowa State Cyclones and is one of the college's all-time leading rushers. A sixth-round pick in 1991 by the NFL's New York Jets, Bryant enjoyed great success playing for the CFL's Winnipeg Blue Bombers from where he has several playing records, notably a single game rushing record for most yards (246) against Hamilton, September 17, 1994 which stood for almost 15 years til it was broken August 21, 2009.

== Career regular season rushing statistics ==
Year	Team	GP	Rush	Yards	Y/R	Lg	TD
1993	Saskatchewan Roughriders	2	24	100	4.2	25	0
1993	Winnipeg Blue Bombers	8	62	313	5.0	68	1
1994	Winnipeg Blue Bombers	16	232	1289	5.6	65	10
1995	Winnipeg Blue Bombers	14	159	664	4.2	25	7
1996	Winnipeg Blue Bombers	7	69	278	4.0	32	1
	CFL Totals		546	2622	4.8	68	19
