= Marcus Robertson =

American football player and coach (born 1969)

Profile
- Title: Defensive backs coach

Personal information
- Born: October 2, 1969 (age 57); Pasadena, California, U.S.
- Listed height: 5 ft 11 in (1.80 m)
- Listed weight: 198 lb (90 kg)

Career information
- Position: Defensive back (No. 31)
- High school: John Muir (Pasadena)
- College: Iowa State
- NFL draft: 1991: 4th round, 102nd overall pick

Career history

Playing
- Houston/Tennessee Oilers/Titans (1991–2000); Seattle Seahawks (2001–2002)

Coaching
- Tennessee Titans (2007–2008) Assistant secondary coach; Tennessee Titans (2009–2011) Secondary coach; Detroit Lions (2012) Assistant secondary coach; Detroit Lions (2013) Secondary coach; Oakland Raiders (2014) Assistant defensive backs coach; Oakland Raiders (2015–2016) Defensive backs coach; Denver Broncos (2017–2018) Defensive backs coach; Arizona Cardinals (2019–2022) Defensive backs coach; New Orleans Saints (2023–2024) Defensive backs coach; Las Vegas Raiders (2025) Defensive backs coach

Awards and highlights
- As player: First-team All-Pro (1993); First-team All-Big Eight (1989); Second-team All-Big Eight (1990)

Career NFL statistics
- Tackles: 800
- Interceptions: 24
- Sacks: 1.5
- Stats at Pro Football Reference
- Coaching profile at Pro Football Reference

Marcus Aaron Robertson (born October 2, 1969) is an American football coach and former safety who is the defensive backs coach for the Las Vegas Raiders of the National Football League (NFL). He previously served as an assistant coach for the Arizona Cardinals, Denver Broncos, Oakland Raiders, Detroit Lions and Tennessee Titans.

Robertson has spent the last 28 seasons in the NFL as a player, administrator and coach, and has coached defensive backs in the NFL for the last 12 seasons.

== Playing career ==
=== College ===
Robertson played college football at Iowa State. During his four seasons as a cornerback at Iowa State, Robertson totaled 257 tackles, six interceptions and nine forced fumbles. He was inducted into the Iowa State Athletic Hall of Fame in 2009.

=== NFL ===
Pre-draft measurables
Height	Weight	Arm length	Hand span	Bench press
5 ft 11 1/4 in (1.81 m)	197 lb (89 kg)	30 in (0.76 m)	9 1/8 in (0.23 m)	12 reps

Robertson was drafted by the Houston Oilers in the fourth round of the 1991 NFL draft. Robertson was named an NFL All-Pro in 1993 and played in 162 regular-season games (144 starts). He finished his career with 24 interceptions and 72 passes defensed.

== Administrative career ==
Robertson spent four seasons (2003–2006) as the Titans’ director of player development. Robertson and his staff won the Winston and Shell Award in 2006 for their innovation and commitment to player development in the NFL.

== Coaching career ==
=== Tennessee Titans ===
Robertson began his coaching career as the assistant secondary coach for the Tennessee Titans from 2007 to 2008, and eventually the head secondary coach from 2009 to 2011. Robertson helped the team rank second in the NFL in average passing yards per completion (10.6) during that span.

=== Detroit Lions ===
On February 13, 2012, Robertson was hired by the Detroit Lions as their assistant secondary coach. Robertson had previously coached with former Lions head coach Jim Schwartz and former Lions defensive coordinator Gunther Cunningham when both were assistants with the Titans. Robertson was not retained by the Lions following the firing of Schwartz and the team's failure to make the playoffs in 2013.

=== Oakland Raiders ===
On February 3, 2014, Robertson was hired by the Oakland Raiders as their assistant defensive backs coach under defensive backs coach Joe Woods and head coach Dennis Allen. On January 21, 2015, Robertson was promoted to defensive backs coach under new head coach Jack Del Rio, during the off-season Robertson earned the endorsement of veteran player Charles Woodson. The Raiders totaled the eighth-most interceptions (30) and the sixth-most passes defensed (163) in the NFL during Robertson's two seasons leading Oakland's defensive backs.

=== Denver Broncos ===
On January 16, 2017, Robertson was hired by the Denver Broncos as their defensive backs coach under head coach Vance Joseph, replacing former defensive backs coach Joe Woods, who was promoted to defensive coordinator.

=== Arizona Cardinals ===
On February 6, 2019, Robertson was hired by the Arizona Cardinals as their defensive backs coach under defensive coordinator Vance Joseph and head coach Kliff Kingsbury.

=== New Orleans Saints ===
On February 15, 2023, Robertson was hired by the New Orleans Saints as the team's defensive backs coach.

=== Las Vegas Raiders ===
On February 11, 2025, the Las Vegas Raiders hired Robertson to serve as their defensive backs coach.
