= Bruce Pickens =

American football player (born 1968)

No. 39, 38, 20
- Position: Cornerback

Personal information
- Born: May 9, 1968 (age 58); Kansas City, Missouri, U.S.
- Listed height: 5 ft 11 in (1.80 m)
- Listed weight: 190 lb (86 kg)

Career information
- High school: Westport (Kansas City)
- College: Nebraska
- NFL draft: 1991: 1st round, 3rd overall pick

Career history
- Atlanta Falcons (1991–1993); Green Bay Packers (1993); Kansas City Chiefs (1993); Oakland Raiders (1995)

Awards and highlights
- First-team All-Big Eight (1989); Second-team All-Big Eight (1990)

Career NFL statistics
- Tackles: 88
- Interceptions: 2
- Fumble recoveries: 1
- Stats at Pro Football Reference

Bruce Pickens (born May 9, 1968) is an American former professional football player who was a cornerback for four seasons in the National Football League (NFL) for the Atlanta Falcons, Green Bay Packers, Kansas City Chiefs, and Oakland Raiders. He played college football for the Nebraska Cornhuskers and was selected in the first round with the third overall pick in the 1991 NFL draft.

A New York Times pre-draft assessment of the 5-10, 192 lb. cornerback that ran a 4.48: "A junior-college transfer who hasn't been exposed to top passing offenses and is somewhat raw in overall development but has the best physical skill of the DBs this year. Very athletic."
