= Reggie Cooper =

American football player (born 1968)

No. 93
- Position: Linebacker

Personal information
- Born: July 11, 1968 (age 58); Bogalusa, Louisiana, U.S.
- Listed height: 6 ft 2 in (1.88 m)
- Listed weight: 214 lb (97 kg)

Career information
- High school: Slidell (Slidell, Louisiana)
- College: Nebraska
- NFL draft: 1991: undrafted

Career history
- Dallas Cowboys (1991); Chicago Bears (1993)*; Shreveport Pirates (1994)*
- * Offseason or practice squad member only

Awards and highlights
- Second-team All-American (1989); 2× First-team All-Big Eight (1989, 1990); Second-team All-Big Eight (1988)

Career NFL statistics
- Games played: 2
- Stats at Pro Football Reference

Reginald John Cooper (born July 11, 1968) is an American former professional football player who was a linebacker for the Dallas Cowboys of the National Football League (NFL). He played college football for the Nebraska Cornhuskers.

== Early life ==
Cooper attended Slidell High School, where he practiced football, basketball and track. In football, he played tight end, defensive end, strong safety and was a return specialist.

As a senior, he contributed to his team reaching the state championship game. He received All-state, Prep All-American and Louisiana Defensive Player of the Year honors. His football jersey (No. 2) was retired by the school.

He was a McDonald's All-American in basketball. He practiced the high jump in track.

== College career ==
Cooper accepted a football scholarship from the University of Nebraska–Lincoln. As a freshman, he played mainly on special teams. As a sophomore, he was named the starter at strong safety. As a junior, he had one interception.

As a senior, he finished third on the team in total tackles, tied for the team lead in passes deflected and became the first player in school history to lead the Big Eight Conference in interceptions (4). He earned Big Eight Defensive Player of the Week honors after making 8 tackles, one interception and returning a blocked punt 17 yards for his first touchdown against the University of Missouri. He was a part of a defensive unit that led the Big Eight Conference and ranked seventh in the nation in yards allowed.

Cooper was a two-time Jim Thorpe Award nominee, while leading the team's secondary in tackles in his last 3 years. He finished his college career with 195 tackles (school record for defensive backs), 16 tackles for loss (school record for defensive backs), 5 interceptions and 17 pass deflections. His teams led the Big Eight Conference in pass defense during the 1988 and 1990 seasons.

In 2013, he was inducted into the Nebraska Football Hall of Fame.

== Professional career ==
=== Dallas Cowboys ===
Cooper was signed as an undrafted free agent by the Dallas Cowboys after the 1991 NFL draft, to play linebacker. He was waived on August 20 and later signed to the practice squad. On November 1, he was promoted to the active roster, after spending the first 8 games of the season on the practice squad. He strained his left quadriceps in the tenth game against the Houston Oilers and was placed on the injured reserve list on November 11. He was activated on December 6, but did not see any game action in the final three games of the season.

He was released on August 31, 1992.

=== Chicago Bears ===
On March 16, 1993, he was signed as a free agent by the Chicago Bears, reuniting with head coach Dave Wannstedt, who was his defensive coordinator with the Cowboys. He was released on August 24.

=== Shreveport Pirates (CFL) ===
In 1994, he signed with the Shreveport Pirates of the Canadian Football League. He was suspended on June 26. He was released on July 21.
