= Jake Young (American football) =

American football player (1968–2002)

No. 68
- Position: Center

Personal information
- Born: March 22, 1968; El Paso, Texas, U.S.
- Died: October 12, 2002 (aged 34); Kuta, Bali, Indonesia
- Listed height: 6 ft 4 in (1.93 m)
- Listed weight: 270 lb (122 kg)

Career information
- High school: Lee (Midland, Texas)
- College: Nebraska (1986–1989)

Awards and highlights
- Consensus All-American (1989); First-team All-American (1988); 2× First-team All-Big Eight (1988, 1989); Second-team All-Big Eight (1987)

Jacob Cardwell Young III (March 22, 1968 – October 12, 2002) was an American college football player who was a center for the Nebraska Cornhuskers. At the University of Nebraska–Lincoln, he was a first-team All-American in 1988 and a consensus All-American in 1989.

== Early life ==
Jacob Cardwell Young III was born on March 22, 1968, in El Paso, Texas. He played high school football at Midland Lee High School in Midland, Texas and earned all-state honors as an offensive guard. As a senior in 1985, he helped Midland accrue a 10–3 record and advance to the Class 5A state quarterfinals.

== College career ==
Young was a four-year letterman for the Nebraska Cornhuskers of the University of Nebraska–Lincoln from 1986 to 1989. He started his college career as an offensive guard in 1986, spending time on both the freshman and varsity teams that season. He was the first true freshman Cornhusker offensive lineman to earn a letter since freshman eligibility was reinstated in 1972. Young moved to center in 1987 and became the first true sophomore to start on Nebraska's offensive line since Rik Bonness in 1973. He was named second-team All-Big 8. Young missed the first game of the 1988 season due to a knee strain. He then played in, but did not start, the next game before starting every game the rest of the season. For the 1988 season, he earned first-team All-Big 8, GTE/CoSIDA Academic All-American, and Associated Press (AP) and Coaches first-team All-American recognition. As a senior in 1989, Young garnered consensus All-American, first-team All-Big 8, and GTE/CoSIDA Academic All-American recognition. He was also one of six recipients of the NCAA's Today’s Top Six Award, given to the best six student-athletes in the country. He majored in finance at Nebraska and graduated with a bachelor's degree in 1990. Young also later earned a Juris Doctor from Nebraska in 1994. He was inducted into the Nebraska Football Hall of Fame in 2000.

== Professional career ==
Young went undrafted in the 1990 NFL draft. He had a tryout with the Detroit Lions in July 1990 but was not signed. NFL scouts reportedly considered Young too slow to play in the NFL. He had a 40-yard dash of 5.4 seconds.

== Personal life ==
Young worked at the law firms of Bryan Cave, Sonnenschein Nath & Rosenthal, and Clifford Chance. He was also a member of The Missouri Bar and the New York State Bar Association.

While working for Clifford Chance in Hong Kong, Young played rugby for the Hong Kong Football Club (HKFC). He was in Indonesia in 2002 to compete in a tournament for HKFC when he was killed in a nightclub bombing. Nebraska's Jake Young Memorial Scholarship was named in his honor.
