= Eric Bieniemy =

American football player and coach (born 1969)

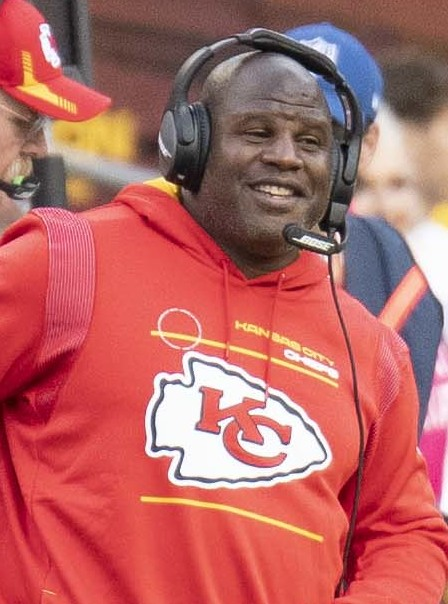
- Bieniemy with the Kansas City Chiefs in 2021

Kansas City Chiefs
- Title: Offensive coordinator

Personal information
- Born: August 15, 1969 (age 57); New Orleans, Louisiana, U.S.
- Listed height: 5 ft 7 in (1.70 m)
- Listed weight: 205 lb (93 kg)

Career information
- Position: Running back (No. 32, 21, 33)
- High school: Bishop Amat (La Puente, California)
- College: Colorado (1987–1990)
- NFL draft: 1991: 2nd round, 38th overall pick

Career history

Playing
- San Diego Chargers (1991–1994); Cincinnati Bengals (1995–1998); Philadelphia Eagles (1999)

Coaching
- Thomas Jefferson HS (CO) (2000) Assistant coach; Colorado (2001–2002) Running backs coach; UCLA (2003–2005); Running backs coach (2003–2004); Running backs coach & recruiting coordinator (2005); Minnesota Vikings (2006–2010); Running backs coach (2006–2009); Assistant head coach & running backs coach (2010); Colorado (2011–2012) Offensive coordinator; Kansas City Chiefs (2013–2022); Running backs coach (2013–2017); Offensive coordinator (2018–2022); Washington Commanders (2023) Assistant head coach & offensive coordinator; UCLA (2024) Assistant head coach & offensive coordinator; Chicago Bears (2025) Running backs coach; Kansas City Chiefs (2026–present) Offensive coordinator

Awards and highlights
- As a player: AP national champion (1990); Unanimous All-American (1990); Big Eight Offensive Player of the Year (1990); First-team All-Big Eight (1988, 1990); CU Athletic Hall of Fame (2010); As a coach: 2× Super Bowl champion (LIV, LVII)

Career NFL statistics
- Rushing attempts: 387
- Rushing yards: 1,589
- Rushing touchdowns: 11
- Stats at Pro Football Reference
- Coaching profile at Pro Football Reference

Eric M. Bieniemy Jr. (bee-EN-uh-me; born August 15, 1969) is an American professional football coach and former running back who is the offensive coordinator for the Kansas City Chiefs of the National Football League (NFL). He played college football for the Colorado Buffaloes and is their all-time leader in rushing yards (3,940) and touchdowns (42). Bieniemy was also named a unanimous All-American and finished third in Heisman Trophy voting during their 1990 national championship season.

Bieniemy was selected by the San Diego Chargers in the second round of the 1991 NFL draft, later playing for the Cincinnati Bengals and Philadelphia Eagles primarily as a special teamer before returning to Colorado in the early 2000s to finish his degree. Following that, he was hired as the school's running backs coach and later coached for the UCLA Bruins and the NFL's Minnesota Vikings, helping develop players such as Maurice Jones-Drew and Adrian Peterson.

Bieniemy was Colorado's offensive coordinator for two seasons prior to joining the Kansas City Chiefs as running backs coach in 2013. He was credited in the development of Jamaal Charles and Kareem Hunt, with the latter leading the NFL in rushing yards as a rookie in 2017. He was promoted to offensive coordinator under head coach Andy Reid in 2018, winning Super Bowl LIV and Super Bowl LVII with the Chiefs. Bieniemy also served as the Washington Commanders assistant head coach and offensive coordinator in 2023 and the offensive coordinator for the UCLA Bruins in 2024 before joining the Bears as their running backs coach in 2025. In 2026, the Chiefs brought back Bieniemy to be their offensive coordinator again under head coach Andy Reid.

== Early life ==
Bieniemy was born on August 15, 1969, in New Orleans, Louisiana. He later moved with his family to Hollywood, California, in 1979 before settling in West Covina, California, the following year. He later attended Bishop Amat Memorial High School in La Puente, California, lettering in football and track and field. Bieniemy earned second-team All-America football honors as a senior in 1986 after rushing for 2,002 yards and 30 touchdowns.

== College career ==
Bieniemy enrolled at the University of Colorado Boulder in 1987, choosing them over the University of Southern California explaining: "I had been used to living in a big city; I had never been in a small city. It was pretty, it was the first time in snow, it was just something different. I wanted to be a part of it." He was an immediate starter for the Colorado Buffaloes as a freshman and was named to the 1988 All-Big Eight Conference football team as a sophomore after rushing 219 times for 1,243 yards and 10 touchdowns.

He played in the Fifth Down Game against Missouri as a senior in 1990, in which two consecutive rushes by him were counted as second down due to an officiating error. By the end of the 1990 season, he was named the Big Eight Conference's Offensive Player of the Year while finishing third in Heisman Trophy voting after rushing for 1,628 with 17 touchdowns en route to a national championship. Bieniemy is Colorado's all-time leader in rushing (3,940 yards), rushing touchdowns (42), and all-purpose yards (4,351). He was inducted into the school's Athletic Hall of Fame in 2010.

== Professional career ==
Pre-draft measurables
Height	Weight	Arm length	Hand span	40-yard dash	10-yard split	20-yard split	Vertical jump	Broad jump	Bench press
5 ft 7 1/8 in (1.70 m)	208 lb (94 kg)	29 1/2 in (0.75 m)	9 1/4 in (0.23 m)	4.50 s	1.62 s	2.65 s	36.0 in (0.91 m)	9 ft 1 in (2.77 m)	19 reps

Bieniemy was selected by the San Diego Chargers in the second round (39th overall) of the 1991 NFL draft. In 1994 with the San Diego Chargers, he appeared in Super Bowl XXIX, where he recorded a 33-yard reception—the longest for his team in the game. Bieniemy played for the Cincinnati Bengals from 1995 to 1998, then concluded his career before retiring after one season with the Philadelphia Eagles in 1999. He finished with 1,589 rushing yards, 1,223 receiving yards, 276 return yards, 1,621 kickoff return yards, and 12 total touchdowns (11 rushing, 1 kickoff return).

== Career statistics ==
=== NFL ===
Legend
	Led the league
**Bold**	Career high

==== Regular season ====
Year	Team	Games		Rushing					Receiving					Kick returns					Punt returns				
Year	Team	GP	GS	Att	Yds	Avg	Lng	TD	Rec	Yds	Avg	Lng	TD	Ret	Yds	Avg	Lng	TD	Ret	Yds	Avg	Lng	TD
1991	SD	15	0	3	17	5.7	15	0	0	–	–	–	–	0	–	–	–	–	0	–	–	–	–
1992	SD	15	0	74	264	3.6	21	**3**	5	49	9.8	25	0	15	257	17.1	30	0	**30**	**229**	**7.6**	**21**	0
1993	SD	**16**	0	33	135	4.1	12	1	1	0	0.0	0	0	7	110	15.7	18	0	0	–	–	–	–
1994	SD	**16**	0	73	295	4.0	**36**	0	5	48	9.6	25	0	0	–	–	–	–	0	–	–	–	–
1995	CIN	**16**	**1**	**98**	**381**	3.9	27	**3**	**43**	**424**	9.9	33	0	8	168	21.0	34	0	7	47	6.7	10	0
1996	CIN	**16**	0	56	269	4.8	33	2	32	272	8.5	**42**	0	0	–	–	–	–	0	–	–	–	–
1997	CIN	**16**	0	21	97	4.6	20	1	31	249	8.0	21	0	**34**	**789**	**23.2**	**102**	**1**	0	–	–	–	–
1998	CIN	**16**	0	17	56	3.3	9	0	27	153	5.7	15	0	5	87	17.4	22	0	0	–	–	–	–
1999	PHI	**16**	0	12	75	**6.3**	28	1	2	28	**14.0**	27	0	10	210	21.0	30	0	0	–	–	–	–
Career		142	1	387	1,589	4.1	36	11	146	1,223	8.4	42	0	79	1,621	20.5	102	1	37	276	7.5	21	0

==== Postseason ====
Year	Team	Games		Rushing					Receiving					Kick returns				
Year	Team	GP	GS	Att	Yds	Avg	Lng	TD	Rec	Yds	Avg	Lng	TD	Ret	Yds	Avg	Lng	TD
1992	SD	2	0	**17**	**64**	3.8	14	0	**1**	-4	-4.0	-4	0	**1**	**14**	**14.0**	**14**	0
1994	SD	**3**	0	5	36	**7.2**	**17**	0	**1**	**33**	**33.0**	**33**	0	**1**	13	13.0	13	0
Career		5	0	22	100	4.5	17	0	2	29	14.5	33	0	2	27	13.5	14	0

=== College ===
College statistics
Season	GP	Rushing				Receiving			
Season	GP	Att	Yds	Avg	TD	Rec	Yds	Avg	TD
1987	11	104	508	4.9	5	10	186	18.6	1
1988	10	219	1,243	5.7	10	2	20	10	0
1989	8	88	561	6.4	9	2	15	7.5	0
1990	11	288	1,628	5.7	17	13	159	12.2	0
Career	40	699	3,940	5.6	41	27	380	14.1	1

== Coaching career ==
=== Early college jobs ===
Bieniemy was an assistant coach at Denver's Thomas Jefferson High School in 2000. He re-enrolled at Colorado in 2001 to finish his degree in sociology and was the running backs coach for the Buffaloes from 2001 to 2002 and was UCLA running back coach from 2003 to 2005, as well as the team's recruiting coordinator in 2005.

=== Minnesota Vikings ===
Following UCLA's 2005 Sun Bowl victory, Bieniemy accepted a position as running backs coach for the Minnesota Vikings in the NFL. During his time with the Vikings, Adrian Peterson led the NFC in rushing with 1,341 yards in 2007 and also in 2008 with 1,760 yards, which was also top in the NFL. Bieniemy was given the title of assistant head coach in 2010.

=== Return to Colorado ===
On December 2, 2010, Bieniemy returned to Colorado as offensive coordinator under head coach Jon Embree. Bieniemy was offered the head coach position in 2020 at Colorado but he declined.

=== Kansas City Chiefs ===
In 2013, Kansas City Chiefs head coach Andy Reid hired Bieniemy to be the running backs coach. In 2018, Reid promoted Bieniemy to offensive coordinator to succeed Matt Nagy who had been hired as the head coach of the Chicago Bears. In Bieniemy's first season as the Chiefs offensive coordinator, the Chiefs were first in the NFL in yards per game and points scored. The Chiefs scored the third-most points in a season in NFL history with 565. Additionally, Chiefs quarterback Patrick Mahomes became the second quarterback in NFL history, along with Peyton Manning, to throw for 5,000 yards and 50 touchdowns in a season. The Chiefs reached the 2018 AFC Championship Game where they lost to the New England Patriots. In 2019, Bieniemy won his first Super Bowl when the Chiefs defeated the San Francisco 49ers 31–20 in Super Bowl LIV. In 2022, Bieniemy won his second Super Bowl with the Chiefs after defeating the Philadelphia Eagles 38–35 in Super Bowl LVII.

=== Washington Commanders ===
On February 17, 2023, Bieniemy signed a two-year contract with the Washington Commanders to be Ron Rivera's assistant head coach and offensive coordinator. He was given full playcalling duties, something he did not share under Chiefs head coach Andy Reid. At the conclusion of his first season with Washington, the Commanders finished with a 4–13 record. Bieniemy's offense ranked 21st in average yards per game. Bieniemy was not retained by newly hired head coach Dan Quinn following the season.

=== UCLA (second stint) ===
In February 2024, Bieniemy was named the associate head coach and offensive coordinator at UCLA. He was dismissed on December 5, 2024, after UCLA finished their season 5–7, ranking 117th in yards per game and 126th in points scored per game.

=== Chicago Bears ===
On February 20, 2025, the Chicago Bears hired Bieniemy as their running backs coach on the staff of new head coach Ben Johnson. His coaching was considered a large contribution to the performances of D'Andre Swift, who achieved a career season high of 1,087 rushing yards and nine rushing touchdowns, and rookie Kyle Monangai, who recorded 783 rushing yards and five rushing touchdowns.

=== Kansas City Chiefs (second stint) ===
Following the Chiefs' decision to move on from Nagy at the end of his contract, Bieniemy signed a multi-year contract to return to the team as their offensive coordinator on January 23, 2026.

== Personal life ==
Bieniemy and his wife have two sons. He is a member of Omega Psi Phi fraternity. His nephew, Jamal, played basketball at the University of Oklahoma and University of Texas El Paso.

On July 26, 2026, Bieniemy's wife Mia was reportedly shot at their home in Ashburn, Virginia; their son Elijah was arrested and charged with three felonies: use of a firearm in the commission of a felony, malicious wounding and discharging a firearm within a building. Mia was hospitalized with multiple gunshot wounds. Elijah was held at a Loudoun County detention center without bond. Mia Bieniemy was later reported to be in stable condition.

== Legal issues ==
Bieniemy was arrested along with Colorado teammate Kanavis McGhee following a bar fight in February 1988. McGhee said the dispute arose after Bieniemy alleged that he had been called a "nigger" by a bar patron. He pleaded no contest to disorderly conduct and was sentenced to community service. Bieniemy also received discipline from head coach Bill McCartney.

On July 4, 1990, Bieniemy pleaded no contest to interfering with a firefighter who had been performing his duties to extinguish a fire in Bieniemy's mother's garage. Bieniemy received an eight-month suspended sentence and was suspended for one game. Bieniemy was instructed to do 40 hours of community service and attend an eight-hour firefighting training session. An assistant city attorney said that Bieniemy failed to attend the firefighting training session as stipulated in the plea agreement, but Bieniemy asserted the session was optional.

On September 27, 1993, Bieniemy was arrested for allegedly harassing a female parking attendant. According to the police report, while with his friends, Bieniemy put his hand on the attendant's neck, startling her. She told police that Bieniemy and his friends took off their pants and began urinating nearby. Bieniemy was also named in an outstanding warrant on a charge of driving with a suspended license. As a result of this incident, Bieniemy was banned from the University of Colorado Boulder campus for a year.

In April 2001, Bieniemy was arrested for driving under the influence and was docked a month's pay.
