= Jeff Mills (linebacker) =

American football player (born 1968)

No. 52
- Position: Linebacker

Personal information
- Born: October 8, 1968 (age 58); Montclair, New Jersey, U.S.
- Listed height: 6 ft 3 in (1.91 m)
- Listed weight: 244 lb (111 kg)

Career information
- High school: Montclair
- College: Nebraska (1986–1989)
- NFL draft: 1990: 3rd round, 57th overall pick

Career history
- San Diego Chargers (1990); Denver Broncos (1990–1993); New York Giants (1994)

Awards and highlights
- First-team All-Big Eight (1989)

Career NFL statistics
- Sacks: 5
- Fumble recoveries: 2
- Stats at Pro Football Reference

Jeff Jonathan Mills (born October 8, 1968) is an American former professional football player who was a linebacker for four seasons in the National Football League (NFL) with the San Diego Chargers and Denver Broncos. He was selected by the Chargers in the third round of the 1990 NFL draft after playing college football at the University of Nebraska–Lincoln. Mills was also a member of the New York Giants.

== Early life and college ==
Jeff Jonathan Mills was born on October 8, 1968, in Montclair, New Jersey. He attended Montclair High School in Montclair.

Mills was a member of the Nebraska Cornhuskers of the University of Nebraska–Lincoln from 1986 to 1989 and a three-year letterman from 1987 to 1989. He earned first-team All-Big Eight honors his senior year in 1989.

== Professional career ==
Mills was selected by the San Diego Chargers in the third round, with the 57th overall pick, of the 1990 NFL draft. He officially signed with the team on June 28, 1990. He played in five games for the Chargers during the 1990 season before being placed on injured reserve on October 27 after pulling his hamstring. On November 19, the Chargers suspended Mills for a week for "conduct detrimental to the team". He was waived on December 20, 1990.

Mills was claimed off waivers by the Denver Broncos on December 21, 1990. He played in two games for the Broncos during the 1990 season. The next year, he was placed on injured reserve on October 19, 1991, and later activated on November 16, 1991. Overall, Mills appeared in 12 games, starting three, in 1991 and recorded three sacks. He also played in one playoff game that year. He appeared in 14 games in 1992, totaling two sacks and two fumble recoveries. Mills played in 13 games during the 1993 seaaon and became a free agent afterwards.

Mills signed with the New York Giants on October 5, 1994, but did not appear in any games before being released on November 11, 1994.
