= Eric Still =

American football player (born 1967)

No. 58
- Position: Offensive lineman

Personal information
- Born: June 28, 1967 (age 59); Kansas City, Missouri, U.S.
- Listed height: 6 ft 3 in (1.91 m)
- Listed weight: 279 lb (127 kg)

Career information
- High school: Germantown (Germantown, Tennessee)
- College: Tennessee (1986–1989)
- NFL draft: 1990: 4th round, 99th overall pick

Career history
- Houston Oilers (1990)*; New England Patriots (1990)*; Frankfurt Galaxy (1991–1992)
- * Offseason or practice squad member only

Awards and highlights
- Unanimous All-American (1989); Jacobs Blocking Trophy (1989); First-team All-SEC (1989); Second-team All-SEC (1988)

Eric Johnson Still (born June 28, 1967) is an American former college football offensive lineman who played for the Tennessee Volunteers of the University of Tennessee. He was a consensus All-American in 1989. He was selected by the Houston Oilers in the fourth round of the 1990 NFL draft. Still played two seasons with the Frankfurt Galaxy of the World League of American Football.

== Early life ==
Eric Johnson Still was born on June 28, 1967, in Kansas City, Missouri. He attended Germantown High School in Germantown, Tennessee. He earned all-state honors his junior year as a defensive tackle and all-state honors as an offensive tackle his senior year. He also garnered Parade and USA Today All-American recognition. Still was named Southsports Magazine's offensive player of the year. He was a state champion in the discus throw in high school as well.

== College career ==
Still was a four-year letterman for the Tennessee Volunteers of the University of Tennessee from 1986 to 1989. He redshirted in 1985. He played in seven games in 1986 and was named Academic All-Southeastern Conference (SEC). He appeared in ten games in 1987 before dislocating his toe, earning Academic All-SEC honors for the second consecutive season. Still played in 11 games during the 1988 season, garnering Associated Press (AP) second-team All-SEC and Coaches first-team All-SEC accolades. He was also named Academic All-District 3 and Academic All-SEC. He started 12 games as a senior team captain in 1989, helping the Volunteers set a school record with 408.5 yards per game. Still was a consensus All-American in 1989 and also won the Jacobs Blocking Trophy that year. He was also named first-team All-SEC by both the AP and United Press International, and Academic All-SEC for the fourth straight year. Still played in the Senior Bowl with an ankle injury after his senior year. He majored in transportation at Tennessee.

== Professional career ==
Still was selected by the Houston Oilers in the fourth round, with the 99th overall pick, of the 1990 NFL draft. On July 23, 1990, it was reported that he had officially signed with the team.

In late August 1990, Still was traded to the New England Patriots for an undisclosed conditional draft pick. He was waived by the Patriots on September 3, 1990.

Still started all ten games for the Frankfurt Galaxy of the World League of American Football in 1991. The Galaxy finished the season with a 7–3 record. He was also a member of the Galaxy in 1992.
