= Mark Vander Poel =

American football player (born 1968)

No. 72
- Position: Offensive tackle

Personal information
- Born: March 5, 1968 (age 58); Upland, California, U.S.
- Listed height: 6 ft 7 in (2.01 m)
- Listed weight: 303 lb (137 kg)

Career information
- High school: Chino (CA)
- College: Colorado
- NFL draft: 1991: 4th round, 96th overall pick

Career history
- Indianapolis Colts (1991–1993); Arizona Cardinals (1994); San Diego Chargers (1995)*
- * Offseason or practice squad member only

Awards and highlights
- National champion (1990); 2× First-team All-Big Eight (1989, 1990); Second-team All-Big Eight (1988)

Career NFL statistics
- Games played: 23
- Stats at Pro Football Reference

John Mark Vander Poel (born March 5, 1968) is an American former professional football player who was an offensive tackle in the National Football League (NFL). He played college football for the Colorado Buffaloes and in the NFL for the Indianapolis Colts.

== College career ==
Vander Poel played college football for the Buffaloes at the University of Colorado Boulder from 1987 to 1990. On his last season with Colorado, he made the All-Big Eight team.

== Professional career ==
Vander Poel was selected by the Indianapolis Colts in the fourth round of the 1991 NFL draft. He made his first start with the Colts in October 1991. After being released by the Colts in 1993, he signed with the Arizona Cardinals where he would play before retiring after the 1994 season.
