= 1988 All-Big Eight Conference football team =

American all-star college football team

The 1988 All-Big Eight Conference football team consists of American football players chosen by various organizations for All-Big Eight Conference teams for the 1988 NCAA Division I-A football season. The selectors for the 1988 season included the Associated Press (AP).

== Offensive selections ==
=== Quarterbacks ===
- Steve Taylor, Nebraska (AP-1)
- Mike Gundy, Oklahoma State (AP-2)

=== Running backs ===
- Barry Sanders, Oklahoma State (AP-1)
- Eric Bieniemy, Colorado (AP-1)
- Ken Clark, Nebraska (AP-1)
- Joe Henderson, Iowa State (AP-2)
- Mike Gaddis, Oklahoma (AP-2)

=== Tight ends ===
- Todd Millikan, Nebraska (AP-1)
- Mike Busch, Iowa State (AP-2)

=== Wide receivers ===
- Hart Lee Dykes, Oklahoma State (AP-1)
- Willie Vaughn, Kansas (AP-2)
- Greg Washington, Kansas State (AP-2)

=== Centers ===
- Jake Young, Nebraska (AP-1)
- Erik Norgard, Colorado (AP-2)

=== Offensive tackles ===
- Bob Sledge, Nebraska (AP-1)
- Byron Woodard, Oklahoma State (AP-1)
- Terron Manning, Oklahoma (AP-2)
- Mark Vander Poel, Colorado (AP-2)

=== Offensive guards ===
- Anthony Phillips, Oklahoma (AP-1)
- Chris Stanley, Oklahoma State (AP-1)
- Andy Keeler, Nebraska (AP-2)
- Carl Bax, Missouri (AP-2)

== Defensive selections ==
=== Defensive ends ===
- Broderick Thomas, Nebraska (AP-1)
- Kanavis McGhee, Colorado (AP-1)
- Steve Vandergrift, Missouri (AP-2)
- Alfred Williams, Colorado (AP-2)

=== Defensive lineman ===
- Scott Evans, Oklahoma (AP-1)
- Willie Griffin, Nebraska (AP-1)
- Curtice Williams, Oklahoma (AP-2)
- Tony Woods, Oklahoma (AP-2)
- Arthur Walker, Colorado (AP-2)

=== Nose guards ===
- Lawrence Pete, Nebraska (AP-1)

=== Linebackers ===
- Mike Shane, Iowa State (AP-1)
- LeRoy Etienne, Nebraska (AP-1)
- Curtis Moore, Kansas (AP-2)
- Darren MacDonald, Missouri (AP-2)

=== Defensive backs ===
- Adrian Jones, Missouri (AP-1)
- Charles Fryar, Nebraska (AP-1)
- Tim Jackson, Nebraska (AP-1)
- Scott Garl, Oklahoma (AP-1)
- Peda Samuel, Kansas (AP-2)
- Reggie Cooper, Nebraska (AP-2)
- Ray Carreathers, Iowa State (AP-2)
- Jeff Dole, Iowa State (AP-2)

== Special teams ==
=== Place-kicker ===
- Cary Blanchard, Oklahoma State (AP-1)
- Jeff Shudak, Iowa State (AP-2)

=== Punter ===
- Keith English, Colorado (AP-1)
- Todd Thomsen, Oklahoma (AP-2)

== Key ==
AP = Associated Press

== See also ==
- 1988 College Football All-America Team
