= 1990 All-Big Eight Conference football team =

American all-star college football team

The 1990 All-Big Eight Conference football team consists of American football players chosen by various organizations for All-Big Eight Conference teams for the 1990 NCAA Division I-A football season. The selectors for the 1990 season included the Associated Press (AP).

== Offensive selections ==
=== Quarterbacks ===
- Darian Hagan, Colorado (AP-1)
- Carl Straw, Kansas State (AP-2)

=== Running backs ===
- Eric Bieniemy, Colorado (AP-1)
- Gerald Hudson, Oklahoma State (AP-1)
- Leodis Flowers, Nebraska (AP-2)
- Blaise Bryant, Iowa State (AP-2)

=== Tight ends ===
- Johnny Mitchell, Nebraska (AP-1)
- Tim Bruton, Missouri (AP-2)

=== Wide receivers ===
- Mike Pritchard, Colorado (AP-1)
- Linzy Collins, Missouri (AP-1)
- Frank Hernandez, Kansas State (AP-2)
- Michael Smith, Kansas State (AP-2)

=== Centers ===
- Jay Leeuwenburg, Colorado (AP-1)
- Chip Budde, Kansas (AP-2)

=== Offensive linemen ===
- Joe Garten, Colorado (AP-1)
- Mark Vander Poel, Colorado (AP-1)
- Tom Punt, Nebraska (AP-1)
- Gene Williams, Iowa State (AP-1)
- Will Shields, Nebraska (AP-2)
- Mike Sawatzky, Oklahoma (AP-2)
- Jim Wanek, Nebraska (AP-2)
- Chris Perez, Kansas (AP-2)

== Defensive selections ==
=== Defensive ends ===
- Kanavis McGhee, Colorado (AP-1)
- Alfred Williams, Colorado (AP-1)
- Jason Gildon, Oklahoma State (AP-2)
- James Goode, Oklahoma (AP-2)

=== Defensive lineman ===
- Kenny Walker, Nebraska (AP-1)
- Joel Steed, Colorado (AP-1)
- Scott Evans, Oklahoma (AP-1)
- Garry Howe, Colorado (AP-1)
- Stacey Satterwhite, Oklahoma State (AP-2)
- Gilbert Brown, Kansas (AP-2)
- Pat Engelbert, Nebraska (AP-2)

=== Linebackers ===
- Mike Croel, Nebraska (AP-1)
- Pat Tyrance, Nebraska (AP-1)
- Chris Wilson, Oklahoma (AP-2)
- Brooks Barta, Kansas State (AP-2)
- Joe Bowden, Oklahoma (AP-2)

=== Defensive backs ===
- Reggie Cooper, Nebraska (AP-1)
- Harry Colon, Missouri (AP-1)
- Tim James, Colorado (AP-1)
- Mike Clark, Oklahoma State (AP-2)
- Bruce Pickens, Nebraska (AP-2)
- Marcus Robertson, Iowa State (AP-2)

== Special teams ==
=== Place-kicker ===
- Jeff Shudak, Iowa State (AP-1)
- Dan Eichoff, Kansas (AP-2)

=== Punter ===
- Dan Eichoff, Kansas (AP-1)
- Cary Blanchard, Oklahoma State (AP-2)

== Key ==
AP = Associated Press

== See also ==
- 1990 College Football All-America Team
