= Ken Clark (running back) =

American football player (1966–2013)

No. 32
- Position: Running back

Personal information
- Born: June 17, 1966; Evergreen, Alabama, U.S.
- Died: February 16, 2013 (aged 46); Minneapolis, Minnesota, U.S.
- Listed height: 5 ft 9 in (1.75 m)
- Listed weight: 201 lb (91 kg)

Career information
- High school: Bryan (Bellevue, Nebraska)
- College: Nebraska
- NFL draft: 1990: 8th round, 206th overall pick

Career history
- Indianapolis Colts (1990–1992)

Awards and highlights
- 2× First-team All-Big Eight (1988, 1989)

Career NFL statistics
- Rushing yards: 510
- Rushing average: 3.2
- Receptions: 43
- Receiving yards: 314
- Stats at Pro Football Reference

Kenneth R. Clark (June 17, 1966 – February 16, 2013) was an American professional football player from Evergreen, Alabama who played running back for three seasons for the Indianapolis Colts.

== College career ==
Clark was a two-time All Big-Eight running back for the Nebraska Cornhuskers from 1986 to 1989. Following a redshirt season in 1986, Clark played sporadically as a sophomore, appearing in eight games before suffering a knee strain. He rushed for over 1,000 yards in both his junior and senior seasons, and as of 2012, his three-year rushing total of 3,037 yards ranks seventh on Nebraska's all-time leaders in that category. He averaged 6.1 yards per carry for his college career. His career highlight came during his junior season in a 1988 game against Oklahoma State where he outgained eventual Heisman trophy winner Barry Sanders 256 yards to 189 and also scored three touchdowns, the first on a dazzling 73-yard run on Nebraska's first play from scrimmage.

== Professional career ==
Pre-draft measurables
Height	Weight	Arm length	Hand span	40-yard dash	10-yard split	20-yard split	20-yard shuttle	Vertical jump	Broad jump	Bench press
5 ft 9 1/8 in (1.76 m)	203 lb (92 kg)	30 in (0.76 m)	8 1/2 in (0.22 m)	4.66 s	1.61 s	2.66 s	4.27 s	34.0 in (0.86 m)	9 ft 3 in (2.82 m)	10 reps

In 1990, Clark was drafted in the eighth round by the Indianapolis Colts. He appeared in 34 games for the Colts in three seasons. In 1991, he was the only running back to play in all 16 games for the Colts.

== Death ==
Clark died on Saturday, February 16, 2013, in Minneapolis, following a massive heart attack. His cousin, Stephanie Clark of Omaha, confirmed Clark's death.
