= Mike Croel =

American football player (born 1969)

No. 88, 51, 90
- Position: Linebacker

Personal information
- Born: June 6, 1969 (age 57); Detroit, Michigan, U.S.
- Listed height: 6 ft 3 in (1.91 m)
- Listed weight: 241 lb (109 kg)

Career information
- High school: Lincoln-Sudbury (Sudbury, Massachusetts)
- College: Nebraska
- NFL draft: 1991: 1st round, 4th overall pick

Career history
- Denver Broncos (1991–1994); New York Giants (1995); Baltimore Ravens (1996); Atlanta Falcons (1997)*; Rhein Fire (1998); Seattle Seahawks (1998); Los Angeles Xtreme (2001)
- * Offseason or practice squad member only

Awards and highlights
- NFL Defensive Rookie of the Year (1991); PFWA All-Rookie Team (1991); Second-team All-American (1990); First-team All-Big Eight (1990); Second-team All-Big Eight (1989)

Career NFL statistics
- Tackles: 448
- Sacks: 24
- Interceptions: 2
- Touchdowns: 1
- Stats at Pro Football Reference

Michael Croel (born June 6, 1969) is an American former professional football player who was a linebacker in the National Football League (NFL) and XFL.

== Career ==
In a seven-year NFL career, he played for the Denver Broncos, New York Giants, Baltimore Ravens and Seattle Seahawks of the NFL and the Los Angeles Xtreme of the XFL. Croel attended Los Altos High School (Los Altos, California) and Lincoln-Sudbury Regional High School, he played college football at the University of Nebraska–Lincoln. In 2003, he was inducted in their Football Hall of fame.

Croel was selected by the Broncos in the first round of the 1991 NFL draft with the fourth overall pick. In 1991, he was chosen as the NFL Defensive Rookie of the Year and the UPI AFL-AFC Rookie of the Year award. In that same rookie year, Croel recorded ten sacks, his single-season high. In 101 career games, Croel scored one touchdown, recorded 24 sacks, two interceptions and 38 yards.
