= Tom Rouen =

American football player (born 1968)

No. 5, 16, 10, 14
- Position: Punter

Personal information
- Born: June 9, 1968 (age 58); Hinsdale, Illinois, U.S.
- Listed height: 6 ft 3 in (1.91 m)
- Listed weight: 225 lb (102 kg)

Career information
- High school: Heritage (Littleton, Colorado)
- College: Colorado
- NFL draft: 1991: undrafted

Career history
- New York Giants (1991)*; Los Angeles Rams (1992)*; Ohio Glory (1992); Denver Broncos (1993–2002); New York Giants (2002); Pittsburgh Steelers (2002); Seattle Seahawks (2003–2004); Carolina Panthers (2005)*; Seattle Seahawks (2005); San Francisco 49ers (2006)*
- * Offseason or practice squad member only

Awards and highlights
- 2× Super Bowl champion (XXXII, XXXIII); Second-team All-Pro (1994); Denver Broncos 50th Anniversary Team (2009); National champion (1990); Consensus All-American (1989); First-team All-Big Eight (1989)

Career NFL statistics
- Punts: 810
- Punting yards: 35,189
- Punting average: 43.4
- Stats at Pro Football Reference

Thomas Francis Rouen (born June 9, 1968) is an American former professional football player who was a punter in the National Football League (NFL), primarily with the Denver Broncos. He played college football for the Colorado Buffaloes, earning consensus All-American honors in 1989.

== Early life ==
Rouen attended Heritage High School in Littleton, Colorado, where he lettered in football and baseball. He was also listed on the depth chart as a tight end.

== College career ==
Rouen started his career at Colorado State University in 1987 before transferring to the University of Colorado Boulder. He led the nation as a junior with a 45.9 yards per punt average, earning a spot on the All-America team. Rouen's most famous punt came in the final minute of the 1991 Orange Bowl when Raghib Ismail returned the punt 91 yards for a touchdown. The return was called back on a clipping penalty and Colorado won the game 10-9 and a share of the 1990 National Championship.

== Professional career ==
Rouen was an undrafted free agent with the New York Giants in 1991 but was waived before the preseason. The following year, he signed with the Los Angeles Rams but again was waived before the preseason.

Rouen signed with the Ohio Glory of the World League of American Football and made the All-World League team. He then joined the Denver Broncos before the start of the 1993 NFL season and played for the Broncos for eight seasons, in the process winning Super Bowl XXXII and Super Bowl XXXIII. He appeared in every game with the Broncos. As of 2017's NFL off-season, Tom Rouen held at least 3 Broncos franchise records, including: career punts (641), punt yards (28,146), and punts in a playoff game (nine on December 31, 2000, against the Baltimore Ravens).

Rouen then had a journeyman-like 2002 season—he was waived by the Broncos, was signed and subsequently waived by the New York Giants, and was picked up by the Pittsburgh Steelers all within the course of six weeks. He finished the season with Pittsburgh before signing with the Seattle Seahawks before the 2003 NFL season. He was placed on injured reserve midway through the 2004 campaign and was later waived by Seattle. He was signed by the Carolina Panthers before the 2005 season, but they released him in favor of Jason Baker, and he was re-signed by Seattle, where he completed the 2005 season before being released.

Rouen was later signed by the 49ers to compete with Andy Lee for the starting punter job but later cut from the team and did not play in 2006.

== NFL career statistics ==
Legend
| | Won the Super Bowl |
| | Led the league |
| **Bold** | Career High |

=== Regular season ===
| Year | Team | GP | Punting | | | | |
| Year | Team | GP | Punts | Yds | Avg | Lng | Blk |
|---|---|---|---|---|---|---|---|
| 1993 | DEN | **16** | 67 | 3,017 | 45.0 | 62 | 1 |
| 1994 | DEN | **16** | 76 | 3,258 | 42.9 | 59 | 0 |
| 1995 | DEN | **16** | 52 | 2,192 | 42.2 | 61 | 1 |
| 1996 | DEN | **16** | 65 | 2,714 | 41.8 | 57 | 0 |
| 1997 | DEN | **16** | 60 | 2,598 | 43.3 | 57 | 0 |
| 1998 | DEN | **16** | 66 | 3,097 | **46.9** | **76** | 1 |
| 1999 | DEN | **16** | **84** | **3,908** | 46.5 | 65 | 0 |
| 2000 | DEN | **16** | 61 | 2,455 | 40.2 | 62 | 1 |
| 2001 | DEN | **16** | 81 | 3,668 | 45.3 | 64 | 1 |
| 2002 | DEN | 8 | 29 | 1,239 | 42.7 | 63 | **2** |
| 2002 | NYG | 2 | 8 | 333 | 41.6 | 55 | 0 |
| 2002 | PIT | 2 | 7 | 316 | 45.1 | 55 | 0 |
| 2003 | SEA | **16** | 67 | 2,762 | 41.2 | 61 | **2** |
| 2004 | SEA | 4 | 26 | 1,093 | 42.0 | 60 | 0 |
| 2005 | SEA | 12 | 61 | 2,539 | 41.6 | 62 | 0 |
| Career | | 188 | 810 | 35,189 | 43.4 | 76 | 9 |

=== Postseason ===
| Year | Team | GP | Punting | | | | |
| Year | Team | GP | Punts | Yds | Avg | Lng | Blk |
|---|---|---|---|---|---|---|---|
| 1993 | DEN | 1 | 4 | 135 | 33.8 | 45 | 0 |
| 1996 | DEN | 1 | 5 | 213 | 42.6 | 52 | 0 |
| 1997 | DEN | **4** | **17** | 619 | 36.4 | 53 | **1** |
| 1998 | DEN | 3 | 10 | 449 | 44.9 | 59 | **1** |
| 2000 | DEN | 1 | 9 | 346 | 38.4 | **62** | 0 |
| 2002 | PIT | 2 | 12 | 403 | 33.6 | 40 | 0 |
| 2003 | SEA | 1 | 6 | 225 | 37.5 | 45 | 0 |
| 2004 | SEA | 0 | Did not play due to injury | | | | |
| 2005 | SEA | 3 | 15 | **682** | **45.5** | 57 | 0 |
| Career | | 16 | 78 | 3,072 | 39.4 | 62 | 2 |

== Personal life ==
Rouen has been married to six-time Olympic gold medalist swimmer Amy Van Dyken since 2001. The couple splits their time between Arizona and Colorado.
