= Kenny Walker (American football) =

American gridiron football player (born 1967)

No. 96
- Position: Defensive lineman

Personal information
- Born: April 6, 1967 (age 59); Crane, Texas, U.S.
- Listed height: 6 ft 3 in (1.91 m)
- Listed weight: 260 lb (118 kg)

Career information
- High school: South (Denver, Colorado)
- College: Nebraska
- NFL draft: 1991: 8th round, 200th overall pick

Career history

Playing
- 1991–1992: Denver Broncos
- 1994–1995: Calgary Stampeders
- 1995–1996: Winnipeg Blue Bombers

Coaching
- 1997-2000: Iowa School for the Deaf (Defensive Line)
- 2008: Gallaudet (Defensive Line)

Awards and highlights
- First-team All-American (1990); First-team All-Big Eight (1990)
- Stats at Pro Football Reference

Kenny Wayne Walker (born April 6, 1967) is an American former professional football player who was a defensive lineman for the Denver Broncos and the first deaf player to have played in the Canadian Football League (CFL) and one of only five to have played in the National Football League (NFL). He played college football for the Nebraska Cornhuskers

== Biography ==
Walker became profoundly deaf from meningitis at the age of two, and was the third of only five players in the history of the National Football League to have some form of deafness. Walker followed Larry Brown, who played with the Washington Redskins from 1969 to 1976 and Bonnie Sloan, who was a member of the St. Louis Cardinals in 1973. Walker was subsequently followed by Flozell Adams, who played with the Dallas Cowboys and Pittsburgh Steelers from 1998 to 2010 and Derrick Coleman, a member of the Seattle Seahawks, Atlanta Falcons and Arizona Cardinals from 2012 to 2018.

Walker starred at the University of Nebraska–Lincoln. At his final home game for the Cornhuskers, the capacity crowd showed their appreciation for Walker by signing "applause" to him in unison. After playing in the Senior Bowl, the Broncos selected him in the eighth round (200th overall) of the 1991 NFL draft.

Walker emerged as a regular for the Broncos in 1991, playing in all 16 games. The following year, he started in all but one of the team's games, but his career ended after that. Following his time in the NFL, Walker played a short, three-season stint in the Canadian Football League with the Calgary Stampeders (1994-1995) and Winnipeg Blue Bombers (1995-1996), becoming the first deaf player in the history of the CFL. Additionally, Walker sued the Denver Broncos in 1995 for violating the Americans with Disabilities Act by misrepresenting his disability to other NFL teams. The outcome of the suit was not reported.

Walker published an autobiography Roar of Silence: The Kenny Walker Story in 1998, and also has a chapter dedicated to him in the book Great Deaf Americans.

In September 2010, Walker was hired as the defensive line coach at Gallaudet University, a federally-charted private university for the deaf that plays football in NCAA Division III. He would leave this position after only one season with the Gallaudet Bisons. Prior to this, Walker was a coach and counselor at the Iowa School for the Deaf.

In 2014, Walker was back in Denver, working as an assistant coach with the Highlands Ranch track team.
