= Scott Evans (American football) =

American football player (born 1968)

No. 96
- Position: Defensive end

Personal information
- Born: March 29, 1968 (age 58); Cincinnati, Ohio, U.S.
- Listed height: 6 ft 3 in (1.91 m)
- Listed weight: 261 lb (118 kg)

Career information
- High school: Edmond Memorial (Edmond, Oklahoma)
- College: Oklahoma (1987–1990)

Career history
- Phoenix Cardinals (1991); Green Bay Packers (1991)*; Atlanta Falcons (1992)*
- * Offseason or practice squad member only

Awards and highlights
- 3× First-team All-Big Eight (1988–1990)

Career statistics
- Games played: 1
- Stats at Pro Football Reference

Scott Allen Evans (born March 29, 1968) is an American former professional football defensive end who played for the Phoenix Cardinals of the National Football League (NFL). He played college football for the Oklahoma Sooners.

== Early life ==
Evans was born on March 29, 1968, in Cincinnati, Ohio. He attended Edmond Memorial High School in Edmond, Oklahoma.

== College career ==
Evans played college football for the Oklahoma Sooners from 1987 to 1990 and was a four-year letterman. He earned three consecutive first-team All-Big Eight selections from 1988 to 1990. Evans played in the 1991 Blue–Gray Football Classic and was named the defensive MVP.

== Professional career ==
=== Phoenix Cardinals ===
Evans was selected in the eighth round, with the 209th overall selection, by the Phoenix Cardinals in the 1991 NFL draft. On August 26, he was released and signed to the practice squad the following day. On October 19, Evans was elevated to the active roster and played against the Atlanta Falcons. On October 29, he was waived and re-signed to the practice squad the next day. On November 13, Evans was released by the team.

=== Green Bay Packers ===
On November 27, 1991, Evans signed to the practice squad of the Green Bay Packers. He was released before the end of the season and became a free agent.

=== Atlanta Falcons ===
On April 13, 1992, Evans signed with the Atlanta Falcons. On July 27, he was placed on the reserve/retired list.
