= Kent Wells =

American football player (born 1967)

No. 95, 73, 77
- Position: Defensive tackle

Personal information
- Born: June 25, 1967 (age 59); Lincoln, Nebraska, U.S.
- Listed height: 6 ft 4 in (1.93 m)
- Listed weight: 295 lb (134 kg)

Career information
- High school: East (Lincoln)
- College: Nebraska
- NFL draft: 1990: 6th round, 160th overall pick

Career history
- Washington Redskins (1990)*; New York Giants (1990); San Francisco 49ers (1991)*; Ohio Glory (1992); Cleveland Browns (1992)*; Cleveland Thunderbolts (1993–1994); Tampa Bay Storm (1995–1998); Iowa Barnstormers (1998–1999); Orlando Predators (1999)
- * Offseason or practice squad member only

Awards and highlights
- 2× ArenaBowl champion (1995, 1996); 2× First-team All-Arena (1995, 1996); AFL Lineman of the Year (1996); AFL All-Star (1993); First-team All-Big Eight (1989)
- Stats at Pro Football Reference
- Stats at ArenaFan.com

Kent Eugene Wells (born July 25, 1967) is an American former professional football defensive tackle who played one season with the New York Giants of the National Football League (NFL). He was selected by the Washington Redskins in the sixth round of the 1990 NFL draft after playing college football at the University of Nebraska–Lincoln. Wells was also a member of the San Francisco 49ers, Ohio Glory, Cleveland Browns, Cleveland Thunderbolts, Tampa Bay Storm, Iowa Barnstormers, and Orlando Predators.

== Early life ==
Wells attended Lincoln East High School in Lincoln, Nebraska.

== College career ==
Wells enrolled at the University of Nebraska–Lincoln in 1985 and lettered in football for the Nebraska Cornhuskers from 1987 to 1989, recording career totals of 37 solo tackles, 40 tackle assists and ten sacks. He earned First-team All-Big Eight honors in 1989. He also participated in track and field for the Cornhuskers, competing in the shot put.

== Professional career ==
Wells was selected by the Washington Redskins of the NFL with the 160th pick of the 1990 NFL draft. He was released by the Redskins on August 27, 1990.

Wells was claimed off waivers by the New York Giants on August 30, 1990 and played in six games for the team during the 1990 season. He was released by the Giants on December 3, 1990.

Wells was a member of the NFL's San Francisco 49ers during the 1991 off-season. He was released by the 49ers on August 20, 1991.

Wells played in all ten games for the Ohio Glory of the World League of American Football in 1992.

Wells was signed by the Cleveland Browns of the NFL on August 4, 1992.

Wells signed with the Cleveland Thunderbolts of the Arena Football League (AFL) on March 19, 1993 and played for the team from 1993 to 1994. He played in the 1993 AFL All-Star game. The Thunderbolts folded after the 1994 season.

Wells played for the Tampa Bay Storm of the AFL from 1995 to 1997. He earned First-team All-Arena honors in 1995 and 1996. He was also named Lineman of the Year in 1996. Wells won ArenaBowl IX and X with the Storm. He was traded to the New York CityHawks for Roosevelt Nix on June 18, 1997 but the trade was rescinded when Wells failed to pass his physical.

Wells was traded to the Iowa Barnstormers in a three team deal involving the Tampa Bay Storm and New York CityHawks in 1998 and played for the Barnstormers during the 1998 season.

Wells was traded to the Orlando Predators during the 1999 preseason and played for the team during the 1999 season.
