= Kanavis McGhee =

American football player and coach (born 1968)

No. 96, 95
- Positions: Linebacker, defensive end

Personal information
- Born: October 4, 1968 (age 58); Houston, Texas, U.S.
- Listed height: 6 ft 4 in (1.93 m)
- Listed weight: 257 lb (117 kg)

Career information
- High school: Wheatley (Houston, Texas)
- College: Colorado
- NFL draft: 1991: 2nd round, 55th overall pick

Career history

Playing
- New York Giants (1991–1993); Cincinnati Bengals (1994); Houston Oilers (1995)

Coaching
- Amsterdam Admirals (2006) Defensive assistant; Amsterdam Admirals (2007) Defensive line; Colorado (2010) Defensive line assistant

Awards and highlights
- National champion (1990); First-team All-American (1989); 3× First-team All-Big Eight (1988, 1989, 1990)

Career NFL statistics
- Tackles: 18
- Sacks: 3.0
- Stats at Pro Football Reference

Kanavis McGhee (born October 4, 1968) is an American former professional football player who was a linebacker and defensive end in the National Football League (NFL). He is a former defensive linemen coach with the Amsterdam Admirals in NFL Europa. He coached as the defensive line coach at the University of Colorado Boulder in Boulder, Colorado. He is currently the head coach and athletic coordinator at Sterling High School in Houston, Texas.

McGhee was a business student while attending the University of Colorado. He studied business with an emphasis in marketing.

McGhee attended Phillis Wheatley High School in Houston and played college football for the Colorado Buffaloes. During his career at the University of Colorado Boulder, McGhee was one of the top defenders in college football, earning him first-team All-Big Eight honors, a finalist nomination for the prestigious Dick Butkus Award and runner-up for the Rotary Lombardi Award. Both awards are given annually to top linebackers in college football.

McGhee was selected in the second round (55th overall) of the 1991 NFL draft, as defensive end by the New York Giants, where he played for three seasons until he suffered a left knee injury in August 1993 and the Giants released him in May 1994. After this he joined the Cincinnati Bengals as free agent before returning to his hometown to play with the Houston Oilers for the season of 1995.

McGhee gained coaching experience while serving as head coach of Ross Shaw Sterling High School in Houston, Texas. In 2006, he spent the season with the Amsterdam Admirals as defensive assistant, participating in the NFL Europa coaching program. In 2007 McGhee returned for a second season and tutored the Admirals' defensive linemen.

McGhee worked as a teacher at Challenge Early College High School in Houston, Texas. In 2010 he returned to Colorado as defensive line assistant under Jon Embree.

McGhee has two sons, Davyon McGhee, who played for Kansas State University, also as linebacker, and Kendall Gregory-McGhee, who played for the University of Minnesota as a defensive end.

== Agent allegations ==
In the October 18, 2010 issue of Sports Illustrated, former NFL agent Josh Luchs alleges that he gave McGhee $2,500 while trying to persuade him to hire Luchs as his agent, while he still played for the University of Colorado. Luchs said McGhee told him his mother was about to be evicted from her rental home and needed the money. According to Luchs, McGhee never paid back the money and did not return his phone calls. If true, the payment would have been considered a major violation of NCAA rules regarding player eligibility. McGhee has denied that he ever violated NCAA rules and Alfred Williams, who was present at first meeting between McGhee and Luchs, has stated that the information in the article is not true.
