= Joe Garten =

American football player (born 1968)

Joesph Walter Garten
Profile
- Position: Guard

Personal information
- Born: August 13, 1968 (age 58); Las Vegas, Nevada, U.S.
- Listed height: 6 ft 2 in (1.88 m)
- Listed weight: 286 lb (130 kg)

Career information
- High school: Valencia (Placentia, California)
- College: Colorado
- NFL draft: 1991: 6th round, 164th overall pick

Career history
- Green Bay Packers (1991–1992); Los Angeles Rams (1993) *; New Orleans Saints (1994) *; Las Vegas Posse (1994); San Antonio Texans (1995); Barcelona Dragons (1996); Frankfurt Galaxy (1997)

Awards and highlights
- National champion (1990); Unanimous All-American (1990); Consensus All-American (1989); 2× First-team All-Big Eight (1989, 1990)

Joseph W. Garten (born August 13, 1968) is an American former professional football guard in the Canadian Football League (CFL) and World League of American Football (WLAF). He played college football for the Colorado Buffaloes, where he was a two-time consensus All-American. He then played for the Las Vegas Posse and San Antonio Texans of the CFL, and the Barcelona Dragons and Frankfurt Galaxy of the WLAF.

== Professional career ==
Garten was selected by the Green Bay Packers in the sixth round (164th pick overall) of the 1991 NFL draft.
