= LeRoy Etienne =

American football player (born 1966)

No. 50
- Position: Linebacker

Personal information
- Born: July 25, 1966 (age 60); Lafayette, Louisiana, U.S.
- Listed height: 6 ft 2 in (1.88 m)
- Listed weight: 245 lb (111 kg)

Career information
- High school: New Iberia (New Iberia, Louisiana)
- College: Nebraska (1985–1988)
- NFL draft: 1989: undrafted

Career history
- New York Giants (1989)*; Toronto Argonauts (1989); San Francisco 49ers (1990)
- * Offseason or practice squad member only

Awards and highlights
- First-team All-Big Eight (1988); Second-team All-Big Eight (1987)
- Stats at Pro Football Reference

LeRoy Joseph Etienne (born July 25, 1966) is an American former professional football linebacker who played for the San Francisco 49ers of the National Football League (NFL). He played college football for the Nebraska Cornhuskers.

== Early life ==
LeRoy Joseph Etienne was born on July 25, 1966, in Lafayette, Louisiana. He played high school football at New Iberia Senior High School in New Iberia, Louisiana. He made 210 solo tackles his senior year, earning first-team Parade All-American honors.

== College career ==
Etienne enrolled at the University of Nebraska–Lincoln to play college football for the Cornhuskers. He was a four-year varsity letterman 1985 to 1988. In 1985, he was promoted to the varsity team after starting the first three games for the freshman team. Etienne played in five varsity games during the 1985 season and posted three solo tackles. He recorded 38 tackles and two pass breakups as a backup inside linebacker in 1986, garnering Football News second-team sophomore All-American recognition.

Etienne totaled 39 solo tackles and 36 assisted tackles in 1987, earning Associated Press (AP) and United Press International (UPI) second-team All-Big Eight Conference honors and Coaches first-team All-Big Eight honors. As a senior in 1988, he recorded 52 solo tackles, 27 assisted tackles, three sacks, and three pass breakups. He was named first-team All-Big Eight by the AP, UPI, and Coaches for his performance during the 1988 season. Etienne finished his college career with 115 solo tackles, 80 assisted tackles, four sacks, one fumble recovery, and seven pass breakups. At the conclusion of his college career, he played in the East–West Shrine Game. He majored in special education at Nebraska.

== Professional career ==
After going undrafted in the 1989 NFL draft, Etienne signed with the New York Giants on May 5, 1989. He was released on September 4, 1989, before the start of the regular season.

Etienne was then signed to the practice roster of the Toronto Argonauts of the Canadian Football League. He was promoted to the active roster in mid-September 1989, and played in one game for the Argonauts. On September 23, 1989, it was reported that he had been released.

Etienne signed with the San Francisco 49ers on July 26, 1990. He was released on September 3 and later signed to the 49ers' practice squad on October 1. On October 17, he was promoted to the active roster to take the place of the injured Jim Fahnhorst. Etienne played in ten games for the 49ers during the 1990 season in a reserve role. He was released on August 26, 1991, before the start of the 1991 regular season.
