= Alfred Williams =

American football player (born 1968)

No. 94, 91
- Position: Defensive end

Personal information
- Born: November 6, 1968 (age 57); Houston, Texas, U.S.
- Listed height: 6 ft 6 in (1.98 m)
- Listed weight: 265 lb (120 kg)

Career information
- High school: Jones (Houston, Texas)
- College: Colorado
- NFL draft: 1991: 1st round, 18th overall pick

Career history
- Cincinnati Bengals (1991–1994); San Francisco 49ers (1995); Denver Broncos (1996–1999); New Orleans Saints (2000)*
- * Offseason or practice squad member only

Awards and highlights
- 2× Super Bowl champion (XXXII, XXXIII); First-team All-Pro (1996); Pro Bowl (1996); National champion (1990); Unanimous All-American (1990); Consensus All-American (1989); 2× Big Eight Defensive Player of the Year (1989, 1990); 2× First-team All-Big Eight (1989, 1990); Second-team All-Big Eight (1988)

Career NFL statistics
- Tackles: 316
- Sacks: 59.5
- Safeties: 2
- Stats at Pro Football Reference
- College Football Hall of Fame

Alfred Hamilton Williams (born November 6, 1968) is an American former professional football player who was a linebacker and defensive end in the National Football League (NFL) for the Cincinnati Bengals, San Francisco 49ers and Denver Broncos.

== College career ==
Williams played linebacker at the University of Colorado at Boulder. He was a unanimous All-American pick in 1990, a consensus All-American in 1989 and the 1990 Butkus Award winner. Williams was also the Captain of the 1990 Colorado National Championship Team. He ended his career with the Colorado Buffaloes with 263 tackles and 35 sacks. In 2008, he was included on the College Football Hall of Fame ballot. Then in 2010, he was elected to the College Football Hall of Fame.

== Professional career ==
Williams was selected by the Bengals in the first round (18th pick overall) of the 1991 NFL draft. He was a part of the Super Bowl champion Denver Broncos in 1997 and 1998. He was selected as an All-Pro defensive end in 1996. He retired from the game after the 1999 season.

== In media ==
From 2006 to 2019, Williams served as an on-air personality for Denver sports radio station KKFN. In February 2019, Williams left the station and signed with iHeartMedia, where he began hosting KOA's new afternoon drive show Big Al & JoJo beginning September 3, 2019.
