= List of All-Big Eight Conference football teams =

The All-Big Eight Conference football team was an annual All-Big Eight Conference honor bestowed on the best players in the conference following every college football season.

== Seasons ==
Following is a list of all-conference teams in the history of the Big Eight:

- 1925 All-Missouri Valley Conference football team
- 1926 All-Missouri Valley Conference football team
- 1927 All-Missouri Valley Conference football team
- 1928 All-Big Six Conference football team
- 1929 All-Big Six Conference football team
- 1930 All-Big Six Conference football team
- 1931 All-Big Six Conference football team
- 1932 All-Big Six Conference football team
- 1933 All-Big Six Conference football team
- 1934 All-Big Six Conference football team
- 1935 All-Big Six Conference football team
- 1936 All-Big Six Conference football team
- 1937 All-Big Six Conference football team
- 1938 All-Big Six Conference football team
- 1939 All-Big Six Conference football team
- 1940 All-Big Six Conference football team
- 1941 All-Big Six Conference football team
- 1942 All-Big Six Conference football team
- 1943 All-Big Six Conference football team
- 1944 All-Big Six Conference football team
- 1945 All-Big Six Conference football team
- 1946 All-Big Six Conference football team
- 1947 All-Big Six Conference football team
- 1948 All-Big Seven Conference football team
- 1949 All-Big Seven Conference football team
- 1950 All-Big Seven Conference football team
- 1951 All-Big Seven Conference football team
- 1952 All-Big Seven Conference football team
- 1953 All-Big Seven Conference football team
- 1954 All-Big Seven Conference football team
- 1955 All-Big Seven Conference football team
- 1956 All-Big Seven Conference football team
- 1957 All-Big Seven Conference football team
- 1958 All-Big Seven Conference football team
- 1959 All-Big Seven Conference football team
- 1960 All-Big Eight Conference football team
- 1961 All-Big Eight Conference football team
- 1962 All-Big Eight Conference football team
- 1963 All-Big Eight Conference football team
- 1964 All-Big Eight Conference football team
- 1965 All-Big Eight Conference football team
- 1966 All-Big Eight Conference football team
- 1967 All-Big Eight Conference football team
- 1968 All-Big Eight Conference football team
- 1969 All-Big Eight Conference football team
- 1970 All-Big Eight Conference football team
- 1971 All-Big Eight Conference football team
- 1972 All-Big Eight Conference football team
- 1973 All-Big Eight Conference football team
- 1974 All-Big Eight Conference football team
- 1975 All-Big Eight Conference football team
- 1976 All-Big Eight Conference football team
- 1977 All-Big Eight Conference football team
- 1978 All-Big Eight Conference football team
- 1979 All-Big Eight Conference football team
- 1980 All-Big Eight Conference football team
- 1981 All-Big Eight Conference football team
- 1982 All-Big Eight Conference football team
- 1983 All-Big Eight Conference football team
- 1984 All-Big Eight Conference football team
- 1985 All-Big Eight Conference football team
- 1986 All-Big Eight Conference football team
- 1987 All-Big Eight Conference football team
- 1988 All-Big Eight Conference football team
- 1989 All-Big Eight Conference football team
- 1990 All-Big Eight Conference football team
- 1991 All-Big Eight Conference football team
- 1992 All-Big Eight Conference football team
- 1993 All-Big Eight Conference football team
- 1994 All-Big Eight Conference football team
- 1995 All-Big Eight Conference football team
