= Mike Busch (baseball) =

American baseball player (born 1968)

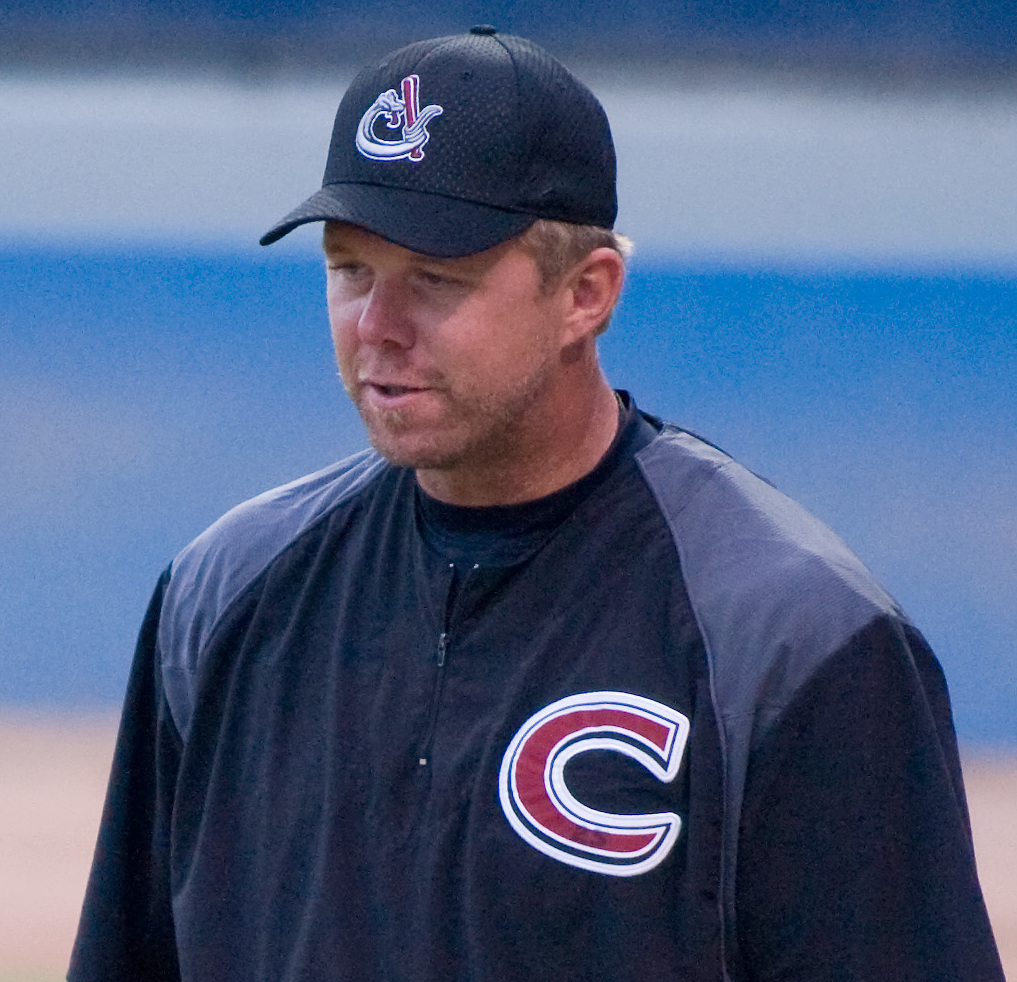
- Busch with the Calgary Vipers in 2008
- Third baseman
- Born: July 7, 1968 (age 57); Davenport, Iowa, U.S.
- Batted: Right Threw: Right

Professional debut
- MLB: August 30, 1995, for the Los Angeles Dodgers
- KBO: April 11, 1998, for the Hanwha Eagles

Last appearance
- MLB: August 10, 1996, for the Los Angeles Dodgers
- KBO: August 17, 1998, for the Hanwha Eagles

MLB statistics
- Batting average: .220
- Home runs: 7
- Runs batted in: 23

KBO statistics
- Batting average: .213
- Home runs: 10
- Runs batted in: 28
- Stats at Baseball Reference

Teams
- Los Angeles Dodgers (1995–1996); Hanwha Eagles (1998)

Michael Anthony Busch (born July 7, 1968) is an American former professional baseball player and manager. He played in Major League Baseball as a third baseman for the Los Angeles Dodgers, and also in the KBO League for the Hanwha Eagles.

Busch is an alumnus of Iowa State University where he played both baseball and American football. As a senior in 1989 he was a consensus All-American in football. He was drafted by the Los Angeles Dodgers in the 4th round of the 1990 MLB amateur draft. He made his Major League Baseball debut with the Los Angeles Dodgers on August 30, 1995, becoming the first replacement player to be promoted to a regular MLB roster after the 1994 Major League Baseball strike. Because of his status as a replacement player, Busch was never allowed membership in the MLBPA. He appeared in his final game on August 10, 1996.

Beginning in the 2005 season, Busch was named the head coach of the Calgary Vipers, an independent minor league baseball team in the Northern League. The team has since moved to the Golden Baseball League. On December 1, 2008, the Schaumburg Flyers of the Northern League announced Mike Busch as their new manager for the 2009 season. He remained the Flyers' manager until the team folded before the 2011 season.
