= Elaphrus finitimus =

Scientific classification
- Kingdom: Animalia
- Phylum: Arthropoda
- Clade: Pancrustacea
- Class: Insecta
- Order: Coleoptera
- Suborder: Adephaga
- Family: Carabidae
- Genus: Elaphrus
- Species: E. finitimus

Binomial name
- Elaphrus finitimus Casey, 1920

Species of beetle

Elaphrus finitimus is a species of ground beetle in the subfamily Elaphrinae. It was described by Casey in 1920.
