= Elaphrus tuberculatus =

Scientific classification
- Kingdom: Animalia
- Phylum: Arthropoda
- Clade: Pancrustacea
- Class: Insecta
- Order: Coleoptera
- Suborder: Adephaga
- Family: Carabidae
- Genus: Elaphrus
- Species: E. tuberculatus

Binomial name
- Elaphrus tuberculatus Maklin, 1878

Species of beetle

Elaphrus tuberculatus is a species of ground beetle in the subfamily Elaphrinae. It was described by Maklin in 1878.
