= Elaphrus ullrichii =

Scientific classification
- Kingdom: Animalia
- Phylum: Arthropoda
- Clade: Pancrustacea
- Class: Insecta
- Order: Coleoptera
- Suborder: Adephaga
- Family: Carabidae
- Genus: Elaphrus
- Species: E. ullrichii

Binomial name
- Elaphrus ullrichii W. Redtenbacher, 1842

Species of beetle

Elaphrus ullrichii is a species of ground beetle in the subfamily Elaphrinae. It was described by W. Redtenbacher in 1842.
