= Elaphrus comatus =

Scientific classification
- Kingdom: Animalia
- Phylum: Arthropoda
- Clade: Pancrustacea
- Class: Insecta
- Order: Coleoptera
- Suborder: Adephaga
- Family: Carabidae
- Genus: Elaphrus
- Species: E. comatus

Binomial name
- Elaphrus comatus Goulet, 1983

Species of beetle

Elaphrus comatus is a species of ground beetle in the subfamily Elaphrinae. It was described by Goulet in 1983.
