= Elaphrus purpurans =

Scientific classification
- Kingdom: Animalia
- Phylum: Arthropoda
- Clade: Pancrustacea
- Class: Insecta
- Order: Coleoptera
- Suborder: Adephaga
- Family: Carabidae
- Genus: Elaphrus
- Species: E. purpurans

Binomial name
- Elaphrus purpurans Hausen, 1891

Species of beetle

Elaphrus purpurans is a species of ground beetle in the subfamily Elaphrinae. It was described by Hausen in 1891.
