= Elaphrus trossulus =

Scientific classification
- Kingdom: Animalia
- Phylum: Arthropoda
- Clade: Pancrustacea
- Class: Insecta
- Order: Coleoptera
- Suborder: Adephaga
- Family: Carabidae
- Genus: Elaphrus
- Species: E. trossulus

Binomial name
- Elaphrus trossulus Semenov, 1904

Synonyms
- Elaphrus parviceps

Species of beetle

Elaphrus trossulus is a species of ground beetle in the subfamily Elaphrinae. It was described by Semenov in 1904.
