= Elaphrus weissi =

Scientific classification
- Kingdom: Animalia
- Phylum: Arthropoda
- Clade: Pancrustacea
- Class: Insecta
- Order: Coleoptera
- Suborder: Adephaga
- Family: Carabidae
- Genus: Elaphrus
- Species: E. weissi

Binomial name
- Elaphrus weissi Dosal, 1996

Species of beetle

Elaphrus weissi is a species of ground beetle in the subfamily Elaphrinae. It was described by Dosal in 1996.
