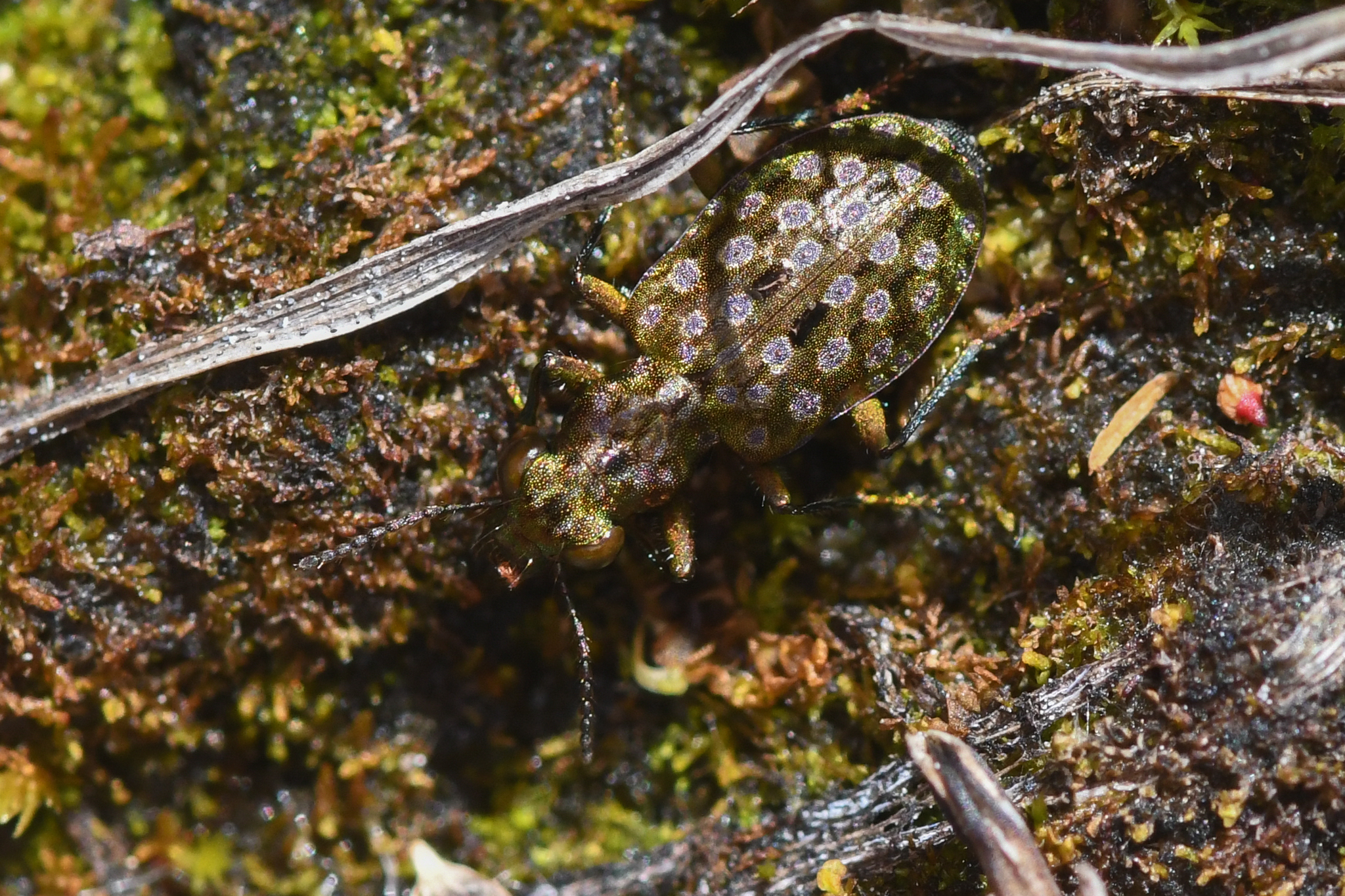

Scientific classification
- Kingdom: Animalia
- Phylum: Arthropoda
- Clade: Pancrustacea
- Class: Insecta
- Order: Coleoptera
- Suborder: Adephaga
- Family: Carabidae
- Genus: Elaphrus
- Species: E. americanus

Binomial name
- Elaphrus americanus Dejean, 1831

= Elaphrus americanus =

Species of ground beetle

Elaphrus americanus is a species of ground beetle in the subfamily Elaphrinae. It was described by Pierre François Marie Auguste Dejean in 1831. It is found in much of Canada.
