= Elaphrus clairvillei =

Scientific classification
- Kingdom: Animalia
- Phylum: Arthropoda
- Clade: Pancrustacea
- Class: Insecta
- Order: Coleoptera
- Suborder: Adephaga
- Family: Carabidae
- Genus: Elaphrus
- Species: E. clairvillei

Binomial name
- Elaphrus clairvillei Kirby, 1837

Species of beetle

Elaphrus clairvillei is a species of ground beetle in the subfamily Elaphrinae. It was described by William Kirby in 1837.
