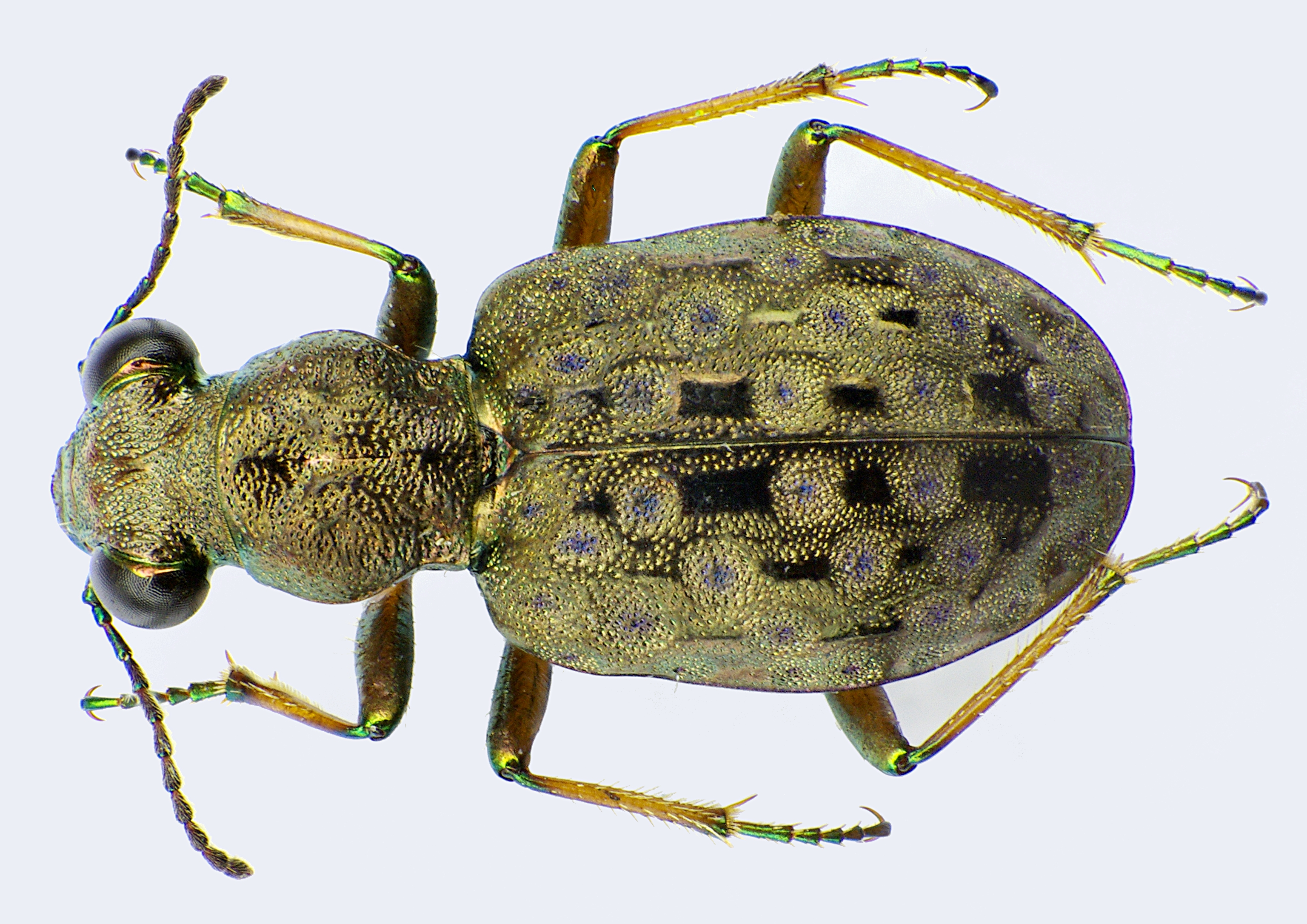

Scientific classification
- Kingdom: Animalia
- Phylum: Arthropoda
- Clade: Pancrustacea
- Class: Insecta
- Order: Coleoptera
- Suborder: Adephaga
- Family: Carabidae
- Genus: Elaphrus
- Species: E. aureus

Binomial name
- Elaphrus aureus P.W.J. Muller, 1821

= Elaphrus aureus =

Species of ground beetle

Elaphrus aureus is a species of ground beetle in the subfamily Elaphrinae. It was described by P.W.J. Muller in 1821.
