= Elaphrus californicus =

Scientific classification
- Kingdom: Animalia
- Phylum: Arthropoda
- Clade: Pancrustacea
- Class: Insecta
- Order: Coleoptera
- Suborder: Adephaga
- Family: Carabidae
- Genus: Elaphrus
- Species: E. californicus

Binomial name
- Elaphrus californicus Mannerheim, 1843

Species of ground beetle

Elaphrus californicus is a species of ground beetle in the subfamily Elaphrinae. It was described by Mannerheim in 1843.
