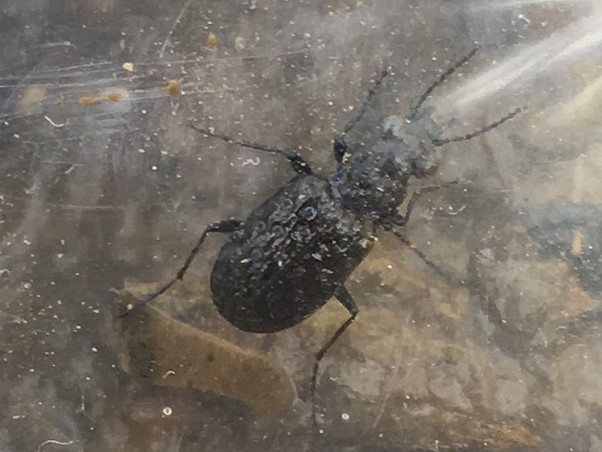

Scientific classification
- Kingdom: Animalia
- Phylum: Arthropoda
- Clade: Pancrustacea
- Class: Insecta
- Order: Coleoptera
- Suborder: Adephaga
- Family: Carabidae
- Genus: Elaphrus
- Species: E. sugai

Binomial name
- Elaphrus sugai Nanake, 1987

= Elaphrus sugai =

Species of ground beetle

Elaphrus sugai is a species of ground beetle in the subfamily Elaphrinae, described by Nanake in 1987.
