= Elaphrus splendidus =

Scientific classification
- Kingdom: Animalia
- Phylum: Arthropoda
- Clade: Pancrustacea
- Class: Insecta
- Order: Coleoptera
- Suborder: Adephaga
- Family: Carabidae
- Genus: Elaphrus
- Species: E. splendidus

Binomial name
- Elaphrus splendidus Fisher von Wandheim, 1829

Species of beetle

Elaphrus splendidus is a species of ground beetle in the subfamily Elaphrinae. It was described by Fisher von Wandheim in 1829.
