= Elaphrus pyrenoeus =

Scientific classification
- Kingdom: Animalia
- Phylum: Arthropoda
- Clade: Pancrustacea
- Class: Insecta
- Order: Coleoptera
- Suborder: Adephaga
- Family: Carabidae
- Genus: Elaphrus
- Species: E. pyrenoeus

Binomial name
- Elaphrus pyrenoeus Motschulsky, 1850

Species of beetle

Elaphrus pyrenoeus is a species of ground beetle in the subfamily Elaphrinae. It was described by Victor Motschulsky in 1850.
