= Elaphrus tibetanus =

Scientific classification
- Kingdom: Animalia
- Phylum: Arthropoda
- Clade: Pancrustacea
- Class: Insecta
- Order: Coleoptera
- Suborder: Adephaga
- Family: Carabidae
- Genus: Elaphrus
- Species: E. tibetanus

Binomial name
- Elaphrus tibetanus Semenov, 1904

Species of beetle

Elaphrus tibetanus is a species of ground beetle in the subfamily Elaphrinae. It was described by Semenov in 1904.
