= Elaphrus citharus =

Scientific classification
- Kingdom: Animalia
- Phylum: Arthropoda
- Clade: Pancrustacea
- Class: Insecta
- Order: Coleoptera
- Suborder: Adephaga
- Family: Carabidae
- Genus: Elaphrus
- Species: E. citharus

Binomial name
- Elaphrus citharus Goulet & Smetana, 1997

Species of beetle

Elaphrus citharus is a species of ground beetle in the subfamily Elaphrinae. It was described by Goulet & Smetana in 1997.
