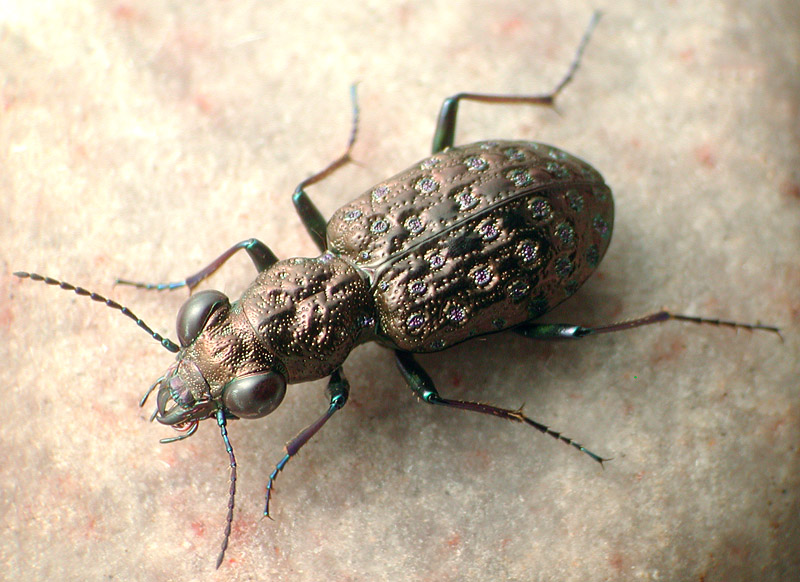

Scientific classification
- Kingdom: Animalia
- Phylum: Arthropoda
- Clade: Pancrustacea
- Class: Insecta
- Order: Coleoptera
- Suborder: Adephaga
- Family: Carabidae
- Genus: Elaphrus
- Species: E. cicatricosus

Binomial name
- Elaphrus cicatricosus LeConte, 1848

= Elaphrus cicatricosus =

Species of beetle

Elaphrus cicatricosus is a species of ground beetle in the subfamily Elaphrinae. It was described by John Lawrence LeConte in 1848.
