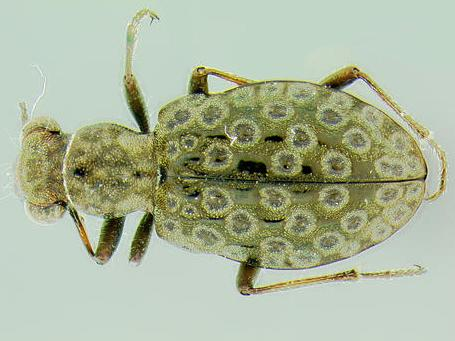

Scientific classification
- Kingdom: Animalia
- Phylum: Arthropoda
- Clade: Pancrustacea
- Class: Insecta
- Order: Coleoptera
- Suborder: Adephaga
- Family: Carabidae
- Genus: Elaphrus
- Species: E. angulonotus

Binomial name
- Elaphrus angulonotus Shi & Liang, 2008

= Elaphrus angulonotus =

Species of ground beetle

Elaphrus angulonotus is a species of ground beetle in the subfamily Elaphrinae. It was described by Shi & Liang in 2008.
