= Elaphrus olivaceus =

Scientific classification
- Kingdom: Animalia
- Phylum: Arthropoda
- Clade: Pancrustacea
- Class: Insecta
- Order: Coleoptera
- Suborder: Adephaga
- Family: Carabidae
- Genus: Elaphrus
- Species: E. olivaceus

Binomial name
- Elaphrus olivaceus LeConte, 1863

Species of beetle

Elaphrus olivaceus is a species of ground beetle in the subfamily Elaphrinae. It was first described by John Lawrence LeConte in 1863.
