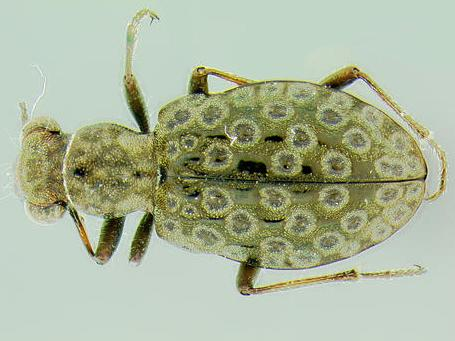

Scientific classification
- Kingdom: Animalia
- Phylum: Arthropoda
- Clade: Pancrustacea
- Class: Insecta
- Order: Coleoptera
- Suborder: Adephaga
- Family: Carabidae
- Genus: Elaphrus
- Species: E. angusticollis

Binomial name
- Elaphrus angusticollis R. F. Sahlberg, 1844

= Elaphrus angusticollis =

Species of ground beetle

Elaphrus angusticollis is a species of ground beetle in the subfamily Elaphrinae. It was described by R. F. Sahlberg in 1844.
