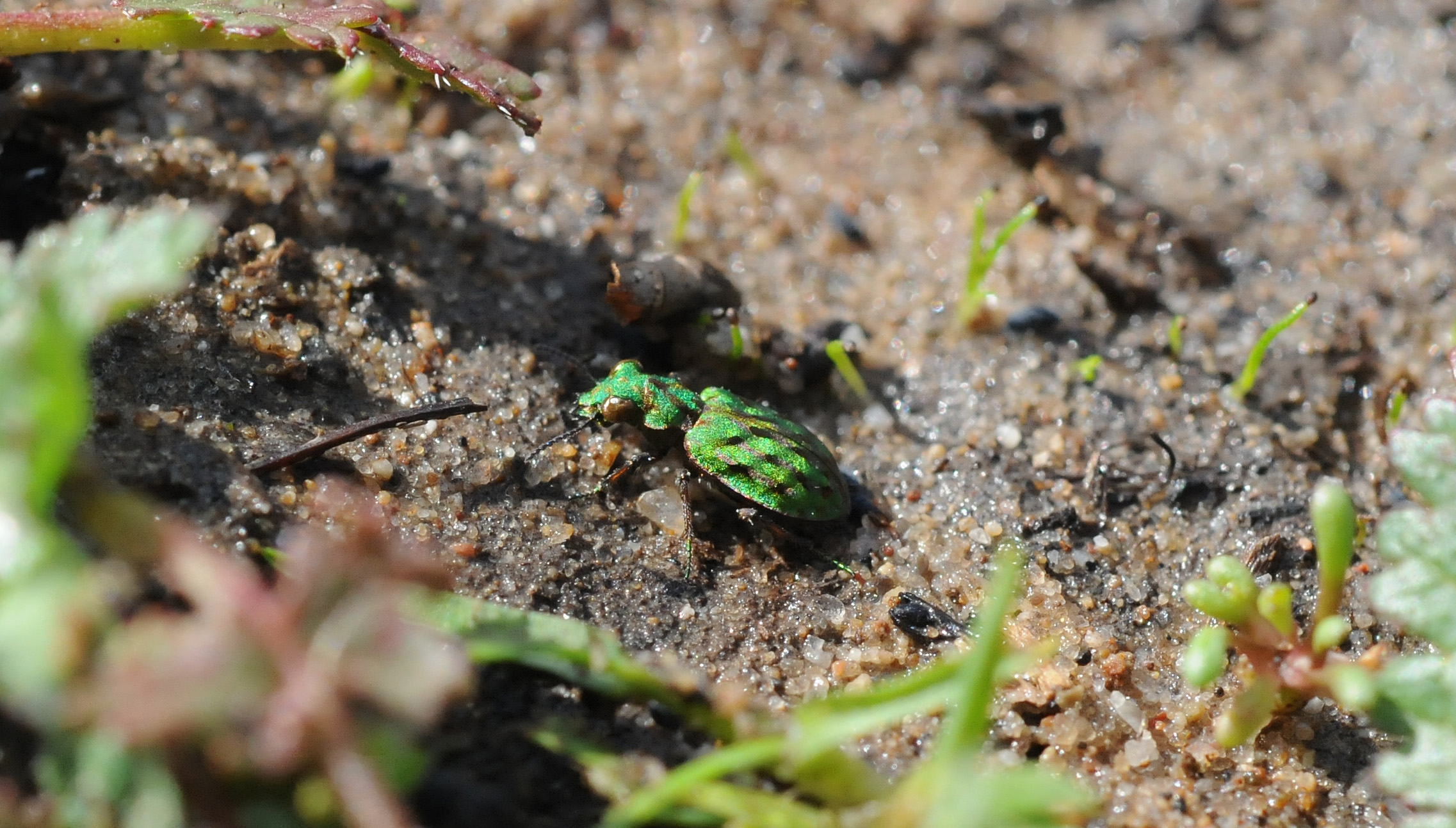

Conservation status
- Critically Endangered (IUCN 2.3)

Scientific classification
- Kingdom: Animalia
- Phylum: Arthropoda
- Clade: Pancrustacea
- Class: Insecta
- Order: Coleoptera
- Suborder: Adephaga
- Family: Carabidae
- Genus: Elaphrus
- Species: E. viridis

Binomial name
- Elaphrus viridis Horn, 1878

= Elaphrus viridis =

Delta green ground beetle

Species of beetle

Elaphrus viridis, the Delta green ground beetle, is a species of ground beetle restricted to a small region within Solano County, California. Its color is a metallic-green, usually with bronze spots on its elytra, though some lack these spots. The lack or reduction of circular pits on the elytra helps distinguish it from other ground beetles. Typical adults are about a quarter-inch (0.6 cm) in length.

The Delta green ground beetle plays a useful role in its ecosystem by pollinating plants, fruits, and vegetables.

The species name, viridis, comes from the Latin word for green.

== Range and distribution ==
The Delta green ground beetle is known to only occur in Solano County, California, though it may have historically occurred throughout the Central Valley. It is known to inhabit Jepson Prairie Preserve, south of Dixon, where it is protected; however, the beetle's other known ranges are located on public land.

The beetle occupies vernal pool habitats, around which its life cycle is based: it emerges in January following the filling of vernal pools from winter rains and lies dormant in May (around when the pools dry up) as a means of surviving the summer.

Specimens of the Delta green ground beetle have generally been collected in open habitats, namely the edges of vernal pools and nearby trails, roads and ditches. They may also be present in the surrounding grasslands, but the beetle's small size, camouflage against spring grass, and tendency to hide beneath low growth make it difficult to locate.

== Reproduction ==
The Delta green ground beetle breeds through January and September, with females producing one generation per year.

== Diet ==
The Delta green ground beetle, in both its larval and adult stages, actively hunts soft-bodied arthropods. Based on the habits of other species of Elaphrus, it is likely that the beetle feeds primarily on springtails.

== Conservation status ==
The Delta green ground beetle's current IUCN Red List status is Critically Endangered, owing to the species' extremely limited range and the endangerment of its vital vernal pool habitats. In addition, the species has been federally listed as threatened since 1980.

The destruction of vernal pool habitats in California is largely the result of agricultural development, though urbanization and grazing have played some role in their elimination. Another significant threat to the beetle is the introduced Garden lippia, which grows in dense mats in these habitats and impairs its ability to forage.
