= Dixon High School =

Dixon High School may refer to:

- Dixon High School (California) - Dixon, California
- Dixon High School (Illinois) - Dixon, Illinois
- Dixon High School (Missouri) - Dixon, Missouri, a high school in Pulaski County
- Dixon High School (North Carolina) - Holly Ridge, North Carolina, a high school in Holly Ridge, North Carolina
