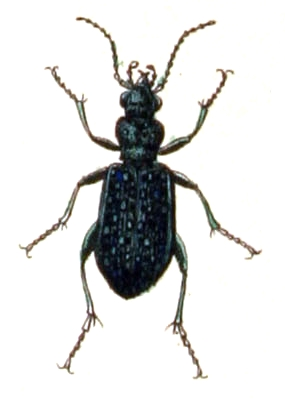

Scientific classification
- Kingdom: Animalia
- Phylum: Arthropoda
- Clade: Pancrustacea
- Class: Insecta
- Order: Coleoptera
- Suborder: Adephaga
- Family: Carabidae
- Genus: Elaphrus
- Subgenus: Elaphrus (Neoelaphrus)
- Species: E. uliginosus

Binomial name
- Elaphrus uliginosus Fabricius, 1792

= Elaphrus uliginosus =

Species of beetle

Elaphrus uliginosus is a species of ground beetle native to the Palearctic realm. It is widespread but rare in Europe, and is absent from much of Southern Europe. It is a wetland and coastal species.
