= Jackson Fay Brown House =

Historic house in California, United States

- U.S. National Register of Historic Places
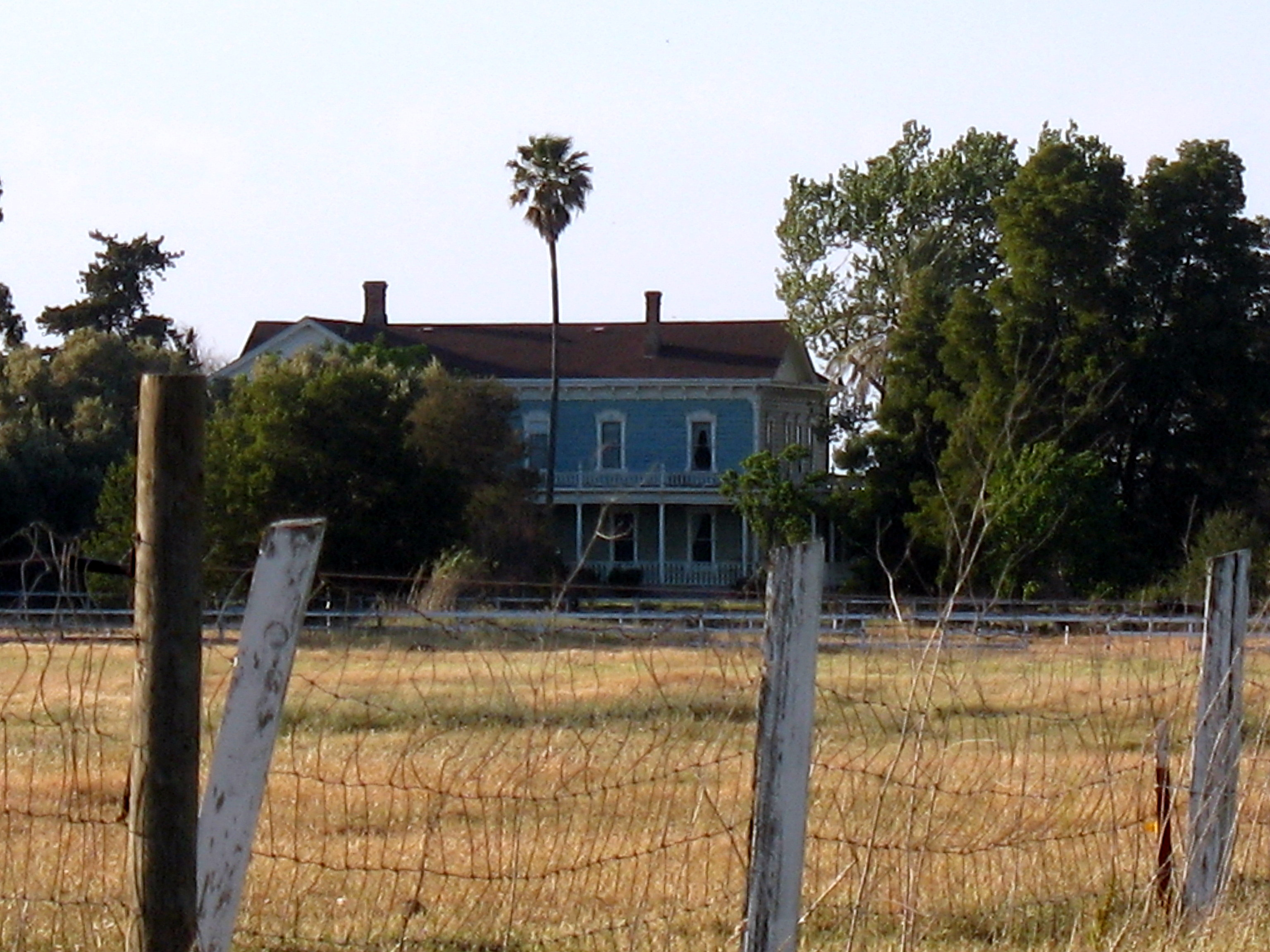

- Location within California Location within the United States
- Location: 6751 Maine Prairie Road, Dixon, California
- Coordinates: 38.33458°N 121.81422°W
- Area: 79.8 acres (32.3 ha)
- Built: 1888
- Architect: Nathaniel Dudley Goodell
- Architectural style: Italianate, Greek Revival
- NRHP reference No.: 02001289
- Added to NRHP: November 7, 2002

The Jackson Fay Brown House is a historic site in Dixon, California. Designed by Nathaniel Dudley Goodell, the house was built in 1888, in an Italianate style with elements of Greek Revival. It was added to the U.S. National Register of Historic Places on November 7, 2002.

== House ==
The house is built of redwood timber on a brick foundation in a primarily Italianate style; it has two stories and twenty rooms, It was designed by Nathaniel Dudley Goodell of Sacramento and built on farmed land; the brick smokehouse and the three-story water tank house, attached to the house in the late 19th century, date to the period of its construction, with the iron doors to the smokehouse reportedly having originally belonged to the Maine Prairie Rifles militia armory, which was built in about 1863. The plan of the house resembles a "Z", with wings at the northeast and southwest corners. The siding is also redwood, with pilaster corners and triangular pedimented gables constituting elements of Greek Revival style. A porch with Tuscan-style columns wraps around the south and east sides of the house, and there is a balustraded balcony on the second floor. The gable ends have fishtail shingles, and the cornice is ornamented with carved brackets with finials. Carved crowns appear above both the windows and the ventilators in the gable ends.

== History ==
Jackson Fay Brown, who was from Vermont and came to California via Panama in the 1850s, became a wealthy farmer in the Dixon area and served as a supervisor and deputy assessor in Solano County and then in 1889 as a California assemblyman. He had the house built after building two previous houses himself; construction began in July 1887 and finished in January 1888, at a cost of between $8,000 and $11,000. It was lit by gas and surrounded by fruit trees and a vineyard.

Brown died suddenly in April 1910 and his wife presumably inherited the house; after her death their youngest son, Clayton Brown, who was disabled, remained there and in the 1930s part of the property was converted into a separate residence. After his death in 1957 the house passed to his nephew. The Brown family divided the land, and finally sold the house in 1994. It was unoccupied in the 1970s and 1980s and fell into disrepair; it was restored in the late 1990s, including replication in redwood of some damaged columns, corner boards, and decorative elements with changes to the placement of windows and doors and the removal of one of the three chimneys. At some point a windmill originally attached to the tank house was removed. A horse barn, garages, a pump house, a shed, and a gazebo were constructed during the 20th century, and a conservatory was added to the house in 1992.
