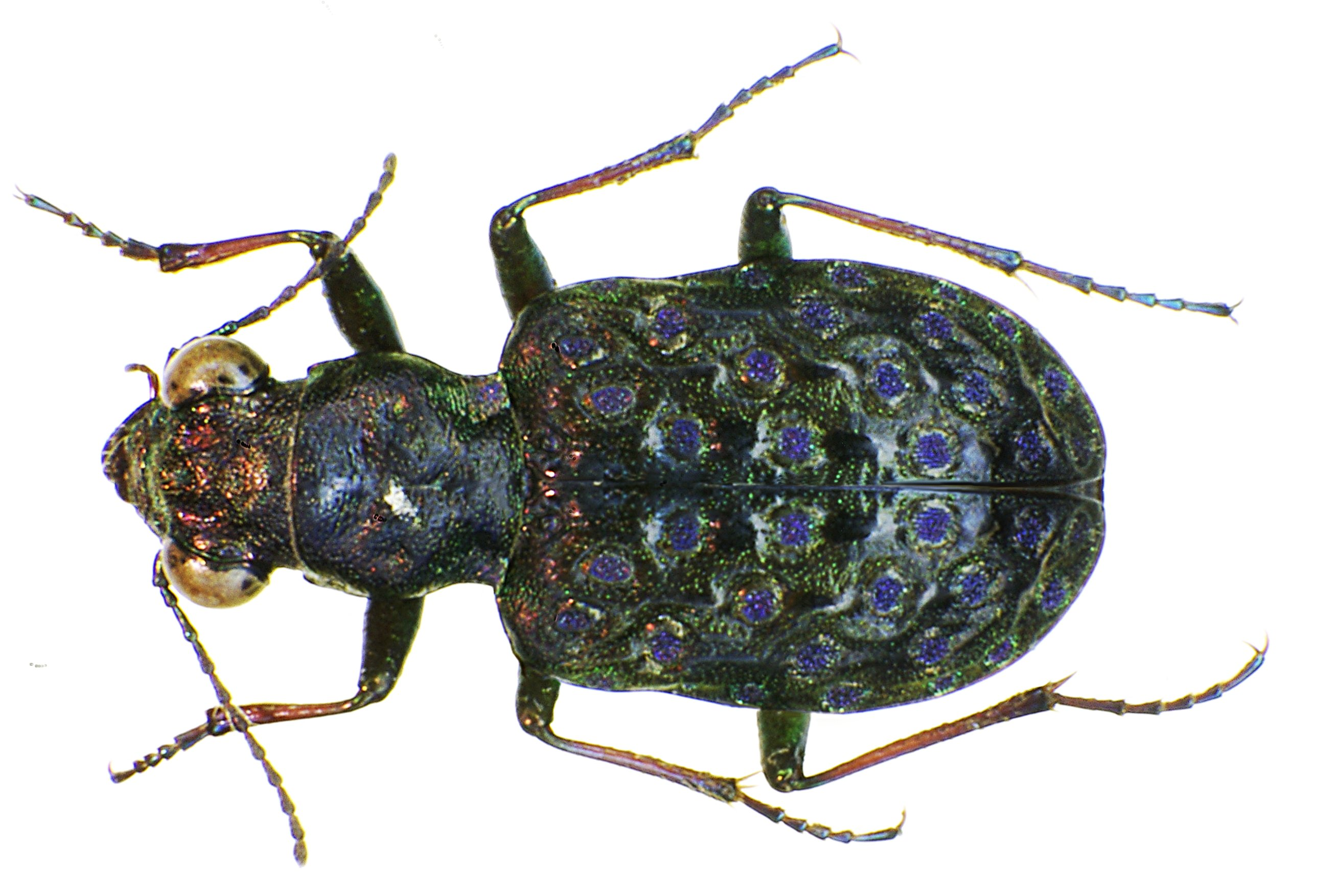

Scientific classification
- Kingdom: Animalia
- Phylum: Arthropoda
- Clade: Pancrustacea
- Class: Insecta
- Order: Coleoptera
- Suborder: Adephaga
- Family: Carabidae
- Genus: Elaphrus
- Species: E. cupreus

Binomial name
- Elaphrus cupreus Duftschmid, 1812

= Elaphrus cupreus =

Species of beetle

Elaphrus cupreus is a species of ground beetle native to the Palearctic. In Europe, it is found in Austria, Belarus, Belgium, Bosnia and Herzegovina, Great Britain including Shetland, Orkney, Hebrides and Isle of Man, the Czech Republic, mainland Denmark, Estonia, Finland, mainland France, Germany, Hungary, the Republic of Ireland, mainland Italy, Kaliningrad, Latvia, Liechtenstein, Lithuania, Luxembourg, Northern Ireland, mainland Norway, Poland, Russia, Slovakia, Slovenia, Sweden, Switzerland, the Netherlands, and Ukraine.
