= Dixon Naval Radio Transmitter Facility =

Military radio transmitter in California, United States

Dixon Naval Radio Transmitter Facility is a facility of the US Navy in Dixon, California, United States for military radio transmissions in the shortwave and VLF range. The facility, which covers an area of 1314 acres, was operated continuously by the US Navy until 1979, when it was converted to a contractor-operated facility. The tallest structure of the facility are two VLF-transmission masts, each 194.16 metres ( 637 ft) tall, situated at 38°21′54″N 121°46′30″W and 38°22′27″N 121°46′57″W.

Until the end of the 1990s, the station was controlled by the Naval Communications Station, Stockton, California. Naval Computer and Telecommunications Station San Diego has oversight of operations via contract.
