= First Northern Bank =

Community bank in California, United States

First Northern Community Bancorp
- Type: Public
- Traded as: OTCQX: FNRN
- Industry: Banking
- Founded: 1910
- Headquarters: Dixon, California
- Area served: Auburn, Davis, Dixon, Fairfield, Rancho Cordova, Roseville, Sacramento, Vacaville, Walnut Creek, West Sacramento, Winters, Woodland, Colusa, Orland and Willows
- Key people: Jeremiah Z. Smith, President & CEO Sean P. Quinn, Chairman of the Board Richard M. Martinez, Vice Chairman of the Board
- Number of employees: 230-250
- Website: www.thatsmybank.com

First Northern Bank is a community bank with headquarters in Dixon, California, United States. It was founded in 1910. The bank serves Solano, Yolo, Sacramento, Placer, El Dorado, Glenn, and Colusa counties with 14 full service branches.

The Bank's portfolio of loans includes commercial loans, agriculture loans, real estate mortgage loans, and real estate construction loans. Its primary lending focus is on commercial (including agricultural), construction and real estate mortgages.

FDIC Insured since January 1, 1934.

One of only 10 banks in California that is over 100 years old.

== History ==
An older First Northern Bank branch, located in Winters, CA

First Northern Bank opened for business on February 1, 1910. On January 20 of that year, 25 men and women organized the state-chartered savings bank, Northern Solano Bank. Henry R. Timm of Dixon was elected the first president of the newly organized Northern Solano Bank.

On January 2, 1912, the Bank received approval of its application to establish the First National Bank of Dixon, a commercial bank. In 1954, the Comptroller of the Currency gave final approval to consolidate First National Bank and Northern Solano Bank into the First National Bank of Dixon, effective as of the close of business Friday, April 8, 1955. On January l, 1980, the Federal Charter was relinquished in favor of a State Charter, and the Bank's name was changed to First Northern Bank of Dixon.

In 2008, First Northern Bank begun its large project of installing 1,675 photovoltaic solar panels (26,767 sq ft, more than half an acre total) atop four of their bank buildings. Combined, these systems have a generating capacity of approximately 296 kilowatts of electricity.

In 2023, First Northern Bank acquired 3 branches from Columbia Bank, located in Glenn and Colusa counties.

== Locations ==
California

- Auburn Financial Center
- Davis Financial Center
- Dixon Financial Center
- Fairfield Financial Center
- Rancho Cordova (Opening 2019)
- Roseville Financial Center
- Sacramento Financial Center
- Vacaville Financial Center
- Walnut Creek
- West Sacramento Financial Center
- Winters Branch
- Woodland Branch
- Orland Branch
- Colusa Branch
- Willows Branch

== Key dates ==
- 1910: Opened for business in Dixon, CA as a state-chartered savings bank, Northern Solano Bank.
- 1980: In order to reduce Federal Reserve requirements and operate with higher lending limits, the Federal Charter was relinquished in favor of a State Charter, and the Bank's name was changed to First Northern Bank of Dixon.
- 1993: A new 33,000 sq. ft. Operations Center was built in Dixon, Ca.
- 2000: The Board of Directors unanimously voted in favor of creating a bank holding company—First Northern Community Bancorp.
- 2002: The Bank received its Trust Powers from the California Department of Financial Institutions and FDIC. The Asset Management & Trust Department opened for business.
- 2010: First Northern Bank celebrated its first 100 years in business.
- 2013: The Bank expanded into neighboring Contra Costa County with a loan production office in Walnut Creek.
- 2023: Newly acquired Orland, Colusa, and Willows branches joined the bank.
