= Milk Farm Restaurant =

Restaurant in Dixon, California

Coordinates: 38.47551°N 121.82128°W

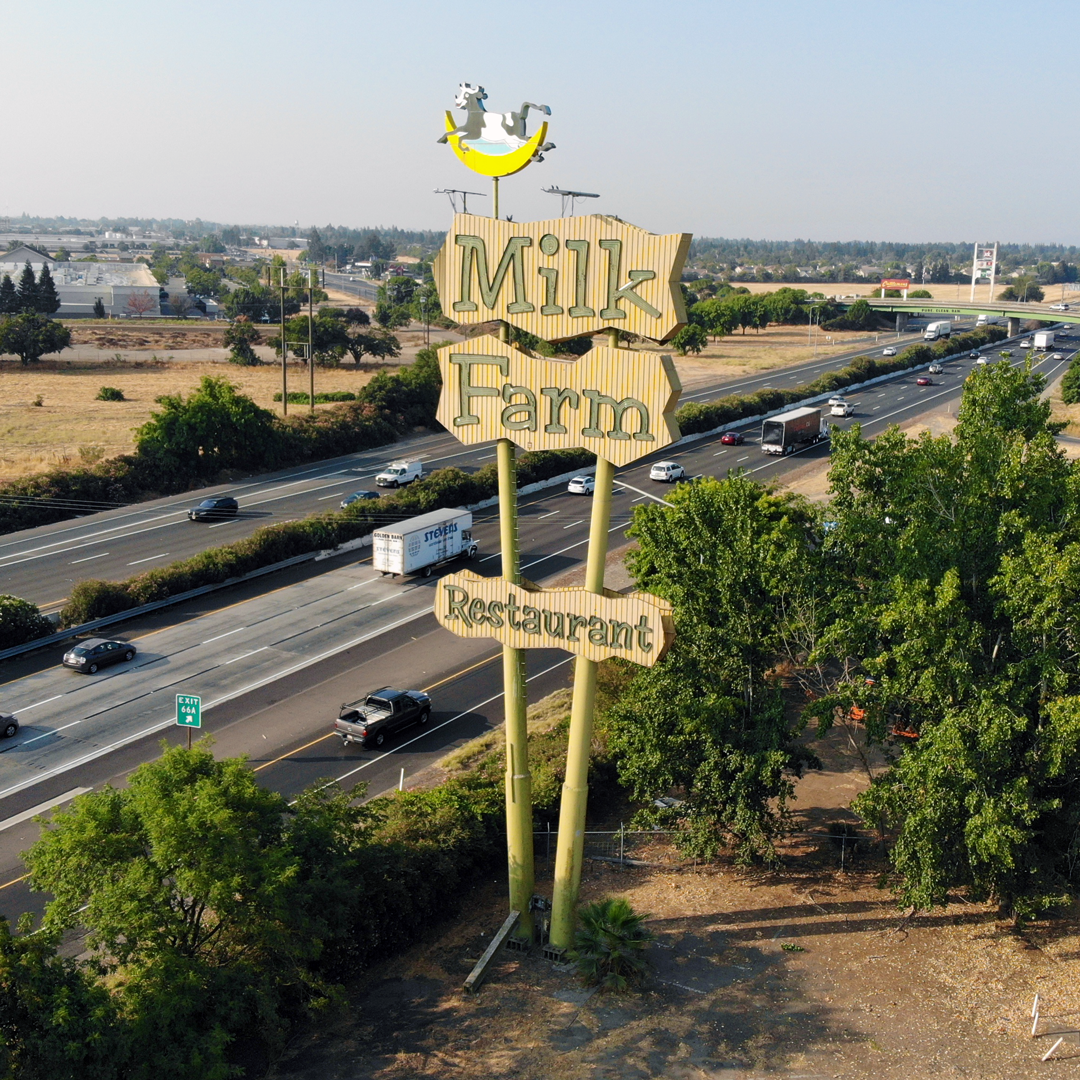
Milk Farm sign

Milk Farm Restaurant was a restaurant in Dixon, California off I-80, that played a part in Dixon's dairy economy during World War II. It was considered to be the city's landmark.

== History ==
Karl A. Hess had the idea to build the Milk Farm restaurant in 1919. He built his first restaurant in 1924 on Sievers Road. It moved to the current Milk Farm Road location along Interstate 80 in 1939. Originally called Hess Station, it gained the moniker Milk Farm in 1940 when The Saturday Evening Post wrote an article about it, and also gave Dixon the nickname “Dairy Town” for its contribution to the California dairy industry.

During World War II, Mr. Hess offered various deals, such as an all-you-can-drink milk contest for only 10 cents, pony rides for children, and reasonably priced chicken dinners. The Milk Farm became a hangout for teenagers, and people competed to break the record of the most milk consumed in order to get their names on the restaurant's record board.

In 1946 Glynn and Homer Henderson became the new owners of the restaurant. The restaurant stayed open for many decades until closing in 1986 after a large hole was blown in the roof during a violent windstorm. The restaurant building was removed in 2000.

A Milk Farm sign, measuring 100 feet tall, was built in May 1963 and still stands today. Even after closing, the Milk Farm's animated neon road sign stayed illuminated for years afterward due to its local popularity.

== Future plans ==
Though the building is no longer at its original location, it has been placed in storage with the possibility of future restoration and placement in a local history museum. As of 2007, there were tentative plans to turn the property into a business plaza.

As of 2022, Milk Farm Development LLC purchased the entire 60 acre property. The principals of the firm plan on restoring the historical Milk Farm Restaurant and other highway commercial services.

In 2024, the property was sold to 4G Holdings XVII LLC and SSB Dixon LLC. The new owners said in November 2025 they were still in the early stages of evaluating potential uses for the site. They told KTXL TV, "We understand there’s community interest in the history of the property and the sign, and we’ll be taking that into account as we assess next steps".
