= Dixon, California =

City in California, United States

- City
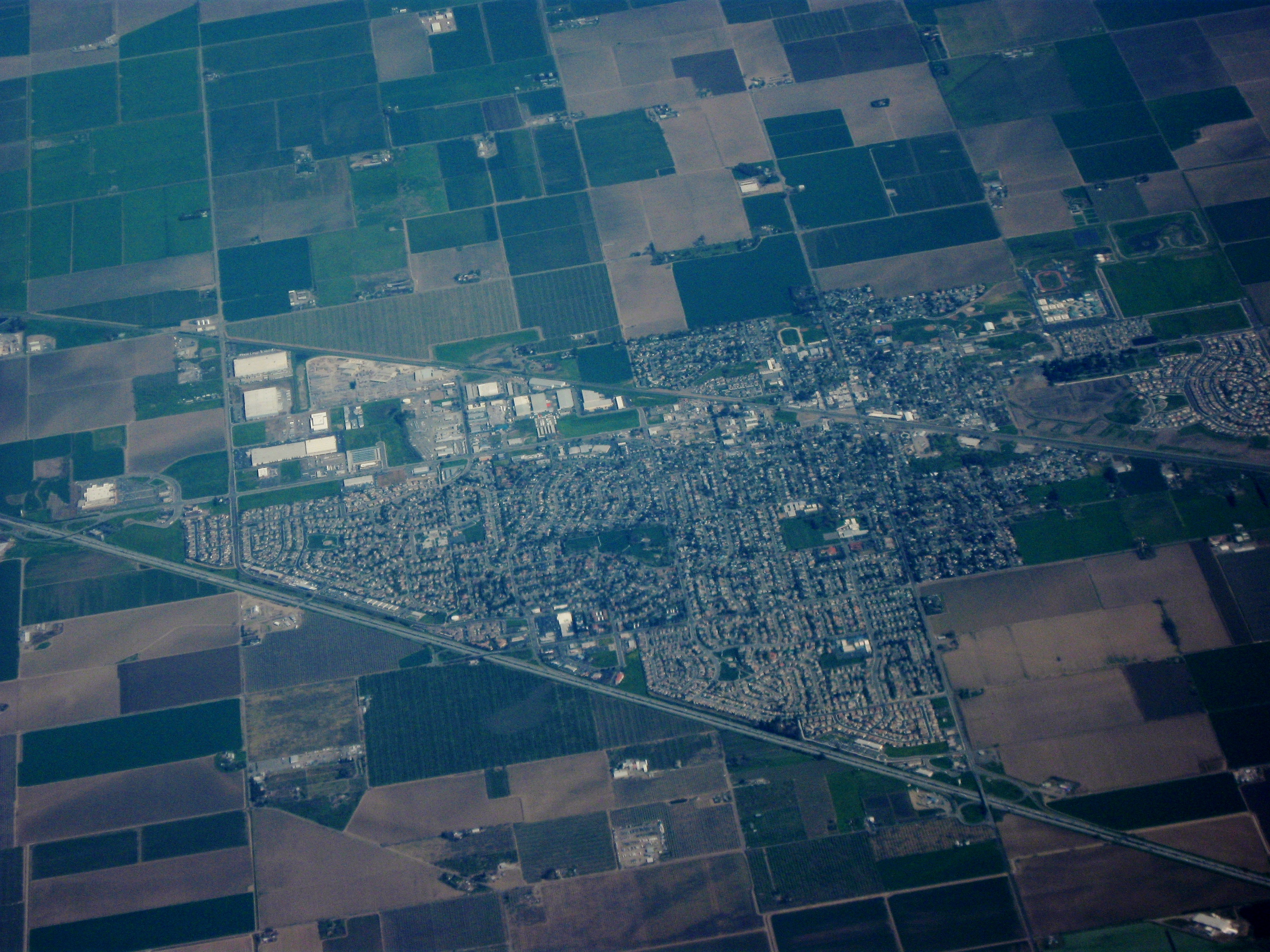
- Aerial view of Dixon

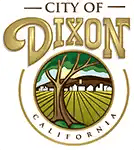
- Seal
- Nicknames: Purple Heart City, Dairy City
- Interactive map of Dixon, California
- Location within California Location within the United States
- Coordinates: 38°26′57″N 121°49′37″W
- Country: United States
- State: California
- County: Solano
- Incorporated: March 30, 1878
- Named for: Thomas Dickson

Government
  - Mayor: Steve Bird
  - City manager: Jim Lindley
  - State senator: Christopher Cabaldon (D)
  - Assemblymember: Lori Wilson (D)
  - U. S. rep.: Mike Thompson (D)

Area
  - Total: 7.20 sq mi (18.64 km^{2})
  - Land: 7.10 sq mi (18.39 km^{2})
  - Water: 0.097 sq mi (0.25 km^{2}) 1.34%
- Elevation: 62 ft (19 m)

Population (2020)
  - Total: 18,988
  - Density: 2,674.2/sq mi (1,032.53/km^{2})
- Time zone: UTC-08:00 (PST)
  - Summer (DST): UTC-07:00 (PDT)
- ZIP code: 95620
- Area code: 707, 369
- FIPS code: 06-19402
- GNIS feature IDs: 1655973, 2410343
- Website: cityofdixonca.gov

Dixon is a city in northeastern Solano County, California, United States, located 23 miles (37 km) from the state capital, Sacramento. It has a hot-summer mediterranean climate on the Köppen climate classification scale. Its population was 18,988 at the 2020 United States census. Other nearby cities include Vacaville, Winters, Davis, Woodland, and Rio Vista.

== History ==
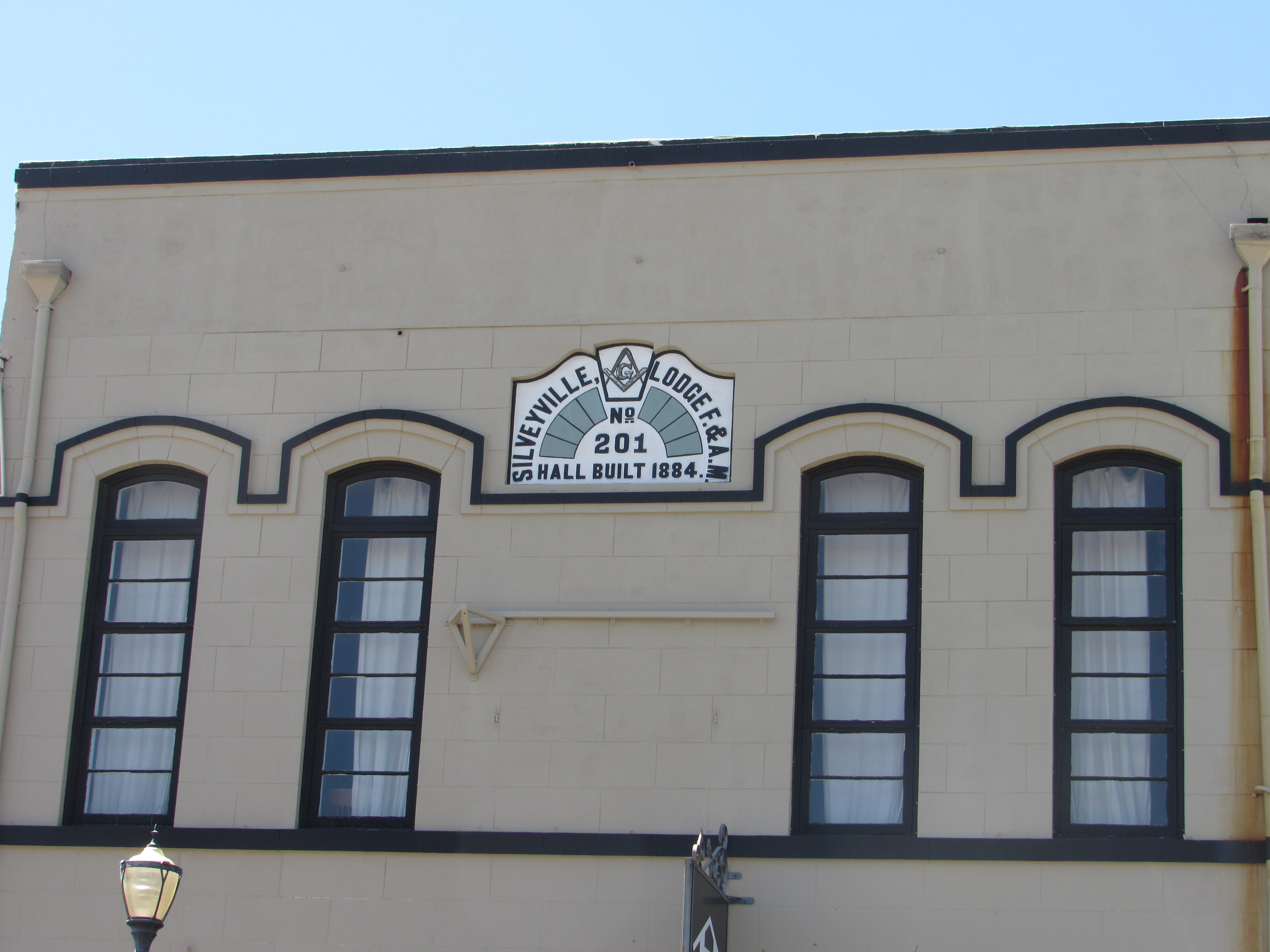
Silveyville Masons Lodge 201 built in 1884 in Dixon, California

The first semi-permanent European settlement to develop in the Dixon area emerged during the California Gold Rush of the mid-19th century when the community of Silveyville was founded in 1852 by Elijah Silvey as a halfway point between the Pacific coast and the rich gold fields of Sacramento along a route commonly traveled by miners. In 1868, Central Pacific Railroad came through the area and missed Silveyville by a few miles. As a result, local leaders decided to physically relocate Silveyville closer to the tracks in order to enjoy the benefits of commerce and travel. One of the first buildings that still stands in Dixon from the 1871 move is the Dixon Methodist Church located at 209 N. Jefferson Street.

Originally, the city was named "Dicksville" after Thomas Dickson who donated 10 acres of his land for the construction of a railroad depot following the completion of the tracks and subsequent relocation of Silveyville to the now-Dixon area. However, when the first rail shipment of merchandise arrived from San Francisco in 1872, it was mistakenly addressed to "Dixon"—a name that has been used since, mainly out of simplicity. Up to now, the urban landscape of the town can be seen to have developed mostly in between the railroad tracks and Interstate-80.

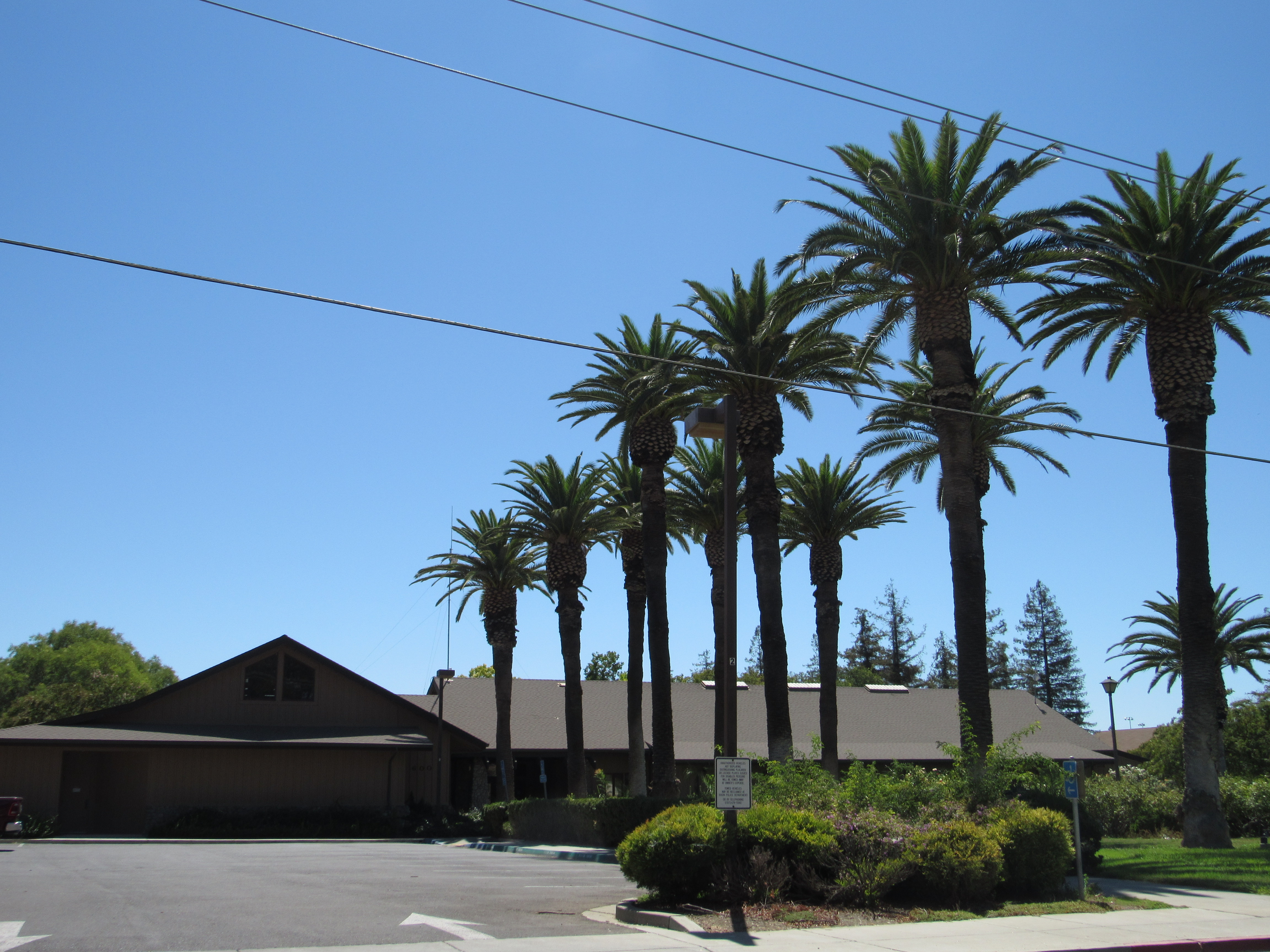
Dixon City Hall

As of 2024 the Dixon city council consists of Steve Bird, Mayor, Jim Ernest, representing District 1, Thom Bogue, representing District 2, Kevin Johnson, representing District 3, and Don Hendershot, representing District 4.

The city operates a municipal police and fire department, and water system & wastewater treatment plant.

== Geography ==
Dixon is located at 38°26′57″N 121°49′37″W (38.449108, -121.826872).

According to the United States Census Bureau, the city has a total area of 7.2 square miles (19 km^{2}), of which 7.1 square miles (18 km^{2}) is land and 0.1 square miles (0.26 km^{2}) (1.34%) is water.

== Demographics ==
Historical population
Census	Pop.	Note	%±
1870	317		—
1890	1,082		—
1900	788		−27.2%
1910	827		4.9%
1920	926		12.0%
1930	1,000		8.0%
1940	1,108		10.8%
1950	1,714		54.7%
1960	2,970		73.3%
1970	4,432		49.2%
1980	7,541		70.1%
1990	10,401		37.9%
2000	16,103		54.8%
2010	18,351		14.0%
2020	18,988		3.5%
2025 (est.)	21,116	▲	11.2%
U.S. Decennial Census

=== 2020 census ===
As of the 2020 census, Dixon had a population of 18,988. The population density was 2,674.4 inhabitants per square mile (1,032.6/km^{2}). The median age was 37.0 years, with 24.7% of residents under the age of 18, 8.9% aged 18 to 24, 27.1% aged 25 to 44, 25.4% aged 45 to 64, and 14.0% aged 65 or older. For every 100 females, there were 97.1 males, and for every 100 females age 18 and over, there were 94.2 males age 18 and over.

Racial composition as of the 2020 census
Race	Number	Percent
White	9,776	51.5%
Black or African American	590	3.1%
American Indian and Alaska Native	307	1.6%
Asian	685	3.6%
Native Hawaiian and Other Pacific Islander	94	0.5%
Some other race	4,384	23.1%
Two or more races	3,152	16.6%
Hispanic or Latino (of any race)	8,302	43.7%

The census reported that 100.0% of the population lived in households, 4 people (0.0%) lived in non-institutionalized group quarters, and no one was institutionalized. There were 6,374 households, of which 40.0% had children under the age of 18 living in them. Of all households, 56.1% were married-couple households, 7.5% were cohabiting couple households, 13.6% had a male householder with no spouse or partner present, and 22.9% had a female householder with no spouse or partner present. About 17.6% of households were made up of individuals, and 8.6% had someone living alone who was 65 years of age or older. The average household size was 2.98, and there were 4,846 families (76.0% of all households).

There were 6,554 housing units at an average density of 923.1 units per square mile (356.4 units/km^{2}). Of all housing units, 2.7% were vacant. Of occupied units, 65.9% were owner-occupied and 34.1% were occupied by renters. The homeowner vacancy rate was 0.6%, and the rental vacancy rate was 3.3%.

99.4% of residents lived in urban areas, while 0.6% lived in rural areas.

=== 2023 ACS estimates ===
In 2023, the US Census Bureau estimated that 17.2% of the population were foreign-born. Of all people aged 5 or older, 67.2% spoke only English at home, 28.2% spoke Spanish, 2.6% spoke other Indo-European languages, and 2.0% spoke Asian or Pacific Islander languages. Of those aged 25 or older, 83.9% were high school graduates and 24.3% had a bachelor's degree.

The median household income was $98,798, and the per capita income was $42,163. About 7.2% of families and 8.4% of the population were below the poverty line.

=== 2010 census ===
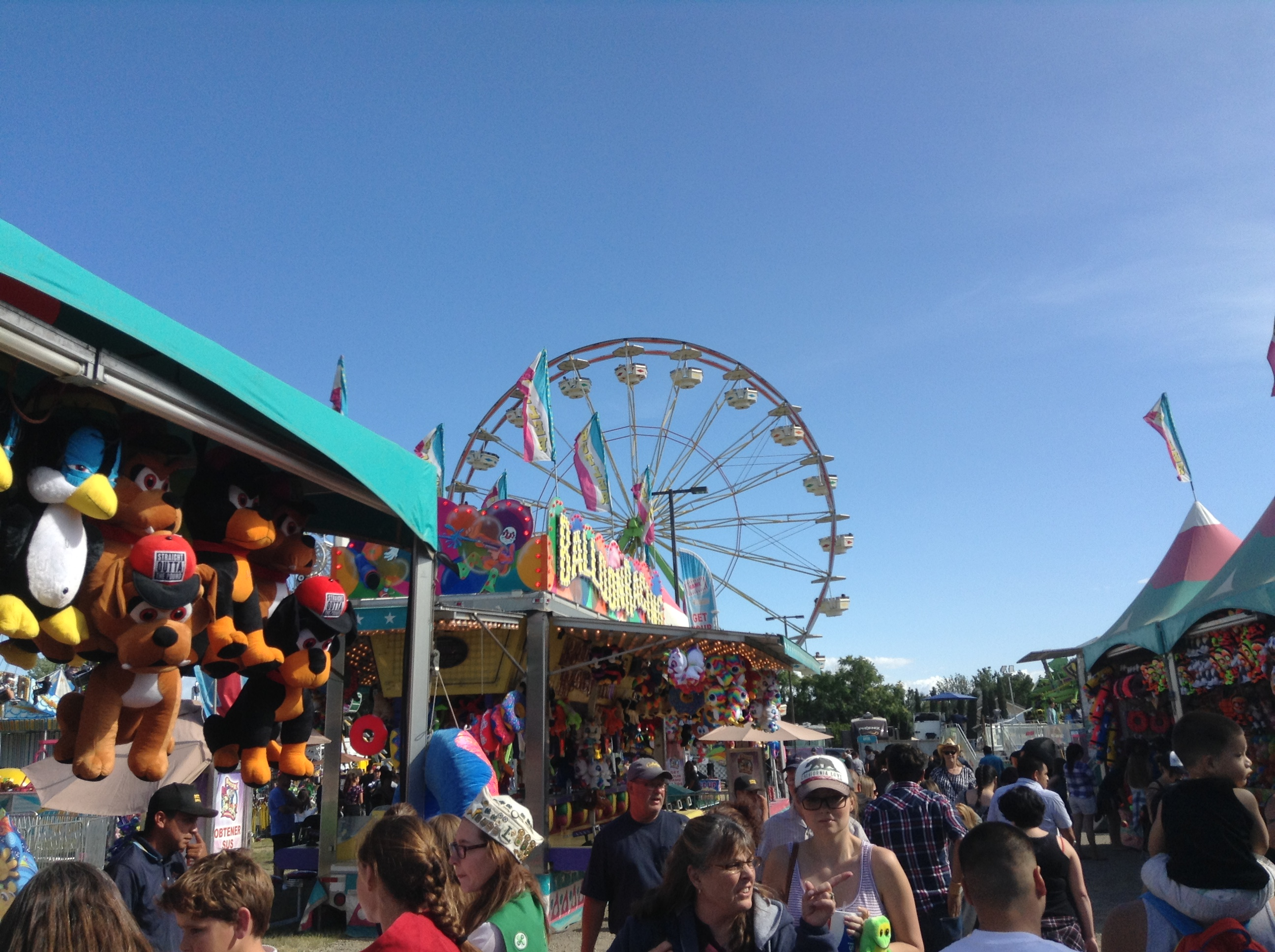
Midway at the Dixon May Fair

The 2010 United States census reported that Dixon had a population of 18,351. The population density was 2,587.7 inhabitants per square mile (999.1/km^{2}). The racial makeup of Dixon was 13,023 (71.0%) White, 562 (3.1%) African American, 184 (1.0%) Native American, 671 (3.7%) Asian, 58 (0.3%) Pacific Islander, 2,838 (15.5%) from other races, and 1,015 (5.5%) from two or more races. Hispanic or Latino of any race were 7,426 persons (40.5%).

The Census reported that 100% of the population lived in households.

There were 5,856 households, out of which 2,773 (47.4%) had children under the age of 18 living in them, 3,550 (60.6%) were opposite-sex married couples living together, 790 (13.5%) had a female householder with no husband present, 339 (5.8%) had a male householder with no wife present. There were 327 (5.6%) unmarried opposite-sex partnerships, and 26 (0.4%) same-sex married couples or partnerships. 867 households (14.8%) were made up of individuals, and 301 (5.1%) had someone living alone who was 65 years of age or older. The average household size was 3.13. There were 4,679 families (79.9% of all households); the average family size was 3.47.

The population was spread out, with 5,349 people (29.1%) under the age of 18, 1,816 people (9.9%) aged 18 to 24, 5,026 people (27.4%) aged 25 to 44, 4,608 people (25.1%) aged 45 to 64, and 1,552 people (8.5%) who were 65 years of age or older. The median age was 33.3 years. For every 100 females, there were 97.8 males. For every 100 females age 18 and over, there were 94.8 males.

There were 6,172 housing units at an average density of 870.3 units per square mile (336.0 units/km^{2}), of which 3,902 (66.6%) were owner-occupied, and 1,954 (33.4%) were occupied by renters. The homeowner vacancy rate was 2.0%; the rental vacancy rate was 5.2%. 12,149 people (66.2% of the population) lived in owner-occupied housing units and 6,201 people (33.8%) lived in rental housing units.

== Notable sites ==
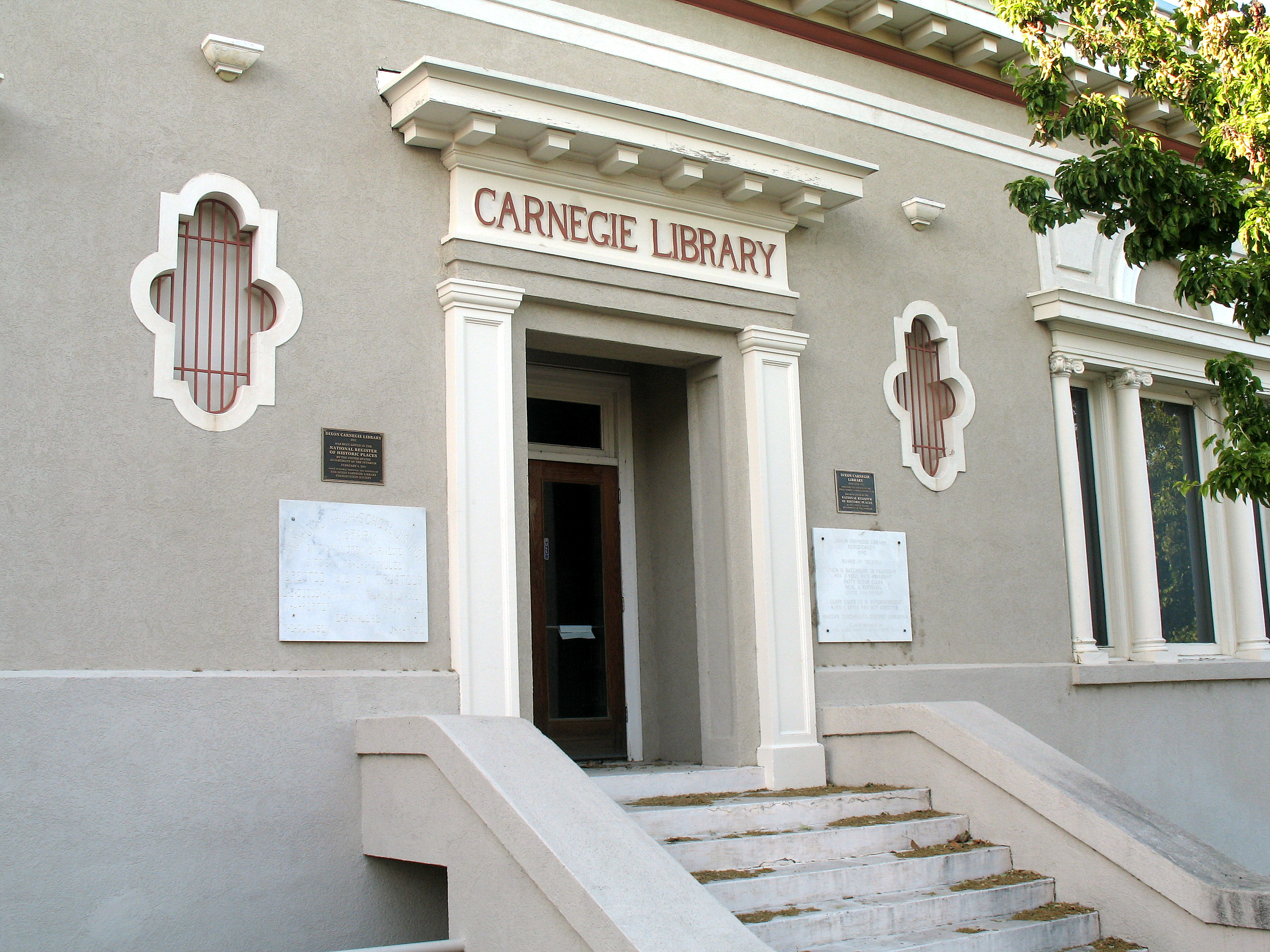
Dixon Carnegie Library

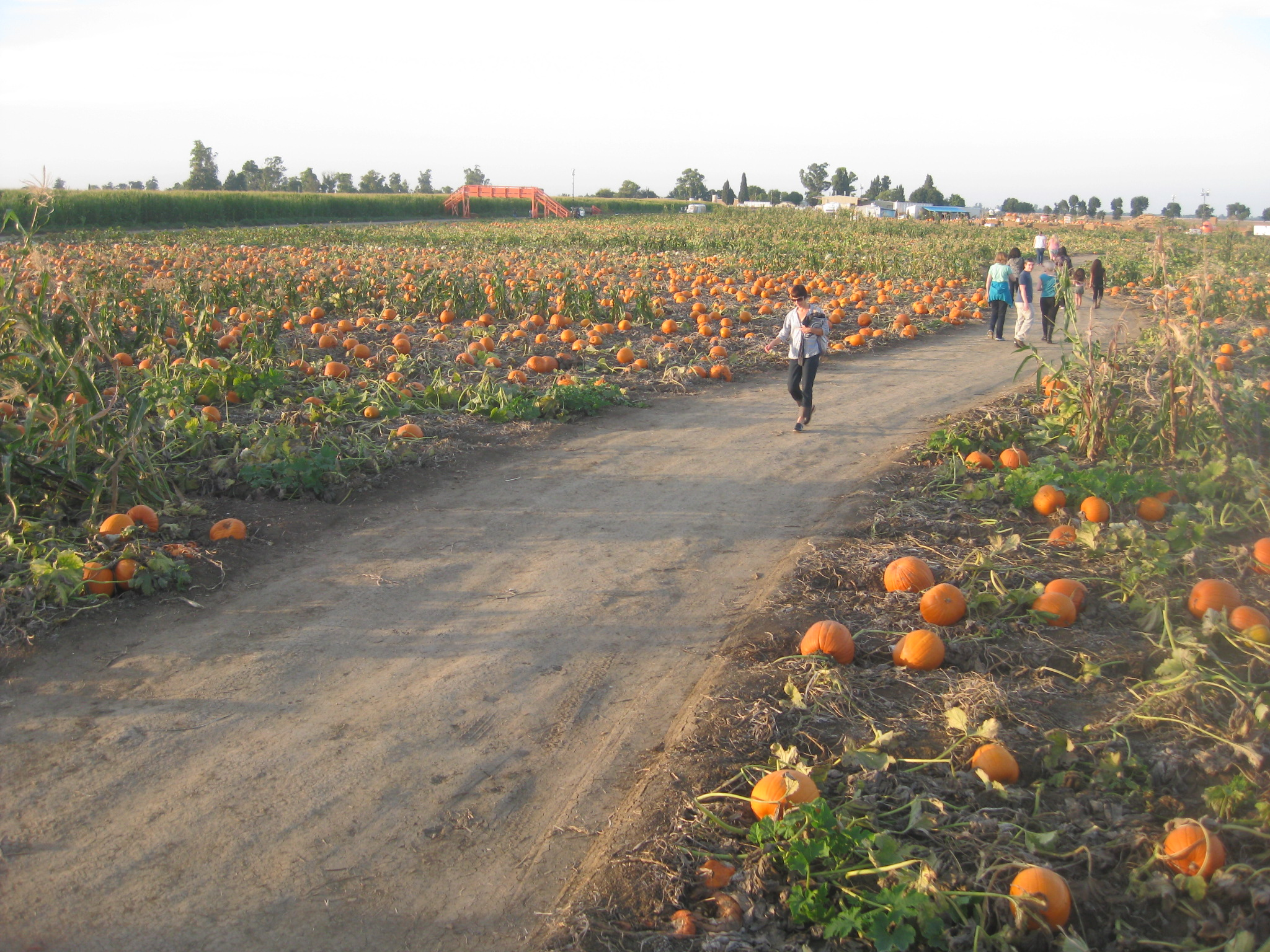
Part of the Dixon pumpkin patch.

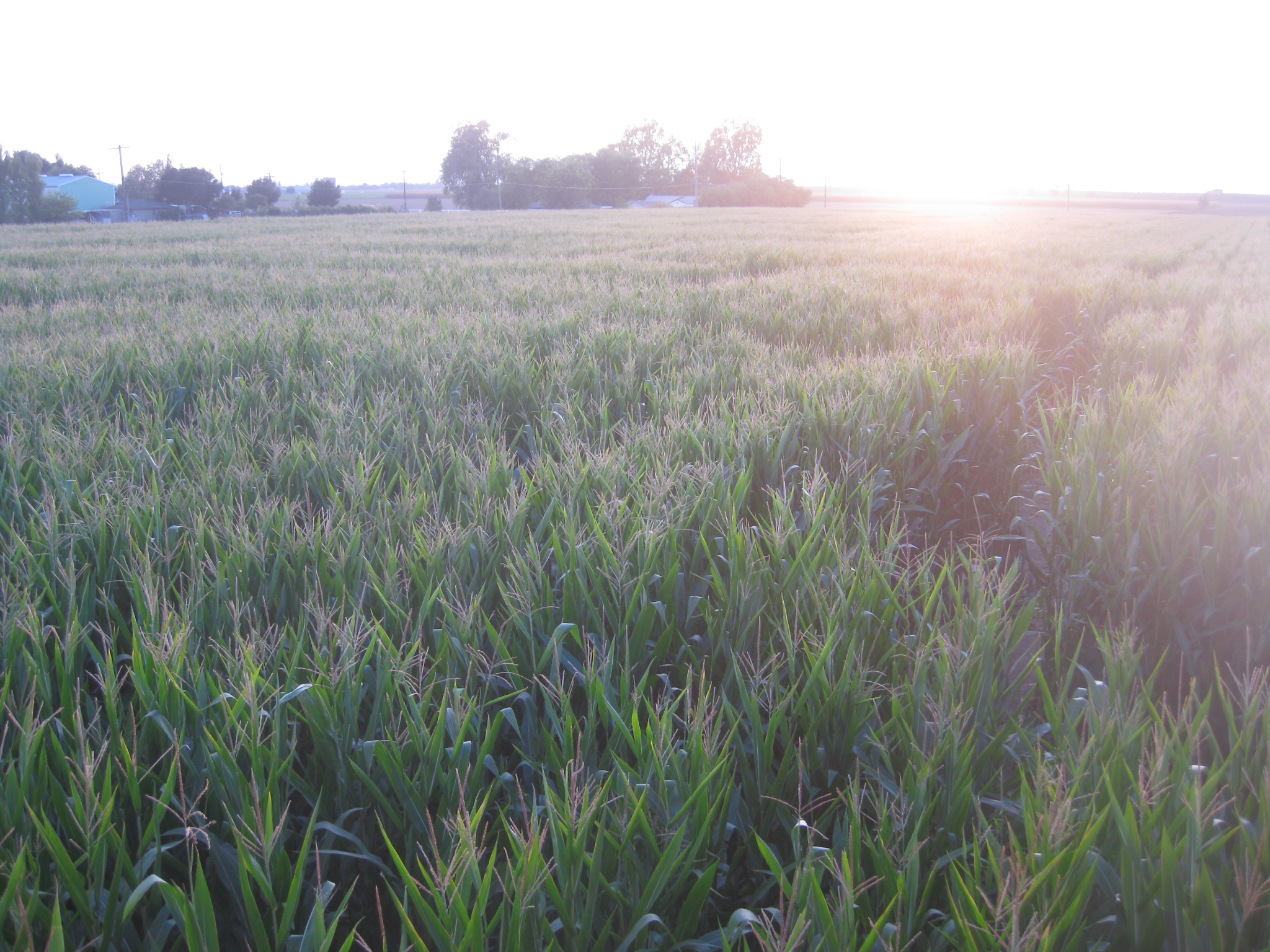
Part of the Dixon World Record corn maze.

The Jackson Fay Brown House and the Dixon Carnegie library are on the National Register of Historic Places.

As of 2014, Dixon residents Matt and Mark Cooley, owners of Cool Patch Pumpkins, hold the Guinness World Record for "largest maze, temporary corn/crop maze". The maze measured 163,853.83 m^{2} or 40.489 acres. In 2012, Cool Patch Pumpkins broke its own record with a 53-acre maze. In 2014 Cool Patch Pumpkins again broke its own record by growing a 60-acre maze.

A Milk Farm Restaurant sign, measuring 100 feet tall, was built in May 1963 and still stands today at the intersection of State Route 113 and Interstate 80.

Dixon is home to the Dixon May Fair, California's oldest fair. The fair began in 1885 as a May Day celebration and predates the Solano County Fair which first occurred in 1949. A stage on the fairground was named in honor of country singer Jon Pardi, who grew up in Dixon.

== Notable people ==
- Spencer Webb - was a tight end for the Oregon Ducks
- Jon Pardi - Country music singer and songwriter
- Nick Watney - Professional golfer
- Dave Ball - Professional NFL player
- Espinoza Paz - Mexican musician and composer
- Joe Craven - Professional musician and music educator
- Keith Ruiz - Professional toy seller

== Transportation ==
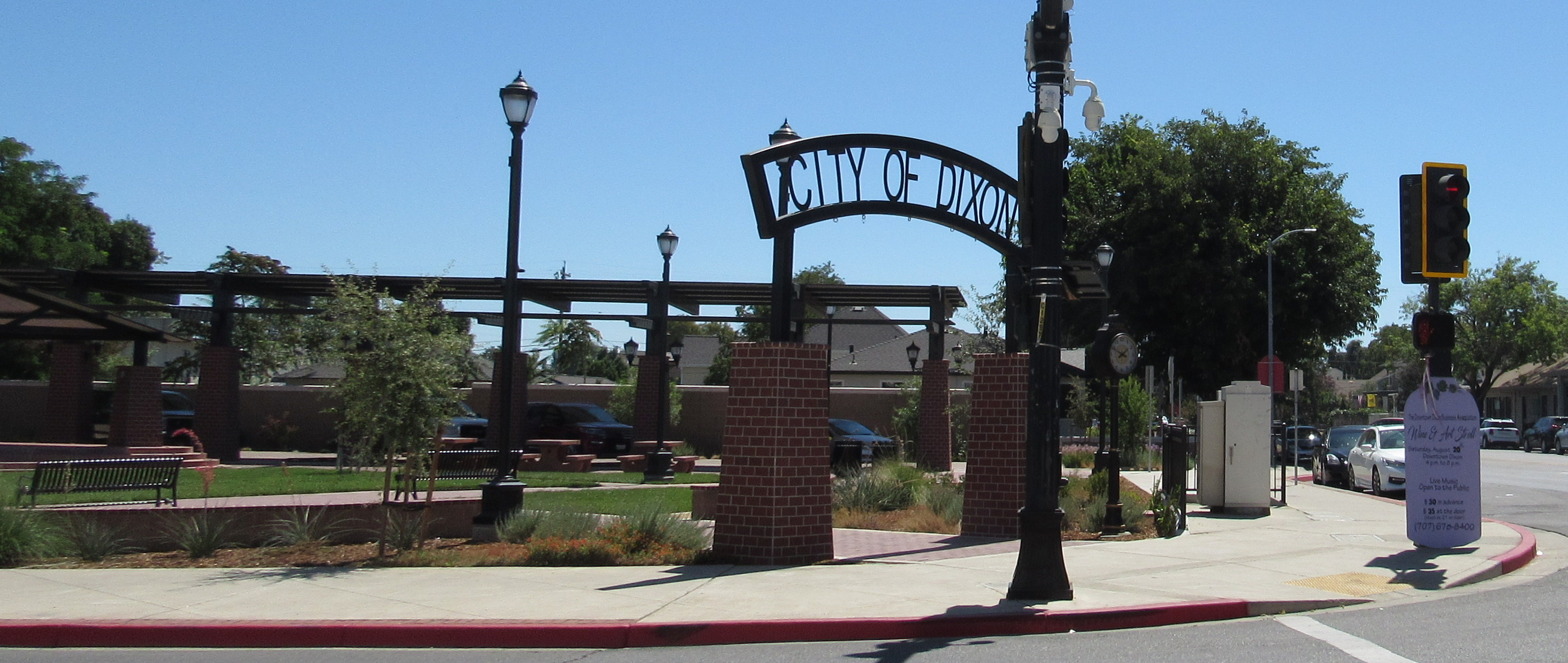
Dixon Arch in downtown along California State Route 113

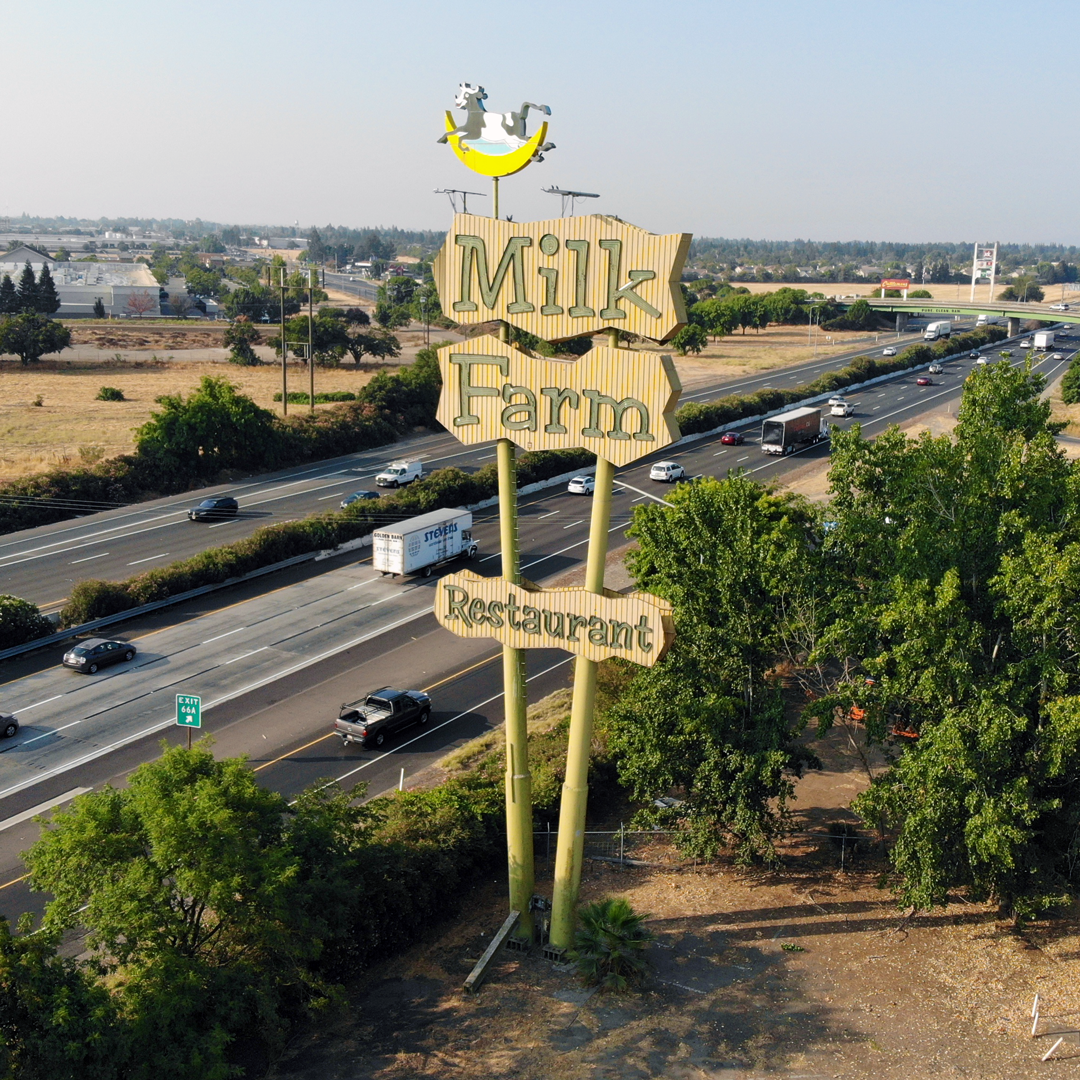
Milk Farm Sign along Interstate 80 in Dixon

Interstate 80 and California State Route 113 pass through Dixon.

The Union Pacific Railroad mainline between Oakland and Sacramento also passes through Dixon. This line was owned by Southern Pacific Railroad until its merger with Union Pacific on September 11, 1996. The track was constructed in 1868 by the California Pacific Railroad.

Amtrak Capitol Corridor also passes through Dixon over the UP mainline but the nearest station stops are at Davis and Fairfield–Vacaville. Amtrak's California Zephyr and Coast Starlight also pass through Dixon without stopping.

In 2006, the City of Dixon finished construction on a train station near downtown Dixon. However, there are currently no scheduled stops at the station. The building has, for the time being, been converted to the city's Chamber of Commerce.

The Dixon Readi-Ride is a dial-a-ride shuttlebus service. The Dixon Park & Ride serves Fairfield and Suisun Transit route 30 which runs between Fairfield Transportation Center and downtown Sacramento. The Dixon Readi-Ride a dial-a-ride service also stops here. It has 89 parking spots. The bus service runs approximately 10 hours per day on route 30.

== Economy ==
=== Top employers ===
According to the city's 2022 Annual Comprehensive Financial Report, the top employers in the city are:

#	Employer	# of Employees
1	Dixon Unified School District	346
2	Walmart	300
3	Cardinal Health	250
4	Basalite	193
5	Altec Industries	190
6	Dixon Canning (Campbell's)	182
7	Superior Packing	164
8	City of Dixon	156
9	Gold Star Foods	99
10	First Northern Bank	74

Dixon was the home of the Gymboree Corporation's only distribution center prior to the bankruptcy and closing of the company in 2019.

== Media ==
The Dixon Independent Voice was founded in 1993 (first as The Dixon Newspaper) and is the main paper of circulation today. It is published weekly and is owned by Messenger Publishing Group. The Dixon Tribune newspaper was founded November 14, 1874, but ceased publication after its January 31, 2024 issue.

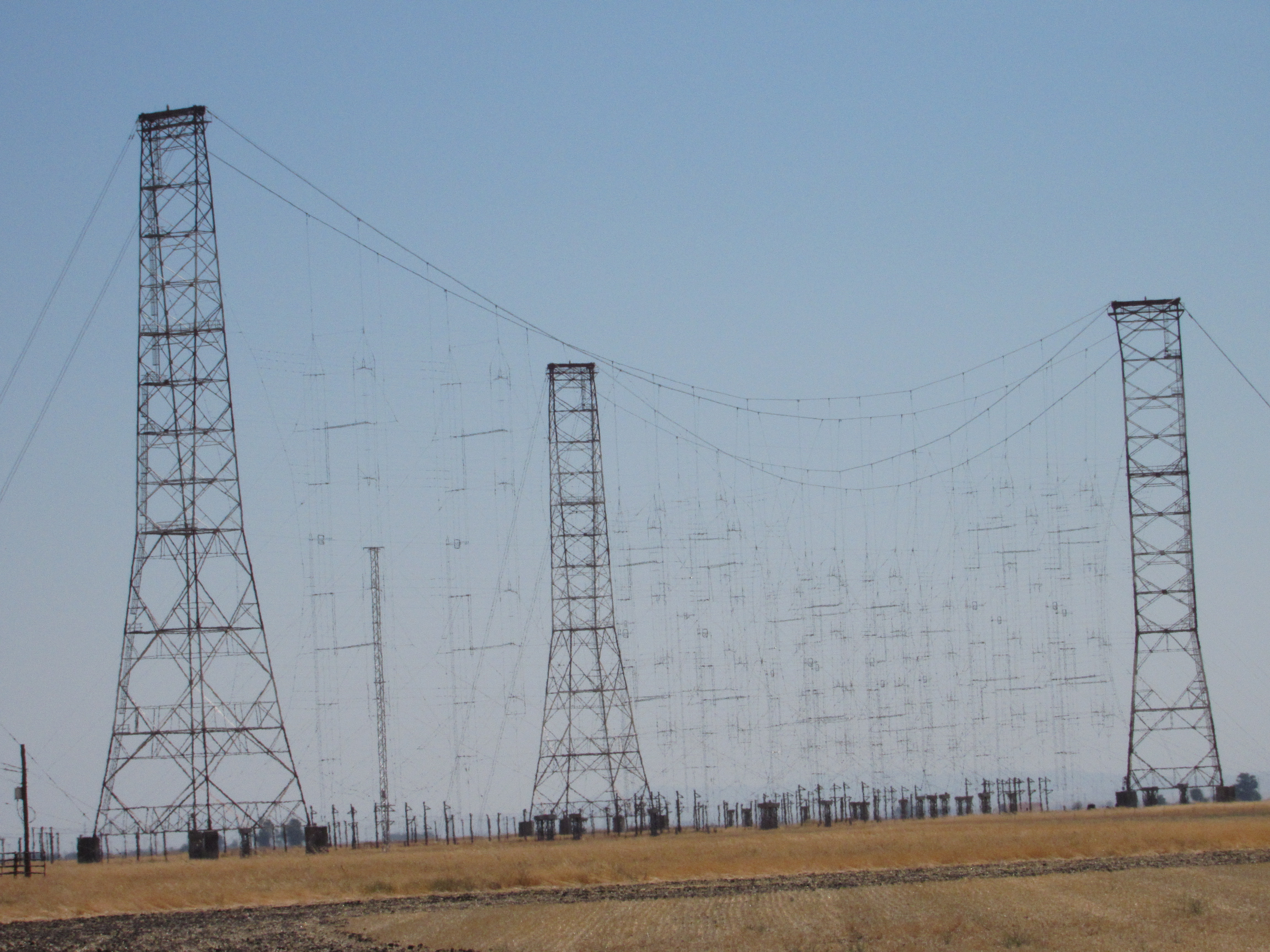
Voice of America Transmitters

Historically, the Voice of America ran a shortwave transmitter site that was formerly owned and operated by NBC. NBC built the site in 1944, and it broadcast under the call signs KNBA, KNBH, KNBI, KNBC, and KNBX. The station was closed between September 2, 1979, and October 1, 1983, and briefly reopened for Spanish language broadcasting until 1988. The station served as a relay to both NBC International programming overseas, and as a relay of KNBR and its programming overseas, mostly the Pacific area. There is also a military transmission site, the Dixon Naval Radio Transmitter Facility.

== Education ==
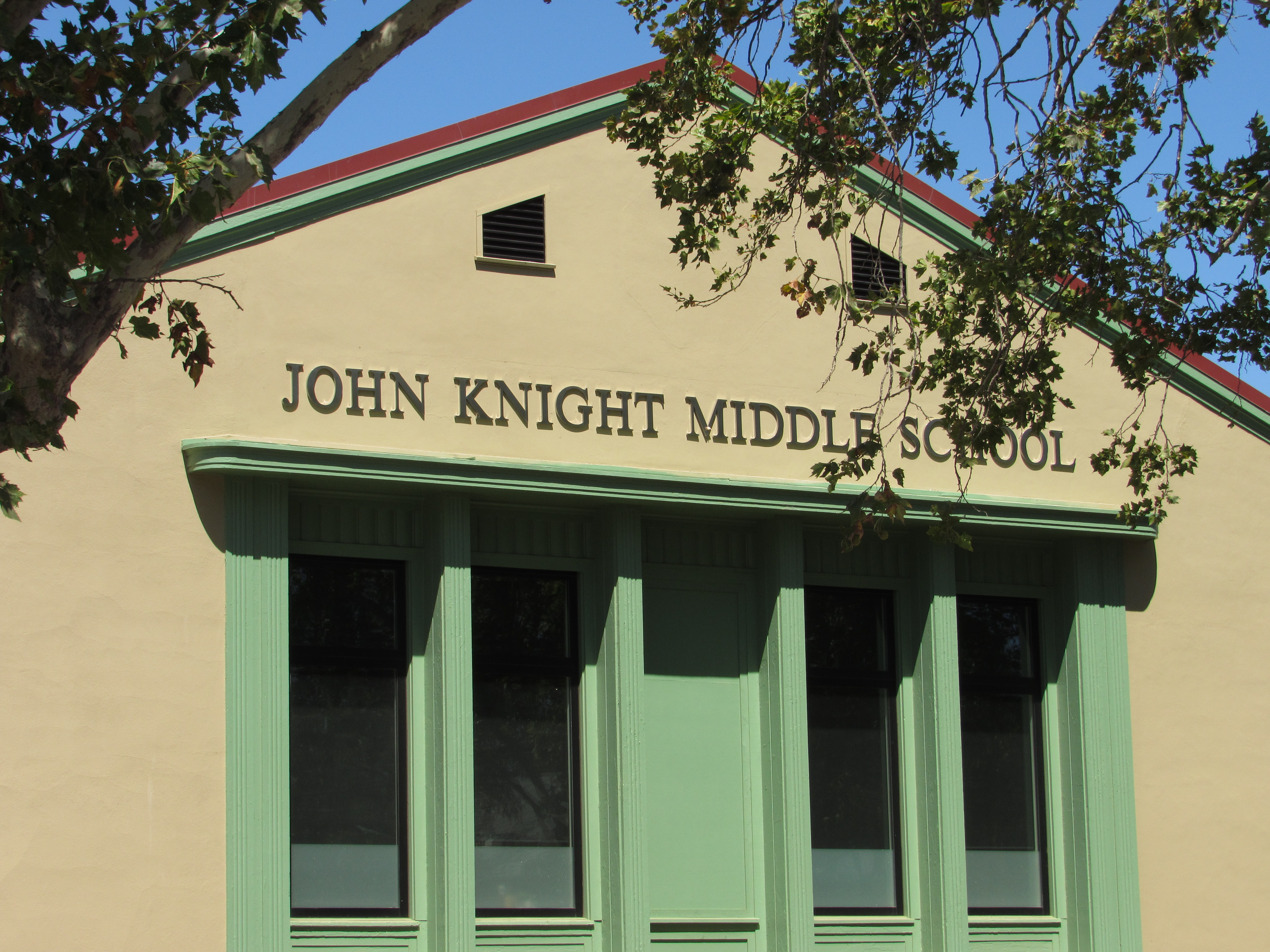
John Knight Middle School

Dixon is served by the Dixon Unified School District, and also has a few private educational institutions.

High schools

- Dixon High School
- Maine Prairie High School (continuation school)

Middle schools

- Dixon Montessori Charter School
- John Knight Middle School (formerly known as C.A. Jacobs Middle School)
- Neighborhood Christian Middle School

Elementary schools

- Silveyville (closed as of 2008)
- Anderson
- Gretchen Higgins
- Tremont
- Neighborhood Christian School
- Dixon Montessori Charter School (now located in Silveyville facility)
- Easter Seals Special Education Center (shares Silveyville facility with DMCS)
