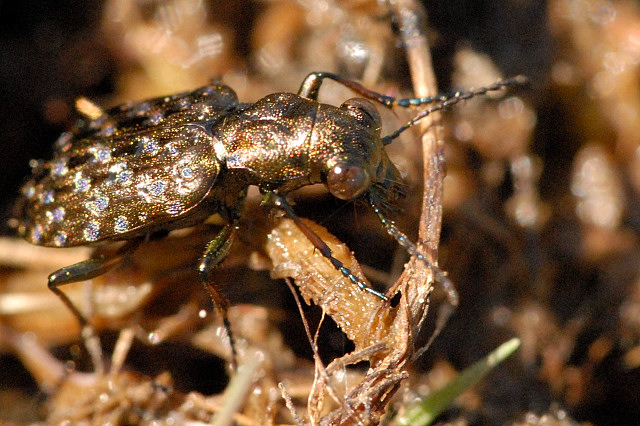

Scientific classification
- Kingdom: Animalia
- Phylum: Arthropoda
- Clade: Pancrustacea
- Class: Insecta
- Order: Coleoptera
- Suborder: Adephaga
- Family: Carabidae
- Genus: Elaphrus
- Species: E. riparius

Binomial name
- Elaphrus riparius (Linnaeus, 1758)

= Elaphrus riparius =

Species of beetle

Elaphrus riparius is a species of ground beetle native to the Palearctic and the Near East. In Europe, it is found in Austria, Belarus, Belgium, Great Britain including Shetland, Orkney, Hebrides and Isle of Man, Bulgaria, Croatia, the Czech Republic, mainland Denmark, Estonia, Finland, mainland France, Germany, Hungary, Republic of Ireland, mainland Italy (doubtful), Kaliningrad, Latvia, Liechtenstein, Lithuania, Luxembourg, Northern Ireland, mainland Norway, Poland, Russia, Slovakia, Slovenia, mainland Spain, Sweden, Switzerland, the Netherlands, Ukraine and Yugoslavia.
