= Jepson Prairie =

Remnant natural prairie in the Sacramento Valley of the U.S. state of California

Coordinates: 38.27°N 121.82°W

Jepson Prairie Preserve
- IUCN category V (protected landscape/seascape)
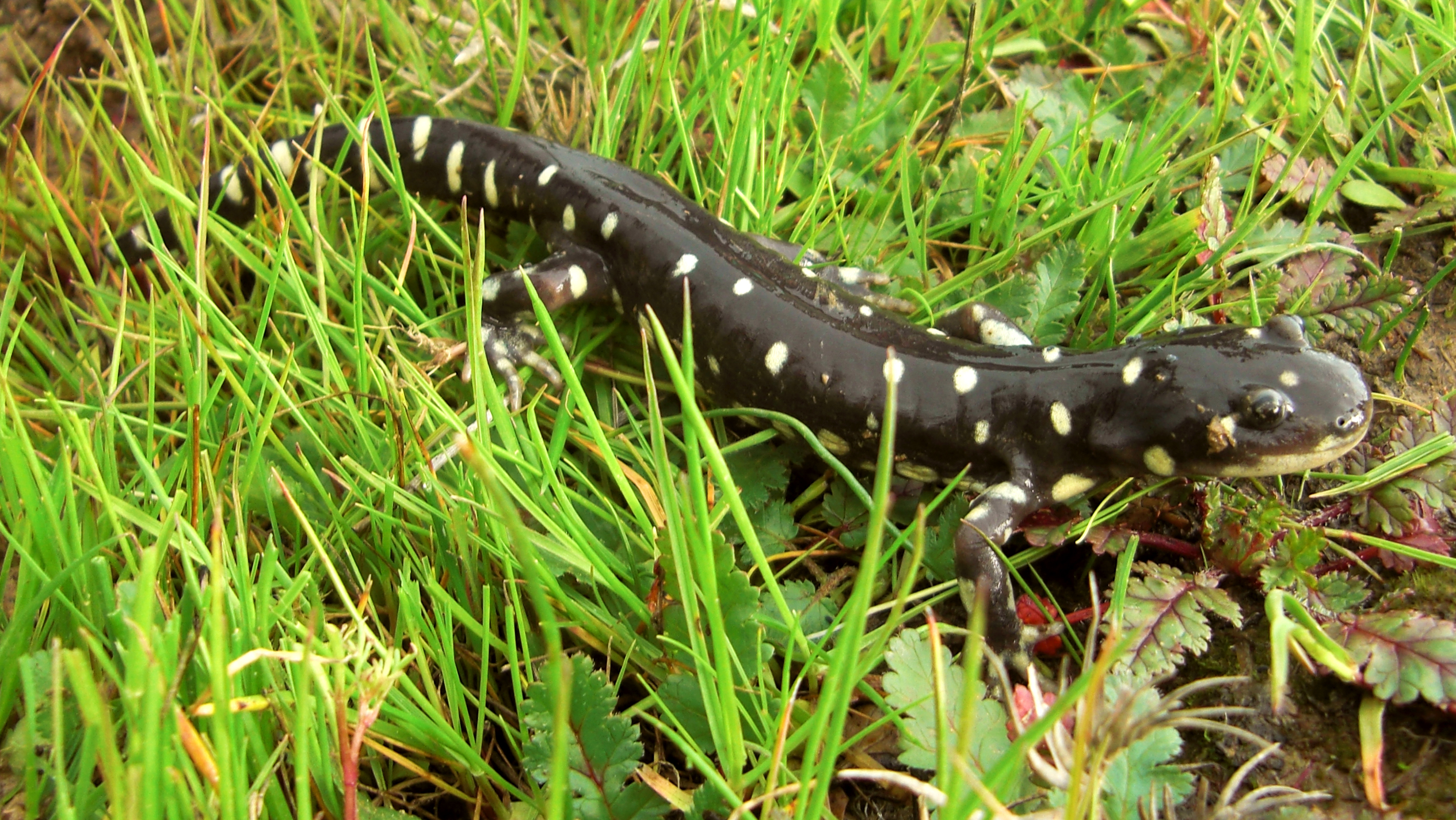
- California tiger salamander (Ambystoma californiense) at Jepson Prairie Preserve
- Interactive map of Jepson Prairie Preserve
- Area: 636 ha (1,570 acres)
- Designation: preserve
- Designated: 1997

Jepson Prairie, also known as the Jepson Prairie preserve, is a natural preserve in the Sacramento Valley in Solano County, California, that protects a remnant natural prairie and seasonal wetlands surrounded by agricultural land. It contains some of the most intact claypan vernal pool habitat left in the Central Valley, including Olcott Lake, a large seasonal playa pool at the preserve's lowest point. The preserve covers about 6.36 square kilometers (2.46 square mi) and supports several rare and endangered species, including the California tiger salamander and the Delta green ground beetle, which is found only in the Jepson Prairie area.

The Nature Conservancy purchased the land in 1980, and the preserve was dedicated in 1982 in honor of botanist Willis Linn Jepson, who first documented the area’s vernal pool plants in 1892. It joined the University of California Natural Reserve System in 1983 and was designated a National Natural Landmark in 1987. Since 1997, the preserve has been owned by the Solano Land Trust, while The Nature Conservancy holds a conservation easement and the University of California, Davis manages research and education at the site.

== History ==
Botanist Willis Linn Jepson was the first to document the area’s vernal pool plants in 1892. By the 1950s, scientists recognized that, of the roughly 13 million acres of grassland that once covered California, very little remained. Because University of California researchers had conducted fieldwork in the Jepson Prairie area for many years and understood its value as a habitat for rare species, the increasingly scarce undisturbed vernal pools became a point of concern.

On December 31, 1980, The Nature Conservancy bought 1,566 acres from the Southern Pacific Railroad. This purchase included Olcott Lake, the largest vernal pool at Jepson Prairie, and its surrounding bunchgrass prairie. The property was formally dedicated as the Willis Linn Jepson Prairie Preserve in 1982. In 1983, a cooperative use agreement brought the preserve into the University of California Natural Reserve System. In 1987, the National Park Service designated it as a National Natural Landmark. The Nature Conservancy transferred ownership to the Solano Land Trust in 1997, while keeping a conservation easement that requires the land to be protected permanently for its native species.

== Habitats ==
The Jepson Prairie Preserve hosts different habitat types including vernal pools, native grasslands, and seasonal wetlands. Each supports the distinct native plant community.

A key feature of the prairie are vernal pools which are temporary bodies of water. Vernal pools form when there is an impermeable layer of soil that prevents rainwater from draining into the ground. At the Jepson Prairie, this layer consists of claypan soil formed from deposits nearly 60,000 to 100,000 years old. The claypan lies about one to two feet below surface level, and also forms the bottom of Olcott Lake, the preserve’s largest vernal pool. Olcott Lake is a large seasonal playa pool at the center of the preserve. Its shallow basin fills during the wet season and dries during the summer, providing habitat for specialized vernal pool species.

Vernal pools typically fill with rainwater during the winter and gradually dry out during the warmer summer months. This seasonal cycle creates alternating periods of flooding and drought in which native species and plants have adapted. Many vernal plants are annuals, meaning they grow and flower during the wetter months before producing seeds and dying as the pools dry.

Jepson Prairie protects vernal pool habitats, but grasslands are another prevalent habitat which is also the most extensive. Although the preserve retains areas of native bunchgrass prairie, its grasslands have changed considerably since European and American settlement where the habitat consisted of spring flowers. Since then, about 90% of the Prairie has changed from its original habitat and non-native grasses originating from Mediterranean regions were introduced. With this, livestock and the grasses spread throughout the landscape, replacing much of the region’s original grassland vegetation.

The Jepson Prairie Preserve’s grasslands also support native wildflowers, including several species associated with vernal pool and prairie ecosystems. The combination of grasslands and seasonal wetland create a variety of growing conditions that support distinct plant communities.

== Flora ==
Jepson Prairie supports a diverse range of native plants including rare species that have adapted to its vernal pools and grasslands. Vernal pool plants have adapted to seasonal conditions through features such as hollow stems that transport air to their roots, the ability to absorb gases directly from water, and floating leaves. Spring wildflowers such as Popcornflower (Plagiobothrys stipitatus), Fringed Downingia (Downingia concolor), and meadowfoam (Limnanthes douglasii ssp. rosea) typically bloom between March and May. With over 200 vernal pool plants, over half are entirely found in Jepson Prairie. In the grasslands, wildflowers such as Smooth Tidytips and Gold Nuggets can be found during the spring time.

Rare plants found in the preserve include Boggs lake hedge hyssop, Baker’s navarretia, Suisun march aster, alkali milkvetch, and dwarf downingia. The preserve also supports Solano grass (Tuctoria mucronata), a federally listed endangered species from Olcott Lake.

== Fauna ==
The preserve also provides habitat for a variety of diverse organisms. In the vernal pools, migratory waterfowl, wading birds, and varying wildlife can be found in the ever changing environmental conditions. Its seasonal wetlands support specialized invertebrates including the vernal pool fairy shrimp (Branchinecta lynchi), vernal pool tadpole shrimp (Lepidurus packardi), and conservancy fairy shrimp (Branchinecta conservatio). The conservancy fairy shrimp was first described from Jepson Prairie. The conservancy fairy shrimp was first described from Jepson Prairie and the vernal pool tadpole shrimp were found in the prairie’s largest playa pools.

Another notable species is the California tiger salamander (Ambystoma californiense). The California tiger salamander migrates between breeding ponds and surrounding terrestrial habitats. In order to survive to California's dry summers, California Tiger Salamanders live underground in Botta's Pocket Gopher burrows. This helps them stay moist until the fall rains, where they move into the lakes during the evening to mate and lay eggs. As pools dry in the spring, the larvae undergo metamorphosis into salamanders, repeating the process.

The Delta green ground beetle (Elaphrus viridis) is another threatened species that is restricted to the Jepson Prairie area and neighboring areas. From January to May, the beetles live along Olcott Lake, although knowledge about their life cycle is limited. Native pollinators, including specialist bees, also visit vernal pool flowers, contributing to the preserve’s biodiversity.
