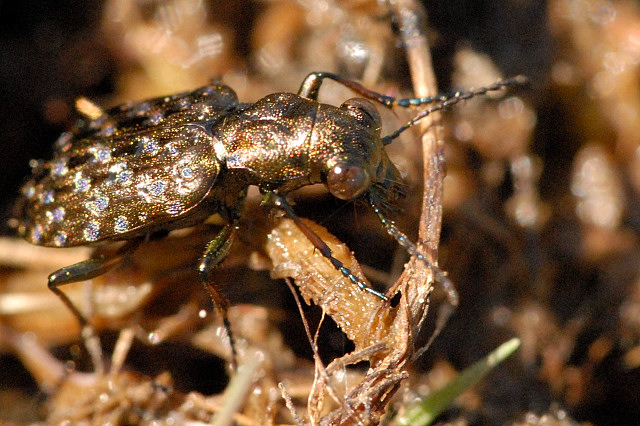
- Elaphrus riparius

Scientific classification
- Kingdom: Animalia
- Phylum: Arthropoda
- Clade: Pancrustacea
- Class: Insecta
- Order: Coleoptera
- Suborder: Adephaga
- Family: Carabidae
- Subfamily: Elaphrinae
- Genus: Elaphrus; Fabricius, 1775

Subgenera
- Arctelaphrus Semenov, 1926; Elaphroterus Semenov, 1896; Elaphrus Fabricius, 1775; Neoelaphrus Hatch, 1951; Sinoelaphrus Shi & Liang, 2008

= Elaphrus =

Genus of ground beetle

Elaphrus is a genus in the beetle family Carabidae. There are at least 40 described species in Elaphrus.

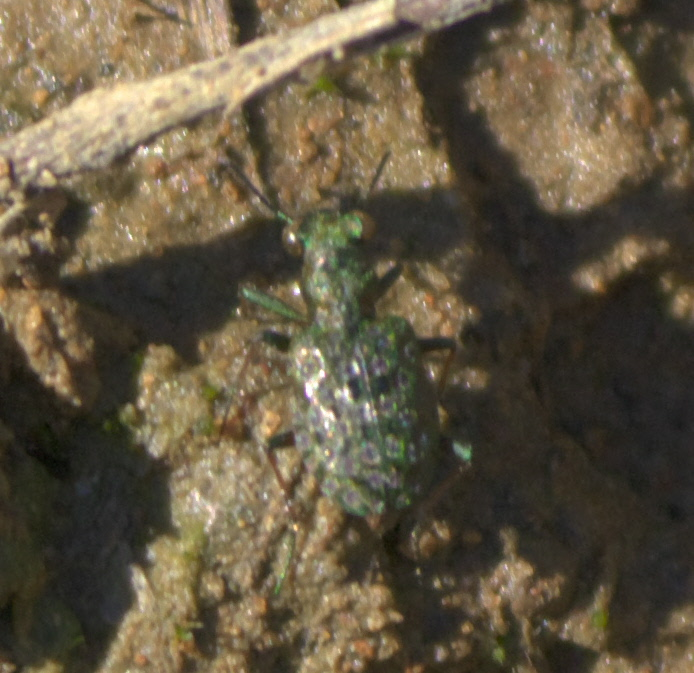
Elaphrus

== Species ==
These 40 species belong to the genus Elaphrus:

- Elaphrus americanus Dejean, 1831
- Elaphrus angulonotus Shi & Liang, 2008
- Elaphrus angusticollis R.F.Sahlberg, 1844
- Elaphrus aureus P.Müller, 1821
- Elaphrus californicus Mannerheim, 1843
- Elaphrus cicatricosus LeConte, 1847
- Elaphrus citharus Goulet & Smetana, 1997
- Elaphrus clairvillei Kirby, 1837
- Elaphrus comatus Goulet, 1983
- Elaphrus cupreus Duftschmid, 1812
- Elaphrus finitimus Casey, 1920
- Elaphrus fuliginosus Say, 1830
- Elaphrus hypocrita Semenov, 1926
- Elaphrus japonicus Ueno, 1954
- Elaphrus laevigatus LeConte, 1852
- Elaphrus lapponicus Gyllenhal, 1810
- Elaphrus lecontei Crotch, 1876
- Elaphrus lheritieri Antoine, 1947
- Elaphrus lindrothi Goulet, 1983
- Elaphrus marginicollis Goulet, 1983
- Elaphrus mimus Goulet, 1983
- Elaphrus olivaceus LeConte, 1863
- Elaphrus potanini Semenov, 1889
- Elaphrus punctatus Motschulsky, 1844
- Elaphrus purpurans Hausen, 1891
- Elaphrus pyrenoeus Motschulsky, 1850
- Elaphrus riparius (Linnaeus, 1758)
- Elaphrus ruscarius Say, 1830
- Elaphrus sibiricus Motschulsky, 1844
- Elaphrus smaragdiceps Semenov, 1889
- Elaphrus splendidus Fischer von Waldheim, 1828
- Elaphrus sugai Nakane, 1987
- Elaphrus tibetanus Semenov, 1904
- Elaphrus trossulus Semenov, 1904
- Elaphrus tuberculatus Mäklin, 1878
- Elaphrus uliginosus Fabricius, 1792
- Elaphrus ullrichii W.Redtenbacher, 1842
- Elaphrus viridis G.Horn, 1878
- Elaphrus weissi Dostal, 1996
- † Elaphrus irregularis Scudder, 1890
