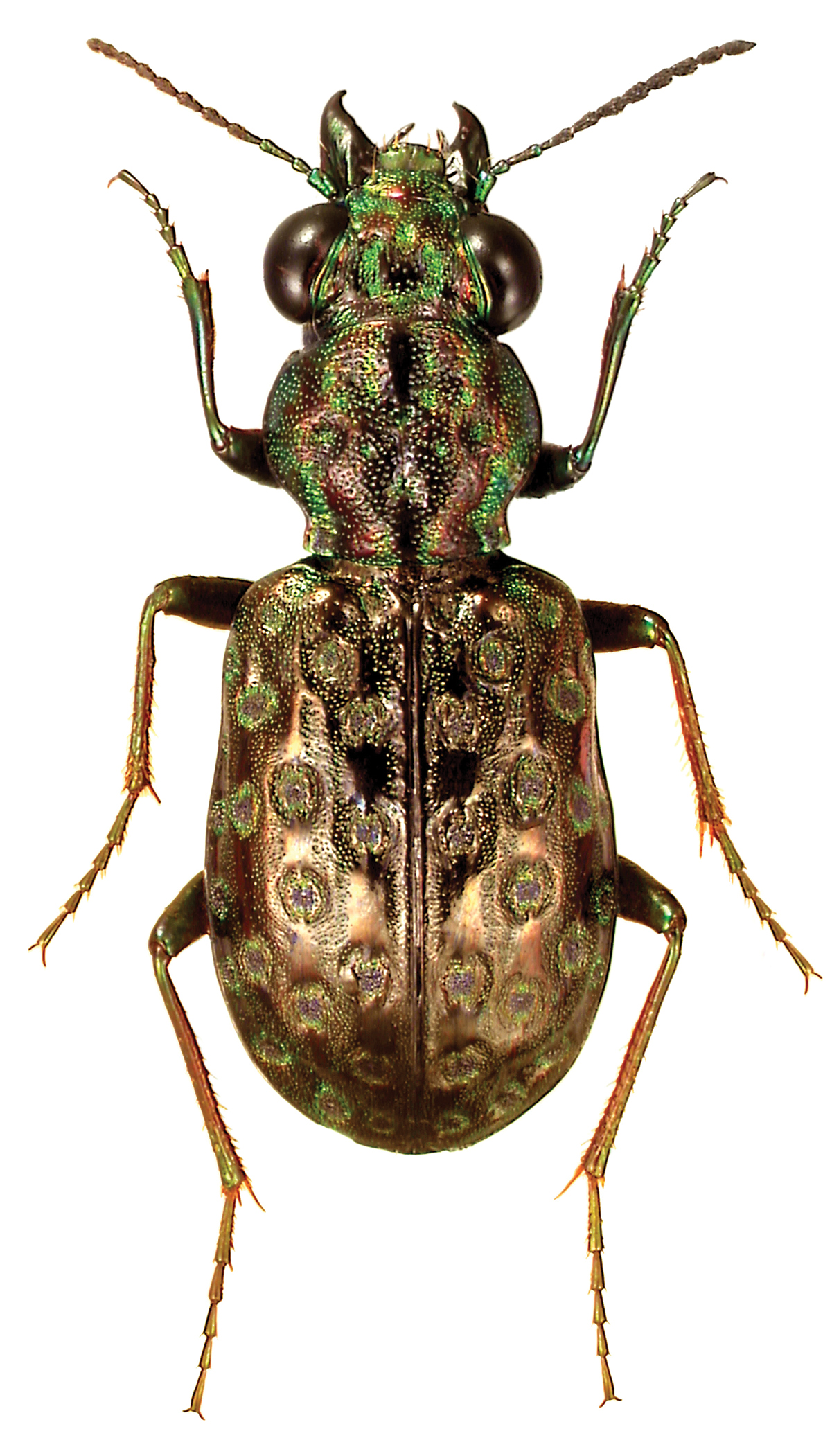

Scientific classification
- Kingdom: Animalia
- Phylum: Arthropoda
- Clade: Pancrustacea
- Class: Insecta
- Order: Coleoptera
- Suborder: Adephaga
- Family: Carabidae
- Genus: Elaphrus
- Species: E. fuliginosus

Binomial name
- Elaphrus fuliginosus Say, 1830

= Elaphrus fuliginosus =

Species of beetle

Elaphrus fuliginosus is a species of ground beetle in the subfamily Elaphrinae. It was described by Say in 1830.
