= Dixon High School (California) =

Public school in California, United States

Coordinates: 38.4362°N 121.8174°W

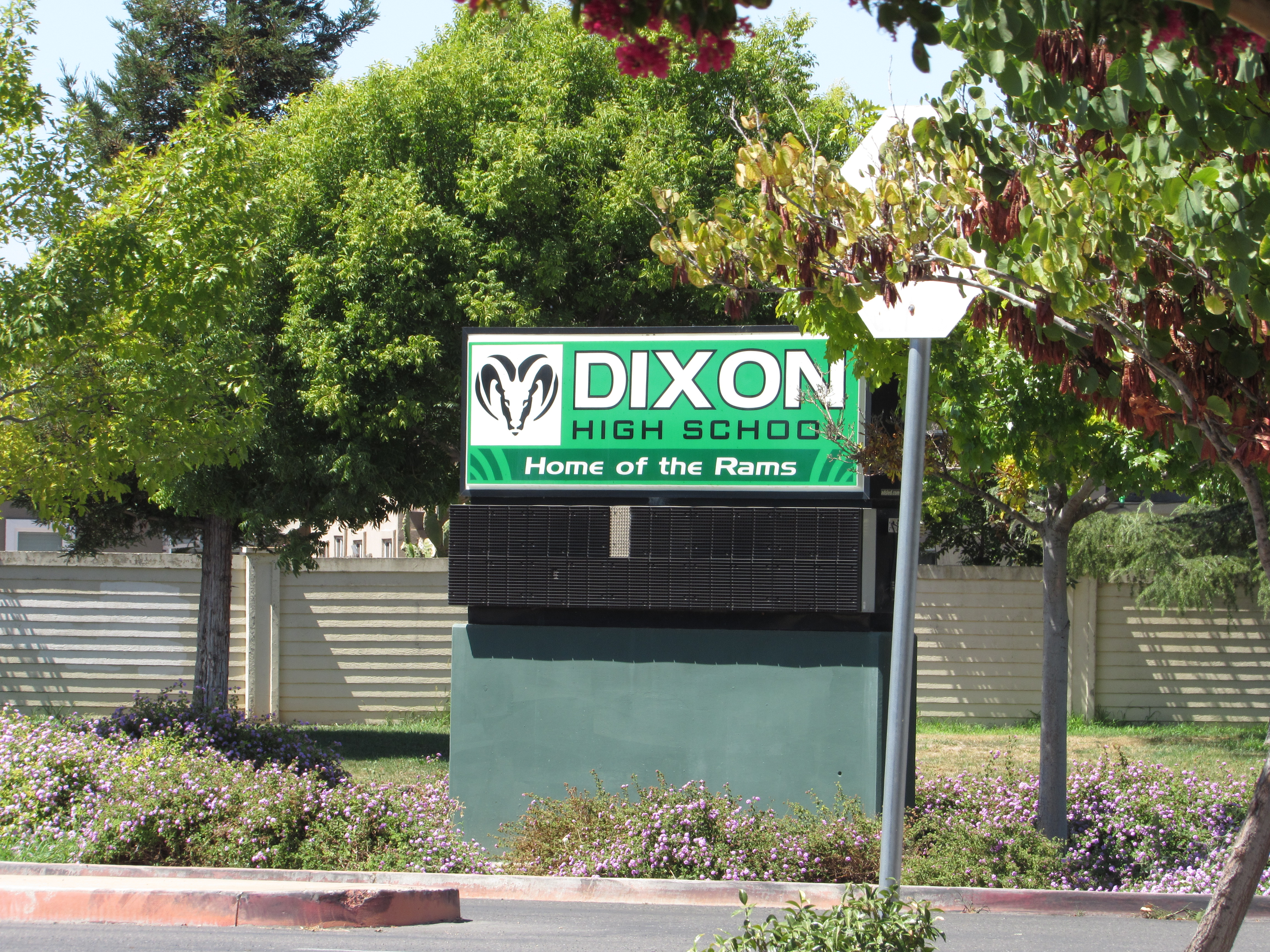
- 555 College Way, Dixon, CA 95620

Information
- School board: Dixon Unified School District
- NCES District ID: 0611280
- NCES School ID: 061128001251
- Principal: Angela Brown
- Teaching staff: 43.52 (on an FTE basis)
- Years offered: 9–12
- Enrollment: 1,012 (2023–2024)
- Student to teacher ratio: 23.25
- Campus type: Rural: Fringe
- Colors: Green and white
- Team name: Rams
- Website: dhs.dixonusd.org

Dixon High School high school in Dixon, California. It is the only mainstream high school in the town of 18,974 (as of 2021), although there is a small alternative high school called Maine Prairie High School. Dixon High School is part of the Dixon Unified School District.

It is located at 555 College Way. The school had previously been located at 455 East A St. from 1940 to 2007. The old location has since been converted into a middle school called John Knight Middle School. Named for a longtime Dixon High principal, the school opened in March 2021.

== Notable alumni ==
- Jon Pardi (2003), country singer
