= Dixon Unified School District =

School district in California, United States

Address
- 180 South First Street Dixon, California, 95620; United States

District information
- Type: Public
- Grades: K–12
- NCES District ID: 0611280

Students and staff
- Students: 2,956 (2020–2021)
- Teachers: 128.02 (FTE)
- Staff: 127.06 (FTE)
- Student–teacher ratio: 23.09:1

Other information
- Website: www.dixonusd.org

Dixon Unified School District is a public school district based in Solano County, California, United States. It includes Dixon High School.

== List of Schools ==
High schools

- Dixon High School
- Maine Prairie High School (continuation school)

Middle schools

- John Knight Middle School

Elementary schools

- Silveyville (closed as of 2008)
- Anderson
- Gretchen Higgins
- Tremont
