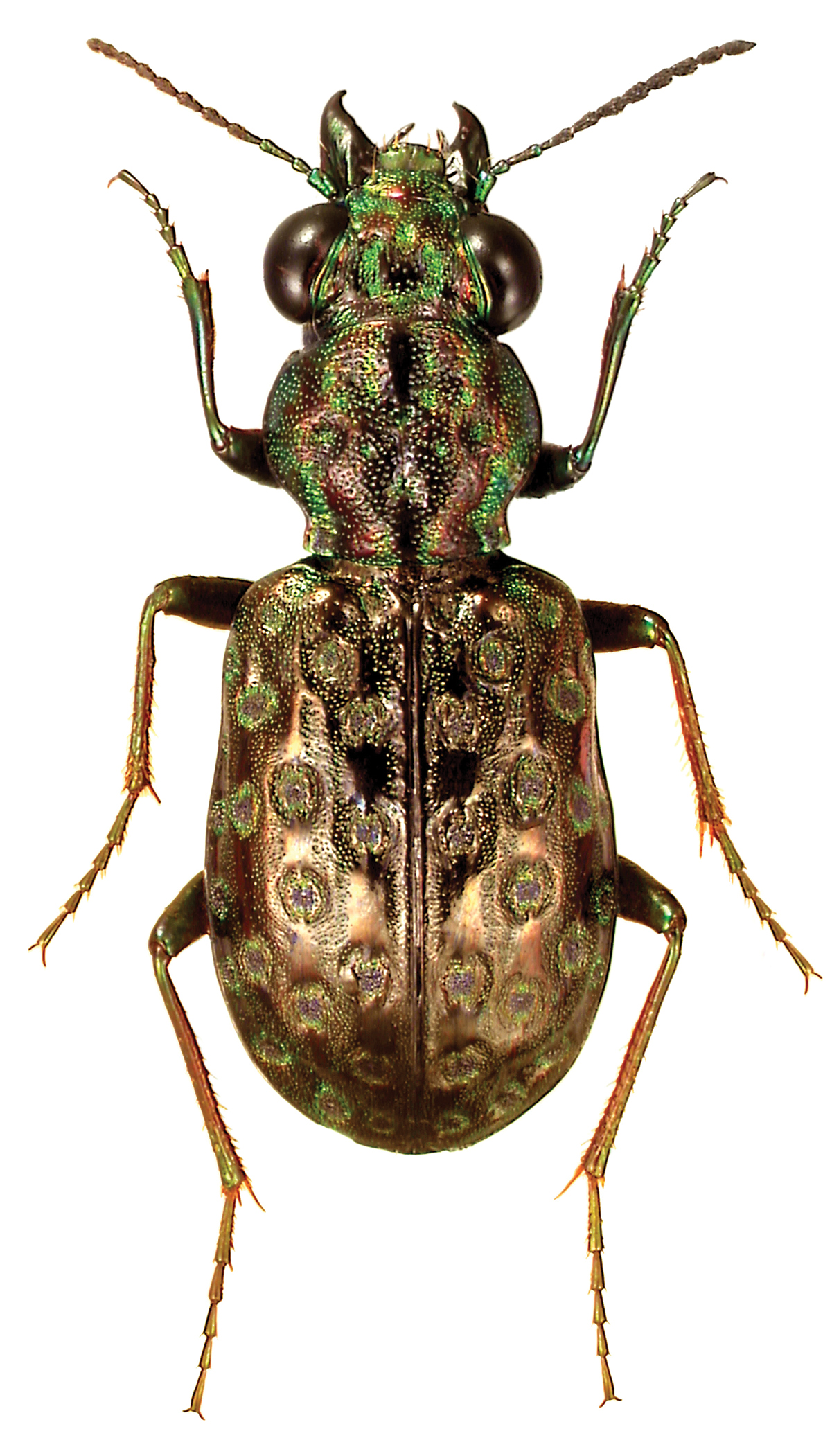
- Elaphrus fuliginosus

Scientific classification
- Kingdom: Animalia
- Phylum: Arthropoda
- Class: Insecta
- Order: Coleoptera
- Suborder: Adephaga
- Family: Carabidae
- Subfamily: Elaphrinae; Latreille, 1802

= Elaphrinae =

Subfamily of beetles

Elaphrinae is a subfamily of ground beetles in the family Carabidae. There are at least 4 genera and more than 50 described species in Elaphrinae.

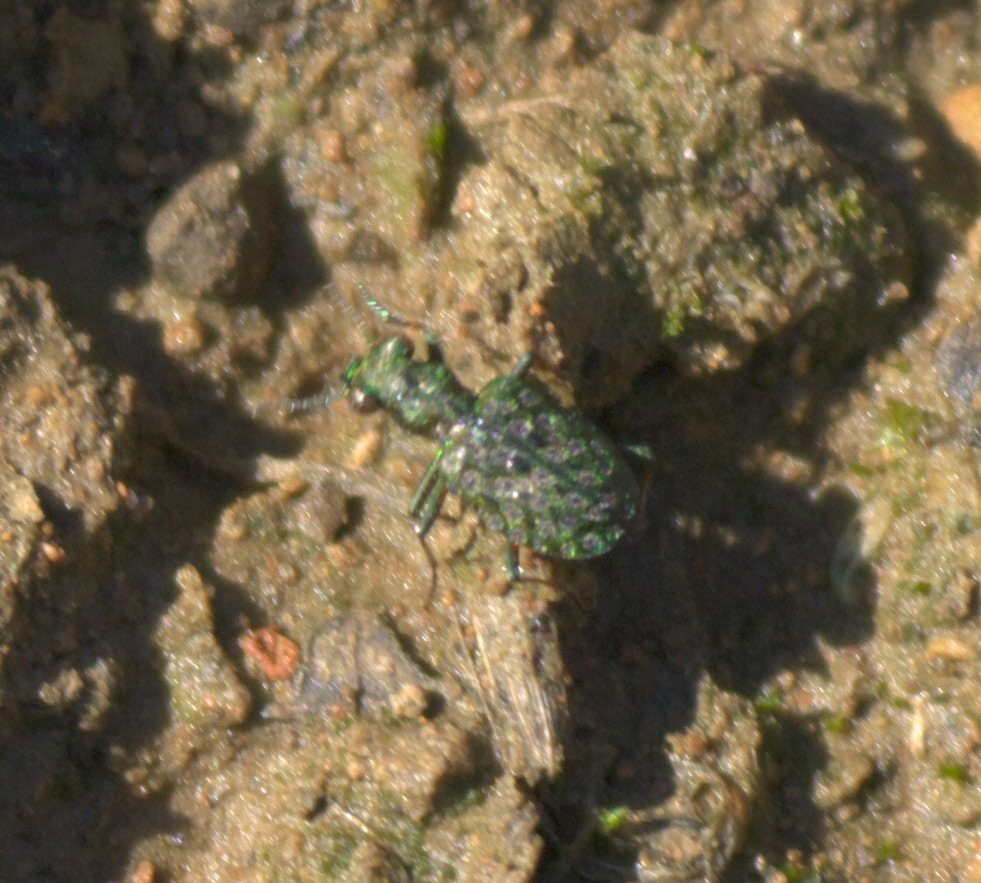
Elaphrus

== Genera ==
These four genera belong to the subfamily Elaphrinae:

- Blethisa Bonelli, 1810
- Diacheila Motschulsky, 1844
- Elaphrus Fabricius, 1775
- † Elaphrotites Haupt, 1856
