= 2003 All-Big East Conference football team =

American college football all-star team

The 2003 All-Big East Conference football team consists of American football players from the Big East Conference who were chosen as the best at their respective positions during the 2003 NCAA Division I-A football season. The organizations selecting All-Big East teams in 2003 included the conference's head football coaches. The coaches chose both first- and second-team players.

The Miami Hurricanes (No. 5 in the final AP poll) compiled an 11–2 record and placed eight players on the All-Big East first team. Safety Sean Taylor was selected as the 2003 Big East defensive player of the year. Other first-team honorees were tight end Kellen Winslow, offensive tackle Eric Winston, defensive tackle Vince Wilfork, linebackers Jonathan Vilma and D. J. Williams, cornerback Antrel Rolle, and kicker Jon Peattie. The Hurricanes also placed three on the second team. It was Miami's last season in the Big East, as they joined the Atlantic Coast Conference in 2004.

West Virginia tied for the conference championship and placed three players on the first team: running back Quincy Wilson; linebacker Grant Wiley; and safety Brian King. Wide receiver Chris Henry was chosen as the Big East rookie of the year, and Rich Rodriguez was selected as the Big East Coach of the year.

The Pittsburgh Panthers finished third in the conference and placed four players on the first team. Wide receiver Larry Fitzgerald was selected as the Big East offensive player of the year, and punter Andy Lee was the Big East co-special teams player of the year. The Panthers' other first-team honorees were quarterback Rod Rutherford and offensive tackle Rob Petitti.

== Offensive selections ==
=== Quarterbacks ===
- Rod Rutherford, Pitt (Coaches-1)
- Rasheed Mitchell, West Virginia (Coaches-2)

=== Running backs ===
- Kevin Jones, Virginia Tech (Coaches-1)
- Quincy Wilson, West Virginia (Coaches-1)
- Derrick Knight, Boston College (Coaches-2)
- Walter Reyes, Syracuse (Coaches-2)

=== Wide receivers ===
- Larry Fitzgerald, Pitt (Coaches-1)
- Zamir Cobb, Temple (Coaches-1)
- Ernest Wilford, Virginia Tech (Coaches-2)
- Chris Henry, West Virginia (Coaches-2)

=== Tight ends ===
- Kellen Winslow, Miami (Coaches-1)
- Kris Wilson, Pitt (Coaches-2)

=== Offensive tackles ===
- Eric Winston, Miami (Coaches-1)
- Rob Petitti, Pitt (Coaches-1)
- Adam Terry, Syracuse (Coaches-2)
- Jeff Berk, West Virginia (Coaches-2)

=== Offensive guard ===
- Augie Hoffmann, Boston College (Coaches-1)
- Chris Snee, Boston College (Coaches-1)
- Vernon Carey, Miami (Coaches-2)
- Chris Myers, Miami (Coaches-2)

=== Centers ===
- Jake Grove, Virginia Tech (Coaches-1)
- Nick Romeo, Syracuse (Coaches-2)

== Defensive selections ==
=== Defensive line ===
- Vince Wilfork, Miami (Coaches-1)
- Raheem Orr, Rutgers (Coaches-1)
- Mathias Kiwanuka, Boston College (Coaches-1)
- Louis Gachelin, Syracuse (Coaches-1)
- Doug Goodwin, Boston College (Coaches-2)
- Christian Ferrara, Syracuse (Coaches-2)
- Cols Colas, Virginia Tech (Coaches-2)
- Nathaniel Adibi, Virginia Tech (Coaches-2)

=== Linebackers ===
- Jonathan Vilma, Miami (Coaches-1)
- D. J. Williams, Miami (Coaches-1)
- Grant Wiley, West Virginia (Coaches-1)
- Rich Scanlon, Syracuse (Coaches-2)
- Rian Wallace, Temple (Coaches-2)
- Vegas Robinson, Virginia Tech (Coaches-2)

=== Cornerbacks ===
- Antrel Rolle, Miami (Coaches-1)
- DeAngelo Hall, Virginia Tech (Coaches-1)
- Will Blackmon,Boston College (Coaches-2)
- Adam Jones, West Virginia (Coaches-2)

=== Safeties ===
- Sean Taylor, Miami (Coaches-1)
- Brian King, West Virginia (Coaches-1)
- Maurice Sikes, Miami (Coaches-2)
- Michael Crawford, Virginia Tech (Coaches-2)

== Special teams ==
=== Kickers ===
- Jon Peattie, Miami (Coaches-1)
- Collin Barber, Syracuse (Coaches-2)

=== Punters ===
- Andy Lee, Pitt (Coaches-1)
- Brendan Carney, Syracuse (Coaches-2)

=== Return specialist ===
- DeAngelo Hall, Virginia Tech (Coaches-1)
- Nate Jones, Rutgers (Coaches-2)

== Individual awards ==
- Offensive player of the year - Larry Fitzgerald, Pitt
- Defensive player of the year - Sean Taylor, Miami
- Special teams player of the year - DeAngelo Hall, Virginia Tech, and Andy Lee, Pitt
- Rookie of the year - Chris Henry, West Virginia
- Coach of the year - Rich Rodriguez, West Virginia

== Key ==
Coaches, selected by the conference coaches

== See also ==
- 2003 All-America college football team
