= Robert Gallery =

American football player (born 1980)

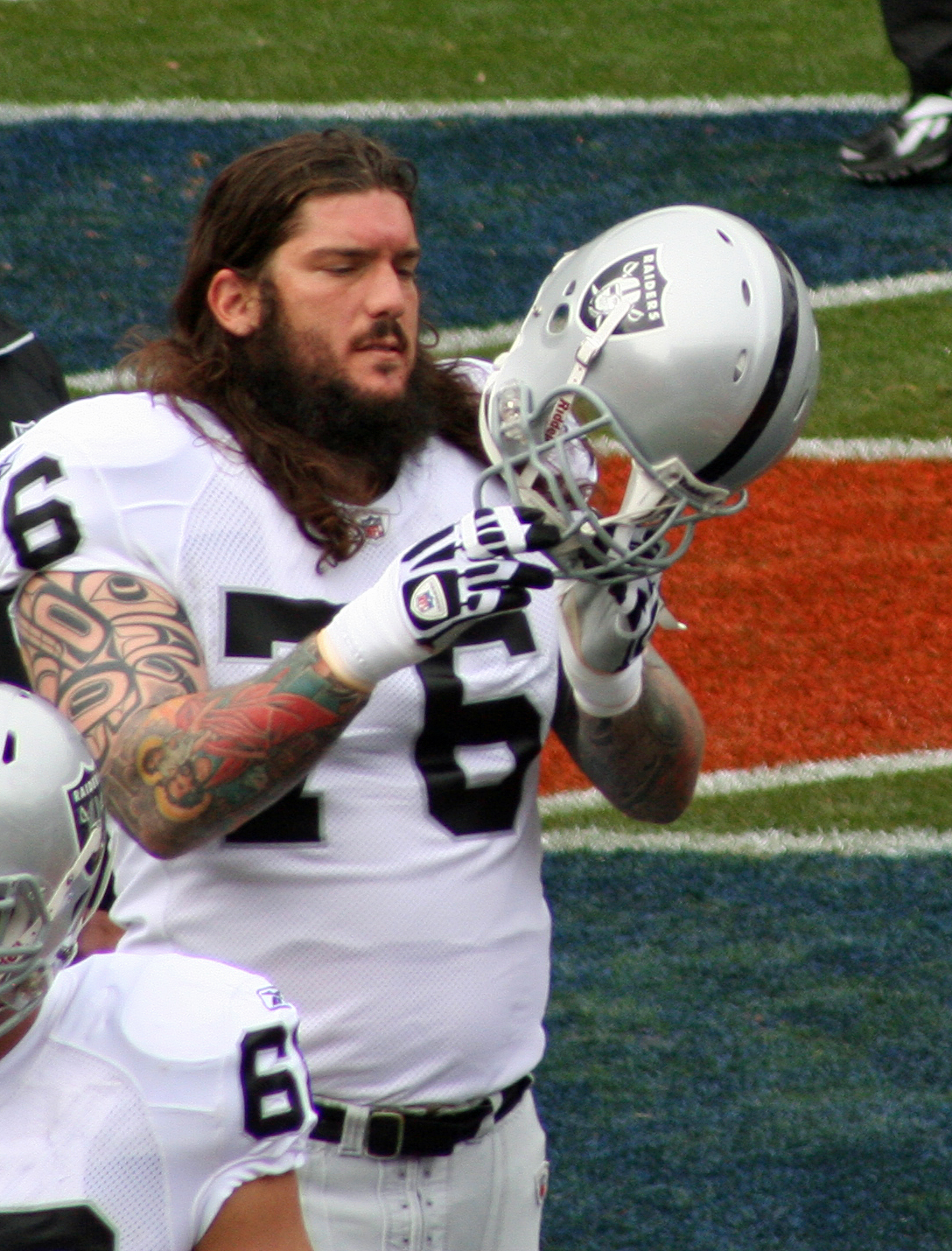
- Gallery with the Oakland Raiders in 2010

No. 76, 72
- Position: Guard

Personal information
- Born: July 26, 1980 (age 46); Manchester, Iowa, U.S.
- Listed height: 6 ft 7 in (2.01 m)
- Listed weight: 325 lb (147 kg)

Career information
- High school: East Buchanan (Winthrop, Iowa)
- College: Iowa (1999–2003)
- NFL draft: 2004: 1st round, 2nd overall pick

Career history
- Oakland Raiders (2004–2010); Seattle Seahawks (2011); New England Patriots (2012)*
- * Offseason or practice squad member only

Awards and highlights
- PFWA All-Rookie Team (2004); Outland Trophy (2003); Unanimous All-American (2003); Big Ten Offensive Lineman of the Year (2003); 2× First-team All-Big Ten (2002, 2003)

Career NFL statistics
- Games played: 104
- Games started: 103
- Fumble recoveries: 4
- Stats at Pro Football Reference
- College Football Hall of Fame

Robert J. Gallery (born July 26, 1980) is an American former professional football player who was an offensive guard for eight seasons in the National Football League (NFL). He played college football for the University of Iowa and received unanimous All-American recognition. He was selected with the second overall pick by the Oakland Raiders in the 2004 NFL draft. He also played for the Seattle Seahawks. Since retiring from professional football, Gallery has become a mental health advocate and is the co-founder and president of Athletes for Care, a 501(c)(3) nonprofit organization focused on athlete mental health, traumatic brain injury research, and psychedelic-assisted therapy advocacy.

== Early life ==
Gallery was born in Manchester, Iowa. He attended East Buchanan High School in Winthrop, Iowa and starred in football, basketball and track. In football, he played tight end and linebacker and also handled punting and kickoff duties. He was an all-conference honorable mention selection as a sophomore before being named first-team all-conference as a junior and senior. Gallery helped his high-school team to a three-year record of 24–8, including a 19–2 record in district play. He was a Des Moines Register Class 1A first-team all-state selection as a senior. In addition to his athletic accomplishments, Gallery earned the rank of Eagle Scout.

== College career ==
Gallery attended the University of Iowa and played for the Hawkeyes football team from 1999 to 2003. His older brother Nick had been an All-Big Ten punter for the Hawkeyes, and his younger brother John later became a punter for the team. After redshirting in 1999, Gallery had three catches for 52 yards as a starting tight end as a freshman before moving to the tackle position. He started six games at the right tackle position as a freshman.

As a sophomore, Gallery started every game at left tackle and made vast improvements throughout the year. He helped Iowa lead the Big Ten Conference in scoring in 2001 as Iowa qualified for its first bowl game in four years. As a junior in 2002, Gallery started all 13 games at left tackle and was a first-team All-Big Ten selection. He helped lead Iowa to its first Big Ten title in 12 years and its first undefeated conference season in 80 years. He also won the team's Hustle Award.

In 2003, Gallery led Iowa to another 10-win season and was voted as Iowa's co-captain and co-MVP for the season. He was a first-team All-Big Ten selection for the second straight year and named the Big Ten offensive lineman of the year. He was recognized as a unanimous first-team All-American as a senior in 2003. He was awarded the 2003 Outland Trophy, making him the third lineman from Iowa to win the award (along with Alex Karras and Cal Jones). He was also a three-time academic All-Big Ten selection at Iowa.

Gallery graduated with a bachelor's degree in education. As part of his pre-professional training, he taught at two local elementary schools.

On January 9, 2023, the College Football Hall of Fame selected Gallery for induction into the 2023 Class.

== Professional career ==
Pre-draft measurables
Height	Weight	Arm length	Hand span	40-yard dash	10-yard split	20-yard split	20-yard shuttle	Three-cone drill	Vertical jump	Broad jump	Bench press
6 ft 7 1/8 in (2.01 m)	323 lb (147 kg)	32 1/4 in (0.82 m)	9 1/4 in (0.23 m)	4.98 s	1.70 s	2.92 s	4.39 s	7.43 s	30.0 in (0.76 m)	8 ft 9 in (2.67 m)	24 reps
All values from NFL Combine

=== Oakland Raiders ===
Gallery was selected with the second overall pick in the 2004 NFL draft by the Oakland Raiders. He was regarded as "the best lineman to come out of college in years", with a perfect 9.0 prospect rating, the highest for any offensive lineman.

In 2004, Gallery started 15 games at right tackle and surrendered three sacks. In 2005, he started all 16 games at right tackle and allowed 3.5 sacks. The Raiders moved him to left tackle at the beginning of the 2006 preseason. In the Raiders' first game of the 2006 regular season, Gallery was part of an offensive line that surrendered nine sacks (at least three of which were charged to him) to the San Diego Chargers. He played in 13 games during the season and allowed 10.5 sacks, placing him fourth in the league despite missing three games. In 2007, Oakland moved Gallery to left guard.

Although Gallery had generally been considered a bust at the left tackle position for which he was selected and had limited success at the right tackle position, his performance improved as a left guard.

In 2010, Gallery was named the Oakland Raiders' recipient of the Ed Block Courage Award, voted on by his teammates, after rebounding from multiple injuries in 2009 that included an appendectomy during training camp and a broken leg that limited him to six starts.

=== Seattle Seahawks ===
On July 27, 2011, Gallery agreed to join the Seattle Seahawks on a three-year contract worth a reported $15 million. He was released after one season.

=== New England Patriots ===
On March 19, 2012, Gallery signed with the New England Patriots on a one-year deal. Gallery announced his retirement from professional football on August 4.

== Post-playing career ==
=== Mental health struggles ===
In the years following his retirement from the NFL in 2012, Gallery experienced significant mental health challenges attributed to repeated head trauma sustained during his football career. A 3D brain scan revealed extensive brain damage from concussions accumulated over his playing years. Gallery has spoken publicly about suffering from anxiety, depression, cognitive fog, memory loss, tinnitus, alcohol dependency, and suicidal ideation during this period. He pursued a range of conventional medical treatments over several years, including hyperbaric oxygen therapy and various specialist consultations, but found limited relief.

=== Recovery through psychedelic-assisted therapy ===
In 2021, after hearing a podcast interview with Marcus Capone, a former Navy SEAL and co-founder of the nonprofit Veterans Exploring Treatment Solutions (VETS), about his similar struggles and recovery, Gallery traveled to Mexico to undergo treatment with ibogaine, a psychoactive compound derived from the West African iboga plant. Ibogaine is classified as a Schedule I substance in the United States but has been the subject of research into its potential to treat traumatic brain injury, addiction, and post-traumatic stress disorder. Gallery has stated publicly that the treatment dramatically alleviated his symptoms, including his anxiety, depression, suicidal thoughts, and tinnitus. He underwent a second treatment in 2023.

=== Athletes for Care ===
Gallery co-founded Athletes for Care (A4C), a 501(c)(3) nonprofit organization dedicated to athlete mental health advocacy, research, and education, and serves as its president and CEO. The organization focuses on connecting retired athletes with mental health and wellness resources, advocating for legislative progress on psychedelic-assisted psychotherapy accessibility in sports, funding research on traumatic brain injury and psychedelic-assisted therapies, and educating the public and policymakers.

Gallery has become a prominent public advocate for psychedelic-assisted therapy research and access for athletes. He spoke at the Psychedelic Science 2025 conference in Denver and has been profiled or interviewed by The Athletic, The Gazette, The Washington Post, the Will Cain Show on Fox News Radio, and the Team Never Quit podcast with Marcus Luttrell.
