= Shannon Snell =

American football player (born 1982)

No. 75
- Position: Guard

Personal information
- Born: April 27, 1982 (age 44); Tampa, Florida, U.S.
- Listed height: 6 ft 2 in (1.88 m)
- Listed weight: 310 lb (141 kg)

Career information
- High school: Hillsborough (Tampa)
- College: Florida
- NFL draft: 2004: undrafted

Career history
- Denver Broncos (2004)*; Minnesota Vikings (2004–2005)*; → Berlin Thunder (2005); Dallas Cowboys (2005–2006)*; Jacksonville Jaguars (2006)*
- * Offseason or practice squad member only

Awards and highlights
- First-team All-American (2003); Second-team All-SEC (2002)

Shannon Michael Snell (born April 27, 1982) is an American former professional football player who was a guard for two seasons in the National Football League (NFL). Snell played college football for the Florida Gators, earning first-team All-American honors in 2003. Thereafter, he played professionally for the Dallas Cowboys and the Jacksonville Jaguars of the NFL.

== Early life ==
Snell was born in Tampa, Florida in 1982. He attended Hillsborough High School in Tampa, and was a three-year starter for the Hillsborough Terriers high school football team. Following his senior season in 1999, he was recognized as a USA Today High School All-American.

== College career ==
Snell accepted an athletic scholarship to attend the University of Florida in Gainesville, Florida, where he was an offensive lineman for coach Steve Spurrier and coach Ron Zook's Florida Gators football teams from 2000 to 2003. He was a three-season starter, who played in forty-six games and started thirty-six. Snell was a Sporting News first-team All-American in 2003.

== Professional career ==
Snell was signed as an undrafted free agent by the Dallas Cowboys in 2005, and was signed by the Jacksonville Jaguars in 2006.

== See also ==
- 2003 College Football All-America Team
- List of Florida Gators football All-Americans
