= Dave Ball (defensive end) =

American football player (born 1981)

No. 96, 98
- Position: Defensive end

Personal information
- Born: January 4, 1981 (age 45); Fairfield, California, U.S.
- Listed height: 6 ft 5 in (1.96 m)
- Listed weight: 255 lb (116 kg)

Career information
- High school: Dixon (Dixon, California)
- College: UCLA
- NFL draft: 2004: 5th round, 133rd overall pick

Career history
- San Diego Chargers (2004–2005); New York Jets (2005–2006); Carolina Panthers (2007)*; Tennessee Titans (2008–2012)
- * Offseason or practice squad member only

Awards and highlights
- Unanimous All-American (2003); Morris Trophy (2003); Pop Warner Trophy (2003); Pac-10 Defensive Player of the Year (2003); First-team All-Pac-10 (2003); Second-team All-Pac-10 (2002)

Career NFL statistics
- Total tackles: 128
- Sacks: 15.5
- Forced fumbles: 3
- Fumble recoveries: 2
- Interceptions: 1
- Defensive touchdowns: 1
- Stats at Pro Football Reference

David Stewart Ball (born January 4, 1981) is an American former professional football player who was a defensive end in the National Football League (NFL) for eight seasons. He played college football for the UCLA Bruins, earning unanimous All-American honors in 2003. He was selected by the San Diego Chargers in the fifth round of the 2004 NFL draft, with whom he played briefly as well as the New York Jets, but spent most of his NFL career with the Tennessee Titans.

== Early life ==
Ball was born in Fairfield, California. He attended Dixon High School in Dixon, California, where he was a three-year letterman for the Dixon High School football and basketball teams.

== College career ==
Ball attended the University of California, Los Angeles, where he played defensive end for the Bruins from 2000 to 2003. He was a starter during his final three seasons. In 2003, Ball tied for the national lead with 16.5 quarterback sacks, setting a UCLA record. He also set the UCLA record for most career sacks with 30.5. Ball earned unanimous All-American honors in 2003, and was selected as the ABC-Chevrolet National Defensive Player of the Year, and won the Pop Warner Award as the top senior player on the West Coast. Ball was also a two-time first-team All-Pac-10 selection.

== Professional career ==
Ball was selected in the fifth round by the San Diego Chargers (pick no. 133) in the 2004 NFL draft. He was released by the Chargers during the 2005 season and was picked up by the New York Jets. Ball was signed as a free agent by the Carolina Panthers on March 26, 2007. On September 1, 2007, Ball was cut from the Panthers before the start of the NFL regular season. Ball did not play in the 2007 season, despite being signed by the Titans in January prior to their playoff game against the San Diego Chargers. Ball played for Tennessee from 2008 to 2011. In his NFL career, he has had 123 tackles and 15.5 sacks.also an interception and return for touchdown against the lions in 2008
