= List of unanimous All-Americans in college football =

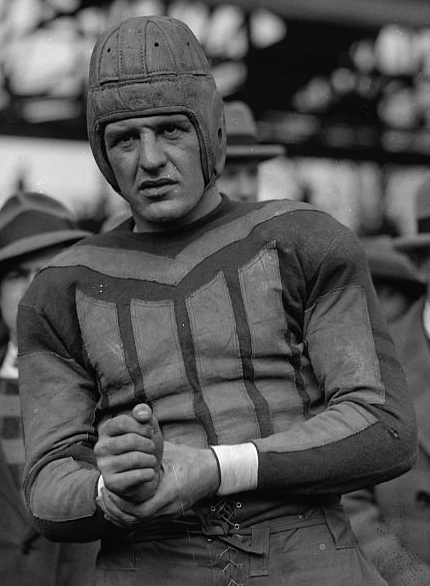
Red Grange of Illinois, the first unanimous All-American

The College Football All-America Team is an honorific college football all-star team compiled after each NCAA Division I Football Bowl Subdivision (FBS) season to recognize that season's most outstanding performers at their respective positions. There are several organizations that select their own All-America teams. Since 1924, the NCAA has designated selectors whose teams are used to determine "consensus" and "unanimous" All-Americans. Any player who is named to the first team by at least half the official selectors for a given season is recognized as being a consensus All-American. (Note: If no player meets this criterion at a position, the player who receives the most first-team selections at that position can be designated as a consensus All-American. Second and third teams are used to break ties. In the case of a true tie, all players are listed.) A player on the first team of every official selector is recognized as being a unanimous All-American. Since 2002, the five selectors designated by the NCAA for this purpose are the Associated Press (AP), the American Football Coaches Association (AFCA), the Football Writers Association of America (FWAA), Sporting News, and the Walter Camp Football Foundation (WCFF).

Unanimous All-Americans are considered "elite, the cream of the crop from any particular season." Many are later inducted into the College Football Hall of Fame, and many also go on to have successful professional football careers. From 1924 to 2000, 364 players were unanimous selections at least once. Thus, only a handful of players—if any—each season receive the honor. The first player to do so was Red Grange, star halfback for the Illinois Fighting Illini, who received first-team honors from all six major selectors in 1924.

Ohio State has the most unanimous All-America selections of any school with 42 selections. In 2020, Alabama tied a record set in 2003 by University of Oklahoma with five unanimous selections in one year. Eighty-nine schools have had at least one unanimous All-America selection; the most recent schools to produce their first unanimous All-American are Cincinnati and Northwestern, doing so in 2022. The most recent All-America team, that of 2025, included 13 unanimous selections. Only 31 players have been selected a unanimous All-American in multiple seasons, the most recent being Caleb Downs of Ohio State in 2024 and 2025. Herschel Walker is the only three-time unanimous All-American.

== Key ==
AFCA	American Football Coaches Association
AAB	All-America Board
AP	Associated Press
COL	Collier's
CNN	CNN Sports Illustrated
CP	Central Press Association
FN	Football News
FBW	Football World
FWAA	Football Writers Association of America
LIB	Liberty
LK	Look
NANA	North American Newspaper Alliance
NEA	Newspaper Enterprise Association
SN	Sporting News
UP/UPI	United Press/United Press International
WC	Walter Camp/Walter Camp Football Foundation

== List ==
Season	Selectors	Player	Position	Team
1924	AAB, FBW, INS, LIB, NEA, WC	Red Grange	HB	Illinois
1925	AAB, AP, COL, FBW, INS, LIB, NEA, UP	Andy Oberlander	HB	Dartmouth
1925	AAB, AP, COL, FBW, INS, LIB, NEA, UP	Ed Weir	T	Nebraska
1926	AAB, AP, COL, INS, NEA, UP	Frank Wickhorst	T	Navy
1927	AAB, AP, COL, INS, NANA, NEA, UP	Bennie Oosterbaan	End	Michigan
1927	AAB, AP, COL, INS, NANA, NEA, UP	Gibby Welch	HB	Pittsburgh
1928	AAB, AP, COL, INS, NANA, NEA, UP	Red Cagle	HB	Army
1929	AAB, AP, COL, INS, NANA, NEA, UP	Frank Carideo	QB	Notre Dame
1929	AAB, AP, COL, INS, NANA, NEA, UP	Joe Donchess	End	Pittsburgh
1930	AAB, AP, COL, INS, NANA, NEA, UP	Frank Carideo	QB	Notre Dame
1930	AAB, AP, COL, INS, NANA, NEA, UP	Wes Fesler	End	Ohio State
1930	AAB, AP, COL, INS, NANA, NEA, UP	Fred Sington	T	Alabama
1930	AAB, AP, COL, INS, NANA, NEA, UP	Ben Ticknor	C	Harvard
1931	AAB, AP, COL, INS, LIB, NEA, UP	Jerry Dalrymple	End	Tulane
1931	AAB, AP, COL, INS, LIB, NEA, UP	Marchmont Schwartz (Note: Player not listed in the NCAA record book as a unanimous selection for the given season despite being named to the first team by all major selectors.)	HB	Notre Dame
1932	AAB, AP, COL, FWAA, INS, LIB, NEA, UP	Warren Heller	HB	Pittsburgh
1932	AAB, AP, COL, FWAA, INS, LIB, NEA, UP	Joe Kurth	T	Notre Dame
1932	AAB, AP, COL, FWAA, INS, LIB, NEA, UP	Paul Moss	End	Purdue
1932	AAB, AP, COL, FWAA, INS, LIB, NEA, UP	Harry Newman	QB	Michigan
1932	AAB, AP, COL, FWAA, INS, LIB, NEA, UP	Ernie Smith	T	USC
1933	AAB, AP, COL, FWAA, INS, LIB, NANA, NEA, UP	Chuck Bernard	C	Michigan
1933	AAB, AP, COL, FWAA, INS, LIB, NANA, NEA, UP	Cotton Warburton	QB	USC
1934	AAB, AP, COL, INS, LIB, NANA, NEA, SN, UP	None	N/A	N/A
1935	AAB, AP, COL, INS, LIB, NANA, NEA, SN, UP	Jay Berwanger	HB	Chicago
1935	AAB, AP, COL, INS, LIB, NANA, NEA, SN, UP	Bobby Grayson	FB	Stanford
1936	AAB, AP, COL, INS, LIB, NANA, NEA, SN, UP	Sam Francis	FB	Nebraska
1936	AAB, AP, COL, INS, LIB, NANA, NEA, SN, UP	Larry Kelley	End	Yale
1936	AAB, AP, COL, INS, LIB, NANA, NEA, SN, UP	Gaynell Tinsley	End	LSU
1936	AAB, AP, COL, INS, LIB, NANA, NEA, SN, UP	Ed Widseth	T	Minnesota
1937	AAB, AP, COL, INS, LIB, NANA, NEA, NW, SN, UP	Clint Frank	QB	Yale
1938	AAB, AP, COL, INS, LIB, NEA, NW, SN, UP	Ed Beinor	T	Notre Dame
1938	AAB, AP, COL, INS, LIB, NEA, NW, SN, UP	Marshall Goldberg	FB	Pittsburgh
1938	AAB, AP, COL, INS, LIB, NEA, NW, SN, UP	Ralph Heikkinen	G	Michigan
1938	AAB, AP, COL, INS, LIB, NEA, NW, SN, UP	Davey O'Brien	QB	TCU
1939	AAB, AP, COL, INS, LIB, NEA, NW, SN, UP	Harry Smith	G	USC
1939	AAB, AP, COL, INS, LIB, NEA, NW, SN, UP	Nick Drahos	T	Cornell
1940	AAB, AP, COL, INS, LIB, NEA, NW, SN, UP	Tom Harmon	HB	Michigan
1940	AAB, AP, COL, INS, LIB, NEA, NW, SN, UP	John Kimbrough	FB	Texas A&M
1940	AAB, AP, COL, INS, LIB, NEA, NW, SN, UP	Bob Suffridge	G	Tennessee
1941	AAB, AP, COL, INS, LIB, NEA, NW, SN, UP	Endicott Peabody	G	Harvard
1942	AAB, AP, COL, INS, LK, NEA, NW, SN, UP	Dave Schreiner	End	Wisconsin
1942	AAB, AP, COL, INS, LK, NEA, NW, SN, UP	Frank Sinkwich	HB	Georgia
1943	AAB, AP, COL, FN, INS, LK, SN, UP	Bill Daley	HB	Michigan
1943	AAB, AP, COL, FN, INS, LK, SN, UP	Cas Myslinski	C	Army
1944	AAB, AP, COL, FN, INS, LK, NEA, SN, UP	Les Horvath	QB	Ohio State
1944	AAB, AP, COL, FN, INS, LK, NEA, SN, UP	Don Whitmire	T	Navy
1945	AAB, AFCA, AP, COL, FWAA, INS, LK, NEA, SN, UP	Warren Amling	G	Ohio State
1945	AAB, AFCA, AP, COL, FWAA, INS, LK, NEA, SN, UP	Doc Blanchard	FB	Army
1945	AAB, AFCA, AP, COL, FWAA, INS, LK, NEA, SN, UP	Glenn Davis	HB	Army
1945	AAB, AFCA, AP, COL, FWAA, INS, LK, NEA, SN, UP	Herman Wedemeyer	HB	Saint Mary's
1946	AAB, AFCA, AP, COL, FWAA, INS, NEA, SN, UP	Burr Baldwin	End	UCLA
1946	AAB, AFCA, AP, COL, FWAA, INS, NEA, SN, UP	Doc Blanchard	FB	Army
1946	AAB, AFCA, AP, COL, FWAA, INS, NEA, SN, UP	Glenn Davis	HB	Army
1946	AAB, AFCA, AP, COL, FWAA, INS, NEA, SN, UP	Johnny Lujack	QB	Notre Dame
1946	AAB, AFCA, AP, COL, FWAA, INS, NEA, SN, UP	Charley Trippi	HB	Georgia
1947	AFCA, AP, COL, FWAA, INS, NEA, SN, UP	Bob Chappuis	HB	Michigan
1947	AFCA, AP, COL, FWAA, INS, NEA, SN, UP	Johnny Lujack	QB	Notre Dame
1948	AFCA, AP, FW, INS, NEA, SN, UP	Chuck Bednarik	C	Penn
1948	AFCA, AP, FW, INS, NEA, SN, UP	Leo Nomellini	T	Minnesota
1948	AFCA, AP, FW, INS, NEA, SN, UP	Doak Walker	HB	SMU
1949	AAB, AP, COL, FWAA, INS, NEA, SN, UP	Rod Franz	G	California
1949	AAB, AP, COL, FWAA, INS, NEA, SN, UP	Leon Hart	End	Notre Dame
1949	AAB, AP, COL, FWAA, INS, NEA, SN, UP	Emil Sitko	FB	Notre Dame
1949	AAB, AP, COL, FWAA, INS, NEA, SN, UP	Clayton Tonnemaker	C	Minnesota
1950	AAB, AFCA, AP, FWAA, INS, NEA, SN, UP	Dan Foldberg	End	Army
1950	AAB, AFCA, AP, FWAA, INS, NEA, SN, UP	Vic Janowicz	HB	Ohio State
1950	AAB, AFCA, AP, FWAA, INS, NEA, SN, UP	Bud McFadin	G	Texas
1951	AAB, AFCA, AP, FW, INS, NEA, SN, UP	Don Coleman	T	Michigan State
1951	AAB, AFCA, AP, FW, INS, NEA, SN, UP	Dick Kazmaier	HB	Princeton
1951	AAB, AFCA, AP, FW, INS, NEA, SN, UP	Hank Lauricella	HB	Tennessee
1951	AAB, AFCA, AP, FW, INS, NEA, SN, UP	Bill McColl	End	Stanford
1951	AAB, AFCA, AP, FW, INS, NEA, SN, UP	Bob Ward	G	Maryland
1951	AAB, AFCA, AP, FW, INS, NEA, SN, UP	Jim Weatherall	T	Oklahoma
1952	AAB, AFCA, AP, FWAA, INS, NEA, SN, UP	Jack Scarbath	QB	Maryland
1952	AAB, AFCA, AP, FWAA, INS, NEA, SN, UP	Johnny Lattner	HB	Notre Dame
1953	AAB, AFCA, AP, FWAA, INS, NEA, SN, UP	Paul Giel	QB	Minnesota
1953	AAB, AFCA, AP, FWAA, INS, NEA, SN, UP	Stan Jones	T	Maryland
1953	AAB, AFCA, AP, FWAA, INS, NEA, SN, UP	Johnny Lattner	HB	Notre Dame
1954	AAB, AFCA, AP, FWAA, INS, NEA, SN, UP	Alan Ameche	FB	Wisconsin
1954	AAB, AFCA, AP, FWAA, INS, NEA, SN, UP	Bud Brooks	G	Arkansas
1954	AAB, AFCA, AP, FWAA, INS, NEA, SN, UP	Howard Cassady	HB	Ohio State
1954	AAB, AFCA, AP, FWAA, INS, NEA, SN, UP	Ralph Guglielmi	QB	Notre Dame
1955	AAB, AFCA, AP, FWAA, INS, NEA, SN, UP	Ron Beagle	End	Navy
1955	AAB, AFCA, AP, FWAA, INS, NEA, SN, UP	Howard Cassady	HB	Ohio State
1955	AAB, AFCA, AP, FWAA, INS, NEA, SN, UP	Bob Pellegrini	C	Maryland
1955	AAB, AFCA, AP, FWAA, INS, NEA, SN, UP	Jim Swink	HB	TCU
1956	AFCA, AP, FWAA, INS, NEA, SN, UP	Jim Brown	FB	Syracuse
1956	AFCA, AP, FWAA, INS, NEA, SN, UP	Bill Glass	G	Baylor
1956	AFCA, AP, FWAA, INS, NEA, SN, UP	Ron Kramer	End	Michigan
1956	AFCA, AP, FWAA, INS, NEA, SN, UP	Johnny Majors	HB	Tennessee
1956	AFCA, AP, FWAA, INS, NEA, SN, UP	Jim Parker	G	Ohio State
1956	AFCA, AP, FWAA, INS, NEA, SN, UP	Jerry Tubbs	C	Oklahoma
1956	AFCA, AP, FWAA, INS, NEA, SN, UP	Joe Walton	End	Pittsburgh
1957	AAB, AFCA, AP, FWAA, INS, NEA, SN, UP	John David Crow	HB	Texas A&M
1957	AAB, AFCA, AP, FWAA, INS, NEA, SN, UP	Jim Phillips	End	Auburn
1958	AFCA, AP, FWAA, NEA, SN, UPI	Billy Cannon	HB	LSU
1958	AFCA, AP, FWAA, NEA, SN, UPI	Pete Dawkins	HB	Army
1958	AFCA, AP, FWAA, NEA, SN, UPI	Randy Duncan	QB	Iowa
1959	AFCA, AP, FWAA, NEA, SN, UPI	Billy Cannon	HB	LSU
1959	AFCA, AP, FWAA, NEA, SN, UPI	Roger Davis	G	Syracuse
1959	AFCA, AP, FWAA, NEA, SN, UPI	Charlie Flowers	FB	Ole Miss
1959	AFCA, AP, FWAA, NEA, SN, UPI	Dan Lanphear	T	Wisconsin
1960	AFCA, AP, FWAA, NEA, SN, UPI	Joe Bellino	HB	Navy
1960	AFCA, AP, FWAA, NEA, SN, UPI	Tom Brown	G	Minnesota
1960	AFCA, AP, FWAA, NEA, SN, UPI	Mike Ditka	End	Pittsburgh
1960	AFCA, AP, FWAA, NEA, SN, UPI	Bob Ferguson	FB	Ohio State
1960	AFCA, AP, FWAA, NEA, SN, UPI	Jake Gibbs	QB	Ole Miss
1960	AFCA, AP, FWAA, NEA, SN, UPI	Dan LaRose	End	Missouri
1960	AFCA, AP, FWAA, NEA, SN, UPI	Bob Lilly	T	TCU
1961	AFCA, AP, FWAA, NEA, SN, UPI	Ernie Davis	HB	Syracuse
1961	AFCA, AP, FWAA, NEA, SN, UPI	Bob Ferguson	FB	Ohio State
1961	AFCA, AP, FWAA, NEA, SN, UPI	Billy Neighbors	T	Alabama
1961	AFCA, AP, FWAA, NEA, SN, UPI	Jimmy Saxton	HB	Texas
1961	AFCA, AP, FWAA, NEA, SN, UPI	Roy Winston	G	LSU
1962	AFCA, AP, FWAA, NEA, SN, UPI	Terry Baker	QB	Oregon State
1962	AFCA, AP, FWAA, NEA, SN, UPI	Bobby Bell	T	Minnesota
1962	AFCA, AP, FWAA, NEA, SN, UPI	Lee Roy Jordan	C	Alabama
1962	AFCA, AP, FWAA, NEA, SN, UPI	Jerry Stovall	HB	LSU
1962	AFCA, AP, FWAA, NEA, SN, UPI	Johnny Treadwell	G	Texas
1963	AFCA, AP, CP, FWAA, NEA, SN, UPI	Scott Appleton	T	Texas
1963	AFCA, AP, CP, FWAA, NEA, SN, UPI	Bob Brown	G	Nebraska
1963	AFCA, AP, CP, FWAA, NEA, SN, UPI	Dick Butkus	C	Illinois
1963	AFCA, AP, CP, FWAA, NEA, SN, UPI	Roger Staubach	QB	Navy
1964	AFCA, AP, CP, FWAA, NEA, UPI	Larry Kramer	T	Nebraska
1965	AFCA, AP, CP, FWAA, NEA, UPI	Dick Arrington	G	Notre Dame
1965	AFCA, AP, CP, FWAA, NEA, UPI	Mike Garrett	RB	USC
1965	AFCA, AP, CP, FWAA, NEA, UPI	Jim Grabowski	RB	Illinois
1965	AFCA, AP, CP, FWAA, NEA, UPI	Howard Twilley	End	Tulsa
1966	AFCA, AP, CP, FWAA, NEA, UPI	Jack Clancy	End	Michigan
1966	AFCA, AP, CP, FWAA, NEA, UPI	Nick Eddy	RB	Notre Dame
1966	AFCA, AP, CP, FWAA, NEA, UPI	Cecil Dowdy	T	Alabama
1966	AFCA, AP, CP, FWAA, NEA, UPI	Jim Lynch	LB	Notre Dame
1966	AFCA, AP, CP, FWAA, NEA, UPI	Loyd Phillips	DT	Arkansas
1966	AFCA, AP, CP, FWAA, NEA, UPI	Bubba Smith	DE	Michigan State
1966	AFCA, AP, CP, FWAA, NEA, UPI	Steve Spurrier	QB	Florida
1966	AFCA, AP, CP, FWAA, NEA, UPI	George Webster	DB	Michigan State
1967	AFCA, AP, CP, FWAA, NEA, UPI	Gary Beban	QB	UCLA
1967	AFCA, AP, CP, FWAA, NEA, UPI	Larry Csonka	RB	Syracuse
1967	AFCA, AP, CP, FWAA, NEA, UPI	Ted Hendricks	DE	Miami (FL)
1967	AFCA, AP, CP, FWAA, NEA, UPI	Bob Johnson	C	Tennessee
1967	AFCA, AP, CP, FWAA, NEA, UPI	Leroy Keyes	RB	Purdue
1967	AFCA, AP, CP, FWAA, NEA, UPI	Granville Liggins	NT	Oklahoma
1967	AFCA, AP, CP, FWAA, NEA, UPI	O. J. Simpson	RB	USC
1967	AFCA, AP, CP, FWAA, NEA, UPI	Ron Yary	T	USC
1968	AFCA, AP, CP, FWAA, NEA, UPI	John Didion	C	Oregon State
1968	AFCA, AP, CP, FWAA, NEA, UPI	Dave Foley	T	Ohio State
1968	AFCA, AP, CP, FWAA, NEA, UPI	Leroy Keyes	RB	Purdue
1968	AFCA, AP, CP, FWAA, NEA, UPI	Ted Kwalick	End	Penn State
1968	AFCA, AP, CP, FWAA, NEA, UPI	Ted Hendricks	DE	Miami (FL)
1968	AFCA, AP, CP, FWAA, NEA, UPI	Charles Rosenfelder	G	Tennessee
1968	AFCA, AP, CP, FWAA, NEA, UPI	O. J. Simpson	RB	USC
1969	AFCA, AP, CP, FWAA, NEA, UPI	Steve Kiner	LB	Tennessee
1969	AFCA, AP, CP, FWAA, NEA, UPI	Mike McCoy	DT	Notre Dame
1969	AFCA, AP, CP, FWAA, NEA, UPI	Steve Owens	RB	Oklahoma
1969	AFCA, AP, CP, FWAA, NEA, UPI	Mike Phipps	QB	Purdue
1969	AFCA, AP, CP, FWAA, NEA, UPI	Mike Reid	DT	Penn State
1970	AFCA, AP, CP, FWAA, NEA, UPI	Chip Kell	G	Tennessee
1970	AFCA, AP, CP, FWAA, NEA, UPI	Jim Stillwagon	NT	Ohio State
1970	AFCA, AP, CP, FWAA, NEA, UPI	Jack Tatum	DB	Ohio State
1971	AFCA, AP, FWAA, NEA, UPI	Terry Beasley	WR	Auburn
1971	AFCA, AP, FWAA, NEA, UPI	Bobby Majors	DB	Tennessee
1971	AFCA, AP, FWAA, NEA, UPI	Ed Marinaro	RB	Cornell
1971	AFCA, AP, FWAA, NEA, UPI	Walt Patulski	DE	Notre Dame
1971	AFCA, AP, FWAA, NEA, UPI	Greg Pruitt	RB	Oklahoma
1971	AFCA, AP, FWAA, NEA, UPI	Jerry Sisemore	T	Texas
1971	AFCA, AP, FWAA, NEA, UPI	Royce Smith	G	Georgia
1971	AFCA, AP, FWAA, NEA, UPI	Pat Sullivan	QB	Auburn
1971	AFCA, AP, FWAA, NEA, UPI	Mike Taylor	LB	Michigan
1972	AFCA, AP, FWAA, NEA, UPI, WC	Rich Glover	NT	Nebraska
1972	AFCA, AP, FWAA, NEA, UPI, WC	John Hannah	G	Alabama
1972	AFCA, AP, FWAA, NEA, UPI, WC	Greg Marx	DT	Notre Dame
1972	AFCA, AP, FWAA, NEA, UPI, WC	Greg Pruitt	RB	Oklahoma
1972	AFCA, AP, FWAA, NEA, UPI, WC	Johnny Rodgers	WR	Nebraska
1972	AFCA, AP, FWAA, NEA, UPI, WC	Jerry Sisemore	T	Texas
1972	AFCA, AP, FWAA, NEA, UPI, WC	Brad Van Pelt	DB	Michigan State
1972	AFCA, AP, FWAA, NEA, UPI, WC	Charle Young	TE	USC
1973	AFCA, AP, FWAA, NEA, UPI, WC	John Cappelletti	RB	Penn State
1973	AFCA, AP, FWAA, NEA, UPI, WC	John Dutton	DE	Nebraska
1973	AFCA, AP, FWAA, NEA, UPI, WC	Randy Gradishar	LB	Ohio State
1973	AFCA, AP, FWAA, NEA, UPI, WC	John Hicks	G	Ohio State
1973	AFCA, AP, FWAA, NEA, UPI, WC	Lucious Selmon	NT	Oklahoma
1973	AFCA, AP, FWAA, NEA, UPI, WC	Bill Wyman	C	Texas
1974	AFCA, AP, FWAA, UPI, WC	Dave Brown	DB	Michigan
1974	AFCA, AP, FWAA, UPI, WC	Anthony Davis	RB	USC
1974	AFCA, AP, FWAA, UPI, WC	Archie Griffin	RB	Ohio State
1974	AFCA, AP, FWAA, UPI, WC	Rod Shoate	LB	Oklahoma
1974	AFCA, AP, FWAA, UPI, WC	Joe Washington	RB	Oklahoma
1974	AFCA, AP, FWAA, UPI, WC	Randy White	DE	Maryland
1975	AFCA, AP, FWAA, UPI	Ricky Bell	RB	USC
1975	AFCA, AP, FWAA, UPI	Rik Bonness	C	Nebraska
1975	AFCA, AP, FWAA, UPI	Leroy Cook	DE	Alabama
1975	AFCA, AP, FWAA, UPI	Archie Griffin	RB	Ohio State
1975	AFCA, AP, FWAA, UPI	Chet Moeller	DB	Navy
1975	AFCA, AP, FWAA, UPI	Steve Niehaus	DT	Notre Dame
1975	AFCA, AP, FWAA, UPI	Lee Roy Selmon	DT	Oklahoma
1975	AFCA, AP, FWAA, UPI	Ed Simonini	LB	Texas A&M
1976	AFCA, AP, FWAA, UPI	Bill Armstrong	DB	Wake Forest
1976	AFCA, AP, FWAA, UPI	Ricky Bell	RB	USC
1976	AFCA, AP, FWAA, UPI	Ross Browner	DE	Notre Dame
1976	AFCA, AP, FWAA, UPI	Tony Dorsett	RB	Pittsburgh
1976	AFCA, AP, FWAA, UPI	Robert Jackson	LB	Texas A&M
1976	AFCA, AP, FWAA, UPI	Mike Vaughan	T	Oklahoma
1977	AFCA, AP, FWAA, UPI	Ross Browner	DE	Notre Dame
1977	AFCA, AP, FWAA, UPI	Earl Campbell	RB	Texas
1977	AFCA, AP, FWAA, UPI	Mark Donahue	G	Michigan
1977	AFCA, AP, FWAA, UPI	Zac Henderson	DB	Oklahoma
1977	AFCA, AP, FWAA, UPI	Ken MacAfee	TE	Notre Dame
1977	AFCA, AP, FWAA, UPI	Terry Miller	RB	Oklahoma State
1977	AFCA, AP, FWAA, UPI	Jerry Robinson	LB	UCLA
1977	AFCA, AP, FWAA, UPI	Brad Shearer	DT	Texas
1977	AFCA, AP, FWAA, UPI	Art Still	DE	Kentucky
1977	AFCA, AP, FWAA, UPI	Dennis Thurman	DB	USC
1977	AFCA, AP, FWAA, UPI	Chris Ward	T	Ohio State
1978	AFCA, AP, FWAA, UPI	Bruce Clark	DT	Penn State
1978	AFCA, AP, FWAA, UPI	Keith Dorney	T	Penn State
1978	AFCA, AP, FWAA, UPI	Chuck Fusina	QB	Penn State
1978	AFCA, AP, FWAA, UPI	Bob Golic	LB	Notre Dame
1978	AFCA, AP, FWAA, UPI	Al Harris	DE	Arizona State
1978	AFCA, AP, FWAA, UPI	Pat Howell	G	USC
1978	AFCA, AP, FWAA, UPI	Johnnie Johnson	DB	Texas
1978	AFCA, AP, FWAA, UPI	Greg Roberts	G	Oklahoma
1978	AFCA, AP, FWAA, UPI	Jerry Robinson	LB	UCLA
1978	AFCA, AP, FWAA, UPI	Billy Sims	RB	Oklahoma
1978	AFCA, AP, FWAA, UPI	Charles White	RB	USC
1979	AFCA, AP, FWAA, UPI	Brad Budde	G	USC
1979	AFCA, AP, FWAA, UPI	George Cumby	LB	Oklahoma
1979	AFCA, AP, FWAA, UPI	Kenny Easley	DB	UCLA
1979	AFCA, AP, FWAA, UPI	Hugh Green	DE	Pittsburgh
1979	AFCA, AP, FWAA, UPI	Johnnie Johnson	DB	Texas
1979	AFCA, AP, FWAA, UPI	Greg Kolenda	T	Arkansas
1979	AFCA, AP, FWAA, UPI	Steve McMichael	DT	Texas
1979	AFCA, AP, FWAA, UPI	Junior Miller	TE	Nebraska
1979	AFCA, AP, FWAA, UPI	Jim Richter	C	NC State
1979	AFCA, AP, FWAA, UPI	Billy Sims	RB	Oklahoma
1979	AFCA, AP, FWAA, UPI	Charles White	RB	USC
1979	AFCA, AP, FWAA, UPI	Marc Wilson	QB	BYU
1980	AFCA, AP, FWAA, UPI	Kenny Easley	DB	UCLA
1980	AFCA, AP, FWAA, UPI	Hugh Green	DE	Pittsburgh
1980	AFCA, AP, FWAA, UPI	Mark Herrmann	QB	Purdue
1980	AFCA, AP, FWAA, UPI	E. J. Junior	DE	Alabama
1980	AFCA, AP, FWAA, UPI	Ronnie Lott	DB	USC
1980	AFCA, AP, FWAA, UPI	Ken Margerum	WR	Stanford
1980	AFCA, AP, FWAA, UPI	Mark May	T	Pittsburgh
1980	AFCA, AP, FWAA, UPI	George Rogers	RB	South Carolina
1980	AFCA, AP, FWAA, UPI	John Scully	C	Notre Dame
1980	AFCA, AP, FWAA, UPI	Mike Singletary	LB	Baylor
1980	AFCA, AP, FWAA, UPI	Lawrence Taylor	LB	North Carolina
1980	AFCA, AP, FWAA, UPI	Herschel Walker	RB	Georgia
1980	AFCA, AP, FWAA, UPI	Dave Young	TE	Purdue
1981	AFCA, AP, FWAA, UPI	Marcus Allen	RB	USC
1981	AFCA, AP, FWAA, UPI	Anthony Carter	WR	Michigan
1981	AFCA, AP, FWAA, UPI	Sean Farrell	G	Penn State
1981	AFCA, AP, FWAA, UPI	Jim McMahon	QB	BYU
1981	AFCA, AP, FWAA, UPI	Dave Rimington	C	Nebraska
1981	AFCA, AP, FWAA, UPI	Kenneth Sims	DT	Texas
1981	AFCA, AP, FWAA, UPI	Billy Ray Smith Jr.	DE	Arkansas
1981	AFCA, AP, FWAA, UPI	Herschel Walker	RB	Georgia
1981	AFCA, AP, FWAA, UPI	Tim Wrightman	TE	UCLA
1982	AFCA, AP, FWAA, UPI	Jim Arnold	P	Vanderbilt
1982	AFCA, AP, FWAA, UPI	Anthony Carter	WR	Michigan
1982	AFCA, AP, FWAA, UPI	Eric Dickerson	RB	SMU
1982	AFCA, AP, FWAA, UPI	John Elway	QB	Stanford
1982	AFCA, AP, FWAA, UPI	Gordon Hudson	TE	BYU
1982	AFCA, AP, FWAA, UPI	Terry Kinard	DB	Clemson
1982	AFCA, AP, FWAA, UPI	Steve Korte	G	Arkansas
1982	AFCA, AP, FWAA, UPI	Don Mosebar	T	USC
1982	AFCA, AP, FWAA, UPI	Chuck Nelson	K	Washington
1982	AFCA, AP, FWAA, UPI	Dave Rimington	C	Nebraska
1982	AFCA, AP, FWAA, UPI	Billy Ray Smith Jr.	DE	Arkansas
1982	AFCA, AP, FWAA, UPI	Darryl Talley	LB	West Virginia
1982	AFCA, AP, FWAA, UPI	Herschel Walker	RB	Georgia
1983	AFCA, AP, FWAA, UPI, WC	Rick Bryan	DT	Oklahoma
1983	AFCA, AP, FWAA, UPI, WC	Russell Carter	DB	SMU
1983	AFCA, AP, FWAA, UPI, WC	Bill Fralic	T	Pittsburgh
1983	AFCA, AP, FWAA, UPI, WC	Irving Fryar	WR	Nebraska
1983	AFCA, AP, FWAA, UPI, WC	Gordon Hudson	TE	BYU
1983	AFCA, AP, FWAA, UPI, WC	Ricky Hunley	LB	Arizona
1983	AFCA, AP, FWAA, UPI, WC	Mike Rozier	RB	Nebraska
1983	AFCA, AP, FWAA, UPI, WC	Reggie White	DT	Tennessee
1983	AFCA, AP, FWAA, UPI, WC	Steve Young	QB	BYU
1984	AFCA, AP, FWAA, UPI, WC	Ricky Anderson	P	Vanderbilt
1984	AFCA, AP, FWAA, UPI, WC	Keith Byars	RB	Ohio State
1984	AFCA, AP, FWAA, UPI, WC	Kenneth Davis	RB	TCU
1984	AFCA, AP, FWAA, UPI, WC	Doug Flutie	QB	Boston College
1984	AFCA, AP, FWAA, UPI, WC	Bill Fralic	T	Pittsburgh
1984	AFCA, AP, FWAA, UPI, WC	Jerry Gray	DB	Texas
1984	AFCA, AP, FWAA, UPI, WC	Mark Traynowicz	C	Nebraska
1984	AFCA, AP, FWAA, UPI, WC	David Williams	WR	Illinois
1985	AFCA, AP, FWAA, UPI, WC	Brian Bosworth	LB	Oklahoma
1985	AFCA, AP, FWAA, UPI, WC	Jim Dombrowski	T	Virginia
1985	AFCA, AP, FWAA, UPI, WC	Tim Green	DE	Syracuse
1985	AFCA, AP, FWAA, UPI, WC	Bo Jackson	RB	Auburn
1985	AFCA, AP, FWAA, UPI, WC	John Lee	K	UCLA
1985	AFCA, AP, FWAA, UPI, WC	Chuck Long	QB	Iowa
1985	AFCA, AP, FWAA, UPI, WC	Leslie O'Neal	DE	Oklahoma State
1985	AFCA, AP, FWAA, UPI, WC	Larry Station	LB	Iowa
1985	AFCA, AP, FWAA, UPI, WC	Lorenzo White	RB	Michigan State
1985	AFCA, AP, FWAA, UPI, WC	David Williams	WR	Illinois
1986	AFCA, AP, FWAA, UPI, WC	Cornelius Bennett	LB	Alabama
1986	AFCA, AP, FWAA, UPI, WC	Brian Bosworth	LB	Oklahoma
1986	AFCA, AP, FWAA, UPI, WC	Jerome Brown	DT	Miami (FL)
1986	AFCA, AP, FWAA, UPI, WC	Shane Conlan	LB	Penn State
1986	AFCA, AP, FWAA, UPI, WC	Thomas Everett	DB	Baylor
1986	AFCA, AP, FWAA, UPI, WC	Brent Fullwood	RB	Auburn
1986	AFCA, AP, FWAA, UPI, WC	Keith Jackson	TE	Oklahoma
1986	AFCA, AP, FWAA, UPI, WC	Danny Noonan	DT	Nebraska
1986	AFCA, AP, FWAA, UPI, WC	Paul Palmer	RB	Temple
1986	AFCA, AP, FWAA, UPI, WC	Ben Tamburello	C	Auburn
1986	AFCA, AP, FWAA, UPI, WC	Vinny Testaverde	QB	Miami (FL)
1987	AFCA, AP, FWAA, UPI, WC	Nacho Albergamo	C	LSU
1987	AFCA, AP, FWAA, UPI, WC	Bennie Blades	DB	Miami (FL)
1987	AFCA, AP, FWAA, UPI, WC	Tim Brown	WR	Notre Dame
1987	AFCA, AP, FWAA, UPI, WC	Chad Hennings	DT	Air Force
1987	AFCA, AP, FWAA, UPI, WC	Mark Hutson	G	Oklahoma
1987	AFCA, AP, FWAA, UPI, WC	Keith Jackson	TE	Oklahoma
1987	AFCA, AP, FWAA, UPI, WC	Don McPherson	QB	Syracuse
1987	AFCA, AP, FWAA, UPI, WC	Deion Sanders	DB	Florida State
1987	AFCA, AP, FWAA, UPI, WC	Chris Spielman	LB	Ohio State
1987	AFCA, AP, FWAA, UPI, WC	Danny Stubbs	DE	Miami (FL)
1987	AFCA, AP, FWAA, UPI, WC	Tom Tupa	P	Ohio State
1988	AFCA, AP, FWAA, UPI, WC	Tony Mandarich	T	Michigan State
1988	AFCA, AP, FWAA, UPI, WC	Mark Messner	DT	Michigan
1988	AFCA, AP, FWAA, UPI, WC	Anthony Phillips	G	Oklahoma
1988	AFCA, AP, FWAA, UPI, WC	Tracy Rocker	DT	Auburn
1988	AFCA, AP, FWAA, UPI, WC	Barry Sanders	RB	Oklahoma State
1988	AFCA, AP, FWAA, UPI, WC	Deion Sanders	DB	Florida State
1988	AFCA, AP, FWAA, UPI, WC	Broderick Thomas	LB	Nebraska
1988	AFCA, AP, FWAA, UPI, WC	Derrick Thomas	LB	Alabama
1989	AFCA, AP, FWAA, UPI, WC	Mark Carrier	DB	USC
1989	AFCA, AP, FWAA, UPI, WC	Moe Gardner	NT	Illinois
1989	AFCA, AP, FWAA, UPI, WC	Jason Hanson	K	Washington State
1989	AFCA, AP, FWAA, UPI, WC	Clarkston Hines	WR	Duke
1989	AFCA, AP, FWAA, UPI, WC	Todd Lyght	DB	Notre Dame
1989	AFCA, AP, FWAA, UPI, WC	Keith McCants	LB	Alabama
1989	AFCA, AP, FWAA, UPI, WC	Emmitt Smith	RB	Florida
1989	AFCA, AP, FWAA, UPI, WC	Percy Snow	LB	Michigan State
1989	AFCA, AP, FWAA, UPI, WC	Eric Still	G	Tennessee
1989	AFCA, AP, FWAA, UPI, WC	Anthony Thompson	RB	Indiana
1989	AFCA, AP, FWAA, UPI, WC	Tripp Welborne	DB	Michigan
1990	AFCA, AP, FWAA, UPI, WC	Eric Bieniemy	RB	Colorado
1990	AFCA, AP, FWAA, UPI, WC	Antone Davis	T	Tennessee
1990	AFCA, AP, FWAA, UPI, WC	Philip Doyle	K	Alabama
1990	AFCA, AP, FWAA, UPI, WC	Joe Garten	G	Colorado
1990	AFCA, AP, FWAA, UPI, WC	Raghib Ismail	WR	Notre Dame
1990	AFCA, AP, FWAA, UPI, WC	Ed King	G	Auburn
1990	AFCA, AP, FWAA, UPI, WC	Darryll Lewis	DB	Arizona
1990	AFCA, AP, FWAA, UPI, WC	Russell Maryland	DT	Miami (FL)
1990	AFCA, AP, FWAA, UPI, WC	Chris Smith	TE	BYU
1990	AFCA, AP, FWAA, UPI, WC	Michael Stonebreaker	LB	Notre Dame
1990	AFCA, AP, FWAA, UPI, WC	Ken Swilling	DB	Georgia Tech
1990	AFCA, AP, FWAA, UPI, WC	Tripp Welborne	DB	Michigan
1990	AFCA, AP, FWAA, UPI, WC	Alfred Williams	LB	Colorado
1990	AFCA, AP, FWAA, UPI, WC	Chris Zorich	DT	Notre Dame
1991	AFCA, AP, FWAA, UPI, WC	Mark Bounds	P	Texas Tech
1991	AFCA, AP, FWAA, UPI, WC	Terrell Buckley	DB	Florida State
1991	AFCA, AP, FWAA, UPI, WC	Santana Dotson	DE	Baylor
1991	AFCA, AP, FWAA, UPI, WC	Vaughn Dunbar	RB	Indiana
1991	AFCA, AP, FWAA, UPI, WC	Steve Emtman	DE	Washington
1991	AFCA, AP, FWAA, UPI, WC	Desmond Howard	WR	Michigan
1991	AFCA, AP, FWAA, UPI, WC	Robert Jones	LB	East Carolina
1991	AFCA, AP, FWAA, UPI, WC	Jay Leeuwenburg	C	Colorado
1991	AFCA, AP, FWAA, UPI, WC	Greg Skrepenak	T	Michigan
1992	AFCA, AP, FWAA, UPI, WC	Marcus Buckley	LB	Texas A&M
1992	AFCA, AP, FWAA, UPI, WC	Marshall Faulk	RB	San Diego State
1992	AFCA, AP, FWAA, UPI, WC	Chris Gedney	TE	Syracuse
1992	AFCA, AP, FWAA, UPI, WC	Garrison Hearst	RB	Georgia
1992	AFCA, AP, FWAA, UPI, WC	Marvin Jones	LB	Florida State
1992	AFCA, AP, FWAA, UPI, WC	Lincoln Kennedy	T	Washington
1992	AFCA, AP, FWAA, UPI, WC	Carlton McDonald	DB	Air Force
1992	AFCA, AP, FWAA, UPI, WC	Will Shields	G	Nebraska
1992	AFCA, AP, FWAA, UPI, WC	Gino Torretta	QB	Miami (FL)
1993	AFCA, AP, FN, FWAA, UPI, SN, WC	Trev Alberts	LB	Nebraska
1993	AFCA, AP, FN, FWAA, UPI, SN, WC	Derrick Brooks	LB	Florida State
1993	AFCA, AP, FN, FWAA, UPI, SN, WC	Marshall Faulk	RB	San Diego State
1993	AFCA, AP, FN, FWAA, UPI, SN, WC	LeShon Johnson	RB	Northern Illinois
1993	AFCA, AP, FN, FWAA, UPI, SN, WC	Antonio Langham	DB	Alabama
1993	AFCA, AP, FN, FWAA, UPI, SN, WC	Jim Pyne	C	Virginia Tech
1993	AFCA, AP, FN, FWAA, UPI, SN, WC	J. J. Stokes	WR	UCLA
1993	AFCA, AP, FN, FWAA, UPI, SN, WC	Aaron Taylor	T	Notre Dame
1993	AFCA, AP, FN, FWAA, UPI, SN, WC	Rob Waldrop	DT	Arizona
1993	AFCA, AP, FN, FWAA, UPI, SN, WC	Charlie Ward	QB	Florida State
1994	AFCA, AP, FN, FWAA, UPI, SN, WC	Ki-Jana Carter	RB	Penn State
1994	AFCA, AP, FN, FWAA, UPI, SN, WC	Dana Howard	LB	Illinois
1994	AFCA, AP, FN, FWAA, UPI, SN, WC	Rashaan Salaam	RB	Colorado
1994	AFCA, AP, FN, FWAA, UPI, SN, WC	Warren Sapp	DT	Miami (FL)
1994	AFCA, AP, FN, FWAA, UPI, SN, WC	Todd Sauerbrun	P	West Virginia
1994	AFCA, AP, FN, FWAA, UPI, SN, WC	Zach Wiegert	G	Nebraska
1995	AFCA, AP, FN, FWAA, UPI, SN, WC	Marco Battaglia	TE	Rutgers
1995	AFCA, AP, FN, FWAA, UPI, SN, WC	Tedy Bruschi	DT	Arizona
1995	AFCA, AP, FN, FWAA, UPI, SN, WC	Eddie George	RB	Ohio State
1995	AFCA, AP, FN, FWAA, UPI, SN, WC	Keyshawn Johnson	WR	USC
1995	AFCA, AP, FN, FWAA, UPI, SN, WC	Lawyer Milloy	DB	Washington
1995	AFCA, AP, FN, FWAA, UPI, SN, WC	Jason Odom	T	Florida
1995	AFCA, AP, FN, FWAA, UPI, SN, WC	Jonathan Ogden	T	UCLA
1995	AFCA, AP, FN, FWAA, UPI, SN, WC	Orlando Pace	T	Ohio State
1995	AFCA, AP, FN, FWAA, UPI, SN, WC	Zach Thomas	LB	Texas Tech
1996	AFCA, AP, FN, FWAA, UPI, SN, WC	Chris Canty	DB	Kansas State
1996	AFCA, AP, FN, FWAA, UPI, SN, WC	Kevin Jackson	DB	Alabama
1996	AFCA, AP, FN, FWAA, UPI, SN, WC	Byron Hanspard	RB	Texas Tech
1996	AFCA, AP, FN, FWAA, UPI, SN, WC	Orlando Pace	T	Ohio State
1997	AFCA, AP, FN, FWAA, SN, WC	Randy Moss	WR	Marshall
1997	AFCA, AP, FN, FWAA, SN, WC	Aaron Taylor	G	Nebraska
1997	AFCA, AP, FN, FWAA, SN, WC	Ricky Williams	RB	Texas
1997	AFCA, AP, FN, FWAA, SN, WC	Charles Woodson	DB	Michigan
1998	AFCA, AP, FN, FWAA, SN, WC	Tom Burke	DE	Wisconsin
1998	AFCA, AP, FN, FWAA, SN, WC	Chris Claiborne	LB	USC
1998	AFCA, AP, FN, FWAA, SN, WC	Rufus French	TE	Ole Miss
1998	AFCA, AP, FN, FWAA, SN, WC	Dat Nguyen	LB	Texas A&M
1998	AFCA, AP, FN, FWAA, SN, WC	Chris McAlister	DB	Arizona
1998	AFCA, AP, FN, FWAA, SN, WC	Ricky Williams	RB	Texas
1998	AFCA, AP, FN, FWAA, SN, WC	Antoine Winfield	DB	Ohio State
1999	AFCA, AP, FN, FWAA, SN, WC	Lavar Arrington	LB	Penn State
1999	AFCA, AP, FN, FWAA, SN, WC	Courtney Brown	DE	Penn State
1999	AFCA, AP, FN, FWAA, SN, WC	Ron Dayne	RB	Wisconsin
1999	AFCA, AP, FN, FWAA, SN, WC	Sebastian Janikowski	K	Florida State
1999	AFCA, AP, FN, FWAA, SN, WC	Chris McIntosh	T	Wisconsin
1999	AFCA, AP, FN, FWAA, SN, WC	Corey Moore	DE	Virginia Tech
1999	AFCA, AP, FN, FWAA, SN, WC	Chris Samuels	T	Alabama
1999	AFCA, AP, FN, FWAA, SN, WC	Peter Warrick	WR	Florida State
2000	AFCA, AP, FN, FWAA, SN, WC	Andre Carter	DE	California
2000	AFCA, AP, FN, FWAA, SN, WC	Steve Hutchinson	G	Michigan
2000	AFCA, AP, FN, FWAA, SN, WC	Dan Morgan	LB	Miami (FL)
2000	AFCA, AP, FN, FWAA, SN, WC	Brian Natkin	TE	UTEP
2000	AFCA, AP, FN, FWAA, SN, WC	Jamal Reynolds	DE	Florida State
2000	AFCA, AP, FN, FWAA, SN, WC	LaDainian Tomlinson	RB	TCU
2001	AFCA, AP, CNN, FN, FWAA, SN, WC	Dwight Freeney	DE	Syracuse
2001	AFCA, AP, CNN, FN, FWAA, SN, WC	Jabar Gaffney	WR	Florida
2001	AFCA, AP, CNN, FN, FWAA, SN, WC	Quentin Jammer	DB	Texas
2001	AFCA, AP, CNN, FN, FWAA, SN, WC	Bryant McKinnie	T	Miami (FL)
2001	AFCA, AP, CNN, FN, FWAA, SN, WC	Julius Peppers	DE	North Carolina
2001	AFCA, AP, CNN, FN, FWAA, SN, WC	Ed Reed	DB	Miami (FL)
2001	AFCA, AP, CNN, FN, FWAA, SN, WC	Roy Williams	DB	Oklahoma
2002	AFCA, AP, FWAA, SN, WC	Dallas Clark	TE	Iowa
2002	AFCA, AP, FWAA, SN, WC	Mike Doss	DB	Ohio State
2002	AFCA, AP, FWAA, SN, WC	Larry Johnson	RB	Penn State
2002	AFCA, AP, FWAA, SN, WC	Terence Newman	DB	Kansas State
2002	AFCA, AP, FWAA, SN, WC	Charles Rogers	WR	Michigan State
2002	AFCA, AP, FWAA, SN, WC	Terrell Suggs	DE	Arizona State
2002	AFCA, AP, FWAA, SN, WC	Shane Walton	DB	Notre Dame
2003	AFCA, AP, FWAA, SN, WC	Shawn Andrews	T	Arkansas
2003	AFCA, AP, FWAA, SN, WC	Dave Ball	DE	UCLA
2003	AFCA, AP, FWAA, SN, WC	Larry Fitzgerald	WR	Pittsburgh
2003	AFCA, AP, FWAA, SN, WC	Robert Gallery	T	Iowa
2003	AFCA, AP, FWAA, SN, WC	Jake Grove	C	Virginia Tech
2003	AFCA, AP, FWAA, SN, WC	Tommie Harris	T	Oklahoma
2003	AFCA, AP, FWAA, SN, WC	Teddy Lehman	LB	Oklahoma
2003	AFCA, AP, FWAA, SN, WC	Antonio Perkins	RS	Oklahoma
2003	AFCA, AP, FWAA, SN, WC	Derrick Strait	DB	Oklahoma
2003	AFCA, AP, FWAA, SN, WC	Sean Taylor	DB	Miami (FL)
2003	AFCA, AP, FWAA, SN, WC	Jason White	QB	Oklahoma
2003	AFCA, AP, FWAA, SN, WC	Kellen Winslow II	TE	Miami (FL)
2004	AFCA, AP, FWAA, SN, WC	Alex Barron	T	Florida State
2004	AFCA, AP, FWAA, SN, WC	Jammal Brown	T	Oklahoma
2004	AFCA, AP, FWAA, SN, WC	Braylon Edwards	WR	Michigan
2004	AFCA, AP, FWAA, SN, WC	Derrick Johnson	LB	Texas
2004	AFCA, AP, FWAA, SN, WC	Heath Miller	TE	Virginia
2004	AFCA, AP, FWAA, SN, WC	Mike Nugent	K	Ohio State
2004	AFCA, AP, FWAA, SN, WC	Adrian Peterson	RB	Oklahoma
2004	AFCA, AP, FWAA, SN, WC	Antrel Rolle	DB	Miami (FL)
2005	AFCA, AP, FWAA, SN, WC	Reggie Bush	RB	USC
2005	AFCA, AP, FWAA, SN, WC	Maurice Drew	All-purpose	UCLA
2005	AFCA, AP, FWAA, SN, WC	Elvis Dumervil	DE	Louisville
2005	AFCA, AP, FWAA, SN, WC	Greg Eslinger	C	Minnesota
2005	AFCA, AP, FWAA, SN, WC	Tamba Hali	DE	Penn State
2005	AFCA, AP, FWAA, SN, WC	A. J. Hawk	LB	Ohio State
2005	AFCA, AP, FWAA, SN, WC	Michael Huff	DB	Texas
2005	AFCA, AP, FWAA, SN, WC	Dwayne Jarrett	WR	USC
2005	AFCA, AP, FWAA, SN, WC	Ryan Plackemeier	P	Wake Forest
2005	AFCA, AP, FWAA, SN, WC	Demeco Ryans	LB	Alabama
2005	AFCA, AP, FWAA, SN, WC	Jonathan Scott	T	Texas
2005	AFCA, AP, FWAA, SN, WC	Jimmy Williams	DB	Virginia Tech
2006	AFCA, AP, FWAA, SN, WC	Gaines Adams	DE	Clemson
2006	AFCA, AP, FWAA, SN, WC	Calvin Johnson	WR	Georgia Tech
2006	AFCA, AP, FWAA, SN, WC	Dan Mozes	C	West Virginia
2006	AFCA, AP, FWAA, SN, WC	Daniel Sepulveda	P	Baylor
2006	AFCA, AP, FWAA, SN, WC	Steve Slaton	RB	West Virginia
2006	AFCA, AP, FWAA, SN, WC	Troy Smith	QB	Ohio State
2006	AFCA, AP, FWAA, SN, WC	Joe Thomas	T	Wisconsin
2006	AFCA, AP, FWAA, SN, WC	LaMarr Woodley	DE	Michigan
2007	AFCA, AP, FWAA, SN, WC	Michael Crabtree	WR	Texas Tech
2007	AFCA, AP, FWAA, SN, WC	Glenn Dorsey	DT	LSU
2007	AFCA, AP, FWAA, SN, WC	Sedrick Ellis	DT	USC
2007	AFCA, AP, FWAA, SN, WC	James Laurinaitis	LB	Ohio State
2007	AFCA, AP, FWAA, SN, WC	Chris Long	DE	Virginia
2007	AFCA, AP, FWAA, SN, WC	Jake Long	T	Michigan
2007	AFCA, AP, FWAA, SN, WC	Darren McFadden	RB	Arkansas
2007	AFCA, AP, FWAA, SN, WC	Aqib Talib	DB	Kansas
2008	AFCA, AP, FWAA, SN, WC	Eric Berry	DB	Tennessee
2008	AFCA, AP, FWAA, SN, WC	Michael Crabtree	WR	Texas Tech
2008	AFCA, AP, FWAA, SN, WC	Shonn Greene	RB	Iowa
2008	AFCA, AP, FWAA, SN, WC	Rey Maualuga	LB	USC
2008	AFCA, AP, FWAA, SN, WC	Michael Oher	T	Ole Miss
2008	AFCA, AP, FWAA, SN, WC	Brian Orakpo	DE	Texas
2008	AFCA, AP, FWAA, SN, WC	Louie Sakoda	K	Utah
2008	AFCA, AP, FWAA, SN, WC	Andre Smith	T	Alabama
2008	AFCA, AP, FWAA, SN, WC	Brandon Spikes	LB	Florida
2009	AFCA, AP, FWAA, SN, WC	Eric Berry	DB	Tennessee
2009	AFCA, AP, FWAA, SN, WC	Drew Butler	P	Georgia
2009	AFCA, AP, FWAA, SN, WC	Toby Gerhart	RB	Stanford
2009	AFCA, AP, FWAA, SN, WC	Joe Haden	DB	Florida
2009	AFCA, AP, FWAA, SN, WC	Jerry Hughes	DE	TCU
2009	AFCA, AP, FWAA, SN, WC	Mark Ingram II	RB	Alabama
2009	AFCA, AP, FWAA, SN, WC	Rolando McClain	LB	Alabama
2009	AFCA, AP, FWAA, SN, WC	Colt McCoy	QB	Texas
2009	AFCA, AP, FWAA, SN, WC	Russell Okung	T	Oklahoma State
2009	AFCA, AP, FWAA, SN, WC	C. J. Spiller	All-purpose	Clemson
2009	AFCA, AP, FWAA, SN, WC	Ndamukong Suh	DT	Nebraska
2009	AFCA, AP, FWAA, SN, WC	Golden Tate	WR	Notre Dame
2010	AFCA, AP, FWAA, SN, WC	Prince Amukamara	DB	Nebraska
2010	AFCA, AP, FWAA, SN, WC	Justin Blackmon	WR	Oklahoma State
2010	AFCA, AP, FWAA, SN, WC	Da'Quan Bowers	DE	Clemson
2010	AFCA, AP, FWAA, SN, WC	Gabe Carimi	T	Wisconsin
2010	AFCA, AP, FWAA, SN, WC	Rodney Hudson	G	Florida State
2010	AFCA, AP, FWAA, SN, WC	LaMichael James	RB	Oregon
2010	AFCA, AP, FWAA, SN, WC	Greg Jones	LB	Michigan State
2010	AFCA, AP, FWAA, SN, WC	Ryan Kerrigan	DE	Purdue
2010	AFCA, AP, FWAA, SN, WC	Luke Kuechly	LB	Boston College
2010	AFCA, AP, FWAA, SN, WC	Patrick Peterson	DB	LSU
2011	AFCA, AP, FWAA, SN, WC	Mark Barron	DB	Alabama
2011	AFCA, AP, FWAA, SN, WC	Justin Blackmon	WR	Oklahoma State
2011	AFCA, AP, FWAA, SN, WC	Morris Claiborne	DB	LSU
2011	AFCA, AP, FWAA, SN, WC	David DeCastro	G	Stanford
2011	AFCA, AP, FWAA, SN, WC	Barrett Jones	T	Alabama
2011	AFCA, AP, FWAA, SN, WC	Whitney Mercilus	DE	Illinois
2011	AFCA, AP, FWAA, SN, WC	Trent Richardson	RB	Alabama
2012	AFCA, AP, FWAA, SN, WC	Ryan Allen	P	Louisiana Tech
2012	AFCA, AP, FWAA, SN, WC	Jadeveon Clowney	DE	South Carolina
2012	AFCA, AP, FWAA, SN, WC	Jonathan Cooper	G	North Carolina
2012	AFCA, AP, FWAA, SN, WC	Zach Ertz	TE	Stanford
2012	AFCA, AP, FWAA, SN, WC	Luke Joeckel	T	Texas A&M
2012	AFCA, AP, FWAA, SN, WC	Jarvis Jones	LB	Georgia
2012	AFCA, AP, FWAA, SN, WC	Marqise Lee	WR	USC
2012	AFCA, AP, FWAA, SN, WC	Dee Milliner	DB	Alabama
2012	AFCA, AP, FWAA, SN, WC	Manti Te'o	LB	Notre Dame
2012	AFCA, AP, FWAA, SN, WC	Phillip Thomas	DB	Fresno State
2012	AFCA, AP, FWAA, SN, WC	Chance Warmack	G	Alabama
2012	AFCA, AP, FWAA, SN, WC	Björn Werner	DE	Florida State
2012	AFCA, AP, FWAA, SN, WC	Terrance Williams	WR	Baylor
2013	AFCA, AP, FWAA, SN, WC	Jace Amaro	TE	Texas Tech
2013	AFCA, AP, FWAA, SN, WC	Darqueze Dennard	DB	Michigan State
2013	AFCA, AP, FWAA, SN, WC	Aaron Donald	DT	Pittsburgh
2013	AFCA, AP, FWAA, SN, WC	Lamarcus Joyner	DB	Florida State
2013	AFCA, AP, FWAA, SN, WC	Jake Matthews	T	Texas A&M
2013	AFCA, AP, FWAA, SN, WC	C. J. Mosley	LB	Alabama
2013	AFCA, AP, FWAA, SN, WC	Cyril Richardson	G	Baylor
2013	AFCA, AP, FWAA, SN, WC	Michael Sam	DE	Missouri
2013	AFCA, AP, FWAA, SN, WC	Andre Williams	RB	Boston College
2013	AFCA, AP, FWAA, SN, WC	David Yankey	G	Stanford
2014	AFCA, AP, FWAA, SN, WC	Joey Bosa	DE	Ohio State
2014	AFCA, AP, FWAA, SN, WC	Tevin Coleman	RB	Indiana
2014	AFCA, AP, FWAA, SN, WC	Landon Collins	DB	Alabama
2014	AFCA, AP, FWAA, SN, WC	Amari Cooper	WR	Alabama
2014	AFCA, AP, FWAA, SN, WC	Senquez Golson	DB	Ole Miss
2014	AFCA, AP, FWAA, SN, WC	Melvin Gordon	RB	Wisconsin
2014	AFCA, AP, FWAA, SN, WC	Gerod Holliman	DB	Louisville
2014	AFCA, AP, FWAA, SN, WC	Tre' Jackson	G	Florida State
2014	AFCA, AP, FWAA, SN, WC	Hau'oli Kikaha	LB	Washington
2014	AFCA, AP, FWAA, SN, WC	Marcus Mariota	QB	Oregon
2014	AFCA, AP, FWAA, SN, WC	Brandon Scherff	G	Iowa
2014	AFCA, AP, FWAA, SN, WC	Scooby Wright III	LB	Arizona
2015	AFCA, AP, FWAA, SN, WC	Jeremy Cash	DB	Duke
2015	AFCA, AP, FWAA, SN, WC	Corey Coleman	WR	Baylor
2015	AFCA, AP, FWAA, SN, WC	Josh Doctson	WR	TCU
2015	AFCA, AP, FWAA, SN, WC	Spencer Drango	T	Baylor
2015	AFCA, AP, FWAA, SN, WC	Joshua Garnett	G	Stanford
2015	AFCA, AP, FWAA, SN, WC	Tom Hackett	P	Utah
2015	AFCA, AP, FWAA, SN, WC	Vernon Hargreaves	DB	Florida
2015	AFCA, AP, FWAA, SN, WC	Derrick Henry	RB	Alabama
2015	AFCA, AP, FWAA, SN, WC	Hunter Henry	TE	Arkansas
2015	AFCA, AP, FWAA, SN, WC	Desmond King	DB	Iowa
2015	AFCA, AP, FWAA, SN, WC	Carl Nassib	DE	Penn State
2015	AFCA, AP, FWAA, SN, WC	Reggie Ragland	LB	Alabama
2016	AFCA, AP, FWAA, SN, WC	Jonathan Allen	DE	Alabama
2016	AFCA, AP, FWAA, SN, WC	Dalvin Cook	RB	Florida State
2016	AFCA, AP, FWAA, SN, WC	Zach Cunningham	LB	Vanderbilt
2016	AFCA, AP, FWAA, SN, WC	Pat Elflein	C	Ohio State
2016	AFCA, AP, FWAA, SN, WC	Reuben Foster	LB	Alabama
2016	AFCA, AP, FWAA, SN, WC	Myles Garrett	DE	Texas A&M
2016	AFCA, AP, FWAA, SN, WC	Zane Gonzalez	K	Arizona State
2016	AFCA, AP, FWAA, SN, WC	Malik Hooker	DB	Ohio State
2016	AFCA, AP, FWAA, SN, WC	Lamar Jackson	QB	Louisville
2016	AFCA, AP, FWAA, SN, WC	Cody O'Connell	T	Washington State
2016	AFCA, AP, FWAA, SN, WC	Jabrill Peppers	LB	Michigan
2016	AFCA, AP, FWAA, SN, WC	Cam Robinson	T	Alabama
2016	AFCA, AP, FWAA, SN, WC	Dede Westbrook	WR	Oklahoma
2016	AFCA, AP, FWAA, SN, WC	Mitch Wishnowsky	P	Utah
2017	AFCA, AP, FWAA, SN, WC			
2017	AFCA, AP, FWAA, SN, WC	Mark Andrews	TE	Oklahoma
2017	AFCA, AP, FWAA, SN, WC	Orlando Brown Jr.	T	Oklahoma
2017	AFCA, AP, FWAA, SN, WC	Bradley Chubb	DE	NC State
2017	AFCA, AP, FWAA, SN, WC	Michael Dickson	P	Texas
2017	AFCA, AP, FWAA, SN, WC	DeShon Elliott	DB	Texas
2017	AFCA, AP, FWAA, SN, WC	Minkah Fitzpatrick	DB	Alabama
2017	AFCA, AP, FWAA, SN, WC	Josh Jackson	DB	Iowa
2017	AFCA, AP, FWAA, SN, WC	Josey Jewell	LB	Iowa
2017	AFCA, AP, FWAA, SN, WC	Bryce Love	RB	Stanford
2017	AFCA, AP, FWAA, SN, WC	Baker Mayfield	QB	Oklahoma
2017	AFCA, AP, FWAA, SN, WC	Quenton Nelson	G	Notre Dame
2017	AFCA, AP, FWAA, SN, WC	Billy Price	C	Ohio State
2017	AFCA, AP, FWAA, SN, WC	Roquan Smith	LB	Georgia
2017	AFCA, AP, FWAA, SN, WC	James Washington	WR	Oklahoma State
2018	AFCA, AP, FWAA, SN, WC			
2018	AFCA, AP, FWAA, SN, WC	Josh Allen	LB	Kentucky
2018	AFCA, AP, FWAA, SN, WC	Grant Delpit	DB	LSU
2018	AFCA, AP, FWAA, SN, WC	Braden Mann	P	Texas A&M
2018	AFCA, AP, FWAA, SN, WC	Andre Szmyt	K	Syracuse
2018	AFCA, AP, FWAA, SN, WC	Jonathan Taylor	RB	Wisconsin
2018	AFCA, AP, FWAA, SN, WC	Christian Wilkins	DT	Clemson
2018	AFCA, AP, FWAA, SN, WC	Jonah Williams	OT	Alabama
2018	AFCA, AP, FWAA, SN, WC	Quinnen Williams	DT	Alabama
2019	AFCA, AP, FWAA, SN, WC			
2019	AFCA, AP, FWAA, SN, WC	Joe Burrow	QB	LSU
2019	AFCA, AP, FWAA, SN, WC	Chuba Hubbard	RB	Oklahoma State
2019	AFCA, AP, FWAA, SN, WC	Jonathan Taylor	RB	Wisconsin
2019	AFCA, AP, FWAA, SN, WC	Ja'Marr Chase	WR	LSU
2019	AFCA, AP, FWAA, SN, WC	Harrison Bryant	TE	Florida Atlantic
2019	AFCA, AP, FWAA, SN, WC	Penei Sewell	OL	Oregon
2019	AFCA, AP, FWAA, SN, WC	Andrew Thomas	OL	Georgia
2019	AFCA, AP, FWAA, SN, WC	Tyler Biadasz	OL	Wisconsin
2019	AFCA, AP, FWAA, SN, WC	Chase Young	DE	Ohio State
2019	AFCA, AP, FWAA, SN, WC	James Lynch	DL	Baylor
2019	AFCA, AP, FWAA, SN, WC	Derrick Brown	DL	Auburn
2019	AFCA, AP, FWAA, SN, WC	Isaiah Simmons	LB	Clemson
2019	AFCA, AP, FWAA, SN, WC	Evan Weaver	LB	California
2019	AFCA, AP, FWAA, SN, WC	Jeff Okudah	DB	Ohio State
2019	AFCA, AP, FWAA, SN, WC	Antoine Winfield Jr.	DB	Minnesota
2019	AFCA, AP, FWAA, SN, WC	Max Duffy	P	Kentucky
2020	AFCA, AP, FWAA, SN, WC			
2020	AFCA, AP, FWAA, SN, WC	Breece Hall	RB	Iowa State
2020	AFCA, AP, FWAA, SN, WC	Najee Harris	RB	Alabama
2020	AFCA, AP, FWAA, SN, WC	DeVonta Smith	WR	Alabama
2020	AFCA, AP, FWAA, SN, WC	Kyle Pitts	TE	Florida
2020	AFCA, AP, FWAA, SN, WC	Landon Dickerson	C	Alabama
2020	AFCA, AP, FWAA, SN, WC	Wyatt Davis	OL	Ohio State
2020	AFCA, AP, FWAA, SN, WC	Alex Leatherwood	OL	Alabama
2020	AFCA, AP, FWAA, SN, WC	Daviyon Nixon	DL	Iowa
2020	AFCA, AP, FWAA, SN, WC	Zaven Collins	LB	Tulsa
2020	AFCA, AP, FWAA, SN, WC	Jeremiah Owusu-Koramoah	LB	Notre Dame
2020	AFCA, AP, FWAA, SN, WC	Patrick Surtain II	DB	Alabama
2020	AFCA, AP, FWAA, SN, WC	José Borregales	K	Miami (FL)
2020	AFCA, AP, FWAA, SN, WC	Pressley Harvin III	P	Georgia Tech
2021	AFCA, AP, FWAA, SN, WC			
2021	AFCA, AP, FWAA, SN, WC	Tyler Linderbaum	C	Iowa
2021	AFCA, AP, FWAA, SN, WC	Ikem Ekwonu	OL	NC State
2021	AFCA, AP, FWAA, SN, WC	Kenneth Walker III	HB	Michigan State
2021	AFCA, AP, FWAA, SN, WC	Trey McBride	TE	Colorado State
2021	AFCA, AP, FWAA, SN, WC	Jordan Davis	DL	Georgia
2021	AFCA, AP, FWAA, SN, WC	Aidan Hutchinson	DL	Michigan
2021	AFCA, AP, FWAA, SN, WC	Kayvon Thibodeaux	DL	Oregon
2021	AFCA, AP, FWAA, SN, WC	Will Anderson Jr.	LB	Alabama
2021	AFCA, AP, FWAA, SN, WC	Nakobe Dean	LB	Georgia
2021	AFCA, AP, FWAA, SN, WC	Matt Araiza	P	San Diego State
2022	AFCA, AP, FWAA, SN, WC			
2022	AFCA, AP, FWAA, SN, WC	Caleb Williams	QB	USC
2022	AFCA, AP, FWAA, SN, WC	Blake Corum	RB	Michigan
2022	AFCA, AP, FWAA, SN, WC	Bijan Robinson	RB	Texas
2022	AFCA, AP, FWAA, SN, WC	Marvin Harrison Jr.	WR	Ohio State
2022	AFCA, AP, FWAA, SN, WC	Jalin Hyatt	WR	Tennessee
2022	AFCA, AP, FWAA, SN, WC	Peter Skoronski	OL	Northwestern
2022	AFCA, AP, FWAA, SN, WC	Jalen Carter	DL	Georgia
2022	AFCA, AP, FWAA, SN, WC	Calijah Kancey	DL	Pittsburgh
2022	AFCA, AP, FWAA, SN, WC	Tuli Tuipulotu	DL	USC
2022	AFCA, AP, FWAA, SN, WC	Will Anderson Jr.	LB	Alabama
2022	AFCA, AP, FWAA, SN, WC	Jack Campbell	LB	Iowa
2022	AFCA, AP, FWAA, SN, WC	Ivan Pace Jr.	LB	Cincinnati
2022	AFCA, AP, FWAA, SN, WC	Clark Phillips III	DB	Utah
2022	AFCA, AP, FWAA, SN, WC	Christopher Smith II	DB	Georgia
2023	AFCA, AP, FWAA, SN, WC	Ollie Gordon II	RB	Oklahoma State
2023	AFCA, AP, FWAA, SN, WC	Marvin Harrison Jr.	WR	Ohio State
2023	AFCA, AP, FWAA, SN, WC	Malik Nabers	WR	LSU
2023	AFCA, AP, FWAA, SN, WC	Brock Bowers	TE	Georgia
2023	AFCA, AP, FWAA, SN, WC	Joe Alt	OL	Notre Dame
2023	AFCA, AP, FWAA, SN, WC	Cooper Beebe	OL	Kansas State
2023	AFCA, AP, FWAA, SN, WC	Jackson Powers-Johnson	OL	Oregon
2023	AFCA, AP, FWAA, SN, WC	Zak Zinter	OL	Michigan
2023	AFCA, AP, FWAA, SN, WC	Laiatu Latu	DL	UCLA
2023	AFCA, AP, FWAA, SN, WC	T'Vondre Sweat	DL	Texas
2023	AFCA, AP, FWAA, SN, WC	Payton Wilson	LB	NC State
2023	AFCA, AP, FWAA, SN, WC	Cooper DeJean	DB	Iowa
2023	AFCA, AP, FWAA, SN, WC	Xavier Watts	DB	Notre Dame
2023	AFCA, AP, FWAA, SN, WC	Tory Taylor	P	Iowa
2024	AFCA, AP, FWAA, SN, WC	Ashton Jeanty	RB	Boise State
2024	AFCA, AP, FWAA, SN, WC	Nick Nash	WR	San Jose State
2024	AFCA, AP, FWAA, SN, WC	Kelvin Banks Jr.	OL	Texas
2024	AFCA, AP, FWAA, SN, WC	Abdul Carter	DL	Penn State
2024	AFCA, AP, FWAA, SN, WC	Mason Graham	DL	Michigan
2024	AFCA, AP, FWAA, SN, WC	Jay Higgins	LB	Iowa
2024	AFCA, AP, FWAA, SN, WC	Caleb Downs	DB	Ohio State
2024	AFCA, AP, FWAA, SN, WC	Travis Hunter	WR/DB	Colorado
2025	AFCA, AP, FWAA, SN, WC	Jeremiyah Love	RB	Notre Dame
2025	AFCA, AP, FWAA, SN, WC	Makai Lemon	WR	USC
2025	AFCA, AP, FWAA, SN, WC	Jeremiah Smith	WR	Ohio State
2025	AFCA, AP, FWAA, SN, WC	Eli Stowers	TE	Vanderbilt
2025	AFCA, AP, FWAA, SN, WC	Spencer Fano	OL	Utah
2025	AFCA, AP, FWAA, SN, WC	Logan Jones	OL	Iowa
2025	AFCA, AP, FWAA, SN, WC	David Bailey	DL	Texas Tech
2025	AFCA, AP, FWAA, SN, WC	Cashius Howell	DL	Texas A&M
2025	AFCA, AP, FWAA, SN, WC	Kayden McDonald	DL	Ohio State
2025	AFCA, AP, FWAA, SN, WC	Jacob Rodriguez	LB	Texas Tech
2025	AFCA, AP, FWAA, SN, WC	Mansoor Delane	DB	LSU
2025	AFCA, AP, FWAA, SN, WC	Caleb Downs	DB	Ohio State
2025	AFCA, AP, FWAA, SN, WC	Leonard Moore	DB	Notre Dame

== Unanimous selections by school ==
1. Ohio State: 42
2. Alabama: 41
3. Notre Dame: 41
4. Oklahoma: 35
5. USC: 30
6. Michigan: 29
7. Texas: 27
8. Nebraska: 21
9. Iowa: 17
10. Georgia: 16
11. Miami (FL): 16
12. Florida State: 15
13. Penn State: 15
14. Pittsburgh: 15
15. LSU: 14
16. Tennessee: 14
17. UCLA: 13
18. Wisconsin: 12
19. Michigan State: 11
20. Baylor: 10
21. Stanford: 10
22. Texas A&M: 10
23. Arkansas: 9
24. Auburn: 9
25. Oklahoma State: 9
26. Army: 8
27. Florida: 8
28. Illinois: 8
29. Minnesota: 8
30. Syracuse: 8
31. Texas Tech: 8
32. Purdue: 7
33. TCU: 7
34. Arizona: 6
35. BYU: 6
36. Colorado: 6
37. Clemson: 6
38. Navy: 6
39. Oregon: 6
40. Maryland: 5
41. NC State: 5
42. Ole Miss: 5
43. Utah: 5
44. Washington: 5
45. Vanderbilt: 4
46. Virginia Tech: 4
47. West Virginia: 4
48. Arizona State: 3
49. Boston College: 3
50. California: 3
51. Georgia Tech: 3
52. Indiana: 3
53. Kansas State: 3
54. Kentucky: 3
55. Louisville: 3
56. North Carolina: 3
57. San Diego State: 3
58. SMU: 3
59. Virginia: 3
60. Air Force: 2
61. Cornell: 2
62. Duke: 2
63. Harvard: 2
64. Missouri: 2
65. Oregon State: 2
66. South Carolina: 2
67. Tulsa: 2
68. Wake Forest: 2
69. Washington State: 2
70. Yale: 2
71. Boise State: 1
72. Chicago: 1
73. Cincinnati: 1
74. Colorado State: 1
75. Dartmouth: 1
76. East Carolina: 1
77. Florida Atlantic: 1
78. Fresno State: 1
79. Iowa State: 1
80. Kansas: 1
81. Louisiana Tech: 1
82. Marshall: 1
83. Northern Illinois: 1
84. Northwestern: 1
85. Penn: 1
86. Princeton: 1
87. Rutgers: 1
88. Saint Mary's: 1
89. San Jose State: 1
90. Temple: 1
91. Tulane: 1
92. UTEP: 1
