= Sean Taylor =

American football player (1983–2007)

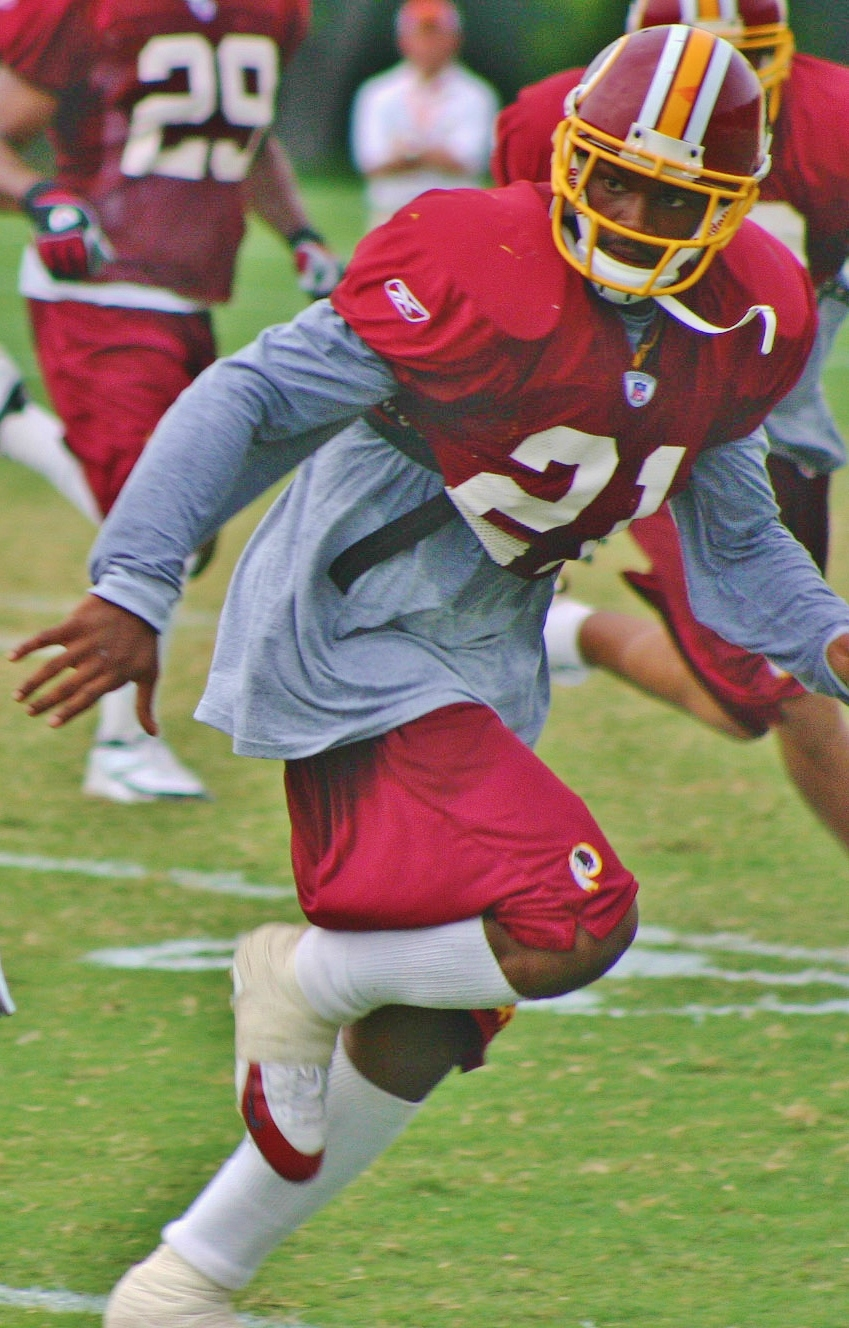
- Taylor with the Washington Redskins in 2005

No. 36, 21
- Position: Safety

Personal information
- Born: April 1, 1983; Florida City, Florida, U.S.
- Died: November 27, 2007 (aged 24); Miami, Florida, U.S.
- Listed height: 6 ft 2 in (1.88 m)
- Listed weight: 231 lb (105 kg)

Career information
- High school: Gulliver Prep (Pinecrest, Florida)
- College: Miami (FL) (2001–2003)
- NFL draft: 2004: 1st round, 5th overall pick

Career history
- Washington Redskins (2004–2007)

Awards and highlights
- Second-team All-Pro (2007); 2× Pro Bowl (2006, 2007); PFWA All-Rookie Team (2004); Washington Commanders 90 Greatest; Washington Commanders Ring of Fame; Washington Commanders No. 21 retired; BCS national champion (2001); Jack Tatum Trophy (2003); Unanimous All-American (2003); NCAA interceptions co-leader (2003); Big East Defensive Player of the Year (2003); First-team All-Big East (2003); Second-team All-Big East (2002)

Career NFL statistics
- Total tackles: 305
- Sacks: 2
- Forced fumbles: 8
- Pass deflections: 43
- Interceptions: 12
- Defensive touchdowns: 1
- Stats at Pro Football Reference

Sean Michael Maurice Taylor (April 1, 1983 – November 27, 2007) was an American professional football player who was a safety for the Washington Redskins of the National Football League (NFL). He was selected fifth overall in the 2004 NFL draft by the Redskins, where he played four seasons until his murder in 2007.

As a high school player, Taylor led Gulliver Prep to a Florida state championship and set the state record for single-season touchdowns. He played college football for the Miami Hurricanes, where he was a member of their 2001 BCS National Championship team and won the Jack Tatum Trophy. With the Redskins, he gained a reputation as a hard-hitting player and was nicknamed "Meast" from the expression "half man, half beast." He made one Pro Bowl appearance in 2006.

During the 2007 season, Taylor was shot by intruders at his Miami area home and died the next day on November 27. Posthumously, he earned a second Pro Bowl selection and second-team All-Pro honors. Taylor was inducted to Washington's Ring of Fame in 2008.

== Early life ==
Taylor was born in Florida City, Florida, on April 1, 1983. He spent his early years growing up with his great-grandmother in Homestead, Florida and later moved to his father's home at the age of 11. Taylor was baptized at the Bethel Seventh day Adventist Church in Florida City, Florida. He grew up in a low income neighborhood in Miami, on a street lined with candy colored houses.

Taylor played high school football in Pinecrest, a suburb of Miami. He began his high school football career at Miami Killian Senior High School, then a Class 5A public school, famously known for the school that garnered the talents like Frank Gore Jr., Lamar Miller. He then later transferred to Gulliver Preparatory School, where he was a three-sport star in football, track and field, and basketball due to Killian not allowing him to play both side of the ball. Despite missing the first game of the season, the team's only loss, he helped Gulliver win the Florida Class 2A State Championship in 2000 with a 14–1 record.

Taylor was a star on both sides of the ball during that season, playing running back, safety, and linebacker. He rushed for 1,400 yards, scored a state-record 44 touchdowns, and twice rushed for over 200 yards during Gulliver's state playoff run. He also compiled more than 100 tackles during the season and scored three touchdowns (two receiving, one rushing) in the state title game victory over Marianna High School. In track and field, Taylor won the state 2A 100-meter dash in 2000 and was also one of the state's top 400-meter dash sprinters.

Taylor was considered the top prospect in Miami-Dade County by the Miami Herald. He was also rated the nation's No. 1 skill athlete and an All-American by Super Prep. Taylor was also an Orlando Sentinel Super Southern Team selection, the No. 1 athlete on The Florida Times-Union Super 75 list and rated the No. 1 player in Florida by The Gainesville Sun.

In 2007, he was also named to the Florida High School Athletic Association's All-Century Team, which selected the Top 33 players in the 100-year history of high school football in the state. After his death, Taylor was honored at Gulliver by a plaque that was placed in the school's cafeteria. The football field at Gulliver Prep was renamed Sean Taylor Memorial Field on September 5, 2009.

== College career ==
Taylor was recruited to play for coach Larry Coker's Miami Hurricanes football team at the University of Miami. He was also a member of the Hurricanes track and field team, competing in events such as the 100-meter and 200-meters.

=== 2001 season ===
As one of only four true freshmen on the 2001 Miami Hurricanes football team, Taylor carved a niche for himself in Miami's secondary in nickel and dime defensive schemes. During the season, Taylor was named Big East Special Teams Player of the Week for his performance against the Pittsburgh Panthers. The Hurricanes won the national championship in 2001, and the 2001 Miami Hurricanes team has subsequently been ranked among the best in the history of college football.

=== 2002 season ===
In 2002, his first season as a starter, Taylor was a second-team All-Big East selection by the league's head coaches. He finished third on the team in tackles with 85 (53 solo), broke up 15 passes, intercepted 4 passes, forced one fumble, blocked one kick and returned a punt for a touchdown. He led all Miami defensive backs in tackles, interceptions and passes broken up, and had a career-high 11 tackles (2 solo) and intercepted 2 passes in the Hurricanes National Championship loss to Ohio State. He made a critical play during the game, in which he intercepted Buckeyes quarterback Craig Krenzel in the endzone and returned the ball out of the endzone. Buckeyes running back Maurice Clarett ran Taylor down and stripped the ball from him, some argue Sean Taylor's knee was down before the ball was stripped away from him, but the call on the field was a turnover. At that time there was no instant replay to review the call, but the call likely would not have been overturned. Clarett's recovery for Ohio State, allowed them to kick a field goal to go up 17–7 at the time.

=== 2003 season ===
Taylor produced a historic season during his final year at Miami that culminated with a plethora of honors and awards. He was named a unanimous first-team All-American, the Big East Conference Defensive Player of the Year and a finalist for the Jim Thorpe Award, given to the nation's best defensive back. He led the Big East Conference and ranked first nationally in interceptions with 10, tying the record for interceptions in a season with former Hurricanes standout Bennie Blades. Taylor also finished first in total tackles with 77 (57 solo). He intercepted two passes in Miami's impressive 28–14 win over Pittsburgh, playing a key role as the Hurricanes limited All-American receiver Larry Fitzgerald to just three receptions for 26 yards. He returned interceptions for an average of 18.4 yards, including a 67-yard touchdown return at Boston College, a 50-yard scoring runback at Florida State and a 44-yard scoring runback against Rutgers University. His three touchdown returns of interceptions is a Miami single-season record.

Taylor also competed in track and field as a senior for the Hurricanes. He placed 4th in the 100-meter at the Gatorade Invitational in Coral Gables, Florida, with a time of 10.77 seconds, behind teammates Terrell Walden, Roscoe Parrish and Travarous Bain. His best efforts for the season came at the Big East Outdoor T&F Championships in Storrs, Connecticut, where he ran personal-bests of 10.74 seconds in the 100-meter dash and 21.60 seconds in the 200-meter dash. He also participated as a member of the 4x100 relay.

== Professional career ==
=== Pre-draft ===
Following his 2003 season, Taylor announced that he was entering the NFL draft. He attended the NFL Scouting Combine in Indianapolis, Indiana, but opted to skip all of the combine drills and only met with team representatives and personnel.

Pre-draft measurables
Height	Weight	Arm length	Hand span	40-yard dash	Vertical jump	Broad jump	Bench press	Wonderlic
6 ft 2 1/2 in (1.89 m)	230 lb (104 kg)	32 3/8 in (0.82 m)	10 1/8 in (0.26 m)	4.51 s	35.0 in (0.89 m)	10 ft 1 in (3.07 m)	11 reps	10
All values from NFL Combine/Miami's Pro Day

=== 2004 ===
In the 2004 NFL draft, the Washington Redskins selected Taylor in the first round with the fifth overall selection. He was the first of a record six players selected in the first round from the University of Miami; the other five players were Kellen Winslow II, Jonathan Vilma, D. J. Williams, Vernon Carey, and Vince Wilfork.

On July 27, 2004, the Redskins signed Taylor to a six-year, $18.5 million contract that included a $13.4 million signing bonus and could have been worth $40 million with incentives and bonuses. His contract also included a seventh-year option. Taylor became the first top ten pick to sign his contract in 2004.

On August 4, 2004, dissatisfied with his contract, Taylor fired his agents, Eugene Mato and Jeff Moorad. He fired them after other top ten picks signed their contracts and felt their deals were better in comparison. This marked his second time firing agents within five months after he fired agent Drew Rosenhaus two days after the NFL draft. He immediately rehired Rosenhaus, who served as his agent for the remainder of his career. Taylor also had an incident that involved his early departure during the NFL's Rookie Symposium which was mandatory for every incoming player from the draft and was held over four days. He left after the first day, but returned for the last two days at the urging of representatives from the Redskins. Over his first three seasons, Taylor also was fined at least seven times for late hits, uniform violations and other infractions.

Throughout training camp, Taylor competed for the job as the starting free safety against Andre Lott. On August 9, 2004, Taylor made his professional NFL debut in the Redskins' preseason-opener as part of their second unit defense against the Denver Broncos. He recorded two interceptions in the second half off passes by rookie quarterback Matt Mauck. During the third quarter, Taylor intercepted a pass intended for Jeb Putzier and returned it for a three-yard touchdown to put Washington in the lead 10–9. Head coach Joe Gibbs named Taylor the backup free safety to begin the regular season, behind starter Andre Lott, after Taylor failed to surpass him on the depth chart.

He made his professional regular season debut in the Washington Redskins' season-opener against the Tampa Bay Buccaneers and assisted on one tackle in their 16–10 victory. In Week 3, Taylor earned his first career start after surpassing Lott on the depth chart and recorded four combined tackles and deflected two passes in the Redskins' 21–18 loss to the Dallas Cowboys. On October 18, 2004, Taylor made four solo tackles, a pass deflection, a sack, and returned his first career interception for 45-yards during a 13–10 win at the Chicago Bears. He made his first career interception and sack during the game, recording both on quarterback Brian Griese. In Week 12, he collected a season-high ten combined tackles (seven solo) and broke up a pass in a 16–7 loss at the Pittsburgh Steelers. He finished his rookie season in 2004 with 76 combined tackles (60 solo), nine pass deflections, four interceptions, two forced fumbles, and a sack in 15 games and 13 starts.

=== 2005 ===
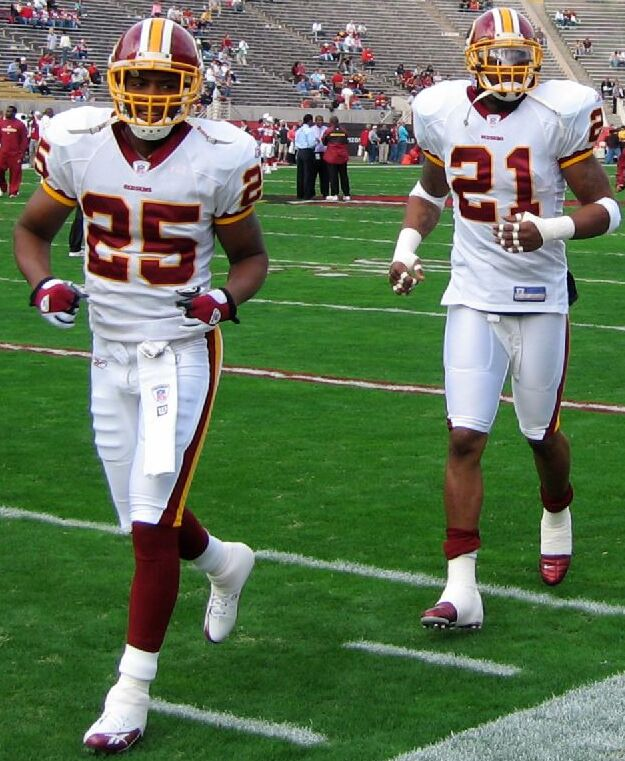
Ryan Clark (left) and Taylor (right), pictured here in December 2005, both joined Washington in 2004

Before the season started, Taylor switched his jersey number from No. 36 to No. 21 after it was available due to the departure of cornerback Fred Smoot to the Minnesota Vikings. Taylor kept the number when Smoot rejoined the Redskins in 2007, with Smoot opting to wear No. 27. Assistant head coach/defensive coordinator Gregg Williams opted to retain Taylor as the starting free safety to begin the regular season, alongside strong safety Ryan Clark.

He started the Washington Redskins' season-opener against the Chicago Bears and recorded four solo tackles and broke up a pass in their 9–7 victory. On November 11, 2005, it was reported that Taylor and teammate Clinton Portis received fines from the NFL due to violating the league's uniform code during the Redskins' 17–10 home victory against the Philadelphia Eagles in Week 9. Taylor's fine was for $5,000 due to his choice of wearing white socks with a burgundy and gold striped pattern instead of the required all white socks. He was inactive for the Redskins' Week 10 loss at the Tampa Bay Buccaneers due to an injury. On January 1, 2006, he collected a season-high nine combined tackles and deflected two passes during a 31–20 win at the Philadelphia Eagles. Taylor finished the 2005 season with 70 combined tackles (60 solo), a career-high ten pass deflections, two interceptions, two forced fumbles, and a sack in 15 games and 15 starts.

The Washington Redskins finished second in the NFC East with a 10–6 record and received a wildcard berth. On January 7, 2006, Taylor started in his first career playoff game and recorded seven combined tackles and returned a fumble for a touchdown in their 17–10 victory at the Tampa Bay Buccaneers. During this game he allegedly spit in the face of Buccaneers running back Michael Pittman and hit him in the face. Taylor was ejected.

Two days later, the NFL fined Taylor $17,000 for the incident. The Redskins were eliminated the following game after losing 20–10 to the Seattle Seahawks in the NFC Divisional Round. Taylor finished the loss with seven combined tackles and a pass deflection.

=== 2006 ===
Head coach Joe Gibbs named Taylor the starting free safety to start the regular season in 2006, along with starting strong safety Adam Archuleta (Archuleta was benched for the second half of the season in favor of Troy Vincent).

On October 15, 2006, Taylor collected a season-high ten combined tackles (eight solo) and deflected a pass during a 25–22 loss to the Tennessee Titans. In Week 9, Taylor made eight combined tackles and returned a blocked 35-yard field goal attempt by Mike Vanderjagt for a 30-yard gain with less than six seconds left in the game. A facemask on Taylor by Kyle Kosier added a 15-yard penalty and placed the Redskins in field goal range with an untimed down. Vanderjagt's game-winning field goal was blocked by Troy Vincent and allowed Redskins' kicker Nick Novak to kick a 47-yard game-winning field goal to defeat the Dallas Cowboys 22–19. On November 26, 2006, Taylor recorded five combined tackles, two pass deflections, and intercepted a pass by quarterback Jake Delhomme in the Redskins' 17–13 win against the Carolina Panthers. He made a key fourth down tackle on Delhomme in the fourth quarter and his interception sealed the Redskins' victory. He was voted as the NFC Defensive Player of the Week for his performance. He finished the 2006 season with a career-high 111 combined tackles (86 solo), six pass deflections, three forced fumbles, and an interception in 16 games and 16 starts. During the season, Washington Redskins assistant coach Gregg Williams frequently called Taylor the best athlete that he had ever coached.

External videos
- Sean Taylor's hit on Brian Moorman

Even while playing on a struggling Redskins defensive unit, Taylor's impact on the field was recognized when he was named a first alternate to the NFC's 2007 Pro Bowl team. When the NFC's first choice for safety, Brian Dawkins of the Philadelphia Eagles, chose not to play in the Pro Bowl due to an injury, Taylor was named to the vacated spot, marking his first and only Pro Bowl appearance. A crushing hit by Taylor on Buffalo Bills punter Brian Moorman in the Pro Bowl created much fan and media discussion.

=== 2007 ===
Prior to the start of the 2007 season, Sports Illustrated named Taylor the hardest-hitting player in the NFL.

Before the season, in a rare interview, he was quoted as saying, "[Y]ou play a kid's game for a king's ransom. And if you don't take it serious enough, eventually one day you're going to say, 'Oh, I could have done this, I could have done that.'" The season appeared to represent a personal turnaround for Taylor, as teammates said that he had finally gotten his life straightened out because of his daughter.

Prior to the season's start, the Redskins decided to use Taylor in a more traditional free safety role with less responsibility.

At the time of his death, Taylor was tied for the most interceptions in the National Football Conference and second in the league with 5 despite having missed Weeks 11 and 12 with a knee injury. Taylor had also compiled 42 tackles, 9 passes defended and a forced fumble.

On December 18, 2007, Taylor was posthumously voted to his second Pro Bowl, becoming the first deceased player in NFL history to be elected to the Pro Bowl. During the Pro Bowl, the Redskins players who had been selected, Chris Samuels, Chris Cooley and Ethan Albright, wore #21 to honor Taylor. Like the Redskins had done earlier in the season, the NFC lined up with just one safety on the first play of the game.

== Career statistics ==
Legend
**Bold**	Career high

=== NFL ===
Year	Team	Games		Tackling				Fumbles			Interceptions					
Year	Team	GP	GS	Cmb	Solo	Ast	Sck	FF	FR	Yds	Int	Yds	Avg	Lng	TD	PD
2004	WAS	15	15	76	60	16	**1.0**	2	0	0	4	85	21.2	45	0	9
2005	WAS	15	15	70	60	10	**1.0**	2	**1**	**1**	2	34	17.0	32	0	**10**
2006	WAS	16	16	**111**	**86**	**25**	0.0	**3**	0	0	1	25	**25.0**	25	0	6
2007	WAS	9	9	42	32	10	0.0	2	0	0	**5**	**98**	19.6	**48**	0	9
Career		55	55	299	238	61	2.0	9	1	1	12	242	20.7	48	0	34

=== College ===
Legend
Led the NCAA

Season	Team	GP	Defense				
Season	Team	GP	Cmb	TfL	PD	Int	FF
2001	Miami	10	26	0.0	0	0	0
2002	Miami	13	**85**	**4.0**	**15**	4	**1**
2003	Miami	12	77	0.0	0	**10**	0
Totals		35	188	4.0	15	14	1

== Legal issues ==
In October 2004, Taylor was arrested in Fairfax County, Virginia, on a charge of driving under the influence of alcohol following a birthday party for former Redskins receiver Rod Gardner in Washington, D.C. Taylor was pulled over for driving 82 mph on the Beltway, where the speed limit is 55 mph. Taylor subsequently failed a field sobriety test and then refused a blood alcohol (BAC) test, which resulted in his arrest.

In March 2005, a Fairfax County judge acquitted Taylor of the DWI charge after viewing a videotape of Taylor's roadside sobriety tests that, according to the judge, failed to demonstrate obvious intoxication. Taylor was, however, convicted for refusing to take a blood alcohol test requested by a Virginia state police officer. Taylor's conviction on refusing to take the blood alcohol test was heard on appeal later that month, in March 2005, and Taylor was also acquitted of that charge, with the judge ruling there was a lack of probable cause for the request.

In June 2005, Taylor was sought by police following an incident in which bullets were fired into a stolen vehicle.

In April 2006 trial, Taylor pled no contest to misdemeanor battery and assault charges, and was placed on 18 months probation and ordered to support ten Miami-Dade County schools by speaking about the importance of education and donating $1,000 to each school.

== Death ==
On the night of November 26, 2007, while at home, Taylor heard noises in his house and, while investigating the cause, was shot in the leg by a home intruder. Taylor's fiancée, Jackie García, and their 18-month-old daughter, Jackie, were unharmed in the incident. Taylor's femoral artery was severed, causing extensive blood loss.

Taylor was rushed to Jackson Memorial Hospital, where he died the following day, on November 27, 2007, at age 24.

Taylor's funeral was held at the Pharmed Arena at Florida International University in Miami on December 3, 2007.

On November 30, three men and one boy, Venjah K. Hunte, 20; Eric Rivera Jr., 17; Jason Scott Mitchell, 19; and Charles Kendrick Lee Wardlow, 18, were arrested. Police said more than one confessed. All four men were charged with felony second-degree murder, armed burglary, and home invasion robbery with a firearm, charges that carried a maximum of life in prison. In May 2008, a fifth suspect, 16-year-old Timothy Brown, was charged with first-degree murder and burglary. All the murder charges were subsequently increased to first-degree murder. The death penalty, however, was not sought because the gunman, Rivera, was 17 years old.

Jason Mitchell was the alleged mastermind of the burglary plan. Mitchell was found guilty of first degree murder and armed burglary, and given a life sentence. Venjah K. Hunte was sentenced to 29 years in prison. Eric Rivera Jr. was convicted of second-degree murder, manslaughter, burglary with a battery and trespassing, and he was sentenced to 57 years in prison. Charles Wardlow was sentenced to 30 years in prison.

=== Remembrance ===
The NFL recognized the death of Taylor by placing a No. 21 decal on the back of all NFL players' helmets during all Week 13 games; additionally, a moment of silence was held before each game that week. Players on other teams were given the option to continue wearing the decals in subsequent weeks.

Taylor was posthumously voted starting free safety for the NFC team for the 2008 Pro Bowl and voted a second team All-Pro.

The Redskins had the number 21 painted on the field, at a parking lot entrance and in the Redskins Ring of Fame, all three of which became temporary memorials. In addition to the black No. 21 sticker on the back of every NFL helmet, the Redskins also wore the number as a patch on player uniforms, warmup shirts and coaching staff jackets, as well as unveiling a banner bearing his name and number. His locker at Redskins Park was encased in Plexiglas and left the same way Taylor had left it. The organization also established a trust fund for Taylor's daughter, Jackie.

The first Redskins game after Taylor's death was on December 2, 2007, which was against the Buffalo Bills and held at FedExField. The game began with the Redskins defense playing with 10 men on the field instead of the usual 11. Players signaled to the sky, holding up the numbers two and one, on numerous occasions. The team requested that fans arrive 25 minutes before the start of the game at 12:40pm and played a four-minute remembrance video, held a moment of silence and gave attendees commemorative towels with Taylor's number on them in his honor and memory.

Teammates Chris Cooley, Chris Samuels and Ethan Albright all wore jerseys with No. 21 during the 2008 Pro Bowl. The three jerseys were auctioned off and the proceeds donated to the Sean Taylor Memorial Trust Fund.

The murder was covered on the Investigation Discovery show The Perfect Murder.

His jersey number was retired by the team in October 2021; he was the third player in the team's history to have that honor. The ceremony also included naming of a road to the stadium in his honor.

=== Trial ===
On May 12, 2008, it was announced the suspects, if convicted, would not face the death penalty, but may be subjected to life imprisonment because the suspected gunman, Eric Rivera, was only 17 at the time of the shooting. On May 15, 2008, Venjah Hunte, one of the five suspects in Taylor's murder, accepted a plea deal and was sentenced to 29 years in prison. On April 1, 2009, Hunte petitioned the court to withdraw his guilty plea.

Although originally scheduled for April 7, 2008, the trial of the men charged with Sean Taylor's murder was postponed to June 2009. It was postponed by petition of the defense, saying that there were still hundreds of potential witnesses who needed to be interviewed before the trial could proceed. The trial was then delayed for a third time on June 9, 2009, for unspecified reasons. A new trial date was set for January 18, 2010, and was postponed again with a trial date of March 14, 2011. After another delay, the trial was set to begin on January 30, 2012.

On January 20, 2012, a judge set a trial date of April 16 for Eric Rivera Jr., the alleged gunman in the case. However, Rivera fired his lawyer on March 16, eventually causing delays. On July 12, the judge postponed the trial to November 5, but that date was further moved back to April 5, 2013, due to a scheduling conflict with the chief prosecutor. On April 2, 2013, the trial was again postponed to August 12 of that year. Also in August, the trial was postponed to September 16 and later rescheduled to October 15. During his trial, Rivera testified that someone else fired the gun. On November 4, a jury found Eric Rivera Jr. guilty of second-degree murder and armed burglary, which could carry a life imprisonment sentence.

On January 23, 2014, Miami-Dade Circuit Judge Dennis Murphy sentenced Rivera to 57 1/2 years in prison. On June 10, Jason Scott Mitchell was convicted in Taylor's murder and sentenced to life imprisonment.

On April 1, 2015, Charles Wardlow, the fourth person charged Taylor's death, was sentenced to 30 years in prison. A week later, the final defendant, Timmy Lee Brown, was sentenced to 18 years in prison under a plea agreement.

== Legacy ==
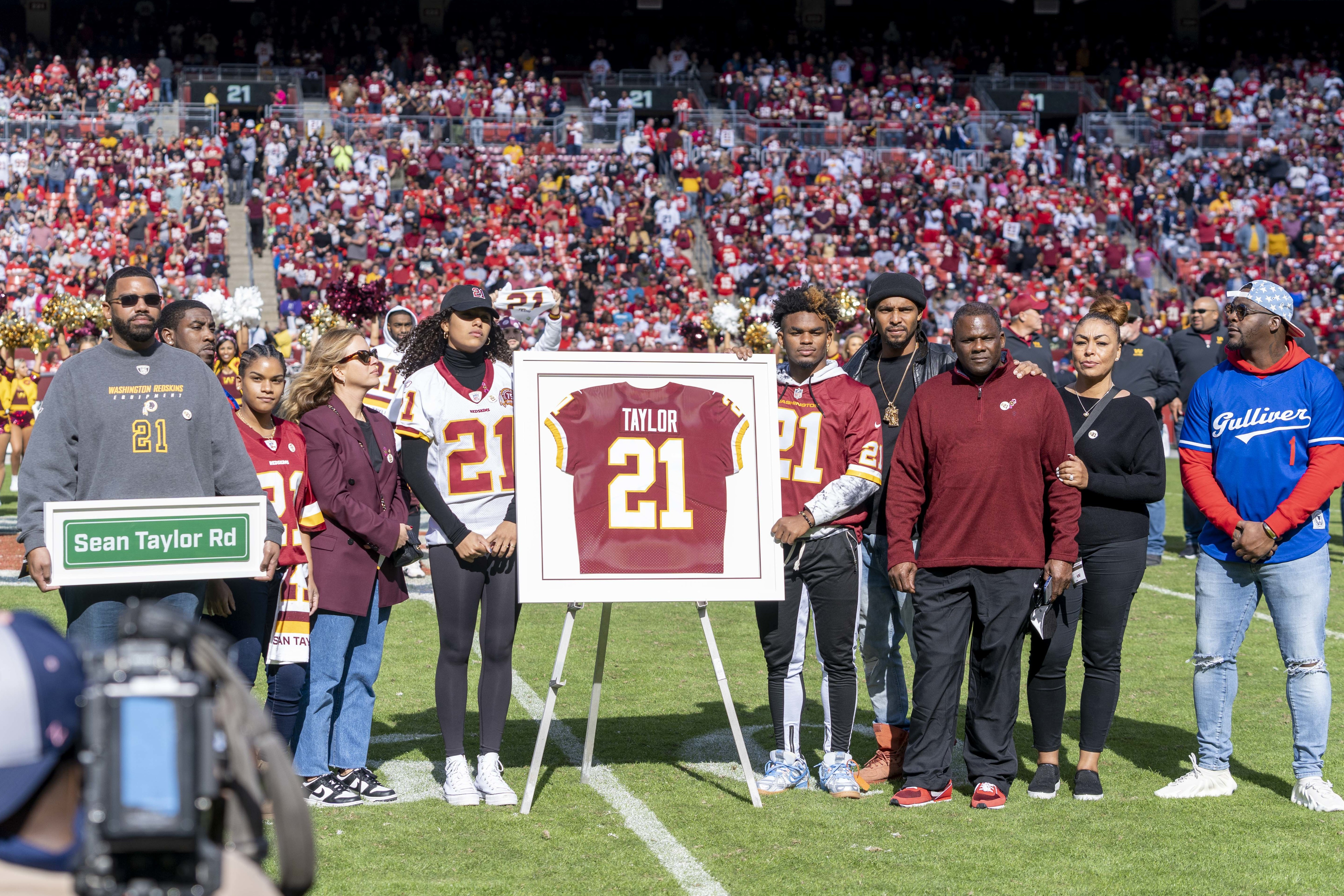
Taylor's family attending his a Washington Redskins ceremony commemorating the retirement of Taylor's jersey number (#21) at FedExField in October 2021

Taylor was inducted posthumously as the 43rd member into the Washington Redskins Ring of Fame on November 30, 2008.

Multiple players have honored Taylor by donning his jersey numbers that he wore during his college and professional career. During his college career Taylor wore No. 26 for the Miami Hurricanes. As a rookie in 2004, he wore No. 36 before switching to No. 21 for the remainder of his career. Taylor's former teammate and fellow safety Ryan Clark returned to the Washington Redskins in 2014 after an eight-year stint with the Pittsburgh Steelers. During practices, Clark wore No. 21 in Taylor's honor. The Washington Redskins' second round pick in the 2016 NFL draft, Su'a Cravens, chose No. 36 upon joining the Redskins as a rookie in dedication to Taylor. Cravens switched to No. 39 in 2017 after safety D. J. Swearinger requested No. 36 after signing with the Redskins as a free agent. Swearinger wore No. 36 throughout four teams in his professional career as a way to honor Taylor. Heading into the 2015 season, the New York Giants announced safety Landon Collins would switch from No. 27 to No. 21 to honor Taylor. Collins also wore Taylor's college number (No. 26) during his collegiate career at Alabama as a way to pay tribute.

In September 2020, one of the roads leading to FedExField was renamed Sean Taylor Road in Taylor's memory. On October 17, 2021, the Washington franchise retired Sean Taylor's number 21 before a game against the Kansas City Chiefs with his family in attendance.

On November 27, 2022, the Washington Commanders unveiled a statue-like display honoring Taylor at FedExField. The unveiling was followed by criticism of the design and lack of a physical statue.

== See also ==
- List of gridiron football players who died during their careers

Sean Taylor's brother, Gabriel Taylor, now wears the number 21 in honour of Sean. Gabriel Taylor plays for the UFL’s DC Defenders.
