= 2003 All-America college football team =

Official list of the best college football players of 2003

The 2003 All-America college football team is composed of the following All-American Teams: Associated Press, Football Writers Association of America, American Football Coaches Association, Walter Camp Foundation, The Sporting News, Pro Football Weekly, Sports Illustrated, ESPN, and Rivals.com

The All-America college football team is an honor given annually to the best American college football players at their respective positions. The original usage of the term All-America was with such a list selected by Caspar Whitney in 1889. The NCAA officially recognizes All-Americans selected by the AP, AFCA, FWAA, TSN, and the WCFF to determine consensus All-Americans.

Eighteen players were recognized as consensus All-Americans for 2003, 12 of them unanimously. Unanimous selections are followed by an asterisk (*)

2003 Consensus All-Americans
Name	Position	Year	University
Jason White*	Quarterback	Senior	Oklahoma
Kevin Jones	Running back	Junior	Virginia Tech
Chris Perry	Running back	Senior	Michigan
Larry Fitzgerald*	Wide receiver	Sophomore	Pittsburgh
Mike Williams	Wide receiver	Sophomore	USC
Kellen Winslow II*	Tight end	Junior	Miami (FL)
Jake Grove*	Center	Senior	Virginia Tech
Shawn Andrews*	Offensive line	Junior	Arkansas
Robert Gallery*	Offensive line	Senior	Iowa
Jacob Rogers	Offensive line	Senior	USC
Alex Barron	Offensive line	Junior	Florida State
Dave Ball*	Defensive line	Senior	UCLA
Tommie Harris*	Defensive line	Junior	Oklahoma
Chad Lavalais	Defensive line	Senior	LSU
Kenechi Udeze	Defensive line	Junior	USC
Teddy Lehman*	Linebacker	Senior	Oklahoma
Derrick Johnson	Linebacker	Junior	Texas
Grant Wiley	Linebacker	Senior	West Virginia
Derrick Strait*	Defensive back	Senior	Oklahoma
Sean Taylor*	Defensive back	Junior	Miami (FL)
Keiwan Ratliff	Defensive back	Senior	Florida
Will Allen	Defensive back	Senior	LSU
Nate Kaeding	Placekicker	Senior	Iowa
Nick Browne	Placekicker	Senior	TCU
Dustin Colquitt	Punter	Junior	Tennessee
Antonio Perkins*	Return specialist	Junior	Oklahoma

== Offense ==
=== Quarterback ===
- Jason White, Oklahoma (AP-1, AFCA-Coaches, Walter Camp, FWAA-Writers, TSN, PFW, SI, ESPN, Rivals)
- Eli Manning, Ole Miss (AP-2, Walter Camp-2)
- Ben Roethlisberger, Miami (OH) (AP-3)

=== Running back ===
- Kevin Jones, Virginia Tech (AP-2, AFCA-Coaches, Walter Camp, FWAA-Writers, TSN, ESPN)
- Chris Perry, Michigan (AP-1, AFCA-Coaches, Walter Camp, TSN, PFW, SI, ESPN, Rivals)
- Darren Sproles, Kansas State (AP-1, SI, Rivals, Walter Camp-2)
- Steven Jackson, Oregon State (AP-3, PFW)
- Michael Turner, Northern Illinois (AP-2, Walter Camp-2)
- Quincy Wilson, West Virginia (AP-3)

=== Wide receiver ===
- Larry Fitzgerald, Pittsburgh (AP-1, AFCA-Coaches, Walter Camp, FWAA-Writers, TSN, PFW, SI, ESPN, Rivals)
- Mike Williams, Southern California (AP-1, FWAA-Writers, Walter Camp, SI, ESPN, Rivals)
- Rashaun Woods, Oklahoma State (AP-2, AFCA-Coaches)
- Mark Clayton, Oklahoma (AP-2, TSN, PFW, Walter Camp-2)
- Roy Williams, Texas, (AP-3, Walter Camp-2)

=== Tight end ===
- Kellen Winslow Jr., Miami,(Fla.) (AP-1, AFCA-Coaches, Walter Camp, FWAA-Writers, TSN, PFW )
- Ben Troupe, Florida (AP-2, SI, ESPN, Rivals, Walter Camp-2)
- Kris Wilson, Pittsburgh (AP-3)

=== Tackle ===
- Shawn Andrews, Arkansas (AP-1, AFCA-Coaches, Walter Camp, FWAA-Writers, TSN, PFW, SI, ESPN, Rivals)
- Robert Gallery, Iowa (AP-1, AFCA-Coaches, Walter Camp, FWAA-Writers, TSN, PFW, SI, ESPN, Rivals)
- Jacob Rogers, Southern California (AP-1, AFCA-Coaches, Walter Camp, FWAA-Writers, SI)
- Alex Barron, Florida State (AP-1, Walter Camp, FWAA-Writers, Rivals)
- Jammal Brown, Oklahoma (AP-2, AFCA-Coaches, SI, Walter Camp-2)
- Vernon Carey, Miami (AP-3, Walter Camp-2)
- Tony Pape, Michigan (AP-2, Walter Camp-2)

=== Guard ===
- Stephen Peterman, LSU (AP-2, TSN, SI, ESPN, Rivals, Walter Camp-2)
- Shannon Snell, Florida (TSN)
- Justin Smiley, Alabama (PFW)
- Lamar Bryant, Maryland (PFW)
- Alex Stepanovich, Ohio State (AP-3, ESPN)
- David Baas, Michigan (AP-2)
- Tillman Holloway, Texas (AP-3)
- Claude Terrell, New Mexico (AP-3)

=== Center ===
- Jake Grove, Virginia Tech (AP-1, AFCA-Coaches, Walter Camp, FWAA-Writers, TSN, Rivals)
- Nick Leckey, Kansas State (ESPN, Walter Camp-2)
- Ben Wilkerson, LSU (AP-2)
- Greg Eslinger, Minnesota (AP-3)

== Defense ==
=== Ends ===
- Dave Ball, UCLA (AFCA-Coaches, Walter Camp, FWAA-Writers, AP-1, TSN, SI, ESPN, Rivals)
- Kenechi Udeze, Southern California (FWAA-Writers, AP-1, TSN, PFW, SI, ESPN, Rivals, Walter Camp-2)
- Will Smith, Ohio State (AP-2, AFCA-Coaches, Walter Camp, PFW, SI, Rivals)
- David Pollack, Georgia (AP-2, AFCA-Coaches, Walter Camp-2)
- Jason Babin, Western Michigan (Walter Camp-2)
- Darnell Dockett, Florida State (AP-3, Walter Camp-2)
- Shaun Phillips, Purdue (AP-2)
- Bo Schobel, TCU (AP-2)

=== Tackle ===
- Tommie Harris, Oklahoma (AP-1, AFCA-Coaches, FWAA-Writers, TSN, Walter Camp, ESPN)
- Chad Lavalais, LSU (AP-1, FWAA-Writers, TSN, Walter Camp, SI, ESPN, Rivals)
- Marcus Tubbs, Texas (PFW)
- Tim Anderson, Ohio State (PFW)
- Dan Cody, Oklahoma (AP-3)
- Shaun Cody, USC (AP-3)
- Dusty Dvoracek, Oklahoma (AP-3)

=== Linebacker ===
- Teddy Lehman, Oklahoma (AP-1, AFCA-Coaches, Walter Camp, FWAA-Writers, TSN, PFW, SI, ESPN)
- Derrick Johnson, Texas (AP-1, Walter Camp, FWAA-Writers, SI, ESPN, Rivals)
- Grant Wiley, West Virginia (AP-1, FWAA-Writers, TSN, SI, Rivals, Walter Camp-2)
- Jonathan Vilma, Miami (Fla.) (AP-2, AFCA-Coaches, Walter Camp, PFW, Rivals)
- Karlos Dansby, Auburn (AP-2, AFCA-Coaches, ESPN, Walter Camp-2)
- Josh Buhl, Kansas State (AP-2, TSN)
- Keyaron Fox, Georgia Tech (PFW)
- Rod Davis (AP-3, Walter Camp-2)
- Michael Boulware, Florida State (AP-3)
- D. J. Williams, Miami (AP-3)

=== Cornerback ===
- Derrick Strait, Oklahoma (AP-1, AFCA-Coaches, Walter Camp, FWAA-Writers, TSN, SI, ESPN, Rivals)
- Keiwan Ratliff, Florida (AP-1, Walter Camp, FWAA-Writers, TSN, PFW, SI, ESPN, Rivals)
- Will Allen, Ohio State (AP-1, Walter Camp, FWAA-Writers)
- Corey Webster, LSU (AP-2, AFCA-Coaches, Walter Camp-2)
- Nathan Vasher, Texas (AP-3, PFW, Walter Camp-2)
- Antrel Rolle, Miami (AP-3)

=== Safety ===
- Sean Taylor, Miami (Fla.) (AP-1, AFCA-Coaches, Walter Camp, FWAA-Writers, TSN, SI, ESPN, Rivals)
- Sean Jones, Georgia (AP-3, AFCA-Coaches)
- Josh Bullocks, Nebraska (AP-2, TSN, SI, Rivals, Walter Camp-2)
- Jim Leonhard, Wisconsin (ESPN)
- Stuart Schweigert, Purdue (AP-3, Walter Camp-2)
- Will Poole, USC (AP-2)
- Bob Sanders, Iowa (AP-2)

== Special teams ==
=== Kicker ===
- Nate Kaeding, Iowa (AP-1, AFCA-Coaches, PFW, SI, ESPN, Walter Camp-2)
- Nick Browne, TCU (AP-2, Walter Camp, FWAA-Writers)
- Drew Dunning, Washington State (TSN, Rivals)
- Jonathan Nichols, Mississippi (AP-3)

=== Punter ===
- Dustin Colquitt, Tennessee (AP-1, Walter Camp, FWAA-Writers, TSN, Rivals)
- Kyle Larson, Nebraska (AFCA-Coaches)
- Tom Malone, Southern California (AP-2, SI, ESPN)
- Andy Lee, Pittsburgh (PFW)
- Matt Prater, UCF (Walter Camp-2)
- B. J. Sander, Ohio State (AP-3)

=== All-purpose player / return specialist ===
- Antonio Perkins, Oklahoma (AP-1, AFCA-Coaches, FWAA-Writers, TSN, Walter Camp, SI, Rivals)
- Derek Abney, Kentucky (AP_2, Walter Camp-2)
- Skyler Green, LSU (AP-3, SI, ESPN)

== See also ==
- 2003 All-Atlantic Coast Conference football team
- 2003 All-Big 12 Conference football team
- 2003 All-Big Ten Conference football team
- 2003 All-Pacific-10 Conference football team
- 2003 All-SEC football team
