= Grant Wiley =

American football player

Grant Jameson Wiley
No. 91
- Position: Linebacker

Personal information
- Born: Trappe, Pennsylvania, U.S.
- Listed height: 6 ft 1 in (1.85 m)
- Listed weight: 185 lb (84 kg)

Career information
- High school: Perkiomen Valley (Collegeville, Pennsylvania)
- College: West Virginia
- NFL draft: 2004: undrafted

Career history
- Minnesota Vikings (2004)

Awards and highlights
- Consensus All-American (2003); Big East Rookie of the Year (2000); First-team All-Big East (2002, 2003)

Grant Wiley is an American former college and professional football player. He played college football for West Virginia University, and earned All-American honors at linebacker. He played professionally for the Minnesota Vikings of the National Football League (NFL), but never appeared in a regular season NFL game. He became a creator in art and entertainment after suffering a career-ending shoulder injury.

== Early life ==
Wiley was born in Trappe, Pennsylvania. He attended Perkiomen Valley High School in Graterford, Pennsylvania, and played high school football for the Perkiomen Valley Vikings. He was recognized as the Offensive Player of the Year by the Norristown Times-Herald his senior year following his junior campaign as the Defensive Player of the Year. He was named Pac-10 MVP, PCTV Offensive Player of the Year and the Pottstown Mercury Player of the Year. He was also named to The Philadelphia Inquirer All-Area team. He was selected to play in the Ohio-Pennsylvania Big 33 game. He was rated the eighth-best Linebacker prospect in the East by PrepStar. He won Conference Defensive Player of the Year honors as a junior. He was named to the Pennsylvania Sports Fever Fab 85. He was also named to the Pennsylvania Football News All-State team.

== College career ==
Wiley attended West Virginia University, and played for the West Virginia Mountaineers football team from 2000 to 2003. As a freshman in 2000, he earned Big East Rookie of the Year honors after recording 94 tackles and 14 tackles for losses, he recorded three interceptions, one reception for 26 yards against East Carolina and two against Idaho which he returned one for a touchdown. He was voted second-team Freshman All-American and finished the season 12th in the conference in tackles and seventh in tackles-for-losses. His best performance of the season came against Idaho, when he recorded seven tackles, 2.5 sacks, and two interceptions. His first interceptions came in the third quarter, down 9-0, when he intercepted a pass and returned it for a touchdown. The interception helped the Mountaineers record a come-from-behind victory.

In 2001, Wiley's sophomore season was a relatively quiet season for him due to a nagging hamstring pull in the Mountaineers opener versus Boston College. One of his best performances came in a 35-0 loss to Virginia Tech, where he had a key interception. He was awarded the Ideal Mountaineer Man Award by the West Virginia coaches at the end of the season.

As a junior in 2002, Wiley earned national recognition. One of his best games was against Temple, where the Mountaineers won 46-20. He recorded an interception in the game that he returned deep into Temple territory, and a forced fumble by quarterback Mike Frost. Wiley recorded 133 tackles and two interceptions for the season.

Wiley's senior season, 2003, started as an average season for the Mountaineers. After starting the season 1-4, the Mountaineers won 7 straight games in the Big East to claim a share of the conference championship. West Virginia played Rutgers in a must-win situation, Wiley helped the Mountaineers win 34-19, by recording 11 tackles and a diving interception. Also, in the 52-31 victory over Pitt, he recorded a key interception in the endzone. Wiley also recorded 18 tackles in the game against the Miami Hurricanes. A team captain, Wiley earned consensus All-American honors for the season, making him one of only a handful of Mountaineers to do so. He was also a finalist for the 2003 Bronko Nagurski Award, which was won by Oklahoma's Derrick Strait. Wiley led the nation that season with 13 forced fumbles and ranked third with 7.6 tackles per game. He finished the year with 167 tackles, 14 tackles for a loss, two interceptions, and 13 forced fumbles.

=== Career statistics ===
	Career Defensive Statistics														
Year	Team	G	Tack	Solo	Ast	TFL	Sack	FF	FR	Int	Yds	Lng	TD	Pass Def.	Block
2000	West Virginia Mountaineers	12	94	57	37	14.0	3.0	0	0	3	38	22	2	2	0
2001	West Virginia Mountaineers	9	99	51	47	6.0	2.0	0	0	1	15	15	0	3	0
2002	West Virginia Mountaineers	13	133	91	42	13.5	3.0	2	1	2	17	17	0	9	0
2003	West Virginia Mountaineers	13	168	99	68	14.0	1.0	13	1	2	4	4	0	4	0
Total		47	494	299	195	47.5	9.0	15	2	8	74	22	2	18	0

== Professional career ==
Wiley was rated as the 13th best out of 51 Inside Linebackers and was projected to be selected in the sixth or seventh round. However, he went undrafted in the 2004 NFL draft and later signed a free agent contract with the Minnesota Vikings, on April 27. On August 6, he was placed on the waived-injured list by the Vikings. He was later placed on injured reserve.

In 2005, Wiley returned to Vikings training camp once again. This training camp was to be his last, as he seriously injured his shoulder in early August. After injuring his shoulder he was listed as day-to-day. However, turned out the injury was worse than expected. Thus, on August 9, he was waived, after agreeing on an injury settlement. That injury, being his second to require surgery, turned out to be career ending.

== Life after football ==
After a 60 pound life transformation, Wiley spent time living in New York City and around the world. Grant is co-founder and Chief of Culture for tech start-up, VEEPIO. He is working as a creator in the world of art and entertainment. Wiley trained in theater at the William Esper Acting School with master teacher, William Esper. He is currently working on writing and producing music, film, and television projects. His visual art has been showcased in various art shows in NYC and New York State. His film credits as a background and guest actor includes, Inside Amy Schumer, Trainwreck, Sex and the City: The Movie, Limitless, The Adjustment Bureau, The Wire, Lipstick Jungle, 40, Kings, Damages, and All My Children. Grant's credits as a Producer include Turtleface, Hunter Mountain Film Festival (2019), Fantastic Interviews, and Landmark Live: Brad Paisley Concert.
