= Jake Grove =

American football player (born 1980)

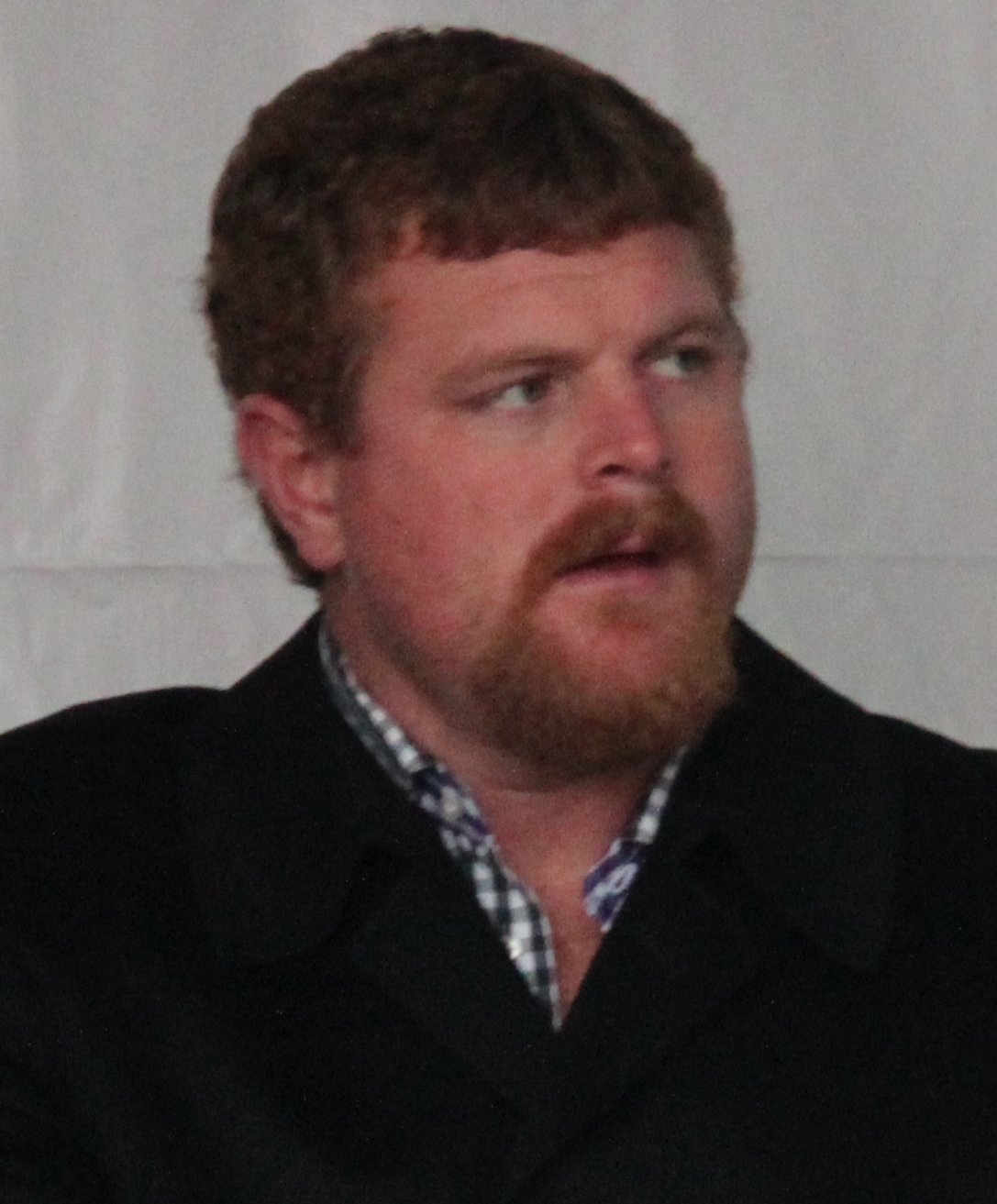
- Grove in 2014

No. 64
- Position: Center

Personal information
- Born: January 22, 1980 (age 46); Johnson City, Tennessee, U.S.
- Listed height: 6 ft 4 in (1.93 m)
- Listed weight: 300 lb (136 kg)

Career information
- High school: Jefferson Forest (Forest, Virginia)
- College: Virginia Tech (2000–2003)
- NFL draft: 2004: 2nd round, 45th overall pick

Career history
- Oakland Raiders (2004–2008); Miami Dolphins (2009)

Awards and highlights
- Rimington Trophy (2003); Unanimous All-American (2003); First-team All-Big East (2003); Virginia Tech Hokies Jersey No. 64 retired

Career NFL statistics
- Games played: 66
- Games started: 56
- Fumble recoveries: 2
- Stats at Pro Football Reference

Charles Jacob Grove (born January 22, 1980) is an American former professional football player who was a center in the National Football League (NFL) for seven seasons. He played college football for the Virginia Tech Hokies, winning the Rimington Trophy and earning unanimous All-American honors in 2003. He was selected by the Oakland Raiders in the second round of the 2004 NFL draft, and also played for the Miami Dolphins.

== Early life ==
Grove was born in Johnson City, Tennessee. He played high school football at Jefferson Forest High School in Forest, Virginia.

== College career ==
While attending Virginia Tech, Grove played for coach Frank Beamer's Hokies teams from 2000 to 2003. As a senior in 2003, he was a first-team All-Big East selection, received unanimous first-team All-American honors, and won the Rimington Trophy, given to the nation's best college center. In recognition of his outstanding college career as a Hokie, Virginia Tech retired his jersey number in 2006, and enshrined him in the Virginia Tech Sports Hall of Fame.

== Professional career ==
=== Oakland Raiders ===
Grove was selected in the second round (45th overall) of the 2004 NFL draft by the Oakland Raiders, through a pick that was acquired from the Tampa Bay Buccaneers in exchange for Jon Gruden, where he played from 2004 to 2008. After being the reserve center behind Adam Treu as a rookie, Grove split time with him as the starting center during the 2005 NFL season, in which the Raiders had a 4-12 won-lost record, then won the job the following year, the 7th starting center in Raider history, starting all 16 games, when Treu became his replacement for a 2–14 team. But in the 2007 NFL season, Jeremy Newberry became the starting center, as Grove started only two games for the 4–12 team. He got his job back in the 2008 NFL season, starting in 12 games, though the team's fortune stayed poor with a 5–11 record. His Oakland tenure was hampered by injuries, and he only played in more than 10 games twice during his six seasons in Oakland.

=== Miami Dolphins ===
On March 2, 2009, Grove signed a five-year, $29 million ($14.5 million guaranteed) free agent contract with the Miami Dolphins. The previous starting center for the Dolphins, Samson Satele, was traded to Grove's old team, the Raiders. Grove suffered through another injury plagued year, playing in 12 games, starting 10 of them. In the 2010 preseason, he suffered from nagging knee and shoulder injuries, and was cut by the Dolphins less than a year after signing his lucrative free agent contract in favor of Joe Berger. He reportedly worked out for the Raiders, Baltimore Ravens, Detroit Lions, and New England Patriots, but did not sign with another team.
