= Russell Maryland =

American football player (born 1969)

No. 67, 97
- Position: Defensive tackle

Personal information
- Born: March 22, 1969 (age 57); Chicago, Illinois, U.S.
- Listed height: 6 ft 1 in (1.85 m)
- Listed weight: 308 lb (140 kg)

Career information
- High school: Whitney M. Young Magnet (Chicago)
- College: Miami (FL) (1986–1990)
- NFL draft: 1991: 1st round, 1st overall pick

Career history
- Dallas Cowboys (1991–1995); Oakland Raiders (1996–1999); Green Bay Packers (2000)

Awards and highlights
- 3× Super Bowl champion (XXVII, XXVIII, XXX); Pro Bowl (1993); PFWA All-Rookie Team (1991); 2× National champion (1987, 1989); Outland Trophy (1990); UPI Lineman of the Year (1990); Unanimous All-American (1990); Third-team All-American (1989); Second-team All-South Independent (1988)

Career NFL statistics
- Sacks: 24.5
- Tackles: 466
- Forced fumbles: 9
- Interceptions: 1
- Touchdowns: 1
- Stats at Pro Football Reference
- College Football Hall of Fame

Russell James Maryland (born March 22, 1969) is an American former professional football player who was a defensive tackle for 10 seasons with the Dallas Cowboys, Oakland Raiders, and Green Bay Packers of the National Football League (NFL). He played college football for the Miami Hurricanes. Maryland was selected by the Cowboys with the first overall pick in the 1991 NFL draft.

== Early life ==
Maryland was born and raised in Chicago, Illinois, where he played high school football at Whitney M. Young Magnet High School. He was not highly recruited, and the only major college program to offer him a scholarship was the University of Miami.

In 1989, he was named third team All-American. As a senior in 1990, he registered 96 tackles and 10 1/2 quarterback sacks for the Miami Hurricanes. He was named a consensus All-American, College Football Lineman of the Year by the UPI and became the first Hurricane player ever to receive the Outland Trophy for the best lineman in college.

Maryland finished his college career with 279 tackles, 25 tackles for losses and 20.5 quarterback sacks, while helping his team win two national championships, four bowl games, a perfect home record and a 44–4 overall record.

Prior to his graduation from Miami, Russell was inducted into the Iron Arrow Honor Society, the highest honor bestowed by the university.

In 2001, he was inducted into the University of Miami Sports Hall of Fame. The same year, he was inducted into the Cotton Bowl Hall of Fame and the College Football Hall of Fame. In 2016, he received the NCAA Silver Anniversary Award.

== Professional career ==
Pre-draft measurables
Height	Weight	Arm length	Hand span	40-yard dash	10-yard split	20-yard split	Bench press
6 ft 0 7/8 in (1.85 m)	274 lb (124 kg)	31 1/2 in (0.80 m)	9 3/8 in (0.24 m)	4.96 s	1.77 s	2.94 s	26 reps
All values from NFL Combine

=== Dallas Cowboys ===
Maryland was the first overall pick in the 1991 NFL draft, by the Dallas Cowboys, after the initial No. 1 prospect Raghib Ismail decided to sign with the Toronto Argonauts. After the New England Patriots failed to sign Ismail, the Cowboys attempted to do so by trading for the first overall pick, sending the Patriots Eugene Lockhart, Ron Francis, David Howard, a 1991 first round pick (#11 Pat Harlow) and a 1991 second round pick (#41 Jerome Henderson).

Maryland started as a rookie defensive tackle and from the beginning showed the relentless motor and effort that he would be known for. He was especially stout against the run and helped the team win three Super Bowls. In 1993 he was named to his only Pro Bowl.

=== Oakland Raiders ===
On July 19, 1996, he signed as a free agent with the Oakland Raiders. On April 1, 2000, he was released in a salary cap move. He started 63 out of 64 games with the Raiders.

=== Green Bay Packers ===
On April 20, 2000, he was signed as a free agent by the Green Bay Packers, to replace Gilbert Brown as the team's starting nose tackle. He started all 16 games during the season. On September 2, 2001, he was released after refusing to take a pay cut.

During his 10-year career he started 140 of 154 games, had 371 tackles and 24.5 sacks, and recovered six fumbles.

== NFL career statistics ==
Legend
	Won the Super Bowl
**Bold**	Career high

Year	Team	Games		Tackles				Interceptions				Fumbles			
Year	Team	GP	GS	Comb	Solo	Ast	Sck	Int	Yds	TD	Lng	FF	FR	Yds	TD
1991	DAL	**16**	7	33	33	0	**4.5**	0	0	0	0	**3**	0	0	0
1992	DAL	14	13	49	49	0	2.5	0	0	0	0	1	**2**	**26**	**1**
1993	DAL	**16**	12	56	**56**	0	2.5	0	0	0	0	2	**2**	0	0
1994	DAL	**16**	**16**	30	28	2	3.0	0	0	0	0	0	1	0	0
1995	DAL	13	13	31	25	6	2.0	0	0	0	0	1	0	0	0
1996	OAK	**16**	**16**	52	41	11	2.0	0	0	0	0	0	0	0	0
1997	OAK	**16**	**16**	**79**	**56**	**23**	**4.5**	0	0	0	0	1	0	0	0
1998	OAK	15	15	48	35	13	2.0	0	0	0	0	0	0	0	0
1999	OAK	**16**	**16**	51	33	18	1.5	**1**	**2**	0	**2**	1	1	0	0
2000	GNB	**16**	**16**	37	18	19	0.0	0	0	0	0	0	0	0	0
		154	140	466	374	92	24.5	1	2	0	2	9	6	26	1

== Personal life ==
Maryland has three kids, two daughters and one son, R. J., who is a tight end for the Green Bay Packers.
