= 1989 All-SEC football team =

American college football all-star team

The 1989 All-SEC football team consists of American football players selected to the All-Southeastern Conference (SEC) chosen by various selectors for the 1989 NCAA Division I-A football season.

== Offensive selections ==
=== Receivers ===
- Tony Moss, LSU (AP-1, UPI)
- Thomas Woods, Tennessee (AP-2)
- Willie Green, Ole Miss (AP-2)

=== Tight ends ===
- Lamonde Russell, Alabama (AP-1, UPI)
- Jesse Anderson, Mississippi State (AP-2)

=== Tackles ===
- Mike Pfeifer, Kentucky (AP-1, UPI)
- Terril Chatman, Alabama (AP-1, UPI)
- Curt Mull, Georgia (AP-2)
- John Darden, Florida (AP-2)
- Charles McRae, Tennessee (AP-2)

=== Guards ===
- Ed King, Auburn (AP-1, UPI)
- Eric Still, Tennessee (AP-1, UPI)
- Joel Mazzella, Kentucky (AP-2)
- Ricky Byrd, Mississippi State (AP-2)

=== Centers ===
- Roger Shultz, Alabama (AP-1, UPI)
- John Hudson, Auburn (AP-2)

=== Quarterbacks ===
- Gary Hollingsworth, Alabama (AP-1)
- Tommy Hodson, LSU (AP-2, UPI)

=== Running backs ===
- Siran Stacy, Alabama (AP-1, UPI)
- Emmitt Smith, Florida (College Football Hall of Fame) (AP-1, UPI)
- Chuck Webb, Tennessee (AP-1)
- Rodney Hampton, Georgia (AP-2, UPI)
- Alfred Rawls, Kentucky (AP-2)

== Defensive selections ==
=== Ends ===
- Marion Hobby, Tennessee (AP-1 [as OLB], UPI)
- Tony Bennett, Ole Miss (AP-2, UPI)

=== Tackles ===
- Oliver Barnett, Kentucky (AP-1, UPI)
- David Rocker, Auburn (AP-1, UPI)
- Bill Goldberg, Georgia (AP-1)
- Karl Dunbar, LSU (AP-2)
- Fernando Horn, Auburn (AP-2)

=== Middle guards ===
- Willie Wyatt, Alabama (AP-1, UPI)
- Kelvin Pritchett, Ole Miss (AP-2)

=== Linebackers ===
- Keith McCants, Alabama (AP-1, UPI)
- Craig Ogletree, Auburn (AP-1)
- Quentin Riggins, Auburn (AP-1)
- Huey Richardson, Florida (AP-2, UPI)
- DeMond Winston, Vanderbilt (AP-2, UPI)
- Mo Lewis, Georgia (AP-2)
- James Williams, Mississippi State (AP-2)

=== Backs ===
- Ben Smith, Georgia (AP-1, UPI)
- John Mangum, Alabama (AP-1, UPI)
- Efram Thomas, Alabama (AP-1)
- Richard Fain, Florida (AP-1)
- John Wiley, Auburn (AP-2, UPI)
- Preston Warren, Tennessee (AP-2)
- Bo Russell, Mississippi State (AP-2)
- Chauncey Godwin, Ole Miss (AP-2)

== Special teams ==
=== Kicker ===
- Philip Doyle, Alabama (AP-1)
- David Browndyke, LSU (AP-2, UPI)

=== Punter ===
- Mike Riley, Mississippi State (AP-1)
- Kent Elmore, Tennessee (UPI)
- Rene Bourgeois, LSU (AP-2)

== Key ==
AP = Associated Press

UPI = United Press International

Bold = Consensus first-team selection by both AP and UPI

== See also ==
- 1989 College Football All-America Team
