= Tracy Rocker =

American football player and coach (born 1966)

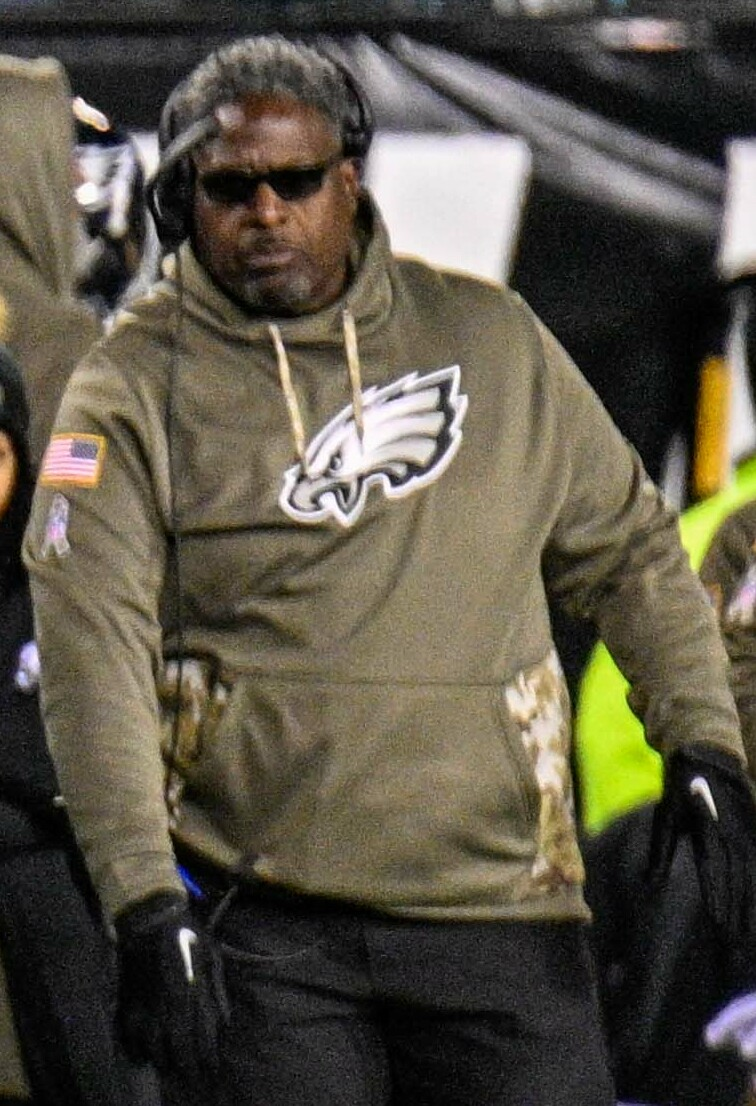
- Rocker in 2022

Personal information
- Born: April 9, 1966 (age 60); Atlanta, Georgia, U.S.
- Listed height: 6 ft 3 in (1.91 m)
- Listed weight: 288 lb (131 kg)

Career information
- Position: Defensive tackle (No. 99)
- High school: Fulton (Atlanta)
- College: Auburn
- NFL draft: 1989: 3rd round, 66th overall pick

Career history

Playing
- Washington Redskins (1989–1990); Orlando Thunder (1992)

Coaching
- Auburn High School (1992–1993) Defensive coordinator; West Alabama (1994–1996) Defensive line coach; Troy State (1997–2001) Defensive line coach; Cincinnati (2002) Defensive line coach; Arkansas (2003–2007) Defensive line coach; Ole Miss (2008) Defensive line coach; Auburn (2009–2010) Defensive line coach; Tennessee Titans (2011–2013) Defensive line coach; Georgia (2014–2016) Defensive line coach and associate head coach; Tennessee (2017–2019) Defensive line coach; South Carolina (2020) Defensive line coach; Philadelphia Eagles (2021–2023) Defensive line coach; Tennessee Titans (2024–2025) Defensive line coach

Awards and highlights
- PFWA All-Rookie Team (1989); SEC Player of the Year (1988); Outland Trophy (1988); Lombardi Award (1988); Unanimous All-American (1988); Consensus All-American (1987); 3× First-team All-SEC (1986, 1987, 1988)

Career NFL statistics
- Sacks: 3
- Fumble recoveries: 1
- Stats at Pro Football Reference
- College Football Hall of Fame

Tracy Quinton Rocker (born April 9, 1966) is an American football coach and former player who most recently served as the defensive line coach for the Tennessee Titans of the National Football League (NFL). He played as a defensive tackle in the NFL.

After playing college football for the Auburn Tigers as a three-time All-Southeastern Conference (SEC) selection (1986–1988), Rocker moved on to the Washington Redskins in the NFL for two seasons (1989–90). The 6 ft 3 in (1.91 m), 288 lb (131 kg) lineman was a major disappointment in his brief pro career, in which he registered 3.0 sacks and one fumble recovery in 24 games, 17 of them starts.

In 1993, Rocker was chosen for the Auburn Team of the Century. He was inducted into the College Football Hall of Fame by the National Football Foundation in December 2004, and one year later, he was afforded the same honor by the Alabama state Sports Hall of Fame.

== Playing career ==
=== High school ===
Rocker played high school football under coach Willie Hunter at Fulton High School in Atlanta, which later merged with Walter F. George High School to become South Atlanta High School.

=== College ===
Rocker was a two-time All-American at Auburn, which he led to a pair of Southeastern Conference titles. In 1988, the senior was named SEC Player of the Year and awarded the Lombardi Award and Outland Trophy, the first player in the conference to achieve the feat. He finished his career with 354 tackles, 21 sacks and 48 tackles for loss.

=== Professional ===
Despite robust success in college, Rocker wasn't selected until the third round of the 1989 NFL draft by the Washington Redskins. Six games into his first season, Rocker assumed a starter role. The retirement of Dave Butz coupled with a knee injury to Markus Koch prompted the move. While not dominant, he showed enough flashes to be named to three Rookie of the Year teams.

After only two seasons with the Redskins, Rocker was released by the team. When no other NFL organization expressed interest in his services, he concluded his playing career with a one-year stint with the Orlando Thunder in the World League of American Football.

== Coaching career ==
Rocker returned to Auburn to complete his undergraduate degree in 1992 and began his coaching career with the Auburn High School Tigers the same year. After serving two seasons as defensive coordinator at the school, he spent three years as a defensive line coach at West Alabama (1994–96).

Prior to his stint at Cincinnati, Rocker spent five seasons as the defensive line coach at Troy State University in Troy, Alabama. While at TSU, three of his players received Division I-AA All-America honors, including Al Lucas, who earned the 1999 Buck Buchanan Award as the top defensive player in Division I-AA. A total of 13 TSU players garnered all-conference accolades under Rocker, while five players went on to sign NFL contracts, including Marcus Spriggs, who was selected by the Cleveland Browns in the sixth round in 1999.

Rocker joined Houston Nutt's staff at Arkansas after one year at Cincinnati where he helped the Bearcats win a share of the 2002 Conference USA (C-USA) title. Rocker spent five years as the defensive line coach of the Razorbacks. His 2006 line ranked fourth in the SEC and thirty-third in the nation in rushing defense, holding opponents to 114.57 yards per game. Arkansas also ranked first in the SEC and twenty-first nationally in tackles for loss with 6.93. When Houston Nutt went to Ole Miss before the 2008 season, Rocker joined his Rebels staff.

In January 2009, Rocker left Ole Miss to coach the defensive line at his alma mater, Auburn University.

He was hired to be the defensive line coach for the Tennessee Titans in February 2011. Rocker's only previous NFL experience as a coach was as a participant in the NFL Minority Coaching Fellowship Program, working with the Indianapolis Colts in 2001 and the Tampa Bay Buccaneers in 2006.

In January 2014, Rocker was let go by the Titans and was hired to be the defensive line coach for the Georgia Bulldogs. On January 12, 2015, Rocker was promoted to associate head coach. On February 7, 2017, Rocker was fired as the Georgia Bulldogs defensive line coach. Rocker was revealed to have committed a minor recruiting violation while at Georgia although the violation was unrelated to his firing. Rocker was hired by the University of Tennessee where he spent two years serving as the defensive line coach. In February 2020, Rocker was hired as defensive line coach at the University of South Carolina.

Following the conclusion of the 2020 football season, the Auburn Tigers bought out his contract and he joined former Gamecock assistant Mike Bobo at Auburn. After a week at Auburn, in 2021, Rocker returned to the NFL to serve as the defensive line coach for the Philadelphia Eagles.

On February 14, 2024, Rocker was named as defensive line coach for the Tennessee Titans.

== Players coached ==
In his first season with the Razorbacks, UA's 2003 defensive line helped the Hogs finish fifth in the SEC in total defense, allowing 344.0 yards per game. In 2004, Rocker coached first-team All-SEC end Jeb Huckeba, who produced 56 tackles, 13 tackles for loss and 6.5 sacks. Huckeba was selected in the fifth round of the NFL Draft. Rocker's 2005 unit tied for second in the SEC with 29 sacks and was fourth in rushing defense behind Jackson, who earned second-team All-SEC honors after finishing fourth on the team with 74 tackles.

Under Rocker's guidance, Jamaal Anderson was the premier pass rusher in the SEC in 2006 with 14 sacks for 100 yards and 20.5 tackles for loss. The honorable mention All-American ranked third nationally in sacks per game with 1.0, while his 20.5 TFL ranked 12th. Anderson also notched 65 tackles and a team-best 26 quarterback hurries. Anderson was selected as the eighth pick of the first round of the 2007 NFL draft, while fellow Razorback defensive lineman Keith Jackson was taken in the seventh round.

In 2010, Rocker coached 2010 Lombardi Award winner, AP All-American defensive lineman, and AP SEC defensive player of the year Nick Fairley, as well as AP second-team All-SEC defensive lineman Antoine Carter. Fairley led the SEC with 21 tackles for loss and was second in the SEC with 10.5 sacks.

Rocker was a member of the Auburn staff which won the 2011 BCS National Championship Game.

== Personal life ==
A native of Atlanta, Rocker and his wife, Lalitha, have a son, Kumar, who is a baseball pitcher for the Texas Rangers.

Rocker's younger brother, David, also attended Auburn and played professional football.
