= Eric Moten =

American football player (1968–2024)

No. 77
- Position: Guard

Personal information
- Born: April 11, 1968; Cleveland, Ohio, U.S.
- Died: August 24, 2024 (aged 56)
- Listed height: 6 ft 3 in (1.91 m)
- Listed weight: 306 lb (139 kg)

Career information
- High school: Shaw (East Cleveland, Ohio)
- College: Michigan State
- NFL draft: 1991: 2nd round, 47th overall pick

Career history
- San Diego Chargers (1991–1996)

Awards and highlights
- PFWA All-Rookie Team (1991); Second-team All-American (1990); First-team All-Big Ten (1990); Second-team All-Big Ten (1989)

Career NFL statistics
- Games played: 67
- Games started: 61
- Fumble recoveries: 2
- Stats at Pro Football Reference

Eric Moten (April 11, 1968 – August 24, 2024) was an American professional football player who was an offensive guard in the National Football League (NFL). He was drafted by and played five years for the San Diego Chargers and was their starting left guard for four of those years. He played college football for the Michigan State Spartans. Moten died on August 24, 2024, at the age of 56.
