= South Atlanta High School =

Public high school in Atlanta, Georgia, United States

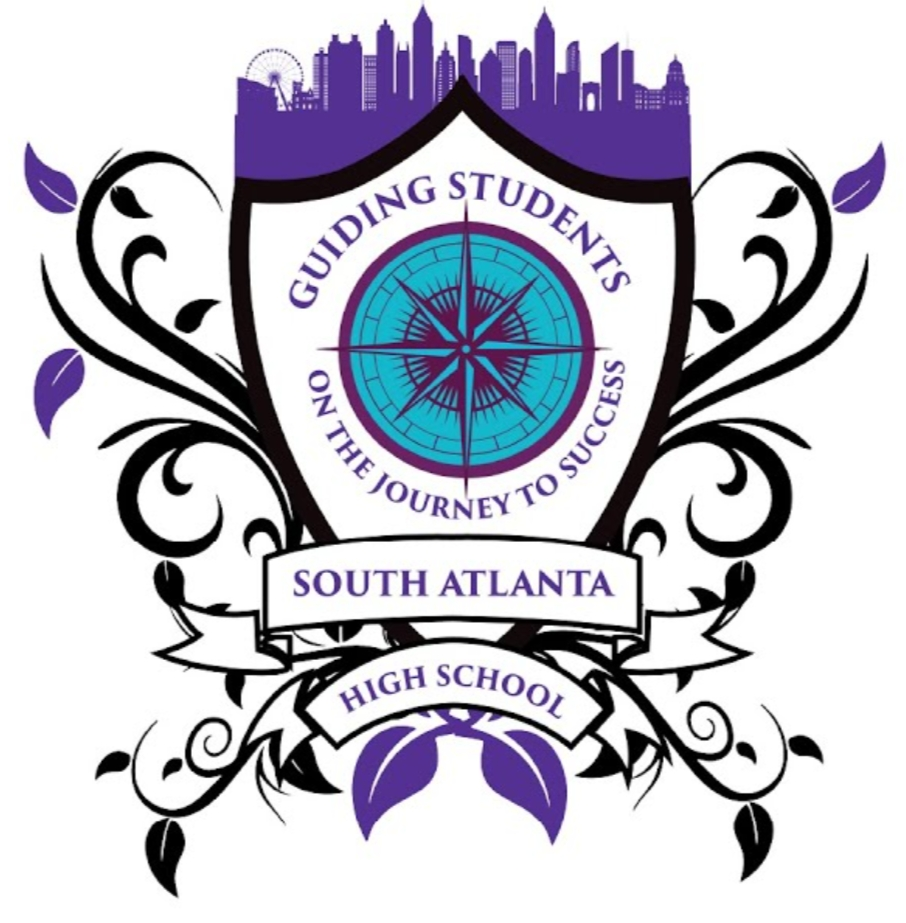

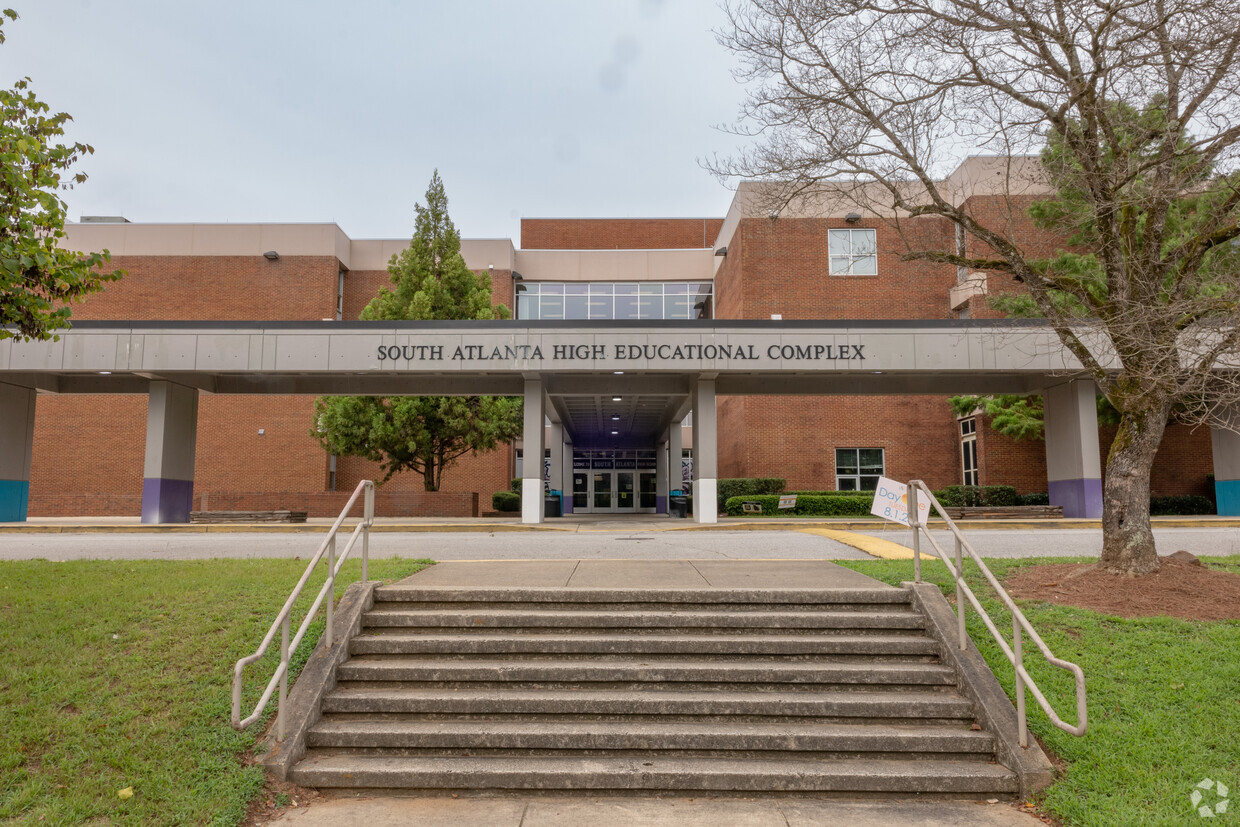

Location
- 800 Hutchens Road; Atlanta, Georgia, Fulton County 30354; United States; 33°40′16″N 84°21′43″W

Information
- School type: Public high school
- Motto: "Guiding Students on the Journey to Success"
- Opened: 1994
- School board: Atlanta Board of Education
- School district: Atlanta Public Schools
- Principal: Phillip Braziel, II
- Teaching staff: 61.70 (FTE)
- Grades: 9-12
- Enrollment: 907 (2023-2024)
- Student to teacher ratio: 14.70
- Education system: Atlanta Public Schools
- Campus: Urban
- Colors: Purple and turquoise
- Mascot: Hornet
- Nickname: Hornets
- Feeder schools: Long Middle School, Price Middle School
- Website: https://www.atlantapublicschools.us/southatlanta

South Atlanta High School is a public high school located in the southeast corner of Atlanta, Georgia, United States. It is located on the site of former George High School, and it formed as the result of the merger of George and nearby Fulton High School. It has been transformed into a campus of four small schools. As of the 2008-2009 school year, it had an enrollment of approximately 1000 students.

== History ==
South Atlanta was established in 1994 after the merger of Walter F. George High School (which was located at the current South Atlanta complex) and Fulton High School (which was located at the present-day Dobbs Elementary near the Lakewood area). George High School hosted a vocational program which offered classes such as woodworking, brickwork, auto mechanics, home economics, and welding. It was also the only high school in Atlanta Public Schools (APS) to have an airplane hangar.

Fulton High School was the only high school in the school system to have four different campuses during its tenure. First, it was located at the corner of Whitehall and Garnett St., second, it moved down Whitehall to the corner of Trinity Street, third, it was located on Washington St. But in 1952 when the City of Atlanta implemented its Plan of Improvement and annexed the area south of McDonough Boulevard, including Lakewood Heights, a new building was built, and Fulton moved to its last site on Jonesboro Road. (It's possible that Fulton County actually built the building in 1950 or '51.) That building was torn down and Dobbs Elementary School replaced it in 2004.

Although Fulton High dates back to 1917, it was not an Atlanta public school until 1952. Prior to that, Fulton, North Fulton, and West Fulton, were in the Fulton County school system until Atlanta annexed the respective areas into the city under its Plan of Improvement.

In 2005, APS implemented the small-schools model at Carver High School. This model is used when a comprehensive high school is divided into a number of career-specific small schools of around 400 or 500 each. Each school has its own administration, but they share athletics and arts programs. The model worked with profound success, so APS decided to convert all of its high schools into small schools. South Atlanta was one of the next two schools to be transformed. In 2006, the building was renovated, and the campus became home to four small schools. The schools are:

- South Atlanta School of Computer Animation and Design
- South Atlanta School of Health and Medical Science
- South Atlanta School of Law and Justice
- South Atlanta School of Leadership and Economic Empowerment

== Notable alumni ==
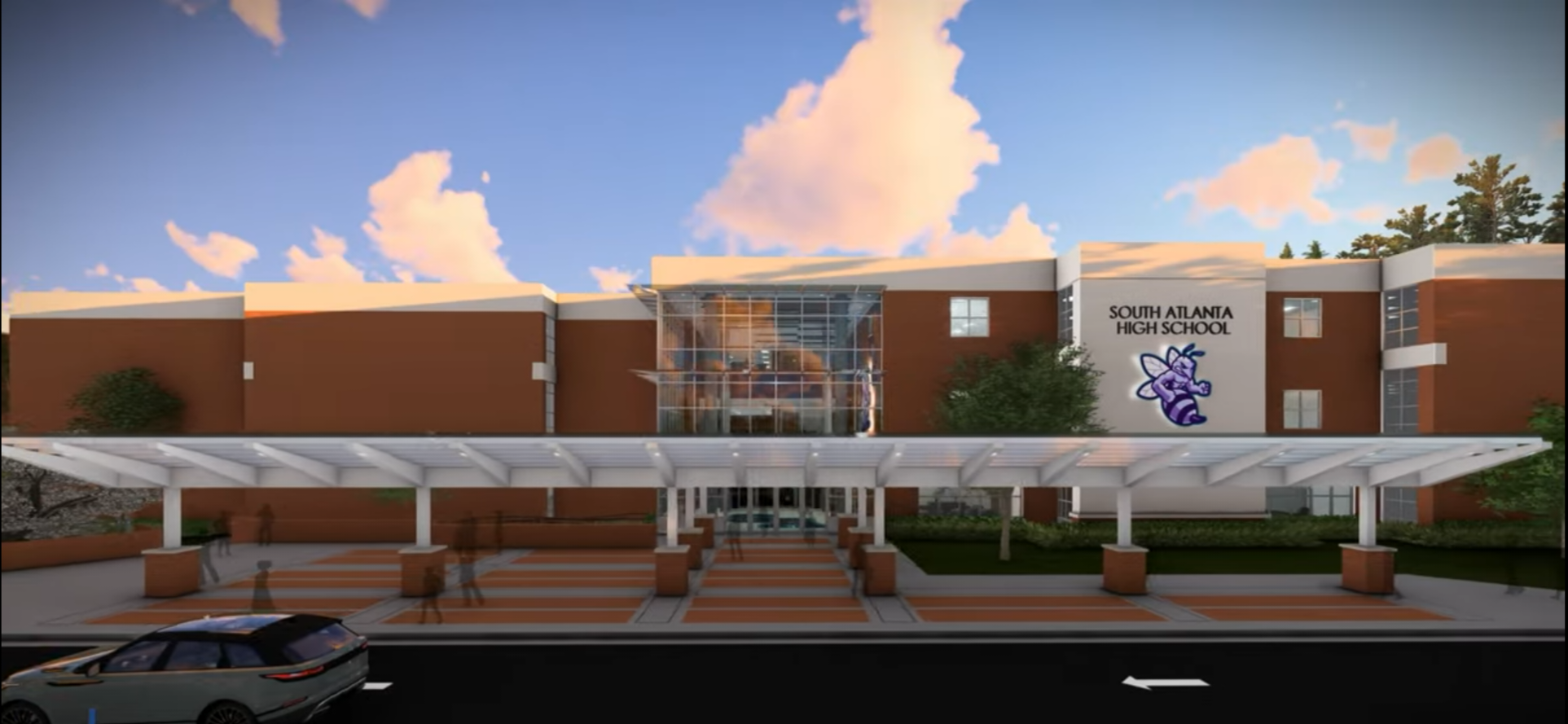
South Atlanta High School future renovation.

- Corey Barlow - former NFL defensive back and collegiate coach
- Keyjuan Brown - college football running back for the Louisville Cardinals
- Derrick Favors - Utah Jazz power forward
- Evander Holyfield (born 1962) - world champion heavyweight boxer
- Daron Jones - member of the band 112
- LaShun Pace - gospel singer
- David Rocker - former NFL defensive tackle, played for the Los Angeles Rams^{†}
- Tracy Rocker - former NFL defensive tackle, defensive line coach for the Philadelphia Eagles
- Trinidad James - rapper
- Marvin Scandrick - member of the band 112
- Young Thug - rapper
