= PFWA NFL All-Rookie Team =

Honorary team recognizing the best rookies per NFL season

Following each National Football League (NFL) season, the Pro Football Writers of America (PFWA) compiles an honorary All-Rookie Team to recognize that season's most outstanding rookies at each position as adjudged by sportswriters of the PFWA. Teams have been selected every year since 1974.

== 1974 ==
Offense

- Quarterback: Tom Owen, San Francisco 49ers
- Running back: Wilbur Jackson, San Francisco 49ers
- Running back: Don Woods, San Diego Chargers
- Wide receiver: Nat Moore, Miami Dolphins
- Wide receiver: Lynn Swann, Pittsburgh Steelers
- Tight end: Paul Seal, New Orleans Saints
- Center: Mike Webster, Pittsburgh Steelers
- Guard: John Hicks, New York Giants
- Guard: Tom Mullen, New York Giants
- Tackle: Charlie Getty, Kansas City Chiefs
- Tackle: Claudie Minor, Denver Broncos

Defense

- Defensive end: John Dutton, Baltimore Colts
- Defensive end: Ed "Too Tall" Jones, Dallas Cowboys
- Defensive tackle: Carl Barzilauskas, New York Jets
- Defensive tackle: Bill Kollar, Cincinnati Bengals
- Outside linebacker: Matt Blair, Minnesota Vikings
- Outside linebacker: Sam Hunt, New England Patriots
- Middle linebacker: Jack Lambert, Pittsburgh Steelers
- Cornerback: Terry Schmidt, New Orleans Saints
- Cornerback: Roscoe Word, New York Jets
- Safety: Prentice McCray, New England Patriots
- Safety: Bill Simpson, Los Angeles Rams

Special teams

- Placekicker: Efrén Herrera, Dallas Cowboys
- Punter: Dave Jennings, New York Giants

== 1975 ==
Offense

- Quarterback: Steve Bartkowski, Atlanta Falcons
- Running back: Don Hardeman, Houston Oilers
- Running back: Mike Thomas, Washington Redskins
- Wide receiver: Freddie Solomon, Miami Dolphins
- Wide receiver: Rick Upchurch, Denver Broncos
- Tight end: Russ Francis, New England Patriots
- Center: Bill Reid, San Francisco 49ers
- Guard: Lynn Boden, Detroit Lions
- Guard: Burton Lawless, Dallas Cowboys
- Tackle: Doug France, Los Angeles Rams
- Tackle: Jeff Sevy, Chicago Bears

Defense

- Defensive end: Mike Hartenstine, Chicago Bears
- Defensive end: Mack Mitchell, Cleveland Browns
- Defensive tackle: Gary Johnson, San Diego Chargers
- Defensive tackle: Louie Kelcher, San Diego Chargers
- Outside linebacker: Robert Brazile, Houston Oilers
- Outside linebacker: Randy White, Dallas Cowboys
- Middle linebacker: Steve Towle, Miami Dolphins
- Cornerback: Neal Colzie, Oakland Raiders
- Cornerback: Louis Wright, Denver Broncos
- Safety: Ed Jones, Buffalo Bills
- Safety: Johnnie Gray, Green Bay Packers

Special teams

- Placekicker: Steve Mike-Mayer, San Francisco 49ers
- Punter: Neil Clabo, Minnesota Vikings

== 1976 ==
Offense

- Quarterback: Jim Zorn, Seattle Seahawks
- Running back: Clark Gaines, New York Jets
- Running back: Chuck Muncie, New Orleans Saints
- Wide receiver: Steve Largent, Seattle Seahawks
- Wide receiver: Sammy White, Minnesota Vikings
- Tight end: David Hill, Detroit Lions
- Center: Randy Cross, San Francisco 49ers
- Guard: Tom Glassic, Denver Broncos
- Guard: Don Macek, San Diego Chargers
- Tackle: Mark Koncar, Green Bay Packers
- Tackle: Dennis Lick, Chicago Bears

Defense

- Defensive end: Gary Burley, Cincinnati Bengals
- Defensive end: Charles Philyaw, Oakland Raiders
- Defensive tackle: Mike Dawson, St. Louis Cardinals
- Defensive tackle: Steve Niehaus, Seattle Seahawks
- Outside linebacker: Greg Buttle, New York Jets
- Outside linebacker: Reggie Williams, Cincinnati Bengals
- Middle linebacker: Harry Carson, New York Giants
- Cornerback: Mario Clark, Buffalo Bills
- Cornerback: Mike Haynes, New England Patriots
- Safety: Tim Fox, New England Patriots
- Safety: James Hunter, Detroit Lions

Special teams

- Placekicker: Chris Bahr, Cincinnati Bengals
- Punter: Rusty Jackson, Los Angeles Rams

== 1977 ==
Offense

- Quarterback: Tommy Kramer, Minnesota Vikings
- Running back: Rob Carpenter, Houston Oilers
- Running back: Tony Dorsett, Dallas Cowboys
- Wide receiver: Billy Waddy, Los Angeles Rams
- Wide receiver: Wesley Walker, New York Jets
- Tight end: Don Hasselbeck, New England Patriots
- Center: Bob Rush, San Diego Chargers
- Guard: George Reihner, Houston Oilers
- Guard: R. C. Thielemann, Atlanta Falcons
- Tackle: Ted Albrecht, Chicago Bears
- Tackle: Warren Bryant, Atlanta Falcons

Defense

- Defensive end: Mike Butler, Green Bay Packers
- Defensive end: A. J. Duhe, Miami Dolphins
- Defensive tackle: Bob Baumhower, Miami Dolphins
- Defensive tackle: Eddie Edwards, Cincinnati Bengals
- Outside linebacker: Kim Bokamper, Miami Dolphins
- Outside linebacker: Bob Brudzinski, Los Angeles Rams
- Middle linebacker: Terry Beeson, Seattle Seahawks
- Cornerback: Raymond Clayborn, New England Patriots
- Cornerback: Gary Green, Kansas City Chiefs
- Safety: Bill Currier, Houston Oilers
- Safety: Vern Roberson, Miami Dolphins

Special teams

- Placekicker: Rafael Septién, Los Angeles Rams
- Punter: Bucky Dilts, Denver Broncos

== 1978 ==
Offense

- Quarterback: Doug Williams, Tampa Bay Buccaneers
- Running back: Earl Campbell, Houston Oilers
- Running back: Terry Miller, Buffalo Bills
- Wide receiver: John Jefferson, San Diego Chargers
- Wide receiver: James Lofton, Green Bay Packers
- Tight end: Ozzie Newsome, Cleveland Browns
- Center: Blair Bush, Cincinnati Bengals
- Guard: Walt Downing, San Francisco 49ers
- Guard: Homer Elias, Detroit Lions
- Tackle: Mike Kenn, Atlanta Falcons
- Tackle: Chris Ward, New York Jets

Defense

- Defensive end: Al Baker, Detroit Lions
- Defensive end: Ross Browner, Cincinnati Bengals
- Defensive tackle: Dee Hardison, Buffalo Bills
- Defensive tackle: Don Latimer, Denver Broncos
- Outside linebacker: John Anderson, Green Bay Packers
- Outside linebacker: Reggie Wilkes, Philadelphia Eagles
- Middle linebacker: Dan Bunz, San Francisco 49ers
- Cornerback: Bobby Jackson, New York Jets
- Cornerback: Ron Johnson, Pittsburgh Steelers
- Safety: Ken Greene, St. Louis Cardinals
- Safety: John Harris, Seattle Seahawks

Special teams

- Placekicker: Frank Corral, Los Angeles Rams
- Punter: Tom Skladany, Detroit Lions

== 1979 ==
Offense

- Quarterback: Phil Simms, New York Giants
- Running back: Ottis Anderson, St. Louis Cardinals
- Running back: William Andrews, Atlanta Falcons
- Wide receiver: Jerry Butler, Buffalo Bills
- Wide receiver: Earnest Gray, New York Giants
- Tight end: Dan Ross, Cincinnati Bengals
- Center: Mark Dennard, Miami Dolphins
- Guard: Cody Risien, Cleveland Browns
- Guard: Greg Roberts, Tampa Bay Buccaneers
- Tackle: Keith Dorney, Detroit Lions
- Tackle: Dave Studdard, Denver Broncos

Defense

- Defensive end: Jesse Baker, Houston Oilers
- Defensive end: Dan Hampton, Chicago Bears
- Defensive tackle: Fred Smerlas, Buffalo Bills
- Defensive tackle: Manu Tuiasosopo, Seattle Seahawks
- Outside linebacker: Jim Haslett, Buffalo Bills
- Outside linebacker: Jerry Robinson, Philadelphia Eagles
- Middle linebacker: Stan Blinka, New York Jets
- Cornerback: Larry Braziel, Baltimore Colts
- Cornerback: Henry Williams, Oakland Raiders
- Safety: Vernon Perry, Houston Oilers
- Safety: Brenard Wilson, Philadelphia Eagles

Special teams

- Placekicker: Tony Franklin, Philadelphia Eagles
- Punter: Bob Grupp, Kansas City Chiefs

== 1980 ==
Offense

- Quarterback: David Woodley, Miami Dolphins
- Running back: Joe Cribbs, Buffalo Bills
- Running back: Billy Sims, Detroit Lions
- Wide receiver: Ray Butler, Baltimore Colts
- Wide receiver: Art Monk, Washington Redskins
- Tight end: Junior Miller, Atlanta Falcons
- Center: Tommie Ginn, Detroit Lions
- Guard: Tyrone McGriff, Pittsburgh Steelers
- Guard: Ray Snell, Tampa Bay Buccaneers
- Tackle: Stan Brock, New Orleans Saints
- Tackle: Anthony Muñoz, Cincinnati Bengals

Defense

- Defensive end: Jacob Green, Seattle Seahawks
- Defensive end: Rulon Jones, Denver Broncos
- Defensive tackle: Rush Brown, St. Louis Cardinals
- Defensive tackle: Jim Stuckey, San Francisco 49ers
- Outside linebacker: Bobby Leopold, San Francisco 49ers
- Outside linebacker: Al Richardson, Atlanta Falcons
- Middle linebacker: Buddy Curry, Atlanta Falcons
- Cornerback: Don McNeal, Miami Dolphins
- Cornerback: Roynell Young, Philadelphia Eagles
- Safety: Johnnie Johnson, Los Angeles Rams
- Safety: Darrol Ray, New York Jets

Special teams

- Placekicker: Eddie Murray, Detroit Lions
- Punter: Jim Miller, San Francisco 49ers

== 1981 ==
Offense

- Quarterback: Neil Lomax, St. Louis Cardinals
- Running back: Joe Delaney, Kansas City Chiefs
- Running back: George Rogers, New Orleans Saints
- Wide receiver: Cris Collinsworth, Cincinnati Bengals
- Wide receiver: Ken Margerum, Chicago Bears
- Tight end: Greg LaFleur, St. Louis Cardinals
- Center: John Scully, Atlanta Falcons
- Guard: Billy Ard, New York Giants
- Guard: Curt Marsh, Oakland Raiders
- Tackle: Joe Jacoby, Washington Redskins
- Tackle: Keith Van Horne, Chicago Bears

Defense

- Defensive end: Curtis Green, Detroit Lions
- Defensive end: Donnell Thompson, Baltimore Colts
- Defensive tackle: Bill Neill, New York Giants
- Defensive tackle: Johnny Robinson, Oakland Raiders
- Outside linebacker: Hugh Green, Tampa Bay Buccaneers
- Outside linebacker: Lawrence Taylor, New York Giants
- Middle linebacker: Mike Singletary, Chicago Bears
- Cornerback: Ronnie Lott, San Francisco 49ers
- Cornerback: Everson Walls, Dallas Cowboys
- Safety: Kenny Easley, Seattle Seahawks
- Safety: Carlton Williamson, San Francisco 49ers

Special teams

- Placekicker: Mick Luckhurst, Atlanta Falcons
- Punter: Tom Orosz, Miami Dolphins

== 1982 ==
Offense

- Quarterback: Jim McMahon, Chicago Bears
- Running back: Marcus Allen, Los Angeles Raiders
- Running back: Butch Woolfolk, New York Giants
- Wide receiver: Charlie Brown, Washington Redskins
- Wide receiver: Lindsay Scott, New Orleans Saints
- Tight end: Pete Metzelaars, Seattle Seahawks
- Center: Rich Umphrey, New York Giants
- Guard: Brad Edelman, New Orleans Saints
- Guard: Sean Farrell, Tampa Bay Buccaneers
- Tackle: Tootie Robbins, St. Louis Cardinals
- Tackle: Luis Sharpe, St. Louis Cardinals

Defense

- Defensive end: Bruce Clark, New Orleans Saints
- Defensive end: Kenneth Sims, New England Patriots
- Defensive tackle: Lester Williams, New England Patriots
- Defensive tackle: Leo Wisniewski, Baltimore Colts
- Outside linebacker: Chip Banks, Cleveland Browns
- Outside linebacker: Johnie Cooks, Baltimore Colts
- Middle linebacker: Tom Cousineau, Cleveland Browns
- Cornerback: Vernon Dean, Washington Redskins
- Cornerback: Bobby Watkins, Detroit Lions
- Safety: Benny Perrin, St. Louis Cardinals
- Safety: Andre Young, San Diego Chargers

Special teams

- Placekicker: Gary Anderson, Pittsburgh Steelers
- Punter: Rohn Stark, Baltimore Colts

== 1983 ==
Offense

- Quarterback: Dan Marino, Miami Dolphins
- Running back: Eric Dickerson, Los Angeles Rams
- Running back: Curt Warner, Seattle Seahawks
- Wide receiver: Jeff Chadwick, Detroit Lions
- Wide receiver: Willie Gault, Chicago Bears
- Tight end: Tony Hunter, Buffalo Bills
- Center: Dave Rimington, Cincinnati Bengals
- Guard: Chris Hinton, Baltimore Colts
- Guard: Bruce Matthews, Houston Oilers
- Tackle: Jim Covert, Chicago Bears
- Tackle: Harvey Salem, Houston Oilers

Defense

- Defensive end: Mike Pitts, Atlanta Falcons
- Defensive end: Greg Townsend, Los Angeles Raiders
- Defensive tackle: Bill Pickel, Los Angeles Raiders
- Defensive tackle: Andrew Provence, Atlanta Falcons
- Outside linebacker: John Rade, Atlanta Falcons
- Outside linebacker: Vernon Maxwell, Baltimore Colts
- Middle linebacker: Mike Green, San Diego Chargers
- Cornerback: Darrell Green, Washington Redskins
- Cornerback: Danny Walters, San Diego Chargers
- Safety: Bill Bates, Dallas Cowboys
- Safety: Terry Kinard, New York Giants

Special teams

- Placekicker: Ali Haji-Sheikh, New York Giants
- Punter: Reggie Roby, Miami Dolphins

== 1984 ==
Offense

- Quarterback: Warren Moon, Houston Oilers
- Running back: Alfred Anderson, Minnesota Vikings
- Running back: Greg Bell, Buffalo Bills
- Wide receiver: Louis Lipps, Pittsburgh Steelers
- Wide receiver: Daryl Turner, Seattle Seahawks
- Tight end: Clarence Kay, Denver Broncos
- Center: Jim Sweeney, New York Jets
- Guard: Brian Blados, Cincinnati Bengals
- Guard: Ron Solt, Indianapolis Colts
- Tackle: Ron Heller, Tampa Bay Buccaneers
- Tackle: Dean Steinkuhler, Houston Oilers

Defense

- Defensive end: Alphonso Carreker, Green Bay Packers
- Defensive end: Blaise Winter, Indianapolis Colts
- Defensive tackle: Bill Maas, Kansas City Chiefs
- Outside linebacker: Carl Banks, New York Giants
- Outside linebacker: Keith Browner, Tampa Bay Buccaneers
- Inside linebacker: Eugene Lockhart, Dallas Cowboys
- Inside linebacker: Gary Reasons, New York Giants
- Cornerback: Frank Minnifield, Cleveland Browns
- Cornerback: Kevin Ross, Kansas City Chiefs
- Safety: Tom Flynn, Green Bay Packers
- Safety: Don Rogers, Cleveland Browns

Special teams

- Placekicker: Paul McFadden, Philadelphia Eagles
- Punter: Brian Hansen, New Orleans Saints

== 1985 ==
Offense

- Quarterback: Dieter Brock, Los Angeles Rams
- Running back: Gary Anderson, San Diego Chargers
- Running back: Kevin Mack, Cleveland Browns
- Wide receiver: Eddie Brown, Cincinnati Bengals
- Wide receiver: Jerry Rice, San Francisco 49ers
- Tight end: Mark Bavaro, New York Giants
- Center: Bart Oates, New York Giants
- Guard: Bill Fralic, Atlanta Falcons
- Guard: Tom Thayer, Chicago Bears
- Tackle: Lomas Brown, Detroit Lions
- Tackle: Jim Lachey, San Diego Chargers

Defense

- Defensive end: Ray Childress, Houston Oilers
- Defensive end: Garin Veris, New England Patriots
- Defensive tackle: Tim Newton, Minnesota Vikings
- Outside linebacker: Duane Bickett, Indianapolis Colts
- Outside linebacker: Chris Doleman, Minnesota Vikings
- Inside linebacker: Jack Del Rio, New Orleans Saints
- Inside linebacker: Brian Noble, Green Bay Packers
- Cornerback: Derrick Burroughs, Buffalo Bills
- Cornerback: John Hendy, San Diego Chargers
- Safety: Raphel Cherry, Washington Redskins
- Safety: Lonnie Young, St. Louis Cardinals

Special teams

- Placekicker: Kevin Butler, Chicago Bears
- Punter: Dale Hatcher, Los Angeles Rams

== 1986 ==
Offense

- Quarterback: Jim Everett, Los Angeles Rams
- Running back: Rueben Mayes, New Orleans Saints
- Running back: John Williams, Seattle Seahawks
- Wide receiver: Bill Brooks, Indianapolis Colts
- Wide receiver: Ernest Givins, Houston Oilers
- Tight end: Greg Baty, New England Patriots
- Center: Matt Darwin, Philadelphia Eagles
- Guard: Tom Newberry, Los Angeles Rams
- Guard: Will Wolford, Buffalo Bills
- Tackle: Brian Jozwiak, Kansas City Chiefs
- Tackle: J. D. Maarleveld, Tampa Bay Buccaneers

Defense

- Defensive end: Leslie O'Neal, San Diego Chargers
- Defensive end: Brent Williams, New England Patriots
- Defensive tackle: Tony Casillas, Atlanta Falcons
- Defensive tackle: Reggie Singletary, Philadelphia Eagles
- Outside linebacker: Tim Cofield, Kansas City Chiefs
- Outside linebacker: Charles Haley, San Francisco 49ers
- Inside linebacker: Dino Hackett, Kansas City Chiefs
- Inside linebacker: John Offerdahl, Miami Dolphins
- Cornerback: Don Griffin, San Francisco 49ers
- Cornerback: Tim McKyer, San Francisco 49ers
- Safety: David Fulcher, Cincinnati Bengals
- Safety: Devon Mitchell, Detroit Lions

Special teams

- Placekicker: John Lee, St. Louis Cardinals
- Punter: John Teltschik, Philadelphia Eagles

== 1987 ==
Offense

- Quarterback: Vinny Testaverde, Tampa Bay Buccaneers
- Running back: Christian Okoye, Kansas City Chiefs
- Running back: Troy Stradford, Miami Dolphins
- Wide receiver: Ricky Nattiel, Denver Broncos
- Wide receiver: Frankie Neal, Green Bay Packers
- Tight end: Rob Awalt, St. Louis Cardinals
- Center: No selection
- Guard: Todd Peat, St. Louis Cardinals
- Guard: Steve Trapilo, New Orleans Saints
- Tackle: Bruce Armstrong, New England Patriots
- Tackle: Harris Barton, San Francisco 49ers

Defense

- Defensive end: John Bosa, Miami Dolphins
- Defensive end: Shawn Knight, New Orleans Saints
- Defensive tackle: Jerry Ball, Detroit Lions
- Defensive tackle: Jerome Brown, Philadelphia Eagles
- Outside linebacker: Cornelius Bennett, Buffalo Bills
- Outside linebacker: Alex Gordon, New York Jets
- Inside linebacker: Brian Bosworth, Seattle Seahawks
- Inside linebacker: Shane Conlan, Buffalo Bills
- Cornerback: Delton Hall, Pittsburgh Steelers
- Cornerback: Nate Odomes, Buffalo Bills
- Safety: Gene Atkins, New Orleans Saints
- Safety: Thomas Everett, Pittsburgh Steelers

Special teams

- Placekicker: Jeff Jaeger, Cleveland Browns
- Punter: Ruben Rodriguez, Seattle Seahawks

== 1988 ==
Offense

- Quarterback: Chris Chandler, Indianapolis Colts
- Running back: John Stephens, New England Patriots
- Running back: Ickey Woods, Cincinnati Bengals
- Wide receiver: Brian Blades, Seattle Seahawks
- Wide receiver: Tim Brown, Los Angeles Raiders
- Tight end: Keith Jackson, Philadelphia Eagles
- Center: No selection
- Guard: Randall McDaniel, Minnesota Vikings
- Guard: Eric Moore, New York Giants
- Tackle: Jumbo Elliott, New York Giants
- Tackle: Paul Gruber, Tampa Bay Buccaneers

Defense

- Defensive end: Michael Dean Perry, Cleveland Browns
- Defensive end: Danny Stubbs, San Francisco 49ers
- Defensive tackle: Tim Goad, New England Patriots
- Defensive tackle: Pierce Holt, San Francisco 49ers
- Outside linebacker: Aundray Bruce, Atlanta Falcons
- Outside linebacker: O'Brien Alston, Indianapolis Colts
- Outside linebacker: Bill Romanowski, San Francisco 49ers
- Inside linebacker: Sidney Coleman, Tampa Bay Buccaneers
- Inside linebacker: Chris Spielman, Detroit Lions
- Cornerback: Eric Allen, Philadelphia Eagles
- Cornerback: James Hasty, New York Jets
- Safety: Bennie Blades, Detroit Lions
- Safety: Erik McMillan, New York Jets

Special teams

- Placekicker: Chip Lohmiller, Washington Redskins
- Punter: Jeff Feagles, New England Patriots

== 1989 ==
Offense

- Quarterback: Troy Aikman, Dallas Cowboys
- Running back: Barry Sanders, Detroit Lions
- Running back: Bobby Humphrey, Denver Broncos
- Wide receiver: Shawn Collins, Atlanta Falcons
- Wide receiver: Andre Rison, Indianapolis Colts
- Tight end: Travis McNeal, Seattle Seahawks
- Center: Courtney Hall, San Diego Chargers
- Guard: Steve Wisniewski, Los Angeles Raiders
- Guard: Joe Wolf, Phoenix Cardinals
- Tackle: Kevin Haverdink, New Orleans Saints
- Tackle: Andy Heck, Seattle Seahawks

Defense

- Defensive end: Trace Armstrong, Chicago Bears
- Defensive end: Burt Grossman, San Diego Chargers
- Defensive tackle: Bill Hawkins, Los Angeles Rams
- Defensive tackle: Tracy Rocker, Washington Redskins
- Outside linebacker: Jeff Lageman, New York Jets
- Outside linebacker: Derrick Thomas, Kansas City Chiefs
- Middle linebacker: Jerry Olsavsky, Pittsburgh Steelers
- Cornerback: Robert Massey, New Orleans Saints
- Cornerback: Deion Sanders, Atlanta Falcons
- Safety: Steve Atwater, Denver Broncos
- Safety: Carnell Lake, Detroit Lions

Special teams

- Placekicker: Chris Jacke, Green Bay Packers
- Punter: Chris Mohr, Tampa Bay Buccaneers

== 1990 ==
Offense

- Quarterback: Jeff George, Indianapolis Colts
- Running back: Johnny Johnson, Phoenix Cardinals
- Running back: Emmitt Smith, Dallas Cowboys
- Wide receiver: Fred Barnett, Philadelphia Eagles
- Wide receiver: Rob Moore, New York Jets
- Wide receiver: Ricky Proehl, Phoenix Cardinals
- Tight end: Eric Green, Pittsburgh Steelers
- Center: Tim Grunhard, Kansas City Chiefs
- Guard: Keith Sims, Miami Dolphins
- Guard: Dave Szott, Kansas City Chiefs
- Tackle: Leo Goeas, San Diego Chargers
- Tackle: Richmond Webb, Miami Dolphins

Defense

- Defensive end: Ray Agnew, New England Patriots
- Defensive end: Renaldo Turnbull, New Orleans Saints
- Defensive tackle: Jimmie Jones, Dallas Cowboys
- Defensive tackle: Cortez Kennedy, Seattle Seahawks
- Outside linebacker: James Francis, Cincinnati Bengals
- Outside linebacker: Aaron Wallace, Los Angeles Raiders
- Middle linebacker: Percy Snow, Kansas City Chiefs
- Cornerback: Ben Smith, Philadelphia Eagles
- Cornerback: James Williams, Buffalo Bills
- Safety: Robert Blackmon, Seattle Seahawks
- Safety: Mark Carrier, Chicago Bears

Special teams

- Placekicker: Steve Christie, Tampa Bay Buccaneers
- Punter: No selection

== 1991 ==
Offense

- Quarterback: No selection
- Running back: Ricky Ervins, Washington Redskins
- Running back: Leonard Russell, New England Patriots
- Wide receiver: Lawrence Dawsey, Tampa Bay Buccaneers
- Wide receiver: Mike Pritchard, Atlanta Falcons
- Tight end: Adrian Cooper, Pittsburgh Steelers
- Center: John Flannery, Houston Oilers
- Guard: Ed King, Cleveland Browns
- Guard: Eric Moten, San Diego Chargers
- Tackle: Antone Davis, Philadelphia Eagles
- Tackle: Pat Harlow, New England Patriots

Defense

- Defensive end: Phil Hansen, Buffalo Bills
- Defensive end: Kenny Walker, Denver Broncos
- Defensive tackle: Moe Gardner, Atlanta Falcons
- Defensive tackle: Russell Maryland, Dallas Cowboys
- Outside linebacker: Mike Croel, Denver Broncos
- Outside linebacker: Mo Lewis, New York Jets
- Inside linebacker: Darrick Brownlow, Dallas Cowboys
- Inside linebacker: Keith Traylor, Denver Broncos
- Cornerback: Larry Brown, Dallas Cowboys
- Cornerback: Aeneas Williams, Phoenix Cardinals
- Safety: Stanley Richard, San Diego Chargers
- Safety: Eric Turner, Cleveland Browns

Special teams

- Placekicker: John Kasay, Seattle Seahawks
- Punter: No selection

== 1992 ==
Offense

- Quarterback: David Klingler, Cincinnati Bengals
- Running back: Vaughn Dunbar, New Orleans Saints
- Running back: Amp Lee, San Francisco 49ers
- Wide receiver: Carl Pickens, Cincinnati Bengals
- Wide receiver: Arthur Marshall, Denver Broncos
- Tight end: Johnny Mitchell, New York Jets
- Center: Matt Elliott, Washington Redskins
- Guard: No selection
- Guard: No selection
- Tackle: Troy Auzenne, Chicago Bears
- Tackle: Eugene Chung, New England Patriots

Defense

- Defensive end: Santana Dotson, Tampa Bay Buccaneers
- Defensive end: Chris Mims, San Diego Chargers
- Defensive tackle: Steve Emtman, Indianapolis Colts
- Defensive tackle: Sean Gilbert, Los Angeles Rams
- Outside linebacker: Quentin Coryatt, Indianapolis Colts
- Outside linebacker: Marco Coleman, Miami Dolphins
- Inside linebacker: Robert Jones, Dallas Cowboys
- Inside linebacker: Ricardo McDonald, Cincinnati Bengals
- Cornerback: Dale Carter, Kansas City Chiefs
- Cornerback: Troy Vincent, Miami Dolphins
- Safety: Dana Hall, San Francisco 49ers
- Safety: Darren Perry, Pittsburgh Steelers

Special teams

- Placekicker: Jason Hanson, Detroit Lions
- Punter: Klaus Wilmsmeyer, San Francisco 49ers
- Kickoff returner: Desmond Howard, Washington Redskins
- Punt returner: Dale Carter, Kansas City Chiefs
- Special teams: Darren Woodson, Dallas Cowboys

== 1993 ==
Offense

- Quarterback: Rick Mirer, Seattle Seahawks
- Running back: Jerome Bettis, Los Angeles Rams
- Running back: Reggie Brooks, Washington Redskins
- Wide receiver: Vincent Brisby, New England Patriots
- Wide receiver: James Jett, Los Angeles Raiders
- Tight end: Tony McGee, Cincinnati Bengals
- Center: Steve Everitt, Cleveland Browns
- Guard: Lincoln Kennedy, Atlanta Falcons
- Guard: Will Shields, Kansas City Chiefs
- Tackle: Brad Hopkins, Houston Oilers
- Tackle: Willie Roaf, New Orleans Saints

Defense

- Defensive end: John Copeland, Cincinnati Bengals
- Defensive end: Eric Curry, Tampa Bay Buccaneers
- Defensive tackle: Leonard Renfro, Philadelphia Eagles
- Defensive tackle: Dana Stubblefield, San Francisco 49ers
- Outside linebacker: Darrin Smith, Dallas Cowboys
- Outside linebacker: Wayne Simmons, Green Bay Packers
- Inside linebacker: Chad Brown, Pittsburgh Steelers
- Inside linebacker: Steve Tovar, Cincinnati Bengals
- Cornerback: Tom Carter, Washington Redskins
- Cornerback: Darrien Gordon, San Diego Chargers
- Safety: Roger Harper, Atlanta Falcons
- Safety: George Teague, Green Bay Packers

Special teams

- Placekicker: Jason Elam, Denver Broncos
- Punter: John Jett, Dallas Cowboys
- Kickoff returner: Tyrone Hughes, New Orleans Saints
- Punt returner: Tyrone Hughes, New Orleans Saints
- Special teams: Jessie Armstead, New York Giants

== 1994 ==
Offense

- Quarterback: Heath Shuler, Washington Redskins
- Running back: Marshall Faulk, Indianapolis Colts
- Running back: Errict Rhett, Tampa Bay Buccaneers
- Wide receiver: Derrick Alexander, Cleveland Browns
- Wide receiver: Darnay Scott, Cincinnati Bengals
- Tight end: Andrew Jordan, Minnesota Vikings
- Center: Kevin Mawae, Seattle Seahawks
- Guard: Joe Panos, Philadelphia Eagles
- Guard: Anthony Redmon, Arizona Cardinals
- Tackle: Larry Allen, Dallas Cowboys
- Tackle: Todd Steussie, Minnesota Vikings

Defense

- Defensive end: Sam Adams, Seattle Seahawks
- Defensive end: Joe Johnson, New Orleans Saints
- Defensive tackle: Tim Bowens, Miami Dolphins
- Defensive tackle: Bryant Young, San Francisco 49ers
- Linebacker: Aubrey Beavers, Miami Dolphins
- Linebacker: Rob Fredrickson, Los Angeles Raiders
- Linebacker: Willie McGinest, New England Patriots
- Linebacker: Lee Woodall, San Francisco 49ers
- Cornerback: Antonio Langham, Cleveland Browns
- Cornerback: Dewayne Washington, Minnesota Vikings
- Safety: Keith Lyle, Los Angeles Rams
- Safety: Darryl Morrison, Washington Redskins

Special teams

- Placekicker: Chris Boniol, Dallas Cowboys
- Punter: Pat O'Neill, New England Patriots
- Kickoff returner: Andre Coleman, San Diego Chargers
- Punt returner: Jeff Burris, Buffalo Bills
- Special teams: Sam Rogers, Buffalo Bills

== 1995 ==
Offense

- Quarterback: Kerry Collins, Carolina Panthers
- Running back: Terrell Davis, Denver Broncos
- Running back: Curtis Martin, New England Patriots
- Wide receiver: Joey Galloway, Seattle Seahawks
- Wide receiver: Chris Sanders, Houston Oilers
- Tight end: Ken Dilger, Indianapolis Colts
- Center: Dave Wohlabaugh, New England Patriots
- Guard: Ruben Brown, Buffalo Bills
- Guard: Brenden Stai, Pittsburgh Steelers
- Tackle: Tony Boselli, Jacksonville Jaguars
- Tackle: Blake Brockermeyer, Carolina Panthers

Defense

- Defensive end: Hugh Douglas, New York Jets
- Defensive end: Mike Mamula, Philadelphia Eagles
- Defensive tackle: Warren Sapp, Tampa Bay Buccaneers
- Defensive tackle: Gary Walker, Houston Oilers
- Linebacker: Derrick Brooks, Tampa Bay Buccaneers
- Linebacker: Mark Fields, New Orleans Saints
- Linebacker: Ted Johnson, New England Patriots
- Cornerback: Tyrone Poole, Carolina Panthers
- Cornerback: Bobby Taylor, Philadelphia Eagles
- Safety: Devin Bush, Atlanta Falcons
- Safety: Orlando Thomas, Minnesota Vikings

Special teams

- Placekicker: Cole Ford, Oakland Raiders
- Punter: Tom Hutton, Philadelphia Eagles
- Kickoff returner: Tamarick Vanover, Kansas City Chiefs
- Punt returner: Tamarick Vanover, Kansas City Chiefs
- Special teams: Chad Cascadden, New York Jets

== 1996 ==
Offense

- Quarterback: Tony Banks, St. Louis Rams
- Running back: Karim Abdul-Jabbar, Miami Dolphins
- Running back: Eddie George, Houston Oilers
- Wide receiver: Terry Glenn, New England Patriots
- Wide receiver: Eddie Kennison, St. Louis Rams
- Tight end: Jason Dunn, Philadelphia Eagles
- Center: Aaron Graham, Arizona Cardinals
- Guard: Jeff Hartings, Detroit Lions
- Guard: Jonathan Ogden, Baltimore Ravens
- Tackle: Willie Anderson, Cincinnati Bengals
- Tackle: John Michels, Green Bay Packers

Defense

- Defensive end: Tony Brackens, Jacksonville Jaguars
- Defensive end: Simeon Rice, Arizona Cardinals
- Defensive tackle: Daryl Gardener, Miami Dolphins
- Defensive tackle: Devin Wyman, New England Patriots
- Linebacker: Kevin Hardy, Jacksonville Jaguars
- Linebacker: John Mobley, Denver Broncos
- Linebacker: Zach Thomas, Miami Dolphins
- Cornerback: Donnie Abraham, Tampa Bay Buccaneers
- Cornerback: Walt Harris, Chicago Bears
- Safety: Brian Dawkins, Philadelphia Eagles
- Safety: Lawyer Milloy, New England Patriots

Special teams

- Placekicker: Adam Vinatieri, New England Patriots
- Punter: No selection
- Kickoff returner: Eric Moulds, Buffalo Bills
- Punt returner: Eddie Kennison, St. Louis Rams
- Special teams: Larry Izzo, Miami Dolphins

== 1997 ==
Offense

- Quarterback: Jake Plummer, Arizona Cardinals
- Running back: Corey Dillon, Cincinnati Bengals
- Running back: Warrick Dunn, Tampa Bay Buccaneers
- Wide receiver: Reidel Anthony, Tampa Bay Buccaneers
- Wide receiver: Rae Carruth, Carolina Panthers
- Tight end: Tony Gonzalez, Kansas City Chiefs
- Center: Calvin Collins, Atlanta Falcons
- Guard: Tarik Glenn, Indianapolis Colts
- Guard: Frank Middleton, Tampa Bay Buccaneers
- Tackle: Walter Jones, Seattle Seahawks
- Tackle: Ross Verba, Green Bay Packers

Defense

- Defensive end: Darrell Russell, Oakland Raiders
- Defensive end: Jason Taylor, Miami Dolphins
- Defensive tackle: Antonio Anderson, Dallas Cowboys
- Defensive tackle: Renaldo Wynn, Jacksonville Jaguars
- Outside linebacker: Peter Boulware, Baltimore Ravens
- Outside linebacker: Dexter Coakley, Dallas Cowboys
- Middle linebacker: Matt Russell, Detroit Lions
- Cornerback: Shawn Springs, Seattle Seahawks
- Cornerback: Bryant Westbrook, Detroit Lions
- Safety: Sam Garnes, New York Giants
- Safety: Sammy Knight, New Orleans Saints

Special teams

- Placekicker: John Hall, New York Jets
- Punter: Ken Walter, Carolina Panthers
- Kickoff returner: Byron Hanspard, Atlanta Falcons
- Punt returner: Leon Johnson, New York Jets
- Special teams: No selection

== 1998 ==
Offense

- Quarterback: Peyton Manning, Indianapolis Colts
- Running back: Rob Edwards, New England Patriots
- Running back: Fred Taylor, Jacksonville Jaguars
- Wide receiver: Randy Moss, Minnesota Vikings
- Wide receiver: Jerome Pathon, Indianapolis Colts
- Tight end: Cam Cleeland, New Orleans Saints
- Center: Kevin Long, Tennessee Oilers
- Guard: Steve McKinney, Indianapolis Colts
- Guard: Kyle Turley, New Orleans Saints
- Tackle: Jason Fabini, New York Jets
- Tackle: Ephraim Salaam, Atlanta Falcons

Defense

- Defensive end: Vonnie Holliday, Green Bay Packers
- Defensive end: Andre Wadsworth, Arizona Cardinals
- Defensive tackle: Larry Chester, Indianapolis Colts
- Defensive tackle: Brandon Whiting, Philadelphia Eagles
- Linebacker: Sam Cowart, Buffalo Bills
- Linebacker: Anthony Simmons, Seattle Seahawks
- Linebacker: Takeo Spikes, Cincinnati Bengals
- Cornerback: Terry Fair, Detroit Lions
- Cornerback: Charles Woodson, Oakland Raiders
- Safety: Donovin Darius, Jacksonville Jaguars
- Safety: Tony Parrish, Chicago Bears

Special teams

- Placekicker: Mike Vanderjagt, Indianapolis Colts
- Punter: Brad Costello, Cincinnati Bengals
- Kickoff returner: Terry Fair, Detroit Lions
- Punt returner: Jacquez Green, Tampa Bay Buccaneers
- Special teams: Tim Dwight, Atlanta Falcons

== 1999 ==
Offense

- Quarterback: Tim Couch, Cleveland Browns
- Running back: Olandis Gary, Denver Broncos
- Running back: Edgerrin James, Indianapolis Colts
- Wide receiver: Torry Holt, St. Louis Rams
- Wide receiver: Kevin Johnson, Cleveland Browns
- Tight end: Jed Weaver, Philadelphia Eagles
- Center: Damien Woody, New England Patriots
- Guard: Doug Brzezinski, Philadelphia Eagles
- Guard: Randy Thomas, New York Jets
- Tackle: Jon Jansen, Washington Redskins
- Tackle: Chris Terry, Carolina Panthers

Defense

- Defensive end: Russell Davis, Chicago Bears
- Defensive end: Ebenezer Ekuban, Dallas Cowboys
- Defensive end: Jevon Kearse, Tennessee Titans
- Defensive tackle: Jason Wiltz, New York Jets
- Linebacker: Chris Claiborne, Detroit Lions
- Linebacker: Andy Katzenmoyer, New England Patriots
- Linebacker: Mike Peterson, Indianapolis Colts
- Cornerback: Champ Bailey, Washington Redskins
- Cornerback: Fernando Bryant, Jacksonville Jaguars
- Safety: Cory Hall, Cincinnati Bengals
- Safety: Jason Perry, San Diego Chargers

Special teams

- Placekicker: Martín Gramática, Tampa Bay Buccaneers
- Punter: Hunter Smith, Indianapolis Colts
- Kickoff returner: Terrence Wilkins, Indianapolis Colts
- Punt returner: Charlie Rogers, Seattle Seahawks
- Special teams: John McLaughlin, Tampa Bay Buccaneers

== 2000 ==
Offense

- Quarterback: Doug Johnson, Atlanta Falcons
- Running back: Mike Anderson, Denver Broncos
- Running back: Jamal Lewis, Baltimore Ravens
- Wide receiver: Darrell Jackson, Seattle Seahawks
- Wide receiver: Sylvester Morris, Kansas City Chiefs
- Tight end: Anthony Becht, New York Jets
- Center: J. P. Darche, Seattle Seahawks
- Guard: Jeno James, Carolina Panthers
- Guard: Brad Meester, Jacksonville Jaguars
- Tackle: Chris Samuels, Washington Redskins
- Tackle: Todd Wade, Miami Dolphins

Defense

- Defensive line: Courtney Brown, Cleveland Browns
- Defensive line: Chris Hovan, Minnesota Vikings
- Defensive line: Darren Howard, New Orleans Saints
- Defensive line: Corey Simon, Philadelphia Eagles
- Linebacker: LaVar Arrington, Washington Redskins
- Linebacker: Na'il Diggs, Green Bay Packers
- Linebacker: Brian Urlacher, Chicago Bears
- Cornerback: Pat Dennis, Kansas City Chiefs
- Cornerback: Ahmed Plummer, San Francisco 49ers
- Safety: Mike Brown, Chicago Bears
- Safety: Greg Wesley, Kansas City Chiefs

Special teams

- Placekicker: Paul Edinger, Chicago Bears
- Punter: Shane Lechler, Oakland Raiders
- Kickoff returner: Darrick Vaughn, Atlanta Falcons
- Punt returner: Hank Poteat, Pittsburgh Steelers
- Special teams: J. P. Darche, Seattle Seahawks

== 2001 ==
Offense

- Quarterback: Chris Weinke, Carolina Panthers
- Running back: Anthony Thomas, Chicago Bears
- Running back: LaDainian Tomlinson, San Diego Chargers
- Wide receiver: Chris Chambers, Miami Dolphins
- Wide receiver: Rod Gardner, Washington Redskins
- Tight end: Eric Johnson, San Francisco 49ers
- Center: Dominic Raiola, Detroit Lions
- Guard: Leonard Williams, Arizona Cardinals
- Guard: Steve Hutchinson, Seattle Seahawks
- Tackle: Jeff Backus, Detroit Lions
- Tackle: Kenyatta Walker, Tampa Bay Buccaneers

Defense

- Defensive end: Richard Seymour, New England Patriots
- Defensive end: Justin Smith, Cincinnati Bengals
- Defensive tackle: Shaun Rogers, Detroit Lions
- Defensive tackle: Gerard Warren, Cleveland Browns
- Linebacker: Kendrell Bell, Pittsburgh Steelers
- Linebacker: Dan Morgan, Carolina Panthers
- Linebacker: Tommy Polley, St. Louis Rams
- Cornerback: Anthony Henry, Cleveland Browns
- Cornerback: Fred Smoot, Washington Redskins
- Safety: Adam Archuleta, St. Louis Rams
- Safety: Idrees Bashir, Indianapolis Colts

Special teams

- Placekicker: Jay Feely, Atlanta Falcons
- Punter: Jason Baker, San Francisco 49ers
- Kickoff returner: Steve Smith Sr., Carolina Panthers
- Punt returner: Steve Smith Sr., Carolina Panthers
- Special teams: Jamie Winborn, San Francisco 49ers

== 2002 ==
Offense

- Quarterback: David Carr, Houston Texans
- Running back: William Green, Cleveland Browns
- Running back: Clinton Portis, Denver Broncos
- Wide receiver: Antonio Bryant, Dallas Cowboys
- Wide receiver: Donté Stallworth, New Orleans Saints
- Tight end: Jeremy Shockey, New York Giants
- Center: Jason Ball, San Diego Chargers
- Guard: LeCharles Bentley, New Orleans Saints
- Guard: Kendall Simmons, Pittsburgh Steelers
- Tackle: Levi Jones, Cincinnati Bengals
- Tackle: Mike Williams, Buffalo Bills

Defense

- Defensive line: Dwight Freeney, Indianapolis Colts
- Defensive line: Carlos Hall, Tennessee Titans
- Defensive line: John Henderson, Jacksonville Jaguars
- Defensive line: Julius Peppers, Carolina Panthers
- Linebacker: Scott Fujita, Kansas City Chiefs
- Linebacker: Napoleon Harris, Oakland Raiders
- Linebacker: Ben Leber, San Diego Chargers
- Cornerback: Quentin Jammer, San Diego Chargers
- Cornerback: Derek Ross, Dallas Cowboys
- Safety: Ed Reed, Baltimore Ravens
- Safety: Roy Williams, Dallas Cowboys

Special teams

- Placekicker: Matt Bryant, New York Giants
- Punter: Dave Zastudil, Baltimore Ravens
- Kickoff returner: André Davis, Cleveland Browns
- Punt returner: Antwaan Randle El, Pittsburgh Steelers
- Special teams: Michael Lewis, Philadelphia Eagles

== 2003 ==
Offense

- Quarterback: Byron Leftwich, Jacksonville Jaguars
- Running back: Domanick Davis, Houston Texans
- Running back: Onterrio Smith, Minnesota Vikings
- Wide receiver: Anquan Boldin, Arizona Cardinals
- Wide receiver: Andre Johnson, Houston Texans
- Tight end: Jason Witten, Dallas Cowboys
- Center: Dan Koppen, New England Patriots
- Guard: Vince Manuwai, Jacksonville Jaguars
- Guard: Eric Steinbach, Cincinnati Bengals
- Tackle: Jordan Gross, Carolina Panthers
- Tackle: Wade Smith, Miami Dolphins

Defense

- Defensive end: Tyler Brayton, Oakland Raiders
- Defensive end: Kevin Williams, Minnesota Vikings
- Defensive tackle: Johnathan Sullivan, New Orleans Saints
- Defensive tackle: Dewayne Robertson, New York Jets
- Outside linebacker: Terrell Suggs, Baltimore Ravens
- Outside linebacker: Pisa Tinoisamoa, St. Louis Rams
- Middle linebacker: Nick Barnett, Green Bay Packers
- Cornerback: Terence Newman, Dallas Cowboys
- Cornerback: Marcus Trufant, Seattle Seahawks
- Safety: Ken Hamlin, Seattle Seahawks
- Safety: Eugene Wilson, New England Patriots

Special teams

- Placekicker: Josh Brown, Seattle Seahawks
- Punter: Eddie Johnson, Minnesota Vikings
- Kickoff returner: Bethel Johnson, New England Patriots
- Punt returner: Zuriel Smith, Dallas Cowboys
- Special teams: David Tyree, New York Giants

== 2004 ==
Offense

- Quarterback: Ben Roethlisberger, Pittsburgh Steelers
- Running back: Kevin Jones, Detroit Lions
- Running back: Julius Jones, Dallas Cowboys
- Wide receiver: Michael Clayton, Tampa Bay Buccaneers
- Wide receiver: Roy Williams, Detroit Lions
- Tight end: Chris Cooley, Washington Redskins
- Center: Alex Stepanovich, Arizona Cardinals
- Guard: Jacob Bell, Tennessee Titans
- Guard: Chris Snee, New York Giants
- Tackle: Robert Gallery, Oakland Raiders
- Tackle: Shane Olivea, San Diego Chargers

Defense

- Defensive end: Jared Allen, Kansas City Chiefs
- Defensive end: Will Smith, New Orleans Saints
- Defensive tackle: Darnell Dockett, Arizona Cardinals
- Defensive tackle: Tommie Harris, Chicago Bears
- Outside linebacker: Karlos Dansby, Arizona Cardinals
- Outside linebacker: D. J. Williams, Denver Broncos
- Middle linebacker: Jonathan Vilma, New York Jets
- Cornerback: Chris Gamble, Carolina Panthers
- Cornerback: Dunta Robinson, Houston Texans
- Safety: Michael Boulware, Seattle Seahawks
- Safety: Sean Taylor, Washington Redskins

Special teams

- Placekicker: Nate Kaeding, San Diego Chargers
- Punter: Kyle Larson, Cincinnati Bengals
- Kickoff returner: Wes Welker, Miami Dolphins
- Punt returner: B. J. Sams, Baltimore Ravens
- Special teams: Keith Lewis, San Francisco 49ers

== 2005 ==
Offense

- Quarterback: Kyle Orton, Chicago Bears
- Running back: Ronnie Brown, Miami Dolphins
- Running back: Cadillac Williams, Tampa Bay Buccaneers
- Wide receiver: Mark Clayton, Baltimore Ravens
- Wide receiver: Chris Henry, Cincinnati Bengals
- Tight end: Heath Miller, Pittsburgh Steelers
- Center: Chris Spencer, Seattle Seahawks
- Guard: Dan Buenning, Tampa Bay Buccaneers
- Guard: Logan Mankins, New England Patriots
- Tackle: Jammal Brown, New Orleans Saints
- Tackle: Khalif Barnes, Jacksonville Jaguars

Defense

- Defensive line: Luis Castillo, San Diego Chargers
- Defensive line: Trent Cole, Philadelphia Eagles
- Defensive line: Mike Patterson, Philadelphia Eagles
- Defensive line: Marcus Spears, Dallas Cowboys
- Linebacker: Shawne Merriman, San Diego Chargers
- Linebacker: Lofa Tatupu, Seattle Seahawks
- Linebacker: Odell Thurman, Cincinnati Bengals
- Cornerback: Ellis Hobbs, New England Patriots
- Cornerback: Darrent Williams, Denver Broncos
- Safety: Nick Collins, Green Bay Packers
- Safety: Kerry Rhodes, New York Jets

Special teams

- Placekicker: Mike Nugent, New York Jets
- Punter: Chris Kluwe, Minnesota Vikings
- Kickoff returner: Jerome Mathis, Houston Texans
- Punt returner: Adam Jones, Tennessee Titans
- Special teams: Michael Boley, Atlanta Falcons

== 2006 ==
Offense

- Quarterback: Vince Young, Tennessee Titans
- Running back: Reggie Bush, New Orleans Saints
- Running back: Maurice Jones-Drew, Jacksonville Jaguars
- Wide receiver: Marques Colston, New Orleans Saints
- Wide receiver: Greg Jennings, Green Bay Packers
- Tight end: Owen Daniels, Houston Texans
- Center: Nick Mangold, New York Jets
- Guard: Daryn Colledge, Green Bay Packers
- Guard: Jahri Evans, New Orleans Saints
- Tackle: D’Brickashaw Ferguson, New York Jets
- Tackle: Marcus McNeill, San Diego Chargers

Defense

- Defensive end: Mark Anderson, Chicago Bears
- Defensive end: Barry Cofield, New York Giants
- Defensive tackle: Tamba Hali, Kansas City Chiefs
- Defensive tackle: Haloti Ngata, Baltimore Ravens
- Linebacker: A. J. Hawk, Green Bay Packers
- Linebacker: DeMeco Ryans, Houston Texans
- Middle linebacker: Ernie Sims, Detroit Lions
- Cornerback: Tye Hill, St. Louis Rams
- Cornerback: Richard Marshall, Carolina Panthers
- Safety: Dawan Landry, Baltimore Ravens
- Safety: Donte Whitner, Buffalo Bills

Special teams

- Placekicker: Stephen Gostkowski, New England Patriots
- Punter: Ryan Plackemeier, Seattle Seahawks
- Kickoff returner: Devin Hester, Chicago Bears
- Punt returner: Devin Hester, Chicago Bears
- Special teams: Bernard Pollard, Kansas City Chiefs

== 2007 ==
Offense

- Quarterback: Trent Edwards, Buffalo Bills
- Running back: Adrian Peterson, Minnesota Vikings
- Running back: Marshawn Lynch, Buffalo Bills
- Wide receiver: Calvin Johnson, Detroit Lions
- Wide receiver: Dwayne Bowe, Kansas City Chiefs
- Tight end: Greg Olsen, Chicago Bears
- Center: Samson Satele, Miami Dolphins
- Guard: Ben Grubbs, Baltimore Ravens
- Guard: Arron Sears, Tampa Bay Buccaneers
- Tackle: Joe Thomas, Cleveland Browns
- Tackle: Tony Ugoh, Indianapolis Colts

Defense

- Defensive end: Gaines Adams, Tampa Bay Buccaneers
- Defensive end: Brian Robison, Minnesota Vikings
- Defensive tackle: Ed Johnson, Indianapolis Colts
- Defensive tackle: Amobi Okoye, Houston Texans
- Linebacker: David Harris, New York Jets
- Linebacker: Jon Beason, Carolina Panthers
- Middle linebacker: Patrick Willis, San Francisco 49ers
- Cornerback: Darrelle Revis, New York Jets
- Cornerback: Leon Hall, Cincinnati Bengals
- Safety: LaRon Landry, Washington Redskins
- Safety: Reggie Nelson, Jacksonville Jaguars

Special teams

- Placekicker: Nick Folk, Dallas Cowboys
- Punter: Daniel Sepulveda, Pittsburgh Steelers
- Kickoff returner: Yamon Figurs, Baltimore Ravens
- Punt returner: Ted Ginn Jr., Miami Dolphins
- Special teams: Brandon Siler, San Diego Chargers

== 2008 ==
Offense

- Quarterback: Matt Ryan, Atlanta Falcons
- Running back: Chris Johnson, Tennessee Titans
- Running back: Matt Forte, Chicago Bears
- Wide receiver: DeSean Jackson, Philadelphia Eagles
- Wide receiver: Eddie Royal, Denver Broncos
- Tight end: John Carlson, Seattle Seahawks
- Center: Jamey Richard, Indianapolis Colts
- Guard: Carl Nicks, New Orleans Saints
- Guard: Mike Pollak, Indianapolis Colts
- Tackle: Ryan Clady, Denver Broncos
- Tackle: Jake Long, Miami Dolphins

Defense

- Defensive line: Sedrick Ellis, New Orleans Saints
- Defensive line: Jason Jones, Tennessee Titans
- Defensive line: Kendall Langford, Miami Dolphins
- Defensive line: Chris Long, St. Louis Rams
- Linebacker: Jerod Mayo, New England Patriots
- Linebacker: Xavier Adibi, Houston Texans
- Linebacker: Curtis Lofton, Atlanta Falcons
- Cornerback: Dominique Rodgers-Cromartie, Arizona Cardinals
- Cornerback: Brandon Flowers, Kansas City Chiefs
- Safety: Chris Horton, Washington Redskins
- Safety: Kenny Phillips, New York Giants

Special teams

- Placekicker: Dan Carpenter, Miami Dolphins
- Punter: Brett Kern, Denver Broncos
- Kickoff returner: Leodis McKelvin, Buffalo Bills
- Punt returner: Clifton Smith, Tampa Bay Buccaneers
- Special teams: none

== 2009 ==
Offense

- Quarterback: Mark Sanchez, New York Jets
- Running back: Knowshon Moreno, Denver Broncos
- Running back: Beanie Wells, Arizona Cardinals
- Wide receiver: Austin Collie, Indianapolis Colts
- Wide receiver: Percy Harvin, Minnesota Vikings
- Tight end: Brandon Pettigrew, Detroit Lions
- Center: Alex Mack, Cleveland Browns
- Guard: Louis Vasquez, San Diego Chargers
- Guard: Andy Levitre, Buffalo Bills
- Tackle: Phil Loadholt, Minnesota Vikings
- Tackle: Michael Oher, Baltimore Ravens

Defense

- Defensive line: Tyson Jackson, Kansas City Chiefs
- Defensive line: Terrance Knighton, Jacksonville Jaguars
- Defensive line: B. J. Raji, Green Bay Packers
- Defensive line: Matt Shaughnessy, Oakland Raiders
- Linebacker: Brian Cushing, Houston Texans
- Linebacker: Clay Matthews III, Green Bay Packers
- Linebacker: Brian Orakpo, Washington Redskins
- Cornerback: Jacob Lacey, Indianapolis Colts
- Cornerback: Vontae Davis, Miami Dolphins
- Safety: Jarius Byrd, Buffalo Bills
- Safety: Louis Delmas, Detroit Lions

Special teams

- Placekicker: Ryan Succop, Kansas City Chiefs
- Punter: Pat McAfee, Indianapolis Colts
- Kickoff returner: Percy Harvin, Minnesota Vikings
- Punt returner: Quan Cosby, Cincinnati Bengals
- Special teams: LaRod Stephens-Howling, Arizona Cardinals

== 2010 ==
Offense

- Quarterback: Sam Bradford, St. Louis Rams
- Running back: LeGarrette Blount, Tampa Bay Buccaneers
- Running back: Chris Ivory, New Orleans Saints
- Wide receiver: Dez Bryant, Dallas Cowboys
- Wide receiver: Mike Williams, Tampa Bay Buccaneers
- Tight end: Rob Gronkowski, New England Patriots
- Center: Maurkice Pouncey, Pittsburgh Steelers
- Guard: Mike Iupati, San Francisco 49ers
- Guard: John Jerry, Miami Dolphins
- Tackle: Bryan Bulaga, Green Bay Packers
- Tackle: Rodger Saffold, St. Louis Rams

Defense

- Defensive line: Tyson Alualu, Jacksonville Jaguars
- Defensive line: Carlos Dunlap, Cincinnati Bengals
- Defensive line: Lamarr Houston, Oakland Raiders
- Defensive line: Ndamukong Suh, Detroit Lions
- Linebacker: Pat Angerer, Indianapolis Colts
- Linebacker: Rolando McClain, Oakland Raiders
- Linebacker: Koa Misi, Miami Dolphins
- Cornerback: Joe Haden, Cleveland Browns
- Cornerback: Devin McCourty, New England Patriots
- Safety: Eric Berry, Kansas City Chiefs
- Safety: T. J. Ward, Cleveland Browns

Special teams

- Placekicker: Clint Stitser, Cincinnati Bengals
- Punter: Zoltan Mesko, New England Patriots
- Kickoff returner: Jacoby Ford, Oakland Raiders
- Punt returner: Marc Mariani, Tennessee Titans
- Special teams: T. J. Ward, Cleveland Browns

== 2011 ==
Offense

- Quarterback: Cam Newton, Carolina Panthers
- Running back: Roy Helu, Washington Redskins
- Running back: DeMarco Murray, Dallas Cowboys
- Wide receiver: A. J. Green, Cincinnati Bengals
- Wide receiver: Julio Jones, Atlanta Falcons
- Tight end: Kyle Rudolph, Minnesota Vikings
- Center: Mike Pouncey, Miami Dolphins
- Guard: Danny Watkins, Philadelphia Eagles
- Guard: Stefen Wisniewski, Oakland Raiders
- Tackle: Tyron Smith, Dallas Cowboys
- Tackle: Nate Solder, New England Patriots

Defense

- Defensive line: Jabaal Sheard, Cleveland Browns
- Defensive line: J. J. Watt, Houston Texans
- Defensive line: Marcell Dareus, Buffalo Bills
- Defensive line: Phil Taylor, Cleveland Browns
- Linebacker: Ryan Kerrigan, Washington Redskins
- Linebacker: Von Miller, Denver Broncos
- Linebacker: Aldon Smith, San Francisco 49ers
- Cornerback: Patrick Peterson, Arizona Cardinals
- Cornerback: Richard Sherman, Seattle Seahawks
- Safety: Chris Conte, Chicago Bears
- Safety: Chris Harris Jr., Denver Broncos

Special teams

- Placekicker: Dan Bailey, Dallas Cowboys
- Punter: Matt Bosher, Atlanta Falcons
- Kickoff returner: Randall Cobb, Green Bay Packers
- Punt returner: Patrick Peterson, Arizona Cardinals
- Special teams: Akeem Dent, Atlanta Falcons

== 2012 ==
Offense

- Quarterback: Robert Griffin III, Washington Redskins
- Running back: Alfred Morris, Washington Redskins
- Running back: Doug Martin, Tampa Bay Buccaneers
- Wide receiver: Justin Blackmon, Jacksonville Jaguars
- Wide receiver: T. Y. Hilton, Indianapolis Colts
- Tight end: Dwayne Allen, Indianapolis Colts
- Center: none
- Guard: Amini Silatolu, Carolina Panthers
- Guard: Kevin Zeitler, Cincinnati Bengals
- Tackle: Matt Kalil, Minnesota Vikings
- Tackle: Mitchell Schwartz, Cleveland Browns

Defense

- Defensive line: Michael Brockers, St. Louis Rams
- Defensive line: Fletcher Cox, Philadelphia Eagles
- Defensive line: Chandler Jones, New England Patriots
- Defensive line: Bruce Irvin, Seattle Seahawks
- Linebacker: Lavonte David, Tampa Bay Buccaneers
- Linebacker: Luke Kuechly, Carolina Panthers
- Linebacker: Bobby Wagner, Seattle Seahawks
- Cornerback: Casey Hayward, Green Bay Packers
- Cornerback: Janoris Jenkins, St. Louis Rams
- Safety: Mark Barron, Tampa Bay Buccaneers
- Safety: Harrison Smith, Minnesota Vikings

Special teams

- Placekicker: Blair Walsh, Minnesota Vikings
- Punter: Bryan Anger, Jacksonville Jaguars
- Kickoff returner: David Wilson, New York Giants
- Punt returner: T. Y. Hilton, Indianapolis Colts
- Special teams: Johnson Bademosi, Cleveland Browns

== 2013 ==
Offense

- Quarterback: Mike Glennon, Tampa Bay Buccaneers
- Running back: Giovani Bernard, Cincinnati Bengals
- Running back: Eddie Lacy, Green Bay Packers
- Wide receiver: Keenan Allen, San Diego Chargers
- Wide receiver: DeAndre Hopkins, Houston Texans
- Tight end: Jordan Reed, Washington Redskins
- Center: Travis Frederick, Dallas Cowboys
- Guard: Kyle Long, Chicago Bears
- Guard: Larry Warford, Detroit Lions
- Tackle: D. J. Fluker, San Diego Chargers
- Tackle: Justin Pugh, New York Giants

Defense

- Defensive line: Ezekiel Ansah, Detroit Lions
- Defensive line: Star Lotulelei, Carolina Panthers
- Defensive line: Sheldon Richardson, New York Jets
- Defensive line: Kawann Short, Carolina Panthers
- Linebacker: Kiko Alonso, Buffalo Bills
- Linebacker: Sio Moore, Oakland Raiders
- Linebacker: Alec Ogletree, St. Louis Rams
- Cornerback: Tyrann Mathieu, Arizona Cardinals
- Cornerback: Desmond Trufant, Atlanta Falcons
- Safety: Eric Reid, San Francisco 49ers
- Safety: Kenny Vaccaro, New Orleans Saints

Special teams

- Placekicker: Caleb Sturgis, Miami Dolphins
- Punter: Sam Martin, Detroit Lions
- Kickoff returner: Cordarrelle Patterson, Minnesota Vikings
- Punt returner: Tavon Austin, St. Louis Rams
- Special teams: Don Jones, Miami Dolphins

== 2014 ==
Offense

- Quarterback: Teddy Bridgewater, Minnesota Vikings
- Running back: Jeremy Hill, Cincinnati Bengals
- Running back: Tre Mason, St. Louis Rams
- Wide receiver: Odell Beckham Jr., New York Giants
- Wide receiver: Mike Evans, Tampa Bay Buccaneers
- Tight end: Jace Amaro, New York Jets
- Center: Corey Linsley, Green Bay Packers
- Guard: Joel Bitonio, Cleveland Browns
- Guard: Zack Martin, Dallas Cowboys
- Tackle: Taylor Lewan, Tennessee Titans
- Tackle: Ja'Wuan James, Miami Dolphins

Defense

- Defensive line: Aaron Donald, St. Louis Rams
- Defensive line: Timmy Jernigan, Baltimore Ravens
- Defensive line: Kony Ealy, Carolina Panthers
- Defensive line: Justin Ellis, Oakland Raiders
- Linebacker: Chris Borland, San Francisco 49ers
- Linebacker: Khalil Mack, Oakland Raiders
- Linebacker: C. J. Mosley, Baltimore Ravens
- Cornerback: Kyle Fuller, Chicago Bears
- Cornerback: E. J. Gaines, St. Louis Rams
- Safety: Deone Bucannon, Arizona Cardinals
- Safety: Ha Ha Clinton-Dix, Green Bay Packers

Special teams

- Placekicker: Cody Parkey, Philadelphia Eagles
- Punter: Pat O'Donnell, Chicago Bears
- Kickoff returner: Jarvis Landry, Miami Dolphins
- Punt returner: De'Anthony Thomas, Kansas City Chiefs
- Special teams: Trey Burton, Philadelphia Eagles

== 2015 ==
Offense

- Quarterback: Jameis Winston, Tampa Bay Buccaneers
- Running back: Todd Gurley, St. Louis Rams
- Running back: Thomas Rawls, Seattle Seahawks
- Wide receiver: Amari Cooper, Oakland Raiders
- Wide receiver: Stefon Diggs, Minnesota Vikings
- Tight end: Will Tye, New York Giants
- Center: Mitch Morse, Kansas City Chiefs
- Guard: Ali Marpet, Tampa Bay Buccaneers
- Guard: Brandon Scherff, Washington Redskins
- Tackle: Rob Havenstein, St. Louis Rams
- Tackle: Donovan Smith, Tampa Bay Buccaneers

Defense

- Defensive line: Malcom Brown, New England Patriots
- Defensive line: Eddie Goldman, Chicago Bears
- Defensive line: Danielle Hunter, Minnesota Vikings
- Defensive line: Leonard Williams, New York Jets
- Linebacker: Kwon Alexander, Tampa Bay Buccaneers
- Linebacker: Stephone Anthony, New Orleans Saints
- Linebacker: Eric Kendricks, Minnesota Vikings
- Cornerback: Ronald Darby, Buffalo Bills
- Cornerback: Marcus Peters, Kansas City Chiefs
- Safety: Adrian Amos, Chicago Bears
- Safety: Landon Collins, New York Giants

Special teams

- Placekicker: Josh Lambo, San Diego Chargers
- Punter: Matt Darr, Miami Dolphins
- Kickoff returner: Tyler Lockett, Seattle Seahawks
- Punt returner: Tyler Lockett, Seattle Seahawks
- Special teams: Tyler Lockett, Seattle Seahawks

== 2016 ==
Offense

- Quarterback: Dak Prescott, Dallas Cowboys
- Running back: Ezekiel Elliott, Dallas Cowboys
- Running back: Jordan Howard, Chicago Bears
- Wide receiver: Sterling Shepard, New York Giants
- Wide receiver: Michael Thomas, New Orleans Saints
- Tight end: Hunter Henry, San Diego Chargers
- Center: Cody Whitehair, Chicago Bears
- Guard: Joe Thuney, New England Patriots
- Guard: Laremy Tunsil, Miami Dolphins
- Tackle: Jack Conklin, Tennessee Titans
- Tackle: Taylor Decker, Detroit Lions

Defense

- Defensive line: Joey Bosa, San Diego Chargers
- Defensive line: DeForest Buckner, San Francisco 49ers
- Defensive line: Chris Jones, Kansas City Chiefs
- Defensive line: Yannick Ngakoue, Jacksonville Jaguars
- Linebacker: Jatavis Brown, San Diego Chargers
- Linebacker: Leonard Floyd, Chicago Bears
- Linebacker: Deion Jones, Atlanta Falcons
- Cornerback: Vernon Hargreaves, Tampa Bay Buccaneers
- Cornerback: Jalen Ramsey, Jacksonville Jaguars
- Safety: Karl Joseph, Oakland Raiders
- Safety: Keanu Neal, Atlanta Falcons

Special teams

- Placekicker: Wil Lutz, New Orleans Saints
- Punter: Riley Dixon, Denver Broncos
- Kickoff returner: Tyreek Hill, Kansas City Chiefs
- Punt returner: Tyreek Hill, Kansas City Chiefs
- Special teams: Tyreek Hill, Kansas City Chiefs

== 2017 ==
Offense

- Quarterback: Deshaun Watson, Houston Texans
- Running back: Kareem Hunt, Kansas City Chiefs
- Running back: Alvin Kamara, New Orleans Saints
- Wide receiver: Cooper Kupp, Los Angeles Rams
- Wide receiver: JuJu Smith-Schuster, Pittsburgh Steelers
- Tight end: Evan Engram, New York Giants
- Center: Pat Elflein, Minnesota Vikings
- Guard: Dan Feeney, Los Angeles Chargers
- Guard: Jermaine Eluemunor, Baltimore Ravens
- Guard: Ethan Pocic, Seattle Seahawks
- Tackle: Garett Bolles, Denver Broncos
- Tackle: Ryan Ramczyk, New Orleans Saints

Defense

- Defensive line: Derek Barnett, Philadelphia Eagles
- Defensive line: Myles Garrett, Cleveland Browns
- Defensive line: Carl Lawson, Cincinnati Bengals
- Defensive line: Dalvin Tomlinson, New York Giants
- Linebacker: Jarrad Davis, Detroit Lions
- Linebacker: Reuben Foster, San Francisco 49ers
- Linebacker: T. J. Watt, Pittsburgh Steelers
- Cornerback: Marshon Lattimore, New Orleans Saints
- Cornerback: Tre'Davious White, Buffalo Bills
- Safety: Jamal Adams, New York Jets
- Safety: Marcus Williams, New Orleans Saints

Special teams

- Placekicker: Harrison Butker, Kansas City Chiefs
- Punter: Rigoberto Sanchez, Indianapolis Colts
- Kickoff returner: Ryan Switzer, Dallas Cowboys
- Punt returner: Jamal Agnew, Detroit Lions
- Special teams: Budda Baker, Arizona Cardinals

== 2018 ==
Offense

- Quarterback: Baker Mayfield, Cleveland Browns
- Running back: Saquon Barkley, New York Giants
- Running back: Phillip Lindsay, Denver Broncos
- Wide receiver: Calvin Ridley, Atlanta Falcons
- Wide receiver: D. J. Moore, Carolina Panthers
- Tight end: Chris Herndon, New York Jets
- Center: Billy Price, Cincinnati Bengals
- Guard: Will Hernandez, New York Giants
- Guard: Quenton Nelson, Indianapolis Colts
- Tackle: Mike McGlinchey, San Francisco 49ers
- Tackle: Braden Smith, Indianapolis Colts

Defense

- Defensive line: Bradley Chubb, Denver Broncos
- Defensive line: Marcus Davenport, New Orleans Saints
- Defensive line: Da'Shawn Hand, Detroit Lions
- Defensive line: Daron Payne, Washington Redskins
- Linebacker: Shaquille Leonard, Indianapolis Colts
- Linebacker: Roquan Smith, Chicago Bears
- Linebacker: Leighton Vander Esch, Dallas Cowboys
- Cornerback: Jaire Alexander, Green Bay Packers
- Cornerback: Denzel Ward, Cleveland Browns
- Safety: Jessie Bates, Cincinnati Bengals
- Safety: Derwin James, Los Angeles Chargers

Special teams

- Placekicker: Jason Sanders, Miami Dolphins
- Punter: Michael Dickson, Seattle Seahawks
- Kickoff returner: Tremon Smith, Kansas City Chiefs
- Punt returner: Christian Kirk, Arizona Cardinals
- Special teams: Ezekiel Turner, Arizona Cardinals

== 2019 ==
Offense

- Quarterback: Kyler Murray, Arizona Cardinals
- Running back: Josh Jacobs, Oakland Raiders
- Running back: Miles Sanders, Philadelphia Eagles
- Wide receiver: A. J. Brown, Tennessee Titans
- Wide receiver: Terry McLaurin, Washington Redskins
- Tight end: Noah Fant, Denver Broncos
- Center: Erik McCoy, New Orleans Saints
- Guard: Elgton Jenkins, Green Bay Packers
- Guard: Dalton Risner, Denver Broncos
- Tackle: Tytus Howard, Houston Texans
- Tackle: Jawaan Taylor, Jacksonville Jaguars

Defense

- Defensive line: Josh Allen, Jacksonville Jaguars
- Defensive line: Nick Bosa, San Francisco 49ers
- Defensive line: Dexter Lawrence, New York Giants
- Defensive line: Ed Oliver, Buffalo Bills
- Linebacker: Devin Bush Jr., Pittsburgh Steelers
- Linebacker: Devin White, Tampa Bay Buccaneers
- Linebacker: Dre Greenlaw, San Francisco 49ers
- Cornerback: Chauncey Gardner-Johnson, New Orleans Saints
- Cornerback: Sean Murphy-Bunting, Tampa Bay Buccaneers
- Safety: Darnell Savage, Green Bay Packers
- Safety: Juan Thornhill, Kansas City Chiefs

Special teams

- Placekicker: Austin Seibert, Cleveland Browns
- Punter: Jamie Gillan, Cleveland Browns
- Kickoff returner: Mecole Hardman, Kansas City Chiefs
- Punt returner: Deonte Harris, New Orleans Saints
- Special teams: Drue Tranquill, Los Angeles Chargers

== 2020 ==
Offense

- Quarterback: Justin Herbert, Los Angeles Chargers
- Running back: James Robinson, Jacksonville Jaguars
- Running back: Jonathan Taylor, Indianapolis Colts
- Wide receiver: Chase Claypool, Pittsburgh Steelers
- Wide receiver: Justin Jefferson, Minnesota Vikings
- Tight end: Harrison Bryant, Cleveland Browns
- Center: Lloyd Cushenberry, Denver Broncos
- Guard: Damien Lewis, Seattle Seahawks
- Guard: Michael Onwenu, New England Patriots
- Tackle: Jedrick Wills, Cleveland Browns
- Tackle: Tristan Wirfs, Tampa Bay Buccaneers

Defense

- Defensive line: Derrick Brown, Carolina Panthers
- Defensive line: Raekwon Davis, Miami Dolphins
- Defensive line: Javon Kinlaw, San Francisco 49ers
- Defensive line: Chase Young, Washington Football Team
- Linebacker: Kenneth Murray, Los Angeles Chargers
- Linebacker: Patrick Queen, Baltimore Ravens
- Linebacker: Isaiah Simmons, Arizona Cardinals
- Cornerback: Cameron Dantzler, Minnesota Vikings
- Cornerback: L'Jarius Sneed, Kansas City Chiefs
- Safety: Jeremy Chinn, Carolina Panthers
- Safety: Antoine Winfield Jr., Tampa Bay Buccaneers

Special teams

- Placekicker: Rodrigo Blankenship, Indianapolis Colts
- Punter: Tommy Townsend, Kansas City Chiefs
- Kickoff returner: Isaiah Rodgers, Indianapolis Colts
- Punt returner: James Proche, Baltimore Ravens
- Special teams: Jordan Glasgow, Indianapolis Colts

== 2021 ==
Offense

- Quarterback: Mac Jones, New England Patriots
- Running back: Najee Harris, Pittsburgh Steelers
- Running back: Javonte Williams, Denver Broncos
- Wide receiver: Ja'Marr Chase, Cincinnati Bengals
- Wide receiver: Jaylen Waddle, Miami Dolphins
- Tight end: Kyle Pitts, Atlanta Falcons
- Center: Creed Humphrey, Kansas City Chiefs
- Guard: Trey Smith, Kansas City Chiefs
- Guard: Alijah Vera-Tucker, New York Jets
- Tackle: Rashawn Slater, Los Angeles Chargers
- Tackle: Penei Sewell, Detroit Lions

Defense

- Defensive line: Christian Barmore, New England Patriots
- Defensive line: Odafe Oweh, Baltimore Ravens
- Defensive line: Kwity Paye, Indianapolis Colts
- Defensive line: Jaelan Phillips, Miami Dolphins
- Linebacker: Nick Bolton, Kansas City Chiefs
- Linebacker: Jeremiah Owusu-Koramoah, Cleveland Browns
- Linebacker: Micah Parsons, Dallas Cowboys
- Cornerback: Greg Newsome II, Cleveland Browns
- Cornerback: Patrick Surtain II, Denver Broncos
- Safety: Jevon Holland, Miami Dolphins
- Safety: Trevon Moehrig, Las Vegas Raiders

Special teams

- Placekicker: Evan McPherson, Cincinnati Bengals
- Punter: Pressley Harvin III, Pittsburgh Steelers
- Kickoff returner: Kene Nwangwu, Minnesota Vikings
- Punt returner: Demetric Felton, Cleveland Browns
- Special teams: Nick Niemann, Los Angeles Chargers

== 2022 ==
Offense

- Quarterback: Brock Purdy, San Francisco 49ers
- Running back: Tyler Allgeier, Atlanta Falcons
- Running back: Kenneth Walker III, Seattle Seahawks
- Wide receiver: Chris Olave, New Orleans Saints
- Wide receiver: Garrett Wilson, New York Jets
- Tight end: Chig Okonkwo, Tennessee Titans
- Center: Tyler Linderbaum, Baltimore Ravens
- Guard: Zion Johnson, Los Angeles Chargers
- Guard: Dylan Parham, Las Vegas Raiders
- Tackle: Braxton Jones, Chicago Bears
- Tackle: Tyler Smith, Dallas Cowboys

Defense

- Defensive line: Jordan Davis, Philadelphia Eagles
- Defensive line: Aidan Hutchinson, Detroit Lions
- Defensive line: George Karlaftis, Kansas City Chiefs
- Defensive line: Kayvon Thibodeaux, New York Giants
- Linebacker: Devin Lloyd, Jacksonville Jaguars
- Linebacker: Malcolm Rodriguez, Detroit Lions
- Linebacker: Quay Walker, Green Bay Packers
- Cornerback: Sauce Gardner, New York Jets
- Cornerback: Tariq Woolen, Seattle Seahawks
- Safety: Kyle Hamilton, Baltimore Ravens
- Safety: Jalen Pitre, Houston Texans

Special teams

- Placekicker: Cameron Dicker, Los Angeles Chargers
- Punter: Ryan Stonehouse, Tennessee Titans
- Kickoff returner: Dallis Flowers, Indianapolis Colts
- Punt returner: Marcus Jones, New England Patriots
- Special teams: Brenden Schooler, New England Patriots

== 2023 ==
Offense

- Quarterback: C. J. Stroud, Houston Texans
- Running back: Jahmyr Gibbs, Detroit Lions
- Running back: Bijan Robinson, Atlanta Falcons
- Wide receiver: Jordan Addison, Minnesota Vikings
- Wide receiver: Puka Nacua, Los Angeles Rams
- Tight end: Sam LaPorta, Detroit Lions
- Center: Joe Tippmann, New York Jets
- Guard: Steve Avila, Los Angeles Rams
- Guard: O'Cyrus Torrence, Buffalo Bills
- Tackle: Dawand Jones, Cleveland Browns
- Tackle: Darnell Wright, Chicago Bears

Defense

- Defensive line: Will Anderson Jr., Houston Texans
- Defensive line: Jalen Carter, Philadelphia Eagles
- Defensive line: Tuli Tuipulotu, Los Angeles Chargers
- Defensive line: Kobie Turner, Los Angeles Rams
- Linebacker: Jack Campbell, Detroit Lions
- Linebacker: Ivan Pace Jr., Minnesota Vikings
- Linebacker: Byron Young, Los Angeles Rams
- Cornerback: Joey Porter Jr., Pittsburgh Steelers
- Cornerback: Devon Witherspoon, Seattle Seahawks
- Safety: Jordan Battle, Cincinnati Bengals
- Safety: Ji'Ayir Brown, San Francisco 49ers

Special teams

- Placekicker: Jake Moody, San Francisco 49ers
- Punter: Bryce Baringer, New England Patriots
- Kickoff returner: Marvin Mims, Denver Broncos
- Punt returner: Derius Davis, Los Angeles Chargers
- Special teams: Jerrick Reed II, Seattle Seahawks

== 2024 ==
Offense

- Quarterback: Jayden Daniels, Washington Commanders
- Running back: Bucky Irving, Tampa Bay Buccaneers
- Running back: Tyrone Tracy Jr., New York Giants
- Wide receiver: Malik Nabers, New York Giants
- Wide receiver: Brian Thomas Jr., Jacksonville Jaguars
- Tight end: Brock Bowers, Las Vegas Raiders
- Center: Zach Frazier, Pittsburgh Steelers
- Guard: Jackson Powers-Johnson, Las Vegas Raiders
- Guard: Dominick Puni, San Francisco 49ers
- Tackle: Joe Alt, Los Angeles Chargers
- Tackle: Roger Rosengarten, Baltimore Ravens

Defense

- Defensive line: Jonah Elliss, Denver Broncos
- Defensive line: Braden Fiske, Los Angeles Rams
- Defensive line: Laiatu Latu, Indianapolis Colts
- Defensive line: T'Vondre Sweat, Tennessee Titans
- Linebacker: Edgerrin Cooper, Green Bay Packers
- Linebacker: Chop Robinson, Miami Dolphins
- Linebacker: Jared Verse, Los Angeles Rams
- Cornerback: Cooper DeJean, Philadelphia Eagles
- Cornerback: Quinyon Mitchell, Philadelphia Eagles
- Safety: Calen Bullock, Houston Texans
- Safety: Evan Williams, Green Bay Packers

Special teams

- Placekicker: Cam Little, Jacksonville Jaguars
- Punter: Ryan Rehkow, Cincinnati Bengals
- Kickoff returner: Jordan Whittington, Los Angeles Rams
- Punt returner: Brandon Codrington, Buffalo Bills
- Special teams: Sione Vaki, Detroit Lions

== 2025 ==
Offense

- Quarterback: Tyler Shough, New Orleans Saints
- Running back: TreVeyon Henderson, New England Patriots
- Running back: Ashton Jeanty, Las Vegas Raiders
- Wide receiver: Emeka Egbuka, Tampa Bay Buccaneers
- Wide receiver: Tetairoa McMillan, Carolina Panthers
- Tight end: Tyler Warren, Indianapolis Colts
- Center: Jonah Monheim, Jacksonville Jaguars
- Guard: Tyler Booker, Dallas Cowboys
- Guard: Grey Zabel, Seattle Seahawks
- Tackle: Kelvin Banks Jr., New Orleans Saints
- Tackle: Armand Membou, New York Jets

Defense

- Defensive line: Abdul Carter, New York Giants
- Defensive line: Mason Graham, Cleveland Browns
- Defensive line: James Pearce Jr., Atlanta Falcons
- Defensive line: Deone Walker, Buffalo Bills
- Linebacker: Teddye Buchanan, Baltimore Ravens
- Linebacker: Jihaad Campbell, Philadelphia Eagles
- Linebacker: Carson Schwesinger, Cleveland Browns
- Cornerback: Will Johnson, Arizona Cardinals
- Cornerback: Jacob Parrish, Tampa Bay Buccaneers
- Safety: Nick Emmanwori, Seattle Seahawks
- Safety: Xavier Watts, Atlanta Falcons

Special teams

- Placekicker: Andrés Borregales, New England Patriots
- Punter: Jeremy Crawshaw, Denver Broncos
- Kickoff returner: Chimere Dike, Tennessee Titans
- Punt returner: Chimere Dike, Tennessee Titans
- Special teams: Carson Bruener, Pittsburgh Steelers

== See also ==
- All-Pro
- NFL Rookie of the Year Award
