= Huey Richardson =

American football player (born 1968)

No. 90, 95
- Positions: Linebacker, defensive end

Personal information
- Born: February 2, 1968 (age 58); Atlanta, Georgia, U.S.
- Listed height: 6 ft 5 in (1.96 m)
- Listed weight: 238 lb (108 kg)

Career information
- High school: Atlanta (GA) Lakeside
- College: Florida
- NFL draft: 1991: 1st round, 15th overall pick

Career history
- Pittsburgh Steelers (1991); Washington Redskins (1992); New York Jets (1992); Miami Dolphins (1993)*
- * Offseason or practice squad member only

Awards and highlights
- First-team All-American (1990); 2× First-team All-SEC (1989, 1990); University of Florida Athletic Hall of Fame

Career NFL statistics
- Games played: 16
- Games started: 0
- Stats at Pro Football Reference

Huey L. Richardson Jr. (born February 2, 1968) is an American former professional football player who was a linebacker and defensive end in the National Football League (NFL) for two seasons during the 1990s. Richardson played college football for the Florida Gators and earned All-American honors. He was a first-round pick in the 1991 NFL draft and played for the Pittsburgh Steelers, Washington Redskins and the New York Jets.

== Early life ==
Richardson was born in Atlanta, Georgia, in 1968. He attended Lakeside High School in Atlanta, and played high school football for the Lakeside Vikings.

== College career ==
Richardson accepted an athletic scholarship to attend the University of Florida in Gainesville, Florida, where he played defensive end for coach Galen Hall and coach Steve Spurrier's Gators teams from 1987 to 1990. Richardson was a first-team All-Southeastern Conference (SEC) selection in 1989 and 1990 and a first-team All-American in 1990, and was selected as a senior team captain. At the end of his four years as a Gator, he totaled 26.5 quarterback sacks and 50.5 tackles for a loss, still third and fourth, respectively, on the Gators' all-time record lists.

Richardson was honored as an SEC Academic Honor Roll selection all four years, received an NCAA post-graduate scholarship, and graduated from Florida with a bachelor's degree in economics in 1990. He was inducted into the University of Florida Athletic Hall of Fame as a "Gator Great" in 2003.

== Professional career ==
Richardson was the first round draft choice (fifteenth pick overall) of the Pittsburgh Steelers in the 1991 NFL draft. Based on a conversation with the former Steelers director of scouting, Max McCartney, with three picks remaining before the Steelers picked at number 15, they had three players targeted that they would be willing to select: Tennessee Volunteers wide receiver Alvin Harper, Colorado Buffaloes wide receiver Mike Pritchard and Arizona State Sun Devils running back Leonard Russell. When those three players were all selected with the three immediately preceding picks (by the Dallas Cowboys, Atlanta Falcons and New England Patriots, respectively), the Pittsburgh draft managers were unprepared and were forced to make a selection before their fifteen-minute time limit expired, and they settled on Richardson.

Richardson played only five games with the Steelers in 1991, registering two tackles, plus another on special teams. Part of the problem was that the Steelers played a 3-4 defense, and Richardson didn't have the build to play defensive end in that scheme. The Steelers made him an inside linebacker, and he didn't make the adjustment very well. Following the 1991 season, long-time head coach Chuck Noll retired and was replaced by Bill Cowher, who tried to switch Richardson to outside linebacker (his position for the first three years of his collegiate career). When that didn't work, Cowher asked player development director Tom Donahoe if it was too soon to cut him. When Donahoe said he should keep the top forty-seven players regardless of their draft history, Richardson was traded to the Washington Redskins for a seventh-round draft pick; if a trade had not been possible, Richardson would have simply been waived. After four uneventful games with the Redskins, he was released and signed with the New York Jets. At the end of the 1992 season, after seven games with the Jets, Richardson's short NFL career was over.

== Life after football ==
Richardson returned to college and earned his master's degree in business administration from Emory University in Atlanta in 2000, and currently works as a financial analyst for Merrill Lynch in New York City. He was in the World Trade Center for a meeting on the morning of the terrorist attacks of September 11, 2001. His meeting was scheduled to take place on an upper floor of the building, but he was delayed in the lobby before boarding the elevator, and was able to leave the World Trade Center safely after the first plane hit the building. He now lives in Mahwah, New Jersey, with his wife and two kids.

== See also ==
- 1990 College Football All-America Team
- Florida Gators football, 1980–89
- Florida Gators football, 1990–99
- List of Florida Gators football All-Americans
- List of Florida Gators in the NFL draft
- List of New York Jets players
- List of Pittsburgh Steelers first-round draft picks
- List of Pittsburgh Steelers players
- List of University of Florida alumni
- List of University of Florida Athletic Hall of Fame members
