= Ed King (American football) =

American football player and coach (born 1969)

No. 68, 64, 61, 57, 79
- Position: Guard

Personal information
- Born: December 3, 1969 (age 56); Fort Benning, Georgia, U.S.
- Listed height: 6 ft 4 in (1.93 m)
- Listed weight: 300 lb (136 kg)

Career information
- High school: Phenix City (AL)
- College: Auburn
- NFL draft: 1991: 2nd round, 29th overall pick

Career history
- Cleveland Browns (1991–1993); Green Bay Packers (1994)*; Barcelona Dragons (1995); New Orleans Saints (1995–1997); Saskatchewan Roughriders (1998); Montreal Alouettes (1999); Birmingham Thunderbolts (2001)
- * Offseason or practice squad member only

Awards and highlights
- PFWA All-Rookie Team (1991); Unanimous All-American (1990); First-team All-American (1989); 2× First-team All-SEC (1989, 1990)

Career NFL statistics
- Games played: 57
- Games started: 47
- Fumble recoveries: 2
- Stats at Pro Football Reference

Edward E'Dainia King (born December 3, 1969) is an American former professional football player who was a guard in the National Football League (NFL). He played college football for the Auburn Tigers. and was selected 29th overall by the Cleveland Browns in the second round of the 1991 NFL draft. He played in the NFL for the Browns and New Orleans Saints.

He has been named a Columbus Lions assistant coach in 2009.
