= Moe Gardner =

American football player (born 1968)

No. 67
- Position: Defensive tackle

Personal information
- Born: August 10, 1968 (age 58); Indianapolis, Indiana, U.S.
- Listed height: 6 ft 2 in (1.88 m)
- Listed weight: 265 lb (120 kg)

Career information
- High school: Cathedral (Indianapolis)
- College: Illinois (1987–1990)
- NFL draft: 1991: 4th round, 87th overall pick

Career history
- Atlanta Falcons (1991–1996)

Awards and highlights
- PFWA All-Rookie Team (1991); Unanimous All-American (1989); Consensus All-American (1990); Big Ten Co-Defensive Player of the Year (1990); Big Ten Defensive Lineman of the Year (1989); 2× First-team All-Big Ten (1989, 1990); Second-team All-Big Ten (1987)

Career NFL statistics
- Total tackles: 446
- Sacks: 10
- Forced fumbles: 1
- Fumble recoveries: 2
- Stats at Pro Football Reference
- College Football Hall of Fame

Morris "Moe" Gardner Jr. (born August 10, 1968) is an American former professional football player who was a defensive tackle in the National Football League (NFL) for the Atlanta Falcons from 1991 to 1996. He played college football for the Illinois Fighting Illini and was selected by the Falcons in the fourth round of the 1991 NFL draft.

== Early life ==
Gardner graduated from Cathedral High School in Indianapolis, Indiana.

== College career ==
He attended the University of Illinois at Urbana–Champaign, where he played for the Fighting Illini, and he was a two-time consensus All-American in 1989 and 1990. He was selected as the only active player named to Illinois All-Century team in 1990 and ranks second in school history in career tackles for loss. He was named Big Ten Defensive Player of the Year in 1990. He was also named as a finalist for both the Outland Trophy and the Lombardi Award.

== Professional career ==
Gardner was selected by the Atlanta Falcons with the 87th overall pick in the fourth round of the 1991 NFL draft. 1993 is arguably considered to be his strongest season. That year, he recorded 128 tackles leading the Falcons defensive linemen and finishing second overall on the team.

== Honors ==
In January 2022, Gardner was announced as a member of the 2022 class of the College Football Hall of Fame.
