= John Flannery (American football) =

American football player (born 1969)

No. 63, 55
- Positions: Guard, center

Personal information
- Born: January 13, 1969 (age 57); Pottsville, Pennsylvania, U.S.
- Listed height: 6 ft 4 in (1.93 m)
- Listed weight: 303 lb (137 kg)

Career information
- High school: Pottsville
- College: Syracuse
- NFL draft: 1991: 2nd round, 44th overall pick

Career history
- Houston Oilers (1991–1994); Dallas Cowboys (1996–1997); St. Louis Rams (1998–1999)

Awards and highlights
- Super Bowl champion (XXXIV); PFWA All-Rookie Team (1991); Consensus All-American (1990); First-team All-East (1990); Second-team All-East (1989)

Career NFL statistics
- Games played: 80
- Games started: 47
- Fumble recoveries: 5
- Stats at Pro Football Reference

John Joseph Flannery (born January 13, 1969) is an American former professional football player who was an offensive guard and center in the National Football League (NFL) for the Houston Oilers, Dallas Cowboys, and St. Louis Rams. He played college football for the Syracuse Orangemen.

== Early life ==
Flannery attended Pottsville High School, where he played defensive tackle and center. As a senior, he was named defensive MVP of Pennsylvania's Big 33 and won the state heavyweight wrestling championship.

He accepted a football scholarship from Syracuse University. As a redshirt freshman with the Orangemen, he became the starter at left guard for 10 games. As a sophomore, he was named the starting center, where he would remain the rest of his college career. He earned consensus All-American honors as a senior.

In 1999, he was named to the Syracuse University's All-Century team.

== Professional career ==
=== Houston Oilers ===
Flannery was selected by the Houston Oilers in the second round (44th overall) of the 1991 NFL draft. Because future hall of famer Bruce Matthews was the starting center at the time, he was moved to right guard where he started the first 9 games of the season until suffering a knee sprain and playing mainly on special teams after that. He was named to the NFL All-Rookie team.

In 1992, he appeared in 15 games and started 2 at left guard. He injured his left knee returning a short kickoff in the ninth game against the Cleveland Browns. He missed the next game and needed arthroscopic surgery on the knee during the off-season.

In 1993, he was lost for the season with a torn left anterior cruciate ligament he suffered in training camp on July 31. In 1994, he was the regular starter at left guard, making it the first time in his career he started all 16 games.

In 1995, he had surgery during training camp to repair the anterior cruciate ligament in his left knee, which he originally injured in 1993. He was waived injured on August 8.

=== Green Bay Packers ===
On August 10, 1995, he signed a contract with the Green Bay Packers, but it was invalidated after he failed a physical because of his previous knee injury.

=== Dallas Cowboys ===
On October 3, 1996, he was signed 4 weeks into the season as a free agent by the Dallas Cowboys. He spent the season rehabbing his left knee, which was surgically repaired the previous year. He was declared inactive for 10 games, until seeing his first action in the fourth quarter of the season finale against the Washington Redskins.

In 1997, he competed with Clay Shiver for the starting center position that was left open with the release of Ray Donaldson, but he ended up as the backup and started 4 games at left guard.

=== St. Louis Rams ===
On April 1, 1998, he was signed as a free agent by the St. Louis Rams and was named the starter at center. The next year, he was placed on the injured reserve list, in a season the team went on to win Super Bowl XXXIV. He wasn't re-signed after the season.
