= 1990 All-America college football team =

Official list of the best college football players of 1990

The 1990 All-America college football team is composed of college football players who were selected as All-Americans by various organizations and writers that chose College Football All-America Teams in 1990. The National Collegiate Athletic Association (NCAA) recognizes five selectors as "official" for the 1990 season. They are: (1) the American Football Coaches Association (AFCA); (2) the Associated Press (AP) selected based on the votes of sports writers at AP newspapers; (3) the Football Writers Association of America (FWAA); (4) the United Press International (UPI) selected based on the votes of sports writers at UPI newspapers; and (5) the Walter Camp Football Foundation (WC). Other notable selectors included Football News, the Gannett News Service, Newspaper Enterprise Association in conjunction with World Almanac, Scripps Howard (SH), and The Sporting News (TSN).

== Consensus All-Americans ==
The following charts identify the NCAA-recognized consensus All-Americans for the year 1990 and display which first-team designations they received.

=== Offense ===
Name	Position	School	Number	Official	Other
Eric Bieniemy	Running back	Colorado	5/5/10	AFCA, AP, FWAA, UPI, WCFF	FN, GNS, NEA, SH, TSN
Raghib Ismail	Wide receiver	Notre Dame	5/5/10	AFCA, AP, FWAA, UPI, WCFF	FN, GNS, NEA, SH, TSN
Antone Davis	Tackle	Tennessee	5/5/10	AFCA, AP, FWAA, UPI, WCFF	FN, GNS, NEA, SH, TSN
Joe Garten	Guard	Colorado	5/4/9	AFCA, AP, FWAA, UPI, WCFF	FN, NEA, SH, TSN
Ty Detmer	Quarterback	Brigham Young	4/5/9	AP, FWAA, UPI, WCFF	FN, GNS, NEA, SH, TSN
Chris Smith	Tight end	Brigham Young	5/3/8	AFCA, AP, FWAA, UPI, WCFF	FN, SH, TSN
Ed King	Guard	Auburn	5/3/8	AFCA, AP, FWAA, UPI, WCFF	FN, NEA, SH
John Flannery	Center	Syracuse	4/4/8	AFCA, AP, UPI, WCFF	GNS, NEA, SH, TSN
Herman Moore	Wide receiver	Virginia	3/4/7	AP, FWAA, UPI	FN, NEA, SH, TSN
Darren Lewis	Running back	Texas A&M	4/2/6	AFCA, AP, UPI, WCFF	FN, GNS
Stacy Long	Tackle	Clemson	3/2/5	AP, FWAA, UPI	FN, TSN

=== Defense ===
Name	Position	School	Number	Official	Other
Russell Maryland	Defensive tackle	Miami	5/5/10	AFCA, AP, FWAA, UPI, WCFF	FN, GNS, NEA, SH, TSN
Alfred Williams	Linebacker	Colorado	5/5/10	AFCA, AP, FWAA, UPI, WCFF	FN, GNS, NEA, SH, TSN
Ken Swilling	Defensive back	Georgia Tech	5/5/10	AFCA, AP, FWAA, UPI, WCFF	FN, GNS, NEA, SH, TSN
Tripp Welborne	Defensive back	Michigan	5/5/10	AFCA, AP, FWAA, UPI, WCFF	FN, NEA, SH, TSN, FN
Chris Zorich	Defensive tackle	Notre Dame	5/4/9	AFCA, AP, FWAA, UPI, WCFF	FN, NEA, SH, TSN
Michael Stonebreaker	Linebacker	Notre Dame	5/2/7	AFCA, AP, FWAA, UPI, WCFF	NEA, TSN
Darryll Lewis	Defensive back	Arizona	5/2/7	AFCA, AP, FWAA, UPI, WCFF	FN, TSN
Maurice Crum	Linebacker	Miami (Fla)	4/3/7	AP, FWAA, UPI, WCFF	FN, NEA, TSN
Todd Lyght	Defensive back	Notre Dame	3/3/6	AFCA, UPI, WCFF	GNS, NEA, SH
Moe Gardner	Nose guard	Illinois	3/2/5	AFCA, UPI, WCFF	GNS, SH
David Rocker	Defensive tackle	Auburn	3/1/4	AFCA, UPI, WCFF	NEA

=== Special teams ===
Name	Position	School	Number	Official	Other
Philip Doyle	Placekicker	Alabama	5/4/9	AFCA, AP, FWAA, UPI, WCFF	FN, NEA, SH, TSN
Brian Greenfield	Punter	Pittsburgh	3/2/5	FWAA, UPI, WCFF	SH, TSN

== Offense ==
=== Quarterback ===
- Ty Detmer, Brigham Young (CFHOF) (AP-1, FWAA [tie], UPI-1, WCFF, FN, GNS, NEA-1, SH, TSN)
- Shawn Moore, Virginia (AFCA, AP-2, FWAA [tie], UPI-2, NEA-2)
- David Klingler, Houston (AP-3)

=== Running backs ===
- Eric Bieniemy, Colorado (AFCA, AP-1, FWAA, UPI-1, WCFF, FN, GNS, NEA-1, SH, TSN)
- Darren Lewis, Texas A&M (AFCA, AP-1, UPI-1, WCFF, FN, GNS, NEA-2)
- Greg Lewis, Washington (AP-2, NEA-1, UPI-2, WCFF, SH, TSN)
- Mike Mayweather, Army (AP-3, FWAA, UPI-2, NEA-2)
- Gerald Hudson, Oklahoma State (AP-2)
- Sheldon Canley, San Jose State (AP-3)

=== Wide receivers ===
- Raghib Ismail, Notre Dame (AFCA, AP-1 [kick returner], FWAA [kick returner], UPI-1, WCFF, FN, GNS, NEA-1, SH, TSN, FN)
- Herman Moore, Virginia (AP-1, UPI-1, NEA-1, FWAA, SH, TSN, FN)
- Lawrence Dawsey, Florida State (AP-1, FWAA, UPI-2, GNS)
- Ed McCaffrey, Stanford (AFCA, NEA-2)
- Manny Hazard, Houston (AP-3, UPI-2, SH)
- Wesley Carroll, Miami (AP-2)
- Patrick Rowe, San Diego State (AP-2)
- Jeff Graham, Ohio State (NEA-2)
- Bobby Slaughter, Louisiana Tech (AP-3)

=== Tight end ===
- Chris Smith, Brigham Young (AFCA, AP-1, FWAA, UPI-1, WCFF, FN, NEA-2, SH, TSN)
- Kerry Cash, Texas (NEA-1)
- Kirk Kirkpatrick, Florida (AP-2, UPI-2)
- Kelly Blackwell, Texas Christian (AP-3, GNS)

=== Tackles ===
- Antone Davis, Tennessee (AFCA, AP-1, FWAA, UPI-1, WCFF, FN, GNS, NEA-1, SH, TSN)
- Stacy Long, Clemson (AP-1, UPI-1, FWAA, TSN, FN)
- Greg Skrepenak, Michigan (UPI-2, WCFF, NEA-2)
- Bob Whitfield, Stanford (SH)
- Mike Sullivan, Miami (Fla.) (UPI-2, NEA-1)
- Pat Harlow, USC (AP-2, GNS)
- Stan Thomas, Texas (AP-2)
- Charles McRae, Tennessee (AP-3, GNS)
- Mark Vander Poel, Colorado (NEA-2)
- Jeff Pahukoa, Washington (AP-3)

=== Guards ===
- Joe Garten, Colorado (AFCA, AP-1, UPI-1, NEA-1, WCFF, FWAA, SH, TSN, FN)
- Ed King, Auburn (AFCA, AP-1, UPI-1, NEA-1, WCFF, FWAA, SH, FN)
- Dean Dingman, Michigan (AFCA, AP-2, UPI-2, NEA-2, TSN)
- Gene Williams, Iowa State (GNS)
- Eric Moten, Michigan State (AP-2, UPI-2)
- Mark Tucker, USC (AP-3, NEA-2)
- Ricky Byrd, Mississippi State (AP-3)

=== Center ===
- John Flannery, Syracuse (AFCA, AP-1, UPI-1, WCFF, GNS, NEA-1, SH, TSN)
- Mike Arthur, Texas A&M (AP-2, FWAA)
- Mike Heldt, Notre Dame (AP-3, UPI-2, FN, NEA-2)

== Defense ==
=== Defensive ends ===
- Kenny Walker, Nebraska (AP-1, FWAA, UPI-2, FN, NEA-2, TSN)
- Huey Richardson, Florida (AP-1, UPI-2, FN [linebacker])
- Mitch Donahue, Wyoming (AP-2, FWAA, UPI-2, GNS, NEA-2, TSN)
- Steve Emtman, Washington (AP-2)
- Shane Dronett, Texas (AP-3)
- Kelvin Pritchett, Ole Miss (AP-3)

=== Defensive tackles ===
- Chris Zorich, Notre Dame (CFHOF) (AFCA, AP-1, UPI-1, NEA-1, WCFF, FWAA, SH, TSN, FN)
- Russell Maryland, Miami (CFHOF) (AFCA, AP-1, FWAA, UPI-1, WCFF, FN, GNS, NEA-1, SH, TSN)
- David Rocker, Auburn (AFCA, AP-2, UPI-1, NEA-1, WCFF)
- George Thornton, Alabama (AP-3)
- Frank Giannetti, Penn State (AP-3)

=== Nose guards ===
- Moe Gardner, Illinois (AFCA, AP-2, UPI-1, WCFF, GNS, NEA-2, SH)

=== Linebackers ===
- Michael Stonebreaker, Notre Dame (AFCA, AP-1, UPI, NEA-1, WCFF, FWAA, TSN)
- Alfred Williams, Colorado (CFHOF) (AFCA [line], AP-1, FWAA, UPI, WCFF, FWAA, FN, GNS, NEA-1, SH, TSN)
- Maurice Crum, Miami,(Fla) (AP-1, UPI, NEA-1, WCFF, FWAA, TSN, FN)
- Scott Ross, USC (AFCA, UPI-2, SH)
- Mike Croel, Nebraska (AP-2, UPI-2, GNS, NEA-1, SH)
- Marco Coleman, Georgia Tech (NEA-2, SH)
- Darrick Brownlow, Illinois (AP-2, UPI-2, FN, NEA-2)
- Levon Kirkland, Clemson (AP-2, UPI-2, GNS)
- Roman Phifer, UCLA (GNS)
- Kirk Carruthers, Florida State (NEA-2)
- Melvin Foster, Iowa (NEA-2)
- Robert Jones, East Carolina (AP-3)
- Marvin Jones, Florida State (AP-3)
- Mark Sander, Louisville (AP-3)

=== Defensive backs ===
- Ken Swilling, Georgia Tech (AFCA, AP-1, FWAA, UPI-1, WCFF, FN, GNS [safety], NEA-1, SH, TSN)
- Tripp Welborne, Michigan (AFCA, AP-1 UPI-1, NEA-1, WCFF, FWAA, SH, TSN, FN)
- Darryll Lewis, Arizona (AFCA, AP-1, FWAA, UPI-1, WCFF, FN, NEA-2, SH, TSN)
- Todd Lyght, Notre Dame (AFCA, AP-2, UPI-1, WCFF, GNS [cornerback], NEA-1
- Jesse Campbell, North Carolina State (AP-3, UPI-2, TSN, FN)
- Stanley Richard, Texas (AP-1)
- Merton Hanks, Iowa (AP-3, NEA-1)
- Will White, Florida (AP-3, FWAA, UPI-2, NEA-2, SH)
- Eric Turner, UCLA (AP-2, UPI-2, GNS [safety], NEA-2)
- Steve Jackson, Purdue (GNS [cornerback])
- Nathan LaDuke, Arizona State (AP-2, NEA-2)
- Terrell Buckley, Florida State (AP-2)
- Richard Fain, Florida (UPI-2)
- Kerry Valrie, Southern Mississippi (AP-3)

== Special teams ==
=== Placekicker ===
- Philip Doyle, Alabama (AFCA, AP-1, UPI-1, NEA-1, WCFF, FWAA, SH, TSN, FN)
- Chris Gardocki, Clemson (AP-2, UPI-2)
- Roman Anderson, Houston (NEA-2)
- Michael Pollak, Texas (AP-3)

=== Punter ===
- Brian Greenfield, Pittsburgh (AP-2, FWAA, UPI-1, WCFF, NEA-2, SH, TSN)
- Cris Shale, Bowling Green (AFCA, AP-1, UPI-2, FN)
- Jason Hanson, Washington State (AP-3, GNS [kicker], NEA-1)

=== All-purpose / kick returners ===
- Dale Carter, Tennessee (AP-2, TSN)
- Desmond Howard, Michigan (AP-3)

== Key ==
- **Bold** – Consensus All-American
- CFHOF - Inducted into the College Football Hall of Fame
- -1 – First-team selection
- -2 – Second-team selection
- -3 – Third-team selection

=== Official selectors ===
- AFCA – selected by 3,000 active members of the American Football Coaches Association, also known as the "Kodak All-America Team"
- AP – Associated Press
- FWAA – Football Writers Association of America
- UPI – United Press International
- WCFF – Walter Camp Football Foundation

=== Other selectors ===
- FN – Football News
- GNS - Gannett News Service
- NEA – Newspaper Enterprise Association in conjunction with World Almanac
- SH - Scripps Howard
- TSN – The Sporting News

== See also ==
- 1990 All-Atlantic Coast Conference football team
- 1990 All-Big Eight Conference football team
- 1990 All-Big Ten Conference football team
- 1990 All-Pacific-10 Conference football team
- 1990 All-SEC football team
