= David Rocker (American football) =

American football player and coach (born 1969)

No. 92
- Position: Defensive tackle

Personal information
- Born: March 12, 1969 (age 57); Atlanta, Georgia, U.S.
- Listed height: 6 ft 4 in (1.93 m)
- Listed weight: 267 lb (121 kg)

Career information
- High school: South Atlanta
- College: Auburn
- NFL draft: 1991: 4th round, 101st overall pick

Career history

Playing
- Houston Oilers (1991)*; Los Angeles Rams (1991–1994)
- * Offseason or practice squad member only

Coaching
- Point (2013–2014) (head coach)

Awards and highlights
- Consensus All-American (1990); 2× First-team All-SEC (1989, 1990)

Career NFL statistics
- Games played–started: 34–4
- Tackles: 56
- Sacks: 1.5
- Stats at Pro Football Reference

David Deaundra Rocker (born March 12, 1969) is an American former football player and coach. He played professionally as a defensive tackle in the National Football League (NFL) for four seasons with the Los Angeles Rams from 1991 to 1994. He was selected by the Houston Oilers in the fourth round of the 1991 NFL draft. Rocker served as the head football coach at Point University in West Point, Georgia from 2013 to 2014. Rocker was born in Atlanta, Georgia, attended high school at Fulton High School—now known as South Atlanta High School—and played college football at Auburn University.

== Personal life ==
His wife is Connie Rocker. Rocker’s older brother Tracy is also a former professional football player. His nephew, Kumar Rocker, is a pitcher for the Texas Rangers

== Head coaching record ==
Year	Team	Overall	Conference	Standing	Bowl/playoffs
Point Skyhawks (NAIA independent) (2013)
2013	Point	3–7			
Point Skyhawks (Sun Conference) (2013)
2014	Point	0–9	0–5	6th	
Point:		3–16	0–5		
Total:		3–16			
