= Richard Fain =

American football player (born 1968)

No. 31, 24
- Position: Cornerback

Personal information
- Born: February 29, 1968 (age 58)
- Listed height: 6 ft 0 in (1.83 m)
- Listed weight: 185 lb (84 kg)

Career information
- High school: North Fort Myers (North Fort Myers, Florida)
- College: Florida
- NFL draft: 1991: 6th round, 157th overall pick

Career history
- Cincinnati Bengals (1991); Phoenix Cardinals (1991); Chicago Bears (1992–1993); Washington Redskins (1994)*
- * Offseason or practice squad member only

Awards and highlights
- 2× Second-team All-American (1989, 1990); 2× First-team All-SEC (1989, 1990)

Career NFL statistics
- Interceptions: 1
- Stats at Pro Football Reference

Richard Alexander Fain (born February 29, 1968) is an American former professional football player who was a cornerback in the National Football League (NFL) for two seasons during the early 1990s. Fain played college football for the Florida Gators, and thereafter, he played professionally for the Cincinnati Bengals, Phoenix Cardinals and Chicago Bears of the NFL.

== Early life ==
Fain was born in Fort Myers, Florida. He attended North Fort Myers High School in North Fort Myers, and was a standout high school football player for the North Fort Myers Red Knights.

== College career ==
Fain Accepted an athletic scholarship to attend the University of Florida in Gainesville, Florida, where he played for coach Galen Hall and coach Steve Spurrier's Gators teams from 1987 to 1990. He had ten interceptions in four seasons, and received first-team All-Southeastern Conference (SEC) honors in 1989 and 1990, and was also a second-team All-American in 1989 and 1990. Memorably, in 1990, he recovered a punt blocked by Jimmy Spencer, and returned it twenty-five yards for a touchdown—the margin of victory in the Gators' 17–13 victory over the Alabama Crimson Tide.

Fain graduated from the University of Florida with a bachelor's degree in exercise and sport sciences in 1990.

== Professional career ==
The Cincinnati Bengals selected Fain in the sixth round (157th pick overall) of the 1991 NFL draft. He played for the Bengals and Phoenix Cardinals during the 1991 season. He played his second and final year in the NFL for the Chicago Bears in 1992. In Fain's two-season NFL career, he played in twenty-four regular season games and started eight of them.

== See also ==
- Florida Gators football, 1980–89
- Florida Gators football, 1990–99
- List of Chicago Bears players
- List of Florida Gators in the NFL draft
- List of University of Florida alumni
