= Brian Greenfield =

American football player (born 1969)

Brian Greenfield (born June 6, 1969) is an American former college football player who was a punter with the Pittsburgh Panthers.

He was selected to the 1990 College Football All-America Team. Greenfield went to the University of Pittsburgh in 1989 from Glendale Community College (Calif.), and was the Panthers' regular punter for the 1989 and 1990 seasons. In 1990, he finished as the second-ranked punter in the nation with a school-record 45.6-yard average. He set a Pitt record for longest punt—a 79-yard boomer against Boston College in 1990—and his 43.5-yard career punting average also established a Pitt record.

Greenfield was selected in the tenth round of the 1991 NFL draft, as the 252nd overall pick. During his one Season with the Browns, he recorded no game statistics.
