= Stacy Long (American football) =

American football player (born 1967)

Clemson Tigers
- Position: Guard

Personal information
- Born: September 30, 1967 (age 59)

Career information
- College: Clemson (1990)

Awards and highlights
- Consensus All-American (1990); Third-team All-American (1989); 2× First-team All-ACC (1989, 1990)

Stacy Long (born September 30, 1967) is an American former football player who was a consensus All-American at offensive guard during his senior year of college football with the Clemson Tigers in 1990. Long was drafted in the 11th round of the 1991 NFL draft by the Chicago Bears, but didn't play in the NFL.
