= Pat Harlow =

American football player (born 1969)

No. 77, 75
- Position: Offensive tackle

Personal information
- Born: March 16, 1969 (age 57); Norco, California, U.S.
- Listed height: 6 ft 6 in (1.98 m)
- Listed weight: 295 lb (134 kg)

Career information
- High school: Norco
- College: USC
- NFL draft: 1991: 1st round, 11th overall pick

Career history
- New England Patriots (1991–1995); Oakland Raiders (1996–1998)

Awards and highlights
- PFWA All-Rookie Team (1991); New England Patriots All-1990s Team; Second-team All-American (1990); Morris Trophy (1990); First-team All-Pac-10 (1990)

Career NFL statistics
- Games played: 105
- Games started: 94
- Fumble recoveries: 2
- Stats at Pro Football Reference

Patrick Christopher Harlow (born March 16, 1969) is an American former professional football player who was an offensive tackle in the National Football League (NFL). He played college football for the USC Trojans. His son, Sean Harlow, became a center in the NFL.

== College career ==
Harlow played college football at the University of Southern California and won the Morris Trophy. He blocked for quarterbacks Todd Marinovich and Rodney Peete and cleared the way for Ricky Ervins in college.

== Playing career ==
Harlow was drafted by the New England Patriots in the first round of the 1991 NFL Draft with the 11th overall pick. He played in the National Football League between 1991 and 1998.

== Later life ==
He became the football head coach at JSerra Catholic High School in San Juan Capistrano, California, in late 2016.
