= 2000 New England Patriots season =

41st season in franchise history; first with coach Bill Belichick

- Owner: Robert Kraft
- Head coach: Bill Belichick
- Home stadium: Foxboro Stadium

Results
- Record: 5–11
- Division place: 5th AFC East
- Playoffs: Did not qualify
- All-Pros: None
- Pro Bowlers: None

Uniform
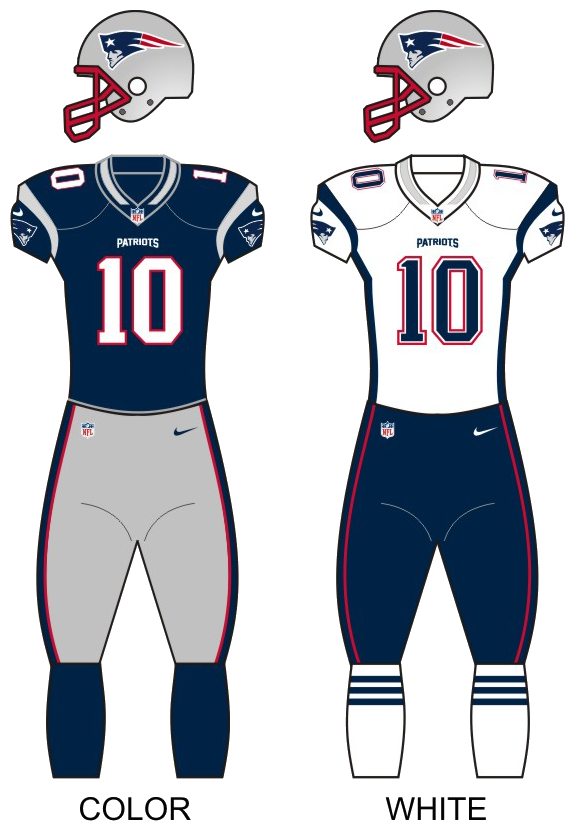

The 2000 season was the New England Patriots' 31st in the National Football League (NFL) and their 41st overall. They finished with a 5–11 record and in last place in the division. It would be the first season the franchise would have involving quarterback Tom Brady (although he would not start any games until the following season). He would play 20 seasons as a Patriot, a franchise record. However, he wasn't given the starting job until next season. This was Tom Brady's only season on a team with a losing record until 2022, and the only time that his team lost twice to the same AFC East team during the regular season.

Following the firing of three-year head coach Pete Carroll in January, Patriots owner Bob Kraft pursued Jets assistant head coach Bill Belichick for the Patriots' head coaching vacancy. Belichick, who had been an assistant coach under Bill Parcells with the Patriots in 1996, followed Parcells to the Jets after that season and was contractually named Parcells' successor. A day after the 1999 season, Parcells resigned as head coach of the Jets and made his second retirement from NFL coaching. Belichick, who had been assistant head coach of the Jets, became the Jets' next head coach. The following day, at a press conference for his hiring, Belichick wrote a resignation note on a sheet of loose-leaf paper ("I resign as HC of the NYJ."), and proceeded to give a half-hour resignation speech to the press. Despite rumors that he had been offered the Patriots' vacant head coaching position, Belichick cited the Jets' uncertain ownership situation following the death of owner Leon Hess earlier that year as the reason for his resignation. The Jets denied Belichick permission to speak with other teams, and as had happened in 1997 with Parcells, the NFL upheld Belichick's contractual obligations to the Jets. Belichick then filed an antitrust lawsuit against the NFL in federal court. After, Parcells and Kraft, talking for the first time since Parcells' resignation from the Patriots, agreed to settle their differences, the Patriots and Jets agreed to a compensation package to allow Belichick to become the Patriots' head coach. With the deal, the Patriots sent their first-round pick in the 2000 NFL draft and fourth and seventh-round picks in the 2001 NFL draft to the Jets, while also receiving the Jets' fifth-round selection in 2001 and seventh-round pick in the 2002 NFL draft.

Belichick restructured the team's personnel department in the offseason, and later proclaimed that the team "could not win with 40 good players while the other team has 53," after a number of players showed up out of shape for the start of training camp. The Patriots went on to finish the season 5–11, finishing last in the AFC East and missing the playoffs for the second straight season.

The 2000 Pro Football Hall of Fame Game vs the San Francisco 49ers, a 20–0 victory for the Patriots, would be the first game of third-string rookie Tom Brady's exalted 20-year career with the Patriots, playing his final three seasons with the Tampa Bay Buccaneers afterward. Their first year in New England would be the only season from 1996 to 2019 where the Patriots finished with a losing record. Brady would retire in 2023, which would also mark Belichick's last season with the Patriots after leading New England to a cumulative 266–121–0 regular season record, 30–12 playoffs record, 17 division titles, 9 AFC conference championships and a record 6 Super Bowl victories as head coach (and record 8 total Super Bowl victories, including assistant coaching experience with the Giants.) After the season, Bruce Armstrong retired.

This was the last time the Patriots finished last in the AFC East until the 2023 season.

== Offseason after 1999 season ==
On January 27, 2000, the Patriots hired Bill Belichick as their next head coach of team.

Additions	Subtractions
TE Eric Bjornson (Cowboys)	WR Shawn Jefferson (Falcons)
LB Chad Cascadden (Jets)	RB Terry Allen (Saints)
C Lance Scott (Giants)	DT Chris Sullivan (Steelers)
T Grant Williams (Seahawks)	TE Ben Coates (Ravens)
CB Antonio Langham (Browns)	TE Mike Bartrum (Eagles)
DE Bobby Hamilton (Jets)	LB Marty Moore (Browns)
CB Otis Smith (Jets)	G Heath Irwin (Dolphins)
WR Chris Calloway (Falcons)	T Ed Ellis (Redskins)
WR Aaron Bailey (Raiders)	CB Steve Israel (Saints)

=== 2000 NFL draft ===
2000 New England Patriots draft
Round	Pick	Player	Position	College	Notes
2	46	Adrian Klemm	Offensive tackle	Hawaii	
3	76	J. R. Redmond	Running back	Arizona State	
4	127	Greg Robinson-Randall	Offensive tackle	Michigan State	
5	141	Dave Stachelski	Tight end	Boise State	
5	161	Jeff Marriott	Defensive tackle	Missouri	(Note: The Patriots' received the St. Louis Rams' fifth-round pick in 2000 as part of a trade for Mike Jones in 1998.)
6	187	Antwan Harris	Safety	Virginia	
6	199	Tom Brady *	Quarterback	Michigan	
6	201	David Nugent	Defensive end	Purdue	
7	226	Casey Tisdale	Linebacker	New Mexico	
7	239	Patrick Pass	Fullback	Georgia	
Made roster * Made at least one Pro Bowl during career

=== Undrafted free agents ===
2000 undrafted free agents of note
Player	Position	College
Maurice Anderson	Defensive tackle	Virginia
Terrance Beadles	Guard	Arkansas–Pine Bluff
Matt Bumgardner	Wide receiver	Texas A&M
Adam Davis	Guard	Oklahoma State
Shockmain Davis	Wide receiver	Angelo State
Chris Eitzmann	Tight end	Harvard
John Eskridge	Linebacker	Southwest Missouri State
Rob Gatrell	Guard	Fresno State
Reggie Grimes	Defensive end	Alabama
Chad Holleman	Kicker	Georgia
Jimmy Kibble	Punter	Virginia Tech
Lonie Paxton	Long snapper	Sacramento State
Scott Pospisil	Defensive end	Iowa
Rodney Rideau	Safety	Oklahoma
Thad Sheldon	Long snapper	Iowa
Jamel Smith	Linebacker	Virginia Tech
Maugaula Tuitele	Linebacker	Colorado State
Ryan Tujague	Tackle	Washington State
Martinez Williams	Wide receiver	New Mexico
Mike Woods	Cornerback	Oklahoma

== Staff ==
2000 New England Patriots staff
Front office: Chairman/CEO – Robert Kraft; Vice chairman – Jonathan Kraft; Senior vice president/COO – Andy Wasynczuk; Assistant director of player personnel – Scott Pioli; Director of college scouting – Larry Cook; Assistant director of pro scouting – Andre Tippett; Football research director – Ernie Adams; Head coaches: Head coach – Bill Belichick; Assistant head coach/offensive line – Dante Scarnecchia; Offensive coaches: Offensive coordinator/running backs – Charlie Weis; Quarterbacks – Dick Rehbein; Wide receivers – Ivan Fears; Assistant offensive line – Jeff Davidson; Coaching assistant – Ned Burke; Coaching assistant – Brian Daboll	Defensive coaches: Defensive line – Randy Melvin; Linebackers – Rob Ryan; Assistant linebackers – Pepper Johnson; Defensive backs – Eric Mangini; Defensive assistant – DeWayne Walker; Special teams coaches: Special teams – Brad Seely; Coaching assistant – Mark Jackson; Strength and conditioning: Strength and conditioning – Mike Woicik; Assistant strength and conditioning – Markus Paul

== Opening training camp roster ==
As of the Patriots' first training camp practice at Foxboro Stadium on July 17 (practices at Bryant College started on July 23), they had the NFL maximum of 80 players signed to their roster. The Patriots received four roster exemptions for the NFL Europe allocations of Garrett Johnson, Marc Megna, Sean Morey, and Noel Scarlett. Additionally, the Patriots allocated tackle Ed Ellis to NFL Europe and received a roster exemption for him, but he was released before the start of training camp.

New England Patriots 2000 opening training camp roster
Quarterbacks: 7 Michael Bishop; 11 Drew Bledsoe; 12 Tom Brady ^{R}; Running backs: 30 Tony Carter; 33 Kevin Faulk; 37 Chris Floyd FB; 29 Raymont Harris; 35 Patrick Pass FB ^{R}; 21 J. R. Redmond ^{R}; 44 Harold Shaw FB; Wide receivers: 18 Aaron Bailey; 82 Vincent Brisby; 80 Troy Brown; 16 Matt Bumgardner ^{UR}; 19 Shockmain Davis ^{UR}; 14 Tony Gaiter; 88 Terry Glenn; 1 Tony Hamler ^{UR}; 85 Sean Morey; 81 Tony Simmons; Tight ends: 86 Eric Bjornson; 46 Chris Eitzmann ^{UR}; 83 Rod Rutledge; 84 Dave Stachelski ^{R}; 48 Rob Tardio	Offensive linemen: 67 Jason Andersen G; 78 Bruce Armstrong T; 75 Terrance Beadles G ^{UR}; 61 Adam Davis G ^{UR}; 69 Rob Gatrell C ^{UR}; 70 Adrian Klemm G ^{R}; 68 Max Lane T; 77 Greg Robinson-Randall T ^{R}; 63 Lance Scott C; 72 Ryan Tujague T ^{UR}; 62 Brent Warren G; 76 Grant Williams T; 65 Damien Woody C; Defensive linemen: 72 Maurice Anderson NT ^{UR}; 90 Chad Eaton NT; 74 Reggie Grimes DE ^{UR}; 91 Bobby Hamilton DE; 60 Garrett Johnson NT; 93 Jeff Marriott DE ^{R}; 98 Brandon Mitchell DE; 92 David Nugent DE ^{R}; 97 Noel Scarlett NT; 95 Henry Thomas DE	Linebackers: 54 Tedy Bruschi ILB; 51 Chad Cascadden ILB; 52 Ted Johnson ILB; 59 Andy Katzenmoyer ILB; 55 Willie McGinest OLB; 96 Marc Megna ILB; 50 John Munch ILB; 45 Tony Ortiz ILB ^{UR}; 53 Chris Slade OLB; 94 Greg Spires OLB; 99 Casey Tisdale OLB ^{R}; 58 Maugaula Tuitele ILB ^{UR}; Defensive backs: 42 Chris Carter FS; 26 Cory Gilliard SS; 23 Antwan Harris CB ^{R}; 34 Tebucky Jones CB; 38 Antonio Langham CB; 24 Ty Law CB; 22 Kelly Malveaux CB; 36 Lawyer Milloy SS; 39 Rodney Rideau FS ^{UR}; 31 Kato Serwanga CB; 25 Larry Whigham FS; 27 Mike Woods CB ^{UR}; Special teams: -- Chad Holleman K ^{UR}; 10 Lee Johnson P; 5 Jimmy Kibble P ^{UR}; 66 Lonie Paxton LS ^{UR}; -- Thad Sheldon LS ^{UR}; 4 Adam Vinatieri K	Reserve lists data possibly incomplete: 47 Robert Edwards RB (Active/NF-Inj.); 64 Derrick Fletcher G (Active/PUP); 17 John Friesz QB (Active/PUP); 41 Tony George SS (Active/PUP); 71 Todd Rucci G (Active/NF-Inj.); -- Martinez Williams WR (Active/PUP) ^{UR}; Notations: R: 2000 Rookie; UR: 2000 Undrafted Rookie

== Week 1 roster ==
New England Patriots 2000 Week 1 roster
Quarterbacks: 7 Michael Bishop; 11 Drew Bledsoe; 12 Tom Brady ^{R}; 17 John Friesz; Running backs: 30 Tony Carter FB; 33 Kevin Faulk; 37 Chris Floyd FB; 21 J. R. Redmond ^{R}; 44 Harold Shaw FB; Wide receivers: 80 Troy Brown; 82 Chris Calloway; 84 Shockmain Davis ^{UR}; 88 Terry Glenn; 87 Dane Looker ^{UR}; 81 Tony Simmons; Tight ends: 86 Eric Bjornson; 85 Chris Fontenot; 83 Rod Rutledge	Offensive linemen: 67 Jason Andersen G; 78 Bruce Armstrong OT; 61 Adam Davis G ^{UR}; 64 Derrick Fletcher G; 72 Sale Isaia G; 68 Max Lane OT; 77 Greg Robinson-Randall OT ^{R}; 76 Grant Williams OT; 65 Damien Woody C; Defensive linemen: 90 Chad Eaton DT; 97 Reggie Grimes DT ^{UR}; 91 Bobby Hamilton DE; 55 Willie McGinest DE; 98 Brandon Mitchell DT; 92 David Nugent DE ^{R}; 94 Greg Spires DE; 95 Henry Thomas DT	Linebackers: 54 Tedy Bruschi OLB; 58 Matt Chatham OLB ^{UR}; 50 Rob Holmberg OLB; 52 Ted Johnson ILB; 59 Andy Katzenmoyer ILB; 53 Chris Slade OLB; Defensive backs: 41 Tony George SS; 23 Antwan Harris CB ^{R}; 34 Tebucky Jones FS; 38 Antonio Langham CB; 24 Ty Law CB; 36 Lawyer Milloy SS; 31 Kato Serwanga CB; 45 Otis Smith CB; 25 Larry Whigham FS; Special teams: 10 Lee Johnson P; 66 Lonie Paxton LS ^{UR}; 4 Adam Vinatieri K	Reserve lists data possibly incomplete: 75 Terrance Beadles G (IR) ^{UR}; 47 Robert Edwards RB (NF-Inj.); 70 Adrian Klemm G/T (PUP) ^{R}; 71 Todd Rucci G (NF-Inj.); 63 Lance Scott C (IR); Practice squad: -- Carl Bradley DT ^{UR}; 69 Rob Gatrell C ^{UR}; 60 Garrett Johnson DT ^{UR}; 51 Olrick Johnson OLB; 35 Patrick Pass FB ^{R}; Notations: R: 2000 Rookie; UR: 2000 Undrafted Rookie; Italicized players are not on the 53-man roster.

== Final roster ==
New England Patriots 2000 final roster
Quarterbacks: 7 Michael Bishop; 11 Drew Bledsoe; 12 Tom Brady ^{R}; 17 John Friesz; Running backs: 30 Tony Carter; 33 Kevin Faulk; 35 Patrick Pass FB ^{R}; 46 Jeff Paulk FB; 21 J. R. Redmond ^{R}; 44 Harold Shaw FB; Wide receivers: 80 Troy Brown; 84 Shockmain Davis ^{UR}; 88 Terry Glenn; 82 Curtis Jackson; 81 Tony Simmons; Tight ends: 83 Rod Rutledge; 85 Jermaine Wiggins	Offensive linemen: 78 Bruce Armstrong OT; 72 Sale Isaia G; 70 Adrian Klemm G ^{R}; 77 Greg Robinson-Randall OT ^{R}; 62 Josh Rawlings G ^{UR}; 67 Grey Ruegamer C; 76 Grant Williams OT; 65 Damien Woody C; Defensive linemen: 90 Chad Eaton DT; 97 Reggie Grimes DE ^{UR}; 91 Bobby Hamilton DE; 60 Garrett Johnson DT; 55 Willie McGinest DE; 92 David Nugent DE ^{R}; 71 Chuck Osborne DT; 94 Greg Spires DE; 95 Henry Thomas DT	Linebackers: 54 Tedy Bruschi OLB; 93 Antico Dalton OLB; 50 Rob Holmberg MLB; 51 Olrick Johnson OLB; 52 Ted Johnson MLB; 99 Marc Megna OLB; 53 Chris Slade OLB; Defensive backs: 41 Tony George SS; 23 Antwan Harris CB ^{R}; 34 Tebucky Jones FS; 38 Antonio Langham CB; 36 Lawyer Milloy SS; 31 Kato Serwanga CB; 45 Otis Smith CB; 26 Matt Stevens SS; 25 Larry Whigham FS; Special teams: 10 Lee Johnson P; 66 Lonie Paxton LS ^{UR}; 4 Adam Vinatieri K	Reserve lists: 63 Joe Andruzzi G (IR); 75 Terrance Beadles G (IR) ^{UR}; 58 Matt Chatham LB (IR); 47 Robert Edwards RB (NF-Inj.); 86 Chris Eitzmann TE (IR) ^{UR}; 48 John Eskridge LB (IR) ^{UR}; 1 Tony Hamler WR (IR); 59 Andy Katzenmoyer LB (IR); 68 Max Lane RT (IR); 24 Ty Law CB (Susp.); 87 Dane Looker WR (IR) ^{UR}; 98 Brandon Mitchell DT (IR); Practice squad: 9 Brad Costello P; 74 Adam Davis G ^{UR}; 14 Tony Gaiter WR; 69 Rob Gatrell C ^{UR}; 96 Maugaula Tuitele LB ^{UR}; Notations: R: 2000 Rookie; UR: 2000 Undrafted Rookie; Italicized players are not on the 53-man roster.; 53 active, 12 inactive, 5 practice squad

== Schedule ==
=== Preseason ===
Week	Date	Opponent	Result	Record	Venue	Recap
HOF	July 31	vs. San Francisco 49ers	**W** 20–0	1–0	Fawcett Stadium (Canton, Ohio)	Recap
1	August 4	at Detroit Lions	**W** 13–10	2–0	Pontiac Silverdome	Recap
2	August 11	at Washington Redskins	**L** 20–30	2–1	FedExField	Recap
3	August 20	Tampa Bay Buccaneers	**L** 21–31	2–2	Foxboro Stadium	Recap
4	August 24	Carolina Panthers	**W** 29–21	3–2	Foxboro Stadium	Recap

=== Regular season ===
Week	Date	Opponent	Result	Record	Venue	Recap
1	September 3	Tampa Bay Buccaneers	**L** 16–21	0–1	Foxboro Stadium	Recap
2	September 11	at **New York Jets**	**L** 19–20	0–2	Giants Stadium	Recap
3	September 17	Minnesota Vikings	**L** 13–21	0–3	Foxboro Stadium	Recap
4	September 24	at **Miami Dolphins**	**L** 3–10	0–4	Pro Player Stadium	Recap
5	October 1	at Denver Broncos	**W** 28–19	1–4	Mile High Stadium	Recap
6	October 8	**Indianapolis Colts**	**W** 24–16	2–4	Foxboro Stadium	Recap
7	October 15	**New York Jets**	**L** 17–34	2–5	Foxboro Stadium	Recap
8	October 22	at **Indianapolis Colts**	**L** 23–30	2–6	RCA Dome	Recap
9	Bye					
10	November 5	**Buffalo Bills**	**L** 13–16 (OT)	2–7	Foxboro Stadium	Recap
11	November 12	at Cleveland Browns	**L** 11–19	2–8	Cleveland Browns Stadium	Recap
12	November 19	Cincinnati Bengals	**W** 16–13	3–8	Foxboro Stadium	Recap
13	November 23	at Detroit Lions	**L** 9–34	3–9	Pontiac Silverdome	Recap
14	December 4	Kansas City Chiefs	**W** 30–24	4–9	Foxboro Stadium	Recap
15	December 10	at Chicago Bears	**L** 17–24	4–10	Soldier Field	Recap
16	December 17	at **Buffalo Bills**	**W** 13–10 (OT)	5–10	Ralph Wilson Stadium	Recap
17	December 24	**Miami Dolphins**	**L** 24–27	5–11	Foxboro Stadium	Recap
Note: Intra-division opponents are in **bold** text.

=== Standings ===
AFC East
	W	L	T	PCT	PF	PA	STK
^{(3)} Miami Dolphins	11	5	0	.688	323	226	W1
^{(6)} Indianapolis Colts	10	6	0	.625	429	326	W3
New York Jets	9	7	0	.563	321	321	L3
Buffalo Bills	8	8	0	.500	315	350	W1
New England Patriots	5	11	0	.313	276	338	L1
