= 1999 New England Patriots season =

40th season in franchise history

- Owner: Robert Kraft
- Head coach: Pete Carroll
- Home stadium: Foxboro Stadium

Results
- Record: 8–8
- Division place: T-4th AFC East
- Playoffs: Did not qualify
- All-Pros: SS Lawyer Milloy (1st team)
- Pro Bowlers: WR Terry Glenn; SS Lawyer Milloy

The 1999 New England Patriots season was the franchise's 30th season in the National Football League and the 40th overall. They finished with an 8–8 record and tied for fourth place in the division. They did not qualify for the playoffs.

In May, the Patriots announced their intention to pull out of a publicly financed stadium deal in Hartford, Connecticut, and instead work towards building a privately financed new stadium. This became the Gillette Stadium at the site of the existing Foxboro Stadium in Foxborough, Massachusetts. The Patriots came into the 1999 season without second-year running back Robert Edwards due to a serious knee injury, after rushing for over 1,100 yards in 1998. Taking Edwards' place were veteran Terry Allen and rookie Kevin Faulk, but neither player was able to eclipse 1,000 yards rushing and overall the Patriots' rushing offense was 23rd in the NFL. After beginning the season with a 6–2 record the team slowed down and finished 8–8, missing the playoffs for the first time since 1995. Following the season finale third year head coach Pete Carroll was fired, while vice president of player personnel Bobby Grier was retained until the 2000 NFL draft. This would be the Patriots' last season without Bill Belichick until 2024.

== Offseason ==
Additions	Subtractions
QB John Friesz (Seahawks)	P Tom Tupa (Jets)
RB Terry Allen (Redskins)	LB Todd Collins (Rams)
P Lee Johnson (Bengals)	

=== 1999 NFL draft ===
1999 New England Patriots Draft Selections
Round	Overall	Player	Position	College
1	17	Damien Woody	Center	Boston College
1 (Note: The Patriots received third- and fourth-round picks in 1997, a second-round pick in 1998, and a first-round pick in 1999 from the New York Jets as compensation for the Jets' 1997 signing of Bill Parcells as head coach.)	28	Andy Katzenmoyer	Linebacker	Ohio State
2	46	Kevin Faulk	Running back	LSU
3	91	Tony George	Safety	Florida
5	154	Derrick Fletcher	Offensive guard	Baylor
6	180	Marcus Washington	Safety	Colorado
7	227	Michael Bishop	Quarterback	Kansas State
7	241	Sean Morey	Wide receiver	Brown

compensatory selection

1999 New England Patriots Supplemental Draft Selections
Round	Overall	Player	Position	College
4	–	J'Juan Cherry	Cornerback	Arizona State

=== Undrafted free agents ===
1999 undrafted free agents of note
Player	Position	College
Dan Collins	Guard	Boston College

== Staff ==
1999 New England Patriots staff
Front office: Chairman/CEO – Robert Kraft; Vice-president – Jonathan Kraft; Senior vice president/COO – Andy Wasynczuk; Vice president of player personnel – Bobby Grier; Director of college scouting – Larry Cook; Director of pro scouting – Dave Uyrus; Assistant director of pro scouting – Andre Tippett; Head coaches: Head coach – Pete Carroll; Offensive coaches: Offensive coordinator – Ernie Zampese; Quarterbacks – Jack Reilly; Running backs – Kirby Wilson; Wide receivers – Ivan Fears; Tight ends – Carl Smith; Offensive line – Dante Scarnecchia; Offensive line assistant – Jeff Davidson	Defensive coaches: Defensive coordinator – Steve Sidwell; Defensive line – Ray Hamilton; Linebackers – Bo Pelini; Defensive backs – Ron Lynn; Defensive assistant/secondary – DeWayne Walker; Special teams coaches: Special teams – Brad Seely; Strength and conditioning: Strength and conditioning – Johnny Parker

== Schedule ==
Week	Date	Opponent	Result	Record	Venue	Recap
1	September 12	at **New York Jets**	**W** 30–28	1–0	Giants Stadium	Recap
2	September 19	**Indianapolis Colts**	**W** 31–28	2–0	Foxboro Stadium	Recap
3	September 26	New York Giants	**W** 16–14	3–0	Foxboro Stadium	Recap
4	October 3	at Cleveland Browns	**W** 19–7	4–0	Cleveland Browns Stadium	Recap
5	October 10	at Kansas City Chiefs	**L** 14–16	4–1	Arrowhead Stadium	Recap
6	October 17	**Miami Dolphins**	**L** 30–31	4–2	Foxboro Stadium	Recap
7	October 24	Denver Broncos	**W** 24–23	5–2	Foxboro Stadium	Recap
8	October 31	at Arizona Cardinals	**W** 27–3	6–2	Sun Devil Stadium	Recap
9	Bye					
10	November 15	**New York Jets**	**L** 17–24	6–3	Foxboro Stadium	Recap
11	November 21	at **Miami Dolphins**	**L** 17–27	6–4	Pro Player Stadium	Recap
12	November 28	at **Buffalo Bills**	**L** 7–17	6–5	Ralph Wilson Stadium	Recap
13	December 5	Dallas Cowboys	**W** 13–6	7–5	Foxboro Stadium	Recap
14	December 12	at **Indianapolis Colts**	**L** 15–20	7–6	RCA Dome	Recap
15	December 19	at Philadelphia Eagles	**L** 9–24	7–7	Veterans Stadium	Recap
16	December 26	**Buffalo Bills**	**L** 10–13 (OT)	7–8	Foxboro Stadium	Recap
17	January 2	Baltimore Ravens	**W** 20–3	8–8	Foxboro Stadium	Recap
Note: Intra-division opponents are in **bold** text.

== Standings ==
AFC East
	W	L	T	PCT	PF	PA	STK
^{(2)} Indianapolis Colts	13	3	0	.813	423	333	L1
^{(5)} Buffalo Bills	11	5	0	.688	320	229	W3
^{(6)} Miami Dolphins	9	7	0	.563	326	336	L2
New York Jets	8	8	0	.500	308	309	W4
New England Patriots	8	8	0	.500	299	284	W1

== Notable games ==
- September 12 at New York Jets:

The Jets lost quarterback Vinny Testaverde in the second quarter when he ruptured his left Achilles tendon, and backup Tom Tupa (a former Patriots punter) was put in; regular backup Rick Mirer was listed as emergency quarterback and was not eligible to enter the game until the fourth quarter. The Patriots rallied from down 16–10 at the half with 17 points scored in the third quarter, but the Jets stormed back themselves with two touchdowns on a Tupa throw to Fred Baxter and a Bryan Cox interception return; both times the Jets went for two-point conversions but failed. Mirer was put in late in the fourth and a throw was deflected by Ty Law and recovered by Chris Slade. Drew Bledsoe completed key first downs to Terry Glenn and Troy Brown, setting up the game-winning Adam Vinatieri field goal of a 30–28 Patriots win. Kevin Faulk made his Patriots debut in this game, rushing ten times for 17 yards and catching one pass for eight yards.

- September 19 vs. Indianapolis Colts:

The Patriots committed 15 penalties eating up 135 yards and trailed 28–7 at halftime in Peyton Manning's second career trip to Foxboro. But Bledsoe answered with touchdowns to Terry Allen and Ben Coates to tie the game late in the fourth; the two Coates scores came off a Marcus Pollard fumble and a Manning three and out forced by Ty Law. Edgerrin James was then stripped by Tebucky Jones, setting up the game winning Vinatieri field goal of a 31–28 Patriots comeback. Coates's fourth quarter scores turned out to be the last of his career.

- October 3 at Cleveland Browns:

The Patriots trailed the Browns 6-7 at halftime with only two field goals. The Browns only score being a Kevin Johnson 64 yard touchdown reception from Tim Couch. Bledsoe amassed 393 yards passing and a 54 yard touchdown pass to Terry Glenn having a career day breaking a team record with 13 receptions and 214 receiving yards. Terry Allen also scored on a 3 yard touchdown run.

- October 10 at Kansas City Chiefs:

Trailing 7–3 at the half, the Chiefs behind Elvis Grbac scored 13 points in the second half. The Patriots scored in the fourth on a Shawn Jefferson touchdown catch, then in the final minute the Patriots stormed down field, but a 32-yard Vinatieri field goal try on the final play bounced off the right upright, securing a 16–14 Chiefs win.

- October 17 vs. Miami Dolphins:

Dan Marino was injured after throwing an interception returned by Andy Katzenmoyer for a 57-yard touchdown and was replaced by future Patriots backup quarterback Damon Huard. Huard was picked off by Ty Law for a 27-yard touchdown, but from there, the Dolphins clawed back into contention and Huard won the game in the final seconds on a short touchdown toss to Stanley Pritchett and a 31–30 Dolphins win.

- October 24 vs. Denver Broncos:

The Patriots defeated the Broncos for the first time since 1980 after going 0–11 lifetime against John Elway. Both teams rushed for 133 yards while Brian Griese of the Broncos threw for 309 yards compared to a modest 192 passing yards for Drew Bledsoe. Kevin Faulk scored on a 15-yard rushing touchdown as the Patriots rushed to a 24–13 third-quarter lead and sweated out a Broncos rally to win 24–23; the margin of victory turned out to be set by a missed 59-yard field goal try by Jason Elam.

- October 31 at Arizona Cardinals:

The Patriots mopped the floor of Sun Devil Stadium as Bledsoe threw four touchdowns in a 27–3 runaway. The win, however, proved costly, for Ben Coates was held without a catch for the second time that season, a fact Coates took the media during the ensuing bye week to considerable effect. The game marked a fatal turning point to the Patriots season as Coates' public protest soured his relationship with Bledsoe and coach Pete Carroll; the Patriots fell from 6–2 to finish a dismal 8–8; Coates for his part had only sixteen catches the remainder of the season before he was let go and joined the Baltimore Ravens.

- December 5 vs. Dallas Cowboys:

The Patriots entered this game on a three-game losing streak and having never beaten the Cowboys in their history; this was the eighth career meeting between the two clubs. Both Patriot slumps ended as the two defenses kept offense to a premium; Troy Aikman and Drew Bledsoe combined for just 336 passing yards; it was the Patriots ground game that took over to the tune of 116 rushing yards led by Terry Allen's 53 yards and a touchdown in a 13–6 Patriots win. Rookie Kevin Faulk had his most productive game of the season with 36 rushing yards and three catches for 43 yards.

== Final roster ==
New England Patriots 1999 final roster
Quarterbacks: 7 Michael Bishop ^{R}; 11 Drew Bledsoe; 17 John Friesz; Running backs: 22 Terry Allen; 30 Tony Carter FB; 35 Jerry Ellison; 37 Chris Floyd FB; 44 Harold Shaw FB; 27 Lamont Warren; Wide receivers: 82 Vincent Brisby; 80 Troy Brown; 88 Terry Glenn; 84 Shawn Jefferson; 85 Sean Morey ^{R}; 81 Tony Simmons; Tight ends: 86 Mike Bartrum LS; 87 Ben Coates; 83 Rod Rutledge	Offensive linemen: 67 Jason Andersen C; 78 Bruce Armstrong OT; 66 Ed Ellis OT; 64 Derrick Fletcher G ^{R}; 63 Heath Irwin G; 68 Max Lane OT; 77 Zefross Moss OT; 71 Todd Rucci G; 65 Damien Woody C ^{R}; Defensive linemen: 92 Ferric Collons DE; 90 Chad Eaton DT; 93 Bob Kuberski DT; 55 Willie McGinest DE; 98 Brandon Mitchell DE; 74 Chris Sullivan DE; 95 Henry Thomas DT	Linebackers: 54 Tedy Bruschi OLB; 99 Vernon Crawford OLB; 52 Ted Johnson MLB; 59 Andy Katzenmoyer MLB ^{R}; 91 Jeff Kopp OLB; 96 Marc Megna MLB ^{R}; 58 Marty Moore MLB; 53 Chris Slade OLB; Defensive backs: 23 Terry Billups CB; 42 Chris Carter FS; 39 Rico Clark CB; 41 Tony George S ^{R}; 21 Steve Israel CB; 28 Corey Ivy CB ^{UR}; 36 Lawyer Milloy SS; 31 Kato Serwanga CB; 25 Larry Whigham FS; Special teams: 10 Lee Johnson P; 4 Adam Vinatieri K	Reserve lists: 32 J'Juan Cherry CB (IR) ^{R}; 29 Derrick Cullors RB/KR (IR); 47 Robert Edwards RB (NF-Inj.); 33 Kevin Faulk RB/KR (IR) ^{R}; 26 Cory Gilliard S (IR) ^{R}; 34 Tebucky Jones CB (IR); 24 Ty Law CB (IR); -- Devon Smith TE (IR); 94 Greg Spires DE (IR); Practice squad: 1 Tony Hamler WR ^{UR}; 69 Marcus Jenkins G; 62 Garrett Johnson NT ^{UR}; 38 Kelly Malveaux CB; 49 Kerry Taylor TE ^{UR}; 53 active, 9 inactive, 5 practice squad Notations: R: 1999 Rookie; UR: 1999 Undrafted Rookie; Italicized players are not on the 53-man roster.
