= HLHS =

HLHS may refer to:

- Hypoplastic left heart syndrome, a rare congenital heart defect
- Hunters Lane High School, Nashville, Tennessee, United States
- National Hualien Senior High School, a senior high school in Hualien City, Taiwan
