= Hunters Lane High School =

Location
- 1150 Hunters Lane; Nashville, Tennessee 37207; United States; 36.2796°N 86.7541°W

Information
- Type: Comprehensive High School
- Established: 1986 (40 years ago)
- Principal: Susan Kessler
- Faculty: 100
- Teaching staff: 82.46 (FTE)
- Grades: 9-12
- Enrollment: 1,394 (2023–2024)
- Student to teacher ratio: 16.91
- Colors: Royal blue, orange and white
- Athletics: TSSAA
- Mascot: Warriors
- Website: Official Website

Hunters Lane High School (formerly Hunters Lane Comprehensive High School; commonly Hunters Lane, HLHS) is a public school in Nashville, Tennessee, operated by Metropolitan Nashville Public Schools. The school opened in 1986 and had its first graduating class in 1987. It serves approximately 1700 students. In March 2012, the Metro Board of Education dropped the "Comprehensive" title from all its zoned schools to reflect the district's new emphases on smaller learning communities and thematic career academies. As a zoned high school, the school's population is primarily composed of graduates of Madison, Neely's Bend, and Goodlettsville Middle Schools.

== Inception ==
Hunters Lane Comprehensive High School opened in 1986 after closing Goodlettsville High School, Dupont High School, and Madison High School; the school at the time had six feeder schools. Incidentally, the colors for the school's sports teams are orange and royal blue, a combination of the Blue of Goodlettsville High School's Trojans and the Orange of Madison High School's Rams. In its first years, the school played most of its outdoor athletic events at other schools until its playing facilities were complete. Members of school's first graduating class of 347 people wrote the school's current alma mater in AP English Literature and Composition. The 1987 senior class would also vote on the school's nickname and mascot of the "Warrior"; "Wolverine" was the runner-up.

== Programs ==
Hunters Lane is noted for its local, state, national, and international presence in sports and performance arts. Sports teams such as the baseball, softball, football, men's and women's basketball, men's and women's track and field, and men's and women's tennis teams are frequently accepted to tournament play following regular season play. Hunters Lane features an award-winning marching band nicknamed the Sonic Boom Box and an internationally acclaimed Chamber Choir. The band's students of the class of 2014 were all offered full scholarships to Concordia University in Selma, Alabama, after Concordia's band director saw one of Hunters Lane's performances; this started a trend of every band senior receiving a scholarship offer since. Also featured for students are classes in the culinary and vocational arts, digital media design, and emergency medicine. The school maintains a U.S. Army JROTC battalion and an internship program with St. Thomas Hospital. The school's marching band, nicknamed the Human Boom Box has had all of its seniors receive music scholarship offers since 2013. The school formerly featured a Forensic team, a speech and debate club which participated in events such as Student Congress, National Extemporaneous Speaking, and Prose and Poetry Interpretation. The team was a perennial contender for top team in the Metro Forensic League, often placing third behind Antioch and Overton High Schools. The school has since restarted its weekly in-school debate club and interschool competitive debate team.

== International Baccalaureate Programme (IB) ==
In 2000, the school received the approval to become a member of the International Baccalaureate Programme, or IB, an international program which provides advanced education to more intelligent children seeking more of a challenge. In 2004, Hunters Lane saw its first IB class graduate, making Hunters Lane High School the first school in the State of Tennessee to successfully initiate and graduate an IB program class. That same year program expanded to Hillsboro High School and later to Antioch High School in 2014.

The school currently offers IB core courses in English literature, history, biology, two levels of math, world language offerings of Spanish and French, theory of knowledge, and electives in psychology, visual art, and music. All courses are two years in length and available as a full diploma program, the IB core courses plus one elective, or as individual a-la-carte offerings, known as certificate courses.

== Academy model ==
Along with many of its cohort MNPS high schools, Hunters Lane is divided into several career academies. Students enter into the school's Freshman Academy in the 9th grade year and elect to enter one of the upperclassmen thematic career academies for the 10th-12th grade year. Each academy has several elective pathways that students can choose from based on their own interests. Within each academy, students have common core courses in most subjects. The faculty of each academy meet together weekly to discuss student progress and plan interdisciplinary units and academy enrichment activities. All of the career academies are certified as "Model" Academies by the National Career Academy Coalition. The academies are:

Ninth Grade Academy

- The Freshman Academy

Thematic Career Academies

- The Academy of Design and Technology ("The Designers")
- The Academy of Health and Human Services ("The Humanitarians")
- The Academy of International Baccalaureate ("The Humanitarians", this academy shares faculty with Health and Human Services)
- The Academy of Hospitality and Marketing and Business ("The Aficionados and the Executives")

== Notable graduates ==
- Ramon Clay, retired world class sprinter
- Stephen Cochran, country music singer
- Brandon Curry, 2019 Mr. Olympia Champion
- Reggie Grimes, National Football League defensive lineman
- Jadyn Maria, singer
- James Shaw Jr., electrical technician and hero in Nashville Waffle House shooting
