= Kevin Faulk =

American football player and coach (born 1976)

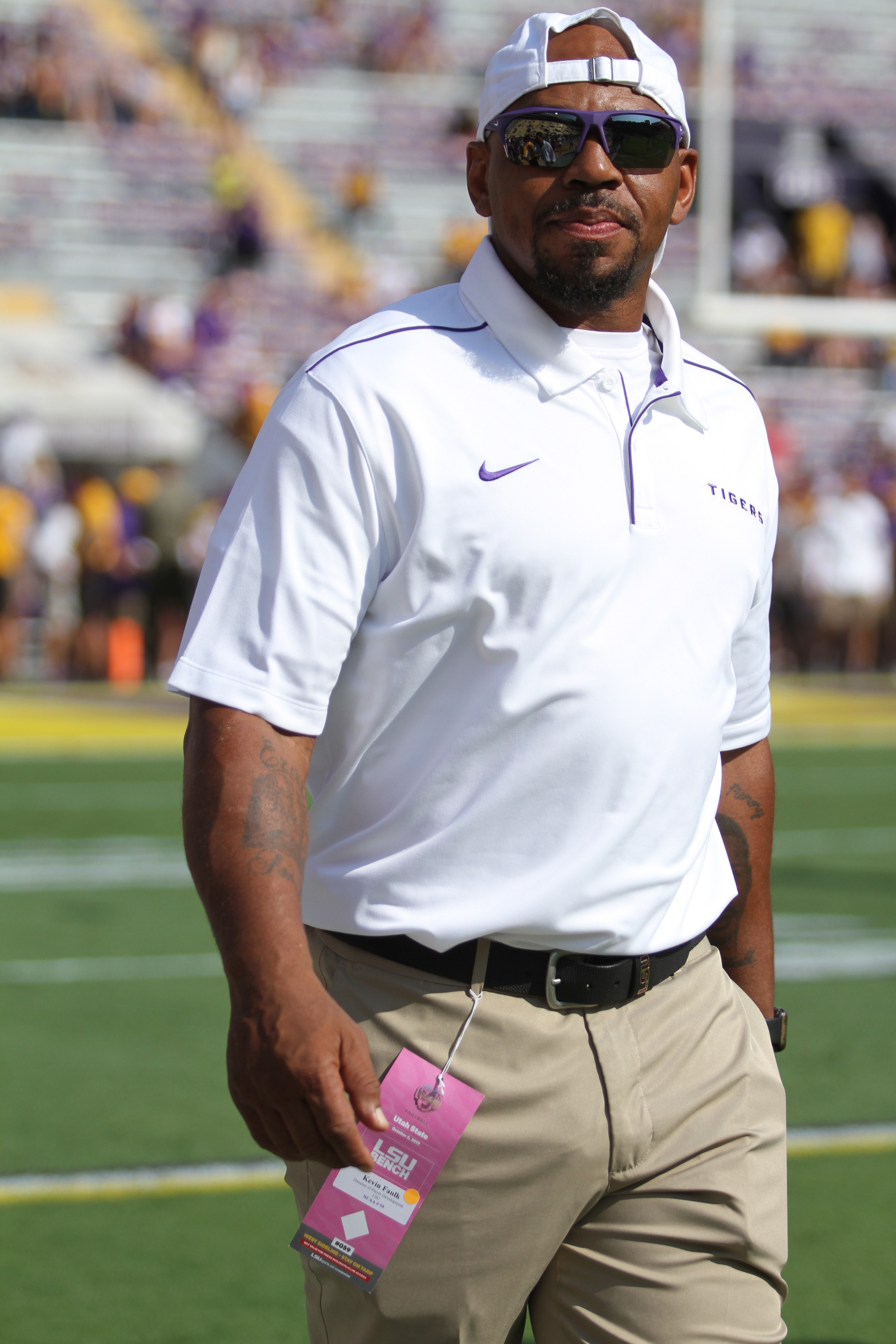
- Faulk at LSU in 2019

Profile
- Position: Running backs coach

Personal information
- Born: June 5, 1976 (age 50); Lafayette, Louisiana, U.S.
- Listed height: 5 ft 8 in (1.73 m)
- Listed weight: 202 lb (92 kg)

Career information
- High school: Carencro (LA)
- College: LSU (1995–1998)
- NFL draft: 1999: 2nd round, 46th overall pick

Career history

Playing
- New England Patriots (1999–2011)

Coaching
- Carencro HS (LA) (2013–2017) Offensive coordinator; LSU (2018–2019) Director of player development; LSU (2020–2021) Running backs coach; New York Giants (2022) Running backs intern

Awards and highlights
- As an assistant coach: College Football Playoff national champion (2019); As a player: 3× Super Bowl champion (XXXVI, XXXVIII, XXXIX); New England Patriots All-2000s Team; New England Patriots 50th Anniversary Team; New England Patriots All-Dynasty Team; New England Patriots Hall of Fame; First-team All-American (1996); Third-team All-American (1997, 1998); 3× First-team All-SEC (1996–1998); SEC Freshman of the Year (1995); Louisiana Sports Hall of Fame

Career NFL statistics
- Rushing attempts: 864
- Rushing yards: 3,607
- Rushing touchdowns: 16
- Receptions: 431
- Receiving yards: 3,701
- Receiving touchdowns: 15
- Stats at Pro Football Reference
- College Football Hall of Fame

Kevin Troy Faulk (born June 5, 1976) is an American former professional football running back who played in the National Football League (NFL) for 13 seasons with the New England Patriots. Faulk played college football for the LSU Tigers, winning SEC Freshman of the Year in 1995 and receiving first-team All-American honors the following season. He was selected by the Patriots in the second round of the 1999 NFL draft.

Faulk held a variety of offensive and special teams roles during his professional career and contributed to the Patriots' first three Super Bowl titles. For his accomplishments in New England, he was inducted to the Patriots Hall of Fame in 2016. After retiring from the NFL, Faulk returned to LSU as an assistant coach from 2018 to 2021. He was inducted to the College Football Hall of Fame in 2022.

== Early life ==
Born in Lafayette, Louisiana, Faulk attended Carencro High School in Carencro, Louisiana, where he helped his team win the 1992 State Championship (Class 5A). In high school, Faulk rushed for 4,877 yards on 603 carries (8.1 yards per carry). He also had 7,612 all-purpose yards and 89 touchdowns. He was twice chosen as Louisiana's Most Valuable Player (Class 5A). He was also given All-American Honors by USA Today and Parade.

== College career ==
Following high school, Faulk attended Louisiana State University, where he immediately became the starting running back for the Tigers as a true freshman in 1995. In 1996, Faulk was voted to the College Football All-America Team by the Associated Press.

On September 7, 1996, in the game against the Houston Cougars, LSU trailed at the end of the third quarter 34–14. Many LSU fans left Tiger Stadium before the game ended in anticipation of defeat. Faulk, however, took over the game in the fourth quarter and rushed for a school record of 246 yards on 21 carries and returned four punts for another 106 yards. The result was an LSU win by one point, 35–34; Houston scored nothing in the fourth quarter of the game.

Faulk ran for 1,144 yards on 205 carries in 1997, scoring 15 touchdowns. He improved on those numbers as a senior in 1998 when he ran for 1,279 yards on 229 carries and scored 12 rushing touchdowns. He added 287 yards receiving and three receiving touchdowns.

Faulk finished his LSU career with 4,557 yards rushing in 41 games, which was second best in SEC history behind Herschel Walker of Georgia (5,259 yards in 34 games). Faulk also finished his career with 6,833 career all-purpose yards and 53 total touchdowns, which tied him for fifth in NCAA history and first in SEC history. His SEC record was surpassed on November 21, 2009, by Tim Tebow of Florida. In 1999, Faulk graduated from LSU with a degree in kinesiology.

Faulk was announced as a 2022 inductee of the College Football Hall of Fame on Jan. 10.

College career statistics*
Season	Team	GP	Rushing				Receiving				Scrimmage		
Season	Team	GP	Att	Yds	Avg	TD	Rec	Yds	Avg	TD	Plays	Yds	TD
1995	LSU	10	174	852	4.9	6	5	86	17.2	1	179	938	7
1996	LSU	11	248	1,282	5.2	13	10	134	13.4	0	258	1,416	13
1997	LSU	9	205	1,144	5.6	15	16	93	5.8	0	221	1,237	15
1998	LSU	11	229	1,279	5.6	12	22	287	13.0	3	251	1,566	15
College totals		41	856	4,557†	5.3	46†	53	600	11.3	4	909	5,157	50†

Notes:

- * Does not include bowl games
- † LSU record

== Professional career ==
=== Pre-draft ===
Pre-draft measurables
Height	Weight	Arm length	Hand span	40-yard dash	10-yard split	20-yard split	20-yard shuttle	Three-cone drill	Vertical jump	Broad jump
5 ft 7 5/8 in (1.72 m)	205 lb (93 kg)	29 3/4 in (0.76 m)	9 1/8 in (0.23 m)	4.57 s	1.61 s	2.62 s	4.09 s	7.14 s	34.0 in (0.86 m)	9 ft 6 in (2.90 m)
All values from NFL Combine

=== New England Patriots (1999–2011) ===
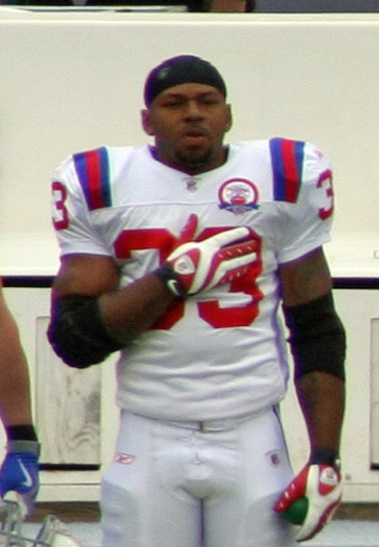
Faulk with the Patriots

Faulk was selected by the New England Patriots in the second round (46th overall) of the 1999 NFL draft.

Dubbed the Patriots' "Swiss Army knife" because of his multitude of tools and versatility, he played a wide variety of roles on the team. Besides his primary position as running back, he also played some as a wide receiver, special teams as a gunner and a return specialist. He was rarely the team's feature back, but was adept at catching the ball, blocking, and running as needed. In 2016, he was inducted into the Patriots Hall of Fame.

==== 1999–2000 seasons ====
Pete Carroll was the head coach of the Patriots in Faulk's rookie season in 1999. As a rookie, Faulk started the first two games of the season at running back before an ankle injury kept him out of the next two games. He returned in Week 5 as a reserve behind starter Terry Allen. He suffered a sprained ankle in Week 14 and was placed on injured reserve on December 14, 1999. In 11 games, Faulk recorded 1,358 all-purpose yards and also returned a kickoff for 95 yards against the New York Jets on November 15. He recorded 227 rushing yards on 27 carries and one touchdown, along with 12 receptions for 98 yards and a touchdown. He added 943 kickoff return yards on 39 returns, as well as 10 punt returns for 90 yards.

In 2000, Faulk shared a starting role with rookie J. R. Redmond, with Faulk starting 9 of 16 games played. He led the team with 570 yards rushing on 164 carries with four rushing touchdowns. He added 51 catches for 465 yards and one touchdown. He was also active on special teams, leading the team with 38 kickoff returns for 816 yards while also returning six punts for 58 yards.

==== 2001–2002 seasons ====
Faulk settled into a reserve role for the 2001 season, behind starter Antowain Smith. He played in 15 games, making one start, and finished second on the team with 169 yards rushing on 41 attempts, with one touchdown. He added 30 receptions for 189 yards and two touchdowns. He also led the team for a third straight season with 33 kickoff returns for 662 yards, while adding four punt returns for 27 yards. On December 22 against the Miami Dolphins, Faulk completed a 23-yard pass to quarterback Tom Brady, his first career pass completion. Faulk and the Patriots would go on to win Super Bowl XXXVI over the St. Louis Rams, who his cousin, fellow running back Marshall Faulk, played for.

In 2002, Faulk finished the regular season with 1,440 all-purpose yards in 15 games, all as a reserve behind Smith. He ran 52 times for 271 yards and two touchdowns, caught 37 passes for 379 yards and three touchdowns, returned 26 kickoffs for 725 yards and two touchdowns, and added 8 punt returns for 65 yards. His seven total touchdowns ranked second on the team.

He also finished second in the NFL in 2002 with a 27.9-yard kickoff return average. That same year, he broke the Patriots' franchise record for total kickoff return yards, which had previously been held by Dave Meggett, who had 2,561 yards on kickoff returns. Also in 2002, Faulk returned two kickoffs for touchdowns, becoming only the second player in Patriots history to return more than one kickoff for a touchdown in a season. One kickoff return was an 86-yard return against the Oakland Raiders on November 17, the other was an 87-yard kickoff return against the New York Jets on December 22. He became the only player in franchise history and the only NFL player in the 2002 season to record multiple touchdowns in three different categories: rushing, receiving, and kick returns.

==== 2003–2004 seasons ====
In 2003, Faulk compiled 1,351 all-purpose yards (including a team-high 1,078 yards from scrimmage) in 15 games, making eight starts in his final season with Smith. He finished the season with career highs of 178 carries for 638 yards as well as 48 receptions for 440 yards. He added 10 kickoff returns for 207 yards and 5 punts returns for 66 yards. Faulk also set a career-high in fumbles in 2003, with four.

Faulk and the Patriots finished the season with a league-best 14–2 record, advancing to Super Bowl XXXVIII. Faulk helped the Patriots to a 32–29 victory in the game over the Carolina Panthers with 42 yards rushing and 19 yards receiving. His longest plays were a 23-yard run in the fourth quarter and a two-point conversion score with 2:51 left in the fourth quarter; the direct snap run was the only score by Faulk in 2003.

In 2004, Faulk played in 11 games (starting one) as a reserve behind starter Corey Dillon. He recorded 255 yards on 54 carries for two touchdowns, 26 receptions for 248 yards and one touchdown, 4 kickoff returns for 73 yards, and 20 punt returns for 133 yards. The Patriots would again post a 14–2 record and won Super Bowl XXXIX over the Philadelphia Eagles.

==== 2005–2007 seasons ====
Faulk played in the first three games of 2005 before suffering a foot injury and not returning until Week 13 in December. In eight games played (two starts), Faulk had 145 yards rushing on 51 carries and 29 catches for 260 yards. He also returned 4 kickoffs for 81 yards.

In 2006, Faulk returned healthy to play in 15 games, making one start. He ran 23 times for 123 yards and one touchdown, and also had 43 receptions for 356 yards and two touchdowns. He returned 17 kickoffs for 364 yards and 31 punts for 330 yards.

On November 26, 2006, in a game against the Chicago Bears, Faulk surpassed Tony Collins on the Patriots' all-time receiving list for a running back with his 262nd catch.

Dillon departed after the 2006 season, leading Faulk to make 8 starts in 16 games played in 2007, alongside second-year running back Laurence Maroney. He was voted an offensive captain for the first time in his career. Faulk rushed for 265 yards on 62 attempts, and added 47 catches for 383 yards and one touchdown. He also returned 2 kickoffs for 47 yards.

==== 2008–2011 seasons ====
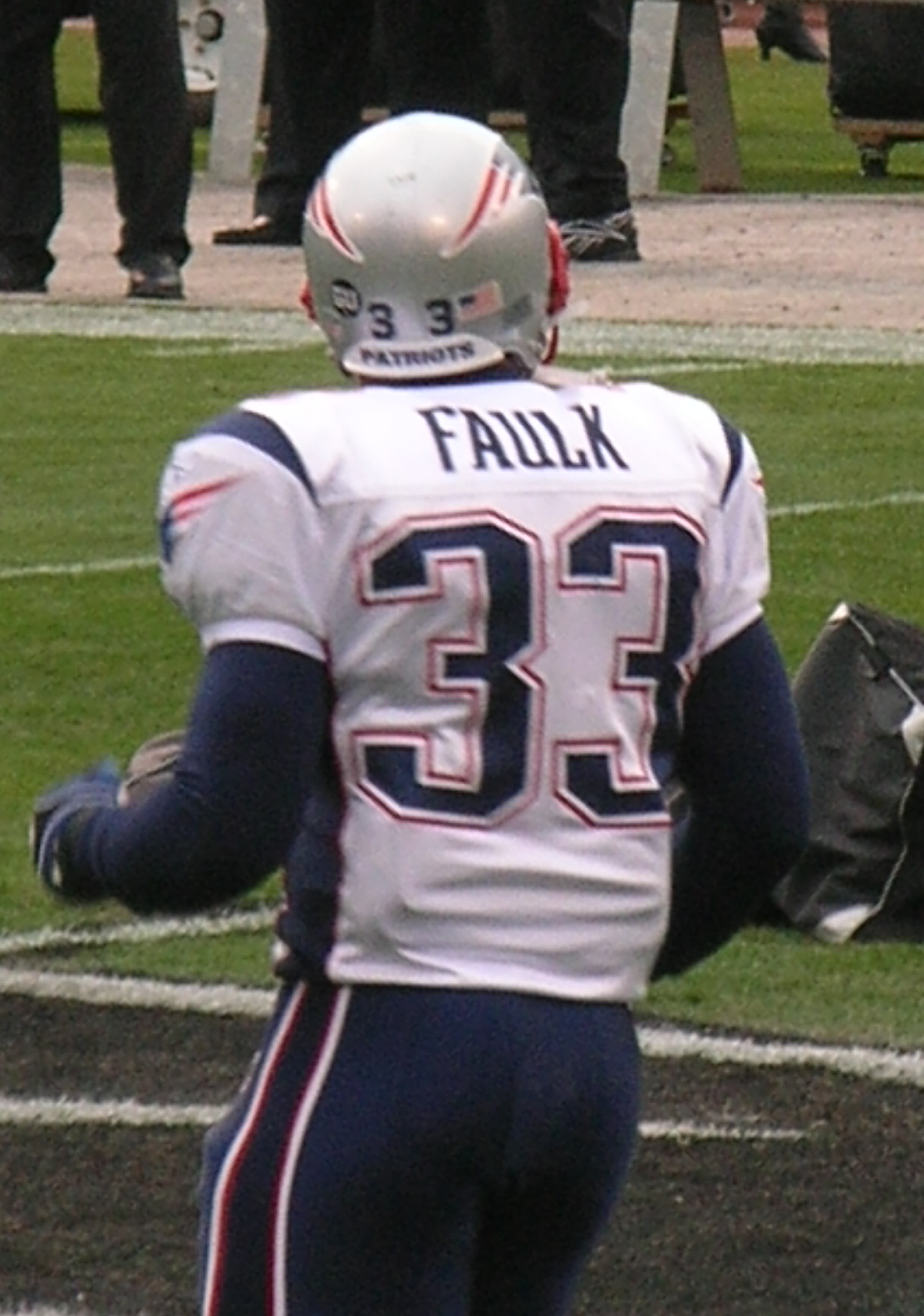
Faulk with the Patriots in 2008

To start the 2008 season, Faulk was given a one-game suspension for violation of the NFL's substance abuse policy. He was found possessing marijuana while attending a Lil Wayne concert in Louisiana in February 2008. Faulk returned in Week 2 and played in every remaining game, making three starts to mark his tenth consecutive season with the Patriots.

He finished the 2008 season with 83 carries for 507 yards and three touchdowns, as well as a career-high 58 receptions for 486 yards and three touchdowns. On special teams, he added 2 kickoff returns for 36 yards and 10 punt returns for 132 yards.

In 2009, Faulk started 7 of 15 games, rushing 62 times for 335 yards and two touchdowns, and making 37 catches for 301 yards and one touchdown. He also returned 6 kickoffs for 144 yards and returned 5 punts for 31 yards. During the season, Faulk became the team's all-time leader in all-purpose yards, amassing 12,140 yards by the end of the season. He also became the 26th running back in NFL history with at least 400 receptions.

Faulk's 2010 season ended in Week 2, when in the fourth quarter of a loss to the Jets, Faulk tore his ACL while being tackled. In two games, both starts, Faulk had eight carries for 45 yards and six catches for 62 yards. He was placed on injured reserve on September 22, 2010, ending his season.

On July 30, 2011, Faulk re-signed with the Patriots. He was placed on the "PUP" list but returned to practice after week six.

== NFL career statistics ==
Year	Team	GP	Rushing					Receiving				
Year	Team	GP	Att	Yds	Avg	Lng	TD	Rec	Yds	Avg	Lng	TD
1999	NE	11	67	227	3.4	43	1	12	98	8.2	19	1
2000	NE	16	164	570	3.5	18	4	51	465	9.1	52	1
2001	NE	15	41	169	4.1	24	1	30	189	6.3	28	2
2002	NE	15	52	271	5.2	45	2	37	379	10.2	36	3
2003	NE	15	178	638	3.6	23	0	48	440	9.2	27	0
2004	NE	11	54	255	4.7	20	2	26	248	9.5	31	1
2005	NE	8	51	145	2.8	13	0	29	260	9.0	23	0
2006	NE	15	25	123	4.9	11	1	43	356	8.3	43	2
2007	NE	16	62	265	4.3	14	0	47	383	8.1	23	1
2008	NE	15	83	507	6.1	41	3	58	486	8.4	22	3
2009	NE	15	62	335	5.4	29	2	37	301	8.1	38	1
2010	NE	2	8	45	5.6	11	0	6	62	10.3	21	1
2011	NE	7	17	57	3.4	9	0	7	34	4.9	18	0
Career		161	864	3,607	4.2	45	16	431	3,701	8.6	52	15

== Retirement ==
On October 9, 2012, Faulk announced his retirement at a ceremony at the Hall at Patriot Place. After retirement, Faulk appeared on NESN every Monday and Friday for a game recap and preview respectively. He also appeared on The Real Pre-Game Show on WEEI-FM 93.7FM every Sunday at 9am for a 1pm kickoff and Noon for a 4:25pm kickoff.

In 2015, Faulk was inducted into the Louisiana Sports Hall of Fame.

On May 18, 2016, Faulk was elected into the Patriots Hall of Fame, beating Raymond Clayborn and Mike Vrabel in a fan vote.

== Coaching career ==
=== High school coach ===
==== Carencro High School ====
Faulk was an assistant coach and offensive coordinator at his alma mater, Carencro High School, from 2013 to 2017.

=== College coach ===
==== LSU ====
On January 24, 2018, Faulk was named the Director of Player Development for the LSU football program and served in that role for two seasons. On February 24, 2020, he was promoted to running backs coach at LSU. He was not retained by LSU after the 2021 season.

=== Professional coach ===
==== New York Giants ====
In August 2022, Faulk was named running backs intern for the New York Giants.

== Personal life ==
Faulk is married and has three children. He is a cousin of NFL Hall of Fame running back Marshall Faulk. and former NFL player Trev Faulk.

On September 14, 2021, LSU released a statement that Faulk's 19-year-old daughter Kevione Faulk had died from an undisclosed cause. Kevione was a student staff member for the LSU football team. On December 6, 2025, Faulk's other daughter, Tanasha, died unexpectedly in Lafayette, Louisiana four years after her sister's death.

== See also ==
- LSU Tigers football statistical leaders
