= Reggie Grimes II =

American football player (born 2002)

No. 14 – Memphis Tigers
- Position: Defensive end
- Class: Redshirt Junior

Personal information
- Born: May 6, 2002 (age 24)
- Listed height: 6 ft 4 in (1.93 m)
- Listed weight: 282 lb (128 kg)

Career information
- High school: Ravenwood (Brentwood, Tennessee)
- College: Oklahoma (2020–2023); Memphis (2024–present)
- Stats at ESPN

Reggie Grimes II (born May 6, 2002) is an American college football defensive end for the Memphis Tigers. He previously played for the Oklahoma Sooners.

== Early life ==
Grimes grew up in Antioch, Tennessee and initially attended Mount Juliet High School. He transferred to Ravenwood High School prior to his senior year after his father was hired to teach and coach football at the school. Grimes was rated a five-star recruit and committed to play college football at Oklahoma over offers from Alabama, Florida State, South Carolina, Tennessee and Vanderbilt.

== College career ==
Grimes played in eight games during his freshman season at Oklahoma and made six tackles with one sack. He played in all 12 of the Sooners' games with five starts as a sophomore and finished the season with 18 tackles with two sacks and two forced fumbles. Grimes was named a starter at defensive end entering his junior season.

On December 4, 2023, Grimes announced that he would be entering the NCAA transfer portal.

== Personal life ==
Grimes' father, Reggie Grimes, played defensive tackle at Alabama.
