= Carencro High School =

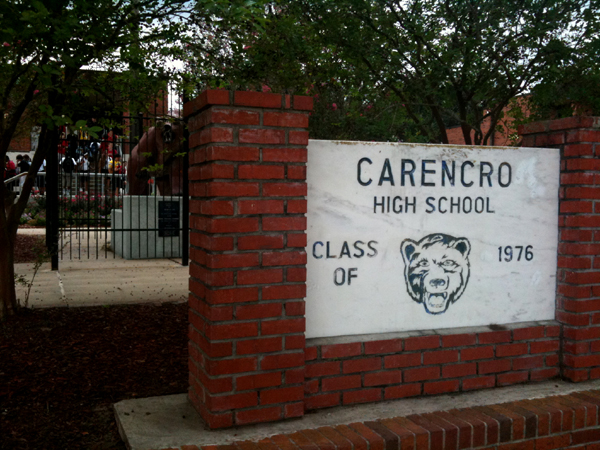

Location
- 721 West Butcher Switch Rd. Lafayette, LA 70507; Louisiana; United States; 30°17′13″N 92°2′25″W

Information
- Established: 1969
- School board: Lafayette Parish Public High Schools
- School district: Lafayette Parish School System
- Principal: Vanessa Knott
- Grades: 9-12
- Enrollment: 1,243 (2023-2024)
- Colors: Navy and gold
- Mascot: Golden Bear
- Team name: Bears and Lady Bears
- School Hours: 7:00 AM to 2:35PM
- Website: www.lpssonline.com/schools/carencro

Carencro High School is a Lafayette Parish high school located in Lafayette, Louisiana, United States. Carencro High School is one of six Lafayette Parish Public High Schools. Geographically, the school is located approximately 3.5 miles north of Interstate 10 and approximately one mile west of Interstate 49.

== School history ==
Carencro High School started as Carencro School in 1874, then moved to what is now Carencro Middle School. The present-day Carencro High School began construction in 1969. Today, the main buildings include Building 1 (Office & Cafeteria), Building 2, Building 3 (Little Theater, Band, & Chorus), Building 4 (Agriculture/Home Economics), Building 5 (known as Boys' Gym), Building 6 (known as Girls' Gym), Building 7, and Building 8 (portable classrooms).

== Feeder schools ==
Students that attend Carencro High School come from several different feeder schools: Acadian Middle, Carencro Middle, L.J. Alleman Middle, N.P. Moss Middle, Paul Breaux Middle, Scott Middle, Carencro Catholic, Immaculate Heart, Stem Magnet Academy, and St. Leo Seton.

== Athletics ==
Carencro High athletics competes in the LHSAA.

Carencro High School is home to many sports organizations including: Baseball, Basketball, Bowling, Cross Country, Football, Golf, Soccer, Softball, Swimming, Tennis, Track & Field, Volleyball, and Wrestling.

=== Championships ===
Football championships

- (2) State Championships: 1992 & 2020

== Notable alumni ==
- Marc Broussard, American singer/songwriter.
- Kevin Faulk, retired New England Patriots running back and three time Super Bowl Champion (2001, 2003, 2004)
- Ron Guidry, former MLB player and MLB Hall of Fame inductee. (New York Yankees)
- Wade Richey, San Francisco 49ers, San Diego Charges, & Baltimore Ravens kicker
