= Tony Carter (running back) =

American football player (born 1972)

No. 30, 37, 39
- Position: Fullback

Personal information
- Born: August 23, 1972 (age 54); Columbus, Ohio, U.S.
- Listed height: 6 ft 0 in (1.83 m)
- Listed weight: 235 lb (107 kg)

Career information
- High school: South (Columbus)
- College: Minnesota
- NFL draft: 1994: undrafted

Career history
- Chicago Bears (1994–1997); New England Patriots (1998–2000); Denver Broncos (2001); Green Bay Packers (2002)

Career NFL statistics
- Rushing yards: 256
- Rushing average: 3.4
- Total touchdowns: 3
- Stats at Pro Football Reference

Antonio Marcus Carter (born August 23, 1972) is an American former professional football player who was a running back in the National Football League (NFL). He played nine seasons for the Chicago Bears, New England Patriots, Denver Broncos, and Green Bay Packers. He played college football for the Minnesota Golden Gophers.

== NFL career statistics ==
Legend
| **Bold** | Career high |

=== Regular season ===
| Year | Team | Games | | Rushing | | | | | Receiving | | | | |
| Year | Team | GP | GS | Att | Yds | Avg | Lng | TD | Rec | Yds | Avg | Lng | TD |
|---|---|---|---|---|---|---|---|---|---|---|---|---|---|
| 1994 | CHI | 14 | 0 | 0 | 0 | 0.0 | 0 | 0 | 1 | 24 | **24.0** | 24 | 0 |
| 1995 | CHI | 16 | 11 | 10 | 34 | 3.4 | 7 | 0 | 40 | **329** | 8.2 | 27 | **1** |
| 1996 | CHI | 16 | 11 | 11 | 43 | 3.9 | **23** | 0 | **41** | 233 | 5.7 | 29 | 0 |
| 1997 | CHI | 16 | 10 | 9 | 56 | **6.2** | 16 | 0 | 24 | 152 | 6.3 | 19 | 0 |
| 1998 | NWE | 11 | 7 | 2 | 3 | 1.5 | 3 | 0 | 18 | 166 | 9.2 | **49** | 0 |
| 1999 | NWE | 16 | 14 | 6 | 26 | 4.3 | 9 | 0 | 20 | 108 | 5.4 | 20 | 0 |
| 2000 | NWE | 16 | 6 | **37** | **90** | 2.4 | 9 | **2** | 9 | 73 | 8.1 | 21 | 0 |
| 2001 | DEN | 16 | 6 | 1 | 4 | 4.0 | 4 | 0 | 11 | 83 | 7.5 | 17 | 0 |
| 2002 | GNB | 12 | 0 | 0 | 0 | 0.0 | 0 | 0 | 0 | 0 | 0.0 | 0 | 0 |
| | | 133 | 65 | 76 | 256 | 3.4 | 23 | 2 | 164 | 1,168 | 7.1 | 49 | 1 |

=== Playoffs ===
| Year | Team | Games | | Rushing | | | | | Receiving | | | | |
| Year | Team | GP | GS | Att | Yds | Avg | Lng | TD | Rec | Yds | Avg | Lng | TD |
|---|---|---|---|---|---|---|---|---|---|---|---|---|---|
| 1994 | CHI | 2 | 0 | **1** | 0 | 0.0 | 0 | 0 | 1 | **16** | **16.0** | **16** | 0 |
| 1998 | NWE | 1 | 1 | **1** | **3** | **3.0** | **3** | 0 | **2** | 3 | 1.5 | 3 | 0 |
| | | 3 | 1 | 2 | 3 | 1.5 | 3 | 0 | 3 | 19 | 6.3 | 16 | 0 |
