= Ravenwood High School =

Location
- 1724 Wilson Pike; Brentwood, Tennessee 37027; United States; 35°57′28″N 86°46′04″W

Information
- Type: Public
- Established: 2002
- School district: Williamson County Schools
- Principal: Patrick Boyd
- Teaching staff: 98.90 (on an FTE basis)
- Grades: 9–12
- Enrollment: 1,950 (2023–2024)
- Student to teacher ratio: 19.72
- Colors: Red; Black; Gold
- Athletics: color guard, football, soccer, track/crosscountry, swimming, flag football, wrestling, gymnastics, dance, marching band, cheer, golf, lacrosse, tennis, baseball, volleyball, badminton, bowling, basketball, ice hockey, softball
- Team name: Raptors
- National ranking: 247 nationally ranked
- ACT average: 30
- Feeder schools: Woodland Middle School; Sunset Middle School
- Website: rhs.wcs.edu

Ravenwood High School is a public high school located in Brentwood, Tennessee, which serves the eastern part of Williamson County.

Opened in 2002, the $24.5 million facility, designed by architect Charlie Johnson, grew its student body, beginning with 540 students in grades nine and ten, 32 teachers, and 7 staff members. Currently enrolling approximately 2,000 students, Ravenwood aims "to become a model of successful community collaboration with the purpose of developing all learners to be able to work, learn and lead in the 21st century." The school colors are red, black, and gold. The mascot is the Raptor, a bird of prey represented by the Red Tail Hawk. Ravenwood High School was ranked in Newsweek magazine's list of the top 1,000 public schools in the United States in 2011.

== Academics ==
Most students at Ravenwood take four academic classes, two electives, one directed study, and a lunch/advocate period. Credits are distributed along a fairly standard path, with most students taking English, mathematics, foreign language, science, and social studies. One year and a half of physical education is also required. The standard high school diploma requires twenty-two credits. In addition, two honors diplomas are offered, the Williamson County Honors Diploma and the Ravenwood Honors Diploma. Ravenwood ranks students using weighted GPA. Ravenwood also offers Advanced Placement (AP) courses.

Ravenwood also has a Media Center with multiple computers and labs for students and faculty to use as well as a library. The Ravenwood Media Center library holds over 16,000 online resources, books, magazines, reference works, audio-visual materials and equipment. Resources are remotely accessible to students and teachers.

== Notable alumni ==
- Chris Parson, quarterback for the Austin Peay Governors
- Jonathan Woodard, former NFL defensive end
- Chris Rowland, wide receiver for the DC Defenders
- Van Jefferson, wide receiver for the Tennessee Titans
- Reggie Grimes II, Defensive End for the Memphis Tigers
- Graham Barton, center for the Tampa Bay Buccaneers
- Junior Colson, linebacker for the Los Angeles Chargers
- Jake Briningstool, tight end for the Kansas City Chiefs
