= Chad Eaton =

American football player (born 1972)

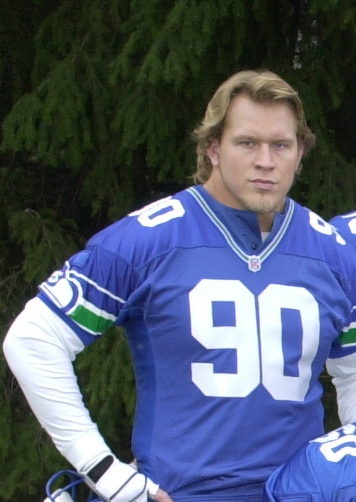
- Eaton with the Seattle Seahawks in 2002

No. 90, 99
- Position: Defensive tackle

Personal information
- Born: April 6, 1972 (age 54); Exeter, New Hampshire, U.S.
- Listed height: 6 ft 5 in (1.96 m)
- Listed weight: 303 lb (137 kg)

Career information
- High school: Rogers (Puyallup, Washington)
- College: Washington State
- NFL draft: 1995: 7th round, 241st overall pick

Career history
- Arizona Cardinals (1995)*; New York Jets (1995)*; Cleveland Browns (1995); New England Patriots (1996–2000); Seattle Seahawks (2001–2003); Dallas Cowboys (2004)
- * Offseason or practice squad member only

Awards and highlights
- Third-team All-American (1994); Morris Trophy (1994); First-team All-Pac-10 (1994); Second-team All-Pac-10 (1993)

Career NFL statistics
- Tackles: 383
- Sacks: 15.5
- Fumble recoveries: 7
- Stats at Pro Football Reference

Chad Everett Eaton (born April 6, 1972) is an American former professional football player who was a defensive tackle in the National Football League (NFL) for the Cleveland Browns, New England Patriots, Seattle Seahawks, and Dallas Cowboys. He played college football for the Washington State Cougars.

== Early life ==
Eaton attended Governor John R. Rogers High School, where he was a two-way lineman. As a senior, he was an All-State selection and named the Prep Lineman Of The Year by the Washington State Sportswriter Association.

He accepted a football scholarship from Washington State University, but didn't play in his first year because of failing to meet the requirements of Proposition 48.

As a sophomore, he was a backup at defensive tackle, totaling 15 tackles and one sack. As a junior, he became a starter at defensive tackle, making 62 tackles, 6 sacks, 2 fumble recoveries and one pass defensed.

As a senior, he recorded 69 tackles, 4.5 sacks, 2 passes defensed, 2 blocked kicks and received the Morris Trophy as the best offensive and defensive lineman in the conference. He finished his career with 23 starts in 35 games, 146 tackles (104 solo), 11.5 sacks and 3 fumble recoveries.

== Professional career ==
=== Arizona Cardinals ===
Eaton was selected by the Arizona Cardinals in the seventh round (241st overall) of the 1995 NFL draft. He was waived on August 14.

=== New York Jets ===
On August 16, 1995, he signed with the New York Jets and was released on August 26.

=== Cleveland Browns ===
On September 28, 1995, he was signed to the Cleveland Browns' practice squad. He was promoted to the active roster for the last two games of the season, although he didn't play after being declared inactive. In 1996, the Browns moved to Baltimore and were renamed as the Ravens. He was cut on August 19.

=== New England Patriots ===
On August 27, 1996, he was signed by the New England Patriots. On November 28, he was promoted to the active roster for the final four games of the season and 3 playoff games. He had 4 tackles, one sack and 2 passes defensed. He added 3 tackles and half a sack in the post season.

In 1997, he was a reserve player until earning a start in the season finale against the Miami Dolphins. He finished with 21 tackles, 3 passes defensed and one sack.

In 1998, he earned the starting nose tackle job, posting 69 tackles (ninth on the team), 6 sacks (second on the team), 3 fumble recoveries, 4 passes defensed and one forced fumble. He also received AFC Defensive Player of the Week honors against the Pittsburgh Steelers, after sacking quarterback Kordell Stewart three times and forcing a fumble that was recovered for a touchdown.

In 1999, he recorded 53 tackles, 3 sacks, 3 fumble recoveries (led the team) and one forced fumble.

In 2000, he registered 78 tackles, 3 sacks, 3 passes defensed and one forced fumble. Against the Buffalo Bills he earned special teams player of the week after blocking 2 field goals, which included the potential game-winner in overtime. He was declared inactive in 2 games with a leg injury.

=== Seattle Seahawks ===
On March 9, 2001, he was signed as a free agent by the Seattle Seahawks to a four-year deal worth $10.7 million and was team up with defensive tackle John Randle who was another free agent signing. He finished with 57 tackles (led the defensive linemen), one sack, 2 passes defensed, one forced fumble and one fumble recovery.

In 2002, he registered 73 tackles (led the defensive linemen), one sack, 3 passes defensed and 3 fumble recoveries (led the team).

On August 12, 2003, he underwent surgery on his right knee. On August 29, he was placed on the injured reserve list. On September 3, he had an emergency knee surgery to remove an infection. He was released on February 27, 2004, after not being able to recover from his previous right knee surgeries.

=== Dallas Cowboys ===
On August 25, 2004, he was signed by the Dallas Cowboys as a free agent to a one-year contract worth $660,000, to be a run specialist. He started the season opener against the Minnesota Vikings in place of a suspended Leonardo Carson. He would be a backup for the next 5 contests, totaling 10 tackles and one quarterback pressure. He was cut on October 30.

== NFL career statistics ==
Legend
	Led the league
**Bold**	Career high

=== Regular season ===
Year	Team	Games		Tackles				Interceptions				Fumbles			
Year	Team	GP	GS	Comb	Solo	Ast	Sck	Int	Yds	TD	Lng	FF	FR	Yds	TD
1996	NWE	4	0	4	3	1	1.0	0	0	0	0	0	0	0	0
1997	NWE	16	1	21	13	8	1.0	0	0	0	0	0	0	0	0
1998	NWE	15	14	**80**	49	**31**	**6.0**	0	0	0	0	1	1	2	0
1999	NWE	16	16	56	38	18	3.0	0	0	0	0	**2**	**3**	**53**	**1**
2000	NWE	14	13	78	**59**	19	2.5	0	0	0	0	**2**	0	0	0
2001	SEA	16	16	57	44	13	1.0	0	0	0	0	1	1	0	0
2002	SEA	16	16	73	48	25	1.0	0	0	0	0	0	2	1	**1**
2004	DAL	6	1	14	9	5	0.0	0	0	0	0	0	0	0	0
		103	77	383	263	120	15.5	0	0	0	0	6	7	56	2

=== Playoffs ===
Year	Team	Games		Tackles				Interceptions				Fumbles			
Year	Team	GP	GS	Comb	Solo	Ast	Sck	Int	Yds	TD	Lng	FF	FR	Yds	TD
1996	NWE	3	0	**2**	**2**	0	**0.5**	0	0	0	0	0	0	0	0
1997	NWE	2	0	**2**	**2**	0	0.0	0	0	0	0	0	0	0	0
1998	NWE	1	1	**2**	**2**	0	0.0	0	0	0	0	0	0	0	0
		6	1	6	6	0	0.5	0	0	0	0	0	0	0	0

== Personal life ==
Eaton was arrested in Monroe, Washington on Saturday, July 21, 2007, on domestic violence charges.

In 2011, he was hired as the defensive line coach at Central State University. In a November, 2011, interview with the Dayton Daily News, Eaton claimed that Bill Belichick paid him to start fights with other players during practice.

Eaton is now featured as a regular guest host on Seattle, Washington radio station 99.9 FM KISW's BJ SHEA Morning Experience. In a segment called "Hawk-Talk" where he regularly gives predictions and post game analysis of the Seattle Seahawks performance. His segment is each Monday morning usually in the 9 o'clock hour.
