= Henry Thomas (American football) =

American football player (born 1965)

No. 97, 98, 95
- Position: Defensive tackle

Personal information
- Born: January 12, 1965 (age 61); Houston, Texas, U.S.
- Listed height: 6 ft 2 in (1.88 m)
- Listed weight: 277 lb (126 kg)

Career information
- High school: Eisenhower (Houston)
- College: LSU (1983–1986)
- NFL draft: 1987: 3rd round, 72nd overall pick

Career history
- Minnesota Vikings (1987–1994); Detroit Lions (1995–1996); New England Patriots (1997–2000)

Awards and highlights
- Second-team All-Pro (1993); 2× Pro Bowl (1991, 1992); 50 Greatest Vikings; Third-team All-American (1986); First-team All-SEC (1986)

Career NFL statistics
- Sacks: 93.5
- Safeties: 1
- Tackles: 1,006
- Interceptions: 4
- Forced fumbles: 19
- Fumble recoveries: 14
- Total touchdowns: 3
- Stats at Pro Football Reference

Henry Lee Thomas Jr. (born January 12, 1965) is an American former professional football player. He played as a defensive tackle in the National Football League (NFL). His nickname was "Hardware Hank."

== Early life and college ==
Thomas was born in Houston, Texas. He was a star athlete at Eisenhower High School there.

He attended Louisiana State University, where he played college football for its football team.

== Professional career ==
Thomas was selected by the Minnesota Vikings in the third round of the 1987 NFL draft. He played for the Vikings for the first eight seasons of his career. Thomas twice was selected to the Pro Bowl. He joined the Detroit Lions in 1995, where he played two seasons. He subsequently played four seasons with the New England Patriots and retired from the game.

During his entire NFL career, he was responsible for 93.5 sacks and over 800 tackles.

He has been an intern coach for the Indianapolis Colts and Minnesota Vikings.

== NFL career statistics ==
Legend
	Led the league
**Bold**	Career high

=== Regular season ===
Year	Team	Games		Tackles				Interceptions				Fumbles			
Year	Team	GP	GS	Comb	Solo	Ast	Sck	Int	Yds	TD	Lng	FF	FR	Yds	TD
1987	MIN	12	11	81	-	-	2.5	**1**	0	0	0	0	1	0	0
1988	MIN	15	15	80	-	-	6.0	**1**	7	0	7	**4**	1	2	**1**
1989	MIN	14	14	94	-	-	9.0	0	0	0	0	3	**3**	**37**	**1**
1990	MIN	**16**	**16**	**109**	-	-	8.5	0	0	0	0	1	1	0	0
1991	MIN	**16**	15	100	-	-	8.0	0	0	0	0	0	1	0	0
1992	MIN	**16**	**16**	69	-	-	6.0	0	0	0	0	0	0	0	0
1993	MIN	13	13	66	-	-	9.0	0	0	0	0	1	0	0	0
1994	MIN	**16**	**16**	55	41	14	7.0	0	0	0	0	2	1	0	0
1995	DET	**16**	**16**	68	**45**	23	**10.5**	0	0	0	0	2	2	0	0
1996	DET	15	15	47	31	16	6.0	0	0	0	0	2	1	0	0
1997	NWE	**16**	**16**	69	44	**25**	7.0	0	0	0	0	2	1	0	0
1998	NWE	**16**	15	64	42	22	6.5	**1**	**24**	**1**	**24**	2	1	0	0
1999	NWE	**16**	**16**	62	42	20	3.0	0	0	0	0	0	0	0	0
2000	NWE	**16**	5	42	24	18	4.5	**1**	16	0	16	0	1	0	0
Career		213	199	1,006	269	138	93.5	4	47	1	24	19	14	39	2
