= Andy Wasynczuk =

American lecturer (born 1957)

Andrew Wasynczuk (born February 18, 1957, in Chicago, Illinois) is a senior lecturer of business administration for Harvard Business School.

== Biography ==
He served as chief operating officer and senior vice president for the New England Patriots of the National Football League, where he oversaw Foxboro Stadium and the building of its successor Gillette Stadium, while also helping to administer the NFL salary cap for the team in the 1990s.

In 1979, Wasynczuk graduated from Case Western Reserve University with bachelor's and master's degrees in electrical engineering, earning both degrees in four years. After that, Wasynczuk earned his MBA from Harvard Business School in 1983 before working as a consultant at Bain & Company, where he met Boston businessman Jonathan Kraft. In January 1989, he was hired by Kraft's father, then-Foxboro Stadium owner Robert Kraft, as the chief operating officer of Foxboro Stadium Associates.

When Robert Kraft purchased the Patriots in 1994, Wasynczuk, who was named the team's vice president of business operations, was called upon by Kraft to negotiate high-profile player contracts and develop salary cap management strategies. In 1999, he was promoted to chief operating officer/senior vice president while his responsibilities were expanded to include the oversight for the construction of CMGI Field, which opened in 2002, although he did not retain salary cap responsibilities upon the hiring of head coach Bill Belichick and player personnel director Scott Pioli in 2000.

In February 2005, Wasynczuk left the Patriots to return to Harvard Business School as a business administration lecturer, while also remaining a consultant for The Kraft Group.
