= Reggie Grimes =

American football player (born 1976)

No. 97, 98
- Position: Defensive tackle

Personal information
- Born: November 7, 1976 (age 49); Nashville, Tennessee, U.S.
- Listed height: 6 ft 4 in (1.93 m)
- Listed weight: 300 lb (136 kg)

Career information
- High school: Hunters Lane (Nashville)
- College: Alabama
- NFL draft: 2000: undrafted

Career history
- New England Patriots (2000); Seattle Seahawks (2002)*; Chicago Bears (2002)*; Berlin Thunder (2003); Atlanta Falcons (2003–2004)*
- * Offseason or practice squad member only
- Stats at Pro Football Reference

Reginald Dewayne Grimes (born November 7, 1976) is an American former professional football player who was a defensive tackle in the National Football League (NFL). He briefly played for the New England Patriots in 2000. Grimes played college football for the Alabama Crimson Tide.

His son, also named Reggie, is the highest ranked recruit from Tennessee and also the 4th highest ranked recruit at defensive end in the nation from the Class of 2020.
