= Brandon Mitchell (defensive end) =

American football player (born 1975)

No. 98, 96, 97
- Position: Defensive end

Personal information
- Born: June 19, 1975 (age 51); Abbeville, Louisiana, U.S.
- Listed height: 6 ft 3 in (1.91 m)
- Listed weight: 290 lb (132 kg)

Career information
- High school: Abbeville
- College: Texas A&M
- NFL draft: 1997: 2nd round, 59th overall pick

Career history
- New England Patriots (1997–2001); Seattle Seahawks (2002–2004); Atlanta Falcons (2005)*
- * Offseason or practice squad member only

Awards and highlights
- Super Bowl champion (XXXVI); First-team All-American (1995); 2× First-team All-SWC (1994, 1995)

Career NFL statistics
- Tackles: 198
- Sacks: 11
- Fumble recoveries: 1
- Stats at Pro Football Reference

Brandon Mitchell (June 19, 1975) is an American former professional football player for nine seasons in the National Football League (NFL). He played college football for the Texas A&M Aggies and was selected by the New England Patriots as a defensive tackle in the second round of the 1997 NFL draft with the 59th overall pick. He started in Super Bowl XXXVI for the Patriots and played at defensive end.

His brother Jason Mitchell was a member of New York Giants. His cousin, Anthony Levine, played for the NFL's Baltimore Ravens from 2012 until his retirement in 2022.

== NFL career statistics ==
Legend
	Won the Super Bowl
**Bold**	Career high

=== Regular season ===
Year	Team	Games		Tackles				Interceptions				Fumbles			
Year	Team	GP	GS	Comb	Solo	Ast	Sck	Int	Yds	TD	Lng	FF	FR	Yds	TD
1997	NE	12	0	9	6	3	0.0	0	0	0	0	0	0	0	0
1998	NE	7	1	21	14	7	2.0	0	0	0	0	0	0	0	0
1999	NE	16	16	**48**	23	**25**	**3.0**	0	0	0	0	0	**1**	0	0
2000	NE	11	9	29	13	16	0.0	0	0	0	0	0	0	0	0
2001	NE	16	11	43	**26**	17	1.0	0	0	0	0	0	0	0	0
2002	SEA	5	2	8	5	3	1.0	0	0	0	0	0	0	0	0
2003	SEA	14	6	24	20	4	**3.0**	0	0	0	0	**1**	0	0	0
2004	SEA	15	0	16	13	3	1.0	0	0	0	0	0	0	0	0
		96	45	198	120	78	11.0	0	0	0	0	1	1	0	0

=== Playoffs ===
Year	Team	Games		Tackles				Interceptions				Fumbles			
Year	Team	GP	GS	Comb	Solo	Ast	Sck	Int	Yds	TD	Lng	FF	FR	Yds	TD
1997	NE	2	0	0	0	0	0.0	0	0	0	0	0	0	0	0
2001	NE	3	3	**2**	1	**1**	0.0	0	0	0	0	0	0	0	0
2003	SEA	1	1	**2**	**2**	0	0.0	0	0	0	0	0	0	0	0
2004	SEA	1	1	1	1	0	0.0	0	0	0	0	0	0	0	0
		7	5	5	4	1	0.0	0	0	0	0	0	0	0	0
