= Shockmain Davis =

American football player (born 1977)

No. 84
- Position: Wide receiver

Personal information
- Born: August 20, 1977 (age 49); Port Arthur, Texas, U.S.
- Listed height: 6 ft 0 in (1.83 m)
- Listed weight: 205 lb (93 kg)

Career information
- High school: Lincoln (Port Arthur)
- College: Angelo State
- NFL draft: 2000: undrafted

Career history
- New England Patriots (2000); Seattle Seahawks (2002)*; Beaumont Drillers (2003, 2005); Rhein Fire (2004); Green Bay Packers (2004); Winnipeg Blue Bombers (2006); Toronto Argonauts (2006)
- * Offseason or practice squad member only

Career NFL statistics
- Games played: 12
- Receptions: 2
- Receiving yards: 12
- Stats at Pro Football Reference

Shockmain Nastase Davis (born August 20, 1977) is an American former professional football player who was a wide receiver in the National Football League (NFL) and Canadian Football League (CFL). He played college football for the Angelo State Rams.

== Professional career ==
Davis was originally signed by the New England Patriots of the National Football League (NFL) in 2000 as an undrafted free agent. He played twelve games for the Patriots that year. In 2002, he was signed by the Seattle Seahawks and made it to the final cuts, then was released. In 2003, Davis signed with the Toronto Argonauts in the CFL where he suffered a broken leg in training camp. Davis also had stints in the NIFL for the Beaumont Drillers. In 2004, Davis was signed by the Green Bay Packers and was allocated by the Packers to play in NFL Europe. Davis made the all NFL Europe team as a kick returner with 19 returns for 571 yards, averaging 30.05 yards per return and a long of 93 yards along with two touchdowns. He was released by the Packers after suffering another broken leg in 2005. Later, Shockmain was signed by the Winnipeg Blue Bombers and then was traded to the Toronto Argonauts, where he suffered a torn ACL in a game against the Montreal Alouettes. Shockmain retired from professional football shortly after the ACL injury.

He last played for the Toronto Argonauts of the Canadian Football League.
