= Metropolitan Nashville Public Schools =

Public school district in Nashville, Tennessee, United States

Metro Nashville Public Schools

Location
- Nashville, Tennessee United States

District information
- Type: Public school
- Grades: PK–12
- Established: 1855; 171 years ago
- Superintendent: Dr. Adrienne Battle
- NCES District ID: 4703180

Students and staff
- Students: 80,494 (2020–21)
- Teachers: 5,245.50 (FTE)
- Staff: 4,227
- Student–teacher ratio: 15.35

Other information
- Website: www.mnps.org

Metro Nashville Public Schools (MNPS) is a school district that serves the city of Nashville, Tennessee and Davidson County. As of the 2020–21 school year more than 80,000 students were enrolled in the district's 162 schools.

Schools in the MNPS district include, but not limited too, schools like, MEIGS Magnet Middle School, Rose Park Math and Science Magnet Middle School, Hume Fogg Magnet High School, and MLK Magnet High School.

== History ==
Metro Nashville Public Schools traces its roots to 1855, when Hume School opened its doors. In 1963, Metropolitan Nashville Public Schools officially formed with the unification of Nashville and Davidson County schools. The district today includes 155 schools, offering instruction from Pre-Kindergarten through 12th grade, with high schools also offering college-level credits.

== Academics ==
More than 99 percent of MNPS teachers meet federal standards in at least one subject, with 98.90 percent of classes taught by a highly qualified instructor. The average teacher experience is 13.0 years at the elementary level, 11.5 years at the middle school level, and 14.0 years at the high school level. A total of 39.83 percent of MNPS teachers have a bachelor's degree, 36.67 percent have a master's degree, 18.81 percent have Master's plus, and 4.6 percent have a doctorate degree.

Current enrollment reflects a diverse spectrum of backgrounds. Students represent more than 100 countries and speak languages from more than 100 language groups. MNPS currently has the International Baccalaureate programs in nine schools. Also of note are the magnet schools Hume-Fogg, Nashville School of the Arts, and Martin Luther King.

== Administration ==
=== Board of education ===
The Board of Education is composed of nine elected members, each serving 4-year terms, and each coming from one of the nine districts in the city. The current board members are:

- District 1: Dr. Sharon Gentry
- District 2: Rachael Anne Elrod, Vice Chair
- District 3: Emily Masters
- District 4: John Little
- District 5: Christiane Buggs, Chair
- District 6: Fran Bush
- District 7: Freda Player-Peters
- District 8: Gini Pupo-Walker
- District 9: Abigail Tyler

=== Director of Schools ===
The Board of Education hires a Director of Schools to oversee daily operations of the schools in Nashville.

As of 2019, Dr. Adrienne Battle is the Director of Schools for MNPS.

== High Schools ==
- Antioch High School
- Cane Ridge High School
- East Nashville Magnet High School
- Glencliff High School
- Hillsboro High School
- Hume-Fogg Academic High School
- Hunters Lane High School
- James Lawson High School
- John Overton High School
- Maplewood High School
- Martin Luther King Magnet at Pearl High School
- McGavock High School
- Nashville Big Picture High School
- Nashville School of the Arts
- Pearl Cohn Entertainment Magnet High School
- Stratford STEM Magnet School Upper Campus
- Whites Creek High School

== Middle School ==
- Antioch Middle School
- Apollo Middle School
- Bellevue Middle School
- Brick Church Middle School
- Creswell Middle School
- Croft Middle School
- Donelson Middle School
- DuPont Hadley Middle School
- East Nashville Magnet Middle School
- Goodlettsville Middle School
- H.G. Hill Middle School
- Haynes Middle School
- Head Magnet Middle School
- Isaac Litton Middle School
- Jere Baxter Middle School
- John Early Museum Magnet Middle School
- John F. Kennedy Middle School
- J.T. Moore Middle School
- Madison Middle School
- Margaret Allen Middle School
- McMurray Middle School
- Meigs Magnet Middle School
- McKissack Middle School
- Oliver Middle School
- Rose Park Magnet Math and Science Middle
- Stratford STEM Magnet School Lower Campus
- Thurgood Marshall Middle School
- Two Rivers Middle School
- West End Middle School
- Wright Middle School

== Elementary School ==
- A. Z. Kelley Elementary School
- Alex Green Elementary School
- Andrew Jackson Elementary School
- Bellshire Elementary School
- Cane Ridge Elementary School
- Carter-Lawrence Elementary School
- Chadwell Elementary School
- Charlotte Park Elementary School
- Cockrill Elementary School
- Cole Elementary School
- Crieve Hall Elementary School
- Cumberland Elementary School
- Dan Mills Elementary School
- Dodson Elementary School
- DuPont Elementary School
- Eagle View Elementary School
- Eakin Elementary School
- Fall-Hamilton Elementary School
- Gateway Elementary School
- Glencliff Elementary School
- Glendale Elementary School
- Glengarry Elementary School
- Glenview Elementary School
- Goodlettsville Elementary School
- Gower Elementary School
- Granbery Elementary School
- Harpeth Valley Elementary School
- Hattie Cotton Elementary School
- Haywood Elementary School
- Henry C. Maxwell Elementary School
- Hermitage Elementary School
- Hickman Elementary School
- Hull-Jackson Elementary School
- Ida B. Wells Elementary School
- Inglewood Elementary School
- J.E. Moss Elementary School
- Joelton Elementary School
- Jones Paideia Elementary School
- Julia Green Elementary School
- Lakeview Elementary School
- Lockeland Elementary School
- Mary Werthan Shayne Elementary School
- McGavock Elementary School
- Mt.View Elementary School
- Napier Elementary School
- Norman Binkley Elementary School
- Old Center Elementary School
- Paragon Mills Elementary School
- Park Avenue Elementary School
- Pennington Elementary School
- Percy Priest Elementary School
- Robert Churchwell Elementary School
- Rosebank Elementary School
- Ruby Major Elementary School
- Shwab Elementary School
- Smith Springs Elementary School
- Stanford Elementary School
- Sylvan Park Paideia Elementary School
- Thomas A. Edison Elementary School
- Tom Joy Elementary School
- Tulip Grove Elementary School
- Tusculum Elementary School
- Una Elementary School
- Warner Elementary School
- Waverley Belmont Elementary School
- Westmeade Elementary School
- Whittsit Elementary School

== K-8 Schools ==
- Amqui K-8 School
- Neely's Bend K-8 School

== Specialty Schools ==
- The Academy at Hickory Hollow
- The Academy at Old Cockrill
- The Academy at Opry Mills

== Special Education Schools ==
- Cora Howe School
- Harris-Hillman School
- Murrell School

== Alternative Learning Centers ==
- W.A. Bass Learning Center
- Johnson Alternative Learning Center

== Adult School ==
- Transitions at Bass
