= Terry Glenn =

American football player (1974–2017)

No. 88, 83
- Position: Wide receiver

Personal information
- Born: July 23, 1974; Columbus, Ohio, U.S.
- Died: November 20, 2017 (aged 43); Irving, Texas, U.S.
- Listed height: 5 ft 11 in (1.80 m)
- Listed weight: 195 lb (88 kg)

Career information
- High school: Brookhaven (Columbus)
- College: Ohio State (1992–1995)
- NFL draft: 1996: 1st round, 7th overall pick

Career history
- New England Patriots (1996–2001); Green Bay Packers (2002); Dallas Cowboys (2003–2007)

Awards and highlights
- Super Bowl champion (XXXVI); Pro Bowl (1999); PFWA All-Rookie Team (1996); New England Patriots All-1990s Team; Fred Biletnikoff Award (1995); Consensus All-American (1995); First-team All-Big Ten (1995)

Career NFL statistics
- Receptions: 593
- Receiving yards: 8,823
- Receiving touchdowns: 44
- Stats at Pro Football Reference

Terry Tyree Glenn (July 23, 1974 – November 20, 2017) was an American professional football player who was a wide receiver in the National Football League (NFL) for the New England Patriots, Green Bay Packers, and Dallas Cowboys. He was selected by the New England Patriots seventh overall in the 1996 NFL draft. He played college football for the Ohio State Buckeyes, earning consensus All-American honors in 1995.

== Early life ==
Glenn never knew his father and his family received public assistance. When he was 13 years old, his mother was beaten to death by a man she had recently met. Glenn was shuttled between relatives until the age of 15, when he was taken in by Charles and Mary Henley, parents of a friend in Columbus, who would serve as his legal guardians. The Henleys' son (June) also played in the NFL and broke some of Gale Sayers' rushing records at the University of Kansas.

He attended Brookhaven High School, where he practiced football, basketball, track and tennis. He didn't play organized football until his sophomore season, becoming a two-way player at wide receiver and cornerback, while also returning kicks. He contributed to the school years.

As a senior in 1991, he was the team's co-captain, registering 14 receptions for 416 yards (29.7-yard avg.) with 4 touchdowns and receiving second-team All-district honors.

== College career ==
Glenn walked-on at Ohio State University, because he grew up admiring the football program, even selling soft drinks at Buckeye games as a teenager. At the time, the team employed a run-oriented offense led by running backs like Raymont Harris and Eddie George.

As a redshirt freshman, he earned a scholarship during spring drills. He saw limited action in 10 games as a backup behind Chris Sanders at flanker, totaling 8 receptions for 156 yards (sixth on the team) with a 19.5-yard average. As a sophomore in 1994, he played in 10 games as a backup to both Sanders and Joey Galloway, posting 7 receptions for 110 yards (sixth on the team) with a 15.7-yard average.

He enjoyed a breakout season as a junior in 1995 after Galloway graduated, starting 12 out of 13 games, sitting out with a separated shoulder against Minnesota. He set school records with 64 receptions for 1,411 yards and 17 touchdowns. He averaged 22 yards-per-reception, which was the highest number among Buckeyes with more than 20 catches in a season. His best game came against Pitt, making 9 receptions for 253 yards (school record), a 28.1-yard average, 4 touchdowns and a two-point conversion. He also had 17 rushing yards, 16 yards on punt returns and 29 yards on a kickoff returns, for 315 total yards in the 54–14 victory. At the end of the year, he was recognized as a consensus first-team All-American and won the Fred Biletnikoff Award as the season's outstanding college football receiver.

Glenn declared for the NFL draft after his junior season. He played in 32 career games (12 starts), finishing with 79 receptions for 1,677 yards (fifth in school history), a 21.2-yard average, 17 touchdowns and 6 carries for 31 yards. He also contributed to the return game with 18 kickoff returns for 399 yards (22.2-yard avg.) and 5 punt returns for 28 yards (5.6-yard avg.).

== Professional career ==
Pre-draft measurables
| Height | Weight | Arm length | Hand span |
|---|---|---|---|
| 5 ft 10 1/2 in (1.79 m) | 184 lb (83 kg) | 32 1/2 in (0.83 m) | 10 3/8 in (0.26 m) |
All values from NFL Combine

=== New England Patriots ===
==== 1996 season ====
Glenn was selected by the New England Patriots in the first round (seventh overall) of the 1996 NFL draft. He signed a six-year, $12 million contract. He recorded 90 receptions for 1,132 yards (12.6-yard avg.) and six touchdowns in his rookie season, while helping the team reach Super Bowl XXXI.

Patriots head coach, Bill Parcells, was outspoken of his desire to draft a defensive player and how he was overruled by team management. He made his displeasure known referring to Glenn as "she", after he pulled a hamstring two weeks into training camp, that forced him to miss the rest of training camp and the season opener against the Miami Dolphins. Parcells replied to being asked about the rookie's condition, saying: "She's making progress”.

At the time, his 90 receptions were the most ever in a single-season by a rookie in NFL history and the second most in franchise history. He was named the second alternate for the 1997 Pro Bowl.

==== 1997 season ====
Parcells left New England and Glenn went into a four-year stretch of personal difficulties and inconsistent play. In 1997, he missed 7 games because of an ankle (2 games) and hamstring (5 games) injuries. He had 7 receptions for 163 yards (fifth in team history) against the Green Bay Packers.

In the season he collected 27 receptions for 431 yards (16-yard avg.) and 2 touchdowns. He suffered a broken collarbone in the AFC Divisional Playoff Game loss against the Pittsburgh Steelers.

==== 1998 season ====
In 1998, Glenn set the Patriots receiving record with 193 yards against the Pittsburgh Steelers. He missed 4 games with a hamstring injury he suffered in the sixth game against the New York Jets. He broke his ankle in the fifteenth game against the St. Louis Rams and was placed on the injured reserve list on December 18. He finished with 10 games (9 starts), 50 receptions for 792 yards (15.8-yard avg.) and 3 touchdowns.

==== 1999 season ====
In 1999, Glenn led the team with 69 receptions for 1,147 yards (16.6-yard avg.) and 4 touchdowns in 14 games. On October 3, he set the franchise records with 13 receptions for 214 yards against the Cleveland Browns. He was declared inactive for the fifteenth game against the Buffalo Bills because of an illness and he was suspended by the team for the season finale against the Baltimore Ravens.

He had a turbulent season. On November 25, he was cited for speeding and was three hours late for practice. He was later accused of inappropriately touching a woman outside a nightclub the previous night.

On December 29, after missing the fifteenth game against the Buffalo Bills because of the flu, he was suspended for the season finale by head coach Pete Carroll, for failing to show up for treatment.

==== 2000 season ====
In January 2000, he tested positive for marijuana and entered the NFL's substance abuse program. On November 8, he was signed to a six-year $50 million contract extension with an $11.5 million signing bonus. On December 18, he was given permission to stay in Buffalo with teammates Ty Law and Troy Brown, to avoid flying in bad weather on the condition that the 3 are back in Foxboro the next day for a team meeting. The players were later seen at a strip club in Canada, Law was arrested for possession of ecstasy and they were also late getting to the Monday meeting.

Even with this type of turmoil, he still remained the best wide receiver on the team, making 16 starts for the first time in his career, to go along with 79 receptions for 963 yards (12.2-yard avg.) and 6 touchdowns.

==== 2001 season ====
In the lead-up to the 2001 season, Glenn kept having a host of off-field issues. First he was arrested for domestic assault in May and although the woman later recanted, the Patriots held back $1 million in payment on his signing bonus (the Patriots ended up withholding $10 million in bonuses). In June, he was excused from the team's minicamp so he could straighten out his personal life.

On August 3, he was suspended the first four games of the season for violating the NFL's substance abuse policy after missing a mandatory drug test. He left training camp (it has been speculated it was a pay dispute), forcing the Patriots to send a letter to his agent giving him five days to return or risk additional suspension. He still skipped practices between August 5 and 9. On August 15, he was placed on the reserve/left squad list, risking a season-long suspension.

Glenn did end up playing for the team after serving his suspension, but following injuries and more disputes with the coaching staff, head coach Bill Belichick deactivated him for the rest of the season. He only wound up playing in four games, most notably catching the first career touchdown pass thrown by Tom Brady in a game against the San Diego Chargers on October 14. He was declared inactive in 7 games, was suspended by the team for one game against the New York Jets on December 2 and was later suspended from all of the postseason run to a Super Bowl XXXVI victory, with the Patriots also deciding not to give him a Super Bowl ring. He totaled 14 receptions for 204 yards (14.6-yard avg.) and one touchdown in 4 games.

=== Green Bay Packers ===
On March 11, 2002, Glenn was traded to the Green Bay Packers in exchange for a 2002 fourth round pick (#126-Jarvis Green) and a 2003 conditional pick (#128-Bryant McNeal). As part of the deal, Glenn dropped a series of grievances against the Patriots.

In 2002, Glenn was hampered by two knee injuries suffered during training camp. He hyper-extended his right knee in practice on July 29 and later sprained the MCL in his left knee on August 7. The injuries kept him out of two weeks of practice.

Glenn appeared in 15 games (14 starts) alongside Donald Driver, making 56 receptions for 817 yards (14.6-yard avg.) and 2 touchdowns.

=== Dallas Cowboys ===
On February 28, 2003, Glenn was traded to the Dallas Cowboys in exchange for a 2004 sixth round draft choice (#188-Andy Lee) reuniting with his former head coach Bill Parcells. He started alongside Joey Galloway, leading the team with 52 receptions for 754 yards (14.5-yard avg.) and 5 touchdowns. He contributed to the team making the playoffs for the first time since 1999.

In 2004, Glenn only played in 6 games, after suffering a sprained right foot in the sixth game against the Green Bay Packers and being placed on the injured reserve list on October 30. He had 24 receptions for 400 yards (16.7-yard avg.) and 2 touchdowns. Quincy Morgan started in his place for most of the season opposite to Keyshawn Johnson.

In 2005, Glenn reunited with quarterback Drew Bledsoe. He finished with 63 receptions for 1,136 yards (his best since 1999), an 18.3-yards average (first in the NFC) and 7 touchdowns. Against the Kansas City Chiefs, he caught a touchdown pass on a flea-flicker and rushed for a touchdown on an end-around, both trick plays. Against the Kansas City Chiefs, he had 6 receptions for 157 yards and one touchdown.

On March 27, 2006, Glenn signed a five-year, $20 million contract extension with the Cowboys. It was Tony Romo's first season as a starter at quarterback, with Glenn playing opposite wide receiver Terrell Owens. He recorded another 1,000 yard season (1,047), 70 receptions and 6 touchdowns. Against the New Orleans Saints, he made 8 receptions for 150 yards.

In 2007, he missed the first fifteen games and was unable to even practice due to a pre-season arthroscopic knee surgery. He returned to practice on December 12, but did not play in Week 15 against the Philadelphia Eagles and did not fly to Carolina for the Week 16 game. He made his season debut in Week 17 against the Washington Redskins, but he didn't record an offensive touch on the year.

On July 25, 2008, Glenn was released by the Cowboys due to health concerns over his right knee, and because he did not sign an injury clause as part of his contract.

== NFL career statistics ==
| Year | Team | GP | Receiving | | | | | | Fumbles | |
| Year | Team | GP | Rec | Yds | Avg | Lng | TD | FD | Fum | Lost |
|---|---|---|---|---|---|---|---|---|---|---|
| 1996 | NE | 15 | 90 | 1,132 | 12.6 | 37 | 6 | 58 | 1 | 0 |
| 1997 | NE | 9 | 27 | 431 | 16.0 | 50 | 2 | 17 | 1 | 1 |
| 1998 | NE | 10 | 50 | 792 | 15.8 | 86 | 3 | 37 | 0 | 0 |
| 1999 | NE | 14 | 69 | 1,147 | 16.6 | 67 | 4 | 49 | 2 | 2 |
| 2000 | NE | 16 | 79 | 963 | 12.2 | 39 | 6 | 57 | 0 | 0 |
| 2001 | NE | 4 | 14 | 204 | 14.6 | 23 | 1 | 11 | 0 | 0 |
| 2002 | GB | 15 | 56 | 817 | 14.6 | 49 | 2 | 43 | 1 | 1 |
| 2003 | DAL | 16 | 52 | 754 | 14.5 | 51 | 5 | 37 | 2 | 0 |
| 2004 | DAL | 6 | 24 | 400 | 16.7 | 48 | 2 | 16 | 0 | 0 |
| 2005 | DAL | 16 | 62 | 1,136 | 18.3 | 71 | 7 | 49 | 0 | 0 |
| 2006 | DAL | 15 | 70 | 1,047 | 15.0 | 54 | 6 | 47 | 0 | 0 |
| Career | | 136 | 593 | 8,823 | 14.9 | 86 | 44 | 421 | 7 | 4 |

== Personal life ==
Glenn had seven children. Glenn was promoted to offensive coordinator for the Texas Revolution of the Champions Indoor Football League on April 3, 2015.

In 2001, Glenn was arrested for assaulting the mother of his son. In 2005, Glenn was arrested for public intoxication and public urination in a Jack in the Box parking lot. Glenn worked on several nonprofit projects with his girlfriend at the time, a Dallas County law enforcement officer. The projects targeted domestic violence awareness. The two later became engaged and continued their work in nonprofit aid as well as the two actively public speaking. They later separated, not citing their reasons for calling off the engagement in 2007, but announced they would remain supportive and present in each other's future endeavors. The two did maintain their friendship, and were photographed by each other's side years later. In 2009, Glenn was arrested on charges of public intoxication and possession of marijuana. Glenn was arrested in 2010 for auto theft of a rental car.

== Death ==
Glenn died at age 43 following a one-vehicle rollover traffic accident on November 20, 2017, in Irving, Texas, near Dallas, which left his fiancée slightly injured. His autopsy showed Glenn's blood-alcohol content was more than twice the legal limit for driving when he died.
