= Lonie Paxton =

American football player (born 1978)

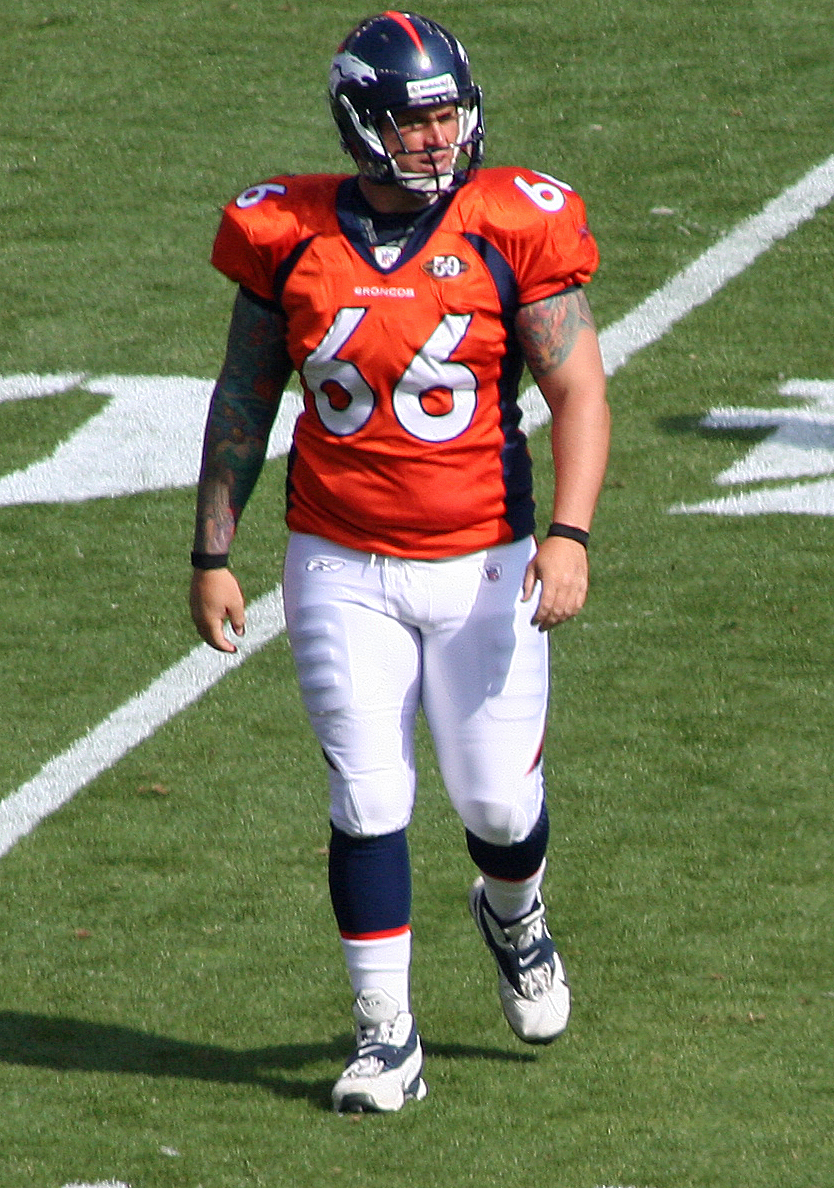
- Paxton with the Denver Broncos in 2009

No. 66
- Position: Long snapper

Personal information
- Born: March 13, 1978 (age 48); Orange, California, U.S.
- Listed height: 6 ft 2 in (1.88 m)
- Listed weight: 270 lb (122 kg)

Career information
- High school: Centennial (Corona, California)
- College: Sacramento State (1996–1999)
- NFL draft: 2000: undrafted

Career history
- New England Patriots (2000–2008); Denver Broncos (2009–2011)

Awards and highlights
- 3× Super Bowl champion (XXXVI, XXXVIII, XXXIX); New England Patriots All-Dynasty Team

Career NFL statistics
- Games played: 189
- Total tackles: 18
- Fumble recoveries: 1
- Stats at Pro Football Reference

Leonidas E. "Lonie" Paxton III (born March 13, 1978) is an American former professional football player who was a long snapper in the National Football League (NFL). He played college football for the Sacramento State Hornets and was signed by the New England Patriots as an undrafted free agent after the 2000 NFL draft. Paxton also played in the NFL for the Denver Broncos.

== Early life ==
When Paxton was a child growing up in southern California, he and his father would attend Los Angeles Rams games, where his father, a retired construction worker and football fan, had season tickets in seats right next to where the long snappers would practice during the game. At Centennial High School in Corona, California, Paxton was a three-year starter as a two-way lineman and long snapper. As a senior, he was selected as the team's Lineman of the Year.

== College career ==
At Sacramento State, Paxton was a four-year starter as a long snapper and an offensive lineman. As a junior, he was part of an offensive line that blocked for the NCAA Division I-AA rushing leader. As a senior, he helped his team lead the Big Sky Conference in rushing yards per game with 234.2 rushing yards per game. He majored in communications at Sacramento State. He earned Rookie of the Year honors as a freshman, junior of the year and co-lineman of the year as a senior.

== Professional career ==
=== New England Patriots ===
Paxton snapped on nine of Adam Vinatieri's game-winning field goals over four seasons, including his game-winning 48-yarder at the end of Super Bowl XXXVI. He famously made a snow angel in the end zone after Vinatieri kicked a 23-yard field goal in overtime to give the Patriots a 16-13 victory over the Oakland Raiders which put them in the 2001 AFC championship game. He repeated his victory snow angel on the Louisiana Superdome turf after Vinatieri's kick beat the St. Louis Rams in Super Bowl XXXVI.

In 2003, Paxton established the Active Force Foundation, a non-profit organization that designs and donates special sports equipment to physically challenged athletes.

=== Denver Broncos ===
On February 27, 2009, Paxton signed a five-year, $5.3 million contract with the Denver Broncos. The deal included a $1 million signing bonus. This made Paxton the second-highest paid long snapper in the NFL, slightly behind Ryan Pontbriand of the Cleveland Browns. He was released by Denver on February 15, 2013.

=== Retirement ===
On August 1, 2017, Paxton signed a one-day contract with the Patriots to officially retire in New England.

== Personal life ==
Paxton is the oldest of 6 siblings with 2 brothers and 3 foster brothers and sisters. He has worked with the Shriners Hospitals for Children in Sacramento, California. He is half Greek on his father's side; his father's lineage is from Sparta, Greece.

He married Meghan Vasconcellos, a former New England Patriots Cheerleader, on February 26, 2011.
