= David Nugent (American football) =

Former American football player

No. 92, 70
- Position: Defensive lineman

Personal information
- Born: October 27, 1977 (age 49); Cincinnati, Ohio, U.S.
- Listed height: 6 ft 4 in (1.93 m)
- Listed weight: 300 lb (136 kg)

Career information
- High school: Houston (Germantown, Tennessee)
- College: Purdue
- NFL draft: 2000: 6th round, 201st overall pick

Career history
- New England Patriots (2000–2001); Baltimore Ravens (2002); Oakland Raiders (2004)*; Rhein Fire (2004)
- * Offseason or practice squad member only

Awards and highlights
- Super Bowl champion (XXXVI); First-team All-NFL Europe (2004); Second-team All-Big Ten (1999)

Career NFL statistics
- Games: 24
- Tackles: 14
- Stats at Pro Football Reference

David Michael Nugent (born October 27, 1977) is an American former professional football player who was a defensive lineman for the New England Patriots and Baltimore Ravens of the National Football League (NFL). He played college football for the Purdue Boilermakers.

== Early life and education ==
Nugent attended Houston High School and later Purdue University, where he played football as a defensive tackle.

== Professional career ==
Nugent was selected in the sixth round of the 2000 NFL draft by the New England Patriots. In his rookie season he played in six games. In his second season after playing a backup role at defensive end for seven games Nugent made his first career start for the Patriots against the Cleveland Browns on December 9, 2001. Nugent and the Patriots went on to win their first Super Bowl championship that season on February 3, 2002, in Super Bowl 36. Following his release from the Patriots due to an injury in training camp the Baltimore Ravens signed Nugent to their active roster on October 29, 2002. Nugent played in nine games with the Baltimore Ravens at defensive end. On September 5, 2003, the Ravens released Nugent following training camp. In February 2004 Nugent was allocated by the Oakland Raiders to the Rhein Fire of NFL Europe where after recording six sacks he earned 1st Team All NFL Europe honors.

=== Media appearances ===
In 2024, Nugent appeared in the Apple TV+ documentary series The Dynasty: New England Patriots. His interviews focused on his time living with quarterback Tom Brady during both players' rookie years and the period surrounding the franchise’s first Super Bowl championship. The series also utilizes archival home video footage provided by Nugent from that time.

In 2024, Nugent appeared as a guest on NewsNation’s On Balance with Leland Vittert on multiple occasions, where he discussed professional development through the lens of his experiences living with quarterback Tom Brady during their early NFL careers.
