= Chris Eitzmann =

American football player (1977–2021)

No. 46
- Position: Tight end

Personal information
- Born: April 1, 1977; Belleville, Kansas, U.S.
- Died: December 29, 2021 (aged 44); Boston, Massachusetts, U.S.
- Listed height: 6 ft 5 in (1.96 m)
- Listed weight: 255 lb (116 kg)

Career information
- High school: Chester-Hubbell-Byron (Chester, Nebraska)
- College: Harvard (1995–1999)
- NFL draft: 2000: undrafted

Career history
- New England Patriots (2000)*; Green Bay Packers (2000)*; New England Patriots (2000); Cleveland Browns (2001–2002); → Frankfurt Galaxy (2002)
- * Offseason or practice squad member only

Awards and highlights
- First-team All-Ivy (1999); First-team Successful Farming farm All-American (1999)

Career NFL statistics
- Games played: 5
- Games started: 1
- Stats at Pro Football Reference

Christopher John Eitzmann (April 1, 1977 – December 29, 2021) was an American professional football tight end. He played college football at Harvard and three seasons in the National Football League (NFL) for the New England Patriots and two seasons for the Cleveland Browns.

== Early life and college ==
Born in Belleville, Kansas, Eitzmann grew up on a farm in Hardy, Nebraska. Eitzmann graduated from Chester-Hubbell-Byron High School, a school with only 50 students where he played on an eight-man football team in addition to basketball and track.

Eitzmann attended Harvard University after high school and played at tight end for the Harvard Crimson from 1995 to 1999, sitting out the 1996 season due to injury. At Harvard, Eitzmann had 45 receptions for 572 yards and eight touchdowns and was a first-team All-Ivy League and first-team Successful Farming farm All-American honoree as a senior in 1999. Eitzmann withdrew from Harvard for the spring 1997 semester to work at the trading desk of Hellman, Jordan Management in Boston. Eitzmann graduated from Harvard in 2000 with a degree in psychology.

== Professional career ==
After going undrafted in the 2000 NFL draft, Eitzmann signed with the New England Patriots as a free agent on April 19, 2000. He was waived on August 27 but signed with the Green Bay Packers the next day. Eitzmann then signed with the Patriots practice squad on September 6, one day after being waived from the Packers. Eitzmann then signed with the Patriots active roster on October 21 and appeared in five games with one start before being placed on injured reserve on December 1.

Following the preseason, the Patriots released Eitzmann on September 2, 2001. Eitzmann then signed with the Cleveland Browns practice squad on December 4, 2001. He was then allocated to the Frankfurt Galaxy of NFL Europe in 2002. With the Galaxy, Eitzmann played in seven games with five starts, with seven receptions for 64 yards. The Browns placed Eitzmann on Injured-Reserve on September 1, 2002.

== Post-football career ==
Eitzmann moved to Lincoln, Nebraska and became a financial advisor after retiring from football. In 2007, he completed his M.B.A. at the Tuck School of Business at Dartmouth College.

Eitzmann was found dead of alcohol poisoning in December 2021 at age 44. He had been suffering from CTE in the last years of his life. He was one of at least 345 NFL players to be diagnosed after death with this disease, which is caused by repeated hits to the head.
