= Garrett Johnson (American football) =

American football player (born 1975)

No. 60
- Position: Defensive tackle

Personal information
- Born: December 31, 1975 (age 50); Belleville, Illinois, U.S.
- Listed height: 6 ft 3 in (1.91 m)
- Listed weight: 231 lb (105 kg)

Career information
- High school: Belleville East
- College: Illinois
- NFL draft: 1999: undrafted

Career history
- New England Patriots (1999–2000); → Barcelona Dragons (2000); Denver Broncos (2002)*; San Francisco 49ers (2002)
- * Offseason or practice squad member only

Career NFL statistics
- Total tackles: 11
- Fumble recoveries: 1
- Stats at Pro Football Reference

Garrett Edward Johnson (born December 31, 1975) is an American former professional football player who was a defensive tackle in the National Football League (NFL). He played college football for the Illinois Fighting Illini. Johnson played for the Barcelona Dragons of NFL Europe and the New England Patriots of the NFL.

== Early life and college ==
Johnson was born in Belleville, Illinois, and graduated from Belleville East High School, where he lettered in football, basketball, and track. Johnson attended the University of Illinois at Urbana-Champaign and played at defensive tackle for the Illinois Fighting Illini from 1995 to 1998; his father Herschel played on the defensive line for Illinois in the late 1960s. A speech communications major, Johnson played in 39 games with 32 starts, recording 182 total tackles including 8.5 sacks and 22 tackles for loss, four fumble recoveries, and one forced fumble.

== Professional career ==
Following the 1999 NFL draft, Johnson first signed as an undrafted free agent with the New England Patriots. He spent the 1999 season on the practice squad.

In the spring of 2000, Johnson played in 10 games for the Barcelona Dragons of NFL Europe, recording 21 tackles, one forced fumble, one pass deflected, and 4.0 sacks. In the 2000 NFL season, Johnson played in eight games with two starts for the New England Patriots, recording 11 tackles and a fumble recovery. He was cut by the Patriots on September 2, 2001 after the preseason.

On January 22, 2002, he signed with the Denver Broncos. The Broncos waived Johnson on final cuts on September 1. The San Francisco 49ers claimed Johnson off waivers the next day but waived him on September 16.
