= Olrick Johnson =

American football player (born 1977)

No. 52, 55, 51
- Position: Linebacker

Personal information
- Born: August 20, 1977 (age 49); Miami, Florida, U.S.
- Listed height: 6 ft 0 in (1.83 m)
- Listed weight: 244 lb (111 kg)

Career information
- High school: Miami Northwestern
- College: Florida A&M
- NFL draft: 1999: undrafted

Career history
- New York Jets (1999); Minnesota Vikings (1999); New England Patriots (2000)
- Stats at Pro Football Reference

Olrick Johnson (born August 20, 1977) is an American former professional football player who was a linebacker in the National Football League (NFL). After playing college football for the Florida A&M Rattlers, he played in the NFL for the New York Jets and Minnesota Vikings in 1999 and for the New England Patriots in 2000.
