= Antioch High School (Tennessee) =

Location
- 1900 Hobson Pike; Nashville, Tennessee 37013; United States; 36°02′49″N 86°35′56″W

Information
- Type: Public High School
- Established: 1932
- School district: Metropolitan Nashville Public Schools
- Principal: Clarissa Zellars
- Teaching staff: 128.01 (on an FTE basis)
- Grades: 9–12
- Enrollment: 2,131 (2023–2024)
- Student to teacher ratio: 16.65
- Colors: Blue and white
- Athletics conference: TSSAA 6A
- Mascot: Bear
- Nickname: Bears
- Website: antiochhigh.mnps.org

Antioch High School (AHS) is a public high school located in Antioch, Tennessee, USA. It is located at 1900 Hobson Pike. It is a comprehensive high school for grades 9–12 and one of 19 high schools administered by Metropolitan Nashville Public Schools.

== History ==
Antioch High School has a history dating back to 1932. To serve the community of Antioch, the Board of Education purchased a tract of land in southeastern Davidson County and erected a brick school building. In the fall of 1933, the four-year high school formally opened. The first graduating class had 24 students and a faculty of seven.

After many years of overcrowding, a larger facility (95 classrooms) was built to replace the old high school, and in the fall of 1997 the high school moved to its current location. The new facility opened its doors to a student community of 1,857 and 90 teachers.

The old High School building, located at 5050 Blue Hole Road, is now home to Antioch Middle School. According to statistics released in 2011 by MNPS, Antioch High School's student body demographic is 40% Black, 5% White, 45% Hispanic, and 10% Arabic.

Also located in the rear of the school is the home of the Antioch High School Alumni Association which occupies the Industrial Art Building. The building contains the history of the original high school.

On March 14, 2018, the school received media attention following a walkout for gun control, as a group of students tore down the American flag and repeatedly stomped on it.

=== 2025 shooting ===
On January 22, 2025, a student with a Taurus handgun opened fire in the cafeteria. The student killed one other student and injured two other students before fatally shooting himself.

== Athletics ==
There are many sports available for students. All sporting events are overseen by the Tennessee Secondary School Athletic Association (TSSAA).

Sports at AHS include:

- Baseball
- Basketball (Boys & Girls)
- Bowling (Boys & Girls)
- Cheerleading
- Cross Country (Boys & Girls)
- Football (Freshman, Varsity, JV)
- Golf (Boys & Girls)
- Soccer (Boys & Girls)
- Softball
- Tennis (Boys & Girls)
- Track (Boys & Girls)
- Volleyball
- Wrestling

== Notable alumni ==
- Michael Wayne Atha – rapper known as Yelawolf
- Tom Bolton – pitcher in Major League Baseball, primarily with the Boston Red Sox
- LaMarcus Coker – running back with the Calgary Stampeders of the Canadian Football League
- Jason DeFord – rapper known as Jelly Roll
- Michael McAdoo – linebacker for the Dallas Cowboys of the National Football League
- Lester McClain – college football player at the University of Tennessee (1968–1970)
- Dave Ramsey – financial author
- Thom Tillis – United States Senator, elected 2014
