= Marc Megna =

American gridiron football player (born 1976)

No. 54, 58, 96
- Positions: Linebacker, defensive end

Personal information
- Born: July 30, 1976 (age 50); Fall River, Massachusetts, U.S.
- Listed height: 6 ft 2 in (1.88 m)
- Listed weight: 245 lb (111 kg)

Career information
- High school: Durfee (Fall River}
- College: Richmond
- NFL draft: 1999: 6th round, 183rd overall pick

Career history
- New York Jets (1999)*; New England Patriots (1999); Barcelona Dragons (2000); Cincinnati Bengals (2000); New England Patriots (2000); Berlin Thunder (2001); Montreal Alouettes (2002–2005)
- * Offseason or practice squad member only

Awards and highlights
- Grey Cup champion (90th); CFL East All-Star (2002); Dudley Award (1998)
- Stats at Pro Football Reference
- Stats at CFL.ca (archive)

Marc Megna (born July 30, 1976) is an American former professional football linebacker and defensive end in the National Football League (NFL), NFL Europe League and Canadian Football League (CFL). In his seven-year pro career he played for the New England Patriots and Cincinnati Bengals of the NFL, the Barcelona Dragons and Berlin Thunder of NFL Europe, and the Montreal Alouettes of the CFL. Megna played college football at Richmond.

== Professional career ==
Megna was selected by the New York Jets in the sixth round (183rd overall) of the 1999 NFL draft.
