= Tony George (American football) =

American gridiron football player (born 1975)

No. 41
- Position: Defensive back

Personal information
- Born: August 10, 1975 (age 51); Cincinnati, Ohio, U.S.
- Listed height: 5 ft 11 in (1.80 m)
- Listed weight: 205 lb (93 kg)

Career information
- High school: Forest Park (OH) Winton Woods
- College: Florida
- NFL draft: 1999: 3rd round, 91st overall pick

Career history
- New England Patriots (1999–2000); Frankfurt Galaxy (2001); Carolina Panthers (2001)*; Tennessee Titans (2002)*; Edmonton Eskimos (2003)*
- * Offseason or practice squad member only

Awards and highlights
- National champion (1996); First-team All-SEC (1998)
- Stats at Pro Football Reference

Houston Antonio George Jr. (born August 10, 1975) is an American former professional football player who was a defensive back in the National Football League (NFL) and NFL Europe for three seasons in 1999, 2000 and 2001. He played college football for the University of Florida, where he was a member of the Gators' consensus national championship team in 1996. He was a third-round pick in the 1999 NFL draft, and played for the New England Patriots and Frankfurt Galaxy.

== Early life ==
George was born in Cincinnati, Ohio. George has a younger sister, Tari, who has cerebral palsy; George has cited her as an inspiration. He attended Winton Woods High School in Forest Park, Ohio, where he played high school football for the Winton Woods Warriors. He was diagnosed as a Type 1 insulin-dependent diabetic in 1991, which was his sophomore year of high school. As an Academic All-American in high school, George was recruited by 167 colleges and he chose the University of Florida.

== College career ==
George accepted an athletic scholarship to attend the University of Florida, where he played for coach Steve Spurrier's Florida Gators football team from 1995 to 1998. George was an Academic All-SEC and All-American performer, graduating with degrees in therapeutic recreation and leisure service management.

The Gators won Southeastern Conference (SEC) championships in 1995 and 1996, and a Bowl Alliance national championship in 1996. George returned an interception for an 89-yard touchdown in the Gators' 33–20 victory over the Tennessee Volunteers in 1997, which remains the third longest touchdown return in Gators history. As a senior in 1998, he was recognized as a coaches' first-team All-SEC selection and an honorable mention All-American by Football News. George was ejected before the Gators' loss in the Florida-Florida State game in 1998, following a multiplayer scuffle.

== Professional career ==
Pre-draft measurables
Height	Weight	Arm length	Hand span	40-yard dash	10-yard split	20-yard split	20-yard shuttle	Three-cone drill	Vertical jump	Broad jump	Bench press
5 ft 10 3/8 in (1.79 m)	198 lb (90 kg)	30 7/8 in (0.78 m)	9 in (0.23 m)	4.62 s	1.61 s	2.67 s	4.24 s	7.30 s	36.5 in (0.93 m)	9 ft 9 in (2.97 m)	15 reps
All values from NFL Combine

The New England Patriots selected George in the third round (91st pick overall) of the 1999 NFL Draft. He played for the Patriots in 1999 and 2000. During his two-season NFL career, he appeared in thirty-one games. Allocated to the Frankfurt Galaxy of NFL Europe in 2001. George saw time in non regular season games with the Patriots and Panthers in 2001, Titans in 2002 and went to training camp with the Edmonton Eskimos in 2003.

== Personal life ==
George is a Christian and received his Doctorate in Divinity early 2015. George is the CEO of two companies, on the board of a record label, and is a professional speaker. He started his own company, H.E.A.T. Pro Fitness. He is certified as a NESTA master trainer, certified strength and conditioning specialist (CSCS) and AFAA. George has started his own foundation, Patriotic Mentoring, to assist with mentoring and developing youth and young adults. George lives in Fort Mill, South Carolina. He is married and the father of three, two daughters and one son.

== See also ==
- Florida Gators football, 1990–99
- List of Florida Gators in the NFL draft
