= Harold Shaw (American football) =

American football player (born 1974)

No. 42, 44
- Position: Fullback

Personal information
- Born: September 3, 1974 (age 52); Magee, Mississippi, U.S.
- Listed height: 6 ft 0 in (1.83 m)
- Listed weight: 228 lb (103 kg)

Career information
- High school: Magee
- College: Southern Miss
- NFL draft: 1998: 6th round, 176th overall pick

Career history
- New England Patriots (1998–2000); Grand Rapids Rampage (2001–2002); New England Surge (2007–2008)

Awards and highlights
- ArenaBowl champion (2001)

Career NFL statistics
- Rushing yards: 35
- Rushing average: 1.9
- Receptions: 4
- Receiving yards: 42
- Stats at Pro Football Reference

Harold Lamar Shaw (born September 3, 1974) is an American former professional football player who was a fullback and occasional linebacker for three seasons with the New England Patriots of the National Football League (NFL), the Grand Rapids Rampage of the Arena Football League (AFL) and the New England Surge of the Continental Indoor Football League (CIFL). Shaw played college football for the Southern Miss Golden Eagles.

== Professional career ==
Pre-draft measurables
Height	Weight	Arm length	Hand span	40-yard dash	10-yard split	20-yard split	20-yard shuttle	Three-cone drill	Vertical jump	Broad jump	Bench press
6 ft 0 in (1.83 m)	230 lb (104 kg)	31 3/4 in (0.81 m)	9 in (0.23 m)	4.62 s	1.59 s	2.72 s	4.43 s	7.63 s	28.5 in (0.72 m)	8 ft 9 in (2.67 m)	18 reps

=== New England Patriots ===
Shaw was selected in the sixth round of the 1998 NFL draft by the Patriots. Shaw was on the roster of New England for 3 seasons where he rushed the ball 18 times for 35 yards and caught 4 passes for 42 yards and no touchdowns. He acted primarily as a blocking fullback.

=== Post-NFL ===
In 2001 and 2002, Shaw played fullback and linebacker for the Grand Rapids Rampage of the Arena Football League. With the Rampage, Shaw ran the ball 9 times for 34 yards a 1 touchdown. He also made 2 tackles.

In 2007, Shaw reappeared in professional football, this time with the New England Surge of the CIFL.

== Personal life ==
Shaw's brother, Terrill, also played football. They were teammates together on the Rampage from 2001 to 2002.
