= Max Lane =

American football player (born 1971)

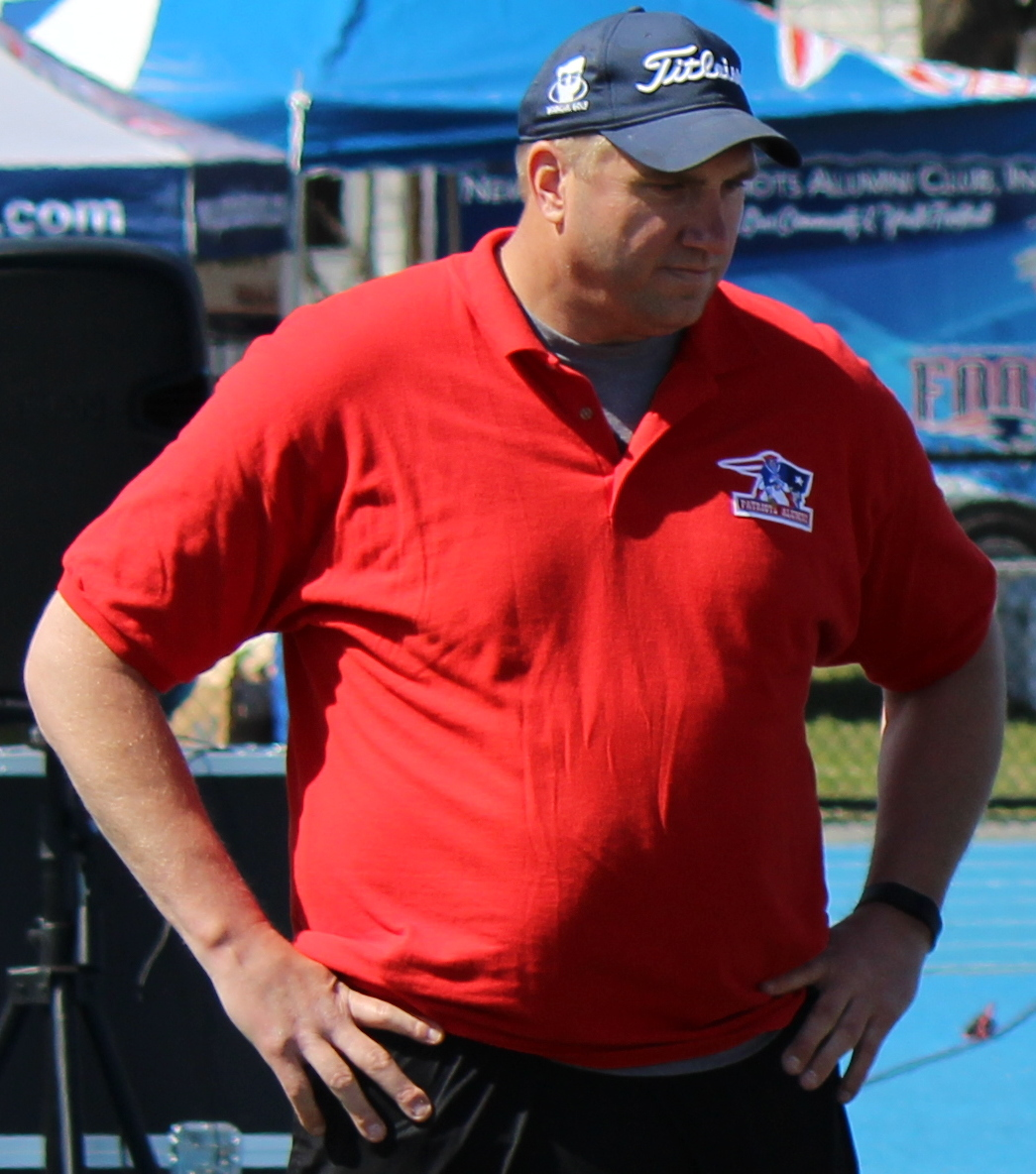
- Lane in 2016

No. 68
- Position: Offensive tackle

Personal information
- Born: February 22, 1971 (age 55); Norborne, Missouri, U.S.
- Listed height: 6 ft 5 in (1.96 m)
- Listed weight: 315 lb (143 kg)

Career information
- College: Navy
- NFL draft: 1994: 6th round, 168th overall pick

Career history
- New England Patriots (1994–2000); Houston Texans (2002)*
- * Offseason or practice squad member only

Awards and highlights
- New England Patriots All-1990s Team

Career NFL statistics
- Games played: 100
- Games started: 70
- Fumble recoveries: 5
- Stats at Pro Football Reference

Max Aaron Lane (born February 22, 1971) is an American former professional football player who was an offensive lineman for seven seasons in the National Football League (NFL) from 1994 to 2000. He started in Super Bowl XXXI for the New England Patriots.

Lane was chosen with the 168th pick in the 1994 NFL draft by the New England Patriots on April 25, 1994. He played in 100 regular season games and in 7 playoff games for the Patriots. He played offensive guard and tackle and was used as a blocking tight end in short yardage situations. Lane recovered five fumbles and advanced an airborne fumble by Troy Brown for 30 yards on October 15, 1995.

Lane was the starting right tackle for the Patriots for 16 games in 1995 and 1996. In 1997, Lane started at left guard for 15 games and at right tackle for one game. In 1998, he started at left guard for nine games and at right tackle for two games. In 1999, he started at left guard for three games, right guard for two games and right tackle for two games. In 2000, during his final season, Lane started at right guard for two games and at right tackle for three games. He was given the nickname "Big Country" by sports radio host Mike Adams.

Lane could be heard on NBC Sports Radio AM 1510 Boston every week.
