= Rod Rutledge =

American football player (born 1975)

No. 83
- Position: Tight end

Personal information
- Born: August 12, 1975 (age 51); Birmingham, Alabama, U.S.
- Listed height: 6 ft 5 in (1.96 m)
- Listed weight: 265 lb (120 kg)

Career information
- High school: E.B. Erwin (Birmingham)
- College: Alabama
- NFL draft: 1998: 2nd round, 54th overall pick

Career history
- New England Patriots (1998–2001); Houston Texans (2002)

Awards and highlights
- Super Bowl champion (XXXVI); Second-team All-SEC (1997)

Career NFL statistics
- Receptions: 27
- Receiving yards: 204
- Total touchdowns: 1
- Stats at Pro Football Reference

Rodrick Almar Rutledge (born August 12, 1975) is an American former professional football player who was a tight end for five seasons with the New England Patriots and Houston Texans of the National Football League (NFL). He was selected in the second round of the 1998 NFL draft.

Rutledge was the first player to ever catch a pass from Tom Brady, a 6-yard reception on Thanksgiving Day 2000 against the Detroit Lions. Known more for his blocking than his pass catching, Rutledge was a key member of the Super Bowl XXXVI champion Patriots.

Pre-draft measurables
Height	Weight	Arm length	Hand span	40-yard dash	10-yard split	20-yard split	Bench press
6 ft 4 7/8 in (1.95 m)	272 lb (123 kg)	35 7/8 in (0.91 m)	10 7/8 in (0.28 m)	4.99 s	1.76 s	2.91 s	20 reps
All values from the NFL Combine
