= Bruce Armstrong =

American football player (born 1965)

No. 78
- Position: Offensive tackle

Personal information
- Born: September 7, 1965 (age 61); Miami, Florida, U.S.
- Listed height: 6 ft 4 in (1.93 m)
- Listed weight: 295 lb (134 kg)

Career information
- High school: Miami Central (West Little River, Florida)
- College: Louisville
- NFL draft: 1987: 1st round, 23rd overall pick

Career history
- New England Patriots (1987–2000)

Awards and highlights
- 3× Second-team All-Pro (1988, 1990, 1996); 6× Pro Bowl (1990, 1991, 1994–1997); PFWA All-Rookie Team (1987); First Team All-South Independent (1986); New England Patriots All-1980s Team; New England Patriots All-1990s Team; New England Patriots 35th Anniversary Team; New England Patriots 50th Anniversary Team; New England Patriots Hall of Fame; New England Patriots No. 78 retired; Louisville Cardinals Ring of Honor

Career NFL statistics
- Games played: 212
- Games started: 212
- Fumble recoveries: 9
- Stats at Pro Football Reference

Bruce Charles Armstrong (born September 7, 1965) is an American former professional football player who was an offensive tackle in the National Football League (NFL) from 1987 to 2000, playing all 14 seasons with the New England Patriots. He was selected in the first round (23rd overall) in the 1987 NFL Draft out of University of Louisville, where he was a four-year varsity athlete and was named the "Most Outstanding Lineman" following his senior season.

Pre-draft measurables
| Height | Weight | Arm length | Hand span | 40-yard dash | 10-yard split | 20-yard split | 20-yard shuttle | Vertical jump | Broad jump | Bench press |
|---|---|---|---|---|---|---|---|---|---|---|
| 6 ft 4 in (1.93 m) | 284 lb (129 kg) | 32 3/4 in (0.83 m) | 10 1/4 in (0.26 m) | 5.05 s | 1.72 s | 2.93 s | 4.81 s | 27.0 in (0.69 m) | 8 ft 4 in (2.54 m) | 22 reps |
All values from NFL Combine

He was elected to play in six Pro Bowls, in 1990, 1991, 1994, 1995, 1996, 1997. The only offensive linemen to play in more Pro Bowls as a Patriot are Hall-of-Famer John Hannah and Jon Morris. Armstrong is one of only 29 Patriots to have been inducted into the Patriots Hall of Fame and one of only eight players to have his number retired. Of 220 possible non-strike games, Armstrong started in 212 (including the last 118 of his career consecutively), which until 2015, made him the single player with the most starts of any Patriot. The only games he missed were in the second half of the 1992 season, after tearing the medial collateral ligament and both his anterior and posterior cruciate ligaments in his right knee against the Buffalo Bills in November of that year. Though it was feared that the injury would be a career-ending one, Armstrong rebounded and was back the next season.

Armstrong and his wife, Melinda Yvette Armstrong, bought and operate a salon in Alpharetta, Georgia. They have two children: Candace and Nicholas.
