= Derrick Fletcher =

American football player (born 1975)

No. 64, 67, 74, 68
- Position: Guard

Personal information
- Born: September 9, 1975 (age 51); Houston, Texas, U.S.

Career information
- College: Baylor
- NFL draft: 1999: 5th round, 154th overall pick

Career history
- New England Patriots (1999–2000); Washington Redskins (2000); Carolina Panthers (2001-2002); Jacksonville Jaguars (2004-2005)

Awards and highlights
- Second-team All-Big 12 (1998)
- Stats at Pro Football Reference

Derrick Wayne Fletcher (born September 9, 1975) is an American former professional football guard in the National Football League (NFL) for the New England Patriots, Washington Redskins, Carolina Panthers, and Jacksonville Jaguars. He played college football at Baylor University and was selected in the fifth round of the 1999 NFL draft. Fletcher played high school football at Aldine High School in Houston.
