= Jason Andersen =

American football player and coach (born 1977)

No. 67
- Position: Center

Personal information
- Born: September 3, 1975 (age 51); Hayward, California, U.S.
- Listed height: 6 ft 6 in (1.98 m)
- Listed weight: 315 lb (143 kg)

Career information
- High school: Piedmont Hills (San Jose, California)
- College: BYU
- NFL draft: 1998: 7th round, 211th overall pick

Career history

Playing
- New England Patriots (1998–2000); Miami Dolphins (2000); Kansas City Chiefs (2002); Arizona Rattlers (2004); Cleveland Browns (2004)*; San Jose SaberCats (2005); Utah Blaze (2006)
- * Offseason or practice squad member only

Coaching
- Paola High School (2006) Offensive assistant; Southern Utah University (2014–present) Offensive Line; Darby Junior High School Head coach

Career NFL statistics
- Games played: 19
- Stats at Pro Football Reference

Jason Andersen (born September 3, 1977, as Jason Young) is an American former professional football player who was a center for four seasons with the New England Patriots National Football League (NFL). He played college football for the BYU Cougars. He has also played for the Kansas City Chiefs.

== Early life ==
Andersen attended Piedmont Hills High School in San Jose, California. In High School he lettered in football, basketball, and track. In football he was a two-time all-league and all-county selection as an offensive and defensive tackle and long snapper. In basketball he was a two-time all-league center. Andersen was recruited to play for BYU.

== College career ==
After graduating from high school, Andersen attended BYU, where he played multiple positions on the offensive line. In his sophomore and junior season, he played mainly right guard, with some games as right tackle. In his senior season, he played as center.

== Professional career ==
Andersen was selected in the seventh round of the 1998 NFL Draft. Andersen played for New England Patriots and Kansas City Chiefs, while being signed with the Miami Dolphins and Cleveland Browns. He also played 3 seasons in the Arena football League, playing for the Arizona Rattlers, San Jose SaberCats, and Utah Blaze.
