= Ed Ellis =

American football player (born 1975)

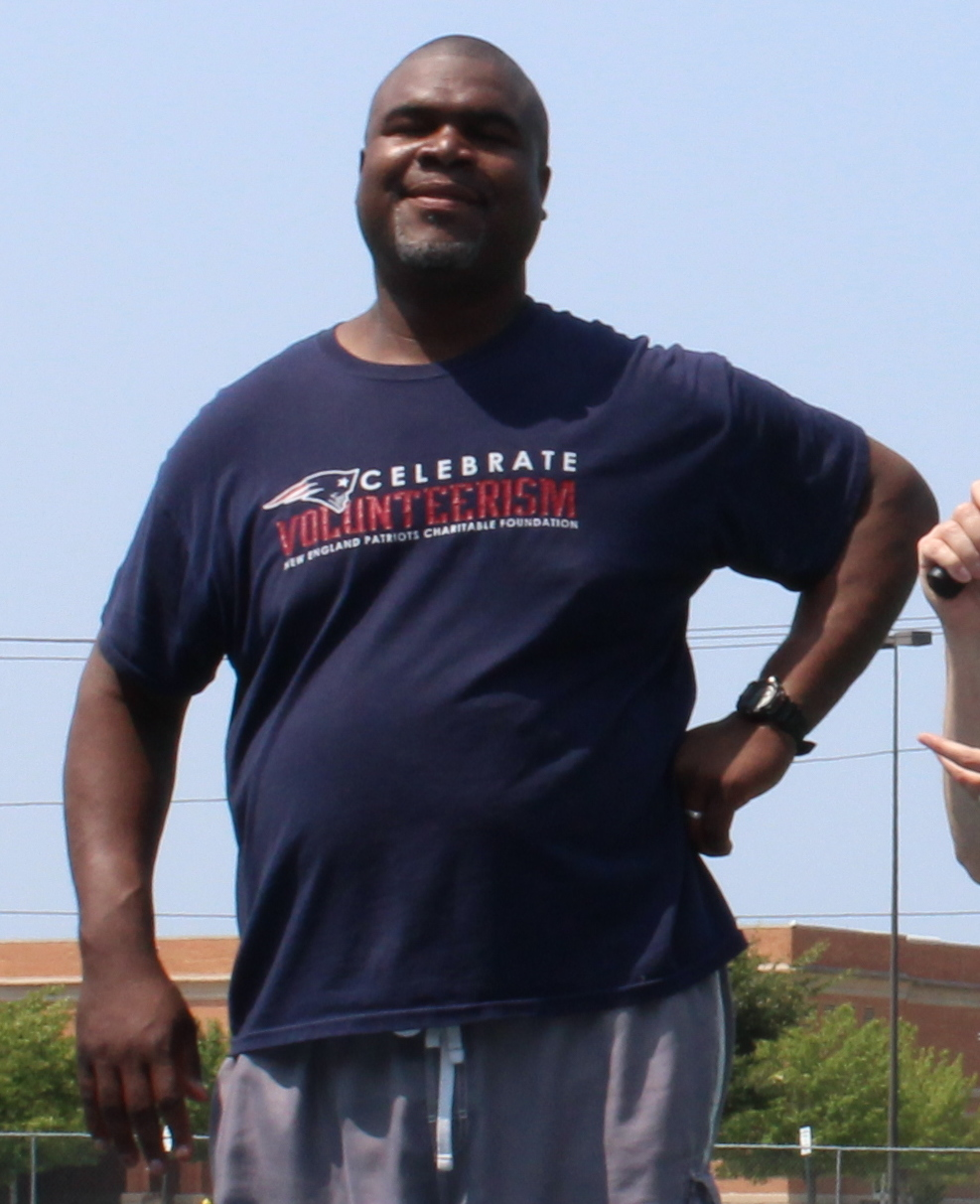
- Ellis in 2014

No. 66, 77, 69
- Position: Offensive tackle

Personal information
- Born: October 13, 1975 (age 51); Hamden, Connecticut, U.S.
- Listed height: 6 ft 5 in (1.96 m)
- Listed weight: 325 lb (147 kg)

Career information
- High school: Hamden
- College: Buffalo
- NFL draft: 1997: 4th round, 125th overall pick

Career history
- New England Patriots (1997–1999); Washington Redskins (2000); San Diego Chargers (2001–2002); Denver Broncos (2003)*; San Diego Chargers (2003); New York Giants (2004)
- * Offseason or practice squad member only

Career NFL statistics
- Games played: 54
- Games started: 7
- Stats at Pro Football Reference

Edward Key Ellis (born October 13, 1975) is an American former professional football player who was an offensive tackle in the National Football League (NFL) for the New England Patriots, Washington Redskins, San Diego Chargers, and New York Giants. He played college football for the Buffalo Bulls and was selected in the fourth round of the 1997 NFL draft.
