= 2001 New England Patriots season =

42nd season in franchise history; first with Tom Brady and first Super Bowl win

- Owner: Robert Kraft
- Head coach: Bill Belichick
- Offensive coordinator: Charlie Weis
- Defensive coordinator: Romeo Crennel
- Home stadium: Foxboro Stadium

Results
- Record: 11–5
- Division place: 1st AFC East
- Playoffs: Won Divisional Playoffs (vs. Raiders) 16–13 (OT); Won AFC Championship (at Steelers) 24–17; Won Super Bowl XXXVI (vs. Rams) 20–17
- All-Pros: None
- Pro Bowlers: QB Tom Brady; WR Troy Brown; CB Ty Law; SS Lawyer Milloy

Uniform
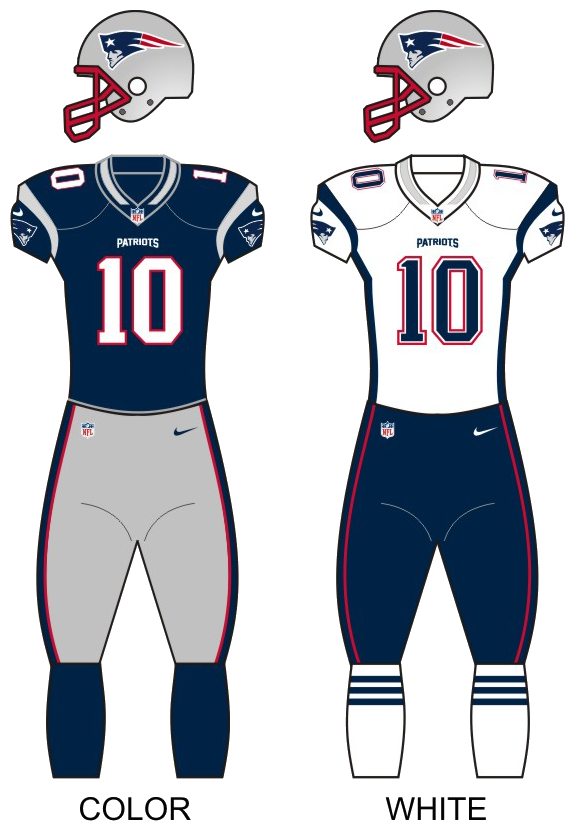

The 2001 season was the New England Patriots' 32nd in the National Football League (NFL) and their 42nd season overall. They finished with an 11–5 record and a division title before advancing to and winning Super Bowl XXXVI.

Coming off a fifth-place finish in the AFC East during head coach Bill Belichick's first season in 2000, the Patriots were not expected to fare much better in 2001. On August 6, quarterbacks coach Dick Rehbein died of cardiomyopathy at the age of 45. In the second game of the regular season, nine-year starting quarterback Drew Bledsoe, who had received a 10-year contract extension in March, was injured on a hit by New York Jets linebacker Mo Lewis, causing backup Tom Brady, a sixth-round draft pick in 2000, to enter the game after serving as the Patriots' 4th string rookie the season before. The Patriots lost the game to fall to 0–2, but Brady started the final 14 games of the season and compiled an 11–3 record as a starter, helping the Patriots clinch the 2nd seed in the AFC playoffs and a first round bye; this was their first playoff berth since 1998. As a result, the Patriots became the first team in NFL history to win the Super Bowl after starting the season 1–3, and only the second team in NFL history to win the Super Bowl after starting the season 2–3, after the 1980 Oakland Raiders.

This was the first season since 1986 that Bruce Armstrong was not on the opening-day roster.

With the second seed in the AFC playoffs, the Patriots faced the Oakland Raiders at home following a first-round bye in the final game at Foxboro Stadium; in a snowstorm, a Patriots drive late in the fourth quarter was kept alive in an application of the now-infamous tuck rule that was used in overturning a Brady fumble into an incomplete pass. Shortly after, a 45-yard Adam Vinatieri field goal through the snow, considered one of the most clutch field goals in NFL history, sent the game into overtime, when Vinatieri scored another field goal to win the game 16–13. After defeating the top-seeded 13–3 Pittsburgh Steelers 24–17 in the AFC Championship Game, the Patriots faced the heavily favored NFC's number one seeded 14–2 St. Louis Rams, known as "The Greatest Show on Turf", in Super Bowl XXXVI. Once again, Vinatieri kicked a game-winning field goal; the 48-yard kick sailed through the uprights as time expired, and gave the Patriots the win 20–17, and their first ever Super Bowl championship in what has been considered by many to be a "Cinderella" season.

The 2001 season served as a launching pad for the team. Over the next 18 seasons, they would win 16 more division titles, eight more AFC Championships in 12 appearances, five more Super Bowl titles in eight appearances, and achieve an undefeated regular season in 2007.

== Offseason ==
| Additions | Subtractions |
|---|---|
| QB Damon Huard (Dolphins) | T Bruce Armstrong (retirement) |
| FB Marc Edwards (Browns) | S Larry Whigham (Bears) |
| LB Mike Vrabel (Steelers) | DT Henry Thomas (retirement) |
| WR Charles Johnson (Eagles) | LB Chris Slade (Panthers) |
| WR Bert Emanuel (Dolphins) | FB Tony Carter (Broncos) |
| WR David Patten (Browns) | DT Chad Eaton (Seahawks) |
| WR Torrance Small (Eagles) | |
| CB Terrell Buckley (Broncos) | |
| TE Johnny McWilliams (Vikings) | |
| G Joe Panos (Bills) | |
| G Mike Compton (Lions) | |
| DE Anthony Pleasant (49ers) | |
| DT Riddick Parker (Seahawks) | |
| RB Antowain Smith (Bills) | |
| CB Terrance Shaw (Dolphins) | |
| LB Larry Izzo (Dolphins) | |
| LB Roman Phifer (Jets) | |
| LB Bryan Cox (Jets) | |

=== 2001 NFL draft ===
2001 New England Patriots draft
| Round | Pick | Player | Position | College | Notes |
| 1 | 6 | Richard Seymour * ^{†} | Defensive tackle | Georgia | |
| 2 | 48 | Matt Light * | Offensive tackle | Purdue | from Detroit |
| 3 | 86 | Brock Williams | Cornerback | Notre Dame | from Minnesota |
| 4 | 96 | Kenyatta Jones | Offensive tackle | South Florida | from San Diego |
| 4 | 119 | Jabari Holloway | Tight end | Notre Dame | from Minnesota |
| 5 | 163 | Hakim Akbar | Safety | Washington | |
| 6 | 180 | Arther Love | Tight end | South Carolina State | from Detroit |
| 6 | 200 | Leonard Myers | Cornerback | Miami (FL) | |
| 7 | 216 | Owen Pochman | Kicker | BYU | from Detroit |
| 7 | 239 | T. J. Turner | Linebacker | Michigan State | |
Made roster † Pro Football Hall of Fame * Made at least one Pro Bowl during career

=== Undrafted free agents ===
2001 undrafted free agents of note
| Player | Position | College |
|---|---|---|
| Ronney Daniels | Wide receiver | Auburn |
| Dan Hadenfeldt | Punter | Nebraska |
| Drew Inzer | Guard | Brown |
| Yubrenalei Isabelle | Linebacker | Virginia |
| Jace Sayler | Defensive Lineman | Michigan State |
| Walter Williams | Running back | Grambling State |

== Staff ==
2001 New England Patriots staff
| Front office: Chairman and owner – Robert Kraft; Vice chairman – Jonathan Kraft; Senior vice president and chief operating officer – Andy Wasynczuk; Director of player personnel – Scott Pioli; Director of college scouting – Larry Cook; Assistant director of pro scouting – Andre Tippett; Assistant director of college scouting – Lionel Vital; Football research director – Ernie Adams; Head coaches: Head coach – Bill Belichick; Assistant head coach/offensive line – Dante Scarnecchia; Offensive coaches: Offensive coordinator/running backs – Charlie Weis; Quarterbacks – Dick Rehbein (died August 6, 2001); Wide receivers – Ivan Fears; Assistant offensive line – Jeff Davidson; Coaching assistant – Ned Burke | Defensive coaches: Defensive coordinator – Romeo Crennel; Defensive line – Randy Melvin; Inside linebackers – Pepper Johnson; Outside linebackers – Rob Ryan; Defensive backs – Eric Mangini; Coaching assistant – Brian Daboll; Special teams coaches: Special teams – Brad Seely; Strength and conditioning: Strength and conditioning – Mike Woicik; Assistant strength and conditioning – Markus Paul |

== Roster ==
=== Opening training camp roster ===
At the time of the first public training camp practice at Bryant College on July 26, they had the NFL maximum of 80 players signed to their roster. The Patriots received seven roster exemptions for the NFL Europe allocations of Michael Bishop, Brad Costello, Tony George, Sean Morey, Josh Rawlings, Kato Serwanga, and Tony Simmons. Additionally, the Patriots allocated wide receiver Tony Hamler and linebackers John Eskridge and Marc Megna to NFL Europe and received roster exemptions for them, but those players were waived before the start of training camp. Finally, injured draft pick Brock Williams had not yet signed a contract at the start of camp and did not count against the roster limit.

New England Patriots 2001 opening training camp roster
| Quarterbacks: 7 Michael Bishop; 11 Drew Bledsoe; 12 Tom Brady; 19 Damon Huard; Running backs: 44 Marc Edwards FB; 47 Robert Edwards; 33 Kevin Faulk; 35 Patrick Pass FB; 46 Jeff Paulk FB; 21 J. R. Redmond; 14 Walter Williams ^{UR}; Wide receivers: 80 Troy Brown PR; 18 Ronney Daniels ^{UR}; 84 Shockmain Davis; 84 Bert Emanuel; 88 Terry Glenn; 82 Curtis Jackson; 17 Charles Johnson; 87 Dane Looker; 28 Sean Morey; 15 David Patten; 81 Tony Simmons; 13 Torrance Small; Tight ends: 86 Chris Eitzmann; 43 Johnny McWilliams; 83 Rod Rutledge; 85 Jermaine Wiggins | Offensive linemen: 63 Joe Andruzzi G; 77 Mike Compton G; 61 Adam Davis G; 60 Drew Inzer C ^{UR}; 74 Kenyatta Jones T ^{R}; 70 Adrian Klemm T; 72 Matt Light T ^{R}; 68 Stephen Neal G; 74 Joe Panos G; 62 Josh Rawlings G; 64 Greg Robinson-Randall T; 67 Grey Ruegamer C; 76 Grant Williams T; 65 Damien Woody C; Defensive linemen: 97 Reggie Grimes DE; 91 Bobby Hamilton DE; 60 Garrett Johnson NT; 92 David Nugent DE; 71 Chuck Osborne DE; 61 Riddick Parker DE; 98 Anthony Pleasant DE; 75 Jace Sayler NT ^{UR}; 93 Richard Seymour NT ^{R} | Linebackers: 54 Tedy Bruschi ILB; 58 Matt Chatham OLB; 90 Antico Dalton ILB; 50 Rob Holmberg ILB; 39 Yubrenal Isabelle ILB ^{UR}; 53 Larry Izzo ILB; 52 Ted Johnson ILB; 59 Andy Katzenmoyer ILB; 94 Greg Spires OLB; 96 Maugaula Tuitele ILB; 37 T. J. Turner OLB ^{R}; 51 Mike Vrabel OLB; Defensive backs: 29 Hakim Akbar SS ^{R}; 27 Terrell Buckley CB; 30 Je'Rod Cherry FS; 41 Tony George SS; 23 Antwan Harris FS; 38 Ray Hill CB; 34 Tebucky Jones FS; 24 Ty Law CB; 36 Lawyer Milloy SS; 25 Leonard Myers CB ^{R}; 31 Kato Serwanga CB; 22 Terrance Shaw CB; 45 Otis Smith CB; 26 Matt Stevens SS; Special teams: 9 Brad Costello P; 2 Dan Hadenfeldt P ^{UR}; 10 Lee Johnson P; 66 Lonie Paxton LS; 2 Owen Pochman K ^{R}; 4 Adam Vinatieri K | Reserve lists: 75 Terrance Beadles G (PUP); 49 Jabari Holloway TE (Active/PUP) ^{R}; 48 Arther Love TE (Active/PUP) ^{R}; 55 Willie McGinest OLB (Active/PUP); 99 Brandon Mitchell DE (Active/PUP); 32 Antowain Smith RB (Active/PUP); Unsigned draft picks: 28 Brock Williams CB ^{R}; Notations: R: 2001 rookie; UR: 2001 undrafted rookie; Italicized players are not on the 80-man roster. |

=== Week 1 roster ===
New England Patriots 2001 Week 1 roster
| Quarterbacks: 11 Drew Bledsoe; 12 Tom Brady; 19 Damon Huard; Running backs: 44 Marc Edwards FB; 33 Kevin Faulk; 35 Patrick Pass FB; 21 J. R. Redmond KR; 32 Antowain Smith; Wide receivers: 80 Troy Brown PR; 87 Bert Emanuel; 81 Charles Johnson; 86 David Patten; 84 Torrance Small; Tight ends: 83 Rod Rutledge; 85 Jermaine Wiggins | Offensive linemen: 63 Joe Andruzzi G; 77 Mike Compton G; 74 Kenyatta Jones G ^{R}; 70 Adrian Klemm T; 72 Matt Light T ^{R}; 64 Greg Robinson-Randall T; 67 Grey Ruegamer C; 76 Grant Williams T; 65 Damien Woody C; Defensive linemen: 91 Bobby Hamilton DE; 96 Brandon Mitchell DE; 97 Riddick Parker DE; 98 Anthony Pleasant DE; 94 Jace Sayler NT ^{UR}; 93 Richard Seymour NT ^{R}; 71 Chris Sullivan DE | Linebackers: 54 Tedy Bruschi ILB; 51 Bryan Cox ILB; 53 Larry Izzo ILB; 52 Ted Johnson ILB; 55 Willie McGinest OLB; 90 Marty Moore ILB; 95 Roman Phifer OLB; 99 T. J. Turner OLB ^{R}; 50 Mike Vrabel OLB; Defensive backs: 29 Hakim Akbar SS ^{R}; 27 Terrell Buckley CB; 30 Je'Rod Cherry FS; 23 Antwan Harris FS; 34 Tebucky Jones FS; 24 Ty Law CB; 36 Lawyer Milloy SS; 25 Leonard Myers CB ^{R}; 22 Terrance Shaw CB; 45 Otis Smith CB; 26 Matt Stevens SS; Special teams: 10 Lee Johnson P; 66 Lonie Paxton LS; 4 Adam Vinatieri K | Reserve lists: 88 Terry Glenn WR (Left Squad); 38 Ray Hill CB (IR); 49 Jabari Holloway TE (IR) ^{R}; 59 Andy Katzenmoyer ILB (IR); 48 Arther Love TE (PUP) ^{R}; 28 Brock Williams CB (IR) ^{R}; 14 Walter Williams RB (IR) ^{UR}; Practice squad: 68 Tom Ashworth OT ^{UR}; 58 Matt Chatham OLB; 82 Curtis Jackson WR; 60 Drew Inzer C ^{UR}; 92 David Nugent DT; Notations: R: 2001 rookie; UR: 2001 undrafted rookie; Italicized players are not on the 53-man roster. |

=== Final roster ===
New England Patriots 2001 final roster
| Quarterbacks: 11 Drew Bledsoe; 12 Tom Brady; 19 Damon Huard; Running backs: 44 Marc Edwards FB; 33 Kevin Faulk KR; 35 Patrick Pass KR; 21 J. R. Redmond; 32 Antowain Smith; Wide receivers: 80 Troy Brown PR; 84 Fred Coleman; 88 Terry Glenn; 81 Charles Johnson; 86 David Patten; Tight ends: 48 Arther Love ^{R}; 83 Rod Rutledge; 85 Jermaine Wiggins | Offensive linemen: 63 Joe Andruzzi G; 77 Mike Compton G; 74 Kenyatta Jones G/T ^{R}; 72 Matt Light T ^{R}; 61 Stephen Neal G ^{UR}; 64 Greg Robinson-Randall T; 67 Grey Ruegamer C; 76 Grant Williams T; 65 Damien Woody C; Defensive linemen: 91 Bobby Hamilton DE; 55 Willie McGinest DE; 96 Brandon Mitchell DT; 92 David Nugent DT; 97 Riddick Parker DT; 98 Anthony Pleasant DE/DT; 93 Richard Seymour DT ^{R}; 71 Chris Sullivan DE | Linebackers: 54 Tedy Bruschi MLB/OLB; 58 Matt Chatham OLB; 51 Bryan Cox MLB; 53 Larry Izzo OLB; 52 Ted Johnson MLB/OLB; 95 Roman Phifer OLB; 50 Mike Vrabel OLB; Defensive backs: 27 Terrell Buckley CB; 30 Je'Rod Cherry CB/S; 23 Antwan Harris SS; 34 Tebucky Jones FS; 24 Ty Law CB; 36 Lawyer Milloy SS; 25 Leonard Myers CB ^{R}; 22 Terrance Shaw CB/FS; 45 Otis Smith CB; 26 Matt Stevens FS; Special teams: 66 Lonie Paxton LS; 4 Adam Vinatieri K; 13 Ken Walter P | Reserve lists: 29 Hakim Akbar S (NF-Inj.) ^{R}; 99 Kole Ayi LB (IR); 38 Ray Hill CB (IR); 49 Jabari Holloway TE (IR) ^{R}; 82 Curtis Jackson WR (IR); 59 Andy Katzenmoyer LB (IR); 31 Ben Kelly CB (IR); 70 Adrian Klemm T (IR); 90 Marty Moore LB (IR); 94 Jace Sayler DT (IR) ^{UR}; 28 Brock Williams CB (IR) ^{R}; 14 Walter Williams RB (IR) ^{UR}; Practice squad: 75 Maurice Anderson DT; 68 Tom Ashworth T ^{UR}; 62 Setema Gali DE ^{UR}; 60 Drew Inzer G ^{UR}; 16 Scott McCready WR ^{UR}; Notations: R: 2001 rookie; UR: 2001 undrafted rookie; Italicized players are not on the 53-man roster.; 53 active, 12 inactive, 5 practice squad |

== Schedule ==
=== Preseason ===
| Week | Date | Opponent | Result | Record | Venue | Recap |
|---|---|---|---|---|---|---|
| 1 | August 10 | New York Giants | **W** 14–0 | 1–0 | Foxboro Stadium | Recap |
| 2 | August 18 | at Carolina Panthers | **W** 23–8 | 2–0 | Ericsson Stadium | Recap |
| 3 | August 25 | at Tampa Bay Buccaneers | **L** 3–20 | 2–1 | Raymond James Stadium | Recap |
| 4 | August 30 | Washington Redskins | **W** 33–13 | 3–1 | Foxboro Stadium | Recap |

=== Regular season ===
| Week | Date | Opponent | Result | Record | Venue | Recap |
|---|---|---|---|---|---|---|
| 1 | September 9 | at Cincinnati Bengals | **L** 17–23 | 0–1 | Paul Brown Stadium | Recap |
| 2 (Note: The Patriots were originally scheduled to play the Carolina Panthers during Week 2 of the original NFL schedule (September 16) at Ericsson Stadium in Charlotte. However, due to the September 11 attacks, the game was rescheduled to Week 17.) | September 23 | **New York Jets** | **L** 3–10 | 0–2 | Foxboro Stadium | Recap |
| 3 | September 30 | **Indianapolis Colts** | **W** 44–13 | 1–2 | Foxboro Stadium | Recap |
| 4 | October 7 | at **Miami Dolphins** | **L** 10–30 | 1–3 | Pro Player Stadium | Recap |
| 5 | October 14 | San Diego Chargers | **W** 29–26 (OT) | 2–3 | Foxboro Stadium | Recap |
| 6 | October 21 | at **Indianapolis Colts** | **W** 38–17 | 3–3 | RCA Dome | Recap |
| 7 | October 28 | at Denver Broncos | **L** 20–31 | 3–4 | Invesco Field at Mile High | Recap |
| 8 | November 4 | at Atlanta Falcons | **W** 24–10 | 4–4 | Georgia Dome | Recap |
| 9 | November 11 | **Buffalo Bills** | **W** 21–11 | 5–4 | Foxboro Stadium | Recap |
| 10 | November 18 | St. Louis Rams | **L** 17–24 | 5–5 | Foxboro Stadium | Recap |
| 11 | November 25 | New Orleans Saints | **W** 34–17 | 6–5 | Foxboro Stadium | Recap |
| 12 | December 2 | at **New York Jets** | **W** 17–16 | 7–5 | Giants Stadium | Recap |
| 13 | December 9 | Cleveland Browns | **W** 27–16 | 8–5 | Foxboro Stadium | Recap |
| 14 | December 16 | at **Buffalo Bills** | **W** 12–9 (OT) | 9–5 | Ralph Wilson Stadium | Recap |
| 15 | December 22 | **Miami Dolphins** | **W** 20–13 | 10–5 | Foxboro Stadium | Recap |
| 16 | Bye | | | | | |
| 17 | January 6 | at Carolina Panthers | **W** 38–6 | 11–5 | Ericsson Stadium | Recap |
Note: Intra-division opponents are in **bold** text.

=== Postseason ===
| Round | Date | Opponent (seed) | Result | Record | Venue | Recap |
|---|---|---|---|---|---|---|
| Wild Card | First-round bye | | | | | |
| Divisional | January 19, 2002 | Oakland Raiders (3) | **W** 16–13 (OT) | 1–0 | Foxboro Stadium | Recap |
| AFC Championship | January 27, 2002 | at Pittsburgh Steelers (1) | **W** 24–17 | 2–0 | Heinz Field | Recap |
| Super Bowl XXXVI | February 3, 2002 | St. Louis Rams (N1) | **W** 20–17 | 3–0 | Louisiana Superdome | Recap |

== Season summary ==
=== Week 1: at Cincinnati Bengals ===
Week 1: New England Patriots at Cincinnati Bengals – Game summary

| Quarter | 1 | 2 | 3 | 4 | Total |
|---|---|---|---|---|---|
| Patriots | 0 | 10 | 0 | 7 | 17 |
| Bengals | 0 | 10 | 13 | 0 | 23 |

at Paul Brown Stadium, Cincinnati, Ohio

- Date: September 9
- Game time: 1:00 p.m. EDT
- Game weather: Partly Cloudy, 78 °F (26 °C)
- Game attendance: 51,521
- Referee: John Smith
- TV announcers (CBS): Gus Johnson, Brent Jones & Sam Wyche

Game information

First quarter

- No scoring plays

Second quarter

- NE – Troy Brown 14-yard pass from Drew Bledsoe (Adam Vinatieri kick), 14:55. Patriots 7–0. Drive: 11 plays, 68 yards, 6:44.
- CIN – Neil Rackers 36-yard field goal, 11:22. Patriots 7–3. Drive: 8 plays, 12 yards, 3:33.
- NE – Adam Vinatieri 39-yard field goal, 6:04. Patriots 10–3. Drive: 9 plays, 59 yards, 5:18.
- CIN – Corey Dillon 5-yard run (Neil Rackers kick), 2:16. Tied 10–10. Drive: 7 plays, 71 yards, 3:48.

Third quarter

- CIN – Neil Rackers 47-yard field goal, 12:05. Bengals 13–10. Drive: 5 plays, 42 yards, 1:49.
- CIN – Neil Rackers 33-yard field goal, 6:01. Bengals 16–10. Drive: 9 plays, 44 yards, 4:23.
- CIN – Tony McGee 25-yard pass from Jon Kitna (Neil Rackers kick), 0:06. Bengals 23–10. Drive: 7 plays, 70 yards, 3:18.

Fourth quarter

- NE – Jermaine Wiggins 8-yard pass from Drew Bledsoe (Adam Vinatieri kick), 5:29. Bengals 23–17. Drive: 11 plays, 94 yards, 3:48.

Top passers

- NE – Drew Bledsoe – 22/38, 241 yards, 2 TD
- CIN – Jon Kitna – 18/27, 204 yards, TD

Top rushers

- NE – Antowain Smith – 11 rushes, 33 yards
- CIN – Corey Dillon – 24 rushes, 104 yards, TD

Top receivers

- NE – Troy Brown – 7 receptions, 106 yards, TD
- CIN – Darnay Scott – 5 receptions, 104 yards

The season got off to a discouraging start as the Patriots visited Paul Brown Stadium and were beaten by the Bengals 23–17, surrendering 361 yards of offense, 104 of them on the ground by Corey Dillon. Drew Bledsoe failed to complete a pass in the game's final two minutes; he also failed earlier in the game on a quarterback sneak on fourth down.

=== Week 2: vs. New York Jets ===
Week 2: New York Jets at New England Patriots – Game summary

| Quarter | 1 | 2 | 3 | 4 | Total |
|---|---|---|---|---|---|
| Jets | 0 | 3 | 7 | 0 | 10 |
| Patriots | 3 | 0 | 0 | 0 | 3 |

at Foxboro Stadium, Foxborough, Massachusetts

- Date: September 23
- Game time: 4:15 p.m. EDT
- Game weather: Partly cloudy, 74 °F (23 °C)
- Game attendance: 60,292
- Referee: Larry Nemmers
- TV announcers (CBS): Dick Enberg, Dan Dierdorf & Bonnie Bernstein

Game information

First quarter

- NE – Adam Vinatieri 24-yard field goal, 0:52. Patriots 3–0. Drive: 15 plays, 64 yards, 8:41.

Second quarter

- NYJ – John Hall 26-yard field goal, 0:00. Tied 3–3. Drive: 13 plays, 89 yards, 6:26.

Third quarter

- NYJ – Curtis Martin 8-yard run (John Hall kick), 2:29. Jets 10–3. Drive: 12 plays, 93 yards, 6:08.

Fourth quarter

- No scoring plays

Top passers

- NYJ – Vinny Testaverde – 16/28, 137 yards
- NE – Drew Bledsoe – 18/28, 159 yards, 2 INT

Top rushers

- NYJ – Curtis Martin – 24 rushes, 106 yards, TD
- NE – Marc Edwards – 6 rushes, 31 yards

Top receivers

- NYJ – Wayne Chrebet – 5 receptions, 53 yards
- NE – Troy Brown – 5 receptions, 82 yards

This was the first game played by any team since the September 11 attacks. During the fourth quarter of a 10–3 loss to the Jets, Bledsoe was hit hard while running to the sidelines by Jets linebacker Mo Lewis. The injury to his chest would send Bledsoe to the hospital following the game. Tom Brady substituted for Bledsoe following the collision, completing five of ten passes for 46 yards, and was elevated to starter for the following week. During the game, the Jets appeared to lose a fumble to the Patriots, but the fumble was reversed based on a rule that would become controversial in the subsequent playoffs – the Tuck Rule.

=== Week 3: vs. Indianapolis Colts ===
Week 3: Indianapolis Colts at New England Patriots – Game summary

| Quarter | 1 | 2 | 3 | 4 | Total |
|---|---|---|---|---|---|
| Colts | 0 | 0 | 7 | 6 | 13 |
| Patriots | 7 | 13 | 3 | 21 | 44 |

at Foxboro Stadium, Foxborough, Massachusetts

- Date: September 30
- Game time: 1:00 p.m. EDT
- Game weather: Cloudy, 59 °F (15 °C)
- Game attendance: 60,292
- Referee: Bernie Kukar
- TV announcers (CBS): Gus Johnson & Brent Jones

Game information

First quarter

- NE – Antowain Smith 4-yard run (Adam Vinatieri kick), 4:23. Patriots 7–0. Drive: 6 plays, 80 yards, 2:45.

Second quarter

- NE – Adam Vinatieri 47-yard field goal, 5:50. Patriots 10–0. Drive: 7 plays, 37 yards, 3:11.
- NE – Otis Smith 78-yard interception return (Adam Vinatieri kick), 1:42. Patriots 17–0.
- NE – Adam Vinatieri 48-yard field goal, 0:00. Patriots 20–0. Drive: 4 plays, 23 yards, 0:21.

Third quarter

- NE – Adam Vinatieri 35-yard field goal, 9:37. Patriots 23–0. Drive: 4 plays, −2 yards, 1:22.
- IND – Peyton Manning 10-yard run (Mike Vanderjagt kick), 0:53. Patriots 23–7. Drive: 7 plays, 64 yards, 3:30.

Fourth quarter

- NE – Kevin Faulk 8-yard run (Adam Vinatieri kick), 13:24. Patriots 30–7. Drive: 5 plays, 62 yards, 2:29.
- NE – Ty Law 23-yard interception return (Adam Vinatieri kick), 12:24. Patriots 37–7.
- IND – Marcus Pollard 17-yard pass from Peyton Manning (pass failed), 8:51. Patriots 37–13. Drive: 11 plays, 54 yards, 3:33.
- NE – Antowain Smith 2-yard run (Adam Vinatieri kick), 3:39. Patriots 44–13. Drive: 8 plays, 52 yards, 5:12.

Top passers

- IND – Peyton Manning – 20/34, 196 yards, TD, 3 INT
- NE – Tom Brady – 13/23, 168 yards

Top rushers

- IND – Edgerrin James – 17 rushes, 55 yards
- NE – Antowain Smith – 22 rushes, 94 yards, 2 TD

Top receivers

- IND – Marcus Pollard – 4 receptions, 63 yards, TD
- NE – Antowain Smith – 3 receptions, 58 yards

The 2–0 Colts were crushed 44–13 following a brutal hit on receiver Jerome Pathon by Patriots linebacker Bryan Cox in the first quarter. From there Colts receivers shied away from contact with Patriot defenders and Peyton Manning's pass from the Patriots 22-yard line late in the first half was intercepted by Otis Smith and returned for a touchdown. The Patriots led 23–0 late in the third quarter before Manning ran in a ten-yard score, then in the fourth the Colts collapsed entirely, surrendering 21 points (including a 23-yard Ty Law interception return touchdown) while managing just a touchdown to future Patriot Marcus Pollard. Tom Brady threw for 168 yards in his first start. This was the first matchup of the storied Tom Brady–Peyton Manning rivalry that lasted for the next 15 years.

=== Week 4: at Miami Dolphins ===
Week 4: New England Patriots at Miami Dolphins – Game summary

| Quarter | 1 | 2 | 3 | 4 | Total |
|---|---|---|---|---|---|
| Patriots | 7 | 3 | 0 | 0 | 10 |
| Dolphins | 7 | 10 | 10 | 3 | 30 |

at Pro Player Stadium, Miami Gardens, Florida

- Date: October 7
- Game time: 1:00 p.m. EDT
- Game weather: Partly cloudy, 88 °F (31 °C)
- Game attendance: 72,713
- Referee: Gerry Austin
- TV announcers (CBS): Gus Johnson & Brent Jones

Game information

First quarter

- NE – Antowain Smith 9-yard run (Adam Vinatieri kick), 12:03. Patriots 7–0. Drive: 2 plays, 10 plays, 0:46.
- MIA – Lamar Smith 7-yard run (Olindo Mare kick), 3:39. Tied 7–7. Drive: 14 plays, 80 yards, 8:24.

Second quarter

- MIA – Olindo Mare 19-yard field goal, 14:21. Dolphins 10–7. Drive: 4 plays, 8 yards, 0:52.
- NE – Adam Vinatieri 37-yard field goal, 6:42. Tied 10–10. Drive: 13 plays, 56 yards, 7:39.
- MIA – Jed Weaver 14-yard pass from Jay Fiedler (Olindo Mare kick), 0:07. Dolphins 17–10. Drive: 8 plays, 64 yards, 2:30.

Third quarter

- MIA – Olindo Mare 34-yard field goal, 7:58. Dolphins 20–10. Drive: 13 plays, 56 yards, 7:02.
- MIA – Jason Taylor 1-yard fumble return (Olindo Mare kick), 0:00. Dolphins 27–10.

Fourth quarter

- MIA – Olindo Mare 27-yard field goal, 2:08. Dolphins 30–10. Drive: 7 plays, 21 yards, 4:14.

Top passers

- NE – Tom Brady – 12/24, 86 yards
- MIA – Jay Fiedler – 11/21, 87 yards, TD, INT

Top rushers

- NE – Antowain Smith – 14 rushes, 47 yards, TD
- MIA – Lamar Smith – 29 rushes, 144 yards, TD

Top receivers

- NE – Troy Brown – 4 receptions, 47 yards
- MIA – Lamar Smith – 3 receptions, 23 yards

The Patriots scored first on Antowain Smith's 9-yard running touchdown before the Dolphins tied it up. Miami then took a 10–7 lead in the second quarter, before Adam Vinatieri kicked a 37-yard field goal to tie it. However, the Dolphins then retook the lead at 16–10 and shut down the Patriots offense the rest of the way and New England went on to lose 30–10, which made their record 1–3.

=== Week 5: vs. San Diego Chargers ===
Week 5: San Diego Chargers at New England Patriots – Game summary

| Quarter | 1 | 2 | 3 | 4 | OT | Total |
|---|---|---|---|---|---|---|
| Chargers | 3 | 3 | 7 | 13 | 0 | 26 |
| Patriots | 3 | 6 | 7 | 10 | 3 | 29 |

at Foxboro Stadium, Foxborough, Massachusetts

- Date: October 14
- Game time: 1:00 p.m. EDT
- Game weather: Cloudy and fog, 59 °F (15 °C)
- Game attendance: 60,292
- Referee: Terry McAulay
- TV announcers (CBS): Ian Eagle and Solomon Wilcots

Game information

First quarter

- NE – Adam Vinatieri 26-yard field goal, 9:56. Patriots 3–0. Drive: 13 plays, 60 yards, 5:04.
- SD – Wade Richey 21-yard field goal, 0:00. Tied 3–3. Drive: 10 plays, 50 yards, 5:19.

Second quarter

- NE – Terry Glenn 21-yard pass from Tom Brady (kick failed), 3:55. Patriots 9–3. Drive: 9 plays, 73 yards, 4:34.
- SD – Wade Richey 27-yard field goal, 0:29. Patriots 9–6. Drive: 9 plays, 58 yards, 3:26.

Third quarter

- SD – LaDainian Tomlinson 1-yard run (Wade Richey kick), 9:43. Chargers 13–9. Drive: 5 plays, 73 yards, 1:44.
- NE – Antowain Smith 1-yard run (Adam Vinatieri kick), 4:20. Patriots 16–13. Drive: 10 plays, 71 yards, 5:23.

Fourth quarter

- SD – Steve Heiden 3-yard pass from Doug Flutie (kick failed), 10:00. Chargers 19–16. Drive: 8 plays, 34 yards, 4:08.
- SD – Derrick Harris 6-yard fumble return (Wade Richey kick), 8:48. Chargers 26–16.
- NE – Adam Vinatieri 23-yard field goal, 3:31. Chargers 26–19. Drive: 15 plays, 69 yards, 5:17.
- NE – Jermaine Wiggins 3-yard pass from Tom Brady (Adam Vinatieri kick), 0:36. Tied 26–26. Drive: 8 plays, 60 yards, 1:34.

Overtime

- NE – Adam Vinatieri 44-yard field goal, 10:55. Patriots 29–26. Drive: 6 plays, 51 yards, 2:59.

Top passers

- SD – Doug Flutie – 20/32, 270 yards, TD
- NE – Tom Brady – 33/54, 364 yards, 2 TD

Top rushers

- SD – LaDainian Tomlinson – 24 rushes, 74 yards, TD
- NE – Antowain Smith – 15 rushes, 36 yards, TD

Top receivers

- SD – Curtis Conway – 4 receptions, 117 yards
- NE – Troy Brown – 11 receptions, 117 yards

The game that decisively turned the 1–3 Patriots season around came against former and future Patriot Doug Flutie along with the 3–1 Chargers' vaunted rookie LaDainian Tomlinson. Unruly receiver Terry Glenn, making his first start of the season after being benched for the opening four games, caught a 21-yard score from Tom Brady and had seven catches for 110 yards total. The Patriots led 16–13 but were struggling on special teams (Bill Belichick said, "That's the worst we've played in the kicking game in a year and a half"); Adam Vinatieri had missed a field goal try and the extra point off Glenn's touchdown, but the real special teams breakdown occurred with less than seven minutes remaining; forced to punt with his team trailing 19–16, Patriots punter Lee Johnson botched the kick and running back Derrick Harris ran in a six-yard score (the miscue cost Johnson his punting job as he was replaced by Ken Walter). But despite being down 26–16, Brady took over, directing a field goal drive, then throwing the game-tying touchdown in the final minute to Jermaine Wiggins. A last-second Wade Richey field goal try fell short, and in overtime Brady picked up a Chargers blitz and led a drive that ended in Vinatieri's 44-yard field goal and a 29–26 Patriots final.

=== Week 6: at Indianapolis Colts ===
Week 6: New England Patriots at Indianapolis Colts – Game summary

| Quarter | 1 | 2 | 3 | 4 | Total |
|---|---|---|---|---|---|
| Patriots | 7 | 21 | 3 | 7 | 38 |
| Colts | 3 | 3 | 11 | 0 | 17 |

at RCA Dome, Indianapolis, Indiana

- Date: October 21
- Game time: 1:00 p.m. EDT
- Game weather: Played indoors (dome stadium)
- Game attendance: 56,022
- Referee: Tom White
- TV announcers (CBS): Ian Eagle & Solomon Wilcots

Game information

First quarter

- NE – David Patten 29-yard run (Adam Vinatieri kick), 10:35. Patriots 7–0. Drive: 1 play, 29 yards, 0:08.
- IND – Mike Vanderjagt 42-yard field goal, 5:44. Patriots 7–3. Drive: 10 plays, 47 yards, 4:51.

Second quarter

- NE – David Patten 91-yard pass from Tom Brady (Adam Vinatieri kick), 8:56. Patriots 14–3. Drive: 1 play, 91 yards, 0:08.
- NE – Troy Brown 60-yard pass from David Patten (Adam Vinatieri kick), 7:11. Patriots 21–3. Drive: 1 play, 60 yards, 0:10.
- NE – Jermaine Wiggins 2-yard pass from Tom Brady (Adam Vinatieri kick), 1:17. Patriots 28–3. Drive: 6 plays, 24 yards, 2:28.
- IND – Mike Vanderjagt 42-yard field goal, 0:11. Patriots 28–6. Drive: 8 plays, 56 yards, 1:06.

Third quarter

- IND – Marvin Harrison 2-yard pass from Peyton Manning (Peyton Manning pass to Ken Dilger), 8:20. Patriots 28–14. Drive: 10 plays, 68 yards, 5:05.
- NE – Adam Vinatieri 43-yard field goal, 4:34. Patriots 31–14. Drive: 8 plays, 44 yards, 3:46.
- IND – Mike Vanderjagt 24-yard field goal, 1:31. Patriots 31–17. Drive: 10 plays, 64 yards, 3:03.

Fourth quarter

- NE – David Patten 6-yard pass from Tom Brady (Adam Vinatieri kick), 14:02. Patriots 38–17. Drive: 4 plays, 63 yards, 2:29.

Top passers

- NE – Tom Brady – 16/20, 202 yards, 3 TD
- IND – Peyton Manning – 22/34, 335 yards, TD

Top rushers

- NE – Antowain Smith – 21 rushes, 71 yards
- IND – Edgerrin James – 30 rushes, 145 yards

Top receivers

- NE – Troy Brown – 8 receptions, 120 yards, TD
- IND – Marvin Harrison – 8 receptions, 157 yards, TD

In what turned out to be their last trip to the RCA Dome until the post-realignment 2003 season, the Patriots followed up their September rout of the Colts with a 38–17 thrashing highlighted by the one-man scoring explosion of David Patten, who ran in a 29-yard touchdown following the return of a blocked Mike Vanderjagt kick, caught a 91-yard bomb from Tom Brady, then on a flea-flick play threw a 60-yard strike to Troy Brown, all in the first half. Despite outgaining the Patriots in total yards (484 to 385) the Colts lost two fumbles, saw two Mike Vanderjagt field goal attempts blocked (the second came at the end of the first quarter), and Peyton Manning was sacked four times as the Colts' season began spiraling into collapse.

=== Week 7: at Denver Broncos ===
Week 7: New England Patriots at Denver Broncos – Game summary

| Quarter | 1 | 2 | 3 | 4 | Total |
|---|---|---|---|---|---|
| Patriots | 10 | 7 | 3 | 0 | 20 |
| Broncos | 7 | 3 | 14 | 7 | 31 |

at Invesco Field at Mile High, Denver, Colorado

- Date: October 28
- Game time: 12:15 p.m. MST/2:15 p.m. EST
- Game weather: Sunny, 72 °F (22 °C)
- Game attendance: 74,750
- Referee: Walt Coleman
- TV announcers (CBS): Don Criqui & Steve Tasker

Game information

First quarter

- NE – Adam Vinatieri 24-yard field goal, 9:06. Patriots 3–0. Drive: 10 plays, 74 yards, 5:54.
- NE – David Patten 30-yard pass from Tom Brady (Adam Vinatieri kick), 4:57. Patriots 10–0. Drive: 4 plays, 69 yards, 2:01.
- DEN – Mike Anderson 8-yard run (Jason Elam kick), 0:57. Patriots 10–7. Drive: 7 plays, 80 yards, 4:00.

Second quarter

- DEN – Jason Elam 50-yard field goal, 4:03. Tied 10–10. Drive: 17 plays, 66 yards, 8:40.
- NE – Troy Brown 5-yard pass from Tom Brady (Adam Vinatieri kick), 1:21. Patriots 17–10. Drive: 3 plays, 17 yards, 0:49.

Third quarter

- NE – Adam Vinatieri 44-yard field goal, 10:59. Patriots 20–10. Drive: 4 plays, −2 yards, 2:39.
- DEN – Rod Smith 65-yard pass from Brian Griese (Jason Elam kick), 10:35. Patriots 20–17. Drive: 1 play, 65 yards, 0:24.
- DEN – Dwayne Carswell 6-yard pass from Brian Griese (Jason Elam kick), 3:35. Broncos 24–20. Drive: 9 plays, 80 yards, 3:10.

Fourth quarter

- DEN – Denard Walker 39-yard interception return (Jason Elam kick), 2:24. Broncos 31–20.

Top passers

- NE – Tom Brady – 25/38, 203 yards, 2 TD, 4 INT
- DEN – Brian Griese – 19/30, 283 yards, 2 TD, 2 INT

Top rushers

- NE – Antowain Smith – 12 rushes, 56 yards
- DEN – Mike Anderson – 14 rushes, 40 yards, TD

Top receivers

- NE – Troy Brown – 9 receptions, 86 yards, TD
- DEN – Rod Smith – 6 receptions, 159 yards, TD

The Patriots led 17–10 at halftime against the Broncos. However, the Broncos came back and held the Patriots to just three points in the second half and handed the Patriots their fourth loss of the year. Tom Brady threw an interception for the first time his career, which ended a streak of 162 consecutive pass attempts without an interception thrown.

=== Week 8: at Atlanta Falcons ===
Week 8: New England Patriots at Atlanta Falcons – Game summary

| Quarter | 1 | 2 | 3 | 4 | Total |
|---|---|---|---|---|---|
| Patriots | 0 | 17 | 7 | 0 | 24 |
| Falcons | 7 | 0 | 0 | 3 | 10 |

at Georgia Dome, Atlanta, Georgia

- Date: November 4
- Game time: 1:00 p.m. EST
- Game weather: Played indoors (dome stadium)
- Game attendance: 44,229
- Referee: Dick Hantak
- TV announcers (CBS): Craig Bolerjack & Trevor Matich

Game information

First quarter

- ATL – Shawn Jefferson 19-yard pass from Chris Chandler (Jay Feely kick), 2:35. Falcons 7–0. Drive: 7 plays, 89 yards, 3:03.

Second quarter

- NE – Kevin Faulk 4-yard pass from Tom Brady (Adam Vinatieri kick), 9:00. Tied 7–7. Drive: 16 plays, 75 yards, 8:35.
- NE – Adam Vinatieri 48-yard field goal, 4:26. Patriots 10–7. Drive: 4 plays, −4 yards, 3:32.
- NE – Marc Edwards 15-yard pass from Tom Brady (Adam Vinatieri kick), 0:15. Patriots 17–7. Drive: 10 plays, 89 yards, 2:41.

Third quarter

- NE – Troy Brown 44-yard pass from Tom Brady (Adam Vinatieri kick), 0:34. Patriots 24–7. Drive: 4 plays, 80 yards, 1:52.

Fourth quarter

- ATL – Jay Feely 20-yard field goal, 11:28. Patriots 24–10. Drive: 7 plays, 60 yards, 4:06.

Top passers

- NE – Tom Brady – 21/31, 250 yards, 3 TD
- ATL – Chris Chandler – 8/20, 95 yards, TD, INT

Top rushers

- NE – Antowain Smith – 23 rushes, 117 yards
- ATL – Maurice Smith – 16 rushes, 84 yards

Top receivers

- NE – Troy Brown – 5 receptions, 99 yards, TD
- ATL – Brian Finneran – 1 reception, 50 yards

Former Patriot Shawn Jefferson caught a 19-yard touchdown from Chris Chandler, but Chandler was sacked six times and knocked out of the game; rookie Michael Vick threw for 56 yards and rushed for 50 more but was sacked three times. The most bizarre score of the game came in the third as a Tom Brady pass for David Patten was deflected by Ashley Ambrose and caught at the 30-yard line by Troy Brown for a 44-yard touchdown; Belichick and Brown compared the play to The Immaculate Reception, as did the CBS telecasting crew. The Patriots won 24–10.

=== Week 9: vs. Buffalo Bills ===
Week 9: Buffalo Bills at New England Patriots – Game summary

| Quarter | 1 | 2 | 3 | 4 | Total |
|---|---|---|---|---|---|
| Bills | 0 | 3 | 0 | 8 | 11 |
| Patriots | 7 | 0 | 7 | 7 | 21 |

at Foxboro Stadium, Foxborough, Massachusetts

- Date: November 11
- Game time: 1:00 p.m. EST
- Game weather: Sunny, 47 °F (8 °C)
- Game attendance: 60,292
- Referee: Jeff Triplette
- TV announcers (CBS): Gus Johnson and Brent Jones

Game information

First quarter

- NE – Kevin Faulk 6-yard pass from Tom Brady (Adam Vinatieri kick), 3:09. Patriots 7–0. Drive: 6 plays, 35 yards, 3:23.

Second quarter

- BUF – Jake Arians 24-yard field goal, 11:38. Patriots 7–3. Drive: 8 plays, 72 yards, 4:31.

Third quarter

- NE – Antowain Smith 1-yard run (Adam Vinatieri kick), 7:27. Patriots 14–3. Drive: 5 plays, 40 yards, 2:44.

Fourth quarter

- BUF – Peerless Price 17-yard pass from Alex Van Pelt (Alex Van Pelt pass to Eric Moulds), 2:43. Patriots 14–11. Drive: 2 plays, 17 yards, 0:10.
- NE – Antowain Smith 42-yard run (Adam Vinatieri kick), 1:52. Patriots 21–11. Drive: 2 plays, 45 yards, 0:51.

Top passers

- BUF – Rob Johnson – 14/26, 167 yards, INT
- NE – Tom Brady – 15/21, 107 yards, TD, INT

Top rushers

- BUF – Travis Henry – 16 rushes, 51 yards
- NE – Antowain Smith – 20 rushes, 100 yards, 2 TD

Top receivers

- BUF – Reggie Germany – 4 receptions, 69 yards
- NE – Kevin Faulk – 7 receptions, 29 yards, TD

The Patriots were up 7–3 at halftime against the Bills, and went on to win 21–11 as the New England defense held the Bills to eight points in the second half.

=== Week 10: vs. St. Louis Rams ===
Week 10: St. Louis Rams at New England Patriots – Game summary

| Quarter | 1 | 2 | 3 | 4 | Total |
|---|---|---|---|---|---|
| Rams | 7 | 7 | 3 | 7 | 24 |
| Patriots | 7 | 3 | 0 | 7 | 17 |

at Foxboro Stadium, Foxborough, Massachusetts

- Date: November 18
- Game time: 8:35 p.m. EST
- Game weather: Partly cloudy, 49 °F (9 °C)
- Game attendance: 60,292
- Referee: Bill Leavy
- TV announcers (ESPN): Mike Patrick, Joe Theismann, Paul Maguire and Suzy Kolber

Game information

First quarter

- STL – Torry Holt 16-yard pass from Kurt Warner (Jeff Wilkins kick), 9:38. Rams 7–0. Drive: 3 plays, 18 yards, 1:23.
- NE – Terrell Buckley 52-yard interception return (Adam Vinatieri kick), 1:55. Tied 7–7.

Second quarter

- NE – Adam Vinatieri 33-yard field goal, 14:06. Patriots 10–7. Drive: 5 plays, 25 yards, 2:11.
- STL – Marshall Faulk 9-yard pass from Kurt Warner (Jeff Wilkins kick), 0:31. Rams 14–10. Drive: 8 plays, 97 yards, 1:41.

Third quarter

- STL – Jeff Wilkins 35-yard field goal, 3:06. Rams 17–10. Drive: 6 plays, 25 yards, 2:00.

Fourth quarter

- STL – James Hodgins 11-yard pass from Kurt Warner (Jeff Wilkins kick), 10:32. Rams 24–10. Drive: 11 plays, 75 yards, 6:01.
- NE – David Patten 10-yard pass from Tom Brady (Adam Vinatieri kick), 7:46. Rams 24–17. Drive: 5 plays, 65 yards, 2:46.

Top passers

- STL – Kurt Warner – 30/42, 401 yards, 3 TD, 2 INT
- NE – Tom Brady – 19/27, 185 yards, TD, 2 INT

Top rushers

- STL – Marshall Faulk – 20 rushes, 83 yards
- NE – Antowain Smith – 15 rushes, 36 yards

Top receivers

- STL – Isaac Bruce – 7 receptions, 130 yards
- NE – Troy Brown – 8 receptions, 91 yards

In what would become a preview of Super Bowl XXXVI, the Patriots squandered a goalline opportunity when they fumbled to the Rams late in the second quarter; the Rams drove downfield and scored. The Patriots' defense was unable to stop Kurt Warner and get the ball back late in the game, as the Rams salted away a 24–17 win. The win proved costly, as five Rams starters were knocked out of the game, and coach Mike Martz prophetically said afterward that the Patriots were a Super Bowl-caliber team. Oddly enough, this was the last loss for the Patriots during the 2001 season. In addition, this would be the Patriots last loss to the Rams until 2020 & their last at home until 2024.

=== Week 11: vs. New Orleans Saints ===
Week 11: New Orleans Saints at New England Patriots – Game summary

| Quarter | 1 | 2 | 3 | 4 | Total |
|---|---|---|---|---|---|
| Saints | 0 | 0 | 10 | 7 | 17 |
| Patriots | 7 | 13 | 0 | 14 | 34 |

at Foxboro Stadium, Foxborough, Massachusetts

- Date: November 25
- Game time: 4:05 p.m. EST
- Game weather: Cloudy, 62 °F (17 °C)
- Game attendance: 60,292
- Referee: Gerry Austin
- TV announcers (FOX): Sam Rosen, Bill Maas & Levan Reid

Game information

First quarter

- NE – Antowain Smith 41-yard pass from Tom Brady (Adam Vinatieri kick), 11:35. Patriots 7–0. Drive: 6 plays, 85 yards, 3:25.

Second quarter

- NE – Troy Brown 8-yard pass from Tom Brady (pass failed), 7:23. Patriots 13–0. Drive: 8 plays, 93 yards, 4:06.
- NE – Charles Johnson 24-yard pass from Tom Brady (Adam Vinatieri kick), 0:10. Patriots 20–0. Drive: 6 plays, 78 yards, 1:40.

Third quarter

- NO – John Carney 31-yard field goal, 6:59. Patriots 20–3. Drive: 7 plays, 49 yards, 1:19.
- NO – Ricky Williams 3-yard run (John Carney kick), 2:11. Patriots 20–10. Drive: 6 plays, 83 yards, 2:35.

Fourth quarter

- NE – Marc Edwards 2-yard pass from Tom Brady (Adam Vinatieri kick), 13:24. Patriots 27–10. Drive: 8 plays, 80 yards, 3:47.
- NO – Willie Jackson 7-yard pass from Aaron Brooks (John Carney kick), 8:15. Patriots 27–17. Drive: 13 plays, 83 yards, 2:35.
- NE – Antowain Smith 3-yard run (Adam Vinatieri kick), 2:25. Patriots 34–17. Drive: 10 plays, 68 yards, 5:50.

Top passers

- NO – Aaron Brooks – 16/39, 307 yards, TD, 2 INT
- NE – Tom Brady – 19/26, 258 yards, 4 TD

Top rushers

- NO – Aaron Brooks – 7 rushes, 65 yards
- NE – Antowain Smith – 24 rushes, 111 yards, TD

Top receivers

- NO – Joe Horn – 4 receptions, 97 yards
- NE – Troy Brown – 7 receptions, 91 yards, TD

Drew Bledsoe was medically cleared to return to the field, but Bill Belichick ruled that Brady would remain the starter. Brady responded with four touchdowns in a 34–17 triumph. Ricky Williams, soon to leave the Saints for the Miami Dolphins, rushed for 56 yards and a touchdown in his first encounter with the Patriots.

=== Week 12: at New York Jets ===
Week 12: New England Patriots at New York Jets – Game summary

| Quarter | 1 | 2 | 3 | 4 | Total |
|---|---|---|---|---|---|
| Patriots | 0 | 0 | 14 | 3 | 17 |
| Jets | 10 | 3 | 3 | 0 | 16 |

at Giants Stadium, East Rutherford, New Jersey

- Date: December 2
- Game time: 1:00 p.m. EST
- Game weather: Partly cloudy, 53 °F (12 °C)
- Game attendance: 78,712
- Referee: Bob McElwee
- TV announcers (CBS): Gus Johnson, Brent Jones & Marcus Allen

Game information

First quarter

- NYJ – Laveranues Coles 34-yard pass from Vinny Testaverde (John Hall kick), 11:52. Jets 7–0. Drive: 6 plays, 72 yards, 3:08.
- NYJ – John Hall 19-yard field goal, 4:53. Jets 10–0. Drive: 9 plays, 53 yards, 4:49.

Second quarter

- NYJ – John Hall 40-yard field goal, 2:47. Jets 13–0. Drive: 10 plays, 44 yards, 5:02.

Third quarter

- NE – Antowain Smith 4-yard run (Adam Vinatieri kick), 10:19. Jets 13–7. Drive: 5 plays, 57 yards, 2:06.
- NYJ – John Hall 50-yard field goal, 6:57. Jets 16–7. Drive: 6 plays, 20 yards, 3:22.
- NE – Marc Edwards 4-yard run (Adam Vinatieri kick), 2:11. Jets 16–14. Drive: 9 plays, 82 yards, 4:46.

Fourth quarter

- NE – Adam Vinatieri 28-yard field goal, 6:29. Patriots 17–16. Drive: 11 plays, 57 yards, 5:47.

Top passers

- NE – Tom Brady – 20/28, 213 yards
- NYJ – Vinny Testaverde – 18/32, 172 yards, TD, 2 INT

Top rushers

- NE – Antowain Smith – 12 rushes, 28 yards, TD
- NYJ – Curtis Martin – 20 rushes, 99 yards

Top receivers

- NE – David Patten – 6 receptions, 60 yards
- NYJ – Laveranues Coles – 3 receptions, 63 yards, TD

The Jets bullied the Patriots en route to a 13–0 halftime lead, but the Patriots stormed back, scoring 14 third-quarter points en route to a 17–16 win.

=== Week 13: vs. Cleveland Browns ===
Week 13: Cleveland Browns at New England Patriots – Game summary

| Quarter | 1 | 2 | 3 | 4 | Total |
|---|---|---|---|---|---|
| Browns | 10 | 0 | 3 | 3 | 16 |
| Patriots | 3 | 17 | 0 | 7 | 27 |

at Foxboro Stadium, Foxborough, Massachusetts

- Date: December 9
- Game time: 1:00 p.m. EST
- Game weather: Cloudy, 37 °F (3 °C)
- Game attendance: 60,292
- Referee: Walt Coleman
- TV announcers (CBS): Gus Johnson & Brent Jones

Game information

First quarter

- NE – Adam Vinatieri 54-yard field goal, 9:41. Patriots 3–0. Drive: 7 plays, 17 yards, 4:27.
- CLE – Phil Dawson 27-yard field goal, 1:21. Tied 3–3. Drive: 16 plays, 59 yards, 8:20.
- CLE – Corey Fuller 49-yard interception return (Phil Dawson kick), 1:02. Browns 10–3.

Second quarter

- NE – Antowain Smith 1-yard run (Adam Vinatieri kick), 9:39. Tied 10–10. Drive: 11 plays, 66 yards, 6:23.
- NE – Troy Brown 85-yard punt return (Adam Vinatieri kick), 3:28. Patriots 17–10.
- NE – Adam Vinatieri 38-yard field goal, 0:03. Patriots 20–10. Drive: 8 plays, 51 yards, 1:14.

Third quarter

- CLE – Phil Dawson 39-yard field goal, 10:45. Patriots 20–13. Drive: 7 plays, 16 yards, 3:07.

Fourth quarter

- CLE – Phil Dawson 22-yard field goal, 12:39. Patriots 20–16. Drive: 7 plays, 58 yards, 2:21.
- NE – Antowain Smith 5-yard run (Adam Vinatieri kick), 2:43. Patriots 27–16. Drive: 6 plays, 36 yards, 3:21.

Top passers

- CLE – Tim Couch – 20/39, 244 yards, 3 INT
- NE – Tom Brady – 19/28, 218 yards, 2 INT

Top rushers

- CLE – James Jackson – 16 rushes, 34 yards
- NE – Antowain Smith – 21 rushes, 76 yards, 2 TD

Top receivers

- CLE – Kevin Johnson – 8 receptions, 95 yards
- NE – Troy Brown – 7 receptions, 89 yards

The Browns held a 10–3 lead after one quarter, but the Patriots were able to rally for 24 points in the final three quarters as the defense held the Browns to just six points in the second half as New England improved their record to 8–5.

=== Week 14: at Buffalo Bills ===
Week 14: New England Patriots at Buffalo Bills – Game summary

| Quarter | 1 | 2 | 3 | 4 | OT | Total |
|---|---|---|---|---|---|---|
| Patriots | 3 | 3 | 0 | 3 | 3 | 12 |
| Bills | 0 | 0 | 3 | 6 | 0 | 9 |

at Ralph Wilson Stadium, Orchard Park, New York

- Date: December 16
- Game time: 1:00 p.m. EST
- Game weather: Cloudy, 34 °F (1 °C)
- Game attendance: 45,527
- Referee: Mike Carey
- TV announcers (CBS): Don Criqui and Steve Tasker

Game information

First quarter

- NE – Adam Vinatieri 40-yard field goal, 4:02. Patriots 3–0. Drive: 9 plays, 28 yards, 4:09.

Second quarter

- NE – Adam Vinatieri 32-yard field goal, 0:53. Patriots 6–0. Drive: 7 plays, 50 yards, 1:52.

Third quarter

- BUF – Shayne Graham 41-yard field goal, 11:13. Patriots 6–3. Drive: 4 plays, 7 yards, 2:06.

Fourth quarter

- BUF – Shayne Graham 25-yard field goal, 10:38. Tied 6–6. Drive: 15 plays, 76 yards, 7:46.
- BUF – Shayne Graham 41-yard field goal, 5:57. Bills 9–6. Drive: 8 plays, 33 yards, 3:04.
- NE – Adam Vinatieri 25-yard field goal, 2:45. Tied 9–9. Drive: 7 plays, 56 yards, 3:12.

Overtime

- NE – Adam Vinatieri 23-yard field goal, 9:15. Patriots 12–9. Drive: 8 plays, 75 yards, 3:18.

Top passers

- NE – Tom Brady – 19/35, 237 yards, INT
- BUF – Alex Van Pelt – 22/44, 219 yards, INT

Top rushers

- NE – Antowain Smith – 20 rushes, 95 yards
- BUF – Travis Henry – 12 rushes, 54 yards

Top receivers

- NE – David Patten – 3 receptions, 65 yards
- BUF – Peerless Price – 4 receptions, 67 yards

Field goals ruled the day as the Buffalo Bills' Shayne Graham and the Patriots' Adam Vinatieri kicked seven combined in a 12–9 overtime Patriots win. The most controversial play came in overtime when David Patten caught a pass and was knocked out of bounds; the ball bounced off his feet and was recovered by the Bills, but the play went to review and referee Mike Carey determined that Patten, momentarily unconscious, had his head out of bounds when the ball touched his feet; by rule the ball was dead. The Patriots thus retained possession enough for the game-winning 23-yard field goal.

=== Week 15: vs. Miami Dolphins ===
Week 15: Miami Dolphins at New England Patriots – Game summary

| Quarter | 1 | 2 | 3 | 4 | Total |
|---|---|---|---|---|---|
| Dolphins | 0 | 3 | 0 | 10 | 13 |
| Patriots | 0 | 20 | 0 | 0 | 20 |

at Foxboro Stadium, Foxborough, Massachusetts

- Date: December 22
- Game time: 1:35 p.m. EST
- Game weather: Sunny, 37 °F (3 °C)
- Game attendance: 60,292
- Referee: Jeff Triplette
- TV announcers (CBS): Greg Gumbel, Phil Simms & Armen Keteyian

Game information

First quarter

- No scoring plays

Second quarter

- NE – Antowain Smith 2-yard run (Adam Vinatieri kick), 14:57. Patriots 7–0. Drive: 5 plays, 52 yards, 1:41.
- NE – Patrick Pass 23-yard pass from Tom Brady (Adam Vinatieri kick), 10:58. Patriots 14–0. Drive: 4 plays, 73 yards, 2:19.
- NE – Adam Vinatieri 32-yard field goal, 4:31. Patriots 17–0. Drive: 10 plays, 53 yards, 5:22.
- NE – Adam Vinatieri 23-yard field goal, 0:57. Patriots 20–0. Drive: 8 plays, 37 yards, 3:34.
- MIA – Olindo Mare 36-yard field goal, 0:03. Patriots 20–3. Drive: 7 plays, 38 yards, 0:54.

Third quarter

- No scoring plays

Fourth quarter

- MIA – Olindo Mare 36-yard field goal, 13:41. Patriots 20–6. Drive: 10 plays, 58 yards, 2:48.
- MIA – Jeff Ogden 10-yard pass from Jay Fiedler (Olindo Mare kick), 1:28. Patriots 20–13. Drive: 10 plays, 79 yards, 2:32.

Top passers

- MIA – Jay Fiedler – 21/37, 320 yards, TD
- NE – Tom Brady – 11/19, 108 yards, TD

Top rushers

- MIA – Lamar Smith – 12 rushes, 33 yards
- NE – Antowain Smith – 26 rushes, 156 yards, TD

Top receivers

- MIA – Chris Chambers – 7 receptions, 124 yards
- NE – Troy Brown – 5 receptions, 59 yards

The Patriots defeated the Dolphins 20–13 for the first time since November 23, 1998 in the final regular season game for Foxboro Stadium. During halftime, Patriot greats of the past and present were paraded with each commemorating a season of the stadium's 31-season existence – John Hannah represented 1973 (the year he was drafted by New England), Steve Grogan represented 1976 (the year of the infamous "Ben Dreith game" against Oakland), Drew Bledsoe represented 1996 (the Super Bowl XXXI season), and so forth. During the game itself, Tom Brady caught a 23-yard pass from Kevin Faulk and threw for 109 yards himself, as the Patriots raced out to an early lead and held off a late Dolphins rally to earn sole 1st place in the AFC East and clinch their first playoff berth since 1998.

=== Week 17: at Carolina Panthers ===
Week 17: New England Patriots at Carolina Panthers – Game summary

| Quarter | 1 | 2 | 3 | 4 | Total |
|---|---|---|---|---|---|
| Patriots | 10 | 0 | 14 | 14 | 38 |
| Panthers | 0 | 3 | 3 | 0 | 6 |

at Ericsson Stadium, Charlotte, North Carolina

- Date: January 6, 2002
- Game time: 1:00 p.m. EST
- Game weather: Cloudy, 36 °F (2 °C)
- Game attendance: 71,907
- Referee: Tom White
- TV announcers (CBS): Kevin Harlan, Craig James & Beasley Reece

Game information

First quarter

- NE – Adam Vinatieri 19-yard field goal, 10:04. Patriots 3–0. Drive: 11 plays, 52 yards, 4:56.
- NE – Ty Law 46-yard interception return (Adam Vinatieri kick), 7:58. Patriots 10–0.

Second quarter

- CAR – John Kasay 29-yard field goal, 6:25. Patriots 10–3. Drive: 10 plays, 55 yards, 4:50.

Third quarter

- NE – Troy Brown 68-yard punt return (Adam Vinatieri kick), 8:30. Patriots 17–3.
- CAR – John Kasay 40-yard field goal, 4:46. Patriots 17–6. Drive: 7 plays, 48 yards, 3:44.
- NE – Antowain Smith 32-yard run (Adam Vinatieri kick), 1:29. Patriots 24–6. Drive: 6 plays, 63 yards, 3:17.

Fourth quarter

- NE – Jermaine Wiggins 5-yard pass from Tom Brady (Adam Vinatieri kick), 10:38. Patriots 31–6. Drive: 3 plays, 9 yards, 0:48.
- NE – Otis Smith 76-yard interception return (Adam Vinatieri kick), 5:45. Patriots 38–6.

Top passers

- NE – Tom Brady – 17/29, 198 yards, TD, 2 INT
- CAR – Chris Weinke – 15/36, 144 yards, 3 INT

Top rushers

- NE – Antowain Smith – 21 rushes, 81 yards, TD
- CAR – Richard Huntley – 21 rushes, 168 yards

Top receivers

- NE – David Patten – 4 receptions, 54 yards
- CAR – Brad Hoover – 4 receptions, 44 yards

With the win, the Patriots clinched both the AFC East for the first time since 1997, and the #2 seed in the AFC.

== Standings ==
AFC East
| | W | L | T | PCT | PF | PA | STK |
|---|---|---|---|---|---|---|---|
| ^{(2)} New England Patriots | 11 | 5 | 0 | .688 | 371 | 272 | W6 |
| ^{(4)} Miami Dolphins | 11 | 5 | 0 | .688 | 344 | 290 | W2 |
| ^{(6)} New York Jets | 10 | 6 | 0 | .625 | 308 | 295 | W1 |
| Indianapolis Colts | 6 | 10 | 0 | .375 | 413 | 486 | W1 |
| Buffalo Bills | 3 | 13 | 0 | .188 | 265 | 420 | L1 |

== Postseason results ==
=== AFC Divisional Playoffs: vs. (3) Oakland Raiders ===
AFC Divisional Playoffs: (3) Oakland Raiders at (2) New England Patriots – Game summary

| Quarter | 1 | 2 | 3 | 4 | OT | Total |
|---|---|---|---|---|---|---|
| Raiders | 0 | 7 | 6 | 0 | 0 | 13 |
| Patriots | 0 | 0 | 3 | 10 | 3 | 16 |

at Foxboro Stadium, Foxborough, Massachusetts

- Date: January 19, 2002
- Game time: 8:00 p.m. EST
- Game weather: Heavy snow, 19 °F (−7 °C)
- Game attendance: 60,292
- Referee: Walt Coleman
- TV announcers (CBS): Greg Gumbel, Phil Simms and Armen Keteyian

Game information

First quarter

- No scoring plays

Second quarter

- OAK – James Jett 13-yard pass from Rich Gannon (Sebastian Janikowski kick), 12:14. Raiders 7–0. Drive: 8 plays, 50 yards, 3:44.

Third quarter

- NE – Adam Vinatieri 23-yard field goal, 8:39. Raiders 7–3. Drive: 12 plays, 62 yards, 6:21.
- OAK – Sebastian Janikowski 38-yard field goal, 4:14. Raiders 10–3. Drive: 10 plays, 43 yards, 4:25.
- OAK – Sebastian Janikowski 45-yard field goal, 1:41. Raiders 13–3. Drive: 7 plays, 24 yards, 1:38.

Fourth quarter

- NE – Tom Brady 6-yard run (Adam Vinatieri kick), 7:52. Raiders 13–10. Drive: 10 plays, 67 yards, 4:37.
- NE – Adam Vinatieri 45-yard field goal, 0:27. Tied 13–13. Drive: 8 plays, 26 yards, 1:39.

Overtime

- NE – Adam Vinatieri 23-yard field goal, 6:31. Patriots 16–13. Drive: 15 plays, 61 yards, 8:29.

Top passers

- OAK – Rich Gannon – 17/31, 159 yards, TD
- NE – Tom Brady – 32/52, 312 yards, INT

Top rushers

- OAK – Charlie Garner – 17 rushes, 64 yards
- NE – Antowain Smith – 20 rushes, 65 yards

Top receivers

- OAK – Jerry Rice – 4 receptions, 48 yards
- NE – David Patten – 8 receptions, 107 yards

The game, the final one in the history of Foxboro Stadium, played in a heavy snowfall, will be remembered for a call near the end of the game, in which the referees initially ruled that New England quarterback Tom Brady had fumbled on a pass attempt, with Oakland protecting a three-point lead. Invoking the "tuck rule", where a ball is ruled an incomplete pass after the quarterback starts any forward motion, the referee overturned the decision after reviewing the instant replay, calling the drop an incomplete pass rather than a fumble.

Both teams struggled in the heavy snow storm during the first half, combining for the same number of punts as first downs (11) and converting only one of 13 third downs. However, Raiders quarterback Rich Gannon was efficient, completing 10 of 14 passes for 87 yards, including a 13-yard touchdown pass to James Jett early in the second quarter.

In the second half, things began to open up, especially for New England, who almost completely abandoned their running game and relied on Brady. He ended up completing 26 of 39 passes for 238 yards in the second half. On the opening drive of the third quarter, he led the Patriots 62 yards in 12 plays to the Raiders' 5-yard line, where Adam Vinatieri made a 23-yard field goal to cut the score, 7–3. Oakland responded with a 10-play, 43-yard drive, and scored a 38-yard field goal from Sebastian Janikowski. Then after forcing a punt, a 22-yard reception by receiver Jerry Rice set up Janikowski's second field goal, giving the Raiders a 13–3 lead with 2 minutes left in the third quarter.

In the fourth quarter, Brady led the Patriots on a 10-play, 67-yard drive, completing 9 consecutive passes for 61 yards and finishing it with a 6-yard touchdown run. Later in the quarter, the infamous "tuck" incident occurred. As Brady dropped back to pass, he lost the ball while being tackled by former college teammate Charles Woodson, and Oakland linebacker Greg Biekert recovered it with 1:43 left. However, an instant replay challenge caused referee Walt Coleman to overturn the fumble, ruling Brady's arm had been moving forward while being tackled and making the play an incomplete pass. Taking advantage of his second chance, Brady led the Patriots inside the Raiders' 30-yard line where Vinatieri made a 45-yard field goal with 27 seconds left, a dramatic kick through heavy snowfall that barely cleared the crossbar, sending the game into overtime.

New England won the coin toss and drove for the winning field goal on a possession that featured a risky fourth down and 4 conversion attempt from Brady, who threw a 6-yard pass to David Patten at the Raiders' 22-yard line to keep the drive alive. While Vinatieri's game-tying kick had the wind at his back, this drive was into the wind and the Patriots wanted to move closer. Following five runs from Antowain Smith and one from Brady, and after a drive of more than eight minutes, Vinatieri and holder Ken Walter cleared snow away from where the ball would be spotted. Vinatieri then gave New England its first lead of the game, making a 23-yard field goal to win.

=== AFC Championship Game: at (1) Pittsburgh Steelers ===
AFC Championship: (2) New England Patriots at (1) Pittsburgh Steelers – Game summary

| Quarter | 1 | 2 | 3 | 4 | Total |
|---|---|---|---|---|---|
| Patriots | 7 | 7 | 7 | 3 | 24 |
| Steelers | 0 | 3 | 14 | 0 | 17 |

at Heinz Field, Pittsburgh, Pennsylvania

- Date: January 27, 2002
- Game time: 12:30 p.m. EST
- Game weather: Partly sunny, 50 °F (10 °C)
- Game attendance: 64,704
- Referee: Ed Hochuli
- TV announcers (CBS): Greg Gumbel, Phil Simms, Armen Keteyian and Bonnie Bernstein

Game information

First quarter

- NE – Troy Brown 55-yard punt return (Adam Vinatieri kick), 3:42. Patriots 7–0.

Second quarter

- PIT – Kris Brown 30-yard field goal, 13:33. Patriots 7–3. Drive: 10 plays, 65 yards, 5:09.
- NE – David Patten 11-yard pass from Drew Bledsoe (Adam Vinatieri kick), 0:58. Patriots 14–3. Drive: 7 plays, 70 yards, 1:44.

Third quarter

- NE – Antwan Harris 49-yard blocked field goal return (Adam Vinatieri kick), 8:51. Patriots 21–3.
- PIT – Jerome Bettis 1-yard run (Kris Brown kick), 5:11. Patriots 21–10. Drive: 8 plays, 79 yards, 3:40.
- PIT – Amos Zereoue 11-yard run (Kris Brown kick), 1:29. Patriots 21–17. Drive: 5 plays, 32 yards, 1:41.

Fourth quarter

- NE – Adam Vinatieri 44-yard field goal, 11:12. Patriots 24–17. Drive: 11 plays, 45 yards, 5:17.

Top passers

- NE – Tom Brady – 12/18, 115 yards
- PIT – Kordell Stewart – 24/42, 255 yards, 3 INT

Top rushers

- NE – Antowain Smith – 15 rushes, 47 yards
- PIT – Kordell Stewart – 8 rushes, 41 yards

Top receivers

- NE – Troy Brown – 8 receptions, 121 yards
- PIT – Plaxico Buress – 5 receptions, 67 yards

The Patriots' storybook season continued as Drew Bledsoe came into the game in the second quarter in place of an injured Tom Brady – who replaced Bledsoe himself early in the season when he suffered a sheared blood vessel. The game was officiated by Ed Hochuli and the frequency of penalties in the game was criticized by both teams and by some media afterward.

Patriots receiver Troy Brown opened up the scoring with a 55-yard punt return touchdown with 3:42 left in the first quarter. Pittsburgh responded by driving 65 yards in 10 plays and scoring with a 30-yard field goal from Kris Brown. Later in the quarter, Brady completed a 28-yard pass to Brown at the Steelers 40-yard line, but was knocked out of the game on the play. Bledsoe took over without missing a beat, rushing for four yards and completing three passes to David Patten for 37 yards, the last one an 11-yard touchdown to give the Patriots a 14–3 lead.

On the first drive of the second half, New England linebacker Tedy Bruschi recovered a fumbled snap on the Steelers 35-yard line. But the Patriots gained only two yards on their next 4 plays and ended up turning the ball over on downs. Pittsburgh subsequently drove 52 yards to the 16-yard line to set up Brown's second field goal attempt, but this time his kick was blocked by defensive tackle Brandon Mitchell and Troy Brown recovered the ball. After returning it 11 yards, Brown threw a lateral pass to Antwan Harris, who took the ball the remaining 45 yards for a touchdown to increase New England's lead to 21–3.

The Steelers struck back with quarterback Kordell Stewart completing a 24-yard pass to Hines Ward and a 19-yard screen pass to Amos Zereoué on an 8-play, 79-yard drive. Jerome Bettis finished it off with a 1-yard touchdown run, cutting the score to 21–10 with 5:11 left in the third quarter. New England was forced to punt after linebacker Jason Gildon sacked Bledsoe on third down, and Troy Edwards returned the punt 28 yards to the Patriots 32-yard line. Five plays later, Zereoue scored with an 11-yard touchdown run, making the score 21–17.

Early in the fourth quarter, Adam Vinatieri's 44-yard field goal increased New England's lead to 24–17. Later in the period, the Patriots made two key stops to clinch the victory. First, safety Tebucky Jones intercepted a pass from Stewart and returned it 19 yards to the Steelers 34-yard line. Pittsburgh's defense managed to prevent a first down and Vinatieri missed a 50-yard field goal attempt that would have sealed the game, giving the Steelers the ball back on their own 40-yard line, but a few plays later, Lawyer Milloy intercepted a pass from Stewart with 2:02 left to seal the game, and the Patriots were able to run out the rest of the clock.

The win was the 300th career victory, encompassing the regular season and postseason, in Patriots franchise history.

=== Super Bowl XXXVI vs. (N1) St. Louis Rams ===
Super Bowl XXXVI: (N1) St. Louis Rams vs. (A2) New England Patriots – Game summary

| Quarter | 1 | 2 | 3 | 4 | Total |
|---|---|---|---|---|---|
| Rams | 3 | 0 | 0 | 14 | 17 |
| Patriots | 0 | 14 | 3 | 3 | 20 |

at Louisiana Superdome, New Orleans, Louisiana

- Date: February 3, 2002
- Game time: 5:30 p.m. CST
- Game weather: Played indoors (dome stadium)
- Game attendance: 72,922
- Referee: Bernie Kukar
- TV announcers (Fox): Pat Summerall, John Madden, Ron Pitts and Pam Oliver

Game information

First quarter

- STL – Jeff Wilkins 50-yard field goal, 3:10. Rams 3–0. Drive: 10 plays, 48 yards, 5:05.

Second quarter

- NE – Ty Law 47-yard interception return (Adam Vinatieri kick), 8:49. Patriots 7–3.
- NE – David Patten 8-yard pass from Tom Brady (Adam Vinatieri kick), 0:31. Patriots 14–3. Drive: 5 plays, 40 yards, 0:49.

Third quarter

- NE – Adam Vinatieri 37-yard field goal, 1:18. Patriots 17–3. Drive: 5 plays, 14 yards, 2:07.

Fourth quarter

- STL – Kurt Warner 2-yard run (Jeff Wilkins kick), 9:31. Patriots 17–10. Drive: 12 plays, 77 yards, 6:47.
- STL – Ricky Proehl 26-yard pass from Kurt Warner (Jeff Wilkins kick), 1:30. Tied 17–17. Drive: 3 plays, 55 yards, 0:21.
- NE – Adam Vinatieri 48-yard field goal, 0:00. Patriots 20–17. Drive: 9 plays, 53 yards, 1:30.

Top passers

- STL – Kurt Warner – 28/44, 365 yards, TD, 2 INT
- NE – Tom Brady – 16/27, 145 yards, TD

Top rushers

- STL – Marshall Faulk – 17 rushes, 76 yards
- NE – Antowain Smith – 18 rushes, 92 yards

Top receivers

- STL – Az-Zahir Hakim – 5 receptions, 90 yards
- NE – Troy Brown – 6 receptions, 89 yards

The Rams scored first midway through the first quarter, driving 48 yards in 10 plays to set up a 50-yard field goal by kicker Jeff Wilkins. At the time, the field goal was the third longest in Super Bowl history. The rest of the quarter was scoreless.

Early in the second quarter, the Rams drove to New England's 34-yard line, but quarterback Kurt Warner threw an incompletion on third down, and Wilkins' subsequent 52-yard field goal attempt sailed wide left.

With 8:49 left in the second quarter, New England cornerback Ty Law intercepted a pass intended for receiver Isaac Bruce and scored on a 47-yard return to give the Patriots a 7–3 lead. With less than two minutes left in the first half, Warner completed a pass to receiver Ricky Proehl at the Patriots 40-yard line, but New England defensive back Antwan Harris forced a fumble while tackling him, which was recovered by Patriots defensive back Terrell Buckley. New England quarterback Tom Brady would lead a drive that culminated with an 8-yard touchdown pass to receiver David Patten with 31 seconds left in the half to give New England a 14–3 halftime lead. This was the first time in the 2001 season that St. Louis fell behind in a game by more than eight points.

The Patriots took the opening kickoff of the second half, but could only reach the St. Louis 43-yard line before being forced to punt. Aided by a 20-yard reception by wide receiver Az-Zahir Hakim, a 22-yard reception by Bruce, and a defensive pass interference penalty on Patriots defensive back Otis Smith, the Rams advanced to the New England 41-yard line. However, on the next play, linebacker Mike Vrabel and defensive lineman Richard Seymour sacked Warner for a 9-yard loss. Warner then threw 2 consecutive incomplete passes, which resulted in the Rams punting.

Later in the third quarter, Otis Smith intercepted a pass intended for Rams wide receiver Torry Holt after Holt slipped while coming off the line of scrimmage, and returned the ball 30 yards to the Rams 33-yard line. Though St. Louis' defense did not give up a touchdown to the Patriots, kicker Adam Vinatieri made a 37-yard field goal to increase New England's lead to 17–3.

The Rams responded by driving to the Patriots' 3-yard line on their ensuing drive. On fourth-and-goal, the Rams attempted to score a touchdown, calling for a quarterback sneak by Warner. Warner fumbled the ball while being tackled by linebacker Roman Phifer, which was recovered by defensive back Tebucky Jones who returned it 97 yards for a touchdown that would have increased the Patriots lead to 23–3. However, the play was nullified by a holding penalty on linebacker Willie McGinest, which in turn gave the Rams a first down on the 1-yard line instead. On second down, Warner scored on a 2-yard touchdown run to make the score 17–10, Patriots.

After Warner's touchdown, the Rams defense forced the Patriots to a three-and-out. St. Louis then drove from their own 7-yard line to the New England 36-yard line, aided by a 30-yard reception by Proehl. However, McGinest sacked Warner for a 16-yard loss on second down, pushing the Rams back to their 46-yard line. St. Louis ended up punting after Warner's third down pass was incomplete.

The Rams forced New England to another three-and-out, and got the ball back on their own 45-yard line with 1:51 left in the game. Warner threw three consecutive completions: an 18-yard pass to Hakim, an 11-yard one to receiver Yo Murphy, and finally a 26-yard touchdown completion to Proehl that tied the game 17–17 with 1:30 left in the fourth quarter.

The Patriots had no timeouts left for their ensuing drive, which resulted in color commentator John Madden initially suggesting that the Patriots should run out the clock and attempt to win in overtime. Instead, New England attempted to get the winning score in regulation on the final drive. Brady opened the drive with three completions to running back J.R. Redmond, which moved the ball to their 41-yard line with 33 seconds left. After an incomplete pass, Brady completed a clutch 23-yard pass to wide receiver Troy Brown, and followed it up with a 6-yard completion to tight end Jermaine Wiggins to advance to the Rams' 30-yard line. Brady then spiked the ball with seven seconds left, which set up Vinatieri's 48-yard field goal attempt. Vinatieri's game-winning kick was successful, marking the first time in Super Bowl history that a game was won by a score on the final play.
