= Tuck Rule Game =

2002 NFL playoff game

Coordinates: 42.09269°N 71.26744°W

2001 AFC Divisional Playoff game
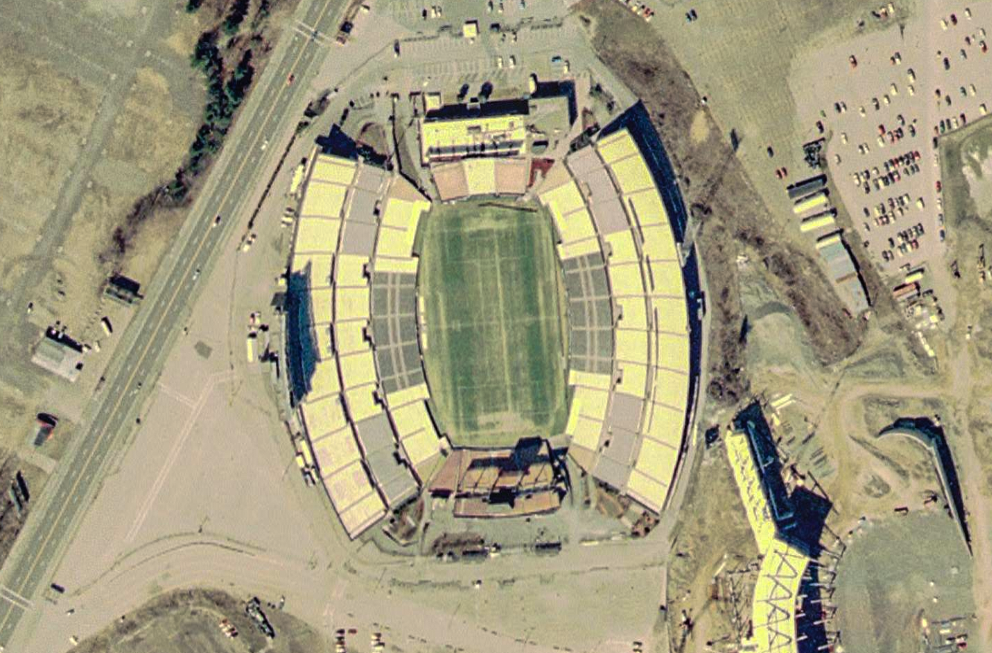
- Foxboro Stadium, site of the game
Oakland Raiders (3) (10–6)	New England Patriots (2) (11–5)
13	16
Head coach: Jon Gruden	Head coach: Bill Belichick
	1	2	3	4	OT	Total
OAK	0	7	6	0	0	13
NE	0	0	3	10	3	16
- Date: January 19, 2002
- Stadium: Foxboro Stadium; Foxborough, Massachusetts
- Favorite: Patriots by 3
- Referee: Walt Coleman
- Attendance: 60,292

TV in the United States
- Network: CBS
- Announcers: Greg Gumbel and Phil Simms

The 2001 AFC Divisional Playoff game, also known as the Tuck Rule Game or the Snow Bowl, and sometimes referred to as Snow Bowl 2, was a National Football League (NFL) playoff game between the New England Patriots and the Oakland Raiders. Part of the second round of the 2001–02 NFL playoffs, the game was played on January 19, 2002 at Foxboro Stadium in Foxborough, Massachusetts, at the time the Patriots' home stadium, and was the last game ever played at the stadium. There was a heavy snowfall during the game.

The name Tuck Rule Game originates from the controversial play that changed the course of the game. In the fourth quarter, Raiders' cornerback Charles Woodson tackled Patriots' quarterback Tom Brady, causing what game officials initially ruled to be a fumble that was recovered by Raiders' linebacker Greg Biekert. However, upon review of the play, officials eventually determined that even though Brady had seemingly halted his passing motion and was attempting to "tuck" the ball back into his body, it was an incomplete pass and not a fumble under the then-effective NFL rules. As a result, the original call was overturned; had it stood, the play would have sealed a victory for the Raiders. The ball was instead given back to the Patriots, who subsequently moved it into field goal range. With under a minute remaining in regulation time, Patriots' placekicker Adam Vinatieri kicked a 45-yard field goal to tie the game at 13, sending the game into overtime. In the overtime, Vinatieri kicked a 23-yard field goal to win the game for the Patriots. New England went on to win Super Bowl XXXVI, beginning a run of championships with Brady and head coach Bill Belichick, appearing in nine Super Bowls and winning six. Due to the game's controversial call, dramatic overtime finish, and significance in kickstarting the Patriots' dynasty, it is regarded as one of the most famous and consequential games in league history and as an important part of NFL lore.

== Background ==
The Tuck Rule Game was played as part of the 2001–02 NFL playoffs, which would crown the NFL champion for the 2001 season. Under the playoff structure in place at the time, six teams from each of the NFL's two conferences – the AFC and NFC – qualified for the playoffs. These six teams would consist of the champions of each of the three divisions of each conference (the East, Central, and West), plus three wild card teams, which were the three teams who finished with the best win–loss record in each conference who were not division champions. These six teams would be seeded 1–6 based on win–loss record for purposes of playoff bracketing, with the three division champions seeded 1–3 and the three wild card qualifiers seeded 4–6.

The playoff system stipulated that the top two division winners in each conference would receive a first-round bye into the second round of the playoffs (the divisional playoff), while the third, fourth, fifth, and sixth-ranked teams would play in the first round of the playoffs (the wild card playoff), with the #3 seed playing the #6 seed and the #4 seed squaring off against the #5 seed. The victors of the wild card playoff games would then face the top two seeds in the divisional playoff, with the #1 seed facing the lowest-surviving seed from the wild card playoff and the #2 seed pairing off against the other wild card playoff winner.

The AFC East champion Patriots were the #2 seed in the AFC playoffs, having posted an 11–5 win–loss record during the 2001 season. Although the Miami Dolphins had also compiled an 11–5 record during the regular season, New England was awarded the division title and first-round bye as the #2 seed due to having a better division record than Miami (6–2 compared to the Dolphins' 5–3); the Dolphins instead qualified for the playoffs as a wild card team and the #4 seed. The season had been wild for the Patriots, who began the year 0–2 after veteran quarterback Drew Bledsoe suffered a sheared blood vessel in his chest in the Week 2 game against the New York Jets. Backup quarterback Tom Brady then led the offense to a playoff berth. As the #2 seed, the Patriots earned a bye into the divisional playoff.

The Raiders had clinched the AFC West division title with a 10–6 regular-season record and qualified as the #3 seed in the AFC playoffs. As such, they played the Jets (a #6 seeded wild-card team) in an AFC wild-card playoff game on January 12 at Network Associates Coliseum, in which they emerged victorious, 38–24. With the Jets eliminated, the Patriots would face the Raiders in the one divisional playoff game and the Pittsburgh Steelers would face the winner of Baltimore Ravens, the #5 seed, and the #4 seeded Miami Dolphins as the lowest-remaining seed. The Ravens beat the Dolphins 20–3 in the other wild-card playoff game.

== The game ==
Both teams struggled in the heavy snowstorm during the first half, combining for the same number of punts as first downs (11) and converting only one of 13 third downs. Nonetheless, Raiders quarterback Rich Gannon completed 10 of 14 passes for 87 yards. With 1:12 left in the first quarter, a 15-yard fair-catch interference penalty against Patriots defensive back Je'Rod Cherry at the end of Ken Walter's 39-yard punt gave Oakland a first down at midfield, where they drove to a 7–0 lead on Gannon's 13-yard touchdown pass to James Jett. A few plays later, Raiders defensive back Johnnie Harris intercepted a pass from Brady on the Patriots 41-yard line, but New England's defense managed to force a punt, which would be the final result of every following drive from either team until the end of the half.

In the second half, New England almost completely abandoned its running game and relied on Brady's passing. On the opening drive of the third quarter, he connected with David Patten for gains of 25 and 19 yards as he led the Patriots 62 yards in 12 plays to the Raiders' 5-yard line, where Adam Vinatieri made a 23-yard field goal to make it 7–3. Terry Kirby returned the ensuing kickoff 22 yards to the Oakland 37-yard line and the Raiders produced a 10-play, 43-yard drive to score on a 38-yard field goal from Sebastian Janikowski. Then, after a 33-yard punt by Walter gave the Raiders a first down on their own 49, a 22-yard reception by receiver Jerry Rice set up Janikowski's second field goal, from 45 yards, giving the Raiders a 13–3 lead with two minutes left in the third quarter.

The Raiders appeared to be dominating to this point of the game. However, in the fourth quarter, Brady led the Patriots on a 10-play, 67-yard drive, completing nine consecutive passes for 61 yards and finishing it with a 6-yard touchdown run with 7:57 left that made the score 13–10. Later in the quarter, Patriots receiver Troy Brown returned Shane Lechler's 37-yard punt 27 yards to the Patriots 46-yard line. Brown fumbled the ball at the end of the return, but Pats linebacker Larry Izzo recovered it with 2:06 left on the clock. Brady then completed a seven-yard pass to Kevin Faulk before scrambling for five yards and running out of bounds to the Patriots' sideline, picking up a first down at the Oakland 42. New England had no timeouts left, but with the clock stopped, Brady here had a short conversation with offensive coordinator Charlie Weis.

=== The "tuck rule" play and call ===
With 1:50 left, Raiders cornerback Eric Allen, lurking at the Patriots' sideline, heard Brady's talk with Weis. Allen stated that he heard the Patriots' play call; he then rushed to his sideline and told his team what he had heard. While the Patriots were slightly out of field-goal range, Brady dropped back to pass, with no open receivers. While pumping the football, Brady was hit on his right side by blitzing Raiders cornerback Charles Woodson (his former college teammate at Michigan). While it appeared that Brady had tucked the ball back towards his body, the officials were not sure and ruled it a fumble so they could review the play.

In 1999, a new rule had been introduced, which eventually became known as the tuck rule:

NFL Rule 3, Section 22, Article 2, Note 2. When [an offensive] player is holding the ball to pass it forward, any intentional forward movement of his arm starts a forward pass, even if the player loses possession of the ball as he is attempting to tuck it back toward his body. Also, if the player has tucked the ball into his body and then loses possession, it is a fumble.

The tackle that generated controversy

After a video-replay review, referee Walt Coleman reversed the call, declaring the play an incomplete forward-pass and giving possession back to the Patriots. Coleman's announcement stated that the ball was moving forward at the time at which it was dropped. Thus, the original call was overturned, and the Patriots maintained possession.

Because the play was initially ruled a fumble, instant-replay rules required the referee to see "incontrovertible visual evidence" on the replay that Brady had not "tucked the ball into his body and then {lost} possession" of it before reversing the original call on the field. In 2012, on the ten-year anniversary of the game, Coleman told ESPN that he did not see Brady lose the ball, and, as NFL referees were trained to do in this situation, ruled it a fumble because that call could be reviewed while an incomplete pass could not. Once he saw a replay, Coleman quickly reversed his previous ruling, telling ESPN it was an "easy" call.

This was not the first time the Patriots had seen the tuck rule invoked in the 2001 NFL season. On September 23, Patriots defensive end Anthony Pleasant apparently forced Jets quarterback Vinny Testaverde to fumble, but the call was overturned upon review and ruled an incomplete pass. In the aftermath of the Tuck Rule Game, Patriots head coach Bill Belichick explained, "I knew what the ruling should have been because we had dealt with that play a little bit earlier in the year on the other side of it."

The Raiders complained extensively that the call was wrong, and that it was made against them because the league had a vendetta against the team, an attitude Raiders quarterback Rich Gannon said was "totally nonsense." Several Raiders players and observers also said that the Tuck Rule led to head coach Jon Gruden's departure from the team, as owner Al Davis was apparently angry that Gruden did not protest the call vehemently enough. Gruden was dismissive of Davis' views on the matter, and the subsequent breakdown in relations between owner and coach led to Gruden being traded to Tampa Bay and becoming their head coach in 2002. (Gruden would return to the Raiders in 2018 after spending a stint as a broadcaster with ESPN.)

The tuck rule was abolished on March 20, 2013, by a 29–1 vote of current teams. The Pittsburgh Steelers voted against abolition, while two teams, the Patriots and Washington Redskins, abstained from the vote. Patriots owner Robert Kraft noted, "I know Al Davis, may he rest in peace, is probably smiling."

=== Conclusion of game after the ruling ===
After the Patriots maintained possession, Brady completed a 13-yard pass to David Patten to the Raiders' 29. After two incomplete passes and a Brady scramble, Vinatieri came on to hit a game-tying 45-yard field goal through the snow with just 27 seconds left, a kick considered to have been one of the most difficult kicks in NFL history, or the most "clutch-kick ever." With seconds left on the clock after the ensuing kickoff, the Raiders decided not to attempt to advance the ball, instead letting it go to overtime.

The Patriots won the toss and took the ball to start overtime. They drove 61 yards in 15 plays, with Brady completing all eight of his pass attempts, for a total of 45 yards. On fourth down and 4 from the Raiders' 28, Brady hit Patten for a six-yard completion. Three plays later, Antowain Smith picked up eight yards for a first down at the Oakland 9 and the Patriots, now going against the wind, fought to set up the game-winning kick. After Brady dove to the 5 and centered the ball, Vinatieri kicked a 23-yard field goal, giving the Patriots a 16–13 victory and advancing them to the AFC Championship Game. Brady ended up completing 26 of 39 passes for 238 yards in the second half.

=== Statistics ===
2001 AFC Divisional Round: Oakland Raiders at New England Patriots

Quarter	1	2	3	4	OT	Total
Raiders	0	7	6	0	0	13
Patriots	0	0	3	10	3	16

at Foxboro Stadium, Foxborough, Massachusetts

- Date: January 19, 2002
- Game time: 8:05 p.m. EST
- Game weather: 25 °F or −3.9 °C, snow
- Game attendance: 60,292
- Referee: Walt Coleman
- TV announcers (CBS): Greg Gumbel and Phil Simms
- Boxscore

Game information

First quarter

- No scoring plays

Second quarter

- OAK James Jett 13 yard pass from Gannon (Sebastian Janikowski kick)

Third quarter

- NE Adam Vinatieri 23 yard FG
- OAK Janikowski 38 yard FG
- OAK Janikowski 45 yard FG

Fourth quarter

- NE Brady 6 yard run (Vinatieri kick)
- NE Vinatieri 45 yard FG

Overtime

- NE Vinatieri 23 yard FG

Top passers

- OAK – Rich Gannon – 17/31, 159 YDS, TD
- NE – Tom Brady – 32/52, 312 YDS, INT

Top rushers

- OAK – Charlie Garner – 17 CAR, 64 YDS
- NE – Antowain Smith – 20 CAR, 65 YDS

Top receivers

- OAK – Jerry Rice – 4 REC, 48 YDS
- NE – David Patten – 8 REC, 107 YDS

==== Starting lineups ====
Hall of Fame‡

Oakland	Position	New England
Offense
Tim Brown‡	WR	Troy Brown
Barry Sims	LT	Matt Light
Steve Wisniewski	LG	Mike Compton
Adam Treu	C	Damien Woody
Frank Middleton	RG	Joe Andruzzi
Lincoln Kennedy	RT	Greg Robinson-Randall
Roland Williams	TE	Rod Rutledge
Jerry Rice‡	WR	David Patten
Rich Gannon	QB	Tom Brady
Charlie Garner	RB	Antowain Smith
Jon Ritchie	FB	Marc Edwards
Defense
Regan Upshaw	LE	Bobby Hamilton
Rod Coleman	LDT	Brandon Mitchell
Grady Jackson	RDT	Riddick Parker
Tony Bryant	RE	Anthony Pleasant
William Thomas	LOLB	Mike Vrabel
Greg Biekert	MLB	Tedy Bruschi
Elijah Alexander	ROLB	Roman Phifer
Charles Woodson‡	LCB	Ty Law‡
Eric Allen‡	RCB	Otis Smith
Johnnie Harris	SS	Lawyer Milloy
Anthony Dorsett	FS	Tebucky Jones

==== Officials ====
- Referee: Walt Coleman (#65)
- Umpire: Undrey Wash (#96)
- Head linesman: Dale Williams (#8)
- Line judge: Gary Arthur (#108)
- Field judge: Scott Edwards (#3)
- Side judge: Dean Look (#49)
- Back judge: Phil Luckett (#59)

== Aftermath ==
The Patriots went on to defeat the Pittsburgh Steelers, 24–17, in the AFC Championship Game, and then defeated the NFC champion St. Louis Rams, 20–17, in Super Bowl XXXVI on a last-second field goal by Vinatieri. The Super Bowl championship was the first in Patriots' history and began a period of dominance for the team in the 2000s and 2010s that included eight additional Super Bowl appearances with five more titles, in Super Bowls XXXVIII, XXXIX, XLIX, LI, and LIII.

The Tuck Rule Game was Gruden's last contest of his first stint as Raider head coach; he was traded to the Tampa Bay Buccaneers before the following season. The Raiders went to the Super Bowl the next year, but were beaten by Gruden's Buccaneers, 48–21, and did not make the playoffs again until 2016. In 2018, Gruden returned to coach the Raiders after a nine-year stint as a television analyst. He made reference to the Tuck Rule Game in his introductory press conference upon his return to the Raiders, turning to former Raiders cornerback Charles Woodson and saying, "Brady fumbled that ball." Brady himself has also suggested that the play "might have been a fumble."

Up to his retirement at the end of the 2018 season, Coleman officiated 265 more NFL games, including 21 more involving the Patriots, but none involving the Raiders. As it happened, his last game involved the Patriots.

As for Tom Brady, he went on to have a massive career-winning seven Super Bowls: Super Bowls XXXVI, XXXVIII, XXXIX, XLIX, LI, LIII, and LV. After his retirement, he went on to become an NFL analyst with Fox, as well as a minority stakeholder in the Raiders franchise – the team he beat in the Tuck Rule game.

== See also ==
- 1976-77 NFL playoffs (the Patriots and Raiders played a divisional round game that featured a controversial, last minute roughing the passer penalty against the Patriots' Ray "Sugar Bear" Hamilton)
- Snowplow Game
- Immaculate Reception
- Red Right 88
- List of nicknamed NFL games and plays
