= J. R. Redmond =

American football player (born 1977)

No. 21, 27
- Positions: Running back, fullback

Personal information
- Born: September 28, 1977 (age 49); Carson, California, U.S.
- Listed height: 6 ft 0 in (1.83 m)
- Listed weight: 213 lb (97 kg)

Career information
- High school: Carson
- College: Arizona State
- NFL draft: 2000: 3rd round, 76th overall pick

Career history
- New England Patriots (2000–2002); Oakland Raiders (2003–2004); Arizona Cardinals (2005)

Awards and highlights
- Super Bowl champion (XXXVI); 3× First-team All-Pac-10 (1997–1999)

Career NFL statistics
- Rushing yards: 676
- Rushing average: 3.5
- Rushing touchdowns: 1
- Receptions: 68
- Receiving yards: 502
- Receiving touchdowns: 2
- Stats at Pro Football Reference

Joseph Robert Redmond (born September 28, 1977) is an American former professional football player who was a running back in the National Football League (NFL). He played college football for the Arizona State Sun Devils and was selected by the New England Patriots in the third round of the 2000 NFL draft. He played in the NFL for New England and the Oakland Raiders, and won Super Bowl XXXVI as a member of the Patriots over the St. Louis Rams.

== College career ==
As a senior at Arizona State University, he was a Heisman Trophy and Doak Walker award candidate, and was one of the premier kick returners in the country. He ranks third in ASU history with 3,299 career rushing yards. His total career yardage ranks 26th in Pac-10 history.

- 1997: 142 carries for 805 yards with 7 TD. 15 catches for 186 yards with 1 TD.
- 1998: 166 carries for 833 yards with 11 TD. 22 catches for 194 yards.
- 1999: 241 carries for 1,174 yards with 12 TD. 15 catches for 100 yards with 1 TD.

== Professional career ==
Redmond was selected in the third round of the 2000 NFL draft. Redmond is best known for his role on the 2001 New England Patriots. Redmond caught three passes in the Patriots' game-winning overtime drive during the famous "Snow Bowl" playoff game against the Oakland Raiders. He also caught three passes on the Patriots' game-winning drive at the end of Super Bowl XXXVI; most notably, with the Patriots on their own 30-yard line with 41 seconds left, Redmond caught a 3-yard dump-down pass from quarterback Tom Brady, dodged a tackler to pass the first down marker and then dragged a second tackler to the sideline, extending the ball out of bounds to stop the clock. The 11-yard gain and stopped clock allowed the Patriots to keep the drive alive and led, plays later, to a Patriots victory on an Adam Vinatieri field goal. Charlie Weis, the Patriots offensive coordinator at the time, has said that he would have recommended playing for overtime had Redmond not gotten the first down or failed to get out of bounds and stop the clock.

== NFL career statistics ==
Legend
| **Bold** | Career high |

=== Regular season ===
| Year | Team | Games | | Rushing | | | | | Receiving | | | | |
| Year | Team | GP | GS | Att | Yds | Avg | Lng | TD | Rec | Yds | Avg | Lng | TD |
|---|---|---|---|---|---|---|---|---|---|---|---|---|---|
| 2000 | NE | 12 | **5** | **125** | **406** | 3.2 | **20** | **1** | 20 | 126 | 6.3 | 20 | **2** |
| 2001 | NE | 12 | 0 | 35 | 119 | 3.4 | 16 | 0 | 13 | 132 | **10.2** | 17 | 0 |
| 2002 | NE | 9 | 0 | 4 | 2 | 0.5 | 5 | 0 | 2 | 5 | 2.5 | 3 | 0 |
| 2003 | OAK | 1 | 0 | 9 | 30 | 3.3 | 9 | 0 | 1 | 6 | 6.0 | 6 | 0 |
| 2004 | OAK | **16** | 1 | 21 | 119 | **5.7** | 18 | 0 | **32** | **233** | 7.3 | **22** | 0 |
| Career | | 50 | 6 | 194 | 676 | 3.5 | 20 | 1 | 68 | 502 | 7.4 | 22 | 2 |

=== Playoffs ===
| Year | Team | Games | | Rushing | | | | | Receiving | | | | |
| Year | Team | GP | GS | Att | Yds | Avg | Lng | TD | Rec | Yds | Avg | Lng | TD |
|---|---|---|---|---|---|---|---|---|---|---|---|---|---|
| 2001 | NE | **3** | 0 | **7** | **6** | **0.9** | **7** | 0 | **9** | **69** | **7.7** | **20** | 0 |
| Career | | 3 | 0 | 7 | 6 | 0.9 | 7 | 0 | 9 | 69 | 7.7 | 20 | 0 |
