= Antwan Harris =

American football player (born 1977)

No. 23
- Position: Safety

Personal information
- Born: May 29, 1977 (age 49); Raleigh, North Carolina, U.S.

Career information
- High school: Ravenscroft (Raleigh, North Carolina)
- College: Virginia
- NFL draft: 2000: 6th round, 187th overall pick

Career history
- New England Patriots (2000–2004); Cleveland Browns (2005)

Awards and highlights
- 3× Super Bowl champion (XXXVI, XXXVIII, XXXIX)

Career NFL statistics
- Tackles: 52
- Interceptions: 1
- Sacks: 1
- Stats at Pro Football Reference

Melvin Antwan Harris (born May 29, 1977) is an American former professional football player who was a safety for six seasons for the New England Patriots and Cleveland Browns of the National Football League (NFL). He was selected by the Patriots in the sixth round of the 2000 NFL draft. He won three Super Bowls with the Patriots in 2001, 2003 and 2004. He is best remembered for taking a lateral from Troy Brown after a blocked field goal and running 49 yards for a touchdown in the 2001 AFC Championship game against the Pittsburgh Steelers.

In Super Bowl XXXVI, Harris made a crucial play, forcing a fumble by Rams receiver Ricky Proehl, which was recovered by teammate Terrell Buckley and returned to the Rams' 25-yard line, setting up the Patriots' only offensive touchdown of the game, a pass from Tom Brady to David Patten that brought the Patriots' lead to 14–3.

== NFL career statistics ==
Legend
**Bold**	Career high

=== Regular season ===
Year	Team	Games		Tackles					Interceptions					Fumbles			
Year	Team	GP	GS	Cmb	Solo	Ast	Sck	TFL	Int	Yds	TD	Lng	PD	FF	FR	Yds	TD
2000	NE	14	0	10	8	2	**1.0**	**1**	**1**	**11**	0	**11**	**1**	0	**1**	0	0
2001	NE	11	1	7	4	3	0.0	0	0	0	0	0	**1**	0	0	0	0
2002	NE	14	0	15	**13**	2	0.0	0	0	0	0	0	0	0	0	0	0
2003	NE	13	1	**20**	12	**8**	0.0	0	0	0	0	0	**1**	0	0	0	0
Career		52	2	52	37	15	1.0	1	1	11	0	11	3	0	1	0	0

=== Playoffs ===
Year	Team	Games		Tackles					Interceptions					Fumbles			
Year	Team	GP	GS	Cmb	Solo	Ast	Sck	TFL	Int	Yds	TD	Lng	PD	FF	FR	Yds	TD
2001	NE	3	0	4	4	0	0.0	0	0	0	0	0	0	0	0	0	0
Career		3	0	4	4	0	0.0	0	0	0	0	0	0	0	0	0	0
