= Jace Sayler =

American football player (born 1979)

Profile
- Position: Defensive tackle

Personal information
- Born: February 27, 1979 (age 47); Rockford, Illinois, U.S.
- Listed height: 6 ft 5 in (1.96 m)
- Listed weight: 295 lb (134 kg)

Career information
- College: Michigan State

Career history
- 2001: New England Patriots
- 2003: Washington Redskins*
- 2003: San Francisco 49ers
- * Offseason or practice squad member only
- Stats at Pro Football Reference

James M. "Jace" Sayler (born February 27, 1979) is an American former professional football defensive tackle. He was signed by the New England Patriots as an undrafted free agent in 2001. He played college football at Michigan State.

Sayler was also a member of the Washington Redskins and San Francisco 49ers.

After Sayler's career-ending back injury with the 49ers, he has undergone multiple operations over the years. While traveling for treatments and therapy for his back he met his wife Christine. Jace and Christine have two children and currently reside in the Midwest where they raise their family.

== Early life ==
Sayler played high school football at McHenry High School West Campus in McHenry, Illinois, where he was an all-state selection at tight end and defensive end.

== College career ==
After graduating from high school, Sayler attended Michigan State University. Sayler switched to defensive tackle in his junior season of 1999, finishing with 46 tackles and three sacks. He started every game of his senior season in 2000, recording 53 tackles.

== Professional career ==
=== New England Patriots ===
Sayler was signed as an undrafted free agent by the New England Patriots after going undrafted in the 2001 NFL draft. Sayler made the Patriots' 53-man roster out of training camp and started the 2001 season opener in place of an injured Richard Seymour at nose tackle. He played in two games for the Patriots before being placed on injured reserve on October 5. He was re-signed by the Patriots following the season, but was released on September 1, 2002. He was signed to the Patriots' practice squad two days later, and released again on September 5. He spent the 2002 season out of football.

=== Washington Redskins ===
Sayler was signed by the Washington Redskins on January 2, 2003, and released from the team on July 25, 2003.

=== San Francisco 49ers ===
Sayler was signed by the San Francisco 49ers on August 15, 2003, and waived/injured on August 26, 2003, after suffering a back injury.
