= Grant Williams (American football) =

American football player and coach (born 1974)

No. 69, 79, 76, 77
- Position: Offensive tackle

Personal information
- Born: May 10, 1974 (age 52); Hattiesburg, Mississippi, U.S.
- Listed height: 6 ft 8 in (2.03 m)
- Listed weight: 320 lb (145 kg)

Career information
- High school: Clinton (MS)
- College: Louisiana Tech
- NFL draft: 1996: undrafted

Career history

Playing
- Seattle Seahawks (1996–1999); New England Patriots (2000–2001); St. Louis Rams (2002–2004)

Coaching
- Lindenwood (2017–2019) Assistant coach; St. Louis BattleHawks (2020) Offensive line assistant; Lipscomb Academy (2023–present) Offensive line coach

Awards and highlights
- Super Bowl champion (XXXVI)

Career NFL statistics
- Games played: 122
- Games started: 49
- Fumble recoveries: 2
- Stats at Pro Football Reference

Grant James Williams (born May 10, 1974) is an American football coach and offensive tackle who played nine seasons in the National Football League (NFL). He was a member of the Super Bowl XXXVI-winning New England Patriots in 2002. Williams attended Clinton High School in Clinton, Mississippi and was a letterman in football, basketball, baseball, and track and field. He played college football at Louisiana Tech University.

== Professional career ==
Pre-draft measurables
Height	Weight	Arm length	Hand span	40-yard dash	10-yard split	20-yard split	20-yard shuttle	Vertical jump
6 ft 7 3/4 in (2.03 m)	322 lb (146 kg)	34 5/8 in (0.88 m)	9 1/2 in (0.24 m)	5.6 s	1.94 s	3.27 s	4.79 s	23.5 in (0.60 m)
All values from NFL Combine

Signed by the Seattle Seahawks in 1996 after going undrafted in the 1996 NFL draft, Grant spent 4 years with the team before going to the New England Patriots. During his 2-year stint with the Patriots, he would win Super Bowl XXXVI in 2001 when the Patriots beat the Rams 20–17. In 2002, he joined the St. Louis Rams, where he spent the final 3 seasons of his career with before retiring.

== Coaching career ==
In 2019, he was hired by the St. Louis BattleHawks of the XFL as assistant offensive line coach. Prior to the XFL, he was in the same position at Lindenwood University.

== Personals life ==
Grant is married; he and his wife Emily have several children. He is currently the chaplain to the St. Louis Cardinals through Athletes in Action.
