= Leonard Myers (American football) =

American football player (1978–2017)

No. 25
- Position: Cornerback

Personal information
- Born: December 18, 1978; Fort Lauderdale, Florida, U.S.
- Died: February 17, 2017 (aged 38); Fort Lauderdale, Florida, U.S.
- Listed height: 5 ft 10 in (1.78 m)
- Listed weight: 198 lb (90 kg)

Career information
- High school: Dillard (Fort Lauderdale)
- College: Miami (FL)
- NFL draft: 2001: 6th round, 200th overall pick

Career history
- New England Patriots (2001–2003); New Orleans Saints (2003)*; New York Jets (2003); Detroit Lions (2003); Ottawa Renegades (2005)
- * Offseason or practice squad member only

Awards and highlights
- Super Bowl champion (XXXVI)

Career NFL statistics
- Tackles: 24
- Passes defended: 2
- Stats at Pro Football Reference

Leonard Bernard Myers Jr. (December 18, 1978 – February 17, 2017) was an American professional football cornerback selected in the sixth round of the 2001 NFL draft by the New England Patriots of the National Football League (NFL).

Myers earned a Super Bowl ring with the Patriots in 2001.

He died of cancer on February 17, 2017, at age 38.
