= Hakim Akbar =

American gridiron football player (born 1980)

No. 28, 29, 47, 53
- Positions: Linebacker, safety

Personal information
- Born: August 11, 1980 (age 46); Riverside, California, U.S.
- Listed height: 6 ft 1 in (1.85 m)
- Listed weight: 225 lb (102 kg)

Career information
- High school: Riverside Polytechnic
- College: Washington
- NFL draft: 2001: 5th round, 163rd overall pick

Career history
- New England Patriots (2001); Houston Texans (2002)*; St. Louis Rams (2002); Tampa Bay Buccaneers (2003)*; Jacksonville Jaguars (2003-2004); Calgary Stampeders (2006)
- * Offseason or practice squad member only

Awards and highlights
- Super Bowl champion (XXXVI); First-team All-Pac-10 (2000); Second-team All-Pac-10 (1999); Rose Bowl champion (2001)

Career NFL statistics
- GP / GS: 10 / 0
- Tackles: 7
- Stats at Pro Football Reference

Akmal Hakim Akbar (born August 11, 1980) is an American former professional football player who was a linebacker of the National Football League (NFL) and Canadian Football League (CFL). He was selected by the New England Patriots in the fifth round of the 2001 NFL draft. He played college football for the Washington Huskies.

Akbar earned a Super Bowl ring with the Patriots in Super Bowl XXXVI. He was also a member of the St. Louis Rams, Houston Texans, Tampa Bay Buccaneers, Jacksonville Jaguars, and Calgary Stampeders.

== Early life ==
Akbar was born the son of Kenneth and Rasheeda Akbar on August 11, 1980, in Riverside, California. Akbar attended Riverside Polytechnic High School, where he was selected All-California Interscholastic Federation (CIF), all-county and all-league pick while registering 91 tackles, with six interceptions, three fumble recoveries and seven forced fumbles as a senior. He also received eight votes in Long Beach Press Telegram’s ‘Best in the West’ poll and was named to the Tacoma News Tribune’s ‘Western 100’ team. He was rated the eighth-best defensive back in the Western Region by Prep Star.

== College career ==
Akbar was a three-year letterman at the University of Washington. Akbar played in 33 games, including 26 consecutive starts at safety. He proved to be a versatile player, starting at both Strong and Free safety. In his college career, he recorded 225 tackles (123 solos) with eight tackles for losses. He also had four interceptions for a total of 52 yards. He also recorded five fumble recoveries and forced two fumbles. He played a major role in the 2000 Huskies 11–1 season and #3 overall ranking by Associated Press and ESPN/USA Today. While at Washington, he majored in Construction Management.

As a freshman in 1998, Akbar was a First-team All-American selection by The Sporting News, while adding honorable mention from Football News. He played in all 11 games at Free safety, starting the final four games of the season. He ranked third on the team with 59 tackles (36 solo).

As a sophomore in 1999, Akbar was a Second-team All-Pac-10 selection. He was named team Co-Outstanding Defensive Player of the Year by KOMO 1000 AM. He was switched to Strong safety before the start of season and started all 11 games. He finished fourth on the team with 69 tackles (33 solo), including three tackles-for-loss. He recorded one interception and deflected six others. He forced and recovered two fumbles. He also had one quarterback pressure.

As a junior in 2000, Akbar was a First-team All-American selection by the NFL Draft Report and CNNSI, as well as an honorable mention selection from College Football News. He was also a First-team All-Pac-10 selection. He led the team with 97 tackles (54 solo), including five for losses. He intercepted two passes for 31 yards and deflected six others. He also recovered two fumbles.

Akbar lined up at Strong safety for the first eight games before shifting to free safety when teammate and friend Curtis Williams suffered a career-ending spinal cord injury. After Williams' injury, Akbar considered quitting football. He recorded double-digit tackles in four games during the season and also set a career-high with 19 tackles against Oregon State. It was the highest single-game total since John Fiala recorded 22 tackles in 1996.

=== Career statistics ===
	Career Defensive Statistics														
Year	Team	G	Tack	Solo	Ast	TFL	Sack	FF	FR	Int	Yds	Lng	TD	Pass Def.	Block
1998	Washington Huskies	11	59	36	23	1	0	1	1	1	--	--	0	--	0
1999	Washington Huskies	11	69	33	47	3	0	2	2	1	4	4	0	6	0
2000	Washington Huskies	11	97	54	43	5	0	0	2	2	31	--	0	6	0
Total		33	225	123	102	9	0	3	5	4	35	--	0	12	0

== Professional career ==
Akbar chose to forgo his senior season and enter the 2001 NFL draft. Before the draft, Akbar was scouted and he ran a 4.5-second 40-yard dash. He was a second-day selection, taken in the fifth round (163rd overall) by the New England Patriots.

=== New England Patriots ===
After being drafted by the Patriots, Akbar signed two-year contract worth close $600,000 and included a signing bonus worth close to $75,000. He was released by the team in March 2002.

Akbar played on Special teams in six games for the Super Bowl champion Patriots. Akbar recorded five tackles for the season. He made his NFL debut in Miami. He played special teams and recorded two tackles against the San Diego Chargers. He recorded one tackle on special teams in Atlanta.

==== Car accident ====
In November 2001, Akbar suffered a spinal injury and nearly died. He was driving home, after socializing with teammates. He said he fell asleep at the wheel and woke up to find he was speeding down the interstate, going at least 80 mph. His Cadillac Escalade went off the road, and Akbar who wasn't wearing a seat belt, resulting in him being thrown through the sunroof. As a result of the accident, he suffered three fractured vertebrae, broken ribs and an injured hip and shoulder. Due to his injuries he spent a month in the hospital, eating through an IV. Police said alcohol wasn't involved, however he was charged with driving with the intent to endanger, among other offenses.

Due to the severity of his injuries, a doctor told Akbar he would not play football again. However, three months after the accident, he was once again working out, preparing to make his way back. Although he did not play in the Super Bowl, the Patriots presented him with a ring.

=== Houston Texans ===
On March 26, 2002, Akbar was claimed off waivers by the Houston Texans. However, on September 2, 2002, he was released.

=== St. Louis Rams ===
Akbar was signed by the St. Louis Rams on November 5, 2002. He played in four games for the Rams, playing on Special teams. He finished the season with two Special teams tackles. He made his Rams debut and recorded a special teams tackle at Philadelphia.

He was waived by the team on August 31, 2003.

=== Tampa Bay Buccaneers ===
On December 11, 2003, Akbar was signed to the practice squad of the Tampa Bay Buccaneers, but only spent five days there before being signed to the active roster of the Jacksonville Jaguars.

=== Jacksonville Jaguars ===
Akbar then spent the final two weeks of the season on the inactive list after being signed off the Tampa Bay practice squad on December 16, 2003, by the Jacksonville Jaguars.

In 2004, he was allocated to NFL Europe. He was released by the Jaguars on September 7, 2004. It was the last time he was a member of an NFL team.

=== Calgary Stampeders ===
On April 26, 2006, Akbar was signed to the practice squad of the Calgary Stampeders. He wasn't able to play very much during the Stampeders pre-season due to a hamstring injury. Due to being slowed by the hamstring injuries, he did not win the starting linebacker position. The Stampeders released him on October 14, 2006.

=== Career statistics ===
	Career Defensive Statistics														
Year	Team	G	Tack	Solo	Ast	TFL	Sack	FF	FR	Int	Yds	Lng	TD	Pass Def.	Block
2001	New England Patriots	6	5	2	3	0	0	0	0	0	0	0	0	0	0
2002	Houston Texans*	0	0	0	0	0	0	0	0	0	0	0	0	0	0
2002	St. Louis Rams	4	2	2	0	0	0	0	0	0	0	0	0	0	0
2003	Tampa Bay Buccaneers*	0	0	0	0	0	0	0	0	0	0	0	0	0	0
2004	Jacksonville Jaguars*	0	0	0	0	0	0	0	0	0	0	0	0	0	0
2006	Calgary Stampeders*	0	0	0	0	0	0	0	0	0	0	0	0	0	0
Total		10	7	4	3	0	0	0	0	0	0	0	0	0	0

*Offseason and/or practice squad member only
