= Ken Walter =

American football player (born 1972)

No. 13
- Position: Punter

Personal information
- Born: August 15, 1972 (age 54); Cleveland, Ohio, U.S.
- Listed height: 6 ft 1 in (1.85 m)
- Listed weight: 207 lb (94 kg)

Career information
- High school: Euclid (Euclid, Ohio)
- College: Kent State (1991–1994)
- NFL draft: 1995: undrafted

Career history
- Carolina Panthers (1997–2000); New England Patriots (2001–2003); Seattle Seahawks (2004); New England Patriots (2006)

Awards and highlights
- 2× Super Bowl champion (XXXVI, XXXVIII); PFWA All-Rookie Team (1997)
- Stats at Pro Football Reference

Kenneth Walter (born August 15, 1972) is an American former professional football player who was a punter in the National Football League (NFL). He played for the Carolina Panthers from 1997–2000, the New England Patriots from 2001–2003 and 2006, and the Seattle Seahawks in 2004. He played collegiately for Kent State University.

On the Patriots, Walter served as the holder for placekicker Adam Vinatieri. He successfully held for both of Vinatieri's Super Bowl winning kicks in Super Bowl XXXVI and Super Bowl XXXVIII. He also held for Vinatieri's famous kicks in the Tuck Rule Game against the Oakland Raiders.

At the end of the 2003 season, Walter wasn't re-signed by the Patriots. Walter struggled at the tail end of that season, was cut for a week as he lost his job to Brooks Barnard, then re-signed for the Patriots' final surge to their Super Bowl XXXVIII championship.

Walter's career appeared over, but he was signed by Seattle in November 2004 and punted in six regular season games and one playoff contest. Yet no team called in 2005 and Walter, who underwent surgery on his left shoulder in October, filed his retirement papers with the league.

As Walter rehabilitated his shoulder injury, he was motivated by his physical therapist to make a comeback. He told the Boston Globe that he had been striking the ball as well as he ever has, and both the Texans and Jaguars had him in for tryouts.

Walter was re-signed by the Patriots on November 22, 2006, after Josh Miller was placed on injured reserve. However, Walter himself suffered a season-ending injury December 17 against the Houston Texans, and was placed on injured reserve two days later.
