= 1999 All-Pacific-10 Conference football team =

The 1999 All-Pacific-10 Conference football team consists of American football players chosen for All-Pacific-10 Conference teams for the 1999 Pacific-10 Conference football season.

== Offensive selections ==
=== Quarterbacks ===
- Todd Husak, Stanford (Coaches-1)
- Marques Tuiasosopo, Washington (Coaches-2)

=== Running backs ===
- Trung Canidate, Arizona (Coaches-1)
- Reuben Droughns, Oregon (Coaches-1)
- Ken Simonton, Oregon St. (Coaches-2)
- J. R. Redmond, Arizona St. (Coaches-2)

=== Wide receivers ===
- Dennis Northcutt, Arizona (Coaches-1)
- Troy Walters, Stanford (Coaches-1)
- Danny Farmer, UCLA (Coaches-2)
- DeRonnie Pitts, Stanford (Coaches-2)

=== Tight ends ===
- Todd Heap, Arizona St. (Coaches-1)
- Brandon Manumaleuna, Arizona (Coaches-2)

=== Offensive linemen ===
- Mike McLaughlin, Stanford (Coaches-1)
- Travis Claridge, USC (Coaches-1)
- Jeff Cronshagen, Stanford (Coaches-1)
- Marvel Smith, Arizona St. (Coaches-1)
- Aaron Koch, Oregon St. (Coaches-1)
- Chad Ward, Washington (Coaches-2)
- Kurth Connell, Washington (Coaches-2)
- Bruce Wiggins, Arizona (Coaches-2)
- Josh Beckett, Oregon (Coaches-2)
- Steven Grace, Arizona (Coaches-2)
- Jason White, Oregon St. (Coaches-2)

== Defensive selections ==
=== Defensive ends ===
- Andre Carter, California (Coaches-1)
- Erik Flowers, Arizona St. (Coaches-1)
- Larry Tripplett, Washington (Coaches-2)
- Joe Tafoya, Arizona (Coaches-2)

=== Defensive tackles ===
- Willie Howard, Stanford (Coaches-1)
- Jacob Waasdorp, California (Coaches-1)
- Ennis Davis, USC (Coaches-2)
- Kenyon Coleman, UCLA (Coaches-2)

=== Linebackers ===
- Sekou Sanyika, California (Coaches-1)
- Peter Sirmon, Oregon (Coaches-1)
- Adam Archuleta, Arizona St. (Coaches-1)
- Steve Gleason, Washington St. (Coaches-2)
- Marcus Bell, Arizona (Coaches-2)
- Riall Johnson, Stanford (Coaches-2)

=== Defensive backs ===
- Deltha O'Neal, California (Coaches-1)
- Michael Fletcher, Oregon (Coaches-1)
- David Gibson, USC (Coaches-1)
- Courtney Jackson, Arizona St. (Coaches-1)
- Dennis Weathersby, Oregon St. (Coaches-2)
- Hakim Akbar, Washington (Coaches-2)
- Jermaine Smith, Washington (Coaches-2)
- Justin Wilcox, Oregon (Coaches-2)

== Special teams ==
=== Placekickers ===
- Mike Biselli, Stanford (Coaches-1)
- Rian Lindell, Washington St. (Coaches-2)

=== Punters ===
- Nick Harris, California (Coaches-1)
- Kurtis Doerr, Oregon (Coaches-2)

=== Return specialists/All purpose ===
- Deltha O'Neal, California (Coaches-1)
- Emory Brock, Stanford (Coaches-1)
- J. R. Redmond, Arizona St. (Coaches-1)
- Michael Fletcher, Oregon (Coaches-2)
- Dietrich Moore, Oregon (Coaches-2)

== Key ==
Coaches = selected by the conference coaches

== See also ==
- 1999 College Football All-America Team
