= Drew Inzer =

American football player (born 1979)

No. 60
- Position: Guard

Personal information
- Born: December 5, 1979 (age 46); Woonsocket, Rhode Island, U.S.
- Listed height: 6 ft 4.5 in (1.94 m)
- Listed weight: 305 lb (138 kg)

Career information
- High school: North Smithfield (RI)
- College: Brown
- NFL draft: 2001: undrafted

Career history
- New England Patriots (2001–2002)*; Jacksonville Jaguars (2002)
- * Offseason or practice squad member only

Awards and highlights
- All-Ivy League (2000)

Andrew A. Inzer (born December 5, 1979) is an American former professional football offensive lineman. He attended Brown University and was a practice squad member of the Super Bowl XXXVI winning New England Patriots. He was also on the active roster of the Jacksonville Jaguars.

Inzer played football at North Smithfield High School in Rhode Island and then was a two-year letterman at Brown University (1999–2000), where he had transferred to from Boston University, which had dropped its football program. At Brown, Inzer won an Ivy Football Championship in 1999, served as Tri-Captain in 2000, earned Ivy League all-league honors, and was awarded the university wide Zucconi Award for sportsmanship in 2001. He joined the Patriots as an undrafted rookie free agent in 2001, where he received a Super Bowl ring, and then he was on the roster for the Jacksonville Jaguars in 2002 and through August 2003.

Inzer currently serves as a Humanities teacher at the St. Paul's School in Concord, NH. Additionally coaching football in the fall and wrestling in the winter. He formerly served as an Economics teacher as well as an offensive line coach at Lawrenceville School. He also formerly served as Housemaster in Lawrenceville in the Hamill House. Along with this, he served as a dorm head for Hayden Hall and Shea Family Cottage at Northfield Mount Hermon School, along with his time teaching/coaching/dorm directing at Bridgton Academy, an all-boys postgraduate school in Maine. In his spare time he enjoys playing the bassoon, fly-fishing, hiking, and raising his children with his high school sweetheart.
