= Otis Smith (American football) =

American football player and coach (born 1965)

No. 23, 30, 45
- Position: Cornerback

Personal information
- Born: October 22, 1965 (age 61); New Orleans, Louisiana, U.S.
- Listed height: 5 ft 11 in (1.80 m)
- Listed weight: 198 lb (90 kg)

Career information
- High school: East Jefferson (Metairie, Louisiana)
- College: Missouri
- NFL draft: 1990: undrafted

Career history

Playing
- Philadelphia Eagles (1990–1994); New York Jets (1995–1996); New England Patriots (1996); New York Jets (1997–1999); New England Patriots (2000–2002); Detroit Lions (2003)

Coaching
- Philadelphia Eagles (2008) Assistant secondary coach; Kansas City Chiefs (2010) Defensive quality control coach; Los Angeles Wildcats (2020) Defensive backs coach; Zürich Helvetic Guards (2023) Defensive coordinator

Awards and highlights
- Super Bowl champion (XXXVI)

Career NFL statistics
- Tackles: 518
- Sacks: 5.5
- Interceptions: 29
- Touchdowns: 7
- Stats at Pro Football Reference

Otis Smith III (born October 22, 1965) is an American football coach and former player professionally as a cornerback in the National Football League (NFL).

== Early life ==
Smith attended East Jefferson High School in the late 1980s.

== Professional career ==
=== Philadelphia Eagles ===
==== 1990 season ====
On April 25, 1990, the Philadelphia Eagles signed Smith as an undrafted free agent to a two—year, $120,000 rookie contract that included a signing bonus of $10,000. On August 28, 1990, the Eagles officially placed Smith on their physically unable to perform list due to appendicitis that subsequently led to an appendectomy in July. He spent the entire 1990 NFL season on the P.U.P. list.

==== 1991 season ====
Head coach Rich Kotite named Smith a backup cornerback to begin the regular season, behind starting tandem Eric Allen and Ben Smith. On September 1, 1991, Smith made his professional regular season debut in the Philadelphia Eagles' season-opener at the Green Bay Packers and recorded five combined tackles (four solo) as they won 20—3. On December 8, 1991, Smith made one solo tackle, one pass deflection, and had his first career interception off a pass attempt Phil Simms threw to wide receiver Ed McCaffrey during a 19—14 victory at the New York Giants. On December 22, 1991, Smith earned his first career start as a nickelback and made one solo tackle, one pass deflection, and intercepted Mark Rypien's pass to wide receiver Ricky Sanders and returned it 74—yards to score the first touchdown of his career during a 22—24 victory against the Washington Redskins. He finished the 1991 NFL season with ten combined tackles (seven solo), two pass deflections, two interceptions, a forced fumble, a fumble recovery, and one touchdown in 15 games and one start.

==== 1992 season ====
Throughout training camp, Smith competed against Izel Jenkins for the role at starting cornerback as Ben Smith remained inactive after suffering a torn ACL the previous season. Head coach Rich Kotite named Eric Allen and Izel Jenkins the starting cornerbacks to begin the regular season with Smith as the starting nickelback. On September 20, 1992, Smith made one solo tackle, a pass deflection, and had his lone interception of the season on a pass attempt by John Elway as the Eagles shutout the Denver Broncos 0—30. He finished the season with 24 combined tackles (16 solo), two pass deflections, and one interception in 16 games and one start.

==== 1993 season ====
Throughout training camp, Smith competed to be the left outside cornerback against Ben Smith, Mark McMillan, and Derrick Frazier. Defensive coordinator Bud Carson named Smith a backup and listed him as the fourth cornerback on the depth chart to begin the season, behind Eric Allen, Mark McMillan, and Ben Smith. In Week 3, he set a season-high with four solo tackles as the Eagles defeated the Washington Redskins 34—31. On November 28, 1993, Smith recorded two solo tackles, set a season-high with two pass deflections, and intercepted a pass running back Brian Mitchell attempted to throw to safety Todd Bowles on a fake punt during a 17—14 win at the Washington Redskins. He finished the 1993 NFL season with five combined tackles (three solo), two pass deflections, and one interception in 15 games and zero starts.

==== 1994 season ====
On April 26, 1994, the Philadelphia Eagles re-signed Smith to a two—year contract. Head coach Rich Kotite named Smith as a backup cornerback to begin the regular season, behind starting tandem Eric Allen and Mark McMillan. On November 27, 1994, Smith set a season-high with six solo tackles and sacked Jeff George for a two—yard loss marking the first sack of his career as the Eagles lost 21—28 at the Atlanta Falcons. He finished the 1994 NFL season with 21 combined tackles (16 solo), two pass deflections, and one sack in 16 games and two starts. He set a career-high with 20 tackles on special teams. On December 26, 1994, the Philadelphia Eagles fired head coach Rich Kotite after they finished the season with a 7—9 record.

=== New York Jets ===
==== 1995 season ====
On April 13, 1995, the New York Jets signed Smith to a two—year, $950,000 contract that included an initial signing bonus of $150,000. He was reunited with head coach Rich Kotite. Entering training camp, Smith was slated to be a starting cornerback following the departures of James Hasty and Eric Thomas. Head coach Rich Kotite named Smith and Aaron Glenn the starting cornerbacks to begin the season.

On September 3, 1995, Smith started in the Jets' season-opener at the Miami Dolphins and made four combined tackles (three solo), a pass deflection, and had his first interception as a member of the Jets, picking off Dan Marino's pass attempt to Irving Fryar as they lost 14—52. On September 10, 1995, Smith made six combined tackles (four solo), one pass deflection, and intercepted Craig Erickson's pass attempt to Marshall Faulk and returned it for a 49—yard touchdown during a 27—24 overtime loss to the Indianapolis Colts. In Week 4, he set a season-high with six combined tackles (five solo), set a season-high with three pass deflections, and intercepted a pass attempt by Jeff George during a 3—13 loss at the Atlanta Falcons. This marked his fourth consecutive game with an interception. He was inactive for five consecutive games (Weeks 5—9) after injuring his foot. On December 3, 1995, Smith recorded three solo tackles, made two pass deflections, and set a career-high with two interceptions on passes by Mark Rypien during a 23—20 loss to the St. Louis Rams. He finished the 1995 NFL season with 47 combined tackles (28 solo), 14 pass deflections, and one touchdown in 11 games and 10 starts. He set a career-high with six interceptions during the season.

==== 1996 season ====
Smith competed against rookie third round pick (62nd overall)Ray Mickens and fifth round pick (133rd overall) Marcus Coleman for his starting role at cornerback. Head coach Rich Kotite named Smith a backup and listed him as the fourth cornerback on the depth chart to begin the season, behind Aaron Glenn, Ray Mickens, and Marcus Coleman.

On September 23, 1996, the New York Jets waived Smith.

=== New England Patriots ===
On October 9, 1996, the New England Patriots claimed Smith off waivers. Head coach Bill Parcells named Smith a backup and listed him as the fourth cornerback on the depth chart upon his arrival, behind Ty Law, Jimmy Hitchcock, and Michael McGruder. Entering Week 12, Smith was promoted to starting nickekback after Ty Law suffered a knee injury that sidelined him for three games. The following week, Smith was named a starting cornerback after supplanting Jimmy Hitchcock for the role and was paired with Ricky Reynolds. In Week 14, he reckon three solo tackles, set a season-high with two pass deflections, and had his first interception as a member of the Patriots after picking off a pass thrown by Stan Humphries during a 45—7 win at the San Diego Chargers.

He started in 1996, starting nine games, including the playoffs and Super Bowl XXXI loss to the Green Bay Packers. During his first stint with the Patriots, Smith was perhaps best remembered by Patriots fans for recovering a fumble in the 1996 AFC Title Game against the Jaguars. Smith returned it 47 yards for a touchdown, which made the score 20–6 and effectively put the game away, pushing the Patriots to their second ever Super Bowl appearance.

=== New York Jets (second stint) ===
On May 21, 1997, the New York Jets signed Smith to a one—year, $400,000 contract.

On April 9, 1998, the New York Jets signed Smith to a three—year, $3.50 million contract that included an initial signing bonus of $500,000. On August 21, 2000, the New York Jets released Smith due to salary cap concerns.

=== New England Patriots (second stint) ===
On August 23, 2000, the New England Patriots signed Smith to a one—year, $440,000 contract for the veteran league minimum.

Smith was a contributor to the Patriots winning the Super Bowl XXXVI in 2002, when his interception set up a key field goal against the St. Louis Rams.

On October 4, 2002, the New England Patriots re-signed Smith to a three—year, $2.51 million contract extension that included a signing bonus of $750,000.

On December 20, 2002, the Patriots officially placed Smith on injured reserve due to a shoulder injury.

Entering training camp, Smith was expected to compete against Tyrone Poole for a starting role at cornerback. The Patriots had selected cornerbacks Eugene Wilson in the second round (36th overall) and Asante Samuel in the fourth round (120th overall) of the 2003 NFL draft. On August 18, 2003, the New England Patriots officially waived Smith as part of their roster cuts.

=== Detroit Lions ===
On September 4, 2003, the Detroit Lions signed Smith.

=== New England Patriots (third stint) ===
On April 13, 2004, the New England Patriots signed Smith to a one—year, $760,000 contract at the veteran league minimum. On July 7, 2004, the Patriots officially released Smith. On May 18, 2005, Smith retired as a member of the New England Patriots.

== Coaching career ==
Smith agreed to join Andy Reid's staff in Philadelphia in January 2008 as an assistant secondary coach for the Eagles. It is similar to a position he held in New England as a member of the Patriots organization as part of the NFL's minority coaching fellowship program.

On June 17, 2009, an Eagles spokesperson confirmed that Smith would not be returning as an Eagles assistant for the 2009 season.

On February 1, 2010, the Kansas City Chiefs announced that Smith would join their staff as defensive quality control coach.

On June 12, 2019, Smith was named DB coach for the Los Angeles Wildcats.

On September 2, 2022, Smith became the defensive coordinator for ELF team Zürich Helvetic Guards.
