= Greg Randall =

American gridiron football player (born 1978)

No. 77, 74, 68, 64, 76
- Position: Offensive tackle

Personal information
- Born: June 23, 1978 (age 48); Galveston, Texas, U.S.
- Listed height: 6 ft 6 in (1.98 m)
- Listed weight: 335 lb (152 kg)

Career information
- High school: La Marque (TX)
- College: Michigan State
- NFL draft: 2000: 4th round, 127th overall pick

Career history
- New England Patriots (2000–2002); Houston Texans (2003); San Francisco 49ers (2004)*; St. Louis Rams (2004)*; Cleveland Browns (2005)*; Hamilton Tiger-Cats (2006); New York Dragons (2007–2008)
- * Offseason or practice squad member only

Awards and highlights
- Super Bowl champion (XXXVI)

Career NFL statistics
- Games played: 51
- Games started: 39
- Stats at Pro Football Reference

Career AFL statistics
- Tackles: 2
- Stats at ArenaFan.com

Greg Wayne Randall (born Robinson; June 23, 1978) is an American former professional football player who was an offensive tackle in the National Football League (NFL). He was selected by the New England Patriots in the fourth round of the 2000 NFL draft. He played college football at Michigan State.

In his career, Randall played for the New England Patriots, Houston Texans, San Francisco 49ers, St. Louis Rams, and Cleveland Browns of the NFL, as well as the Hamilton Tiger-Cats of the Canadian Football League (CFL), and the New York Dragons of the Arena Football League (AFL).

Randall was known as Greg Robinson before extending his last name to Robinson-Randall to honor his father, who died of cancer when Randall was five years old. He changed his name to Randall in 2002.

== Early life ==
When Randal was five years old, his father died after battling cancer. Coming out of high school, Randall was rated in the top 100 prospects in the state of Texas.

== College career ==
Randall attended Coffeyville Community College for two years before transferring to Michigan State. In 1997, he was voted Super Prep JUCO All-American selection. He also earned All-Conference honors as an offensive tackle twice while at Coffeyville.

In 1998, Randall transferred to Michigan State where he was a starter from the beginning. As a junior, he earned the team's Outstanding Underclass Lineman Award. He played in every game, starting the final 10 at right tackle. He recorded 48 knockdowns blocks and was graded at 82.8% for blocking consistency. He recorded eight knockdown blocks, including one that opened a hole on a three-yard touchdown run by Sedrick Irvin who rushed for 119 yards against Notre Dame.

In 1999 as a senior, Randall was an All-Big Ten First-team selection. He started at the right tackle position, helping the offense average 368.2 yards per game as he recorded 87 knockdown blocks. He recorded 13 knockdowns, including two touchdown resulting blocks on a 23-yard pass and another that cleared the way for T. J. Duckett’s four-yard run into the end zone, as the team recorded 492 yards against Eastern Michigan University. On the season the team ended with a 10-2 record, the schools’ highest win total since 1965. They also ended their season with a 37-34 victory over Florida in the 1999 Citrus Bowl. Also, while at Michigan State, he majored in Kinesiology.

== Professional career ==
=== National Football League (2000–2003) ===
Randall was selected in the fourth round (127th overall) in the 2000 NFL draft by the New England Patriots. He made his NFL debut in New England's season opening loss to the Tampa Bay Buccaneers. As a rookie, he played in 12 games, including four starts at right tackle. In 2001, he helped the Patriots move from 26th to 12th in the league in rushing, helping running back Antowain Smith rush for a career-high 1,157 yards. He was one of only three offensive linemen, along with Joe Andruzzi, and Mike Compton to start all 19 games, regular season through playoffs, having started all 16 regular season games and three playoff games at right tackle. In his last season with the Patriots, Randall played in seven games, including three starts at right tackle. However, he was inactive for the rest of the games that season.

On March 6, 2003, he was traded by the Patriots to the Houston Texans in exchange for a fifth-round pick in the 2003 NFL draft. In his only season in Houston, he started all 16 regular season games at right tackle. He helped Domanick Davis lead all rookies with 1,031 rushing yards.

After being released by the Texans, Randall was pursued by the Dallas Cowboys and Miami Dolphins before signing with the San Francisco 49ers on April 20, 2004 and attended their training-camp until he was released on June 16. On August 2, 2004 after being released by the 49ers, Randall signed with the St. Louis Rams. He attended the training camp and played in all four pre-season games, however he was released on September 13. He was signed by the Cleveland Browns on February 15, 2005. He then attended the Browns' training camp and played in all four pre-season games. However, he was one of Cleveland's final cuts when he was released on September 3.

==== NFL career summary ====
Randall played in 51 career games, with 38 starts, over four seasons, three with the Patriots. He never missed a game due to injury. Randall earned a Super Bowl ring in 2002 in the Patriots 20-17 win over the St. Louis Rams.

=== Canadian Football League (2006) ===
Robinson signed with the Hamilton Tiger-Cats of the Canadian Football League on March 23, 2006. He made his CFL debut in the Tiger-Cats' season opening road loss to the Toronto Argonauts. He started the first nine games of the regular season at left tackle. He was released on August 14, 2006.

=== Arena Football League (2007–2008) ===
Randall, signed with the New York Dragons of the Arena Football League and as a rookie in 2007 he played in all 16 games and recorded 1.5 tackles on defense. In 2008, he played in just one game, against the Kansas City Brigade and recorded one tackle on defense.

== See also ==
- List of Arena Football League and National Football League players
