= Arther Love =

American football player (born 1977)

Arthur Love
No. 48
- Position: Tight end

Personal information
- Born: September 18, 1977 (age 49); Soperton, Georgia, U.S.
- Listed height: 6 ft 4 in (1.93 m)
- Listed weight: 250 lb (113 kg)

Career information
- High school: Treutlen County (Soperton)
- College: South Carolina State
- NFL draft: 2001: 6th round, 180th overall pick

Career history
- New England Patriots (2001–2002); Denver Broncos (2003)*
- * Offseason or practice squad member only

Awards and highlights
- Super Bowl champion (XXXVI)

Arther Lee Love (born September 18, 1977) is an American former professional football tight end for the New England Patriots of the National Football League (NFL). He was selected 180th overall by the Patriots in the sixth round of the 2001 NFL draft. He later won Super Bowl XXXVI with New England.
