= Tebucky Jones =

American football player (born 1974)

No. 34, 24
- Position: Safety

Personal information
- Born: October 6, 1974 (age 52); New Britain, Connecticut, U.S.
- Listed height: 6 ft 2 in (1.88 m)
- Listed weight: 220 lb (100 kg)

Career information
- High school: New Britain (CT)
- College: Syracuse
- NFL draft: 1998: 1st round, 22nd overall pick

Career history
- New England Patriots (1998–2002); New Orleans Saints (2003–2004); Miami Dolphins (2005); New England Patriots (2006)

Awards and highlights
- Super Bowl champion (XXXVI)

Career NFL statistics
- Tackles: 435
- Interceptions: 6
- Forced fumbles: 5
- Stats at Pro Football Reference

Tebucky Shermain Jones (born October 6, 1974) is an American former professional football player who was a safety for nine seasons in the National Football League (NFL). His professional career began when he was selected out of Syracuse University in the first round of the 1998 NFL draft by the New England Patriots. He won Super Bowl XXXVI with the team. He also played for the Miami Dolphins and the New Orleans Saints.

== Professional career ==
Pre-draft measurables
Height	Weight	Arm length	Hand span	40-yard dash	10-yard split	20-yard split	20-yard shuttle	Three-cone drill	Vertical jump
6 ft 1 1/4 in (1.86 m)	214 lb (97 kg)	34 1/2 in (0.88 m)	10 in (0.25 m)	4.43 s	1.54 s	2.61 s	3.94 s	7.34 s	38.5 in (0.98 m)

=== New England Patriots ===
Jones was selected in the first round with the 22nd overall pick by the New England Patriots in the 1998 NFL draft and signed a five-year deal.

Jones is best known for his role on the 2001 Patriots team that won Super Bowl XXXVI. In the Super Bowl, in the fourth quarter with the St. Louis Rams in a do-or-die situation down 3–17 against the Patriots, Rams quarterback Kurt Warner fumbled on 4th-and-3 next to the goal line, and Tebucky Jones picked up the fumble and raced down the length of the field for what would have been a 97-yard touchdown, but the return was negated by a holding penalty on Patriots linebacker Willie McGinest.

Jones played a total of 72 games for the Patriots, starting 36 while recording 224 total tackles, and 4 interceptions.

=== New Orleans Saints ===
On April 14, 2003, Jones was traded to the New Orleans Saints in exchange for a third-round pick, and a seventh-round pick in the 2003 NFL draft, and a fourth-round pick in the 2004 NFL draft. Jones played and started a total of 31 games for the Saints and recorded 172 total tackles, and 2 interceptions. Jones was released on March 15, 2005.

=== Miami Dolphins ===
On March 16, 2005, Jones signed a two-year contract with the Miami Dolphins. He was placed on Injured Reserve on October 25. Jones played and started six games, and recorded 39 total tackles. He was released on March 2, 2006.

=== New England Patriots (second stint) ===
On April 6, 2006, Jones signed with the New England Patriots. He was placed on injured reserve on September 2, with a leg injury. Jones was released by the Patriots on February 22, 2007.

Jones had a tryout with the Oakland Raiders on October 24, 2007, but his knee was so severely injured that the Raiders would not take him.

== NFL career statistics ==
Legend
	Won the Super Bowl
	Led the league
**Bold**	Career high

=== Regular season ===
Year	Team	Games		Tackles				Interceptions				Fumbles			
Year	Team	GP	GS	Comb	Solo	Ast	Sck	Int	Yds	TD	Lng	FF	FR	Yds	TD
1998	NWE	16	0	13	10	3	0.0	0	0	0	0	0	1	0	0
1999	NWE	11	2	17	17	0	0.0	0	0	0	0	0	0	0	0
2000	NWE	15	9	67	51	16	0.0	**2**	20	0	20	0	0	0	0
2001	NWE	16	12	72	53	19	1.0	1	-4	0	-4	**3**	0	0	0
2002	NWE	14	13	55	41	14	1.5	1	0	0	0	0	**2**	**24**	**1**
2003	NOR	15	15	70	52	18	0.0	1	2	0	2	1	0	0	0
2004	NOR	16	16	**102**	**79**	**23**	0.0	1	**55**	0	**55**	1	1	0	0
2005	MIA	6	6	39	24	15	**2.0**	0	0	0	0	0	0	0	0
		109	73	435	327	108	4.5	6	73	0	55	5	4	24	1

=== Playoffs ===
Year	Team	Games		Tackles				Interceptions				Fumbles			
Year	Team	GP	GS	Comb	Solo	Ast	Sck	Int	Yds	TD	Lng	FF	FR	Yds	TD
1998	NWE	1	0	0	0	0	0.0	0	0	0	0	0	0	0	0
2001	NWE	3	3	**14**	**10**	**4**	0.0	**1**	**19**	0	**19**	0	0	0	0
		4	3	14	10	4	0.0	1	19	0	19	0	0	0	0

== Personal life ==
Jones was the head coach of the New Britain Golden Hurricanes in New Britain, Connecticut until 2020.

On August 1, 2008, Jones was arrested at the Mohegan Sun casino in Uncasville, Connecticut. The incident involved Jones' friend being accused of making “inappropriate contact” with a woman in the lobby, and a fight broke out between Jones and the woman's boyfriend. The fight resulted in a broken jaw. The lawsuit was settled for $20,000

His son, Tebucky Jones Jr., played college football at the University of Connecticut and Fordham University and was briefly a member the Tennessee Titans before being cut during the preseason.
