= Kenyatta Jones =

American football player (1979–2018)

No. 74
- Position: Offensive tackle

Personal information
- Born: January 18, 1979; Gainesville, Florida, U.S.
- Died: June 9, 2018 (aged 39); Colorado, U.S.
- Listed height: 6 ft 3 in (1.91 m)
- Listed weight: 307 lb (139 kg)

Career information
- High school: Eastside (Gainesville)
- College: South Florida
- NFL draft: 2001: 4th round, 96th overall pick

Career history
- New England Patriots (2001–2003); Washington Redskins (2003–2004); Tampa Bay Storm (2008); New York Sentinels (2009)*
- * Offseason or practice squad member only

Awards and highlights
- Super Bowl champion (XXXVI)

Career NFL statistics
- Games played: 21
- Games started: 13
- Stats at Pro Football Reference

Kenyatta Lapoleon Jones (January 18, 1979 – June 9, 2018) was an American professional football player who was an offensive tackle in the National Football League (NFL). He was selected by the New England Patriots in the fourth round of the 2001 NFL draft. He played college football for the South Florida Bulls.

Jones was also a member of the Washington Redskins and Tampa Bay Storm.

After starting 11 games for the Patriots in 2002, Jones was placed on the Physically Unable to Perform list at the beginning of the 2003 season. While on the list, Jones was arrested on October 21, 2003 and charged with allegedly throwing hot tea on his cousin, Mark Paul. He was released by the Patriots five days later. While playing for the Tampa Bay Storm of the Arena Football League (AFL) in March 2008, Jones was arrested outside a Tampa, Florida nightclub after attempting to urinate on the dance floor and then shoving the off-duty police officer who threw Jones out of the establishment. Jones was arrested for battery on a law enforcement officer and resisting arrest.

Jones died in Colorado on June 9, 2018, aged 39. His mother said he died from cardiac arrest.
