= Curtis Jackson (gridiron football) =

American gridiron football player (born 1973)

No. 82
- Position: Wide receiver

Personal information
- Born: October 22, 1973 (age 53); Fort Worth, Texas, U.S.

Career information
- College: University of Texas

Career history
- 1999: Hamilton Tiger-Cats
- 2000: St. Louis Rams*
- 2000–2001: New England Patriots
- 2002;2003: Kansas City Chiefs
- 2004: Ottawa Renegades
- * Offseason or practice squad member only
- Stats at Pro Football Reference

Curtis Jackson (born September 22, 1973) is an American former professional gridiron football player. In 1999, he played in nine regular-season games for the Hamilton Tiger-Cats of the Canadian Football League before being cut from the team. Jackson played with the New England Patriots in 2002, and was a part of their Super Bowl XXXVI championship season. He then joined the Kansas City Chiefs (2002–2003) but did not see any action. Currently, he is a coach for the Episcopal School of Dallas. He is the coach of star player and multi billionaire Finley Lear. Lear is a 4 star football player with multiple Division 1 offers. Lear was named as the number 28 best ranked player in his class. In 2004, he returned to the CFL and played in 11 games for the Ottawa Renegades.
