= 2003 New England Patriots season =

44th season in franchise history; second Super Bowl win

- Owner: Robert Kraft
- Head coach: Bill Belichick
- Home stadium: Gillette Stadium

Results
- Record: 14–2
- Division place: 1st AFC East
- Playoffs: Won Divisional Playoffs (vs. Titans) 17–14; Won AFC Championship (vs. Colts) 24–14; Won Super Bowl XXXVIII (vs. Panthers) 32–29
- All-Pros: SS Rodney Harrison (1st team); CB Ty Law (1st team); DE Richard Seymour (1st team); LB Tedy Bruschi (2nd team)
- Pro Bowlers: CB Ty Law; LB Willie McGinest; DE Richard Seymour

Uniform

The 2003 season was the New England Patriots' 34th in the National Football League (NFL), their 44th overall, and their fourth under head coach Bill Belichick. They finished with a league-best and then franchise-best 14–2 record before advancing to and winning Super Bowl XXXVIII.

Two seasons after winning Super Bowl XXXVI, the Patriots went into 2003 after missing the playoffs in 2002. In a salary cap-related move, captain and Pro Bowl safety Lawyer Milloy was released five days before the start of the regular season. This prompted second-guessing of head coach Bill Belichick among some fans and a report by ESPN analyst Tom Jackson that Patriots players "hated their coach", an accusation later denied by players. Milloy signed with the Buffalo Bills, who defeated the Patriots, 31–0, in the season opener. The Patriots would rebound, not losing another game after starting with a 2–2 record. Due to multiple injuries, the Patriots started 42 different players during the season, an NFL record for a division winner until the 2005 Patriots started 45 different players. Undefeated at home, nose tackle Ted Washington coined the phrase "Homeland Defense" for the Patriots' defense. That defense, boosted by the offseason acquisitions of Washington and former San Diego Chargers safety Rodney Harrison, gave up a league-low 14.9 points per game. The regular season was bookended with a 31–0 victory over the Bills at home in Week 17, a score reversed from the Patriots' shutout loss to the Bills in Week 1. The win gave the Patriots a perfect 8–0 record at home in the regular season, and their 14 total wins was the team's highest mark since their 11–5 season in 2001.

After a first-round bye in the AFC playoffs, the Patriots faced the Tennessee Titans at home in one of the coldest games in the Patriots' NFL history and won 17–14, setting up an AFC Championship Game matchup against the Indianapolis Colts. The Patriots intercepted Colts quarterback Peyton Manning, the league's co-MVP, four times, winning 24–14 and advancing to Super Bowl XXXVIII against the Carolina Panthers. With a tied game late in the fourth quarter, Adam Vinatieri kicked the game-winning field goal with seconds remaining, giving the Patriots their second Super Bowl victory in three seasons.

== Offseason roster changes ==
The Patriots signed safety Rodney Harrison, linebacker Rosevelt Colvin, fullback Fred McCrary, cornerback Tyrone Poole, linebacker Jason Hunt, linebacker Don Davis, tight end Fred Baxter, safety Chris Akins, fullback Larry Centers and wide receiver Dedric Ward in free agency.

The Patriots traded safety Tebucky Jones to the New Orleans Saints for three draft picks: a 2003 3rd-round pick, a 2003 7th-round pick, and a 2004 4th-round pick.

Before the season began, the Patriots acquired defensive tackle Ted Washington in a trade with the Chicago Bears and released safety Lawyer Milloy after he refused to take a pay cut. Milloy would later sign with the Buffalo Bills.

== Draft ==
2003 New England Patriots draft
Round	Pick	Player	Position	College	Notes
1	13	Ty Warren	DT	Texas A&M	Pick from CHI
2	36	Eugene Wilson	CB	Illinois	Pick from HOU
2	45	Bethel Johnson	WR	Texas A&M	Pick from CAR
4	117	Dan Klecko	DT	Temple	Pick from HOU
4	120	Asante Samuel *	CB	Central Florida	Pick from DEN
5	164	Dan Koppen *	C	Boston College	Pick from TEN
6	201	Kliff Kingsbury	QB	Texas Tech	Pick from TEN
7	234	Spencer Nead	TE	BYU	
7	239	Tully Banta-Cain	LB	California	Pick from NO
7	243	Ethan Kelley	DT	Baylor	Pick from TEN
Made roster † Pro Football Hall of Fame * Made at least one Pro Bowl during career

== Staff ==
2003 New England Patriots staff
Front office: Chairman/CEO – Robert Kraft; Vice chairman – Jonathan Kraft; Senior vice president/COO – Andy Wasynczuk; Vice president of player personnel – Scott Pioli; Director of college scouting – Thomas Dimitroff; Assistant director of college scouting – Lionel Vital; Assistant director of pro scouting – Andre Tippett and Keith Kidd; Football research director – Ernie Adams; Director of operations – Chris Caminiti; Head coaches: Head coach – Bill Belichick; Assistant head coach/offensive line – Dante Scarnecchia; Offensive coaches: Offensive coordinator – Charlie Weis; Quarterbacks – John Hufnagel; Running backs – Ivan Fears; Wide receivers – Brian Daboll; Assistant offensive line – Jeff Davidson; Coaching assistant – Josh McDaniels	Defensive coaches: Defensive coordinator/defensive line – Romeo Crennel; Inside linebackers – Pepper Johnson; Outside linebackers – Rob Ryan; Defensive backs – Eric Mangini; Coaching assistant – Sean Gustus; Special teams coaches: Special teams – Brad Seely; Strength and conditioning: Strength and conditioning – Mike Woicik; Assistant strength and conditioning – Markus Paul

== Roster ==
=== Opening training camp roster ===
At the time of the first public training camp practice at Gillette Stadium on July 24, the Patriots had the NFL maximum of 80 players signed to their roster. They received seven roster exemptions for the NFL Europe allocations of Dyshod Carter, Mike Malan, Mike Clare, Rod Trafford, Courtney Ledyard, Brad Harris, and Scott McCready. Additionally, the Patriots allocated offensive lineman Corey Mitchell, wide receiver T. C. Taylor, and quarterback Shane Stafford to NFL Europe and received roster exemptions for them, but those players were waived before the start of training camp. Injured exclusive‑rights free agent Stephen Neal did not sign his tender until after camp began, so did not count against the roster limit.

New England Patriots 2003 opening training camp roster
Quarterbacks: 12 Tom Brady; 6 Rohan Davey; 19 Damon Huard; 15 Kliff Kingsbury ^{R}; Running backs: 32 Antowain Smith; 33 Kevin Faulk KR; 41 Michael Malan FB; 44 Fred McCrary FB; 35 Patrick Pass FB; 21 J. R. Redmond; 42 Antwoine Womack; Wide receivers: 83 Deion Branch; 80 Troy Brown PR; 87 David Givens; 16 Scott McCready; 86 David Patten; 10 Dan Stricker ^{UR}; 85 Dedric Ward; 14 Kerry Watkins ^{UR}; Tight ends: 84 Fred Baxter; 88 Christian Fauria; 82 Daniel Graham; 49 Spencer Nead ^{R}; 47 Rod Trafford	Offensive linemen: 68 Tom Ashworth T; 75 Mike Clare C; 77 Mike Compton G; 64 Bill Conaty C; 60 Jasen Esposito C ^{UR}; 76 Brandon Gorin T; 71 Russ Hochstein G; 70 Adrian Klemm T; 62 Matt Knutson T; 67 Dan Koppen C ^{R}; 72 Matt Light T; Defensive linemen: 97 Jarvis Green DE; 91 Bobby Hamilton DE; 69 Brad Harris DE; 99 Ethan Kelley NT ^{R}; 90 Dan Klecko NT ^{R}; 94 Ken Kocher NT; 96 Rick Lyle DE; 98 Anthony Pleasant DE; 64 Buck Rasmussen DE ^{UR}; 93 Richard Seymour DE; 92 Ty Warren DE ^{R}	Linebackers: 54 Tedy Bruschi ILB; 58 Matt Chatham OLB; 51 Rosevelt Colvin OLB; 49 Don Davis ILB; 46 Jason Hunt OLB ^{UR}; 53 Larry Izzo ILB; 52 Ted Johnson ILB; 35 Courtney Ledyard ILB; 42 Chad Lee ILB ^{UR}; 95 Roman Phifer ILB; 59 Maugaula Tuitele ILB; 50 Mike Vrabel OLB; Defensive backs: 34 Chris Akins FS; 28 Dyshod Carter CB; 30 Je'Rod Cherry FS; 43 Scott Farley SS ^{UR}; 23 Antwan Harris FS; 37 Rodney Harrison FS; 31 Ben Kelly CB; 24 Ty Law CB; 39 Shawn Mayer FS ^{UR}; 29 Aric Morris SS; 36 Lawyer Milloy SS; 25 Leonard Myers CB; 38 Tyrone Poole CB; 22 Asante Samuel CB ^{R}; 45 Otis Smith CB; 26 Eugene Wilson CB ^{R}; Special teams: 66 Lonie Paxton LS; 8 Daniel Pope P; 4 Adam Vinatieri K; 13 Ken Walter P	Reserve lists: 63 Joe Andruzzi G (Active/PUP); 48 Tully Banta-Cain OLB (Active/PUP) ^{R}; 27 Mike Cloud RB (Active/NF-Inj.); 18 Chas Gessner WR (Active/PUP) ^{UR}; 81 Bethel Johnson WR (Active/NF-Inj.) ^{R}; 74 Kenyatta Jones T (Active/PUP); 55 Willie McGinest OLB (Active/NF-Inj.); 64 Gene Mruczkowski G (Active/NF-Inj.) ^{UR}; 32 Antowain Smith RB (Active/NF-Inj.); 65 Damien Woody C (Active/NF-Inj.); Exclusive-Rights FAs: 61 Stephen Neal G; Notations: R: 2003 Rookie; UR: 2003 Undrafted Rookie; Italicized players are not on the 80-man roster.

=== Week 1 roster ===
New England Patriots 2003 Week 1 roster
Quarterbacks: 12 Tom Brady; 6 Rohan Davey; 19 Damon Huard; Running backs: 31 Larry Centers FB; 33 Kevin Faulk KR; 44 Fred McCrary FB; 32 Antowain Smith; Wide receivers: 83 Deion Branch; 80 Troy Brown PR; 87 David Givens; 81 Bethel Johnson KR ^{R}; 86 David Patten; Tight ends: 84 Fred Baxter; 88 Christian Fauria; 82 Daniel Graham	Offensive linemen: 63 Joe Andruzzi G; 68 Tom Ashworth T; 77 Mike Compton G; 76 Brandon Gorin T; 70 Adrian Klemm T; 67 Dan Koppen C ^{R}; 72 Matt Light T; 65 Damien Woody C; Defensive linemen: 97 Jarvis Green DE; 91 Bobby Hamilton DE; 90 Dan Klecko NT ^{R}; 96 Rick Lyle NT/DE; 98 Anthony Pleasant DE; 93 Richard Seymour DE; 94 Ty Warren DE ^{R}; 92 Ted Washington NT	Linebackers: 54 Tedy Bruschi ILB; 58 Matt Chatham OLB; 59 Rosevelt Colvin OLB; 51 Don Davis ILB; 53 Larry Izzo ILB; 52 Ted Johnson ILB; 55 Willie McGinest OLB; 95 Roman Phifer ILB; 50 Mike Vrabel OLB; Defensive backs: 34 Chris Akins SS; 30 Je'Rod Cherry FS; 23 Antwan Harris FS; 37 Rodney Harrison SS; 24 Ty Law CB; 29 Aric Morris SS; 38 Tyrone Poole CB; 22 Asante Samuel CB ^{R}; 26 Eugene Wilson FS ^{R}; Special teams: 66 Lonie Paxton LS; 4 Adam Vinatieri K; 13 Ken Walter P	Reserve lists: 48 Tully Banta-Cain OLB (PUP) ^{R}; 75 Mike Clare C (IR); 21 Mike Cloud RB (Susp.); 18 Chas Gessner WR (PUP) ^{UR}; 74 Kenyatta Jones T (PUP); 15 Kliff Kingsbury QB (IR) ^{R}; 43 Courtney Ledyard MLB (IR); 16 Scott McCready WR (IR); 64 Gene Mruczkowski G (NF-Inj.) ^{UR}; 61 Stephen Neal G (PUP); 69 Brenden Stai G (IR); 10 Dan Stricker WR (IR) ^{UR}; Practice squad: 71 Russ Hochstein G; 99 Ethan Kelley NT ^{R}; 39 Shawn Mayer FS ^{UR}; 62 Tim Provost OT ^{R}; 75 Jamil Soriano G ^{UR}; Notations: R: 2003 Rookie; UR: 2003 Undrafted Rookie; Italicized players are not on the 53-man roster.

=== Final roster ===
New England Patriots 2003 final roster
Quarterbacks: 12 Tom Brady; 6 Rohan Davey; 19 Damon Huard; Running backs: 31 Larry Centers FB; 21 Mike Cloud; 33 Kevin Faulk KR; 35 Patrick Pass FB/KR; 32 Antowain Smith; Wide receivers: 83 Deion Branch; 80 Troy Brown PR; 87 David Givens; 81 Bethel Johnson KR ^{R}; 85 J.J. Stokes; 17 Dedric Ward; Tight ends: 84 Fred Baxter; 88 Christian Fauria; 82 Daniel Graham	Offensive linemen: 63 Joe Andruzzi G; 68 Tom Ashworth T; 60 Wilbert Brown G; 76 Brandon Gorin T; 71 Russ Hochstein G; 67 Dan Koppen C ^{R}; 72 Matt Light T; Defensive linemen: 97 Jarvis Green DE; 91 Bobby Hamilton DE; 90 Dan Klecko DT ^{R}; 96 Rick Lyle DT; 55 Willie McGinest DE; 98 Anthony Pleasant DE; 93 Richard Seymour DT; 94 Ty Warren DT ^{R}; 92 Ted Washington DT	Linebackers: 48 Tully Banta-Cain OLB ^{R}; 54 Tedy Bruschi MLB; 58 Matt Chatham OLB; 51 Don Davis OLB; 53 Larry Izzo OLB; 52 Ted Johnson MLB; 95 Roman Phifer OLB; 50 Mike Vrabel OLB; Defensive backs: 34 Chris Akins FS; 30 Je'Rod Cherry SS; 23 Antwan Harris SS; 37 Rodney Harrison SS; 24 Ty Law CB; 39 Shawn Mayer SS ^{UR}; 38 Tyrone Poole CB/PR; 22 Asante Samuel CB ^{R}; 26 Eugene Wilson FS ^{R}; Special teams: 46 Brian Kinchen LS; 4 Adam Vinatieri K; 13 Ken Walter P	Reserve lists: 59 Rosevelt Colvin LB (IR); 77 Mike Compton G (IR); 15 Kliff Kingsbury QB (IR) ^{R}; 70 Adrian Klemm T (IR); 44 Fred McCrary FB (IR); 49 Sean McDermott LS (IR); 64 Gene Mruczkowski G/C (IR) ^{UR}; 61 Stephen Neal G (IR); 86 David Patten WR (IR); 66 Lonie Paxton LS (IR); 65 Damien Woody C (IR); Practice squad: 10 Jamin Elliott WR; 18 Chas Gessner WR ^{UR}; 99 Ethan Kelley NT ^{R}; 62 Tim Provost T ^{R}; 75 Jamil Soriano G/T ^{UR}; Notations: R: 2003 Rookie; UR: 2003 Undrafted Rookie; Italicized players are not on the 53-man roster.; 53 active, 10 inactive, 5 practice squad

== Preseason ==
Week	Date	Opponent	Result	Record	Venue	Recap
1	August 7	New York Giants	W 26–6	1–0	Gillette Stadium	Recap
2	August 16	at Washington Redskins	W 20–13	2–0	FedExField	Recap
3	August 22	at Philadelphia Eagles	W 24–12	3–0	Lincoln Financial Field	Recap
4	August 27	Chicago Bears	W 38–23	4–0	Gillette Stadium	Recap

== Regular season ==
=== Schedule ===
Week	Date	Opponent	Result	Record	Venue	Recap
1	September 7	at Buffalo Bills	L 0–31	0–1	Ralph Wilson Stadium	Recap
2	September 14	at Philadelphia Eagles	W 31–10	1–1	Lincoln Financial Field	Recap
3	September 21	New York Jets	W 23–16	2–1	Gillette Stadium	Recap
4	September 28	at Washington Redskins	L 17–20	2–2	FedExField	Recap
5	October 5	Tennessee Titans	W 38–30	3–2	Gillette Stadium	Recap
6	October 12	New York Giants	W 17–6	4–2	Gillette Stadium	Recap
7	October 19	at Miami Dolphins	W 19–13 (OT)	5–2	Pro Player Stadium	Recap
8	October 26	Cleveland Browns	W 9–3	6–2	Gillette Stadium	Recap
9	November 3	at Denver Broncos	W 30–26	7–2	Invesco Field at Mile High	Recap
10	Bye					
11	November 16	Dallas Cowboys	W 12–0	8–2	Gillette Stadium	Recap
12	November 23	at Houston Texans	W 23–20 (OT)	9–2	Reliant Stadium	Recap
13	November 30	at Indianapolis Colts	W 38–34	10–2	RCA Dome	Recap
14	December 7	Miami Dolphins	W 12–0	11–2	Gillette Stadium	Recap
15	December 14	Jacksonville Jaguars	W 27–13	12–2	Gillette Stadium	Recap
16	December 20	at New York Jets	W 21–16	13–2	Giants Stadium	Recap
17	December 27	Buffalo Bills	W 31–0	14–2	Gillette Stadium	Recap

=== Game summaries ===
==== Week 1: at Buffalo Bills ====
Week 1: New England Patriots at Buffalo Bills – Game summary

Quarter	1	2	3	4	Total
Patriots	0	0	0	0	0
Bills	7	14	0	10	31

at Ralph Wilson Stadium, Orchard Park, New York

- Game time: 1:00 p.m. EDT
- Game weather: 72 °F (22 °C), partly sunny
- Game attendance: 73,262
- Referee: Jeff Triplette
- TV announcers (CBS): Verne Lundquist, Dan Dierdorf and Bonnie Bernstein
- Recap, Game Book

Game information

First quarter

- BUF – Travis Henry 1-yard run (Rian Lindell kick), 9:58. Bills 7–0. Drive: 9 plays, 80 yards, 5:02.

Second quarter

- BUF – Dave Moore 7-yard pass from Drew Bledsoe (Rian Lindell kick), 13:23. Bills 14–0. Drive: 15 plays, 90 yards, 9:28.
- BUF – Sam Adams 37-yard interception return (Rian Lindell kick), 10:14. Bills 21–0.

Third quarter

- No scoring plays

Fourth quarter

- BUF – Travis Henry 9-yard run (Rian Lindell kick), 13:21. Bills 28–0. Drive: 6 plays, 54 yards, 2:16.
- BUF – Rian Lindell 44-yard field goal, 4:16. Bills 31–0. Drive: 9 plays, 51 yards, 5:28.

Top passers

- NE – Tom Brady – 14/28, 123 yards, 4 INT
- BUF – Drew Bledsoe – 17/28, 230 yards, TD, INT

Top rushers

- NE – Kevin Faulk – 10 rushes, 62 yards
- BUF – Travis Henry – 27 rushes, 89 yards, 2 TD

Top receivers

- NE – David Patten – 2 receptions, 48 yards
- BUF – Eric Moulds – 4 receptions, 81 yards

Following the release of Lawyer Milloy, the Patriots met the Bills in Buffalo, and Milloy was there after signing a deal with the Bills. Drew Bledsoe threw for one touchdown while Tom Brady was picked off four times; in the second quarter defensive lineman Sam Adams (whose namesake father played for the Patriots alongside John Hannah) ran an interception back for a 37-yard touchdown. A still from Adams' run was used for the cover of Sports Illustrated. Brady was also sacked twice, once by Milloy, in a 31–0 Bills rout. This would be the last time the Patriots would hold a sub-.500 record until 145 games later, when they were 1–2 after their first three games of the 2012 season, and it was also their last regular season-opening loss until 2014. This was also their last shutout loss until week 14 of the 2006 season, and their last loss against the Bills until 2011, a fifteen-game streak which is the longest in the Bills-Patriots rivalry. It is Brady's worst loss by margin of defeat as a Patriot.

==== Week 2: at Philadelphia Eagles ====
Week 2: New England Patriots at Philadelphia Eagles – Game summary

Quarter	1	2	3	4	Total
Patriots	3	14	7	7	31
Eagles	0	7	0	3	10

at Lincoln Financial Field, Philadelphia, Pennsylvania

- Game time: 4:15 p.m. EDT
- Game weather: 82 °F (28 °C), mostly cloudy
- Game attendance: 67,624
- Referee: Walt Coleman
- TV announcers (CBS): Greg Gumbel, Phil Simms and Armen Keteyian
- Recap, Game Book

Game information

First quarter

- NE – Adam Vinatieri 23-yard field goal, 1:10. Patriots 3–0. Drive: 11 plays, 66 yards, 5:23.

Second quarter

- PHI – Duce Staley 2-yard run (David Akers kick), 14:00. Eagles 7–3. Drive: 8 plays, 67 yards, 2:10.
- NE – Christian Fauria 8-yard pass from Tom Brady (Adam Vinatieri kick), 7:59. Patriots 10–7. Drive: 4 plays, 35 yards, 1:12.
- NE – Christian Fauria 5-yard pass from Tom Brady (Adam Vinatieri kick), 2:09. Patriots 17–7. Drive: 2 plays, 14 yards, 0:43.

Third quarter

- NE – Deion Branch 26-yard pass from Tom Brady (Adam Vinatieri kick), 7:02. Patriots 24–7. Drive: 4 plays, 52 yards, 2:08.

Fourth quarter

- PHI – David Akers 57-yard field goal, 10:48. Patriots 24–10. Drive: 5 plays, -4 yards, 1:14.
- NE – Tedy Bruschi 18-yard interception return (Adam Vinatieri kick), 5:02. Patriots 31–10.

Top passers

- NE – Tom Brady – 30/44, 255 yards, 3 TD
- PHI – Donovan McNabb – 18/46, 186 yards, 2 INT

Top rushers

- NE – Antowain Smith – 12 rushes, 25 yards
- PHI – Donovan McNabb – 5 rushes, 54 yards

Top receivers

- NE – Deion Branch – 6 receptions, 89 yards, TD
- PHI – James Thrash – 6 receptions, 80 yards

Behind 30 completions in 44 attempts for 247 yards and three touchdowns (two to Christian Fauria and one to Deion Branch), Tom Brady led the Patriots to their first win of the season over the Eagles. Donovan McNabb was hammered by the Patriots defense, limited to just 18 completions in 46 throws; he was picked off twice (Tedy Bruschi ran back an interception for an 18-yard touchdown) and sacked eight times. The Patriots came into the late-afternoon game after hearing ESPN's NFL pregame show where analyst Tom Jackson stated outright "They hate their coach", even though no effort at verification on the part of Jackson had ever been made. Bill Belichick was incensed by the comment and refused to speak to anyone connected with ESPN outside of Chris Berman (a friend of Belichick's) for years after.

==== Week 3: vs. New York Jets ====
Week 3: New York Jets at New England Patriots – Game summary

Quarter	1	2	3	4	Total
Jets	3	3	3	7	16
Patriots	3	3	10	7	23

at Gillette Stadium, Foxborough, Massachusetts

- Game time: 1:00 p.m. EDT
- Game weather: 71 °F (22 °C), sunny and warm
- Game attendance: 68,436
- Referee: Walt Anderson
- TV announcers (CBS): Dick Enberg, Dan Dierdorf and Bonnie Bernstein
- Recap, Game Book

Game information

First quarter

- NYJ – Doug Brien 41-yard field goal, 11:45. Jets 3–0. Drive: 6 plays, 49 yards, 3:15.
- NE – Adam Vinatieri 24-yard field goal, 5:58. Tied 3–3. Drive: 11 plays, 64 yards, 5:47.

Second quarter

- NE – Adam Vinatieri 22-yard field goal, 14:50. Patriots 6–3. Drive: 11 plays, 66 yards, 4:49.
- NYJ – Doug Brien 39-yard field goal, 6:33. Tied 6–6. Drive: 6 plays, 40 yards, 2:09.

Third quarter

- NE – Adam Vinatieri 47-yard field goal, 10:10. Patriots 9–6. Drive: 10 plays, 45 yards, 4:50.
- NYJ – Doug Brien 30-yard field goal, 5:37. Tied 9–9. Drive: 4 plays, 1 yard, 1:26.
- NE – Tom Brady 1-yard run (Adam Vinatieri kick), 2:08. Patriots 16–9. Drive: 7 plays, 73 yards, 3:29.

Fourth quarter

- NE – Asante Samuel 55-yard interception return (Adam Vinatieri kick), 14:49. Patriots 23–9.
- NYJ – Wayne Chrebet 29-yard pass from Vinny Testaverde (Doug Brien kick), 12:53. Patriots 23–16. Drive: 4 plays, 68 yards, 1:56.

Top passers

- NYJ – Vinny Testaverde – 25/43, 264 yards, TD, INT
- NE – Tom Brady – 15/25, 181 yards

Top rushers

- NYJ – Curtis Martin – 15 rushes, 53 yards
- NE – Kevin Faulk – 17 rushes, 79 yards

Top receivers

- NYJ – Curtis Conway – 5 receptions, 70 yards
- NE – Christian Fauria – 3 receptions, 49 yards

The Patriots' home opener came against an injury-shot Jets squad; Chad Pennington had been injured in the preseason and former Jets starter Vinny Testaverde had to take over. It was the Jets' first game against New England since a 44–7 Patriots victory in September 2002. Like in the 2002 matchup, the Patriots shut down New York's running game, holding them to 65 yards, 53 of them from former Patriot Curtis Martin. Kevin Faulk and Antowain Smith rushed for 134 yards, Tom Brady threw for 181 yards, but until the final five minutes of the third quarter, it was a battle of field goals — tied at 9 until Brady ran in a one-yard score. At the start of the fourth quarter, rookie Asante Samuel picked off Testaverde and ran back a 55-yard touchdown. Vinny would connect with Wayne Chrebet two minutes later, but the remaining thirteen minutes went scoreless as the Patriots took the win 23–16.

==== Week 4: at Washington Redskins ====
Week 4: New England Patriots at Washington Redskins – Game summary

Quarter	1	2	3	4	Total
Patriots	3	0	7	7	17
Redskins	3	3	14	0	20

at FedExField, Landover, Maryland

- Game time: 1:00 p.m. EDT
- Game weather: 65 °F (18 °C), sunny
- Game attendance: 83,632
- Referee: Tom White
- TV announcers (CBS): Greg Gumbel, Phil Simms and Armen Keteyian
- Recap, Game Book

Game information

First quarter

- WSH – John Hall 38-yard field goal, 9:42. Redskins 3–0. Drive: 11 plays, 51 yards, 5:18.
- NE – Adam Vinatieri 23-yard field goal, 2:12. Tied 3–3. Drive: 13 plays, 67 yards, 7:30.

Second quarter

- WSH – John Hall 29-yard field goal, 11:40. Redskins 6–3. Drive: 10 plays, 57 yards, 5:32.

Third quarter

- WSH – Ladell Betts 1-yard run (John Hall kick), 13:35. Redskins 13–3. Drive: 1 play, 1 yard, 0:03.
- WSH – Rock Cartwright 3-yard run (John Hall kick), 5:08. Redskins 20–3. Drive: 5 plays, 64 yards, 3:07.
- NE – David Givens 29-yard pass from Tom Brady (Adam Vinatieri kick), 2:13. Redskins 20–10. Drive: 5 plays, 71 yards, 2:55.

Fourth quarter

- NE – Larry Centers 7-yard pass from Tom Brady (Adam Vinatieri kick), 2:10. Redskins 20–17. Drive: 6 plays, 68 yards, 1:24.

Top passers

- NE – Tom Brady – 25/38, 289 yards, 2 TD, 3 INT
- WSH – Patrick Ramsey – 10/22, 147 yards

Top rushers

- NE – Antowain Smith – 14 rushes, 56 yards
- WSH – Trung Canidate – 12 rushes, 70 yards

Top receivers

- NE – David Givens – 4 receptions, 57 yards, TD
- WSH – Laveranues Coles – 5 receptions, 62 yards

Steve Spurrier became the last NFL coach to defeat the Patriots until Halloween 2004 as the Redskins raced to a 20–3 lead in the third quarter. Adam Vinatieri missed a field goal try for the first time in the year, and Tom Brady was picked off twice in Washington's red zone. Ladell Betts and Rock Cartwright ran in touchdowns as the Redskins ground game (led by Trung Canidate's 70 yards) ate up 119 yards. It was enough to hold off two late Brady touchdowns in a 20–17 Patriots loss. This would be the Patriots last loss to Washington until 2023.

==== Week 5: vs. Tennessee Titans ====
Week 5: Tennessee Titans at New England Patriots – Game summary

Quarter	1	2	3	4	Total
Titans	6	7	3	14	30
Patriots	7	0	14	17	38

at Gillette Stadium, Foxborough, Massachusetts

- Game time: 1:00 p.m. EDT
- Game weather: 53 °F (12 °C), sunny
- Game attendance: 68,436
- Referee: Ron Winter
- TV announcers (CBS): Gus Johnson and Brent Jones
- Recap, Game Book

Game information

First quarter

- TEN – Craig Hentrich 48-yard field goal, 10:43. Titans 3–0. Drive: 9 plays, 29 yards, 4:17.
- TEN – Gary Anderson 43-yard field goal, 3:06. Titans 6–0. Drive: 11 plays, 50 yards, 5:48.
- NE – Troy Brown 58-yard pass from Tom Brady (Adam Vinatieri kick), 1:00. Patriots 7–6. Drive: 5 plays, 69 yards, 2:06.

Second quarter

- TEN – Steve McNair 1-yard run (Gary Anderson kick), 1:58. Titans 13–7. Drive: 5 plays, 44 yards, 1:08.

Third quarter

- NE – Antowain Smith 1-yard run (Adam Vinatieri kick), 9:25. Patriots 14–13. Drive: 11 plays, 59 yards, 5:35.
- TEN – Gary Anderson 33-yard field goal, 5:31. Titans 16–14. Drive: 8 plays, 60 yards, 3:54.
- NE – Mike Cloud 1-yard run (Adam Vinatieri kick), 0:58. Patriots 21–16. Drive: 10 plays, 64 yards, 4:33.

Fourth quarter

- TEN – Gary Anderson 37-yard field goal, 13:19. Patriots 21–19. Drive: 6 plays, 50 yards, 2:39.
- NE – Adam Vinatieri 48-yard field goal, 11:47. Patriots 24–19. Drive: 5 plays, 40 yards, 1:32.
- TEN – Steve McNair 1-yard run (Steve McNair–Tyrone Calico pass), 4:40. Titans 27–24. Drive: 17 plays, 86 yards, 7:07.
- NE – Mike Cloud 15-yard run (Adam Vinatieri kick), 3:14. Patriots 31–27. Drive: 4 plays, 30 yards, 1:26.
- NE – Ty Law 65-yard interception return (Adam Vinatieri kick), 1:49. Patriots 38–27.
- TEN – Gary Anderson 41-yard field goal, 0:36. Patriots 38–30. Drive: 6 plays, 54 yards, 1:13.

Top passers

- TEN – Steve McNair – 23/45, 360 yards, INT
- NE – Tom Brady – 17/31, 219 yards, TD

Top rushers

- TEN – Eddie George – 15 rushes, 35 yards
- NE – Antowain Smith – 16 rushes, 80 yards, TD

Top receivers

- TEN – Derrick Mason – 8 receptions, 99 yards
- NE – Deion Branch – 5 receptions, 68 yards

The Patriots began a 21-game winning streak while hosting the Titans, who had beaten the Patriots the previous December. Nursing the shoulder injury incurred in the 2002 game against the Titans that had flamed up again, Brady threw for a comparatively modest 219 yards and a 58-yard score to Troy Brown. The game lead changed seven times as Steve McNair threw for 360 yards and rushed in two touchdowns, Patriots running backs Antowain Smith and Mike Cloud rushed for 153 yards and three scores, and rookie Bethel Johnson ran back a fourth-quarter kick 71 yards, setting up Cloud's second touchdown. The decisive score came when McNair was picked off by a hobbling Ty Law for a 65-yard touchdown — McNair threw to Tyrone Calico (who had a 60-yard touchdown called back when he was ruled out of bounds inside the 5-yard line), but Calico slipped to the ground just as Law jumped into his route — and a 38–30 Patriots triumph. Fans cheering for the Red Sox–Oakland A's playoff game concurrent with Tennessee's scoring drives caused a stir on the sidelines and in the CBS and Patriots radio broadcast booths.

==== Week 6: vs. New York Giants ====
Week 6: New York Giants at New England Patriots – Game summary

Quarter	1	2	3	4	Total
Giants	3	0	0	3	6
Patriots	7	0	10	0	17

at Gillette Stadium, Foxborough, Massachusetts

- Game time: 1:00 p.m. EDT
- Game weather: 55 °F (13 °C), occasional rain
- Game attendance: 68,436
- Referee: Bill Carollo
- TV announcers (Fox): Kenny Albert, Daryl Johnston and Tony Siragusa
- Recap, Game Book

Game information

First quarter

- NE – Matt Chatham 38-yard fumble return (Adam Vinatieri kick), 12:24. Patriots 7–0.
- NYG – Brett Conway 22-yard field goal, 8:09. Patriots 7–3. Drive: 10 plays, 64 yards, 4:15.

Second quarter

- No scoring plays

Third quarter

- NE – Adam Vinatieri 28-yard field goal, 10:39. Patriots 10–3. Drive: 9 plays, 63 yards, 4:21.
- NE – Mike Cloud 1-yard run (Adam Vinatieri kick), 4:22. Patriots 17–3. Drive: 10 plays, 85 yards, 4:17.

Fourth quarter

- NYG – Brett Conway 34-yard field goal, 13:42. Patriots 17–6. Drive: 12 plays, 63 yards, 5:40.

Top passers

- NYG – Kerry Collins – 35/59, 314 yards, 4 INT
- NE – Tom Brady – 8/21, 112 yards

Top rushers

- NYG – Tiki Barber – 22 rushes, 72 yards
- NE – Kevin Faulk – 14 rushes, 87 yards

Top receivers

- NYG – Jeremy Shockey – 8 receptions, 80 yards
- NE – David Patten – 3 receptions, 55 yards

In a rainstorm that postponed Game Four of the 2003 ALCS later that night, the Patriots hosted the New York Giants. The first throw by Kerry Collins was batted in the air and intercepted, leading to a Patriots field goal attempt that missed. Later, Tiki Barber was hit and fumbled to Matt Chatham, who ran in a 30-yard touchdown. Collins was picked off four times as the Patriots grounded out a 17–6 win.

==== Week 7: at Miami Dolphins ====
Week 7: New England Patriots at Miami Dolphins – Game summary

Quarter	1	2	3	4	OT	Total
Patriots	3	3	7	0	6	19
Dolphins	0	10	3	0	0	13

at Pro Player Stadium, Miami Gardens, Florida

- Game time: 1:00 p.m. EDT
- Game weather: 84 °F (29 °C), mostly sunny
- Game attendance: 73,650
- Referee: Gerald Austin
- TV announcers (CBS): Dick Enberg, Dan Dierdorf and Bonnie Bernstein
- Recap, Game Book

Game information

First quarter

- NE – Adam Vinatieri 25-yard field goal, 2:24. Patriots 3–0. Drive: 7 plays, 19 yards, 3:33.

Second quarter

- MIA – Chris Chambers 6-yard pass from Jay Fiedler (Olindo Mare kick), 10:03. Dolphins 7–3. Drive: 5 plays, 16 yards, 2:46.
- MIA – Olindo Mare 23-yard field goal, 5:08. Dolphins 10–3. Drive: 7 plays, 35 yards, 4:08.
- NE – Adam Vinatieri 30-yard field goal, 0:02. Dolphins 10–6. Drive: 11 plays, 54 yards, 5:06.

Third quarter

- MIA – Olindo Mare 34-yard field goal, 9:46. Dolphins 13–6. Drive: 7 plays, 34 yards, 3:35.
- NE – David Givens 24-yard pass from Tom Brady (Adam Vinatieri kick), 1:49. Tied 13–13. Drive: 14 plays, 76 yards, 7:57.

Fourth quarter

- No scoring plays

Overtime

- NE – Troy Brown 82-yard pass from Tom Brady (Adam Vinatieri kick), 5:45. Patriots 19–13. Drive: 1 play, 82 yards, 0:12.

Top passers

- NE – Tom Brady – 24/34, 283 yards, 2 TD
- MIA – Jay Fiedler – 20/35, 230 yards, TD, 2 INT

Top rushers

- NE – Kevin Faulk – 18 rushes, 38 yards
- MIA – Ricky Williams – 27 rushes, 94 yards

Top receivers

- NE – Troy Brown – 6 receptions, 131 yards, TD
- MIA – Randy McMichael – 8 receptions, 102 yards

Battling the Dolphins for the division lead, the Patriots erased a 13–6 gap with a Brady touchdown pass to David Givens in the third. The Dolphins marched downfield late in the fourth; during this drive, a Ricky Williams first down run was protested by the Patriots who felt Williams' knee touched the dirt infield at Pro Player Stadium, but the challenge was denied. The Dolphins attempted a 35-yard field goal at the two-minute warning, but the kick was blocked by Richard Seymour. The Dolphins smothered the Patriots' final drive attempt (the decisive play came when former Patriot Terrell Buckley stopped Kevin Faulk for a four-yard loss) and the game went to overtime. Controversy ensued on the coin flip for overtime; referee Gerald Austin used a silver dollar; the coin came up Lady Columbia (which is "heads" on a silver dollar) but Patriot captains Brady and Seymour protested that it came up "tails." The Dolphins drove downfield but missed another 35-yard field goal try, in part because Olindo Mare could not plant his foot on the infield dirt, which was still in place because of the Florida Marlins' run towards their 2003 World Series victory. After forcing a Patriots punt, Jay Fiedler was hit by Tedy Bruschi and lobbed a 60-yard pass which was picked off at the Patriots 18-yard line by Tyrone Poole. Brady then ended the game with a spectacular 82-yard touchdown strike to Troy Brown and a 19–13 final.

==== Week 8: vs. Cleveland Browns ====
Week 8: Cleveland Browns at New England Patriots – Game summary

Quarter	1	2	3	4	Total
Browns	0	3	0	0	3
Patriots	3	0	3	3	9

at Gillette Stadium, Foxborough, Massachusetts

- Game time: 1:00 p.m. EST
- Game weather: 62 °F (17 °C), cloudy with occasional drizzle
- Game attendance: 68,436
- Referee: Bernie Kukar
- TV announcers (CBS): Dick Enberg, Dan Dierdorf and Bonnie Bernstein
- Recap, Game Book

Game information

First quarter

- NE – Adam Vinatieri 27-yard field goal, 11:46. Patriots 3–0. Drive: 5 plays, 42 yards, 2:06.

Second quarter

- CLE – Phil Dawson 29-yard field goal, 0:24. Tied 3–3. Drive: 12 plays, 51 yards, 2:51.

Third quarter

- NE – Adam Vinatieri 28-yard field goal, 3:36. Patriots 6–3. Drive: 8 plays, 70 yards, 4:06.

Fourth quarter

- NE – Adam Vinatieri 38-yard field goal, 2:05. Patriots 9–3. Drive: 11 plays, 41 yards, 4:59.

Top passers

- CLE – Kelly Holcomb – 15/25, 115 yards, INT
- NE – Tom Brady – 20/33, 259 yards

Top rushers

- CLE – James Jackson – 15 rushes, 71 yards
- NE – Kevin Faulk – 23 rushes, 96 yards

Top receivers

- CLE – Steve Heiden – 6 receptions, 34 yards
- NE – Daniel Graham – 7 receptions, 110 yards

Despite 367 yards of offense, the Patriots could only muster three Adam Vinatieri field goals, with his fifth miss of the season added in. The Patriots' defense limited the Browns to 203 yards of offense while Ty Law picked off Kelly Holcomb for Law's second interception of the season. Holcomb was also sacked three times as the Browns limped home after a 9–3 Patriots win. During the game, an apparent Browns fumble was overturned based on the rule immortalized in New England’s 2001 game vs the Raiders.

==== Week 9: at Denver Broncos ====
Week 9: New England Patriots at Denver Broncos – Game summary

Quarter	1	2	3	4	Total
Patriots	7	6	7	10	30
Broncos	7	10	7	2	26

at Invesco Field at Mile High, Denver, Colorado

- Game time: 9:00 p.m. EST/7:00 p.m. MST
- Game weather: 35 °F (2 °C), foggy
- Game attendance: 76,203
- Referee: Pete Morelli
- TV announcers (ABC): Al Michaels, John Madden and Lisa Guerrero
- Recap, Game Book

Game information

First quarter

- DEN – Clinton Portis 15-yard run (Jason Elam kick), 10:51. Broncos 7–0. Drive: 4 plays, 28 yards, 1:55.
- NE – Deion Branch 66-yard pass from Tom Brady (Adam Vinatieri kick), 5:55. Tied 7–7. Drive: 1 play, 66 yards, 0:09.

Second quarter

- DEN – Jason Elam 43-yard field goal, 11:29. Broncos 10–7. Drive: 5 plays, 17 yards, 1:38.
- NE – Adam Vinatieri 40-yard field goal, 7:57. Tied 10–10. Drive: 7 plays, 58 yards, 3:32.
- DEN – Mike Anderson 1-yard pass from Danny Kanell (Micah Knorr kick), 0:24. Broncos 17–10. Drive: 14 plays, 72 yards, 7:33.
- NE – Adam Vinatieri 46-yard field goal, 0:01. Broncos 17–13. Drive: 2 plays, 8 yards, 0:23.

Third quarter

- NE – Daniel Graham 6-yard pass from Tom Brady (Adam Vinatieri kick), 5:57. Patriots 20–17. Drive: 8 plays, 56 yards, 3:46.
- DEN – Deltha O'Neal 57-yard punt return (Micah Knorr kick), 3:13. Broncos 24–20.

Fourth quarter

- NE – Adam Vinatieri 28-yard field goal, 11:08. Broncos 24–23. Drive: 11 plays, 59 yards, 7:05.
- DEN – Lonie Paxton fumble out of bounds in the end zone for a Safety, 2:49. Broncos 26–23
- NE – David Givens 18-yard pass from Tom Brady (Adam Vinatieri kick), 0:30. Patriots 30–26. Drive: 6 plays, 58 yards, 1:45.

Top passers

- NE – Tom Brady – 20/35, 350 yards, 3 TD, INT
- DEN – Danny Kanell – 16/35, 163 yards, TD, INT

Top rushers

- NE – Antowain Smith – 17 rushes, 55 yards
- DEN – Clinton Portis – 26 rushes, 111 yards, TD

Top receivers

- NE – Deion Branch – 3 receptions, 107 yards, TD
- DEN – Rod Smith – 4 receptions, 58 yards

The Patriots made their only appearance on Monday Night Football of the season in this matchup against the Broncos, who had beaten the Patriots in 13 of the two teams' 15 previous meetings. The Broncos held a 24–23 lead in the fourth with backup quarterback Danny Kanell starting and despite injuries to receiver Ed McCaffrey and kicker Jason Elam. Backed up to their one-yard line, the Patriots were forced to punt, but with so little room to work, they snapped the ball through the endzone for a deliberate safety. On the ensuing free kick, the Patriots pinned the Broncos near their own goal line and forced a Denver punt. In the final two minutes, the Patriots drove downfield, and Tom Brady fired an 18-yard touchdown strike to David Givens. Kanell threw a long pass that was intercepted by rookie Asante Samuel with seven seconds left, securing a 30–26 Patriots win.

==== Week 11: vs. Dallas Cowboys ====
Week 11: Dallas Cowboys at New England Patriots – Game summary

Quarter	1	2	3	4	Total
Cowboys	0	0	0	0	0
Patriots	3	6	0	3	12

at Gillette Stadium, Foxborough, Massachusetts

- Game time: 8:30 p.m. EST
- Game weather: 33 °F (1 °C), cloudy and calm
- Game attendance: 68,436
- Referee: Tom White
- TV announcers (ESPN): Mike Patrick, Joe Theismann, Paul Maguire and Suzy Kolber
- Recap, Game Book

Game information

First quarter

- NE – Adam Vinatieri 23-yard field goal, 3:05. Patriots 3–0. Drive: 10 plays, 70 yards, 3:38.

Second quarter

- NE – Antowain Smith 2-yard run (kick blocked), 2:34. Patriots 9–0. Drive: 6 plays, 80 yards, 2:22.

Third quarter

- No scoring plays

Fourth quarter

- NE – Adam Vinatieri 26-yard field goal, 1:56. Patriots 12–0. Drive: 9 plays, 36 yards, 5:28.

Top passers

- DAL – Quincy Carter – 20/36, 210 yards, 3 INT
- NE – Tom Brady – 15/34, 212 yards

Top rushers

- DAL – Troy Hambrick – 16 rushes, 41 yards
- NE – Antowain Smith – 16 rushes, 51 yards, TD

Top receivers

- DAL – Richie Anderson – 8 receptions, 85 yards
- NE – Deion Branch – 2 receptions, 69 yards

For only the second time in their history, the Patriots defeated the Cowboys. Both teams entered the Sunday Night Football contest at 7–2, and the game was the first showdown between Bill Belichick and former Patriots coach Bill Parcells. The Cowboys gained only 291 yards of offense, but the Patriots were limited to 268 yards; three Quincy Carter interceptions (two by Ty Law) proved decisive. The Patriots managed two Adam Vinatieri field goals and a two-yard Antowain Smith touchdown marred by a blocked PAT. With a 12–0 win, the Patriots continued their winning streak from the end of September.

==== Week 12: at Houston Texans ====
Week 12: New England Patriots at Houston Texans – Game summary

Quarter	1	2	3	4	OT	Total
Patriots	0	10	0	10	3	23
Texans	3	0	7	10	0	20

at Reliant Stadium, Houston, Texas

- Game time: 1:00 p.m. EST/12:00 p.m. CST
- Game weather: Played with roof closed, retractable roof stadium
- Game attendance: 70,719
- Referee: Mike Carey
- TV announcers (CBS): Kevin Harlan, Randy Cross and Marcus Allen
- Recap

Game information

First quarter

- HOU – Kris Brown 19-yard field goal, 2:36. Texans 3–0. Drive: 14 plays, 79 yards, 8:41.

Second quarter

- NE – Bethel Johnson 27-yard pass from Tom Brady (Adam Vinatieri kick), 13:12. Patriots 7–3. Drive: 10 plays, 67 yards, 4:24.
- NE – Adam Vinatieri 21-yard field goal, 5:55. Patriots 10–3. Drive: 4 plays, 4 yards, 2:02.

Third quarter

- HOU – Andre Johnson 10-yard pass from Tony Banks (Kris Brown kick), 4:01. Tied 10–10. Drive: 2 plays, 11 yards, 0:32.

Fourth quarter

- NE – Adam Vinatieri 32-yard field goal, 14:57. Patriots 13–10. Drive: 9 plays, 56 yards, 4:04.
- HOU – Billy Miller 16-yard pass from Tony Banks (Kris Brown kick), 6:49. Texans 17–13. Drive: 5 plays, 31 yards, 2:10.
- HOU – Kris Brown 31-yard field goal, 3:11. Texans 20–13. Drive: 4 plays, 8 yards, 1:39.
- NE – Daniel Graham 4-yard pass from Tom Brady (Adam Vinatieri kick), 0:40. Tied 20–20. Drive: 9 plays, 80 yards, 2:31.

Overtime

- NE – Adam Vinatieri 28-yard field goal, 0:41. Patriots 23–20. Drive: 9 plays, 76 yards, 3:39.

Top passers

- NE – Tom Brady – 29/47, 368 yards, 2 TD, 2 INT
- HOU – Tony Banks – 10/25, 93 yards, 2 TD, INT

Top rushers

- NE – Kevin Faulk – 23 rushes, 80 yards
- HOU – Domanick Davis – 24 rushes, 69 yards

Top receivers

- NE – Kevin Faulk – 8 receptions, 108 yards
- HOU – Andre Johnson – 4 receptions, 37 yards

Facing their future defensive coach Dom Capers, the Patriots made their first trip to Houston since 1988's 31–6 loss to the Oilers at the Astrodome. The Patriots led 10–3 at the half, but Adam Vinatieri missed a 38-yard field goal try at the end of the half, his first miss inside a dome in his career. Tony Banks erupted for three second-half touchdowns as the Texans' defense bullied the Patriots into a fumble (recovered by Jay Foreman) and a Tom Brady INT. Trailing 20–13 in the final minutes of regulation, the Patriots drove downfield; at the Texans' 4-yard line, Brady was chased out of the pocket and threw a pass caught in the endzone in mid-air by Daniel Graham. In overtime, a 37-yard Vinatieri field goal try was blocked by Ramon Walker, but the Texans were forced to punt. Late in overtime the Texans' Marlon McCree picked off Brady at his 5-yard line, but a holding penalty nullified the turnover, and Vinatieri kicked the game-winner with 41 seconds left in overtime and a 23–20 Patriots win. The game marked the last time New England would trail in any 2003 contest until Super Bowl XXXVIII (which also took place in Houston).

==== Week 13: at Indianapolis Colts ====
Week 13: New England Patriots at Indianapolis Colts – Game summary

Quarter	1	2	3	4	Total
Patriots	10	14	7	7	38
Colts	0	10	14	10	34

at the RCA Dome, Indianapolis, Indiana

- Game time: 1:00 p.m. EST
- Game weather: Played indoors, domed stadium
- Game attendance: 57,102
- Referee: Bill Leavy
- TV announcers (CBS): Greg Gumbel, Phil Simms and Armen Keteyian
- Recap, Game Book

Game information

First quarter

- NE – Adam Vinatieri 43-yard field goal, 9:04. Patriots 3–0. Drive: 11 plays, 50 yards, 5:56.
- NE – Mike Cloud 4-yard run (Adam Vinatieri kick), 2:32. Patriots 10–0. Drive: 6 plays, 36 yards, 2:32.

Second quarter

- NE – Dedric Ward 31-yard pass from Tom Brady (Adam Vinatieri kick), 11:54. Patriots 17–0. Drive: 9 plays, 73 yards, 4:03.
- IND – Mike Vanderjagt 40-yard field goal, 7:04. Patriots 17–3. Drive: 10 plays, 53 yards, 4:50.
- IND – Marcus Pollard 8-yard pass from Peyton Manning (Mike Vanderjagt kick), 0:12. Patriots 17–10. Drive: 11 plays, 86 yards, 3:20.
- NE – Bethel Johnson 92-yard kickoff return (Adam Vinatieri kick), 0:00. Patriots 24–10. Drive: 0 plays, 0 yards, 0:12.

Third quarter

- NE – Mike Cloud 1-yard run (Adam Vinatieri kick), 7:36. Patriots 31–10. Drive: 11 plays, 61 yards, 5:33.
- IND – Reggie Wayne 13-yard pass from Peyton Manning (Mike Vanderjagt kick), 1:20. Patriots 31–17. Drive: 9 plays, 44 yards, 4:04.
- IND – Marvin Harrison 26-yard pass from Peyton Manning (Mike Vanderjagt kick), 0:14. Patriots 31–24. Drive: 1 play, 26 yards, 0:06.

Fourth quarter

- IND – Troy Walters 6-yard pass from Peyton Manning (Mike Vanderjagt kick), 10:21. Tied 31–31. Drive: 9 play, 69 yards, 3:47.
- NE – Deion Branch 13-yard pass from Tom Brady (Adam Vinatieri kick), 8:36. Patriots 38–31. Drive: 4 plays, 31 yards, 1:45.
- IND – Mike Vanderjagt 29-yard field goal, 3:27. Patriots 38–34. Drive: 4 plays, 0 yards, 0:18.

Top passers

- NE – Tom Brady – 26/35, 236 yards, 2 TD, 2 INT
- IND – Peyton Manning – 29/48, 278 yards, 4 TD, INT

Top rushers

- NE – Kevin Faulk – 15 rushes, 42 yards
- IND – Edgerrin James – 25 rushes, 88 yards

Top receivers

- NE – Deion Branch – 6 receptions, 64 yards, TD
- IND – Marvin Harrison – 7 receptions, 88 yards, TD

Though Tom Brady had faced Peyton Manning twice coming in, this game marked the true beginning of the most celebrated quarterback rivalry in NFL history. The game was the Patriots' first meeting with the Colts since 2002 divisional realignment put the Colts into the new AFC South after 32 seasons with the Pats in the AFC East. The two teams stood at 9–2, the latest in a season two teams with nine wins had met. The Patriots raced to a 17–3 second-quarter lead behind scores by Mike Cloud and Dedric Ward. Following a Peyton Manning touchdown to Marcus Pollard with 12 seconds left in the first half, Bethel Johnson ran back the ensuing kick 92 yards for a touchdown. But the Patriot's 31–10 runaway following another Cloud touchdown became an epic shootout as two Brady interceptions gave the Colts touchdown drives, and they tied the game at 31 at 4:39 of the fourth. Another monster Johnson kick return set up a Brady to Deion Branch touchdown, but after a Kevin Faulk fumble and ensuing Mike Vanderjagt field goal the score stood at 38–34 Patriots. A short Ken Walter punt led to a Colts drive to the Patriot's goal line in the final minute. A heroic goal-line stand led by Willie McGinest and Ted Washington stopped the Colts from scoring and the win left several Patriots visibly shaken. Rodney Harrison noted afterward that he'd "never seen anything like this." The two teams combined for 582 yards of offense.

==== Week 14: vs. Miami Dolphins ====
Week 14: Miami Dolphins at New England Patriots – Game summary

Quarter	1	2	3	4	Total
Dolphins	0	0	0	0	0
Patriots	3	0	0	9	12

at Gillette Stadium, Foxborough, Massachusetts

- Game time: 4:15 p.m. EST
- Game weather: 28 °F (−2 °C), snow, windy, cold
- Game attendance: 68,436
- Referee: Bernie Kukar
- TV announcers (CBS): Kevin Harlan and Randy Cross
- Recap, Game Book

Game information

First quarter

- NE – Adam Vinatieri 29-yard field goal, 1:46. Patriots 3–0. Drive: 13 plays, 41 yards, 6:22.

Second quarter

- No scoring plays

Third quarter

- No scoring plays

Fourth quarter

- NE – Tedy Bruschi 5-yard interception return (Adam Vinatieri kick), 8:55. Patriots 10–0.
- NE – Jay Fiedler sacked in the end zone by Jarvis Green, Mike Vrabel for a safety, 1:13. Patriots 12–0.

Top passers

- MIA – Jay Fiedler – 13/31, 111 yards, 2 INT
- NE – Tom Brady – 16/31, 163 yards

Top rushers

- MIA – Ricky Williams – 25 rushes, 68 yards
- NE – Antowain Smith – 27 rushes, 60 yards

Top receivers

- MIA – Chris Chambers – 4 receptions, 32 yards
- NE – Deion Branch – 6 receptions, 93 yards

The Dolphins traveled to Foxboro to face the Patriots at the tail end of a snowstorm that dumped well over a foot of snow on the area. The only scoring of the first three quarters came late in the first quarter, when Adam Vinatieri hit a 29-yard field goal to put the Patriots ahead. With both offenses struggling, the Patriots missed a chance to open a wider lead when Vinatieri missed a 54-yard field goal at the end of the first half. The Dolphins threatened the Patriots offensively for the first time in the game late in the third quarter, advancing to the Patriots' 10-yard line before Rodney Harrison strip-sacked Jay Fiedler, with Mike Vrabel recovering the fumble for the Patriots (and embarrassing Dolphins rookie TE Randy McMichael, who had talked trash about the Patriots before the game but blew his blocking assignment against Harrison on this play). In the fourth quarter, punter Brooks Barnard (replacing Ken Walter, who had been cut a week after poor punts against the Colts), would pin the Dolphins at their own 4-yard line. Fiedler's first pass was intercepted by Tedy Bruschi and returned five yards for a touchdown. The play became notable more for the fans' celebration afterward, as they would throw the fallen snow in the air in a form of "snow fireworks." At the two-minute warning, Brady would pooch-punt and pin the Dolphins at their own 1-yard line; Fiedler was sacked a few plays later for a safety that sealed a 12–0 Patriots victory and the division title.

==== Week 15: vs. Jacksonville Jaguars ====
Week 15: Jacksonville Jaguars at New England Patriots – Game summary

Quarter	1	2	3	4	Total
Jaguars	3	3	0	7	13
Patriots	7	6	0	14	27

at Gillette Stadium, Foxborough, Massachusetts

- Game time: 1:00 p.m. EST
- Game weather: 25 °F (−4 °C), cloudy, cold, snow expected
- Game attendance: 68,436
- Referee: Walt Anderson
- TV announcers (CBS): Greg Gumbel, Phil Simms and Armen Keteyian
- Recap, Game Book

Game information

First quarter

- NE – Daniel Graham 27-yard pass from Tom Brady (Adam Vinatieri kick), 10:02. Patriots 7–0. Drive: 9 plays, 66 yards, 4:58.
- JAX – Seth Marler 24-yard field goal, 7:19. Patriots 7–3. Drive: 5 plays, 71 yards, 2:43.

Second quarter

- NE – Adam Vinatieri 22-yard field goal, 14:13. Patriots 10–3. Drive: 15 plays, 59 yards, 8:06.
- JAX – Seth Marler 23-yard field goal, 7:18. Patriots 10–6. Drive: 13 plays, 68 yards, 6:55.
- NE – Adam Vinatieri 31-yard field goal, 2:30. Patriots 13–6. Drive: 6 plays, 31 yards, 2:12.

Third quarter

- No scoring plays

Fourth quarter

- NE – Troy Brown 10-yard pass from Tom Brady (Adam Vinatieri kick), 10:57. Patriots 20–6. Drive: 8 plays, 35 yards, 3:52.
- NE – Antowain Smith 1-yard run (Adam Vinatieri kick), 4:18. Patriots 27–6. Drive: 3 plays, 3 yards, 1:27.
- JAX – Kevin Johnson 27-yard pass from Byron Leftwich (Seth Marler kick), 3:22. Patriots 27–13. Drive: 5 plays, 53 yards, 0:56.

Top passers

- JAX – Byron Leftwich – 21/40, 288 yards, TD, 2 INT
- NE – Tom Brady – 22/34, 228 yards, 2 TD

Top rushers

- JAX – Fred Taylor – 16 rushes, 57 yards
- NE – Antowain Smith – 17 rushes, 39 yards, TD

Top receivers

- JAX – Kevin Johnson – 5 receptions, 87 yards, TD
- NE – Daniel Graham – 5 receptions, 69 yards, TD

In a mild snowstorm, the Patriots faced the Jaguars for the first time since Jacksonville's 1998 playoff win over New England. The Patriots' defense allowed their first touchdown at home since week five when late in the fourth quarter Kevin Johnson caught a 27-yard touchdown pass from future Tom Brady offensive coach Byron Leftwich. The game was ultimately unaffected, as two Tom Brady touchdown throws, an Antowain Smith rushing score, and two Vinatieri field goals were enough for a 27–13 Patriots win.

==== Week 16: at New York Jets ====
Week 16: New England Patriots at New York Jets – Game summary

Quarter	1	2	3	4	Total
Patriots	7	7	7	0	21
Jets	7	3	0	6	16

at Giants Stadium, East Rutherford, New Jersey

- Game time: 8:30 p.m. EST
- Game weather: 30 °F (−1 °C), clear
- Game attendance: 77,835
- Referee: Walt Coleman
- TV announcers (ESPN): Mike Patrick, Joe Theismann, Paul Maguire and Suzy Kolber
- Recap, Game Book

Game information

First quarter

- NE – David Givens 35-yard pass from Tom Brady (Adam Vinatieri kick), 14:12. Patriots 7–0. Drive: 1 play, 35 yards, 0:08.
- NYJ – Chad Pennington 1-yard run (Doug Brien kick), 4:52. Tied 7–7. Drive: 16 play, 83 yards, 9:20.

Second quarter

- NE – Willie McGinest 15-yard interception return (Adam Vinatieri kick), 13:24. Patriots 14–7.
- NYJ – Doug Brien 29-yard field goal, 0:01. Patriots 14–10. Drive: 11 plays, 64 yards, 1:54.

Third quarter

- NE – David Givens 5-yard pass from Tom Brady (Adam Vinatieri kick), 10:53. Patriots 21–10. Drive: 7 play, 60 yards, 4:07.

Fourth quarter

- NYJ – Chad Pennington 10-yard run (pass failed), 12:11. Patriots 21–16. Drive: 12 play, 58 yards, 6:28.

Top passers

- NE – Tom Brady – 15/25, 138 yards, 2 TD
- NYJ – Chad Pennington – 24/43, 229 yards, 5 INT

Top rushers

- NE – Antowain Smith – 18 rushes, 121 yards
- NYJ – Curtis Martin – 22 rushes, 89 yards

Top receivers

- NE – David Givens – 4 receptions, 61 yards, 2 TD
- NYJ – Santana Moss – 5 receptions, 52 yards

In bitter cold the 12–2 Patriots faced a grinder against the 6–8 Jets, who were coming off a 6–0 shutout of Pittsburgh the week before; the Patriots were also facing Chad Pennington for the first time since a 30–17 Jets win in 2002. The Patriots picked off Pennington right away, setting up David Givens' 35-yard score not even one minute into the game. Pennington tied the game on a one-yard run late in the first quarter, but early in the second, he was picked off by Willie McGinest at his own 15 and McGinest scored. Givens caught another touchdown pass in the third quarter, but the score was only 21–16 after a second Pennington rushing score and a missed two-point try. Pennington was then picked off for the fifth time late in the fourth, finishing an ugly 21–16 Patriots win. The win moved New England to 13–2 before a rematch against the Bills in the season finale.

==== Week 17: vs. Buffalo Bills ====
Week 17: Buffalo Bills at New England Patriots – Game summary

Quarter	1	2	3	4	Total
Bills	0	0	0	0	0
Patriots	14	14	0	3	31

at Gillette Stadium, Foxborough, Massachusetts

- Game time: 1:30 p.m. EST
- Game weather: 42 °F (6 °C), sunny and windy
- Game attendance: 68,436
- Referee: Ron Winter
- TV announcers (CBS): Dick Enberg, Dan Dierdorf and Bonnie Bernstein
- Recap, Game Book

Game information

First quarter

- NE – Daniel Graham 1-yard pass from Tom Brady (Adam Vinatieri kick), 10:50. Patriots 7–0. Drive: 9 plays, 62 yards, 4:10.
- NE – Bethel Johnson 9-yard pass from Tom Brady (Adam Vinatieri kick), 5:23. Patriots 14–0. Drive: 8 plays, 34 yards, 3:54.

Second quarter

- NE – Troy Brown 19-yard pass from Tom Brady (Adam Vinatieri kick), 14:14. Patriots 21–0. Drive: 11 plays, 68 yards, 3:37.
- NE – David Givens 10-yard pass from Tom Brady (Adam Vinatieri kick), 3:55. Patriots 28–0. Drive: 9 play, 70 yards, 4:52.

Third quarter

- No scoring plays

Fourth quarter

- NE – Adam Vinatieri 24-yard field goal, 12:50. Patriots 31–0. Drive: 4 plays, 8 yards, 2:03.

Top passers

- BUF – Travis Brown – 11/14, 119 yards, INT
- NE – Tom Brady – 21/32, 204 yards, 4 TD

Top rushers

- BUF – Travis Henry – 15 rushes, 62 yards
- NE – Antowain Smith – 15 rushes, 74 yards

Top receivers

- BUF – Eric Moulds – 7 receptions, 55 yards
- NE – David Givens – 7 receptions, 80 yards, TD

The regular season finale saw the Patriots hosting the same Bills that blanked them 31–0 in September. Revenge drove the Patriots as Tom Brady threw four touchdowns, all in the first half, and despite an ugly hit in the legs by Lawyer Milloy in the second quarter. Adam Vinatieri missed a third-quarter field goal but connected from 24 yards out in the fourth. Drew Bledsoe never got on track and was pulled in the fourth quarter for Travis Brown, who got to the Patriots redzone at the end of the fourth quarter but was intercepted in the endzone by Larry Izzo. The Patriots' 31–0 win bookended the season.

=== Standings ===
==== Division ====
AFC East
	W	L	T	PCT	DIV	CONF	PF	PA	STK
^{(1)} New England Patriots	14	2	0	.875	5–1	11–1	348	238	W12
Miami Dolphins	10	6	0	.625	4–2	7–5	311	261	W2
Buffalo Bills	6	10	0	.375	2–4	4–8	243	279	L3
New York Jets	6	10	0	.375	1–5	6–6	283	299	L2

==== Standings breakdown ====
	W	L	T	Pct.	PF	PA
Home	8	0	0	1.000	169	68
Away	6	2	0	.750	179	170
AFC East Opponents	5	1	0	.833	106	76
AFC Opponents	11	1	0	.917	271	202
NFC Opponents	3	1	0	.750	77	36
By Stadium Type
Indoors	2	0	0	1.000	61	54
Outdoors	12	2	0	.857	287	184

== Postseason ==
=== Schedule ===
Round	Date	Opponent (seed)	Result	Record	Venue	NFL.com recap
Wild Card	Bye					
Divisional	January 10	Tennessee Titans (5)	W 17–14	1–0	Gillette Stadium	Recap
AFC Championship	January 18	Indianapolis Colts (3)	W 24–14	2–0	Gillette Stadium	Recap
Super Bowl XXXVIII	February 1	vs. Carolina Panthers (N3)	W 32–29	3–0	Reliant Stadium	Recap

=== Game summaries ===
==== Divisional Round vs. Tennessee Titans ====
AFC Divisional Playoffs: (5) Tennessee Titans at (1) New England Patriots – Game summary

Quarter	1	2	3	4	Total
Titans	7	0	7	0	14
Patriots	7	7	0	3	17

at Gillette Stadium, Foxborough, Massachusetts

- Game time: 8:00 p.m. EST
- Game weather: 4 °F (−16 °C), clear and very cold
- Game attendance: 68,436
- Referee: Bill Carollo
- TV announcers (CBS): Greg Gumbel, Phil Simms and Armen Keteyian
- Recap, Game Book

Game information

First quarter

- NE – Bethel Johnson 41-yard pass from Tom Brady (Adam Vinatieri kick), 10:59. Patriots 7–0. Drive: 6 plays, 69 yards, 2:52.
- TEN – Chris Brown 5-yard run (Gary Anderson kick), 7:31. Tied 7–7. Drive: 6 plays, 61 yards, 3:28.

Second quarter

- NE – Antowain Smith 1-yard run (Adam Vinatieri kick), 13:46. Patriots 14–7. Drive: 11 plays, 57 yards, 5:02.

Third quarter

- TEN – Derrick Mason 11-yard pass from Steve McNair (Gary Anderson kick), 4:14. Tied 14–14. Drive: 11 plays, 70 yards, 7:47.

Fourth quarter

- NE – Adam Vinatieri 46-yard field goal, 4:06. Patriots 17–14. Drive: 8 plays, 13 yards, 2:34.

Top passers

- TEN – Steve McNair – 18/26, 210 yards, TD, INT
- NE – Tom Brady – 21/41, 201 yards, TD

Top rushers

- TEN – Eddie George – 16 rushes, 48 yards
- NE – Antowain Smith – 16 rushes, 69 yards, TD

Top receivers

- TEN – Derrick Mason – 7 receptions, 90 yards, TD
- NE – Bethel Johnson – 2 receptions, 55 yards, TD

In one of the coldest games in NFL history, with temperatures reaching 4 °F (−16 °C), the Patriots survived both the cold and NFL co-MVP Steve McNair, relying on yet another game-winning field goal from kicker Adam Vinatieri late in the fourth quarter and a key defensive stand.

Tom Brady stormed out of the gate with a 19-yard completion to Kevin Faulk on his first pass attempt. A few plays later, the Titans defensive scheme confused him, requiring him to use a timeout, but on the next play he threw a 41-yard touchdown pass to Bethel Johnson. McNair struck back with a 15-yard completion to Derrick Mason and a 24-yard pass to running back Eddie George, moving the ball to the Patriots' 22-yard line. Roman Phifer almost ended the drive by intercepting a pass from McNair, but lineman Richard Seymour was penalized for roughing the passer and the Titans got the ball back with a first down on the New England 9-yard line. Two plays later, Chris Brown scored a 5-yard touchdown run to tie the game.

After the ensuing kickoff, Brady completed two passes to Dedric Ward for 30 yards on a 38-yard drive to the Titans' 26-yard line. The drive ended with no points when Vinatieri missed a 44-yard field goal attempt, but on the next play safety Rodney Harrison intercepted a pass from McNair and returned it 7 yards to the Patriot's 43-yard line. Brady subsequently completed four of six passes for 49 yards and rushed for 3 on the way to a 1-yard touchdown run by Antowain Smith to retake the lead less than two minutes into the second quarter. Later in the period, the Titans drove 51 yards in nine plays to the Patriot's 13-yard line, including a 29-yard completion from McNair to Mason, but New England's defense kept them out of the end zone and blocked Gary Anderson's 31-yard field goal attempt.

Early in the third quarter, McNair led the Titans on a 70-yard scoring drive, completing 5 consecutive passes for 59 yards and capping it off with an 11-yard touchdown pass to Mason. The rest of the third quarter was scoreless, but midway through the fourth quarter Troy Brown's 10-yard punt return gave the Patriots great field position at the Titans' 40-yard line. The Patriots gained only 13 yards on their ensuing possession, but it was enough for Vinatieri to make a 46-yard field goal, giving New England a 17–14 lead with 4:02 left in regulation.

The Titans took the ensuing kickoff and drove to the Patriots 33-yard line, but two penalties, a 10-yard intentional grounding call, and a holding penalty, pushed them back 20 yards. McNair threw an 11-yard completion on the next play, but then Drew Bennett dropped a potential first down catch on fourth down and 12, and the Titans turned the ball over on downs with 1:38 left.

The win was the 325th win in Patriots history.

==== AFC Championship vs. Indianapolis Colts ====
AFC Championship: (3) Indianapolis Colts at (1) New England Patriots – Game summary

Quarter	1	2	3	4	Total
Colts	0	0	7	7	14
Patriots	7	8	6	3	24

at Gillette Stadium, Foxborough, Massachusetts

- Game time: 3:00 p.m. EST
- Game weather: 32 °F (0 °C), cloudy, occasional snow
- Game attendance: 68,436
- Referee: Walt Coleman
- TV announcers (CBS): Greg Gumbel, Phil Simms, Armen Keteyian and Bonnie Bernstein
- Recap, Game Book

Game information

First quarter

- NE – David Givens 7-yard pass from Tom Brady (Adam Vinatieri kick), 8:16. Patriots 7–0. Drive: 13 plays, 65 yards, 6:44.

Second quarter

- NE – Adam Vinatieri 31-yard field goal, 12:44. Patriots 10–0. Drive: 13 plays, 67 yards, 5:42.
- NE – Adam Vinatieri 25-yard field goal, 8:06. Patriots 13–0. Drive: 11 plays, 52 yards, 4:22.
- NE – Justin Snow fumble out of bounds in the end zone for a safety, 4:08. Patriots 15–0

Third quarter

- IND – Edgerrin James 2-yard run (Mike Vanderjagt kick), 9:44. Patriots 15–7. Drive: 12 plays, 52 yards, 5:16.
- NE – Adam Vinatieri 27-yard field goal, 7:20. Patriots 18–7. Drive: 6 plays, 48 yards, 2:24.
- NE – Adam Vinatieri 21-yard field goal, 1:32. Patriots 21–7. Drive: 8 plays, 66 yards, 4:45.

Fourth quarter

- IND – Marcus Pollard 7-yard pass from Peyton Manning (Mike Vanderjagt kick), 2:27. Patriots 21–14. Drive: 13 plays, 67 yards, 3:43.
- NE – Adam Vinatieri 34-yard field goal, 0:50. Patriots 24–14. Drive: 4 plays, 4 yards, 0:51.

Top passers

- IND – Peyton Manning – 23/47, 237 yards, TD, 4 INT
- NE – Tom Brady – 22/37, 237 yards, TD, INT

Top rushers

- IND – Edgerrin James – 19 rushes, 78 yards, TD
- NE – Antowain Smith – 22 rushes, 100 yards

Top receivers

- IND – Marcus Pollard – 6 receptions, 90 yards, TD
- NE – Troy Brown – 7 receptions, 88 yards

New England's defense dominated the Colts, only allowing 14 points, intercepting 4 passes from Peyton Manning (3 of them by Ty Law), recording 4 sacks (three by Jarvis Green), and forcing a safety. Although New England's offense fared no better and only scored one touchdown, Vinatieri's 5 field goals made up for the difference as the Patriots won, 24–14, to advance to their second Super Bowl appearance in 3 seasons.

The Patriots took the opening kickoff and scored on their first drive, advancing the ball 65 yards in 13 plays. Tom Brady completed four passes to receiver David Givens for 40 yards on the drive, including a 7-yard touchdown pass, and converted a fourth down on his own 44-yard line with a 2-yard run. Manning seemed ready to counter, driving the Colts 68 yards to the Patriots' 5-yard line, but on third down and 3, his pass was intercepted by Rodney Harrison in the end zone. After the interception, the Patriots drove 67 yards to the Colts' 13-yard line where Vinatieri's 31-yard field goal increased their lead to 10–0.

The Patriots' defense continued to dominate the Colts in the second quarter. On the first play after the ensuing kickoff, Law intercepted a pass from Manning and returned it 6 yards to the 41-yard line. The Patriots then drove 52 yards and increased their lead to 13–0 with a second Vinatieri field goal. Brady completed three passes for 42 yards on the drive, including a 17-yarder to Givens and a 16-yard completion to Troy Brown on fourth down and 8. For the first time in the entire postseason, the Colts were forced to punt on their next drive, and the snap from center Justin Snow sailed over the head of punter Hunter Smith. The ball went into the end zone where Smith was forced to knock it out of bounds for a safety, making the score 15–0.

The Colts had a great opportunity to score when rookie defense back David Macklin recovered a fumble from receiver Bethel Johnson three plays after the free kick, giving Indianapolis a first down on the Patriot's 41-yard line. However, five plays later, Harrison forced a fumble while tackling Marvin Harrison and cornerback Tyrone Poole recovered it.

Trailing 15–0 at halftime, the Colts finally managed to build some momentum in the third quarter. Dominic Rhodes gave them great field position by returning the second-half kickoff 35 yards to the 49-yard line. Running back Edgerrin James spearheaded a 52-yard scoring drive, carrying the ball on 7 of 12 plays for 32 yards and capping it off with a 2-yard touchdown run to cut the score to 15–7, but the Patriots took over the rest of the period. After Patrick Pass returned the ensuing kickoff 21 yards to the 43-yard line, Brady completed passes to Larry Centers for 28 yards, Brown for 17, and Kevin Faulk for 8, setting up Vinatieri's third field goal to increase their lead to 18–7. Three plays after the ensuing kickoff, Indianapolis was forced to punt. Antowain Smith then rushed four times for 53 yards on New England's next possession, advancing the ball to the Colts' 3-yard line where Vinatieri kicked his fourth field goal. Two plays after the ensuing kickoff, Law recorded his second interception from Manning on the Colts' 31-yard line. But this time, the Patriots failed to score because defensive back Walt Harris picked off a pass from Brady in the end zone.

After the turnover, the Colts drove 57 yards to the New England 31-yard line. But then Manning threw his third interception to Law with 8:17 left in the fourth quarter. After forcing a punt, Manning led the Colts back, completing 8 of 9 passes for 64 yards and finishing the drive with a 7-yard touchdown pass to Marcus Pollard with 2:22 left in regulation. The Colts failed to recover their ensuing onside kick attempt, but forced a punt with 2:01 left. However, the Patriots' defense limited Manning to four consecutive incompletions, causing the Colts to turn the ball over on downs. Then, after Indianapolis used up all of their timeouts, Vinatieri's 5th field goal increased the Patriot's lead to 24–14. The Colts attempted one last desperation drive, but ended up turning the ball over on downs again with 7 seconds left in the game. The Patriots would go on to win 24–14 and advance to their second Super Bowl in three years.

Brady completed 22 of 37 passes for 237 yards and a touchdown, with 1 interception. Smith rushed for 100 yards. Pollard caught 6 passes for 90 yards and a touchdown. Rhodes returned five kickoffs for 121 yards, rushed for 16, and caught 2 passes for 17.

Colts players would later publicly complain that the game officials did not properly call illegal contact, pass interference, and defensive holding penalties on the Patriots' defensive backs. This, and similar complaints made by others, would prompt the NFL during the 2004 offseason to instruct all of the league's officials to strictly enforce these types of fouls.

==== Super Bowl XXXVIII vs. Carolina Panthers ====
Super Bowl XXXVIII: (N3) Carolina Panthers vs. (A1) New England Patriots – Game summary

Quarter	1	2	3	4	Total
Panthers	0	10	0	19	29
Patriots	0	14	0	18	32

at Reliant Stadium, Houston, Texas

- Game time: 6:25 p.m. EST
- Game weather: Played with roof closed, retractable roof stadium
- Game attendance: 71,525
- Referee: Ed Hochuli
- TV announcers (CBS): Greg Gumbel, Phil Simms, Armen Keteyian and Bonnie Bernstein
- Recap, Game Book

Game information

First quarter

- No scoring plays

Second quarter

- NE – Deion Branch 5-yard pass from Tom Brady (Adam Vinatieri kick), 3:05. Patriots 7–0. Drive: 4 plays, 20 yards, 2:10.
- CAR – Steve Smith 39-yard pass from Jake Delhomme (John Kasay kick), 1:07. Tied 7–7. Drive: 8 plays, 95 yards, 1:58.
- NE – David Givens 5-yard pass from Tom Brady (Adam Vinatieri kick), 0:18. Patriots 14–7. Drive: 6 plays, 78 yards, 0:49.
- CAR – John Kasay 50-yard field goal, 0:00. Patriots 14–10. Drive: 2 plays, 21 yards, 0:18.

Third quarter

- No scoring plays

Fourth quarter

- NE – Antowain Smith 2-yard run (Adam Vinatieri kick), 14:49. Patriots 21–10. Drive: 8 plays, 71 yards, 4:08.
- CAR – DeShaun Foster 33-yard run (pass failed), 12:39. Patriots 21–16. Drive: 6 plays, 81 yards, 2:10.
- CAR – Muhsin Muhammad 85-yard pass from Jake Delhomme (pass failed), 6:53. Panthers 22–21. Drive: 3 plays, 90 yards, 0:45.
- NE – Mike Vrabel 1-yard pass from Tom Brady (Kevin Faulk run), 2:51. Patriots 29–22. Drive: 11 plays, 68 yards, 4:02.
- CAR – Ricky Proehl 12-yard pass from Jake Delhomme (John Kasay kick), 1:08. Tied 29–29. Drive: 7 plays, 80 yards, 1:43.
- NE – Adam Vinatieri 41-yard field goal, 0:04. Patriots 32–29. Drive: 6 plays, 37 yards, 1:04.

Top passers

- CAR – Jake Delhomme – 16/33, 323 yards, 3 TD
- NE – Tom Brady – 32/48, 354 yards, 3 TD, INT

Top rushers

- CAR – Stephen Davis – 13 rushes, 49 yards
- NE – Antowain Smith – 26 rushes, 83 yards, TD

Top receivers

- CAR – Muhsin Muhammad – 4 receptions, 140 yards, TD
- NE – Deion Branch – 10 receptions, 143 yards, TD

Most of the first half was a defensive struggle, with neither team able to score until late in the second quarter, despite several early scoring opportunities for New England. After Carolina was forced to punt on their opening drive, Patriots receiver Troy Brown gave his team great field position with a 28-yard return to the Panther's 47-yard line. The Patriots subsequently marched to the 9-yard line, but Carolina kept them out of the end zone and Adam Vinatieri missed a 31-yard field goal attempt. The Patriots forced Carolina to punt after 3 plays and again got the ball with great field position, receiving Todd Sauerbrun's 40-yard punt at the Panther's 49-yard line. New England then drove to the 31-yard line, but on third down linebacker Will Witherspoon tackled Brown for a 10-yard loss on an end-around play, pushing the Patriots out of field goal range. Later on, New England drove 57 yards to the Panthers' 18-yard line with 6 minutes left in the second period, but once again they failed to score as Carolina kept them out of the end zone and Vinatieri's 36-yard field goal attempt was blocked by Panthers defender Shane Burton.

Meanwhile, the Panthers' offense was stymied by the Patriot defense, with quarterback Jake Delhomme completing just one out of his first nine passes, being sacked three times, and fumbling once. That fumble occurred 3 plays after Vinatieri's second missed field goal; Delhomme lost the ball while being sacked by linebacker Mike Vrabel, and Patriots defensive tackle Richard Seymour recovered the ball at the Panthers' 20-yard line. Two plays later, New England faced a third down and 7, but quarterback Tom Brady scrambled 12 yards to the 5-yard line for a first down. Wide receiver Deion Branch caught a 5-yard touchdown pass from Brady on the next play.

Branch's touchdown came after 26:55 had elapsed in the game, setting the record for the longest amount of time a Super Bowl remained scoreless. The play then set off a scoring explosion from both teams for the remainder of the first half.

The Panthers stormed down the field on their ensuing possession, driving 95 yards in 8 plays, and tying the game on a 39-yard touchdown pass from Delhomme to wide receiver Steve Smith with just 1:07 left in the half.

The Patriots immediately countered with a 6-play, 78-yard scoring drive of their own. Starting from their own 22-yard line, Brady completed a 12-yard pass to wide receiver David Givens. Then after throwing an incompletion, Brady completed a long pass to Branch, who caught it at the Panthers' 24-yard line in stride before being tackled at the 14-yard line for a 52-yard gain. Three plays later, Givens caught a 5-yard touchdown from Brady to give New England a 14–7 lead with only 18 seconds left in the half. The Patriots decided to squib kick the ensuing kickoff to prevent a long return, but their plan backfired as Carolina tight end Kris Mangum picked up the ball at his own 35-yard line and returned it 12 yards to the 47. Panthers running back Stephen Davis then ran for 21 yards on the next play to set up kicker John Kasay's 50-yard field goal as time expired in the half, cutting Carolina's deficit to 14–10.

The third quarter was scoreless as each team exchanged punts twice. But with 3:57 left in the period, the Patriots put together a 71-yard, 8-play scoring drive, featuring tight end Daniel Graham's 33-yard reception to advance to the Carolina 9-yard line. Running back Antowain Smith then capped off the drive with a 2-yard touchdown run on the second play in the final period to increase their lead to 21–10. This was the start of another scoring explosion, one that became one of the biggest explosions in Super Bowl history, with both teams scoring a combined 37 points in the last 15 minutes, the most ever in a single quarter of a Super Bowl.

Delhomme started out Carolina's ensuing drive with a 13-yard completion to wide receiver Muhsin Muhammad. After committing a false start penalty on the next play, Delhomme completed a pair of passes to Smith for gains of 18 and 22 yards. Running back DeShaun Foster then scored on a 33-yard touchdown run, cutting the Panthers' deficit to 21–16 after Delhomme's 2-point conversion pass fell incomplete. The Patriots responded on their ensuing possession by driving all the way to Carolina's 9-yard line, but the drive ended when Panthers defensive back Reggie Howard intercepted a third-down pass from Brady in the end zone. Then on 3rd down from his own 15-yard line, Delhomme threw for the longest play from scrimmage in Super Bowl history, an 85-yard touchdown completion to Muhammad. Carolina's 2-point conversion attempt failed again, but they took their first lead of the game, 22–21, with 6:53 remaining.

However, New England retook the lead on their next drive, advancing 68 yards with the aid of a pair of completions from Brady to Givens for gains of 18 and 25 yards. Once again the Patriots were faced with third down and goal, but this time they scored with Brady's 1-yard pass to Vrabel, who had lined up in an eligible tight end position. Then on a two-point conversion attempt, running back Kevin Faulk took a direct snap and ran into the end zone to make the score 29–22. Despite amassing over 1,000 combined yards, Kevin Faulk's two-point conversion constituted the only points he scored all season.

The Panthers countered on their next possession. Foster started the drive with a 9-yard run and a 7-yard reception. After that, Delhomme completed a 19-yard pass to Muhammad, followed by a 31-yard completion to receiver Ricky Proehl. Then Proehl, who caught the fourth quarter game-tying touchdown pass against the Patriots in Super Bowl XXXVI 2 years earlier for the St. Louis Rams, finished the drive with a 12-yard touchdown reception. Kasay's ensuing extra point tied the game, 29–29, with 1:08 to play in regulation and it appeared that the game would be the first Super Bowl ever to go into overtime.

However, Kasay kicked the ensuing kickoff out of bounds, giving New England the ball on their own 40-yard line. Brady calmly led the Patriots' offense down the field with a 13-yard pass to Brown on second down. An offensive pass interference penalty on Brown pushed New England back to their own 43-yard line, but another 13-yard reception to Brown and a 4-yard pass to Graham brought up a critical 3rd down and 3 from the Carolina 40-yard line. The Panthers' defense could not prevent the Patriots from gaining the first down, as Brady completed a 17-yard pass to Branch. On the next play, Vinatieri kicked a 41-yard field goal to give New England the lead, 32–29, with four seconds left in the game. Carolina failed on their last chance, as Rod Smart went nowhere on the resulting kickoff, and the Patriots had won their second Super Bowl in three years. This was the fourth Super Bowl to be decided on a field goal in the final seconds. Super Bowl V was won on a last-second kick by Jim O'Brien, Super Bowl XXV as Scott Norwood missed his field goal chance, and Super Bowl XXXVI as Adam Vinatieri made his.

== Awards and honors ==
Recipient	Award(s)
Joe Andruzzi	2003 New England Patriots Ron Burton Community Service Award
Bill Belichick	2003 Associated Press NFL Coach of the Year
Tom Brady	Super Bowl XXXVIII MVP; Week 9: FedEx Express NFL Player of the Week; Week 17: FedEx Express NFL Player of the Week
Dan Klecko	2003 New England Patriots 12th Player Award
Willie McGinest	Week 16: AFC Defensive Player of the Week
Asante Samuel	Week 3: Pepsi NFL Rookie of the Week
Richard Seymour	Week 7: AFC Special Teams Player of the Week; Divisional Playoffs: AFC Special Teams Player of the Week
Mike Vrabel	2003 New England Patriots Ed Block Courage Award

=== Pro Bowl selections ===
Three Patriots were elected to the 2004 Pro Bowl. Cornerback Ty Law and defensive lineman Richard Seymour were both named as starters, while linebacker Willie McGinest was named as a reserve, replacing the injured Peter Boulware.
