= Kirk Herbstreit =

American football player and analyst

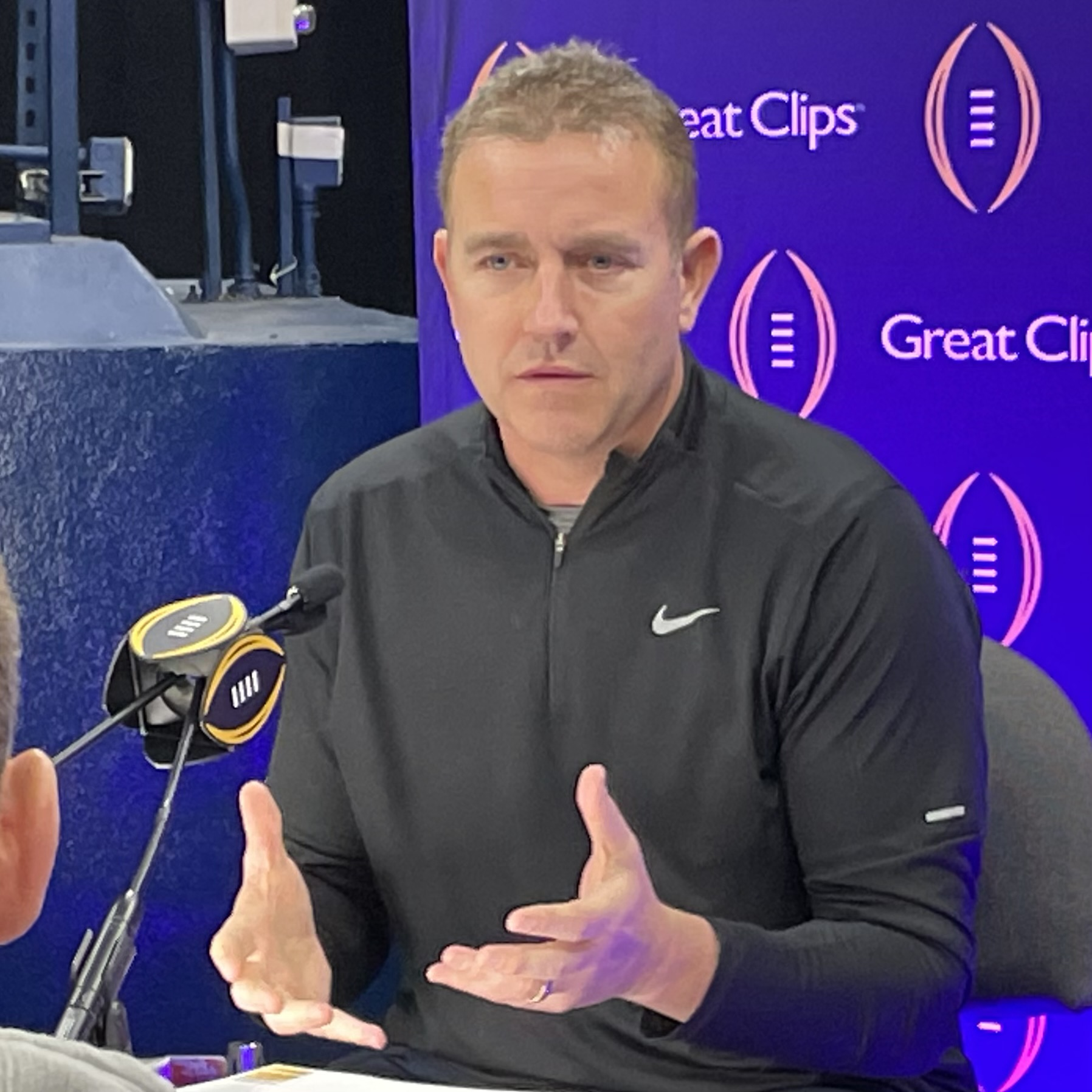
- Herbstreit in 2024
- Born: Kirk Edward Herbstreit; August 19, 1969 (age 57); Hamilton, Ohio, U.S.
- Education: Ohio State University (BS)
- Years active: 1995–present
- Sports commentary career
- Genre: Color commentary
- Sports: College football; National Football League
- Employer: ESPN (including ABC), Amazon Prime Video
- Football career

Profile
- Position: Quarterback

Personal information
- Listed height: 6 ft 2 in (1.88 m)

Career information
- High school: Centerville (Centerville, Ohio)
- College: Ohio State (1989–1993)

Kirk Edward Herbstreit (/ˈhɜːrbstriːt/; born August 19, 1969) is an American sportscaster and former college football player. He serves as an analyst for ESPN's College GameDay, a television program covering college football, and provides color commentary on college football games on ESPN and ABC and Thursday night National Football League (NFL) games on Prime Video. He previously served as an analyst on select Monday Night NFL games with ESPN.

For his TV work, Herbstreit has won five Sports Emmy Awards in various categories. He appeared has as a commentator in EA Sports' College Football video game series, including after a ten-year hiatus.

From 1989 to 1993, Herbstreit played football as a quarterback for the Ohio State Buckeyes. He played in several games his junior season, and he was the starting quarterback throughout his senior season.

== Early life and playing career ==
Herbstreit graduated from Centerville High School in Centerville, Ohio, a suburb of Dayton. As a quarterback for the Elks, he was the Ohio Gatorade Player of the Year as a senior. He also was a standout basketball and baseball player.

Herbstreit was the first player to commit to the Ohio State Buckeyes after the hiring of John Cooper as head coach in 1988. Herbstreit was a four-year letterman as a quarterback at Ohio State University from 1989 to 1993. After waiting his turn behind Greg Frey and Kent Graham, Herbstreit finally led the team as a senior in 1992. That year, he was a co-captain (along with linebacker Steve Tovar) and voted team MVP. Herbstreit passed for 1,904 yards that season, including four 200-plus-yard games, before losing to the Georgia Bulldogs in the Florida Citrus Bowl. Herbstreit set the Ohio State record for pass completions (28) in the rivalry game against the Michigan Wolverines, throwing for 271 yards in a 13–13 tie in 1992. The record stood until 2006, when it was broken by Heisman Trophy winner Troy Smith. Herbstreit graduated from Ohio State in 1993 with a degree in business administration.

Herbstreit's father, Jim Herbstreit, was a co-captain (along with offensive tackle Jim Tyrer) of the 1960 Ohio State team, and later an assistant coach at Ohio State under Woody Hayes. When Herbstreit was named co-captain in 1992, the two became only the second father-and-son duo to have each been Ohio State captains. (James and Jeff Davidson were the first in 1989; Pepper and Dionte Johnson became the third in 2007.)

== Broadcasting career ==
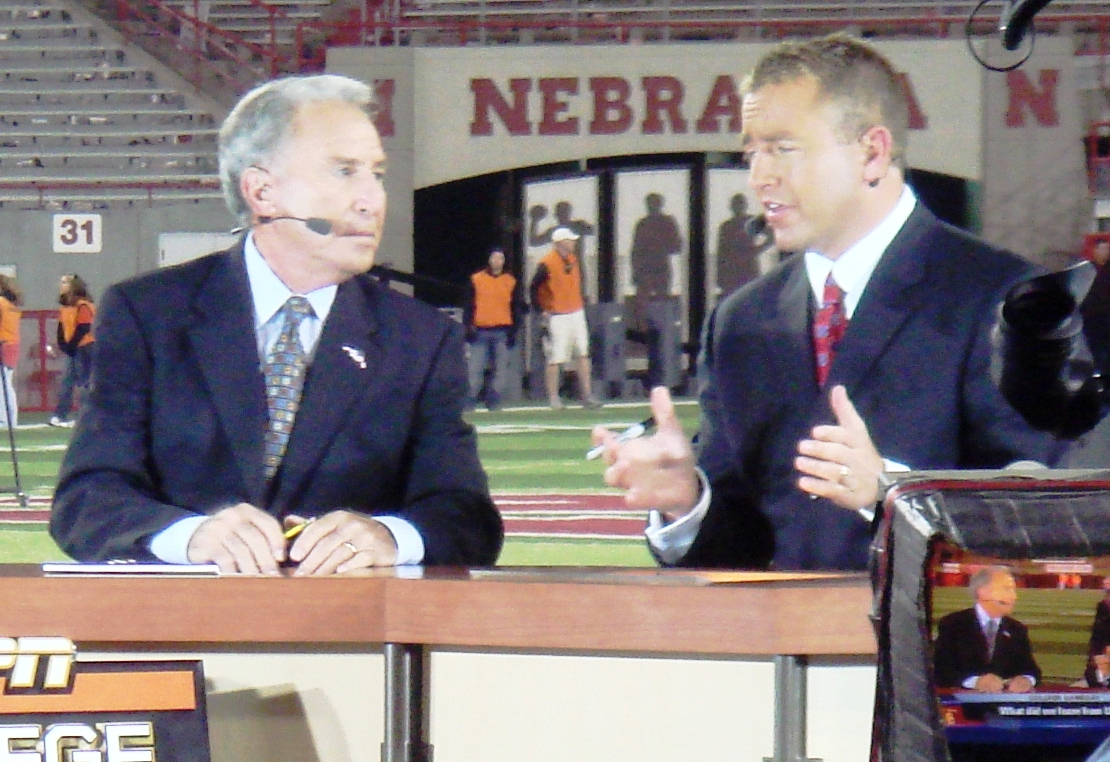
Lee Corso and Herbstreit discuss college football on an evening update of College Gameday in 2007

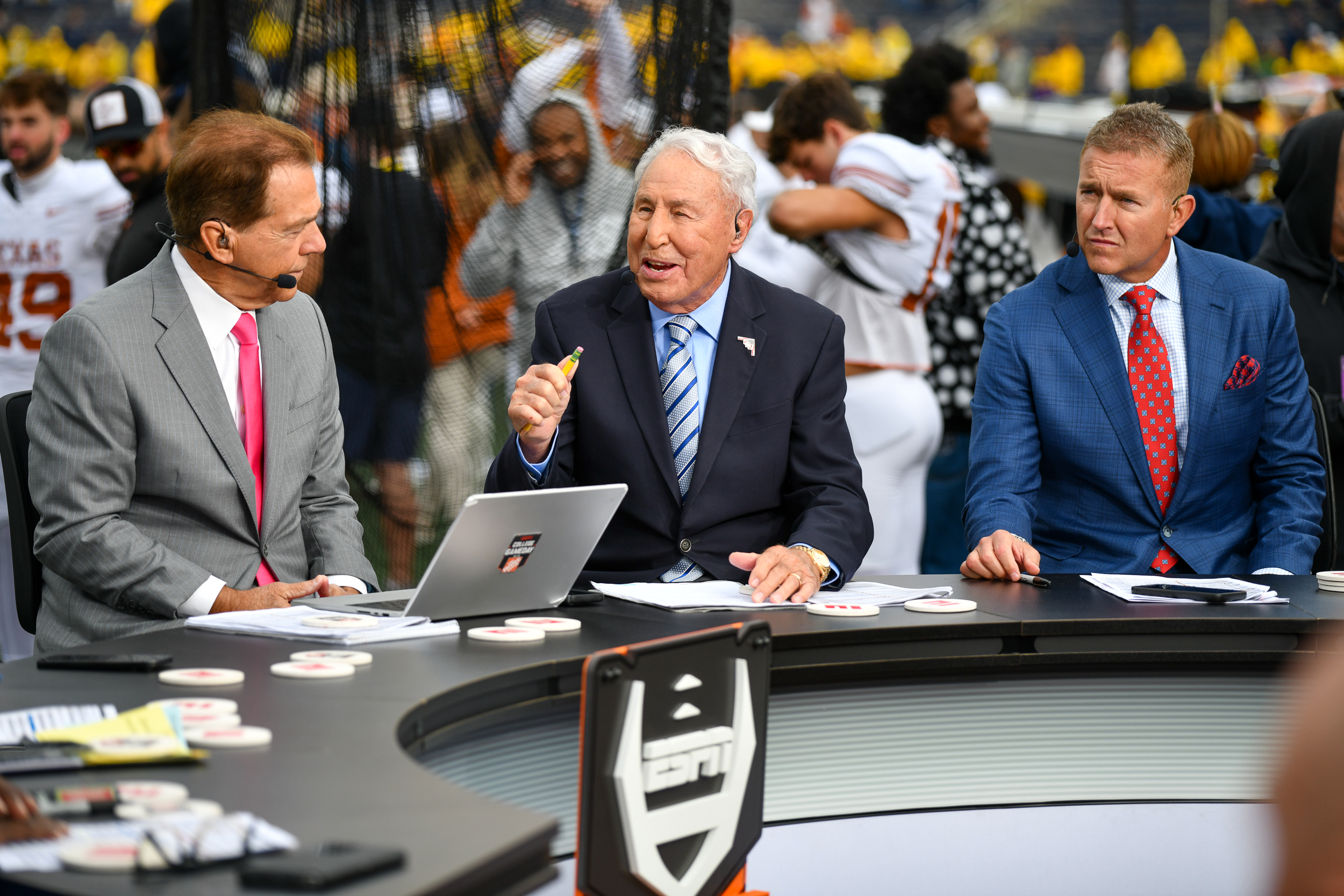
Nick Saban, Corso and Herbstreit during a broadcast of College GameDay in 2024

Herbstreit joined ESPN in September 1995 as a college football sideline analyst. The following year, he joined College GameDay as a lead analyst. He continues to serve in that role alongside host Rece Davis and fellow analysts Desmond Howard, Pat McAfee and Nick Saban. He also serves as the lead game analyst for ESPN and ABC, a responsibility that sees him travel to ESPN's biggest game that week for ABC Saturday Night Football to call the marquee game alongside former GameDay host and longtime colleague Chris Fowler and sideline reporter Holly Rowe.

Herbstreit was nominated for a 1997 Sports Emmy Award as television's top studio analyst and wrote a weekly in-season column, "Inside The Game With Kirk Herbstreit", for The Sporting News.

A frequent contributor to ESPN.com and ESPN The Magazine, Herbstreit has worked as a color commentator for ESPN's Thursday night college football games.

In July 2007, Herbstreit served as a panelist for the series Who's Now alongside Keyshawn Johnson and Michael Wilbon. Herbstreit contributes to the 97.1 The Fan, an ESPN Radio affiliate out of Columbus, Ohio.

In 2018, Herbstreit was announced to replace Jon Gruden for night one of ESPN's NFL draft coverage, as Gruden left to return to the Oakland Raiders. When ABC picked up rights to air the first two nights of the Draft, Herbstreit moved to ABC's coverage with his GameDay colleagues.

In 2020, Herbstreit announced the first game of the Monday Night Football Kickoff Week doubleheader alongside Fowler. A week later, Herbstreit and Davis worked a special Monday Night Football MegaCast on ESPN2 for the Saints–Raiders game, the first ever NFL game to be played in Las Vegas, on the night in which Monday Night Football celebrated its 50th anniversary. In 2022, Fowler and Herbstreit again called the first game of an MNF doubleheader, this time during the final week of the 2021 season.

On March 23, 2022, Herbstreit was announced as the new color commentator for Thursday Night Football on Prime Video, alongside NFL play-by-play announcer Al Michaels. That same day, Herbstreit agreed to an extension of his contract with ESPN to allow him to continue on GameDay, Saturday Night Football, and the NFL Draft, to go along with his new NFL duties for Amazon.

=== NCAA Football and EA Sports College Football voice acting ===
Herbstreit provided in-game voice commentary for Electronic Arts's college football games, including thirteen installments released prior to the series' pause after NCAA Football 14. He provided voice acting for the series' return with EA Sports College Football 25, including over 115 hours of voice acting between Herbstreit and Chris Fowler. Herbstreit returned for EA Sports College Football 26, but was replaced by Joel Klatt in EA Sports College Football 27.

== Personal life ==
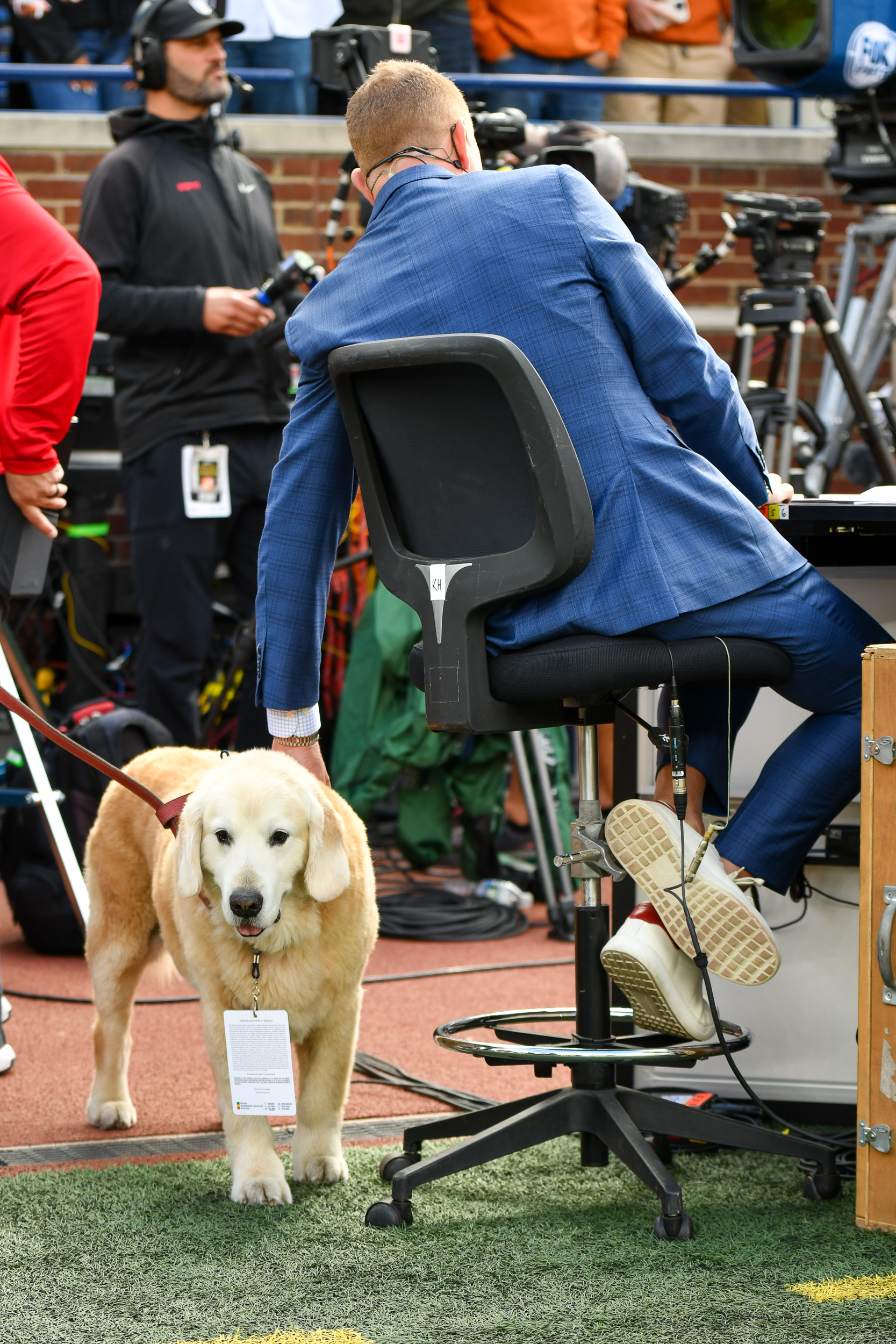
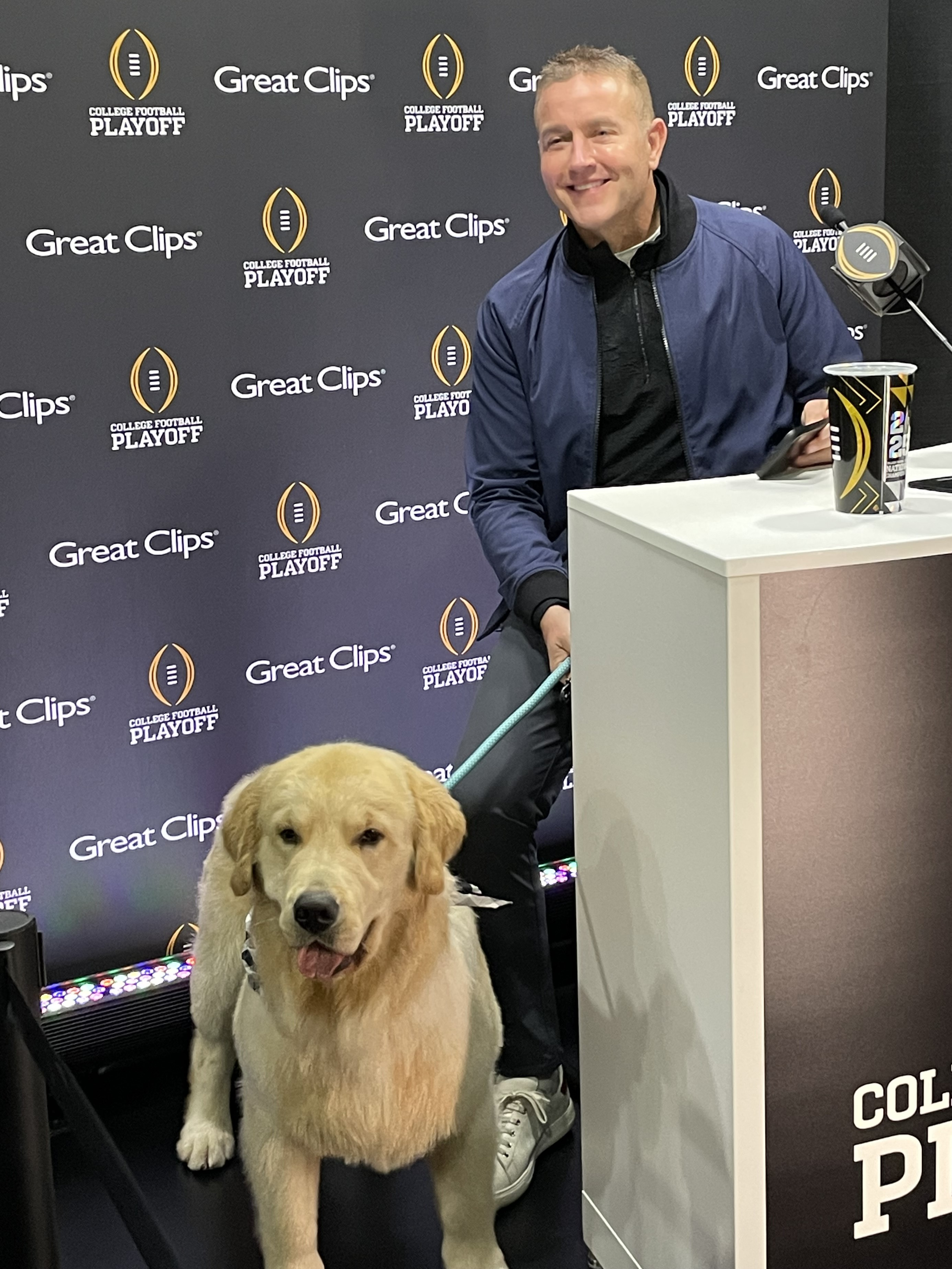
Herbstreit pets his dog Ben during a College GameDay commercial break, 2024 (left); Herbstreit and his dog Peter talking to press ahead of the 2025 CFP National Championship (right).

Herbstreit met his wife Alison at Ohio State, where she was a cheerleader. They were married in 1998 and have four sons. The Herbstreits moved from Ohio to Nashville in 2011, but split time between there and Cincinnati, where their youngest son played quarterback for St. Xavier High School. His twin sons, Jake and Tye, were athletes at Montgomery Bell Academy. Tye played football as a walk-on for the Clemson Tigers; Jake walked on at Clemson, before transferring to Ohio State to focus on academics. His middle son, Zak, joined the Ohio State Buckeyes as a preferred walk-on in 2021. His youngest son, Chase, is a member of the Michigan Wolverines.

Herbstreit is a Christian. When asked about the role faith plays in his life, he said, "Everything. I try to every day walk that path."

Herbstreit is a fan of the Cincinnati Reds and Cincinnati Bengals.

He has four golden retrievers, one of whom, Ben, traveled with him to games. Ben, who was a certified emotional support animal, was considered a "fan favorite" until his death in November 2024 due to leukemia. President Joe Biden sent Herbstreit a letter offering his condolences. Following Ben's passing, Ben's younger brother Peter started to travel with Herbstreit and began appearing on Thursday Night Football and College GameDay.

Herbstreit sued the IRS in 2009 for changing an implied policy of allowing deductions for house donations to the fire department for training purposes.

Herbstreit has been involved in multiple charities, including the Buckeye Cruise for Cancer and the Make-A-Wish Foundation.

He previously lent his name to the "Kirk Herbstreit National Kickoff Classic" in Columbus, Ohio, and Arlington, Texas, a matchup between high school football teams from Ohio and Texas. The series began in 2005, and ended in 2012 due to a lack of sponsorship.

== Career statistics ==
=== College ===
Year	Team	Games			Passing								Rushing			
Year	Team	GP	GS	Record	Cmp	Att	Pct	Yds	Y/A	TD	Int	Rtg	Att	Yds	Avg	TD
1988	Ohio State	0	0	—	Redshirted (redshirt)											
1989	Ohio State	6	0	—	4	9	44.4	48	5.3	0	1	67.0	10	6	0.6	0
1990	Ohio State	10	0	—	0	1	0.0	0	0.0	0	1	−200.0	1	10	10.0	0
1991	Ohio State	12	2	1–1	24	43	55.8	311	7.2	1	3	110.3	23	183	8.0	2
1992	Ohio State	12	12	8–3–1	155	264	58.7	1,904	7.2	4	6	119.7	67	−30	0.4	2
Career		40	14	9–4–1	183	317	57.7	2,263	7.1	5	11	116.0	101	169	1.7	2

== Awards and honors ==
- Five-time Sports Emmy Award winner
  - Three Outstanding Studio Analyst (2010, 2011, 2019)
  - Two Outstanding Event Analyst (2018, 2020)
- Rose Bowl Hall of Fame (inducted 2023)
