= Gene Mruczkowski =

American football player (born 1980)

No. 64, 63, 62
- Position: Guard

Personal information
- Born: June 6, 1980 (age 46); Cleveland, Ohio, U.S.
- Listed height: 6 ft 2 in (1.88 m)
- Listed weight: 305 lb (138 kg)

Career information
- College: Purdue
- NFL draft: 2003: undrafted

Career history
- New England Patriots (2003–2006); Miami Dolphins (2007); New England Patriots (2008)*; Florida Tuskers (2009)
- * Offseason or practice squad member only

Awards and highlights
- 2× Super Bowl champion (XXXVIII, XXXIX)

Career NFL statistics
- Games played: 33
- Stats at Pro Football Reference

Gene Vincent Mruczkowski (born June 6, 1980) is an American former professional football player who was a guard in the National Football League (NFL). He played college football for the Purdue Boilermakers and was signed by the New England Patriots as an undrafted free agent in 2003.

Mruczkowski, who also played for the Miami Dolphins, earned Super Bowl rings with the Patriots in Super Bowl XXXVIII and Super Bowl XXXIX. He is the older brother of NFL offensive lineman Scott Mruczkowski. Over the years, Mruczkowski has become a successful business owner.

== Early life ==
Mruczkowski was named second-team Academic All-American as a senior and sophomore in high school, as well as second-team all-state, first-team all-district, and team co-captain as a senior at Benedictine High School. He also played defensive tackle as his team finished with a 10–1 record and advanced to the state semifinal.

== College career ==
Mruczkowski started attending Purdue University in 1998. That year, he was redshirted and did not play, but received the team's Offensive Newcomer Award for the spring season. As a freshman, he started all 12 games at left guard and was selected second-team Freshman All-American by The Sporting News. He was selected honorable mention All-Big Ten by both the coaches and media as a sophomore after starting all 12 games at left guard, which was part of an offensive line that allowed Purdue quarterbacks to be sacked just 10 times in 528 pass attempts (one every 52.8 attempts). In 2001, he started all 12 games at center after moving from left guard during spring practice. He received the team's Pit Bull award for exemplifying tenacity and intense play during the 2002 spring season. As a senior in 2002, he was named honorable mention All-Big Ten by the media after starting all 13 games at center and helped open holes for a Boilermaker rushing attack that amassed 2,861 yards and 26 touchdowns on the ground. He started all 49 games in his four-year stay at Purdue.

== Professional career ==
=== First stint with Patriots ===
Mruczkowski was picked up as a free agent by the New England Patriots in 2003. He was placed on the Patriots reserve/non-football injury list with a leg injury before the beginning of the season. He was subsequently placed on injured reserve and did not play in his rookie season. He then played 17 games total for the 2004 and 2005 season. He was released by the Patriots on September 1, 2007.

=== Miami Dolphins ===
Mruczkowski was claimed off waivers by the Miami Dolphins the day after his release from the Patriots. He appeared in 15 games for the Dolphins in a reserve role during the 2007 season. He became a free agent at season's end.

=== Second stint with Patriots ===
On June 6, 2008, Mruczkowski was re-signed by the Patriots.

=== First retirement ===
On July 26, 2008, Mruczkowski retired from the football after five seasons.

=== Florida Tuskers ===
Mruczkowski came out of retirement by signing with the Florida Tuskers of the United Football League on August 25, 2009. He was placed on injured reserve on October 20.
