= Matt Chatham =

American football player (born 1977)

No. 58
- Position: Linebacker

Personal information
- Born: June 28, 1977 (age 49); Newton, Iowa, U.S.
- Listed height: 6 ft 4 in (1.93 m)
- Listed weight: 250 lb (113 kg)

Career information
- High school: Sioux City North (Sioux City, Iowa)
- College: South Dakota
- NFL draft: 1999: undrafted

Career history
- St. Louis Rams (1999–2000)*; New England Patriots (2000–2005); New York Jets (2006–2008)
- * Offseason or practice squad member only

Awards and highlights
- 3× Super Bowl champion (XXXVI, XXXVIII, XXXIX)

Career NFL statistics
- Total tackles: 143
- Sacks: 2.5
- Forced fumbles: 1
- Fumble recoveries: 2
- Defensive touchdowns: 1
- Stats at Pro Football Reference

Matthew L. Chatham (born June 28, 1977) is an American former professional football player who was a linebacker in the National Football League (NFL). He played college football for the South Dakota Coyotes before playing in the NFL for the New England Patriots and New York Jets.

== Early life ==
Chatham attended Sioux City North High School in Sioux City, Iowa, and won All-State honors in football and baseball.

== College career ==
Chatham attended the University of South Dakota. As a junior, he made 95 tackles and six interceptions. In his senior year he made 74 tackles and one interception. He was a double major in English and Criminal Justice at South Dakota.

Chatham received a Masters in Business Administration from Babson College in 2011.

== Professional career ==
Chatham was signed by the St. Louis Rams as a rookie free agent but was released before the start of the regular season.

He spent the first six seasons of his career in New England, including contributing to three of the Patriots' Super Bowl victories (XXXVI, XXXVIII, XXXIX). He was known as one of the leaders of the Patriots' special teams. During the 2003 season, he recorded his first and only NFL touchdown when he recovered a Tiki Barber fumble in a game against the New York Giants and returned it for a 38-yard touchdown. In Super Bowl XXXVIII, he tackled streaker Mark Roberts, who had come onto the field just before the second-half kickoff.

== NFL career statistics ==
=== Regular season ===
Year	Team	Games		Tackles					Interceptions					Fumbles			
Year	Team	GP	GS	Cmb	Solo	Ast	Sck	Sfty	Int	Yds	Lng	TD	PD	FF	FR	Yds	TD
2000	NE	6	0	2	2	0	0.0	0	0	0	0	0	0	0	0	0	0
2001	NE	11	0	14	13	1	0.0	0	0	0	0	0	0	0	0	0	0
2002	NE	13	0	17	14	3	0.0	0	0	0	0	0	0	0	0	0	0
2003	NE	16	4	38	25	13	1.5	0	0	0	0	0	0	1	2	38	1
2004	NE	5	0	2	2	0	0.0	0	0	0	0	0	0	0	0	0	0
2005	NE	15	0	23	16	7	1.0	0	0	0	0	0	1	0	0	0	0
2006	NYJ	16	0	29	16	13	0.0	0	0	0	0	0	0	0	0	0	0
2007	NYJ	9	0	18	12	6	0.0	0	0	0	0	0	0	0	0	0	0
Career		91	4	143	100	43	2.5	0	0	0	0	0	1	1	2	38	1

== Retirement career ==
Chatham now runs an NFL informational column in the Boston Herald called "The Chatham Report" and appears every Sunday morning on WEEI with Kevin Faulk, Dale Arnold and Christopher Price. He can be found on Twitter under @chatham58. He is a regular columnist on the Football By Football website. Chatham is also an in-studio football analyst with NESN.

He has also received his MBA from Babson College and has started a creperie restaurant franchise called Skycrepers.
