= Ben Herbstreit =

Emotional support dog for Kirk Herbstreit (died 2024)

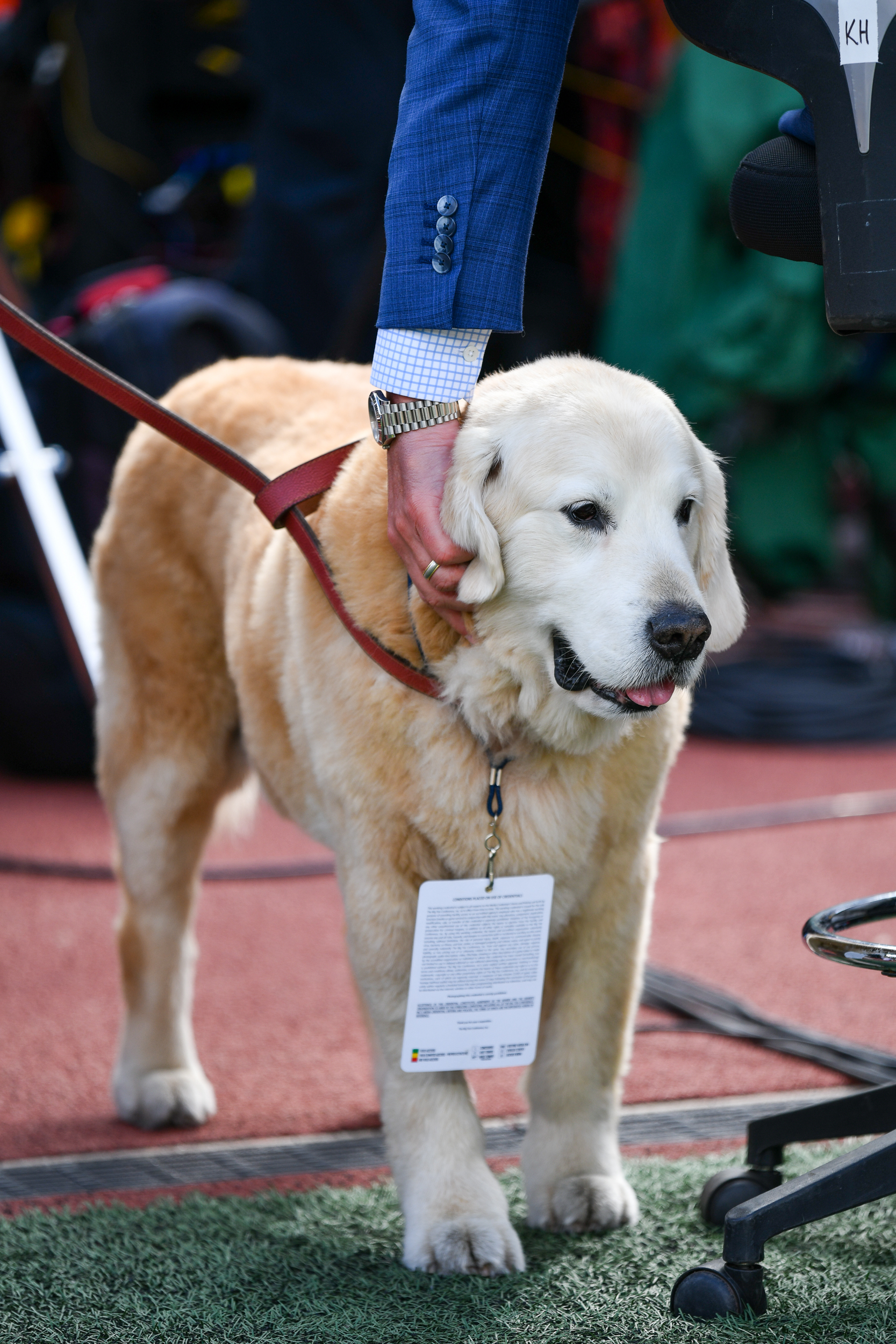
Ben at Ferry Field, Ann Arbor, Michigan in September 2024

Ben Herbstreit (c. 2014 – November 7, 2024) was a golden retriever known for accompanying his owner and companion, Kirk Herbstreit, during college football and NFL events. Ben served as a certified emotional support animal for Kirk, and he quickly became popular with fans.

== Life ==
Ben was first seen on College GameDay in 2021 before a matchup between the Cincinnati Bearcats and Tulsa Golden Hurricane.

In 2023, Kirk Herbstreit's son underwent treatment for a heart condition after being hospitalized; Kirk began bringing Ben around to support himself while he was away from home. Ben normally spent the first half of college football games in an ESPN bus and then during the second half, went up to the booth.

During a December 2023 Thursday Night Football broadcast, Ben met players before the game and joined Kirk and Al Michaels in the booth with his own headset. Michaels was a fan of Ben too, complaining to Kirk when Ben didn't attend a production meeting.

Following a meeting with Uga XI (the University of Georgia's mascot) at the 2023 SEC Championship Game, the Associated Press described Ben as the "new top dog in football".

Ben received media accreditation for the 2024 Rose Bowl, the first dog to ever do so, and was named the "Chief Happiness Officer". He received other press credentials for college and NFL games under different titles, including "Treat Analyst", "Chief Happiness Officer of Football" and "Wide Retriever".

== Health and death ==
In March 2024, Ben was diagnosed with leukemia and lymphoma, undergoing surgery in July. He died on November 7, 2024, at age 10. Following Ben's passing, Ben's younger brother Peter started to travel with Herbstreit and began appearing on Thursday Night Football and College GameDay.

On December 4, 2024, Kirk Herbstreit posted to social media a heartfelt letter he received from President Joe Biden offering him condolences on the passing of Ben.

== See also ==
- List of individual dogs
