= David Givens =

American football player (born 1980)

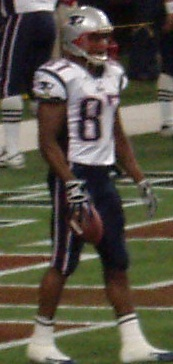

No. 87
- Position: Wide receiver

Personal information
- Born: August 16, 1980 (age 46); Youngstown, Ohio, U.S.
- Listed height: 6 ft 0 in (1.83 m)
- Listed weight: 215 lb (98 kg)

Career information
- High school: Humble (Humble, Texas)
- College: Notre Dame
- NFL draft: 2002: 7th round, 253rd overall pick

Career history
- New England Patriots (2002–2005); Tennessee Titans (2006–2007)

Awards and highlights
- 2× Super Bowl champion (XXXVIII, XXXIX)

Career NFL statistics
- Receptions: 166
- Receiving yards: 2,318
- Receiving touchdowns: 12
- Stats at Pro Football Reference

David Lamar Givens (born August 16, 1980) is an American former professional football player who was a wide receiver in the National Football League (NFL). He played college football for the Notre Dame Fighting Irish, primarily as a running back. He was selected by the New England Patriots in the seventh round of the 2002 NFL draft.

Givens also played for the Tennessee Titans.

== Professional career ==
Pre-draft measurables
Height	Weight	Arm length	Hand span	40-yard dash	10-yard split	20-yard split	20-yard shuttle	Three-cone drill	Vertical jump	Broad jump
6 ft 0 in (1.83 m)	217 lb (98 kg)	31 1/2 in (0.80 m)	9 1/4 in (0.23 m)	4.57 s	1.58 s	2.65 s	4.13 s	6.82 s	40.5 in (1.03 m)	10 ft 6 in (3.20 m)
All values from NFL Combine

=== New England Patriots ===
Givens was drafted in the seventh round of the 2002 NFL Draft with the 253rd overall pick. Givens caught nine passes and one touchdown his rookie year for the New England Patriots in 2002, and improved in each of the next two seasons. He posted 34 catches and led his team with six touchdowns in 2003 and 56 catches in 2004 despite scoring just three times. His best performances in his career came in the postseason. Beginning with the 2003 AFC Championship Game against the Indianapolis Colts, Givens scored at least one touchdown the Patriots' next seven playoff games, including both Super Bowl XXXVIII and Super Bowl XXXIX. In 2005, Givens caught a career-high 59 passes and was the Patriots' number two receiver for the second year in a row.

In Super Bowl XXXIX against the Philadelphia Eagles, Givens mocked the wing-flap celebration of Eagles receiver Terrell Owens after catching a four-yard touchdown from Tom Brady.

Givens was the Patriots' record holder in postseason touchdown receptions until 2015, before being surpassed by Rob Gronkowski who scored his eighth playoff touchdown against the Kansas City Chiefs in the Divisional Round of the NFL playoffs on January 20, 2016, and has the second-longest streak of consecutive post-season games with a touchdown reception, with seven.

=== Tennessee Titans ===
Givens signed a 5-year deal worth $24 million with the Tennessee Titans on March 14, 2006. His first season with the Titans ended prematurely in Week 10, after he tore his anterior cruciate ligament. He also missed the entire 2007 season. On February 27, 2008, he was released by the Titans. In 2009 Givens sued the Titans for $25 Million claiming that his ACL tear was due to the Titans doctors failing to adequately test his knee, his lawsuit was dismissed in 2010.

== NFL career statistics ==
Year	Team	Games	Receptions	Yards	Yards per Reception	Longest Reception	Touchdowns	First Downs	Fumbles	Fumbles Lost
2002	NE	12	9	92	10.2	30	1	4	1	0
2003	NE	13	34	510	15.0	57	6	24	0	0
2004	NE	15	56	874	15.6	50	3	47	0	0
2005	NE	13	59	738	12.5	40	2	32	0	0
2006	TEN	5	8	104	13.0	27	0	5	0	0
Career		58	166	2,318	14.0	57	12	112	1	0
