= Pepper Johnson =

American football player and coach (born 1964)

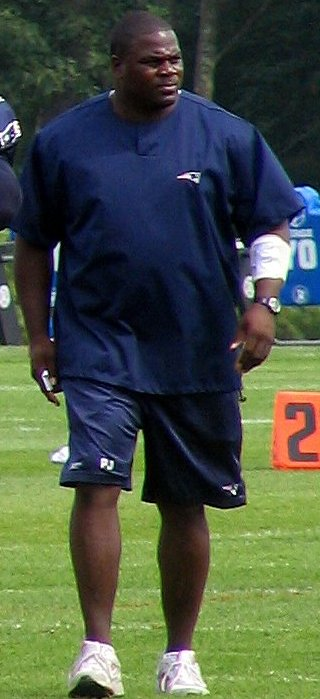
- Johnson as a coach for the New England Patriots in 2007

No. 52, 53, 99
- Position: Linebacker

Personal information
- Born: July 29, 1964 (age 62); Detroit, Michigan, U.S.
- Listed height: 6 ft 3 in (1.91 m)
- Listed weight: 259 lb (117 kg)

Career information
- High school: Mackenzie (Detroit)
- College: Ohio State (1982–1985)
- NFL draft: 1986: 2nd round, 51st overall pick

Career history

Playing
- New York Giants (1986–1992); Cleveland Browns (1993–1995); Detroit Lions (1996); New York Jets (1997–1998)

Coaching
- New England Patriots (2000–2013) Assistant linebackers coach (2000) Inside linebackers coach (2001–2003) Defensive line coach (2004–2011) Linebackers coach (2012–2013); Buffalo Bills (2014) Defensive line coach; New York Jets (2015–2016) Defensive line coach; Memphis Express (2019) Linebackers coach; Los Angeles Wildcats (2020) Defensive coordinator/linebackers coach; IMG Academy (2021) Head coach; Tampa Bay Bandits (2022) Defensive coordinator/defensive line coach

Awards and highlights
- As player: 2× Super Bowl champion (XXI, XXV); First-team All-Pro (1990); 2× Pro Bowl (1990, 1994); 75th greatest New York Giant of all-time; First-team All-American (1985); 2× First-team All-Big Ten (1984, 1985); As coach: 3× Super Bowl champion (XXXVI, XXXVIII, XXXIX)

Career NFL statistics
- Tackles: 983
- Sacks: 25.5
- Interceptions: 14
- Defensive touchdowns: 2
- Stats at Pro Football Reference

Thomas "Pepper" Johnson (born July 29, 1964) is an American football coach and former linebacker who played in the National Football League (NFL) for 13 seasons, the first seven of which were for the New York Giants. He won two Super Bowls with the Giants before playing for the Cleveland Browns, Detroit Lions and New York Jets.

After his playing career ended, Johnson began working as an assistant coach for the New England Patriots. In New England he was reunited with Bill Belichick, for whom Johnson played as a Giant and Brown. He spent 14 seasons with the organization, winning three Super Bowls, before leaving the Patriots to work as the defensive line coach for the Buffalo Bills and then the New York Jets. After a stint as the Memphis Express' defensive coordinator in 2019, he joined the XFL. He had a brief stint with the Los Angeles Wildcats as their defensive coordinator in 2020, and the Tampa Bay Bandits of the USFL in 2022.

== Playing career ==
=== College ===
Upon graduation from Detroit's Mackenzie High School, Johnson played college football for the Ohio State University Buckeyes under head coach Earle Bruce. Johnson lettered every year from 1982 to 1985, and led the team in tackles in 1984 and 1985. He was a team co-captain and named defensive MVP by his teammates in 1984 and 1985, and in 1985 was named as an All-American. Johnson ended his college career with 379 total tackles, 5 sacks, and 12 tackles for loss. He was inducted into the Ohio State Varsity O Hall of Fame in 2001.

=== NFL ===
Johnson was drafted by the New York Giants in the second round of the 1986 NFL draft. With the Giants, he was a member of both the Super Bowl XXI and Super Bowl XXV-winning teams, under head coach Bill Parcells and assistant Bill Belichick. After seven seasons in New York, Johnson re-joined Belichick with the Cleveland Browns in 1993, Belichick's third season as the team's head coach. After the 1995 season, the Browns moved to Baltimore, Maryland, and neither Belichick nor Johnson followed the team there. Johnson instead joined the Detroit Lions, whom he spent one season with in 1996. For what would become the final two seasons of his career, Johnson again re-joined Belichick, who was then serving as the defensive coordinator for the New York Jets under Parcells. After the 1998 season, Johnson retired from the NFL with career totals of 25.5 sacks, 12 forced fumbles, 14 interceptions, and had 983 tackles.

== Coaching career ==
Johnson began his coaching career as an assistant linebackers coach with the Patriots during the 2000 season. Johnson then served as the Patriots' inside linebackers coach from 2001 through 2003, before moving to defensive line coach in 2004. In 2012, he returned to linebackers coach.

With Bill Gutman, Johnson wrote Won For All, an account of the Patriots 2001 championship season, which was published by Contemporary Books, a McGraw-Hill company, ISBN 0-07-140877-0.

On January 21, 2014, Johnson announced he would be leaving the Patriots. On January 31, 2014, the Buffalo Bills announced Johnson as their new defensive line coach, replacing Anthony Weaver, who left for a similar position in Cleveland. After Doug Marrone quit as the Bills head Coach, Johnson was hired as the Jets Defensive Line coach. He was fired after the 2016 season.

On December 18, 2018, Johnson was hired as the defensive line coach for the Memphis Express of the Alliance of American Football. In that role, he worked under head coach Mike Singletary. After the league's midseason shutdown in 2019, he joined the Los Angeles Wildcats for the 2020 season as defensive coordinator and linebackers coach. However, he was fired days after the Wildcats lost the season opener to the Houston Roughnecks 37–17, a game that saw Los Angeles' defense allow four passing touchdowns. In 2021, Johnson was hired as head coach of the IMG Academy in Bradenton, Florida.

== Personal life ==
Johnson's nickname of "Pepper" originated from his aunt who noticed Johnson liked to put black pepper on his corn flakes. Pepper's son, Dionte Johnson (born June 28, 1986) is a former fullback for the Ohio State Buckeyes and the Arizona Cardinals. Dionte was elected as a captain of the Ohio State team in 2007, making Pepper and Dionte only the third father-son captains (after Jim and Kirk Herbstreit and James and Jeff Davidson) in Buckeye history. Pepper also has a daughter, Aanjeya Johnson, (born May 20, 2009) with his wife Shanna, a realtor from Massachusetts.
