= Ethan Kelley =

American football player (born 1980)

No. 99, 78
- Position: Defensive tackle

Personal information
- Born: February 12, 1980 (age 46); Amarillo, Texas, U.S.
- Listed height: 6 ft 2 in (1.88 m)
- Listed weight: 320 lb (145 kg)

Career information
- High school: Kempner (Sugar Land, Texas)
- College: Baylor
- NFL draft: 2003: 7th round, 243rd overall pick

Career history
- New England Patriots (2003–2004); Cleveland Browns (2005–2007)

Awards and highlights
- 2× Super Bowl champion (XXXVIII, XXXIX)

Career NFL statistics
- Total tackles: 63
- Sacks: 2
- Forced fumbles: 1
- Stats at Pro Football Reference

Ethan Jeffrey Arthur Kelley (born February 12, 1980) is an American former professional football player who was a defensive tackle in the National Football League (NFL). He was selected by the New England Patriots in the seventh round of the 2003 NFL draft. He played college football for the Baylor Bears.

== Early life ==
Kelley attended Kempner High School in Sugar Land, Texas. As a senior, he was an All-District selection as both an offensive and defensive lineman, and on defense, posted two sacks, 67 tackles, and two pass deflections.

== College career ==
Kelley played college football for the Baylor Bears. He started 21 games on the offensive line as a freshman and sophomore. Midway through spring training in 2001, Kelley was switched to defensive line. During the two seasons that he played defense, Kelley made 133 tackles and four sacks. He majored in business and graduated in May 2003.

== Professional career ==
=== New England Patriots ===
Kelley was selected by the New England Patriots in the seventh round (243rd overall) of the 2003 NFL draft. He was later released and signed to the Patriots practice squad, where he spent the 2003 season. He played in one game during the 2004 season before being waived and signed by the Cleveland Browns. During the 2005 season, he appeared in 11 games. He started two of those games against the Miami Dolphins and the Minnesota Vikings before going on injured reserve. In 2006, he continued as the second string NT behind Ted Washington and also began transitioning to left defensive end, where he played one game.

=== Cleveland Browns ===
Kelley was signed to a new one-year contract by the Cleveland Browns on April 19, 2007. Kelley underwent microfracture surgery on his knee after the 2007 season and went unsigned.
