= December 2003 nor'easter =

Snowstorm in the United States

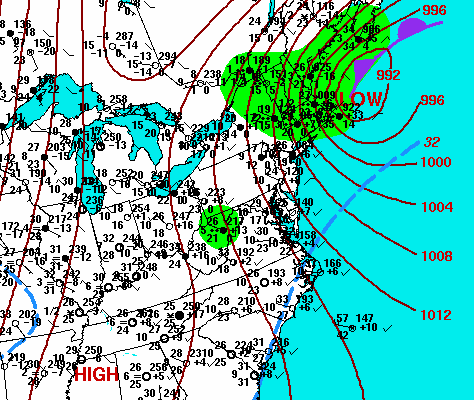
- Surface weather analysis of the storm on December 7, 2003

Meteorological history
- Formed: December 5, 2003
- Dissipated: December 8, 2003

Category 3 "Major" winter storm
- Regional snowfall index: 9.40 (NOAA)
- Lowest pressure: 992 mb (29.29 inHg)
- Maximum snowfall or ice accretion: 52 inches (130 cm) in northern New Hampshire

Overall effects
- Fatalities: 13
- Areas affected: Midwestern United States, Eastern United States (especially the Mid-Atlantic and New England states)

The December 2003 New England snowstorm was a severe nor'easter that impacted the Eastern United States during the first week of the month. It produced heavy snowfall throughout the New England and Mid-Atlantic regions, exceeding 40 inches (100 cm) in northern New England. The cyclone had complex origins, involving several individual weather disturbances. An area of low pressure primarily associated with the southern branch of the jet stream spread light precipitation across portions of the Midwest and Southeast. The low reached the coast on December 5 and continued to produce snow throughout the Mid-Atlantic. Another system involving the northern branch of the jet stream merged with the initial storm, causing another coastal storm to develop. This storm soon became the primary feature as it intensified and moved northeastward. It reached Cape Cod on December 6, but became nearly stationary through the morning of December 7. It had finally dissipated by December 8.

Conditions surrounding the storm allowed for several bands of heavy snowfall to set up over New York State and New England, including a small area of 4 in (100 mm) per hour snowfall rates in the Hudson Valley. As a result of extremely cold temperatures over the region, snowfall accumulations were generally significant and broke several daily records. At Albany, New York, 12.5 in (320 mm) of snow fell in just one day. Locations affected by the storm commonly picked up 17 to 24 in (430 to 610 mm), with totals occasionally exceeding 30 in (760 mm).

The event led to widespread travel delays from Washington, D.C. to Boston, and around 13 people died because of the storm. 35.6 inches of snow fell just 14 miles north of Boston in the city of Peabody, Massachusetts. The nor'easter was among the largest early-season winter storms on record to affect the major East Coast cities. Many areas reported blizzard-like conditions.

== See also ==
- Climate of the United States
- List of New England hurricanes
