= Bethel Johnson =

American gridiron football player (born 1979)

No. 81
- Positions: Wide receiver, kick returner

Personal information
- Born: February 11, 1979 (age 47); Dallas, Texas, U.S.
- Listed height: 5 ft 11 in (1.80 m)
- Listed weight: 200 lb (91 kg)

Career information
- High school: Corsicana (TX)
- College: Texas A&M
- NFL draft: 2003: 2nd round, 45th overall pick

Career history
- New England Patriots (2003–2005); New Orleans Saints (2006); Minnesota Vikings (2006); Philadelphia Eagles (2007)*; Houston Texans (2007)*; Toronto Argonauts (2008)
- * Offseason or practice squad member only

Awards and highlights
- 2× Super Bowl champion (XXXVIII, XXXIX); PFWA All-Rookie Team (2003); New England Patriots All-Dynasty Team

Career NFL statistics
- Receptions: 39
- Receiving yards: 606
- Receiving touchdowns: 4
- Return yards: 3,632
- Return touchdowns: 2
- Stats at Pro Football Reference

Bethel Johnson (born February 11, 1979) is an American former professional football player who was a wide receiver in the National Football League (NFL). He was selected by the New England Patriots in the second round of the 2003 NFL draft. He played college football for Texas A&M Aggies.

Johnson earned two Super Bowl rings with the Patriots in Super Bowl XXXVIII and Super Bowl XXXIX. He was also a member of the New Orleans Saints, Minnesota Vikings, Philadelphia Eagles, Houston Texans and Toronto Argonauts.

== Early life ==
Johnson attended Corsicana High School in Corsicana, Texas and as a senior, he led his team to the Class 4A state title game, and made 44 receptions for 1495 yards and 17 receiving touchdowns.

== College career ==
Johnson attended Texas A&M University, and finished his college football career with 117 receptions for 1740 yards (14.9 yards per reception), and 11 receiving touchdowns. His 117 receptions and 1740 receiving yards both rank second in school career records.

- Sophomore - 27 catches for 514 yards and 3 TD.
- Junior - 42 catches for 440 yards and 0 TD.
- Redshirt Senior - 40 catches for 718 yards and 8 TD. He also averaged 21 yards per KR and 11.6 yards per PR.

== Professional career ==
Pre-draft measurables
Height	Weight	Arm length	Hand span	40-yard dash	10-yard split	20-yard split	Vertical jump	Broad jump	Bench press
5 ft 11 in (1.80 m)	201 lb (91 kg)	31 1/4 in (0.79 m)	8 1/2 in (0.22 m)	4.30 s	1.55 s	2.60 s	38.5 in (0.98 m)	10 ft 7 in (3.23 m)	17 reps
All values from NFL Combine/Pro Day

=== New England Patriots ===
Johnson was selected 45th overall in the 2003 NFL draft. In his rookie season, ranked second in the NFL with a 28.2 yards per kickoff return average, returning 30 kickoffs for 847 yards and a touchdown, while also catching 16 passes for 209 yards and 2 scores. In 2003 and 2004 he won the Super Bowl with the New England Patriots.

=== New Orleans Saints ===
He was traded to the Saints on June 5, 2006, for defensive tackle Johnathan Sullivan, who was drafted sixth overall by the Saints in 2003. Saints coach, Sean Payton, questioned Johnson's "conditioning, his stamina and endurance" during the preseason.

Johnson was cut from the Saints before the 2006 regular season began after injuring his knee in a preseason game.

=== Minnesota Vikings ===
Johnson was then signed by the Minnesota Vikings on October 10, 2006. He appeared in 11 games with two starts for the Vikings that season, catching nine passes for 156 yards. He became a free agent in the 2007 offseason.

=== Philadelphia Eagles ===
On March 8, 2007, he signed a one-year contract with the Philadelphia Eagles. He was released on June 5, after he failed a physical.

=== Houston Texans ===
On July 9, 2007, Johnson signed with the Houston Texans. However, he was released on August 31, during final cuts and spent the rest of the season out of football.

=== Toronto Argonauts ===
On May 26, 2008, Johnson was signed by the Toronto Argonauts of the Canadian Football League. He was released on September 30, due to his lack of progress; ranking just seventh on the team in receiving with 16 catches for 189 yards and no touchdowns.
