= Dedric Ward =

American football player and coach (born 1974)

No. 89, 87, 85, 17
- Position: Wide receiver

Personal information
- Born: September 29, 1974 (age 52); Cedar Rapids, Iowa, U.S.
- Listed height: 5 ft 9 in (1.75 m)
- Listed weight: 189 lb (86 kg)

Career information
- High school: Cedar Rapids (IA) Washington
- College: Northern Iowa
- NFL draft: 1997: 3rd round, 88th overall pick

Career history

Playing
- New York Jets (1997–2000); Miami Dolphins (2001–2002); New England Patriots (2003)*; Baltimore Ravens (2003); New England Patriots (2003); Dallas Cowboys (2004)
- * Offseason or practice squad member only

Coaching
- Missouri State (2006) Wide receivers coach; Arizona Cardinals (2007–2008) Offensive quality control coach; Kansas City Chiefs (2009) Wide receivers coach; Northern Iowa (2010) Wide receivers coach

Awards and highlights
- Super Bowl champion (XXXVIII); 2× Gateway Offensive Player Of The Year (1995, 1996); 2× Division I-AA All-American (1995, 1996); 3× All-Gateway (1994, 1995, 1996)

Career NFL statistics
- Receptions: 167
- Receiving yards: 2,307
- Receiving touchdowns: 12
- Stats at Pro Football Reference

Dedric Lamar Ward (born September 29, 1974) is an American former professional football player who was a wide receiver in the National Football League (NFL) for the New York Jets, Miami Dolphins, Baltimore Ravens, New England Patriots and Dallas Cowboys. He also was an assistant coach in the NFL. He played college football at University of Northern Iowa.

== Early life ==
Ward attended Washington High School, where he played as a running back and wide receiver. He also practiced basketball.

He accepted a football scholarship from Division I-AA University of Northern Iowa. He became a starter at wide receiver as a sophomore. As a junior, he caught 50 receptions for 1,283 yards and 15 touchdowns, leading the nation with 116.4 receiving yards per game.

As a senior, he posted 70 receptions for 1,556 yards and 17 touchdowns. On special teams, he averaged 11.1 yards per punt return, with 2 touchdowns. He returned 2 kickoffs (one for 45 yards). Against Illinois State University, he set a school record with 247 receiving yards, while also scoring 3 touchdowns.

Ward finished his career as the school's and conference's All-time leading wide receiver with 176 receptions for 3,876 yards (second in Division I-AA history to Jerry Rice), 41 touchdown receptions (second in school history) and 304 career points. He was the only player in Gateway Football Conference history to produce 3 consecutive seasons of over 1,000 yards, leading the conference each year. He had a mark of 27 consecutive games with a reception and also blocked 2 punts.

He was a part of the track team, placing third in the 55 metres with a time of 6.33 seconds at the Gateway Indoor Championships his senior season. He set a school record in the 200 metres with a time of 20.86 seconds.

In 2010, he was inducted into the University of Northern Iowa Athletics Hall of Fame.

== Professional career ==
=== New York Jets ===
Ward was selected by the New York Jets in the third round (88th overall) of the 1997 NFL draft, because his special teams production reminded head coach Bill Parcells of David Meggett.

In 1998, he started 4 games, recording 25 receptions for 477 yards and 4 touchdowns, with a 19.1-yard average. He had a career-high 71-yard touchdown reception in the AFC East division clinching win against the Buffalo Bills. He had 5 receptions for 61 yards in the AFC Championship game against the Denver Broncos.

In 1999, when Wayne Chrebet broke a bone in his foot in preseason, he became the No. 2 receiver for the first five games of the regular season. He ended up starting 10 games as the team's deep threat, collecting 22 receptions for 325 yards and 3 touchdowns, while averaging 7.6 yards on 38 punt returns.

In 2000, he became a full-time starter after Keyshawn Johnson was traded to the Tampa Bay Buccaneers. He had a breakout year, posting 16 starts, 54 receptions (fourth on the team) for 801 yards (third on the team) and 3 touchdowns. He returned 27 punts for a 7.9-yard average. Against the Baltimore Ravens, he had 8 receptions for 147 yards and one touchdown.

=== Miami Dolphins ===
On April 18, 2001, he was signed as a free agent by the Miami Dolphins. In August, he suffered a left foot stress fracture and missed a month. He was a backup behind Oronde Gadsden, appearing in 13 games (one start), with 21 receptions (13 for first down conversions) and 209 yards.

In 2002, he appeared in 16 games, returning 16 punts with 10.6-yard average and making 19 receptions for 172 yards. He was released in a salary-cap move on February 26, 2003.

=== New England Patriots (first stint) ===
On May 22, 2003, he was signed as a free agent by the New England Patriots, reuniting with offensive coordinator Charlie Weis, who had the same role with the Jets. On August 31, he was released after being passed on the depth chart by David Patten.

=== Baltimore Ravens ===
On October 6, 2003, he was signed by the Baltimore Ravens as a free agent, to be used to return punts. He appeared in 3 games and was declared inactive in 3 contests. He was released on November 18.

=== New England Patriots (second stint) ===
On November 20, 2003, he was signed as a free agent by the New England Patriots to add depth to the wide receiver position. He appeared in 4 games and was declared inactive in 2 contests. He played in each postseason game playing a part of the Super Bowl XXXVIII winning team. He was targeted by Tom Brady 4 times in the three postseason games making one catch for 22 yards in the Patriots divisional round win over the Titans.

=== Dallas Cowboys ===
On June 11, 2004, he was signed by the Dallas Cowboys as a free agent, reuniting with Bill Parcells who was also his head coach with the Jets. On June 24, he suffered a right broken foot while working out in the team's facility. On July 31, he returned to practice. He appeared in 8 games and was declared inactive in 7 contests. He made one reception for 5 yards, one carry for 11 rushing yards and returned 14 punts for an 8.1-yard average. He was released on December 31.

Ward played in 103 regular-season games (26 starts) during his NFL career with 167 receptions for 2,307 yards and 12 touchdowns, to go along with 123 punt returns for 1,026 yards.

== Coaching career ==
Ward first served as wide receivers coach for Missouri State in 2006. He was hired by the head coach Ken Whisenhunt and the Arizona Cardinals as offensive quality control coach on March 21, 2007. He was signed by the Kansas City Chiefs to be an offensive quality control coach for the 2009 season.

== Personal life ==
He is currently teaching in high school. He has one son, Mason Ward, who lives with him in Cedar Rapids, Iowa.
