= Dionte Johnson =

American football player (born 1986)

No. 44
- Position: Fullback

Personal information
- Born: June 28, 1986 (age 40); Columbus, Ohio, U.S.
- Listed height: 6 ft 0 in (1.83 m)
- Listed weight: 238 lb (108 kg)

Career information
- College: Ohio State
- NFL draft: 2008: undrafted

Career history
- Arizona Cardinals (2008)*
- * Offseason or practice squad member only

Dionte' Johnson (born June 28, 1986) is an American former professional football fullback for the Arizona Cardinals of the National Football League (NFL). He was signed by the Cardinals as an undrafted free agent in 2008. He played college football at Ohio State. He was released by the Cardinals because of an ankle injury.

Johnson owns and operates Sole Classics, a sneakers boutique with locations in Columbus and Dublin, Ohio, and Kingsrowe, a clothing brand.

== Personal life ==
He is the son of former NFL linebacker Pepper Johnson and Monica Hawkins. Johnson's godfather, Keith Byars, is a former NFL running back for the Philadelphia Eagles, Miami Dolphins, New England Patriots and New York Jets. Johnson was married in 2013 to Jessica Ingram.
