= Super Bowl XXXVI =

2002 National Football League championship game

St. Louis Rams (1) (NFC) (14–2)	New England Patriots (2) (AFC) (11–5)
17	20
Head coach: Mike Martz	Head coach: Bill Belichick
	1	2	3	4	Total
STL	3	0	0	14	17
NE	0	14	3	3	20
- Date: February 3, 2002
- Stadium: Louisiana Superdome; New Orleans, Louisiana
- MVP: Tom Brady, quarterback
- Favorite: Rams by 14
- Referee: Bernie Kukar
- Attendance: 72,922

Ceremonies
- National anthem: Mariah Carey
- Coin toss: George H. W. Bush and Roger Staubach
- Halftime show: U2

TV in the United States
- Network: Fox
- Announcers: Pat Summerall, John Madden, Pam Oliver and Ron Pitts
- Nielsen ratings: 40.4 (est. 86.8 million viewers)
- Market share: 61
- Cost of 30-second commercial: $1.9 million

Radio in the United States
- Network: Westwood One
- Announcers: Howard David, Boomer Esiason, John Dockery and James Lofton

Super Bowl XXXVI was an American football game between the National Football Conference (NFC) champion St. Louis Rams and the American Football Conference (AFC) champion New England Patriots to decide the National Football League (NFL) champion for the 2001 season. The underdog Patriots defeated the heavily favored Rams by a score of 20–17, widely considered one of the largest upsets in the history of North American professional sports. It was the Patriots' first Super Bowl championship, and the franchise's first league championship of any kind. (Note: The Patriots lost three previous league championship games: 1963 AFL Championship; Super Bowl XX; Super Bowl XXXI) The game was also notable for snapping the AFC East's long streak of not being able to win a Super Bowl championship, as the division's teams had lost 8 Super Bowls between the Miami Dolphins' victory in 1974 and the Patriots' 2002 win. This was the last Super Bowl to feature the Rams in St. Louis after relocating to Los Angeles in 2016, the Rams then returned to the NFL's championship game in Super Bowl LIII, in which they were again defeated by the Patriots. The Rams would not win another Super Bowl until Super Bowl LVI, as the Los Angeles Rams, defeating the Cincinnati Bengals. This Super Bowl was also notable for being the first to feature quarterback Tom Brady, who was, at the time, a little-known first-year starter who had begun the season as a backup. Brady would go on to win a record seven Super Bowl titles throughout his 23-season NFL career.

The game was played at the Louisiana Superdome in New Orleans, Louisiana, on February 3, 2002. Following the terrorist attacks on September 11, 2001 earlier in the season, the NFL postponed a week of regular-season games and moved the league's playoff schedule back. As a result, Super Bowl XXXVI was rescheduled from the original date of January 27 to February 3, becoming the first Super Bowl played in February. The pregame ceremonies and the halftime show headlined by the Irish rock band U2 honored the victims of 9/11. Due to heightened security measures following the attacks, this was the first Super Bowl designated as a National Special Security Event (NSSE) by the Office of Homeland Security (OHS). The Department of Homeland Security (DHS), which replaced the OHS in 2003, later established the practice of naming each subsequent Super Bowl an NSSE. Additionally, it was the last Super Bowl to be played in New Orleans before Hurricane Katrina ravaged the city on August 29, 2005; the first since then was Super Bowl XLVII in 2013.

This game marked the Rams' third Super Bowl appearance in franchise history and the second in three seasons. The Rams posted an NFL-best 14–2 regular season record, led by quarterback Kurt Warner and "The Greatest Show on Turf" offense. The Patriots clinched their third Super Bowl berth after posting an 11–5 regular season record, led by second-year quarterback and first-year starter Tom Brady and a defense that ended the regular season ranked sixth in scoring.

Although the Rams out-gained the Patriots 427–267 in total yards, the Patriots built a 17–3 third-quarter lead off three Rams turnovers. After a holding penalty in the fourth quarter negated a Patriots fumble return for a touchdown, Warner scored a 2-yard touchdown run and threw a 26-yard touchdown pass to tie the game, 17–17, with 1:30 remaining. Without any timeouts, Brady led the Patriots down the field to set up kicker Adam Vinatieri's game-winning 48-yard field goal as time expired. Brady, who completed 16 of 27 passes for 145 yards and a touchdown, was named Super Bowl MVP. With the Rams being 14-point favorites, it was the biggest upset in a Super Bowl since Super Bowl III and, as of the 2024 season, the biggest upset since the AFL–NFL merger. Many media outlets regard this Super Bowl as one of the best Super Bowls of all time, and one of the most historically significant Super Bowls due to its finale that launched the New England Patriots dynasty, while closing the door on Rams' budding dynasty. During the NFL's 100th anniversary, this game was ranked as No. 20 of the NFL's Greatest Games of all time.

== Background ==
=== Teams ===
==== St. Louis Rams ====
After the Rams’ 1999 season that had culminated in a gripping victory over the Tennessee Titans in Super Bowl XXXIV, their offense again dominated the league in 2000, leading the NFL in passing, scoring, and total yards. However, the Rams had one of the worst defenses in the league, ranking last in points allowed (471). This, along with injury problems and a coaching change from championship-winning head coach Dick Vermeil – who resigned just 48 hours after the game – to his offensive coordinator Mike Martz, caused the Rams to slip to a 10–6 record in 2000. The season ended with a disappointing loss to the New Orleans Saints in the wild card round of the playoffs.

After signing several new defensive players in the off-season, and hiring new defensive coordinator Lovie Smith, the Rams finished the 2001 season with the NFL's best regular season record at 14–2. They led the league in both total offensive yards (6,930) and scoring (503). This was the Rams' third consecutive season with over 500 points, an NFL record. On defense, they only allowed 271 points, improving their 31st ranking in 2000 to 7th in 2001.

The Rams' 1999–2001 offense, nicknamed "The Greatest Show on Turf", is widely considered one of the best in NFL history. The team possessed an incredible amount of offensive talent at nearly every position. In 2001, quarterback Kurt Warner had the best season of his career and was awarded his second and final NFL Most Valuable Player Award after throwing for 4,830 yards and 36 touchdowns, but he also threw 22 interceptions, and earned a league high 101.4 passer rating. Wide receivers Torry Holt and Isaac Bruce each amassed over 1,100 receiving yards, combining for 142 receptions, 2,469 yards, and 13 touchdowns. Wide receiver Ricky Proehl caught 40 passes for 563 yards and 5 touchdowns. Tight end Ernie Conwell caught 38 passes for 431 yards and 4 touchdowns. Wide receiver Az-Zahir Hakim caught 39 passes for 374 yards, and added another 333 yards returning punts.

Halfback Marshall Faulk won NFL Offensive Player of the Year Award for the third year in a row in 2001. He rushed for 1,382 yards, caught 83 passes for 765 yards, scored 21 touchdowns, and became the first NFL player ever to gain more than 2,000 combined rushing and receiving yards for 4 consecutive seasons. Running back Trung Canidate was also a major contributor, rushing for 441 yards, catching 17 passes for 154 yards, returning kickoffs for 748 yards, and scoring 6 touchdowns. The Rams offensive line was led by guard Adam Timmerman and offensive tackle Orlando Pace, who was selected to the Pro Bowl for the third consecutive year.

The Rams' defense ranked third in the league in fewest yards allowed (4,733). The line was anchored by Pro Bowl defensive end Leonard Little, who led the team with 14.5 sacks and recovered a fumble, and defensive end Grant Wistrom, who recorded 9 sacks, 2 interceptions, and 1 fumble recovery. The Rams linebackers unit was led by London Fletcher, who had 4.5 sacks, 2 interceptions, and 4 forced fumbles. St. Louis also had an outstanding secondary, led by Dré Bly (6 interceptions, 150 return yards, and 2 touchdowns), Pro Bowl selection Aeneas Williams (4 interceptions, 69 return yards, 2 touchdowns), and Dexter McCleon (4 interceptions, 66 yards).

The Rams also bested the Patriots in a nationally televised ESPN Sunday night game on November 18 at Foxboro Stadium. Although the Patriots jumped out to an early lead, a critical turnover before the end of the first half that led to a Rams score proved costly. In the second half, the Rams wore the Patriots down and won 24–17. The Rams lost four of their defensive players with injuries. The Patriots' physical play led Rams head coach Mike Martz to say after the game that the Patriots were "a Super Bowl–caliber team."

==== New England Patriots ====
The Patriots' chances for a Super Bowl appearance seemed bleak shortly after the season had begun. Before the season started, quarterbacks coach Dick Rehbein died of a heart attack at age 45. The Patriots, coached by Bill Belichick, lost their first two games, and in their second loss at home to the New York Jets, starting quarterback Drew Bledsoe suffered a sheared blood vessel on a hit by Jets linebacker Mo Lewis that caused him to miss several weeks. His replacement was second-year quarterback Tom Brady, a sixth-round draft pick who had thrown only three passes in 2000. Also, midway through the season, wide receiver Terry Glenn, the team's leading receiver in 2000, was benched due to off-the-field problems. He had been suspended the first four games for failing a drug test and played in just four more before injuries and disputes with the coaching staff caused Belichick to deactivate him for good.

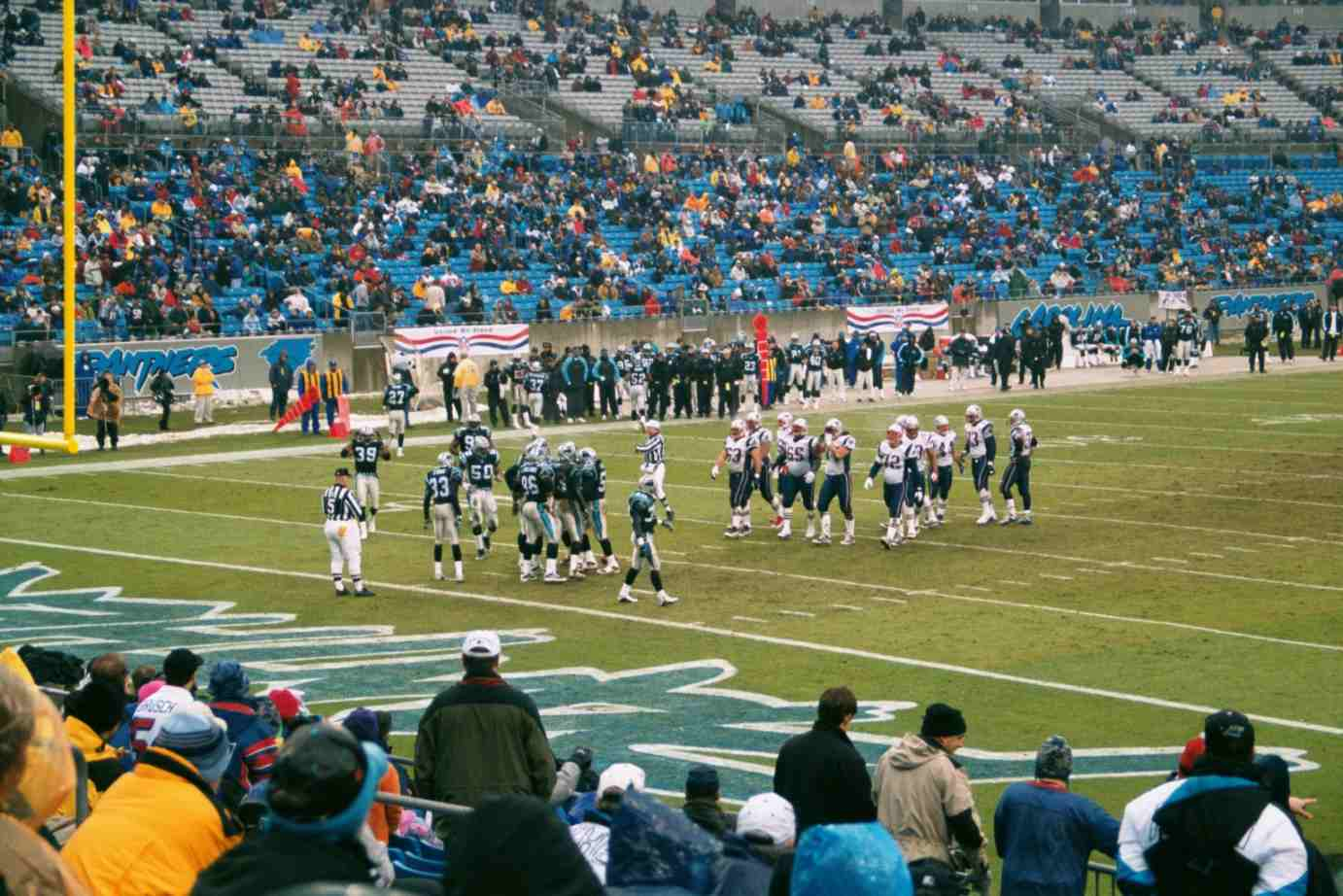
The Patriots on the road at Carolina on January 6, 2002

Upon assuming the role of starting quarterback, Brady enjoyed immediate success in the regular season, leading the Patriots to a 44–13 win over the Indianapolis Colts in his first start and eventually to an 11–5 record. He completed 63.9 percent of his passes for 2,843 yards and 18 touchdowns with 12 interceptions and was selected to the Pro Bowl. Veteran Pro Bowl wide receiver Troy Brown was the main receiving threat, recording 101 receptions for 1,199 yards and 5 touchdowns, while also adding another 413 yards and 2 touchdowns returning punts. His 14.2 yards per punt return average led the NFL. Wide receiver David Patten also was productive, catching 51 passes for 749 yards and 4 touchdowns. Running back Antowain Smith provided the team with a stable running game, rushing for 1,157 yards, catching 19 passes for 192 yards, and scoring 13 touchdowns.

The Patriots were outstanding on defense as well. Up front, linemen Bobby Hamilton (7 sacks, 1 fumble recovery) and rookie Richard Seymour excelled at pressuring quarterbacks and stuffing the run. Behind them, the Patriots had three outstanding linebackers: Mike Vrabel (2 interceptions, 3 sacks), Willie McGinest (5 sacks), and Tedy Bruschi (2 interceptions). The secondary also featured outstanding talent such as defensive back Otis Smith, who led the team with five interceptions for 181 yards and two touchdowns. Cornerback Ty Law intercepted three passes, returning them for 91 yards and two touchdowns. Safety Lawyer Milloy had two interceptions during the season, and was selected along with Law to represent the Patriots' defense in the Pro Bowl. The defense ended the season ranked sixth in scoring, but 24th in total yards allowed. Following their loss to the Rams at home, the Patriots dropped to 5–5, but did not lose again the rest of the season to clinch a first-round bye in the AFC playoffs.

Coincidentally, this was the third straight time that the Patriots' Super Bowl appearance would be at the Louisiana Superdome, joining the Dallas Cowboys as the only teams to play three different Super Bowls in one stadium; the Cowboys had played three at the old Miami Orange Bowl in the 1970s. In their maiden Super Bowl appearance in Super Bowl XX (1986), the Patriots lost 46–10 – the biggest margin of victory in a Super Bowl to that point – to a Chicago Bears team coached by Mike Ditka and including Mike Singletary and Walter Payton. The Patriots returned to the Superdome 11 years later for Super Bowl XXXI but lost 35–21 to a Green Bay Packers team including Brett Favre, Reggie White and Desmond Howard and coached by Mike Holmgren. Milloy, Law, Vinatieri, Bledsoe, McGinest, Bruschi, and Otis Smith were among the players who had played in that game while Belichick had been assistant head coach to Bill Parcells. The Patriots did not appear in a Super Bowl hosted by another city until the team played in Super Bowl XXXVIII two years later in Houston, Texas.

=== Playoffs ===
The Rams began their postseason run with a 45–17 win over the Green Bay Packers in the NFC divisional round. Expected to be a close shootout between Warner and Packers quarterback Brett Favre, the Rams defense dominated the Packers by intercepting a playoff record 6 passes from Favre and returning 3 of them for touchdowns. The Rams offense also racked up 24 points on 2 touchdown passes by Warner, a touchdown run by Faulk, and a field goal by Jeff Wilkins, helping the Rams put the game away by the end of the third quarter.

One week later, the Rams advanced to the Super Bowl with a 29–24 win over the Philadelphia Eagles in the NFC Championship Game. The Eagles managed to build a 17–13 halftime lead, but the Rams scored 16 consecutive second half points (2 touchdown runs by Faulk and a Wilkins field goal) to earn the win, limiting the Eagles to only one touchdown pass in the second half. Warner finished the game with 22 of 33 pass completions for 212 yards and a touchdown, with no interceptions, while Faulk rushed for 159 yards and 2 touchdowns.

In the AFC Divisional Round, the Patriots defeated the Oakland Raiders 16–13 during a raging New England snowstorm in the last game ever played at Foxboro Stadium. The signature moment of the game was a controversial ruling by referee Walt Coleman in the fourth quarter that caused this game to be commonly known as the "Tuck Rule Game." While the Patriots possessed the ball, trailing the Raiders 13–10 with under two minutes left in regulation and no time outs, Brady was sacked by defensive back Charles Woodson, and appeared to fumble the ball. The fumble was recovered by Raiders linebacker Greg Biekert, presumably ending the game with a Raiders victory. After reviewing the play using instant replay, Coleman reversed the call on the field pursuant to the "tuck rule", where a loose ball is ruled an incomplete pass if lost while "tucking" the ball. Most of the controversy centered on whether Brady was still trying to tuck the ball away when he lost control. Brady then led his team to the Raiders' 27-yard line, where kicker Adam Vinatieri made a 45-yard field goal which barely cleared the crossbar to send the game into overtime. The Patriots won the toss in overtime and won on another Vinatieri field goal from 23 yards; per the overtime rules in place at that time. The Raiders' offense never regained possession.

In the AFC Championship Game, the Patriots traveled to Heinz Field to face the Pittsburgh Steelers, who were coming off a 27–10 win over the previous season's Super Bowl champion Baltimore Ravens. The Patriots scored first with a 55-yard punt return touchdown by Brown, but in the second quarter, Brady was knocked out of the game with a sprained ankle. He was replaced by Bledsoe in Bledsoe's first game action since being injured in September. Upon entering the game, Bledsoe quickly moved the Patriots down the field and threw an 11-yard touchdown pass to Patten to give the Patriots a 14–3 halftime lead. Early in the second half, the Steelers moved from their own 32 to the Patriots' 16-yard line, where they lined up for a field goal by Kris Brown. However, Brandon Mitchell blocked the kick, Brown picked up the ball at the 40 and ran 11 yards before lateraling to Antwan Harris, who took it 49 yards for a touchdown that made the score 21–3. But the Steelers scored two third-quarter touchdowns to make the score 21–17. The Patriots ended the comeback attempt by scoring a field goal in the fourth quarter and intercepting two passes from Steelers quarterback Kordell Stewart in the final 3 minutes of the game.

=== Host selection process ===
NFL owners voted to award Super Bowl XXXVI to New Orleans during their October 28, 1998 meeting in Kansas City, Missouri. Two cities made presentations, the other being San Diego (Qualcomm Stadium). San Francisco (Candlestick Park) had planned to pursue XXXVI, but due to logistical complications, withdrew themselves from consideration, and switched their proposal to XXXVII. With only two choices, the league set up a two-round voting system. A city would win if they received 3/4 of the vote during the first round. If neither city won during the first round, the second round would revert to a simple majority. New Orleans won on the second ballot over San Diego in what was described as a "close vote". This was the ninth time that New Orleans hosted the game, and fifth time it would be played in the Superdome.

Immediately after the vote, NFL commissioner Paul Tagliabue made an unexpected and largely unprecedented announcement that San Diego was the favorite to host the next available Super Bowl. With San Francisco tentatively scheduled to host XXXVII in 2003, San Diego was thought likely to host XXXVIII in 2004. However, the league took XXXVII away from San Francisco after plans for a new stadium fell through, and the 2003 game ultimately went to San Diego.

=== Effect of the September 11, 2001, attacks ===
The September 11, 2001, terrorist attacks led the league to postpone its September 16 games and play them a week after the scheduled conclusion of the regular season. This caused the playoffs and Super Bowl to be delayed by one week. Rescheduling Super Bowl XXXVI from January 27 to February 3 proved extraordinarily difficult. In addition to rescheduling the game itself, all related events and activities had to be accommodated. This marked the first time in NFL history that the Super Bowl was played in February; all subsequent Super Bowls (excluding XXXVII in 2003) have been played in February. In turn, this and the games from XXXVIII (2004) to LV (2021) were to now be played on the first Sunday in February. The NFL expanded its season from 16 to 17 regular season games, and LVI (2022) became the first to be played on the second Sunday of the month.

Historically, the NFL made allowance for an open weekend between the Conference Championship games and the Super Bowl. However, there was not one scheduled for 2001, due to the NFL's decision beginning in the 1999 season to move the opening week of games to the weekend after Labor Day. Because the date of the Super Bowl had been set through 2003, the bye week prior to the Super Bowl did not return until 2004.

The NFL and New Orleans officials worked diligently to put together a deal to reschedule the game. The league considered a number of options, including shortening the regular season, shortening the playoffs, condensing the three playoff rounds in two weeks, and moving the game to the Rose Bowl in Pasadena, California. It was eventually decided to make every effort to maintain a full regular season and playoff, and push the Super Bowl back to February 3. Additionally, due to the Super Bowl being moved back a week, the first weekend of New Orleans Mardi Gras parades rolled one week earlier than normal.

One of the most significant logistical challenges was accommodating the National Automobile Dealers Association (NADA) Convention, which was originally slated to occupy the Superdome on February 3. On October 3, 2001, the NFL announced its intentions to hold the game on February 3, even though no agreement had been reached with NADA. Several weeks later, the three parties came to an accord in which the NADA agreed to move its convention date to the original Super Bowl week in exchange for financial and other considerations, including promotional spots shown during selected regular season NFL games. This agreement permitted the NFL to move the game back to February 3, and allowed for a full standard playoff tournament.

External image
- The original logo for Super Bowl XXXVI

The original logo for Super Bowl XXXVI had a style that reflected the host city, and was distributed on some memorabilia items during 2001. However, after the 9/11 attacks, a new logo reflecting American patriotism was designed, featuring the shape of the 48 contiguous states and the American flag colors of red, white, and blue. Rob Tornoe of The Philadelphia Inquirer noted that it had "become one of the most iconic logos in Super Bowl history".

Janet Jackson was originally scheduled to perform during the Halftime Show, but allowed U2 to perform to tribute the events of September 11 (Jackson would perform at the halftime show two years later).

=== Venue ===
This was the final Super Bowl played on the first-generation AstroTurf surface. From 2000 to 2005, NFL stadiums phased out the short-pile AstroTurf in favor of natural grass or other, newer artificial surfaces which closely simulate grass, like FieldTurf.

Prior to Super Bowl XXXVI, Superdome officials considered installing natural grass for the game. The proposed installation method was comparable to what had been used at the Silverdome during the 1994 FIFA World Cup, and at Giants Stadium from 2000 to 2002. The plan called for large trays of grass to be grown and cultivated outdoors, then brought inside the dome and placed on the field for the game. In the end, cost and quality concerns prompted stadium and league officials to abandon the project.

=== Pregame notes ===
The Rams entered as 14-point favorites. This was partly because Rams quarterback Kurt Warner statistically had his best year of his career, with a quarterback rating of 101.4, a 68.7 percent completion rate, and threw for 4,830 yards. Many had believed that the Patriots' Cinderella story was simply a fluke, especially after beating the veteran Oakland Raiders in a controversial playoff game in which a recovered fumble by the Raiders was reversed by the tuck rule.

There had been speculation on whether longtime starter Drew Bledsoe might start the game. As stated above, Bledsoe replaced an injured Brady against the Steelers in the AFC Championship game. Eventually, though, Brady was named starter.

This Super Bowl also meant that Boston and St. Louis would play each other in the championship game or series of all four major North American sports leagues at least once, becoming the first time that that had happened between teams from two specific cities or regions. This was the eighth meeting between teams from Boston and St. Louis for a major professional sports championship overall. Previously,

- In the NHL, the Bruins had swept the Blues in the 1970 Stanley Cup Final with Game 4 being remembered for Bobby Orr's Cup-winning overtime goal that sent him flying.
- In the NBA, the Celtics and Hawks had faced each other in the NBA Finals four times from 1957 to 1961, with the Celtics winning three and the Hawks winning one.
- In MLB, the Cardinals had beaten the Red Sox to win the 1946 and 1967 World Series.

The Patriots, as the designated home team, wore their home nautical blue jerseys and silver pants, while the Rams donned their road white jerseys and New Century Gold pants.

== Broadcasting ==
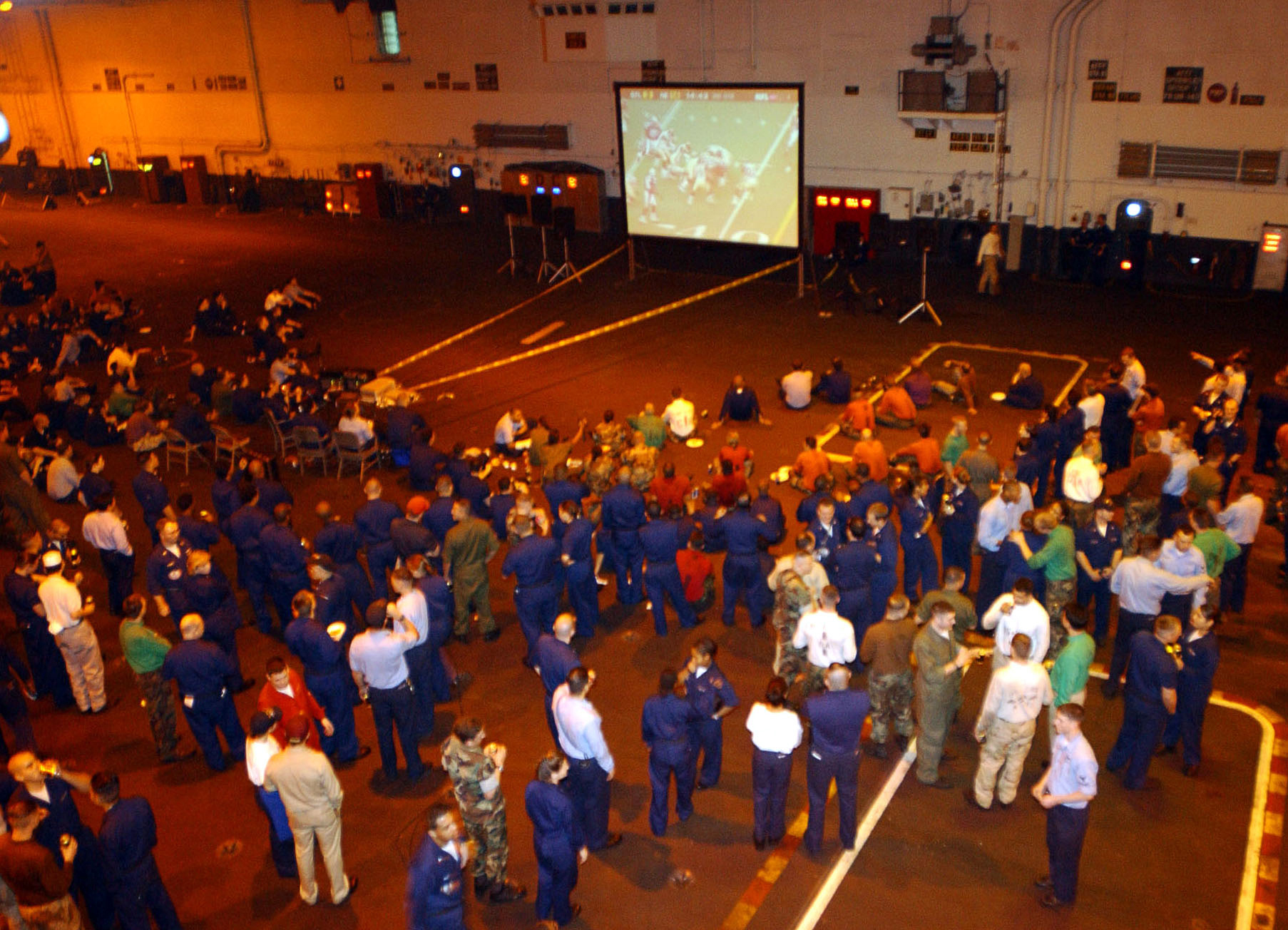
The game is shown aboard the USS John C. Stennis in the Persian Gulf.

The game was broadcast in the United States by Fox. The telecast was presented in a 480p enhanced-definition widescreen format marketed as "Fox Widescreen". While promoted as having higher quality than standard-definition, and being the first widescreen sports telecast on U.S. television to use a singular telecast for all viewers (rather than using a separate production exclusive to the widescreen feed), it was not true high definition, but still matched the aspect ratio of HDTV sets.

The game was called by play-by-play announcer Pat Summerall and color commentator John Madden. Pam Oliver and Ron Pitts served as sideline reporters. This was Summerall's 16th and final Super Bowl broadcast on television or radio (and his 11th doing play by play). It was also the eighth and final Super Bowl telecast, and final NFL telecast of any kind, for the Summerall and Madden announcing team. The two had become the NFL's most famous broadcast duo since they were paired together in 1981 on CBS. After this game, Summerall retired from broadcasting and Madden moved to ABC's Monday Night Football. As a result, Madden was the first person to announce Super Bowls on different networks in consecutive years when he called Super Bowl XXXVII on ABC with Al Michaels.

James Brown hosted all the events with help from his fellow Fox NFL Sunday cast members Terry Bradshaw, Howie Long, and Cris Collinsworth. Jillian Barberie served as the weather and entertainment reporter during the pre-game show.

=== Advertising ===
Memorable television commercials that aired during the game included Columbia Pictures' trailer for Spider-Man, Budweiser's "Picking a Card", and Super Bowl Ad Meter commercial of the year winners Bud Light "Satin Sheets." The best commercial of the year from Adbowl M&M's "Chocolate on our Pillow or Hotel Check In" and EA Sports' Madden NFL 2002, which aired during the game three days after Madden NFL 2002 started selling in Japan by Electronic Arts Square.

== Entertainment ==
=== Pregame ===
Before the game, an ensemble of singers featured Barry Manilow, Yolanda Adams, James Ingram, Wynonna Judd, and Patti LaBelle performing Manilow's song "Let Freedom Ring."

In a video segment, past and present NFL players read excerpts from the Declaration of Independence, which has become a part of all subsequent Super Bowls carried by Fox Sports. Super Bowls XXXIX, XLII, and XLV used different active and former players (and a player's widow) reading the Declaration for each version. Former U.S. presidents Gerald Ford, Jimmy Carter, George H. W. Bush, and Bill Clinton appeared in another videotaped segment and recited some of the speeches by Abraham Lincoln. Because Ronald Reagan had Alzheimer's disease, his wife Nancy appeared on the segment in place of him accompanied by Aaron Copland's Lincoln Portrait performed by the Boston Pops Orchestra under the direction of maestro Keith Lockhart.

Singers Mary J. Blige and Marc Anthony, along with the Boston Pops, performed "America the Beautiful". Paul McCartney then sang his post-9/11 song "Freedom". Afterwards, singer Mariah Carey, accompanied by the Boston Pops, performed the national anthem. At the conclusion of the anthem was a flyover of a formation of F-15 Eagles and F-16 Fighting Falcons from the U.S. Air Force in honor of first responders and service members.

George H. W. Bush became the first president, past or present, to participate in a Super Bowl coin toss in person (Ronald Reagan participated in the Super Bowl XIX coin toss via satellite from the White House in 1985). Bush was joined by former Dallas Cowboys Hall of Fame quarterback Roger Staubach. Staubach played at the United States Naval Academy and was the Most Valuable Player of Super Bowl VI, which was played 30 years prior at New Orleans' Tulane Stadium.

=== Patriots entrance into the Superdome ===
As was customary at the time, the Rams' individual offensive starters were introduced first, as the Rams were considered the visitors. However, when it came time to introduce the Patriots' starters, Pat Summerall, making the public address announcement, revealed that the Patriots chose "to be introduced as a team." According to David Halberstam's book, The Education of a Coach, Belichick was given a choice by the NFL to introduce either the offense or defense. Belichick chose neither, asking that the team be introduced all at once in the spirit of unity. Although this was initially rejected by the NFL, Belichick held his ground and the NFL honored his request. The full team introduction demonstrated solidarity, and struck a chord with the audience in the wake of the 9/11 attacks. Since the next Super Bowl game, both Super Bowl participants have been introduced collectively as a team, a precedent which has continued.

=== Halftime ===
The halftime show featured a three-song set from Irish rock band U2, who had just completed their successful Elevation Tour. After a rendition of "Beautiful Day", the band played "MLK" and "Where the Streets Have No Name" as the names of the victims from the September 11 attacks were projected onto a sheet behind the stage. While singing "Where the Streets Have No Name", the group's lead singer Bono replaced the lyrics "take shelter from the poison rain" with "dance in the Louisiana rain", "high on a desert plain" with "where there's no sorrow or pain", and the final line "it's all I can do" with "it's all we can do". At the conclusion of the song, Bono opened his jacket to reveal an American flag printed into the lining. U2's halftime show captivated the audience as a poignant tribute to those who had been lost in the attacks. In 2013, SI.com ranked it as the best halftime show in Super Bowl history, while it was rated the second-greatest by Askmen.com.

Janet Jackson was originally selected to perform during the Halftime Show, but due to traveling concerns following the September 11 tragedies, the NFL opted for other acts. The NFL thought U2 would "set the right tone" in respect to the tragedy, after executives attended the band's Elevation Tour in New York City. She performed for the Super Bowl halftime two years later, when her highly controversial Super Bowl Halftime Show performance incident occurred.

== Game summary ==
External videos
- Full game broadcast on Fox on YouTube

=== First quarter ===
After the teams exchanged punts to start the game, the Rams scored first, with quarterback Kurt Warner completing six of seven passes for 43 yards on a 48-yard, 10-play drive to set up a 50-yard field goal by kicker Jeff Wilkins, giving the Rams a 3–0 lead. At the time, the field goal was the third longest in Super Bowl history. While the rest of the quarter was scoreless, the Patriots were stifling the typically high-powered Rams offense by playing physical man coverage with the Rams; receivers, forcing them into long drives that would end in punts or field goal attempts.

=== Second quarter ===
Early in the second quarter, the Rams drove to the Patriots' 34-yard line, aided by Warner's 29-yard completion to wide receiver Az-Zahir Hakim on 3rd-and-15, but Wilkins' 52-yard field goal attempt sailed wide left.

On the Rams' next possession, with 8:49 left in the half, a blitz by linebacker Mike Vrabel led Warner to be intercepted by cornerback Ty Law on a pass intended for wide receiver Isaac Bruce. Law then returned the interception 47 yards for a touchdown to give the Patriots a 7–3 lead. After another exchange of punts, with less than two minutes left in the first half, Warner completed a 15-yard pass to wide receiver Ricky Proehl at the Rams' 40-yard line, but safety Antwan Harris forced a fumble on Proehl, and cornerback Terrell Buckley recovered the ball for the Patriots. Quarterback Tom Brady started off the Patriots' drive with a 16-yard completion to wide receiver Troy Brown and finished it with an 8-yard touchdown pass to wide receiver David Patten with 31 seconds left in the half. By halftime, the Patriots owned a surprising 14–3 lead. It was the first time in the entire 2001 season that the Rams fell behind by more than eight points in a game.

=== Third quarter ===
The Patriots received the opening kickoff of the second half, but could only reach the Rams' 43-yard line before being forced to punt. Aided by a 20-yard reception by Hakim, a 22-yard reception by Bruce, and a pass interference penalty on cornerback Otis Smith, the Rams advanced to the Patriots' 41-yard line. However, on the next play, Vrabel and defensive tackle Richard Seymour sacked Warner for a 9-yard loss. Warner then threw two consecutive incompletions, which resulted in the Rams punting.

On the Rams' next possession, they reached the New England 45-yard line on three runs for 30 yards by running back Marshall Faulk, but Smith intercepted a pass intended for Rams wide receiver Torry Holt, who slipped while coming off the line of scrimmage, as Smith returned the ball 30 yards to the Rams' 33-yard line. The Patriots were only able to advance the ball 14 yards after the turnover, so kicker Adam Vinatieri made a 37-yard field goal to increase their lead to 17–3.

=== Fourth quarter ===
The Rams responded by driving to the Patriots' 3-yard line on their ensuing drive, which was highlighted by Warner's 15-yard pass to Bruce, two receptions by Faulk for 29 yards, and a 14-yard reception by Hakim. After Warner threw back-to-back incompletions, he went back to pass on fourth down, but scrambled to his right after seeing no one open and attempted to score himself. Warner fumbled the ball while being tackled by linebacker Roman Phifer, and safety Tebucky Jones returned the fumble 97 yards for a touchdown, but the play was nullified by a holding penalty on linebacker Willie McGinest, who illegally hugged Faulk, giving the Rams a new set of downs on the 1-yard line. Two plays later, Warner scored on a 2-yard touchdown run to cut the Patriots' lead to 17–10.

After Warner's touchdown, the Rams' defense forced the Patriots to a three-and-out. The Rams then drove from their own 7-yard line to the Patriots' 36-yard line, aided by a 30-yard reception by Proehl. However, McGinest sacked Warner for a 16-yard loss on second down, pushing the Rams back to their own 46-yard line. The Rams punted after Warner's third down pass was incomplete.

==== Final two minutes ====
With the Rams trailing 17–10 in the final two minutes, they forced the Patriots to another three-and-out, and got the ball back on their own 45-yard line with 1:51 left in the game and no timeouts. Warner threw three consecutive completions to three different receivers — an 18-yard pass to Hakim, an 11-yard pass to wide receiver Yo Murphy, and finally a 26-yard touchdown completion to Proehl that tied the game, 17–17, with 1:30 left in regulation.

The Patriots also had no timeouts left for their ensuing drive, which led Fox color commentator John Madden to initially suggest that the Patriots should run out the clock and attempt to win in overtime. Instead, the Patriots attempted to get the winning score in regulation on the final drive. Bill Belichick conferred with offensive coordinator Charlie Weis and they agreed to go for it. Belichick later stated, "With a quarterback like Brady, going for the win is not that dangerous, because he's not going to make a mistake." Brady opened the drive with three dump-off completions to running back J. R. Redmond for 24 yards, who got out of bounds on the last one and moved the ball to their own 41-yard line with 33 seconds left. At this point, Madden admitted on the air that he now liked what the Patriots were doing. After an incomplete pass, Brady completed a 23-yard pass underneath the Rams' zone defense to wide receiver Troy Brown (Brady's longest pass completion of the game), who also got out of bounds, and followed it up with a 6-yard completion to tight end Jermaine Wiggins to advance to the Rams' 30-yard line. Brady then spiked the ball with seven seconds left, which set up Vinatieri's 48-yard field goal attempt. Vinatieri, who had never missed a field goal indoors, made the kick as time expired, giving the Patriots their first-ever Super Bowl title. It marked the first time in Super Bowl history that the game was won by a score on the final play and only the second game where a field goal was decisive, with the first being in Super Bowl V when the Baltimore Colts' Jim O'Brien kicked a 32-yard field goal with nine seconds left to defeat the Dallas Cowboys. With the victory, Brady became at the time the youngest quarterback to win a Super Bowl surpassing Joe Namath. (Namath was 25 years, 7 months and 12 days old when he won Super Bowl III while Brady was 24 years and 6 months old.)

Is it Adam Vinatieri or Scott Norwood? Placement down by Walter, Vinatieri's field goal try for the win...(Color commentator Boomer Esiason: "Good!")...is good! It's good! It's good! And the New England Patriots have won Super Bowl XXXVI!

— Howard David's call of the winning field goal on Westwood One

...From the far hash mark, angle to the left for Adam Vinatieri - 48-yard field goal attempt. Snap, ball down, kick up. Kick is on the way and it is...Good! It's good! It's good! Adam Vinatieri boots a 48-yard field goal, and the game is over, and the Patriots are Super Bowl champions! The Patriots are Super Bowl champions - the best team in the National Football League!

— Gil Santos' call of the winning field goal on the Patriots radio broadcast on WBCN in Boston

Here comes one of greater importance if he makes it. And it's right down the pike. Adam Vinatieri...no time on the clock and the Patriots have won Super Bowl XXXVI. Unbelievable.

— Pat Summerall's call of Vinatieri's game-winning field goal on Fox

=== Box score ===
Super Bowl XXXVI: New England Patriots 20, St. Louis Rams 17

Quarter	1	2	3	4	Total
Rams (NFC)	3	0	0	14	17
Patriots (AFC)	0	14	3	3	20

at Louisiana Superdome, New Orleans, Louisiana

- Date: February 3, 2002
- Game time: 5:30 p.m. CST
- Game weather: 72 °F (22 °C), played indoors, domed stadium

Scoring summary

Quarter	Time	Drive			Team	Scoring information	Score	
Quarter	Time	Plays	Yards	TOP	Team	Scoring information	STL	NE
1	3:10	10	48	5:05	STL	50-yard field goal by Jeff Wilkins	3	0
2	8:49	—	—	—	NE	Interception returned 47 yards for touchdown by Ty Law, Adam Vinatieri kick good	3	7
2	0:31	5	40	0:49	NE	David Patten 8-yard touchdown reception from Tom Brady, Vinatieri kick good	3	14
3	1:18	5	14	2:07	NE	37-yard field goal by Vinatieri	3	17
4	9:31	12	77	6:47	STL	Kurt Warner 2-yard touchdown run, Wilkins kick good	10	17
4	1:30	3	55	0:21	STL	Ricky Proehl 26-yard touchdown reception from Warner, Wilkins kick good	17	17
4	0:00	9	53	1:21	NE	48-yard field goal by Vinatieri	17	20
"TOP" = time of possession. For other American football terms, see Glossary of American football.							17	20

=== Statistical overview ===
Warner finished the game with 28 completions out of 44 passes for 365 yards, 1 touchdown, and 2 interceptions, and rushed 3 times for 6 yards and a touchdown. Warner's 365 passing yards were the second highest total in Super Bowl history behind his own record of 414 yards set in Super Bowl XXXIV. Hakim was the top receiver of the game with 5 catches for 90 yards, and also rushed once for 5 yards. Faulk led the team with 76 rushing yards, and also caught 4 passes for 54 yards.

Patriots running back Antowain Smith was the top rusher of the game with 92 yards, and caught a pass for 4 yards. Troy Brown was the Patriots' leading receiver with 6 catches for 89 yards. Brown also had a 15-yard kickoff return, and a 4-yard punt return, which gave him 108 total yards. Although the Rams outgained the Patriots 427–267 in total yards, the Patriots forced three turnovers that were converted into 17 points. The Patriots, on the other hand, committed no turnovers.

=== Records ===
- Kurt Warner's 365 passing yards was the second-highest total in Super Bowl history, behind his own previous record of 414 yards set in Super Bowl XXXIV. It was later surpassed by Tom Brady's 462 yards in Super Bowl LI and 505 passing yards in Super Bowl LII.
- This was the commonwealth of Massachusetts' and the region of New England's first major professional championship since the Boston Celtics' NBA title in 1986. New England's teams lost a Super Bowl, an NBA Finals, a World Series and two Stanley Cup Finals in the drought stretch.
- The Rams' fourth-quarter comeback of 14 points became the largest in Super Bowl history for a team to tie or take the lead in the fourth quarter, until surpassed by the Patriots' comeback from 25 points down in Super Bowl LI. Also this was the second time a team down 10 or more points in the 4th quarter had tied the game, the other being the Titans against the Rams two years earlier in Super Bowl XXXIV.
- The Patriots are the second team to have worn three different color jerseys in the Super Bowl: red in Super Bowl XX; white in Super Bowl XXXI, Super Bowl XXXIX, Super Bowl XLIX, Super Bowl LI, Super Bowl LII, Super Bowl LIII, and Super Bowl LX; and blue in Super Bowl XXXVI, Super Bowl XXXVIII, Super Bowl XLII, and Super Bowl XLVI. (Denver Broncos wore orange in Super Bowl XII, Super Bowl XXII, Super Bowl XXIV and Super Bowl XLVIII; blue in Super Bowl XXXII; and white in Super Bowl XXI, Super Bowl XXXIII and Super Bowl 50.)
- The Patriots were the second biggest Super Bowl underdog to win behind only the Jets in Super Bowl III, who were underdogs against the Colts by 19 1/2 points.

== Final statistics ==
Sources: NFL.com Super Bowl XXXVI, Super Bowl XXXVI Play Finder NE, Super Bowl XXXVI Play Finder StL

=== Statistical comparison ===
	St. Louis Rams	New England Patriots
First downs	26	15
First downs rushing	7	6
First downs passing	16	8
First downs penalty	3	1
Third down efficiency	5/13	2/11
Fourth down efficiency	0/0	0/0
Net yards rushing	90	133
Rushing attempts	22	25
Yards per rush	4.1	5.3
Passing – Completions-attempts	28/44	16/27
Times sacked-total yards	3–28	2–11
Interceptions thrown	2	0
Net yards passing	337	134
Total net yards	427	267
Punt returns-total yards	3–6	1–4
Kickoff returns-total yards	4–82	4–100
Interceptions-total return yards	0–0	2–77
Punts-average yardage	4–39.8	8–43.1
Fumbles-lost	2–1	0–0
Penalties-yards	6–39	5–31
Time of possession	33:30	26:30
Turnovers	3	0

=== Individual statistics ===
Rams passing
	C/ATT^{1}	Yds	TD	INT	Rating
Kurt Warner	28/44	365	1	2	78.3
Rams rushing
	Car^{2}	Yds	TD	LG^{3}	Yds/Car
Marshall Faulk	17	76	0	15	4.5
Kurt Warner	3	6	1	5	2.0
Az-Zahir Hakim	1	5	0	5	5.0
James Hodgins	1	3	0	3	3.0
Rams receiving
	Rec^{4}	Yds	TD	LG^{3}	Target^{5}
Az-Zahir Hakim	5	90	0	29	8
Isaac Bruce	5	56	0	22	7
Torry Holt	5	49	0	18	12
Marshall Faulk	4	54	0	22	4
Ricky Proehl	3	71	1	30	5
Jeff Robinson	2	18	0	12	2
Ernie Conwell	2	8	0	9	3
Yo Murphy	1	11	0	11	1
James Hodgins	1	8	0	8	1

Patriots passing
	C/ATT^{1}	Yds	TD	INT	Rating
Tom Brady	16/27	145	1	0	86.2
Patriots rushing
	Car^{2}	Yds	TD	LG^{3}	Yds/Car
Antowain Smith	18	92	0	17	5.1
David Patten	1	22	0	22	22.0
Kevin Faulk	2	15	0	8	7.5
Marc Edwards	2	5	0	3	2.5
Tom Brady	1	3	0	3	3.0
J. R. Redmond	1	–4	0	–4	–4.0
Patriots receiving
	Rec^{4}	Yds	TD	LG^{3}	Target^{5}
Troy Brown	6	89	0	23	6
J. R. Redmond	3	24	0	11	3
Jermaine Wiggins	2	14	0	8	4
Marc Edwards	2	7	0	5	2
David Patten	1	8	1	8	4
Antowain Smith	1	4	0	4	1
Kevin Faulk	1	–1	0	–1	2
Patrick Pass	0	0	0	0	1

^{1}Completions/attempts ^{2}Carries ^{3}Long gain ^{4}Receptions ^{5}Times targeted

=== Records set ===
The following records were set in Super Bowl XXXVI, according to the official NFL.com boxscore, the 2022 NFL Record & Fact Book and the Pro-Football-Reference.com game summary.

Player Records Tied
Most fumbles recovered, career	2	Kurt Warner (St. Louis)
Most field goals attempted, career	6	Jeff Wilkins (St. Louis)
Most interceptions returned for touchdown, game	1	Ty Law (New England)

Team Records Set
Most yards allowed in a win	427	Patriots
Fewest rushing attempts, both team totals	47	Patriots (25); Rams (22)
Records tied
Fewest rushing touchdowns scored, game	0	Patriots
Fewest turnovers, game	0	Patriots
Most touchdowns scored by interception return, game	1	Patriots

== Starting lineups ==
Hall of Fame ‡

St. Louis	Position	Position	New England
Offense
Torry Holt	WR		Troy Brown
Orlando Pace‡	LT		Matt Light
Tom Nütten	LG		Mike Compton
Andy McCollum	C		Damien Woody
Adam Timmerman	RG		Joe Andruzzi
Rod Jones	RT		Greg Randall
Ernie Conwell	TE		Jermaine Wiggins
Isaac Bruce‡	WR		David Patten
Kurt Warner‡	QB		Tom Brady
Marshall Faulk‡	RB		Antowain Smith
Jeff Robinson	TE	FB	Marc Edwards
Defense
Chidi Ahanotu	LE		Bobby Hamilton
Brian Young	LDT	DT	Brandon Mitchell
Jeff Zgonina	RDT	DT	Richard Seymour‡
Grant Wistrom	RE		Anthony Pleasant
Don Davis	LLB		Mike Vrabel
London Fletcher	MLB		Tedy Bruschi
Tommy Polley	RLB		Roman Phifer
Aeneas Williams‡	LCB		Ty Law‡
Dexter McCleon	RCB		Otis Smith
Adam Archuleta	SS		Lawyer Milloy
Kim Herring	FS		Tebucky Jones

== Aftermath ==
=== Patriots ===
Four hours after the game ended, Tom Brady visited Bill Belichick's hotel room where, as per team rules, he had to get Belichick's permission to miss the team flight and instead travel to Walt Disney World in Orlando. Belichick gave him a perplexed look, and after a few seconds of dead silence, responded, "Of course you can go. How many times do you win the Super Bowl?"

The game heralded the Patriots dynasty, being the first of nine Super Bowl appearances under the duo of head coach Belichick and quarterback Brady. The Patriots finished the 2002 NFL season 9–7, missing the playoffs. They went on to win Super Bowl XXXVIII, then Super Bowl XXXIX, thus winning three Super Bowls in four years. Then, they won their fourth, fifth, and sixth Super Bowls (Super Bowl XLIX, Super Bowl LI, and Super Bowl LIII) a decade after their third. Brady won four more Super Bowl MVP awards – three with the Patriots in Super Bowl XXXVIII, Super Bowl XLIX, and Super Bowl LI and one more with the Tampa Bay Buccaneers in Super Bowl LV – making him the only player to be named Super Bowl MVP five times.

Super Bowl XXXVI later became part of the wider 2007 New England Patriots videotaping controversy, also known as "Spygate". In addition to other videotaping allegations, the Boston Herald reported, citing an unnamed source, that the Patriots had also taped the Rams' walkthrough practice prior to the game. After further investigations, the league determined that no tape of the Rams' Super Bowl walkthrough was made, and the Herald later issued an apology in 2008 for their article about the alleged walkthrough tape. Nevertheless, the Patriots finished the 2007 regular season with a perfect 16–0 record, but failed to record an undefeated 19–0 championship season after losing Super Bowl XLII to the New York Giants. And at the conclusion of the 2015 NFL season, the Patriots held the NFL's best record since Spygate, compiling a 96–32 record from 2008 to 2015.

The fans of New England have been waiting 42 years for this day. Spirituality, faith and democracy are the cornerstones of our country. We are all Patriots, and tonight, the Patriots are world champions.

— Patriots owner Robert Kraft accepting the Vince Lombardi Trophy

Sitting behind me, an older Patriots fan had turned bright red -- I couldn't tell whether he was laughing, crying or both -- and he was screaming, "Fifty years! I've been waiting for this for fifty years!" and "They gave us no respect! None!" And he just kept screaming those things again and again. And again. And again. Meanwhile, the other Patriots fans in our section were hugging one another and carrying on -- none of us knew what to do. We were collectively incredulous. Total disbelief. Nobody could ever make jokes about the Patriots again. We had arrived.

— Bill Simmons, who watched the game live at the Superdome, in his postgame column for ESPN Page 2

The Patriots' win in this Super Bowl, beyond just serving as a springboard to a dynasty that lasted nearly two decades and resulted in five more championships, also became the starting point for a decade of success in Boston sports, with the city's teams in the four major North American sports leagues (the Red Sox, Celtics and Bruins in addition to the Patriots) winning seven championships including at least one each. Following the Bruins winning the 2011 Stanley Cup Finals, Boston Globe columnist Dan Shaughnessy ranked all seven championships from the past decade and ranked the Patriots winning Super Bowl XXXVI as the second-greatest Boston sports championship of the decade behind only the Red Sox winning the 2004 World Series and breaking the "Curse of the Bambino".

Brady, Milloy and Vinatieri also provided the team's commentary in the 2001 Patriots' episode of America's Game: The Super Bowl Champions, narrated by actor Martin Sheen.

The Patriots winning their first championship in franchise history started a run of a team in American sports from NCAA Football and Basketball and the four major sports (MLB baseball, NFL football, NBA basketball, and NHL hockey) winning either their first franchise championship or their next franchise championship after waiting at least 17 years since their last title. This streak is still continuing in 2026 after Major League Baseball's Milwaukee Brewers won the 2026 World Series for their first championship in their franchise history.

=== Rams ===
Beginning with the Rams' appearance in Super Bowl XXXVI, 10 different NFC teams appeared in the Super Bowl over the next 10 years. This trend was broken when the New York Giants earned a trip to Super Bowl XLVI after participating in Super Bowl XLII four years earlier (the Giants defeated the Patriots in both games).

This game was regarded as a "Super Bowl hangover" for the Rams because they lost a Super Bowl where they were heavy favorites, with a win potentially ushering in a Rams dynasty, but instead the loss signaled the beginning of the end of The Greatest Show on Turf era. Due to injuries to Kurt Warner and Marshall Faulk, the Rams finished with a 7–9 record the following year and missed the postseason. They qualified for the playoffs only two more times (2003 and 2004), and only won one more playoff game (the 2004–05 wild card game) during the remainder of their tenure in St. Louis. Head coach Mike Martz was fired after missing most of the 2005 season due to illness. Warner suffered a concussion on opening day in 2003, and was later demoted to backup quarterback for the rest of that season. He then signed with the New York Giants in 2004 as a caretaker quarterback, eventually losing the starting job to rookie quarterback Eli Manning. Warner later joined the Arizona Cardinals in 2005 and eventually gained the starting job where he led that team to their first Super Bowl appearance, XLIII, following the 2008 season.

Super Bowl XXXVI ended up being the last Super Bowl that the Rams participated while based in St. Louis; they relocated back to Los Angeles in 2016. The Rams would once again reach the Super Bowl in the 2018 season and 2021 season, winning the latter.

=== Super Bowl LIII rematch ===
The Patriots and the now Los Angeles Rams rematched exactly 17 years later in Super Bowl LIII (2019); again featuring the head coach-quarterback tandem of Bill Belichick and Tom Brady, both of whom were the only active personnel left from Super Bowl XXXVI, on February 3, 2019. Coincidentally like XXXVI, LIII also featured one of the league's top offenses (Rams) against one of the top defenses (Patriots). The Patriots won their record-tying sixth Super Bowl by defeating the Rams again 13–3, with Brady remarking that LIII had a "throwback feel" to XXXVI. Meanwhile, the Rams would defeat the Cincinnati Bengals three years later in Super Bowl LVI, earning their second championship.

== Officials ==
- Referee: Bernie Kukar #86 second Super Bowl (XXXIII)
- Umpire: Jeff Rice #44 first Super Bowl
- Head linesman: Mark Hittner #28 first Super Bowl
- Line judge: Ron Phares #10 third Super Bowl (XXVIII, XXIX)
- Field judge: Pete Morelli #135 first Super Bowl
- Side judge: Laird Hayes #125 first Super Bowl
- Back judge: Scott Green #19 first Super Bowl
- Alternate referee: Mike Carey #94 (referee for Super Bowl XLII)
- Alternate umpire: Ron Botchan #110 (umpire for XX, XXVII, XXIX, XXI, XXXIV)
