= Tuck rule =

Tuck rule may refer to:

- Tuck rule (American football)
  - Tuck Rule Game, the 2001 AFC Divisional Playoff game between the New England Patriots and the Oakland Raiders
- Tuck rule (ice hockey)
