= Walt Coleman =

American football official (born 1952)

Walt Coleman III
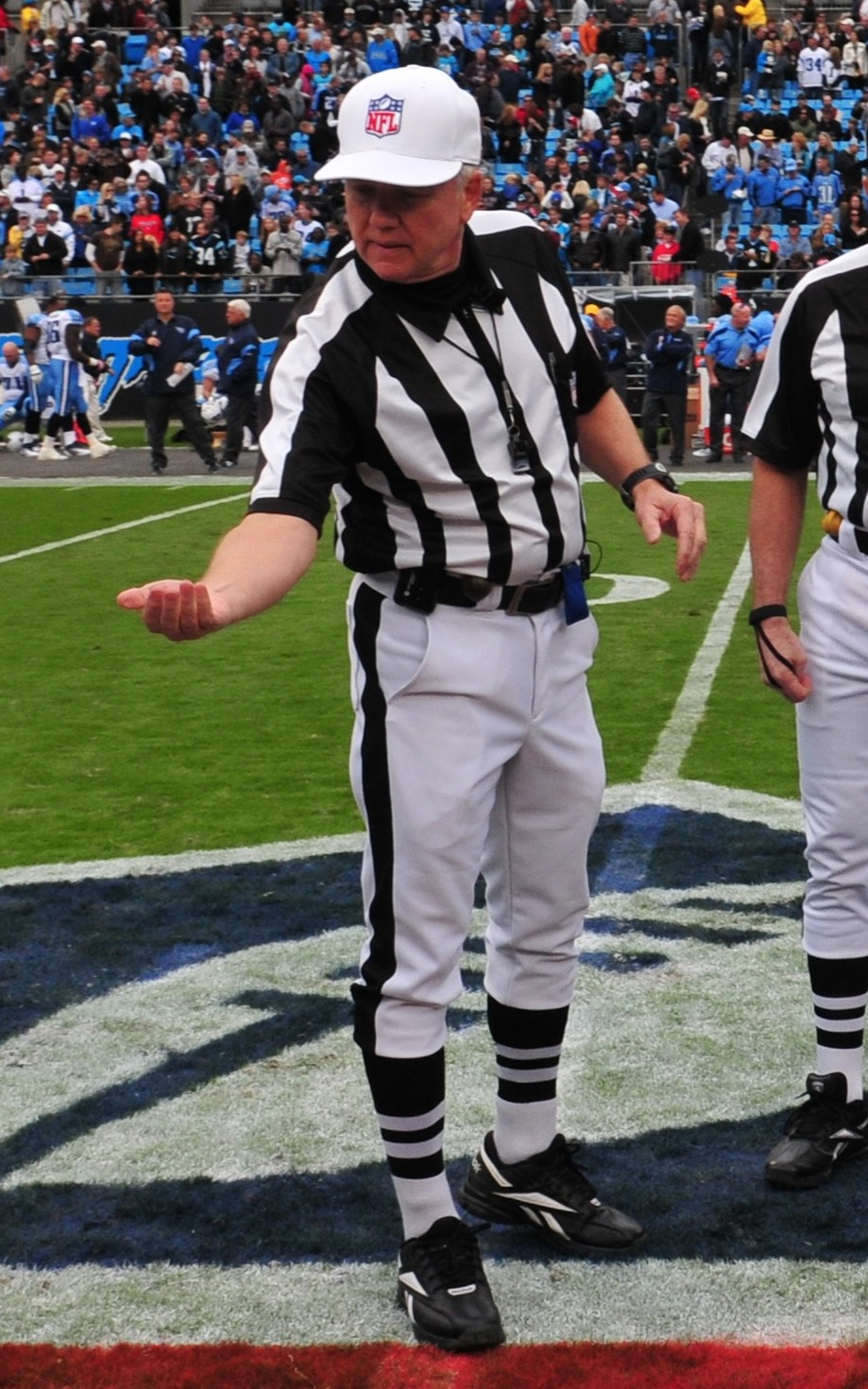
- Coleman at Bank of America Stadium in 2011
- Born: January 16, 1952 (age 74); Little Rock, Arkansas, U.S.
- Occupation: NFL official (1989–2018)

Walt Coleman III (born January 16, 1952) is a former American football official who officiated in the National Football League (NFL) from the 1989 season until the end of the 2018 season. He wore uniform number 65. During his final season in 2018, Coleman was the NFL's longest current tenured referee.

== Officiating career ==
=== Early years ===
Coleman worked for the Arkansas Activities Association, the governing body for high school athletics in Arkansas, for 14 years before moving up to the college level. His college officiating career included five years in the Southland Conference (Division I-AA) and five years in the Southwest Conference (Division I-A). He was never promoted to referee during his college officiating career since he could not justify heading a crew with his five years experience in each conference.

=== National Football League ===
Coleman served as a line judge for the first six seasons before being promoted to referee at the start of the 1995 NFL season when Dale Hamer was forced to sit out that season after undergoing open-heart surgery. Mike Carey had been promoted to referee when the NFL added another crew for the 1995 season in anticipation of the arrival of expansion franchises Carolina and Jacksonville.

Coleman's NFL officiating crew in 2018, his final season, consisted of umpire Jeff Rice, down judge Jerry Bergman, line judge Mark Stewart, field judge Greg Gautreaux, side judge Jabir Walker, back judge Greg Yette, replay official Darryll Lewis, and replay assistant Saleem Choudhry.

Coleman's final NFL game as referee was the 2019 Pro Bowl in Orlando, Florida, along with Pete Morelli. They both retired after that game. After his last regular-season game, which involved the Patriots, the team awarded Coleman a game ball.

Over his NFL career, Coleman worked two conference championship games (1998 and 2003) and was the alternate referee for Super Bowls XXXIV, XLII, and LI.

==== Notable games ====
Coleman made an instant replay call on January 19, 2002, in a game that led to its moniker as the "Tuck Rule Game". With 1:47 left, Oakland cornerback Charles Woodson knocked the ball from New England's quarterback Tom Brady. It was recovered by Oakland linebacker Greg Biekert. The play was originally called a fumble. Coleman reviewed the play and overturned the fumble call to an incomplete pass using the tuck rule, which said that "any intentional forward movement of [the thrower's] arm starts a forward pass, even if the player loses possession of the ball as he is attempting to tuck it back toward his body." The call was a big factor in helping launch the Patriots dynasty, as they would go on to win Super Bowl XXXVI during the same postseason. In March 2013, league owners voted 29–1, with Patriots owner Robert Kraft abstaining, to abolish the rule. Coleman never officiated another Raiders game the rest of his career.

Coleman was the head official in the 2003 AFC Championship Game between the New England Patriots and Indianapolis Colts. Colts players later publicly complained that the officials did not properly call illegal contact, pass interference, and defensive holding penalties on the Patriots' defensive backs. This, and similar complaints made by other NFL teams during that season, would prompt the NFL during the 2004 offseason to instruct all of the league's officials to strictly enforce these types of fouls (the "chuck" rule).

Coleman officiated the 2012 Thanksgiving Day game between the Houston Texans and Detroit Lions. Houston running back Justin Forsett ran in an 81-yard touchdown, but replays indicated that Forsett was down by contact after a short gain. Detroit head coach Jim Schwartz threw the challenge flag before he was entitled to, which negated the automatic review that would have overturned the call. Mike Pereira wrote that he would favor a rule change to make this just a 15-yard penalty for unsportsmanlike behavior, but still allow the review. (That rule would eventually be passed.)

== Personal life ==
Coleman resides in the Mabelvale neighborhood of Little Rock, Arkansas, and is the manager of Coleman Dairy, which dates back to the 1860s and was acquired by Hiland Dairy in 2007.

Coleman's son, Walt Coleman IV, joined the NFL as an official in the 2015 season. His father, Walt "Buddy" Coleman II, refereed in the Southwest Conference. Coleman was inducted into the Arkansas Sports Hall of Fame in 2009, joining his father, a 1994 inductee.

Outside of officiating, Coleman serves on many local boards and associations including the Little Rock Boys and Girls Club and Greater Little Rock YMCA. Coleman is a former president of the Arkansas Dairy Products Association and Major Sports Association of the Little Rock Regional Chamber of Commerce.

== See also ==
- List of National Football League officials
