= Super Bowl XXXVII halftime show =

- Part of: Super Bowl XXXVII
- Date: January 26, 2003
- Location: San Diego, California, United States
- Venue: Qualcomm Stadium
- Headliner: Shania Twain; No Doubt
- Special guests: Sting
- Sponsor: AT&T Wireless
- Producer: Jimmy Iovine and Joel Gallen

Super Bowl halftime show chronology
XXXVI (2002)	XXXVII (2003)	XXXVIII (2004)

The Super Bowl XXXVII halftime show took place on January 26, 2003 at Qualcomm Stadium in San Diego, California, as part of Super Bowl XXXVII. Shania Twain, No Doubt, and Sting were featured in the show, sponsored by AT&T Wireless.

== Production ==
The show was produced by Jimmy Iovine and Joel Gallen and was sponsored by AT&T Wireless.

Shania Twain's inclusion was announced by the NFL in early January. No Doubt then announced their inclusion the following day on their website. Ahead of the show, the producers promised that there would not be lip syncing. Speculation arose following the show that Twain lip synced her part of the performance. The show's sound producer, Paul Liszewski, claimed that Twain had sung live, but that her backing band and Twain's backing vocals were prerecorded. However, Twain later admitted that her main vocals had also been prerecorded due to concerns over sound quality.

Twain became the first artist to have performed both the Grey Cup and Super Bowl halftime shows, having already performed the halftime show at the 90th Grey Cup months earlier.

As of 2025, Twain's performance marks the last time that a country music act has performed in a Super Bowl halftime show.

== Synopsis ==
Twain began the show by singing her song "Man! I Feel Like a Woman!". She next performed her song "Up!" which was new at the time. During part of the latter song, she walked down stairs to leave the stage and stand amongst the crowd on the field. After returning to the stage, Twain got on a lift that then elevated her as fireworks were launched.

No Doubt then sang their hit "Just a Girl" with lead singer Gwen Stefani ad-libbing lines like "I'm just a girl at the Super Bowl!"

The show concluded with Sting performing "Message in a Bottle", with Stefani joining in midway through.

== Setlist ==
- "Man! I Feel like a Woman!" (Shania Twain)
- "Up!" (Shania Twain)
- "Just a Girl" (No Doubt)
- "Message in a Bottle" (Sting with No Doubt)

== Reception ==
=== Critical ===
Critics praised No Doubt and Sting's portion of the show, but gave a negative reception to Twain's portion of the show. Rolling Stone magazine called Twain's performance, a “career-freezing” bomb. Some argued that Twain, who was supposed to be the main attraction of the show, instead was overshadowed by No Doubt and Sting. The rendition of "Message in a Bottle" was regarded as the highlight of the show by some critics.

The show has, retrospectively, been ranked low among Super Bowl halftime performances by a number of outlets. Other outlets have ranked it in the middle tier of halftime shows. In 2020, E! ranked it among the best. Retrospectively, Jennifer Earl and Andy Sahadeo of Fox News wrote that the show, with Twain and Stefani front and center, presented a "girl power" moment.

=== Commercial ===
All the performers saw their latest releases receive a boost in sales in the week following the performance. Twain's Up! saw a 41% increase, No Doubt's Rock Steady saw a 23% increase, and Sting's The Very Best of Sting & The Police saw a 39% increase in sales.
