= Super Bowl XXXVIII halftime show =

- Part of: Super Bowl XXXVIII
- Date: February 1, 2004
- Location: Houston, Texas
- Venue: Reliant Stadium
- Headliner: Janet Jackson, Justin Timberlake, P. Diddy, Nelly, Kid Rock, Jessica Simpson
- Special guests: Spirit of Houston marching band, Ocean of Soul marching band
- Sponsor: AOL TopSpeed
- Producer: MTV

Super Bowl halftime show chronology
XXXVII (2003)	XXXVIII (2004)	XXXIX (2005)

The Super Bowl XXXVIII halftime show, known through corporate sponsorship as the Super Bowl XXXVIII AOL TopSpeed Halftime Show took place on February 1, 2004, at the Reliant Stadium in Houston, Texas, as part of Super Bowl XXXVIII. It featured Janet Jackson, Justin Timberlake, P. Diddy, Nelly, Kid Rock, and Jessica Simpson.

The halftime show was produced by MTV, and the show was centered on the network's Choose or Lose campaign (the year 2004 was a presidential election year in the United States).

Immense controversy arose from an incident during the show in which one of Jackson's breasts—adorned with a nipple shield—was exposed by Timberlake.

== Background and development ==
In 2002, Entertainment Weekly reported that Jackson was the original choice to perform at the halftime show for Super Bowl XXXVI; however, the NFL ultimately decided to select U2 to headline it after a group of NFL owners and officials attended the band's concert in New York City shortly after the September 11 attacks. In September 2003, the NFL announced that Jackson would be the headline performer of the Super Bowl XXXVIII halftime show. Because the event was occurring during an election year, MTV, who was tasked with producing the show, decided that the theme would heavily focus on the network's "Choose or Lose" campaign, which encouraged younger viewers to be politically active and register to vote. AOL Topspeed spent $10 million to sponsor the show.

Prior to the halftime show, Jackson and Timberlake had a friendship and working relationship. Timberlake had attended Jackson's Rhythm Nation Tour as an adolescent, and Jackson's energetic dance routines and daring performing style made a deep impression on him. While Timberlake was a member of pop group 'N Sync, Jackson selected the boy band as the opening act for many dates of her blockbuster Velvet Rope World Tour, which helped promote and introduce the then-relatively unknown group and Timberlake to the public worldwide. While on the tour, Jackson further promoted the group by performing with 'N Sync on several dates, including joining the group for a live a cappella duet of Stevie Wonder's "Overjoyed". Following the tour, Timberlake and Jackson became "good friends", with Jackson also praising Timberlake. When asked who he thought was "the sexiest woman on the planet", Timberlake said "I've thought Janet Jackson has nothing but sex appeal, so I'd probably say her." Timberlake later asked Jackson to sing backing vocals on "(And She Said) Take Me Now", a song from his debut solo album Justified.

The performance's sound engineer Patrick Baltzell complained of the acoustics in the stadium during the performance, recounting: “It was a disaster. You couldn’t understand a single lyric.” He stated that the shape of Reliant Stadium and its P.A. system produced a muffled sound, and stadium ownership as well as the NFL refused to allow Baltzell to place temporary speakers in locations that might block any fan's view of the stadium's video screens.

== Synopsis ==
The performance was preceded by Sway Calloway introducing the show and its lineup in a voiceover, followed by a video montage encouraging people to vote. The montage featuring celebrities such as John Elway, Beyoncé, Tony Hawk, Jennifer Lopez, Elijah Wood, Chris Rock, Julia Roberts, Muhammad Ali, Jay-Z, Tom Cruise and others declaring things people can "choose", concluding with an urging that viewers choose to vote. The performance then began with a brief introduction by Jessica Simpson who shouted, "Houston, choose to party!". This was followed by a joint performance of "The Way You Move" by the University of Houston "Spirit of Houston" marching band and the Texas Southern University "Ocean of Soul" marching band.

Jackson then took stage to perform "All for You". At the start of the song, she descended in a stage elevator.

Following this, lights dimmed and P. Diddy took stage on a secondary stage, located elsewhere on the field, emerging from a cloud of stage fog. He proceeded to perform "Bad Boy for Life". He was then joined by cheerleaders who performed a version of the song "Mickey", which substituted "Diddy", and later "Nelly", for "Mickey". Nelly then entered in a car, joining Diddy on stage to perform "Hot in Herre", during which the cheerleaders proceeded to remove articles of their clothing. Diddy then performed "Mo Money Mo Problems".

Following this, Kid Rock took stage on yet another secondary stage, located elsewhere on the field, and performed "Bawitdaba" followed by "Cowboy". He did so wearing an American Flag that had been fashioned into a poncho.

Jackson then took stage on the main stage again performing "Rhythm Nation" with the song's music video choreography. She donned mostly the same outfit she had during "All for You", with some differences, such as different skirt than before. Timberlake joined her, and performed "Rock Your Body" with her, at the end of which song he tore off a part of her top, revealing her breast (baring a nipple shield).

The show ended with voiceovers, again, declaring things to "choose", including getting involved.

== Setlist ==
- "The Way You Move" (Spirit of Houston and Ocean of Soul marching bands)
- "All for You" (Janet Jackson)
- "Bad Boy for Life" (P. Diddy)
- "Diddy" to the tune of "Mickey"
- "Hot in Herre" (Nelly)
- "Mo Money Mo Problems" (P. Diddy)
- "Bawitdaba" (Kid Rock)
- "Cowboy" (Kid Rock)
- "Rhythm Nation" (Janet Jackson)
- "Rock Your Body" (Justin Timberlake with Janet Jackson)

== Controversies ==
Major controversy arose from the exposure of Jackson's right breast, which was adorned with a nipple shield. Jackson and Timberlake both denied the incident was intentional, with Timberlake characterizing it as a "wardrobe malfunction". The controversy had a long-lasting impact on media and popular culture.

=== Other controversy ===
Kid Rock received criticism from Veterans of Foreign Wars and Senator Zell Miller for, during his performance, wearing an American flag which had been fashioned into a poncho by the cutting of a slit into its middle. Kid Rock was accused by these critics of having committed flag desecration.
