= Tuck rule (American football) =

Former NFL rule

The tuck rule was a controversial rule in American football used by the National Football League from 1999 until 2013. It stated:

NFL Rule 3, Section 22, Article 2, Note 2. When [an offensive] player is holding the ball to pass it forward, any intentional forward movement of his arm starts a forward pass, even if the player loses possession of the ball as he is attempting to tuck it back toward his body. Also, if the player has tucked the ball into his body and then loses possession, it is a fumble.

This is referred to as the tuck rule because the ball leaving the quarterback's hands is considered a forward pass even if the quarterback intends not to pass the ball, but instead continues the forward motion to tuck the ball back into his body. Only once the forward motion of the arm is completed, and the ball tucked into the quarterback's body, would a subsequent loss of possession be considered a fumble.

Mike Pereira, the former director of officiating of the NFL, noted that the design of the rule avoids the question of the quarterback's intention, except that the referee still must judge whether the initial forward movement of the arm was "intentional".

== History ==
=== Jets vs. Patriots (2001) ===
The tuck rule was called in Week 2 of an NFL regular season matchup on September 23, 2001, between the New England Patriots and the New York Jets. With 1:01 left in the second quarter, Patriots defensive end Anthony Pleasant apparently forced Jets quarterback Vinny Testaverde to fumble the ball, with Patriots defensive end Richard Seymour making a recovery. The call was overturned upon review and ruled an incomplete pass, with the tuck rule cited. The Jets tied the game with a field goal on that drive before going on to win 10–3. Patriots head coach Bill Belichick referred to this game after the subsequent Tuck Rule Game, telling ESPN, "I knew what the ruling should have been because we had dealt with that play a little bit earlier in the year on the other side of it."

=== Raiders vs. Patriots ("Tuck Rule Game") (2001) ===
The tuck rule resulted in a controversial finish to an AFC divisional playoff game on January 19, 2002, between the New England Patriots and the Oakland Raiders.

In the closing moments of the fourth quarter of the game in a snowy Foxboro Stadium, with New England trailing by three points, New England quarterback Tom Brady dropped back to pass. After he had begun a passing motion, Brady clearly ceased his throwing motion, pulled his right hand down below his shoulder and had touched the ball to his left hand when, coming off the strong side corner blitz, Charles Woodson knocked the ball out of Brady's hands. Raiders middle linebacker Greg Biekert then fell on the loose football. The officials initially called the play a recovered fumble, which would have sealed the victory for the Raiders. After instant replay, referee Walt Coleman reversed this call, declared the play an incomplete forward pass, and gave possession back to New England. In explaining the reversal to the crowd, Coleman stated that the ball was moving forward at the time it was dropped. In later interviews, Coleman stated that it was his explanation, not the reversal, that was in error; the ball was moving backwards when it was lost, but the tuck rule applied. Patriots kicker Adam Vinatieri later tied the game with a 45-yard field goal; in overtime, the Patriots defeated the Raiders on another field goal. Two games later, the Patriots won Super Bowl XXXVI.

The NFL defended the call, but Bruce Allen, who ran the front office for the Raiders at the time of the game, said, "The rule itself doesn't bother me, but the way the rule is written, it was a fumble." The NFL's Competition Committee re-examined the rule after the season but did not change the rule.

=== Redskins vs. Broncos (2005) ===
The tuck rule was enforced in a regular season game on October 9, 2005, between the Washington Redskins and the Denver Broncos. Broncos quarterback Jake Plummer lost the football while in the Broncos' own end zone. Referees initially called the play a fumble and awarded the Redskins a safety, but after instant-replay review cited the tuck rule in reversing the decision and calling it an incomplete pass. The Broncos eventually went on to win the game. Afterwards, Redskins head coach Joe Gibbs said, "It makes no sense to me. It's the way it's worded. I think everybody probably sees that and says it's a bad rule." Pereira said the rule came up in games about 12 to 15 times per season and explained that despite its unpopularity, the competition committee had been unable to come up with a better rule.

=== Chiefs vs. Ravens (2010 season) ===
The tuck rule was also enforced in an NFL playoff game on January 9, 2011, between the Kansas City Chiefs and the Baltimore Ravens. After this game, Mike Pereira, the former NFL vice-president for officiating, stated that he was no longer in support of the tuck rule.

=== Repeal ===
In March 2013, the NFL competition committee proposed that league owners eliminate the tuck rule. The owners abolished the rule with a 29–1 vote at the 2013 annual meeting in Phoenix on March 20, 2013. The only team to vote against the elimination of the tuck rule was the Pittsburgh Steelers, while the New England Patriots and Washington Redskins abstained from the vote. Afterwards, referring obliquely to the 2002 Tuck Rule Game, Patriots owner Robert Kraft said, "I love the tuck rule, and forever will, and I know [longtime Raiders owner] Al Davis, may he rest in peace, is probably smiling." The current rule reads:

Passer Tucks Ball. If the player loses possession of the ball during an attempt to bring it back toward his body, or if the player loses possession after he has tucked the ball into his body, it is a fumble.
