= Super Bowl XXXVI halftime show =

Halftime show of the 2002 Super Bowl

- Part of: Super Bowl XXXVI
- Date: February 3, 2002
- Location: New Orleans, Louisiana
- Venue: Louisiana Superdome
- Headliner: U2
- Sponsor: E-Trade
- Producer: Clear Channel Entertainment

Super Bowl halftime show chronology
XXXV (2001)	XXXVI (2002)	XXXVII (2003)

The Super Bowl XXXVI halftime show, known through corporate sponsorship as the E-Trade Super Bowl XXXVI Halftime Show, was the halftime entertainment of Super Bowl XXXVI, which took place on February 3, 2002, at the Louisiana Superdome in New Orleans, Louisiana. It featured Irish rock band U2 as the performer. Using a heart-shaped stage replicated from their 2001 Elevation Tour, the group played three songs and paid tribute to the victims of the September 11 attacks, which had occurred in the United States five months earlier. The show was produced by Clear Channel Entertainment, which also produced the band's Elevation Tour. The Super Bowl and its halftime show were televised nationally in the U.S. by Fox.

Singer Janet Jackson was originally booked as the halftime performer, but after the September 11 attacks, it was decided that a different artist would be needed to set the appropriate tone. U2 were selected as the replacement after several executives from the National Football League (NFL) attended one of their October 2001 concerts in New York City and were emotionally impacted by the band's tribute to the attack victims, whose names were projected across the ceiling of Madison Square Garden. During their halftime performance, the band played their 2000 hit single "Beautiful Day", the 1984 song "MLK", and their 1987 hit single "Where the Streets Have No Name". During the latter two songs, U2's tribute to the September 11 victims was reprised, as their names were projected onto a vertical scrim behind the stage and across the interior of the Superdome. At the end of the performance, lead singer Bono opened his jacket to reveal an American flag in the lining.

The halftime show drew a 38.3 Nielsen rating and was watched by 82.9 million viewers in 40.2 million households in the US. It received generally positive reviews from critics, who praised the band's performance and the poignancy of the 9/11 tribute. In the week following U2's performance, sales of their 2000 album All That You Can't Leave Behind increased in the US by 142 percent. In 2006, U2 returned to the Superdome as the entertainment for another NFL game, performing with Green Day for the New Orleans Saints' first home game since Hurricane Katrina. Many critics have ranked U2's performance at Super Bowl XXXVI among the top Super Bowl halftime shows.

== Background ==
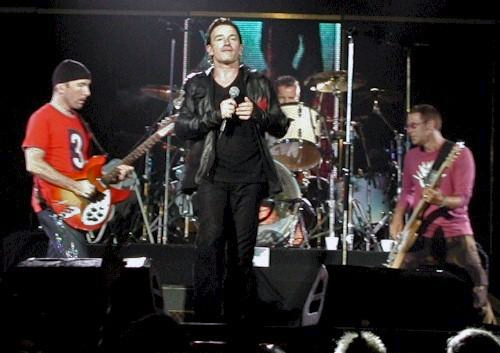
U2 performing in Berlin in July 2001 during their Elevation Tour

U2's 2000 studio album All That You Can't Leave Behind was commercially and critically successful. It debuted at number one in 32 countries and sold 10 million copies by December 2001. The record's lead single, "Beautiful Day", was a worldwide hit, and in February 2001 it won Grammy Awards for Best Rock Performance by a Duo or Group with Vocal, Song of the Year, and Record of the Year. The band embarked on a concert tour, the Elevation Tour, in March 2001. The first two legs sold out all 83 concerts across North America and Europe, grossing US$105 million.

On September 10, 2001, Clear Channel Entertainment (CCE) and SFX Entertainment announced a third leg of the Elevation Tour, consisting of a return trip to North America. Tickets for the shows were scheduled to go on sale on September 15, but the day after the announcement, the September 11 attacks occurred in the United States; four passenger airliners were hijacked by al-Qaeda terrorists and crashed in New York City and near Washington, D.C., killing nearly 3,000 people. CCE and SFX postponed ticket sales out of respect for the tragedy. Many artists cancelled tours of North America altogether in the wake of the attacks, but CCE and SFX announced on September 17 that the Elevation Tour would continue as planned and that tickets would go on sale for various shows starting September 21.

Following the attacks, All That You Can't Leave Behind found added resonance with American audiences, as the album climbed on the Billboard 200 chart and songs such as "Walk On" and "Peace on Earth" garnered radio airplay. Both tracks were performed during U2's appearance on the America: A Tribute to Heroes telethon to benefit the attack victims. The Elevation Tour was the top-earning North American tour of 2001 with a gross of $109.7 million, the second-highest ever at the time for a North American tour. Globally, it grossed $143.5 million from 2.18 million tickets sold, making it the year's highest-grossing tour overall. U2 was named "Band of the Year" by the magazines Rolling Stone and Spin.

As a result of the September 11 attacks, the National Football League (NFL) postponed its games scheduled for that week until the end of the 2001 regular season. To allow the playoffs to be held in their entirety, in October the NFL rescheduled Super Bowl XXXVI at the Louisiana Superdome from January 27 to February 3, 2002.

== Booking ==
Jim Steeg, the executive of special events for the NFL, booked the original entertainment lineup for Super Bowl XXXVI by August 2001. The billing would have featured performers from a diverse range of musical genres: Lionel Richie for "America the Beautiful", the Bee Gees and Creedence Clearwater Revival for a pregame performance, and Janet Jackson for the halftime show. However, after the September 11 attacks, Jackson cancelled the European leg of her All for You Tour and was not travelling, and she decided to pull out of the Super Bowl after realising her show would not fit the mood that was required.

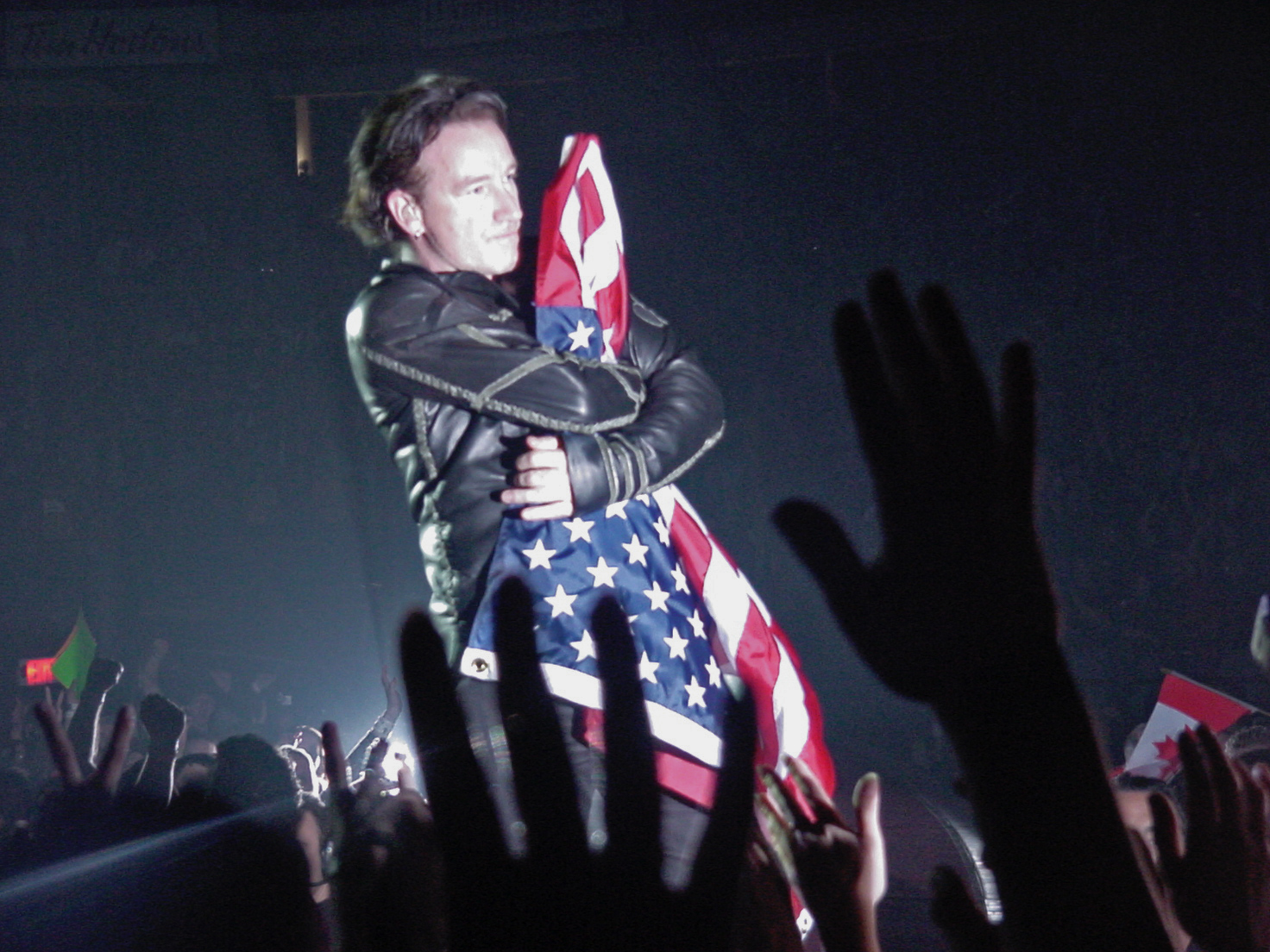
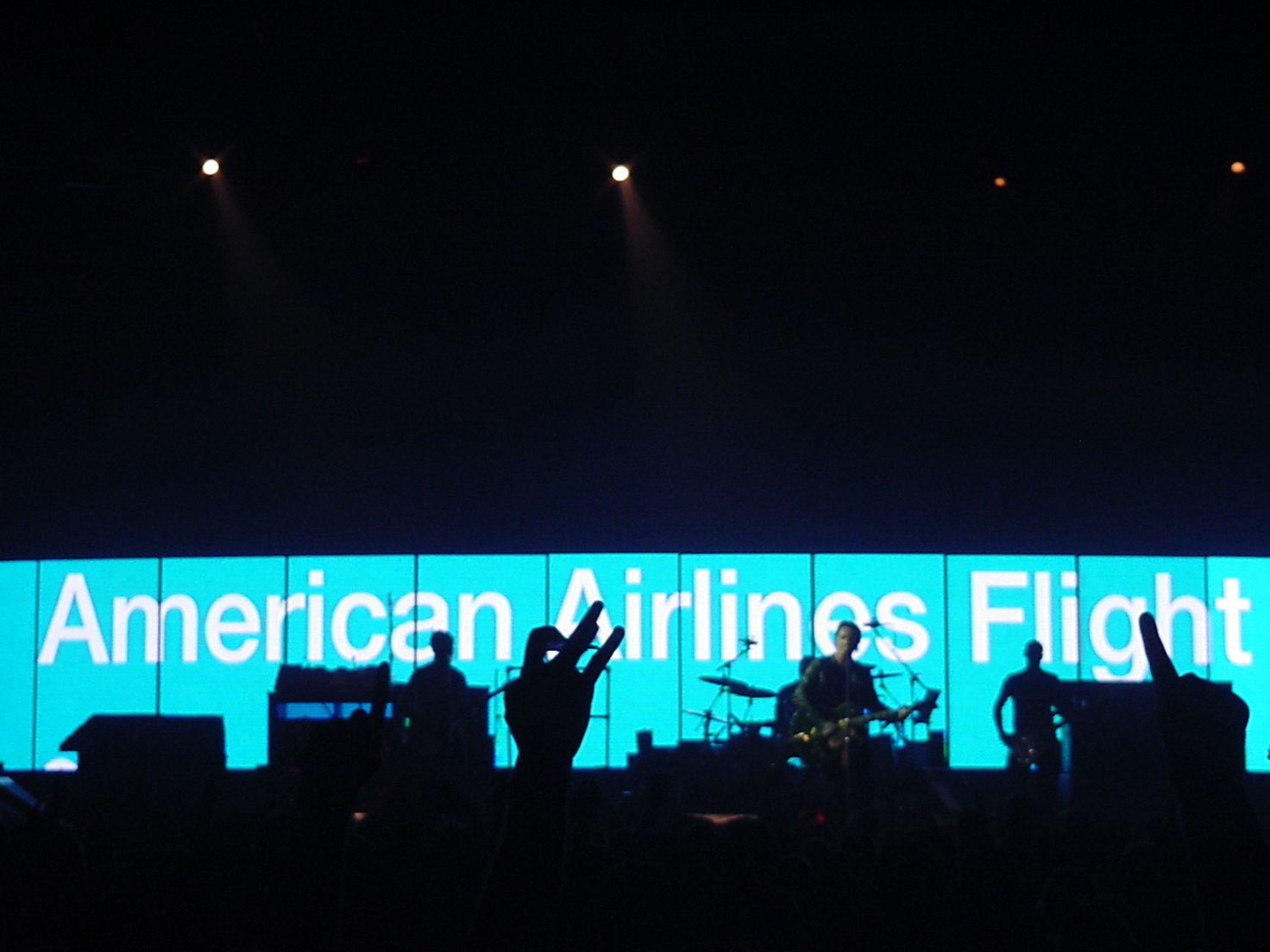
U2 during a post-9/11 concert in October 2001: Bono hugs an American flag, and the video screens begin to list the victims' names

NFL marketing executive John Collins was tasked with finding a replacement for the halftime show. On October 25, 2001, he attended a U2 concert at Madison Square Garden in New York City. During the band's performance of "One", a scrolling list of the names of the 9/11 victims appeared on screen. Collins witnessed fans becoming emotional at that moment, and realised U2 would make an ideal replacement for the halftime show. In a meeting the following day, Collins and two other league officials who had attended the concert discussed its poignancy and unanimously agreed with the idea of booking the group. NFL spokesperson Brian McCarthy said, "we certainly like the music, but we like the message that U2 carries, which is responsibility to others and a sense of freedom". Collins called Jimmy Iovine, chairman of Interscope Records and producer of U2's 1988 album Rattle and Hum, and pitched him on U2 recreating the same tribute at the Super Bowl. Iovine contacted the band's lead vocalist Bono and conveyed the NFL's proposal to him.

The following day, Bono met with several executives of the NFL, including Collins, Steeg, commissioner Paul Tagliabue, COO Roger Goodell, and New England Patriots owner Robert Kraft. Bono was enthusiastic about the prospect of being involved in a Super Bowl halftime show and proposed an extravagant show that would incorporate elements of world music. Many were skeptical of the idea, and the NFL debated for several days whether to book U2. Some argued against an Irish act paying tribute to the victims of an American tragedy, while a television executive mentioned that a past U2 television special had drawn low ratings. Goodell was immediately on board with the idea of booking the band, and while Tagliabue was initially uncertain, he ultimately came around and decided to book them. Greg Hagglund, vice president and executive producer of CCE, met with U2 in Las Vegas during a stop on their Elevation Tour to have a brainstorming session about the show. He said that Bono "had such a grasp of what he wanted and what we and the NFL felt was appropriate".

On November 27, 2001, it was reported that E-Trade had reached an agreement with the NFL to sponsor the halftime show for the third consecutive year. The deal was reportedly worth more than US$3 million. On November 30, the NFL announced that CCE had been selected to produce the halftime show, and on December 2, the league announced that U2 would perform. Super Bowl XXXVI marked the first time that CCE was involved in a Super Bowl halftime show; most of the previous halftime shows had been produced by the television networks, with the exception of Super Bowl XXXV's show in 2001 that was produced by MTV. U2 were the first international act to be the sole performer for a Super Bowl halftime show. McCarthy said: "we were looking for a band that would help capture and lift the spirit of America and the world. With U2 we found what we were looking for." Regarding the show's content, he added: "This year, we're looking to make it more relevant and meaningful, rather than dropping a rock concert in the middle of a football game. We're looking to provide entertainment that's memorable and inspiring." U2's booking was in line with the NFL recasting the Super Bowl entertainment under the theme "Heroes, Hope, and Homeland". McCarthy said, "With the events of September 11th, we've redefined and refocused the game presentation, and the theme is celebration and the human spirit and the values of freedom, and also to everyday heroes".

U2 and other musical acts at the Super Bowl were unpaid for their performances, as the NFL covered only travel expenses and accommodations in New Orleans. An NFL insider said, "We would have paid U2, but they didn't want any money."

== Promotion ==
An NFL representative said one factor in the league's decision to select CCE to produce the halftime show was its ability to use its vast media holdings, which included 1,200 radio stations, to promote the event. To increase interest in the Super Bowl in the weeks preceding it, NFL Films re-shot the music videos for U2's songs "Stuck in a Moment You Can't Get Out Of" and "Beautiful Day" to include football footage. The NFL and Fox both used the band's songs in television commercials advertising the 2001–02 NFL playoffs. Collins said that the league's and Interscope Records' objective was "to help make U2 synonymous with the NFL".

America Online held a sweepstake contest to award a Super Bowl XXXVI trip package to one of its members and a guest. The package included access to the inside of U2's heart-shaped stage during their halftime performance.

In a counterprogramming move against the halftime show, on December 17, 2001, NBC announced it would air an episode of Fear Factor featuring Playboy Playmates at the same time that Fox would broadcast the halftime show.

== Preparations and rehearsals ==
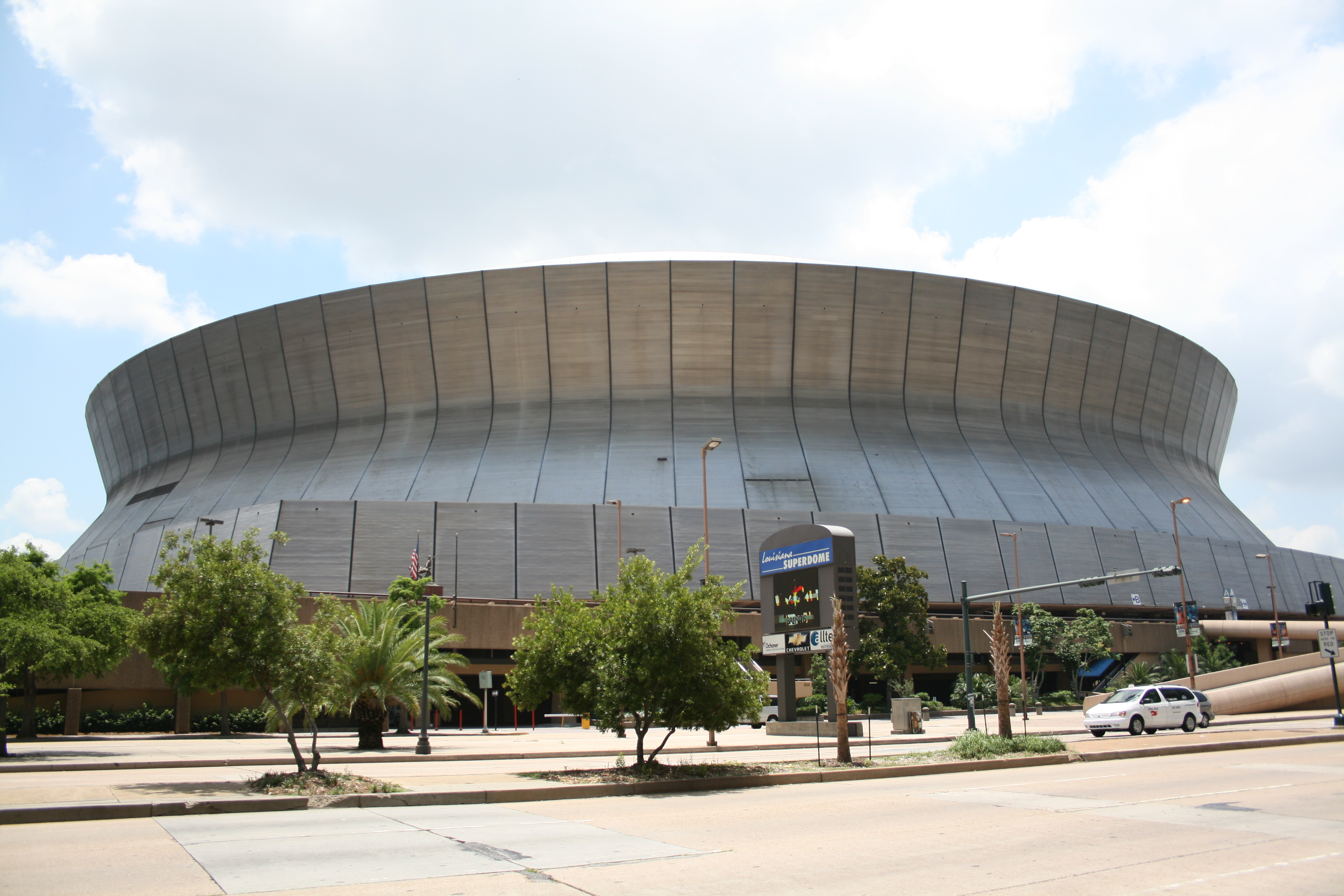
The Louisiana Superdome, site of Super Bowl XXXVI

A few weeks before the game, a major production issue arose when organizers discovered they were unable to power the projectors that would scroll the victims' names across the domed ceiling of the Superdome. Collins was irate and demanded organizers resolve the problem, stating, "The only reason Paul Tagliabue approved this was because of the names going across the roof." A generator was ultimately located, allowing the projection to proceed. Around January 21, 2002, production crews arrived at Tad Gormley Stadium at the University of New Orleans to work on the logistical aspects of the halftime show, particularly the process of building and disassembling the stage on the field in the mandated amount of time. After arriving in New Orleans on January 30, the band rehearsed in the Superdome and participated in a 20-minute press conference that day. During rehearsals, it was debated whether to project the victims' names onto a scrim behind the stage or not; the projection was not powerful enough to be seen across the ceiling. Ultimately, the scrim was adopted, but to some, the effect did not look good. After the Friday rehearsal just two days before the Super Bowl, one NFL executive remained cynical about the show's prospects, saying, "This is going to be the worst halftime show ever."

== Show production ==
CCE's Special Events Group in St. Louis was responsible for managing the timing and technical aspects of the show, as well as managing talent. Hagglund produced the performance and coordinated with the special events department. The NFL set financial and creative terms for the halftime show. Hagglund called it "the biggest special event we've ever done". CCE employed 45 full-time staff members to work on the halftime show, in addition to contractors, stagehands, and volunteers. The halftime show ran for 23 minutes; setup and disassembly of the stage on the field required five-to-six minutes each, leaving the band between 11–12 minutes to perform. Hagglund called it an "unbelievable challenge". Producer Dennis M. Despie oversaw the show from a location 200 feet above the stage. Sergeant Sam Dotson of the Metropolitan Police Department, City of St. Louis coordinated security for the halftime show. Jim McClellan served as a co-executive producer.

== Stage design and equipment ==
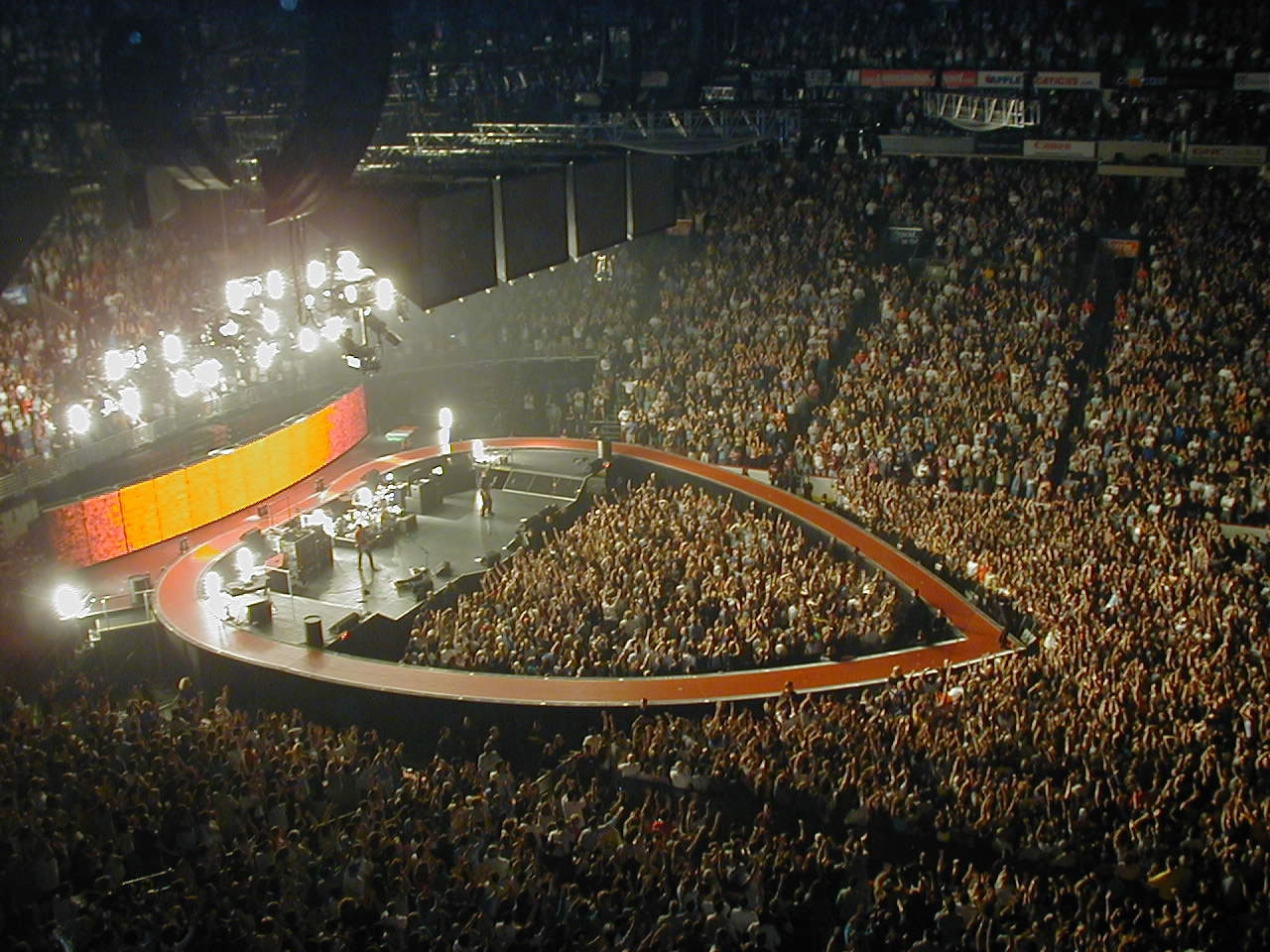
The heart-shaped stage from U2's Elevation Tour (pictured) was replicated for their halftime performance.

The stage, which featured a heart shape with an open center, was replicated from the one designed by Mark Fisher for the band's 2001 Elevation Tour. Between 2,000 and 3,000 winners of a Clear Channel radio promotion were selected to be on field for the performance, 400 of whom occupied the inside of the heart. The stage comprised 22 interlocking pieces varying in weight from 700 to 3,500 pounds (320 to 1,590 kg); in total, the stage weighed 50,000 pounds (23,000 kg). The sections of the stage were wheeled onto the field by a team of 250 volunteers, who were split into groups of ten and blended in with the rest of the on-field audience after completing the stage assembly. The wheels of each stage segment had soft tires to avoid damaging the playing surface.

The names of the 9/11 victims were projected by twelve 7-kilowatt xenon PIGI film projectors manufactured by E/T/C Audiovisuel and supplied by Fourth Phase Image Systems Group; they were the same type of projectors used during the band's Elevation Tour. The victims' names were projected across the interior of the Superdome, as well as onto a Kabuki scrim measuring 120 feet (37 m) high by 60 feet (18 m) wide. Willie Williams and Catherine Owens created the projections, while Brian Beasley operated the projectors.

Much of the same lighting equipment from the Elevation Tour was used for the halftime show. In partnership with Williams, lighting directors Bob Dicksinon and Ted Wells used two lighting systems with luminaires by Vari-Lite. The one suspended above the stage featured 38 VL2416 fixtures, 24 VL5 fixtures, 210 VL5Arc fixtures, and 18 VL7 fixtures, and it was controlled by Victor Fable with a Virtuoso console. The lighting system at ground level comprised 30 VL2416 fixtures, 12 VL5 fixtures, and 30 VL5Arc fixtures, and was controlled by Willy McLachlan with a Virtuoso console. Bruce Ramus operated the lighting. U2's halftime set required three times more cabling and lighting than the previous three Super Bowls in New Orleans combined.

ATK AudioTek Corp. coordinated the audio aspects of the show. Their JBL VerTec speaker system was suspended above the stage, while their portable V-DOSC cart speaker system was wheeled onto the field at ground level. All-digital mixing consoles were used, including a 48-channel InnovaSon Grand Live console that served as the front-of-house mixing station for all entertainment for the fans in attendance. James Stoffo of Orlando's Professional Wireless supplied the wireless microphone equipment, which consisted of ten Sennheiser SKM 5000 microphone/transmitter sets and two Sennheiser EM 1046 receiver units (each capable of eight channels). Stoffo, who had worked on seven prior Super Bowls, was responsible for managing issues related to RF interference; over 1,500 other frequencies were occupied on gameday, 300 of which were in the same frequency band as the SKM 5000 microphones.

== Performance synopsis ==
Organisers said that most of the musical performers at Super Bowl XXXVI would pre-record their performances to reduce the possibility of technical problems. U2, however, said they intended to play live for the halftime show. When asked if he would lip sync, Bono said: "I'll be singing live. Call us old-fashioned, but I thought it might be novel. It might catch on with the kids." A backing rhythm track accompanied the band's live performance as a precaution. Despie said it was required as a "technical protection" against "the risk of a show going down". An Associated Press report published days before the Super Bowl claimed that the band would perform "Walk On". It was confirmed that the band would perform three songs, but they did not announce in advance which ones. The websites for U2 and the Super Bowl stated that they would play at least one track from a list consisting of "I Still Haven't Found What I'm Looking For", "Desire", "Pride (In the Name of Love)", and "Beautiful Day".

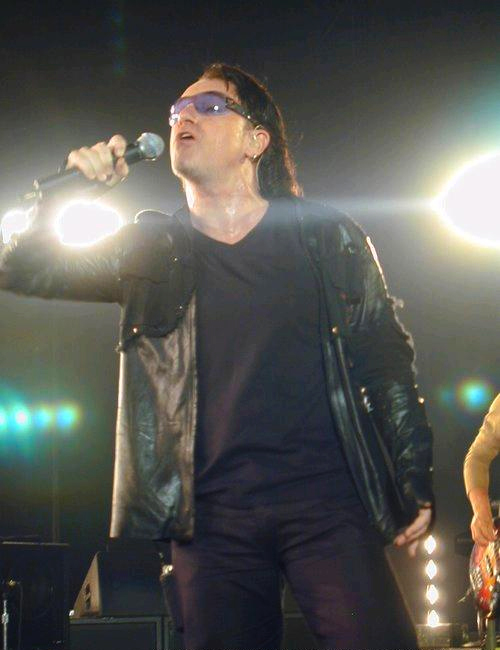
U2 lead singer Bono in July 2001

The on-field audience held light sticks. The show began with U2 performing their 2000 hit single "Beautiful Day". For the first verse, Bono walked with a cameraman through the on-field crowd to reach the stage. While doing so, fans started slapping Bono on the back. Realising the wires for his in-ear monitors were exposed, he began to panic. He said: "All one person has to do is pull the wire, and I'm off air. I would hear nothing. Off the air in front of a billion people!" Bono said that his smirking facial reaction was a reflection of his fear at that moment; he admitted that he was "swaggering with the most annoying smirk ever seen. You just think: That guy is such a prat!"

The band's second song was the elegiac "MLK", during which the scrim was raised behind the stage, onto which a scrolling list of names of the 9/11 victims were projected. This segment segued into the third and final song, the band's 1987 hit single "Where the Streets Have No Name". Towards the end of the song, the scrim was released to the ground, and the names continued to scroll across the interior of the Superdome. Terry Price of the Hartford Courant said it was "eerily reminiscent of the World Trade Center collapses". At the conclusion of the song, Bono opened his leather jacket to reveal an American flag in the lining.

== Reception ==
U2's halftime show performance received generally positive reviews. Dan Shaughnessy of The Boston Globe called it: "the greatest halftime show in the history of sporting events. Hands down." John Smyntek of the Detroit Free Press rated U2's performance "Four stars all the way", saying that it "sure beat other recent Super Bowl halves that tried to telescope the wide world of pop". Phillip B. Wilson of The Indianapolis Star gave the halftime show a "B" rating and called it a "touching tribute" to the victims of September 11. Roger Catlin of the Hartford Courant said that U2 was a "perfect fit" for the occasion, calling them "a group clearly used to big events, big crowds and big statements". He praised the decision to perform the uplifting "Where the Streets Have No Name" and Bono's revelation of the American flag in his jacket lining, saying it was "as if to demonstrate beneath his rock star exterior, he's with his U.S. fans on this most American of days". Tom Shales of The Washington Post said of the band's tribute to the 9/11 victims, "To some, it may have seemed rather a garish memorial, but in a strangely affecting way, it worked, and respectfully." Tim Goodman of the San Francisco Chronicle said: "The real deal was an inspired bit of rock from U2 as the halftime entertainment. Here's a quick pop quiz: Has the halftime show ever been good? Ever? Pencils down. Correct answer: Not in our lifetime. And yet, U2's live breath of fresh air and dramatic, emotional spectacle that paid homage to the victims of Sept. 11 was both daringly bombastic and also pretty damn cool." David Bianculli of the New York Daily News said that the halftime show "managed to strike the right mood of patriotism, pride and solemnity." He added: "It was theater, yes – but on a grand scale. Given the occasion, it was grand indeed." Peter King of CNN/SI called the band's performance "perfect for the occasion" and said, "I praise you, NFL, selfishly, for giving me 11 terrific minutes at halftime of a great event".

Tim Kawakami of the San Jose Mercury News said: "Many Roman numerals down the road, I'll still remember those shimmering moments when the banner dropped, U2 played loud, live and intimate, and the names of those lost in the Sept. 11 attacks glowed in the dark, lit by spotlights and projected onto the crowd." Ed Bark of The Dallas Morning News called the performance "electrifying" and said about the tribute, "The roaring crowd reaction dwarfed anything produced by the game itself until the Patriots' thrilling victory on a last-second field goal." Hal Boedeker of The Orlando Sentinel praised the performance for being "thrilling" with "urgent, powerful renditions" of the songs and for its tribute to the 9/11 victims. Boedeker said the halftime show "elevated the patriotic Fox broadcast" and was "mercifully simpler than the usually overproduced halftimes". Kevin C. Johnson of the St. Louis Post-Dispatch called the show an "unqualified success" and U2's performance "crowd-rousing". He said, "when you have U2 as your headliner and only act, you've got a guaranteed winner on your hands". Despite scepticism about U2's decision to play the Super Bowl halftime show, Chris Willman of Entertainment Weekly said: "Once U2 took the makeshift stage, all my compunctions vanished. The three-song mini-set was nothing us fans hadn't seen before, but somehow, sharing it with the rest of America... made the moment more galvanizing, familiar or not." Eric Deggans of the St. Petersburg Times said that the Fear Factor counterprogramming "couldn't have been any more bloated or exploitative than U2's oddly out-of-place halftime performance". He said the fault did not lie with U2 themselves but that "it nevertheless seemed odd: An Irish band singing about transcending society's oppressive values before a list of people killed in America's most devastating attack". Ed Sherman of the Chicago Tribune criticised the halftime show for not paying enough reverence to the 9/11 victims when displaying their names, saying: "Instead U2 played to a screaming crowd that was bouncing up and down, completely oblivious to the banner memorializing the dead. That should have been a solemn moment, not the background for a rock show."

== Commercial impact ==
The Super Bowl was expected to draw 130 million viewers in the United States and 800 million worldwide. According to Nielsen ratings, U2's halftime show drew a 38.3 rating, equating to 40.2 million households and 82.9 million viewers in the United States. The performance lost only 4.4 percent of viewers from the previous half hour of the football game. NBC's counterprogramming, a Fear Factor episode featuring Playboy Playmates, drew only a 5.6 rating, equating to 5.9 million households.

In the week following U2's Super Bowl performance, All That You Can't Leave Behind sold 46,000 copies (a 142-percent increase) in the United States, causing it to jump on the Billboard 200 chart from number 66 to 25. Additionally, sales doubled for three of the group's older albums, resulting in jumps on the Top Pop Catalog Albums chart: The Best of 1980–1990 reached number 2 after selling 14,000 units (a 154-percent increase); The Joshua Tree reached number 14 after selling 7,000 units (a 144-percent increase); and The Best of 1990–2000/The B-Sides reached number 35.

USA Home Entertainment secured the rights to the video footage of U2's halftime performance, and included it as a bonus feature in DVD copies of the official Patriots Super Bowl championship video; it was the first Super Bowl championship video to feature a halftime show.

== Legacy ==
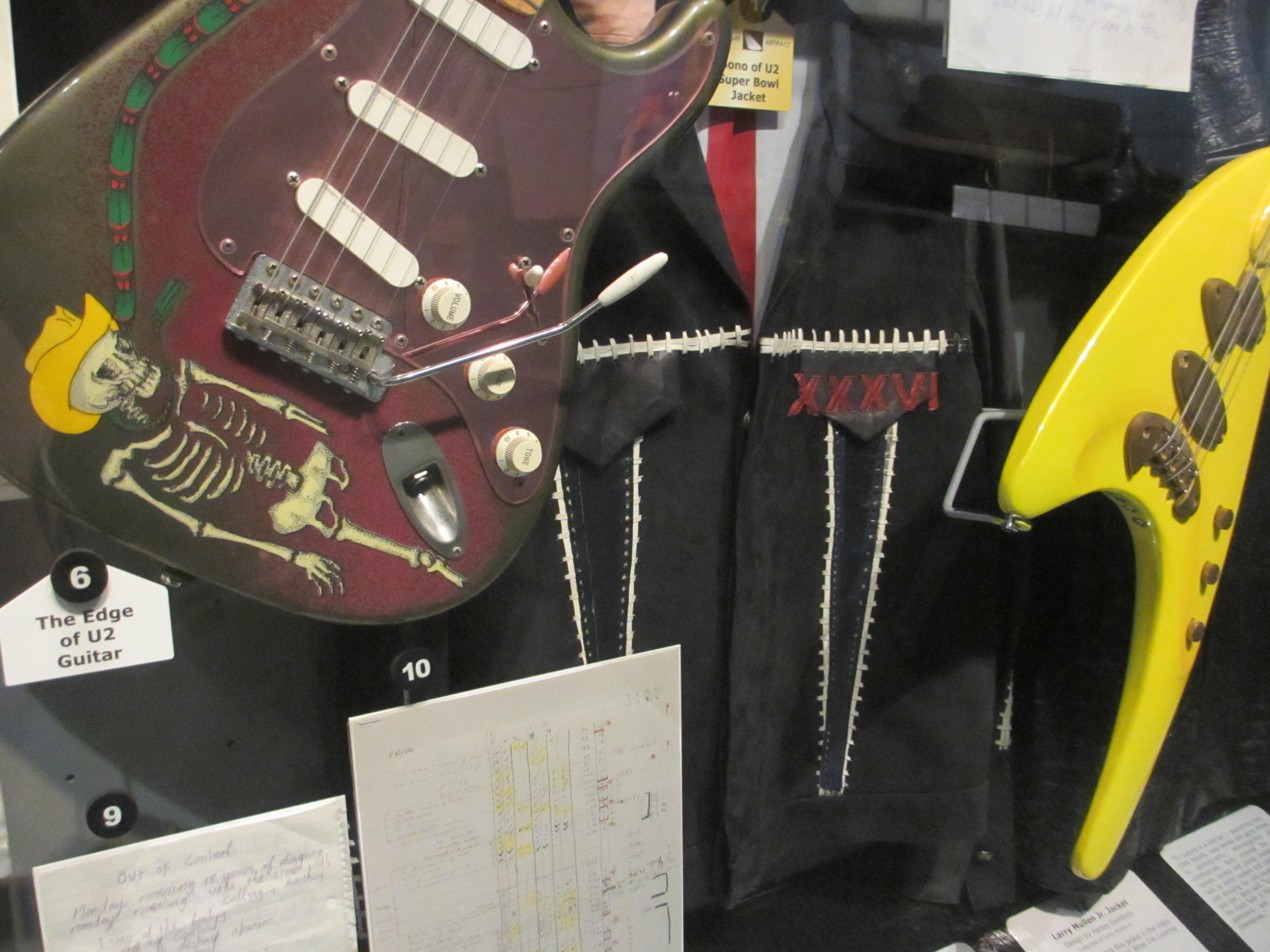
Bono's jacket from the halftime show, on display in the Rock and Roll Hall of Fame

U2's performance is considered by critics to be one of the best Super Bowl halftime shows. BBC Music and Variety ranked it seventh-best, while CBSSports.com ranked it sixth-best as of 2018. In 2019, Entertainment Weekly ranked it third-best, calling it "probably the most moving Super Bowl halftime performance to date". In 2024, Levi Weaver of The Athletic ranked U2's performance the third-best Super Bowl halftime show, saying that the group "managed to pull off the impossible — performing a touching tribute to a moment at the time still too big and too new to fully process, but doing so without sacrificing an ounce of showmanship or delving into jingoism". Jon Bream of The Minnesota Star Tribune ranked it third-best, calling it "far and away the most emotional halftime ever". Jim Harrington of The Mercury News ranked it the second-best of the 21st century, while Billboard and Roisin O'Connor of The Independent ranked it second-best overall. In 2021, Thrillist ranked it the second-best halftime show, saying, "U2 delivered the kind of bald sentimentality that both attracts and repels legions of fans and detractors, though it's tough not to appreciate the raw power of the performance" during the tribute to the September 11 victims.

In 2014, Rob Sheffield of Rolling Stone placed it first on his list of the best Super Bowl halftime shows, saying, "U2 created one of the truly great live-TV rock & roll moments of all time, up there with 'Bad' at Live Aid". He added: "Only U2 could have made this so grandiose, yet so emotionally direct. Grown men wept buckets. Every daft ambition U2 ever had, every lofty claim they ever made, they earned [that night]." Sheffield later re-ranked the performance to second-best in 2023. Tim Glanfield of The Times ranked it at the top of his list, calling it a "bittersweet mix of euphoric energy and moving reflection". Lisa Redmond of NBC Sports ranked it number one, saying, "While other halftime shows may have been more entertaining, none of them have had as much meaning as this one." Brian Mansfield of USA Today ranked it first, saying that U2 "gave a sentimental, cathartic performance that went from celebration to elegy and back... By embracing the nation's still-fresh pain, the band transcended the game, making the performance the only one that stands on its own as a cultural event." Sean Merriman of Bleacher Report ranked it first, calling it "one of the most moving musical tributes of all time". Other publications such as the Pittsburgh Post-Gazette, Sports Illustrated, and the NFL's own website also described or ranked it as the best Super Bowl halftime show. Writing for Uproxx, critic Steven Hyden ranked U2's Super Bowl concert 17th on a list of the best televised musical performances since 2000; he called it "one of the few times when the Super Bowl halftime show actually felt important as a virtual town square where people go to feel less alone".

On the fifth anniversary of the September 11 attacks, U2's halftime performance was re-aired on the NFL Total Access program on NFL Network.

On September 25, 2006, U2 once again performed at the Superdome in New Orleans as part of entertainment for an NFL football game. For the New Orleans Saints' first home game back at the Superdome since Hurricane Katrina in August 2005, U2 and Green Day performed four songs during a pre-game show: Green Day's song "Wake Me Up When September Ends", "The House of the Rising Sun", a cover of the Skids' track "The Saints Are Coming", and U2's "Beautiful Day".

== Setlist ==
1. "Beautiful Day"
2. "MLK"
3. "Where the Streets Have No Name"
