= Tuck rule (ice hockey) =

NHL uniform regulation

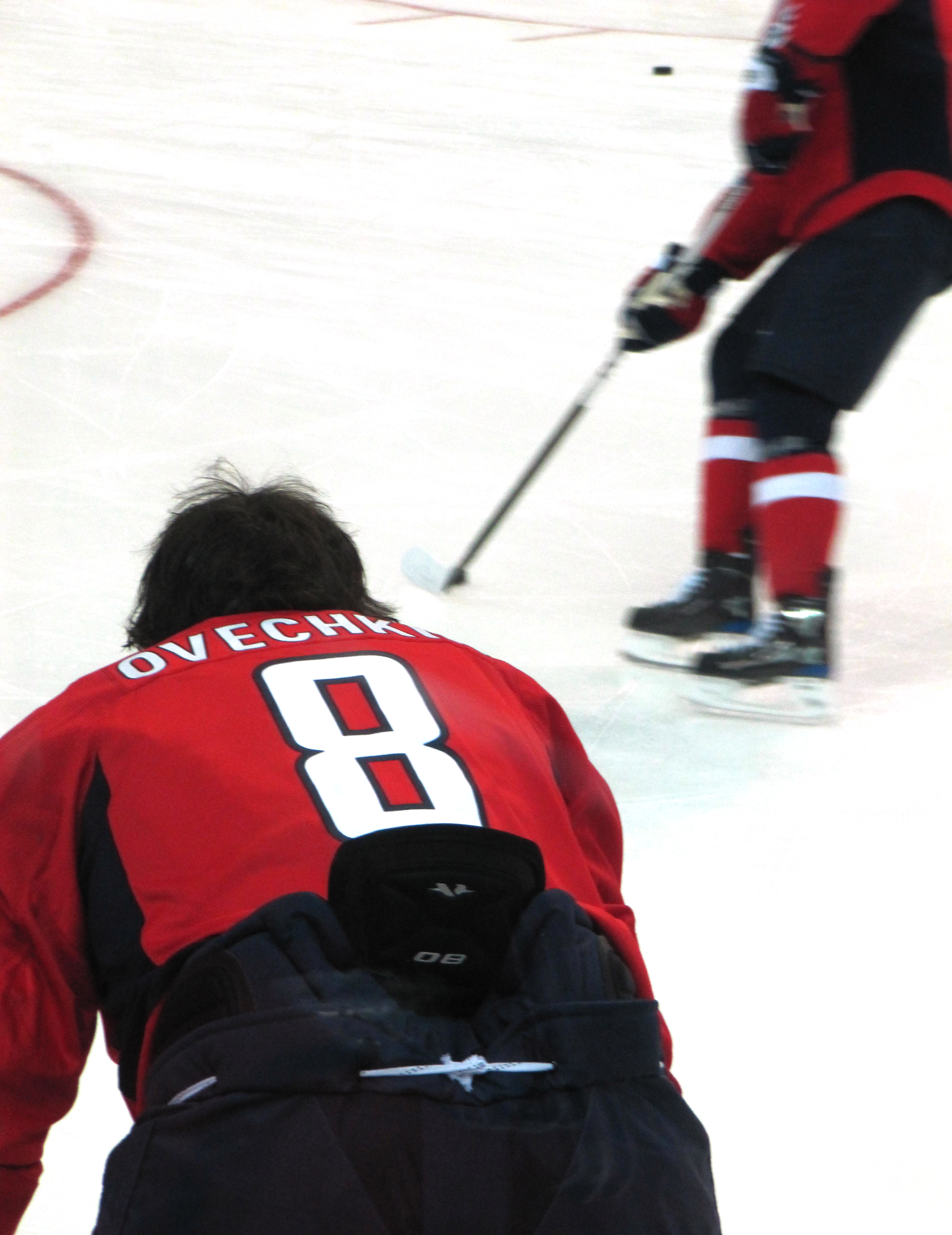
Alexander Ovechkin with a tucked-in jersey during a 2010 Washington Capitals game

The tuck rule is a rule by the National Hockey League (NHL) that stipulates that jerseys must be worn over protective equipment, not tucked into pants.

== Rule description ==
The official rule by the National Hockey League is as follows:

NHL Rule 9.5. All protective equipment, except gloves, headgear, and goaltenders' leg guards must be worn under the uniform. Should it be brought to the attention of the referee that a player is wearing, for example, an elbow pad that is not covered by his jersey, he shall instruct the player to cover up the pad and a second violation by the same player would result in a minor penalty being assessed.
Rule 9.5 governs all protective equipment, including pants. Players are not permitted to tuck their jersey into their pants in such a manner where the top padding of the pants and/or additional body protection (affixed to the pants or affixed to the player's body) is exposed outside the jersey. The back uniform number must not be covered or obstructed in any fashion by protruding pads or other protective padding."

The NHL decided to newly enforce uniform policies starting with the 2013–14 season. As a result, players are not allowed to tuck their jerseys into their pants, expose their elbow pads, or make any other modifications to their jerseys.

Violations of this rule (which is called the "jersey tuck rule") are as follows:

- A player who does not follow the jersey tuck rule is to be issued a warning on the first offence.
- A player who commits the offence a second time is to be assessed a minor penalty for delay of game.
- A player who commits the offence a third time is to receive a misconduct.
- A player who commits the offence a fourth time is to receive a game misconduct.

It was originally unclear if the minor penalty will be called for delay of game or an equipment violation. But in the first instance, Alexander Semin was assessed with delay of game.

== Enforcement ==
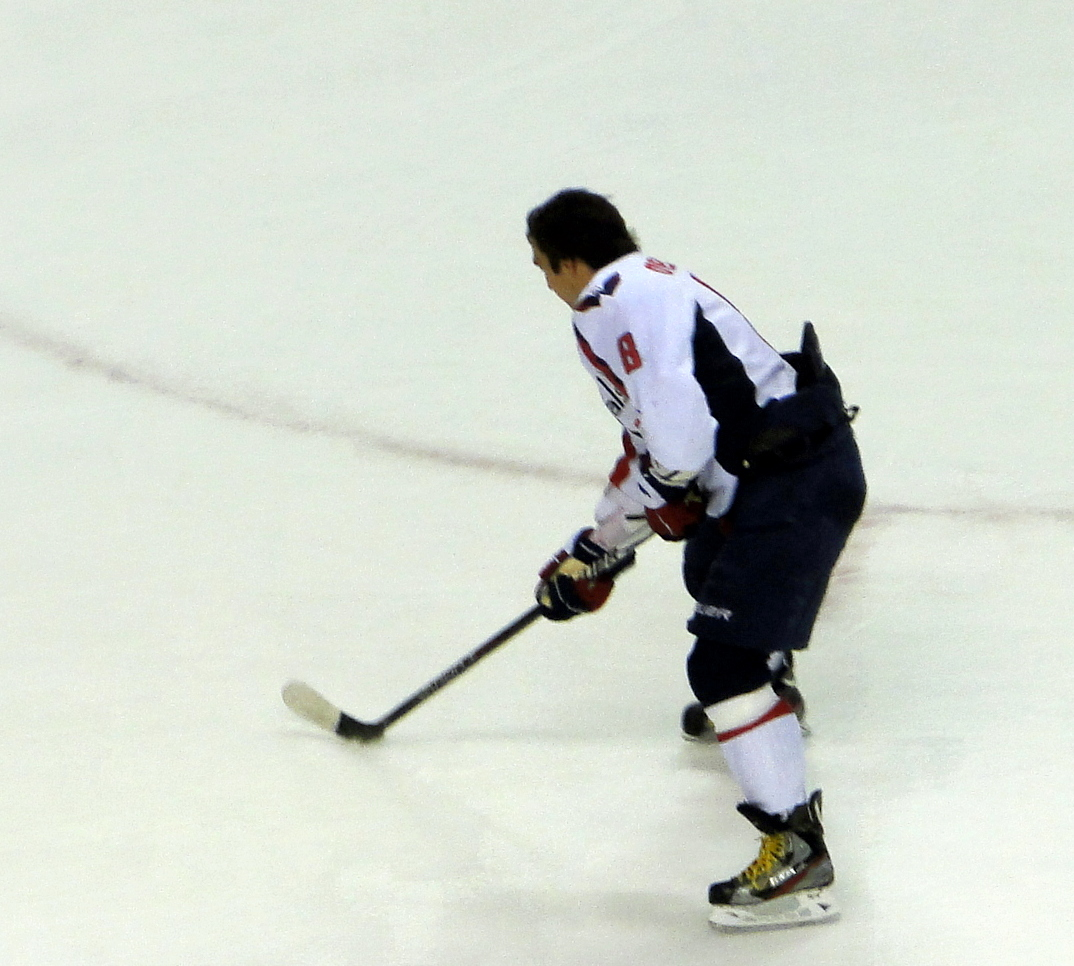
Alexander Ovechkin in 2012

Although these policies have existed since 1964, they were not enforced until general managers voted to enforce it in the 2013–14 season. Some reporters suggested that enforcing uniform rules was the National Hockey League's attempt to reduce freak accidents where a player's body was cut by skate blade while others said the league was laying down rules for eventually selling advertising space that would display prominently on the entire jersey. In a September 2013 pre-season game between the Carolina Hurricanes and the Columbus Blue Jackets, Alexander Semin became the first player penalized for this infraction. After receiving an official's initial warning in that game, his jersey became tucked in again after scoring the second goal in that game. He received the minor penalty 15 minutes later for violating the tuck rule a second time in the game. In response, Semin later stitched his jersey to his pants. However, by early October in the same year, it was reported that the league's hockey operations department would relax on enforcing the tuck rule. The penalty would not be enforced if the jersey was tucked in while skating as long as the jersey was untucked at the beginning of a shift.

The rule brings the league in line with other hockey leagues and tournaments, such as the Olympics.

== Reception ==
Reactions to enforcement of the tuck rule by NHL players and coaches were overwhelmingly negative. Alexander Ovechkin called the rule "stupid". Former Washington Capitals head coach Adam Oates also disagreed with the rule, saying that for superstar players like Wayne Gretzky and Ovechkin tucking in their jerseys were part of their identity. Toronto Maple Leafs player Joffrey Lupul questioned the rule while Morgan Rielly said he was not aware of this rule until the Semin penalty. Boston Bruins centre Patrice Bergeron, often seen with his jersey tucked underneath his protective pants, said he did not do it intentionally but felt that it could become an issue during regular season games.
