= Greg Biekert =

American football player and coach (born 1969)

No. 54
- Position: Linebacker

Personal information
- Born: March 14, 1969 (age 57); Iowa City, Iowa, U.S.
- Listed height: 6 ft 2 in (1.88 m)
- Listed weight: 255 lb (116 kg)

Career information
- High school: Longmont
- College: Colorado
- NFL draft: 1993: 7th round, 181st overall pick

Career history

Playing
- Los Angeles/Oakland Raiders (1993–2001); Minnesota Vikings (2002–2003)

Coaching
- Oakland Raiders (2010–2011) Linebackers coach

Awards and highlights
- National champion (1990); 2× First-team All-Big Eight (1991, 1992)

Career NFL statistics
- Tackles: 1,093
- Sacks: 16
- Interceptions: 7
- Stats at Pro Football Reference

Gregory Scott Biekert (born March 14, 1969) is an American football coach and former linebacker in the National Football League (NFL).

Biekert attended Longs Peak Middle School and Longmont High School in Longmont, Colorado, where he lettered in football. He was a standout linebacker for the Colorado Buffaloes.

Pre-draft measurables
Height	Weight	Arm length	Hand span	40-yard dash	10-yard split	20-yard split	20-yard shuttle	Vertical jump	Broad jump	Bench press
6 ft 2 1/2 in (1.89 m)	231 lb (105 kg)	31 1/8 in (0.79 m)	10 1/4 in (0.26 m)	4.80 s	1.72 s	2.86 s	4.29 s	30.5 in (0.77 m)	9 ft 1 in (2.77 m)	23 reps

After college, he was drafted by the then L.A. Raiders in the seventh round (181st overall) of the 1993 NFL draft and played in 176 games with 155 starts. He led the Raiders in tackles for six seasons, including four straight years (1998–2001). He recovered the Tom Brady incomplete pass that was called because of the disputed and since overturned Tuck rule in the 2001 AFC divisional playoff game against the New England Patriots which Tom Brady admitted might have been a fumble in May 2022. After two full seasons with the Minnesota Vikings, Biekert retired after the 2003 season.

Biekert rejoined the Raiders as an assistant coach on defense on July 27, 2010. He was promoted to linebackers coach on February 8, 2011. He resigned to focus on family following the 2011 season. He was the coach at Timnath Middle High School in Timnath, Colorado.
