= 1995 Buffalo Bills season =

36th season in franchise history

- Owner: Ralph Wilson
- General manager: John Butler
- Head coach: Marv Levy; Elijah Pitts (interim)
- Offensive coordinator: Tom Bresnahan
- Defensive coordinator: Wade Phillips
- Home stadium: Rich Stadium

Results
- Record: 10–6
- Division place: 1st AFC East
- Playoffs: Won Wild Card Playoffs (vs. Dolphins) 37–22; Lost Divisional Playoffs (at Steelers) 21–40
- Pro Bowlers: DE Bruce Smith; OLB Bryce Paup; ST Steve Tasker

The 1995 Buffalo Bills season was the franchise's 26th season in the National Football League and the 36th overall. This was the last time the Bills won the division or won a playoff game until 2020.

After suffering a losing season the previous season, the 1995 Bills won the AFC East, and made the playoffs for the seventh time in eight seasons. They defeated the Miami Dolphins 37–22 in the Wild Card Game in Don Shula's final game as an NFL head coach. The following week they lost to the eventual AFC Champions, the Pittsburgh Steelers 40–21.

In his first season with the team, defensive end Bryce Paup was named NFL Defensive Player of the Year. Paup led the NFL with 17.5 sacks, the fourth-highest single-season total of the 1990s. During the season, head coach Marv Levy underwent successful treatment for prostate cancer; assistant Elijah Pitts filled in as interim coach until Levy returned after a three-game absence.

== Offseason ==
Additions	Subtractions
LB Bryce Paup (Packers)	WR Don Beebe (Panthers)
NT Ted Washington (Broncos)	TE Pete Metzelaars (Panthers)
DE Jim Jeffcoat (Cowboys)	DE Oliver Barnett (49ers)
	S Mike Dumas (Jaguars)
	LB Darryl Talley (Falcons)
	LB Marvcus Patton (Redskins)
	NT Jeff Wright (retirement)
	NT Mike Lodish (Broncos)

=== 1995 expansion draft ===
Buffalo Bills selected during the expansion draft
Round	Overall	Name	Position	Expansion team
5	9	Keith Goganious	Linebacker	Jacksonville Jaguars
23	46	Vince Marrow	Tight End	Carolina Panthers

=== NFL draft ===
1995 Buffalo Bills draft
Round	Pick	Player	Position	College	Notes
1	14	Ruben Brown *	Guard	Pittsburgh	
2	45	Todd Collins	Quarterback	Michigan	
3	76	Marlon Kerner	Cornerback	Ohio State	
3	96	Damien Covington	Linebacker	NC State	
4	109	Ken Irvin	Cornerback	Memphis	
4	113	Justin Armour	Wide receiver	Stanford	
4	131	Tony Cline	Tight end	Stanford	
5	144	John Holecek	Linebacker	Illinois	
6	185	Shannon Clavelle	Defensive tackle	Colorado	
7	221	Tom Nütten	Center	Western Michigan	
7	244	Darick Holmes	Running back	Portland State	
Made roster * Made at least one Pro Bowl during career

=== Undrafted free agents ===
1995 undrafted free agents of note
Player	Position	College
Jason Anderson	Wide receiver	Eastern Washington
Carey Bender	Running back	Coe College
Travis Colquitt	Punter	Marshall
Eric Counts	Defensive tackle	NC State
Herve Damas	Linebacker	Hofstra
Randall Evans	Wide receiver	St. Augustine's (NC)
Che Foster	Fullback	Michigan
Myron Glass	Cornerback	Northern Iowa
Steve Harvey	Linebacker	Kansas
Michael Hendricks	Linebacker	Texas A&M
Adrian Hill	Wide Receiver	NC State
Terry Quinn	Safety	Louisville
Mike Sheldon	Guard	Grand Valley State

== Personnel ==
=== Staff ===
1995 Buffalo Bills staff
Front office: President – Ralph Wilson; Executive Vice President and General Manager – John Butler; Vice President of Football Operations – Marv Levy; Director of Pro Personnel – A. J. Smith; Director of Player Personnel – Dwight Adams; Head coaches: Head Coach – Marv Levy; Assistant Head Coach – Elijah Pitts; Administrative Assistant to the Head Coach – Chuck Lester; Offensive coaches: Offensive Coordinator/Offensive Line – Tom Bresnahan; Quarterbacks – Jim Shofner; Running Backs – Elijah Pitts; Receivers – Charlie Joiner; Offensive Quality Control/Tight Ends – Don Lawrence	Defensive coaches: Defensive Coordinator – Wade Phillips; Defensive Line – Dan Sekanovich; Linebackers – Ted Cottrell; Assistant Linebackers – Chuck Lester; Defensive Backs – Dick Roach; Special teams coaches: Special Teams – Bruce DeHaven; Strength and conditioning: Strength and Conditioning Coordinator – Rusty Jones

=== Roster ===
1995 Buffalo Bills roster
Quarterbacks (QB): 15 Todd Collins; 12 Jim Kelly; 10 Alex Van Pelt; Running backs (RB): 35 Carwell Gardner FB; 44 Darick Holmes KR; 30 Yonel Jourdain KR; 34 Thurman Thomas; 33 Tim Tindale FB; Wide receivers (WR): 81 Justin Armour; 80 Bill Brooks; 85 Russell Copeland; 83 Andre Reed; 89 Steve Tasker PR; 82 Damon Thomas; Tight ends (TE): 88 Tony Cline; 87 Rob Coons; 84 Lonnie Johnson	Offensive linemen (OL): 79 Ruben Brown G; 62 Mike Devlin C; 70 John Fina T; 67 Kent Hull C; 68 Corbin Lacina G; 72 Corey Louchiey T; 64 Tom Nütten G; 60 Jerry Ostroski G; 74 Glenn Parker T; Defensive linemen (DL): 90 Phil Hansen DE; 77 Jim Jeffcoat; 75 Ed Philion NT; 94 Mark Pike DE; 78 Bruce Smith DE; 92 Ted Washington NT; 73 Karl Wilson DE	Linebackers (LB): 97 Cornelius Bennett ILB; 96 Monty Brown ILB; 57 Damien Covington ILB; 52 John Holecek ILB; 95 Bryce Paup OLB; 58 Marlo Perry ILB; 59 Sam Rogers OLB; 50 David White OLB; Defensive backs (DB): 43 Matt Darby FS; 41 Greg Evans SS; 42 Chris Green CB/S; 27 Ken Irvin CB; 39 Filmel Johnson CB; 20 Henry Jones SS; 46 Marlon Kerner CB; 24 Kurt Schulz FS; 28 Thomas Smith CB; Special teams (ST): 2 Steve Christie K; 63 Adam Lingner LS; 9 Chris Mohr P	Practice squad: 45 Carey Bender RB; 71 Mike Sheldon G; Reserve: 22 Jeff Burris CB/PR (IR); 54 Herve Damas LB (IR); 53 Steve Harvey LB (IR); 55 Mark Maddox LB (IR); 53 active, 4 inactive, 2 practice squad Rookies in italics

== Regular season ==
=== Schedule ===
Week	Date	Opponent	Result	Record	Venue	Attendance
1	September 3	at Denver Broncos	**L** 7–22	0–1	Mile High Stadium	75,157
2	September 10	Carolina Panthers	**W** 31–9	1–1	Rich Stadium	79,190
3	September 17	**Indianapolis Colts**	**W** 20–14	2–1	Rich Stadium	62,499
4	Bye					
5	October 2	at Cleveland Browns	**W** 22–19	3–1	Cleveland Municipal Stadium	76,211
6	October 8	**New York Jets**	**W** 29–10	4–1	Rich Stadium	79,485
7	October 15	Seattle Seahawks	**W** 27–21	5–1	Rich Stadium	74,362
8	October 23	at **New England Patriots**	**L** 14–27	5–2	Foxboro Stadium	60,203
9	October 29	at **Miami Dolphins**	**L** 6–23	5–3	Joe Robbie Stadium	71,060
10	November 5	at **Indianapolis Colts**	**W** 16–10	6–3	RCA Dome	59,612
11	November 12	Atlanta Falcons	**W** 23–17	7–3	Rich Stadium	62,690
12	November 19	at **New York Jets**	**W** 28–26	8–3	Giants Stadium	54,436
13	November 26	**New England Patriots**	**L** 25–35	8–4	Rich Stadium	69,384
14	December 3	at San Francisco 49ers	**L** 17–27	8–5	Candlestick Park	65,568
15	December 10	at St. Louis Rams	**W** 45–27	9–5	Trans World Dome	64,623
16	December 17	**Miami Dolphins**	**W** 23–20	10–5	Rich Stadium	79,531
17	December 24	Houston Oilers	**L** 17–28	10–6	Rich Stadium	45,253
Note: Intra-division opponents are in **bold** text.

=== Season summary ===
==== Week 1 at Broncos ====
Week One: Buffalo Bills (0–0) at Denver Broncos (0–0)

Quarter	1	2	3	4	Total
Bills	7	0	0	0	**7**
**Broncos**	3	9	0	10	**22**

at Mile High Stadium, Denver, Colorado

- Date: September 3, 1995
- Game time: 8:00 p.m. EDT
- Game weather: Clear, 76 °F (24 °C)
- Game attendance: 75,157
- TV announcers (TNT): Verne Lundquist, Pat Haden, and Craig Sager
- Box Score, Box Score

Game information

**First quarter**

- DEN – Jason Elam 22-yard field goal, 12:32. Broncos 3–0. **Drive: 5 plays, 51 yards.**
- BUF – Andre Reed 34-yard pass from Jim Kelly (Steve Christie kick), 8:43. Bills 7–3. **Drive: 7 plays, 70 yards.**

**Second quarter**

- DEN – Jason Elam 52-yard field goal, 14:55. Bills 7–6. **Drive: 5 plays, 19 yards.**
- DEN – Jason Elam 20-yard field goal, 8:25. Broncos 9–7. **Drive: 10 plays, 42 yards.**
- DEN – Jason Elam 38-yard field goal, 0:02. Broncos 12–7. **Drive: 10 plays, 54 yards.**

**Third quarter**

- No scoring

**Fourth quarter**

- DEN – Jason Elam 37-yard field goal, 10:23. Broncos 15–7. **Drive: 11 plays, 59 yards.**
- DEN – Terrell Davis 3-yard run (Jason Elam kick), 3:22. Broncos 22–7. **Drive: 9 plays, 84 yards.**

Top passers

- BUF – Jim Kelly – 12/28, 154 yards, TD
- DEN – John Elway – 22/41, 317 yards, INT

Top rushers

- BUF – Thurman Thomas – 17 rushes, 46 yards
- DEN – Terrell Davis – 20 rushes, 70 yards, TD

Top receivers

- BUF – Russell Copeland – 6 receptions, 75 yards
- DEN – Shannon Sharpe – 10 receptions, 180 yards

The Bills first game in Denver since 1977

==== Week 5 ====
Buffalo Bills (2–1) at Cleveland Browns (3–1)

Quarter	1	2	3	4	Total
Bills	10	0	3	9	**22**
Browns	7	3	6	3	**19**

at Cleveland Municipal Stadium • Cleveland, Ohio

- Date: October 2
- Game time: 9:00 p.m. EST
- Game weather: 67 °F (19.4 °C); wind 10 miles per hour (16 km/h; 8.7 kn)
- Game attendance: 76,211
- Referee: Gary Lane
- TV announcers (ABC Monday Night Football): Al Michaels, Frank Gifford, and Dan Dierdorf
- Pro-Football-Reference.com, The Football Database

Game information

Bills

- Jim Kelly
  27/34, 256 Yds, 2 TD, INT
- Thurman Thomas
  23 Rush, 86 Yds
- Andre Reed
  9 Rec, 97 Yds, TD

Browns

- Vinny Testaverde
  18/34, 224 Yds
- Derrick Alexander
  1 Rush, 29 Yds
- Andre Rison
  6 Rec, 126 Yds

Scoring summary

Quarter	Time	Drive			Team	Scoring information	Score	
Quarter	Time	Plays	Yards	TOP	Team	Scoring information	BUF	CLE
1	9:56				Bills	Armour 14-yard touchdown reception from Kelly, Christie kick good	7	0
1	6:49				Browns	Punt returned 69 yards for touchdown by Alexander, Stover kick good	7	7
1	0:50				Bills	38-yard field goal by Christie	10	7
2	0:18				Browns	32-yard field goal by Stover	10	10
3	11:10				Bills	31-yard field goal by Christie	13	10
3	6:59				Browns	47-yard field goal by Stover	13	13
3	3:56				Browns	23-yard field goal by Stover	13	16
4	6:30				Bills	Reed 41-yard touchdown reception from Kelly, Christie kick no good	19	16
4	3:49				Browns	38-yard field goal by Stover	19	19
4	0:05				Bills	33-yard field goal by Christie	22	19
"TOP" = time of possession. For other American football terms, see Glossary of American football.							22	19

==== Week 6 ====
Starting QBs -> New York Jets: Boomer Esiason / Buffalo Bills: Jim Kelly

Vegas Line: Buffalo Bills −9.5 /// Over/Under: 38.0 (over)

Thurman Thomas becomes the 11th player all-time to go over the 9,000 career rushing yard mark in this game.

Boomer Esiason was knocked out in the second quarter by Bruce Smith, thus putting Bubby Brister into the game. On his first snap in the game, he fumbled the ball and turned it over to Buffalo.

New York Jets (1–4) at Buffalo Bills (3–1)

Team	1	2	3	4	Total
Jets	0	3	7	0	10
• Bills	3	13	3	10	29

- Date: Oct 8, 1995
- Location: Rich Stadium, Orchard Park, New York
- Game start: 1:00 p.m. EST
- Game attendance: 79,485
- Game weather: 54 °F (12 °C) • 15 miles per hour (24 km/h; 13 kn)
- Referee: Bob McElwee
- TV announcers (NFL on NBC): Marv Albert and Cris Collinsworth

Scoring summary

Quarter	Time	Drive			Team	Scoring information	Score	
Quarter	Time	Plays	Yards	TOP	Team	Scoring information	NYJ	BUF
1	5:46	8	60	2:53	Bills	38-yard field goal by Steve Christie	0	3
2	7:57	4	4	2:09	Jets	26-yard field goal by Nick Lowery	3	3
2	3:58	11	68	3:59	Bills	24-yard field goal by Steve Christie	3	6
2	0:26	7	39	1:44	Bills	32-yard field goal by Steve Christie	3	9
2	0:16	1	15	0:05	Bills	Bill Brooks 15-yard touchdown reception from Jim Kelly, Steve Christie kick good	3	16
3	9:03	11	57	5:57	Jets	Wayne Chrebet 16-yard touchdown reception from Bubby Brister, Nick Lowery kick good	10	16
3	7:16	5	23	1:47	Bills	51-yard field goal by Steve Christie	10	19
4	9:51	12	77	5:30	Bills	Thurman Thomas 1-yard touchdown run, Steve Christie kick good	10	26
4	5:56	6	20	2:12	Bills	27-yard field goal by Steve Christie	10	29
"TOP" = time of possession. For other American football terms, see Glossary of American football.							10	29

Team	Category	Player	Statistics
Jets	Passing	Bubby Brister	13/23, 112 yards, 1 TD, 1 INT
Jets	Rushing	Adrian Murrell	14 carries, 33 yards
Jets	Receiving	Wayne Chrebet	7 receptions, 74 yards, 1 TD
Bills	Passing	Jim Kelly	9/22, 101 yards, 1 TD, 1 INT
Bills	Rushing	Thurman Thomas	27 carries, 133 yards, 1 TD
Bills	Receiving	Russell Copeland	5 receptions, 67 yards

Statistics	Jets	Bills
First downs	14	22
Plays–yards	53–173	67–318
Rushes–yards	21–51	45–220
Passing yards	122	98
Passing: comp–att–int	17–32–2	9–22–1
Turnovers		
Time of possession	31:49	28:11

==== Week 10 ====
Elijah Pitts was the Buffalo Bills head coach for this game as Marv Levy was recovering from illness.

Starting QBs: Buffalo Bills: Jim Kelly vs Indianapolis Colts: Jim Harbaugh.

In this game, Jim Harbaugh started, but midway through the first quarter Paul Justin was put in by coach Ted Marchibroda as Harbaugh was injured. This wasn't the end for the Colts QB situation, as Justin was hit by Bryce Paup knocking him out of the game. Harbaugh came in briefly after Justin was knocked out, however, Craig Erickson came into the game to finish it out.

Vegas Line: Indianapolis Colts −4.0

Buffalo Bills (5–3) at Indianapolis Colts (5–3)

Team	1	2	3	4	Total
• Bills	10	6	0	0	16
Colts	7	0	3	0	10

- Date: November 5
- Location: RCA Dome, Indianapolis, Indiana
- Game start: 4:00 p.m. EST
- Game attendance: 59,612
- Game weather: DOME
- Referee: Larry Nemmers
- TV announcers (NFL on NBC): Tom Hammond and Cris Collinsworth

Scoring summary

Quarter	Time	Drive			Team	Scoring information	Score	
Quarter	Time	Plays	Yards	TOP	Team	Scoring information	BUF	IND
1	11:24	2	51	0:49	Bills	Bill Brooks 51-yard touchdown reception from Kelly, Christie kick good	7	0
1	7:50	8	76	3:30	Colts	Marshall Faulk 4-yard touchdown run, Cary Blanchard kick good	7	7
1	1:56	4	2	1:13	Bills	39-yard field goal by Steve Christie	10	7
2	9:04	5	74	2:29	Bills	23-yard field goal by Steve Christie	13	7
2	3:52	9	43	3:45	Bills	33-yard field goal by Steve Christie	16	7
3	10:24	5	40	1:42	Colts	37-yard field goal by Cary Blanchard	16	10
"TOP" = time of possession. For other American football terms, see Glossary of American football.							16	10

==== Week 11 ====
Team	1	2	3	4	Total
Falcons	7	3	7	0	17
• Bills	7	7	6	3	23

- Date: November 12
- Location: Rich Stadium, Orchard Park, New York
- Game start: 1:00 p.m. EST
- Game attendance: 62,690
- Game weather: 32 °F (0 °C) • 26 miles per hour (42 km/h; 23 kn)
- Referee: Johnny Grier
- TV announcers (Fox NFL): Thom Brennaman, Ron Pitts, and Eric Clemons (Sideline Reporter)

==== Week 12 ====
Starting QBs -> New York Jets: Boomer Esiason / Buffalo Bills: Jim Kelly

Vegas Line: Buffalo Bills −6.5 /// Over/Under: 37.0 (over)

Boomer Esiason throws a last second hail mary TD pass to Adrian Murrell, however, failed on the 2-pt conversion to send the game into OT.

Buffalo Bills (7–3) at New York Jets(2–8)

Team	1	2	3	4	Total
• Bills	7	14	7	0	28
Jets	3	0	10	13	26

- Date: Nov 19, 1995
- Location: Giants Stadium East Rutherford, New Jersey
- Game start: 4:00pm EST
- Game attendance: 54,436
- Game weather: 46 °F (8 °C) • 6 miles per hour (9.7 km/h; 5.2 kn)
- Referee: Dick Hantak
- TV announcers (NFL on NBC): Marv Albert and Cris Collinsworth

Scoring summary

Quarter	Time	Drive			Team	Scoring information	Score	
Quarter	Time	Plays	Yards	TOP	Team	Scoring information	BUF	NYJ
1	8:46	10	58		Jets	30-yard field goal by Nick Lowery	0	3
1	1:35	5	59	1:36	Bills	Bill Brooks 45-yard touchdown reception from Jim Kelly, Steve Christie kick good	7	3
2	6:37	17	90	6:33	Bills	Thurman Thomas 12-yard touchdown run, Steve Christie kick good	14	3
2	2:26	8	52	1:47	Bills	Bill Brooks 18-yard touchdown reception from Jim Kelly, Steve Christie kick good	21	3
"TOP" = time of possession. For other American football terms, see Glossary of American football.							28	26

Team	Category	Player	Statistics
Bills	Passing	Jim Kelly	22/37, 316 yards, 2 TD
Bills	Rushing	Thurman Thomas	18 carries, 43 yards, 1 TD
Bills	Receiving	Bill Brooks	7 receptions, 107 yards, 2 TD
Jets	Passing	Boomer Esiason	24/43, 312 yards, 3 TD, 2 INT
Jets	Rushing	Adrian Murrell	9 carries, 36 yards
Jets	Receiving	Johnny Mitchell	5 receptions, 87 yards, 1 TD

Statistics	Bills	Jets
First downs	20	17
Plays–yards	73–373	65–351
Rushes–yards	36–88	22–74
Passing yards	285	277
Passing: comp–att–int	22–37–0	24–43–2
Turnovers		
Time of possession	31:12	28:48

==== Week 15 ====
Team	1	2	3	4	Total
• Bills	7	14	14	10	45
Rams	10	3	3	11	27

- Date: December 10
- Location: TWA Dome, St. Louis, Missouri
- Game start: 1:00 p.m. EST
- Game attendance: 64,623
- Game weather: DOME
- Referee: Gordon McCarter
- TV announcers (NFL on NBC): Marv Albert, Cris Collinsworth

Scoring summary
Q1	8:59	BUF	Bill Brooks 23 yard pass from Jim Kelly (Steve Christie kick)	BUF 7–0
Q1	5:29	STL	Todd Kinchen 6 yard pass from Mark Rypien (Dean Biasucci kick)	Tie 7–7
Q1	3:15	STL	(Dean Biasucci 28 yard field goal)	STL 10–7
Q2	7:52	BUF	Thurman Thomas 1 yard pass from Jim Kelly (Steve Christie kick)	BUF 14–10
Q2	5:29	BUF	Darick Holmes 1 yard run (Steve Christie kick)	BUF 21–10
Q2	0:00	STL	(Dean Biasucci 37 yard field goal)	BUF 21–13
Q3	6:29	BUF	Steve Tasker 6 yard pass from Jim Kelly(Steve Christie kick)	BUF 28–13
Q3	4:34	STL	(Dean Biasucci 51 yard field goal)	BUF 28–16
Q3	1:08	BUF	Steve Tasker 28 yard pass from Jim Kelly(Steve Christie kick)	BUF 35–16
Q4	6:52	STL	(Dean Biasucci 25 yard field goal)	BUF 35–19
Q4	6:40	BUF	Darick Holmes 38 yard run (Steve Christie kick)	BUF 42–19
Q4	3:54	STL	Jessie Hester 5 yard pass from Mark Rypien, Johnny Bailey pass from Mark Rypien	BUF 42–27
Q4	1:10	BUF	(Steve Christie 28 yard field goal	BUF 45–27

=== Standings ===
AFC East
	W	L	T	PCT	PF	PA	STK
^{(3)} Buffalo Bills	10	6	0	.625	350	335	L1
^{(5)} Indianapolis Colts	9	7	0	.563	331	316	W1
^{(6)} Miami Dolphins	9	7	0	.563	398	332	W1
New England Patriots	6	10	0	.375	294	377	L2
New York Jets	3	13	0	.188	233	384	L4

== Playoffs ==
=== AFC Wild Card Game ===
Buffalo Bills 37, Miami Dolphins 22

Quarter	1	2	3	4	Total
Dolphins	0	0	0	22	22
Bills	10	14	3	10	37

at Rich Stadium, Orchard Park, New York

- Date: December 30, 1995
- Game time: 12:30 p.m. EST
- Game weather: 30 °F (−1 °C), cloudy
- Game attendance: 73,103
- Referee: Red Cashion
- TV announcers (ABC): Brent Musburger and Dick Vermeil

In Buffalo's first playoff game since losing Super Bowl XXVIII two seasons earlier, the Bills handled Miami easily by a score of 37–22 at Rich Stadium. Although Dolphins quarterback Dan Marino completed 33 out of 64 passes for 422 yards and two touchdowns, the Bills jumped to a 27–0 lead going into the fourth quarter, and rushed for an NFL playoff-record 341 yards, led by Thurman Thomas's 25 carries for 158 yards. The Bills forced four turnovers, including intercepting Marino three times, in the victory. It was the final game of Don Shula's coaching career with the Dolphins, but the only Bills game ever attended by brothers John & Steve Gorczyca.

=== AFC Divisional Playoff ===
Pittsburgh Steelers 40, Buffalo Bills 21

Quarter	1	2	3	4	Total
Bills	0	7	7	7	21
Steelers	7	16	3	14	40

at Three Rivers Stadium, Pittsburgh

- Date: January 6, 1996
- Game time: 12:30 p.m. EST
- Game weather: 21 °F (−6 °C), clear
- Game attendance: 59,072
- Referee: Larry Nemmers
- TV announcers (NBC): Marv Albert and Cris Collinsworth

In the third all-time postseason meeting between the two teams, running back Bam Morris scored two touchdowns in the fourth quarter as the Steelers stopped the Bills from pulling off a comeback. Pittsburgh jumped to a 20–0 lead by the second quarter with running back John L. Williams's 1-yard touchdown, quarterback Neil O'Donnell's 10-yard touchdown pass to wide receiver Ernie Mills, and two field goals by Norm Johnson. However, Buffalo running back Thurman Thomas scored a 1-yard touchdown run with 45 seconds left in the first half. But Johnson made a 34-yard field goal with eight seconds left to give the Steelers a 23–7 halftime lead. In the third quarter, Johnson added a 39-yard field goal before Bills tight end Tony Cline caught a 2-yard touchdown reception. With 11:23 left in the game, Thomas scored on a 9-yard touchdown reception to cut the lead to 26–21. In response, Pittsburgh drove 76 yards to score on Morris' 13-yard touchdown run. Linebacker Levon Kirkland then intercepted a pass to set up Morris' 2-yard score with 1:58 remaining to clinch the victory. Bruce Smith was inactive for the game because he had the flu.

== Awards and honors ==
- Bryce Paup, NFL Defensive Player of the Year
- Bryce Paup, AFC Pro Bowl selection
