= 1997 Buffalo Bills season =

38th season in franchise history; final one with coach Marv Levy

- Owner: Ralph Wilson
- General manager: John Butler
- Head coach: Marv Levy
- Home stadium: Rich Stadium

Results
- Record: 6–10
- Division place: 4th AFC East
- Playoffs: Did not qualify
- Pro Bowlers: G Ruben Brown; DE Bruce Smith; DT Ted Washington

The 1997 Buffalo Bills season was their 38th in the league. The team failed to improve upon their previous season's output of 10–6, instead falling to 6–10. They missed the playoffs for only the second time in ten seasons. 1997 was Hall of Fame head coach Marv Levy's final year as the team's head coach, and the first season since 1985 when Jim Kelly was not on the opening day roster. Todd Collins started at quarterback for the Bills in their first season in the post-Kelly era. The Bills also signed Oakland's Billy Joe Hobert to challenge Collins for the starting job. Third-string quarterback Alex Van Pelt also saw playing time with three starts in Collins' absence.

Hobert's contract was terminated after Week Seven, in which Hobert was backing up an injured Collins, and after the game revealed to the media that he had not studied the playbook. Hobert was released the next day.

One of the most memorable regular season games in Buffalo Bills history occurred in Week Four against the Indianapolis Colts. The Colts roared to a 26–0 lead in the second quarter, before the Bills went on a 37–3 run, ultimately taking the lead 37–29 with 1:15 remaining in the game. The Colts closed to within two, but missed a two-point conversion, giving Buffalo a two-point victory. The game remains the third-greatest regular season comeback in NFL history, (Note: It has been surpassed only by a 33-point comeback by the 2022 Vikings and a 28-point comeback by the 1980 49ers) and the second greatest in team history. (Note: Surpassed only by "The Comeback" in the 1992 playoffs)

== Offseason ==
Prior to the 1997 season, long-time quarterback (and future Hall of Famer) Jim Kelly announced his retirement from professional football. This left the Bills forced to find a different opening day starting quarterback for the first time since 1985. Third-year quarterback Todd Collins started the season, and the Bills signed former Raiders quarterback Billy Joe Hobert, whose contract was terminated after a Week Seven loss to New England.

=== NFL draft ===
| = Pro Bowler (Note: Players are identified as a Pro Bowler if they were selected for the Pro-Bowl at any time in their career.) |

One notable player that was not drafted by the Bills, but debuted for the team in 1997, was future Pro Bowl defensive tackle Pat Williams, who played with the team for eight seasons.

1997 Buffalo Bills Draft
| Round | Selection | Player | Position | College | Notes |
|---|---|---|---|---|---|
| 1 | 23 | Antowain Smith | RB | Houston | |
| 2 | 52 | Marcellus Wiley (Note: Made Pro Bowl with San Diego in 2001) | DE | Columbia | |
| 4 | 120 | Jamie Nails | OL | Florida A&M | |
| 5 | 153 | Sean Woodson | DB | Jackson State | |
| 6 | 185 | Marcus Spriggs | G | Houston | |
| 7 | 226 | Pat Fitzgerald | TE | Texas | |

== Roster ==
1997 Buffalo Bills roster
| Quarterbacks (QB): 13 Jim Ballard; 15 Todd Collins; 10 Alex Van Pelt; Running backs (RB): 44 Darick Holmes KR; 25 Rene Ingoglia; 23 Antowain Smith; 34 Thurman Thomas; Wide receivers (WR): 88 Quinn Early; 82 Mitchell Galloway; 80 Eric Moulds KR; 81 Jerry Reese; 89 Steve Tasker PR; Tight ends (TE): 86 Tony Cline; 87 Rob Coons; 84 Lonnie Johnson; 85 Jay Riemersma | Offensive linemen (OL): 79 Ruben Brown G; 63 Bill Conaty C; 70 John Fina T; 68 Corbin Lacina G; 72 Corey Louchiey T; 74 Jamie Nails G; 60 Jerry Ostroski T; 73 Mike Rockwood T; 69 Marcus Spriggs T; 61 Dusty Zeigler C; Defensive linemen (DL): 90 Phil Hansen DE; 94 Mark Pike DE; 91 Shawn Price DE; 78 Bruce Smith DE; 92 Ted Washington NT; 75 Marcellus Wiley DE; 93 Pat Williams NT | Linebackers (LB): 96 Dan Brandenburg OLB; 52 John Holecek ILB; 55 Mark Maddox ILB; 98 Sean Moran ILB; 99 Gabe Northern OLB; 95 Bryce Paup OLB; 58 Marlo Perry OLB; 59 Sam Rogers OLB; Defensive backs (DB): 22 Jeff Burris CB/PR; 27 Ken Irvin CB; 31 Raymond Jackson FS; 20 Henry Jones SS; 21 Manny Martin CB; 24 Kurt Schulz FS; 40 Eric Smedley SS; 28 Thomas Smith CB; 37 Sean Woodson SS; Special teams (ST): 76 Ethan Albright LS; 2 Steve Christie K; 9 Chris Mohr P | Practice squad: 97 Doug Brown NT; Reserve: 57 Damien Covington LB (IR); 48 Pat Fitzgerald TE (IR); 77 Jim Jeffcoat NT (IR); 46 Marlon Kerner CB (IR); 83 Andre Reed WR (IR); 54 Chris Spielman LB (IR); 33 Tim Tindale FB (IR); 53 active, 7 inactive, 1 practice squad Rookies in italics |

== Schedule ==
| Week | Date | Opponent | Result | Record | Venue | Attendance |
|---|---|---|---|---|---|---|
| 1 | August 31 | Minnesota Vikings | **L** 34–13 | 0–1 | Rich Stadium | 79,139 |
| 2 | September 7 | at **New York Jets** | **W** 28–22 | 1–1 | Giants Stadium | 72,988 |
| 3 | September 14 | at Kansas City Chiefs | **L** 16–22 | 1–2 | Arrowhead Stadium | 78,169 |
| 4 | September 21 | **Indianapolis Colts** | **W** 37–35 | 2–2 | Rich Stadium | 55,340 |
| 5 | Bye | | | | | |
| 6 | October 5 | Detroit Lions | **W** 22–13 | 3–2 | Rich Stadium | 78,025 |
| 7 | October 12 | at **New England Patriots** | **L** 6–33 | 3–3 | Foxboro Stadium | 59,802 |
| 8 | October 20 | at **Indianapolis Colts** | **W** 9–6 | 4–3 | RCA Dome | 61,139 |
| 9 | October 26 | Denver Broncos | **L** 20–23 | 4–4 | Rich Stadium | 78,458 |
| 10 | November 2 | **Miami Dolphins** | **W** 9–6 | 5–4 | Rich Stadium | 78,011 |
| 11 | November 9 | **New England Patriots** | **L** 10–31 | 5–5 | Rich Stadium | 65,783 |
| 12 | November 17 | **at Miami Dolphins** | **L** 13–30 | 5–6 | Pro Player Stadium | 74,155 |
| 13 | November 23 | at Tennessee Oilers | **L** 14–31 | 5–7 | Liberty Bowl Memorial Stadium | 23,571 |
| 14 | November 30 | **New York Jets** | **W** 20–10 | 6–7 | Rich Stadium | 47,776 |
| 15 | December 7 | at Chicago Bears | **L** 3–20 | 6–8 | Soldier Field | 39,784 |
| 16 | December 14 | Jacksonville Jaguars | **L** 14–20 | 6–9 | Rich Stadium | 41,231 |
| 17 | December 20 | at Green Bay Packers | **L** 31–21 | 6–10 | Lambeau Field | 60,108 |
Note: Intra-divisional games are in **bold** text.

== Game summaries ==
=== Week 2 ===
| Team | 1 | 2 | 3 | 4 | Total |
|---|---|---|---|---|---|
| • Bills | 0 | 14 | 7 | 7 | 28 |
| Jets | 3 | 10 | 6 | 3 | 22 |

- Date: September 7
- Location: Giants Stadium, East Rutherford, New Jersey
- Game start: 1:00 p.m.
- Game attendance: 72,988
- Game weather: 73 °F (22.8 °C), wind 9 mph (14 km/h; 7.8 kn)
- TV announcers (NBC): Marv Albert, Randy Cross & Len Berman

Scoring summary
| 1 | NYJ | John Hall 27 yard field goal | Jets 3–0 |
| 2 | NYJ | Dedric Ward 19 yard pass from Neil O'Donnell (John Hall kick) | Jets 10–0 |
| 2 | BUF | Thurman Thomas 2 yard run (Steve Christie kick) | Jets 10–7 |
| 2 | BUF | Andre Reed 10 yard pass from Todd Collins (Steve Christie kick) | Bills 14–10 |
| 2 | NYJ | John Hall 19 yard field goal | Bills 14–13 |
| 3 | BUF | Quinn Early 19 yard pass from Todd Collins (Steve Christie kick) | Bills 21–13 |
| 3 | NYJ | Aaron Glenn 96 yard kickoff return (run failed) | Bills 21–19 |
| 4 | NYJ | John Hall 52 yard field goal | Jets 22–21 |
| 4 | BUF | Jay Riemersma 10 yard pass from Todd Collins (Steve Christie kick) | Bills 28–22 |

=== Week 3 ===
Starting QBs - Buffalo Bills: Todd Collins / Kansas City Chiefs: Elvis Grbac

Vegas Line: Kansas City Chiefs -4.5

Over/Under: 40.0 (under)

Buffalo Bills (1-1) at Kansas City Chiefs (1-1)

| Team | 1 | 2 | 3 | 4 | Total |
|---|---|---|---|---|---|
| Bills | 0 | 3 | 7 | 6 | 16 |
| • Chiefs | 6 | 3 | 0 | 13 | 22 |

- Date: Sep 14, 1997
- Location: Arrowhead Stadium, Kansas City, Missouri
- Game start: 1:00 PM EST
- Game attendance: 78,169
- Game weather: 72 °F (22.2 °C) • 6 miles per hour (9.7 km/h; 5.2 kn)
- Referee: Tom White (American football official)
- TV announcers (NFL on NBC): Mike Breen and James Lofton

Scoring summary

| Quarter | Time | Drive | | | Team | Scoring information | Score | |
| Quarter | Time | Plays | Yards | TOP | Team | Scoring information | BUF | KC |
|---|---|---|---|---|---|---|---|---|
| 1 | 8:20 | 11 | 54 | 5:03 | Chiefs | 46-yard field goal by Pete Stoyanovich | 0 | 3 |
| 1 | 1:08 | 6 | 30 | 2:38 | Chiefs | 45-yard field goal by Pete Stoyanovich | 0 | 6 |
| 2 | 7:49 | 9 | 32 | 3:30 | Bills | 46-yard field goal by Steve Christie | 3 | 6 |
| 2 | 1:03 | 9 | 47 | 1:07 | Chiefs | 42-yard field goal by Pete Stoyanovich | 3 | 9 |
| 3 | 12:15 | 2 | 86 | 0:48 | Bills | Andre Reed 77-yard touchdown reception from Todd Collins, Steve Christie kick good | 10 | 9 |
| 4 | 14:29 | 6 | 57 | 1:58 | Bills | 33-yard field goal by Steve Christie | 13 | 9 |
| 4 | 14:13 | 1 | 94 | 0:16 | Chiefs | Kickoff returned 94 yards for touchdown by Tamarick Vanover, Pete Stoyanovich kick good | 13 | 16 |
| 4 | 11:52 | 5 | 49 | 2:21 | Bills | 30-yard field goal by Steve Christie | 16 | 16 |
| 4 | 9:50 | 6 | 50 | 1:24 | Chiefs | Tony Richardson 1-yard touchdown reception from Elvis Grbac, Pete Stoyanovich kick no good (blocked) | 16 | 22 |
| "TOP" = time of possession. For other American football terms, see Glossary of American football. | | | | | | | 16 | 22 |

| Team | Category | Player | Statistics |
|---|---|---|---|
| Bills | Passing | Todd Collins | 22/43, 297 yards, 1 TD, 2 INT |
| Bills | Rushing | Antowain Smith | 11 carries, 30 yards |
| Bills | Receiving | Andre Reed | 4 receptions, 113 yards, 1 TD |
| Chiefs | Passing | Elvis Grbac | 20/37, 179 yards, 1 TD |
| Chiefs | Rushing | Greg Hill | 17 carries, 59 yards |
| Chiefs | Receiving | Andre Rison | 5 receptions, 75 yards |

| Statistics | Bills | Chiefs |
|---|---|---|
| First downs | 16 | 17 |
| Plays–yards | 66-325 | 62-267 |
| Rushes–yards | 23-50 | 25-107 |
| Passing yards | 275 | 160 |
| Passing: comp–att–int | 22-43-2 | 20-37-0 |
| Turnovers | | |
| Time of possession | 31:32 | 28:28 |

== Standings ==
AFC East
| | W | L | T | PCT | PF | PA | STK |
|---|---|---|---|---|---|---|---|
| ^{(3)} New England Patriots | 10 | 6 | 0 | .625 | 369 | 289 | W1 |
| ^{(6)} Miami Dolphins | 9 | 7 | 0 | .563 | 339 | 327 | L2 |
| New York Jets | 9 | 7 | 0 | .563 | 348 | 287 | L1 |
| Buffalo Bills | 6 | 10 | 0 | .375 | 255 | 367 | L3 |
| Indianapolis Colts | 3 | 13 | 0 | .188 | 313 | 401 | L1 |
