= 1994 Buffalo Bills season =

35th season in franchise history

- Owner: Ralph Wilson
- General manager: John Butler
- Head coach: Marv Levy
- Home stadium: Rich Stadium

Results
- Record: 7–9
- Division place: 4th AFC East
- Playoffs: Did not qualify
- Pro Bowlers: WR Andre Reed; WR Steve Tasker; DE Bruce Smith

The 1994 Buffalo Bills season was the 35th season for the team franchise and the 25th in the National Football League. The Bills entered the season as the four-time defending AFC champions and looked to advance to the playoffs for the seventh consecutive season and to the Super Bowl for the fifth consecutive season- and to finally win a Super Bowl.

However, for the first time since 1987, the Bills failed to make the playoffs. Buffalo finished at 7–9 for the year, only good enough for fourth place in the AFC East. Going into Week 14 the Bills were still in postseason contention, before losing their final three games and finishing the season with a losing record for the first time since the aforementioned strike-shortened 1987 season.

== Offseason ==
Additions	Subtractions
QB Rick Strom (Steelers)	T Howard Ballard (Seahawks)
	CB James Williams (Cardinals)
	QB Gale Gilbert (Chargers)
	G Jim Ritcher (Falcons)

=== NFL draft ===
1994 Buffalo Bills draft
Round	Selection	Player	Position	College	Notes
1	27	Jeff Burris	CB	Notre Dame	
2	48	Bucky Brooks	CB	North Carolina	
2	61	Lonnie Johnson	TE	Florida State	
2	64	Sam Rogers	LB	Colorado	
3	81	Marlo Perry	LB	Jackson State	
3	98	Corey Louchiey	OT	South Carolina	
4	130	Sean Crocker	DB	North Carolina	
5	158	A. J. Ofodile	TE	Missouri	
6	188	Anthony Abrams	DT	Clark Atlanta	
6	192	Kevin Knox	WR	Florida State	
6	221	Filmel Johnson	DB	Illinois	

=== Undrafted free agents ===
1994 undrafted free agents of note
Player	Position	College
John Bock	Center	Indiana State
Mike Collins	Safety	West Virginia
Todd Herget	Linebacker	BYU
Steve Hoyem	Tackle	Stanford

== Personnel ==
=== Staff/coaches ===
1994 Buffalo Bills staff
Front office
- President – Ralph Wilson
- Vice president of administration/general manager – John Butler
- Assistant general manager/director of pro personnel – Bob Ferguson
- Director of player personnel – John Butler
- Assistant director/collegiate scouting – A. J. Smith
- Summer intern – Tom Telesco

Coaching staff

- Vice president for football operations/head coach – Marv Levy
- Assistant head coach - Elijah Pitts
- Administrative assistant to the head coach – Chuck Lester

Offensive coaches

- Offensive coordinator/offensive line – Tom Bresnahan
- Quarterbacks coach – Jim Shofner
- Running backs coach – Elijah Pitts
- Receivers coach – Charlie Joiner
- Offensive quality control/tight ends – Don Lawrence

Defensive coaches

- Defensive coordinator/linebackers – Walt Corey
- Defensive line – Dan Sekanovich
- Defensive backs – Dick Roach
- Linebackers coach - Walt Corey
- Assistant linebackers coach – Chuck Lester

Special teams

- Special teams – Bruce DeHaven

Strength & conditioning

- Strength and conditioning coordinator – Rusty Jones

=== Roster ===
1994 Buffalo Bills roster
Quarterbacks: 14 Frank Reich; 11 Rick Strom; 10 Alex Van Pelt; Running backs: 23 Kenneth Davis; 35 Carwell Gardner FB; 30 Yonel Jourdain KR; 34 Thurman Thomas; 33 Tim Tindale FB; 21 Nate Turner FB; Wide receivers: 82 Don Beebe KR; 80 Bill Brooks; 85 Russell Copeland KR; 83 Andre Reed; 16 Damon Thomas; Tight ends: 84 Lonnie Johnson; 87 Vince Marrow; 88 Pete Metzelaars	Offensive linemen: 66 Jerry Crafts T/G; 65 John Davis G; 62 Mike Devlin C; 70 John Fina T; 76 Steve Hoyem T; 67 Kent Hull C; 63 Adam Lingner C/LS; 72 Corey Louchiey T; 60 Jerry Ostroski G; 74 Glenn Parker T; Defensive linemen: 77 Oliver Barnett DE; 90 Phil Hansen DE; 73 Mike Lodish NT; 99 James Patton DE; 94 Mark Pike DE; 78 Bruce Smith DE; 91 Jeff Wright NT	Linebackers: 97 Cornelius Bennett OLB; 50 Keith Goganious ILB; 55 Mark Maddox ILB; 53 Marvcus Patton ILB; 58 Marlo Perry OLB; 59 Sam Rogers OLB; 56 Darryl Talley OLB; Defensive backs: 22 Jeff Burris CB/PR; 43 Matt Darby FS; 38 Mike Dumas FS; 41 Greg Evans SS; 36 Jerome Henderson CB; 39 Filmel Johnson CB; 20 Henry Jones SS; 24 Kurt Schulz FS; 28 Thomas Smith CB; 25 Mickey Washington CB; Special teams: 2 Steve Christie K; 9 Chris Mohr P	Reserve lists: 81 Bucky Brooks WR/KR (IR); 96 Monty Brown LB (IR); 12 Jim Kelly QB (IR); 68 Corbin Lacina G (IR); 86 A. J. Ofodile TE (PUP); 71 Ed Philion DT (IR); 89 Steve Tasker WR (IR); Practice squad
* Note: Rookies in Italics 53 active, 7 inactive

== Regular season ==
=== Schedule ===
Week	Date	Opponent	Result	Record	Venue	Recap
1	September 4	**New York Jets**	**L** 3–23	0–1	Rich Stadium	Recap
2	September 11	at **New England Patriots**	**W** 38–35	1–1	Foxboro Stadium	Recap
3	September 18	at Houston Oilers	**W** 15–7	2–1	Astrodome	Recap
4	September 26	Denver Broncos	**W** 27–20	3–1	Rich Stadium	Recap
5	October 2	at Chicago Bears	**L** 13–20	3–2	Soldier Field	Recap
6	October 9	**Miami Dolphins**	**W** 21–11	4–2	Rich Stadium	Recap
7	October 16	**Indianapolis Colts**	**L** 17–27	4–3	Rich Stadium	Recap
8	Bye					
9	October 30	Kansas City Chiefs	**W** 44–10	5–3	Rich Stadium	Recap
10	November 6	at **New York Jets**	**L** 17–22	5–4	Giants Stadium	Recap
11	November 14	at Pittsburgh Steelers	**L** 10–23	5–5	Three Rivers Stadium	Recap
12	November 20	Green Bay Packers	**W** 29–20	6–5	Rich Stadium	Recap
13	November 24	at Detroit Lions	**L** 21–35	6–6	Pontiac Silverdome	Recap
14	December 4	at **Miami Dolphins**	**W** 42–31	7–6	Joe Robbie Stadium	Recap
15	December 11	Minnesota Vikings	**L** 17–21	7–7	Rich Stadium	Recap
16	December 18	**New England Patriots**	**L** 17–41	7–8	Rich Stadium	Recap
17	December 24	at **Indianapolis Colts**	**L** 9–10	7–9	RCA Dome	Recap
Note: Intra-division opponents are in **bold** text.

=== Game summaries ===
==== Week 1 ====
Pete Carroll's debut as a head coach with the New York Jets.

Team	1	2	3	4	Total
• Jets	0	17	3	3	23
Bills	3	0	0	0	3

- Date: September 4
- Location: Rich Stadium Orchard Park, New York
- Game start: 4:00 PM EST
- Game attendance: 79,460
- Game weather: 57 °F (14 °C) • 8 miles per hour (13 km/h; 7.0 kn)
- Referee: Gerald Austin
- TV announcers (NFL on NBC): Marv Albert and Paul Maguire

==== Week 2 ====
Week Two: Buffalo Bills (0–1) at New England Patriots (0–1)

Quarter	1	2	3	4	Total
Bills	14	14	0	10	**38**
Patriots	7	7	7	14	**35**

at Foxboro Stadium • Foxborough, Massachusetts

- Date: September 11
- Game time: 1:00 p.m. EDT
- Game weather: 62 °F (17 °C) • Wind 15 miles per hour (24 km/h; 13 kn)
- Game attendance: 60,274
- Referee: Dale Hamer
- TV announcers (NBC): Don Criqui and Beasley Reece
- Pro-Football-Reference.com, The Football Database

Game information

Bills

- Jim Kelly
  25/41, 328 Yds, 4 TD, 3 INT
- Thurman Thomas
  26 Rush, 106 Yds
- Andre Reed
  7 Rec, 142 Yds, TD

Patriots

- Drew Bledsoe
  26/42, 380 Yds, 3 TD, 2 INT
- Marion Butts
  18 Rush, 82 Yds, 2 TD
- Ben Coates
  9 Rec, 124 Yds, 2 TD

Scoring summary

Quarter	Time	Drive			Team	Scoring information	Score	
Quarter	Time	Plays	Yards	TOP	Team	Scoring information	BUF	NE
1	12:38	8	80		Bills	Andre Reed 37-yard touchdown reception from Jim Kelly, Steve Christie kick good	7	0
1	6:58	11	89		Bills	Thurman Thomas 4-yard touchdown reception from Jim Kelly, Steve Christie kick good	14	0
1	0:07	6	42		Patriots	Ben Coates 18-yard touchdown reception from Drew Bledsoe, Matt Bahr kick good	14	7
2	12:04	9	77		Bills	Bill Brooks 12-yard touchdown reception from Jim Kelly, Steve Christie kick good	21	7
2	2:58	10	88		Patriots	Ben Coates 5-yard touchdown reception from Drew Bledsoe, Matt Bahr kick good	21	14
2	1:13	6	78		Bills	Don Beebe 14-yard touchdown reception from Jim Kelly, Steve Christie kick good	28	14
3	12:33	1	19		Patriots	Marion Butts 19-yard touchdown run, Matt Bahr kick good	28	21
4	14:07				Bills	Fumble recovery in end zone for touchdown by Mike Lodish, Steve Christie kick good	35	21
4	9:17	3	23		Patriots	Michael Timpson 12-yard touchdown reception from Drew Bledsoe, Matt Bahr kick good	35	28
4	9:22	5	69		Patriots	Marion Butts 6-yard touchdown run, Matt Bahr kick good	35	35
4	0:52	8	53		Bills	32-yard field goal by Steve Christie	38	35
"TOP" = time of possession. For other American football terms, see Glossary of American football.							38	35

==== Week 3 ====
In a game that featured the old American Football League helmets, the Houston Oilers starting QB for this game was Bucky Richardson.

Buffalo Bills (1-1) at Houston Oilers (0-2)

Team	1	2	3	4	Total
• Bills	0	9	3	3	15
Oilers	0	0	0	7	7

- Date: September 18
- Location: Astrodome Houston, Texas
- Game start: 1:00pm EST
- Game attendance: 55,424
- Game weather: DOME
- Referee: Ron Blum
- TV announcers (NFL on NBC): Charlie Jones (sportscaster) and Randy Cross

==== Week 4 ====
Team	1	2	3	4	Total
Broncos	0	7	10	3	20
• Bills	3	14	7	3	27

- Date: September 26
- Location: Rich Stadium
- Game start: 9:00
- Game attendance: 75,373
- Referee: Bob McElwee
- TV announcers (ABC): Frank Gifford, Al Michaels, Dan Dierdorf, and Lynn Swann (Sideline Reporter)

==== Week 5 ====
Buffalo Bills (3-1) at Chicago Bears (2-2)

Team	1	2	3	4	Total
Bills	3	3	7	0	13
• Bears	0	7	3	10	20

- Date: October 2
- Location: Soldier Field Chicago, Illinois
- Game start: 4:00 PM EST
- Game attendance: 62,406
- Game weather: 56 °F (13 °C) • 16 miles per hour (26 km/h; 14 kn)
- Referee: Ed Hochuli
- TV announcers (NFL on NBC): Dick Enberg, Bob Trumpy, and Hannah Storm

==== Week 6 ====
Team	1	2	3	4	Total
Dolphins	3	0	0	8	11
• Bills	0	7	7	7	21

- Date: October 9
- Location: Rich Stadium Orchard Park, New York
- Game start: 1:00 PM EST
- Game attendance: 79,491
- Game weather: 61 °F (16 °C) • 20 miles per hour (32 km/h; 17 kn)
- Referee: Jerry Markbreit
- TV announcers (NFL on NBC): Dick Enberg, Bob Trumpy, and Hannah Storm

==== Week 7 ====
Team	1	2	3	4	Total
• Colts	3	7	7	10	27
Bills	7	3	0	7	17

- Date: October 16
- Location: Rich Stadium
- Game start: 1:00
- TV announcers (NBC): Tom Hammond and Cris Collinsworth

==== Week 9 ====
Team	1	2	3	4	Total
Chiefs	7	0	3	0	10
• Bills	14	17	3	10	44

- Date: October 30
- Location: Rich Stadium
- Game start: 1:00
- Game attendance: 79,501
- Game weather: 58 degrees, wind 14 mph
- Referee: Gordon McCarter
- TV announcers (NBC): Dick Enberg, Bob Trumpy, and Hannah Storm (Sideline Reporter)

==== Week 10 ====
Team	1	2	3	4	Total
Bills	0	14	0	3	17
• Jets	3	7	6	6	22

- Date: November 6
- Location: Giants Stadium
- Game start: 4:00
- Referee: Howard Roe
- TV announcers (NBC): Dick Enberg, Bob Trumpy, and Hannah Storm

==== Week 11 ====
Team	1	2	3	4	Total
Bills	0	3	7	0	10
• Steelers	10	6	7	0	23

- Date: November 14
- Location: Three Rivers Stadium - Pittsburgh, Pennsylvania
- Game start: 9:00 PM EST
- Game attendance: 59,019
- Game weather: 58 °F (14 °C) • 10 miles per hour (16 km/h; 8.7 kn)
- Referee: Ed Hochuli
- TV announcers (Monday Night Football, ABC): Frank Gifford, Al Michaels, Dan Dierdorf, and Lynn Swann (sideline reporter)

==== Week 12 ====
Team	1	2	3	4	Total
Packers	0	6	14	0	20
• Bills	14	13	0	2	29

- Date: November 20
- Location: Rich Stadium
- Game start: 1:00 PM EST
- Game attendance: 79,029
- Game weather: 41 °F (5.0 °C); wind 8 miles per hour (13 km/h; 7.0 kn)
- Referee: Johnny Grier
- TV announcers (FOX): Joe Buck and Tim Green

==== Week 13 ====
Thanksgiving Day Game

Team	1	2	3	4	Total
Bills	0	7	7	7	21
• Lions	7	14	0	14	35

- Date: November 24
- Location: Pontiac Silverdome
- Game start: 12:30 PM EST
- Game attendance: 75,67
- Game weather: Indoors (dome)
- Referee: Larry Nemmers
- TV announcers (NBC): Dick Enberg, Bob Trumpy, and Hannah Storm (sideline reporter)

==== Week 14 ====
Team	1	2	3	4	Total
• Bills	7	0	21	14	42
Dolphins	0	17	0	14	31

- Date: December 4, 1994
- Location: Joe Robbie Stadium, Miami, Florida
- Game start: 8:00 p.m. EST
- Game attendance: 69,358
- Game weather: 79 °F (26 °C) • 15 miles per hour (24 km/h; 13 kn)
- Referee: Bob McElwee
- TV announcers (ESPN Sunday Night Football): Mike Patrick, Joe Theismann, and Mark Malone (sideline reporter)

Scoring summary
Q1	BUF	Brooks 8 yard pass from Kelly (Christie kick)	BUF 7–0
Q2	MIA	Fryar 3 yard pass from Marino (Stoyanovich kick)	Tie 7–7
Q2	MIA	Stoyanovich 23 yard field goal	MIA 10–7
Q2	MIA	Fryar 45 yard pass from Marino (Stoyanovich kick)	MIA 17–7
Q3	BUF	Beebe 72 yard pass from Kelly (Christie kick)	MIA 17–14
Q3	BUF	Reed 21 yard pass from Kelly (Christie kick)	BUF 21–17
Q3	BUF	Gardner 1 yard run (Christie kick)	BUF 28–17
Q4	MIA	Jackson 23 yard pass from Marino (pass failed)	BUF 28–23
Q4	BUF	Gardner 1 yard run (Christie kick)	BUF 35–23
Q4	BUF	Reed 83 yard pass from Kelly (Christie kick)	BUF 42–23
Q4	MIA	Miller 1 yard pass from Kosar (Parmalee run)	BUF 42–31

==== Week 15 ====
Team	1	2	3	4	Total
• Vikings	3	6	3	9	21
Bills	7	3	7	0	17

- Date: December 11
- Location: Rich Stadium
- Game start: 1:00
- TV announcers (Fox): Thom Brennaman, Anthony Muñoz, and Kevin Frazier

==== Week 16 ====
Team	1	2	3	4	Total
• Patriots	3	14	14	10	41
Bills	10	7	0	0	17

- Date: December 18
- Location: Rich Stadium
- Game start: 1:00
- Referee: Red Cashion
- TV announcers (NBC): Marv Albert, Paul Maguire, and John Dockery (sideline reporter)

==== Week 17 ====
Team	1	2	3	4	Total
Bills	0	6	0	3	9
• Colts	0	0	10	0	10

- Date: December 24
- Location: Hoosier Dome
- Game start: 1:00
- TV announcers (NBC): Don Criqui and Beasley Reece

=== Standings ===
AFC East
	W	L	T	PCT	PF	PA	STK
^{(3)} Miami Dolphins	10	6	0	.625	389	327	W1
^{(5)} New England Patriots	10	6	0	.625	351	312	W7
Indianapolis Colts	8	8	0	.500	307	320	W2
Buffalo Bills	7	9	0	.438	340	356	L3
New York Jets	6	10	0	.375	264	320	L5
