= List of Buffalo Bills Pro Bowl selections =

This is a list of Buffalo Bills players who were elected to the Pro Bowl, the annual all-star game of the NFL. Pro Bowl rosters are determined by a combination of fan, player, and coach voting. In 1991, the Bills had a franchise record 10 players selected to the Pro Bowl.

The year indicates when the game was played, not the season that it followed.

== 2026–2020 ==
Year	Player
2026	Josh Allen (4)
2026	James Cook (3)
2026	Dion Dawkins (5)
2026	Dalton Kincaid
2025	Josh Allen (3)
2025	James Cook (2)
2025	Dion Dawkins (4)
2025	Connor McGovern
2024	James Cook (1)
2024	Dion Dawkins (3)
2024	Stefon Diggs (4)
2023	Josh Allen (2)
2023	Stefon Diggs (3)
2023	Dion Dawkins (2)
2023	Dawson Knox
2023	Matt Milano
2023	Rodger Saffold
2023	Jordan Poyer
2023	Mitch Morse
2022	Stefon Diggs (2)
2022	Dion Dawkins (1)
2021	Josh Allen (1)
2021	Stefon Diggs (1)
2021	Tremaine Edmunds (2)
2021	Tre'Davious White (2)
2021	Andre Roberts (2)
2020	Tremaine Edmunds (1)
2020	Tre'Davious White (1)
2020	Andre Roberts (1)

== 2019–2010 ==
Year	Player
2019	Kyle Williams (5)
2017	Micah Hyde
2017	LeSean McCoy (2)
2017	Richie Incognito (2)
2016	Tyrod Taylor
2016	LeSean McCoy (1)
2016	Eric Wood
2016	Richie Incognito (1)
2015	Kyle Williams (4)
2015	Mario Williams (2)
2015	Marcell Dareus (2)
2014	Kyle Williams (3)
2014	Jarius Byrd (3)
2014	Mario Williams
2014	Marcell Dareus
2013	Kyle Williams (2)
2013	C. J. Spiller
2013	Jarius Byrd (2)
2012	None selected
2011	Kyle Williams (1)
2010	Jarius Byrd (1)

== 2009–2000 ==
Year	Player
2009	Jason Peters (2)
2009	Marshawn Lynch
2008	Jason Peters (1)
2008	Aaron Schobel (2)
2007	Aaron Schobel (1)
2007	Brian Moorman (2)
2006	Mike Schneck
2006	Brian Moorman (1)
2005	Sam Adams
2005	Terrence McGee
2005	Nate Clements
2005	Takeo Spikes (2)
2004	Ruben Brown (8)
2004	Takeo Spikes (1)
2003	Drew Bledsoe
2003	Travis Henry
2003	Eric Moulds (2)
2003	Ruben Brown (7)
2002	Larry Centers
2002	Ruben Brown (6)
2001	Ruben Brown (5)
2001	Eric Moulds (1)
2001	Ted Washington (4)
2001	Sam Cowart
2000	Sam Gash (2)
2000	Ruben Brown (4)

== 1999–1990 ==
Year	Player
1999	Doug Flutie
1999	Sam Gash (1)
1999	Bruce Smith (11)
1999	Ruben Brown (3)
1999	Ted Washington (3)
1998	Ruben Brown (2)
1998	Bruce Smith (10)
1998	Ted Washington (2)
1997	Ruben Brown (1)
1997	Bruce Smith (9)
1997	Bryce Paup (2)
1997	Ted Washington (1)
1996	Bruce Smith (8)
1996	Bryce Paup (1)
1996	Steve Tasker (6)
1995	Andre Reed (7)
1995	Bruce Smith (7)
1995	Steve Tasker (5)
1994	Thurman Thomas (5)
1994	Howard Ballard (2)
1994	Andre Reed (6)
1994	Bruce Smith (6)
1994	Nate Odomes (2)
1994	Cornelius Bennett (5)
1994	Steve Tasker (4)
1993	Jim Kelly (5)
1993	Thurman Thomas (4)
1993	Andre Reed (5)
1993	Steve Tasker (3)
1993	Howard Ballard (1)
1993	Bruce Smith (5)
1993	Nate Odomes (1)
1993	Cornelius Bennett (4)
1992	Jim Kelly (4)
1992	Thurman Thomas (3)
1992	Andre Reed (4)
1992	James Lofton
1992	Jim Richter
1992	Darryl Talley (2)
1992	Henry Jones
1992	Cornelius Bennett (3)
1992	Steve Tasker (2)
1991	Kent Hull (3)
1991	Bruce Smith (4)
1991	Thurman Thomas (2)
1991	Darryl Talley (1)
1991	Andre Reed (3)
1991	Cornelius Bennett (2)
1991	Steve Tasker (1)
1991	Shane Conlan (3)
1991	Jim Kelly (3)
1991	Will Wolford
1990	Kent Hull (2)
1990	Thurman Thomas (1)
1990	Andre Reed (2)
1990	Bruce Smith (3)
1990	Shane Conlan (2)

== 1989–1980 ==
Year	Player
1989	Jim Kelly (2)
1989	Andre Reed (1)
1989	Kent Hull (1)
1989	Bruce Smith (2)
1989	Fred Smerlas (5)
1989	Cornelius Bennett (1)
1989	Shane Conlan (1)
1989	Scott Norwood
1988	Jim Kelly (1)
1988	Bruce Smith (1)
1987	None selected
1986	None selected
1985	Greg Bell
1984	Joe Cribbs (3)
1984	Fred Smerlas (4)
1983	Fred Smerlas (3)
1983	Ben Williams
1982	Joe Cribbs (2)
1982	Frank Lewis
1982	Fred Smerlas (2)
1981	Joe Cribbs (1)
1981	Jerry Butler
1981	Fred Smerlas (1)
1980	Joe DeLamielleure (5)

== 1979–1971 ==
Year	Player
1979	Joe DeLamielleure (4)
1978	Joe DeLamielleure (3)
1977	Joe DeLamielleure (2)
1977	O. J. Simpson (5)
1976	Joe DeLamielleure (1)
1976	O. J. Simpson (4)
1975	Robert James (3)
1975	O. J. Simpson (3)
1974	O. J. Simpson (2)
1974	Robert James (2)
1974	Dave Foley
1973	O. J. Simpson (1)
1973	Robert James (1)
1973	J. D. Hill
1972	None selected
1971	Marlin Briscoe

== 1969–1961 ==
=== AFL All-Star Game ===
Year	Player
1970	Jack Kemp (5)
1970	Butch Byrd (4)
1970	O. J. Simpson
1970	Billy Shaw (7)
1969	George Saimes (4)
1969	Butch Byrd (3)
1969	Mike Stratton (5)
1969	Billy Shaw (6)
1969	Jim Dunaway (3)
1968	Mike Mercer
1968	Keith Lincoln
1968	George Saimes (3)
1968	Tom Janik
1968	Mike Stratton (4)
1968	Billy Shaw (5)
1968	Ron McDole
1968	Stew Barber (4)
1968	Jim Dunaway (2)
1967	Jack Kemp (4)
1967	Bobby Burnett
1967	George Saimes (2)
1967	Wray Carlton
1967	Butch Byrd (2)
1967	John Tracey
1967	Mike Stratton (3)
1967	Billy Shaw (4)
1967	Stew Barber (3)
1967	Jim Dunaway (1)
1967	Paul Costa
1966	None (Bills vs. AFL All-Stars)
1965	Jack Kemp (3)
1965	George Saimes (1)
1965	Cookie Gilchrist (3)
1965	Butch Byrd (1)
1965	Elbert Dubenion
1965	Mike Stratton (2)
1965	Billy Shaw (3)
1965	Tom Sestak (3)
1965	Stew Barber (2)
1965	Ernie Warlick (3)
1964	Jack Kemp (2)
1964	Cookie Gilchrist (2)
1964	Willie West
1964	Mike Stratton (1)
1964	Billy Shaw (2)
1964	Tom Sestak (2)
1964	Stew Barber (1)
1964	Ernie Warlick (2)
1963	Jack Kemp (1)
1963	Cookie Gilchrist (1)
1963	Marv Matuszak
1963	Archie Matsos (2)
1963	Billy Shaw (1)
1963	Tom Sestak (1)
1963	Ernie Warlick (1)
1962	Bill Atkins
1962	Archie Matsos (1)
1962	Chuck McMurtry
1962	Harold Olson
1962	Ken Rice
1962	LaVerne Torczon
1961	No All-Star game held
