= John Holecek =

American football player (born 1972)

No. 52, 59
- Position: Linebacker

Personal information
- Born: May 7, 1972 (age 54); Steger, Illinois, U.S.
- Listed height: 6 ft 2 in (1.88 m)
- Listed weight: 242 lb (110 kg)

Career information
- High school: Marian Catholic (Chicago Heights, Illinois)
- College: Illinois
- NFL draft: 1995: 5th round, 144th overall pick

Career history
- Buffalo Bills (1995–2000); San Diego Chargers (2001); Atlanta Falcons (2002)

Awards and highlights
- First-team All-Big Ten (1993); Second-team All-Big Ten (1994); Chicago Sports Hall-of-Fame (2011)

Career NFL statistics
- Tackles: 380
- Sacks: 3.5
- Interceptions: 2
- Forced fumbles: 3
- Stats at Pro Football Reference

John Francis Holecek (born May 7, 1972) is an American football head coach football and former professional football player. He played linebacker for eight seasons in the National Football League (NFL) for the Buffalo Bills, the San Diego Chargers, and the Atlanta Falcons. He played college football at University of Illinois at Urbana-Champaign was later drafted by the Bills in 1995. Holecek also played for the Chargers in 2001 and the Falcons in 2002. Holecek was hired as the head football coach at Loyola Academy in 2006. Over his tenure, he became the winningest head coach in the school's history with Class 8A Illinois Football State Championships in 2015, 2018, and 2022. Holecek was a finalist for the 2015 National Coach of the Year award.

== Early life ==
Holecek was a three-sport athlete at Marian Catholic High School in Chicago Heights, Illinois, excelling in wrestling, baseball, and football.

Holecek played both tight end and middle linebacker for Marian coach Dave Mattio. He reflected on Holecek, commenting, "Even then, I saw how he never quit and everything had to be perfect. He was a tough kid, I compare him to street kid because of his toughness and being hard-nosed on the field. He played hard and the thing about John, he could run for a big guy."

Holecek finished his high school career with 243 tackles, 13 sacks, two fumble recoveries, three interceptions, two punts blocked on defense and special teams. He also accrued 16 receptions, 225 receiving yards, and 2 TD passes as a tight end.

Marian retired Holecek's No. 52 jersey in 2000.

== College career ==
After graduation from Marian Catholic, Holecek played for the Illinois Fighting Illini football team from 1990 to 1994. He was the Illini's co-Defensive Player of the Year in 1992. He made the All-Big in 1993 and 1994 teams, and was also a team captain. Holecek suffered multiple ACL injuries during his Illinois career.

Holecek was part of the linebacker foursome that gave Illinois the nickname "Linebacker U" in the 1990s. The Foursome also featured All-American and first-round, second and third overall draft picks, Simeon Rice and Kevin Hardy, as well as, Butkus award winner Dana Howard.

Holecek is fifth on the Illinois career tackles list with 436 and was twice named honorable mention All-America. He graduated with a degree in finance.

== Professional career ==
=== Buffalo Bills ===
Holecek was drafted in 1995 by the Buffalo Bills in the fifth round if the NFL draft (144th pick) of the 1995 NFL Draft. Holecek was drafted by Pro Football Hall of Fame coach Marv Levy and later played for coach Wade Phillips. He played six seasons with the Bills. He flourished as an inside linebacker in Phillips' defensive 3-4 system. He also briefly played middle linebacker in a 4–3 alignment when injuries caused Wade Phillips to switch defenses mid-season.

Holecek started eight games over the course of his first three seasons with the Bills (1995–1998). After playing in only one game his rookie season due to injury, Holecek suffered a knee injury suffered in the first preseason game forced him to spend the entire year on injured reserve. The injury necessitated reconstructive knee surgery. He pursued completion of his MBA degree while recovering.

In 1997, he recorded 58 combined tackles in 14 games, including eight starts.

In 1998, Holecek led the Bills with 78 tackles in his first season as a full-time starter and was named the team's recipient of the Ed Block Courage Award.

In 1999, he tallied 63 combined tackles, including 44 unassisted, to go along with one sack, one interception, six passes defensed and two forced fumbles.

In 2000, Holecek started in all 16 games and tallied a career-high 110 combined tackles with one interception.

The Bills, under a new general manager and head coach, released Holecek in July 2001 to alleviate their salary cap.

=== San Diego Chargers ===
Holecek signed with the San Diego Chargers on July 21, 2001. He appeared in 11 games for the Chargers before being placed on injury reserve due to knee injuries.

=== Atlanta Falcons ===
Holecek signed with the Atlanta Falcons in 2002. Holecek was reunited with Falcon defensive coordinator Wade Phillips, who tutored Holecek for six seasons while serving as defensive coordinator or head coach of the Buffalo Bills. He started the first 11 games Falcons and was the team's second leading tackler before breaking his arm. Holecek re-injured his right arm in the last game of the regular season that resulted in a career-ending wrist surgery.

=== NFL career statistics ===
Year	Team	Games		Tackles				Interceptions					Fumbles	
Year	Team	G	GS	Comb	Solo	Ast	Sack	Int	Yds	Lng	TD	PD	FF	FR
1995	BUF	1	0	5	3	2	0.0	—	—	—	—	—	0	—
1996	BUF	0	0	Did not play due to injury										
1997	BUF	14	8	58	38	20	1.5	—	—	—	—	—	1	0
1998	BUF	13	13	78	57	21	0.0	—	—	—	—	—	0	—
1999	BUF	14	14	63	44	19	1.0	1	35	35	0	6	2	0
2000	BUF	16	16	110	69	41	0.0	1	0	0	0	3	0	0
2001	SD	11	0	13	12	1	0.0	—	—	—	—	—	0	—
2002	ATL	12	11	53	43	10	1.0	—	—	—	—	—	0	0
Career		81	62	380	266	114	3.5	2	35	35	0	9	3	0

== Coaching career ==
After retiring from the NFL, Holecek returned to Illinois to work in finance and assist coaching high school football at St. Ignatius College Prep in Chicago. He joined Loyola Academy in 2006 as the head coach of the Ramblers football program. Holecek's former NFL coaches, Marv Levy and Wade Phillips, both vouched for him during his interview process at Loyola.

In 2008, Holecek coached Loyola to a Prep Bowl Championship at Soldier Field as the Loyola Academy Ramblers defeated Lane Tech, 17–0.

The 2009 team played in the state semi-finals.

The 2010 team was the start of Holecek's run on Chicago Catholic League Blue championships.

In 2011, he coached the Ramblers to a second-place finish in the Class 8A State Championship, losing to Bolingbrook High School 21–17 in inclement weather.

In August 2012, Holecek brought his Ramblers to Dublin, Ireland to play Jesuit Dallas in Global Ireland Football Tournament 2012, featuring Notre Dame vs Navy as the main draw.

Loyola was the 8A state championship runner-up in 2013, after losing to Naperville Central 13–10 in the title game.

Loyola won the Chicago Prep Bowl 14–7 over Chicago Curie at Soldier Field on November 28, 2014.

In 2015, Holecek became the fastest head coach in Illinois high school football history to win 100 games. At the close of the regular season in October, Loyola ranked No. 1 in the Illinois in all major football polls after completing a 9–0 undefeated regular season. In November, Loyola defeated the defending 8A champion Stevenson, Homewood Flossmor, and then Palatine in the Semi-Finals. Loyola defeated Marist 41–0 to win the IHSA class 8A State Championship, extending its season record to 14–0.

Loyola finished the regular 2016 season 9-0 and ranked #1 in the state as the Ramblers. At the end of October, Holecek's Ramblers ranked #5 nationally (USA Today Super 25 Computer Rankings) and had a 26-game win streak, plus had a 24-game home field winning streak that dates back to 2012. Loyola finished as runner-up in 2016 in class 8A.

Loyola finished the regular season at 8–1 in 2017 and the Ramblers won their third consecutive undefeated and outright Catholic Blue League title in a row.

Loyola's home win streak stood at 29 games, including a victory against perennial Californian powerhouse Bishop Amat. In early Nov 2017, Holecek became the school's all-time coaching leader with 133 wins.

In November 2018, Loyola Academy beat their first three playoff opponents, including two shutouts, and qualified for their ninth IHSA 8A semifinals in the last ten years. Loyola went on to beat Brother Rice 13–3 in the 8A final game on November 24. Underdogs Loyola beat the 14th, 6th (10-1 Maine South), 3rd (undefeated Oswego), 2nd (12-0 and reigning 8a champion Lincoln Way East) and 1st seeds (13-0 Brother Rice) during their playoff run.

Loyola won the 8A championship 13-3 over unbeaten Lincoln Way East at Illinois' Memorial Stadium in November 2022.

In early December 2022, Holecek announced that he would leave Loyola at the end of the school year when the last of his three sons would graduate. He was succeeded by former assistant Beau Desherow. Holecek's initial coaching run concluded with him having Loyola's all-time win record and the highest winning percentage (84%) amongst active Illinois high school coaches. His other accomplishments include: 185 wins, 9 Chicago Catholic Championships, 17 consecutive playoff appearances, 7 state finals appearances, and 3 championships. Holecek's teams qualified for the playoffs every year since 2006, including 16 IHSA State Playoff appearances. He led Loyola to four consecutive State Final games from 2015–2018. The NFL's PlayFootball regarded Holecek as one of the top high school football coaches in the country in 2021.

Holecek returned to Loyola in 2024 as an assistant coach. In 2024, Loyola defeated York Community High School to win a third-consecutive state championship.

Between March and June 2025, Holecek worked as the defensive coordinator for the Italian Football League's Milano Seamen.

In April 2026, Loyola Academy announced Holecek would return as the school's head coach. He finished the 2026 season with a 10–1 record. The Ramblers won two postseason games over Minooka and York before losing to fellow Jesuit rivals St. Ignatius College Prep in the quarterfinals.
