= Ted Washington =

American football player (born 1968)

No. 97, 98, 92
- Position: Nose tackle

Personal information
- Born: April 13, 1968 (age 58); Tampa, Florida, U.S.
- Listed height: 6 ft 5 in (1.96 m)
- Listed weight: 375 lb (170 kg)

Career information
- High school: Tampa Bay Technical (Tampa)
- College: Louisville (1987–1990)
- NFL draft: 1991: 1st round, 25th overall pick

Career history
- San Francisco 49ers (1991–1993); Denver Broncos (1994); Buffalo Bills (1995–2000); Chicago Bears (2001–2002); New England Patriots (2003); Oakland Raiders (2004–2005); Cleveland Browns (2006–2007)

Awards and highlights
- Super Bowl champion (XXXVIII); First-team All-Pro (2001); Second-team All-Pro (1997); 4× Pro Bowl (1997, 1998, 2000, 2001); Louisville Cardinals Ring of Honor

Career NFL statistics
- Tackles: 763
- Sacks: 34.5
- Forced fumbles: 8
- Fumble recoveries: 3
- Interceptions: 2
- Stats at Pro Football Reference

Theodore Washington Jr. (born April 13, 1968) is an American former professional football player who was a nose tackle in the National Football League (NFL). He played college football for the Louisville Cardinals and was selected by the San Francisco 49ers in the first round of the 1991 NFL draft. He also played for the Denver Broncos, Buffalo Bills, Chicago Bears, New England Patriots, Oakland Raiders, and Cleveland Browns before retiring after the 2007 season. Washington was selected to four Pro Bowls in his career and with the Patriots, he won Super Bowl XXXVIII over the Carolina Panthers. At 6'5" and more than 375 pounds in his prime, he was described as "the prototypical [3–4] nose tackle of this era." His gargantuan frame earned him nicknames like "Mt. Washington" or "Washington Monument". Also notable for his longevity, Washington was a starting nose tackle, one of the most physically demanding positions in football, until the age of 39.

== Early life ==
At Tampa Bay Technical High School in Tampa, Washington was a four-sport standout in football, track, baseball, and wrestling. As a senior, he was the Florida State Wrestling champion in the unlimited weight class.

== College career ==
As a senior at the University of Louisville, Washington had 76 tackles, seven sacks, and three blocked field goals, and was a 2nd team All-South Independent selection. He majored in physical education.

== Professional career ==
Pre-draft measurables
Height	Weight	Arm length	Hand span	Bench press
6 ft 4 1/4 in (1.94 m)	303 lb (137 kg)	34 1/2 in (0.88 m)	11 in (0.28 m)	16 reps

=== San Francisco 49ers ===
Washington was selected by the San Francisco 49ers in the first round (25th overall) in the 1991 NFL draft. He made his NFL debut at the New York Giants on September 2 and finished the season with 21 tackles and one sack. In his second season with the 49ers he played in 16 games and finished the season with 35 tackles and two sacks. The 1993 season was a progression from the previous season as Washington made 41 tackles and three sacks. Just as they had done in the previous year the 49ers made it to the NFC Championship Game.

Washington was also among the players who harassed 49ers head trainer Lindsy McLean, who is gay. In an ESPN Magazine article, McLean said that numerous 49ers humiliated him during his stint with the team, including one who made a habit of grabbing him from behind and simulating rape, saying, "Get over here, bitch. I know what you want." The behavior continued even after the player was traded to another team. McLean declined to name any of his harassers, but the Boston Globe later identified Washington as the perpetrator. Washington's agent, Angelo Wright, also confirmed that the player in question was his client.

=== Denver Broncos ===
On April 20, 1994, Washington was traded to the Denver Broncos. In his one and only year with the Broncos he started 15 games making 56 tackles and 2.5 sacks. The game versus the Cincinnati Bengals on November 27 was significant as it marked the start of a 119 consecutive game streak which would last until 2002.

=== Buffalo Bills ===
"Even though they're a pretty simple defense out of the 3–4, you have to prepare for those little slants and linebacker blitzes. They create some problems. Bruce Smith is still very active. He's quick. You try to cut him off and he jumps over people. Phil Hansen is a good player. But Ted Washington makes it tough to run up the middle. He's got to be close to 400 pounds."

— former New York Giants offensive line coach Jim McNally.

He was signed by the Buffalo Bills as an unrestricted free agent on February 24, 1995. Playing nose tackle, Washington lined up next to defensive end Bruce Smith in Buffalo's 3-4 defense. In his first season, he posted 86 tackles in 16 regular season games and two post season ones. In his second season with the Bills he recorded career numbers with 130 tackles. In the 1997 season, he recorded 124 tackles and four sacks. He was also selected to his first Pro Bowl. The following season, he was again selected to the Pro Bowl after finishing the year with 101 tackles and 4.5 sacks, which was a career high. In 1998, he again started in all 16 games and finished the season with 87 tackles. Washington was selected to do his third Pro Bowl in the 2000 season after recording 86 tackles and 2.5 sacks.

Following the 2000 NFL season, the Bills struggled to meet the salary-cap deadline. On February 22, Washington, who was scheduled to make about $7.6 million—including bonus money— in 2001, was cut in part because he refused to take a pay cut for the second straight year.

=== Chicago Bears ===
Washington was signed by the Chicago Bears as an unrestricted free agent on April 16, 2001. In his first season with the Bears he started in 15 games recording 50 tackles and 1.5 sacks and was selected to his fourth Pro Bowl. His second season with the Bears was ruined by injury as he only started in two games before being placed on injured reserve after suffering a fractured leg and torn ligament in his left foot.

=== New England Patriots ===
He was traded to the New England Patriots on August 20, 2003. He was part of a defense that was ranked 4th overall and finished the season with 45 tackles. He started and was part of the Patriots team who won Super Bowl XXXVIII.

=== Oakland Raiders ===
Washington was signed by the Oakland Raiders as an unrestricted free agent on March 3, 2004. He started all 16 games and finished the season with 41 tackles and three sacks. In 2005, his second season with the Raiders, he again started in all 16 games and recorded 44 tackles.

=== Cleveland Browns ===
He was signed by the Cleveland Browns as an unrestricted free agent on March 13, 2006. During the first play of training camp with the Browns in 2006, he was supposedly the one who injured the newly acquired all pro center LeCharles Bentley which was later denounced but when questioned about the incident he yelled at the reporters "It wasn't me who did it, I'll go see how he's doing later." In his first season with the Browns, just as he had done in eight other seasons he started in all 16 regular season games making 61 tackles. He finished the 2007 season with nine tackles. He decided to retire after he was released after the 2007–08 season. He weighed 375 pounds in his final NFL season, but he weighed up to 400 pounds at one point. In 2012, Washington was a nominee for the Pro Football Hall of Fame class of 2013.

=== NFL statistics ===
Year	Team	Games	Combined tackles	Tackles	Assisted tackles	Sacks	Forced fumbles	Fumble recoveries
1991	SF	16	0	0	0	1.0	0	0
1992	SF	16	0	0	0	2.0	0	0
1993	SF	12	38	35	3	3.0	0	1
1994	DEN	15	53	43	10	2.5	2	0
1995	BUF	16	53	42	11	2.5	0	0
1996	BUF	16	93	71	22	3.5	0	0
1997	BUF	16	80	61	19	4.0	1	1
1998	BUF	16	49	34	15	4.5	2	0
1999	BUF	16	45	35	10	2.5	0	0
2000	BUF	16	58	37	21	2.5	0	0
2001	CHI	16	33	26	7	1.5	0	1
2002	CHI	2	5	4	1	0.0	0	0
2003	NE	10	40	32	8	2.0	1	0
2004	OAK	16	41	33	8	3.0	1	0
2005	OAK	16	47	37	10	0.0	1	0
2006	CLE	16	52	43	9	0.0	0	0
2007	CLE	5	6	5	1	0.0	0	0
Career		236	693	538	155	34.5	8	3

== Personal life ==
He is the son of former Houston Oilers linebacker Ted Washington, Sr.
