= List of NFL Defensive Player of the Year awards =

Several organizations give out NFL Defensive Player of the Year awards. The Associated Press (AP) has been giving the award since 1972; Pro Football Writers of America/Pro Football Weekly since 1970; and Sporting News has announced winners since 2008. The Newspaper Enterprise Association was the originator of the award in 1966. However, it became defunct after 1997. Also going defunct was the United Press International (UPI) AFC–NFC Defensive Player of the Year Awards that began in 1975.

== Associated Press ==
The AP NFL Defensive Player of the Year Award is given by the Associated Press to the league's most outstanding defensive player at the end of every NFL season since 1971.

Season	Player	Position	Team	Ref.
1971	Alan Page	DT	Minnesota	
1972	Joe Greene	DT	Pittsburgh	
1973	Dick Anderson	S	Miami	
1974	Joe Greene	DT	Pittsburgh	
1975	Mel Blount	CB	Pittsburgh	
1976	Jack Lambert	LB	Pittsburgh	
1977	Harvey Martin	DE	Dallas	
1978	Randy Gradishar	LB	Denver	
1979	Lee Roy Selmon	DE	Tampa Bay	
1980	Lester Hayes	CB	Oakland	
1981	Lawrence Taylor	LB	NY Giants	
1982	Lawrence Taylor	LB	NY Giants	
1983	Doug Betters	DE	Miami	
1984	Kenny Easley	S	Seattle	
1985	Mike Singletary	LB	Chicago	
1986	Lawrence Taylor	LB	NY Giants	
1987	Reggie White	DE	Philadelphia	
1988	Mike Singletary	LB	Chicago	
1989	Keith Millard	DT	Minnesota	
1990	Bruce Smith	DE	Buffalo	
1991	Pat Swilling	LB	New Orleans	
1992	Cortez Kennedy	DT	Seattle	
1993	Rod Woodson	CB	Pittsburgh	
1994	Deion Sanders	CB	San Francisco	
1995	Bryce Paup	LB	Buffalo	
1996	Bruce Smith	DE	Buffalo	
1997	Dana Stubblefield	DT	San Francisco	
1998	Reggie White	DE	Green Bay	
1999	Warren Sapp	DT	Tampa Bay	
2000	Ray Lewis	LB	Baltimore	
2001	Michael Strahan	DE	NY Giants	
2002	Derrick Brooks	LB	Tampa Bay	
2003	Ray Lewis	LB	Baltimore	
2004	Ed Reed	S	Baltimore	
2005	Brian Urlacher	LB	Chicago	
2006	Jason Taylor	DE	Miami	
2007	Bob Sanders	S	Indianapolis	
2008	James Harrison	LB	Pittsburgh	
2009	Charles Woodson	CB	Green Bay	
2010	Troy Polamalu	S	Pittsburgh	
2011	Terrell Suggs	LB	Baltimore	
2012	J. J. Watt	DE	Houston	
2013	Luke Kuechly	LB	Carolina	
2014	J. J. Watt	DE	Houston	
2015	J. J. Watt	DE	Houston	
2016	Khalil Mack	DE	Oakland	
2017	Aaron Donald	DT	LA Rams	
2018	Aaron Donald	DT	LA Rams	
2019	Stephon Gilmore	CB	New England	
2020	Aaron Donald	DT	LA Rams	
2021	T. J. Watt	LB	Pittsburgh	
2022	Nick Bosa	DE	San Francisco	
2023	Myles Garrett	DE	Cleveland	
2024	Patrick Surtain II	CB	Denver	
2025	Myles Garrett	DE	Cleveland	

== Pro Football Writers of America ==
The Professional Football Writers of America (PFWA) is made up of sportswriters who cover the NFL and the 32 teams on a daily basis.

From 1969 to 1991, the Defensive Player of the Year was presented by Pro Football Weekly only. PFW and the Professional Football Writers of America combined their awards in 1992. Since 2013, the award was presented by PFWA alone.

Season	Player	Position	Team
1969	Bobby Bell	OLB	Kansas City
1970	Dick Butkus	MLB	Chicago
1971	Alan Page	DT	Minnesota
1972	Joe Greene	DT	Pittsburgh
1973	Alan Page	DT	Minnesota
1974	Joe Greene	DT	Pittsburgh
1975	Jack Ham	OLB	Pittsburgh
1976	Jack Lambert	MLB	Pittsburgh
1977	Harvey Martin	DE	Dallas
1978	Randy Gradishar	ILB	Denver
1979	Lee Roy Selmon	DE	Tampa Bay
1980	Lester Hayes	CB	Oakland
1981	Joe Klecko	DE	NY Jets
1982	Dan Hampton	DT	Chicago
1983	Bob Baumhower	DT	Miami
1984	Kenny Easley	S	Seattle
1985	not awarded		
1986	Lawrence Taylor	OLB	NY Giants
1987	Reggie White	DE	Philadelphia
1988	Mike Singletary	MLB	Chicago
1989	Keith Millard	DT	Minnesota
1990	Bruce Smith	DE	Buffalo
1991	Reggie White	DE	Philadelphia
1992	Cortez Kennedy	DT	Seattle
1993	Bruce Smith	DE	Buffalo
1994	Deion Sanders	CB	San Francisco
1995	Bryce Paup	OLB	Buffalo
1996	Bruce Smith	DE	Buffalo
1997	Dana Stubblefield	DT	San Francisco
1998	Reggie White	DE	Green Bay
1999	Warren Sapp	DT	Tampa Bay
2000	Ray Lewis	MLB	Baltimore
2001	Michael Strahan	DE	NY Giants
2002	Derrick Brooks	OLB	Tampa Bay
2003	Ray Lewis	MLB	Baltimore
2004	Ed Reed	S	Baltimore
2005	Brian Urlacher	MLB	Chicago
2006	Jason Taylor	DE	Miami
2007	Bob Sanders	S	Indianapolis
2008	James Harrison	OLB	Pittsburgh
2009	Charles Woodson	CB	Green Bay
2010	Clay Matthews III	OLB	Green Bay
2011	Terrell Suggs	OLB	Baltimore
2012	J. J. Watt	DE	Houston
2013	Robert Quinn	DE	St. Louis
2014	J. J. Watt	DE	Houston
2015	J. J. Watt	DE	Houston
2016	Khalil Mack	DE	Oakland
2017	Calais Campbell	DE	Jacksonville
2018	Aaron Donald	DT	LA Rams
2019	Stephon Gilmore	CB	New England
2020	Aaron Donald	DT	LA Rams
2021	T. J. Watt	OLB	Pittsburgh
2022	Nick Bosa	DE	San Francisco
2023	Myles Garrett	DE	Cleveland
2024	Patrick Surtain II	CB	Denver
2025	Myles Garrett	DE	Cleveland

== Newspaper Enterprise Association ==
From 1966 to 1998, the Newspaper Enterprise Association (NEA) annually awarded the George S. Halas Trophy to the NFL's outstanding defensive player. The winner was released via the NEA news service and also appeared in the World Almanac, which was an NEA publication. It was considered one of the major awards and was included in the NFL Record and Fact Book and its winners still appear in the NFL's Official Encyclopedia, Total Football II.

Season	Player	Position	Team
1966	Larry Wilson	S	St. Louis
1967	Deacon Jones	DE	LA Rams
1968	Deacon Jones	DE	LA Rams
1969	Dick Butkus	MLB	Chicago
1970	Dick Butkus	MLB	Chicago
1971	Carl Eller	DE	Minnesota
1972	Joe Greene	DT	Pittsburgh
1973	Alan Page	DT	Minnesota
1974	Joe Greene	DT	Pittsburgh
1975	Curley Culp	DT	Houston
1976	Jerry Sherk	DT	Cleveland
1977	Harvey Martin	DE	Dallas
1978	Randy Gradishar	ILB	Denver
1979	Lee Roy Selmon	DE	Tampa Bay
1980	Lester Hayes	CB	Oakland
1981	Joe Klecko	DE	NY Jets
1982	Mark Gastineau	DE	NY Jets
1983	Jack Lambert	MLB	Pittsburgh
1984	Mike Haynes	CB	LA Raiders
1985	Howie Long; Andre Tippett	DE; OLB	LA Raiders; New England
1986	Lawrence Taylor	OLB	NY Giants
1987	Reggie White	DE	Philadelphia
1988	Mike Singletary	MLB	Chicago
1989	Tim Harris	OLB	Green Bay
1990	Bruce Smith	DE	Buffalo
1991	Pat Swilling	OLB	New Orleans
1992	Junior Seau	LB	San Diego
1993	Bruce Smith	DE	Buffalo
1994	Deion Sanders	CB	San Francisco
1995	Bryce Paup	OLB	Buffalo
1996	Kevin Greene	OLB	Carolina
1997	Dana Stubblefield	DT	San Francisco
1998	Reggie White	DE	Green Bay

== United Press International ==
Season	NFC			AFC		
Season	Player	Position	Team	Player	Position	Team
1975	Jack Youngblood	DE	LA Rams	Mel Blount	CB	Pittsburgh
1976	Wally Chambers	DT	Chicago	Jack Lambert	LB	Pittsburgh
1977	Harvey Martin	DT	Dallas	Lyle Alzado	DE	Denver
1978	Randy White	DT	Dallas	Randy Gradishar	LB	Denver
1979	Lee Roy Selmon	DE	Tampa Bay	Jack Lambert	LB	Pittsburgh
1980	Nolan Cromwell	S	LA Rams	Lester Hayes	CB	Oakland
1981	Fred Dean	DE	San Francisco	Joe Klecko	DE	NY Jets
1982	not awarded					
1983	Lawrence Taylor	LB	NY Giants	Rod Martin	LB	LA Raiders
1984	Mike Singletary	LB	Chicago	Mark Gastineau	DE	NY Jets
1985	Mike Singletary	LB	Chicago	Andre Tippett	LB	New England
1986	Lawrence Taylor	LB	NY Giants	Rulon Jones	DE	Denver
1987	Reggie White	DE	Philadelphia	Bruce Smith	DE	Buffalo
1988	Mike Singletary	LB	Chicago	Bruce Smith; Cornelius Bennett	DE; LB	Buffalo; Buffalo
1989	Keith Millard	DT	Minnesota	Michael Dean Perry	NT	Cleveland
1990	Charles Haley	LB	San Francisco	Bruce Smith	DE	Buffalo
1991	Reggie White	DE	Philadelphia	Cornelius Bennett	LB	Buffalo
1992	Chris Doleman	DE	Minnesota	Junior Seau	LB	San Diego
1993	Eric Allen	CB	Philadelphia	Rod Woodson	CB	Pittsburgh
1994	Charles Haley	DE	Dallas	Greg Lloyd	LB	Pittsburgh
1995	Reggie White	DE	Green Bay	Bryce Paup	LB	Buffalo
1996	Kevin Greene	LB	Carolina	Bruce Smith	DE	Buffalo

== Football Digest ==
Season	Player	Position	Team
1992	Junior Seau	MLB	San Diego
1993	Deion Sanders	CB	Atlanta
1994	Charles Haley	DE	Dallas
1995	Merton Hanks	S	San Francisco
1996	Bruce Smith	DE	Buffalo
1997	Dana Stubblefield	DT	San Francisco
1998	Junior Seau	MLB	San Diego
1999	Warren Sapp	DT	Tampa Bay
2000	Ray Lewis	MLB	Baltimore
2001	Brian Urlacher	MLB	Chicago
2002	Derrick Brooks	OLB	Tampa Bay
2003	Ray Lewis	ILB	Baltimore
2004	Ed Reed	S	Baltimore

== Sporting News ==
Season	Player	Position	Team
2008	Albert Haynesworth	DT	Tennessee
2009	Charles Woodson	CB	Green Bay
2010	Clay Matthews	OLB	Green Bay
2011	Jared Allen	DE	Minnesota
2012	J. J. Watt	DE	Houston
2013	Luke Kuechly	OLB	Carolina
2014	J. J. Watt	DE	Houston
2015	J. J. Watt	DE	Houston
2016	Khalil Mack	DE	Oakland
2017	Calais Campbell	DE	Jacksonville
2018	Aaron Donald	DT	LA Rams
2019	Stephon Gilmore	CB	New England
2020	Aaron Donald	DT	LA Rams
2021	T. J. Watt	OLB	Pittsburgh
2022	Nick Bosa	DE	San Francisco
2023	Myles Garrett	DE	Cleveland
2024	Myles Garrett	DE	Cleveland
2025	Myles Garrett	DE	Cleveland

== Sports Illustrated ==
Sports Illustrated's Defensive Player of the Year Awards spanned from 2008 to 2014

Season	Player	Position	Team
2008	DeMarcus Ware	OLB	Dallas
2009	Darrelle Revis	CB	NY Jets
2010	Julius Peppers	DE	Chicago
2011	Justin Smith	DE	San Francisco
2012	J. J. Watt	DE	Houston
2013	Robert Quinn	DE	St. Louis
2014	J. J. Watt	DE	Houston

== Pro Football Focus ==
Pro Football Focus has given individual awards since 2011.

Season	Player	Position	Team
2011	Justin Smith	DE	San Francisco
2012	J. J. Watt	DE	Houston
2013	J. J. Watt	DE	Houston
2014	J. J. Watt	DE	Houston
2015	Aaron Donald	DT	St. Louis
2016	Aaron Donald	DT	LA Rams
2017	Harrison Smith	S	Minnesota
2018	Aaron Donald	DT	LA Rams
2019	Aaron Donald	DT	LA Rams
2020	Aaron Donald	DT	LA Rams
2021	Aaron Donald	DT	LA Rams
2022	Chris Jones	DT	Kansas City
2023	Myles Garrett	DE	Cleveland
2024	Myles Garrett	DE	Cleveland
2025	Myles Garrett	DE	Cleveland

== 101 Awards ==
Began in 1969, the "101" is 101 of the top NFL sportswriters who have been voting on awards, such as the Defensive Player of each Conference since 1969.

Season	NFC			AFC		
Season	Player	Position	Team	Player	Position	Team
1969	Carl Eller	DE	Minnesota	Bobby Bell	LB	Kansas City
1970	Alan Page	DT	Minnesota	Mike Curtis	LB	Baltimore
1971	Alan Page	DT	Minnesota	Willie Lanier	LB	Kansas City
1972	Chris Hanburger	LB	Washington	Joe Greene	DT	Pittsburgh
1973	Lee Roy Jordan	LB	Dallas	Dick Anderson	S	Miami
1974	Alan Page	DT	Minnesota	Joe Greene	DT	Pittsburgh
1975	Jack Youngblood	DE	LA Rams	Mel Blount	CB	Pittsburgh
1976	Jack Youngblood	DE	LA Rams	Jack Lambert	LB	Pittsburgh
1977	Harvey Martin	DE	Dallas	Lyle Alzado	DE	Denver
1978	Randy White	DT	Dallas	Randy Gradishar	LB	Denver
1979	Lee Roy Selmon	DE	Tampa Bay	Mike Reinfeldt	S	Houston
1980	Nolan Cromwell	DB	LA Rams	Lester Hayes	CB	Oakland
1981	Fred Dean	DE	San Francisco	Joe Klecko	DE	NY Jets
1982	Not awarded due to players strike					
1983	Dave Butz	DT	Washington	Doug Betters	DE	Miami
1984	Lawrence Taylor	LB	NY Giants	Kenny Easley	S	Seattle
1985	Mike Singletary	LB	Chicago	Andre Tippett	OLB	New England
1986	Lawrence Taylor	LB	NY Giants	Deron Cherry	S	Kansas City
1987	Reggie White	DE	Philadelphia	Bruce Smith	DE	Buffalo
1988	Mike Singletary	LB	Chicago	Cornelius Bennett	LB	Buffalo
1989	Keith Millard	DT	Minnesota	Michael Dean Perry	NT	Cleveland
1990	Charles Haley	LB	San Francisco	Bruce Smith	DE	Buffalo
1991	Pat Swilling	LB	New Orleans	Derrick Thomas	LB	Kansas City
1992	Wilber Marshall	LB	Washington	Cortez Kennedy	DT	Seattle
1993	Deion Sanders	CB	Atlanta	Rod Woodson	CB	Pittsburgh
1994	Deion Sanders	CB	San Francisco	Greg Lloyd	LB	Pittsburgh
1995	Reggie White	DE	Green Bay	Bryce Paup	LB	Buffalo
1996	Kevin Greene	OLB	Carolina	Bruce Smith	DE	Buffalo
1997	Dana Stubblefield	DT	San Francisco	Carnell Lake	DB	Pittsburgh
1998	Reggie White	DE	Green Bay	Junior Seau	LB	San Diego
1999	Warren Sapp	DT	Tampa Bay	Jevon Kearse	DE	Tennessee
2000	La'Roi Glover	DT	New Orleans	Ray Lewis	LB	Baltimore
2001	Michael Strahan	DE	NY Giants	Ray Lewis	LB	Baltimore
2002	Derrick Brooks	LB	Tampa Bay	Jason Taylor	DE	Miami
2003	Michael Strahan	DE	NY Giants	Ray Lewis	LB	Baltimore
2004	Julius Peppers	DE	Carolina	Ed Reed	S	Baltimore
2005	Brian Urlacher	LB	Chicago	Dwight Freeney	DE	Indianapolis
2006	Brian Urlacher	LB	Chicago	Jason Taylor	DE	Miami
2007	Patrick Kerney	DE	Seattle	Bob Sanders	S	Indianapolis
2008	DeMarcus Ware	OLB	Dallas	James Harrison	LB	Pittsburgh
2009	Charles Woodson	CB	Green Bay	Darrelle Revis	CB	NY Jets
2010	Clay Matthews III	OLB	Green Bay	Troy Polamalu	S	Pittsburgh
2011	Jared Allen	DE	Minnesota	Terrell Suggs	LB	Baltimore
2012	Aldon Smith	DE	San Francisco	J. J. Watt	DE	Houston
2013	Luke Kuechly	LB	Carolina	Robert Mathis	LB	Indianapolis
2014	Richard Sherman	CB	Seattle	J. J. Watt	DE	Houston
2015	Aaron Donald	DT	St. Louis	J. J. Watt	DE	Houston
2016	Landon Collins	S	NY Giants	Khalil Mack	DE	Oakland
2017	Aaron Donald	DT	LA Rams	Calais Campbell	DE	Jacksonville
2018	Aaron Donald	DT	LA Rams	J. J. Watt	DE	Houston
2019	Chandler Jones	DE	Arizona	Stephon Gilmore	CB	New England
2020	Aaron Donald	DT	LA Rams	T. J. Watt	LB	Pittsburgh
2021	Micah Parsons	DE	Dallas	T. J. Watt	LB	Pittsburgh
2022	Nick Bosa	DE	San Francisco	Chris Jones	DT	Kansas City
2023	Micah Parsons	DE	Dallas	T. J. Watt	LB	Pittsburgh
2024	Kerby Joseph	S	Detroit	Patrick Surtain II	CB	Denver
2025	Micah Parsons	DE	Green Bay	Myles Garrett	DE	Cleveland

== See also ==
- List of NFL awards
