= Ken Irvin =

American football player (born 1972)

No. 27, 22
- Position: Cornerback

Personal information
- Born: July 11, 1972 (age 54); Rome, Georgia, U.S.
- Listed height: 5 ft 11 in (1.80 m)
- Listed weight: 182 lb (83 kg)

Career information
- High school: Pepperell (Lindale, Georgia)
- College: Memphis
- NFL draft: 1995: 4th round, 109th overall pick

Career history
- Buffalo Bills (1995–2001); New Orleans Saints (2002); Minnesota Vikings (2003–2005)

Career NFL statistics
- Tackles: 340
- Sacks: 2
- Forced fumbles: 3
- Fumble recoveries: 2
- Interceptions: 10
- Stats at Pro Football Reference

Kenneth Pernell Irvin (born July 11, 1972) is an American former professional football player who was a cornerback for 11 seasons in the National Football League (NFL) for the Buffalo Bills, New Orleans Saints, and Minnesota Vikings. He was selected by the Bills in the fourth round of the 1995 NFL draft. He played college football for the Memphis Tigers, which is where he became affiliated with Phi Beta Sigma fraternity.

== NFL career statistics ==
Legend
**Bold**	Career high

=== Regular season ===
Year	Team	Games		Tackles				Interceptions				Fumbles			
Year	Team	GP	GS	Comb	Solo	Ast	Sck	Int	Yds	TD	Lng	FF	FR	Yds	TD
1995	BUF	16	3	20	18	2	0.0	0	0	0	0	0	0	0	0
1996	BUF	16	1	21	17	4	**2.0**	0	0	0	0	0	**1**	0	0
1997	BUF	16	0	5	5	0	0.0	**2**	28	0	28	0	0	0	0
1998	BUF	16	16	51	46	5	0.0	1	**43**	0	**43**	**2**	0	0	0
1999	BUF	14	14	43	38	5	0.0	1	1	0	1	0	0	0	0
2000	BUF	16	16	32	30	2	0.0	**2**	1	0	1	0	0	0	0
2001	BUF	14	4	36	33	3	0.0	1	0	0	0	0	0	0	0
2002	NO	16	9	**65**	**61**	4	0.0	**2**	10	0	10	0	**1**	0	0
2003	MIN	16	8	57	46	**11**	0.0	1	1	0	1	1	0	0	0
2005	MIN	7	1	10	9	1	0.0	0	0	0	0	0	0	0	0
Career		147	72	340	303	37	2.0	10	84	0	43	3	2	0	0

=== Playoffs ===
Year	Team	Games		Tackles				Interceptions				Fumbles			
Year	Team	GP	GS	Comb	Solo	Ast	Sck	Int	Yds	TD	Lng	FF	FR	Yds	TD
1995	BUF	2	0	**2**	**2**	0	0.0	**1**	0	0	0	0	0	0	0
1996	BUF	1	0	**2**	**2**	0	0.0	0	0	0	0	0	0	0	0
1998	BUF	1	1	**2**	**2**	0	0.0	0	0	0	0	0	0	0	0
Career		4	1	6	6	0	0.0	1	0	0	0	0	0	0	0
