= Steve Christie =

Canadian gridiron football player (born 1967)

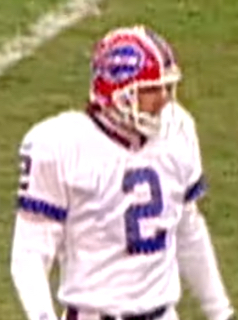
- Christie with the Buffalo Bills in 2000

No. 2, 8, 19
- Position: Placekicker

Personal information
- Born: November 13, 1967 (age 59); Hamilton, Ontario, Canada
- Listed height: 6 ft 0 in (1.83 m)
- Listed weight: 195 lb (88 kg)

Career information
- High school: Oakville Trafalgar (Oakville, Ontario)
- College: William & Mary
- CFL draft: 1990: 1st round, 6th overall pick

Career history
- Tampa Bay Buccaneers (1990–1991); Buffalo Bills (1992–2001); San Diego Chargers (2001–2003); Jacksonville Jaguars (2004)*; New York Giants (2004); Toronto Argonauts (2007)
- * Offseason or practice squad member only

Awards and highlights
- First-team All-Pro (1990); PFWA All-Rookie Team (1990); Buffalo Bills 50th Anniversary Team; Buffalo Sports Hall of Fame; William & Mary Athletics Hall of Fame

Career statistics
- Field goals: 336 / 431 (.780)
- Extra points: 468 / 473 (.989)
- Points scored: 1,476
- Stats at Pro Football Reference

Geoffrey Stephen Christie (born November 13, 1967) is a Canadian former professional football placekicker in the National Football League (NFL), who, as a member of the Buffalo Bills, became known for his ability to kick clutch field goals, even in poor weather.

== Early life and college ==
Christie grew up in Oakville, Ontario, and graduated from The College of William and Mary.

== Professional career ==
=== Tampa Bay Buccaneers ===
Christie made his NFL debut with the Tampa Bay Buccaneers in 1990. He made all 27 extra-point attempts and 23 of 27 field goal tries in his rookie season. He would end up playing two years for the Buccaneers.

=== Buffalo Bills ===
From 1992 to 2000, Christie kicked for Buffalo. With the Bills, he would become one of the game's top kickers. He was a key contributor in the Bills comeback win against the Houston Oilers, in which Buffalo rallied from a 32-point deficit to complete the largest postseason comeback victory in NFL history. Christie kicked a successful onside kick, which he recovered himself (becoming the first placekicker ever to do so in an NFL playoff game), and also kicked the game-winning 32-yard field goal in overtime. His kicking shoe from that game is displayed in the Pro Football Hall of Fame in Canton. He then went on to kick five field goals in the Bills 29–10 win over the Miami Dolphins in the AFC championship game, helping Buffalo get to their third consecutive Super Bowl.

In 1993, Christie set a Bills record by kicking a 59-yard field goal in a regular-season game. It was just four yards short of the all-time NFL record. The record was broken by Tyler Bass with a 61-yard field goal in 2024. In Super Bowl XXVIII, Christie set the record for the longest field goal in Super Bowl history at 54 yards until it was eventually broken by Harrison Butker in Super Bowl LVIII.

In the 2000 season, Christie was an instrumental part of the Bills' eight victories. In week 1 vs. the Tennessee Titans, Christie went 3 for 4 on field-goal attempts (41, 42, & 33 yards). The 33-yard field goal came with just :35 to play, giving the Bills a win over the Titans, who had knocked them out of the playoffs the year before. In week 7 vs. the San Diego Chargers, Christie kicked a 29-yard field goal with just :11 seconds to play, forcing the game into overtime. Christie then nailed a 46-yard field goal in overtime, giving the Bills their third victory of the season. In week 9 vs. the New York Jets, Christie went 3 for 4 on field-goal attempts (20, 29, & 34 yards). The 34-yard field goal came with just :03 seconds to play, lifting the Bills to 4–4 on the season. In week 10 vs. the New England Patriots, Christie kicked a 48-yard field goal in rainy conditions with just seconds to play, forcing the game into overtime. Christie then nailed a 32-yard field goal in overtime, sending the Bills to 5–4 on the season.

Before the 2001 regular season, Christie was placed on IR from an offseason groin injury having accuracy problems during the preseason being replaced by Jake Arians prior to the start of the season. Christie eventually got cut on October 4.

Christie has nine field goals in overtime to his credit, an NFL record he shares with Jason Elam and Jim Breech.

=== San Diego Chargers ===
From 2001 to 2003 he played for the San Diego Chargers, who, with the hire of former Bills GM John Butler, acquired several former Buffalo players.

In 2001, Butler signed Christie on November 28, to replace Wade Richey who was demoted to kickoffs after struggling on field goals.

=== Jacksonville Jaguars ===
In 2004, Christie was signed by the Jacksonville Jaguars to put some pressure on struggling rookie Josh Scobee.

=== New York Giants ===
Christie requested his release from Jacksonville after a week in camp hoping to retire, but signed with the New York Giants a day later, playing what would be his final NFL season.

In his 15 NFL seasons, Christie converted 336 of 431 (77%) field goals and 468 of 473 (98%) extra points, giving him a total of 1,476 points.

=== Toronto Argonauts ===
On July 2, 2007, Christie joined the Toronto Argonauts of the Canadian Football League by signing a practice roster agreement with the team. On the signing, Christie pointed out that one reason for joining the team was "basically doing Michael (Clemons) a favour" as a former college teammate and that it was tentatively for one game. The other reason was that as a Canadian citizen, playing one game in the CFL, would be great way to finish his career. Christie was activated to play on July 7, 2007, against the Hamilton Tiger-Cats.

On March 5, 2008, Christie retired from professional football. The Buffalo Bills officially signed Christie to a one-day contract, thus to retire as a Buffalo Bill. He currently resides in Bradenton, Florida, with his wife Kelly and their daughter Clare.

== Career regular season statistics ==
Career high/best bolded

Regular season statistics
Season	Team (record)	G	FGM	FGA	%	<20	20-29	30-39	40-49	50+	LNG	BLK	XPM	XPA	%	PTS
1990	TB (6–10)	**16**	23	27	85.2	0–0	7–7	10–13	4–5	2–2	54	0	27	27	**100.0**	96
1991	TB (3–13)	**16**	15	20	75.0	1–1	4–4	7–11	3–4	0–0	49	1	22	22	**100.0**	67
1992	BUF (11–5)	**16**	24	30	80.0	**2–2**	9–9	3–6	7–8	3–5	54	2	**43**	**44**	97.7	115
1993	BUF (12–4)	**16**	23	32	71.9	0–0	4–5	12–12	6–9	1–6	**59**	0	36	37	97.3	105
1994	BUF (7–9)	**16**	24	28	**85.7**	0–0	11–12	6–7	5–7	2–2	52	1	38	38	**100.0**	110
1995	BUF (10–6)	**16**	31	40	77.5	0–0	**13–14**	**13–15**	3–6	2–5	51	1	33	35	94.3	126
1996	BUF (10–6)	**16**	24	29	82.8	0–0	5–6	12–14	7–8	0–1	48	0	33	33	**100.0**	105
1997	BUF (6–10)	**16**	24	30	80.0	0–0	6–6	9–12	8–10	1–2	55	1	21	21	**100.0**	93
1998	BUF (10–6)	**16**	**33**	**41**	80.5	1–1	10–12	12–14	**9–11**	1–3	52	0	41	41	**100.0**	**140**
1999	BUF (11–5)	**16**	25	34	73.5	**2–2**	10–10	7–10	3–9	**3–3**	52	0	33	33	**100.0**	108
2000	BUF (8–8)	**16**	26	35	74.3	**2–2**	11–13	4–6	9–13	0–1	48	**4**	31	31	**100.0**	109
2001	SD (5–11)	5	9	11	81.8	0–0	4–4	3–5	2–2	0–0	41	0	6	6	**100.0**	33
2002	SD (8–8)	**16**	18	26	69.2	0–0	8–8	5–6	4–9	1–3	53	**4**	35	36	97.2	89
2003	SD (4–12)	**16**	15	20	75.0	1–1	6–6	3–3	3–7	2–3	51	2	36	36	**100.0**	81
2004	NYG (6–10)	**16**	22	28	78.6	1–1	8–8	6–8	4–7	3–4	53	2	33	33	**100.0**	99
Career (15 seasons)		229	336	431	78.0	10–10	116–124	112–142	77–115	21–40	59	18	468	473	98.9	1476

== After football ==
Christie also served as an analyst for The Score Television Network. He also did color commentary for the University at Buffalo Bulls football team on WECK radio.

Steve studied fine Arts at the College of William & Mary and continues to show his Artwork and is commissioned for private pieces. Steve also enjoys live music and helps supports the Annual Borderland Music Festival at Knox Farms in East Aurora NY. He has supported many charities like Camp Good Days and Special Times in WNY Region and Team in Training for Leukemia & Lymphoma.

Christie is currently President of Relative Goal Sports and Entertainment Management LLC., In 2015 Christie was named executive director of Sports at Mastermind Lounge, LLC. He is also a Sales Associate with LPT Realty LLC, Florida, working with his wife, Realtor Kelly Christie as "Team Christie". He also performs in a series of Buffalo-area commercials for Lake Effect Furniture.

Steve also is hired for public appearances and speaking engagements.

In 2014, Christie was diagnosed with colorectal cancer. After chemotherapy and radiation treatments in Buffalo, he underwent two successful surgeries at the Cleveland Clinic in Cleveland, Ohio.
