= Marlo Perry =

American football player (born 1972)

No. 58
- Position: Linebacker

Personal information
- Born: August 25, 1972 (age 54); Forest, Mississippi, U.S.
- Listed height: 6 ft 4 in (1.93 m)
- Listed weight: 250 lb (113 kg)

Career information
- High school: Scott Central (Forest)
- College: Jackson State
- NFL draft: 1994: 3rd round, 81st overall pick

Career history
- Buffalo Bills (1994–1999)

Career NFL statistics
- Tackles: 184
- Sacks: 1.5
- Interceptions: 2
- Stats at Pro Football Reference

Marlo Perry (born August 25, 1972) is an American former professional football player who was a linebacker in the National Football League (NFL). He was selected in the third round of the 1994 NFL draft. He played his entire six-year career from 1994 to 1999 for the Buffalo Bills. His career was ended by a low block to his knee. He played High School football at Scott Central High School in Forest, Mississippi under Head Coach Bill Scott. He was named SWAC freshman of the year while playing college ball at Jackson State University.

== NFL career statistics ==
Legend
**Bold**	Career high

Year	Team	Games		Tackles				Interceptions				Fumbles			
Year	Team	GP	GS	Comb	Solo	Ast	Sck	Int	Yds	TD	Lng	FF	FR	Yds	TD
1994	BUF	2	0	1	1	0	0.0	0	0	0	0	0	0	0	0
1995	BUF	16	11	**59**	**44**	**15**	0.0	0	0	0	0	0	0	0	0
1996	BUF	13	0	21	15	6	0.0	**1**	**6**	0	**6**	0	0	0	0
1997	BUF	13	0	12	9	3	0.0	**1**	4	0	4	0	**1**	0	0
1998	BUF	16	1	49	35	14	0.0	0	0	0	0	**1**	0	0	0
1999	BUF	16	0	42	32	10	**1.5**	0	0	0	0	0	0	0	0
Career		76	12	184	136	48	1.5	2	10	0	6	1	1	0	0
