= Andre Reed =

American football player (born 1964)

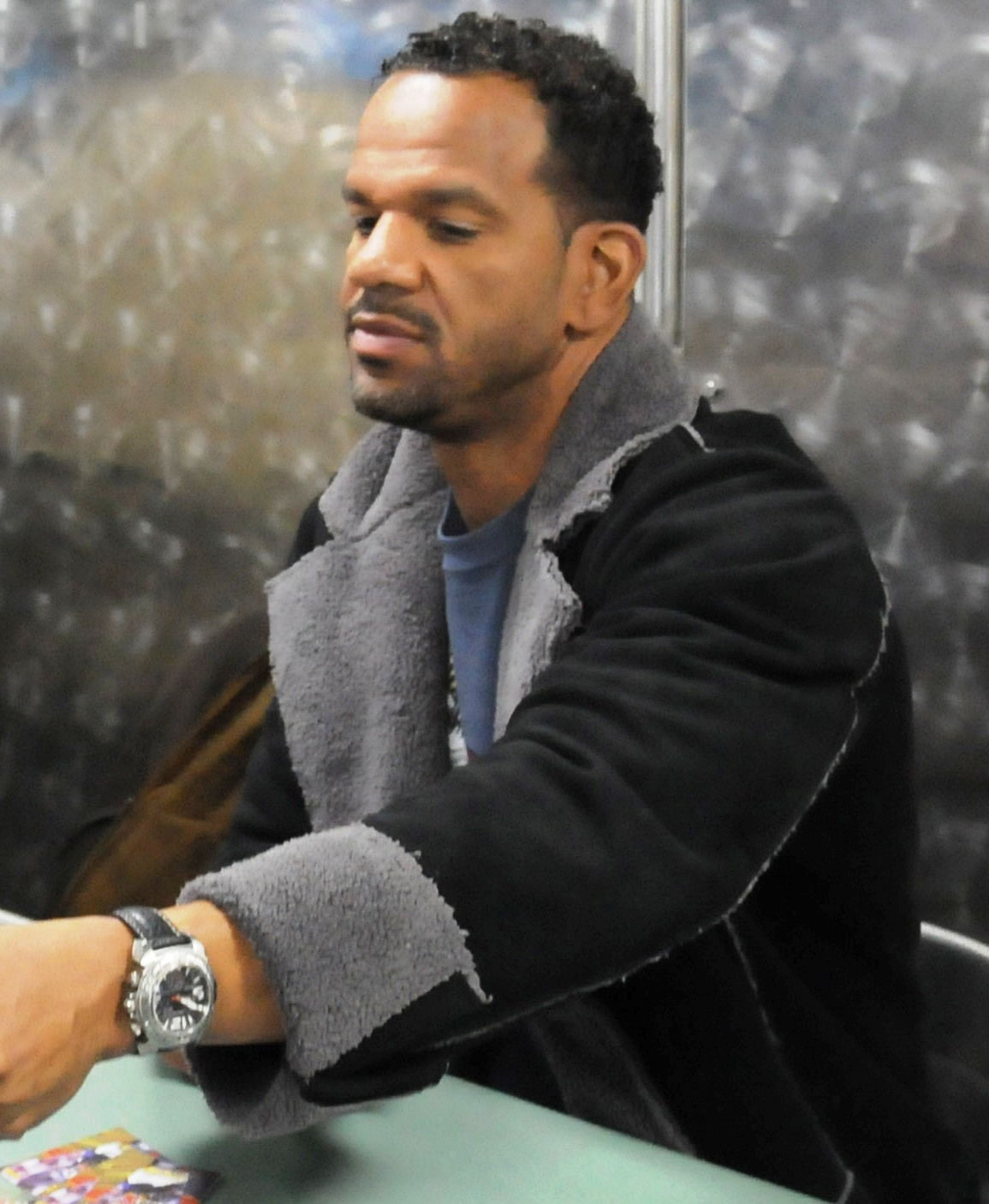
- Reed in 2009

No. 83, 84
- Position: Wide receiver

Personal information
- Born: January 29, 1964 (age 62); Allentown, Pennsylvania, U.S.
- Listed height: 6 ft 2 in (1.88 m)
- Listed weight: 190 lb (86 kg)

Career information
- High school: Dieruff (Allentown)
- College: Kutztown (1982–1984)
- NFL draft: 1985: 4th round, 86th overall pick

Career history
- Buffalo Bills (1985–1999); Denver Broncos (2000)*; Washington Redskins (2000)
- * Offseason or practice squad member only

Awards and highlights
- 2× Second-team All-Pro (1989, 1990); 7× Pro Bowl (1988–1994); Buffalo Bills Wall of Fame; Buffalo Bills 50th Anniversary Team

Career NFL statistics
- Receptions: 951
- Receiving yards: 13,258
- Receiving touchdowns: 87
- Stats at Pro Football Reference
- Pro Football Hall of Fame

Andre Darnell Reed (born January 29, 1964) is an American former professional football player who was a wide receiver for 16 seasons in the National Football League (NFL), primarily with the Buffalo Bills. He played college football for the Kutztown Golden Bears and was selected by the Bills in the fourth round of the 1985 NFL draft with the 86th overall selection. Following 15 seasons with the Bills, with whom he earned seven Pro Bowl selections, Reed spent his final season as a member of the Washington Redskins in 2000.

Reed ranks 18th in all-time NFL touchdown receptions with 87 and tenth in all-time NFL post-season receptions with 85. Reed helped lead the Bills to four consecutive, although winless, Super Bowls, Super Bowl XXV to Super Bowl XXVIII. At the time of his 2001 retirement, Reed was second in all-time NFL career receptions. He was inducted into the Pro Football Hall of Fame in 2014.

== Early life ==
Reed was born in Allentown, Pennsylvania, on January 29, 1964. He began his football career at Allentown's Dieruff High School, where he played quarterback and competed in the Eastern Pennsylvania Conference. In his senior year in 1981, Reed helped lead Dieruff to an EPC tri-championship, tying for the championship with Emmaus High School and Whitehall High School.

== College career ==
Reed then attended Kutztown University, where he moved to the wide receiver position and drew the attention of the NFL for his speed and durability at the receiver position. He set nine school records and finished his college career with 142 receptions for 2,020 yards and 14 touchdowns.

== Professional career ==
=== Buffalo Bills ===
In the 1985 NFL draft, Reed was selected by the Buffalo Bills in the fourth round with the 86th overall selection, making him just the second player ever from Kutztown to be selected in an NFL Draft; the first was Don Shaver in 1981. Reed played for the Bills for 15 consecutive seasons, from 1985 through 1999, during which he helped lead the Bills to four consecutive Super Bowls. He was released in the 2000 offseason along with fellow longtime Bills' players Thurman Thomas and Bruce Smith after the team found itself in severe salary cap trouble; the roster dump began a period of downfall for the Buffalo Bills, who did not again reach the playoffs until the 2017 season.

==== "The Comeback" ====
In addition to the role he played in taking the Bills to four consecutive Super Bowls, Reed is also remembered for his contributions to the Bills' January 3, 1993, playoff victory over the Houston Oilers, a game that has come to be known as "The Comeback." In the game, which Houston led 35–3 during the third quarter, Reed caught three touchdowns in the second half, leading Buffalo's rally from a 32-point deficit in what became the largest postseason comeback in NFL history. Reed finished the game with eight receptions for 136 yards and three touchdowns. The game is recognized as one of the largest comebacks by any team in the history of all of the American professional sports. Following the Bills' victory over Houston, Reed went on to catch eight passes for 152 yards in the Bills' 52–17 Super Bowl XXVII loss, on January 31, 1993, to the Dallas Cowboys.

=== Denver Broncos and Washington Redskins ===
In 2000, Reed signed a two-year contract with the Denver Broncos in June but was buried on the depth chart behind Rod Smith, Ed McCaffrey, Robert Brooks, and Travis McGriff. Reed eventually asked for his release from the Broncos after then Broncos Head Coach Mike Shanahan informed Reed that he would be inactive for their 2000 season opener and wanted to make a more immediate contribution. He eventually joined the Washington Redskins and retired after the 2000 season.

== NFL records ==
Reed ranks 15th in all-time NFL history in touchdown receptions with 87 and ninth in NFL history in all-time post-season receptions with 85 as of 2022. He exceeded 1,000 receiving yards four times in a 16-year career and rushed for 500 yards and a touchdown on 75 carries. With the Bills, Reed played in four consecutive Super Bowls (1991–1994) and was selected to the Pro Bowl in seven consecutive seasons (1988–1994). He set season career highs with 90 receptions in 1994, ten touchdowns in 1991, and 1,312 receiving yards in 1989. Reed played in 234 NFL games between 1985 and 2000, the 99th-most games played by any player in NFL history, including players in less physically demanding positions, such as kickers and punters.

=== Super Bowl records ===
In his four Super Bowls, Reed recorded 27 receptions, the third-most total career Super Bowl receptions in NFL history behind Jerry Rice's 33 and Travis Kelce's 35, and 323 total Super Bowl receiving yards, sixth-most in Super Bowl history.

== NFL career statistics ==
=== Regular season ===
Year	Team	Games		Receiving						Rushing					Fumbles	
Year	Team	GP	GS	Rec	Yds	Avg	Lng	TD	FD	Att	Yds	Avg	Lng	TD	Fum	Lost
1985	BUF	16	15	48	637	13.3	32	4	31	3	-1	-0.3	14	1	0	0
1986	BUF	15	15	53	739	13.9	55	7	38	3	-8	-2.7	4	0	0	0
1987	BUF	12	12	57	752	13.2	40	5	38	1	1	1	1	0	0	0
1988	BUF	15	14	71	968	13.6	65	6	40	6	64	10.7	36	0	0	0
1989	BUF	16	16	88	1,312	13.7	78	9	61	2	31	15.5	23	0	0	0
1990	BUF	16	16	71	945	13.3	56	8	47	3	23	7.7	26	0	0	0
1991	BUF	16	16	81	1,113	13.7	55	10	62	12	136	11.3	46	0	0	0
1992	BUF	16	16	65	913	14.0	51	3	41	8	65	8.1	24	0	4	4
1993	BUF	15	15	52	854	16.4	65	6	32	9	21	2.3	15	0	3	1
1994	BUF	16	16	90	1,303	14.5	83	8	64	10	87	8.7	20	0	2	2
1995	BUF	6	6	24	312	13.0	41	3	10	7	48	6.9	14	0	2	2
1996	BUF	16	16	66	1,036	15.7	78	6	42	8	22	2.8	13	0	1	0
1997	BUF	15	15	60	880	14.7	77	5	39	3	11	3.7	9	0	0	0
1998	BUF	15	13	63	795	12.6	67	5	49	0	0	—	0	0	0	0
1999	BUF	16	16	52	536	10.3	30	1	31	0	0	—	0	0	0	0
2000	WAS	13	0	10	103	10.3	21	1	8	0	0	—	0	0	0	0
Total		234	217	951	13,198	13.9	83	87	633	75	500	6.7	46	1	12	9

=== Postseason ===
Year	Team	Games		Receiving						Rushing					Fumbles	
Year	Team	GP	GS	Rec	Yds	Avg	Lng	TD	FD	Att	Yds	Avg	Lng	TD	Fum	Lost
1988	BUF	2	2	11	146	13.3	53	1	8	1	-1	-1.0	-1	0	0	0
1989	BUF	1	1	6	115	19.2	72	1	3	0	0	—	0	0	0	0
1990	BUF	3	3	14	213	15.2	43	2	8	0	0	—	0	0	0	0
1991	BUF	3	3	11	153	13.9	53	2	7	2	22	11.0	16	0	1	0
1992	BUF	4	4	19	313	16.5	40	3	13	3	-2	-0.7	4	0	0	0
1993	BUF	3	3	14	177	12.6	28	0	8	1	8	8.0	8	0	0	0
1995	BUF	2	2	2	20	10.0	15	0	1	0	—	0	0	0	0	0
1996	BUF	1	1	3	32	10.7	16	0	2	0	—	0	0	0	0	0
1998	BUF	1	1	5	60	12.0	17	0	2	0	—	0	0	0	1	1
1999	BUF	1	1	0	0	—	0	0	0	0	—	0	0	0	0	0
Total		21	21	85	1,229	14.5	72	9	52	7	27	3.9	16	0	2	1

== Buffalo Bills Wall of Fame ==
In 2006, Reed was voted into the Buffalo Bills Wall of Fame, joining a number of other players from Bills history whose names are enshrined in cement inside Highmark Stadium. Reed's was inducted in 2009 along with former teammate Bruce Smith and team owner Ralph Wilson. Through the night, Reed was referred to multiple times as "future Hall of Famer" with various speeches voicing their endorsement for Reed as a candidate.

== Pro Football Hall of Fame ==
Reed became eligible for induction into the NFL's Pro Football Hall of Fame in 2006. He was not selected for induction in any of his first seven years of eligibility, however, due partly to a logjam of accomplished wide receiver candidates, including Art Monk, Michael Irvin, and Cris Carter. Although Irvin, Monk and Carter are now enshrined as of 2007, 2008 and 2013 respectively, the logjam became worse for Reed when he was again overlooked in 2009 and 2010, which saw wide receiver candidates Jerry Rice and Tim Brown both eligible for the first time. Rice was inducted, which cleared some of the logjam going forward for Reed. Reed remained a Hall of Fame candidate in 2011, 2012, and 2013 but was passed over each of those years. On February 1, 2014, Reed was selected to the Pro Football Hall of Fame, and he was inducted on August 2, 2014.

== Television career ==
Since his NFL retirement in 2000, Reed has provided football commentary on the ESPN2 show, First Take, and appears periodically as a football analyst on NFL on Fox. He has also appeared on the Spike TV sports series Pros vs. Joes in the show's second season. He is also known for Hawaii Five-0 where he appeared in "Ka'aelike" (Season 7, Episode 12). He played a federal prosecutor on MacGyver. He also appeared on Magnum PI Season 2 Episode 17 as himself and as a car salesman who abuses his uncanny resemblance to Andre Reed.

== Personal life and legacy ==
On October 18, 2014, Kutztown University of Pennsylvania, Reed's alma mater, renamed University Field to Andre Reed Stadium in his honor in a ceremony. Reed is mentioned in the 1996 film Jerry Maguire as one of several NFL wide receivers with lucrative contracts, as Rod Tidwell, a fictional wide receiver for the Arizona Cardinals, played by Cuba Gooding, Jr., tells his agent, played by Tom Cruise, that his contract warrants high pay.

In 2025, Reed was named commissioner of the Entertainment Football Association, an arena football league with teams along the Eastern Seaboard.
