= Bryce Paup =

American football player and coach (born 1968)

Iowa State Cyclones
- Title: Assistant defensive line coach

Personal information
- Born: February 29, 1968 (age 58); Jefferson, Iowa, U.S.
- Listed height: 6 ft 5 in (1.96 m)
- Listed weight: 250 lb (113 kg)

Career information
- High school: Scranton (Scranton, Iowa)
- College: Northern Iowa (1986–1989)
- NFL draft: 1990: 6th round, 159th overall pick

Career history

Playing
- Green Bay Packers (1990–1994); Buffalo Bills (1995–1997); Jacksonville Jaguars (1998–1999); Minnesota Vikings (2000)

Coaching
- De Pere HS (WI) (2004–2006) Linebackers coach; Green Bay Southwest HS (WI) (2007–2012) Head coach; Northern Iowa (2013–2016) Defensive line coach; Minnesota (2017) Defensive line coach; Northern Iowa (2018–2021) Defensive line coach; Northern Iowa (2022–2024) Assistant head coach & defensive line coach; Iowa State (2025–present) Assistant defensive line coach

Awards and highlights
- NFL Defensive Player of the Year (1995); First-team All-Pro (1995); 4× Pro Bowl (1994–1997); NFL sacks leader (1995)

Career NFL statistics
- Tackles: 545
- Sacks: 75
- Forced fumbles: 15
- Fumble recoveries: 6
- Interceptions: 6
- Stats at Pro Football Reference

Bryce Eric Paup (born February 29, 1968) is an American former professional football player who was a linebacker for eleven seasons in the National Football League (NFL) with the Green Bay Packers, Buffalo Bills, Jacksonville Jaguars, and Minnesota Vikings.

== Early life ==
Paup grew up on a farm in Scranton, Iowa, where he played football at Scranton High School, a small school that saw Paup as one of just 19 senior graduates in 1986.

He played collegiately at the University of Northern Iowa, and was selected by the Packers in the sixth round of the 1990 NFL draft.

== Professional career ==
Paup played five games in his rookie 1990 season, recording no sacks. In the first game of the 1991 season, Paup was involved in a tackle below the waist on quarterback Randall Cunningham of Philadelphia Eagles that saw contact on the knee for what was soon diagnosed as a torn ACL for the quarterback that sidelined him the rest of the season (Cunningham was quoted as curious about why his knee was hit like that when Paup was already down around the waist but did not wish to put a burden on him). Paup recorded a career-high 4.5 sacks in his second year on September 15 against Tampa Bay, which also included him recording a safety in the 15–13 victory. Paup was utilized in four defensive positions during his Green Bay years, which would see him record 11 sacks in 1993 but somehow was not a Pro Bowl selection. It was 1994 when he managed to earn a Pro Bowl selection when he recorded three interceptions and 7.5 sacks. Despite being named to the Pro Bowl that year, he was not offered a contract by the Packers (who were paying him less than $600,000 that year) after the season ended, as they initially cited the salary cap as a reason before team GM Ron Wolf admitted his error in letting Paup go loose. His aggressive physical style led Packers fans to refer to his tackle as “Paup Smear”, with Paup recording 32.5 sacks in his time with Green Bay.

On March 8, 1995, the Bills signed Paup to a three-year contract worth $7.6 million with a $3.3 million signing bonus that would pair him with Bruce Smith in a 3-4 defense that had Paup assigned to "line up over the tight end and rush the quarterback all game." In 1995, his first season with the Buffalo Bills, Paup was named NFL Defensive Player of the Year by the Associated Press. Paup led the NFL with 17.5 sacks, the fourth-highest single-season total of the 1990s. Paup has been considered one of the top 50 players in Bills history. NFL Total Access listed him as one of the Top 10 free agents of all time.

On February 15, 1998, Paup signed a five-year contract worth $22 million with the Jacksonville Jaguars, making him the second highest-paid linebacker in the league next to Junior Seau. Troubles with being asked to drop into coverage and a decline in sacks (having just 7.5 in 31 games) led to his unhappiness in Jacksonville; he was released after the 1999 season ended. Paup signed a one-year contract just above the league minimum on February 6, 2000. He made no starts in ten games played that year while recording two sacks.

In his career, Paup was a four-time Pro Bowl selection.

== NFL career statistics ==
Legend
	NFL Defensive Player of the Year
	Led the league
**Bold**	Career high

=== Regular season ===
Year	Team	Games		Tackles				Interceptions			Fumbles	
Year	Team	GP	GS	Cmb	Solo	Ast	Sck	Int	Yds	TD	FF	FR
1990	GB	5	0	1	–	–	0.0	0	0	0	0	0
1991	GB	12	1	28	–	–	7.5	0	0	0	**3**	0
1992	GB	16	10	43	–	–	6.5	0	0	0	1	**2**
1993	GB	15	14	74	–	–	11.0	1	8	0	2	0
1994	GB	16	16	79	47	**32**	7.5	**3**	**47**	**1**	2	**2**
1995	BUF	16	16	**89**	**70**	19	**17.5**	2	0	0	**3**	1
1996	BUF	12	11	48	38	10	6.0	0	0	0	2	0
1997	BUF	16	16	78	58	20	9.5	0	0	0	2	1
1998	JAX	16	16	68	55	13	6.5	0	0	0	0	0
1999	JAX	15	14	30	24	6	1.0	0	0	0	0	0
2000	MIN	10	0	7	6	1	2.0	0	0	0	0	0
Career		148	113	545	298	101	75.0	6	55	1	15	6

== Coaching career ==
On March 19, 2007, Paup was introduced as the head football coach at Green Bay Southwest High School. He compiled a 22–14 regular season record in his first four seasons, and in 2009 secured the second playoff victory in school history. Prior to accepting the job, he was an assistant volunteer football coach for the De Pere High School Redbirds of De Pere, Wisconsin for three years, working primarily with the linemen and linebackers.

On March 5, 2013, Paup resigned from Green Bay Southwest and began his first season as the defensive line coach at the University of Northern Iowa.

January 14, 2017, Paup was named University of Minnesota's defensive line coach. After one season with the Gophers, Paup left the Minnesota coaching staff, reportedly to pursue a coaching opportunity in the NFL.

In August 2018, he returned to the University of Northern Iowa defensive line coach.

== Personal life ==
Paup lives in Cedar Falls, IA, with his wife Denise. They have six children: Alex, Nathan, Rachel, Hailey, and twins Paige and Lauren.
