= Phil Hansen (American football) =

American football player (born 1968)

No. 90
- Position: Defensive end

Personal information
- Born: May 20, 1968 (age 58); Ellendale, North Dakota, U.S.
- Listed height: 6 ft 5 in (1.96 m)
- Listed weight: 278 lb (126 kg)

Career information
- High school: Oakes (Oakes, North Dakota)
- College: North Dakota State
- NFL draft: 1991: 2nd round, 54th overall pick

Career history
- Buffalo Bills (1991–2001)

Awards and highlights
- PFWA All-Rookie Team (1991); Buffalo Bills Wall of Fame

Career NFL statistics
- Tackles: 634
- Sacks: 61.5
- Forced fumbles: 8
- Interceptions: 1
- Stats at Pro Football Reference

Phillip Allen Hansen (born May 20, 1968) is an American former professional football player who was a defensive end for the Buffalo Bills of the National Football League (NFL). He was selected in the second round of the 1991 NFL draft. Hansen was named to the 1991 all-rookie team, and played on three Super Bowl teams. He played college football for the North Dakota State Bison, setting records with 41 regular-season sacks and 32 pass breakups, and started on Division II national championship teams in 1988 and 1990. He accumulated 61.5 sacks for the Bills and was inducted onto the Buffalo Bills Wall of Fame on September 18, 2011.

In 2012, Hansen ran as a Republican for election to the Minnesota Senate in the newly created district 4. The district includes Detroit Lakes, where he lives. He lost a close race to former state representative Kent Eken.

== NFL career statistics ==
Legend
	Led the league
**Bold**	Career high

=== Regular season ===
Year	Team	Games		Tackles				Interceptions				Fumbles			
Year	Team	GP	GS	Comb	Solo	Ast	Sck	Int	Yds	TD	Lng	FF	FR	Yds	TD
1991	BUF	14	10	40	40	0	2.0	0	0	0	0	0	1	0	0
1992	BUF	**16**	**16**	64	**64**	0	8.0	0	0	0	0	0	0	0	0
1993	BUF	11	9	43	43	0	3.5	0	0	0	0	**2**	0	0	0
1994	BUF	**16**	**16**	71	55	16	5.5	0	0	0	0	**2**	0	0	0
1995	BUF	**16**	**16**	76	53	**23**	**10.0**	0	0	0	0	0	1	0	0
1996	BUF	**16**	**16**	**80**	60	20	8.0	0	0	0	0	1	2	0	0
1997	BUF	**16**	**16**	79	58	21	6.0	0	0	0	0	**2**	0	0	0
1998	BUF	15	15	67	46	21	7.5	0	0	0	0	0	**3**	13	**1**
1999	BUF	14	14	56	39	17	6.0	0	0	0	0	1	2	24	0
2000	BUF	10	8	27	16	11	2.0	0	0	0	0	0	1	**29**	0
2001	BUF	12	12	31	22	9	3.0	**1**	**17**	0	**17**	0	0	0	0
		156	148	634	496	138	61.5	1	17	0	17	8	10	66	1

=== Playoffs ===
Year	Team	Games		Tackles				Interceptions				Fumbles			
Year	Team	GP	GS	Comb	Solo	Ast	Sck	Int	Yds	TD	Lng	FF	FR	Yds	TD
1991	BUF	3	0	0	0	0	0.0	0	0	0	0	0	0	0	0
1992	BUF	**4**	**4**	1	1	0	**2.0**	**1**	0	0	0	0	**2**	0	0
1993	BUF	3	3	0	0	0	1.0	0	0	0	0	0	0	0	0
1995	BUF	2	2	**11**	**10**	1	0.0	0	0	0	0	0	0	0	0
1996	BUF	1	1	4	4	0	0.0	0	0	0	0	0	0	0	0
1999	BUF	1	1	7	4	**3**	0.5	0	0	0	0	0	1	0	0
		14	11	23	19	4	3.5	1	0	0	0	0	3	0	0
