= Darick Holmes =

American football player (born 1971)

No. 44, 22
- Position: Running back

Personal information
- Born: July 1, 1971 (age 55); Pasadena, California, U.S.
- Listed height: 6 ft 0 in (1.83 m)
- Listed weight: 237 lb (108 kg)

Career information
- High school: John Muir (Pasadena)
- College: Portland State
- NFL draft: 1995: 7th round, 244th overall pick

Career history
- Buffalo Bills (1995–1998); Green Bay Packers (1998); Indianapolis Colts (1999)

Career NFL statistics
- Rushing yards: 1,769
- Average: 3.7
- Rushing touchdowns: 11
- Stats at Pro Football Reference

Darick Lamon Holmes (born July 1, 1971) is an American former professional football player who was a running back in the National Football League (NFL). He played for the Buffalo Bills from 1995 to 1998, Green Bay Packers in 1998 and Indianapolis Colts in 1999.

Holmes attended John Muir High School in Pasadena and then Pasadena City College before playing college football for the Portland State Vikings.

Pre-draft measurables
Height	Weight	Arm length	Hand span
6 ft 0 in (1.83 m)	226 lb (103 kg)	31 3/8 in (0.80 m)	10 1/8 in (0.26 m)

He was selected in the seventh round (244th overall pick) of the 1995 NFL draft by the Bills. In 1995, the 6'0", 226 pound halfback played in 16 games and had 172 rushing attempts for 698 yards (4.1 yards per carry) and scored four touchdowns. He also had 24 receptions for 214 yards (8.9 yards per reception). As a kick returner, Holmes had 39 returns for 799 yards (20.5 yards per return). In that postseason, he had 15 rushes for 87 yards and a touchdown in the Bills' first playoff game against the Miami Dolphins. In the next game, against the Pittsburgh Steelers, he had four rushes for 14 yards. In 1996, he played in 16 games and had 189 rushing attempts for 571 yards (3.0 yards per carry) and had four touchdowns. He also had 16 receptions for 102 yards (6.4 yards per reception) and had one receiving touchdown. In the Bills' postseason game against the Jacksonville Jaguars Holmes had nine rushes for 10 yards and one reception for eleven yards. In 1997, he played in thirteen games. He had 22 rushing attempts for 106 yards (4.8 yards per carry) and had two touchdowns. He had 13 receptions for 106 yards (8.2 yards per reception) as well. He had 23 kick returns for 430 yards (18.7 yards per return). In 1998, he played in three games and had two carries for 8 yards (4.0 yards per carry). He also had one 9 yard reception. Holmes returned one kick for twenty yards. Later in 1998, Darick signed with the Packers. For the Packers, he had 93 rushing attempts for 386 yards (4.2 yards per carry) with a touchdown, and he also had 19 receptions for 179 yards (9.4 yards per reception). In 1999, Holmes became a free agent again and signed with the Colts. He played in one game and had no action.
