= Filmel Johnson =

American football player (born 1970)

No. 39
- Position: Defensive back

Personal information
- Born: December 24, 1970 (age 55); Detroit, Michigan, U.S.
- Listed height: 5 ft 10 in (1.78 m)
- Listed weight: 187 lb (85 kg)

Career information
- High school: St. Mary's Preparatory (Orchard Lake Village, Michigan)
- College: Illinois
- NFL draft: 1994: 7th round, 221st overall pick

Career history
- Buffalo Bills (1994–1995)

Career NFL statistics
- Tackles: 5
- Stats at Pro Football Reference

Filmel C. Johnson (born December 24, 1970) is an American former professional football player who was a defensive back in the National Football League (NFL). He played college football for the Illinois Fighting Illini and was selected by the Buffalo Bills in the seventh round of the 1994 NFL draft with the 221st overall pick. He played for the Bills in 1995.
