= Yonel Jourdain =

American gridiron football player (born 1971)

No. 30, 33
- Position: Running back

Personal information
- Born: April 20, 1971 (age 55); Brooklyn, New York, U.S.
- Listed height: 5 ft 11 in (1.80 m)
- Listed weight: 204 lb (93 kg)

Career information
- High school: Evanston (IL) Township
- College: Southern Illinois
- NFL draft: 1993: undrafted

Career history
- Buffalo Bills (1993–1995); Philadelphia Eagles (1997)*; Hamilton Tiger-Cats (1997)
- * Offseason or practice squad member only

Career NFL statistics
- Rushing yards: 87
- Rushing average: 3.5
- Receptions: 11
- Receiving yards: 63
- Stats at Pro Football Reference

Yonel Jourdain (born April 20, 1971, in Brooklyn, New York) is an American former professional football player who was a running back for the Buffalo Bills of the National Football League (NFL) in 1994 and 1995. He played college football for the Southern Illinois Salukis.
