= Marlon Kerner =

American football player (born 1973)

No. 46
- Position: Cornerback

Personal information
- Born: March 18, 1973 (age 53); Columbus, Ohio, U.S.
- Listed height: 5 ft 10 in (1.78 m)
- Listed weight: 187 lb (85 kg)

Career information
- High school: Brookhaven (Columbus)
- College: Ohio State
- NFL draft: 1995: 3rd round, 76th overall pick

Career history
- Buffalo Bills (1995–1998)

Career NFL statistics
- Tackles: 75
- Interceptions: 3
- Sacks: 1
- Stats at Pro Football Reference

Marlon Lavalle Kerner (born March 18, 1973) is an American former professional football player who was a cornerback in the National Football League (NFL). He was selected by the Buffalo Bills in the third round of the 1995 NFL draft. He played college football for the Ohio State Buckeyes.
