= Rob Coons =

American gridiron football player (born 1969)

No. 87
- Position: Tight end

Personal information
- Born: September 18, 1969 (age 57); Brea, California, U.S.
- Listed height: 6 ft 5 in (1.96 m)
- Listed weight: 249 lb (113 kg)

Career information
- High school: El Dorado (Placentia, California)
- College: Fullerton (1989–1990); Pittsburgh (1991–1992)
- NFL draft: 1993: undrafted

Career history
- Miami Dolphins (1993–1994); Buffalo Bills (1995–1997)

Career NFL statistics
- Games played: 33
- Receptions: 4
- Receiving yards: 40
- Return yards: 16
- Stats at Pro Football Reference

Robert Allen Coons (born September 18, 1969) is an American former professional football tight end who played for the Miami Dolphins and the Buffalo Bills of the National Football League (NFL). He played college football for the Fullerton Hornets and the Pittsburgh Panthers.

== Early life ==
Coons was born on September 18, 1969, in Brea, California. He attended El Dorado High School in Placentia, California.

== College career ==
Coons played college football for the Fullerton College Hornets from 1989 to 1990 and the Pittsburgh Panthers from 1991 to 1992. In his two seasons at Pitt, he had 32 receptions for 337 yards and four touchdowns.

== Professional career ==
Pre-draft measurables
Height	Weight	Arm length	Hand span	40-yard dash	10-yard split	20-yard split	20-yard shuttle	Vertical jump	Broad jump	Bench press
6 ft 5 in (1.96 m)	239 lb (108 kg)	32 1/4 in (0.82 m)	10 in (0.25 m)	5.00 s	1.74 s	2.91 s	4.34 s	29 in (0.74 m)	9 ft 11 in (3.02 m)	10 reps
All values from Pro Day

=== Miami Dolphins ===
After going undrafted in the 1993 NFL draft, Coons signed with the Miami Dolphins as an undrafted free agent. He was released on August 30, 1993, and then signed to the practice squad the following day. Coons was waived on November 10, 1993, before signing again to the practice squad on November 18. He was re-signed on April 16, 1994. Coons was released on August 29 and placed on the injured reserve with a back injury. On November 23, he was waived.

=== Buffalo Bills ===
On April 19, 1995, Coons signed with the Buffalo Bills. He played in four games and recorded three receptions for 28 yards, all on December 24, 1995, against the Houston Oilers. In 1996, Coons played in all 16 games but only had one reception for 12 yards and a four-yard kick return in the Wild Card game against the Jacksonville Jaguars. He was a free agent following the 1996 season but re-signed with the team for 1997. Coons played in 12 games in 1997, returning a kickoff for 12 yards. He was a free agent following the season and did not sign with another team.
