= Tom Bresnahan =

American football coach (born 1935)(deceased 2025)

Personal information
- Born: January 21, 1935 (age 91); Springfield, Massachusetts

Career information
- College: Holy Cross

Career history
- Williams (1963–1968) Offensive line coach & defensive line coach; Columbia (1971) Offensive line coach; Navy (1973–1980) Offensive line coach; Kansas City Chiefs (1981–1982) Offensive line coach; New York Giants (1983–1984) Offensive line coach; St. Louis/Phoenix Cardinals (1986–1988) Offensive line coach; Buffalo Bills (1989–1991) Offensive line coach; Buffalo Bills (1992–1996) Offensive coordinator & offensive line coach; Buffalo Bills (1997) Offensive line coach; Massachusetts Maritime (2006–2009) Consultant

Tom Bresnahan (born January 21, 1935, in Springfield, Massachusetts) is an American former professional football coach, who served as the offensive coordinator of the Buffalo Bills from 1992 to 1996. He was promoted after serving as the team's offensive line coach and would hold both responsibilities.

After the end of the 1996 season, he left as his offensive coordinator title in favor of Dan Henning due to poor performance.
