= Corbin Lacina =

American football player and sports broadcaster (born 1970)

No. 68, 64, 63
- Position: Guard

Personal information
- Born: November 2, 1970 (age 56); Mankato, Minnesota, U.S.
- Listed height: 6 ft 4 in (1.93 m)
- Listed weight: 302 lb (137 kg)

Career information
- High school: Cretin-Derham Hall (Saint Paul, Minnesota)
- College: Augustana College
- NFL draft: 1993: 6th round, 167th overall pick

Career history
- Buffalo Bills (1993–1997); Carolina Panthers (1998); Minnesota Vikings (1999–2002); New England Patriots (2003)*; Chicago Bears (2003)
- * Offseason or practice squad member only

Career NFL statistics
- Games played: 129
- Games started: 80
- Fumble recoveries: 2
- Stats at Pro Football Reference

Corbin James Lacina (born November 2, 1970) is an American former professional football offensive lineman and Midwest Emmy award-winning sports broadcaster who played eleven seasons in the National Football League (NFL), mainly for the Buffalo Bills and Minnesota Vikings. He was selected 167th overall by the Bills in the sixth round of the 1993 NFL draft. He played high school football for Cretin-Derham Hall High School and college football at Augustana College. During his NFL career he was given the nickname Karate Corbin, because he is an 8th degree black belt.
