= Corey Louchiey =

American football player (born 1971)

No. 72
- Position: Offensive tackle

Personal information
- Born: October 10, 1971 (age 55); Greenville, South Carolina, U.S.
- Listed height: 6 ft 8 in (2.03 m)
- Listed weight: 305 lb (138 kg)

Career information
- College: Tennessee; South Carolina
- NFL draft: 1994: 3rd round, 98th overall pick

Career history
- Buffalo Bills (1994–1997); Atlanta Falcons (1998)

Career NFL statistics
- Games played: 45
- Games started: 13
- Stats at Pro Football Reference

Corey Louchiey (born October 10, 1971) is an American former professional football player who was an offensive tackle for the Buffalo Bills of the National Football League (NFL) from 1994 to 1997. He played college football for the Tennessee Volunteers and South Carolina Gamecocks. He was selected by the Bills in the third round of the 1994 NFL draft.
