= Ruben Brown =

American football player (born 1972)

No. 74, 79
- Position: Guard

Personal information
- Born: February 13, 1972 (age 54); Englewood, New Jersey, U.S.
- Listed height: 6 ft 3 in (1.91 m)
- Listed weight: 300 lb (136 kg)

Career information
- High school: Glass (Lynchburg, Virginia)
- College: Pittsburgh
- NFL draft: 1995: 1st round, 14th overall pick

Career history
- Buffalo Bills (1995–2003); Chicago Bears (2004–2007)

Awards and highlights
- 4× Second-team All-Pro (1998–2000, 2002); 9× Pro Bowl (1996–2003, 2006); PFWA All-Rookie Team (1995); Buffalo Bills 50th Anniversary Team; 3× All-Big East (1992–1994)

Career NFL statistics
- Games played: 181
- Games started: 181
- Fumble recoveries: 2
- Stats at Pro Football Reference
- College Football Hall of Fame

Ruben Parnell Brown (born February 13, 1972) is an American former professional football player who was a guard for 13 seasons in the National Football League (NFL). He played college football for the Pittsburgh Panthers. He was selected by the Buffalo Bills 14th overall in the 1995 NFL draft.

Brown played nine seasons for the Bills and four more for the Chicago Bears, starting all 181 games in which he played. He was a four-time All-Pro and nine-time Pro Bowl selection, including eight consecutive Pro Bowl selections with the Bills from 1996 to 2003. He is the older brother of former NFL linebacker Cornell Brown.

Brown attended E. C. Glass High School in Lynchburg, Virginia.

== Professional career ==
Pre-draft measurables
Height	Weight	Arm length	Hand span	40-yard dash	10-yard split	20-yard split	20-yard shuttle	Vertical jump	Broad jump	Bench press
6 ft 3 1/8 in (1.91 m)	304 lb (138 kg)	34 1/2 in (0.88 m)	9 1/4 in (0.23 m)	5.48 s	2.00 s	3.20 s	4.72 s	27.0 in (0.69 m)	8 ft 10 in (2.69 m)	22 reps

=== Buffalo Bills ===
Brown was the starting left guard for the Buffalo Bills, where he was named to eight consecutive AFC Pro Bowl teams from 1996 to 2003. He was also a four-time 2nd-team All-Pro. Brown was a three-time nominee for the Walter Payton NFL Man of the Year Award during his tenure with Buffalo.

=== Chicago Bears ===
Brown signed with the Chicago Bears in 2004, but only started in nine games due to injuries. He had a revival in his career in the 2006 season after the Bears made Super Bowl XLI, and was named to the 2007 Pro Bowl. In 2007, Brown played in eight games before being placed on injured reserve by the Bears on November 8, 2007, due to an injured shoulder.

Brown became a free agent after the 2007 season. He expressed interest in returning to Chicago, commenting his three-year stint with the Bears rejuvenated his career. The Bears did not re-sign Brown.

=== Retirement ===
After spending the 2008 season out of football, Brown officially announced his retirement on February 2, 2009. When Brown retired, he was one of nine guards to be named to the Pro Bowl nine times in a career.

=== Broadcasting career ===
Brown currently co-hosts The Enforcers, a weekly television show in Buffalo, NY, with former Buffalo Sabres player Rob Ray. Brown is also a regular pundit on Canadian talkshow "Off the Record", which airs on TSN. He also served as an analyst for the syndication network broadcasting the Fall Experimental Football League.

Brown has co-hosted, along with Mike Catalana, Bills Tonight, the Bills' official weekly post game on MSG Western New York, since 2016.
