= 1996 New England Patriots season =

37th season in franchise history; second Super Bowl loss

- Owner: Robert Kraft
- Head coach: Bill Parcells
- Offensive coordinator: Ray Perkins
- Defensive coordinator: Al Groh
- Home stadium: Foxboro Stadium

Results
- Record: 11–5
- Division place: 1st AFC East
- Playoffs: Won Divisional Playoffs (vs. Steelers) 28–3; Won AFC Championship (vs. Jaguars) 20–6; Lost Super Bowl XXXI (vs. Packers) 21–35
- All-Pros: T Bruce Armstrong (2nd team); KR Dave Meggett (2nd team)
- Pro Bowlers: T Bruce Armstrong; QB Drew Bledsoe; TE Ben Coates; RB Curtis Martin; DE Willie McGinest; KR Dave Meggett

The 1996 New England Patriots season was the franchise's 27th season in the National Football League (NFL) and the 37th overall. The Patriots finished with a record of 11–5 and finished first in the AFC East division. After a disappointing 1995 season, Drew Bledsoe bounced back with 4,086 passing yards and threw 27 touchdown passes to 15 interceptions while Curtis Martin had another Pro Bowl season. The team's two playoff wins came by double-digit margins: first in the divisional playoff game and then in the AFC Championship Game, which was the franchise's first in 11 years. The Patriots would go on to lose Super Bowl XXXI to the Green Bay Packers 35–21.

== Offseason ==
Additions	Subtractions
P Tom Tupa (Browns)	P Bryan Wagner (Lions)
S Willie Clay (Lions)	T Pat Harlow (Raiders)
WR Shawn Jefferson (Chargers)	DE Aaron Jones (Dolphins)
FB Keith Byars (Dolphins)	K Matt Bahr (retirement)
DT Pio Sagapolutele (Browns)	
DT Mark Wheeler (Buccaneers)	

=== 1996 NFL draft ===
1996 New England Patriots draft
Round	Pick	Player	Position	College	Notes
1	7	Terry Glenn *	Wide receiver	Ohio State	
2	36	Lawyer Milloy *	Safety	Washington	
3	86	Tedy Bruschi *	Linebacker	Arizona	from Detroit
4	101	Heath Irwin	Guard	Colorado	
4	119	Chris Sullivan	Defensive tackle	Boston College	from Detroit
4	124	Kantroy Barber	Fullback	West Virginia	from San Francisco via Oakland
5	139	John Elmore	Guard	Texas	
5	149	Christian Peter	Defensive tackle	Nebraska	from Oakland
6	173	Chris Griffin	Tight end	New Mexico	
6	195	Marrio Grier	Fullback	Tennessee-Chattanooga	from Detroit
6	206	Devin Wyman	Defensive tackle	Kentucky State	
7	216	Lovett Purnell	Tight end	West Virginia	
7	247	J. R. Conrad	Guard	Oklahoma	
Made roster * Made at least one Pro Bowl during career

=== Undrafted free agents ===
1996 Undrafted free agents of note
Player	Position	College
Ray Lucas	Quarterback	Rutgers
Adam Vinatieri	Kicker	South Dakota State

== Staff ==
1996 New England Patriots staff
Front office: Owner and chief executive officer – Robert Kraft; Vice president and owner's representative – Jonathan Kraft; Vice president of business operations – Andy Wasynczuk; Director of player personnel – Bobby Grier; Director of college scouting – Charley Armey; Assistant director of pro scouting – Dave Uyrus; Head coaches: Head coach – Bill Parcells; Assistant head coach/secondary – Bill Belichick; Offensive coaches: Offensive coordinator – Ray Perkins; Quarterbacks – Chris Palmer; Running backs – Maurice Carthon; Wide receivers – Charlie Weis; Tight ends – Mike Pope; Offensive line – Fred Hoaglin	Defensive coaches: Defensive coordinator/linebackers – Al Groh; Defensive line – Romeo Crennel; Defensive assistant/linebackers – Dante Scarnecchia; Special teams coaches: Special teams – Mike Sweatman; Strength and conditioning: Strength and conditioning – Johnny Parker

== Final roster ==
1996 New England Patriots roster
Quarterbacks (QB): 11 Drew Bledsoe; 16 Scott Zolak; Running backs (RB): 41 Keith Byars FB; 35 Marrio Grier; 28 Curtis Martin; 22 Dave Meggett KR/PR; Wide receivers (WR): 82 Vincent Brisby; 80 Troy Brown KR; 88 Terry Glenn; 81 Hason Graham; 84 Shawn Jefferson; 18 Dietrich Jells; 15 Ray Lucas; Tight ends (TE): 86 Mike Bartrum TE/LS; 85 John Burke; 87 Ben Coates; 48 Lovett Purnell	Offensive linemen (OL): 78 Bruce Armstrong T; 67 Mike Gisler C/G; 63 Heath Irwin G; 61 Bob Kratch G; 68 Max Lane T; 62 David Richards T/G; 76 William Roberts G; 71 Todd Rucci G; 64 Dave Wohlabaugh C; Defensive linemen (DL): 92 Ferric Collons DE; 90 Chad Eaton DT; 96 Mike Jones DE; 55 Willie McGinest DE; 75 Pio Sagapolutele DT; 74 Chris Sullivan DE; 97 Mark Wheeler DT; 72 Devin Wyman DT	Linebackers (LB): 54 Tedy Bruschi OLB; 59 Todd Collins OLB; 52 Ted Johnson MLB; 58 Marty Moore MLB; 95 Dwayne Sabb OLB; 53 Chris Slade OLB; Defensive backs (DB): 30 Corwin Brown FS; 32 Willie Clay FS; 26 Jerome Henderson CB; 31 Jimmy Hitchcock CB; 24 Ty Law CB; 27 Mike McGruder CB; 36 Lawyer Milloy SS; 23 Terry Ray SS; 21 Ricky Reynolds CB; 45 Otis Smith CB; 25 Larry Whigham SS; Special teams (ST): 19 Tom Tupa P; 4 Adam Vinatieri K	Practice squad: 70 J. R. Conrad G; 29 Derrick Cullors RB; Reserve: 46 Kantroy Barber FB (IR); 93 Monty Brown LB (IR); 33 Sam Gash FB (IR); 34 Rupert Grant FB (IR); 43 Vernon Lewis CB (IR); Rookies in italics 53 active, 5 reserve, 2 practice squad

== Schedule ==
Week	Date	Opponent	Result	Record	Venue	Attendance
1	September 1	at **Miami Dolphins**	**L** 10–24	0–1	Pro Player Stadium	71,542
2	September 8	at **Buffalo Bills**	**L** 10–17	0–2	Rich Stadium	78,104
3	September 15	Arizona Cardinals	**W** 31–0	1–2	Foxboro Stadium	59,118
4	September 22	Jacksonville Jaguars	**W** 28–25 (OT)	2–2	Foxboro Stadium	59,446
5	Bye					
6	October 6	at Baltimore Ravens	**W** 46–38	3–2	Memorial Stadium	63,569
7	October 13	Washington Redskins	**L** 22–27	3–3	Foxboro Stadium	59,638
8	October 20	at **Indianapolis Colts**	**W** 27–9	4–3	RCA Dome	58,725
9	October 27	**Buffalo Bills**	**W** 28–25	5–3	Foxboro Stadium	58,858
10	November 3	**Miami Dolphins**	**W** 42–23	6–3	Foxboro Stadium	58,942
11	November 10	at **New York Jets**	**W** 31–27	7–3	Giants Stadium	61,843
12	November 17	Denver Broncos	**L** 8–34	7–4	Foxboro Stadium	59,457
13	November 24	**Indianapolis Colts**	**W** 27–13	8–4	Foxboro Stadium	58,226
14	December 1	at San Diego Chargers	**W** 45–7	9–4	Jack Murphy Stadium	62,541
15	December 8	**New York Jets**	**W** 34–10	10–4	Foxboro Stadium	54,621
16	December 15	at Dallas Cowboys	**L** 6–12	10–5	Texas Stadium	64,578
17	December 21	at New York Giants	**W** 23–22	11–5	Giants Stadium	65,387
Note: Intra-division opponents are in **bold** text.

== Postseason ==
=== Schedule ===
Round	Date	Opponent (seed)	Result	Record	Venue	Attendance
Divisional	January 5, 1997	Pittsburgh Steelers (3)	W 28–3	1–0	Foxboro Stadium	60,188
AFC Championship	January 12, 1997	Jacksonville Jaguars (5)	W 20–6	2–0	Foxboro Stadium	60,190
Super Bowl XXXI	January 26, 1997	vs. Green Bay Packers (N1)	L 21–35	2–1	Louisiana Superdome	72,301

== Standings ==
AFC East
	W	L	T	PCT	PF	PA	STK
^{(2)} New England Patriots	11	5	0	.688	418	313	W1
^{(4)} Buffalo Bills	10	6	0	.625	319	266	W1
^{(6)} Indianapolis Colts	9	7	0	.563	317	334	L1
Miami Dolphins	8	8	0	.500	339	325	W2
New York Jets	1	15	0	.063	279	454	L7

== Season summary ==
=== Week 1 ===
Despite a field goal from rookie kicker Adam Vinatieri and a Drew Bledsoe touchdown pass to tight end Ben Coates, the Patriots couldn't overcome two second quarter fumbles as the Dolphins routed the Patriots 24–10 in the season opener.

=== Week 2 ===
Despite being intercepted three times, Jim Kelly burned the Patriots as his Bills won 17–10. The game was tied at 10 in the fourth quarter when a blitz was picked up and Kelly found Quinn Early for a 63-yard touchdown; the Patriots drove to the Bills 5-yard line in the final seconds but were stopped on a draw play to Dave Meggett. The Buffalo win put the Patriots' record at 0–2.

=== Week 3 ===
Former New York Jet Boomer Esiason faced the Patriots in New England's home opener of 1996, and after the Patriots defense limited Boomer to four completions for 22 yards and two INTs he was benched and Kent Graham took over, throwing one pick and nineteen passes (for just nine completions) and 111 yards. Drew Bledsoe threw three touchdowns, two to Curtis Martin, who also rushed in an additional score in a 31–0 shutout. The only aspect of the Patriots' game that struggled was rookie PK Adam Vinatieri, who booted a 31-yard field goal in the fourth but missed a PAT and missed another field goal try, earning a mild rebuke from coach Bill Parcells in the postgame press conference.

=== Week 4 ===
The Patriots led 22–0 in the final seconds of the first half after three field goals by rookie Adam Vinatieri and touchdowns by Ben Coates and Curtis Martin (a Vinatieri PAT was blocked), but from his 49-yard line, Jaguars quarterback Mark Brunell escaped a sack and threw a desperation heave to the endzone; in the endzone scramble the ball was kicked in the air by Willie Clay of the Patriots and caught by the Jaguars' Jimmy Smith for a touchdown. Brunell completed long-bomb touchdown throws to Andre Rison, and following a Martin fumble the Jaguars tied the game at 25. Patriots FB/TE Keith Byars caught a late pass at the Jaguars 20-yard line but it bobbled out and was intercepted by Dave Thomas of the Jaguars; Thomas ran it back for a touchdown but it was wiped out on a cut-block penalty on teammate Chris Hudson at the Jacksonville 33-yard line. With three seconds to go Brunell uncorked another desperation heave to the endzone; it was caught with one hand by Jaguars receiver Willie Jackson off the chest of Willie McGinest, but Jackson was ruled down at the one-foot line. The Patriots finally won on a 40-yard Vinatieri field goal in OT, the first game-winning FG in Vinatieri's career.

=== Week 6 ===
The Patriots made their first trip to Baltimore since losing to the Colts in October 1983; this time their foe was the former Cleveland Browns that had been coached by New England's assistant head coach and defensive backs coach Bill Belichick the year before. Now known as the Baltimore Ravens, they proved to be an offensive challenge (ironic as the Ravens would evolve into one of the league's strongest defenses) as Earnest Byner and Carwell Gardner rushed for 133 yards while future Patriot Vinny Testaverde threw for 353 yards and three touchdowns. Drew Bledsoe outdid Testaverde with four scores, but New England leads of 35–14 and 46–22 weren't exceptionally secure as the Ravens scored 24 points in the fourth quarter. It wasn't enough to stop a 46–38 Patriots win. Rookie linebacker Tedy Bruschi ran in his first career touchdown when he caught a blocked Ravens punt near their goal line.

=== Week 7 ===
The Redskins rallied from down 16–10 behind two third-quarter scores by Gus Frerotte. With the Patriots now down 24–16 late in the fourth quarter, a deep pass to Terry Glenn set up Curtis Martin's second touchdown of the game, but Martin's two-point run was blown up well short of the endzone. The Redskins added a late field goal for the 27–22 win.

=== Week 8 ===
The Patriots fumbled twice and managed just 222 yards of offense, but the Colts fumbled four times and managed just three Cary Blanchard field goals. Jim Harbaugh had 223 passing yards and backup Paul Justin had 119, yet the Patriots won 27–9, their first win over Indianapolis since 1994.

=== Week 9 ===
The Bills rallied from a 13–0 halftime Patriots lead. An intentional-grounding penalty on Jim Kelly in the endzone was ruled a Patriots safety, but the Bills took an 18–15 lead on a Thurman Thomas run and a Darick Holmes two-point conversion. With 1:25 to go Curtis Martin stormed through for a ten-yard touchdown, but Adam Vinatieri's extra point was missed. Willie McGinest then ran back an interception for a 46-yard touchdown, but Kelly launched a desperation heave with 33 seconds to go and it was batted off the fingers of Patriot defenders and caught for the touchdown by Andre Reed. The Bills' onside kick attempt was then caught by Keith Byars, sealing a 28–25 Patriots win.

=== Week 10 ===
Miami's playoff hopes in their first year under Jimmy Johnson had taken a blow the week before in a loss to Dallas, and they suffered even more at Foxboro. Karim Abdul-Jabbar and Curtis Martin exchanged rushing scores for a 14–14 tie at the half, then after the Patriots took a 21–17 lead in the fourth quarter, Drew Bledsoe finished off the Dolphins, first on a short pass that Ben Coates carried 84 yards for a touchdown, then on a subsequent drive ending in a five-yard Sam Gash touchdown catch, finally on another drive ending in Martin's third rushing score of the day. Dan Marino was benched and backup Craig Erickson completed a 29-yard touchdown to O.J. McDuffie, but it could not stop a 42–23 Patriots win.

=== Week 11 ===
The Jets held Drew Bledsoe without a completion in the first quarter. Behind quarterback Frank Reich and running back Adrian Murrell, the Jets stormed to a 21–0 lead before the Patriots began clawing back. Trailing 27–24 late in the fourth quarter, Bledsoe (24 of 30 for 297 yards after being shut out in the first half) completed a first-down throw to Ben Coates on 4th and 2 to the Jets 49-yard line; the Jets disputed the ball spot by line judge Charles Stewart but the call stood. Bledsoe then completed a four-yard touchdown to Keith Byars, but the Jets roared downfield on a long throw from Reich to Jeff Graham to the Patriots 11-yard line. On the next play Reich's pass was batted away by Lawyer Milloy for a 31–27 Patriots win. "They're the best 1–9 football team in history, I guess", Bledsoe said afterward.

=== Week 12 ===
The Patriots suffered their ninth straight loss to the Broncos as Terrell Davis ran roughshod over them to the tune of 152 rushing yards, two rushing touchdowns, and a 15-yard touchdown catch from John Elway, who ran in another touchdown himself in a 34–8 runaway win. This was Elway's eighth straight win over the Patriots in the regular season plus a 1986 playoff win. Underscoring this, Broncos tight end Shannon Sharpe, who was held in check by the Patriots with just 37 receiving yards, was inspired by the rout to taunt booing Patriot fans by simulating a phone call to President Bill Clinton requesting the National Guard "because we are killing the Patriots!" The clip by NFL Films is among the most replayed in retrospectives on Sharpe's career.

=== Week 13 ===
The 7–4 Patriots hosted the 6–5 Colts as the AFC East looked to be another Buffalo Bills runaway with the Bills a game ahead of New England and two ahead of both Indianapolis and Miami. The Patriots took over the game from the opening quarter as Drew Bledsoe tossed touchdowns to Shawn Jefferson and Terry Glenn for a 17–0 halftime lead. A pair of Cary Blanchard field goals were answered by New England as Adam Vinatieri booted a second field goal and Curtis Martin's 141 rushing yards included a twelve-yard rushing score in the fourth quarter. Jim Harbaugh was injured when Willie Clay was flipped over the line of scrimmage and landed on Harbaugh, who suffered a sprained left MCL. Backup QB Paul Justin drove the Colts downfield and threw a five-yard score to Marvin Harrison for a 27–13 Patriots final.

=== Week 14 ===
The Patriots crushed the Chargers 45–7 at Jack Murphy Stadium a week after San Diego went 7–5 in a win at Kansas City. Drew Bledsoe threw three touchdowns in the first half while Willie McGinest ran down a deflected fumble from the ten-yard line and scored. Chargers QB Stan Humphries suffered a concussion and was benched in favor of Sean Salisbury. Former Patriot Leonard Russell managed just 35 rushing yards.

=== Week 15 ===
The Patriots continued their scoring explosion with a 34–10 rout of the one-win Jets. The two teams combined for just over 600 yards of offense and three interceptions, two thrown by Jets QB Glenn Foley; Foley was also sacked four times, once by rookie Tedy Bruschi. The game was a penalty-laden affair, with 19 combined fouls for 140 yards.

=== Week 16 ===
Offense was smothered for the most part by both sides as the Patriots and Cowboys entered the game within reach of clinching their divisions and amid burgeoning rumors that Bill Parcells was going to leave New England. Drew Bledsoe and Troy Aikman were repeatedly stymied in the red zone (one Aikman incompletion went between the uprights, prompting Chris Berman to joke afterward, "The kick is up....good!") and they combined for five interceptions and just 346 passing yards; Ty Law accounted for both Aikman picks while Bledsoe was picked off twice by Darren Woodson. Adam Vinatieri booted two field goals and also ran down Herschel Walker on a long kick return; this led Parcells after the game to say to Vinatieri, "You're not a kicker, you're a football player." Dallas kicker Chris Boniol booted four field goals, but the game wasn't decided until Parcells went for it on two fourth downs in the fourth quarter and failed on both. The win clinched the NFC East for the Cowboys.

=== Week 17 ===
The Patriots visited Giants Stadium for the final game of the regular season and fell behind 22–0; Drew Bledsoe was hammered in the endzone as he threw and was called for intentional grounding, making for a Giants safety; he was then picked off by Jason Sehorn for a 23-yard touchdown. Bledsoe stormed back with touchdown throws to Terry Glenn and Ben Coates (Coates needed to bull past two defenders to reach the endzone) to go with a Vinatieri 40-yard FG and a Dave Meggett 60-yard punt return touchdown. The Patriots won 23–22. Parcells specifically praised Glenn after the game for playing hurt and coming up with big plays in crunch time, showing that their relationship had improved immeasurably after a rocky start.
