= 1997 New England Patriots season =

38th season in franchise history

- Owner: Robert Kraft
- Head coach: Pete Carroll
- Offensive coordinator: Larry Kennan
- Defensive coordinator: Steve Sidwell
- Home stadium: Foxboro Stadium

Results
- Record: 10–6
- Division place: 1st AFC East
- Playoffs: Won Wild Card Playoffs (vs. Dolphins) 17–3; Lost Divisional Playoffs (at Steelers) 6–7
- All-Pros: LB Chris Slade (2nd team)
- Pro Bowlers: T Bruce Armstrong; QB Drew Bledsoe; TE Ben Coates; LB Chris Slade; ST Larry Whigham

The 1997 season was the New England Patriots' 28th season in the National Football League (NFL) and the 38th overall. They finished the season with a 10–6 record and a division title before losing in the playoffs to the Pittsburgh Steelers. This was the last season in which New England won the division title without Tom Brady or Bill Belichick until 2025.

In January, when the Patriots were preparing to face the Green Bay Packers in Super Bowl XXXI, it was suspected head coach Bill Parcells was looking to move to another team after the game where he would have more say over personnel matters. In the 1996 NFL draft, Parcells' relationship with owner Robert Kraft soured when Kraft selected wide receiver Terry Glenn. After the Patriots' loss in Super Bowl XXXI, Parcells resigned from the Patriots, using the phrase "If they want you to cook the dinner, at least they ought to let you shop for some of the groceries." Due to an earlier renegotiation that had eliminated the 1997 season from Parcells' contract, NFL Commissioner Paul Tagliabue ruled Parcells could not be a head coach for another team in 1997. Parcells instead moved to the New York Jets as a "consultant", taking assistant head coach Bill Belichick with him to be the Jets' head coach; Kraft called this a "transparent farce" and accused the Jets of tampering with Parcells. The NFL ruled in the Patriots' favor and the Patriots received third and fourth-round picks in the 1997 NFL draft, a second-round pick in the 1998 NFL draft, and a first-round pick in the 1999 NFL draft in compensation for allowing Parcells to become the Jets' head coach.

Taking Parcells' place with the Patriots was Pete Carroll, who had coincidentally been the Jets' head coach in 1994. The Patriots began the season 5–1 but then stumbled to a 6–5 record. They rebounded to finish 10–6 and first in the AFC East for the second straight season. With the third seed in the AFC playoffs, the Patriots defeated the Miami Dolphins 17–3 in the Wild Card Game but were defeated by the Pittsburgh Steelers, 7–6, on the road the next week.

== 1997 NFL draft ==
1997 New England Patriots Draft Selections
Round	Overall	Player	Position	College
1	29	Chris Canty	Cornerback	Kansas State
2	59	Brandon Mitchell	Defensive tackle	Texas A&M
3 (Note: The Patriots received third- and fourth-round picks in 1997, a second-round pick in 1998, and a first-round pick in 1999 from the New York Jets as compensation for the Jets' 1997 signing of Bill Parcells as head coach.)	61	Sedrick Shaw	Running back	Iowa
3	89	Chris Carter	Safety	Texas
4	97	Damon Denson	Offensive guard	Michigan
4	125	Ed Ellis	Offensive tackle	Buffalo
5	159	Vernon Crawford	Linebacker	Florida State
6	192	Tony Gaiter	Wide receiver	Miami (FL)
7	230	Scott Rehberg	Offensive guard	Central Michigan

== Staff ==
1997 New England Patriots staff
Front office: Chairman/CEO – Robert Kraft; Vice-president – Jonathan Kraft; Vice president of business operations – Andy Wasynczuk; Vice president of player personnel – Bobby Grier; Director of college scouting – Larry Cook; Director of pro scouting – Dave Uyrus; Head coaches: Head coach – Pete Carroll; Assistant head coach/quarterbacks – Carl Smith; Offensive coaches: Offensive coordinator – Larry Kennan; Running backs – Kirby Wilson; Wide receivers – Steve Walters; Tight ends – Jeff Davidson; Offensive line – Paul Boudreau	Defensive coaches: Defensive coordinator – Steve Sidwell; Defensive line – Ray Hamilton; Linebackers – Bo Pelini; Defensive backs – Ron Lynn; Defensive assistant – Andre Patterson; Special teams coaches: Special teams – Dante Scarnecchia; Strength and conditioning: Strength and conditioning – Johnny Parker

== Schedule ==
Week	Date	Opponent	Result	Record	Venue	Attendance
1	August 31	San Diego Chargers	**W** 41–7	1–0	Foxboro Stadium	60,190
2	September 7	at **Indianapolis Colts**	**W** 31–6	2–0	RCA Dome	53,632
3	September 14	**New York Jets**	**W** 27–24 (OT)	3–0	Foxboro Stadium	60,072
4	September 21	Chicago Bears	**W** 31–3	4–0	Foxboro Stadium	59,873
5	Bye					
6	October 6	at Denver Broncos	**L** 13–34	4–1	Mile High Stadium	75,821
7	October 12	**Buffalo Bills**	**W** 33–6	5–1	Foxboro Stadium	59,802
8	October 19	at **New York Jets**	**L** 19–24	5–2	Giants Stadium	71,061
9	October 27	Green Bay Packers	**L** 10–28	5–3	Foxboro Stadium	59,972
10	November 2	at Minnesota Vikings	**L** 18–23	5–4	Hubert H. Humphrey Metrodome	62,917
11	November 9	at **Buffalo Bills**	**W** 31–10	6–4	Rich Stadium	65,783
12	November 16	at Tampa Bay Buccaneers	**L** 7–27	6–5	Houlihan's Stadium	70,479
13	November 23	**Miami Dolphins**	**W** 27–24	7–5	Foxboro Stadium	59,002
14	November 30	**Indianapolis Colts**	**W** 20–17	8–5	Foxboro Stadium	58,507
15	December 7	at Jacksonville Jaguars	**W** 26–20	9–5	Alltel Stadium	73,446
16	December 13	Pittsburgh Steelers	**L** 21–24 (OT)	9–6	Foxboro Stadium	60,013
17	December 22	at **Miami Dolphins**	**W** 14–12	10–6	Pro Player Stadium	74,379
Note: Intra-division opponents are in **bold** text.

== Postseason ==
=== Schedule ===
Round	Date	Opponent (Seed)	Result	Record	Venue	Attendance
Wild Card	December 28	Miami Dolphins (6)	W 17–3	1–0	Foxboro Stadium	60,041
Divisional	January 3	at Pittsburgh Steelers (2)	L 6–7	1–1	Three Rivers Stadium	61,228

== Standings ==
AFC East
	W	L	T	PCT	PF	PA	STK
^{(3)} New England Patriots	10	6	0	.625	369	289	W1
^{(6)} Miami Dolphins	9	7	0	.563	339	327	L2
New York Jets	9	7	0	.563	348	287	L1
Buffalo Bills	6	10	0	.375	255	367	L3
Indianapolis Colts	3	13	0	.188	313	401	L1

== Notable games ==
- August 31 v San Diego Chargers:

The Pete Carroll era of the Patriots started with a bang as Drew Bledsoe threw for 340 yards and four touchdowns in a 41–7 runaway. Stan Humphries managed a touchdown throw but was pulled in the fourth quarter for Jim Everett; Everett was intercepted and Willie Clay ran back a 53-yard touchdown.

- September 14 v New York Jets:

The first game against former Patriots coach Bill Parcells came on Sunday Night Football with the Patriots 2–0 and the Jets 1–1. The game became a grinder in which the lead tied or changed seven times. Drew Bledsoe threw touchdowns to Ben Coates and Lovett Purnell but threw two picks (one returned by Mo Lewis for a touchdown) and was limited to just 162 passing yards. His Jets counterpart Neil O'Donnell ran in one touchdown and threw another to Keyshawn Johnson that tied the game in the fourth, but was sacked seven times; the Jets also coughed up three fumbles. Curtis Martin's running game erupted to 199 yards and a touchdown, but the Patriots faced Jets kicker John Hall in the final sixteen seconds with the game tied at 24. Hall's field goal try was blocked and in overtime the Patriots drove down field and Adam Vinatieri nailed a 34-yard field goal for the 27–24 Patriots win.

- Monday Night Football October 6 v Denver Broncos:

The first game between the last two unbeaten NFL teams since 1973 after the Buccaneers lost on Sunday, the Broncos won for the tenth straight time over the Patriots, 34–13. Despite throwing two interceptions and being limited to just 192 passing yards, John Elway ran in a touchdown and Terrell Davis rushed for 171 yards and two scores.

- October 19 @ New York Jets:

The 5–1 Patriots fell to Parcells' Jets 24–19 as the Jets outscored the Patriots 21–14 in the second half. Neil O'Donnell was flagged for intentional grounding in the endzone for a Patriots safety, then was pulled for Glenn Foley; Foley threw for 200 yards and a touchdown.

== Final roster ==
New England Patriots 1997 final roster
Quarterbacks: 11 Drew Bledsoe; 16 Scott Zolak; Running backs: 41 Keith Byars FB; 29 Derrick Cullors; 33 Sam Gash FB; 35 Marrio Grier FB; 28 Curtis Martin; 29 Dave Meggett KR; 23 Sedrick Shaw ^{R}; Wide receivers: 82 Vincent Brisby; 80 Troy Brown; 17 Tony Gaiter ^{R}; 88 Terry Glenn; 84 Shawn Jefferson; 83 Dietrich Jells; Tight ends: 87 Ben Coates; 85 Lovett Purnell	Offensive linemen: 78 Bruce Armstrong T; 61 Damon Denson G ^{R}; 66 Ed Ellis T ^{R}; 67 Mike Gisler C; 63 Heath Irwin G; 68 Max Lane G; 77 Zefross Moss T; 60 Scott Rehberg T ^{R}; 71 Todd Rucci G; 64 Dave Wohlabaugh C; Defensive linemen: 90 Chad Eaton DT; 96 Mike Jones DE/DT; 55 Willie McGinest DE; 98 Brandon Mitchell DE ^{R}; 74 Chris Sullivan DE; 95 Henry Thomas DT; 97 Mark Wheeler DT; 72 Devin Wyman DT	Linebackers: 54 Tedy Bruschi OLB; 59 Todd Collins OLB; 99 Vernon Crawford OLB ^{R}; 52 Ted Johnson ILB; 58 Marty Moore ILB; 51 Bernard Russ OLB ^{UR}; 53 Chris Slade OLB; Defensive backs: 26 Chris Canty CB ^{R}; 42 Chris Carter FS ^{R}; 32 Willie Clay FS; 31 Jimmy Hitchcock CB; 21 Steve Israel CB; 24 Ty Law CB; 36 Lawyer Milloy SS; 25 Larry Whigham FS; Special teams: 19 Tom Tupa P; 75 Danny Villa LS; 4 Adam Vinatieri K	Reserve lists: 86 Mike Bartrum TE/LS (IR); 92 Ferric Collons DE (IR); 38 Steve Lofton CB (IR); Practice squad: 91 Steve Brannon DE; 18 Anthony Ladd WR ^{UR}; 65 Juan Porter C/G ^{UR}; 39 Mark Tate CB ^{UR}; 10 Shawn Turner WR ^{UR}; 53 active, 3 inactive, 5 practice squad Notations: R: 1997 Rookie; UR: 1997 Undrafted Rookie
