= Lawyer Milloy =

American football player. (born 1973)

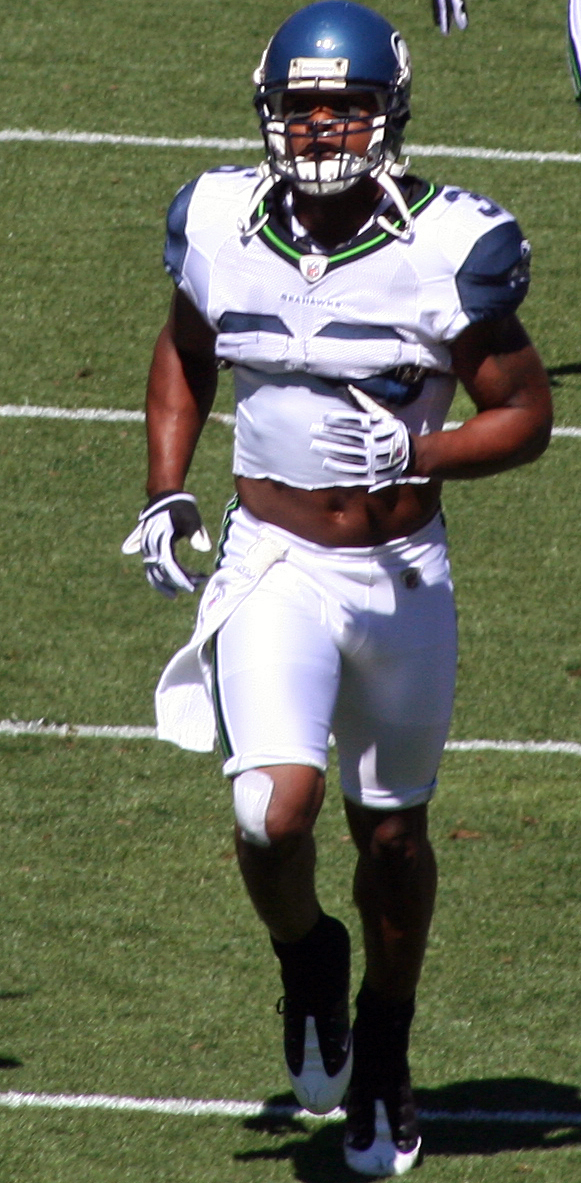
- Milloy with the Seattle Seahawks in 2010

No. 36
- Position: Safety

Personal information
- Born: November 14, 1973 (age 52); St. Louis, Missouri, U.S.
- Listed height: 6 ft 0 in (1.83 m)
- Listed weight: 211 lb (96 kg)

Career information
- High school: Lincoln (Tacoma, Washington)
- College: Washington (1992–1995)
- NFL draft: 1996: 2nd round, 36th overall pick

Career history
- New England Patriots (1996–2002); Buffalo Bills (2003–2005); Atlanta Falcons (2006–2008); Seattle Seahawks (2009–2010)

Awards and highlights
- Super Bowl champion (XXXVI); First-team All-Pro (1999); Second-team All-Pro (1998); 4× Pro Bowl (1998–1999, 2001–2002); PFWA All-Rookie Team (1996); New England Patriots All-1990s Team; New England Patriots All-2000s Team; Jack Tatum Trophy (1995); Unanimous All-American (1995); 2× First-team All-Pac-10 (1994, 1995)

Career NFL statistics
- Tackles: 1,439
- Sacks: 21
- Forced fumbles: 12
- Fumble recoveries: 9
- Interceptions: 25
- Defensive touchdowns: 1
- Stats at Pro Football Reference

Lawyer Marzell Milloy (born November 14, 1973) is an American former professional football player who was a safety in the National Football League (NFL) for 15 seasons. He played college football for the Washington Huskies, and earned unanimous All-American honors. He was selected by the New England Patriots in the second round of the 1996 NFL draft, and also played for the Buffalo Bills, Atlanta Falcons, and Seattle Seahawks of the NFL. He was a four-time Pro Bowl selection, a two-time All-Pro, and a member of the Patriots' Super Bowl XXXVI championship team that beat his hometown team, the St. Louis Rams.

== College career ==
Milloy attended the University of Washington, where he played for the Huskies under head coach Jim Lambright from 1993 to 1995. He was the only sophomore in the Pac-10 Conference to earn all-conference honors in 1994 as he led UW and finished third in the Pac-10 with 106 tackles (67 solos); he became the first Husky defensive back to lead the team in tackles since Tony Bonwell recorded 142 tackles in 1972, and he was also had an interception, two forced fumbles and one recovered fumble. Milloy started all year at free safety as a junior, leading the team in tackles for the second consecutive season with 115, in addition to tallying three forced fumbles, one fumble recovery, and one interception. He was recognized as a unanimous All-American in 1995, having earned first-team honors from the Associated Press, the Walter Camp Foundation, UPI, the American Football Coaches Association, the Football Writers Association, and The Football News. Milloy also received first-team All-Pac-10 honors and the Jim Thorpe Award in 1995.

Milloy was drafted by the Cleveland Indians as a pitching prospect out of high school and lettered three seasons in baseball at Washington. He was later selected in the 1995 draft by the Detroit Tigers in the 19th round. In 1994, the Huskies advanced to the NCAA regional finals (Sweet 16), one round from the College World Series, but lost two straight in Wichita to Georgia Tech, led by future major leaguers Jason Varitek and Nomar Garciaparra.

== Professional career ==
Pre-draft measurables
Height	Weight	Arm length	Hand span
6 ft 0 in (1.83 m)	210 lb (95 kg)	30 1/2 in (0.77 m)	9 1/8 in (0.23 m)
All values from NFL Combine

During the pre-draft process, Milloy met with the New England Patriots' secondary coach Bill Belichick.

I didn't think he had any weak points, he was one of the most impressive guys I ever talked to. The guy hadn't watched film since his last college game back in November and he knew everything, `Here's what this call is, this is why I'm doing this. See that formation? Here are the adjustments. Now he's going in motion, we're checking this, I got him, he's got him ...' It was like he watched film yesterday. After what I saw, I thought, `This guy is smart. He's not going to have a problem handling anything.' And he liked football. He was into it. It wasn't work for him. Let's face it: He does have a little bit of an attitude. But in the end, you can certainly work with the guy.

— Bill Belichick (on Lawyer Milloy during draft)
New England Patriots' secondary coach (1996)

Milloy was projected to be a first or second round pick by NFL draft experts and scouts. He was considered to be one of the top three safety prospects available in the draft, along with Memphis safety Jerome Woods and Texas Tech safety Marcus Coleman.

=== New England Patriots ===
The New England Patriots selected Milloy in the second round (36th overall) of the 1996 NFL draft. Milloy was the second safety drafted in 1996, behind Memphis safety Jerome Woods (28th overall).

==== 1996 ====
Throughout training camp, Milloy competed to be the starting strong safety against Terry Ray. Milloy impressed the Patriots' coaching staff during the preseason and was able to make a case for the starting role. Defensive backs coach Bill Belichick lobbied for Milloy to be the starter, but head coach Bill Parcells opted to name Terry Ray the starting strong safety to begin the regular season instead.

He made his professional regular season debut in the New England Patriots' 24–10 loss at the Miami Dolphins. On September 15, 1996, Milloy recorded five combined tackles during a 31–0 win against the Arizona Cardinals in Week 3. Milloy made his first career tackle on Cardinals' wide receiver Frank Sanders in the second quarter. Milloy surpassed Terry Ray on the depth chart and earned the starting strong safety position after Week 7. On October 20, 1996, Milloy earned his first career start and recorded seven combined tackles and forced the first fumble of his career in the Patriots' 27–9 win at the Indianapolis Colts in Week 8. On November 17, 1996, Milloy collected a season-high 12 combined tackles and made his first career interception during a 34–8 loss to the Denver Broncos in Week 12. Milloy made his first career interception off a pass by Broncos' quarterback John Elway, that was originally intended for running back Terrell Davis, and returned it for a 14-yard gain in the third quarter. In Week 15, he recorded three combined tackles and made his first career sack during a 34–10 win against the New York Jets. Milloy made his first career sack on Jets' backup quarterback Glenn Foley for a seven-yard loss in the third quarter. He finished his rookie season in 1996 with 82 combined tackles, two interceptions, two forced fumbles, and a sack in 16 games and ten starts.

The New England Patriots finished first in the AFC East with an 11–5 record and earned a first-round bye. On January 5, 1997, Milloy started in his first career playoff game and made five combined tackles and an interception as the Patriots defeated the Pittsburgh Steelers 28–3 in the AFC Divisional Round. Milloy intercepted a pass by Steelers' quarterback Mike Tomczak, that was intended for wide receiver Andre Hastings, in the third quarter. The following week, he made seven combined tackles as the Patriots defeated the Jacksonville Jaguars 20–6 in the AFC Championship Game. On January 26, 1997, Milloy played in Super Bowl XXXI and recorded eight tackles during the Patriots' 35–21 loss to the Green Bay Packers.

==== 1997 ====
On February 11, 1997, it was reported that New England Patriots' head coach Bill Parcells had accepted the General Manager/Head coaching position with the New York Jets after both teams agreed to a deal. Head coach Pete Carroll named Milloy the starting strong safety to start the regular season, alongside free safety Willie Clay and cornerbacks Jimmy Hitchcock and Ty Law. On November 16, 1997, Milloy collected a season-high 12 combined tackles during a 27–7 at the Tampa Bay Buccaneers in Week 12. The following week, he tied his season-high of 12 combined tackles as the Patriots defeated the Miami Dolphins 27–24 in Week 13. He started in all 16 games in 1997 and recorded 112 combined tackles, three interceptions, and forced two fumbles.

The New England Patriots finished atop the AFC East with a 10–6 record in their first season under Carroll. On January 3, 1998, Milloy recorded ten combined tackles in the Patriots' 7–6 loss at the Pittsburgh Steelers in the AFC Divisional Round.

==== 1998 ====
Head coach Pete Carroll retained Milloy and Willie Clay as the starting safeties in 1998. On September 20, Milloy recorded nine combined tackles and returned an interception for his first career touchdown during a 27–16 win against the Tennessee Oilers in Week 3. Milloy intercepted a pass by Oilers' quarterback Steve McNair intended for Yancy Thigpen and returned it for a 30-yard touchdown to seal the Patriots' victory in the fourth quarter. In Week 16, he collected a season-high 14 combined tackles during a 24–21 win against the San Francisco 49ers. He started all 16 games in 1998 and recorded 120 combined tackles, a career-high six interceptions, a sack, and a touchdown. Milloy was selected to the 1999 Pro Bowl, the first Pro Bowl selection of his career.

==== 1999 ====
Carroll named Milloy and Chris Carter the starting safeties in 1999, alongside cornerbacks Ty Law and Steve Israel. On October 24, Milloy collected a season-high 14 combined tackles during a 24–23 win against the Denver Broncos in Week 7. Milloy started in all 16 games in 1999 and recorded 120 combined tackles, made four interceptions, and two sacks. Milloy was selected to the 2000 Pro Bowl and was widely regarded as the top safety in the league during the season.

==== 2000 ====
On January 3, 2000, the New England Patriots fired head coach Pete Carroll after the Patriots finished with an 8–8 record the previous season. On January 27, the Patriots announced former New York Jets' defensive coordinator Bill Belichick as their new head coach. The Patriots traded three draft picks to the New York Jets to hire Belichick, who was supposed to be the successor at head coach for the Jets after Bill Parcells. Belichick was Milloy's position coach as a rookie and was instrumental in the Patriots' decision to draft Milloy in 1996. Milloy was asked about Belichick by Patriots' owner Robert Kraft and stated he admired him and highly recommended Kraft hire him as the new head coach as he thought Belichick could be a great coach and could take the organization where it needed to go. Belichick also served as defensive coordinator in 2001 and hired Eric Mangini to be the defensive backs coach.

On February 10, 2000, the New England Patriots signed Milloy to a seven-year, $35 million contract that included a signing bonus of $6 million. His contract made him the highest paid safety in the league. Belichick named Milloy the starting strong safety to start the season, alongside free safety Tebucky Jones. On November 19, Milloy collected a season-high 13 combined tackles, forced a fumble, and also made an interception during the Patriots' 16–13 win against the Cincinnati Bengals in Week 12. Milloy intercepted a pass by Bengals' quarterback Scott Mitchell intended for tight end Tony McGee and was quickly tackled by offensive tackle Willie Anderson. Milloy started all 16 games in 2000 and made a total of 117 combined tackles, three forced fumbles, and two interceptions.

==== 2001 ====
The New England Patriots hired former Cleveland Browns' defensive coordinator Romeo Crennel as their defensive coordinator in 2001. Crennel opted to retain Milloy and Tebucky Jones as the starting safeties. Milloy and Jones started alongside cornerbacks Ty Law and Otis Smith in 2001.

In Week 6, he collected a season-high ten combined tackles (nine solo) during a 38–17 victory at the Indianapolis Colts. On November 25, 2001, Milloy tied a season-high of ten combined tackles (five solo), deflected a pass, and intercepted a pass by Saints' quarterback Aaron Brooks as the Patriots defeated the New Orleans Saints 34–17 in Week 11. In Week 14, he recorded a game-high eight combined tackles, broke up a pass, and made an interception off a pass by Bills' quarterback Alex Van Pelt during a 12–9 overtime victory at Buffalo Bills. Milloy was selected to play in the 2002 Pro Bowl, which became his third Pro Bowl selection. Milloy started in all 16 games in 2001 and recorded 113 combined tackles (77 solo), three sacks, three pass deflections, and two interceptions.

The New England Patriots finished atop the AFC East with an 11–5 record and earned a first round bye. Milloy recorded five combined tackles as the Patriots began their playoff run by defeating the Oakland Raiders 16–13 in the AFC Divisional Round. On January 27, 2002, Milloy recorded three solo tackles, deflected a pass and made an interception during a 24–17 win at the Pittsburgh Steelers in the AFC Championship Game. Milloy intercepted a pass by Steelers' quarterback Kordell Stewart, that was originally intended for wide receiver Plaxico Burress, and sealed the Patriots' victory in the fourth quarter. On February 3, 2002, Milloy started in Super Bowl XXXVI and recorded seven combined tackles and led the team with three pass deflections as the Patriots defeated the St. Louis Rams 20–17. Milloy earned his first and only Super Bowl ring of his career.

==== 2002 and release ====
Head coach Belichick retained the starting secondary in 2002. On December 16, Milloy collected a season-high 11 combined tackles (nine solo) during a 24–7 loss at the Tennessee Titans in Week 15. He started all 16 games in 2002 and recorded 94 combined tackles (65 solo) and five pass deflections. He was selected in the 2003 Pro Bowl, his fourth and final Pro Bowl.

Today is a day that nobody is happy about. This isn't the way we wanted this story to end. This is the hardest player that I have had to release. It was the hardest situation that I've had to go through like this, here or anywhere else.

— Bill Belichick (on Lawyer Milloy's release)
New England Patriots' head coach

On September 2, 2003, the New England Patriots released Milloy after he declined to take a pay cut to remain with the team. The Patriots cleared $5.86 million in cap space for 2003 with his release. Milloy was supposed to earn $4.5 million in 2003 and still had four years remaining on his contract. Milloy was not scheduled to become an unrestricted free agent until after the 2006 season.

=== Buffalo Bills ===
On September 3, 2003, the Buffalo Bills signed Milloy to a four-year, $15 million contract that included a signing bonus of $5 million. Head coach Gregg Williams named Milloy the starting strong safety to start the regular season, alongside starting free safety Izell Reese and cornerbacks Nate Clements and Antoine Winfield.

Milloy's first game with Buffalo took place five days after his release against his former team, the New England Patriots. He finished the Bills' 31–0 victory with five combined tackles and sacked quarterback Tom Brady. On December 14, Milloy collected a season-high 14 combined tackles (12 solo) during a 28–26 loss at the Tennessee Titans in Week 15. On December 30, Buffalo Bills fired Williams after a 6–10 season. Milloy started all 16 games in 2003 NFL season and recorded 104 combined tackles (69 solo), eight pass deflections, three sacks, and two forced fumbles. Milloy also extended his consecutive starts streak to 122 games.

==== 2004 ====
Head coach Mike Mularkey named Milloy the starting strong safety to begin the season, alongside free safety Izell Reese and cornerbacks Terrence McGee and Nate Clements. On August 28, Milloy broke his forearm during a 30–17 loss at the Indianapolis Colts in their third preseason game. Milloy was inactive for Buffalo' first five games (Weeks 1–6) due to his injury. On November 14, he collected a season-high 15 combined tackles (ten solo) during a 29–6 loss at the New England Patriots in Week 10. The following week, Milloy recorded six solo tackles and made a career-high three sacks on St. Louis Rams' quarterback Marc Bulger during the Bills' 37–17 win in Week 11. He started all 11 games he was active and recorded 61 combined tackles (39 solo), five pass deflections, four sacks, and two interceptions.

==== 2005 and release ====
Head coach Mike Mularkey retained Milloy as the starting strong safety in 2005. He started alongside free safety Troy Vincent and cornerbacks Nate Clements and Terrence McGee. In Week 10, he collected a season-high 12 combined tackles (nine solo) during the Bills' 14–3 win against the Kansas City Chiefs. Milloy started all 16 games in 2005 and recorded 106 combined tackles (75 solo), four pass deflections, a sack, and an interception.

On March 1, 2006, Buffalo released Milloy and defensive tackle Sam Adams in a salary cap purge that freed up an estimated $9.1 million in cap space. Milloy was set to account for $3.75 million in salary cap space in 2006. Milloy visited the Cincinnati Bengals, Seattle Seahawks, and Atlanta Falcons during free agency.

=== Atlanta Falcons ===
On March 17, 2006, the Atlanta Falcons signed Milloy to a three-year, $6.01 million contract that included a signing bonus of $2.50 million. Head coach Jim Mora named Milloy the starting strong safety to start the regular season, alongside free safety Chris Crocker and cornerbacks DeAngelo Hall and Jimmy Williams.

On October 15, Milloy collected a season-high 11 combined tackles (nine solo) during a 27–14 loss to the New York Giants in Week 6. He started all 16 games in 2006 and recorded 98 combined tackles (72 solo), five pass deflections, and two sacks.

On January 2, 2007, the Falcons fired Mora after the Falcons did not qualify for the playoffs and finished with a 7–9 record in 2006.

==== 2007 ====
Head coach Bobby Petrino retained Milloy and Chris Crocker as the starting safety duo in 2007. They started in the secondary alongside cornerbacks DeAngelo Hall and Chris Houston.

In Week 6, Milloy collected a season-high 11 solo tackles in the Falcons' 31–10 win against the New York Giants. On December 16, 2007, Milloy recorded a season-high 12 combined tackles (11 solo) during a 37–3 loss at the Tampa Bay Buccaneers in Week 15. On December 11, Petrino resigned as head coach and accepted the head coaching position with the University of Arkansas. Falcons' quarterback Michael Vick was sentenced to 23-months in prison on the same day for running a dogfighting operation. Milloy started all 16 games in 2007 and recorded 90 combined tackles (76 solo), five pass deflections, and two interceptions.

==== 2008 ====
On January 23, 2008, Atlanta hired Jacksonville Jaguars' defensive coordinator Mike Smith as their new head coach. Smith named Milloy the starting strong safety to start the regular season, alongside free safety Erik Coleman and cornerbacks Brent Grimes and Chris Houston. On December 14, Milloy collected a season-high 12 combined tackles (nine solo) during a 13–10 win against the Tampa Bay Buccaneers in Week 15. He finished the 2008 season with 93 combined tackles (76 solo), five pass deflections, a forced fumble, and an interception in 15 games and 15 starts.

The Falcons finished second in the NFC South with an 11–5 record. On January 3, 2009, Milloy recorded five combined tackles during a 30–24 loss at the Arizona Cardinals in the NFC Wildcard Game.

=== Seattle Seahawks ===
==== 2009 ====
On September 6, 2009, the Seattle Seahawks signed Milloy to a one-year, $845,000 contract. Head coach Jim Mora named Milloy the backup free safety, behind Jordan Babineaux, to start the regular season. On December 27, Milloy collected a season-high six combined tackles in the Seahawks' 48–10 loss at the Green Bay Packers in Week 16. Milloy finished the 2009 season with 34 combined tackles (27 solo) and two pass deflections in 16 games and one start.

==== 2010 ====
On April 30, 2010, the Seahawks signed Milloy to another one-year, $845,000 contract. Head coach Pete Carroll named Milloy the starting strong safety to begin the regular season in 2010, alongside free safety Earl Thomas and cornerbacks Marcus Trufant and Kelly Jennings. In Week 3, he collected a season-high 12 combined tackles (seven solo) during a 27–20 win against the San Diego Chargers. On October 17, Milloy recorded three solo tackles and a season-high two sacks during the Seahawks' 29–20 win at the Chicago Bears in Week 6. His two sacks against the Bears earned him a spot in the 20/20 club. Milloy started in all 16 games in 2010 and recorded 88 combined tackles (67 solo), four sacks, three pass deflections, and a forced fumble.

The Seahawks finished first in the NFC West with a 7–9 record and earned home-field advantage in the wild-card round of the playoffs. The Seahawks upset the favored New Orleans Saints 41–36 in the NFC Wildcard Game. On January 16, 2011, Milloy recorded seven solo tackles as the Seahawks were defeated 35–24 at the Chicago Bears in the NFC Divisional Round. Despite interest in returning, Milloy was not re-signed by the Seahawks for the 2011 season, due to the emergence of 2010 draft picks Earl Thomas and Kam Chancellor.

== NFL career statistics ==
Legend
	Won the Super Bowl
**Bold**	Career high

=== Regular season ===
Year	Team	Games		Tackles				Fumbles			Interceptions					
Year	Team	GP	GS	Cmb	Solo	Ast	Sck	FF	FR	Yds	Int	Yds	Avg	Lng	TD	PD
1996	NE	16	10	84	52	30	1.0	2	1	0	2	14	7.0	14	0	7
1997	NE	16	16	112	80	31	0.0	2	2	0	3	15	5.0	15	0	11
1998	NE	16	16	120	79	41	1.0	0	1	0	6	54	9.0	30	1	11
1999	NE	16	16	120	91	29	2.0	0	2	0	4	17	3.2	17	0	6
2000	NE	16	16	121	86	31	0.0	3	0	0	2	2	1.0	2	0	6
2001	NE	16	16	113	77	36	3.0	0	1	0	2	21	10.5	21	0	3
2002	NE	16	16	94	65	29	0.0	0	0	0	0	0	0.0	0	0	5
2003	BUF	16	16	104	69	35	3.0	2	1	0	0	0	0.0	0	0	8
2004	BUF	11	11	61	39	22	4.0	0	0	0	2	20	10.0	11	0	5
2005	BUF	16	16	106	75	31	1.0	0	1	0	1	0	0.0	0	0	4
2006	ATL	16	16	98	72	26	2.0	0	0	0	0	0	0.0	0	0	5
2007	ATL	16	16	90	76	14	0.0	0	0	0	2	24	12.0	19	0	5
2008	ATL	15	15	93	76	17	0.0	1	0	0	1	38	38.0	38	0	5
2009	SEA	16	1	34	27	7	0.0	0	0	0	0	0	0.0	0	0	2
2010	SEA	16	16	88	61	27	4.0	1	0	0	0	0	0.0	0	0	3
Career		234	213	1,431	1,025	406	21.0	11	9	0	25	205	8.2	38	1	86

== Personal life ==
Milloy was born in St. Louis, Missouri. He was raised by his parents Mae Blakeny and Larry Milloy. His mother was 15 at the time of his birth and his father was a senior in high school. Larry Milloy served in the Army for six years. Milloy has a younger brother named Galvin and grew up in Tacoma, Washington. Both his parents struggled with drug addiction during his childhood, and his father was arrested for conspiracy to receive a controlled substance and was incarcerated for 2 1/2 years when Lawyer was 15. Larry Milloy was arrested after signing for a large package of narcotics that came in the mail and was immediately arrested by police. Milloy moved in with his best friend during high school after a court hearing declared his mother an unfit parent and made Lawyer a ward of the state. His younger brother moved to St. Louis with their grandmother. His mother's drug use worsened, and she moved to Trenton, New Jersey and worked as a janitor. During his senior year of high school, his family was reunited after his father was released from prison. His parents changed their lives and credit Lawyer for inspiring them.

Milloy attended Lincoln High School in Tacoma, Washington, and excelled in high school football, baseball, and basketball. He was a teammate of Jon Kitna at Lincoln High School and earned Parade magazine high school All-American honors his senior year after rushing for 1,056 yards and 15 touchdowns as a tailback and intercepting seven passes as a safety. He was also a three-time All-Narrows League choice and was considered the top prep prospect in the state his senior year.

On September 15, 2008, it was reported that Milloy was arrested by Gwinnett Police for speeding and DUI. Police pulled him over for speeding on Interstate 85 at 3:30 am, and he was deemed intoxicated and was lodged in Gwinnett County Jail before posting a $1,645 bond.

Milloy married his college girlfriend, Claudine, a two-time All-American for Washington in track. They currently reside in Woodinville, Washington and have four daughters, Amirah, Kiki, Tia, and Breya. Amirah was an outfielder for the Washington Huskies softball team. Kiki was a center fielder for the Tennessee Volunteers softball team. Tia began playing for the University of Oklahoma softball team in 2025.
