= Damon Denson =

American football player (born 1975)

No. 51, 61
- Position: Guard

Personal information
- Born: February 8, 1975 (age 51); Aliquippa, Pennsylvania, U.S.
- Listed height: 6 ft 4 in (1.93 m)
- Listed weight: 305 lb (138 kg)

Career information
- High school: Baldwin (PA)
- College: Michigan
- NFL draft: 1997: 4th round, 97th overall pick

Career history
- New England Patriots (1997–1999); Baltimore Ravens (2000)*
- * Offseason or practice squad member only

Awards and highlights
- First-team All-Big Ten (1996)

Career NFL statistics
- Games played: 14
- Games started: 4
- Stats at Pro Football Reference

Damon Michael Denson (born February 8, 1975) is an American former professional football player. He played college football as a defensive tackle and offensive guard for the University of Michigan from 1993 to 1996. He played as an offensive guard in the National Football League (NFL) for the New England Patriots from 1997 to 1999.

== Early life ==
Denson was born in Aliquippa, Pennsylvania, in 1975. A few years after his birth, his parents moved from Aliquippa to Baldwin, Pennsylvania, a suburb of Pittsburgh. He attended Baldwin High School where he played for the legendary WPIAL Hall of Fame coach Don Yannessa. Denson became only the second player in Baldwin High School history to start on the varsity football team as a true freshman. While playing in the highly competitive WPIAL, Denson had to face the likes of future Pro Football Hall of Fame player Jason Taylor and future Super Bowl Champion Mike Logan who would eventually become his 1997 Draft classmates. In his junior year, the Fighting Highlanders beat North Hills High School to win their first playoff game in over three decades. During his senior year, Denson was selected as a USA Today High School All-American and chosen to play in the prestigious Big 33 Pennsylvania Football High School All Star Game playing alongside Jon Ritchie and Ron Powlus.

== University of Michigan ==
Damon Denson Michigan vs Colorado 1996

Denson enrolled at the University of Michigan in 1993 and played college football for the Michigan Wolverines football teams from 1993 to 1996. He started his career as a defensive tackle, starting four games at that position as a true freshman in 1993 and one game in 1994 playing alongside Ty Law and Trevor Pryce.

As a junior, Denson was converted to an offensive guard. He started one game at the position in 1995 and all 12 games in 1996. Along with Jon Runyan, Jon Jansen and Rod Payne, Denson helped Tim Biakabutuka rush for 1,818 yards, still Michigan's single-season rushing record, in 1995. Denson was named a first-team guard on the 1996 All-Big Ten Conference football team while blocking for Brian Griese and Heisman trophy winner Charles Woodson.

== Professional football ==
Damon Denson Offensive Guard #61

Denson was selected by the New England Patriots in the fourth round (97th overall pick) of the 1997 NFL draft. He played for the Patriots under coach Pete Carroll from 1997 to 1999. He appeared in 16 games for the Patriots in 1998, four of them as a starter at offensive guard.

== Legacy ==
For Thanksgiving 2015 Denson and his family were featured in an NFL Football Dads Football Is Family commercial where he discusses how the game of football has brought his family closer together and what it means to share the sport with his children.

== Faith and personal life ==
Damon Denson at 2011 Super Bowl Gospel Celebration in Dallas, TX.

Denson was converted to Christianity during his freshman year at Michigan. He joined a local church where he was ordained as a minister and began teaching bible study on campus. After being drafted by the New England Patriots, he continued to minister as an evangelist at a local Boston church. He has worked as a minister in churches and prisons as well as performing chaplain duties for professional sports teams and speaking at the prestigious NFL sanctioned Super Bowl Gospel Celebration.

Denson started his own ministry.

Denson and his wife, Camille, have two children.
