= J. R. Conrad =

American football player (born 1974)

No. 64, 70
- Position: Offensive lineman

Personal information
- Born: February 2, 1974 (age 52); Miami, Oklahoma, U.S.
- Listed height: 6 ft 4 in (1.93 m)
- Listed weight: 300 lb (136 kg)

Career information
- High school: Fairland (Fairland, Oklahoma)
- College: Oklahoma
- NFL draft: 1996: 7th round, 247th overall pick

Career history

Playing
- New England Patriots (1996-1997)*; New York Jets (1997); Dallas Cowboys (2000)*
- * Offseason or practice squad member only

Coaching
- Crooked Oak High School (2001–2003) Assistant coach; Tuttle High School (2004) Assistant coach; Oklahoma City Yard Dawgz (2005–2008) Offensive and defensive lines coach; Dibble High School (2009–2010) Assistant coach; Dibble High School (2011–2013) Head coach

Career NFL statistics
- Games played: 12
- Games started: 1
- Stats at Pro Football Reference

James Robert Conrad (born February 2, 1974) is an American former professional football player who was an offensive lineman for the New England Patriots, New York Jets, and Dallas Cowboys of the National Football League (NFL). He played college football for the Oklahoma Sooners.

After his NFL career, Conrad coached both high school football and arena football, most notably with the Oklahoma City Yard Dawgz.

== Early life ==
Conrad was born on February 2, 1974, in Miami, Oklahoma, to Priscilla Conrad. He was named after two of his uncles.

Conrad is a member of the Eastern Shawnee Tribe of Oklahoma and grew up in Indian housing in Miami. With neither of his parents present in his early life, he was raised by his maternal grandmother. After his grandmother was placed in a nursing home due to Parkinson's disease, Conrad lived with his uncle, a Marine who had served in the Vietnam War.

During Conrad's sophomore year of high school, he moved in with his mother in Fairland, Oklahoma. He attended the small Fairland High School and participated in football, basketball, weightlifting, and track at the school. On the football team, he played on the offensive and defensive lines as well as playing kicker. He was an all-state player and Gatorade Player of the Year for both Oklahoma and the Southwest United States. He graduated high school in 1992 with a senior class of just 18 students.

Conrad was recruited to play for the Missouri Tigers by coach Andy Reid, but ultimately chose to attend the University of Oklahoma to play for the Oklahoma Sooners, due to his respect for Oklahoma assistant coach Merv Johnson.

== College career ==
=== 1992 season ===
When Conrad arrived at Oklahoma in 1992, both of the school's centers were struggling with injuries, and the team needed someone else to start at the position. Conrad, who had never played or even practiced playing center before, was asked by coaches Merv Johnson and Gary Gibbs to be the starting center, in spite of other coaches' policies against having freshmen as starters on the offensive line. "I thought it was a joke at first," Conrad said of the change, but he made the adjustment quickly and successfully with only two fumbled snaps all season. This made him the first true freshman to ever start at center in Oklahoma Sooners history.

Conrad started every game of the 1992 season and earned freshman All-American honors.

=== 1993 season ===
Conrad played in every game in 1993, starting four at left tackle and one at center. He also started at left tackle in the 1993 John Hancock Bowl, as the Sun Bowl was known at that time.

=== 1994 season ===
Conrad was moved to right tackle in 1994 and started every game at the position. Listed at 6 feet 5 inches and 311 pounds that season, he was a key contributor to an offensive line that was ranked one of the best in the country and made way for a strong rushing attack by running backs James "Lightning" Allen and Jerald "Thunder" Moore.

Head coach Gary Gibbs announced he was stepping down from his position just before the Sooners' final regular season game, a matchup against No. 1 ranked Nebraska on November 25, 1994. Conrad was among the Oklahoma players who believed Gibbs had been unfairly criticized for factors out of his control, and that he had done his best to elevate the team from the troublesome state it had previously been in. The Sooners ultimately lost the Nebraska game, 13–3.

Conrad also started at right tackle in the 1994 Copper Bowl against Brigham Young University, which the Sooners lost by a score of 31–6.

=== 1995 season ===
Following the departure of coach Gibbs, Oklahoma hired Howard Schnellenberger as head coach. Schnellenberger, who only lasted a year at Oklahoma, was markedly different from Gibbs, and had Conrad lose 50 pounds prior to the 1995 season, bringing him down to about 275 pounds.

Conrad suffered a shoulder injury early in the 1995 season, and team doctors suggested that he undergo surgery and redshirt for the remainder of the year. He opted instead to rehabilitate it and missed two weeks of the season, but was able to start the final nine games that season at right tackle. Over his four-year college football career, Conrad had a total of 46 starts.

On December 25, 1995, Conrad participated in the annual Blue-Gray Game as a member of the Blue (northern) team, which won by a score of 26–7.

== Professional football career ==
=== New England Patriots ===
Conrad was selected by the New England Patriots in the seventh round of the 1996 NFL draft. The team waived him on August 25, but re-signed him to the practice squad two days later on August 27. He spent the whole 1996 season on the practice squad, playing tackle and guard. That season, the Patriots made it to Super Bowl XXXI, though they lost to the Green Bay Packers.

Conrad was waived by the Patriots on August 25, 1997.

=== New York Jets ===
On September 22, 1997, Conrad signed with the New York Jets as a free agent. This was his second year playing under coach Bill Parcells, as the two had both been with the New England Patriots in the previous season. The Jets moved Conrad back to center, which he had not played since his freshman year at Oklahoma.

Following a knee injury to Jets starting center Roger Duffy, Conrad was told he would start the team's Week 7 game against the Miami Dolphins. However, the Jets failed to report Duffy as injured to the league, resulting in a violation of the injury policy when Conrad started in his place. The game went awkwardly for Conrad, and the Jets lost by a score of 31–20. Duffy returned as the starter for the following week's game against the New England Patriots. Conrad finished the 1997 season having only made one start, and saw action in twelve games.

Conrad suffered a back injury during offseason training before the Jets' 1998 season. He was waived by the Jets on August 22, 1998.

=== Time off from football (1998–2000) ===
After his injury, Conrad had to return to Oklahoma and had back surgery in 1999. He took some time off from playing football following the injury and believed his NFL career was likely over. He returned to the University of Oklahoma to finish the remaining nine credit hours of his degree in social studies.

He was selected by the Barcelona Dragons in the 14th round of the 1999 NFL Europe draft, but never signed with the team.

While watching an Oklahoma high school all-state game, Conrad suddenly received a call from the Dallas Cowboys, inviting him to come to training camp. He initially did not believe it was a legitimate request for him to actually play with the team, as he had not been involved in football in about two years and had put on some weight, now weighing in at about 330 pounds.

=== Dallas Cowboys ===
After checking with his wife first, Conrad accepted the Cowboys' offer to let him come to training camp. He signed with the Cowboys on August 1, 2000, but was cut by the team only twenty days later on August 21. Despite being cut by the team, the opportunity to play with NFL greats like Larry Allen turned Conrad's opinions on the world back around. "I'm no longer mad at God, I'm no longer mad at football," he said in a 2022 interview, in reference to his feelings at the time.

== Coaching career ==
=== Crooked Oak High School ===
In 2001, Conrad became an assistant coach at Crooked Oak High School in Oklahoma City. He coached there through the 2003 season.

=== Tuttle High School ===
In 2004, Conrad served as an assistant coach at Tuttle High School in Tuttle, Oklahoma.

=== Oklahoma City Yard Dawgz ===
In January 2005, Conrad became the offensive and defensive lines coach for the Oklahoma City Yard Dawgz, a developmental arena football team that was coming off a successful debut season. In 2005, the team attained the same 10–6 record as the previous year before suffering a first-round playoff exit.

In 2006 and 2007, the Dawgz continued to be successful. They made two more playoff appearances, despite having a losing record in 2007 amid a season-ending injury to safety Jon Holland, described as the "cornerstone of [their] defense."

The 2008 season did not go as well for the Yard Dawgz, who got off to a 1–5 start and finished 6–10, marking the only time the team missed the playoffs. Following this season, Conrad returned to coaching high school football.

=== Dibble High School ===
In 2009, Conrad became an assistant coach at Dibble High School in Dibble, Oklahoma. He became head coach in 2011 but stepped down in April 2014, citing a desire to focus on his own children's athletic development.

=== Trench Mafia ===
After watching an offensive line coach whose yelling only demoralized players, Conrad was inspired to start his own offensive line training academy. The academy is now called Trench Mafia and is offered at no cost but is invite-only. The program has turned out players such as Kansas City Chiefs offensive lineman Creed Humphrey, Georgia Bulldogs offensive lineman Owen Condon, and Nebraska Cornhuskers offensive lineman Hunter Anthony.

== Personal life ==
Conrad married Keisha Conrad in June 1997. The couple live in Mustang, Oklahoma, outside of Oklahoma City. They have four children: Hayden, Hudson, Henley, and Holden. Hayden is a quarterback for the Evangel Valor college football program.

He was inducted into the North American Indigenous Athletics Hall of Fame in 2022.
