= Ty Law =

American football player (born 1974)

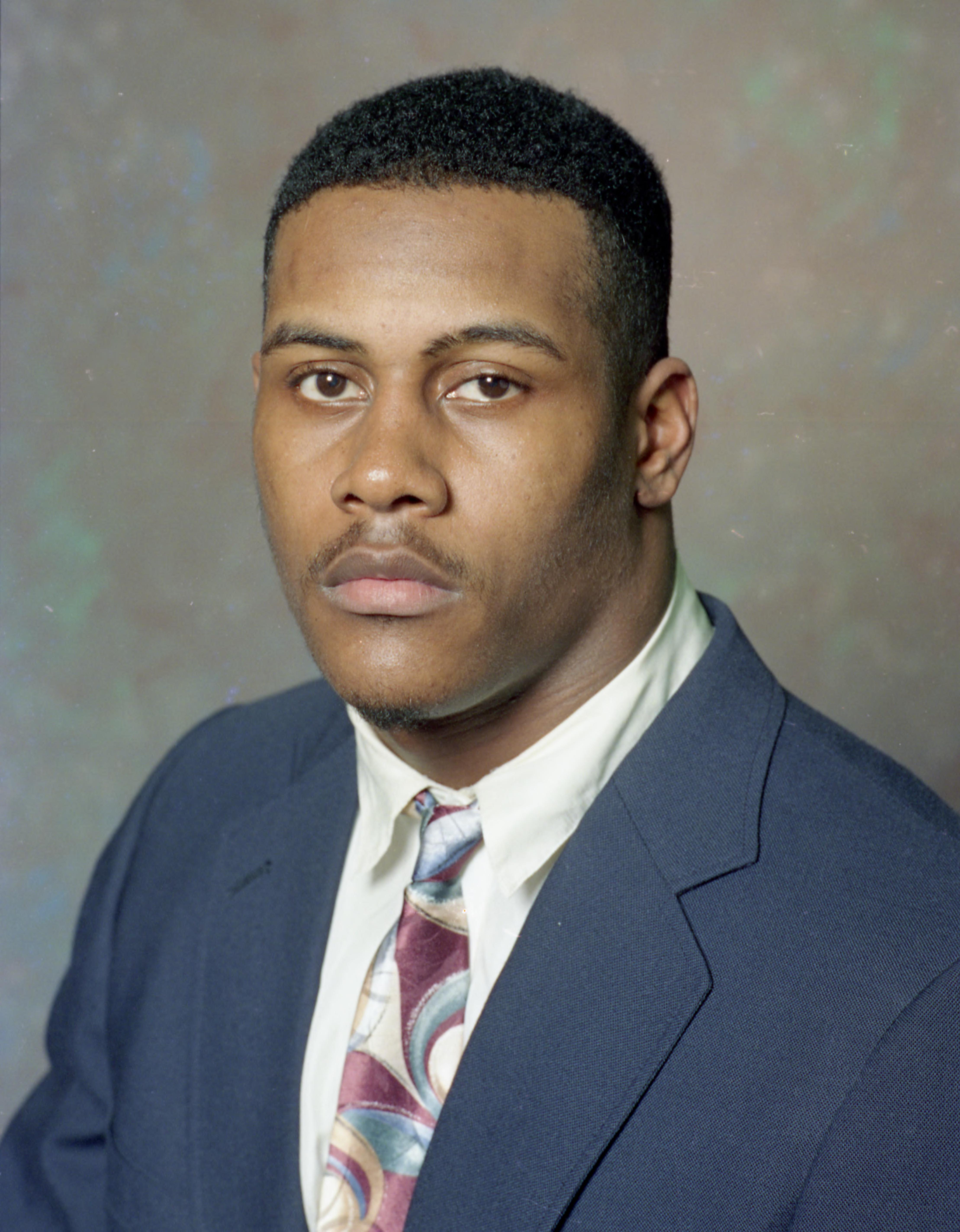
- Law in 1994

No. 24, 22, 26
- Position: Cornerback

Personal information
- Born: February 10, 1974 (age 52); Aliquippa, Pennsylvania, U.S.
- Listed height: 5 ft 11 in (1.80 m)
- Listed weight: 200 lb (91 kg)

Career information
- High school: Aliquippa
- College: Michigan (1992–1994)
- NFL draft: 1995: 1st round, 23rd overall pick

Career history
- New England Patriots (1995–2004); New York Jets (2005); Kansas City Chiefs (2006–2007); New York Jets (2008); Denver Broncos (2009)

Awards and highlights
- 3× Super Bowl champion (XXXVI, XXXVIII, XXXIX); 2× First-team All-Pro (1998, 2003); 5× Pro Bowl (1998, 2001–2003, 2005); 2× NFL interceptions leader (1998, 2005); NFL 2000s All-Decade Team; New England Patriots All-1990s Team; New England Patriots All-2000s Team; New England Patriots 50th Anniversary Team; New England Patriots All-Dynasty Team; New England Patriots Hall of Fame; First-team All-American (1994); 2× First-team All-Big Ten (1993, 1994)

Career NFL statistics
- Total tackles: 845
- Forced fumbles: 7
- Fumble recoveries: 5
- Passes defended: 108
- Interceptions: 53
- Defensive touchdowns: 7
- Stats at Pro Football Reference
- Pro Football Hall of Fame

Tajuan Edward "Ty" Law (born February 10, 1974) is an American former professional football cornerback who played in the National Football League (NFL) for 15 seasons, primarily with the New England Patriots. He played college football for the Michigan Wolverines, earning first-team All-American honors, and was selected by the Patriots in the first round of the 1995 NFL draft.

During his 10 seasons in New England, Law received four Pro Bowl selections and two first-team All-Pro honors. A three-time Super Bowl winner with the Patriots, he also holds the franchise record for interceptions. Law spent his final five seasons as a member of the New York Jets, Kansas City Chiefs, and Denver Broncos, earning a fifth Pro Bowl selection with the Jets. Ranking 24th in NFL career interceptions, he twice led the league in interceptions during the 1998 and 2005 seasons. He was inducted to the Pro Football Hall of Fame in 2019.

== Early life ==
Law attended Aliquippa High School in Aliquippa, in Beaver County, Pennsylvania, where he played football and basketball, and ran track. He played in football as a cornerback, safety, wide receiver, and running back. He was named MVP of the school's basketball team. In 1991, he led Aliquippa to victory in the Pennsylvania Interscholastic Athletic Association A-level high school football championship.

Tony Dorsett, a Hall of Fame running back, is Law's uncle. Law spent summers in Dallas with Dorsett while he was growing up.

== College career ==
Law had a three-year stint at the University of Michigan, where he lettered three years in a row (1992–94), earned first-team All-American honors from the Walter Camp Football Foundation as a junior, and was a two-time unanimous All-Big Ten Conference selection. He was on the cover of the October 3, 1994, issue of Sports Illustrated, though it was an ignominious honor; he is the defender over whom Colorado Buffaloes receiver Michael Westbrook is leaping on the famous Miracle at Michigan play. Following his junior year, he left Michigan to enter the 1995 NFL Draft due to financial hardship after his grandfather declared bankruptcy.

He finished his college career with 154 tackles [120 solo, 34 assist], six interceptions, and 17 passes defended.

== Professional career ==
=== Pre-draft ===
Pre-draft measurables
Height	Weight	Arm length	Hand span	Bench press
5 ft 11 1/4 in (1.81 m)	196 lb (89 kg)	30 5/8 in (0.78 m)	9 1/4 in (0.23 m)	21 reps
All values from NFL Combine

As a junior, Law wrote of a letter to the NFL Draft Advisory Board of his interest in declaring for the 1995 NFL Draft and was told in their reply letter they projected him to be selected anywhere from the fourth to seventh round. He attended a pre-draft visit with the New England Patriots. The Patriots would have Law as their highest graded defensive back on their draft board, ahead of Bobby Taylor, who was graded ahead of Law by the majority of draft experts.

=== New England Patriots ===
==== 1995 ====
The New England Patriots selected Law in the first round (23rd overall) of the 1995 NFL draft. He was the second cornerback selected, following Tyrone Poole (22nd overall), and was the second of three Michigan players selected in the first round of the 1995 NFL Draft, along with Tyrone Wheatley (17th overall) and Trezelle Jenkins (31st overall).

"We feel he’ll be able to come in here and contribute in his first season. He’s got decent speed, he’s got good size, he can tackle, and he’s a good, solid young man.”

— Bill Parcells (Patriots' Head Coach)

On July 20, 1995, the New England Patriots signed Law to a five-year, $5.50 million contract. Throughout training camp, Law competed against Maurice Hurst for the role as the No. 2 starting cornerback. Head coach Bill Parcells named Law a backup and listed him as the third cornerback on the depth chart to begin the season, behind starters Ricky Reynolds and Maurice Hurst.

On September 3, 1995, Law made his professional regular-season debut in the New England Patriots’ season-opener against the Cleveland Browns, ironically against Bill Belichick, and recorded two solo tackles in their 17–14 victory. On October 1, 1995, Law earned his first career start, appearing as a dimeback, and recorded four combined tackles (three solo) and set a season-high with two pass deflections during a 30–17 loss at the Atlanta Falcons. He missed two games (Weeks 8–9) due a hip flexor injury. On November 20, 1995, the Patriots cut starting cornerback Maurice Hurst after a poor performance in a 10–24 loss to the Indianapolis Colts, during which Hurst gave up two 40-yard passes from Jim Harbaugh to wide receiver Sean Dawkins. Head coach Bill Parcells subsequently named Law his replacement at starting cornerback for the last five games (Weeks 13–17) of the season. On November 26, 1995, Law earned his first start as a starting cornerback and had six combined tackles (four solo), one pass deflection, and had his first career interception on a pass thrown by Jim Kelly to wide receiver Justin Armour during a 35–25 victory at the Buffalo Bills. The following week, Law made three combined tackles (two solo), a pass break-up, and intercepted a pass by Jim Everett to wide receiver Quinn Early and returned it for a season-long 38 yards as the Patriots lost 31–17 to the New Orleans Saints in Week 14. In Week 15, he set a season-high with eight combined tackles (six solo), made one pass deflection, and intercepted a pass attempt by Jets’ quarterback Boomer Esiason during a 31–28 win against the New York Jets. He made an interception in three consecutive games since taking over the starting role. On December 23, 1995, Law set a season-high with eight solo tackles and made his first career sack on Jim Harbaugh for a six–yard loss during the first quarter of a 10–7 loss at the Indianapolis Colts. He finished his rookie season in 1995 with 47 combined tackles (40 solo), nine pass deflections, three interceptions, and one sack in 14 games and seven starts.

==== 1996 ====
On February 16, 1996, the New England Patriots hired recently fired Cleveland Browns' head coach Bill Belichick to reunited with Bill Parcells as an assistant head coach and the secondary coach. Defensive coordinator Al Groh named Law and Ricky Reynolds as starting cornerbacks to begin the season, following the departure of Maurice Hurst.

On October 20, 1996, Law set a season-high with 12 combined tackles (10 solo) and made two pass deflections during a 27–9 victory at the Indianapolis Colts. He was inactive for three games (Weeks 11–13) due to a knee injury. In Week 15, he made one tackle, a pass deflection, and scored the first touchdown of his career after intercepting a pass thrown by Glenn Foley to wide receiver Keyshawn Johnson and returning it 38–yards for a touchdown in the third quarter as the Patriots defeated the New York Jets 34–10. On December 15, 1996, Law recorded seven solo tackles, set a season-high with three pass deflections, and also set a season-high with two interceptions on passes by Troy Aikman during a 12–6 loss at the Dallas Cowboys. He finished his sophomore season with 62 combined tackles (56 solo), nine pass deflections, three interceptions, and one touchdown in 13 games and 12 starts.

The New England Patriots finished the 1996 NFL season first in the AFC East with an 11–5 record, to clinch a playoff berth and a first-round bye. On January 5, 1997, Law started in the first playoff game of his career and made three combined tackles (two solo) and a pass break-up as the Patriots defeated the Pittsburgh Steelers 28–3 in the AFC Divisional Round. In the AFC Championship Game, Law had four combined tackles (three solo) during a 20-6 win against the Jacksonville Jaguars to advance to the first Super Bowl of his career. On January 26, 1997, Law started in Super Bowl XXXI and made three combined tackles (two solo) during a 35–21 loss against the Green Bay Packers.

==== 1997 ====
On January 31, 1997, New England Patriots' head coach Bill Parcells announced his resignation five days after losing in Super Bowl XXXI to accept the position as head coach for the rival New York Jets. His staff including Al Groh, Bill Belichick, and Romeo Crennel accompanied Parcells. On February 3, 1997, the New England Patriots hired San Francisco 49ers’ defensive coordinator Pete Carroll to be their new head coach. The Patriots selected Chris Canty in the first round (29th overall) of the 1997 NFL draft following the departure of Ricky Reynolds. Throughout training camp, the Patriots held a competition to name the No. 2 starting cornerback alongside Law, in between Steve Israel, Chris Canty, and Jimmy Hitchcock. He was named a starting cornerback to begin the season and was paired with Jimmy Hitchcock.

On October 12, 1997, Law recorded four solo tackles, set a season-high with three pass deflections, and intercepted a pass by Billy Joe Hobert to wide receiver Andre Reed before fumbling it out-of-bounds as the Patriots defeated the Buffalo Bills 6–33. On December 7, 1997, Law set a season-high with nine solo tackles during a 26–20 victory at the Jacksonville Jaguars. He started in all 16 games throughout the 1997 NFL season for the first time in his career and made 77 combined tackles (69 solo), 11 pass deflections, and three interceptions, and was credited with half a sack.

==== 1998 ====
The New England Patriots selected cornerback Tebucky Jones in the first round (23rd overall) of the 1998 NFL draft. Defensive coordinator Steve Sidwell retained Law as the No. 1 starting cornerback and paired him with Chris Canty to begin the season following the departure of Jimmy Hitchcock.

On September 13, 1998, Law recorded two solo tackles, made three pass deflections, intercepted two passes, and scored a touchdown on an interception by rookie Peyton Manning on a pass to tight end Marcus Pollard and returned it for a 59–yard touchdown during a 29–6 win against the Indianapolis Colts. The following week, he recorded six combined tackles (four solo), made two pass deflections, and sealed a 16–27 win against the Tennessee Oilers by intercepting a pass by Steve McNair to wide receiver Yancey Thigpen with 1:40 remaining in Week 3. On October 4, 1998, Law made four solo tackles, three pass deflections, and intercepted a pass by Danny Wuerffel to wide receiver Sean Dawkins during a 30–27 victory at the New Orleans Saints. It marked his third consecutive game with an interception. On October 25, 1997, he set a season-high with seven solo tackles, made two pass deflections, and picked off a pass attempt by Dan Marino to wide receiver O.J. McDuffie during a 12–9 overtime loss at the Miami Dolphins. Head coach Pete Carroll benched Chris Canty after nine-games and replaced him with Steve Israel. Opponents regularly targeted Canty with positive results to avoid challenging Law on the right side. On November 8, 1998, Law made four combined tackles (two solo), two pass deflections, and tied his season-high with two interceptions off passes by Chris Chandler as the Patriots lost 41–10 against the Atlanta Falcons. In Week 14, he recorded six solo tackles, set a career-high with seven pass deflections, and intercepted a pass by Kordell Stewart to wide receiver Charles Johnson during a 23–9 win at the Pittsburgh Steelers. On December 20, 1998, Law recorded four combined tackles (three solo), made one pass deflection, and set a career-high with his ninth interception of the season on a pass by Steve Young to wide receiver Terrell Owens as the Patriots defeated the San Francisco 49ers 20–23. He started in all 16 games for the second season in-a-row and recorded 70 combined tackles (60 solo), 32 pass deflections, nine interceptions, and one touchdown. He became the first player in franchise history to lead the league in interceptions and was selected to the 1999 Pro Bowl, marking the first Pro Bowl selection of his career after four seasons and also marked the first of five Pro Bowl selections over his career.

==== 1999 ====
On August 21, 1999, the New England Patriots re–signed Law to a newly restructered seven–year, $51 million contract that included an initial signing bonus of $14.20 million. The deal added six additional years to his remaining one–year on his rookie contract and kept him under contract throughout the 2005 NFL season. The deal was the largest contract for a cornerback in league history. Head coach Pete Carroll retained Law and Steve Israel as the starting cornerbacks to begin the season, following Patriots' decision to cut Chris Canty.

On October 17, 1999, Law set a season-high with nine combined tackles (eight solo), made two pass deflections, and returned an interception by backup quarterback Damon Huard for a 27–yard touchdown during a 31–30 loss against the Miami Dolphins. On October 31, 1999, Law recorded six solo tackles, set a season-high with three pass deflections, and intercepted a pass by Dave Brown to wide receiver Frank Sanders during a 27–3 victory at the Arizona Cardinals. In Week 13, Law made six combined tackles (three solo) and had a pass break-up before he exited in the fourth quarter of a 6–13 loss against the Dallas Cowboys after breaking a finger while he tackled wide receiver Rocket Ismail. He attempted to play through his injury with a cast for the next two games. On December 29, 1999, the Patriots officially placed Law on injured reserve due to a broken hand that sidelined him for the last two games (Weeks 15–16). He finished the season with 57 combined tackles (48 solo), nine pass deflections, two forced fumbles, two interceptions, and one touchdown.

==== 2000 ====
On January 3, 2000, the New England Patriots fired head coach Pete Carroll after an 8–8 record in 1999, while New York Jets' head coach Bill Parcells announced his retirement and named Bill Belichick his heir apparent. The following day, Bill Belichick resigned as head coach of the Jets during an introductory press conference. Patriots announced Bill Belichick as their new head coach and general manager after they reached an agreement to trade their first-round pick (16th overall) in the 2000 NFL draft to the Jets in order to acquire Belichick.

On April 25, 2000, the Patriots signed cornerback Antonio Langham to pair with Law following the departure of Steve Israel. Bill Belichick had coached Langham during his time as the head coach of the Cleveland Browns. In order to determine who would start alongside Law, the Patriots held a competition inbetween Antonio Langham, Tebucky Jones, Kato Serwanga, and J'Juan Cherry. On August 23, 2000, the Patriots signed cornerback Otis Smith who was a former teammate in 1996. Head coach Bill Belichick named Law and Antonio Langham the starting cornerbacks to begin the season.

On September 7, 2000, he set a season-high with nine combined tackles (eight solo) and had one pass break-up during a 21–13 loss against the Kansas City Chiefs. On October 8, 2000, Law made one tackle, a pass deflection, and helped secure a 24–16 victory against the Indianapolis Colts by intercepting a pass by Peyton Manning to tight end Ken Dilger in the fourth quarter. In Week 14, Law recorded two solo tackles and set a season-high with four pass deflections as the Patriots defeated the Kansas City Chiefs 30–24.

On December 18, 2000, Law was stopped for a routine inspection by U.S. Customs officials in Niagara Falls, New York, while crossing the Rainbow Bridge with teammates Terry Glenn and Troy Brown as they returned from visiting an adult nightclub in Canada. During the routine inspection, officials found three whole ecstasy pills and four that were partially crushed. Federal prosecutors declined to prosecute Law due to the small amount. U.S. Customs seized the drug and fined Law $700. On December 20, 2000, New England Patriots’ head coach Bill Belichick announced his decision to suspend Law for the final game of the season. He remained inactive due to his suspension as the Patriots lost 27–24 against the Miami Dolphins in Week 17. He finished the season with 74 combined tackles (58 solo), 11 pass deflections, and two interceptions in 15 games and 15 starts.

==== 2001 ====
On February 1, 2001, the New England Patriots hired Romeo Crennel to take over duties as defensive coordinator. Throughout training camp, the Patriots held a competition in between Otis Smith, Terrance Shaw, and Terrell Buckley following the departure of Antonio Langham. Head coach Bill Belichick named Law and Otis Smith the starting cornerbacks to begin the season.

In Week 2, he set a season-high with ten combined tackles (seven solo) during a 3–10 loss against the New York Jets. On September 30, 2001, Law made three combined tackles (two solo), one pass deflection, and had returned an interception Peyton Manning threw on a pass to tight end Ken Dilger for a 23–yard touchdown as the Patriots defeated the Indianapolis Colts 13–44. On November 11, 2001, Law made four solo tackles, a pass deflection, one sack, and sealed a 11–21 victory against the Buffalo Bills by intercepting a pass by Alex Van Pelt to wide receiver Peerless Price with only 1:27 remaining in the fourth quarter. In Week 17, Law recorded four solo tackles, had one pass deflection, and intercepted a pass Chris Weinke threw to wide receiver Steve Smith Sr. and returned it 49–yards for a touchdown during a 38–6 win at the Carolina Panthers. He started all 16 games and finished with season with 70 combined tackles (60 solo), nine pass deflections, three interceptions, one sack, and set a career-high with two touchdowns. He was selected to the 2002 Pro Bowl, becoming his second Pro Bowl of his career.

===== Super Bowl XXXVI =====
The New England Patriots finished the 2001 NFL season first in the AFC East with an 11–5 record to clinch a first-round bye. On January 19, 2002, Law led the Patriots with 12 combined tackles (ten solo) and had two pass deflections during a 13–16 overtime victory against the Oakland Raiders in the AFC Divisional Round that is now known as the Tuck Rule Game. The ending to this game became controversial due to the "Tuck rule". The following week, the Patriots defeated the Pittsburgh Steelers 17–24 in the AFC Championship Game. On February 3, 2002, Law started in Super Bowl XXXVI against the St. Louis Rams and recorded seven solo tackles, made one pass deflection, and intercepted a pass Kurt Warner threw to wide receiver Isaac Bruce 47–yards to score the first touchdown of the game as the Patriots won 20–17. This earned Law the first Super Bowl ring of his career.

==== 2002 ====
He returned as the No. 1 starting cornerback along with the entire secondary, including Otis Smith, Terrell Buckley, Tebucky Jones, and Lawyer Milloy with Eric Mangini as their defensive backs coach. On September 9, 2002, Law started in the New England Patriots' home-opener against the Pittsburgh Steelers and set a season-high with ten combined tackles (nine solo) and had his lone sack of the season on Kordell Stewart for a six–yard loss in a 14–30 victory. In Week 9, Law recorded six combined tackles (five solo), set a season-high with three pass deflections, and intercepted a pass Drew Bledsoe threw to wide receiver Eric Moulds during a 38–7 victory at the Buffalo Bills. In Week 14, Law made five combined tackles (four solo), one pass deflection, and helped secure a 17–27 win against the Buffalo Bills by intercepting a pass Drew Bledsoe to Eric Moulds in the fourth quarter. He started in all 16 games and tied his career-high with 77 combined tackles (60 solo) and also had ten pass deflections, four interceptions, and one sack. His performance earned him his third Pro Bowl selection.

==== 2003 ====
The New England Patriots were in need of cornerback talent to replace Terrell Buckley and fill in for Otis Smith after he underwent surgery for a torn pectoral muscle. In response, the Patriots signed free agent cornerback Tyrone Poole and drafted cornerbacks Eugene Wilson in the second round (36th overall) and Asante Samuel in the fourth round (120th overall) of the 2003 NFL draft.

He entered spring camp with a leg injury that sidelined him alongside Otis Smith. Rookies Eugene Wilson and Asante Samuel both progressed quickly in their absence by receiving first-team reps. On August 18, 2003, the Patriots cut expected No. 2 starting cornerback Otis Smith. Head coach Bill Belichick named Law the No. 1 starting cornerback to begin the season, but was reluctant to name the No. 2 starting cornerback stating Tyrone Poole, Eugene Wilson, and Asante Samuel would all play.

On October 5, 2003, Law made five combined tackles (four solo), one pass deflection, and sealed the Patriots' 30–38 victory against the Tennessee Titans by intercepting a pass Steve McNair threw to wide receiver Tyrone Calico and returned it 65–yards for a touchdown with 2:01 remaining as the Patriots were leading 27–31. He was inactive as the Patriots won 19–13 at the Miami Dolphins due to an ankle injury. On October 26, 2003, Law made seven combined tackles (six solo), a pass deflection, and sealed the Patriots' 3–9 victory against the Cleveland Browns by intercepting a pass Kelly Holcomb threw to wide receiver Kevin Johnson with exactly one minute remaining.plo), set a season-high with four pass deflections, and also a season-high with two interceptions on passes thrown by Quincy Carter as the Patriots defeated the Dallas Cowboys 0–12. In Week 14, he recorded four combined tackles (three solo), had three pass deflections, and sealed the Patriots' 12–0 win against the Miami Dolphins by intercepting a pass Jay Fiedler threw to wide receiver Chris Chambers with 4:59 remaining. In Week 16, he set a season-high with nine combined tackles (eight solo), had one pass break-up, and intercepted a pass by Chad Pennington to wide receiver Santana Moss during a 21–16 victory at the New York Jets. He finished the season with 74 combined tackles (61 solo), six interceptions, one sack, and scored one touchdown in 15 games and 15 starts. He set a career-high with 23 pass deflections. He was selected for the 2004 Pro Bowl.

===== Super Bowl XXXVIII =====
The New England Patriots finished the 2003 NFL season with a 14–2 record, placing first in the AFC East and earning a first-round bye. On January 18, 2004, Law started in the AFC Championship Game and made three combined tackles (two solo), three pass deflections, and set a career-high with three interceptions off passes thrown by Peyton Manning as the Patriots defeated the Indianapolis Colts 14–24. His three interception performance tied five other players for second most interceptions in a single playoff game, after Vernon Perry with four interceptions in 1979. The last player with three interceptions in a playoff game was 1983. Hours later, Carolina Panthers' rookie cornerback Ricky Manning would coincidentally tie the record as well, with three interceptions off of Donovan McNabb in the NFC Championship Game against the Philadelphia Eagles. On February 1, 2004, Law started in Super Bowl XXXVIII against the Carolina Panthers and recorded five solo tackles and made one pass deflection during their 32–29 victory.

==== 2004 ====
Head coach Bill Belichick named him the No. 1 starting cornerback to begin the season and paired him with Tyrone Poole with Asante Samuel as the nickelback. In Week 5, he set a season-high with nine combined tackles (five solo) during a 24–10 victory at the Miami Dolphins. On October 17, 2004, Law recorded six combined tackles (four solo), set a season-high with two pass deflections, and had his lone interception of the season on a pass Matt Hasselbeck threw to wide receiver Darrell Jackson as the Patriots defeated the Seattle Seahawks 20–30. On October 31, 2004, Law exited during the first quarter of a 20–34 loss at the Pittsburgh Steelers after injuring his foot. On November 3, 2004, it was confirmed by the Patriots that Law had broken a bone in his left foot and was expected to miss 4–6 weeks. On December 18, 2004, the Patriots placed Tyrone Poole on season-ending injured reserve due to a knee injury. The broken bone in Law's left foot would sideline him for the last eight games (Weeks 10–17) of the season. Asante Samuel would replace Law as the No. 1 starting cornerback and Tyrone Poole was also replaced by undrafted rookie Randall Gay. He finished the season with 29 combined tackles (23 solo), three pass deflections, and one interception in seven games and seven starts. On January 7, 2005, the Patriots officially placed Law on injured reserve precluding him from the playoffs due to a broken bone in his foot.

===== Super Bowl XXXIX =====
The New England Patriots would finish the 2004 NFL season with another 14–2 record to reclaim first in the AFC East with another first-round bye. Asante Samuel and Randall Gay would start in Law and Poole's place throughout the playoffs as the Patriots defeated the Indianapolis Colts 20–3 in the Divisional Round and would win the AFC Championship Game 41–27 at the Pittsburgh Steelers. On February 6, 2005, the New England Patriots would defeat the Philadelphia Eagles 24–21 in Super Bowl XXXIX, claiming back-to-back Super Bowl Championships. Law would earn his third and final Super Bowl ring.

Before being released, Law underwent surgery to repair ligament damage in his foot on January. On February 25, 2005, the New England Patriots, released Law due to his $12.551 million cap salary. He reportedly refused to restructure his contract when asked by the Patriots. Upon becoming an unrestricted free agent, Law was sought by multiple teams, including the Detroit Lions, Pittsburgh Steelers, Jacksonville Jaguars, and the Kansas City Chiefs. He attended a private workout with the Jacksonville Jaguars and had two private workouts with the Detroit Lions. The St. Louis Rams also expressed strong interest in acquiring Law. On August 6, 2005, the New York Jets and Law's agent, Carl Poston, were in the final stages of contract negotiations with an agreement in principle already completed.

=== New York Jets (first stint) ===
On August 8, 2005, the New York Jets signed Law to a three-year contract as an unrestricted free agent. The contract had incentives that could pay Law $28 million over the first three years and also has options that total $50 million over seven years.

On February 22, 2006, the New York Jets released Law only one year into his three–year contract as the Jets were a projected $26 million over the salary cap for 2006. He was due to make $7.6 million in 2006.

=== Kansas City Chiefs ===
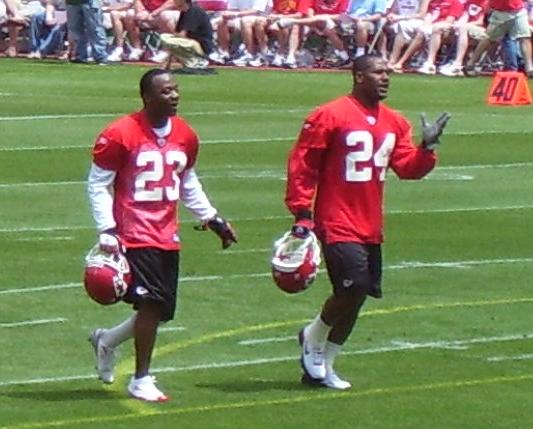
Law (right) with former Chiefs teammate Patrick Surtain in 2007

On July 25, 2006, Law signed a five-year contract worth $30 million. He reunited with coach Herman Edwards, under whom Law had played in the 2005 season hoping to strengthen the Chiefs' defense. He was unable to duplicate the Pro Bowl season he had in New York in two seasons with the Chiefs, and the team released him on February 28, 2008.

=== New York Jets (second stint) ===
On November 10, 2008, Law agreed to terms on a one-year contract with the New York Jets.

=== Denver Broncos ===
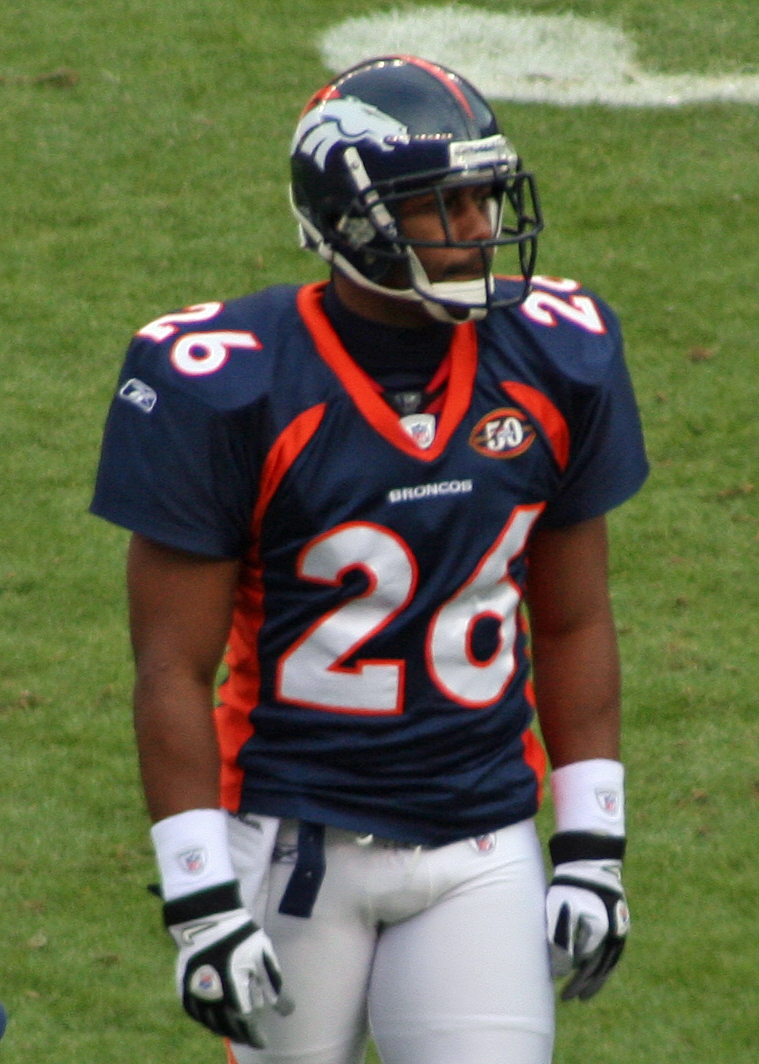
Law with the Denver Broncos in 2009

Law signed with the Denver Broncos on November 7, 2009. This added to a defensive backfield that had five members over 30 years of age, with 20 Pro Bowl selections combined. His final game with the Broncos came on January 3, 2010. He finished the season with 10 tackles and one interception run back for 37 yards. He was released by the Broncos on February 24, 2010.

His time in Denver was short and uneventful, only lasting a season. It was his second choice, as he would have preferred to play in New England, but signed with Denver. Even though his last season was in Denver, Law stated, "I am a Patriot for life."

== NFL career statistics ==
Legend
	Won the Super Bowl
	Led the league
**Bold**	Career high

Year	Team	GP	Tackles				Interceptions						Fumbles	
Year	Team	GP	Cmb	Solo	Ast	Sck	Int	Yds	Avg	Lng	TD	PD	FF	FR
1995	NE	14	47	40	7	**1.0**	3	47	16	38	0	9	0	0
1996	NE	13	62	56	6	0.0	3	45	15	38	1	9	0	0
1997	NE	**16**	**77**	**69**	8	0.5	3	70	23	40	0	11	0	**1**
1998	NE	**16**	70	60	10	0.0	9	133	15	59	1	**32**	0	**1**
1999	NE	13	57	48	9	0.5	2	20	10	27	1	9	2	**1**
2000	NE	15	74	58	16	0.0	2	32	16	32	0	11	0	0
2001	NE	**16**	69	59	10	**1.0**	3	91	30	46	**2**	9	0	0
2002	NE	**16**	76	59	**17**	**1.0**	4	33	8	29	0	10	1	**1**
2003	NE	15	73	60	13	0.0	6	112	19	65	1	23	0	0
2004	NE	7	28	23	5	0.0	1	0	0	0	0	3	0	0
2005	NYJ	**16**	62	45	**17**	0.0	**10**	**195**	20	**74**	1	18	0	0
2006	KC	**16**	68	64	4	**1.0**	4	11	3	16	0	9	**3**	0
2007	KC	**16**	47	39	8	0.0	2	2	1	2	0	13	0	0
2008	NYJ	7	19	14	5	0.0	0	0	0	0	0	2	1	0
2009	DEN	7	10	9	1	0.0	1	**37**	**37**	37	0	1	0	0
Career		203	839	703	136	5.0	53	828	16	74	7	169	7	4

== Retirement ==
After retiring from the NFL, Law founded Launch Trampoline Park, a chain of entertainment facilities based around large areas of connected trampolines. Launch currently has franchised locations across New England, with one park open in Delaware. The website of its Rhode Island location reports that Law makes frequent appearances there, where he participates in games of trampoline dodgeball with customers.

On May 19, 2014, Law was announced as the 2014 Patriots Hall of Fame Inductee. He was inducted on August 1. On February 2, 2019, he was selected to the Pro Football Hall of Fame class of 2019; he was inducted on August 3, 2019, in Canton, Ohio.

== See also ==
- List of NFL annual interceptions leaders
- List of NFL career interceptions leaders
