= Fairland, Oklahoma =

- Town
- Location within Ottawa County and the state of Oklahoma
- Coordinates: 36°45′01″N 94°50′51″W
- Country: United States
- State: Oklahoma
- County: Ottawa

Area
  - Total: 1.12 sq mi (2.90 km^{2})
  - Land: 1.12 sq mi (2.90 km^{2})
  - Water: 0 sq mi (0.00 km^{2})
- Elevation: 840 ft (260 m)

Population (2020)
  - Total: 1,106
  - Density: 987.9/sq mi (381.44/km^{2})
- Time zone: UTC-6 (Central (CST))
  - Summer (DST): UTC-5 (CDT)
- ZIP code: 74343
- Area codes: 539/918
- FIPS code: 40-24900
- GNIS feature ID: 2412614

Fairland is a town in southern Ottawa County, Oklahoma, United States. As of the 2020 census, Fairland had a population of 1,106. The town is in the historic Cherokee Nation.

== History ==
Fairland was laid out along the St. Louis and San Francisco Railway (Frisco) tracks that were laid from Missouri to Vinita in 1871. The town originally covered 225 acres and consisted of a few businesses and residences that had moved there from the Prairie Springs area. (Note: Prairie Springs was located further east, along the Grand River. It is now a ghost town.)

By the time Oklahoma became a state, Fairland was an active farming community. In 1912, the Missouri, Oklahoma and Gulf Railway, later the Kansas, Oklahoma and Gulf Railway (KO&G), constructed a track through Fairland that crossed the earlier Frisco line.

Agriculture remained the mainstay of the local economy until the end of World War II. In 1945, B. F. Goodrich opened a tire manufacturing plant near Miami that became the major contributor to Fairland's economy. The town organized a volunteer fire department and built a sewer system about 1950. The Fairland School district absorbed several smaller districts. (Note: The districts absorbed were Aurora, Black, Sulphur Bend, Ogeechee, Hudson Creek, Lone Star, and parts of Iron Post and Osceola.) However, KO&G abandoned and removed its tracks about the same time.

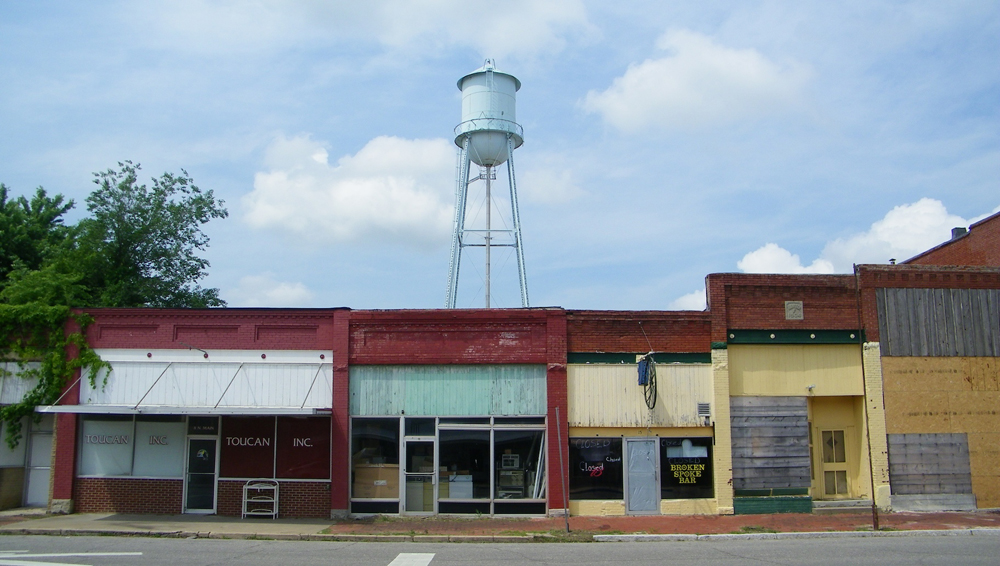
The old city water tower standing over Main Street in Fairland, Oklahoma

The Goodrich plant closed permanently in February 1985. The loss to Fairland's economy was offset by the opening of several communities (Note: The communities included were Port Aspinwall, Wildcat Hollow, and Osage Hollow.) on the shore of Grand Lake O' the Cherokees.

== Geography ==
According to the United States Census Bureau, the town has a total area of 0.9 square miles (2.3 km^{2}), all land. The town sits on a small rise in the landscape, which is the headwaters of three creeks: Hudson Creek watershed to the Northwest, the Ogeechee Creek watershed to the East, and the Horse Creek Watershed to the Southwest. All of these creeks eventually drain into the Neosho River.

== Demographics ==
Historical population
Census	Pop.	Note	%±
1900	499		—
1910	569		14.0%
1920	818		43.8%
1930	679		−17.0%
1940	786		15.8%
1950	699		−11.1%
1960	646		−7.6%
1970	814		26.0%
1980	1,073		31.8%
1990	916		−14.6%
2000	1,025		11.9%
2010	1,057		3.1%
2020	1,106		4.6%
U.S. Decennial Census

=== 2020 census ===
As of the 2020 census, Fairland had a population of 1,106. The median age was 38.9 years. 24.4% of residents were under the age of 18 and 20.5% of residents were 65 years of age or older. For every 100 females there were 93.0 males, and for every 100 females age 18 and over there were 92.6 males age 18 and over.

0.0% of residents lived in urban areas, while 100.0% lived in rural areas.

There were 441 households in Fairland, of which 35.4% had children under the age of 18 living in them. Of all households, 40.6% were married-couple households, 19.0% were households with a male householder and no spouse or partner present, and 32.7% were households with a female householder and no spouse or partner present. About 26.5% of all households were made up of individuals and 11.3% had someone living alone who was 65 years of age or older.

There were 480 housing units, of which 8.1% were vacant. The homeowner vacancy rate was 0.3% and the rental vacancy rate was 11.6%.

Racial composition as of the 2020 census
Race	Number	Percent
White	694	62.7%
Black or African American	11	1.0%
American Indian and Alaska Native	199	18.0%
Asian	2	0.2%
Native Hawaiian and Other Pacific Islander	5	0.5%
Some other race	1	0.1%
Two or more races	194	17.5%
Hispanic or Latino (of any race)	40	3.6%

=== 2000 census ===
As of the census of 2000, there were 1,025 people, 415 households, and 292 families residing in the town. The population density was 1,109.4 inhabitants per square mile (428.3/km^{2}). There were 452 housing units at an average density of 489.2 per square mile (188.9/km^{2}). The racial makeup of the town was 71.80% White, 0.20% African American, 20.39% Native American, 0.10% Pacific Islander, 0.10% from other races, and 7.41% from two or more races. Hispanic or Latino of any race were 0.88% of the population.

There were 415 households, out of which 32.3% had e age of 18 living with them, 53.3% were married couples living together, 14.2% had a female householder with no husband present, and 29.6% were non-families. 27.5% of all households were made up of individuals, and 15.9% had someone living alone who was 65 years of age or older. The average household size was 2.41 and the average family size was 2.89.

In the town, the population was spread out, with 24.2% under the age of 18, 8.6% from 18 to 24, 24.6% from 25 to 44, 20.7% from 45 to 64, and 22.0% who were 65 years of age or older. The median age was 39 years. For every 100 females, there were 86.0 males. For every 100 females age 18 and over, there were 82.0 males.

The median income for a household in the town was $27,240, and the median income for a family was $28,885. Males had a median income of $28,155 versus $15,208 for females. The per capita income for the town was $12,024. About 8.1% of families and 12.4% of the population were below the poverty line, including 18.0% of those under age 18 and 12.1% of those age 65 or over.

== Notable people ==
- J. R. Conrad, National Football League player for the New England Patriots and New York Jets
- Lloyd Kiva New (Cherokee, 1916–2002), fashion designer and co-founder of the Institute of American Indian Arts, was born in Fairland.

== See also ==
- List of municipalities in Oklahoma
