= Marty Moore (American football) =

American football player (born 1971)

No. 58, 55, 90
- Position: Linebacker

Personal information
- Born: March 19, 1971 (age 55); Phoenix, Arizona, U.S.
- Listed height: 6 ft 1 in (1.85 m)
- Listed weight: 235 lb (107 kg)

Career information
- High school: Highlands (Fort Thomas, Kentucky)
- College: Kentucky
- NFL draft: 1994: 7th round, 222nd overall pick

Career history
- New England Patriots (1994–1999); Cleveland Browns (2000); New England Patriots (2001)

Awards and highlights
- Super Bowl champion (XXXVI); First-team All-SEC (1993); Second-team All-SEC (1992); Inducted into KY Pro Football HOF (2006)

Career NFL statistics
- Tackles: 173
- Interceptions: 3
- Forced fumbles: 2
- Stats at Pro Football Reference

William Martin Moore (born March 19, 1971) is an American former professional football player who was a linebacker for eight seasons in the National Football League (NFL) for the New England Patriots and Cleveland Browns. Moore was the first Mr. Irrelevant ever to play in a Super Bowl, Super Bowl XXXI, with the Patriots. He also became the first Mr. Irrelevant to win a Super Bowl in Super Bowl XXXVI, also with the Patriots.

Moore played high school football for Highlands High in Fort Thomas, Kentucky, and college football for the Kentucky Wildcats, playing in the 1993 Peach Bowl and becoming the final pick in the 1994 NFL draft after his senior season.

== NFL career statistics ==
Legend
	Won the Super Bowl
**Bold**	Career high

Year	Team	Games		Tackles				Interceptions				Fumbles			
Year	Team	GP	GS	Comb	Solo	Ast	Sck	Int	Yds	TD	Lng	FF	FR	Yds	TD
1994	NE	16	4	25	16	9	0.0	0	0	0	0	**2**	0	0	0
1995	NE	16	2	15	14	1	0.0	0	0	0	0	0	0	0	0
1996	NE	16	0	2	2	0	0.0	0	0	0	0	0	0	0	0
1997	NE	16	0	8	6	2	0.0	**2**	**7**	0	**7**	0	0	0	0
1998	NE	14	2	13	7	6	0.0	0	0	0	0	0	**1**	0	0
1999	NE	15	2	18	14	4	0.0	0	0	0	0	0	0	0	0
2000	CLE	16	9	**90**	**74**	**16**	**1.0**	1	3	0	3	0	0	0	0
2001	NE	3	0	2	0	2	0.0	0	0	0	0	0	0	0	0
Career		112	19	173	133	40	1.0	3	10	0	7	2	1	0	0
