= Tedy Bruschi =

American football player (born 1973)

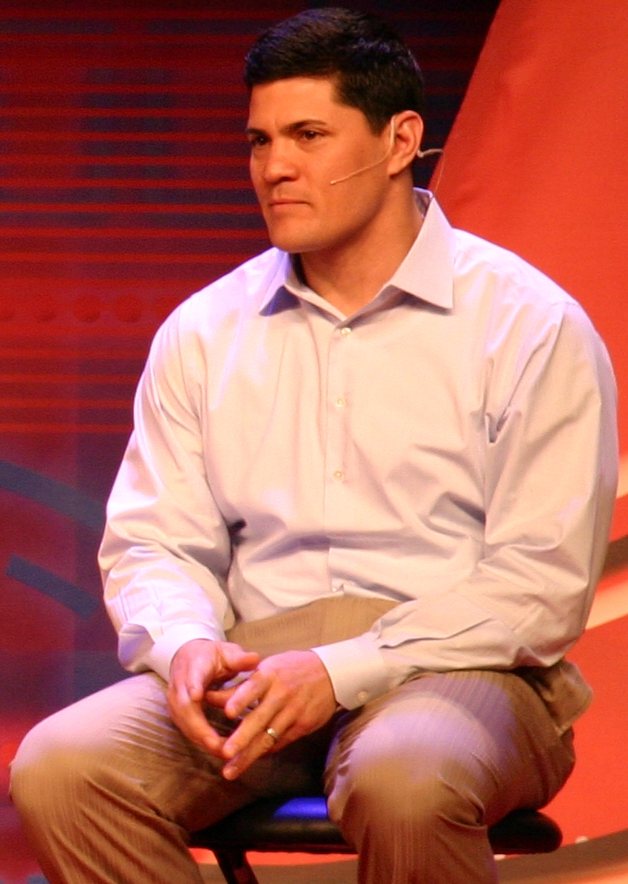
- Bruschi in 2010

No. 54
- Position: Linebacker

Personal information
- Born: June 9, 1973 (age 53); San Francisco, California, U.S.
- Listed height: 6 ft 1 in (1.85 m)
- Listed weight: 247 lb (112 kg)

Career information
- High school: Roseville (Roseville, California)
- College: Arizona (1991–1995)
- NFL draft: 1996: 3rd round, 86th overall pick

Career history

Playing
- New England Patriots (1996–2008)

Coaching
- Arizona (2021–2023) Senior advisor to head coach

Awards and highlights
- 3× Super Bowl champion (XXXVI, XXXVIII, XXXIX); NFL Comeback Player of the Year (2005); 2× Second-team All-Pro (2003, 2004); Pro Bowl (2004); New England Patriots All-2000s Team; New England Patriots All-Dynasty Team; New England Patriots 50th Anniversary Team; New England Patriots Hall of Fame; Bill Willis Trophy (1995); Unanimous All-American (1995); Consensus All-American (1994); Second-team All-American (1993); Morris Trophy (1995); Pac-10 Defensive Player of the Year (1995); 3× First-team All-Pac-10 (1993–1995); Arizona Wildcats No. 68 retired

Career NFL statistics
- Tackles: 1,074
- Sacks: 30.5
- Forced fumbles: 17
- Fumble recoveries: 7
- Interceptions: 12
- Interception yards: 187
- Pass deflections: 57
- Total touchdowns: 5
- Stats at Pro Football Reference
- College Football Hall of Fame

Tedy Lacap Bruschi (/ˈbruːski/; born June 9, 1973) is an American former professional football player who was a linebacker in the National Football League (NFL) for 13 seasons. He played college football for the Arizona Wildcats, where he earned two-time consensus All-American. He was selected by the New England Patriots in the third round of the 1996 NFL draft, and played his entire professional career with them. Bruschi won three Super Bowls and was a two-time second-team All-Pro selection.

He served as the senior advisor to the head coach at the University of Arizona from 2021 to 2023.

== Early life ==
Bruschi was born on June 9, 1973, in San Francisco, California, to parents of Filipino and Italian descent. His mother was Filipino, while his father was American, the son of Italian immigrants originally from the frazione of Bruschi di Sopra in Bedonia, Italy. He attended Roseville High School in Roseville, California, where he lettered in football, wrestling and track and field (shot put). He was an all-conference selection as a defensive tackle for the Roseville Tigers.

== College career ==
Bruschi attended the University of Arizona, where he played for the Arizona Wildcats football team from 1991 to 1995. In his four-year college career, he compiled 185 total tackles (137 solos), with 74 tackles for losses, six fumbles and recovered five others and tied the NCAA Division I-A sack record with 52 sacks. He was recognized as a consensus first-team All-American in 1994 and 1995, and won the 199 Morris Trophy as the Pacific-10 Conference's best defensive lineman.

In 1991, he missed the first three games of the season due to a pinched nerve in his neck. He returned and started two games as a true freshman, but suffered a broken left thumb and was redshirted. In 1992, he played strongside outside linebacker prior to his transition to the defensive line in 1993 and started just one of 12 games and still managed to post 4.5 sacks for the season. In 1993, he earned second-team All-America honors after setting a school record with 19 sacks as a sophomore, received first-team All-Pac-10 honors, and was named the Wildcats' most valuable player. His 27.5 tackles for losses and 19 sacks in 1993 were each career highs. In 1994, he was one of four finalists for the Lombardi Award and again was a first-team All-Pac-10 selection. He totaled 39 tackles, including 10 sacks and 15 tackles for losses. In 1995, he totaled 60 tackles (48 solos), including 18.5 sacks and 22.5 tackles for losses. Bruschi was elected to the College Football Hall of Fame in 2013.

== Professional career ==
=== 1996–2001 ===
Prior to the NFL draft, Bruschi was invited to play in the East West Shrine Bowl Game.

The New England Patriots selected Bruschi in the third round (86th overall) of the 1996 NFL draft. Coming into the draft he was listed at 6'0 250 pounds and was considered too small to be a defensive end but was a good size to be a linebacker, which is the position that the New England coaches moved him to.

He played for the Patriots from 1996 to 2008. Bruschi never used an agent during his time with the New England Patriots.

In 1996, he played in every game as a rookie, a pass rush specialist who played on many special teams units and finished the season with 11 tackles, including four sacks. He ranked third on the team with 17 special teams tackles, and ran a blocked punt back for a TD in October. Bruschi recorded two sacks in Super Bowl XXXI against the Green Bay Packers, just one shy of the Super Bowl record (Reggie White, 3.0). In 1997, he saw action in every game for the second consecutive season and posted 30 defensive tackles, including four sacks, and added 13 special teams stops. His four sacks and 13 special teams tackles each ranked third on the team, and he also forced two fumbles, and recovered one. In 1998, Bruschi played in every game for the third consecutive year and started the last eight games of the season, including the Patriots wild-card playoff game in Jacksonville (January 3, 1999). He finished fourth on the team with a career-high 81 tackles, including a pair of sacks.

In 1999, he started 14 games at outside linebacker and recorded a career-high 138 total tackles, including two sacks. Bruschi finished second on the team in tackles, despite missing two games due to a right knee sprain. He made his first career interception, one of six passes defensed on the year. 2000 saw Bruschi start all 16 games at weakside linebacker and finished with 105 tackles (68 solos). It was his second consecutive season with over 100 tackles. In 2001, he started nine of 15 regular season games at linebacker and finished third on the team with 73 tackles. He was credited with two sacks, forced three fumbles, recovering one, and two interceptions.

=== 2002–2004 ===
In 2002, Bruschi was voted a defensive captain for the season by his teammates. He ranked seventh on the team with 65 tackles (45 solos) despite missing five games due to injury. He returned two interceptions for touchdowns (at Oakland, November 17, and at Detroit, November 28), the seventh time a Patriot interceptor has reached the end zone twice in a single season and the first time a linebacker has accomplished the feat. In 2003 he started all 16 games at inside linebacker as one of four defensive players to start all 16 games and he was voted a defensive captain for the season by his teammates. He ranked second on the team with 137 tackles (87 solo) and finished third on the team with 16 pass defenses. He was named AFC Defensive Player of the Week in Weeks Two and 14. In the 2004 regular season, Bruschi finished second on the team with 122 tackles (84 solo) and tied for second on the team with three interceptions. His solid play continued in the playoffs, where he finished second on the squad with 23 tackles (18 solo) and added a sack, an interception, a forced fumble and two fumble recoveries. Bruschi was named the AFC Defensive Player of the Week three times in 2004: Weeks 4 and 17 and in the Divisional Playoffs, when he forced a fumble and recovered two fumbles as the Patriots defense held the highly regarded Colts offense to just three points.

=== 2005 stroke ===
On February 15, 2005, at age 31 and just two days after playing in the 2005 Pro Bowl, Bruschi woke up with symptoms including left sided numbness, weakness, and vision problems. He was taken to Massachusetts General Hospital, where he diagnosed with an ischemic stroke, caused by a blocked artery in the brain. He was found to have a patent foramen ovale, a congenital heart defect that leaves a small hole in the wall separating the left and right atria of the heart. After several months of rehabilitation working with Spaulding Rehabilitation Hospital in Boston, Bruschi announced he would sit out the 2005 NFL season.

On October 16, 2005, the Patriots announced that Bruschi had been medically cleared to resume playing football; he rejoined the team on the practice field three days later. The Patriots officially activated him on October 29, and he played the following night against the Buffalo Bills; ESPN's broadcast of the game had several features and interviews on Bruschi's return. Following the game, Bruschi was named AFC Defensive Player of the Week. Bruschi played most of the remaining games that season, except for the final regular season game against Miami and the first playoff game against Jacksonville. Bruschi was named the 2005 NFL Comeback Player of the Year, an honor he shared with Carolina Panthers wide receiver Steve Smith.

=== 2006–2008 ===
At the start of training camp, Bruschi broke his right scaphoid bone which he had surgery on August 8. He was listed as questionable, and didn't play in the first game of the 2006 season against the Buffalo Bills. Bruschi was voted a defensive captain by his teammates and started the final 14 games at linebacker. He finished first on the team with 124 tackles. In the 2006 playoffs, Bruschi led the Patriots with 24 tackles (16 solo), marking the highest playoff tackle total of his career. He also led the team with 23 tackles (15 solo) in the 2007 playoffs. In 2007, he played in and started all 16 regular-season games for the fourth time in his career and was voted a defensive captain for the 2007 season. He tied a single-game career high with a two-sack performance against the Cleveland Browns on October 7, 2007, and ran his career total to 30.5 sacks, becoming the 13th player in Patriots' history to reach that milestone. Also he led the team in tackles (99) and solo tackles (69) in 2007. In 2008, he played in 13 games, starting 12, and was named a defensive captain by his teammates for the seventh season.

=== Touchdowns ===
Bruschi was the first player in NFL history to return four consecutive interceptions for touchdowns and his career total of four interceptions returned for touchdowns ranks second in Patriots history. He is tied for fourth in NFL history among linebackers, and Bruschi is the only Patriots linebacker to return multiple interceptions for touchdowns in a single season (2002 and 2003). Additionally, since 2002 Bruschi's defensive play has created seven defensive touchdowns. He scored four of those touchdowns on interception returns (two in both 2002 and 2003), forced two fumbles that were picked up and returned for touchdowns (October 3 and November 28, 2004), and tipped a pass that was intercepted by James Sanders and returned for a touchdown (December 11, 2005). This is in addition to his first career touchdown at Baltimore (October 6, 1996) when Bruschi recovered a blocked punt by Larry Whigham and returned it four yards for a touchdown, making 8 total touchdowns to which Bruschi contributed.

=== Retirement ===
On the August 30, 2009 broadcast of Sunday Night Football, Al Michaels reported that Bruschi would announce his retirement after 13 seasons in the NFL. Bruschi confirmed his retirement on August 31, 2009, at a press conference alongside New England Patriots head coach Bill Belichick and owner Robert Kraft. During this broadcast, Bruschi described how fulfilled he felt in completing his 13 years of playing football. He described how it felt to know that he had reached all of the goals he wanted to reach.

Bruschi joined ESPN as an analyst following his retirement.

Bruschi has indicated that he would prefer that his number, 54, not be retired. It was worn by six-time Pro Bowl guard Brian Waters in 2011 and by Dont'a Hightower the following season. The New England Patriots held a special ceremony in Bruschi's honor during halftime on Monday Night Football on December 6, 2010.

On May 21, 2013, Bruschi was voted by fans as the 19th player to enter the New England Patriots Hall of Fame. Bruschi's Patriots Hall of Fame induction ceremony occurred on July 29, 2013.

On February 1, 2015, Bruschi was an honorary captain at Super Bowl XLIX.

== NFL career statistics ==
Legend
	Won the Super Bowl
**Bold**	Career high

Year	Team	GP	Tackles				Fumbles			Interceptions					
Year	Team	GP	Comb	Solo	Ast	Sack	FF	FR	Yds	Int	Yds	Avg	Lng	TD	PD
1996	NE	16	11	10	1	4.0	1	0	0	0	0	0.0	0	0	0
1997	NE	16	30	25	5	4.0	2	2	0	0	0	0.0	0	0	1
1998	NE	16	74	48	27	2.0	2	0	0	0	0	0.0	0	0	3
1999	NE	14	108	73	35	2.0	1	1	0	1	1	1.0	1	0	8
2000	NE	16	108	71	37	1.0	1	0	0	0	0	0.0	0	0	5
2001	NE	15	76	55	21	2.0	3	1	0	2	7	3.5	4	0	3
2002	NE	11	67	47	20	**4.5**	1	0	0	2	**75**	**37.5**	**48**	2	7
2003	NE	16	**133**	**81**	52	2.0	3	1	**13**	3	26	8.7	18	2	**14**
2004	NE	16	124	78	46	3.5	3	0	0	3	70	23.3	36	0	6
2005	NE	9	63	37	26	2.0	1	0	0	0	0	0.0	0	0	3
2006	NE	15	112	53	**59**	1.5	0	**2**	0	1	8	8.0	8	0	6
2007	NE	16	92	64	28	2.0	0	0	0	0	0	0.0	0	0	2
2008	NE	13	76	38	38	0.0	0	0	0	0	0	0.0	0	0	1
Total		189	1074	680	394	30.5	18	7	13	12	187	15.6	48	4	59

== Personal life ==
Bruschi is one of three children. His stepfather, Ron Sandys, was a professional tennis player. His son, Dante Bruschi, committed to play college football for the Ithaca Bombers as a linebacker.

Bruschi is an accomplished saxophonist, having played with the Boston Pops.

In 2007, Bruschi wrote Never Give Up: My Stroke, My Recovery, and My Return to the NFL, a book about his experience with his stroke and his recovery. In his memoir, Bruschi speaks with candor about how his family confronted the reality of his life-threatening affliction, of his initial plans to retire from the NFL, and of the moment he told his wife he was ready to return to football, earning him a share of the Comeback Player of the Year Award and the Patriots recipient of the Ed Block Courage Award.

Bruschi is a spokesman for the American Heart Association and founded Tedy's Team, a foundation to raise funds for stroke research, inspired by Bruschi's own experience.

In 2007, Bruschi was named to NFL.com's All-Interview Team for accessibility to the media. In 2006, he won the Senator Paul E. Tsongas Award for Exemplary Public Service. In 2005, he was the Associated Press NFL Co-Comeback Player of the Year and was voted the Ed Block Courage Award, the Maxwell Football Club's Spirit Award and the AFC Defensive Player of the Week (Week 8) and NFL.com's All-Interview Team as well as USA Today's All-Joe Team. In 2004, he made the AFC Pro Bowl and Second-Team Associated Press All-Pro and was on NFL.com's All-Interview Team.

Bruschi ran in the Boston Marathon in 2012 and 2019.

On July 5, 2019, it was reported through his foundation, Tedy's Team, that Bruschi had suffered a second stroke.
