= Todd Collins (linebacker) =

American football player (born 1970)

No. 54, 59
- Position: Linebacker

Personal information
- Born: May 27, 1970 (age 56); New Market, Tennessee, U.S.
- Listed height: 6 ft 2 in (1.88 m)
- Listed weight: 248 lb (112 kg)

Career information
- College: Carson–Newman
- NFL draft: 1992: 3rd round, 64th overall pick

Career history
- New England Patriots (1992–1998); St. Louis Rams (1999–2000)

Awards and highlights
- Super Bowl champion (XXXIV)

Career NFL statistics
- Tackles: 435
- Sacks: 3.5
- Forced fumbles: 4
- Interceptions: 2
- Stats at Pro Football Reference

Todd Franklin Collins (born May 27, 1970) is an American former professional football player who was a linebacker in the National Football League (NFL). He started for the New England Patriots in Super Bowl XXXI, and Super Bowl XXXIV for the Rams.

Collins was a champion in high school and college football. He led Jefferson County High School to the 1987 TSSAA AAA State Championship. Coming out of Jefferson County, Collins was a USA Today High School All-American. He received a scholarship to the University of Georgia, where his older brother Brent was already enrolled. Injury problems kept Todd off the field during the 1988 season, and he transferred to the University of Tennessee for one semester. Both Collins brothers subsequently ended up at Carson-Newman College, with whom they won the 1989 NAIA National Championship.

Pre-draft measurables
Height	Weight	Arm length	Hand span	40-yard dash	10-yard split	20-yard split	20-yard shuttle	Vertical jump	Broad jump	Bench press
6 ft 2 in (1.88 m)	242 lb (110 kg)	31 3/4 in (0.81 m)	9 3/8 in (0.24 m)	4.66 s	1.61 s	2.67 s	4.07 s	39.0 in (0.99 m)	10 ft 7 in (3.23 m)	19 reps
All values from NFL Combine

Collins was selected by the New England Patriots in the third round of the 1992 NFL draft. He left the Patriots for the St. Louis Rams in 1999. Part of the compensation package the Patriots received from the Rams included the 199th pick in the 2000 NFL draft, which the Patriots used to draft Tom Brady.
