= Kantroy Barber =

American football player (born 1973)

No. 48
- Position: Running back

Personal information
- Born: October 4, 1973 (age 53); Miami, Florida, U.S.
- Listed height: 6 ft 0 in (1.83 m)
- Listed weight: 243 lb (110 kg)

Career information
- High school: Carol City (Miami Gardens, Florida)
- College: Colorado; West Virginia
- NFL draft: 1996: 4th round, 124th overall pick

Career history
- New England Patriots (1996); Carolina Panthers (1997); Tampa Bay Buccaneers (1998)*; Buffalo Bills (1998)*; Indianapolis Colts (1998); Miami Dolphins (1999)
- * Offseason or practice squad member only
- Stats at Pro Football Reference

Kantroy Barber (born October 4, 1973) is an American former professional football player who was a running back in the National Football League (NFL) for the New England Patriots, Carolina Panthers, and Miami Dolphins. He played college football for the Colorado and West Virginia] Mountaineers before being selected in the fourth round of the 1996 NFL draft. He attended Miami Carol City Senior High.
