= Chris Carter (defensive back) =

American football player (born 1974)

No. 42, 36
- Position: Safety

Personal information
- Born: September 27, 1974 (age 52); Tyler, Texas, U.S.
- Listed height: 6 ft 1 in (1.85 m)
- Listed weight: 201 lb (91 kg)

Career information
- High school: John Tyler (Tyler, Texas)
- College: Texas
- NFL draft: 1997: 3rd round, 89th overall pick

Career history
- New England Patriots (1997–1999); Cincinnati Bengals (2000–2001); Houston Texans (2002)

Awards and highlights
- First-team All-SWC (1995)

Career NFL statistics
- Tackles: 219
- Interceptions: 5
- Sacks: 4
- Stats at Pro Football Reference

Christopher Cary Carter (born September 27, 1974) is an American former professional football player who was a safety in the National Football League (NFL). He played college football for the Texas Longhorns and was selected in the third round of the 1997 NFL draft by the New England Patriots. He also played for the Cincinnati Bengals and Houston Texans.

== Early life ==
Carter went to John Tyler High School in Tyler, where he earned first-team All-America honors as a senior, playing free safety and wide receiver. He recorded 87 tackles with five interceptions and four fumble recoveries as a free safety and caught 37 passes for 778 yards with eight touchdowns as a receiver in his senior year, earning Second-Team AP 5A All-State and Third-Team TSWA 5A All-State Honors. As a junior he registered 148 tackles and five interceptions. He graduated in the top five percent of his class while also lettering in basketball and baseball and was a science club and National Honor Society member.

== College career ==
Carter played football at the University of Texas from 1993-1996 where he holds the school record for career interception return yards with 261 and is tied for the most interceptions by a freshman with 4. He played safety and returned punts.

In 1993, his freshman year, he led the team in interceptions and fumble recoveries and set the school record for interceptions by a freshman with 4, while also finishing in the school's top 10 for freshman in passes broken up (t-3rd), tackles (t-3rd) and solo tackles (4th). For his efforts he earned Freshman All-American honors.

In 1994, he helped the Longhorns to win a share of the Southwest Conference Championship and win the Sun Bowl. He led the team in pass breakups and interceptions that season, despite missing the first two games with a knee injury, and also set the record for the longest interception return in a bowl game in school history when he had a 69 yard return against North Carolina in the 1994 Sun Bowl.

In 1995 he led the team in blocked kicks and pass breakups; and led the Southwest Conference in interceptions with 6, including two against Texas A&M, and interception return yards with 146 as he helped the Longhorns win another Southwest Conference Championship and a trip to the 1996 Sugar Bowl. His interception return yards that season were the 2nd most in school history at the time and he earned 1st team All-Southwest Conference honors.

In 1996 he led the team in tackles and earned 3rd Team All-Big 12 honors as the Longhorns won the first Big 12 Championship and made a trip to the 1997 Fiesta Bowl.

He left Texas with 13 career interceptions, which was tied for 4th most in school history at the time; and the 4th most tackles and solo tackles in school history.

After his final season, he played in the 1996 Senior Bowl.

== Professional career ==
Carter was selected by the New England Patriots in the third round of the 1997 NFL draft, 89th overall. He was signed later that summer.

He played three seasons with the Patriots, helping them to make the playoffs in 1997 and 1998. After playing almost exclusively on special teams his first two seasons (racking up 20 special teams tackles in 1998), he became a regular starter in 1999. That season he had career highs with interceptions (3) (2nd most on the team), interception return yards (13), pass deflections (8), fumble recoveries (2), sacks (1), tackles (70) and tackle assists (25), despite suffering a hamstring injury in the second to last game and missing the final game of the season. He intercepted Peyton Manning twice in one game that season. He became a free agent at the end of the 1999 season and was resigned by the Patriots who then released him at the end of camp after he lost the starting job to Tebucky Jones, the team's first-round pick in 1998.

The next day he was signed by the Bengals for whom he played all of the 2000 season. They moved him to strong side safety, after playing free safety for the Patriots and he set or tied career highs in solo tackles (54), fumbles forced (2), sacks (1) and TFLs (4). Though a free agent at the end of the season, he returned to the Bengals for the 2001 season. He saw his playing time reduced but managed to get the longest interception return of his career with a 10-yard return against Cleveland and match his career high with 2 fumble recoveries for a career high 12 yards. He again became a free agent at the end of the year.

He was signed by the Houston Texans in the offseason. The 2002 season with the Texans was his least productive since his rookie year, though he did match his career high 1 sack. He was released by the Texans with 2 games remaining on the schedule.

== NFL career statistics ==
Legend
**Bold**	Career high

Year	Team	Games		Tackles				Interceptions				Fumbles			
Year	Team	GP	GS	Comb	Solo	Ast	Sck	Int	Yds	TD	Lng	FF	FR	Yds	TD
1997	NWE	16	0	1	1	0	0.0	0	0	0	0	0	0	0	0
1998	NWE	16	0	13	9	4	**1.0**	0	0	0	0	0	0	0	0
1999	NWE	15	15	**70**	45	**25**	**1.0**	**3**	**13**	0	8	0	**2**	0	0
2000	CIN	16	10	66	**54**	12	**1.0**	1	6	0	6	**2**	1	0	0
2001	CIN	16	4	59	42	17	0.0	1	10	0	**10**	0	**2**	**12**	0
2002	HOU	13	0	10	10	0	**1.0**	0	0	0	0	0	0	0	0
Total		92	29	219	161	58	4.0	5	29	0	10	2	5	12	0
