= Ferric Collons =

American football player (born 1969)

Profile
- Position: Defensive end

Personal information
- Born: December 4, 1969 (age 56); Scott Air Force Base, Illinois, U.S.

Career information
- College: California

Career history
- 1992–1993: Los Angeles Raiders
- 1995: Jacksonville Jaguars*
- 1995: Green Bay Packers*
- 1995–1999: New England Patriots
- * Offseason or practice squad member only
- Stats at Pro Football Reference

Ferric Collons (born December 4, 1969) is an American former professional football player who was a defensive end for the New England Patriots of the National Football League (NFL) from 1995 to 1999. He played college football for the California Golden Bears (1987-1991).

== Early life ==
Collons was born in 1969 at Scott Air Force Base in St. Clair County, Illinois. He attended Jesuit High School in the suburbs of Sacramento, California, and then enrolled at the University of California, Berkeley. He played football for the Golden Bears from 1987 to 1991.

== Professional football ==
Collons was not selected in the 1992 NFL draft and worked for the next two years as a bar bouncer and for the United Parcel Service. He was a practice squad player for the Los Angeles Raiders in 1992. He returned to the Raiders in 1994, but he was cut before the regular season. He was one of the first players signed by the Jacksonville Jaguars in 1994 but was released and then claimed briefly by the Atlanta Falcons. He signed with the Green Bay Packers in 1995 and played for the Packers in preseason games.

In August 1995, Collons was traded by the Packers to the New England Patriots. He remained with the Patriots from 1995 to 1999. He was a member of the 1996 Patriots team that won the AFC championship and lost to the Packers in Super Bowl XXXI. Collons sacked quarterback Brett Favre in the Super Bowl, and in April 1997, he signed a contract to play two more years for the Patriots for $1.25 million. He was released by the Patriots after the 1998 season but returned in 1999 after signing a one-year free agent contract for the veteran minimum of $400,000. Over five NFL seasons, Collons appeared in a total of 64 NFL games, 27 as a starter, and registered 7.5 sacks.
