= Marrio Grier =

American football player (1971–2022)

No. 35
- Positions: Running back, Linebacker

Personal information
- Born: December 5, 1971; Charlotte, North Carolina, U.S.
- Died: March 15, 2022 (aged 50); Charlotte, North Carolina, U.S.
- Listed height: 5 ft 10 in (1.78 m)
- Listed weight: 229 lb (104 kg)

Career information
- High school: Independence (Charlotte, North Carolina)
- College: Clemson (1992–1993), Chattanooga (1994–1995)
- NFL draft: 1996: 6th round, 195th overall pick

Career history
- New England Patriots (1996–1997); Carolina Cobras (2000–2002); Colorado Crush (2003)

Career NFL statistics
- Rushing attempts: 60
- Rushing yards: 180
- Rushing average: 3
- Rushing touchdowns: 2
- Receptions: 1
- Receiving yards: 8
- Stats at Pro Football Reference

Marrio Darnell Grier (December 5, 1971 – March 15, 2022) was an American professional football running back in the National Football League (NFL) who played two seasons for the New England Patriots. He played college football for the Clemson University before transferring to University of Tennessee at Chattanooga. He also played as a running back and linebacker in the Arena Football League (AFL) for the Carolina Cobras and Colorado Crush. Grier died on March 15, 2022, at the age of 50.

== NFL career ==
Grier was drafted 195th in the 6th round of the NFL draft. He was waived at the end of the 1997–1998 preseason.
