= Jimmy Hitchcock (cornerback) =

American football player (born 1970)

No. 31, 37
- Position: Cornerback

Personal information
- Born: November 9, 1970 (age 55); Concord, North Carolina, U.S.
- Listed height: 5 ft 10 in (1.78 m)
- Listed weight: 190 lb (86 kg)

Career information
- High school: Concord
- College: North Carolina
- NFL draft: 1995: 3rd round, 88th overall pick

Career history
- New England Patriots (1995–1997); Minnesota Vikings (1998–1999); Carolina Panthers (2000–2001); New England Patriots (2002); Detroit Lions (2002)

Awards and highlights
- NFL interception return yards leader (1998)

Career NFL statistics
- Tackles: 351
- Interceptions: 19
- Touchdowns: 5
- Stats at Pro Football Reference

Jimmy Davis Hitchcock Jr. (born November 9, 1970) is an American former professional football player who was a cornerback in the National Football League (NFL). He was selected by the New England Patriots in the third round of the 1995 NFL draft. He played for the Patriots, Minnesota Vikings, and Carolina Panthers. He played college football at the University of North Carolina. In 1997, Hitchcock became the record holder for the longest interception return in Patriots history with a 100-yard pick six against the Miami Dolphins. In 1998, he led the league in interception yards with 242 yards and defensive touchdowns with three. Remarkably, Hitchcock played his entire professional and collegiate careers without both of his ACL's in his knees.

After retiring from the NFL, Hitchcock ran into legal issues with his involvement in widespread mortgage fraud. He was indicted and pleaded guilty through a broader crackdown operation called Operation Wax House.

== NFL career statistics ==
Legend
| | Led the league |
| **Bold** | Career high |

=== Regular season ===
| Year | Team | Games | | Tackles | | | | Interceptions | | | | Fumbles | | | |
| Year | Team | GP | GS | Comb | Solo | Ast | Sck | Int | Yds | TD | Lng | FF | FR | Yds | TD |
|---|---|---|---|---|---|---|---|---|---|---|---|---|---|---|---|
| 1995 | NWE | 8 | 0 | 4 | 4 | 0 | 0.0 | 0 | 0 | 0 | 0 | 0 | 0 | 0 | 0 |
| 1996 | NWE | 13 | 5 | 32 | 27 | 5 | 0.0 | 2 | 14 | 0 | 14 | 0 | 0 | 0 | 0 |
| 1997 | NWE | 15 | 15 | **83** | 65 | **18** | 0.0 | 2 | 104 | 1 | **100** | **1** | 0 | 0 | 0 |
| 1998 | MIN | 16 | 16 | 67 | 58 | 9 | 0.0 | **7** | **242** | **3** | 79 | 0 | **1** | **1** | 0 |
| 1999 | MIN | 16 | 16 | 82 | **73** | 9 | **2.0** | 2 | 0 | 0 | 0 | **1** | 0 | 0 | 0 |
| 2000 | CAR | 16 | 2 | 30 | 29 | 1 | 0.0 | 3 | 116 | 1 | 88 | **1** | 0 | 0 | 0 |
| 2001 | CAR | 16 | 7 | 53 | 45 | 8 | 0.0 | 3 | 65 | 0 | 35 | 0 | 0 | 0 | 0 |
| 2002 | NWE | 1 | 0 | 0 | 0 | 0 | 0.0 | 0 | 0 | 0 | 0 | 0 | 0 | 0 | 0 |
| | | 101 | 61 | 351 | 301 | 50 | 2.0 | 19 | 541 | 5 | 100 | 3 | 1 | 1 | 0 |

=== Playoffs ===
| Year | Team | Games | | Tackles | | | | Interceptions | | | | Fumbles | | | |
| Year | Team | GP | GS | Comb | Solo | Ast | Sck | Int | Yds | TD | Lng | FF | FR | Yds | TD |
|---|---|---|---|---|---|---|---|---|---|---|---|---|---|---|---|
| 1997 | NWE | 2 | 2 | **8** | **8** | 0 | 0.0 | 0 | 0 | 0 | 0 | 0 | 0 | 0 | 0 |
| 1998 | MIN | 2 | 2 | 7 | 7 | 0 | 0.0 | 0 | 0 | 0 | 0 | 0 | 0 | 0 | 0 |
| 1999 | MIN | 2 | 2 | 7 | 7 | 0 | 0.0 | **1** | 0 | 0 | 0 | 0 | 0 | 0 | 0 |
| | | 6 | 6 | 22 | 22 | 0 | 0.0 | 1 | 0 | 0 | 0 | 0 | 0 | 0 | 0 |
