= Chris Sullivan (American football) =

American football player (born 1973)

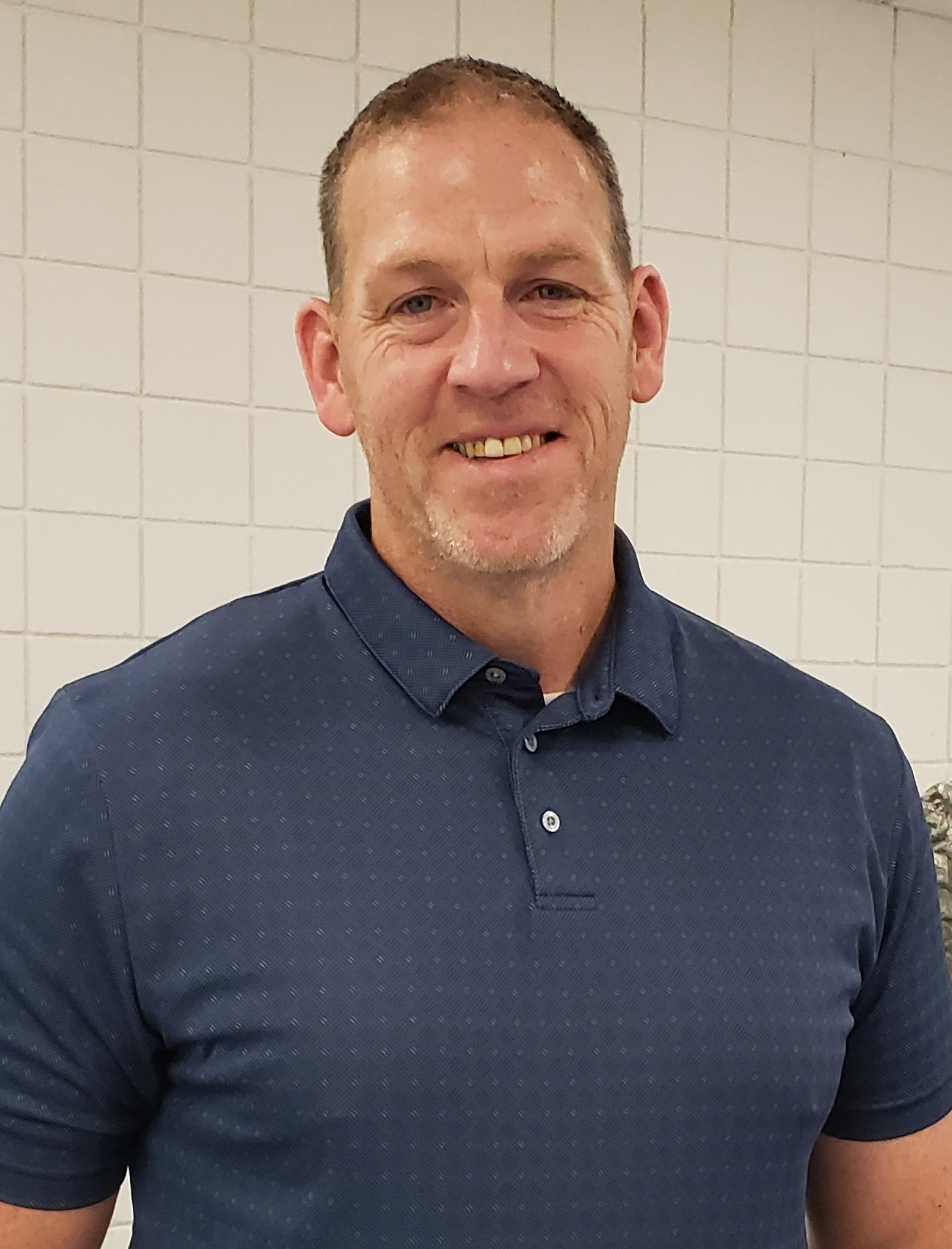

No. 74
- Position: Defensive end

Personal information
- Born: March 14, 1973 (age 53); North Attleborough, Massachusetts, U.S.
- Listed height: 6 ft 4 in (1.93 m)
- Listed weight: 279 lb (127 kg)

Career information
- High school: North Attleborough
- College: Boston College
- NFL draft: 1996: 4th round, 119th overall pick

Career history
- New England Patriots (1996–1999); Pittsburgh Steelers (2000); New England Patriots (2001)

Awards and highlights
- Super Bowl champion (XXXVI)

Career NFL statistics
- Tackles: 109
- Sacks: 3
- Fumble recoveries: 3
- Stats at Pro Football Reference

Christopher Patrick Sullivan (born March 14, 1973) is an American former professional football player who was a defensive lineman for the New England Patriots and Pittsburgh Steelers of the National Football League (NFL). He played college football for the Boston College Eagles and was selected 119th overall in the fourth round of the 1996 NFL draft. After retiring following the 2002 season, Sullivan was arrested in 2005 in Attleboro, Massachusetts and charged with driving under the influence of drugs, possession of heroin with intent to distribute, illegal possession of a prescription drug, disorderly conduct, and driving to endanger.

In 2008, two weeks after becoming sober, Sullivan attended a parents' night at a local school. The topic of the night was drugs, as Kathi Meyer had spoken to the school earlier that day. Her daughter, Taylor, had died due to underage drinking after partying with friends, after which Kathi became an advocate for ending teen addiction.

The two fell in love after this night and married in 2011. They now travel to schools across the East Coast speaking about alcoholism and addiction.
