= Lovett Purnell =

American football player (born 1972)

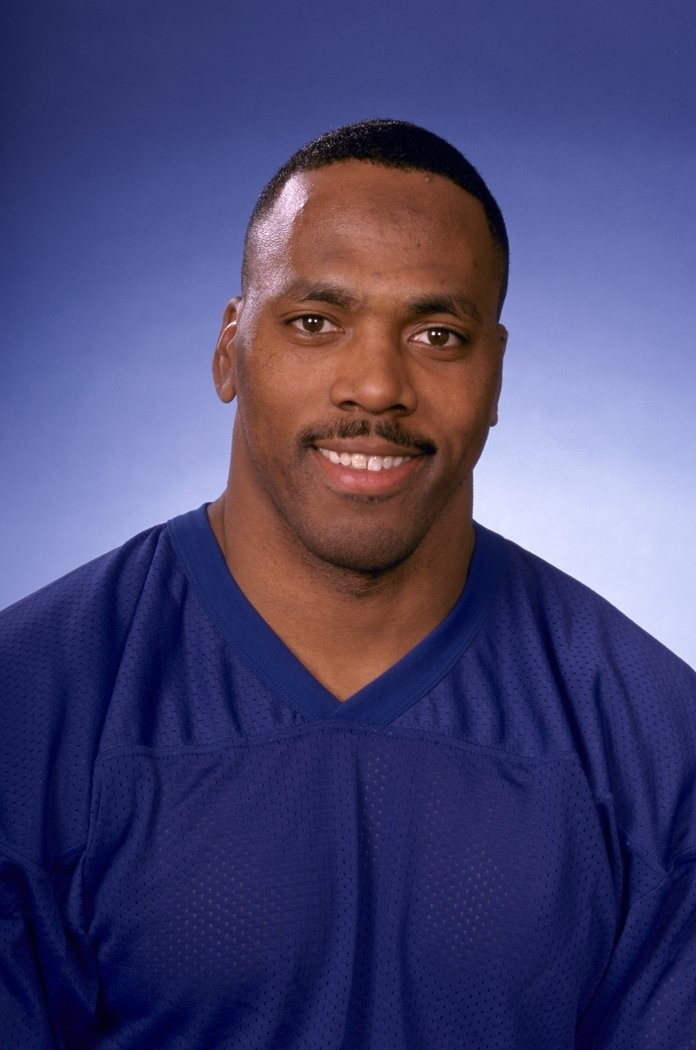

No. 48, 85, 80,
- Position: Tight end

Personal information
- Born: April 7, 1972 (age 54); Seaford, Delaware, U.S.
- Listed height: 6 ft 3 in (1.91 m)
- Listed weight: 245 lb (111 kg)

Career information
- High school: Seaford
- College: West Virginia
- NFL draft: 1996: 7th round, 216th overall pick

Career history
- New England Patriots (1996–1998); Baltimore Ravens (1999); Tampa Bay Buccaneers (2000)*
- * Offseason or practice squad member only

Awards and highlights
- Delaware Sports Museum/Hall of Fame (2007)

Career NFL statistics
- Receptions: 19
- Receiving yards: 159
- Receiving touchdowns: 5
- Stats at Pro Football Reference

Lovett Shaizer Purnell (born April 7, 1972) is an American former professional football player who was a tight end in the National Football League (NFL). He played college football for the West Virginia Mountaineers.

Purnell graduated from Seaford High School in Delaware and attended Valley Forge before going to West Virginia University. After Graduating from WVU, he was selected 216th overall by the New England Patriots in the seventh round of the 1996 NFL draft. A member of the Patriots from 1996 to 1998 and Baltimore Ravens in 1999, Purnell Has 19 career receptions for 159 yards and 5 touchdowns in 36 career games (7 starts).

At West Virginia, Purnell tallied 78 catches, 1,161 yards and ten scores. He was named MVP of the 1995 season, which led to his seventh-round selection in the NFL draft by New England. During four NFL seasons with the Patriots and Baltimore Ravens, Purnell played in 36 games, catching 19 passes for 159 yards and five touchdowns.

The Delaware Sports Museum and Hall of Fame inducted Purnell in 2007.
