= Big Eight Conference football =

Defunct American college athletic conference

The Big Eight Conference is a defunct college athletic conference that was formerly affiliated with the National Collegiate Athletic Association (NCAA) Division I-A (now known as FBS). The Big Eight was a successful football conference, with its member schools being recognized as consensus national champion on eleven occasions, including the last two football seasons the conference existed (1994 and 1995). Seven players from the Big Eight won the Heisman Trophy, the most prestigious national award for college football players.

== History ==
The conference was formed in 1907 as the Missouri Valley Intercollegiate Athletic Association (MVIAA) by five charter schools: the University of Kansas, University of Missouri, University of Nebraska, University of Iowa, and Washington University in St. Louis. After the MVIAA grew to ten schools, six state schools split away on their own in 1928, becoming known as the "Big Six": Iowa State, Kansas, Kansas State, Missouri, Nebraska and Oklahoma. The University of Colorado was added in 1948, and the conference became known as the "Big Seven Conference". Oklahoma State joined in 1958, becoming the eighth and final member. The conference broke up when its members joined the Big 12 Conference in 1996.

Due to its common history with the Missouri Valley Conference, Big Eight championships from 1907 through 1927 are also claimed by the MVC.

=== Bowl games ===
The first Big Eight conference team to attend a bowl game was Missouri, at the 1924 Los Angeles Christmas Festival. Following the 1938 season Oklahoma became the second to attend a bowl game, at the fifth-annual Orange Bowl in Miami, Florida. In 1951 and 1952 the conference had a brief ban on its members attending bowl games. When the conference resumed accepting invitations in 1953, its champion regularly thereafter attended the Orange Bowl. This tradition was broken only five times: 1964 (when Nebraska faced #2 Arkansas in the Cotton Bowl); 1966 (when Nebraska faced #3 Alabama in the Sugar Bowl); 1973 and 1974 (when undefeated Oklahoma was on probation and barred from bowl games); and 1995 (when #1 Nebraska played in the Bowl Alliance championship vs. #2 Florida at the Fiesta Bowl).

At the 1979 Orange Bowl, #6 Nebraska and #4 Oklahoma were paired against each other in a rematch of their conference game earlier in the season.

=== Rankings ===
In the 1971 NCAA University Division football season, Big Eight teams finished ranked #1 (Nebraska), #2 (Oklahoma) and #3 (Colorado) in the nation in the AP Poll – the only time in college football history teams from one conference have held the top three spots in the final poll. In the final AP Poll issued before the Big Eight became the Big 12, half of the conference's teams were ranked in the nation's top 10 (#1 Nebraska, #5 Colorado, #7 Kansas State, #9 Kansas).

=== Rivalries ===
The Nebraska–Oklahoma football rivalry was one of the most significant in the nation, with national title implications involved during many seasons. The 1971 Nebraska vs. Oklahoma football game is commonly referred to as "The Game of the Century."

With common histories dating back even before the 1907 formation of the conference, many of the Big Eight's rivalries were among the most-played in college football. At the time the Big Eight Conference dissolved in 1996, the conference had the two longest uninterrupted series in Division I-A football: Kansas–Oklahoma (played annually since 1903) and Kansas–Nebraska (played annually since 1906). Many of the conference's series began in the 19th century, including:

- Kansas–Missouri, first played in 1891 (second-most played series in Division I-A in 1996)
- Nebraska–Kansas, first played in 1892
- Nebraska–Missouri, first played in 1892
- Missouri–Iowa State, first played in 1896
- Nebraska–Iowa State, first played in 1896
- Kansas–Iowa State, first played in 1898

All of the above series except Kansas-Iowa State have been inactive since at least 2012 due to conference realignment.

== Champions ==
=== Conference champions ===
Following are the MVIAA/Big Eight football conference champions from 1907 to 1995 (shared championship years are shown in italics):

Football conference championships (1907–1995)
School	Total titles	Outright titles	Years
Colorado	5	3	1961 · 1976 · 1989 · 1990 · 1991
Drake	0	0	
Grinnell	0	0	
Iowa	1	0	1907
Iowa State	2	0	1911 · 1912
Kansas	5	2	1908 · 1930 · 1946 · 1947 · 1968
Kansas State	1	1	1934
Missouri	12	10	1909 · 1913 · 1919 · 1924 · 1925 · 1927 · 1939 · 1941 · 1942 · 1945 · 1960^{†} · 1969
Nebraska	41	31	1907 · 1910 · 1911 · 1912 · 1913 · 1914 · 1915 · 1916 · 1917 · 1921 · 1922 · 1923 · 1928 · 1929 · 1931 · 1932 · 1933 · 1935 · 1936 · 1937 · 1940 · 1963 · 1964 · 1965 · 1966 · 1969 · 1970 · 1971 · 1972^{‡} · 1975 · 1978 · 1981 · 1982 · 1983 · 1984 · 1988 · 1991 · 1992 · 1993 · 1994 · 1995
Oklahoma	34	26	1920 · 1933 · 1938 · 1943 · 1944 · 1946 · 1947 · 1948 · 1949 · 1950 · 1951 · 1952 · 1953 · 1954 · 1955 · 1956 · 1957 · 1958 · 1959 · 1962; 1967 · 1968 · 1972^{‡} · 1974 · 1975 · 1976 · 1977 · 1978 · 1979 · 1980 · 1984 · 1985 · 1986 · 1987
Oklahoma State	2	1	1926 · 1976
Washington (St. Louis)	0	0	

^{†} Kansas would have won the 1960 title, but after found to be using an ineligible player they were forced to forfeit their victories over Missouri and Colorado, which meant that Missouri was awarded the 1960 Big Eight title.
^{‡} Oklahoma initially won the 1972 title, but after it was found that they used ineligible players, they were penalized by the NCAA, though they did not force OU to forfeit games. The Big Eight asked them to forfeit three games and awarded the title to Nebraska, but Oklahoma still claims these wins and this title.

=== National championships ===
Big Eight football teams were recognized as national champion on eleven occasions, including four times as back-to-back champions:

- 1950 – Oklahoma
- 1955 – Oklahoma
- 1956 – Oklahoma
- 1970 – Nebraska (AP; UPI coaches conducted final poll prior to bowl games and awarded championship to Texas)
- 1971 – Nebraska
- 1974 – Oklahoma (AP; ineligible for UPI coaches poll championship due to NCAA probation. USC named champion of coaches poll)
- 1975 – Oklahoma
- 1985 – Oklahoma
- 1990 – Colorado (AP; UPI coaches poll championship awarded to Georgia Tech)
- 1994 – Nebraska
- 1995 – Nebraska

== Accolades ==
The Big Seven Conference established a Coach of the Year award in 1948. The conference began awarding a Player of the Year award in 1967, and began giving separate offensive and defensive awards in 1971. The final awards were given after the 1995 season, after which all of the Big Eight schools entered the Big 12 Conference.

=== Player of the Year ===
Season	Player	Pos.	Team
1967	Granville Liggins	NT	Oklahoma
1968	Steve Owens	RB	Oklahoma
1969	Steve Owens (2)	RB	Oklahoma
1970	Jerry Murtaugh	LB	Nebraska
1971	Greg Pruitt	RB	Oklahoma

=== Offensive Player of the Year ===
Season	Player	Pos.	Team
1972	George Amundson	QB	Iowa State
1973	Joe Washington	RB	Oklahoma
1975	Joe Washington (2)	RB	Oklahoma
1975	Nolan Cromwell	QB	Kansas
1976	Terry Miller	RB	Oklahoma State
1977	Terry Miller (2)	RB	Oklahoma State
1978	Billy Sims	RB	Oklahoma
1979	Billy Sims (2)	RB	Oklahoma
1980	Phil Bradley	QB	Missouri
1981	Dave Rimington	C	Nebraska
1982	Mike Rozier	RB	Nebraska
1983	Mike Rozier (2)	RB	Nebraska
1984	Danny Bradley	QB	Oklahoma
1985	Thurman Thomas	RB	Oklahoma State
1986	Jamelle Holieway	QB	Oklahoma
1987	Thurman Thomas (2)	RB	Oklahoma State
1988	Barry Sanders	RB	Oklahoma State
1989	Darian Hagan	QB	Colorado
1989	Gerry Gdowski	QB	Nebraska
1990	Eric Bieniemy	RB	Colorado
1991	Tony Sands	RB	Kansas
1992	Calvin Jones	RB	Nebraska
1993	Charles Johnson	WR	Colorado
1994	Rashaan Salaam	RB	Colorado
1995	Tommie Frazier	QB	Nebraska

=== Defensive Player of the Year ===
Season	Player	Pos.	Team
1972	Rich Glover	DT	Nebraska
1973	Lucious Selmon	NT	Oklahoma
1974	Rod Shoate	LB	Oklahoma
1975	Lee Roy Selmon	DT	Oklahoma
1976	Clete Pillen	DE	Nebraska
1977	George Cumby	LB	Oklahoma
1978	John Corker	LB	Oklahoma State
1979	George Cumby (2)	LB	Oklahoma
1980	Derrie Nelson	DE	Nebraska
1981	Jeff Gaylord	LB	Missouri
1982	Rick Bryan	DE	Oklahoma
1983	Rick Bryan (2)	DE	Oklahoma
1984	Leslie O'Neal	DT	Oklahoma State
1985	Brian Bosworth	LB	Oklahoma
1986	Brian Bosworth (2)	LB	Oklahoma
1987	Dante Jones	LB	Oklahoma
1988	Broderick Thomas	LB	Nebraska
1989	Alfred Williams	LB	Colorado
1990	Alfred Williams (2)	LB	Colorado
1991	Joe Bowden	LB	Oklahoma
1992	Deon Figures	CB	Colorado
1993	Trev Alberts	LB	Nebraska
1994	Ed Stewart	LB	Nebraska
1995	Tim Colston	DT	Kansas State

=== Coach of the Year ===
Season	Coach	Team
1948	Bud Wilkinson	Oklahoma
1949	Bud Wilkinson (2)	Oklahoma
1950	Bud Wilkinson (3)	Oklahoma
1951	Bud Wilkinson (4)	Oklahoma
1952	Bud Wilkinson (5)	Oklahoma
1953	Bud Wilkinson (6)	Oklahoma
1954	Bud Wilkinson (7)	Oklahoma
1955	Bud Wilkinson (8)	Oklahoma
1956	Dallas Ward	Colorado
1957	Chuck Mather	Kansas
1958	Dan Devine	Missouri
1959	Clay Stapleton	Iowa State
1960	Dan Devine (2)	Missouri
1961	Sonny Grandelius	Colorado
1962	Bob Devaney	Nebraska
1963	Bob Devaney (2)	Nebraska
1964	Bob Devaney (3)	Nebraska
1965	Eddie Crowder	Colorado
1966	Jim Mackenzie	Oklahoma
1967	Chuck Fairbanks	Oklahoma
1968	Pepper Rodgers	Kansas
1968	Dan Devine (3)	Missouri
1969	Floyd Gass	Oklahoma State
1970	Bob Devaney (4)	Nebraska
1971	Johnny Majors	Iowa State
1972	Al Onofrio	Missouri
1973	Tom Osborne	Nebraska
1973	Barry Switzer	Oklahoma
1974	Barry Switzer (2)	Oklahoma
1975	Bud Moore	Kansas
1975	Tom Osborne (2)	Nebraska
1976	Earle Bruce	Iowa State
1977	Earle Bruce (2)	Iowa State
1978	Tom Osborne (3)	Nebraska
1979	Jimmy Johnson	Oklahoma State
1980	Tom Osborne (4)	Nebraska
1981	Don Fambrough	Kansas
1982	Jim Dickey	Kansas State
1983	Warren Powers	Missouri
1983	Tom Osborne (5)	Nebraska
1984	Mike Gottfried	Kansas
1985	Bill McCartney	Colorado
1986	Barry Switzer (3)	Oklahoma
1987	Barry Switzer (4)	Oklahoma
1988	Tom Osborne (6)	Nebraska
1989	Bill McCartney (2)	Colorado
1990	Bill Snyder	Kansas State
1990	Bill McCartney (3)	Colorado
1991	Bill Snyder (2)	Kansas State
1991	Glen Mason	Kansas
1992	Tom Osborne (7)	Nebraska
1993	Bill Snyder (3)	Kansas State
1993	Tom Osborne (8)	Nebraska
1994	Tom Osborne (9)	Nebraska
1995	Glen Mason (2)	Kansas

=== All-Time Team ===
After the final Big Eight season was completed in 1995, a panel of twelve longtime observers selected an all-time conference team:

Position	Player	Team	Tenure
Offense
QB	Lynn Dickey	Kansas State	1968–1970
RB	Billy Sims	Oklahoma	1975–1979
RB	Gale Sayers	Kansas	1962–1964
WR	Hart Lee Dykes	Oklahoma State	1985–1988
WR	Johnny Rodgers	Nebraska	1970–1972
TE	Keith Jackson	Oklahoma	1984–1987
OL	Dean Steinkuhler	Nebraska	1979–1983
OL	Zach Wiegert	Nebraska	1991–1994
OL	Greg Roberts	Oklahoma	1975–1978
OL	Joe Romig	Colorado	1959–1961
C	Dave Rimington	Nebraska	1979–1982
Defense
DL	Lee Roy Selmon	Oklahoma	1972–1975
DL	Rich Glover	Nebraska	1970–1972
DL	Leslie O'Neal	Oklahoma State	1982–1985
DL	Willie Harper	Nebraska	1970–1972
LB	Brian Bosworth	Oklahoma	1983–1986
LB	Gary Spani	Kansas State	1974–1977
LB	Rod Shoate	Oklahoma	1972–1974
CB	Johnny Roland	Missouri	1962–1965
CB	Roger Wehrli	Missouri	1966–1968
S	Randy Hughes	Oklahoma	1971–1974
S	Rickey Dixon	Oklahoma	1984–1987
Special Teams
K	Uwe von Schamann	Oklahoma	1975–1978
P	Barry Helton	Colorado	1984–1987
RS	Barry Sanders	Oklahoma State	1986–1988

=== Heisman Trophy winners ===
Seven players from the Big Eight won the Heisman Trophy, the most prestigious national award for college football players:

Season	Player	Pos.	Team
1952	Billy Vessels	HB	Oklahoma
1969	Steve Owens	RB	Oklahoma
1972	Johnny Rodgers	WR	Nebraska
1978	Billy Sims	RB	Oklahoma
1983	Mike Rozier	RB	Nebraska
1988	Barry Sanders	RB	Oklahoma State
1994	Rashaan Salaam	RB	Colorado

=== AFCA Coach of the Year ===
Season	Coach	Team
1949	Bud Wilkinson	Oklahoma
1989	Bill McCartney	Colorado
1994	Tom Osborne	Nebraska

=== Eddie Robinson Coach of the Year ===
Season	Coach	Team
1971	Bob Devaney	Nebraska
1989	Bill McCartney	Colorado
