= 2002 New England Patriots season =

43rd season in franchise history

- Owner: Robert Kraft
- Head coach: Bill Belichick
- Home stadium: Gillette Stadium

Results
- Record: 9–7
- Division place: 2nd AFC East
- Playoffs: Did not qualify
- All-Pros: K Adam Vinatieri (1st team)
- Pro Bowlers: ST Larry Izzo; CB Ty Law; SS Lawyer Milloy; DT Richard Seymour; K Adam Vinatieri; C Damien Woody

Uniform
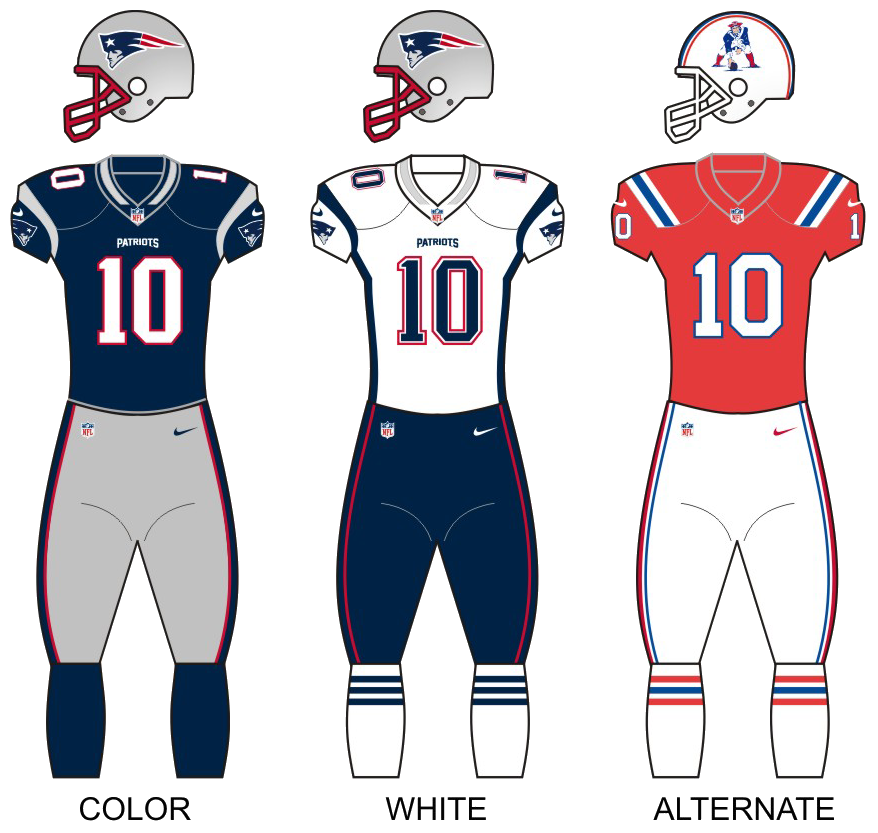

The 2002 season was the New England Patriots' 33rd in the National Football League (NFL), their 43rd overall and their third under head coach Bill Belichick. They finished with a 9–7 record, good enough for second in the division but not a playoff berth. It was their first season at their new home field, Gillette Stadium, which replaced the adjacent Foxboro Stadium.

This was the first season since 1992 that Drew Bledsoe was not on the opening day roster, as he was traded to the Buffalo Bills during the offseason.

Following their victory in Super Bowl XXXVI seven months earlier, the Patriots played their first game in the new Gillette Stadium in the NFL's primetime Monday Night Football opener against the Pittsburgh Steelers, a win for the Patriots. After an additional two wins to begin the season, including a 44–7 road win against the division rival New York Jets, the team lost five of its next seven games, allowing an average of 137 rushing yards a game during that span. In the final week of the season, the Patriots defeated the Miami Dolphins on an overtime Adam Vinatieri field goal to give both teams a 9–7 record. A few hours later, the Jets, who defeated the Patriots the week prior, also finished with a 9–7 record with a win over the Green Bay Packers. Due to their record against common opponents, after the Jets won the tiebreaker for the division title, both the Patriots and Dolphins were eliminated from the playoff contention. The 2002 season was the only time the Patriots failed to win at least 10 games during the regular season in the Brady–Belichick era. It also marked the only season with Tom Brady as the primary starter that the team failed to make the playoffs, and the only time that Brady lost four consecutive games. The Patriots would not fail to win another AFC East title or miss the postseason again until 2008.

== Offseason ==
Additions	Subtractions
TE Cam Cleeland (Saints)	QB Drew Bledsoe (Bills)
TE Christian Fauria (Seahawks)	WR Terry Glenn (Packers)
WR Donald Hayes (Panthers)	LB Bryan Cox (Saints)
DE Rick Lyle (Jets)	WR Charles Johnson (Bills)
	DT Brandon Mitchell (Seahawks)
	TE Rod Rutledge (Texans)
	CB Terrance Shaw (Raiders)

=== 2002 expansion draft ===
New England Patriots selected during the expansion draft
Round	Overall	Name	Position	Expansion team
—	10	Matt Stevens	Safety	Houston Texans

=== 2002 NFL draft ===
2002 New England Patriots draft
Round	Pick	Player	Position	College	Notes
1	21	Daniel Graham	Tight end	Colorado	from Tampa Bay via Oakland and Washington (Note: The Patriots traded their first-, third- and seventh-round draft picks to the Washington Redskins for the Redskins' first-round pick.)
2	65	Deion Branch	Wide receiver	Louisville	
4	117	Rohan Davey	Quarterback	LSU	from Denver (Note: The Patriots traded fourth- and fifth-round draft picks to the Denver Broncos for the Broncos' fourth-round pick. The Patriots received the fifth-round pick in a trade with the Jacksonville Jaguars for the Patriots' sixth-round pick in the 2001 NFL draft.)
4	126	Jarvis Green	Defensive end	LSU	from Green Bay (Note: The Patriots received a fourth-round pick from the Green Bay Packers in a trade for Terry Glenn and a conditional pick in the 2003 NFL draft.)
7	237	Antwoine Womack	Running back	Virginia	from Miami via Dallas (Note: The Patriots traded a fifth-round pick to the Dallas Cowboys for the Cowboys' fifth- and seventh-round draft picks.)
7	253	David Givens	Wide receiver	Notre Dame	Compensatory pick
Made roster

=== Undrafted free agents ===
2002 undrafted free agents of note
Player	Position	College
T.C. Taylor	Wide Receiver	Jackson State

== Staff ==
2002 New England Patriots staff
Front office: Chairman/CEO – Robert Kraft; Vice chairman – Jonathan Kraft; Senior vice president/coo – Andy Wasynczuk; Vice president of player personnel – Scott Pioli; Assistant director of player personnel – Jason Licht; Director of college scouting – Larry Cook; Assistant director of college scouting – Lionel Vital; Assistant director of pro scouting – Andre Tippett; Assistant director of pro scouting – Keith Kidd; Football research director – Ernie Adams; Head coaches: Head coach – Bill Belichick; Assistant head coach/offensive line – Dante Scarnecchia; Offensive coaches: Offensive coordinator/quarterbacks – Charlie Weis; Running backs – Ivan Fears; Wide receivers – Brian Daboll; Assistant offensive line – Jeff Davidson; Coaching assistant – Josh McDaniels	Defensive coaches: Defensive coordinator/defensive line – Romeo Crennel; Inside linebackers – Pepper Johnson; Outside linebackers – Rob Ryan; Defensive Backs – Eric Mangini; Coaching assistant – Nick Caserio; Special teams coaches: Special teams – Brad Seely; Strength and conditioning: Strength and conditioning – Mike Woicik; Assistant strength and conditioning – Markus Paul

== Final roster ==
2002 New England Patriots roster
Quarterbacks (QB): 12 Tom Brady; 6 Rohan Davey; 19 Damon Huard; Running backs (RB): 44 Marc Edwards FB; 33 Kevin Faulk KR; 35 Patrick Pass FB; 21 J. R. Redmond; 32 Antowain Smith; Wide receivers (WR): 83 Deion Branch KR; 80 Troy Brown PR; 84 Fred Coleman; 87 David Givens; 81 Donald Hayes; 86 David Patten; Tight ends (TE): 49 Fred Baxter; 85 Cam Cleeland; 88 Christian Fauria	Offensive linemen (OL): 63 Joe Andruzzi G; 68 Tom Ashworth G/T; 77 Mike Compton G; 71 Russ Hochstein G; 74 Kenyatta Jones T; 70 Adrian Klemm G/T; 62 Matt Knutson T; 72 Matt Light T; 64 Greg Randall T; 67 Grey Ruegamer C; 65 Damien Woody C; Defensive linemen (DL): 97 Jarvis Green DE; 91 Bobby Hamilton DE; 99 Bernard Holsey DT; 96 Rick Lyle DT; 55 Willie McGinest DE; 98 Anthony Pleasant DE; 93 Richard Seymour DT	Linebackers (LB): 54 Tedy Bruschi; 53 Larry Izzo OLB; 52 Ted Johnson MLB; 55 Willie McGinest DE; 95 Roman Phifer OLB; 59 Maugaula Tuitele OLB; 50 Mike Vrabel OLB; Defensive backs (DB): 22 Terrell Buckley CB; 30 Je'Rod Cherry CB/S; 27 Victor Green FS; 23 Antwan Harris SS; 29 Chris Hayes FS; 34 Tebucky Jones FS; 24 Ty Law CB; 36 Lawyer Milloy SS; 25 Leonard Myers CB; Special teams (ST): 66 Lonie Paxton LS; 4 Adam Vinatieri K; 13 Ken Walter P	Practice squad: 75 Maurice Anderson DT; 28 Dyshod Carter CB; 76 Brandon Gorin T; 94 Ken Kocher DT; 16 Scott McCready WR; Reserve: 58 Matt Chatham LB (IR); 82 Daniel Graham TE (IR); 31 Ben Kelly CB (IR); 37 Rob Kelly S (IR); 61 Stephen Neal G (IR); 45 Otis Smith CB (IR); 42 Antwoine Womack RB (IR); Rookies in italics 53 active, 7 reserve, 5 practice squad

== Regular season ==
=== Schedule ===
Week	Date	Opponent	Result	Record	Venue	Recap
1	September 9	Pittsburgh Steelers	W 30–14	1–0	Gillette Stadium	Recap
2	September 15	at New York Jets	W 44–7	2–0	Giants Stadium	Recap
3	September 22	Kansas City Chiefs	W 41–38 (OT)	3–0	Gillette Stadium	Recap
4	September 29	at San Diego Chargers	L 14–21	3–1	Qualcomm Stadium	Recap
5	October 6	at Miami Dolphins	L 13–26	3–2	Pro Player Stadium	Recap
6	October 13	Green Bay Packers	L 10–28	3–3	Gillette Stadium	Recap
7	Bye					
8	October 27	Denver Broncos	L 16–24	3–4	Gillette Stadium	Recap
9	November 3	at Buffalo Bills	W 38–7	4–4	Ralph Wilson Stadium	Recap
10	November 10	at Chicago Bears	W 33–30	5–4	Memorial Stadium	Recap
11	November 17	at Oakland Raiders	L 20–27	5–5	Network Associates Coliseum	Recap
12	November 24	Minnesota Vikings	W 24–17	6–5	Gillette Stadium	Recap
13	November 28	at Detroit Lions	W 20–12	7–5	Ford Field	Recap
14	December 8	Buffalo Bills	W 27–17	8–5	Gillette Stadium	Recap
15	December 16	at Tennessee Titans	L 7–24	8–6	The Coliseum	Recap
16	December 22	New York Jets	L 17–30	8–7	Gillette Stadium	Recap
17	December 29	Miami Dolphins	W 27–24 (OT)	9–7	Gillette Stadium	Recap

=== Game summaries ===
==== Week 1: vs. Pittsburgh Steelers ====
Week 1: Pittsburgh Steelers (0–0) at New England Patriots (0–0) – Game summary

Quarter	1	2	3	4	Total
Steelers	7	0	0	7	14
Patriots	7	3	17	3	30

at Gillette Stadium, Foxborough, Massachusetts

- Date: September 9, 2002
- Game time: 9:00 p.m.
- Game weather: Overcast, 86 °F (30 °C)
- Game attendance: 68,436
- Referee: Tony Corrente (99)
- TV announcers (ABC): Al Michaels, John Madden and Melissa Stark
- Recap, Game Book

Game information

First quarter

- NE – Christian Fauria 4-yard pass from Tom Brady (Adam Vinatieri kick), 10:57. Patriots 7–0. Drive: 4 plays, 26 yards, 1:54.
- PIT – Hines Ward 13-yard pass from Kordell Stewart (Todd Peterson kick), 4:50. Tied 7–7. Drive: 10 plays, 74 yards, 6:07.

Second quarter

- NE – Adam Vinatieri 45-yard field goal, 2:23. Patriots 10–7. Drive: 9 plays, 44 yards, 3:11.

Third quarter

- NE – Donald Hayes 40-yard pass from Tom Brady (Adam Vinatieri kick), 13:27. Patriots 17–7. Drive: 4 plays, 74 yards, 1:33.
- NE – Deion Branch 22-yard pass from Tom Brady (Adam Vinatieri kick), 7:03. Patriots 24–7. Drive: 9 plays, 49 yards, 6:04.
- NE – Adam Vinatieri 28-yard field goal, 2:08. Patriots 27–7. Drive: 8 plays, 39 yards, 2:50.

Fourth quarter

- NE – Adam Vinatieri 27-yard field goal, 9:32. Patriots 30–7. Drive: 6 plays, 22 yards, 2:59.
- PIT – Kordell Stewart 1-yard run (Todd Peterson kick), 0:00. Patriots 30–14. Drive: 11 plays, 66 yards, 2:55.

Top passers

- PIT – Kordell Stewart – 24/37, 242 yards, TD, 3 INT
- NE – Tom Brady – 29/43, 294 yards, 3 TD

Top rushers

- PIT – Jerome Bettis – 8 rushes, 35 yards
- NE – Antowain Smith – 17 rushes, 60 yards

Top receivers

- PIT – Hines Ward – 8 receptions, 90 yards, TD
- NE – Deion Branch – 6 receptions, 83 yards, TD

==== Week 2: at New York Jets ====
Week 2: New England Patriots (1–0) at New York Jets (1–0) – Game summary

Quarter	1	2	3	4	Total
Patriots	0	10	17	17	44
Jets	0	0	7	0	7

at Giants Stadium, East Rutherford, New Jersey

- Date: September 15, 2002
- Game time: 1:00 p.m.
- Game weather: Hazy, 78 °F (26 °C)
- Game attendance: 78,726
- Referee: Larry Nemmers (20)
- TV announcers (CBS): Dick Enberg, Dan Dierdorf, and Bonnie Bernstein
- Recap, Game Book

Game information

First quarter

- No scoring plays.

Second quarter

- NE – Cam Cleeland 1-yard pass from Tom Brady (Adam Vinatieri kick), 9:00. Patriots 7–0. Drive: 6 plays, 80 yards, 3:06.
- NE – Adam Vinatieri 28-yard field goal, 0:05. Patriots 10–0. Drive: 19 plays, 70 yards, 6:40.

Third quarter

- NE – Tebucky Jones 24-yard fumble return (Adam Vinatieri kick), 13:15. Patriots 17–0.
- NE – Adam Vinatieri 31-yard field goal, 5:56. Patriots 20–0. Drive: 12 plays, 65 yards, 6:02.
- NE – Victor Green 90-yard interception return (Adam Vinatieri kick), 4:47. Patriots 27–0.
- NYJ – Anthony Becht 11-yard pass from Vinny Testaverde (John Hall kick), 0:57. Patriots 27–7. Drive: 4 plays, 69 yards, 1:53.

Fourth quarter

- NE – Deion Branch 49-yard pass from Tom Brady (Adam Vinatieri kick), 11:13. Patriots 34–7. Drive: 8 plays, 75 yards, 4:57.
- NE – Adam Vinatieri 40-yard field goal, 8:47. Patriots 37–7. Drive: 4 plays, 2 yards, 1:26.
- NE – Kevin Faulk 2-yard run (Adam Vinatieri kick), 3:22. Patriots 44–7. Drive: 7 plays, 37 yards, 4:35.

Top passers

- NE – Tom Brady – 25/35, 269 yards, 2 TD, INT
- NYJ – Vinny Testaverde – 15/23, 150 yards, TD, INT

Top rushers

- NE – Antowain Smith – 15 rushes, 66 yards
- NYJ – Matt Turk – 1 rush, 14 yards

Top receivers

- NE – Troy Brown – 9 receptions, 94 yards
- NYJ – Santana Moss – 1 reception, 35 yards

==== Week 3: vs. Kansas City Chiefs ====
Week 3: Kansas City Chiefs (1–1) at New England Patriots (2–0) – Game summary

Quarter	1	2	3	4	OT	Total
Chiefs	3	7	7	21	0	38
Patriots	0	9	8	21	3	41

at Gillette Stadium, Foxborough, Massachusetts

- Date: September 22, 2002
- Game time: 1:00 p.m.
- Game weather: Warm and humid, 80 °F (27 °C)
- Game attendance: 68,436
- Referee: Bill Carollo (63)
- TV announcers (CBS): Dick Enberg, Dan Dierdorf, and Bonnie Bernstein
- Recap, Game Book

Game information

First quarter

- KC – Morten Andersen 39-yard field goal, 2:15. Chiefs 3–0. Drive: 9 plays, 37 yards, 4:36.

Second quarter

- KC – Eddie Kennison 14-yard pass from Trent Green (Morten Andersen kick), 14:56. Chiefs 10–0. Drive: 3 plays, 26 yards, 0:47.
- NE – Kevin Faulk 23-yard pass from Tom Brady (run failed), 6:57. Chiefs 10–6. Drive: 8 plays, 85 yards, 4:40.
- NE – Adam Vinatieri 37-yard field goal, 0:05. Chiefs 10–9. Drive: 6 plays, 22 yards, 0:51.

Third quarter

- KC – Priest Holmes 3-yard pass from Trent Green (Morten Andersen kick), 13:00. Chiefs 17–9. Drive: 4 plays, 37 yards, 2:00.
- NE – Troy Brown 9-yard pass from Tom Brady (Antowain Smith run), 7:45. Tied 17–17. Drive: 11 plays, 71 yards, 5:15.

Fourth quarter

- NE – Daniel Graham 18-yard pass from Tom Brady (Adam Vinatieri kick), 14:55. Patriots 24–17. Drive: 4 plays, 56 yards, 1:08.
- NE – David Patten 38-yard pass from Tom Brady (Adam Vinatieri kick), 13:23. Patriots 31–17. Drive: 3 plays, 39 yards, 1:24.
- KC – Eddie Kennison 15-yard pass from Trent Green (Morten Andersen kick), 9:23. Patriots 31–24. Drive: 8 plays, 62 yards, 4:00.
- NE – Antowain Smith 42-yard run (Adam Vinatieri kick), 6:10. Patriots 38–24. Drive: 6 plays, 75 yards, 3:13.
- KC – Priest Holmes 6-yard run (Morten Andersen kick), 4:37. Patriots 38–31. Drive: 6 plays, 59 yards, 1:33.
- KC – Priest Holmes 1-yard run (Morten Anderson kick), 0:00. Tied 38–38. Drive: 11 plays, 54 yards, 2:30.

Overtime

- NE – Adam Vinatieri 35-yard field goal, 10:20. Patriots 41–38. Drive: 9 plays, 53 yards, 4:40.

Top passers

- KC – Trent Green – 16/25, 149 yards, 3 TD, 2 INT
- NE – Tom Brady – 39/54, 410 yards, 4 TD, INT

Top rushers

- KC – Priest Holmes – 30 rushes, 180 yards, 2 TD
- NE – Antowain Smith – 16 rushes, 92 yards, TD

Top receivers

- KC – Johnnie Morton – 2 receptions, 44 yards
- NE – Troy Brown – 16 receptions, 176 yards, TD

==== Week 4: at San Diego Chargers ====
Week 4: New England Patriots (3–0) at San Diego Chargers (3–0) – Game summary

Quarter	1	2	3	4	Total
Patriots	7	7	0	0	14
Chargers	7	7	7	0	21

at Qualcomm Stadium, San Diego, California

- Date: September 29, 2002
- Game time: 4:15 p.m.
- Game weather: Partly cloudy, 67 °F (19 °C)
- Game attendance: 66,463
- Referee: Ron Blum (7)
- TV announcers (CBS): Greg Gumbel, Phil Simms, and Armen Keteyian
- Recap, Game Book

Game information

First quarter

- NE – Christian Fauria 5-yard pass from Tom Brady (Adam Vinatieri kick), 9:26. Patriots 7–0. Drive: 11 plays, 67 yards, 5:34.
- SD – Curtis Conway 52-yard pass from Drew Brees (Steve Christie kick), 4:17. Tied 7–7. Drive: 5 plays, 87 yards, 2:33.

Second quarter

- NE – Mike Vrabel 1-yard pass from Tom Brady (Adam Vinatieri kick), 14:13. Patriots 14–7. Drive: 10 plays, 65 yards, 5:04.
- SD – LaDainian Tomlinson 37-yard run (Steve Christie kick), 2:19. Tied 14–14. Drive: 9 plays, 69 yards, 4:33.

Third quarter

- SD – LaDainian Tomlinson 58-yard run (Steve Christie kick), 14:14. Chargers 21–14. Drive: 2 plays, 67 yards, 0:46.

Top passers

- NE – Tom Brady – 36/53, 353 yards, 2 TD, 2 INT
- SD – Drew Brees – 10/18, 104 yards, TD

Top rushers

- NE – Antowain Smith – 16 rushes, 78 yards
- SD – LaDainian Tomlinson – 27 rushes, 217 yards, 2 TD

Top receivers

- NE – Deion Branch – 13 receptions, 128 yards
- SD – Curtis Conway – 3 receptions, 69 yards, TD

The loss ended the Patriots' 10-game winning streak against the Chargers, losing to them for the first time since the 1970 season. (Note: The Patriots and Chargers did not meet at all between 1984 and 1993 inclusive — an impossible occurrence in the pre-1978 or post-2002 NFL — because non-division conference matchups were entirely based on the previous season’s standings.)

==== Week 5: at Miami Dolphins ====
Week 5: New England Patriots (3–1) at Miami Dolphins (3–1) – Game summary

Quarter	1	2	3	4	Total
Patriots	0	0	6	7	13
Dolphins	6	10	7	3	26

at Pro Player Stadium, Miami Gardens, Florida

- Date: October 6, 2002
- Game time: 1:00 p.m.
- Game weather: Sunny, 87 °F (31 °C)
- Game attendance: 73,369
- Referee: Terry McAulay (77)
- TV announcers (CBS): Greg Gumbel, Phil Simms, and Armen Keteyian
- Recap, Game Book

Game information

First quarter

- MIA – Jay Fiedler 8-yard run (kick blocked), 0:08. Dolphins 6–0. Drive: 9 plays, 39 yards, 5:13.

Second quarter

- MIA – Chris Chambers 7-yard pass from Jay Fiedler (Olindo Mare kick), 11:38. Dolphins 13–0. Drive: 8 plays, 29 yards, 3:09.
- MIA – Olindo Mare 40-yard field goal, 1:11. Dolphins 16–0. Drive: 9 plays, 39 yards, 4:31.

Third quarter

- NE – David Patten 34-yard pass from Tom Brady (pass failed), 9:35. Dolphins 16–6. Drive: 5 plays, 68 yards, 1:35.
- MIA – Randy McMichael 1-yard pass from Jay Fiedler (Olindo Mare kick), 1:05. Dolphins 23–6. Drive: 10 plays, 74 yards, 5:29.

Fourth quarter

- NE – David Patten 25-yard pass from Tom Brady (Adam Vinatieri kick), 4:41. Dolphins 23–13. Drive: 8 plays, 80 yards, 2:58.
- MIA – Olindo Mare 33-yard field goal, 1:25. Dolphins 26–13. Drive: 8 plays, 27 yards, 3:16.

Top passers

- NE – Tom Brady – 17/31, 240 yards, 2 TD, 2 INT
- MIA – Jay Fiedler – 17/27, 190 yards, 2 TD

Top rushers

- NE – Kevin Faulk – 2 rushes, 17 yards
- MIA – Ricky Williams – 36 rushes, 105 yards

Top receivers

- NE – David Patten – 5 receptions, 102 yards, 2 TD
- MIA – Chris Chambers – 6 receptions, 62 yards, TD

==== Week 6: vs. Green Bay Packers ====
Week 6: Green Bay Packers (4–1) at New England Patriots (3–2) – Game summary

Quarter	1	2	3	4	Total
Packers	0	14	7	7	28
Patriots	0	3	0	7	10

at Gillette Stadium, Foxborough, Massachusetts

- Date: October 13, 2002
- Game time: 1:00 p.m.
- Game weather: Overcast, 61 °F (16 °C)
- Game attendance: 68,436
- Referee: Bernie Kukar (86)
- TV announcers (Fox): Dick Stockton, Troy Aikman, Cris Collinsworth, and Pam Oliver
- Recap, Game Book

Game information

Second quarter

- NE – Adam Vinatieri 32-yard field goal, 9:36. Patriots 3–0. Drive: 10 plays, 50 yards, 3:58.
- GB – William Henderson 3-yard pass from Brett Favre (Ryan Longwell kick), 3:46. Packers 7–3. Drive: 12 plays, 76 yards, 5:50.
- GB – Ahman Green 8-yard pass from Brett Favre (Ryan Longwell kick), 3:03. Packers 14–3. Drive: 1 play, 8 yards, 0:05.

Third quarter

- GB – Bubba Franks 2-yard pass from Brett Favre (Ryan Longwell kick), 3:50. Packers 21–3. Drive: 7 plays, 94 yards, 4:05.

Fourth quarter

- GB – Ahman Green 1-yard run (Ryan Longwell kick), 12:09. Packers 28–3. Drive: 7 plays, 65 yards, 4:16.
- NE – David Givens 4-yard pass from Tom Brady (Adam Vinatieri kick), 5:57. Packers 28–10. Drive: 6 plays, 44 yards, 2:03.

Top passers

- GB – Brett Favre – 17/27, 147 yards, 3 TD
- NE – Tom Brady – 24/44, 183 yards, TD, 3 INT

Top rushers

- GB – Ahman Green – 31 rushes, 136 yards, TD
- NE – Antowain Smith – 13 rushes, 75 yards

Top receivers

- GB – Bubba Franks – 5 receptions, 46 yards, TD
- NE – Deion Branch – 5 receptions, 38 yards

==== Week 8: vs. Denver Broncos ====
Week 8: Denver Broncos (5–2) at New England Patriots (3–3) – Game summary

Quarter	1	2	3	4	Total
Broncos	7	14	0	3	24
Patriots	0	7	3	6	16

at Gillette Stadium, Foxborough, Massachusetts

- Date: October 27, 2002
- Game time: 4:15 p.m.
- Game weather: Sunny, 60 °F (16 °C)
- Game attendance: 68,436
- Referee: Tom White (123)
- TV announcers (CBS): Greg Gumbel, Phil Simms, and Armen Keteyian
- Recap, Game Book

Game information

First quarter

- DEN – Clinton Portis 1-yard run (Jason Elam kick), 10:08. Broncos 7–0. Drive: 7 plays, 48 yards, 3:10.

Second quarter

- DEN – Shannon Sharpe 8-yard pass from Brian Griese (Jason Elam kick), 14:55. Broncos 14–0. Drive: 9 plays, 72 yards, 4:56.
- NE – Antowain Smith 3-yard run (Adam Vinatieri kick), 7:16. Broncos 14–7. Drive: 6 plays, 42 yards, 2:54.
- DEN – Clinton Portis 4-yard run (Jason Elam kick), 2:45. Broncos 21–7. Drive: 8 plays, 70 yards, 4:31.

Third quarter

- NE – Adam Vinatieri 26-yard field goal, 7:26. Broncos 21–10. Drive: 7 plays, 54 yards, 2:51.

Fourth quarter

- NE – Christian Fauria 8-yard pass from Tom Brady (pass failed), 14:55. Broncos 21–16. Drive: 4 plays, 35 yards, 1:07.
- DEN – Jason Elam 19-yard field goal, 9:45. Broncos 24–16. Drive: 11 plays, 67 yards, 5:10.

Top passers

- DEN – Brian Griese – 18/23, 229 yards, TD, INT
- NE – Tom Brady – 15/29, 130 yards, TD

Top rushers

- DEN – Clinton Portis – 26 rushes, 111 yards, 2 TD
- NE – Antowain Smith – 13 rushes, 58 yards, TD

Top receivers

- DEN – Ed McCaffrey – 8 receptions, 116 yards
- NE – Troy Brown – 7 receptions, 59 yards

==== Week 9: at Buffalo Bills ====
Week 9: New England Patriots (3–4) at Buffalo Bills (5–3) – Game summary

Quarter	1	2	3	4	Total
Patriots	7	10	14	7	38
Bills	0	7	0	0	7

at Ralph Wilson Stadium, Orchard Park, New York

- Date: November 3, 2002
- Game time: 1:00 p.m.
- Game weather: Cloudy, 37 °F (3 °C)
- Game attendance: 73,448
- Referee: Dick Hantak (105)
- TV announcers (CBS): Greg Gumbel, Phil Simms and Armen Keteyian
- Recap, Game Book

Game information

First quarter

- NE – Christian Fauria 5-yard pass from Tom Brady (Adam Vinatieri kick), 10:27. Patriots 7–0. Drive: 8 plays, 68 yards, 4:33.

Second quarter

- NE – Antowain Smith 13-yard pass from Tom Brady (Adam Vinatieri kick), 12:54. Patriots 14–0. Drive: 8 plays, 57 yards, 4:49.
- NE – Adam Vinatieri 46-yard field goal, 3:49. Patriots 17–0. Drive: 9 plays, 52 yards, 3:48.
- BUF – Peerless Price 1-yard pass from Drew Bledsoe (Mike Hollis kick), 0:10. Patriots 17–7. Drive: 16 plays, 80 yards, 3:39.

Third quarter

- NE – Kevin Faulk 45-yard run (Adam Vinatieri kick), 7:33. Patriots 24–7. Drive: 8 plays, 83 yards, 4:08.
- NE – Antowain Smith 2-yard run (Adam Vinatieri kick), 0:54. Patriots 31–7. Drive: 11 plays, 76 yards, 5:28.

Fourth quarter

- NE – Antowain Smith 14-yard pass from Tom Brady (Adam Vinatieri kick), 6:52. Patriots 38–7. Drive: 9 plays, 64 yards, 5:09.

Top passers

- NE – Tom Brady – 22/26, 265 yards, 3 TD
- BUF – Drew Bledsoe – 28/45, 302 yards, TD, INT

Top rushers

- NE – Antowain Smith – 29 rushes, 111 yards, TD
- BUF – Travis Henry – 11 rushes, 53 yards

Top receivers

- NE – David Patten – 6 receptions, 88 yards
- BUF – Peerless Price – 9 receptions, 98 yards, TD

==== Week 10: at Chicago Bears ====
Week 10: New England Patriots (4–4) at Chicago Bears (2–6) – Game summary

Quarter	1	2	3	4	Total
Patriots	0	6	10	17	33
Bears	0	6	21	3	30

at Memorial Stadium, Champaign, Illinois

- Date: November 10, 2002
- Game time: 4:15 p.m.
- Game weather: Overcast, 60 °F (16 °C)
- Game attendance: 63,105
- Referee: Bob McElwee (95)
- TV announcers (CBS): Kevin Harlan, Randy Cross, and Beasley Reece
- Recap, Game Book

Game information

First quarter

- No scoring plays.

Second quarter

- CHI – Paul Edinger 39-yard field goal, 14:51. Bears 3–0. Drive: 13 plays, 46 yards, 7:14.
- NE – Adam Vinatieri 57-yard field goal, 10:15. Tied 3–3. Drive: 10 plays, 31 yards, 4:36.
- CHI – Paul Edinger 40-yard field goal, 5:31. Bears 6–3. Drive: 9 plays, 46 yards, 4:44.
- NE – Adam Vinatieri 31-yard field goal, 0:04. Tied 6–6. Drive: 7 plays, 55 yards, 1:24.

Third quarter

- CHI – Stanley Pritchett 11-yard pass from Jim Miller (Paul Edinger kick), 12:21. Bears 13–6. Drive: 2 plays, 14 yards, 0:40.
- CHI – Marcus Robinson 44-yard pass from Marty Booker (Paul Edinger kick), 10:09. Bears 20–6. Drive: 1 play, 44 yards, 0:09.
- CHI – Anthony Thomas 2-yard run (Paul Edinger kick), 6:42. Bears 27–6. Drive: 3 plays, 36 yards, 0:37.
- NE – Kevin Faulk 15-yard pass from Tom Brady (Adam Vinatieri kick), 3:04. Bears 27–13. Drive: 8 plays, 75 yards, 3:38.
- NE – Adam Vinatieri 42–yard field goal, 1:50. Bears 27–16. Drive: 4 plays, 2 yards, 0:58.

Fourth quarter

- NE – Adam Vinatieri 25-yard field goal, 11:02. Bears 27–19. Drive: 16 plays, 54 yards, 4:44.
- CHI – Paul Edinger 32-yard field goal, 5:22. Bears 30–19. Drive: 9 plays, 38 yards, 5:40.
- NE – Kevin Faulk 36-yard pass from Tom Brady (run failed), 2:46. Bears 30–25. Drive: 7 plays, 63 yards, 2:16.
- NE – David Patten 20-yard pass from Tom Brady (Tom Brady–Troy Brown pass), 0:21. Patriots 33–30. Drive: 8 plays, 56 yards, 1:29.

Top passers

- NE – Tom Brady – 36/55, 328 yards, 3 TD, INT
- CHI – Jim Miller – 8/18, 72 yards, TD, INT

Top rushers

- NE – Antowain Smith – 10 rushes, 41 yards
- CHI – Anthony Thomas – 21 rushes, 99 yards, TD

Top receivers

- NE – Kevin Faulk – 7 receptions, 109 yards, 2 TD
- CHI – Marty Booker – 4 receptions, 65 yards

With the comeback win, the Patriots defeated Chicago and improved to 5-4.

==== Week 11: at Oakland Raiders ====
Week 11: New England Patriots (5–4) at Oakland Raiders (5–4) – Game summary

Quarter	1	2	3	4	Total
Patriots	3	3	7	7	20
Raiders	3	14	7	3	27

at Network Associates Coliseum, Oakland, California

- Date: November 17, 2002
- Game time: 8:30 p.m.
- Game weather: Clear, 61 °F (16 °C)
- Game attendance: 62,552
- Referee: Ed Hochuli (85)
- TV announcers (ESPN): Mike Patrick, Paul Maguire, Joe Theismann, and Suzy Kolber
- Recap, Game Book

Game information

First quarter

- NE – Adam Vinatieri 36-yard field goal, 9:09. Patriots 3–0. Drive: 11 plays, 41 yards, 5:51.
- OAK – Sebastian Janikowski 39-yard field goal, 0:51. Tied 3–3. Drive: 10 plays, 54 yards, 4:13.

Second quarter

- OAK – Zack Crockett 2-yard run (Sebastian Janikowski kick), 9:58. Raiders 10–3. Drive: 10 plays, 63 yards, 5:02.
- NE – Adam Vinatieri 31-yard field goal, 4:16. Raiders 10–6. Drive: 13 plays, 59 yards, 5:42.
- OAK – Rich Gannon 2-yard run (Sebastian Janikowski kick), 0:52. Raiders 17–6. Drive: 2 plays, 8 yards, 0:44.

Third quarter

- OAK – Zack Crockett 2-yard run (Sebastian Janikowski kick), 5:18. Raiders 24–6. Drive: 15 plays, 85 yards, 9:42.
- NE – Tedy Bruschi 48-yard interception return (Adam Vinatieri kick), 1:27. Raiders 24–13.

Fourth quarter

- OAK – Sebastian Janikowski 28-yard field goal, 1:13. Raiders 27–13. Drive: 7 plays, 34 yards, 2:28.
- NE – Kevin Faulk 86-yard kickoff return (Adam Vinatieri kick), 0:59. Raiders 27–20. Drive: 0 plays, 0 yards, 0:14.

Top passers

- NE – Tom Brady – 18/30, 172 yards
- OAK – Rich Gannon – 26/38, 297 yards, INT

Top rushers

- NE – Antowain Smith – 15 rushes, 49 yards
- OAK – Charlie Garner – 15 rushes, 57 yards

Top receivers

- NE – Troy Brown – 5 receptions, 55 yards
- OAK – Tim Brown – 5 receptions, 71 yards

With the loss, the Patriots fell to 5-5 and finished 1-3 against the AFC West.

==== Week 12: vs. Minnesota Vikings ====
Week 12: Minnesota Vikings (3–7) at New England Patriots (5–5) – Game summary

Quarter	1	2	3	4	Total
Vikings	0	7	7	3	17
Patriots	7	14	0	3	24

at Gillette Stadium, Foxborough, Massachusetts

- Date: November 24, 2002
- Game time: 1:00 pm
- Game weather: Partly cloudy, 49 °F (9 °C)
- Game attendance: 68,436
- Referee: Gerald Austin (34)
- TV announcers (FOX): Kenny Albert, Tim Green, and Rob Nikoleski
- Recap, Game Book

Game information

First quarter

- NE – Christian Fauria 9-yard pass from Tom Brady (Adam Vinatieri kick), 3:24. Patriots 7–0. Drive: 12 plays, 67 yards, 5:40.

Second quarter

- NE – Christian Fauria 1-yard pass from Tom Brady (Adam Vinatieri kick), 12:30. Patriots 14–0. Drive: 8 plays, 56 yards, 3:20.
- NE – Troy Brown 5-yard pass from Tom Brady (Adam Vinatieri kick), 8:02. Patriots 21–0. Drive: 7 plays, 29 yards, 4:01.
- MIN – D'Wayne Bates 6-yard pass from Daunte Culpepper (Gary Anderson kick), 0:19. Patriots 21–7. Drive: 5 plays, 61 yards, 0:50.

Third quarter

- MIN – Kelly Campbell 7-yard pass from Daunte Culpepper (Gary Anderson kick), 4:45. Patriots 21–14. Drive: 7 plays, 44 yards, 3:19.

Fourth quarter

- MIN – Gary Anderson 38-yard field goal, 14:42. Patriots 21–17. Drive: 9 plays, 56 yards, 3:16.
- NE – Adam Vinatieri 34-yard field goal, 11:09. Patriots 24–17. Drive: 7 plays, 56 yards, 3:33.

Top passers

- MIN – Daunte Culpepper – 24/49, 272 yards, 2 TD
- NE – Tom Brady – 21/34, 239 yards, 3 TD

Top rushers

- MIN – Daunte Culpepper – 5 rushes, 59 yards
- NE – Antowain Smith – 18 rushes, 58 yards

Top receivers

- MIN – Randy Moss – 8 receptions, 92 yards
- NE – David Patten – 5 receptions, 62 yards

==== Week 13: at Detroit Lions ====
Week 13: New England Patriots (6–5) at Detroit Lions (3–8) – Game summary

Quarter	1	2	3	4	Total
Patriots	10	7	0	3	20
Lions	3	3	3	3	12

at Ford Field, Detroit, Michigan

- Date: November 28, 2002
- Game time: 12:30 pm
- Game weather: none (indoor stadium)
- Game attendance: 62,109
- Referee: Larry Nemmers (20)
- TV announcers (CBS): Greg Gumbel, Phil Simms, and Armen Keteyian
- Recap, Game Book

Game information

First quarter

- NE – Adam Vinatieri 31-yard field goal, 10:06. Patriots 3–0. Drive: 10 plays, 62 yards, 4:54.
- NE – Tedy Bruschi 27-yard interception return (Adam Vinatieri kick), 9:44. Patriots 10–0.
- DET – Jason Hanson 23-yard field goal, 0:08. Patriots 10–3. Drive: 12 plays, 77 yards, 6:04.

Second quarter

- NE – Antowain Smith 1-yard run (Adam Vinatieri kick), 2:24. Patriots 17–3. Drive: 4 plays, 19 yards, 1:42.
- DET – Jason Hanson 45-yard field goal, 0:30. Patriots 17–6. Drive: 11 plays, 53 yards, 1:54.

Third quarter

- DET – Jason Hanson 39-yard field goal, 4:12. Patriots 17–9. Drive: 13 plays, 64 yards, 5:51.

Fourth quarter

- NE – Adam Vinatieri 29-yard field goal, 13:17. Patriots 20–9. Drive: 12 plays, 64 yards, 5:55.
- DET – Jason Hanson 46-yard field goal, 9:46. Patriots 20–12. Drive: 9 plays, 33 yards, 3:31.

Top passers

- NE – Tom Brady – 18/30, 210 yards, INT
- DET – Joey Harrington – 22/44, 210 yards, 3 INT

Top rushers

- NE – Antowain Smith – 25 rushes, 80 yards, TD
- DET – James Stewart – 13 rushes, 57 yards

Top receivers

- NE – Troy Brown – 10 receptions, 111 yards
- DET – Germane Crowell – 5 receptions, 46 yards

With the win, the Patriots improved to 7-5 and finished 3-1 against the NFC North.

==== Week 14: vs. Buffalo Bills ====
Week 14: Buffalo Bills (6–6) at New England Patriots (7–5) – Game summary

Quarter	1	2	3	4	Total
Bills	0	0	10	7	17
Patriots	17	3	0	7	27

at Gillette Stadium, Foxborough, Massachusetts

- Date: December 8, 2002
- Game time: 1:00 pm
- Game weather: Partly cloudy, 44 °F (7 °C)
- Game attendance: 68,436
- Referee: Jeff Triplette (42)
- TV announcers (CBS): Greg Gumbel, Phil Simms and Armen Keteyian
- Recap, Game Book

Game information

First quarter

- NE – Adam Vinatieri 39-yard field goal, 11:16. Patriots 3–0. Drive: 7 plays, 42 yards, 3:44.
- NE – David Patten 10-yard pass from Tom Brady (Adam Vinatieri kick), 3:35. Patriots 10–0. Drive: 8 plays, 86 yards, 4:31.
- NE – Donald Hayes 9-yard pass from Tom Brady (Adam Vinatieri kick), 3:14. Patriots 17–0. Drive: 2 plays, 9 yards, 0:08.

Second quarter

- NE – Adam Vinatieri 46-yard field goal, 2:31. Patriots 20–0. Drive: 12 plays, 52 yards, 7:49.

Third quarter

- BUF – Mike Hollis 26-yard field goal, 7:46. Patriots 20–3. 13 plays, 72 yards, 7:14.
- BUF – Eric Moulds 12-yard pass from Drew Bledsoe (Mike Hollis kick), 4:15. Patriots 20–10. Drive: 6 plays, 59 yards, 1:53.

Fourth quarter

- NE – Antowain Smith 4-yard run (Adam Vinatieri kick), 10:06. Patriots 27–10. Drive: 7 plays, 28 yards, 3:17.
- BUF – Eric Moulds 4-yard pass from Drew Bledsoe (Mike Hollis kick), 1:05. Patriots 27–17. Drive: 18 plays, 88 yards, 4:43.

Top passers

- BUF – Drew Bledsoe – 32/51, 328 yards, 2 TD, 4 INT
- NE – Tom Brady – 15/27, 183 yards, 2 TD

Top rushers

- BUF – Travis Henry – 15 rushes, 60 yards
- NE – Antowain Smith – 17 rushes, 68 yards, TD

Top receivers

- BUF – Peerless Price – 9 receptions, 105 yards
- NE – Deion Branch – 1 reception, 41 yards

==== Week 15: at Tennessee Titans ====
Week 15: New England Patriots (8–5) at Tennessee Titans (8–5) – Game summary

Quarter	1	2	3	4	Total
Patriots	0	0	7	0	7
Titans	0	14	7	3	24

at The Coliseum, Nashville, Tennessee

- Date: December 16, 2002
- Game time: 9:00 pm
- Game weather: Cloudy, 57 °F (14 °C)
- Game attendance: 68,809
- Referee: Ron Winter (14)
- TV announcers (ABC): Al Michaels, John Madden, and Melissa Stark
- Recap, Game Book

Game information

Second quarter

- TEN – Steve McNair 11-yard run (Joe Nedney kick), 12:16. Titans 7–0. Drive: 12 plays, 78 yards, 6:18.
- TEN – Steve McNair 1-yard run (Joe Nedney kick), 0:32. Titans 14–0. Drive: 12 plays, 58 yards, 6:48.

Third quarter

- NE – Tom Brady 10-yard run (Adam Vinatieri kick), 13:08. Titans 14–7. Drive: 6 plays, 69 yards, 1:52.
- TEN – Rich Coady 24-yard interception return (Joe Nedney kick), 9:58. Titans 21–7.

Fourth quarter

- TEN – Joe Nedney 28-yard field goal, 9:22. Titans 24–7. Drive: 15 plays, 69 yards, 9:24.

Top passers

- NE – Tom Brady – 14/29, 134 yards, INT
- TEN – Steve McNair – 11/24, 136 yards, INT

Top rushers

- NE – Antowain Smith – 6 rushes, 31 yards
- TEN – Eddie George – 31 rushes, 101 yards

Top receivers

- NE – Troy Brown – 8 receptions, 73 yards
- TEN – Derrick Mason – 6 receptions, 86 yards

With the humiliating loss, the Patriots fell to 8-6 and finished 4-4 on the road.

==== Week 16: vs. New York Jets ====
Week 16: New York Jets (7–7) at New England Patriots (8–6) – Game summary

Quarter	1	2	3	4	Total
Jets	14	3	3	10	30
Patriots	7	3	7	0	17

at Gillette Stadium, Foxboro, Massachusetts

- Date: December 22, 2002
- Game time: 8:30 p.m.
- Game weather: Partly cloudy, 40 °F (4 °C)
- Game attendance: 68,436
- Referee: Tony Corrente (99)
- TV announcers (ESPN): Mike Patrick, Paul Maguire, Joe Theismann, and Suzy Kolber
- Recap, Game Book

Game information

First quarter

- NYJ – Laveranues Coles 32-yard pass from Chad Pennington (John Hall kick), 10:22. Jets 7–0. Drive: 3 plays, 43 yards, 1:05.
- NE – Kevin Faulk 87-yard kickoff return (Adam Vinatieri kick), 9:47. Tied 7–7. Drive: 0 plays, 0 yards, 0:14.
- NYJ – Santana Moss 11-yard pass from Chad Pennington (John Hall kick), 3:34. Jets 14–7. Drive: 5 plays, 74 yards, 2:25.

Second quarter

- NE – Adam Vinatieri 49-yard field goal, 10:20. Jets 14–10. Drive: 5 plays, 14 yards, 1:41.
- NYJ – John Hall 39-yard field goal, 4:35. Jets 17–10. Drive: 12 plays, 50 yards, 5:25.

Third quarter

- NE – Christian Fauria 6-yard pass from Tom Brady (Adam Vinatieri kick), 6:25. Tied 17–17. Drive: 16 plays, 66 yards, 8:41.
- NYJ – John Hall 23-yard field goal, 1:54. Jets 20–17. Drive: 6 plays, 14 yards, 2:10.

Fourth quarter

- NYJ – Wayne Chrebet 15-yard pass from Chad Pennington (John Hall kick), 9:30. Jets 27–17. Drive: 9 plays, 74 yards, 6:07.
- NYJ – John Hall 43-yard field goal, 2:36. Jets 30–17. Drive: 11 plays, 47 yards, 4:55.

Top passers

- NYJ – Chad Pennington – 23/33, 285 yards, 3 TD
- NE – Tom Brady – 19/37, 133 yards, TD, INT

Top rushers

- NYJ – Curtis Martin – 26 rushes, 106 yards
- NE – Antowain Smith – 14 rushes, 46 yards

Top receivers

- NYJ – Laveranues Coles – 5 receptions, 78 yards, TD
- NE – David Patten – 5 receptions, 38 yards

==== Week 17: vs. Miami Dolphins ====
Week 17: Miami Dolphins (9–6) at New England Patriots (8–7) – Game summary

Quarter	1	2	3	4	OT	Total
Dolphins	7	14	0	3	0	24
Patriots	0	10	3	11	3	27

at Gillette Stadium, Foxborough, Massachusetts

- Date: December 29, 2002
- Game time: 1:00 p.m.
- Game weather: Partly cloudy, 40 °F (4 °C)
- Game attendance: 68,436
- Referee: Bob McElwee (95)
- TV announcers (CBS): Greg Gumbel, Phil Simms, and Armen Keteyian
- Recap, Game Book

Game information

First quarter

- MIA – Ricky Williams 8-yard run (Olindo Mare kick), 3:17. Dolphins 7–0. Drive: 3 plays, 64 yards, 1:08.

Second quarter

- MIA – Ricky Williams 14-yard run (Olindo Mare kick), 8:52. Dolphins 14–0. Drive: 9 plays, 87 yards, 5:13.
- NE – Antowain Smith 11-yard run (Adam Vinatieri kick), 2:25. Dolphins 14–7. Drive: 7 plays, 58 yards, 3:00.
- MIA – James McKnight 32-yard pass from Jay Fiedler (Olindo Mare kick), 1:06. Dolphins 21–7. Drive: 6 plays, 76 yards, 1:19.
- NE – Adam Vinatieri 41-yard field goal, 0:00. Dolphins 21–10. Drive: 7 plays, 47 yards, 1:06.

Third quarter

- NE – Adam Vinatieri 36-yard field goal, 3:37. Dolphins 21–13. Drive: 11 plays, 45 yards, 5:03.

Fourth quarter

- MIA – Olindo Mare 28-yard field goal, 4:59. Dolphins 24–13. Drive: 6 plays, 21 yards, 2:58.
- NE – Troy Brown 3-yard pass from Tom Brady (Tom Brady–Christian Fauria pass), 2:46. Dolphins 24–21. Drive: 10 plays, 68 yards, 2:13.
- NE – Adam Vinatieri 43-yard field goal, 1:09. Tied 24–24. Drive: 4 plays, 9 yards, 1:02.

Overtime

- NE – Adam Vinatieri 35-yard field goal, 12:57. Patriots 27–24. Drive: 7 plays, 43 yards, 2:03.

Top passers

- MIA – Jay Fiedler – 11/25, 110 yards, TD
- NE – Tom Brady – 25/44, 221 yards, TD, INT

Top rushers

- MIA – Ricky Williams – 31 rushes, 185 yards, 2 TD
- NE – Antowain Smith – 19 rushes, 55 yards, TD

Top receivers

- MIA – Dedric Ward – 4 receptions, 34 yards
- NE – Kevin Faulk – 9 receptions, 70 yards

With the overtime victory, the Patriots eliminated the Dolphins from playoff contention and they would both finish the regular season at 9-7. Unfortunately for New England, the Jets' 42-17 win over Green Bay prevented the Pats from clinching the AFC East and eliminated them from playoff contention. This remains only season the Patriots missed the playoffs following a Super Bowl victory. This would also be the last time the Patriots both failed to clinch the AFC East and a playoff berth until 2008. New England ended the season 4-2 against the AFC East and 4-4 at home.

== Standings ==
AFC East
	W	L	T	PCT	DIV	CONF	PF	PA	STK
^{(4)} New York Jets	9	7	0	.563	4–2	6–6	359	336	W2
New England Patriots	9	7	0	.563	4–2	6–6	381	346	W1
Miami Dolphins	9	7	0	.563	2–4	7–5	378	301	L2
Buffalo Bills	8	8	0	.500	2–4	5–7	379	397	W1
