= Chris Hudson (American football) =

American football player (born 1971)

No. 20, 37, 47
- Position: Safety

Personal information
- Born: October 6, 1971 (age 55); Houston, Texas, U.S.
- Listed height: 5 ft 10 in (1.78 m)
- Listed weight: 199 lb (90 kg)

Career information
- High school: Worthing (Houston)
- College: Colorado
- NFL draft: 1995: 3rd round, 71st overall pick

Career history
- Jacksonville Jaguars (1995–1998); Chicago Bears (1999); Atlanta Falcons (2001)

Awards and highlights
- Jim Thorpe Award (1994); Consensus All-American (1994); Third-team All-American (1993); 2× First-team All-Big Eight (1993, 1994)

Career NFL statistics
- Tackles: 81
- Interceptions: 11
- Fumble recoveries: 5
- Touchdowns: 2
- Stats at Pro Football Reference
- College Football Hall of Fame

Christopher Reshard Hudson (born October 6, 1971) is an American former professional football player who was a safety for seven seasons in the National Football League (NFL) during the 1990s and early 2000s. Hudson played college football for the Colorado Buffaloes, earning consensus All-American honors in 1994. A third-round pick of the Jacksonville Jaguars in the 1995 NFL draft, he also played professionally for the Chicago Bears and Atlanta Falcons of the NFL.

== Early life ==
Hudson was born in Houston, Texas. He attended Worthing High School in Houston, and played high school football for the Worthing Colts.

== College career ==
While attending the University of Colorado at Boulder, Hudson played for the Colorado Buffaloes football team from 1991 to 1994. He was a versatile defensive back who could play any position in the backfield and play it well. As senior in 1994, he was recognized as a consensus first-team All-American and won the Jim Thorpe Award awarded annually to the best college defensive back in the nation. He finished his college career with the second-most interceptions in Buffaloes team history, and fifth on the team's all-time list for pass deflections.

On January 14, 2026, Hudson was inducted into the College Football Hall of Fame.

== Professional career ==
The Jacksonville Jaguars selected Hudson in the third round (71st pick overall) of the 1995 NFL draft. He played for the Jaguars from 1995 to 1998. He also was a member of the Chicago Bears in 1999, and after a year off in 2000, returned to the NFL in 2001 with the Atlanta Falcons. During his six his seasons in the NFL, he played in 77 regular season games, started in 63 of them, and compiled 11 interceptions.
