= Rick Lyle =

American football player and coach (born 1971)

No. 95, 96
- Position: Defensive end

Personal information
- Born: February 26, 1971 (age 55); Monroe, Louisiana, U.S.
- Listed height: 6 ft 5 in (1.96 m)
- Listed weight: 285 lb (129 kg)

Career information
- High school: Hickman Mills (Kansas City, Missouri)
- College: Missouri
- NFL draft: 1994: undrafted

Career history
- Cleveland Browns (1994–1995); Baltimore Ravens (1996); New York Jets (1997–2001); New England Patriots (2002–2003)

Awards and highlights
- Super Bowl champion (XXXVIII); 2× Second-team All-Big Eight (1992, 1993)

Career NFL statistics
- Tackles: 262
- Sacks: 11
- Fumble recoveries: 2
- Stats at Pro Football Reference

Rick Lyle (born February 26, 1971) is an American former professional football player who was a defensive end who played for nine seasons with four teams in the National Football League (NFL). He played college football for the Missouri Tigers.

== Early life ==
Lyle attended Hickman Mills High School in Kansas City, Missouri, where he was All State in wrestling, finishing fifth in state his senior year. He was also the two-time State Champion in the shot put during his junior and senior years, winning by over five feet beyond his closest competitor his senior year. He won many city, metro and state honors in football, including honorable mention USA Today All-American.

== College career ==
Rick Lyle was named Freshman All-American at the University of Missouri his redshirt freshman season and was honorable mention all Big Eight his junior and senior years. At his graduation, Rick held the University of Missouri career record for quarterback sacks. Lyle was in the top five all time at MU in the five weight lifts used to judge overall strength and was the top lifter in their history at that time in the Power Clean. He was also indoor champion in the shot put and eventually became an outdoor All-American in the shot put, and also held several University of Missouri records. Rick will be inducted into the University of Missouri Athletic Hall of Fame in January.

== NFL career ==
Lyle signed a free agent contract with the Cleveland Browns under Bill Belichick as head coach after graduation from Missouri. He stayed with them through two years, although he missed the second year after a training camp injury required surgery. He then moved with the team to Baltimore, where he played as a Raven for one year. The next five years were with the New York Jets, under Bill Parcells and Bill Belichick and later Herman Edwards. During his time there, he started 67 consecutive regular season and playoff games, including the 1998 Jets versus Broncos American Conference Championship Game. Lyle's last two seasons in the NFL were with the New England Patriots, once again with Belichick, as he was with the Browns and the Jets. His last game was Super Bowl XXXVIII, the Patriots' win over the Carolina Panthers.

=== NFL statistics ===
Year	Team	Games	Combined tackles	Solo Tackles	Assisted tackles	Sacks	Forced fumbles	Fumble recoveries
1994	CLE	3	2	2	0	0.0	0	0
1996	BAL	11	7	6	1	1.0	0	0
1997	NYJ	16	42	30	12	3.0	0	1
1998	NYJ	16	40	28	12	1.5	1	0
1999	NYJ	16	45	27	18	1.0	0	0
2000	NYJ	14	46	38	8	1.0	1	0
2001	NYJ	16	40	27	13	3.5	0	1
2002	NE	13	19	13	6	0.0	0	0
2003	NE	8	9	6	3	0.0	0	0
Career		113	250	177	73	11.0	2	2

== Post NFL life ==
After his retirement from the NFL, Lyle and his family moved to the St. Louis area where he worked as an assistant coach at Marquette High School, a local high school. In 2006, Eric Mangini asked Rick to join his new staff when he became head coach of the New York Jets. Lyle served as an assistant strength and conditioning coach and was responsible as well to see that the team's food, both at their facilities and on the road, was prepared and served properly, and especially, safely.

Rick is married to the former Laura Horstmeyer and has two daughters, Haley and Audrey. He and his family are currently living near the Jets' facilities in New Jersey. They will move to Ohio to work for the Browns once again in June 2009.

He is currently the strength and conditioning coach for Westlake High School in Ohio.
