= Ted Johnson =

American football player (born 1972)

No. 52
- Position: Linebacker

Personal information
- Born: December 4, 1972 (age 53); Alameda, California, U.S.
- Listed height: 6 ft 4 in (1.93 m)
- Listed weight: 253 lb (115 kg)

Career information
- High school: Carlsbad (Carlsbad, California)
- College: Colorado (1991–1994)
- NFL draft: 1995: 2nd round, 57th overall pick

Career history
- New England Patriots (1995–2004)

Awards and highlights
- 3× Super Bowl champion (XXXVI, XXXVIII, XXXIX); PFWA All-Rookie Team (1995); New England Patriots All-1990s Team; First-team All-Big Eight (1994); Second-team All-Big Eight (1993)

Career NFL statistics
- Tackles: 763
- Sacks: 11.5
- Interceptions: 1
- Stats at Pro Football Reference

Ted Curtis Johnson (born December 4, 1972) is an American former professional football player who was a linebacker for the New England Patriots of the National Football League (NFL). He grew up in Carlsbad, California where he graduated from Carlsbad High School in 1991. He played college football for the Colorado Buffaloes and was selected by the Patriots in the second round of the 1995 NFL draft with the 57th overall pick.

== Playing career ==
Pre-draft measurables
Height	Weight	Arm length	Hand span	40-yard dash	10-yard split	20-yard split	20-yard shuttle	Vertical jump	Broad jump	Bench press
6 ft 3 3/8 in (1.91 m)	248 lb (112 kg)	32 1/2 in (0.83 m)	9 1/4 in (0.23 m)	4.84 s	1.66 s	2.78 s	4.35 s	31.5 in (0.80 m)	10 ft 1 in (3.07 m)	28 reps
All values from NFL Combine

In his ten-year professional career, Johnson played in 125 regular season games and recorded 763 tackles, 11.5 sacks, one interception, 16 passes defensed, six forced fumbles, and seven fumble recoveries. He was noted for his ability to generate many tackles and for his smart play at the linebacker position. He also was able to make an impact for the Patriots without tackling the ballcarrier, as former Fox Network analyst and NFL player Matt Millen states, "What you didn't see is Ted Johnson stoning the guard, getting off the guard, taking on the fullback and freeing up (Todd) Collins to make the tackle. That play does not get made except for Ted Johnson."

Johnson retired before the 2005 NFL season after sustaining many documented and undocumented concussions during his career.

=== Career statistics ===
Year	Team	GP	Tackles					Fumbles			Interceptions					
Year	Team	GP	Comb	Solo	Ast	Sack	STF	FF	FR	Yds	Int	Yds	Avg	Long	TD	PD
1995	NE	12	71	41	30	0.5	0	0	2	0	0	0	0	0	0	1
1996	NE	16	114	86	28	0.0	0	1	1	0	1	0	0	0	0	4
1997	NE	16	127	95	32	4.0	0	1	0	0	0	0	0	0	0	1
1998	NE	13	95	65	30	2.0	0	0	0	0	0	0	0	0	0	4
1999	NE	5	38	25	13	2.0	0	1	0	0	0	0	0	0	0	0
2000	NE	13	73	50	23	0.5	0	0	3	0	0	0	0	0	0	1
2001	NE	12	45	32	13	0.0	2	1	1	0	0	0	0	0	0	4
2002	NE	14	96	62	34	1.5	3	1	0	0	0	0	0	0	0	1
2003	NE	8	21	15	6	0.0	1	0	0	0	0	0	0	0	0	0
2004	NE	16	77	55	22	1.0	2	1	0	0	0	0	0	0	0	1
Total	Total	125	757	526	231	11.5	8	6	7	0	1	0	0	0	0	17

== Post-playing career ==
In an interview with USA Today in 2005, Johnson indicated he would know the opposing team's private signals or audibles prior to the game in order to have a competitive advantage. He claims that he never knew the source of the confidential information.

Every now and then I'd get a sheet, one hour before the game, with a list of audibles for our opponent. I don't know how, but they just showed up."

— Ted Johnson (November 2005),

On February 1, 2007, Johnson told the New York Times that he suffers from amphetamine addiction, depression and headaches related to post-concussion syndrome and Second Impact Syndrome. He placed some blame on his former coach Bill Belichick for pressuring him to participate in full contact practice drills three days after suffering a concussion in an exhibition game against the New York Giants in August 2002. Johnson reported that during the drills, he suffered a second concussion, and he argues that Belichick asked him to participate against the advice of the team's head trainer. Belichick denies these allegations. Some thought Johnson's revelation was suspect based upon a December 20, 2006 column in the Boston Herald where columnist Michael Felger said Johnson told him that he would have considered playing for the Patriots in 2006 had they asked (in the wake of a season-ending injury to linebacker Junior Seau). However, in a February 14, 2007 interview on the Dennis and Callahan Show on WEEI, Johnson claimed he wasn't being serious when he said that, and in fact stated he said it sarcastically.

On January 28, 2009, he discussed his problems with concussions sustained during his pro football career and the impact it had on his life in a CNN article. He indicated he was very inactive for two years following his retirement, barely leaving the house, and described those as bad days. He described himself as still occasionally suffering from anger, depression, and throbbing headaches. The implication was that he had since improved; however, no details were provided.

== Personal ==
Johnson served as an adjunct professor for two years at Suffolk University in the Boston area. In 1984, Ted Johnson Sr., his father, and Sylvia Johnson, his stepmother, opened The Original Rib Tickler barbecue restaurant in Tomball, TX. He currently resides in Massachusetts with his longtime girlfriend.

== Sports radio ==
Johnson spent the 2005 season as a football analyst for Boston television station WBZ-TV, but resigned from the station in 2006.

Johnson served as a co-host of "The Triple Threat" afternoon show on KILT (SportsRadio 610) in Houston. During his radio sports talk show on March 21, 2013, he was asked who was the ugliest wife in the NFL. He named Bianca Wilfork, wife of his former teammate Vince Wilfork. After receiving widespread criticism for his comment, including from Wilfork, Johnson issued an apology. Johnson left the Triple Threat and SportsRadio 610 in summer 2018 to return to the northeastern US.

In December 2018, 98.5 The Sports Hub in Boston hired Johnson.

In January 2025, WEEI hired Johnson to serve as a new co-host for their afternoon-drive show.
