= Scott Tyner =

American football player (born 1972)

No. 4
- Position: Punter

Personal information
- Born: April 11, 1972 (age 54); Houston, Texas, U.S.
- Listed height: 6 ft 2 in (1.88 m)
- Listed weight: 225 lb (102 kg)

Career information
- High school: Edgewood (TX)
- College: Oklahoma State
- NFL draft: 1994: undrafted

Career history
- Atlanta Falcons (1994)

Awards and highlights
- First-team All-Big Eight (1993)

Career NFL statistics
- Games played: 10
- Stats at Pro Football Reference

Scott Dalton Tyner (born April 11, 1972) is a former punter who played five seasons in the National Football League (NFL) for the Atlanta Falcons. Tyner attended Oklahoma State and Trinity Valley Community College after high school in Edgewood, Texas.
