= Shannon Clavelle =

American football player (born 1973)

No. 91
- Position: Defensive end

Personal information
- Born: October 12, 1973 (age 53); Lafayette, Louisiana, U.S.
- Listed height: 6 ft 2 in (1.88 m)
- Listed weight: 287 lb (130 kg)

Career information
- High school: O. Perry Walker (New Orleans, Louisiana)
- College: Colorado
- NFL draft: 1995: 6th round, 185th overall pick

Career history
- Buffalo Bills (1995)*; Green Bay Packers (1995–1997); Kansas City Chiefs (1997)
- * Offseason or practice squad member only

Awards and highlights
- Super Bowl champion (XXXI); 2× First-team All-Big Eight (1993, 1994)

Career NFL statistics
- Games played: 16
- Sacks: 0.5
- Stats at Pro Football Reference

Shannon Lynn Clavelle (born October 12, 1973) is an American former professional football player who was a defensive end in the National Football League (NFL) for the Green Bay Packers and Kansas City Chiefs. He played college football for the Colorado Buffaloes under head coach Bill McCartney. Clavelle fathered a son, Derek McCartney, with McCartney's daughter, Kristy.

Clavelle was selected by the Buffalo Bills in the sixth round (185th overall) of the 1995 NFL draft. He debuted in the NFL though with the Green Bay Packers in 1995. He played on the Packers Super Bowl XXXI championship team of 1996 that beat the New England Patriots. In 1997, he played six games with the Packers and finished his career that year playing in one game with the Kansas City Chiefs.
