= Tony Berti =

American football player (born 1972)

No. 61, 75, 73
- Positions: Guard, tackle

Personal information
- Born: June 21, 1972 (age 54); Rock Springs, Wyoming, U.S.
- Listed height: 6 ft 6 in (1.98 m)
- Listed weight: 300 lb (136 kg)

Career information
- High school: Thornton (CO) Skyview
- College: Colorado
- NFL draft: 1995: 6th round, 200th overall pick

Career history
- San Diego Chargers (1995–1998); Seattle Seahawks (1998); Denver Broncos (1999)*; Berlin Thunder (2000); Green Bay Packers (2000)*; Las Vegas Outlaws (2001)
- * Offseason or practice squad member only

Awards and highlights
- Third-team All-American (1994); First-team All-Big Eight (1994); Second-team All-Big Eight (1993)

Career NFL statistics
- Games played: 33
- Games started: 30
- Fumble recoveries: 1
- Stats at Pro Football Reference

Charles Anton Berti Jr. (born June 21, 1972) is an American former professional football player who was an offensive lineman for four seasons with the San Diego Chargers of the National Football League (NFL). He played college football for the Colorado Buffaloes and was selected in the sixth round of the 1995 NFL draft. Starting at guard and tackle in 1996 and 1997, Berti was an integral member of the Chargers' offensive line. A shoulder injury during training camp in 1998, put him on the IR list for most of the season. With a significant number of starters injured and limited maneuverability under the salary cap, the Chargers reluctantly traded Berti to the play-off bound Seattle Seahawks with only five weeks remaining in the season. In 1999, Berti was one of only two free-agents signed by the two-time Super Bowl champion Denver Broncos. However, another shoulder injury and subsequent surgery during training camp sidelined him again for the 1999 season. He signed with the Green Bay Packers in 2000. Days into training camp he abruptly announced his retirement.

In 2001, joining former teammates San Diego Charger Kurt Gouveia and Denver Bronco David Diaz-Infante, Berti was named the starting right tackle for the start-up XFL's Las Vegas Outlaws.
