= Hessley Hempstead =

American football player (1972–2021)

No. 66
- Position: Offensive lineman

Personal information
- Born: January 29, 1972; Upland, California, U.S.
- Died: June 11, 2021 (aged 49); Charlotte, North Carolina, U.S.
- Listed height: 6 ft 1 in (1.85 m)
- Listed weight: 295 lb (134 kg)

Career information
- High school: Upland (CA)
- College: Kansas
- NFL draft: 1995: 7th round, 228th overall pick

Career history
- Detroit Lions (1995–1998)

Awards and highlights
- 2× First-team All-Big Eight (1993, 1994)

Career NFL statistics
- Games played: 31
- Games started: 1
- Stats at Pro Football Reference

Hessley James Hempstead II (January 29, 1972 – June 11, 2021) was an American professional football player who was an offensive lineman in the National Football League (NFL). He was selected in the seventh round of the 1995 NFL draft with the 228th overall pick. He played for the Detroit Lions. He played college football for the Kansas Jayhawks. After the end of his playing career, Hessley worked as a scout for the Lions in 2000 and the Washington Redskins in 2001. Hessley Hempstead died after suffering a heart attack on June 11, 2021.
