= 1994 All-Big Eight Conference football team =

American all-star college football team

The 1994 All-Big Eight Conference football team consists of American football players chosen by various organizations for All-Big Eight Conference teams for the 1994 NCAA Division I-A football season. The selectors for the 1994 season included the Associated Press (AP).

== Offensive selections ==
=== Quarterbacks ===
- Kordell Stewart, Colorado (AP-1)
- Chad May, Kansas State (AP-1 [tie])
- Brook Berringer, Nebraska (AP-2)

=== Running backs ===
- Rashaan Salaam, Colorado (AP-1)
- Lawrence Phillips, Nebraska (AP-1)
- J. J. Smith, Kansas State (AP-2)
- Jerald Moore, Oklahoma (AP-2)

=== Tight ends ===
- Christian Fauria, Colorado (AP-1)
- Lamont Frazier, Missouri (AP-2)

=== Wide receivers ===
- Michael Westbrook, Colorado (AP-1)
- Tyson Schwieger, Kansas State (AP-1)
- Kevin Lockett, Kansas State (AP-2)
- Rafael Denson, Oklahoma State (AP-2)

=== Centers ===
- Bryan Stoltenberg, Colorado (AP-1)
- Tony Booth, Iowa State (AP-2)

=== Offensive linemen ===
- Zach Wiegert, Nebraska (AP-1)
- Tony Berti, Colorado (AP-1)
- Brenden Stai, Nebraska (AP-1)
- Hessley Hempstead, Kansas (AP-1)
- Rob Zatechka, Nebraska (AP-2)
- Chris Naeole, Colorado (AP-2)
- Jim Hmielewski, Kansas State (AP-2)
- John Jones, Kansas (AP-2)

== Defensive selections ==
=== Defensive lineman ===
- Shannon Clavelle, Colorado (AP-1)
- Cedric Jones, Oklahoma (AP-1)
- Tim Colston, Kansas State (AP-1)
- Terry Connealy, Nebraska (AP-2)
- Nyle Wiren, Kansas State (AP-2)
- Jevon Langford, Oklahoma State (AP-2)

=== Linebackers ===
- Ed Stewart, Nebraska (AP-1 [ILB])
- Ted Johnson, Colorado (AP-1 [ILB])
- Donta Jones, Nebraska (AP-1 [OLB])
- Troy Dumas, Nebraska (AP-1 [OLB])
- Travis McDonald, Missouri (AP-2 [ILB])
- Tyrell Peters, Oklahoma (AP-2 [ILB])
- Percell Gaskins, Kansas State (AP-2 [OLB])
- Don Davis, Kansas (AP-2 [OLB])

=== Defensive backs ===
- Joe Gordon, Kansas State (AP-1)
- Chris Hudson, Colorado (AP-1)
- Darrius Johnson, Oklahoma (AP-1)
- Barron Miles, Nebraska (AP-1)
- Chuck Marlowe, Kansas State (AP-2)
- Kareem Moss, Nebraska (AP-2)
- Chris Canty, Kansas State (AP-2)
- Donnell Leomiti, Colorado (AP-2)

== Special teams ==
=== Place-kicker ===
- Scott Blanton, Oklahoma (AP-1)
- Ty Stewart, Iowa State (AP-2)

=== Punter ===
- Greg Ivy, Oklahoma State (AP-1)
- Kyle Pooler, Missouri (AP-2)

== Coach of the Year ==
- Tom Osborne, Nebraska (AP-1)

== Key ==
AP = Associated Press

== See also ==
- 1994 College Football All-America Team
