= Christian Fauria =

American football player (born 1971)

No. 85, 86, 88
- Position: Tight end

Personal information
- Born: September 22, 1971 (age 55); Harbor City, California, U.S.
- Listed height: 6 ft 4 in (1.93 m)
- Listed weight: 250 lb (113 kg)

Career information
- High school: Crespi Carmelite (Encino, California)
- College: Colorado (1990–1994)
- NFL draft: 1995: 2nd round, 39th overall pick

Career history
- Seattle Seahawks (1995–2001); New England Patriots (2002–2005); Washington Redskins (2006); Carolina Panthers (2007)

Awards and highlights
- 2× Super Bowl champion (XXXVIII, XXXIX); National champion (1990); Third-team All-American (1994); First-team All-Big Eight (1994); 2× Second-team All-Big Eight (1992, 1993)

Career NFL statistics
- Receptions: 252
- Receiving yards: 2,529
- Receiving touchdowns: 22
- Stats at Pro Football Reference

Christian Ashley Fauria (born September 22, 1971) is an American former professional football player who was a tight end in the National Football League (NFL). He played college football for the Colorado Buffaloes, earning third-team All-American honors in 1994.

== Early life ==
Fauria attended Crespi Carmelite High School in Encino, California and lettered in football, track, and once in basketball. In football, as a senior, he was the team captain, the team Most Valuable Player, a first-team All-Del Rey League honoree, and a first-team All-CIF honoree. In his only season of high school varsity basketball, he averaged 16.0 points and 13.0 rebounds. Fauria graduated from high school in 1990.

== Football career ==
=== College ===
Fauria attended the University of Colorado at Boulder, where he caught 98 passes for 1,458 yards (14.87 yards per rec.), and 12 touchdowns in a successful partnership with quarterback Kordell Stewart. He still holds the Big Eight Conference record for pass receptions by a tight end. As a senior, he was the team captain on an AP "top 3 team" that posted an 11–1 record, and was part of the offensive line that assisted Heisman Trophy winner Rashaan Salaam to a 2,000 yard season. In that year, Fauria was also a first-team All-Big 8 choice, a third-team Associated Press All-American choice, and he won the Derek Singleton Award, which is given to the University of Colorado football player who displays the most enthusiasm, dedication, and spirit. While in college, he appeared in an American version of Takeshi's Castle with other members of his family called "Storm the Castle" in 1993 and finished fifth. As stated in a broadcast of First Take, Fauria was involved in a fight during his senior year in college. He was attacked by a group of people and while defending himself, defeated the two attackers. However, this did not sit well with NFL teams who do not want their prospective draft picks "fighting." According to Fauria the situation cost him a First Round selection (Most Likely To Pittsburgh @ #27) and millions of dollars.

=== Professional football ===
Pre-draft measurables
Height	Weight	Arm length	Hand span
6 ft 4 in (1.93 m)	238 lb (108 kg)	32 5/8 in (0.83 m)	10 in (0.25 m)

Drafted with the 39th pick, Fauria played seven seasons with the Seattle Seahawks, recording a career-high 37 receptions in 1998. He then joined the New England Patriots in 2002 up until 2005, where he started and played for two Super Bowl championships (2004, 2005). Some believed he was signed in 2002 to serve as a mentor to 1st round draft pick and fellow University of Colorado alumnus Daniel Graham, however Fauria earned the starting position during the season and recorded a career-high of seven touchdowns for the year. After the Patriots, Fauria joined the Washington Redskins for one season. He was released on February 28, 2007, and signed with the Carolina Panthers on September 10, 2007, to play in his 13th and final season.

On November 18, 2007, Fauria (age 36) and Quarterback Vinny Testaverde (age 44) hooked up for a two-yard touchdown reception that entered the pair into the NFL record books as having the oldest combined age for a touchdown reception (over 80 years).

==== NFL statistics ====
Year	Team	Games	Receptions	Yards	Yards per Reception	Longest Reception	Touchdowns	First Downs	Fumbles	Fumbles Lost
1995	SEA	14	17	181	10.6	20	1	11	0	0
1996	SEA	10	18	214	11.9	23	1	14	0	0
1997	SEA	16	10	110	11.0	25	0	5	0	0
1998	SEA	16	37	377	10.2	25	2	16	1	1
1999	SEA	16	35	376	10.7	25	0	19	1	0
2000	SEA	15	28	237	8.5	16	2	13	1	0
2001	SEA	16	21	188	9.0	30	1	11	1	1
2002	NE	16	27	253	9.4	33	7	16	0	0
2003	NE	16	28	285	10.2	28	2	14	0	0
2004	NE	16	16	195	12.2	25	2	9	0	0
2005	NE	16	8	57	7.1	18	2	7	0	0
2006	WSH	9	2	17	8.5	11	0	1	0	0
2007	CAR	15	5	39	7.8	16	2	5	0	0
Career		191	252	2,529	10.0	33	22	141	4	2

== Post-NFL career ==
Fauria is a studio analyst for College Football on CBS Sports Network. Fauria previously served as a College Football analyst for ESPN.

Fauria was part of the WEEI-FM midday show called Gresh & Fauria, with Andy Gresh. In February 2018, he was suspended by the station for five days for using a stereotyped Asian accent to mock Chinese-American sports agent Don Yee, who represents former teammate Tom Brady. Partly due to fallout from the incident, WEEI-FM suspended its daytime live programming on February 16 so all employees could attend mandatory sensitivity training.

== Personal life ==
Fauria resides in Foxborough, Massachusetts. He has five children. His son, Caleb Fauria, is a student and football player (Tight end) at his alma mater, University of Colorado, Boulder. His nephew, Joseph Fauria, played tight end for the Detroit Lions. His daughter, Camryn, is a D1 basketball player at the University of New Hampshire.
