= Bryan Stoltenberg =

American football player (1972–2013)

No. 60, 64, 67
- Position: Center / Guard

Personal information
- Born: August 25, 1972; Kearney, Nebraska, U.S.
- Died: January 4, 2013 (aged 40); Sugar Land, Texas, U.S.
- Listed height: 6 ft 1 in (1.85 m)
- Listed weight: 300 lb (136 kg)

Career information
- High school: Clements (Sugar Land)
- College: Colorado
- NFL draft: 1996: 6th round, 192nd overall pick

Career history
- San Diego Chargers (1996); New York Giants (1997); Carolina Panthers (1998–2000)

Awards and highlights
- Consensus All-American (1995); 2× First-team All-Big Eight (1994, 1995); Second-team All-Big Eight (1993)

Career NFL statistics
- Games Played: 50
- Games Started: 18
- Stats at Pro Football Reference

Bryan Stoltenberg (August 25, 1972 – January 4, 2013) was an American professional football player who was an offensive lineman in the National Football League (NFL) for the San Diego Chargers, New York Giants, and Carolina Panthers. He graduated from Clements High School of Sugar Land, Texas, in 1991. Stoltenberg played college football for the Colorado Buffaloes, earning consensus All-American in 1995. He was selected in the sixth round of the 1996 NFL draft.

Stoltenberg died on January 4, 2013, in Sugar Land, Texas as a result of complications stemming from injuries sustained in a traffic collision the month prior.
