= Michael Westbrook =

American football player (born 1972)

No. 82
- Position: Wide receiver

Personal information
- Born: July 7, 1972 (age 54); Detroit, Michigan, U.S.
- Listed height: 6 ft 3 in (1.91 m)
- Listed weight: 221 lb (100 kg)

Career information
- High school: Chadsey (Detroit)
- College: Colorado
- NFL draft: 1995: 1st round, 4th overall pick

Career history
- Washington Redskins (1995–2001); Cincinnati Bengals (2002)

Awards and highlights
- Consensus All-American (1994); Second-team All-American (1992); Paul Warfield Trophy (1994); 2× First-team All-Big Eight (1992, 1994); Second-team All-Big Eight (1993)

Career NFL statistics
- Receptions: 285
- Receiving yards: 4,374
- Receiving touchdowns: 26
- Stats at Pro Football Reference
- College Football Hall of Fame

Michael Deanailo Westbrook (born July 7, 1972) is an American former professional football player who was a wide receiver in the National Football League (NFL). Westbrook played college football for the Colorado Buffaloes, and was recognized as a consensus All-American in 1994. He was selected in the first round of the 1995 NFL draft, and played professionally for the Washington Redskins and Cincinnati Bengals of the NFL. After retiring from football, he later competed as a mixed martial arts fighter in the heavyweight division.

== Early life ==
Westbrook was born in Detroit, Michigan. He attended Chadsey High School in Detroit, and played for the Chadsey Explorers high school football team.

== College football ==
Westbrook attended the University of Colorado at Boulder, where he played for the Colorado Buffaloes football team from 1991 to 1994. As a senior in 1994, he was the receiver in the play known as "The Miracle at Michigan," a Hail Mary pass from Buffaloes quarterback Kordell Stewart to beat the Michigan Wolverines in the final seconds of the game. At the conclusion of the season, he was recognized as a consensus first-team All-American, and was the recipient of the Paul Warfield Trophy as the best college wide receiver in the nation.

== Professional football ==
The Washington Redskins selected Westbrook in the first round (fourth overall pick) of the 1995 NFL draft. He played for seven seasons in Washington, before playing the 2002 season with the Cincinnati Bengals.

In August 1997, the Redskins fined Westbrook $50,000 for punching a teammate, running back Stephen Davis, an incident caught by TV news cameras.

While injuries hampered Westbrook for much of his NFL career, he played all 16 games in 1999 en route to achieving career highs in receptions (65), yards (1,191), and touchdowns (nine). Westbrook finished his career with 285 receptions for 4,374 yards and 26 touchdowns. He also rushed 22 times for 160 yards and one touchdown.

=== NFL statistics ===
Year	Team	GP	Receiving						Rushing					
Year	Team	GP	Rec	Yds	Avg	Lng	TD	FD	Att	Yds	Avg	Lng	TD	FD
1995	WSH	11	34	522	15.4	45	1	25	6	114	19.0	58	1	4
1996	WSH	11	34	505	14.9	45	1	25	2	2	1.0	2	0	0
1997	WSH	13	34	559	16.4	40	3	30	3	-11	-3.7	7	0	0
1998	WSH	11	44	736	16.7	75	6	33	1	11	11.0	11	0	1
1999	WSH	16	65	1,191	18.3	65	9	47	7	35	5.0	12	0	2
2000	WSH	2	9	103	11.4	21	0	7	—	—	—	—	—	—
2001	WSH	16	57	664	11.6	76	4	32	2	8	4.0	8	0	1
2002	CIN	9	8	94	11.8	26	2	4	1	1	1.0	1	0	0
Career		89	285	4,374	15.3	76	26	203	22	160	7.3	58	1	8

== Martial arts ==
Westbrook practiced martial arts during his football playing career, and entered Brazilian Jiu-Jitsu after retirement from the NFL in 2002. He has won national and Pan-American events as a brown belt. In 2008, he won the International Brazilian Jiu-Jitsu Federation ("IBJJF") World Championship at purple belt.

Westbrook said of jiu-jitsu, "This is a lot easier and a lot more fun [than football]. I don't have to worry about coaches and it's not nearly as dangerous. I don't have to worry about pleasing the public and the announcers. Or getting eggs thrown at my door because I dropped a ball. I don't have to worry about any of that." Having previously trained with the MASH FIGHT TEAM in Michigan with Former "King Of The Cage" Light Heavyweight Champion James Lee, Westbook now trains at Arizona Combat Sports in Tempe, Arizona.

As a mixed martial artist, Westbrook competes in the heavyweight (206-265 lbs.) division. He fought once in 2005 and defeated fellow NFL veteran Jarrod Bunch in the main event of a King of the Cage event in Cleveland, Ohio. After the Bunch fight, Westbrook was inactive for four years; and his return to professional MMA was less successful than his debut. In February, 2009, Travis Browne defeated Westbrook in San Bernardino, California, by technical knockout in the third round. In July 2009, Westbrook squared off against Nick Gaston in the main event of a King of the Cage card in Lac du Flambeau, Wisconsin. One minute into the fight, Gaston struck Westbrook in the groin with a knee strike, and Westbrook could not continue. The fight was ruled a no contest.

Westbrook also fought on season two, episode ten, of MTV's Bully Beatdown. On that episode, it was stated that Westbrook owns a black belt in taekwondo and has reached brown-belt status in Brazilian Jiu-Jitsu under Gustavo Dantas. Westbrook was promoted to a Black Belt in Brazilian Jiu-Jitsu in 2010.

== Mixed martial arts record ==
Professional record breakdown
3 matches	1 win	1 loss
By knockout	0	1
By submission	1	0
By decision	0	0
No contests	1	

Res.	Record	Opponent	Method	Event	Date	Round	Time	Location	Notes
NC	1–2	Nick Gaston	No contest	KOTC: Connection	July 18, 2009	1	1:04	Lac de Flambeau, Wisconsin, United States	
Loss	1–1	Travis Browne	TKO (punches)	KOTC: Immortal	February 27, 2009	3	1:22	San Bernardino, California, United States	
Win	1–0	Jarrod Bunch	Submission (rear-naked choke)	KOTC 48: Payback	February 25, 2005	1	4:55	Cleveland, Ohio, United States	
