= 1993 All-Big Eight Conference football team =

American all-star college football team

The 1993 All-Big Eight Conference football team consists of American football players chosen by various organizations for All-Big Eight Conference teams for the 1993 NCAA Division I-A football season. The selectors for the 1993 season included the Associated Press (AP) and Coaches poll.

== Offensive selections ==
=== Quarterbacks ===
- Cale Gundy, Oklahoma (AP-1)
- Chad May, Kansas State (Coaches-1)
- Tommie Frazier, Nebraska (AP-2; Coaches-2)

=== Running backs ===
- Calvin Jones, Nebraska (AP-1; Coaches-1)
- June Henley, Kansas (AP-1; Coaches-2)
- Rashaan Salaam, Colorado (AP-2; Coaches-1)
- Lamont Warren, Colorado (AP-2; Coaches-2)

=== Tight ends ===
- A. J. Ofodile, Missouri (AP-1)
- Rickey Brady, Oklahoma (AP-2; Coaches-1)
- Dwayne Chandler, Kansas (Coaches-2)
- Christian Fauria, Colorado (Coaches-2)

=== Wide receivers ===
- Charles Johnson, Colorado (AP-1; Coaches-1)
- Andre Coleman, Kansas State (AP-1; Coaches-1)
- Kevin Lockett, Kansas State (AP-2)
- Kenny Holly, Missouri (AP-2; Coaches-2)
- Michael Westbrook, Colorado (Coaches-2)

=== Centers ===
- Quentin Neujahr, Kansas State (AP-1; Coaches-1)
- Bryan Stoltenberg, Colorado (AP-2)
- Dan Schmidt, Kansas (Coaches-2)

=== Offensive linemen ===
- Zach Wiegert, Nebraska (AP-1; Coaches-1)
- Lance Lundberg, Nebraska (AP-1; Coaches-1)
- Mike Bedosky, Missouri (AP-1; Coaches-1)
- Doug Skartvedt, Iowa State (AP-1)
- John Jones, Kansas (AP-2; Coaches-1)
- Hessley Hempstead, Kansas (AP-2; Coaches-1)
- Ken Mehlin, Nebraska (Coaches-1)
- Tony Berti, Colorado (AP-2; Coaches-2)
- Harry Stamps, Oklahoma (AP-2; Coaches-2)
- Barrett Brooks, Kansas State (Coaches-2)

== Defensive selections ==
=== Defensive ends ===
- Trev Alberts, Nebraska (AP-1; Coaches-1)
- Jason Gildon, Oklahoma State (AP-1; Coaches-1)
- John Butler, Kansas State (AP-2)
- Rick Lyle, Missouri (AP-2)

=== Defensive lineman ===
- Chris Maumalanga, Kansas (AP-1; Coaches-1)
- Terry Connealy, Nebraska (AP-1; Coaches-2)
- Kevin Ramaekers, Nebraska (AP-1)
- Shannon Clavelle, Colorado (AP-2; Coaches-1)
- Kerry Hicks, Colorado (Coaches-1)
- Darrell Harbert, Kansas State (AP-2; Coaches-2)
- Troy Petersen, Iowa State (AP-2)
- Tim Colston, Kansas State (Coaches-2)

=== Linebackers ===
- Keith Burns, Oklahoma State (AP-1; Coaches-1)
- Ron Woolfork, Colorado (AP-1; Coaches-2)
- Aubrey Beavers, Oklahoma (AP-1)
- Mario Freeman, Oklahoma (Coaches-1)
- Sam Rogers, Colorado (AP-2; Coaches-2)
- Ted Johnson, Colorado (AP-2)
- Mike Coats, Oklahoma (AP-2)
- Ed Stewart, Nebraska (Coaches-2)
- Darryl Major, Missouri (Coaches-2)

=== Defensive backs ===
- Jaime Mendez, Kansas State (AP-1; Coaches-1)
- Chris Hudson, Colorado (AP-1; Coaches-1)
- Thomas Randolph, Kansas State (AP-1; Coaches-1)
- Barron Miles, Nebraska (Coaches-1)
- Darrius Johnson, Oklahoma (AP-2; Coaches-2)
- Kenny McEntyre, Kansas State (AP-2)
- John Reece, Nebraska (AP-2)
- Kevin Fulton, Iowa State (Coaches-2)
- Jason Oliver, Missouri (Coaches-2)
- Toby Wright, Nebraska (Coaches-2)

== Special teams ==
=== Place-kicker ===
- Ty Stewart, Iowa State (AP-1; Coaches-1)
- Dan Eichloff, Kansas (AP-2; Coaches-2)

=== Punter ===
- Scott Tyner, Oklahoma State (AP-1; Coaches-1)
- Kyle Pooler, Missouri (AP-2; Coaches-2)

=== Return specialist ===
- James McMillion, Iowa State (Coaches-1)
- Andre Coleman, Kansas State (coaches-2)

== Coach of the Year ==
- Bill Snyder, Kansas State (AP-1)

== Key ==
AP = Associated Press

Coaches = selections by conference head coaches

== See also ==
- 1993 College Football All-America Team
