= 1994 All-America college football team =

Best college football players of 1994

The 1994 All-America college football team is composed of the following All-American Teams: Associated Press, United Press International, Football Writers Association of America, American Football Coaches Association, Walter Camp Foundation, Scripps-Howard, The Sporting News and Football News.

The College Football All-America Team is an honor given annually to the best American college football players at their respective positions. The original usage of the term All-America seems to have been to such a list selected by football pioneer Walter Camp in the 1890s. The NCAA officially recognizes All-Americans selected by the AFCA, AP, FN, FWAA, TSN, UPI, and WCFF to determine Consensus All-Americans.

The Newspaper Enterprise Association (NEA), the oldest All-American college football selection at the time, also selected a team.

== Offense ==
=== Quarterback ===
- Kerry Collins, Penn St. (AP-1, Walter Camp, FWAA-Writers, Scripps-Howard, Sporting News, Football News, NEA-2)
- Eric Zeier, Georgia (AFCA-Coaches)
- Kordell Stewart, Colorado (AP-2)
- Jay Barker, Alabama (AP-3)
- Steve McNair, Alcorn State (NEA-1)

=== Running backs ===
- Rashaan Salaam, Colorado (AP-1, Walter Camp, FWAA-Writers, AFCA-Coaches, Scripps-Howard, Sporting News, Football News, NEA-1)
- Ki-Jana Carter, Penn St. (AP-1, Walter Camp, FWAA-Writers, AFCA-Coaches, Scripps-Howard, Sporting News, Football News, NEA-1)
- Lawrence Phillips, Nebraska (AP-2, NEA-2)
- Napoleon Kaufman, Washington (AP-2, NEA-2)
- Andre Davis, TCU (AP-3)
- Robert Baldwin, Duke (AP-3)

=== Wide receivers ===
- Jack Jackson, Florida (AP-1, Walter Camp, FWAA-Writers, AFCA-Coaches Scripps-Howard, Sporting News, Football News, NEA-1)
- Michael Westbrook, Colorado (Walter Camp, AFCA-Coaches, Sporting News, NEA-2)
- Frank Sanders, Auburn (AP-1, FWAA-Writers, Scripps-Howard)
- Bobby Engram, Penn St. (AP-2, Walter Camp, NEA-1)
- Kevin Jordan, UCLA (AP-3, Football News, NEA-2)
- Alex Van Dyke, Nevada (AP-2)
- Keyshawn Johnson, USC (AP-3)

=== Tight end ===
- Pete Mitchell, Boston College (AP-1, Walter Camp, FWAA-Writers, Scripps-Howard, Sporting News, NEA-1)
- Kyle Brady, Penn St. (AP-2, AFCA-Coaches, NEA-2)
- Jamie Asher, Louisville (Football News)
- Christian Fauria, Colorado (AP-3)

=== Guards/tackles ===
- Zach Wiegert, Nebraska (AP-1, Walter Camp, FWAA-Writers, AFCA-Coaches, Scripps-Howard, Sporting News, Football News, NEA-1)
- Tony Boselli, USC (College Football Hall of Fame) (AP-1, FWAA-Writers, AFCA-Coaches, Scripps-Howard, Sporting News, Football News, NEA-1)
- Korey Stringer, Ohio St. (AP-1, Walter Camp, AFCA-Coaches, Sporting News, Football News, NEA-1)
- Blake Brockermeyer, Texas (AP-2, FWAA-Writers, Sporting News)
- Brenden Stai, Nebraska (AP-2, Walter Camp, FWAA-Writers, NEA-2)
- Jeff Hartings, Penn St. (AP-1, Walter Camp, NEA-1)
- Ruben Brown, Pittsburgh (AP-2, AFCA-Coaches, Football News, NEA-2)
- Tirrell Greene, Miami (Fl.) (Scripps-Howard)
- Jeff Smith, Tennessee (Scripps-Howard)
- Tony Berti, Colorado (AP-3)
- Jesse James, Mississippi St. (AP-3)
- Jason Odom, Florida (AP-3)
- Anthony Brown, Utah (AP-3)
- Roman Oben, Louisville, (NEA-2)
- Steve Ingram, Maryland, (NEA-2)

=== Center ===
- Cory Raymer, Wisconsin (AP-1, Walter Camp, AFCA-Coaches, Sporting News, Football News, NEA-1)
- Clay Shiver, Florida State (AP-2, FWAA-Writers, Scripps-Howard, NEA-2)
- K. C. Jones, Miami (Fl.) (AP-3)

== Defense ==
=== Ends ===
- Luther Elliss, Utah (AP-1, Walter Camp, FWAA-Writers, AFCA-Coaches, Scripps-Howard, Sporting News, NEA-2)
- Derrick Alexander, Florida St. (AP-1, Walter Camp, FWAA-Writers, NEA-1)
- Kevin Carter, Florida (AP-2, Walter Camp, Sporting News, Football News, NEA-1)
- Simeon Rice, Illinois (AP-2 [as LB], AFCA-Coaches, Football News, NEA-2)
- Mike Pelton, Auburn (AP-2, NEA-2)
- Dameian Jeffries, Alabama (AP-2)
- Chad Eaton, Washington St. (AP-3)
- Marcus Jones, North Carolina (AP-3)
- Matt Finkes, Ohio St. (AP-3)

=== Tackles ===
- Warren Sapp, Miami (Fla.) (AP-1, Walter Camp, FWAA-Writers, AFCA-Coaches, Scripps-Howard, Sporting News, Football News, NEA-1)
- Tedy Bruschi, Arizona (College Football Hall of Fame) (AP-1, Walter Camp, FWAA-Writers, AFCA-Coaches, Scripps-Howard, Sporting News, NEA-1)
- Ellis Johnson, Florida (Scripps-Howard, NEA-2)
- DeWayne Patterson, Washington State (AP-2, Football News, NEA-2)
- Tim Colston, Kansas St. (AP-3)

=== Linebackers ===
- Dana Howard, Illinois (AP-1, Walter Camp, FWAA-Writers, AFCA-Coaches, Scripps-Howard, Sporting News, Football News, NEA-1)
- Derrick Brooks, Florida St. (College Football Hall of Fame) (Walter Camp, FWAA-Writers, AFCA-Coaches, Scripps-Howard, Sporting News, NEA-1)
- Ed Stewart, Nebraska (AP-1, Walter Camp, FWAA-Writers, AFCA-Coaches, Scripps-Howard, NEA-1)
- Stephen Boyd, Boston College (Sporting News, Football News)
- Antonio Armstrong, Texas A&M (AP-1, Football News, NEA-2)
- Zach Thomas, Texas Tech (College Football Hall of Fame) (AP-2, AFCA-Coaches)
- Ray Lewis, Miami (Fla.) (AP-3, Football News)
- Ted Johnson, North Carolina (AP-2)
- Donnie Edwards, UCLA (AP-3, NEA-2)
- Mark Fields, Washington St. (AP-3)
- Lorenzo Styles, Ohio State (NEA-2)

=== Backs ===
- Bobby Taylor, Notre Dame (AP-3, Walter Camp, AFCA-Coaches, Scripps-Howard, Sporting News, Football News)
- Clifton Abraham, Florida State (AP-1, Walter Camp, AFCA-Coaches, Sporting News, Football News, NEA-1)
- Chris Hudson, Colorado (AP-1, Walter Camp, FWAA-Writers, Scripps-Howard, NEA-1)
- Tony Bouie, Arizona (Walter Camp, AFCA-Coaches, Sporting News, NEA-2)
- Brian Robinson, Auburn (AP-1, Walter Camp, Football News, NEA-1)
- Greg Myers, Colorado State (AP-2, FWAA-Writers, Scripps-Howard, Sporting News)
- Chris Shelling, Auburn (FWAA-Writers, Scripps-Howard)
- Orlando Thomas, SW Louisiana (AP-2, Football News, NEA-1)
- Ty Law, Michigan, (Walter Camp, NEA-2)
- C. J. Richardson, Miami (Fla.) (AP-1, NEA-2)
- Herman O'Berry, Oregon (FWAA-Writers)
- Aaron Beasley, West Virginia (AP-2)
- Chad Cota, Oregon (AP-2)
- Barron Miles, Nebraska (AP-3)
- Ronde Barber, Virginia (AP-3)
- Ray Farmer, Duke (AP-3)
- Alundis Brice, Mississippi (NEA-2)

== Specialists ==
=== Placekicker ===
- Steve McLaughlin, Arizona (AP-3, FWAA-Writers, Scripps-Howard, Sporting News)
- Brian Leaver, Bowling Green (AP-1, Football News, NEA-2)
- Michael Proctor, Alabama (AFCA-Coaches)
- Remy Hamilton, Michigan (AP-2, Walter Camp, NEA-1)

=== Punter ===
- Todd Sauerbrun, West Virginia (AP-1, Walter Camp, FWAA-Writers, AFCA-Coaches, Scripps-Howard, Sporting News, Football News, NEA-1)
- Brad Maynard, Ball St. (AP-2, NEA-2)
- Jason Bender, Georgia Tech (AP-3)

=== All-purpose / kick returners ===
- Leeland McElroy, Texas A&M (AP-All-Purpose-3, Walter Camp, FWAA-Writers, Scripps-Howard, Sporting News)
- Brian Pruitt, Central Michigan (AP-All-Purpose-1)
- Sherman Williams, Alabama (AP-All-Purpose-2)

== See also ==
- 1994 All-Atlantic Coast Conference football team
- 1994 All-Big Eight Conference football team
- 1994 All-Big Ten Conference football team
- 1994 All-Pacific-10 Conference football team
- 1994 All-SEC football team
