= Darrius Johnson =

American football player (1972–2021)

No. 25, 41
- Position: Cornerback

Personal information
- Born: September 17, 1973; Terrell, Texas, U.S.
- Died: February 25, 2021 (aged 47); Fort Worth, Texas, U.S.
- Listed height: 5 ft 9 in (1.75 m)
- Listed weight: 185 lb (84 kg)

Career information
- High school: Terrell (TX)
- College: Oklahoma
- NFL draft: 1996: 4th round, 122nd overall pick

Career history
- Denver Broncos (1996–1999); Kansas City Chiefs (2003)

Awards and highlights
- 2× Super Bowl champion (XXXII, XXXIII); First-team All-Big Eight (1994); Second-team All-Big Eight (1993)

Career NFL statistics
- Tackles: 44
- Interceptions: 2
- Sacks: 1
- Stats at Pro Football Reference

Darrius Dashone Johnson (September 17, 1973 – February 25, 2021) was an American professional football player who was a cornerback for the Denver Broncos and Kansas City Chiefs of the National Football League (NFL).

Johnson played for the Oklahoma Sooners football team. In addition, he competed for the Oklahoma Sooners track and field team as a sprinter.

The Broncos selected Johnson in the fourth round of the 1996 NFL draft. Johnson played in 61 games for the Broncos from 1996 to 1999, during which he had two interceptions, both in 1998. One of his biggest games was a 1999 playoff game against the Miami Dolphins, where Johnson had a 44-yard interception return and caused a fumble which was returned for a touchdown. Johnson was a member of the Broncos' Super Bowl XXXII and XXXIII championship squads. Johnson played briefly for the Kansas City Chiefs in 2003.

Franciose Johnson, wife of Darrius Johnson, reported he died of sudden heart failure on February 25, 2021. After extensive examination of the brain it was determined that Darrius Johnson died with Stage 3 CTE.
