= Brenden Stai =

American football player (born 1972)

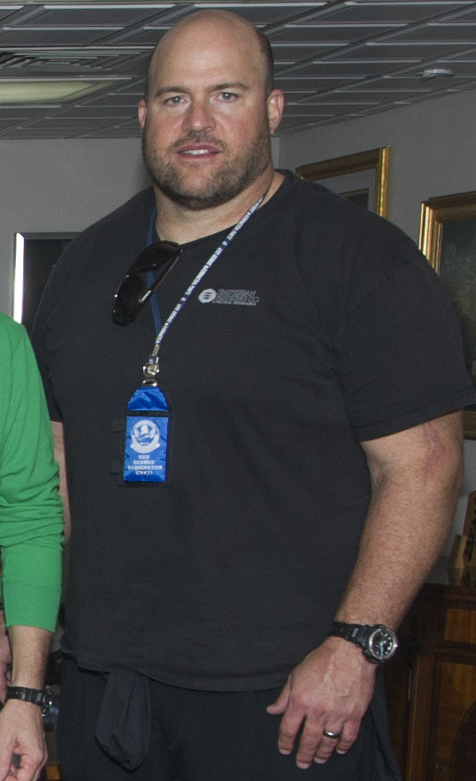
- Stai aboard USS George Washington (CVN-73) in 2016

No. 68, 66
- Position: Guard

Personal information
- Born: March 30, 1972 (age 54); Phoenix, Arizona, U.S.
- Listed height: 6 ft 4 in (1.93 m)
- Listed weight: 312 lb (142 kg)

Career information
- High school: Esperanza (Anaheim, California)
- College: Nebraska
- NFL draft: 1995: 3rd round, 91st overall pick

Career history
- Pittsburgh Steelers (1995–1999); Kansas City Chiefs (2000)*; Jacksonville Jaguars (2000); Detroit Lions (2001); Washington Redskins (2002); New England Patriots (2003)*
- * Offseason or practice squad member only

Awards and highlights
- PFWA All-Rookie Team (1995); Bowl Coalition national championship (1994); Consensus All-American (1994); First-team All-Big Eight (1994)

Career NFL statistics
- Games played: 105
- Games started: 96
- Stats at Pro Football Reference

Brenden Michael Stai (born March 30, 1972) is an American former professional football player who was an offensive guard for eight seasons in the National Football League (NFL) during the 1990s and early 2000s. He played college football for the Nebraska Cornhuskers, earning consensus All-American honors in 1994. He was selected by the Pittsburgh Steelers in the third round of the 1995 NFL draft, and also played for the Jacksonville Jaguars, Detroit Lions and Washington Redskins of the NFL.

== Early life ==
Stai was born in Phoenix, Arizona.

== College career ==
He attended the University of Nebraska-Lincoln, and played for coach Tom Osborne's Nebraska Cornhuskers football team from 1991 to 1994. As a senior in 1994, Stai was recognized as a consensus first-team All-American and was a member of the Cornhuskers' team that defeated the Miami Hurricanes 24–17 in the Orange Bowl to win a consensus national championship.

== Professional career ==
The Pittsburgh Steelers in the third round (91st pick overall) of the 1995 NFL Draft. He played for the Steelers from 1995 to 1999. Stai earned an AFC Championship with Pittsburgh in 1995; the Steelers presented all players with a ring to commemorate the achievement. Stai's ring was stolen in 2000 during a move to Jacksonville; the ring was returned to Stai in 2009 after someone attempted to sell it to Cash4Gold.com.

In nine NFL seasons, Stai appeared in 105 regular season games and started 96 of them.
