= Tim Colston =

American football player (born 1973)

No. 92
- Position: Nose tackle

Personal information
- Born: December 18, 1973 (age 52); Tampa, Florida, U.S.
- Listed height: 6 ft 0 in (1.83 m)
- Listed weight: 275 lb (125 kg)

Career information
- High school: C. Leon King (Tampa)
- College: Kansas State (1991–1995)
- NFL draft: 1996: undrafted

Career history
- Buffalo Bills (1996)*; Carolina Panthers (1996–1997); Portland Forest Dragons (1998); Nashville Kats (1999)
- * Offseason or practice squad member only

Awards and highlights
- First-team All-American (1995); Third-team All-American (1994); Big Eight Defensive Player of the Year (1995); 2× First-team All-Big Eight (1994, 1995); Second-team All-Big Eight (1993)

Career NFL statistics
- Games played: 2
- Tackles: 1
- Stats at Pro Football Reference
- Stats at ArenaFan.com

Timothy Maurice Colston (born December 18, 1973) is an American former professional football nose tackle who played for the Buffalo Bills and Carolina Panthers of the National Football League (NFL). He played college football for the Kansas State Wildcats.

== Early life ==
Colston was born on December 18, 1973, in Tampa, Florida. He attended C. Leon King High School in Tampa.

== College career ==
Colston played college football for the Kansas State Wildcats from 1991 to 1995 and was a four-year letterman from 1992 to 1995. He redshirted his first season and played in eight games the following year, recording 14 tackles, one sack and one pass deflection. As a sophomore, Colston logged 62 tackles, including nine for loss, three sacks, one pass break up and one fumble recovery in 11 games, earning second-team All-Big Eight honors.

In 1994, Colston finished third in the Big Eight with eight sacks, while adding 91 tackles, two forced fumbles and a fumble recovery. He was a first-team All-Big Eight and third-team All-American selection. As a senior, Colston had 81 tackles, with five for loss, seven sacks, one pass deflection, one forced fumble and fumble recovery. He earned first-team All-Big Eight and was the Big Eight Defensive Player of the Year. Colston was also named a first-team All-American by the American Football Coaches Association (AFCA), Newspaper Enterprise Association (NEA) and Walter Camp Football Foundation (WCFF).

== Professional career ==
=== Buffalo Bills ===
After going unselected in the 1996 NFL draft, Colston signed with the Buffalo Bills as an undrafted free agent. On August 19, he was waived by the team.

=== Carolina Panthers ===
On August 21, 1996 Colston was claimed off waivers by the Carolina Panthers. On August 25, he was released and signed to the practice squad. On October 8, Colston was elevated to the active roster. He was active for two games and made one tackle against the St. Louis Rams. On October 29, Colston was released and re-signed to the practice squad. On June 13, 1997, he was released by the Panthers.

=== Portland Forest Dragons ===
On October 25, 1997, Colston was signed with the Portland Forest Dragons of the Arena Football League (AFL). On April 27,1998, he was placed in the injured reserve with a knee injury.

=== Nashville Kats ===
On March 1, 1999, Colston was traded to the Nashville Kats of the AFL. He played in three games for the team, logging one assisted tackle. Colston was initially placed on the injured serve with a knee injury and then was shut down for the year with a torn rotator cuff. He became a free agent at the end of the season.
