= Rashaan Salaam =

American football player (1974–2016)

- Salaam with the Heisman Trophy in 1994

No. 31, 29
- Position: Running back

Personal information
- Born: October 8, 1974; San Diego, California, U.S.
- Died: December 5, 2016 (aged 42); Boulder, Colorado, U.S.
- Listed height: 6 ft 1 in (1.85 m)
- Listed weight: 225 lb (102 kg)

Career information
- High school: La Jolla Country Day (San Diego)
- College: Colorado (1992–1994)
- NFL draft: 1995: 1st round, 21st overall pick

Career history
- Chicago Bears (1995–1997); Oakland Raiders (1999)*; Cleveland Browns (1999); Green Bay Packers (1999); Memphis Maniax (2001); San Francisco 49ers (2003)*; Toronto Argonauts (2004)*
- * Offseason or practice squad member only

Awards and highlights
- UPI NFC Rookie of the Year (1995); Heisman Trophy (1994); Unanimous All-American (1994); 2× First-team All-Big Eight (1993, 1994); Colorado Buffaloes No. 19 retired

Career NFL statistics
- Rushing yards: 1,684
- Rushing average: 3.6
- Rushing touchdowns: 13
- Receptions: 16
- Receiving yards: 120
- Receiving touchdowns: 1
- Stats at Pro Football Reference
- College Football Hall of Fame

Rashaan Iman Salaam (October 8, 1974 – December 5, 2016) was an American professional football running back who played in the National Football League (NFL) for four seasons, primarily with the Chicago Bears. He played college football for the Colorado Buffaloes, winning the Heisman Trophy in 1994 after becoming the fourth college player to have more than 2,000 rushing yards in a season.

Selected by the Bears in the first round of the 1995 NFL draft, Salaam's tenure was marked by injuries, frequent fumbles, and drug use, leading to his release following the 1996 season. He pursued a comeback in 1999 with the Cleveland Browns and Green Bay Packers, but appeared in only two games with the former. Salaam last played professionally for the Memphis Maniax of the XFL in 2001. He was posthumously inducted to the College Football Hall of Fame in 2022.

== Early life ==
Born in San Diego, California, Salaam was the son of former Cincinnati Bengals running back Teddy Washington (later Sulton Salaam, after converting to Islam). A practicing Muslim, he attended La Jolla Country Day School in suburban San Diego, and played eight-man football. He was recognized as a high school All-American, and was later inducted into the school's athletic hall of fame.

== College career ==
Salaam attended the University of Colorado in Boulder, where he played for the Buffaloes from 1992 to 1994. As a junior in 1994, Salaam had one of the best individual seasons in college football history, rushing for a school-record 2,055 yards and becoming only the fourth college running back to run for more than 2,000 yards in a season. He also amassed 24 touchdowns and helped lead Colorado to an 11–1 record, including a 41–24 win over Notre Dame in the Fiesta Bowl, and a No. 3 ranking in the final Associated Press poll. The Buffaloes' only loss of the season was to Big Eight Conference rival Nebraska, which finished undefeated and ranked first in both major polls as national champions.

Salaam had four consecutive 200-yard rushing games during the season, his best effort coming against the Texas Longhorns, when he set a school record with 362 yards total offense in a 34–31 win at Austin. He was a unanimous All-American and winner of the Heisman Trophy in December, beating out running back Ki-Jana Carter of Penn State, quarterbacks Steve McNair of Alcorn State and Kerry Collins of Penn State, and defensive tackle Warren Sapp. Salaam also won the Walter Camp and Doak Walker awards.

== Professional career ==
Pre-draft measurables
Height	Weight	Arm length	Hand span	Bench press
6 ft 0 7/8 in (1.85 m)	228 lb (103 kg)	32 1/8 in (0.82 m)	9 in (0.23 m)	21 reps
All values from NFL Combine

The Chicago Bears selected Salaam in the first round, with the 21st overall selection, of the 1995 NFL draft. He played for the Bears from 1995 to 1997. As a rookie, he rushed for 1,074 yards and scored 10 touchdowns. However, he also lost 9 fumbles and averaged just 3.6 yards per carry. Problems with injuries, fumbles, and marijuana use led him to spend only three years with the Bears. During his two final years with Chicago, Salaam mustered only 608 combined yards. The Bears traded Salaam to the Miami Dolphins before the 1998 season, but it was undone when Salaam failed a physical examination. Salaam spent 1999 with the Cleveland Browns and the Green Bay Packers, but only played in two games for the Browns that year.

Salaam briefly played in the XFL for the Memphis Maniax in 2001, but injury cut his season short and the league folded after one season. He finished the year with 528 yards gained.

Salaam launched what appeared to be a final attempt at an NFL career in 2002, beginning with a much publicized training at the Cris Carter Speed School. He was picked up by the San Francisco 49ers in 2003, but was released in the penultimate round of cuts in August, despite receiving accolades from head coach Dennis Erickson.

Salaam was signed by the Toronto Argonauts of the Canadian Football League (CFL) on February 20, 2004, but was suspended by the Argos in May, ending his football career.

== Career statistics ==
Legend
**Bold**	Career high

=== NFL ===
Year	Team	Games		Rushing					Receiving				
Year	Team	GP	GS	Att	Yds	Avg	Lng	TD	Rec	Yds	Avg	Lng	TD
1995	CHI	16	11	**296**	**1,074**	**3.6**	**42**	**10**	**7**	**56**	8.0	**18**	0
1996	CHI	12	6	143	496	3.5	32	3	**7**	44	6.3	11	**1**
1997	CHI	3	3	31	112	**3.6**	17	0	2	20	**10.0**	**18**	0
1999	CLE	2	0	1	2	2.0	2	0	0	0	0.0	0	0
Career		33	20	471	1,684	3.6	42	13	16	120	7.5	18	1

=== College ===
Year	Team	GP	Rushing				Receiving		
Year	Team	GP	Att	Yds	Avg	TD	Rec	Yds	TD
1992	Colorado	7	27	158	5.9	1	1	0	0
1993	Colorado	9	161	844	5.2	8	13	118	0
1994	Colorado	11	**298**	**2,055**	**6.9**	**24**	**24**	**294**	0
Career		27	486	3,057	6.3	33	38	412	0

== Awards and honors ==
NFL

- UPI NFC Rookie of the Year (1995)
- Brian Piccolo Award (1995)

College

- Heisman Trophy (1994)
- Walter Camp Award (1994)
- Doak Walker Award (1994)
- Jim Brown Trophy (1994)
- Chic Harley Award (1994)
- Unanimous All-American (1994)
- SN Player of the Year (1994)
- Big Eight Offensive Player of the Year (1994)
- 2× First-team All-Big Eight (1993, 1994)
- Colorado Buffaloes No. 19 retired

== Death ==
On December 5, 2016, 42-year-old Salaam was found dead in a city park (Eben G. Fine) in Boulder, Colorado. An autopsy was performed because authorities found a note near the body and were investigating it as a possible suicide. Several weeks later on December 29, it was confirmed that the manner of death was suicide, specifically a gunshot wound to the head, in a report released by the Boulder County coroner's office. Salaam's blood-alcohol content was reportedly three times the legal driving limit and he had THC in his system.

Salaam's family did not consent to neuropathological tests that would have revealed whether he had previously sustained chronic head trauma, such as chronic traumatic encephalopathy. They declined to have his brain tested to determine whether his depression had been linked to such injuries from his days as a player.

== See also ==
- List of Heisman Trophy winners
- List of NCAA major college football yearly rushing leaders
- List of NCAA major college football yearly scoring leaders
