= Zach Wiegert =

American football player (born 1972)

No. 73, 72, 77
- Position: Guard

Personal information
- Born: August 16, 1972 (age 54); Fremont, Nebraska, U.S.
- Listed height: 6 ft 5 in (1.96 m)
- Listed weight: 309 lb (140 kg)

Career information
- High school: Bergan (Fremont)
- College: Nebraska
- NFL draft: 1995: 2nd round, 38th overall pick

Career history
- St. Louis Rams (1995–1998); Jacksonville Jaguars (1999–2002); Houston Texans (2003–2006)

Awards and highlights
- National champion (1994); Outland Trophy (1994); UPI Lineman of the Year (1994); Jim Parker Trophy (1994); Unanimous All-American (1994); Third-team All-American (1993); 2× First-team All-Big Eight (1993, 1994); Second-team All-Big Eight (1992); Nebraska Cornhuskers Jersey No. 72 retired

Career NFL statistics
- Games played: 145
- Games started: 137
- Fumble recoveries: 10
- Stats at Pro Football Reference
- College Football Hall of Fame

Zachary Allen Wiegert (born August 16, 1972) is an American former professional football player who was a guard in the National Football League (NFL) for twelve seasons. He played college football for the Nebraska Cornhuskers, earned unanimous All-American honors, and was a member of a national championship team. A second round pick in the 1995 NFL draft, he played professionally for the St. Louis Rams, Jacksonville Jaguars and Houston Texans of the NFL.

== Early life ==
Wiegert was born in Fremont, Nebraska. He attended Archbishop Bergan High School in Fremont, and played high school football for the Bergan Knights.

== College career ==
Wiegert attended the University of Nebraska-Lincoln, where he played for the Nebraska Cornhuskers football team from 1991 to 1994. From his sophomore through senior seasons, he started 37 consecutive games at right tackle. In his 46-game Cornhuskers career, Wiegert gave up just one quarterback sack while earning first-team All-Big Eight Conference honors in 1992, 1993 and 1994. He earned second-team All-America honors in 1993, helping lead Nebraska to an undefeated regular season and an Orange Bowl appearance.

As a senior in 1994, he was the winner of the Outland Trophy, awarded to the nation's top interior lineman, and was recognized as a unanimous All-American. Wiegert blocked for a Cornhuskers offense that led the NCAA in rushing yards for the eleventh time, averaging 340 yards per game on the ground, and Nebraska won its first national football championship since 1971. He was also the UPI Lineman of the Year, the Touchdown Club of Columbus Offensive Lineman of the Year, a finalist for the Lombardi Award, and finished 10th in the Heisman voting.

The university retired his No. 72 jersey before the 1995 season.

== Professional career ==
Pre-draft measurables
Height	Weight	Arm length	Hand span	Vertical jump	Bench press
6 ft 4 1/2 in (1.94 m)	311 lb (141 kg)	32 in (0.81 m)	9 1/2 in (0.24 m)	28.5 in (0.72 m)	23 reps

=== St. Louis Rams ===
The St. Louis Rams selected Wiegert in the second round (38th pick overall) of the 1995 NFL draft. He played with the Rams from 1995 to 1998. As a rookie in 1995, he played in five games and started two; he was inactive for the first seven games with a left ankle injury suffered in final preseason game. In 1996, he started all 16 regular season games at right tackle. The following year, under new coach Dick Vermiel, Wiegert moved to right guard and started 15 of 16 regular season games. He caught a one-yard pass to give the Rams a first down on a game-winning drive that resulted in Jeff Wilkins' 25-yard field goal with four seconds remaining at Washington (11/30/1997). He also scored a touchdown after recovering Jerald Moore's fumble in the end zone at Carolina (12/20/1997). He was granted free agency on February 13, 1998, and re-signed with Rams on June 17, 1998. In 1998, he started 13 games at right guard for St. Louis. He missed three games with a knee injury. He was designated by the Rams as a transition player on February 12, 1999, and was re-signed by the Rams on March 24, 1999. He was released on April 28, 1999, after had become expendable since the Rams had signed Adam Timmerman to play right guard.

=== Jacksonville Jaguars ===
Wiegert played four seasons with the Jacksonville Jaguars from 1999 to 2002. He signed as a free agent May 5, 1999, with the Jaguars in 1999. That season, he played in 16 games with 12 starts at right guard for the 14–2 Jaguars. In 2000, he started eight games at right tackle before suffering a torn anterior cruciate ligament in left knee. He had allowed only four sacks in eight games. He was placed on injured reserve on October 14, 2000. In 2001, he came back from injury to start all 16 games at right guard, the first time he had been able to do so since 1996. Wiegert played and started in seven games in 2002 before being placed on injured reserve on 11/6/2002. He made his first NFL start at left tackle versus Indianapolis and started four more games at left tackle before starting two games at right tackle. He was granted unconditional free agency on February 28, 2003.

=== Houston Texans ===
He played for the Houston Texans from 2003 to 2006. He signed by Texans on March 1, 2003. In 2003, he played in 15 games, starting 14 at right guard. In 2005, he started 12 games (five at right guard, seven at right tackle). The following season, 2006, he played in and started nine games at right tackle. On February 28, 2007, the Texans released Wiegert.
