= Charles Johnson (wide receiver, born 1972) =

American football player (1972–2022)

No. 81, 89
- Position: Wide receiver

Personal information
- Born: January 3, 1972; San Bernardino, California, U.S.
- Died: July 17, 2022 (aged 50); Wake Forest, North Carolina, U.S.
- Listed height: 6 ft 0 in (1.83 m)
- Listed weight: 205 lb (93 kg)

Career information
- High school: Cajon (San Bernardino)
- College: Colorado
- NFL draft: 1994: 1st round, 17th overall pick

Career history
- Pittsburgh Steelers (1994–1998); Philadelphia Eagles (1999–2000); New England Patriots (2001); Buffalo Bills (2002)

Awards and highlights
- Super Bowl champion (XXXVI); National champion (1990); Second-team All-American (1993); Big Eight Offensive Player of the Year (1993); First-team All-Big Eight (1993); Second-team All-Big Eight (1992)

Career NFL statistics
- Receptions: 354
- Receiving yards: 4,606
- Receiving touchdowns: 24
- Stats at Pro Football Reference

Charles Everett Johnson (January 3, 1972 – July 17, 2022) was an American professional football player who was a wide receiver for nine seasons in the National Football League (NFL). He played college football for the Colorado Buffaloes, earning All-American honors in 1993. He played in the NFL for the Pittsburgh Steelers, Philadelphia Eagles, New England Patriots, and Buffalo Bills from 1994 to 2002.

== Early life ==
Johnson was born in San Bernardino, California, on January 3, 1972. He attended Cajon High School in his hometown, and was awarded the Ken Hubbs award for 1990. He then studied at the University of Colorado Boulder where he played college football for the Colorado Buffaloes. He also served as president of the Black Student Alliance and ran unsuccessfully for student body president, after being disqualified on account of being a continuing education student who had not yet paid his university fees. However, his name stayed on the ballot because the voting lists could not be changed in time and he received the most votes, with the result annulled by the university's election commissioner three days later. Johnson was drafted by the Pittsburgh Steelers in the first round (17th overall selection) of the 1994 NFL draft.

== Professional career ==
Pre-draft measurables
Height	Weight	Arm length	Hand span
6 ft 0 1/4 in (1.84 m)	188 lb (85 kg)	32 in (0.81 m)	9 1/4 in (0.23 m)
All values from NFL Combine

Johnson made his NFL debut with the Steelers on September 4, 1994, at the age of 22, in a 26–9 loss to the Dallas Cowboys. He played in 16 games (9 starts) during his rookie season and made the seventh-longest reception in the NFL that year (84 yards). He was on the Steelers' injured reserve when the team reached the Super Bowl XXX the following year, losing 27–17 to the Cowboys. During the 1996 season, Johnson finished tenth in the league in yards per reception (16.8), and led the franchise in receiving yards (1008), the only 1,000-yard season in his career. He recorded career-highs in touchdown catches (7) and receptions (65) two years later. He joined the Philadelphia Eagles as an unrestricted free agent on a five-year, $15 million contract at the conclusion of the 1998 season.

In his first season with the Eagles, Johnson was tied for the most safeties in the NFL (1). He went on to start in all 27 games during his two seasons with the franchise, leading the Eagles with 7 touchdown catches in 2000 (tying his career-high), and finishing second in receptions (56) that year. After being released by the team in April 2001, he signed with the New England Patriots and won a Super Bowl ring when the team upset the St. Louis Rams to win its first league championship. He then played his final year in the NFL with the Buffalo Bills before retiring at the end of the 2002 season.

== NFL career statistics ==
Year	Team	Games		Receiving					Rushing					Punt returns					Kickoff returns				
Year	Team	GP	GS	Rec	Yds	Avg	Lng	TD	Att	Yds	Avg	Lng	TD	Ret	Yds	Avg	Lng	TD	Ret	Yds	Avg	Lng	TD
1994	PIT	16	9	38	577	15.2	84	3	4	-1	-0.3	7	0	15	90	6.0	15	0	16	345	12.6	71	0
1995	PIT	15	10	38	432	11.4	33	0	1	-10	-10.0	-10	0	—	—	—	—	0	2	47	23.5	40	0
1996	PIT	16	12	60	1,008	16.8	70	3	—	—	—	—	0	—	—	—	—	0	6	111	18.5	31	0
1997	PIT	13	11	46	568	12.3	49	2	—	—	—	—	0	—	—	—	—	0	—	—	—	—	0
1998	PIT	16	16	65	815	12.5	55	7	1	4	4.0	4	0	—	—	—	—	0	—	—	—	—	0
1999	PHI	11	11	34	414	12.2	36	1	—	—	—	—	0	1	0	0.0	0	0	—	—	—	—	0
2000	PHI	16	16	56	642	11.5	59	7	5	18	3.6	15	0	—	—	—	—	0	—	—	—	—	0
2001	NE	14	2	14	111	7.9	24	1	—	—	—	—	0	—	—	—	—	0	—	—	—	—	0
2002	BUF	16	0	3	39	13.0	22	0	—	—	—	—	0	—	—	—	—	0	—	—	—	—	0
Career		133	87	354	4,606	13.0	84	24	11	11	1.0	15	1	16	90	5.6	15	0	24	503	21.0	71	0

== Later life and death ==
After retiring from professional football, Johnson was employed as an assistant athletic director at Heritage High School in Wake Forest, North Carolina, working with other retired NFL players including Dewayne Washington (head coach), Willie Parker, and Torry Holt (fellow assistants). Johnson died on July 17, 2022, at the age of 50. The death was ruled a suicide after apparently overdosing on drugs, according to a report released January 2023 by the state medical examiner's office in North Carolina.
