= 1996 Buffalo Bills season =

37th season in franchise history; final one with Jim Kelly

- Owner: Ralph Wilson
- General manager: John Butler
- Head coach: Marv Levy
- Offensive coordinator: Tom Bresnahan
- Defensive coordinator: Wade Phillips
- Home stadium: Rich Stadium

Results
- Record: 10–6
- Division place: 2nd AFC East
- Playoffs: Lost Wild Card Playoffs (vs. Jaguars) 27–30
- All-Pros: Bruce Smith (1st team)
- Pro Bowlers: 4: DE Bruce Smith; DT Bryce Paup; G Ruben Brown; DT Ted Washington

The 1996 season was the Buffalo Bills' 27th in the National Football League (NFL), their 37th overall (all of those under the ownership of Ralph Wilson) and their 10th full season under head coach Marv Levy. It was also the final season for long-time Bills quarterback Jim Kelly.

The team matched their previous season's record of 10–6 and qualified for the playoffs, for the second consecutive season and eighth time in nine seasons. The Bills were upset at home in the wild card playoffs by the 9–7 Jacksonville Jaguars, 30–27. The game winner was a 45-yard field goal from future Bills kicker Mike Hollis, sealing the agonizing defeat. This was the last time the Bills hosted a playoff game until 2020.

== Offseason ==
Additions	Subtractions
LB Chris Spielman (Lions)	LB Cornelius Bennett (Falcons)
WR Quinn Early (Saints)	WR Bill Brooks (Redskins)
DT Shawn Price (Panthers)	FB Carwell Gardner (Ravens)
	FS Matt Darby (Cardinals)

=== NFL draft ===
1996 Buffalo Bills draft
Round	Pick	Player	Position	College	Notes
1	24	Eric Moulds *	WR	Mississippi State	
2	53	Gabe Northern	DE	LSU	Pick from CHI
3	80	Matt Stevens	SS	Appalachian State	
4	120	Sean Moran	DE	Colorado State	
5	156	Ray Jackson	DB	Colorado State	
6	196	Leon Neal	RB	TCU	
7	237	Dan Bradenburg	DE	Indiana State	
6	202	Dusty Zeigler	C	Notre Dame	
7	244	Jay Riemersma	TE	Michigan	
7	249	Eric Smedley	DB	Indiana	
Made roster † Pro Football Hall of Fame * Made at least one Pro Bowl during career

Mississippi State wide receiver Eric Moulds went on to be the second-leading receiver in Bills history (behind only Andre Reed), with 675 catches for 9,096 yards. He was elected to three Pro Bowls, in 1998, 2000 and 2002.

=== Undrafted free agents ===
1996 undrafted free agents of note
Player	Position	College
Dennis Allen	Defensive back	Texas A&M
Armando Avin	Kicker	Nevada
Jason Bratton	Running back	Grambling State
Tim Colston	Defensive Tackle	Kansas State
Robert Deshotel	Linebacker	LSU
Matt Meservey	Guard	BYU
Mike Maxwell	Quarterback	Nevada
Mike Rockwood	Tackle	Nevada
Harry Van Hofwegen	Defensive end	Carleton

== Personnel ==
=== Staff/coaches ===
1996 Buffalo Bills staff
Front office: Owner/President – Ralph Wilson; Executive vice president of administration/general manager – John Butler; Assistant general manager/director of pro personnel – Bob Ferguson; Director of player personnel – Dwight Adams; Assistant director/collegiate scouting – A. J. Smith; Alumni Relations / Director of Player Development - Jerry Butler; Coaching staff: Vice president for football operations/head coach – Marv Levy; Assistant Head Coach - Elijah Pitts; Administrative assistant to the head coach – Chuck Lester	Offensive coaches: Offensive coordinator/offensive line – Tom Bresnahan; Quarterbacks - Jim Shofner; Running backs – Elijah Pitts; Receivers – Charlie Joiner; Offensive quality control/tight ends – Don Lawrence; Defensive coaches: Defensive Coordinator– Wade Phillips; Defensive line – Don Sekanovich; Linebackers - Ted Cottrell; Assistant linebackers coach – Chuck Lester; Defensive backs – Dick Roach; Special teams: Special teams – Bruce DeHaven; Strength & conditioning: Strength and conditioning coordinator – Rusty Jones

=== Roster ===
1996 Buffalo Bills roster
Quarterbacks (QB): 15 Todd Collins; 12 Jim Kelly; 10 Alex Van Pelt; Running backs (RB): 45 Carey Bender; 29 Jason Bratton; 44 Darick Holmes; 34 Thurman Thomas; 33 Tim Tindale FB; Wide receivers (WR): 82 Chris Brantley; 85 Russell Copeland; 88 Quinn Early; 80 Eric Moulds KR; 83 Andre Reed; 89 Steve Tasker WR; Tight ends (TE): 86 Tony Cline; 87 Rob Coons; 49 Jay Riemersma; 84 Lonnie Johnson	Offensive linemen (OL): 79 Ruben Brown G; 70 John Fina T; 67 Kent Hull C; 72 Corey Louchiey T; 60 Jerry Ostroski T; 74 Glenn Parker G; 61 Dusty Zeigler C; Defensive linemen (DL): 90 Phil Hansen DE; 77 Jim Jeffcoat NT; 98 Sean Moran DE; 94 Mark Pike DE; 91 Shawn Price DE; 78 Bruce Smith DE; 92 Ted Washington NT	Linebackers (LB): 96 Dan Brandenburg OLB; 57 Damien Covington ILB; 55 Mark Maddox ILB; 99 Gabe Northern OLB; 95 Bryce Paup OLB; 58 Marlo Perry ILB; 59 Sam Rogers OLB; 54 Chris Spielman ILB; 51 David White OLB; Defensive backs (DB): 22 Jeff Burris CB/PR; 27 Ken Irvin CB; 31 Raymond Jackson CB; 46 Marlon Kerner CB; 21 Manny Martin CB/S; 24 Kurt Schulz FS; 40 Eric Smedley FS; 28 Thomas Smith CB; 23 Matt Stevens SS; Special teams (ST): 76 Ethan Albright LS; 2 Steve Christie K; 9 Chris Mohr P	Practice squad: 62 Dave Hack G; 93 Jerold Jeffcoat NT; 73 Mike Rockwood T; Reserve: 81 Justin Armour WR (IR); 52 John Holecek LB (IR); 20 Henry Jones SS (IR); 68 Corbin Lacina G (IR); 53 active, 4 inactive, 3 practice squad Rookies in italics

== Preseason ==
=== Schedule ===
Week	Date	Opponent	Result	Record	Venue	Recap
1	August 2	Washington Redskins	L 7–17	0–1	Rich Stadium	Recap
2	August 8	at Minnesota Vikings	W 35–12	1–1	Hubert H. Humphrey Metrodome	Recap
3	August 17	at Carolina Panthers	W 24–0	2–1	Ericsson Stadium	Recap
4	August 23	Baltimore Ravens	L 14–37	2–2	Rich Stadium	Recap

== Regular season ==
=== Schedule ===
Week	Date	Opponent	Result	Record	Venue	Recap
1	September 1	at New York Giants	**W** 23–20 (OT)	1–0	Giants Stadium	Recap
2	September 8	**New England Patriots**	**W** 17–10	2–0	Rich Stadium	Recap
3	September 16	at Pittsburgh Steelers	**L** 6–24	2–1	Three Rivers Stadium	Recap
4	September 22	Dallas Cowboys	**W** 10–7	3–1	Rich Stadium	Recap
5	Bye					
6	October 6	**Indianapolis Colts**	**W** 16–13 (OT)	4–1	Rich Stadium	Recap
7	October 13	**Miami Dolphins**	**L** 7–21	4–2	Rich Stadium	Recap
8	October 20	at **New York Jets**	**W** 25–22	5–2	Giants Stadium	Recap
9	October 27	at **New England Patriots**	**L** 25–28	5–3	Foxboro Stadium	Recap
10	November 3	Washington Redskins	**W** 38–13	6–3	Rich Stadium	Recap
11	November 10	at Philadelphia Eagles	**W** 24–17	7–3	Veterans Stadium	Recap
12	November 17	Cincinnati Bengals	**W** 31–17	8–3	Rich Stadium	Recap
13	November 24	**New York Jets**	**W** 35–10	9–3	Rich Stadium	Recap
14	December 1	at **Indianapolis Colts**	**L** 10–13 (OT)	9–4	RCA Dome	Recap
15	December 8	at Seattle Seahawks	**L** 18–26	9–5	Kingdome	Recap
16	December 16	at **Miami Dolphins**	**L** 14–16	9–6	Pro Player Stadium	Recap
17	December 22	Kansas City Chiefs	**W** 20–9	10–6	Rich Stadium	Recap
Note: Intra-division opponents are in **bold** text.

== Game summaries ==
=== Week 1 ===
Team	1	2	3	4	OT	Total
• Bills	0	7	10	3	3	23
Giants	3	14	3	0	0	20

- Date: September 1
- Location: Giants Stadium, East Rutherford, New Jersey
- Game start: 8:00 p.m.
- Game attendance: 74,218
- Game weather: 72 °F (22 °C) • 9 miles per hour (14 km/h; 7.8 kn)
- Referee: Gary Lane
- TV announcers (NFL on TNT): Verne Lundquist, and Pat Haden

Scoring summary
1	NYG	Brad Daluiso 22 yard field goal	Giants 3–0
2	NYG	Amani Toomer 87 yard punt return (Brad Daluiso kick)	Giants 10–0
2	NYG	Charles Way 37 yard pass from Dave Brown (Brad Daluiso kick)	Giants 17–0
2	BUF	Thurman Thomas 1 yard run (Steve Christie kick)	Giants 17–7
3	NYG	Brad Daluiso 34 yard field goal	Giants 20–7
3	BUF	Steve Christie 28 yard field goal	Giants 20–10
3	BUF	Andre Reed 60 yard pass from Jim Kelly (Steve Christie kick)	Giants 20–17
4	BUF	Steve Christie 39 yard field goal	Tie 20–20
OT	BUF	Steve Christie 34 yard field goal	Bills 23–20

=== Week 2 ===
The Bills upended the Patriots 17–10. Quinn Early caught a 63-yard touchdown in the fourth quarter for Buffalo, then the Bills stopped the Patriots inside their five-yard line in the final seconds.

=== Week 3 ===
The Bills' first Monday Night appearance ended in ugly fashion as the Steelers erupted to more rushing yards (222 with two touchdowns from ex-Ram Jerome Bettis) than the Bills had total yards of offense (185). Carnell Lake picked off Jim Kelly and ran back a 47-yard score, part of a 24–6 Steelers win.

Team	1	2	3	4	Total
Bills	3	0	3	0	6
• Steelers	7	17	0	0	24

- Date: September 16
- Location: Three Rivers Stadium, Pittsburgh, PA
- Game start: 9:00 p.m. EST
- Game attendance: 59,002
- Game weather: 57 °F (14 °C) • 6 miles per hour (9.7 km/h; 5.2 kn)
- Referee: Larry Nemmers
- TV announcers (ABC Monday Night Football): Al Michaels, Frank Gifford, Dan Dierdorf, and Lynn Swann(on field reporting)

=== Week 4 ===
The Bills hosted the defending Super Bowl champs who were 1–2 and fell to 1–3 as Buffalo rushed for 135 yards and a Thurman Thomas score while intercepting Troy Aikman three times; the last came in the final minute, and Aikman was tackled awkwardly by Bruce Smith, necessitating a Monday examination of his ankle. Jim Kelly was injured, as Todd Collins was the starting quarterback for Buffalo.

Team	1	2	3	4	Total
Cowboys	0	0	0	7	7
• Bills	7	0	3	0	10

- Date: September 22
- Location: Rich Stadium, Orchard Park, New York
- Game start: 1:00 p.m. EST
- Game attendance: 78,098
- Game weather: 61 °F (16 °C) • 12 miles per hour (19 km/h; 10 kn)
- Referee: Dale Hamer
- TV announcers (Fox NFL): Pat Summerall, John Madden

=== Week 5 ===
Bye week

=== Week 6 ===
The Bills hosted the Colts, the league's last undefeated team. They clawed to a 10-3 lead in the second as Todd Collins (quarterback) threw his first NFL touchdown pass of his career. Marshall Faulk's touchdown in the fourth tied the game; an exchange of field goals put the game into overtime tied 13-13 where Steve Christie won it from 39 yards out.

Vegas Line: Buffalo Bills -3.5

Starting QBs: Indianapolis Colts: Jim Harbaugh / Buffalo Bills: Todd Collins (quarterback)

Indianapolis Colts (4-0) at Buffalo Bills (3-1)

Team	1	2	3	4	OT	Total
Colts	0	0	3	10	0	13
• Bills	0	7	3	3	3	16

- Date: October 6, 1996
- Location: Rich Stadium, Orchard Park, New York
- Game start: 4:00 p.m. EST
- Game attendance: 79,401
- Game weather: 52 °F (11 °C) • 8 miles per hour (13 km/h; 7.0 kn)
- Referee: Red Cashion
- TV announcers (NFL on NBC): Tom Hammond and Bob Trumpy

Scoring summary

Quarter	Time	Drive			Team	Scoring information	Score	
Quarter	Time	Plays	Yards	TOP	Team	Scoring information	IND	BUF
2	9:42	10	80	5:01	Bills	Andre Reed 30-yard touchdown reception from Todd Collins (quarterback), Steve Christie kick good	0	7
3	9:59	5	69	1:05	Bills	42-yard field goal by Steve Christie	0	10
3	7:16	8	50	2:43	Colts	44-yard field goal by Cary Blanchard	3	10
4	14:57	11	81	5:11	Colts	Marshall Faulk 1-yard touchdown run, Cary Blanchard kick good	10	10
4	8:25	6	16	2:39	Colts	41-yard field goal by Cary Blanchard	13	10
4	0:15	11	54	1:46	Bills	37-yard field goal by Steve Christie	13	13
OT	5:42	9	26	4:20	Bills	39-yard field goal by Steve Christie	13	16
"TOP" = time of possession. For other American football terms, see Glossary of American football.							13	16

Team	Category	Player	Statistics
Colts	Passing	Jim Harbaugh	17/42, 203 yards, 0 TD, 0 INT
Colts	Rushing	Marshall Faulk	20 carries, 55 yards, 1 TD
Colts	Receiving	Marvin Harrison	5 receptions, 88 yards
Bills	Passing	Todd Collins (quarterback)	23/44, 309 yards, 1 TD, 0 INT
Bills	Rushing	Thurman Thomas	18 carries, 69 yards
Bills	Receiving	Thurman Thomas	8 receptions, 111 yards

Statistics	Colts	Bills
First downs	16	20
Plays–yards	72-249	78-412
Rushes–yards	30-86	34-113
Passing yards	163	299
Passing: comp–att–int	17-42-0	23-44-0
Turnovers		
Time of possession	34:32	34:50

=== Week 7 ===
Craig Erickson started for Dan Marino and the Dolphins led 14–7 late in the fourth on scores by Irving Spikes and Karim Abdul-Jabbar. Kelly completed a deep pass to Andre Reed and Reed was stopped at the 1-yard line by Terrell Buckley; the Dolphins held the Bills on the first three downs and Kelly was flagged for intentional grounding, forcing 4th and goal from the 11; Kelly's pass was picked off by Buckley at the 9 and Buckley ran back a 91-yard score. Reacting to fan booing after the 21–7 loss, a disconsolate Kelly said, "We deserved to be booed."

=== Week 8 ===
The Bills traveled to face the 0–7 New York Jets and kicker Steve Christie had a major workload as he booted five field goals to support a Darick Holmes score and to offset three touchdowns by ex-Bill Frank Reich (two to Keyshawn Johnson, one to Wayne Chrebet) and a two-point conversion to Kyle Brady. Christie's sixth field goal finished off a 25–22 Bills win.

Buffalo Bills (4-2) at New York Jets (0-7)

Team	1	2	3	4	Total
• Bills	3	3	3	16	25
Jets	7	0	8	7	22

- Date: October 20
- Location: Giants Stadium, East Rutherford, New Jersey
- Game start: 4:00 PM EST
- Game attendance: 49,775
- Game weather: 55 °F (13 °C) • 10 miles per hour (16 km/h; 8.7 kn)
- Referee: Walt Coleman
- TV announcers (NFL on NBC): Charlie Jones (sportscaster), and Randy Cross

=== Week 9 ===
On Sunday Night the Bills traveled to Foxboro Stadium and the ensuing game left them tied with the Patriots and Colts for the AFC East lead at 5–3. After trailing 13–0 the Bills clawed back despite a safety given up on an endzone penalty against Jim Kelly; the Bills led 18–15 in the fourth. With 1:25 to go Curtis Martin scored but Adam Vinatieri missed the PAT. Kelly was then intercepted by Willie McGinest and McGinest ran back a 46-yard score, but the Bills on a 48-yard score to Andre Reed pulled to within 28–25 with 30 seconds left; the ensuing onside kick was recovered by ex-Dolphin recently signed by the Patriots Keith Byars.

Team	1	2	3	4	Total
Bills	0	0	10	15	25
• Patriots	7	6	2	13	28

- Date: October 27
- Location: Foxboro Stadium - Foxborough, Massachusetts
- Game start: 8:00 PM EST
- Game attendance: 58,858
- Game weather: 54 °F (12 °C) • 8 miles per hour (13 km/h; 7.0 kn)
- Referee: Dick Hantak
- TV announcers (NFL on TNT): Verne Lundquist, and Pat Haden

=== Week 10 ===
The Bills hosted the Washington Redskins and Darick Holmes had the game of his career as the Bills rushed for 266 yards (outgaining the entirety of the Skins offense by 28 yards) and five scores, four of them by Holmes. The Bills reached 6–3 with the 38–13 win while the Skins' seven-game winning streak crashed to a halt.

=== Week 11 ===
The Bills finished the NFC East portion of their schedule by upending the Eagles 24–17, thus sweeping the NFC East 4-0. Despite being outgained in total yards (385 to 252) the Bills forced two Eagles fumbles and also scored on a blocked punt.

Starting QBs: BUF=Jim Kelly vs PHI=Ty Detmer

Head Coach: BUF=Marv Levy vs PHI=Ray Rhodes

Vegas Line= Philadelphia Eagles -3.5

Buffalo Bills (6-3) at Philadelphia Eagles (7-2)

Team	1	2	3	4	Total
• Bills	7	10	7	0	24
Eagles	10	0	0	7	17

- Date: November 10, 1996
- Location: Veterans Stadium, Philadelphia, Pennsylvania
- Game start: 1:00 p.m. EST
- Game attendance: 66,613
- Game weather: 42 °F (6 °C) • 12 miles per hour (19 km/h; 10 kn)
- Referee: Johnny Grier
- TV announcers (NFL on NBC): Charlie Jones (sportscaster) and Randy Cross

Scoring summary

Quarter	Time	Drive			Team	Scoring information	Score	
Quarter	Time	Plays	Yards	TOP	Team	Scoring information	BUF	PHI
1	10:22	7	74	3:16	Eagles	Kevin Turner (running back) 23-yard touchdown reception from Ty Detmer, Gary Anderson (placekicker) kick good	0	7
1	8:31	1	18	0:07	Bills	Tom Hutton (American football) punt blocked by Gabe Northern 18 yard TD return (Steve Christie kick)	7	7
1	1:20	15	70	7:11	Eagles	23-yard field goal by Gary Anderson (placekicker)	7	10
2	2:23	16	64	7:31	Bills	Thurman Thomas 5-yard touchdown run, Steve Christie kick good	14	10
2	0:36	8	47	1:06	Bills	38-yard field goal by Steve Christie	17	10
3	1:16	15	74	6:44	Bills	Quinn Early 5-yard touchdown reception from Jim Kelly, Steve Christie kick good	24	10
4	10:27	9	67	5:26	Eagles	Irving Fryar 10-yard touchdown reception from Ty Detmer, kick good	24	17
"TOP" = time of possession. For other American football terms, see Glossary of American football.							24	17

=== Week 12 ===
The 4-6 Bengals came to Rich Stadium on a three-game winning streak after the firing of David Shula and promotion of Bruce Coslet to head coach. The Bills didn't care as they rushed for 134 yards and touchdowns from Jim Kelly and Thurman Thomas; the Bills led 31-7 in the fourth as the Bengals scored ten points, but could get no further as Buffalo won 31-17.

=== Week 13 ===
The Bills hosted the 1–11 Jets and erupted to a 28–3 lead by the fourth quarter; after a Frank Reich touchdown to Jeff Graham the Bills scored again on Eric Moulds' 97-yard kickoff return. The 35–10 win left the Bills at 9–3 entering a three-game road trip.

=== Week 14 ===
Starting a three-game road trip, the Bills traveled to Indianapolis where despite 307 yards of offense fell to the Colts 13-10 in overtime. Todd Collins started and was intercepted twice as the Colts forced overtime and won on Cary Blanchard's 49-yard field goal. The Colts started backup QB Paul Justin for this game as well.

Team	1	2	3	4	OT	Total
Bills	0	10	0	0	0	10
• Colts	7	0	0	3	3	13

- Date: December 1
- Location: RCA Dome - Indianapolis, Indiana
- Game start: 1:00 PM EST
- Game attendance: 53,804
- Game weather: DOME
- Referee: Jerry Markbreit
- TV announcers (NFL on NBC): Marv Albert, and Sam Wyche

=== Week 15 ===
The Bills traveled to the Kingdome where Seahawks kicker Todd Peterson booted four field goals while Kelly and Todd Collins combined for two touchdowns and three interceptions. Buffalo's five turnovers were key as Rick Mirer won 26-18 despite only nine completions of 23 attempts.

=== Week 16 ===
On Monday Night Football Buffalo's three-game road trip came up empty as the Bills fell to the Dolphins at Joe Robbie Stadium. Joe Nedney booted three field goals and Dan Marino had one touchdown. Jim Kelly had two scores but was picked off once. I was the first time the Bills had been swept by the Dolphins since 1986.

=== Week 17 vs Chiefs ===
Week 17: Kansas City Chiefs at Buffalo Bills – Game summary

Quarter	1	2	3	4	Total
Chiefs	3	3	3	0	9
Bills	0	3	3	14	20

at Rich Stadium, Orchard Park, New York

- Date: December 22
- Game time: 1:00 p.m. EST/12:00 p.m. CST
- Game weather: Light snow, 33 °F (1 °C)
- Game attendance: 68,671
- Referee: Gerry Austin
- TV announcers (NBC): Marv Albert, Sam Wyche and Jim Gray
- Recap, Game Book

Game information

First quarter

- KC – Pete Stoyanovich 19-yard field goal, 5:18. Chiefs 3–0. Drive: 12 plays, 72 yards, 6:52.

Second quarter

- KC – Pete Stoyanovich 24-yard field goal, 10:46. Chiefs 6–0. Drive: 7 plays, 9 yards, 4:07.
- BUF – Steve Christie 41-yard field goal, 2:54. Chiefs 6–3. Drive: 8 plays, 32 yards, 3:14.

Third quarter

- KC – Pete Stoyanovich 26-yard field goal, 11:22. Chiefs 9–3. Drive: 7 plays, 19 yards, 3:25.
- BUF – Steve Christie 42-yard field goal, 2:16. Chiefs 9–6. Drive: 6 plays, 26 yards, 2:20.

Fourth quarter

- BUF – Tony Cline 4-yard pass from Jim Kelly (Steve Christie kick), 12:23. Bills 13–9. Drive: 6 plays, 72 yards, 2:42.
- BUF – Quinn Early 4-yard pass from Jim Kelly (Steve Christie kick), 4:13. Bills 20–9. Drive: 6 plays, 41 yards, 2:55.

Top passers

- KC – Steve Bono – 14/28, 138 yards, 2 INT
- BUF – Jim Kelly – 20/29, 279 yards, 2 TD, INT

Top rushers

- KC – Marcus Allen – 20 rushes, 87 yards
- BUF – Thurman Thomas – 17 rushes, 43 yards

Top receivers

- KC – Kimble Anders – 7 receptions, 49 yards
- BUF – Steve Tasker – 4 receptions, 87 yards

External videos
- 1996 Chiefs at Bills – NBC game broadcast
- 1996 Chiefs at Bills – NFL Primetime

The Bills hosted the Chiefs with both teams needing the win to make the playoffs. Steve Bono was harassed all game long and held to just 138 yards with two picks. Jim Kelly rallied the Bills from down 9-6 with two touchdowns. The 20-9 win put the Bills into the playoffs as the AFC Wildcard home team while the Chiefs failed to reach the playoffs for the first time in the decade; it was Kansas City's fourth loss in the last five meetings with Buffalo.

== Playoffs ==
Playoff round	Date	Opponent (seed)	Result	Record	Venue	NFL.com recap
Wild Card	December 28	Jacksonville Jaguars (5)	L 27–30	0–1	Rich Stadium	Recap

The first-ever playoff game for the second-year Jaguars saw the game lead tie or change nine times. Natrone Means rushed for 175 yards and a touchdown while Mark Brunell threw for 239 yards, a score, and two interceptions; in the fourth Jeff Burris ran back a 38-yard score off a Brunell pick. The Jaguars rallied with two fourth-quarter scoring drives ending in a 45-yard field goal from future Bills kicker Mike Hollis. The game turned out to be the last home playoff game for the Bills until the 2020 season and the last home playoff game loss for the Bills until the 2022 season.

== Standings ==
AFC East
	W	L	T	PCT	PF	PA	STK
^{(2)} New England Patriots	11	5	0	.688	418	313	W1
^{(4)} Buffalo Bills	10	6	0	.625	319	266	W1
^{(6)} Indianapolis Colts	9	7	0	.563	317	334	L1
Miami Dolphins	8	8	0	.500	339	325	W2
New York Jets	1	15	0	.063	279	454	L7
