= 1998 Buffalo Bills season =

39th season in franchise history

- Owner: Ralph Wilson
- General manager: John Butler
- Head coach: Wade Phillips
- Home stadium: Ralph Wilson Stadium

Results
- Record: 10–6
- Division place: 3rd AFC East
- Playoffs: Lost Wild Card Playoffs (at Dolphins) 17–24
- Pro Bowlers: QB Doug Flutie; FB Sam Gash; WR Eric Moulds; G Ruben Brown; DE Bruce Smith; DT Ted Washington

The 1998 Buffalo Bills season was the team's 39th season, and 29th in the National Football League (NFL). The season marked an important development in the Bills’ history as a quarterback controversy would consume the whole season between Rob Johnson and Doug Flutie. It would also mark the beginning of the Wade Phillips era. The Bills improved on the previous season's output of 6–10, and finished third in the AFC East with a 10–6 record, and would qualify for the playoffs only to lose in the wild card round to the Miami Dolphins.

The Bills lost their first three games of the season, all by six points or less, and looked to be headed for a losing season. After a bye in Week Four, quarterback Rob Johnson finally won his first game with Buffalo, holding on for a 26–21 win over San Francisco in Week Five. Flutie started the next eleven games, winning nine of them. The Bills had a playoff spot locked up by the final game of the season, which Johnson started and won.

The Bills played the Dolphins in the Wild Card round of the 1998 AFC Playoffs, where wide receiver Eric Moulds would set the NFL playoff record for receiving yards, with 240. The Bills would end up losing the game 24–17, as Dolphins lineman Trace Armstrong sacked Flutie on Buffalo's last drive, forcing him to fumble, and icing the game for Miami.

== Offseason ==
The Bills, looking to upgrade the quarterback position, signed Rob Johnson, who had played for Jacksonville in 1997, and improved his stock with a win in relief of Jaguars quarterback Mark Brunell. Bills general manager John Butler traded away the Bills' first- and fourth-round picks to Jacksonville for the rights to Johnson.

The Bills also signed long-time CFL quarterback Doug Flutie to back up Johnson; Flutie would end the 1998 season with the NFL Comeback Player of the Year Award.

| Additions | Subtractions |
|---|---|
| QB Rob Johnson (Jaguars) | WR Steve Tasker (retirement) |
| QB Doug Flutie (CFL) | QB Todd Collins (Chiefs) |
| G Joe Panos (Eagles) | LB Bryce Paup (Jaguars) |
| | G Corbin Lacina (Panthers) |

=== NFL draft ===
1998 Buffalo Bills draft
| Round | Pick | Player | Position | College | Notes |
| 2 | 39 | Sam Cowart * | Linebacker | Florida State | |
| 3 | 68 | Robert Hicks | Offensive tackle | Mississippi State | |
| 5 | 131 | Jonathan Linton | Fullback | North Carolina | |
| 6 | 160 | Fred Coleman | Wide receiver | Washington | |
| 7 | 198 | Victor Allotey | Guard | Indiana | |
| 7 | 238 | Kamil Loud | Wide receiver | Cal-Poly SLO | |
Made roster * Made at least one Pro Bowl during career

=== Undrafted free agents ===
1998 undrafted free agents of note
| Player | Position | College |
|---|---|---|
| Jason Crebo | Linebacker | Montana |
| Shane Doyle | Defensive end | Washington State |
| James Grier | Defensive tackle | Mississippi State |
| Raymond Hill | Defensive back | Michigan State |
| Herb Howard | Defensive tackle | Virginia State |
| Todd Kollar | Offensive tackle | Youngstown State |
| Carl McCullough | Running back | Wisconsin |
| Hardy Mitchell | Defensive tackle | Buffalo |
| David Mudge | Offensive tackle | Michigan State |
| Mark Nohra | Running back | British Columbia |
| Willie Rodgers | Linebacker | Florida |
| Jerry Ross | Tight end | Pittsburg State |
| Hassan Shamsid-Deen | Defensive back | NC State |
| Adrion Smith | Defensive back | Southwest Missouri State |
| Duane Stewart | Defensive back | Washington State |
| Paul Turner | Wide receiver | Colorado State |
| Clarence "Pooh Bear" Williams | Running back | Florida State |
| Dan Williams | Center | Wofford |
| Undre Williams | Wide receiver | Florida A&M |

== Personnel ==
=== Staff ===
1998 Buffalo Bills staff
| Front office: President – Ralph Wilson; Executive vice-president/general manager – John Butler; Vice-president of football operations – Wade Phillips; Director of pro personnel – A. J. Smith; Director of player personnel – Dwight Adams; Head coaches: Head coach – Wade Phillips; Assistant to the Head Coach – Max Bowman; Offensive coaches: Offensive coordinator – Joe Pendry; Quarterbacks – Turk Schonert; Running backs – Bishop Harris; Receivers – Charlie Joiner; Tight ends – Max Bowman; Offensive line – Carl Mauck; Offensive quality control – Chris Dickson | Defensive coaches: Defensive coordinator – Ted Cottrell; Defensive line – John Levra; Linebackers – Chuck Lester; Defensive backs – Bill Bradley; Special teams coaches: Special teams – Bruce DeHaven; Strength and conditioning: Strength and conditioning Coordinator – Rusty Jones |

=== Roster ===
1998 Buffalo Bills roster
| Quarterbacks (QB): 7 Doug Flutie; 11 Rob Johnson; 10 Alex Van Pelt; Running backs (RB): 33 Sam Gash FB; 35 Jonathan Linton FB; 23 Antowain Smith; 34 Thurman Thomas; 39 Pooh Bear Williams FB; Wide receivers (WR): 88 Quinn Early; 89 Kamil Loud; 80 Eric Moulds; 83 Andre Reed; 82 Kevin Williams; Tight ends (TE): 84 Lonnie Johnson; 85 Jay Riemersma | Offensive linemen (OL): 66 Victor Allotey G; 79 Ruben Brown G; 63 Bill Conaty C; 70 John Fina T; 77 Robert Hicks T; 74 Jamie Nails G; 60 Jerry Ostroski T; 72 Joe Panos G; 70 Marcus Spriggs T; 61 Dusty Zeigler C; Defensive linemen (DL): 90 Phil Hansen DE; 94 Mark Pike DE; 91 Shawn Price DE; 78 Bruce Smith DE; 92 Ted Washington NT; 75 Marcellus Wiley DE; 93 Pat Williams NT | Linebackers (LB): 96 Dan Brandenburg OLB; 51 Joe Cummings ILB; 56 Sam Cowart ILB; 52 John Holecek ILB; 98 Sean Moran ILB; 99 Gabe Northern OLB; 58 Marlo Perry ILB; 59 Sam Rogers OLB; 55 Wayne Simmons OLB; Defensive backs (DB): 25 Donovan Greer CB; 27 Ken Irvin CB; 31 Raymond Jackson CB; 20 Henry Jones SS; 21 Manny Martin FS; 22 Daryl Porter CB; 24 Kurt Schulz FS; 40 Eric Smedley SS; 28 Thomas Smith CB; Special teams (ST): 76 Ethan Albright LS; 2 Steve Christie K; 9 Chris Mohr P | Practice squad: 81 Fred Coleman WR; 71 Dave Mudge T; 86 Jerry Ross TE; 14 Undre Williams WR; Reserve: 13 Jim Ballard QB (IR); 46 Marlon Kerner CB (IR); 73 Mike Rockwood T (IR); 53 active, 3 inactive, 4 practice squad Rookies in italics |

== Regular season ==
The opening game for 1998 constituted the first time since 1985 that the Bills played the San Diego Chargers. The reason for this is that before the admission of the Texans in 2002, NFL scheduling formulas for games outside a team's division were much more influenced by table position during the previous season.

=== Schedule ===
| Week | Date | Opponent | Result | Record | Venue | Attendance |
|---|---|---|---|---|---|---|
| 1 | September 6 | at San Diego Chargers | **L** 14–16 | 0–1 | Qualcomm Stadium | 64,037 |
| 2 | September 13 | at **Miami Dolphins** | **L** 7–13 | 0–2 | Pro Player Stadium | 73,097 |
| 3 | September 20 | St. Louis Rams | **L** 33–34 | 0–3 | Ralph Wilson Stadium | 65,199 |
| 4 | Bye | | | | | |
| 5 | October 4 | San Francisco 49ers | **W** 26–21 | 1–3 | Ralph Wilson Stadium | 76,615 |
| 6 | October 11 | at **Indianapolis Colts** | **W** 31–24 | 2–3 | RCA Dome | 52,938 |
| 7 | October 18 | Jacksonville Jaguars | **W** 17–16 | 3–3 | Ralph Wilson Stadium | 77,635 |
| 8 | October 25 | at Carolina Panthers | **W** 30–14 | 4–3 | Ericcson Stadium | 64,050 |
| 9 | November 1 | **Miami Dolphins** | **W** 30–24 | 5–3 | Ralph Wilson Stadium | 79,011 |
| 10 | November 8 | at **New York Jets** | **L** 12–34 | 5–4 | Giants Stadium | 75,403 |
| 11 | November 15 | **New England Patriots** | **W** 13–10 | 6–4 | Ralph Wilson Stadium | 72,020 |
| 12 | November 22 | **Indianapolis Colts** | **W** 34–11 | 7–4 | Ralph Wilson Stadium | 49,032 |
| 13 | November 29 | at **New England Patriots** | **L** 21–25 | 7–5 | Foxboro Stadium | 58,304 |
| 14 | December 6 | at Cincinnati Bengals | **W** 33–20 | 8–5 | Cinergy Field | 54,359 |
| 15 | December 13 | Oakland Raiders | **W** 44–21 | 9–5 | Ralph Wilson Stadium | 62,002 |
| 16 | December 19 | **New York Jets** | **L** 10–17 | 9–6 | Ralph Wilson Stadium | 79,056 |
| 17 | December 27 | at New Orleans Saints | **W** 45–33 | 10–6 | Louisiana Superdome | 39,707 |
Note: Intra-division opponents are in **bold** text.

=== Week 1 ===
Starting QBs: Buffalo: Rob Johnson ** Johnson left with a concussion with the Bills trailing 10-0. **

San Diego Chargers: Ryan Leaf ** 1st NFL Start **

Vegas Line: San Diego Chargers -1.5

Over/Under:41.0 (under)

Buffalo Bills (0-0) at San Diego Chargers (0-0)

| Team | 1 | 2 | 3 | 4 | Total |
|---|---|---|---|---|---|
| Bills | 0 | 0 | 7 | 7 | 14 |
| • Chargers | 3 | 0 | 10 | 3 | 16 |

- Date: Sep 6, 1998
- Location: QUALCOMM Stadium, San Diego, California
- Game start: 4:15pm EST
- Game attendance: 64,037
- Game weather: 73 °F (23 °C) • 9 miles per hour (14 km/h; 7.8 kn)
- Referee: Ron Blum
- TV announcers (NFL on CBS): Gus Johnson (sportscaster) and Steve Tasker

Scoring summary

| Quarter | Time | Drive | | | Team | Scoring information | Score | |
| Quarter | Time | Plays | Yards | TOP | Team | Scoring information | BUF | SD |
|---|---|---|---|---|---|---|---|---|
| 1 | 1:06 | 9 | 45 | 5:19 | Chargers | 48-yard field goal by John Carney (American football) | 0 | 3 |
| 3 | 13:16 | 3 | 72 | 1:44 | Chargers | Bryan Still 6-yard touchdown reception from Ryan Leaf, John Carney (American football) kick good | 0 | 10 |
| 3 | 8:50 | 1 | 66 | 0:12 | Bills | Andre Reed 43-yard touchdown reception from Doug Flutie, Steve Christie kick good | 7 | 10 |
| 3 | 3:00 | 12 | 61 | 5:50 | Chargers | 47-yard field goal by John Carney (American football) | 7 | 13 |
| 4 | 9:05 | 8 | 31 | 4:52 | Bills | Andre Reed 5-yard touchdown reception from Doug Flutie, Steve Christie kick good | 14 | 13 |
| 4 | 4:30 | 9 | 28 | 4:35 | Chargers | 54-yard field goal by John Carney (American football) | 14 | 16 |
| "TOP" = time of possession. For other American football terms, see Glossary of American football. | | | | | | | 14 | 16 |

| Team | Category | Player | Statistics |
|---|---|---|---|
| Bills | Passing | Doug Flutie | 12/20, 158 yards, 2 TD, 1 INT |
| Bills | Rushing | Antowain Smith | 20 carries, 54 yards |
| Bills | Receiving | Andre Reed | 7 receptions, 94 yards, 2 TD |
| Chargers | Passing | Ryan Leaf | 16/31, 192 yards, 1 TD, 2 INT |
| Chargers | Rushing | Natrone Means | 15 carries, 57 yards |
| Chargers | Receiving | Bryan Still | 6 receptions, 128 yards, 1 TD |

| Statistics | Bills | Chargers |
|---|---|---|
| First downs | 20 | 14 |
| Plays–yards | 62-297 | 51-254 |
| Rushes–yards | 28-90 | 20-67 |
| Passing yards | 207 | 187 |
| Passing: comp–att–int | 20-34-2 | 16-31-2 |
| Turnovers | | |
| Time of possession | 33:08 | 26:52 |

=== Week 2 ===
Week 2 at Miami Dolphins

- Score: L 13-7
- Date: September 13, 1998
- Stadium: Pro Player Stadium, Miami FL
- Start Time: 1PM ET/10AM PT
- Attendance: 73,097
- Weather: 82 °F (28 °C), 10% chance of rain
- TV: CBS
- Announcers: Ian Eagle and Mark May

Week 3 vs St Louis Rams

- Score: L 33-34
- Date: September 20, 1998
- Stadium: Rich Stadium, Orchard Park, NY
- Start Time: 1PM ET/10AM PT
- Attendance: 65,199
- Weather: 72 °F (22 °C), sunny, wind 10 mph (16 km/h)
- TV: Fox
- Announcers: Kenny Albert and Tim Green

Week 4 Bye

Week 5 vs San Francisco 49ers

- Score: W 26-21
- Date: October 4, 1998
- Stadium: Rich Stadium, Orchard Park, NY
- Start Time: 1PM ET/10AM PT
- Attendance: 76,615
- Weather: 50 °F (10 °C), cloudy
- TV: Fox
- Announcers: Ray Bentley and Ron Pitts

Week 6 at Indianapolis Colts

- Score: W 31-24
- Date: October 11, 1998
- Stadium: RCA Dome, Indianapolis IN
- Start Time: 1PM ET/10AM PT
- Attendance: 52,938
- Weather: Dome
- TV: CBS
- Announcers: Bill Macatee and John Dockery

Week 7 vs Jacksonville Jaguars

- Score: W 17-16
- Date: October 18, 1998
- Stadium: Rich Stadium, Orchard Park, NY
- Start Time: 1PM ET/10AM PT
- Attendance: 77,635
- Weather: 68 °F (20 °C), sunny
- TV: CBS
- Announcers: Greg Gumbel and Phil Simms

=== Week 8 ===
| Team | 1 | 2 | 3 | 4 | Total |
|---|---|---|---|---|---|
| • Bills | 10 | 7 | 10 | 3 | 30 |
| Panthers | 0 | 7 | 0 | 7 | 14 |

- Date: October 25
- Location: Ericsson Stadium, Charlotte, North Carolina
- Game start: 8:20 p.m.
- Game weather: 55 °F (13 °C), wind 2 mph (3.2 km/h)
- Referee: Gerry Austin
- TV announcers (ESPN): Mike Patrick, Joe Theismann, Paul Maguire and Solomon Wilcots

Scoring summary
| 1 | BUF | Eric Moulds 20 yard pass from Doug Flutie (Steve Christie kick) | Bills 7–0 |
| 1 | BUF | Steve Christie 42 yard field goal | Bills 10–0 |
| 2 | CAR | William Floyd 1 yard run (John Kasay kick) | Bills 10–7 |
| 2 | BUF | Eric Moulds 82 yard pass from Doug Flutie (Steve Christie kick) | Bills 17–7 |
| 3 | BUF | Steve Christie 47 yard field goal | Bills 20–7 |
| 3 | BUF | Thurman Thomas 17 yard run (Steve Christie kick) | Bills 27–7 |
| 4 | BUF | Steve Christie 44 yard field goal | Bills 30–7 |
| 4 | CAR | Mark Carrier 8 yard pass from Steve Beuerlein (John Kasay kick) | Bills 30–14 |

=== Week 10 ===
| Team | 1 | 2 | 3 | 4 | Total |
|---|---|---|---|---|---|
| Bills | 3 | 6 | 3 | 0 | 12 |
| • Jets | 7 | 6 | 7 | 14 | 34 |

- Date: Nov 8, 1998
- Location: Giants Stadium, East Rutherford, New Jersey
- Game start: 4:15 PM EST
- Game attendance: 75,403
- Game weather: 38 °F (3 °C) • 11 miles per hour (18 km/h; 9.6 kn)
- Referee: Bernie Kukar
- TV announcers (NFL on CBS): Greg Gumbel and Phil Simms

=== Week 14 ===
First meeting of the two teams in Cincinnati since the 1988 AFC Championship Game.

Starting QBs: Buffalo: Doug Flutie

Cincinnati: Neil O'Donnell

Vegas Line: Buffalo Bills -4.5

Over/Under: 43.0 (over)

On the first play from scrimmage, Eric Moulds became the 20th Player in Bills History With 50+ Receptions In A Season, as he caught a 55 yard reception from Doug Flutie.

Buffalo Bills (7-5) at Cincinnati Bengals (2-10)

| Team | 1 | 2 | 3 | 4 | Total |
|---|---|---|---|---|---|
| • Bills | 10 | 10 | 6 | 7 | 33 |
| Bengals | 0 | 13 | 0 | 7 | 20 |

- Date: Sunday Dec 6, 1998
- Location: Cinergy Field Cincinnati
- Game start: 1:00 p.m. EST
- Game attendance: 54,359
- Game weather: 66 °F (18.9 °C) • 14 miles per hour (23 km/h; 12 kn)
- Referee: Ron Blum
- TV announcers (NFL on CBS): Gus Johnson (sportscaster) and Steve Tasker

Scoring summary

| Quarter | Time | Drive | | | Team | Scoring information | Score | |
| Quarter | Time | Plays | Yards | TOP | Team | Scoring information | BUF | CIN |
|---|---|---|---|---|---|---|---|---|
| 1 | 12:44 | 4 | 66 | 2:16 | Bills | Antowain Smith 1-yard touchdown run, Steve Christie kick good | 7 | 0 |
| 1 | 6:12 | 9 | 69 | 1:52 | Bills | 20-yard field goal by Steve Christie | 10 | 0 |
| 2 | 14:10 | 1 | 3 | 0:06 | Bengals | Darnay Scott 8-yard touchdown reception from Neil O'Donnell, kick no good (snap fumbled) | 10 | 6 |
| 2 | 9:13 | 5 | 57 | 2:26 | Bengals | Carl Pickens 3-yard touchdown reception from Neil O'Donnell, Doug Pelfrey kick good | 10 | 13 |
| 2 | 1:41 | 1 | 65 | 0:13 | Bills | Eric Moulds 70-yard touchdown reception from Doug Flutie, Steve Christie kick good | 17 | 13 |
| 2 | 0:04 | 6 | 22 | 0:45 | Bills | 52-yard field goal by Steve Christie | 20 | 13 |
| 3 | 10:38 | 8 | 38 | 3:13 | Buffalo | 46-yard field goal by Steve Christie | 23 | 13 |
| 3 | 3:22 | 10 | 39 | 4:25 | Bills | 34-yard field goal by Steve Christie | 26 | 13 |
| 4 | 12:12 | 4 | 59 | 2:00 | Bills | Eric Moulds 30-yard touchdown reception from Doug Flutie, Steve Christie kick good | 33 | 13 |
| 4 | 1:42 | 6 | 24 | 1:41 | Bengals | Corey Dillon 3-yard touchdown run, Doug Pelfrey kick good | 33 | 20 |
| "TOP" = time of possession. For other American football terms, see Glossary of American football. | | | | | | | 33 | 20 |

| Team | Category | Player | Statistics |
|---|---|---|---|
| Bills | Passing | Doug Flutie | 18/30, 319 yards, 2 TD, 3 INT |
| Bills | Rushing | Antowain Smith | 18 carries, 77 yards, 1 TD |
| Bills | Receiving | Eric Moulds | 9 receptions, 196 yards, 2 TD |
| Bengals | Passing | Neil O'Donnell | 19/31, 168 yards, 2 TD, 1 INT |
| Bengals | Rushing | Corey Dillon | 11 carries, 43 yards, 1 TD |
| Bengals | Receiving | Carl Pickens | 8 receptions, 97 yards, 1 TD |

| Statistics | Bills | Bengals |
|---|---|---|
| First downs | 21 | 15 |
| Plays–yards | 64-448 | 53-234 |
| Rushes–yards | 34-139 | 17-58 |
| Passing yards | 309 | 176 |
| Passing: comp–att–int | 18-30-3 | 22-36-1 |
| Turnovers | | |
| Time of possession | 34:23 | 25:37 |

=== Week 15 ===
Wade Wilson gets his 2nd start at QB since 1993 by head coach John Gruden. Buffalo clinches playoff berth with the win. Wade Phillips also gets his first head coaching win vs the Raiders.

Raiders (7-6) at Bills (8-5)

| Team | 1 | 2 | 3 | 4 | Total |
|---|---|---|---|---|---|
| Raiders | 0 | 7 | 7 | 7 | 21 |
| • Bills | 3 | 17 | 17 | 7 | 44 |

- Date: December 13
- Location: Rich Stadium, Orchard Park, New York
- Game start: 1:00 p.m. EST
- Game attendance: 62,002
- Game weather: 38 °F (3 °C) • 11 miles per hour (18 km/h; 9.6 kn)
- Referee: Bill Carollo
- TV announcers (NFL on CBS): Ian Eagle and Mark May

== Standings ==
AFC East
| | W | L | T | PCT | PF | PA | STK |
|---|---|---|---|---|---|---|---|
| ^{(2)} New York Jets | 12 | 4 | 0 | .750 | 416 | 266 | W6 |
| ^{(4)} Miami Dolphins | 10 | 6 | 0 | .625 | 321 | 265 | L1 |
| ^{(5)} Buffalo Bills | 10 | 6 | 0 | .625 | 400 | 333 | W1 |
| ^{(6)} New England Patriots | 9 | 7 | 0 | .563 | 337 | 329 | L1 |
| Indianapolis Colts | 3 | 13 | 0 | .188 | 310 | 444 | L2 |

== Playoffs ==
=== AFC: Miami Dolphins 24, Buffalo Bills 17 ===
| Quarter | 1 | 2 | 3 | 4 | Total |
|---|---|---|---|---|---|
| Bills | 0 | 7 | 7 | 3 | 17 |
| Dolphins | 3 | 3 | 8 | 10 | 24 |

at Pro Player Stadium, Miami, Florida

- Game time: 12:30 p.m. EST
- Game weather: 80 °F (27 °C), partly cloudy
- Game attendance: 72,698
- Referee: Mike Carey
- TV announcers (ABC): Al Michaels (play-by-play), Dan Dierdorf, Boomer Esiason (color commentators), and Lesley Visser (sideline reporter)

== Awards and honors ==
- Doug Flutie, AFC Pro Bowl Selection
- Doug Flutie, NFL Comeback Player of the Year
