= 1996–97 NFL playoffs =

American football tournament

- Dates: December 28, 1996–January 26, 1997
- Season: 1996
- Teams: 12
- Games played: 11
- Super Bowl XXXI site: Louisiana Superdome; New Orleans, Louisiana
- Defending champions: Dallas Cowboys
- Champion: Green Bay Packers (12th title)
- Runner-up: New England Patriots
- Conference runners-up: Carolina Panthers; Jacksonville Jaguars
NFL playoffs
← 1995–96	1997–98 →

The National Football League playoffs for the 1996 season began on December 28, 1996. The postseason tournament concluded with the Green Bay Packers defeating the New England Patriots in Super Bowl XXXI, 35–21, on January 26, 1997, at the Louisiana Superdome in New Orleans, Louisiana.

The Carolina Panthers and Jacksonville Jaguars, each in just their second year of existence, not only qualified for the playoffs for the first time, but they also both advanced to their respective conference championship games.

== Participants ==
Within each conference, the three division winners and the three non-division winners with the best overall regular season records qualified for the playoffs. The three division winners were seeded 1–3 based on the overall won-lost-tied record, and the three wild card teams were seeded 4–6. The NFL did not use a fixed bracket playoff system, and there were no restrictions regarding teams from the same division matching up in any round. In the first round, dubbed the wild-card playoffs or wild-card weekend, the third-seeded division winner hosted the sixth seed wild card, and the fourth seed hosted the fifth. The 1 and 2 seeds from each conference received a first-round bye. In the second round, the divisional playoffs, the number 1 seed hosted the worst-remaining seed from the first round (seed 4, 5, or 6), while the number 2 seed played the other team (seed 3, 4, or 5). The two winning teams from each conference's divisional playoff games then meet in the respective AFC and NFC Conference Championship games, hosted by the higher seed. Although the Super Bowl, the championship round of the playoffs, was played at a neutral site, the designated home team was based on an annual rotation by conference.

Playoff seeds
Seed	AFC	NFC
1	Denver Broncos (West winner)	Green Bay Packers (Central winner)
2	New England Patriots (East winner)	Carolina Panthers (West winner)
3	Pittsburgh Steelers (Central winner)	Dallas Cowboys (East winner)
4	Buffalo Bills (wild card)	San Francisco 49ers (wild card)
5	Jacksonville Jaguars (wild card)	Philadelphia Eagles (wild card)
6	Indianapolis Colts (wild card)	Minnesota Vikings (wild card)

== Bracket ==
Dec 28 – Rich Stadium	Jan 4 – Mile High Stadium
5	Jacksonville	30
5	Jacksonville	30
4	Buffalo	27	Jan 12 – Foxboro Stadium
1	Denver	27
AFC
Dec 29 – Three Rivers Stadium	5	Jacksonville	6
Jan 5 – Foxboro Stadium
2	New England	20
6	Indianapolis	14	AFC Championship
3	Pittsburgh	3
3	Pittsburgh	42	Jan 26 – Louisiana Superdome
2	New England	28
Wild-card round
Divisional round
Dec 28 – Texas Stadium	A2	New England	21
Jan 5 – Ericsson Stadium
N1	Green Bay	35
6	Minnesota	15	Super Bowl XXXI
3	Dallas	17
3	Dallas	40	Jan 12 – Lambeau Field
2	Carolina	26
NFC
Dec 29 – 3Com Park	2	Carolina	13
Jan 4 – Lambeau Field
1	Green Bay	30
5	Philadelphia	0	NFC Championship
4	San Francisco	14
4	San Francisco	14
1	Green Bay	35

== Schedule ==
In the United States, ABC broadcast the first two Wild Card playoff games, then NBC broadcast the rest of the AFC playoff games. Fox televised the rest of the NFC games and Super Bowl XXXI (their first ever Super Bowl broadcast since becoming the NFC network in 1994).

The 1996-97 playoffs marked the first time that ABC employed ESPN’s NFL announce team for its Wild Card Weekend coverage; Mike Patrick replaced Brent Musburger on play-by-play with Joe Theismann replacing Dick Vermeil as analyst. Musburger and Vermeil, who at the time comprised ABC’s #2 college football broadcast team, had called one of the two Wild Card matchups every year since the playoffs expanded in 1990.

Round	Away team	Score	Home team	Date	Kickoff (ET / UTC−5)	TV
Wild-card round	Jacksonville Jaguars	30–27	Buffalo Bills	December 28, 1996	12:30 p.m.	ABC
Wild-card round	Minnesota Vikings	15–40	Dallas Cowboys	December 28, 1996	4:00 p.m.	ABC
Wild-card round	Indianapolis Colts	14–42	Pittsburgh Steelers	December 29, 1996	12:30 p.m.	NBC
Wild-card round	Philadelphia Eagles	0–14	San Francisco 49ers	December 29, 1996	4:00 p.m.	Fox
Divisional round	San Francisco 49ers	14–35	Green Bay Packers	January 4, 1997	12:30 p.m.	Fox
Divisional round	Jacksonville Jaguars	30–27	Denver Broncos	January 4, 1997	4:00 p.m.	NBC
Divisional round	Pittsburgh Steelers	3–28	New England Patriots	January 5, 1997	12:30 p.m.	NBC
Divisional round	Dallas Cowboys	17–26	Carolina Panthers	January 5, 1997	4:00 p.m.	Fox
Conference championships	Carolina Panthers	13–30	Green Bay Packers	January 12, 1997	12:30 p.m.	Fox
Conference championships	Jacksonville Jaguars	6–20	New England Patriots	January 12, 1997	4:00 p.m.	NBC
Super Bowl XXXI Louisiana Superdome New Orleans, Louisiana	New England Patriots	21–35	Green Bay Packers	January 26, 1997	6:15 p.m.	Fox

== Wild-card round ==
=== Saturday, December 28, 1996 ===
==== AFC: Jacksonville Jaguars 30, Buffalo Bills 27 ====
Jacksonville Jaguars vs. Buffalo Bills – Game summary

Quarter	1	2	3	4	Total
Jaguars	10	7	3	10	30
Bills	14	3	3	7	27

at Rich Stadium, Orchard Park, New York

- Game time: 12:30 p.m. EST
- Game weather: 48 °F (9 °C), cloudy
- Game attendance: 70,213
- Referee: Gary Lane
- TV announcers (ABC): Mike Patrick (play-by-play) and Joe Theismann (color commentator)

Game information

First quarter

- BUF – Thurman Thomas 7-yard pass from Jim Kelly (Steve Christie kick). Bills 7–0.
- JAX – Clyde Simmons 20-yard interception return (Mike Hollis kick). Tied 7–7.
- BUF – Thurman Thomas 2-yard run (Steve Christie kick). Bills 14–7.
- JAX – Mike Hollis 27-yard field goal. Bills 14–10.

Second quarter

- JAX – Natrone Means 30-yard run (Mike Hollis kick). Jaguars 17–14.
- BUF – Steve Christie 33-yard field goal. Tied 17–17.

Third quarter

- BUF – Steve Christie 47-yard field goal. Bills 20–17.
- JAX – Mike Hollis 24-yard field goal. Tied 20–20.

Fourth quarter

- BUF – Jeff Burris 38-yard interception return (Steve Christie kick). Bills 27–20.
- JAX – Jimmy Smith 2-yard pass from Mark Brunell (Mike Hollis kick). Tied 27–27.
- JAX – Mike Hollis 45-yard field goal. Jaguars 30–27.

Top passers

- JAX – Mark Brunell – 18/33, 239 yards, TD, 2 INT
- BUF – Jim Kelly – 21/32, 239 yards, TD, INT

Top rushers

- JAX – Natrone Means – 31 rushes, 175 yards, TD
- BUF – Thurman Thomas – 14 rushes, 50 yards, TD

Top receivers

- JAX – Keenan McCardell – 4 receptions, 76 yards
- BUF – Quinn Early – 9 receptions, 122 yards

The second-year Jaguars forced four turnovers, racked up three sacks, and outgained Buffalo in total yards 409–308 to earn their first playoff win. After trading points back and forth all day, almost drive for drive, Jaguars safety Chris Hudson would make a decisive hit on Bills quarterback Jim Kelly, knocking him out of the game and forcing a fumble that his team would convert into the game-winning score.

Jacksonville was forced to punt on their opening drive, and Russell Copeland returned the ball 16 yards to the Jags' 43-yard line, setting up Kelly's 7-yard touchdown pass to running back Thurman Thomas. But later in the quarter, Jacksonville defensive end Clyde Simmons intercepted a shovel pass intended for Thomas and returned it 20 yards for a touchdown to tie the game. Buffalo stormed right back with a 10-play, 68-yard drive that ended with Thomas' 2-yard touchdown run, making the score 14–7. However, Jacksonville running back Natrone Means's 62-yard carry on their next drive moved the ball to the Bills' 5-yard line. The drive stalled there, but Mike Hollis kicked a 27-yard field goal to make the score 14–10 at the end of the first quarter.

The Bills drove to the Jags' 2-yard line on their first drive of the second quarter, but came up empty when Kelly was stuffed for no gain by Jeff Lageman while trying to convert a fourth and 1 on a quarterback sneak. Jacksonville then stormed to their first lead of the day with quarterback Mark Brunell completing a 47-yard pass to tight end Pete Mitchell before Means took off for a 30-yard touchdown burst, giving them a 17–14 advantage. However, Eric Moulds returned the ensuing kickoff 57 yards to the Jags' 42-yard line, setting up a 33-yard Steve Christie field goal to tie the game at 17. Jacksonville responded with a drive to the Buffalo 36, but on the last play of the half, Brunell was intercepted by Thomas Smith.

Moulds returned the second-half kickoff 26 yards to the Bills' 38-yard line, where the Bills went on to retake the lead with Christie's 47-yard field goal. But after a few punts, Jacksonville managed to tie it again with an 11-play, 62-yard drive that included a 27-yard catch by receiver Keenan McCardell and ended with a 24-yard field goal by Hollis.

On the second play of the fourth quarter, Jeff Burris picked off Brunell's pass and returned it 38 yards for a touchdown to give his team a 27–20 lead. Jacksonville countered right back, moving the ball 65 yards in 10 plays. McCardell caught two passes for 39 yards on the drive, while Means kept it going with a 2-yard run on fourth and 1. Brunell finished the drive with a 2-yard toss to Jimmy Smith that tied the game at 27. On Buffalo's next drive, Hudson made a devastating hit on Kelly, knocking him out of the game and forcing a fumble that was recovered by cornerback Aaron Beasley on the Jags' 42-yard line. Brunell then completed a pair of passes to Smith and McCardell for gains of 14 and 11 yards to set up Hollis's 45-yard field goal, putting them back in front for good at 30–27. The Bills offense, now led by Todd Collins, were unable to move the ball on any of their remaining drives, and during the game's final seconds, Tony Brackens forced a fumble while sacking Collins that linebacker Eddie Robinson recovered to seal the win.

Means finished the game with 175 rushing yards. Simmons finished with two sacks and an interception returned for a touchdown. Bills receiver Quinn Early caught nine passes for 122 yards. Moulds returned five kickoffs for 142 yards. This was the final game of Kelly's Hall of Fame career, and the final playoff game for Bills Hall of Fame coach Marv Levy as well.

This was the first postseason meeting between the Jaguars and the Bills.

A fictionalized version of the game was played during the final season of the ABC series Coach, with the Orlando Breakers as the Jaguars' stand-in that also made the playoffs in their second year of existence; however, the Breakers lost to the Bills in a 63-0 blowout, which ended their season.

==== NFC: Dallas Cowboys 40, Minnesota Vikings 15 ====
Minnesota Vikings vs. Dallas Cowboys – Game summary

Quarter	1	2	3	4	Total
Vikings	0	0	7	8	15
Cowboys	7	23	7	3	40

at Texas Stadium, Irving, Texas

- Game time: 4:00 p.m. EST/3:00 p.m. CST
- Game weather: 69 °F (21 °C), clear
- Game attendance: 64,682
- Referee: Gerald Austin
- TV announcers (ABC): Al Michaels (play-by-play), Frank Gifford, and Dan Dierdorf (color commentators)

Game information

First quarter

- DAL – Troy Aikman 2-yard run (Chris Boniol kick). Cowboys 7–0.

Second quarter

- DAL – Chris Boniol 28-yard field goal. Cowboys 10–0.
- DAL – Emmitt Smith 37-yard run (Chris Boniol kick). Cowboys 17–0.
- DAL – George Teague 29-yard interception return (Chris Boniol kick). Cowboys 24–0.
- DAL – Chris Boniol 31-yard field goal. Cowboys 27–0.

Third quarter

- DAL – Chris Boniol 22-yard field goal. Cowboys 30–0.
- MIN – Cris Carter 30-yard pass from Brad Johnson (Scott Sisson kick). Cowboys 30–7.
- DAL – Emmitt Smith 1-yard run (Chris Boniol kick). Cowboys 37–7.

Fourth quarter

- DAL – Chris Boniol 25-yard field goal. Cowboys 40–7.
- MIN – Brad Johnson 5-yard run (Cris Carter pass from Brad Johnson). Cowboys 40–15.

Top passers

- MIN – Brad Johnson – 15/27, 208 yards, TD, 2 INT
- DAL – Troy Aikman – 19/29, 178 yards, INT

Top rushers

- MIN – Amp Lee – 7 rushes, 26 yards
- DAL – Emmitt Smith – 17 rushes, 116 yards, 2 TD

Top receivers

- MIN – Qadry Ismail – 3 receptions, 78 yards
- DAL – Michael Irvin – 8 receptions, 103 yards

Dallas outgained the Vikings in total yards 438–268, plays 78–44, and time of possession 42:03–17:57. They also forced six turnovers and scored on five first half possessions to win the game.

Dallas scored first on a 14-play, 88-yard drive in which Troy Aikman completed four passes to Michael Irvin for 65 yards and finished the drive with a 2-yard touchdown run. Perhaps the key point of the game occurred on the next series when Minnesota running back Amp Lee caught a short pass from quarterback Brad Johnson and appeared to be on his way for a 43-yard touchdown. But Cowboys safety George Teague caught up with Lee at the 1-yard line and poked the ball out of his hands, knocking it out of the end zone for a touchback. Dallas then drove 70 yards, including a 22-yard carry by Herschel Walker, to go up 10–0 on Chris Boniol's 28-yard field goal. Five plays after the ensuing kickoff, Teague stripped the ball from Vikings running back Leroy Hoard. Cornerback Deion Sanders recovered the fumble and lateraled it to Shante Carver, who was tackled on the Minnesota 37, and Emmitt Smith took off for a 37-yard touchdown run on the next play. Then during Minnesota's next possession, Teague intercepted a pass from Johnson and returned it 29 yards for a touchdown, giving the Cowboys a 24–0 lead with 8:36 left in the second quarter.

The Dallas dominance would continue as Sanders returned an interception 22 yards to the Vikings 29 to set up a 31-yard Boniol field goal. Even Orlando Thomas's interception of an Aikman pass ended up going against the Vikings as Thomas lost the ball while being tackled by Walker and tight end Eric Bjornson got it back for the Cowboys. This led to Boniol's 22-yard field goal, giving Dallas a 30–0 lead at the end of the half.

In the second half, Minnesota drove 47 yards and scored on a 30-yard pass from Johnson to Cris Carter. But this was answered by Dallas, who subsequently moved the ball 80 yards in 16 plays to go up 37–7 on Smith's 1-yard touchdown run. In the fourth quarter, Dallas linebacker Broderick Thomas forced a turnover by sacking Johnson on fourth down, giving Dallas the ball on the Vikings 39, which led to another Boniol field goal. On the ensuing drive, Johnson's 50-yard completion to Qadry Ismail set up the final score of the game on Johnson's 2-yard touchdown run.

Smith rushed for 117 yards and two touchdowns, while also catching four passes for 26 yards. Irvin caught eight passes for 103 yards. Teague had five tackles, two forced fumbles, and an interception return for a touchdown. This was the last time the Cowboys won a playoff game until January 9, 2010, when they beat the Philadelphia Eagles in the 2009 NFC Wild Card playoffs 34–14, and their last playoff win at Texas Stadium. Meanwhile, the Vikings fell to 0–4 in the playoffs under coach Dennis Green.

This was the fifth postseason meeting between the Vikings and Cowboys. Dallas won three of the prior four meetings.

Previous playoff games
Dallas leads 3–1 in all-time playoff games

1971

Dallas Cowboys 20 @ Minnesota Vikings 12

1971 NFC Divisional playoffs

1973

Minnesota Vikings 27 @ Dallas Cowboys 10

1973 NFC Championship Game

1975

Dallas Cowboys 17 @ Minnesota Vikings 14

1975 NFC Divisional playoffs

1977

Minnesota Vikings 6 @ Dallas Cowboys 23

1977 NFC Championship Game

=== Sunday, December 29, 1996 ===
==== AFC: Pittsburgh Steelers 42, Indianapolis Colts 14 ====
Indianapolis Colts vs. Pittsburgh Steelers – Game summary

Quarter	1	2	3	4	Total
Colts	0	14	0	0	14
Steelers	10	3	8	21	42

at Three Rivers Stadium, Pittsburgh, Pennsylvania

- Game time: 12:30 p.m. EST
- Game weather: 60 °F (16 °C), partly cloudy
- Game attendance: 58,078
- Referee: Ed Hochuli
- TV announcers (NBC): Dick Enberg (play-by-play), Phil Simms, and Paul Maguire (color commentators)

Game information

First quarter

- PIT – Norm Johnson 29-yard field goal. Steelers 3–0.
- PIT – Kordell Stewart 1-yard run (Norm Johnson kick). Steelers 10–0.

Second quarter

- PIT – Norm Johnson 50-yard field goal. Steelers 13–0.
- IND – Eugene Daniel 59-yard interception return (Cary Blanchard kick). Steelers 13–7.
- IND – Aaron Bailey 9-yard pass from Jim Harbaugh (Cary Blanchard kick). Colts 14–13.

Third quarter

- PIT – Jerome Bettis 1-yard run (John Farquhar pass from Kordell Stewart). Steelers 21–14.

Fourth quarter

- PIT – Jerome Bettis 1-yard run (Norm Johnson kick). Steelers 28–14.
- PIT – Jon Witman 31-yard run (Norm Johnson kick). Steelers 35–14.
- PIT – Kordell Stewart 3-yard run (Norm Johnson kick). Steelers 42–14.

Top passers

- IND – Jim Harbaugh – 12/32, 134 yards, TD, INT
- PIT – Mike Tomczak – 13/21, 176 yards, 2 INT

Top rushers

- IND – Marshall Faulk – 9 rushes, 25 yards
- PIT – Jerome Bettis – 25 rushes, 102 yards, 2 TD

Top receivers

- IND – Marvin Harrison – 3 receptions, 71 yards
- PIT – Charles Johnson – 5 receptions, 109 yards

The Steelers blew a 13-point lead in the first half but scored 29 unanswered points in the second half. Meanwhile, Pittsburgh held the Colts to 146 total yards of offense, while gaining 407 yards for themselves (236 on the ground).

Pittsburgh drove 51 yards in eight plays, including a 30-yard reception by receiver Charles Johnson, to score on Norm Johnson's 29-yard field goal on their first drive. After the Colts' next drive, Steelers receiver Jahine Arnold returned their punt 36 yards to the Colts' 31-yard line. One play later, Mike Tomczak completed a 20-yard pass to Charles Johnson at the 8. Backup quarterback Kordell Stewart, who was routinely used by the team in short-yardage situations, eventually finished the drive with a 1-yard touchdown run, giving the Steelers a 10–0 lead with 4:55 left in the first quarter. Following another Colts punt, Pittsburgh increased their lead to 13–0 with Norm Johnson's 50-yard field goal 10 seconds into the second quarter.

Pittsburgh seemed to be taking control of the game, but with 4:35 left in the half, Tomczak threw a short pass intended for Ernie Mills that was too far behind the receiver. Cornerback Eugene Daniel intercepted the ball and returned it 59 yards for a touchdown. On the Steelers next possession, Tomczak threw an interception to safety Ray McElroy on the Colts 40-yard line. On the next play, Jim Harbaugh completed a 48-yard pass to Marvin Harrison at the Steelers 12, and he eventually converted a third and 7 situation with a 9-yard touchdown pass to receiver Aaron Bailey, giving the team a 14–13 lead with 31 seconds left before halftime.

However, the Steelers dominated the rest of the game. They started out the second half with a 16-play, 91-yard possession that ate 9:30 off the clock. Tomczak completed 5/5 passes for 37 yards on the drive, while Jerome Bettis caught one of them and rushed for 42 yards on eight carries, the last a 1-yard touchdown run. Then Stewart completed a 2-point conversion pass to tight end John Farquhar, giving the team a 21–14 lead. Harbaugh was intercepted by Levon Kirkland on the next drive, and after a Steelers punt, running back Marshall Faulk fumbled a pitch from him which safety Carnell Lake recovered on the Indy 18-yard line. Five plays later, Bettis scored another 1-yard touchdown run to give the Steelers a 28–14 lead less than a minute into the fourth quarter.

Stewart ended up as the Steelers' QB for the rest of the game. He finished with just one pass attempt, but his 24-yard run on a quarterback draw set up running back Jon Witman's 31-yard touchdown play. Stewart added a 3-yard touchdown run with 3:10 left in the game, making the final score 42–14. It was the second straight year the Steelers eliminated the Colts from the playoffs.

Bettis rushed for 102 yards and two touchdowns (his 11th 100-yard game of the year), while also catching a pass for four yards. Johnson caught five passes for 109 yards. Neither starting quarterback had a big day. Tomczak completed 13 of 21 passes for 176 yards, with two interceptions and no touchdowns. Harbaugh completed 12 of 32 passes for 134 yards and a touchdown with one pick. He was also sacked four times, three by Chad Brown.

This was the fourth postseason meeting between the Colts and Steelers. Pittsburgh had won all three prior meetings.

Previous playoff games
Pittsburgh leads 3–0 in all-time playoff games

1975

Baltimore Colts 10 @ Pittsburgh Steelers 28

1975 AFC Divisional playoffs

1976

Pittsburgh Steelers 40 @ Baltimore Colts 14

1976 AFC Divisional playoffs

1995

Indianapolis Colts 16 @ Pittsburgh Steelers 20

1995 AFC Championship Game

==== NFC: San Francisco 49ers 14, Philadelphia Eagles 0 ====
Philadelphia Eagles vs. San Francisco 49ers – Game summary

Quarter	1	2	3	4	Total
Eagles	0	0	0	0	0
49ers	0	7	7	0	14

at 3Com Park at Candlestick Point, San Francisco, California

- Game time: 4:00 p.m. EST/1:00 p.m. PST
- Game weather: 61 °F (16 °C), rain
- Game attendance: 56,460
- Referee: Walt Coleman
- TV announcers (Fox): Pat Summerall (play-by-play) and John Madden (color commentator)

Game information

First quarter

- No scoring plays

Second quarter

- SF – Steve Young 9-yard run (Jeff Wilkins kick). 49ers 7–0.

Third quarter

- SF – Jerry Rice 3-yard pass from Steve Young (Jeff Wilkins kick). 49ers 14–0.

Fourth quarter

- No scoring plays

Top passers

- PHI – Ty Detmer – 14/21, 148 yards, 2 INT
- SF – Steve Young – 14/21, 161 yards, TD

Top rushers

- PHI – Ricky Watters – 20 rushes, 57 yards
- SF – Steve Young – 11 rushes, 65 yards, TD

Top receivers

- PHI – Irving Fryar – 5 receptions, 62 yards
- SF – Jerry Rice – 4 receptions, 50 yards, TD

Although they gained more yards than the 49ers, the Eagles were shut out in a rain-soaked, muddy game with 62 miles per hour winds. San Francisco won 14–0 in what coach George Seifert called "the swampy tundra of Candlestick." (A reference to John Facenda's famous description of Lambeau Field as "the frozen tundra") Despite the poor weather, San Francisco finished the game without losing any turnovers.

Kicker Gary Anderson missed a 40-yard field goal attempt on Philadelphia's first possession. In the second quarter, San Francisco quarterback Steve Young completed 6/7 passes for 60 yards on a 74-yard drive and finished it off with a 9-yard touchdown run. The Eagles then reached the San Francisco 8-yard line, but quarterback Ty Detmer threw an interception to Marquez Pope. The 49ers were forced to punt on their next drive, and Philadelphia advanced to the San Francisco 5-yard line. However, 49ers defensive end Roy Barker intercepted Detmer with 43 seconds left in the half, and the Eagles would never seriously threaten again.

Detmer was knocked out of the game in the third quarter with a hamstring injury, and his replacement Mark Rypien completed only five of 12 passes for 77 yards, including an interception to Tim McDonald on the last play of the game. Meanwhile, a one handed 36-yard reception by 49ers receiver Jerry Rice set up the final score of the game with his 3-yard touchdown catch from Young, finishing off a 61-yard drive in the third quarter. This was the lowest scoring wild-card playoff game in NFL history.

Young finished the game 14/21 for 161 yards and a touchdown, while also rushing for 65 yards and another score. 49ers defensive tackle Bryant Young had two sacks.

This would be the last time the Eagles lost in the Wild Card game until 2009.

The two teams met again in the 2022 NFC Championship game.

This was the first postseason meeting between the Eagles and 49ers.

== Divisional round ==
=== Saturday, January 4, 1997 ===
==== NFC: Green Bay Packers 35, San Francisco 49ers 14 ====
San Francisco 49ers vs. Green Bay Packers – Game summary

Quarter	1	2	3	4	Total
49ers	0	7	7	0	14
Packers	14	7	7	7	35

at Lambeau Field, Green Bay, Wisconsin

- Game time: 12:30 p.m. EST/11:30 a.m. CST
- Game weather: 35 °F (2 °C), mix of rain and snow
- Game attendance: 60,787
- Referee: Dick Hantak
- TV announcers (Fox): Dick Stockton (play-by-play) and Matt Millen (color commentator)

Game information

First quarter

- GB – Desmond Howard 71-yard punt return (Chris Jacke kick). Packers 7–0.
- GB – Andre Rison 4-yard pass from Brett Favre (Chris Jacke kick). Packers 14–0.

Second quarter

- GB – Edgar Bennett 2-yard run (Chris Jacke kick). Packers 21–0.
- SF – Terry Kirby 8-yard pass from Elvis Grbac (Jeff Wilkins kick). Packers 21–7.

Third quarter

- SF – Elvis Grbac 2-yard run (Jeff Wilkins kick). Packers 21–14.
- GB – Antonio Freeman offensive fumble recovery in end zone (Chris Jacke kick). Packers 28–14.

Fourth quarter

- GB – Edgar Bennett 11-yard run (Chris Jacke kick). Packers 35–14.

Top passers

- SF – Elvis Grbac – 19/36, 125 yards, TD, 3 INT
- GB – Brett Favre – 11/15, 79 yards, TD

Top rushers

- SF – Elvis Grbac – 4 rushes, 32 yards, TD
- GB – Edgar Bennett – 17 rushes, 80 yards, 2 TD

Top receivers

- SF – Jerry Rice – 5 receptions, 36 yards
- GB – Antonio Freeman – 2 receptions, 26 yards

The Packers defense forced five turnovers en route to victory, while Desmond Howard's key punt returns enabled the Packers to jump to a 14–0 lead after only three offensive plays. On his first punt return, Howard ran 71 yards for a touchdown. At the end of the next series, he returned punt 46 yards to the 49ers 7-yard line to set up quarterback Brett Favre's 4-yard touchdown to wide receiver Andre Rison.

Early in the second quarter, cornerback Craig Newsome's interception set up the Packers third touchdown of the day. Newsome fumbled the ball while being hit during the interception return, but his teammate Sean Jones recovered the ball on the 49ers 15-yard line. Three plays later, Edgar Bennett's touchdown run increased the Packers lead to 21–0.

Two Green Bay turnovers enabled San Francisco to mount a comeback attempt. First, a 49ers punt bounced into Packers safety Chris Hayes and was recovered by San Francisco's Curtis Buckley at the Green Bay 26-yard line. Six plays later, backup quarterback Elvis Grbac (who had replaced injured starter Steve Young) threw a 6-yard touchdown pass to running back Terry Kirby with 24 seconds left in the half. Then in a odd error, Howard did not come out of the locker room in time for the second-half kickoff, and no one on the team noticed. With only 10 Green Bay players on the field to receive the second-half kickoff and no one in the returner position, the kickoff bounced into the ground and Iheanyi Uwaezuoke recovered it for San Francisco on the Green Bay 4-yard line. On the next play, Grbac's 4-yard touchdown run cut the score to 21–14.

However, the Packers marched 72 yards for another touchdown, in which a fumble by Bennett was recovered in the end zone by wide receiver Antonio Freeman. Later on, with 5:31 left in the game, Kirby lost a fumble while being tackled by Green Bay defensive back Mike Prior, and Hayes recovered the ball on the 49ers' 32-yard line. Six plays later, Bennett scored his second touchdown of the game on an 11-yard run to close out the scoring.

Because the weather dipped in and out of freezing, causing both rain and snow, the field got extremely muddy as the game went on. The Green Bay Press-Gazette called the game the "Mud Bowl." Neither team had much success moving the ball on offense due to the field conditions. The Packers, who averaged over 345 yards per game during the season, gained just 210 yards, while the 49ers managed only 196. The longest completion of the day was an 18-yard reception by Freeman. Bennett was one of the top players of the day with 80 rushing yards and two touchdowns, along with two receptions for 14 yards.

This was the second postseason meeting between the 49ers and Packers with the first happening the previous year, which Green Bay won.

Previous playoff games
Green Bay leads 1–0 in all-time playoff games

1995

Green Bay Packers 27 @ San Francisco 49ers 17

1995 NFC Divisional playoffs

==== AFC: Jacksonville Jaguars 30, Denver Broncos 27 ====
Jacksonville Jaguars vs. Denver Broncos – Game summary

Quarter	1	2	3	4	Total
Jaguars	0	13	7	10	30
Broncos	12	0	0	15	27

at Mile High Stadium, Denver, Colorado

- Game time: 4:00 p.m. EST/2:00 p.m. MST
- Game weather: 43 °F (6 °C), clear
- Game attendance: 75,678
- Referee: Red Cashion
- TV announcers (NBC): Dick Enberg (play-by-play), Phil Simms, and Paul Maguire (color commentators)

Game information

First quarter

- DEN – Vaughn Hebron 1-yard run (kick blocked). Broncos 6–0.
- DEN – Shannon Sharpe 18-yard pass from John Elway (pass failed). Broncos 12–0.

Second quarter

- JAX – Mike Hollis 46-yard field goal. Broncos 12–3.
- JAX – Natrone Means 8-yard run (Mike Hollis kick). Broncos 12–10.

Third quarter

- JAX – Mike Hollis 42-yard field goal. Jaguars 13–12.
- JAX – Keenan McCardell 31-yard pass from Mark Brunell (Mike Hollis kick). Jaguars 20–12.

Fourth quarter

- JAX – Mike Hollis 22-yard field goal. Jaguars 23–12.
- DEN – Terrell Davis 2-yard run (Terrell Davis run). Jaguars 23–20.
- JAX – Jimmy Smith 16-yard pass from Mark Brunell (Mike Hollis kick). Jaguars 30–20.
- DEN – Ed McCaffrey 15-yard pass from John Elway (Jason Elam kick). Jaguars 30–27.

Top passers

- JAX – Mark Brunell – 18/29, 245 yards, 2 TD
- DEN – John Elway – 25/38, 226 yards, 2 TD, INT

Top rushers

- JAX – Natrone Means – 21 rushes, 140 yards, TD
- DEN – Terrell Davis – 14 rushes, 91 yards, TD

Top receivers

- JAX – Keenan McCardell – 5 receptions, 71 yards, TD
- DEN – Anthony Miller – 5 receptions, 67 yards

The wild-card Jaguars, who had barely made the playoffs with a 9–7 record by winning their last five games of the season (including their final one when Atlanta Falcons kicker Morten Andersen missed a last-second potential game-winning 30-yard field goal), overcame a 12-point deficit by racking up 443 yards (including 202 on the ground) and scoring on six consecutive possessions to upset the Broncos, who had finished the season with an NFL best 13–3 record (and had rested most of their starters over the last three games after clinching the #1 AFC seed at 12–1) and were favored to win by over 14 points. The Broncos' loss meant that for the second consecutive year the AFC's top seed was eliminated in the divisional round.

Denver dominated the first quarter, scoring two touchdowns while preventing the Jaguars from gaining a single first down. At the end of the Broncos' first drive, Tom Rouen's 35-yard punt pinned the Jags back on their own 10-yard line. Three plays later, Rod Smith returned Bryan Barker's 41-yard punt 6 yards to midfield. On Denver's second drive, a 47-yard run by Terrell Davis gave them a first down on the Jacksonville 2-yard line. The Jaguars kept Denver out of the end zone for the next three plays, but Vaughn Hebron scored a 1-yard touchdown run on fourth down, giving Denver a 6–0 lead after defensive end Clyde Simmons blocked the extra point. Then after the Broncos' defense forced a punt, Elway completed 4/4 passes for 57 yards on a 64-yard drive that ended on his 18-yard scoring connection to tight end Shannon Sharpe. But Elway's 2-point conversion pass to Sharpe was incomplete, keeping the score at 12–0.

In the second quarter, Jacksonville stormed back. First an 18-yard run by Natrone Means set up a 46-yard field goal by Mike Hollis. The next time the Jags got the ball, they cut their deficit to 12–10 with an 11-play, 80-yard scoring drive. After a controversial pass interference penalty wiped out a Tory James interception for Denver, Means gained 29 yards on a reception at the Broncos' 42, and later took the ball across the goal line on an 8-yard run. Following a Denver punt, Jacksonville got the ball back with 57 seconds left. Mark Brunell then completed a 43-yard pass to receiver Jimmy Smith to set up Hollis's 42-yard field goal, giving the team a 13–12 halftime lead.

In the third quarter, Denver was limited to 14 plays for 37 yards. Meanwhile, Brunell connected on a 31-yard touchdown pass to wide receiver Keenan McCardell. Hollis later kicked a 22-yard field goal at the end of an 88-yard, 12-play drive that included James Stewart's 25-yard reception and a 12-men on the field penalty against the Broncos that gave Jacksonville a first down as they were getting ready to punt. This score, the fifth consecutive scoring possession against the fourth-ranked defense in the NFL, gave the Jags a 23–12 lead with less than 11 minutes left in the game. On Denver's next series, Hebron's 38-yard kickoff return fired up a 57-yard drive that ended on Davis's 2-yard touchdown run, and then his successful two-point conversion run shrunk the lead to 23–20. But Jacksonville responded with another touchdown drive, featuring a 29-yard run by Brunell to the Denver 21-yard line in which he covered both sidelines, broke one tackle and eluded three other defenders. Shortly later, he finished the drive with a 16-yard touchdown pass to Smith with 3:39 remaining, making the score 30–20. The Broncos then drove 80 yards in six plays and scored on Elway's 15-yard touchdown to wide receiver Ed McCaffrey with 1:50 left, but they had no timeouts left and Jason Elam's onside kick attempt was recovered by the Jaguars to secure the win.

Brunell had the best postseason performance of his career, throwing for 245 yards and two touchdowns without an interception, and also rushing for 44 yards. Means rushed for 140 yards and a touchdown, while also catching four passes for 46 yards. Davis rushed for 91 yards and a touchdown, while also catching seven passes for 24 yards. It was the only playoff game of his career in which he didn't rush for 100 yards.

"What Brunell did at the end of the game was incredible," Jacksonville coach Tom Coughlin said. "Our football team just hung in it, and that touchdown to Jimmy Smith in that situation was huge. I told the players at the beginning of the week I believed we could win. I didn't know how it would come down. I didn't give them that script."

"I'm just going to go home, sit on my couch and probably cry," said Sharpe after the game.

Red Cashion, the game's referee retired after this game, capping off a 25-year career in the NFL that saw him referee two Super Bowls, XX and XXX.

The game was featured as one of the NFL's Greatest Games as Ambush at Mile High. This game was also the original "Mile High Miracle", which is now more commonly used to describe the 2012 divisional playoff game between the Denver Broncos (the #1 seed at 13–3) and the Baltimore Ravens (the #4 seed at 10–6).

This was the first postseason meeting between the Broncos and Jaguars, and the last time the Broncos ever wore their "Orange Crush" uniforms, they would bring them back just one more time as alternate uniforms in 2001.

=== Sunday, January 5, 1997 ===
==== AFC: New England Patriots 28, Pittsburgh Steelers 3 ====
Pittsburgh Steelers vs. New England Patriots – Game summary

Quarter	1	2	3	4	Total
Steelers	0	0	3	0	3
Patriots	14	7	0	7	28

at Foxboro Stadium, Foxborough, Massachusetts

- Game time: 12:30 p.m. EST
- Game weather: 48 °F (9 °C), foggy
- Game attendance: 60,188
- Referee: Bernie Kukar
- TV announcers (NBC): Marv Albert (play-by-play), Randy Cross, and Sam Wyche (color commentators)

Game information

First quarter

- NE – Curtis Martin 2-yard run (Adam Vinatieri kick). Patriots 7–0.

Second quarter

- NE – Keith Byars 24-yard pass from Drew Bledsoe (Adam Vinatieri kick). Patriots 14–0.
- NE – Curtis Martin 78-yard run (Adam Vinatieri kick). Patriots 21–0.

Third quarter

- No scoring plays

Fourth quarter

- PIT – Norm Johnson 29-yard field goal. Patriots 21–3.
- NE – Curtis Martin 23-yard run (Adam Vinatieri kick). Patriots 28–3.

Top passers

- PIT – Mike Tomczak – 16/29, 110 yards, 2 INT
- NE – Drew Bledsoe – 14/24, 164 yards, TD, 2 INT

Top rushers

- PIT – Jerome Bettis – 12 rushes, 43 yards
- NE – Curtis Martin – 19 rushes, 166 yards, 3 TD

Top receivers

- PIT – Andre Hastings – 5 receptions, 55 yards
- NE – Terry Glenn – 5 receptions, 96 yards

In their first home playoff game in 18 years, the Patriots blew out the Steelers 28–3 with 346 yards of total offense, while limiting the Steelers to 213.

On the first play from scrimmage, the Steelers got a taste of what lay in store as Pats quarterback Drew Bledsoe completed a 53-yard pass to Terry Glenn that set up Curtis Martin's 2-yard touchdown run. Pittsburgh was quickly forced to punt, and New England took just four plays to score again, the last a 34-yard touchdown on a screen pass from Bledsoe to fullback Keith Byars, giving the team a 14–0 lead just over seven minutes into the first quarter. Then on the first play of the second quarter, Martin burst through a hole in the right line, dodged a tackle attempt by Carnell Lake, and raced 78 yards for a touchdown. This would end up not only being the longest run of his Hall of Fame career, but this was the second longest scoring run in NFL postseason history. Near the end of the half, Steelers cornerback Willie Williams intercepted a pass from Bledsoe to give his team a chance to get back in the game. But Pittsburgh turned the ball over on downs on the Pats' 24-yard line and the score remained 21–0 going into halftime.

The Steelers lone score of the game occurred with 3:50 left in the third quarter, when linebacker Chad Brown's interception of a Bledsoe pass led to a 29-yard field goal by Norm Johnson. Pittsburgh then got the ball back on their own 36 following a Patriots punt, but any hope of a comeback was dashed when safety Lawyer Milloy intercepted a pass from Mike Tomczak on the New England 39-yard line. Six plays later, Martin's 23-yard touchdown run increased New England's lead to 28–3. In the fourth quarter, the Steelers managed a drive to the Patriots 15, only to lose the ball again on an interception by linebacker Willie Clay.

Martin finished the day with 166 rushing yards and three touchdowns, while running back Dave Meggett returned seven punts for 72 yards and rushed for 18. Tomczak was held to 110 passing yards and intercepted twice in the final postseason game of his career. He was periodically replaced by versatile quarterback Kordell Stewart, but he fared no better, finishing the game 0/10 on pass attempts. Steelers running back Jerome Bettis, who rushed for 1,431 yards during the season and 102 yards in the previous playoff game, was held to just 43 yards on the ground and was limited by groin and ankle injuries. This was New England's first playoff win since their 1985 Super Bowl season.

"That might be my longest run ever", Martin (a Pittsburgh native) said after the game about his 78-yard score. "College, Pop Warner, everything. To me, the Steelers are my second-favorite team. I kind of worry about when I go home, how infamous I'll be."

This was the first postseason meeting between the Steelers and Patriots.

==== NFC: Carolina Panthers 26, Dallas Cowboys 17 ====
Dallas Cowboys vs. Carolina Panthers – Game summary

Quarter	1	2	3	4	Total
Cowboys	3	8	3	3	17
Panthers	7	10	3	6	26

at Ericsson Stadium, Charlotte, North Carolina

- Game time: 4:00 p.m. EST
- Game weather: 71 °F (22 °C), clear
- Game attendance: 72,808
- Referee: Johnny Grier
- TV announcers (Fox): Pat Summerall (play-by-play) and John Madden (color commentator)
- Box score

Game information

First quarter

- DAL – Chris Boniol 22-yard field goal. Cowboys 3–0.
- CAR – Wesley Walls 1-yard pass from Kerry Collins (John Kasay kick). Panthers 7–3.

Second quarter

- CAR – Willie Green 10-yard pass from Kerry Collins (John Kasay kick). Panthers 14–3.
- DAL – Daryl Johnston 2-yard pass from Troy Aikman (pass failed). Panthers 14–9.
- DAL – Carolina snap out of end zone. Panthers 14–11.
- CAR – John Kasay 24-yard field goal. Panthers 17–11.

Third quarter

- DAL – Chris Boniol 21-yard field goal. Panthers 17–14.
- CAR – John Kasay 40-yard field goal. Panthers 20–14.

Fourth quarter

- CAR – John Kasay 40-yard field goal. Panthers 23–14.
- DAL – Chris Boniol 21-yard field goal. Panthers 23–17.
- CAR – John Kasay 32-yard field goal. Panthers 26–17.

Top passers

- DAL – Troy Aikman – 18/36, 165 yards, TD, 3 INT
- CAR – Kerry Collins – 12/22, 100 yards, 2 TD, INT

Top rushers

- DAL – Emmitt Smith – 22 rushes, 80 yards
- CAR – Anthony Johnson – 26 rushes, 104 yards

Top receivers

- DAL – Kevin Williams – 6 receptions, 89 yards
- CAR – Willie Green – 5 receptions, 53 yards, TD

The second-year Panthers held Cowboys quarterback Troy Aikman to 165 passing yards and forced three interceptions en route to their first playoff win in team history. On offense, running back Anthony Johnson was their top performer with 104 rushing yards and a 9-yard reception.

Dallas scored first when an interception by safety Darren Woodson on his own 47 and a 22-yard catch by Michael Irvin sparking a drive to the Panthers' 1-yard line. However, Irvin suffered a separated shoulder on his reception and had to miss the rest of the game. Meanwhile, Dallas could not get into the end zone despite two chances from the 1. Aikman threw an incomplete pass on second down, and on third down, Emmitt Smith was dropped for a three-yard loss, forcing the team to settle for Chris Boniol's 22-yard field goal. On the Panthers' ensuing drive, Dallas cornerback Kevin Smith kept it going with a pass interference penalty on third down, enabling Carolina quarterback Kerry Collins to complete the 68-yard possession with a 1-yard touchdown pass to tight end Wesley Walls. On their next series, Winslow Oliver's 15-yard punt return set up a 42-yard drive that ended with Collins's 10-yard touchdown throw to Willie Green, giving the team a 14–3 lead in the second quarter.

The Cowboys countered with a 73-yard drive to score on Aikman's 2-yard touchdown pass to fullback Daryl Johnston, but they failed on the two-point conversion attempt and the Panthers lead was only cut to 14–9. They later got to 14–11 when a bad snap on a Carolina punt attempt went out of the end zone to give the Cowboys a safety. But then Panthers safety Chad Cota intercepted a pass from Aikman and returned it 49 yards to set up kicker John Kasay's 24-yard field goal with three seconds in the half, giving Carolina a 17–11 halftime lead.

Early in the second half, Oliver fumbled a punt return that Johnston recovered to set up a Boniol field goal, cutting the deficit to 17–14. But this was as close as the Cowboys would get, as the Panthers kicked three more field goals over the Cowboys' one. On the ensuing drive, Johnson rushed six times for 44 yards to set up Kasay's 40-yard field goal. Then after a punt, he carried the ball six times for 22 yards to set up another score on Kasay's 40-yard kick a few plays into the fourth quarter.

Dallas responded with a 78-yard drive, including a 25-yard run by Smith and a 16-yard run by Deion Sanders, to score on Boniol's 21-yard field goal, cutting the Cowboys' deficit to 23–17. Then the Cowboys forced a punt, getting the ball back with over 11 minutes still remaining on the clock, but Rohn Stark's kick was downed by Johnson on the Dallas 2-yard line. Then upon reaching their 37, Aikman threw a pass that was intercepted by Pat Terrell and returned 49 yards to the Cowboys' 19-yard line, setting up Kasay's fourth field goal to make the score 26–17. The next time Dallas got the ball, Aikman was intercepted again, this time by Sam Mills, enabling Carolina to run out the clock and win the game.

This was the first postseason meeting between the Panthers and Cowboys.

== Conference championships ==
=== Sunday, January 12, 1997 ===
==== NFC: Green Bay Packers 30, Carolina Panthers 13 ====
Carolina Panthers vs. Green Bay Packers – Game summary

Quarter	1	2	3	4	Total
Panthers	7	3	3	0	13
Packers	0	17	10	3	30

at Lambeau Field, Green Bay, Wisconsin

- Game time: 12:30 p.m. EST/11:30 a.m. CST
- Game weather: 8 °F (−13 °C), clear
- Game attendance: 60,216
- Referee: Bob McElwee
- TV announcers (Fox): Pat Summerall (play-by-play) and John Madden (color commentator)
- Box score

Game information

First quarter

- CAR – Howard Griffith 3-yard pass from Kerry Collins (John Kasay kick). Panthers 7–0.

Second quarter

- GB – Dorsey Levens 29-yard pass from Brett Favre (Chris Jacke kick). Tied 7–7.
- CAR – John Kasay 22-yard field goal. Panthers 10–7.
- GB – Antonio Freeman 6-yard pass from Brett Favre (Chris Jacke kick). Packers 14–10.
- GB – Chris Jacke 31-yard field goal. Packers 17–10.

Third quarter

- GB – Chris Jacke 32-yard field goal. Packers 20–10.
- CAR – John Kasay 23-yard field goal. Packers 20–13.
- GB – Edgar Bennett 4-yard run (Chris Jacke kick). Packers 27–13.

Fourth quarter

- GB – Chris Jacke 28-yard field goal. Packers 30–13.

Top passers

- CAR – Kerry Collins – 19/37, 215 yards, TD, 2 INT
- GB – Brett Favre – 19/29, 292 yards, 2 TD, INT

Top rushers

- CAR – Anthony Johnson – 11 rushes, 31 yards
- GB – Edgar Bennett – 25 rushes, 99 yards, TD

Top receivers

- CAR – Mark Carrier – 4 receptions, 65 yards
- GB – Dorsey Levens – 5 receptions, 117 yards, TD

The Packers recorded 201 rushing yards and 476 total yards of offense. Green Bay running back Dorsey Levens recorded 117 yards receiving and 88 yards rushing, including a 29-yard touchdown catch. Quarterback Brett Favre managed to overcome two early turnovers that set up 10 Carolina points, completing 19 out of 29 passes for 292 yards and two touchdowns. Packers running back Edgar Bennett, who recorded 99 rushing yards, scored a touchdown from four yards out, and kicker Chris Jacke added three field goals. Carolina was held to just 251 total yards and had only one drive longer than 42 yards.

Early in the first quarter, Panthers linebacker Sam Mills intercepted a pass from Favre and returned it 10 yards to the Packers' 3-yard line, setting up Kerry Collins's 3-yard touchdown pass to fullback Howard Griffith. Green Bay struck back with a 35-yard run by Levens before Favre found him in the end zone for a 29-yard touchdown catch. But after the Packers forced a punt, Favre inexplicably dropped the ball while scrambling around in the backfield. Carolina defensive end Lamar Lathon recovered the fumble on the Packers' 45-yard line. A few plays later, John Kasay's 22-yard field goal put the Panthers back in the lead, 10–7.

But after that the Packers dominated the rest of the game. Favre responded by leading Green Bay 71 yards in 15 plays and scoring with a 6-yard touchdown pass to Antonio Freeman. Then on the first play after the ensuing kickoff, Tyrone Williams intercepted a pass from Collins on the Packers' 38-yard line. Favre's completions to Andre Rison and Freeman for gains of 23 and 25 yards moved the ball into field-goal range, and Jacke's 31-yard field goal finished the drive, giving Green Bay a 17–10 halftime lead.

On the first drive of the second half, Green Bay moved the ball 73 yards in 11 plays and scored with another Jacke field goal. The Panthers managed to respond with an 11-play, 73-yard drive of their own and score with Kasay's second field goal, which cut their deficit to seven points. But Green Bay stormed right back with a 74-yard touchdown drive, featuring a 66-yard reception by Levens. On the next play, Bennett's 4-yard touchdown run gave the Packers a 27–13 lead with two minutes left in the third quarter. In the fourth quarter, Packers defensive tackle Gilbert Brown slapped the ball out of the hands of running back Anthony Johnson and safety LeRoy Butler recovered the fumble, leading to Jacke's third field goal that made the score 30–13 with 10:02 left in the game.

This NFC Championship Game was the first one since 1991 that did not feature either the Dallas Cowboys or San Francisco 49ers. It was the first one ever to not feature either the Cowboys, Redskins, 49ers, or Rams.

This was the first postseason meeting between the Panthers and Packers.

==== AFC: New England Patriots 20, Jacksonville Jaguars 6 ====
Jacksonville Jaguars vs. New England Patriots – Game summary

Quarter	1	2	3	4	Total
Jaguars	0	3	3	0	6
Patriots	7	6	0	7	20

at Foxboro Stadium, Foxborough, Massachusetts

- Game time: 4:00 p.m. EST
- Game weather: 26 °F (−3 °C), partly cloudy
- Game attendance: 60,190
- Referee: Jerry Markbreit
- TV announcers (NBC): Dick Enberg (play-by-play), Phil Simms, and Paul Maguire (color commentators)

Game information

First quarter

- NE – Curtis Martin 1-yard run (Adam Vinatieri kick). Patriots 7–0.

Second quarter

- JAX – Mike Hollis 32-yard field goal. Patriots 7–3.
- NE – Adam Vinatieri 29-yard field goal. Patriots 10–3.
- NE – Adam Vinatieri 20-yard field goal. Patriots 13–3.

Third quarter

- JAX – Mike Hollis 28-yard field goal. Patriots 13–6.

Fourth quarter

- NE – Otis Smith 47-yard fumble return (Adam Vinatieri kick). Patriots 20–6.

Top passers

- JAX – Mark Brunell – 20/38, 190 yards, 2 INT
- NE – Drew Bledsoe – 20/33, 178 yards, INT

Top rushers

- JAX – Natrone Means – 19 rushes, 43 yards
- NE – Curtis Martin – 19 rushes, 59 yards, TD

Top receivers

- JAX – Pete Mitchell – 7 receptions, 63 yards
- NE – Shawn Jefferson – 4 receptions, 91 yards

Although New England gained just 234 yards compared to the Jags' 289, they made up the difference by forcing four turnovers, including three consecutive takeaways on the last three Jacksonville possessions of the game.

The Jaguars were forced to punt on their first possession, but a high snap enabled cornerback Larry Whigham to tackle punter Bryan Barker at the Jacksonville 4-yard line. Moments later, New England running back Curtis Martin scored a touchdown on a 1-yard run. After a few punts, New England managed a drive into Jaguars' territory, but cornerback Aaron Beasley intercepted Drew Bledsoe's pass at the 8-yard line to keep the score 7–0 at the end of the first quarter.

In the second quarter, Jaguars kicker Mike Hollis made a 32-yard field goal at the end of a 13-play, 62-yard drive. Their defense then forced the Patriots to punt, but returner Chris Hudson lost the ball from a hit by Marty Moore and Mike Bartrum recovered for New England on the Jags' 19-yard line. Adam Vinatieri kicked a 29-yard field goal as a result of the turnover, making the score 10–3. Later on, with 1:29 left in the half, Bledsoe led the Patriots down the field on a 68-yard drive, completing a 19-yard pass to Shawn Jefferson, a 5-yard toss to tight end Ben Coates on fourth and 5, and another completion to Jefferson that moved the ball 38 yards to the Jacksonville 3-yard line. New England could go no further, however, so Vinatieri kicked his second field goal of the day to increase their lead to 13–3 going into halftime.

Jacksonville took the second-half kickoff and drove to the New England 31-yard line, only to lose the ball when quarterback Mark Brunell was stuffed for no gain on fourth and 1. Three plays later, Bledsoe lost a fumble while being tackled by Kevin Hardy, which linebacker Eddie Robinson recovered for Jacksonville on the Pats' 37 to set up a 28-yard Hollis field goal that cut the score to 13–6.

Midway through the fourth quarter, the Patriots drove to the Jacksonville 23-yard line. They were in prime position to build a big lead, but Bledsoe was sacked for a 6-yard loss on third down and Vinatieri drilled his 46-yard field goal attempt wide left. Jacksonville took the ball back and drove to the New England 5-yard line, but with just under four minutes left in the game, Patriots safety Willie Clay intercepted a Brunell pass in the end zone. Following a punt, Jacksonville got another chance to drive for the tying touchdown with 2:36 left. However, this time they lost the ball on their first play with a fumble by James Stewart. New England cornerback Otis Smith recovered the ball and returned it 47 yards for the game-clinching touchdown, giving his team a 20–6 lead. Jacksonville would get one more possession, which ended with an interception by middle linebacker Tedy Bruschi.

The game was also notable for a power outage (due to the power use at and around the stadium due to very cold temperatures) just minutes before halftime, which knocked out much of the lighting of the stadium, as well as most of the power in the surrounding community. (The television broadcast, however, was not affected, and stayed on throughout the outage by using generators.)

This was the first postseason meeting between the Patriots and Jaguars.

== Super Bowl XXXI: Green Bay Packers 35, New England Patriots 21 ==
Super Bowl XXXI – New England Patriots vs. Green Bay Packers – Game summary

Quarter	1	2	3	4	Total
Patriots (AFC)	14	0	7	0	21
Packers (NFC)	10	17	8	0	35

at Louisiana Superdome, New Orleans, Louisiana

- Date: January 26, 1997
- Game attendance: 72,301
- Referee: Gerald Austin
- TV announcers (Fox): Pat Summerall (play-by-play) and John Madden (color commentator)

This was the first Super Bowl meeting between the Patriots and Packers.

== Bibliography ==
- Total Football: The Official Encyclopedia of the National Football League (ISBN 0-06-270174-6)
