= Eric Moulds =

American football player (born 1973)

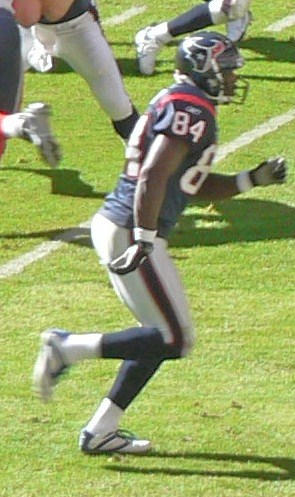
- Moulds with the Houston Texans in 2006

No. 80, 84, 83
- Position: Wide receiver

Personal information
- Born: July 17, 1973 (age 53); Lucedale, Mississippi, U.S.
- Listed height: 6 ft 2 in (1.88 m)
- Listed weight: 225 lb (102 kg)

Career information
- High school: George County (Lucedale)
- College: Mississippi State (1992–1995)
- NFL draft: 1996: 1st round, 24th overall pick

Career history
- Buffalo Bills (1996–2005); Houston Texans (2006); Tennessee Titans (2007)

Awards and highlights
- 2× Second-team All-Pro (1998, 2002); 3× Pro Bowl (1998, 2000, 2002); PFWA All-Rookie Team (1996); Buffalo Bills 50th Anniversary Team; First-team All-SEC (1995); Second-team All-SEC (1994)

Career NFL statistics
- Receptions: 764
- Receiving yards: 9,995
- Receiving touchdowns: 49
- Stats at Pro Football Reference

Eric Shannon Moulds (born July 17, 1973) is an American former professional football player who was a wide receiver for 12 seasons in the National Football League (NFL). He played college football for Mississippi State University and was selected by the Buffalo Bills 24th overall in the 1996 NFL draft. In 2009, Moulds (affectionately called E-Money for short) was one of three receivers named to the Buffalo Bills 50th Anniversary All-Time Team.

== Early life ==
Eric Shannon Moulds was born on July 17, 1973, in Lucedale, Mississippi. He attended George County High School in Lucedale.

== College career ==
At Mississippi State University, Moulds caught 117 passes for 2,022 yards (averaging 17.1 per catch). He ranks fifth in yards and fourth in touchdowns on Mississippi State's career receiving list. 1993, he had 17 catches for 398 yards and 4 TD while being utilized as a vertical receiver. In 1994, he had 39 catches for 845 yards and 7 TD. He followed that up in 1995 with 62 catches for 779 yards and 6 TD.

In 1994, Moulds led the NCAA Division I-A in kickoff returns with a 32.8 yds/return average.

== Professional career ==
Pre-draft measurables
Height	Weight	Arm length	Hand span
6 ft 0 7/8 in (1.85 m)	204 lb (93 kg)	32 in (0.81 m)	9 1/4 in (0.23 m)

=== 1996 NFL draft ===
Several NFL teams were hesitant to draft Moulds because of perceived character issues. One Dallas Cowboys scout characterized Moulds as a "me guy", and Chicago Bears head coach Dave Wannstedt told a scout that he would not draft Moulds in any round because Moulds had once ordered a pizza to be delivered to the field before a game and had refused to participate in a team meeting after the Senior Bowl game, in which he dropped nine passes.

=== Buffalo Bills ===
Moulds was the Bills' first round draft pick (24th overall) in 1996. For his first two seasons, Moulds was stuck on the depth chart behind receivers Andre Reed and Quinn Early.

Moulds finally had his breakout season in 1998, where set a single-season team record with 1,368 receiving yards, a total that led the AFC and was second in the league. That record would stand until 2020, when Stefon Diggs would earn a total of 1,535 yards. Moulds also has the Bills' third-highest single-season total, with 1,326 in 2002. Moulds's 20.4 yards per catch was second in the NFL in 1998.

In his eight seasons as the number one receiver for the Bills (1998–2005), Moulds had 626 receptions for 8,523 yards, an average of 78.25 catches and 1,065 yards per season. Moulds's yardage was 7th-most in the NFL over that span.

In 2002, Moulds became the first player in Bills history to log 100 receptions in a single season. His team record for receptions in a season would stand until Stefon Diggs broke the record in 2020 with 127.

In the playoffs, Moulds had an NFL playoff record 240 receiving yards against the Miami Dolphins, though he notably lost a fumble on the Bills' first play, a 65-yard pass from Doug Flutie. Buffalo lost 24–17.

Moulds established himself as one of the premier receivers in football in the late 1990s and early 2000s, amassing 764 career receptions and being selected to three Pro Bowls (1998, 2000, 2002).

In 2005 Moulds was suspended for one game for conduct detrimental to the team for a sideline dispute with wide receivers coach Tyke Tolbert in a 24–23 loss at Miami in which the Bills blew a lead in the fourth quarter.

=== 2006 and 2007 seasons ===
On April 4, 2006, Moulds was traded to the Houston Texans, in exchange for their fifth round draft pick in the 2006 NFL draft, which the Bills would eventually use on future All-Pro defensive tackle Kyle Williams. Moulds was released from the Texans after the 2006 season. After his release, Moulds criticized then-Texans quarterback David Carr, saying "[t]he quarterback has to show that he can carry [the team]."

The Tennessee Titans signed Moulds on July 25, 2007, and at the beginning of the season he had earned a starting position. Moulds played in all 16 games in 2007, having the 4th most receptions on his team, 2nd most by wide receivers, with 32 catches for 342 yards. The Titans released Moulds after the 2007 season, which was his last in professional football.

== Career statistics ==
=== NFL ===
==== Regular season ====
Legend
**Bold**	Career high

Year	Team	GP	Receiving						Fumbles	
Year	Team	GP	Rec	Yds	Avg	Lng	TD	FD	Fum	Lost
1996	BUF	16	20	279	14.0	47	2	11	0	0
1997	BUF	16	29	294	10.1	32	0	18	**1**	0
1998	BUF	16	67	**1,368**	**20.4**	**84**	9	54	0	0
1999	BUF	14	65	994	15.3	54	7	44	**1**	**1**
2000	BUF	16	94	1,326	14.1	52	5	62	**1**	0
2001	BUF	16	67	904	13.5	80	5	42	**1**	**1**
2002	BUF	16	**100**	1,292	12.9	70	**10**	**64**	**1**	0
2003	BUF	13	64	780	12.2	49	1	35	0	0
2004	BUF	16	88	1,043	11.9	49	5	53	**1**	**1**
2005	BUF	15	81	816	10.1	55	4	38	0	0
2006	HOU	16	57	557	9.8	29	1	33	**1**	0
2007	TEN	16	32	342	10.7	46	0	21	0	0
Career		186	764	9,995	13.0	84	49	475	7	3

==== Playoffs ====
Year	Team	GP	Receiving						Fumbles	
Year	Team	GP	Rec	Yds	Avg	Lng	TD	FD	Fum	Lost
1996	BUF	1	0	0	0.0	0	0	0	0	0
1998	BUF	1	**9**	**240**	**26.7**	**65**	**1**	**8**	**1**	**1**
1999	BUF	1	3	62	20.7	37	0	3	0	0
2007	TEN	1	3	18	6.0	10	0	0	0	0
Career		4	15	320	21.3	65	1	11	1	1

=== College ===
Season	Team	GP	Receiving					Rushing			Kick returns			
Season	Team	GP	Rec	Yds	Avg	TD	Att	Yds	Avg	TD	Ret	Yds	Avg	TD
1993	Mississippi State	10	17	398	**23.4**	4	1	-2	-2.0	0	7	143	20.4	0
1994	Mississippi State	11	39	**845**	21.7	**7**	**3**	-8	-2.7	0	**13**	**426**	**32.8**	0
1995	Mississippi State	10	**62**	779	12.6	6	**3**	**1**	**0.3**	0	9	259	28.8	0
Total		31	118	2,022	17.1	17	7	-9	-1.3	1	29	828	28.6	0
