= Sam Gash =

American football player and coach (born 1969)

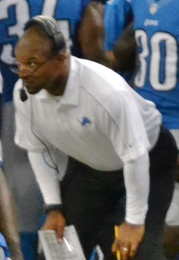
- Gash in 2012

No. 33, 32
- Position: Fullback

Personal information
- Born: March 7, 1969 (age 57); Hendersonville, North Carolina, U.S.
- Listed height: 6 ft 0 in (1.83 m)
- Listed weight: 242 lb (110 kg)

Career information
- High school: Hendersonville
- College: Penn State
- NFL draft: 1992: 8th round, 205th overall pick

Career history

Playing
- New England Patriots (1992–1997); Buffalo Bills (1998–1999); Baltimore Ravens (2000–2002); Buffalo Bills (2003); New Orleans Saints (2004)*
- * Offseason or practice squad member only

Coaching
- New York Jets (2006) Assistant running backs; Detroit Lions (2007) Assistant special teams; Detroit Lions (2008–2012) Running backs; Green Bay Packers (2014–2015) Running backs

Awards and highlights
- Super Bowl champion (XXXV); 2× Second-team All-Pro (1998, 1999); 2× Pro Bowl (1998, 1999)

Career NFL statistics
- Receptions: 169
- Total yards: 1,674
- Total touchdowns: 15
- Stats at Pro Football Reference

Samuel Lee Gash Jr. (born March 7, 1969) is an American former professional football player who was a fullback in the National Football League (NFL). He played college football for the Penn State Nittany Lions.

== Professional career ==
Pre-draft measurables
Height	Weight	Arm length	Hand span	40-yard dash	10-yard split	20-yard split	20-yard shuttle	Vertical jump	Broad jump	Bench press
5 ft 11 5/8 in (1.82 m)	224 lb (102 kg)	30 1/4 in (0.77 m)	9 1/8 in (0.23 m)	4.79 s	1.66 s	2.74 s	4.16 s	33.5 in (0.85 m)	9 ft 5 in (2.87 m)	16 reps

Gash was drafted in the eighth round of the 1992 NFL draft by the New England Patriots. A two time Pro Bowler in his twelve-year career, Gash played for the Patriots (1992–1997), Buffalo Bills (1998–1999, 2003), and the Baltimore Ravens (2000–2002). In 1999, Gash earned the unique distinction of being the first back in NFL history to be selected to the Pro Bowl without carrying the ball at all during the regular season. He won a Super Bowl in 2000 with the Baltimore Ravens. Gash was cut by the New Orleans Saints one day before the 2004 training camp began.

== Coaching ==
Gash began his coaching career in 2005 with the New York Jets as an assistant running backs coach. In January 2007, Gash was hired as the Detroit Lions' assistant special teams coach. In 2008, he became the Lions' running backs coach. Gash was fired by the Lions on December 31, 2012.

On February 10, 2014, Gash was announced as the running backs coach of the Green Bay Packers. On January 19, 2016, he was fired by the Packers.

== NFL career statistics ==
==== Regular season ====
Legend
	Won the Super Bowl
**Bold**	Career high

Year	Team	GP	GS	Receiving						Rushing						Fumbles	
Year	Team	GP	GS	Rec	Yds	Avg	Lng	TD	FD	Att	Yds	Avg	TD	FD	Lng	Fum	Lost
1992	NE	15	0	0	0	0.0	0	0	0	5	7	1.4	**1**	2	4	**1**	0
1993	NE	15	4	14	93	6.6	15	0	5	**48**	**149**	**3.1**	**1**	**15**	**14**	**1**	**1**
1994	NE	13	6	9	61	8.8	19	0	3	30	86	2.9	0	5	10	**1**	0
1995	NE	15	12	26	242	**9.3**	30	1	**15**	8	24	3.0	0	4	9	0	0
1996	NE	14	9	**33**	**276**	8.4	28	2	**15**	8	15	1.9	0	1	3	0	0
1997	NE	16	5	22	154	7.0	19	**3**	12	6	10	1.7	0	0	4	0	0
1998	BUF	16	13	19	165	8.7	20	**3**	12	11	32	2.9	0	3	11	0	0
1999	BUF	15	11	20	163	8.2	**31**	2	10	0	0	0.0	0	0	0	0	0
2000	BAL	15	4	6	30	5.0	9	1	1	2	2	1.0	0	0	1	0	0
2001	BAL	16	4	9	80	8.9	16	1	3	2	-1	-0.5	0	0	0	0	0
2002	BAL	11	0	0	0	0.0	0	0	0	0	0	0.0	0	0	0	0	0
2003	BUF	16	13	11	83	7.5	18	0	5	1	3	3.0	0	0	3	**1**	0
Career		177	78	169	1,347	8.0	31	13	81	121	327	2.7	2	30	14	4	2

==== Postseason ====
Year	Team	GP	GS	Receiving						Rushing						Fumbles	
Year	Team	GP	GS	Rec	Yds	Avg	Lng	TD	FD	Att	Yds	Avg	TD	FD	Lng	Fum	Lost
1994	NE	1	1	0	0	0.0	0	0	0	0	0	0.0	0	0	0	0	0
1997	NE	2	1	**2**	9	4.5	6	0	0	0	0	0.0	0	0	0	0	0
1998	BUF	1	1	1	9	9.0	9	0	0	0	0	0.0	0	0	0	0	0
1999	BUF	1	0	1	6	6.0	6	0	0	0	0	0.0	0	0	0	0	0
2000	BAL	4	3	1	7	7.0	7	0	0	**1**	0	0.0	0	0	0	0	0
2001	BAL	2	1	1	**13**	**13.0**	**13**	0	**1**	0	0	0.0	0	0	0	0	0
Career		11	7	6	44	7.3	13	0	1	1	0	0.0	0	0	0	0	0

== Personal life ==
Gash has relatives also involved with football. His younger brother, Eric, played outside linebacker at the University of North Carolina. In 2014 Eric Gash was selected as the head coach at his alma mater, Hendersonville High School, for the 2014 season. He is only the second African American hired as a head football coach at a western North Carolina high school since the late 1960s integration of public schools. The Gash brothers have a cousin, Thane, who played safety for the Cleveland Browns and San Francisco 49ers. His son, Isaiah, played college football for the Michigan Wolverines. Another son, Elijah, played college lacrosse for the Albany Great Danes and was drafted 30th overall in the 2023 Premier Lacrosse League draft by Whipsnakes Lacrosse Club. Elijah was drafted 46th overall in the 2023 National Lacrosse League draft by Panther City Lacrosse Club before being picked up the Toronto Rock in a dispersal draft after Panther City ceased operations in 2024.
