= Jason Bratton =

American football player (born 1972)

No. 29
- Position: Running back

Personal information
- Born: October 19, 1972 (age 54); Longview, Texas, U.S.
- Listed height: 6 ft 1 in (1.85 m)
- Listed weight: 252 lb (114 kg)

Career information
- College: Grambling State
- NFL draft: 1996: undrafted

Career history
- Buffalo Bills (1996); Baltimore Ravens (1997)*
- * Offseason or practice squad member only

Career NFL statistics
- Games: 2
- Rushing attempts: 4
- Rushing Yards: 8
- Stats at Pro Football Reference

Jason Edward Bratton (born October 19, 1972) is an American former professional football player who was a running back for the Buffalo Bills of the National Football League (NFL) in 1996. He played college football for the Grambling State Tigers.
