= Quinn Early =

American football player (born 1965)

No. 87, 89, 88
- Position: Wide receiver

Personal information
- Born: April 13, 1965 (age 61); West Hempstead, New York, U.S.
- Listed height: 6 ft 0 in (1.83 m)
- Listed weight: 190 lb (86 kg)

Career information
- High school: Great Neck South (Great Neck, New York)
- College: Iowa
- NFL draft: 1988: 3rd round, 60th overall pick

Career history
- San Diego Chargers (1988–1990); New Orleans Saints (1991–1995); Buffalo Bills (1996–1998); New York Jets (1999)

Awards and highlights
- First-team All-Big Ten (1987)

Career NFL statistics
- Receptions: 460
- Receiving yards: 6,448
- Receiving touchdowns: 40
- Stats at Pro Football Reference

Quinn Remar Early (born April 13, 1965) is an American former professional football player who was selected by the San Diego Chargers in the third round of the 1988 NFL draft. Early was a wide receiver who played college football for the University of Iowa Hawkeyes. Early played in 12 National Football League (NFL) seasons from 1988 to 1999.

== Early life and college ==
Early played high school football at Great Neck South High School in Great Neck, New York. He was an All-New York Team selection in track & field, as well as an All-County Team member in both football and basketball.

As a four-year letterwinner for the Iowa Hawkeyes, Early was named First Team All-Big Ten in 1987 as a wide receiver. He finished the 1987 season as the Big Ten leader in receptions, and finished second in receiving yards (978) and touchdowns (10). As a senior, he was named Third Team All-American.

Early helped the Hawkeyes win the 1985 Big Ten title, but their 45–28 loss to UCLA in the Rose Bowl marked the only bowl game loss during his college tenure. Early played for Iowa in the 1986 and 1987 Holiday Bowls and the 1984 Freedom Bowl. Both Holiday bowl victories in back-to-back seasons came by a single point:

- 1986: Iowa 39, Wyoming 38
- 1987: Iowa 20, San Diego State 19

At Iowa, Early was a receiving target for four future NFL quarterbacks: Chuck Long, Mark Vlasic, Chuck Hartlieb and Dan McGwire.

== Professional career ==
Pre-draft measurables
Height	Weight	Hand span	40-yard dash	10-yard split	20-yard split	20-yard shuttle	Vertical jump	Broad jump	Bench press
6 ft 0 1/8 in (1.83 m)	193 lb (88 kg)	9 1/2 in (0.24 m)	4.41 s	1.63 s	2.61 s	4.23 s	35.0 in (0.89 m)	9 ft 9 in (2.97 m)	9 reps
All values from NFL Combine

=== San Diego Chargers (1988–1990) ===
Early was selected 60th overall by the San Diego Chargers in the third round of the 1988 NFL draft, the 11th wide receiver to be drafted (and the second wide receiver selected by the Chargers behind first-round selection Anthony Miller of Tennessee. Early was the Hawkeyes' highest draft pick in 1988.

Early played three seasons with the Chargers, totaling 55 receptions, 739 yards and 5 touchdowns during that span. More than half of those figures came in his rookie season (29–375–4), as he missed 10 games in 1989, and started just three games in 1990.

=== New Orleans Saints (1991–1995) ===
Prior to the 1991 season, Early joined the New Orleans Saints, where he would remain for the next five seasons. He would reach the postseason for first time in 1991 and again in 1992. In a 1992 NFC Wild Card Game loss to the Philadelphia Eagles, Early caught a team-best seven passes for 93 yards and his only postseason touchdown, a 7-yard pass from Bobby Hebert.

His playing time and receptions increased annually during this period, peaking in 1995, when Early recorded career bests of 135 targets, 1,087 receiving yards and 8 touchdowns. In 1994, he caught a career-best 82 passes.

=== Buffalo Bills (1996–1998) ===
Early signed with the Buffalo Bills in 1996, reaching the playoffs in 1996 and 1998 (however, Early was not active for the 1998 playoffs).

Early's most productive season in Buffalo was 1996. In Week 2, Early caught a 63-yard touchdown pass in a 17–10 win over the New England Patriots. He also recorded a career-long 95-yard touchdown reception in the second quarter of a Week 14 loss at Indianapolis.

In the Bills' 1996-97 AFC Wild Card playoff loss to the Jacksonville Jaguars, Early recorded postseason bests in receptions (9) and receiving yards (122). The Jacksonville Jaguars, in their second season of play, defeated Buffalo 30–27 at Rich Stadium. It would be his last NFL postseason appearance.

=== New York Jets (1999) ===
Early retired after playing for the New York Jets in 1999. Despite playing in all 16 games, he recorded just three starts, collecting just six receptions for 83 yards.

== NFL career statistics ==
Legend
	Led the league
**Bold**	Career high

=== Regular season ===
Year	Team	Games		Receiving				
Year	Team	GP	GS	Rec	Yds	Avg	Lng	TD
1988	SDG	**16**	11	29	375	12.9	38	4
1989	SDG	6	3	11	126	11.5	21	0
1990	SDG	14	3	15	238	15.9	45	1
1991	NOR	15	12	32	541	16.9	52	2
1992	NOR	**16**	**16**	30	566	**18.9**	59	5
1993	NOR	**16**	15	45	670	14.9	63	6
1994	NOR	**16**	13	**82**	894	10.9	33	4
1995	NOR	**16**	15	81	**1,087**	13.4	70	**8**
1996	BUF	**16**	13	50	798	16.0	**95**	4
1997	BUF	**16**	**16**	60	853	14.2	45	5
1998	BUF	**16**	2	19	217	11.4	37	1
1999	NYJ	**16**	3	6	83	13.8	24	0
		179	122	460	6,448	14.0	95	40

=== Playoffs ===
Year	Team	Games		Receiving				
Year	Team	GP	GS	Rec	Yds	Avg	Lng	TD
1991	NOR	**1**	**1**	5	41	8.2	12	0
1992	NOR	**1**	**1**	7	93	13.3	20	**1**
1996	BUF	**1**	**1**	**9**	**122**	**13.6**	**25**	0
		3	3	21	256	12.2	25	1

== Martial arts and stuntman ==
Early taught Choy Li Fut Kung Fu in San Diego and has written and published for Inside Kung Fu magazine. Early also serves as a stunt performer (both credited and uncredited) in both movies and television. IMDb credits him as having been a stunt double in productions for actors Will Smith, Michael Dorn, Richard Roundtree, Shemar Moore, Mike Epps, Mykelti Williamson and Chike Okonkwo. His credits also include writing for television and film.

In January 2013, Early was one of several professionals named to a mentoring program for former number one overall draft pick JaMarcus Russell's potential return to the NFL.
