= Eric Smedley =

American football player (born 1973)

No. 40
- Position: Safety

Personal information
- Born: July 23, 1973 (age 53); Charleston, West Virginia, U.S.
- Listed height: 5 ft 11 in (1.80 m)
- Listed weight: 199 lb (90 kg)

Career information
- High school: Capital (Charleston)
- College: Indiana
- NFL draft: 1996: 7th round, 249th overall pick

Career history
- Buffalo Bills (1996–1998); Indianapolis Colts (1999)

Career NFL statistics
- Tackles: 35
- Sacks: 2
- Stats at Pro Football Reference

Eric Alan Smedley (born July 23, 1973) is an American former professional football player who was a safety in the National Football League (NFL). He was selected in the seventh round (249th overall) of the 1996 NFL draft after playing college football for the Indiana Hoosiers. He played four seasons in the NFL, three for the Buffalo Bills and one for the Indianapolis Colts.
