= 2011 Buffalo Bills season =

52nd season in franchise history; noted for collapse after strong start

- Owner: Ralph Wilson
- General manager: Buddy Nix
- Head coach: Chan Gailey
- Home stadium: Ralph Wilson Stadium

Results
- Record: 6–10
- Division place: 4th AFC East
- Playoffs: Did not qualify
- Pro Bowlers: None

Uniform
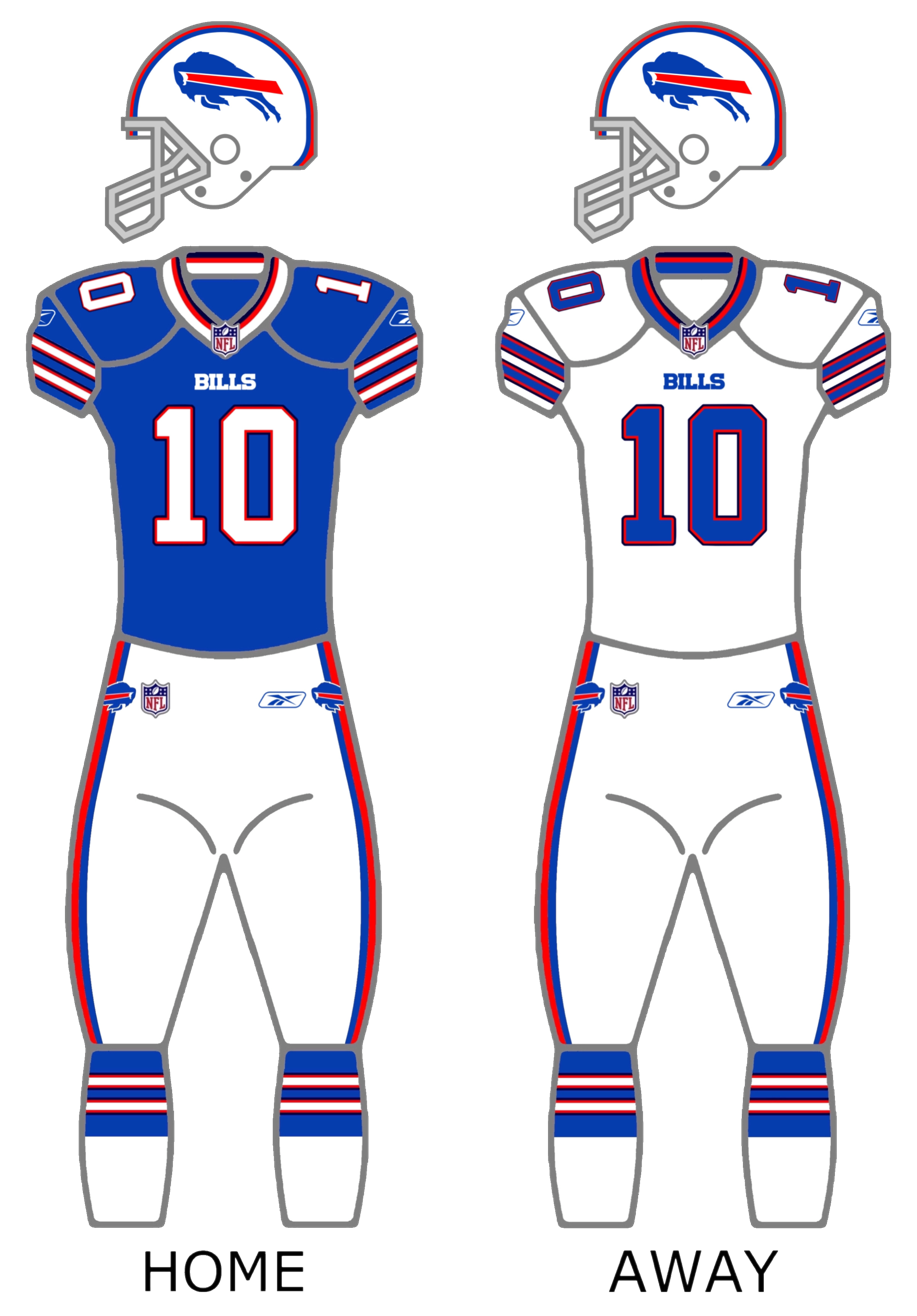

The 2011 season was the Buffalo Bills' 42nd in the National Football League (NFL) and their 52nd overall. The Bills improved on their 4–12 record from the 2010 season, winning six games. They won their first three games of the year, which included a victory over New England for their first victory over the Patriots since 2003; however, the team sputtered down the stretch (with a seven-game losing streak proving costly), missing the playoffs for the 12th consecutive season; the team had not made the playoffs since 1999, the longest standing playoff drought in the NFL at the time, after the Detroit Lions made the playoffs for the first time since 1999 during this season.

== Overview ==
In week 3 of the season, the Bills broke a 15-game losing streak that the team had accrued against the New England Patriots that dated to opening day of the 2003 season; Buffalo defeated the Patriots, 34–31. In doing so, the 2011 Bills became the only team since before 1950 (when comprehensive statistical record keeping began) to win two consecutive games in which they trailed by at least 18 points; they overcame a 21–3 deficit to Oakland in Week 2 and a 21–0 deficit to New England in Week 3. Incidentally, Buffalo's loss to the Cincinnati Bengals the following week was the Bills' first loss to Cincinnati since the 1988 AFC Championship game; that streak had been the longest winning streak by one team over another after Buffalo snapped their losing streak to New England.

The Bills started the season with a 5–2 record, positioned to make the playoffs, before losing eight of their final nine games, eliminating them from the playoffs. Wide receiver Stevie Johnson set a franchise mark as the only receiver in Bills history to record two consecutive 1,000-yard seasons. No other Bills receiver – including Andre Reed, James Lofton, Eric Moulds or Lee Evans – had done so. Buffalo's offense only surrendered 23 sacks all season, the fewest in the NFL.

=== Strong start, weak finish ===
The Bills were looking to make the playoffs for the first time since 1999, and enjoyed a 3–0 start, including a 21-point comeback against the New England Patriots in week 3. However, after a dominating Week Eight shutout win over Washington in Toronto (their only victory north of the border, as their Toronto Series was cancelled after the 2013 season), improving the team's record to 5-2, the remainder of the Bills' season was plagued by injuries to key starters. As a result, Buffalo suffered a seven-game losing streak to the New York Jets (twice), Dallas Cowboys, Miami Dolphins (twice), Tennessee Titans and San Diego Chargers, with the Week 14 loss to San Diego eliminating the team from postseason contention. With the Detroit Lions earning a playoff spot in Week 16, and the Houston Texans winning the AFC South in 2011, the Bills took sole possession of the NFL's longest current playoff drought, at 12 and counting.

The 2011 losing streak was eventually broken by defeating the Denver Broncos on Christmas Eve, a game that was blacked out in Western New York due to poor ticket sales. In the first seven games of the season (of which the Bills won five), the Bills had a +9 turnover differential (18 takeaways, 9 giveaways); from Week 9 until the end of the season, the Bills gave the ball away 21 times, with only 12 takeaways. Quarterback Ryan Fitzpatrick started the season strongly, posting a 97.8 passer rating and a 14/7 touchdown-interception ratio through the first seven games; in the final nine games, Fitzpatrick threw ten touchdowns and 16 interceptions, with a 66.5 quarterback rating in that span. His 23 total interceptions were the most thrown by any quarterback in the league in 2011. He threw only 5 interceptions total in the Bills' six wins and 18 in their ten losses. Bills wide receiver David Nelson stated that Fitzpatrick was injured by Redskins linebacker London Fletcher in Week 8, the last win before the losing streak began. Said Nelson, "A lot of people don't know, but Fitz during the Washington game actually cracked a couple of ribs. So after that, he was playing hurt."

=== Key injuries ===
Notable injuries included linebacker Shawne Merriman, center Eric Wood, cornerback Terrence McGee, star nose tackle Kyle Williams (as well as backup Torell Troup) and star running back Fred Jackson, all of whom were placed on injured reserve to end their respective seasons. (Note: Fred Jackson's deactivation was somewhat controversial, as it disqualified him from Pro Bowl consideration; Jackson, whose leg was expected to heal by the time of the Pro Bowl, was a contender for the game and would have been the only Bill to make the team, since the Bills had no players named to the contest. At the end of Week 10 (the game in which Jackson was injured), he was leading the NFL in rushing yards, with 917.) The Bills also lost two wide receivers that did not contribute significantly during the 2011 season, Marcus Easley and Roscoe Parrish, to IR (the former missing his second full season, the latter coming off a strong 2010 season) and two kickers, incumbent starter Rian Lindell and replacement Dave Rayner; the Bills were compelled to sign a third-string kicker, Brandon Coutu, for the final game of the 2011 season against New England. Rookie Marcell Dareus also admitted to playing much of the season with numerous injuries, but continued to stay on the field out of a personal obligation to the team. Starting quarterback Ryan Fitzpatrick also sustained an undisclosed injury as stated above, but was never listed on the injury report (nor was the injury ever specified) and Fitzpatrick continued to play the rest of the season.

== Offseason ==
=== Uniform change ===
On February 9, 2011, the Bills announced that the team planned to introduce redesigned uniforms for the 2011 season. No details were given on what the uniforms would look like, but it was said that the charging buffalo logo would be kept. Later reports leaked by a Madden NFL 12 trailer, and said to be confirmed by the league, indicated the team would be adopting the uniforms the team wore between 1975 and 1983. It was also announced that an official unveiling of the new uniforms would be at a fan appreciation event later in the summer. The uniforms were unveiled on June 24, 2011. The team also announced that the U.S. military would also be involved in the unveiling.

Due to the 2011 NFL lockout that ran from March 11 – July 25, actual Bills' players were prohibited from attending the event. Instead, models from the New York National Guard, along with former Bills Jim Kelly, Thurman Thomas, and Steve Tasker, modeled the new uniforms. This was the first full redesign of the team’s uniforms since the 2002 season.

The Bills wore their white jerseys at home against the New York Jets in Week Nine.

=== Draft ===
2011 Buffalo Bills draft
Round	Pick	Player	Position	College	Notes
1	3	Marcell Dareus *	DT	Alabama	
2	34	Aaron Williams	CB	Texas	
3	68	Kelvin Sheppard	LB	LSU	
4	100	Da'Norris Searcy	SS	North Carolina	
4	122	Chris Hairston	OT	Clemson	Pick from SEA^{[a]}
5	133	Johnny White	RB	North Carolina	
6	169	Chris White	LB	Mississippi St	
7	206	Justin Rogers	CB	Richmond	
7	245	Michael Jasper	DT	Bethel (TN)	Compensatory^{[b]}
Made roster † Pro Football Hall of Fame * Made at least one Pro Bowl during career

^{^[a]} The Bills acquired this fourth-round selection and a 2012 conditional draft selection in an October 2010 trade that sent RB Marshawn Lynch to the Seattle Seahawks.
^{^[b]} Compensatory selection.

== Staff ==
Buffalo Bills 2011 staff
Front office: President – Ralph Wilson; CEO – Russ Brandon; Executive vice president/general manager – Buddy Nix; Senior vice president of football administration – Jim Overdorf; Director of Football Administration – Don Purdy; Assistant general manager/director of player personnel – Doug Whaley; Player Personnel Analyst – Kevin Meganck; Director of pro personnel – Tom Gibbons; Pro Personnel Coordinator – Rob Hanrahan; Director of college scouting – Chuck Cook; Head coaches: Head coach – Chan Gailey; Assistant head coach/inside linebackers – Dave Wannstedt; Offensive coaches: Offensive coordinator/running backs – Curtis Modkins; Quarterbacks – George Cortez; Wide receivers – Stan Hixon; Tight ends – Bob Bicknell; Offensive line – Joe D'Alessandris; Assistant offensive line – Bobby Johnson; Offensive quality control – Kevin Patullo	Defensive coaches: Defensive coordinator – George Edwards; Defensive line – Giff Smith; Outside linebackers – Bob Sanders; Defensive backs – George Catavolos; Defensive quality control – Adrian White; Special teams coaches: Special teams coordinator – Bruce DeHaven; Assistant special teams – Stan Kwan; Strength and conditioning: Head strength and conditioning – Eric Ciano; Head strength and conditioning – John Gamble

== Final roster ==
2011 Buffalo Bills roster
Quarterbacks (QB): 14 Ryan Fitzpatrick; 4 Tyler Thigpen; Running backs (RB): 30 Tashard Choice; 38 Corey McIntyre FB; 28 C. J. Spiller PR; 20 Johnny White; Wide receivers (WR): 88 Kamar Aiken; 80 Derek Hagan; 13 Stevie Johnson; 82 Ruvell Martin; 86 David Nelson; 18 Naaman Roosevelt; 16 Brad Smith; Tight ends (TE): 87 Kevin Brock; 84 Scott Chandler; 89 Fendi Onobun	Offensive linemen (OL): 77 Demetress Bell T; 74 Colin Brown; 75 Chris Hairston T; 69 Michael Jasper T; 67 Andy Levitre G/T; 79 Erik Pears T; 76 Chad Rinehart G; 60 Kraig Urbik C/G; 71 Sam Young T; Defensive linemen (DL): 92 Alex Carrington DE; 99 Marcell Dareus DT; 97 Lionel Dotson DE; 98 Dwan Edwards DT; 73 Jarron Gilbert DE; 72 Kellen Heard DE; 91 Spencer Johnson DE; 90 Chris Kelsay DE; 94 Kyle Moore DE	Linebackers (LB): 50 Nick Barnett OLB; 57 Danny Batten OLB; 54 Andra Davis MLB; 52 Arthur Moats OLB; 58 Kirk Morrison MLB; 43 Bryan Scott OLB; 55 Kelvin Sheppard MLB; Defensive backs (DB): 31 Jairus Byrd FS; 27 Reggie Corner CB; 29 Drayton Florence CB; 21 Leodis McKelvin CB; 47 Joshua Nesbitt FS; 26 Justin Rogers CB; 25 Da'Norris Searcy SS; 23 Aaron Williams CB; 37 George Wilson SS; Special teams (ST): 10 Brandon Coutu K; 8 Brian Moorman P; 65 Garrison Sanborn LS	Practice squad: 48 Robert Eddins LB; 15 David Gilreath WR; 46 Doyle Miller CB; 44 Prince Miller CB; 93 Jay Ross DT; 17 Tim Toone WR; 62 Jake Vermiglio G; 68 Keith Williams G; Reserve: 83 Mike Caussin TE (IR); 33 Jon Corto FS (IR); 81 Marcus Easley WR (IR); 36 Bruce Hall RB (IR); 22 Fred Jackson RB (IR); 19 Donald Jones WR (IR); 9 Rian Lindell K (IR); 24 Terrence McGee CB (IR); 56 Shawne Merriman OLB (IR); 11 Roscoe Parrish WR (IR); 3 Dave Rayner K (IR); 85 Lee Smith TE (IR); 53 Reggie Torbor OLB (IR); 96 Torell Troup DT (IR); 51 Chris White OLB (IR); 95 Kyle Williams DT (IR); 70 Eric Wood C (IR); Rookies in italics 53 active, 17 reserve, 8 practice squad

== Schedule ==
=== Preseason ===
Week	Date	Opponent	Result	Record	Venue	Recap
1	August 13	at Chicago Bears	**L** 3–10	0–1	Soldier Field	Recap
2	August 20	at Denver Broncos	**L** 10–24	0–2	Sports Authority Field at Mile High	Recap
3	August 27	Jacksonville Jaguars	**W** 35–32 (OT)	1–2	Ralph Wilson Stadium	Recap
4	September 1	Detroit Lions	**L** 6–16	1–3	Ralph Wilson Stadium	Recap

=== Regular season ===
Week	Date	Opponent	Result	Record	Venue	Recap
1	September 11	at Kansas City Chiefs	**W** 41–7	1–0	Arrowhead Stadium	Recap
2	September 18	Oakland Raiders	**W** 38–35	2–0	Ralph Wilson Stadium	Recap
3	September 25	**New England Patriots**	**W** 34–31	3–0	Ralph Wilson Stadium	Recap
4	October 2	at Cincinnati Bengals	**L** 20–23	3–1	Paul Brown Stadium	Recap
5	October 9	Philadelphia Eagles	**W** 31–24	4–1	Ralph Wilson Stadium	Recap
6	October 16	at New York Giants	**L** 24–27	4–2	MetLife Stadium	Recap
7	Bye					
8	October 30	Washington Redskins	**W** 23–0	5–2	(Canada) Rogers Centre (Toronto)	Recap
9	November 6	**New York Jets**	**L** 11–27	5–3	Ralph Wilson Stadium	Recap
10	November 13	at Dallas Cowboys	**L** 7–44	5–4	Cowboys Stadium	Recap
11	November 20	at **Miami Dolphins**	**L** 8–35	5–5	Sun Life Stadium	Recap
12	November 27	at **New York Jets**	**L** 24–28	5–6	MetLife Stadium	Recap
13	December 4	Tennessee Titans	**L** 17–23	5–7	Ralph Wilson Stadium	Recap
14	December 11	at San Diego Chargers	**L** 10–37	5–8	Qualcomm Stadium	Recap
15	December 18	**Miami Dolphins**	**L** 23–30	5–9	Ralph Wilson Stadium	Recap
16	December 24	Denver Broncos	**W** 40–14	6–9	Ralph Wilson Stadium	Recap
17	January 1	at **New England Patriots**	**L** 21–49	6–10	Gillette Stadium	Recap

Note: Intra-division opponents are in bold text.

# Indicates the game was part of the Bills Toronto Series.

=== Game summaries ===
==== Week 1 ====
Team	1	2	3	4	Total
• Bills	14	6	14	7	41
Chiefs	0	7	0	0	7

- Date: September 11
- Location: Arrowhead Stadium, Kansas City, Missouri
- Game start: 1:00 p.m. EST
- Game attendance: 68,755
- Game weather: 75 °F (24 °C), sunny
- Referee: Scott Green
- TV announcers (CBS): Marv Albert and Rich Gannon

Scoring summary
Q1	12:14	BUF	Scott Chandler 4 yard pass from Ryan Fitzpatrick (Rian Lindell kick)	BUF 7-0
Q1	0:55	BUF	Stevie Johnson 27 yard pass from Ryan Fitzpatrick (Rian Lindell kick)	BUF 14-0
Q2	6:42	BUF	Rian Lindell 27 yard field goal	BUF 17-0
Q2	5:38	BUF	Rian Lindell 38 yard field goal	BUF 20-0
Q2	1:46	KC	Jamaal Charles 6 yard pass from Matt Cassel (Ryan Succop kick)	BUF 20-7
Q3	4:19	BUF	Scott Chandler 11 yard pass from Ryan Fitzpatrick (Rian Lindell kick)	BUF 27-7
Q3	0:14	BUF	Donald Jones 4 yard pass from Ryan Fitzpatrick (Rian Lindell kick)	BUF 34-7
Q4	11:50	BUF	C. J. Spiller 9 yard run (Rian Lindell kick)	BUF 41-7

With the win, the Bills start 1-0.

==== Week 2 ====
Team	1	2	3	4	Total
Raiders	0	21	0	14	35
• Bills	0	3	14	21	38

- Date: September 18
- Location: Ralph Wilson Stadium, Orchard Park, New York
- Game start: 1:00 p.m. EST
- Game attendance: 68,191
- Game weather: 65 °F (18 °C), sunny
- Referee: Mike Carey
- TV announcers (CBS): Kevin Harlan and Solomon Wilcots

Scoring summary
Q2	11:33	OAK	Michael Bush 1 yard run (Sebastian Janikowski kick)	OAK 7–0
Q2	8:08	OAK	Darren McFadden 5 yard run (Sebastian Janikowski kick)	OAK 14–0
Q2	2:22	BUF	Rian Lindell 25 yard field goal	OAK 14–3
Q2	1:22	OAK	Jason Campbell 1 yard run (Sebastain Janikowski kick)	OAK 21–3
Q3	13:26	BUF	Fred Jackson 43 yard run (Rian Lindell kick)	OAK 21–10
Q3	3:41	BUF	Stevie Johnson 7 yard pass from Ryan Fitzpatrick (Rian Lindell kick)	OAK 21–17
Q4	14:10	BUF	Fred Jackson 1 yard run (Rian Lindell kick)	BUF 24–21
Q4	9:18	OAK	Darren McFadden 12 yard pass from Jason Campbell (Sebastian Janikowski kick)	OAK 28–24
Q4	4:48	BUF	Scott Chandler 6 yard pass from Ryan Fitzpatrick (Rian Lindell kick)	BUF 31–28
Q4	3:41	OAK	Denarius Moore 50 yard pass from Jason Campbell (Sebastain Janikowski kick)	OAK 35–31
Q4	:14	BUF	David Nelson 6 yard pass from Ryan Fitzpatrick (Rian Lindell kick)	BUF 38–35

==== Week 3 ====
Team	1	2	3	4	Total
Patriots	14	7	3	7	31
• Bills	0	10	7	17	34

- Date: September 25
- Location: Ralph Wilson Stadium, Orchard Park, New York
- Game start: 1:00 p.m. EST
- Game attendance: 68,174
- Game weather: 78 °F (26 °C), partly cloudy
- Referee: Carl Cheffers
- TV announcers (CBS): Marv Albert and Rich Gannon

Scoring summary
Q1	9:45	NE	Wes Welker 14 yard pass from Tom Brady (Stephen Gostkowski kick)	NE 7–0
Q1	6:01	NE	Rob Gronkowski 1 yard pass from Tom Brady (Stephen Gostkowski kick)	NE 14–0
Q2	6:01	NE	Rob Gronkowski 26 yard pass from Tom Brady (Stephen Gostkowski kick)	NE 21–0
Q2	1:56	BUF	Stevie Johnson 11 yard pass from Ryan Fitzpatrick (Rian Lindell kick)	NE 21–7
Q2	:03	BUF	Rian Lindell 42 yard field goal	NE 21–10
Q3	9:34	BUF	Scott Chandler 3 yard pass from Ryan Fitzpatrick (Rian Lindell kick)	NE 21–17
Q3	4:51	NE	Stephen Gostkowski 23 yard field goal	NE 24–17
Q4	10:36	BUF	Fred Jackson 1 yard run (Rian Lindell kick)	Tie 24–24
Q4	10:22	BUF	Drayton Florence 27 yard interception return (Rian Lindell kick)	BUF 31–24
Q4	3:25	NE	Wes Welker 6 yard pass from Tom Brady (Stephen Gostkowski kick)	Tie 31–31
Q4	:00	BUF	Rian Lindell 28 yard field goal	BUF 34–31

With the stunning win, the Bills improved to 3-0.

==== Week 4 ====
Team	1	2	3	4	Total
Bills	0	17	0	3	20
• Bengals	3	0	10	10	23

- Date: October 2
- Location: Paul Brown Stadium, Cincinnati, Ohio
- Game start: 1:00 p.m. EST
- Game attendance: 41,142
- Game weather: 57 °F (14 °C), sunny
- Referee: Gene Steratore
- TV announcers (CBS): Andrew Catalon and Steve Tasker

Scoring summary
Q1	2:02	CIN	Mike Nugent 31 yard field goal	CIN 3–0
Q2	13:33	BUF	Rian Lindell 43 yard field goal	Tie 3–3
Q2	3:10	BUF	Bryan Scott 43 yard interception return (Rian Lindell kick)	BUF 10–3
Q2	:40	BUF	Fred Jackson 2 yard run (Rian Lindell kick)	BUF 17–3
Q3	11:23	CIN	Mike Nugent 21 yard field goal	BUF 17–6
Q3	5:26	CIN	Jermaine Gresham 17 yard pass from Andy Dalton (Mike Nugent kick)	BUF 17–13
Q4	11:22	BUF	Rian Lindell 23 yard field goal	BUF 20–13
Q4	4:09	CIN	Andy Dalton 3 yard run (Mike Nugent kick)	Tie 20–20
Q4	:00	CIN	Mike Nugent 43 yard field goal	CIN 23–20

With the loss, the Bills snapped their 10-game winning streak against the Bengals.

==== Week 5 ====
Team	1	2	3	4	Total
Eagles	0	7	7	10	24
• Bills	7	14	10	0	31

- Date: October 9
- Location: Ralph Wilson Stadium, Orchard Park, New York
- Game start: 1:00 p.m. EST
- Game attendance: 69,803
- Game weather: 74 °F (23 °C), sunny
- Referee: Walt Coleman
- TV announcers (Fox): Sam Rosen, Brian Billick, and Laura Okmin

Scoring summary
Q1	8:03	BUF	Fred Jackson 5 yard run (Rian Lindell kick)	BUF 7–0
Q2	12:42	PHI	Jeremy Maclin 2 yard pass from Michael Vick (Alex Henery kick)	Tie 7–7
Q2	9:17	BUF	David Nelson 6 yard pass from Ryan Fitzpatrick (Rian Lindell kick)	BUF 14–7
Q2	9:00	BUF	Nick Barnett 31 yard interception return (Rian Lindell kick)	BUF 21–7
Q3	9:11	BUF	Brad Smith 5 yard run (Rian Lindell kick)	BUF 28–7
Q3	7:17	PHI	LeSean McCoy 10 yard run (Alex Henery kick)	BUF 28–14
Q3	1:15	BUF	Rian Lindell 25 yard field goal	BUF 31–14
Q4	14:51	PHI	DeSean Jackson 31 yard pass from Michael Vick (Alex Henery kick)	BUF 31–21
Q4	9:29	PHI	Alex Henery 35 yard field goal	BUF 31–24

==== Week 6 ====
Team	1	2	3	4	Total
Bills	14	3	0	7	24
• Giants	7	10	7	3	27

- Date: October 16
- Location: MetLife Stadium, East Rutherford, New Jersey
- Game start: 1:00 p.m. EST
- Game attendance: 79,243
- Game weather: 65 °F (18 °C), sunny
- Referee: Clete Blakeman
- TV announcers (CBS): Jim Nantz and Phil Simms

Scoring summary
Q1	5:20	NYG	Ahmad Bradshaw 1 yard run (Lawrence Tynes kick)	NYG 7–0
Q1	5:06	BUF	Fred Jackson 80 yard run (Rian Lindell kick)	Tie 7–7
Q1	:24	BUF	Naaman Roosevelt 60 yard pass from Ryan Fitzpatrick (Rian Lindell kick)	BUF 14–7
Q2	9:51	NYG	Lawrence Tynes 26 yard field goal	BUF 14–10
Q2	2:58	NYG	Ahmad Bradshaw 1 yard run (Lawrence Tynes kick)	NYG 17–14
Q2	:39	BUF	Rian Lindell 49 yard field goal	Tie 17–17
Q3	6:53	NYG	Ahmad Bradshaw 1 yard run (Lawrence Tynes kick)	NYG 24–17
Q4	8:57	BUF	Stevie Johnson 9 yard pass from Ryan Fitzpatrick (Rian Lindell kick)	Tie 24–24
Q4	1:32	NYG	Lawrence Tynes 23 yard field goal	NYG 27–24

==== Week 8 ====
Team	1	2	3	4	Total
Redskins	0	0	0	0	0
• Bills	7	6	7	3	23

- Date: October 30
- Location: Rogers Centre, Toronto, Ontario
- Game start: 4:05 p.m. EST
- Game attendance: 51,579
- Game weather: Indoors (dome)
- Referee: Terry McAulay
- TV announcers (Fox): Thom Brennaman, Troy Aikman, and Pam Oliver

Scoring summary
Q1	5:11	BUF	Scott Chandler 20 yard pass from Ryan Fitzpatrick (Rian Lindell kick)	BUF 7–0
Q2	8:45	BUF	Rian Lindell 37 yard field goal	BUF 10–0
Q2	:00	BUF	Rian Lindell 44 yard field goal	BUF 13–0
Q3	10:56	BUF	Scott Chandler 15 yard pass from Ryan Fitzpatrick (Rian Lindell kick)	BUF 20–0
Q4	3:26	BUF	Rian Lindell 41 yard field goal	BUF 23–0

==== Week 9 ====
Team	1	2	3	4	Total
• Jets	0	3	17	7	27
Bills	0	0	0	11	11

- Date: November 6
- Location: Ralph Wilson Stadium, Orchard Park, New York
- Game start: 1:00 p.m. EST
- Game attendance: 70,133
- Game weather: 57 °F (14 °C), sunny
- Referee: Ed Hochuli
- TV announcers (CBS): Jim Nantz and Phil Simms

Scoring summary
Q2	2:55	NYJ	Nick Folk 49 yard field goal	NYJ 3–0
Q3	10:16	NYJ	Nick Folk 50 yard field goal	NYJ 6–0
Q3	8:34	NYJ	LaDainian Tomlinson 1 yard run (Nick Folk kick)	NYJ 13–0
Q3	4:47	BUF	Rian Lindell 24 yard field goal	NYJ 13–3
Q3	3:27	NYJ	Santonio Holmes 8 yard pass from Mark Sanchez (Nick Folk kick)	NYJ 20–3
Q4	6:27	NYJ	John Conner 1 yard run (Nick Folk kick)	NYJ 27–3
Q4	3:14	BUF	David Nelson 7 yard pass from Ryan Fitzpatrick (Ryan Fitzpatrick run)	NYJ 27–11

==== Week 10 ====
Team	1	2	3	4	Total
Bills	0	7	0	0	7
• Cowboys	14	14	6	10	44

- Date: November 13
- Location: Cowboys Stadium, Arlington, Texas
- Game start: 1:00 p.m. EST
- Game attendance: 85,157
- Game weather: Indoors (roof closed)
- Referee: Jerome Boger
- TV announcers (CBS): Jim Nantz and Phil Simms

Scoring summary
Q1	12:12	DAL	Dez Bryant 34 yard pass from Tony Romo (Dan Bailey kick)	DAL 7–0
Q1	3:05	DAL	Laurent Robinson 5 yard pass from Tony Romo (Dan Bailey kick)	DAL 14–0
Q2	12:17	DAL	Laurent Robinson 58 yard pass from Tony Romo (Dan Bailey kick)	DAL 21–0
Q2	8:16	BUF	David Nelson 3 yard pass from Ryan Fitzpatrick (Dave Rayner kick)	DAL 21–7
Q2	1:05	DAL	DeMarco Murray 1 yard run (Dan Bailey kick)	DAL 28–7
Q3	2:25	DAL	Dan Bailey 45 yard field goal	DAL 31–7
Q3	:16	DAL	Dan Bailey 36 yard field goal	DAL 34–7
Q4	5:11	DAL	Dan Bailey 31 yard field goal	DAL 37–7
Q4	4:54	DAL	Terrence Newman 43 yard interception return (Dan Bailey kick)	DAL 44–7

==== Week 11 ====
Team	1	2	3	4	Total
Bills	3	3	0	2	8
• Dolphins	14	14	7	0	35

- Date: November 20
- Location: Sun Life Stadium, Miami Gardens, Florida
- Game start: 1:00 p.m. EST
- Game attendance: 57,531
- Game weather: 80 °F (27 °C), sunny
- Referee: Walt Coleman
- TV announcers (CBS): Marv Albert and Rich Gannon

Scoring summary
Q1	10:13	BUF	Dave Rayner 30 yard field goal	BUF 3–0
Q1	3:28	MIA	Anthony Fasano 1 yard pass from Matt Moore (Shayne Graham kick)	MIA 7–3
Q1	:58	MIA	Reggie Bush 5 yard run (Shayne Graham kick)	MIA 14–3
Q2	12:45	MIA	Charles Clay 12 yard pass from Matt Moore (Shayne Graham kick)	MIA 21–3
Q2	1:36	MIA	Davone Bess 4 yard pass from Matt Moore (Shayne Graham kick)	MIA 28–3
Q3	10:08	MIA	Lex Hilliard recovered blocked punt in end zone (Shayne Graham kick)	MIA 35–3
Q4	13:25	BUF	Safety, Daniel Thomas tackled by Kelvin Sheppard in end zone	MIA 35–5

Trying to snap a two-game losing streak, the Bills flew to Sun Life Stadium for a Week 11 AFC East showdown with the Miami Dolphins. Buffalo delivered the game's opening punch in the first quarter with a 30-yard field goal from kicker Dave Rayner, but the Dolphins answered with quarterback Matt Moore completing a 1-yard touchdown pass to tight end Anthony Fasano, followed by running back Reggie Bush getting a 5-yard touchdown run. Miami added onto their lead in the second quarter with Moore completing a 12-yard touchdown pass to fullback Charles Clay and a 4-yard touchdown pass to wide receiver Davone Bess. The Bills would close out the half with a 56-yard field goal from Rayner.

The Dolphins added onto Buffalo's misery in the third quarter with running back Lex Hilliard recovering a blocked punt in the endzone for a touchdown. The Bills tried to rally in the fourth quarter as rookie linebacker Kelvin Sheppard tackled running back Daniel Thomas in the endzone for a safety, but Miami's lead proved to be too much to overcome.

With the loss, Buffalo fell to 5–5.

==== Week 12 ====
Team	1	2	3	4	Total
Bills	7	7	7	3	24
• Jets	0	14	7	7	28

- Date: November 27
- Location: MetLife Stadium, East Rutherford, New Jersey
- Game start: 1:00 p.m. EST
- Game attendance: 79,088
- Game weather: 60 °F (16 °C), partly cloudy
- Referee: Carl Cheffers
- TV announcers (CBS): Marv Albert and Rich Gannon

Scoring summary
Q1	1:38	BUF	David Nelson 8 yard pass from Ryan Fitzpatrick (Dave Rayner kick)	BUF 7–0
Q2	12:02	NYJ	Dustin Keller 3 yard pass from Mark Sanchez (Nick Folk kick)	Tie 7–7
Q2	2:06	BUF	Stevie Johnson 5 yard pass from Ryan Fitzpatrick (Rian Lindell kick)	BUF 14–7
Q2	1:03	NYJ	Plaxico Burress 14 yard pass from Mark Sanchez (Nick Folk kick)	Tie 14–14
Q3	3:50	NYJ	Dustin Keller 18 yard pass from Mark Sanchez (Nick Folk kick)	NYJ 21–14
Q3	2:11	BUF	Brad Smith 36 yard pass from Ryan Fitzpatrick (Dave Rayner kick)	Tie 21–21
Q4	9:46	BUF	Dave Rayner 53 yard field goal	BUF 24–21
Q4	1:01	NYJ	Santonio Holmes 16 yard pass from Mark Sanchez (Nick Folk kick)	NYJ 28–24

==== Week 13 ====
Team	1	2	3	4	Total
• Titans	10	7	3	3	23
Bills	7	3	0	7	17

- Date: December 4
- Location: Ralph Wilson Stadium, Orchard Park, New York
- Game start: 1:00 p.m. EST
- Game attendance: 56,463
- Game weather: 57 °F (14 °C), mostly cloudy
- Referee: Alberto Riveron
- TV announcers (CBS): Spero Dedes and Steve Beuerlein

Scoring summary
Q1	12:27	TEN	Rob Bironas 48 yard field goal	TEN 3–0
Q1	7:17	BUF	C. J. Spiller 35 yard field goal (Dave Rayner kick)	BUF 7–3
Q1	5:50	TEN	Chris Johnson 48 yard run (Rob Bironas kick)	TEN 10–7
Q2	13:48	TEN	Chris Johnson 4 yard run (Rob Bironas kick)	TEN 17–7
Q2	6:46	BUF	Dave Rayner 27 yard field goal	TEN 17–10
Q3	6:45	TEN	Rob Bironas 27 yard field goal	TEN 20–10
Q4	8:55	TEN	Rob Bironas 44 yard field goal	TEN 23–10
Q4	2:58	BUF	Stevie Johnson 2 yard pass from Ryan Fitzpatrick (Dave Rayner kick)	TEN 23–17

==== Week 14 ====
Team	1	2	3	4	Total
Bills	0	0	10	0	10
• Chargers	7	9	14	7	37

- Date: December 11
- Location: Qualcomm Stadium, San Diego, California
- Game start: 4:15 p.m. EST
- Game attendance: 62,494
- Game weather: 59 °F (15 °C), cloudy
- Referee: Gene Steratore
- TV announcers (CBS): Kevin Harlan and Solomon Wilcots

Scoring summary
Q1	7:52	SD	Antonio Gates 7 yard pass from Philip Rivers (Nick Novak kick)	SD 7–0
Q2	14:16	SD	Mike Tolbert 1 yard run (kick blocked)	SD 13–0
Q2	6:41	SD	Nick Novak 47 yard field goal	SD 16–0
Q3	11:43	BUF	Dave Rayner 37 yard field goal	SD 16–3
Q3	10:11	BUF	Bryan Scott recovered fumble in end zone (Dave Rayner kick)	SD 16–10
Q3	4:11	SD	Antonio Gates 2 yard pass from Philip Rivers (Nick Novak kick)	SD 23–10
Q3	4:02	SD	Steve Gregory 26 yard interception return (Nick Novak kick)	SD 30–10
Q4	9:01	SD	Patrick Crayton 26 yard pass from Philip Rivers (Nick Novak kick)	SD 37–10

==== Week 15 ====
Team	1	2	3	4	Total
• Dolphins	0	13	7	10	30
Bills	7	0	0	16	23

- Date: December 18
- Location: Ralph Wilson Stadium, Orchard Park, New York
- Game start: 1:00 p.m. EST
- Game attendance: 60,898
- Game weather: 31 °F (−1 °C), snow
- Referee: John Parry
- TV announcers (CBS): Kevin Harlan and Solomon Wilcots

Scoring summary
Q1	4:53	BUF	C. J. Spiller 24 yard run (Dave Rayner kick)	BUF 7–0
Q2	14:52	MIA	Anthony Fasano 22 yard pass from Matt Moore (Dan Carpenter kick)	Tie 7–7
Q2	8:34	MIA	Dan Carpenter 20 yard field goal	MIA 10–7
Q2	6:05	MIA	Dan Carpenter 26 yard field goal	MIA 13–7
Q3	12:06	MIA	Brandon Marshall 65 yard pass from Matt Moore (Dan Carpenter kick)	MIA 20–7
Q4	11:46	MIA	Dan Carpenter 26 yard field goal	MIA 23–7
Q4	5:54	BUF	C. J. Spiller 3 yard pass from Ryan Fitzpatrick (pass failed)	MIA 23–13
Q4	5:41	MIA	Reggie Bush 76 yard run (Dan Carpenter kick)	MIA 30–13
Q4	2:27	BUF	Derek Hagan 2 yard pass from Ryan Fitzpatrick (Dave Rayner kick)	MIA 30–20
Q4	1:22	BUF	Dave Rayner 34 yard field goal	MIA 30–23

==== Week 16 ====
Team	1	2	3	4	Total
Broncos	7	0	7	0	14
• Bills	0	17	6	17	40

- Date: December 24
- Location: Ralph Wilson Stadium, Orchard Park, New York
- Game start: 1:00 p.m. EST
- Game attendance: 45,112
- Game weather: 30 °F (−1 °C), sunny
- Referee: Walt Anderson
- TV announcers (CBS): Jim Nantz and Phil Simms

Scoring summary
Q1	7:13	DEN	Tim Tebow 1 yard run (Matt Prater kick)	DEN 7–0
Q2	6:06	BUF	Dave Rayner 28 yard field goal	DEN 7–3
Q2	4:05	BUF	Leodis McKelvin 80 yard punt return (Dave Rayner kick)	BUF 10–7
Q2	:19	BUF	C. J. Spiller 4 yard run (Dave Rayner kick)	BUF 17–7
Q3	11:42	DEN	Daniel Fells 17 yard pass from Tim Tebow (Matt Prater kick)	BUF 17–14
Q3	6:19	BUF	Dave Rayner 25 yard field goal	BUF 20–14
Q3	2:32	BUF	Dave Rayner 25 yard field goal	BUF 23–14
Q4	13:26	BUF	Dave Rayner 29 yard field goal	BUF 26–14
Q4	8:03	BUF	Jarius Byrd 37 yard interception return (Dave Rayner kick)	BUF 33–14
Q4	7:45	BUF	Spencer Johnson 17 yard fumble return (Dave Rayner kick)	BUF 40–14

==== Week 17 ====
Team	1	2	3	4	Total
Bills	21	0	0	0	21
• Patriots	0	14	14	21	49

- Date: January 1
- Location: Gillette Stadium, Foxborough, Massachusetts
- Game start: 1:00 p.m. EST
- Game attendance: 68,756
- Game weather: 51 °F (11 °C), sunny
- Referee: Bill Leavy
- TV announcers (CBS): Don Criqui and Randy Cross

Scoring summary
Q1	11:18	BUF	Tashard Choice 1 yard run (Brandon Coutu kick)	BUF 7–0
Q1	5:19	BUF	Stevie Johnson 18 yard pass from Ryan Fitzpatrick (Brandon Coutu kick)	BUF 14–0
Q1	:48	BUF	C. J. Spiller 15 yard pass from Ryan Fitzpatrick (Brandon Coutu kick)	BUF 21–0
Q2	11:58	NE	BenJarvus Green-Ellis 1 yard run (Stephen Gostkowski kick)	BUF 21–7
Q2	5:42	NE	Aaron Hernandez 39 yard pass from Tom Brady (Stephen Gostkowski kick)	BUF 21–14
Q3	12:19	NE	Stephen Gostkowski 47 yard field goal	BUF 21–17
Q3	5:13	NE	Stephen Gostkowski 20 yard field goal	BUF 21–20
Q3	1:32	NE	Rob Gronkowski 17 yard pass from Tom Brady (Danny Woodhead run)	NE 28–21
Q4	11:16	NE	BenJarvus Green-Ellis 3 yard run (Stephen Gostkowski kick)	NE 35–21
Q4	3:02	NE	Rob Gronkowski 7 yard pass from Tom Brady (Stephen Gostkowski kick)	NE 42–21
Q4	2:55	NE	Sterling Moore 21 yard interception return (Stephen Gostkowski kick)	NE 49–21

Buffalo's final game of the season was a 49–21 loss to New England on New Year's Day 2012. In a mirror image of Week Three, the Bills opened a 21–0 on New England, before giving up 49 unanswered points to the high-powered Patriot offense. Head coach Chan Gailey benched wide receiver Stevie Johnson after Johnson caught a touchdown, then lifted his jersey to reveal "Happy New Year" on his shirt. The touchdown was Johnson's final play of the season as he was benched for the rest of the game. According to Pro-Football-Reference.com, New England, who won by 28, became the first team in NFL history to win a game by more than eight points after trailing by more than 20 points after one quarter. It was also the first time in a two-game season series that the winning team in each game overcame a deficit of more than 17 points. With the loss, the Bills finished with a 6–10 record and secured the 10th pick in the 2012 NFL draft.

== Standings ==
AFC East
	W	L	T	PCT	DIV	CONF	PF	PA	STK
^{(1)} New England Patriots	13	3	0	.813	5–1	10–2	513	342	W8
New York Jets	8	8	0	.500	3–3	6–6	377	363	L3
Miami Dolphins	6	10	0	.375	3–3	5–7	329	313	W1
Buffalo Bills	6	10	0	.375	1–5	4–8	372	434	L1
