= 2010 Buffalo Bills season =

51st season in franchise history

- Owner: Ralph Wilson
- General manager: Buddy Nix
- Head coach: Chan Gailey
- Home stadium: Ralph Wilson Stadium; Rogers Centre (Week 9)

Results
- Record: 4–12
- Division place: 4th AFC East
- Playoffs: Did not qualify
- Pro Bowlers: DT Kyle Williams

The 2010 season was the Buffalo Bills' 51st season in the National Football League (NFL), It was Buffalo's first season with Buddy Nix in the role of general manager and head coach Chan Gailey. The Bills hoped to improve on their 6–10 record from the 2009 season, and attempt to make the playoffs for the first time since 1999. The Bills had the 9th pick in the first round of the 2010 NFL draft selecting C. J. Spiller, a running back from Clemson. This season marked the first 0–8 start since 1984, in which they finished 2–14. They were eliminated from playoff contention in Week 12, extending their playoff drought to 11 seasons. Despite the poor start, Buffalo became largely competitive after the bye in Week 9.

Their next four losses were by only three points each, all to teams that made the playoffs that year—Baltimore, Kansas City, Chicago and Pittsburgh (three of these losses went to overtime). The Bills eventually won four of their final eight games, which carried over into a strong start to the 2011 season. The 2010 season was marked by the emergence of wide receiver Stevie Johnson, who gained 1,073 receiving yards and nose tackle Kyle Williams, an All-Pro in 2010 who gained status as an elite defensive tackle.

== Offseason ==
The Bills had fired head coach Dick Jauron after Week 10 of the 2009 season; he had been replaced on an interim basis by defensive coordinator Perry Fewell. The remainder of the Jauron coaching staff was released at the end of the year, including Fewell. Former Dallas Cowboys and Georgia Tech head coach Chan Gailey was hired as the Bills' new head coach and Buddy Nix had taken over as general manager replacing Russ Brandon, who stayed on as CEO. Gailey installed the 3-4 defense (although the team would play in a 4–3 on certain downs) and the "Pistol" offensive formation. George Edwards was named defensive coordinator, and though Gailey stated he would call the offensive plays, Curtis Modkins was named the nominal offensive coordinator. On February 18, 2010, starting right tackle Brad Butler announced his retirement from professional football. Butler suffered a season ending (ultimately a career ending) knee injury vs. the Tampa Bay Buccaneers in week 2 of the 2009 season. The Bills held an open competition for the starting quarterback position between Trent Edwards, Ryan Fitzpatrick and Brian Brohm during training camp. Edwards was named starter prior to the first preseason game, but was released from the team after two poor performances. Fitzpatrick took over in Week 3 and, in 13 games, became the first Bills quarterback to throw for 3,000 passing yards in a season since J. P. Losman in 2006.

=== 2010 draft ===
2010 Buffalo Bills Draft Selections
| Round | Overall | Player | Position | College |
|---|---|---|---|---|
| 1 | 9 | C. J. Spiller | RB | Clemson |
| 2 | 41 | Torell Troup | DT | UCF |
| 3 | 72 | Alex Carrington | DE | Arkansas State |
| 4 | 107 | Marcus Easley | WR | Connecticut |
| 5 | 140 | Ed Wang | OT | Virginia Tech |
| 6 | 178 | Arthur Moats | DE | James Madison |
| 6 | 192 | Danny Batten | DE | South Dakota State |
| 7 | 209 | Levi Brown | QB | Troy |
| 7 | 216 | Kyle Calloway | OT | Iowa |

== In-season transactions ==
Come week three Fitzpatrick was named starter against the Patriots as Edwards was benched. In the game Fitzpatrick had surpassed Edwards' statistics for the first two games. This resulted in Edwards' release from the roster the following day on Monday, a day after the game, when his success in the preseason did not continue into the first two games of the regular season. He was picked up by the Jacksonville Jaguars off waivers the next day on Tuesday.

Similarly, Marshawn Lynch was one of the starting running backs at the beginning of the regular season. He was only to be traded to the Seattle Seahawks after four games into the regular season with the rise of running backs Fred Jackson and first-round draft pick C. J. Spiller created a logjam. The draft picks were at first undisclosed. It was later announced that the Bills would receive a fourth-round draft pick in the 2011 draft and a conditional pick in the 2012 draft.

== Staff ==
Buffalo Bills 2010 staff
| Front office: Owner/founder/president – Ralph Wilson; CEO – Russ Brandon; Executive vice president/general manager – Buddy Nix; Senior vice president of football administration – Jim Overdorf; Vice president of college scouting – Tom Modrak; Assistant general manager/director of pro personnel – Doug Whaley; Player Personnel Analyst – Kevin Meganck; Pro Personnel Coordinator – Rob Hanrahan; Head coaches: Head coach – Chan Gailey; Offensive coaches: Offensive coordinator/running backs – Curtis Modkins; Quarterbacks – George Cortez; Wide receivers – Stan Hixon; Tight ends – Bob Bicknell; Offensive line – Joe D'Alessandris; Assistant offensive line – Bobby Johnson; Offensive quality control – Kevin Patullo | Defensive coaches: Defensive coordinator – George Edwards; Defensive line – Giff Smith; Inside linebackers - DeMontie Cross; Outside linebackers – Bob Sanders; Defensive backs – George Catavolos; Defensive quality control – Adrian White; Special teams coaches: Special teams coordinator – Bruce DeHaven; Assistant special teams – Stan Kwan; Strength and conditioning: Head strength and conditioning – Eric Ciano; Head strength and conditioning – John Gamble |

== Final roster ==
2010 Buffalo Bills roster
| Quarterbacks (QB): 4 Brian Brohm; 10 Levi Brown; 14 Ryan Fitzpatrick; Running backs (RB): 30 Jehuu Caulcrick FB; 25 Quinton Ganther; 22 Fred Jackson; 38 Corey McIntyre FB; 21 C. J. Spiller; Wide receivers (WR): 17 Paul Hubbard; 13 Stevie Johnson; 19 Donald Jones; 86 David Nelson; 18 Naaman Roosevelt; Tight ends (TE): 82 Mike Caussin; 84 Scott Chandler; 80 David Martin; 88 Jonathan Stupar | Offensive linemen (OL): 77 Demetress Bell T; 74 Colin Brown T; 63 Geoff Hangartner C; 67 Andy Levitre G; 79 Erik Pears T; 76 Chad Rinehart G; 71 Ed Wang T; 70 Eric Wood G/C; 61 Mansfield Wrotto T; Defensive linemen (DL): 92 Alex Carrington DE; 72 Kellen Heard NT; 91 Spencer Johnson DE; 97 John McCargo DE; 99 Marcus Stroud DE; 96 Torell Troup DE; 95 Kyle Williams NT | Linebackers (LB): 50 Akin Ayodele ILB; 94 Mike Balogun ILB; 90 Chris Kelsay OLB; 58 Aaron Maybin OLB; 52 Arthur Moats OLB; 51 Paul Posluszny ILB; 49 Pierre Woods OLB; Defensive backs (DB): 31 Jairus Byrd FS; 27 Reggie Corner CB; 33 Jon Corto SS; 29 Drayton Florence CB; 24 Terrence McGee CB; 28 Leodis McKelvin CB; 43 Bryan Scott SS; 20 Donte Whitner SS; 37 George Wilson FS; 26 Ashton Youboty CB; Special teams (ST): 9 Rian Lindell K; 8 Brian Moorman P; 65 Garrison Sanborn LS | Practice squad: 62 Sean Allen C/G; 46 Brett Johnson S; 45 Jammie Kirlew LB; 75 Boo Robinson NT; 45 John Russell LB (IR); 66 Jason Watkins T; 16 Bobby Williams WR; 47 Trae Williams CB; 13 Rod Windsor WR; Reserve: 57 Danny Batten OLB (IR); 59 Antonio Coleman OLB (IR); 54 Andra Davis ILB (IR); 81 Marcus Easley WR (IR); 98 Dwan Edwards DE (IR); 56 Keith Ellison ILB (IR); 83 Lee Evans WR (IR); 68 Cordaro Howard G/T (IR); 15 Felton Huggins WR (IR); 55 Shawne Merriman OLB/DE (IR); 89 Shawn Nelson TE (NF-Ill.); 11 Roscoe Parrish WR (IR); 53 Reggie Torbor OLB (IR); 60 Kraig Urbik G (IR); Rookies in italics 53 active, 15 reserve, 8 practice squad |

== Schedule ==
=== Preseason ===
The Bills preseason schedule was announced on March 31, 2010. The second preseason game, against the Indianapolis Colts, was held at the Rogers Centre in Toronto as part of the Bills Toronto Series.

| Week | Date | Opponent | Result | Record | Venue | Recap |
|---|---|---|---|---|---|---|
| 1 | August 13 | at Washington Redskins | **L** 17–42 | 0–1 | FedExField | Recap |
| 2 | August 19 | Indianapolis Colts | **W** 34–21 | 1–1 | (Canada) Rogers Centre (Toronto) | Recap |
| 3 | August 28 | Cincinnati Bengals | **W** 35–20 | 2–1 | Ralph Wilson Stadium | Recap |
| 4 | September 2 | at Detroit Lions | **L** 23–28 | 2–2 | Ford Field | Recap |

=== Regular season ===
Football statistics site Football Outsiders calculated that the Bills had the toughest schedule in the league in 2010, based on strength of opponent, whilst Pro Football Reference argued that the 2010 Bills had the toughest schedule for any NFL team since 1971, with nine games against opponents 10–6 or better. Apart from their AFC East division games, the Bills played against the AFC North and NFC North according to the conference rotation, and played the Chiefs and Jaguars based on 2009 divisional positions.

Though the Bills were the last team to record their first win in 2010, starting the season with eight consecutive losses, they improved greatly in the second half of the season, with a record of 4–4 to finish the year. Nine of the Bills' twelve losses were to teams that qualified for the postseason, including both representatives in Super Bowl XLV – Pittsburgh and Green Bay. Six of the twelve losses were by eight points or less. Four Buffalo losses had a margin of three points or less and three losses were in overtime, all to eventual playoff teams (Week 7 at Baltimore, Week 8 at Kansas City and Week 12 vs. Pittsburgh).

| Week | Date | Opponent | Result | Record | Venue | Recap |
|---|---|---|---|---|---|---|
| 1 | September 12 | **Miami Dolphins** | **L** 10–15 | 0–1 | Ralph Wilson Stadium | Recap |
| 2 | September 19 | at Green Bay Packers | **L** 7–34 | 0–2 | Lambeau Field | Recap |
| 3 | September 26 | at **New England Patriots** | **L** 30–38 | 0–3 | Gillette Stadium | Recap |
| 4 | October 3 | **New York Jets** | **L** 14–38 | 0–4 | Ralph Wilson Stadium | Recap |
| 5 | October 10 | Jacksonville Jaguars | **L** 26–36 | 0–5 | Ralph Wilson Stadium | Recap |
| 6 | Bye | | | | | |
| 7 | October 24 | at Baltimore Ravens | **L** 34–37 (OT) | 0–6 | M&T Bank Stadium | Recap |
| 8 | October 31 | at Kansas City Chiefs | **L** 10–13 (OT) | 0–7 | Arrowhead Stadium | Recap |
| 9 | November 7 | Chicago Bears | **L** 19–22 | 0–8 | (Canada) Rogers Centre (Toronto) | Recap |
| 10 | November 14 | Detroit Lions | **W** 14–12 | 1–8 | Ralph Wilson Stadium | Recap |
| 11 | November 21 | at Cincinnati Bengals | **W** 49–31 | 2–8 | Paul Brown Stadium | Recap |
| 12 | November 28 | Pittsburgh Steelers | **L** 16–19 (OT) | 2–9 | Ralph Wilson Stadium | Recap |
| 13 | December 5 | at Minnesota Vikings | **L** 14–38 | 2–10 | Mall of America Field | Recap |
| 14 | December 12 | Cleveland Browns | **W** 13–6 | 3–10 | Ralph Wilson Stadium | Recap |
| 15 | December 19 | at **Miami Dolphins** | **W** 17–14 | 4–10 | Sun Life Stadium | Recap |
| 16 | December 26 | **New England Patriots** | **L** 3–34 | 4–11 | Ralph Wilson Stadium | Recap |
| 17 | January 2 | at **New York Jets** | **L** 7–38 | 4–12 | New Meadowlands Stadium | Recap |

Note: Intra-division opponents are in bold text.

== Standings ==
AFC East
| | W | L | T | PCT | DIV | CONF | PF | PA | STK |
|---|---|---|---|---|---|---|---|---|---|
| ^{(1)} New England Patriots | 14 | 2 | 0 | .875 | 5–1 | 10–2 | 518 | 313 | W8 |
| ^{(6)} New York Jets | 11 | 5 | 0 | .688 | 4–2 | 9–3 | 367 | 304 | W1 |
| Miami Dolphins | 7 | 9 | 0 | .438 | 2–4 | 5–7 | 273 | 333 | L3 |
| Buffalo Bills | 4 | 12 | 0 | .250 | 1–5 | 3–9 | 283 | 425 | L2 |

=== Conference ===
AFC
| # | Team | Division | W | L | T | PCT | DIV | CONF | SOS | SOV | STK |
|---|---|---|---|---|---|---|---|---|---|---|---|
Division winners
| 1 | New England Patriots | East | 14 | 2 | 0 | .875 | 5–1 | 10–2 | .504 | .504 | W8 |
| 2 (Note: Pittsburgh clinched the AFC North title instead of Baltimore based on division record (5–1 to Baltimore's 4–2).) | Pittsburgh Steelers | North | 12 | 4 | 0 | .750 | 5–1 | 9–3 | .500 | .417 | W2 |
| 3 (Note: Indianapolis clinched the AFC No. 3 seed instead of Kansas City based on a head-to-head victory.) | Indianapolis Colts | South | 10 | 6 | 0 | .625 | 4–2 | 8–4 | .473 | .425 | W4 |
| 4 | Kansas City Chiefs | West | 10 | 6 | 0 | .625 | 2–4 | 6–6 | .414 | .381 | L1 |
Wild cards
| 5 | Baltimore Ravens | North | 12 | 4 | 0 | .750 | 4–2 | 9–3 | .484 | .422 | W4 |
| 6 | New York Jets | East | 11 | 5 | 0 | .688 | 4–2 | 9–3 | .492 | .409 | W1 |
Did not qualify for the postseason
| 7 | San Diego Chargers | West | 9 | 7 | 0 | .563 | 3–3 | 7–5 | .457 | .410 | W1 |
| 8 (Note: Jacksonville finished ahead of Oakland based on head-to-head victory.) | Jacksonville Jaguars | South | 8 | 8 | 0 | .500 | 3–3 | 7–5 | .453 | .383 | L3 |
| 9 | Oakland Raiders | West | 8 | 8 | 0 | .500 | 6–0 | 6–6 | .469 | .469 | W1 |
| 10 | Miami Dolphins | East | 7 | 9 | 0 | .438 | 2–4 | 5–7 | .539 | .438 | L3 |
| 11 (Note: Houston finished ahead of Tennessee in the AFC South based on division record (3–3 to Tennessee's 2–4).) | Houston Texans | South | 6 | 10 | 0 | .375 | 3–3 | 5–7 | .523 | .500 | W1 |
| 12 | Tennessee Titans | South | 6 | 10 | 0 | .375 | 2–4 | 3–9 | .508 | .500 | L2 |
| 13 | Cleveland Browns | North | 5 | 11 | 0 | .313 | 1–5 | 3–9 | .570 | .475 | L4 |
| 14 (Note: Denver finished ahead of Buffalo and Cincinnati based on strength of victory.) | Denver Broncos | West | 4 | 12 | 0 | .250 | 1–5 | 3–9 | .516 | .453 | L1 |
| 15 (Note: Buffalo finished ahead of Cincinnati based on head-to-head victory.) | Buffalo Bills | East | 4 | 12 | 0 | .250 | 1–5 | 3–9 | .578 | .344 | L2 |
| 16 | Cincinnati Bengals | North | 4 | 12 | 0 | .250 | 2–4 | 3–9 | .582 | .438 | L1 |
Tiebreakers (Note: When breaking ties for three or more teams under the NFL's rules, they are first broken within divisions, then comparing only the highest ranked remaining team from each division.)

== Regular season results ==
=== Week 1: vs. Miami Dolphins ===
Week 1: Miami Dolphins at Buffalo Bills – Game summary

| Quarter | 1 | 2 | 3 | 4 | Total |
|---|---|---|---|---|---|
| Dolphins | 3 | 7 | 0 | 5 | 15 |
| Bills | 0 | 3 | 0 | 7 | 10 |

at Ralph Wilson Stadium, Orchard Park, New York

- Date: September 12
- Game time: 1:00 p.m. EDT
- Game weather: 62 °F (17 °C) (Cloudy)
- Game attendance: 69,295
- Referee: Clete Blakeman
- TV announcers (CBS): Gus Johnson and Steve Tasker
- http://www.nfl.com/gamecenter/2010091201/2010/REG1/dolphins@bills

Game information

First quarter

- MIA – Dan Carpenter 32 yard field goal, Dolphins 3–0, Drive: 10 plays, 45 yards, 5:54.

Second quarter

- MIA – Ronnie Brown 1 yard run (Dan Carpenter kick), Dolphins 10–0, Drive: 11 plays, 65 yards, 5:09.
- BUF – Rian Lindell 51 yard field goal, Dolphins 10–3, Drive: 8 plays, 27 yards, 4:04.

Third quarter

- No scoring play

Fourth quarter

- MIA – Dan Carpenter 32 yard field goal, Dolphins 13–3, Drive: 10 plays, 45 yards, 5:54.
- BUF – Roscoe Parrish 31 yard reception from Trent Edwards (Rian Lindell kick), Dolphins 13–10, Drive: 10 plays, 80 yards, 4:19
- MIA – Garrison Sanborn fumble out of bons for Safety, Dolphins 15–10

Top passers

- MIA – Chad Henne – 21/34, 182 yards
- BUF – Trent Edwards – 18/34, 139 yards, 1 TD

Top rushers

- MIA – Ronnie Brown – 13 rushes, 65 yards, 1 TD
- BUF – Fred Jackson – 4 rushes, 19 yards

Top receivers

- MIA – Brandon Marshall – 8 receptions, 53 yards
- BUF – Stevie Johnson – 3 receptions, 40 yards

Top tacklers

- MIA – Yeremiah Bell – 6 tackles, 2 assists
- BUF – Drayton Florence – 9 tackles, 1 assist

The Buffalo Bills began their season at home with an AFC East duel with the Miami Dolphins. In the 1st quarter, Buffalo trailed early when Dolphins kicker Dan Carpenter nailed a 32-yard field goal. The deficit was increased in the 2nd quarter when running back Ronnie Brown got a 1-yard TD run. The Bills eventually replied when kicker Rian Lindell made a 51-yard field goal.

In the 4th quarter, Miami increased their lead with Carpenter hitting a 43-yard field goal. Buffalo replied with a touchdown pass from quarterback Trent Edwards making a 31-yard touchdown pass to wide receiver Roscoe Parrish. The final score was made when long snapper Garrison Sanborn snapped the ball to Brian Moorman out of bounds for a safety, giving the Dolphins 2 more points and the Bills a loss.

With the loss, the Bills began at 0–1.

=== Week 2: at Green Bay Packers ===
Week 2: Buffalo Bills at Green Bay Packers – Game summary

| Quarter | 1 | 2 | 3 | 4 | Total |
|---|---|---|---|---|---|
| Bills | 0 | 7 | 0 | 0 | 7 |
| Packers | 13 | 0 | 14 | 7 | 34 |

at Lambeau Field, Green Bay, Wisconsin

- Date: September 19
- Game time: 1:00 p.m. EDT/12:00 p.m. CDT
- Game weather: 58 °F (14 °C) (Wind)
- Game attendance: 70,741
- Referee: Ron Winter
- TV announcers (CBS): Spero Dedes and Randy Cross
- http://www.nfl.com/gamecenter/2010091901/2010/REG2/bills@packers

Game information

First quarter

- GB – Mason Crosby 44 yard field goal, Packers 3–0, Drive: 8 plays, 40 yards, 3:11.
- GB – Mason Crosby 24 yard field goal, Packers 6–0, Drive: 6 plays, 43 yards, 1:58.
- GB – Brandon Jackson 1 yard run (Mason Crosby kick), Packers 13–0, Drive: 11 plays, 72 yards, 5:51.

Second quarter

- BUF – Fred Jackson 3 yard run (Rian Lindell kick), Packers 13–7, Drive: 8 plays, 80 yards, 4:22.

Third quarter

- GB – Donald Driver 7 yard pass from Aaron Rodgers, Packers 20–7, Drive: 7 plays, 39 yards, 4:17.
- GB – Aaron Rodgers 9 yard run (Mason Crosby kick), Packers 27–7, Drive: 7 plays, 64 yards, 4:24.

Fourth quarter

- GB – James Jones 30 yard pass from Aaron Rodgers (Mason Crosby kick), Packers 34–7, Drive: 5 plays, 52 yards, 2:32.

Top passers

- BUF – Trent Edwards – 11/18, 102 yards, 2 interceptions
- GB – Aaron Rodgers – 19/29, 255 yards, 2 touchdowns

Top rushers

- BUF – Marshawn Lynch – 17 rushes, 64 yards
- GB – John Kuhn – 9 rushes, 36 yards

Top receivers

- BUF – Roscoe Parrish – 2 receptions, 234 yards
- GB – Jermichael Finley – 4 receptions, 103 yards

Top tacklers

- BUF – Chris Kelsay – 7 tackles, 1 assist
- GB – Nick Barnett – 7 tackles, 2 assists

Hoping to rebound from their loss to the Dolphins, the Bills flew to Lambeau Field for an interconference duel with the Packers. In the 1st quarter Buffalo trailed early as kicker Mason Crosby made a 44 and a 24-yard field goal, followed by RB Brandon Jackson getting a 1-yard TD run. The Bills made their only score of the game in the 2nd quarter when RB Fred Jackson made a 3-yard TD run. In the third quarter the Bills struggled further when QB Aaron Rodgers completed a 7-yard TD pass to WR Donald Driver, followed by Rodgers scrambling 9 yards to the endzone for a touchdown. The Packers increased their lead in the fourth when Rodgers made a 30-yard touchdown pass to WR James Jones.

With the loss, Buffalo fell to 0–2.

=== Week 3: at New England Patriots ===
Week 3: Buffalo Bills at New England Patriots – Game summary

| Quarter | 1 | 2 | 3 | 4 | Total |
|---|---|---|---|---|---|
| Bills | 3 | 13 | 7 | 7 | 30 |
| Patriots | 7 | 10 | 14 | 7 | 38 |

at Gillette Stadium, Foxborough, Massachusetts

- Date: September 26
- Game time: 1:00 p.m. EDT
- Game weather: 68 °F (20 °C) (Partly Cloudy)
- Game attendance: 68,756
- Referee: John Parry
- TV announcers (CBS): Kevin Harlan and Solomon Wilcots
- http://www.nfl.com/gamecenter/2010092603/2010/REG3/bills@patriots

Game information

First quarter

- BUF – Rian Lindell 39 yard field goal, Bills 3–0, Drive: 10 plays, 59 yards, 5:12.
- NE – Randy Moss 7 yard reception from Tom Brady, Patriots 7–3, Drive: 8 plays, 75 yards, 4:34.

Second quarter

- BUF – Rian Lindell 39 yard field goal, Patriots 7–6, Drive: 7 plays, 19 yards, 4:01.
- BUF – C. J. Spiller 5 yard pass from Ryan Fitzpatrick (Rian Lindell kick), Bills 13–7, Drive: 7 plays, 37 yards, 3:23.
- NE – Danny Woodhead 22 yard run (Stephen Gostkowski kick), Patriots 14–13, Drive: 6 plays, 76 yards, 3:15.
- BUF – Rian Lindell 34 yard field goal, Bills 16–14, Drive: 9 plays, 55 yards, 2:34.
- NE – Stephen Gostkowski 43 yard field goal, Patriots 17–16, Drive: 3 plays, 42 yards, 0:24.

Third quarter

- NE – Randy Moss 35 yard reception from Tom Brady (Stephen Gostkowski kick), Patriots 24–16, Drive: 5 plays, 74 yards, 1:49.
- BUF – C. J. Spiller 95 yard kickoff return (Rian Lindell kick), Patriots 24–23, Drive: 0 plays, 0 yards, 0:13.
- NE – Rob Gronkowski 5 yard reception from Tom Brady (Stephen Gostkowski kick), Patriots 31–23, Drive: 13 plays, 59 yards, 7:21.

Fourth quarter

- NE – BenJarvus Green-Ellis 7 yard run (Stephen Gostkowski kick), Patriots 38–23, Drive: 13 plays, 75 yards, 6:26.
- BUF – Stevie Johnson 37 yard reception from Ryan Fitzpatrick (Rian Lindell kick), Patriots 38–30, Drive: 7 plays, 80 yards, 4:11.

Top passers

- BUF – Ryan Fitzpatrick – 20/28, 247 yards, 2 touchdowns, 2 interceptions
- NE – Tom Brady – 21/27, 252 yards, 3 touchdowns

Top rushers

- BUF – Marshawn Lynch – 13 rushes, 79 yards
- NE – BenJarvus Green-Ellis – 16 rushes, 98 yards, 1 touchdown

Top receivers

- BUF – Roscoe Parrish – 5 receptions, 83 yards
- NE – Aaron Hernandez – 6 receptions, 65 yards

Top tacklers

- BUF – Donte Whitner – 7 tackles, 3 assist
- NE – Pat Chung – 7 tackles

Still looking for a win the Bills flew to Gillette Stadium for an AFC East rivalry match against the Patriots. In the first quarter Buffalo took the early lead when kicker Rian Lindell nailed a 39-yard field goal. Then they fell behind when QB Tom Brady made a 7-yard TD pass to WR Randy Moss. The Bills replied in the second quarter with Lindell making another 39-yard field goal, which was followed by QB Ryan Fitzpatrick getting a 5-yard TD pass to RB C. J. Spiller. The Patriots replied and took the narrow lead when Danny Woodhead made a 22-yard TD run. The Bills got the lead back when Lindell made a 34-yard field goal, which didn't last very long after kicker Stephen Gostkowski kicked a 43-yard field goal. The Bills fell further behind in the third quarter when Brady found Moss again on a 35-yard TD pass, but straight after the PAT, Buffalo scored when C. J. Spiller returned a kickoff and ran 95 yards to the endzone for a touchdown. The Patriots increased their narrow lead when Brady made a 5-yard TD pass to TE Rob Gronkowski, followed in the fourth quarter by RB BenJarvis Green-Ellis getting a 7-yard TD run. The Bills tried to come back into the game when Fitzpatrick made a 37-yard touchdown pass to WR Stevie Johnson, but the Patriots defense prevented anything else from happening, giving the Bills a loss and their 14th straight vs. the Patriots.

With the loss, Buffalo fell to 0–3. The next day Trent Edwards was released. He was picked up by the Jacksonville Jaguars off wavers the next day.

=== Week 4: vs. New York Jets ===
Week 4: New York Jets at Buffalo Bills – Game summary

| Quarter | 1 | 2 | 3 | 4 | Total |
|---|---|---|---|---|---|
| Jets | 7 | 10 | 21 | 0 | 38 |
| Bills | 0 | 7 | 0 | 7 | 14 |

at Ralph Wilson Stadium, Orchard Park, New York

- Date: October 3
- Game time: 1:00 p.m. EDT
- Game weather: 51 °F (11 °C) (Showers)
- Game attendance: 69,262
- Referee: Bill Leavy
- TV announcers (CBS): Greg Gumbel and Dan Dierdorf
- http://www.nfl.com/gamecenter/2010100300/2010/REG4/jets@bills

Game information

First quarter

- NYJ – LaDainian Tomlinson 1 yard run (Nick Folk kick), Jets 7–0, Drive: 9 plays, 63 yards, 4:18.

Second quarter

- NYJ – Nick Folk 19 yard field goal, Jets 10–0, Drive: 18 plays, 87 yards, 9:21.
- NYJ – Braylon Edwards 41 yard pass from Mark Sanchez (Nick Folk kick), Jets 17–0, Drive: 3 plays, 66 yards, 1:29.
- BUF – David Martin 4 yard pass from Ryan Fitzpatrick (Rian Lindell kick), Jets 17–7, Drive: 7 plays, 64 yards, 1:59.

Third quarter

- NYJ – Dustin Keller 3 yard pass from Brad Smith (Nick Folk kick), Jets 24–7, Drive: 10 plays, 69 yards, 5:22.
- NYJ – Dustin Keller 2 yard pass from Mark Sanchez (Nick Folk kick), Jets 31–7, Drive: 3 plays, 23 yards, 1:20.
- NYJ – LaDainian Tomlinson 26 yard run (Nick Folk kick), Jets 38–7, Drive: 2 plays, 35 yards, 0:44.

Fourth quarter

- BUF – Stevie Johnson 13 yard pass from Ryan Fitzpatrick (Rian Lindell kick), Jets 38–14, Drive: 5 plays, 79 yards, 2:23.

Top passers

- NYJ – Mark Sanchez – 14/24, 161 yards, 2 touchdowns
- BUF – Ryan Fitzpatrick – 12/27, 128 yards, 2 touchdowns

Top rushers

- NYJ – LaDainian Tomlinson – 19 rushes, 133 yards, 2 touchdowns
- BUF – Ryan Fitzpatrick – 7 rushes, 74 yards

Top receivers

- NYJ – Braylon Edwards – 4 receptions, 86 yards, 1 touchdown
- BUF – David Nelson – 4 receptions, 75 yards,

Top tacklers

- NYJ – David Harris – 4 tackles, 2 assists
- BUF – Donte Whitner – 9 tackles, 4 assists

Still looking for their first win of the season, the Bills went home, donned their throwback uniforms, and played a Week 4 AFC East duel with the New York Jets. Buffalo would trail early in the first quarter as Jets running back LaDainian Tomlinson got a 1-yard touchdown run. New York would add onto their lead in the second quarter as kicker Nick Folk nailed a 19-yard field goal, followed by quarterback Mark Sanchez completing a 41-yard touchdown pass to wide receiver Braylon Edwards. Buffalo would close out the half as quarterback Ryan Fitzpatrick connected with tight end David Martin on a 4-yard touchdown pass.

In the third quarter, the Jets would greatly extend their lead with tight end Dustin Keller catching a 3-yard touchdown pass from wide receiver/quarterback Brad Smith, followed by his 2-yard touchdown reception from Sanchez. Afterwards, Tomlinson would help secure the win for New York with his 26-yard touchdown run. The Bills would close out the game in the fourth quarter as Fitzpatrick completed a 13-yard touchdown pass to wide receiver Stevie Johnson.

With the loss, Buffalo fell to 0–4. Two days later, Marshawn Lynch was traded to the Seattle Seahawks in exchange for a fourth-round draft pick in the 2011 draft and a conditional pick in the 2012 draft, and tackle Jamon Meredith was waived.

=== Week 5: vs. Jacksonville Jaguars ===
Week 5: Jacksonville Jaguars at Buffalo Bills – Game summary

| Quarter | 1 | 2 | 3 | 4 | Total |
|---|---|---|---|---|---|
| Jaguars | 3 | 10 | 14 | 9 | 36 |
| Bills | 10 | 3 | 7 | 6 | 26 |

at Ralph Wilson Stadium, Orchard Park, New York

- Date: October 10
- Game time: 1:00 p.m. EDT
- Game weather: 62 °F (17 °C) (Sunny)
- Game attendance: 58,304
- Referee: Carl Cheffers
- TV announcers (CBS (blacked out locally)): Gus Johnson and Steve Tasker (blacked out locally)
- http://www.nfl.com/gamecenter/2010101000/2010/REG5/jaguars@bills/

Game information

First quarter

- BUF – Lee Evans 45 yard pass from Ryan Fitzpatrick (Rian Lindell kick), Bills 7–0, Drive: 1 plays, 45 yards, 0:08.
- BUF – Rian Lindell 29 yard field goal, Bills 10–0, Drive: 5 plays, 19 yards, 2:31.
- JAC – Josh Scobee 49 yard field goal, Bills 10–3, Drive: 6 plays, 27 yards, 3:09.

Second quarter

- BUF – Rian Lindell 22 yard field goal, Bills 13–7, Drive: 15 plays, 70 yards, 8:50.
- JAC – Josh Scobee 49 yard field goal, Bills 13–6, Drive: 12 plays, 44 yards, 6:16.
- JAC – Marcedes Lewis 1 yard pass from David Garrard (Josh Scobee kick), Jaguars 13–13, Drive: 10 plays, 85 yards, 4:11.

Third quarter

- JAC – Marcedes Lewis 27 yard pass from David Garrard (Josh Scobee kick), Jaguars 20–13, Drive: 3 plays, 39 yards, 1:38.
- BUF – Stevie Johnson 5 yard pass from Ryan Fitzpatrick (Rian Lindell kick), Jaguars 20–20, Drive: 6 plays, 45 yards, 2:01.
- JAC – Mike Sims-Walker 7 yard pass from David Garrard (Josh Scobee kick), Jaguars 27–20, Drive: 9 plays, 53 yards, 5:28.

Fourth quarter

- JAC – Josh Scobee 34 yard field goal, Jaguars 30–20, Drive: 6 plays, 37 yards, 3:03.
- JAC – Josh Scobee 40 yard field goal, Jaguars 33–20, Drive: 6 plays, 21 yards, 3:40.
- JAC – Josh Scobee 46 yard field goal, Jaguars 36–20, Drive: 5 plays, 24 yards, 1:47.
- BUF – Steve Johson 7 yard pass from Ryan Fitzpatrick (pass failed), Jaguars 36–27, Drive: 5 plays, 74 yards, 1:06.

Top passers

- JAC – David Garrard – 16/20, 178 yards, 3 touchdowns, 1 interception
- BUF – Ryan Fitzpatrick – 20/30, 220 yards, 3 touchdowns

Top rushers

- JAC – Maurice Jones-Drew – 19 rushes, 84 yards
- BUF – Fred Jackson – 12 rushes, 73 yards

Top receivers

- JAC – Marcedes Lewis – 4 receptions, 54 yards, 2 touchdowns
- BUF – Lee Evans – 5 receptions, 87 yards, 1 touchdown

Top tacklers

- JAC – Derek Cox – 6 tackles
- BUF – Donte Whitner – 10 tackles, 1 assist

Still looking for a win the Bills played on home ground for an AFC duel with the Jaguars. In the first quarter the Bills took the lead as QB Ryan Fitzpatrick made a 45-yard TD pass to WR Lee Evans; followed by kicker Rian Lindell making a 29-yard field goal. The Jaguars replied with kicker Josh Scobee nailing a 49-yard field goal, but in the second quarter the lead had expanded again with Lindell's 22-yard field goal. After that, the Jaguars rallied with Scobee getting another 49-yard field goal, then QB David Garrard made a 1-yard TD pass to TE Marcedes Lewis; followed in the third quarter by Garrard again finding Lewis on a 27-yard TD pass. Buffalo re-tied the game with Fitzpatrick completing a 5-yard TD pass to WR Stevie Johnson, but the Jaguars pulled away with Garrard making a 7-yard TD pass to WR Mike Sims-Walker, followed in the fourth quarter by Scobee making a 34, 40 and a 46-yard field goal. Buffalo tried to tie the game with Fitzpatrick making a 7-yard TD pass to Johnson, but with a failed 2-point conversion, it became a 2-possession game which in turn became very difficult for Buffalo to recover.

With the loss, Buffalo entered their bye week with their first 0–5 start since 1985.

=== Week 7: at Baltimore Ravens ===
Week 7: Buffalo Bills at Baltimore Ravens – Game summary

| Quarter | 1 | 2 | 3 | 4 | OT | Total |
|---|---|---|---|---|---|---|
| Bills | 10 | 14 | 0 | 10 | 0 | 34 |
| Ravens | 3 | 17 | 14 | 0 | 3 | 37 |

at M&T Bank Stadium, Baltimore, Maryland

- Date: October 24
- Game time: 1:00 p.m. EDT
- Game weather: 70 °F (21 °C) (Partly Sunny)
- Game attendance: 71,220
- Referee: Pete Morelli
- TV announcers (CBS): Don Criqui and Steve Beuerlein
- http://www.nfl.com/gamecenter/2010102402/2010/REG7/bills@ravens

Game information

First quarter

- BAL – Billy Cundiff 41 yard field goal, Ravens 3–0, Drive: 7 plays, 45 yards, 2:27.
- BUF – Lee Evans 33 yard pass from Ryan Fitzpatrick (Rian Lindell kick), Bills 7–3, Drive: 6 plays, 72 yards, 3:15.
- BUF – Rian Lindell 21 yard field goal, Bills 10–3, Drive: 7 plays, 12 yards, 2:59.

Second quarter

- BUF – Stevie Johnson 33 yard pass from Ryan Fitzpatrick (Rian Lindell kick), Bills 17–3, Drive: 11 plays, 91 yards, 4:55.
- BAL – Todd Heap 26 yard pass from Joe Flacco (Billy Cundiff kick), Bills 17–10, Drive: 4 plays, 80 yards, 1:31.
- BUF – Lee Evans 20 yard pass from Ryan Fitzpatrick (Rian Lindell kick), Bills 24–10, Drive: 6 plays, 82 yards, 3:19.
- BAL – Billy Cundiff 48 yard field goal, Bills 24–13, Drive: 11 plays, 50 yards, 4:08.
- BAL – Todd Heap 14 yard pass from Joe Flacco (Billy Cundiff kick), Bills 24–20, Drive: 4 plays, 27 yards, 0:25.

Third quarter

- BAL – Anquan Boldin 34 yard pass from Joe Flacco (Billy Cundiff kick), Ravens 27–24, Drive: 1 plays, 34 yards, 0:07.
- BAL – Willis McGahee 2 yard run (Billy Cundiff kick), Ravens 34–24, Drive: 12 plays, 65 yards, 6:25.

Fourth quarter

- BUF – Lee Evans 17 yard pass from Ryan Fitzpatrick (Rian Lindell kick), Ravens 34–31, Drive: 5 plays, 63 yards, 2:42.
- BUF – Rian Lindell 50 yard field goal, Tied 34–34, Drive: 12 plays, 59 yards, 3:22.

Overtime

- BAL – Billy Cundiff 38 yard field goal, Ravens 37–34, Drive: 4 plays, 9 yards, 1:58.

Top passers

- BUF – Ryan Fitzpatrick – 29/43, 382 yards, 4 touchdowns, 2 interceptions
- BAL – Joe Flacco – 16/31, 250 yards, 3 touchdowns

Top rushers

- BUF – Fred Jackson – 23 rushes, 73 yards
- BAL – Ray Rice – 16 rushes, 72 yards

Top receivers

- BUF – Stevie Johnson – 8 receptions, 158 yards, 1 touchdown
- BAL – Anquan Boldin – 6 receptions, 92 yards, 1 touchdown

Top tacklers

- BUF – Donte Whitner – 7 tackles, 1 assist
- BAL – Ray Lewis – 14 tackles, 1 assist, 1 sack, 1 forced fumble

Still looking for a win the Bills flew to M&T Bank Stadium for an AFC duel against the Ravens. In the 1st quarter the Bills trailed early as kicker Billy Cundiff made a 41-yard field goal. But they pulled ahead with QB Ryan Fitzpatrick completing a 33-yard TD pass to WR Lee Evans, followed by kicker Rian Lindell hitting a 21-yard field goal. The lead was increased in the second quarter with Fitzpatrick finding WR Stevie Johnson on a 33-yard TD pass. The Ravens replied with QB Joe Flacco making a 26-yard TD pass to TE Todd Heap. Then Fitzpatrick found Evans again on a 20-yard TD pass to put the Bills up 24–10. The lead was narrowed when Cundiff hit a 48-yard field goal, followed by Flacco throwing a 14-yard TD pass to Heap. In the third quarter the Bills fell behind with Flacco completing a 34-yard TD pass to WR Anquan Boldin, followed by RB Willis McGahee getting a 2-yard TD run. The Bills managed to tie the game in the 4th quarter with Fitzpatrick making a 17-yard TD pass to Evans, and with Lindell getting a 50-yard field goal. After overtime, the decision was made when Cundiff successfully put away a 38-yard field goal to keep the Bills winless after 6 games.

With the loss, the Bills fell to 0–6. After a win by the Carolina Panthers the same week, the Bills became the only team still in contention for an imperfect season.

=== Week 8: at Kansas City Chiefs ===
Week 8: Buffalo Bills at Kansas City Chiefs – Game summary

| Quarter | 1 | 2 | 3 | 4 | OT | Total |
|---|---|---|---|---|---|---|
| Bills | 0 | 0 | 0 | 10 | 0 | 10 |
| Chiefs | 0 | 7 | 0 | 3 | 3 | 13 |

at Arrowhead Stadium, Kansas City, Missouri

- Date: October 31
- Game time: 1:00 p.m. EDT/12:00 p.m. CDT
- Game weather: 51 °F (11 °C) (Partly Sunny)
- Game attendance: 66,625
- Referee: Alberto Riveron
- TV announcers (CBS): Gus Johnson and Steve Tasker
- http://www.nfl.com/gamecenter/2010103103/2010/REG8/bills@chiefs

Game information

First quarter

Second quarter

- KC – Dwayne Bowe 1 yard pass from Matt Cassel (Ryan Succop kick), Chiefs 7–0, Drive: 6 plays, 71 yards, 2:26.

Third quarter

- BUF – Rian Lindell 43 yard field goal, Chiefs 7–3, Drive: 15 plays, 56 yards, 8:57.

Fourth quarter

- KC – Ryan Succop 28 yard field goal, Chiefs 10–3, Drive: 12 plays, 59 yards, 7:02.
- BUF – Stevie Johnson 4 yard pass from Ryan Fitzpatrick (Rian Lindell kick), Tied 10–10, Drive: 15 plays, 83 yards, 7:18.

Overtime

- KC – Ryan Succop 35 yard field goal, Chiefs 13–10, Drive: 8 plays, 53 yards, 1:13.

Top passers

- BUF – Ryan Fitzpatrick – 24/48, 223 yards, 1 touchdown, 1 interception
- KC – Matt Cassel – 14/26, 152 yards, 1 touchdown

Top rushers

- BUF – Fred Jackson – 20 rushes, 64 yards,
- KC – Jamaal Charles – 22 rushes, 177 yards

Top receivers

- BUF – Roscoe Parrish – 4 receptions, 66 yards
- KC – Jamaal Charles – 4 receptions, 61 yards

Top tacklers

- BUF – Paul Posluszny – 11 tackles, 6 assists
- KC – Eric Berry – 7 tackles, 3 assists, 1 interception

Still looking for a win the Bills flew to Arrowhead Stadium for an AFC duel with the Chiefs. In the First quarter the Bills trailed early as QB Matt Cassel got a 1-yard TD pass to WR Dwayne Bowe. The Bills narrowed the lead in the third quarter with kicker Rian Lindell making a 43-yard field goal. The Chiefs scored with kicker Ryan Succop getting a 28-yard field goal. The Bills responded and tied the game with Ryan Fitzpatrick throwing a 4-yard TD pass to WR Stevie Johnson. At overtime, Succop missed a 38-yarder with 3:38 in the OT. Rian Lindell then kicked a 53-yard field goal, which supposedly would've given the Bills the win, but KC called a timeout. Lindell's second kick hit the right upright and bounced off. The decision was made with Succop successfully hitting a 35-yard field goal with 3 seconds left on the clock to keep the Bills winless after 7 games. And their first 0–7 start since 1984.

Starting offensive tackle Cornell Green was placed on injured reserve to clear a roster spot for linebacker Shawne Merriman, who the Bills picked up on waivers from the San Diego Chargers on November 3.

=== Week 9: vs. Chicago Bears (Bills Toronto Series) ===
Week 9: Chicago Bears at Buffalo Bills – Game summary

| Quarter | 1 | 2 | 3 | 4 | Total |
|---|---|---|---|---|---|
| Bears | 0 | 7 | 7 | 8 | 22 |
| Bills | 0 | 7 | 6 | 6 | 19 |

at Rogers Centre, Toronto, Ontario, Canada

- Date: November 7
- Game time: 1:00 p.m. EST
- Game weather: None (Dome Closed)
- Game attendance: 50,746
- Referee: Gene Steratore
- TV announcers (Fox): Sam Rosen & Tim Ryan
- http://www.nfl.com/gamecenter/2010110704/2010/REG9/bears@bills

Game information

First quarter

Second quarter

- CHI – Greg Olsen 4 yard pass from Jay Cutler (Robbie Gould kick), Bears 7–0, Drive: 14 plays, 81 yards, 8:03.
- BUF – Roscoe Parrish 14 yard pass from Ryan Fitzpatrick (Rian Lindell kick), Tied 7–7, Drive: 11 plays, 68 yards, 1:32.

Third quarter

- CHI – Chester Taylor 1 yard run (Robbie Gould kick), Bears 14–7, Drive: 9 plays, 60 yards, 4:54.
- BUF – Fred Jackson 4 yard run (kick bloecked), Bears 14–13, Drive: 8 plays, 80 yards, 3:19.

Fourth quarter

- BUF – Corey McIntyre 1 yard run (run failed), Bills 19–14, Drive: 8 plays, 51 yards, 4:21.
- CHI – Earl Bennett 2 yard pass from Jay Cutler (Jay Cutler – Matt Forte pass), Bears 22–19, Drive: 6 plays, 23 yards, 2:22.

Top passers

- CHI – Jay Cutler – 17/30, 188 yards, 2 touchdowns
- BUF – Ryan Fitzpatrick – 31/51, 299 yards, 1 touchdown, 2 interceptions

Top rushers

- CHI – Matt Forte – 14 rushes, 49 yards
- BUF – C. J. Spiller – 7 rushes, 20 yards

Top receivers

- CHI – Earl Bennett – 4 receptions, 52 yards, 1 touchdown
- BUF – Stevie Johnson – 11 receptions, 145 yards

Top tacklers

- CHI – Lance Briggs – 7 tackles, 1 forced fumble
- BUF – Donte Whitner – 7 tackles, 1 assist

Still searching for their first win of the season, the Bills flew to the Rogers Centre for their Week 9 interconference duel with the Chicago Bears. After a scoreless first quarter, Buffalo trailed in the second quarter as Bears quarterback Jay Cutler completed a 4-yard touchdown pass to tight end Greg Olsen. The Bills answered with quarterback Ryan Fitzpatrick hooked up with wide receiver Roscoe Parrish on a 14-yard touchdown pass.

Chicago retook the lead as running back Chester Taylor got a 1-yard touchdown run. The Bills responded with a 4-yard touchdown run from running back Fred Jackson (with a blocked extra point). Buffalo took the lead in the fourth quarter with a 1-yard touchdown run from fullback Corey McIntyre (with a failed two-point conversion), but the Bears got the last laugh with Cutler completing a 2-yard touchdown pass to wide receiver Earl Bennett, along with a two-point conversion pass to running back Matt Forté.

With the loss, the Bills fell to their first 0–8 start since 1984. And became the first team to start out a season 0–8 since the Bengals and Lions in 2008.

=== Week 10: vs. Detroit Lions ===
Week 10: Detroit Lions at Buffalo Bills – Game summary

| Quarter | 1 | 2 | 3 | 4 | Total |
|---|---|---|---|---|---|
| Lions | 0 | 3 | 0 | 9 | 12 |
| Bills | 0 | 7 | 7 | 0 | 14 |

at Ralph Wilson Stadium, Orchard Park, New York

- Date: November 14
- Game time: 1:00 p.m. EST
- Game weather: 52 °F (11 °C) (Mostly Cloudy/Rain)
- Game attendance: 56,721
- Referee: Walt Coleman
- TV announcers (Fox): Ron Pitts, John Lynch and Charissa Thompson (blacked out locally)
- http://www.nfl.com/gamecenter/2010111406/2010/REG10/lions@bills

Game information

First quarter

Second quarter

- BUF – Fred Jackson 1 yard run (Rian Lindell kick), Bills 7–0, Drive: 5 plays, 57 yards, 2:07.
- DET – Dave Rayner 25 yard field goal, Billts 7–3, Drive: 7 plays, 23 yards, 0:39.

Third quarter

- BUF – Fred Jackson 16 yard pass from Ryan Fitzpatrick (Rian Lindel kick), Bills 14–3, Drive: 6 plays, 73 yards, 3:34.

Fourth quarter

- DET – Dave Rayner 45 yard field goal, Bills 14–6, Drive: 7 plays, 61 yards, 2:44.
- DET – Calvin Johnson 20 yard pass from Shaun Hill (pass failed), Bills 14–12, Drive: 15 plays, 88 yards, 3:31.

Top passers

- DET – Shaun Hill – 29/50, 323 yards, 1 touchdown, 1 interception
- BUF – Ryan Fitzpatrick – 12/24, 146 yards, 1 touchdown

Top rushers

- DET – Jahvid Best – 17 rushes, 35 yards
- BUF – Fred Jackson – 25 rushes, 133 yards, 1 touchdown

Top receivers

- DET – Calvin Johnson – 10 receptions, 128 yards, 1 touchdown
- BUF – Lee Evans – 2 receptions, 52 yards

Top tacklers

- DET – Julian Peterson – 5 tackles, 1 assist
- BUF – Paul Posluszny – 11 tackles, 2 assist

Still on the hunt for their first win of the season the Bills played on home ground for an interconference duel with the Lions. In the 2nd quarter the Bills took the lead after RB Fred Jackson got a 1-yard TD run. In that quarter the Lions only came away with a 25-yard field goal by Dave Rayner. The Bills increased their lead in the third quarter with QB Ryan Fitzpatrick completing a 16-yard TD pass to Jackson. The Lions tried to come back in the 4th quarter with Rayner making a 45-yard field goal and with QB Shaun Hill throwing a 20-yard TD pass to WR Calvin Johnson. The two-point conversion attempt failed, giving the Bills their first victory of the season and eliminating their chances of a winless season.

With the win, the Bills improved to 1–8.

=== Week 11: at Cincinnati Bengals ===
Week 11: Buffalo Bills at Cincinnati Bengals – Game summary

| Quarter | 1 | 2 | 3 | 4 | Total |
|---|---|---|---|---|---|
| Bills | 7 | 7 | 14 | 21 | 49 |
| Bengals | 7 | 24 | 0 | 0 | 31 |

at Paul Brown Stadium, Cincinnati, Ohio

- Date: November 21
- Game time: 1:00 p.m. EST
- Game weather: 65 °F (18 °C) (18.3 °C)
- Game attendance: 55,654
- Referee: Ed Hochuli
- TV announcers (CBS): Gus Johnson and Steve Tasker
- http://www.nfl.com/gamecenter/2010112102/2010/REG11/bills@bengals

Game information

First quarter

- CIN – Chad Ochocinco 2 yard pass from Carson Palmer (Aaron Pettrey kick), Bengals 7–0, Drive: 13 plays, 62 yards, 6:53.
- BUF – Fred Jackson 7 yard run (Rian Lindell kick), Tied 7–7, Drive: 12 plays, 89 yards, 6:03.

Second quarter

- CIN – Terrell Owens 4 yard pass from Carson Palmer (Aaron Pettrey kick), Bengals 14–7, Drive: 6 plays, 78 yards, 2:54.
- CIN – Cedric Benson 1 yard run (Aaron Pettrey kick), Bengals 21–7, Drive: 4 plays, 34 yards, 2:18.
- CIN – Johnathan Joseph 21 yard interception return (Aaron Pettrey kick), Bengals 28–7,
- BUF – Donald Jones 28 yard pass from Ryan Fitzpatrick (Rian Lindell kick), Bengals 28–14, Drive: 4 plays, 56 yards, 1:21.
- CIN – Aaron Pettrey 19 yard field goal, Bengals 31–14, Drive: 6 plays, 59 yards, 1:17.

Third quarter

- BUF – Stevie Johnson 28 yard pass from Ryan Fitzpatrick (Rian Lindell kick), Bengals 31–21, Drive: 9 plays, 68 yards, 4:17.
- BUF – Drayton Florence 27 yard fumble return (Rian Lindell kick), Bengals 31–28,

Fourth quarter

- BUF – Steve Johnson 11 yard pass from Ryan Fitzpatrick (Rian Lindell kick), Bills 35–31, Drive: 8 plays, 49 yards, 3:47.
- BUF – Steve Johnson 32 yard pass from Ryan Fitzpatrick (Rian Lindell kick), Bills 42–31, Drive: 3 plays, 49 yards, 1:29.
- BUF – Fred Jackson 30 yard run (Rian Lindell kick), Bills 49–31, Drive: 2 plays, 36 yards, 0:38.

Top passers

- BUF – Ryan Fitzpatrick – 21/34, 316 yards, 4 touchdowns, 2 interceptions
- CIN – Carson Palmer – 19/34, 230 yards, 2 touchdowns, 2 interceptions

Top rushers

- BUF – Fred Jackson – 21 rushes, 116 yards, 2 touchdowns
- CIN – Cedric Benson – 25 rushes, 124 yards, 1 touchdown

Top receivers

- BUF – Stevie Johnson – 8 receptions, 137 yards, 3 touchdowns
- CIN – Jordan Shipley – 5 receptions, 71 yards

Top tacklers

- BUF – Paul Posluszny – 6 tackles, 4 assists
- CIN – Dhani Jones – 6 tackles, 2 assists

After coming away with their first win the Bills flew to Paul Brown Stadium for an AFC duel with the Bengals. Ryan Fitzpatrick matched his career high with four touchdown passes during Buffalo's biggest comeback in 13 years, and the Bills won their second consecutive game Sunday, 49–31 over the bumbling Cincinnati Bengals. The Bengals (2–8) appeared to be in control after Johnathan Joseph's interception return put them ahead 28–7 in the second quarter. The Bengals' smallest crowd since 2003 saw a vintage collapse. Buffalo (2–8) took advantage of Cincinnati's depleted secondary—Joseph and safety Chris Crocker went out late in the first half—for its biggest comeback since it overcame a 26–0 deficit and topped the Indianapolis Colts 37–35 on Sep 21, 1997, according to STATS LLC. Steve Johnson caught three of the touchdown passes, including an 11-yarder that put Buffalo ahead 35–31 early in the fourth quarter. Johnson finished with eight catches for 137 yards and 3 touchdowns.

With the win, Buffalo improved to 2–8 and are still in postseason contention.

After Week 11, The Buffalo Bills won the GMC Never Say Never Moment of the Week and now are nominated for the Never Say Never moment of the 2010 season.

=== Week 12: vs. Pittsburgh Steelers ===
Week 12: Pittsburgh Steelers at Buffalo Bills – Game summary

| Quarter | 1 | 2 | 3 | 4 | OT | Total |
|---|---|---|---|---|---|---|
| Steelers | 7 | 6 | 0 | 3 | 3 | 19 |
| Bills | 0 | 0 | 7 | 9 | 0 | 16 |

at Ralph Wilson Stadium, Orchard Park, New York

- Date: November 28
- Game time: 1:00 p.m. EST
- Game weather: 36 °F (2 °C) (Cloudy)
- Game attendance: 69,642
- Referee: John Parry
- TV announcers (CBS): Kevin Harlan and Solomon Wilcots
- http://www.nfl.com/gamecenter/2010112801/2010/REG12/steelers@bills

Game information

First quarter

- PIT – Rashard Mendenhall 1 yard run (Shaun Suisham kick), Steelers 7–0, Drive: 13 plays, 78 yards, 7:54.

Second quarter

- PIT – Shaun Suisham 45 yard field goal, Steelers 10–0, Drive: 14 plays, 51 yards, 6:12.
- PIT – Shaun Suisham 46 yard field goal, Steelers 13–0, Drive: 8 plays, 54 yards, 1:39.

Third quarter

- BUF – Fred Jackson 65 yard pass from Ryan Fitzpatrick (Rian Lindell kick), Steelers 13–7, Drive: 4 plays, 80 yards, 1:09.

Fourth quarter

- BUF – Rian Lindell 29 yard field goal, Steelers 13–10, Drive: 11 plays, 69 yards, 3:45.
- BUF – Rian Lindell 32 yard field goal, Tied 13–13, Drive: 4 plays, 9 yards, 1:47.
- PIT – Shaun Suisham 48 yard field goal, Steelers 16–13, Drive: 9 plays, 50 yards, 5:06.
- BUF – Rian Lindell 49 yard field goal, Tied 16–16, Drive: 6 plays, 23 yards, 0:44.

Overtime

- PIT – Shaun Suisham 41 yard field goal, Steelers 19–16, Drive: 13 plays, 58 yards, 7:06.

Top passers

- PIT – Ben Roethlisberger – 20/33, 246 yards
- BUF – Ryan Fitzpatrick – 23/45, 265 yards, 1 touchdown, 1 interception

Top rushers

- PIT – Rashard Mendenhall – 36 rushes, 151 yards, 1 touchdown
- BUF – Fred Jackson – 12 yards, 59 yards

Top receivers

- PIT – Hines Ward – 7 receptions, 107 yards
- BUF – Fred Jackson – 5 receptions, 104 yards, 1 touchdown

Top tacklers

- PIT – James Harrison – 5 tackles, 1 assist, 1 sack, 1 forced fumble
- BUF – Donte Whitner – 8 tackles, 10 assists

Coming off their win over the Bengals, the Bills went home, donned their throwbacks, and played a Week 13 intraconference duel with the Pittsburgh Steelers. This was head coach Chan Gailey's first time facing the Steelers since leaving team in 1998 to become the new head coach of the Dallas Cowboys. Gailey served as the Steelers' wide receiver coach from 1994 to 1995 and as offensive coordinator from 1996 to 1997. Buffalo trailed early in the first quarter as Steelers running back Rashard Mendenhall got a 1-yard touchdown run. Pittsburgh added onto their lead in the second quarter with kicker Shaun Suisham getting a 45-yard and a 46-yard field goal.

The Bills answered in the third quarter as quarterback Ryan Fitzpatrick found running back Fred Jackson on a 65-yard touchdown reception. Buffalo would tie the game in the fourth quarter with a 29-yard and a 32-yard field goal from kicker Rian Lindell. The Steelers would regain the lead as Suisham made a 48-yard field goal, yet the Bills tied the game again with Lindell's 49-yard field goal. Wide Receiver Stevie Johnson dropped what would have been a 40-yard, game-ending touchdown pass in overtime. However, Pittsburgh got the last laugh in overtime as Suisham booted the game-winning 41-yard field goal.

With the loss, the Bills fell to 2–9 and were eliminated from postseason contention.

=== Week 13: at Minnesota Vikings ===
Week 13: Buffalo Bills at Minnesota Vikings – Game summary

| Quarter | 1 | 2 | 3 | 4 | Total |
|---|---|---|---|---|---|
| Bills | 7 | 0 | 0 | 7 | 14 |
| Vikings | 7 | 24 | 0 | 7 | 38 |

at Mall of America Field at Hubert H. Humphrey Metrodome, Minneapolis, Minnesota

- Date: December 5
- Game time: 1:00 p.m. EST/12:00 p.m. CST
- Game weather: None (dome stadium)
- Game attendance: 64,012
- Referee: Jerome Boger
- TV announcers (CBS): Kevin Harlan and Solomon Wilcots
- http://www.nfl.com/gamecenter/2010120500/2010/REG13/bills@vikings

Game information

First quarter

- BUF – Drayton Florence 40 yard interception return (Rian Lindell kick), Bills 7–0,
- MIN – Sidney Rice 31 yard pass from Tarvaris Jackson (Ryan Longwell kick), Tied 7–7, Drive: 5 plays, 70 yards, 2:49.

Second quarter

- MIN – Adrian Peterson 2 yard run (Ryan Longwell kick), Vikings 14–7, Drive: 4 plays, 14 yards, 1:41.
- MIN – Adrian Peterson 3 yard run (Ryan Longwell kick), Vikings 21–7, Drive: 5 plays, 60 yards, 2:07.
- MIN – Sidney Rice 6 yard pass from Tarvaris Jackson (Ryan Longwell kick), Vikings 28–7, Drive: 2 plays, 5 yards, 0:47.
- MIN – Ryan Longwell 38 yard field goal, Vikigns 31–7, Drive: 12 plays, 62 yards, 5:08.

Third quarter

Fourth quarter

- MIN – Adrian Peterson 43 yard run (Ryan Longwell kick), Vikings 38–7, Drive: 1 plays, 43 yards, 0:06.
- BUF – David Nelson 12 yard pass from Ryan Fitzpatrick (Rian Lindell kick), Vikings 38–14, Drive: 5 plays, 43 yards, 1:02.

Top passers

- BUF – Ryan Fitzpatrick – 15/25, 158 yards, 1 touchdown, 1 interception
- MIN – Tarvaris Jackson – 15/22, 187 yards, 2 touchdowns, 3 interceptions

Top rushers

- BUF – Fred Jackson – 11 rushes, 42 yards
- MIN – Adrian Peterson – 16 rushes, 107 yards, 3 touchdowns

Top receivers

- BUF – Lee Evans – 3 receptions, 82 yards
- MIN – Sidney Rice – 5 receptions, 102 yards, 2 touchdowns

Top tacklers

- BUF – Paul Posluszny – 11 tackles, 4 assists, 1 sack
- MIN – Husain Abdullah – 5 tackles, 2 assists

The Bills' twelfth game was an interconference duel with the Vikings. It featured Bills LB Arthur Moats' hit on Vikings QB Brett Favre, which would end the longest streak of quarterback starts in NFL history at 297 games. The Bills took the lead with CB Drayton Florence returning an interception 40 yards for a touchdown. They soon fell behind with Vikings backup QB Tarvaris Jackson throwing a 31-yard TD pass to WR Sidney Rice. Followed in the second quarter by RB Adrian Peterson getting a 2 and a 3-yard TD run. Then Jackson found Rice again on a 6-yard TD pass, followed by kicker Ryan Longwell nailing a 38-yard field goal. They continued to struggle in the fourth quarter when Peterson ran 43 yards to the endzone for a touchdown. The Bills responded with QB Ryan Fitzpatrick getting a 12-yard TD pass to TE David Martin.

With the loss, Buffalo fell to 2–10.

=== Week 14: vs. Cleveland Browns ===
Week 14: Cleveland Browns at Buffalo Bills – Game summary

| Quarter | 1 | 2 | 3 | 4 | Total |
|---|---|---|---|---|---|
| Browns | 3 | 3 | 0 | 0 | 6 |
| Bills | 0 | 10 | 0 | 3 | 13 |

at Ralph Wilson Stadium, Orchard Park, New York

- Date: December 12
- Game time: 1:00 p.m. EST
- Game weather: 36 °F (2 °C) (Rain)
- Game attendance: 50,861
- Referee: Scott Green
- TV announcers (CBS): Don Criqui and Steve Beuerlein
- http://www.nfl.com/gamecenter/2010121201/2010/REG14/browns@bills

Game information

First quarter

- CLE – Phil Dawson 19 yard field goal, Browns 3–0, Drive: 9 plays, 54 yards, 4:49.

Second quarter

- BUF – David Nelson 11 yard pass from Ryan Fitzpatrick (Rian Lindell kick), Bills 7–3, Drive: 14 plays, 89 yards, 8:14.
- CLE – Phil Dawson 25 yard field goal, Bills 7–6, Drive: 11 plays, 73 yards, 5:36.
- BUF – Rian Lindell 30 yard field goal, Bills 10–6, Drive: 9 plays, 63 yards, 3:38.

Third quarter

Fourth quarter

- BUF – Rian Lindell 19 yard field goal, Bills 13–6, Drive: 6 plays, 22 yards, 3:07.

Top passers

- CLE – Jake Delhomme – 12/20, 86 yards, 1 interception
- BUF – Ryan Fitzpatrick – 14/23, 142 yards, 1 touchdown

Top rushers

- CLE – Peyton Hillis – 21 rushes, 108 yards
- BUF – Fred Jackson – 29 rushes, 112 yards

Top receivers

- CLE – Mohamed Massaquoi – 3 receptions, 43 yards
- BUF – Jonathan Stupar – 3 receptions, 45 yards

Top tacklers

- CLE – T. J. Ward – 7 tackles, 1 assist
- BUF – Akin Ayodele – 6 tackles, 4 assists

Hoping to snap a two-game losing streak the Bills played on home ground for an AFC duel against the Browns. The Bills trailed early as kicker Phil Dawson got a 19-yard field goal, but they took the lead in the second quarter as QB Ryan Fitzpatrick completed an 11-yard TD pass to WR David Nelson. The lead was narrowed when Dawson made a 25-yard field goal, but was expanded after kicker Rian Lindell nailed a 30 and a 19-yard field goal.

With the win, the Bills improved to 3–10.

=== Week 15: at Miami Dolphins ===
Week 15: Buffalo Bills at Miami Dolphins – Game summary

| Quarter | 1 | 2 | 3 | 4 | Total |
|---|---|---|---|---|---|
| Bills | 0 | 10 | 7 | 0 | 17 |
| Dolphins | 0 | 7 | 0 | 7 | 14 |

at Sun Life Stadium, Miami Gardens, Florida

- Date: December 19
- Game time: 1:00 p.m. EST
- Game weather: 67 °F (19 °C) (Cloudy)
- Game attendance: 65,511
- Referee: Jeff Triplette
- TV announcers (CBS): Bill Macatee and Rich Gannon
- Recap

Game information

First quarter

Second quarter

- BUF – David Nelson 18 yard pass from Ryan Fitzpatrick (Rian Lindell kick), Bills 7–0, Drive: 9 plays, 35 yards, 4:26.
- BUF – Rian Lindell 29 yard field goal, Bills 10–0, Drive: 5 plays, 32 yards, 1:59.
- MIA – Ronnie Brown 6 yard run (Dan Carpenter kick), Bills 10–7, Drive: 8 plays, 64 yards, 3:57.

Third quarter

- BUF – Stevie Johnson 15 yard pass from Ryan Fitzpatrick (Rian Lindell kick), Bills 17–7, Drive: 11 plays, 86 yards, 6:25.

Fourth quarter

- MIA – Brandon Marshall 9 yard pass from Chad Henne (Dan Carpenter kick), Bills 17–14, Drive: 11 plays, 77 yards, 6:59.

Top passers

- BUF – Ryan Fizpatrick – 16/26, 223 yards, 2 touchdowns, 1 interception
- MIA – Chad Henne – 33/45, 276 yards, 1 touchdown, 1 interception

Top rushers

- BUF – Fred Jackson – 15 rushes, 36 yards
- MIA – Ronnie Brown – 10 rushes, 39 yards, 1 touchdown

Top receivers

- BUF – Stevie Johnson – 6 receptions, 69 yards, 1 touchdown
- MIA – Brandon Marshall – 11 receptions, 106 yards, 1 touchdown

Top tacklers

- BUF – Drayton Florence – 7 tackles
- MIA – Yeremiah Bell – 9 tackles

Coming off their win over the Browns the Bills flew south to Sun Life Stadium for an AFC East rivalry rematch against the Dolphins. The second quarter saw the Bills taking the early advantage with QB Ryan Fitzpatrick completing an 18-yard TD pass to WR David Nelson. This was followed by kicker Rian Lindell nailing a 29-yard field goal. The Dolphins responded with RB Ronnie Brown getting a 6-yard TD run, but the Bills increased their lead in the third quarter with Fitzpatrick throwing a 15-yard TD pass to WR Stevie Johnson. The lead was narrowed in the fourth quarter with QB Chad Henne getting a 9-yard TD pass to WR Brandon Marshall, but the Bills defense was solid enough to hang them on for the win.

With the win, Buffalo improved to 4–10.

=== Week 16: vs. New England Patriots ===
Week 16: New England Patriots at Buffalo Bills – Game summary

| Quarter | 1 | 2 | 3 | 4 | Total |
|---|---|---|---|---|---|
| Patriots | 7 | 17 | 7 | 3 | 34 |
| Bills | 3 | 0 | 0 | 0 | 3 |

at Ralph Wilson Stadium, Orchard Park, New York

- Date: December 26
- Game time: 1:00 p.m. EST
- Game weather: 22 °F (−6 °C) (Cloudy)
- Game attendance: 68,281
- Referee: Alberto Riveron
- TV announcers (CBS): Kevin Harlan and Solomon Wilcots
- Recap

Game information

First quarter

- BUF – Rian Lindell 26 yard field goal, Bills 3–0, Drive: 10 plays, 64 yards, 4:52.
- NE – Danny Woodhead 29 yard run (Shayne Graham kick), Patriots 7–3, Drive: 4 plays, 48 yards, 1:47.

Second quarter

- NE – Rob Gronkowski 8 yard pass from Tom Brady (Shayne Graham kick), Patriots 14–3, Drive: 9 plays, 80 yards, 4:25.
- NE – Shayne Graham 34 yard field goal, Patriots 17–3, Drive: 10 plays, 52 yards, 3:35.
- NE – Alge Crumpler 4 yard pass from Tom Brady (Shayne Graham kick), Patriots 24–3, Drive: 7 plays, 27 yards, 1:51.

Third quarter

- NE – Rob Gronkowski 8 yard pass from Tom Brady (Shayne Graham kick), Patriots 31–3, Drive: 3 plays, 11 yards, 0:44.

Fourth quarter

- NE – Shayne Graham 26 yard field goal, Patriots 34–3, Drive: 11 plays, 47 yards, 5:53.

Top passers

- NE – Tom Brady – 15/27, 140 yards, 3 touchdowns
- BUF – Ryan Fitzpatrick – 18/37, 251 yards, 3 interceptions

Top rushers

- NE – BenJarvus Green-Ellis – 19 rushes, 104 yards
- BUF – Fred Jackson – 13 rushes, 81 yards

Top receivers

- NE – Rob Gronkowski – 4 receptions, 54 yards, 2 touchdowns
- BUF – Naaman Roosevelt – 4 receptions, 74 yards

Top tacklers

- NE – Tully Banta-Cain – 6 tackles, 2 assists
- BUF – Akin Ayodele – 11 tackles, 6 assists

Coming off their win over the Dolphins the Bills played an AFC East rivalry rematch against the Patriots. In the first quarter the Bills had the early lead as kicker Rian Lindell hit a 26-yard field goal, but failed to maintain this lead as the Patriots dominated the rest of the game with Danny Woodhead getting a 29-yard TD run, followed by QB Tom Brady completing an 8-yard TD pass to TE Rob Gronkowski, then with kicker Shayne Graham nailing a 34-yard field goal, and with Brady completing a 4 and an 8-yard TD pass to TE Alge Crumpler and to Gronkowski. After that Graham made a 26-yard field goal.

With their 15th loss in a row to the Patriots, the Bills fell to 4–11.

=== Week 17: at New York Jets ===
Week Seventeen: Buffalo Bills (4–11) at New York Jets (10–5)

| Quarter | 1 | 2 | 3 | 4 | Total |
|---|---|---|---|---|---|
| Bills | 0 | 0 | 7 | 0 | 7 |
| Jets | 10 | 7 | 7 | 14 | 38 |

at New Meadowlands Stadium • East Rutherford, New Jersey

- Date: January 2
- Game time: 1:00 p.m. EST
- Game weather: Overcast • 48 °F (9 °C) • Wind W 5 miles per hour (8.0 km/h; 4.3 kn)
- Game attendance: 79,019
- Referee: Carl Cheffers
- TV announcers (CBS): Gus Johnson and Steve Tasker
- GameBook

Game information

Bills

- Brian Brohm
  10/23, 106 Yds, 3 INT
- Fred Jackson
  13 Rush, 35 Yds
- Stevie Johnson
  5 Rec, 72 Yds

Jets

- Mark Brunell
  6/12, 110 Yds, 2 TD, INT
- Joe McKnight
  32 Rush, 158 Yds
- Braylon Edwards
  1 Rec, 52 Yds, TD

The Bills' final game was a division rivalry rematch against the Jets. The Bills trailed early with kicker Nick Folk making a 28-yard field goal. Their offense struggled as CB Marquice Cole returned an interception 35 yards for a touchdown, which was then followed by QB Mark Brunell making a 17-yard TD pass to WR Santonio Holmes. The Bills made their only score of the game with FS Jairus Byrd returning an interception 37 yards for a touchdown, but they fell further behind after Brunell found WR Braylon Edwards on a 52-yard TD pass. This was followed by QB Kellen Clemens scrambling 10 yards for a touchdown, then with RB John Conner getting a 16-yard TD run.

With the loss, the Bills finish with a 4–12 record.

Scoring summary

| Quarter | Time | Drive | | | Team | Scoring information | Score | |
| Quarter | Time | Plays | Yards | TOP | Team | Scoring information | Bills | Jets |
|---|---|---|---|---|---|---|---|---|
| 1 | 4:58 | 12 | 79 | 7:30 | Jets | 28-yard field goal by Nick Folk | 0 | 3 |
| 2 | 9:07 | | | | Jets | Interception returned 35 yards for touchdown by Marquice Cole, Nick Folk kick good | 0 | 10 |
| 2 | 0:15 | 8 | 59 | 1:45 | Jets | Santonio Holmes 17-yard touchdown reception from Mark Brunell, Nick Folk kick good | 0 | 17 |
| 3 | 13:06 | | | | Bills | Interception returned 37 yards for touchdown by Jairus Byrd, Rian Lindell kick good | 7 | 17 |
| 3 | 6:41 | 2 | 58 | 0:46 | Jets | Braylon Edwards 52-yard touchdown reception from Mark Brunell, Nick Folk kick good | 7 | 24 |
| 4 | 9:18 | 5 | 27 | 2:31 | Jets | Kellen Clemens 10-yard touchdown run, Nick Folk kick good | 7 | 31 |
| 4 | 6:45 | 5 | 34 | 2:17 | Jets | John Conner 16-yard touchdown run, Nick Folk kick good | 7 | 38 |
| "TOP" = time of possession. For other American football terms, see Glossary of American football. | | | | | | | 7 | 38 |
