= David Nelson (wide receiver) =

American football player (born 1986)

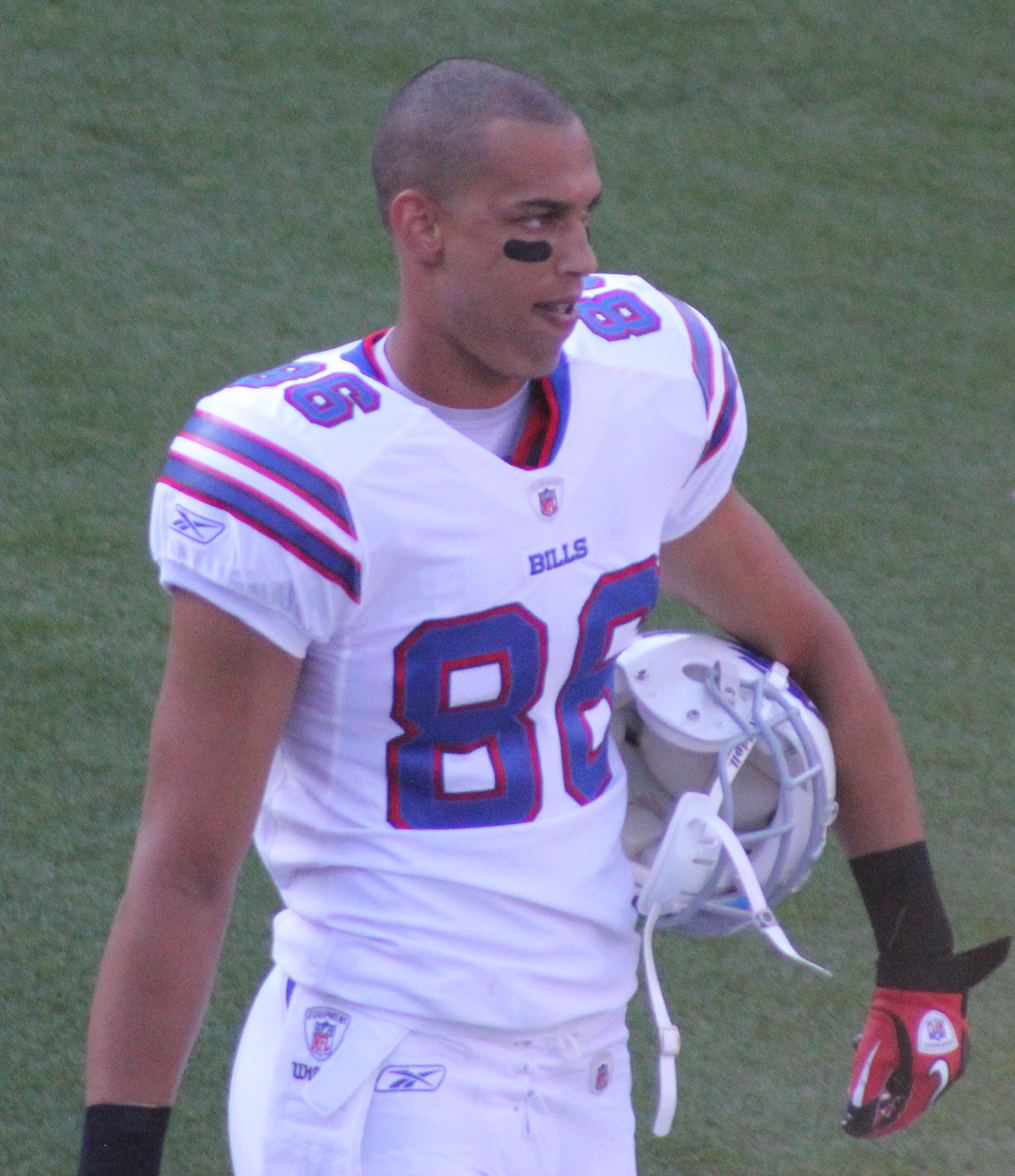
- Nelson with the Buffalo Bills in 2011

No. 86
- Position: Wide receiver

Personal information
- Born: November 7, 1986 (age 40); Dallas, Texas, U.S.
- Listed height: 6 ft 5 in (1.96 m)
- Listed weight: 217 lb (98 kg)

Career information
- High school: S. H. Rider (Wichita Falls, Texas)
- College: Florida
- NFL draft: 2010: undrafted

Career history
- Buffalo Bills (2010–2012); Cleveland Browns (2013)*; New York Jets (2013–2014); Pittsburgh Steelers (2015)
- * Offseason or practice squad member only

Awards and highlights
- BCS national champion (2007, 2009)

Career NFL statistics
- Receptions: 138
- Receiving yards: 1,530
- Receiving touchdowns: 10
- Stats at Pro Football Reference

David Alan Nelson (born November 7, 1986) is an American former professional football player who was a wide receiver in the National Football League (NFL). He played college football for the Florida Gators, where he was a member of two BCS National Championship teams. He was signed by the Buffalo Bills as an undrafted free agent in 2010, and also played for the New York Jets.

== Early life ==
Nelson was born in Wichita Falls, Texas, in 1986. He began his high school career at 1A Petrolia High School, winning the 2002 Texas 1A State Championship. Beginning his junior year, he attended S. H. Rider High School in Wichita Falls, where he played for the Rider Raiders high school football team. As a senior, Nelson was team captain and had ninety-one receptions for 1,641 yards and eighteen touchdowns.

== College career ==
Nelson accepted an athletic scholarship to attend the University of Florida in Gainesville, Florida, where he played for coach Urban Meyer's Florida Gators football team from 2005 to 2009. The Gators coaching staff elected to redshirt Nelson as a true freshman in 2005. During his time as a Gator, the team won two SEC Championship Games (2006, 2008) and two BCS National Championship Games (2007, 2009). The highlight of his 2009 senior season was a four-reception day for fifty-three yards against the Alabama Crimson Tide in the 2009 SEC Championship Game. During his four-season college career, Nelson played in forty-four games, started fourteen, and made forty-six receptions for 630 yards (a 13.7-yard average) and seven touchdowns. Nelson was the recipient of quarterback Tim Tebow's "jump pass" in the 2009 BCS National Championship Game which cemented the Gators' 24–14 victory over the Oklahoma Sooners.

Nelson graduated from the University of Florida with a bachelor's degree in sociology in 2009.

== Professional career ==
Pre-draft measurables
Height	Weight	40-yard dash	10-yard split	20-yard split	20-yard shuttle	Three-cone drill	Vertical jump	Broad jump	Bench press
6 ft 5 1/4 in (1.96 m)	217 lb (98 kg)	4.54 s	1.56 s	2.64 s	4.13 s	6.79 s	38.0 in (0.97 m)	9 ft 4 in (2.84 m)	16 reps
All values from Pro Day

=== Buffalo Bills ===
The Buffalo Bills signed Nelson as undrafted free agent, and he made his professional debut in the Bills' October 3, 2010 game against the New York Jets. Nelson had two consecutive touchdowns catches in the 2010 season from quarterback Ryan Fitzpatrick in games against Cleveland and Miami, in weeks 14 and 15. In 2011, Nelson finished the season with 658 yards and 5 touchdowns, finishing second on the team behind only Stevie Johnson. Following the 2012 season, which was cut short after he tore his ACL in week 1, the Bills did not tender a new contract, and Nelson became an unrestricted free agent.

=== Cleveland Browns ===
Nelson was signed by the Cleveland Browns on April 8, 2013. He was cut by the Browns on August 31, 2013.

=== New York Jets ===
Nelson was signed by the New York Jets on October 2, 2013. He had 36 receptions for 423 yards and a pair of touchdowns during the 2013 season. Nelson was released on October 18, 2014 after the Jets had traded for Percy Harvin.

=== Pittsburgh Steelers ===
On August 12, 2015, Nelson was signed by the Pittsburgh Steelers to a 1-year, $745,000 deal. At his first practice with the Steelers, Nelson suffered a shoulder injury. On August 25, 2015, the Steelers announced that after receiving an MRI on his shoulder, Nelson had been added to the injured/reserved list.

== NFL career statistics ==
Receiving Stats

Year	Team	GP	Rec	Tgt	Yards	Avg	Lng	TD	FD
2010	BUF	15	31	48	353	11.4	37	3	19
2011	BUF	16	61	98	658	10.8	35	5	32
2012	BUF	1	2	5	31	15.5	21	0	2
2013	NYJ	12	36	60	423	11.8	31	2	20
Total		44	130	211	1,465	11.3	37	10	73

== Personal life ==
Nelson made national headlines in 2011 as a member of the Bills when they played the Dallas Cowboys, as his girlfriend at the time, Kelsi Reich, was a cheerleader for the Cowboys. He promised to do "something special" for her if he scored a touchdown in the game. After catching a touchdown pass from Ryan Fitzpatrick, Nelson jogged along the sidelines until he found Reich. They embraced and he gave her the scoring ball.

Nelson married Madison Sadri of Charlotte, North Carolina on June 9, 2017. They have 4 children, Easton John, born April 2018, Noah Ally, born October 2019, Navy Reign, born December 2022 and Haven, born October 2024.

Nelson and his brothers have started a non-profit organization, I'mME, that focuses on ending the orphan cycle. They were inspired by a trip to Haiti in 2012.

== See also ==
- List of Buffalo Bills players
