= Reggie Corner =

American football player (born 1983)

No. 27
- Position: Cornerback

Personal information
- Born: November 17, 1983 (age 42); Canton, Ohio, U.S.
- Listed height: 5 ft 10 in (1.78 m)
- Listed weight: 175 lb (79 kg)

Career information
- High school: Canton McKinley
- College: Akron
- NFL draft: 2008: 4th round, 114th overall pick

Career history
- Buffalo Bills (2008–2011); Jacksonville Jaguars (2012)

Career NFL statistics
- Total tackles: 119
- Sacks: 1
- Forced fumbles: 1
- Fumble recoveries: 1
- Interceptions: 2
- Stats at Pro Football Reference

Reggie Corner (born November 17, 1983) is an American former professional football player who was a cornerback in the National Football League (NFL). He played college football for the Akron Zips and was selected by the Buffalo Bills in the fourth round of the 2008 NFL draft.

He also played for the Jacksonville Jaguars.

== Professional career ==
=== Buffalo Bills ===
Corner was selected by Buffalo in the fourth round (114th overall) of the 2008 NFL draft.

On September 3, 2011, Corner was released during final cuts. The Bills re-signed him on September 14. He became a free agent after the season.

=== Jacksonville Jaguars ===
On June 20, 2012, Corner was signed by the Jacksonville Jaguars. Corner suffered a knee injury during the first week of training camp and was placed on injured reserve.

He was released by the Jaguars on October 3, 2012.

== NFL career statistics ==
Legend
| **Bold** | Career high |

=== Regular season ===
| Year | Team | Games | | Tackles | | | | | Interceptions | | | | | Fumbles | | | |
| Year | Team | GP | GS | Cmb | Solo | Ast | Sck | TFL | Int | Yds | TD | Lng | PD | FF | FR | Yds | TD |
|---|---|---|---|---|---|---|---|---|---|---|---|---|---|---|---|---|---|
| 2008 | BUF | 12 | 2 | 22 | 19 | 3 | 0.0 | 0 | 0 | 0 | 0 | 0 | 4 | **1** | **1** | -2 | 0 |
| 2009 | BUF | **16** | **8** | **67** | **52** | **15** | 0.0 | **3** | **1** | 0 | 0 | 0 | **9** | 0 | 0 | 0 | 0 |
| 2010 | BUF | **16** | 2 | 25 | 20 | 5 | **1.0** | 1 | 0 | 0 | 0 | 0 | 5 | 0 | 0 | 0 | 0 |
| 2011 | BUF | 11 | 1 | 5 | 4 | 1 | 0.0 | 0 | **1** | **4** | 0 | **4** | 3 | 0 | 0 | 0 | 0 |
| Career | | 55 | 13 | 119 | 95 | 24 | 1.0 | 4 | 2 | 4 | 0 | 4 | 21 | 1 | 1 | -2 | 0 |

== Personal life ==
In 2024, Corner was hired as principal of Canton College Preparatory School in Canton, Ohio.
