= Roscoe Parrish =

American football player (born 1982)

No. 11, 12
- Position: Wide receiver / Punt returner

Personal information
- Born: July 16, 1982 (age 44); Miami, Florida, U.S.
- Listed height: 5 ft 9 in (1.75 m)
- Listed weight: 175 lb (79 kg)

Career information
- High school: Miami (FL)
- College: Miami (FL)
- NFL draft: 2005: 2nd round, 55th overall pick

Career history
- Buffalo Bills (2005–2011); San Diego Chargers (2012)*; Oakland Raiders (2012)*; Tampa Bay Buccaneers (2012)
- * Offseason or practice squad member only

Awards and highlights
- BCS national champion (2001); Second-team All-ACC (2004)

Career NFL statistics
- Receptions: 134
- Receiving yards: 1,502
- Receiving touchdowns: 7
- Return yards: 2,691
- Return touchdowns: 3
- Stats at Pro Football Reference

Roscoe Parrish (born July 16, 1982) is an American former professional football player who was a wide receiver and kick returner. He was selected by the Buffalo Bills of the National Football League (NFL) in the second round (55th overall) of the 2005 NFL draft. He played college football at the University of Miami.

== Collegiate career and early life ==
Parrish played quarterback at Miami Senior High. He then attended the University of Miami and converted to the wide receiver position and finished his college career with 81 receptions. He is the cousin of NFL running back Branden Oliver.

=== Track and field ===
Parrish was also a track star at the University of Miami, where he ran the 60 meters, 100 meters and 200 meters, posting personal bests of 6.89 seconds, 10.65 seconds and 21.13 seconds, respectively.

He also competed in the 55 meters, posting a personal best time of 6.38 seconds.

==== Personal bests ====
Event	Time (seconds)	Venue	Date
55 meters	6.38	Gainesville, Florida	January 18, 2003
60 meters	6.89	Syracuse, New York	February 16, 2002
100 meters	10.65	Coral Gables, Florida	April 12, 2003
200 meters	21.13	Storrs, Connecticut	May 4, 2003

== Professional career ==
=== 2005 NFL Combine ===
Pre-draft measurables
Height	Weight	Arm length	Hand span	40-yard dash	10-yard split	20-yard split	20-yard shuttle	Three-cone drill	Vertical jump	Broad jump	Bench press
5 ft 9 3/4 in (1.77 m)	170 lb (77 kg)	29 1/4 in (0.74 m)	8 5/8 in (0.22 m)	4.37 s	1.56 s	2.54 s	4.20 s	6.64 s	36 in (0.91 m)	10 ft 6 in (3.20 m)	10 reps
All values from NFL Combine/Pro Day

=== Buffalo Bills ===
The Buffalo Bills drafted Parrish in the second round (55th overall) during the 2005 NFL draft.

==== 2005 season ====
Parrish's NFL career with the Buffalo Bills got off to a slow start, with Parrish missing the first six games due to injury. Parrish played in a limited role for the next 10 games, finishing the 2005 season with 15 receptions for 148 yards (9.9 avg.) and one touchdown. He also returned several punts and kickoffs for the team.

==== 2006 season ====
Parrish served as the Bills fourth wide receiver. Parrish finished the year with 23 receptions for 320 yards (13.9 avg.) and 2 touchdowns. As a punt returner, Parrish gained 364 yards on 32 attempts (11.4 avg.) and one score.

Parrish's finest moment came when he ran back an 82-yard punt return for a touchdown in a win against the Jacksonville Jaguars. In the same game, he caught a 30-yard pass from quarterback J. P. Losman to set up the Bills' game-winning field goal.

==== 2007 season ====
Parrish returned his first punt return of the season for a touchdown against the Denver Broncos. He became the first player in the 2007 season to score a rushing touchdown, a receiving touchdown, and a punt return touchdown. For the second season in a row, Parrish finished the season with over 300 receiving yards and 360 total return yards, achieving 352 receiving yards on 35 receptions, 440 punt return yards, and 126 kickoff return yards.

==== 2008 season ====
In the Bills season opener against the Seattle Seahawks, Parrish returned a punt return 63 yards for a touchdown. His return stats ultimately declined this year as he shared return responsibilities with rookie cornerback Leodis McKelvin. He caught 24 passes for 232 yards, receiving his lone touchdown against the Oakland Raiders to help the Bills win 24–23.

==== 2009 season ====
Parrish's role as a receiver decreased in 2009 as the Bills signed superstar receiver Terrell Owens in the off-season, as he only caught 3 passes for 44 yards. Parrish had a notable blunder during a game against the Cleveland Browns, muffing a punt in the fourth quarter that set up the Browns' game-winning field goal in a low-scoring 6–3 affair.

==== 2010-11 seasons ====
After the departures of both Owens and Josh Reed in free agency, Parrish resumed his role as a prominent receiver for the Bills. In just 8 games, he caught a career-high 400 receiving yards on 33 catches with two touchdowns before suffering a season-ending hand injury against the Chicago Bears that would require surgery. In week 2 of the following season, Parrish was injured again after catching his first and only reception of the year for 16 yards. The Bills placed him on injured reserve for the second year in a row.

=== San Diego Chargers ===
On April 3, 2012, Parrish signed with the San Diego Chargers, but was released on August 27, 2012.

=== Oakland Raiders ===
Later that same day, Parrish was signed by the Oakland Raiders, who needed a returner to fill in for a hurt Jacoby Ford. However, in the following preseason game against the Seattle Seahawks, Parrish fumbled both punt return attempts, did not see the field again, and was cut the following day.

=== Tampa Bay Buccaneers ===
On September 25, 2012, Parrish was signed by the Tampa Bay Buccaneers to replace Jordan Shipley as the team's kick returner. He retired after this season, finishing his career with over 1,500 receiving yards and nearly 2,700 return yards.

== Legal issues ==
On August 12, 2019, Parrish was arrested in Fort Lauderdale, Florida with criminal charges of stalking and written threats to kill. He had allegedly begun harassing a former girlfriend and her daughter after the relationship ended in July 2018.
