= Demetress Bell =

American football player (born 1984)

No. 77
- Position: Offensive tackle

Personal information
- Born: May 3, 1984 (age 42); Summerfield, Louisiana, U.S.
- Listed height: 6 ft 5 in (1.96 m)
- Listed weight: 311 lb (141 kg)

Career information
- High school: Summerfield
- College: Northwestern State (LA)
- NFL draft: 2008: 7th round, 219th overall pick

Career history
- Buffalo Bills (2008–2011); Philadelphia Eagles (2012); Dallas Cowboys (2013)*
- * Offseason or practice squad member only

Awards and highlights
- All-SLC (2007)

Career NFL statistics
- Games played: 40
- Games started: 35
- Stats at Pro Football Reference

Demetress Carte Bell (born May 3, 1984), formerly known as Demetrius Bell, is an American former professional football player who was an offensive tackle in the National Football League (NFL). After playing college football for the Northwestern State Demons, he was selected by the Buffalo Bills in the seventh round of the 2008 NFL draft.

Bell played for the Bills for three seasons and one season in Philadelphia. He is notable for making the NFL and playing for half a decade without ever having played a down of high school football, or having gone to college with the intention of playing football. He is the son of NBA Hall of Famer Karl Malone.

== Early life ==
Bell, who spelled his first name "Demetrius" until 2012 when he discovered it was actually spelled "Demetress", was born in 1984 to 13-year-old Gloria Bell of Summerfield, Louisiana, and Karl Malone, then a 20-year-old college basketball player and future National Basketball Association (NBA) star, and a fellow native of Summerfield. Malone and Bell had previously spoken on only one occasion prior to repairing their relationship in 2014.

As a young teenager, Bell played more softball than he did Malone's sport of basketball. He did not play organized football at all during that time. Eventually, during high school, he took up basketball and played well enough to receive a scholarship to Northwestern State University, where he played in 88 games over the course of the 2003–04, 2004–05, and 2006–07 seasons. Bell was one of only four NCAA athletes to play both basketball and football in Division I in 2007. After the 2006–07 season, he decided to give up basketball to concentrate on his development in football.

== College career ==
Bell's high school had not fielded a football team, so prior to his attending Northwestern State, he had never played organized football. In the fall of 2005, he red-shirted the basketball season and began playing for the school's football team. He was initially placed in the position of defensive end. The following year, injuries struck the team's offensive line, and he was moved to the left tackle position. He earned second-team All-Louisiana honors that season.

Bell made a bigger name for himself in his senior season of 2007, having focused solely on football. Remaining on the offensive line, he was named an All-Louisiana and an All-Southland Conference first-teamer.

Bell graduated from Northwestern State in 2008.

== Professional career ==
=== Buffalo Bills ===
Bell was selected by the Buffalo Bills in the seventh round of the 2008 NFL draft. The Bills were encouraged by his raw skills, but saw him as a longer-term project, given his inexperience in having played organized football for only three seasons at that point. However, the team chose to place him on their active roster, rather than assigning him to their practice squad, where he could potentially have been signed away by another team. Consistent with their view of him as a work in progress, Bell was not activated for play in any of the Bills' regular season games in 2008.

In 2009, citing the quality of Bell's performance in the Bills' off-season and pre-season training camps that year, then-Bills head coach Dick Jauron installed Bell as the team's starting left tackle for the 2009 regular season. After earning mixed reviews over the first half of the campaign, including an extremely high number of penalties against him, Bell's year came to a disappointing conclusion when he suffered what would prove to be a season-ending knee injury in a Week 10 game against the Tennessee Titans.

=== Philadelphia Eagles ===
On April 4, 2012, the Philadelphia Eagles signed Bell to a contract that could be worth up to $34.5 million over five years. The first year of this contract was worth $3.25 million and while he played in nine games including five starts, he suffered a few injuries and the Eagles would have been obligated to pay him more than eight million dollars if he was included on the roster in 2013. As such on February 6, 2013, Bell was released from his contract.

=== Dallas Cowboys ===
On July 21, 2013, Bell was signed by the Dallas Cowboys. He was released by the Cowboys during the preseason on August 31, 2013.

== Relationship with Karl Malone ==
Laboratory blood tests prepared for the Bell family's 1996 paternity lawsuit against Karl Malone reportedly pointed to an over 99 percent probability that Bell's father was either Malone or a brother of Malone. Malone initially refused to respond to the lawsuit, but eventually reached an out-of-court settlement with the Bell family over the issue. The Bells received a single lump sum payment of a confidential amount, with no on-going child support for Demetress. In speaking later about the settlement, Malone's attorney asserted that it had not included an official court determination of paternity, and noted that Malone "had a lot of brothers".

Although Malone was 20 years old at the time that the then-12-year-old Gloria Bell was impregnated, she said that her family chose not to pursue criminal charges against Malone over the rape. According to Bell, with Malone being a neighbor — Summerfield's population is only a few hundred — her family did not wish to see him jailed, especially since he would then be unable to provide any financial support for Demetress at all.

In 2008, The Buffalo News published a story about Bell that included the claim that he did not know who his father was until after he graduated from high school. However, in a 1998 article in The Salt Lake Tribune, when Bell was 14 years old, his mother spoke of his shying away from anything to do with Malone because his feelings were hurt by Malone's refusal to acknowledge him.

According to Bell, he had spoken to Malone on one occasion, when Bell was 17 years old. Bell reported that Malone told him that he would have to make his way on his own, as it was too late for the two men to have a father-son relationship.

Bell and Malone began to mend their relationship around 2014, and in 2018, Bell said that he and Malone talk and text "nearly every day" after going on a hunting trip together and had a close relationship. Malone said about his relationship with his older children, "I didn't handle it right; I was wrong ... Father Time is the biggest thief that's out there, and you can't get that back."

Bell has reported that he is very close to Daryl and Cheryl Ford, older twins of Malone’s that were also the subjects of a paternity suit.
