= Kellen Heard =

American football player (born 1985)

No. 72, 65, 96
- Position: Nose tackle

Personal information
- Born: October 17, 1985 (age 41); Galveston, Texas, U.S.
- Listed height: 6 ft 6 in (1.98 m)
- Listed weight: 339 lb (154 kg)

Career information
- High school: Wharton (TX)
- College: Memphis
- NFL draft: 2010: undrafted

Career history
- Oakland Raiders (2010)*; Buffalo Bills (2010−2011); St. Louis Rams (2012); Indianapolis Colts (2012−2013)
- * Offseason or practice squad member only

Career NFL statistics
- Total tackles: 27
- Sacks: 2.0
- Forced fumbles: 1
- Stats at Pro Football Reference

Kellen Heard (born October 17, 1985) is an American former professional football player who was a nose tackle in the National Football League (NFL). He played college football for the Texas A&M Aggies, then transferred to the Memphis Tigers with his last year of eligibility.

== Professional career ==
=== Oakland Raiders ===
After going undrafted in the 2010 NFL draft, Heard signed with the Oakland Raiders as an undrafted free agent on April 30, 2010. He was waived on September 4, 2010 and re-signed to the practice squad two days later.

=== Buffalo Bills ===
On December 11, 2010 Heard was signed off the Raiders practice Squad by the Buffalo Bills.

=== St. Louis Rams ===
Heard was claimed off waivers by the St. Louis Rams in September 2012. He was released by the Rams on November 14.

=== Indianapolis Colts ===
On November 27, 2012, Heard was signed by the Indianapolis Colts for undisclosed terms. On August 25, 2013, he was waived by the Colts.
