= Garrison Sanborn =

American football player (born 1985)

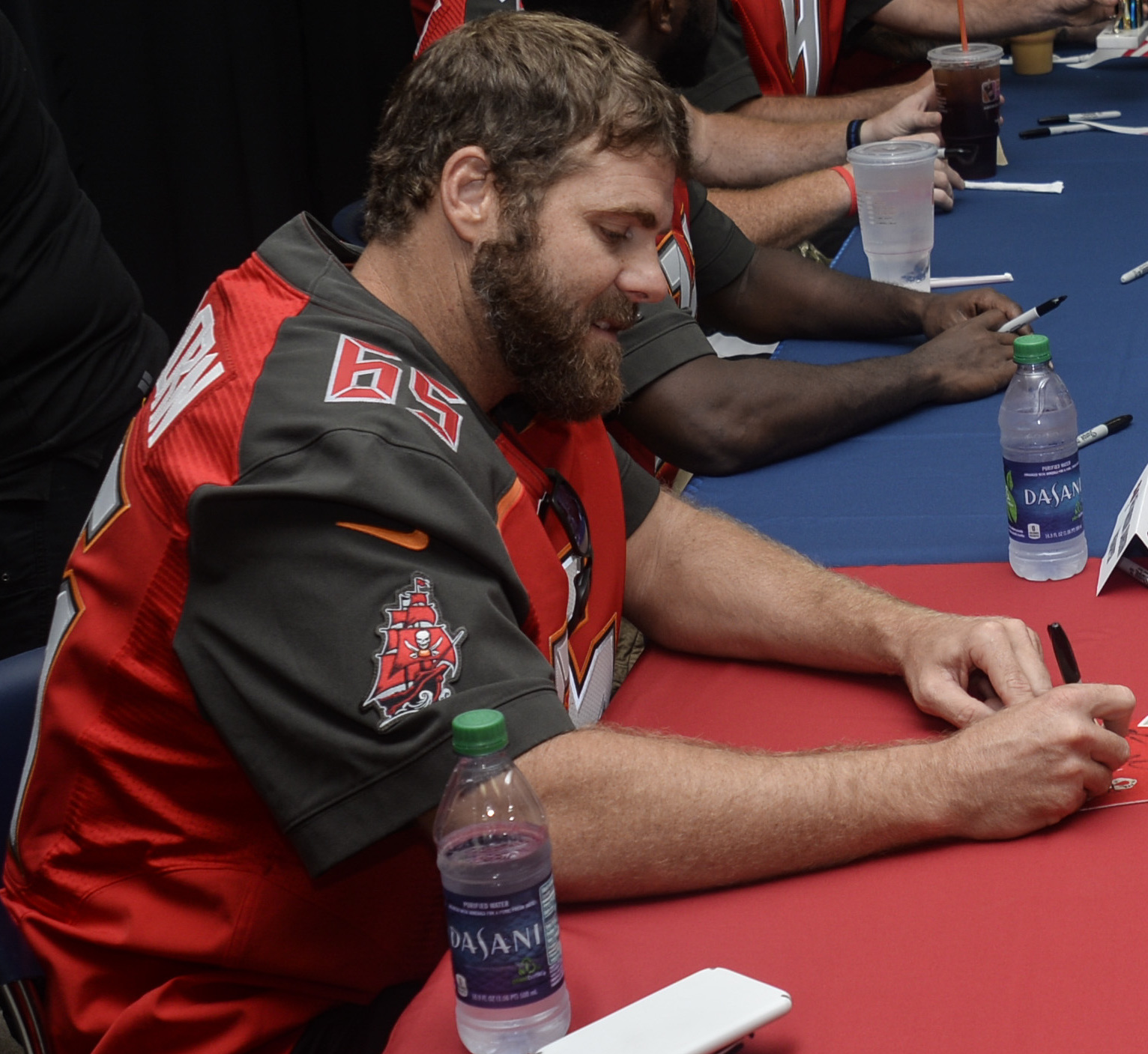
- Sanborn in 2017

No. 65, 89
- Position: Long snapper

Personal information
- Born: July 31, 1985 (age 41); Tampa, Florida, U.S.
- Listed height: 6 ft 1 in (1.85 m)
- Listed weight: 240 lb (109 kg)

Career information
- High school: Jesuit (Tampa)
- College: Florida State
- NFL draft: 2009: undrafted

Career history
- Buffalo Bills (2009–2016); Tampa Bay Buccaneers (2017–2018); San Francisco 49ers (2019); Tampa Bay Buccaneers (2020–2021)*; Jacksonville Jaguars (2022)*
- * Offseason or practice squad member only

Awards and highlights
- Super Bowl champion (LV)

Career NFL statistics
- Games played: 159
- Total tackles: 15
- Fumble recoveries: 1
- Stats at Pro Football Reference

Garrison Sanborn (born July 31, 1985) is an American former professional football player who was a long snapper in the National Football League (NFL). He was signed by the Buffalo Bills as an undrafted free agent in 2009. He played college football for the Florida State Seminoles.

== Early life ==
Sanborn graduated from Tampa Jesuit in 2003 and lettered three years in football as a long snapper, linebacker (junior year) and center (senior year). He won the district championship all three years and advanced to the state semifinals as a senior. He also lettered for four years as a wrestler. His team won wrestling district titles in all four years and won the regional title and placed sixth in the state meet as a senior in the 189-pound class. He married Tara Sanborn in 2011, whom he met at Florida State University. They are united in their Catholic faith.

== College career ==
Sanborn played for Florida State from 2003 to 2007. He was redshirted in 2003.

== Professional career ==
=== Buffalo Bills ===
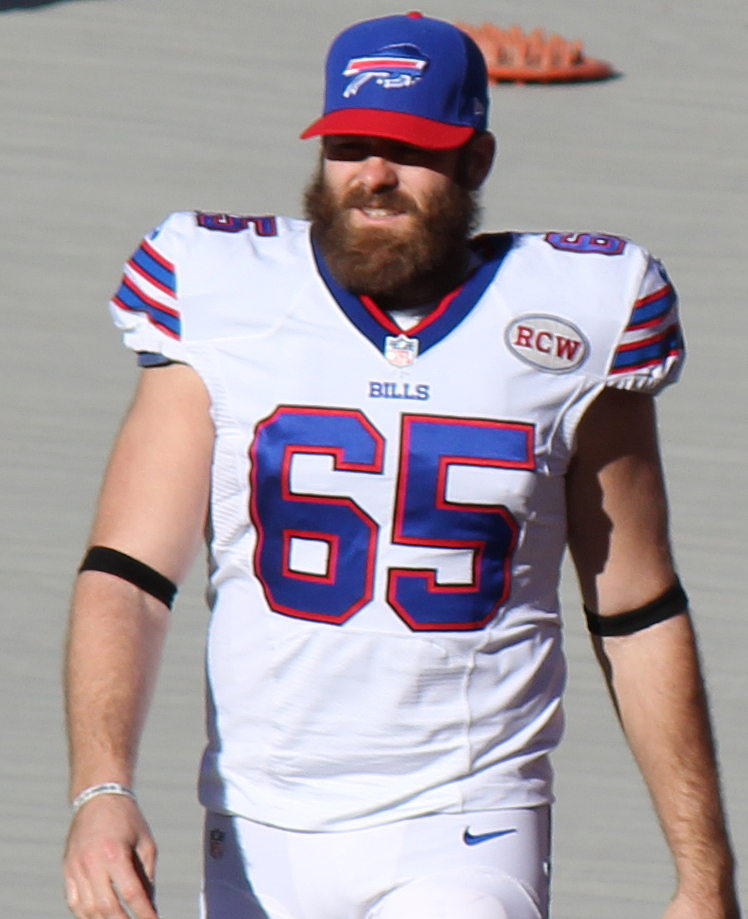
Sanborn playing for the Bills in 2014.

Sanborn signed with the Buffalo Bills as an undrafted free agent in 2009. One of the most consistent in the NFL, Sanborn was among the highest paid long snappers. He signed a three-year deal prior to the 2014 season.

On March 6, 2017, Sanborn was released by the Bills.

=== Tampa Bay Buccaneers ===
On March 14, 2017, Sanborn signed with the Tampa Bay Buccaneers. On September 2, 2017, he was released in the final roster cuts at the end of the preseason, but was re-signed two days later.

On August 26, 2018, Sanborn was re-signed by the Buccaneers.

=== San Francisco 49ers ===
On September 23, 2019, Sanborn was signed by the San Francisco 49ers. He was released on October 23.

=== Tampa Bay Buccaneers ===
On December 18, 2020, Sanborn signed with the practice squad of the Tampa Bay Buccaneers. His practice squad contract with the team expired after the season on February 16, 2021.

On December 7, 2021, Sanborn was signed to the Buccaneers practice squad. He was released on December 13.

=== Jacksonville Jaguars ===
On December 28, 2022, Sanborn was signed to the Jacksonville Jaguars practice squad.
