= Danny Batten =

American football player (born 1987)

No. 57
- Position: Defensive end

Personal information
- Born: December 8, 1987 (age 38); Gilbert, Arizona, U.S.
- Listed height: 6 ft 4 in (1.93 m)
- Listed weight: 250 lb (113 kg)

Career information
- High school: Mesquite (Gilbert)
- College: South Dakota State
- NFL draft: 2010: 6th round, 192nd overall pick

Career history
- Buffalo Bills (2010–2011)

Career NFL statistics
- Total tackles: 25
- Sacks: 0.5
- Fumble recoveries: 1
- Stats at Pro Football Reference

Danny Batten (born December 8, 1987) is an American former professional football player who was a defensive end for the Buffalo Bills of the National Football League (NFL). He played college football for the South Dakota State Jackrabbits and was selected by the Bills in the sixth round of the 2010 NFL draft.

== College career ==
Batten played in all 46 games at defensive end in his four years at South Dakota State University, starting 45 of the games. In 2009, his senior season, he was named the Missouri Valley Football Conference Co-Defensive Player of the Year after finishing with 86 tackles, 9 sacks, and 25 QB pressures.

== Professional career ==
The first Jackrabbit to be drafted since Steve Heiden was selected in 1999 NFL draft, Batten signed a four-year deal with the Bills on June 3, 2010. He had switched from defensive end to outside linebacker with the Bills. On August 22, he was placed on Injured Reserve with a shoulder injury, effectively ending his rookie season.

He was released by the Bills on August 26, 2012.
