= Torell Troup =

American football player (born 1987)

No. 96, 98
- Position: Defensive tackle

Personal information
- Born: June 23, 1988 (age 38); Detroit, Michigan, U.S.
- Listed height: 6 ft 3 in (1.91 m)
- Listed weight: 327 lb (148 kg)

Career information
- High school: Salem (Conyers, Georgia)
- College: UCF
- NFL draft: 2010: 2nd round, 41st overall pick

Career history
- Buffalo Bills (2010−2013); Oakland Raiders (2014)*
- * Offseason or practice squad member only

Awards and highlights
- 2× Second-team All-Conference USA (2008, 2009)

Career NFL statistics
- Total tackles: 31
- Stats at Pro Football Reference

Torell Troup (born June 23, 1988) is an American former professional football player who was a defensive tackle in the National Football League (NFL). He played college football for the UCF Knights and was selected by the Buffalo Bills in the second round of the 2010 NFL draft.

== Early life ==
Troup attended Salem High School in Conyers, Georgia, where he was a two-time first-team all-state performer as a junior and senior. He finished his senior season with 96 total tackles (50 solo stops), six tackles for loss, and three quarterback sacks.

Considered a two-star recruit by Rivals.com, Troup was not listed among the top defensive tackle prospects in 2006. He chose Central Florida over Minnesota, Maryland, and Ole Miss.

== College career ==
As a true freshman at the University of Central Florida, Troup saw action in nine games, including three starts at defensive tackle. By his sophomore season he had established himself as a key part of the rotation and started 11 of 14 games on the defensive line.

In his junior season, Troup earned All-Conference USA Second Team honors, after starting all 12 games and logging 52 tackles, 12.5 tackles for a loss (2nd on the team), and two sacks. A team captain in his senior year, he started all 13 games and helped the Knights lead Conference USA in rushing defense for the second consecutive season and post C-USA's top total defense.

== Professional career ==
Pre-draft measurables
Height	Weight	Arm length	Hand span	40-yard dash	10-yard split	20-yard split	20-yard shuttle	Three-cone drill	Vertical jump	Broad jump	Bench press
6 ft 2 5/8 in (1.90 m)	314 lb (142 kg)	34 in (0.86 m)	9 7/8 in (0.25 m)	5.12 s	1.75 s	2.84 s	4.73 s	7.61 s	29 in (0.74 m)	8 ft 2 in (2.49 m)	34 reps
All values from NFL Combine.

=== Buffalo Bills ===
Troup was selected by the Buffalo Bills in the second round (41st overall) of the 2010 NFL draft. Troup was placed on injured reserve on August 23, 2012. He was released by the Buffalo Bills on August 31, 2013.

=== Oakland Raiders ===
Troup was signed by the Oakland Raiders as a reserve/future free agent on January 2, 2014. The Raiders released Troup on August 24, 2014.

== Personal life ==
Troup is the son of Tory Troup and Lashana Johnson-Troup. He played under the name Torell Johnson during his high school career and his first two seasons at Central Florida.
