= 2006 Buffalo Bills season =

47th season in franchise history

- Owner: Ralph Wilson
- General manager: Marv Levy
- Head coach: Dick Jauron
- Home stadium: Ralph Wilson Stadium

Results
- Record: 7–9
- Division place: 3rd AFC East
- Playoffs: Did not qualify
- Pro Bowlers: DE Aaron Schobel; P Brian Moorman

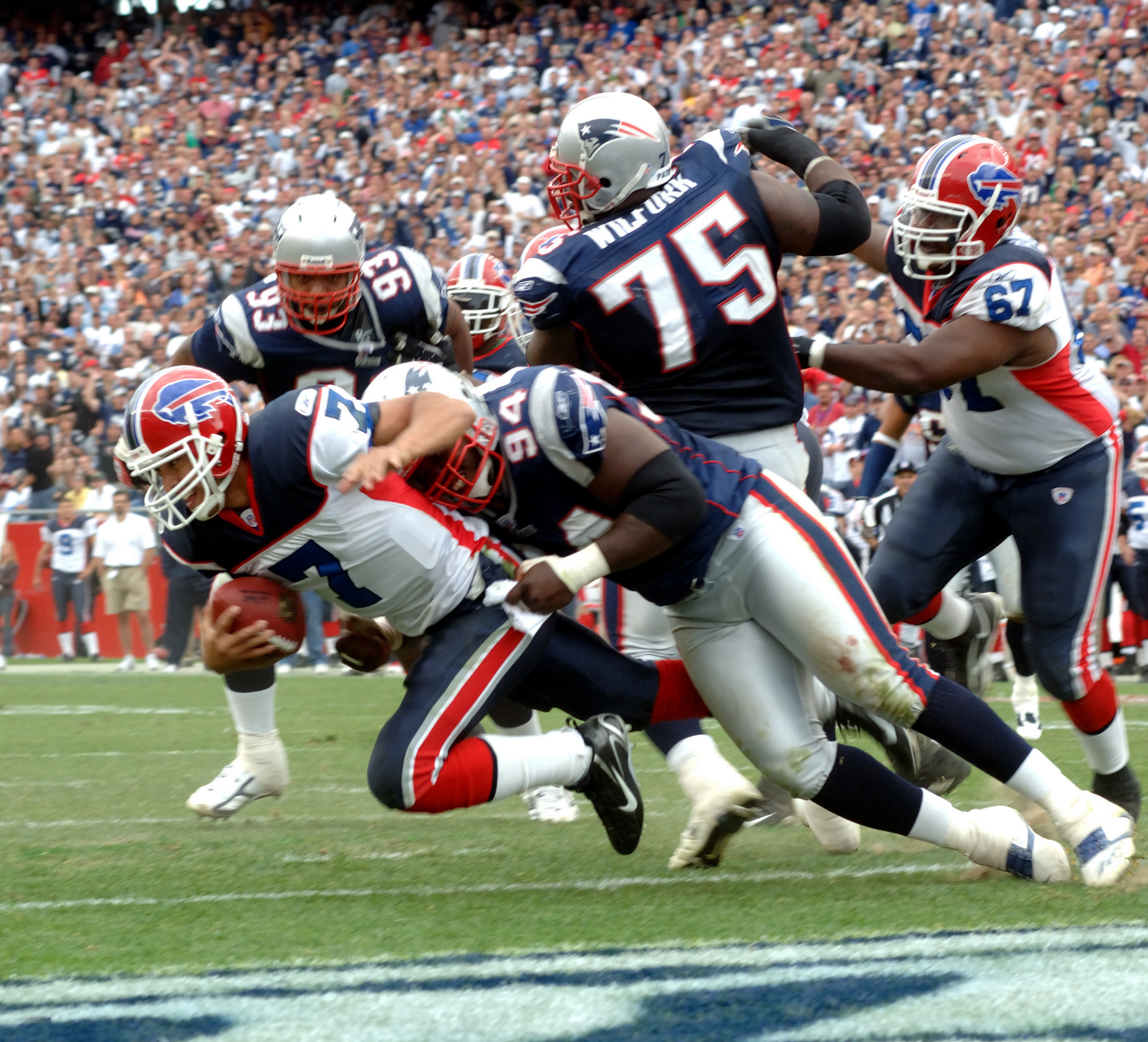
Bills QB J. P. Losman gets tackled by New England's Ty Warren for a safety, week 1.

The 2006 Buffalo Bills season was the franchise's 47th season as a football team, 37th in the National Football League (NFL) and first under both general manager Marv Levy and head coach Dick Jauron. Levy, who previously coached the team from 1986 to 1997, leading them to four straight AFC Championships and four straight Super Bowl appearances from 1990 to 1993, replaced Tom Donahoe, who was fired shortly after the end of the 2005 season, with hopes that his 11 full seasons as Bills head coach would improve a franchise that failed to make the playoffs during Donahoe's tenure. Jauron, who previously coached the Chicago Bears from 1999 to 2003, replaced Mike Mularkey, who resigned shortly after Donahoe's firing, citing family reasons and disagreement over the direction of the organization.

The Bills hoped to improve on their 5–11 record from 2005, while also hoping to make the playoffs for the first time since 1999, but a 30–29 loss to the Tennessee Titans eliminated the team from playoff contention, extending their playoff drought to seven straight seasons, tying a record set from 1967–1973. For the second consecutive season, the Bills' opening day starting quarterback was J. P. Losman.

== NFL draft ==
2006 Buffalo Bills draft
| Round | Pick | Player | Position | College | Notes |
| 1 | 8 | Donte Whitner * | S | Ohio State | |
| 1 | 26 | John McCargo | DT | NC State | Pick from CHI |
| 3 | 70 | Ashton Youboty | CB | Ohio State | |
| 4 | 105 | Ko Simpson | S | South Carolina | |
| 5 | 134 | Kyle Williams * | DT | LSU | |
| 5 | 143 | Brad Butler | OT | Virginia | |
| 6 | 178 | Keith Ellison | LB | Oregon State | |
| 7 | 216 | Terrance Pennington | OT | New Mexico | |
| 7 | 248 | Aaron Merz | OG | California | |
Made roster † Pro Football Hall of Fame * Made at least one Pro Bowl during career

Notes

- The Bills acquired an additional first-round selection (26th overall), later revealed to be John McCargo, as part of a draft-day trade that sent their second-round pick (42nd overall), later revealed to be Danieal Manning, to the Chicago Bears.

== Staff ==
2006 Buffalo Bills staff
| Front office: Owner/CEO/President – Ralph Wilson; General Manager – Marv Levy; Executive Vice President of Business Operations – Russ Brandon; Vice President of Football Administration – Jim Overdorf; Assistant General Manager – Tom Modrak; VP/Assistant Director of College and Pro Scouting – Linda Bogdan; Director of Pro Personnel – John Guy; Coordinator of College Scouting – Doug Majeski; Head coaches: Head Coach – Dick Jauron; Assistant Head Coach/Special Teams – Bobby April; Offensive coaches: Offensive Coordinator – Steve Fairchild; Quarterbacks – Turk Schonert; Running Backs – Eric Studesville; Wide Receivers – Tyke Tolbert; Tight Ends – Charlie Coiner; Offensive Line – Jim McNally; Offensive Line – Larry Zierlein; Offensive Quality Control – Alex Van Pelt | Defensive coaches: Defensive Coordinator – Perry Fewell; Defensive Line – Bill Kollar; Linebackers – Matt Sheldon; Defensive Backs – George Catavolos; Defensive Assistant – DeMontie Cross; Defensive Assistant/Coaching Operations – Chuck Lester; Special teams coaches: Special Teams Assistant – DeMontie Cross; Strength and conditioning: Strength and Conditioning – John Allaire; Assistant Strength and Conditioning – Sean Hayes |

== Roster ==
2006 Buffalo Bills roster
| Quarterbacks (QB): 10 Kelly Holcomb; 7 J. P. Losman; 16 Craig Nall; Running backs (RB): 21 Willis McGahee; 28 Anthony Thomas; 36 Shaud Williams; Wide receivers (WR): 89 Sam Aiken; 18 André Davis KR; 83 Lee Evans; 11 Roscoe Parrish PR; 81 Peerless Price; 82 Josh Reed; 15 George Wilson; Tight ends (TE): 86 Brad Cieslak; 85 Kevin Everett; 87 Matt Murphy; 84 Robert Royal | Offensive linemen (OL): 60 Brad Butler T; 67 Melvin Fowler C; 69 Mike Gandy G/T; 62 Aaron Merz G; 79 Terrance Pennington T; 71 Jason Peters T; 75 Duke Preston G; 76 Tutan Reyes G; Defensive linemen (DL): 77 Tim Anderson DT; 92 Ryan Denney DE; 93 Anthony Hargrove DE; 99 Jason Jefferson DT; 90 Chris Kelsay DE; 91 Eric Powell DE; 94 Aaron Schobel DE; 98 Larry Tripplett DT; 95 Kyle Williams DT | Linebackers (LB): 96 John DiGiorgio MLB; 56 Keith Ellison OLB; 59 London Fletcher MLB; 53 Mario Haggan OLB; 52 Roy Manning OLB; 51 Takeo Spikes OLB; Defensive backs (DB): 41 Matt Bowen FS; 22 Nate Clements CB; 33 Jabari Greer CB; 42 Jim Leonhard SS/PR; 24 Terrence McGee CB/KR; 30 Ko Simpson FS; 25 Kiwaukee Thomas CB; 20 Donte Whitner SS; 27 Coy Wire SS; 26 Ashton Youboty CB; Special teams (ST): 9 Rian Lindell K; 8 Brian Moorman P; 46 Mike Schneck LS | Practice squad: 43 Eric Bassey S; 17 Troy Bergeron WR; 65 Randy Hand T; 50 Kevin Harrison LB; 45 Fred Jackson RB; 72 Ryan Neill LS; 70 Walter Stith T; Reserve: 55 Angelo Crowell LB (IR); 97 John McCargo DT (IR); – Matt Morgan T (IR); 88 Ryan Neufeld TE (IR); – Joe Odom LB (IR); 31 Daimon Shelton FB (IR); 57 Josh Stamer LB (IR); 58 Chris Villarrial G (IR); Rookies in italics 53 active, 8 reserve, 7 practice squad |

== Schedule ==
=== Preseason ===
| Week | Date | Opponent | Result | Record | Venue | Recap |
|---|---|---|---|---|---|---|
| 1 | August 12 | at Carolina Panthers | **L** 13–14 | 0–1 | Bank of America Stadium | Recap |
| 2 | August 18 | Cincinnati Bengals | **L** 16–20 | 0–2 | Ralph Wilson Stadium | Recap |
| 3 | August 26 | Cleveland Browns | **L** 17–20 | 0–3 | Ralph Wilson Stadium | Recap |
| 4 | August 31 | at Detroit Lions | **W** 20–13 | 1–3 | Ford Field | Recap |

=== Regular season ===
| Week | Date | Opponent | Result | Record | Venue | Recap |
|---|---|---|---|---|---|---|
| 1 | September 10 | at **New England Patriots** | **L** 17–19 | 0–1 | Gillette Stadium | Recap |
| 2 | September 17 | at **Miami Dolphins** | **W** 16–6 | 1–1 | Dolphin Stadium | Recap |
| 3 | September 24 | **New York Jets** | **L** 20–28 | 1–2 | Ralph Wilson Stadium | Recap |
| 4 | October 1 | Minnesota Vikings | **W** 17–12 | 2–2 | Ralph Wilson Stadium | Recap |
| 5 | October 8 | at Chicago Bears | **L** 7–40 | 2–3 | Soldier Field | Recap |
| 6 | October 15 | at Detroit Lions | **L** 17–20 | 2–4 | Ford Field | Recap |
| 7 | October 22 | **New England Patriots** | **L** 6–28 | 2–5 | Ralph Wilson Stadium | Recap |
| 8 | Bye | | | | | |
| 9 | November 5 | Green Bay Packers | **W** 24–10 | 3–5 | Ralph Wilson Stadium | Recap |
| 10 | November 12 | at Indianapolis Colts | **L** 16–17 | 3–6 | RCA Dome | Recap |
| 11 | November 19 | at Houston Texans | **W** 24–21 | 4–6 | Reliant Stadium | Recap |
| 12 | November 26 | Jacksonville Jaguars | **W** 27–24 | 5–6 | Ralph Wilson Stadium | Recap |
| 13 | December 3 | San Diego Chargers | **L** 21–24 | 5–7 | Ralph Wilson Stadium | Recap |
| 14 | December 10 | at **New York Jets** | **W** 31–13 | 6–7 | Giants Stadium | Recap |
| 15 | December 17 | **Miami Dolphins** | **W** 21–0 | 7–7 | Ralph Wilson Stadium | Recap |
| 16 | December 24 | Tennessee Titans | **L** 29–30 | 7–8 | Ralph Wilson Stadium | Recap |
| 17 | December 31 | at Baltimore Ravens | **L** 7–19 | 7–9 | M&T Bank Stadium | Recap |

Note: Intra-division opponents are in bold text.

== Game summaries ==
=== Week 1: at New England Patriots ===
Week One: Buffalo Bills at New England Patriots – Game summary

| Quarter | 1 | 2 | 3 | 4 | Total |
|---|---|---|---|---|---|
| Bills | 10 | 7 | 0 | 0 | 17 |
| Patriots | 7 | 0 | 7 | 5 | 19 |

at Gillette Stadium, Foxborough, Massachusetts

- Date: September 10
- Game time: 1:00pm EDT
- Game weather: 63 °F (17 °C), overcast
- Game attendance: 68,756
- Referee: Terry McAulay
- TV announcers (CBS): Jim Nantz (play-by-play) and Phil Simms (color commentator)
- Recap

Game information

First quarter

- BUF – London Fletcher-Baker 5-yard fumble return (Rian Lindell kick), 14:55. Bills 7–0.
- NE – Troy Brown 9-yard pass from Tom Brady (Stephen Gostkowski kick), 10:47. Tie 7–7. Drive: 9 plays, 80 yards, 4:05.
- BUF – Lindell 53-yard FG, 4:20. Bills 10–7. Drive: 11 plays, 48 yards, 6:23.

Second quarter

- BUF – Anthony Thomas 18-yard run (Lindell kick), 11:40. Bills 17–7. Drive: 9 plays, 73 yards, 5:18.

Third quarter

- NE – Kevin Faulk 33-yard pass from Tom Brady (Gostkowski kick), 2:52. Bills 17–14. Drive: 12 plays, 93 yards, 6:32.

Fourth quarter

- NE – Gostkowski 32-yard FG, 9:33. Tie 17–17. Drive: 14 plays, 63 yards, 6:32.
- NE – Ty Warren 8-yard sack for safety, 8:33. Patriots 19–17. Drive: 3 plays, −9 yards, 1:00.

Top passers

- BUF – J. P. Losman – 15/23, 164 yds
- NE – Tom Brady – 11/23, 163 yds, 2 TD

Top rushers

- BUF – Willis McGahee – 20 rush, 70 yds
- NE – Laurence Maroney – 17 rush, 86 yds

Top receivers

- BUF – Josh Reed – 3 rec, 40 yds
- NE – Benjamin Watson – 3 rec, 50 yds

The Bills opened the regular season on the road for the first time since 1999, against the first of their three divisional rivals, the New England Patriots and got off to a fast start, as on the very first play, Takeo Spikes sacked Tom Brady, causing a fumble recovered by London Fletcher-Baker for a 5-yard TD. The Patriots tied the game up at 7–7 on a 9-yard pass from Brady to Troy Brown. The Bills would regain the lead on a 53-yard FG by Rian Lindell. In the second quarter, Anthony Thomas would make the score 17–7 at halftime with an 18-yard run. However, the Bills continued their late-game struggles from 2005, as they gave up 12 unanswered points in the second half (a 17-yard pass from Brady to Kevin Faulk, a 32-yard FG by Stephen Gostkowski and a safety by Ty Warren with 8:33 remaining in the fourth quarter), dropping the Bills to 0–1 to start the season.

=== Week 2: at Miami Dolphins ===
Week Two: Buffalo Bills at Miami Dolphins – Game summary

| Quarter | 1 | 2 | 3 | 4 | Total |
|---|---|---|---|---|---|
| Bills | 3 | 0 | 13 | 0 | 16 |
| Dolphins | 0 | 0 | 0 | 6 | 6 |

at Dolphin Stadium, Miami Gardens, Florida

- Date: September 17
- Game time: 1:00pm EDT
- Game weather: 88 °F (31 °C), mostly cloudy
- Game attendance: 72,797
- Referee: Walt Anderson
- TV announcers (CBS): Greg Gumbel and Dan Dierdorf
- Recap

Game information

First quarter

- BUF – Rian Lindell 33-yard FG, 2:36. Bills 3–0. Drive: 10 plays, 49 yards, 5:46.

Second quarter

- No scoring plays

Third quarter

- BUF – Josh Reed 4-yard pass from J. P. Losman (Lindell kick), 10:09. Bills 10–0. Drive: 8 plays, 72 yards, 4:51.
- BUF – Lindell 45-yard FG, 3:54. Bills 13–0. Drive: 8 plays, 29 yards, 4:47.
- BUF – Lindell 43-yard FG, 0:48. Bills 16–0. Drive: 4 plays, −8 yards, 1:04.

Fourth quarter

- MIA – Chris Chambers 23-yard pass from Daunte Culpepper (pass failed), 1:52. Bills 16–7. Drive: 11 plays, 93 yards, 2:53.

Top passers

- MIA – Daunte Culpepper – 19/29, 183 yards, TD, INT
- BUF – J. P. Losman – 22/38, 328 yards, TD

Top rushers

- MIA – Ronnie Brown – 15 rush, 70 yds
- BUF – Willis McGahee – 26 rush, 150 yds

Top receivers

- MIA – Chris Chambers – 4 rec, 55 yds, TD
- BUF – Josh Reed – 4 rec, 39 yards, TD

For Week 2, the Bills traveled to Dolphin Stadium to take on the second of their three divisional rivals, the Miami Dolphins. The Bills managed to get the only score of the first half, a 33-yard field goal by kicker Rian Lindell in the first quarter. It wasn't until the third quarter that the Bills were to score again when quarterback J. P. Losman threw a 4-yard pass to Josh Reed, while Lindell kicked a pair of FGs, a 45-yarder and a 43-yarder. Even though the Dolphins did manage to score in the fourth quarter on a 23-yard pass from Daunte Culpepper to Chris Chambers (with a failed 2-point conversion), the Bills defense dominated the game, sacking Culpepper seven times (along with two forced fumbles) and blocking a punt, improving the Bills to 1–1.

=== Week 3: vs. New York Jets ===
Week Three: New York Jets at Buffalo Bills – Game summary

| Quarter | 1 | 2 | 3 | 4 | Total |
|---|---|---|---|---|---|
| Jets | 0 | 14 | 7 | 7 | 28 |
| Bills | 7 | 3 | 0 | 10 | 20 |

at Ralph Wilson Stadium, Orchard Park, New York

- Date: September 24
- Game time: 1:00pm EDT
- Game weather: 66 °F (19 °C), mostly cloudy
- Game attendance: 72,067
- Referee: Jerome Boger
- TV announcers (CBS): Dick Enberg and Randy Cross
- Recap

Game information

First quarter

- BUF – Roscoe Parrish 51-yard pass from J. P. Losman (Rian Lindell kick), 14:05. Bills 7–0. Drive: 2 plays, 69 yards, 0:55.

Second quarter

- NYJ – Kevan Barlow 3-yard run (Mike Nugent kick), 10:17. Tie 7–7. Drive: 7 plays, 74 yards, 3:10.
- BUF – Lindell 36-yard FG, 0:52. Bills 10–7. Drive: 7 plays, 50 yards, 3:25.
- NYJ – Chris Baker 1-yard pass from Chad Pennington (Nugent kick), 0:14. Jets 14–10. Drive: 10 plays, 67 yards, 2:29.

Third quarter

- NYJ – Victor Hobson 32-yard fumble return (Nugent kick), 10:05. Jets 21–10.

Fourth quarter

- BUF – Lindell 28-yard FG, 9:14. Jets 21–13. Drive: 9 plays, 77 yards, 4:50.
- NYJ – Cedric Houston 5-yard run (Nugent kick), 3:20. Jets 28–13. Drive: 9 plays, 58 yards, 5:54.
- BUF – Losman 12-yard run (Lindell kick), 1:15. Jets 28–20. Drive: 10 plays, 77 yards, 2:05.

Top passers

- NYJ – Chad Pennington – 19/29, 183 yards, TD
- BUF – J. P. Losman – 22/38, 328 yards, TD, INT

Top rushers

- NYJ – Kevan Barlow – 12 rush, 31 yds, TD
- BUF – Willis McGahee – 26 rush, 150 yds

Top receivers

- NYJ – Laveranues Coles – 10 rec, 78 yds
- BUF – Lee Evans – 8 rec, 107 yards, TD

Dressed up in their 1960s throwback jerseys, the Bills played their Week 3 home-opener against their last divisional rival, the New York Jets. Buffalo started off with J. P. Losman throwing a 51-yard pass to Roscoe Parrish for the only score in the first quarter. In the second quarter, the Jets tied the game up with a 3-yard run by Kevan Barlow. The Bills managed to get a 36-yard FG by Rian Lindell, but the Jets managed to take the lead, as Chad Pennington completed a 1-yard TD pass to Chris Baker within the closing seconds of the half. In the second half, the Bills fell behind as Victor Hobson returned a Buffalo fumble 32 yards for a touchdown, which would be the only score of the third quarter. In the fourth quarter, the Bills tried to close the gap, as Lindell kicked a 28-yard field goal. However, the Jets increased their lead with Cedric Houston getting a 5-yard run. The Bills would get another score, though—a 12-yard Losman run. Even though the Bills recovered their onside kick, they went three-and-out to end any more scoring threats, dropping to 1–2.

=== Week 4: Minnesota Vikings ===
Week Four: Minnesota Vikings at Buffalo Bills – Game summary

| Quarter | 1 | 2 | 3 | 4 | Total |
|---|---|---|---|---|---|
| Vikings | 3 | 3 | 0 | 6 | 12 |
| Bills | 0 | 7 | 7 | 3 | 17 |

at Ralph Wilson Stadium, Orchard Park, New York

- Date: October 1
- Game time: 1:00pm EDT
- Game weather: 59 °F (15 °C), mostly cloudy
- Game attendance: 71,972
- Referee: Ron Winter
- TV announcers (Fox): Ron Pitts and Terry Donahue
- Recap

Game information

First quarter

- MIN – Ryan Longwell 37-yard FG, 8:40. Vikings 3–0. Drive: 12 plays, 61 yards, 6:20.

Second quarter

- BUF – Willis McGahee 1-yard run (Rian Lindell kick), 13:08. Bills 7–3. Drive: 12 plays, 79 yards, 7:21.
- MIN – Longwell 34-yard FG, 0:00. Bills 7–6. Drive: 6 plays, 35 yards, 0:42.

Third quarter

- BUF – Peerless Price 8-yard pass from Losman (Lindell kick), 9:12. Bills 14–6. Drive: 11 plays, 70 yards, 5:48.

Fourth quarter

- BUF – Lindell 28-yard FG, 14:05. Bills 14–6. Drive: 10 plays, 22 yards, 5:44.
- MIN – Marcus Robinson 29-yard pass from Brad Johnson (pass failed), 3:07. Bills 14–12. Drive: 7 plays, 55 yards, 1:03.

Top passers

- MIN – Brad Johnson – 25/44, 267 yds, TD, 2 INT
- BUF – J. P. Losman – 23/32, 224 yds, TD

Top rushers

- MIN – Chester Taylor – 10 rush, 23 yds
- BUF – Willis McGahee – 28 rush, 78 yds

Top receivers

- MIN – Marcus Robinson – 5 rec, 78 yds, TD
- BUF – Lee Evans – 7 rec, 92 yds

Looking to bounce back from a tough home-opening loss to the New York Jets, the Bills took on the first of their four NFC North rivals, the Minnesota Vikings. In the first quarter, Buffalo got a small deficit as kicker Ryan Longwell kicked a 37-yard FG for the only score of the quarter. In the second quarter, the Bills scored on a Willis McGahee 1-yard run. Afterwards, Minnesota got a last-second FG by Longwell, this one from 49 yards out. In the third quarter, Buffalo pulled ahead as J. P. Losman completed an 8-yard pass to Peerless Price for the only score of the period. In the fourth quarter, Rian Lindell kicked a 28-yard FG. However, Brad Johnson completed a 29-yard pass to Marcus Robinson, but Buffalo prevented the two-point conversion and ran the clock out, giving the Bills their first home victory of the year and improving to 2–2.

=== Week 5: at Chicago Bears ===
Week Five: Buffalo Bills at Chicago Bears – Game summary

| Quarter | 1 | 2 | 3 | 4 | Total |
|---|---|---|---|---|---|
| Bills | 0 | 0 | 0 | 7 | 7 |
| Bears | 6 | 21 | 3 | 10 | 40 |

at Soldier Field, Chicago, Illinois

- Date: October 8
- Game time: 1:00pm EDT/12:00pm CDT
- Game weather: 66 °F (19 °C), cloudy
- Game attendance: 62,206
- Referee: Bill Carollo
- TV announcers (CBS): Jim Nantz and Phil Simms
- Recap

Game information

First quarter

- CHI – Robbie Gould 42-yard FG, 9:07. Bears 3–0. Drive: 6 plays, 15 yards, 2:10.
- CHI – Gould 43-yard FG, 3:43. Bears 6–0. Drive: 10 plays, 55 yards, 3:46.

Second quarter

- CHI – Bernard Berrian 8-yard pass from Rex Grossman (Gould kick), 13:01. Bears 13–0. Drive: 7 plays, 49 yards, 4:10.
- CHI – Cedric Benson 1-yard run (Gould kick), 8:30. Bears 20–0. Drive: 5 plays, 32 yards, 2:43.
- CHI – Rashied Davis 15-yard pass from Grossman (Gould kick), 4:22. Bears 27–0. Drive: 4 plays, 70 yards, 1:52.

Third quarter

- CHI – Gould 32-yard FG, 4:18. Bears 30–0. Drive: 9 plays, 43 yards, 4:18.

Fourth quarter

- CHI – Gould 41-yard FG, 6:05. Bears 33–0. Drive: 14 plays, 45 yards, 8:39.
- CHI – Benson 1-yard run (Gould kick), 4:36. Bears 40–0. Drive: 3 plays, 15 yards, 1:19.
- BUF – Lee Evans 5-yard pass from J. P. Losman (Rian Lindell kick), 2:37. Bears 40–7. Drive: 3 plays, 25 yards, 1:04.

Top passers

- BUF – J. P. Losman – 14/27, 115 yds, TD, 3 INT
- CHI – Rex Grossman – 15/27, 182 yds, 2 TD

Top rushers

- BUF – Willis McGahee – 14 rush, 50 yds
- CHI – Thomas Jones – 20 rush, 110 yds

Top receivers

- BUF – Lee Evans – 9 rec, 94 yds, TD
- CHI – Bernard Berrian – 4 rec, 97 yds, TD

Looking for their second road victory of the season, the Bills traveled to Soldier Field to take on the second of their four NFC North rivals, the Chicago Bears, in Dick Jauron's first return to Chicago since being fired at the end of the 2003 Chicago Bears season. From the start, Buffalo was in trouble, as Robbie Gould kicked two FGs in the first quarter—a 42-yarder and a 43-yarder. Then, in the second quarter, three straight scores came from the Bears—an 8-yard pass from Rex Grossman to Bernard Berrian, a 1-yard run from Cedric Benson and a 15-yard pass from Grossman to Rashied Davis—that put the Bills in a deep hole. In the third quarter, Gould put up another FG for Chicago, this time from 32 yards out, while in the fourth quarter, Gould would kick a 41-yard FG and Benson would get another 1-yard run. The Bills would finally get on the board, as J. P. Losman completed a 5-yard strike to Lee Evans, ending the Bears' 11-quarter streak of not allowing their opponents to score a TD going back to the fourth quarter of the Bears' 34–7 victory against the Detroit Lions in Week 2, but the damage was already done, as the loss dropped the Bills to 2–3.

=== Week 6: at Detroit Lions ===
Week Six: Buffalo Bills at Detroit Lions – Game summary

| Quarter | 1 | 2 | 3 | 4 | Total |
|---|---|---|---|---|---|
| Bills | 0 | 10 | 0 | 7 | 17 |
| Lions | 7 | 10 | 0 | 3 | 20 |

at Ford Field, Detroit, Michigan

- Date: October 15
- Game time: 1:00pm EDT
- Game weather: Played indoors (dome stadium)
- Game attendance: 60,704
- Referee: Gene Steratore
- TV announcers (CBS): Gus Johnson and Steve Tasker
- Recap

Game information

First quarter

- DET – Jason Hanson 43-yard FG, 7:05. Lions 3–0. Drive: 7 plays, 26 yards, 2:39.
- DET – Kevin Jones 7-yard run (Hanson kick), 4:35. Lions 10–0. Drive: 3 plays, 24 yards, 1:12.

Second quarter

- BUF – Roscoe Parrish 44-yard pass from J. P. Losman (Rian Lindell kick), 14:11. Lions 10–7. Drive: 4 plays, 54 yards, 1:50.
- DET – Roy Williams 28-yard pass from Jon Kitna (Hanson kick), 0:40. Bills 17–7. Drive: 8 plays, 89 yards, 1:52.
- BUF – Lindell 53-yard FG, 5:54. Bills 17–10. Drive: 3 plays, −12 yards, 0:40.

Third quarter

- No scoring plays

Fourth quarter

- DET – Hanson 29-yard FG, 14:10. Lions 20–10. Drive: 9 plays, 51 yards, 3:43.
- BUF – Ryan Neufeld 4-yard pass from Losman (Lindell kick), 9:23. Lions 20–17. Drive: 9 plays, 74 yards, 4:47.

Top passers

- BUF – J. P. Losman – 21/34, 207 yds, 2 TD, INT
- DET – Jon Kitna – 24/36, 278 yds, TD, INT

Top rushers

- BUF – Willis McGahee – 17 rush, 66 yds
- DET – Kevin Jones – 23 rush, 127 yds, TD

Top receivers

- BUF – Lee Evans – 8 rec, 82 yds
- DET – Roy Williams – 10 rec, 161 yds, TD

The Bills flew to Ford Field to take on the third of their four NFC North rivals, the Detroit Lions. From the start, the winless Lions were dominated the first quarter, as kicker Jason Hanson kicked a 43-yard FG, while Kevin Jones got a 7-yard run. In the second quarter, Buffalo got into the game, as J. P. Losman completed a 44-yard pass to Roscoe Parrish. However, Detroit responded, as Jon Kitna completed a 28-yard TD pass to Roy Williams. The Bills would get kicker Rian Lindell to get a 53-yard field goal to end the half. After a scoreless third quarter, Lions kicker Hanson got a 29-yard field goal, putting Detroit up 20–10. The Bills tried to catch-up, as Losman completed a 4-yard pass to Ryan Neufeld, but the deficit proved to be a little too much, as the Lions ended up getting their first win of the season at the Bills' expense. As of 2026, the Bills haven't lost to the Lions since then.

=== Week 7: vs. New England Patriots ===
Week Seven: New England Patriots at Buffalo Bills – Game summary

| Quarter | 1 | 2 | 3 | 4 | Total |
|---|---|---|---|---|---|
| Patriots | 14 | 0 | 7 | 7 | 28 |
| Bills | 3 | 0 | 0 | 3 | 6 |

at Ralph Wilson Stadium, Orchard Park, New York

- Date: October 22
- Game time: 1:00pm EDT
- Game weather: 50 °F (10 °C), overcast
- Game attendance: 70,442
- Referee: Jeff Triplette
- TV announcers (CBS): Greg Gumbel and Dan Dierdorf
- Recap

Game information

First quarter

- NE – Corey Dillon 8-yard run (Stephen Gostkowski kick), 8:23. Patriots 7–0. Drive: 14 plays, 71 yards, 6:37.
- BUF – Rian Lindell 40-yard FG, 2:24. Patriots 7–3. Drive 9 plays, 58 yards, 5:59.
- NE – Dillon 12-yard run (Gostkowski kick), 1:25. Patriots 14–3. Drive: 4 plays, 21 yards, 1:25.

Second quarter

- No scoring plays

Third quarter

- NE – Chad Jackson 35-yard pass from Brady (Gostkowski kick), 14:00. Patriots 21–3. Drive: 4 plays, 60 yards, 2:08.

Fourth quarter

- BUF – Lindell 46-yard FG, 3:39, Patriots 21–6. Drive: 9 plays, 46 yards, 3:39.
- NE – Doug Gabriel 5-yard pass from Brady (Gostkowski kick), 7:36. Patriots 28–6. Drive: 8 plays, 67 yards, 4:09.

Top passers

- NE – Tom Brady – 18/27, 195 yds, 2 TD
- BUF – J. P. Losman – 16/25, 192 yds, INT

Top rushers

- NE – Corey Dillon – 14 rush, 47 yds, 2 TD
- BUF – Willis McGahee – 20 rush, 59 yds

Top receivers

- NE – Benjamin Watson – 5 rec, 60 yds
- BUF – Willis McGahee – 2 rec, 61 yds

Coming off two straight road losses to an NFC North team, the Bills returned home for a rematch with the New England Patriots. In the first meeting in Week 1, New England came back to win, thanks to late-game struggles by the Bills. This time, however, it wasn't even close. In the first quarter, the Patriots took an early lead with the first of Corey Dillon's two runs, an 8-yarder. Kicker Rian Lindell would get a 40-yard field goal, but the Patriots wouldn't allow Buffalo to score, as Dillon got his second of the game, a 12-yarder. After a scoreless second quarter, the Patriots continued to make the game difficult for the Bills as in the third quarter, Tom Brady threw a 35-yard pass to Chad Jackson for the only score of the period. In the fourth quarter, Lindell would get another field goal, this one from 46 yards out, but the damage was already done, as Brady put the icing on the game with his second pass, this one a 5-yarder to Doug Gabriel, sweeping the Bills for a third-straight year and dropping them to 2–5 heading into the bye week.

=== Week 9: vs. Green Bay Packers ===
Week Nine: Green Bay Packers at Buffalo Bills – Game summary

| Quarter | 1 | 2 | 3 | 4 | Total |
|---|---|---|---|---|---|
| Packers | 0 | 0 | 7 | 3 | 10 |
| Bills | 3 | 7 | 0 | 14 | 24 |

at Ralph Wilson Stadium, Orchard Park, New York

- Date: November 5
- Game time: 1:00pm ET
- Game weather: 48 °F (9 °C), mostly cloudy
- Game attendance: 72,205
- Referee: Walt Coleman
- TV announcers (Fox): Ron Pitts and Terry Donahue
- Recap

Game information

First quarter

- BUF – Rian Lindell 28-yard FG, 11:00. Bills 7–0. Drive: 7 plays, 19 yards, 4:00.

Second quarter

- BUF – London Fletcher-Baker 17-yard INT return (Lindell kick). Bills 10–0.

Third quarter

- GB – Donald Driver 1-yard pass from Brett Favre (Dave Rayner kick), 4:17. Bills 10–7. 'Drive: 10 plays, 65 yards, 5:01.

Fourth quarter

- GB – Rayner 49-yard FG, 12:41. Tie 10–10. Drive: 6 plays, 24 yards, 2:01.
- BUF – Lee Evans 43-yard pass from J. P. Losman (Lindell kick), 8:00. Bills 17–10. Drive: 2 plays, 33 yards, 0:28.
- BUF – Anthony Thomas 14-yard run (Lindell kick), 3:01. Bills 24–10. 'Drive: 3 plays, 27 yards, 1:32.

Top passers

- GB – Brett Favre – 28/47, 287 yds, TD, 2 INT
- BUF – J. P. Losman – 8/15, 102 yds, TD

Top rushers

- GB – Ahman Green – 23 rush, 122 yds
- BUF – Anthony Thomas – 20 rush, 95 yds, TD

Top receivers

- GB – Donald Driver – 9 rec, 96 yds, TD
- BUF – Lee Evans – 2 rec, 58 yds, TD

Coming off their bye week, the Bills stayed home for a Week 9 matchup with their final NFC North rival, the Green Bay Packers. In the first quarter, even though Willis McGahee left with injured ribs, kicker Rian Lindell kicked a 28-yard field goal for the only score of the period. In the second quarter, Buffalo's defense joined in the scoring party as London Fletcher-Baker returned an interception 17 yards for a touchdown for the only score of the period. In the third quarter, Brett Favre hooked up with Donald Driver on a 1-yard pass for the only score of the period. In the fourth quarter, Packers kicker Dave Rayner kicked a 49-yard FG to tie the game up 10–10. The Bills increased their margin as J. P. Losman completed a 43-yard pass to Lee Evans. Afterwards, a 76-yard interception return by Ko Simpson set up a 14-yard run by Anthony Thomas, improving the Bills to 3–5.

=== Week 10: at Indianapolis Colts ===
Week Ten: Buffalo Bills at Indianapolis Colts – Game summary

| Quarter | 1 | 2 | 3 | 4 | Total |
|---|---|---|---|---|---|
| Bills | 3 | 7 | 3 | 3 | 16 |
| Colts | 0 | 10 | 7 | 0 | 17 |

at RCA Dome, Indianapolis, Indiana

- Date: November 12
- Game time: 1:00pm ET
- Game weather: Played indoors (dome stadium)
- Game attendance: 57,306
- Referee: Tony Corrente
- TV announcers (CBS): Dick Enberg and Randy Cross
- Recap

Game information

First quarter

- BUF – Rian Lindell 22-yard FG, 6:52. Bills 3–0. Drive: 14 plays, 61 yards, 8:08.

Second quarter

- IND – Reggie Wayne 1-yard pass from Peyton Manning (Adam Vinatieri kick), 11:09. Colts 7–3. Drive: 9 plays, 58 yards, 5:13.
- IND – Vinatieri 31-yard FG, 2:44. Colts 10–3. Drive: 13 plays, 78 yards, 6:49.
- BUF – Terrence McGee 68-yard fumble return (Lindell kick), 0:31. Tie 10–10.

Third quarter

- IND – Joseph Addai 5-yard run (Vinatieri kick), 10:30. Colts 17–10. Drive: 9 plays, 74 yards, 4:30.
- BUF – Lindell 30-yard FG, 8:47. Colts 17–13. Drive: 4 plays, 0 yards, 1:43.

Fourth quarter

- BUF – Lindell 43-yard FG, 10:35. Colts 17–16. Drive: 9 plays, 36 yards, 4:25.

Top passers

- BUF – J. P. Losman – 8/12, 83 yds
- IND – Peyton Manning – 27/39, 236 yds, TD

Top rushers

- BUF – Anthony Thomas – 28 rush, 109 yds
- IND – Joseph Addai – 13 rush, 78 yds, TD

Top receivers

- BUF – Lee Evans – 5 rec, 70 yds
- IND – Ben Utecht – 7 rec, 66 yds

Fresh off their victory over the Packers, the Bills flew out to the RCA Dome for a Week 10 matchup with the Indianapolis Colts. Much like they did in the season-opener against the Patriots, Buffalo got off to a fast start in the first quarter with kicker Rian Lindell making a 22-yard field goal for the only score of the period. In the second quarter, however, Indianapolis struck back with Peyton Manning completing a 1-yard pass to Reggie Wayne. The Colts would follow that up with kicker Adam Vinatieri kicking a 31-yard FG. The Bills defense did make a stand, though, as Terrence McGee returned a fumble 68 yards for a touchdown. In the third quarter, Indianapolis regained the lead with Joseph Addai completing a 5-yard run. Buffalo would respond with Lindell making a 30-yard FG. In the fourth quarter, the Bills drew closer with Lindell's 43-yard FG and had a chance to take the lead late in the game, let alone win, but a 41-yard try went wide right, not only dropping the Bills to 3–6, but last place in the AFC East.

=== Week 11: at Houston Texans ===
Week Eleven: Buffalo Bills at Houston Texans – Game summary

| Quarter | 1 | 2 | 3 | 4 | Total |
|---|---|---|---|---|---|
| Bills | 14 | 3 | 0 | 7 | 24 |
| Texans | 7 | 7 | 7 | 0 | 21 |

at Reliant Stadium, Houston, Texas

- Date: November 19
- Game time: 1:00pm ET
- Game weather: 63 °F (17 °C), clear
- Game attendance: 70,125
- Referee: Terry McAulay
- TV announcers (CBS): Don Criqui and Steve Beuerlein
- Recap

Game information

First quarter

- BUF – Lee Evans 83-yard pass from J. P. Losman (Rian Lindell kick), 13:34. Bills 7–0. Drive: 3 plays, 87 yards, 1:13.
- BUF – Evans 83-yard pass from Losman (Lindell kick), 6:35. Bills 14–0. Drive: 4 plays, 97 yards, 2:00.
- HOU – Wali Lundy 17-yard run (Kris Brown kick), 3:02. Bills 14–7. Drive: 7 plays, 80 yards, 3:33.

Second quarter

- BUF – Lindell 40-yard FG, 12:13. Bills 17–7. Drive: 12 plays, 51 yards, 5:49.
- HOU – Samkon Gado 1-yard run (Brown kick), 6:01. Bills 17–14. Drive: 11 plays, 70 yards, 6:12.

Third quarter

- HOU – Dunta Robinson 9-yard INT return (Brown kick), 7:02. Texans 21–17.

Fourth quarter

- BUF – Peerless Price 9-yard pass from Losman (Lindell kick), 0:09. Bills 24–21. Drive: 7 plays, 55 yards, 1:35.

Top passers

- BUF – J. P. Losman – 26/38, 340 yds, 3 TD, INT
- HOU – David Carr – 25/30, 223 yds, INT

Top rushers

- BUF – Anthony Thomas – 19 rush, 56 yds
- HOU – Samkon Gado – 10 rush, 69 yds, TD

Top receivers

- BUF – Lee Evans – 11 rec, 265 yds, 2 TD
- HOU – Andre Johnson – 6 rec, 76 yds

This Week 11 matchup against the Texans was expected to be a boring affair, but it was anything but. The first quarter saw a dominating offensive performance by Lee Evans, who caught six passes for 205 yards and a pair of 83-yard touchdowns, falling just five yards short of the NFL mark for most yards receiving in a quarter of 210 set by Qadry Ismail in 1999. However, Houston was not intimidated and kept the game close going into halftime. In the second half, the Bills' offense slowed down greatly, but Houston kept flying, mostly on the arm of David Carr, who tied the NFL record for most consecutive completions in a game with 22. Dunta Robinson intercepted a Losman pass and ran it in for an easy score, giving the Texans a 21–17 edge that held until the final seconds, when Losman led the Bills down the field and hit Peerless Price for the game-winning 9-yard catch in the back of the end zone with 0:09 remaining (the play was reviewed and upheld) for the 24–21 victory in a game where Losman set a career-high for passing yardage with 340 and Evans set a new franchise record with 265 yards receiving. With the win, the Bills improved to 4–6.

The Bills would not defeat the Texans on the road again until 2026.

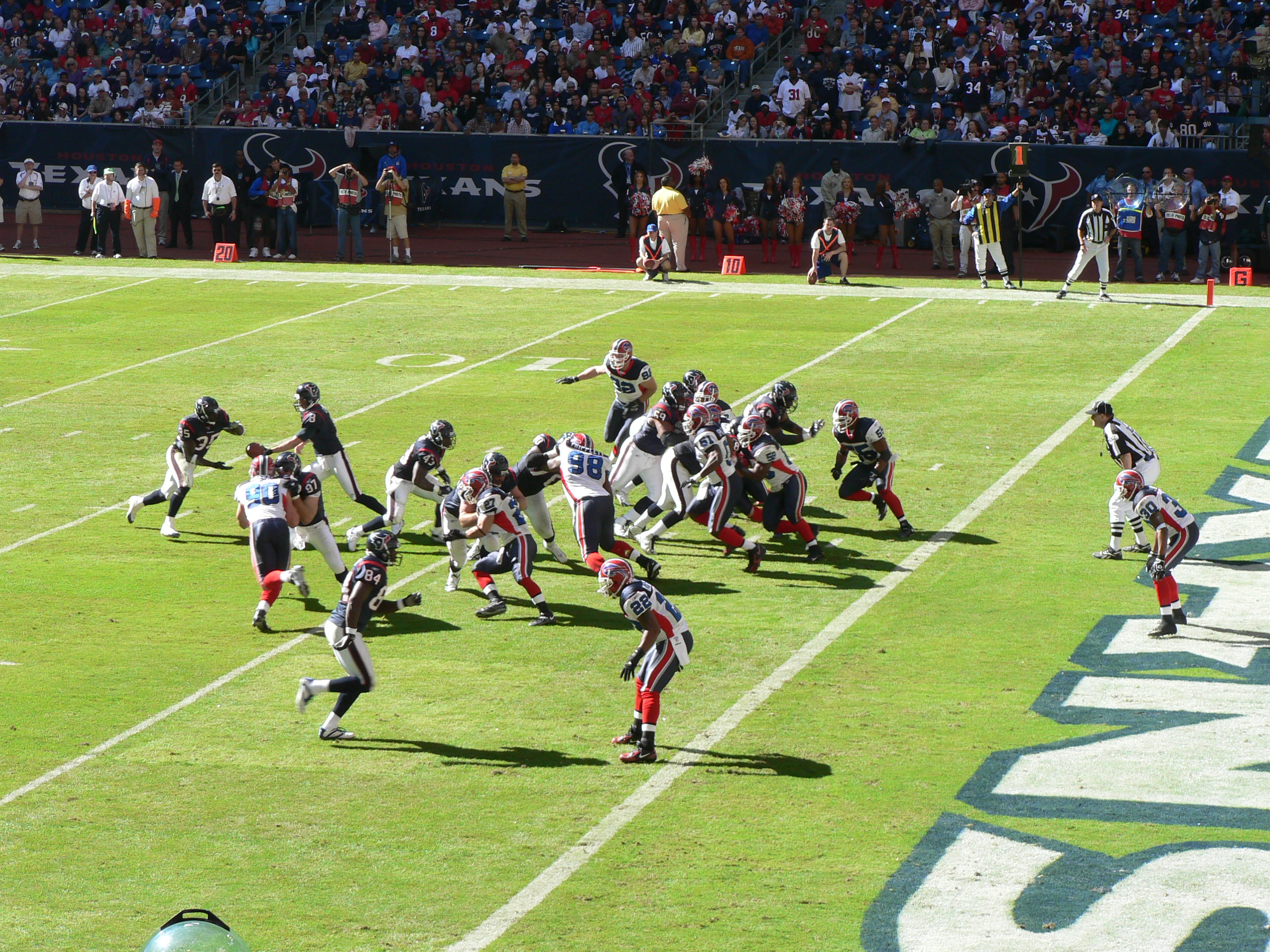
Texans QB David Carr hands off to Samkon Gado.

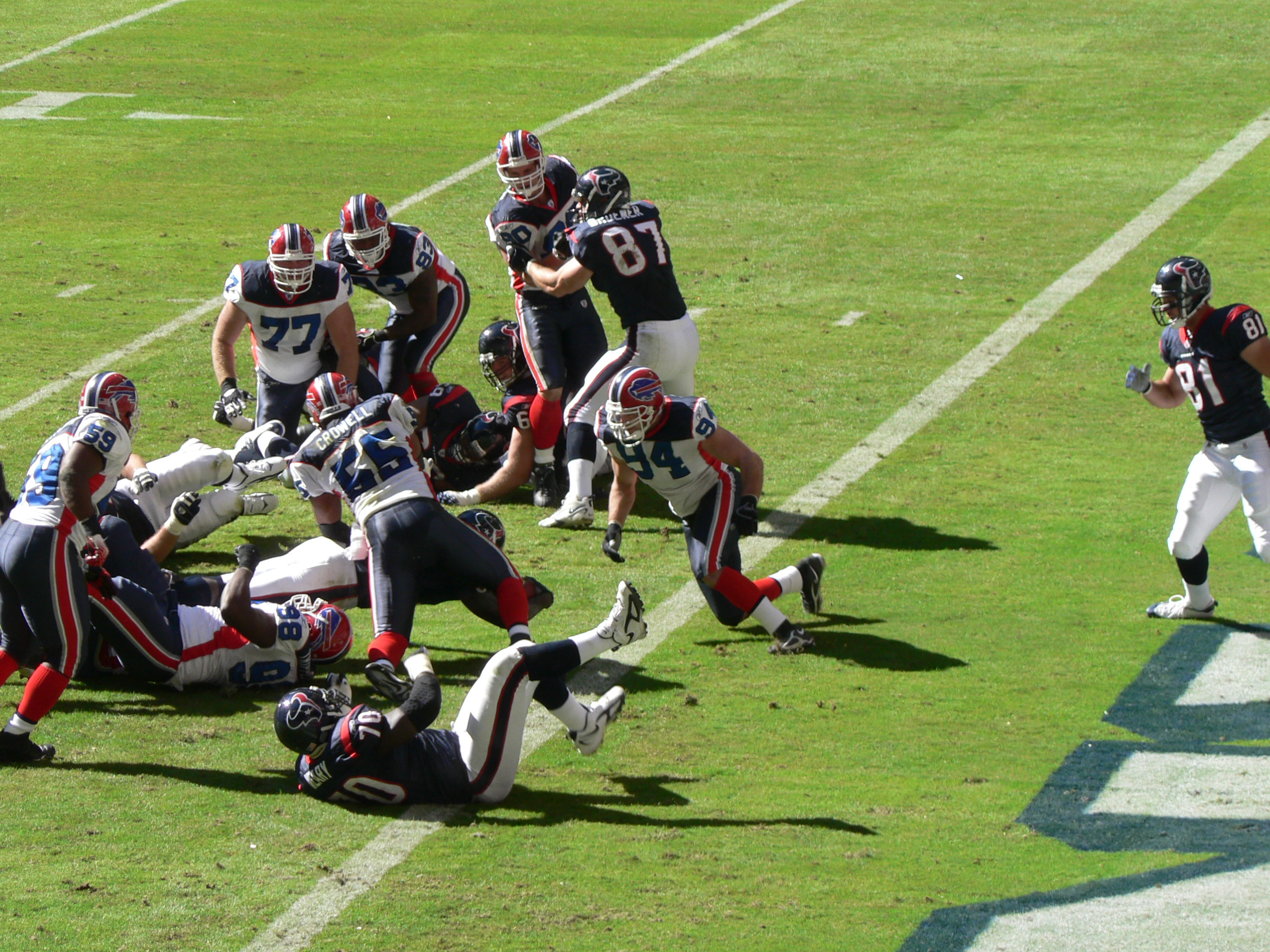
Gado advances to Buffalo's 1-yard line.

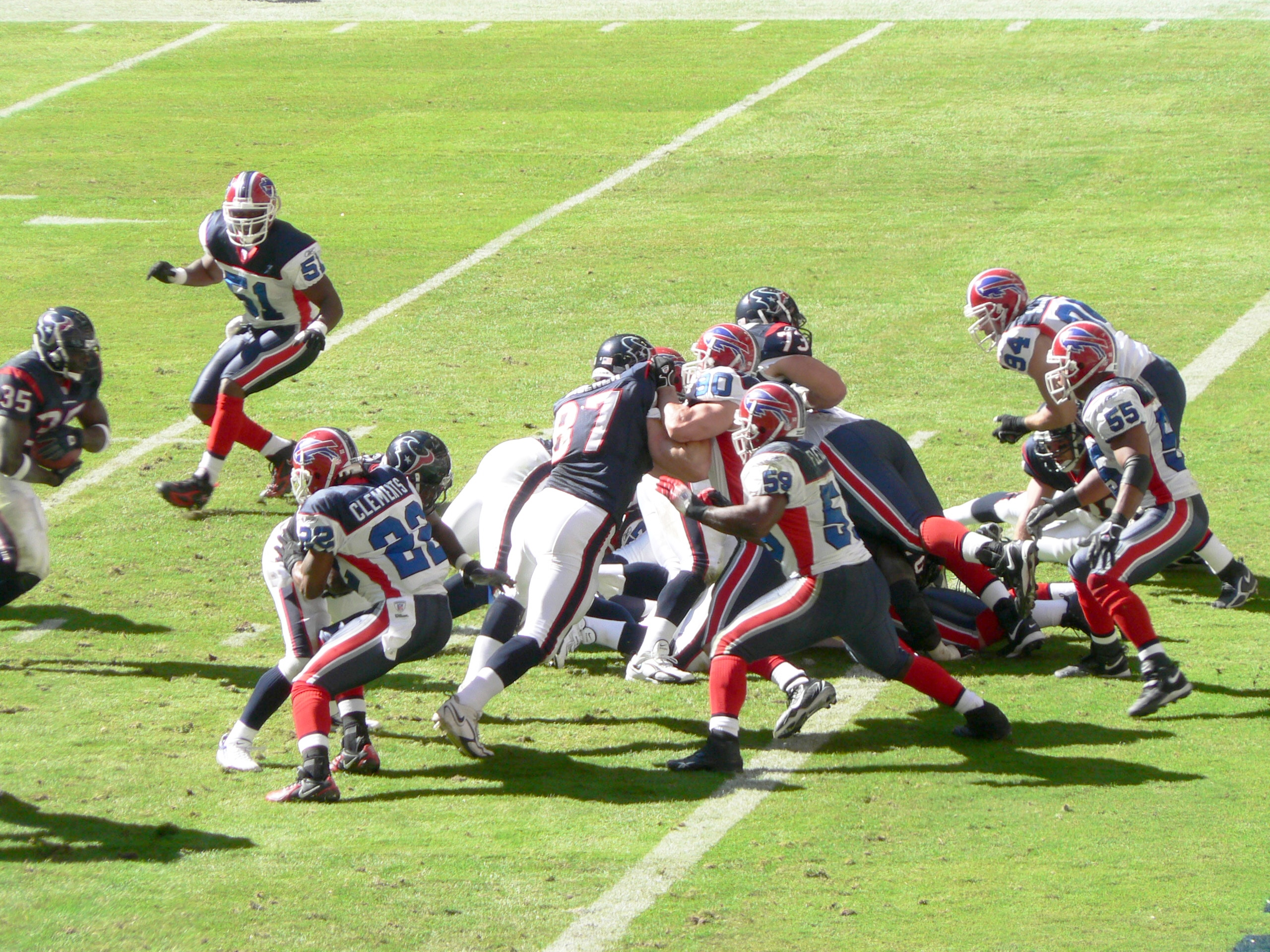
Gado rushes.

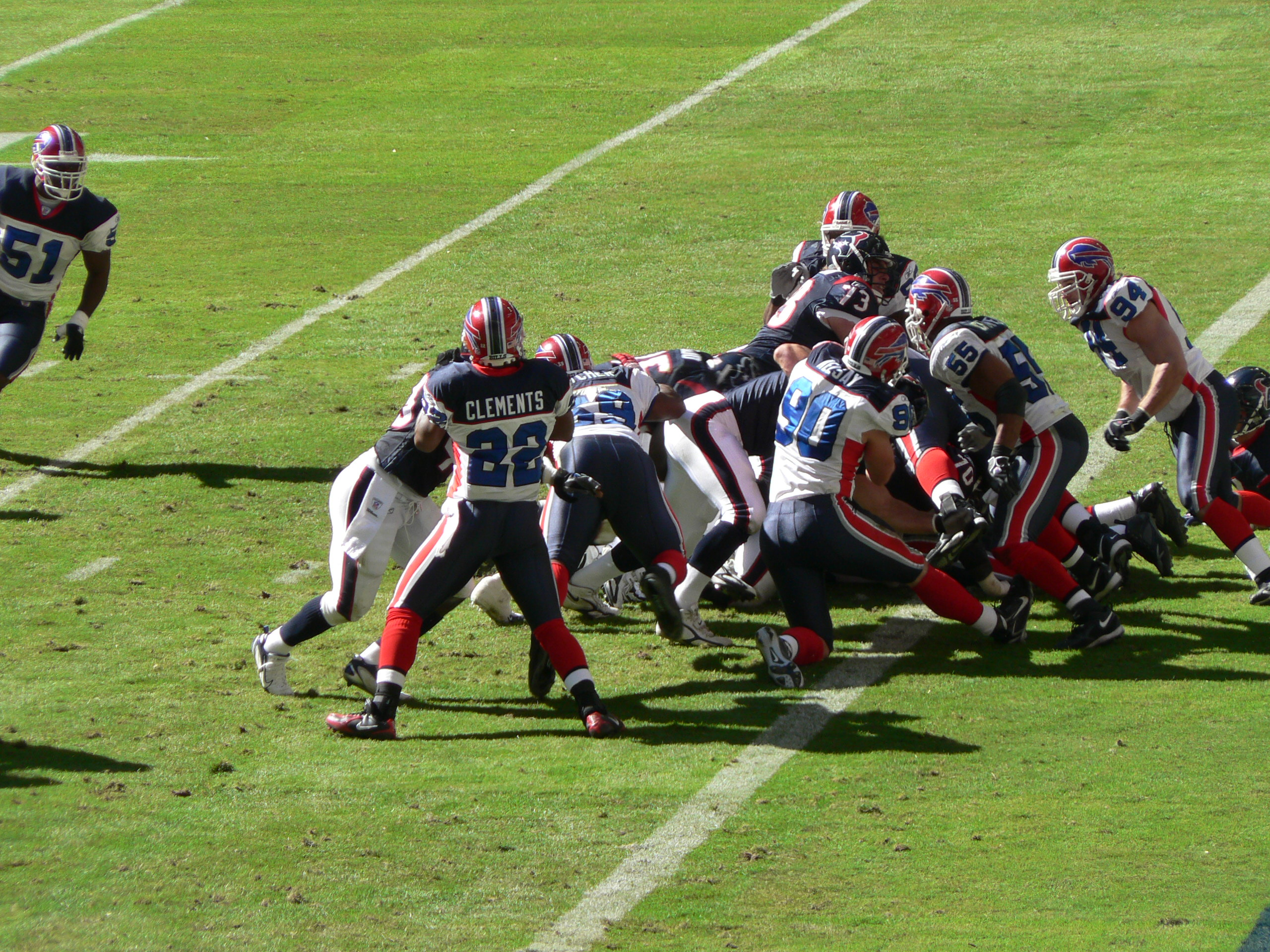
The Texans attempt a rush at the goal line.

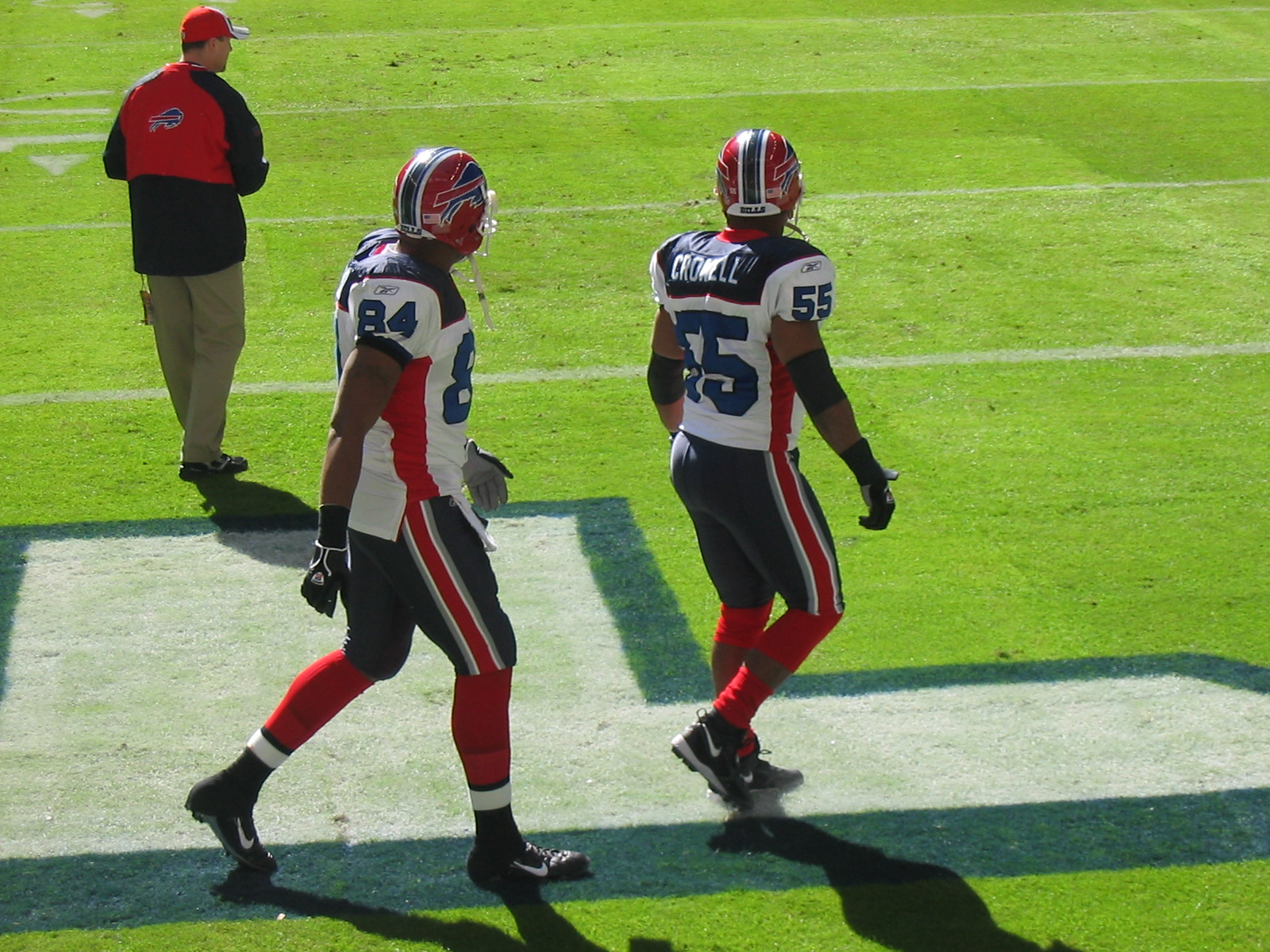
Robert Royal and Angelo Crowell.

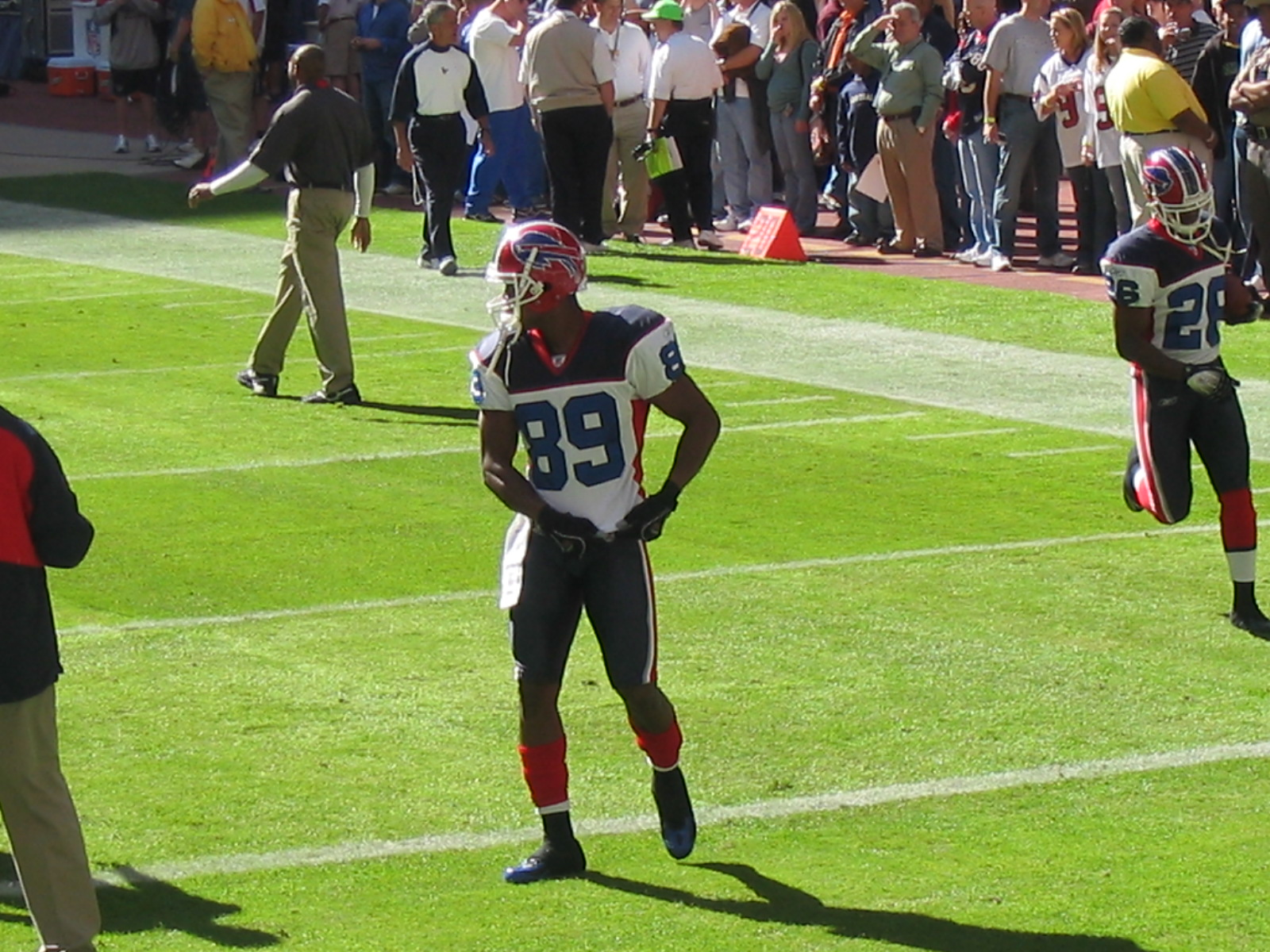
Sam Aiken at Houston.

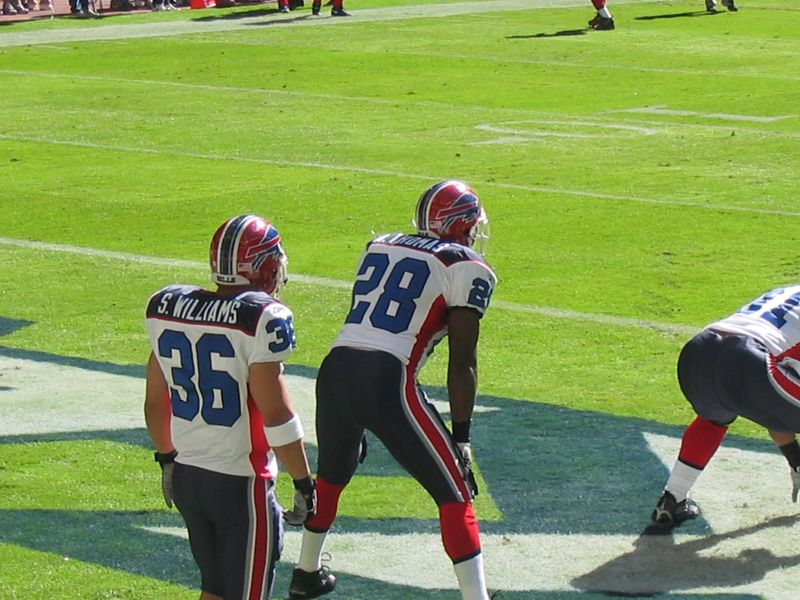
Anthony Thomas (#28) and Shaud Williams .(#36)

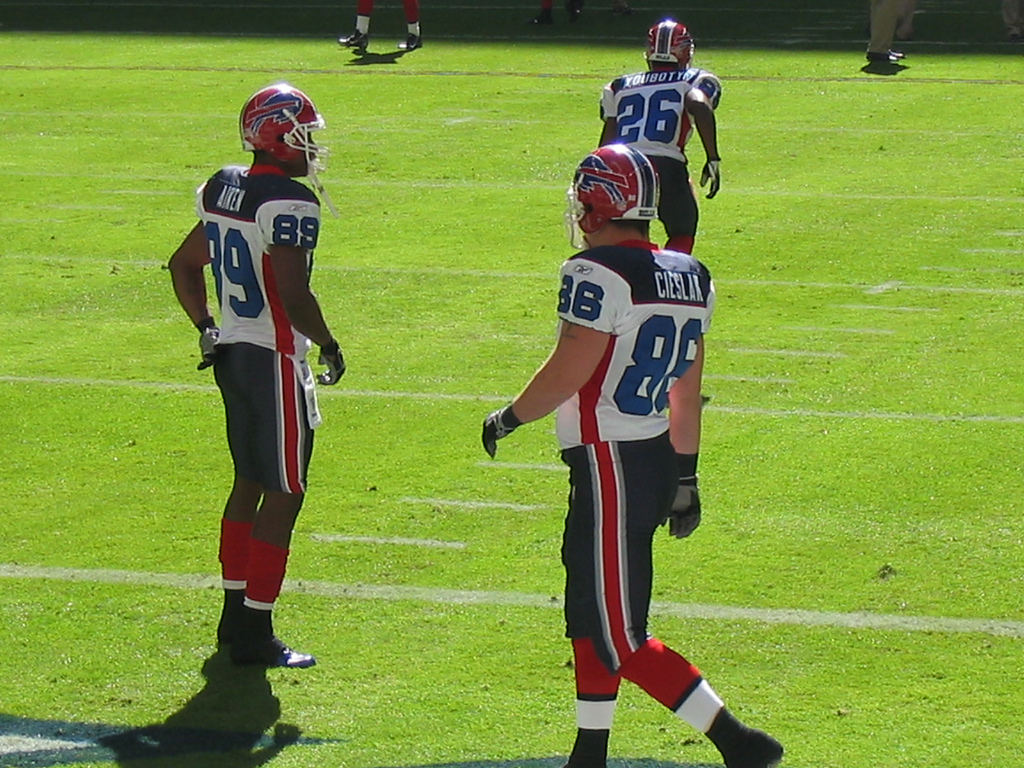
Brad Cieslak, Sam Aiken and Ashton Youboty.

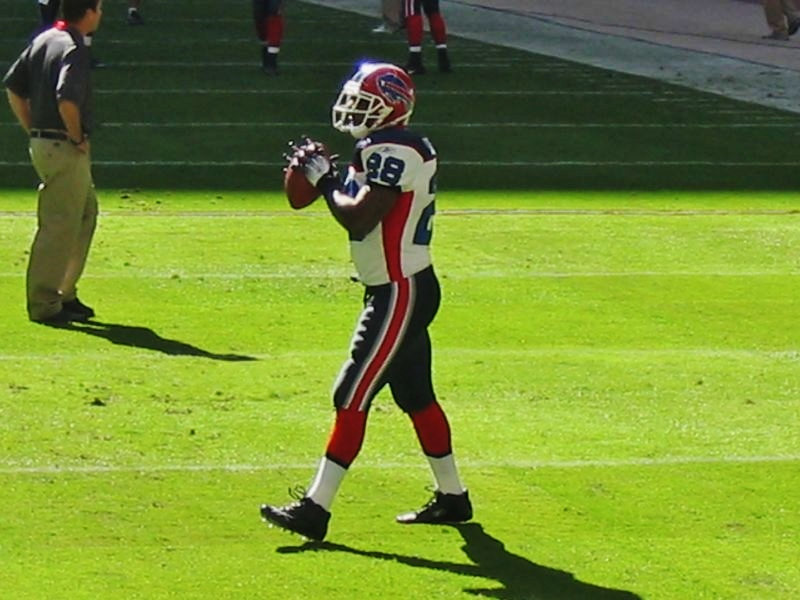
Anthony Thomas warming up.

=== Week 12: vs Jacksonville Jaguars ===
Week Twelve: Jacksonville Jaguars at Buffalo Bills – Game summary

| Quarter | 1 | 2 | 3 | 4 | Total |
|---|---|---|---|---|---|
| Jaguars | 0 | 14 | 0 | 10 | 24 |
| Bills | 7 | 10 | 7 | 3 | 27 |

at Ralph Wilson Stadium, Orchard Park, New York

- Date: November 26
- Game time: 1:00pm ET
- Game weather: 59 °F (15 °C), partly cloudy
- Game attendance: 63,608
- Referee: Gerald Austin
- TV announcers (CBS (blacked out locally)): Ian Eagle and Solomon Wilcots
- Recap

Game information

First quarter

- BUF – Willis McGahee 4-yard run (Rian Lindell kick), 3:23. Bills 7–0. Drive: 4 plays, 28 yards, 2:04.

Second quarter

- BUF – Lindell 21-yard FG, 12:58. Bills 10–0. Drive: 6 plays, 54 yards, 3:11.
- JAX – Maurice Jones-Drew 14-yard run (Josh Scobee kick), 10:25. Bills 10–7. Drive: 5 plays, 62 yards, 2:33.
- BUF – McGahee 30-yard run (Lindell kick), 6:32. Bills 17–7. Drive: 8 plays, 80 yards, 3:53.
- JAX – Marcedes Lewis 1-yard pass from David Garrard (Scobee kick), 1:11. Bills 17–14. Drive: 9 plays, 71 yards, 5:21.

Third quarter

- BUF – Roscoe Parrish 81-yard return (Lindell kick), 3:46. Bills 24–14.

Fourth quarter

- JAX – Scobee 27-yard FG, 14:56. Bills 24–17. Drive: 7 plays, 38 yards, 3:50.
- JAX – Matt Jones 3-yard pass from Garrard (Scobee kick), 2:58. Tie 24–24. Drive: 11 plays, 62 yards, 2:30.
- BUF – Lindell 42-yard FG, 0:00. Bills 27–24. Drive: 4 plays, 36 yards, 0:28.

Top passers

- JAX – David Garrard – 16/22, 132 yds, 2 TD
- BUF – J. P. Losman – 21/28, 169 yds, INT

Top rushers

- JAX – Fred Taylor – 22 rush, 101 yds
- BUF – Willis McGahee – 12 rush, 83 yds, 2 TD

Top receivers

- JAX – Maurice Jones-Drew – 5 rec, 47 yds
- BUF – Lee Evans – 5 rec, 58 yds

With the momentum of a late-game victory against Houston and the return of Willis McGahee, who had missed the previous three weeks with rib injuries, the Bills took an early lead and held off the Jaguars at the end. After Jacksonville scored with 0:34 remaining and after a questionable squib kick, J. P. Losman threw a pass down the sideline to Roscoe Parrish who kept his toes in just enough to set up a game-winning Rian Lindell 42-yard FG as time expired. Parrish had earlier made the game's biggest play of the game when he had an 81-yard punt return in the third quarter. With their second straight victory, the Bills improved to 5–6.

=== Week 13: San Diego Chargers ===
Week Thirteen: San Diego Chargers at Buffalo Bills – Game summary

| Quarter | 1 | 2 | 3 | 4 | Total |
|---|---|---|---|---|---|
| Chargers | 10 | 7 | 0 | 7 | 24 |
| Bills | 0 | 0 | 14 | 7 | 21 |

at Ralph Wilson Stadium, Orchard Park, New York

- Date: December 3
- Game time: 1:02pm ET
- Game weather: 34 °F (1 °C), overcast
- Game attendance: 63,361
- Referee: Ed Hochuli
- TV announcers (CBS (blacked out locally)): Gus Johnson and Steve Tasker
- Recap

Game information

First quarter

- SD – Nate Kaeding 42-yard FG, 9:12. Chargers 3–0. Drive: 8 plays, 34 yards, 3:52.
- SD – LaDainian Tomlinson 51-yard run (Kaeding kick), 1:06. Chargers 10–0. Drive: 2 plays, 59 yards, 0:34.

Second quarter

- SD – Antonio Gates 11-yard pass from Philip Rivers (Kaeding kick), 0:24. Chargers 17–0. Drive: 5 plays, 43 yards, 0:30.

Third quarter

- BUF – Robert Royal 5-yard pass from Losman (Lindell kick), 11:33. Chargers 17–7. Drive: 4 plays, 19 yards, 2:00.
- BUF – Willis McGahee 2-yard run (Lindell kick), 8:09. Chargers 17–14. Drive: 4 plays, 13 yards, 1:55.

Fourth quarter

- SD – Tomlinson 2-yard run (Kaeding kick), 3:26. Chargers 24–14. Drive: 13 plays, 80 yards, 8:06.
- BUF – Peerless Price 6-yard pass from Losman (Lindell kick), 30:. Chargers 24–21. Drive: 10 plays, 62 yards, 1:56.

Top passers

- SD – Philip Rivers – 17/29, 160 yds, TD
- BUF – J. P. Losman – 21/37, 184 yds, 2 TD, 2 INT

Top rushers

- SD – LaDainian Tomlinson – 28 rush, 178 yds, 2 TD
- BUF – J. P. Losman – 6 rush, 26 yds

Top receivers

- SD – Antonio Gates – 7 rec, 90 yds, TD
- BUF – Josh Reed – 4 rec, 50 yds

Keeping some slim playoff hopes alive, the Bills stayed home, donned their throwback jerseys again and faced a fierce Week 13 challenge against the San Diego Chargers. In the first quarter, the Chargers struck first with kicker Nate Kaeding getting a 42-yard FG, while LaDainian Tomlinson got a 51-yard run. In the second quarter, Buffalo continued to struggle as Philip Rivers completed an 11-yard pass to Antonio Gates for the only score of the period. In the third quarter, the Bills scored with J. P. Losman completing a 6-yard pass to Robert Royal, while Willis McGahee got a 2-yard run. However, in the fourth quarter, Tomlinson got his second touchdown run of the day, a 2-yarder. A 6-yard pass from Losman to Peerless Price closed the gap, but a failed onside kick sealed any chance of a comeback victory. With the loss, the Bills dropped to 5–7.

=== Week 14: at New York Jets ===
Week Fifteen: Buffalo Bills at New York Jets – Game summary

| Quarter | 1 | 2 | 3 | 4 | Total |
|---|---|---|---|---|---|
| Bills | 7 | 14 | 7 | 3 | 31 |
| Jets | 7 | 6 | 0 | 0 | 13 |

at Giants Stadium, East Rutherford, New Jersey

- Date: December 10
- Game time: 4:15pm ET
- Game weather: 54 °F (12 °C), clear
- Game attendance: 77,131
- Referee: Walt Anderson
- TV announcers (CBS): Ian Eagle and Solomon Wilcots
- Recap

Game information

First quarter

- BUF – Willis McGahee 57-yard run (Rian Lindell kick), 4:22. Bills 7–0. Drive: 4 plays, 78 yards, 1:37.
- NYJ – Laveranues Coles 10-yard pass from Chad Pennington (Mike Nugent kick), 1:08. Tie 7–7. Drive: 6 plays, 51 yards, 3:14.

Second quarter

- NYJ – Nugent 30-yard FG, 10:58. Jets 10–7. Drive: 7 plays, 14 yards, 3:19.
- BUF – Lee Evans 77-yard pass from J. P. Losman (Lindell kick), 4:47. Bills 14–10. Drive: 3 plays, 84 yards, 1:26.
- BUF – Nate Clements 58-yard INT return, 1:47. Bills 21–10.
- NYJ – Nugent 38-yard FG, 0:01. Bills 21–13. Drive: 11 plays, 57 yards, 1:46.

Third quarter

- BUF – Robert Royal 6-yard pass from Losman (Lindell kick), 1:58. Bills 28–13. Drive: 4 plays, 18 yards, 1:30.

Fourth quarter

- BUF – Lindell 34-yard FG, 7:21. Bills 31–13. Drive: 11 plays, 57 yards, 6:48.

Top passers

- BUF – J. P. Losman – 10/15, 157 yds, 2 TD
- NYJ – Chad Pennington – 22/35, 182 yds, TD 2 INT

Top rushers

- BUF – Willis McGahee – 16 rush, 125 yds, TD
- NYJ – Leon Washington – 7 rush, 55 yds

Top receivers

- BUF – Lee Evans – 2 rec, 91 yards, TD
- NYJ – Laveranues Coles – 4 rec, 67 yards, TD

Hoping to avoid being swept by their AFC East rival and keep their playoff hopes alive all at the same time, the Bills met the Jets in The Meadowlands. Willis McGahee extended his string of 100-yard rushing games vs. the Jets to five with 125 yards on 16 carries, including a 57-yard run in the first quarter. After allowing a 10-yard pass from Chad Pennington to Laveranues Coles and a Mike Nugent FG, the Bills broke the game open with a 77-yard J. P. Losman pass to Lee Evans and a 58-yard interception return by Nate Clements. The Jets cut their deficit to 21–13 after a Nugent FG on the ensuing possession, but would end up scoreless for the rest of the game. Meanwhile, the Bills defense held the Jets in check as a Pennington fumble in the third quarter set up another J. P. Losman pass, this time to Robert Royal. The Bills would add a FG of their own in the fourth quarter to extend their lead to 31–13. With the win, not only did the Bills improve to 6–7, but they mathematically remained in playoff contention, two games behind current wild card occupants Jacksonville and Cincinnati.

=== Week 15: vs. Miami Dolphins ===
Week Fifteen: Miami Dolphins at Buffalo Bills – Game summary

| Quarter | 1 | 2 | 3 | 4 | Total |
|---|---|---|---|---|---|
| Dolphins | 0 | 0 | 0 | 0 | 0 |
| Bills | 0 | 7 | 7 | 7 | 21 |

at Ralph Wilson Stadium, Orchard Park, New York

- Date: December 17
- Game time: 1:00pm ET
- Game weather: 48 °F (9 °C), overcast
- Game attendance: 71,011
- Referee: Bill Carollo
- TV announcers (CBS (blacked out locally)): Don Criqui and Steve Beuerlein
- Recap

Game information

First quarter

- No scoring plays

Second quarter

- BUF – Robert Royal 33-yard pass from J. P. Losman (Rian Lindell kick), 4:40. Bills 7–0. Drive: 4 plays, 67 yards, 1:53.

Third quarter

- BUF – Josh Reed 27-yard pass from Losman (Lindell kick), 8:06. Bills 14–0. Drive: 7 plays, 55 yards, 3:21.

Fourth quarter

- BUF – Lee Evans 21-yard pass from Losman (Lindell kick), 10:21. Bills 21–0. Drive: 7 plays, 53 yards, 4:28.

Top passers

- MIA – Joey Harrington – 9/16, 98 yds, 2 INT
- BUF – J. P. Losman – 13/19, 200 yds, 3 TD

Top rushers

- MIA – Sammy Morris – 20 rush, 71 yds
- BUF – Willis McGahee – 28 rush, 79 yds

Top receivers

- MIA – Wes Welker – 4 rec, 56 yds
- BUF – Lee Evans – 3 rec, 67 yds, TD

In order to remain in contention for the playoffs, the Bills had to defeat—and sweep—the Dolphins, which they did in convincing and dominating fashion. J. P. Losman played well with 200 yards passing, three touchdowns and no interceptions. However, his counterpart, Joey Harrington, was ineffective, throwing for only 98 yards with two interceptions and achieved a 0.0 passer rating. After a scoreless first quarter, Losman threw a 33-yard touchdown pass to Robert Royal, putting the Bills ahead 7–0 into halftime. In the third quarter, Losman threw a 27-yard pass to Josh Reed, putting the Bills up by two touchdowns 14–0. In the final quarter, Losman threw another TD pass, this time a 21-yarder to Lee Evans. Miami had the ball on Buffalo's 1-yard line with 0:06 remaining. Looking for a touchdown, Cleo Lemon threw a pass intended for Chris Chambers but was batted down at the line of scrimmage by Ryan Denney, keeping the Dolphins scoreless. With the win, the Bills improved to 7–7.

=== Week 16: vs. Tennessee Titans ===
Week Sixteen: Tennessee Titans at Buffalo Bills – Game summary

| Quarter | 1 | 2 | 3 | 4 | Total |
|---|---|---|---|---|---|
| Titans | 7 | 13 | 0 | 10 | 30 |
| Bills | 10 | 9 | 10 | 0 | 29 |

at Ralph Wilson Stadium, Orchard Park, New York

- Date: December 24
- Game time: 1:00pm ET
- Game weather: 39 °F (4 °C), overcast
- Game attendance: 54,765
- Referee: Jeff Triplette
- TV announcers (CBS (blacked out locally)): Gus Johnson and Steve Tasker
- Recap

Game information

First quarter

- BUF – Rian Lindell 21-yard FG, 11:20. Bills 3–0. Drive: 9 plays, 43 yards, 3:40.
- TEN – Bobby Wade 22-yard pass from Vince Young (Rob Bironas kick), 7:54. Titans 7–3. Drive: 6 plays, 68 yards, 3:26.
- BUF – Willis McGahee 1-yard run (Lindell kick), 2:30. Bills 10–7. Drive: 10 plays, 71 yards, 5:24.

Second quarter

- SD – Bironas 42-yard FG, 12:34. Tie 10–10. Drive: 8 plays, 42 yards, 4:56.
- SD – Bironas 20-yard FG, 9:15. Titans 13–10. Drive: 5 plays, 35 yards, 2:05.
- BUF – Lindell 36-yard FG, 6:26. Tie 13–13. Drive: 8 plays, 44 yards, 2:49.
- BUF – Lindell 45-yard FG, 1:01. Bills 16–13. Drive: 6 plays, 38 yards, 0:48.
- TEN – Young 36-yard run (Bironas kick), 0:01. Titans 20–19. Drive: 5 plays, 57 yards, 1:00.
- BUF – Lindell 21-yard FG, 0:00. Titans 23–19. Drive: 2 plays, 57 yards, 0:01.

Third quarter

- BUF – Lee Evans 37-yard pass from Losman (Lindell kick), 9:11. Bills 26–23. Drive: 7 plays, 58 yards, 4:02.
- BUF – Lindell 24-yard FG, 4:01. Bills 29–20. 3:30. Drive: 10 plays, 33 yards, 3:31.

Fourth quarter

- TEN – Brandon Jones 29-yard pass from Young (Bironas kick), 11:14. Bills 29–27. Drive: 9 plays, 62 yards, 4:16.
- TEN – Bironas 30-yard FG, 2:10. Titans 30–29. Drive: 14 plays, 75 yards, 7:15.

Top passers

- TEN – Vince Young – 13/20, 183 yds, 2 TD
- BUF – J. P. Losman – 19/33, 266 yds, TD, 2 INT

Top rushers

- TEN – Travis Henry – 25 rush, 135 yds
- BUF – Willis McGahee – 22 rush, 95 yds, TD

Top receivers

- TEN – Brandon Jones – 5 rec, 101 yds, TD
- BUF – Peerless Price – 7 rec, 73 yds

After the victory over Miami, the Bills stayed home for a Week 16 intraconference game with the Tennessee Titans. The Titans (like the Bills) were 7–7 and also hunting for a wildcard berth. In the first quarter, Buffalo scored first with kicker Rian Lindell getting a 21-yard FG. Tennessee would respond with Vince Young completing a 22-yard pass to Bobby Wade. The Bills came back with Willis McGahee's 1-yard TD run. In the second quarter, the Titans regained the lead with kicker Rob Bironas getting a 42-yard and a 20-yard FG. Afterwards, the Bills came back with Lindell kicking a 36-yard and a 45-yard FG. Then, Tennessee went back into the lead with Young's 36-yard run. Buffalo would score with another 21-yard FG from Lindell, this one before halftime. In the third quarter, J. P. Losman completed a 37-yard pass to Lee Evans and afterwards Lindell kicked a 24-yard FG. In the fourth quarter, the Titans won the game with Young completing a 29-yard pass to Brandon Jones and Bironas' fifth FG of the game, a 30-yarder. J. P. Losman led the Bills on one final drive down to the Titans' 28-yard line, but driving against a wind that was gusting up to 20 mph, the Bills elected not to try a potential game-winning FG, sealing the game for the Titans. With the loss, not only did the Bills fall to 7–8 in their final home game of the season, but they were also eliminated from playoff contention heading into the season finale.

=== Week 17: at Baltimore Ravens ===
Week Seventeen: Buffalo Bills at Baltimore Ravens – Game summary

| Quarter | 1 | 2 | 3 | 4 | Total |
|---|---|---|---|---|---|
| Bills | 0 | 0 | 7 | 0 | 7 |
| Ravens | 3 | 3 | 10 | 3 | 19 |

at M&T Bank Stadium, Baltimore, Maryland

- Date: December 31
- Game time: 4:15pm ET
- Game weather: 43 °F (6 °C), overcast
- Game attendance: 70,913
- Referee: Scott Green
- TV announcers (CBS): Kevin Harlan and Rich Gannon
- Recap

Game information

First quarter

- BAL – Matt Stover 26-yard FG, 7:08. Ravens 3–0. Drive: 13 plays, 55 yards, 7:52.

Second quarter

- BAL – Stover 37-yard FG, 1:32. Ravens 6–0. Drive: 13 plays, 61 yards, 5:11.

Third quarter

- BAL – Stover 39-yard FG, 12:28. Ravens 9–0. Drive: 4 plays, 4 yards, 1:47.
- BUF – Lee Evans 44-yard pass from J. P. Losman (Rian Lindell kick), 8:08. Ravens 9–7. Drive: 9 plays, 76 yards, 4:20.
- BAL – Chris McAlister 31-yard INT return (Stover kick), 3:46. Ravens 16–7.

Fourth quarter

- BAL – Stover 29-yard FG, 4:48. Ravens 19–7. Drive: 9 plays, 46 yards, 4:18.

Top passers

- BAL – Ryan Fitzpatrick – 23/35, 216 yds, INT
- BUF – J. P. Losman – 20/35, 237 yds, TD, 2 INT

Top rushers

- BAL – Jamal Lewis – 20 rush, 69 yds
- BUF – Willis McGahee – 11 rush, 23 yds

Top receivers

- BAL – Todd Heap – 5 rec, 60 yards
- BUF – Lee Evans – 7 rec, 145 yards, TD

J. P. Losman threw for 237 yards, a touchdown and two interceptions, one of which a pick-six. Willis McGahee rushed for 23 yards on 11 carries. Lee Evans had seven receptions for 145 yards and the only score for Buffalo, a 44-yard TD. In the first quarter, Matt Stover made a 26-yard field goal, bringing the Ravens up 3–0 at the end of the first. Just before halftime, Stover made another field goal, this one from 37 yards out, for a 6–0 halftime lead. In the third quarter, Stover made his third field goal of the day, bringing the Ravens up 9–0. After Evans' TD, Losman threw a pass that was intercepted by Chris McAlister and returned for a touchdown. In the fourth quarter, Stover made his fourth and final field goal that increased the Ravens' lead to 19–7. With the loss, the Bills finished the season at 7–9 which was a 2 game improvement over last year.

== Standings ==
AFC East
| | W | L | T | PCT | DIV | CONF | PF | PA | STK |
|---|---|---|---|---|---|---|---|---|---|
| ^{(4)} New England Patriots | 12 | 4 | 0 | .750 | 4–2 | 8–4 | 385 | 237 | W3 |
| ^{(5)} New York Jets | 10 | 6 | 0 | .625 | 4–2 | 7–5 | 316 | 295 | W3 |
| Buffalo Bills | 7 | 9 | 0 | .438 | 3–3 | 5–7 | 300 | 311 | L2 |
| Miami Dolphins | 6 | 10 | 0 | .375 | 1–5 | 3–9 | 260 | 283 | L3 |
