= 2005 All-Pacific-10 Conference football team =

The 2005 All-Pacific-10 Conference football team consists of American football players chosen by various organizations for All-Pacific-10 Conference teams for the 2005 college football season. The USC Trojans won the conference, posting an undefeated 8–0 conference record (though this was later vacated).. USC then lost to the Texas Longhorns in the Rose Bowl BCS National Championship Game 41 to 38. USC running back Reggie Bush was voted Pac-10 Offensive Player of the Year. Oregon defensive tackle Haloti Ngata and Arizona State linebacker Dale Robinson were voted Pat Tillman Pac-10 Co-Defensive Players of the Year.

== Offensive selections ==
=== Quarterbacks ===
- Matt Leinart, USC (Coaches-1)
- Drew Olson, UCLA (Coaches-2)

=== Running backs ===
- Reggie Bush, USC (Coaches-1)
- Jerome Harrison, Washington St. (Coaches-1)
- LenDale White, USC (Coaches-2)
- Maurice Drew, UCLA (Coaches-2)

=== Wide receivers ===
- Mike Hass, Oregon St. (Coaches-1)
- Derek Hagan, Arizona St. (Coaches-1)
- Dwayne Jarrett, USC (Coaches-1)
- Jason Hill, Washington St. (Coaches-2)
- Demetrius Williams, Oregon (Coaches-2)

=== Tight ends ===
- Marcedes Lewis, UCLA (Coaches-1)
- Troy Bienemann, Washington St. (Coaches-2)

=== Tackles ===
- Sam Baker, USC (Coaches-1)
- Ryan O'Callaghan, California (Coaches-1)

=== Guards ===
- Marvin Philip, California (Coaches-1)
- Deuce Lutui, USC (Coaches-1)
- Grayling Love, Arizona St. (Coaches-2)
- Fred Matua, USC (Coaches-2)
- Aaron Merz, California (Coaches-2)

=== Centers ===
- Ryan Kalil, USC (Coaches-1)
- Enoka Lucas, Oregon (Coaches-2)
- Nick Mihlhauser, Washington St. (Coaches-2)

== Defensive selections ==
=== Ends ===
- Frostee Rucker, USC (Coaches-1)
- Lawrence Jackson, USC (Coaches-1)
- Mkristo Bruce, Washington St. (Coaches-2)
- Nu'u Tafisi, California (Coaches-2)
- Copeland Bryan, Arizona (Coaches-2)

=== Tackles ===
- Haloti Ngata, Oregon (Coaches-1)
- Brandon Mebane, California (Coaches-1)
- Sir Henry Anderson, Oregon St. (Coaches-2)

=== Linebackers ===
- Dale Robinson, Arizona St. (Coaches-1)
- Keith Ellison, Oregon St. (Coaches-1)
- Trent Bray, Oregon St. (Coaches-1)
- Anthony Trucks, Oregon (Coaches-2)
- Desmond Bishop, California (Coaches-2)
- Joe Lobendahn, Washington (Coaches-2)
- Spencer Havner, UCLA (Coaches-2)

=== Cornerbacks ===
- Justin Phinisee, Oregon (Coaches-1)
- Dante Hughes, California (Coaches-1)
- Aaron Gipson, Oregon (Coaches-2)
- Antoine Cason, Arizona (Coaches-2)

=== Safeties ===
- Darnell Bing, USC (Coaches-1)
- Darrell Brooks, Arizona (Coaches-1)
- Scott Ware, USC (Coaches-2)
- J. D. Nelson, Oregon (Coaches-2)
- Donnie McCleskey, California (Coaches-2)

== Special teams ==
=== Placekickers ===
- Alexis Serna, Oregon St. (Coaches-1)
- Justin Medlock, UCLA (Coaches-2)

=== Punters ===
- Sam Paulescu, Oregon St. (Coaches-1)
- Danny Baugher, Arizona (Coaches-2)

=== Return specialists ===
- Terry Richardson, Arizona St. (Coaches-1)
- Maurice Drew, UCLA (Coaches-1)
- T. J. Rushing, Stanford (Coaches-2)
- Reggie Bush, USC (Coaches-2)

=== Special teams player ===
- Tim Wusu, Stanford (Coaches-1)
- Derrick Doggett, Oregon St. (Coaches-2)
- Byron Storer, California (Coaches-2)

== Key ==
Coaches = selected by Pac-12 coaches

# = unanimous selection by coaches

== See also ==
- 2005 College Football All-America Team
