= Booker T. Washington High School (Georgia) =

Public high school in Atlanta, Georgia, United States

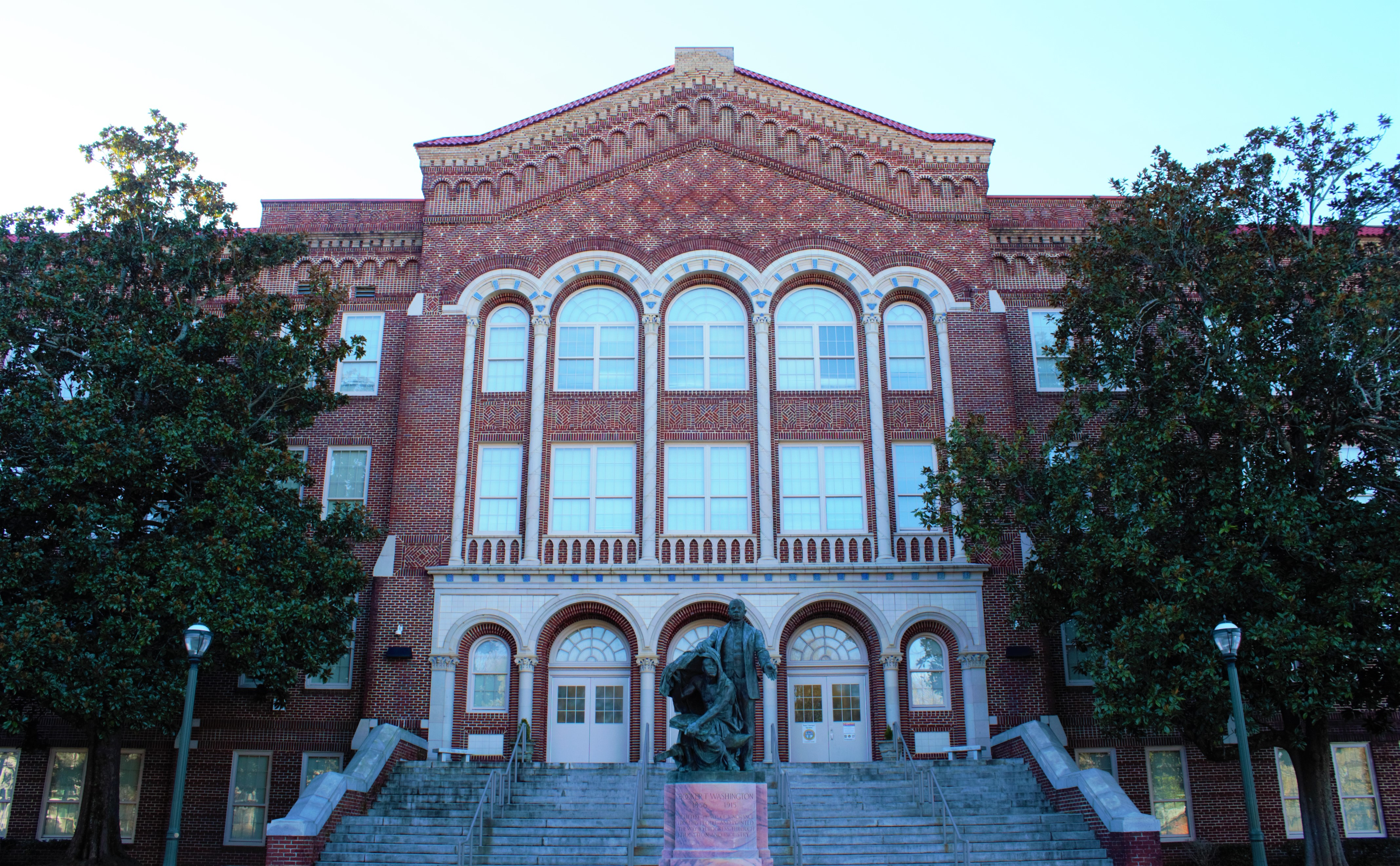
- Booker T. Washington High School in 2016

Location
- 45 White House Drive; Atlanta, Georgia 30314; United States

Information
- School type: Public, college preparatory, exam, 21st-century small learning communities
- Motto: "One Family, One Destiny"
- Founded: 1924
- School district: Atlanta Public Schools
- Superintendent: Bryan Johnson
- Principal: Tiauna Crooms
- Staff: 59.90 (FTE)
- Grades: 9–12
- Enrollment: 859 (2023-2024)
- Student to teacher ratio: 14.34
- Language: English
- Campus: Urban
- Area: Historic Washington Park
- Colors: Royal Blue and white
- Mascot: Bulldog
- Website: www.atlantapublicschools.us/btw

- Booker T. Washington High School
- U.S. National Register of Historic Places
- Atlanta Landmark Building
- Location within Atlanta Location within Georgia Location within the United States
- Location: 45 Whitehouse Dr. SW, Atlanta, Georgia
- Coordinates: 33°45′12″N 84°25′18″W
- Area: 21.4 acres (8.7 ha)
- Built: 1924
- Architect: Wachendorff, Eugene C.
- Architectural style: Medieval eclectic
- NRHP reference No.: 86000437

Significant dates
- Added to NRHP: March 18, 1986
- Designated ALB: October 14, 1989

Booker T. Washington High School is a public high school in Atlanta, Georgia, United States. Named for the famous educator Booker T. Washington, the school opened in September 1924 under the auspices of the Atlanta Board of Education, with the late Charles Lincoln Harper as principal. It was the first public high school for African-Americans in the state of Georgia and the Atlanta Public Schools system.

Booker T. Washington High School was transformed into four small schools. Starting in the fall of 2014, the school transitioned back to the original one school, with four assistant principals, one academy leader, and one principal.

== Administration ==
- Tiauna Crooms, EdS - principal

== History ==
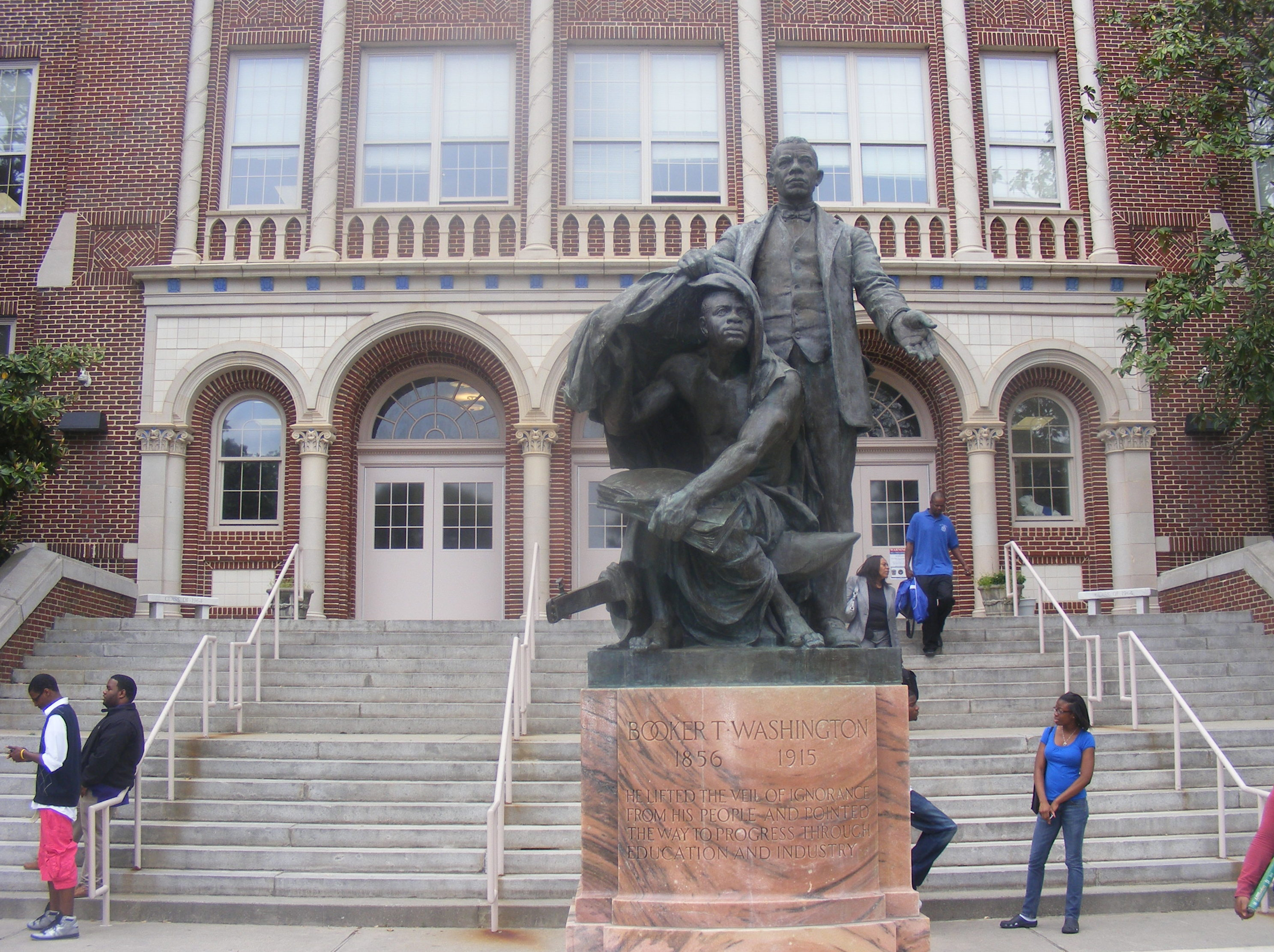

Designed by Atlanta-born architect Eugene C. Wachendorff, the building incorporates medieval and Byzantine elements, including the dramatic main entrance with five arches in two tiers. Six additions have been made to the original four-story building, which is situated on 21.4 acres (87,000 m^{2}) of land. The building is listed on the National Register of Historic Places.

It is fitting that visitors pass the statue of the school's eponym on the way to the entrance. One of the foremost black educators of the late 19th and early 20th centuries, Booker T. Washington was born into slavery in 1856 on a small farm in Virginia. He founded the Tuskegee Institute in 1881.

In 1927, the only exact replica of the Booker T. Washington monument at Tuskegee University in Alabama was erected at the school's entrance. The statue of Washington, called "Booker T. Washington Lifting the Veil of Ignorance," is a replica of the original bronze at the Tuskegee Institute by sculptor Charles Keck. The inscription reads: "He lifted the veil of ignorance from his people and pointed the way to progress through education and industry."

Today, the school––which was placed on the National Register of Historic Places in 1986––boasts an enrollment of more than 1600 students and a faculty and staff of more than 100.

Visitors to the historic institution have included South African Archbishop Desmond Tutu, activist Jesse Jackson, civil rights pioneer Rosa Parks, and President George W. Bush.

The school serves as a cornerstone of Atlanta Public School's comprehensive reform program, Project GRAD (Graduation Really Achieves Dreams). The project aims to increase the number of inner-city students who graduate and go to college.

== Academics ==
=== Washington Early College ===
Booker T. Washington High School-Early College is one of the newest early college small schools in the Atlanta Public Schools system. The premise behind the early college concept is to afford students the opportunity to obtain college credits while going to high school. BTWHS-EC aims to prepare students to pursue post-secondary education at some of the top universities and colleges in the U.S.

In addition to the core program of study, students are required to take the following classes to meet the requirements of the Early College School:

- Early College Seminar
- Early College Math
- Early College English
- Early College Social Studies
- Early College Science

=== Washington Banking, Finance, and Investment ===
The Booker T. Washington High School Banking, Finance and Investment Small School (BFI) gives BTW high school students an opportunity to learn about and prepare for college careers in business and finance. Emphasis is placed on a college preparatory curriculum that is directly linked to the business world.

This school prepares students for careers in business and finance with challenging courses. It focuses on broad, transferable skills, with an emphasis on financial industry elements such as accounting, financial planning, management, banking, credit, economics, money management, technology, investments, and insurance. In addition to their required courses, BFI students take one or two specialized courses each semester and a college-level course in their senior year. Students also participate in job shadowing experiences and paid internships.

BFI is a part of the National Academy Foundation's Academy of Finance. This foundation assists in establishing an ongoing relationship that involves corporate executives, school personnel, parents, and students, and results in paid internships, scholarships, and employment opportunities. Students are provided opportunities to enter into paid internships with local financial service companies during the summer of their senior year, and many offers of part-time employment during the school year are provided. BFI also has the Institute of Student Achievement (ISA) as its intermediary partner. This organization supports the school's planning process, curriculum development, leadership development, and overall development of the small learning communities.

=== Washington Health, Science, and Nutrition ===
The Booker T. Washington High School of Health Science and Nutrition (BTWHSN) provides an interdisciplinary curriculum with a health care and nutrition concentration through in-depth investigation, hands-on discovery, experimentation, and inquiry-based learning. Through a four-year program of study, students have the opportunity to:

- Undergo a rigorous and relevant curriculum and receive in-depth instruction designed to ensure that all students meet the graduation requirements of the Atlanta Public Schools system while affording them multiple opportunities for postsecondary study.
- Gain college credit through dual enrollment and advanced placement courses.
- Explore career interest in various nutrition and health care-related fields.
- Gain invaluable knowledge, skills, and experiences through medical seminars, internships, and health science field trips.
- Partake in an array of shadowing opportunities and hands-on modules.

Booker T. Washington High School of Health Science and Nutrition offers two career pathways: Therapeutic Services and Nutrition & Food Science.

== Feeder patterns ==
- Elementary schools:

M. Agnes Jones Elementary School

Tuskegee Airmen Global Academy

Micheal R. Hollis Innovation Academy(K-8)

- Middle schools:

Hermen J. Russell West End Academy

== Local School Council ==
The property and business of the Booker T. Washington High School Local Council is managed by seven school council members, of whom two are parents or guardians of students enrolled in the school, two are teachers, and two are business education partners. The principal serves as chairperson of the Local School Council, which meets on the first Monday of each month from 9:00-10:00 am in the second-floor conference room at the school.

== Athletics ==
- Football
- Softball
- Baseball
- Track & field
- Cross country
- Cheerleading
- Soccer
- Volleyball
- Golf
- Basketball
- Band
- Swimming
- Tennis

== Notable alumni ==
=== Religion ===
- Martin Luther King Jr. - civil rights movement leader

=== Arts and entertainment ===
- Raymond Andrews - novelist
- Bruce Bruce - actor, comedian
- Lee Moses - musician
- Jean Carne - singer
- Julius "Nipsey" Russell - actor, comedian, dancer
- Ken Sagoes - actor
- Lena Horne - actor, singer
- Dennis "Mook-B" Butler Sr. -Rapper with D4L

=== Government and politics ===
- Leroy Johnson - Georgia State Senator
- Louis Wade Sullivan - former Secretary of Health and Human Services under President George H. W. Bush

=== Science and medicine ===
- Asa G. Yancey Sr. - physician associated with Emory University and Grady Hospital

=== Sports ===
- Donn Clendenon - former professional baseball player
- Lanard Copeland - Philadelphia 76ers/NBL Australia
- Joe Douse - Negro league baseball player
- Felix Evans - Negro league baseball player
- Reshad Jones - Miami Dolphins (NFL)
- Chico Renfroe - baseball player and sportscaster
- Jabari Smith - Sacramento Kings (NBA)
- Elmore Spencer - Los Angeles Clippers (NBA)
- Walter Stith - Buffalo Bills (NFL)
- George "Duke" Robinson - Carolina Panthers (NFL)
- Christopher Phillips - Indiana University (NCAA)

== See also ==
- National Register of Historic Places listings in Fulton County, Georgia
- List of things named after Booker T. Washington
