= Kevin Ellison =

Kevin Ellison may refer to:

- Kevin Ellison (footballer) (born 1979), English footballer
- Kevin Ellison (American football) (1987–2018), American football player
