= Scott Ware =

American football player (born 1983)

No. 29
- Position: Safety

Personal information
- Born: May 5, 1983 (age 43); Santa Rosa, California, U.S.
- Listed height: 6 ft 2 in (1.88 m)
- Listed weight: 215 lb (98 kg)

Career information
- College: USC
- NFL draft: 2006: undrafted

Career history
- Philadelphia Eagles (2006)*; Indianapolis Colts (2006–2007)*; Sacramento Mountain Lions (2010)
- * Offseason or practice squad member only

Awards and highlights
- Second-team All-Pac-10 (2005)

Scott Ware (born May 5, 1983) is an American former professional football player who was a safety in the National Football League (NFL). He played college football for the USC Trojans and was signed by the Philadelphia Eagles as an undrafted free agent in 2006.

Ware was also a member of the Indianapolis Colts and Sacramento Mountain Lions.

== College career ==
Ware went to Santa Rosa Junior College, graduated from the University of Southern California, and played safety for the 2004-05 USC Trojans.

== Professional career ==
=== Philadelphia Eagles ===
Ware was signed by the Philadelphia Eagles as an undrafted free agent on May 1, 2006. He was released on August 26.

=== Indianapolis Colts ===
Ware was signed to the Indianapolis Colts practice squad on December 14, 2006. He was waived on December 26. The Colts signed Ware to a reserve/future contract on January 9, 2007. He was waived on September 1.
