= Terrance Pennington =

American football player (born 1983)

No. 79, 66
- Position: Guard / Tackle

Personal information
- Born: September 25, 1983 (age 43); Los Angeles, California, U.S.
- Listed height: 6 ft 7 in (2.01 m)
- Listed weight: 331 lb (150 kg)

Career information
- High school: Bishop Montgomery (Torrance, California)
- College: New Mexico
- NFL draft: 2006: 7th round, 216th overall pick

Career history
- Buffalo Bills (2006); Atlanta Falcons (2007); New York Giants (2009)*
- * Offseason or practice squad member only

Career NFL statistics
- Games played: 16
- Games started: 9
- Stats at Pro Football Reference

Terrance J. Pennington (born September 25, 1983) is an American former professional football player who was a guard and offensive tackle in the National Football League (NFL). He was selected by the Buffalo Bills in the seventh round of the 2006 NFL draft. He played college football for the New Mexico Lobos.

Pennington was also a member of the Atlanta Falcons and New York Giants.

== Professional career ==
Pre-draft measurables
| Height | Weight | Arm length | Hand span | 40-yard dash | 10-yard split | 20-yard split | 20-yard shuttle | Three-cone drill | Vertical jump | Broad jump | Bench press |
|---|---|---|---|---|---|---|---|---|---|---|---|
| 6 ft 7 1/4 in (2.01 m) | 325 lb (147 kg) | 36 in (0.91 m) | 10 1/4 in (0.26 m) | 5.25 s | 1.80 s | 3.01 s | 4.67 s | 8.05 s | 28.5 in (0.72 m) | 8 ft 6 in (2.59 m) | 28 reps |
All values from NFL Combine/Pro Day

=== Buffalo Bills ===
Pennington was selected in the 2006 NFL draft out of the University of New Mexico. He was picked in the seventh round with the 216th overall pick. He took over as the starting right tackle position for the Bills midway through the 2006 season.

Pennington was released by the Bills during final roster cuts on September 1, 2007.

=== Atlanta Falcons ===
On October 23, 2007, the Atlanta Falcons signed Pennington following a season-ending injury to Renardo Foster. He played in five games for the Falcons before being placed on injured reserve with a torn pectoral on December 26.

On August 30, 2008, the Falcons released him.

=== New York Giants ===
After spending the 2008 season out of football, Pennington was signed by the New York Giants on January 16, 2009. He was waived on August 31.
