= Rian Lindell =

American football player (born 1977)

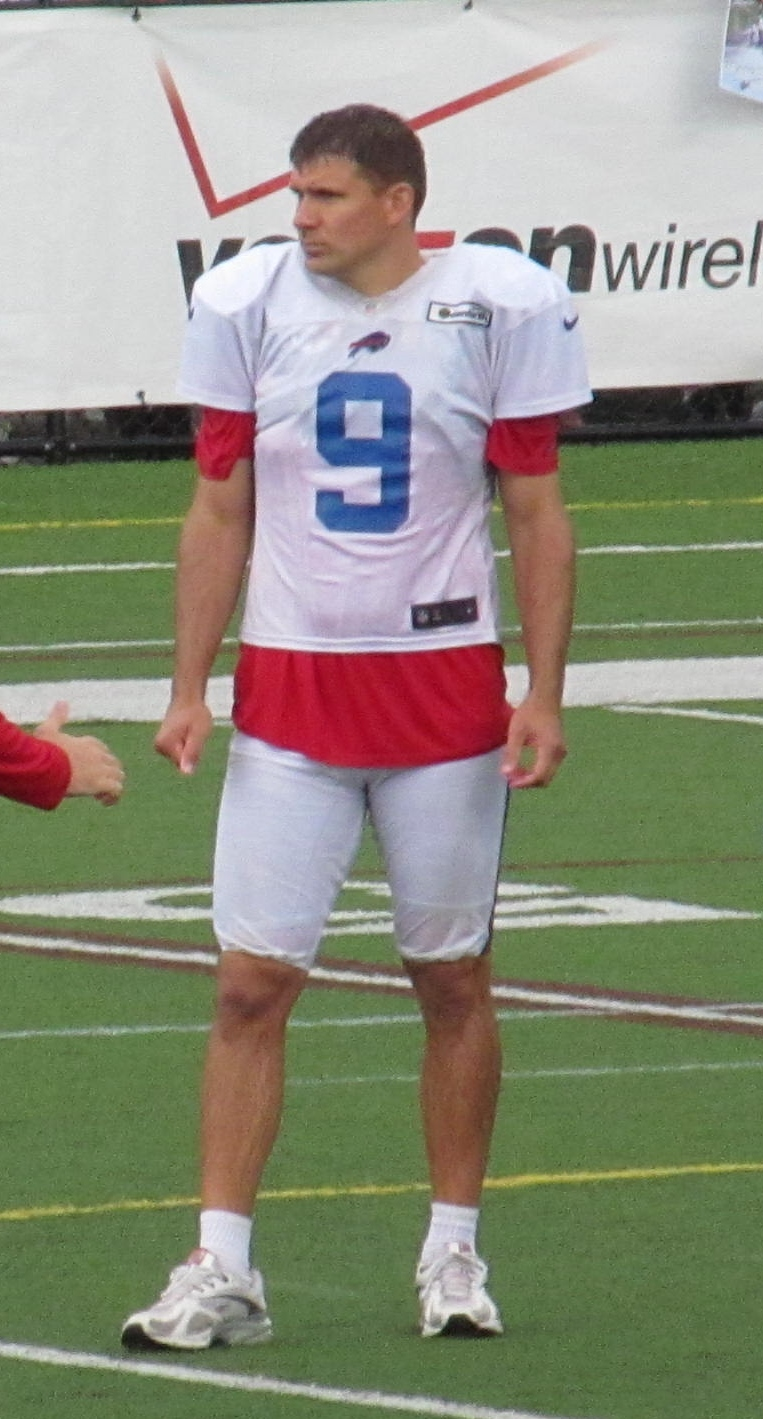
- Lindell with the Buffalo Bills in 2012

No. 9, 4
- Position: Placekicker

Personal information
- Born: January 20, 1977 (age 49); Portland, Oregon, U.S.
- Listed height: 6 ft 3 in (1.91 m)
- Listed weight: 227 lb (103 kg)

Career information
- High school: Mountain View (Vancouver, Washington)
- College: Washington State (1995–1999)
- NFL draft: 2000: undrafted

Career history
- Dallas Cowboys (2000)*; Seattle Seahawks (2000−2002); Buffalo Bills (2003−2012); Tampa Bay Buccaneers (2013)
- * Offseason or practice squad member only

Awards and highlights
- Second-team All-Pac-10 (1999); NFL record: Most consecutive extra points made to start a career: 321; Highest career extra point %: 99.8% (minimum 200 career extra point attempts)

Career NFL statistics
- Field goals made: 306
- Field goals attempted: 377
- Field goal %: 81.2%
- Extra points made: 432
- Extra points attempted: 433
- Extra point %: 99.8%
- Longest field goal: 56
- Points scored: 1,350
- Touchbacks: 69
- Stats at Pro Football Reference

Rian David Lindell (born January 20, 1977) is an American former professional football player who was a placekicker in the National Football League (NFL) for the Seattle Seahawks, Buffalo Bills and Tampa Bay Buccaneers. He played college football for the Washington State Cougars.

== Early life ==
Lindell studied in Pacific Junior High School (now Pacific Middle School) in Vancouver, Washington, and was coached by Mike Daltoso. He later attended Mountain View High School, where he played as a placekicker, tight end and defensive end in football, receiving All-league honors on special teams and defense as a senior. He also lettered in baseball, playing as a pitcher and receiving All-state honors as a third baseman in his senior season.

== College career ==
Lindell walked on at Washington State University. He was named the starter as a sophomore, on a team that included quarterback Ryan Leaf, finishing with a school record 58 extra points scored, while making 12 out of 17 field goals.

He also played in the 1998 Rose Bowl at the end of his sophomore season, losing to a Michigan team that included future NFL players Brian Griese, Tom Brady (who was Griese's backup for the game) and Charles Woodson.

He became a three-year starter and finished fourth (206 points) on the school's career scoring list

== Professional career ==
=== Dallas Cowboys ===
Lindell was signed as an undrafted free agent by the Dallas Cowboys after the 2000 NFL draft. He lost the placekicker job after competing with Tim Seder and was waived before the season started.

=== Seattle Seahawks ===
On September 26, 2000, he was signed by the Seattle Seahawks as a free agent. He started for three seasons and made 74.4% (58 of 78) of his field-goal attempts.

=== Buffalo Bills ===
On March 24, 2003, he was signed as a restricted free agent by the Buffalo Bills to replace Mike Hollis, who was allowed to leave in free agency. The Seahawks decided not to match the offer and lost Lindell without receiving any compensation.

He was generally regarded as having a stronger but slightly less accurate leg than Hollis. In the 2006 season, Lindell converted 23 out of 25 field goal attempts, at 92%, tied for the league. On November 26, 2006, Lindell kicked the game-winning field goal against the Jacksonville Jaguars to complete Buffalo's upset over Jacksonville.

On November 11, 2007, Lindell kicked a game-winning field goal to allow Buffalo to win 13–10 over the Miami Dolphins. On Sunday, December 2, 2007, Lindell kicked a game-winning field goal against the Washington Redskins. Lindell was 5/5 in field goal attempts on that day. When kicking the game-winning field goal, Lindell was "iced" twice by Washington head coach Joe Gibbs, which drew an unsportsmanlike conduct penalty against Washington, making the field goal 15 yards shorter.

In week 3 of the 2008 season, Lindell had a game-winning field goal on the final play of the game vs. the Oakland Raiders, which allowed Buffalo to move to 3–0. Later, in week 11 of the season, Lindell missed a 47-yard field goal with 38 seconds left. As a result, the Cleveland Browns ran the clock out to secure a 29–27 victory.

On December 9, 2007, Rian Lindell set the record for the most consecutive field goals made in Buffalo Bills history. He had played in all 64 games for the Bills since 2003 (until the middle of the 2011 season) and holds a Bills record with 83.04 field goal percentage.

On November 29, 2009, Lindell successfully made a 56-yard field goal against rivals Miami Dolphins. This was not only Lindell's longest field goal of his career but also tied Houston Texans' kicker Kris Brown for longest successful field goal in the league for the 2009 season, until Sebastian Janikowski made a 61-yarder in week 17.

On November 7, 2010, Lindell had an extra point blocked against the Chicago Bears, ending his streak at 321 successful extra points, an NFL record for most consecutive extra points to start a career.

On September 25, 2011, Lindell booted two field goals against the Patriots, including a 28-yard game winner to give the Bills their first win in 15 games vs. the Patriots.

On November 6, 2011, Lindell injured his shoulder while trying to trip up New York Jets running back Joe McKnight. He missed the remainder of the season. On February 7, 2012, the Bills announced that Lindell had agreed to a four-year contract for $10 million.

On August 19, 2013, he was released after being passed on the depth chart sixth-round draft choice Dustin Hopkins. He left as the most accurate field goal kicker (83.3%), second in franchise history in scoring (979) and broke team records by connecting on 18 straight field goals and 225 consecutive extra-point attempts.

=== Tampa Bay Buccaneers ===
On August 20, 2013, Lindell signed as a free agent with the Tampa Bay Buccaneers to replace Connor Barth, who had suffered a torn Achilles tendon injury. He made 23 out of 29 field goals with a long one of 54 yards. He wasn't re-signed after the season.

== Career regular season statistics ==
Career high/best bolded

Regular season statistics
Season	Team (record)	G	FGM	FGA	%	<20	20-29	30-39	40-49	50+	LNG	BLK	XPM	XPA	%	PTS
2000	SEA (6–10)	12	15	17	88.2	0–0	4–5	1–1	7–8	3–3	52	0	25	25	**100.0**	70
2001	SEA (9–7)	**16**	20	32	62.5	0–0	7–8	4–5	6–14	3–5	54	0	33	33	**100.0**	93
2002	SEA (7–9)	**16**	23	29	79.3	**1–1**	9–9	8–10	4–5	1–4	52	0	38	38	**100.0**	107
2003	BUF (6–10)	**16**	17	24	70.8	0–0	11–12	3–3	3–7	0–2	44	0	24	24	**100.0**	75
2004	BUF (9–7)	**16**	24	28	85.7	0–0	**13–14**	10–11	1–3	0–0	43	0	**45**	**45**	**100.0**	117
2005	BUF (5–11)	**16**	29	35	82.9	0–0	8–9	11–13	7–10	3–3	53	0	26	26	**100.0**	113
2006	BUF (7–9)	**16**	23	25	**92.0**	0–0	8–8	5–5	8–10	2–2	53	0	33	33	**100.0**	102
2007	BUF (7–9)	**16**	24	27	88.9	0–0	11–11	7–7	4–6	2–3	52	0	24	24	**100.0**	96
2008	BUF (7–9)	**16**	**30**	**38**	78.9	**1–1**	7–8	11–11	**10–15**	1–3	53	**1**	34	34	**100.0**	**124**
2009	BUF (6–10)	**16**	28	33	84.8	0–0	12–12	9–9	6–9	1–3	**56**	0	24	24	**100.0**	108
2010	BUF (4–12)	**16**	16	21	76.2	**1–1**	6–6	5–6	2–3	2–5	51	**1**	31	32	96.9	79
2011	BUF (6–10)	8	13	15	86.7	0–0	6–6	2–3	5–6	0–0	49	**1**	25	25	**100.0**	64
2012	BUF (6–10)	**16**	21	24	87.5	**1–1**	3–3	10–11	6–7	1–2	50	0	39	39	**100.0**	102
2013	TB (4–12)	**16**	23	29	79.3	0–0	3–3	**12–14**	4–6	**4–6**	54	0	31	31	**100.0**	100
Career (14 seasons)		212	306	377	81.2	4–4	108–114	98–109	73–109	23–41	56	3	432	433	99.8	1350

== Personal life ==
Lindell is married to his wife Johna. He is a fan of baseball's St. Louis Cardinals. He was a part of the Alpha Kappa Lambda fraternity in college. He is now a physical education teacher and a football coach at Eastlake High School in Sammamish, Washington.
