= Keith Ellison (American football) =

American football player (born 1984)

No. 56
- Position: Linebacker

Personal information
- Born: February 6, 1984 (age 42); Los Angeles, California, U.S.
- Listed height: 6 ft 0 in (1.83 m)
- Listed weight: 229 lb (104 kg)

Career information
- High school: Union (Redondo Beach, California)
- College: Oregon State
- NFL draft: 2006: 6th round, 178th overall pick

Career history
- Buffalo Bills (2006–2010)

Awards and highlights
- First-team All-Pac-10 (2005); Second-team JUCO All-American (2003)

Career NFL statistics
- Total tackles: 265
- Sacks: 2
- Fumble recoveries: 2
- Interceptions: 2
- Stats at Pro Football Reference

Keith Martin Ellison (born February 6, 1984) is an American former professional football player who was a linebacker in the National Football League (NFL). He was selected by the Buffalo Bills in the sixth round of the 2006 NFL draft. He played college football for the Oregon State Beavers.

== Early life ==
Ellison attended Redondo Union High School in Redondo Beach, California and was a student and a standout in football and basketball. In football, he played quarterback, linebacker and safety, and as a senior, he was named the Bay League's Defensive Player of the Year and was an All-California Interscholastic Federation selection. In basketball, he was a four-year letterman and starter. Keith Ellison graduated from Redondo Union High School in 2002.

== College career ==
He played 2 years of college football at Oregon State University, one year at El Camino College and 2 years at San Diego State University, and was selected in the 6th round of the 2006 NFL draft as the 178th overall pick.

== Professional career ==
Pre-draft measurables
Height	Weight	Arm length	Hand span	40-yard dash	10-yard split	20-yard split	20-yard shuttle	Three-cone drill	Vertical jump	Broad jump	Bench press
6 ft 1 1/2 in (1.87 m)	235 lb (107 kg)	30 3/8 in (0.77 m)	9 1/2 in (0.24 m)	4.74 s	1.65 s	2.81 s	4.16 s	6.75 s	34.0 in (0.86 m)	9 ft 7 in (2.92 m)	24 reps
All values from NFL Combine/Pro Day

Ellison started his first NFL game in week two of the 2006 season, replacing the injured Takeo Spikes. Ellison went on to start 7 games for the Bills in 2006, filling in for both Takeo Spikes and Angelo Crowell because of injuries they suffered throughout the year. Ellison recorded 65 total tackles (33 solo), 1 sack, 1 interception, and 1 fumble recovery in 2006, his rookie campaign.

Ellison has spent the 2007 season as the starting weakside linebacker for the Bills. In his first three years at Buffalo he has recorded a total of 177 tackles, 2 interceptions, and 2 sacks.

A restricted free agent in the 2009 offseason, Ellison signed a one-year, $1.01 million contract with the Bills on March 25.

The Buffalo Bills announced March 4, 2010 that it has tendered a contract offer to restricted free agent linebacker Keith Ellison, a sixth-round pick in 2006. The tender is worth $1,176,000.

On November 27, 2010, Ellison was placed on injured reserve by the Bills. For the season with the Bills, Ellison played in eight games (starting two) and totaled 20 tackles.

== NFL career statistics ==
Legend
**Bold**	Career high

Year	Team	Games		Tackles					Interceptions					Fumbles			
Year	Team	GP	GS	Cmb	Solo	Ast	Sck	TFL	Int	Yds	TD	Lng	PD	FF	FR	Yds	TD
2006	BUF	14	7	65	33	**32**	**1.0**	**6**	**1**	**7**	0	**7**	2	0	**1**	0	0
2007	BUF	12	9	39	27	12	**1.0**	2	**1**	4	0	4	**5**	0	0	0	0
2008	BUF	**16**	**14**	**73**	**49**	24	0.0	2	0	0	0	0	2	0	**1**	0	0
2009	BUF	8	8	68	40	28	0.0	3	0	0	0	0	2	0	0	0	0
2010	BUF	8	2	20	15	5	0.0	0	0	0	0	0	1	0	0	0	0
Career		58	40	265	164	101	2.0	13	2	11	0	7	12	0	2	0	0

== Personal life ==
Ellison is the older brother of safety Kevin Ellison, who was selected out of the University of Southern California in the 2009 NFL draft; like his older brother, the younger Ellison was selected around the same time: in the 6th round, 189th overall, by the San Diego Chargers. Another brother, Chris, played for BYU in 1997 and 1998.

Ellison became a teacher at Adams Middle School. He teaches physical education, though he used to teach history, as well. He is now also the Redondo Union High School Varsity Football coach.
