= Joe Douse =

American baseball player

- Pitcher
- Born: April 30, 1930; Atlanta, Georgia, U.S.
- Died: August 10, 2012 (aged 82); Southfield, Michigan, U.S.
- Batted: R Threw: ?

Negro American League debut
- 1952, for the Kansas City Monarchs

Last appearance
- 1953, for the Kansas City Monarchs

Teams
- Kansas City Monarchs (1952–1953)

Joseph S. Douse (April 30, 1930 – August 10, 2012) was an American baseball pitcher for the Kansas City Monarchs of the Negro American League in 1952 and 1953.

Born in Atlanta, Georgia, Douse attended Booker T. Washington High School.

According to his recollections, he tossed a one-hitter against the Philadelphia Stars in 1952.

On August 10, 2012, he died in Southfield, Michigan.
