= Justin Phinisee =

American gridiron football player (born 1983)

No. 5, 32
- Position: Cornerback

Personal information
- Born: April 10, 1983 (age 43); Long Beach, California, U.S.
- Listed height: 5 ft 11 in (1.80 m)
- Listed weight: 199 lb (90 kg)

Career information
- College: Oregon
- NFL draft: 2006: 7th round, 235th overall pick

Career history
- Tampa Bay Buccaneers (2006)*; Kansas City Chiefs (2006)*; New England Patriots (2006)*; Kansas City Chiefs (2006–2007)*; St. Louis Rams (2007)*; Dallas Cowboys (2008)*; Winnipeg Blue Bombers (2008); Utah Blaze (2010); Wichita Wild (2014)
- * Offseason or practice squad member only

Justin Miles Phinisee (born April 10, 1983) is an American former football cornerback and punt returner. He was selected by the Tampa Bay Buccaneers in the seventh round of the 2006 NFL draft. He played college football at Oregon.

Phinisee was also a member of the Kansas City Chiefs, New England Patriots, St. Louis Rams, Dallas Cowboys, Winnipeg Blue Bombers, Utah Blaze, and Wichita Wild.
