= Kevin Ellison (American football) =

American football player (1987–2018)

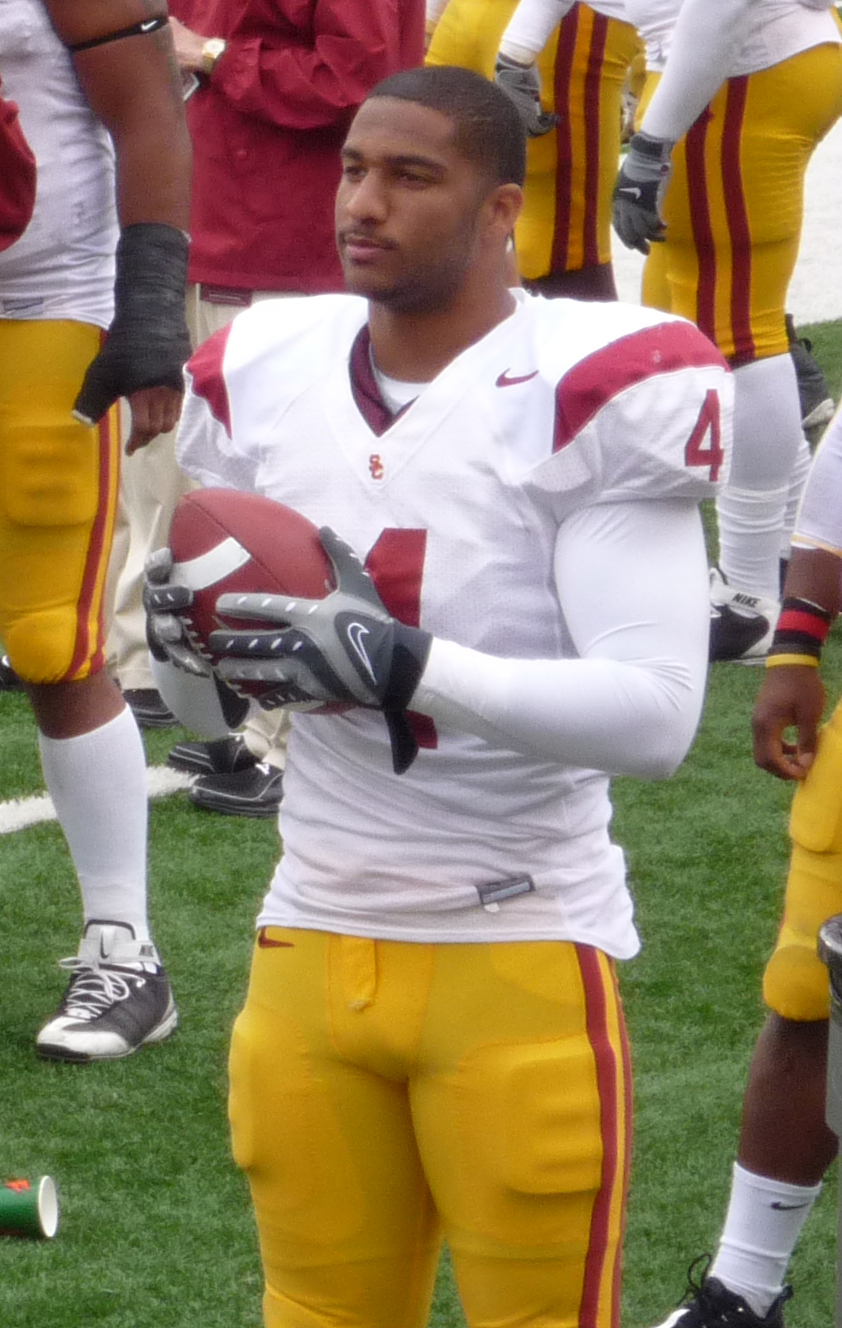
- Ellison with the USC Trojans in 2008

No. 25, 19
- Position: Safety / Linebacker

Personal information
- Born: January 8, 1987; Inglewood, California, U.S.
- Died: October 4, 2018 (aged 31); San Fernando Valley, California, U.S.
- Listed height: 6 ft 1 in (1.85 m)
- Listed weight: 221 lb (100 kg)

Career information
- High school: Redondo Union (Redondo Beach, California)
- College: USC
- NFL draft: 2009: 6th round, 189th overall pick

Career history
- San Diego Chargers (2009); Seattle Seahawks (2010)*; Spokane Shock (2012)
- * Offseason or practice squad member only

Awards and highlights
- 2× First-team All-Pac-10 (2007, 2008)

Career NFL statistics
- Total tackles: 52
- Sacks: 1
- Pass deflections: 3
- Stats at Pro Football Reference

Kevin Marcus Ellison (January 8, 1987 – October 4, 2018) was an American professional football player who was a safety in the National Football League (NFL). He was selected by the San Diego Chargers in the sixth round of the 2009 NFL draft. He played college football for the USC Trojans.

== Early life ==
Born in Inglewood, California, United States, Ellison attended Redondo Union High School, where he starred as a running back and linebacker. He achieved many honors and awards including Los Angeles Times All-South Bay/Westside Player of the Year, South Bay Daily Breeze All-Area Player of the Year, and All-Bay League MVP. He finished his high school career with a record 3,718 rushing yards on 578 carries and 297 tackles.

== College career ==
Ellison graduated a semester early from high school and enrolled at the University of Southern California in the spring of 2005 to pursue a social science economics degree. During his freshman season with the Trojans, he spent most of his time as a back up safety and on special teams, and was selected to The Sporting News Pac-10 All-Freshman first-team. In 2006, he became the team's starting strong safety, finishing with 64 tackles, one interception, and 1.5 sacks. He made the 2006 Collegefootballnews.com Sophomore All-American second-team and was an All-Pac-10 honorable mention. In 2007 Ellison started all 13 games, finishing with 57 tackles, two interceptions, and two sacks.

== Professional career ==
Pre-draft measurables
| Height | Weight | Arm length | Hand span | 40-yard dash | 10-yard split | 20-yard split | 20-yard shuttle | Vertical jump | Broad jump | Bench press |
|---|---|---|---|---|---|---|---|---|---|---|
| 6 ft 0 7/8 in (1.85 m) | 227 lb (103 kg) | 31 1/2 in (0.80 m) | 9 5/8 in (0.24 m) | 4.75 s | 1.59 s | 2.71 s | 4.15 s | 33.5 in (0.85 m) | 9 ft 4 in (2.84 m) | 32 reps |
All values from NFL Combine/Pro Day

=== San Diego Chargers ===
Ellison was selected by the San Diego Chargers in the sixth round of the 2009 NFL draft. He started his first NFL game in week 6 against the Denver Broncos and recorded 7 tackles. He was waived on June 21, 2010.

=== Seattle Seahawks ===
On June 22, 2010 Ellison was claimed off waivers by the Seattle Seahawks. He was waived on June 25, 2010 after failing his physical. He then cleared waivers and signed in order to "adjust contractual issues." Once again, he was united with his college coach. On September 5, 2010, Ellison was released by the Seahawks.

=== Spokane Shock ===
Ellison played for the Spokane Shock of the Arena Football League in 2012.

== Coaching career ==
September 2011: Ellison became the Defensive Coordinator at Cathedral High School in Los Angeles, CA and was joined by his brothers, Keith who coaches the Linebackers and Chris who coaches the Defensive Backs.

== Personal life ==
Ellison's brother, Keith, was a linebacker for the Buffalo Bills. Another brother, Chris, played for BYU in 1997 and 1998.

On May 24, 2010, Ellison was arrested on possession of a controlled substance in Redondo Beach, California after a bottle of unprescribed vicodin pills that he was taking for a recent knee injury was discovered in his car during a routine traffic stop; the charges were later dropped.

On June 14, 2012, Ellison was arrested again, this time for arson after starting an apartment fire in Liberty Lake, Washington which caused an estimated $50,000 worth of damage to the building. He claimed God told him to do it.

Ellison died in October 2018 at the age of 31. He had been walking on the Interstate 5 freeway when he was fatally struck by the driver of a vehicle.

In September 2019, researchers at Boston University posthumously determined that Ellison had Stage II chronic traumatic encephalopathy from studying tissue samples of his brain. He was one of at least 345 NFL players to be diagnosed after death with this disease, which is caused by repeated hits to the head.
