= Dale Robinson (American football) =

American football player (born 1983)

Profile
- Position: Linebacker

Personal information
- Born: September 2, 1983 (age 43); Brooklyn, New York, U.S.
- Listed height: 6 ft 1 in (1.85 m)
- Listed weight: 240 lb (109 kg)

Career information
- High school: Holy Cross (Queens, New York)
- College: Arizona State (2004–2005)
- NFL draft: 2006: undrafted

Career history
- Indianapolis Colts (2006)*; Arizona Rattlers (2010)
- * Offseason or practice squad member only

Awards and highlights
- Pac-10 Co-Defensive Player of the Year (2005)
- Stats at ArenaFan.com

Dale Robinson (born September 2, 1983) is an American former football linebacker. He played college football for the Arizona State Sun Devils and was named the Pac-10 Co-Defensive Player of the Year (with Haloti Ngata) in 2005.

== Early life ==
Dale Robinson was born on September 2, 1983, in Brooklyn, New York. He played high school football at Holy Cross High School in Queens, New York. He set a school record with 118 tackles his senior year, earning Queens Player of the Year and second-team all-state honors.

== College career ==
Robinson played college football at Division II C.W. Post from 2001 to 2002. As a freshman, he led the team in tackles with 97. He transferred to play at Glendale Community College in 2003. Robinson was named the Western States Football League Defensive Player of the Year after posting 10 sacks, three forced fumbles, two fumbles recoveries, and a team-leading 114 tackles.

Robinson then transferred to play for the Arizona State Sun Devils. He started all 12 games at linebacker in 2004, totaling 50 solo tackles, 43 assisted tackles, 4.5 sacks, and one interception. He was named honorable mention All-Pac-10 Conference for his performance during the 2004 season. Robinson played in all 11 games, starting 10, during the 2005 season, accumulating 74 solo tackles, 41 assisted tackles, four sacks, three forced fumbles, one fumble recovery, and one pass breakup. He led the Pac-10 in solo tackles and shared the Pac-10 Co-Defensive Player of the Year award with Haloti Ngata.

== Professional career ==
Robison was criticized by pro scouts for his lack of size and speed. He posted a "dismal" 4.76 second 40-yard dash at the NFL Combine. After going undrafted in the 2010 NFL draft, Robison signed with the Indianapolis Colts on May 1. He was waived on August 2 but re-signed on August 13. During the preseason, he made six solo tackles and two assisted tackles. Robison was waived again on September 3, 2006, before the start of the regular season.

Robinson was assigned to the Arizona Rattlers of the Arena Football League (AFL) on March 15, 2010. He was placed on reassignment on April 14 but assigned to the Rattlers again on June 17. Overall during the 2010 AFL season, he recorded five solo tackles, two assisted tackles, one sack, one interception, and one blocked kick. On August 16, 2010, he was placed on the team's suspended list.

== Personal life ==
Robinon's father, Dale Edward Robinson, was a corrections officer at Rikers Island for 15 years.
