= Aaron Merz =

American football player (born 1983)

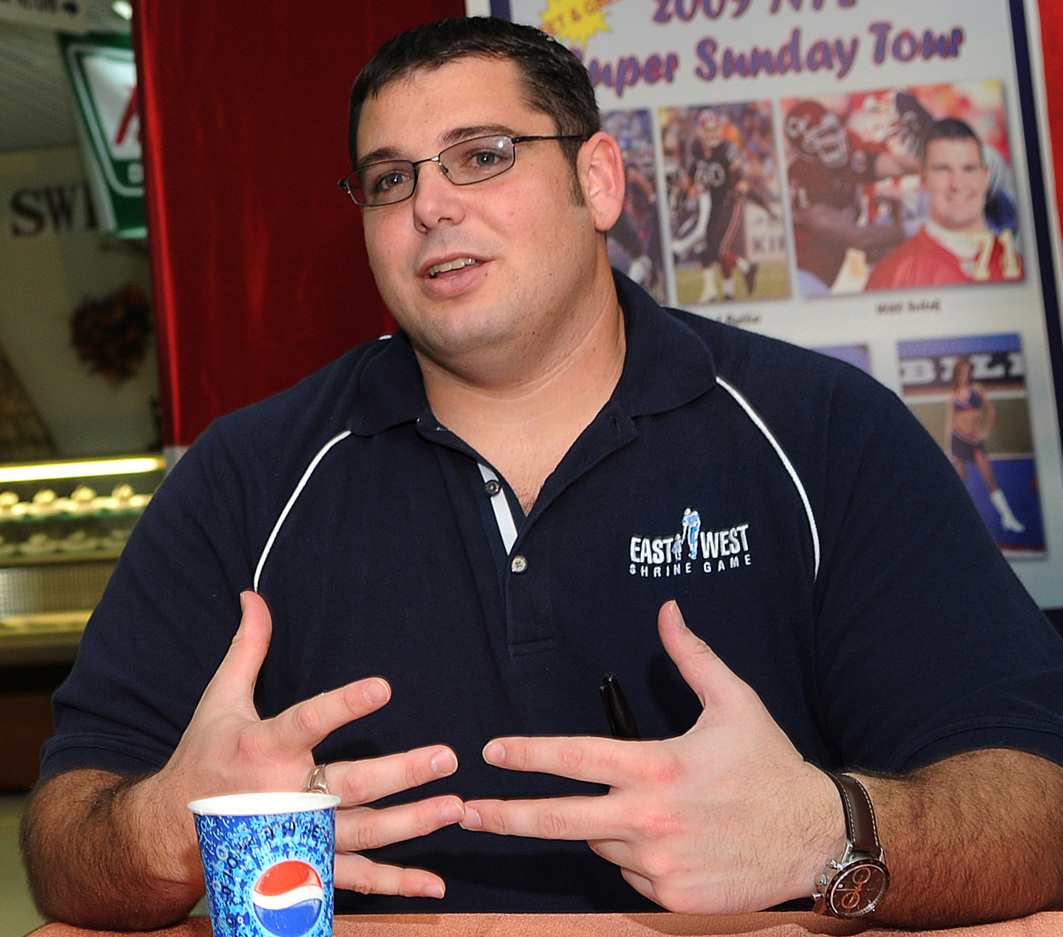
- Merz at Camp As Sayliyah in 2009

No. 62
- Positions: Guard, center

Personal information
- Born: August 27, 1983 (age 43); Bakersfield, California, U.S.
- Listed height: 6 ft 4 in (1.93 m)
- Listed weight: 325 lb (147 kg)

Career information
- High school: Wasco (Wasco, California)
- College: California
- NFL draft: 2006: 7th round, 248th overall pick

Career history
- Buffalo Bills (2006–2007)

Awards and highlights
- Second-team All-Pac-10 (2005)

Career NFL statistics
- Games played: 7
- Games started: 1
- Stats at Pro Football Reference

Aaron Andrew Merz (born August 27, 1983) is an American former professional football player who was an offensive lineman in the National Football League (NFL). He was selected by the Buffalo Bills in the seventh round of the 2006 NFL draft. He played college football for the California Golden Bears.

== Early life ==
Merz attended Wasco High School in Wasco, California and was a letterman in football, basketball, and golf. In football, he won All-League honors as both an offensive lineman and as a defensive lineman.

== College career ==
He played college football at the University of California, Berkeley, where he earned a B.A. in sociology in 2005. Merz joined the Golden Bears as a walk-on in 2001 and was given a scholarship as reward for his elevated role with the team following the 2003 season.

== Professional career ==
Pre-draft measurables
Height	Weight	40-yard dash	20-yard shuttle	Three-cone drill	Vertical jump	Broad jump	Bench press
6 ft 3 1/2 in (1.92 m)	326 lb (148 kg)	5.60 s	4.96 s	7.65 s	26.5 in (0.67 m)	7 ft 7 in (2.31 m)	16 reps
All values from Pro Day

Prior to the 2006 NFL draft, Merz scored 39/50 on the NFL Scouting Combine's standard Wonderlic Test. After being released by Buffalo in 2008, Merz enlisted with the U.S. Peace Corps. He served as a volunteer in Zambia from February 2009 to February 2010 before being forced to return to America for medical purposes. Aaron has since returned to Zambia with his wife to operate the NGO she founded, IIM International which is dedicated to providing improved educational access to orphans and vulnerable children.
