= Walter Stith =

American gridiron football player (born 1983)

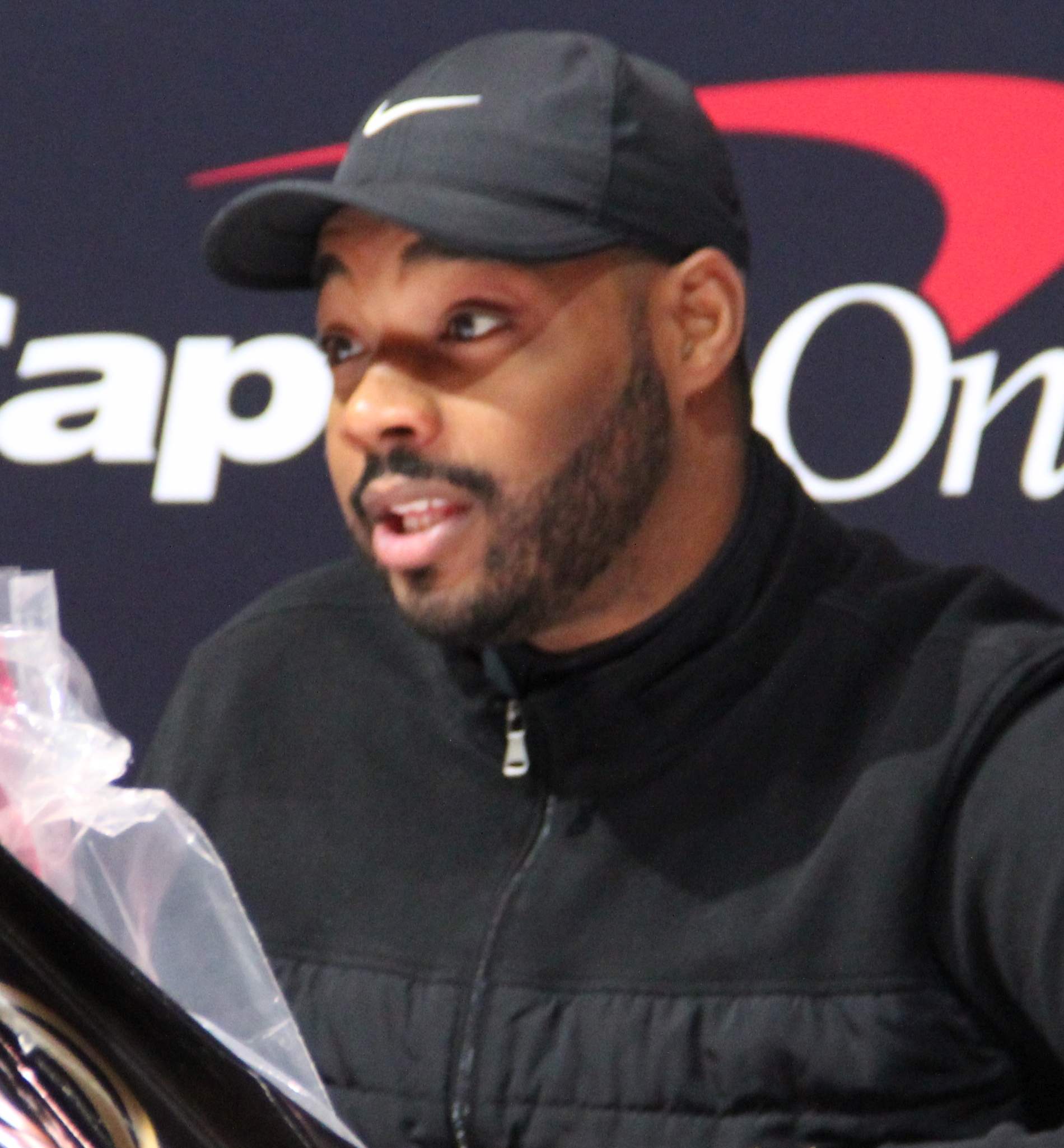
- Stith in 2018

No. 70
- Position: Offensive tackle

Personal information
- Born: January 2, 1983 (age 43); Atlanta, Georgia, U.S.
- Listed height: 6 ft 9 in (2.06 m)
- Listed weight: 295 lb (134 kg)

Career information
- College: North Carolina A&T

Career history
- 2006: Cleveland Browns
- 2006–2007: Buffalo Bills
- 2008–2009: BC Lions

Walter Stith (born January 2, 1983) is an American football offensive tackle who played for the Buffalo Bills of the National Football League. He was originally signed by the Cleveland Browns as an undrafted free agent in 2006. He played collegiately at North Carolina A&T. Stith signed as a free agent with the BC Lions of the Canadian Football League in May 2008. He was released in July 2009.
