= 2008 Buffalo Bills season =

49th season in franchise history

- Owner: Ralph Wilson
- General manager: Russ Brandon
- Head coach: Dick Jauron
- Home stadium: Ralph Wilson Stadium; Rogers Centre

Results
- Record: 7–9
- Division place: 4th AFC East
- Playoffs: Did not qualify
- Pro Bowlers: T Jason Peters; RB Marshawn Lynch

The 2008 Buffalo Bills season was the 39th season for the team in the National Football League (NFL) and their 49th season overall. The team finished with a record of 7–9 for the third consecutive year. It started the season 5–1 before a 2–8 stretch to finish the season.

After a 5–1 start to the season, starting quarterback Trent Edwards suffered a concussion in week 5 at Arizona after an Adrian Wilson hit. Edwards had started the year throwing 4 touchdowns and two interceptions through the first five games. After the injury, he threw 7 touchdowns and 8 interceptions, before missing two of the final four games of the season with a groin injury. After their 4–0 start, the Bills won only three of their final 12 games of the year.

Despite strong years from second-year running back Marshawn Lynch (1,036 rushing yards, 1,336 yards from scrimmage) and wide receiver Lee Evans (1,017 receiving yards), the team was eliminated from playoff contention in week 15, which secured their ninth straight year without a playoff appearance.

== Offseason ==
=== Acquisitions ===
The Bills signed Minnesota Vikings defensive tackle Spencer Johnson, New York Jets fullback Darian Barnes and New York Giants linebacker Kawika Mitchell in free agency.

Also, the Bills traded for Jacksonville Jaguars defensive tackle Marcus Stroud, sending Baltimore's 2008 3rd round selection, and Chicago's 5th round selection.

- DT Marcus Stroud – Acquired via trade with the Jacksonville Jaguars in exchange for 2008 3rd and 5th round selections.
- LB Kawika Mitchell – Signed as a free agent from the New York Giants.
- DT Spencer Johnson – Signed as a free agent from the Minnesota Vikings.
- TE Courtney Anderson – Signed as a free agent from the Oakland Raiders. Released on August 30.
- CB William James – Signed as a free agent from the Philadelphia Eagles. Released on August 30, after being beaten out in training camp.

=== Departures ===
- DT Anthony Hargrove – Suspended by league for one year January 24
- RB Anthony Thomas – Released on February 27
- DT Larry Tripplett – Released on February 29
- LB Coy Wire – Released on February 27, failed physical
- WR Peerless Price – Released on February 14
- WR Sam Aiken – Signed with the New England Patriots as a free agent
- CB Jason Webster – Signed with the New England Patriots as a free agent
- TE Michael Gaines – Signed with the Detroit Lions as a free agent

=== NFL draft ===
Buffalo found some impact players in the 2008 NFL draft. Leodis McKelvin was named to the Sporting News All-NFL team in his rookie year; he became a dynamic kick- and punt-return specialist. Demetress Bell eventually won a starting job at offensive tackle in Buffalo, a position he held for four seasons. Stevie Johnson had a breakout year in 2010; he became the first receiver in Bills history to gain 1,000 receiving yards in consecutive seasons.

2008 Buffalo Bills draft
| Round | Pick | Player | Position | College | Notes |
| 1 | 11 | Leodis McKelvin | CB | Troy | |
| 2 | 41 | James Hardy | WR | Indiana | |
| 3 | 72 | Chris Ellis | DE | Virginia Tech | |
| 4 | 114 | Reggie Corner | CB | Akron | |
| 4 | 132 | Derek Fine | TE | Kansas | Supplemental |
| 5 | 147 | Alvin Bowen | LB | Iowa State | |
| 6 | 179 | Xavier Omon | RB | NW Missouri State | |
| 7 | 219 | Demetress Bell | OT | Northwestern State | |
| 7 | 224 | Stevie Johnson | WR | Kentucky | |
| 7 | 251 | Kennard Cox | CB | Pittsburgh | Supplemental |
Made roster † Pro Football Hall of Fame * Made at least one Pro Bowl during career

== Personnel ==
=== Staff/coaches ===
2008 Buffalo Bills staff
| Front office: Owner/CEO/president - Ralph Wilson; Head coaches: Head coach - Dick Jauron; Assistant head coach/special teams coordinator - Bobby April; Assistant to the head coach/special projects - Chuck Lester; Offensive coaches: Offensive coordinator - Turk Schonert; Quarterbacks - Alex Van Pelt; Running game coordinator/running backs - Eric Studesville; Wide receivers - Tyke Tolbert; Tight ends - Charlie Coiner; Offensive line - Sean Kugler; Assistant offensive line - Ray Brown; Offensive quality control - Nathaniel Hackett | Defensive coaches: Defensive coordinator - Perry Fewell; Defensive line - Bill Kollar; Linebackers - Matt Sheldon; Defensive backs - George Catavolos; Defensive/special teams assistant - Cannon Matthews; Defensive quality control - Adrian White; Special teams coaches: Special teams assistant/assistant linebackers - DeMontie Cross; Strength and conditioning: Head strength and conditioning - John Allaire |

=== Final roster ===
2008 Buffalo Bills roster
| Quarterbacks (QB): 5 Trent Edwards; 10 Gibran Hamdan; 7 J. P. Losman; Running backs (RB): 36 Bruce Hall; 22 Fred Jackson KR/PR; 23 Marshawn Lynch; 38 Corey McIntyre FB; 44 Xavier Omon; Wide receivers (WR): 83 Lee Evans; 17 Justin Jenkins; 13 Stevie Johnson; 11 Roscoe Parrish PR; 82 Josh Reed; Tight ends (TE): 87 Derek Fine; 84 Robert Royal; 80 Derek Schouman; 88 Jonathan Stupar | Offensive linemen (OL): 77 Demetress Bell T; 60 Brad Butler G; 73 Kirk Chambers G/T; 66 Derrick Dockery G; 67 Melvin Fowler C; 71 Jason Peters T; 75 Duke Preston C; 79 Jonathan Scott T; 68 Langston Walker T; 65 Jason Whittle G; Defensive linemen (DL): 96 Copeland Bryan DE; 92 Ryan Denney DE; 91 Spencer Johnson DT; 90 Chris Kelsay DE; 75 Corey Mace DT; 99 Marcus Stroud DT; 95 Kyle Williams DT | Linebackers (LB): 57 Jon Corto OLB; 54 Blake Costanzo OLB; 56 Keith Ellison OLB; 58 Teddy Lehman MLB; 59 Kawika Mitchell OLB; 51 Paul Posluszny MLB; Defensive backs (DB): 27 Reggie Corner CB; 35 Dustin Fox CB; 33 Jabari Greer CB; 24 Terrence McGee CB; 21 Leodis McKelvin CB/KR; 43 Bryan Scott FS; 30 Ko Simpson FS; 29 John Wendling SS; 20 Donte Whitner SS; 37 George Wilson SS; Special teams (ST): 9 Rian Lindell K; 8 Brian Moorman P; 72 Ryan Neill LS | Practice squad: 76 Chris Denman T; 49 Vince Hall LB; 18 C.J. Hawthorne WR; 15 Felton Huggins WR; 85 Mike Jefferson WR; 62 Brandon Rodd G; 98 Marcus Smith DE; Reserve: 16 Matt Baker QB (IR); 50 Alvin Bowen LB (IR); 53 Marcus Buggs LB (IR); 55 Angelo Crowell LB (IR); 52 John DiGiorgio LB (IR); 81 James Hardy WR (IR); 93 Chris Ellis DE (IR); 97 John McCargo DT (IR); 94 Aaron Schobel DE (IR); 26 Ashton Youboty CB (IR); Rookies in italics 53 active, 10 reserve, 7 practice squad |

== Preseason ==
| Week | Date | Opponent | Result | Record | Venue | Recap |
|---|---|---|---|---|---|---|
| 1 | August 9 | at Washington Redskins | L 14–17 | 0–1 | FedExField | Recap |
| 2 | August 14 | Pittsburgh Steelers | W 24–21 | 1–1 | (Canada) Rogers Centre (Toronto) | Recap |
| 3 | August 24 | at Indianapolis Colts | W 20–7 | 2–1 | Lucas Oil Stadium | Recap |
| 4 | August 28 | Detroit Lions | L 6–14 | 2–2 | Ralph Wilson Stadium | Recap |

== Regular season ==
One regular season home game per year was played at the Rogers Centre in Toronto, Ontario as part of a five-year deal. For 2008, December 7's matchup with the Miami Dolphins was staged in Toronto.

=== Schedule ===
| Week | Date | Opponent | Result | Record | Venue | Recap |
|---|---|---|---|---|---|---|
| 1 | September 7 | Seattle Seahawks | **W** 34–10 | 1–0 | Ralph Wilson Stadium | Recap |
| 2 | September 14 | at Jacksonville Jaguars | **W** 20–16 | 2–0 | Jacksonville Municipal Stadium | Recap |
| 3 | September 21 | Oakland Raiders | **W** 24–23 | 3–0 | Ralph Wilson Stadium | Recap |
| 4 | September 28 | at St. Louis Rams | **W** 31–14 | 4–0 | Edward Jones Dome | Recap |
| 5 | October 5 | at Arizona Cardinals | **L** 17–41 | 4–1 | University of Phoenix Stadium | Recap |
| 6 | Bye | | | | | |
| 7 | October 19 | San Diego Chargers | **W** 23–14 | 5–1 | Ralph Wilson Stadium | Recap |
| 8 | October 26 | at **Miami Dolphins** | **L** 16–25 | 5–2 | Dolphin Stadium | Recap |
| 9 | November 2 | **New York Jets** | **L** 17–26 | 5–3 | Ralph Wilson Stadium | Recap |
| 10 | November 9 | at **New England Patriots** | **L** 10–20 | 5–4 | Gillette Stadium | Recap |
| 11 | November 17 | Cleveland Browns | **L** 27–29 | 5–5 | Ralph Wilson Stadium | Recap |
| 12 | November 23 | at Kansas City Chiefs | **W** 54–31 | 6–5 | Arrowhead Stadium | Recap |
| 13 | November 30 | San Francisco 49ers | **L** 3–10 | 6–6 | Ralph Wilson Stadium | Recap |
| 14 | December 7 | **Miami Dolphins** | **L** 3–16 | 6–7 | (Canada) Rogers Centre (Toronto) | Recap |
| 15 | December 14 | at **New York Jets** | **L** 27–31 | 6–8 | Giants Stadium | Recap |
| 16 | December 21 | at Denver Broncos | **W** 30–23 | 7–8 | Invesco Field at Mile High | Recap |
| 17 | December 28 | **New England Patriots** | **L** 0–13 | 7–9 | Ralph Wilson Stadium | Recap |

Note: Intra-division opponents are in bold text.

== Standings ==
AFC East
| | W | L | T | PCT | DIV | CONF | PF | PA | STK |
|---|---|---|---|---|---|---|---|---|---|
| ^{(3)} Miami Dolphins | 11 | 5 | 0 | .688 | 4–2 | 8–4 | 345 | 317 | W5 |
| New England Patriots | 11 | 5 | 0 | .688 | 4–2 | 7–5 | 410 | 309 | W4 |
| New York Jets | 9 | 7 | 0 | .563 | 4–2 | 7–5 | 405 | 356 | L2 |
| Buffalo Bills | 7 | 9 | 0 | .438 | 0–6 | 5–7 | 336 | 342 | L1 |

== Regular season ==
=== Week 1: vs. Seattle Seahawks ===
| Quarter | 1 | 2 | 3 | 4 | Total |
|---|---|---|---|---|---|
| Seahawks | 0 | 7 | 3 | 0 | 10 |
| Bills | 7 | 13 | 14 | 0 | 34 |

at Ralph Wilson Stadium, Orchard Park, New York

- Game time: 1:00 PM EDT
- Game weather: 66 °F (19 °C) (cloudy)
- Game attendance: 71,194
- Referee: Walt Coleman
- TV announcers (Fox): Ron Pitts, Tony Boselli, and Charissa Thompson

The Bills began their 2008 campaign at home against the Seattle Seahawks. In the first quarter, Buffalo drew first blood as running back Marshawn Lynch got a 21-yard touchdown run. In the second quarter, the Bills increased their lead with wide receiver/punt returner Roscoe Parrish returning a punt 63 yards for a touchdown. The Seahawks responded with quarterback Matt Hasselbeck completing a 20-yard touchdown pass to wide receiver Nate Burleson. Buffalo closed out the half with kicker Rian Lindell getting a 35-yard and a 38-yard field goal. In the third quarter, Seattle responded with kicker Olindo Mare nailing a 45-yard field goal. Afterwards, Buffalo dug into their bag of tricks. Appearing to attempt a 32-yard field goal, holder Brian Moorman completed a 19-yard touchdown pass to defensive end Ryan Denney. The Bills pulled away with quarterback Trent Edwards completing a 30-yard touchdown pass to tight end Robert Royal.

With this win, the Bills started their season with a 1–0 record.

=== Week 2: at Jacksonville Jaguars ===
| Quarter | 1 | 2 | 3 | 4 | Total |
|---|---|---|---|---|---|
| Bills | 7 | 3 | 0 | 10 | 20 |
| Jaguars | 0 | 3 | 10 | 3 | 16 |

at Jacksonville Municipal Stadium, Jacksonville, Florida

- Game time: 1:00 PM EDT
- Game weather: 87 °F (31 °C) (Sunny & Humid)
- Game attendance: 65,167
- Referee: Scott Green
- TV announcers (CBS): Gus Johnson and Steve Tasker

Coming off an impressive home win over the Seahawks, the Bills flew to Jacksonville Municipal Stadium for a Week 2 duel with the Jacksonville Jaguars. In the first quarter, Buffalo drew first blood as RB Marshawn Lynch got an 11-yard TD run. In the second quarter, the Jaguars responded with kicker Josh Scobee getting a 28-yard field goal. The Bills closed the half with kicker Rian Lindell's a 21-yard field goal. In the third quarter, Jacksonville took the lead with RB Maurice Jones-Drew getting a 2-yard TD run and Scobee getting a 50-yard field goal. In the fourth quarter, the Jaguars increased their lead with Scobee nailing a 39-yard field goal. Buffalo rallied as QB Trent Edwards completed a 7-yard TD pass to rookie WR James Hardy, along with Lindell's yard field goal.

With yet another win, the Bills improved to their first 2–0 start since 2003.

=== Week 3: vs. Oakland Raiders ===
| Quarter | 1 | 2 | 3 | 4 | Total |
|---|---|---|---|---|---|
| Raiders | 6 | 3 | 7 | 7 | 23 |
| Bills | 0 | 7 | 0 | 17 | 24 |

at Ralph Wilson Stadium, Orchard Park, New York

- Game time: 1:00 PM EDT
- Game weather: 66 °F (19 °C) (partly cloudy)
- Game attendance: 71,297
- Referee: Carl Cheffers
- TV announcers (CBS): Don Criqui and Dan Fouts

Coming off their road win over the Jaguars, the Bills went home, donned their throwback uniforms, and played a Week 3 duel with the Oakland Raiders. In the first quarter, Buffalo trailed early as Raiders kicker Sebastian Janikowski got a 23-yard and a 35-yard field goal. In the second quarter, the Bills got on the board with RB Marshawn Lynch's 14-yard TD run. Oakland responded with Janikowski's 32-yard field goal.

In the third quarter, the Raiders increased their lead with QB JaMarcus Russell getting a 1-yard TD run. In the fourth quarter, Buffalo began to rally as Lynch got a 3-yard TD run. Oakland immediately responded with Russell completing an 84-yard TD pass to WR Johnnie Lee Higgins. Afterwards, the Bills completed its rally with QB Trent Edwards completing a 14-yard TD pass to WR Roscoe Parrish. Then, Buffalo sealed the win with kicker Rian Lindell nailing the game-winning 38-yard field goal.

With the win, the Bills improved to 3–0 for the first time since 1992. With the Patriots' loss to the Dolphins, the Bills are now in first place in the AFC East after 3 weeks.

Also, during halftime, former Bills DE Bruce Smith (the NFL's All-Time Sack Leader) was added to the Bills Wall of Fame.

=== Week 4: at St. Louis Rams ===
| Quarter | 1 | 2 | 3 | 4 | Total |
|---|---|---|---|---|---|
| Bills | 6 | 0 | 7 | 18 | 31 |
| Rams | 7 | 7 | 0 | 0 | 14 |

at Edward Jones Dome, St. Louis, Missouri

- Game time: 4:05 PM EDT
- Game weather: None (Domed Stadium)
- Game attendance: 61,017
- Referee: Tony Corrente
- TV announcers (CBS): Ian Eagle and Solomon Wilcots

Coming off their last-second home win over the Raiders, the Bills flew to the Edward Jones Dome for a Week 4 interconference duel with the winless St. Louis Rams. In the first quarter, Buffalo drew first blood as kicker Rian Lindell got a 45-yard field goal. The Rams responded with WR Donnie Avery getting a 37-yard TD run. The Bills answered with Lindell's 35-yard field goal. In the second quarter, St. Louis increased its lead with RB Steven Jackson getting a 29-yard TD run.

In the third quarter, Buffalo began to rally as RB Fred Jackson got a 22-yard TD run. In the fourth quarter, the Bills completed their comeback with CB Jabari Greer returning an interception 33 yards for a touchdown, QB Trent Edwards completing a 39-yard TD pass to WR Lee Evans, and Lindell nailing a 45-yard field goal.

With the win, Buffalo got its first 4–0 start since 1992.

=== Week 5: at Arizona Cardinals ===
| Quarter | 1 | 2 | 3 | 4 | Total |
|---|---|---|---|---|---|
| Bills | 0 | 14 | 3 | 0 | 17 |
| Cardinals | 7 | 17 | 7 | 10 | 41 |

at University of Phoenix Stadium, Glendale, Arizona

- Game time: 4:15 PM EST/2:15 PM MST
- Game weather: None (dome closed)
- Game attendance: 63,830
- Referee: Jerome Boger
- TV announcers (CBS): Bill Macatee and Steve Beuerlein

Coming off their road win over the Rams, the Bills flew to the University of Phoenix Stadium for a Week 5 interconference game with the Arizona Cardinals. In the first quarter, Buffalo trailed early as Cardinals QB Kurt Warner completed a 2-yard TD pass to WR Larry Fitzgerald. In the second quarter, Arizona increased its lead as RB Tim Hightower got a 17-yard TD run. The Bills responded as QB J.P. Losman completing an 87-yard TD pass to WR Lee Evans, yet the Cardinals replied with RB Edgerrin James getting a 1-yard TD run. Buffalo answered with Losman's 1-yard TD run, yet Arizona closed out the half with kicker Neil Rackers getting a 47-yard field goal.

In the third quarter, the Bills tried to catch up as kicker Rian Lindell got a 48-yard field goal, but the Cardinals answered with Warner completing a 2-yard TD pass to Fitzgerald. In the fourth quarter, Arizona pulled away as Rackers nailed a 38-yard field goal, along with Hightower getting a 2-yard TD run,

With the loss, Buffalo went into their bye week at 4–1.

QB Trent Edwards (3/3 for 18 yards), who originally started, was knocked out the game on the Bills' third offensive play by Cardinals safety Adrian Wilson with a concussion.

=== Week 7: vs. San Diego Chargers ===
| Quarter | 1 | 2 | 3 | 4 | Total |
|---|---|---|---|---|---|
| Chargers | 7 | 0 | 7 | 0 | 14 |
| Bills | 3 | 10 | 7 | 3 | 23 |

at Ralph Wilson Stadium, Orchard Park, New York

- Game time: 1:00 PM EST
- Game weather: 51 °F (11 °C) (Sunny)
- Game attendance: 71,602
- Referee: Jeff Triplette
- TV announcers (CBS): Greg Gumbel and Dan Dierdorf

Coming off their bye week, the Bills played a Week 7 duel with the San Diego Chargers. In the first quarter, Buffalo drew first blood as kicker Rian Lindell got a 38-yard field goal. The Chargers responded with QB Philip Rivers completing a 14-yard TD pass to WR Malcom Floyd. In the second quarter, the Bills regained the lead with QB Trent Edwards (fully recovered from his concussion) completing a 2-yard TD pass to WR Lee Evans, along with Lindell getting a 27-yard field goal.

In the third quarter, San Diego regained the lead with Rivers completing a 12-yard TD pass to WR Vincent Jackson. Buffalo answered with RB Marshawn Lynch getting a 9-yard TD run. In the fourth quarter, the Bills pulled away with Lindell nailing a 44-yard field goal.

With the win, not only did Buffalo improve to 5–1, they also got their first 3–0 home start since 1995.

A power outage at Ralph Wilson Stadium, caused by three helium balloons coming in contact with a transformer, led to portions of the game not being televised. For a short time during the first and second quarters, the game was played with no public address announcers, no scoreboard, and the time being kept by the officials on the field.

=== Week 8: at Miami Dolphins ===
| Quarter | 1 | 2 | 3 | 4 | Total |
|---|---|---|---|---|---|
| Bills | 3 | 6 | 7 | 0 | 16 |
| Dolphins | 7 | 0 | 10 | 8 | 25 |

at Dolphin Stadium, Miami Gardens, Florida

- Game time: 1:00 PM EDT
- Game weather: 78 °F (26 °C) (Cloudy)
- Game attendance: 65,011
- Referee: Walt Anderson
- TV announcers (CBS): Kevin Harlan and Rich Gannon

Coming off their win over the Chargers, the Bills flew to Dolphin Stadium for a Week 8 AFC East duel with the Miami Dolphins. In the first quarter, Buffalo trailed early as Dolphins QB Chad Pennington completed a 2-yard TD pass to TE Anthony Fasano. The Bills responded with kicker Rian Lindell getting a 19-yard field goal. In the second quarter, Buffalo took the lead as Lindell got a 43-yard and a 47-yard field goal.

In the third quarter, the Bills increased their lead as RB Marshawn Lynch got an 8-yard TD run. However, Miami began to respond as kicker Dan Carpenter got a 43-yard field goal, while RB Ricky Williams got a 3-yard TD run. In the fourth quarter, the Dolphins sealed Buffalo's fate as Carpenter made a 45-yard field goal, LB Joey Porter causing QB Trent Edwards to fumble the ball in his own endzone (leading to a safety), and Carpenter nailing a 35-yard field goal.

With the loss, the Bills fell to 5–2.

=== Week 9: vs. New York Jets ===
| Quarter | 1 | 2 | 3 | 4 | Total |
|---|---|---|---|---|---|
| Jets | 13 | 0 | 10 | 3 | 26 |
| Bills | 7 | 0 | 3 | 7 | 17 |

at Ralph Wilson Stadium, Orchard Park, New York

- Game time: 1:00 PM EST
- Game weather: 49 °F (9 °C) (Sunny)
- Game attendance: 71,827
- Referee: Ron Winter
- TV announcers (CBS): Jim Nantz and Phil Simms

The Bills went home for a Week 9 AFC East duel with the New York Jets. In the first quarter, Buffalo trailed early as Jets kicker Jay Feely got a 37-yard field goal. Buffalo responded as QB Trent Edwards completed a 9-yard TD pass to rookie TE Derek Fine. However, New York responded as Feely got a 26-yard field goal, along with safety Abram Elam returning an interception 92 yards for a touchdown. After a scoreless second quarter, the Bills' deficit increased in the third quarter as Feely got a 20-yard field goal. Buffalo responded with kicker Rian Lindell getting a 53-yard field goal, but the Jets replied with RB Thomas Jones getting a 7-yard TD run. In the fourth quarter, the Bills tried to rally as CB Jabari Greer returned an interception 31 yards for a touchdown. However, New York pulled away with Feely making a 31-yard field goal.

With the loss, Buffalo fell to 5–3.

=== Week 10: at New England Patriots ===
| Quarter | 1 | 2 | 3 | 4 | Total |
|---|---|---|---|---|---|
| Bills | 0 | 3 | 0 | 7 | 10 |
| Patriots | 7 | 3 | 3 | 7 | 20 |

at Gillette Stadium, Foxborough, Massachusetts

- Game time: 1:00 PM EST
- Game weather: 54 °F (12 °C) (Sunny)
- Game attendance: 68,756
- Referee: Walt Coleman
- TV announcers (CBS): Dick Enberg and Randy Cross

Trying to snap their two-game losing streak, the Bills wrapped up their three-straight divisional games in Gillette Stadium with a Week 10 AFC East duel with the New England Patriots. In the first quarter, Buffalo trailed early as Patriots QB Matt Cassel got a 13-yard TD run. In the second quarter, New England increased their lead as kicker Stephen Gostkowski got a 32-yard field goal. The Bills closed out the half with kicker Rian Lindell getting a 25-yard field goal.

In the third quarter, the Patriots answered with Gostkowski nailing a 37-yard field goal. In the fourth quarter, New England pulled away with RB BenJarvus Green-Ellis getting a 1-yard TD run. Buffalo ended the game with QB Trent Edwards completing a 14-yard TD pass to rookie WR James Hardy.

With their third-straight loss, the Bills fell to 5–4.

=== Week 11: vs. Cleveland Browns ===
| Quarter | 1 | 2 | 3 | 4 | Total |
|---|---|---|---|---|---|
| Browns | 6 | 7 | 3 | 13 | 29 |
| Bills | 0 | 10 | 3 | 14 | 27 |

at Ralph Wilson Stadium, Orchard Park, New York

- Game time: 8:30 PM EST
- Game weather: 30 °F (−1 °C) (Partly Cloudy)
- Game attendance: 71,645
- Referee: Jerome Boger
- TV announcers (ESPN): Mike Tirico, Ron Jaworski, Tony Kornheiser, Michele Tafoya, and Suzy Kolber

Trying to snap a three-game losing streak, the Bills went home for a Week 11 MNF duel with the Cleveland Browns. In the first quarter, Buffalo struggled early as early interceptions from QB Trent Edwards helped Browns kicker Phil Dawson get a 40-yard and a 33-yard field goal. In the second quarter, Cleveland increased their lead as WR/KR Joshua Cribbs got a 2-yard TD run. The Bills answered as Edwards completed an 18-yard TD pass to RB Marshawn Lynch, along with kicker Rian Lindell getting a 26-yard field goal.

In the third quarter, the Browns answered with Dawson getting a 43-yard field. Buffalo replied with Lindell getting a 31-yard field goal. In the fourth quarter, Cleveland greatly answered as RB Jerome Harrison got a 72-yard TD run. The Bills immediately replied as rookie CB Leodis McKelvin returned a kickoff 98 yards for a touchdown. The Browns responded as Dawson got a 22-yard field goal. Buffalo took the lead as Edwards got a 1-yard TD run. Cleveland regained the lead as Dawson nailed a 56-yard field goal. The Bills' Lindell missed a 47-yard field goal wide right.

With their fourth-straight loss, Buffalo fell to 5–5.

=== Week 12: at Kansas City Chiefs ===
| Quarter | 1 | 2 | 3 | 4 | Total |
|---|---|---|---|---|---|
| Bills | 7 | 23 | 17 | 7 | 54 |
| Chiefs | 7 | 10 | 7 | 7 | 31 |

at Arrowhead Stadium, Kansas City, Missouri

- Game time: 1:00 PM EST
- Game weather: 50 °F (10 °C) (mostly cloudy)
- Game attendance: 73,584
- Referee: Bill Leavy
- TV announcers (CBS): Ian Eagle and Solomon Wilcots

Hoping to snap a four-game losing streak, the Bills flew to Arrowhead Stadium for a Week 12 duel with the Kansas City Chiefs. In the first quarter, Buffalo trailed early as Chiefs QB Tyler Thigpen completed a 36-yard TD pass to RB Jamaal Charles. The Bills responded with RB Marshawn Lynch getting a 1-yard TD run. In the second quarter, Buffalo took the lead as kicker Rian Lindell made a 21-yard field goal. Kansas City answered with Thigpen completing a 2-yard TD pass to TE Tony Gonzalez. Buffalo regained the lead as Lindell got a 39-yard field goal, while rookie CB Leodis McKelvin returned an interception 64 yards for a touchdown. The Chiefs struck back with kicker Connor Barth getting a 45-yard field goal, yet the Bills continued their offensive explosion as Lindell got a 34-yard field goal, along with QB Trent Edwards getting a 15-yard TD run.

In the third quarter, Buffalo continued its poundings with Edwards getting a 5-yard TD run, while Lindell got himself a 38-yard field goal. Kansas City tried to rally as Thigpen completed a 45-yard TD pass to WR Mark Bradley, yet the Bills replied with Edwards completing an 8-yard TD pass to WR Josh Reed. In the fourth quarter, Buffalo pulled away as Edwards completed a 17-yard TD pass to TE Derek Schouman. The Chiefs tried to come back as QB Quinn Gray completed a 3-yard TD pass to WR Dwayne Bowe, yet the Bills' lead was too much for Kansas City to overcome.

With the win, Buffalo improved to 6–5.

This marked the first time the Bills scored 50+ points on an opponent since Sept. 1991 against the Pittsburgh Steelers (52–34).

=== Week 13: vs. San Francisco 49ers ===
| Quarter | 1 | 2 | 3 | 4 | Total |
|---|---|---|---|---|---|
| 49ers | 7 | 3 | 0 | 0 | 10 |
| Bills | 0 | 0 | 3 | 0 | 3 |

at Ralph Wilson Stadium, Orchard Park, New York

- Game time: 1:00 PM EDT
- Game weather: 38 °F (3 °C) (Mostly Cloudy, Light Rain)
- Game attendance: 70,988
- Referee: Bill Carollo
- TV announcers (Fox): Ron Pitts, Tony Boselli, and Charissa Thompson

Coming off a road win over the Chiefs, the Bills went home for a Week 13 interconference duel against the San Francisco 49ers. In the first quarter, Buffalo trailed early as 49ers QB Shaun Hill completed a 12-yard TD pass to WR Isaac Bruce. In the second quarter, the Bills continued to trail as kicker Joe Nedney made a 50-yard field goal. In the third quarter, Buffalo tried to rally as kicker Rian Lindell nailed a 22-yard field goal, but the team struggled offensively for the rest of the game.

With the loss, the Bills fell to 6–6.

QB Trent Edwards (10/21 for 112 yards) didn't play the second half, due to a groin injury.

=== Week 14: vs. Miami Dolphins ===
| Quarter | 1 | 2 | 3 | 4 | Total |
|---|---|---|---|---|---|
| Dolphins | 7 | 6 | 0 | 3 | 16 |
| Bills | 3 | 0 | 0 | 0 | 3 |

at Rogers Centre, Toronto, Ontario

- Game time: 4:05 PM EST
- Game weather: None (Dome Closed)
- Game attendance: 52,134
- Referee: John Parry
- TV announcers (CBS): Kevin Harlan & Rich Gannon

Hoping to rebound from their home loss to the 49ers, the Bills flew to the Rogers Centre for their first game of their Canadian International series, with an AFC East rematch against the Miami Dolphins. In the first quarter, Buffalo trailed early as Dolphins QB Chad Pennington completed a 20-yard TD pass to TE Anthony Fasano. The Bills answered with kicker Rian Lindell. After that, Miami pulled away as kicker Dan Carpenter made three field goals (50, 35, and 27 yards).

With the loss, Buffalo fell to 6–7.

=== Week 15: at New York Jets ===
| Quarter | 1 | 2 | 3 | 4 | Total |
|---|---|---|---|---|---|
| Bills | 3 | 14 | 3 | 7 | 27 |
| Jets | 14 | 7 | 0 | 10 | 31 |

at The Meadowlands, East Rutherford, New Jersey

- Game time: 1:00 PM EST
- Game weather: 40 °F (4 °C) (sunny)
- Game attendance: 78,548
- Referee: Jeff Triplette
- TV announcers (CBS): Greg Gumbel and Dan Dierdorf

Hoping to snap a two-game losing streak, the Bills flew to The Meadowlands for a Week 15 AFC East rematch with the New York Jets. With Trent Edwards still recovering from a groin injury, J.P. Losman was given the start.

Early on in the first quarter, Buffalo trailed as Jets running back Thomas Jones got a 2-yard touchdown run. The Bills responded with a 34-yard field goal from kicker Rian Lindell, but New York answered with quarterback Brett Favre completing an 11-yard touchdown pass to wide receiver Jerricho Cotchery. In the second quarter, Buffalo took the lead as Losman got an 8-yard touchdown run and completed a 2-yard touchdown pass to rookie wide receiver Stevie Johnson. However, the Jets got the halftime lead with a 47-yard touchdown run from running back Leon Washington.

In the third quarter, the Bills kept pace as Lindell made a 48-yard field goal. In the fourth quarter, New York responded with kicker Jay Feely's 31-yard field goal. Buffalo regained the lead as running back Fred Jackson powered his way for an 11-yard touchdown run. However, the Jets prevailed as safety Abram Elam forced a fumble, allowing DE Shaun Ellis to return the ball 11 yards for a touchdown.

With the loss, not only did the Bills fall to 6–8, but they were eliminated from the playoff race.

=== Week 16: at Denver Broncos ===
| Quarter | 1 | 2 | 3 | 4 | Total |
|---|---|---|---|---|---|
| Bills | 0 | 10 | 6 | 14 | 30 |
| Broncos | 10 | 3 | 7 | 3 | 23 |

at Invesco Field at Mile High, Denver, Colorado

- Game time: 4:05 PM EST
- Game weather: 17 °F (−8 °C) (sunny)
- Game attendance: 74,539
- Referee: Terry McAulay
- TV announcers (CBS): Ian Eagle and Solomon Wilcots

Hoping to snap a three-game losing streak, the Bills flew to Invesco Field at Mile High for a Week 16 duel with the Denver Broncos. Buffalo trailed early in the first quarter as Broncos quarterback Jay Cutler got a 2-yard touchdown run, followed by kicker Matt Prater getting a 23-yard field goal. Denver increased its lead in the second quarter with Prater's 30-yard field goal. The Bills responded with a 37-yard field goal from kicker Rian Lindell, followed by running back Marshawn Lynch's 2-yard touchdown run.

In the third quarter, Buffalo took the lead with Lindell's 49-yard and 28-yard field goal, but the Broncos answered with Cutler's 6-yard touchdown run. The Bills struck right back in the fourth quarter as quarterback Trent Edwards completed a 3-yard touchdown pass to rookie wide receiver Stevie Johnson. Denver tied the game with Prater nailing a 43-yard field goal. Buffalo rallied with running back Fred Jackson getting an 8-yard touchdown run, followed the defense surviving the Broncos' late-game drive.

With the win, the Bills improved to 7–8.

=== Week 17: vs. New England Patriots ===
| Quarter | 1 | 2 | 3 | 4 | Total |
|---|---|---|---|---|---|
| Patriots | 3 | 0 | 7 | 3 | 13 |
| Bills | 0 | 0 | 0 | 0 | 0 |

at Ralph Wilson Stadium, Orchard Park, New York

- Game time: 1:00 PM EDT
- Game weather: 39 °F (4 °C) (mostly cloudy and very windy)
- Game attendance: 71,282
- Referee: Gene Steratore
- TV announcers (CBS): Greg Gumbel and Dan Dierdorf

Coming off their road win over the Broncos, the Bills closed out their season at home with a Week 17 AFC East rematch with the New England Patriots. Buffalo trailed early in the first quarter as Patriots kicker Stephen Gostkowski got a 33-yard field goal. After a scoreless second quarter, the Bills' deficit increased in the third quarter as running back LaMont Jordan got a 2-yard touchdown run. In the fourth quarter, New England added to their lead as Gostkowski nailed a 23-yard field goal.

With the loss, the Bills closed out their season at 7–9 for the third-straight season.
