= 2007 Buffalo Bills season =

48th season in franchise history

- Owner: Ralph Wilson
- General manager: Marv Levy
- Head coach: Dick Jauron
- Home stadium: Ralph Wilson Stadium

Results
- Record: 7–9
- Division place: 2nd AFC East
- Playoffs: Did not qualify
- Pro Bowlers: OT Jason Peters; DE Aaron Schobel

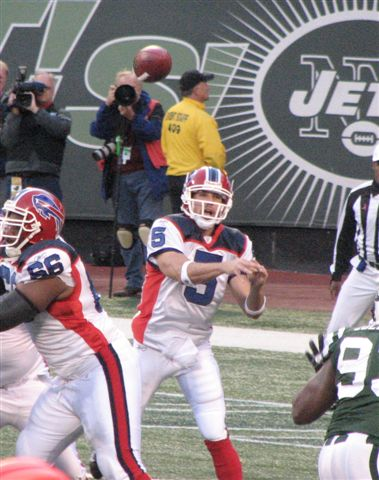
Buffalo quarterback Trent Edwards passes in the Week 8 clash at the New York Jets, October 28, 2007

The 2007 Buffalo Bills season was the 38th season for the team in the National Football League (NFL) and their 48th season overall.

The Bills finished their 2007 season with a record of 7–9 and tied their 7–9 record in 2006, but failed to qualify for the playoffs, and continued a playoff appearance drought started with the 1999–2000 season. The 8-year playoff drought became the longest such stretch in team history.

The opening game of the season was notable in that tight end Kevin Everett was injured on a kickoff. Everett sustained a fracture and dislocation of his cervical spine that his doctors characterized as "life-threatening" the day after the injury, stating it was likely to leave him with permanent neurological impairment. However, on September 11, 2007, Everett showed significant movement in his arms and legs, which led doctors to speculate that he might eventually be able to walk again. Everett walked in public for the first time at Ralph Wilson Stadium before the home finale against the New York Giants on December 23, 2007.

== Coaching staff ==
Head coach Dick Jauron entered his second year with the Bills, where was joined by Offensive Coordinator Steve Fairchild and Defensive Coordinator Perry Fewell.

== Offseason ==
=== NFL draft ===
The Bills experienced varying degrees of success with their first three draft picks in the 2007 Draft. Running back Marshawn Lynch made the AFC's Pro Bowl squad in 2008; his career in Buffalo, however, was often marred by off-field issues. Paul Posluzny was a solid defender for the Bills for four seasons. Quarterback Trent Edwards became the Bills' starting quarterback in Week 3 of 2007, when starter J. P. Losman was injured by the New England Patriots' Vince Wilfork. Edwards was the Buffalo's starting quarterback, until he was waived early in the 2010 season in favor of Bills backup quarterback Ryan Fitzpatrick.

2007 Buffalo Bills draft
Round	Pick	Player	Position	College	Notes
1	12	Marshawn Lynch *	RB	California	
2	34	Paul Posluszny *	LB	Penn State	
3	92	Trent Edwards	QB	Stanford	
4	111	Dwayne Wright	RB	Fresno State	
6	184	John Wendling	S	Wyoming	
7	222	Derek Schouman	TE	Boise State	
7	239	C.J. Ah You	DE	Oklahoma	
Made roster † Pro Football Hall of Fame * Made at least one Pro Bowl during career

== Personnel ==
=== Staff/coaches ===
2007 Buffalo Bills staff
Front office: Owner/CEO/president - Ralph Wilson; Head coaches: Head coach - Dick Jauron; Assistant head coach - Bobby April; Assistant to the head coach/special projects - Chuck Lester; Offensive coaches: Offensive coordinator - Steve Fairchild; Quarterbacks - Turk Schonert; Running game coordinator/running backs - Eric Studesville; Wide receivers - Tyke Tolbert; Tight ends - Charlie Coiner; Offensive line - Jim McNally; Assistant offensive line - Sean Kugler; Offensive quality control - Alex Van Pelt	Defensive coaches: Defensive coordinator - Perry Fewell; Defensive line - Bill Kollar; Linebackers - Matt Sheldon; Defensive backs - George Catavolos; Defensive/special teams assistant - DeMontie Cross; Defensive quality control - Adrian White; Special teams coaches: Special teams coordinator - Bobby April; Strength and conditioning: Head strength and conditioning - John Allaire

=== Final roster ===
2007 Buffalo Bills roster
Quarterbacks (QB): 5 Trent Edwards; 10 Gibran Hamdan; 7 J. P. Losman; Running backs (RB): 22 Fred Jackson; 23 Marshawn Lynch; 36 Shaud Williams; 31 Dwayne Wright; Wide receivers (WR): 89 Sam Aiken; 83 Lee Evans; 17 Justin Jenkins; 19 Scott Mayle; 11 Roscoe Parrish KR/PR; 82 Josh Reed; Tight ends (TE): 86 Michael Gaines; 49 Tim Massaquoi; 88 Ryan Neufeld; 84 Robert Royal	Offensive linemen (OL): 60 Brad Butler G; 73 Kirk Chambers T; 66 Derrick Dockery G; 78 Patrick Estes T; 67 Melvin Fowler C; 63 Christian Gaddis C; 71 Jason Peters T; 75 Duke Preston G; 68 Langston Walker T; Defensive linemen (DL): 93 Anthony Hargrove DE; 99 Jason Jefferson DT; 90 Chris Kelsay DE; 74 Corey Mace DT; 97 John McCargo DT; 94 Aaron Schobel DE; 98 Larry Tripplett DT; 95 Kyle Williams DT	Linebackers (LB): 54 Blake Costanzo MLB; 55 Angelo Crowell OLB; 52 John DiGiorgio MLB/OLB; 56 Keith Ellison OLB; 53 Mario Haggan OLB; 59 Leon Joe OLB; 57 Josh Stamer MLB; Defensive backs (DB): 38 Jerametrius Butler CB; 35 Dustin Fox CB; 33 Jabari Greer CB; 42 Jim Leonhard FS; 24 Terrence McGee CB; 43 Bryan Scott FS/SS; 29 John Wendling SS; 20 Donte Whitner SS; 26 Ashton Youboty CB; Special teams (ST): 9 Rian Lindell K; 8 Brian Moorman P; 72 Ryan Neill LS	Practice squad: -- Jon Corto LB; 45 Jonathan Evans FB; 15 Felton Huggins WR; -- Khari Long DE; -- Nevin McCaskill G; -- Shaun Nua DE; 41 E. J. Underwood S; Reserve: 96 Copeland Bryan DE (IR); 92 Ryan Denney DE (IR); 85 Kevin Everett TE (IR); 50 Kevin Harrison LB (IR); 62 Aaron Merz G (IR); 87 Matt Murphy TE (IR); 51 Paul Posluszny LB (IR); 81 Peerless Price WR (IR); 80 Derek Schouman TE (IR); 30 Ko Simpson S (IR); 28 Anthony Thomas RB (IR); 25 Kiwaukee Thomas CB (IR); -- Al Wallace DE (IR); 21 Jason Webster CB (IR); 65 Jason Whittle C/G (IR); 37 George Wilson S (IR); 27 Coy Wire LB (IR); Rookies in italics 53 active, 17 reserve, 7 practice squad

== Schedule ==
=== Preseason ===
Week	Date	Opponent	Result	Record	Venue	Recap
1	August 10	New Orleans Saints	**W** 13–10	1–0	Louisiana Superdome	Recap
2	August 17	Atlanta Falcons	**L** 10–13	1–1	Ralph Wilson Stadium	Recap
3	August 24	Tennessee Titans	**L** 17–28	1–2	Ralph Wilson Stadium	Recap
4	August 30	Detroit Lions	**W** 16–13	2–2	Ford Field	Recap

=== Regular season ===
Week	Date	Opponent	Result	Record	Venue	Recap
1	September 9	Denver Broncos	**L** 14–15	0–1	Ralph Wilson Stadium	Recap
2	September 16	at Pittsburgh Steelers	**L** 3–26	0–2	Heinz Field	Recap
3	September 23	at **New England Patriots**	**L** 7–38	0–3	Gillette Stadium	Recap
4	September 30	**New York Jets**	**W** 17–14	1–3	Ralph Wilson Stadium	Recap
5	October 8	Dallas Cowboys	**L** 24–25	1–4	Ralph Wilson Stadium	Recap
6	Bye					
7	October 21	Baltimore Ravens	**W** 19–14	2–4	Ralph Wilson Stadium	Recap
8	October 28	at **New York Jets**	**W** 13–3	3–4	Giants Stadium	Recap
9	November 4	Cincinnati Bengals	**W** 33–21	4–4	Ralph Wilson Stadium	Recap
10	November 11	at **Miami Dolphins**	**W** 13–10	5–4	Dolphin Stadium	Recap
11	November 18	**New England Patriots**	**L** 10–56	5–5	Ralph Wilson Stadium	Recap
12	November 25	at Jacksonville Jaguars	**L** 14–36	5–6	Jacksonville Municipal Stadium	Recap
13	December 2	at Washington Redskins	**W** 17–16	6–6	FedExField	Recap
14	December 9	**Miami Dolphins**	**W** 38–17	7–6	Ralph Wilson Stadium	Recap
15	December 16	at Cleveland Browns	**L** 0–8	7–7	Cleveland Browns Stadium	Recap
16	December 23	New York Giants	**L** 21–38	7–8	Ralph Wilson Stadium	Recap
17	December 30	at Philadelphia Eagles	**L** 9–17	7–9	Lincoln Financial Field	Recap

Note: Intra-division opponents are in bold text.

== Game summaries ==
=== Week 1: vs. Denver Broncos ===
Quarter	1	2	3	4	Total
Broncos	3	3	6	3	15
Bills	7	0	7	0	14

at Ralph Wilson Stadium, Orchard Park, New York

- Game time: 1:00 PM EDT/12:00 PM CDT
- Game weather: 70 °F (21 °C) (Windy & Rainy)
- Game attendance: 71,132
- Referee: Gerry Austin
- TV announcers (CBS): Gus Johnson & Randy Cross

The Bills began their 2007 campaign at home against the Denver Broncos. In the first quarter, the Bills struck first with WR/PR Roscoe Parrish returning a punt 74 yards for a touchdown. Then, near the end of the period, the Broncos got on the board with kicker Jason Elam getting a 21-yard field goal. Denver went on to get the only score of the second quarter, as Elam kicked a 48-yard field goal.

On the opening kickoff for the second half, Bills TE Kevin Everett suffered a cervical spine injury. He was rushed to Millard Fillmore Gates Hospital for an emergency surgery.

In the third quarter, rookie Bills RB Marshawn Lynch got a 23-yard TD run. Afterwards, the Broncos pulled within two as QB Jay Cutler completed a 5-yard TD pass to WR Brandon Marshall (followed by a failed 2-Point Conversion). Near the end of the fourth quarter, Cutler drove his team into field goal range and with no timeouts left, Denver's special teams came on and Elam kicked the game-winning 42-yard field goal with no time left on the clock.

With the shocking loss, the Bills began the season at 0–1.

=== Week 2: at Pittsburgh Steelers ===
Quarter	1	2	3	4	Total
Bills	0	0	3	0	3
Steelers	3	9	7	7	26

at Heinz Field, Pittsburgh, Pennsylvania

- Game time: 1:00 PM EDT
- Game attendance: 64,307
- Referee: Larry Nemmers
- TV announcers (CBS): Ian Eagle (play-by-play) and Solomon Wilcots (color commentator)

Hoping to rebound from a last-second home loss to the Broncos, the Bills (with TE Kevin Everett on the mind) went to Heinz Field for their Week 2 match-up against the throwback-clad Pittsburgh Steelers. In the first half, the Bills struggled on offense while their defense only allowed three Jeff Reed field goal (a 34-yard field goal in the first quarter, along with a 28-yard and a 39-yard field goal). In the third quarter, Buffalo got their only score of the game as kicker Rian Lindell nailed a 24-yard field goal. For the rest of the game, the Steelers dominated, with QB Ben Roethlisberger completing a 1-yard TD pass to TE Matt Spaeth later in the period, along with RB Willie Parker getting an 11-yard TD run in the fourth quarter.

With the loss, the Bills fell to 0–2.

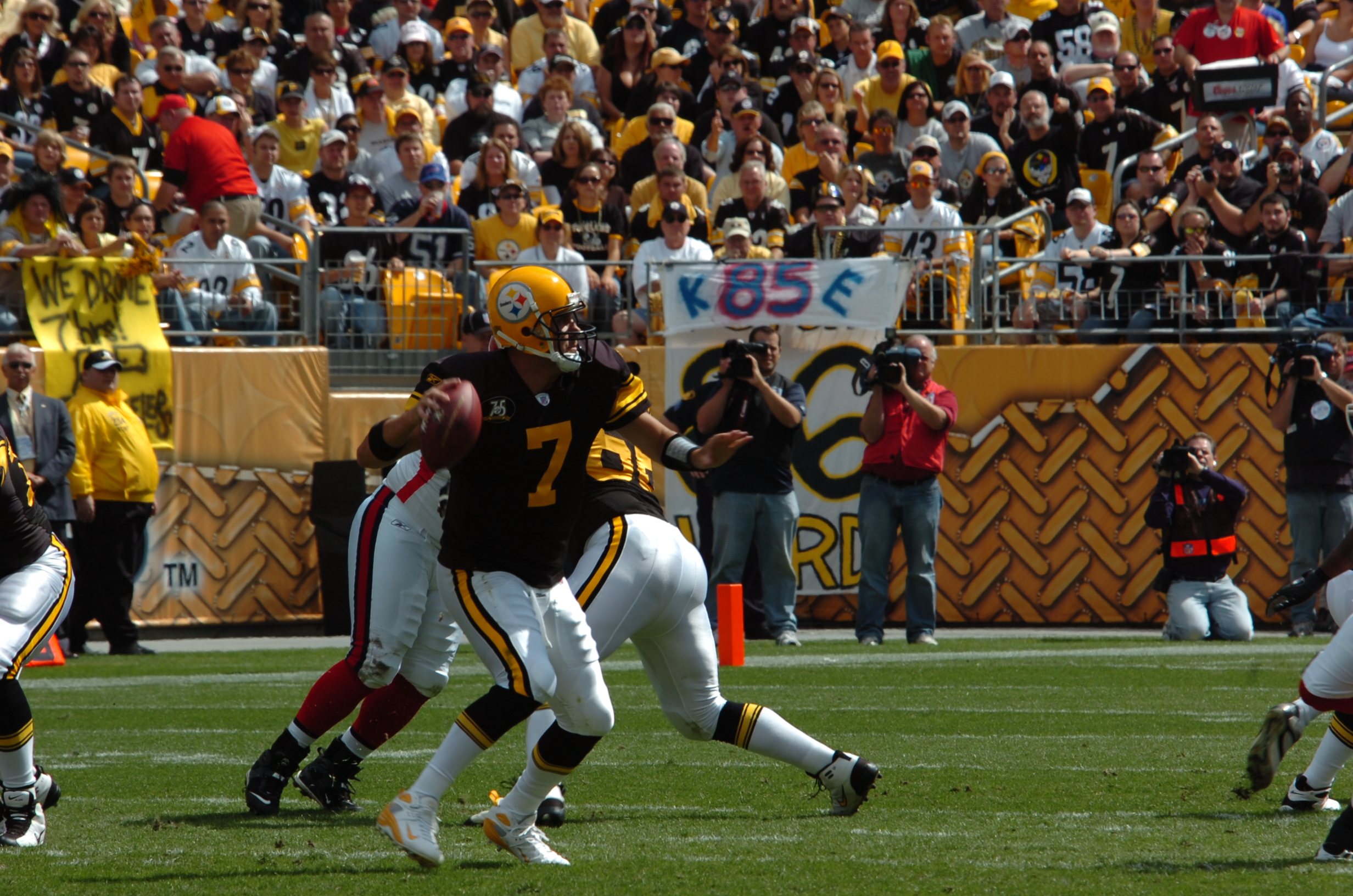
Buffalo on defense (1 of 3)

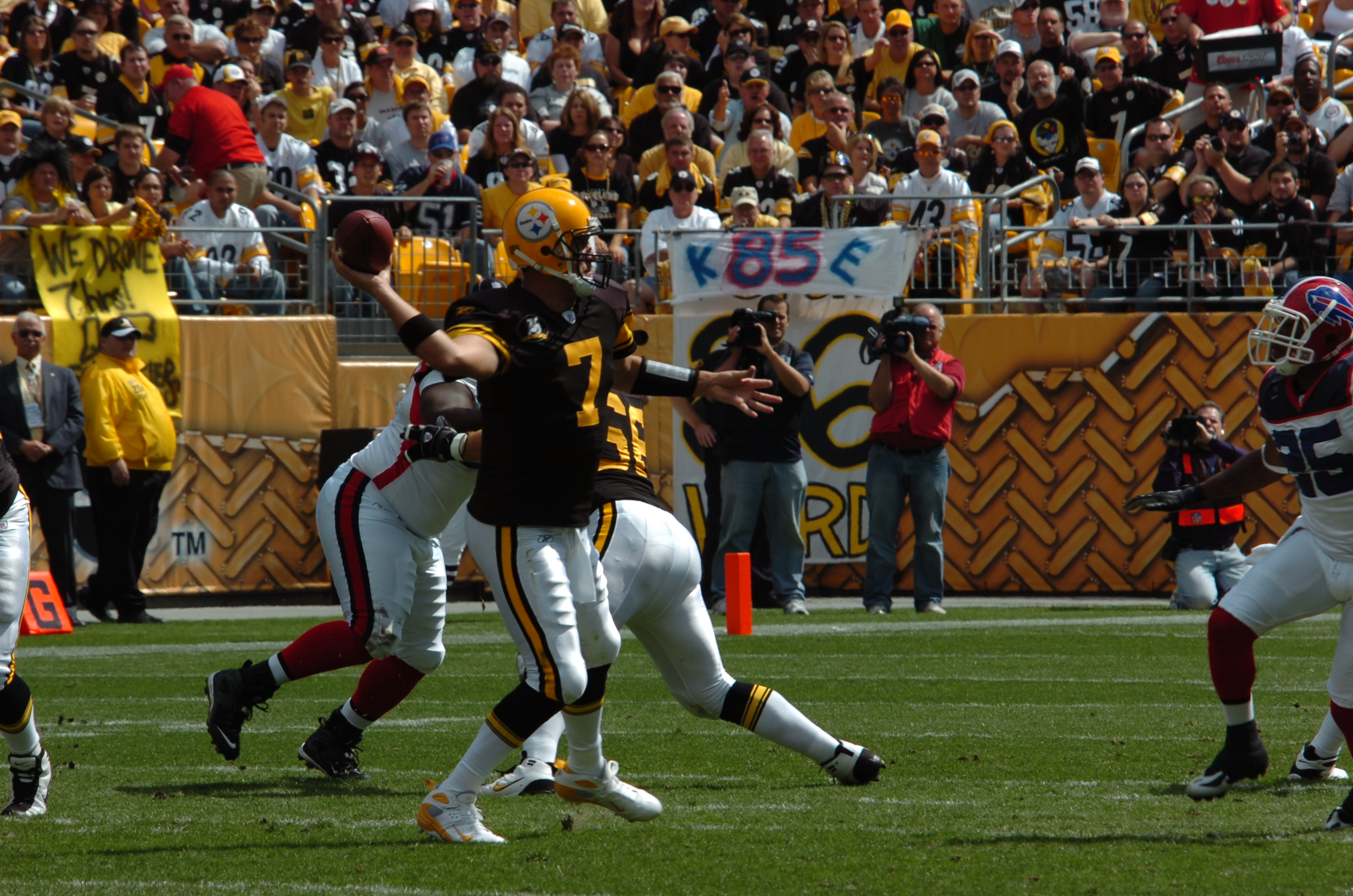
Buffalo on defense (2 of 3)

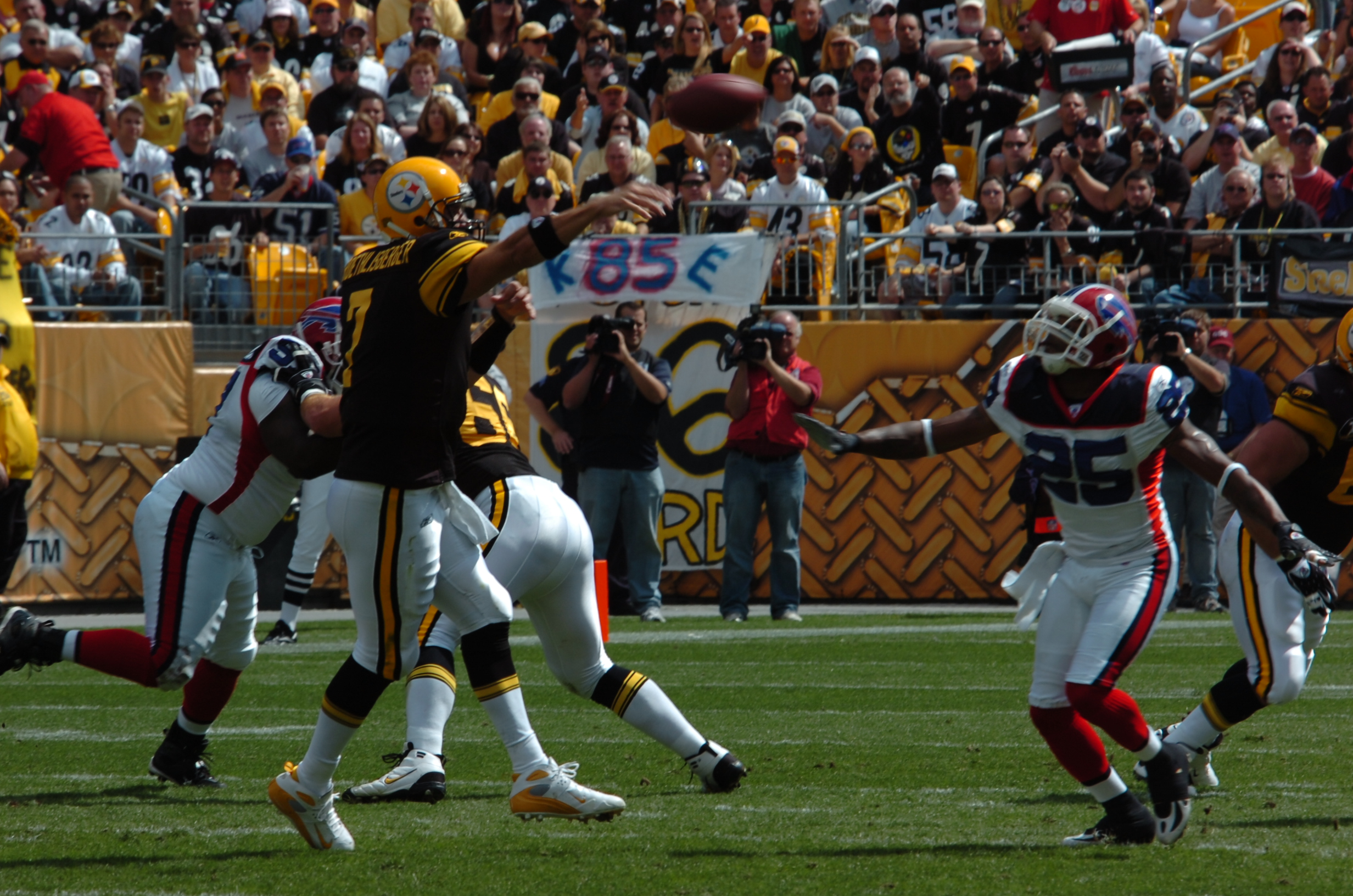
Buffalo on defense (3 of 3)

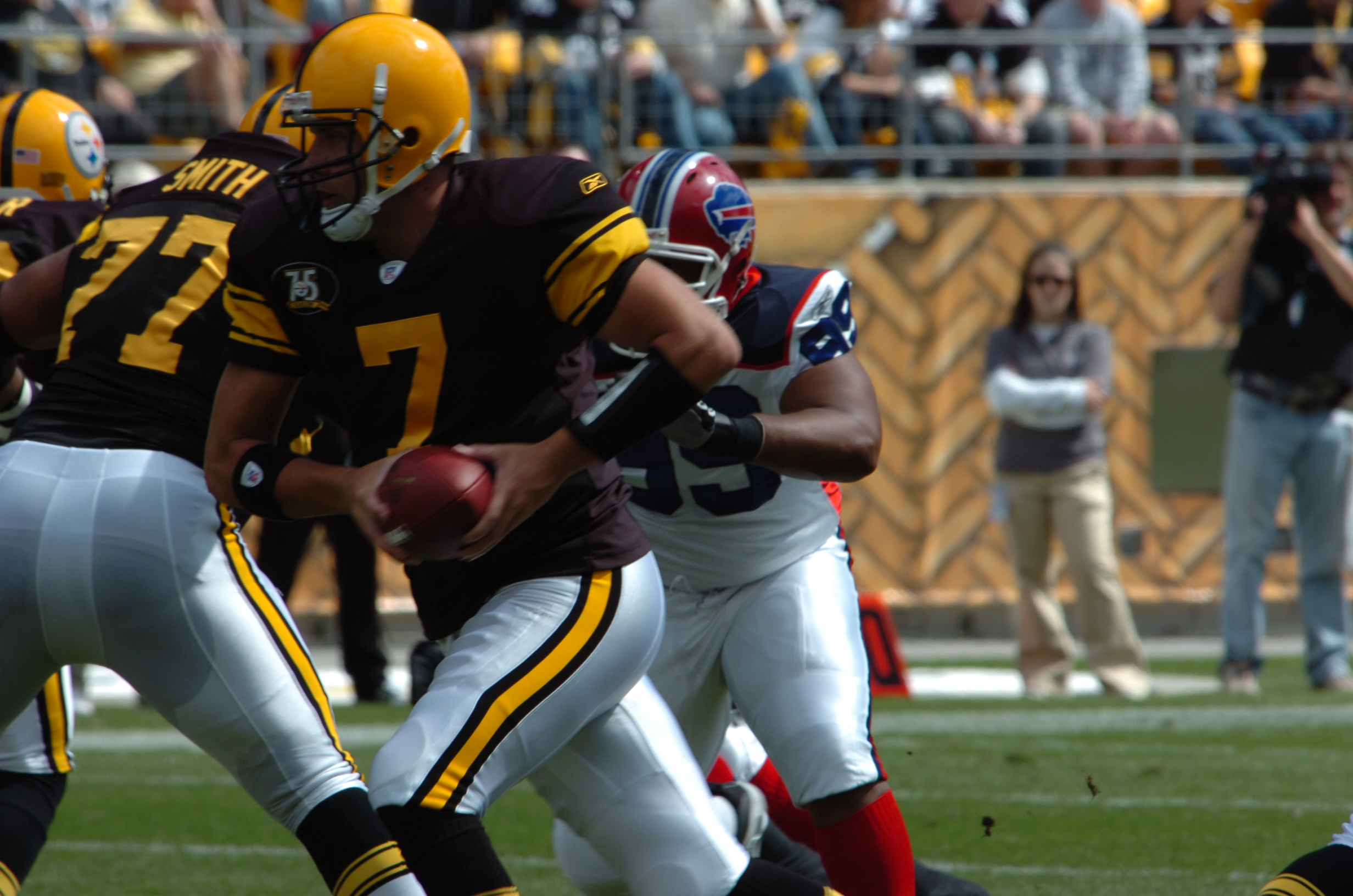
Pittsburgh QB Ben Roethlisberger

=== Week 3: at New England Patriots ===
Quarter	1	2	3	4	Total
Bills	7	0	0	0	7
Patriots	3	14	14	7	38

at Gillette Stadium, Foxboro, Massachusetts

- Game time: 1:00 p.m. EST
- Game weather: 74 °F (23 °C) (Clear)
- Game attendance: 68,756
- Referee: Scott Green
- TV announcers (CBS): Kevin Harlan (play-by-play) and Rich Gannon (color commentator)

Trying to snap a two-game skid, the Bills flew to Gillette Stadium for a Week 3 divisional fight with the New England Patriots. In the first quarter, QB J. P. Losman was immediately injured on the first offensive play of the game. He finished the series, but ended up on the bench for the rest of the game. After New England took the lead with kicker Stephen Gostkowski's 24-yard field goal, rookie QB Trent Edwards played the rest of the game for Buffalo. The Bills got their only score of the game as RB Marshawn Lynch got an 8-yard TD run, and a Rian Lindell extra point put the Bills ahead surprisingly 7–3. However, in the second quarter, the Patriots were able to open up their running game when Bills rookie standout Paul Posluszny was lost due to a broken arm. This left passing lanes open, and for the rest of the game, the Patriots dominated. QB Tom Brady's 8-yard TD pass to TE Benjamin Watson and a 3-yard TD pass to WR Randy Moss made it 17–7 at the half. In the third quarter, New England continued its conquest with Brady's 4-yard TD pass to WR Jabar Gaffney and RB Sammy Morris' 4-yard TD run. In the fourth quarter, the Patriots ended the day with Brady and Moss hooking up with each other again on a 45-yard TD pass.

With their third-straight loss, the Bills fell to 0–3.

=== Week 4 vs. Jets ===
Week Four: New York Jets (1–2) at Buffalo Bills (0–3)

Quarter	1	2	3	4	Total
Jets	0	0	7	7	14
Bills	0	0	7	10	17

at Ralph Wilson Stadium • Orchard Park, New York

- Date: September 30
- Game time: 1:00 p.m. EDT
- Game weather: Sunny • 70 °F (21 °C) • Wind S/SE 10 miles per hour (16 km/h; 8.7 kn)
- Game attendance: 70,600
- Referee: John Parry
- TV announcers (CBS): Ian Eagle and Solomon Wilcots
- Gamebook

Game information

Jets

- Chad Pennington
  32/39, 291 Yds, TD, 2 INT
- Thomas Jones
  12 Rush, 35 Yds
- Jerricho Cotchery
  8 Rec, 107 Yds

Bills

- Trent Edwards
  22/28, 234 Yds, TD, INT
- Marshawn Lynch
  23 Rush, 79 Yds, TD
- Lee Evans
  6 Rec, 72 Yds

There were many factors that made the Bills underdogs before Week 4- an 0–3 start coming off of a demoralizing loss to the New England Patriots, a starting quarterback in Trent Edwards who was starting his very first NFL game, numerous defensive injuries of starters, and an opponent in the New York Jets that had just gotten its first win over the Miami Dolphins. Things started off well for the Bills as Edwards led the offense down into Jets territory, but a Robert Royal fumble caused by Jonathan Vilma ended a promising drive. The Jets could not get any sort of momentum from the turnover, and were forced to punt.

In the second quarter, things heated up as the Bills once again managed to gain several first downs, only to see the Jets force another turnover as a deep ball by Edwards meant for Lee Evans was intercepted by Andre Dyson. Three events late in the first half led to a flurry of big plays- Bills safety Donte Whitner tackled Jets RB Leon Washington inbounds to keep the clock running, quarterback Chad Pennington faked a spike and completed a pass to put the Jets in field goal range with a couple of seconds left, and Jets kicker Mike Nugent clanged the ball off the right upright, leaving the game scoreless at the half.

The second half saw the Bills take the lead on a 10-yard run by Marshawn Lynch, his second of the year. It was all set up by Edwards going 4 for 4 on the drive. The Jets tied it at 7 on an inspired drive by Pennington, who found Laveranues Coles in the end zone for a touchdown.

The fourth quarter saw the Bills take advantage of the Jets when reserve defensive back Jabari Greer intercepted Pennington. The Bills cashed in as Edwards found reserve tight end Michael Gaines on a bootleg 4th down play at the Jets 1-yard line, and once again the Bills got more points when kicker Rian Lindell kicked a 46-yard field goal to make it 17–7. The Jets came right back with points of their own as Leon Washington rambled in to cut the lead to 17–14. After a Buffalo punt with less than 2 minutes remaining, the Jets failed to score as a forced pass by Pennington with 6 seconds left ended up in the acrobatic arms of Terrence McGee, preserving the 17–14 victory. The Bills took over second place in the AFC East at 1–3 because of the win, while the Jets fell to 1–3.

Scoring summary

Quarter	Time	Drive			Team	Scoring information	Score	
Quarter	Time	Plays	Yards	TOP	Team	Scoring information	NYJ	BUF
3	6:44	10	56	6:20	Bills	Marshawn Lynch 10-yard touchdown run, Rian Lindell kick good	0	7
3	2:13	7	78	4:31	Jets	Laveranues Coles 5-yard touchdown reception from Chad Pennington, Mike Nugent kick good	7	7
4	10:49	12	65	6:24	Bills	46-yard field goal by Rian Lindell	7	10
4	6:56	6	25	3:05	Bills	Michael Gaines 1-yard touchdown reception from Trent Edwards, Rian Lindell kick good	7	17
4	3:02	11	64	3:54	Jets	Leon Washington 8-yard touchdown run, Mike Nugent kick good	14	17
"TOP" = time of possession. For other American football terms, see Glossary of American football.							14	17

=== Week 5: vs. Dallas Cowboys ===
Quarter	1	2	3	4	Total
Cowboys	0	10	3	12	25
Bills	7	10	7	0	24

at Ralph Wilson Stadium, Orchard Park, New York

- Game time: 8:30 PM EDT
- Game weather: 73 °F (23 °C) (Partly Cloudy)
- Game attendance: 71,575
- Referee: Walt Anderson
- TV announcers (ESPN): Mike Tirico (play-by-play) & Tony Kornheiser, Ron Jaworski (color commentators)

Coming off their divisional home win over the Jets, the Bills stayed at home, donned their throwback uniforms, and played their first home Monday Night football game in 13 years against the undefeated Dallas Cowboys. In the first quarter, Buffalo got off to a fast start with DB George Wilson returning an interception 25-yard for a touchdown, along with the only score of the period. In the second quarter, the Cowboys tied the game with QB Tony Romo completing a 22-yard TD pass to TE Jason Witten. Afterwards, Buffalo increased its lead with kicker Rian Lindell getting a 24-yard field goal, along with DE Chris Kelsay intercepting a Romo pass in the endzone for a touchdown. Dallas ended the half with kicker Nick Folk getting a 47-yard field goal.

In the third quarter, Dallas drew closer with Folk kicking a 29-yard field goal. The Bills immediately responded with CB Terrence McGee returning a kickoff 102 yards for a touchdown. The Bills led 24–13 until 3:46 left in the fourth quarter, when the Cowboys got within 8 points with Folk getting a 37-yard field goal. From there, things began to look grim for Buffalo as a Trent Edwards interception eventually turned into Romo's 4-yard TD pass to WR Patrick Crayton. The two-point conversion was no good, but Dallas got a successful onside kick. With only 3 seconds left, Folk came out for a 53-yard field goal. The first try was good, yet it was negated with Head Coach Dick Jauron calling time out (repeating a move done by both the Denver Broncos in week 2 and the Oakland Raiders in week 3). However, the technique that worked for Denver and Oakland for this year failed as Folk got the game-winning 53-yard field goal as time ran out, despite the Bills defense getting 6 turnovers from Romo (5 interceptions and 1 fumble).

With the heart-breaking loss, the Bills entered their bye week at 1–4.

=== Week 7: vs. Baltimore Ravens ===
Quarter	1	2	3	4	Total
Ravens	0	0	0	14	14
Bills	3	6	10	0	19

at Ralph Wilson Stadium, Orchard Park, New York

- Game time: 1:00 PM EDT
- Game weather: 66 °F (19 °C) (Sunny)
- Game attendance: 70,727
- Referee: Terry McAulay
- TV announcers (CBS): Kevin Harlan (play-by-play) & Rich Gannon (color commentator)

Coming off their bye week, the Bills stayed at home for a fierce Week 7 intraconference duel with the Baltimore Ravens. This match-up was notable for RB Willis McGahee heading back to Buffalo to play against his former team.

In the first quarter, the Bills got the first blood with kicker Rian Lindell getting a 29-yard field goal for the only score of the period. In the second quarter, Buffalo increased its lead with Lindell nailing a 26-yard and a 35-yard field goal. In the third quarter, the Ravens began to climb back into the game with McGahee getting a 46-yard TD run. The Bills responded with Lindell getting a 41-yard field goal, along with McGahee's successor, RB Marshawn Lynch, getting a 1-yard TD run. In the fourth quarter, Baltimore drew closer as QB Kyle Boller completed a 15-yard TD pass to WR Derrick Mason. Buffalo managed to hold on for the victory.

With the win, the Bills improved to 2–4.

=== Week 8: at New York Jets ===
Quarter	1	2	3	4	Total
Bills	3	0	0	10	13
Jets	0	3	0	0	3

at The Meadowlands, East Rutherford, New Jersey

- Game time: 4:05 PM EDT
- Game weather: 56 °F (13 °C) (Clear)
- Game attendance: 76,688
- Referee: Jerome Boger
- TV announcers (CBS): Gus Johnson (play-by-play) & Steve Tasker (color commentator)

Coming off their impressive home win over the Ravens, the Bills flew to The Meadowlands for an AFC East rematch with the New York Jets. In the first quarter, Buffalo busted out early with kicker Rian Lindell getting a 30-yard field goal for the only score of the period. In the second quarter, New York tied the game with kicker Mike Nugent getting a 27-yard field goal for the only score of the period.

During a scoreless third quarter, the Bills' starting QB (rookie Trent Edwards-14/21 for 130 yards and 1 interception) had to leave the game with a sprained right wrist, forcing a fully healed J. P. Losman into the game. In the fourth quarter, Buffalo took control with Lindell nailing a 40-yard field goal, along with Losman's 85-yard TD pass to WR Lee Evans.

With the win, not only did Buffalo improve to 3–4, but they also swept the Jets for the first time since 1997.

=== Week 9: vs. Cincinnati Bengals ===
Quarter	1	2	3	4	Total
Bengals	7	7	7	0	21
Bills	7	6	3	17	33

at Ralph Wilson Stadium, Orchard Park, New York''

- Game time: 1:00 p.m. EST
- Game weather: 47 °F (8 °C) (Partly Cloudy)
- Game attendance: 70,745
- Referee: Jeff Triplette
- TV announcers (CBS): Ian Eagle (play-by-play) and Solomon Wilcots (color commentator)

Coming off a season-sweeping road win over the Jets, the Bills went home for a Week 9 intraconference duel with the Cincinnati Bengals. with rookie QB Trent Edwards out for a sore right wrist, J. P. Losman got the chance to reclaim his starting job.

In the first quarter, Buffalo drew first blood with Losman completing an 8-yard TD pass to WR Lee Evans that was initially ruled incomplete. The Bengals responded with QB Carson Palmer completing a 15-yard TD pass to WR T. J. Houshmandzadeh. In the second quarter, the Bills went back into the lead with kicker Rian Lindell getting a 23-yard field goal. However, Cincinnati immediately responded with WR/KR Glenn Holt returning the kickoff 100 yards for a touchdown. Buffalo ended the half with Lindell kicking a 21-yard field goal.

In the third quarter, the Bills went back to work with Lindell getting a 21-yard field goal. However, the Bengals answered with Palmer completing a 1-yard TD pass to FB Jeremi Johnson. In the fourth quarter, Buffalo began its final assault with Lindell nailing a 38-yard field goal. Afterwards, rookie RB Marshawn Lynch was a key player as he threw an 8-yard TD pass to TE Robert Royal on a trick play, along with getting his best run of the year with a 56-yard TD run.

With the win, not only did the Bills improve to 4–4, but they have won three-straight games for the first time since 2004.

Losman ended the day completing 24 out of 34 passes for 295 yards with a touchdown and an interception. Meanwhile, Lynch finally managed to get not only his first 100-yard game, but also his first 150-yard game. He ended the day with 29 carries for 153 yards and a touchdown, along with his touchdown pass.

=== Week 10: at Miami Dolphins ===
Quarter	1	2	3	4	Total
Bills	0	0	0	13	13
Dolphins	3	0	7	0	10

at Dolphin Stadium, Miami Gardens, Florida

- Game time: 1:00 PM EDT
- Game weather: 80 °F (27 °C) (Partly Cloudy)
- Game attendance: 70,615
- Referee: Bill Carollo
- TV announcers (CBS): Gus Johnson (play-by-play) and Steve Tasker (color commentator)

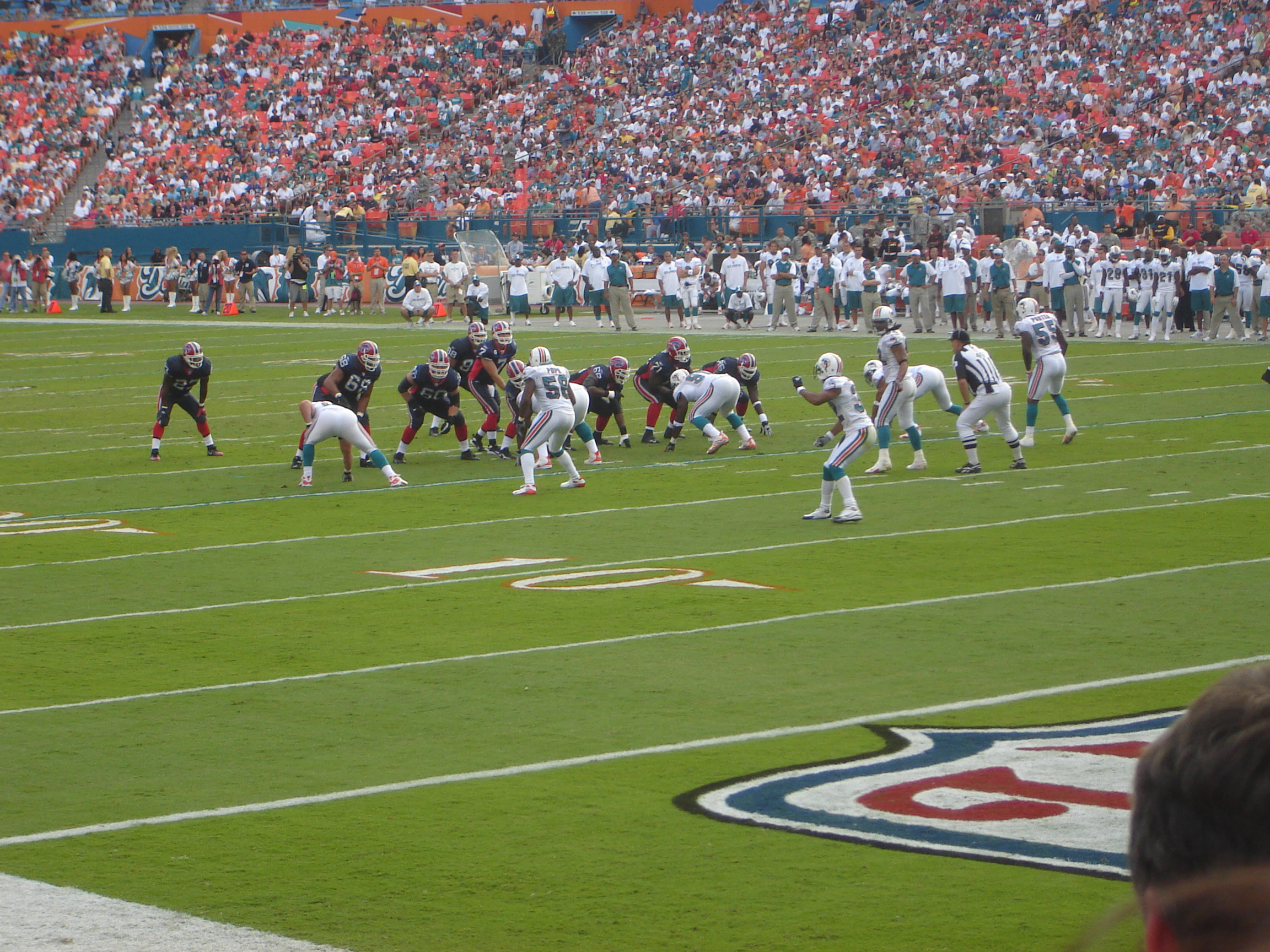
Buffalo at Miami, week 10

Coming off an impressive home win over the Bengals, the Bills flew to Dolphin Stadium for an AFC East duel with the winless Miami Dolphins. In the first quarter, Buffalo trailed early as Dolphins kicker Jay Feely managed to get a 38-yard field goal for the only score of the half. In the third quarter, the Bills began their comeback as DE Chris Kelsay sacked Miami QB Cleo Lemon in the endzone for a safety. However, the Dolphins respond with Lemon getting a 5-yard TD run. In the fourth quarter, Buffalo took control as rookie RB Marshawn Lynch got a 3-yard TD run, along with getting a 2-point conversion run to tie the game. Later in the game, kicker Rian Lindell sealed Miami's fate as he nailed the game-winning 34-yard field goal.

With their fourth-straight win, the Bills improved to 5–4, while Miami remains winless at 0–9.

This win gave Buffalo their first four-game winning streak for the first time since 2004.

=== Week 11: vs. New England Patriots ===
Quarter	1	2	3	4	Total
Patriots	14	21	7	14	56
Bills	7	0	3	0	10

at Ralph Wilson Stadium, Orchard Park, New York

- Game time: 8:15 PM EST
- Game weather: 36 °F (2 °C) (Partly Cloudy)
- Game attendance: 71,338
- Referee: Bill Carollo
- TV announcers (NBC): Al Michaels (play-by-play), John Madden (color commentator), & Andrea Kremer (sideline reporter)

Coming off their close victory over the winless Dolphins, the Bills went home to play the 9–0 New England Patriots, coming off their bye week. The game had just started when Randall Gay picked off J. P. Losman, which led to the Patriots first touchdown, a 6-yard run up the middle by Laurence Maroney. After a Brian Moorman punt, the Patriots scored again, this time on a 43-yard pass from Tom Brady to Randy Moss, with Moss' touchdown breaking the record for most touchdowns by a Patriots receiver in a single season. However, the Bills answered with a 47-yard touchdown pass of their own from Losman to Roscoe Parrish, to cut the lead to 14–7, which was the score at the end of the first quarter.

However, on the first play of the 2nd quarter, Brady hit Moss again for a touchdown from 16 yards out to give them a two score lead again. Seven minutes later, Brady threw his third touchdown of the game, again to Moss. Moss and Brady hooked up for one final touchdown in the first half when Brady hit Moss with only ten seconds left in the first half, giving the Patriots a 35–7 lead at the half.

In the second half, the Patriots added to their lead when, on a 4th down from the 6, Brady hit Benjamin Watson to put the Patriots over 40 points for the fourth time in 2007. The Bills could only muster up a 52-yard field goal by Rian Lindell.

In the 4th quarter, with Maroney out of the game, Kyle Eckel scored a 1-yard touchdown to cap off their final touchdown drive of the night. A minute after the score, Ellis Hobbs recovered a Buffalo fumble and scored from 35-yards out to finish the scoring at 56–10, a season-high for the Patriots, and the most points scored by a road team since 1976, when the Atlanta Falcons put up 62 on the New Orleans Saints. Matt Cassel relieved Brady and finished off the rout for the Patriots. At game's end, New England went over 400 points scored on the season.

With the loss, Buffalo fell to 5–5.

=== Week 12: at Jacksonville Jaguars ===
Quarter	1	2	3	4	Total
Bills	0	7	7	0	14
Jaguars	10	6	3	17	36

at Jacksonville Municipal Stadium, Jacksonville, Florida

- Game time: 1:00 PM EST
- Game weather: 68 °F (20 °C) (Chance of Rain)
- Game attendance: 64,546
- Referee: Peter Morelli
- TV announcers (CBS): Kevin Harlan (play-by-play) & Rich Gannon (color commentator)

Hoping to rebound from their humiliating home loss to the Patriots, the Bills flew to Jacksonville Municipal Stadium for a Week 12 duel with the Jacksonville Jaguars. For QB J. P. Losman, he was playing to keep his starting job.

In the first quarter, Buffalo trailed early as Jaguars RB Fred Taylor got a 50-yard TD run, along with kicker Josh Scobee getting a 46-yard field goal. In the second quarter, Jacksonville increased its lead with Scobee kicking a 33-yard field goal. The Bills managed to get on the board with Losman's 10-yard TD pass to RB Anthony Thomas. The Jaguars ended the half with Scobee getting a 22-yard field goal.

In the third quarter, Jacksonville increased its lead with Scobee kicking a 23-yard field goal. Buffalo managed to respond with WR Roscoe Parrish getting a 24-yard TD run on a reverse. However, in the fourth quarter, the Jaguars took control for the rest of the game as Scobee nailed a 20-yard field goal, QB David Garrard completing a 59-yard TD pass to WR Reggie Williams, and RB Maurice Jones-Drew getting a 17-yard TD run.

With the loss, the Bills fell to 5–6.

=== Week 13: at Washington Redskins ===
Quarter	1	2	3	4	Total
Bills	0	2	6	9	17
Redskins	3	6	7	0	16

at Fedex Field, Landover, Maryland

- Game time: 1:00 PM EST
- Game weather: 40 °F (4 °C) (Cloudy)
- Game attendance: 85,831
- Referee: Tony Corrente
- TV announcers (CBS): Ian Eagle (play-by-play) & Solomon Wilcots (color commentator)

Trying to snap a two-game losing skid, the Bills flew to FedExField for a Week 13 interconference duel with an emotionally charged Washington Redskins. Before the kickoff, the stadium held a memorial service for Sean Taylor, as well as all players across the NFL wearing a #21 sticker on the back of their helmets.

Due to the recent poor play of QB J. P. Losman, rookie QB Trent Edwards once again got the start.

In the first quarter, Buffalo trailed early as Redskins kicker Shaun Suisham managed to get a 27-yard field goal for the only score of the period. In the second quarter, the Bills continued to trail as Suisham kicked a 28-yard field goal. Afterwards, Buffalo got on the board as LB Angelo Crowell sacked Washington QB Jason Campbell in his own endzone for a safety. The Redskins ended the half with Suisham getting a 33-yard field goal.

In the third quarter, the Bills started to reply as kicker Rian Lindell got a 38-yard field goal, yet Washington replied with RB Clinton Portis getting a 3-yard TD run. Buffalo closed out the period with Lindell kicking a 43-yard field goal. In the fourth quarter, Buffalo drew closer as Lindell kicked a 24-yarder, followed by a 33-yard field goal. On the Bills final drive, Lindell managed to set up for a 51-yard field goal. The first try was good, but Redskins Head Coach Joe Gibbs called time out. After the first time out, Gibbs tried to call a second time out, which led to them getting called for unsportsmanlike conduct and the Bills moved 15 yards closer to the end zone, which reduced Lindell's field goal to 36 yards. In the end, Lindell managed to nail the game-winning 36-yard field goal, squeaking a last second win in the dying seconds of the game.

With the win, Buffalo snapped a two-game losing streak and improved to 6–6.

=== Week 14: vs. Miami Dolphins ===
Quarter	1	2	3	4	Total
Dolphins	7	0	10	0	17
Bills	24	7	0	7	38

at Ralph Wilson Stadium, Orchard Park, New York

- Game time: 1:00 p.m. EST
- Game weather: 30 °F (−1 °C) (Cloudy with snow)
- Game attendance: 71,018
- Referee: Scott Green
- TV announcers (CBS): Ian Eagle (play-by-play) & Solomon Wilcots (color commentator)

Coming off their road win over the Redskins, the Bills went home, donned their throwbacks again, and played a Week 14 AFC East rematch with the still-winless Miami Dolphins. In the first quarter, Buffalo drew first blood with rookie QB Trent Edwards completing a 13-yard TD pass and a 28-yard TD pass to TE Robert Royal. Afterwards, the Bills continued their early pounding as Safety George Wilson returned a fumble 20 yards for a touchdown. The Dolphins got on the board with RB Samkon Gado getting a 12-yard TD run, yet Buffalo answered with kicker Rian Lindell getting a 51-yard field goal, setting a new Buffalo Bills record for 18 consecutive field goals (beating Steve Christie's old record of 17; Lindell later missed wide left from 46 yards away). In the second quarter, the Bills continued their domination with Edwards completing a 9-yard TD pass to WR Lee Evans for the only score of the period.

In the third quarter, Miami tried to rally as Gado got a 20-yard TD run, while kicker Jay Feely nailed a 41-yard field goal. In the fourth quarter, Buffalo put the game away as Edwards hooked up with Evans again on a 70-yard TD pass to secure a season sweep.

With the win, the Bills improved to 7–6.

Buffalo's 24 first-quarter points became their most since 1992.

=== Week 15: at Cleveland Browns ===
Quarter	1	2	3	4	Total
Bills	0	0	0	0	0
Browns	3	5	0	0	8

at Cleveland Browns Stadium, Cleveland, Ohio

- Game time: 1:00 p.m. EST
- Game weather: 30 °F (−1 °C) (Snowy)
- Game attendance: 73,196
- Referee: Walt Coleman
- TV announcers (CBS): Gus Johnson (play-by-play) & Steve Tasker (color commentator)

Coming off their dominating win over the Dolphins, the Bills flew to Cleveland Browns Stadium for a Week 15 intraconference duel with the Cleveland Browns in a race for the wild card. The game was played under horrible weather conditions with heavy lake effect snow falling throughout the game making it difficult for either team to move the ball offensively. In the first quarter, Buffalo trailed early as Browns kicker Phil Dawson managed to get a 35-yard field goal for the only score of the period. In the second quarter, the Bills continued to trail as LS Ryan Neill's snap to Punter Brian Moorman went over Moorman's head, causing him to kick the ball through his endzone for a Cleveland safety. Later, the Browns increased their lead with Dawson just managing to nail a 49-yard field goal. Near the end of the game, Buffalo managed to get deep into Cleveland territory. However, the Browns' defense proved to be too much to overcome.

With their first shutout loss since 2003, not only did the Bills fall to 7–7, but it also knocked them out of the playoff race.

=== Week 16: vs. New York Giants ===
Quarter	1	2	3	4	Total
Giants	0	17	0	21	38
Bills	14	0	7	0	21

at Ralph Wilson Stadium, Buffalo, New York

- Game time: 1:00 PM (EST)
- Game weather: 52 °F (11 °C), Windy and Rainy
- Game attendance: 71,302
- Referee: Gene Steratore
- TV announcers (FOX): Kenny Albert (play-by-play), Daryl Johnston (color commentator), & Tony Siragusa (sideline reporter)

Hoping to rebound from their road loss to the Browns, the Bills went home for their last home game of the season as they hosted a Week 16 interconference duel against the New York Giants. In the first quarter, Buffalo got off to a fast start as rookie QB Trent Edwards completed a 3-yard TD pass to TE Michael Gaines and a 4-yard TD pass to WR Lee Evans. In the second quarter, the Giants took the lead with RB Brandon Jacobs getting a 6-yard and a 43-yard TD run, along with kicker Lawrence Tynes getting a 42-yard field goal.

In the third quarter, the Bills regained the lead with rookie RB Marshawn Lynch getting a 3-yard TD run for the only score of the period. However, in the fourth quarter, New York pulled away as LB Kawika Mitchell returning an interception 30 yards for a touchdown, RB Ahmad Bradshaw getting an 88-yard TD run, and CB Corey Webster returning an interception 34 yards for a touchdown.

With the loss, Buffalo fell to 7–8.

=== Week 17: at Philadelphia Eagles ===
Quarter	1	2	3	4	Total
Bills	0	3	6	0	9
Eagles	7	3	7	0	17

at Lincoln Financial Field, Philadelphia

- Game time: 1:00 PM (EST)
- Game weather: 42 °F (6 °C) (Cloudy)
- Game attendance: 68,594
- Referee: Walt Anderson
- TV announcers (CBS): Kevin Harlan (play-by-play) & Rich Gannon (color commentator)

Hoping to end their season on a high note, the Bills flew to Lincoln Financial Field for a Week 17 interconference duel with the Philadelphia Eagles. In the first quarter, Buffalo trailed early as Eagles QB Donovan McNabb completed a 2-yard TD pass to TE Brent Celek for the only score of the period. In the second quarter, Buffalo got on the board with kicker Rian Lindell getting a 29-yard field goal. Philadelphia ended the half with kicker David Akers getting a 38-yard field goal.

In the third quarter, the Bills replied with Lindell kicking a 23-yard field goal. However, the Eagles increased their lead with WR Kevin Curtis recovering a fumble in the endzone for a touchdown. Buffalo answered with Lindell nailing a 22-yard field goal, but Philadelphia held on for the rest of the game.

With the loss, Buffalo ended its season at 7–9, tying its record from last season.

=== Standings ===
AFC East
	W	L	T	PCT	DIV	CONF	PF	PA	STK
^{(1)} New England Patriots	16	0	0	1.000	6–0	12–0	589	274	W16
Buffalo Bills	7	9	0	.438	4–2	6–6	252	354	L3
New York Jets	4	12	0	.250	2–4	4–8	268	355	W1
Miami Dolphins	1	15	0	.063	0–6	1–11	267	437	L2
