= Trent Edwards =

American football player (born 1983)

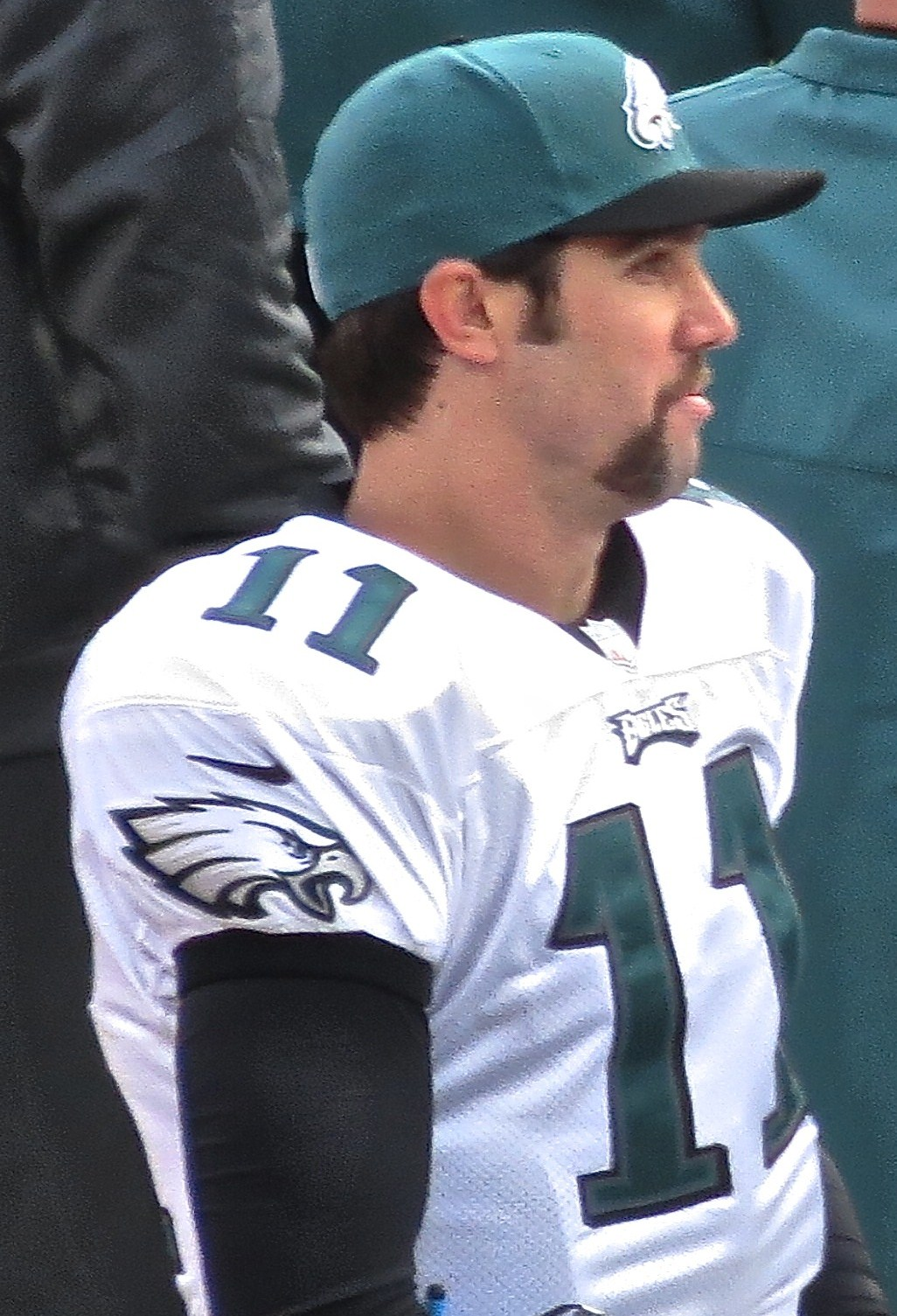
- Edwards with the Philadelphia Eagles in 2012

No. 5, 11
- Position: Quarterback

Personal information
- Born: October 30, 1983 (age 43); Los Gatos, California, U.S.
- Listed height: 6 ft 4 in (1.93 m)
- Listed weight: 230 lb (104 kg)

Career information
- High school: Los Gatos
- College: Stanford (2002–2006)
- NFL draft: 2007: 3rd round, 92nd overall pick

Career history
- Buffalo Bills (2007–2010); Jacksonville Jaguars (2010); Oakland Raiders (2011)*; Philadelphia Eagles (2012); Chicago Bears (2013)*; Oakland Raiders (2014)*
- * Offseason or practice squad member only

Awards and highlights
- PFWA All-Rookie Team (2007)

Career NFL statistics
- Passing attempts: 929
- Passing completions: 563
- Completion percentage: 60.6%
- TD–INT: 26–30
- Passing yards: 6,033
- Passer rating: 75.5
- Stats at Pro Football Reference

Trent Edwards (born October 30, 1983) is an American former professional football player who was a quarterback in the National Football League (NFL). He played college football for the Stanford Cardinal and was selected by the Buffalo Bills in the third round of the 2007 NFL draft. As a rookie, Edwards took over the starting position after an injury to incumbent starter J. P. Losman, leading Buffalo to a 5–1 start in 2008 before injuries and declining play resulted in his own demotion and eventual release from the team in 2010.

He was also a member of the Jacksonville Jaguars, Oakland Raiders, Philadelphia Eagles, and Chicago Bears.

== Early life ==
Edwards was a highly rated recruit from Los Gatos High School and was ranked as the number 1 pro-style quarterback by USA Today in 2001. Rivals.com rated Edwards as the number 2 pro-style quarterback and number 20 player overall in its rankings. He was recruited by Michigan, Florida, Notre Dame and Tennessee, but ultimately chose Stanford. In his junior and senior seasons at Los Gatos, he led the team to two undefeated seasons and back-to-back Central Coast Section Division III championships with a combined record of 26–0. In his senior year, he completed 154 of 213 passes for 2,535 yards, 29 touchdowns, three interceptions, and was named as a National Football Foundation Hall of Fame Scholar-Athlete for Santa Clara County.

As a teenager, Edwards participated in the Armenian-American Summer Games in Northern California. Edwards's grandfather, Ben Morjig, was a co-founder of the games.

== College career ==
At Stanford, Edwards redshirted his freshman year in 2002 and began 2003 behind starter Chris Lewis. After an impressive showing as a backup, Edwards got the start for four games, but was then sidelined with a shoulder injury for the rest of the season. In 2004, Edwards was the starter, but again suffered injuries that knocked him out of two games and kept him out of two others entirely. Edwards' best year was 2005, where he started all 11 games, completed 168 of 268 passes for 1934 yards and 17 touchdowns, leading the Cardinal to a 5–6 record.

In 2006, Edwards was the starter for the first seven games, but suffered a season-ending broken foot against Arizona and relinquished the starting role to T. C. Ostrander. Despite Stanford's poor performance during his tenure as starting quarterback (the Cardinal was just 10–20 in games he started), Edwards was a highly touted quarterback prospect in the 2007 NFL draft due to his arm strength, accuracy, and intelligence. The summer before 2006, Edwards worked as a Synopsys intern. He decided to pass up a career in the electronic design automation industry for the NFL. Prior to the draft, Mel Kiper Jr. projected Edwards as the third-best quarterback in the draft, behind JaMarcus Russell and Brady Quinn.

== Professional career ==
Pre-draft measurables
Height	Weight	Arm length	Hand span	40-yard dash	10-yard split	20-yard split	20-yard shuttle	Three-cone drill	Bench press
6 ft 4 1/8 in (1.93 m)	231 lb (105 kg)	32 3/8 in (0.82 m)	10 in (0.25 m)	4.74 s	1.65 s	2.67 s	4.46 s	7.14 s	19 reps
All values from NFL Combine/Pro Day

=== Buffalo Bills ===
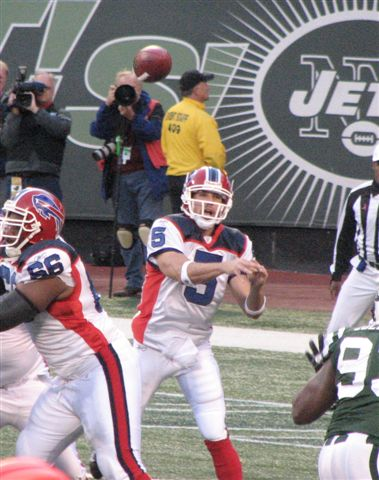
Trent Edwards passes the ball in a 2007 game against the New York Jets.

Edwards was selected by the Buffalo Bills in the third round (92nd overall) of the 2007 NFL draft. Edwards was a part of the Willis McGahee trade that sent McGahee to the Baltimore Ravens for the Ravens' third-round pick in March 2007. After the draft, Hall of Fame coach Bill Walsh contacted Bills general manager Marv Levy to express his confidence in Edwards' abilities.

==== 2007 ====
Edwards made his NFL debut on September 23, 2007, in the Bills' third regular season game against the New England Patriots, after the Bills' starter J. P. Losman was injured in the first quarter. In his first game, Edwards completed 10 of 20 passes for 97 yards with no touchdowns and one interception.

In his first NFL start on September 30, 2007, against the New York Jets, he made 22 of 28 passes for 234 yards with a touchdown and an interception, leading the Bills to their first win of the season. His first NFL touchdown was a one-yard play-action pass on fourth and goal to Michael Gaines. In his second start, against the Dallas Cowboys on Monday Night Football, Edwards completed 23 of 31 pass attempts for 176 yards and an interception as Buffalo narrowly lost 25–24.

During the game against the New York Jets in week 8, Edwards sprained his right wrist, and was held out of the next game, allowing Losman to reclaim the starting job. In week 13, following a string of poor performances by Losman, Bills coach Dick Jauron named Edwards the starter against the Washington Redskins. Edwards led the Bills to a victory over the Redskins in which he led his first fourth quarter comeback, completing three passes to set up the game-winning field goal. As a result, he was named the NFL Rookie of the Week. The following week against the winless Miami Dolphins, he passed for 165 yards and a career-high four touchdown passes to lead the Bills to a 38–17 win. Despite losing the last three games of the season, Edwards was named to the all-rookie team after the season was completed.

==== 2008 ====
With Edwards at the helm, the Bills started the 2008 season with a four-game winning streak, including decisive victories over Seattle in week 1 (34–10) and St. Louis in week 4 (31–14). Edwards shined early, leading comebacks in consecutive games against Jacksonville and Oakland in Weeks 2 and 3, respectively.

Entering Week 5 against the Arizona Cardinals, Buffalo looked to complete its first 5–0 start to a season since 1991. However, on the third play of the game Edwards suffered a concussion as a result of a hard hit by Adrian Wilson and did not return. The Bills eventually lost 41–17 to the eventual NFC champion.

After the team's bye week, Edwards returned for Week 7 against the San Diego Chargers and seemed to not miss a beat, completing 25 of 30 passes in a 23–14 win. He was selected as the FedEx Air Player of the Week for his performance.

Edwards began to struggle after this, however, and the Bills lost four consecutive games. In Week 13, against the San Francisco 49ers, Edwards suffered a groin injury and did not return for the rest of the game. He was sidelined the following two games as a result of the injury. He returned for the final two games of the season. After a 5–1 start, the Bills lost eight of its remaining 10 games and missed the playoffs for the 9th straight season. Many onlookers have opined that Edwards' play declined as a result of the concussion from Wilson.

==== 2009 ====
Edwards' 2009 season was further plagued by inconsistency and injuries. The Bills lost four of their first five games of the season, during which Edwards' play was noted as inconsistent, affected by poor performances by the Bills' offensive line. Within the first 5 games, Edwards was sacked 18 times. Edwards' worst performance during this period was in week 4 against the Dolphins, in which he recorded a season low passer rating of 51.0, threw for a season game-high 3 interceptions, was sacked 6 times, and recorded his only fumble of the season. Notably, the Edwards-led Bills were unable to beat a Cleveland Browns team whose quarterback, Derek Anderson, only completed 2 of 17 passes. Fans began calling Edwards "Trent-ative" and "Captain Checkdown" due to his hesitation to throw the ball deep.

On October 18, Edwards suffered another concussion early in the second quarter against the Jets as a result of a hit by Jets linebackers Harris and Pace. He did not return for the rest of the game, and missed the following two games. He returned after the bye week to start against the Tennessee Titans, but continued to struggle, at one point missing a wide-open Terrell Owens and then throwing an interception that was returned for a touchdown. He finished the game completing 18 of 28 passes for 185 yards with a touchdown and an interception, as the Bills were routed to a 41–17 loss.

Following the game against the Titans, Edwards was benched for the remaining 7 games in favor of Ryan Fitzpatrick. He did not play for the rest of the season except for making a brief appearance during the week 15 game against the New England Patriots when he spelled Fitzpatrick in the fourth quarter. Edwards completed 1 of 2 passes for −1 yards before being carted off the field, injuring his right knee as a result of a sack by Patriots defender Tully Banta-Cain.

==== 2010 ====
Edwards faced competition from Fitzpatrick and Brian Brohm for the Bills' starting quarterback position in 2010. Edwards won the battle and started in all four of the Bills' preseason games. In their first two games of the regular season, Edwards threw for only 241 yards combined and completed only 29 passes between the two games, and the Bills lost both games. On his final play as a Bill, against Green Bay, Edwards ran out of bounds on a fourth down scramble, 7 yards short of the first down marker with 1:10 to go. Edwards was benched the following day in favor of Fitzpatrick, who would become the Bills' full-time starter for the next three seasons. The Bills waived Edwards on September 27, one day after Fitzpatrick threw for 247 yards in a Week Three game against New England.

=== Jacksonville Jaguars ===
Edwards was claimed off waivers by the Jacksonville Jaguars on September 28. He was the backup quarterback behind David Garrard, and wore jersey number five.

Edwards made his first appearance for the Jaguars on October 18, 2010, against the Tennessee Titans on Monday Night Football, when starting quarterback David Garrard left the game after suffering a concussion.

=== Oakland Raiders (first stint) ===
After becoming a free agent following the 2010 season, Edwards signed with the Oakland Raiders on July 30, 2011, and was released on September 3, during the final roster cuts.

=== Philadelphia Eagles ===
On February 23, 2012, Edwards signed a one-year deal with the Philadelphia Eagles.

Edwards had a disappointing mini camp, and was viewed as a roster filler. However, he started to warm up in training camp, and found his opportunity in the preseason, after quarterback Mike Kafka broke his non-throwing hand against the Pittsburgh Steelers. Over the preseason, Edwards went 54-of-80 for 489 yards, with four touchdowns and zero interceptions. The team cut Kafka on August 31, meaning Edwards had won the job as third-string quarterback, after the rookie Nick Foles. Edwards was released on April 15, 2013.

=== Chicago Bears ===
On August 18, 2013, Edwards was signed by the Chicago Bears for one year. Edwards had previously worked out with the Bears during the offseason. He was released by Chicago on August 30.

=== Oakland Raiders (second stint) ===
Edwards was signed by the Oakland Raiders to a futures contract on January 3, 2014. The Raiders released Edwards on August 26.

== Career statistics ==
=== NFL ===
Year	Team	Games			Passing								Rushing				Sacked		Fumbles	
Year	Team	GP	GS	Record	Cmp	Att	Pct	Yds	Y/A	TD	Int	Rtg	Att	Yds	Avg	TD	Sck	SckY	Fum	Lost
2007	BUF	10	9	5–4	151	269	56.1	1,630	6.1	7	8	70.4	14	49	3.5	0	12	105	4	0
2008	BUF	14	14	7–7	245	374	65.5	2,699	7.2	11	10	85.4	36	117	3.3	3	23	143	9	5
2009	BUF	8	7	2–5	110	183	60.1	1,169	6.4	6	7	73.8	14	106	7.6	0	9	79	1	0
2010	BUF	2	2	0–2	29	52	55.8	241	4.6	1	2	58.3	5	24	4.8	0	7	63	0	0
2010	JAX	3	1	0–1	26	49	53.1	280	5.7	1	3	51.4	9	34	3.8	0	4	32	0	0
2012	PHI	1	0	–	2	2	100	14	7	0	0	95.8	0	0	0	0	0	0	0	0
Career		38	33	14–19	563	929	60.6	6,033	6.5	26	30	75.5	78	330	4.2	3	69	482	14	5

=== College ===
Year	Team	Passing								Rushing			
Year	Team	Cmp	Att	Pct	Yds	Y/A	TD	Int	Rtg	Att	Yds	Avg	TD
2003	Stanford	77	170	45.3	750	4.4	4	9	79.5	25	−23	−0.9	1
2004	Stanford	148	271	54.6	1,718	6.3	9	11	110.7	58	32	0.6	1
2005	Stanford	168	268	62.7	1,934	7.2	17	7	139.0	84	153	1.8	0
2006	Stanford	94	156	60.3	1,027	6.6	6	6	120.6	59	37	0.6	0
Career		487	865	56.3	5,429	6.3	36	33	115.1	226	199	0.9	2
