= Ko Simpson =

American football player (born 1983)

No. 30
- Position: Safety

Personal information
- Born: November 9, 1983 (age 42); Rock Hill, South Carolina, U.S.
- Listed height: 6 ft 1 in (1.85 m)
- Listed weight: 202 lb (92 kg)

Career information
- High school: Rock Hill
- College: South Carolina
- NFL draft: 2006: 4th round, 105th overall pick

Career history
- Buffalo Bills (2006–2008); Detroit Lions (2009)

Awards and highlights
- First-team All-American (2005); First-team All-SEC (2005); Second-team All-SEC (2004); SEC Freshman of the Year (2004)

Career NFL statistics
- Total tackles: 174
- Sacks: 1
- Forced fumbles: 1
- Fumble recoveries: 1
- Interceptions: 3
- Stats at Pro Football Reference

Yukota "Ko" Simpson (born November 9, 1983) is an American former professional football player who was a safety in the National Football League (NFL). He was selected by the Buffalo Bills in the fourth round of the 2006 NFL draft. He played college football for the South Carolina Gamecocks. And his 2 sons are Yukota and Kobe Simpson.

He also played for the Detroit Lions.

== Early life ==
Simpson was born in Rock Hill, South Carolina and attended Castle Heights Middle School and Rock Hill High School where he helped lead the team to a Class AAAA State Championship playing on both offense and defense. He signed a letter of intent with South Carolina in 2003, but did not enroll until spring of 2004 under then head coach Lou Holtz.

== College career ==
Simpson attended and played college football at South Carolina. In his freshman season, Simpson recorded 50 solo tackles, 11 assists and six interceptions. Against Georgia, in only his second collegiate game, he intercepted a David Greene pass and returned it 57 yards for a touchdown. He was named SEC Defensive Player of the Week for his performance in the Gamecocks' win over Arkansas which included a fumble recovery returned 57 yards for a touchdown. His six interceptions led the Southeastern Conference and he was named Freshman of the Year in the SEC by the Associated Press, becoming the first South Carolina player to ever win the award.

As a sophomore, Simpson had 103 total tackles, two fumble returns and an interception. He was consensus All-SEC and named a Football Writers Association All-American.

== Professional career ==
Pre-draft measurables
Height	Weight	Arm length	Hand span	40-yard dash	10-yard split	20-yard split	20-yard shuttle	Three-cone drill	Vertical jump	Broad jump	Bench press
6 ft 1 in (1.85 m)	209 lb (95 kg)	32 7/8 in (0.84 m)	9 1/8 in (0.23 m)	4.47 s	1.56 s	2.63 s	4.17 s	7.09 s	40.5 in (1.03 m)	10 ft 2 in (3.10 m)	11 reps
All values from NFL Combine

=== Buffalo Bills ===
Simpson was selected by the Buffalo Bills in the fourth round of the 2006 NFL draft with the 105th overall pick. On September 11, 2007, Simpson was placed on injured reserve.

=== Detroit Lions ===
Simpson was traded to the Detroit Lions for a seventh round pick on September 4, 2009. On November 25, Simpson was placed on injured reserve with a torn patella with a separated MCL.

He was released by the Lions on September 4, 2010.

== NFL statistics ==
Year	Team	Games		Tackles				Fumbles			Interceptions					
Year	Team	G	GS	Comb	Total	Ast	Sack	FF	FR	Yds	Int	Yds	Avg	Lng	TD	PD
2006	BUF	16	15	76	50	26	1.0	1	0	0	2	76	38	76	0	4
2007	BUF	1	1	1	1	0	0.0	0	0	0	0	0	0	0	0	0
2008	BUF	16	11	66	51	15	0.0	0	0	0	0	0	0	0	0	2
2009	DET	8	5	30	26	4	0.0	0	1	0	1	8	8	8	0	4
Career		41	32	173	128	45	1.0	1	1	0	3	81	27	76	0	10

== Personal life ==
On January 1, 2009, Simpson was arrested by a Rock Hill, South Carolina police officer for hindering police while they were attempting to break up an unruly crowd. According to the police report, Simpson verbally abused officers.
