= Robert Royal =

American football player (born 1979)

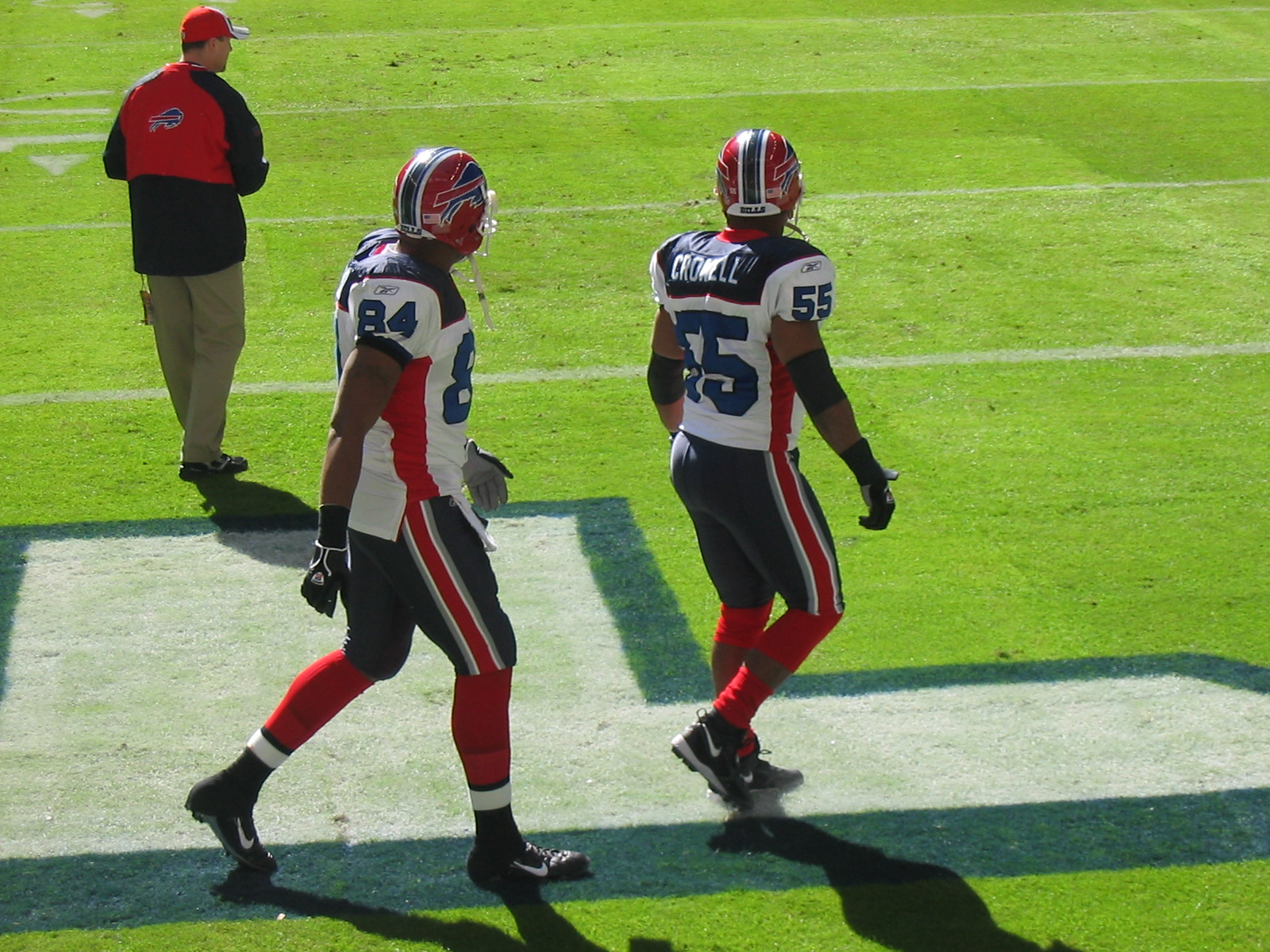
- Royal (left) with Angelo Crowell in 2006

No. 88, 84
- Position: Tight end

Personal information
- Born: May 15, 1979 (age 47); New Orleans, Louisiana, U.S.
- Listed height: 6 ft 4 in (1.93 m)
- Listed weight: 257 lb (117 kg)

Career information
- High school: Edna Karr (New Orleans)
- College: LSU (1998–2001)
- NFL draft: 2002: 5th round, 160th overall pick

Career history
- Washington Redskins (2002–2005); Buffalo Bills (2006–2008); Cleveland Browns (2009–2010)

Awards and highlights
- 2× Second-team All-SEC (2000, 2001)

Career NFL statistics
- Receptions: 128
- Receiving yards: 1,271
- Receiving average: 9.9
- Receiving touchdowns: 14
- Stats at Pro Football Reference

Robert Shelton Royal (born May 15, 1979) is an American former professional football player who was a tight end in the National Football League (NFL). He played college football for the LSU Tigers and was selected by the Washington Redskins in the fifth round of the 2002 NFL draft. He also played in the NFL for the Buffalo Bills and Cleveland Browns.

== Early life ==
Royal attended Edna Karr High School in New Orleans, Louisiana, where he was a standout in football and basketball. In football, as a senior, he posted ten sacks and 80 tackles.

== Professional career ==
=== Washington Redskins ===
Royal was selected 160th overall by the Washington Redskins in the fifth round of the 2002 NFL draft.

=== Buffalo Bills ===
Royal signed with the Buffalo Bills as an unrestricted free agent on March 11, 2006. He was released by the Bills on February 26, 2009.

=== Cleveland Browns ===
After his release from the Bills, Royal was signed by the Cleveland Browns on March 5, 2009.

The Browns released Royal on February 9, 2011.

== NFL career statistics ==
Legend
**Bold**	Career high

=== Regular season ===
Year	Team	Games		Receiving					
Year	Team	GP	GS	Tgt	Rec	Yds	Avg	Lng	TD
2003	WAS	6	6	11	5	48	9.6	20	0
2004	WAS	14	9	15	8	70	8.8	23	**4**
2005	WAS	15	14	35	18	131	7.3	29	1
2006	BUF	**16**	**15**	39	23	233	10.1	**33**	3
2007	BUF	**16**	**15**	38	25	248	9.9	28	3
2008	BUF	15	7	**57**	**33**	**351**	10.6	30	1
2009	CLE	13	11	26	11	134	**12.2**	29	1
2010	CLE	15	4	12	5	56	11.2	20	1
		110	81	233	128	1,271	9.9	33	14

=== Playoffs ===
Year	Team	Games		Receiving					
Year	Team	GP	GS	Tgt	Rec	Yds	Avg	Lng	TD
2005	WAS	**2**	**2**	**3**	**3**	**3**	**1.0**	**5**	0
		2	2	3	3	3	1.0	5	0
