= John Wendling =

American football player (born 1983)

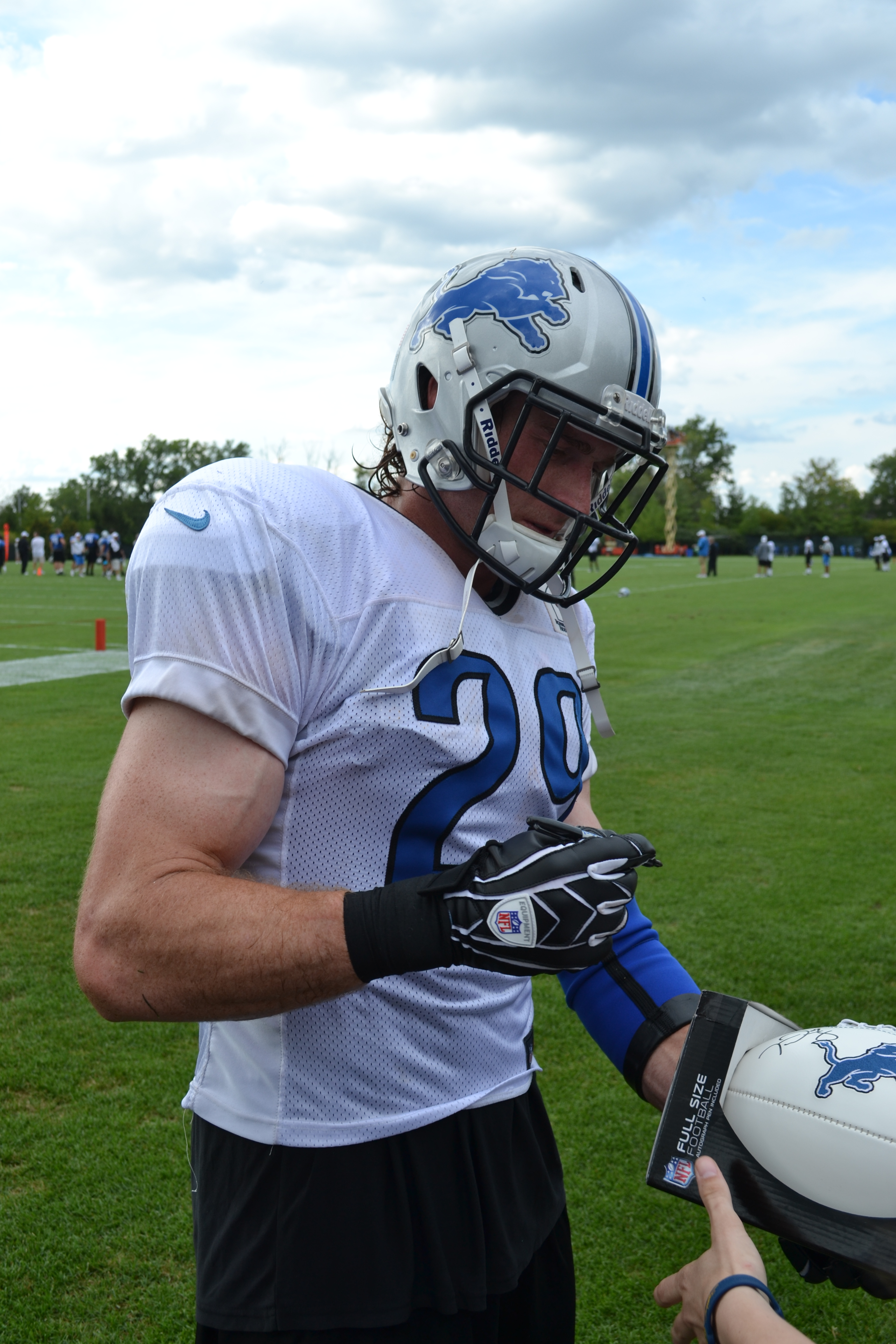
- Wendling with the Detroit Lions in 2012

No. 29, 21
- Positions: Safety, special teamer

Personal information
- Born: June 4, 1983 (age 43); Cody, Wyoming, U.S.
- Listed height: 6 ft 1 in (1.85 m)
- Listed weight: 222 lb (101 kg)

Career information
- High school: Rock Springs (Rock Springs, Wyoming)
- College: Wyoming
- NFL draft: 2007: 6th round, 184th overall pick

Career history
- Buffalo Bills (2007–2009); Detroit Lions (2010–2013)

Awards and highlights
- First-team All-MW (2006)

Career NFL statistics
- Total tackles: 148
- Fumble recoveries: 1
- Pass deflections: 1
- Interceptions: 1
- Stats at Pro Football Reference

John Wendling (born June 4, 1983) is an American former professional football player who was a safety in the National Football League (NFL). He was selected by the Buffalo Bills in the sixth round (184th overall) of the 2007 NFL draft. He played college football for the Wyoming Cowboys.

During the 2009 and 2010 seasons, Wendling saw most of his playing time as a gunner on special teams. He led the Bills in special teams tackles in 2009, and also led the Lions in 2010.

== Early life ==
John Wendling was born on June 4, 1983, in Cody, Wyoming. He attended Rock Springs High School in Rock Springs, Wyoming.

== College career ==
Wendling played college football for the Wyoming Cowboys. He redshirted as a freshman in 2002. In his redshirt freshman season, he played on special teams, ending up with two blocked kicks. During his sophomore redshirt season 2004, Wendling led the Cowboys in tackles with 89, and garnered Honorable Mention All-Conference honors. He also had a huge game against Air Force, making 11 tackles and breaking up two passes in a 43-26 victory over Air Force, eventually to be named MWC Defensive Player of the Week. Wendling also succeeded in his junior season, and once again earned Honorable Mention All-Conference honors.

== Professional career ==
=== Buffalo Bills ===
Wendling was selected by the Buffalo Bills in the sixth round with the 184th overall pick in the 2007 NFL draft. He signed a contract with the team on July 24, 2007. He was waived on February 16, 2010.

=== Detroit Lions ===
Wendling signed with the Detroit Lions on August 27, 2010.

Wendling was named a special teams Pro Bowl alternate for the NFC during the 2010 NFL season.

Wendling's contract ran out following the 2013 season and he was not re-signed by the Lions.

== Career statistics ==
Legend
**Bold**	Career high

=== NFL ===
==== Regular season ====
Year	Team	Games		Tackles					Interceptions					Fumbles			
Year	Team	GP	GS	Cmb	Solo	Ast	Sck	TFL	Int	Yds	TD	Lng	PD	FF	FR	Yds	TD
2007	BUF	14	0	10	10	0	0.0	0	0	0	0	0	0	0	**1**	0	0
2008	BUF	16	0	13	10	3	0.0	0	0	0	0	0	0	0	0	0	0
2009	BUF	16	0	27	20	7	0.0	0	**1**	0	0	0	**1**	0	0	0	0
2010	DET	16	0	**30**	22	**8**	0.0	0	0	0	0	0	0	0	0	0	0
2011	DET	16	1	25	20	5	0.0	0	0	0	0	0	0	0	0	0	0
2012	DET	16	3	29	**23**	6	0.0	0	0	0	0	0	0	0	0	0	0
2013	DET	16	0	14	10	4	0.0	0	0	0	0	0	0	0	0	0	0
Career		110	4	148	115	33	0.0	0	1	0	0	0	1	0	1	0	0

==== Postseason ====
Year	Team	Games		Tackles					Interceptions					Fumbles			
Year	Team	GP	GS	Cmb	Solo	Ast	Sck	TFL	Int	Yds	TD	Lng	PD	FF	FR	Yds	TD
2011	DET	1	0	1	1	0	0.0	0	0	0	0	0	0	0	0	0	0
Career		1	0	1	1	0	0.0	0	0	0	0	0	0	0	0	0	0

=== College ===
Year	Games	Tackles	Assisted tackles	Interceptions	Yds	TD
2004	5	**56**	33	**3**	7	0
2005	3	0	0	**3**	2	0
2006	5	38	**40**	1	**15**	0
Total	13	94	73	7	24	0

== Personal life ==
Wendling's wife suggested that he grow out a mullet while watching a Colorado Rockies baseball game in which one of the players donned the prolific hairstyle. Wendling's teammate Reggie Bush referred to him as "Joe Dirt" due to Wendling's resemblance to David Spade's character in the 2001 comedy film by the same name.
