= Kirk Chambers =

American football player and coach (born 1979)

No. 65, 73
- Position: Offensive tackle

Personal information
- Born: March 19, 1979 (age 47); Provo, Utah, U.S.
- Listed height: 6 ft 7 in (2.01 m)
- Listed weight: 315 lb (143 kg)

Career information
- High school: Provo
- College: Stanford (1999–2003)
- NFL draft: 2004: 6th round, 176th overall pick

Career history

Playing
- Cleveland Browns (2004–2005); Buffalo Bills (2007–2009); Cincinnati Bengals (2010); Detroit Lions (2011)*; Atlanta Falcons (2011)
- * Offseason or practice squad member only

Coaching
- Spanish Fork High School (2012–2015) Head coach; Provo High School (2015–present) Co-athletic director/offensive line coach

Career NFL statistics
- Games played: 70
- Games started: 14
- Stats at Pro Football Reference

Kirk Chambers (born March 19, 1979) is an American former professional football player who was an offensive tackle in the National Football League (NFL). He played college football for the Stanford Cardinal and was selected by the Cleveland Browns in the sixth round of the 2004 NFL draft. He was also a member of the Buffalo Bills, Cincinnati Bengals, Detroit Lions and Atlanta Falcons before becoming a high school football coach in the 2010s.

== Early life ==
Chambers graduated from Provo High School in 1997. For three years he started both on offense and defense. He was a member of championship winning basketball teams at Provo High in 1995 and 1997. Chambers also participated in student government, Mr. Provo High, track and field, and the Chamber Choir.

A distinguished high school athlete, Chambers was heavily recruited by Stanford University and by his home town school Brigham Young University, eventually selecting the Cardinal.

Before playing at Stanford, however, Chambers served a two-year church mission for the Church of Jesus Christ of Latter-day Saints in Berlin, Germany.

== College career ==
Chambers started all 45 games in which he played for Stanford University.

== Professional career ==
=== Cleveland Browns ===
Chambers was drafted 176th overall in the sixth round of the 2004 NFL draft by the Cleveland Browns. He spent two seasons with the team, appearing in 21 games with no starts.

=== Buffalo Bills ===
After spending the 2006 season out of football, Chambers signed a free-agent contract with the Buffalo Bills on January 25, 2007. He played in all 32 games for the team over the following two season, starting five.

Chambers re-signed with the Bills in March 2009. He was released during final cuts on September 5, only to be re-signed three days later after offensive tackle Langston Walker was released. He was again released during the final cuts on September 4, 2010.

=== Cincinnati Bengals ===
He was signed by the Cincinnati Bengals on November 16, 2010.

=== Detroit Lions ===
On August 11, 2011, Chambers signed with the Detroit Lions. Chambers was released from the Lions on the final day of cuts.

=== Atlanta Falcons ===
The Atlanta Falcons signed Chambers on October 25, 2011.

== Personal life ==
His father was a high school German teacher, so Chambers speaks fluent German. He also earned the rank of Eagle Scout while a member in the Boy Scouts of America.

He is a member of the Church of Jesus Christ of Latter-day Saints.

After the 2011 NFL season Chambers chose to become the head football coach at Spanish Fork High School in Spanish Fork, Utah. In April 2015, he resigned as head football coach at Spanish Fork High School to become a Co-Athletic Director with Phil Olsen at Provo High School.
