= Ryan Neill =

American football player (born 1982)

No. 72, 92, 58
- Position: Defensive end

Personal information
- Born: December 12, 1982 (age 43); Wayne, New Jersey. U.S.
- Listed height: 6 ft 3 in (1.91 m)
- Listed weight: 253 lb (115 kg)

Career information
- High school: Wayne Hills
- College: Rutgers
- NFL draft: 2006: undrafted

Career history
- Buffalo Bills (2006–2008); St. Louis Rams (2009); San Diego Chargers (2010)

Awards and highlights
- 2× All-Big East (2004–2005)

Career NFL statistics
- Games played: 43
- Total tackles: 13
- Stats at Pro Football Reference

Ryan Neill (born December 12, 1982) is an American former professional football player who was a defensive end and long snapper in the National Football League (NFL). He was signed by the Buffalo Bills as an undrafted free agent in 2006. He grew up in Wayne, New Jersey, and played college football for the Rutgers Scarlet Knights. In the NFL, Neill also played for the St. Louis Rams and San Diego Chargers.

== Early life ==
Ryan Neill is the son of former New York Giants nose tackle, Bill Neill. He attended Wayne Hills High School, New Jersey and was an All-State selection by the Associated Press and Gannett News, adding All-State Group 3 and All-State recognition from the Star Ledger. Neill was also a member of the Super 100 All-State Football Team that was selected by the New Jersey Football Coaches Association. While at Wayne Hills he compiled a 33–3 record in his three seasons as a starter. In 2000, he recorded 106 tackles and 16 sacks. He also forced four fumbles, and recovered two, returning one for 20 yards for a score.

== College career ==
In 41 games at Rutgers University, Neill started 35 games and recorded 176 tackles (82 solos) with 19 sacks and made 41 stops for losses and was credited with 28 quarterback pressures, three fumble recoveries and three forced fumbles... he also had three pass deflections and a 31-yard interception return for a touchdown. He is fifth in school history with his 19.0 quarterback sacks, topped only by Nate Toran (52, 1973–76), Dan Gray (29, 1975–77), Dino Mangiero (26, 1976–79) and Shawn Williams (21, 1989–92).

His ten sacks in 2005, rank seventh on Rutgers' season-record list and as a senior was a Sports Illustrated honorable mention All-American Selection. He was also an Academic All-American choice and was First-team All-Big East Conference and Academic All-Big East accolades. He was also named the team's MVP. Neill was of three finalists for the Ted Hendricks Trophy (nations best Defensive End, 2005 winner Tamba Hali). He started all season at right defensive end and ranked second in the Big East and eighth nationally with 21.5 stops for losses and ranked second in the conference with 10.0 sacks and added 24 quarterback pressures, three forced fumbles and a fumble recovery.

As a junior in 2004, Neill was First-team All-Big East Conference after starting every game at right defensive end, recording 43 tackles (18 solos) and ranked second in the Big East with 8.0 sacks, 13 stops for losses and four quarterback pressures, recovered a fumble and deflected a pass.

During the 2002, season Neill suffered a severe knee injury. His knee was reconstructed by Russell Warren, M.D.. Following a medical redshirt year in 2003, Neill returned to the field in 2004. In his first game, he intercepted a pass and returned it for a touchdown to lead Rutgers past Michigan State.

== Professional career ==
=== Buffalo Bills ===
Neill was an undrafted free agent and signed with the Buffalo Bills. He contributed at defensive end in 2006, 2007, 2008 and handled the long-snapping duties for the Bills in 2007 and 2008.

=== St. Louis Rams ===
After long snapper Chris Massey was injured, the St. Louis Rams signed Neill to handle those duties for the remainder of the season.

=== San Diego Chargers ===
Neill signed with the San Diego Chargers on September 17, 2010. He suffered a leg fracture on September 26, 2010, in a game against the Seattle Seahawks. He finished the 2010 season on injured reserve.
