= Jon Corto =

American football player (born 1984)

No. 33, 57
- Position: Safety

Personal information
- Born: September 3, 1984 (age 42); Orchard Park, New York, U.S.
- Listed height: 6 ft 0 in (1.83 m)
- Listed weight: 208 lb (94 kg)

Career information
- High school: Orchard Park
- College: Sacred Heart
- NFL draft: 2007: undrafted

Career history
- Buffalo Bills (2007–2011)

Awards and highlights
- All-American (2006); All-NEC (2006)

Career NFL statistics
- Total tackles: 37
- Forced fumbles: 1
- Stats at Pro Football Reference

Jon Corto (born September 3, 1984) is an American former professional football player who was a safety in the National Football League (NFL). He was signed by the Buffalo Bills as an undrafted free agent in 2007. He played college football for the Sacred Heart Pioneers.

== Early life ==
Corto played his high school football in Orchard Park, New York. He grew up a fan of the Buffalo Bills and lived only a few miles from the team's stadium.

== College career ==
In his senior year at Sacred Heart University, Corto had a team-leading 104 tackles, 54 solo, ranking second in the conference. He averaged 9.5 tackles per game with 4.5 sacks and 11.0 tackles for loss on the year. For his stellar senior year he received 2006 All-American honors as well as first-team All-Northeast Conference.

He finished his career at SHU as the program's second all-time leading tackler with 300 tackles over four years, he added 15 sacks as well.

== Professional career ==
After impressing in rookie mini camp, Corto signed with the Buffalo Bills. Corto was converted to safety by the Bills, and was with the team's practice squad for the 2007 season. In 2008, Corto was elevated to the teams active roster and appeared in all sixteen games, while primarily playing on special teams. Between 2008 and 2010 he appeared in 43 games, before spending the entire 2011 season on injured reserve.

The Bills released Corto in February 2012 and he subsequently retired.

== Personal life ==
In 2011 Jon and his wife Jen founded Buffalo Strive Vending, a full service vending company that focuses on healthy options. The couple has three children together, two boys and a girl.
