= Bobby April =

American football coach (born 1953)

Personal information
- Born: April 15, 1953 (age 73); New Orleans, Louisiana, U.S.

Career information
- High school: Chalmette (LA)
- College: Nicholls

Career history
- Chalmette (LA) HS (1976–1977) Assistant coach; Southern Miss (1978) Graduate assistant; Tulane (1979) Tight ends coach; Arizona (1980–1986) Defensive line coach & secondary coach; Southern California (1987–1990) Secondary coach & kicking coach; Ohio State (1990) Secondary coach; Atlanta Falcons (1991–1993) Tight ends & special teams coach; Pittsburgh Steelers (1994–1995) Special teams coach; New Orleans Saints (1996–1999) Special teams coach; St. Louis Rams (2001–2003) Special teams coordinator; Buffalo Bills (2004–2009) Assistant head coach & special teams coordinator; Philadelphia Eagles (2010–2012) Special teams coordinator; Oakland Raiders (2013–2014) Special teams coordinator; New York Jets (2015) Special teams coordinator; Tennessee Titans (2016) Special teams coordinator; LSU (2017) Special teams analyst

Awards and highlights
- 2× NFL Special Teams Coach of the Year (2004, 2008)

Robert April Jr. (born April 15, 1953) is an American football coach. He has held various special teams coaching positions in the National Football League (NFL).

== Coaching career ==
=== College career ===
April coached college football at Southern Mississippi, Tulane, Arizona, Southern California, Ohio State and LSU.

=== Professional career ===
April has coached at the NFL level with the Atlanta Falcons, Pittsburgh Steelers, New Orleans Saints, St. Louis Rams, Buffalo Bills, Philadelphia Eagles, Oakland Raiders, New York Jets and Tennessee Titans.

He has won two NFL Special teams coach of the year awards, one in 2004, and another in 2008.

== Personal life ==
His son, Bobby April III, is a college and NFL coach.
