= Felton Huggins =

American football coach (born 1983)

Current position
- Title: Head coach
- Team: Kentucky State
- Conference: SIAC
- Record: 17–16

Biographical details
- Born: February 15, 1983 (age 43); Zachary, Louisiana, U.S.
- Education: Southeastern Louisiana University (2006)

Playing career
- 2002: Grambling State
- 2003–2005: Southeastern Louisiana
- 2006: Jacksonville Jaguars*
- 2007: Frankfurt Galaxy
- 2007–2010: Buffalo Bills*
- Position: Wide receiver

Coaching career (HC unless noted)
- 2012: Loranger HS (LA) (WR)
- 2013–2015: LaGrange (WR)
- 2016: LaGrange (OC/QB)
- 2017: LaGrange (WR)
- 2018: LaGrange (AHC/OC/WR)
- 2019–2020: Charleston Southern (OC/WR)
- 2021: Slaughter Charter (LA) (OC)
- 2022: McNeese (WR)
- 2023–present: Kentucky State

Head coaching record
- Overall: 17–16
- Tournaments: 0–1 (NCAA D-II playoffs)

Accomplishments and honors

Awards
- SIAC Coach of the Year (2025)

Felton Huggins Jr. (born February 15, 1983) is an American college football coach. He is the head football coach for Kentucky State University, a position he has held since 2023. He also coached for Loranger High School, LaGrange, Charleston Southern, Slaughter Community Charter School, and McNeese. He played college football for Grambling State and Southeastern Louisiana as a wide receiver. He played professionally for the Jacksonville Jaguars and Buffalo Bills of the National Football League (NFL) and the Frankfurt Galaxy of NFL Europe.

== Head coaching record ==
Year	Team	Overall	Conference	Standing	Bowl/playoffs
Kentucky State Thorobreds (Southern Intercollegiate Athletic Conference) (2023–present)
2023	Kentucky State	3–7	2–6	T–9th	
2024	Kentucky State	5–6	4–4	T–6th	
2025	Kentucky State	9–3	7–1	T–2nd	L NCAA Division II First Round
2026	Kentucky State	0–0	0–0		
Kentucky State:		17–16	13–11		
Total:		17–16			
