= Michael Gaines =

American football player (born 1980)

No. 84, 86
- Position: Tight end

Personal information
- Born: March 30, 1980 (age 46); Tallahassee, Florida, U.S.
- Listed height: 6 ft 2 in (1.88 m)
- Listed weight: 267 lb (121 kg)

Career information
- High school: Florida State University (Tallahassee)
- College: UCF
- NFL draft: 2004: 7th round, 232nd overall pick

Career history
- Carolina Panthers (2004–2006); Buffalo Bills (2007); Detroit Lions (2008); Chicago Bears (2009); Cleveland Browns (2009); Houston Texans (2010)*
- * Offseason or practice squad member only

Career NFL statistics
- Receptions: 84
- Receiving yards: 889
- Receiving touchdowns: 6
- Stats at Pro Football Reference

Michael J. Gaines (born March 30, 1980) is an American former professional football player who was a tight end in the National Football League (NFL). He played college football for the UCF Knights and was selected by the Carolina Panthers in the seventh round of the 2004 NFL draft.

Gaines also played for the Buffalo Bills, Detroit Lions, Chicago Bears and Cleveland Browns.

== Early life ==
Gaines attended Florida High School which is a developmental school associated with Florida State University As a football standout, he played six different positions, including backup quarterback and finished his high school career with 56 receptions, 1,715 receiving yards and 20 touchdowns. He earned first-team all-state recognition as a junior and senior and registered 20 receptions for 535 yards and nine touchdowns in addition to collecting 110 tackles on defense as a senior. Gaines was rated the number one tight end in Florida. He was the first player from his school to participate in the Florida-Georgia High School All-Star Game.

== College career ==
Gaines played in 23 games with four starts for the University of Central Florida. He recorded 22 receptions for 306 yards and three touchdowns. In 2003, he was selected to play in the Blue-Gray Game.

During Gaines Junior season at UCF, he had a stellar breakout game against Toledo, (Ohio). During the game, Gaines caught what was to have been a short yard gain for a first down, but he displayed balance and athleticism that caught the eye of NFL scouts. Gaines proved to be virtually unstoppable against the Toledo defense.

== Professional career ==
At 6'4 and close to 280 pounds, Gaines has the reputation of a blocking tight end, often lining up in double tight end or goal line formations. Through the 2007 NFL season, Gaines has started 35 of the 57 games he has played in. In 2007 with the Bills, Gaines set career highs in receptions (25) and reception yardage (215). He tied a career-high with 2 touchdown receptions.

=== Carolina Panthers ===
One of four rookie draft choices to start a game for Carolina in 2004, along with Keary Colbert, Chris Gamble, and Travelle Wharton.

=== Buffalo Bills ===
On September 10, 2007, he signed with the Buffalo Bills. His first touchdown catch as a Buffalo Bill came on October 28 on a fourth and goal situation.

=== Detroit Lions ===
Michael Gaines DE On March 3, 2008, he signed with the Detroit Lions. He was released on April 29, 2009.

=== Chicago Bears ===
Gaines signed a 1-year deal with the Chicago Bears on May 11, 2009. He was released on October 17 after the Bears acquired Gaines Adams from the Tampa Bay Buccaneers.

=== Cleveland Browns ===
Gaines signed with the Cleveland Browns on October 21, 2009.

=== Houston Texans ===
Gaines signed with the Houston Texans on April 23, 2010, but was released in the preseason.
