= Langston Walker =

American football player (born 1979)

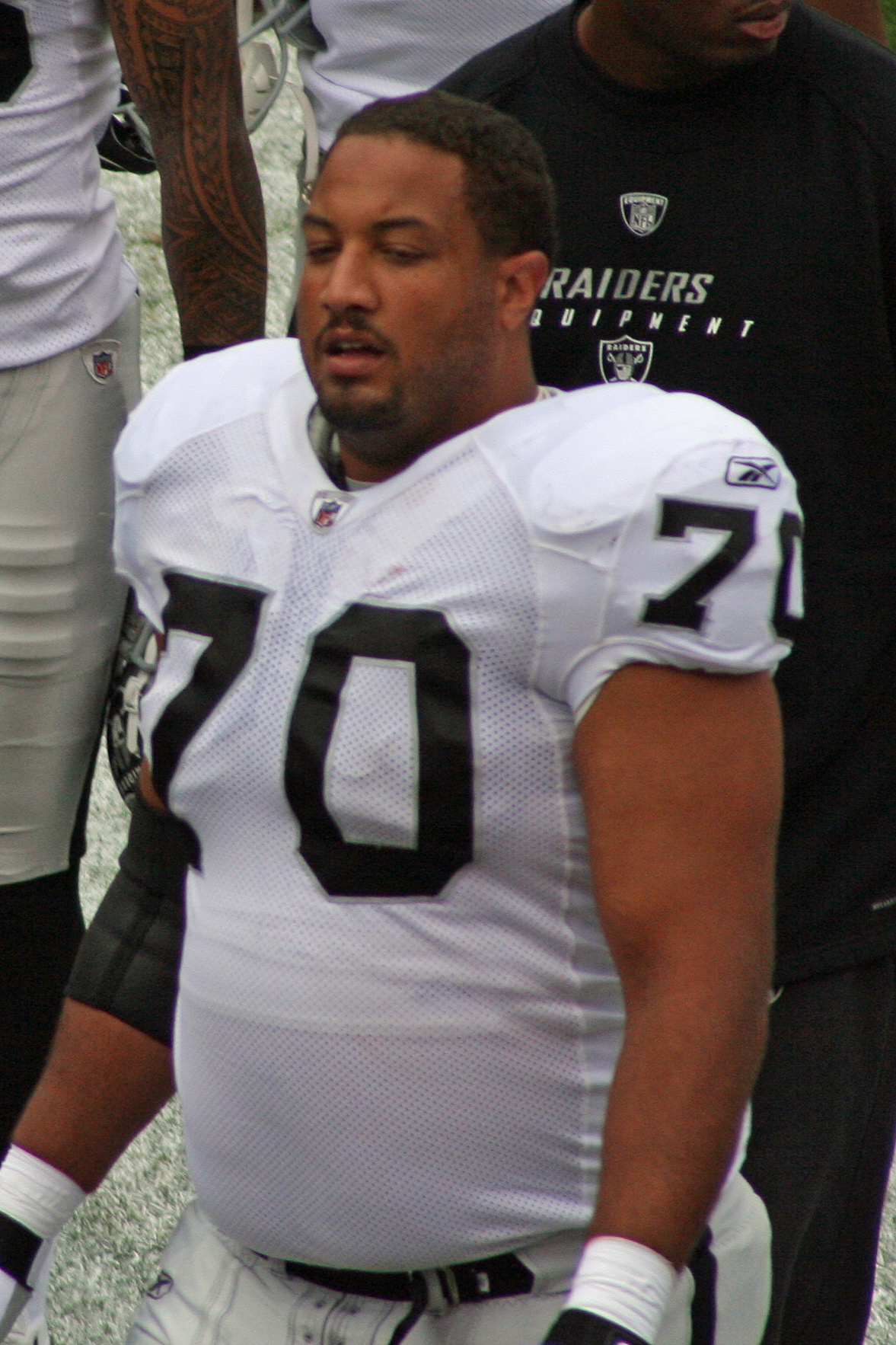
- Walker with the Oakland Raiders in 2010

No. 66, 68, 70
- Position: Offensive tackle

Personal information
- Born: September 3, 1979 (age 47); Oakland, California, U.S.
- Listed height: 6 ft 8 in (2.03 m)
- Listed weight: 360 lb (163 kg)

Career information
- High school: Bishop O'Dowd (Oakland)
- College: California (1997–2001)
- NFL draft: 2002: 2nd round, 53rd overall pick

Career history
- Oakland Raiders (2002–2006); Buffalo Bills (2007–2008); Oakland Raiders (2009–2010)

Career NFL statistics
- Games played: 120
- Games started: 82
- Fumble recoveries: 2
- Stats at Pro Football Reference

Langston Branden Walker (born September 3, 1979) is an American former professional football player who was an offensive tackle in the National Football League (NFL). He played college football for the California Golden Bears and was selected by the Oakland Raiders in the second round of the 2002 NFL draft. Walker also played for the Buffalo Bills. He resides in his hometown of Oakland.

== Early life ==
Walker attended Bishop O’Dowd High School where he was an all-state offensive lineman, having helped Bishop O’Dowd to a 10–1 record as a senior after an 11–2 mark the previous year. He also played defense as a lineman.

== Professional career ==
=== Oakland Raiders (first stint) ===
Walker was frequently used as a field goal blocker. He blocked a potential game-winning field goal against the Denver Broncos on November 28, 2004.

=== Buffalo Bills ===
Walker was the starting right tackle for the Bills since coming to Buffalo as an unrestricted free agent March 2, 2007. Walker and the Bills agreed to a 5-year, $25 million contract with a $10 million signing bonus.

Walker started all 16 games in 2007. He was part of offensive line that allowed only 26 sacks, the fewest allowed by Buffalo since sacks became an official NFL statistic in 1982. He helped pave the way for over 100 yards rushing in 11 of 16 games and a 112.5 yards per game rushing average.

In 2008 Walker hosted the internet series 68 Seconds with Langston Walker.

Despite being expected to replace Jason Peters at left tackle in 2009, the Bills released Walker after failed attempts to trade him on September 8.

=== Oakland Raiders (second stint) ===
Walker was re-signed by the Oakland Raiders on October 14, 2009, and assigned No. 70. He was re-signed on April 2, 2010.
