= 2009 Buffalo Bills season =

50th season in franchise history

- Bills 50th season logo
- Owner: Ralph Wilson
- General manager: Russ Brandon
- Head coach: Dick Jauron (fired November 17, 3–6 record); Perry Fewell (interim, 3–4 record)
- Home stadium: Ralph Wilson Stadium; Rogers Centre

Results
- Record: 6–10
- Division place: 4th AFC East
- Playoffs: Did not qualify
- Pro Bowlers: S Jairus Byrd

The 2009 season was the Buffalo Bills' 40th season in the National Football League (NFL) the 50th overall and the fourth and final under the head coach Dick Jauron.

The Bills brought in star receiver Terrell Owens in an attempt to revitalize the fanbase and improve the receiving corps for embattled quarterback Trent Edwards. However, they were unable to improve upon their third consecutive 7–9 regular-season record (2006, 2007 and 2008) and failed to make the playoffs for the 10th consecutive year, the longest-standing playoff drought in the NFL which did not end until the 2017 season.

Jauron returned as head coach for a fourth season, the first Bills coach since Marv Levy to receive a contract extension beyond three years. He was fired on November 17 after a 3–6 start, and was replaced on an interim basis by defensive coordinator Perry Fewell, who was fired at the end of the season, but not before starting Ryan Fitzpatrick at quarterback for the rest of the season.

In addition, running back Fred Jackson emerged as an effective starter, eclipsing 1,000 rushing yards in the wake of Marshawn Lynch dealing with an early-season suspension and injuries.

With the 2009 season, the Bills became one of only two non-expansion teams to not make the playoffs in the 2000s (the other being the Detroit Lions).

== Offseason ==
=== Notable roster additions ===
- WR Terrell Owens – Signed March 7. – Former Team: Dallas Cowboys
- CB Drayton Florence – Signed March 3. – Former Team: Jacksonville Jaguars
- QB Ryan Fitzpatrick – Signed February 27. – Former Team: Cincinnati Bengals
- C Geoff Hangartner – Signed February 28. – Former team: Carolina Panthers
- RB Dominic Rhodes – Signed April 18. But released September 5 – Former Team: Indianapolis Colts

=== Notable roster losses ===
- OG Derrick Dockery – Released February 26. Dockery re-joined the Washington Redskins.
- QB J. P. Losman – Allowed to leave as a free agent. After not receiving any interest from the NFL, signed with the Las Vegas Locomotives of the United Football League in June 2009.
- TE Robert Royal – Released February 26. Royal signed a contract to join the Cleveland Browns.
- LT Jason Peters – Traded to the Philadelphia Eagles. Traded for the 28th (Eric Wood) and 121st pick (Shawn Nelson) in the 2009 NFL draft and a conditional 6th round pick in the 2010 NFL draft.
- LT/RT Langston Walker – Released September 8. Re-signed with the Oakland Raiders.

=== NFL draft ===
The Bills drafted three players—Eric Wood, Andy Levitre and Jairus Byrd—who would later become starters on the team. Byrd was runner-up in Defensive Rookie of the Year voting. First round pick Aaron Maybin was released from the Bills shortly before the 2011 season after two disappointing seasons with the team.

= Pro Bowler

Round	Pick #	Player	Position	College
1	11	Aaron Maybin	Defensive end	Penn State
1	28	Eric Wood	Center	Louisville
2	42	Jairus Byrd	Safety	Oregon
2	51	Andy Levitre	Guard	Oregon State
4	121	Shawn Nelson	Tight end	Southern Miss
5	147	Nic Harris	Safety	Oklahoma
6	183	Cary Harris	Cornerback	USC
7	220	Ellis Lankster	Cornerback	West Virginia

=== Undrafted free agents ===
2009 undrafted free agents of note
Player	Position	College
Nick Hennessey	Tackle	Colgate
Ryan Manalac	Linebacker	Cincinnati
Ashlee Palmer	Linebacker	Ole Miss
Garrison Sanborn	Long snapper	Florida State

== Staff ==
Buffalo Bills 2009 staff
Front office: Owner/founder/president – Ralph Wilson; Head coaches: Head coach – Dick Jauron; Assistant head coach/special teams coordinator – Bobby April; Assistant to the head coach/special projects – Chuck Lester; Offensive coaches: Offensive coordinator/quarterbacks – Alex Van Pelt; Running game coordinator/running backs – Eric Studesville; Wide receivers – Tyke Tolbert; Tight ends – Charlie Coiner; Offensive line – Sean Kugler; Assistant offensive line – Ray Brown; Offensive quality control – Nathaniel Hackett	Defensive coaches: Interim head coach/defensive coordinator – Perry Fewell; Defensive line – Bob Sanders; Linebackers – Matt Sheldon; Defensive backs – George Catavolos; Defensive/special teams assistant – Cannon Matthews; Defensive quality control – Adrian White; Pass rush consultant – Joe Kim; Special teams coaches: Special teams assistant/assistant linebackers – DeMontie Cross; Strength and conditioning: Head strength and conditioning – John Allairie; Strength and conditioning assistant – Dan Liburd

== Roster ==
2009 Buffalo Bills roster
Quarterbacks (QB): 4 Brian Brohm; 5 Trent Edwards; 14 Ryan Fitzpatrick; 10 Gibran Hamdan; Running backs (RB): 22 Fred Jackson; 23 Marshawn Lynch; 38 Corey McIntyre FB; Wide receivers (WR): 83 Lee Evans; 84 James Hardy; 17 Justin Jenkins; 13 Stevie Johnson; 81 Terrell Owens; 11 Roscoe Parrish KR/PR; 82 Josh Reed; Tight ends (TE): 87 Joe Klopfenstein; 89 Shawn Nelson; 88 Jonathan Stupar	Offensive linemen (OL): 73 Kirk Chambers T; 61 Christian Gaddis C; 63 Geoff Hangartner C; 74 Nick Hennessey T; 62 Richie Incognito G; 67 Andy Levitre G; 69 Jamon Meredith G; 76 Andre Ramsey T; 79 Jonathan Scott T; Defensive linemen (DL): 92 Ryan Denney DE; 93 Chris Ellis DE; 91 Spencer Johnson DT; 90 Chris Kelsay DE; 58 Aaron Maybin DE; 97 John McCargo DT; 94 Aaron Schobel DE; 99 Marcus Stroud DT; 95 Kyle Williams DT	Linebackers (LB): 57 Jon Corto OLB; 52 Chris Draft OLB; 96 Ryan Manalac OLB; 59 Ashlee Palmer OLB; 51 Paul Posluszny MLB; 43 Bryan Scott OLB; 50 Josh Stamer MLB; Defensive backs (DB): 27 Reggie Corner CB; 29 Drayton Florence CB; 47 Cary Harris FS; 25 Ellis Lankster CB; 21 John Wendling SS; 20 Donte Whitner FS; 37 George Wilson SS; 26 Ashton Youboty CB; Special teams (ST): 9 Rian Lindell K; 8 Brian Moorman P; 65 Garrison Sanborn LS	Practice squad: 72 Rashaad Duncan DT; 42 Bruce Hall RB; 98 Lonnie Harvey DT; 18 C. J. Hawthorne WR (IR); 15 Felton Huggins WR; 75 Corey Mace DT; 66 Jason Watkins T; Reserve: 77 Demetress Bell T(IR); 53 Marcus Buggs LB (IR); 60 Brad Butler T (IR); 31 Jairus Byrd S (IR); 56 Keith Ellison LB (IR); 86 Derek Fine TE (IR); -- Justise Hairston RB (IR); 54 Nic Harris LB (IR); 35 Todd Johnson S (IR); 24 Terrence McGee CB (IR); -- Jermaine McGhee DE (IR); 28 Leodis McKelvin CB/KR (IR); 68 Seth McKinney C/G (IR); 55 Kawika Mitchell LB (IR); -- Marvin Philip C (IR); 40 Lydell Sargeant CB (IR); 80 Derek Schouman TE (IR); 71 Kendall Simmons G (IR); -- Marcus Smith DT (IR); 70 Eric Wood G (IR); Rookies in italics 53 active, 21 reserve, 6 practice squad

== Preseason ==
The Bills were selected to play against the Tennessee Titans in the Pro Football Hall of Fame Game on August 9, 2009; the game seeks to celebrate the 50th anniversary of the American Football League. Bills owner Ralph Wilson was among the 2009 inductees to the Hall and is one of the two surviving original AFL owners, the other being Titans owner Bud Adams. Each team wore their AFL throwback uniforms, with the Titans in Houston Oilers uniforms, as the team played in Houston until the early-1990s.

Week	Date	Opponent	Result	Record	Venue	Recap
HOF	August 9	vs. Tennessee Titans	L 18–21	0–1	Fawcett Stadium (Canton)	Recap
1	August 15	Chicago Bears	W 27–20	1–1	Ralph Wilson Stadium	Recap
2	August 22	at Green Bay Packers	L 21–31	1–2	Lambeau Field	Recap
3	August 29	at Pittsburgh Steelers	L 0–17	1–3	Heinz Field	Recap
4	September 3	Detroit Lions	L 6–17	1–4	Ralph Wilson Stadium	Recap

== Regular season ==
The Bills played a 16-game schedule in 2009, in accordance with the NFL scheduling formula. The schedule consisted of six games against their AFC East divisional rivals (two each against the Miami Dolphins, New England Patriots, and New York Jets), four intra-conference games versus the AFC South (one game each against the Houston Texans, Indianapolis Colts, Jacksonville Jaguars, and Tennessee Titans), four inter-conference games against teams from the NFC South (one game each against the Atlanta Falcons, Carolina Panthers, New Orleans Saints, and Tampa Bay Buccaneers), and two games against the remaining two AFC teams that, like Buffalo, finished fourth in their respective divisions in 2008 (one game each versus the Cleveland Browns and Kansas City Chiefs). For the first time, the Bills faced the Buccaneers in Buffalo; in the 33-year history of the Tampa Bay franchise, all previous regular-season games between the two teams were held in Tampa, Florida.

=== Schedule ===
Week	Date	Opponent	Result	Record	Venue	Recap
1	September 14	at **New England Patriots**	**L** 24–25	0–1	Gillette Stadium	Recap
2	September 20	Tampa Bay Buccaneers	**W** 33–20	1–1	Ralph Wilson Stadium	Recap
3	September 27	New Orleans Saints	**L** 7–27	1–2	Ralph Wilson Stadium	Recap
4	October 4	at **Miami Dolphins**	**L** 10–38	1–3	Land Shark Stadium	Recap
5	October 11	Cleveland Browns	**L** 3–6	1–4	Ralph Wilson Stadium	Recap
6	October 18	at **New York Jets**	**W** 16–13 (OT)	2–4	Giants Stadium	Recap
7	October 25	at Carolina Panthers	**W** 20–9	3–4	Bank of America Stadium	Recap
8	November 1	Houston Texans	**L** 10–31	3–5	Ralph Wilson Stadium	Recap
9	Bye					
10	November 15	at Tennessee Titans	**L** 17–41	3–6	LP Field	Recap
11	November 22	at Jacksonville Jaguars	**L** 15–18	3–7	Jacksonville Municipal Stadium	Recap
12	November 29	**Miami Dolphins**	**W** 31–14	4–7	Ralph Wilson Stadium	Recap
13	December 3	**New York Jets**	**L** 13–19	4–8	(Canada) Rogers Centre (Toronto)	Recap
14	December 13	at Kansas City Chiefs	**W** 16–10	5–8	Arrowhead Stadium	Recap
15	December 20	**New England Patriots**	**L** 10–17	5–9	Ralph Wilson Stadium	Recap
16	December 27	at Atlanta Falcons	**L** 3–31	5–10	Georgia Dome	Recap
17	January 3	Indianapolis Colts	**W** 30–7	6–10	Ralph Wilson Stadium	Recap

Note: Intra-division opponents are in bold text.

== Standings ==
AFC East
	W	L	T	PCT	DIV	CONF	PF	PA	STK
^{(3)} New England Patriots	10	6	0	.625	4–2	7–5	427	285	L1
^{(5)} New York Jets	9	7	0	.563	2–4	7–5	348	236	W2
Miami Dolphins	7	9	0	.438	4–2	5–7	360	390	L3
Buffalo Bills	6	10	0	.375	2–4	4–8	258	326	W1

== Regular season ==
=== Week 1 ===
Team	1	2	3	4	Total
Bills	7	7	3	7	24
• Patriots	0	10	0	15	25

- Date: September 14
- Location: Gillette Stadium • Foxborough, Massachusetts
- Game start: 7:00 p.m. EST
- Game attendance: 68,756
- Game weather: 70 °F (21 °C) (Clear)
- Referee: Scott Green
- TV announcers (ESPN): Mike Tirico, Ron Jaworski, Jon Gruden & Suzy Kolber

The Bills began their season at Gillette Stadium for an AFL Legacy duel with their AFC East rival, the New England Patriots, in the first game of a MNF doubleheader. Buffalo got off to a fast start in the first quarter as quarterback Trent Edwards completed an 11-yard touchdown pass to rookie tight end Shawn Nelson. The Patriots would respond in the second quarter as running back Fred Taylor got a 1-yard touchdown run, yet Buffalo came right back as defensive end Aaron Schobel returned an interception 26 yards for a touchdown. New England would close out the half with kicker Stephen Gostkowski getting a 20-yard field goal.

In the third quarter, the Bills would add to their lead as kicker Rian Lindell made a 40-yard field goal. In the fourth quarter, the Patriots replied with Gostkowski nailing a 28-yard field goal. Buffalo would increase their lead as Edwards completed a 10-yard touchdown pass to running back Fred Jackson. With just over 5 minutes to play, The Patriots would strike back as quarterback Tom Brady completed an 18-yard touchdown pass to tight end Benjamin Watson (with a failed two-point conversion). On the ensuing kickoff, cornerback Leodis McKelvin got the kickoff from his own endzone and got as far as the Bills 31-yard line, where he was stripped of the ball and New England's Gostkowski recovered. This would eventually set up Brady's 16-yard touchdown pass to Watson (with another failed two-point conversion). With under a minute to play Buffalo tried to respond, but the Patriots' defense was too much to overcome.

With the bitter loss, the Bills began their season at 0–1.

=== Week 2 ===
Team	1	2	3	4	Total
Buccaneers	0	14	0	6	20
• Bills	17	3	0	13	33

- Date: September 20
- Location: Ralph Wilson Stadium • Orchard Park, New York
- Game start: 4:05 p.m. EST
- Game attendance: 70,318
- Game weather: 74 °F (23 °C) (Sunny)
- Referee: Ron Winter
- TV announcers (Fox): Kenny Albert, Daryl Johnston & Tony Siragusa

Hoping to rebound from a tough loss to the Patriots, the Bills would play their Week 2 home opener in an interconference duel with the Tampa Bay Buccaneers. This would be the first time that Buffalo ever hosted Tampa Bay in a regular season game, having played a preseason game with each other in 1977. In the first quarter, the Bills came out firing as quarterback Trent Edwards completed a 32-yard touchdown pass to wide receiver Lee Evans, safety Donte Whitner returning an interception 76 yards for a touchdown and kicker Rian Lindell making a 31-yard field goal. The Buccaneers would get on the board in the second quarter as quarterback Byron Leftwich completed a 42-yard touchdown pass to tight end Kellen Winslow, while Buffalo replied with Lindell getting a 43-yard field goal. Tampa Bay would close out the half as Leftwich completed an 8-yard touchdown pass to running back Carnell "Cadillac" Williams. After a scoreless third quarter, the Bills began to pull away as Lindell got a 43-yard field goal and Edwards completed a 43-yard touchdown pass to wide receiver Terrell Owens. The Buccaneers tried to rally as Leftwich completed a 6-yard touchdown pass to tight end Jerramy Stevens (with a failed two-point conversion), yet Buffalo closed out the game with Lindell nailing a 20-yard field goal. With the win, the Bills improved to 1–1.

=== Week 3 ===
Team	1	2	3	4	Total
• Saints	7	3	0	17	27
Bills	0	7	0	0	7

- Date: September 27
- Location: Ralph Wilson Stadium • Orchard Park, New York
- Game start: 4:05 p.m. EST
- Game attendance: 70,261
- Game weather: 64 °F (18 °C) (Cloudy)
- Referee: Walt Anderson
- TV announcers (Fox): Ron Pitts & John Lynch

Coming off their win the Buccaneers, the Bills stayed at home for a Week 3 interconference duel with the New Orleans Saints. Buffalo would trail early as Saints running back Lynell Hamilton got a 1-yard touchdown run. The Bills would answer in the second quarter on a fake field goal attempt, punter Brian Moorman threw a 25-yard touchdown pass to defensive end Ryan Denney. New Orleans would close out the half with kicker John Carney's 27-yard field goal. After a scoreless third quarter, the Saints took control in the fourth quarter with running back Pierre Thomas' 34-yard touchdown run, Carney's 35-yard field goal and Thomas' 19-yard touchdown run. With the loss, Buffalo fell to 1–2.

=== Week 4 ===
Team	1	2	3	4	Total
Bills	0	3	0	7	10
• Dolphins	0	17	14	7	38

- Date: October 4
- Location: Land Shark Stadium • Miami Gardens, Florida
- Game start: 4:05 p.m. EST
- Game attendance: 65,523
- Game weather: 88 °F (31 °C) (Sunny)
- Referee: Carl Cheffers
- TV announcers (CBS): Kevin Harlan & Solomon Wilcots

Hoping to rebound from their home loss to the Saints, the Bills flew to Land Shark Stadium for a Week 4 AFC East duel with the Miami Dolphins. After a scoreless first quarter, Buffalo would find themselves trailing in the second as Dolphins kicker Dan Carpenter got a 33-yard field goal, followed by cornerback Vontae Davis returning an interception 23 yards for a touchdown. The Bills would get on the board with a 35-yard field goal from kicker Rian Lindell, but Miami would answer with running back Ronnie Brown's 1-yard touchdown run.

The Dolphins' domination continued into the third quarter with quarterback Chad Henne completing a 5-yard touchdown pass to wide receiver Brian Hartline, followed by a 1-yard touchdown run by running back Ricky Williams. Buffalo tried to salvage the game in the fourth quarter with quarterback Trent Edwards completing a 3-yard touchdown pass to wide receiver Josh Reed, but Miami would close out the game with Brown's 4-yard touchdown pass.

With the loss, the Bills fell to 1–3.

=== Week 5 ===
Team	1	2	3	4	Total
• Browns	0	3	0	3	6
Bills	0	0	3	0	3

- Date: October 11
- Location: Ralph Wilson Stadium • Orchard Park, New York
- Game start: 1:00 p.m. EST
- Game attendance: 70,526
- Game weather: 47 °F (8 °C) (Mostly Sunny)
- Referee: Jerome Boger
- TV announcers (CBS): Don Criqui & Randy Cross

The Bills, hoping to shake off a loss to the winless Miami Dolphins on the road the week before, faced the 0–4 Cleveland Browns at Ralph Wilson Stadium. The wind played a factor throughout the game, making it difficult for both teams to sustain drives in the air. The Browns and Bills traded punts in the first quarter until the Bills had a drive end at their own 47 after turning it over on downs. This stop led to the only points of the first half by the Browns, a 24-yard field goal by backup kicker Billy Cundiff. Cundiff was the starter at kicker for the Browns due to the injury to their regular kicker Phil Dawson.

In the second half, the longest drive by the Bills in the game was in their opening possession, which led to a successful 36-yard field goal by Bills kicker Rian Lindell to tie the game at 3. Later in the third quarter, each quarterback threw an interception, first Trent Edwards of the Bills to cornerback Eric Wright of the Browns, and then Derek Anderson of the Browns to Bills' safety Jairus Byrd. Deadlocked at 3 apiece going into the fourth quarter, both offenses continued to be stifled. However, a special teams blunder by Bills punt returner Roscoe Parrish allowed the Browns to set up at the Buffalo 16-yard line after Parrish muffed the punt. From this turnover, the Browns were able to win the game on an 18-yard field goal by Cundiff with 23 seconds left to play. This loss dropped the Bills' record to 1–4, with the division rival New York Jets next up on the schedule in the Meadowlands. The Browns improved their record to 1–4. During the game, the Bills lost two defensive starters to injury who were carted off the field- linebacker Kawika Mitchell and linebacker Marcus Buggs.

In this loss, the Bills earned the dubious distinction of losing to a quarterback with the worst completion percentage in NFL history in a win (minimum of 10 attempts), the Browns Derek Anderson, who completed just 2 out of 17 passes for just 23 yards- a percentage of 11.7%. Joe Ferguson (Buffalo) won a game on September 29, 1974, against the New York Jets while completing neither of his two pass attempts in the last NFL game won by a team without a pass completion. Tim Graham of The Athletic, writing in 2022, called this game the "worst NFL game" in the last 20 years.

=== Week 6 ===
Team	1	2	3	4	OT	Total
• Bills	3	0	10	0	3	16
Jets	3	10	0	0	0	13

- Date: October 18
- Location: Giants Stadium • East Rutherford, New Jersey
- Game start: 4:15 p.m. EST
- Game attendance: 76,048
- Game weather: 44 °F (7 °C) (Cloudy)
- Referee: Walt Coleman
- TV announcers (CBS): Dick Enberg & Dan Fouts

Trying to snap a three-game losing streak, the Bills flew to The Meadowlands for a Week 6 AFC East duel with the New York Jets. In the first quarter, Buffalo got the initial strike as kicker Rian Lindell got a 33-yard field goal. The Jets would answer with a 23-yard field goal from kicker Jay Feely. New York would take the lead in the second quarter Feely's 41-yard field goal and running back Thomas Jones' 71-yard touchdown run.

In the third quarter, the Bills fought back as Lindell nailed a 25-yard field goal, followed by quarterback Ryan Fitzpatrick completing a 37-yard touchdown pass to wide receiver Lee Evans. Both teams would fight hard throughout the fourth quarter and eventually, Lindell got a chance to kick a last-second field goal. However, his 46-yard attempt went wide right, sending the game into overtime. In overtime, both teams would slug it out with each other throughout most of the quarter. In the end, Buffalo emerged victorious as Lindell booted the game-winning 47-yard field goal.

With the win, not only did the Bills improve to 2–4, but the defense managed to record five interceptions (two for rookie safety Jairus Byrd, one for safety George Wilson, one for cornerback Reggie Corner, and one for linebacker Paul Posluszny).

Starting quarterback Trent Edwards (5/5 for 43 yards) left the game in the second quarter with a concussion.

=== Week 7 ===
Team	1	2	3	4	Total
• Bills	7	0	0	13	20
Panthers	0	2	0	7	9

- Date: October 25
- Location: Bank of America Stadium • Charlotte, North Carolina
- Game start: 4:05 p.m. EST
- Game attendance: 73,497
- Game weather: 67 °F (19 °C) (Mostly Cloudy)
- Referee: Terry McAulay
- TV announcers (CBS): Gus Johnson & Steve Tasker

Coming off their thrilling overtime road win over the Jets, the Bills flew to Bank of America Stadium for a Week 7 interconference duel with the Carolina Panthers. With quarterback Trent Edwards recovering from a concussion, quarterback Ryan Fitzpatrick was given the start.

Buffalo delivered the opening charge in the first quarter with a 7-yard touchdown run from running back Marshawn Lynch. In the second quarter, the Panthers got on the board as defensive tackle Hollis Thomas tackled running back Fred Jackson in his own endzone for a safety.

After a scoreless third quarter, the Bills increased their lead in the fourth quarter with Fitzpatrick completing a 2-yard touchdown pass to wide receiver Lee Evans, followed by a 29-yard field goal from kicker Rian Lindell. Carolina tried to rally as running back DeAngelo Williams got a 15-yard touchdown run, yet Buffalo pulled away with Lindell's 22-yard field goal.

With the win, the Bills improved to 3–4.

=== Week 8 ===
Team	1	2	3	4	Total
• Texans	0	6	3	22	31
Bills	7	3	0	0	10

- Date: November 1
- Location: Ralph Wilson Stadium • Orchard Park, New York
- Game start: 1:00 p.m. EST
- Game attendance: 69,790
- Game weather: 49 °F (9 °C) (Partly Cloudy)
- Referee: Gene Steratore
- TV announcers (CBS): Ian Eagle & Rich Gannon

Coming off their road win over the Panthers, the Bills went home for a Week 8 duel with the Houston Texans. In the first quarter, Buffalo struck first as wide receiver Terrell Owens got a 29-yard touchdown run. The Texans would answer in the second quarter with a 42-yard and a 22-yard field goal from kicker Kris Brown. The Bills would end the half with kicker Rian Lindell's 21-yard field goal.

Houston would creep closer in the third quarter with Brown booting a 26-yard field goal. In the fourth quarter, the Texans would take the lead and never look back as running back Ryan Moats got three touchdown runs of 11 yards (followed by quarterback Matt Schaub's 2-point conversion pass to wide receiver Andre Johnson), 1 yard, and 3 yards.

With the loss, Buffalo went into their bye week at 3–5.

Despite the loss, rookie safety Jairus Byrd once again had two interceptions. He would become the first rookie and only the second player in NFL history to have three-straight multi-interception games.

=== Week 10 ===
Team	1	2	3	4	Total
Bills	7	7	3	0	17
• Titans	14	3	0	24	41

- Date: November 15
- Location: LP Field • Nashville, Tennessee
- Game start: 1:00 p.m. EST
- Game attendance: 69,143
- Game weather: 68 °F (20 °C) (Sunny)
- Referee: John Parry
- TV announcers (CBS): Ian Eagle & Rich Gannon

Coming off their bye week, the Bills flew to LP Field, donned their throwbacks, and played a Week 10 AFL Legacy game with the Tennessee Titans. In the first quarter, Buffalo struck first with a trick play as running back Fred Jackson completed a 27-yard touchdown pass to wide receiver Lee Evans. The Titans would answer with a 28-yard touchdown run from running back Chris Johnson and quarterback Vince Young's 14-yard touchdown pass to wide receiver Nate Washington. Tennessee would add onto their lead in the second quarter with a 38-yard field goal from kicker Rob Bironas. The Bills would close out the half with quarterback Trent Edwards' 8-yard touchdown pass to Evans. Buffalo would tie the game in the third quarter with kicker Rian Lindell nailing a 25-yard field goal, but the Titans would pull away in the fourth quarter with Johnson's 1-yard touchdown run, Bironas' 51-yard field goal, safety Vincent Fuller returning an interception 26 yards for a touchdown and cornerback Rod Hood returning an interception 31 yards for a touchdown. With the loss, not only did the Bills fall to 3–6, but head coach Dick Jauron would get fired two days later.

=== Week 11 ===
Team	1	2	3	4	Total
Bills	6	3	6	0	15
• Jaguars	3	7	0	8	18

- Date: November 22
- Location: Jacksonville Municipal Stadium • Jacksonville, Florida
- Game start: 1:00 p.m. EST
- Game attendance: 47,757
- Game weather: 74 °F (23 °C) (Light Rain)
- Referee: Mike Carey
- TV announcers (CBS): Bill Macatee & Steve Beuerlein

Hoping to rebound from their loss to the Titans, the Bills flew to Jacksonville Municipal Stadium for an intraconference duel with the Jacksonville Jaguars. In the 1st quarter Buffalo trailed early as kicker Josh Scobee made a 29-yard field goal. Then the Bills came on top with kicker Rian Lindell hitting a 26 and a 28-yard field goal. The Bills fell behind in the 2nd quarter when RB Maurice Jones-Drew got a 3-yard touchdown run. Then the Bills would score to end the half with Lindell nailing a 22-yard field goal. In the third quarter Buffalo took the lead with QB Ryan Fitzpatrick making a 98-yard touchdown pass to WR Terrell Owens (with a failed 2-point conversion attempt). In the fourth quarter Buffalo fell behind again with QB David Garrard making a 3-yard touchdown pass to WR Mike Sims-Walker (With a successful QB sneak to make the two-point conversion). With the loss, the Bills fell to 3–7 in Perry Fewell's first game as interim head coach.

=== Week 12 ===
Team	1	2	3	4	Total
Dolphins	0	7	7	0	14
• Bills	0	7	0	24	31

- Date: November 29
- Location: Ralph Wilson Stadium • Orchard Park, New York
- Game start: 1:00 p.m. EST
- Game attendance: 70,155
- Game weather: 49 °F (9 °C) (Sunny)
- Referee: Jeff Triplette
- TV announcers (CBS): Gus Johnson & Steve Tasker

Trying to snap a three-game losing streak, the Bills went home, donned their throwback uniforms (again), and played a Week 12 AFC East rematch with the Miami Dolphins. After a scoreless first quarter, Buffalo would trail early in the second quarter as Dolphins quarterback Chad Henne threw a 4-yard touchdown pass to wide receiver Brian Hartline. The Bills would tie the game with quarterback Ryan Fitzpatrick getting an impressive 31-yard touchdown run.

Miami would retake the lead in the third quarter with a 1-yard touchdown run from running back Ricky Williams, yet Buffalo's offense would explode with points in the fourth quarter. It would begin with running back Fred Jackson's 3-yard touchdown run and continued with kicker Rian Lindell booting a 56-yard field goal. Afterwards, Fitzpatrick would hook up with wide receiver Terrell Owens on a 51-yard touchdown pass, while Jackson got a 7-yard touchdown run.

With the win, the Bills improved to 4–7.

=== Week 13 ===
Team	1	2	3	4	Total
• Jets	3	13	0	3	19
Bills	3	7	0	3	13

- Date: December 3
- Location: Rogers Centre • Toronto, Ontario
- Game start: 8:20 p.m. EST
- Game attendance: 51,567
- Game weather: Indoors (Roof Closed)
- Referee: Scott Green
- TV announcers (NFL Network): Bob Papa & Matt Millen

In their second-ever regular season game north of the border, Buffalo traveled to Toronto to take on divisional rivals the New York Jets. The team traded field goals in the first quarter before the Bills took a 10–6 lead after a 15-yard touchdown run from Marshawn Lynch. The Jets regained the lead after quarterback Mark Sanchez threw a 13-yard touchdown pass to Braylon Edwards. The teams went scoreless in the third quarter that was notable for Sanchez suffering a sprained Posterior cruciate ligament to his right knee. The team again traded field goals in the final quarter. Buffalo had a chance to take the lead or at least tie in the final two minutes, but quarterback Ryan Fitzpatrick threw an interception to Darrelle Revis, sealing the victory for the Jets. With the loss, Buffalo fell to 4–8 overall and 1–2 since firing Jauron.

=== Week 14 ===
Team	1	2	3	4	Total
• Bills	7	3	3	3	16
Chiefs	0	3	7	0	10

- Date: December 13
- Location: Arrowhead Stadium • Kansas City, Missouri
- Game start: 1:00 p.m. EST
- Game attendance: 68,668
- Game weather: 42 °F (6 °C) (Mostly Cloudy)
- Referee: Alberto Riveron
- TV announcers (CBS): Bill Macatee & Steve Beuerlein

=== Week 15 ===
Team	1	2	3	4	Total
• Patriots	0	14	3	0	17
Bills	3	0	0	7	10

- Date: December 20
- Location: Ralph Wilson Stadium • Orchard Park, New York
- Game start: 1:00 p.m. EST
- Game attendance: 70,000
- Game weather: 28 °F (−2 °C) (Cloudy)
- Referee: Tony Corrente
- TV announcers (CBS): Greg Gumbel & Dan Dierdorf

=== Week 16 ===
Team	1	2	3	4	Total
Bills	0	0	3	0	3
• Falcons	7	3	14	7	31

- Date: December 27
- Location: Georgia Dome • Atlanta, Georgia
- Game start: 1:00 p.m. EST
- Game attendance: 68,887
- Game weather: Indoors (Dome)
- Referee: Bill Leavy
- TV announcers (CBS): Bill Macatee & Steve Beuerlein

=== Week 17 ===
Team	1	2	3	4	Total
Colts	7	0	0	0	7
• Bills	7	17	6	0	30

- Date: January 3
- Location: Ralph Wilson Stadium • Orchard Park, New York
- Game start: 1:00 p.m. EST
- Game attendance: 69,848
- Game weather: 12 °F (−11 °C) (Snow)
- Referee: Don Carey
- TV announcers (CBS): Bill Macatee & Steve Beuerlein

Scoring summary
1	9:25	BUF	Fred Jackson 11-yard pass from Ryan Fitzpatrick (Rian Lindell kick)	Bills 7–0
1	3:52	IND	Mike Hart 1-yard run (Matt Stover kick)	Tie 7–7
2	5:02	BUF	Lee Evans 21-yard pass from Ryan Fitzpatrick (Rian Lindell kick)	Bills 14–7
2	2:28	BUF	Terrell Owens 41-yard pass from Ryan Fitzpatrick (Rian Lindell kick)	Bills 21–7
2	:14	BUF	Rian Lindell 31-yard field goal	Bills 24–7
3	7:32	BUF	Rian Lindell 33-yard field goal	Bills 27–7
3	:14	BUF	Rian Lindell 36-yard field goal	Bills 30–7

Buffalo won its season finale for the first time since 2002.
