= Jairus Byrd =

American football player (born 1986)

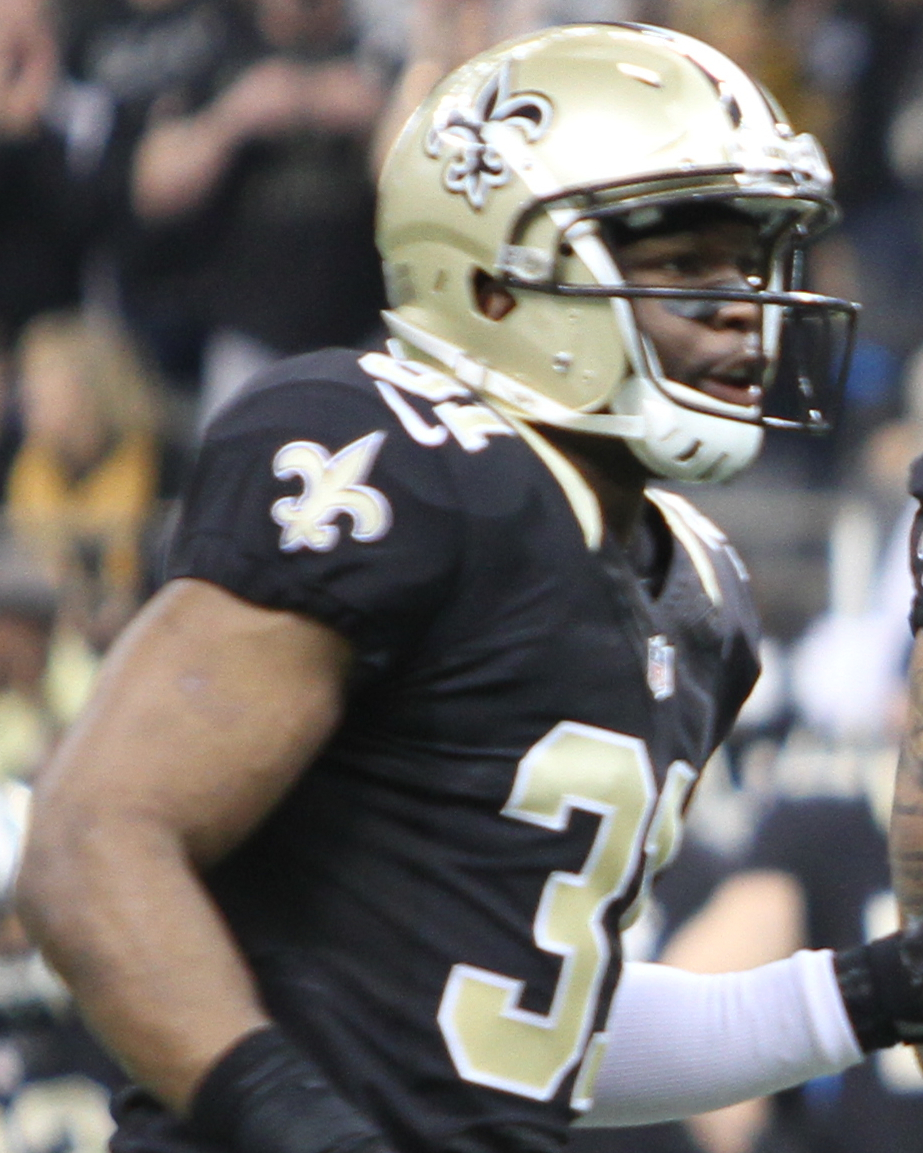
- Byrd with the New Orleans Saints in 2015

No. 31
- Position: Safety

Personal information
- Born: October 7, 1986 (age 40); San Diego, California, U.S.
- Listed height: 5 ft 10 in (1.78 m)
- Listed weight: 203 lb (92 kg)

Career information
- High school: Clayton (Clayton, Missouri)
- College: Oregon (2005–2008)
- NFL draft: 2009: 2nd round, 42nd overall pick

Career history
- Buffalo Bills (2009−2013); New Orleans Saints (2014–2016); Carolina Panthers (2017)

Awards and highlights
- 2× Second-team All-Pro (2012, 2013); 3× Pro Bowl (2009, 2012, 2013); NFL interceptions co-leader (2009); PFWA All-Rookie Team (2009); Pac-10 Co-Freshman of the Year (2006); First-team All-Pac-10 (2008)

Career NFL statistics
- Total tackles: 524
- Sacks: 4
- Forced fumbles: 13
- Fumble recoveries: 6
- Interceptions: 25
- Defensive touchdowns: 2
- Stats at Pro Football Reference

Jairus Keelon Byrd (born October 7, 1986) is an American former professional football player who was a safety in the National Football League (NFL). He played college football for the Oregon Ducks. He was selected by the Buffalo Bills in the second round of the 2009 NFL draft. He is a three-time Pro Bowl selection.

== Early life ==
Byrd attended Clayton High School in St. Louis County, Missouri. He played quarterback, wide receiver, safety and special teams. As a senior, he was the Missouri 4A offensive player of the year and played a large role in leading the school to the 2004 state championship. As a senior, he rushed for 1,480 yards with 26 touchdowns, passed for 1,038 yards with 13 touchdowns, and made six receptions for 125 yards on offense. On defense, he had 71 tackles, seven interceptions, three quarterback sacks and two fumble recoveries. He also had 10 kickoff returns, 15 punt returns, and 18 punts. He also lettered in baseball, basketball and track.

== College career ==
Byrd enrolled in the University of Oregon, where he played for the Oregon Ducks football team. As a freshman in 2005, Byrd was red-shirted. In 2006 Byrd was a freshman All-American second-team selection by The Sporting News and was the Pac-10 co-freshman player of the year (alongside Taylor Mays and Alterraun Verner). He started the last 11 games at cornerback, recording 56 tackles and five interceptions.

As a sophomore in 2007 Byrd was an All-Pac-10 conference honorable mention. He started all 13 games for the Ducks, recording 64 tackles, a sack, and a conference leading seven interceptions. As a junior in 2008 he was an all-Pac 10 first-team selection and was the defensive MVP of the 2008 Holiday Bowl. He started 13 games and finished with 83 tackles and five interceptions.

Byrd finished his college career starting 37 of 39 games, with 203 tackles, 17 interceptions, a sack, two forced fumbles and four fumble recoveries.

After the season Byrd announced that he would forgo his senior season and enter the 2009 NFL draft.

== Professional career ==
Pre-draft measurables
Height	Weight	Arm length	Hand span	40-yard dash	10-yard split	20-yard split	20-yard shuttle	Three-cone drill	Vertical jump	Bench press	Wonderlic
5 ft 10 1/8 in (1.78 m)	207 lb (94 kg)	32 5/8 in (0.83 m)	10 1/8 in (0.26 m)	4.68 s	1.53 s	2.68 s	4.10 s	6.75 s	35.0 in (0.89 m)	15 reps	15
All values from NFL Combine/Oregon Pro Day

=== Buffalo Bills ===
==== 2009 ====
The Buffalo Bills selected Byrd in the second round (42nd overall) of the 2009 NFL draft. He was the third safety drafted in 2009, following and Louis Delmas (33rd overall) and Oregon teammate Patrick Chung (34th overall).

On July 29, 2009, the Bills signed Byrd to a four–year, $4.15 million contract that includes $2.47 million guaranteed. The Bills planned to have Byrd immediately compete against Bryan Scott for the role as the starting free safety. Unfortunately, Byrd underwent sports hernia surgery at the beginning of the summer and was placed on the NFI list.

He missed the first 18 days of training camp, the first two preseason games, and was unable to attend spring mini camp due to Oregon's late exam schedule. Upon his return, Byrd competed against Ko Simpson and George Wilson to be the primary backup safety. Head coach Dick Jauron named him a backup and listed him as the No. 2 free safety on the depth chart, behind starting safeties Donte Whitner and Bryan Scott.

On September 14, 2009, Byrd made his professional regular season debut in the Buffalo Bills' season-opener at the New England Patriots and recorded three solo tackles as they lost 24–25. In Week 3, Byrd earned his first career start as a nickelback and recorded five combined tackles (three solo) during a 7–27 loss at the New Orleans Saints. During the game, both starting safeties would suffer injuries with Donte Whitner injuring his thumb and Bryan Scott suffering a high ankle sprain. On October 11, 2009, Byrd set a season-high with seven combined tackles (four solo), made a pass deflection, and had his first career interception on a pass by Derek Anderson to wide receiver Mohamed Massaquoi during a 3–6 loss to the Cleveland Browns. The following week, he made three combined tackles (two solo), set a season-high with three pass deflections, and had his first multi-interception game by picking off two pass attempts by Mark Sanchez during a 16–13 overtime victory at the New York Jets in 6.

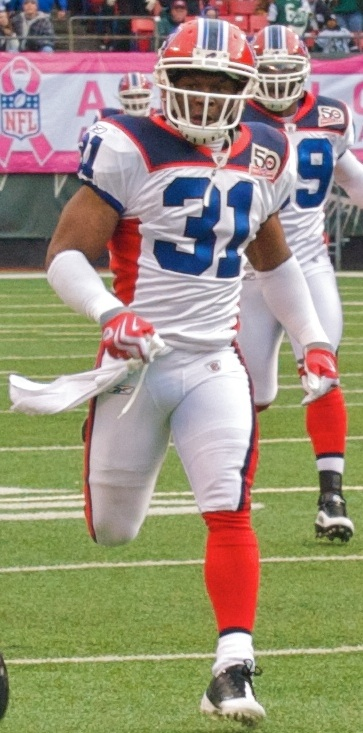
Byrd playing for the Bills in 2009.

In Week 7, he recorded two solo tackles, had two pass break-ups, and intercepted two passes thrown by Jake Delhomme during a 20–9 victory at the Carolina Panthers. For his performance in October, he earned the NFL Defensive Rookie of the Month. On November 1, 2009, Byrd made five combined tackles (two solo), two pass deflections, and had his third consecutive game with two interceptions on pass attempts by Matt Schaub as the Bills lost 31–10 to the Houston Texans. This tied an NFL record held by Dave Baker for consecutive games with two or more interceptions with three. On November 17, 2009, the Bills fired head coach Dick Jauron after falling to a 3–6 record and appointed defensive coordinator Perry Fewell to interim head coach for the remainder of the season. In Week 10, Byrd recorded two combined tackles (one solo), made one pass break-up, and intercepted a pass by Vince Young to wide receiver Lavelle Hawkins during a 17–41 loss at the Tennessee Titans. This was his fifth straight game with an interception, setting the team record for consecutive games with an interception. In Week 14, Byrd recorded four combined tackles (three solo), made a pass deflection, and sealed a 16-10 victory at the Kansas City Chiefs by intercepting a pass by Matt Cassel to wide receiver Chris Chambers with only 2:20 remaining in the game. This set his career-high with nine interceptions in a season. In Week 15, Byrd aggravated his groin injury as the Bills lost 17–10 to the New England Patriots. On December 23, 2009, the Bills officially placed Byrd on season ending injured reserve for the last two games (Weeks 16–17) of the season due to a torn labrum related to his sports hernia surgery. He underwent surgery on his torn labrum and was expected to have a recovery window of four months. He finished his rookie season in 2009 with a total of 45 combined tackles (33 solo), 11 pass deflections, and set a career-high with nine interceptions in 14 games and 11 starts. His nine interceptions tied for the league league in 2009, along with Asante Samuel, Charles Woodson, and Darren Sharper. For his play, he was selected to play in the Pro Bowl, becoming the first Bills rookie selected since Greg Bell in 1984.

==== 2010 ====
On January 19, 2010, the Buffalo Bills announced Chan Gailey as their new head coach. Throughout training camp, he competed against George Wilson to be the starting free safety under defensive coordinator George Edwards. Head coach Chan Gailey named Byrd a backup and listed him as the No. 2 free safety to begin the season, behind starters Donte Whitner and George Wilson.

On November 28, 2010, he set a season-high with 11 combined tackles (seven solo), forced a fumble, and had a fumble recovery during a 16–19 overtime loss against the Pittsburgh Steelers. In Week 15, Byrd recorded four solo tackles and had his first career sack on Chad Henne for a three–yard loss during a 17–14 win at the Miami Dolphins. On January 2, 2011, Byrd recorded six combined tackles (four solo), made one pass deflection, and had his first career pick-six after he intercepted a pass Mark Brunell threw to running back Joe McKnight and returned it 37–yards to score his first career touchdown during a 7–38 loss at the New York Jets. He finished with 89 combined tackles (62 solo), three forced fumbles, two pass deflections, one sack, a fumble recovery, one interception, and a touchdown in 16 games and 14 starts.

==== 2011 ====
He entered to training camp slated as the de facto starting free safety. Following the departure of Donte Whitner in free agency, head coach Chan Gailey paired Byrd with George Wilson and named them the starting safeties to begin the season.

On September 25, 2011, he set a season-high with 12 combined tackles (eight solo) and made two pass deflections as the Bills defeated the New England Patriots 31–34. In Week 8, Byrd made four combined tackles (three solo), one pass deflection, set a season-high with one sack, and intercepted a pass by John Beck to wide receiver Donte Stallworth as the Bills routed the Washington Redskins 23–0. On December 24, 2011, Byrd recorded seven combined tackles (five solo), made a pass deflection, and intercepted a pass by Tim Tebow to wide receiver Eric Decker and returned it for a 37–yard touchdown during a 40–14 win against the Denver Broncos. He started in all 16 games throughout the 2011 NFL season and finished with a total of 98 combined tackles (75 solo), eight pass deflections, three interceptions, one sack, and a touchdown.

==== 2012 ====
On January 2, 2012, the Buffalo Bills announced their decision to promote linebackers coach Dave Wannstedt to defensive coordinator after the fired Chan Gailey following a 6–10 record in 2011. Head coach Chan Gailey retained Byrd and George Wilson as the starting safeties to begin the season.

On September 16, 2012, Byrd made seven combined tackles (four solo), a pass break-up, and sealed the 35–17 victory over the Kansas City Chiefs by intercepting a pass by Matt Cassel to wide receiver Steve Breaston with five seconds remaining. In Week 4, he set a season-high with nine combined tackles (four solo), made two forced fumbles, and had a fumble recovery as the Bills lost 28–52 against the New England Patriots. On October 14, 2012, Byrd made four solo tackles, a pass deflection, and set a season-high with two interceptions during a 19–16 overtime victory at the Arizona Cardinals. He led the Bills to victory by intercepting a pass thrown by John Skelton to tight end Rob Housler and returned it 29–yards before he was tackled by wide receiver Michael Floyd. With the game tied 16–16 in overtime, the Bills would run one play to better position the ball and immediately sent in Rian Lindell to successfully kick the 25–yard game-winning chip-shot field goal to end the game in overtime 19–16. In Week 11, Byrd made four combined tackles (two solo), two pass break-up, recovered a fumble, and helped secure the Bills' 19–14 victory by intercepting a pass by Ryan Tannehill to wide receiver Davone Bess with exactly two minutes remaining in the fourth quarter. On December 2, 2012, he recorded one solo tackle, had one pass deflection, and sealed a 18–34 win against the Jacksonville Jaguars by intercepting a pass by Chad Henne to wide receiver Kevin Elliott with 38 seconds remaining. He started in all 16 games throughout the season and recorded 73 combined tackles (55 solo), made six pass deflections, five interceptions, four forced fumbles, and made two fumble recoveries.

==== 2013 ====
On March 1, 2013, the Buffalo Bills opted to place their franchise tag on Byrd in order for him to not enter free agency. He refused to sign his tender and held out, seeking for a long-term contract offer from the Bills. On August 20, 2013, the Buffalo Bills signed Byrd to a fully-guaranteed one–year, $6.91 million franchise tender. Despite signing the tender, it was reported that Byrd had requested a trade and was attempting to have his agent orchestrate a trade. He denied the rumors and trade accusations and stated his sole focus was on his recovery from plantar fasciitis. He remained inactive for the first five games (Weeks 1–5) of the season. In his absence, the Bills' new head coach, Doug Marrone, named Da'Norris Searcy and Aaron Williams the starting safeties to begin the season.

On November 17, 2013, Byrd made four combined tackles (two solo), two pass deflections, one sack, and set a season-high with two interceptions on passes by Geno Smith during a 37–14 victory against the New York Jets. In Week 13, he set a season-high with nine combined tackles (six solo) during a 31–34 loss at the Atlanta Falcons. He finished the season with a total of 38 combined tackles (27 solo,), six pass deflections, four interceptions, and one sack in 11 games and nine starts. His tenure with the Bills ended they failed to reach an agreement on a long-term deal following the 2013 season.

=== New Orleans Saints ===
==== 2014 ====
On March 11, 2014, the New Orleans Saints signed Byrd to a six–year, $54.00 million contract that included $26.30 million guaranteed, $12.30 million guaranteed upon signing, and an initial signing bonus of $11.00 million.

He entered training camp slated as the de facto starting strong free following the departures of Malcolm Jenkins and Roman Harper. Head coach Sean Payton named Byrd the starting free safety to begin the season and paired him with Kenny Vaccaro. On September 7, 2014, Byrd made his debut as a member of the New Orleans Saints in their season-opener at the Atlanta Falcons and recorded five solo tackles as they lost in overtime 34–37. In Week 4, he set a season-high with seven combined tackles (six solo) and had one pass deflection during a 17–38 loss at the Dallas Cowboys. On October 2, 2014, Byrd suffered a bucket-handle lateral meniscus tear to his right knee during practice. On October 3, 2014, Saints' head coach Sean Payton announced that it had been confirmed that Byrd had torn his meniscus and subsequently placed him on injured reserve for the remaining 13 games of the season (Weeks 5–17). He finished the 2014 NFL season with only 22 combined tackles (17 solo) in four games and four starts. On November 16, 2015, the Saints fired defensive coordinator Rob Ryan and appointed assistant coach Dennis Allen to be their defensive coordinator.

==== 2015 ====
He returned in the spring and participated in OTAs and spring minicamp, but was sidelined before training camp started due to what Byrd described as an "unspecified" injury. ESPN NFL Insider Ed Werder reported that he began experiencing swelling in his knee. The Saints did not draft or sign legitimate starting safeties during the off-season and chose to have Rafael Bush return as his replacement. In Week 1, Rafael Bush tore his pectoral muscle during a 19-31 loss at the Arizona Cardinals and was placed on injured reserve for the rest of the season.

He returned in Week 4, but was limited to appearing as a backup behind Kenny Phillips. On October 11, 2015, Byrd made his first start of the season and recorded three combined tackles (two solo) and made one pass break-up during a 17–39 loss at the Philadelphia Eagles. On November 8, 2015, he set a season-high with ten combined tackles (seven solo) during a 28–34 overtime loss at the Tennessee Titans. On November 29, 2015, Byrd made eight combined tackles (five solo), one pass deflection, and made his sole interception of the season on a pass thrown by Brian Hoyer to wide receiver Cecil Shorts during a 6–24 loss at the Houston Texans. He finished the 2015 NFL season with a total of 53 combined tackles (37 solo), three pass deflections, one sack, and one interception in 13 games and 13 starts.

==== 2016 ====
During training camp, Byrd competed to retain his role as the starting free safety against rookie second-round pick Vonn Bell. Head coach Sean Payton named him the starting free safety to begin the season, alongside starting strong safety Kenny Vaccaro.

In Week 3, Byrd recorded six combined tackles (four solo), but was responsible for giving up crucial plays due to an inability tackle. The Saints went on to lose 32–45 against the Atlanta Falcons. Head coach Sean Payton subsequently benched him in favor of rookie Vonn Bell as the Saints won 34–35 at the San Diego Chargers. Beginning in Week 5, defensive coordinator Dennis Allen had Byrd appearing in three-safety sets. In Week 6, Byrd began appearing in three-safety sets full-time and fully transitioned into his new position alongside Vonn Bell and Kenny Vaccaro. On October 30, 2016, he set a season-high with ten combined tackles (eight solo) as the Saints defeated the Seattle Seahawks 25–20. On December 24, 2016, Byrd made six combined tackles (three solo), two pass deflections, and set a season-high with two interceptions during a 31–24 victory against the Tampa Bay Buccaneers. He helped secure the victory by intercepting a pass by Jameis Winston to wide receiver Russell Shepard with only 8:13 in the fourth quarter. He finished the 2016 NFL season with 82 combined tackles (56 solo), three pass deflections, and two interceptions on 16 games and 15 starts.

On March 10, 2017, Byrd was released by the Saints.

=== Carolina Panthers ===
On October 3, 2017, Byrd was signed by the Carolina Panthers.

=== NFL statistics ===
Year	Team	GP	COMB	TOTAL	AST	SACK	FF	FR	FR YDS	INT	IR YDS	AVG IR	LNG	TD	PD
2009	BUF	14	45	33	12	0.0	0	0	0	9	118	13	37	0	11
2010	BUF	16	89	62	27	1.0	3	2	0	1	37	37	37	1	2
2011	BUF	16	98	75	23	1.0	3	1	0	3	88	29	37	1	8
2012	BUF	16	76	53	23	0.0	4	2	0	5	81	16	45	0	6
2013	BUF	11	48	37	11	1.0	1	0	0	4	85	21	57	0	6
2014	NO	4	22	17	5	0.0	1	0	0	0	0	0	0	0	2
2015	NO	13	53	37	16	1.0	1	1	1	1	24	24	24	0	3
2016	NO	16	82	56	26	0.0	0	0	0	2	35	17	24	0	3
2017	CAR	12	11	9	2	0.0	0	0	0	0	0	0.0	0	0	0
Career		118	524	379	145	4.0	13	6	1	25	468	19	57	2	41

== Personal life ==
His father, Gill Byrd, played in the National Football League for the San Diego Chargers from 1983 to 1992, and was the defensive backs coach for the Buffalo Bills for the 2017-18 season. He was the passing game coordinator/safeties coach at the University of Illinois from 2018-19.

Byrd is cousins with Richard Rodgers. His uncle is Richard Rodgers Sr.

Byrd is a Christian. He also sponsors two children through Compassion International.
