= Matt Sheldon =

American football coach

Personal information
- Born: Berwyn, Illinois, U.S.

Career information
- High school: D.C. Everest High School
- College: University of Minnesota

Career history
- New Orleans Saints (1996) Video assistant; Wisconsin Badgers (1997–2000) Graduate assistant; St. Louis Rams (2001–05) Defensive assistant; Buffalo Bills (2006–09) Linebackers coach; Minnesota Vikings (2010–11) Assistant defensive backs coach; Montreal Alouettes (2012) Linebackers coach; Chicago Bears (2015–17) Director of analytics and football research; Miami Dolphins (2017–2019) Director of football research and strategy; New York Jets (2019–2020) Director of football research and strategy; Denver Broncos (2021) Senior analyst; Las Vegas Raiders (2022–2023) Director of football research and strategy; Las Vegas Raiders (2024) Game management; Las Vegas Raiders (2025-2026) Director of Research and Development

Matt Sheldon most recently served as Director, Research and Development for the Las Vegas Raiders of the National Football League (NFL). He is a professional football coach, analyst and researcher with extensive NFL experience in research/analytics, in-game strategy, coaching and video editing with the New York Jets, Miami Dolphins, Chicago Bears, Minnesota Vikings, Buffalo Bills, St. Louis Rams and New Orleans Saints. Additionally, he has worked with the Montreal Alouettes of the Canadian Football League (CFL) and the Wisconsin Badgers of the NCAA. Sheldon also served as director of sports solutions development with Zebra Sports, the official provider of player tracking for the NFL. Sheldon has consulted with teams and leagues at the professional, olympic, collegiate and high school levels in North America and Europe. His areas of focus include strategy/tactics and decision-making, athlete tracking systems and elite athlete performance. He is a graduate of the University of Minnesota's Carlson School of Management and the University of Wisconsin M.B.A. Program.

== Coaching/front office history ==
=== Wisconsin Badgers (1997–2000) ===
Sheldon's coaching career began in 1997 at the University of Wisconsin-Madison, where he served as a graduate assistant under head coach Barry Alvarez. Sheldon assisted with the defensive secondary. In 1998, the Badgers led the NCAA in scoring defense (10.2 points per game) en route to a co-Big Ten championship and 38–31 Rose Bowl victory over UCLA. The following season, the Badgers led the Big Ten in scoring defense (13.2 points/game – fifth nationally), total defense (301.6 yards/game – 14th nationally) and pass efficiency defense (96.3 yards/game – fifth nationally) en route to an outright Big Ten championship and another Rose Bowl victory, this time over Stanford, making the Badgers the first school in Big Ten history to win back-to-back Rose Bowls. In the convincing 22–9 victory, the Badgers’ defense held the Cardinal, which ranked sixth nationally in scoring offense (37.2 points/game), to just seven points. All four of the Badgers' starting defensive backs in 1999 earned first team, second team or honorable mention all-conference honors. The group prominently featured cornerback Jamar Fletcher, who led the NCAA in interceptions (seven) in 1998 and earned numerous All-America honors in ’99. In 2000, Fletcher earned consensus All-America honors, was named the Big Ten Defensive Player of the Year and won the Jim Thorpe Award as the nation's most outstanding defensive back. Fletcher finished his collegiate career as Wisconsin's all-time leader in interceptions (21).

=== St. Louis Rams (2001–05) ===
Sheldon held several coaching positions on the Rams’ staff under head coach Mike Martz. Over Sheldon's five years in St. Louis, the Rams made the playoffs three times, including an appearance in Super Bowl XXXVI in the 2001 NFL season. His duties with the Rams varied from special teams to defensive backs to linebackers, including special assignments and research for offense, defense, special teams and head coaches Mike Martz and Joe Vitt.

From 2001 to 2003, Sheldon worked on the Rams’ defensive coaching staff under defensive coordinator Lovie Smith. The 2001 Rams defeated the Philadelphia Eagles in the NFC Championship Game and advanced to Super Bowl XXXVI, where they lost to the New England Patriots. The high-performing offense was led by 2001 NFL Most Valuable Player Kurt Warner and AP Offensive Player of the Year Marshall Faulk, among others. Martz employed an offensive philosophy based on the “Air Coryell” system, made famous in the 1970s and 80s by then-San Diego Chargers head coach Don Coryell. The defensive side, where Sheldon worked as defensive assistant/quality control coach, featured Hall of Fame cornerback Aeneas Williams, linebacker London Fletcher, and defensive ends Grant Wistrom and Leonard Little, among others.

The 2001 season concluded the Rams’ three-year run (1999–2001) as “The Greatest Show on Turf,” considered by many among the top offensive stretches in NFL history. In each of the three seasons, the Rams’ offense:

- Scored more than 500 points (set NFL Record).
- Ranked No. 1 in NFL in passing yards and passing TDs (three-year totals of 14,975 passing yards and 115 passing TDs both set NFL records for three consecutive seasons).
- Ranked No. 1 in NFL in passer rating, completion percentage and yards per pass attempt.
- Scored three or more TDs from scrimmage in 41 total regular-season games (out of 48).
- Had the NFL MVP award-winner – Kurt Warner in 1999 and 2001; Marshall Faulk in 2000.

In 2003, the Rams finished the regular season 12–4, winning the AFC West division title for the second time in three years. Their season ended with an overtime loss to the Carolina Panthers in the divisional round of the playoffs.

In 2004, after defensive coordinator Lovie Smith departed to become head coach of the Chicago Bears, Sheldon's focus switched from the defensive secondary to linebackers, working with linebackers coach Joe Vitt and new defensive coordinator Larry Marmie. The 2004 Rams finished the regular season 8–8, earning another playoff bid as a wild card and a playoff date at the division-champion Seattle Seahawks. The Rams beat the Mike Holmgren-led NFC West Division Champion Seahawks before losing in the divisional round to the Atlanta Falcons.

=== Buffalo Bills (2006–09) ===
In 2006, Sheldon joined the Buffalo Bills as linebackers coach, where he worked for four seasons.

The Bills’ 2006 linebacker corps was led by veteran London Fletcher, whom Sheldon had previously worked with in St. Louis. Fletcher enjoyed one of the top statistical years of his career in 2006, leading the team with 157 tackles and scoring two defensive touchdowns. Fletcher's four interceptions and 11 passes defensed on the year both led all NFL linebackers. Sheldon also shaped the development of veteran linebacker Angelo Crowell, who in only 11 games logged 95 tackles, two interceptions, two sacks and a forced fumble.

In 2007, Sheldon led one of the NFL's youngest linebacking groups. After rookie second-round pick Paul Posluszny’s season (26 tackles) was cut short in Week 3 by a broken forearm, second-year undrafted free agent middle linebacker John DiGiorgio started the remaining 13 games and produced 137 tackles (second on team), an interception and two sacks. Crowell also saw an uptick in production, posting a career-high and team leading 140 tackles (fourth in AFC). Crowell posted the most tackles for an outside linebacker in the AFC and made a number of game-changing plays, including a safety, sack, interception, forced fumble and fumble recovery.

The linebacking corps continued its growth under Sheldon in 2008. In his first full season, Posluszny posted a team-high 129 tackles, along with an interception and a fumble recovery. Veteran Kawika Mitchell, whom the team signed as a free agent prior to the season, contributed 91 tackles, four sacks, two interceptions and 15 quarterback pressures.

In 2009, Sheldon helped steer the Bills’ young linebacking corps through an injury-plagued season. Despite using nine different starters over the course of the year, Sheldon's linebackers helped Buffalo's defense finish second in the NFL in both pass defense (184.3 yards per game) and interceptions (28). With starters Mitchell and Keith Ellison out for the year due to injuries in the first half of the season, the group was again led by Posluszny, who despite being limited by injury to 12 games outpaced his full 2008 season with a team-high 116 tackles, including six for losses. Posluszny flashed big-play potential, logging three interceptions, three forced fumbles, one sack and 12 quarterback pressures. With injuries taking a toll on his position group, Sheldon also helped convert strong safety Bryan Scott to linebacker, where in just nine games he totaled 54 tackles, two sacks and three quarterback pressures. Additionally, rookie Nic Harris contributed 25 tackles in just three games.

=== Minnesota Vikings (2010–11) ===
Sheldon served as assistant defensive backs coach during both of his seasons in Minnesota.

In 2010, the Vikings’ secondary helped the defense rank eighth in the NFL in total defense (312.6 yards/game) and ninth in pass defense (210.4 yards/game). The unit featured veteran Antoine Winfield, who earned a Pro Bowl nod, along with third-year pro Husain Abdullah, whose development Sheldon directed. In Abdullah's first year as a starter, the former undrafted free agent led the Vikings’ secondary with 105 tackles, including three for losses, along with three interceptions. As a whole, the secondary allowed only 49 plays of 20 or more yards all year – fourth-best in the NFL.

In 2011, with injuries cutting short the seasons of both Abdullah and Winfield, Sheldon's attention turned to the development of inexperienced players, like third-year pro and former seventh-round pick Jamarca Sanford. Despite starting only three games over his first two seasons, Sanford logged 15 starts at strong safety, recording 118 tackles, a forced fumble and two interceptions. Prior to his season-ending injury in Week 9, Abdullah recorded 62 tackles, seven passes defensed, a sack, an interception and four tackles for losses. His 16 tackles in the team's opener at San Diego tied for second-most in a single game by a defensive back in Vikings history. Following Abdullah's injury, Sheldon helped ready rookie sixth-round pick Mistral Raymond, who started the team's final five games at free safety. Upon assuming the starting role, Raymond showed steady improvement and posted his best performance of the season in a week 16 win against Washington, in which he posted six tackles, two passes defensed and an interception returned for 31 yards.

=== Montreal Alouettes (2012) ===
Alouettes head coach Marc Trestman hired Sheldon as linebackers coach prior to the 2012 Canadian Football League season. The Alouettes finished atop the CFL's East Division and earned an appearance in the East Division Finals. Under Sheldon's tutelage, middle linebacker Shea Emry posted career highs in tackles (87) and sacks (seven) on his way to being named a CFL All Star and finishing as the CFL's East Division Most Outstanding Defensive Player and runner-up for Most Outstanding Canadian Player. Sheldon also guided the transition of free agent outside linebacker Rod Davis to the Alouettes’ 3–4 defensive scheme. Davis tallied five sacks and three interceptions on the season.

=== Chicago Bears (2015–17) ===
Sheldon was hired in spring 2015 to lead the Chicago Bears’ football research and analytics, where he combined his coaching, technology and statistical analysis backgrounds to create efficiencies within the coaching and player personnel staff.

=== Miami Dolphins (2017–2019) ===
Sheldon joined the Dolphins in spring 2017 as the team's director of football research and strategy, focusing on in-game strategy, league wide research and staff/player development.

=== New York Jets (2019–2020) ===
Sheldon joined the New York Jets in summer of 2019 as the team's director of football research and strategy.

=== Denver Broncos (2021) ===
Sheldon was hired by the Denver Broncos as a Senior Analyst.

=== Las Vegas Raiders (2022–present) ===
Sheldon was hired by the Las Vegas Raiders as the director of football research and strategy. On February 23 Sheldon was retained by new head coach Antonio Pierce and general manager Tom Telesco but his role changed to game management coach. Pete Carroll fired Sheldon in February 2025

== Postseason participation ==
- 1998: Outback Bowl
- 1999: Rose Bowl
- 2000: Rose Bowl
- 2001: Super Bowl XXXVI
- 2003: NFC Divisional Playoffs
- 2004: NFC Divisional Playoffs
- 2012: CFL East Division Finals

== Coaching and front office tree ==
1996: New Orleans Saints

Head coaches: Jim Mora, Rick Venturi

Assistants: Jim Haslett, Jim Mora Jr., Bruce Arians, Bobby April, John Matsko, Carl Smith, John Pagano, Jeff Davidson

GM: Bill Kuharich

1997–1999: University of Wisconsin

Head coach: Barry Alvarez

Assistants: Kevin Cosgrove, John Palermo, Phil Elmassian, Jay Hayes, Joe Baker

A.D.: Pat Richter

2001–2005: St. Louis Rams

Head coaches: Mike Martz, Joe Vitt

Assistants: Lovie Smith, Larry Marmie, Joe Vitt, Ron Meeks, Perry Fewell, Bill Kollar, Kurt Schottenheimer, Bob Babich

GM: Charley Armey

2006–2009: Buffalo Bills

Head coaches: Dick Jauron, Perry Fewell

Assistants: Perry Fewell, Bill Kollar, George Catavolos, Bob Sanders, DeMontie Cross

GM: Marv Levy and Russ Brandon

2010–11: Minnesota Vikings

Head coaches: Brad Childress, Leslie Frazier

Assistants: Leslie Frazier, Fred Pagac, Mike Singletary, Joe Woods, Karl Dunbar

GM: Rick Spielman

Assistant GM: George Paton

2012: Montreal Alouettes

Head coach: Marc Trestman

Assistants: Jeff Reinebold, Mike Sinclair

GM: Jim Popp

2015: Chicago Bears

Head coach: John Fox

Assistants: Adam Gase, Vic Fangio, Jeff Rodgers, Dowell Loggains, Ed Donatell

GM: Ryan Pace

Director of Pro Scouting: Champ Kelly

2017: Miami Dolphins

Head coach: Adam Gase

Assistants: Darren Rizzi, Matt Burke, Dowell Loggains, Clyde Christensen, Shane Day, Jay Kaiser

EVP Football Operations: Mike Tannenbaum

GM: Chris Grier

Director of Pro Scouting: Anthony Hunt

== Television ==
In 2012 and 2013, Sheldon occasionally appeared on the London, U.K., based Channel 4 TV show American Football Live, offering detailed NFL insight and analysis via a video link to host Nat Coombs and resident analyst Mike Carlson.

== Personal ==
Sheldon is a native of Schofield, Wisconsin, and was a football and track & field standout at D.C. Everest High School. He attended the University of Minnesota on a football scholarship, where he played defensive back for the football team (1987–91) and graduated from the Carlson School of Management. Sheldon then went on to earn a master's degree from the University of Wisconsin MBA program while serving as a graduate assistant for the Badger football team. He currently resides in a suburb of Fort Lauderdale, FL.
