= Da'Norris Searcy =

American football player (born 1988)

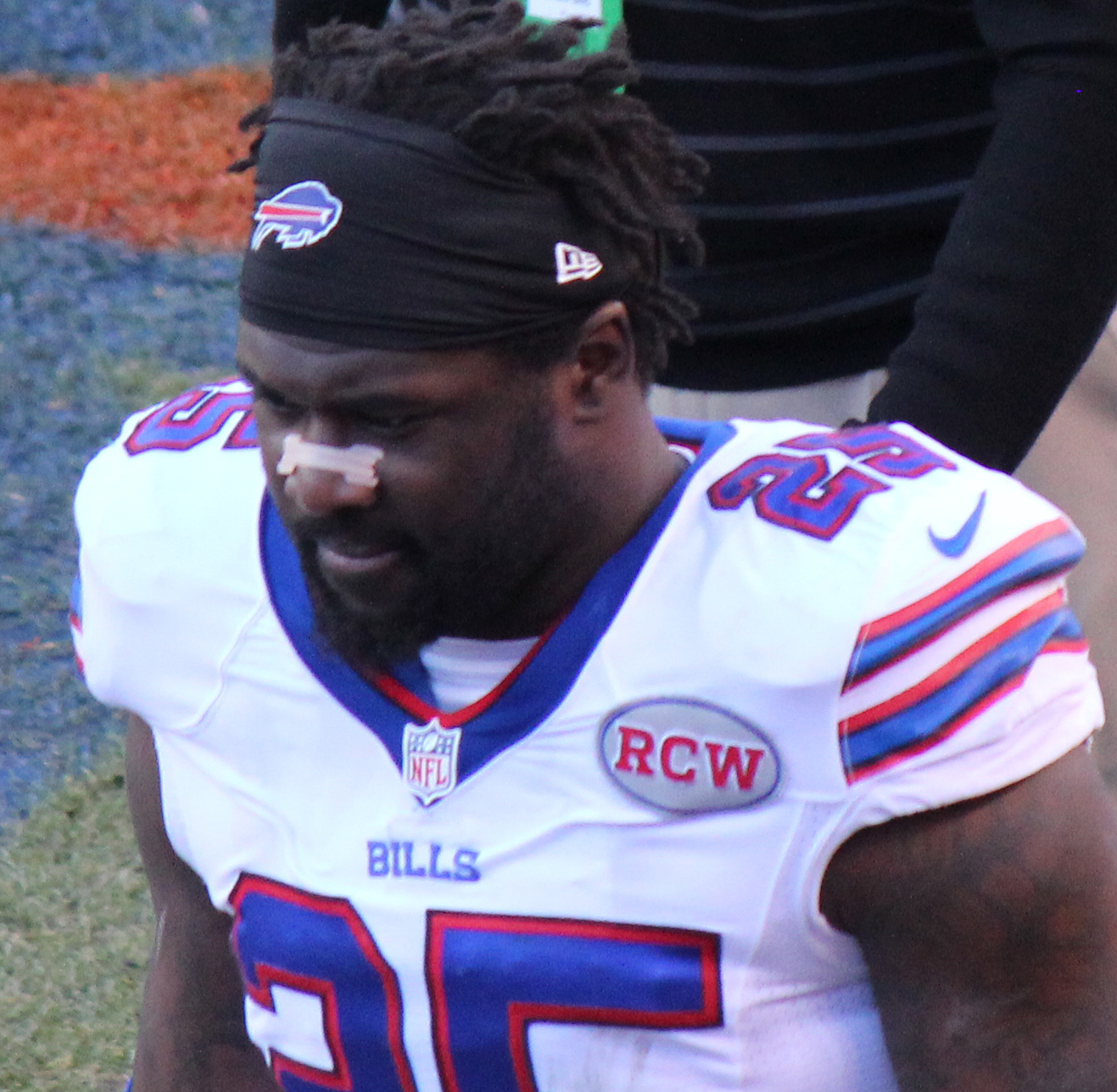
- Searcy with the Buffalo Bills in 2014

No. 25, 21
- Position: Safety

Personal information
- Born: November 16, 1988 (age 37); Decatur, Georgia, U.S.
- Listed height: 5 ft 11 in (1.80 m)
- Listed weight: 205 lb (93 kg)

Career information
- High school: Towers (Decatur)
- College: North Carolina (2007–2010)
- NFL draft: 2011: 4th round, 100th overall pick

Career history
- Buffalo Bills (2011–2014); Tennessee Titans (2015–2017); Carolina Panthers (2018)

Career NFL statistics
- Total tackles: 335
- Sacks: 4.5
- Forced fumbles: 3
- Fumble recoveries: 3
- Interceptions: 8
- Defensive touchdowns: 1
- Stats at Pro Football Reference

Da'Norris Searcy (born November 16, 1988) is an American former professional football player who was a safety in the National Football League (NFL). He played college football for the North Carolina Tar Heels and was selected by the Buffalo Bills in the fourth round of the 2011 NFL draft. Searcy also played for the Tennessee Titans and Carolina Panthers.

== Early life ==
Searcy attended Towers High School, where he was a two way standout at both defensive back and running back. Searcy recorded 71 tackles, including 21 solo stops, eight tackles for losses and three sacks, as a senior. He also rushed for 1,607 yards and 16 touchdowns as a senior. In track & field, Searcy recorded personal-best times of 11.18 seconds in the 100m and 23.31 seconds in the 200m.

Considered only a two-star recruit by Rivals.com, Searcy had quite a lot of offers from top BCS schools including Florida, Virginia Tech and Ole Miss. However, he ultimately decided to attend the University of North Carolina at Chapel Hill and play for the Tar Heels.

== College career ==
In 2007, Searcy was one of 11 true freshmen to see action. He played in all 12 games primarily on special teams.

As a sophomore in 2008, Searcy played primarily on special teams and as a reserve safety. He played in all 13 games and finished the season with 25 tackles, two sacks and three pass breakups.

In 2009, Searcy moved into the starting safety spot and also served as Carolina's starting punt returner. He finished the season with 35 tackles, an interception, three pass deflections, and returned seven kickoffs for an average of 23.1 yards.

As a senior in 2010, Searcy started nine of 10 games. He missed the first three games of the year while Carolina worked with the NCAA to determine his eligibility after violations, mostly receiving improper benefits committed by Searcy and other players part of the football program. He returned to the team, and recorded 37 tackles, including two for losses, and a team high four interceptions.

== Professional career ==
=== Pre-draft ===
Searcy attended the NFL Scouting Combine in Indianapolis and completed all of the combine and positional drills. On March 31, 2011, Searcy participated at North Carolina's pro day and attempted to improve his 40-yard dash (4.50s), 20-yard dash (2.68s), 10-yard dash (1.62s), and broad jump (10'5"). At the conclusion of the pre-draft process, Searcy was projected to be a third or fourth round pick by NFL draft experts and scouts. He was ranked as the second best strong safety in the draft by DraftScout.com.

External videos
- Da'Norris Searcy's NFL Combine Workout

Pre-draft measurables
Height	Weight	Arm length	Hand span	Wingspan	40-yard dash	10-yard split	20-yard split	20-yard shuttle	Three-cone drill	Vertical jump	Broad jump	Bench press
5 ft 10 5/8 in (1.79 m)	223 lb (101 kg)	33 1/2 in (0.85 m)	9 1/2 in (0.24 m)	6 ft 6 1/8 in (1.98 m)	4.50 s	1.62 s	2.68 s	4.09 s	6.87 s	33 in (0.84 m)	10 ft 5 in (3.18 m)	27 reps
All values from NFL Combine/Pro Day

=== Buffalo Bills ===
==== 2011 ====
The Buffalo Bills selected Searcy in the fourth round (100th overall) of the 2011 NFL draft. He was the fourth safety drafted in 2011.

On July 29, 2011, the Bills signed Searcy to a four-year, $2.52 million contract that includes a signing bonus of $484,424.

Throughout training camp, Searcy competed to be the starting strong safety against George Wilson and Bryan Scott. Head coach Chan Gailey named Searcy the third strong safety on the Bills' depth chart to start the regular season, behind George Wilson and Bryan Scott.

Searcy made his professional regular season debut in the season-opening 41–7 road victory over the Kansas City Chiefs. In the next game, Searcy deflected a pass and made his first career interception during the 38–35 win against the Oakland Raiders in Week 2. Searcy intercepted a pass by quarterback Jason Campbell, that was originally intended for wide receiver Denarius Moore, to seal the Bills' victory as time expired in the fourth quarter. On November 20, 2011, Searcy earned his first career sack after George Wilson injured his neck and missed three games (Weeks 11–13). He finished the Bills' 35–8 loss at the Miami Dolphins with a season-high 11 combined tackles (nine solo). In Week 13, he recorded nine combined tackles (six solo) in a 23–17 loss to the Tennessee Titans.

Searcy finished his rookie year with 34 combined tackles (26 solo), a pass deflection, and an interception in 16 games and three starts.

==== 2012 ====
Searcy entered training camp slated as a backup safety. Defensive coordinator Dave Wannstedt retained Searcy as the backup safety, behind Jairus Byrd and George Wilson, to start the regular season. On December 9, 2012, he collected a season-high five combined tackles in the Bills' 15–12 loss to the St. Louis Rams in Week 14. Searcy was inactive during the Bills' Week 17 victory against the New York Jets due to a groin injury he suffered the previous week. On December 31, 2012, the Buffalo Bills fired head coach Chan Gailey after they finished the 2012 season with a 6–10 record. Searcy completed his second season with 39 combined tackles (26 solo), two forced fumbles, and a pass deflection in 15 games and zero starts.

==== 2013 ====
Defensive coordinator Mike Pettine held a competition to name a new strong safety between Searcy, Aaron Williams, and Duke Williams. The role became vacant after George Wilson departed for the Carolina Panthers in free agency. Head coach Doug Marrone named Searcy the starting strong safety to start the 2013 regular season, alongside free safety Aaron Williams. Searcy became the starter after Jairus Byrd was sidelined for the first six regular season games due to plantar fasciitis.

He started in the Buffalo Bills' season-opener against the New England Patriots and recorded nine combined tackles, made his first career sack, and returned a fumble recovery for his first career touchdown in their 23–21 loss. Searcy made his first sack on quarterback Tom Brady for a five-yard loss in the second quarter. He also recovered a fumble by running back Stevan Ridley, after it was stripped by teammate Kiko Alonso, and returned it for a 74-yard touchdown in the second quarter. In Week 6, Searcy collected a career-high 16 combined tackles (13 solo) and sacked quarterback Andy Dalton for a ten-yard loss during the third quarter of the Bills' 27–24 victory against the Cincinnati Bengals. Searcy was demoted to backup strong safety behind Jairus Byrd in Week 8 and remained the backup for the remainder of the season. On November 17, 2013, Searcy deflected a pass and returned an interception for a touchdown during a 37–14 win against the New York Jets in Week 11. Searcy intercepted a pass by quarterback Geno Smith and returned it for a 32-yard touchdown in the third quarter. He finished the 2013 season with 71 combined tackles (48 solo), seven pass deflections, a career-high 3.5 sacks, two touchdowns, a fumble recovery, and an interception in 16 games and seven starts.

==== 2014 ====
The Buffalo Bills hired former Detroit Lions' head coach Jim Schwartz as the new defensive coordinator after Mike Pettine accepted the head coaching position with the Cleveland Browns. Schwartz held a competition between Searcy and Duke Williams during training camp after Jairus Byrd departed for the New Orleans Saints during free agency. Head coach Doug Marrone officially named Searcy the starting strong safety to start the regular season, along with free safety Aaron Williams.

On November 30, 2014, Searcy recorded four combined tackles, three pass deflections, and intercepted two passes by quarterback Brian Hoyer during a 26–10 victory against the Cleveland Browns in Week 13. This marked Searcy's first multi-interception game of his career. Searcy was inactive for the Bills' Week 15 victory against the Green Bay Packers due to a hamstring injury. In Week 16, he collected a season-high 11 combined tackles (nine solo) in the Bills' 26–24 loss at the Oakland Raiders. He finished the 2014 season with 55 total tackles (34 solo), five pass deflections, a forced fumble, and 3 interceptions in 15 games and 13 starts.

Searcy became an unrestricted free agent after he completed his four-year contract with the Bills. Buffalo Bills' general manager Doug Whaley explained "Searcy is going to be a little challenging because we have paid Aaron Williams, and there's some money tied up in that position and Searcy may probably garner starting money at safety. That's going to be a little more challenging getting that done just because of the cap space used on that position." He received interest from multiple teams, including the Indianapolis Colts, Houston Texans, Oakland Raiders, and Miami Dolphins.

=== Tennessee Titans ===
==== 2015 ====
On March 10, 2015, the Tennessee Titans signed Searcy to a four-year, $24 million contract with $10.50 million guaranteed.

He entered training camp slated as the de facto strong safety. Head coach Ken Whisenhunt officially named Searcy the starting strong safety to start the 2015 regular season, alongside starting free safety Michael Griffin. On October 18, 2015, Searcy collected a season-high eight solo tackles and three pass deflections during a 38–10 victory against the Miami Dolphins in Week 6. On November 4, 2015, the Tennessee Titans fired head coach Ken Whisenhunt after they began the season with a 1–6 record. Assistant head coach/tight ends coach Mike Mularkey was named the interim head coach for the last nine games of the season. He was sidelined for the Titans' Week 15 loss at the New England Patriots after injuring his hamstring. He finished his first season with the Tennessee Titans with 55 combined tackles (42 solo), four pass deflections, an interception, and was credited with half a sack in 15 games and 15 starts.

==== 2016 ====
Head coach Mike Mularkey named Searcy the starting strong safety to start the regular season, alongside free safety Rashad Johnson. He started the Tennessee Titans' season-opener against the Minnesota Vikings and collected a season-high eight solo tackles and a pass deflection in their 25–16 loss. Searcy was inactive for two games (Weeks 4–5) due to a sprained ankle. In Week 12, Searcy made two combined tackles, two pass deflections, and made an interception in the Titans' 27–21 victory at the Chicago Bears. Searcy finished the season with 40 combined tackles (35 solo), six pass deflections, and an interception in 14 games and starts.

==== 2017 ====
Throughout training camp, Searcy competed against offseason acquisition Johnathan Cyprien to be the starting strong safety. Head coach Mike Mularkey named Searcy the backup strong safety to start the regular season behind Cyprien.

Searcy started at strong safety for six games (Weeks 2–7) after Johnathan Cyprien sustained a hamstring injury in the Titans' season-opener. On September 17, 2017, Searcy recorded three combined tackles, deflected a pass, and intercepted a pass by quarterback Blake Bortles early in the third quarter of the Titans' 37–16 victory over the Jacksonville Jaguars in Week 2. In Week 5, Searcy collected a season-high five combined tackles and broke up a pass during a 16–10 loss at the Miami Dolphins.

Searcy finished the season with 26 combined tackles (15 solo), two pass deflections, and an interception in 16 games and six starts. Pro Football Focus gave Searcy an overall grade of 71.5, which ranked 38th among all qualifying safeties in 2017.

On March 9, 2018, Searcy was released by the Titans.

=== Carolina Panthers ===
On March 23, 2018, the Carolina Panthers signed Searcy to a two-year, $5.7 million contract with a signing bonus of $1.3 million. On September 21, Searcy was placed on injured reserve after suffering a concussion in Week 2.

On May 6, 2019, Searcy was released by the Panthers.

== NFL career statistics ==
=== Regular season ===
Year	Team	Games		Tackles				Interceptions						Fumbles			
Year	Team	GP	GS	Cmb	Solo	Ast	Sck	PD	Int	Yds	Avg	Lng	TD	FF	FR	Yds	TD
2011	BUF	16	3	34	26	8	0.0	1	1	0	0.0	0	0	0	0	0	0
2012	BUF	15	0	39	26	13	0.0	1	0	0	0.0	0	0	2	0	0	0
2013	BUF	16	7	71	48	23	3.5	7	1	32	32.0	32	1	0	2	74	1
2014	BUF	15	13	65	44	13	0.5	5	3	70	23.3	32	0	0	1	0	0
2015	TEN	15	13	55	42	19	0.0	4	1	5	5.0	5	0	0	0	0	0
2016	TEN	14	14	40	35	5	0.0	6	1	0	0.0	0	0	0	1	0	0
2017	TEN	16	6	26	15	11	0.0	2	1	8	8.0	8	0	0	0	0	0
2018	CAR	2	2	5	4	1	0.0	0	0	0	0.0	0	0	0	0	0	0
Career		109	58	335	240	95	4.5	26	8	115	14.4	32	1	3	4	74	1

== Post-playing career ==
Searcy currently works at his alma mater as the Director of Football Student-Athlete Development.
