= Gatewood (name) =

Gatewood is both a surname and a given name. Notable people with the name include:

Surname:

- Aubrey Gatewood (1938–2019), baseball player
- Bill Gatewood (1881–1962), Negro leagues pitcher and manager
- Charles B. Gatewood, military officer who persuaded Geronimo to surrender to the US Army
- Curtis Gatewood (born 1985), American football linebacker
- Doug Gatewood, Democratic member of the Kansas House of Representatives
- George David Gatewood (born 1940), American astronomer
- Grandma Gatewood (1887–1973), extreme hiker and ultra-light hiking pioneer
- Kimmy Gatewood, American actress
- Otis Gatewood (1911–1999), preacher and missionary in Churches of Christ
- Paul Gatewood, American politician
- Randy Gatewood (born 1973), American football player
- Robert L. Gatewood (born 1956), business developer and host of the Marketing Pulpit Show
- Sean Gatewood, Democratic member of the Kansas House of Representatives
- Tom Gatewood (born 1950), American football player
- Yusuf Gatewood (born 1982), Canadian-American film actor

Given name:

- Gatewood Galbraith (1947–2012), American lawyer and author
- Gatewood Lincoln (1875–1957), American Navy officer; 19th and 22nd Governor of American Samoa
