= Gatewood =

Gatewood may refer to:

== People ==
- Gatewood (name)

== Places ==
in the United States

- Gatewood, Missouri, an unincorporated community in southwest Ripley County, Missouri
- Gatewood, Seattle, a neighborhood in West Seattle, Seattle, Washington
- Gatewood, West Virginia, an unincorporated community

== Other uses ==
- Gatewood (horse), a racehorse
- Gatewood (Gallipolis, Ohio), a building listed on the National Register of Historic Places in Gallia County, Ohio

== See also ==
- Gatewood House (disambiguation)
