= Curtis Gatewood =

American gridiron football player (born 1985)

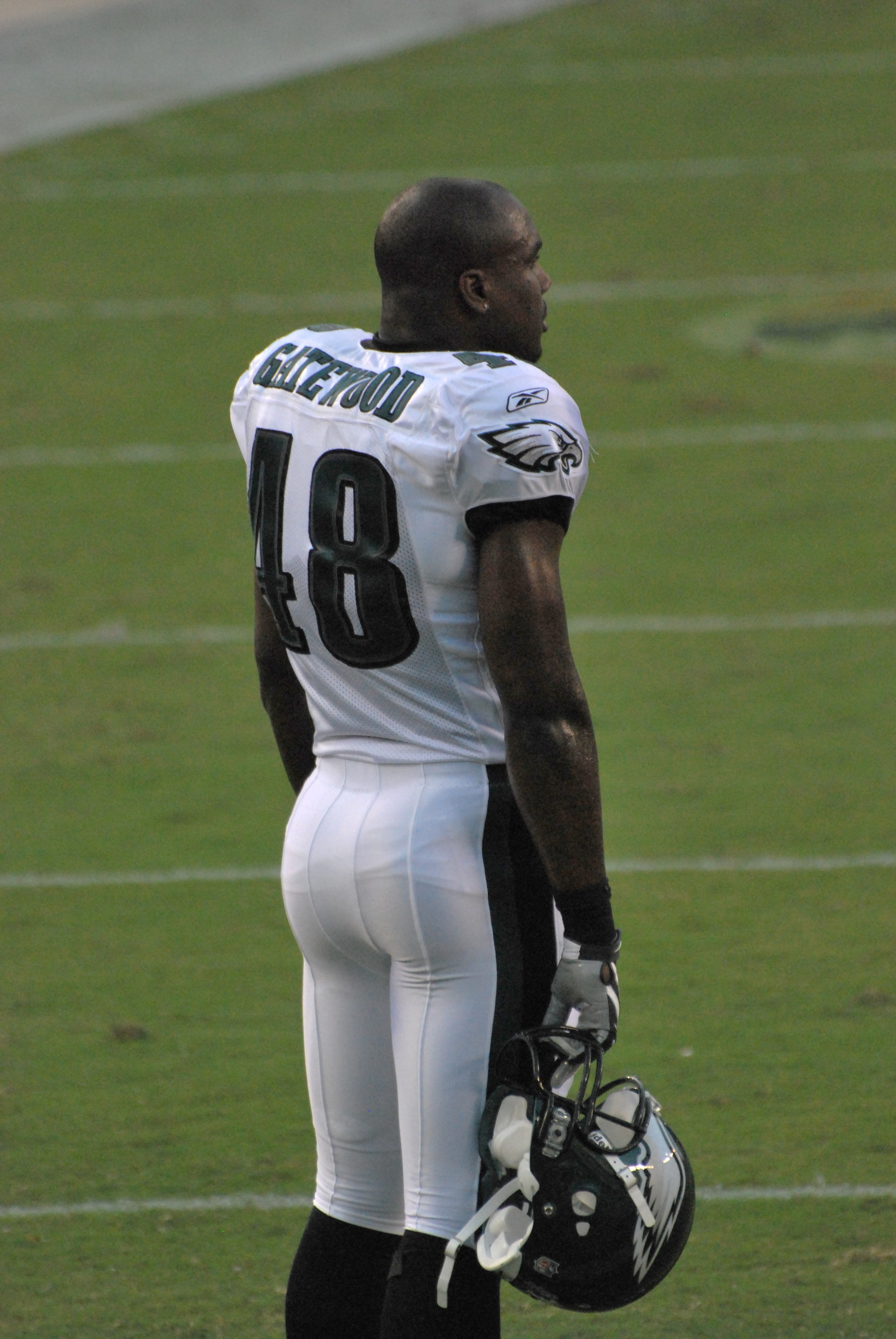
- Gatewood with the Philadelphia Eagles in 2009

No. 52, 57
- Position: Linebacker

Personal information
- Born: May 18, 1985 (age 41); Memphis, Tennessee, U.S.
- Listed height: 6 ft 3 in (1.91 m)
- Listed weight: 240 lb (109 kg)

Career information
- High school: White Station (Memphis)
- College: Vanderbilt
- NFL draft: 2008: undrafted

Career history
- Washington Redskins (2008)*; Kansas City Chiefs (2008); Detroit Lions (2009)*; Philadelphia Eagles (2009)*; Pittsburgh Steelers (2009)*; Washington Redskins (2009); Arizona Cardinals (2010); Saskatchewan Roughriders (2012)*
- * Offseason or practice squad member only

Career NFL statistics
- Tackles: 2
- Stats at Pro Football Reference

James Curtis Gatewood (born May 18, 1985) is an American former professional football player who was a linebacker in the National Football League (NFL). He played college football for the Vanderbilt Commodores and was signed by the Washington Redskins as an undrafted free agent in 2008.

Gatewood was also a member of the Kansas City Chiefs, Detroit Lions, Philadelphia Eagles, Pittsburgh Steelers, Arizona Cardinals, and Saskatchewan Roughriders.

== Early life ==
Gatewood was born to Beverly Burnette and James Gatewood in Memphis, Tennessee. Growing up, Gatewood played basketball and soccer before deciding to play football in the fourth grade. As a sophomore at White Station High School in Memphis, he played both tight end and defensive end before sitting out his junior year in football to play basketball and to run track. However, Gatewood returned to playing football as a senior and recorded 45 tackles, 2.5 sacks and two fumble recoveries while playing weakside linebacker. On offense, Gatewood caught nine passes for 146 yards and one touchdown. Following the season he was named First-team All-Region.

On July 8, 2003, Gatewood officially committed to Vanderbilt University becoming the first recruit from Memphis to sign with Vanderbilt since 1997. Gatewood also received scholarship offers from Mississippi State, Tennessee Tech and Memphis.

College recruiting
Name	Hometown	School	Height	Weight	40^{‡}	Commit date
Curtis Gatewood; LB	Memphis, Tennessee	White Station High School (TN)	6 ft 3 in (1.91 m)	245 lb (111 kg)	4.6	Jul 8, 2003
Curtis Gatewood; LB	Recruit ratings: Scout: Rivals:					
Overall recruit ranking:
Note: In many cases, Scout, Rivals, 247Sports, On3, and ESPN may conflict in their listings of height and weight.; In these cases, the average was taken. ESPN grades are on a 100-point scale.; Sources: "2003 Team Ranking". Rivals.com.

== College career ==
As a true freshman in 2003, Gatewood was redshirted but was named the scout team Defensive Player of the Week three times. In 2004, he played in every game as a backup linebacker and on special teams. He recorded nine tackles including multi tackle games on two occasions. As a redshirt sophomore in 2005, Gatewood moved from linebacker to defensive end and recorded 22 tackles. Against Arkansas and Florida he recorded a season-high four tackles.

Gatewood started every game for Vanderbilt in 2006 and led the team in sacks with seven. He set his career high in tackles and sacks on September 30 against Tennessee State with nine and 1.5 respectively. He ended his junior season with 49 tackles, eight sacks, three fumble recoveries and two forced fumbles.

To start off his senior season in 2007, Gatewood sacked Ole Miss quarterback Brent Schaeffer on fourth down which gave the Commodores the ball. Vanderbilt scored on the following drive giving them a 31–17 lead. On October 20, Gatewood teamed up with linebacker Marcus Buggs to sack South Carolina quarterback Blake Mitchell on consecutive downs to preserve a 17–6 lead for Vanderbilt. He ended the season with seven sacks after he predicted he'd record 15 sacks before the season.

== Professional career ==
=== First stint with Redskins ===
Gatewood went undrafted in the 2008 NFL draft and signed with the Washington Redskins on April 28 as an undrafted free agent. He was waived as a final cut on August 30 after spending the entire offseason with the team. He was re-signed to the practice squad the next day. However, Gatewood was released from the practice squad on September 24 in favor of linebacker Johnny Baldwin. Gatewood was re-signed to the practice squad on October 10 after Baldwin suffered a knee injury.

=== Kansas City Chiefs ===
Gatewood was signed off the Redskins practice squad by the Kansas City Chiefs on November 20, 2008. He played in six games for the Chiefs recording his first career tackle on December 7 against the Denver Broncos and then another tackle on December 28 against Cincinnati. He was waived by Kansas City on April 21, 2009, following the season.

=== Detroit Lions ===
The Detroit Lions claimed Gatewood off waivers on April 23, 2009 before being waived/injured on August 9 with a hamstring injury.

=== Philadelphia Eagles ===
Gatewood was signed by the Philadelphia Eagles on August 25, 2009. He was released as a final cut on September 5.

=== Pittsburgh Steelers ===
After spending almost three months unemployed, Gatewood was signed to the Pittsburgh Steelers' practice squad on November 19, 2009 taking the spot of Donovan Woods.

=== Second stint with Redskins ===
On December 15, 2009, Gatewood was signed off Pittsburgh's practice squad by the Washington Redskins. He was cut from the roster on September 4, 2010.

=== Arizona Cardinals ===
Gatewood was signed to the Arizona Cardinals' practice squad on September 7, 2010. He was released on September 21. He was re-signed to the practice squad on October 6. He was waived on August 29, 2011.
