= Gatewood House =

Gatewood House may refer to:

in the United States (by state):

- Gatewood House (Malvern, Arkansas), listed on the NRHP in Hot Spring County, Arkansas
- Gatewood House (San Diego, California), a registered Historic Landmark of San Diego
- Gatewood House (Eatonton, Georgia), listed on the NRHP in Georgia
- Gatewood (Gallipolis, Ohio), listed on the NRHP in Gallia County, Ohio
- McGavock-Gatewood-Webb House, Nashville, Tennessee, listed on the NRHP in Davidson County, Tennessee

== See also ==
- Gatewood (disambiguation)
