= Perry Fewell =

American football player and coach (born 1962)

Personal information
- Born: September 7, 1962 (age 64); Cramerton, North Carolina, U.S.

Career information
- High school: South Point (Belmont, North Carolina)
- College: Lenoir-Rhyne
- NFL draft: 1985: undrafted

Career history

Coaching
- North Carolina (1985–1986) Graduate assistant; Army (1987) Defensive backs coach; Kent State (1988–1991) Wide receivers coach; Army (1992–1994) Defensive line coach; Vanderbilt (1995–1997) Defensive backs coach; Jacksonville Jaguars (1998–2002) Defensive backs coach; St. Louis Rams (2003–2004) Defensive backs coach; Chicago Bears (2005) Defensive backs coach; Buffalo Bills (2006–2009) Defensive coordinator; Buffalo Bills (2009) Interim head coach; New York Giants (2010–2014) Defensive coordinator; Washington Redskins (2015–2016) Defensive backs coach; Jacksonville Jaguars (2017–2018) Defensive backs coach; Carolina Panthers (2019) Defensive backs coach; Carolina Panthers (2019) Interim head coach

Operations
- NFL Officiating (2020–present) Senior vice president of officiating administration

Awards and highlights
- Super Bowl champion (XLVI)

Head coaching record
- Regular season: 3–8 (.273)
- Coaching profile at Pro Football Reference

Perry Fewell (born September 7, 1962) is an American football coach. He currently serves as the senior vice president of officiating administration for the National Football League (NFL)'s officiating department. Previously, he served as the defensive backs coach or defensive coordinator for eight NFL teams between 1998 and 2019. He also served as the interim head coach for the Buffalo Bills in 2009 and for the Carolina Panthers in 2019. Fewell won Super Bowl XLVI as the defensive coordinator of the New York Giants, a position he held for five seasons.

== Early life ==
Fewell attended South Point High School in Belmont, North Carolina. In 1979, he helped lead the school to win the NCHSAA 3A football state championship.

=== College ===
Fewell attended Lenoir-Rhyne College and was a football standout. In football, he was a four-year letterman. As a senior, he was named the team's Most Improved Player.

== Coaching career ==
=== College ===
Fewell was a college coach for 13 years (1985–1997), working as an assistant at North Carolina, Army, Kent State, and Vanderbilt.

=== Jacksonville Jaguars ===
Fewell entered the NFL as the defensive backs coach for Tom Coughlin in 1998 and stayed there through 2002. Jacksonville's pass defense ranked third in the NFL in 1999 and two years later the Jaguars gave up only 13 touchdown passes.

=== St. Louis Rams ===
In 2003, Fewell moved to St. Louis, where he was the secondary coach of the Rams.

=== Chicago Bears ===
Fewell was a defensive backs coach with Chicago from 2004 to 2005 under head coach Lovie Smith.

=== Buffalo Bills ===
Fewell was hired as defensive coordinator of the Buffalo Bills in 2006. In what was statistically their best season under Fewell, the 2008 Bills defense ranked 2nd in the AFC in negative yardage plays, recorded 7 games of holding opposing offenses to less than 100 yards rushing, finished 4th in the NFL in red zone defense (41.8%), and allowed just 14 passing touchdowns all year.

In Week 10 of the 2009 season, the Bills fired head coach Dick Jauron after a 3–6 start and Fewell was appointed interim head coach. He led Buffalo to a 3–4 finish. Following the season finale, the Bills fired their entire coaching staff, including Fewell.

=== New York Giants ===
On January 14, 2010, Fewell was hired as defensive coordinator of the New York Giants. Fewell served under head coach Tom Coughlin, under whom Fewell previously worked during his time with the Jacksonville Jaguars. On February 5, 2012, the Giants defeated the New England Patriots 21–17 to win Super Bowl XLVI. Under his leadership, the Giants defense was often criticized for being "off and soft", allowing other teams to come back into games they should not have been able to. On January 7, 2015, the Giants and Fewell parted ways after he spent five years in charge of the defense.

=== Washington Redskins ===
Fewell served as defensive backs coach for the Washington Redskins for two seasons.

=== Jacksonville Jaguars (second stint) ===
After Tom Coughlin returned to the Jacksonville Jaguars as the executive vice president of football operations, Fewell was brought in to act as the defensive backs coach on Doug Marrone's staff.

=== Carolina Panthers ===
Fewell was named the secondary coach of the Carolina Panthers on January 15, 2019. He was named interim head coach on December 3, 2019, following the dismissal of Ron Rivera. The team lost all four games with Fewell acting as Head Coach.

== NFL officiating ==
In 2020, Fewell joined the NFL's officiating department as senior vice president of officiating administration.

== Head coaching record ==
Team	Year	Regular season					Postseason			
Team	Year	Won	Lost	Ties	Win %	Finish	Won	Lost	Win %	Result
BUF*	2009	3	4	0	.429	4th in AFC East	—	—	—	—
CAR*	2019	0	4	0	.000	4th in NFC South	—	—	—	—
Total		3	8	0	.273		0	0	.000	

* – Interim head coach
