= Paul Gatewood =

American politician

Member-elect of the Missouri House of Representatives from the 10th district
- Assuming office January 6, 2027
- Succeeding: Bill Falkner

Personal details
- Party: Republican
- Website: Campaign website

Paul Gatewood is an American politician of the Missouri Republican Party who is the representative-elect for the 10th district in the Missouri House of Representatives. He was elected in the 2026 general election. He is a veteran of the United States Marine Corps and the St. Joseph Police Department.
