= Otis Gatewood =

American minister (1911–1999)

Otis Gatewood (1911–1999) was a well-known preacher and missionary in Churches of Christ. Gatewood's work helped spur on the surge of domestic and foreign missions efforts of Churches of Christ that followed World War II. He was perhaps best known for his efforts in Europe; seeing thousands of Mormon missionaries return to America from Germany during World War II made him distressed that there were apparently no preachers of the Churches of Christ working there, so after the war ended he went to West Germany and preached there for ten years.

Gatewood's book You Can Do Personal Work was for many years one of the best known books on personal evangelism in Churches of Christ.

In 2013 the Lubbock Avalanche-Journal reported a 1992 meeting between Gatewood and Mikhail Gorbachev. In the context of the meeting Gatewood had accompanied food shipments to Russian orphans and elderly people from Churches of Christ in Texas. During the meeting Gorbachev claimed that he was "indeed a Christian and had been baptized by his grandfather in the Volga River many years before."
