= Nick Hennessey =

American gridiron football player (born 1986)

Williams Ephs
- Title: Offensive coordinator

Personal information
- Born: July 2, 1986 (age 40); Danvers, Massachusetts, U.S.
- Listed height: 6 ft 6 in (1.98 m)
- Listed weight: 305 lb (138 kg)

Career information
- College: Colgate
- NFL draft: 2009: undrafted

Career history

Playing
- Buffalo Bills (2009); BC Lions (2010–2011); Omaha Nighthawks (2011); Hamilton Tiger-Cats (2012)

Coaching
- St. Lawrence (2010–2012) Offensive line coach; St. Lawrence (2013) Running backs coach; Western Michigan (2014–2015) Offensive line coach; John Carroll (2016) Offensive line coach; Chattanooga (2017–2019) Offensive line coach; Williams (2019–2020) Running backs and tight ends coach; Williams (2021) Offensive line coach; Williams (2022–present) Offensive coordinator

Awards and highlights
- Second-team All-Patriot League (2007); First-team All-Patriot League (2008); Second-team AP All-American (2008)

Career NFL statistics
- Games played: 1
- Stats at Pro Football Reference
- Stats at CFL.ca (archive)

Nicholas George Hennessey (born July 2, 1986) is an American college football coach and former offensive tackle. He is the offensive coordinator for Williams College, a position he has held since 2022. He was signed by the Buffalo Bills as an undrafted free agent in 2009. He played college football at Colgate.

== Early life ==
Nicholas is the middle child of Jeanne and Mike Hennessey. He has an older sister, Jaclyn Hennessey Ford, and a younger sister, Megan Hennessey. He attended Danvers High School from 2000 to 2004 and graduated in 2004. During his senior year, he was the captain the football, basketball and lacrosse teams.

== Professional career ==
=== Buffalo Bills ===
Hennessey spent the bulk of the 2009 season on the Bills' Practice Squad, before being activated for one game during Week 17. He was waived by the Bills after the 2010 preseason.

=== BC Lions ===
On October 18, 2010, the BC Lions of the Canadian Football League signed Hennessey to their practice roster. He was released on November 5. The team re-signed him for the 2011 season on December 8.

=== Omaha Nighthawks ===
Hennessey was signed by the Omaha Nighthawks of the United Football League on August 23, 2011.

=== Hamilton Tiger-Cats ===
It was announced on April 13, 2012 that Hennessey had signed with the Hamilton Tiger-Cats.
