= George Wilson (safety) =

American football player (born 1981)

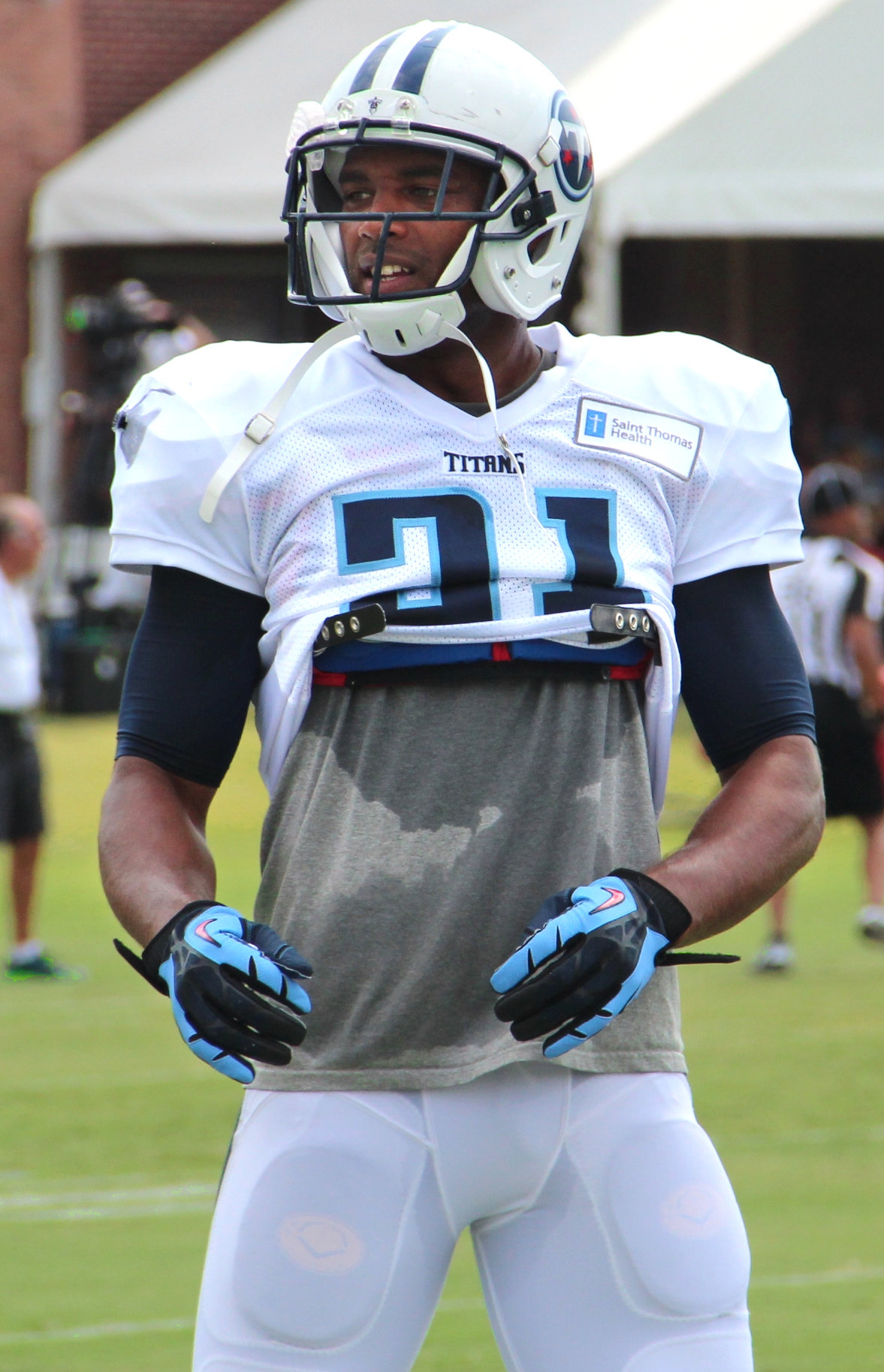
- Wilson with the Tennessee Titans in 2014

No. 15, 37, 21
- Position: Safety

Personal information
- Born: March 14, 1981 (age 45); Paducah, Kentucky, U.S.
- Listed height: 6 ft 0 in (1.83 m)
- Listed weight: 210 lb (95 kg)

Career information
- High school: Paducah Tilghman
- College: Arkansas
- NFL draft: 2004: undrafted

Career history
- Detroit Lions (2004)*; Buffalo Bills (2004–2012); Tennessee Titans (2013–2014)
- * Offseason or practice squad member only

Awards and highlights
- Second-team All-SEC (2003)

Career NFL statistics
- Total tackles: 526
- Sacks: 4.5
- Forced fumbles: 4
- Fumble recoveries: 5
- Interceptions: 14
- Defensive touchdowns: 2
- Stats at Pro Football Reference

George Eugene Wilson Jr. (born March 14, 1981) is an American former professional football player who was a safety in the National Football League (NFL). He played college football for the Arkansas Razorbacks and was signed by the Detroit Lions as an undrafted free agent in 2004. Wilson was a longtime player for the Buffalo Bills and also played for the Tennessee Titans.

== Early life ==
Wilson played high school football for Paducah Tilghman High School in Paducah, Kentucky. He twice was named all-state and was honorable mention All-America as a senior. He was also named all state in basketball, and lettered in baseball and track as well. During his high school football career, Wilson had 81 catches for 1,723 yards and 24 touchdowns. Wilson played in the Kentucky-Tennessee All-Star Game.

== College career ==
Wilson played at the University of Arkansas. He was a starter for three years at Arkansas and led the team in receptions for two of those years. He had at least one reception in 38 of his final 40 games. For his career, he played in 44 games, catching 144 passes for 2,151 yards (14.9 average) and 16 touchdowns. Wilson left Arkansas with the second most receptions in a career there (behind Anthony Eubanks) and he had the third highest total for receiving touchdowns and receiving yardage there (behind Eubanks and Anthony Lucas). He was only the 16th player in school history to gain over 1,000 yards receiving in a career. In 2002, he led the team with 49 catches for 626 yards and a career-high seven touchdowns, starting 11 of 14 games. In 2003, Wilson had four 100-yard receiving games, including a career-high 172 yards on nine receptions and a touchdown in the 71-63 seven overtime win at Kentucky. Over Wilson's four seasons at Arkansas, he helped the Hogs go to four consecutive bowl games, winning the 2003 Independence Bowl as a senior on a team that finished 9–4, as well as win a share of the 2002 SEC West Division Championship during his junior season on a team that finished 9–5.

== Professional career ==
=== Detroit Lions ===
Wilson was signed by the Detroit Lions on April 30, 2004, as an undrafted free agent.

=== Buffalo Bills ===
Wilson was signed by the Buffalo Bills to their practice squad on October 18, 2004, and played his first regular season game on September 11, 2005, against the Houston Texans. Up to the 2007 season, he had played in only three games in his NFL career and never recorded a reception. For the 2007 season, Wilson made the transition to strong safety, a position in which he had never played in an organized game.

On October 8, 2007, on Monday Night Football, he intercepted Tony Romo and returned it for a touchdown in his first NFL start. His 2007–2008 season ended with a rib injury on December 10, 2007, in a game against the Miami Dolphins in which he returned a fumble for a touchdown.

In the 2008 season, Wilson played in all 16 games for the first time in his career. He shared a sack of New England Patriots Matt Cassel with Marcus Stroud at New England on November 9, 2008. The play marked his first career participation in a sack. He also recovered the fumble forced by Stroud on the same play, marking his second career fumble recovery. Wilson had a season-high four tackles, including one for a loss of five yards, a sack, and recovered a fumble at KC. He finished third on the team with 15 special teams tackles. He was voted special teams captain prior to the season, and has been voted consecutively as team captain for seasons since.

Wilson is the first Buffalo Bills defensive back to post consecutive multi-sack seasons since Lawyer Milloy (2003–04) and only the second Bills defensive back to accomplish this feat.

On February 11, 2013, Wilson was released from the Bills, along with linebacker Nick Barnett.

=== Tennessee Titans ===
On February 22, 2013, Wilson was signed by the Tennessee Titans. He was later waived by the Titans.

=== Kentucky Pro Football Hall of Fame ===
Wilson was a part of the 2022 Induction to the Kentucky Pro Football Hall of Fame. This is the 20th anniversary of their Hall of Fame Inductions.

== Career statistics ==
NFL career statistics
Season				Tackling				Fumbles				Interceptions					
Year	Team	GP	GS	Comb	Solo	Asst	Sack	FF	FR	Yds	F-TD	Int	Yds	Avg	Lng	I-TD	PD
2005	BUF	15	03	02	02	0	0.0	0	0	0	0	0	0.0	0	0	0	0
2007	BUF	12	09	37	30	07	0.0	0	1	20	1	2	25	12.5	25	1	4
2008	BUF	16	03	25	20	05	1.5	0	2	0	0	0	0	0	0	0	0
2009	BUF	16	12	103	70	33	2.0	1	0	0	0	4	23	5.75	27	0	6
2010	BUF	16	02	35	26	09	0.0	1	1	0	0	2	65	32.5	56	0	4
2011	BUF	13	13	106	78	28	0.0	2	1	0	0	4	26	6.5	12	0	6
2012	BUF	16	16	104	79	25	0.0	0	0	0	0	0	0	0	0	0	5
2013	TEN	16	03	40	29	1	0.0	0	0	0	0	1	0	0	0	0	4
2014	TEN	16	10	73	57	16	1.0	0	0	0	0	1	0	0	0	0	4
Career		124	68	525	391	134	4.5	4	5	20	1	14	139	9.9	56	1	33

== Philanthropy ==
Wilson has been an active philanthropist both within his community and on a national scale to improve education for today's youth. In 2008, Wilson received the President's Volunteer Service Award, the highest service honor awarded by the White House. The following year, he founded his own foundation, the George Wilson S.A.F.E.T.Y. Foundation that aims to educate today's youth no matter what their background. Wilson has received the Buffalo Bills Walter Payton Man of the Year Award twice, once in 2009 and then again in 2011.

Recently, Wilson has increased his work with United Way. He became the regional Live United spokesperson for United Way of Buffalo and Erie County in 2010. He also serves as the Buffalo Bills representative for United Way Worldwide Team NFL, to recruit one million volunteer readers, tutors and mentors and cut the high school dropout rate in half by 2018.

In his native Paducah, Kentucky, Wilson also hosts an annual Summer SportsFest that benefits his former high school. He has also headed up a Life Skills Camping Retreat in Nashville to teach leadership, self-esteem and responsibility to youth. Wilson has also worked with Toys for Tots, and helped provide over 5,000 donations and gifts for families in his hometown.

The "George's Jungle" program is another initiative where Wilson personally donates 20 season tickets and meal vouchers to Buffalo Public High School students. For the first time in 2011, George served as a spokesperson for the Buffalo Bills Kids Escaping Drugs Campaign. With his teammates, Wilson assisted in helping raise over $8,000 for the organization. In addition, Wilson also mentored a group for 15 young men from a local community center in Buffalo through the "That's Life" Program in 2009 and still has a strong bond with each one of the boys. Wilson has also participated in the Night out with the Bills which is put on by the Buffalo Pro Ministry Athletes in Action. The players in attendance shared stories about their views on faith, signed autographs and posed for pictures with over 700 members of the Buffalo Community. Wilson was also the spokesman for the American Red Cross Blood Drives at Ralph Wilson Stadium in September and November 2010. With the help of George and the teams support, over 500 units of blood were collected, ultimately saving over 1,500 lives.

=== George Wilson S.A.F.E.T.Y. Foundation ===
The George Wilson S.A.F.E.T.Y. Foundation's mission is to Save Adolescents From the Everyday Trials of Youth by using life skills as a tool to educate youth on how to survive in different environments. Through programs such as the Leadership Retreat, Sports Fest Football Camp and the That's Life after-school program, the George Wilson S.A.F.E.T.Y. Foundation has impacted the lives of over 5,000 students within the Buffalo, NY and Paducah, KY School systems since its inception in 2009.

== screen career ==
In early 2010, Wilson performed opposite Mary J. Blige in her music video for the song "We Got Hood Love". He also performed opposite Marsha Ambrosius in her music video for the song "Late Nights & Early Mornings".

In 2025, Wilson joined the Buffalo Bills' multimedia department as a studio analyst for team-produced programs. In 2026, he was named co-host of a new pregame show designed to be watched by those attending games at Highmark Stadium in-person.
