= Bob Sanders (American football coach) =

American football coach (born 1953)

Appalachian State Mountaineers football
- Title: Senior defensive assistant

Personal information
- Born: December 5, 1953 (age 72); Jacksonville, North Carolina, U.S.

Career information
- College: Davidson (1972-1975)

Career history
- Southwest Onslow HS (NC) (1976–1978) Defensive coordinator; Georgia Tech (1979) Assistant defensive line coach; East Carolina (1980–1982) Defensive line coach & linebackers coach; Richmond (1983–1984) Linebackers coach; Duke (1985–1988) Outside linebackers coach & defensive ends coach; Duke (1989) Co-defensive coordinator & outside linebackers; Florida (1990) Defensive ends coach; Florida (1991–1993) Assistant defensive coordinator & banditbacks/gatorbacks coach; Florida (1994–1997) Assistant defensive coordinator & defensive ends; Florida (1998–1999) Assistant defensive coordinator, defensive ends coach & strong-side linebackers coach; Florida (2000) Assistant defensive coordinator & linebackers coach; Miami Dolphins (2001–2004) Linebackers coach; Green Bay Packers (2005) Defensive ends coach; Green Bay Packers (2006–2008) Defensive coordinator; Buffalo Bills (2009) Defensive line coach; Buffalo Bills (2010–2011) Outside linebackers coach; Buffalo Bills (2012) Linebackers coach; Oakland Raiders (2013–2014) Linebackers coach; Arizona Cardinals (2015–2017) Linebackers coach; Orlando Apollos (2019) Defensive coordinator; Tampa Bay Buccaneers (2022) Outside linebackers coach; Appalachian State (2025-present) Senior defensive assistant
- Coaching profile at Pro Football Reference

Bob Sanders (born December 5, 1953) is an American football coach who is currently a senior defensive assistant for Appalachian State. He coached the Buffalo Bills from 2009 to 2012 after coaching for four years with the Green Bay Packers, four years with the Miami Dolphins and 11 years at the University of Florida. He was let go by the Packers following the 2008 season.

Sanders was hired on January 29, 2009, by the Buffalo Bills as defensive line coach. He was dismissed, along with the entire Bills coaching staff on December 31, 2012. Sanders worked under Steve Spurrier for 11 years at Florida. He also worked at Miami under the veteran defensive coordinator Jim Bates for five years, from 2001 to 2004 coaching linebackers and, in 2005, as defensive ends coach in Green Bay.

On February 2, 2015, it was announced that Sanders had been hired as the linebackers coach with the Arizona Cardinals.

In 2019, Sanders reunited with Spurrier as the defensive coordinator of the Apollos.

On March 1, 2022, Sanders reunited with Arians as the outside linebackers coach for the Tampa Bay Buccaneers.
