= Marcus Buggs =

American football player (born 1985)

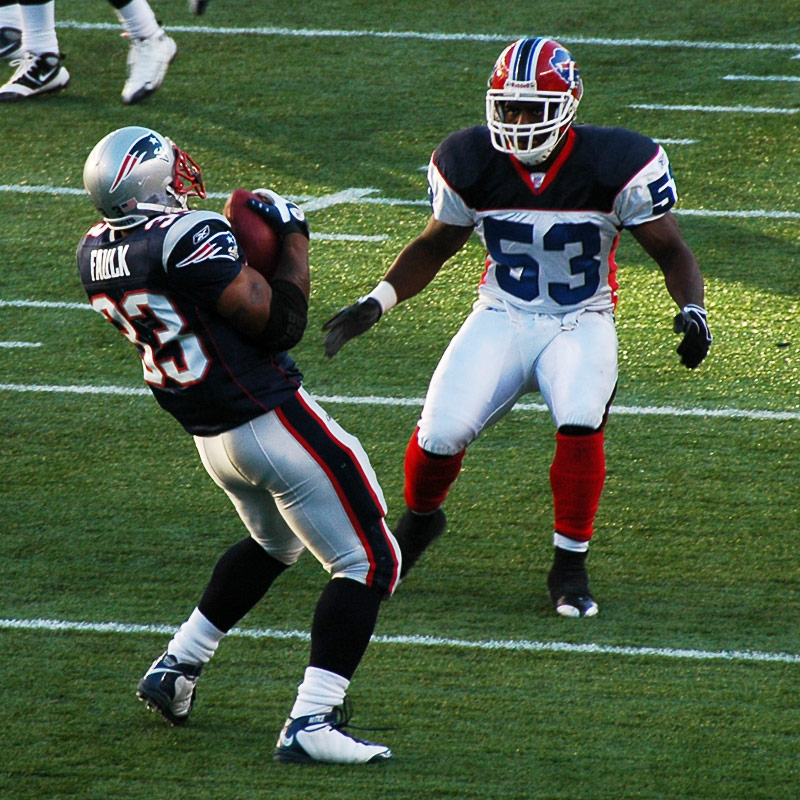
- Buggs (right) and Kevin Faulk in 2008.

No. 53
- Position: Linebacker

Personal information
- Born: September 21, 1985 (age 41); Nashville, Tennessee, U.S.
- Listed height: 5 ft 10 in (1.78 m)
- Listed weight: 223 lb (101 kg)

Career information
- High school: Goodpasture Christian School (Madison, Tennessee)
- College: Vanderbilt
- NFL draft: 2008: undrafted

Career history
- Buffalo Bills (2008–2009); Chicago Bears (2010)*
- * Offseason or practice squad member only

Career NFL statistics
- Tackles: 21
- Sacks: 0
- INTs: 0
- Stats at Pro Football Reference

Marcus Leon Buggs (born September 21, 1985) is an American former professional football player who was a linebacker in the National Football League (NFL). He was signed by the Buffalo Bills as an undrafted free agent in 2008. He played college football for the Vanderbilt Commodores.
