= Dick Jauron =

American football player and coach (1950–2025)

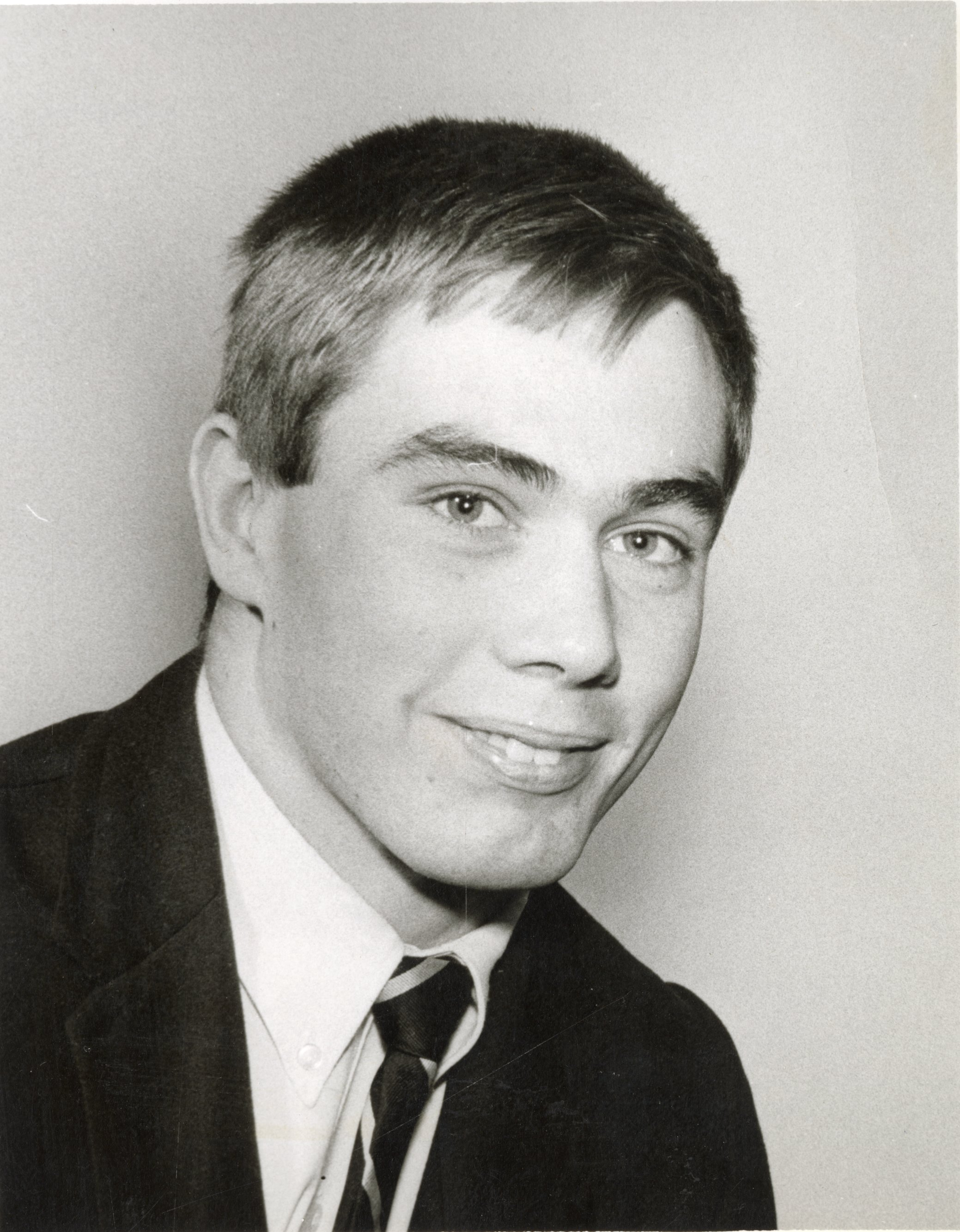
- Jauron with the Yale Bulldogs

No. 26, 30
- Position: Safety

Personal information
- Born: October 7, 1950; Peoria, Illinois, U.S.
- Died: February 8, 2025 (aged 74); Swampscott, Massachusetts, U.S.
- Listed height: 6 ft 0 in (1.83 m)
- Listed weight: 190 lb (86 kg)

Career information
- High school: Swampscott
- College: Yale (1970–1972)
- NFL draft: 1973: 4th round, 91st overall pick

Career history

Playing
- Detroit Lions (1973–1977); Cincinnati Bengals (1978–1980)

Coaching
- Buffalo Bills (1985) Defensive backs coach; Green Bay Packers (1986–1994) Defensive backs coach; Jacksonville Jaguars (1995–1998) Defensive coordinator; Chicago Bears (1999–2003) Head coach; Detroit Lions (2004–2005) Defensive coordinator; Detroit Lions (2005) Interim head coach; Buffalo Bills (2006–2009) Head coach; Philadelphia Eagles (2010) Senior assistant & defensive backs coach; Cleveland Browns (2011–2012) Defensive coordinator

Awards and highlights
- AP NFL Coach of the Year (2001); The Sporting News NFL Coach of the Year (2001); Pro Football Weekly NFL Coach of the Year (2001); Greasy Neale Award (2001); Pro Bowl (1974); First-team All-American (1972); Nils V. "Swede" Nelson Award (1971); First-team All-East (1972); 3× First-team All-Ivy League

Head coaching record
- Regular season: 60–82 (.423)
- Postseason: 0–1 (.000)
- Career: 60–83 (.420)
- Coaching profile at Pro Football Reference
- Stats at Pro Football Reference
- College Football Hall of Fame

Richard Manual Jauron (/dʒəˈrɒn/; October 7, 1950 – February 8, 2025) was an American professional football player and coach in the National Football League (NFL). He played eight seasons in the NFL as a safety, five with the Detroit Lions and three with the Cincinnati Bengals. Jauron served as the head coach of the Chicago Bears from 1999 to 2003 and the Buffalo Bills from 2006 until November 2009. He was also the interim head coach for the Lions for the final five games of the 2005 season. He was named the AP Coach of the Year in 2001 after leading the Bears to a 13–3 record.

Jauron played college football for the Yale Bulldogs. He was inducted into the College Football Hall of Fame in 2015. Jauron was selected a NFF Scholar Athlete in 1972.

== Playing career ==
=== Early life ===
Jauron was born in Peoria, Illinois. He attended grammar school in Rensselaer, Indiana, before his family moved to Lynn, Massachusetts. He attended Swampscott High School in Swampscott, Massachusetts, and was a letterman in football, basketball, and baseball. In football, he was a Parade All-American selection as a senior. He had been honored as one of the top ten all-time Massachusetts high school football players by The Boston Globe.

=== College ===
At Yale University, Jauron rushed for 2,947 yards in three seasons (freshmen were not eligible for the varsity team in the 1970s) for the Bulldogs, a record that stood until 2000, and was three times named to the All-Ivy League First-team, the first Yale football athlete to be so honored. His school-record streak of 16 consecutive 100-yard rushing games was not broken until 2006. Jauron was awarded the Nils V. "Swede" Nelson Award for sportsmanship following his junior season and the Bulger Lowe Award, given to the best Division I-A/I-AA player in New England, after his senior season. Jauron recorded the best rushing performance, 183 yards, in The Game his senior season.

At Yale Jauron was a three–time All–Ivy First-team selection in an era when freshmen were barred from playing varsity football, and a First-team All America selection during his senior year. He was also a three–time letter winner on Yale's varsity baseball team. Jauron won the 1972 Asa S. Bushnell Award as Ivy League Player of the Year in football. He is the only athlete to hold a berth in the College Football Hall of Fame, win the Asa S. Bushnell award, and claim selection as a NFF Scholar Athlete. In 1973, Jauron won the William Neely Mallory Award, the most prestigious athletic award given to a senior male at Yale.

=== Professional ===
After graduating from college, Jauron was selected 91st overall in the fourth round of the 1973 NFL draft by the Detroit Lions. He was also drafted as a shortstop by baseball's St. Louis Cardinals in the 25th round of the 1973 MLB draft. Jauron chose the NFL. and started at free safety as a rookie for the Lions. He was named to the 1975 Pro Bowl in his second season after leading the NFC in punt return average. Jauron played with the Lions for five seasons (1973–1977) and the Cincinnati Bengals for three seasons (1978–1980). He finished his playing career with 25 interceptions and two touchdowns.

== Coaching career ==
=== Early coaching career ===
Jauron began his coaching career in the NFL in 1985 as the Buffalo Bills defensive backs coach. He was offered the position by Bills defensive coordinator Hank Bullough, who was the Bengals defensive coordinator when Jauron was a player.

After one season with the Bills, Jauron was named the defensive backs coach for the Green Bay Packers. He worked with the team for eight seasons, serving under three different head coaches: Forrest Gregg, Lindy Infante, and Mike Holmgren.

Jauron became the defensive coordinator for the expansion Jacksonville Jaguars in 1995 at the invitation of then-Jaguars head coach Tom Coughlin, whom he coached with at Green Bay. The Jaguars made the playoffs in three of Jauron's four seasons with the team, including an appearance in the 1996 AFC Championship Game.

Following his first head-coaching job, Jauron served as the defensive coordinator for the Detroit Lions in 2004 and the first 11 games of the 2005 season before being named the team's interim head coach.

=== Chicago Bears ===
Jauron became the 12th head coach in Chicago Bears history on January 23, 1999, when he was hired to replace Dave Wannstedt, who was fired after two consecutive 4–12 seasons. Jauron coached the Bears for five seasons (1999–2003), finishing with a 35–45 regular season record and one playoff appearance. In his first two seasons, the Bears finished last in the NFC Central with 6–10 and 5–11 records. Jauron, however, turned the team around in his third season as head coach, accumulating more wins in that season than he had the previous two combined. In their 13–3 2001 campaign, Chicago finished 8–0 in games decided by seven points or less, including back-to-back overtime victories. Jauron was named the 2001 AP Coach of the Year and became the third coach in team history to record at least 13 wins in a season, joining George Halas and Mike Ditka, and eventually joined by his successor Lovie Smith. After earning their first division title in 11 years, however, Chicago lost a home game to the Philadelphia Eagles, 33–19, in the NFC Divisional Playoffs. The Bears did not return to the playoffs under Jauron, finishing 4–12 and 7–9 in his last two seasons with the team. He was fired by the Bears after the 2003 season and replaced by Lovie Smith.

=== Detroit Lions ===
Jauron was then, prior to the 2004 season, hired by the Detroit Lions as a defensive coordinator. He was promoted to interim head coach of the Lions on November 28, 2005, after the mid-season firing of Steve Mariucci. Detroit was 4–7 when Jauron took over and won only one of their last five games, finishing the season 5–11. Although Jauron was one of many candidates who interviewed for the head coaching position after the season, he was passed over for Rod Marinelli.

=== Buffalo Bills ===
Jauron was named the 14th head coach in Buffalo Bills history on January 23, 2006, following the resignation of Mike Mularkey. He led the Bills to three consecutive 7–9 records, finishing respectively third, second and fourth in the AFC East. In 2008 the team started 5–1, but ended the season on a 2–8 skid. Bills owner Ralph Wilson announced on December 30, 2008, that Jauron would be brought back for the 2009 season despite the expiration of his three-year contract. On the morning of September 4, 2009, Jauron fired his offensive coordinator, Turk Schonert, in a morning meeting before the regular season began. Two different viewpoints emerged, Jauron stating in a press conference the reason for his firing was a "lack of productivity", while Schonert claimed that Jauron told him that he "had too many formations, too many plays", and that he "didn't simplify it to his liking." Schonert was replaced the same day by former Buffalo Bills quarterback and then quarterbacks coach Alex Van Pelt. On November 17, 2009, Jauron was fired by the Bills after starting the season 3–6. He ended his tenure with the Bills with an overall record of 24–33.

=== Philadelphia Eagles ===
On February 3, 2010, Jauron was hired by the Philadelphia Eagles as a senior assistant and defensive backs coach.

=== Cleveland Browns ===
On January 21, 2011, Jauron was named defensive coordinator by the Cleveland Browns. He replaced Rob Ryan, who then became defensive coordinator for the Dallas Cowboys. On January 18, 2013, newly hired head coach Rob Chudzinski hired Ray Horton as defensive coordinator, subsequently firing Jauron 10 days later.

== Personal life and death ==
Jauron and his wife Gail had two daughters, Kacy and Amy.

Jauron died from cancer on February 8, 2025, at the age of 74.

== Head coaching record ==
Team	Year	Regular season					Postseason			
Team	Year	Won	Lost	Ties	Win %	Finish	Won	Lost	Win %	Result
CHI	1999	6	10	0	.375	5th in NFC Central	–	–	–	–
CHI	2000	5	11	0	.313	5th in NFC Central	–	–	–	–
CHI	2001	13	3	0	.813	1st in NFC Central	0	1	.000	Lost to Philadelphia Eagles in NFC Divisional Game
CHI	2002	4	12	0	.250	3rd in NFC North	–	–	–	–
CHI	2003	7	9	0	.438	3rd in NFC North	–	–	–	–
CHI total		35	45	0	.438		–	–	–	–
DET	2005*	1	4	0	.200	3rd in NFC North	–	–	–	–
DET total		1	4	0	.400		–	–	–	–
BUF	2006	7	9	0	.438	3rd in AFC East	–	–	–	–
BUF	2007	7	9	0	.438	2nd in AFC East	–	–	–	–
BUF	2008	7	9	0	.438	4th in AFC East	–	–	–	–
BUF	2009	3	6	0	.333	Fired	–	–	–	–
BUF total		24	33	0	.421		–	–	–	–
Total		60	82	0	.423		0	1	.000	

*Interim head coach
