= Bryan Scott =

American football player (born 1981)

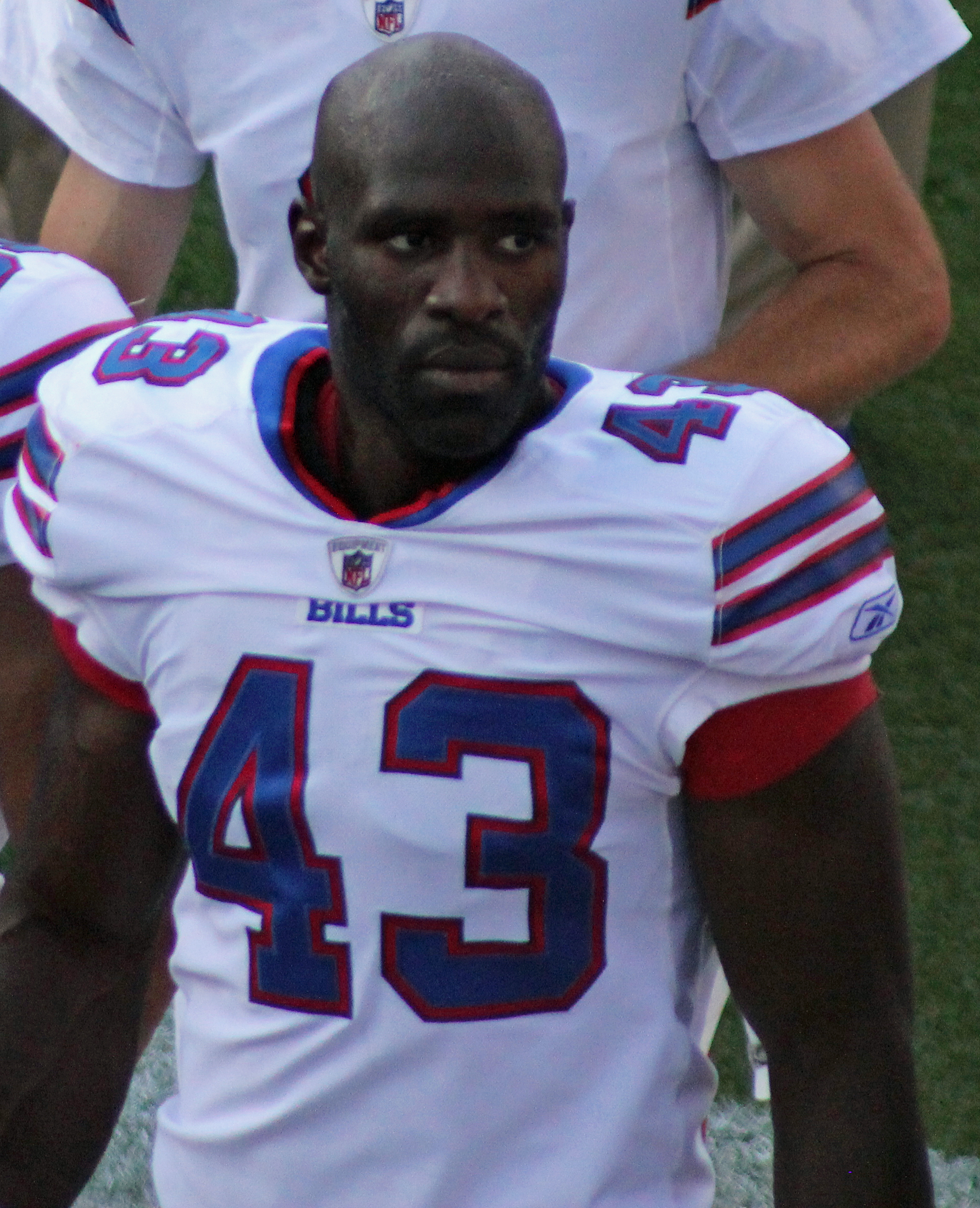
- Scott with the Buffalo Bills in 2011

No. 24, 43
- Positions: Linebacker, safety

Personal information
- Born: April 13, 1981 (age 45); Washington, D.C., U.S.
- Listed height: 6 ft 1 in (1.85 m)
- Listed weight: 210 lb (95 kg)

Career information
- High school: Central Bucks East (Buckingham, Pennsylvania)
- College: Penn State
- NFL draft: 2003: 2nd round, 55th overall pick

Career history
- Atlanta Falcons (2003–2005); New Orleans Saints (2006); Tennessee Titans (2007)*; Buffalo Bills (2007–2012)
- * Offseason or practice squad member only

Awards and highlights
- Walter Payton Man of the Year Award (2012)

Career NFL statistics
- Total tackles: 592
- Sacks: 10.5
- Forced fumbles: 9
- Fumble recoveries: 9
- Interceptions: 11
- Defensive touchdowns: 2
- Stats at Pro Football Reference

Bryan Anderson Scott (born April 13, 1981) is an American former professional football player who was a linebacker and safety in the National Football League (NFL). He played college football for the Penn State Nittany Lions and was selected by the Atlanta Falcons in the second round of the 2003 NFL draft. Scott was also a member of the New Orleans Saints, Tennessee Titans and Buffalo Bills.

== Early life ==
Scott was a three-sport standout at Central Bucks East High School in Buckingham Township, Bucks County, Pennsylvania. He was a consensus first-team All-American and was named the Associated Press Pennsylvania Big School Player of the Year and the USA Today Pennsylvania Player of the Year his senior year, rushing for more than 3,000 career yards and 53 tackles with three interceptions as a senior defensive back.

He averaged nearly 20 points per game in basketball as a senior and was a Pennsylvania state prep medalist in the 100- and 200-meter dashes.

== College career ==
He was a three-year starter at Penn State University, playing in all 48 career games, and finished his career with 202 tackles, five interceptions, a fumble recovery and a forced fumble. Bryan played for head coach Joe Paterno. He played in the 2003 Senior Bowl. During his NFL Pro Day workout, Bryan ran a 4.34 40-yard dash.

He graduated from Penn State in 2003 with a Bachelor of Science in Recreation and Parks Management. He participated in the university's study abroad program in Fiji.

== Professional career ==
=== Atlanta Falcons ===
Scott was selected in the second round of the 2003 NFL draft (55th overall) by the Atlanta Falcons.

In his rookie season, Scott led all defensive backs with 63 tackles despite only starting six contests in 15 total games; he finished that season tied for the team lead among special-teams players with 13 tackles.

In 2004, he started all 16 games at strong safety and ranked third on the team with 85 tackles and 2.5 sacks, and one interception, including 7 tackles in the NFC Championship Game against the Philadelphia Eagles. He registered 54 tackles, a sack and an interception in 16 games during the 2005 season.

=== New Orleans Saints ===
On April 6, 2006, Scott was traded to the New Orleans Saints for offensive tackle Wayne Gandy and a 2007 conditional late round draft choice.

=== Tennessee Titans ===
On March 26, 2007, Scott signed with the Titans. On September 1, 2007, the Titans released him.

=== Buffalo Bills ===
He signed with the Buffalo Bills on September 12, 2007. A free agent in the 2008 offseason, the Bills re-signed Scott on March 18. Following injuries to Kawika Mitchell and Keith Ellison in the middle of the 2009 season, Scott was moved to outside linebacker. Scott responded with 10 solo tackles and a sack against Kansas City in week 14. Scott was the recipient of the Buffalo Bills Walter Payton Man of the Year award during the 2012 season. On March 7, 2013, Scott re-signed with the Bills. Scott was released by the Bills during team cuts on August 31, 2013. He later retired after his release.

== NFL statistics ==
| Year | Team | Games | | Tackles | | | | Fumbles | | | Interceptions | | | | | |
| Year | Team | G | GS | Comb | Total | Ast | Sack | FF | FR | Yds | Int | Yds | Avg | Lng | TD | PD |
|---|---|---|---|---|---|---|---|---|---|---|---|---|---|---|---|---|
| 2003 | ATL | 15 | 6 | 65 | 57 | 8 | 0.0 | 3 | 1 | 0 | 2 | 3 | 1.5 | 3 | 0 | 6 |
| 2004 | ATL | 16 | 16 | 96 | 85 | 11 | 2.5 | 1 | 1 | 1 | 1 | 22 | 22 | 22 | 0 | 5 |
| 2005 | ATL | 16 | 13 | 67 | 54 | 13 | 1.0 | 0 | 1 | 0 | 1 | 15 | 15 | 15 | 0 | 7 |
| 2006 | NO | 9 | 0 | 15 | 12 | 3 | 0.0 | 1 | 0 | 0 | 0 | 0 | 0 | 0 | 0 | 1 |
| 2007 | BUF | 15 | 2 | 28 | 21 | 7 | 0.0 | 1 | 0 | 0 | 0 | 0 | 0 | 0 | 0 | 1 |
| 2008 | BUF | 16 | 7 | 68 | 55 | 13 | 1.0 | 1 | 1 | 0 | 0 | 0 | 0 | 0 | 0 | 7 |
| 2009 | BUF | 9 | 9 | 81 | 58 | 23 | 2.0 | 1 | 0 | 0 | 1 | 27 | 27 | 27 | 0 | 3 |
| 2010 | BUF | 15 | 1 | 39 | 28 | 11 | 3.0 | 1 | 2 | 17 | 0 | 0 | 0 | 0 | 0 | 5 |
| 2011 | BUF | 16 | 7 | 66 | 51 | 15 | 1.0 | 0 | 1 | 0 | 2 | 43 | 21.5 | 43 | 1 | 6 |
| 2012 | BUF | 16 | 1 | 66 | 47 | 19 | 0.0 | 1 | 2 | 8 | 4 | 66 | 16.5 | 32 | 1 | 8 |
| Career | | 143 | 62 | 591 | 468 | 123 | 10.5 | 10 | 9 | 26 | 11 | 176 | 16 | 43 | 2 | 44 |

== Personal life ==
Bryan is married to Maisha Scott. The two were married in Atlanta, Georgia. Bryan appeared on the CNBC TV show Shark Tank to pitch his Noene shoe insoles. Daymond John and Mark Cuban gave him $200,000 in exchange for 30% of his company.

=== Music and acting ===
He sings and plays the piano, drums and saxophone. He participated in the ABC Monday Night Football's musical competition called "Monday Night at the Mic" in 2003 paired with Grammy Award winning artist Michelle Branch. The duo lost to Doug Flutie and Barenaked Ladies in the finals after competing against a host of other NFL players and recording artists in a round-robin competition. Bryan also had a major role in the feature film White Men Can't Rap where he played the drummer Tater in the rap group Cocoa Bean Mogul.

Scott sang a song he wrote at the funeral service for Kevin Dare, the Penn State pole vaulter who died while competing at the Big Ten Indoor Track and Field Championships in February 2002.

=== In other areas ===
His brother, Brandon Scott, is a digital marketing executive with Ten Adams in Evansville, Indiana.

His cousin, Ryan Stewart, is a former defensive back with the Detroit Lions (1996–99) and current radio personality in Atlanta, Georgia.

He is the inspiration for the Twitter hashtag #allhedoesismakeplays, for his knack of making key plays during his playing time for the Buffalo Bills.

After football, Bryan became co-owner of Noene America, a company that manufactures and sells insoles. He appeared on the April 24, 2015, episode of the television show Shark Tank, and made a deal with Mark Cuban and Daymond John for them to become involved in the company. They offered and Scott accepted $200,000 for 30% equity in Noene USA.

NOENE USA was acquired by Foot Solutions Inc. in 2020.
