= 2010 New England Patriots season =

51st season in franchise history

- Owner: Robert Kraft
- Head coach: Bill Belichick
- Home stadium: Gillette Stadium

Results
- Record: 14–2
- Division place: 1st AFC East
- Playoffs: Lost Divisional Playoffs (vs. Jets) 21–28
- All-Pros: 6: QB Tom Brady (1st team); G Logan Mankins (1st team); ILB Jerod Mayo (1st team); T Sebastian Vollmer (2nd team); DT Vince Wilfork (2nd team); CB Devin McCourty (2nd team)
- Pro Bowlers: 8: QB Tom Brady; WR Wes Welker; T Matt Light; G Logan Mankins; DT Vince Wilfork; ILB Jerod Mayo; CB Devin McCourty; FS Brandon Meriweather

Uniform
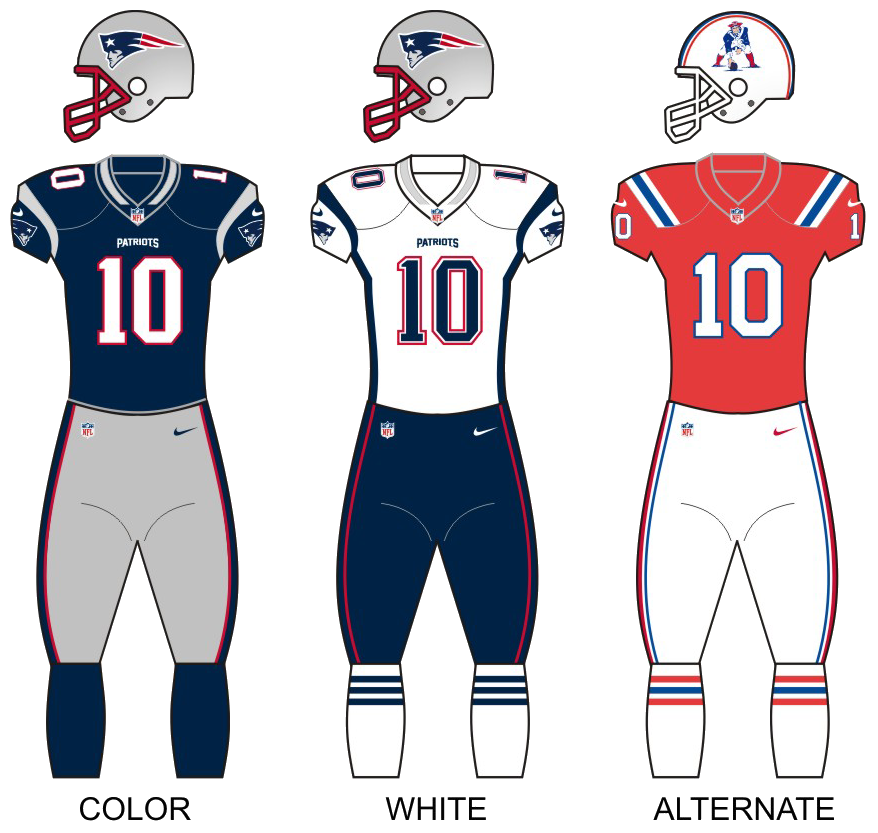

The 2010 season was the New England Patriots' 41st in the National Football League (NFL) and their 51st overall. The Patriots improved on their 10–6 record from 2009 by finishing with a league-best 14–2 record and clinching the top seed in the AFC, before losing to the New York Jets in the playoffs.

After losing to the Baltimore Ravens at home in the first round of the 2009 playoffs, the Patriots went into the 2010 season without either an offensive or defensive coordinator following the departure of defensive coordinator Dean Pees. An October 6 trade sent All-Pro wide receiver Randy Moss to the Minnesota Vikings, and eventually led to the return of wide receiver Deion Branch from the Seattle Seahawks in a separate deal. After acquiring Branch, the Patriots won 11 of their last 12 games of the season to finish with a 14–2 record and homefield advantage throughout the playoffs. Quarterback Tom Brady finished the regular season with an NFL-record 335 consecutive pass attempts without an interception, and broke his own 2007 TD to INT ratio record with 9:1 and was named NFL MVP. The Patriots committed an NFL-record low 10 turnovers on the season, setting an NFL record with seven consecutive games without a turnover.

In their Divisional playoff game against the Jets, the Patriots could not recover from a 14–3 halftime deficit, and were held to their lowest scoring total in their last 11 weeks, dropping the contest 28–21 to the underdog Jets.

Statistics site Football Outsiders calculated that the Patriots 2010 offense was not only more efficient, play-for-play, than their record-setting 2007 offense, but was actually the best offense they calculated in their history.

This was the last season until 2018 in which the Patriots did not play the Denver Broncos during the regular season.

This was the last time the Patriots went one–and–done in the postseason until 2019, as well as the last time they failed to make the AFC championship game until that same season. It was, however, the first of 9 consecutive seasons through 2018 in which the Patriots always secured a first-round bye in the playoffs.

== Offseason ==
=== Staff changes ===
Four days after the Patriots' playoff loss against the Baltimore Ravens, defensive coordinator Dean Pees announced that he would not seek to renew his contract, which expired at the end of the 2009 season. He was named the Ravens' linebackers coach on January 26. The Patriots did not name a formal replacement for defensive coordinator. The team did, however, add former defensive back and Notre Dame defensive coordinator Corwin Brown as a defensive backs coach, which was later clarified to mean Brown would coach the team's safeties, alongside existing defensive backs coach Josh Boyer. Additionally, tight ends coach Shane Waldron left the team following the season and later joined the coaching staff of the Hartford Colonials of the United Football League. No formal replacement was named.

In the personnel department, pro scout Brian Smith was named assistant director of college scouting.

=== Departures ===
On the eve of the start of the free agent signing period, the Patriots released tight end Chris Baker, who had signed a five-year deal the year before. The team also lost two unrestricted free agents: defensive end Jarvis Green signed with the Denver Broncos, while tight end Benjamin Watson joined the Cleveland Browns. On April 26, the team released veteran linebacker Adalius Thomas after three seasons with the team. Weeks later, the Patriots released veteran cornerback Shawn Springs after one year with the team.

On September 14, after the Patriots' first game of the season, running back Laurence Maroney was traded to the Denver Broncos along with a sixth-round selection in the 2011 NFL draft in exchange for the Broncos' fourth-round pick in 2011.

In the week leading up to the Patriots' 2010 season opener against the Cincinnati Bengals, Randy Moss, who was entering the final year of his contract told CBS Sports that he "did not feel wanted" in New England absent a contract extension offer. After the game, Moss told reporters that it would be his final season with the Patriots. The Boston Herald reported weeks later that Moss requested a trade following the game. Two days after the Patriots' Week 4 game against the Miami Dolphins, Moss was traded to the Minnesota Vikings in exchange for the Vikings' third-round selection in the 2011 NFL draft. The Patriots also sent a 2012 seventh-round selection to the Vikings as part of the trade.

=== Arrivals ===
Three days before the deadline for doing so, the Patriots assigned the non-exclusive franchise tag to unrestricted free agent nose tackle Vince Wilfork, while expressing their desire to reach a long-term contract with Wilfork. On March 5, the first day of free agency, the Patriots re-signed Wilfork to a five-year, $40 million contract with $25 million in guaranteed money.

Before the start of free agency, the Patriots signed wide receiver David Patten, who was with the team from 2001 until 2004 but had spent the 2009 season out of football. They also signed unrestricted free agents linebacker Marques Murrell and tight end Alge Crumpler, as well as defensive linemen Damione Lewis and Gerard Warren, and wide receiver Torry Holt, who were all released by their former teams (though Holt would never play for the team as he was sent to IR in August and retired shortly after). The Patriots also signed former Australian rules football player David King as a punter.

The Patriots also re-signed a number of their own unrestricted free agents. Linebacker Tully Banta-Cain was re-signed to a three-year contract, while guard Stephen Neal signed a two-year contract. Cornerback Leigh Bodden, running back Kevin Faulk, and linebacker Derrick Burgess were also re-signed. Restricted free agents Stephen Gostkowski and Pierre Woods were re-signed; Gostkowski was later re-signed to a four-year extension before the season. Restricted free agent running back Chris Taylor was not offered a tender, making him an unrestricted free agent, but he was later re-signed. Exclusive rights free agent linebacker Gary Guyton signed a two-year contract through 2011; while fellow exclusive-rights free agent safety Bret Lockett also re-signed.

Guard Logan Mankins became a restricted free agent under the terms of the NFL-NFLPA collective bargaining agreement, which entered its final, uncapped year; Mankins otherwise would have been an unrestricted free agent in a normal season. The Patriots tendered at the highest possible level for a restricted free agent, $3.26 million, which have required any team signing Mankins in the restricted free agent signing period, which ended on April 15, 2010, to surrender first- and third-round draft selections to the Patriots. On June 15, with Mankins yet to sign his tender, the Patriots were able to lower Mankins' tender amount to 110% of his prior year salary, or $1.54 million. The Patriots did so, and Mankins, who was looking for a long-term contract, reacted by publicly asking for a trade. He did not attend the Patriots' mandatory June minicamp, which he was not required to attend as he was not under contract at the time. Mankins remained unsigned through the team's training camp, preseason, and the start of the regular season. Mankins reported to the Patriots and signed his tender on November 2, in advance of the team's Week 9 game against the Cleveland Browns. He did not have to report until Week 12 in order to be on the roster for the necessary six games to earn his sixth accrued season of free agency credit. The NFL granted the Patriots a two-game roster exemption for Mankins upon his reporting. However, the Patriots activated Mankins on November 6, before using either game of the exemption.

On August 23, the Patriots acquired offensive lineman Quinn Ojinnaka from the Atlanta Falcons in exchange for a seventh-round selection in the 2011 NFL draft.

On September 4, the day the team was required to cut down to 53 players, they acquired linebacker Tracy White and a 2012 seventh-round selection from the Philadelphia Eagles for a 2012 sixth-round selection, as well as safety Jarrad Page from the Kansas City Chiefs for an unannounced draft selection.

Nearly a week after a trade sent wide receiver Randy Moss out of New England, the Patriots traded a 2011 fourth-round selection to the Seattle Seahawks for receiver Deion Branch. Branch played for the Patriots from 2002–2005 and was the MVP of the team's Super Bowl XXXIX win.

=== 2010 NFL draft ===
The Patriots traded their original fifth-round pick (#153 overall) to the Tampa Bay Buccaneers in April 2009 in exchange for tight end Alex Smith. In August 2009, the Patriots traded their original third- and fourth-round selections (#85 and No. 119 overall) to the Oakland Raiders in exchange for defensive end Derrick Burgess. The trade was made on the condition that, because the Patriots had already traded their fifth-round selection, the fourth-round selection sent to Oakland would become a fifth-round selection once the Patriots re-acquired one. Later that month, the Patriots traded defensive lineman Le Kevin Smith along with a seventh-round pick (#231) previously acquired from the Philadelphia Eagles to the Denver Broncos in exchange for the Broncos' fifth-round pick (#158 overall), which was sent to Oakland for the Patriots' original fourth-round pick (#119 overall). The Patriots then re-acquired the seventh-round pick that had been sent to Denver in the Le Kevin Smith trade in exchange for offensive lineman Russ Hochstein.

The Patriots traded a conditional seventh-round pick to the Baltimore Ravens for linebacker Prescott Burgess in September 2009. He was waived by the Patriots six days later. Since the trade was conditioned on Burgess being active for a certain number of games, and since Burgess was inactive in the only game for which he was with the Patriots, the Patriots kept the pick.

2010 New England Patriots draft
Round	Pick	Player	Position	College	Notes
1	27	Devin McCourty *	Cornerback	Rutgers	from Dallas (Note: The Patriots traded a first-round selection (#24 overall) and a fourth-round selection (#119 overall) to the Dallas Cowboys for the Cowboys' first-round pick (#27 overall) and third-round pick (#90 overall). The Patriots received the No. 24 overall pick with a 2010 fourth-round pick (#113 overall) in a trade with the Denver Broncos for the Patriots' 2010 first-round pick (#22 overall).)
2	42	Rob Gronkowski *	Tight end	Arizona	from Chicago via Tampa Bay and Oakland (Note: The Patriots traded a second-round selection (#44 overall) and a sixth-round selection (#190 overall) to the Oakland Raiders for the Raiders' second-round pick (#42 overall). The Patriots received the No. 44 overall pick with a 2009 seventh-round pick (#232 overall) in a trade with the Jacksonville Jaguars for the Jaguars' third-round selection (#73 overall) in the 2009 NFL draft. The Patriots received the No. 73 overall pick with a 2009 third-round pick (#83 overall) and a second-round pick (#41 overall) in a trade with the Green Bay Packers for the Patriots' 2009 first- and fifth-round picks (#26 and No. 162 overall). (The Patriots received the first- and fifth-round picks (#26 and No. 162 overall) in a trade with the Baltimore Ravens for the Patriots' 2009 first-round selection (#23 overall).)
2	53	Jermaine Cunningham	Linebacker	Florida	
2	62	Brandon Spikes	Linebacker	Florida	from Minnesota via Houston (Note: The Patriots traded a second-round selection (#58 overall) to the Houston Texans for the Texans' second-round pick (#62 overall) and fifth-round pick (#150 overall). The Patriots received the No. 58 overall pick with a third-round pick (#89 overall) in a trade with the Arizona Cardinals for the Patriots' second-round pick (#47 overall). (The Patriots received the No. 47 overall pick in a trade with the Tennessee Titans for the Titans' third-round pick (#89 overall) in the 2009 NFL draft.))
3	90	Taylor Price	Wide Receiver	Ohio	from Dallas
4	113	Aaron Hernandez	Tight end	Florida	from San Francisco via Denver
5	150	Zoltan Mesko	Punter	Michigan	from Houston
6	205	Ted Larsen	Center	NC State	compensatory selection
7	208	Thomas Welch	Offensive tackle	Vanderbilt	from St. Louis via Washington (Note: The Patriots traded two seventh-round selections (#229 and No. 231 overall) to the Washington Redskins for the Redskins' seventh-round selection (#208 overall). (The Patriots received the No. 231 overall pick with wide receiver Greg Lewis in a trade with the Philadelphia Eagles for the Eagles' fifth-round pick (#159 overall) in the 2009 NFL draft.))
7	247	Brandon Deaderick	Defensive end	Alabama	compensatory selection
7	248	Kade Weston	Defensive tackle	Georgia	compensatory selection
7	250	Zac Robinson	Quarterback	Oklahoma State	compensatory selection
Made roster * Made at least one Pro Bowl during career

2010 New England Patriots Draft Day Trades
Round	Overall	Team	Received
1	22	to Denver Broncos	Received Denver's first-round pick and fourth-round pick (24 and 113 overall)
1	24	to Dallas Cowboys	Received Dallas' first-round pick and third-round pick (27 and 90 overall)
4	119	to Dallas Cowboys	Received Dallas' first-round pick and third-round pick (27 and 90 overall)
2	44	to Oakland Raiders	Received Oakland's second-round pick (42 overall)
6	190	to Oakland Raiders	Received Oakland's second-round pick (42 overall)
2	47	to Arizona Cardinals	Received Arizona's second-round pick and third-round pick (58 and 89 overall)
2	58	to Houston Texans	Received Houston's second-round pick and fifth-round pick (62 and 150 overall)
3	89	to Carolina Panthers	Received Carolina's 2011 second-round pick
7	229	to Washington Redskins	Received Washington's seventh-round pick (208 overall)
7	231	to Washington Redskins	Received Washington's seventh-round pick (208 overall)

=== Undrafted free agents ===
Name	Position	College
Sergio Brown	Safety	Notre Dame
Buddy Farnham	Wide receiver	Brown
Dane Fletcher	Linebacker	Montana State
Terrence Johnson	Cornerback	California (PA)
Kyle Love	Nose tackle	Mississippi State
Ross Ventrone	Safety	Villanova
John Wise	Guard	

== Staff ==
2010 New England Patriots staff
Front office: Chairman/CEO – Robert Kraft; President – Jonathan Kraft; Senior football advisor – Floyd Reese; Director of player personnel – Nick Caserio; Director of college scouting – Jon Robinson; Director of pro personnel – Jason Licht; Assistant director of pro personnel – Bob Quinn; Assistant director of college scouting – Brian Smith; Football research director – Ernie Adams; Head coaches: Head coach – Bill Belichick; Assistant head coach/offensive line – Dante Scarnecchia; Offensive coaches: Quarterbacks – Bill O'Brien; Running backs – Ivan Fears; Wide receivers – Chad O'Shea; Offensive assistant – Brian Ferentz; Offensive assistant/special teams – Brian Flores	Defensive coaches: Defensive line – Pepper Johnson; Linebackers – Matt Patricia; Defensive backs – Josh Boyer; Defensive backs – Corwin Brown; Defensive assistant – Patrick Graham; Special teams coaches: Special teams – Scott O'Brien; Strength and conditioning: Strength and conditioning – Mike Woicik; Assistant strength and conditioning – Harold Nash

== Opening training camp roster ==
As of the Patriots' first training camp practice at Gillette Stadium on July 29, they had one fewer than the NFL maximum of 79 players signed to their roster. Restricted free agent Logan Mankins did not count against that limit, as he had yet to sign his tender. Derrick Burgess was placed on the Reserve/Did Not Report list and did not count against the limit.

New England Patriots 2010 opening training camp roster
Quarterbacks: 12 Tom Brady; 8 Brian Hoyer; 7 Zac Robinson ^{R}; Running backs: 35 Thomas Clayton; 33 Kevin Faulk; 42 BenJarvus Green-Ellis; 39 Laurence Maroney; 34 Sammy Morris; 29 Chris Taylor; 21 Fred Taylor; Wide receivers: 11 Julian Edelman PR; 13 Buddy Farnham ^{UR}; 84 Torry Holt; 81 Randy Moss; 86 David Patten; 17 Taylor Price ^{R}; 18 Matthew Slater; 19 Brandon Tate KR; Tight ends: 82 Alge Crumpler; 87 Rob Gronkowski ^{R}; 85 Aaron Hernandez ^{R}; 80 Rob Myers	Offensive linemen: 66 George Bussey T/G; 63 Dan Connolly G/C; 77 Nick Kaczur T/G; 67 Dan Koppen C; 62 Ted Larsen C/G ^{R}; 64 Mark LeVoir T; 72 Matt Light T; 61 Stephen Neal G; 60 Rich Ohrnberger G/C; 76 Sebastian Vollmer T; 74 Thomas Welch T ^{R}; 69 Ryan Wendell C/G; 71 John Wise G ^{UR}; Defensive linemen: 71 Brandon Deaderick DE ^{R}; 65 Adrian Grady NT/DE; 92 Damione Lewis DE; 74 Kyle Love NT ^{UR}; 91 Myron Pryor NT; 90 Darryl Richard DE; 68 Gerard Warren DE/NT; 94 Ty Warren DE; 66 Kade Weston DE ^{R}; 75 Vince Wilfork NT; 99 Mike Wright DE/NT	Linebackers: 52 Eric Alexander ILB; 95 Tully Banta-Cain OLB/DE; 96 Jermaine Cunningham OLB/DE ^{R}; 45 Dane Fletcher ILB ^{UR}; 59 Gary Guyton ILB; 51 Jerod Mayo ILB; 44 Tyrone McKenzie ILB; 93 Marques Murrell OLB; 50 Rob Ninkovich OLB/DE; 55 Brandon Spikes ILB ^{R}; 48 Thomas Williams ILB/FB; 58 Pierre Woods OLB; Defensive backs: 27 Kyle Arrington CB; 23 Leigh Bodden CB; 38 Sergio Brown SS ^{UR}; 28 Darius Butler CB; 25 Patrick Chung SS; 43 Terrence Johnson CB ^{UR}; 26 Bret Lockett FS; 32 Devin McCourty CB ^{R}; 30 Brandon McGowan FS; 31 Brandon Meriweather FS; 36 James Sanders SS; 41 Ross Ventrone FS ^{UR}; 22 Terrence Wheatley CB; 24 Jonathan Wilhite CB; Special teams: 3 Stephen Gostkowski K; 47 Jake Ingram LS; 14 Zoltan Mesko P ^{R}	Reserve lists: 88 Sam Aiken WR (active/NF-Inj.); 97 Ron Brace DE/NT (active/NF-Inj.); 53 Derrick Burgess OLB/DE (did not report); 10 Darnell Jenkins WR (active/NF-Inj.); 83 Wes Welker WR (active/PUP); Restricted FAs: 70 Logan Mankins G; Notations: R: 2010 rookie; UR: 2010 undrafted rookie; Italicized players are not on the 80-man roster.

== Schedule ==
=== Preseason ===
Week	Kickoff	Date	Opponent	Result	Record	Game Site	TV	NFL.com Recap
1	7:30 pm EDT	August 12	New Orleans Saints	W 27–24	1–0	Gillette Stadium	WBZ	Recap
2	8:00 pm EDT	August 19	at Atlanta Falcons	W 28–10	2–0	Georgia Dome	Fox	Recap
3	7:30 pm EDT	August 26	St. Louis Rams	L 35–36	2–1	Gillette Stadium	WBZ	Recap
4	7:00 pm EDT	September 2	at New York Giants	L 17–20	2–2	New Meadowlands Stadium	WBZ	Recap

=== Regular season ===
Week	Kickoff	Date	Opponent	Result	Record	Game Site	TV	NFL.com Recap
1	1:00 pm EDT	September 12	Cincinnati Bengals	W 38–24	1–0	Gillette Stadium	CBS	Recap
2	4:15 pm EDT	September 19	at New York Jets	L 14–28	1–1	New Meadowlands Stadium	CBS	Recap
3	1:00 pm EDT	September 26	Buffalo Bills	W 38–30	2–1	Gillette Stadium	CBS	Recap
4	8:30 pm EDT	October 4	at Miami Dolphins	W 41–14	3–1	Sun Life Stadium	ESPN (Note: Simulcast on WCVB-TV and WMUR-TV.)	Recap
5	Bye							
6	1:00 pm EDT	October 17	Baltimore Ravens	W 23–20 (OT)	4–1	Gillette Stadium	CBS	Recap
7	4:15 pm EDT	October 24	at San Diego Chargers	W 23–20	5–1	Qualcomm Stadium	CBS	Recap
8	4:15 pm EDT	October 31	Minnesota Vikings	W 28–18	6–1	Gillette Stadium	Fox	Recap
9	1:00 pm EST	November 7	at Cleveland Browns	L 14–34	6–2	Cleveland Browns Stadium	CBS	Recap
10	8:20 pm EST	November 14	at Pittsburgh Steelers	W 39–26	7–2	Heinz Field	NBC	Recap
11	4:15 pm EST	November 21	Indianapolis Colts	W 31–28	8–2	Gillette Stadium	CBS	Recap
12	12:30 pm EST	November 25	at Detroit Lions	W 45–24	9–2	Ford Field	CBS	Recap
13	8:30 pm EST	December 6	New York Jets	W 45–3	10–2	Gillette Stadium	ESPN	Recap
14	4:15 pm EST (Note: Game moved from 1:00 pm to 4:15 pm under NFL "flex scheduling" rules)	December 12	at Chicago Bears	W 36–7	11–2	Soldier Field	CBS	Recap
15	8:20 pm EST	December 19	Green Bay Packers	W 31–27	12–2	Gillette Stadium	NBC	Recap
16	1:00 pm EST	December 26	at Buffalo Bills	W 34–3	13–2	Ralph Wilson Stadium	CBS	Recap
17	1:00 pm EST	January 2	Miami Dolphins	W 38–7	14–2	Gillette Stadium	CBS	Recap

== Week 1 roster ==
New England Patriots 2010 Week 1 roster
Quarterbacks: 12 Tom Brady; 8 Brian Hoyer; Running backs: 33 Kevin Faulk; 42 BenJarvus Green-Ellis; 39 Laurence Maroney; 34 Sammy Morris FB; 21 Fred Taylor; Wide receivers: 11 Julian Edelman PR; 81 Randy Moss; 17 Taylor Price ^{R}; 18 Matthew Slater; 19 Brandon Tate KR; 83 Wes Welker; Tight ends: 82 Alge Crumpler; 87 Rob Gronkowski ^{R}; 85 Aaron Hernandez ^{R}	Offensive linemen: 63 Dan Connolly G/C; 77 Nick Kaczur T/G; 67 Dan Koppen C; 64 Mark LeVoir T; 72 Matt Light T; 65 Steve Maneri T ^{UR}; 61 Stephen Neal G; 76 Sebastian Vollmer T; 62 Ryan Wendell C/G; Defensive linemen: 97 Ron Brace DE; 71 Brandon Deaderick DE ^{R}; 74 Kyle Love NT ^{UR}; 91 Myron Pryor NT; 92 Gerard Warren DE; 75 Vince Wilfork NT; 99 Mike Wright DE	Linebackers: 95 Tully Banta-Cain OLB; 96 Jermaine Cunningham OLB ^{R}; 52 Dane Fletcher ILB ^{UR}; 59 Gary Guyton ILB; 51 Jerod Mayo ILB; 93 Marques Murrell OLB; 50 Rob Ninkovich OLB; 55 Brandon Spikes ILB ^{R}; 58 Tracy White ILB; Defensive backs: 27 Kyle Arrington CB; 28 Darius Butler CB; 25 Patrick Chung SS; 32 Devin McCourty CB ^{R}; 31 Brandon Meriweather FS; 44 Jarrad Page SS; 36 James Sanders FS; 22 Terrence Wheatley CB; 24 Jonathan Wilhite CB; Special teams: 3 Stephen Gostkowski K; 47 Jake Ingram LS; 14 Zoltan Mesko P ^{R}	Reserve lists: 45 Josh Barrett SS (IR); 23 Leigh Bodden CB (IR); -- George Bussey T/G (IR); 26 Bret Lockett FS (IR); 30 Brandon McGowan FS (IR); 69 Quinn Ojinnaka T/G (Susp.); 90 Darryl Richard DE (IR); 94 Ty Warren DE (IR); 66 Kade Weston DE (IR) ^{R}; Restricted FAs: 70 Logan Mankins G; Practice Squad: 38 Sergio Brown SS ^{UR}; 29 Tony Carter CB; 98 Shawn Crable OLB/DE; 35 Javarris James RB ^{UR}; 10 Darnell Jenkins WR; 53 Tyrone McKenzie ILB; 41 Prince Miller CB ^{UR}; 60 Rich Ohrnberger G/C; Notations: R: 2010 rookie; UR: 2010 undrafted rookie; Italicized players are not on the 80-man roster.

== Regular season results ==
=== Week 1: vs. Cincinnati Bengals ===
Quarter	1	2	3	4	Total
Bengals	0	3	14	7	24
Patriots	10	14	7	7	38

at Gillette Stadium, Foxborough, Massachusetts

- Game time: 1:00 pm EDT
- Game weather: 62 °F (17 °C), cloudy
- Game attendance: 68,756
- Referee: Carl Cheffers
- TV announcers (CBS): Jim Nantz (play-by-play) and Phil Simms (color commentator)

The Patriots began their season at home with an AFC duel against the Cincinnati Bengals.

After a Bengals punt, the Patriots scored the first points of the game, racing 72 yards in 5 plays, scoring on a 9-yard touchdown pass from Tom Brady to Wes Welker. Following a Bengals punt, the Patriots marched all the way to the Bengals 14, but had to settle for a 32-yard field goal by Stephen Gostkowski, extending the lead to 10–0. On the third play of the Bengals next drive, Cedric Benson fumbled with Rob Ninkovich recovering at the Bengals 34. The Patriots only gained 4 yards and Gostkowski missed a 47-yard field goal, keeping the score 10–0. After another Bengals punt, the Patriots engineered a 10 play, 80-yard drive, scoring on another touchdown pass from Brady to Welker, widening the lead to 17–0. The Bengals reached Patriots territory for the first time on their next drive, but Gary Guyton intercepted Carson Palmer at the 41 and returned it 59 yards for a touchdown, giving the Patriots a big 24–0 lead. The Bengals finally struck on their next drive, driving to the Patriots 35, and Mike Nugent hitting a 53-yard field goal, making the score 24–3. After Ben Tate returned the ensuing kick 38 yards to the Patriots 32, the Patriots reached the Bengals 37, but Gostkowski missed the 55-yard field goal attempt wide right. Palmer connected with Jordan Shipley for a 51-yard gain on the last play of the first half, but they couldn't reach the end zone and the Patriots led 24–3 at halftime. Tate returned the opening kickoff of the second half 97 yards for a touchdown, blowing the game open 31–3. The Bengals countered with a 12 play, 85-yard drive, in just under seven minutes, scoring on a 1-yard touchdown pass from Palmer to Jermaine Gresham, trimming the deficit to 31–10. After a Patriots three-and-out, the Bengals continued their comeback, marching 74 yards in 12 plays, scoring on a 28-yard touchdown pass from Palmer to Chad Ochocinco, trimming the deficit to a manageable 31–17. The Patriots ended any hope of a Bengals comeback on their next drive, engineering a 14 play, 81-yard drive, in nearly eight minutes, scoring on a 1-yard touchdown pass from Brady to rookie Rob Gronkowski, increasing the lead to 38-17 midway through the fourth quarter. The Bengals answered, racing 76 yards in under four minutes, scoring on a 1-yard touchdown run by Benson, bringing the score to 38–24 with just under four minutes to play and giving the Bengals some hope, but the Patriots got the ball after Michael Johnson was flagged for illegal touch on the onside kick. The Patriots drove all the way to the Bengals 7 and turned the ball over on downs, draining over two minutes off the clock. The Bengals ran out the rest of the clock and the Patriots won the game.

=== Week 2: at New York Jets ===
Quarter	1	2	3	4	Total
Patriots	0	14	0	0	14
Jets	0	10	11	7	28

at New Meadowlands Stadium, East Rutherford, New Jersey

- Game time: 4:15 pm EDT
- Game weather: 81 °F (27 °C), clear
- Game attendance: 78,535
- Referee: Ed Hochuli
- TV announcers (CBS): Jim Nantz (play-by-play) and Phil Simms (color commentator)

New England went on the road to face division rival New York in the latest meeting between the two teams at the New Meadowlands Stadium. The Jets had lost their opener to the Baltimore Ravens the previous week. The Patriots droved 51 yards in seven-and-a-half minutes to the Jets 14, but after a false-start penalty, Gostkowski missed a 37-yard field goal. After a Jets three-and-out, the Patriots went on a 15 play, 75-yard marathon, taking over eight minutes off the clock, scoring on a 6-yard touchdown pass to Welker early in the second quarter. After accruing no passing yards during the first quarter, the Jets marched 73 yards in 12 plays, taking just under 7 minutes off the clock, scoring on a 10-yard touchdown pass from Mark Sanchez to Braylon Edwards. Two possessions later, after two incomplete passes, Brady hit Hernandez for a 46-yard catch-and-run, then hit Moss for a 34-yard touchdown pass on an incredible one-handed catch, beating the vaunted Darrelle Revis, re-taking a 14–7 lead. The Jets answered, marching to the Patriots 31, and Nick Folk was good on a 49-yard field goal, trimming the deficit to 14–10 at halftime. After a Jets punt, the Patriots drove to the Jets 47, but Antonio Cromartie intercepted his pass attempt for Moss at the 3. The Jets raced to the Patriots 17, and Folk was good on a 36-yard field goal, trimming the deficit to just 14–13. The Jets cashed in after a Patriots three-and-out, racing 70 yards in 6 plays, scoring on a 2-yard touchdown pass to Jerricho Cotchery (with a successful 2-point conversion), taking a 21–14 lead. On the second play of the Patriots next drive, Cromartie intercepted another pass attempt for Moss at the Jets 41, but couldn't move the ball. After forcing the Patriots to punt, the Jets marched 63 yards in 8 plays, aided by a 23-yard pass interference penalty on Darius Butler, scoring on a 1-yard touchdown toss to Dustin Keller, widening the lead to 28-14 midway through the fourth quarter. The Patriots drove to the Jets 16, but Brady was strip-sacked by Jason Taylor with David Harris returning it 16 yards to the Jets 41. A 3-yard run by LaDainian Tomlinson on 4th-and-1 allowed the Jets ran out the rest of the clock to win the game.

With the loss, the Patriots fell to 1–1.

=== Week 3: vs. Buffalo Bills ===
Quarter	1	2	3	4	Total
Bills	3	13	7	7	30
Patriots	7	10	14	7	38

at Gillette Stadium, Foxborough, Massachusetts

- Game time: 1:00 pm EDT
- Game weather: 68 °F (20 °C), partly cloudy
- Game attendance: 68,756
- Referee: John Parry
- TV announcers (CBS): Kevin Harlan (play-by-play) and Solomon Wilcots (color commentator)

Hoping to rebound from their loss to the Jets, the Patriots returned to home ground for an AFC East match against the Bills.

The Bills marched right down the field on the opening drive, 59 yards, scoring on a 39-yard field goal by kicker Rian Lindell. The Patriots countered, storming 74 yards in 8 plays, scoring on a 7-yard touchdown pass from Brady to Randy Moss. Two possessions later, with great field position, the Bills drove to the Patriots 15, but after a 7-yard sack by Jerod Mayo the Bills settled with Lindell connecting on another 39-yard field goal, trimming the deficit to 7–6. On the fourth play of the Patriots next drive, Tate fumbled after a 14-yard catch being tackled by Drayton Florence with Jairus Byrd recovering at the Patriots 37. 7 plays later, Ryan Fitzpatrick threw a 5-yard touchdown pass to C. J. Spiller, giving the Bills a 13–7 lead. The Patriots countered, marching 76 yard in 6 plays, scoring when Danny Woodhead blazed away a 22-yard touchdown run late in the 2nd quarter. The Bills countered, reaching the Patriots 17, settling for a 35-yard field goal, after Fitzpatrick was ruled 1-yard short of a first down. After Tate returned the ensuing kickoff 32 yards to the Bills 33, Brady hit Tate and Hernandez for gains of 29 and 13 yards, respectively, setting up Gostkowski's successful 43-yard field goal attempt, bringing the first half shootout to an end with the Patriots leading 17–16. Aided by another good return by Tate, the Patriots raced 74 yards in under two minutes on the opening drive of the second half, scoring on a 35-yard touchdown bomb from Brady to Moss, increasing the lead to 24–16. With the touchdown, Moss moved to 5th on the all-time receiving list with 14,064 yards. This was Moss' 36th career game with 2 or more receiving touchdown, 2nd only to Jerry Rice (44). Brady tied Steve Young with 232 career touchdowns, tying Steve Young for 19th all-time. Spiller returned the ensuing kick 95-yards for a touchdown, trimming the deficit to 24–23. After a Bills three-and-out, the Bills drove to the Patriots 33, but Lindell missed a 51-yard field goal. With good field position at their own 41, the Patriots marched 59 yards in over 7 minutes, scoring on Brady's 5-yard touchdown pass to Gronkowski, giving him sole possession of 19th on the all-time touchdown passes list. The Bills drove to the Patriots 20 on their next drive, but Patrick Chung intercepted Fitzpatrick at the 1 and returned it to the Patriots 26. The Patriots marched 75 yards in over 6 minutes, scoring on a 7-yard touchdown run by BenJarvus Green-Ellis, increasing the lead to 38–23. The Bills moved 80 yards on their next drive, scoring on a 37-yard touchdown pass to Stevie Johnson, trimming the deficit to 38–30. After a Patriots three-and-out, Fitzpatrick was intercepted at the Patriots 43 by Brandon Meriweather. The Bills had a chance with over three minutes remaining, but 6-yard run by Green-Ellis enabled the Patriots to run out the rest of the clock and win the game.

With the win, the Patriots improved to 2–1.

=== Week 4: at Miami Dolphins ===
Quarter	1	2	3	4	Total
Patriots	0	6	21	14	41
Dolphins	7	0	7	0	14

at Sun Life Stadium, Miami Gardens, Florida

- Game time: 8:30 pm EDT
- Game weather: 80 °F (27 °C), clear
- Game attendance: 69,090
- Referee: Walt Coleman
- TV announcers (ESPN): Mike Tirico (play-by-play), Ron Jaworski and Jon Gruden (color commentators), Michele Tafoya and Suzy Kolber (sideline reporters)

Coming off their divisional home win over the Bills, the Patriots flew to Sun Life Stadium for a Week 4 AFC East duel with the Miami Dolphins on Monday Night Football. The Dolphins marched to the Patriots 38 on the opening drive, but punted. After a Patriots three-and-out, the Dolphins marched 64 yards in 7 plays, scoring on a 19-yard touchdown pass from Chad Henne to Davone Bess for a 7–0 lead. Four plays after the Patriots punted again, Ninkovich intercepted Henne at the Patriots 40. The Patriots drove all the way to the Dolphins 5, but settled for a 23-yard field goal by Gostkowski. The Dolphins drove to the Patriots 27 on their next drive, but Henne was intercepted again by Ninkovich at the 25. The Patriots drove all the way to the Dolphins 12, but again settled for a field goal, making the score 7-6 Dolphins at halftime. Tate returned the opening kickoff of the second half 103 yards for a touchdown, giving the Patriots the lead, 13-7 that they wouldn't relinquish. Chung blocked Brandon Fields' punt, with Brandon Spikes recovering at the Dolphins 15. Two plays later, the Patriots scored on a 12-yard touchdown run by Green-Ellis, increasing the lead to 20–7. The Dolphins answered on their next drive, marching 80 yards in 8 plays, scoring on a 28-yard screen pass to Ricky Williams, bringing the score to 20–14. The Patriots countered, driving 78 yards in 12 plays, scoring on an 11-yard screen pass to Woodhead, increasing the lead to 27–14. The Dolphins drove to the Patriots 29 on their next drive, but after a 7-yard sack by Ninkovich, attempted a 54-yard field goal, but the kick was blocked Chung with Kyle Arrington returning it 35 yards for a touchdown, increasing the lead to 34–14. The Dolphins reached their own 45 on their next drive, but Ronnie Brown was stuffed for no gain on 4th-and-2. After a Patriots three-and-out, the Dolphins drove to their own 47, but Chung intercepted Henne at the Patriots 49 and returned it 51 yards for a touchdown, increasing the lead to 41–14. The Dolphins drove to the Patriots 40 again on their next drive, but rookie Jarrad Page intercepted Henne at the Patriots 23. The Patriot ran out the rest of the clock to win the game.

With the win, not only did the Patriots head into their bye week at 3–1, but Brady picked up his 100th win in the fewest career starts (131) in NFL history. New England became the first team in NFL history to have a rushing, passing, interception return, kickoff return, and blocked field goal return for a touchdown in the same game.

=== Week 6: vs. Baltimore Ravens ===
Quarter	1	2	3	4	OT	Total
Ravens	3	7	7	3	0	20
Patriots	7	0	3	10	3	23

at Gillette Stadium, Foxborough, Massachusetts

- Game time: 1:00 pm EDT
- Game weather: 57 °F (14 °C), sunny
- Game attendance: 68,756
- Referee: Bill Leavy
- TV announcers (CBS): Jim Nantz (play-by-play) and Phil Simms (color commentator)

Coming off their bye week the Patriots played on home ground for an AFC duel with the Ravens. Earlier that week, the Patriots acquired former receiver Deion Branch in a trade with the Seattle Seahawks.

The Ravens went on a 15 play, 86-yard marathon drive, taking over 8 minutes and converting two third-and-longs, reaching the Patriots 8, but were forced to settle for a 26-yard field goal by Billy Cundiff. After both teams went three-and-out, the Patriots raced 66 yards in 6 plays, scoring on a two-yard touchdown run by Green-Ellis. The Ravens responded, marching 73 yards in 9 plays, scoring on a 16-yard touchdown pass from Joe Flacco to Todd Heap. Both teams punted for the remainder of the half and the Ravens held a 10–7 lead at halftime. Chris Carr intercepted Brad at the Patriots 48 on their next drive and returned it 12 yards. The Ravens needed just three plays to score on Flacco's 25-yard touchdown pass to Anquan Boldin, increasing the Ravens lead to 17–7. The Patriots responded by driving to the Ravens 20 and Gostkowski was good on a 38-yard field goal, trimming the deficit to 17–10. The Ravens countered on a 13 play, 84-yard drive to the Patriots 7, but were to settle for a 25-yard field goal, increasing the Ravens lead to 20-10 early in the fourth quarter. Cundiff made a huge mistake by kicking the ensuing kickoff out of bounds, giving the Patriots the ball at the Patriots 40. The Patriots didn't waste their chance, marching 60 yards in 8 plays, scoring on a 5-yard touchdown pass to Branch, trimming the deficit to 20–17. After forcing a punt, the Patriots drove all the way to the Ravens 6, but the Ravens held them to a field goal, tying the game 20-20. This was followed by Gostkowski making a 24-yard field goal. After a Ravens punt, Welker returned it 22 yards to the Patriots 44. After a 10-yard sack by Haloti Ngata, Brady completed a 10-yard screen to Woodhead back to the drive's starting place. instead of trying a 61-yard field goal, Tom Brady tried a Hail Mary which was intercepted by Ken Hamlin at the Ravens 4 with no time left on the clock. Both teams punted on their initial overtime possession. The Ravens marched to the Patriots 48 on their next possession, but punted again. Two possessions later, the Patriots marched to the Ravens 17 and Gostkowski was good on a 35-yard field goal, winning the game 23-20 for the Patriots.

Following the game Brandon Meriweather was heavily fined by the league for a helmet-to-helmet hit on Todd Heap.

With the win, New England improved to 4–1.

=== Week 7: at San Diego Chargers ===
Quarter	1	2	3	4	Total
Patriots	7	6	7	3	23
Chargers	3	0	0	17	20

at Qualcomm Stadium, San Diego, California

- Game time: 4:15 pm EDT/1:15 pm PDT
- Game weather: 69 °F (21 °C), sunny
- Game attendance: 68,836
- Referee: Tony Corrente
- TV announcers (CBS): Jim Nantz (play-by-play) and Phil Simms (color commentator)

Hoping to extend their winning streak the Patriots flew to Qualcomm Stadium for an AFC duel with the Chargers.

After the first two drive of the game ended in punts, the Chargers marched from midfield all the way to the 14, but settled for a 32-yard field goal by Kris Brown. Three plays after a Patriots punt, Kris Wilson fumbled after an 11-yard catch after being tackled by Spikes with Mayo recovering at the Chargers 22. Five plays later, Brady hit Gronkowski for a 1-yard touchdown. Four plays into the Chargers next drive, Richard Goodman caught a 25-yard pass, but fumbled with James Sanders recovering at the Patriots 41. After the Patriots offense sluggishness continued from last week and they punted. The Chargers responded by driving to the Patriots 32, but Ninkovich continued to wreak havoc for the 2nd straight game, strip-sacking Philip Rivers and returning it and returning it 62 yards to the Patriots 8. At the Patriots 6, back-to-back sacks by Shaun Phillips and Antwan Barnes forced the Patriots to settle for a 40-yard field goal by Gostkowski, increasing the lead to 10–3. On the third play of the Chargers next drive, Rivers was intercepted by rookie Devin McCourty at the Patriots 42. Two possessions later, aided by a 48-yard punt return by Julian Edelman, the Patriots drove to the Chargers 9, but another sack by Antwan Barnes forced the Patriots to settle for a 34-yard field goal by Gostkowski, increasing the lead to 13–3 at halftime. The Patriots took a 20–3 lead on the first drive of the second half, marching 76 yards in 17 plays, taking over eight minutes off the clock, scoring on a 1-yard touchdown run by Green-Ellis, running up the lead to 20–3. The Chargers responded by driving to the Patriots 10, but settled for a 28-yard field goal, trimming the deficit to 20–6. The Patriots countered by driving all the way to the Chargers 16, but the Chargers defense kept the Patriots of the endzone again, and Gostkowski kicked a 34-yard field goal, giving the Patriots a 23–6 lead early in the fourth quarter. The Chargers countered on their next drive, racing 67 yards in 11 plays, scoring on a 4-yard touchdown pass to Antonio Gates, trimming the deficit to 23-13 midway through the fourth quarter. The Chargers recovered the onside kick at the Patriots 40 and raced 60 yards in just 5 plays, scoring on a 1-yard touchdown run by Mike Tolbert trimming the deficit to just 23–20 with just over four minutes remaining in the game. On their next drive, the Patriots went for on 4th-and-1 at their own 49, attempting to end the game, but Green-Ellis was tackled for a 1-yard loss. The Chargers then stormed to their own 27, setting up a game-tying 45-yard field goal attempt by Brown, but guard Louis Vasquez was flagged for a false-start, moving the ball back 5 yards. Brown missed the 50-yard field goal with just :30 seconds left, sealing the win for the Patriots.

With the win, the Patriots improved to 5–1.

=== Week 8: vs. Minnesota Vikings ===
Quarter	1	2	3	4	Total
Vikings	0	7	3	8	18
Patriots	0	7	14	7	28

at Gillette Stadium, Foxborough, Massachusetts

- Game time: 4:15 pm EDT
- Game weather: 49 °F (9 °C), partly cloudy
- Game attendance: 68,756
- Referee: Walt Anderson
- TV announcers (Fox): Thom Brennaman (play-by-play), Troy Aikman (color commentator), and Pam Oliver (sideline reporter)

Hoping to extend their winning streak, the Patriots played on home ground for a game with the Vikings, who came to Foxboro with former Patriot Randy Moss.

On the third possession of the game, the Vikings marched 76 yards in over 6 minutes, scoring on a 1-yard touchdown run by Adrian Peterson, taking a 7–0 lead. The Patriots countered, going on an 8 play, 75-yard drive, scoring on a 3-yard touchdown run by Woodhead, tying the game 7-7. Two possessions later, the Vikings drove to the Patriots 1, facing a 4th-and-Goal, but Peterson was tackled for a 2-yard loss. Brady took two knees and the game went to halftime tied 7-7. The Vikings marched 68 yards to the Patriots 5 on the opening possession of the 2nd half, but settled for a 23-yard field goal by Ryan Longwell, taking a 10–7 lead. The Patriots countered on their next drive, storming 80 yards in 4 plays, scoring on a 65-yard touchdown bomb from Brady to Tate, taking a 14–10. Two possessions later, McCourty intercepted Favre at the Patriots 26 and returned it 37 yards to the Vikings 37. Four plays later, Green-Ellis scored on a 13-yard touchdown run, increasing the lead to 21–10. On the Vikings next drive, Brett Favre was knocked out of the game and Tarvaris Jackson took over Early in the fourth quarter, the Vikings marched 80 yards in 9 plays, scoring on a 1-yard touchdown pass to Naufahu Tahi, with a successful two-point conversion, trimming the deficit to just 21–18. The Patriots countered, marching 84 yards in 13 plays, scoring on a 2-yard touchdown run by Green-Ellis, his first career multi-touchdown game, increasing the lead to 28-18 and pretty much putting the game out of reach with just 1:56 remaining. The Vikings drove to the Vikings 27 after a 23-yard run by Toby Gerhart, but time ran out and the Patriots won the game.

With the win, the Patriots improved to 6–1.

=== Week 9: at Cleveland Browns ===
Quarter	1	2	3	4	Total
Patriots	0	7	0	7	14
Browns	10	7	7	10	34

at Cleveland Browns Stadium, Cleveland, Ohio

- Game time: 1:00 pm EST
- Game weather: 43 °F (6 °C), sunny/cold
- Game attendance: 66,292
- Referee: Clete Blakeman
- TV announcers (CBS): Bill Macatee (play-by-play) and Rich Gannon (color commentator)

Hoping to increase their winning streak the Patriots flew to Cleveland Browns Stadium for an AFC duel with the Browns.

The Browns took the opening kickoff 42 yards, scoring on a 38-yard field goal by Phil Dawson. Sammy Morris fumbled the ensuing kickoff and ex-Patriot Ray Ventrone recovered at the Patriots 19. Two plays later, Peyton Hillis scored on a 2-yard touchdown run. After a Patriots three-and-out, the Browns drove to the Patriots 49, but Hillis was stripped by Mayo and Meriweather recovered at the Patriots 36. The Patriots couldn't move the ball and punted. Early in the second quarter, the Patriots marched 79 yards in 11 plays, scoring on Brady's two-yard touchdown pass to Hernandez on a deflection, trimming the deficit to 10–7. However, Cleveland countered with a 9 play, 60-yard drive, scoring on an 11-yard touchdown run by Chansi Stuckey on an end-around, extending the lead to 17–7. The Patriots drove to the Browns 9, but after catching a 6-yard pass, Gronkowski was stripped at the 3-yard line with Abram Elam recovering at the 2. The Browns took a knee and led 17–7 at halftime. Following a Patriots punt, the Browns marched 72 yards in 10 plays, scoring on a 16-yard touchdown run by Colt McCoy, increasing the Browns' lead to a stunning 24–7. The Patriots reached the Browns 49 on their next drive, but a holding penalty on Gronkowski killed the drive as their offensive struggles continued. The Browns marched all the way to the Patriots 20 on their next drive, and Dawson was good on a 38-yard field goal, putting the Browns up 27–7 early in the fourth quarter. The Patriots raced 69 yards in 14 plays on their next drive, scoring when Brady found Hernandez on another 1-yard touchdown pass, trimming the deficit to a manageable 27–14. The Browns reached the 39 in five plays, then Hillis burst through and took off for a 33-yard touchdown run, giving the Browns a 34–14 lead and sealing their shocking win. Hoyer stepped in for Brady on their next drive and was intercepted by Eric Wright on the second play at the Browns 40. After the Browns punted, Hoyer took a knee to end the game.

With the upset loss, the Patriots fell to 6–2 and 2-1 against the AFC North. However, as of 2025, this remains the last time the Patriots had lost to the Cleveland Browns.

=== Week 10: at Pittsburgh Steelers ===
Quarter	1	2	3	4	Total
Patriots	10	0	13	16	39
Steelers	0	3	0	23	26

at Heinz Field, Pittsburgh, Pennsylvania

- Game time: 8:20 pm EST
- Game weather: 49 °F (9 °C), cloudy
- Game attendance: 64,359
- Referee: Carl Cheffers
- TV announcers (NBC): Al Michaels (play-by-play), Cris Collinsworth (color commentator), and Andrea Kremer (sideline reporter)

Hoping to rebound from their loss to the Browns, the Patriots flew to Heinz Field to face the Steelers.

After forcing the Steelers to punt on the opening drive, the Patriots marched 70 yards in just 8 plays, scoring on a 19-yard touchdown pass from Brady to Gronkowski. After the Steelers punted, the Patriots drove to the 12, but the Steelers' #1-ranked defense tightened and limited the Patriots to a 30-yard field goal by Shayne Graham, increasing their lead to 10–0. Two possessions later, the Steelers drove to the Patriots 4, but settled for a 22-yard field goal by Jeff Reed, making the score 10–3. Both teams punted for the rest of the half and the Patriots led 10–3 at halftime. The Patriots opened a scoring barrage in the second half. On the opening possession of the third quarter, the Patriots marched 78 yards in a perfectly balanced 10-play (5 passes, 5 rushes) drive, scoring on a 9-yard touchdown pass from Brady to Gronkowski, increasing their lead to 17–3. After both teams punted, the Steelers drove 59 yards (aided by a 38-yard pass interference call on Brandon Meriweather) to the Patriots 8-yard line, but Reed missed a 26-yard field goal. The Patriots took advantage, marching 80 yards in 7 plays, scoring on Brady's 3-yard touchdown run, with a missed extra point, increasing the Patriots' lead to 23–3. The Steelers countered on their next drive, racing 71 yards in 7 plays and scoring on a 6-yard touchdown pass from Ben Roethlisberger to Emmanuel Sanders, trimming the deficit to 23–10. After the Patriots punted, Roethlisberger was intercepted by James Sanders, who returned the interception 32 yards for a touchdown, increasing the lead to 29-10 after a missed two-point conversion. Sanders returned the ensuing kick 26 yards to the Patriots 47 and the Steelers raced 53 yards in just 5 plays, scoring on a 15-yard touchdown pass to Mike Wallace, with a successful two-point conversion, trimming the deficit to 29–18. After recovering the onside kick, the Patriots put the game away, marching effortlessly, 41 yards in only 5 plays, and scoring on a 25-yard touchdown pass to Gronkowski, his third touchdown reception of the game, giving the Patriots an insurmountable 36–18 lead with 4:23 remaining. Roethlisberger completed four passes, all to Mike Wallace on the next drive, including a 33-yard touchdown pass, with another successful two-point conversion, trimming the deficit to 36–26, but the Patriots' Alge Crumpler recovered the onside kick. Graham added the final points of the game with a 36-yard field goal, bringing the score to 39–26. Pittsburgh drove to New England's 15 with a few seconds left but could not score.

Brady finished 30/43 for 350 yards, three touchdowns, and no interceptions against the top-ranked defense in the NFL. Gronkowski caught all three touchdowns en route to a 5-catch, 72-yard night. Roethlisberger threw for 387 yards in defeat. With the win, New England improved to 7–2.

=== Week 11: vs. Indianapolis Colts ===
Quarter	1	2	3	4	Total
Colts	0	14	0	14	28
Patriots	7	14	7	3	31

at Gillette Stadium, Foxborough, Massachusetts

- Game time: 4:15 pm EST
- Game weather: 37 °F (3 °C), sunny and cold
- Game attendance: 68,756
- Referee: Gene Steratore
- TV announcers (CBS): Jim Nantz (play-by-play) and Phil Simms (color commentator)

Coming off their win over the Steelers, the Patriots played on home ground against the Colts for the first time in four seasons.

The Colts took the opening kick and drove to the Patriots 46-yard line, but on 3rd and 6 Peyton Manning was intercepted by Brandon Meriweather, who returned it 39 yards to the Colts 32. Four plays later, Brady threw a 22-yard touchdown pass to Wes Welker for an early 7–0 lead. After a Colts punt, the Patriots amassed a 15-play, 87-yard drive, culminating with Brady throwing an 8-yard touchdown pass to Hernandez, increasing their lead to 14-0 early in the second quarter. The Colts responded on their next drive, with Manning passing for 62 yards on a 69-yard drive and scoring on a 1-yard touchdown pass to tight end Gijon Robinson. Ben Tate returned the ensuing kickoff 32 yards to the Patriots 35, and the Patriots offense marched 65 yards in 8 plays, scoring on a 5-yard run by Green-Ellis, increasing their lead to 21–7. The Colts answered right back, engineering a 12-play, 73-yard drive and scoring on an 11-yard touchdown pass from Manning to Reggie Waynewith only 0:08 left in the first half, trimming the deficit to 21–14. After both teams punted on their first drives of the second half, the Patriots raced 79 yards in just 9 plays, scoring on a 36-yard touchdown burst by Woodhead, extending the lead 28–14 on the only score of the third quarter. On the second play of the Colts' next drive, Manning was intercepted by McCourty at the Patriots 39. The Patriots drove to the Colts 7, but the Colts defense held, forcing the Patriots to settle for a 25-yard field goal, widening the lead to 31–14 with 10:27 left in the game. Manning threw for 66 yards on the ensuing 73-yard drive, including a 5-yard touchdown pass to Blair White, trimming the deficit to 31–21. After forcing a quick three-and-out, with help from an unnecessary roughness penalty on Tully Banta-Cain, the Colts raced 58 yards, with Manning throwing his fourth touchdown of the night, again to White, trimming the deficit to just 31–28 with 4:46 remaining in the game. The Colts forced another quick punt and got the ball at their own 26-yard line with 2:25 remaining, giving Manning a chance to execute a miraclulous comeback against the Patriots for a second year in a row. Manning drove the Colts to the Patriots 24-yard line but was intercepted by James Sanders at the 6-yard line with 0:37 remaining, giving the Patriots the win.

Manning shredded the Patriots' 32nd-ranked pass defense, finishing 38/52 for 396 yards and 4 touchdowns, but he also threw three interceptions (two in Patriots territory) . Brady was 19/25 for just 186 yards but did not turn the ball over. Green-Ellis and Woodhead spearheaded a 134-yard team rushing attack. With the win, the Patriots improved to 8–2.

=== Week 12: at Detroit Lions ===
Thanksgiving Day game

Quarter	1	2	3	4	Total
Patriots	3	7	14	21	45
Lions	7	10	7	0	24

at Ford Field, Detroit, Michigan

- Game time: 12:30 pm EST
- Game weather: Played indoors, domed stadium
- Game attendance: 60,965
- Referee: Ron Winter
- TV announcers (CBS): Jim Nantz (play-by-play) and Phil Simms (color commentator)

Coming off their win over the Colts, the Patriots flew to Ford Field, donned their throwback uniforms, and played a Week 12 Thanksgiving game with the Detroit Lions.

After the first three possessions of the game ended in punts, the Patriots struck first blood, driving all the way to the Lions 2-yard line, but could only muster a 19-yard field goal by Shayne Graham. The Lions countered, driving 71 yards in 11 plays, scoring on a 19-yard touchdown pass from Shaun Hill to Calvin Johnson. After a Patriots punt, another long Lions drive, going 63 yards in 13 plays, ended with running back Maurice Morris punching through a 1-yard touchdown run, increasing the Lions lead to 14–3. The Patriots answered their touchdown with one of their own, marching 83 yards in 10 plays, scoring on a 15-yard touchdown run by Green-Ellis with 0:45 seconds left in the half. The Lions appeared to have stopped the Patriots after Brady threw an incomplete pass on 3rd-and-6, but DeAndre Levy was called for pass interference, giving the Patriots a 1st down. Stefan Logan returned the ensuing kickoff 30 yards to the Lions 33. The return allowed the Lions to drive to the Patriots 26 and Dave Rayner was good on a 44-yard field goal, giving the Patriots a 17-10 halftime lead. After forcing a Patriots punt, McCourty intercepted Hill on an underthrown pass, and returned it 23 yards to the Lions' 26. Five plays later, Brady threw a 5-yard touchdown pass to Welker, tying the game 17-17. However, the Patriots weak defense couldn't catch a break. Aided by Logan's 42-yard return, the Lions countered, marching 58 yards in 9 plays, with Morris scoring on a 1-yard touchdown run, putting the Lions back out in front, 24–17. The Patriots needed just three plays to strike back, with Brady finding Branch deep on a 79-yard touchdown, capping off the 87-yard drive and tying the game 24-24. This was the Patriots' longest play from scrimmage of their 2010 season. After a 30-yard kick return by Logan, the Lions drove all the way to the Patriots 28, but Rayner missed a 46-yard field goal, keeping the game tied. The Patriots regained the lead on their ensuing drive, with Brady completing 3/3 passes for 59 yards on a 64-yard drive, finding Branch again on a 22-yard touchdown pass early in the fourth quarter. After a Lions punt, the Patriots marched 84 yards in 7 plays, scoring on a 16-yard touchdown pass to Welker, extending the lead to 38–24. On the third play of the Lions' next drive, Hill was intercepted by McCourty, who returned it 50 yards to the Lions 12. Four plays later, the Patriots put the game out of reach with a 1-yard touchdown run by Green-Ellis, making the score 45–24. During the extra point and afterwards, the Lions were called for three personal fouls, including one on defensive tackle Ndamukong Suh. This allowed the Patriots to kick off from the Lions' 40-yard line, and Graham was able to put the ball through the uprights, to a storm of boos from the Ford Field crowd. The Lions drove to the Patriots 6-yard line, but turned the ball over on downs and the Patriots took a knee to end the game.

With the win, New England improved to 9–2. Brady (21/27, 341 yards, 4 touchdowns, perfect 158.3 passer rating) was named CBS's All-Iron Award winner by Phil Simms. Runners up for the award included Suh, Johnson, Branch, and Morris.

=== Week 13: vs. New York Jets ===
Quarter	1	2	3	4	Total
Jets	0	3	0	0	3
Patriots	17	7	7	14	45

at Gillette Stadium, Foxborough, Massachusetts

- Game time: 8:30 pm EST
- Game weather: 27 °F (−3 °C), cloudy, cold, windy with snow flurries
- Game attendance: 68,756
- Referee: Scott Green
- TV announcers (ESPN): Mike Tirico (play-by-play), Ron Jaworski and Jon Gruden (color commentators), Michele Tafoya and Suzy Kolber (sideline reporters)

Coming off their win over the Lions on Thanksgiving, the Patriots returned home for a highly anticipated Monday Night Football game with the 9-2 New York Jets with the outright lead in the AFC East and the AFC conference on the line. New York was ahead in the standings by virtue of their win over New England in Week 2.

In a sign of what was to come, the Patriots took the opening kickoff and marched right down the field, 52 yards in 9 plays, with Shayne Graham kicking a 41-yard field goal for the early 3–0 lead. The Jets drove to the Patriots 35 on their ensuing possession, but Folk missed a 53-yard field goal. Starting at their own 43, the Patriots raced 57 yards in 6 plays, aided by a pass interference penalty on Eric Smith, scoring on a 1-yard touchdown run by Green-Ellis, increasing the lead to 10–0. After another Jets three-and-out, Steve Weatherford punted just 12 yards, giving the Patriots fantastic field position at the Jets 32. The Patriots took a commanding 17–0 lead just four plays later, with Brady hooking up with Branch on a 25-yard touchdown pass. The Jets responded on their next drive, driving 46 yards to the Patriots 21 and scoring on a 39-yard field goal in what would be the Jets' only score of the game. Ben Tate returned the kick 21 yards to the Patriots 33, setting up a 7 play, 67 yard drive in just under 4 minutes, with Tate finishing the drive as well, catching a 4-yard touchdown pass from Brady, widening the lead to 24–3 with over 8 minutes left in the first half. Neither team reached opposing territory until the Jets drove all the way to the Patriots 37, but Sanchez was sacked for a 15-yard loss by Banta-Cain, and the Patriots led 24–3 at halftime. The Jets drove all the way to the Patriots 9 on their opening drive of the second half, but Spikes intercepted Sanchez at the 2 and returned it 5 yards to the Patriots 7. The Patriots put together an 8 play, 93-yard drive in only four-and-a-half minutes, scoring on Brady's 18-yard touchdown pass to Welker, increasing the lead to 31–3. A bad kick gave the Jets good field position at their own 47. After an 8-yard run by Greene to the Patriots 45, Sanchez was intercepted by McCourty at the Patriots 6 for no gain. The Patriots just couldn't be stopped, though, engineering a nearly-identical, 8 play, 94-yard drive, scoring on Brady's 1-yard touchdown pass to Hernandez on the first play of the fourth quarter, increasing the blowout to 38–3. Sanchez threw an interception on a third straight drive, this one to James Sanders who returned it 28 yards to the Jets 28. Six plays later, Green-Ellis scored on a 5-yard touchdown run, making the score 45–3 with still 9:20 remaining in the game. The Jets drove to the Patriots 9, but turned the ball over on downs. After the Patriots punted, the Jets drove Patriots 34, but couldn't score before the clock ran out.

With the win, the Patriots improved to 10–2, and took sole possession of first place in the AFC East which they would not relinquish. The Patriots out-gained the Jets 405-301 and forced the Jets into three turnovers which the Patriots converted into 21 points. Tom Brady was 21/29, 326 yards, four touchdowns, and a 148.8 passer rating, extending his streak of 228 passes without an interception (7 consecutive games, setting a franchise record of most starts without an interception). Additionally, Brady won his 26th consecutive home game as a starting quarterback, dating back to 2006, breaking Brett Favre's previous record of 25 games (1995–1998).

=== Week 14: at Chicago Bears ===
Quarter	1	2	3	4	Total
Patriots	7	26	3	0	36
Bears	0	0	7	0	7

at Soldier Field, Chicago, Illinois

- Game time: 4:15 pm EST/3:15 pm CST
- Game weather: 26 °F (−3 °C), snow, windy with gusts to 53 m.p.h., temps falling to low 20's
- Game attendance: 62,347
- Referee: Mike Carey
- TV announcers (CBS): Jim Nantz (play-by-play) and Phil Simms (color commentator)

Coming off their 45–3 win over the Jets, the Patriots flew to Soldier Field for a snowy game with the Bears.

After both teams punted on their opening drive, the Patriots marched 85 yards in 12 plays, scoring on a 7-yard touchdown pass from Brady to Gronkowski. The Bears reached the Patriots 49 on their next drive, but ended up punting. The Patriots quickly struck again, racing 87 yards in 11 plays, scoring on a 3-yard touchdown run by Woodhead. Danieal Manning returned the ensuing kickoff 33 yards to the Bears 38. On the very next play, Jay Cutler tossed a 1-yard pass to Johnny Knox, but Devin McCourty stripped him, with Guyton recovering and returning the fumble 35 yards for a touchdown, increasing the Patriots lead to 21–0. The Bears punted again on their next drive, with Edelman returning it 42 yards to the Bears 30. The Patriots reached the Bears 12, but were forced to settle for a 30-yard field goal by Shayne Graham and a 24–0 lead. On the Bears next play from scrimmage, Eugene Moore strip-sacked Cutler with Mayo recovering at the Bears 9. Once again the Bears clamped down, and held the Patriots to a field goal, turning the game to a 27-0 blowout. The lifelessness continued on their next drive, with another three-and-out. Edelman returned the punt 71 yards for a touchdown, but the touchdown was nullified on by a holding penalty on Dane Fletcher. It didn't matter though, because it took three plays for the Patriots to reach their own 41 and then Brady found Deion Branch for a 59-yard touchdown pass (with a missed extra point), making the score 33–0 at halftime. The Bears punted on their opening possession of the second half. It was almost a disaster, Brad Maynard fumbled the punt, but was able to recover and punt it away. The Patriots drove all the way to the Bears 11, but their red zone defense continued to hold, and they settled for a 29-yard field goal, increasing their lead to 36–0 against one of the best defenses in the NFL. The dangerous Devin Hester returned the ensuing kickoff 61 yards to the Patriots 35. Aided by a 30-yard pass from Cutler to Matt Forte, it took 6 plays for the Bears to finally score on a 1-yard touchdown run by Chester Taylor, making the score 36–7. The Patriots drove to the Bears 28 on their next drive, but rather than attempt a field goal, decided to go for it, but Aaron Hernandez was tackled short of the first down. The Bears drove to the Patriots 26, but Cutler was intercepted by Guyton who returned it 13 yards to the Bears 26. After a Patriots punt, Cutler was intercepted for the 2nd consecutive time in the end zone by Meriweather. The Patriots ran out the final six-and-a-half minutes to end the game.

Brady extended his streak of pass attempts without an interception to 268 passes, while marking his sixth straight game with at least two touchdowns without an interception, tying Don Meredith's record set in 1965–1966. The Patriots also became the first team in NFL history to have five consecutive games with zero turnovers and at least 30 points in every game.

With the win, the Patriots not only improved to 11–2, but also became the first team in the league to clinch a playoff berth.

=== Week 15: vs. Green Bay Packers ===
Quarter	1	2	3	4	Total
Packers	3	14	7	3	27
Patriots	7	7	7	10	31

at Gillette Stadium, Foxborough, Massachusetts

- Game time: 8:20 pm EST
- Game weather: 32 °F (0 °C), cloudy and cold
- Game attendance: 68,756
- Referee: Ed Hochuli
- TV announcers (NBC): Al Michaels (play-by-play), Cris Collinsworth (color commentator), and Andrea Kremer (sideline reporter)

Coming off their road win over the Bears, the Patriots returned home for a game with the Green Bay Packers. After Green Bay recovered their own opening kick-off onside kick, they marched to the Patriots 7, but on 2nd-and-6, Eugene Moore sacked Matt Flynn was sacked for a 6-yard loss, and after an incomplete pass on 3rd-and-12, settled for a 31-yard field goal by Mason Crosby. The Patriots countered, racing 73 yards in 7 plays, and scoring on a 33-yard touchdown run by Green-Ellis. Two possessions later, on the third play of the Packers drive, Flynn hit James Jones for a 66-yard touchdown bomb on the first play of the second quarter, giving the Packers a 10–7 lead. Three possessions later, the Packers marched 82 yards in six-and-a-half minutes, scoring on a 1-yard touchdown pass from Flynn to Greg Jennings, giving them a very surprising 17–7 lead late in the first half, but the momentum instantly swung back to New England. Offensive lineman Dan Connolly returned the squib kick 71 yards to 3 yard line. Three plays later, Brady threw a 2-yard touchdown pass to Hernandez, trimming the deficit to 17–14 at halftime. The Packers receive the 2nd half kickoff and on the fourth play of their first possession, Arrington intercepted a short pass from Flynn and returned it 36 yards for a touchdown, giving the Patriots a 21–17 lead. After Sam Shields returned the ensuing kickoff 21 yards to the 31, the Packers countered, engineering a 13-play, 69-yard drive, taking just under six minutes off the clock, and scoring on a 6-yard touchdown pass from Flynn to John Kuhn, re-taking the lead 24–21. B. J. Raji ended the Patriots next drive with a 10-yard sack of Brady on 3rd-and-9. Set up with tremendous field position at their own 46, the Packers drove to the Patriots 1-yard line, but couldn't get in on two consecutive plays, and settled for a 19-yard field goal by Crosby, increasing the lead to 27–21, but keeping the Patriots in the game. The Patriots seemed primed to make the Packers regret their red zone mistake, reaching the Packers 20, but could only trim the deficit to 27–24 on a 38-yard field goal by Graham. After a Packers three-and-out, the Patriots raced 63 yards in 6 plays, not facing a single third-down, scoring on 10-yard touchdown pass from Brady to Hernandez, giving them a 31–27 lead. The Packers looked finished after punting with less than five minutes remaining, but after forcing the Patriots to a three-and-out, the Packers took over at their own 43 with 4:22 remaining, and once last chance to pull off the stunning upset. The Packers drove to the Patriots 24, but Fletcher sacked Flynn for a costly 8 yard loss. After back-to-back completions to Jones and Donald Driver for gains of 7 and 10 yards, respectively, the Packers faced a 4th-and-1 at the Patriots 15, but Banta-Cain strip-sacked Flynn and Wilfork recovered and the Patriots escaped with the win.

With the win, the Patriots improved to 12–2, sweeping the NFC North. It was Brady's seventh consecutive game with at least two touchdowns without an interception, breaking Don Meredith's 1965–1966 record of six such games. Brady attempted 24 passes and his streak of consecutive pass attempts without an interception was extended to 292–3rd longest all-time, behind only Bernie Kosar's 308 (1990–91), and Bart Starr's 294 (1964–65). Brady did break the single season record also held by Kosar. Upon defeating the Packers on Sunday Night, every NFC team has now accumulated at least one loss at Gillette Stadium during its first nine years of existence. Also, for the fourth time in six games, the Patriots scored at least 31 points against a top-10 defense, winning every game. This was the Patriots first home victory over the Packers since 1985.

=== Week 16: at Buffalo Bills ===
Quarter	1	2	3	4	Total
Patriots	7	17	7	3	34
Bills	3	0	0	0	3

at Ralph Wilson Stadium, Orchard Park, New York

- Game time: 1:00 pm EST
- Game weather: 22 °F (−6 °C), cloudy
- Game attendance: 68,281
- Referee: Alberto Riveron
- TV announcers (CBS): Kevin Harlan (play-by-play) and Solomon Wilcots (color commentator)

The Patriots' fifteenth game was an AFC East rivalry rematch against the Bills.

The Bills took the first possession of the game 62 yards to the Patriots 8, but had to settle for a 26-yard field goal. The Patriots drove to the Bills 46, but were forced to punt. After a Bills three-and-out, the Patriots raced 48 yards in 4 plays, taking just 1:47, scoring on a 29-yard touchdown run by Woodhead. The Bills drove to Patriots 17, but Fitzpatrick was strip-sacked by Guyton with Mayo recovering at the Patriots 20. The Patriots marched 78 yards on 9 plays, scoring on an 8-yard touchdown pass to Rob Gronkowski, increasing the lead to 14–3. The Bills drove all the way to the Patriots 32 on their next drive, but turned the ball over on downs. The Patriots continued to move the ball easily on their next drive, reaching the 16, and Graham kicked a 34-yard field goal, increasing the lead to 17–3. On the fourth play of the Bills next drive, Fitzpatrick was intercepted at the Bills 46 by Chung who returned it 19 yards to the Bills 27. Seven plays later, Brady hit Alge Crumpler on a 4-yard touchdown pass, widening their lead to 24–3 at halftime. After a Patriots three-and-out, Fitzpatrick was intercepted by Page at the Bills 21. A chop block penalty on Chad Reinhart moved the ball to the Bills 11. Four plays later, Brady hit Gronkowski on an 8-yard touchdown pass, making the score 31–3. The Bills drove to the Patriots 22 on their next drive, but turned the ball over on downs. Early in the fourth, Graham hit a 26-yard field goal, making the score 34–3. The Bills turned it over two more times and punted every other time as the Patriots cruised to a dominating win.

With the win, New England improved to 13–2, clinched the AFC East along with the number one seed and homefield advantage throughout the playoffs. Brady had his ninth consecutive game without an interception, and in the process broke Bernie Kosar's record of pass attempts without an interception (308, from 1991 to 1992). It was also his eighth consecutive game with at least two touchdowns and no interceptions.

=== Week 17: vs. Miami Dolphins ===
Quarter	1	2	3	4	Total
Dolphins	0	0	0	7	7
Patriots	14	10	14	0	38

at Gillette Stadium, Foxborough, Massachusetts

- Game time: 1:00 pm EST
- Game weather: 47 °F (8 °C), cloudy and occasional rain
- Game attendance: 68,756
- Referee: Terry McAulay
- TV announcers (CBS): Bill Macatee (play-by-play) and Rich Gannon (color commentator)

The Patriots' final regular season game was an AFC East rematch against the Dolphins.

Four plays into the Dolphins' first possession, McCourty intercepted Henne at the Dolphins 47, his 7th. The Patriots raced 47 yards in 6 plays on their next drive, scoring on Brady's 13-yard touchdown pass to Gronkowski. Gronkowski set a new Patriots' record for touchdown receptions by a rookie, 10 and Brady became the 7th player to throw a touchdown pass in all 16 games. After a Dolphins punt, Kendall Langford stripped Woodhead with Paul Soliai recovering at the Patriots 34. The Dolphins only reached the Patriots 22 and Carpenter missed a 40-yard field goal. The Patriots made the Dolphins pay, racing 70 yards in a mere 4 plays, in under two minutes, with Green-Ellis scoring on a 1-yard touchdown run, increasing their lead to 14–0. The Dolphins drove to the Patriots 37 on their next drive, but Henne was sacked for a 7-yard loss and the Dolphins punted. Later in the half, the Dolphins drove to the Patriots 41, where Eugene Moore stripped Ricky Williams with Ninkovich recovering at the Patriots 41. The Patriots proceeded to drive to the Dolphins 10, but could only score on a 28-yard field goal, pushing the lead to 17–0. A few plays later, Edelman scored on a 94-yard punt return, increasing the lead to 24–0 at halftime. The Patriots engineered a 7 play, 78-yard drive on the opening possession of the second half, with Brady throwing a 10-yard touchdown pass to Crumpler, turning the game into a 31-0 blowout. After a Dolphins punt, Hoyer stepped in for Brady and led an 8 play, 85-yard drive, giving the Patriots a 38–0 lead. Late in the game, the Dolphins raced 80 yards in just 5 plays, scoring on a 21-yard touchdown pass from Tyler Thigpen to Davone Bess, making the final 38–7.

It was Brady's tenth consecutive game without an interception and ninth consecutive game with no interceptions and two touchdowns. With the win, the Patriots ended their regular season with a 14–2 record while also finishing 5-1 against the AFC East.

== Standings ==
AFC East
	W	L	T	PCT	DIV	CONF	PF	PA	STK
^{(1)} New England Patriots	14	2	0	.875	5–1	10–2	518	313	W8
^{(6)} New York Jets	11	5	0	.688	4–2	9–3	367	304	W1
Miami Dolphins	7	9	0	.438	2–4	5–7	273	333	L3
Buffalo Bills	4	12	0	.250	1–5	3–9	283	425	L2

=== Standings breakdown ===
	W	L	T	Pct.	PF	PA
Home	8	0	0	1.000	272	157
Away	6	2	0	.750	246	156
AFC East Opponents	5	1	0	.833	210	85
AFC Opponents	10	2	0	.833	378	237
NFC Opponents	4	0	0	1.000	140	76
By Stadium Type
Indoors	1	0	0	1.000	45	24
Outdoors	13	2	0	.867	473	289

== Postseason schedule ==
Round	Date	Opponent	Result	Record	Venue	Source
Divisional	January 16, 2011	New York Jets (6)	L 21–28	0–1	Gillette Stadium	Recap

== Postseason results ==
=== AFC Divisional Playoffs vs. (6) New York Jets ===
AFC Divisional Playoffs: (6) New York Jets at (1) New England Patriots – Game summary

Quarter	1	2	3	4	Total
Jets	0	14	0	14	28
Patriots	3	0	8	10	21

at Gillette Stadium, Foxborough, Massachusetts

- Date: January 16
- Game time: 4:30 pm EST
- Game weather: 30 °F (−1 °C), clear and cold
- Game attendance: 68,756
- Referee: Bill Leavy
- TV announcers (CBS): Jim Nantz (play-by-play) and Phil Simms (color commentator)

Game information

First quarter

- NE – Shayne Graham 34-yard field goal, 1:12. Patriots 3–0. Drive: 11 plays, 63 yards, 4:32.

Second quarter

- NYJ – LaDainian Tomlinson 7-yard pass from Mark Sanchez (Nick Folk kick), 10:24. Jets 7–3. Drive: 5 plays, 49 yards, 1:56.
- NYJ – Braylon Edwards 15-yard pass from Mark Sanchez (Nick Folk kick), 0:33. Jets 14–3. Drive: 4 plays, 37 yards, 0:33.

Third quarter

- NE – Alge Crumpler 2-yard pass from Tom Brady (Sammy Morris run), 0:13. Jets 14–11. Drive: 8 plays, 80 yards, 3:51.

Fourth quarter

- NYJ – Santonio Holmes 7-yard pass from Mark Sanchez (Nick Folk kick), 13:00. Jets 21–11. Drive: 5 plays, 75 yards, 2:13.
- NE – Shayne Graham 35-yard field goal, 1:57. Jets 21–14. Drive: 7 plays, 26 yards, 1:32.
- NYJ – Shonn Greene 16-yard run (Nick Folk kick), 1:41. Jets 28–14. Drive: 2 plays, 20 yards, 0:16.
- NE – Deion Branch 13-yard pass from Tom Brady (Shayne Graham kick), 0:24. Jets 28–21. Drive: 7 plays, 59 yards, 1:17.

Top passers

- NYJ – Mark Sanchez – 16/25, 194 yards, 3 TD
- NE – Tom Brady – 29/45, 299 yards, 2 TD, INT

Top rushers

- NYJ – Shonn Greene – 17 rushes, 76 yards, TD
- NE – Danny Woodhead – 14 rushes, 46 yards

Top receivers

- NYJ – Jerricho Cotchery – 5 rec, 96 yards
- NE – Rob Gronkowski – 4 rec, 65 yards

Mark Sanchez completed 16 of 25 passes for 194 yards and three touchdowns to lead the Jets to victory, avenging a 45–3 loss to New England in December.

On the Patriots first drive, Tom Brady threw his first interception since week five of the regular season, which linebacker David Harris picked off and returned 58 yards before tight end Alge Crumpler made a touchdown saving tackle at the 12-yard line. But New York could not get any points off the turnover, as they were unable to get a first down and Nick Folk missed a 30-yard field goal attempt. Several plays into New England's next drive, Brady completed a 28-yard pass to Crumpler at the Jets 12-yard line. But after a 5-yard run by Danny Woodhead, Crumpler dropped a pass in the end zone and then Brady was sacked by Shaun Ellis, forcing them to settle for Shayne Graham's 34-yard field goal to give them a 3–0 lead.

In the second quarter, a third down sack of Brady by Drew Coleman forced New England to punt from their own 16, and Jerricho Cotchery returned the ball 5 yards to the Patriots 49-yard line. A few plays later, Sanchez' 37-yard completion to Braylon Edwards set up his 7-yard touchdown pass to LaDainian Tomlinson. Later on, New England attempted a fake punt with a direct snap to safety Patrick Chung on fourth down and four. But Chung fumbled the snap and was tackled on his own 25-yard line, and the Jets converted the turnover with Sanchez' 15-yard touchdown pass to Edwards with 33 seconds left in the half, making the score 14–3.

Late in the third quarter, New England drove 80 yards in 11 plays, with Brady completing a 37-yard pass to Rob Gronkowski and two passes Deion Branch for 28 yards on the way to a 2-yard touchdown pass to Crumpler. Then Sammy Morris scored a 2-point conversion run, cutting their deficit to 14–11. But the Jets quickly countered, with Sanchez throwing short pass to Cotchery, who took it 58 yards to the Partriots 13-yard line. Two plays later, Sanchez threw a high pass for Santonio Holmes, who managed to catch the ball and land his in the end zone while falling out of bounds, giving New York a 10-point lead two minutes into the fourth quarter.

After the kickoff, New England drove to the Jets 34-yard line with an 8-minute drive, but then faced fourth down and 13. Rather than risk a 52-yard field goal attempt, they attempted to get the first down, but Branch dropped a pass from Brady and the Patriots turned the ball over. New England's defense then made a key defensive stand, forcing a quick three-and-out, and Julian Edelman returned Steve Weatherford's punt 41 yards to the New York 43-yard line before being tackled by Weatherford himself. Brady then led New England to the 17-yard line where Graham made his second field goal to cut their deficit to 7 points. However, Jets defensive back Antonio Cromartie recovered Graham's onside kick attempt and returned it 23 yards to the Patriots 20-yard line. Then Shonn Greene scored with a 20-yard run on the next play, making the score 28–14 with 1:12 left in the game.

Brandon Tate returned the ensuing kickoff 23 yards to the 41-yard line, sparking a 59-yard scoring drive that ended with Brady's 13-yard touchdown pass to Branch with 24 seconds left. But Graham's second attempt at an onside kick also failed, ending any chance of a miracle comeback.

Brady finished the game 29 of 45 for 299 yards and two touchdowns, with 1 interception. Cotchery had 5 receptions for 96 yards Harris had 9 tackles, 3 assists, and an interception, while Ellis added 5 tackles and two sacks. With this win, the Jets advanced to their second consecutive AFC championship game in Sanchez' first two years as a starter.

With the loss, the Patriots season ended as a one and done team for the second straight year. However, this would be both, the last time the Patriots lost to the Jets at home until 2023, and the last time they failed to make it to the AFC Championship until 2019. Also, as of 2025, this remains the last time New England lost in the Divisional round.

== Final roster ==
2010 New England Patriots roster
Quarterbacks (QB): 12 Tom Brady; 8 Brian Hoyer; Running backs (RB): 22 Thomas Clayton; 42 BenJarvus Green-Ellis; 34 Sammy Morris; 21 Fred Taylor; 39 Danny Woodhead; Wide receivers (WR): 84 Deion Branch; 11 Julian Edelman; 17 Taylor Price; 18 Matthew Slater; 19 Brandon Tate; 83 Wes Welker; Tight ends (TE): 82 Alge Crumpler; 87 Rob Gronkowski; 85 Aaron Hernandez	Offensive linemen (OL): 63 Dan Connolly G; 67 Dan Koppen C; 64 Mark LeVoir T; 72 Matt Light T; 70 Logan Mankins G; 60 Rich Ohrnberger G; 69 Quinn Ojinnaka T; 76 Sebastian Vollmer T; 62 Ryan Wendell C; Defensive linemen (DL): 66 Landon Cohen DE; 71 Brandon Deaderick DE; 74 Kyle Love NT; 91 Myron Pryor NT; 92 Gerard Warren DE; 75 Vince Wilfork NT	Linebackers (LB): 95 Tully Banta-Cain OLB; 96 Jermaine Cunningham OLB; 52 Dane Fletcher ILB; 59 Gary Guyton ILB; 51 Jerod Mayo ILB; 98 Eric Moore OLB; 93 Marques Murrell OLB; 50 Rob Ninkovich OLB; 55 Brandon Spikes ILB; 58 Tracy White ILB; Defensive backs (DB): 27 Kyle Arrington CB; 38 Sergio Brown SS; 28 Darius Butler CB; 29 Tony Carter CB; 25 Patrick Chung SS; 32 Devin McCourty CB; 31 Brandon Meriweather FS; 44 Jarrad Page FS; 36 James Sanders S; Special teams (ST): 5 Shayne Graham K; 48 Matt Katula LS; 14 Zoltan Mesko P	Practice squad: 68 Thomas Austin G; 86 Carson Butler TE; 7 Jonathan Crompton QB; 13 Buddy Farnham WR; 90 Marlon Favorite NT; 10 Darnell Jenkins WR (IR); 65 Steve Maneri T; 43 Thad Turner CB; 35 Ross Ventrone S; Reserve: 45 Josh Barrett SS (IR); 23 Leigh Bodden CB (IR); 97 Ron Brace DE (IR); 33 Kevin Faulk RB (IR); 3 Stephen Gostkowski K (IR); 77 Nick Kaczur T (IR); 26 Bret Lockett FS (IR); 30 Brandon McGowan FS (IR); 61 Stephen Neal G (IR); 90 Darryl Richard DE (IR); 94 Ty Warren DE (IR); 66 Kade Weston DE (IR); 24 Jonathan Wilhite CB (IR); 99 Mike Wright DE (IR); Rookies in italics 53 active, 15 reserve, 8 practice squad

== Awards and honors ==
Recipient	Award(s)
Bill Belichick	2010 Associated Press NFL Coach of the Year
Tom Brady	Week 12: AFC Offensive Player of the Week; Week 13: AFC Offensive Player of the Week; Week 14: FedEx Express NFL Player of the Week; December: AFC Offensive Player of the Month; 2010 Associated Press NFL Offensive Player of the Year; 2010 Associated Press NFL MVP
Dan Connolly	Week 15: AFC Special Teams Player of the Week
Rob Gronkowski	Week 14: Pepsi NFL Rookie of the Week; Week 17: Pepsi NFL Rookie of the Week
Aaron Hernandez	Week 15: Pepsi NFL Rookie of the Week
James Sanders	Week 10: AFC Defensive Player of the Week
Wes Welker	2010 New England Patriots Ed Block Courage Award
Vince Wilfork	2010 New England Patriots Ron Burton Community Service Award

=== Pro Bowl and All-Pro selections ===
Six Patriots were elected to the 2011 Pro Bowl. Quarterback Tom Brady, guard Logan Mankins, and defensive tackle Vince Wilfork were named as starters, while cornerback Devin McCourty, linebacker Jerod Mayo, and safety Brandon Meriweather were named as a reserves. Offensive tackle Matt Light and wide receiver Wes Welker were later named to the game as injury replacements. Brady later pulled out of the game due to surgery for a stress fracture in his right foot.

Brady, Mankins, and Mayo were also voted to the 2010 All-Pro First Team, while McCourty, Wilfork, and offensive tackle Sebastian Vollmer were named to the Second Team.
