= Kyle Love =

American football player (born 1986)

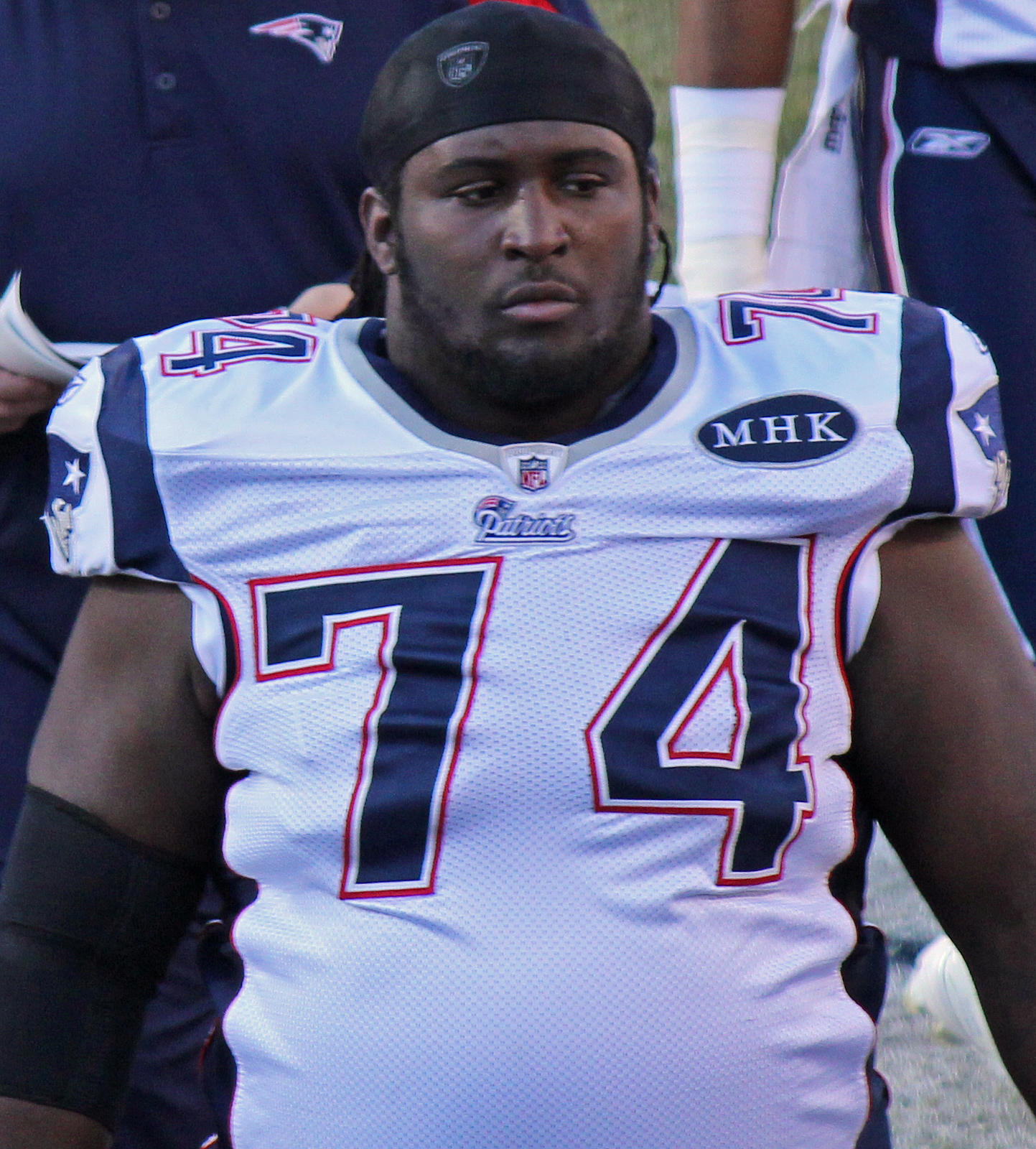
- Love with the New England Patriots in 2011

No. 74, 98, 99, 61, 93, 77
- Position: Nose tackle

Personal information
- Born: November 18, 1986 (age 40); Seoul, South Korea
- Listed height: 6 ft 1 in (1.85 m)
- Listed weight: 310 lb (141 kg)

Career information
- High school: North Clayton (College Park, Georgia, U.S.)
- College: Mississippi State
- NFL draft: 2010: undrafted

Career history
- New England Patriots (2010–2012); Jacksonville Jaguars (2013)*; Kansas City Chiefs (2013); Jacksonville Jaguars (2013); Kansas City Chiefs (2014)*; Carolina Panthers (2014–2019); Tampa Bay Buccaneers (2020)*
- * Offseason or practice squad member only

Career NFL statistics
- Total tackles: 147
- Sacks: 15.0
- Forced fumbles: 4
- Fumble recoveries: 5
- Stats at Pro Football Reference

Alexander Kyle Love (born November 18, 1986) is an American former professional football player who was a nose tackle in the National Football League (NFL). He was signed by the New England Patriots as an undrafted free agent in 2010. Love also played for the Jacksonville Jaguars, Kansas City Chiefs, and Carolina Panthers. He played college football for the Mississippi State Bulldogs.

== Early life ==
Love was born in South Korea, where his father was stationed as an officer in the United States Army. He attended North Clayton High School in College Park, Georgia, where he was a four-year starter on the school's football team as a two-way lineman playing both offensive guard and defensive tackle. He was honored as the team's offensive lineman of the Year in 2003, and as defensive lineman of the Year in 2004. He would have two offers from University of Memphis and Mississippi State University.

== College career ==
Following high school, Love attended Mississippi State University, where he played in seven games as a reserve defensive lineman as a true freshman in 2006, finishing the season with seven tackles. In 2007, Love started 9 of 13 games at defensive tackle, recording 17 tackles, 3.5 tackles for a loss, and a fumble recovery. As a junior in 2008, Love made two starts along the defensive line, appearing in 12 games overall and finishing with 14 tackles and two sacks. Love started 12 games as a senior in 2009, recording a career-high 19 tackles.

== Professional career ==
Pre-draft measurables
| Height | Weight | 40-yard dash | 10-yard split | 20-yard split | 20-yard shuttle | Three-cone drill | Vertical jump | Broad jump | Bench press |
|---|---|---|---|---|---|---|---|---|---|
| 6 ft 1 1/8 in (1.86 m) | 315 lb (143 kg) | 5.33 s | 1.85 s | 3.08 s | 4.98 s | 7.90 s | 28.0 in (0.71 m) | 8 ft 5 in (2.57 m) | 29 reps |
All values from Pro Day

=== New England Patriots ===
==== 2010 season ====
After going undrafted in the 2010 NFL draft, Love signed with the New England Patriots. He became one of two undrafted rookies to make the Patriots' 2010, opening day roster (the other was linebacker Dane Fletcher), and made his NFL debut as a reserve in Week 2 against the New York Jets. He was then inactive until Week 10, when he filled in for an injured Myron Pryor as a defensive line reserve. Love made his first career start in the Patriots' season finale against the Miami Dolphins. He finished his rookie season with seven tackles and one sack in nine games played.

==== 2011 season ====
Love took a bigger role in the Patriots' defense in 2011, as he was active for all 16 games. In the Patriots' 3–4 defense, they often used Love at nose tackle, moving Vince Wilfork to defensive end. He started 13 regular-season games, becoming a regular season in the Patriots' Week 4 game against the Oakland Raiders. Love finished the season with 33 tackles and three sacks; Love played for the Patriots in Super Bowl XLVI in a losing effort New York Giants, he recorded a tackle in the game.

==== 2012 season ====
Love played all 16 games combining with Vince Wilfork as a double defensive tackle combo. Love had 25 tackles and 1.5 sacks during the 2012 season. The Patriots advanced to the AFC Championship for the second straight year but lost to the Baltimore Ravens, 28–13. The Patriots waived Love on May 15, 2013, with a non football injury/illness designation soon after he was diagnosed with diabetes.

=== Jacksonville Jaguars (first stint) ===
Love was claimed off waivers by the Jacksonville Jaguars on May 16, 2013. He was released on September 1, 2013.

=== Kansas City Chiefs (first stint) ===
Love signed with the Chiefs on November 19, 2013. Love was released by the Chiefs on December 3, 2013.

=== Jacksonville Jaguars (second stint) ===
Love was signed once again by the Jacksonville Jaguars on December 23, 2013. During the 2013 season with the 2 teams he played for, he played in 2 total games with 4 tackles.

=== Kansas City Chiefs (second stint) ===
After not being offered a contract by the Jaguars, Love re-signed with the Chiefs on May 19, 2014. He released on August 30, 2014.

=== Carolina Panthers ===
Love signed with the Carolina Panthers on December 15, 2014. He played in the Panthers postseason loss to the Seattle Seahawks and recorded a tackle.

Love appeared in 15 games for the Panthers during the 2015 regular season and tied his career high with three sacks. Love appeared in all three of the Panthers postseason games. He recorded a tackle and a sack in the NFC Championship against the Arizona Cardinals. On February 7, 2016, Love was part of the Panthers team that played in Super Bowl 50. In the game, Love recorded a tackle as the Panthers fell to the Denver Broncos by a score of 24–10.

On September 3, 2016, he was released by the Panthers as part of final roster cuts. He was re-signed on September 27, 2016.

On March 15, 2017, Love signed a two-year contract extension with the Panthers. He played in all 16 games in 2017, recording 16 combined tackles and a career-high 3.5 sacks. In 2018, he played in 16 games with two starts, recording 19 combined tackles, 1.5 sacks, and a career-high three forced fumbles.

On April 15, 2019, Love re-signed with the Panthers.

=== Tampa Bay Buccaneers ===
Love was signed by the Tampa Bay Buccaneers on August 16, 2020. He was released on September 3, 2020.

On March 26, 2021, Love announced his retirement from professional football on Instagram.

== Personal life ==
Love is married.
