= Gary Guyton =

American gridiron football player (born 1985)

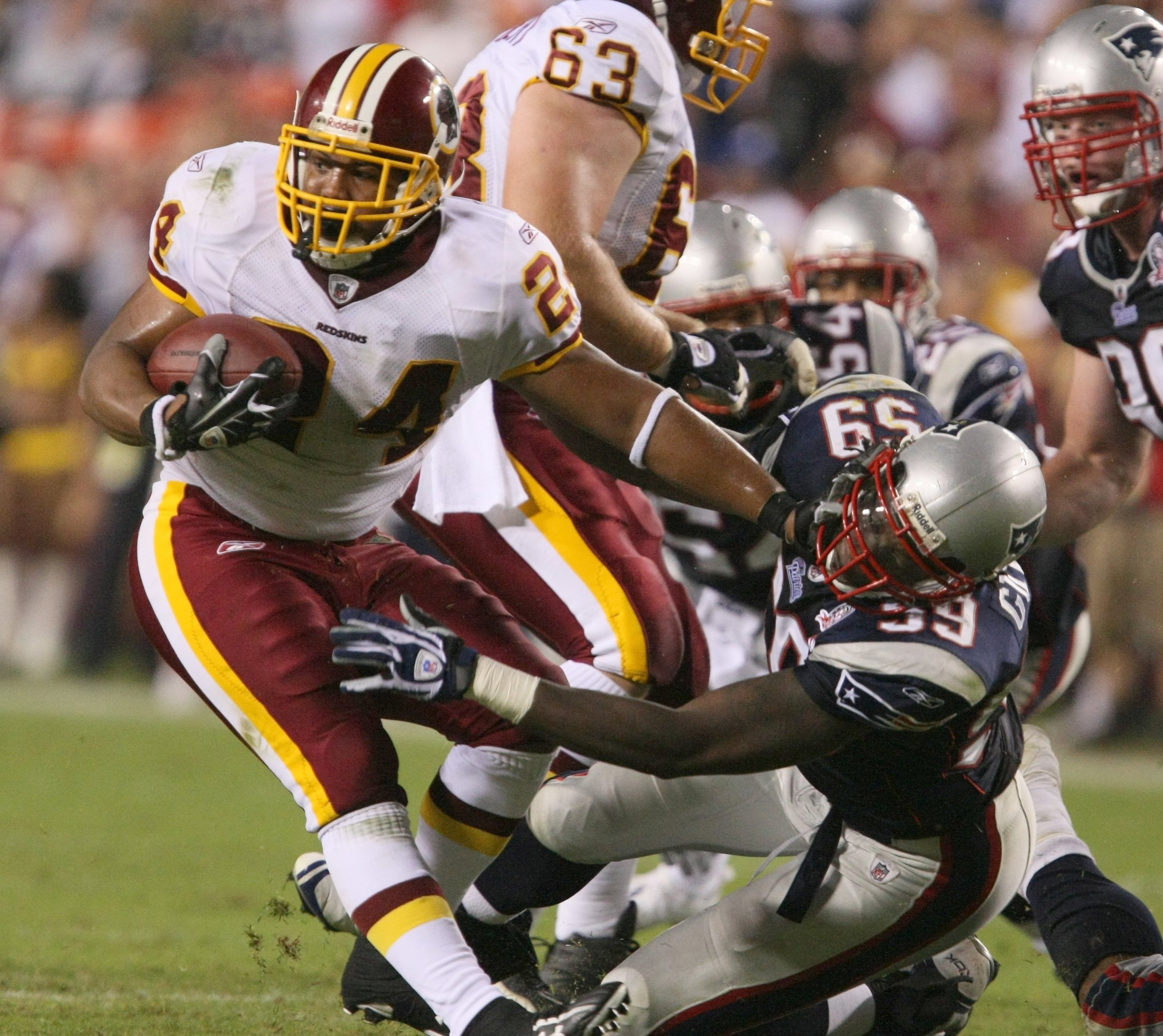
- Guyton (#59) attempts to tackle Marcus Mason (#24) during a preseason game

No. 53, 59
- Position: Linebacker

Personal information
- Born: November 14, 1985 (age 40); Hinesville, Georgia, U.S.
- Listed height: 6 ft 2 in (1.88 m)
- Listed weight: 245 lb (111 kg)

Career information
- High school: Bradwell Institute (Hinesville)
- College: Georgia Tech
- NFL draft: 2008: undrafted

Career history
- New England Patriots (2008−2011); Miami Dolphins (2012)*; Dallas Cowboys (2012); San Diego Chargers (2012); Tennessee Titans (2013)*; Montreal Alouettes (2014)
- * Offseason or practice squad member only

Career NFL statistics
- Total tackles: 229
- Sacks: 4.5
- Forced fumbles: 1
- Fumble recoveries: 3
- Interceptions: 3
- Defensive touchdowns: 2
- Stats at Pro Football Reference

Gary Guyton (born November 14, 1985) is an American former professional football player who was a linebacker in the National Football League (NFL). He was signed by the New England Patriots as an undrafted free agent in 2008. He played college football for the Georgia Tech Yellow Jackets.

== Early life ==
Guyton was born in Hinesville, Georgia. He had 56 tackles, six tackles for loss, three sacks, three fumble recoveries, five pass breakups and a blocked kick and returned two fumbles and an interception for touchdowns as a senior at Bradwell Institute in Hinesville. As a junior, he had 59 tackles with nine sacks, 10 tackles for loss, one interception and a fumble recovery.

== College career ==
Guyton was a two-year starter for the Georgia Institute of Technology. As a freshman in 2004, he saw action in 12 games on special teams. As a sophomore in 2005, he made 19 tackles, one sack and one pass defended. In 2006, he had 29 tackles while making 12 starts at outside linebacker. As a senior in 2007, Guyton finished second on the team in total tackles with 78 while starting all 13 games. He also had five sacks and 14 tackles for a loss.

== Professional career ==
=== Pre-draft ===
Guyton had the fastest 40-yard dash time out of all the linebackers in the 2008 NFL combine with a 4.47 time.

Pre-draft measurables
Height	Weight	40-yard dash	10-yard split	20-yard split	20-yard shuttle	Three-cone drill	Vertical jump	Broad jump	Bench press	Wonderlic
6 ft 1 5/8 in (1.87 m)	245 lb (111 kg)	4.47 s	1.46 s	2.53 s	4.33 s	7.07 s	40 in (1.02 m)	10 ft 6 in (3.20 m)	16 reps	22
All values from NFL Scouting Combine except 40-yard dash, vertical, and broad jump (Georgia Tech Pro Day)

=== New England Patriots ===
==== 2008 season ====
On April 28, 2008, Guyton signed as an undrafted free agent with the New England Patriots. The previous day rumors circulated that Guyton had agreed to terms with the San Francisco 49ers, however confusion arose when 49ers General Manager Scot McCloughan said he would divulge names of undrafted free agents with whom the club had agreed to terms and the following day, Guyton had officially signed with the Patriots.

Guyton, an undrafted free agent, made the Patriots' 53-man roster, and was active for all but one game of his rookie season in 2008, while the Patriots' third-round draft pick Shawn Crable, an outside linebacker, was inactive, and another inside linebacker, sixth-round draft pick Bo Ruud, was placed on injured reserve. Guyton also started two games late in the season after an injury to Tedy Bruschi.

In the Patriots' Week 4 game against the San Francisco 49ers, the Patriots employed multiple nickel and dime defenses that gave Guyton more defensive snaps than fellow rookie inside linebacker Jerod Mayo, the Patriots' 2008 first-round draft pick.

In interviews, Patriots head coach Bill Belichick noted that they had debated drafting Guyton over Ruud, but ultimately chose Ruud; in retrospect, Belichick admitted that the Patriots should have drafted Guyton and undrafted free agent running back BenJarvus Green-Ellis.

==== 2009 season ====
Due to Bruschi's retirement just prior to the start of the season, Guyton would go to start all 16 games for the Patriots in 2009. He began the season as a 3–4 weakside linebacker before the middle linebacker, Mayo, was injured in Week 1. Guyton started at 4–3 middle linebacker for the Patriots in Weeks 2–5, in place of Mayo. Upon Mayo's return, the two started the rest of the season as 3–4 inside linebackers. Guyton finished the season with 85 tackles and 1.5 sacks.

Following the season, the Patriots signed Guyton to a two-year extension worth over $2.1 million, including a $650,000 signing bonus; as Guyton was an exclusive rights free agent, the Patriots were only required to offer him a one-year minimum tender of $470,000.

==== 2010 season ====
Guyton scored his first career touchdown in the Patriots' Week 1 game against the Cincinnati Bengals, on a 59-yard interception return of a Carson Palmer pass. It was the first interception by a Patriots linebacker since the 2008 season. In Week 14 against the Chicago Bears, Guyton returned a second quarter Bears fumble 35 yards for a touchdown.

In 16 games played (eight starts), Guyton recorded 63 tackles, three sacks, two interceptions, and one forced fumble.

=== Miami Dolphins ===
Guyton signed with the Miami Dolphins on April 13, 2012.

=== Dallas Cowboys ===
Guyton signed with the Dallas Cowboys on November 6, 2012. He was released three days later without appearing in a game.

=== San Diego Chargers ===
On December 12, 2012 Guyton signed with the San Diego Chargers.

=== Tennessee Titans ===
On August 11, 2013, Guyton was signed by the Tennessee Titans. He was released on August 30, 2013.

=== Montreal Alouettes ===
On May 16, 2014, Gary Guyton was signed by the Montreal Alouettes.

== NFL career statistics ==
Legend
**Bold**	Career high

=== Regular season ===
Year	Team	Games		Tackles					Interceptions					Fumbles			
Year	Team	GP	GS	Cmb	Solo	Ast	Sck	TFL	Int	Yds	TD	Lng	PD	FF	FR	Yds	TD
2008	NWE	15	2	33	25	8	0.0	**3**	0	0	0	0	3	0	**2**	7	0
2009	NWE	**16**	**16**	**85**	**55**	**30**	1.5	1	0	0	0	0	3	0	0	0	0
2010	NWE	**16**	8	63	44	19	**3.0**	**3**	**2**	**72**	**1**	**59**	**7**	**1**	1	**35**	**1**
2011	NWE	13	6	47	26	21	0.0	2	1	17	0	17	1	0	0	0	0
2012	SDG	1	1	1	1	0	0.0	0	0	0	0	0	0	0	0	0	0
		61	33	229	151	78	4.5	9	3	89	1	59	14	1	3	42	1

=== Playoffs ===
Year	Team	Games		Tackles					Interceptions					Fumbles			
Year	Team	GP	GS	Cmb	Solo	Ast	Sck	TFL	Int	Yds	TD	Lng	PD	FF	FR	Yds	TD
2009	NWE	**1**	**1**	**5**	1	**4**	0.0	0	0	0	0	0	0	0	0	0	0
2010	NWE	**1**	**1**	4	**4**	0	0.0	0	0	0	0	0	0	0	0	0	0
		2	2	9	5	4	0.0	0	0	0	0	0	0	0	0	0	0
