= Ryan Wendell =

American football player and coach (born 1986)

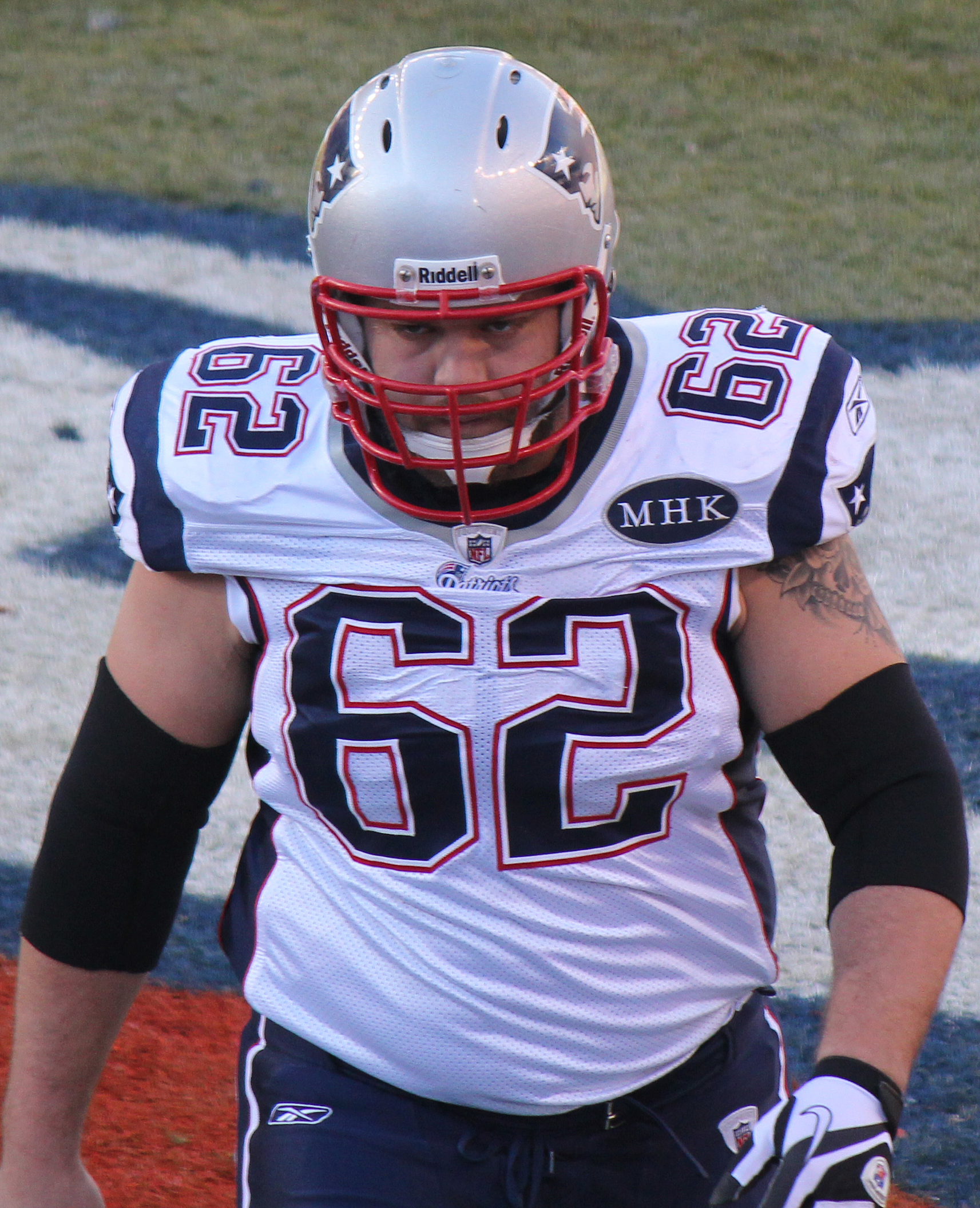
- Wendell with the New England Patriots in 2011

Los Angeles Rams
- Title: Offensive line coach

Personal information
- Born: March 4, 1986 (age 40); Diamond Bar, California, U.S.
- Listed height: 6 ft 2 in (1.88 m)
- Listed weight: 300 lb (136 kg)

Career information
- Position: Center (No. 69, 62)
- High school: Diamond Bar
- College: Fresno State
- NFL draft: 2008: undrafted

Career history

Playing
- New England Patriots (2008–2015); Carolina Panthers (2016)

Coaching
- Buffalo Bills (2019–2022) Assistant offensive line coach; Los Angeles Rams (2023–present) Offensive line coach

Awards and highlights
- Super Bowl champion (XLIX); WAC Co-Freshman of the Year (2004); First-team Freshman All-American (2004); First-team All-WAC (2007)

Career NFL statistics
- Games played: 80
- Games started: 49
- Stats at Pro Football Reference

Ryan Robert Wendell (born March 4, 1986) is an American former professional football player who was a center for the New England Patriots and Carolina Panthers of the National Football League (NFL). He played college football for the Fresno State Bulldogs and was signed by the Patriots as an undrafted free agent in 2008.

== Early life ==
Wendell was born in Diamond Bar, California. He attended Diamond Bar High School where he played football as both an offensive and defensive lineman. His jersey number was retired and he is a member of the school's hall of fame.

== College career ==
After graduating from high school, Wendell attended Fresno State University, where he started in 9 games as a true freshman in 2004 and earned WAC Co-Freshman of the Year. He started all 13 games of his sophomore season and all 12 games of his junior season (the first 8 at guard and the last 4 at center), earning All-WAC honors. As a senior he started at center.

== Professional career ==
Pre-draft measurables
Height	Weight
6 ft 2 1/8 in (1.88 m)	286 lb (130 kg)
Values from Pro Day

=== New England Patriots ===
Wendell was signed by the Patriots as an undrafted free agent on May 1, 2008. He was waived by the team on August 26, 2008, and signed to the Patriots' practice squad on September 24, 2008. He spent the remainder of the season on the practice squad and was re-signed to a future contract following the season.

The Patriots waived Wendell on September 22, 2009. He was re-signed to the team's practice squad two days later. In mid-season, the Patriots raised Wendell's salary in mid-season from the practice-squad minimum (about $150,000) to that of a first-year active-roster player ($310,000). Wendell was promoted to the active roster on December 31, 2009.

Wendell played in 15 games for the Patriots in the 2010 season. He started the final two games of the season in place of an injured Dan Connolly.

During training camp before the 2012 season, Wendell was part of a competition for the starting center job in New England. He beat out longtime Patriot Dan Koppen for the job. In 2012, counting special teams, he played a total of 1,379 snaps, the most of any NFL player. As a result, he earned a bonus of $179,907 from the Patriots in March 2013 as a result of the NFL's "performance-based pay" system, which rewards players who have high playing time and low salaries (his 2012 base salary was $750,000).

On March 28, 2014, Wendell signed a two-year deal worth up to $3.25 million. During the week five 2014 Sunday Night Football game against the Bengals, Wendell was moved to guard, where he enjoyed immediate success on a Patriots team experimenting with their offensive line. The offensive line only allowed one sack the entire game. Wendell started the rest of the year at right guard, and was a part of the offensive line that won Super Bowl XLIX over the Seattle Seahawks.

Prior to the 2015 season, Wendell was voted a captain by his teammates for the first time in his career. He missed the first five games of the 2015 season with an illness and played a reserve role the next two games before being placed on injured reserve on November 7, 2015, ending his time with the Patriots.

=== Carolina Panthers ===
On November 29, 2016, Wendell was signed by the Carolina Panthers after injuries to starting centers Ryan Kalil and Gino Gradkowski.

== Coaching career ==
=== Buffalo Bills ===
In 2019 Wendell was hired as a coaching assistant by the Buffalo Bills and he was elevated to Assistant Offensive line coach for the 2020 season.

=== Los Angeles Rams ===
On February 11, 2023 it was announced the Los Angeles Rams hired Wendell as their offensive line coach.

== Personal life ==
Wendell and his wife Meredith have a daughter named Callie.
