= Jermaine Cunningham =

American football player (born 1988)

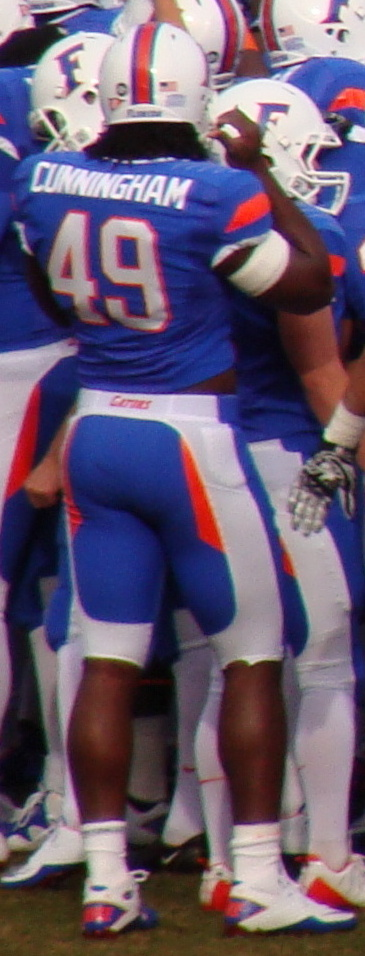
- Cunningham with the Florida Gators in 2009

No. 55, 96
- Position: Linebacker

Personal information
- Born: August 24, 1988 (age 38); Bronx, New York, U.S.
- Listed height: 6 ft 3 in (1.91 m)
- Listed weight: 248 lb (112 kg)

Career information
- High school: Stephenson (Stone Mountain, Georgia)
- College: Florida
- NFL draft: 2010: 2nd round, 53rd overall pick

Career history
- New England Patriots (2010–2012); San Francisco 49ers (2013); New York Jets (2013–2014)

Awards and highlights
- 2× BCS national champion (2006, 2008); 2× Second-team All-SEC (2008, 2009)

Career NFL statistics
- Total tackles: 60
- Sacks: 3.5
- Forced fumbles: 2
- Fumble recoveries: 2
- Stats at Pro Football Reference

Jermaine Alexander Alfred Cunningham (born April 24, 1988) is an American former professional football player who was a linebacker in the National Football League (NFL). He played college football for the Florida Gators, and played for two BCS National Championship teams. He was selected by the New England Patriots in the second round of the 2010 NFL draft.

== Early life ==
Cunningham was born in the Bronx, New York. He attended Stephenson High School in Stone Mountain, Georgia, where he played high school football as a linebacker for the Stephenson Jaguars. He made twenty quarterback sacks as a junior. As a senior team captain in 2005, Cunningham averaged 15 tackles per game and recorded 25 sacks, while helping lead his team to the state semifinal game.

== College career ==
Cunningham accepted an athletic scholarship to attend the University of Florida in Gainesville, Florida, where he played for coach Urban Meyer's Florida Gators football team from 2006 to 2009. As a freshman in 2006, he played in seven games as a defensive end. He went on to start 13 games at defensive end as a sophomore in 2007, recording 64 tackles, 6.5 sacks, and 12 tackles for a loss. During his 2008 junior season, Cunningham started 13 of 14 games and finished second on the team with six sacks, while also picking up ten tackles for a loss and three forced fumbles. As a senior in 2009, Cunningham started 12 games, and missed two with injuries. He finished with 34 tackles and ranked second on the team with seven sacks, while also finishing fifth in the conference with 12 tackles for a loss. Following his junior and senior seasons in 2008 and 2009, he was a second-team All-Southeastern Conference selection, and he completed his college career with five forced fumbles and 19.5 quarterback sacks—tied for tenth on the Gators' career sacks record list with teammate Carlos Dunlap. During his time as a Gator, the team won two SEC Championship Games (2006, 2008) and two BCS National Championship Games (2007, 2009).

== Professional career ==
Pre-draft measurables
Height	Weight	Arm length	Hand span	40-yard dash	10-yard split	20-yard split	Vertical jump	Broad jump
6 ft 3 3/8 in (1.91 m)	266 lb (121 kg)	33 3/4 in (0.86 m)	10 3/8 in (0.26 m)	4.89 s	1.60 s	2.77 s	35 in (0.89 m)	9 ft 10 in (3.00 m)
All values from NFL Scouting Combine.

=== New England Patriots ===
Cunningham was selected by the New England Patriots in the second round (53rd overall) of the 2010 NFL draft. He signed a four-year contract on July 24, 2010. Cunningham made his first career start in the third game of his rookie season, surpassing former starter Tully Banta-Cain, and recorded his first career sack in Week 6 against the Baltimore Ravens. Cunningham started 11 of 16 games played as a rookie, finishing with 27 tackles, one sack, and two forced fumbles.

Cunningham struggled through his second season, recording only one tackle on the season. On a defense that was ranked 31st out of 32 teams, Cunningham was a regular healthy scratch. Cunningham played mostly special teams and rarely saw action in the defensive line rotation.

On November 26, 2012 Cunningham was suspended for violating the NFL performance-enhancing substances policy.

After 3.5 sacks in three seasons, the Patriots cut Cunningham on August 31, 2013, during final roster cutdowns.

=== San Francisco 49ers ===
Cunningham signed with the San Francisco 49ers on October 1, 2013. Cunningham was released by the 49ers on October 29.

=== New York Jets ===
Cunningham signed with the New York Jets on November 20, 2013.

=== NFL statistics ===
Year	Team	GP	COMB	TOTAL	AST	SACK	FF	FR	FR YDS	INT	IR YDS	AVG IR	LNG	TD	PD
2010	NE	15	34	27	7	1.0	2	0	0	0	0	0	0	0	1
2011	NE	9	1	0	1	0.0	0	0	0	0	0	0	0	0	0
2012	NE	12	24	16	8	2.5	0	2	0	0	0	0	0	0	0
Career		36	59	43	16	3.5	2	2	0	0	0	0	0	0	1

== Personal life ==
Cunningham, along with U.S. Olympic track hopeful Xavier Carter and former Gator Jonathan Demps, was arrested in 2007 after an altercation with a Jimmy John's employee. The group became "verbally abusive, struck the employee with empty soda cans and a sandwich, and fled the store" after the clerk asked them to pay for a bag of chips. In late December 2014, Cunningham was charged with multiple counts in Union County, New Jersey.

== See also ==
- List of Florida Gators in the NFL draft
- List of New England Patriots players
