= David King (punter) =

Australian sportsman (born 1981)

Profile
- Position: Punter

Personal information
- Born: 24 August 1981 (age 45); Australia
- Listed height: 6 ft 0 in (1.83 m)
- Listed weight: 200 lb (91 kg)

Career history
- New England Patriots (2010)*
- * Offseason or practice squad member only

David King (born 24 August 1981) is a former American football and Australian rules football player. He was signed by the New England Patriots of the National Football League as a punter on 14 April 2010, but was waived by the team on 11 June 2010.
