= Sebastian Vollmer =

German gridiron football player (born 1984)

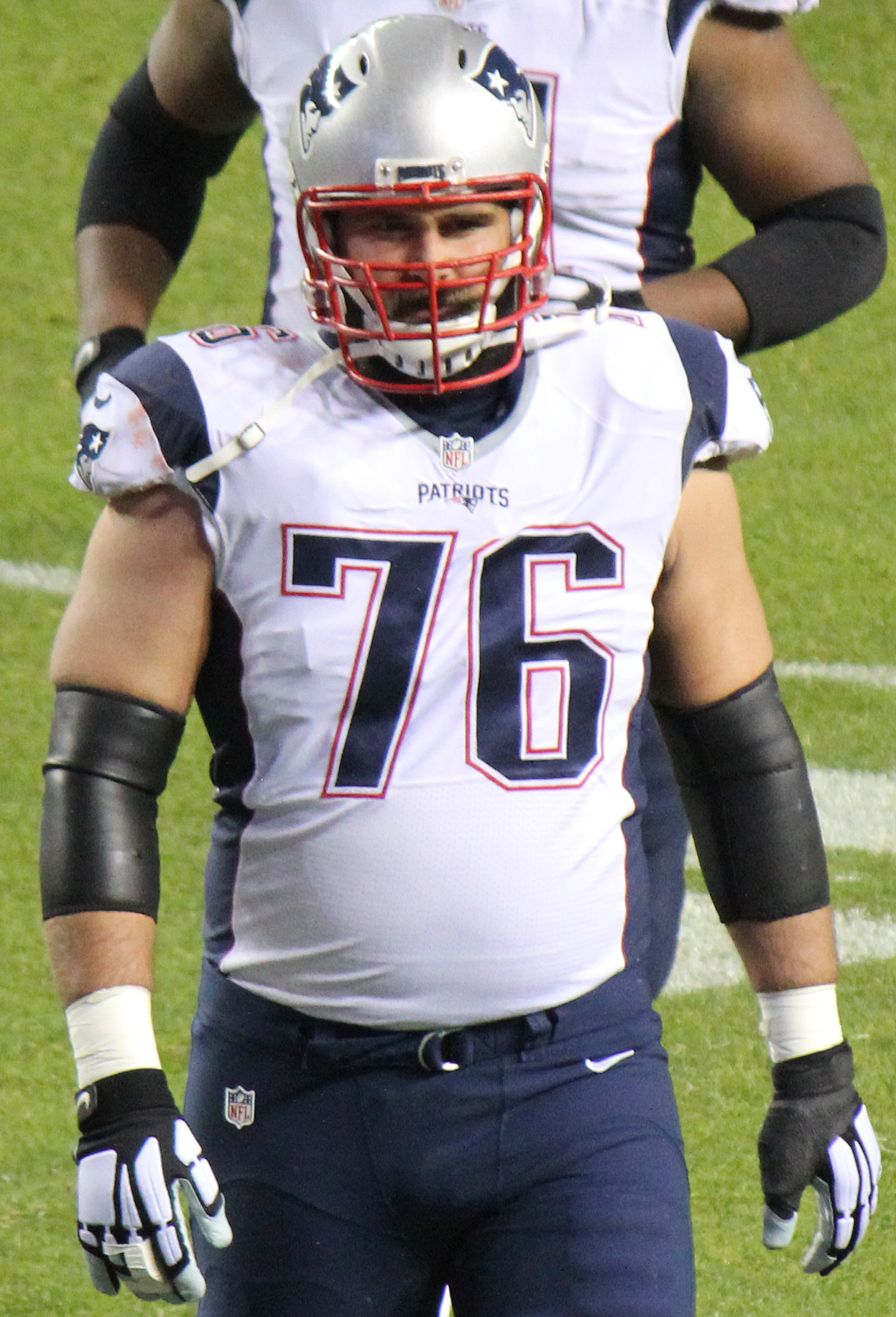
- Vollmer with the New England Patriots in 2015

No. 76
- Position: Offensive tackle

Personal information
- Born: 10 July 1984 (age 42); Kaarst, North Rhine-Westphalia, West Germany
- Listed height: 6 ft 8 in (2.03 m)
- Listed weight: 320 lb (145 kg)

Career information
- High school: Quirinus (Neuss, Germany)
- College: Houston (2004–2009)
- NFL draft: 2009: 2nd round, 58th overall pick

Career history
- New England Patriots (2009–2016)

Awards and highlights
- 2× Super Bowl champion (XLIX, LI); Second-team All-Pro (2010); New England Patriots All-2010s Team; New England Patriots All-Dynasty Team; Madden Most Valuable Protectors Award (2010); First-team All-C-USA (2008)

Career NFL statistics
- Games played: 88
- Games started: 80
- Stats at Pro Football Reference

Sebastian Georg Vollmer (German pronunciation: [zeˈbasti̯a(ː)n ˈɡeːɔʁk ˈfɔlmɐ]; born 10 July 1984) is a German former professional American football player who was an offensive tackle for the New England Patriots of the National Football League (NFL). He played college football for the Houston Cougars and was selected by the Patriots in the second round of the 2009 NFL draft and played his entire eight-year career with the team. He was named a second-team All-Pro in 2010.

== Early life ==
Born in Kaarst, Germany, Vollmer did not start playing American football until he was 14 years old. He attended Quirinus Gymnasium, a secondary school in Neuss, Germany. He played American football for the Düsseldorf Panther and helped his team to a 25–0 record and two national Junior Bowl wins. After appearing in the 2003 Global Junior Championships in San Diego, California, he was recruited by college coaches as a 250-pound tight end.

== College career ==
Vollmer chose to attend the University of Houston, where he played for the Houston Cougars football team beginning in 2004. He redshirted his freshman season in 2004, and appeared in eight games as a reserve tight end in 2005. After requiring back surgery as a sophomore, Vollmer switched from tight end to left tackle, where he started 25 straight games for Houston. At Houston, Vollmer's offensive line coach was Joe Gilbert, who had previously worked at the University of Toledo, where he coached another future Patriots lineman, Nick Kaczur. As a senior, he was named to the first-team All-Conference USA at left tackle.

== Professional career ==
Pre-draft measurables
Height	Weight	40-yard dash	10-yard split	20-yard split	20-yard shuttle	Three-cone drill	Vertical jump	Broad jump	Bench press
6 ft 7 5/8 in (2.02 m)	312 lb (142 kg)	5.13 s	1.77 s	2.90 s	4.50 s	7.51 s	36.5 in (0.93 m)	9 ft 3 in (2.82 m)	32 reps
All values from Pro Day

Vollmer was not invited to the NFL Combine, but did have a private workout with Patriots offensive line coach Dante Scarnecchia prior to the 2009 NFL draft.

=== 2009 season ===
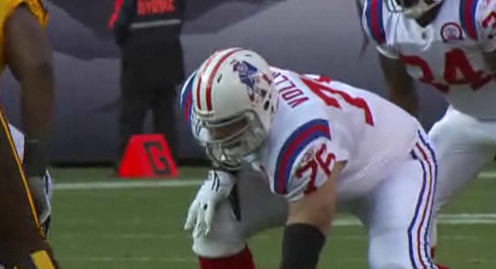
Vollmer in 2009

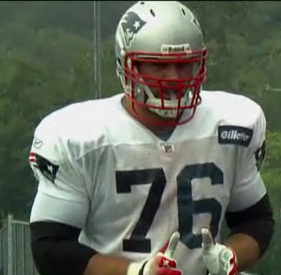
Sebastian Vollmer at minicamp 2009

Vollmer was drafted by the New England Patriots in the second round (58th overall) of the 2009 NFL draft. On 17 July, he signed a four-year contract.

Vollmer made his official NFL debut in the Patriots' first game of the season. He made his first start at left tackle, filling in for an injured Matt Light, in the Patriots' record-setting 59–0 victory in Week 6 against the Tennessee Titans, and started the next four games. After being sidelined for two weeks with a head injury, Vollmer made his sixth start of the season in Week 14 against the Carolina Panthers; Vollmer lined up at both left tackle and right tackle, in place of veteran tackle Nick Kaczur, during the game. Vollmer started the Patriots' next two games after Kaczur was injured, and when Kaczur returned in Week 17, he continued to start at right tackle, including the Patriots' playoff loss to the Baltimore Ravens.

=== 2010 season ===
In 2010, Vollmer started all 16 games of the regular season at right tackle for the Patriots. He was named to the Associated Press 2010 All-Pro Team (2nd team, thus one of the four best tackles—left or right—in the NFL), but was not voted to the 2011 Pro Bowl, as "Vollmer's anonymity kept him out of the Pro Bowl".

=== 2011 season ===
Vollmer injured his back in a preseason game and missed the beginning of the 2011 season. He returned in week 2 and rotated with Nate Solder at right tackle but was injured again in the win over the San Diego Chargers. Vollmer returned in week 8 vs the Pittsburgh Steelers, rotating again with Solder. After another injury, he started in the Super Bowl XLVI loss to the New York Giants.

=== 2012 season ===
Vollmer played and started in all but one regular season game. Vollmer became a free agent after the season. On March 24, 2013, Vollmer signed a new, four-year deal with the Patriots worth up to $27 million, with $8.25 million guaranteed. Achieving the full amount of the contract will require that Vollmer play at least 90 percent of offensive snaps in each year of the contract and, in 2015 and 2016, be active for every game of the season; his total base salary for the four years is $7.75 million.

=== 2013 season ===
On 27 October, in a game against the Miami Dolphins, Vollmer broke his right leg. On 29 October, the Patriots placed Sebastian Vollmer on the season-ending injured reserve list.

=== 2014 season ===
Vollmer played and started in all but one regular season game for the Patriots. He started in Super Bowl XLIX and helped the Patriots defeat the Seahawks to earn his first Super Bowl Championship.

As Markus Koch was drafted 30th overall by the Redskins in 1986 and helped Washington win Super Bowl XXII two years later, Vollmer is often erroneously credited as the first German ever to be selected in an NFL draft, and further, to win a Super Bowl title.

=== 2015 season ===
The Patriots won the first 10 games before injuries took their toll. With Nate Solder out for the season, Vollmer was moved to the left tackle spot, then missed a game due to a concussion.

=== 2016 season ===
Vollmer was placed on the Reserve/PUP list on 30 August 2016 after having shoulder surgery while also dealing with a hip injury. However, due to the seriousness of his injuries, he was never activated off the PUP list, and missed the entire 2016 season. On 5 February 2017, Vollmer's Patriots appeared in Super Bowl LI. In the game, the Patriots defeated the Atlanta Falcons by a score of 34–28 in overtime.

On 3 March 2017, Vollmer was released by the Patriots.

=== Retirement ===
On 16 May 2017, Vollmer announced his retirement from the NFL. At the time of his retirement announcement, he reported he had lost 75 pounds from his playing weight of 320 pounds.

== Post-retirement ==
Following his playing career, Vollmer has been active as a commentator and NFL expert for German television channels ProSieben and ProSieben Maxx as part of the show ran. He has been active as a commentator for the streaming service DAZN since September 2019.

Since 2023, Vollmer has been part of RTL, the 3rd-biggest TV network in Germany, where he is a TV analyst for American football.

His autobiography, titled German Champion: Die Geschichte meiner NFL-Karriere, was published on 8 September 2018.

== Books ==
- German Champion: Die Geschichte meiner NFL-Karriere, with Daniel Hechler (2018)
- What it takes: Talent, Training, Mindset. Wie ich es geschafft habe, in der NFL erfolgreich zu sein, with Daniel Hechler (2021)

== Notes ==
1. "Gymnasium" in Germany refers to a secondary school.
