= Buddy Farnham =

American football player (born 1987)

No. 13, 28
- Position: Wide receiver

Personal information
- Born: May 22, 1987 (age 39); Andover, Massachusetts, U.S.
- Listed height: 6 ft 0 in (1.83 m)
- Listed weight: 185 lb (84 kg)

Career information
- High school: Andover
- College: Brown
- NFL draft: 2010: undrafted

Career history
- New England Patriots (2010–2011)*; Orlando Predators (2012)*; Pittsburgh Power (2012)*
- * Offseason or practice squad member only

Awards and highlights
- co-Ivy League Player of the Year (2009); New England Player of the Year (2009)

Career NFL statistics
- Receptions: 0
- Receiving yards: 0
- Total touchdowns: 0
- Stats at Pro Football Reference

Mark Raymond "Buddy" Farnham (born May 22, 1987) is an American former professional football player who was a wide receiver in the National Football League (NFL). He was signed by the New England Patriots as an undrafted free agent in 2010. He played college football for the Brown Bears, and was a three-time first-team All-Ivy League selection and 2009 co-Ivy League Football Player of the Year.

== High school ==
Farnham played football for Andover High School in Andover, Massachusetts, where he was a three time All-Conference selection and two-time All-State selection.

== College career ==
Farnham was a three-time first-team All-Ivy selection at Brown. He was named 2009 co-Ivy League Football Player of the Year with Penn linebacker Jake Lewko. Farnham finished the 2009 season with 1,003 receiving yards, the eighth receiver in Brown history to go over 1,000 yards. He ranked fifth in the nation in receiving yards per game (100.3), eighth in receptions with 7.4 per game, third in kickoff return yards per return (28.57), and eighth in all-purpose yards (165.10). Farnham led the Ivy League in scoring (7.2 points per game) and punt returns (10.36 per return). He also established a new Brown record for punt return yards in a career (636 yards). For the season, he was first-team All-Ivy as both a wide receiver and a return specialist.

Farnham won the Ivy League Bushnell Cup in 2009.

== Professional career ==
=== New England Patriots ===
After going undrafted in the 2010 NFL draft, Farnham signed with the New England Patriots as an undrafted free agent on May 3, 2010. He was cut on August 9, 2010, and re-signed the next week on August 15. He was again cut on September 4, 2010. He was signed to the Patriots practice squad on December 29, 2010. He was signed to a future contract on January 17, 2011. He was waived again on September 2.

=== Pittsburgh Power ===
On February 29, 2012, the Pittsburgh Power claimed Farnham off reassignment from the Predators. Farnham was reassigned and assigned on March 7, and March 19, 2012, before finally being reassigned on March 26, 2012.

== Personal life ==
Farnham's cousin is NHL player Bobby Farnham.
