= Kade Weston =

American gridiron football player (born 1986)

No. 67
- Position: Nose tackle

Personal information
- Born: November 29, 1986 (age 39); Arima, Trinidad and Tobago
- Listed height: 6 ft 5 in (1.96 m)
- Listed weight: 315 lb (143 kg)

Career information
- High school: Red Bank Regional (Little Silver, New Jersey, U.S.)
- College: Georgia
- NFL draft: 2010: 7th round, 248th overall pick

Career history
- New England Patriots (2010); Indianapolis Colts (2011)*; Pittsburgh Steelers (2012)*; Edmonton Eskimos (2012)
- * Offseason or practice squad member only

Awards and highlights
- Third-team All-SEC (2009)
- Stats at Pro Football Reference

Kade Weston (born November 29, 1986) is a former American football nose tackle. He was selected by the New England Patriots in the seventh round of the 2010 NFL draft. He played college football at Georgia.

== Early life ==
Weston attended Red Bank Regional High School in Little Silver, New Jersey, where he played football, basketball, and was a thrower for the track team. Weston's first year of organized football was 2001 as a high school freshman. As a junior, he recorded 114 tackles, 20 tackles for a loss, 14 sacks, and five forced fumbles, helping Red Bank to a 10–2 record and berth in the Central Jersey Group III State Championship. In his senior season, Weston made 79 tackles and eight sacks, earning all-state honors for a second straight season. He was ranked in Rivals.com's Top 100 national players and was the third-ranked defensive tackle nationally by Scout.com. He was named to Parade magazine's All-American team.

== College career ==
Following high school, Weston attended the University of Georgia, where he redshirted in 2005. As a freshman in 2006, Weston appeared in every game and made six starts, recording 12 quarterback hurries. He was named to the Southeastern Conference All-Freshman team and the national All-Freshman team by The Sporting News following the season. In 2007, Weston played in 13 games, making five starts, and finished the season with 19 tackles. In his junior season in 2008, Weston appeared in ten games and had 18 tackles. As a senior in 2009, Weston started 9 of the 12 games he appeared in, recording 28 tackles and two sacks. Following the season, he was named to the All-SEC third-team.

== Professional career ==
=== New England Patriots ===
Weston was selected by the New England Patriots in the seventh round (248th overall) of the 2010 NFL draft. He signed a four-year contract on July 21, 2010. He was waived/injured on August 23, 2010. He cleared waivers the next day and reverted to the team's injured reserve list.

On August 29, 2011, he was waived by the Patriots.

=== Indianapolis Colts ===
Weston was signed to the Indianapolis Colts' practice squad on October 5, 2011.

=== Pittsburgh Steelers ===
Weston signed with the Pittsburgh Steelers on January 18, 2012. He was released on August 27, 2012.

=== Edmonton Eskimos ===
Weston was signed by the Edmonton Eskimos on October 1, 2012 and played in one game for the team during the 2012 season. He was released on February 13, 2013.
