= Darnell Jenkins =

American football player (born 1982)

No. 10, 84
- Position: Wide receiver

Personal information
- Born: December 31, 1982 (age 43); Miami, Florida
- Listed height: 5 ft 10 in (1.78 m)
- Listed weight: 191 lb (87 kg)

Career information
- High school: Miami Central (West Little River, Florida)
- College: Miami (FL)
- NFL draft: 2008: undrafted

Career history
- Houston Texans (2008–2009); Cleveland Browns (2009)*; Tampa Bay Buccaneers (2009)*; New England Patriots (2009–2011)*
- * Offseason or practice squad member only
- Stats at Pro Football Reference

Darnell Jenkins (born December 31, 1982) is an American former football wide receiver. He was signed by the Houston Texans as an undrafted free agent in 2008. He played college football at Miami.

Jenkins was also a member of the Cleveland Browns, Tampa Bay Buccaneers, and New England Patriots.

== Early life ==
Jenkins attended Miami Central High School in Miami, Florida, where he played football as a wide receiver, defensive back, and kick returner. He recorded 1,500 yards and nine touchdowns as a junior, and 62 receptions for 720 yards and nine touchdowns as a senior. He was a recipient of the Nick Kotys award, given to the Miami-Dade County male athlete of the year, and a two-time all-county selection.

== College career ==
After graduating from high school, Jenkins attended the University of Miami. As a freshman in 2003, Jenkins played in all 13 games as a receiver and kick returner, averaging 20.2 yards on kickoffs, while making three catches and one touchdown. As a sophomore, Jenkins made two starts at wide receiver, and overall played in 12 games. He had 21 receptions for 230 yards and one touchdown, and finished second behind Devin Hester with a 13.6 yard average on kickoff returns. In 2005, Jenkins missed two games with an injury, but in the ten games he played he had 25 catches for 242 yards and two touchdowns. He led the team in kickoff returns and also returned eight punts. Jenkins started the first three games of his 2006 season, recording 13 receptions before tearing his ACL and missing the rest of the season, which he redshirted. He returned in 2007 to record 31 catches for 619 yards and two touchdowns.

== Professional career ==
Pre-draft measurables
Height	Weight	Arm length	Hand span	40-yard dash	10-yard split	20-yard split	20-yard shuttle	Three-cone drill	Vertical jump	Broad jump	Bench press
5 ft 9 1/4 in (1.76 m)	187 lb (85 kg)	31 in (0.79 m)	9 in (0.23 m)	4.52 s	1.53 s	2.60 s	4.26 s	6.86 s	33.0 in (0.84 m)	9 ft 7 in (2.92 m)	13 reps
All values from NFL Combine/Pro Day

=== Houston Texans ===
After going undrafted in the 2008 NFL draft, Jenkins was signed by the Houston Texans on May 8. He was waived by the Texans on August 29, 2008, and signed to their practice squad two days later. He was signed to the Texans' 53-man roster on December 16, where he spent the remainder of the season. He was waived by the Texans again on September 5, 2009, and re-signed to their practice squad for a second straight season. He was released by the Texans on October 22, 2009.

=== Cleveland Browns ===
Jenkins was signed to the practice squad of the Cleveland Browns on October 27, 2009. He was released from it on November 10, 2009.

=== Tampa Bay Buccaneers ===
On November 18, 2009, Jenkins was signed to the Tampa Bay Buccaneers practice squad, but was released from it on December 2, 2009.

=== New England Patriots ===
The New England Patriots signed Jenkins to their practice squad on December 9, 2009. He was placed on the practice squad/injured list on January 6, 2010, and was re-signed to a future contract on January 12, 2010. He was waived by the Patriots on September 4, during final cuts, and re-signed the next day to the team's practice squad. He was placed on the team's practice squad/injured list on November 3, 2010, with a knee injury. Jenkins was re-signed to a future contract for the 2011 season on January 18, 2011. He was waived on August 29.

=== Franklin High School ===
Wide receiver coach for Franklin High School, in Franklin, MA.
