= Bret Lockett =

American football player (born 1986)

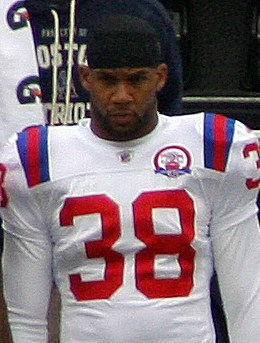

No. 38
- Position: Safety

Personal information
- Born: October 7, 1986 (age 40); San Dimas, California, U.S.
- Listed height: 6 ft 1 in (1.85 m)
- Listed weight: 210 lb (95 kg)

Career information
- High school: Diamond Bar (Diamond Bar, California)
- College: UCLA
- NFL draft: 2009: undrafted

Career history
- Cleveland Browns (2009)*; New England Patriots (2009–2011); Las Vegas Locomotives (2012); New York Jets (2013)*
- * Offseason or practice squad member only

Career NFL statistics
- Total tackles: 7
- Forced fumbles: 1
- Stats at Pro Football Reference

Bret Emanuel Lockett (born October 7, 1986) is an American former professional football player who was a safety in the National Football League (NFL). He was signed by the Cleveland Browns as an undrafted free agent in 2009. He was picked up off waivers to the New England Patriots in 2009 and spent three years on the team. He signed to the New York Jets in 2013. Lockett played college football for the UCLA Bruins.

== Early life ==
Lockett attended Diamond Bar High School in Diamond Bar, California, where he was a three-year starter in football as a safety, linebacker, and wide receiver. As a receiver in 2004, he was a first-team All-Sierra League selection. He also lettered in track and field in 2003.

== College career ==
After graduating from high school, Lockett attended the University of California, Los Angeles, beginning in 2005. He appeared in 12 games as a freshman for the Bruins, contributing on special teams. He saw more time in defense in 2006, recording seven tackles in 13 games played. He made his first start in his junior year in 2007, and totaled 12 tackles over 12 games. In his senior season in 2008, Lockett started 11 games, recording 61 tackles.

== Professional career ==
=== Cleveland Browns ===
Lockett was signed as an undrafted free agent by the Cleveland Browns following the 2009 NFL draft. He was waived by the Browns during final cuts on September 6, 2009.

=== New England Patriots ===
Lockett was claimed off waivers by the New England Patriots on September 7, 2009. He was placed on injured reserve on December 9. He finished the 2009 season with seven tackles over 10 games. Following the season, Lockett was an exclusive-rights free agent before re-signing with the Patriots. He was placed on injured reserve on August 31, 2010, with a chest injury.

He was waived/injured during training camp in 2011. Lockett is expected to miss the 2011 season after tearing his groin in preseason game against the Bucs.

=== New York Jets ===
Lockett was signed by the New York Jets to a reserve/future contract on January 2, 2013. He was released on August 26, 2013.
