= Dane Fletcher =

American football player (born 1986)

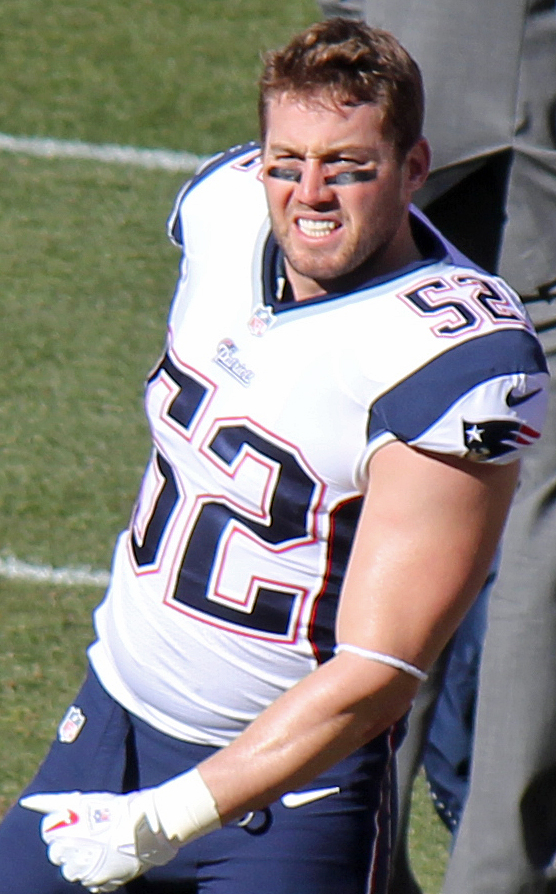
- Fletcher with the New England Patriots

No. 52, 50
- Position: Linebacker

Personal information
- Born: September 14, 1986 (age 40); Bozeman, Montana, U.S.
- Listed height: 6 ft 2 in (1.88 m)
- Listed weight: 245 lb (111 kg)

Career information
- High school: Bozeman
- College: Montana State
- NFL draft: 2010: undrafted

Career history
- New England Patriots (2010–2013); Tampa Bay Buccaneers (2014); New England Patriots (2015)

Awards and highlights
- First-team All-Big Sky Conference (2009); 2009 Big Sky Conference Defensive MVP

Career NFL statistics
- Total tackles: 120
- Sacks: 4.5
- Forced fumbles: 2
- Fumble recoveries: 2
- Interceptions: 1
- Stats at Pro Football Reference

Dane Fletcher (born September 14, 1986) is an American former professional football player who was a linebacker in the National Football League (NFL). He played college football for the Montana State Bobcats, and was signed by the New England Patriots as an undrafted free agent in 2010. Fletcher also played for the Tampa Bay Buccaneers.

== Early life ==
Fletcher was born in Bozeman, Montana and attended Bozeman High School, where he played football as a linebacker and tight end. At linebacker, he was a first-team all-state selection; at tight end, he was an honorable mention all-state selection. He also played ice hockey and baseball as a catcher. Fletcher's parents are well known throughout the Bozeman community and own a local cheese burger joint and a bar.

== College career ==
Following high school, Fletcher attended Montana State University on partial scholarship where he redshirted in 2005. After playing on special teams as a freshman, in 2006. Fletcher played as a defensive end and in 2007 he recorded 51 tackles and three sacks, as well as a Big Sky Conference-high 19 tackles for a loss. In 2008 Fletcher missed three games but finished the season with 6.5 sacks. As a redshirt senior in 2009 Fletcher was named team captain and finished the season with 67 tackles, seven sacks, and two blocked kicks, earning first-team All-Big Sky honors as well as being named the Big Sky Defensive MVP. He was also named as a finalist for the Buck Buchanon Award which is given to the top defensive player in NCAA Division I FCS.

He was also on the Bozeman Icedogs junior hockey team, but decided to focus on football full-time.

== Professional career ==
=== New England Patriots (first stint) ===
After going undrafted in the 2010 NFL draft, Fletcher signed with the New England Patriots. Fletcher became one of two undrafted rookies to make the Patriots' opening day roster, although he was inactive for the first three games of the 2010 season. In Week 4, Fletcher made his NFL debut against the Miami Dolphins. In Week 6, Fletcher saw his first considerable action on defense as a reserve against the Baltimore Ravens. The next week against the San Diego Chargers, Fletcher forced his first career fumble. In Week 15, Fletcher's late-fourth quarter sack of Green Bay Packers quarterback Matt Flynn, the first of Fletcher's career, helped thwart a Packers drive and preserve a Patriots win. Fletcher finished his 2010 rookie season with 23 tackles and two sacks in 13 games played, all as a reserve.

Fletcher missed six games with a thumb injury for the 2011 season, returning in week 13 against the Washington Redskins where he would record his career high of tackles in a game with eight. In Super Bowl XLVI, he recorded one tackle as the Patriots lost to the New York Giants 21-17. He was waived/injured on August 14, 2012, and subsequently reverted to injured reserve. The Patriots re-signed Fletcher for the 2013 season, where he played in 15 games, initially playing mostly on special teams but played more defensive snaps after Jerod Mayo was placed on injured reserve.

=== Tampa Bay Buccaneers ===
On March 16, 2014, Fletcher signed a one-year $1.2 million contract with the Tampa Bay Buccaneers. Fletcher appeared in all 16 games for Tampa and set a career high in tackles with 39. However in the last game of the season Fletcher tore his ACL.

=== New England Patriots (second stint) ===
On May 26, 2015, Fletcher signed with the Patriots for the second time in his career on a one-year deal, however Fletcher would miss the entire 2015 season recovering from an ACL tear suffered at the end of the 2014 season. Fletcher announced his retirement at the conclusion of the 2015 league year and he was subsequently released by the New England Patriots.

== NFL career statistics ==
Legend
**Bold**	Career high

=== Regular season ===
Year	Team	Games		Tackles					Interceptions					Fumbles			
Year	Team	GP	GS	Cmb	Solo	Ast	Sck	TFL	Int	Yds	TD	Lng	PD	FF	FR	Yds	TD
2010	NWE	13	0	23	17	6	**2.0**	1	**1**	0	0	0	**2**	**1**	**1**	0	0
2011	NWE	10	**5**	32	19	**13**	0.0	0	0	0	0	0	0	0	**1**	**1**	0
2013	NWE	15	1	26	15	11	**2.0**	**2**	0	0	0	0	0	**1**	0	0	0
2014	TAM	**16**	4	**39**	**27**	12	0.5	0	0	0	0	0	1	0	0	0	0
		54	10	120	78	42	4.5	3	1	0	0	0	3	2	2	1	0

=== Playoffs ===
Year	Team	Games		Tackles					Interceptions					Fumbles			
Year	Team	GP	GS	Cmb	Solo	Ast	Sck	TFL	Int	Yds	TD	Lng	PD	FF	FR	Yds	TD
2010	NWE	1	0	2	1	1	0.0	0	0	0	0	0	0	0	0	0	0
2011	NWE	**3**	0	**8**	**5**	**3**	0.0	**1**	0	0	0	0	0	0	0	0	0
2013	NWE	2	**1**	5	2	**3**	0.0	0	0	0	0	0	0	0	0	0	0
		6	1	15	8	7	0.0	1	0	0	0	0	0	0	0	0	0

== Personal life ==
Fletcher owns and operates a gym called "The Pitt" in his hometown of Bozeman, Montana. He and his wife Dani welcomed twin boys, Hawkin and Tuck, in fall 2018.
