= Myron Pryor =

American football player (born 1986)

No. 91
- Position: Defensive tackle

Personal information
- Born: June 13, 1986 (age 40); Louisville, Kentucky, U.S.
- Listed height: 6 ft 1 in (1.85 m)
- Listed weight: 305 lb (138 kg)

Career information
- High school: Eastern (Louisville)
- College: Kentucky
- NFL draft: 2009: 6th round, 207th overall pick

Career history
- New England Patriots (2009−2012)

Awards and highlights
- Second-team All-SEC (2008)

Career NFL statistics
- Total tackles: 34
- Sacks: 1
- Forced fumbles: 1
- Stats at Pro Football Reference

Myron Pryor (born June 13, 1986) is an American former professional football player who was a nose tackle in the National Football League (NFL). He was selected by the New England Patriots in the sixth round of the 2009 NFL draft. He played college football for the Kentucky Wildcats.

== Early life ==
Pryor was born in Louisville, Kentucky. He attended Eastern High School in Middletown, Kentucky, where he was voted a Second-team All-State player by the Associated Press. He was also a two-year letterman in wrestling and track and field, where he competed in the discus and shot put.

== College career ==
After graduating from high school in 2004, Pryor attended the University of Kentucky. He tore a pectoral muscle in the weight room and was forced to gray shirt his first year of college. He didn't enroll at UK until spring of 2005, where he started the last two games of his freshman season in 2005. In his sophomore season, he started ten games, recording ten forced fumbles, ranking him among the nation's best in that statistic. He recorded 27 tackles in his junior season in 2007, starting 11 of his team's 12 games. In his 2008 senior season, Pryor was named second-team All-Southeastern Conference. He started 10 games on the season, picking up four and a half sacks, and a touchdown on a 72-yard fumble return.

== Professional career ==
=== New England Patriots ===
Pryor was selected by the Patriots in the sixth round (207th overall) of the 2009 NFL draft. On July 23, 2009, he signed a four-year contract. He was active for 13 games for the Patriots in 2009, recording 20 tackles.

In April 2013, Pryor was released by the Patriots after four seasons, however injuries had kept him out the entire 2012 season and had limited him to two games in the 2011 season.
