= 2012 New England Patriots season =

53rd season in franchise history

- Owner: Robert Kraft
- Head coach: Bill Belichick
- Offensive coordinator: Josh McDaniels
- Defensive coordinator: Matt Patricia
- Home stadium: Gillette Stadium

Results
- Record: 12–4
- Division place: 1st AFC East
- Playoffs: Won Divisional Playoffs (vs. Texans) 41–28; Lost AFC Championship (vs. Ravens) 13–28
- All-Pros: 2: DT Vince Wilfork (1st team); G Logan Mankins (2nd team)
- Pro Bowlers: 7: QB Tom Brady; WR Wes Welker; TE Rob Gronkowski; G Logan Mankins; DT Vince Wilfork; MLB Jerod Mayo; ST Matthew Slater

Uniform
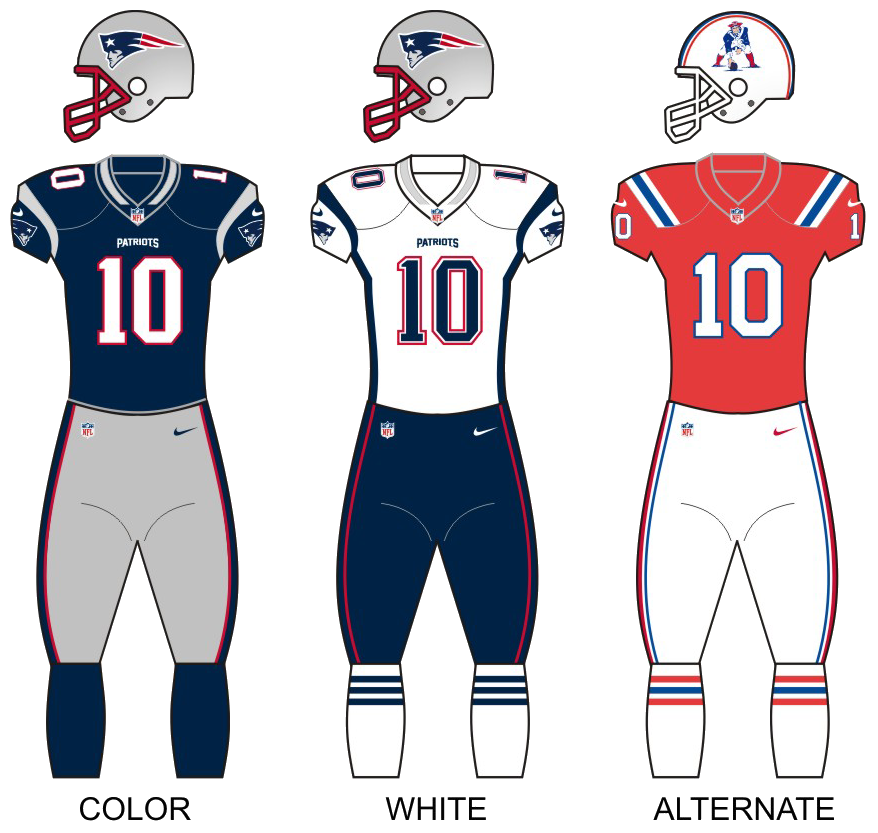

The 2012 season was the New England Patriots' 43rd in the National Football League (NFL) and their 53rd overall. The Patriots did not improve upon their 13–3 record from 2011, finishing at 12–4, but did win the AFC East for the fourth season in a row, and a first-round bye as one of the top two seeds in the AFC for the third consecutive year. This season marked head coach Bill Belichick's 13th season as Patriots head coach, and the 11th season in which the Patriots played all of their home games at Gillette Stadium.

The 2012 Patriots featured a prolific offense that broke the record for first downs in a season, with 444, and finished third all-time in scoring, with 557 points, finishing only behind the 2011 Green Bay Packers and their previous 2007 record setting season. Additionally, this was the third consecutive season that the Patriots exceeded 500 points scored, which tied the record set by the 1999–2001 St. Louis Rams. The Patriots also ranked first in the league with a turnover margin of +25.

The Patriots' 12-win season marked their tenth consecutive 10-win season, a feat exceeded only by the San Francisco 49ers' streak of 16, from 1983 to 1998, and their twelfth consecutive winning season. They defeated the Houston Texans in the divisional round 41–28 before losing to the eventual Super Bowl champion Baltimore Ravens in the AFC Championship game 28–13, marking their first and only AFC title game loss at home. As of 2026, this represents the most recent sweeping the AFC East for the Patriots.

== Offseason ==
On May 15, Wes Welker signed his franchise tender of 1 year for $9.5 million. He was still permitted to negotiate a long-term deal until July 15, which passed, and a new contract was not allowed to be negotiated until the end of the season. Looking for a replacement for Chad Ochocinco, who had struggled during his tenure with the team, the Patriots signed Brandon Lloyd. The Patriots also signed veteran Joseph Addai to replace departing BenJarvus Green-Ellis. When Addai was released, Shane Vereen moved up to the 3 running back split.

=== 2012 NFL draft ===
The Patriots traded their fifth-round selection and a 2013 sixth-round selection to the Cincinnati Bengals in exchange for wide receiver Chad Johnson. They also tried to improve their defense when they traded their fifth-round selection to the Washington Redskins for defensive tackle Albert Haynesworth and their sixth-round selection to the Philadelphia Eagles in exchange for linebacker Tracy White and the Eagles' seventh-round selection. The Patriots also traded two seventh-round selections—one to the Kansas City Chiefs in exchange for safety Jarrad Page, and another to the Minnesota Vikings along with Randy Moss in exchange for a 2011 third-round selection.

2012 New England Patriots Draft Selections
Round	Overall	Player	Position	College
1	21^{[a]}	Chandler Jones	Defensive end	Syracuse
1	25^{[b]}	Dont'a Hightower	Linebacker	Alabama
2	48^{[c]}	Tavon Wilson	Safety	Illinois
3	90^{[d]}	Jake Bequette	Defensive end	Arkansas
6	197^{[d]}	Nate Ebner	Safety	Ohio State
7	224^{[e]}	Alfonzo Dennard	Cornerback	Nebraska
7	235^{[d]}	Jeremy Ebert	Wide receiver	Northwestern

NOTES:

^{^[a]} The Patriots traded up to acquire pick 21 from the Bengals
^{^[b]} The Patriots traded up to acquire pick 25 from the Broncos
^{^[c]} The Patriots acquired the Raiders' second-round selection and a 2011 seventh-round selection in a trade for the Patriots' 2011 third- and fourth-round selections. ProFootballWeekly.com summary
^{^[d]} Third, sixth and seventh round picks from the Packers.
^{^[e]} From Jets through Packers.

== Staff ==
2012 New England Patriots staff
Front office: Chairman/CEO – Robert Kraft; President – Jonathan Kraft; Senior football advisor – Floyd Reese; Director of player personnel – Nick Caserio; Director of college scouting – Jon Robinson; Director of pro scouting – Bob Quinn; Assistant director of college scouting – Monti Ossenfort; Football research director – Ernie Adams; Head coaches: Head coach – Bill Belichick; Assistant head coach/offensive line – Dante Scarnecchia; Offensive coaches: Offensive coordinator/quarterbacks – Josh McDaniels; Running backs – Ivan Fears; Wide receivers – Chad O'Shea; Tight ends – George Godsey	Defensive coaches: Defensive coordinator – Matt Patricia; Defensive line – Patrick Graham; Linebackers – Pepper Johnson; Cornerbacks – Josh Boyer; Safeties – Brian Flores; Coaching assistant – Steve Belichick; Special teams coaches: Special teams – Scott O'Brien; Special teams assistant – Joe Judge; Strength and conditioning: Strength and conditioning – Harold Nash; Assistant strength and conditioning – Moses Cabrera

== Final roster ==
2012 New England Patriots roster
Quarterbacks (QB): 12 Tom Brady; 15 Ryan Mallett; Running backs (RB): 38 Brandon Bolden; 22 Stevan Ridley; 34 Shane Vereen; 39 Danny Woodhead; Wide receivers (WR): 16 Kamar Aiken; 84 Deion Branch; 85 Brandon Lloyd; 18 Matthew Slater; 83 Wes Welker PR; Tight ends (TE): 81 Aaron Hernandez; 86 Dainel Fells; 47 Michael Hoomanawanui	Offensive linemen (OL): 61 Marcus Cannon T; 63 Dan Connolly G; 70 Logan Mankins G; 65 Nick McDonald C; 77 Nate Solder T; 64 Donald Thomas G; 76 Sebastian Vollmer T; 62 Ryan Wendell C; 66 Markus Zusevics T; Defensive linemen (DL): 92 Jake Bequette DE; 71 Brandon Deaderick DT; 98 Marcus Forston DT; 94 Justin Francis DE; 95 Chandler Jones DE; 74 Kyle Love DT; 50 Rob Ninkovich DE; 99 Trevor Scott DE; 75 Vince Wilfork DT	Linebackers (LB): 96 Jermaine Cunningham OLB; 54 Dont'a Hightower OLB; 90 Niko Koutouvides OLB; 51 Jerod Mayo OLB; 59 Mike Rivera MLB; 55 Brandon Spikes MLB; 58 Tracy White OLB; Defensive backs (DB): 24 Kyle Arrington CB; 25 Patrick Chung SS; 23 Marquice Cole CB; 37 Alfonzo Dennard CB; 43 Nate Ebner FS; 28 Steve Gregory FS; 26 Derrick Martin SS; 32 Devin McCourty CB; 31 Aqib Talib CB; 41 Malcolm Williams CB; 27 Tavon Wilson FS; Special teams (ST): 48 Danny Aiken LS; 3 Stephen Gostkowski K; 14 Zoltan Mesko P	Practice squad: 46 James Develin FB; 17 Jeremy Ebert WR; 19 Andre Holmes WR; 69 Colin Miller C; 30 Cyhl Quarles S; -- Tracy Robertson DT; 53 Jeff Tarpinian LB; Reserve: 25 Will Allen CB (IR); 88 Jake Ballard TE (PUP); 30 Josh Barrett SS (IR); 42 Jeff Demps RB (IR); 21 Ras-I Dowling CB (IR); 11 Julian Edelman WR (IR); 42 Tony Fiammetta FB (Left squad); 52 Dane Fletcher MLB (IR); 87 Rob Gronkowski TE (IR); 82 Brad Herman TE (IR); 67 Kyle Hix T (IR); 46 Spencer Larsen FB (IR); 91 Myron Pryor DT (PUP); 71 Jamey Richard C (IR); 19 Donté Stallworth WR (IR); -- Brian Waters G; 16 Shun White WR; Rookies in italics 53 active, 17 reserve, 7 practice squad

== Schedule ==
=== Preseason ===
Week	Date	Opponent	Result	Record	Game site	NFL.com recap
1	August 9	New Orleans Saints	**W** 7–6	1–0	Gillette Stadium	Recap
2	August 20	Philadelphia Eagles	**L** 17–27	1–1	Gillette Stadium	Recap
3	August 24	at Tampa Bay Buccaneers	**L** 28–30	1–2	Raymond James Stadium	Recap
4	August 29	at New York Giants	**L** 3–6	1–3	MetLife Stadium	Recap

=== Regular season ===
Week	Date	Opponent	Result	Record	Game site	NFL.com recap
1	September 9	at Tennessee Titans	**W** 34–13	1–0	LP Field	Recap
2	September 16	Arizona Cardinals	**L** 18–20	1–1	Gillette Stadium	Recap
3	September 23	at Baltimore Ravens	**L** 30–31	1–2	M&T Bank Stadium	Recap
4	September 30	at **Buffalo Bills**	**W** 52–28	2–2	Ralph Wilson Stadium	Recap
5	October 7	Denver Broncos	**W** 31–21	3–2	Gillette Stadium	Recap
6	October 14	at Seattle Seahawks	**L** 23–24	3–3	CenturyLink Field	Recap
7	October 21	**New York Jets**	**W** 29–26 (OT)	4–3	Gillette Stadium	Recap
8	October 28	at St. Louis Rams	**W** 45–7	5–3	Wembley Stadium (London, England)	Recap
9	Bye					
10	November 11	**Buffalo Bills**	**W** 37–31	6–3	Gillette Stadium	Recap
11	November 18	Indianapolis Colts	**W** 59–24	7–3	Gillette Stadium	Recap
12	November 22	at **New York Jets**	**W** 49–19	8–3	MetLife Stadium	Recap
13	December 2	at **Miami Dolphins**	**W** 23–16	9–3	Sun Life Stadium	Recap
14	December 10	Houston Texans	**W** 42–14	10–3	Gillette Stadium	Recap
15	December 16	San Francisco 49ers	**L** 34–41	10–4	Gillette Stadium	Recap
16	December 23	at Jacksonville Jaguars	**W** 23–16	11–4	EverBank Field	Recap
17	December 30	**Miami Dolphins**	**W** 28–0	12–4	Gillette Stadium	Recap

Note: Intra-division opponents are in bold text.

== Standings ==
AFC East
	W	L	T	PCT	DIV	CONF	PF	PA	STK
^{(2)} New England Patriots	12	4	0	.750	6–0	11–1	557	331	W2
Miami Dolphins	7	9	0	.438	2–4	5–7	288	317	L1
New York Jets	6	10	0	.375	2–4	4–8	281	375	L3
Buffalo Bills	6	10	0	.375	2–4	5–7	344	435	W1

== Regular season results ==
=== Week 1: at Tennessee Titans ===
Quarter	1	2	3	4	Total
Patriots	7	14	7	6	34
Titans	3	0	7	3	13

at LP Field, Nashville, Tennessee

- Game time: 1:00 p.m. EDT/12:00 p.m. CDT
- Game weather: 74 °F (23 °C), sunny
- Game attendance: 69,143
- Referee: Jerry Frump
- TV announcers (CBS): Jim Nantz (play-by-play) and Phil Simms (color commentator)

The Titans received the opening kickoff, marching 70 yards to the Patriots 10, converting a 4th-and-1, but the drive stalled at the Patriots 11 and Rob Bironas kicked a 28-yard field goal. Two possessions later, the Patriots raced 67 yards in only 5 plays, scoring on a 36-yard touchdown pass from Tom Brady to Aaron Hernandez. The Titans drove to the Patriots 48 on their next drive, but Jake Locker was intercepted by Tavon Wilson at the Patriots 3-yard line. After Zoltan Mesko pinned the Titans at their own 10, Locker was strip-sacked by rookie Chandler Jones with fellow rookie Dont'a Hightower recovering for a touchdown, increasing the lead to 14–3. After the Titans punted, the Patriots took advantage marching 67 yards in 12 plays, scoring on a 2-yard touchdown pass from Brady to Rob Gronkowski, extending their lead to 21–3, after the play was upheld by replay. The Titans moved the ball well on their next drive, but their drive fell apart and they punted. Brady took a knee and the Patriots kept their 21–3 lead at halftime. The Patriots reached as far as midfield on their next drive, but punted. The Titans zoomed 80 yards on their next drive, scoring with Locker's 29-yard touchdown pass to Nate Washington, trimming the deficit to 21–10. Two possessions later, the Patriots raced 48 yards in 6 plays, scoring on a 1-yard touchdown run by Stevan Ridley extending the lead to 28–10. The Titans drove all the way to the Patriots 6 on their next drive, settling for a 24-yard field goal and trimming the deficit to 28–13. The Patriots countered on their very next drive, reaching the Titans 7, with Gostkowski's 25-yard field goal pushing the lead three scores, 31–13. Four straight incompletions ended any hope of a Titans comeback and Gostkowski kicked a 31-yard field goal. The Titans ran one final play and the Patriots won the game. With the win, the Patriots not only started the season at 1–0 but they also won their ninth straight season opener. Tom Brady threw for 236 yards and two touchdowns, and the defending AFC champion Patriots routed the Tennessee Titans at LP Field by a score of 34–13. Second year running back Ridley for 125 yards and a touchdown on 21 carries and the Patriots offense was nearly flawless. With the win, New England started the season 1-0. This would be the Pats last win in Nashville until 2025.

=== Week 2: vs. Arizona Cardinals ===
Quarter	1	2	3	4	Total
Cardinals	6	0	7	7	20
Patriots	0	6	3	9	18

at Gillette Stadium, Foxborough, Massachusetts

- Game time: 1:00 p.m. EDT
- Game weather: 64 °F (18 °C), partly cloudy
- Game attendance: 68,756
- Referee: David Scott
- TV announcers (Fox): Dick Stockton (play-by-play), John Lynch (color commentator) and Jennifer Hale (sideline reporter)

The Cardinals took the opening possession of the game 60 yards in over six minutes, reaching the Patriots 20-yard line. The Patriots defense clamped down though, and Jay Feely was good on a 38-yard field goal. On the Patriots first offensive play, Brady was intercepted by Patrick Peterson at the Patriots -38 for no gain. The Cardinals failed to get a first down, but Feely was good on a 47-yarder and the Cardinals led 6–0. The Patriots responded on their next drive, driving 47 yards to the Arizona -28 where Gostkowski was good on a 46-yard field goal making the score 6–3. The rest of the quarter was all punts. The Patriots reached the Cardinals 11-yard line later, but eventually settled for a 34-yard field goal, tying the game 6-6 midway through the second quarter. On the sixth play of the Cardinals next possession, Jones forced Williams to fumble with Wilson recovering at the Patriots own 48, setting the Patriots up with good field position to take over, but the Cardinals defense stood strong and the Patriots punted. Both teams got the ball again only to punt for a 6-6 halftime score. The Patriots took the opening possession of the second half 47 yards, but were once again forced to settle for a field goal, this one from 51 yards giving the Patriots a 9–6 lead. Later in the third quarter, Quentin Groves blocked a punt by Mesko and the ball rolled out of bounds at the Patriots 2-yard line. Three plays later, Kevin Kolb threw a 2-yard touchdown pass to Andre Roberts giving the Cardinals a 13–9 lead. The Patriots drove to the Cardinals 30-yard line, but on 3rd-and-6, Danny Woodhead was tackled for a 9-yard loss, and the Patriots punted rather than attempt a 58-yard field goal. On 2nd-and-18 from their own 28, Kolb hit tight end Todd Heap on a screen pass for a 28-yard gain to the Patriots 44 plus a 15-yard unnecessary roughness penalty on Steve Gregory, moving the ball to the Patriots 29-yard line. Seven plays later, Kolb ran in a 5-yard touchdown run less than a minute into the fourth quarter, giving the Cardinals a shocking 20–9 lead. The Patriots reached the Cardinals 39, but on 3rd-and-1, Ridley was tackled for a 4-yard loss and the Patriots punted. After the Cardinals did the same, the Patriots drove to the Cardinals- 35 and Gostkowski connected on a 53-yarder, trimming the deficit to 20–12. After a Cardinals three-and-out, the Patriots marched 82 yards with Brady finding Gronkowski for a 5-yard touchdown pass, trimming the deficit to 20–18. However, Brady's two-point conversion attempt to Gronkowski was incomplete, keeping the Cardinals ahead 20–18 with just 2:06 remaining in the game. With the touchdown pass, Brady moved to 4th all-time by throwing a touchdown pass in 34 consecutive games. With his 46th career 300 yard passing game, Brady moved to 8th all-time. On the Cardinals next drive, Williams fumbled at the Cardinals 35 with Vince Wilfork recovering at the 30, setting up the Patriots nicely. After an incompletion, Woodhead burst for a 30-yard touchdown, but the play was nullified on an offensive holding penalty on Gronkowski. The Patriots reached the 24, but Gostkowski missed a 42-yard field goal wide left with 0:01 left. Kolb took a knee and the Cardinals got the upset win.

With the loss the Patriots fell to 1–1, 10–1 in home openers at Gillette Stadium, and 18–3 against NFC opponents at Gillette Stadium.

=== Week 3: at Baltimore Ravens ===
Quarter	1	2	3	4	Total
Patriots	13	7	7	3	30
Ravens	0	14	7	10	31

at M&T Bank Stadium, Baltimore, Maryland

- Game time: 8:20 p.m. EDT
- Game weather: 67 °F (19 °C), partly cloudy
- Game attendance: 71,269
- Referee: Bruce Hermansen
- TV announcers (NBC): Al Michaels (play-by-play), Cris Collinsworth (color commentator) and Michele Tafoya (sideline reporter)

The Patriots were hoping to stave off a losing streak and rebound from their loss to the Cardinals in this rematch of the AFC Championship.

After both teams initial possession ended in punts, the Patriots drove to the Ravens 19 before settling for a Gostkowski field goal. On the first play of the Ravens' next drive, Steve Gregory intercepted Joe Flacco at the 42 and returned it 36 yards to the Ravens 6-yard line. Three plays later Brandon Bolden ran in a 2-yard touchdown, extending the lead to 10–0. Following another Ravens punt, the Patriots may have missed a chance to put the game away. After driving to the Ravens 27, an offensive pass interference penalty on Rob Gronkowski moved the ball to the Ravens 30. Then, a 19-yard reception on 2-and-11 was nullified by an offensive pass interference penalty moved the ball back to the Ravens 40, eventually ending in a 49-yard Gostkowski field goal, keeping the Ravens in the game. This time the Ravens finally managed a response driving 80 yards to score to score on a 25-yard touchdown pass from Flacco to Torrey Smith, trimming the score to 13–7. On the drive, Jerod Mayo was called for pass interference on 3rd-and-6 and Flacco completed a 14-yard pass on 3rd-and-13. Following a Patriots punt, the Ravens marched 92 yards in over 6 minutes to take a 14–13 lead on a 20-yard touchdown reception by Dennis Pitta. The Patriots took the lead right back marching 81 yards and never faced a third-down, taking the lead on a 7-yard touchdown reception by Edelman for a 20-14 halftime lead. In the second half the Ravens took the opening drive 80 yards and scored on a 7-yard touchdown run by Ray Rice to allow Baltimore to retake a 21–20 lead. Again the Patriots took the lead right back on a 12 play, 78-yard march to take a 27–21 lead on a 3-yard touchdown run by Danny Woodhead. Following a Ravens punt the Patriots drove all the way to the Ravens 2-yard line, but had to settle for a 20-yard field goal, making the score 30-21 early in the fourth quarter. The Ravens proceeded to drive to the Patriots 33, but went for it on 4th-and-1 instead of kicking the field goal and Bernard Pierce was tackled for a loss. The Ravens forced a punt and Flacco engineered a 92-yard touchdown drive to trim the lead to 30–28 with a 5-yard touchdown pass to Smith. On the Patriots ensuing possession, Brady was intercepted by Ladarius Webb, but Webb was flagged for illegal contact and the Patriots retained possession. They reached the Ravens 44, but on 2nd-and-9, Brady was sacked for a 7-yard loss moving the ball back to the Patriots 49, and his 3rd-down pass was incomplete, forcing a punt. Taking over at their own 21 with 1:55 to go, Flacco hit Jacoby Jones for a 24-yard gain. Baltimore was able to reach the Patriots 34 where Flacco threw an incompletion on 3rd-and-9, but Devin McCourty was flagged for pass interference, moving the ball to the 7-yard line. Justin Tucker kicked a field goal that appeared to miss wide right, but was controversially ruled good and the Ravens won 31–30.

With this loss New England fell to 1–2. The Ravens not only avenged the AFC Championship defeat by winning their first-ever regular season meeting against their opponent, but the Patriots faced their first sub-.500 record in 145 games since starting the 2003 season 0–1 against the Buffalo Bills, and also stumbled to their first 1–2 start since 2001. This was the fourth time in the previous ten seasons the Pats had lost consecutive games. Also, in what turned out to be the replacement officials' next-to-last game officiating, the game was marred by a series of questionable calls that eventually provoked the Ravens fans to start chanting derogatory words towards the referees; Patriots coach Bill Belichick was seen to try to grab one of the officials as they were scurrying from the field. The Patriots were one of six 2011 season playoff teams to be under .500 after their first three games; the others were the Steelers, Broncos, Lions, Packers, and Saints (who were sitting at 0–3 by this time).

=== Week 4: at Buffalo Bills ===
Rivalry

Quarter	1	2	3	4	Total
Patriots	7	0	14	31	52
Bills	0	14	7	7	28

at Ralph Wilson Stadium, Orchard Park, New York

- Game time: 1:00 p.m. EDT
- Game weather: 59 °F (15 °C), Wind 7N, Overcast
- Game attendance: 69,402
- Referee: John Parry
- TV announcers (CBS): Greg Gumbel (play-by-play) and Dan Dierdorf (color commentator)

Coming off their loss to the Ravens, the Patriots looked to get back to .500 against the lowly Bills.

The Bills moved the ball well on their opening drive, reaching the Patriots 38, but were forced to punt. The Patriots stormed 90 yards in 7 plays, scoring on a 6-yard touchdown run by Ridley, giving the Patriots an early 7–0 lead. Mayo intercepted Ryan Fitzpatrick on the Bills ensuing drive, but the Patriots punted. After another Fitzpatrick interception, the Patriots drove to the Bills 31, but Gostkowski missed a 49-yard field goal. Two possessions later, Gronkowski lost a fumble with the Jairus Byrd recovering at the Patriots 24. On the very first play, Fitzpatrick connected with Scott Chandler for a 24-yard touchdown pass, tying the game 7-7. Starting at their own 19, the Patriots drove to the Bills 24, but Gostkowski missed a 42-yarder, keeping the game tied. The Bills took advantage, racing 62 yards in just 5 plays, scoring on another touchdown pass to Chandler, taking a 14–7 lead. Welker was stripped by Byrd on the Patriots next drive with Bryan Scott returning it to the Patriots 21. Four plays later, the Bills coughed it up themselves with Fred Jackson losing it at the Patriots 4. The Patriots ran out the rest of the clock, sending the game to halftime down 14–7. After a Patriots punt, the Bills raced 83 yards in just 5 plays, with Ryan Fitzpatrick bombing a 68-yard touchdown pass to Donald Jones, widening the lead to 21–7. The Patriots answered on their next drive, storming 80 yards in 8 plays with Woodhead taking a 17-yard screen pass to the house, trimming the deficit to 21–14. After a Bills punt, the Patriots constructed an 8 play, 85-yard drive, scoring on a 4-yard touchdown run by Brady, tying the game 21-21. After another Bills punt, the Patriots raced 63 more yards in just 5 plays, taking the lead on Brady's 28-yard touchdown pass to Gronkowski. All of a sudden down 28–21, the situation only got worse for the Bills when C. J. Spiller lost a fumble at the Bills 37 and the Patriots recovering. Six plays later, Ridley scored on a 2-yard touchdown run, increasing the lead to 35–21. On the fourth play of the Bills next drive, McCourty intercepted Fitzpatrick at the Bills 46 and returning it 34 yards to the Bills 12. Two plays later, Brandon Bolden scored on a 7-yard touchdown run, putting the Patriots up 42–21. The Bills finally scored again on their next drive, racing 80 yards in 11 plays, scoring on a 35-yard touchdown pass to Brad Smith, trimming the deficit to 42–28. After recovering the onside kick attempt at the Bills 48, the Patriots raced 52 yards in 6 plays, with Brady hitting Lloyd on a 25-yard touchdown pass, putting the game out of reach late in the fourth quarter. Fitzpatrick threw his fourth interception of the game to Tavon Wilson on the next drive, with Wilson returning it 22 yards to the Bills 19. The Patriots reached the Bills 13, and Gostkowski added a 31-yard field goal, making the final score 52–28.

In the win, the Patriots became only the second team in NFL history—after the 2008 Green Bay Packers—to have two players with 100 yards receiving (Welker and Gronkowski) and two players with 100 yards rushing (Bolden and Ridley) in the same game. Brady threw for 340 yards and 3 touchdowns while Bolden (137 yards, 1 touchdown) and Ridley (106 yards, 2 touchdowns) chimed in to make it the most points the Patriots had scored since 2009 as the team improved to 2–2.

=== Week 5: vs. Denver Broncos ===
Quarter	1	2	3	4	Total
Broncos	0	7	7	7	21
Patriots	7	10	14	0	31

at Gillette Stadium, Foxborough, Massachusetts

- Game time: 4:25 p.m. EDT
- Game weather: 54 °F (12 °C), showers
- Game attendance: 68,756
- Referee: Gene Steratore
- TV announcers (CBS): Jim Nantz (play-by-play) and Phil Simms (color commentator)

Coming off their win in Buffalo against the Bills, the Patriots returned to Foxborough to host the Denver Broncos. This was the 13th Brady-Manning meeting between quarterbacks since 2001, and the 17th overall meeting between Manning and the Patriots.

The Broncos started off strong, driving to their own 47, but after a 43-yard completion to Demaryius Thomas, Sterling Moore (the AFC Championship game hero from the year before) punched the ball loose, recovered, and returned it 14 yards to the Patriots 17. Two possessions later, the Patriots marched 84 yards in 12 plays, drawing first blood on an 8-yard touchdown pass to Welker. The Broncos countered, driving 80 yards in 10 plays. On 3rd-and-6, Manning threw an incomplete pass intended for Eric Decker, but McCourty was called for pass interference, moving the ball to the 1-yard line. On the very next play, Manning hit Joel Dreessen for a 1-yard touchdown pass a few plays into the second quarter. However, the Patriots reeled off 24 unanswered points. The ambush began on the Patriots ensuing possession, with the Patriots marching 80 yards in 14 plays, scoring on Vereen's 1-yard rushing touchdown. Following a Broncos punt, the Patriots marched on a marathon 16 play, 93-yard drive to the Broncos 1-yard line, but on 3rd-and-goal Brandon Bolden was tackled for a 4-yard loss by Von Miller and the Patriots settled for a 23-yard field goal by Gostkowski, increasing their lead to 17–7. Manning took a knee and the game went to halftime. After both teams punted to open the second half, the Patriots drained the Broncos already tired defense for a 16 play 95-yard drive, scoring on a 1-yard quarterback sneak, widening the lead to 24–7. On the first play of the Broncos next drive, Manning was strip-sacked by Ninkovich with Wilfork recovering at the Broncos 14. After two penalties, Ridley scored on an 8-yard touchdown, making the score 31-7 and the anticipated tight game a blowout. The Broncos responded by racing 90 yards in 10 plays with Manning throwing a 2-yard touchdown pass to Decker, trimming the deficit to 31–14. Early in the 4th quarter, the Patriots drove to the Broncos 46, but back-to-back sacked by Derek Wolfe and Miller, respectively forced the Patriots to punt. The Broncos drove to the Patriots 47, but turned the ball over on downs when Manning threw an incomplete pass on 4th-and-1. The Patriots responded by driving to the Patriots 37, but Brady was sacked by Elvis Dumervil for an 11-yard loss on 4th-and-5, with Nate Solder recovering Brady's fumble, preventing it from becoming a disaster. The Broncos took over at the Patriots 43 and raced 43 yards in 6 plays, scoring on a 5-yard touchdown pass to Brandon Stokley, closing the gap to 31–21 with 6:43 remaining. The Patriots next drive lasted only three plays: a 4-yard rush by Ridley (which set a new career in high in rushing yards with 129), a 20-yard run by Ridley on the next play, and Miller stripping Ridley with Mike Adams recovering at Broncos 32. The Broncos stormed to the Patriots 14-yard line in just 5 plays, but Willis McGahee was stripped by Ninkovich with Jermaine Cunningham recovering with 3:48 remaining, halting the Broncos' rally attempt. The Patriots subsequently ran out the clock and won the game.

Tom Brady improved his head-to-head record against Peyton Manning to 9–4. With the QB battle between Tom Brady and Peyton Manning renewed, the Patriots took the first game and improved to 3–2.

=== Week 6: at Seattle Seahawks ===
Quarter	1	2	3	4	Total
Patriots	7	10	3	3	23
Seahawks	10	0	0	14	24

at CenturyLink Field, Seattle, Washington

- Game time: 4:05 p.m. EDT/1:05 p.m. PDT
- Game weather: 63 °F (17 °C), cloudy
- Game attendance: 68,137
- Referee: Clete Blakeman
- TV announcers (CBS): Ian Eagle (play-by-play) and Dan Fouts (color commentator)

Coming off their win against Denver, the Patriots flew to Seattle to play their only game on the west coast of the season.

After a Patriots punt, the Seahawks drove all the way to the Patriots 9, but ended up forcing to settle for a 34-yard field goal by Steven Hauschka. The Patriots responded, racing 82 yards in 6 plays, scoring on a 46-yard touchdown bomb from Brady to Welker. Seattle countered with a touchdown of their own, racing 85 yards in 7 plays, scoring on a 24-yard touchdown pass from rookie Russell Wilson to Doug Baldwin, taking a 10–7 lead. The Patriots countered again, going 80 yards in 15 plays, scoring on a 8-yard touchdown pass to Hernandez, retaking the lead 14–10. Seattle drove to the Patriots 48 on their next drive, but Chandler Jones strip-sacked Wilson with Ninkovich recovering at the Seahawks 47. After starting the first half with a 17–10 lead, the Patriots score only two field goals in the second half. The Patriots drove to the Seahawks' 6, but settled for a 24-yard field goal by Gostkowski, increasing their lead to 17–10. The Seahawks turned the ball over at their own 38 with less than a minute remaining in the half, and the Patriots drove to the Seahawks' 3, but an intentional grounding penalty cost the Patriots points, sending the game to the half 17–10. After a Seahawks punt, the Patriots drove to the Seahawks' 17, and Gostkowski increased the lead to 20–10 on a 35-yard field goal by Gostkowski. After a Seattle punt, the Patriots drove to the Seahawks' 43, but Brady was intercepted by Richard Sherman at the Seahawks 20. After a Seahawks three-and-out, the Patriots drove to the Seahawks 6, but Brady was intercepted again at the 3, this time by Earl Thomas who returned it 20 yards to the Seahawks 23. On the third play of the Seahawks' next drive, Wilson hit Zach Miller for a 7-yard gain, but fumbled with Mayo recovering at the Patriots 30. The Patriots drove to the Seattle 17, settling for a 35-yard field goal by Gostkowski, extending the Patriots lead to 23-10 midway through the fourth quarter. On the first play of the Seahawks' next drive, Wilson hit Golden Tate for a 51-yard gain, with a 15-yard unnecessary roughness penalty on Spikes, moving the ball to the Patriots 17. Four plays later, Wilson threw a 10-yard touchdown pass to Braylon Edwards with 7:21 remaining, trimming the deficit to 23–17. Later in the fourth, after forcing the Patriots to go three and out, Leon Washington got the ball to the Seahawks 43 with a 25-yard return. On the fourth play of the Seahawks' drive, Wilson hit Sidney Rice for a 46-yard touchdown bomb, giving the Seahawks a 24–23 lead with 1:18 remaining. On the second play of the Patriots next drive, Jason Jones sacked Brady for a 7-yard loss. Two plays later on 4th down, Brady completed a pass to Welker for 15 yards, but it was 2 yards short of a first down, giving the Seahawks the ball. Wilson kneed twice and the Seahawks got the surprising win. With the loss, the Patriots fell to 3–3. The loss also left them 0–2 against the NFC West.

=== Week 7: vs. New York Jets ===
Rivalry

Quarter	1	2	3	4	OT	Total
Jets	7	3	3	13	0	26
Patriots	14	2	7	3	3	29

at Gillette Stadium, Foxborough, Massachusetts

- Game time: 4:25 p.m. EDT
- Game weather: 62 °F (17 °C), partly cloudy
- Game attendance: 68,752
- Referee: Jeff Triplette
- TV announcers (CBS): Jim Nantz (play-by-play) and Phil Simms (color commentator)

Looking to bounce back from a loss the previous week, the Patriots played a wild back-and-forth game against the rival Jets in their only overtime contest of the season.

The Patriots marched deep into their own territory on the opening drive of the game, but were forced to punt. The Jets responded with an 11 play, 75-yard drive, aided by a defensive holding penalty on Ras-I Dowling giving the Jets a first down, and scoring on a Shonn Greene 1-yard touchdown run. Devin McCourty returned the ensuing kickoff 104 yards for a touchdown. After a Jets three-and-out, the Patriots raced 58 yards in 7 plays, scoring on Brady's 17-yard touchdown pass to Gronkowski, taking a 14–7 lead. Two possessions later, Mark Sanchez fumbled the snap and kicked the ball out of the end zone for a safety, increasing the Patriots lead to 16-7 early in the second quarter. After a Patriots punt, the Jets drove to the Patriots 36, but Sanchez was intercepted by Dennard at the Patriots 2 for no gain. The Patriots drove to the Jets 45, but punted, as well. Starting at their own 5, the Jets raced to the Patriots 36, and Nick Folk nailed a 54-yard field goal, trimming the deficit to 16–10 at halftime. Joe McKnight returned the kickoff 37 yards to the Jets 32. With the decent starting field position, the Jets drove 66 yards to the Patriots 3, but the Patriots defense stiffened and forced the Jets to settle for Folk's 21-yard field goal, trimming the deficit to just 16–13. The Patriots countered on their next drive, putting together a 15 play, 67-yard drive in just under six minutes, converting three third-downs, and scoring on a two-yard touchdown pass from Brady to Gronkowski, extending the lead to 23–13. Two possessions later, the Jets engineered a 14 play, 91-yard drive, converting three third-downs, scoring on a 7-yard touchdown pass from Sanchez to Dustin Keller, trimming the deficit to 23–20. After a Patriots three-and-out, the Jets marched to the Patriots 25 and Folk tied the game with his 43-yard field goal. The situation turned to disaster for the Patriots when Lex Hilliard forced McCourty to fumble and Asher Allen recovered at the Patriots 18. Hightower sacked Sanchez for a 10-yard loss on third down and Folk kicked a 43-yard field goal, giving the Jets a 26–23 lead. Starting at their own 21, the Patriots marched 54 yards to the Jets 25 and Gostkowski tied the game on his 43-yard field goal as time expired. The Patriots received their opening kickoff of overtime, marching 54 yards to the Jets 30 and Gostkowski gave the Patriots the 29–26 lead on a 48-yard field goal. The Jets reached their own 40, but on 2nd-and-10, Sanchez was sacked by Ninkovich and Jermaine Cunningham with Ninkovich recovering and sealing the win. With the win, the Patriots improved to 4–3.

=== Week 8: at St. Louis Rams ===
NFL International Series

Quarter	1	2	3	4	Total
Patriots	7	21	10	7	45
Rams	7	0	0	0	7

at Wembley Stadium, London, England

- Game time: 1:00 p.m. EDT/5:00 p.m. GMT
- Game weather: 49 °F (9 °C), mostly cloudy
- Game attendance: 84,004
- Referee: Walt Coleman
- TV announcers (CBS): Jim Nantz (play-by-play) and Phil Simms (color commentator)

The Patriots faced the St. Louis Rams in London in a rematch of Super Bowl XXXVI. This time, the matchup proved lopsided.

After receiving the opening kickoff, short passes to Steven Jackson and Austin Pettis moved the ball to the Rams 44. Next, back-to-back Jackson rushes moved the ball to midfield. On the next play Sam Bradford threw a 50-yard touchdown strike to Chris Givens for a 7–0 lead. The Rams didn't score again. The Patriots countered on their next drive, marching 77 yards in 8 plays, scoring on a 19-yard touchdown pass to Lloyd. Brady extended his streak of consecutive games with a touchdown pass to 40 behind Johnny Unitas and Drew Brees. After a Rams punt, the Patriots marched 84 yards in 9 plays, scoring on a 1-yard touchdown run by Vereen on 4th-and-goal. After another punt the Patriots began to put the game away. Taking over at their own 22, aided by a 32-yard screen to Gronkowski on 3rd-and-4, the Patriot raced 78 yards in 9 plays with Brady throwing a 7-yard touchdown pass to Gronkowski, increasing the lead to 21–7. Gronkowski celebrated the touchdown by acting like a castle guard before spiking the ball. The Rams drove to the Patriots 35 on their next drive, but attempted a fake field goal that resulted in a 9-yard loss. The Patriots wasted no time, racing 56 yards in 9 plays, scoring on a 1-yard touchdown run by Ridley with just :10 seconds left in the half. Bradford took a knee and the game went to halftime with the Patriots winning 28–7. The Patriots continued to speed up against a tired Rams defense in the second half. Taking the opening drive, the Patriots raced 80 yards in just 6 plays with Brady throwing a 9-yard touchdown pass to Lloyd, blowing the game open 35–7. The Rams offense continued to show no signs of life, going three-and-out again and he Patriots took advantage, driving 58 yards to the Rams 35 and Gostkowski increased the lead to 38–7 on his 53-yard field goal. After both teams punted on their next drive, the Rams drove to the Patriots 41, but turned the ball over on downs. The Patriots moved quickly again, driving 55 yards and scoring on Brady's 14-yard touchdown pass to Gronkowski. With the game out of reach, the Rams drove to the Patriots 25 on their next drive, but Dennard intercepted Bradford at the 4 and returned it 8 yards to the 12. The Patriots punted on their next drive, and the Rams responded by driving to the Patriots 15, but Tavon Wilson intercepted Kellen Clemens at the 1-yard line and returned it 45 yards to the Patriots 46. Ryan Mallett took three knees and the game was over.

Brady threw for 304 yards and 4 touchdowns, 2 each to Lloyd and Gronkowski. The Patriots improved to 2–0 in games played in London, having defeated the Tampa Bay Buccaneers there in 2009. With the huge win, the Patriots went into their bye week at 5–3, but only 1–2 against the NFC West.

=== Week 9 Bye Week ===
On November 1 in a deadline deal, New England shipped a 2013 4th round pick to the Tampa Bay Buccaneers for cornerback Aqib Talib and a 2013 7th round pick.

=== Week 10: vs. Buffalo Bills ===
Rivalry

Quarter	1	2	3	4	Total
Bills	0	17	7	7	31
Patriots	10	14	7	6	37

at Gillette Stadium, Foxborough, Massachusetts

- Game time: 1:00 p.m. EST
- Game weather: 60 °F (16 °C), sunny
- Game attendance: 68,756
- Referee: Bill Leavy
- TV announcers (CBS): Ian Eagle (play-by-play) and Dan Fouts (color commentator)

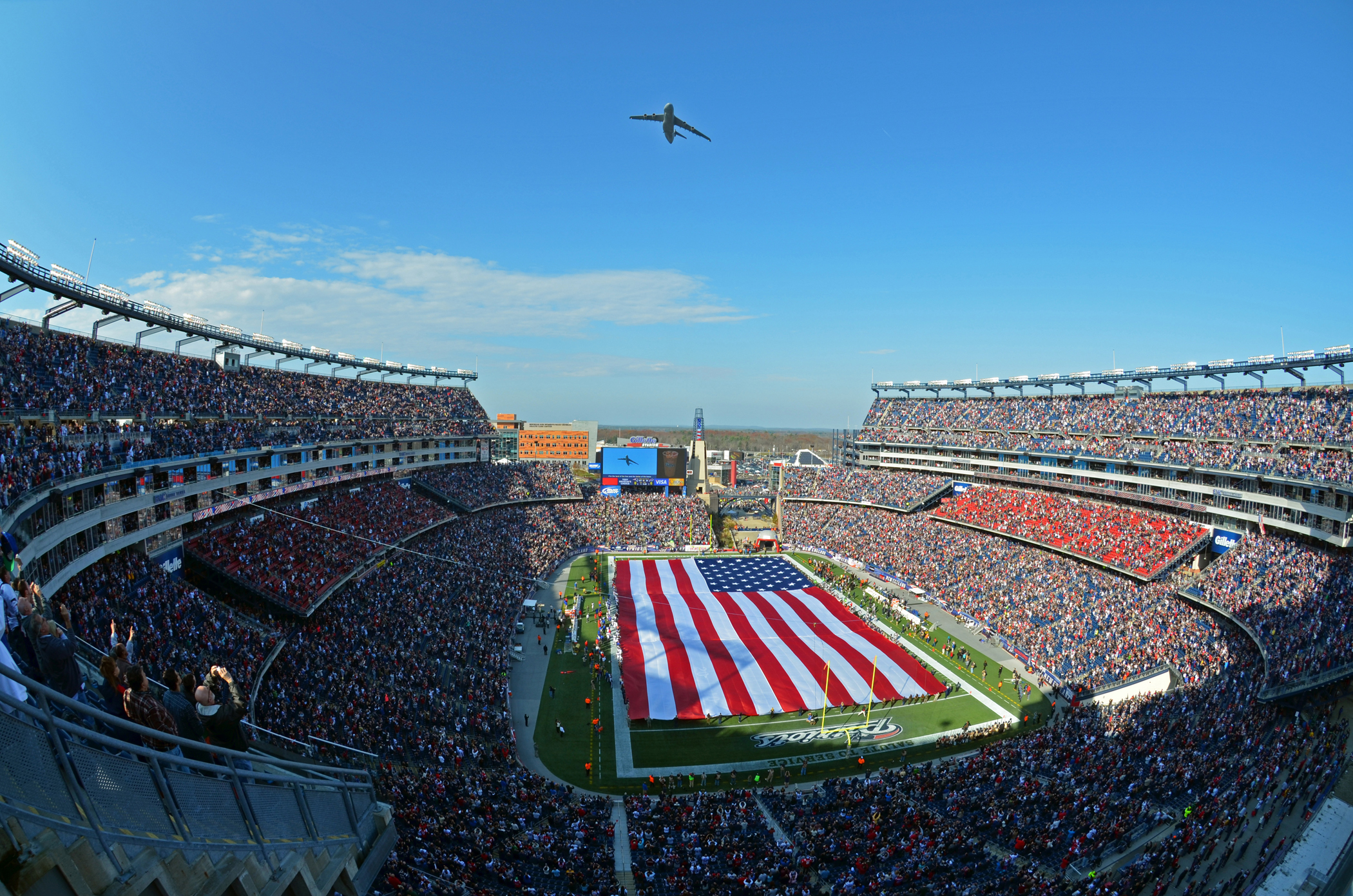
Pregame ceremonies

After the Bills punted on their opening drive, the Patriots drove 48 yards to the Bills 25 and Gostkowski was good on a 43-yard field goal. On the second play of the Bills next drive, Fitzpatrick was strip-sacked by Wilfork with Cunningham recovering at the Patriots 13. Three plays later, Ridley scored on a 1-yard touchdown run, increasing the lead to 10–0. The Bills responded by driving to the Patriots 23 and Lindell was good on a 41-yard field goal, trimming the deficit to 10–3. This led to four straight touchdown drives before halftime. The Patriots responded by racing 83 yards in 8 plays with Woodhead scoring on a 15-yard touchdown run, increasing the lead to 17–3. The Bills answered right back, racing 80 yards in just 6 plays, scoring on a 14-yard run by Jackson, trimming the deficit to 17–10. The Patriots drove 82 yards in 6 plays, scoring on Brady's 12-yard touchdown pass to Gronkowski, upping the lead to 24–10. The Bills weren't done though, marching 75 yards in 11 plays, scoring on Fitzpatrick's two-yard touchdown pass to Chandler, bringing the deficit to 24–17 at halftime. The Patriots drove to the Bills 31, but on 3rd-and-5, Marcell Dareus and Kyle Williams sacked Brady for a 7-yard loss and the Patriots punted rather than attempt a 56-yard field goal. After a Bills punt, aided by an unnecessary roughness penalty bringing the ball to the Bills 39, the Patriots needed just four plays to go 39 yards, scoring on Brady's 18-yard screen pass to Woodhead, his first multi-touchdown game of his career, making the score 31–17. The Bills answered, though, marching 84 yards in 11 plays, with Jackson trimming the deficit to 31–24 on a 1-yard run. The Bills drove to the Patriots 13, but Jackson was stripped by McCourty at the 1 and Arrington recovered. The Patriots were forced to punt, and the Bills raced 55 yards in a minute-and-a-half, scoring on Fitzpatrick's 2-yard touchdown pass to Jones, trimming the deficit to just 34–31. Edelman returned the ensuing kickoff 32 yards to the Patriots 32, and the Patriots drove to the Bills 9, but the Bills defense kept the Patriots out of the end zone, giving the Bills a chance down just 37–31. The Bills drove to the Patriots 15, but, McCourty intercepted Fitzpatrick's next pass in the end zone with 0:23 seconds left, and the Patriots were able to run out the clock.

With the win, the Patriots improved to 6–3 on the season and 11–0 against the Buffalo Bills at Gillette Stadium.

=== Week 11: vs. Indianapolis Colts ===
Rivalry

Quarter	1	2	3	4	Total
Colts	14	3	0	7	24
Patriots	7	17	14	21	59

at Gillette Stadium, Foxborough, Massachusetts

- Game time: 4:25 p.m. EST
- Game weather: 42 °F (6 °C), clear and cool
- Game attendance: 68,756
- Referee: John Parry
- TV announcers (CBS): Jim Nantz (play-by-play) and Phil Simms (color commentator)

The 6–3 Patriots played the 6–3 Indianapolis Colts and their rookie quarterback Andrew Luck. Though both offenses were potent, the Patriots ran roughshod over the Colts.

The Colts took the opening drive 80 yards in 7 plays, added by a 40-yard defensive pass interference penalty on Kyle Arrington to score on a 1-yard touchdown run by Delone Carter. The Patriots countered, racing 81 yards in 8 plays, scoring on Brady's 4-yard touchdown pass to Gronkowski (his 42nd consecutive game with a touchdown pass). The Colts retook the lead on their next drive, covering 84 yards in 10 plays, scoring on a 14-yard touchdown pass from Luck to T. Y. Hilton. McCourty returned the ensuing kickoff 23 yards to the Patriots 25. From there the Patriots drove all the way to the Colts 18, but Gostkowski shanked a 36-yard field goal. After forcing a Colts three-and-out, Julian Edelman ran back the punt for a 68-yard touchdown, tying the game 14-14. On the Colts ensuing drive, Aqib Talib in his first game with New England following a trade from Tampa Bay, intercepted Luck on the first play and ran it back for a 59-yard touchdown, giving the Patriots a 21–14 lead. The Colts drove down the field again on their next possession, reaching the Patriots 29 and Adam Vinatieri was good from 47 yards, making the score 21–17. After returning the kickoff 29 yards to the 25, the Patriots drove all the way to the Colts 13, but could only add a 31-yard field goal for a 24–17 lead. The Colts drove to the Patriots 40 and attempted a 58-yard field goal right before halftime, but it was no good and the score remained 24–17. The Patriots received the opening kick-off of the second half and stormed 76 yards in 10 plays, scoring on a 2-yard touchdown pass from Brady to Edelman, increasing the lead to 31–17. The Colts almost caught a break when on the drive when Darius Butler forced Wes Welker to fumble, but the ball rolled out of bounds, and the Patriots retained possession. The Colts drove to the Patriots 39 on their next drive, but punted rather than risk a 57-yard field goal attempt. On the second play of their next drive, Luck was stripped-sacked by Rob Ninkovich at the Colts 24-yard line. On the very first play of the Patriots ensuing drive, Brady connected with Gronkowski for a touchdown, increasing the lead to 38–17. The Colts just couldn't catch a break. Despite driving all the way to the Patriots 23, Luck was intercepted by Alfonzo Dennard, who returned it 87 yards for a touchdown on the first play of the fourth quarter, increasing the lead to 45–17. The Colts finally responded on their next drive, racing 74 yards in a mere 5 plays, with Luck throwing a 43-yard touchdown to T. Y. Hilton to cut the score to 45–24. However, the Patriots couldn't be stopped. The Patriots raced 80 more yards against an overwhelmed Colts defensive, scoring on Ridley's 1-yard touchdown run, upping the blowout to 52–24. Aided by a 49-yard punt return by Edelman, the Patriots moved 39 yards and scored on a Vereen 4-yard touchdown run, running up the score to 59–24. Gronkowski suffered a freak arm injury on kick-protection on the PAT. The Colts stormed to the Patriots 45 on their next drive, but Luck was intercepted Wilson at the Patriots 22, who it returned it 20 yards to the Patriots 42. After a Patriots punt, the Colts ran out the rest of clock.

Luck completed only 27/50 for 334 yards and 2 touchdowns but 4 interceptions. Hilton was his leading receiver with 6 catches for 100 yards. Vic Ballard rushed 16 times for 72 yards. Tom Brady was excellent going 24/35 for 331 yards 3 touchdowns and 0 interceptions. Gronkowski was his leading receiver with 7 catches for 137 yards and 2 touchdowns. Edelman, Vereen, and Ridley combined for 115 rushing yards and 2 touchdowns.

The win put the Patriots at 7–3 and dropped the Colts to 6–4.

=== Week 12: at New York Jets ===
Thanksgiving Day Rivalry

Quarter	1	2	3	4	Total
Patriots	0	35	0	14	49
Jets	0	3	9	7	19

at MetLife Stadium, East Rutherford, New Jersey

- Game time: 8:20 p.m. EST
- Game weather: 46 °F (8 °C), clear
- Game attendance: 79,088
- Referee: Mike Carey
- TV announcers (NBC): Al Michaels (play-by-play), Cris Collinsworth (color commentator) and Michele Tafoya (sideline reporter)

The Patriots faced the Jets at the Meadowlands in a rematch of their 29–26 overtime win a few weeks earlier, but this game was not similar.

After both teams punted on their opening drive, Edelman gave the Patriots decent field position with a 30-yard return to the Patriots 36. The Patriots drove to the Jets 21, but Gostkowski missed the 39-yard field goal. Starting at their own 30, the Jets drove to the Patriots 23, but Sanchez was intercepted by Gregory at the Patriots 15. The Patriots proceeded to march 84 yards in 15 plays, scoring on the first play of the second quarter. After driving to the Patriots 31, Shonn Greene fumbled Gregory recovering at the Patriots 19. Brady dumped off a short pass to Vereen out of the backfield, who ran untouched down the sideline 83 yards for a touchdown, increasing the Patriots lead to 14–0. On the second play of the Jets next drive, Sanchez ran up the middle, but ran into his offensive line and fumbled (creating the infamous butt fumble) with Gregory returning it 32 yards for a touchdown, giving the Patriots a 21–0 lead. Joe McKnight fumbled the ensuing kickoff right into the hands of Edelman, who returned it 22 yards for a touchdown, giving the Patriots a 28–0 lead. The Jets drove 41 yards to their own 43, but Mayo sacked Sanchez for a 9-yard loss and the Jets punted. The Patriots raced 73 yards in just 4 plays, scoring on a 56-yard touchdown bomb to Edelman, giving the Patriots a 35–0 lead. The Jets drove to the Patriots 14 and Folk got the Jets on the board with a 32-yard field goal. For the second week in a row, the Patriots tied a franchise record set in their 2009 Week 6 game against the Tennessee Titans—in this case, 35 second-quarter points, including three touchdown in 52 seconds. Unlike the Titans game, though, where the Patriots held the ball for 9 minutes and 22 seconds, in this quarter the Patriots held the ball for just 2 minutes and 14 seconds, with the offense running just six plays in the entire quarter. After a Jets punt, the Patriots drove to the Jets 46, but Edelman fumbled with LaRon Landry recovering at the Jets 43. The Jets drove to the Patriots 1-yard line, but Greene was stuffed for no gain on 4th-and-1. A penalty for a chop-block on Ridley in the end zone led to a safety, making the score 35–5 and giving the Jets the ball. The Jets marched 71 yards in 4 plays, scoring on a 4-yard touchdown run by Bilal Powell, making the score 35–12. The Patriots countered with a 17 play, 86-yard marathon, taking seven-and-a-half minutes off the clock and scoring on Brady's 1-yard touchdown run a few minutes into the fourth quarter. On the Jets next drive, Sanchez hit Chaz Schilens for a 22-yard gain to the Jets 45, but Dennard forced him to fumble at the 40 with Ninkovich returning it to the Jets 37. A 28-yard completion to Welker and a 9-yard run by Ridley gave the Patriots a 49–12 lead. Two possessions later, Sanchez hit Keller for a 1-yard touchdown. After a Patriots punt, the Jets ran out of the rest of the clock and the Patriots won the game.

The Patriots scored three touchdowns in a span of 52 seconds, becoming the third team since the AFL-NFL merger to do so. (The 2002 Seahawks did it in 52 seconds while the 1998 Falcons in 49 seconds.) Also, the Patriots scored the most points in consecutive weeks (108) and in a four-week period (190) since the 1950 Los Angeles Rams.

=== Week 13: at Miami Dolphins ===
Quarter	1	2	3	4	Total
Patriots	7	10	0	6	23
Dolphins	3	7	0	6	16

at Sun Life Stadium, Miami Gardens, Florida

- Game time: 1:00 p.m. EST
- Game weather: 77 °F (25 °C), cloudy
- Game attendance: 72,114
- Referee: Ron Winter
- TV announcers (CBS): Greg Gumbel (play-by-play) and Dan Dierdorf (color commentator)

The Patriots faced the Dolphins for the first time of the season in Miami, looking to advance their winning streak to 6 games and remain undefeated against divisional opponents.

Disaster struck on the first drive for the Dolphins. After being forced to punt, Brandon Fields fumbled the punt at the Patriots 8, he managed to make it to the 12, but no further, setting the Patriots up wonderfully. After a 10-yard penalty against, the Patriots scored four plays later with Ridley running in a 4-yard touchdown. After a Dolphins three-and-out, the Patriots drove to the Dolphins 31, but Gostkowski missed a 49-yard field goal wide right. Tom Brady was intercepted on the third play of the Patriots next drive by Reshad Jones. Six plays later, Dan Carpenter got the Dolphins on the board with a 44-yard field goal. Aided by a 29-yard return on the ensuing kickoff, the Patriots put together a 13 play, 75-yard drive in just under six minutes, scoring on a 7-yard touchdown pass to Welker, increasing the lead to 14–3. On the third play of the Dolphins next drive, after narrowly avoiding losing a fumble on the previous play, Ryan Tannehill was strip-sacked by Trevor Scott with Wilfork recovering at the Dolphins 25. The Patriots didn't gain a single yard, but Gostkowski was good on a 43-yard field goal, increasing the lead to 17–3. The Dolphins countered, marching 80 yards in 12 plays, scoring on a 2-yard touchdown run by Tannehill, making the score 17-10 Patriots at halftime. After most of the third quarter were punts, the Patriots took over late in the third, driving to the Dolphins 7, but a 7-yard sack by Koa Misi forced the Patriots to settle for a 32-yard field goal by Gostkowski, increasing the lead to 20-10 early in the fourth quarter. The Dolphins responded, driving all the way to the Patriots 7, but on 3rd-and-4, Mayo sacked Tannehill for an 8-yard loss, forcing them to settle for a 33-yard Carpenter field goal, trimming the deficit to 20–13. The Patriots answered the Dolphins field goal with one of their own, driving all the way to the Dolphins 2, with Gostkowski pushing the score back to two scores 23–13. The Dolphins drove to the Patriots 24 on their next drive, with Carpenter giving the Dolphins a chance with a 42-yard field goal, making the score 23–16. The Patriots dashed the Dolphins hopes with Lloyd recovering the onside kick and Brady taking a knee to seal the win.

With the win, the Patriots improved to 9–3, and clinched their 15th AFC East title.

=== Week 14: vs. Houston Texans ===
Quarter	1	2	3	4	Total
Texans	0	0	7	7	14
Patriots	14	7	7	14	42

at Gillette Stadium, Foxborough, Massachusetts

- Game time: 8:30 p.m. EST
- Game weather: 59 °F (15 °C), rainy and warm
- Game attendance: 68,756
- Referee: Terry McAulay
- TV announcers (ESPN^{[a]}): Mike Tirico (play-by-play), Jon Gruden (color commentator) and Lisa Salters (sideline reporter)

At home against the top team in the AFC, the Patriots dismantled the 11–1 Houston Texans on Monday Night Football. Tom Brady threw four touchdowns in New England's first home game against the Houston Texans since 2006.

After punting on their opening drive, Welker returned the punt 31 yards to the Patriots 44-yard line. The Patriots raced 56 yards in just 7 plays with Hernandez catching a 8-yard touchdown pass. On 1st-and-goal from the 4, running back Stevan Ridley fumbled, but tight end Aaron Hernandez recovered at the 7. On the next play, Hernandez caught Brady's 10-yard touchdown pass for the early lead. The Texans drove all the way to the Texans 21, but on 2nd-and-8, Matt Schaub was intercepted at the 1 by Devin McCourty who returned it to the Patriots 19. The Patriots proceeded by swooping 81 yards in a ridiculous 6 plays to take a 14–0 lead on a 37-yard touchdown reception by Brandon Lloyd. After another Texans punt, the Patriots drove 70 yards, with Brady finding Hernandez, again, uncovered, for a 13-yard touchdown giving the Patriots a 21–0 lead early in the second quarter. After both teams traded punts, the Texans began a 10-play, 56-yard march to the Patriots 33, but on 4th-and-5, Schaub threw an incomplete pass intended for Kevin Walter, turning the ball over on downs. After a Patriots three-and-out, the Texans drove to the Patriots 38, but once again, on 4th-and-5 Schaub threw an incomplete pass, once again intended for Walter for another turnover on downs. Neither team scored for the remainder of the half. After both teams punted to start the second half, the Patriots scored on a 74-yard drive, with a 63-yard touchdown pass to Donté Stallworth, increasing the Patriots lead to 28–0. Stallworth played his first game with the Patriots since August training camp (and first official game since 2007). Following the game, Stallworth was diagnosed with an ankle injury and placed on IR. The Texans finally managed to answer on their next drive by storming 88 yards in just 7 plays, aided by three Patriots penalties, scoring on a 1-yard touchdown run by Arian Foster. The Patriots continued their scoring barrage two drives later. The Patriots marched 72-yards in 9 plays, with Brady throwing a screen pass to Woodhead, J. J. Watt forcing him to fumble, but Brandon Lloyd jumping on it in the end zone for a Patriots touchdown, increasing the lead to 35–7. After the Texans punted, the Patriots marched 68 yards in 10 plays, with Ridley rushing for a 14-yard touchdown, blowing the game open 42–7. Later Brady was pulled, up 42–7, for Ryan Mallett who promptly threw an interception at his own 25. T. J. Yates, replacing Schaub, engineered a 25-yard drive ending with his 1-yard touchdown run. Mallet took three knees on the next drive and the Patriots won the game.

Tom Brady was on point, completing 21/35 passes for 296 yards, 4 touchdowns and 0 interceptions. He was backed up by Ridley and Vereen combining for 112 yards on 26 carries. The Texans offense and defense were overwhelmed, being out-gained 419–323. The win pushed the Patriots to 10–3 while the Texans fell to 11–2, the start of the Texans losing three of their last four, missing out on either a #1 or #2 seed in the playoffs.

=== Week 15: vs. San Francisco 49ers ===
Quarter	1	2	3	4	Total
49ers	7	10	14	10	41
Patriots	0	3	7	24	34

at Gillette Stadium, Foxborough, Massachusetts

- Game time: 8:20 p.m. EST
- Game weather: 34 °F (1 °C), cold and rain
- Game attendance: 68,756
- Referee: Ed Hochuli
- TV announcers (NBC): Al Michaels (play by play), Cris Collinworth (color commentator) & Michele Tafoya (sideline reporter)

In a bitterly fought affair in cold rain, the Patriots fell to 10–4 (1-3 against the NFC West) and snapped their 21-game winning streak at home in December, the longest such winning streak in the NFL at the time. The Patriots fell to 18–4 at Gillette Stadium against NFC teams and have lost three straight home contests in interconference games. The 49ers raced to a 31–3 lead in the third quarter off four Patriots turnovers (two of them Brady interceptions), but the Patriots rallied to score four touchdowns. A 63-yard kick return set up Colin Kaepernick's fourth touchdown pass of the game and a failed fourth-down conversion attempt led to a Niners field goal.

=== Week 16: at Jacksonville Jaguars ===
Quarter	1	2	3	4	Total
Patriots	3	10	3	7	23
Jaguars	10	3	0	3	16

at EverBank Field, Jacksonville, Florida

- Game time: 1:00 p.m. EST
- Game weather: 58 °F (14 °C), no chance of rain
- Game attendance: 70,251
- Referee: Jeff Triplette
- TV announcers (CBS): Kevin Harlan (play-by-play) and Solomon Wilcots (color commentator)

The Patriots ground out a 23–16 win sealed on two late interceptions by Patrick Chung. As a result, New England improved to 11-4, finishing both 4-0 against the AFC South & 6-2 on the road.

The Jaguars surprised the Patriots by storming 78 yards in 9 plays to take an early 7–0 lead on a Chad Henne 3-yard touchdown pass to Justin Blackmon. On the third play of their first drive Brady was intercepted by Chris Prosinski at the Jaguars 43 who returned it 4 yards to the 47. The Jaguars reached the Patriots 23, and Josh Scobee came on a drilled a 41-yard field goal, increasing the lead to 10–0. The Patriots got going on their next drive, marching all the way to the Jags 7, but could only get a field goal out of it. Henne continued to carve update the Patriots secondary, reaching Patriots territory on a 36-yard bomb to Jordan Shipley, but the Patriots defense held and Scobee missed a 43-yard field goal, keeping the score 10–3. However, once again on the third play of the Patriots next drive, Brady was intercepted by Derek Cox. The Jaguars took advantage, driving to the Patriots 17 and Scobee kicked his second field goal, extending the Jaguars surprising lead to 13–3. Two possession later, the Patriots marched to the Jaguars 30 and Gostkowski was good on a 48-yard field goal. The Patriots forced the Jags to punt again on their next drive, and once again the Patriots took advantage, marching 66 yards in 10 plays, scoring on a 14-yard touchdown pass from Brady to Woodhead with :18 seconds remaining in the first half, tying the game at 13-13. Henne completed a pass to Shipley to the Patriots 40, but time expired. After receiving the opening kick-off, the Patriots drove to the Jaguars 20 and took the lead 16–13 on a 38-yard Gostkowski field goal. Two possessions later, at midfield, Henne was intercepted by Marquice Cole at the Patriots 40. Two possessions later, after Welker returned a punt 16 yards to the Patriots 41, the Patriots marched 59 yards in 9 plays, scoring on a two-yard touchdown pass from Brady to Welker, increasing the lead to 23–13. The Jaguars responded on their next drive, reaching the Patriots 24 and trimming the deficit to 23–16 on a 42-yard field goal by Scobee, his third. After a Patriots punt, the Jags stormed to Pats the 1-yard line. On 1st down, Greg Jones was tackled for no gain. On 2nd down, Zach Potter was flagged for a false start moving the ball to the Patriots 5. An incompletion and 5-yard sack followed bring up 4th-and-goal at the 10. On the next play, Chung intercepted Henne in the end zone and returned it 27 yards to the Patriots 28. The Jaguars forced the Patriots to punt and got the ball back at their own 38 with :54 seconds left. An unnecessary roughness penalty on Chung coupled with completions of 17 and 18 yards to Toney Clemons and Jordan Shipley, respectively moved the ball to the Patriots 12 yard line. However, Henne was intercepted by Chung again, who kneeled for a touchback and the Patriots escaped with the win. The win, however, left the Patriots angry; Tom Brady criticized his teammates following the game, saying "We didn't compete," and his postgame press conference was unusually short.

=== Week 17: vs. Miami Dolphins ===
Quarter	1	2	3	4	Total
Dolphins	0	0	0	0	0
Patriots	7	14	0	7	28

at Gillette Stadium, Foxborough, Massachusetts

- Game time: 4:25 p.m. EST
- Game weather: 25 °F (−4 °C), Wind Chill 7 °F (−14 °C), Partly Cloudy and Cold
- Game attendance: 68,756
- Referee: Jerome Boger
- TV announcers (CBS): Jim Nantz (play-by-play) and Phil Simms (color commentator)

Tom Brady threw for two touchdowns, Stevan Ridley ran for two more, and the defense shut down Miami in a blowout victory.

With the shutout win, the Patriots ended their regular season at 12–4 (6-2 at home), and they swept their AFC East rivals for the first time since 2007. The win also clinched the AFC's No. 2 seed, following the Texans' loss to the Colts earlier that day.

The game was the final regular-season radiocast for longtime Patriots play-by-play announcer Gil Santos; CBS Sports made note of this by simulcasting part of his game call on their telecast. His longtime color analyst Gino Cappelletti rejoined Santos in the radio booth during the first quarter.

As of 2025, this remains the last time the Patriots had swept the AFC East.

== Postseason schedule ==
Week	Kickoff	Date	Opponent	Result	Record	Game Site	TV	NFL.com Recap
Wild Card	First-round bye							
Divisional	4:30 PM EST	January 13, 2013	Houston Texans	W 41–28	1–0	Gillette Stadium	CBS	Recap
AFC Championship	6:30 PM EST	January 20, 2013	Baltimore Ravens	L 13–28	1–1	Gillette Stadium	CBS	Recap

== Postseason results ==
=== Divisional Round vs. Houston Texans ===
Quarter	1	2	3	4	Total
Texans	3	10	0	15	28
Patriots	7	10	14	10	41

at Gillette Stadium, Foxborough, Massachusetts

- Game time: 4:30 p.m. EST
- Game weather: 51 °F (11 °C), cloudy and mild
- Game attendance: 68,756
- Referee: Tony Corrente
- TV announcers (CBS): Jim Nantz (play-by-play), Phil Simms (color commentator) and Steve Tasker (sideline reporter)

Danieal Manning returned the opening kickoff 94 yards to the Patriots 12. After a 3-yard run by Foster, back-to-back incompletions forced the Texans to settle for a 27-yard field goal by Shayne Graham for an early 3–0 lead. After a Patriots three-and-out, the Texans drove to the Patriots 45, but were forced to punt. Three possessions later, the Patriots finally got on the board, marching 65 yards in 6 plays, scoring on Vereen's 1-yard touchdown run. The Texans drove deep into their own territory on their next drive, but were forced to punt. The Patriots responded by driving all the way to the Texans 19, and took a 10–3 lead on Gostkowski's 37-yard field goal. The Texans then drove to the Patriots 43, but couldn't get any further and punted. The Patriots made them pay, racing 80 yards in 7 plays, scoring on an 8-yard touchdown catch by Vereen, widening the lead to 17–3. A 47-yard catch by Welker on the drive gave him the new franchise record for postseason catches (59) over legend Troy Brown. Manning returned the ensuing kickoff 35 yards to the Texans 38, but a horse-collar tackle moved the ball to the Patriots 47. It took just 5 plays for the Texans to strike on Foster's 1-yard touchdown run, trimming the deficit to 17–10 with just over a minute remaining in the first half. After forcing the Patriots to a quick three-and-out, the Texans raced to the Patriots 37 and Graham nailed a 55-yard field goal, bringing the score to 17–13 at halftime. But the Patriots took over in the second half. After Slater returned the ensuing kickoff 19 yards to the Patriots 31, the Patriots marched 69 yards in 7 plays, scoring an 8-yard touchdown run by Ridley, increasing the lead to 24–13. Two possessions later, the Texans once again drove deep into Patriots territory, to the 37, but Schaub was intercepted by Ninkovich at the 31. It took the Patriots under three minutes to race 63 yards, scoring on Lloyd's 5-yard touchdown catch, widening the lead to 31–13. This was Brady's 40th career touchdown pass in the postseason, making him only the third player with so many in the postseason. The Texans reached their own 23 on their next drive, but on 4th-and-1, Schaub's deep pass fell incomplete. On the very next play Brady hit Vereen on a 33-yard touchdown pass, Vereen's third touchdown of the game, putting the game away with a 38–13 score. This was the 5th 300-yard postseason game for Brady and Vereen tied Curtis Martin and Gronkowski with three touchdowns in a playoff game. Manning continued his great returning with a 69-yard return to the Patriots 37. Five plays later, Schaub hit DeVier Posey on a 25-yard touchdown pass, trimming the deficit to 38–20. After a Patriots punt, the Texans marched 73 yards in 11 plays, scoring on Schaub's 1-yard touchdown pass to Foster on 4th-and-Goal, with a successful two-point conversion, trimming the deficit to 38–28 with 5:11 left, giving the Texans a chance, but Ninkovich recovered the ensuing onside kick, the Patriots drained the clock to 1:14, and Gostkowski kicked a 38-yard field goal, making the score 41–28. The Texans drove to the Patriots 41, but the clock ran out after Schaub hit Daniels for a 9-yard gain.

Tom Brady became the winningest quarterback in NFL playoff history with his 17th postseason win, breaking a tie with Joe Montana; it was also the 450th victory (regular season and playoffs) in franchise history. The win put the Patriots into the AFL-AFC Title Game for the tenth time in franchise history (ninth under the AFC banner) and a rematch of the 2011 title game (as well as a rematch of Week 3) with the Baltimore Ravens.

=== AFC Championship vs. Baltimore Ravens ===
Quarter	1	2	3	4	Total
Ravens	0	7	7	14	28
Patriots	3	10	0	0	13

at Gillette Stadium, Foxborough, Massachusetts

- Game time: 6:30 p.m. EST
- Game weather: 41 °F (5 °C), clear and windy
- Game attendance: 68,756
- Referee: Bill Leavy
- TV announcers (CBS): Jim Nantz (play-by-play), Phil Simms (color commentator) and Steve Tasker (sideline reporter)

Just as they had the previous season, the Patriots faced the Ravens at home for the right to represent the AFC in the Super Bowl. The Patriots led 13–7 in the first half, but were shut out for the second half by the Ravens. With the loss, the Patriots concluded their season with a record of 13–5, and dropped to 1–2 against the Ravens during the postseason (all 3 playoff meetings have occurred at Gillette Stadium). This was also the first time Tom Brady lost a home game after leading at halftime.

== Awards and honors ==
Recipient	Weekly awards	Yearly awards
Brandon Bolden	Week 4: FedEx Ground Player of the Week	
Tom Brady	Week 4: AFC Offensive Player of the Week, FedEx Air Player of the Week; Week 8: AFC Offensive Player of the Week, FedEx Air Player of the Week; Week 12: Thanksgiving Madden Players of the Game; Week 14: AFC Offensive Player of the Week, FedEx Air Player of the Week	
Steve Gregory	Week 12: Thanksgiving Madden Players of the Game	
Rob Gronkowski		PFWA/Pro Football Weekly All-NFL Team
Chandler Jones	September: NFL Defensive Rookie of the Month	PFWA/Pro Football Weekly All-NFL Team
Logan Mankins		Associated Press All-Pro Team (second team)
Devin McCourty	Week 7: NFL Special Teams Player of the Week	
New England Offensive Line	Week 12: Madden Most Valuable Protectors Award	
Matthew Slater		PFWA/Pro Football Weekly All-NFL Team
Vince Wilfork	Week 12: Thanksgiving Madden Players of the Game	PFWA/Pro Football Weekly All-NFL Team; Associated Press All-Pro Team (first team)

== Statistics ==
Updated through Week 17

=== Regular season statistical leaders ===
	Player(s)	Value
Passing yards	Tom Brady	4,827
Passing touchdowns	Tom Brady	34
Rushing yards	Stevan Ridley	1,263
Rushing touchdowns	Stevan Ridley	12
Receptions	Wes Welker	118
Receiving yards	Wes Welker	1,354
Receiving touchdowns	Rob Gronkowski	11
Points	Stephen Gostkowski	153
Kickoff return yards	Devin McCourty	654
Punt return yards	Julian Edelman	263
Tackles	Jerod Mayo	147
Sacks	Rob Ninkovich	8.0
Forced fumbles	Rob Ninkovich, Brandon Spikes	5
Interceptions	Devin McCourty	5

=== Statistical league rankings ===
- Total Offense (YPG): 426.9 (1st)
- Passing (YPG): 292.4 (4th)
- Rushing (YPG): 134.5 (8th)
- Total Defense (YPG): 381.1 (27th)
- Passing (YPG): 275.5 (29th)
- Rushing (YPG): 105.5 (12th)
