= Vince Wilfork =

American football player (born 1981)

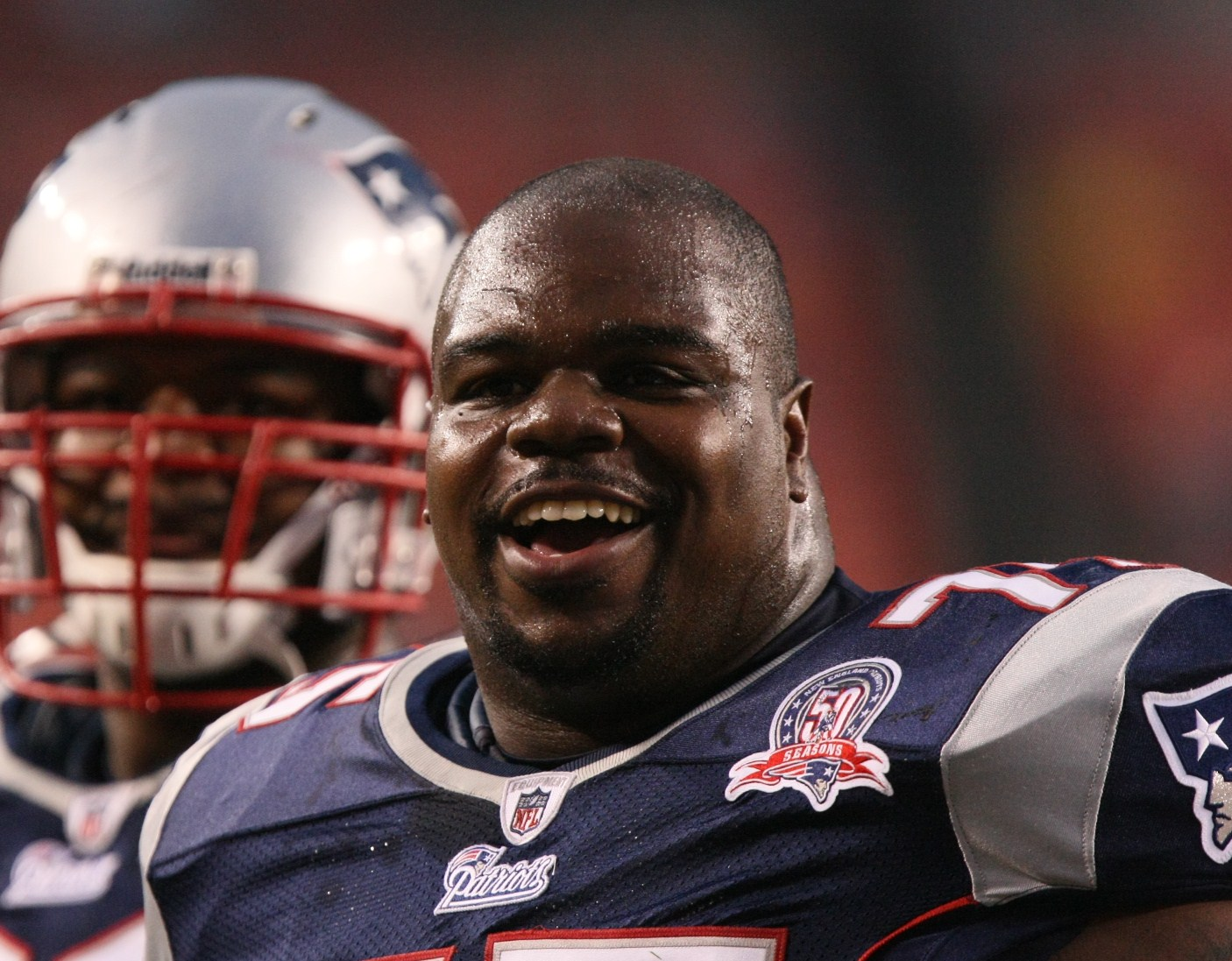
- Wilfork with the New England Patriots in 2009

No. 75
- Position: Defensive tackle

Personal information
- Born: November 4, 1981 (age 45); Boynton Beach, Florida, U.S.
- Listed height: 6 ft 2 in (1.88 m)
- Listed weight: 325 lb (147 kg)

Career information
- High school: Santaluces (Lantana, Florida)
- College: Miami (FL) (2001–2003)
- NFL draft: 2004: 1st round, 21st overall pick

Career history
- New England Patriots (2004–2014); Houston Texans (2015–2016)

Awards and highlights
- 2× Super Bowl champion (XXXIX, XLIX); First-team All-Pro (2012); 4× Second-team All-Pro (2007, 2009–2011); 5× Pro Bowl (2007, 2009–2012); New England Patriots All-2000s Team; New England Patriots 50th Anniversary Team; New England Patriots All-2010s Team; New England Patriots All-Dynasty Team; New England Patriots Hall of Fame; BCS national champion (2001); First-team All-Big East (2003)

Career NFL statistics
- Total tackles: 560
- Sacks: 16
- Forced fumbles: 5
- Fumble recoveries: 12
- Pass deflections: 27
- Interceptions: 3
- Defensive touchdowns: 1
- Stats at Pro Football Reference

Vincent Lamar Wilfork (born November 4, 1981) is an American former professional football defensive tackle who played in the National Football League (NFL) for 13 seasons, primarily with the New England Patriots. He is regarded as one of the greatest defensive tackles of all time.

Wilfork played college football for the Miami Hurricanes, earning first-team All-Big East honors in 2003. He was selected in the first round of the 2004 NFL draft by the Patriots, where he spent his first 11 seasons. During his New England tenure, Wilfork received five Pro Bowl selections and one first-team All-Pro selection. Wilfork also won two Super Bowl titles. In his final two seasons, Wilfork was a member of the Houston Texans.

== Early life ==
Wilfork was born in Boynton Beach, Florida, and attended Santaluces Community High School in nearby Lantana. There, he was a letter winner in football, wrestling, and track and field. In football, he won USA Today's second team All-American honors.

In track & field, Wilfork was one of the nation's top performers in the throwing events. He was the Florida Class 4A state champion in the shot put and the discus in 2000. He also holds the Florida state high school record in the shot put with a throw of 68 feet (20.73 m). In the discus event, his top throw was 180 feet (54.86 m).

== College career ==
Wilfork attended the University of Miami, where he played for the Miami Hurricanes football team. He also competed for the Miami Hurricanes track and field team; he held the Miami indoor school record in the shot put until Isaiah Simmons surpassed it in 2013. In his freshman season, Wilfork did not start but played in every game as a defensive tackle, finishing 10th on the team in tackles with 41 while also recording a sack and forcing three fumbles. Wilfork did not start a game in his 2002 sophomore season either, but still recorded 43 tackles and seven sacks. Before the 2003 season, Wilfork was rated the second best defensive tackle in the country by The Sporting News and went on to start all 13 games for Miami. He finished the year with a career-high 64 tackles and led the team with 20 quarterback hurries. He was named to the All-Big East Conference first-team following the season, which would prove to be his last in Miami as he decided to forgo his senior season and enter the 2004 NFL draft.

Wilfork was inducted into the University of Miami Sports Hall of Fame in 2019.

== Professional career ==
=== New England Patriots ===
Wilfork was ranked by most in the media as the second best defensive tackle prospect in the 2004 NFL draft behind only Tommie Harris. Although regarded as a top-10 talent, Wilfork was criticized for lackadaisical effort during his junior season. Wilfork drew comparisons to fellow Miami alumnus Warren Sapp, and was selected in the first round (21st overall) by the New England Patriots. He was the highest selected Miami Hurricane defensive tackle since Damione Lewis in 2001.

Pre-draft measurables
Height	Weight	Arm length	Hand span	40-yard dash	20-yard shuttle	Three-cone drill	Vertical jump	Broad jump	Bench press
6 ft 1 1/4 in (1.86 m)	323 lb (147 kg)	32 1/2 in (0.83 m)	9 5/8 in (0.24 m)	5.08 s	4.50 s	7.62 s	26.5 in (0.67 m)	8 ft 5 in (2.57 m)	36 reps
Height/weight and bench press from NFL Scouting Combine, all others from Miami Pro Day

==== 2004–2006 ====
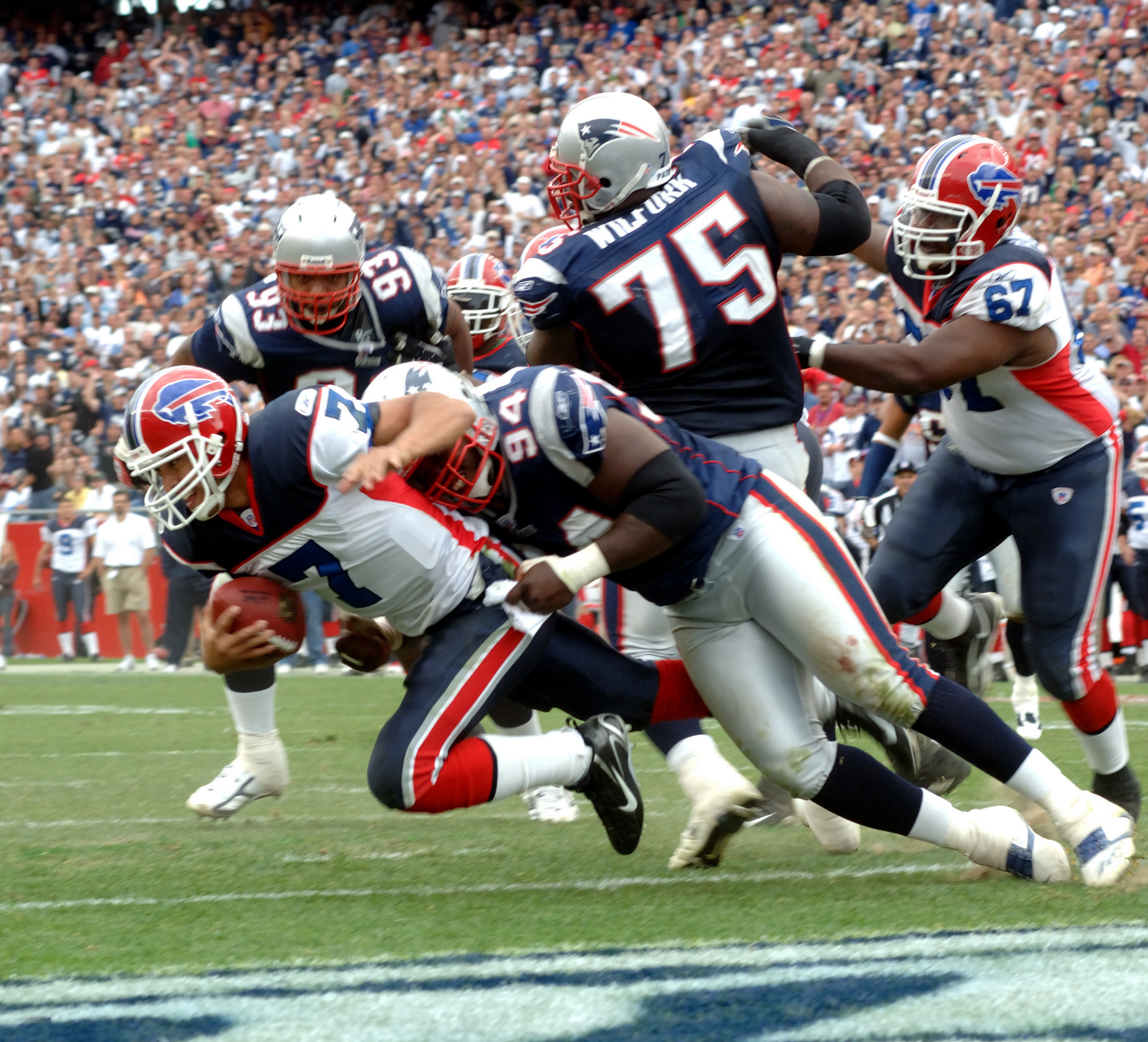
Wilfork (#75) during a game against the Buffalo Bills in September 2006

In his rookie 2004 season with the Patriots, he compiled two sacks, 42 tackles, and three deflected passes. Wilfork saw considerable playing time during his rookie season, sharing the nose tackle position with veteran Keith Traylor and started Super Bowl XXXIX against the Philadelphia Eagles, a Patriots victory.

Following Traylor's release, Wilfork had a career-high 54 tackles in 2005 and started all 16 games; however, the defending champions were eliminated in the second round of playoffs by the Denver Broncos. In 2006, Wilfork finished the season with 50 tackles, appearing in 13 games.

==== 2007–2008 ====
In the 2007 season, Wilfork finished the season with 48 tackles and two sacks, was selected to the 2008 Pro Bowl, and was named as a second-team All-Pro selection.

Wilfork was fined a total of four times by the NFL in the 2007 season. In the third game of the season he was fined $12,500 by the NFL for his hit on Buffalo Bills quarterback J. P. Losman. This was appealed to the NFL and reduced to $2,500. In an October 14 game against the Dallas Cowboys, Wilfork was fined $5,000 for drawing an unsportsmanlike conduct foul when he tangled with Cowboys tight end Jason Witten. In the last game of the regular 2007 season, Wilfork placed his finger in the facemask of New York Giants running back Brandon Jacobs after a play in the second quarter. He was fined $15,000. He was also fined $5,000 for a 15-yard face-mask penalty called in the AFC Championship Game against the San Diego Chargers, while attempting to tackle running back Michael Turner.

Wilfork's string of fines continued into the 2008 season, when in an October 20 game against the Denver Broncos Wilfork appeared to elbow Broncos quarterback Jay Cutler in the head after a play. Wilfork met with NFL commissioner Roger Goodell in the days following the game and reportedly faced a one-game suspension, but after Wilfork explained his manner of playing to Goodell only a fine was imposed. Wilfork finished the 2008 season with a career-high 66 tackles, while recording two sacks. In 2008, he was also named for the first time a defensive captain, by his teammates.

==== 2009–2014 ====
Wilfork entered the final season of his contract in 2009. Reportedly unhappy with not receiving a contract extension, Wilfork did not attend the team's voluntary organized team activities in the spring, but reported to the team's mandatory sessions later in the summer. In August 2009, he was named to the Patriots' 50th anniversary team. Wilfork would go on to start the first 13 games of the season for the Patriots, missing the final three games of the season with an ankle injury before returning for the Patriots' playoff loss to the Baltimore Ravens. He finished the season with 43 tackles and no sacks, and he was elected to the 2010 Pro Bowl.

Wilfork's contract expired after the 2009 season. He stated that he was looking for a long-term deal and threatened with a holdout should the Patriots instead place a franchise tag on him. In an interview with the South Florida Sun-Sentinel he also acknowledged it would be "a dream come true" to play for either the Tampa Bay Buccaneers or the Miami Dolphins. On February 22, Wilfork was assigned the non-exclusive version of the franchise tag by the Patriots, who expressed their desire to reach a long-term contract with Wilfork. On March 5, the first day of free agency, the Patriots re-signed Wilfork to a five-year, $40 million contract with $25 million in guaranteed money.

After starting the first three games of the 2010 season at nose tackle, Wilfork moved to defensive end beginning in Week 4 against the Miami Dolphins. He returned to start at nose tackle in the Patriots' Week 8 win over the Minnesota Vikings. He would continue to switch between the positions for the remainder of the season, but started all 16 games and finished with 57 tackles and two sacks. Wilfork was selected to the 2011 Pro Bowl after the season. Wilfork was named to the 2010 AP All-Pro Second Team at defensive tackle, finishing third in the voting, but also received a vote at defensive end. He was ranked 35th by his fellow players on the NFL Top 100 Players of 2011.

At the start of the 2011 NFL Season, he played defensive tackle when the New England Patriots moved to a 4–3 defense thanks to his former teammate Albert Haynesworth and after playing nose tackle for the first seven NFL seasons. In the second game of the 2011 season, Wilfork got his first career interception off San Diego Chargers quarterback, Philip Rivers. He caught his second interception against the Oakland Raiders two weeks later. He scored a touchdown on week 14 against the Washington Redskins at the FedExField.

During the 2011 season, Wilfork recorded 3.5 sacks—a new career high—and was included on the AFC's 2012 Pro Bowl roster. In the AFC Championship game against the Ravens, he had one of his best games of his career, recording 1.5 sacks and 6 tackles. At the end of the 2011 season, Wilfork and the Patriots appeared in Super Bowl XLVI. He started in the game and recorded three total tackles, but the Patriots lost to the New York Giants by a score of 21–17.

Wilfork was selected as a defensive tackle for USA Football's 2012 "All Fundamentals Team", which honors 26 NFL players each year for executing the fundamentals of their position. He was also named to his fourth career Pro Bowl team and to the All Pro second team.

In 2012, he was voted co-captain for the fifth straight season by his teammates. Wilfork made one of the most famous plays of his career on November 22, 2012, in a game against the New York Jets. In the second quarter, he shoved Jets offensive lineman Brandon Moore in the direction of quarterback Mark Sanchez, causing an unlucky collision between Sanchez and Moore's buttocks and resulting in a fumble that was returned for a touchdown by safety Steve Gregory. The play became known as the Butt Fumble. Wilfork finished the year with 48 total tackles and 3 sacks. His strong season earned him a spot in the Associated Press All Pro first team and in the 2013 Pro Bowl.

In week 4 of the 2013 NFL season against the Atlanta Falcons, Wilfork tore his right Achilles' tendon while trying to get past Falcons offensive guard Justin Blalock. Wilfork would miss the rest of the 2013 season after being placed on injured reserve.

In March 2014, Wilfork re-signed to a three-year, $22.5 million deal.

In the 2014 NFL season, Wilfork recorded 47 tackles, 2 passes defensed, and 1 interception. He helped the Patriots reach Super Bowl XLIX. In the Super Bowl, Wilfork recorded 2 tackles as they defeated the Seattle Seahawks, 28–24, to give Wilfork his second Super Bowl championship.

On March 5, 2015, the Patriots declined their team option on Wilfork's contract, which made him a free agent at the end of the 2014 league season.

=== Houston Texans ===
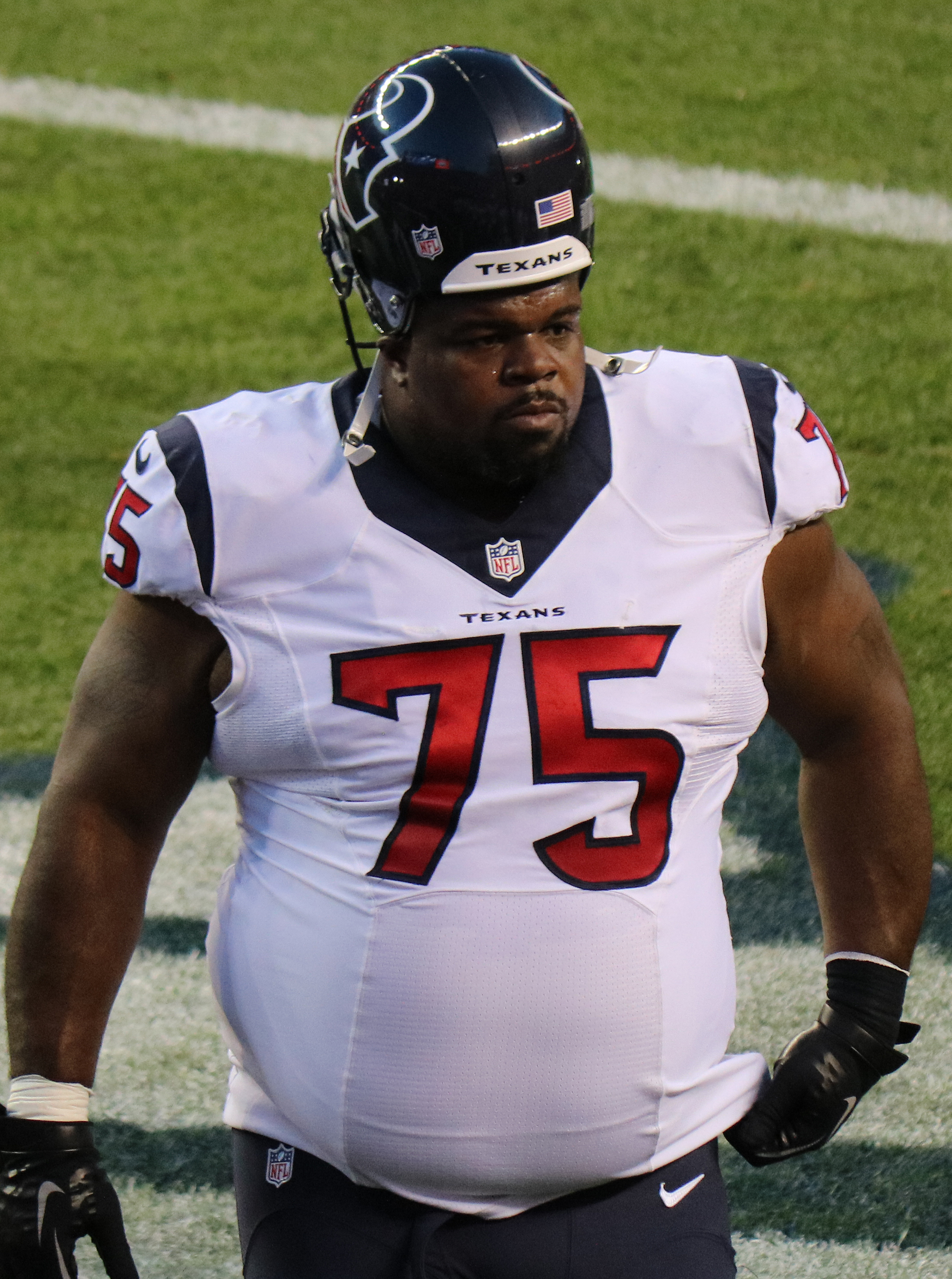
Wilfork with the Houston Texans in October 2016

On March 16, 2015, Wilfork signed a two-year deal with the Houston Texans. He started all 16 games in 2015 at the nose tackle position making 22 tackles. In his two seasons in Houston, he totaled 43 tackles, helping the Texans win back-to-back AFC South titles.

=== Retirement ===
On August 9, 2017, Wilfork held a press conference to announce his retirement, along with signing a one-day contract to retire with the Patriots.

During the 2018 season, the Patriots honored Wilfork by naming him honorary captain for the AFC Championship game and he presented the Lamar Hunt Trophy after the Patriots beat the Kansas City Chiefs. After the Super Bowl LIII win, Wilfork carried the Lombardi Trophy along with Emmitt Smith and Joe Namath to the presentation stage.

In 2022, Wilfork was voted into the Patriots Hall of Fame, becoming the sixth player in their first year of eligibility to be selected by the fans. He was inducted on Saturday, September 24, 2022.

== NFL career statistics ==
Legend
	Won the Super Bowl
**Bold**	Career high

=== Regular season ===
Year	Team	Games		Tackles				Fumbles				Interceptions					
Year	Team	GP	GS	Cmb	Solo	Ast	Sck	FF	FR	Yds	TD	Int	Yds	Avg	Lng	TD	PD
2004	NE	**16**	6	42	27	15	2.0	0	2	0	0	0	0	0.0	0	0	3
2005	NE	**16**	**16**	54	40	14	0.5	0	1	0	0	0	0	0.0	0	0	1
2006	NE	13	13	50	40	10	1.0	0	1	0	0	0	0	0.0	0	0	1
2007	NE	**16**	**16**	48	36	12	2.0	0	1	0	0	0	0	0.0	0	0	2
2008	NE	**16**	**16**	**66**	45	21	2.0	0	0	0	0	0	0	0.0	0	0	1
2009	NE	13	13	43	31	12	0.0	1	0	0	0	0	0	0.0	0	0	2
2010	NE	**16**	**16**	57	**46**	11	2.0	0	1	0	0	0	0	0.0	0	0	2
2011	NE	**16**	**16**	52	29	**23**	**3.5**	1	2	0	**1**	**2**	**47**	**23.5**	**28**	0	5
2012	NE	**16**	**16**	48	29	19	3.0	**2**	**4**	**2**	0	0	0	0.0	0	0	**6**
2013	NE	4	4	9	4	5	0.0	0	0	0	0	0	0	0.0	0	0	0
2014	NE	**16**	**16**	47	24	**23**	0.0	0	0	0	0	1	1	1.0	1	0	2
2015	HOU	**16**	**16**	22	6	16	0.0	0	0	0	0	0	0	0.0	0	0	0
2016	HOU	15	15	21	9	12	0.0	0	0	0	0	0	0	0.0	0	0	1
Career		189	179	559	366	193	16.0	4	12	2	1	3	48	16.0	28	0	26

=== Postseason ===
Year	Team	Games		Tackles				Fumbles				Interceptions					
Year	Team	GP	GS	Cmb	Solo	Ast	Sck	FF	FR	Yds	TD	Int	Yds	Avg	Lng	TD	PD
2004	NE	**3**	1	3	2	1	0.0	0	0	0	0	0	0	0.0	0	0	0
2005	NE	2	2	7	2	5	0.5	0	0	0	0	0	0	0.0	0	0	0
2006	NE	**3**	**3**	13	**11**	2	0.0	0	**1**	**31**	0	0	0	0.0	0	0	0
2007	NE	**3**	**3**	**16**	10	**6**	0.0	0	0	0	0	0	0	0.0	0	0	**1**
2009	NE	1	1	13	9	4	0.0	0	0	0	0	0	0	0.0	0	0	0
2010	NE	1	1	5	5	0	0.0	0	0	0	0	0	0	0.0	0	0	0
2011	NE	**3**	**3**	12	7	5	**2.5**	0	0	0	0	0	0	0.0	0	0	0
2012	NE	2	2	6	2	4	0.0	0	0	0	0	0	0	0.0	0	0	0
2013	NE	0	0	Did not play due to injury													
2014	NE	**3**	**3**	6	4	2	0.0	0	0	0	0	0	0	0.0	0	0	0
2015	HOU	1	1	3	2	1	0.0	0	0	0	0	0	0	0.0	0	0	0
2016	HOU	2	2	1	0	1	0.0	0	0	0	0	0	0	0.0	0	0	0
Total		24	22	85	54	31	3.0	0	1	31	0	0	0	0.0	0	0	1

== Personal life ==
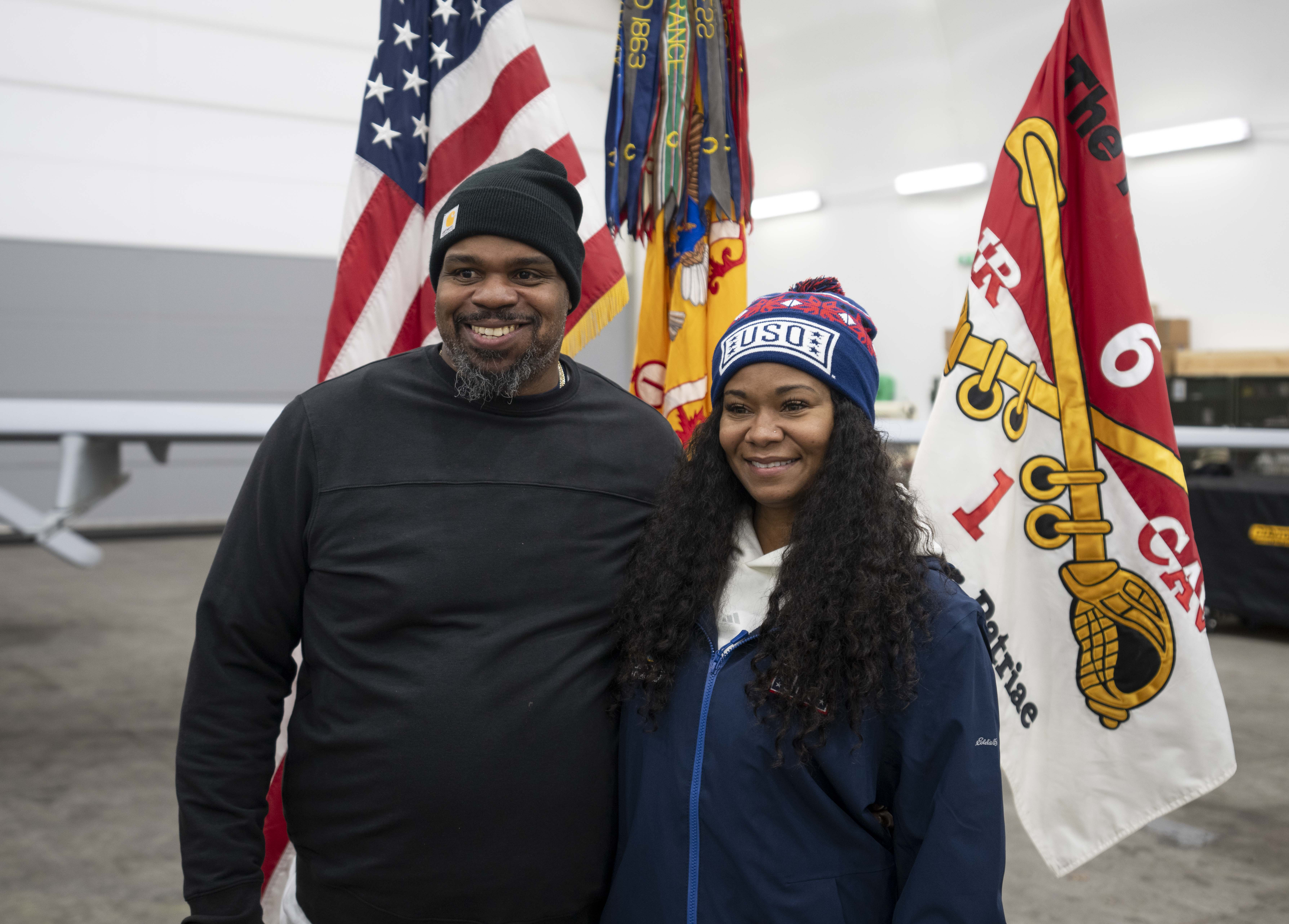
Wilfork, left, and his wife with the United Service Organizations in 2023

Wilfork lives in Houston, Texas and Florida. He has one son and one daughter. He married Bianca Farinas in 2004. They later divorced. Wilfork remarried on October 8, 2020. Both of Wilfork's parents died in 2002 and never saw him play in the NFL.

Following the Patriots' victory in the 2014 AFC Championship game, Wilfork helped remove a driver out from an overturned vehicle. He noticed the flipped SUV on his way home from Gillette Stadium, assisting an officer already at the scene. Wilfork later recounted the event and his role in helping the driver: "I think anybody would do the same thing, I saw the lady in there and asked her if she was OK, could she move. She grabbed my hand, and kind of talked her through [it]. It wasn't a big deal; it was seeing someone that needed help and helping. I was just trying to get her to safety."
