= 2012 All-Pro Team =

Official list of the best NFL players in 2012

The 2012 All-Pro teams were named by the Associated Press (AP), Pro Football Writers of America (PFWA), and The Sporting News (TSN) for performance in the 2012 NFL season. (Note: The 2013 Pro Bowl represents the 2012 NFL season) While none of these have the official imprimatur of the NFL (whose official recognition is nomination to the 2013 Pro Bowl), they are included (separately) in the NFL Record and Fact Book. Any player selected to any of the teams can be described as an "All-Pro."

The AP team, with first- and second-team selections, was chosen by a national panel of 50 NFL writers; the Sporting News selection process used a panel of 27 NFL coaches and executives, while the PFWA team is chosen by polling its 300+ members.

== Teams ==
Offense
Position	First team	Second team
Quarterback	Peyton Manning, Denver Broncos (AP, PFWA) Tom Brady, New England Patriots (SN)	Aaron Rodgers, Green Bay Packers (AP-2)
Running back	Adrian Peterson, Minnesota Vikings (AP, PFWA, SN); Marshawn Lynch, Seattle Seahawks (AP, PFWA); Arian Foster, Houston Texans (SN)	Alfred Morris, Washington Redskins (AP-2); Jamaal Charles, Kansas City (AP-2);
Fullback	Vonta Leach, Baltimore Ravens (AP)	Jerome Felton, Minnesota Vikings (AP-2)
Wide receiver	Brandon Marshall, Chicago Bears (AP, PFWA, SN); Calvin Johnson, Detroit Lions (AP, PFWA, SN)	Andre Johnson, Houston Texans (AP-2); A. J. Green, Cincinnati Bengals (AP-2)
Tight end	Tony Gonzalez, Atlanta Falcons (AP); Rob Gronkowski, New England Patriots (PFWA); Jason Witten, Dallas Cowboys (SN)	Jason Witten, Dallas Cowboys (AP-2)
Tackle	Ryan Clady, Denver Broncos (AP, PFWA, SN); Duane Brown, Houston Texans (AP, PFWA); Joe Thomas, Cleveland Browns (SN)	Joe Staley, San Francisco 49ers (AP-2); Joe Thomas, Cleveland Browns (AP-2)
Guard	Mike Iupati, San Francisco 49ers (AP, PFWA, SN); Jahri Evans, New Orleans Saints (AP, SN); Marshal Yanda, Baltimore Ravens (PFWA)	Marshal Yanda, Baltimore Ravens (AP-2); Logan Mankins, New England Patriots (AP-2)
Center	Max Unger, Seattle Seahawks (AP); John Sullivan, Minnesota Vikings (PFWA); Maurkice Pouncey, Pittsburgh Steelers (SN)	Maurkice Pouncey, Pittsburgh Steelers (AP-2)

Special teams
Position	First team	Second team
Kicker	Blair Walsh, Minnesota (AP, PFWA); Phil Dawson, Cleveland (SN)	Phil Dawson, Cleveland (AP-2)
Punter	Andy Lee, San Francisco 49ers (AP, PFWA); Thomas Morstead, New Orleans (SN)	Thomas Morstead, New Orleans (AP-2)
Kick returner	Jacoby Jones, Baltimore Ravens (AP, PFWA, SN)	David Wilson, New York Giants (AP-2)
Punt returner	Leodis McKelvin, Buffalo (PFWA, SN)	
Special teams	Matthew Slater, New England Patriots (PFWA)	

Defense
Position	First team	Second team
Defensive end	Cameron Wake, Miami Dolphins (AP, PFWA, SN); J. J. Watt, Houston Texans (AP, PFWA, SN)	Justin Smith, San Francisco 49ers (AP-2); Julius Peppers, Chicago Bears (AP-2)
Defensive tackle	Vince Wilfork, New England Patriots (AP, PFWA); Geno Atkins, Cincinnati Bengals (AP, PFWA, SN); Justin Smith, San Francisco (SN)	Ndamukong Suh, Detroit Lions (AP-2); Haloti Ngata, Baltimore Ravens (AP-2t); Justin Smith, San Francisco 49ers (AP-2t)
Outside linebacker	Von Miller, Denver Broncos (AP, PFWA, SN); Aldon Smith, San Francisco 49ers (AP, PFWA, SN); DeMarcus Ware, Dallas (SN)	Chad Greenway, Minnesota (AP-2); Ahmad Brooks, San Francisco (AP-2t); Clay Matthews III, Green Bay (AP-2t); DeMarcus Ware, Dallas (AP-2t)
Inside linebacker	Patrick Willis, San Francisco 49ers (AP, PFWA); NaVorro Bowman, San Francisco 49ers (AP)	Daryl Washington, Arizona Cardinals (AP-2); London Fletcher, Washington (AP-2)
Cornerback	Charles Tillman, Chicago Bears (AP, PFWA, SN); Richard Sherman, Seattle Seahawks (AP, PFWA, SN)	Tim Jennings, Chicago (AP-2); Champ Bailey, Denver (AP-2)
Safety	Earl Thomas, Seattle Seahawks (AP, PFWA, SN); Dashon Goldson, San Francisco 49ers (AP); Eric Weddle, San Diego (PFWA); Jairus Byrd, Buffalo (SN)	Eric Weddle, San Diego (AP-2); Jairus Byrd, Buffalo (AP-2)

== Key ==
- AP = Associated Press first-team All-Pro
- AP-t = Tied for first-team All-Pro in the AP vote
- AP-2 = Associated Press second-team All-Pro
- AP-2t = Tied for second-team All-Pro in the AP vote
- PFWA = Pro Football Writers Association All-NFL
- SN = Sporting News All-Pro

== Position differences ==
- AP = chose no separate punt returner'
- AP = chose no separate special teams player
- x-two voters selected only one running back.
- y-one voter did not select a fullback.
- z-one voter selected only one inside linebacker
