= Butt Fumble =

Infamous American football play

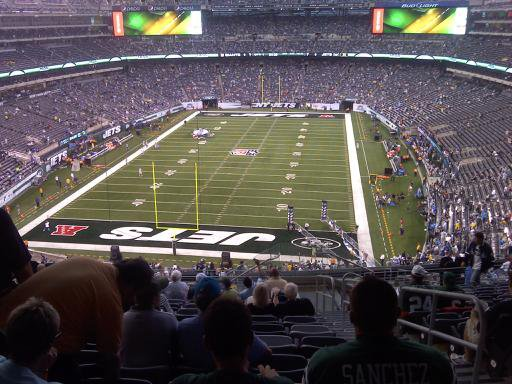
- MetLife Stadium, the site of the game, in 2010
New England Patriots (7–3)	New York Jets (4–6)
49	19
Head coach: Bill Belichick	Head coach: Rex Ryan
	1	2	3	4	Total
NE	0	35	0	14	49
NYJ	0	3	9	7	19
- Date: November 22, 2012
- Stadium: MetLife Stadium; East Rutherford, New Jersey
- Favorite: Patriots by 7
- Referee: Mike Carey
- Attendance: 79,088

TV in the United States
- Network: NBC
- Announcers: Al Michaels, Cris Collinsworth, and Michele Tafoya

The Butt Fumble was a notorious American football play from a National Football League (NFL) game played on Thanksgiving Day, November 22, 2012, between the New York Jets and New England Patriots.

In front of the home crowd of over 79,000 fans at MetLife Stadium and a primetime television audience of over 20 million, Jets quarterback Mark Sanchez collided with the buttocks of his teammate, offensive lineman Brandon Moore, causing a fumble, which was then recovered by the Patriots' safety Steve Gregory and returned for a touchdown. The play was the centerpiece of a disastrous sequence in the second quarter, wherein the Jets lost three fumbles and the Patriots scored three touchdowns in the span of 52 seconds of game time. In that second quarter, the Jets held the ball for over 12 minutes (out of a possible 15), but managed to be outscored 35–3.

The game and the infamous "butt fumble" in particular are remembered as the low point of the Jets' 2012 season as the embarrassing loss was the team's seventh of the 2012 season, all but eliminating them from earning a playoff berth. The butt fumble is often considered one of the most inept plays in NFL history and is also ranked as the most embarrassing moment in Jets history by ESPN.

== Background ==
=== Broadcast information ===
Beginning in 2006, the NFL began airing a late-season Thursday series of games every season. This included a third game played on Thanksgiving Night which, unlike the two other games played earlier on the holiday, would be hosted on a rotating basis. Initially these games aired on NFL Network, with the broadcast being available over-the-air in the teams' local markets.

NBC Sunday Night Football is the most important time slot for the NFL, which schedules the most attractive teams and games in it. For the 2012 season, NBC added the Thanksgiving evening broadcast to its lineup of games. This would be the first time that the Thanksgiving Night game would be broadcast on network television, and NBC expected a large portion of the available audience to tune in to the only NFL game nationwide. NBC's Sunday night staff worked on the game, including Al Michaels for play-by-play and Cris Collinsworth as color analyst.

The team's local radio broadcasts were carried on WEPN-FM in New York and WBZ-FM in Boston. Bob Wischusen and Marty Lyons called the matchup for the Jets while Gil Santos and Scott Zolak were at the microphone for the Patriots.

=== Teams ===
Head coach Bill Belichick's Patriots dominated the AFC East and the league during the previous decade. Head coach Rex Ryan and young quarterback Mark Sanchez had led the Jets to the AFC Championship Game in 2009 and 2010, however, including a rare playoff defeat of the Patriots in New England in January 2011. While the Jets did not make the playoffs in the 2011 season, fans thought that the team might in 2012 again challenge New England.

Both the Jets and the Patriots entered the week coming off of victories in their previous games. The Patriots, by defeating the Indianapolis Colts the week before, stood at 7-3 and were three games ahead in first place in the AFC East. The Jets were tied with the other two teams in the division, the Buffalo Bills and Miami Dolphins, at 4-6 following a victory over the St. Louis Rams one week earlier.

== Game summary ==
Week Twelve: New England Patriots at New York Jets – Game summary

Quarter	1	2	3	4	Total
Patriots	0	35	0	14	49
Jets	0	3	9	7	19

at MetLife Stadium, East Rutherford, New Jersey

- Date: November 22
- Game time: 8:20 p.m. EST
- Game weather: 46 °F (8 °C), clear
- Game attendance: 79,088
- Referee: Mike Carey
- TV announcers (NBC): Al Michaels, Cris Collinsworth and Michele Tafoya

Game information

First quarter

- No scoring plays

Second quarter

- NE – Wes Welker 3-yard pass from Tom Brady (Stephen Gostkowski kick), 14:54. Patriots 7–0. Drive: 15 plays, 66 yards, 6:01.
- NE – Shane Vereen 83-yard pass from Tom Brady (Stephen Gostkowski kick), 9:43. Patriots 14–0. Drive: 1 play, 83 yards, 0:13.
- NE – Steve Gregory 32-yard fumble return (Stephen Gostkowski kick), 9:00. Patriots 21–0.
- NE – Julian Edelman 22-yard fumble return (Stephen Gostkowski kick), 8:51. Patriots 28–0.
- NE – Julian Edelman 56-yard pass from Tom Brady (Stephen Gostkowski kick), 3:08. Patriots 35–0. Drive: 4 plays, 75 yards, 1:53.
- NYJ – Nick Folk 32-yard field goal, 0:07. Patriots 35–3. Drive: 14 plays, 68 yards, 3:06.

Third quarter

- NYJ – Stevan Ridley penalty in end zone, 6:52. Patriots 35–5.
- NYJ – Bilal Powell 4-yard run (Nick Folk kick), 4:41. Patriots 35–12. Drive: 4 plays, 67 yards, 2:06.

Fourth quarter

- NE – Tom Brady 1-yard run (Stephen Gostkowski kick), 12:02. Patriots 42–12. Drive: 17 plays, 86 yards, 7:39.
- NE – Stevan Ridley 9-yard run (Stephen Gostkowski kick), 11:07. Patriots 49–12. Drive: 2 plays, 37 yards, 0:38.
- NYJ – Dustin Keller 1-yard pass from Mark Sanchez (Nick Folk kick), 2:21. Patriots 49–19. Drive: 6 plays, 69 yards, 1:40.

Top passers

- NE – Tom Brady – 18/27, 323 yards, 3 TD
- NYJ – Mark Sanchez – 26/36, 301 yards, TD, INT

Top rushers

- NE – Stevan Ridley – 21 rushes, 97 yards, TD
- NYJ – Shonn Greene – 14 rushes, 71 yards

Top receivers

- NE – Shane Vereen – 2 receptions, 91 yards, TD
- NYJ – Jeremy Kerley – 7 receptions, 86 yards

=== Before the butt fumble ===
A scoreless first quarter ended with the Patriots driving to the Jets' 3-yard line. The second quarter began with a touchdown pass from Tom Brady to Wes Welker. The Jets answered with a drive to New England's 31-yard line. On 4th down with inches to go, however, the first of a series of mistakes took place that eventually resulted in the game being put out of reach.

=== Shonn Greene's fumble ===
Jets running back Shonn Greene was tackled short of the first-down marker by Patriots linebacker Brandon Spikes, losing possession as he was being tackled. The ball was recovered by Patriots safety Steve Gregory at the Patriots' 19-yard line and tackled at the 17. (Note: On fourth downs, only the offensive player who fumbles the ball can advance the ball beyond the spot of the fumble. Therefore, if any Jet other than Greene had touched the fumbled ball, it would have been ruled a dead ball at the spot of the fumble, and the Jets would turn the ball over on downs.)

The Patriots scored on the next play. Halfback Shane Vereen ran a wheel route out of the backfield to the left, beating Jets linebacker Bart Scott in man-to-man coverage. Scott was lined up too far inside, and a screen from Welker prevented Scott from reaching Vereen. Vereen caught Brady's pass around the Patriots' 25-yard line, and Vereen sprinted down the sideline for an 83-yard touchdown.

After a touchback, the Jets' next possession began with an 11-yard completion from Sanchez to Clyde Gates. With 9:10 remaining in the second quarter, the Jets had a 1st and 10 at their own 31-yard line. On the next play, the famous "butt fumble" ensued.

=== Butt fumble play ===
External videos
- NBC's footage of the play on the NFL's official YouTube channel

The Jets offense lined up in the I formation, with Sanchez immediately behind his center lineman, Fullback Lex Hilliard was lined up behind Sanchez in the I, with Greene, the deep back, behind Hilliard. The play call was for Sanchez to fake a toss to Greene running left, while Hilliard, running a dive play to the right, would instead take the hand-off from Sanchez.

When Sanchez took the snap, he mistakenly turned to the left, instead of handing off the ball in his right to Hilliard, and Hilliard ran past him. Trying to salvage the broken play, Sanchez scrambled forward towards the line of scrimmage. While this was going on, right guard Brandon Moore was attempting to block the Patriots' defensive tackle Vince Wilfork to protect the play and the two were locked together at the 32-yard line, next to the line of scrimmage. Sanchez decided to slide in order to protect himself and the ball, not realizing where he or the opposition's defensive tackle was.

As Sanchez began sliding, he collided with Moore's rear end, immediately losing both his balance and possession of the football.

Sanchez fell on to the turf and Moore fell on top of him; the football bounced out to the right side of the play, near the 32-yard line, directly in front of the Patriots' Gregory, the safety whose earlier recovery had resulted in Vereen's touchdown. Gregory collected the ball with his fingertips and ran untouched into the Jets' end zone for a scoop-and-score touchdown. With the extra point, the Patriots took a 21–0 lead.

=== Joe McKnight's fumble ===
The Jets then allowed another turnover and score on their next play. On the kickoff following the Butt Fumble touchdown, Jets return specialist Joe McKnight fumbled the ball into the air after he was hit by Devin McCourty. Patriots receiver Julian Edelman caught the fumble in mid-air and returned it 22 yards for New England's third touchdown in 52 seconds of play, giving them a 28–0 lead. The television cameras found Jets coach Ryan on the sideline exclaiming, "Un-fucking-believable!"

Some Jets fans left and others voiced their displeasure with the way the team had played so far. Many turned their ire on Sanchez and began chanting for Ryan to insert backup Tim Tebow into the game. However, the Jets did not disclose until after the game that Tebow had been nursing an injury and, despite listing him as active, would not play him in the game.

=== Rest of the game ===
By the two-minute warning before half time, the score was 35–0 after Edelman caught a 56-yard touchdown from Brady. The stadium loudspeakers played "It Ain't Over 'til It's Over."

Nick Folk put the Jets on the board before the half ended with a field goal and the Jets managed to get within 35-12 after a Patriots safety and a Bilal Powell run, but Brady and Stevan Ridley rushed for fourth quarter touchdowns and Dustin Keller caught a late touchdown to close out the scoring.

== Aftermath ==
One of the fans who left the game at halftime was Ed "Fireman Ed" Anzalone, the Jets' de facto mascot. Anzalone had grown increasingly frustrated with the way some fans were treating him, especially considering at the time he wore a Mark Sanchez jersey to games on a regular basis and the fanbase was starting to sour on him as the team's starting quarterback. After the game, Anzalone announced he would no longer be wearing his firefighter's helmet to games or leading cheers but he would still remain a fan of the Jets and attend whatever games he could. Anzalone eventually brought the helmet back in 2015.

NBC carried on the tradition of Thanksgiving games having a special award for the most valuable player(s) of the game, which was selected by John Madden. Gregory, Wilfork, and Brady each received the award for their performances during the contest. Gregory finished the game with two fumble recoveries, one for a touchdown, another forced fumble, and an interception.

Brady completed 18 of 27 passes for 323 yards and 3 touchdowns and rushed for another touchdown, earning an NFL passer rating of 144.5 and an ESPN total quarterback rating (QBR) of 82.4. Sanchez went 26 for 36 with 301 yards, one touchdown, one interception, and one fumble, for a passer rating of 94.8 and a QBR of 22.9.

The NBC broadcast began with over 24 million viewers, but viewers tuned out from the game as it turned into a blowout. The broadcast dropped below 15 million by 10 p.m., and it averaged a disappointing 19.2 million viewers—a distant third place to the two earlier games. The game was the second-highest-rated primetime show that week, behind the Sunday Night matchup between the Packers and the Giants.

Including the butt fumble, Sanchez lost the ball 24 times in the 2011 and 2012 seasons. In 2013, the Jets' new quarterbacks coach, David Lee, instituted a program to cut down on the fumbles by teaching Sanchez to hold the ball with both hands. In what Lee calls "The Sanchez Drill," the quarterback runs a gauntlet of people trying to knock the ball out of his hands with foam bats. Lee explained to the press, "Mark can win in this league. He has proven that. He's played for championships. I'm blatantly honest, brutally truthful at times. I told him, 'Hey, the best thing you can do to help our football team—the No.1 thing—is take care of the ball.'"

=== Reactions and analysis ===
In the Jets' postgame press conference, Sanchez explained: "I was thinking a different play in my head. That was a mental error there. As soon as I realized there was no one to hand it to I started to run toward the line and tried to cover it up and just get down and I slid right into Brandon Moore. I was just trying to get down. The play was over. Say 'Uncle'. Do the right thing. Get to second-and-10 and live to play another down. I'm not a big believer in luck, but that was pretty unlucky. It was really too bad." In an interview six days later, Sanchez described the play again: "It's embarrassing. You screw up the play and I'm trying to do the right thing. It's not like I'm trying to force something. I start to slide and I slide in the worst spot I possibly could—right into Brandon Moore. I guess [I was] more stunned than anything. Just like a car accident. I was like, 'Whoa. What just happened?' Then, the ball's gone. It was weird."

Facing forward, Moore could not see Sanchez miss the handoff, but he recalls that "You could feel it, you knew something wasn't right." When the fumble occurred, Moore was not aware that his buttocks had caused it; he learned of his role only after the game. When asked about the play, Moore answered, "Why do I need to talk about that? I don't understand why y'all keep asking about that play. ... I think it was a miscue with the handoff." After consulting Sanchez and his assistant coaches, Jets head coach Rex Ryan echoed the analysis: "My understanding is, I thought [Sanchez] reversed out the wrong way. That's what happened. It was a mental mistake and then he just tried to slide. When he did, he actually ran into Brandon."

There was some disagreement over Wilfork's role in causing the fumble. In the Patriots' postgame press conference, Wilfork recalled: "I was just fighting pressure with pressure—knowing, seeing the ball went that way. I'm just taught to fight pressure with pressure, so I just started fighting back and knocked him into Sanchez and it created a fumble." In NBC's television broadcast, immediately following the play, color commentator Cris Collinsworth said that "Vince Wilfork just threw Brandon Moore into Mark Sanchez," a view simultaneously echoed on the Patriots radio call by color analyst Scott Zolak. Moore disagreed with Collinsworth: "when somebody slides into the back of you, you're going to fall. That happens a lot in general. You don't know what's going on (behind you)." Responding to Moore, Collinsworth qualified his description in a phone interview with ESPN, saying that Wilfork could see the play develop, so "instead of trying to go around Moore, he pushed him back into the play and made the whole thing happen." A New York Daily News columnist sided with Moore, stating that "A second look at the play shows Moore holding his own against Wilfork and moving, if anything, mostly forward."

Gregory recalled of his performance in the game, "It was a good one for me today. Some of it was just the ball popping out and being in the right place at the right time. It was a team effort. The guys did a good job up front." Belichick said of Gregory's recovery of the fumble, "it was just a good scoop-and-score play."

== Postmortem ==
=== Jets ===
The Jets fell to 4–7 following the loss, which dealt a blow to their slim playoff hopes. The Jets would win their next game against the Arizona Cardinals, but Sanchez performed poorly again and Ryan sent out backup Greg McElroy to finish the game which the Jets only won 7–6. Sanchez returned for the next game, a win against the Jacksonville Jaguars, but a five-turnover loss to the Tennessee Titans in which Sanchez was responsible for all five turnovers, resulted in his benching. The Jets lost their last two games of the season to finish 6–10. Mark Sanchez would finish the season with 14 fumbles and 8 fumbles lost. It was the second most fumbles for a quarterback that season behind Philip Rivers with 15, as well as the most fumbles lost for an offensive player that season.

In the offseason that followed, several of the players involved in miscues in this game were not retained. Shonn Greene, whose fumble set the series of miscues in motion, was not retained by the Jets following the season and instead signed with Tennessee. Bart Scott, whose missed pickup caused the first touchdown to be scored, was released after the season and elected to retire to start a broadcasting career. Brandon Moore also followed Scott into retirement after the Jets elected not to renew his contract. Joe McKnight remained with the Jets through training camp the next season but was cut and spent 2013 out of football; he later moved to the CFL where he spent two years before being murdered in 2016.

As far as quarterbacks were concerned, after 2012 the team went in a different direction. Tim Tebow was released and never played in a regular season game again, and offensive coordinator Tony Sparano was fired. Then in the NFL draft, the Jets elected to take Geno Smith, a quarterback from West Virginia, in the second round and have Sanchez compete with him for the job. Sanchez would suffer a severe shoulder injury in the preseason and was released by the Jets following the 2013 season.

=== Patriots ===
The Patriots won four of their last five games to finish 12–4, winning the AFC East title and clinching the conference's #2 playoff seed. After defeating the Houston Texans in the Divisional Round, the Patriots faced the Baltimore Ravens in a rematch of the previous season's AFC Championship Game, which the Patriots won to advance to Super Bowl XLVI. This time, the Patriots came up short and lost to the Ravens, who would go on to win Super Bowl XLVII.

== Legacy ==
Producer Fred Gaudelli and other NBC staff immediately recognized the humor of the butt fumble, and repeatedly replayed it during the game. Within minutes, viral video spread on the Internet, and it was widely mocked in the news media over the following week. The Ringer speculated that the play was at the time one of the most famous sporting plays of the 21st century and added:

The Butt Fumble is a modern-art masterpiece. It is an indelible testament to a franchise's failure. It's the physical manifestation of the phrase "the agony of defeat." It's a monument to modern internet virality. It is both a symbol of Jets history and an inflection point that foreshadowed the decade to come—and still haunts the team to this day.

It was not the first butt fumble of 2012; a month earlier, Felix Jones of the Dallas Cowboys similarly lost the ball after hitting teammate Ryan Cook, causing some on Twitter to use the hashtag #buttfumble. The large Thanksgiving audience for the Patriots–Jets matchup, without another NFL game to watch, caused the term's association with the Sanchez–Moore play.

Players did not realize that the fumble was funny until they saw the replays on television at home. Brady said "The first time I saw it I laughed out loud to myself in a room by myself for 20 seconds". When Sanchez watched with some of his teammates, they were generally supportive. "Hopefully we'll laugh about it later", he said. Moore remarked of the play's popularity, "The littlest things nowadays turn into Internet sensations. It's not surprising". When asked if he found the play amusing, Moore answered, "No".

In August 2013, New York Post sports reporter Justin Terranova wrote that the butt fumble "has come to define Sanchez's downfall with the Jets". Terranova wrote that the play had unfairly overshadowed Sanchez's AFC Championship campaigns in the previous two seasons, as well as Moore's "ten years manning a generally-solid Jets offensive line". When Moore retired in 2013, he reflected on the play, "It's amusing to me that people think it's so amusing. The way I look at it, I don't think it should have any link to my career. I don't think it stands for what I was as a player for 10 years. I really don't give it much thought."

Shortly after the game, Sanchez remarked, "It's the way it goes and will probably be on a blooper reel for a while. That's just part of playing". He was correct. ESPN's SportsCenter's "Not Top 10" blooper reel segment aired every Friday morning during the daytime edition of the program. It featured a segment titled "Worst of the Worst", where fans voted online as to whether or not the #1 play on that week's Not Top 10 was worse than the play that had previously won the vote. The Butt Fumble was chosen as the worst play in the Not Top 10 that aired the day after the game, and fans chose it as the Worst of the Worst shortly thereafter.

Anchor Jay Crawford compared the lowlight with the Stanford Band's involvement in The Play during the 1982 Cal–Stanford Big Game, and with Jean van de Velde's meltdown at the 1999 Open Championship. Anchor Kevin Negandhi listed the ingredients that contribute to the play's longevity: it features a celebrity on a well-known team making an embarrassing mistake that is immediately punished by the opposing team scoring, and the comedic "butt fumble" nickname completes "the perfect storm."

Sanchez addressed the coverage in an August 2013 interview: "People ask me about the butt fumble and say, 'Gosh, doesn't that really bum you out?' Are you kidding me? You think every Friday if it comes on 'SportsCenter' I'm just down in the dumps? Who cares? I'm working out. I'm hanging with my family. I'm doing some charity thing. It's the last thing on my mind". The Ringer wrote in 2022 that "the Butt Fumble effectively ended the Mark Sanchez era", and the Jets' hopes of countering Belichick and the Patriots' dominance.

For forty consecutive weeks, each Not Top 10 finished with the Butt Fumble as the Worst of the Worst. Not only were fans still voting for it nearly ten months after it originally occurred, none of the plays that made the worst of the week before even came close to defeating it in the Worst of the Worst vote. On September 6, 2013, ESPN decided that it was time to move on from the Butt Fumble and retired the play from further Worst of the Worst consideration. (Note: SportsCenter eventually retired the "Worst of the Worst" portion of their "Not Top 10" segment altogether after last airing it on November 27, 2015.) A SportsCenter producer explained that it was time to "start fresh" as the 2013 NFL season began. Negandhi concluded, "Time to get some new material and years from now, when we see a really bad play, we'll say, 'But can it compare to the Butt Fumble?' That is setting a legacy." Before retiring the play, ESPN subjected it to analysis on its "Sports Science" segment. In this segment, they show how Sanchez's speed combined with the angle of impact created a force of over 1,300 pounds, well over the 125 pounds required to cause a fumble.

The NFL auctioned Sanchez's jersey from the game in May 2015 for charity for $820. The winning bidder, Jake Hendrickson, a life long Jets fan, said that friends had often ridiculed him about the play, and he bought the jersey to prevent an "anti-fan" from doing so. He said he would frame and display it until the Jets win another Super Bowl, and then shoot it into space. CBS Sports joked, "So basically, the jersey will be up on his wall forever".

On September 29, 2013, another buttock-related fumble involved the NY Jets. In a 38–13 loss at the Titans, new Jets starter Geno Smith was sacked by Titans defensive end Karl Klug; Smith tried to switch the ball behind his back but it brushed off his buttocks and Klug grabbed it and rolled into the end zone.

In 2019, the NFL named the Butt Fumble the 99th greatest play of all time. Gaudelli, who had been the producer for half of the top ten plays on the list, said that the Butt Fumble was the funniest play of the NFL's first 100 years.

The play was included as one of the top picks in the 2021 book, Butt Fumbles, Fake Spikes, Mud Bowls & Heidi Games: The Top 100 Debacles of the New York Jets, by Greg Prato.

During a Week 3 matchup in the 2022 NFL season between the Miami Dolphins and Buffalo Bills, Dolphins' punter Thomas Morstead, out of his own endzone, punted a ball off his teammate Trent Sherfield's buttocks, leading to a safety. This led to Sanchez poking fun at Morstead, tweeting "stay out of my lane bro". The play was nicknamed the Butt Punt by fans. The Dolphins won the game 21–19.

During the ten years after the Butt Fumble, the Patriots were 18–2 against the Jets. The latter was the only team to have never made the playoffs since the fumble, the only to have not scored 3,000 points, tied for the most turnovers, and have the worst turnover margin. In addition, the Jets would not return to NBC Sunday Night Football until 2023.

"Butt Fumble" is the official NFL name for the play.

This final score of 49–19 was the 1,000th instance of "Scorigami", in which a final score occurs for the first time in league history. As of 2026, it remains the only 49–19 final score in NFL history.

== See also ==
- Jets–Patriots rivalry
- List of nicknamed NFL games and plays
