= Brandon Moore (guard) =

American football player (born 1980)

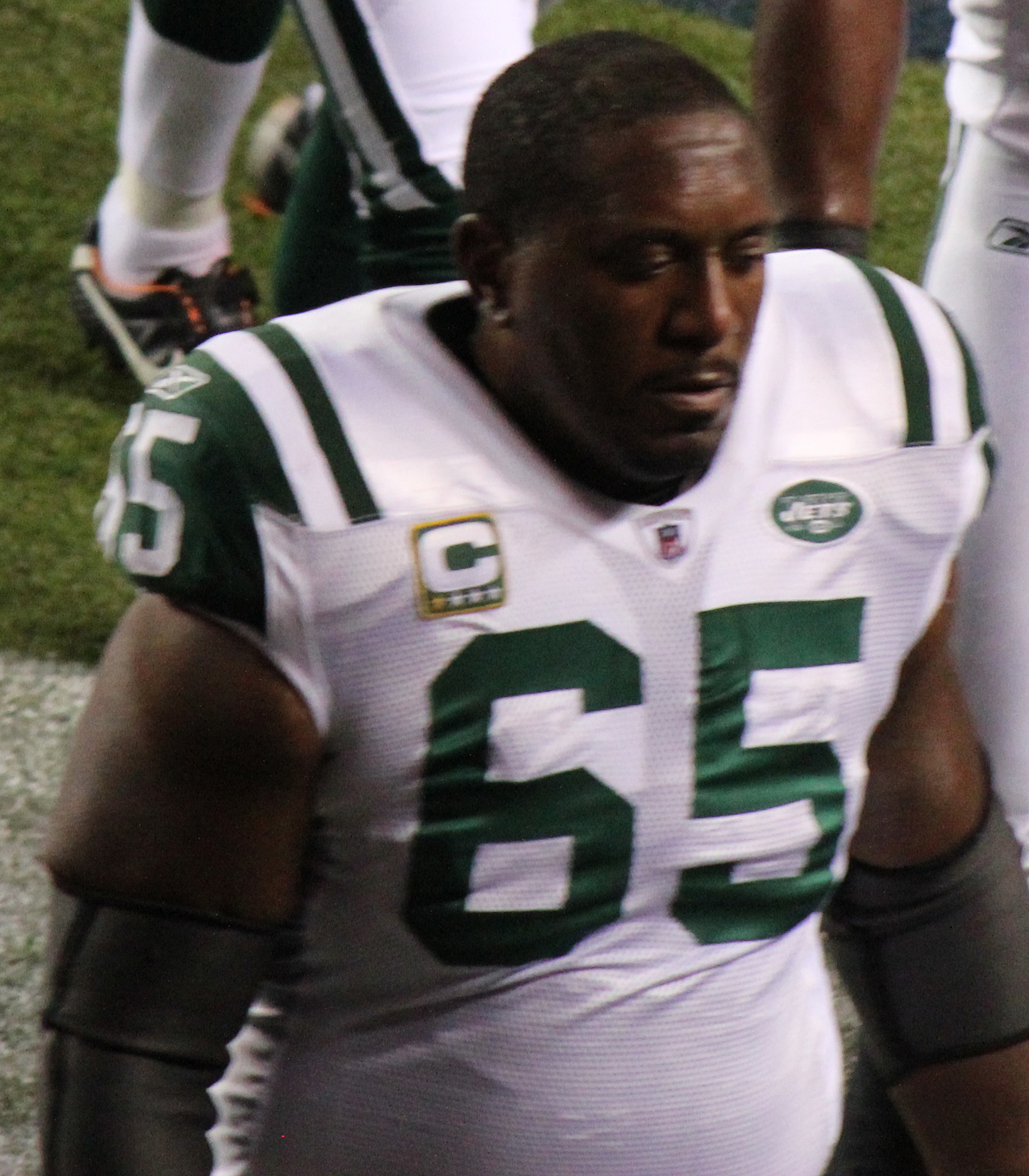
- Moore in 2011.

No. 65
- Position: Offensive guard

Personal information
- Born: June 3, 1980 (age 46); Gary, Indiana, U.S.
- Listed height: 6 ft 3 in (1.91 m)
- Listed weight: 305 lb (138 kg)

Career information
- High school: West Side (Gary)
- College: Illinois
- NFL draft: 2002: undrafted

Career history
- New York Jets (2002)*; Scottish Claymores (2003); New York Jets (2003–2012); Dallas Cowboys (2013)*
- * Offseason or practice squad member only

Awards and highlights
- Pro Bowl (2011); All-Big Ten (2001)

Career NFL statistics
- Games played: 144
- Games started: 142
- Stats at Pro Football Reference

Career AFL statistics
- Total tackles: 1
- Stats at ArenaFan.com

Brandon Lamont Moore (born June 3, 1980) is an American former professional football player who was a guard for 10 seasons with the New York Jets of the National Football League (NFL). He was signed by the Jets as an undrafted free agent in 2002 after playing college football for the Illinois Fighting Illini. Moore was to sign with the Dallas Cowboys during the 2013 season but opted to retire.

== College career ==
Moore attended the University of Illinois at Urbana–Champaign, where he played defensive tackle. Moore was a starter for the Fighting Illini for three seasons, and was named All-Big Ten in his senior season. Moore graduated from Illinois with a bachelor's degree in English.

== Professional career ==
Pre-draft measurables
Height	Weight	40-yard dash	10-yard split	20-yard split	20-yard shuttle	Three-cone drill	Vertical jump	Broad jump	Bench press
6 ft 3 1/8 in (1.91 m)	293 lb (133 kg)	5.22 s	1.78 s	3.00 s	4.64 s	7.84 s	25.5 in (0.65 m)	8 ft 0 in (2.44 m)	32 reps
All values from NFL Combine

=== New York Jets ===
Moore signed with the New York Jets as an undrafted free agent on April 26, 2002. After spending time with the practice squad and with the Scottish Claymores, as well as with the Carolina Cobras of the Arena Football League, Moore first saw action in 2003, appearing in three games and starting one. Moore started 13 games in 2004, helping running back Curtis Martin lead the NFL in rushing yards. The Jets released Moore on February 26, 2009; however, he was re-signed the next day.

After being considered one of the top guards in the NFL for several years, Moore was finally selected to his first Pro Bowl after the 2011–2012 season.

Moore is probably most known for his role in the infamous "Butt Fumble" against the New England Patriots on Thanksgiving Day 2012. On the play, Jets quarterback Mark Sanchez face planted into Moore's rear-end and fumbled the ball, and it was returned for a touchdown by Steve Gregory.

=== Dallas Cowboys ===
On August 7, 2013, Moore signed a one-year deal with the Dallas Cowboys. Shortly after, he announced his retirement saying that he "could not bring himself to get on a plane and leave his family".

== Personal life ==
His brother, Julian, played football at Central State University in Wilberforce, Ohio.
