= Tracy Robertson =

American football player (born 1989)

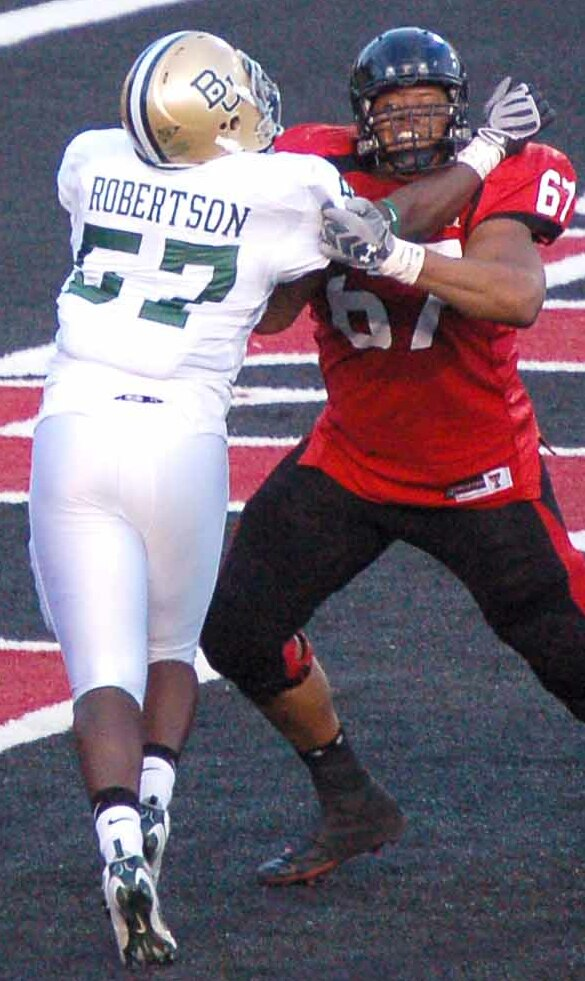
- Robertson with Baylor in 2008

No. 98
- Position: Defensive tackle

Personal information
- Born: September 26, 1989 (age 37); Houston, Texas, U.S.
- Listed height: 6 ft 4 in (1.93 m)
- Listed weight: 280 lb (127 kg)

Career information
- College: Baylor
- NFL draft: 2012: undrafted

Career history
- Houston Texans (2012)*; Detroit Lions (2012)*; New England Patriots (2012)*; Miami Dolphins (2013)*; Chicago Bears (2013–2014); Toronto Argonauts (2015–2016)
- * Offseason or practice squad member only

Career CFL statistics
- Tackles: 11
- Sacks: 0
- Interceptions: 0
- Fumble recoveries: 0
- Stats at CFL.ca (archived)
- Stats at Pro Football Reference

Tracy Floyd Robertson (born September 26, 1989) is an American former professional football defensive tackle. He played college football at Baylor. He signed with the Houston Texans as an undrafted free agent in 2012. Robertson is now a coach at Jordan High School (Fulshear, Texas).

== Early life ==
Robertson attended Lamar High School in Houston, Texas. Robertson was selected to the first team All-District 20-5A honors. Robertson finished high school with 83 tackles, 11 sacks along with 2 fumble recoveries. Robertson was named one of state's Top 25 defensive linemen by Texas Football magazine.

College recruiting
Name	Hometown	School	Height	Weight	40^{‡}	Commit date
Tracy Robertson; Defensive end	Houston, Texas	Lamar High School	6 ft 5 in (1.96 m)	230 lb (100 kg)	4.70 (according to Scout.com)	Dec 14, 2007
Tracy Robertson; Defensive end	Recruit ratings: Scout: Rivals:					
Overall recruit ranking: Scout: 82 (DE) Rivals: -- (DE), -- (AL)
‡ Refers to 40-yard dash; Note: In many cases, Scout, Rivals, 247Sports, On3, and ESPN may conflict in their listings of height, weight and 40 time.; In these cases, the average was taken. ESPN grades are on a 100-point scale.; Sources: "Baylor Football Commitments". Rivals.; "2008 Baylor Football Recruiting Commits". Scout.; "Scout.com Team Recruiting Rankings". Scout.; "2008 Team Ranking". Rivals.com.

== College career ==
He played college football at Baylor University. During his tenure in Baylor, he recorded 44 tackles and 7.5 sacks. He played in 44 games and started 27 of them.

In his freshman year, he played 9 games coming off bench. On October 4, 2008, he recorded a season high 2 Tackles against the No.1 ranked Oklahoma but Baylor lost in a blowout 49-17. On November 1, 2008, he had just one tackle against Missouri but Baylor lost 31-28.

In his sophomore year, he played in all 12 games, and started at defensive end. He finished the season with 22 tackles, including 5 tackles for loss, 3 sacks. On October 17, 2009, he recorded a career high 5 tackles against Iowa State but Baylor lost 10-24. On November 7, 2009, he recorded 5 tackles and 2 sacks against Missouri and Baylor won 40-32. On November 28, 2009, in the season finale against Texas Tech, he recorded 2 tackles and one sack but Baylor lost 20-13. Baylor finished the 2009 season with a 4-8 record.

In his junior year, he played 10 games and started 9 of them. He started the season as a defensive tackle until the fourth game. He missed the next three games due to injury. On September 11, 2010, he recorded 3 tackles, including two tackles, and three QB hurries against Buffalo in which Baylor won 34-6. On October 16, 2010, he just recorded 2 tackles against Colorado and Baylor won 31-25. On October 23, 2010, he recorded 4 tackles Kansas State contributing to Baylor winning the game by the final score of 47-42.

In his senior year, he played in 13 games and started 11 games and he recorded 23 tackles and 4.5 sacks. On October 1, 2011, he recorded 4 tackles and 2 sacks against Kansas State but Baylor lost 36-35. In next game against Iowa State, he recorded one sack while Baylor won 49-26.

== Professional career ==
=== Houston Texans ===
After going undrafted in the 2012 NFL draft, he was signed by the Houston Texans. On July 30, 2012, he was released.

=== Detroit Lions ===
On August 2, 2012, he signed with the Detroit Lions. On August 31, 2012, he was released on the final day of roster cuts.

=== New England Patriots ===
On January 1, 2013, Robertson was signed to the New England Patriots practice squad. On April 29, 2013, the Patriots released Robertson.

=== Miami Dolphins ===
On June 13, 2013, he signed with the Miami Dolphins. On August 31, 2013, he was released by the Dolphins.

=== Chicago Bears ===
On October 14, 2013, he was signed to the Chicago Bears practice squad. On November 22, he was promoted to the active roster, making his debut in week twelve against the St. Louis Rams, but was released on November 29. He returned to the practice squad on December 3. On August 30, 2014, he was part of the final cuts by the Bears.

=== Toronto Argonauts ===
On February 5, 2014, it was announced that Robertson had signed with the Toronto Argonauts.
