= Steve Gregory (American football) =

American football player and coach (born 1983)

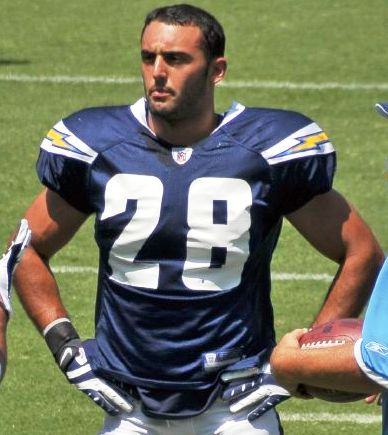
- Gregory with the San Diego Chargers in 2008

Vanderbilt Commodores
- Title: Defensive coordinator

Personal information
- Born: January 8, 1983 (age 43); Brooklyn, New York, U.S.
- Listed height: 5 ft 11 in (1.80 m)
- Listed weight: 200 lb (91 kg)

Career information
- High school: Curtis (Staten Island, New York)
- College: Syracuse
- NFL draft: 2006: undrafted

Career history

Playing
- San Diego Chargers (2006–2011); New England Patriots (2012–2013); Kansas City Chiefs (2014)*
- * Offseason or practice squad member only

Coaching
- Syracuse (2015) Quality control assistant; Detroit Lions (2018–2019) Defensive assistant; Detroit Lions (2020) Defensive backs coach; Miami Dolphins (2021) Defensive assistant; Miami Dolphins (2022) Safeties coach; Vanderbilt (2024) Senior consultant/associate defensive coordinator; Vanderbilt (2025–present) Defensive coordinator

Career NFL statistics
- Total tackles: 357
- Forced fumbles: 2
- Pass deflections: 24
- Interceptions: 7
- Defensive touchdowns: 2
- Stats at Pro Football Reference

Stephen C. Gregory (born January 8, 1983) is an American football coach and a former safety who is currently the defensive coordinator at Vanderbilt. He was signed by the San Diego Chargers as an undrafted free agent in 2006. He played college football and coached at Syracuse. Gregory was also a member of the New England Patriots and Kansas City Chiefs.

== Early life ==
Gregory lived in Staten Island, New York, for most of his youth. He was a Jets fan growing up. He attended St. Margaret Mary Parochial Elementary school grades 6–8 then attended Monsignor Farrell High School before transferring to Curtis High School. He played college football at Syracuse University.

== Professional career ==
=== San Diego Chargers ===
The defender started his career as an undrafted free agent, and signed with the San Diego Chargers as an undrafted free agent in 2006. He played for them until 2011. He started 31 of 85 games, recording 241 tackles, four interceptions and two sacks.

=== New England Patriots ===
On March 15, 2012, Gregory signed with the New England Patriots. On Thanksgiving Night, Gregory had a primary role in the Patriots' victory over his home-town team, the New York Jets. In the game, Gregory had an interception, 2 recovered fumbles (one leading to a touchdown, during the now-infamous "Butt Fumble" play), 5 tackles, and 1 pass deflection. At the end of the game, on the national NBC broadcast, Gregory was awarded the traditional Thanksgiving award, along with teammates Tom Brady and Vince Wilfork.

Between 2012 and 2014, he started 23 games for the New England Patriots. Gregory was released by the Patriots on February 28, 2014.

=== Kansas City Chiefs and retirement ===
Gregory was signed by the Kansas City Chiefs on July 31, 2014. Gregory announced his retirement from football on August 9, 2014. He cited the birth of his daughter with his wife Rosanne as giving him a new perspective on life, with plans to coach. He ended his career with 357 tackles, seven interceptions, 25 defensed passes, three sacks and two touchdowns, out of 111 NFL games.

== Coaching career ==
On June 4, 2015, the Syracuse athletic department announced Gregory would return to his alma mater as a special teams quality control coach.

=== Detroit Lions ===
Two years after his year coaching at Syracuse, Gregory joined the Detroit Lions as a defensive assistant. He was promoted to defensive backs coach in 2020, and he missed the team's week 16 game against the Tampa Bay Buccaneers due to COVID-19 protocols.

=== Miami Dolphins ===
In 2021, Gregory joined the Dolphins as a defensive assistant, where he would reunite with Dolphins head coach Brian Flores, whom coached Gregory with the New England Patriots where Flores was his Safeties coach. In 2022, he was retained by Mike McDaniel and was promoted to the Dolphins safeties coach. He was fired on January 19, 2023.

== NFL career statistics ==
Legend
**Bold**	Career high

Year	Team	GP	Tackles				Fumbles		Interceptions			
Year	Team	GP	Cmb	Solo	Ast	Sck	FF	FR	Int	Yds	TD	PD
2006	SD	14	12	8	4	0.0	0	0	0	0	0	1
2007	SD	16	11	10	1	0.0	0	0	0	0	0	1
2008	SD	15	36	31	5	0.0	0	0	0	0	0	4
2009	SD	16	71	**58**	13	**2.0**	0	**2**	1	13	0	0
2010	SD	9	44	34	10	0.0	0	0	2	41	0	2
2011	SD	15	67	56	11	0.0	0	0	1	26	**1**	3
2012	NE	12	37	31	6	0.0	**2**	**2**	**3**	**50**	**1**	**5**
2013	NE	14	**79**	50	**29**	1.0	0	0	0	0	0	2
Total		111	357	278	79	3.0	2	4	7	130	2	24
