= 2009 New England Patriots season =

50th season in franchise history

- Patriots 50th season logo
- Owner: Robert Kraft
- Head coach: Bill Belichick
- Defensive coordinator: Dean Pees
- Home stadium: Gillette Stadium

Results
- Record: 10–6
- Division place: 1st AFC East
- Playoffs: Lost Wild Card Playoffs (vs. Ravens) 14–33
- All-Pros: 3: WR Wes Welker (1st team); G Logan Mankins (2nd team); DT Vince Wilfork (2nd team)
- Pro Bowlers: 6: QB Tom Brady; WR Wes Welker; WR Randy Moss; G Logan Mankins; DT Vince Wilfork; FS Brandon Meriweather

Uniform

The 2009 season was the New England Patriots' 40th in the National Football League (NFL), their 50th overall and their 10th under head coach Bill Belichick. They finished with a 10–6 record and a division title before losing to the Baltimore Ravens in the playoffs.

This was the first of eleven consecutive AFC East titles for the Patriots. After missing the playoffs in 2008, the Patriots' offseason was marked by a number of front office, coaching, and personnel changes. Vice President of Player Personnel Scott Pioli, who had been head coach Bill Belichick's personnel director since 2000, departed to become the general manager of the Kansas City Chiefs, while offensive coordinator Josh McDaniels was named head coach of the Denver Broncos. Quarterback Matt Cassel, who led the team to 11 wins in 2008 after starter Tom Brady was injured, was traded to the Chiefs along with veteran linebacker Mike Vrabel in March. Defensive starters Tedy Bruschi and Rodney Harrison both retired, while All-Pro defensive end Richard Seymour was traded to the Oakland Raiders for a first round pick in the 2011 NFL draft days before the start of the regular season.

In the season opener on Monday Night Football, the Patriots celebrated their 50th anniversary season with an American Football League "legacy game" against the Buffalo Bills. Down 11 points late in the fourth quarter, the Patriots would score two touchdowns to secure a victory in Brady's first game back from injury. In November, the 6–2 Patriots traveled to face the undefeated Indianapolis Colts; with a six-point lead late in the fourth quarter, the Patriots tried to convert a 4th and 2 situation inside their own 30-yard line but failed, setting up a Colts touchdown and the Patriots' third loss of the season. After losing another two games of three, the Patriots went on to win their next three games to secure a division title; the team also finished with their fourth perfect regular season record at home in seven years. With the third seed in the AFC playoffs, the Patriots faced the Baltimore Ravens at home in the Wild Card Playoffs. The Ravens opened a 24–0 lead in the first quarter and the Patriots could not recover, ending their season, the Pats suffered their first one-and-done postseason campaign since 1998 and the first in the Brady-Belichick era. The Patriots would not fail to clinch another first-round bye in the playoffs until 2019.

== Offseason ==
=== Staff changes ===
With the Patriots' 2008 season ending more than a month before its 2007 season did, the month of January, reserved for playoff games in the prior five seasons, instead saw the departure of head coach Bill Belichick's top personnel executive in his first nine seasons in New England. Vice President of Player Personnel Scott Pioli accepted an offer to become the general manager of the Kansas City Chiefs, giving him final say over all of the team's football matters. Nick Caserio, the Patriots' director of player personnel, took over Pioli's duties of overseeing the Patriots' personnel and scouting departments, while former Tennessee Titans general manager Floyd Reese was given a multi-year contract to be a "senior football advisor." Meanwhile, assistant director of college scouting Jon Robinson was promoted to director of college scouting, and former assistant director of player personnel Jason Licht, who had moved from the Patriots to the Philadelphia Eagles and the Arizona Cardinals as a personnel executive, returned to the Patriots as director of pro personnel. National scout Bob Quinn was promoted to assistant director of pro personnel.

Belichick's coaching staff faced similar changes at the beginning of the 2009 offseason. Offensive coordinator and quarterbacks coach Josh McDaniels agreed to become the head coach of the Denver Broncos, which at the time of his hiring made him the youngest head coach in the NFL. Wide receivers coach Bill O'Brien replaced McDaniels as quarterbacks coach, but no official replacement for offensive coordinator was named. Minnesota Vikings assistant special teams coach and offensive assistant Chad O'Shea replaced O'Brien as wide receivers coach. In addition, special teams coach Brad Seely agreed to join the Cleveland Browns as their assistant head coach/special teams coach under new head coach and former Patriots assistant Eric Mangini. Former Denver Broncos special teams coach Scott O'Brien was named as a replacement. Tight ends coach Pete Mangurian joined the Tampa Bay Buccaneers as their offensive line coach after the season; offensive coaching assistant Shane Waldron replaced him. Scouting assistant Brian Ferentz replaced Waldron as an offensive coaching assistant. On defense, special assistant/secondary coach Dom Capers joined the Green Bay Packers as their defensive coordinator and was replaced by defensive coaching assistant Josh Boyer as defensive backs coach. Boyer was replaced as a coaching assistant by Patrick Graham, who was a defensive graduate assistant for former Patriots assistant Charlie Weis at the University of Notre Dame before being hired by the University of Toledo as a defensive line coach weeks before joining the Patriots.

=== Departures ===
Quarterback Matt Cassel, who started 15 of the Patriots' games in 2008 after an injury to starter Tom Brady, was an unrestricted free agent after the season under the terms of his 2005 seventh-round draft pick contract. On February 5, the first day teams were allowed to place the franchise tag on a player, the Patriots assigned Cassel the non-exclusive version of the tag, tying up $14.65 million, the required amount of a one-year guaranteed tender, of their salary cap space. The tag allowed Cassel to negotiate with other teams, but any team signing Cassel to an offer sheet the Patriots refused to match would have had to surrender two first-round draft picks to the Patriots. Nevertheless, Cassel quickly agreed to the terms of the tag and signed it, putting him under contract with the Patriots for the 2009 season and guaranteeing him the tender salary, but also denying him the right to negotiate without permission. On February 28, the second day of free agency, Cassel and linebacker Mike Vrabel, who was in the final year of his contract, were traded to the Chiefs for the Chiefs' second-round draft pick in 2009 (#34 overall), in the first trade between Belichick and Pioli, his former colleague.

Prior to the start of free agency, the Patriots released wide receiver Kelley Washington and offensive lineman Billy Yates; Yates was re-signed days later to a revised contract. Unrestricted free agents, wide receiver Jabar Gaffney, long snapper Lonie Paxton, and running back LaMont Jordan all joined McDaniels and the Denver Broncos. Fullback Heath Evans signed with the New Orleans Saints and linebacker Larry Izzo signed with the New York Jets.

During the second day of the draft, cornerback Ellis Hobbs was traded to the Philadelphia Eagles for two 2009 fifth-round draft selections.

On June 4, safety Rodney Harrison, who became a free agent following the 2008 season, retired from football.

On August 17, the Patriots traded defensive end Le Kevin Smith to the Denver Broncos with a seventh-round pick in the 2010 NFL Draft acquired in a trade with the Philadelphia Eagles (see below) in exchange for the Broncos' 2010 fifth-round pick, which became the selection that went to the Oakland Raiders in a prior trade. On August 25, the Patriots again traded with the Broncos, this time sending guard Russ Hochstein to the Broncos for the same seventh-round draft selection in the 2010 draft.

After playing in the team's first three preseason games as a reserve, linebacker Tedy Bruschi announced his retirement on August 31, after 13 seasons with the Patriots.

During final roster cutdowns, on September 5, the Patriots traded tight end David Thomas to the New Orleans Saints in exchange for a conditional seventh-round pick in the 2011 NFL draft, which later became a sixth-round pick.

The next day, the Patriots traded All-Pro defensive end Richard Seymour to the Oakland Raiders in exchange for a first-round selection in the 2011 NFL Draft.

=== Arrivals ===
The Patriots signed a number of players who had been released by their former teams: longtime Jacksonville Jaguars running back Fred Taylor, cornerbacks Shawn Springs and Leigh Bodden, tight end Chris Baker, wide receiver Joey Galloway, long snapper Nathan Hodel, and linebacker Tully Banta-Cain, who was a member of the Patriots from 2003 through 2006 before signing a free agent contract with the San Francisco 49ers. Center Al Johnson, offensive tackle Damane Duckett, safety Brandon McGowan, and linebacker Paris Lenon arrived via unrestricted free agency; only McGowan made the Patriots' opening roster. Free agents or potential free agents Eric Alexander, James Sanders, Russ Hochstein, Chris Hanson, Mike Wright, Tank Williams, Ray Ventrone, Pierre Woods, and Kenny Smith were all re-signed. Restricted free agent offensive tackle Wesley Britt was not offered a tender, making him an unrestricted free agent, but he was later re-signed. In August, offensive tackles Nick Kaczur and Mark LeVoir both received contract extensions through the 2012 and 2011 seasons, respectively. During the season, the team reached long-term contract extensions with linebacker Rob Ninkovich, guard Dan Connolly, wide receiver Sam Aiken, and linebacker Eric Alexander.

In the first week of the free agency, the Patriots traded their fifth-round pick in the 2009 NFL draft to the Philadelphia Eagles for wide receiver Greg Lewis and the Eagles' seventh-round pick in the 2010 NFL draft. Shortly after the draft, the Patriots acquired tight end Alex Smith from the Tampa Bay Buccaneers in exchange for a fifth-round pick in the 2010 NFL Draft. Smith was released by the Patriots during roster cutdowns on September 5, while Lewis was released two days later.

On August 6, the Patriots acquired defensive end Derrick Burgess from the Oakland Raiders in exchange for third- and fifth-round selections in the 2010 NFL Draft. The Patriots, without a fifth-round selection at the time, originally sent a fourth-round pick to the Raiders with the condition it would become a fifth-round pick once the team acquired one. A fifth-round pick was then acquired in the Le Kevin Smith trade and sent to the Raiders instead of the fourth-round selection.

During final roster cutdowns, on September 5, the Patriots acquired tight end Michael Matthews from the New York Giants in exchange for a conditional draft choice in the 2011 NFL Draft. He was waived on October 20; the condition for the trade was not met, meaning the Patriots did not surrender their draft choice.

On September 22, in the third week of the season, the Patriots acquired linebacker Prescott Burgess from the Baltimore Ravens in exchange for a conditional seventh-round draft choice. He was waived by the Patriots six days later. Since the trade was conditioned on Burgess being active for a certain number of games, and since Burgess was inactive in the only game for which he was with the Patriots, the Patriots kept the pick.

=== 2009 NFL draft ===
2009 New England Patriots draft
Round	Pick	Player	Position	College	Notes
2	34	Patrick Chung	Safety	Oregon	from Kansas City (Note: The Patriots traded Matt Cassel and Mike Vrabel to the Kansas City Chiefs for the Chiefs' second-round pick (#34 overall).)
2	40	Ron Brace	Defensive tackle	Boston College	from Oakland (Note: The Patriots traded second-, fourth-, and sixth-round picks (#47, #124, and No. 199 overall) to the Oakland Raiders for the Raiders' second-round pick (#40 overall). The Patriots received the No. 47 overall pick with a 2008 fifth-round pick in a trade with the San Diego Chargers for the Patriots' 2008 third-round pick. The Patriots received the third-round pick in a trade with the Oakland Raiders in which the Raiders traded their 2008 third-round pick and 2007 seventh-round pick for the Patriots' third-round pick in 2007.)
2	41	Darius Butler	Cornerback	Connecticut	from Green Bay (Note: The Patriots traded first- and fifth-round picks (#26 and No. 162 overall) to the Green Bay Packers for the Packers' second-round selection (#41 overall) and third-round selections (#73 and No. 83 overall). The Patriots received the first- and fifth-round picks (#26 and No. 162 overall) in a trade with the Baltimore Ravens for the Patriots' 2009 first-round selection (#23 overall).)
2	58	Sebastian Vollmer	Offensive tackle	Houston	
3	83	Brandon Tate	Wide receiver	North Carolina	from New York Jets via Green Bay
3	97	Tyrone McKenzie	Linebacker	South Florida	compensatory selection
4	123	Rich Ohrnberger	Offensive guard	Penn State	from Baltimore (Note: The Patriots traded fifth-round picks (#137 and No. 141 overall) to the Baltimore Ravens for fourth- and sixth-round selections (#123 and No. 198 overall). The Patriots received the No. 137 and No. 141 overall picks in a trade with the Philadelphia Eagles for Ellis Hobbs.)
5	170	George Bussey	Offensive guard	Louisville	compensatory selection
6	198	Jake Ingram	Long snapper	Hawaii	from Baltimore
6	207	Myron Pryor	Defensive tackle	Kentucky	compensatory selection
7	232	Julian Edelman	Wide receiver	Kent State	from Miami via Jacksonville (Note: The Patriots traded a third-round selection (#73 overall) to the Jacksonville Jaguars for the Jaguars' 2010 second-round pick and 2009 seventh-round pick (#232 overall). The Patriots received the No. 73 overall pick with a third-round pick (#83 overall) and a second-round pick (#41 overall) in a trade with the Green Bay Packers for the Patriots' 2009 first- and fifth-round picks (#26 and No. 162 overall). The Patriots received the first- and fifth-round picks (#26 and No. 162 overall) in a trade with the Baltimore Ravens for the Patriots' 2009 first-round selection (#23 overall).)
7	234	Darryl Richard	Defensive tackle	Georgia Tech	
Made roster

The Patriots traded their original fifth-round selection (#159 overall) to the Philadelphia Eagles in exchange for wide receiver Greg Lewis and a seventh-round pick in the 2010 NFL draft.

2009 New England Patriots Draft Day Trades
Round	Overall	Team	Received
1	23	to Baltimore Ravens	Received Baltimore's first-round pick and fifth-round pick (26 and 162 overall)
1	26	to Green Bay Packers	Received Green Bay's second-round pick (41 overall) and third-round picks (73 and 83 overall)
5	162	to Green Bay Packers	Received Green Bay's second-round pick (41 overall) and third-round picks (73 and 83 overall)
2	47	to Oakland Raiders	Received Oakland's second-round pick (40 overall)
4	124	to Oakland Raiders	Received Oakland's second-round pick (40 overall)
6	199	to Oakland Raiders	Received Oakland's second-round pick (40 overall)
3	73	to Jacksonville Jaguars	Received Jacksonville's seventh-round pick (232 overall) and 2010 second-round pick
3	89	to Tennessee Titans	Received Tennessee's 2010 second-round pick
Ellis Hobbs		to Philadelphia Eagles	Received Philadelphia's fifth-round picks (137 and 141 overall)
5	137	to Baltimore Ravens	Received Baltimore's fourth-round pick and sixth-round pick (123 and 198 overall)
5	141	to Baltimore Ravens	Received Baltimore's fourth-round pick and sixth-round pick (123 and 198 overall)

== Staff ==
2009 New England Patriots staff
Front office: Chairman/CEO – Robert Kraft; President – Jonathan Kraft; Senior football advisor – Floyd Reese; Director of player personnel – Nick Caserio; Director of college scouting – Jon Robinson; Director of pro personnel – Jason Licht; Assistant director of pro personnel – Bob Quinn; Football research director – Ernie Adams; Head coaches: Head coach – Bill Belichick; Assistant head coach/offensive line – Dante Scarnecchia; Offensive coaches: Quarterbacks – Bill O'Brien; Running backs – Ivan Fears; Receivers – Chad O'Shea; Tight ends – Shane Waldron; Coaching assistant – Brian Ferentz; Coaching assistant – Brian Flores	Defensive coaches: Defensive coordinator – Dean Pees; Defensive line – Pepper Johnson; Linebackers – Matt Patricia; Defensive backs – Josh Boyer; Coaching assistant – Patrick Graham; Special teams coaches: Special teams – Scott O'Brien; Strength and conditioning: Strength and conditioning – Mike Woicik; Assistant strength and conditioning – Harold Nash

== Opening training camp roster ==
As of the Patriots' first training camp practice at Gillette Stadium on July 30, they had the NFL maximum of 80 players signed to their roster (injured third-round pick Tyrone McKenzie, who was not signed until after training camp began, did not count against that limit until his signing). Additionally, rookies Eric Kettani and Tyree Barnes were on the Reserve/Military list and did not count against the limit.

New England Patriots 2009 opening training camp roster
Quarterbacks: 12 Tom Brady; 7 Matt Gutierrez; 8 Brian Hoyer ^{UR}; 5 Kevin O'Connell; Running backs: 33 Kevin Faulk PR; 42 BenJarvus Green-Ellis; 39 Laurence Maroney; 34 Sammy Morris; 21 Fred Taylor; Wide receivers: 88 Sam Aiken; 11 Julian Edelman ^{R}; 13 Joey Galloway; 17 Greg Lewis; 81 Randy Moss; 10 Terrence Nunn ^{UR}; 18 Matthew Slater; 83 Wes Welker; 16 Shun White ^{UR}; Tight ends: 87 Chris Baker; 85 Tyson DeVree; 80 Alex Smith; 86 David Thomas; 84 Benjamin Watson	Offensive linemen: 65 Wesley Britt T; 66 George Bussey G ^{R}; 63 Dan Connolly G; 71 Russ Hochstein C; 60 Al Johnson C; 77 Nick Kaczur T; 67 Dan Koppen C; 72 Matt Light T; 70 Logan Mankins G; 61 Stephen Neal G; 68 Ryan O'Callaghan T; 76 Sebastian Vollmer T ^{R}; 69 Ryan Wendell C; 74 Billy Yates G/C; Defensive linemen: 62 Titus Adams NT; 92 Ron Brace NT ^{R}; 97 Jarvis Green DE; 91 Myron Pryor NT ^{R}; 93 Richard Seymour DE; 90 Le Kevin Smith DE; 75 Vince Wilfork NT; 76 Steve Williams DE; 99 Mike Wright DE	Linebackers: 52 Eric Alexander OLB; 95 Tully Banta-Cain OLB; 54 Tedy Bruschi ILB; 50 Vinny Ciurciu ILB; 59 Gary Guyton OLB; 46 Paris Lenon OLB; 51 Jerod Mayo ILB; 49 Vince Redd OLB; 96 Adalius Thomas OLB; 58 Pierre Woods OLB; Defensive backs: 23 Leigh Bodden CB; 28 Darius Butler CB ^{R}; 25 Patrick Chung SS ^{R}; 27 Herana-Daze Jones FS; 30 Brandon McGowan FS; 31 Brandon Meriweather SS; 35 Mike Richardson CB; 36 James Sanders FS; 41 Ray Ventrone FS; 22 Terrence Wheatley CB; 24 Jonathan Wilhite CB; 26 Tank Williams SS; Special teams: 3 Stephen Gostkowski K; 6 Chris Hanson P; 48 Nathan Hodel LS; 47 Jake Ingram LS ^{R}; 1 Tom Malone P	Reserve lists: 15 Tyree Barnes WR (Military) ^{UR}; 98 Shawn Crable OLB (active/PUP); 44 Eric Kettani FB (Military) ^{UR}; 64 Mark LeVoir OT (active/PUP); 62 Rich Ohrnberger G (active/PUP) ^{R}; 91 Jermail Porter OT (Waived/Injured) ^{UR}; 69 Darryl Richard DE (active/PUP) ^{R}; 29 Shawn Springs CB (active/NF-Inj.); 19 Brandon Tate WR (active/NF-Inj.) ^{R}; 94 Ty Warren DE (active/PUP); Unsigned draft picks: 53 Tyrone McKenzie ILB ^{R}; Notations: R: 2009 rookie; UR: 2009 undrafted rookie; Italicized players are not on the 80-man roster.

== Schedule ==
=== Preseason ===
Week	Date	Opponent	Result	Record	Venue	Recap
1	August 13	at Philadelphia Eagles	W 27–25	1–0	Lincoln Financial Field	Recap
2	August 20	Cincinnati Bengals	L 6–7	1–1	Gillette Stadium	Recap
3	August 28	at Washington Redskins	W 27–24	2–1	FedExField	Recap
4	September 3	New York Giants	W 38–27	3–1	Gillette Stadium	Recap

=== Regular season ===
Week	Date	Opponent	Result	Record	Venue	Recap
1	September 14	Buffalo Bills (Note: These four games were among the 16 that the NFL designated as "AFL Legacy Games" in honor of the 50th anniversary of the American Football League. The Patriots wore their throwback uniforms during those four games, as did the Bills, Broncos, and Titans (originally the Houston Oilers). The Dolphins, not one of the original AFL teams, having joined the league only in 1966, wore their standard uniforms.)	W 25–24	1–0	Gillette Stadium	Recap
2	September 20	at New York Jets	L 9–16	1–1	Giants Stadium	Recap
3	September 27	Atlanta Falcons	W 26–10	2–1	Gillette Stadium	Recap
4	October 4	Baltimore Ravens	W 27–21	3–1	Gillette Stadium	Recap
5	October 11	at Denver Broncos	L 17–20 (OT)	3–2	Invesco Field at Mile High	Recap
6	October 18	Tennessee Titans	W 59–0	4–2	Gillette Stadium	Recap
7	October 25	at Tampa Bay Buccaneers	W 35–7	5–2	(United Kingdom) Wembley Stadium (London)	Recap
8	Bye					
9	November 8	Miami Dolphins	W 27–17	6–2	Gillette Stadium	Recap
10	November 15	at Indianapolis Colts	L 34–35	6–3	Lucas Oil Stadium	Recap
11	November 22	New York Jets	W 31–14	7–3	Gillette Stadium	Recap
12	November 30	at New Orleans Saints	L 17–38	7–4	Louisiana Superdome	Recap
13	December 6	at Miami Dolphins	L 21–22	7–5	Land Shark Stadium	Recap
14	December 13	Carolina Panthers	W 20–10	8–5	Gillette Stadium	Recap
15	December 20	at Buffalo Bills	W 17–10	9–5	Ralph Wilson Stadium	Recap
16	December 27	Jacksonville Jaguars	W 35–7	10–5	Gillette Stadium	Recap
17	January 3	at Houston Texans	L 27–34	10–6	Reliant Stadium	Recap

=== Postseason ===
Round	Date	Opponent (seed)	Result	Record	Venue	Recap
Wild Card	January 10, 2010	Baltimore Ravens (6)	L 14–33	0–1	Gillette Stadium	Recap

== Week 1 roster ==
New England Patriots 2009 Week 1 roster
Quarterbacks: 12 Tom Brady; 8 Brian Hoyer ^{UR}; Running backs: 33 Kevin Faulk; 42 BenJarvus Green-Ellis; 39 Laurence Maroney KR; 34 Sammy Morris; 21 Fred Taylor; Wide receivers: 88 Sam Aiken; 11 Julian Edelman ^{R}; 13 Joey Galloway; 81 Randy Moss; 18 Matthew Slater; 83 Wes Welker PR; Tight ends: 86 Chris Baker; 80 Michael Matthews; 84 Benjamin Watson	Offensive linemen: 63 Dan Connolly G; 77 Nick Kaczur T; 67 Dan Koppen C; 72 Matt Light T; 70 Logan Mankins G; 61 Stephen Neal G; 60 Rich Ohrnberger G ^{R}; 71 Kendall Simmons G; 76 Sebastian Vollmer T ^{R}; 69 Ryan Wendell C; Defensive linemen: 92 Ron Brace NT ^{R}; 97 Jarvis Green DE; 91 Myron Pryor NT ^{R}; 94 Ty Warren DE; 75 Vince Wilfork NT; 99 Mike Wright DE	Linebackers: 52 Eric Alexander ILB; 95 Tully Banta-Cain OLB; 55 Derrick Burgess OLB; 59 Gary Guyton OLB; 51 Jerod Mayo ILB; 50 Rob Ninkovich OLB; 96 Adalius Thomas OLB; 58 Pierre Woods OLB; Defensive backs: 23 Leigh Bodden CB; 28 Darius Butler CB ^{R}; 25 Patrick Chung SS ^{R}; 38 Bret Lockett SS ^{UR}; 30 Brandon McGowan FS; 31 Brandon Meriweather SS; 36 James Sanders FS; 29 Shawn Springs CB; 22 Terrence Wheatley CB; 24 Jonathan Wilhite CB; Special teams: 3 Stephen Gostkowski K; 6 Chris Hanson P; 47 Jake Ingram LS ^{R}	Reserve lists: 15 Tyree Barnes WR (Military) ^{UR}; 66 George Bussey T (IR) ^{R}; 98 Shawn Crable OLB (IR); 44 Eric Kettani FB (Military) ^{UR}; 64 Mark LeVoir OT (PUP); 53 Tyrone McKenzie ILB (IR) ^{R}; 19 Brandon Tate WR (NF-Inj.) ^{R}; 35 Chris Taylor RB (IR); 16 Shun White WR (Military) ^{UR}; Practice Squad: 62 Titus Adams DE; 85 Robbie Agnone TE ^{UR}; 68 Patrick Brown OT ^{UR}; 65 Adrian Grady NT ^{UR}; 10 Terrence Nunn WR ^{UR}; 90 Darryl Richard DE ^{R}; 9 Isaiah Stanback WR; 27 DeAngelo Willingham CB ^{UR}; Notations: R: 2009 rookie; UR: 2009 undrafted rookie; Italicized players are not on the 53-man roster.

== Regular season results ==
=== Week 1: vs. Buffalo Bills ===
Quarter	1	2	3	4	Total
Bills	7	7	3	7	24
Patriots	0	10	0	15	25

at Gillette Stadium, Foxborough, Massachusetts

- Game time: 7:00 pm EDT
- Game weather: 70 °F (21 °C), clear and warm
- Game attendance: 68,756
- Referee: Scott Green
- TV announcers (ESPN^{[a]}): Mike Tirico (play-by-play), Ron Jaworski and Jon Gruden (color commentators), and Suzy Kolber (sideline reporter)

In the first game of an ESPN Monday Night Football opening doubleheader, the Patriots faced the Bills at home in an American Football League "legacy game" honoring the 50th anniversary of the founding of AFL, which added ten teams to the NFL as part of the 1970 AFL–NFL merger. As two of the eight founding teams of the AFL, the Bills and Patriots celebrated their 50th anniversaries by wearing throwback uniforms from the AFL era, while the officials also wore red-striped uniforms such as those worn by AFL officials. Following a Patriots three-and-out to open the game, the Bills punted to give the Patriots the ball at their own 17-yard line. Nine players later, the Patriots were unable to convert on third down, setting kicker Stephen Gostkowski up for a 41-yard field goal try. He missed it wide right, giving the Bills the ball at their own 32-yard line. Bills quarterback Trent Edwards scrambled for 16 yards to move the Bills into Patriots territory before a Fred Jackson run gained another 16 yards. Jackson was filling in for suspended starter Marshawn Lynch; Patriots linebacker and 2008 Defensive Rookie of the Year Jerod Mayo suffered a sprained MCL on the play and did not return. The next play, a dump-off pass to Jackson, gained 21 yards and put the Bills in the red zone. Two plays later, Edwards hit rookie tight end Shawn Nelson for an 11-yard touchdown, giving the Bills a 7–0 lead. The Patriots next drive was a three-and-out, ending on an Aaron Schobel sack of quarterback Tom Brady on third down.

The Bills punted back to the Patriots early in the second quarter, setting the table for a 14-play, 72-yard Patriots drive that culminated on a 1-yard touchdown run by running back Fred Taylor to tie the game. Despite a 16-yard dump-off to Jackson on the Bills' next drive, they punted back to the Patriots before reaching midfield. On the very next play, a Brady pass intended for running back Sammy Morris was intercepted by Schobel and returned 26 yards for a touchdown, giving the Bills a 14–7 lead. Brady was more accurate on his next possession, throwing passes of 14 yards to tight end Benjamin Watson and wide receiver Wes Welker to move into Bills territory, and then hitting wide receiver Randy Moss on a 31-yard strike within the two-minute warning. The drive stalled in the Bills' red zone, and the Patriots were forced to settle for a 20-yard Gostkowski field goal as the first half expired, cutting the Bills' lead to 14–10.

Aided by more Jackson yardage and a 15-yard roughing the passer penalty on Vince Wilfork, the Bills moved close to midfield on the opening drive of the second half before punting and pinning the Patriots at their own 3-yard line. The Patriots would advance to the Bills' 36-yard line on 12 plays, but an incomplete pass on third down set up a fourth down conversion try, which failed on another incomplete pass. Three plays later, Edwards hit new target Terrell Owens for the first time in the game, good for 27 yards to put the Bills in Patriots territory. However, a run for a loss and a Tully Banta-Cain sack of Edwards set up a 3rd-and-20 situation, where the Bills failed to convert, forcing a 40-yard Rian Lindell field goal. After a punt, the Patriots began an 11-play drive that spanned into the fourth quarter, ending it on a 28-yard Gostkowski field goal that cut the Bills' lead to 17–13. The Bills responded by embarking on a 14-play, 62-yard drive that took more than six minutes off the clock and extended the Bills' lead to 24–13 on a 10-yard Jackson touchdown on a dump-off from Edwards. With 5:25 remaining in the game and down by 11 points, the Patriots shifted into their two-minute, pass-only offense, moving the ball 81 yards on 11 plays in 3:26 and scoring on an 18-yard Watson touchdown pass from Brady. The Patriots' two-point conversion try failed, keeping them within five points of the Bills.

On the ensuing kickoff, Bills second-year returner Leodis McKelvin chose to return the kickoff out of the end zone, despite having his team's onside kick return unit on the field. Safety Brandon Meriweather hit McKelvin at the Bills' 31-yard line, which allowed linebacker Pierre Woods to come in from the side and strip McKelvin of the ball. Gostkowski recovered it at the same spot. Following the two-minute warning, the Patriots offense came back out onto the field. On the third play of the drive, Brady hit Watson on a nearly identical end zone route for a 16-yard touchdown, which was upheld by official review. The Patriots two-point attempt failed again, holding their lead to one point over the Bills. With 45 seconds remaining, the Bills began their next drive and were able to reach their own 40-yard line before another Banta-Cain sack pushed them back to the 30-yard line. The next play was a last-minute desperation multiple-lateral play that fell short for the Bills, giving the Patriots a 25–24 win, their first victory of the season.

=== Week 2: at New York Jets ===
Quarter	1	2	3	4	Total
Patriots	3	6	0	0	9
Jets	0	3	10	3	16

at Giants Stadium, East Rutherford, New Jersey

- Game time: 1:00 pm EDT
- Game weather: 69 °F (21 °C), clear
- Game attendance: 78,312
- Referee: John Parry
- TV announcers (CBS): Greg Gumbel (play-by-play) and Dan Dierdorf (color commentator)

Following their close home win over the Bills, the Patriots traveled to face the Jets in the final regular season matchup between the teams in Giants Stadium. In the week prior to the game, first-year Jets head coach Rex Ryan placed a phone message to all Jets season ticket holders asking them to "make it miserable for (Tom) Brady and company," following up on his comments during the offseason that he would not "kiss Bill Belichick's Super Bowl rings." He told the Jets fans that "the Patriots had a better head coach and a better quarterback," but that the game would decide "who has a better team." Meanwhile, Jets safety Kerry Rhodes said the Jets intended on not just winning, but "embarrassing" the Patriots in the game, while nose tackle Kris Jenkins called it the Jets' version of the Super Bowl; the Jets had not defeated the Patriots at home since 2000. On the first drive of the game, without an injured Welker, the Patriots drove to the Jets' 36-yard line before having to punt. The Jets' first play from scrimmage was a strip-sack of rookie quarterback Mark Sanchez by defensive lineman Mike Wright; Sanchez recovered the fumble at the Jets' 3-yard line. On 4th-and-24, the Jets punted back to their own 49-yard line; the Patriots could not capitalize on the field position and went three-and-out. However, Jets running back Leon Washington fumbled on the next play; cornerback Leigh Bodden recovered it at the Jets' 17-yard line. Two holding penalties would push the Patriots back to the Jets' 37-yard line, setting up a 45-yard Gostkowski field goal to give the Patriots a 3–0 lead. Following a Jets three-and-out, the Patriots moved to their own 41-yard line before Jets cornerback Darrelle Revis intercepted a pass intended for Moss at the Jets' 16-yard line. The Jets offense would continue to struggle, however, going three-and-out again to end the first quarter.

The Patriots began the second quarter with a 9-play, 53-yard drive, one that stalled at the Jets' 7-yard line; the Patriots settled for another Gostkowski field goal, extending their lead to 6–0. The Jets would pick up their initial first down of the game on their next possession, going 52 yards on 10 plays before a Jay Feely 33-yard field goal cut the Patriots' lead in half. Starting from their own 10-yard line after a holding penalty on Sam Aiken on the kickoff, the Patriots took nearly six minutes off the clock, reaching the Jets' 11-yard line before two incomplete passes by Brady prevented the Patriots scoring their first touchdown of the game. Instead, Gostkowski kicked his third field goal of the day to increase the Patriots' lead to 9–3 going into halftime. Receiving the opening kickoff of the second half due to their deferral of the opening coin toss, the Jets took the lead in barely a minute. Following a 43-yard kick return by Washington, Sanchez hit wide receiver Jerricho Cotchery for 45 yards and a play later connected with tight end Dustin Keller on a 9-yard touchdown pass. The 10–9 lead was the first for the Jets over the Patriots at home since 2001. After a Patriots three-and-out, punter Chris Hanson's 30-yard punt gave the Jets the ball at the Patriots' 45-yard line. From the Patriots' 6-yard line, Sanchez appeared to throw a touchdown pass to Chansi Stuckey, but the catch was overturned after the Patriots challenged. Two plays later, Feely hit his second field goal of the day to give the Jets a 13–9 lead.

The Patriots' ensuing possession reached the Jets' 35-yard line on a third down, but back-to-back delay of game penalties on Brady, an incomplete pass, and a facemask penalty on Moss on the punt backed the Patriots up to their own 40-yard line. However, Hanson's subsequent attempt was better than the first, nullified by the penalty, and the Jets began their next drive from their own 15-yard line. On a 14-play, 63-yard drive that spanned into the fourth quarter, the Jets extended their lead to 16–9 on a 39-yard Feely field goal. The Patriots started their next drive from their own 15-yard line as well, but were unable to reach midfield before punting. A Jets three-and-out gave the Patriots another opportunity with five minutes remaining, but a Watson holding penalty in the middle of the drive helped set up a 2nd-and-20 situation and eventually another punt. Just before the two-minute warning, Sanchez was sacked, but a penalty on BenJarvus Green-Ellis on the ensuing punt meant the Patriots had to start their last drive of the game from their own 10-yard line. After a Julian Edelman 18-yard reception began it, four straight incompletions ended the drive and the game. The loss dropped the Patriots to 1–1, their first such record since the 2005 season. It also marked the first time that New England was held without a touchdown since December 10, 2006.

=== Week 3: vs. Atlanta Falcons ===
Quarter	1	2	3	4	Total
Falcons	3	7	0	0	10
Patriots	3	10	3	10	26

at Gillette Stadium, Foxborough, Massachusetts

- Game time: 1:00 pm EDT
- Game weather: 62 °F (17 °C), rain
- Game attendance: 68,756
- Referee: Alberto Riveron
- TV announcers (Fox): Joe Buck (play-by-play), Troy Aikman (color commentator), and Pam Oliver (sideline reporter)

Looking to avoid back-to-back losses, the Patriots returned home to face the Atlanta Falcons, missing Welker for the second straight game. The Falcons moved the ball 72 yards on their 12-play opening drive, but settled for a 26-yard Jason Elam field goal after being stopped on 3rd-and-3 from the 8-yard line. The Patriots responded with a 15-play drive of their own, beginning with a 19-yard dump-off pass to Morris. No other play on the drive would go for more than 9 yards, and the Patriots themselves were stopped short of a touchdown, with wide receiver Joey Galloway catching a pass with his foot out of bounds in the back of the end zone on what would have been a 7-yard touchdown pass. Instead, the Patriots could not reach further than the Falcons' 2-yard line and settled for a 21-yard Gostkowski field goal to tie the game. The Falcons next drive was a three-and-out that began the second quarter, with a 29-yard Michael Koenen punt and a 5-yard penalty on the Falcons giving the Patriots the ball at their own 49-yard line. After two pass attempts, Taylor had runs of 8, 19, 6, and 8 yards, with the final rush good for a touchdown and a 10–7 Patriots lead. Beginning their next drive from their own 41-yard line after a 33-yard return by Eric Weems, the Falcons moved into Patriots territory on one play before an apparent strip-sack of second-quarter quarterback Matt Ryan by safety Brandon McGowan; the Falcons challenged the ruling (which included a touchdown return by cornerback Shawn Springs) and won, as Ryan's arm was going forward when he lost the ball. Another Jenkins reception, this one for 21 yards, moved the Falcons deeper into Patriots territory before running back Michael Turner ran for a 2-yard touchdown that tied the game. Following a Patriots three-and-out, the Falcons again moved into Patriots territory, but a Turner fumble at the Patriots' 27-yard line, forced by McGowan, was recovered by safety James Sanders with just under four minutes remaining in the half. The Patriots' 12-play drive brought them into the red zone, but a dropped pass by Galloway just outside the end zone and an incompletion to wide receiver Sam Aiken in the end zone forced a 33-yard Gostkowski field goal that gave the Patriots a 13–10 lead going into halftime.

The Patriots began where they left off at the start of the second half, embarking on a 13-play drive that entered into the red zone on a 23-yard Watson catch. However, the Patriots' offense stalled in the red zone again, with two incomplete passes to Moss setting up a 22-yard Gostkowski field goal. Ryan and Jenkins continued to connect on the Falcons' ensuing drive; a 26-yard reception put the Falcons in Patriots territory and then a 36-yard touchdown pass was nullified on a pass interference penalty on Jenkins. With a subsequent false start penalty, the Falcons were pushed back into Patriots' territory and eventually forced to punt. The Patriots' next drive spanned 70 yards on 16 plays and was kept alive on a 4th-and-1 conversion from the Patriots' own 24-yard line. Again, it did not involve a touchdown though, as Gostkowski kicked a 33-yard field goal to extend the Patriots' lead to 19–10 early in the fourth quarter. After an exchange of three punts, the Patriots began a 6-play drive that resulted in their first passing touchdown of the day, a 36-yard reception by tight end Chris Baker that extended the Patriots' lead to 26–10; it was also Brady's 200th career touchdown pass. After a Falcons three-and-out, the Patriots held the ball for the final 6:52 of the game to seal a 26–10 victory. The win was the Pats third over the Falcons since 2001 and it improved them to 2-1.

=== Week 4: vs. Baltimore Ravens ===
Quarter	1	2	3	4	Total
Ravens	7	0	7	7	21
Patriots	3	14	7	3	27

at Gillette Stadium, Foxborough, Massachusetts

- Game time: 1:00 pm EDT
- Game weather: 64 °F (18 °C), cloudy
- Game attendance: 68,756
- Referee: Ron Winter
- TV announcers (CBS): Jim Nantz (play-by-play) and Phil Simms (color commentator)

Coming off their win over the Falcons, the Patriots stayed at home for a Week 4 matchup against the Baltimore Ravens. The opening kickoff was fumbled by Ravens returner Chris Carr and recovered by McGowan at the Ravens' 12-yard line. However, the Patriots could not capitalize on the field position, settling for a 32-yard Gostkowski field goal to give them an early 3–0 lead. The Ravens began their first drive from their own 19-yard line and advanced on a 15-play drive, capping it with a 20-yard touchdown pass from quarterback Joe Flacco to wide receiver Derrick Mason. The Patriots responded with a 14-play drive of their own, going 76 yards before Brady scored on a 1-yard quarterback sneak to re-establish a Patriots lead at 10–7. The Ravens reached midfield on their next drive with a 22-yard reception by tight end Todd Heap, but the drive stalled at the Patriots' 38-yard line, setting up a punt by Sam Koch that gave the Patriots the ball at their own 9-yard line. Similarly, the Patriots reached Ravens' territory before having to punt; Hanson's punt landed in the end zone for a touchback. On the second play of the Ravens' ensuing drive, left tackle Jared Gaither injured his head falling into Flacco during a block; while he had motion in his extremities, the game was stopped for 15 minutes as Gaither was loaded onto a stretcher and taken to the hospital for tests. The Ravens' drive finished as a three-and-out. The Patriots then went 63 yards on six plays, extending their lead to 17–7 on a 12-yard touchdown run by Morris. With just under four minutes remaining in the half, the Ravens mounted a drive that reached the Patriots' 17-yard line with 1:17 left; Flacco was intercepted by Bodden to prevent the Ravens from scoring again before halftime.

The Patriots first drive of the second half was aided by a 15-yard unsportsmanlike penalty on the Ravens' bench, but the Patriots were unable to capitalize as a Matt Light holding penalty and a Jarret Johnson sack of Brady forced a punt. Starting from their own 16-yard line, the Ravens advanced to their 45-yard line before a Wright sack of Flacco set up another punt. Kevin Faulk fielded the return but fumbled; Bodden recovered the fumble for the Patriots at their own 14-yard line. On the next play, Brady dropped back and was strip-sacked from his blind side by Terrell Suggs; defensive lineman Dwan Edwards recovered the fumble for the Ravens in the end zone for a touchdown, cutting the Patriots' lead to 17–14. Brady quickly recovered, hitting passes to Taylor for 13 yards, Aiken for 26 yards, and Moss for 20 yards to put the Patriots in the Ravens' red zone. Three plays later, Brady and Moss connected for their first touchdown of the season; the 14-yard strike extended the Patriots' lead to 24–14. The Ravens had similar success on his next drive, with Flacco hitting Mark Clayton on a 13-yard catch, Mason on a 20-yard catch, and then running back Ray Rice breaking a 50-yard rush to put the Ravens well into Patriots territory. A few plays later, Flacco kept pace with Brady on a 13-yard touchdown pass to running back Willis McGahee to cut the Patriots' lead to 24–21. The Patriots would control the ball for the next seven minutes, reaching the Ravens' 9-yard line on a second down. After two incomplete passes, the Patriots lined up in a field goal formation but the holder, Hanson, took a quick snap and passed to Baker, who had motioned outside of the formation. Baker was tackled around the first down marker, but was called for an illegal motion on the play. The Ravens challenged the ruling of a catch and the first down spot, as they would have declined the penalty if Baker had been short. The ruling was upheld and the Patriots took a 27–21 lead on a 33-yard Gostkowski field goal. After an exchange of three-and-outs, the Ravens mounted a drive with 3:32 left, reaching the Patriots' red zone with under a minute remaining. On third and fourth down, Flacco's passes fell incomplete to Mason and Clayton, ending the Ravens' hopes of a comeback. Brady then kneeled to hand the Ravens their first loss of the season and better the Patriots' record to 3–1.

=== Week 5: at Denver Broncos ===
Quarter	1	2	3	4	OT	Total
Patriots	10	7	0	0	0	17
Broncos	0	7	3	7	3	20

at Invesco Field at Mile High, Denver, Colorado

- Game time: 4:15 pm EDT/2:15 pm MDT
- Game weather: 30 °F (−1 °C), cloudy
- Game attendance: 76,011
- Referee: Carl Cheffers
- TV announcers (CBS): Jim Nantz (play-by-play) and Phil Simms (color commentator)

In the coldest game ever in the history of the NFL this early on in the regular season, the Patriots traveled to Denver to face a fourth straight undefeated team, a stretch only matched by one other post-merger team (Note: the 1986 Philadelphia Eagles). The game also marked the first time former Patriots assistant Josh McDaniels, who became the head coach of the Broncos in 2009, faced his former team. On the first drive of the game, the Broncos advanced to the Patriots' 30-yard line before Matt Prater attempted a 48-yard field goal; he missed wide right. With field position at their own 38-yard line, the Patriots moved into the red zone on a 35-yard dump-off to Morris. Three plays later, Brady and Welker connected on their first touchdown pass of the season; the 8-yard score gave the Patriots a 7–0 lead. Three plays later, Mayo, in his first game back from his knee injury, forced a fumble of Broncos running back Knowshon Moreno; McGowan recovered it at the Broncos' 43-yard line. After a 10-yard Morris run began the Patriots' ensuing possession, they lost two yards over their next three plays, setting up a 53-yard Gostkowski field goal (a career long) that extended the Patriots' lead to 10–0. Following a Broncos three-and-out, the Patriots had a three-and-out of their own; the punt was fumbled by returner Eddie Royal but recovered by Broncos cornerback Jack Williams and returned to the Broncos' 38-yard line. The Broncos then advanced into Patriots territory but were forced to punt again. This set up a Patriots drive that moved to the Broncos' 41-yard line before a failed third down conversion and an unnecessary roughness penalty on guard Logan Mankins pushed the Patriots back past midfield and forced a punt. Despite starting from their own 10-yard line with a sack, the Broncos quickly advanced into Patriots territory on Kyle Orton completions of 11, 10, and 13 yards plus a roughing the passer penalty on Ty Warren. More Orton completions resulted in an 11-yard touchdown pass to Brandon Marshall that cut the Patriots' lead to 10–7. With under five minutes remaining in the half, the Patriots mounted a 10-play, 74-yard drive, capping it off with a 7-yard touchdown pass to Watson, giving the Patriots a 17–7 lead going into halftime after Moss' first career interception on a last-second hail mary pass from Orton.

The Patriots began the second half with a three-and-out; the Broncos then moved 66 yards on 12 plays before their drive stalled at the Patriots' 6-yard line and Prater kicked a 24-yard field goal to cut the Patriots' lead to 17–10. Two plays later, Brady connected with Moss on a 36-yard pass, but the Patriots were unable to get past the Broncos' 22-yard line and there, Goskowski missed a 40-yard field goal. Following a Broncos punt, the Patriots mounted a 12-play drive that spanned into the fourth quarter; however, the drive began from the Patriots' 4-yard line and only reached the Broncos' 47-yard line, resulting in another punt. The Broncos' ensuing possession began from worse field position (the Broncos' 2-yard line) but 10 of its 12 plays were Orton passes, the last of which was another 11-yard Marshall touchdown catch that tied the game. Following two three-and-outs, the Patriots had the ball again at their own 30-yard line. The final play before the two-minute warning was a 19-yard Morris run to bring the Patriots close to midfield. Morris fumbled on his next run but tackle Nick Kaczur recovered it at the Broncos' 49-yard line. On the next play, Brady was strip-sacked by defensive lineman Vonnie Holliday; Broncos linebacker Elvis Dumervil recovered the fumble at the Patriots' 45-yard line with 1:37 remaining. However, the Broncos were forced to punt after a Banta-Cain sack and Brady kneeled to send the game into overtime.

The Patriots lost the overtime coin toss, and Gostkowski kicked off into the back of the end zone to spot the ball at the Broncos' 20-yard line. On an 11-play, 58-yard drive, the Broncos advanced to the Patriots' 22-yard line. Prater then kicked the game-winning field goal from 41 yards out to give the Broncos another win, bettering their record to 5–0 and dropping the Patriots to 3–2.

=== Week 6: vs. Tennessee Titans ===
Quarter	1	2	3	4	Total
Titans	0	0	0	0	0
Patriots	10	35	14	0	59

at Gillette Stadium, Foxborough, Massachusetts

- Game time: 4:15 pm EDT
- Game weather: 39 °F (4 °C), mixed rain and snow, windy
- Game attendance: 68,756
- Referee: Gene Steratore
- TV announcers (CBS): Jim Nantz (play-by-play) and Phil Simms (color commentator)

For the first time in 2009, the Patriots played a team with a loss on their record; the 0–5 Titans traveled to Foxborough to face the Patriots for an AFL Legacy game in an early season snowstorm. The Titans gained one yard on their first possession and went three-and-out; Edelman returned the 35-yard punt 35 yards to give the Patriots the ball at the Titans' 29-yard line. However, a third down sack by Kyle Vanden Bosch forced the Patriots to attempt a field goal, a 39-yarder that fell wide right. Following a Titans punt, the Patriots advanced past midfield before a 45-yard touchdown run by Maroney that gave the Patriots a 7–0 lead. After a Titans three-and-out, the Patriots moved into the red zone on a 48-yard pass from Brady to Welker, and then took a 10–0 lead on a 33-yard Gostkowski field goal. On the ensuing Titans possession, early in the second quarter, running back LenDale White fumbled at the Patriots' 41-yard line; it was recovered at the 35-yard line by cornerback Jonathan Wilhite. After crossing midfield, Brady connected with Moss on a 40-yard touchdown pass, extending the Patriots' lead to 17–0. On the next play from scrimmage, Titans quarterback Kerry Collins fumbled the snap; it was recovered by the Patriots' Wright at the Titans' 31-yard line. Two plays later, Moss caught a 28-yard touchdown pass from Brady, making the score 24–0. Three plays into the Titans' ensuing possession, Collins was intercepted by rookie cornerback Darius Butler at the Patriots' 35-yard line. Four plays later, Brady hit Faulk on a dump-off pass that went 38 yards for a touchdown. After a Titans three-and-out that ended in a 41-yard Reggie Hodges punt to the New England 21-yard line, Brady capped a 76-yard drive with a 30-yard touchdown pass to Welker immediately after the two-minute warning, giving the Patriots a 38–0 lead. The Titans went three-and-out again, but Hodges shanked the punt, which traveled only 21 yards. The subsequent 10-play, 49-yard drive ended in Welker's second touchdown, a 5-yard reception.

This gave the Patriots a 45–0 halftime lead, the largest in NFL history. It was also Brady's fifth touchdown pass of the quarter, an NFL record. The 45 points scored in the half were a team record, as were the 35 points scored in the second quarter. Brady's 345 passing yards and five touchdowns in the half were also team records.

Due to their deferral of the opening coin toss, the Patriots began the second half with possession. They advanced 65 yards on nine plays, with Brady throwing his sixth and final touchdown pass of the day to Moss, from 9 yards out. The six touchdowns tied a team record set by Brady in November 2007. The Titans moved into Patriots territory on a 48-yard run by Chris Johnson, but attempted to convert a 4th-and-10 from the Patriots' 17-yard line. On the play, Collins was chased 15 yards into his own backfield by rookie defensive tackle Myron Pryor; Collins managed to complete a pass to receiver Nate Washington—one of just two the Titans completed all game—who fumbled and recovered it another seven yards deep. As a result of this pass that officially lost 22 yards, the Patriots allowed a team record −7 gross passing yards on the game.

Undrafted rookie Brian Hoyer replaced Brady at quarterback and led a 12-play, 61-yard drive, ending in a 1-yard touchdown run by Hoyer to give the Patriots a 59–0 lead. Gostkowski's included extra point was his eighth of the game, tying his team record set in November 2007. The 59 points also set a Patriots team record, and the eight touchdowns tied another. Vince Young replaced Collins at quarterback for the fourth quarter, but had his first pass intercepted by rookie safety Pat Chung. The Patriots attempted on a fourth down conversion in the Titans' red zone on their ensuing possession but it failed. The Titans then advanced into Patriots territory before fullback Ahmard Hall fumbled; it was recovered by 40-year-old linebacker Junior Seau, who returned to the team in the days prior to the game. The Patriots' next play was a 5-yard run by Green-Ellis which gave the Patriots 599 total yards on the day, breaking the previous team record of 597 set in 1979. They would finish with 619 net yards; 426 of those were passing, tying a team record. Following a Titans punt, the Patriots and Titans kneeled to end the game at 59–0, improving the Patriots' record to 4–2 and keeping the Titans winless at 0–6. The 59–0 shutout tied the largest post-merger shutout and margin of victory with a 59–0 win by the Los Angeles Rams over the Atlanta Falcons in 1976.

=== Week 7: at Tampa Bay Buccaneers ===
Quarter	1	2	3	4	Total
Patriots	14	7	7	7	35
Buccaneers	0	7	0	0	7

at Wembley Stadium, London, England

- Game time: 1:00 pm EDT/5:00 pm GMT
- Game weather: 59 °F (15 °C), partly cloudy
- Game attendance: 84,254
- Referee: Jerome Boger
- TV announcers (CBS): Jim Nantz (play-by-play) and Phil Simms (color commentator)

Following their home win over the Titans, the Patriots flew to Wembley Stadium in London for the year's NFL International Series game against the winless Tampa Bay Buccaneers. Five plays into the game, Buccaneers quarterback Josh Johnson was intercepted by Meriweather, who returned it 39 yards for a touchdown. On the ensuing drive, the Buccaneers advanced to the Patriots' 33-yard line before Meriweather again intercepted a Johnson pass, this time at the Patriots' 15-yard line; he returned this one 31 yards. However, the Patriots could not capitalize on the turnover and went three-and-out. Following a Buccaneers punt, the Patriots began a drive with an end-around to rookie wide receiver Brandon Tate, who was active for his first NFL game after spending the first six weeks of the season on the Physically Unable to Perform list; the run went for 11 yards. Two plays later, Brady connected with Moss on a 37-yard pass, which was followed a few plays later with a 14-yard Welker touchdown reception that gave the Patriots a 14–0 lead. After a penalty on the kickoff, the Buccaneers began their next drive at their own 11-yard line and could not advance one yard before punting; the 43-yard punt was returned by Welker 24 yards. Starting from the Buccaneers' 30-yard line, the Patriots moved to the 11-yard line before Brady was intercepted by safety Tanard Jackson in the end zone early in the second quarter.

Following a Buccaneers three-and-out, Brady threw a short pass to Aiken that turned into a 54-yard scoring strike, extending the Patriots lead to 21–0. After another Buccaneers punt, Brady was intercepted by Aqib Talib on a deep pass intended for Brandon Tate; Talib returned it to the Buccaneers' 41-yard line. The 0–6 Buccaneers could not cross midfield though, and were forced into another three-and-out. On a 4th-and-2 from their own 46-yard line, the Patriots attempted a fake punt that was negated by a false start on Mankins; this set up a 26-yard Hanson punt. With less than three minutes remaining in the half, the Buccaneers drove into Patriots territory and then completed two passes to wide receiver Antonio Bryant; the second went for 33 yards and a touchdown, cutting the Patriots' lead to 21–7. The Patriots could not advance the ball on their ensuing drive and punted; two plays later, on the final play of the half, Butler intercepted Johnson at the Patriots' 11-yard line.

The Patriots began the second half with a 10-play, 73-yard drive that was capped off with a 35-yard touchdown pass to Watson from Brady. After an exchange of punts, the Buccaneers embarked on a drive that extended into Patriots territory but stalled at the 37-yard line, resulting in a punt. This was followed by two more three-and-outs, before early in the fourth quarter the Patriots completed a 10-play, 89-yard drive with a 1-yard Maroney touchdown run, increasing the Patriots' lead to 35–7. After another Buccaneers punt, the Patriots advanced past midfield before punting after the two-minute warning. On an ensuing 4th-and-7 conversion attempt, Johnson was strip-sacked by Derrick Burgess to set up two Patriots kneeldowns to end the game. The Patriots bettered their record to 5–2 entering their bye week, while the Buccaneers remained winless at 0–7.

=== Week 9: vs. Miami Dolphins ===
Quarter	1	2	3	4	Total
Dolphins	3	7	7	0	17
Patriots	7	9	8	3	27

at Gillette Stadium, Foxborough, Massachusetts

- Game time: 1:00 pm EST
- Game weather: 65 °F (18 °C), sunny and pleasant
- Game attendance: 68,756
- Referee: Mike Carey
- TV announcers (CBS): Greg Gumbel (play-by-play) and Dan Dierdorf (color commentator)

Coming off their bye week, the Patriots returned home to face the Dolphins for the first time in the season. On the third play of the game, Brady attempted a deep pass to Moss; it was intercepted by rookie cornerback Vontae Davis at the Dolphins' 7-yard line and returned 15 yards. Six plays later, the Dolphins moved into Patriots territory on a 21-yard catch by tight end Joey Haynos from Chad Henne; after the catch, McGowan forced Haynos to fumble, but the ball went out of bounds at the spot of the catch, the Patriots' 39-yard line. On the next play, Henne appeared to have been strip-sacked by Banta-Cain, with linebacker Adalius Thomas returning it 59 yards for a touchdown. However, the Dolphins challenged that Henne's arm was moving forward and it was an incomplete pass and the play was reversed. Three plays later, a Dan Carpenter 52-yard field goal gave the Dolphins a 3–0 lead. The Patriots began their next drive at their own 37-yard line after offensive lineman Dan Connolly returned a short kickoff 16 yards. A few plays later, Brady connected with Moss on a 36-yard pass to the Dolphins' 1-yard line; Maroney then ran for a 1-yard touchdown to give the Patriots a 7–3 lead. On the ensuing possession, Henne found his other tight end, Anthony Fasano on a 20-yard strike to move into Patriots territory, but a "Wildcat" formation run by Ricky Williams for a loss and a sack by Chung moved the Dolphins out of field goal territory and forced a punt. The Patriots advanced to the Dolphins' 42-yard line on their next drive before punting on the final play of the first quarter.

Following a Dolphins three-and-out, the Patriots began an 11-play, 49-yard drive that reached the Dolphins' 11-yard line on first down before a short pass, and incompletion, and sack led to a Gostkowski field goal; the 30-yarder put the Patriots ahead 10–3. The Dolphins introduced rookie quarterback Pat White on their next drive, employing him as part of an option offense that first had White run for a 33-yard gain and later in the drive had White option to Williams for a 15-yard touchdown run, tying the game. Following a 34-yard punt return by Tate, the Patriots quickly moved back into Dolphins territory on completions of 14 yards to Faulk and 23 yards to Watson. However, a Watson pass interference penalty on a 17-yard Faulk reception pushed the Patriots back to the Dolphins' 35-yard line. Gostkowski would later kick a 38-yard field goal to re-establish a Patriots lead at 13–10. On their next drive, the Dolphins would punt shortly after the two-minute warning, setting up a 10-play, 70-yard Patriots drive that ended the half with a 34-yard Gostkowski field goal after Brady was again sacked in the red zone.

With possession and down 16–10 at the start of the third quarter, the Dolphins moved downfield on a 16-play drive that lasted more than ten minutes, eventually scoring on a 1-yard touchdown catch by Haynos from running back Ronnie Brown out of the "Wildcat," giving the Dolphins a 17–16 lead. Three plays later, Brady and Moss connected on a 71-yard touchdown pass and then again on the two-point conversion to re-take the lead at 24–17. The Dolphins would continue to employ both White and the "Wildcat" on their next drive, but it resulted in a Brandon Fields punt early in the fourth quarter. An exchange of punts consumed the next six minutes of the game, with the Dolphins choosing to use all three of their timeouts to gain back possession with 3:38 left. However, three straight incompletions and a penalty set up fourth down, when Henne again was unable to complete a pass from his own 27-yard line. The Patriots re-gained possession and ran the ball three times before Gostkowski kicked a 40-yard field goal to extend the Patriots' lead to 27–17. The game would end four plays later on a 23-yard Greg Camarillo reception to the Patriots' 23-yard line. The win bettered the Patriots record to 6–2 entering their matchup with the 8–0 Colts.

=== Week 10: at Indianapolis Colts ===
Quarter	1	2	3	4	Total
Patriots	7	17	0	10	34
Colts	7	7	0	21	35

at Lucas Oil Stadium, Indianapolis, Indiana

- Game time: 8:20 pm EST
- Game weather: Played with roof closed, retractable roof stadium
- Game attendance: 67,476
- Referee: Scott Green
- TV announcers (NBC): Al Michaels (play-by-play), Cris Collinsworth (color commentator), and Andrea Kremer (sideline reporter)

For the second time in three seasons, the Patriots made a November visit to Indianapolis to face an undefeated Colts team. Both teams went three-and-out on their first possessions, setting up a Colts drive to begin from their own 10-yard line. After two 25-yard passes from Peyton Manning to tight end Dallas Clark and wide receiver Reggie Wayne, the Colts moved deep into Patriots territory. On a 3rd-and-11 from the Patriots' 15-yard line, running back Joseph Addai scored on a pass from Manning, capping the 8-play, 90-yard drive. The Patriots responded with a 55-yard Moss catch from Brady four plays later, setting up a 1-yard Maroney touchdown run to tie the game at 7–7. Following a Colts punt, the Patriots began their ensuing drive with a 29-yard Faulk run to move to the Colts' 42-yard line. Nine plays later, the Patriots found themselves in a 3rd-and-goal from the Colts' 4-yard line, but Brady was sacked by defensive end Robert Mathis. Gostkowski then hit a 31-yard field goal to give the Patriots a 10–7 lead early in the second quarter. After a Colts three-and-out, it took the Patriots two plays and less than a minute to score, with Brady connecting with Moss on a 63-yard touchdown pass, extending the Patriots' lead to 17–7. The Colts faced a 3rd-and-5 on their next drive, but Manning was sacked by Mayo to force another punt. On the next play, Watson caught a 36-yard pass from Brady, setting up a 9-yard touchdown catch by Edelman, the first of the rookie's career, four plays later. Down 24–7, the Colts embarked on an 8-play, 80-yard drive, cutting the Patriots' lead to 24–14 on a 20-yard touchdown reception by Wayne. An exchange of four punts ended the first half.

Due to their deferral of the opening coin toss, the Patriots had possession to begin the second half. They advanced to the Colts' 33-yard line before a Brady pass intended for Moss was intercepted by safety Antoine Bethea at the Colts' 14-yard line and returned 19 yards. However, four plays later, Manning himself was intercepted by Bodden at the Patriots' 24-yard line; an unsportsmanlike conduct penalty on Bodden moved the Patriots back to their own 12-yard line. Despite this field position, the Patriots offense moved deep into Colts territory on a series of Brady passes and Faulk runs, eventually setting up a 2nd-and-2 from the Colts' 2-yard line. On the play, Maroney attempted to push a pile into the end zone, but in the process Colts linebacker Philip Wheeler forced him to fumble; it was recovered by fellow Colts linebacker Gary Brackett in the end zone for a touchback. The Colts could not capitalize on the turnover and were forced to punt. Welker returned the punt 69 yards to the Colts' 7-yard line, the longest Patriots punt return since 2001. Two plays later, on the second play of the fourth quarter, Moss caught his second touchdown pass of the night; the 5-yard reception gave the Patriots a 31–14 lead. However, the Colts offense advanced 79 yards on five plays on their ensuing possession, cutting the Patriots' lead to 31–21 on a 29-yard touchdown catch by Pierre Garçon. The Patriots punted on the next drive, but received the ball right back after Manning was intercepted by Wilhite on the next play, setting up a Patriots drive from the Colts' 31-yard line. The Patriots moved into the red zone but stalled there and were forced to settle for a 36-yard Gostkowski field goal, extending their lead to 34–21 with 4:17 remaining in the game.

On their ensuing possession, the Colts again advanced 79 yards for a touchdown, this time on six plays, the final one being a 4-yard Addai touchdown run, reducing the Patriots' lead to six points with 2:23 left in the game. The Patriots used a timeout before their first play, and in addition to a timeout used early in the third quarter, this left them with one remaining in the game. The Patriots next two plays failed to gain first down yardage, setting up a 4th-and-2 from their own 28-yard line. The Patriots used their final timeout before deciding to attempt to convert the fourth down. On the play, Brady motioned Faulk out of the backfield into the slot out of the shotgun, and then threw a quick pass to Faulk off the snap. Faulk caught the pass with the necessary yardage falling towards the sideline before being hit by safety Melvin Bullitt and pushed back towards the line of scrimmage. However, the officials ruled that Faulk bobbled the pass and did not have possession until Bullitt had pushed him behind the first down marker; if he had caught the ball cleanly his forward progress would have given the Patriots the first down with only one Colts timeout remaining. Further, the play began before the two-minute warning, and without any timeouts, Belichick was unable to challenge the spot of the ball on the field; if the play had occurred after the two-minute warning, there would have been the possibility for a booth review.

With two minutes remaining and possession at the Patriots' 29-yard line, Manning completed a 15-yard pass to Wayne before Addai gained another 13 yards, setting up 1st-and-goal from the 1-yard line with 36 seconds left in the game. The Patriots stopped Addai on his next run, but Manning threw a 1-yard touchdown pass to Wayne on the play after that, giving the Colts a 35–34 lead with 13 seconds remaining. After the kickoff, with nine seconds remaining, Brady completed a short pass to Welker, who lateraled to Watson, who was then tackled to end the game. The Patriots dropped to 6–3 and 1–3 in road games, while the Colts remained undefeated at 9–0. It was the fifth Patriots loss to the Colts in the previous six games between the two teams.

=== Week 11: vs. New York Jets ===
Quarter	1	2	3	4	Total
Jets	0	7	7	0	14
Patriots	14	10	0	7	31

at Gillette Stadium, Foxborough, Massachusetts

- Game time: 4:15 pm EST
- Game weather: 45 °F (7 °C), cloudy and cool
- Game attendance: 68,756
- Referee: Jeff Triplette
- TV announcers (CBS): Jim Nantz (play-by-play) and Phil Simms (color commentator)

Coming off their loss to the Colts, the Patriots returned home to face the Jets, who had lost six of their last eight games after defeating the Patriots in Week 2. After an exchange of punts to begin the game, the Patriots moved into Jets territory on their second drive with a 25-yard catch by Faulk. Two plays later, Edelman fumbled a direct snap as he went in motion, but recovered his fumble, setting up a 4th-and-1. Maroney then had a 2-yard run to convert, but on the next play fumbled; this time the Jets recovered it at their own 34-yard line. Four plays later, Sanchez was intercepted by Bodden at the Patriots' 47-yard line; Bodden returned the interception 53 yards for a touchdown, giving the Patriots a 7–0 lead. The Jets went three-and-out on their ensuing possession. The Patriots then began a 9-play, 76-yard drive, ending in a 4-yard touchdown pass from Brady to Moss, extending the Patriots lead to 14–0 on the final play of the first quarter.

After another Jets punt, from their end zone after a Banta-Cain sack, the Patriots began their next drive from their own 41-yard line. Seven plays later, Maroney ran in from two yards out to give the Patriots a 21–0 lead. Following a 44-yard kickoff return by Dwight Lowery, the Jets again turned the ball over, with Sanchez throwing his second interception of the game to Bodden, who returned it seven yards to the Patriots' 48-yard line. The Patriots' next drive again reached the red zone, but this time the Patriots could not score a touchdown and were forced to settle for a 26-yard Gostkowski field goal, giving the Patriots a 24–0 lead. Another Jets punt gave the Patriots the ball with just over two minutes remaining. With just under a minute left in the half, Hanson's punt attempt was blocked by Eric Smith and returned four yards for a touchdown by the Jets' Brad Smith. With 45 seconds remaining, the Patriots quickly advanced downfield, but a 40-yard Gostkowski field goal attempt with 15 seconds left in the half fell wide right, keeping the Patriots' lead at 24–7 going into halftime.

With possession at the start of the second half due to their deferral of the opening coin toss, the Jets moved 80 yards on 11 plays, scoring on a 29-yard pass from Sanchez to Cotchery. With a 10-point lead, the Patriots responded with an 11-play drive that reached the Jets' 49-yard line before sack eventually forced a punt. The Jets reached midfield on their next possession before punting as well, with Jets punter Steve Weatherford pinning the Patriots at their own 8-yard line. This forced another Patriots punt, on the first play of the fourth quarter, but the Patriots received the ball right back after Sanchez threw his third interception of the day, again to Bodden, at the Patriots' 26-yard line. The Patriots could not capitalize on the turnover though, and were again forced to punt. Three plays later, Sanchez threw his fourth interception of the game, this time to Meriweather, who returned it four yards to the Jets' 25-yard line. This set up an 8-play, 25-yard Patriots drive that ended in a 1-yard Maroney touchdown run, extending the Patriots' lead to 31–14. The Jets responded with a 37-yard kickoff return by David Clowney followed by a drive to the Patriots' 24-yard line. On a 1st-and-10, Sanchez was strip-sacked by Banta-Cain; the fumble was recovered by Burgess at the Patriots' 29-yard line. With 3:24 left in the game, the Patriots ran the clock down to 25 seconds before punting, giving the Jets the ball to end the game. With the 31–14 win, the Patriots improved their record to 7–3, while the Jets dropped to 4–6. Statistically, Welker had 15 catches for 192 yards on the game, second most in team history, trailing only Troy Brown's 16 receptions in an overtime game on September 22, 2002.

=== Week 12: at New Orleans Saints ===
Quarter	1	2	3	4	Total
Patriots	7	3	7	0	17
Saints	3	21	7	7	38

at Louisiana Superdome, New Orleans, Louisiana

- Game time: 8:30 pm EST/7:30 pm CST
- Game weather: Played indoors, domed stadium
- Game attendance: 70,768
- Referee: Pete Morelli
- TV announcers (ESPN^{[a]}): Mike Tirico (play-by-play), Ron Jaworski and Jon Gruden (color commentators), Michele Tafoya and Suzy Kolber (sideline reporters)

For the second time in three weeks, the Patriots went on the road to square off against an undefeated team; the 10–0 Saints entered the game with the most points scored in the league. After the Patriots deferred the opening coin toss, the Saints returned the opening kickoff to their own 35-yard line before a 33-yard pass from Drew Brees to wide receiver Devery Henderson on the game's first play put the Saints quickly in Patriots territory. However, the Patriots defense stopped the Saints on a 3rd-and-4 from the 15-yard line, setting up a 30-yard John Carney field goal. The Patriots responded by holding the ball for nearly eight minutes, advancing 80 yards on a 14-play drive that ended in a 4-yard touchdown run by Maroney on 4th-and-1, the second such conversion of the drive. The score put the Patriots ahead 7–3.

The Saints did not reach midfield on their next drive and punted; however, the Patriots turned the ball back over when on the ensuing play Brady was intercepted by cornerback Mike McKenzie, who returned it eight yards to the Saints' 41-yard line. Seven plays later, early in the second quarter, the Saints took a 10–7 lead when a Brees dump-off pass to running back Pierre Thomas resulted in an 18-yard touchdown. The Patriots could not reach midfield on their next possession and punted. On the ensuing play, Brees connected with Henderson on a 75-yard touchdown pass that extended the Saints' lead to 17–7. The Patriots faced a 3rd-and-12 early on their next drive, but Brady threw a 33-yard pass to Aiken to move the Patriots into Saints territory. The drive stalled at the Saints' 18-yard line, forcing a 36-yard Gostkowski field goal to cut the Saints' lead to 17–10. Four plays later, Brees hit former Patriots tight end David Thomas on a 25-yard pass before wide receiver Robert Meachem caught a 38-yard touchdown pass to give the Saints a 24–10 lead with just under two minutes left in the half. The Patriots' offense was able to reach the Saints' 32-yard line on first down with 35 seconds left, but advanced no further, setting up a 50-yard Gostkowski field goal attempt on fourth down that fell wide left.

With possession to begin the second half, the Patriots lost it when a 6-yard pass to Maroney, the first play of the half, resulted in a fumble by Maroney at the Patriots' 26-yard line. Saints defensive tackle Sedrick Ellis recovered the fumble and returned it seven yards before he too fumbled; Welker recovered the ball for the Patriots at that spot. Later in the drive, on 3rd-and-9 from their own 42-yard line, Brady hit Aiken on an 11-yard pass to convert; on the play, Brady passed Drew Bledsoe as the Patriots' all-time passing leader. Two plays later, Brady connected with Moss on a 47-yard pass down to the Saints' 2-yard line, setting up a 2-yard Maroney touchdown run that cut the Saints' lead to 24–17. However, the Saints responded on their next play with a 68-yard pass from Brees to wide receiver Marques Colston, setting up a 2-yard touchdown catch by tight end Darnell Dinkins two plays later, re-establishing a 14-point Saints lead. The Patriots moved down to the Saints' 10-yard on their next drive, but attempted to convert on 4th-and-4 from that spot instead of kicking a field goal; Brady's pass attempt to Moss fell incomplete.

The Saints' next drive spanned into the fourth quarter but ended on a punt from the Saints' own 35-yard line. The Patriots fared no better, going three-and-out on their ensuing possession. The Saints continued to build a lead when Brees ended a 9-play, 75-yard drive with a 20-yard touchdown pass to Colston. Down 38–17 with under eight minutes to go, the Patriots tried to mount a drive but two plays in, Brady was intercepted by safety Darren Sharper on a deep pass; Sharper returned it 38 yards to the Patriots' 25-yard line. However, the Saints could not convert a first down and Carney missed a 37-yard field goal wide right. With 5:26 remaining in the game and down 21 points, the Patriots replaced Brady with his backup, Hoyer, on their next possession; the Patriots went three-and-out. After a Saints punt, the Patriots held the ball for the final 1:52 of the game, ending it on an 8-yard sack of Hoyer. With the loss, the Patriots dropped to 7–4 on the season, and 1–4 in road games.

=== Week 13: at Miami Dolphins ===
Quarter	1	2	3	4	Total
Patriots	7	7	7	0	21
Dolphins	0	10	9	3	22

at Land Shark Stadium, Miami Gardens, Florida

- Game time: 1:00 pm EST
- Game weather: 75 °F (24 °C), clear
- Game attendance: 70,102
- Referee: Gene Steratore
- TV announcers (CBS): Jim Nantz (play-by-play) and Phil Simms (color commentator)

Coming off their Monday night loss to the Saints, the Patriots traveled to Miami to face the Dolphins with a two-game lead in the division. The Patriots received the ball to start the game and six plays in, converted a 3rd-and-8 to keep the drive alive. On the next play, Brady threw a 58-yard touchdown pass to Moss to take an early 7–0 lead. Brady was injured on the play and went to the locker room but returned by the next offensive snap. In the meantime, the Dolphins' first possession reached the Patriots' 42-yard line before Henne was sacked by Banta-Cain and Mayo for a loss of seven yards. On the next play, the Dolphins used White in their "pistol" formation and attempted a play action option run, but White's option toss to Ricky Williams was errant and recovered by Williams for a loss of 13 yards. Following the Dolphins' punt, the Patriots began a 13-play, 80-yard drive with 6:41 left in the first quarter and did not surrender the ball until early in the second quarter, extending their lead to 14–0 on a 6-yard Faulk draw for a touchdown. The Dolphins responded with a 10-play, 88-yard drive of their own, including a 29-yard pass to Camarillo, that ended in a 13-yard touchdown pass from Henne to Davone Bess, cutting the Patriots' lead to 14–7. Despite a 16-yard Welker reception to begin the Patriots' next drive, they were forced to punt after four plays. The Dolphins again moved into Patriots territory on their ensuing possession, reaching the 49-yard line before Henne was intercepted by Meriweather at the Patriots' 19-yard line. Following a 19-yard return, a 15-yard unsportsmanlike conduct penalty on Wilfork, and a false start penalty on Watson, the Patriots' next drive began at their own 18-yard line. The Patriots quickly moved into the red zone on a 58-yard Welker catch, but on a 4th-and-1 from the 6-yard line, the Patriots tried to convert, and Morris was stopped short of the first down marker. Off the turnover and with under two minutes remaining, the Dolphins moved 83 yards on 11 plays, cutting the Patriots' halftime lead to 14–10 on a 29-yard Carpenter field goal.

The Dolphins, who had deferred the opening coin toss, chose to receive at the start of the second half but went three-and-out. On the next play (after a penalty), Brady threw a short sideline pass to Aiken, who caught the ball over the defender and proceeded to run down the sideline for an 81-yard touchdown, extending the Patriots' lead to 21–10. It was the third 50+ yard completion of the game for Brady, a career first, and the third longest completion of Brady's career. He also eclipsed 30,000 career passing yards on the play. Following a 51-yard kickoff return by Ted Ginn Jr., the Dolphins took two plays to reach Patriots territory. On a 3rd-and-4 from the Patriots' 46-yard line, Henne attempted a deep sideline pass to wide receiver Brian Hartline, who stopped and turned back to catch the ball but was taken down by Wilhite for a 37-yard defensive pass interference penalty. However, the Pats surrendered only three yards and forced the Dolphins to kick a field goal; Carpenter's 24-yard score cut the Patriots' lead to 21–13. After a Patriots three-and-out, the Dolphins continued to pressure the Patriots defense, moving 64 yards on 12 plays and cutting the deficit to two points on a 7-yard Hartline touchdown catch. The Dolphins attempted to tie the game on a two-point conversion pass attempt to Fasano, but the pass fell incomplete. The Patriots' next drive reached the Dolphins' 39-yard line, where the Patriots again attempted to convert a fourth down, this one with three yards to gain. The Patriots appeared to do so at first, as Welker caught a 13-yard pass from Brady, but the play was nullified by an Aiken offensive pass interference penalty. After another penalty on the first punt attempt, the second punt attempt by Hanson actually gave the Patriots a better break, pinning the Dolphins at their own 3-yard line at the end of the third quarter.

The Dolphins could not move past their 22-yard line on the ensuing possession and punted, giving the Patriots the ball at their own 39-yard line. After several quick first downs, the Patriots reached the red zone. However, a Brady pass attempt intended for Moss in the back corner of the end zone was intercepted by Vontae Davis for a touchback, maintaining a two-point deficit for the Dolphins. However, the Dolphins could not move a yard off the turnover and were forced to punt; the Patriots too went three-and-out. The Dolphins moved to the Patriots' 39-yard line on their ensuing possession, and like the Patriots, faced a fourth down with two yards to go. Henne's pass intended for Bess was broken up by Butler to turn the ball over on downs. However, the Patriots did not gain a yard, and in fact lost one yard on their next possession, setting up a Dolphins possession with 3:44 left in the game. The Dolphins moved 51 yards on 10 plays, reaching the Patriots' 23-yard line with just over one minute remaining. Carpenter then hit a 41-yard field goal to put the Dolphins ahead for the first time in the game, 22–21. Only needing a field goal, the Patriots tried to set up a Gostkowski attempt with under a minute to go, but three plays into their drive Brady was hit as he threw and was intercepted by linebacker Channing Crowder to seal a Dolphins victory. The back-to-back losses were a first for the Patriots since November 2006, and dropped their record to 7–5, while the Dolphins improved to 6–6 and within a game of first place in the division.

=== Week 14: vs. Carolina Panthers ===
Quarter	1	2	3	4	Total
Panthers	7	0	0	3	10
Patriots	0	7	7	6	20

at Gillette Stadium, Foxborough, Massachusetts

- Game time: 1:00 pm EST
- Game weather: 40 °F (4 °C), cloudy
- Game attendance: 68,756
- Referee: Terry McAulay
- TV announcers (Fox): Kenny Albert (play-by-play), Daryl Johnston (color commentator), and Tony Siragusa (sideline reporter)

Coming off consecutive road losses, the Patriots returned home against the Panthers looking to avoid losing three straight games for the first time since 2002. After the Patriots deferred the opening coin toss, the Panthers received the ball to start the game and went three-and-out on their first possession. The Patriots reached the Panthers' 40-yard line on their next drive before attempting to convert a 4th-and-1; Morris was stopped short of the first down marker to turn the ball over. However, the Panthers and backup quarterback Matt Moore, playing for an injured Jake Delhomme, also went three-and-out on their ensuing possession. The Patriots responded by again advancing to the Panthers' 40-yard line before this time punting. After another Panthers punt, the Patriots turned the ball back over after Brady was intercepted by Chris Gamble on a short pass intended for Moss at the Patriots' 48-yard line. Two plays later, Moore connected with wide receiver Steve Smith on a 41-yard touchdown pass to give the Panthers a 7–0 lead. The Patriots next drive reached the Panthers' 37-yard line before Moss caught a pass from Brady but then fumbled it; the Panthers' Dan Connor recovered the fumble at the Panthers' 21-yard line. The Panthers, however, lost a net of one yard on their next drive and punted. This was followed by a Patriots three-and-out, a short Panthers drive and a punt, and another Patriots three-and-out. The Panthers then mounted a 10-play, 45-yard drive that ended on a missed 53-yard field goal attempt by John Kasay. The Patriots responded with a 5-play, 57-yard drive that moved deep into Panthers territory on a 30-yard pass interference penalty on the Panthers' James Anderson on a pass attempt to Watson. Faulk later ran in for a 3-yard touchdown to tie the game at halftime.

The Patriots' first drive of the second half began at the Patriots' 11-yard line and ended on the Panthers' 14-yard line when Morris fumbled following a 10-yard run; it was recovered by the Panthers' Captain Munnerlyn. The Panthers responded with a 26-yard DeAngelo Williams run followed by a 12-yard Jeff King catch to pass midfield; however two consecutive Panthers illegal shift penalties would help force a punt after a 13-yard Tyrell Sutton run on third down. The punt was downed at the Patriots' 4-yard line, and a Patriots challenge that the player who downed it, Quinton Teal, was in the end zone was not successful. However, the Patriots responded by mounting their longest drive of the season, 96 yards on 13 plays, and behind five Welker catches and a 5-yard Watson touchdown catch took a 14–7 lead late in the third quarter. The Panthers moved back downfield on a 9-play, 57-yard drive that ended on a 36-yard Kasay field goal after the Patriots defense held the Panthers to two yards after a 1st-and-10 from the 20-yard line. The Patriots extended their lead to 17–10 on a 48-yard Gostkowski field goal following a 10-play, 46-yard drive. After a 34-yard Panthers punt on their next possession, a three-and-out, the Patriots had the ball at the Panthers' 42-yard line but could only advance 13 yards on seven plays, with the drive being kept alive on a roughing the kicker penalty during a Patriots punt. The Patriots then took a 20–10 lead on a 47-yard Gostkowski field goal. With under four minutes to go, the Panthers faced a 3rd-and-10 from their own 25-yard line, but a Burgess sack of Moore forced a punt. The Patriots then ran out the final 2:32 of the game to seal a 20–10 victory. With the win, the Patriots moved to 8–5 on the season.

=== Week 15: at Buffalo Bills ===
Quarter	1	2	3	4	Total
Patriots	0	14	3	0	17
Bills	3	0	0	7	10

at Ralph Wilson Stadium, Orchard Park, New York

- Game time: 1:00 pm EST
- Game weather: 28 °F (−2 °C), cloudy
- Game attendance: 70,000
- Referee: Tony Corrente
- TV announcers (CBS): Greg Gumbel (play-by-play) and Dan Dierdorf (color commentator)

Trying to win their first road game in an opponent's stadium for the first time in 2009, the Patriots traveled to Buffalo with a one-game lead in the division. After winning the toss, the Bills received the opening kickoff and began a 14-play, 69-yard drive that elapsed over nine minutes of the first quarter. After the Bills reached the Patriots' 2-yard line on 3rd-and-goal, a false start penalty and an incomplete pass limited the Bills to a 25-yard Lindell field goal. The Patriots' first possession reached midfield before a Brady pass intended for Welker was intercepted by linebacker Paul Posluszny at the Bills' 39-yard line. However, another penalty and two straight sacks set up a Bills three-and-out. The Patriots' next drive spanned into the second quarter, moving 75 yards on 5 plays; the Patriots moved to the Bills' 3-yard line on a 43-yard defensive pass interference penalty on Donte Whitner. Brady then hit Moss in the back of the end zone for a 13-yard touchdown, putting the Patriots ahead 7–3. The Bills offense continued to struggle on their next possession, facing a 2nd-and-23 and a 3rd-and-20 before punting; the Patriots advanced into Bills territory on their next possession before also punting. This time the Bills offense began to move the ball, reaching midfield before quarterback Ryan Fitzpatrick threw an interception to Wilhite at the Patriots' 36-yard line. With 3:30 remaining, the Patriots drove back downfield, and assisted by a 21-yard defensive pass interference penalty, into the red zone. Maroney then ran for a 1-yard touchdown to give the Patriots a 14–3 lead. Following a 41-yard Bills kickoff return, they were able to reach the Patriots' 38-yard line and attempt a 56-yard field goal at the end of the half, but it fell wide left to keep the score at 14–3.

Both teams opened the second half with three-and-out punts. The Patriots came back with a 14-play, 64-yard drive that ended on a 30-yard Gostkowski field goal. The Bills, however, responded with a lengthy drive of their own before an offensive holding penalty and two incompletions set up a punt from the Patriots' 38-yard line early in the fourth quarter. After an exchange of four punts, the Bills drove to the Patriots' 12-yard line, before an incompletion, a one-yard run, and two more incompletions turned the ball over on downs. With just over four minutes left in the game, the Patriots were unable to gain a yard net on their next drive, in fact losing one yard in the process, before punting back to the Bills with 3:37 left; a 38-yard punt and a 20-yard return gave the Bills the ball at the Patriots' 28-yard line. After a 17-yard completion to Josh Reed, Fitzpatrick threw an 11-yard touchdown pass to Lee Evans to cut the Patriots' lead to 17–10. The Bills attempted an onside kickoff with 3:02 remaining in the game, which was recovered by the Bills but nullified on an offsides penalty. The Bills then kicked off normally to the Patriots, hoping for a defensive stop. However, on the first play after the two-minute warning, the Patriots converted a third down on an 8-yard pass to Welker, sealing a Patriots victory. The win moved the Patriots to 9–5 on the season and gave them a two-game lead in the division.

=== Week 16: vs. Jacksonville Jaguars ===
Quarter	1	2	3	4	Total
Jaguars	0	0	0	7	7
Patriots	7	21	0	7	35

at Gillette Stadium, Foxborough, Massachusetts

- Game time: 1:00 pm EST
- Game weather: 55 °F (13 °C), cloudy and mild
- Game attendance: 68,756
- Referee: Don Carey
- TV announcers (CBS): Kevin Harlan (play-by-play) and Solomon Wilcots (color commentator)

Looking to secure their third straight win and another division title, the Patriots returned home to face the 7–7 Jaguars. After the Jaguars deferred the opening coin toss, the Patriots received the opening kickoff to begin a 10-play, 82-yard drive. On a 1st-and-goal run from the Jaguars' 1-yard line, Maroney fumbled before breaking the plane of the goal line; it was recovered by Jaguars linebacker Daryl Smith at the 1-yard line. The Jaguars reached their own 35-yard line on their ensuing possession before failing to convert on a fourth down attempt, turning the ball back over the Patriots. Two plays after a 21-yard Morris run, Brady and Moss connected on a 2-yard touchdown reception to give the Patriots a 7–0 lead. After the kickoff, the Jaguars drove to the Patriots' 42-yard line before a David Garrard pass intended for Marcedes Lewis was intercepted by Meriweather at the Patriots' 17-yard line and returned 56 yards. Two plays later, on the first play of the second quarter, Brady threw a 26-yard touchdown pass to Baker to extend the Patriots' lead to 14–0.

The Jaguars continued to move the ball on their next possession, reaching midfield on completions of 15 and 14 yards; however a false start penalty negated another 15-yard reception and the Jaguars were forced to punt. Following a Patriots' three-and-out, Garrard was strip-sacked by Banta-Cain on the first play of the Jaguars' next-drive; tackle Eben Britton recovered the fumble for the Jaguars, who punted three plays later. On the third play of their ensuing drive, the Patriots moved into the red zone on a 55-yard Morris run, and later took a 21–0 lead on a 1-yard Morris touchdown run. After another Jaguars three-and-out, the Patriots moved into Jaguars territory on a 29-yard Welker catch and later extended their lead to 28–0 on a 6-yard touchdown reception by Moss. This would remain the score after the Jaguars ended the half on another punt.

The Jaguars began the second half with a 16-play, 69-yard drive that took over eight minutes off the clock; however, it ended without any points after Garrard was intercepted by Springs at the Patriots' 2-yard line on a 3rd-and-goal from the 5-yard line. The Patriots responded with a 10-play, 90-yard drive of their own, despite a false start penalty to begin it. On the first play of the fourth quarter, Brady hit Moss on his third touchdown catch of the game, putting the Patriots ahead 35–0. However, the Jaguars responded quickly, moving past midfield on a 22-yard Rashad Jennings run and into the red zone on a 20-yard Nate Hughes reception. Two plays later, Garrard scrambled two yards for a touchdown, cutting the Patriots' lead to 35–7. With 12:41 remaining in the game, the Patriots received the ball after the kickoff. What ensued was a 20-play drive, with the Patriots reaching midfield with about ten minutes remaining in the game, and reaching the Jaguars' 10-yard line by the two-minute warning. The drive included five first downs, including two off fourth down conversions. One play after the two-minute warning, Hoyer replaced Brady at quarterback, and one play later, the Patriots turned the ball over on downs after a failed 4th-and-2 run by Morris. The Jaguars, with 29 seconds left in the game, ran one play to end the game. With the win, the Patriots secured their first division title since 2007 and posted a 10–5 record heading into the final week of the season.

=== Week 17: at Houston Texans ===
Quarter	1	2	3	4	Total
Patriots	7	6	7	7	27
Texans	7	6	0	21	34

at Reliant Stadium, Houston, Texas

- Game time: 1:00 pm EST/12:00 pm CST
- Game weather: Played with roof closed, retractable roof stadium
- Game attendance: 71,029
- Referee: John Parry
- TV announcers (CBS): Kevin Harlan (play-by-play) and Solomon Wilcots (color commentator)

On the final week of the regular season, the Patriots traveled to Houston having wrapped up a division title but still playing for the third seed in the AFC playoffs. The Texans, meanwhile, needed a victory plus help from other teams to earn a playoff berth. The Patriots did not activate Wilfork, Warren, Faulk, Maroney, or Bodden for the game. The Texans won the opening coin toss and received the opening kickoff, driving 76 yards on seven plays and taking a 7–0 lead on a 25-yard touchdown reception by tight end Joel Dreessen. On the fourth play of the Patriots' opening drive, Welker caught a 12-yard pass from Brady, and when cutting to avoid a tackler, had his knee buckle and fell to the ground. He suffered a torn MCL and ACL on the play in his left knee and was placed on injured reserve. The Patriots, who replaced Welker with Edelman, drove to the Texans' 42-yard line before punting. Following a Texans three-and-out, the Patriots began a drive from their own 37-yard line and capped a 9-play, 63-yard drive with a 4-yard touchdown run by Taylor, tying the game at 7–7. After a 36-yard kickoff return by André Davis, the Texans passed midfield on a 16-yard Dreessen catch, but could not advance any further and punted, early in the second quarter.

The Patriots responded with a 9-play, 58-yard drive that ended in a 51-yard Gostkowski field goal to give the Patriots a 10–7 lead. On their ensuing possession, the Texans drove to the Patriots' 1-yard line before attempting to convert a fourth down; quarterback Matt Schaub's pass fell incomplete to Andre Johnson to turn the ball over on downs and give the Patriots the ball at their own 1-yard line. On the next play, Taylor fumbled after a handoff from Brady; the ball was recovered by Bernard Pollard in the end zone for a touchdown. However, kicker Kris Brown missed the extra point to keep the score at 13–10. Hoyer entered the game at quarterback for the Patriots on their next drive. He led the Patriots from their own 9-yard line to the Texans' 25-yard line, with the Patriots settling for a 43-yard Gostkowski field goal with less than a minute remaining in the first half. Brown missed a 56-yard field goal as time expired in the half for the Texans to keep the score tied at 13 at halftime.

Brady re-entered the game for the Patriots to begin the second half, but the Patriots failed to reach midfield and punted. The Texans then drove from their own 16-yard line to the Patriots' 15-yard line before a Schaub pass intended for wide receiver Jacoby Jones was tipped and intercepted by Butler at the 9-yard line and returned 91 yards for a touchdown, giving the Patriots a 20–13 lead. The Texans continued to move the ball on their next possession, reaching the 20-yard line before Brown missed another field goal, a 38-yarder. The Patriots next drive spanned into the fourth quarter, and ended with an 11-yard Taylor touchdown to extend the Patriots' lead to 27–13. However, the Texans again drove on the Patriots, with a 26-yard defensive pass interference penalty on Butler setting up an 8-yard touchdown pass from Schaub to Jones. The Patriots went three-and-out on their next possession, giving the ball back to the Texans with 7:30 left in the game. After a 31-yard punt return by Jones, the Texans drove from the Patriots' 34-yard line and tied the game on a 1-yard touchdown run by Arian Foster with 4:46 left. Two plays later, Brady was intercepted by Pollard on a long pass intended for Aiken; Pollard returned the interception from the Patriots' 43-yard line to the 28-yard line. On the first play after the two-minute warning, Foster ran in for a 3-yard touchdown to give the Texans a 34–27 lead. Hoyer entered the game again for the Patriots and reached the Texans' 34-yard line before a fourth down pass intended for Edelman fell incomplete. The Texans then kneeled to end the game. The loss gave the Patriots 10–6 record for the season and also gave the Texans their first winning season in franchise history, at 9–7.

== Standings ==
AFC East
	W	L	T	PCT	DIV	CONF	PF	PA	STK
^{(3)} New England Patriots	10	6	0	.625	4–2	7–5	427	285	L1
^{(5)} New York Jets	9	7	0	.563	2–4	7–5	348	236	W2
Miami Dolphins	7	9	0	.438	4–2	5–7	360	390	L3
Buffalo Bills	6	10	0	.375	2–4	4–8	258	326	W1

=== Standings breakdown ===
	W	L	T	Pct.	PF	PA
Home	8	0	0	1.000	250	103
Away	2	6	0	.250	177	182
AFC East Opponents	4	2	0	.667	130	103
AFC Opponents	7	5	0	.583	329	220
NFC Opponents	3	1	0	.750	98	65
By Stadium Type
Indoors	0	3	0	.000	78	107
Outdoors	10	3	0	.769	349	178

=== Schedule ===
Round	Date	Opponent (seed)	Result	Record	Venue	Recap
Wild Card	January 10, 2010	Baltimore Ravens (6)	L 14–33	0–1	Gillette Stadium	Recap

== Postseason results ==
=== AFC Wild Card Playoffs vs. (6) Baltimore Ravens ===
AFC Wild Card Playoffs: (6) Baltimore Ravens at (3) New England Patriots – Game summary

Quarter	1	2	3	4	Total
Ravens	24	0	3	6	33
Patriots	0	7	7	0	14

at Gillette Stadium, Foxborough, Massachusetts

- Game time: 1:00 pm EST
- Game weather: 20 °F (−7 °C), sunny and cold
- Game attendance: 68,756
- Referee: Gene Steratore
- TV announcers (CBS): Jim Nantz (play-by-play) and Phil Simms (color commentator)

Game information
First quarter
- BAL – Ray Rice 83-yard run (Billy Cundiff kick), 14:43. Ravens 7–0. Drive: 1 play, 83 yards, 0:17.
- BAL – Le'Ron McClain 1-yard run (Billy Cundiff kick) 10:29. Ravens 14–0. Drive: 5 plays, 17 yards, 2:44.
- BAL – Ray Rice 1-yard run (Billy Cundiff kick) 3:55. Ravens 21–0. Drive: 6 plays, 25 yards, 2:54.
- BAL – Billy Cundiff 27-yard field goal, 1:19. Ravens 24–0. Drive: 4 plays, 0 yards, 1:37.

Second quarter

- NE – Julian Edelman 6-yard pass from Tom Brady (Stephen Gostkowski kick), 11:23. Ravens 24–7. Drive: 6 plays, 16 yards, 2:45.

Third quarter

- BAL – Billy Cundiff 23-yard field goal, 6:18. Ravens 27–7. Drive: 6 plays, 18 yards, 3:31.
- NE – Julian Edelman 1-yard pass from Tom Brady (Stephen Gostkowski kick), 1:47. Ravens 27–14. Drive: 10 plays, 53 yards, 4:31.

Fourth quarter

- BAL – Willis McGahee 3-yard run (run failed), 10:32. Ravens 33–14. Drive: 12 plays, 52 yards, 6:15.

The Ravens converted three first-quarter turnovers by Patriots quarterback Tom Brady into 17 points on their way to a 24–0 lead New England could not recover from. It was the Patriots' first home loss of the season and their first home loss in the playoffs in more than 30 years. On top of that, it was the Ravens' first ever win against the Patriots after five consecutive losses.

Baltimore stormed to a 7–0 lead on the first play of the game with Ray Rice's 83-yard touchdown run, the second longest run in NFL playoff history. Then linebacker Terrell Suggs forced and recovered a fumble from Brady on the Patriots 17-yard line, and they scored another touchdown with a 1-yard run by Le'Ron McClain. Following an exchange of punts, cornerback Chris Carr intercepted a pass from Brady and returned it to the New England 25-yard line, setting up Rice's second touchdown on a 1-yard run. Just two plays after the ensuing kickoff, Ravens safety Ed Reed intercepted a deep pass from Brady and returned it 25 yards before lateraling the ball to safety Dawan Landry, who took it another 25 yards to the Patriots 9-yard line. The Ravens could not gain any yards on their ensuing drive, but Billy Cundiff kicked a field goal to make the score 24–0.

New England was forced to punt on their next drive, but Baltimore returner Tom Zbikowski muffed the kick and Kyle Arrington recovered the ball for the Patriots at the Ravens 16-yard line. Five plays later, Brady threw a 6-yard touchdown pass to Julian Edelman. But midway through the second half, Brady threw his third interception of the game, this one to Landry, who returned it 42 yards to the New England 22-yard line to set up another Cundiff field goal. Taking the ball back at the Patriots 47-yard line after Darius Butler's 42-yard kickoff return, New England responded with a 53-yard scoring drive. Brady finished it with his second touchdown pass to Edelman to cut their deficit to 27–14.

Zbikowski returned the ensuing kickoff 30 yards to his own 48-yard line, sparking a 52-yard drive that ended with a 3-yard touchdown run from Willis McGahee, making the score 33–14 after the two-point conversion failed. New England responded with a drive deep into Baltimore territory, but Stephen Gostkowski missed a 44-yard field goal attempt with 7:19 left in the game, ending any chance of a miracle comeback.

Rice rushed for 159 yards and two touchdowns, while McGahee added 62 yards and a score. Neither quarterback had much success, as Brady was held to 154 yards and intercepted three times, while Baltimore's Joe Flacco completed only 4 of 10 passes for 34 yards.

== Final roster ==
2009 New England Patriots roster
Quarterbacks (QB): 12 Tom Brady; 8 Brian Hoyer; Running backs (RB): 33 Kevin Faulk KR/PR; 42 BenJarvus Green-Ellis; 39 Laurence Maroney KR; 34 Sammy Morris; 21 Fred Taylor; Wide receivers (WR): 88 Sam Aiken; 11 Julian Edelman; 81 Randy Moss; 18 Matthew Slater KR; 15 Isaiah Stanback; Tight ends (TE): 86 Chris Baker; 84 Ben Watson	Offensive linemen (OL): 63 Dan Connolly G; 77 Nick Kaczur T; 67 Dan Koppen C; 64 Mark LeVoir T; 72 Matt Light T; 70 Logan Mankins G; 61 Stephen Neal G; 60 Rich Ohrnberger G; 76 Sebastian Vollmer T; 69 Ryan Wendell C; Defensive linemen (DL): 92 Ron Brace NT; 97 Jarvis Green DE; 91 Myron Pryor DE; 94 Ty Warren DE; 75 Vince Wilfork NT; 99 Mike Wright DE	Linebackers (LB): 52 Eric Alexander ILB; 95 Tully Banta-Cain OLB; 53 Derrick Burgess OLB; 59 Gary Guyton ILB; 51 Jerod Mayo ILB; 50 Rob Ninkovich OLB; 55 Junior Seau ILB; 96 Adalius Thomas OLB; 48 Thomas Williams ILB; 58 Pierre Woods OLB; Defensive backs (DB): 27 Kyle Arrington CB; 23 Leigh Bodden CB; 28 Darius Butler CB/KR; 25 Pat Chung SS; 30 Brandon McGowan FS; 31 Brandon Meriweather SS; 36 James Sanders FS; 29 Shawn Springs CB; 22 Terrence Wheatley CB; 24 Jonathan Wilhite CB; Special teams (ST): 3 Stephen Gostkowski K; 6 Chris Hanson P; 47 Jake Ingram LS	Practice squad: 85 Robbie Agnone TE (IR); 49 Bruce Davis LB; 65 Adrian Grady NT; 10 Darnell Jenkins WR; 17 Nick Moore WR; 80 Rob Myers TE; 14 Robert Ortiz WR; 90 Darryl Richard DE; 9 Jeff Rowe QB; Reserve: 15 Tyree Barnes WR (Military); 66 George Bussey G (IR); 98 Shawn Crable LB (IR); -- Eric Kettani FB (Military); 38 Bret Lockett S (IR); 44 Tyrone McKenzie LB (IR); 19 Brandon Tate (IR); 35 Chris Taylor RB (IR); 83 Wes Welker (IR); 16 Shun White WR (Military); Rookies in italics 53 active, 11 reserve, 9 practice squad

== Awards and honors ==
Recipient	Award(s)
Leigh Bodden	Week 11: AFC Defensive Player of the Week
Tom Brady	Week 1: AFC Offensive Player of the Week; Week 6: AFC Offensive Player of the Week; October: AFC Offensive Player of the Month; Week 16: AFC Offensive Player of the Week; 2009 New England Patriots Ed Block Courage Award; 2009 NFL Comeback Player of the Year
Kevin Faulk	2009 New England Patriots Ron Burton Community Service Award
Stephen Gostkowski	Week 9: AFC Special Teams Player of the Week
Brandon Meriweather	Week 7: AFC Defensive Player of the Week

=== Pro Bowl and All-Pro selections ===
Four Patriots were elected to the 2010 Pro Bowl. Guard Logan Mankins and defensive tackle Vince Wilfork were named as starters, while wide receiver Wes Welker and quarterback Tom Brady were named as a reserves. After Welker suffered a season-ending injury in Week 17, Randy Moss was named as his replacement in the Pro Bowl, while safety Brandon Meriweather was also an injury replacement. Moss subsequently pulled out of the game due to injury, as did Brady.

Welker and Mankins were also voted to the 2009 All-Pro First Team and Second Team, respectively.
