= List of Navy Midshipmen in the NFL draft =

This is a list of Navy Midshipmen football players in the NFL draft.

== Key ==
B	Back	K	Kicker	NT	Nose tackle
C	Center	LB	Linebacker	FB	Fullback
DB	Defensive back	P	Punter	HB	Halfback
DE	Defensive end	QB	Quarterback	WR	Wide receiver
DT	Defensive tackle	RB	Running back	G	Guard
E	End	T	Offensive tackle	TE	Tight end

== Selections ==
Year	Round	Pick	Overall	Player	Team	Position
1947	28	9	264	Jim Carrington	New York Giants	G
1948	13	8	113	Dick Scott	Chicago Bears	C
1956	16	5	186	George Welsh	Chicago Cardinals	QB
1956	17	4	197	Ron Beagle	Chicago Cardinals	E
1958	20	8	237	Tom Forrestal	Baltimore Colts	QB
1959	4	9	45	Bob Reifsnyder	Los Angeles Rams	T
1961	17	3	227	Joe Bellino	Washington Redskins	B
1962	14	12	194	Greg Mather	New York Giants	E
1964	10	3	129	Roger Staubach	Dallas Cowboys	QB
1973	16	24	414	Glen Nardi	Pittsburgh Steelers	DT
1986	4	26	108	Napoleon McCallum	Los Angeles Raiders	RB
1993	7	15	183	Bob Kuberski	Green Bay Packers	DE
1994	6	7	168	Max Lane	New England Patriots	T
1995	6	15	186	Kevin Hickman	Detroit Lions	TE
1998	2	0	0	Mike Wahle	Green Bay Packers	G
2015	5	30	166	Joe Cardona	New England Patriots	LS
2016	6	7	182	Keenan Reynolds	Baltimore Ravens	RB
2020	7	32	246	Malcolm Perry	Miami Dolphins	RB
2025	6	24	200	Rayuan Lane III	Jacksonville Jaguars	S
2026	7	10	226	Landon Robinson	Cincinnati Bengals	DT
2026	7	14	230	Eli Heidenreich	Pittsburgh Steelers	RB

== Notable undrafted players ==
Note: No drafts held before 1936

Debut Year	Player	Debut Team	Position	Notes
1947	Ben Chase	Detroit Lions	G	—
1947	Jack Martin	Los Angeles Rams	C	—
1949	Dick Duden	New York Giants	DE	—
1950	Joe Bartos	Washington Football Team	DB	—
1979	Phil McConkey	New York Giants	WR	—
1996	Jim Kubiak	Carolina Panthers	QB	—
1998	Chris McCoy	Green Bay Packers	RB	—
1998	David Viger	New York Jets	DT	—
2000	Travis Williams	Green Bay Packers	WR	—
2005	Kyle Eckel	New England Patriots	RB	—
2009	Tyree Barnes	New England Patriots	WR	—
2009	Eric Kettani	New England Patriots	RB	—
2009	Shun White	New England Patriots	WR	—
2022	Diego Fagot	Baltimore Ravens	LB	—
2026	Alex Tecza	Pittsburgh Steelers	RB	—
