= Pierre Woods =

American football player (born 1982)

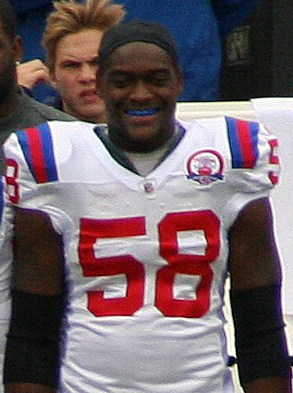
- Woods with the Patriots

No. 58, 49, 53
- Position: Linebacker

Personal information
- Born: January 6, 1982 (age 44); Cleveland, Ohio, U.S.
- Listed height: 6 ft 5 in (1.96 m)
- Listed weight: 250 lb (113 kg)

Career information
- High school: Glenville (Cleveland)
- College: Michigan
- NFL draft: 2006: undrafted

Career history
- New England Patriots (2006–2010); Buffalo Bills (2010); Cleveland Gladiators (2013)

Awards and highlights
- Second-team All-Big Ten (2003)

Career NFL statistics
- Total tackles: 112
- Sacks: 2
- Forced fumbles: 1
- Pass deflections: 1
- Stats at Pro Football Reference

Career AFL statistics
- Total tackles: 12.5
- Pass deflections: 1
- Stats at ArenaFan.com

Pierre Woods (born January 6, 1982) is an American former professional football player who was a linebacker in the National Football League (NFL). He played college football for the Michigan Wolverines and was signed by the New England Patriots as an undrafted free agent in 2006.

== Early life ==
Woods was a two-year letterman at Glenville High School in Cleveland, Ohio under the guidance of coach Ted Ginn Sr., and his most notable teammates at the time were Troy Smith, Donte Whitner and Ted Ginn Jr. He played in the first ever U.S. Army All-American Bowl game on December 30, 2000, alongside fellow Michigan Wolverine Marlin Jackson. He recorded 173 tackles and 42 sacks, caused seven fumbles and intercepted one pass during prep career and also tallied 34 career receptions for 581 yards and 13 touchdowns as a tight end. He registered 92 tackles, 26 sacks, five forced fumbles and one interception during senior campaign and was Second-team USA Today High School All-America. He was also a four-year letterman and three-year starter on the varsity basketball team.

== College career ==
Woods attended the University of Michigan where he appeared in all 13 games as a redshirt freshman and did not see any action as a freshman. As a sophomore in 2003 he had 68 tackles and led team with 14 tackles for loss and seven sacks and was second-team All-Big Ten after starting all 13 games at outside linebacker. In 2004, played in 12 games, recording 22 tackles, one tackle for loss and one fumble recovery. As a senior in 2005, played in all 12 games and made five starts at linebacker and made 24 tackles, 11 tackles for loss, three sacks, one pass breakup and two forced fumbles...

== Professional career ==
=== Pre-draft ===
Pre-draft measurables
Height	Weight	40-yard dash	20-yard shuttle	Three-cone drill	Vertical jump	Broad jump	Bench press
6 ft 4 3/8 in (1.94 m)	249 lb (113 kg)	4.75 s	4.19 s	6.87 s	33 in (0.84 m)	9 ft 11 in (3.02 m)	15 reps
All values from NFL Scouting Combine except shuttle, 3-cone, broad and vertical jump (Michigan Pro Day)

=== New England Patriots ===
Woods was signed by the New England Patriots after going undrafted in the 2006 NFL draft. In his rookie season, Woods saw action in eight games and finished fourth on the team with 11 special teams tackles In 2007, he played in all 16 regular-season games for the first time in his career and led the team in special teams tackles with 21. In 2008, he led the team in special teams tackles in three games and made his first career start on November 13, 2008, against the New York Jets and made nine tackles (7 solo) in the game. However, Woods suffered an arm injury weeks later and was placed on injured reserve on December 13. Woods returned in 2009 to play in all 16 games for the Patriots, starting five. He finished the season with 36 tackles, 18 of which came on special teams. He was released during final cuts on September 4, 2010.

Woods was re-signed by the Patriots on November 17, 2010, one day after the team waived outside linebacker Shawn Crable. He recorded his second career sack in the team's Week 12 Thanksgiving game against the Detroit Lions. The Patriots waived Woods on December 3, 2010.

=== Buffalo Bills ===
Woods was claimed off waivers by the Buffalo Bills on December 6, 2010.

On February 11, 2011, Woods was released from the team's roster and became an unrestricted free agent.

=== Cleveland Gladiators ===
On November 9, 2012, Woods was assigned to the Cleveland Gladiators of the Arena Football League. After going on injured reserve after Week 11, Woods was reassigned after the Gladiators Week 12 game.

== Personal life ==
Pierre Woods has three daughters and two sons. His oldest daughters' name is Paris Woods.
