= Jake Ingram =

American football player (born 1985)

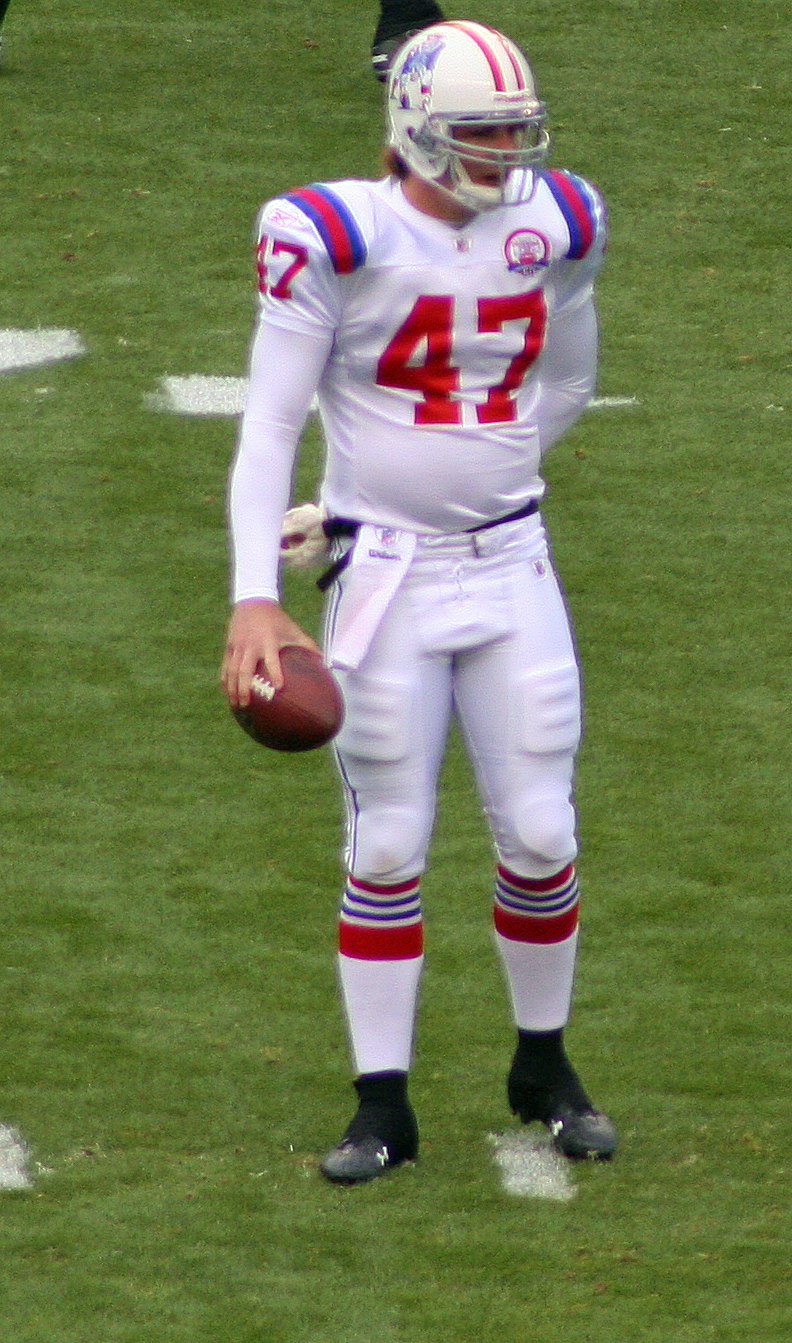
- Ingram with the New England Patriots in 2009

No. 47, 50
- Position: Long snapper

Personal information
- Born: February 23, 1985 (age 41); Albuquerque, New Mexico, U.S.
- Listed height: 6 ft 3 in (1.91 m)
- Listed weight: 232 lb (105 kg)

Career information
- High school: Mililani (Mililani, Hawaii)
- College: Hawaii (2005–2008)
- NFL draft: 2009: 6th round, 198th overall pick

Career history
- New England Patriots (2009–2010); New Orleans Saints (2010); Tennessee Titans (2011)*; Jacksonville Jaguars (2011)*; Tennessee Titans (2012)*; Las Vegas Locomotives (2012)
- * Offseason or practice squad member only

Career NFL statistics
- Games played: 25
- Stats at Pro Football Reference

Jacob Ingram (born February 23, 1985) is an American former professional football player who was a long snapper in the National Football League (NFL) and United Football League (UFL). He played college football at University of Hawaiʻi at Mānoa and was selected by the New England Patriots in the sixth round of the 2009 NFL draft as a center.

== Early life ==
Ingram played football at Mililani High School in Mililani, Hawaii, on the island of Oʻahu where he also lettered in track.

== College career ==
Originally a walk-on at defensive end, Hawaii coach, June Jones had him switch full-time to long snapper during his fourth game at Hawaii. He remained the team's long snapper for the rest of his collegiate career.

== Professional career ==
Pre-draft measurables
Height	Weight	Arm length	Hand span	40-yard dash	10-yard split	20-yard split	20-yard shuttle	Vertical jump	Broad jump	Bench press
6 ft 2 7/8 in (1.90 m)	232 lb (105 kg)	31 3/4 in (0.81 m)	9 in (0.23 m)	4.90 s	1.66 s	2.84 s	4.52 s	30.5 in (0.77 m)	9 ft 9 in (2.97 m)	18 reps
All values from NFL Combine/Pro Day

=== New England Patriots ===
Ingram was selected by the Patriots in the sixth round (198th overall) of the 2009 NFL draft, the only long snapper selected in that draft. He competed with veteran long snapper Nathan Hodel, who was already on the roster when the Patriots drafted Ingram; Hodel was later released on August 31, 2009.

Ingram played in all 16 games of the 2009 season for the Patriots and helped kicker Stephen Gostkowski to make a career high 53-yard field goal.

In 2010, Ingram snapped for the first eight games of the season before being waived on November 10, 2010.

=== New Orleans Saints ===
Ingram was signed by the New Orleans Saints on November 20, 2010, replacing Jason Kyle, who was placed on injured reserve. He was waived by the Saints on November 22, after appearing in one game.

=== Tennessee Titans ===
Ingram was signed by the Tennessee Titans before 2011, but was waived on August 18, 2011.

=== Jacksonville Jaguars ===
On August 27, 2011, Ingram signed with the Jacksonville Jaguars. He was cut by Jacksonville on September 3.

== Personal life ==
His younger brother, Luke was also a long snapper at Hawaii. Following his NFL career, Ingram was a police officer in Lanai for a while and then moved back to Maui.
