= Eric Alexander (American football) =

American football player (born 1982)

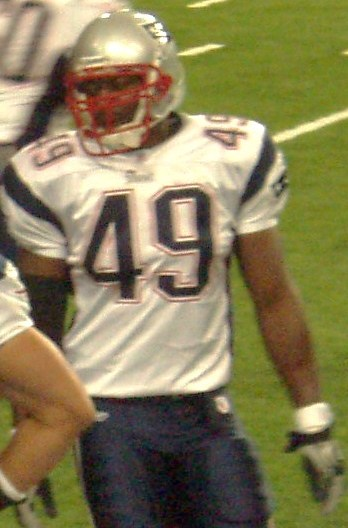
- Alexander with the New England Patriots in 2005

No. 49, 52, 57, 53
- Position: Linebacker

Personal information
- Born: February 8, 1982 (age 44); Tyler, Texas, U.S.
- Listed height: 6 ft 2 in (1.88 m)
- Listed weight: 240 lb (109 kg)

Career information
- High school: Stephen F. Austin (Port Arthur, Texas)
- College: LSU
- NFL draft: 2004: undrafted

Career history
- New England Patriots (2004–2009); Jacksonville Jaguars (2010); Cleveland Browns (2010)

Awards and highlights
- Super Bowl champion (XXXIX); BCS national champion (2003)

Career NFL statistics
- Total tackles: 57
- Forced fumbles: 2
- Stats at Pro Football Reference

Eric Vonkey Alexander (born February 8, 1982) is an American former professional football player who was a linebacker in the National Football League (NFL). He played college football for the LSU Tigers and was signed by the New England Patriots as an undrafted free agent in 2004. He also played for the Jacksonville Jaguars and Cleveland Browns.

== Early life ==
Alexander attended Stephen F. Austin High in Port Acres, Texas, where he played football as a running back and safety while also participating in baseball and track and field. He was twice named a member of The Port Arthur News Super Team and was an honorable All-State mention before graduating in 2000.

== College career ==
Alexander attended Louisiana State University beginning in 2000. In his first three seasons with the Tigers, he was a backup safety and special teams contributor. Alexander moved to linebacker before his senior season in 2003 and recorded 65 tackles and five sacks in LSU's BCS Championship season.

== Professional career ==
=== New England Patriots ===
Alexander was signed by the New England Patriots as an undrafted free agent following the 2004 NFL draft. He was waived by the Patriots on September 5, 2004, and re-signed to the team's practice squad the next day. He was promoted to the 53-man roster on December 20, 2004, but was placed on injured reserve during the playoffs on January 13, 2005. Alexander was again released during final cuts in 2005 and was re-signed to the practice squad the next day, September 4, 2005. He was elevated to the 53-man roster for the team's Week 5 game against the Atlanta Falcons, waived after the game, and re-signed to the practice squad, where he spent the rest of the season.

After the 2005 season, Alexander was re-signed by the Patriots, and in 2006, Alexander made the Patriots' opening day roster for the first time in his career. He appeared in 14 games in 2006, a career high, and in the AFC Championship, Alexander made the first start of his NFL career in a loss to the Indianapolis Colts, leading the team with 10 solo tackles at inside linebacker. Alexander again made the opening day roster in 2007, appearing in 12 games and leading the team in special teams tackles in two games. However, Alexander was inactive for all but one game in 2008 before being placed on injured reserve on November 22. He was re-signed as a restricted free agent by the Patriots following the 2008 season. He was released on October 20, 2009, and re-signed the next day to a different contract. He signed a one-year extension on November 23, 2009. He played in 14 games in 2009, recording 12 tackles on special teams. He was released on September 4, 2010, during final cuts.

=== Jacksonville Jaguars ===
Alexander was signed by the Jacksonville Jaguars on September 27, 2010. He was waived on November 2, 2010.

=== Cleveland Browns ===
The Cleveland Browns signed Alexander on November 23, 2010. He was waived on July 28, 2011.
