= Brandon McGowan =

American football player (born 1983)

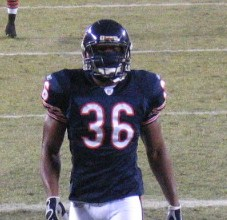
- McGowan during a 2005 Chicago Bears game

No. 36, 30
- Position: Safety

Personal information
- Born: September 16, 1983 (age 43); Jersey City, New Jersey, U.S.
- Listed height: 5 ft 11 in (1.80 m)
- Listed weight: 207 lb (94 kg)

Career information
- High school: Lincoln (Jersey City)
- College: Maine
- NFL draft: 2005: undrafted

Career history
- Chicago Bears (2005–2008); New England Patriots (2009–2010)

Awards and highlights
- First-team All-A-10 (2004); Second-team All-A-10 (2003)

Career NFL statistics
- Total tackles: 191
- Forced fumbles: 4
- Fumble recoveries: 3
- Pass deflections: 8
- Interceptions: 2
- Stats at Pro Football Reference

Brandon McGowan (born September 16, 1983) is an American former professional football player who was a safety in the National Football League (NFL). He was signed by the Chicago Bears as an undrafted free agent in 2005. He played college football for the Maine Black Bears.

== Early life ==
McGowan attended Lincoln High School in Jersey City, New Jersey, where he played football as a safety and running back. He was a defensive first-team All-County selection as a senior.

== College career ==
McGowan was a four-year letterwinner with the Maine Black Bears finishing his college career with 700 tackles, 7.5 sacks, 25 interceptions, 15 forced fumbles, and 15 fumble recoveries. He started 33 of the 34 games he played at Maine and was the team's Defensive Player of the Year and an All-Atlantic 10 Conference selection as a junior in 2003. He was also awarded the "Hammer Award" for being the Black Bears' best special teams player as a freshman in 2001.

== Professional career ==
=== Chicago Bears ===
McGowan went undrafted in the 2005 NFL draft and signed a three-year deal with the Chicago Bears. McGowan was the only undrafted rookie to make the Bears' roster. During his rookie season, McGowan played in 16 games, starting the final three games of the season, and completed the year with 23 tackles and four special teams tackles. McGowan recorded a career-high eight tackles against the Pittsburgh Steelers on December 11.

McGowan missed the first seven games of the 2006 season after beginning the year on the team's Physically Unable to Perform list. He recorded two special teams tackles in his first game back against the Miami Dolphins before being placed on injured reserve with an Achilles injury the next day.

In 2007, McGowan replaced starting safety Adam Archuleta for most of the season and finished the year with 80 tackles and 2 interceptions. He also had a career-high 10 special teams tackles. However, McGowan lost out on the starting strong safety job to Kevin Payne during the 2008 preseason. On September 17, McGowan was placed on season-ending injured reserve with an ankle injury. In March 2009, McGowan became a free agent, after the Bears planned on using Payne as their starter for next year.

=== New England Patriots ===
On May 5, 2009, McGowan signed with the New England Patriots. He began the season as a reserve behind starters Brandon Meriweather and James Sanders; however, before the opener, Belichick praised McGowan:

Brandon's done a good job for us. I thought that he was a good player for Chicago, and had a good career at Maine obviously. But a good career in Chicago but unfortunately missed some time. When he did play he played very well. He's a tough kid, he really is a good contact player with good speed, good range, he's instinctive. He makes plays in the kicking game; he's made plays on defense and both in the running game and in the passing game. Both in this preseason, and he made them with the Bears. So, I think he's a versatile player that brings a good competitive attitude and toughness to our team and to that position along with several other guys we have there, but that's something that we liked, and he's shown all that. I'm glad we have him.

In Week 2, McGowan started over Sanders against the New York Jets, and continued to do so until Week 14. He played as a reserve to Sanders in the final four games of the season and the Patriots' playoff loss to the Baltimore Ravens. He finished the season with 79 tackles and three forced fumbles.

McGowan was placed on injured reserve by the Patriots on September 4, 2010, with a chest injury, ending his season. He was released by the Patriots on August 7, 2011.

== NFL career statistics ==
Legend
**Bold**	Career high

=== Regular season ===
Year	Team	Games		Tackles					Interceptions					Fumbles			
Year	Team	GP	GS	Cmb	Solo	Ast	Sck	TFL	Int	Yds	TD	Lng	PD	FF	FR	Yds	TD
2005	CHI	8	3	39	31	8	0.0	**6**	0	0	0	0	1	0	0	0	0
2006	CHI	1	0	2	1	1	0.0	0	0	0	0	0	0	0	0	0	0
2007	CHI	14	9	68	**58**	10	0.0	0	**2**	**5**	0	**5**	**3**	1	1	0	0
2008	CHI	2	1	4	2	2	0.0	0	0	0	0	0	1	0	0	0	0
2009	NWE	**16**	**11**	**78**	**58**	**20**	0.0	3	0	0	0	0	**3**	**3**	**2**	0	0
		41	24	191	150	41	0.0	9	2	5	0	5	8	4	3	0	0

=== Playoffs ===
Year	Team	Games		Tackles					Interceptions					Fumbles			
Year	Team	GP	GS	Cmb	Solo	Ast	Sck	TFL	Int	Yds	TD	Lng	PD	FF	FR	Yds	TD
2009	NWE	**1**	0	**2**	**2**	0	0.0	0	0	0	0	0	0	0	0	0	0
		1	0	2	2	0	0.0	0	0	0	0	0	0	0	0	0	0
