= Rob Myers =

American football player (born 1986)

No. 86, 87
- Position: Tight end

Personal information
- Born: April 9, 1986 (age 40); Dallas, Texas, U.S.
- Listed height: 6 ft 4 in (1.93 m)
- Listed weight: 240 lb (109 kg)

Career information
- College: Utah State
- NFL draft: 2009: undrafted

Career history
- New York Jets (2009)*; Philadelphia Eagles (2009)*; New England Patriots (2009–2010)*; Buffalo Bills (2010)*; Indianapolis Colts (2010–2011)*; Washington Redskins (2011)
- * Offseason or practice squad member only
- Stats at Pro Football Reference

Rob Myers (born April 9, 1986) is an American former professional football player who was a tight end in the National Football League (NFL). He played college football for the Utah State Aggies and was signed by the New York Jets as an undrafted free agent in 2009.

Myers was a member of the Philadelphia Eagles, New England Patriots, Buffalo Bills, Washington Redskins and Indianapolis Colts.

== Early life ==
Myers was born in Dallas, Texas and attended Bellaire High School in Bellaire, Texas. He lettered in football as a wide receiver three times, and lacrosse twice.

== College career ==
Myers played college football for the Utah State Aggies. He was redshirted his first year and played in eight games his freshman year on special teams. Myers had a groin injury during the preseason of his sophomore year, but managed to come back to make 10 catches for 125 yards. He was named the John Mackey tight end of the Week on November 21, 2007 after catching four passes for 117 yards and two touchdowns. He also had a career-long 37-yard pass reception. In his junior year, he played in all 12 games with four starts, and had 21 receptions for 320 yards, which ranked second on the team in both yards and receptions. He also led all tight ends nationally with a 15.2 yards per catch average. Myers was named to the All-Western Athletic Conference team in the preseason of his senior year, but suffered a turf toe injury that required surgery that caused him to miss the entire year.

In his career, he made 31 catches for 445 yards and three touchdowns.

== Professional career ==
=== New York Jets ===
After not being selected in the 2009 NFL draft, Myers signed with the New York Jets as an undrafted free agent. He was waived on May 29.

=== Philadelphia Eagles ===
Due to injuries to backups Cornelius Ingram and Matt Schobel, Myers was signed by the Philadelphia Eagles on August 8, 2009. He was waived on September 5, 2009. He was re-signed to the team's practice squad on September 6. He was released from the practice squad on September 24.

=== New England Patriots ===
Myers was signed to the practice squad of the New England Patriots on November 3, 2009. After spending the entire season on the practice squad, he was re-signed to a future contract on January 12, 2010. He was waived on September 3.

=== Buffalo Bills ===
Myers was signed to the Buffalo Bills' practice squad on September 13, 2010. He was released on October 1.

=== Indianapolis Colts ===
Myers was signed to the Indianapolis Colts' practice squad on October 27, 2010. He was re-signed to the team's active roster following the season, but was placed on injured reserve after suffering an injury during training camp. He was waived with an injury settlement on August 24, 2011.

=== Washington Redskins ===
The Washington Redskins signed Myers to the team's practice squad on November 17, 2011, and he was released on December 18. He was re-signed to the practice squad the following day on December 19 and promoted to the active roster on December 20. Myers had his NFL debut in Week 17 against the Philadelphia Eagles.

The Redskins waived Myers on May 14, 2012.
