= Adrian Grady =

American football player (born 1985)

No. 90
- Position: Defensive tackle

Personal information
- Born: November 21, 1985 (age 40); Nicholls, Georgia, U.S.
- Listed height: 6 ft 1 in (1.85 m)
- Listed weight: 290 lb (132 kg)

Career information
- College: Louisville
- NFL draft: 2009: undrafted

Career history
- Indianapolis Colts (2009)*; New England Patriots (2009)*; St. Louis Rams (2009)*; New England Patriots (2009-2010)*; Hartford Colonials (2010)
- * Offseason or practice squad member only
- Stats at Pro Football Reference

Adrian Grady (born November 21, 1985) is an American former professional football defensive lineman. He was signed as an undrafted free agent by the Indianapolis Colts in 2009. He played college football at Louisville.

He was also a member of the New England Patriots, St. Louis Rams and Hartford Colonials.

== Early life ==
Grady attended Coffee High School in Douglas, Georgia, where he played football as a defensive lineman and linebacker. He recorded 85 tackles as a sophomore defensive lineman before switching to linebacker as a junior; he missed the season with a leg injury. As a senior, he recorded 69 tackles and two sacks, earning second-team all-region honors.

== College career ==
After graduating high school, Grady attended the University of Louisville, where started two of the 12 games he played in as a true freshman in 2005. He played in eight games as a sophomore, starting two, picking up 16 tackles before suffering an injury. As a junior in 2007, Grady played in five games before suffering a season-ending injury. As a senior in 2008, he started 10 of 11 games, recording 41 tackles and two sacks.

== Professional career ==
=== Indianapolis Colts ===
Grady was signed by the Indianapolis Colts after going undrafted in the 2009 NFL draft. He was waived by the Colts on September 5 during final cuts.

=== New England Patriots (first stint) ===
Grady was signed to the practice squad of the New England Patriots on September 6, 2009. He was released by the Patriots on September 30.

=== St. Louis Rams ===
Grady was signed to the practice squad of the St. Louis Rams on October 7, 2009. He was released on October 12.

=== New England Patriots (second stint) ===
Grady was re-signed to the practice squad of the Patriots on November 17, 2009. He spent the remainder of the season on the practice squad and was re-signed to a future contract on January 12, 2010. He was waived by the Patriots on August 9, 2010.
