= Nathan Hodel =

American football player (born 1977)

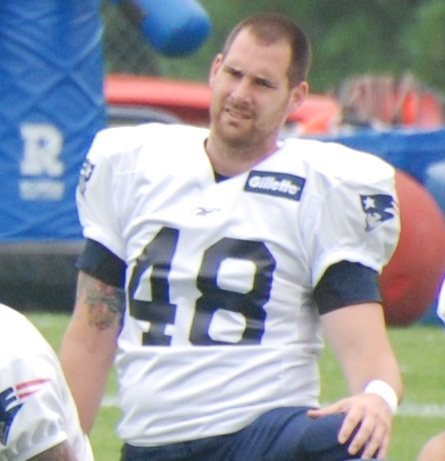
- Hodel with the Patriots in 2009

No. 48, 58
- Positions: Long snapper, tight end

Personal information
- Born: November 12, 1977 (age 48); Fairview Heights, Illinois, U.S.
- Listed height: 6 ft 2 in (1.88 m)
- Listed weight: 238 lb (108 kg)

Career information
- High school: Belleville East (Belleville, Illinois)
- College: Illinois
- NFL draft: 2001: undrafted

Career history
- Carolina Panthers (2001)*; Arizona Cardinals (2001–2008); New England Patriots (2009)*; Detroit Lions (2009)
- * Offseason or practice squad member only

Career NFL statistics
- Games played: 113
- Total tackles: 24
- Stats at Pro Football Reference

Nathan William Hodel (/ˈhoʊdəl/; born November 12, 1977) is an American former professional football player who was a long snapper in the National Football League (NFL). He played college football for the Illinois Fighting Illini and was signed by the Carolina Panthers as an undrafted free agent in 2001. Hodel was also a member of the Arizona Cardinals, New England Patriots and Detroit Lions. He finished his NFL career playing in 133 games. He is fifth in Cardinals history in consecutive games played at 132.

== Early life ==
Hodel attended Belleville East High School in Belleville, Illinois, and was a two-sport star in baseball and football. In football, he was the team captain and an All-Conference pick as an offensive lineman. In baseball, he was a pitcher, the team captain, an All-Conference pitcher, and an all-Illinois prep pitcher.

== College career ==
At the University of Illinois Urbana-Champaign, Hodel was a long snapper on the football team and a pitcher on the baseball team.

== Professional career ==
=== Carolina Panthers ===
After graduating from college in 2001, Hodel spent six games on the practice squad with the Carolina Panthers and was then released.

=== Arizona Cardinals ===
Hodel signed with the Arizona Cardinals shortly after his release by the Panthers and spent the next nine games on their practice squad. He was activated to the Cardinals' 53-man roster for the last two games of the 2001 season but did not enter a game. He handled long snapping duties with the Cardinals from 2002 to 2008.

Hodel was released by the Cardinals on February 26, 2009.

=== New England Patriots ===
Hodel was signed by the New England Patriots on March 10, 2009, after the team's previous long snapper, Lonie Paxton, signed with the Denver Broncos.

=== Detroit Lions ===
Hodel signed with the Detroit Lions on December 17, 2009, after an injury to Lions long snapper Don Muhlbach. The Lions waived Hodel on December 24. Hodel retired after the 2009 season and now lives with his family in Wauconda, Illinois.
