= Shawn Crable =

American gridiron football player (born 1984)

No. 98, 59
- Position: Linebacker / defensive end

Personal information
- Born: December 26, 1984 (age 41); Massillon, Ohio, U.S.
- Listed height: 6 ft 5 in (1.96 m)
- Listed weight: 241 lb (109 kg)

Career information
- High school: Massillon Washington
- College: Michigan
- NFL draft: 2008: 3rd round, 78th overall pick

Career history
- New England Patriots (2008–2010); New York Jets (2010)*; Sacramento Mountain Lions (2011); Hamilton Tiger-Cats (2012)
- * Offseason or practice squad member only

Awards and highlights
- Second-team All-American (2007); 2× Second-team All-Big Ten (2006, 2007)

Career NFL statistics
- Total tackles: 4
- Sacks: 0.5
- Stats at Pro Football Reference
- Stats at CFL.ca (archive)

Shawn Crable (born December 26, 1984) is an American former professional football player who was a linebacker in the National Football League (NFL). He played college football for the Michigan Wolverines and was selected by the New England Patriots in the third round of the 2008 NFL draft.

Crable was also a member of the New York Jets, Sacramento Mountain Lions and Hamilton Tiger-Cats.

== Early life ==
Crable attended Washington High School and was a three-year letterman. As a senior, he made 75 tackles, 17 sacks, three forced fumbles and two interceptions and was a First-team All-State selection. He was also named to the roster of the 2003 U.S. Army All-American Bowl. He had 125 tackles, six sacks, 19 tackles for a loss and two interceptions as a junior. Additionally, he was a four-year letterman in basketball and three-year letterman in track and field.

== College career ==
Crable was a four-year letterman at the University of Michigan and was the team captain and Second-team All-American as a senior. As a freshman in 2003 was injured and missed entire season. In 2004, he played in nine games and contributed seven tackles, one tackle for loss, one sack and two pass breakups. In 2005, he played in and had 14 tackles, three tackles for loss, three sacks and three pass breakups. In 2006, he was Second-team All-Big Ten after starting eight games at outside linebacker (playing in all 13). He totaled 37 tackles with 10.5 tackles for loss and 4.5 sacks as well as three pass breakups, two forced fumbles and a fumble recovery. In 2007, he played in all 13 games and made 12 starts at outside linebacker and made 90 tackles with 28.5 tackles for a loss (TLFs). He also forced four fumbles and had one fumble recovery and one pass breakup. He was named second-team All-Big Ten Conference for the second consecutive season. His 28.5 TFLs led the Big Ten Conference, and it ranked second in the nation to George Selvie. Crable was apart of the 2007 Michigan Wolverine football team that loss the Season Opener at home to Appalachian State.

== Professional career ==
Pre-draft measurables
Height	Weight	Arm length	Hand span	40-yard dash	10-yard split	20-yard split	20-yard shuttle	Three-cone drill	Vertical jump	Broad jump	Bench press
6 ft 4 7/8 in (1.95 m)	241 lb (109 kg)	34 5/8 in (0.88 m)	10 3/8 in (0.26 m)	4.64 s	1.60 s	2.71 s	4.55 s	7.29 s	28.0 in (0.71 m)	9 ft 3 in (2.82 m)	29 reps
All values from NFL Scouting Combine

=== New England Patriots ===
Crable was selected by the New England Patriots in the third round (78th overall) of the 2008 NFL draft. Crable was inactive for the first half of 2008 and was placed injured reserve with a shin injury on November 5, 2008. He was placed on injured reserve on September 5, 2009 with a groin injury. He was released by the team on July 28, 2010, one day after being placed on the active/physically unable to perform list entering training camp. He was re-signed to the Patriots' practice squad on September 5, 2010. On September 25, 2010, Crable was promoted to the 53-man roster. He played in six games, recording four tackles and a half sack before being waived on November 16, 2010.

=== New York Jets ===
The New York Jets signed Crable to their practice squad on November 19, 2010.

=== Sacramento Mountain Lions ===
Crable was signed by the Sacramento Mountain Lions of the United Football League on August 29, 2011.

=== Hamilton Tiger-Cats ===
The Hamilton Tiger-Cats signed Crable on April 7, 2012. He was released soon after on May 17, 2012.
