= Eric Kettani =

American football player (born 1987)

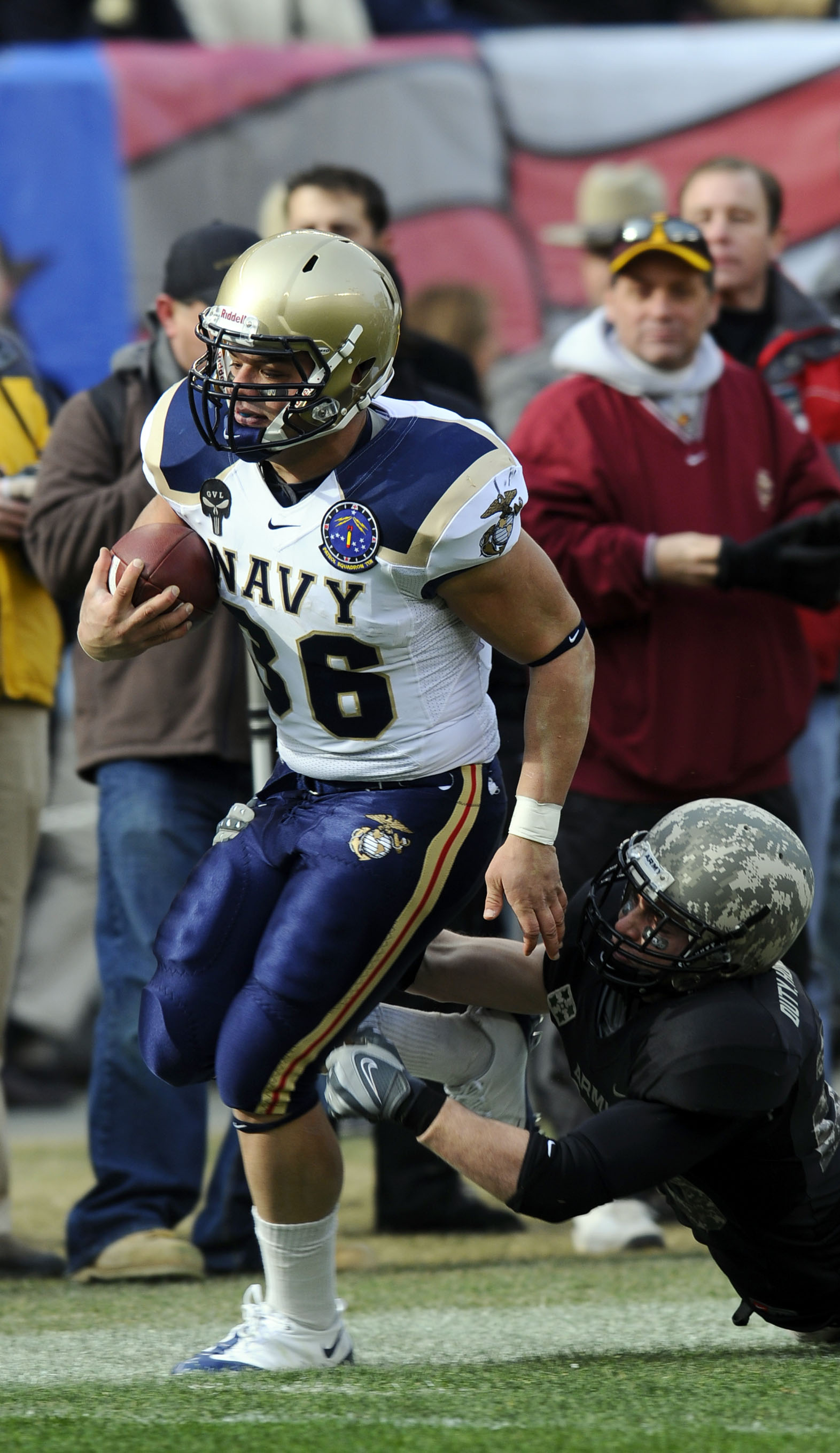
- Kettani escapes a defender in the 2008 Army–Navy Game

No. 34, 36, 44
- Position: Fullback

Personal information
- Born: March 26, 1987 (age 39); Kirtland, Ohio, U.S.
- Listed height: 5 ft 11 in (1.80 m)
- Listed weight: 235 lb (107 kg)

Career information
- High school: Lake Catholic (Mentor, Ohio)
- College: Navy
- NFL draft: 2009: undrafted

Career history
- New England Patriots (2009−2011); Washington Redskins (2012−2013)*; Kansas City Chiefs (2013−2014)*; Jacksonville Jaguars (2014)*; New England Patriots (2015)*
- * Offseason or practice squad member only
- Stats at Pro Football Reference

Eric Kettani (born March 26, 1987) is an American former professional football fullback of Algerian origin. He played college football for the Navy Midshipmen. He signed with the New England Patriots of the National Football League (NFL) as an undrafted free agent in 2009.

== Early life ==
Kettani grew up in Kirtland, Ohio and attended High School in nearby Mentor, Ohio at Lake Catholic High School. At Lake Catholic, Kettani was a three-year letter winner in football and was the News-Herald Player of the Year and the Cleveland Plain-Dealer Defensive Player of the Year as a senior, he was also named First-team All-Northeast Ohio and earned all-state honors.

== College career ==
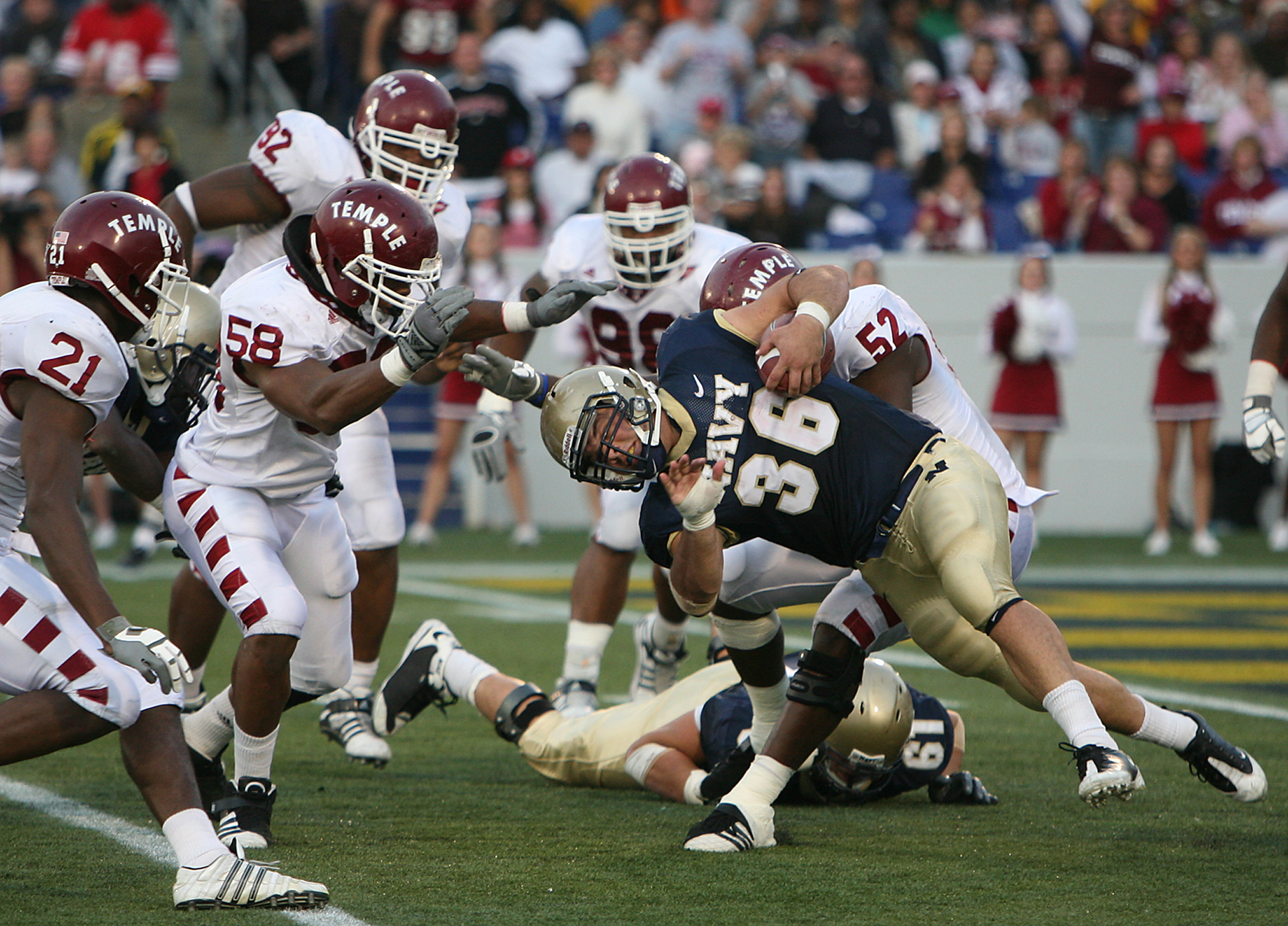
Kettani is tackled during a 2008 game against Temple

Kettani attended the United States Naval Academy and graduated in 2009. He played for the Navy Midshipmen football team from 2006 to 2009. In his last three seasons with the Midshipmen, Kettani rushed 395 times for 2,091 yards, a 5.3-yards-per-carry average, and scored 15 rushing touchdowns.

== Professional career ==
=== New England Patriots (first stint) ===
The New England Patriots signed Kettani as an undrafted free agent following the 2009 NFL draft, he was later placed on the Reserve/Military list. In 2011, he was signed to the Patriots' practice squad, however he was recalled to the Navy.

On February 14, 2012, Kettani re-signed with the Patriots. He was released on August 31 for final roster cuts before the start of the 2012 season, but signed to the team's practice squad again. He was released on September 4.

=== Washington Redskins ===
Kettani signed with the practice squad of the Washington Redskins on September 11, 2012.

He was signed to reserve contract on January 8, 2013. On August 26, 2013, he was waived by the Redskins.

=== Kansas City Chiefs ===
Kettani signed with the Kansas City Chiefs' practice squad on December 24, 2013. The Chiefs released him on May 12, 2014.

=== Jacksonville Jaguars ===
Kettani was signed to the Jacksonville Jaguars practice squad on September 23, 2014. He became a free agent after the 2014 season.

=== New England Patriots (second stint) ===
On August 4, 2015, Kettani's agent announced that he had re-signed with the Patriots. The Patriots released Kettani on August 24, 2015.

== Military career ==
After serving three years under the United States Navy, Kettani negotiated a deal with the Department of Defense to allow him to serve seven years in the Naval reserves doing public-affairs work while simultaneously pursuing a career in the NFL in 2012. On June 3, 2013, he was promoted to the rank of lieutenant from his previous rank of lieutenant junior grade. He had his pinning ceremony at Redskins Park, where head coach Mike Shanahan and running back coach Bobby Turner were chosen to help pin Kettani's new lieutenant bars on his uniform, along with his father.

He initially served his Navy Reserve obligations at the Pentagon for the Chief of Naval Information (CHINFO) where he served as a Public Affairs Officer until May 2015. Served at Navy Community Outreach (NAVCO) in Millington, Tennessee. as a Public Affairs Officer and performs other duties at the Naval Academy, where he was a student. LT Kettani last served at NTAG Ohio River Valley Recruiting District (TAOC Cleveland).
