= Shun White =

American football player (born 1985)

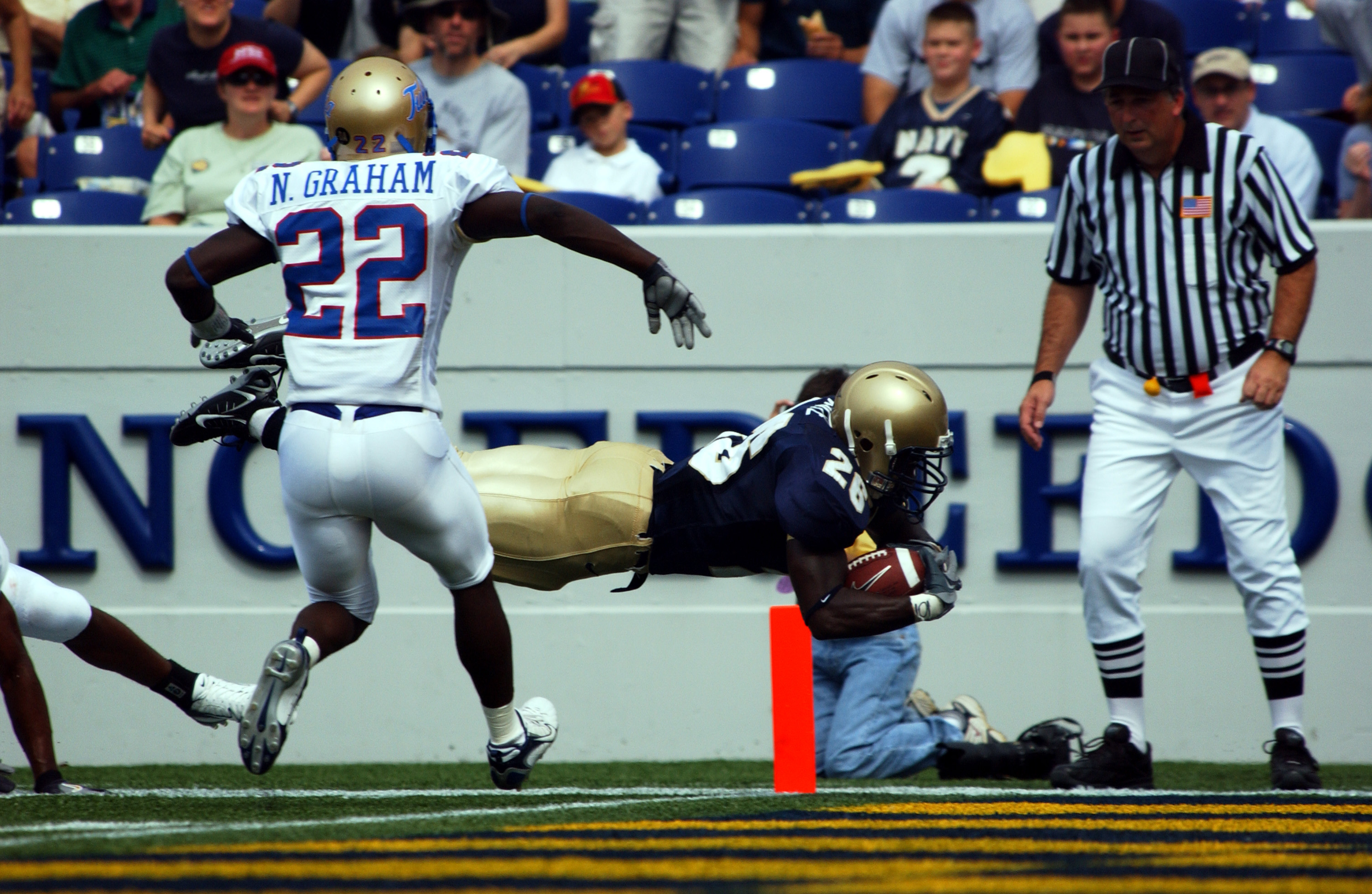
- White scoring a touchdown in a 2006 game against the Tulsa Golden Hurricane

Profile
- Position: Wide receiver

Personal information
- Born: December 9, 1985 (age 40); Memphis, Tennessee
- Listed height: 5 ft 9 in (1.75 m)
- Listed weight: 190 lb (86 kg)

Career information
- High school: Memphis (TN) Raleigh-Egypt
- College: Navy
- NFL draft: 2009: undrafted

Career history
- New England Patriots (2009–2012)
- Stats at Pro Football Reference

Shun White (born December 9, 1985) is a former American football wide receiver. White was born in Memphis, Tennessee, and lived there through High School where he attended Raleigh-Egypt High School.

== Early life ==
White attended Raleigh-Egypt High School in Memphis, where he starred on the football team as a running back in addition to winning the 100 meter state title in track. He was recruited by programs such as Ole Miss and Wake Forest, though they wanted to convert him into a cornerback, so he ultimately committed to play college football at Navy after head coach Paul Johnson offered him the chance to play the triple option.

On August 31, 2007, White's jersey was retired by Raleigh-Egypt High School.

== College career ==
During college, he played for Navy where he played running back, White was Navy's sixth leading rusher of all time, he ran for a career-high 1,092 yards during his senior season in 2008 and set a Navy record when he rushed for 348 yards in a single game against Towson.

White was the 200-meter champion and finished second in the 100-meter dash at the Patriot League Outdoor Track & Field Championship, he holds the school record in the 60-meter dash with a time of 6.87 seconds.

== Professional career ==
The New England Patriots signed White as an undrafted free agent following the 2009 NFL Draft, and he was later placed on the Reserve/Military list. White was released on March 28, 2013.

== Personal life ==
White is the son of Vera and George White. His father was a star running back at then-segregated Manassas High School in Memphis in the 1960s.

== See also ==
- List of college football yearly rushing leaders
