= Nigel Bradham =

American football player (born 1989)

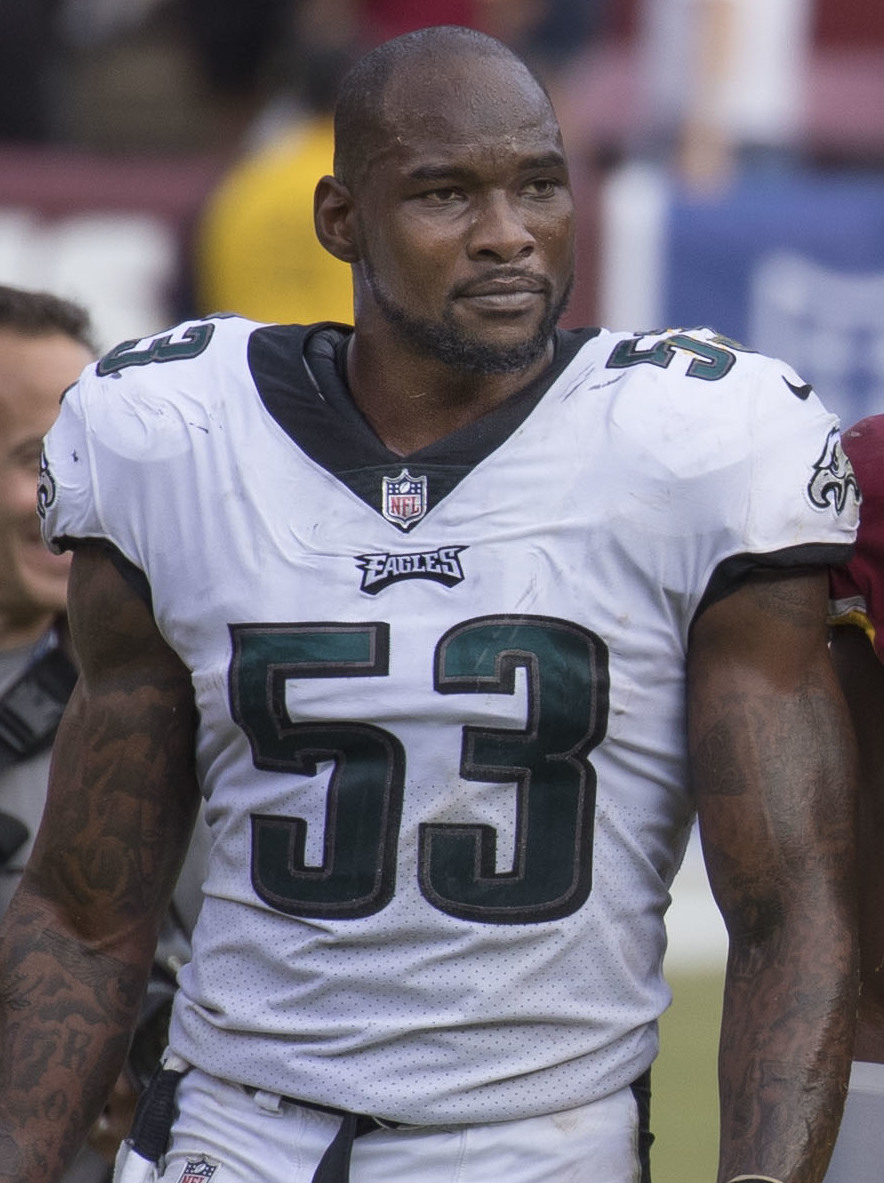
- Bradham with the Philadelphia Eagles in 2017

No. 53, 51
- Position: Linebacker

Personal information
- Born: September 4, 1989 (age 37); Crawfordville, Florida, U.S.
- Listed height: 6 ft 2 in (1.88 m)
- Listed weight: 241 lb (109 kg)

Career information
- High school: Wakulla (Crawfordville)
- College: Florida State (2008–2011)
- NFL draft: 2012: 4th round, 105th overall pick

Career history
- Buffalo Bills (2012–2015); Philadelphia Eagles (2016–2019); New Orleans Saints (2020)*; Denver Broncos (2020)
- * Offseason or practice squad member only

Awards and highlights
- Super Bowl champion (LII)

Career NFL statistics
- Total tackles: 619
- Sacks: 8.5
- Forced fumbles: 5
- Fumble recoveries: 5
- Interceptions: 3
- Defensive touchdowns: 2
- Stats at Pro Football Reference

Nigel Bradham (born September 4, 1989) is an American former professional football player who was a linebacker in the National Football League (NFL). He played college football for the Florida State Seminoles. He was selected by the Buffalo Bills in the fourth round of the 2012 NFL draft, and played for the Philadelphia Eagles from 2016 to 2019.

== Early life ==
At Wakulla High School, Bradham had consecutive 145-tackle seasons, including a senior campaign in which he also registered 12 sacks and four defensive touchdowns in leading Wakulla to a district championship and a first-round playoff berth, where they lost 13–8 to Panama City Beach Arnold. As a junior, he tallied 145 tackles, eight sacks, and four interceptions, two of which he returned for TDs. Bradham recorded over 430 tackles and 20 sacks during his four-year career on the varsity football team at Wakulla.

Bradham was named to All-American teams by Parade, SuperPrep, and USA Today, among others. He was a finalist for the Hall Trophy and recorded four tackles in the 2008 U.S. Army All-American Bowl. Considered a five-star recruit and the ranked first among outside linebacker prospects by Rivals.com, Bradham had numerous scholarship offers but decided to attend Florida State University early in April 2007. He was the highest rated prospect of the Seminoles' 2008 recruiting class.

== College career ==
As a true freshman in 2008, Bradham was in the linebacker rotation from opening day and played in each of the Seminoles' 13 games during the regular season, mostly at weakside linebacker. He made his first career start in the Seminoles' victory over the University of Miami. Bradham finished the season as fourth-leading tackler among the Seminoles' linebackers and Florida State's leading true freshmen tackler with 29 stops.

In his sophomore year, Bradham had 12 starts and led the Seminoles with 93 tackles (62 unassisted). He also recorded 5.5 tackles for loss, two sacks, one interception and finished second on the team with two fumble recoveries. Bradham earned honorable mention Sophomore All-American honors from College Football News.

Starting all 14 games at weakside linebacker, Bradham led the Seminoles in tackling for a second consecutive season, totalling 98 tackles (54 solos), including 5.5 tackles for loss. He also added five sacks, which ranked third on FSU's nation-leading sack unit behind Brandon Jenkins and Markus White, as well as a single-season high five passes defended, to go along with a forced fumble. Bradham recorded a season-high of ten tackles twice, against Boston College and North Carolina, with six solo stops in each game.

As a senior, Bradham was named team captain. He registered 86 tackles, which led the Seminoles for the third consecutive season, and earned All-ACC honorable mention. FSU ranked as the No. 4 defense nationally. Bradham finished his career with 39 starts, including his last 37 games.

== Professional career ==
External videos
- Nigel Bradham's NFL Combine Workout

Pre-draft measurables
Height	Weight	Arm length	Hand span	40-yard dash	10-yard split	20-yard split	20-yard shuttle	Three-cone drill	Vertical jump	Broad jump	Bench press
6 ft 1 7/8 in (1.88 m)	241 lb (109 kg)	33 3/4 in (0.86 m)	10 1/2 in (0.27 m)	4.64 s	1.69 s	2.74 s	4.37 s	7.18 s	37 in (0.94 m)	10 ft 1 in (3.07 m)	24 reps
All values from NFL Combine

=== Buffalo Bills ===
==== 2012 ====
The Buffalo Bills selected Bradham in the fourth round (105th overall) of the 2012 NFL draft. Bradham was the 12th linebacker drafted in 2012.

On May 10, 2012, the Bills signed Bradham to a four-year, $2.56 million contract that includes a signing bonus of $462,551.

Bradham began training camp competing for a roster spot as a linebacker against Arthur Moats, Chris White, Tank Carder, Bryan Scott, and Danny Batten. He performed well enough during camp to earn an opportunity to compete against Arthur Moats for the job as the starting strongside linebacker. Head coach Chan Gailey named Bradham the backup strongside linebacker to begin the regular season, behind Arthur Moats.

He made his professional regular season debut in the Buffalo Bills' season-opening 48–28 loss at the New York Jets. The following week, he collected three combined tackles in the Bills' 35–17 victory against the Kansas City Chiefs in Week 2. Bradham made his first career tackle on Javier Arenas during Arenas' 23-yard punt return in the third quarter. In Week 6, Bradham earned his first career start after he surpassed Arthur Moats on the depth chart and became the starting strongside linebacker. He finished the Bills' 19–16 victory at the Arizona Cardinals with three combined tackles. On December 30, 2012, Bradham recorded a season-high 11 combined tackles (five solo) during a 28–9 victory against the New York Jets in Week 17. On December 31, 2012, it was announced that the Buffalo Bills decided to fire head coach Chan Gailey after they did not qualify for the playoffs and finished with a 6–10 record. Bradham finished his rookie season in 2012 with 57 combined tackles (37 solo) and a pass deflection in 16 games and 11 starts.

==== 2013 ====
Throughout training camp, Bradham competed to be the starting middle linebacker after Kelvin Sheppard was traded to the Indianapolis Colts. He competed against rookie Kiko Alonso, Arthur Moats, and Bryan Scott. Head coach Doug Marrone named Bradham the backup outside linebacker to start the regular season, behind starters Arthur Moats and Manny Lawson.

On December 8, 2013, Bradham earned his first start of the season and recorded six combined tackles during a 27–6 loss at the Tampa Bay Buccaneers in Week 14. He reverted to his role as a backup behind Arthur Moats the following week. In Week 17, Bradham collected a season-high ten combined tackles (four solo) during a 34–20 loss at the New England Patriots. He finished the 2013 season with 51 combined tackles (29 solo) and a pass deflection in 16 games and two starts.

==== 2014 ====
Bradham entered training camp slated as the starting weakside linebacker. He received the opportunity to become the starter after Kiko Alonso tore his ACL during organized team activities, Arthur Moats departed in for the Pittsburgh Steelers in free agency, and Manny Lawson was moved to defensive end. On July 30, 2014, Bradham received a one-game suspension stemming from his marijuana possession charge he received in August 2013 (see personal life). Head coach Doug Marrone officially named him the starting weakside linebacker to start the regular season, alongside starting strongside linebacker Keith Rivers and middle linebacker Brandon Spikes.

On September 21, 2014, Bradham collected a season-high 12 combined tackles (four solo) during a 22–10 loss to the San Diego Chargers in Week 3. In Week 4, he recorded four combined tackles, a pass deflection, made his first career interception, and 1.5 sacks in the Bills' 23–17 loss at the Houston Texans. Bradham made his first career sack on former teammate Ryan Fitzpatrick for a three-yard loss in the first quarter and intercepted a pass originally intended for running back Arian Foster by Ryan Fitzpatrick in the third quarter. He injured his knee while making the interception in the third quarter and missed the remainder of the game. The injury sidelined Bradham for the Bills' Week 5 victory at the Detroit Lions. In Week 13, Bradham recorded a season-high ten solo tackles and assisted on a tackle during a 43–23 victory at the New York Jets. On November 30, 2014, he tied his season-high of 12 combined tackles (nine solo), deflected a pass, and recorded a sack in the Bills' 26–10 win against the Cleveland Browns in Week 13. Bradham finished the 2014 season with a career-high 104 combined tackles (66 solo), six pass deflections, 2.5 sacks, and an interception in 14 games and 14 starts.

==== 2015 ====
On January 1, 2015, it was announced that head coach Doug Marrone opted to exercise a clause in his contract and resign from his role after finishing with a 9–7 record in 2014. The Buffalo Bills new defensive coordinator, Dennis Thurman, opted to use a 3-4 defense instead of the base 4-3 defense previously used by Jim Schwartz with Bradham slated as the starting inside linebacker. Head coach Rex Ryan officially named Bradham and Preston Brown the starting inside linebackers to start the regular season.

He started in the Buffalo Bills' season-opener against the Indianapolis Colts and recorded a season-high eight combined tackles and sacked quarterback Andrew Luck in their 27–14 victory. On October 4, 2015, Bradham tied his season-high of eight combined tackles and broke up a pass during a 24–10 loss to the New York Giants in Week 4. On November 29, 2015, he recorded four solo tackles before exiting the Bills' 30–22 loss at the Kansas City Chiefs due to an ankle injury. He was diagnosed with a high ankle sprain and was sidelined for the last five games of the season (Weeks 13–17). Bradham finished the 2015 season with 59 combined tackles (42 solo), three pass deflections, and a sack in 11 games and 11 starts. He received an overall grade of 39.2 from Pro Football Focus, which was the 79th best overall grade among all qualifying linebackers in 2015.

Bradham became an unrestricted free agent after 2015 and received interest from multiple teams, including the Philadelphia Eagles, Tampa Bay Buccaneers, Cleveland Browns, and Jacksonville Jaguars. He stated he hoped to return to Buffalo and continue his career where he started. Bradham also claimed he would accept a one-year "prove it" deal if that was the only option. Bradham and the Buffalo Bills were ultimately unable to come to an agreement with the Bills ending contract talks.

=== Philadelphia Eagles ===
==== 2016 ====
On March 9, 2016, the Philadelphia Eagles signed Bradham to a two-year, $7 million contract with $4.5 million guaranteed and a signing bonus of $1.5 million. His free agent signing reunited him with defensive coordinator Jim Schwartz who he played under in 2014.

Bradham entered training camp slated as the starting strongside linebacker. Head coach Doug Pederson officially named Bradham the starting strongside linebacker to begin the regular season, along with weakside linebacker Mychal Kendricks and middle linebacker Jordan Hicks.

In Week 2, Bradham made one tackle, a pass deflection, and intercepted a pass by Jay Cutler during a 29–14 victory at the Chicago Bears. The interception marked his second pick of his career. On October 23, 2016, he made seven combined tackles, broke up a pass, and sacked quarterback Sam Bradford in the Eagles' 21–10 win against the Minnesota Vikings in Week 7. It marked his first sack as a member as the Philadelphia Eagles. On December 22, 2016, Bradham collected a season-high 14 combined tackles (ten solo) during a 24–19 win against the New York Giants in Week 16. He finished his first season with the Eagles with 102 combined tackles (69 solo), five pass deflections, two sacks, two forced fumbles, and an interception in 16 games and 16 starts. Pro Football Focus gave Bradham an overall grade of 86.5, which ranked ninth among all qualifying linebackers in 2016.

==== 2017 ====
Defensive coordinator Jim Schwartz retained Bradham, Kendricks, and Hicks as the starting linebackers to start the 2017 regular season. In Week 6, Bradham recorded ten combined tackles (seven solo) and a season-high two pass deflections in the Eagles' 28–23 victory at the Carolina Panthers. On December 17, 2017, Bradham made a season-high 11 combined tackles (eight solo) and two pass deflections during a 34–29 win at the New York Giants in Week 15. Head coach Doug Pederson opted to rest Bradham for the Eagles' Week 17 loss to the Dallas Cowboys. He finished the 2017 season with 88 combined tackles (61 solo), a career-high eight pass deflections, and two sacks in 15 games and 15 starts. Pro Football Focus gave Bradham an overall grade of 80.6, which ranked 21st among all qualifying linebackers in 2017.

The Philadelphia Eagles finished the season atop the NFC East with a 13–3 record, clinching home-field advantage and a first round bye. On January 13, 2018, Bradham started in his first career playoff game and recorded four combined tackles, a pass deflection, and sacked quarterback Matt Ryan during a 15–10 victory against the Atlanta Falcons in the NFC Divisional Round. The Philadelphia Eagles reached Super Bowl LII after defeating the Minnesota Vikings 38–7 in the NFC Championship Game. On February 4, 2018, Bradham started in Super Bowl LII and recorded seven combined tackles in the Eagles' 41–33 victory over the New England Patriots.

==== 2018 ====
On March 14, 2018, the Philadelphia Eagles signed Bradham to a five-year, $40 million contract that included $14 million guaranteed and a signing bonus of $5 million. On June 29, 2018, Bradham was suspended for the first game of the season for violating the NFL's personal conduct policy from a battery/aggravated assault incident in July 2016.

==== 2019 ====
In the Eagles' Week 4 Thursday Night Football game against the Green Bay Packers, Bradham intercepted quarterback Aaron Rodgers to seal a 34–27 win over the Packers. In the Eagles' week 15 game against the Washington Redskins, Bradham returned a fumble lost by Dwayne Haskins for a 46-yard touchdown in the closing seconds of the 37–27 win.

On February 18, 2020, the Eagles declined the option on Bradham's contract, and released him the next day.

=== New Orleans Saints ===
On August 7, 2020, Bradham was signed by the New Orleans Saints. He was released on August 24, 2020.

=== Denver Broncos ===
On October 5, 2020, the Denver Broncos signed Bradham to their practice squad. He was elevated to the active roster on October 24 for the team's week 7 game against the Kansas City Chiefs, and reverted to the practice squad after the game. Bradham was released from the practice squad with a "left squad" designation on November 18, 2020.

== NFL career statistics ==
Year	Team	Games		Tackles				Fumbles				Interceptions					
Year	Team	G	GS	Comb	Total	Ast	Sack	FF	FR	Yds	TD	Int	Yds	Avg	Lng	TD	PD
2012	BUF	16	11	57	37	20	0.0	0	1	0	0	0	0	0	0	0	1
2013	BUF	16	2	51	29	22	0.0	0	0	0	0	0	0	0	0	0	1
2014	BUF	14	14	104	66	38	2.5	2	0	0	0	1	0	0	0	0	7
2015	BUF	11	11	59	42	17	1.0	0	0	0	0	0	0	0	0	0	3
2016	PHI	16	16	102	69	33	2.0	2	1	0	0	1	28	28	28	0	5
2017	PHI	15	15	88	61	27	1.0	1	1	37	1	0	0	0	0	0	8
2018	PHI	15	15	97	67	30	2.0	0	1	0	0	0	0	0	0	0	4
2019	PHI	12	12	61	32	29	0.0	0	1	48	1	1	22	22	22	0	5
2020	DEN	1	0	0	0	0	0.0	0	0	0	0	0	0	0	0	0	0
Career		116	96	619	403	216	8.5	5	5	85	2	3	50	16.7	28	0	34

== Personal life ==
Bradham has at least two children.

=== Legal issues ===
In August 2013, Bradham was given an appearance ticket for unlawful possession of marijuana in Tonawanda, New York. The charges were later dropped, provided Bradham would stay out of trouble for six months. On October 2, 2016, Bradham was arrested for bringing a loaded gun into Miami International Airport. Bradham was arrested in Miami on July 25, 2016 after officials say he got violent with a Hilton Bentley worker who was setting up a beach umbrella for the NFL player's group. Bradham has been formally charged with aggravated battery causing bodily harm—a 2nd degree felony. On November 13, 2021, Bradham was arrested after police found guns and over 3.45 pounds of marijuana in his car. He was released on bail the next day.

On October 10, 2024, Bradham was arrested in Tallahassee after it was discovered he was driving with a suspended license. The arrest occurred after he was pulled over for speeding. Bradham was charged with one felony count of driving while license suspended or revoked, but he was later released from prison. In addition, an arrest warrant against Bradham in Leon County, Florida on a controlled substance charge was discovered.
