= 2012 Buffalo Bills season =

53rd season in franchise history

- Owner: Ralph Wilson
- General manager: Buddy Nix
- Head coach: Chan Gailey
- Home stadium: Ralph Wilson Stadium

Results
- Record: 6–10
- Division place: 4th AFC East
- Playoffs: Did not qualify
- All-Pros: S Jairus Byrd
- Pro Bowlers: RB C. J. Spiller; DT Kyle Williams; S Jairus Byrd

Uniform
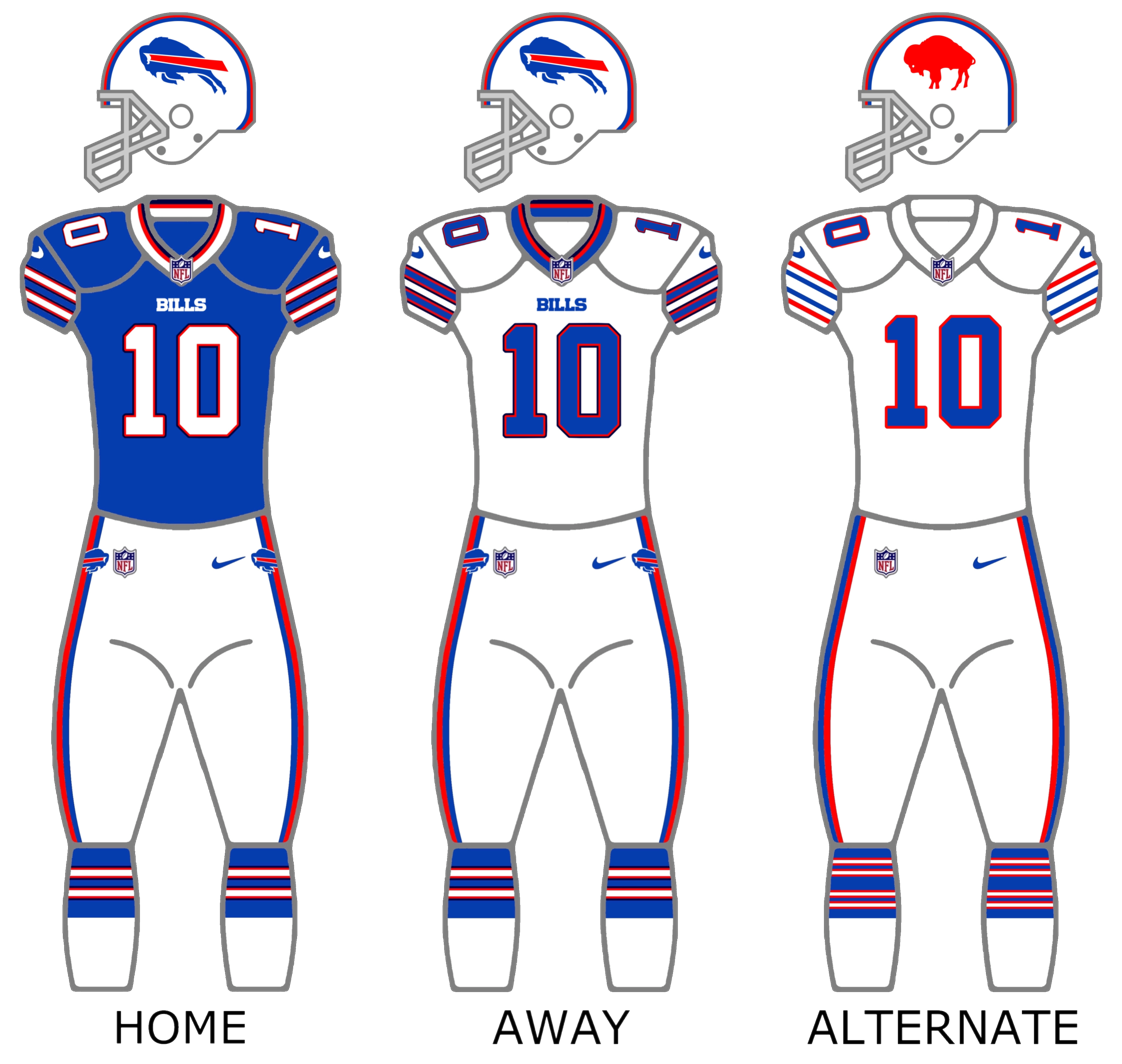

The 2012 season was the Buffalo Bills' 43rd in the National Football League (NFL), their 53rd overall, and their third and final season under head coach Chan Gailey. The team had hoped to make the playoffs for the first time since 1999, but instead extended the NFL's longest playoff drought.

2012 was the final year on the Bills' current lease at Ralph Wilson Stadium, as well as the final year on the Bills Toronto Series agreement. The league had approved an additional five-year extension of the Toronto series, extending through 2017 on the condition that the Bills and Rogers Communications came to an agreement to do so, a condition that both sides indicated willingness to do. The Bills and the league demanded significant and expensive renovations to Ralph Wilson Stadium as a condition of renewing the stadium lease. The Buffalo News reported renovations could top $200 million. The Bills and Erie County (the owners of Ralph Wilson Stadium) missed the deadline for a long-term agreement in September 2012; however, on December 21, the Bills agreed with Erie County to a 10-year lease on Ralph Wilson Stadium, extending it for at least another seven years.

== Personnel changes ==
On January 2, 2012, one day after the conclusion of the season, George Edwards was fired from his position as defensive coordinator. Edwards had been the defensive coordinator for the 2010 and 2011 seasons. Former NFL and college head coach Dave Wannstedt was promoted to defensive coordinator. (Bills head coach Chan Gailey had been the offensive coordinator under Wannstedt in 2000 and 2001, when Wannstedt was Miami's head coach.)

== Roster changes ==
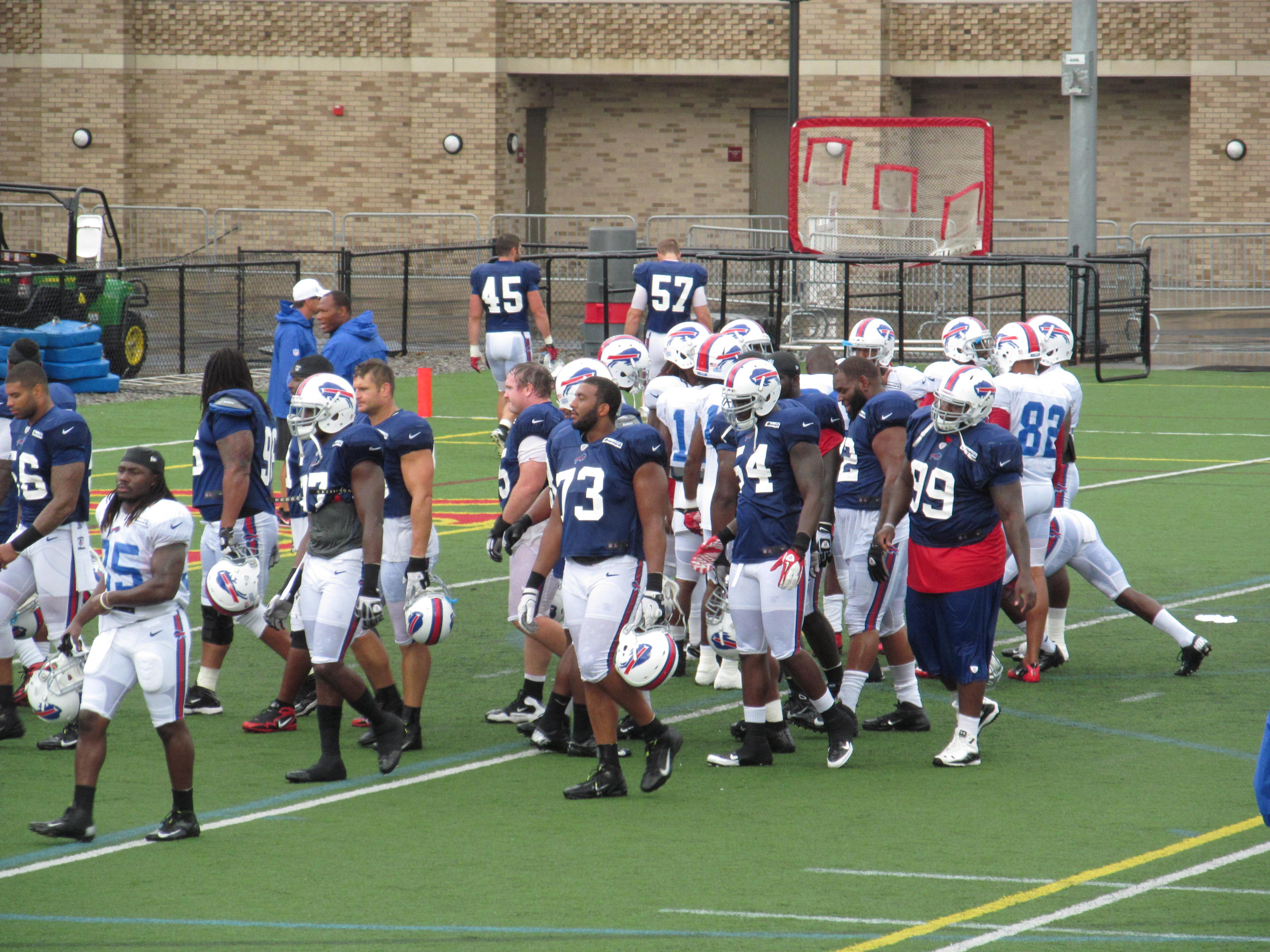
Buffalo's defensive linemen at training camp in August 2012

In his annual season-ending press conference, general manager Buddy Nix laid out his priorities for the offseason. Nix stated that the team was eager to re-sign wide receiver Stevie Johnson, kicker Rian Lindell and offensive tackle Demetress Bell. Johnson and Lindell were successfully re-signed; Bell was signed by Philadelphia. He also stated that he wanted to re-sign running back Fred Jackson and have him retire as a Bill. Jackson whose contract ran through the end of the 2012 season was having a career season before a mid season 2011 injury. Johnson renewed his contract with the Bills for five years and $36.2 million on March 5, 2012.

On March 15, 2012, the Bills made the biggest free agent acquisition in team history, signing all-pro defensive end Mario Williams to a contract worth $100 million over six years, with $50 million guaranteed, the largest contract for a defensive player in NFL history at the time. The recruiting of Williams took place over three days, starting with general manager Buddy Nix and defensive coordinator Dave Wannstedt escorting Williams to Buffalo in a private jet. Bills Hall of Fame quarterback Jim Kelly was also part of the recruiting.

On March 21, 2012 Mark Anderson, who had 12.5 sacks with the Patriots over the 2011 regular season and playoffs, signed a four-year deal with Buffalo. With announced plans to switch to the 4–3 defense the Bills could field Mario Williams at left end and Anderson on the opposite side in passing situations. Kyle Williams and Marcell Dareus would anchor the middle of the defensive line.

On May 11, 2012, the Bills made yet another high-profile signing by signing QB Vince Young to a one-year contract to back up Ryan Fitzpatrick. Young was the 3rd overall pick in the 2006 NFL draft. He was nonetheless released in the middle of the preseason, with Gailey citing inconsistency as the reason, and replaced by Tarvaris Jackson, whom the Bills acquired in a trade with the Seattle Seahawks. Because Jackson was not ready for the start of the regular season, the Bills went with four quarterbacks on its roster for the first several weeks of the season.

Kickoff specialist John Potter, a rookie, made the 53-man roster. He specialized in kickoffs to ease pressure on the team's aging kickers, placekicker Rian Lindell and punter Brian Moorman, who handled the duties in the past. (Moorman would be released from the roster three weeks into the regular season.)

=== 2012 draft ===
Round	Selection	Player	Position	College
1	10	Stephon Gilmore	Cornerback	South Carolina
2	41	Cordy Glenn	Guard	Georgia
3	69	T. J. Graham	Wide receiver	NC State
4	105	Nigel Bradham	Outside linebacker	Florida State
4	124^{[a]}	Ron Brooks	Cornerback	LSU
5	144	Zebrie Sanders	Tackle	Florida State
5	147^{[b]}	Tank Carder	Inside Linebacker	TCU
6	178	Mark Asper	Guard	Oregon
7	251^{[c]}	John Potter	Kicker	Western Michigan

Notes

^{^[a]} The team acquired an additional fourth-round selection (#124 overall) in a trade that sent wide receiver Lee Evans to the Baltimore Ravens.
^{^[b]} The team acquired an additional fifth-round selection (#147 overall) as part of a trade that sent running back Marshawn Lynch to the Seattle Seahawks.
^{^[c]} Compensatory selection.

=== Undrafted free agents ===
Stanford safety Delano Howell, Missouri State running back Chris Douglas, Virginia Tech cornerback Cris Hill, Colorado State offensive lineman Paul Madsen, Florida State punter Shawn Powell, Texas offensive lineman David Snow, Penn State safety Nick Sukay, Mercyhurst safety/long snapper Ian Wild, Texas A&M linebacker Garrick Williams and Richmond quarterback Aaron Corp. Corp was later released.

== Staff ==
2012 Buffalo Bills staff
Front office: President – Ralph Wilson; CEO – Russ Brandon; Executive vice president/general manager – Buddy Nix; Senior vice president of football administration – Jim Overdorf; Director of Football Administration – Don Purdy; Assistant general manager/director of player personnel – Doug Whaley; Player Personnel Analyst – Kevin Meganck; Director of pro personnel – Tom Gibbons; Pro Personnel Coordinator – Rob Hanrahan; Director of college scouting – Chuck Cook; Head coaches: Head coach – Chan Gailey; Assistant head coach/defensive coordinator – Dave Wannstedt; Offensive coaches: Offensive coordinator/running backs – Curtis Modkins; Quarterbacks – David Lee; Wide receivers – Bob Bicknell; Tight ends – Pete Metzelaars; Offensive line – Joe D'Alessandris; Assistant running backs – Charles Huff; Assistant offensive line – Andrew Dees; Offensive quality control/assistant wide receivers – Kevin Patullo	Defensive coaches: Defensive line – Giff Smith; Assistant defensive line – William Inge; Linebackers – Bob Sanders; Defensive backs – George Catavolos; Assistant defensive backs – Adrian White; Defensive quality control – Eric Thatcher; Special teams coaches: Special teams coordinator – Bruce DeHaven; Assistant special teams – Stan Kwan; Strength and conditioning: Head strength and conditioning – Eric Ciano; Head strength and conditioning – John Gamble

== Final roster ==
2012 Buffalo Bills roster
Quarterbacks (QB): 14 Ryan Fitzpatrick; 7 Tarvaris Jackson; 4 Tyler Thigpen; Running backs (RB): 20 Tashard Choice; 38 Corey McIntyre FB; 28 C. J. Spiller; Wide receivers (WR): 18 Kevin Elliott; 11 T. J. Graham; 15 Chris Hogan; 13 Stevie Johnson; 82 Ruvell Martin; 16 Brad Smith; Tight ends (TE): 42 Dorin Dickerson; 85 Lee Smith	Offensive linemen (OL): 77 Cordy Glenn T; 75 Chris Hairston T; 67 Andy Levitre G; 73 Chris Scott T; 61 David Snow C; 60 Kraig Urbik G; 66 Thomas Welch T; 68 Keith Williams G; 70 Eric Wood C; 71 Sam Young T; Defensive linemen (DL): 93 Mark Anderson DE; 92 Alex Carrington DE; 99 Marcell Dareus NT; 91 Spencer Johnson NT; 73 Jay Ross NT; 95 Kyle Williams; 94 Mario Williams DE	Linebackers (LB): 50 Nick Barnett ILB; 53 Nigel Bradham OLB; 59 Greg Lloyd Jr. OLB; 56 Shawne Merriman OLB; 54 Kyle Moore OLB; 58 Kirk Morrison ILB; 43 Bryan Scott LB; 55 Kelvin Sheppard ILB; 51 Chris White OLB; Defensive backs (DB): 33 Ron Brooks CB; 29 Crezdon Butler CB; 31 Jairus Byrd FS; 27 Stephon Gilmore CB; 24 Terrence McGee CB; 21 Leodis McKelvin CB/RS; 25 Da'Norris Searcy SS; 30 Mana Silva FS; 23 Aaron Williams CB; 37 George Wilson SS; Special teams (ST): 9 Rian Lindell K; 6 Shawn Powell P; 65 Garrison Sanborn LS	Practice squad: 35 Zach Brown RB; 97 Corbin Bryant DT; 88 Derek Buttles TE; 81 Marcus Easley WR; 96 Jarron Gilbert DE; 62 Adam Grant T; 36 T. J. Heath CB; 63 Andrew Jackson G; 26 Justin Rogers CB; 56 Brian Smith LB; Reserve: 74 Colin Brown G (IR); 80 Mike Caussin TE (IR); 84 Scott Chandler TE (IR); 75 Chris Hairston T (IR); 22 Fred Jackson RB (IR); 19 Donald Jones WR (NF-Ill.); 90 Chris Kelsay DE (IR); 52 Arthur Moats OLB (IR); 86 David Nelson WR (IR); 79 Erik Pears T (IR); 76 Chad Rinehart G (IR); 72 Zebrie Sanders T (IR); 98 Torell Troup DT (IR); Rookies in italics 53 active, 13 reserve, 10 practice squad

== Schedule ==
=== Preseason ===
Week	Date	Opponent	Result	Record	Venue	Recap
1	August 9	Washington Redskins	**L** 6–7	0–1	Ralph Wilson Stadium	Recap
2	August 17	at Minnesota Vikings	**L** 14–36	0–2	Mall of America Field	Recap
3	August 25	Pittsburgh Steelers	**L** 7–38	0–3	Ralph Wilson Stadium	Recap
4	August 30	at Detroit Lions	**L** 32–38	0–4	Ford Field	Recap

=== Regular season ===
Week	Date	Opponent	Result	Record	Venue	Recap
1	September 9	at **New York Jets**	**L** 28–48	0–1	MetLife Stadium	Recap
2	September 16	Kansas City Chiefs	**W** 35–17	1–1	Ralph Wilson Stadium	Recap
3	September 23	at Cleveland Browns	**W** 24–14	2–1	Cleveland Browns Stadium	Recap
4	September 30	**New England Patriots**	**L** 28–52	2–2	Ralph Wilson Stadium	Recap
5	October 7	at San Francisco 49ers	**L** 3–45	2–3	Candlestick Park	Recap
6	October 14	at Arizona Cardinals	**W** 19–16 (OT)	3–3	University of Phoenix Stadium	Recap
7	October 21	Tennessee Titans	**L** 34–35	3–4	Ralph Wilson Stadium	Recap
8	Bye					
9	November 4	at Houston Texans	**L** 9–21	3–5	Reliant Stadium	Recap
10	November 11	at **New England Patriots**	**L** 31–37	3–6	Gillette Stadium	Recap
11	November 15	**Miami Dolphins**	**W** 19–14	4–6	Ralph Wilson Stadium	Recap
12	November 25	at Indianapolis Colts	**L** 13–20	4–7	Lucas Oil Stadium	Recap
13	December 2	Jacksonville Jaguars	**W** 34–18	5–7	Ralph Wilson Stadium	Recap
14	December 9	St. Louis Rams	**L** 12–15	5–8	Ralph Wilson Stadium	Recap
15	December 16	Seattle Seahawks	**L** 17–50	5–9	(Canada) Rogers Centre (Toronto)	Recap
16	December 23	at **Miami Dolphins**	**L** 10–24	5–10	Sun Life Stadium	Recap
17	December 30	**New York Jets**	**W** 28–9	6–10	Ralph Wilson Stadium	Recap

Note: Intra-division opponents are in bold text.

# Indicates the game was part of the Bills Toronto Series.

=== Game summaries ===
==== Week 1: at New York Jets ====
Week One: Buffalo Bills at New York Jets – Game summary

Quarter	1	2	3	4	Total
Bills	0	7	7	14	**28**
**Jets**	7	20	14	7	**48**

at MetLife Stadium, East Rutherford, New Jersey

- Date: September 9
- Game time: 1:00 p.m. EDT
- Game weather: 74 °F (23 °C), sunny
- Game attendance: 79,088
- Referee: Robert Frazer
- TV announcers (CBS): Marv Albert and Rich Gannon

Game information

**First quarter**

- Jeremy Kerley 12-yard pass from Mark Sanchez (Nick Folk kick) Jets 7–0, **Drive: 8 plays, 61 yards, 3:49.**

**Second quarter**

- Stephen Hill 33-yard pass from Mark Sanchez (Nick Folk kick) Jets 14–0, **Drive: 5 plays, 52 yards, 2:31.**
- Jeremy Kerley 68-yard punt return Jets 21–0
- C. J. Spiller 56-yard run (Rian Lindell kick), Jets 21–7, **Drive: 7 plays, 80 yards, 3:34.**
- Nick Folk 25-yard field goal, Jets 24–7, **Drive: 15 plays, 73 yards, 7:09.**
- Nick Folk 39-yard field goal, Jets 27–7, **Drive: 7 plays, 32 yards, 1:24.**

**Third quarter**

- Antonio Cromartie 40-yard interception return (Nick Folk kick), Jets 34–7
- Stephen Hill 33-yard pass from Mark Sanchez (Nick Folk kick) Jets 41–7, **Drive: 4 plays, 48 yards, 2:10.**
- Scott Chandler 5-yard pass from Ryan Fitzpatrick (Rian Lindell kick), Jets 41–14, **Drive: 9 plays, 77 yards, 5:12.**

**Fourth quarter**

- Donald Jones 6-yard pass from Ryan Fitzpatrick (Rian Lindell kick), Jets 41–21, **Drive: 13 plays, 96 yards, 6:14.**
- Stevie Johnson 29-yard pass from Ryan Fitzpatrick (Rian Lindell kick), Jets 41–28, **Drive: 5 plays, 41 yards, 0:54.**
- Shonn Greene 1-yard run (Nick Folk kick), Jets 48–28, **Drive: 8 plays, 49 yards, 4:41.**

**Top passers**

- BUF –Ryan Fitzpatrick, 18/32, 195 Yds, 3 TD, 3 INT
- NYJ –Mark Sanchez, 19/27, 266 Yds, 3 TD, 1 INT

**Top rushers**

- BUF –C. J. Spiller, 14 Car, 169 Yds, 1 TD
- NYJ –Shonn Greene, 27 Car, 94 Yds, 1 TD

**Top receivers**s

- BUF –Steve Johnson, 4 Rec, 55 Yds, 1 TD
- NYJ –Stephen Hill, 5 Rec, 89 Yds, 2 TD

**Top tacklers**

- BUF – Nick Barnett – 5 tackles, 4 assists
- NYJ – LaRon Landry – 6 tackles, 1 assist, 1 forced fumble

==== Week 2: vs. Kansas City Chiefs ====
Week Two: Kansas City Chiefs at Buffalo Bills – Game summary

Quarter	1	2	3	4	Total
Chiefs	0	0	0	17	**17**
**Bills**	7	14	14	0	**35**

at Ralph Wilson Stadium, Orchard Park, New York

- Date: September 16
- Game time: 1:00 p.m. EDT
- Game weather: 66 °F (19 °C), mostly sunny
- Game attendance: 69,402
- Referee: Robert Dalton
- TV announcers (CBS): Spero Dedes and Steve Beuerlein

Game information

**First quarter**

- C. J. Spiller 17-yard run (Rian Lindell kick) Bills 7–0, **Drive: 11 plays, 94 yards, 5:52.**

**Second quarter**

- C. J. Spiller 5-yard run (Rian Lindell kick) Bills 14–0, **Drive: 7 plays, 67 yards, 2:55.**
- Scott Chandler 10-yard pass from Ryan Fitzpatrick (Rian Lindell kick) Bills 21–0, **Drive: 6 plays, 43 yards, 3:29.**

**Third quarter**

- Ryan Succop 33-yard field goal Bills 21–3, **Drive: 7 plays, 23 yards, 3:33.**
- Stevie Johnson 49-yard pass from Ryan Fitzpatrick (Rian Lindell kick), Bills 28–3, **Drive: 4 plays, 90 yards, 1:57.**
- Leodis McKelvin 88-yard punt return (Rian Lindell kick), Bills 35–3

**Fourth quarter**

- Dwayne Bowe 33-yard pass from Matt Cassel (Ryan Succop kick), Bills 35–10, **Drive: 5 plays, 80 yards, 2:13.**
- Dwayne Bowe 2-yard pass from Matt Cassel (Ryan Succop kick), Bills 35–17, **Drive: 9 plays, 83 yards, 2:51.**

**Top passers**

- KC –Matt Cassel, 23–42, 301 Yds, 2 TD, 1 INT
- BUF –Ryan Fitzpatrick, 10–19, 178 Yds, 2 TD

**Top rushers**

- KC –Peyton Hillis, 11 Car, 66 Yds, 0 TD
- BUF –C. J. Spiller, 15 Car, 123 Yds, 2 TD

**Top receivers**

- KC –Dwayne Bowe, 8 Rec, 102 Yds, 2 TD
- BUF –Stevie Johnson, 2 Rec, 56 Yds, 1 TD

**Top tackler**s

- KC –Derrick Johnson – 7 tackles, 2 assists
- BUF –Stephon Gilmore – 7 tackles, 0 assist

==== Week 3: at Cleveland Browns ====
Week Three: Buffalo Bills at Cleveland Browns – Game summary

Quarter	1	2	3	4	Total
**Bills**	14	0	3	7	**24**
Browns	0	7	7	0	**14**

at Cleveland Browns Stadium, Cleveland, Ohio

- Date: September 23
- Game time: 1:00 p.m. EDT
- Game weather: 53 °F (12 °C), rain
- Game attendance: 69,353
- Referee: David Scott
- TV announcers (CBS): Spero Dedes and Steve Beuerlein

Game information

First quarter:

- T. J. Graham 9-yard pass from Ryan Fitzpatrick (Rian Lindell kick), Bills 7–0, **Drive: 8 plays, 63 yards, 4:21.**
- C. J. Spiller 32-yard pass from Ryan Fitzpatrick (Rian Lindell kick), Bills 14–0, **Drive: 4 plays, 49 yards, 1:53.**

Second quarter:

- Trent Richardson 6-yard run (Phil Dawson kick), Bills 14–7, **Drive: 9 plays, 62 yards, 4:41.**

Third quarter:

- Rian Lindell 37-yard field goal, Bills 17–7, **Drive: 9 plays, 39 yards, 4:22.**
- Travis Benjamin 22-yard pass from Brandon Weeden (Phil Dawson kick), Bills 17–14, **Drive: 13 plays, 80 yards, 4:38.**

Fourth quarter:

- Stevie Johnson 9-yard pass from Ryan Fitzpatrick (Rian Lindell kick), Bills 24–14, **Drive: 10 plays, 68 yards, 5:27.**

**Top passers**

- BUF –Ryan Fitzpatrick, 22–35, 208 Yds, 3 TD
- CLE –Brandon Weeden, 27–43, 237 Yds, 1 TD, 2 INT

**Top rushers**

- BUF –Tashard Choice, 20 Car, 91 Yds, 0 TD
- CLE –Trent Richardson, 12 Car, 27 Yds, 1 TD

**Top receivers**

- BUF –Stevie Johnson, 7 Rec, 61 Yds, 1 TD
- CLE –Jordan Cameron, 5 Rec, 45 Yds, 0 TD

**Top tacklers**

- BUF – Nick Barnett – 8 tackles, 1 assist
- CLE – Craig Robertson – 8 tackles, 1 assist

==== Week 4: vs. New England Patriots ====
Week Four: New England Patriots at Buffalo Bills – Game summary

Quarter	1	2	3	4	Total
**Patriots**	7	0	14	31	**52**
Bills	0	14	7	7	**28**

at Ralph Wilson Stadium, Orchard Park, New York

- Date: September 30
- Game time: 1:00 p.m. EDT
- Game weather: 52 °F (11 °C), partly cloudy
- Game attendance: 70,684
- Referee: John Parry
- TV announcers (CBS): Greg Gumbel and Dan Dierdorf

Game information

**First quarter**

- Stevan Ridley 6-yard run (Stephen Gostkowski kick), Patriots 7–0, **Drive: 7 plays, 90 yards, 3:07.**

**Second quarter**

- Scott Chandler 24-yard pass from Ryan Fitzpatrick (Rian Lindell kick), TIE 7–7, **Drive: 1 play, 24 yards, 0:08.**
- Scott Chandler 20-yard pass from Ryan Fitzpatrick (Rian Lindell kick), Bills 14–7, **Drive: 5 plays, 68 yards, 2:12.**

**Third quarter**

- Donald Jones 68-yard pass from Ryan Fitzpatrick (Rian Lindell kick), Bills 21–7, **Drive: 5 plays, 88 yards, 2:37.**
- Danny Woodhead 17-yard pass from Tom Brady (Stephen Gostkowski kick), Bills 21–14, **Drive: 8 plays, 80 yards, 2:58.**
- Tom Brady 4-yard run (Stephen Gostkowski kick), TIE 21–21, **Drive: 8 plays, 78 yards, 3:19.**

**Fourth quarter**

- Rob Gronkowski 28-yard pass from Tom Brady (Stephen Gostkowski kick), Patriots 28–21, **Drive: 5 plays, 63 yards, 2:01.**
- Stevan Ridley 2-yard run (Stephen Gostkowski kick), Patriots 35–21, **Drive: 6 plays, 42 yard, 1:44.**
- Brandon Bolden 7-yard run (Stephen Gostkowski kick), Patriots 42–21, **Drive: 2 plays, 12 yards, 0:50.**
- Brad Smith 35-yard pass from Ryan Fitzpatrick (Rian Lindell kick), Patriots 42–28, **Drive: 11 plays, 80 yards, 3:57.**
- Brandon Lloyd 25-yard pass from Tom Brady (Stephen Gostkowski kick), Patriots 49–28, **Drive: 6 plays, 48 yards, 2:30.**
- Stephen Gostkowski 30-yard field goal, Patriots 52–28, **Drive: 4 plays, 7 yards, 1:58.**

**Top passers**

- NE –Tom Brady, 22–36, 340 Yds, 3 TD
- BUF –Ryan Fitzpatrick, 22–39, 350 Yds, 4 TD, 4 INT

**Top rushers**

- NE –Brandon Bolden, 16 Car, 137 Yds, 1 TD
- BUF –C. J. Spiller, 8 Car, 33 Yds, 0 TD

**Top receivers**

- NE –Wes Welker, 9 Rec, 129 Yds, 0 TD
- BUF –Donald Jones, 2 Rec, 90 Yds, 1 TD

**Top tacklers**

- NE – Rob Ninkovich – 7 tackles, 3 assists, 1 forced fumble, 1 sack
- BUF – Nick Barnett – 15 tackles, 5 assists

==== Week 5: at San Francisco 49ers ====
Week Five: Buffalo Bills at San Francisco 49ers – Game summary

Quarter	1	2	3	4	Total
Bills	0	3	0	0	**3**
**49ers**	3	14	7	21	**45**

at Candlestick Park, San Francisco, California

- Date: October 7
- Game time: 4:15 p.m. EDT/1:15 p.m. PDT
- Game weather: 62 °F (17 °C), sunny
- Game attendance: 69,732
- Referee: Jerome Boger
- TV announcers (CBS): Kevin Harlan and Solomon Wilcots

Game information

**First quarter**

- David Akers 19-yard field goal, 49ers 3–0, **Drive: 6 plays, 79 yards, 3:17.**

**Second quarter**

- Rian Lindell 31-yard field goal, TIE 3–3, **Drive: 12 plays, 80 yards, 5:44.**
- Kyle Williams 43-yard pass from Alex Smith (David Akers kick), 49ers 10–3, **Drive: 2 plays, 79 yards, 0:52.**
- Michael Crabtree 28-yard pass from Alex Smith (David Akers kick), 49ers 17–3, **Drive: 1 play, 28 yards, 0:05.**

**Third quarter**

- Frank Gore 1-yard run (David Akers kick), 49ers 24–3, **Drive: 5 plays, 81 yards, 2:44.**

**Fourth quarter**

- Mario Manningham 10-yard pass from Alex Smith (David Akers kick), 49ers 31–3, **Drive: 13 plays, 89 yards, 7:48.**
- Colin Kaepernick 16-yard run (David Akers kick), 49ers 38–3, **Drive: 7 plays, 62 yards, 3:05.**
- Anthony Dixon 3-yard run (David Akers kick), 49ers 45–3, **Drive: 11 plays, 69 yards, 6:29.**

**Top passers**

- BUF –Ryan Fitzpatrick, 16–26, 126 Yds, 0 TD, 1 INT
- SF –Alex Smith, 18–24, 303 Yds, 3 TD, 0 INT

**Top rushers**

- BUF –Brad Smith, 1 Car, 35 Yds, 0 TD
- SF –Frank Gore, 14 Car, 106 Yds, 1 TD

**Top receivers**

- BUF –Scott Chandler, 4 Rec, 40 Yds, 0 TD
- SF –Michael Crabtree, 6 Rec, 113 Yds, 1 TD

**Top tacklers**

- BUF – Nigel Bradham – 6 tackles
- SF – Patrick Willis – 7 tackles, 1 forced fumble

==== Week 6: at Arizona Cardinals ====
Week Six: Buffalo Bills at Arizona Cardinals – Game summary

Quarter	1	2	3	4	OT	Total
**Bills**	9	0	7	0	3	**19**
Cardinals	3	7	3	3	0	**16**

at University of Phoenix Stadium, Glendale, Arizona

- Date: October 14
- Game time: 4:05 p.m. EDT/1:05 p.m. Arizona time
- Game weather: Played indoors (retractable roof closed)
- Game attendance: 60,385
- Referee: Alberto Riveron
- TV announcers (CBS): Bill Macatee and Steve Tasker

Game information

**First quarter**

- Jay Feely 49-yard field goal, Cardinals 3–0, **Drive: 4 plays, 2 yards, 0:55.**
- Kevin Kolb sacked in the end zone by Chris Kelsay, Cardinals 3–2
- C. J. Spiller 10-yard run (Rian Lindell kick), Bills 9–3, **Drive: 10 plays, 49 yards, 5:01.**

**Second quarter**

- Larry Fitzgerald 9-yard pass from Kevin Kolb (Jay Feely kick), Cardinals 10–9, **Drive: 10 plays, 67 yards, 5:38.**

**Third quarter**

- Jay Feely 49-yard field goal, Cardinals 13–9, **Drive: 12 plays, 53 yards, 6:18.**
- Fred Jackson 1-yard run (Rian Lindell kick), Bills 16–13, **Drive: 5 plays, 80 yards, 2:35.**

**Fourth quarter**

- Jay Feely 61-yard field goal, TIE 16–16, **Drive: 10 plays, 52 yards, 1:58.**

**Overtime**

- Rian Lindell 25-yard field goal, Bills 19–16, **Drive: 2 plays, −1 yards, 0:45.**

**Top passers**

- BUF –Ryan Fitzpatrick, 18–32, 153 Yds, 0 TD
- ARI –Kevin Kolb, 14–26, 128 Yds, 1 TD, 1 INT

**Top rushers**

- BUF –C. J. Spiller, 12 Car, 88 Yds, 1 TD
- ARI –William Powell, 13 Car, 70 Yds, 0 TD

**Top receivers**

- BUF –Stevie Johnson, 6 Rec, 82 Yds, 0 TD
- ARI –Larry Fitzgerald, 6 Rec, 93 Yds, 1 TD

**Top tackler**s

- BUF – Kelvin Sheppard – 9 tackles, 2 assists
- ARI – Daryl Washington – 14 tackles, 2 assists, 1 forced fumble

==== Week 7: vs. Tennessee Titans ====
Week Seven: Tennessee Titans at Buffalo Bills – Game summary

Quarter	1	2	3	4	Total
**Titans**	14	7	7	7	**35**
Bills	14	6	14	0	**34**

at Ralph Wilson Stadium, Orchard Park, New York

- Date: October 21
- Game time: 1:00 p.m. EDT
- Game weather: 55 °F (13 °C), mostly sunny
- Game attendance: 68,836
- Referee: Mike Carey
- TV announcers (CBS): Marv Albert and Rich Gannon

Game information

**First quarter**

- Chris Johnson 16-yard run (Rob Bironas kick), Titans 7–0, **Drive: 8 plays, 72 yards, 4:22.**
- Fred Jackson 3-yard pass from Ryan Fitzpatrick (Rian Lindell kick), TIE 7–7, **Drive: 13 plays, 93 yards, 7:37.**
- Chris Johnson 83-yard run (Rob Bironas kick), Titans 14–7, **Drive: 1 play, 83 yards, 0:18.**
- Brad Smith 89-yard kickoff return (Rian Lindell kick), TIE 14–14

**Second quarter**

- Jamie Harper 1-yard run (Rob Bironas kick), Titans 21–14, **Drive: 14 plays, 80 yards, 7:13.**
- Rian Lindell 31-yard field goal, Titans 21–17, **Drive: 10 plays, 68 yards, 6:22.**
- Rian Lindell 42-yard field goal, Titans 21–20, **Drive: 10 plays, 53 yards, 1:47.**

**Third quarter**

- Jamie Harper 1-yard run (Rob Bironas kick), Titans 28–20, **Drive: 8 plays, 32 yards, 2:58.**
- Donald Jones 15-yard pass from Ryan Fitzpatrick (Rian Lindell kick), Titans 28–27, **Drive: 7 plays, 66 yards, 3:53.**
- Stevie Johnson 27-yard pass from Ryan Fitzpatrick (Rian Lindell kick), Bills 34–28, **Drive: 9 plays, 80 yards, 4:36.**

**Fourth quarter**

- Nate Washington 15-yard pass from Matt Hasselbeck (Rob Bironas kick), Titans 35–34, **Drive: 7 plays, 52 yards, 1:54.**

**Top passers**

- TEN –Matt Hasselbeck, 22–33, 205 Yds, 1 TD
- BUF –Ryan Fitzpatrick, 27–35, 225 Yds, 3 TD, 1 INT

**Top rushers**

- TEN –Chris Johnson, 18 Car, 195 Yds, 2 TD
- BUF –Fred Jackson, 9 Car, 71 Yds, 0 TD

**Top receivers**

- TEN –Nate Washington, 6 Rec, 43 Yds, 1 TD
- BUF –Stevie Johnson, 5 Rec, 71 Yds, 1 TD

**Top tacklers**

- TEN – Jordan Babineaux – 12 tackles, 4 assists
- BUF – Nick Barnett – 9 tackles, 4 assists

==== Week 9: at Houston Texans ====
Week Nine: Buffalo Bills at Houston Texans – Game summary

Quarter	1	2	3	4	Total
Bills	0	6	3	0	**9**
**Texans**	7	0	7	7	**21**

at Reliant Stadium, Houston, Texas

- Date: November 4
- Game time: 1:00 p.m. EST/12:00 p.m. CST
- Game weather: Played indoors (retractable roof closed)
- Game attendance: 71,698
- Referee: Bill Vinovich
- TV announcers (CBS): Ian Eagle and Dan Fouts

Game information

**First quarter**

- Owen Daniels 39-yard pass from Matt Schaub (Shayne Graham kick), Texans 7–0, **Drive: 4 plays, 77 yards, 2:00.**

**Second quarter**

- Rian Lindell 22-yard field goal, Texans 7–3, **Drive: 10 plays, 65 yards, 4:40.**
- Rian Lindell 38-yard field goal, Texans 7–6, **Drive: 6 plays, 47 yards, 0:47.**

**Third quarter**

- Arian Foster 3-yard run (Shayne Graham kick), Texans 14–6, **Drive: 5 plays, 43 yards, 2:16.**
- Rian Lindell 39-yard field goal, Texans 14–9, **Drive: 8 plays, 56 yards, 4:30.**

**Fourth quarter**

- Garrett Graham 5-yard pass from Matt Schaub (Shayne Graham kick), Texans 21–9, **Drive: 11 plays, 68 yards, 6:30.**

**Top passers**

- BUF –Ryan Fitzpatrick, 25–38, 239 Yds, 0 TD
- HOU –Matt Schaub, 19–27, 268 Yds, 2 TD

**Top rushers**

- BUF –C. J. Spiller, 6 Car, 39 Yds, 0 TD
- HOU –Arian Foster, 24 Car, 111 Yds, 1 TD

**Top receivers**

- BUF –Donald Jones, 6 Rec, 65 Yds, 0 TD
- HOU –Andre Johnson, 8 Rec, 118 Yds, 0 TD

**Top tacklers**

- BUF – Mario Williams – 7 tackles, 2 assists, 1 sack
- HOU – Glover Quin – 6 tackles, 2 assists

==== Week 10: at New England Patriots ====
Week Ten: Buffalo Bills at New England Patriots – Game summary

Quarter	1	2	3	4	Total
Bills	0	17	7	7	**31**
**Patriots**	10	14	7	6	**37**

at Gillette Stadium, Foxborough, Massachusetts

- Date: November 11
- Game time: 1:00 p.m. EST
- Game weather: 60 °F (16 °C), sunny
- Game attendance: 68,756
- Referee: Bill Leavy
- TV announcers (CBS): Ian Eagle and Dan Fouts

Game information

**First quarter**

- Stephen Gostkowski 43-yard field goal, Patriots 3–0, **Drive: 13 plays, 48 yards, 4:27.**
- Stevan Ridley 1-yard run (Stepen Gostkowski kick), Patriots 10–0, **Drive: 3 plays, 13 yards, 1:30.**

**Second quarter**

- Rian Lindell 41-yard field goal, Patriots 10–3, **Drive: 11 plays, 57 yards, 6:47.**
- Danny Woodhead 15-yard run (Stephen Gostkowski kick), Patriots 17–3, **Drive: 8 plays, 83 yards, 2:58.**
- Fred Jackson 14-yard run (Rian Lindell kick), Patriots 17–10, **Drive: 6 plays, 80 yards, 3:06.**
- Rob Gronkowski 2-yard pass from Tom Brady (Stephen Gostkowski kick), Patriots 24–10, **Drive: 6 plays, 82 yards, 2:09.**
- Scott Chandler 3-yard pass from Ryan Fitzpatrick (Rian Lindell kick), Patriots 24–17, **Drive: 11 plays, 80 yards, 3:23.**

**Third quarter**

- Danny Woodhead 18-yard pass from Tom Brady (Stephen Gostkowski kick), Patriots 31–17, **Drive: 4 plays, 39 yards, 1:38.**
- Fred Jackson 1-yard run (Rian Lindell kick), Patriots 31–24, **Drive: 11 plays, 84 yards, 5:29.**

**Fourth quarter**

- Stephen Gostkowski 48-yard field goal, Patriots 34–24, **Drive: 7 plays, 50 yards, 2:27.**
- Donald Jones 2-yard pass from Ryan Fitzpatrick (Rian Lindell kick), Patriots 34–31, **Drive: 5 plays, 45 yards, 1:29.**
- Stephen Gostkowski 27-yard field goal, Patriots 37–31, **Drive: 14 plays, 59 yards, 5:41.**

**Top passers**

- BUF –Ryan Fitzpatrick, 27/40, 337 Yds, 2 TD, 1 INT
- NE –Tom Brady, 23/38, 237 Yds, 2 TD

**Top rushers**

- BUF –Fred Jackson, 16 Car, 80 Yds, 2 TD
- NE –Stevan Ridley, 22 Car, 98 Yds, 1 TD

**Top receivers**

- BUF –Stevie Johnson, 6 Rec, 86 Yds, 0 TD
- NE –Wes Welker, 6 Rec, 74 Yds, 0 TD

**Top tacklers**

- BUF –Stephon Gilmore – 5 tackles, 1 assist
- NE –Brandon Spikes – 5 tackles, 6 assists, 1 forced fumble

With the loss, the Bills dropped to 3–6 and 0–11 against the Patriots at Gillette Stadium.

==== Week 11: vs. Miami Dolphins ====
Week Eleven: Miami Dolphins at Buffalo Bills – Game summary

Quarter	1	2	3	4	Total
Dolphins	7	0	0	7	**14**
**Bills**	13	6	0	0	**19**

at Ralph Wilson Stadium, Orchard Park, New York

- Date: November 15
- Game time: 8:20 p.m. EST
- Game weather: 35 °F (2 °C), clear and crisp
- Game attendance: 69,118
- Referee: Jeff Triplette
- TV announcers (NFLN): Brad Nessler, Mike Mayock and Alex Flanagan

Game information

**First quarter**

**Second quarter**

**Third quarter**

**Fourth quarter**

**Top passers**

- MIA –
- BUF –

**Top rushers**

- MIA –
- BUF –

**Top receivers**

- MIA –
- BUF –

**Top tackler**s

- MIA –
- BUF –

By beating the Dolphins on a Thursday Night Football showdown, Buffalo improved to 4–6 and snapped an 8-game losing skid against division rivals.

==== Week 12: at Indianapolis Colts ====
Week Twelve: Buffalo Bills at Indianapolis Colts – Game summary

Quarter	1	2	3	4	Total
Bills	3	3	0	7	**13**
**Colts**	7	6	7	0	**20**

at Lucas Oil Stadium, Indianapolis, Indiana

- Date: November 25
- Game time: 1:00 p.m. EST
- Game weather: Played indoors (retractable roof closed)
- Game attendance: 64,366
- Referee: Ed Hochuli
- TV announcers (CBS): Marv Albert and Rich Gannon

Game information

**First quarter**

**Second quarter**

**Third quarter**

**Fourth quarter**

**Top passers**

- BUF –
- IND –

**Top rushers**

- BUF –
- IND –

**Top receivers**

- BUF –
- IND –

**Top tackler**s

- BUF –
- IND –

==== Week 13: vs. Jacksonville Jaguars ====
Week Thirteen: Jacksonville Jaguars at Buffalo Bills – Game summary

Quarter	1	2	3	4	Total
Jaguars	0	10	0	8	**18**
**Bills**	7	10	10	7	**34**

at Ralph Wilson Stadium, Orchard Park, New York

- Date: December 2
- Game time: 1:00 p.m. EST
- Game weather: 52 °F (11 °C), rain
- Game attendance: 53,971
- Referee: Pete Morelli
- TV announcers (CBS): Spero Dedes and Steve Beuerlein (blacked out locally)

Game information

**First quarter**

**Second quarter**

**Third quarter**

**Fourth quarter**

**Top passers**

- JAC –
- BUF –

**Top rushers**

- JAC –
- BUF –

**Top receivers**

- JAC –
- BUF –

**Top tackler**s

- JAC –
- BUF –

With the win, the Bills improved to 5-7 and finished 1-3 against the AFC South.

==== Week 14: vs. St. Louis Rams ====
Week Fourteen: St. Louis Rams at Buffalo Bills – Game summary

Quarter	1	2	3	4	Total
**Rams**	0	0	0	15	**15**
Bills	3	3	6	0	**12**

at Ralph Wilson Stadium, Orchard Park, New York

- Date: December 9
- Game time: 1:00 p.m. EST
- Game weather: 37 °F (3 °C), cloudy
- Game attendance: 68,109
- Referee: Gene Steratore
- TV announcers (Fox): Ron Pitts, Mike Martz and Krista Voda

Game information

**First quarter**

**Second quarter**

**Third quarter**

**Fourth quarter**

**Top passers**

- STL –
- BUF –

**Top rushers**

- STL –
- BUF –

**Top receivers**

- STL –
- BUF –

**Top tackler**s

- STL –
- BUF –

==== Week 15: vs. Seattle Seahawks ====
Bills Toronto Series

Week Fifteen: Seattle Seahawks at Buffalo Bills – Game summary

Quarter	1	2	3	4	Total
**Seahawks**	14	17	16	3	**50**
Bills	7	10	0	0	**17**

at Rogers Centre, Toronto, Ontario, Canada

- Date: December 16
- Game time: 4:05 p.m. EST
- Game weather: Played indoors (retractable roof closed)
- Game attendance: 40,770
- Referee: Scott Green
- TV announcers (Fox): Dick Stockton, John Lynch and Jennifer Hale

Game information

**First quarter**

**Second quarter**

**Third quarter**

**Fourth quarter**

**Top passers**

- SEA –
- BUF –

**Top rushers**

- SEA –
- BUF –

**Top receivers**

- SEA –
- BUF –

**Top tackler**s

- SEA –
- BUF –

With the blowout loss, the Bills fell to 5-9 (1-3 against the NFC West) and they were eliminated from playoff contention for the 13th straight season.

==== Week 16: at Miami Dolphins ====
Week Sixteen: Buffalo Bills at Miami Dolphins – Game summary

Quarter	1	2	3	4	Total
Bills	0	3	0	7	**10**
**Dolphins**	7	7	10	0	**24**

at Sun Life Stadium, Miami Gardens, Florida

- Date: December 23
- Game time: 1:00 p.m. EST
- Game weather: 73 °F (23 °C), sunny
- Game attendance: 54,462
- Referee: Walt Anderson
- TV announcers (CBS): Don Criqui and Randy Cross

Game information

**First quarter**

**Second quarter**

**Third quarter**

**Fourth quarter**

**Top passers**

- BUF –
- MIA –

**Top rushers**

- BUF –
- MIA –

**Top receivers**

- BUF –
- MIA –

**Top tackler**s

- BUF –
- MIA –

With the loss, the Bills fell to 5-10 and they finished 2-6 on the road.

==== Week 17: vs. New York Jets ====
Week Seventeen: New York Jets at Buffalo Bills – Game summary

Quarter	1	2	3	4	Total
Jets	3	6	0	0	**9**
**Bills**	7	7	0	14	**28**

at Ralph Wilson Stadium, Orchard Park, New York

- Date: December 30
- Game time: 1:00 p.m. EST
- Game weather: 28 °F (−2 °C), mostly sunny
- Game attendance: 54,533
- Referee: Terry McAulay
- TV announcers (CBS): Marv Albert and Rich Gannon (blacked out locally)

Game information

**First quarter**

**Second quarter**

**Third quarter**

**Fourth quarter**

**Top passers**

- NYJ – Mark Sanchez
- BUF – Ryan Fitzpatrick

**Top rushers**

- NYJ – Shonn Greene
- BUF – C. J. Spiller

**Top receivers**

- NYJ – Jeremy Kerley
- BUF – Stevie Johnson

**Top tackler**s

- NYJ – Bart Scott
- BUF – Nick Barnett

External videos
- 2012 Jets at Bills - full game broadcast
- 2012 Jets at Bills - highlights

With the win, the Bills finished the 2012 season at 6-10 (2-4 against the AFC East) and 4-4 at home.

== Standings ==
AFC East
	W	L	T	PCT	DIV	CONF	PF	PA	STK
^{(2)} New England Patriots	12	4	0	.750	6–0	11–1	557	331	W2
Miami Dolphins	7	9	0	.438	2–4	5–7	288	317	L1
New York Jets	6	10	0	.375	2–4	4–8	281	375	L3
Buffalo Bills	6	10	0	.375	2–4	5–7	344	435	W1

== Statistics ==
=== Team leaders ===
	Player(s)	Value
Passing yards	Ryan Fitzpatrick	2471 Yards
Passing touchdowns	Ryan Fitzpatrick	20 TDs
Rushing yards	C. J. Spiller	907 Yards
Rushing touchdowns	C. J. Spiller	5 TDs
Receiving yards	Stevie Johnson	705 Yards
Receiving touchdowns	Scott Chandler	6 TDs
Points	Rian Lindell	83 Points
Kickoff Return Yards	Leodis McKelvin	453 Yards
Punt return Yards	Leodis McKelvin	387 Yards
Tackles	Nick Barnett	82 Tackles
Sacks	Mario Williams	9.5 Sacks
Interceptions	Jairus Byrd	5 INTs

stats values are correct through Week 14. '

=== League rankings ===
- Total Offense (YPG): 346.4 (17th)
- Passing (YPG): 199 (26th)
- Rushing (YPG): 147.9 (4th)
- Total Defense (YPG): 368.5 (24th)
- Passing (YPG): 229 (13th)
- Rushing (YPG): 139.2 (30th)

Stats correct through week 14.
