= List of Maine Black Bears in the NFL draft =

This is a list of Maine Black Bears football players in the NFL draft.

== Key ==
B	Back	K	Kicker	NT	Nose tackle
C	Center	LB	Linebacker	FB	Fullback
DB	Defensive back	P	Punter	HB	Halfback
DE	Defensive end	QB	Quarterback	WR	Wide receiver
DT	Defensive tackle	RB	Running back	G	Guard
E	End	T	Offensive tackle	TE	Tight end

== Selections ==
Year	Round	Pick	Player	Team	Position
1956	16	193	Thurlow Cooper	Cleveland Browns	E
1959	14	166	Roger Ellis	New York Giants	C
1962	18	242	Dave Cloutier	Dallas Cowboys	B
1967	5	113	John Huard	Denver Broncos	LB
1970	11	281	Gene Benner	Cleveland Browns	WR
1980	12	316	Roger Lapham	Buffalo Bills	TE
1983	12	331	Lorenzo Bouier	Dallas Cowboys	RB
1988	6	160	Rob Sterling	Philadelphia Eagles	DB
1990	6	156	Mike Buck	New Orleans Saints	QB
1990	7	183	Scott Hough	New Orleans Saints	G
1990	11	293	Justin Strzelczyk	Pittsburgh Steelers	T
2006	7	255	Kevin McMahan	Oakland Raiders	WR
2007	6	203	Daren Stone	Atlanta Falcons	DB
2012	4	133	Jerron McMillian	Green Bay Packers	DB
2014	6	148	Kendall James	Minnesota Vikings	DB
2016	7	239	Trevor Bates	Indianapolis Colts	LB
2018	6	192	Jamil Demby	Los Angeles Rams	T

== Notable undrafted players ==
Note: No drafts held before 1920

Debut year	Player name	Position	Debut NFL/AFL team	Notes
1962	Manch Wheeler	QB	Buffalo Bills	—
1979	Chris Keating	LB	Buffalo Bills	—
1984	Clay Pickering	WR	Cincinnati Bengals	—
1993	Dan Jones	T	Cincinnati Bengals	—
1997	Mike Flynn	C	Baltimore Ravens	—
2001	Phil McGeoghan	WR	Denver Broncos	—
2002	Chad Hayes	TE	Kansas City Chiefs	—
2003	Stephen Cooper	LB	San Diego Chargers	—
2005	Brandon McGowan	S	Chicago Bears	—
2006	Montell Owens	FB	Jacksonville Jaguars	—
2007	Mike DeVito	DE	New York Jets	—
2007	Matt King	LB	New York Jets	—
2008	Matthew Mulligan	TE	Miami Dolphins	—
2009	Jovan Belcher	LB	Kansas City Chiefs	—
2012	Derek Buttles	TE	Buffalo Bills	—
2014	Justin Perillo	TE	Green Bay Packers	—
2017	Patrick Ricard	FB	Baltimore Ravens	—
2019	Sterling Sheffield	LB	Cincinnati Bengals	—
2019	Micah Wright	WR	New Orleans Saints	—
2020	Earnest Edwards	WR/KR	Los Angeles Rams	—
2020	Ramon Jefferson	RB	Tampa Bay Buccaneers	—
2020	Manny Patterson	CB	Kansas City Chiefs	—
2020	Max Roberts	Edge	Los Angeles Rams	—
2022	Andre Miller	WR/TE	New York Giants	—
2023	Shawn Bowman	TE	Jacksonville Jaguars	—
2023	Zavier Scott	RB	Indianapolis Colts	—
2025	Xavier Holmes	Edge	New England Patriots	—
2026	Joe Fagnano	QB	Baltimore Ravens	—
