= Daryl Washington =

American football player (born 1986)

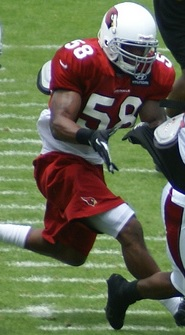
- Washington with the Arizona Cardinals in 2012

No. 58
- Position: Linebacker

Personal information
- Born: October 9, 1986 (age 40); Dallas, Texas, U.S.
- Listed height: 6 ft 2 in (1.88 m)
- Listed weight: 238 lb (108 kg)

Career information
- High school: Irving (Irving, Texas)
- College: TCU (2006–2009)
- NFL draft: 2010: 2nd round, 47th overall pick

Career history
- Arizona Cardinals (2010–2016)

Awards and highlights
- Second-team All-Pro (2012); Pro Bowl (2012); First-team All-American (2009); First-team All-MW (2009)

Career NFL statistics
- Total tackles: 389
- Sacks: 18
- Forced fumbles: 3
- Fumble recoveries: 2
- Interceptions: 6
- Stats at Pro Football Reference

Daryl Lewis Washington (born October 9, 1986) is an American former professional football player who was a linebacker for the Arizona Cardinals of the National Football League (NFL). He played college football for the TCU Horned Frogs, and was selected by the Cardinals in the second round of the 2010 NFL draft. In May 2014, he was suspended indefinitely by the league for violating its substance abuse policies and was not reinstated until April 2017, where he was released by the Cardinals shortly after.

== Early life ==
Washington attended Irving High School in Irving, Texas. He was named all-district defensive player of the year after he totaled 168 tackles with four sacks as a senior. He was selected to play in the Texas-Oklahoma Oil Bowl All-Star Game.

== College career ==
Washington attended Texas Christian University, where he played for the TCU Horned Frogs football team from 2006 to 2009. As a true freshman in 2006, he contributed at linebacker and on special teams. He recorded 16 tackles for the season (14 solo). In his sophomore year, he blocked a nation-best three punts, while also registering 32 tackles for the season (25 solo).

Although still primarily a back-up and special teams player, Washington was TCU's fourth-leading tackler with 63 stops in 2008. He started the 2008 Poinsettia Bowl and posted six tackles and three pass breakups in TCU's victory over Boise State. He started at middle linebacker in 2009 and established himself as one of the leaders TCU's defense, which was one of the best in the nation. He was named one of 12 semifinalists for the 2009 Butkus Award. He earned first-team All-MWC and All-American selections.

== Professional career ==
At the conclusion of the pre-draft process, Washington was projected to be a second round pick by Sports Illustrated. He was ranked as the fourth best outside linebacker available in the draft by Sports Illustrated and was ranked the fifth best outside linebacker by DraftScout.com.

External videos
- 2010 NFL Draft Profile: Daryl Washington
- Daryl Washington's NFL Combine Workout

Pre-draft measurables
Height	Weight	Arm length	Hand span	40-yard dash	10-yard split	20-yard split	Three-cone drill	Vertical jump	Broad jump	Bench press
6 ft 1 3/4 in (1.87 m)	230 lb (104 kg)	34 1/2 in (0.88 m)	9 1/2 in (0.24 m)	4.66 s	1.63 s	2.74 s	7.07 s	31 in (0.79 m)	9 ft 6 in (2.90 m)	17 reps
All values from NFL Combine/Pro Day

The Arizona Cardinals selected Washington in the second round (47th overall) of the 2010 NFL draft.

In 2010, Washington had 78 tackles, one sack, one forced fumble, and one interception that he fumbled.

Having started at inside linebacker since his rookie-season in 2010, Washington emerged to become among the best linebackers in NFL, being named to the 2012 All-Pro Team as well as being selected to participate in the 2013 Pro Bowl as an alternate for the NFC roster.

Washington agreed to a six-year contract extension on September 6, 2012.

Washington was suspended by the NFL in May 2014 before being conditionally reinstated on April 25, 2017. On May 11, 2017, the Arizona Cardinals officially released Washington after he refused to take a pay cut. On July 5, 2017, it was reported that the Dallas Cowboys were interested in possibly signing Washington, although this never happened.

== NFL career statistics ==
Year	Team	GP	Tackles				Fumbles			Interceptions					
Year	Team	GP	Cmb	Solo	Ast	Sck	FF	FR	Yds	Int	Yds	Avg	Lng	TD	PD
2010	ARI	16	78	67	11	1.0	1	0	0	1	39	39	39	0	2
2011	ARI	15	107	95	12	5.0	0	0	0	2	16	8	16	0	7
2012	ARI	16	134	108	26	9.0	2	1	3	1	7	7	7	0	4
2013	ARI	12	75	59	16	3.0	0	1	0	2	49	25	41	0	11
Career		59	394	329	65	18.0	3	2	0	6	111	19	41	0	24

== Controversies ==
=== NFL suspensions ===
On April 3, 2013, the NFL announced that Washington would be suspended for the first four games of the 2013 season for violating the league's substance policy. On May 30, 2014, Washington was suspended indefinitely for violating the league's substance policy again. He was conditionally reinstated on April 25, 2017, but was released by the Cardinals a month later.

=== Assault ===
On May 3, 2013, Washington was arrested in Phoenix, Arizona on two counts of aggravated assault (and one count of criminal trespass in the first-degree) from an incident on May 1, 2013 involving his 27-year-old ex-girlfriend with whom he shares a daughter. The altercation concerned a custody dispute over the 5-month-old child. Phoenix Police accused him of pushing her with two hands, causing her to fall and break her right collarbone. On March 24, 2014, he pleaded guilty to the crime of aggravated assault, a class 6 felony. Washington was sentenced to one-year of supervised probation on April 23, 2014.
