= Kelvin Sheppard =

American football player and coach (born 1988)

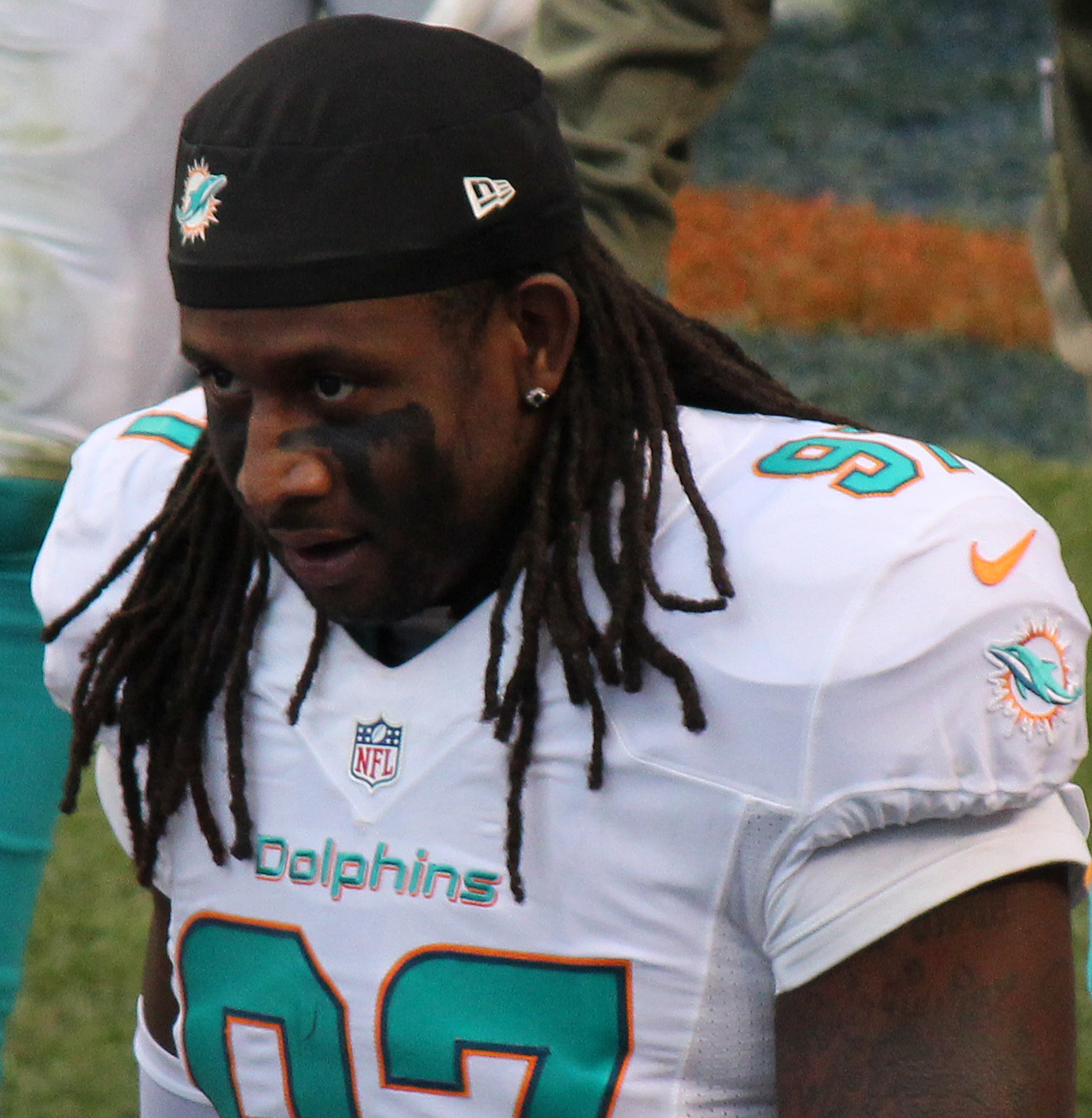
- Sheppard with the Miami Dolphins in 2014

Detroit Lions
- Title: Defensive coordinator

Personal information
- Born: January 2, 1988 (age 38); Atlanta, Georgia, U.S.
- Listed height: 6 ft 2 in (1.88 m)
- Listed weight: 249 lb (113 kg)

Career information
- Position: Linebacker (No. 55, 52, 97, 91, 47, 51)
- High school: Stephenson (Stone Mountain, Georgia)
- College: LSU
- NFL draft: 2011: 3rd round, 68th overall pick

Career history

Playing
- Buffalo Bills (2011–2012); Indianapolis Colts (2013); Miami Dolphins (2014–2015); New York Giants (2016); Chicago Bears (2017)*; New York Giants (2017); Detroit Lions (2018)
- * Offseason or practice squad member only

Coaching
- Detroit Lions (2021–present); Outside linebackers coach (2021); Linebackers coach (2022–2024); Defensive coordinator (2025–present)

Operations
- LSU (2020) Director of player development

Awards and highlights
- BCS national champion (2007); First-team All-SEC (2010)

Career NFL statistics
- Total tackles: 429
- Sacks: 3.0
- Forced fumbles: 1
- Fumble recoveries: 1
- Interceptions: 2
- Stats at Pro Football Reference
- Coaching profile at Pro Football Reference

Kelvin Anthony Sheppard (born January 2, 1988) is an American professional football coach and former linebacker who is the defensive coordinator for the Detroit Lions of the National Football League (NFL). He previously played in the NFL for 8 seasons. Sheppard played college football for the LSU Tigers and was selected by the Buffalo Bills in the third round of the 2011 NFL draft. He was also a member of the Indianapolis Colts, Miami Dolphins, New York Giants, Chicago Bears and Detroit Lions.

After retiring as a player, Sheppard pursued a coaching career, which he began as the director of player development at Louisiana State University (LSU) in 2020. Sheppard joined the Detroit Lions as their outside linebackers coach in 2021 and coached the linebackers from 2022 to 2024 before being named their defensive coordinator in 2025.

== Early life and college career ==
Sheppard is a native of Stone Mountain, GA. Born to Kelvin and Tamara Sheppard, Sheppard attended Stephenson High School and was one of the top linebackers in the state of Georgia. Sheppard also participated in track and basketball and was named to the Atlanta-Constitution's Top 50 high school athletes. He attended Louisiana State University as a true freshman in 2006 and played a back-up linebacker role as a redshirt freshman in 2007. He started as a sophomore, playing all 13 games and starting at 5. As a senior, Sheppard started all 13 games in which the team earned a top 10 final ranking.

== Playing career ==
=== National Football League ===
Pre-draft measurables
Height	Weight	Arm length	Hand span	Wingspan	40-yard dash	10-yard split	20-yard split	20-yard shuttle	Three-cone drill	Vertical jump	Broad jump	Bench press
6 ft 1 7/8 in (1.88 m)	250 lb (113 kg)	31 3/4 in (0.81 m)	9 5/8 in (0.24 m)	6 ft 5 in (1.96 m)	4.70 s	1.66 s	2.76 s	4.28 s	7.25 s	33.5 in (0.85 m)	9 ft 2 in (2.79 m)	22 reps
All values from NFL Combine/LSU’s Pro Day

==== Buffalo Bills ====
The Buffalo Bills selected Sheppard in the third round (68th overall) of the 2011 NFL draft.

==== Indianapolis Colts ====
On April 29, 2013, Sheppard was traded to the Indianapolis Colts for Jerry Hughes. He played in 15 games with seven starts in 2013, recording 46 tackles and one sack.

On August 30, 2014, Sheppard was released by the Colts.

==== Miami Dolphins ====
On September 8, 2014, Sheppard signed with the Miami Dolphins. In 2015, Sheppard played in all 16 games with 13 starts, recording a career-high 105 tackles.

==== New York Giants (first stint) ====
On April 11, 2016, Sheppard signed with the New York Giants. He played in all 16 games, starting 10, recording 50 tackles and two passes defensed.

==== Chicago Bears ====
On August 18, 2017, Sheppard signed with the Chicago Bears. He was released on September 2, 2017.

==== New York Giants (second stint) ====
On November 7, 2017, Sheppard signed with the Giants. Sheppard recorded his first and second career interceptions on December 31, 2017, during Week 17 when he picked off Washington Redskins quarterback Kirk Cousins twice.

==== Detroit Lions ====
On October 31, 2018, Sheppard was signed by the Detroit Lions.

== NFL career statistics ==
Legend
**Bold**	Career high

=== Regular season ===
Year	Team	Games		Tackles					Interceptions					Fumbles			
Year	Team	GP	GS	Cmb	Solo	Ast	Sck	TFL	Int	Yds	TD	Lng	PD	FF	FR	Yds	TD
2011	BUF	**16**	9	70	46	24	0.0	3	0	0	0	0	1	0	**1**	0	0
2012	BUF	**16**	**15**	80	56	24	**2.0**	3	0	0	0	0	1	0	0	0	0
2013	IND	15	7	46	20	26	1.0	3	0	0	0	0	1	0	0	0	0
2014	MIA	14	1	24	17	7	0.0	1	0	0	0	0	0	**1**	0	0	0
2015	MIA	**16**	13	**105**	**75**	**30**	0.0	**13**	0	0	0	0	2	0	0	0	0
2016	NYG	**16**	11	50	30	20	0.0	0	0	0	0	0	2	0	0	0	0
2017	NYG	7	6	49	32	17	0.0	2	**2**	**17**	0	**12**	**4**	0	0	0	0
2018	DET	7	1	5	5	0	0.0	0	0	0	0	0	0	0	0	0	0
Career		107	63	429	281	148	3.0	25	2	17	0	12	11	1	1	0	0

=== Playoffs ===
Year	Team	Games		Tackles					Interceptions					Fumbles			
Year	Team	GP	GS	Cmb	Solo	Ast	Sck	TFL	Int	Yds	TD	Lng	PD	FF	FR	Yds	TD
2013	IND	**2**	**2**	**11**	**3**	**8**	0.0	0	0	0	0	0	0	0	**1**	0	0
2016	NYG	1	0	0	0	0	0.0	0	0	0	0	0	0	0	0	0	0
Career		3	2	11	3	8	0.0	0	0	0	0	0	0	0	1	0	0

== Coaching career ==
=== LSU ===
In March 2020, Sheppard was named director of player development at Louisiana State University. He replaced Kevin Faulk who held the position prior to Sheppard.

=== Detroit Lions ===
On February 3, 2021, Sheppard was hired by the Detroit Lions as their outside linebackers coach under head coach Dan Campbell. In 2022, Sheppard went from coaching the outside linebackers to the entire linebackers unit. On January 30, 2025, Sheppard was promoted to defensive coordinator, replacing Aaron Glenn, after his departure to become head coach of the New York Jets.

== Personal life ==
Sheppard is the first cousin of retired NFL wide receiver, Dwayne Harris. He has two children.
