= Matt King (American football) =

American gridiron football player (born 1983)

No. 42
- Position: Linebacker

Personal information
- Born: July 13, 1983 (age 43); Boston, Massachusetts
- Listed height: 6 ft 3 in (1.91 m)
- Listed weight: 245 lb (111 kg)

Career information
- College: Maine
- NFL draft: 2007: undrafted

Career history
- New York Jets (2007)*; Pittsburgh Steelers (2007)*; Georgia Force (2008); Hamilton Tiger-Cats (2008); Manchester Wolves (2009)
- * Offseason or practice squad member only
- Stats at ArenaFan.com

Matt King (born July 13, 1983) is a former professional American, Canadian, and Arena Football linebacker.

He was signed as an un-drafted rookie free agent by the New York Jets in 2007. He later signed with the NFL's Pittsburgh Steelers. He played his college football at the University of Maine where he was a consensus First Team All-America selection. King has also been a member of the Hamilton Tiger-Cats of the CFL, the Georgia Force of the AFL, and the Manchester Wolves of the now defunct AF2 League.
