= 2012 Arizona Cardinals season =

NFL team season

- Owner: Bill Bidwill
- General manager: Rod Graves
- Head coach: Ken Whisenhunt
- Home stadium: University of Phoenix Stadium

Results
- Record: 5–11
- Division place: 4th NFC West
- Playoffs: Did not qualify
- Pro Bowlers: WR Larry Fitzgerald; LB Daryl Washington; CB Patrick Peterson

Uniform
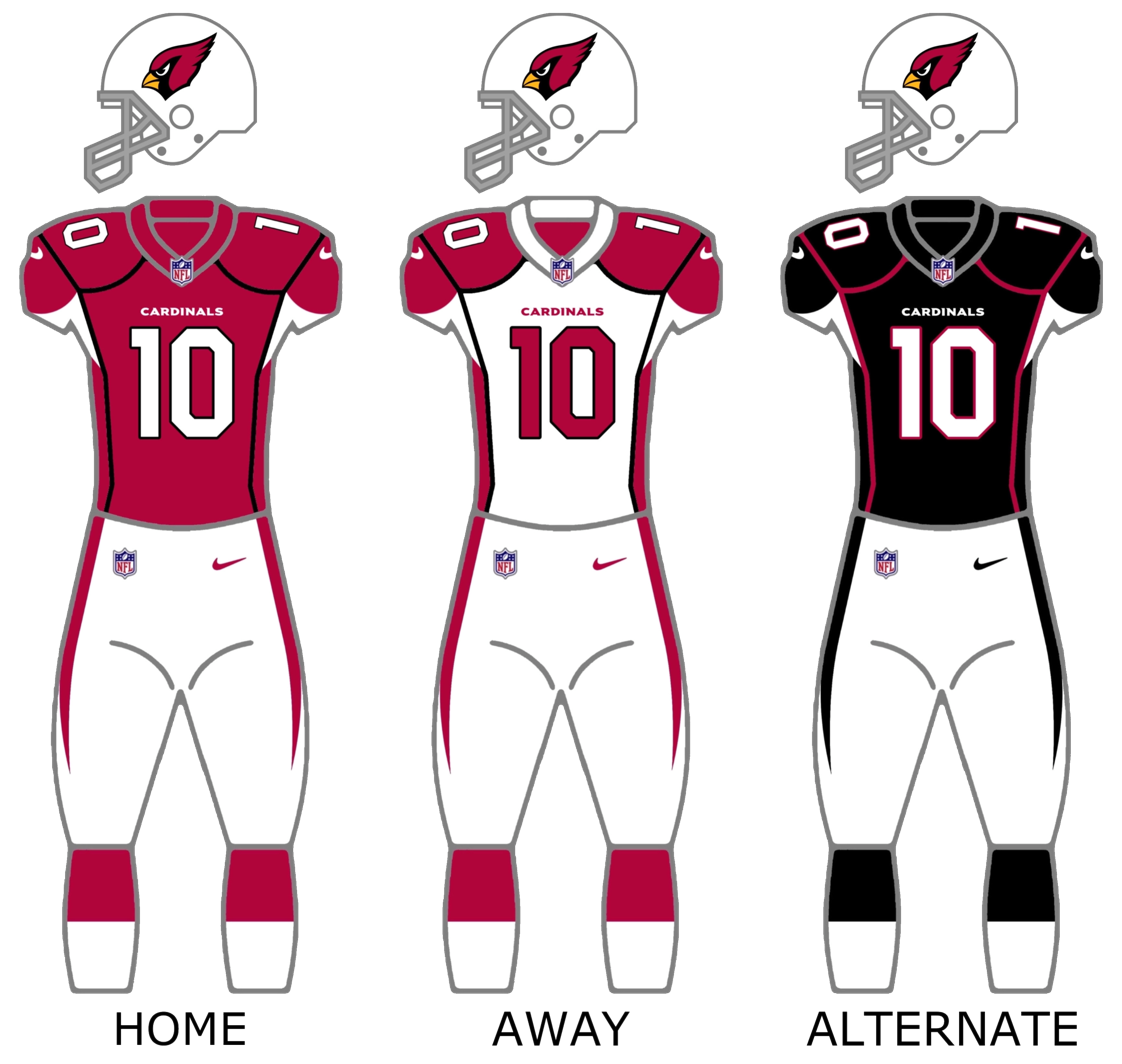

The 2012 season was the Arizona Cardinals' 93rd in the National Football League (NFL), their 25th in Arizona, and their sixth and final season under head coach Ken Whisenhunt. After a surprising 4–0 start, which included a major upset of the New England Patriots in week 2, the Cardinals lost 11 of their final 12 games, and missed the playoffs for a third consecutive season, resulting in the firing of head coach Ken Whisenhunt after six seasons. This was Rod Graves' last season as general manager of the Cardinals. A day after the final game of the regular season, he was fired after 6 seasons.

== 2012 draft class ==
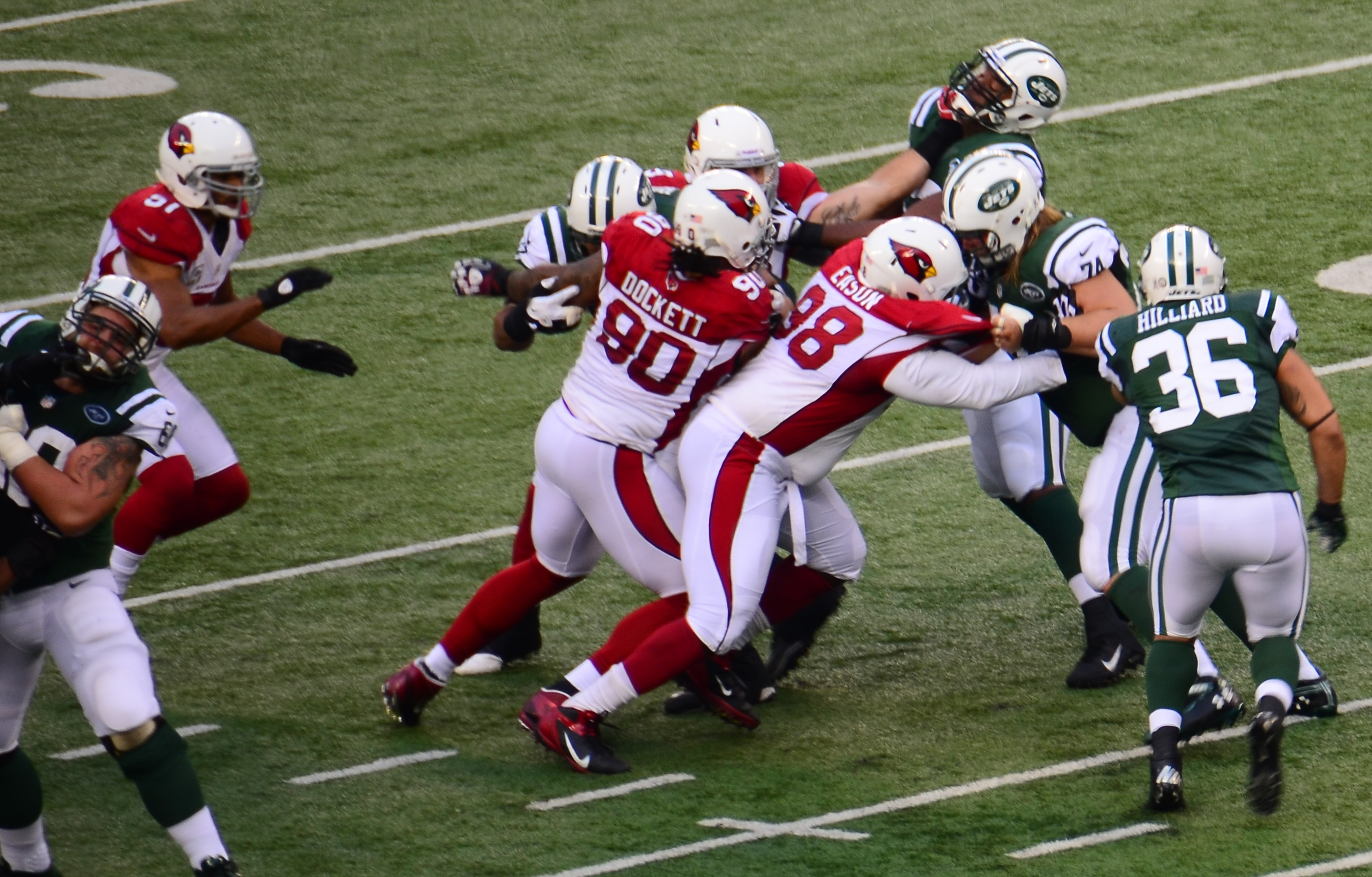
Arizona at the New York Jets in week 13

2012 Arizona Cardinals draft
Round	Pick	Player	Position	College	Notes
1	13	Michael Floyd	Wide receiver	Notre Dame	
3	80	Jamell Fleming	Defensive back	Oklahoma	
4	112	Bobby Massie	Tackle	Ole Miss	
5	151	Senio Kelemete	Guard	Washington	
6	177	Justin Bethel *	Defensive back	Presbyterian	The Cardinals acquired this sixth-round selection (No. 177 overall) and defensive end Vonnie Holliday in a trade that sent running back Tim Hightower to the Washington Redskins.
6	185	Ryan Lindley	Quarterback	San Diego State	
7	221	Nate Potter	Tackle	Boise State	
Made roster * Made at least one Pro Bowl during career

(Note: The Cardinals traded their second-round selection and cornerback Dominique Rodgers-Cromartie to the Philadelphia Eagles in exchange for quarterback Kevin Kolb.)

== Staff ==
2012 Arizona Cardinals staff
Front office: Owner/chairman – Bill Bidwill; President – Michael Bidwill; general manager – Rod Graves; Director of football administration – Reggie Terry; Director of player personnel – Steve Keim; Director of pro personnel – Jason Licht; Assistant director of pro personnel – Quentin Harris; Head coaches: Head coach – Ken Whisenhunt; Assistant head coach/run game coordinator/offensive line – Russ Grimm; Offensive coaches: Offensive coordinator – Mike Miller; Quarterbacks – John McNulty; Running backs – Tommie Robinson; Wide receivers – Frank Reich; Tight ends – Freddie Kitchens; Offensive quality control – Chad Grimm	Defensive coaches: Defensive coordinator – Ray Horton; Defensive line – Ron Aiken; Linebackers – Matt Raich; Defensive backs – Louie Cioffi; Assistant defensive backs – Deshea Townsend; Defensive quality control – Ryan Slowik; Special teams coaches: Special teams – Kevin Spencer; Strength and conditioning: Strength and conditioning – John Lott; Assistant strength and conditioning – Pete Alosi

== Final roster ==
2012 Arizona Cardinals roster
Quarterbacks (QB): 6 Brian Hoyer; 14 Ryan Lindley; 19 John Skelton; Running backs (RB): 33 William Powell; 35 Anthony Sherman FB; 29 Alfonso Smith; 36 LaRod Stephens-Howling; 26 Beanie Wells; Wide receivers (WR): 17 LaRon Byrd; 85 Early Doucet; 11 Larry Fitzgerald; 15 Michael Floyd; 12 Andre Roberts; 18 Kerry Taylor; Tight ends (TE): 81 Jim Dray; 87 Jeff King; 83 Kory Sperry	Offensive linemen (OL): 74 D'Anthony Batiste T; 71 Daryn Colledge G; 69 Mike Gibson G; 64 Senio Kelemete G; 70 Bobby Massie T; 67 Pat McQuistan G; 76 Nate Potter T; 68 Adam Snyder G/C; 66 Scott Wedige C; Defensive linemen (DL): 93 Calais Campbell DE; 79 David Carter; 90 Darnell Dockett DE; 98 Nick Eason; 91 Vonnie Holliday DE; 96 Ronald Talley DE; 92 Dan Williams NT	Linebackers (LB): 94 Sam Acho OLB; 55 Stewart Bradley ILB; 54 Quentin Groves OLB; 51 Paris Lenon ILB; 59 Zack Nash OLB; 56 Reggie Walker ILB; 58 Daryl Washington ILB; Defensive backs (DB): 27 Michael Adams CB; 31 Justin Bethel CB; 23 Jamell Fleming CB; 22 William Gay CB; 49 Rashad Johnson S; 21 Patrick Peterson CB; 25 Kerry Rhodes FS; 39 James Sanders SS; 28 Greg Toler CB; 24 Adrian Wilson SS; Special teams (ST): 3 Jay Feely K; 82 Mike Leach LS; 9 Dave Zastudil P	Practice squad: 78 Steven Baker T; 53 Tim Fugger LB; 95 Ricky Lumpkin NT; 20 Greg McCoy CB; 52 Colin Parker LB; 10 Gerell Robinson WR; 60 Everrette Thompson DE; 32 Fozzy Whittaker RB; Reserve: 62 Ryan Bartholomew C (IR); 75 Levi Brown T (IR); 65 Blake DeChristopher G (IR); 84 Rob Housler TE (IR); 45 Javarris James RB (IR); 4 Kevin Kolb QB (IR); 72 Rich Ohrnberger C (IR); 50 O'Brien Schofield OLB/DE (IR); 63 Lyle Sendlein C (IR); -- Brandon Williams LB (IR); 34 Ryan Williams RB (IR); Rookies in italics 53 active, 11 reserve, 8 practice squad

== Preseason ==
=== Schedule ===
Week	Date	Opponent	Result	Record	Venue	Recap
HOF	August 5	vs. New Orleans Saints	L 10–17	0–1	Fawcett Stadium (Canton, Ohio)	Recap
1	August 10	at Kansas City Chiefs	L 17–27	0–2	Arrowhead Stadium	Recap
2	August 17	Oakland Raiders	W 31–27	1–2	University of Phoenix Stadium	Recap
3	August 23	at Tennessee Titans	L 27–32	1–3	LP Field	Recap
4	August 30	Denver Broncos	L 13–16	1–4	University of Phoenix Stadium	Recap

== Regular season ==
=== Schedule ===
Week	Date	Opponent	Result	Record	Venue	Recap
1	September 9	**Seattle Seahawks**	**W** 20–16	1–0	University of Phoenix Stadium	Recap
2	September 16	at New England Patriots	**W** 20–18	2–0	Gillette Stadium	Recap
3	September 23	Philadelphia Eagles	**W** 27–6	3–0	University of Phoenix Stadium	Recap
4	September 30	Miami Dolphins	**W** 24–21 (OT)	4–0	University of Phoenix Stadium	Recap
5	October 4	at **St. Louis Rams**	**L** 3–17	4–1	Edward Jones Dome	Recap
6	October 14	Buffalo Bills	**L** 16–19 (OT)	4–2	University of Phoenix Stadium	Recap
7	October 21	at Minnesota Vikings	**L** 14–21	4–3	Hubert H. Humphrey Metrodome	Recap
8	October 29	**San Francisco 49ers**	**L** 3–24	4–4	University of Phoenix Stadium	Recap
9	November 4	at Green Bay Packers	**L** 17–31	4–5	Lambeau Field	Recap
10	Bye					
11	November 18	at Atlanta Falcons	**L** 19–23	4–6	Georgia Dome	Recap
12	November 25	**St. Louis Rams**	**L** 17–31	4–7	University of Phoenix Stadium	Recap
13	December 2	at New York Jets	**L** 6–7	4–8	MetLife Stadium	Recap
14	December 9	at **Seattle Seahawks**	**L** 0–58	4–9	CenturyLink Field	Recap
15	December 16	Detroit Lions	**W** 38–10	5–9	University of Phoenix Stadium	Recap
16	December 23	Chicago Bears	**L** 13–28	5–10	University of Phoenix Stadium	Recap
17	December 30	at **San Francisco 49ers**	**L** 13–27	5–11	Candlestick Park	Recap

Note: Intra-division opponents are in bold text.

=== Game summaries ===
==== Week 1: vs. Seattle Seahawks ====
Week One: Seattle Seahawks at Arizona Cardinals – Game summary

Quarter	1	2	3	4	Total
Seahawks	3	0	10	3	**16**
**Cardinals**	3	7	3	7	**20**

at University of Phoenix Stadium, Glendale, Arizona

- Date: September 9
- Game time: 1:25 pm. MDT
- Game weather: Played indoors (retractable roof closed)
- Game attendance: 60,032
- Referee: Bruce Hermansen
- TV announcers (Fox): Sam Rosen, Heath Evans and Heidi Androl

Game information

**First quarter**

- SEA – Stephen Hauschka 27-yard field goal, 7:26. Seahawks 3–0. **Drive: 7 plays, 33 yards, 2:58.**
- ARI – Jay Feely 21-yard field goal, 0:34. Tied 3–3. **Drive: 13 plays, 75 yards, 6:52.**

**Second quarter**

- ARI – LaRod Stephens-Howling 1-yard run (Jay Feely kick), 5:58. Cardinals 10–3. **Drive: 11 plays, 58 yards, 5:22.**

**Third quarter**

- ARI – Jay Feely 31-yard field goal, 9:59. Cardinals 13–3. **Drive: 4 plays, 4 yards, 1:04.**
- SEA – Sidney Rice 10-yard pass from Russell Wilson (Stephen Hauschka kick), 7:51. Cardinals 13–10. **Drive: 5 plays, 24 yards, 2:08.**
- SEA – Stephen Hauschka 47-yard field goal, 5:13. Tied 13–13. **Drive: 4 plays, 5 yards, 2:29.**

**Fourth quarter**

- SEA – Stephen Hauschka 39-yard field goal, 9:20. Seahawks 16–13. **Drive: 4 plays, -5 yards, 1:38.**
- ARI – Andre Roberts 6-yard pass from Kevin Kolb (Jay Feely kick), 4:59. Cardinals 20–16. **Drive: 11 plays, 80 yards, 4:21.**

**Top passers**

- ARI – John Skelton – 14/28, 149 yards, 1 INT
- SEA – Russell Wilson – 18/34, 153 yards, 1 TD, 1 INT

**Top rushers**

- ARI – Andre Roberts – 1 rush, 15 yards
- SEA – Marshawn Lynch – 21 rushes, 85 yards

**Top receivers**

- ARI – Larry Fitzgerald – 4 rec, 63 yards
- SEA – Sidney Rice – 4 rec, 36 yards, 1 TD

The Cardinals began their season at home against their divisional rival Seahawks with quarterback John Skelton at the starting helm. The team started their season 1–0 despite Skelton finishing the game 14/28 for 149 yards and an interception. Kevin Kolb later on made an appearance in relief of Skelton going 6/8 for 66 yards and a touchdown pass.

==== Week 2: at New England Patriots ====
Week Two: Arizona Cardinals at New England Patriots – Game summary

Quarter	1	2	3	4	Total
**Cardinals**	6	0	7	7	**20**
Patriots	3	3	3	9	**18**

at Gillette Stadium, Foxborough, Massachusetts

- Date: September 16
- Game time: 1:00 pm. EDT/10:00 a.m MDT
- Game weather: 64 °F (18 °C), partly cloudy
- Game attendance: 68,756
- Referee: David Scott
- TV announcers (Fox): Dick Stockton, John Lynch and Jennifer Hale

Game information

**First quarter**

- ARI – Jay Feely 38-yard field goal, 8:42. Cardinals 3–0. **Drive: 13 plays, 60 yards, 6:18.**
- ARI – Jay Feely 47-yard field goal, 7:42. Cardinals 6–0. **Drive: 4 plays, 2 yards, 0:49.**
- NE – Stephen Gostkowski 46-yard field goal, 2:22. Cardinals 6–3. **Drive: 11 plays, 47 yards, 5:20.**

**Second quarter**

- NE – Stephen Gostkowski 34-yard field goal, 9:08. Tied 6–6. **Drive: 7 plays, 36 yards, 3:32.**

**Third quarter**

- NE – Stephen Gostkowski 51-yard field goal, 12:53. Patriots 9–6. **Drive: 7 plays, 47 yards, 2:07.**
- ARI – Andre Roberts 2-yard pass from Kevin Kolb (Jay Feely kick), 8:52. Cardinals 13–9. **Drive: 3 plays, 2 yards, 0:49.**

**Fourth quarter**

- ARI – Kevin Kolb 5-yard run (Jay Feely kick), 14:00. Cardinals 20–9. **Drive: 9 plays, 42 yards, 3:46.**
- NE – Stephen Gostkowski 53-yard field goal, 6:45. Cardinals 20–12. **Drive: 6 plays, 29 yards, 1:11.**
- NE – Rob Gronkowski 5-yard pass from Tom Brady (pass failed), 2:06. Cardinals 20–18. **Drive: 11 plays, 82 yards, 3:36.**

**Top passers**

- ARI – Kevin Kolb – 15/27, 140 yards, 1 TD
- NE – Tom Brady – 28/46, 316 yards, 1 TD, 1 INT

**Top rushers**

- ARI – Beanie Wells – 14 rushes, 44 yards
- NE – Stevan Ridley – 18 rushes, 71 yards

**Top receivers**

- ARI – Todd Heap – 5 rec, 62 yards
- NE – Wes Welker – 5 rec, 95 yards

In a huge upset at Gillette Stadium, the Cardinals beat the Patriots to become 2–0. This was the Cardinals' first win against the Patriots since 1991. This would be their last win over New England until 2024.

==== Week 3: vs. Philadelphia Eagles ====
Week Three: Philadelphia Eagles at Arizona Cardinals – Game summary

Quarter	1	2	3	4	Total
Eagles	0	0	6	0	**6**
**Cardinals**	10	14	0	3	**27**

at University of Phoenix Stadium, Glendale, Arizona

- Date: September 23
- Game time: 1:05 pm. MDT
- Game weather: Played indoors (retractable roof closed)
- Game attendance: 60,436
- Referee: Mike Shepherd
- TV announcers (Fox): Thom Brennaman, Brian Billick and Laura Okmin

Game information

**First quarter**

- ARI – Jay Feely 47-yard field goal, 10:18. Cardinals 3–0. **Drive: 8 plays, 36 yards, 3:47.**
- ARI – Michael Floyd 8-yard pass from Kevin Kolb (Jay Feely kick), 1:04. Cardinals 10–0. **Drive: 12 plays, 34 yards, 3:32.**

**Second quarter**

- ARI – Larry Fitzgerald 37-yard pass from Kevin Kolb (Jay Feely kick), 7:30. Cardinals 17–0. **Drive: 4 plays, 55 yards, 1:32.**
- ARI – James Sanders 98-yard fumble return (Jay Feely kick), 0:00. Cardinals 24–0.

**Third quarter**

- PHI – Alex Henery 36-yard field goal, 5:07. Cardinals 24–3. **Drive: 13 plays, 77 yards, 6:30.**
- PHI Alex Henery 40-yard field goal, 0:02. Cardinals 24–6. **Drive: 8 plays, 33 yards, 3:12.**

**Fourth quarter**

- ARI – Jay Feely 27-yard field goal, 3:52. Cardinals 27–6. **Drive: 13 plays, 63 yards, 6:34.**

**Top passers**

- PHI – Michael Vick – 17/37, 217 yards
- ARI – Kevin Kolb – 17/24, 222 yards, 2 TD

**Top rushers**

- PHI – LeSean McCoy – 13 rushes, 70 yards
- ARI – Ryan Williams – 13 rushes, 83 yards

**Top receivers**

- PHI – Damaris Johnson – 5 rec, 84 yards
- ARI – Larry Fitzgerald – 9 rec, 113 yards, TD

With the win, the Cardinals started 3–0 for the first time since 1974.

==== Week 4: vs. Miami Dolphins ====
Week Four: Miami Dolphins at Arizona Cardinals – Game summary

Quarter	1	2	3	4	OT	Total
Dolphins	0	13	0	8	0	**21**
**Cardinals**	0	0	7	14	3	**24**

at University of Phoenix Stadium, Glendale, Arizona

- Date: September 30
- Game time: 1:05 pm. MDT
- Game weather: Played indoors (retractable roof closed)
- Game attendance: 60,183
- Referee: Scott Green
- TV announcers (CBS): Bill Macatee and Steve Tasker

Game information

**First quarter**

- No scoring plays

**Second quarter**

- MIA – Dan Carpenter 32-yard field goal, 13:15. Dolphins 3–0. **Drive: 14 plays, 64 yards, 5:49.**
- MIA – Jorvorskie Lane 1-yard run (Dan Carpenter kick), 1:56. Dolphins 10–0. **Drive: 8 plays, 95 yards, 3:49.**
- MIA – Dan Carpenter 27-yard field goal, 0:03. Dolphins 13–0. **Drive: 3 plays, 25 yards, 0:24.**

**Third quarter**

- ARI – Larry Fitzgerald 3-yard pass from Kevin Kolb (Jay Feely kick), 9:46. Dolphins 13–7. **Drive: 8 plays, 59 yards, 2:57.**

**Fourth quarter**

- ARI – Andre Roberts 46-yard pass from Kevin Kolb (Jay Feely kick), 9:45. Cardinals 14–13. **Drive: 3 plays, 81 yards, 1:27.**
- MIA – Brian Hartline 80-yard pass from Ryan Tannehill (Jorvorskie Lane pass from Ryan Tannehill), 7:05. Dolphins 21–14. **Drive: 1 play, 80 yards, 0:08.**
- ARI – Andre Roberts 15-yard pass from Kevin Kolb (Jay Feely kick), 0:22. Tied 21–21. **Drive: 10 plays, 51 yards, 2:29.**

**Overtime**

- ARI – Jay Feely 46-yard field goal, 8:29. Cardinals 24–21. **Drive: 7 plays, 19 yards, 3:30.**

**Top passers**

- MIA – Ryan Tannehill – 26/41, 431 yards, 1 TD, 2 INT
- ARI – Kevin Kolb – 29/48, 324 yards, 3 TD, 2 INT

**Top rushers**

- MIA – Reggie Bush – 17 rushes, 67 yards
- ARI – Ryan Williams – 13 rushes, 26 yards

**Top receivers**

- MIA – Brian Hartline – 12 rec, 253 yards, 1 TD
- ARI – Andre Roberts – 6 rec, 118 yards, 2 TD

==== Week 5: at St. Louis Rams ====
Week Five: Arizona Cardinals at St. Louis Rams – Game summary

Quarter	1	2	3	4	Total
Cardinals	3	0	0	0	**3**
**Rams**	7	3	0	7	**17**

at Edward Jones Dome, St. Louis, Missouri

- Date: October 4
- Game time: 7:20 pm. CDT/5:20 pm. MDT
- Game weather: Played indoors (dome stadium)
- Game attendance: 54,653
- Referee: John Parry
- TV announcers (NFLN): Brad Nessler, Mike Mayock and Alex Flanagan

Game information

**First quarter**

- STL – Lance Kendricks 7-yard pass from Sam Bradford (Greg Zuerlein kick), 12:39. Rams 7–0. 'Drive:
- ARI – Jay Feely 35-yard field goal, 3:15. Rams 7–3. 'Drive:

**Second quarter**

- STL – Greg Zuerlein 53-yard field goal, 10:45. Rams 10–3. 'Drive:

**Third quarter**

- No scoring plays

**Fourth quarter**

- STL – Chris Givens 51-yard pass from Sam Bradford (Greg Zuerlein kick), 11:49. Rams 17–3. 'Drive:

**Top passers**

- STL – Sam Bradford – 7/21, 141 yards, 2 TD, 1 INT
- ARI – Kevin Kolb – 28/50, 289 yards

**Top rushers**

- STL – Steven Jackson – 18 rushes, 76 yards
- ARI – Ryan Williams – 14 rushes, 33 yards

**Top receivers**

- STL – Chris Givens – 1 rec, 51 yards, 1 TD
- ARI – Larry Fitzgerald – 8 rec, 92 yards

This was the Cardinals' 700th loss. They became the first team in NFL history to do this.

==== Week 6: vs. Buffalo Bills ====
Week Six: Buffalo Bills at Arizona Cardinals – Game summary

Quarter	1	2	3	4	OT	Total
**Bills**	9	0	7	0	3	**19**
Cardinals	3	7	3	3	0	**16**

at University of Phoenix Stadium, Glendale, Arizona

- Date: October 14
- Game time: 1:05 pm. MDT
- Game weather: Played indoors (retractable roof closed)
- Game attendance: 60,385
- Referee: Alberto Riveron
- TV announcers (CBS): Bill Macatee and Steve Tasker

With the tough loss, the Cardinals fell to 4–2 and also with the Seahawks' win over the Patriots and the 49ers' loss to the Giants, the team remained in a tie for first place in the NFC West.

==== Week 7: at Minnesota Vikings ====
Week Seven: Arizona Cardinals at Minnesota Vikings – Game summary

Quarter	1	2	3	4	Total
Cardinals	0	7	0	7	**14**
**Vikings**	7	7	7	0	**21**

at Mall of America Field at the Hubert H. Humphrey Metrodome, Minneapolis, Minnesota

- Date: October 21
- Game time: 12:00 pm. CDT/10:00 am. MDT
- Game weather: Played indoors (dome stadium)
- Game attendance: 61,068
- Referee: Terry McAulay
- TV announcers (Fox): Chris Myers, Tim Ryan and Jaime Maggio

==== Week 8: vs. San Francisco 49ers ====
Week Eight: San Francisco 49ers at Arizona Cardinals – Game summary

Quarter	1	2	3	4	Total
**49ers**	7	10	7	0	**24**
Cardinals	0	0	3	0	**3**

at University of Phoenix Stadium, Glendale, Arizona

- Date: October 29
- Game time: 5:30 pm. MDT
- Game weather: 90 °F (32 °C), sunny & clear skies (retractable roof open)
- Game attendance: 62,810
- Referee: Bill Leavy
- TV announcers (ESPN): Mike Tirico, Jon Gruden and Lisa Salters

==== Week 9: at Green Bay Packers ====
Week Nine: Arizona Cardinals at Green Bay Packers – Game summary

Quarter	1	2	3	4	Total
Cardinals	0	7	10	0	**17**
**Packers**	7	14	10	0	**31**

at Lambeau Field, Green Bay, Wisconsin

- Date: November 4
- Game time: 12:00 pm. CST/11:00 am. MST
- Game weather: 39 °F (4 °C), mostly cloudy
- Game attendance: 70,504
- Referee: Walt Coleman
- TV announcers (Fox): Joe Buck, Troy Aikman and Pam Oliver

Losing their fifth straight game of the season by remaining winless at Lambeau Field (0–7), the Cardinals headed into their bye week at 4–5.

==== Week 11: at Atlanta Falcons ====
Week Eleven: Arizona Cardinals at Atlanta Falcons – Game summary

Quarter	1	2	3	4	Total
Cardinals	13	3	0	3	**19**
**Falcons**	0	16	0	7	**23**

at Georgia Dome, Atlanta, Georgia

- Date: November 18
- Game time: 1:00 pm. EST/11:00 am. MST
- Game weather: Played indoors (dome stadium)
- Game attendance: 69,630
- Referee: Bill Vinovich
- TV announcers (Fox): Kenny Albert, Daryl Johnston and Tony Siragusa

==== Week 12: vs. St. Louis Rams ====
Week Twelve: St. Louis Rams at Arizona Cardinals – Game summary

Quarter	1	2	3	4	Total
**Rams**	0	14	14	3	**31**
Cardinals	7	10	0	0	**17**

at University of Phoenix Stadium, Glendale, Arizona

- Date: November 25
- Game time: 2:25 pm. MST
- Game weather: Played indoors (retractable roof closed)
- Game attendance: 60,062
- Referee: Tony Corrente
- TV announcers (Fox): Dick Stockton, John Lynch and Jennifer Hale

With their 7th straight loss the Cardinals were swept by the Rams and fell to 4-7.

==== Week 13: at New York Jets ====
Week Thirteen: Arizona Cardinals at New York Jets – Game summary

Quarter	1	2	3	4	Total
Cardinals	0	3	0	3	**6**
**Jets**	0	0	0	7	**7**

at MetLife Stadium, East Rutherford, New Jersey

- Date: December 2
- Game time: 1:00 pm. EST/11:00 am. MST
- Game weather: 46 °F (8 °C), cloudy
- Game attendance: 79,088
- Referee: Walt Anderson
- TV announcers (Fox): Thom Brennaman, Brian Billick and Laura Okmin

Game information

**First quarter**

- No scoring plays

**Second quarter**

- ARI – Jay Feely 48-yard field goal, 0:03. Cardinals 3–0. **Drive: 10 plays, 61 yards, 2:31.**

**Third quarter**

- No scoring plays

**Fourth quarter**

- NYJ – Jeff Cumberland 1-yard pass from Greg McElroy (Nick Folk kick), 14:55. Jets 7–3. **Drive: 10 plays, 66 yards, 4:53.**
- ARI – Jay Feely 35-yard field goal, 10:39. Jets 7–6. **Drive: 6 plays, 21 yards, 2:03.**

**Top passers**

- ARI – Ryan Lindley – 10/31, 72 yards, INT
- NYJ – Mark Sanchez – 10/21, 97 yards, 3 INT

**Top rushers**

- ARI – Rashad Johnson – 1 rush, 40 yards
- NYJ – Shonn Greene – 24 rushes, 104 yards

**Top receivers**

- ARI – Larry Fitzgerald – 1 reception, 23 yards
- NYJ – Stephen Hill – 5 receptions, 40 yards

In a game most remembered as possibly the worst QB duel in NFL history, the Cardinals fell 7-6 marking their 8th straight loss.

==== Week 14: at Seattle Seahawks ====
Week Fourteen: Arizona Cardinals at Seattle Seahawks – Game summary

Quarter	1	2	3	4	Total
Cardinals	0	0	0	0	**0**
**Seahawks**	10	28	13	7	**58**

at CenturyLink Field, Seattle, Washington

- Date: December 9
- Game time: 2:25 pm. MST
- Game weather: 48 °F (9 °C), rain
- Game attendance: 67,685
- Referee: Carl Cheffers
- TV announcers (Fox): Chris Myers, Tim Ryan, and Jaime Maggio

Game information

**First quarter**

- SEA – Stephen Hauschka 31-yard field goal, 10:04. Seahawks 3–0. **Drive: 4 plays, 1 yard, 2:01.**
- SEA – Marshawn Lynch 20-yard run (Stephen Hauschka kick), 2:04. Seahawks 10–0. **Drive: 11 plays, 70 yards, 6:14.**

**Second quarter**

- SEA – Marshawn Lynch 4-yard run (Stephen Hauschka kick), 14:53. Seahawks 17–0. **Drive: 3 plays, 72 yards, 1:11.**
- SEA – Richard Sherman 19-yard interception return (Stephen Hauschka kick), 10:12. Seahawks 24–0.
- SEA – Malcolm Smith fumble recovery (Stephen Hauschka kick), 6:31. Seahawks 31–0.
- SEA – Zach Miller 24-yard pass from Russell Wilson (Stephen Hauschka kick), 0:06. Seahawks 38–0. **Drive: 7 plays, 48 yards, 0:13.**

**Third quarter**

- SEA – Marshawn Lynch 33-yard run (Stephen Hauschka kick), 11:08. Seahawks 45–0. **Drive: 7 plays, 86 yards, 3:52.**
- SEA – Stephen Hauschka 28-yard field goal, 7:47. Seahawks 48–0. **Drive: 6 plays, 15 yards, 2:36.**
- SEA – Stephen Hauschka 32-yard field goal, 2:10. Seahawks 51–0. **Drive: 6 plays, 26 yards, 2:43.**

**Fourth quarter**

- SEA – Leon Washington 3-yard run (Stephen Hauschka kick), 2:32. Seahawks 58–0. **Drive: 6 plays, 62 yards, 2:51.**

**Top passers**

- ARI – John Skelton – 11/24, 74 yards, 4 INT
- SEA – Russell Wilson – 7/13, 148 yards, TD, INT

**Top rushers**

- ARI – William Powell – 5 rushes, 20 yards
- SEA – Marshawn Lynch – 11 rushes, 128 yards, 3 TD

**Top receivers**

- ARI – Andre Roberts – 3 receptions, 36 yards
- SEA – Anthony McCoy – 3 receptions, 105 yards

With the loss, the Cardinals were not only eliminated from postseason contention by falling to 4–9, but the 58-point loss was the worst in franchise history. They committed 8 turnovers, which was the most that the Cardinals have ever committed in a game. Arizona had only 154 yards of total offense while the defense gave up 493 yards.

The Cardinals also became the first team in NFL history to lose 9 consecutive games after starting 4–0.

==== Week 15: vs. Detroit Lions ====
Week Fifteen: Detroit Lions at Arizona Cardinals – Game summary

Quarter	1	2	3	4	Total
Lions	0	7	3	0	**10**
**Cardinals**	0	21	3	14	**38**

at University of Phoenix Stadium, Glendale, Arizona

- Date: December 16
- Game time: 2:05 pm. MST
- Game weather: 57 °F (14 °C), sunny, clear skies (retractable roof open)
- Game attendance: 60,483
- Referee: Jerome Boger
- TV announcers (Fox): Chris Myers, Tim Ryan and Jaime Maggio

With this win, the Cardinals ended their 9 game losing streak.

==== Week 16: vs. Chicago Bears ====
Week Sixteen: Chicago Bears at Arizona Cardinals – Game summary

Quarter	1	2	3	4	Total
**Bears**	7	14	7	0	**28**
Cardinals	3	3	0	7	**13**

at University of Phoenix Stadium, Glendale, Arizona

- Date: December 23
- Game time: 2:25 pm. MST
- Game weather: 62 °F (17 °C), sunny (retractable roof open)
- Game attendance: 62,734
- Referee: Terry McAulay
- TV announcers (Fox): Dick Stockton, John Lynch and Jennifer Hale

==== Week 17: at San Francisco 49ers ====
Week Seventeen: Arizona Cardinals at San Francisco 49ers – Game summary

Quarter	1	2	3	4	Total
Cardinals	3	3	0	7	**13**
**49ers**	0	7	10	10	**27**

at Candlestick Park, San Francisco, California

- Date: December 30
- Game time: 2:25 pm. MST
- Game weather: 50 °F (10 °C), sunny
- Game attendance: 69,732
- Referee: Pete Morelli
- TV announcers (Fox): Gus Johnson, Charles Davis and Kristina Pink

With this loss, the Cardinals surpassed the 1989 Chicago Bears for the worst record by an NFL team starting 4–0.

== Standings ==
NFC West
	W	L	T	PCT	DIV	CONF	PF	PA	STK
^{(2)} San Francisco 49ers	11	4	1	.719	3–2–1	7–4–1	397	273	W1
^{(5)} Seattle Seahawks	11	5	0	.688	3–3	8–4	412	245	W5
St. Louis Rams	7	8	1	.469	4–1–1	6–5–1	299	348	L1
Arizona Cardinals	5	11	0	.313	1–5	3–9	250	357	L2

== Statistics ==
=== Starters ===
Offense

Pos.	Name	GS
QB	John Skelton; Kevin Kolb; Ryan Lindley; Brian Hoyer	6; 5; 4; 1
RB	Beanie Wells; LaRod Stephens-Howling; Ryan Williams	7; 6; 3
FB	Anthony Sherman	13
WR1	Larry Fitzgerald	16
WR2	Andre Roberts	16
TE	Todd Heap; Jeff King	2; 14
LT	D'Anthony Batiste; Nate Potter	10; 6
LG	Daryn Colledge	16
C	Lyle Sendlein; Rich Ohrnberger; Adam Snyder	11; 2; 3
RG	Adam Snyder; Rich Ohrnberger; Pat McQuistan	11; 2; 3
RT	Bobby Massie	16

Defense

Pos.	Name	GS
DE	Calais Campbell; David Carter	13; 3
NT	Dan Williams; David Carter	15; 1
DE	Darnell Dockett; Nick Eason	15; 1
OLB	O'Brien Schofield; Quentin Groves	9; 7
LB	Daryl Washington	16
LB	Paris Lenon	16
OLB	Sam Acho	16
CB	Patrick Peterson	16
SS	Adrian Wilson; Rashad Johnson	15; 1
FS	Kerry Rhodes; Rashad Johnson	15; 1
CB	William Gay	16

Special Teams

Pos.	Name	GS
P	Dave Zastudil	16
K	Jay Feely	16
LS	Mike Leach	16

=== Individual leaders ===
Category	Player(s)	Value
Passing yards	Kevin Kolb	1,169
Passing touchdowns	Kevin Kolb	8
Rushing yards	LaRod Stephens-Howling	356
Rushing touchdowns	Beanie Wells	5
Receptions	Larry Fitzgerald	71
Receiving yards	Larry Fitzgerald	798
Receiving touchdowns	Andre Roberts	5
Kickoff return yards	William Powell	507
Punt return yards	Patrick Peterson	426
Tackles	Daryl Washington	134
Sacks	Daryl Washington	9.0
Forced fumbles	William Gay	4
Interceptions	Patrick Peterson	7

=== Team rankings ===
Category	Value	NFL rank (out of 32)
Passing attempts	608	
Passing completions	337	9th
Passing yards	3,005	28th
Passing touchdowns	11	31st
Interceptions thrown	21	32nd
Rushing attempts	352	32nd
Rushing yards	1,204	32nd
Rushing touchdowns	10	21st
Rushing yards/attempt	3.4	32nd
Total yards of offense	4,209	32nd
Points scored	250	31st
Points allowed	357	17th
Passing yards allowed	3,213	5th
Passing touchdowns allowed	20	10th
Rushing attempts against	506	31st
Rushing yards allowed	2,192	28th
Rushing touchdowns allowed	12	16th
Yards/rush attempt allowed	4.3	22nd
Interceptions made	22	2nd
Fumbles recovered	11	13th
Total yards allowed	5,405	12th

Statistics correct as of the end of the 2012 NFL season
