= Derek Buttles =

American football player (born 1989)

Profile
- Position: Tight end

Personal information
- Born: September 27, 1989 (age 37); Pike, New York, USA

Career information
- College: Maine Black Bears

Career history
- Buffalo Bills (2012)*
- * Offseason or practice squad member only

Derek Buttles (born September 27, 1989) is an American former professional football player. He was signed by the Buffalo Bills in 2012. He played the position of tight end when he was signed onto the team's practice squad.

== Early life ==
Buttles was born on September 27, 1989, in Pike, New York. His parents are Steven and Darla Buttles. He attended Letchworth Central High School in Wyoming County, New York. By the time he graduated from high school he has proven himself not only an excellent football player, but also excelled in track and basketball. Buttles was on his high school’s honor roll. While playing college football at the University of Maine, Buttles earned Second-team All-Colonial Athletic Association honors in 2010, while he was still a junior, due to his outstanding performance, catching 27 passes to accumulate 291 yards with one touchdown.

Buttles graduated from the University of Maine in 2012 with a degree in construction management.

== Career ==
In 2012 Buttles participated in the rookie minicamp on a tryout basis, joining the practice squad as a tight end after the release of JB Shugarts from the squad. Buttles was called up to join the practice squad after tight end Scott Chandler tore his ACL during the penultimate game of the season.
