= Giants–Packers rivalry =

National Football League rivalry

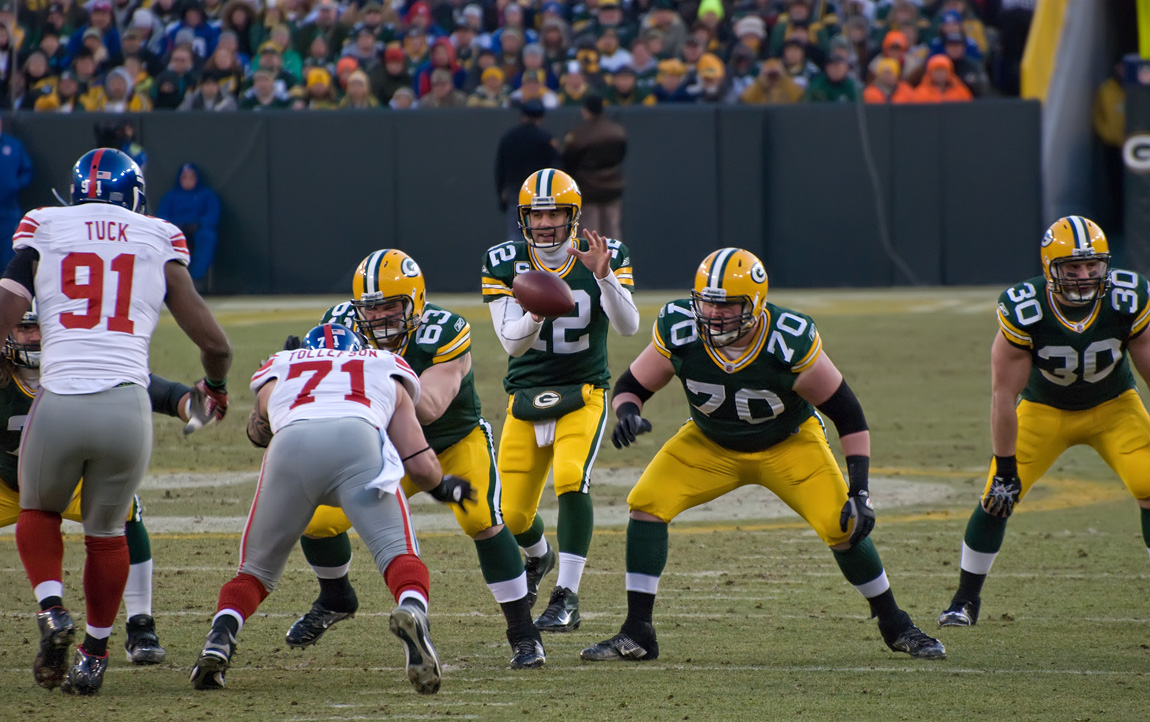
- The Giants and Packers playing in a 2012 playoff game

- New York Giants Green Bay Packers
- Location: New York City, Green Bay, Milwaukee
- First meeting: October 7, 1928; Giants 6, Packers 0
- Latest meeting: November 16, 2025; Packers 27, Giants 20
- Next meeting: TBD (no later than the 2028 regular season)
- Stadiums: Giants: MetLife Stadium; Packers: Lambeau Field

Statistics
- Total meetings: 65
- All-time series: Packers: 35–28–2
- Regular season series: Packers: 30–25–2
- Postseason results: Packers: 5–3
- Largest victory: Packers: 37–0 (1961); Giants: 49–3 (1948)
- Most points scored: Packers: 48 (1967); Giants: 55 (1986)
- Longest win streak: Packers: 5 (1961–1969); Giants: 3 (1932–1933, 1937–1938, 1986–1992, 2011–2013)
- Current win streak: Packers: 1 (2025–present)

Post-season history
- 1938 NFL Championship Game: Giants won: 23–17; 1939 NFL Championship Game: Packers won: 27–0; 1944 NFL Championship Game: Packers won: 14–7; 1961 NFL Championship Game: Packers won: 37–0; 1962 NFL Championship Game: Packers won: 16–7; 2007 NFC Championship: Giants won: 23–20 (OT); 2011 NFC Divisional: Giants won: 37–20; 2016 NFC Wild Card: Packers won: 38–13

The Giants–Packers rivalry is a National Football League (NFL) rivalry between the New York Giants and the Green Bay Packers. The two teams have played since 1970 in the National Football Conference, and they play each other in the regular season either every three years and once every six seasons at each team's home stadium or depending on its NFC division placement, and in the postseason.

== Notable games and moments ==
The Green Bay Packers and New York Giants have played 64 games including 26 games that have been decided by 8 points or less: Below are eight notable games from the rivalry.

- In the 1938 NFL Championship Game, the Giants and Packers met in their first playoff game. It was a battle between an 8–3 Packers team and an 8–2–1 Giants team. The Giants took an early 9–0 lead, but the Packers got a pair of touchdowns in the second quarter to make it 16–14 at the half. The Giants played well on defense in the second half, holding the Packers to 3 points. They won their third championship in their history, 23–17, and their first playoff game against Green Bay.
- In the 1944 NFL Championship Game, the Giants and Packers met in their third playoff game. It was a battle between two teams that got 8 wins in the regular season, with the Giants being 8–1–1 and the Packers being 8–2. The Packers scored two touchdowns in the second quarter and never looked back. They held a shutout through 3 quarters, and won the game 14–7. The Packers overall playoff record against the Giants is now 2–1.
- In the 1962 NFL Championship Game, the Giants and Packers played their last playoff game until 2007. The Packers were 13–1 while the Giants were 12–2. The Giants didn't score until the third quarter, but still were within 6 heading into the final quarter. However, the Packers got a game-sealing field goal in the 4th quarter to secure a 16–7 win. The Packers improved to 4–1 against the Giants in the playoffs.
- In 1971, the Giants and Packers met for the first time in the 1970s. The Packers got a 100 yard field goal return in the first quarter to take a 7–0 lead. The Giants then went on a 28–0 run, that included two Fran Tarkenton touchdown passes, a defensive touchdown, and a special teams touchdown. The Packers got a touchdown at the end of the half to make it 28–14. It was a blowout heading into the fourth quarter as the Giants led 42–24. The Packers got a couple touchdowns and a safety to make it 42–40, but came up just short in the highest scoring game of the rivalry. For the Giants, Fran Tarkenton threw for 4 touchdown passes and had a 120.2 rating.
- In the 2007 NFC Championship Game, The Packers and Giants met in their first playoff battle since 1962. The game was -1°F at kickoff, one of the coldest in NFL playoff history. The Packers were favored to win as they finished 13–3 to the Giants 10–6. Two Lawrence Tynes' field goals gave the Giants a 6–0 lead with 11:41 in the 2nd quarter. The Packers got a quick response with a Donald Driver 90 yard touchdown catch and led 10–6 at halftime. The teams got off to hot offensive starts to the second half, as the Giants won the 3rd Quarter with 14 points to the Packers’ 7, now ahead 20-17. Brandon Jacobs, Donald Lee and Ahmad Bradshaw were the players who scored touchdowns in the 3rd quarter. With 11:46 left in the 4th quarter, the Packers tied the game on a Mason Crosby 37 yard field goal. The game remained tied at 20 for the rest of regulation, so it went into overtime. The Packers won the toss, but Brett Favre threw an interception to Corey Webster, who got 9 yards on the return into Packers territory. This was Brett Favre's last pass as a Packer. Even though the Giants went three and out, they were in field goal range. Lawrence Tynes, who missed two field goals earlier, was the man who got the 47 yard field goal to win the game. This NFC Championship game sent the Giants to the Super Bowl where they pulled off a huge upset and beat the 16–0 Patriots by the score of 17–14.
- In 2011, the Packers and Giants battled it out in December as they played in an important regular season game. The Giants were 6–5 heading into the game, while the Packers were still undefeated at 11–0. Eli Manning and Aaron Rodgers both threw a touchdown pass in the first quarter, as the Giants led 10–7 at the end of this quarter. On the first play of the second quarter, Clay Matthews III returned an interception 38 yards for a touchdown. The Packers and Giants then traded touchdowns at the end of the half to make it 21–17 Green Bay. In the third quarter, Greg Jennings and Hakeem Nicks caught touchdowns to make it 28–24 at the end of the quarter. In the fourth quarter, the Giants trailed 35–27 inside the two minute warning, but Eli Manning led a drive that was capped off by a Hakeem Nicks touchdown catch. The Giants got the two point conversion to tie the game at 35 with 58 seconds left. However, on the final drive of the game, Aaron Rodgers completed a 24 yard pass to Jermichael Finley and a 27 yard pass to Jordy Nelson to get Green Bay well into field goal range. Mason Crosby finished it off with a game winning field goal with no time left to win it 38–35 for Green Bay.
- In the 2011 NFC Divisional round, the Giants looked for revenge from their Week 13 loss to Green Bay. The Giants were heavy underdogs, finishing the regular season at just 9–7 to the Packers’ 15–1. The game was a fast start for the Giants, as after the teams traded field goals Eli Manning found Hakeem Nicks for a 66 yard touchdown to give the Giants a 10–3 lead at the end of the first quarter. John Kuhn then caught an 8 yard touchdown early in the second quarter to tie the game at 10. It was 13–10 Giants with one play left in the first half. Eli Manning completed a 37 yard Hail Mary touchdown pass to Hakeem Nicks to give the Giants a 20–10 lead just before the half. The Packers fell behind 30–13 but did get a touchdown from Aaron Rodgers to Donald Driver with 4:46 left in the fourth quarter. However, the hope for Green Bay was short lived, as the Giants only took 2 minutes and 10 seconds to make it a three score game. The game ended with the Giants winning 37–20, as they moved on to the NFC Championship Game. The Giants eventually won Super Bowl XLVI against the New England Patriots 21–17.

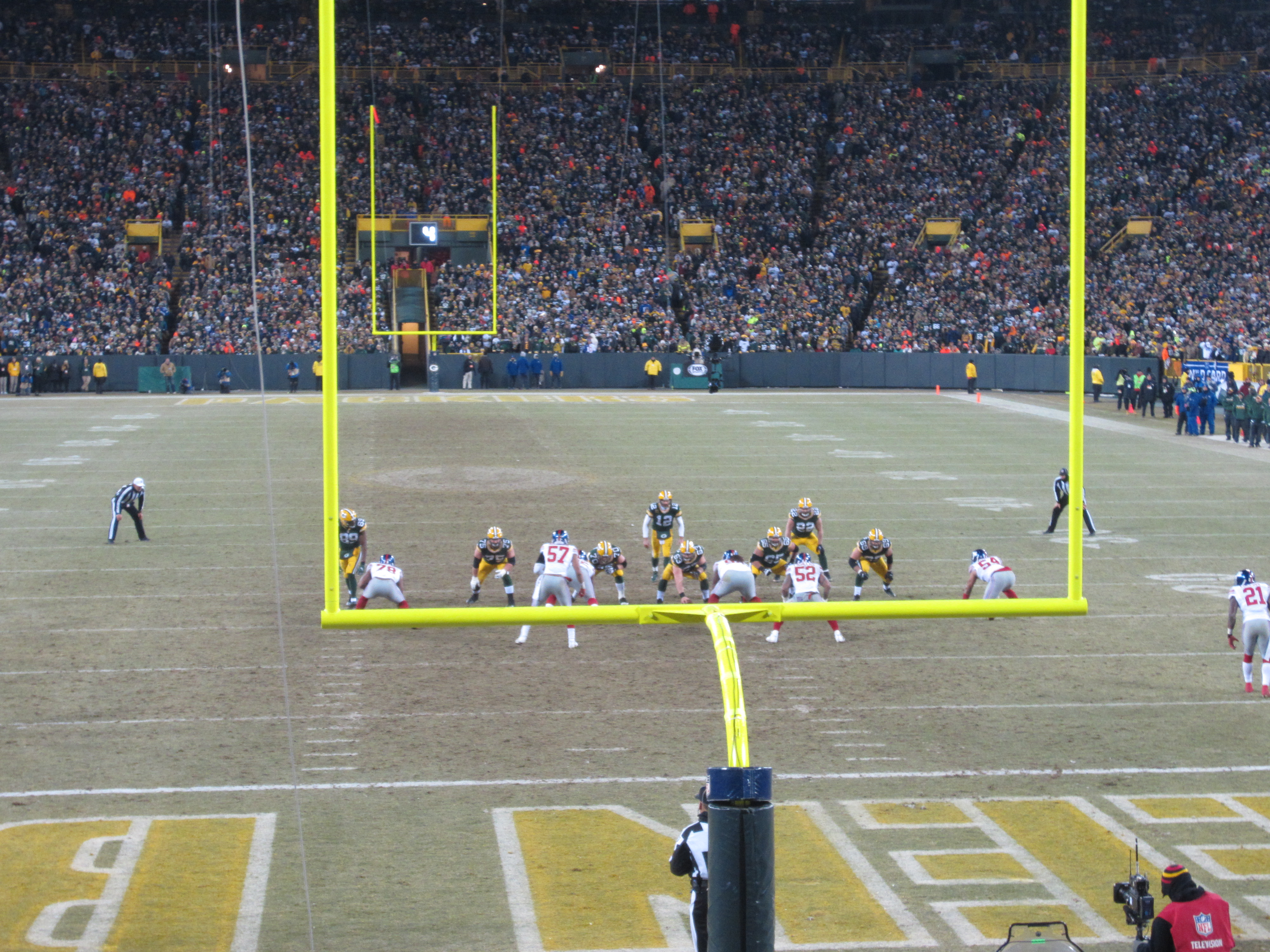
The Packers offense lining up against the Giants defense during their Wild Card playoff game.

- In the 2016 Wild Card round, the Packers and Giants played their most recent playoff game. The Packers finished 2016 with a 10–6 record while the Giants finished the season at 11–5. However the game was on the Packers’ home turf as they won their division, while the Giants finished behind the Dallas Cowboys in their division. It was a slow start for Green Bay as they fell behind 6–0. The Packers got their first points with 2:20 left in the second quarter, as Aaron Rodgers completed a 5 yard touchdown pass to Davante Adams. This started giving Green Bay offensive momentum. Similarly to the 2011 Divisional round between these teams, there was one play left in the first half, and it was a Hail Mary. Aaron Rodgers, who completed two Hail Maries in 2015, completed another one from 42 yards away to Randall Cobb to give Green Bay a 14–6 lead before halftime. The Packers offense continued their dominance, scoring 24 points in the second half. The Giants defense, which was the second best in points allowed, never gave up 30 points in the regular season, but allowed 38 in this game. Aaron Rodgers finished with 362 yards and 4 touchdowns in the win. The Packers went on to beat the Cowboys 34–31 in the Divisional Round, before losing to the Atlanta Falcons 44–21 in the NFC Championship Game.
- In the Packers' first international game in franchise history, the 3-1 Giants faced the Packers, also 3-1, as 8 point underdogs. The Packers expectedly started strong by claiming a 0-10 lead with a Mason Crosby 46 yard field goal and an Aaron Rodgers 4 yard touchdown throw to Allen Lazard. The Giants answered with a Graham Gano 48 yard field goal to close the first quarter, resulting in a 3-10 score. The Packers would immediately respond on their subsequent drive with a Rodgers 2 yard touchdown to Marcedes Lewis, increasing the Packers' lead to 3-14.This would be the last touchdown the Packers would score in the contest. Giants quarterback Daniel Jones then lead an 86 yard drive culminating in a 2 yard rushing touchdown by Daniel Bellinger. With 1:15 left in the half, Rodgers would lead the Packers to a 48 yard field goal to close the half at 10-20. The Giants started the second half by scoring a 37 yard field goal, making the score 13-20. More importantly, their defense shut out the Packers for the rest of the game, while the Giants offense slowly chipped away at their deficit. After forcing a punt, the Giants then conducted a long 92 yard drive ending with a Gary Brightwell 2 yard touchdown. New York then forced a three and out and had a 60 yard drive ending with a Saquon Barkley rushing touchdown. Green Bay, finding themselves behind for the first time in the contest, attempted to lead a game-tying touchdown drive down 27-20 with 6:08 left in the fourth quarter. Rodgers lead Green Bay to the Giants' six yard line, but New York's defense forced an incompletion on 4th and 2 with 1:02 left in the contest. The Giants would then intentionally allow a safety to run out the clock, giving Rodgers the ball back with 0:11 left in the game. However, on his Hail Mary attempt, Rodgers was sacked by Oshane Ximines, and New York completed their upset over Green Bay with a final score of 27–22.

== Season-by-season results ==
Green Bay Packers vs. New York Giants Season-by-Season Results
1920s (Packers, 2–1)

Season	Results	Location	Overall series	Notes
1928	Giants; 6–0	City Stadium	Giants; 1–0	The first meeting was the first between the two teams, and the first meeting was played at City Stadium.
1928	Packers; 7–0	Polo Grounds	Tied; 1–1	First meeting at Polo Grounds.
1929	Packers; 20–6	Polo Grounds	Packers; 2–1	Packers' win is the Giants' only loss in the 1929 season. That loss proved crucial, as the Giants finished 13–1–1, while the Packers finished with the league’s best record at 12–0–1 and won the 1929 NFL Championship.

1930s (Tied, 8–8)

Season	Results	Location	Overall series	Notes
1930	Packers; 14–7	City Stadium	Packers; 3–1	
1930	Giants; 13–6	Polo Grounds	Packers; 3–2	Packers win 1930 NFL Championship.
1931	Packers; 27–7	City Stadium	Packers; 4–2	
1931	Packers; 14–10	Polo Grounds	Packers; 5–2	Packers win 1931 NFL Championship.
1932	Packers; 13–0	City Stadium	Packers; 6–2	
1932	Giants; 6–0	Polo Grounds	Packers; 6–3	Giants' win handed the Packers their first loss of the season after an 8–0–1 start.
1933	Giants; 10–7	Borchert Field	Packers; 6–4	First Game in Borchert Field.
1933	Giants; 17–6	Polo Grounds	Packers; 6–5	Giants lose 1933 NFL Championship.
1934	Packers; 20–6	Wisconsin State Fair Park	Packers; 7–5	First Game in Wisconsin State Fair Park.
1934	Giants; 17–3	Polo Grounds	Packers; 7–6	Giants win 1934 NFL Championship.
1935	Packers; 16–7	City Stadium	Packers; 8–6	Giants lose 1935 NFL Championship.
1936	Packers; 26–14	Polo Grounds	Packers; 9–6	Packers win 1936 NFL Championship.
1937	Giants; 10–0	Polo Grounds	Packers; 9–7	
1938	Giants; 15–3	Polo Grounds	Packers; 9–8	
1938 playoffs	Giants 23–17	Polo Grounds	Tied 9–9	First NFL Championship Game between the two teams, and also the Giants' only win in what turned out to be five championship game meetings.
1939 playoffs	Packers 27–0	Wisconsin State Fair Park	Packers 10–9	Second NFL Championship Game between the two teams. It was the first of four straight Packers championship wins against the Giants.

1940s (Giants, 4–3–2)

Season	Results	Location	Overall series	Notes
1940	Giants; 7–3	Polo Grounds	Tied; 10–10	
1942	Tie; 21–21	Polo Grounds	Tied; 10–10–1	
1943	Packers; 35–21	Polo Grounds	Packers; 11–10–1	
1944	Giants; 24–0	Polo Grounds	Tied; 11–11–1	
1944 playoffs	Packers 14–7	Polo Grounds	Packers 12–11–1	Third NFL Championship Game between the two teams.
1945	Packers; 23–14	Polo Grounds	Packers; 13–11–1	
1947	Tie; 24–24	Polo Grounds	Packers; 13–11–2	
1948	Giants; 49–3	Wisconsin State Fair Park	Packers; 13–12–2	The Giants' largest win of the rivalry, and the last meeting at Wisconsin State Fair Park.
1949	Giants; 30–10	City Stadium	Tied; 13–13–2	

1950s (Giants, 2–1)

Season	Results	Location	Overall series	Notes
1952	Packers; 17–3	Polo Grounds	Packers; 14–13–2	
1957	Giants; 31–17	City Stadium	Tied; 14–14–2	
1959	Giants; 20–3	Yankee Stadium	Giants; 15–14–2	The first meeting at Yankee Stadium. Giants lose 1959 NFL Championship.

1960s (Packers, 5–0)

Season	Results	Location	Overall series	Notes
1961	Packers; 20–17	Milwaukee County Stadium	Tied; 15–15–2	First meeting at Milwaukee County Stadium.
1961 playoffs	Packers 37–0	City Stadium	Packers 16–15–2	Fourth NFL Championship Game between the two teams. Largest Packers win over the Giants to date.
1962 playoffs	Packers 16–7	Yankee Stadium	Packers 17–15–2	Fifth and final NFL Championship Game between the two teams, resulting in the Packers being 4–1 in NFL Championship Games against the Giants. This would be the last time the Packers and Giants met in the playoffs until the 2007 NFC Championship Game.
1967	Packers; 48–21	Yankee Stadium	Packers; 18–15–2	Packers win 1967 NFL Championship & Super Bowl II.
1969	Packers; 20–10	Milwaukee County Stadium	Packers; 19–15–2	

1970s (Packers, 2–1)

Season	Results	Location	Overall series	Notes
1971	Giants; 42–40	Lambeau Field	Packers; 19–16–2	First meeting at Lambeau Field. The highest-scoring game in the rivalry.
1973	Packers; 16–14	Yale Bowl	Packers; 20–16–2	First Game in Yale Bowl.
1975	Packers; 40–14	Milwaukee County Stadium	Packers; 21–16–2	

1980s (Tied, 4–4)

Season	Results	Location	Overall series	Notes
1980	Giants; 27–21	Giants Stadium	Packers; 21–17–2	First meeting at Giants Stadium.
1981	Packers; 27–14	Giants Stadium	Packers; 22–17–2	
1981	Packers; 26–24	Milwaukee County Stadium	Packers; 23–17–2	Last meeting at Milwaukee County Stadium.
1982	Packers; 27–19	Giants Stadium	Packers; 24–17–2	
1983	Giants; 27–3	Giants Stadium	Packers; 24–18–2	
1985	Packers; 23–20	Lambeau Field	Packers; 25–18–2	
1986	Giants; 55–24	Giants Stadium	Packers; 25–19–2	Most points by the Giants in the rivalry. The Giants went on to win Super Bowl XXI, their first Super Bowl win.
1987	Giants; 20–10	Giants Stadium	Packers; 25–20–2	

1990s (Packers, 2–1)

Season	Results	Location	Overall series	Notes
1992	Giants; 27–7	Giants Stadium	Packers; 25–21–2	Brett Favre's first game against the Giants.
1995	Packers; 14–6	Lambeau Field	Packers; 26–21–2	
1998	Packers; 37–3	Giants Stadium	Packers; 27–21–2	The 34-point Packers win is the largest Packers regular-season win over the Giants.

2000s (Tied, 2–2)

Season	Results	Location	Overall series	Notes
2001	Packers; 34–25	Giants Stadium	Packers; 28–21–2	The game was originally scheduled for Week 2 but was rescheduled to Week 17 following the September 11 attacks. Michael Strahan sets NFL record for individual sacks at 22.5.
2004	Giants; 14–7	Lambeau Field	Packers; 28–22–2	
2007	Packers; 35–13	Giants Stadium	Packers; 29–22–2	Eli Manning's first game against the Packers. Giants win Super Bowl XLII.
2007 playoffs	Giants 23–20(OT)	Lambeau Field	Packers 29–23–2	2007 NFC Championship Game. First playoff battle between the two teams since the 1962 NFL Championship. The game was -1° at kickoff, and went into overtime. On his last pass as a Packer, Brett Favre threw an interception to Corey Webster, allowing Lawrence Tynes to rebound from 2 earlier missed field goals by hitting a 47-yarder to send the Giants to Super Bowl XLII.

2010s (Packers, 5–3)

Season	Results	Location	Overall series	Notes
2010	Packers; 45–17	Lambeau Field	Packers; 30–23–2	Packers QB Aaron Rodgers' first game against the Giants, and his first 400-yard regular season game. The Packers' win allowed the eventual Super Bowl XLV champions to earn a tiebreaker over the Giants for the NFC's sixth seed.
2011	Packers; 38–35	MetLife Stadium	Packers; 31–23–2	First meeting at MetLife Stadium. With the game tied at 35 in the fourth quarter, Aaron Rodgers found Jermichael Finley and Jordy Nelson for big first down completions, setting up a game-winning field goal by Mason Crosby.
2011 playoffs	Giants 37–20	Lambeau Field	Packers 31–24–2	NFC Divisional Round. Giants avenge their Week 13 loss to the Packers en route to their Super Bowl XLVI win. The game's most notable play came when Eli Manning found Hakeem Nicks on a Hail Mary just before halftime to make it a 20–10 game, and the Giants would end up winning 37–20.
2012	Giants; 38–10	MetLife Stadium	Packers; 31–25–2	
2013	Giants; 27–13	MetLife Stadium	Packers; 31–26–2	Originally scheduled for Sunday Night Football, but it got flexed out when Aaron Rodgers sustained a broken collarbone two weeks earlier and would miss the game as a result. Backup Scott Tolzien would throw three interceptions in the 27-13 Giants victory.
2016	Packers; 23–16	Lambeau Field	Packers; 32–26–2	
2016 playoffs	Packers 38–13	Lambeau Field	Packers 33–26–2	NFC Wild Card Round. The Packers avenge their previous home playoff losses to Eli Manning. The most memorable play of this game came right before halftime, as Aaron Rodgers found Randall Cobb for a 42-yard Hail Mary touchdown at the end of the first half, similar to the Hakeem Nicks Hail Mary against the Packers in the 2011 playoffs.
2019	Packers; 31–13	MetLife Stadium	Packers; 34–26–2	Eli Manning's final NFL season.

2020s (Giants, 2–1)

Season	Results	Location	Overall series	Notes
2022	Giants; 27–22	Tottenham Hotspur Stadium	Packers; 34–27–2	Game played as part of the NFL International Series, officially a Packers home game. Last start in the series for Aaron Rodgers.
2023	Giants; 24–22	MetLife Stadium	Packers; 34–28–2	Game winning drive orchestrated by rookie Tommy DeVito. Packers quarterback Jordan Love's first game against the Giants.
2025	Packers; 27–20	MetLife Stadium	Packers; 35–28–2	

Summary of Results

Season	Season series	at Green Bay Packers	at New York Giants	Notes
Regular season	Packers 30–25–2	Packers 13–8	Tie 17–17–2	Packers 4–0 in games played at Milwaukee County Stadium, Giants 1–0 in London (officially a Packers home game)
Postseason	Packers 5–3	Packers 3–2	Packers 2–1	NFL Championship Game: 1938, 1939, 1944, 1961, 1962; NFC Wild Card: 2016; NFC Divisional: 2011; NFC Championship: 2007
Regular and postseason	Packers 35–28–2	Packers 16–10	Packers 19–18–2	

== See also ==
- National Football League rivalries
