= 1959 Green Bay Packers season =

NFL team season

- General manager: Vince Lombardi
- Head coach: Vince Lombardi
- Home stadium: City Stadium; Milwaukee County Stadium

Results
- Record: 7–5
- Division place: 3rd (tied) NFL Western
- Playoffs: Did not qualify

The 1959 Green Bay Packers season was their 39th season in the National Football League and 41st overall. The team finished with a 7–5 record in the 1959 season under first-year coach Vince Lombardi to earn a third-place finish in the Western Conference.

It was the Packers' first winning season in a dozen years, the last being a 6–5–1 mark in 1947. Green Bay had just one victory during the previous season in 1958 with the worst record in the twelve-team league, and were 3–9 in 1957, tied for worst. Hired in early February, Lombardi was previously the offensive coach (coordinator) for the New York Giants under head coach Jim Lee Howell.

== Offseason ==
=== NFL draft ===
Round	Pick	Player	Position	School/Club team
1	1	Randy Duncan	Quarterback	Iowa
2	13	Alex Hawkins	Back	South Carolina
3	25	Boyd Dowler	Wide receiver	Colorado
5	55	Andy Cvercko	Guard	Northwestern
6	61	Willie Taylor	Center	Florida A&M
7	73	Bobby Jackson	Back	Alabama
7	83	Gary Raid	Tackle	Willamette
8	85	Buddy Mayfield	End	South Carolina
8	95	Bob Laraba	Back	Texas Western
9	97	George Dixon	Back	Bridgeport
10	109	Sam Tuccio	Tackle	Southern Miss
11	121	Bob Webb	Back	St. Ambrose
12	133	Larry Hall	Guard	Missouri Valley
13	145	Jim Hurd	Back	Albion
14	157	Ken Kerr	Guard	Arizona State
15	169	Dick Teteak	Guard	Wisconsin
16	181	Dan Edgington	End	Florida
17	193	Tom Secules	Back	William & Mary
18	205	Dick Nearents	Tackle	Eastern Washington
19	217	Bill Butler	Safety	Chattanooga
20	229	Charley Sample	Back	Arkansas
21	241	Dave Smith	Back	Ripon (WI)
22	253	Charlie Anderson	End	Drake
23	265	Ben Lawver	Tackle	Lewis & Clark
24	277	Joe Hergert	Center	Florida
25	289	Leroy Hardee	Back	Florida A&M
26	301	Ken Higginbotham	End	Trinity (TX)
27	313	Timothy Brown	Running back	Ball State
28	325	Jerry Epps	Guard	West Texas State
29	337	Jack Flara	Back	Pittsburgh
30	349	Dick Emerich	Tackle	West Chester

- Yellow indicates a future Pro Bowl selection

== The Lombardi Era begins ==
On February 4, 1959, Vince Lombardi seized his opportunity and began building his football dynasty in Green Bay. He arrived after both phases of the draft (December 1 and January 21), and started by trading away the Packers' best receiver of the decade, Billy Howton, to the Cleveland Browns. To bring some much-needed leadership to the defensive backfield, Lombardi obtained future Hall of Famer Emlen Tunnell from the New York Giants. He also acquired Fuzzy Thurston from the Baltimore Colts and defensive tackle Henry Jordan from Cleveland by the start of training camp. In all, 16 veterans from the previous season were sent packing as Lombardi installed a new attitude in the Packers' locker room.

=== Training camp ===
Lombardi borrowed from the Giants model — the players had to feel like champions. The team traveled first class under the philosophy that "you can't be a winner unless you feel like one." The change in culture was pronounced. Lombardi had to find a quarterback, and he was resistant to making Bart Starr the quarterback. Starr was in his fourth year in the league and had not won a game in which he had played four quarters. "Did Bart tell you how bad he was?" a player was to later quip to biographer John Eisenberg. Former Razorback Lamar McHan beat out Starr, while veteran Babe Parilli was cut in mid-September, along with rookie running back Alex Hawkins, the thirteenth overall selection in the 1959 NFL draft.

=== Master plan ===
Through his coaching style, Lombardi changed the Packers into winners. He put his plan into effect at his first team meeting. "I have never been on a losing team, gentlemen, and I do not intend to start now!"

=== Dramatic improvement ===
The results of Lombardi's approach were dramatic. In the season opener against the Chicago Bears, the Packers held on to win 9–6 and celebrated the victory by carrying their new head coach off the field. In his first year on the sidelines, the Packers posted their first winning record since 1947. The team's quick turnaround netted Lombardi unanimous honors as NFL coach of the year.

== Schedule ==
=== Preseason ===
Week	Date	Opponent	Result	Venue	Attendance	Sources
1	August 15	Chicago Bears	**L** 16–19	Milwaukee County Stadium	28,286	
2	August 23	at San Francisco 49ers	**W** 24–17	Kezar Stadium	18,916	
3	August 29	vs. Philadelphia Eagles	**W** 45–28	Portland, OR	25,456	
4	September 5	vs. New York Giants	**L** 0–14	Bangor, ME	20,000	
5	September 12	vs. Washington Redskins	**W** 20–13	Winston-Salem, NC	15,000	
6	September 20	vs. Pittsburgh Steelers	**W** 13–10	Minneapolis, MN	18,081	

=== Regular season ===
Lombardi's first regular season game as Packers coach was on September 27, against the rival Chicago Bears; before 32,150 in Green Bay, they upset the Bears. In the final seven minutes, the previously scoreless Packers put up nine points to win 9–6. After Chicago fumbled a punt return, fullback Jim Taylor scored a touchdown, and Paul Hornung's extra point gave them a 7–6 lead. Max McGee's sixty-one-yard punt landed on the Bears' two-yard line and set up the final score of the game; Hawg Hanner scored a safety by tackling Chicago quarterback Ed Brown in the end zone. After the game, center Jim Ringo grabbed the game ball and gave it to Lombardi.

Game	Date	Opponent	Result	Record	Venue	Attendance	Recap	Sources
1	September 27	**Chicago Bears**	**W** 9–6	1–0	City Stadium	32,150	Recap	
2	October 4	**Detroit Lions**	**W** 28–10	2–0	City Stadium	32,150	Recap	
3	October 11	**San Francisco 49ers**	**W** 21–20	3–0	City Stadium	32,150	Recap	
4	October 18	**Los Angeles Rams**	**L** 6–45	3–1	Milwaukee County Stadium	36,194	Recap	
5	October 25	at **Baltimore Colts**	**L** 21–38	3–2	Memorial Stadium	57,557	Recap	
6	November 1	at New York Giants	**L** 3–20	3–3	Yankee Stadium	68,837	Recap	
7	November 8	at **Chicago Bears**	**L** 17–28	3–4	Wrigley Field	46,205	Recap	
8	November 15	**Baltimore Colts**	**L** 24–28	3–5	Milwaukee County Stadium	25,521	Recap	
9	November 22	Washington Redskins	**W** 21–0	4–5	City Stadium	31,853	Recap	
10	November 26	at **Detroit Lions**	**W** 24–17	5–5	Briggs Stadium	49,221	Recap	
11	December 6	at **Los Angeles Rams**	**W** 38–20	6–5	L.A. Memorial Coliseum	61,044	Recap	
12	December 13	at **San Francisco 49ers**	**W** 36–14	7–5	Kezar Stadium	55,997	Recap	
Note: Intra-conference opponents are in **bold** text.

== Game summaries ==
=== Regular season ===
==== Week 1: vs. Chicago Bears ====
Quarter	1	2	3	4	Total
Bears	0	3	0	3	6
Packers	0	0	0	9	9

at City Stadium, Green Bay, Wisconsin

- Date: September 27
- Pro-Football-Reference.com

Game information

Second Quarter

- CHI – John Aveni 46-yard field goal – Bears 3–0

Fourth Quarter

- CHI – John Aveni 42-yard field goal – Bears 6–0
- GB – Jim Taylor 5-yard run (Paul Hornung kick) – Packers 7–6
- GB – Safety, Brown tackled by Hanner in end zone – Packers 9–6

=== Standings ===
NFL Western Conference
	W	L	T	PCT	CONF	PF	PA	STK
Baltimore Colts	9	3	0	.750	9–1	374	251	W5
Chicago Bears	8	4	0	.667	6–4	252	196	W7
San Francisco 49ers	7	5	0	.583	5–5	255	237	L2
Green Bay Packers	7	5	0	.583	6–4	248	246	W4
Detroit Lions	3	8	1	.273	2–8	203	275	L1
Los Angeles Rams	2	10	0	.167	2–8	242	315	L8

Note: Tie games were not officially counted in the standings until 1972.

== Roster ==
1959 Green Bay Packers final roster
Quarterbacks: 20 Joe Francis; 17 Lamar McHan; 15 Bart Starr; Running backs: 22 Bill Butler; 33 Lew Carpenter; 5 Paul Hornung K; 42 Don McIlhenny; 31 Jim Taylor; Receivers: 86 Boyd Dowler; 84 Gary Knafelc; 88 Ron Kramer; 85 Max McGee P; 81 A. D. Williams	Offensive linemen: 68 John Dittrich G; 75 Forrest Gregg T; 64 Jerry Kramer G; 78 Norm Masters T; 51 Jim Ringo C; 76 Bob Skoronski T; 63 Fuzzy Thurston G; Defensive linemen: 73 Ken Beck DT; 87 Nate Borden DE; 79 Dave Hanner DT; 74 Henry Jordan DT; 83 Bill Quinlan DE; 82 Jim Temp DE	Linebackers: 65 Tom Bettis MLB; 58 Dan Currie OLB; 71 Bill Forester OLB; 66 Ray Nitschke OLB; Defensive backs: 44 Bobby Dillon S; 41 Bobby Freeman CB; 46 Hank Gremminger CB; 27 John Symank S; 45 Emlen Tunnell S; 47 Jesse Whittenton CB	Reserve list: -- Andy Cvercko G (IR); 80 Steve Meilinger WR (IR); Rookies in italics

== Awards, records, and honors ==
- Vince Lombardi, Coach of the Year
