= Bill Quinlan =

American football player (1932–2015)

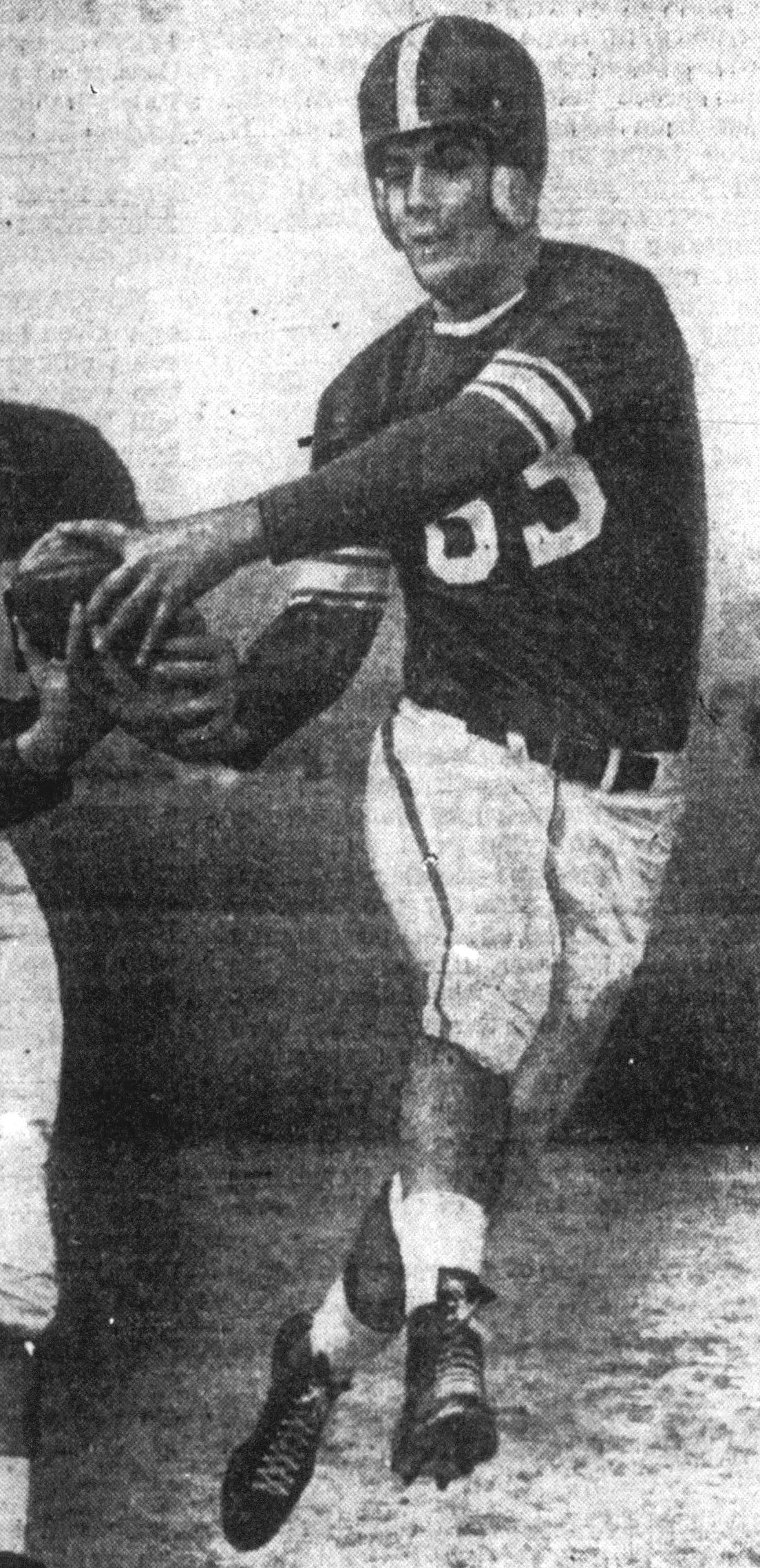
- Quinlan in 1953

No. 78, 84, 83, 85
- Position: Defensive end

Personal information
- Born: June 19, 1932; Lawrence, Massachusetts, U.S.
- Died: November 10, 2015 (aged 83); Methuen, Massachusetts, U.S.
- Listed height: 6 ft 3 in (1.91 m)
- Listed weight: 248 lb (112 kg)

Career information
- High school: Lawrence
- College: Michigan State (1952–1953)
- NFL draft: 1956: 3rd round, 37th overall pick

Career history
- Hamilton Tiger-Cats (1954); Cleveland Browns (1957–1958}); Green Bay Packers (1959–1962); Philadelphia Eagles (1963); Detroit Lions (1964); Washington Redskins (1965)

Awards and highlights
- 2× NFL champion (1961, 1962)

Career NFL statistics
- Interceptions: 3
- Fumble recoveries: 2
- Stats at Pro Football Reference

William David Quinlan (June 19, 1932 – November 10, 2015) was an American professional football defensive end who played in the National Football League (NFL) for the Cleveland Browns, Green Bay Packers, Philadelphia Eagles, Detroit Lions, and Washington Redskins. He also played in the Canadian Football League (CFL) for the Hamilton Tiger-Cats. Quinlan played college football at Michigan State University and was selected in the third round of the 1956 NFL draft.

== Early life ==
Quinlan was born in Lawrence, Massachusetts, and attended Lawrence High School, where he lettered in football, basketball, and baseball. After graduating high school in 1951, Quinlan attended Staunton Military Academy in 1952 and was inducted into their Hall of Fame.

== College career ==
Quinlan attended and played college football at Michigan State University.

== Professional career ==
After graduating from Michigan State, Quinlan played for the Hamilton Tiger-Cats of the Canadian Football League in 1954. He was then selected in the third round (37th overall) of the 1956 NFL draft by the Cleveland Browns. He joined the Browns in 1957 after serving in the United States Army in 1956. He was traded to the Green Bay Packers in 1959, along with Lew Carpenter, in return for Billy Howton. During his tenure with the Packers, he helped them win two National Football Championships in 1961 and 1962. In 1963, The Packers traded Quinlan and defensive back John Symank to the New York Giants for a high draft pick. The Giants immediately traded Quinlan to the Philadelphia Eagles in exchange for defensive end Gene Gossage.

== Personal life ==
Quinlan's father died when he was four years old, and his mother raised seven children. Quinlan died on November 10, 2015, in Methuen, Massachusetts. He lived in Lawrence, Massachusetts with his wife, Betty, was a lifelong member of St. Patrick’s Catholic Church in Lawrence and had previously survived cancer.
