= Lew Carpenter =

American football player and coach (1932–2010)

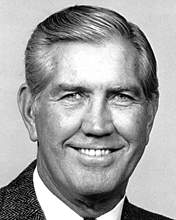
- Carpenter in 1986

No. 30, 32, 33, 34
- Positions: Halfback, fullback

Personal information
- Born: January 12, 1932; Hayti, Missouri, U.S.
- Died: November 14, 2010 (aged 78); New Braunfels, Texas, U.S.
- Listed height: 6 ft 1 in (1.85 m)
- Listed weight: 220 lb (100 kg)

Career information
- High school: West Memphis (AR)
- College: Arkansas (1949–1952)
- NFL draft: 1953: 8th round, 97th overall pick

Career history

Playing
- Detroit Lions (1953–1955); Cleveland Browns (1957–1958); Green Bay Packers (1959–1963)

Coaching
- Minnesota Vikings (1964–1966) Receivers coach; Atlanta Falcons (1967) Receivers coach; Atlanta Falcons (1968) Offensive coordinator; Washington Redskins (1969–1970) Receivers coach; St. Louis Cardinals (1971–1972) Offensive coordinator; Houston Oilers (1973–1974) Receivers coach; Green Bay Packers (1975–1985) Receivers coach; Detroit Lions (1987) Receivers coach; Detroit Lions (1988) Offensive coordinator; Philadelphia Eagles (1990–1994) Receivers/tight ends coach; Frankfurt Galaxy (1996) Assistant coach

Awards and highlights
- 3× NFL champion (1953, 1961, 1962)

Career NFL statistics
- Rushing yards: 2,025
- Rushing average: 4.3
- Receptions: 87
- Receiving yards: 782
- Total touchdowns: 21
- Stats at Pro Football Reference
- Coaching profile at Pro Football Reference

Lewis Glen Carpenter (January 12, 1932 – November 14, 2010) was an American professional football player and coach. He played college football for the University of Arkansas and professionally for ten seasons in the National Football League (NFL) as a halfback and fullback with the Detroit Lions, Cleveland Browns, and Green Bay Packers. He played on three NFL Championship teams, with Detroit in 1953 and with Green Bay in 1961 and 1962. After his playing career ended, Carpenter spent 31 years as an assistant coach in the NFL with the Minnesota Vikings (1964–1966), Atlanta Falcons (1967–1968), Washington Redskins (1969), St. Louis Cardinals (1970–1972), Houston Oilers (1970–1974), Green Bay Packers (1975–1985), Detroit Lions (1987–1988), and Philadelphia Eagles (1990–1994). Carpenter also coached the Frankfurt Galaxy of the World League of American Football in 1996 and at Southwest Texas State University. He concluded his 47 years of playing and coaching football at the end of the 1996 season. Scientific tests on his brain diagnosed post-mortem that he had an advanced case of chronic traumatic encephalopathy (CTE).

== Early years and family ==
Carpenter was born to Verba Glen Carpenter and Edna Earl Pullam in Hayti, Missouri. He was raised in West Memphis, Arkansas, where he attended high school and played six-man football. In 1951, Lew married Ann Holt. The couple had four daughters; Cheryl, Cathy, Lisa and Rebecca. His brother, Preston Carpenter (1934 – 2011), married Jeanne Eytchison and the couple had three sons: Scott, Bruce, and Lewis Todd.

== College career ==
While at the University of Arkansas (1949–1953), Carpenter starred at the halfback position for the Razorbacks. As a senior, he played in the Blue-Grey College All-Star Game. Carpenter also played wide receiver, tight end, and served as back-up quarterback during his college years. Carpenter received varsity letters in football, basketball, and baseball. He graduated with a Bachelor of Science degree in biology. Carpenter played for three different head coaches during his time at Arkansas. John Barnhill recruited him out of high school, but he retired from coach after the 1949 season. Otis Douglas took over in 1950, but he was an ineffective coach and was fired at the end of the 1952 season. In 1953, Bowden Wyatt became the head coach during Carpenter's senior season. Carpenter never won any championships in college, but his brother Preston helped the 1954 team win the Southwest Conference.

Carpenter played baseball after his 1953 senior year in college in the minor (then class B) Carolina League, as a pitcher, with the Winston-Salem Cardinals. During this season he had a batting average of .286 under manager Jimmy Brown. Scouts for the NFL also offered him a contract and football beat baseball in this circumstance.

== NFL playing career ==
Carpenter's primary positions played: defensive half back, fullback, halfback, and offensive half back/running back. Carpenter was listed at a height of 6 foot 2 inches and had a playing weight from 205 to 220 pounds and was considered fast afoot.

=== Detroit Lions ===
In 1953, Carpenter was drafted by the National Football League for the Detroit Lions in the eighth round of the draft, 97th selection. The first time in game play he got the football, he scored a 73-yard touchdown on an interception.

For the next three seasons, Carpenter was a running back. He was the Lions' leading rusher and won his first world championship in 1953.

In 1954, Carpenter led Detroit with 476 rushing yards and in 1955, 543 yards. He helped the Detroit Lions get back into the 1954 NFL Championship game, by winning the NFL Western Conference, before bowing to the 1954 NFL Champion Cleveland Browns. Over his three seasons with the Lions, he rushed for 1,043 yards, with 60 pass receptions (457 yards gained and 4 touchdowns), and scored 10 touchdowns.

Carpenter's football career was placed on hold for the 1956 season, when he was drafted by the United States Army. He served honorably during an 18-month tour in Germany.

=== Cleveland Browns ===
In 1957, after returning from Germany, Carpenter was traded to the Cleveland Browns, where he played with Preston Carpenter, his brother.

In 1957 NFL draft, the Browns had selected fullback Jim Brown out of Syracuse University, who became the NFL's leading rusher with 942 yards in a 12-game regular season. The emergence of Brown limited Carpenter to 83 attempts rushing, resulting in 315 yards and 4 touchdowns.

Once again at the top of the division with 9 wins, 2 losses and 1 tied game, Cleveland advanced to the Championship Game against Detroit. But the Lions dominated from start to finish, causing six turnovers and limiting the Browns' quarterbacks (Tommy O'Connell and Milt Plum) to 95 yards passing in a 59–14 rout.

=== Green Bay Packers ===
In 1959, Coach Vince Lombardi got a key trade by getting Lew Carpenter to come to Green Bay, Wisconsin, and to play for the Packers. While with the Packers he helped them win two world championships. Carpenter's first game under Lombardi came quickly. On September 27, 1959, a sellout crowd packed Green Bay's New City Stadium for the first Packer game of the regular season against the Chicago Bears. On the Packers first offensive play, a new Lombardi technique was seen. "Packer halfback Paul Hornung took a handoff from the quarterback, ran to his left and threw the ball downfield to a wide open receiver near the goal line." The crowd jumped to its feet, cheering at this new tactic! Then, the receiver, "Lew Carpenter dropped the ball."

At halftime in the locker room, Coach Lombardi concluded his pep talk with, "And now, men of Green Bay, step aside. Make way for the mightiest Green Bay team in years! A Winning team! Go get 'em, Green Bay!" In response, Carpenter and the rest of the Packers slammed their lockers, growled loudly, and assaulted the field in determination. During the rest of the game, the Bears watched Carpenter closely, seeing him as a threat. The Packers adjusted tactics and used Carpenter repeatedly as bait while another player got the critical touchdown. At the end of the game, the Green Bay Packers beat the Chicago Bears by a score of 9 to 6. The Packer players raised Lombardi to their shoulders and ran with him in victory. "We're on our way Now!" shouted Lombardi.

After winning their first three games, the Packers lost the next five due to injuries, including Carpenter's. Returning, Carpenter and his team finished strong by winning the rest of the season. The 7 win & 5 loss record represented the Packers' first winning season since 1947. Rookie head coach Lombardi was named Coach of the Year. For the Pack this was the start of the Glory Years.

The next year, the Packers, led by Paul Hornung's 176 points, and assisted by running back Carpenter, won the NFL West title and played in the NFL Championship against the Philadelphia Eagles at Philadelphia. In a see-saw game, the Packers trailed the Eagles by four points late in the game, when Chuck Bednarik tackled Jim Taylor nine yards short of the goal line as time ran out. The Packers claimed that they did not "lose" that game; they were simply behind in the score when time ran out on them.

The Packers returned to the NFL Championship game the following season and faced the New York Giants in the first league title game to be played in Green Bay. The Packers scored 24 second-quarter points assisted by Carpenter, including a championship-record 19 by Paul Hornung, on special loan from the Army (one touchdown, four extra-points and three field goals), powering the Packers to a 37 to 0 major win over the Giants, their first NFL Championship since 1944.

The Packers stormed back in the 1962 season, jumping out to a 10-win and 0-loss start, on their way to a 13–1 season. This consistent level of success would lead to Lombardi's Packers becoming one of the most prominent teams of their era, and even to their being featured as the face of the NFL on the cover of Time on December 21, 1962, as part of the magazine's cover story on "The Sport of the '60s" and Lew Carpenter is mentioned in the article as one of the Packers' star players. Shortly after Time's article, the Packers faced the Giants in a much more brutal championship game than the previous year, but the Packers prevailed on the surprising foot of Jerry Kramer and the determined running of Jim Taylor. The Packers defeated the Giants in New York, 16–7. Carpenter re-injured himself but finished the game. During this season Carpenter assisted other players in their game, gaining the informal title of "coach".

In 1963, Paul Hornung was suspended for the season for betting on football. This caused Carpenter and others to make more than extra efforts for the team. While the Packers had an 11–1 season, it was at great cost. Many players injured themselves and re-injured themselves like Carpenter. Coach Lombardi placed Carpenter as a reserve running back, but had to play him time after time for the winning effort. After four full seasons of play with the Packers, Carpenter concluded his professional football playing days at the end of the 1963 season.

Carpenter played 123 professional football games. He finished his ten-year career with 2,025 yards and 16 touchdowns on 468 carries. He also caught 87 passes for 782 yards.

== Coaching career ==
In 1964 Carpenter became one of the assistant coaches of the Minnesota Vikings. He served in various coaching positions and teams over the next 30 years. These included receivers coach, passing game coach and offensive coordinator for the Atlanta Falcons and the Washington Redskins.

Carpenter coached alongside Vince Lombardi then coached for St. Louis Cardinals, the Houston Oilers, the Green Bay Packers, the Detroit Lions and the Philadelphia Eagles. Along the way, he mentored many upcoming Pro Bowl players.

=== Minnesota Vikings ===
Carpenter coached several Vikings who were later inducted into the Pro Football Hall of Fame, Fran Tarkenton and Carl Eller.

=== Atlanta Falcons ===
In late 1966, Carpenter became one of the first coaches on the new NFL Atlanta Falcons franchise, the 23rd professional football club and the 15th NFL franchise. In 1967, the Falcons played in the new Atlanta–Fulton County Stadium. The first preseason game was held on August 1, 1966, before a crowd of 26,072 at Atlanta Stadium. Under Head Coach Norb Hecker, the Falcons became the only expansion team in history not to finish in last place their first year. The Falcons finished seventh out of eight teams in the NFL's Eastern Conference. Carpenter helped coach the Falcons first victory on November 20, 1966, defeating the New York Giants, 27 to 16, at Yankee Stadium. Tommy Nobis, first draft pick and coached by Carpenter was voted to the Pro Bowl and named 1966 Rookie of the Year.

Carpenter participated in many pivotal events for the newly created American football team called the Atlanta Falcons.

1967 was disappointing for the Falcons. They finished their season at 1–12–1. Tommy Nobis (LB) was named to his second Pro Bowl and Junior Coffey (RB) ended the year with 722 yards to finish as the eighth leading rusher in the league and the Falcons’ Most Valuable Player and Carpenter helped coach them both.

1968 - The former head coach of the Minnesota Vikings Norm Van Brocklin was named to replace Norb Hecker as Falcon's head coach after only three games of the 1968 season. Carpenter worked with Van Brocklin, who he knew as a player and a coach.

Carpenter helped coach two future Georgia Sports Hall of Fame winners. These were Tommy Nobis and Claude Humphry.

=== Washington Redskins ===
In 1969, the Washington Redskins hired Vince Lombardi, who gained fame with the Green Bay Packers, to be their new head coach.

Lombardi reorganized the Redskins and brought along a couple of coaches he worked with before, including Bill Austin for the offensive line and Lew Carpenter for the receivers. Carpenter was listed as the Packers passing game coordinator and offensive coordinator coach over various seasons.

Lombardi led the Redskins to a 7–5–2 record, their best since 1955, but died of cancer on the eve of the 1970 season. Carpenter was in the running to replace Lombardi as head coach, but Redskins assistant coach Bill Austin (the former Pittsburgh Steelers head coach) was chosen instead during 1970 and produced a record of 6–8. Carpenter decided to coach elsewhere.

Carpenter coached only one season with the Redskins as the receivers and tight ends coach. His coaching and efforts had an influence on the 1969 season and future game play. Those Redskins who became inducted into the Pro Football Hall of Fame include Sonny Jurgensen in 1983, Charley Taylor in 1984, Bobby Mitchell in 1983 and Sam Huff in 1982 were helped in one way or the other by Carpenter. Carpenter's General Manager during his assistant coaching tenure was George Preston Marshall who was also inducted into the Hall of Fame in 1969. One of the Redskin's assistant coaches who worked with Carpenter, Mike McCormack was inducted in 1984. Vince Lombardi, the unforgettable coach, was inducted in 1971.

=== St. Louis Cardinals ===
The football club St. Louis Cardinals moved to St. Louis, Missouri, in 1960 and stayed there until 1987. Then the franchise moved to Tempe, Arizona and became the Arizona Cardinals. When Carpenter got there in 1970 the club had many nicknames such as, the "football Cardinals," "Big Red", "Gridbirds" or "Cardiac Cards" to avoid confusion with the baseball St. Louis Cardinals.

"Coach Lew" went to St. Louis as a receivers and tight end coach for head coach Bob Holloway.

Two brothers, Charles W. Bidwell Jr. and William V. Bidwell (sons of the 1933-1947 Cardinal franchise owner Charles W. Bidwell Sr. and the 1947–1962 owner, the widow, Mrs. Violet Bidwell) had joint custody of the franchise from 1962 to 1972. That was the year William V. Bidwell took sole control as managing general partner and made many changes in the coaching staff and players.

Carpenter did work with and help coach future Pro Football Hall of Fame winners during his time with the Cardinals. These included Dan Dierdorf inducted in 1996, Jackie Smith inducted in 1994, Larry Wilson inducted in 1978 and Roger Wehrli inducted in 2007.

=== Houston Oilers ===
In 1973, Carpenter's first coaching season there, the Oilers won only 1 game during the entire season. This was a 31 to 27 win over the Baltimore Colts. On a brighter note, Elvin Bethea won his 3rd Pro Bowl team spot. In 1974, the Oilers won their season opener at home by defeating the San Diego Chargers with a 21 to 14 win. The 1974 season was the best year with a 7 win & 7 loss season. And best of all, they defeated their rival Cleveland Browns for the first time ever with a 28 to 24 victory.

Carpenter was the receivers and tight ends coach brought in by the new Oiler general manager Sid Gillman to work with head coach Bill Peterson and stayed during Gillman's tenure. After Peterson was fired in October 1973, Gillman took over as head coach. Gillman was inducted as a coach into the Pro Football Hall of Fame in 1983 and the College Football Hall of Fame in 1989.

Carpenter worked with and helped coach future Pro Football Hall of Fame winners during his time the Oilers. These include Elvin Bethea inducted in 2003 and Ken Houston inducted in 1986. Head coach Sid Gillman was inducted in 1989.

=== Green Bay Packers ===
Carpenter was the receivers and tight ends coach for the Green Bay Packers under head coaches (HC) Bart Starr (1975––1983) and Forrest Gregg (1984–1987) from 1975 to 1985.

Poor personnel decisions typified this Packer time period. A notorious example includes the 1974 trade in which Dan Devine (HC 1971–1974) acting as GM sent five 1975 and 1976 draft picks (two first-rounders, two second-rounders and a third rounder) to the Los Angeles Rams for aging quarterback John Hadl, who would spend only 1½ seasons in Green Bay. This continued in the 1989, when players such as Barry Sanders, Deion Sanders, and Derrick Thomas were available, but the Packers chose offensive lineman Tony Mandarich with the second overall pick in the NFL draft. Though rated highly by nearly every professional scout at the time, Mandarich's performance failed to meet expectations. ESPN has rated Mandarich as the third "biggest sports flop" in the last 25 years. This must have been a frustrating time for Carpenter but he focused on the basics and coached on for his beloved Packers.

Carpenter worked with and/or coached with the following Pro Football Hall of Famers during his coaching tenure with the Packers. These include coach Bart Starr who was inducted as a player in 1977, coach Forrest Gregg who was inducted as a player in 1977 and James Lofton, inducted in 2003.

=== Detroit Lions ===
Carpenter was the Detroit Lions receivers and tight ends coach for 1987 and 1988. He worked with head coaches Darryl Rogers and Wayne Fontes. At the end of the 1988 season, Fontes hired Mouse Davis and June Jones as assistants and installed the Run & Shoot offense. This required the letting go of Carpenter and other assistant coaches. Fontes would later abandon the Run & Shoot offense.

Carpenter worked with and/or helped coach the following Pro Football Hall of Famers. These include Lem Barney inducted in 1992, Barry Sanders inducted in 2004 and coach Dick LeBeau inducted as a player in 2010.

=== Philadelphia Eagles ===
Carpenter was the Eagles wide receivers coach from 1990 to 1992 and the wide receivers/tight ends coach in 1993 and 1994. Carpenter again coached James Lofton.

=== Later coaching ===
In 1995, Carpenter went back to Southwest Texas State University, now known as Texas State University–San Marcos and was the running backs coach under head coach Jim Bob Helduser. In 1989, Carpenter had coached at the Southwest Texas State University as a backfield coach under head coach John O’Hara. In 1996, Carpenter coached the Frankfurt Galaxy of the World League of American Football. He would coach with the Ohio Cannon of the Regional Football League in 1999 and with the San Antonio Matadors of the Spring Football League in 2000. His last coaching position was with the Cincinnati Marshals of the National Indoor Football League in 2005.

== Death and honors ==
In 1996, after 47 years of playing and coaching professional NFL football, Carpenter reluctantly retired from the game he loved because of his health. On November 14, 2010, with his family at his side, he died from pulmonary fibrosis. Carpenter's last public appearance was in Green Bay's Lambeau Field for the "Alumni Weekend" on September 16 and 17, 2010.

Carpenter was inducted into the Arkansas Sports Hall of Fame in 1988, and the University of Arkansas Sports Hall of Honor in 2000. The "Lewis Carpenter University of Arkansas Scholarship" has been established in his memory through Chase Bank in New Braunfels, Texas.

=== CTE ===
Carpenter left his brain for science. Always interested in helping and teaching, he gave the last part of himself to test for chronic traumatic encephalopathy (CTE). In the first week of December 2011, test results confirmed that Carpenter had an advanced case of CTE. He is one of at least 345 NFL players to be diagnosed after death with this disease.

CTE is a progressive degenerative disease found in people who have had repeated hits to the head. CTE is most commonly found in professional athletes who have experienced repeated concussions or other brain trauma.

== In media ==
In the 2009 book by John Eisenberg, That First Season: How Vince Lombardi Took the Worst Team in the NFL and Set It on the Path to Glory, Lew Carpenter is mentioned on 30 pages of its 304 hardback pages. Carpenter participated in a 2001 reunion documentary on Vince Lombardi and his Green Bay Packers called With Love & Respect: A Reunion of the Lombardi Green Bay Packers.

== See also ==
- American Football League coaches
- List of NFL players with chronic traumatic encephalopathy
