= Allie Sherman =

American gridiron football player and coach (1923–2015)

No. 10
- Positions: Quarterback, running back, defensive back

Personal information
- Born: February 10, 1923; Brooklyn, New York, U.S.
- Died: January 3, 2015 (aged 91); New York City, New York, U.S.
- Listed height: 5 ft 11 in (1.80 m)
- Listed weight: 175 lb (79 kg)

Career information
- High school: Boys (Brooklyn)
- College: Brooklyn College (1939-1942)
- NFL draft: 1943: undrafted

Career history

Playing
- Philadelphia-Pittsburgh Steagles (1943); Philadelphia Eagles (1944–1947)

Coaching
- New York Giants (1949–1952) Backfield coach; Winnipeg Blue Bombers (1953–1956) Head coach; New York Giants (1959–1960) Offensive coordinator; New York Giants (1961–1968) Head coach

Awards and highlights
- 2× AP NFL Coach of the Year (1961, 1962)

Career NFL statistics
- Passing attempts: 135
- Passing completions: 66
- Completion percentage: 48.9%
- TD–INT: 9–10
- Passing yards: 823
- Passer rating: 59.6
- Stats at Pro Football Reference

Head coaching record
- Regular season: NFL: 57–51–4 (.527); WIFU: 24–22–2 (.521)
- Postseason: NFL: 0–3 (.000); WIFU: 4–6–1 (.409)
- Career: NFL: 57–54–4 (.513); WIFU: 28–28–3 (.500)
- Coaching profile at Pro Football Reference

Alex "Allie" Sherman (February 10, 1923 – January 3, 2015) was an American football player and coach who played 51 games in six seasons in the National Football League (NFL) as a quarterback and defensive back, and afterward served as head coach of the Winnipeg Blue Bombers of the Canadian Football League (CFL) and of the New York Giants of the NFL. He later worked as a cable television and sports marketing executive and media personality.

Sherman was head coach of the NFL's New York Giants from 1961 to the 1969 preseason. He won three consecutive Eastern Conference titles with the Giants from 1961 to 1963, and coached in three NFL Pro Bowls. Sherman collected two NFL Coach of the Year Awards, in 1961 and 1962, the first time such an honor was awarded to the same person in consecutive years. He was the first "media" NFL head coach, producing and hosting his own shows on television and radio, and becoming a frequent on-air football analyst. After 1963, however, he failed to lead them to a winning record in his next five seasons as coach.

After coaching, he had a long career at Warner Communications (today WarnerMedia), where he developed the first cable television sports networks, pioneered interactive and pay-per-view television and events, oversaw and marketed the New York Cosmos soccer team, and produced for ABC and worldwide syndication Pelé's farewell game event (with Muhammad Ali and other celebrities). Later, new New York City Mayor Rudolph Giuliani tapped Sherman to become president of the failing New York City Off-Track Betting Corporation (OTB), which, within two years, Sherman made profitable for the first time while revitalizing its tawdry image.

== Early life ==
Sherman was Jewish, and his parents migrated to New York in 1920. Sherman was born in Brownsville in New York City's borough of Brooklyn, then lived in New Lots, East New York, and Crown Heights. He attended P.S. 202, and for junior high school attended P.S. 149, which was also attended by actor Danny Kaye and Henry Cohen.

Always playing sandlot sports, especially football, as a sophomore at 13 years old and weighing 125 pounds, he tried out for the football team at Boys High School in Brooklyn. The coach told him he was too small and should try handball instead, and because of his small size and young age his mother refused to sign the required permission slip. Sherman became the captain of the Boys' High handball team, which won division titles. To earn spending money, on weekends he and his doubles partner would "cross over" to the tougher side of Brooklyn to hustle older players who bet big money and hopefully did not recognize them. He graduated in 1939 with a 96 average at the age of 16, and entered college.

== Brooklyn College ==
Sherman entered Brooklyn College, and tried out for football again, but this time coach Lou Oshins took him on as a quarterback, recalling, "His dedication to football was absolute, astonishing." When Sherman's mother saw how violent the game was, however, she made him quit. He and Oshins eventually made his mother relent. During the summer before his sophomore year, while Sherman waited on tables in the Catskills, Oshins mailed Sherman weekly sections of Clark Shaughnessy's book about the new T-formation, leading Sherman to refer to himself as "a correspondence school quarterback". Sherman had also taken a football with him to the Catskills, and spent time throwing it at trees to improve his accuracy.

He became the starting quarterback in 1940, and played for the team from 1940 to 1942. One of the few colleges running the T-formation, he captained the 1941–42 Brooklyn College team that upset the favored cross-town rival City College, and completed seven straight passes in a "scrimmage" against an NFL team then called the Brooklyn Dodgers. A teammate was future longtime Boston Celtics play-by-play man Johnny Most. Sherman graduated cum laude in 1943 just have turned 20 years of age, and 5' 10" and 160 pounds.

Sherman is a member of the National Jewish Sports Hall of Fame in Long Island, New York, and the Brooklyn College Hall of Fame.

== NFL playing career ==
After he graduated in 1943 (a psychology major), the Philadelphia Eagles' future Hall of Fame coach, Earl "Greasy" Neale, took Sherman on as a "prospect" and to help the Eagles and their All-Pro quarterback Roy Zimmerman convert from a single wing offense into the T-formation. Neale commented, "Never have I seen a player with a greater understanding of the game. He was so dedicated, he insisted on rooming with a lineman. He wanted to absorb the way a lineman thought." He called Sherman "the smartest man in football". In his rookie season, he played with a combined Philadelphia Eagles and Pittsburgh Steelers squad (due to manpower shortages caused by World War II). The team, called the Steagles, finished third in the NFL East with a record of 5–4–1.

Playing both quarterback and defensive back, Sherman spent five seasons with the Eagles, who finished second in the NFL East from 1944 to 1946. In 1946, he completed 17 of 33 passes for 264 yards, and led the league in yards-per-passing-attempt (8.00). The following year, he helped lead the Eagles to the NFL East title with a record of 8–4–0. They tied the Pittsburgh Steelers for first, and then defeated Pittsburgh in a playoff to reach the NFL championship game, which they lost to the Chicago Cardinals, 28–21. In all, he completed 48.9% of his 135 pass attempts for nine touchdowns, while running for four more. After the 1947 season, having played in 51 NFL games, Sherman took Neale's advice and shifted to coaching.

== Coaching career ==
Sherman spent the 1948 season as a rookie head coach and quarterback for the Paterson Panthers, a minor league New Jersey team, and won the championship. In 1949, upon Neale's recommendation, he became backfield coach for the New York Giants under head coach Steve Owen, and converted Charlie Conerly into a T-formation quarterback. In a 1950 preseason exhibition game against the Ottawa Rough Riders of the Canadian Football League, Sherman came out of retirement to play quarterback for the Giants in the first half of a game which New York won by the score of 27–6.

When Owen retired as the Giants' coach after the 1953 season, and Sherman did not get his job, he became head coach of the CFL's Winnipeg Blue Bombers. The Bombers made the playoffs three years in a row; and, with the CFL's 12-man squads and broad pre-snap motion rules, Sherman gained a reputation for designing complex offensive schemes that made defenses dizzy. "We had so many guys moving before the snap, it looked like a damned ballet", Sherman said. One of his players was future Hall of Famer Minnesota Vikings coach Bud Grant. In 1957 he returned to the Giants as a scout, and then rejoined the coaching staff in 1959 as offensive coordinator, replacing Vince Lombardi when Lombardi was appointed head coach of the Green Bay Packers. Lombardi, a good friend, wanted Sherman to join him as the Packers' offensive coordinator; but Sherman wanted the Giants' head coaching position.

In 1961, Sherman was promoted to head coach. He traded for a number of younger players to bolster an aging squad, such as star quarterback Y. A. Tittle, swift receiver Del Shofner, and defensive backs Erich Barnes and Allan Webb, and then led the Giants to the NFL Eastern Conference championship, which landed them in the NFL championship game. Although they lost to the Packers on the road, 37–0, Sherman was named NFL Coach of the Year because the Giants had improved from a 6–4–2 record in 1960 to 10–3–1 in 1961. The following year, with running back Frank Gifford returning from injury, Sherman led the Giants back to the NFL title game after repeating as NFL East champions with a 12–2 record. He was again named NFL Coach of the Year, the first awarded that in consecutive seasons, although his Giants again fell to Green Bay, this time 16–7 in Yankee Stadium. In 1963 the Giants won their third straight Eastern title, but lost in the championship game on the road, 14–10, to the Chicago Bears, who injured Tittle's leg, taking him out of the game. It was the Giants' last appearance in an NFL championship game until Super Bowl XXI in 1986–87.

Sherman and his coaching staff coached three NFL Pro Bowl games, from 1961 to 1963. In 1965 and 1966, with the support of owner Wellington Mara, Sherman added two retired Giants to his staff, Emlen Tunnell and Rosey Brown. In addition to being future Hall of Famers, both were African American, the first black assistant coaches in the NFL. With much racial strife in the country at the time, this caused controversy in both the press and parts of the league, particularly in the still-segregated southern areas. In 1968 Sherman and his coaching staff were invited to coach the Senior Bowl's North Team, played in Mobile, Alabama. During the practice week, the Bowl organization held a big banquet at a local country club. Shortly beforehand, Sherman was told that Tunnell and Brown were not invited because of the club's segregation policy. Sherman quickly informed the Bowl committee that no Giants personnel would attend the banquet unless everyone was invited. When it was clear nothing could change his mind, the club relented. That was the first evening in the club's history that two African-Americans were seated and served in the dining room. Sherman remained close friends with both until their deaths.

Sherman coached the Giants for another five seasons, but with an aging defense and retirements of Tittle, Gifford, and others, the team began rebuilding with younger players and went through up and down years. Some fans, used to a playoff club, did not like trades of favorite established players like Rosey Grier, Don Chandler, and Sam Huff. Some trades, however, authorized by Mara, occurred for unpublicized, inside-locker-room reasons. By 1966 some spectators at Yankee Stadium took to chanting "Goodbye Allie", waving banners to that effect and even putting the slogan to song. This never bothered Sherman; he told reporters that his pro philosophy was "They paid their money, and can do what they want," and joked that he owned the rights to the banners and song and made a fortune in royalties. Despite an improved season record of 7–7 in 1967, while being the leading NFL offensive team for much of it, and 7–7 again in 1968, one game away from the playoffs, after a poor preseason performance in 1969 (including a 37–14 loss to the Super Bowl champion New York Jets, led by Joe Namath, whom Sherman wanted to draft in 1965), Sherman was dismissed in September, a week before the regular season, finishing 57–51–4 for his Giants coaching career. With a ten-year contract signed in 1965 at $50,000 ($510,000 in current dollar terms) annually, he was on the payroll through 1974.

== NFL and media ==
Friends with new NFL Commissioner Pete Rozelle, a former public relations executive, Sherman saw merit in Rozelle's strategy to increase the NFL's value by increasing its television coverage, franchises, and entertainment marketing, which would expand NFL rights fees and revenues. Sherman developed himself into the first media-savvy professional coach. It was his policy to face the press regularly and answer questions with candor (but never knocking his players). He conducted never-before-done daily press conferences during training camp and, every Monday morning after a game, presented game film clips and evaluations. He held a big Christmas party for all of press, even his critics. Some critiqued Sherman as sometimes being "very Madison Avenue-ish."

Rethinking his 1963 rejection of writer George Plimpton's proposal to allow Plimpton to pose in training camp as a rookie quarterback (resulting in bestseller and movie Paper Lion), in 1966 Sherman and Mara accepted author Eliot Asinof's proposal to spend two years with the team having total freedom and unlimited access to players, coaches, and executives, even closed coaches meetings. This resulted in a never-before seen behind-the-scenes look of the inner world of the professionals, Seven Days To Sunday, published in 1968 (whose opening line is, "Allie Sherman's hundred-hour week began around 7am [on Monday]").

He produced and owned the first pro football coach's weekly television program, on independent NYC station WPIX, reviewing film of the Giants' prior game and discussing football with invited players, coaches, and guests, giving many fans their first peek inside professional football and "up close and personal" moments with the players. He co-produced and hosted a Monday night radio program, Ask Allie, airing on the Giants' station, WNEW, where it was just himself sitting in a booth, smoking a cigar, and directly taking fans' call-in questions and comments. The press respected Sherman for facing fans weekly (especially just 24 hours after a tough loss) and always treating them graciously. He also hosted the first nationally syndicated TV panel-discussion sports show called Pro Football Special, where, in reviewing touchdown plays, he would say that the runner, once in the clear, "goes in for the touch."

During the 1980s and early 1990s he became the first pre-game pro football analyst and a frequent guest on the nascent ESPN and the networks. He also helped create what became NFL Films. In 1962 Sherman's friend and Giants fan Ed Sabol asked Sherman and Mara for exclusive rights to film game and off-field footage. Sabol would rush the film reels out of Yankee Stadium in team laundry baskets, spend all night developing them, and create special content for network sports shows. This enterprise evolved into NFL Films, eventually under Sabol's son Steve, with its large NFL catalogue and unique programming. In 1985 Sabol and Sherman co-created and produced a new type of show, Monday Night Matchup, shown on ESPN just before ABC's national Monday Night game, where Sherman and co-hosts, such as Ron "Jaws" Jaworski, would break down the teams into key match-ups and use stop-action film and graphics to analyze the upcoming game. This format later became a standard feature in ESPN's and the networks' sports programming.

== Second career, after football ==
After Sherman was released by the Giants, he turned down several coaching offers from around the league. Foreseeing the coming major increase in NFL revenue and franchise values, he then wanted to be involved in a team management-ownership position. He led an effort with several New York friends and other parties to purchase an NFL franchise. They came close several times, including the New York Jets in 1970, but reluctant team owners and some investors' concerns about valuation prevented a purchase. One of the disappointed investors was Sherman's close friend, Warner Communications Inc.'s CEO Steve Ross, who was building cable television franchises and had recently purchased Warner Bros. Studio for its film and TV content. Ross agreed with Sherman that sports content also had great potential value, with cable television as a delivery system. Ross asked Sherman to join WCI and use his coaching and media expertise to build good teams and develop these potential assets.

While helping WCI win cable franchises in additional cities, Sherman was part of WCI's experimental QUBE system in Columbus, Ohio: the nation's first interactive cable system, enabling QUBE customers to individually order film and other content direct from home on a pay-per-view basis. Sherman recognized its marketing and revenue potential for sports programming. He created cable's first sports subscription package with Ohio State University Chancellor Gordon Gee. To provide special content for its Pittsburgh system, Sherman negotiated the purchase of minority ownership of the Pittsburgh Pirates. He managed WCI's position and built a similar Pirates subscription package for WCI cable customers. In each WCI cable system, in big cities like Dallas and Chicago, Sherman continued to acquire college and professional sports rights, and then built regional sports networks to exhibit the games and specially created related programming. Eventually they were all purchased, and are known today as the Fox Sports Networks. Sherman positioned WCI's growing cable systems as an integral part of the sales and marketing of national pay-per-view events, especially high-priced championship fights. He negotiated special rights deals with impresarios and friends Don King and Bob Arum.

In the mid-1970s, Ross created a soccer team, the New York Cosmos, which acquired talent from around the world, such as Brazil's Pelé and Germany's Franz Beckenbauer. The Cosmos became the emerging North American Soccer League's premier team and played at home in New Jersey's Meadowlands' 75,000-seat stadium (where the Giants and Jets played) to small crowds of mostly the nationality of the Cosmos's opponent. Sherman took over the team's management and marketing, to expand the fan base to bigger, broader audiences. Sherman used Pelé and other stars to sell the game's excitement, reached out to regional youth soccer clubs, negotiated a special television deal for more exposure, and made Cosmos games into an event. The next season, Meadowlands stadium sold out every Cosmos game with broad, inclusive audiences. Sherman became close with Pelé (who Pelé called "Allie Boss" and later they both shared WCI office space), and Pelé requested that Sherman produce his 1977 farewell game. Sherman put together a package of an ABC special game presentation, a worldwide syndicate of TV networks in 117 countries (including the Soviet Union), global sponsors to market it, had Frank Gifford as host with myriad celebrities and officials, ending with a special award presented by Muhammad Ali. It remains, as of 2014, was the most highly rated non-World Cup soccer event.

In 1994, new New York mayor Rudy Giuliani (one of whose campaign slogans was "OTB is the only bookie in the world that loses money every year"), asked Sherman to become president of the New York City Off-Track Betting Corporation (OTB) and try to turn OTB into a money maker with a better image. With the mayor's support, during the next three years Sherman instituted new, multimedia marketing campaigns using NYC celebrities as spokespeople, closed a number of run-down OTB parlors around the city while cleaning up the remaining ones, opened OTB new betting facilities in upscale sports restaurants, cut costs and revamped antiquated OTB procedures, and created a phone betting system to provide customer convenience and increase volume. Also, in a private-public partnership, Sherman worked with the New York Racing Association and Warner Cable in a joint venture with OTB to create a new, low-cost daily racing channel, showing races from around the country that customers could bet on over the phone and then watch at home. The OTB Channel continued to run for over twenty years, in the black. By 1996 OTB was profitable for the first time, with a new, fresher image.

== Personal life ==
Marty Glickman, former Olympian and sportscaster, introduced Allie to his future wife, Joan, in the early 1950s. Throughout the years, Sherman was involved with many charities, including children charities, especially for those with special needs, the Boys and Girls Clubs of America, and the Veteran's Bedside Network (where he regularly visited Veterans' hospitals, to talk football and sports with disabled veterans). On January 3, 2015, he died at the age of 91.

== NFL player record ==
Physical: 5 ft 10 in, 168 pounds

Games: 51
Passes completed: 66
Passes attempted: 135
Passing percentage: 48.9
Passing yards: 823
Passing touchdowns: 9
Interceptions thrown: 10

Rushes: 93
Rushing yards: 44
Rushing average: 0.5
Rushing touchdowns: 4
Fumbles: 10

Interceptions: 2

== Head coaching record ==
Team	Year	Regular season					Postseason			
Team	Year	Won	Lost	Ties	Win %	Finish	Won	Lost	Win %	Result
NYG	1961	10	3	1	.769	1st in NFL East	0	1	.000	Lost to the Green Bay Packers in 1961 NFL Championship.
NYG	1962	12	2	0	.857	1st in NFL East	0	1	.000	Lost to the Green Bay Packers in 1962 NFL Championship.
NYG	1963	11	3	0	.786	1st in NFL East	0	1	.000	Lost to the Chicago Bears in 1963 NFL Championship.
NYG	1964	2	10	2	.167	7th in NFL East	-	-	-	-
NYG	1965	7	7	0	.500	2nd in NFL East	-	-	-	-
NYG	1966	1	12	1	.077	8th in NFL East	-	-	-	-
NYG	1967	7	7	0	.500	2nd in NFL Century	-	-	-	-
NYG	1968	7	7	0	.500	2nd in NFL Capital	-	-	-	-
Total		57	51	4	.528		0	3	.000	

== See also ==
- History of the New York Giants (1925–1978)
- List of left-handed quarterbacks
- List of select Jewish football players
