= 1962 NFL Championship Game =

Coordinates: 40.827°N 73.928°W

- 1962 NFL Championship Game program
Green Bay Packers (Western) (13–1)	New York Giants (Eastern) (12–2)
16	7
Head coach: Vince Lombardi	Head coach: Allie Sherman
	1	2	3	4	Total
GB	3	7	3	3	16
NYG	0	0	7	0	7
- Date: December 30, 1962
- Stadium: Yankee Stadium; Bronx, New York
- MVP: Ray Nitschke (Linebacker; Green Bay)
- Favorite: Green Bay by 6½ to 7 points
- Referee: Emil Heintz
- Attendance: 64,892

TV in the United States
- Network: NBC
- Announcers: Chris Schenkel; Ray Scott

Radio in the United States
- Network: NBC
- Announcers: Ken Coleman; Ted Moore

Location in the United States

The 1962 NFL Championship Game was the 30th NFL title game, played on December 30, 1962, at Yankee Stadium in New York City. It matched the New York Giants (12–2) of the Eastern Conference and Green Bay Packers (13–1) of the Western Conference, the defending league champions.

The Packers were led by hall of fame head coach Vince Lombardi, in his fourth year, and the Giants by Allie Sherman, in his second season. Green Bay was favored by 6½ points. The attendance for the game was 64,892, and the weather during the game was so cold that television crews used bonfires to thaw out their cameras, and one cameraman suffered frostbite. The conditions also made throwing the ball difficult.

Green Bay won 16–7, behind the performances of game Most Valuable Player linebacker Ray Nitschke, and fullback Jim Taylor. Right guard Jerry Kramer, filling in as placekicker for the injured Paul Hornung, scored ten points with three field goals and an extra point. The Giants fumbled twice, with Nitschke recovering both for the Packers, while the Packers recovered all five of their own fumbles and intercepted a Giants pass.

This was the third and final NFL title game played at Yankee Stadium; the others were in 1956 and 1958, with the Giants winning the first. The state next would host a league championship game in two years later in Buffalo, while the borough of Queens in New York City hosted once more when the New York Jets hosted the 1968 AFL Championship Game at Shea Stadium in Queens, winning over the Oakland Raiders.

Afterwards, the area commonly known as the NYC metropolitan area had a lengthy hosting drought, as the next league championship game was the Super Bowl XLVIII on February 2014 at MetLife Stadium in East Rutherford, New Jersey (commonly known as an inner suburb of New York City), which resulted in the Seattle Seahawks defeating the Denver Broncos 43–8.

Previous championship games hosted by the Giants in New York were played across the Harlem River at the Polo Grounds in 1934, 1938, 1944, and 1946; the Giants won the first two. An additional title game was played at the Polo Grounds in 1936, hosted by the Boston Redskins and won by the Packers.

== Background ==
The 1962 game was a rematch of the 1961 game, won by Green Bay at home, 37–0. It was the Packers' third straight appearance in the championship game, and the Giants' fourth in five seasons, and fifth in the last seven.

Green Bay began the 1962 season 10–0, including a 49–0 victory over the Philadelphia Eagles, where they gained 628 yards to Philadelphia's 54. Before the game, 10,000 fans at a New York Knicks game in Madison Square Garden spontaneously began chanting "Beat Green Bay! Beat Green Bay!", and when the 18,000 tickets available to non-season ticket holders went on sale, they sold within three hours.

Due to the NFL's blackout policy which aimed to protect gate receipts, until 1973, fans in a team's home market could not watch their team's regular season and playoff games on television, even if they were title games. New York fans made reservations for motels in Pennsylvania, New Jersey, and Connecticut so they could watch the game out of the 75-mile (120 km) blackout zone, and even though the game was played in 17 °F (−8 °C) temperatures with 35–40 mph (56–64 km/h) winds, only 299 of the 65,000+ Giant fans who bought tickets to the sold out game stayed home.

Although the weather was temperate the previous day, during the contest it became so cold due to wind chill that a cameraman filming the game suffered frostbite, and television crews used dugout bonfires to thaw out their cameras. Broadcaster Art Rust, Jr. later described the weather as "barbaric". The cold conditions favored the Packers who used a run-oriented offense led by Taylor, while the Giants featured a more pass-heavy offense led by quarterback Y. A. Tittle who had passed for 3,224 yards and 33 touchdowns in the regular season.

Ticket prices for the game at Yankee Stadium ranged from eight to twelve dollars ($68.11 to $100.13 in 2018 valuation).

== Game summary ==
The wind caused the ball to be blown off the tee three times during the opening kickoff, and a Green Bay player had to hold the ball onto the tee so Willie Wood (later ejected for bumping back judge Tom Kelleher) could kick it off. After a Jerry Kramer field goal made the score 3–0 in favor of Green Bay in the first quarter, the Giants drove to the Green Bay 15 yard line behind short passes from Tittle. Tittle then tried to hit tight end Joe Walton near the goal line, but a timely Packer blitz by Forester and Nitschke allowed the latter to deflect the pass which was intercepted by fellow linebacker Dan Currie. During most of the first and second quarter, the teams ran the ball for short gains. The Giants repeatedly hit Taylor hard, and he suffered cuts to his arm and tongue. Near halftime, the Giants Phil King fumbled on their own 28, and Nitschke recovered. A halfback option pass from Paul Hornung to flanker Boyd Dowler took the Packers to the Giants seven-yard line. On the following play Taylor used an outside fake before going back inside to run untouched into the end zone.

The weather worsened by halftime and the wind swirled dust around the stadium, tearing apart the ballpark's U.S. flag, and knocking over a television camera. Passing became even more difficult; the longest pass of the day was a 25-yard one from Tittle to Walton. After blocking a Max McGee punt and recovering it for a touchdown to pull the game to 10–7 in the third quarter, the Giants defense forced the Packers into a three and out on their next possession. Sam Horner fumbled on a punt return at the Giants 42-yard line however, and Nitschke recovered. Five plays later, Kramer kicked a field goal to make the score 13–7. Tittle, with the aid of two Packers penalties, then drove the Giants from their own 20 to the Green Bay 18 on the ensuing drive. New York then incurred two holding penalties, pushing them back to their own 40-yard line and ending their drive (holding penalties at the time were assessed from the spot of the foul). Led by Taylor, who repeatedly ran for key first downs, the Packers advanced the ball down to the New York end of the field, where Kramer kicked a third field goal (on five attempts) to make the score 16–7 with under two minutes to play. Tittle led a desperation drive which ended at the Packer 7 as time ran out. Green Bay recovered all five of their fumbles during the game, while the Giants lost both of theirs. Kramer had not played in the previous year's title game, after a lower leg injury in late October sidelined him for the rest of the 1961 season.

== Legacy ==
MVP Ray Nitschke's appearance on CBS Television's What’s My Line on the evening of December 30, 1962 after the 1962 NFL Championship Game. John Charles Daly, the legendary host of What’s My Line, is smiling on his left.

A few hours after this game, Nitschke, who was the game's Most Valuable Player, appeared on CBS TV's What's My Line? wearing thick eyeglasses and a dark, conservative suit to hide his size. Panelists Martin Gabel and Bennett Cerf, both of whom were at the game and both Giants fans, recognized him. As the game's outstanding player, Nitschke was awarded a 1963 Chevrolet Corvette by Sport magazine.

Ed Sabol's film company, Blair Motion Pictures, paid $3,000 for the film rights for the game; the company would later become NFL Films.

The 1962 Packers team is considered one of the best in NFL history. 11 members of the 1962 Packer team are in the Hall of Fame in Canton, Ohio.

== Scoring summary ==
Green Bay Packers 16, New York Giants 7

Quarter	1	2	3	4	Total
Packers	3	7	3	3	16
Giants	0	0	7	0	7

- Date: December 30, 1962
- Game time: 2:05 p.m. EST
- Pro-Football-Reference

Game information

- First quarter
  - GB – Jerry Kramer 26-yard field goal. Packers 3–0
- Second quarter
  - GB – Jim Taylor 7-yard run (Kramer kick). Packers 10–0
- Third quarter
  - NY – Jim Collier block punt recovery in end zone (Don Chandler kick). Packers 10–7
  - GB – Jerry Kramer 29-yard field goal. Packers 13–7
- Fourth quarter
  - GB – Jerry Kramer 30-yard field goal. Packers 16–7

Top passers

- GB – Bart Starr – 9/21, 85 yards
- NY – Y.A. Tittle – 18/41, 197 yards, 1 INT

Top rushers

- GB – Jim Taylor – 31 rushes, 85 yards, 1 TD
- NY – Alex Webster – 15 rushes, 56 yards

Top receivers

- GB – Boyd Dowler – 4 receptions, 48 yards
- NY – Joe Walton – 5 receptions, 75 yards

== Starting lineups ==
Hall of Fame inductee

Green Bay	Position	New York
OFFENSE
Max McGee	SE	Del Shofner
Norm Masters	LT	Rosey Brown
Fuzzy Thurston	LG	Darrell Dess
Jim Ringo	C	Ray Wietecha
Jerry Kramer	RG	Greg Larson
Forrest Gregg	RT	Jack Stroud
Ron Kramer	TE	Joe Walton
Boyd Dowler	FL	Frank Gifford
Bart Starr	QB	Y. A. Tittle
Paul Hornung	HB	Phil King
Jim Taylor	FB	Alex Webster
DEFENSE
Willie Davis	LE	Jim Katcavage
Dave Hanner	LDT	Dick Modzelewski
Henry Jordan	RDT	Rosey Grier
Bill Quinlan	RE	Andy Robustelli
Dan Currie	LOLB	Bill Winter
Ray Nitschke	MLB	Sam Huff
Bill Forester	ROLB	Tom Scott
Herb Adderley	LCB	Erich Barnes
Jesse Whittenton	RCB	Dick Lynch
Hank Gremminger	SS	Allan Webb
Willie Wood	FS	Jimmy Patton

== Officials ==
- Referee: (9) Emil Heintz
- Umpire: (57) Joseph Connell
- Head linesman: (30) George Murphy
- Back judge: (25) Tom Kelleher
- Field judge: (21) Fred Swearingen
- Alternate referee: Norm Schachter
- Alternate umpire: Lou Palazzi
- Alternate back judge: Bruce Alford

The NFL had five game officials in 1962; the line judge was added in 1965 and the side judge in 1978.

== Players' shares ==
The gross receipts for the game, including $615,000 radio and television rights, were just under $1,243,000, the highest to date. Each player on the winning Packers team received $5,888, while Giants players made $4,166 each.

== Quotes ==
I don't remember ever being hit so hard. I bled all game. They really came to play.

— Taylor, who rushed for 85 yards on 31 carries in the game.

That was the only time all day they didn't kill me. It felt funny.

— Taylor, referring to his second-quarter touchdown run.

That was the hardest football game I ever played in.

— Hornung

It was the coach's backyard and his first time back in the big city in a playoff game. We knew how much it meant to him. There was considerable pressure and we understood it was going to be a substantial battle.

— Kramer, referring to Lombardi who was an offensive coach for Giants before becoming the Packers head coach.

Several times we noted that the benches on the sideline, those heavy benches that they sat on over there, they were blown over during the course of the game.

— Green Bay quarterback Bart Starr

The ball was like a diving duck. I threw one pass and it almost came back to me. The short ones worked, but the long ball broke up. We needed the long one.

— Tittle

We knew it was going to be a hard-hitting game and that's what football was. It was a great game just as far as making tackles and just whacking guys. I'm sorry we lost. It was horrible.

— Giants defensive back Dick Lynch.

We're still the better team.

— Frank Gifford

== See also ==
- Giants–Packers rivalry
- 1962 NFL season
- History of the NFL championship
- 1962 American Football League Championship Game
