= Hank Gremminger =

American football player (1933–2001)

No. 46
- Position: Defensive back

Personal information
- Born: September 1, 1933; Windthorst, Texas, U.S.
- Died: November 2, 2001 (aged 68); Weatherford, Texas, U.S.
- Listed height: 6 ft 1 in (1.85 m)
- Listed weight: 201 lb (91 kg)

Career information
- High school: Weatherford
- College: Baylor
- NFL draft: 1956: 7th round, 80th overall pick

Career history
- Green Bay Packers (1956–1965); Dallas Cowboys (1966)*; Los Angeles Rams (1966)
- * Offseason or practice squad member only

Awards and highlights
- 3× NFL champion (1961, 1962, 1965); Green Bay Packers Hall of Fame; Third-team All-American (1955); 2× First-team All-SWC (1954, 1955); Baylor University Athletics Hall of Fame

Career NFL statistics
- Interceptions: 29
- Fumble recoveries: 7
- Stats at Pro Football Reference

Charles Henry Gremminger (September 1, 1933 – November 2, 2001) was an American professional football player who was a defensive back in the National Football League (NFL). He played for 11 seasons from 1956 to 1965 with the Green Bay Packers and in 1966 for the Los Angeles Rams. He played college football as an end for the Baylor Bears.

== Early life ==
Born in Windthorst, Texas, Gremminger was raised in Weatherford, Texas and graduated from Weatherford High School in 1952.

== Pro football ==
Gremminger was selected in the seventh round of the 1956 NFL draft by the Green Bay Packers. Head coach Vince Lombardi arrived in 1959 and Gremminger was part of three NFL championship teams in 1961, 1962, and 1965.

In 1966, Gremminger was traded to the Dallas Cowboys in June but left during the first week of training camp. He was also with the expansion Atlanta Falcons before being named to the roster of the Los Angeles Rams in late October.

He was named to the Green Bay Packers Hall of Fame in 1976.

== Late life and death ==
Back in Texas, Gremminger was a contractor and later worked in the banking and insurance business and was a county commissioner in Parker County.

Gremminger died at age 68 of cardiac arrest in Weatherford.
