= 2007 NFC Championship Game =

2008 American football postseason game

New York Giants (5) (10–6)	Green Bay Packers (2) (13–3)
23	20
Head coach: Tom Coughlin	Head coach: Mike McCarthy
	1	2	3	4	OT	Total
NYG	3	3	14	0	3	23
GB	0	10	7	3	0	20
- Date: January 20, 2008
- Stadium: Lambeau Field; Green Bay, Wisconsin, U.S.
- Favorite: Packers by 7.5
- Referee: Terry McAulay
- Attendance: 72,740

TV in the United States
- Network: Fox
- Announcers: Joe Buck, Troy Aikman, Pam Oliver, and Chris Myers

The 2007 National Football Conference (NFC) Championship Game was an American football game played between the New York Giants and the Green Bay Packers on January 20, 2008, at Lambeau Field in Green Bay, Wisconsin, United States. The Packers finished the season 13–3, winning the NFC North, while securing the second seed in the playoffs. The Giants entered the playoffs as a Wild Card team, with a record of 10–6. They did not win the NFC East, which was won by the Dallas Cowboys, who secured the first seed in the playoffs via a head-to-head tiebreaker with the Packers. The Giants beat the Tampa Bay Buccaneers and the Cowboys in the Wild Card and Divisional rounds, respectively. The Packers beat the Seattle Seahawks in the Divisional round. By virtue of their higher seeding, the Packers were given home field advantage for the Championship Game. The game was a continuation of the two teams' rivalry, which included five NFL Championship Games from the 1930s to the 1960s.

The game was marked by cold weather, with the wind chill factor bringing the temperature down to −23 °F (−31 °C), making it the second coldest game in Lambeau Field history. The teams went back and forth, with the Packers capitalizing on a 90-yard touchdown pass in the first half. The Giants leaned on their running attack, outgaining the Packers in rushing yards 114 to 28. Each team had mistakes: the Giants missed two field goals, including a possible game-winner at the end of the fourth quarter that led to overtime. The Packers had three turnovers, with Favre throwing an interception on the second play of overtime. The Giants won the game on a walk-off field goal by Lawrence Tynes four plays after Favre's interception, sending them to Super Bowl XLII, where they would beat the New England Patriots. The NFC Championship Game, which became part of the Giants–Packers rivalry, was notable for its competitiveness, cold weather, and impact on each team. The game helped establish Eli Manning's career, while for Favre, it became the last he would play for the Packers. He was traded during the offseason to the New York Jets, with Aaron Rodgers being named starting quarterback for the Packers.

== Background ==
The New York Giants were coming off of a Wild playoff berth in 2006 with a record of 8–8. The Giants began the season with two consecutive losses, including a 35–13 blowout loss to the Green Bay Packers in Week 2. The Giants then won six straight games going into their bye week to bring their record to 6–2. After their bye week, they split their remaining eight games to finish with a record of 10–6. The Giants were led by a productive rushing attack behind Brandon Jacobs, Derrick Ward, and Reuben Droughns, who combined for almost 2,000 yards and 13 rushing touchdowns. Although the Giants did not win their division, as the Dallas Cowboys went 13–3, their record was good enough to secure the fifth seed and a Wild Card playoff berth. The Giants beat the Tampa Bay Buccaneers in the Wild Card round by a score of 24–8, earning a match-up with the Cowboys. The Giants beat the Cowboys 21–17 in the Divisional round to proceed to the NFC Championship Game.

The Packers missed the playoffs in 2006 with a record of 8–8, after losing out the playoff tiebreaker to the Giants. They finished the 2007 season with a record with of 13–3, the same as the Cowboys, which included two losses to the Chicago Bears. Their other loss was to the Cowboys, which ended up being the tiebreaker for the first seed in the playoffs. They won the NFC North division. With their head-to-head match-up loss, the Packers were given the second seed. Brett Favre, the team's starting quarterback, completed his 18th season with the Packers and finished in the top 10 of most season passing statistics. He was complemented by a defense that gave up the sixth least amount of points during the season. The Packers received a bye week in the Wild Card round before hosting the Seattle Seahawks in the Divisional round. The Packers blew out the Seahawks 42–20 in what became known as the Snow Globe Game. With their higher seeding, the Packers were scheduled to host the Giants at Lambeau Field on January 20, 2008, for the NFC Championship Game. The Green Bay Press-Gazette predicted cold weather for the game, with the wind chill factor bringing the daily low down to −22 °F (−30 °C); the National Weather Service issued a wind chill advisory prior to the start of the game. The Packers were 7.5 point favorites.

== Game summary ==
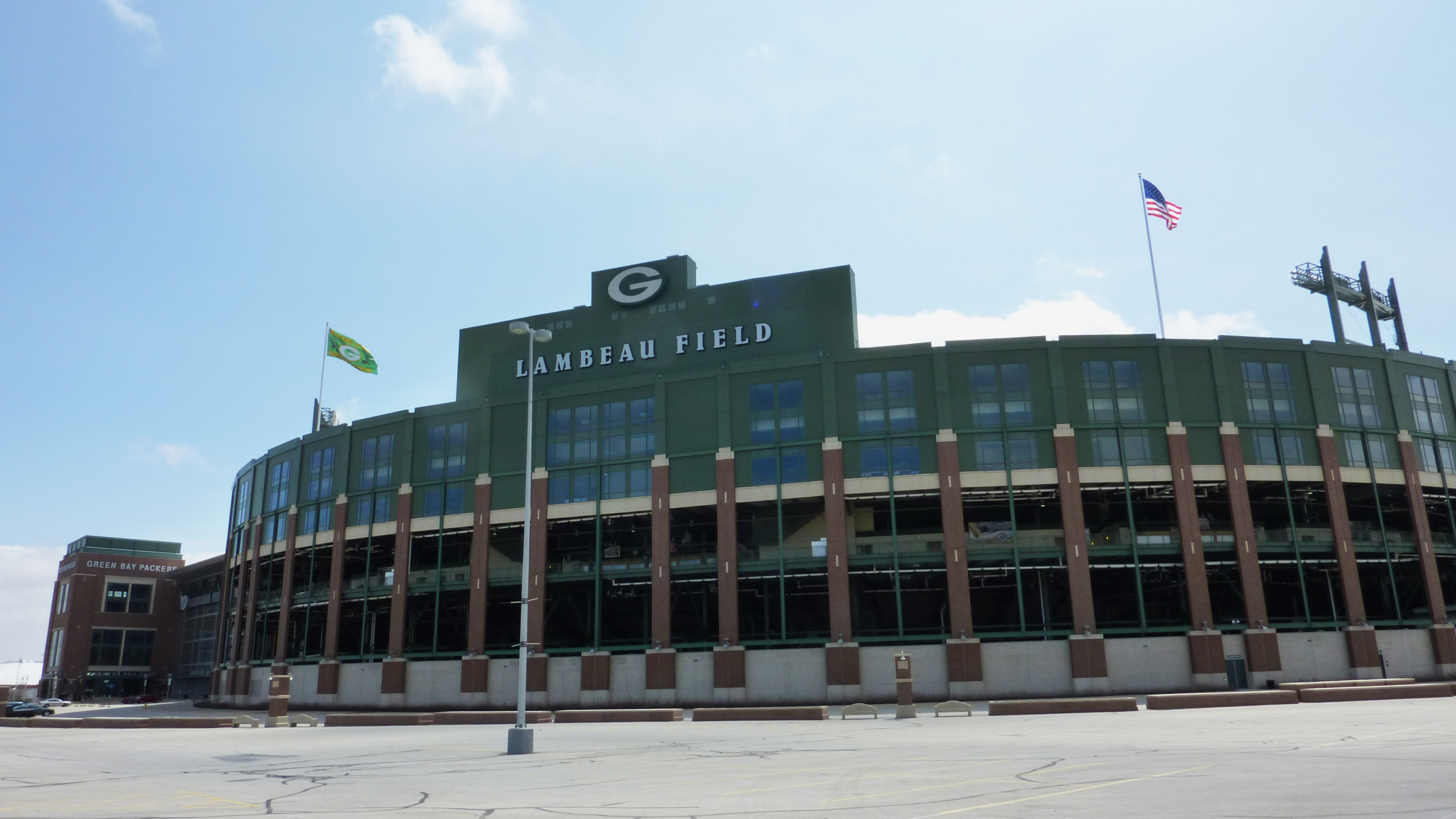
Lambeau Field, shown here in 2011, was the site of the NFC Championship Game.

=== First half ===
The Packers started the game with possession, although they were forced to punt after reaching mid-field. The Giants then proceeded to drive the length of the field, going 71 yards in 14 plays, before the Packers stopped them on the 11-yard line. The Giants attempted a field goal, which was converted by Lawrence Tynes for a 3–0 lead. The next three drives, two by the Packers and one by the Giants, ended in punts. The Giants gained possession at mid-field after the last Packers punt and again drove into field goal range. The Packers again stopped the Giants on third down, forcing another field goal attempt. Tynes made a 37-yard field goal to increase the Giants' lead to 6–0. On the first play of the ensuing drive, Brett Favre completed a 90-yard touchdown pass to Donald Driver, giving the Packers a 7–6 lead. The next three drives ended in punts, with the Packers regaining possession at mid-field. After a short drive, Mason Crosby converted a 36-yard field goal, bringing the score to 10–6. With just over a minute left in the half, the Giants drove 40 yards but a sack on fourth down forced a turnover on downs. The Packers ran one play before halftime.

=== Second half ===
The Giants started the second half with the ball and engineered a 12-play, 68-yard drive that culminated in a one-yard rushing touchdown by Brandon Jacobs; the touchdown gave the Giants the lead again, 13–10. After a long return on the kick-off by Tramon Williams, the Packers started with a short field. The Packers scored six plays later on a 12-yard touchdown pass from Favre to Donald Lee. With the extra point, the Packers took the lead back, 17–13. On the next drive, the Giants started near mid-field and drove for a touchdown, another rushing score, this time by Ahmad Bradshaw, to bring the score to 20–17. The Packers tied the game on the next drive with a 37-yard field goal by Crosby. The Packers had two more drives before the end of the game, both of which ended in three-and-outs. The Giants remaining three possessions ended in a punt and two missed field goals, including a 36-yard attempt as time expired in the fourth quarter.

=== Overtime ===
The Packers won the coin toss before overtime and chose to receive the ball first. On the second play of the drive, after a short rush, Favre threw a pass intended for Driver but was intercepted by Corey Webster. On the ensuing drive, the Giants only gained five yards, setting up a 47-yard field goal attempt. Tynes converted the attempt to give the Giants the victory, 23–20.

=== Box score ===
NFC Championship Game – New York Giants vs Green Bay Packers – Game summary

Quarter	1	2	3	4	OT	Total
Giants	3	3	14	0	3	23
Packers	0	10	7	3	0	20

at Lambeau Field, Green Bay, Wisconsin

- Game time: 6:30 p.m. EST/5:30 p.m. CST
- Game weather: −1 °F (−18 °C), clear
- Game attendance: 72,740
- Referee: Terry McAulay
- TV announcers (Fox): Joe Buck, Troy Aikman, Pam Oliver, and Chris Myers
- Sources: Pro-Football-Reference.com and Green Bay Press-Gazette

Game information

1st Quarter

- NYG – Lawrence Tynes 29-yard field goal, 4:50. Giants 3–0. Drive: 14 plays, 71 yards, 7:48.

2nd Quarter

- NYG – Lawrence Tynes 37-yard field goal, 11:41. Giants 6–0. Drive: 7 plays, 38 yards, 3:04.
- GB – Donald Driver 90-yard pass from Brett Favre (Mason Crosby kick), 11:18. Packers 7–6. Drive: 1 play, 90 yards, 0:23.
- GB – Mason Crosby 36-yard field goal, 1:30. Packers 10–6. Drive: 8 plays, 29 yards, 2:58.

3rd Quarter

- NYG – Brandon Jacobs 1-yard run, 7:56. Giants 13–10. Drive: 12 plays, 69 yards, 7:04.
- GB – Donald Lee 12-yard pass from Brett Favre (Mason Crosby kick), 5:00. Packers 17–13. Drive: 6 plays, 39 yards, 2:56.
- NYG – Ahmad Bradshaw 4-yard run, 2:12. Giants 20–17. Drive: 7 plays, 57 yards, 2:48.

4th Quarter

- GB – Mason Crosby 37-yard field goal, 11:46. Tied 20–20. Drive: 4 plays, 0 yards, 2:14.

Overtime

- NYG – Lawrence Tynes 47-yard field goal, 12:25. Giants 23–20. Drive: 4 plays, 5 yards, 1:39.

New York Giants stats

Passing

- Eli Manning – 21/40, 251 yards

Rushing

- Brandon Jacobs – 21 rushes, 67 yards, 1 touchdown
- Ahmad Bradshaw – 16 rushes, 63 yards, 1 touchdown

Receiving

- Plaxico Burress – 11 receptions, 151 yards
- Amani Toomer – 4 receptions, 42 yards
- Steve Smith – 2 receptions, 25 yards
- Kevin Boss – 1 reception, 12 yards
- Ahmad Bradshaw – 1 reception, 9 yards
- Brandon Jacobs – 1 reception, 8 yards
- David Tyree – 1 reception, 4 yards
Green Bay Packers stats

Passing

- Brett Favre – 19/35, 236 yards, 2 touchdowns, 2 interceptions

Rushing

- Ryan Grant – 13 rushes, 29 yards
- Brett Favre – 1 rush, −1 yards

Receiving

- Donald Driver – 5 receptions, 141 yards, 1 touchdown
- Donald Lee – 3 receptions, 35 yards, 1 touchdown
- Koren Robinson – 4 receptions, 16 yards
- Greg Jennings – 1 receptions, 14 yards
- Korey Hall – 1 reception, 12 yards
- Bubba Franks – 1 reception, 11 yards
- Vernand Morency – 2 reception, 9 yards
- Ryan Grant – 1 reception, 11 yards
- Brandon Jackson – 1 reception, 1 yards

=== Analysis ===
Post-game analysis focused on the competitive nature of the game, the impacts of the weather, individual performances, and the question of Favre's future. The Green Bay Press-Gazette commented that it appeared neither team truly wanted to win, with each giving the other multiple opportunities to secure a victory. However, in the end, with the game going to overtime, being won on a walk-off field goal, the cold weather, and Favre's legacy in the balance, the newspaper noted that it would be a game to remember for many years.

The weather ended up making the game the second coldest in Lambeau Field history up to that point, with temperatures dropping from −1 °F (−18 °C) at kick-off to −3 °F (−19 °C) by the end of the game (the wind chill dropped as low as −24 °F (−31 °C) by the end of the game). The weather was so cold, that Giants' head coach Tom Coughlin's face became bright red during the game, creating a lasting image that represented the challenging conditions that players and personnel faced on the field. Sports commentators noted that the weather conditions also likely impacted the game, including on the late missed field goals by Lawrence Tynes.

Regarding Favre's future, the Packers quarterback had just completed one of his most productive seasons of his career, finishing in second place in MVP voting. However, the team had drafted Aaron Rodgers in 2005 and Favre had been contemplating retirement since at least 2006. Even though his teammates stated their belief he would return, the way the game ended, with Favre throwing an interception (similar to the end of the 4th and 26 playoff game against the Philadelphia Eagles) strengthened the belief that he would not commit to another season and retire. Favre noted after the game that his decision would be made quickly, after talking with the Packers coaches.

Plaxico Burress led the offensive output for the Giants with 11 catches for 151 yards; both figures tied or set playoff records for players against the Packers. Brandon Jacobs and Ahmad Bradshaw combined for a strong running game, gaining 130 yards on the ground and two touchdowns. This contrasted strongly with the Packers run game, with Ryan Grant only gaining 29 yards on 13 rushes for the whole game. The lack of a running game forced the Packers to be one-dimensional and rely on the passing game. The offense then fell apart in the second half, with the Packers having one of their worst playoff halves in history. Sports commentators noted that Favre appeared to be pressing his performance, trying to do too much and force throws to his receivers. His final performance was surprising, considering his past success at Lambeau Field in cold weather games.

Individual plays and players were highlighted during the post-game analysis. Favre's 90-yard touchdown pass to Donald Driver, which was the longest in Packers' playoff history at that time, was identified as a key play of the game, while Favre's interception in overtime was a crucial mistake. Favre noted that the interception came about because he did not throw the ball wide enough, which gave the defense an opportunity to catch the ball. Tynes' multiple misses in the fourth quarter could have been huge momentum swings, however the Packers were unable to capitalize on these mistakes. Tynes was also highlighted for coming through in the end and not letting his earlier misses phase him. Two fumbles also were costly, for different reasons. First, Favre was intercepted in the fourth quarter, although R. W. McQuarters fumbled the ball on the return and the Packers recovered it. Second, on a punt return, the Giants fumbled the ball and Jarrett Bush tried to pick the ball up instead of falling on it and missed, allowing the Domenik Hixon to recover it and retain possession for the Giants. Other than the beginning of the second half, the Packers defense performed well, with Tramon Williams, A. J. Hawk, Atari Bigby all noted for their performance.

== Outcome ==
After their victory, the Giants moved on to Super Bowl XLII, where they faced the New England Patriots. The Patriots, under Tom Brady, had completed a perfect 16–0, the first time an NFL team had a perfect regular season record under a 16-game season. The Patriots also won two playoff games to advance to the Super Bowl, meaning that they were attempting to become the first NFL team to win every regular and postseason game in a season since the 1972 Miami Dolphins. The teams played a competitive game; after the Patriots took the lead late in the game, the Giants drove down the field and scored. Their drive was aided by the famous Helmet Catch, which helped the Giants secure a 17–14 victory and the NFL Championship.

After the season, Favre announced his retirement. Just a few months later, Favre rescinded his retirement and publicly stated his desire to return to the Packers for the 2008 NFL season. The Packers publicly committed to Aaron Rodgers as Favre's successor. After much discussion, Favre agreed to a trade to the New York Jets and Rodgers was reaffirmed as the starter for the Packers in 2008. Rodgers led the Packers to the playoffs in the 2009 season and then won Super Bowl XLV in the 2010 season.

=== Legacy ===
The game has been characterized by multiple sports commentators as one of the greatest championship games in league history. In 2019, the league identified the game as the 54th greatest game from the first 100 years of the history of the NFL. It also became an important part of the Giants–Packers rivalry, which had included five championship games before this one. It has been remembered for its cold weather, with Giants' coach Tom Coughlin's red face becoming an indelible image from the game. The weather also impacted the play on the field and made Tynes' game-winning field goal even more improbable and memorable. With Favre's retirement and then trade to the Jets after the season, the NFC Championship became the last game Favre would play in his career with the Packers and ensured that his last pass as a Packer was an interception. The game was representative of Favre's playoff failures in the 2000s, where he lost six games and threw more interceptions than touchdowns. For Eli Manning, the victory against the Packers and then the Patriots in the Super Bowl helped establish his quarterback credentials.
