= Jesse Whittenton =

American football player (1934–2012)

No. 44, 47
- Position: Defensive back

Personal information
- Born: May 9, 1934; Big Spring, Texas, U.S.
- Died: May 22, 2012 (aged 78); Las Cruces, New Mexico, U.S.
- Listed height: 6 ft 0 in (1.83 m)
- Listed weight: 193 lb (88 kg)

Career information
- High school: Ysleta (El Paso, Texas)
- College: UTEP
- NFL draft: 1956: 5th round, 60th overall pick

Career history
- Los Angeles Rams (1956–1957); Green Bay Packers (1958–1964)

Awards and highlights
- 2× NFL champion (1961, 1962); First-team All-Pro (1961); Second-team All-Pro (1960); 2× Pro Bowl (1961, 1963); Green Bay Packers Hall of Fame

Career NFL statistics
- Interceptions: 24
- Fumble recoveries: 10
- Total touchdowns: 2
- Stats at Pro Football Reference

Urshell James "Jesse" Whittenton (May 9, 1934 – May 21, 2012) was an American professional football player.

== Career ==
Whittenton was a cornerback for nine seasons in the National Football League (NFL), primarily for the Green Bay Packers. He was inducted into the Green Bay Packers Hall of Fame. He played college football for the Texas Western Miners (now UTEP Miners).

Whittenton also played golf on the Senior PGA Tour in the late 1980s. His best finish was T-21 at the 1989 Showdown Classic.

Whittenton is one of at least 345 NFL players to be diagnosed after death with chronic traumatic encephalopathy (CTE), which is caused by repeated hits to the head.
