= Art Rust Jr. =

American sports broadcaster (1927–2010)

- Art Rust Jr. (WABC photo)
- Born: Arthur George Rust Jr. October 13, 1927; Harlem, New York, U.S.
- Died: January 12, 2010 (aged 82)
- Education: Long Island University
- Occupations: Broadcaster, author, and sports historian
- Spouse(s): Edna (d. 1986); Patty
- Children: Suzanne

Arthur George Rust Jr. (October 13, 1927 – January 12, 2010) was a successful sports broadcaster for half a century. He was also a sports historian and author. He was considered by many to have been the godfather of sports talk radio.

== Career ==
=== Broadcaster ===
After he graduated from Long Island University, he was hired by WWRL Radio in Woodside, Queens in September 1954 . He began in their merchandising department, but within two months he got on the air. At WWRL, Rust hosted the Schaefer Circle of Sports for 14 years, becoming one of the first African American sportcasters. At WWRL, Rust interviewed sports icons such as Hank Aaron and Sonny Liston. A music lover, Rust mixed up shows with interviews with artists like James Brown and Miles Davis, who was also a close friend.

In 1967, Rust landed a position as a sports announcer for NBC-TV. After some six years with NBC, Rust decided to return to the radio. He went on to work as sports director for WMCA, and as a sportscaster and commentator for WINS radio.

In 1981, he signed on with WABC for his "Sportstalk" show. He interviewed everyone from Joe DiMaggio to Muhammad Ali, Sugar Ray Robinson and one of his idols, sportscaster Red Barber.

=== Writer ===
Rust had been a columnist for The New York Amsterdam News and the Daily News; he was also an author.

His first book, the controversially titled Get that Nigger off the Field, published in 1976, explores the rocky beginnings of blacks in baseball. Other books include Joe Louis, My Life (1978), a collaboration with the Brown Bomber; Recollections of a Baseball Junkie (1985) in which Rust waxes poetically about his life; Art Rust's Illustrated History of the Black Athlete which celebrates greats such as Jessie Owens and Althea Gibson; and Darryl with Darryl Strawberry (1992).

He collaborated with his wife Edna on several of these books prior to her death in 1986. Devastated by the loss, for years after, Rust delivered a "Goodnight Edna baby," at the end of each "Sportstalk" broadcast. After some time he found a girlfriend in Patty Murphy and remarried in 1991. He was the father of Suzanne Rust, a writer based in New York, and grandfather to her two young children.

== Later career ==
Rust worked with New York's WBLS Radio from 1991 to 1994, but the last few years found him working selectively. He was a contributor for Black Issues Book Review and kept up with the world of sports through books, newspapers and his friends in the business. His favorite pastimes were doting on his two grandchildren and listening to his extensive collection of jazz records.

Rust died on January 12, 2010.

== Selected works ==
- Rust, Art Jr., "Get That Nigger Off the Field!": A Sparkling, Informal History of the Black Man in baseball, 1976
- Rust, Art Jr; Rust, Edna; Louis, Joe, Joe Louis: My Life, 1978
- Rust, Art Jr., Baseball Quiz Book, 1985
- Rust, Art Jr.; Rust, Edna, Art Rust's Illustrated History of the Black athlete, 1985
- Rust, Art Jr.; Rust, Edna, Recollections of a Baseball Junkie, 1985
- Rust, Art Jr., Legends: Conversations with Baseball Greats, 1989
- Rust, Art Jr.; Strawberry, Darryl, Darryl 1992
