= 1961 NFL Championship Game =

Coordinates: 44.501°N 88.062°W

- Program for the 1961 Championship Game
| New York Giants (Eastern) (10–3–1) | Green Bay Packers (Western) (11–3) |
|---|---|
| 0 | 37 |
| Head coach: Allie Sherman | Head coach: Vince Lombardi |
| | 1 | 2 | 3 | 4 | Total |
|---|---|---|---|---|---|
| NYG | 0 | 0 | 0 | 0 | 0 |
| GB | 0 | 24 | 10 | 3 | 37 |
- Date: December 31, 1961
- Stadium: City Stadium; Green Bay, Wisconsin
- MVP: Paul Hornung (Halfback/Kicker; Green Bay)
- Favorite: Green Bay by 3 1/2 points
- Referee: George Rennix
- Attendance: 39,029

TV in the United States
- Network: NBC
- Announcers: Lindsey Nelson; Chris Schenkel

Radio in the United States
- Network: NBC
- Announcers: Ray Scott; Jim Leaming

Location in the United States
Location in Wisconsin

The 1961 NFL Championship Game was the 29th title game of the National Football League. It was played on December 31 at "New" City Stadium, later known as Lambeau Field, in Green Bay, Wisconsin, with an attendance of 39,029.

The contest was touted as "The Million Dollar Game," owing to the $600,000 in television broadcast rights paid to the NFL by NBC combined with a $400,000 gate to be generated through a projected sale of 40,000 tickets at the unitary price of $10 per seat regardless of location in the stadium.

The game was a match-up of the Eastern Conference champion New York Giants (10–3–1) and the Western Conference champion Green Bay Packers (11–3). The home team Packers were a 3 1/3-point favorite. Packers Ray Nitschke, Boyd Dowler, and Paul Hornung were on leave from the U.S. Army. Hornung scored 19 points (a touchdown, three field goals, and four extra points) for the Packers and was named the MVP of the game, and awarded a 1962 Chevrolet Corvette from Sport magazine.

The victory was the first of five NFL titles won in a seven-season span by the Packers and their head coach, Vince Lombardi. It was the Packers' seventh league title and their first in 17 years.

== Overview ==
This was the first NFL championship game held in Green Bay. The Packers' only other championship home game until then was 22 years earlier in 1939, played at the State Fair Park in West Allis outside Milwaukee. Both teams were eager to shed the "runner-up" label. The Giants were in their third championship game in four years, falling in 1958 and 1959 to the Baltimore Colts, and the Packers had lost the title game in 1960 to the Philadelphia Eagles. The Giants' last league title was in 1956 and the Packers in 1944.

Temperature at game time hovered at 20 °F (−7 °C) and for several days the field had been covered with a tarp, topped by a foot (30 cm) of hay. The covering was particularly significant as just two days before, the temperature dipped to −15 °F (−26 °C). Field conditions were of paramount concern if the teams were to make effective use of the running game. All the Packers players used cleats and about half of the Giants players, led by head coach Allie Sherman, chose sneakers, believing they would grip better on a frozen field. At 6 a.m. on game day, workers began the arduous process of snow and hay removal by hand using baskets, as heavy equipment could have potentially damaged the field.

Green Bay had defeated the Giants 20–17 four weeks earlier at County Stadium in Milwaukee to clinch the Western title before a record crowd of 47,012.

Injured in late October, Packer right guard Jerry Kramer was sidelined for the remainder of the season. Forrest Gregg moved in from right tackle to guard, and Norm Masters started at right tackle.

== Game summary ==
=== First quarter ===
After both teams exchanged punts, the Giants were on the move to the Green Bay 46-yard line when the Giants end Kyle Rote, who was wide open but looking back into the sun, dropped a long pass from Y. A. Tittle at the GB 10. When the Packers took over for their 2nd possession, end Max McGee returned the favor by dropping a 50-yard pass from Starr. However, Starr then hit Paul Hornung for a 24-yard gain to midfield. Jim Taylor, despite having injured a kidney in the Rams game two weeks before, and Hornung kept the Packers drive moving to the NY 6-yard line as time expired.

=== Second quarter ===
Capping a 12-play 80-yard drive, Hornung, the NFL's MVP for 1961, slashed outside right tackle for a touchdown on the first play of the 2nd quarter. Hornung's extra-point gave Green Bay a 7–0 lead. The Giants' next two possessions resulted in two Tittle interceptions within two minutes. The first, by Ray Nitschke, led to a Bart Starr to Boyd Dowler slant pass in front of the goal post for a 13-yard touchdown. Both Nitschke and Dowler were on leave from Ft. Lewis in Washington. The second Packer interception, by Hank Gremminger, resulted in a Ron Kramer 14-yard touchdown from Starr. Charley Conerly then replaced Tittle at quarterback and most of the Giants had switched to cleats by this time. Conerly hit Kyle Rote with a 35-yard pass to the Green Bay 15, but Bob Gaiters overthrew Rote (who was wide open) in the end zone on a 4th down halfback option pass. With time in the half running down, Hornung gained 24 yards on two carries, then tight end Ron Kramer caught a pass from Starr for 38 yards. Hornung followed with a 17-yard field goal as time ran out, to make the score 24–0 at halftime.

=== Third quarter ===
In an unusual turn of events, the Packers were given five downs on their first possession of the quarter. On first down, Hornung ran up the middle. Then, on second down, Bart Starr scrambled for fifteen yards and fumbled the ball away. But the Packers were flagged for an illegal procedure penalty. After the Giants refused the penalty, the officials at first gave the ball to the Giants. But realizing a procedure penalty negates any resulting play, the officials correctly gave the ball back to Green Bay, albeit with a first down instead of second down. Despite the extra play, Green Bay eventually punted. The following series also resulted in a GB punt, with the Giants Joe Morrison fumbling and Forrest Gregg recovering for the Packers. Hornung then booted a 22-yard field goal, making it 27–0.

The Packers continued their march toward a championship with hard running by Hornung and Tom Moore (replacing Taylor). Starr completed his third touchdown pass, this one to Ron Kramer in the left corner of the end zone. Kramer fell heavily on the ice after scoring and limped off the field. The Giants went back to Tittle at quarterback again as the quarter ended.

=== Fourth quarter ===
The veteran Tittle, who led the Giants to two more championship appearances in 1962 and 1963, could do no better than Conerly, throwing an interception to the Packers Jesse Whittenton. Jim Taylor, back in the game, promptly rumbled outside the right tackle on a 33-yard run to the Giants' 13. Hornung ended the scoring with a 19-yard field goal. A fourth Tittle interception had the Packers knocking on the goal line again as the gun sounded to end the game. The 19 points that Paul Hornung scored was at the time the most ever in a championship game. One year earlier, in a 12-game season, Hornung scored an incredible 176 points, which remained a record - even though the season had been increased to 16 games - until 2006.

=== Scoring summary ===
Green Bay Packers 37, New York Giants 0

| Quarter | 1 | 2 | 3 | 4 | Total |
|---|---|---|---|---|---|
| Giants | 0 | 0 | 0 | 0 | 0 |
| Packers | 0 | 24 | 10 | 3 | 37 |

- Date: December 31, 1961
- Game time: 1 p.m. CST
- Game weather: 17 °F (−8 °C), wind 10 mph (16 km/h), wind chill 6 °F (−14 °C), relative humidity 82%
- TV announcers (NBC): Lindsey Nelson & Chris Schenkel
- Pro-Football-Reference

Game information

- First quarter
  - no scoring
- Second quarter
  - GB – Paul Hornung 6-yard run (Hornung kick). Packers 7–0
  - GB – Boyd Dowler 13-yard pass from Bart Starr (Hornung kick). Packers 14–0
  - GB – Ron Kramer 14-yard pass from Starr (Hornung kick). Packers 21–0
  - GB – Paul Hornung 17-yard field goal. Packers 24–0
- Third quarter
  - GB – Paul Hornung 22-yard field goal. Packers 27–0
  - GB – Ron Kramer 13-yard pass from Starr (Hornung kick). Packers 34–0
- Fourth quarter
  - GB – Paul Hornung 19-yard field goal. Packers 37–0

Top passers

- NY – Y. A. Tittle – 6/20, 65 yards, 4 INT
- GB – Bart Starr – 10/17, 164 yards, 3 TD

Top rushers

- NY – Alex Webster – 7 rushes, 19 yards
- GB – Paul Hornung – 20 rushes, 89 yards, 1 TD

Top receivers

- NY – Kyle Rote – 3 receptions, 54 yards
- GB – Ron Kramer – 4 receptions, 80 yards, 2 TD

== Officials ==
- Referee: George Rennix (#52)
- Umpire: James Beiersdorfer (#17)
- Head linesman: John Highberger (#48)
- Back judge: Charles Sweeney (#22)
- Field judge: Frank Luzar (#14)

The NFL had five game officials in 1961; the line judge was added in 1965 and the side judge in 1978.

== Players' shares ==
With 40,000 tickets sold at $10 each and $615,000 in TV revenue, this game was the first NFL Championship to generate $1 million in revenue. Each player on the winning Packers team received $5,195, while Giants players made $3,340 each.

== Vince Lombardi ==
This was the fifth shutout in NFL Championship game history and coach Lombardi's first of five championships in seven years. Lombardi used a strategy in this game that was common in all the Packers championships. A strategy of fundamentally sound football (the Packers had no turnovers and only 16 yards in penalties) and to beat the opposition at their strength, in this case running the ball at the Giants linemen Andy Robustelli and Rosey Grier. This strategy allowed the Packers to control the game, running 63 offensive plays to only 43 for the Giants. In 1959, Lombardi (who formerly happened to be the offensive coordinator for the New York Giants) had taken over a Green Bay franchise that was the worst team in the league in 1958, and in three years turned them into NFL Champions.

== See also ==
- Giants–Packers rivalry
- 1961 NFL season
- History of the NFL championship
- 1961 American Football League Championship Game

== Video ==
- "1961 NFL Championship Broadcast – New York Giants at Green Bay Packers," NBC via YouTube.com (Full game.)
- "1961 NFL Championship Broadcast – New York Giants at Green Bay Packers," NBC via YouTube.com (Extended version, lower quality.)
