= Corey Webster =

American football player (born 1982)

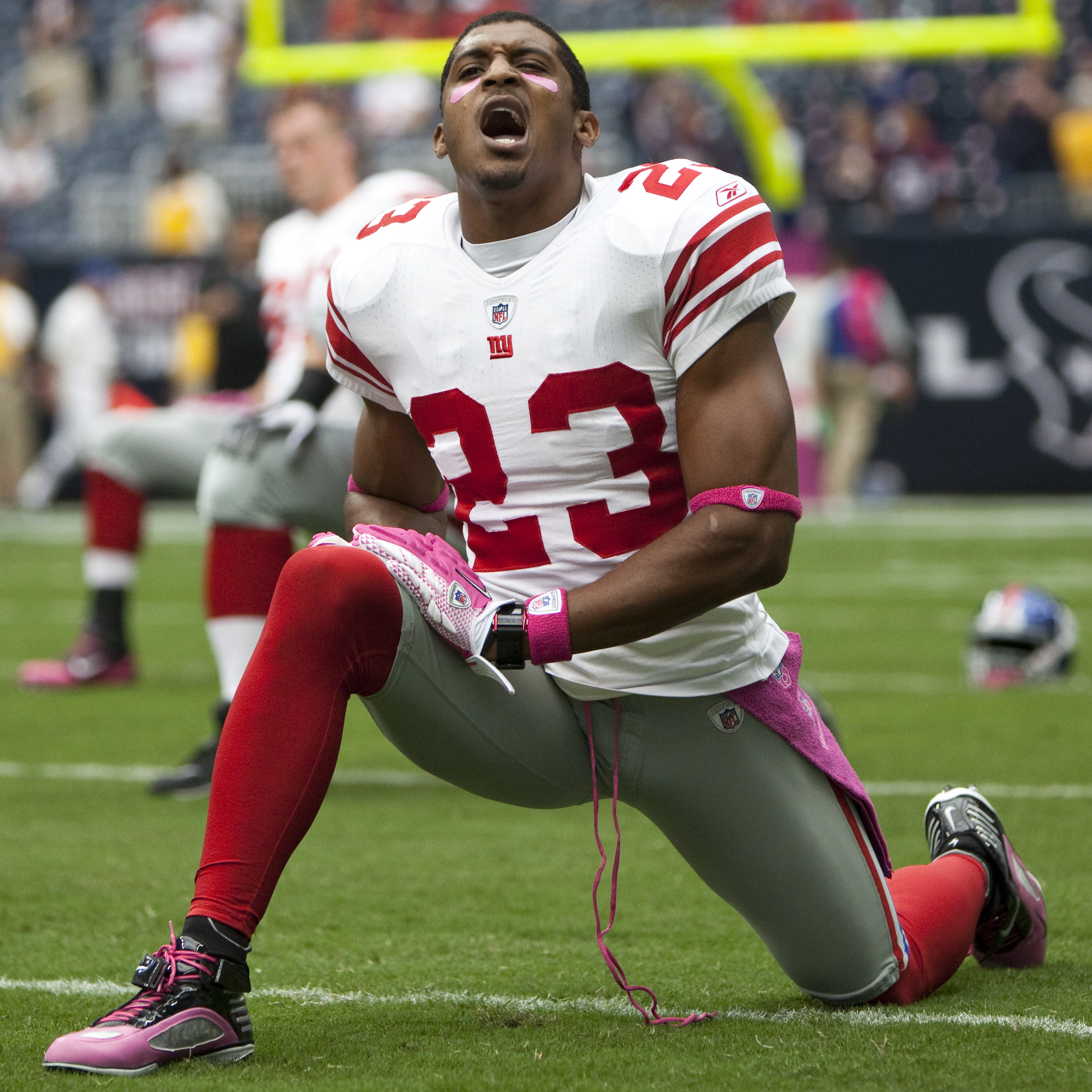
- Webster with the New York Giants in 2010

No. 23
- Position: Cornerback

Personal information
- Born: March 2, 1982 (age 44); Vacherie, Louisiana, U.S.
- Listed height: 6 ft 0 in (1.83 m)
- Listed weight: 200 lb (91 kg)

Career information
- High school: St. James (Vacherie)
- College: LSU (2001–2004)
- NFL draft: 2005: 2nd round, 43rd overall pick

Career history
- New York Giants (2005–2013)

Awards and highlights
- 2× Super Bowl champion (XLII, XLVI); 87th greatest New York Giant of all-time; BCS national champion (2003); 2× First-team All-American (2003, 2004); 3× First-team All-SEC (2002, 2003, 2004)

Career NFL statistics
- Total tackles: 375
- Sacks: 2
- Forced fumbles: 7
- Fumble recoveries: 3
- Interceptions: 20
- Defensive touchdowns: 1
- Stats at Pro Football Reference

Corey Jonas Webster (born March 2, 1982) is an American former professional football player who was a cornerback in the National Football League (NFL) for 9 seasons, all with the New York Giants. He played college football for the LSU Tigers. Webster was selected by the Giants in the second round of the 2005 NFL draft and later won two Super Bowls with the team, both over the New England Patriots.

== Early life ==
Webster attended St. James High School in Vacherie, Louisiana, and was a two-sport star in both football and basketball. He was an all-state quarterback wearing jersey #1 for the Wildcats football team and an all-state guard wearing jersey #11 for the basketball team. He was recruited as a wide receiver coming out of high school but was later asked to play cornerback at LSU by then coach Nick Saban.

== College career ==
After catching 7 passes for 74 yards as a true freshman, Webster converted to Cornerback for the 2002 season. He would end his college career with 16 interceptions (2nd in school history), be named as a 1st Team All-American twice, and was a 1st Team All-SEC selection 3 times. As a junior in 2003, he finished second in the SEC with 25 pass breakups and had 17 as a sophomore in 2002.

== Professional career ==
Pre-draft measurables
Height	Weight	Arm length	Hand span	40-yard dash	20-yard shuttle	Three-cone drill	Vertical jump	Broad jump	Bench press
6 ft 0 1/8 in (1.83 m)	199 lb (90 kg)	31 1/2 in (0.80 m)	9 1/8 in (0.23 m)	4.50 s	4.01 s	6.91 s	39.0 in (0.99 m)	10 ft 4 in (3.15 m)	13 reps
All values from NFL Combine/Pro Day

=== 2007 ===
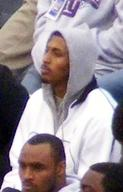
Webster at the New York Giants Super Bowl rally at Giants Stadium

In 2007, Webster was limited to special teams duty or even inactive after starting the first few weeks after what was seen as a widely poor performance in the Giants opening weeks of the season. Later on in the season, he had a good game against the Buffalo Bills in week 16, which was a precursor to his playoff success. He had an interception and a touchdown against the Bills. In the Wild Card Playoff game against the Tampa Bay Buccaneers, he intercepted Jeff Garcia in the end zone. He also recovered a fumble by Buccaneers returner Micheal Spurlock at the beginning of the second half. This turnover set up a Giant field goal. In the NFC divisional Playoff game, he came up with near shutdown defense on All-Pro Terrell Owens. He also made what turned out to be the game-winning interception against the Green Bay Packers in the 2007 NFC Championship Game, sending the Giants to Super Bowl XLII. This turned out to be Brett Favre's last pass as a Packer.

=== 2008 ===
In Super Bowl XLII, Webster provided a huge performance through the first three quarters. However, on the go-ahead Patriots scoring drive, he fell down, which allowed New England Patriots receiver Randy Moss to score an easy touchdown on a key third down play, putting the Patriots up 14–10 with less than three minutes to go in the game. But, he came back to deflect a pass from Tom Brady to Randy Moss on the next drive to prevent the Patriots from scoring, and all but securing the Super Bowl victory.

On December 14, 2008, the New York Giants gave him a 5-year $43.5 million deal with $20 million guaranteed.

=== 2009 ===
During the Giants opening home game against the Redskins on September 13, 2009, Webster was involved in an altercation with Washington Redskins wide receiver Santana Moss. Both players were penalized for Unsportsmanlike Conduct.

=== 2011 ===
Webster had a career-high six interceptions during the 2011 regular season. Webster helped the Giants beat the Patriots for the second time in five years in Super Bowl XLVI by a score of 21–17. He defended 1 pass and recorded a tackle.

=== 2012 ===
Webster had a career-high 58 tackles (52 solo) during the 2012 regular season.

=== 2013 ===
Webster suffered a hip flexor and was questionable for the September 22, 2013, game against the Carolina Panthers.

On December 27, 2023, over a decade after his last NFL snap, Webster announced that he would sign a one-day contract to retire as a Giant.

== Statistics ==
		Tackles						Interceptions					Fumbles	
Year	Team	G	GS	Total	Solo	Sck	Sfty	Int	Yds	Avg	Lng	TD	FF	FR
2005	NYG	15	2	37	36	0	0	-	-	-	-	-	2	0
2006	NYG	12	10	41	37	1.0	0	1	0	0.0	0	0	2	1
2007	NYG	14	3	18	17	0	0	1	34	34.0	34T	1	0	0
2008	NYG	16	16	50	48	1.0	0	3	65	21.7	57	0	2	1
2009	NYG	13	13	51	44	0.0	0	1	0	0.0	0	0	0	0
2010	NYG	15	15	52	45	0.0	0	4	11	2.8	13	0	0	0
2011	NYG	16	16	51	43	0.0	0	6	71	11.8	25	0	0	0
2012	NYG	16	16	58	52	0.0	0	4	45	11.2	38	0	0	0
2013	NYG	4	2	13	8	0.0	0	0	0	0.0	0	0	0	0
Total		121	93	371	330	2.0	0	20	226	11.3	57	1	6	2
