= Lawrence Tynes =

Scottish gridiron football player (born 1978)

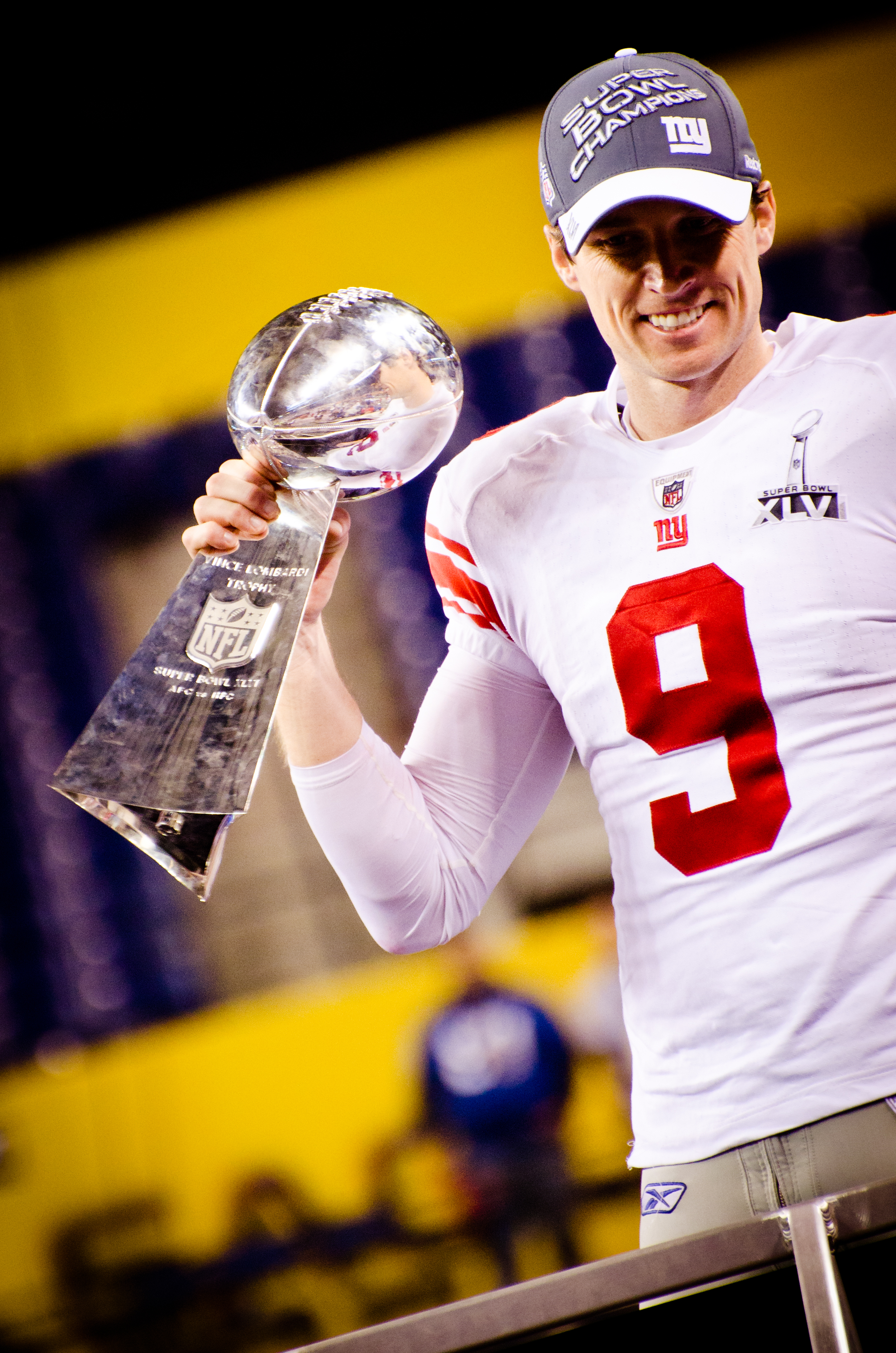
- Tynes hoisting the Lombardi Trophy with the New York Giants in 2012

No. 1, 9
- Position: Placekicker

Personal information
- Born: 3 May 1978 (age 48); Greenock, Scotland
- Listed height: 6 ft 1 in (1.85 m)
- Listed weight: 194 lb (88 kg)

Career information
- High school: Milton (Milton, Florida, U.S.)
- College: Troy (1997–2000)
- NFL draft: 2001: undrafted

Career history
- Kansas City Chiefs (2001–2002)*; Scottish Claymores (2002); Ottawa Renegades (2002–2003); Kansas City Chiefs (2004–2006); New York Giants (2007–2012); Tampa Bay Buccaneers (2013)
- * Offseason or practice squad member only

Awards and highlights
- 2× Super Bowl champion (XLII, XLVI); 91st greatest New York Giant of all-time; All-CFL team (2003); First-team All-American (2000); First-team All-Southland Conference (2000); Second-team All-Southland Conference (1999)

Career NFL statistics
- Field goals made: 190
- Field goals attempted: 233
- Field goal %: 81.5%
- Longest field goal: 53
- Stats at Pro Football Reference

Lawrence Tynes (born 3 May 1978) is a Scottish former professional American football placekicker. He played college football at Troy and was signed by the Kansas City Chiefs as an undrafted free agent in 2001. He spent two seasons on the practice squad in Kansas City, then played in NFL Europe and in the Canadian Football League (CFL). He came back to Kansas City and played for the Chiefs for three seasons, and was then traded to the Giants in 2007. In his first season with the Giants, he kicked the game-winning field goal in overtime against the Green Bay Packers in the 2007–08 NFC Championship Game, which qualified the Giants for Super Bowl XLII. Four years later, he kicked another overtime field goal against the San Francisco 49ers in the 2011–12 NFC Championship Game, which qualified the Giants for Super Bowl XLVI. He experienced his best success with the Giants, winning Super Bowl championships in 2007 and 2011, defeating the New England Patriots in both games.

Tynes is the only player in NFL history to have two overtime game-winning field goals in the playoffs. Tynes kicked the longest post-season field goal in Lambeau Field post-season history (47 yards) in the 2007 NFC Championship Game. Tynes sent the New York Giants to the Super Bowl a second time by kicking a 31-yard FG in overtime in the NFC Championship game to advance to Super Bowl XLVI in 2011.

== Early life ==
Tynes was born on 3 May 1978 in Greenock, Scotland. He is the son of a former attached support US Navy serviceman to NSWU-2 and a Scottish mother. The family lived in Campbeltown until he was 10 years old, before moving to the United States. His father, Larry, a US Navy retiree was a supportive US Navy member of SEAL Team 2, stationed in Scotland in the mid-1980s. Larry is a retired major crimes detective of the Santa Rosa County, Florida, Sheriff's Department in Milton, Florida. One of Lawrence Tynes's brothers, Jason, served in the United States Army in Iraq and Kuwait.

After he played soccer for Milton High School, a coach suggested he try out for the football team as a kicker.

== College career ==
Tynes played college football for Troy University from 1997 to 2000.

== Professional career ==
=== Kansas City Chiefs (2001–2002) ===
Signed as an undrafted free agent, Tynes spent the first two seasons with the Chiefs but only on their practice squad.

=== Scottish Claymores (2002) ===
The Kansas City Chiefs allocated Tynes to NFL Europe in the Spring of 2002. Tynes spent the spring season with the Scottish Claymores of NFL Europe during 2002. Tynes made 9-12 FG's handling all FG's outside of 40 yards.

=== Ottawa Renegades (2002–2003) ===
After his departure from the Claymores, Tynes signed for the Renegades organization in the Canadian Football League.Tynes was named 1st Team All-Pro in the CFL for the 2003 season after leading the CFL in field goals made and scoring. 2003: 51-62 FG's, long of 59, 198pts.

=== Second stint with the Kansas City Chiefs (2004–2006) ===
Tynes re-signed for the Chiefs and was ready to be the next full-time kicker for the team. During the 2004 season, he converted 17 field goals out of 23 opportunities. In 2005, he made 27 field goals out of 33 opportunities. In 2006, he made 24 field goals out of 31 opportunities.

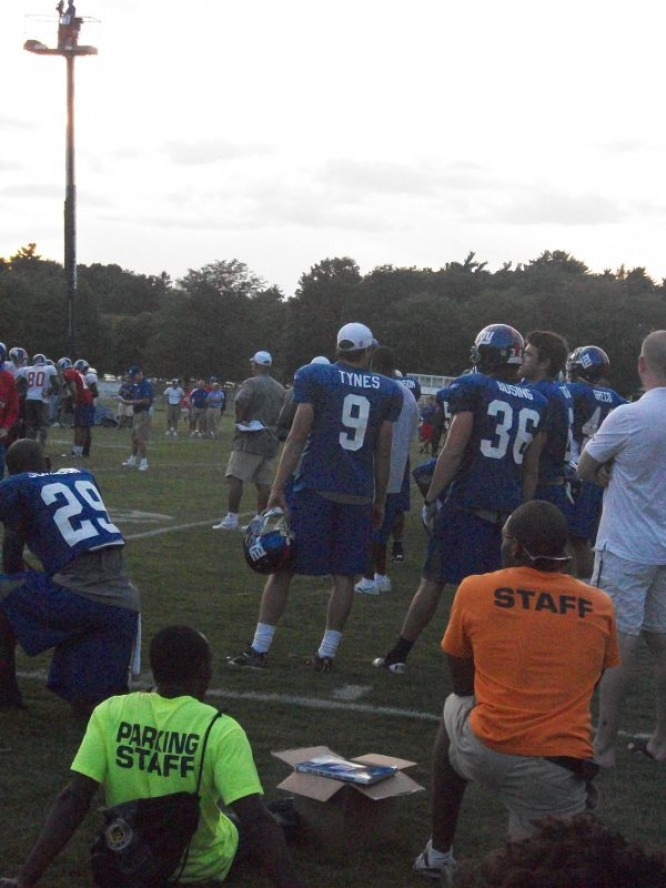
Tynes at Giants Training Camp

=== New York Giants (2007–2012) ===
==== 2007 ====
Tynes was traded from Kansas City on 5/22/2007 to the New York Giants for a 2008 7th Round Draft Pick. Tynes's first year with the New York Giants saw him make 23 out of 27 attempts overall. During the 2007 NFC Championship Game in Green Bay against the Packers, played in sub-zero Fahrenheit temperatures, Tynes hit his first two field goal attempts, then missed two field goal attempts in the fourth quarter, the latter after a bad snap. In overtime he made the game-winning 47-yard field goal to win the game for the Giants, 23–20, as the team moved on to play in the Super Bowl with the win. Tynes earned his first career championship ring as the Giants defeated the New England Patriots in Super Bowl XLII, ruining what would have been an unprecedented 19–0 season for the Patriots.

==== 2008 ====
Tynes was limited to only two games during the 2008 season due to a torn meniscus that was bothering him since training camp. He still made one field goal before undergoing season-ending knee surgery. During his absence, John Carney replaced him as the kicker.

==== 2009 ====
During the 2009 season, Tynes converted 27 field goals out of 32 opportunities.

==== 2010 ====
Playing 15 games of the 2010 regular season, Tynes made 19 field goals out of 23 opportunities.

==== 2011 ====
In 2011, Tynes converted 19 field goals out of 24 opportunities. During the NFC Championship game against the San Francisco 49ers, Tynes kicked another walk-off field goal in overtime to win the game, 20–17. Tynes got his second championship title as the Giants won Super Bowl XLVI against the Patriots. In the game, he converted one extra point and two field goals (a 38-yarder and a 33-yarder, both in the third quarter).

==== 2012 ====
In the 2012 season, Tynes made a career-high 33 field goals out of 39 opportunities.

=== Tampa Bay Buccaneers (2013) ===
On 17 July 2013, the Buccaneers signed Tynes to a one-year contract worth $905,000 after Connor Barth suffered a season-ending torn Achilles tendon. He contracted MRSA (methicillin-resistant Staphylococcus aureus) in August 2013, after his toe failed to heal from surgery to remove an ingrown toenail. After spending the entire season on injured reserve, Tynes was released on 11 March 2014, and the infection effectively ended his NFL career. Tynes sued the Buccaneers in 2015 for $20 million, claiming that unsanitary conditions led to his MRSA infection. Other teammates, including Carl Nicks and Johnthan Banks, also contracted MRSA around the same time while with the Buccaneers, and while Nicks also found his career at an end, Banks went on to play several more seasons in the NFL. Tynes and the Buccaneers agreed to a confidential settlement in 2017.

=== Tynes Officially Retires from the NFL (2014) ===
Tynes was unable to continue his playing career after multiple surgeries on his kicking foot associated with the MRSA infection.

== Personal life ==
Tynes is married to Amanda, and the couple have twin sons. Tynes is the seventh Scottish-born player in NFL history.

His other brother, Mark, is serving 27 years in federal prison on drug and witness intimidation charges stemming from his 2004 involvement in a plan to move 3,600 pounds (1,600 kg) of marijuana between Texas and Florida. Tynes has sought a presidential pardon to shorten or commute his brother's sentence. He has acknowledged his brother's guilt but feels the sentence was too harsh. However, in the proceedings, Mark was reportedly belligerent and uncooperative. The judge who presided at the case had parameters in which to sentence Mark and, because of his foul and unruly behaviour, gave Mark the maximum sentence.

Tynes enjoys soccer and supports Celtic Football Club.

=== Legal trouble ===
On 17 August 2005, Tynes turned himself in to Pierce County, Wisconsin, jail after punching a bar patron and breaking a bouncer's nose in a bar fight the previous weekend (the Chiefs' training camp at the time was based out of River Falls). Tynes was charged with one felony count of substantial battery and one count of misdemeanor battery. He was released on a $15,000 signature bond. Tynes paid a $397 fine for the incident.
