= Norm Masters =

American gridiron football player (1933–2011)

No. 67, 78
- Position: Offensive tackle

Personal information
- Born: September 19, 1933; Detroit, Michigan, U.S.
- Died: April 19, 2011 (aged 77); Bloomfield Hills, Michigan, U.S.
- Listed height: 6 ft 2 in (1.88 m)
- Listed weight: 249 lb (113 kg)

Career information
- High school: St. Mary of Redford (Detroit)
- College: Michigan State (1952–1955)
- NFL draft: 1956: 2nd round, 18th overall pick

Career history
- BC Lions (1956); Detroit Lions (1957)*; Green Bay Packers (1957–1964)
- * Offseason or practice squad member only

Awards and highlights
- 2× NFL champion (1961, 1962); Consensus All-American (1955); First-team All-Big Ten (1955)

Career NFL statistics
- Games played: 104
- Games started: 60
- Fumble recoveries: 4
- Stats at Pro Football Reference

Norman Donald Masters (September 19, 1933 – April 19, 2011) was an American professional football offensive tackle for the Green Bay Packers.

Born and raised in Detroit, Michigan, Masters graduated from its St. Mary of Redford High School, and played college football at Michigan State. There he earned consensus All-American honors as a senior on the Spartans' 1955 squad that finished 9–1 with a Rose Bowl win over UCLA.

The Chicago Cardinals selected Masters in the second round of the 1956 NFL draft. He instead accepted an offer from the B.C. Lions of the CFL and played the 1956 season in Canada. His hometown Detroit Lions acquired his rights for the 1957 season. The Lions traded Masters to the Green Bay Packers in a six-player deal which included three linemen (Masters, tackle Ollie Spencer and guard Jim Salsbury) and halfback Don McIlhenny to the Packers for quarterback Tobin Rote and defensive back Val Joe Walker.

Masters was 6 feet 2 inches tall and weighed 249 pounds

Masters started at right tackle for the Packers in the 1961 NFL Championship Game, a 37–0 victory at home; it was the first of five NFL titles for head coach Vince Lombardi.
