= 2007 New England Patriots season =

48th season in franchise history; first 16–0 record in NFL history

- Owner: Robert Kraft
- Head coach: Bill Belichick
- Offensive coordinator: Josh McDaniels
- Defensive coordinator: Dean Pees
- Home stadium: Gillette Stadium

Results
- Record: 16–0
- Division place: 1st AFC East
- Playoffs: Won Divisional Playoffs (vs. Jaguars) 31–20; Won AFC Championship (vs. Chargers) 21–12; Lost Super Bowl XLII (vs. Giants) 14–17
- All-Pros: 9: QB Tom Brady (1st team); WR Randy Moss (1st team); T Matt Light (1st team); OLB Mike Vrabel (1st team); CB Asante Samuel (1st team); WR Wes Welker (2nd team); G Logan Mankins (2nd team); C Dan Koppen (2nd team); DT Vince Wilfork (2nd team)
- Pro Bowlers: 8: QB Tom Brady; WR Randy Moss; T Matt Light; G Logan Mankins; C Dan Koppen; DT Vince Wilfork; OLB Mike Vrabel; CB Asante Samuel

Uniform

The 2007 season was the New England Patriots' 38th in the National Football League (NFL), their 48th overall and their eighth under head coach Bill Belichick. Starting quarterback Tom Brady won his first NFL MVP award, throwing a then-record 50 passing touchdowns. Newly acquired All-Pro wide receiver Randy Moss joined the Patriots in a trade, after a lackluster stint with the Oakland Raiders, and caught an NFL-record 23 receiving touchdowns. The 2007 Patriots are widely considered one of the greatest NFL teams of all time.

The Patriots improved on their 12–4 record from 2006 and won the AFC East for the sixth time in seven years by winning all 16 of their games. They became the eighth team in NFL history to finish a regular season undefeated, the first to do so since the 1972 Miami Dolphins, and the fourth to finish undefeated and untied. The Patriots were also the first team with a perfect regular season since the NFL expanded its schedule to sixteen games in 1978, and when the NFL expanded to a seventeen game schedule in 2021, they became the only NFL team ever to complete a 16-game season undefeated. Thus, they broke the record for victories in a single regular season that had been shared by the 1984 San Francisco 49ers, the 1985 Chicago Bears, the 1998 Minnesota Vikings, and the 2004 Pittsburgh Steelers, who each finished with a record of 15–1. The 1984 49ers and 1985 Bears would win Super Bowl XIX and Super Bowl XX respectively, and the 1998 Vikings and 2004 Steelers would lose their conference championship games. The 2007 Patriots are the only team in NFL history to complete a 16-game regular season undefeated because the NFL switched to a 17-game schedule in 2021. (Note: Since the adoption of the 17-game schedule, no team has won more than fifteen regular season games, a feat achieved by the Kansas City Chiefs and Detroit Lions in 2024.) As of today, they are also the most recent NFL team to complete a regular season undefeated. The 2007 Patriots compiled a point differential of +315, the highest in NFL history.

The focal part in the Patriots’ success this season was their offense, setting numerous records. They set the record for most points scored in a season at the time at 589, (Note: Later broken by the 2013 Denver Broncos) and lead the league in passing yards and total touchdowns at 4,859 and 75 respectively. The 2007 Patriots are also one of the five teams in NFL history to score 30 or more points in 12 or more games in a single season, (Note: The other five teams are the 1999 St. Louis Rams and 2011 New England Patriots, plus the 2013 Denver Broncos, and the 2018 Kansas City Chiefs) and scored 40 or more points 4 times, which included a season high 56 points scored against the Buffalo Bills in week 11.

The Patriots entered the playoffs as the heavy favorites to win Super Bowl XLII. They defeated the Jacksonville Jaguars 31-20 in the Divisional Round, and the San Diego Chargers 21-12 in the AFC Championship Game to make it to the Super Bowl and improve their record to 18-0 (regular season and postseason combined). However, they failed to complete their perfect season as they were upset by the Eli Manning-led New York Giants by a final score of 17-14, ending their hopes of becoming the first undefeated and untied team in NFL history to win the Super Bowl since their division rival Miami Dolphins did it in 1972, and the first to do it under a 16-game format.

Despite this loss, the 2007 Patriots are still regarded as one of the best teams in NFL history, with NFL Films ranking them as the 7th-greatest team of all time in 2019.

== Season summary ==
The Patriots entered the offseason following a stunning loss to the rival Indianapolis Colts in the AFC Championship after blowing a 21–3 first half lead. After having lost their two starting wide receivers in the previous offseason, the Patriots added Donté Stallworth in free agency and traded for Wes Welker from the Miami Dolphins and Randy Moss from the Oakland Raiders in the spring. Welker would tie for the NFL lead in receptions with T. J. Houshmandzadeh in 2007 while Moss would set an NFL regular season record with 23 touchdown catches (part of his 98 receptions). The season began with controversy, when Patriot head coach Bill Belichick and the Patriots organization were penalized by the NFL for their involvement in the videotaping of opponents’ defensive signals from an unauthorized location in their Week 1 game against the New York Jets. This came to be referred to in the media as "Spygate". Early in the season, the Patriots won their first two games by identical scores of 38–14, and followed up the next game with a score of 38–7. Despite the media scrutiny, the Patriots continued to gain momentum, winning mid-season games by scores such as 49–28, 52–7, and 56–10, as quarterback Tom Brady emphasized the team's desire to blow out and “kill teams." The Patriots set the record for most points in a season with 589, shattering the previous record by 33 points. The Patriots won 12 games in which they surpassed the 30-point mark, four games in which they surpassed the 40-point mark and two in which they surpassed the 50-point mark.

The Patriots clinched the AFC East after their eleventh game (in Week 12), the fourth time since the NFL introduced the 16-game schedule in 1978 that a team had clinched a division title by their eleventh game. (Note: The other teams to achieve this were the 1985 Chicago Bears, the 1997 San Francisco 49ers and the 2004 Philadelphia Eagles.) In the regular season finale, facing the New York Giants, the Patriots sought to finish the regular season with the first 16–0 record in NFL history, and did so successfully. In that game, Brady and Moss connected on two touchdown passes, with Moss setting his single-season 23 touchdown reception record, breaking Pro Football Hall of Fame member Jerry Rice's 22 touchdown receptions and with Brady setting an NFL record with 50 touchdown passes on the season. It was the first undefeated regular season in the NFL since the 1972 Miami Dolphins finished 14–0. Brady earned his first NFL MVP award, while the Patriots’ offense destroyed numerous NFL records, including those for touchdowns (75), points scored (589) and point differential (+315)

With the #1 seed in the AFC playoffs, the Patriots first defeated the Jacksonville Jaguars, 31–20, then the San Diego Chargers 21–12, to advance to Super Bowl XLII, their sixth in franchise history. According to the Elias Sports Bureau, with this accomplishment, they became the first professional sports team since 1884 in any of the four major American sports (football, basketball, baseball, hockey) to win the first 18 games of their season. Facing the prospect of a perfect 19–0 season with a victory over the underdog New York Giants, whom they had already defeated in the regular season finale, analysts saw the 2007 Patriots as being the greatest team in NFL history.

Despite being the overwhelming favorites to win the game, the Patriots failed to protect a four-point lead on a Giants drive late in the fourth quarter. A dramatic pass from a scrambling Eli Manning combined with an acrobatic catch by wide receiver David Tyree put the Giants deep in Patriots territory, and a Manning touchdown pass to Plaxico Burress gave the Giants a lead with just 35 seconds left. The Patriots could not score again and came out on the losing end of what is considered one of the greatest upsets in sports history. The Patriots ended the season at 18–1, becoming one of only three teams in NFL history to finish their season (including postseason) 18–1. The NFL Network named the 2007 Patriots the #1 team on their list of “Top 10 Teams That Didn't Win A Super Bowl.”

== Offseason ==
=== Death of Marquise Hill ===
On the evening of May 27, 2007, 24-year-old defensive end Marquise Hill and his friend, Ashley Blazio, fell off a jet ski in Lake Pontchartrain, north of New Orleans. Neither of them wore personal flotation or tracking devices. According to Hill's agent, who spoke with Blazio, Hill "ended up saving her life, keeping her calm until she could grab onto a buoy." Blazio was rescued and sent to Tulane Medical Center. Coast Guard units searched the area. Hill's body was found by the Louisiana Department of Wildlife and Fisheries around 2:15 PM CDT on May 28.

Hill's funeral, paid for by the team, was attended by many members of the Patriots team and staff, as well as by Hill's former coach Nick Saban.

For the 2007 season, all members of the Patriots wore a black No. 91 decal on the backs of their helmets. A friend of Hill's since high school, fellow Patriots defensive lineman Jarvis Green supported Hill's fiancée Inell Benn and son Ma’Shy financially following Hill's death. Green also wore Hill's old shoulder pads for the Patriots’ October 14 game against the Cowboys, which Benn attended.

=== Staff changes ===
Unlike previous offseasons, head coach Bill Belichick’s 2007 coaching staff remained generally unchanged. Wide receivers coach Brian Daboll left to become the quarterbacks coach for the New York Jets and was replaced by Director of Pro Personnel Nick Caserio. Former Duke University offensive coordinator and quarterbacks coach Bill O'Brien was also hired as an offensive assistant. A former special teams contributor for the Patriots, linebacker Don Davis retired and joined the coaching staff as an assistant strength and conditioning coach. Offensive coaching assistant Mike Judge also joined Harvard University as a wide receivers coach.

=== Departures ===
Free agency saw the departure of two 2006 starters for the Patriots: tight end Daniel Graham signed with the Denver Broncos, and linebacker Tully Banta-Cain signed with the San Francisco 49ers, while running back Corey Dillon, the Patriots’ leading rusher in 2006, asked to be released; the Patriots released him on March 2. Safety Tebucky Jones was also released early in the offseason. Another departure came when punter Todd Sauerbrun signed with the Denver Broncos. When Sauerbrun was signed by the Patriots in December 2006, he agreed to a right of first refusal, meaning that the Patriots could match any offer by any other team made in the subsequent offseason. When the unrestricted free agent signing period came, the Broncos tendered Sauerbrun, and the Patriots exercised their right and matched the offer. However, the Broncos argued that the Patriots had not filed the proper documents required for that right, and ordered a hearing before an NFL special master. The Broncos won this hearing and Sauerbrun was allowed to sign with the Broncos. After spending all of training camp with the team, veteran punter Josh Miller was released on August 16.

=== Arrivals ===
In the first week of free agency, the Patriots traded their second- and seventh-round picks in the 2007 NFL draft to the Miami Dolphins for wide receiver Wes Welker. A restricted free agent, Welker signed a five-year contract with the Patriots to complete the trade.

During the second day of the draft, the Patriots added yet another wide receiver, this time trading a fourth-round draft pick (which the Patriots acquired the day before from the San Francisco 49ers with the 49ers’ 2008 first-round pick in exchange for the Patriots’ original 2007 first-round pick) to the Oakland Raiders for Randy Moss, who agreed to take a pay cut of over US$6 million.

The offseason also brought the arrival of seven unrestricted free agents to the Patriots. On offense, the Patriots added running back Sammy Morris, tight end Kyle Brady, as well as wide receivers Donté Stallworth and Kelley Washington. On defense, they added Pro Bowl linebacker Adalius Thomas and cornerbacks Tory James and Eddie Jackson.

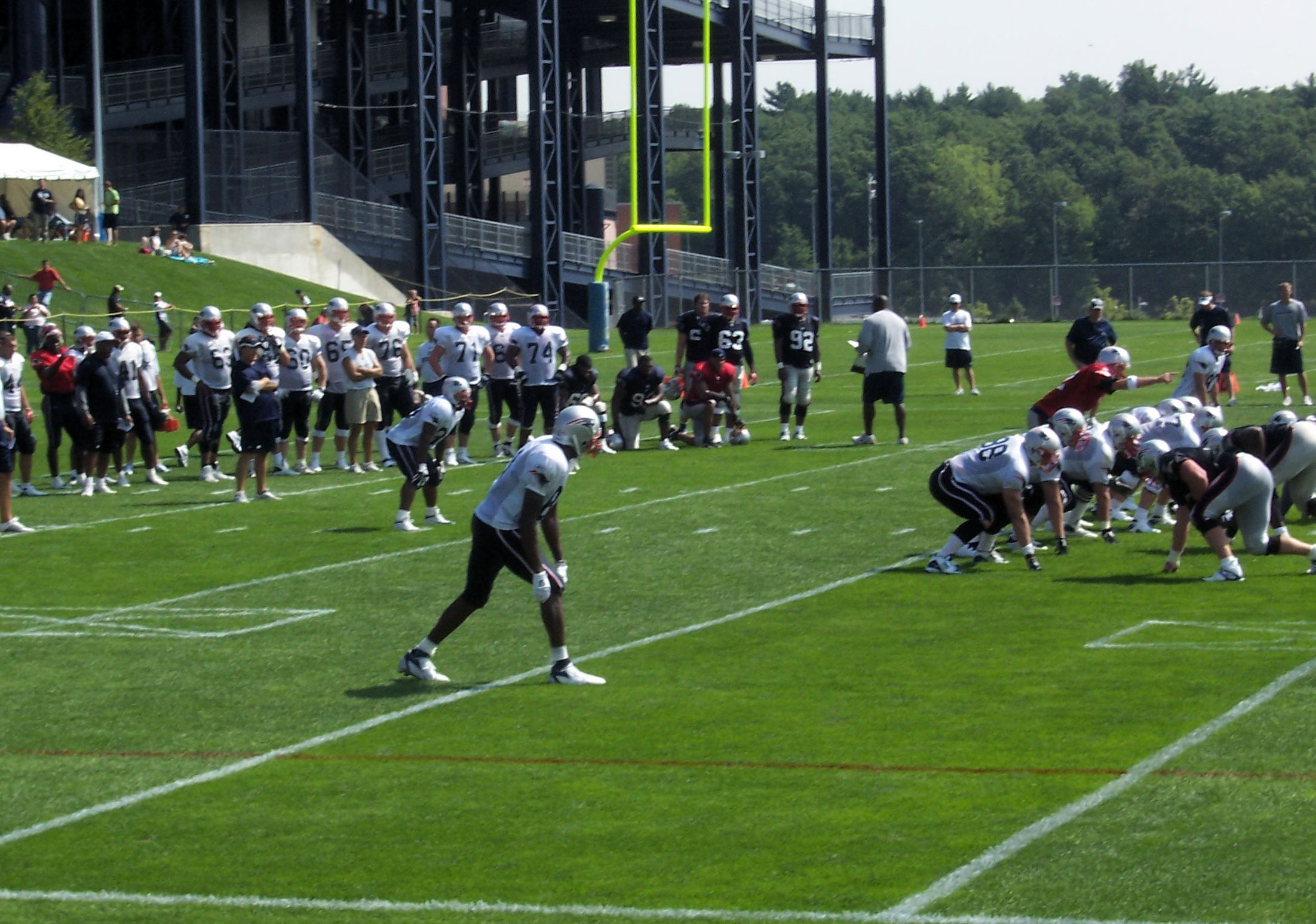
Randy Moss lined up with the offense during the first training camp practice

Free agents or potential free agents Heath Evans, Billy Yates, Larry Izzo, Rashad Baker, Gene Mruczkowski, Junior Seau, Randall Gay, Troy Brown, and Vinny Testaverde were all re-signed. Defensive end Ty Warren also received a long-term contract extension.

The Patriots used their non-exclusive franchise tag on cornerback Asante Samuel; Samuel signed it on August 28, with the stipulation that the team would not use it again on him when he became a free agent again after the season, after the two sides failed to reach a long-term contract agreement with the team by the July 16 deadline.

During the preseason, on August 7, the Patriots traded an undisclosed pick in the 2008 NFL draft to the Chicago Bears for cornerback Dante Wesley, but since Wesley was cut, the Bears did not receive that pick.

=== 2007 NFL draft ===
The Patriots traded their original fifth-round pick (#165 overall) to the Oakland Raiders during the 2006 season for Doug Gabriel. They also traded Patrick Cobbs to the Pittsburgh Steelers and Ross Tucker to the Cleveland Browns prior to the 2006 season for late-round conditional draft picks, but neither players made their respective rosters, so the Patriots received no compensation.

2007 New England Patriots Draft
Round	Selection	Player	Position	College	Notes
1 (Note: The Patriots received the Seattle Seahawks’ first-round draft pick in a 2006 trade for Deion Branch.)	24	Brandon Meriweather	S	Miami (FL)	from Seattle
4	127	Kareem Brown	DE	Miami (FL)	
5	171	Clint Oldenburg	OT	Colorado State	Compensatory pick
6 (Note: The Patriots received the Arizona Cardinals’ sixth-round draft pick (#180 overall) in a conditional 2006 trade for Brandon Gorin.)	180	Justin Rogers	LB	SMU	from Arizona
6	202	Mike Richardson	CB	Notre Dame	
6	208	Justise Hairston	RB	Central Connecticut State	Compensatory pick
6	209	Corey Hilliard	OG	Oklahoma State	
7 (Note: The Patriots traded their third-round pick (#91 overall) to the Oakland Raiders for the Raiders’ seventh-round pick in 2007 (#211 overall) and their third-round pick (#69 overall) in the 2008 NFL draft.)	211	Oscar Lua	Linebacker	USC	from Oakland
7	247	Mike Elgin	Center	Iowa	Compensatory pick

2007 New England Patriots Draft Day Trades
Round	Overall	Team	Action
1	28	to San Francisco 49ers	Received San Francisco's fourth-round pick (110 overall) in 2007 and first-round pick in 2008
3	91	to Oakland Raiders	Received Oakland's seventh-round pick (211 overall) in 2007 and third-round pick in 2008
4	110	from San Francisco 49ers to Oakland Raiders	Received Randy Moss

== Staff ==
2007 New England Patriots staff
Front office: Chairman/CEO – Robert Kraft; President – Jonathan Kraft; Vice president of player personnel – Scott Pioli; Director of college scouting – Thomas Dimitroff; Football research director – Ernie Adams; Head coaches: Head coach – Bill Belichick; Assistant head coach/offensive line – Dante Scarnecchia; Offensive coaches: Offensive coordinator/quarterbacks – Josh McDaniels; Running backs – Ivan Fears; Wide receivers – Nick Caserio; Tight ends – Pete Mangurian; Offensive assistant – Bill O'Brien	Defensive coaches: Defensive coordinator – Dean Pees; Defensive line – Pepper Johnson; Linebackers – Matt Patricia; Secondary – Joel Collier; Coaching assistant – Josh Boyer; Special teams coaches: Special teams – Brad Seely; Coaching assistant – Kevin Bickers; Strength and conditioning: Strength and conditioning – Mike Woicik; Assistant strength and conditioning – Don Davis; Assistant strength and conditioning – Harold Nash

== Opening training camp roster ==
As of the Patriots’ first training camp practice at Gillette Stadium on July 27, they had the NFL maximum of 80 players signed to their roster. First-round pick Brandon Meriweather, who was not signed until after training camp began, did not count against that limit until his signing. Asante Samuel also did not count against the limit, as he had not signed yet signed his franchise tag tender and was not in training camp. Finally, the Patriots received five total roster exemptions for the NFL Europa allocations of Brian Barthelmes, Danny Baugher, and Tom Malone (one for each player, plus two bonus exemptions because of the time Baugher and Malone spent on practice squads in 2007).

New England Patriots 2007 opening training camp roster
Quarterbacks: 12 Tom Brady; 16 Matt Cassel; 7 Matt Gutierrez ^{UR}; Running backs: 44 Heath Evans FB; 33 Kevin Faulk PR; 41 Quadtrine Hill FB; 39 Laurence Maroney; 34 Sammy Morris; 42 Quinton Smith ^{UR}; Wide receivers: 87 Reche Caldwell; 13 Bam Childress; 9 Chris Dunlap ^{UR}; 10 Jabar Gaffney; 2 C. J. Jones; 19 Kelvin Kight; 81 Randy Moss; 18 Donté Stallworth; 15 Kelley Washington; 83 Wes Welker PR; Tight ends: 88 Kyle Brady; 85 Matt Kranchick; 45 Garrett Mills; 84 Benjamin Watson	Offensive linemen: 62 Brian Barthelmes G; 65 Wesley Britt T; 60 Mike Elgin C ^{R}; 63 Corey Hilliard T ^{R}; 71 Russ Hochstein G; 77 Nick Kaczur T; 67 Dan Koppen C; 72 Matt Light T; 70 Logan Mankins G; 64 Gene Mruczkowski G; 61 Stephen Neal G; 68 Ryan O'Callaghan T; 76 Clint Oldenburg T ^{R}; 74 Billy Yates G; Defensive linemen: 95 Kareem Brown DE ^{R}; 97 Jarvis Green DE; 63 Rashad Moore NT; 60 Kenny Smith NT; 90 Le Kevin Smith DE; 92 Santonio Thomas DE; 94 Ty Warren DE; 69 Zach West DE ^{UR}; 75 Vince Wilfork NT; 99 Mike Wright NT	Linebackers: 52 Eric Alexander ILB; 48 Kyle Bissinger OLB ^{UR}; 98 Chad Brown OLB; 54 Tedy Bruschi ILB; 59 Rosevelt Colvin OLB; 53 Larry Izzo ILB; 49 Oscar Lua ILB; 46 Corey Mays ILB; 51 Justin Rogers OLB ^{R}; 55 Junior Seau ILB; 96 Adalius Thomas ILB; 50 Mike Vrabel OLB; 58 Pierre Woods OLB; Defensive backs: 41 Larry Anam SS ^{UR}; 23 Willie Andrews SS; 32 Rashad Baker FS; 21 Randall Gay CB; 37 Rodney Harrison SS; 25 Artrell Hawkins SS; 27 Ellis Hobbs CB; 28 Tory James CB; 35 Mike Richardson CB ^{R}; 36 James Sanders FS; 30 Chad Scott CB; 42 Gemara Williams CB; 26 Eugene Wilson FS; Special teams: 5 Danny Baugher P; 3 Stephen Gostkowski K; 1 Tom Malone P; 8 Josh Miller P; 66 Lonie Paxton LS	Reserve lists: 80 Troy Brown WR (active/PUP); 43 Justise Hairston RB (active/PUP) ^{R}; 17 Chad Jackson WR (active/PUP); 29 Eddie Jackson CB (active/PUP); 24 Mel Mitchell FS (active/PUP); 93 Richard Seymour DE (active/PUP); 86 David Thomas TE (active/PUP); Unrestricted FAs: 22 Asante Samuel CB (Franchise); Unsigned draft picks: 38 Brandon Meriweather CB/S ^{R}; Notations: R: 2007 rookie; UR: 2007 undrafted rookie; Italicized players are not on the 80-man roster.

== Week 1 roster ==
New England Patriots 2007 Week 1 roster
Quarterbacks: 12 Tom Brady; 16 Matt Cassel; 7 Matt Gutierrez ^{UR}; Running backs: 44 Heath Evans FB; 33 Kevin Faulk; 39 Laurence Maroney; 34 Sammy Morris; Wide receivers: 10 Jabar Gaffney; 81 Randy Moss; 18 Donté Stallworth; 15 Kelley Washington; 83 Wes Welker PR; Tight ends: 88 Kyle Brady; 86 David Thomas; 84 Benjamin Watson	Offensive linemen: 65 Wesley Britt T; 71 Russ Hochstein G; 77 Nick Kaczur T; 67 Dan Koppen C; 72 Matt Light T; 70 Logan Mankins G; 61 Stephen Neal G; 68 Ryan O'Callaghan T; 74 Billy Yates G; Defensive linemen: 95 Kareem Brown DE ^{R}; 97 Jarvis Green DE; 90 Le Kevin Smith DE; 92 Santonio Thomas DE; 94 Ty Warren DE; 75 Vince Wilfork NT; 99 Mike Wright NT	Linebackers: 52 Eric Alexander ILB; 54 Tedy Bruschi ILB; 59 Rosevelt Colvin OLB; 51 David Herron ILB ^{UR}; 53 Larry Izzo ILB; 46 Corey Mays ILB; 55 Junior Seau ILB; 96 Adalius Thomas ILB; 50 Mike Vrabel OLB; 58 Pierre Woods OLB; Defensive backs: 23 Willie Andrews SS; 32 Rashad Baker FS; 21 Randall Gay CB; 27 Ellis Hobbs CB; 31 Brandon Meriweather CB ^{R}; 24 Mel Mitchell FS; 22 Asante Samuel CB; 36 James Sanders SS; 26 Eugene Wilson FS; Special teams: 3 Stephen Gostkowski K; 6 Chris Hanson P; 66 Lonie Paxton LS	Reserve lists: 80 Troy Brown WR (PUP); 43 Justise Hairston RB (IR) ^{R}; 37 Rodney Harrison SS (Susp.); 17 Chad Jackson WR (PUP); 29 Eddie Jackson CB (PUP); 49 Oscar Lua ILB (IR) ^{R}; 35 Mike Richardson CB (IR) ^{R}; 30 Chad Scott CB (IR); 93 Richard Seymour DE (PUP); Practice Squad: 13 Bam Childress WR; 38 Kyle Eckel FB; 19 C. J. Jones WR; 76 Clint Oldenburg OT ^{R}; 85 Jason Rader TE; Notations: R: 2007 rookie; UR: 2007 undrafted rookie; Italicized players are not on the 53-man roster.

== Schedule ==
=== Preseason ===
Week	Date	Opponent	Result	Record	Venue	Recap
1	August 10	at Tampa Bay Buccaneers	**L** 10–13	0–1	Raymond James Stadium	Recap
2	August 17	Tennessee Titans	**L** 24–27	0–2	Gillette Stadium	Recap
3	August 24	at Carolina Panthers	**W** 24–7	1–2	Bank of America Stadium	Recap
4	August 30	New York Giants	**W** 27–20	2–2	Gillette Stadium	Recap

=== Regular season ===
Week	Date	Opponent	Result	Record	Venue	Recap
1	September 9	at **New York Jets**	**W** 38–14	1–0	Giants Stadium	Recap
2	September 16	San Diego Chargers	**W** 38–14	2–0	Gillette Stadium	Recap
3	September 23	**Buffalo Bills**	**W** 38–7	3–0	Gillette Stadium	Recap
4	October 1	at Cincinnati Bengals	**W** 34–13	4–0	Paul Brown Stadium	Recap
5	October 7	Cleveland Browns	**W** 34–17	5–0	Gillette Stadium	Recap
6	October 14	at Dallas Cowboys	**W** 48–27	6–0	Texas Stadium	Recap
7	October 21	at **Miami Dolphins**	**W** 49–28	7–0	Dolphin Stadium	Recap
8	October 28	Washington Redskins	**W** 52–7	8–0	Gillette Stadium	Recap
9	November 4	at Indianapolis Colts	**W** 24–20	9–0	RCA Dome	Recap
10	Bye					
11	November 18	at **Buffalo Bills**	**W** 56–10	10–0	Ralph Wilson Stadium	Recap
12	November 25	Philadelphia Eagles	**W** 31–28	11–0	Gillette Stadium	Recap
13	December 3	at Baltimore Ravens	**W** 27–24	12–0	M&T Bank Stadium	Recap
14	December 9	Pittsburgh Steelers	**W** 34–13	13–0	Gillette Stadium	Recap
15	December 16	**New York Jets**	**W** 20–10	14–0	Gillette Stadium	Recap
16	December 23	**Miami Dolphins**	**W** 28–7	15–0	Gillette Stadium	Recap
17	December 29	at New York Giants	**W** 38–35	16–0	Giants Stadium	Recap
Note: Intra-division opponents are in bold text.

== Regular season results ==
=== Week 1: at New York Jets ===
Quarter	1	2	3	4	Total
Patriots	7	7	14	10	38
Jets	0	7	7	0	14

at Giants Stadium, East Rutherford, New Jersey

- Game time: 1:00 p.m. EDT
- Game weather: 84 °F (29 °C), partly cloudy
- Game attendance: 77,900
- Referee: Jeff Triplette
- TV announcers (CBS): Jim Nantz (play-by-play) and Phil Simms (color commentator)

In the Patriots’ fourth matchup with the Jets in 20 games, head coach Bill Belichick and the Patriots traveled to Giants Stadium to face his former defensive coordinator in Jets head coach Eric Mangini to open the season. The Jets reached Patriots territory on their opening possession, but were forced to punt. The Patriots then began a 12-play, 91-yard drive that ended in an 11-yard Wes Welker touchdown reception to give the Patriots a 7–0 lead. On the ensuing kickoff, Kelley Washington forced a fumble on Jets returner Justin Miller after a 26-yard return, but tight end Chris Baker recovered the ball at the Jets’ 33-yard line to retain possession. The Jets went three-and-out, but the Patriots punted back to the Jets despite a 19-yard Donté Stallworth catch to begin their next series. Three plays later, Jets quarterback Chad Pennington was sacked by linebacker Mike Vrabel and defensive end Ty Warren, forcing a Jets punt on the final play of the first quarter.

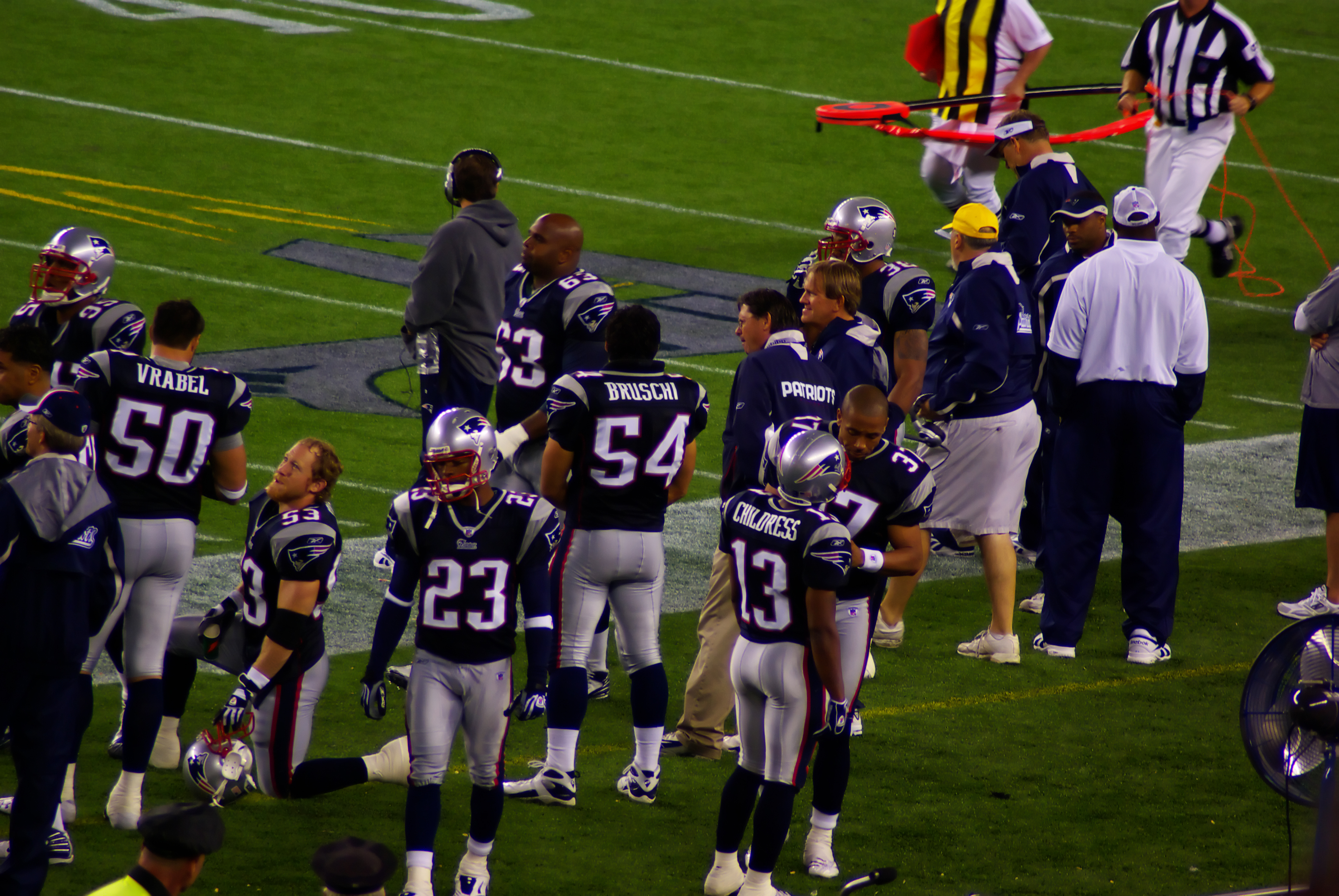
Patriots players on the sideline during the 2007 preseason

Starting from their own 42-yard line after the punt, the Patriots reached the Jets’ 25-yard line, where kicker Stephen Gostkowski lined up for a 42-yard field goal attempt. However, the snap was fumbled by holder Matt Cassel, and recovered by Cassel to turn the ball over on downs. The Jets responded with a 10-play, 66-yard drive, tying the game at 7–7 on a 7-yard pass from Pennington to wide receiver Laveranues Coles. Several plays into the Patriots’ ensuing drive, before and after the two-minute warning, wide receiver Randy Moss caught passes of 33- and 22-yards from quarterback Tom Brady to put the Patriots in the Jets’ red zone. Brady then connected with tight end Benjamin Watson on a 5-yard touchdown pass that was reviewed by the booth but upheld, giving the Patriots a 14–7 lead going into halftime.

Patriots cornerback Ellis Hobbs returned the opening kickoff of the second half 108 yards for a touchdown and a new NFL record for the longest kickoff return in the league's history; at the time, it also tied the existing record for longest play in NFL history (a record broken a few weeks later by Antonio Cromartie). Nine plays into the Jets’ next drive, Pennington was sacked by defensive lineman Jarvis Green and was injured; Kellen Clemens entered the game but the Jets were forced to punt two plays later. Four plays later, Brady hit Moss for a 51-yard touchdown reception that extended the Patriots’ lead to 28–7. However, the Jets came back with a 9-play, 70-yard drive that was capped off with Coles’ second touchdown grab of the day, this one from one yard out, to cut the Patriots’ lead to 28–14. The Patriots received the ensuing kickoff with just over two minutes remaining in the third quarter and would not surrender the ball until there was just under seven minutes remaining in the fourth quarter, ending the 17-play drive with a 22-yard Gostkowski field goal that extended the Patriots’ lead to 31–14. The Jets then went three-and-out, and punter Ben Graham’s 36-yard punt gave the Patriots the ball at their own 47-yard line. On a 1st-and-goal from the Jets’ 1-yard line, fullback Heath Evans could not score; the Patriots challenged that the ball did in fact break the plane of the goal line but the play was upheld. On the next play, following the two-minute warning, Evans did in fact score on a 1-yard run, increasing the Patriots’ lead to 38–14. The Jets’ next drive stalled on a Vrabel strip-sack of Clemens that the Jets recovered, but ended on a failed fourth down conversion from the Jets’ 38-yard line. The Patriots then kneeled down once to end the game and give them their first victory of the season as they started 1–0.

==== Videotaping incident ====
On September 10, Bill Belichick was accused by the Jets of authorizing his staff to film the Jets’ defensive signals from an on-field location, a violation of league rules. The Jets confiscated the video camera used by video assistant Matt Estrella to film the signals during the game and filed a complaint to the league office, detailing the accusations.

On September 13, Belichick was officially fined $500,000, while the Patriots were also fined $250,000, and forfeited their first round draft pick in the 2008 NFL draft. If the Patriots had missed the playoffs, they would have instead forfeited their second and third round selections in the 2008 draft. Goodell said that he fined the Patriots as a team because Belichick is effectively the team's general manager as well as head coach, and exercises so much control over the Patriots’ on-field operations that “his actions and decisions are properly attributed to the club.” Goodell considered suspending Belichick, but decided that taking away draft picks would be more severe in the long run.

Belichick later issued a statement in which he apologized for what he called a “mistake” in his interpretation of the rules. However, he denied ever using videotape to gain an advantage while a game was underway.

=== Week 2: vs. San Diego Chargers ===
Quarter	1	2	3	4	Total
Chargers	0	0	7	7	14
Patriots	14	10	7	7	38

at Gillette Stadium, Foxborough, Massachusetts

- Game time: 8:15 p.m. EDT
- Game weather: 55 °F (13 °C), clear
- Game attendance: 68,756
- Referee: Ed Hochuli
- TV announcers (NBC): Al Michaels (play-by-play), John Madden (color commentator), and Andrea Kremer (sideline reporter)

The Patriots’ home opener was a rematch from the 2006 divisional playoffs, against the Chargers on Sunday Night Football. For the second consecutive week, the game began with a touchdown on the Patriots’ first series: this time, Brady hit Watson for a 7-yard touchdown pass to give the Patriots a 7–0 lead. On the first play of the ensuing Chargers possession, their first, linebacker Rosevelt Colvin intercepted a Philip Rivers pass, but it did not translate into points for the Patriots as Gostkowski then missed a 41-yard field goal attempt on the Patriots’ resulting series. After a Chargers three-and-out, the Patriots capped off a 10-play, 75-yard drive with a 23-yard Moss touchdown reception, putting the Patriots ahead 14–0. Colvin then added a sack and forced fumble to his game statistics, as he strip-sacked Rivers after the Chargers reached the Patriots’ 34-yard line and nose tackle Vince Wilfork recovered the fumble for the Patriots’ second forced turnover of the game.

On the Patriots’ next drive, which spanned into the second quarter, Brady was strip-sacked by linebacker Shawne Merriman at the Chargers’ 29-yard line, but Brady recovered his own fumble to retain possession for the Patriots. Six plays later, a 24-yard Gostkowski field goal extended the Patriots’ lead to 17–0. After a Chargers three-and-out, the Patriots were pushed back to their 10-yard line after another Merriman sack of Brady. The Patriots would punt back to the Chargers, but on a 3rd-and-1 from the Patriots’ 37-yard line, Rivers was intercepted by linebacker Adalius Thomas, who returned it 65 yards for a touchdown, giving the Patriots a 24–0 lead. The Chargers were unable to get past midfield on their next drive and punted, giving the Patriots the ball at their own 20-yard line with just under three minutes to play in the first half. A 25-yard defensive pass interference penalty on Chargers safety Marlon McCree would help the Patriots reach the Chargers’ 26-yard line, but Brady was intercepted by safety Clinton Hart at the Chargers’ 10-yard line. The Chargers then ran one play to end the half.

Receiving the kickoff to begin the second half, the Chargers embarked on a 16-play, 72-yard drive, reaching Patriots territory on a 22-yard third down reception by tight end Antonio Gates. Ten plays later, fullback Lorenzo Neal caught a 1-yard touchdown pass from Rivers to put the Chargers on the scoreboard at 24–7. The Patriots responded by going 75 yards on seven plays, taking a 31–7 lead on a 24-yard Moss touchdown reception, his second of the night. Three plays later, Rivers was intercepted by Patriots safety James Sanders at the Patriots’ 38-yard line, but the play was nullified by a 37-yard defensive pass interference penalty on Hobbs. Rivers completions of 19 yards to wide receiver Malcom Floyd and 12 yards to running back Michael Turner helped put the Chargers in the Patriots’ red zone, where Rivers completed a 12-yard touchdown pass to Gates on the second play of the fourth quarter to cut the Patriots’ lead to 31–14.

On the ensuing kickoff, Chargers wide receiver Kassim Osgood forced a fumble of Hobbs after a 31-yard return that was recovered by Chargers cornerback Quentin Jammer at the Patriots’ 31-yard line. However, Rivers was sacked twice for losses of 10 yards each on the next two plays, the second of which was a strip-sack by Colvin that was recovered by offensive lineman Kris Dielman; the Chargers punted on 4th-and-30. Starting from their own 9-yard line with more than 13 minutes remaining in the game, the Patriots did not surrender the ball back to the Chargers until there was less than four minutes left in the fourth quarter. This 15-play, 91-yard drive culminated in a 3-yard touchdown run by running back Sammy Morris, extending the Patriots’ lead to 38–14. The Chargers could not convert a first down on their next possession, giving the ball back to the Patriots to end the game as they improved to 2–0.

=== Week 3 vs. Buffalo Bills ===
Quarter	1	2	3	4	Total
Bills	7	0	0	0	7
Patriots	3	14	14	7	38

at Gillette Stadium, Foxborough, Massachusetts

- Game time: 1:00 p.m. EDT
- Game weather: 74 °F (23 °C), clear
- Game attendance: 68,756
- Referee: Scott Green
- TV announcers (CBS): Kevin Harlan (play-by-play) and Rich Gannon (color commentator)

The 0–2 Bills, who had not beaten the Patriots since Week 1 of the 2003 season, faced off against the Patriots in Foxboro. On the opening drive of the game, Wilfork was penalized for roughing the passer for a late hit on Bills quarterback J. P. Losman. Two plays later, Hobbs sacked Losman, causing a fumble at the Bills’ 35-yard line that set up a 24-yard Gostkowski field goal. Trent Edwards replaced Losman at quarterback for the Bills on their next possession. Losman was later diagnosed with a sprained MCL. The Bills took the lead on a 12-play drive finished off with an 8-yard Marshawn Lynch touchdown run, but these points proved to be the only of the game for the Bills. Early in the second quarter, the Patriots drove to the Bills’ 29-yard line, but on fourth down, opted not to punt; the gamble did not pay off and the Patriots turned the ball over on downs. After a Bills three-and-out, the Patriots again drove deep into Bills’ territory, this time to the Bills’ 3-yard line, but a Brady fumble on a rushing attempt kept the Patriots from scoring. The Patriots challenged the ruling but it was upheld. The Bills could not advance past their own 1-yard line on their next possession, with punter Brian Moorman booming a 75-yard kick that was returned 29 yards by Welker. Starting in Bills’ territory, Brady culminated a six-play drive with an 8-yard touchdown pass to Watson. Another Bills punt gave the Patriots the ball in Bills territory again, setting up another six-play drive that ended in a 3-yard touchdown catch by Moss.

After the teams exchanged three-and-outs to begin the second half, the Patriots embarked on a nine-play, 89-yard drive that ended on a 4-yard Jabar Gaffney touchdown reception that gave the Patriots a 24–7 lead. After another punt, the Patriots advanced into Bills territory on a 26-yard pass to Welker that was kept alive when Welker lateraled to Moss for another 11 yards. Morris then ran in for a 4-yard touchdown. The Bills were able to pin the Patriots at their own 2-yard line on their next punt, but that only proved to be the beginning of a 10-play, 98-yard drive that came to a close when Brady connected with Moss on a 45-yard touchdown pass, extending the Patriots’ lead to 38–7. The catch made Moss the first player in NFL history to have three games with at least 100 receiving yards to start a season. After an exchange of punts, the Bills began their ensuing drive with Edwards throwing an interception to cornerback Asante Samuel, which was returned 42 yards to the Bills’ 12-yard line. However, the Patriots could not generate any points off the turnover, with an Evans run on fourth down from the Bills’ 8-yard line coming up short of the first down. The game would end on the Bills’ next drive, sending the Patriots to a 3–0 start.

=== Week 4: at Cincinnati Bengals ===
Quarter	1	2	3	4	Total
Patriots	10	7	7	10	34
Bengals	0	7	3	3	13

at Paul Brown Stadium, Cincinnati, Ohio

- Game time: 8:30 p.m. EDT
- Game weather: 72 °F (22 °C), clear & mild
- Game attendance: 66,113
- Referee: Jerome Boger
- TV announcers: Mike Tirico (play-by-play), Ron Jaworski and Tony Kornheiser (color commentators), Michele Tafoya and Suzy Kolber (sideline reporters)

Coming off a divisional win at home over the Bills, the Patriots traveled to Paul Brown Stadium for a matchup with the Bengals. On the game's opening drive, the Patriots drove 66 yards on 11 plays, stalling at the Bengals’ 13-yard line before Gostkowski hit a 31-yard field goal. The Bengals’ next drive would span five plays but only one yard, ending in a punt. After an exchange of punts, the Patriots began a drive from their own 35-yard line, but quickly advanced into Bengals territory on a 49-yard Morris run. Three plays later, Brady hit Vrabel on a 1-yard touchdown pass to extend the Patriots lead to 10–0. After a Bengals punt on the first play of the second quarter, the Patriots had the ball but found themselves in a 3rd-and-23 situation, when Brady was intercepted by Leon Hall at the Bengals’ 35-yard line. The Bengals capitalized on the turnover, with Carson Palmer ending a five-play drive on a 1-yard touchdown pass to T. J. Houshmandzadeh. The Patriots responded by going on a 12-yard, 62-yard drive, finishing it with a 7-yard Moss touchdown reception, putting the Patriots ahead 17–7. The Bengals managed to reach the Patriots’ 20-yard line on their next possession, but a Samuel interception at the 2-yard line kept the Bengals from scoring at the end of the first half.

The Bengals reached midfield on the opening drive of the third quarter before punting. From their own 19-yard line, the Patriots moved deep in Bengals territory after a 15-yard penalty was tacked onto a 16-yard Moss catch. A few plays later, Morris ran for his second touchdown of the night; the 7-yard run opened the Patriots lead to 24–7. The Bengals, though, continued to threaten the Patriots offensively, moving to the Patriots’ 22-yard line before linebacker Tedy Bruschi tipped a third-down pass to force a 40-yard Shayne Graham field goal. The Patriots next drive spanned into the fourth quarter but a Morris run on third down from the Bengals’ 13-yard line was stopped for a loss, setting up a 36-yard Gostkowski field goal. Yet again, the Bengals moved into Patriots territory on their ensuing drive, but the Patriots defense prevented another touchdown and forced a 48-yard field goal, making the score 27–13. On the Patriots’ next drive, a 23-yard Stallworth catch put the Patriots in Bengals territory, setting up a 14-yard touchdown pass from Brady to Moss. Down 34–13, the Bengals continued to move the ball with a 17-yard Houshmandzadeh catch on the next play, but Palmer's next pass attempt was intercepted by Randall Gay at the Patriots’ 47-yard line. The Patriots then ran out the clock to end the game and bring their record to 4–0.

=== Week 5: vs. Cleveland Browns ===
Quarter	1	2	3	4	Total
Browns	0	0	3	14	17
Patriots	10	10	0	14	34

at Gillette Stadium, Foxborough, Massachusetts

- Game time: 1:00 p.m. EDT
- Game weather: 56 °F (13 °C), cloudy and cool, chance of showers
- Game attendance: 68,756
- Referee: Walt Coleman
- TV announcers (CBS): Greg Gumbel (play-by-play) and Dan Dierdorf (color commentator)

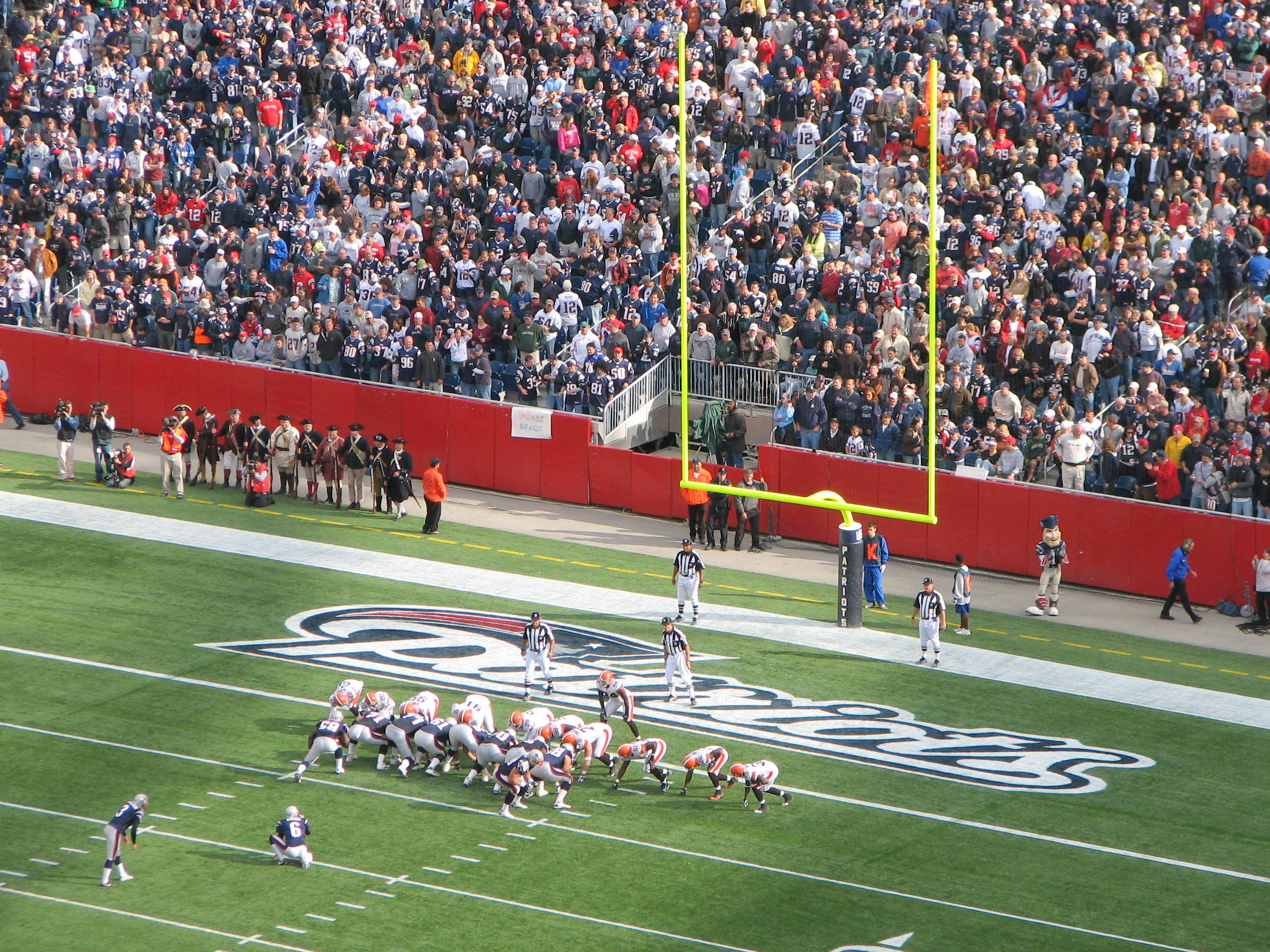
Kicking after a touchdown against the Browns

Returning to Foxboro, the Patriots faced off against the Browns, coached by their former defensive coordinator Romeo Crennel. The Patriots opened the game with a 14-play, 78-yard drive culminating in a Gostkowski 20-yard field goal. After a 65-yard drive brought them to the Patriots’ 1-yard line, the Browns failed to score on two downs before quarterback Derek Anderson threw an interception to linebacker Junior Seau on third down. Following a Patriots three-and-out, a Samuel interception on the first play of the Browns’ next drive gave the Patriots the ball at the Browns’ 34-yard line. Brady quickly turned the turnover into points, throwing a 34-yard touchdown pass to Stallworth to give the Patriots a 10–0 lead. The Browns would then punt on their next drive. On the first drive of the second quarter, the Patriots would move into Browns territory but were forced to punt, giving the Browns the ball at their own 12-yard line. After a 36-yard punt by Scott Player, the Patriots began their ensuing drive from their own 49-yard line. They would advance to the Browns’ 4-yard line, but a Morris run for a loss forced a 25-yard Gostkowski field goal, giving the Patriots a 13–0 lead. The Browns’ next drive showed promise after Anderson moved the team from their own 10-yard line to the 46-yard line, but following the two-minute warning a false start penalty and then an interception by Seau, his second of the game, ended the advance. With good field position, Brady moved the 25 necessary yards in three plays, taking a 20–0 lead on a 7-yard Watson touchdown reception. A Bruschi sack then forced the Browns to take a knee to end the half.

In the second half, both teams exchanged punts before the Browns began an 8-play, 56-yard drive that got them on the scoreboard, with Phil Dawson kicking a 42-yard field goal. Neither team could advance past midfield until the closing minutes of the quarter. The Browns would then score their first touchdown of the day, on a 21-yard strike from Anderson to wide receiver Tim Carter. The Patriots would respond with their own touchdown drive, taking a 27–10 lead on a 25-yard touchdown catch by Watson. After an exchange of punts gave the Browns the ball at the Patriots’ 35-yard line, Anderson threw his second touchdown pass of the day, this one good for 14 yards to tight end Kellen Winslow II to pull the Browns to within 10 points. The Patriots were able to hold the ball for the next five minutes, but could not score, with a Brady pass to Vrabel falling incomplete on fourth down from the Browns’ 4-yard line. However, this meant the Browns had to begin their next drive from that spot, and on the first play, Winslow fumbled a 15-yard catch, which was recovered by Gay and returned for a touchdown. The Browns reached the Patriots’ 10-yard line on the final possession of the game, but could not score, ending the game at 34–17, giving the Patriots their fifth win of the season as they improved to 5–0. With three touchdown passes on the day, Brady tied Steve Young’s 1998 record of five consecutive three-touchdown games to start the season.

=== Week 6: at Dallas Cowboys ===
Week Six: New England Patriots (5–0) at Dallas Cowboys (5–0)

Quarter	1	2	3	4	Total
Patriots	14	7	10	17	48
Cowboys	0	17	7	3	27

at Texas Stadium • Irving, Texas

- Date: October 14
- Game time: 3:00 p.m. CDT
- Game weather: Indoors (partial dome) • 85 °F (29 °C) • Wind none
- Game attendance: 63,984
- Referee: Mike Carey
- TV announcers (CBS): Jim Nantz and Phil Simms
- Gamebook

Game information

Patriots

- Tom Brady
  31/46, 388 Yds, 5 TD
- Kevin Faulk
  12 Rush, 47 Yds
- Donté Stallworth
  7 Rec, 136 Yds, TD

Cowboys

- Tony Romo
  18/29, 199 Yds, 2 TD, INT
- Julius Jones
  6 Rush, 51 Yds
- Terrell Owens
  6 Rec, 66 Yds, TD

Tom Brady’s 100th regular season start. In what was, at the time, the most-watched NFL regular season game since 1996, the Patriots faced the Cowboys, the NFC's only remaining unbeaten team. The Patriots’ first drive of the game spanned 74 yards and ended in a 6-yard touchdown catch by Moss from Brady. After three punts, the Patriots’ lead increased to 14–0 after another Brady touchdown pass, this one from 35 yards out to Welker. In the second quarter, the Cowboys got on the scoreboard when they culminated a 64-yard, 10-play drive with a 38-yard field goal by Nick Folk. On their ensuing possession, the Patriots advanced 12 yards before Brady was strip-sacked by defensive end Greg Ellis; defensive end Jason Hatcher recovered the ball and returned it 29 yards for a touchdown, cutting the Patriots’ lead to 14–10. The Patriots responded with a 12-play, 72-yard drive that ended on a 12-yard touchdown pass from Brady to Welker, his second of the day. The Cowboys then moved the ball 84 yards, keeping pace with the Patriots when Tony Romo threw to Terrell Owens for a 12-yard touchdown grab of his own, giving the game a 21–17 score at halftime.

In the third quarter, after a Patriots punt, an 8-yard touchdown catch from Romo to wide receiver Patrick Crayton put the Patriots behind 24–21. However, the Patriots offense continued to move the ball too, with a 77-yard drive ending on a one-yard touchdown reception by Kyle Brady. Following a Cowboys punt that gave the Patriots the ball in Cowboys territory, the Patriots appeared to extend their lead on a 43-yard Moss touchdown catch, but the play was reversed as Moss was found not have caught the ball. A roughing the passer penalty was called on the play, though, setting up a 45-yard Gostkowski field goal to make the score 31–24. The Cowboys would punt early in the fourth quarter. Four plays later, Brady threw his fifth touchdown pass of the day, a franchise record. Stallworth's 69-yard catch gave the Patriots a 38–24 lead, but the Cowboys quickly responded with a 72-yard kickoff return by Tyson Thompson. The Cowboys turned that return into three points on a 23-yard field goal by Folk. The Patriots then ate more clock, moving 61 yards in just over six minutes, adding to their lead on a 22-yard Gostkowski field goal. Romo was intercepted by Seau on the next play, allowing the Patriots to run out more clock before Kyle Eckel ran in for a 1-yard touchdown. Romo then kneeled to end the game with a 48–27 final.

With the win, the Patriots improved to 6–0. Though his first 100 regular season NFL starts, Brady was 76-24.

Scoring summary

Quarter	Time	Drive			Team	Scoring information	Score	
Quarter	Time	Plays	Yards	TOP	Team	Scoring information	NE	DAL
1	7:48	14	74	5:29	Patriots	Randy Moss 6-yard touchdown reception from Tom Brady, Stephen Gostkowski kick good	7	0
1	2:14	6	69	2:11	Patriots	Wes Welker 35-yard touchdown reception from Tom Brady, Stephen Gostkowski kick good	14	0
2	12:31	10	64	4:43	Cowboys	38-yard field goal by Nick Folk	14	3
2	10:25				Cowboys	Fumble recovery returned 29 yards for touchdown by Jason Hatcher, Nick Folk kick good	14	10
2	3:34	12	72	6:51	Patriots	Wes Welker 12-yard touchdown reception from Tom Brady, Stephen Gostkowski kick good	21	10
2	0:46	8	84	2:48	Cowboys	Terrell Owens 12-yard touchdown reception from Tony Romo, Nick Folk kick good	21	17
3	10:20	7	74	3:36	Cowboys	Patrick Crayton 8-yard touchdown reception from Tony Romo, Nick Folk kick good	21	24
3	4:56	10	77	5:24	Patriots	Kyle Brady 1-yard touchdown reception from Tom Brady, Stephen Gostkowski kick good	28	24
3	2:14	4	16	1:32	Patriots	45-yard field goal by Stephen Gostkowski	31	24
4	12:21	4	80	2:13	Patriots	Donté Stallworth 69-yard touchdown reception from Tom Brady, Stephen Gostkowski kick good	38	24
4	10:03	5	18	2:18	Cowboys	23-yard field goal by Nick Folk	38	27
4	3:59	12	61	6:04	Patriots	22-yard field goal by Stephen Gostkowski	41	27
4	0:19	7	20	3:26	Patriots	Kyle Eckel 1-yard touchdown run, Stephen Gostkowski kick good	48	27
"TOP" = time of possession. For other American football terms, see Glossary of American football.							48	27

=== Week 7: at Miami Dolphins ===
Quarter	1	2	3	4	Total
Patriots	14	28	0	7	49
Dolphins	0	7	0	21	28

at Dolphin Stadium, Miami Gardens, Florida

- Game time: 1:00 p.m. EDT
- Game weather: 85 °F (29 °C), sunny
- Game attendance: 71,951
- Referee: Pete Morelli
- TV announcers (CBS): Greg Gumbel (play-by-play) and Dan Dierdorf (color commentator)

A week after facing the undefeated Cowboys, the Patriots squared off against the winless Dolphins. The Patriots took the opening drive of the game 80 yards and capped it off with a 30-yard touchdown pass from Brady to Stallworth. After Dolphins quarterback Cleo Lemon fumbled to give the Patriots the ball on the Dolphins’ 28-yard line, the Patriots took a 14–0 lead with a 2-yard touchdown reception by Kyle Brady. The Dolphins cut the lead in half with a 4-yard Lemon touchdown run to end a 79-yard drive early in the second quarter, but Willie Andrews returned the ensuing kickoff 74 yards to give the Patriots another 14-point lead. Following a Dolphins punt, a 36-yard Welker reception set up a 35-yard Moss touchdown catch. After another Dolphins punt, Brady connected with Moss on a 50-yard touchdown strike, giving the Patriots a 35–7 lead. An exchange of punts left the Dolphins with the ball at their own 1-yard line, but a 49-yard punt by Brandon Fields and a holding penalty on Kelley Washington gave the Patriots the ball at their own 29-yard line. Still, Brady led the Patriots on another scoring drive, ending this one on a 14-yard Welker catch to give the Patriots a 42–7 lead going into halftime. The 42 points scored in the half were a franchise record.

In the second half, the Dolphins drove to the Patriots’ 19-yard line on a drive that spanned more than nine minutes, but a Gay interception retained the Patriots’ 42–7 lead, one that remained for the duration of the third quarter. Following a Patriots punt, the Dolphins began a 10-play, 80-yard drive that ended on a 1-yard Patrick Cobbs touchdown run early in the fourth quarter, cutting their deficit to 28 points. The Patriots replaced Brady with backup Cassel on the next drive, but after Cassel threw an interception to defensive end Jason Taylor which Taylor returned for a touchdown, Brady returned for the Patriots’ next possession. That drive spanned 59 yards and ended with a 16-yard Welker touchdown catch, Brady's sixth touchdown pass of the game, a Patriots record. On their penultimate drive of the game, the Dolphins drove 75 yards and ended the game's scoring with a 7-yard Jesse Chatman touchdown run. The Patriots ran the clock to within two minutes before punting; Lemon ended the game with a 12-yard sack by Seau near midfield. With their 49–28 win, the Patriots began a season 7–0 for the first time in team history. During the game, Tom Brady earned the first perfect passer rating of his career.

=== Week 8: vs. Washington Redskins ===
Quarter	1	2	3	4	Total
Redskins	0	0	0	7	7
Patriots	7	17	14	14	52

at Gillette Stadium, Foxborough, Massachusetts

- Game time: 4:15 p.m. EDT
- Game weather: 55 °F (13 °C), clear, windy and cool
- Game attendance: 68,756
- Referee: Larry Nemmers
- TV announcers (Fox): Kenny Albert (play-by-play), Troy Aikman (color commentator), and Pam Oliver (sideline reporter)

At home for the first time in three weeks, the Patriots, looking to remain unbeaten, faced off against the 4–2 Redskins. After spending the first seven weeks of the season on the Physically Unable to Perform list, defensive end Richard Seymour was activated for the game, but did not start. Following a Redskins punt, in their first possession of the game, the Patriots drove 90 yards over more than 7 minutes, finishing the drive with a 3-yard Brady rushing touchdown, continuing a season-long opening drive scoring streak. The teams exchanged punts into the second quarter, before a 67-yard Patriots drive was capped off with a 2-yard touchdown reception by Vrabel, his second for the season and the tenth of his career (including playoffs). On the Redskins’ ensuing possession, Warren recovered a Vrabel strip-sack of Jason Campbell at the Redskins’ 21-yard line, setting up a 36-yard Gostkowski field goal. The Redskins turned the ball over again on their next possession on a Samuel interception, only to regain it on the next play after Brady was strip-sacked by Phillip Daniels at the Patriots’ 40-yard line. The string of turnovers continued as the Redskins drove 20 yards before another Vrabel strip-sack of Campbell was again recovered by Warren. With less than 2 minutes remaining in the first half, the Patriots drove 73 yards, and on a fake spike play from the Redskins’ 6-yard line, increased their lead to 24–0 on a touchdown catch by Moss from Brady. That touchdown pass was Brady's 29th of the season, eclipsing his career high set in 2004 and 2002, but with it only being week 8, accomplished this in only playing through the first eight of 16 games.

On the opening drive of the second half, an 85-yard Patriots drive ended in another Brady touchdown run, this one from 2 yards out. The Redskins committed their fourth turnover of the game on their next possession, as Vrabel strip-sacked Campbell for the third time in the game; this time Colvin recovered the fumble and returned it 11 yards for a touchdown to increase the Patriots’ lead to 38–0. The Redskins managed to reach the Patriots’ 13-yard line on their next drive, but on fourth down, the Redskins could not convert and turned the ball over again. The Patriots began their next drive where they left off, going 88 yards on a 14-play drive that spanned into the fourth quarter. It was finished on a 2-yard touchdown reception by Welker that grew the Patriots lead to 45–0. Following a Redskins punt, on the Patriots’ next series, Cassel replaced Brady. A 21-yard pass from Cassel to Gaffney gave the Patriots their 33rd first down of the game, a new single-game franchise record. Two plays later, Cassel ran it in for a touchdown from 15 yards out, and the first rushing touchdown of his career, increasing the Patriots’ lead to 52–0; the touchdown was the longest rushing touchdown by a Patriots quarterback in more than 20 years. The Redskins then drove 63 yards and scored their only points of the game on a 15-yard Chris Cooley touchdown reception. Third-string quarterback Matt Gutierrez replaced Cassel on the next possession, a three-and-out. The Redskins then punted back to the Patriots to end the game. The Patriots’ 52–7 win gave them an 8–0 record heading into a Week 9 matchup against the 7–0 Colts. It also made Brady only the second quarterback to defeat the other 31 teams at least once; the Colts’ Peyton Manning was the first to accomplish the feat, having done so earlier that day.

=== Week 9: at Indianapolis Colts ===
Quarter	1	2	3	4	Total
Patriots	0	7	3	14	24
Colts	3	10	0	7	20

at RCA Dome, Indianapolis, Indiana

- Game time: 4:15 p.m. EST
- Game weather: Played indoors, domed stadium
- Game attendance: 57,540
- Referee: John Parry
- TV announcers (CBS): Jim Nantz (play-by-play) and Phil Simms (color commentator)

For the second time in four weeks, a Patriots game set TV rating records: their game against the 7–0 Colts was the most-watched Sunday afternoon NFL regular season game since 1987, when network records began. The game was also notable for being the latest in an NFL season that two undefeated teams have ever faced off against each other. It was the first time that the last two unbeaten teams had met since 1997 when the Patriots lost to the Broncos and only the second time that the last two unbeaten teams had met since 1973. After playing four of their last six games in Foxboro, the Patriots traveled to Indianapolis to face the Colts in a re-match of the 2006–07 AFC Championship game in a game some members of the media dubbed “Super Bowl XLI 1/2. “ On the game's opening series, the Colts drove 52 yards on 14 plays but left the field without scoring after former Patriots kicker Adam Vinatieri missed a 50-yard field goal, his first-ever miss in the RCA Dome. On the ensuing drive, the Patriots failed to make a first down, the first opening drive of the season in which they failed to score. With the ball on their own 9-yard line, the Colts moved to the Patriots’ 3-yard line after two Joseph Addai rushes for 33 yards and a 37-yard defensive pass interference penalty on Asante Samuel. After two plays gaining no yards, the Colts were again forced to kick a field goal, this one good from 21 yards out, for the only points of the first quarter for either team.

After nine plays from scrimmage in the first quarter, the Patriots took a 7–3 lead early in the second quarter on a 4-yard touchdown catch by Moss. After a Gostkowski touchback on the next kickoff, the Colts again drove inside the Patriots’ 10-yard line on 34 receiving yards by Addai on three catches as well as a 40-yard defensive pass interference call against Hobbs. The Patriots’ red-zone defense, that had entered the game ranked last in the NFL, held the Colts to 1 yard on three plays and a 25-yard Vinatieri field goal to make the game 7–6. On the next series, the Patriots drove to the Colts’ 23-yard line before a 15-yard personal foul penalty on Matt Light preceded a Brady interception (the third of the season), this one caught by Antoine Bethea at the Colts’ 2-yard line. With 1:46 remaining in the first half, the Colts moved the ball to their 27-yard line, and with 28 seconds remaining, Peyton Manning threw a screen pass to Addai, who proceeded to run 73 yards for the touchdown, giving the Colts a 13–7 lead at halftime.

For their first two drives of the third quarter, the Patriots were unable to gain a first down and were forced to punt. The Colts fared similarly, with Manning throwing an interception to Rodney Harrison on his first play of the half. On their third possession of the quarter, facing a 3rd and 7 from the Colts’ 41-yard line, Brady scrambled 19 yards for the first down. After catches of 12 and 9 yards from Moss and Kevin Faulk, respectively, the Patriots reached the Colts’ 14-yard line but settled for a 34-yard Gostkowski field goal after Laurence Maroney ran for a 2-yard loss on 3rd and 1. A field goal was, once again, the only points of a quarter for either team; the third quarter ended with the Colts leading 13–10.

After a Colts punt and a Moss 14-yard catch on the first play of the 4th quarter, the Patriots had possession at the Colts’ 42-yard line. On the next play, Brady was intercepted again by linebacker Gary Brackett, who returned it for 28 yards; after another 15-yard penalty from Light, the Colts took possession at the Patriots 32-yard line. Despite Vrabel sacking Manning on the first play of the Colts’ drive, a 17-yard Dallas Clark reception helped set up a 1-yard Manning touchdown run to increase the Colts’ lead to 20–10 with 9:42 remaining in the game. Starting from their own 27-yard line, Brady attempted passes to Moss on the first six plays of the drive. The second attempt was completed for 15 yards, while the fourth attempt went for 55 yards and put the Patriots on the Colts’ 3-yard line. On the fifth attempt, Moss was penalized 10 yards for offensive pass interference in the end zone. After an incompletion to Moss, Brady hit Welker for 10 yards and then again for 3 yards and a touchdown to cut the Colts’ lead to 20–17 with 7:59 remaining. This touchdown also set the Patriots’ record for touchdown passes in a single season, breaking Babe Parilli’s record of 31. After two offensive line penalties by the Colts pushed them back 15 yards, Colvin strip-sacked Manning at the Colts’ 22-yard line, though Colts offensive tackle Charlie Johnson recovered the fumble. After Wes Welker returned the subsequent Colts punt 23 yards to the Patriots’ 49-yard line, a 5-yard pass to Moss and a 33-yard pass to Stallworth set up a 13-yard touchdown catch by Faulk to put the Colts behind 24–20 with 3:15 remaining. That pass made this Brady's ninth consecutive game with at least three touchdown passes, breaking Peyton Manning's record of eight. After a Reggie Wayne 24-yard reception brought the Colts to their own 48-yard line, Green strip-sacked Manning three plays later; Colvin's recovery of that fumble gave the Patriots the ball, and set up a situation where a first down would allow them to win the game. Unlike a similar situation in the 2006 AFC Championship, where the Patriots were forced to punt, the Patriots converted on 3rd and 6 with a 10-yard pass to Welker. Brady took three kneel-down snaps to end the game, leaving the 9–0 Patriots the NFL's only remaining undefeated team heading into their bye week.

=== Week 11: at Buffalo Bills ===
Quarter	1	2	3	4	Total
Patriots	14	21	7	14	56
Bills	7	0	3	0	10

at Ralph Wilson Stadium, Orchard Park, New York

- Game time: 8:15 p.m. EST
- Game weather: 36 °F (2 °C), partly cloudy, chance of snow flurries
- Game attendance: 71,338
- Referee: Bill Carollo
- TV announcers (NBC): Al Michaels (play-by-play), John Madden (color commentator), and Andrea Kremer (sideline reporter)

Following their bye week, the Patriots traveled to Buffalo to play the Bills, who had won 5 of 7 since their 38–7 Week 3 loss to the Patriots. On the first drive of the game, Gay intercepted Losman to give the Patriots the ball at the Bills’ 21-yard line. Two plays later, Maroney ran it in from 6 yards out for a Patriots touchdown. After a Bills punt, the Patriots increased their lead to 14–0 after a 43-yard touchdown reception by Moss from Brady. The touchdown, Moss’ 13th on the season, broke Stanley Morgan’s franchise record of 12 touchdown passes in a single season. On the ensuing drive, a Green strip-sack of Losman was recovered by the Bills, and two plays later, Roscoe Parrish caught a 47-yard touchdown pass for the only Bills touchdown of the game. The Patriots’ next drive went for 72 yards and ended in a 16-yard Moss touchdown reception on the first play of the second quarter. A Bills punt on their next possession gave the Patriots the ball at their own 16-yard line. Aided by catches of 25, 15, 11, and 10 yards by Watson, Welker, Stallworth, and Faulk respectively, the Patriots drove 84 yards in under 7 minutes, capping off the drive with a 6-yard touchdown reception to Moss. That touchdown gave Brady the most career touchdown passes in Patriots franchise history, breaking Steve Grogan’s record of 182. Another Bills punt led to the Patriots’ fifth possession and fifth touchdown of the half, this time a 17-yard Moss touchdown catch ended another 72-yard drive. Moss’ fourth touchdown of the half tied an NFL record for touchdowns for a single player before halftime, and set the Patriots’ franchise record for touchdowns by a player in a game. Adalius Thomas also had 2.5 sacks in the half, setting a single-game career high.

The Patriots began the second half where they left off in the first, driving 73 yards in more than 6 minutes for another touchdown, this one a 3-yard reception by Watson. The Bills responded with a 29-yard Terrence McGee kickoff return that led to a 52-yard Rian Lindell field goal to cut the Patriots lead to 42–10. The Patriots’ next series, their seventh of the game, also ended in their seventh touchdown of the game, setting a Patriots franchise single-season touchdown record (1961 and 1980, 52). A Welker screen pass went 24 yards to put the Patriots in the Bills’ red zone, and a 1-yard Eckel touchdown run on the first play of the fourth quarter gave the Patriots a 49–10 lead. On the second play of the Bills’ next drive, Sanders forced a fumble by running back Dwayne Wright after a 5-yard reception, which Hobbs recovered and returned 35 yards for the Patriots’ eighth and final touchdown of the game. The Patriots’ 56 points tied a franchise record, and were the most points scored by a road team in the NFL since 1973. Their 46-point scoring margin was also the second-largest in team history. The Patriots’ 56–10 win brought their record to 10–0, the tenth time since 1970 a team started a season 10–0.

=== Week 12: vs. Philadelphia Eagles ===
Quarter	1	2	3	4	Total
Eagles	7	14	7	0	28
Patriots	14	10	0	7	31

at Gillette Stadium, Foxborough, Massachusetts

- Game time: 8:15 p.m. EST
- Game weather: 39 °F (4 °C), clear and cold
- Game attendance: 68,756
- Referee: Gene Steratore
- TV announcers (NBC): Al Michaels (play-by-play), John Madden (color commentator), and Andrea Kremer (sideline reporter)

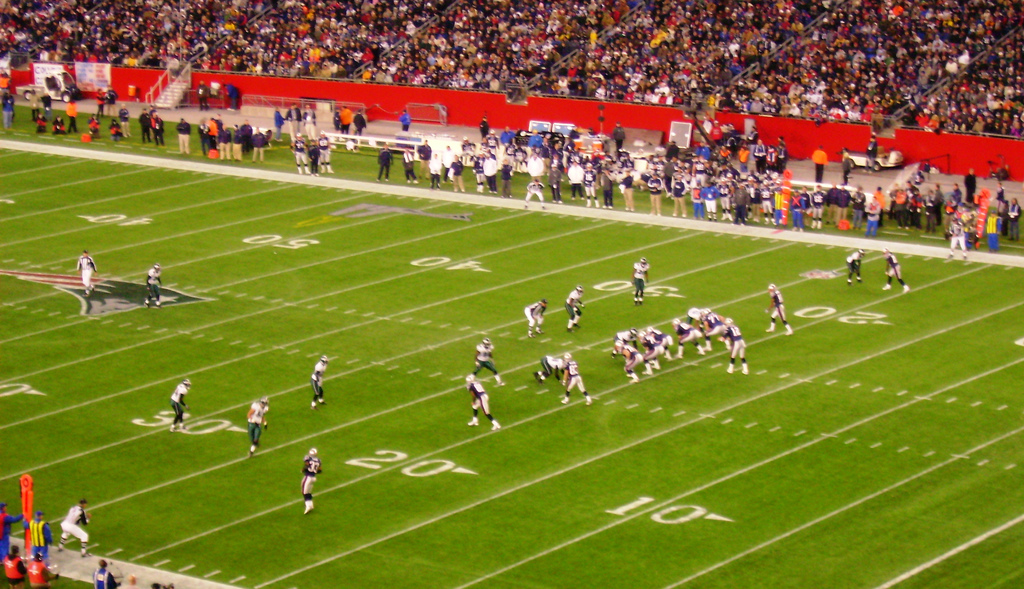
The Patriots playing a spread offense

Due to Buffalo's loss to Jacksonville earlier in the day, the Patriots entered the game against the 5–5 Eagles as AFC East champions for the fifth consecutive season. Their clinch in the 11th game of the season was tied for the earliest in NFL history.

On the first possession of the game, Eagles quarterback A. J. Feeley, starting in place of an injured Donovan McNabb, threw an interception to Samuel, who returned it for a touchdown. On the ensuing drive, the Eagles responded with a 14-play drive capped off by a 1-yard touchdown run by Brian Westbrook; thus, before the Patriots offense had its first possession, the game was tied 7–7. On that possession, Brady threw seven passes, was sacked once, and scrambled for 12 yards, before Evans had a 1-yard touchdown run (the first called run of the game for the Patriots). The Eagles tied the game again on their next possession when wide receiver Greg Lewis caught a 28-yard touchdown pass from Feeley. After a successful onside kick attempt by the Eagles led to a three-and-out drive, the Patriots started at their own 20-yard line and moved the ball all the way to the Eagles’ 11-yard line before the drive stalled and Gostkowski converted a 23-yard field goal. The Eagles responded with another touchdown pass from Feeley to Lewis, this one from 18 yards out, to end a 68-yard drive. With less than 3 minutes to go in the first half the Patriots were trailing the Eagles, 21–17. The Patriots then converted three third downs on their last possession of the half, and Gaffney caught a 19-yard touchdown pass to give the Patriots a halftime lead, 24–21.

After an exchange of punts to begin the second half, Maroney saw his first carries of the game on a drive that appeared to end in a 4-yard Moss touchdown pass before the catch was nullified by an offensive pass interference penalty. The next three plays were incomplete passes by Brady, and on fourth down, Gostkowski missed a 32-yard field goal to keep the score at 24–21 in favor of the Patriots. The Eagles responded with a 10-play, 78-yard drive, retaking the lead on an 8-yard touchdown pass to Reggie Brown. After an unsuccessful fourth down conversion attempt from the Eagles’ 33-yard line, the Patriots defense held the Eagles to a three-and-out, forcing a punt. On a third down in the middle of the Patriots’ next drive, Welker, who finished with 13 catches on the night, caught a 16-yard pass that moved the ball into the Eagles’ red zone. With 7:24 left in the game, Maroney put the Patriots ahead 31–28 with a 4-yard touchdown run. The Eagles moved the ball to the Patriots’ 29-yard line on their next drive, but on 2nd and 4, Feeley was intercepted by Samuel in the end zone with 2:49 remaining in the game. The Patriots, unable to run out the clock, punted, giving the Eagles the ball back with 18 seconds remaining. Feeley's last pass attempt was intercepted by Sanders to seal the Patriots’ eleventh win of the season as they improved to 11–0.

=== Week 13: at Baltimore Ravens ===
Quarter	1	2	3	4	Total
Patriots	3	7	7	10	27
Ravens	7	3	7	7	24

at M&T Bank Stadium, Baltimore, Maryland

- Game time: 8:30 p.m. EST
- Game weather: 40 °F (4 °C), clear
- Game attendance: 71,382
- Referee: Walt Anderson
- TV announcers (ESPN^{[a]}): Mike Tirico (play-by-play), Ron Jaworski and Tony Kornheiser (color commentators), Michele Tafoya and Suzy Kolber (sideline reporters)

For their third night game in as many weeks, the Patriots flew to M&T Bank Stadium to face the 4–7 Ravens. On the first drive of the game, a 42-yard Stallworth reception and three Ravens penalties helped set up a 1st and goal from the Ravens’ 3-yard line. The Patriots next four plays gained a net of zero yards, and Gostkowski kicked a 21-yard field goal to give the Patriots a 3–0 lead. After an exchange of punts, the Ravens took the lead with Kyle Boller completing a 4-yard touchdown pass to Derrick Mason after a 70-yard drive. In the second quarter, Baltimore increased its lead when kicker Matt Stover converted a 29-yard field goal to cap a 12-play, 55-yard drive. On the ensuing drive, the Patriots responded with a 9-play, 60-yard drive that included two more Stallworth receptions and two more Ravens penalties and ended in a 1-yard Evans touchdown run. Two possessions later, with 56 seconds remaining the first half, Brady threw his fifth interception of the season, this one to safety Ed Reed, who proceeded to fumble on the return. Watson recovered the fumble and the Patriots went into halftime in a 10–10 tie.

On the opening drive of the second half, the Ravens drove 73 yards and regained the lead on a 17-yard run by Willis McGahee, his sixth rush of the 8-play drive. The Patriots answered on their next possession with an 11-play, 72-yard drive that included a dump-off pass to Maroney for 36 yards. A 3-yard touchdown pass from Brady to Moss tied the game again at 17–17. In the first minute of the fourth quarter, Baltimore got the lead again, 24–17, as Boller completed a 1-yard touchdown pass to tight end Daniel Wilcox after an 8-play, 56-yard drive. The Patriots went 3-and-out on their next drive, and a 33-yard Yamon Figurs punt return coupled with a 5-yard Pierre Woods penalty gave the Ravens the ball at the Patriots’ 26-yard line with less than 13 minutes remaining in the game. After two McGahee runs for 1 yard and a false start penalty gave the Ravens a 3rd and 14 situation, Boller was intercepted at the Patriots’ 1-yard line by Sanders to hold the Ravens scoreless on the drive. Sanders’ 42-yard return gave the Patriots the ball at their own 43-yard line, and another Maroney dump-off pass for 43 yards brought the Patriots to the Ravens’ 24-yard line. The Patriots then failed to make the first down, and Gostkowski kicked another field goal, this one from 38 yards out, to cut the Ravens’ lead to 24–20. The Patriots defense, which gave up almost 60 first half rushing yards to McGahee, held McGahee to 1 yard on the Ravens’ next drive and forced a 3-and-out. The Patriots’ ensuing drive brought them to the Ravens’ 31-yard line before a 10-yard Dan Koppen penalty and incompletion forced another punt. With less than 6 minutes remaining, the Patriots defense again prevented the Ravens offense from completing a first down and got the ball back with 3:30 left in the game.

Starting from their own 27-yard line, the Patriots got to midfield on the second play of their drive with a 23-yard Watson reception. An incompletion and 9-yard Faulk catch brought 3rd and 1, where Brady rushed for 2 yards and the first down. After the two-minute warning, another 9-yard Faulk catch on 3rd and 10 gave the Patriots a 4th and 1 from the Ravens’ 30-yard line with 1:48 remaining. Brady attempted another sneak and was stopped short of the first, but the play was nullified by a timeout called by Ravens defensive coordinator Rex Ryan just before the snap. Heath Evans lost a yard on the Patriots’ next attempt, but a false start penalty by Russ Hochstein nullified the play and set up a 4th and 6. Brady scrambled for the first down and additionally, Ravens cornerback Samari Rolle was penalized for illegal contact to give the Patriots another 5 yards, moving them to the Ravens’ 18-yard line with 1:38 left on the clock. A 5-yard Faulk rush and two incompletions gave the Patriots another fourth down situation. Brady's throw to Watson in the end zone fell incomplete, but the Patriots again received a fresh set of downs Jamaine Winborne was called for defensive holding. On 1st and goal from the Ravens’ 8-yard line with 55 seconds remaining, the Patriots took their first lead since the first quarter on a Gaffney touchdown reception that was upheld by official review. After the play, Ravens linebacker Bart Scott received two 15-yard unsportsmanlike conduct penalties after throwing an official's flag into the stands, and Reed was flagged for being offsides on the extra point, setting up a Patriots kickoff from the Ravens’ 35-yard line. After a Gostkowski touchback on the kickoff, the Ravens completed two passes, bringing them to their own 45-yard line with 8 seconds remaining. Boller threw a Hail Mary pass that was caught by wide receiver Mark Clayton at the Patriots’ 3-yard line, but he was tackled shy of the end zone as time expired.

The Patriots became the sixth team in NFL history to begin a season 12–0.

=== Week 14: vs. Pittsburgh Steelers ===
Quarter	1	2	3	4	Total
Steelers	3	10	0	0	13
Patriots	7	10	14	3	34

at Gillette Stadium, Foxborough, Massachusetts

- Game time: 4:15 p.m. EST
- Game weather: 34 °F (1 °C), cloudy and cold
- Game attendance: 68,756
- Referee: Terry McAulay
- TV announcers (CBS): Jim Nantz (play-by-play) and Phil Simms (color commentator)

Beginning a stretch of three straight home games, the Patriots faced off against the 9–3 Steelers in their first afternoon game in five weeks. Before the game, Steelers safety Anthony Smith guaranteed a win for the Steelers. After going three-and-out on their first drive, the Patriots fell behind 3–0 early on a 23-yard Jeff Reed field goal to cap an 8-minute, 15-play Steelers possession. A 39-yard Chad Jackson kickoff return gave the Patriots the ball at their own 48-yard line to begin a 9-play drive that ended in a 4-yard Moss touchdown catch to give the Patriots the lead. Moss’ touchdown catch was his 18th of the season, surpassing Curtis Martin for the Patriots’ record for touchdowns by a single player in a season. After a Steelers three-and-out the Patriots, on their first offensive play of the second quarter, increased their lead to 14–3 on a 63-yard play action pass from Brady to Moss. A 30-yard Willie Parker run on the Steelers’ ensuing series set up a 32-yard touchdown pass from Ben Roethlisberger to Najeh Davenport. After a Patriots drive in which a muffed punt recovery by Pittsburgh led to a missed 48-yard field goal attempt by Gostkowski, the Steelers mounted a 12-play drive that lasted almost 6 minutes before a 44-yard Reed field goal cut the Patriots’ lead to 14–13. With 2:29 left in the half, a 32-yard Gaffney reception helped the Patriots drive to the Steelers’ 24-yard line; after two Brady incompletions Gostkowski kicked a 42-yard Gostkowski field goal, giving the Patriots a 17–13 lead at halftime.

On the Patriots’ first drive of the second half, on 1st and 10 from their own 44-yard line, after a Brady lateral pass to Moss fell short, Moss picked it up and threw it back to Brady, who then found Gaffney deep for a 56-yard touchdown. After another Steelers three-and-out, the Patriots’ second possession of the half also went for a touchdown, as a 2-yard Welker reception capped a 10-play drive that included one run, a 4-yard Brady scramble. In the opening minutes of the fourth quarter, the Steelers moved the ball to the Patriots’ 1-yard line, but failed to score on 3rd and goal and 4th and goal. The Patriots took the ball at their own 1-yard line and then began a 6-minute, 12 play drive, passing on every down. Using a no-huddle offense, Welker caught five straight passes to bring the Patriots to the Steelers’ 36-yard line. Brady completed four more passes to set up first-and-goal from the Steelers’ 10-yard line, but his next three passes were all incomplete, leading to a 28-yard Gostkowski field goal. The Steelers’ next possession, a 13-play drive, ended in another failed fourth down conversion. After a Patriots punt, the Steelers ran the ball three times to give the Patriots their 13th win of the season; with the win, the Patriots improved to 13–0 and also clinched a first-round playoff bye.

=== Week 15: vs. New York Jets ===
Quarter	1	2	3	4	Total
Jets	0	7	0	3	10
Patriots	7	10	0	3	20

at Gillette Stadium, Foxborough, Massachusetts

- Game time: 1:00 p.m. EST
- Game weather: 36 °F (2 °C), rain
- Game attendance: 68,756
- Referee: Jerome Boger
- TV announcers (CBS): Jim Nantz (play-by-play) and Phil Simms (color commentator)

Coming off their win over the Steelers, the Patriots stayed at home for an AFC East rematch with the 3–10 Jets. The Patriots punted on their first drive of the game, giving the Jets the ball at their own 3-yard line. After a 1-yard Thomas Jones run, Jets quarterback Clemens threw an interception to Eugene Wilson, who returned it for a touchdown. Clemens was hit by Seymour and suffered an ankle injury on the play and did not return to the game. Wilson also became the Patriots’ 21st player to score a touchdown on the season, tying an NFL record set by the Denver Broncos in 2000 and the Los Angeles Rams in 1987. On their ensuing possession, the Jets gained 49 yards on an option play to running back Leon Washington, but then failed a fourth down conversion from the Patriots’ 17-yard line. With 6:36 remaining in the first quarter, the Patriots began a drive that ended 17 plays later, in the 2nd quarter, on a 26-yard Gostkowski field goal. After a Jets punt, the Patriots moved the ball to their own 40-yard line when a Chris Hanson punt attempt was blocked by David Bowens and returned for a touchdown to cut the Patriots’ lead to 10–7. On the Jets’ next possession, Washington blocked a Graham punt attempt to give the Patriots the ball at the Jets’ 3-yard line. A 1-yard Maroney touchdown run a play later gave the Patriots a 17–7 lead going into halftime. Gostkowski's extra point, his 67th of the season, broke Uwe von Schamann’s single-season record of 66 with the Miami Dolphins in 1984.

A Jets punt gave the Patriots the ball at their own 9-yard line early in the third quarter. After two Maroney rushes for a total of 5 yards, a Brady pass on third down intended to Moss was intercepted by Jets cornerback Darrelle Revis. The Jets moved into the red zone, but were driven back on a Thomas Jones run for a 1-yard loss and a delay of game penalty. On third down, Pennington completed a 10-yard pass to Baker, who then fumbled. Wilson recovered it for the Patriots, but a subsequent exchange of punts kept the third quarter scoreless. Another Hanson punt began the fourth quarter, giving the Jets the ball from their own 15-yard line. The Jets then embarked upon a 17-play drive where Pennington completed 10 passes on 12 attempts, none for more than 14 yards. The drive ended at the Patriots’ 15-yard line, where the Jets cut the Patriots’ lead to 17–10 on a 33-yard Mike Nugent field goal. The Patriots’ ensuing drive began with two incompletions intended for Moss. On third down, Brady completed a 16-yard pass to Moss, and then a 46-yard pass to Moss to give the Patriots the ball at the Jets’ 14-yard line. A 4-yard Maroney run, incompletion, and sack for a loss of 6 yards set up a 33-yard Gostkowski field goal. The Jets’ next possession ended in a 35-yard missed Nugent field goal, and the Jets failed to score on their final drive to give the Patriots a 20–10 win. It gave the Patriots a 14–0 record, tying with the 1972 Miami Dolphins as the best record to start a season. The win also clinched home-field advantage for the Patriots throughout the playoffs.

=== Week 16: vs. Miami Dolphins ===
Quarter	1	2	3	4	Total
Dolphins	0	0	7	0	7
Patriots	7	21	0	0	28

at Gillette Stadium, Foxborough, Massachusetts

- Game time: 4:15 p.m. EST
- Game weather: 43 °F (6 °C), cloudy and mild with rain expected
- Game attendance: 68,756
- Referee: Ron Winter
- TV announcers (CBS): Jim Nantz (play-by-play) and Phil Simms (color commentator)

Playing their third consecutive home game, the Patriots tried to improve their record to 15–0 against the 1–13 Dolphins. For the first time of the season, 15-year wide receiver Troy Brown was active; he saw action early in the game, returning a Dolphins punt on their first drive 10 yards. The Patriots’ second first down of their first possession was their 349th of the season, breaking their 1994 franchise record. Six plays later, Brady connected with Moss for an 11-yard touchdown and a 7–0 Patriots lead. After three punts, the Patriots’ third drive of the game began on the final play of the first quarter, a 51-yard Maroney rush to give the Patriots the ball at the Dolphins’ 28-yard line. After a successful third-down conversion, Brady threw his second touchdown pass of the game to Moss from a yard out to give the Patriots a 14–0 lead. The Dolphins’ punted again on their next drive, and the Patriots opened up a 21-point lead with a 59-yard Maroney touchdown run while also setting the franchise record for net yards on a season, breaking the record of 5,965 set in 1978. After the Dolphins’ fourth three-and-out of the game, a 38-yard Brandon Fields punt was muffed by Troy Brown and recovered by the Dolphins, who punted again three plays later. After moving the ball from their own 20-yard line to the Dolphins’ 48-yard line, Brady completed a 48-yard touchdown pass to Gaffney on the Patriots’ 71st touchdown of the season, breaking the NFL record of 70 set by the 1984 Dolphins. The Dolphins drove the Patriots’ 4-yard line with 21 seconds remaining in the half, but Tedy Bruschi batted down a Lemon pass on fourth down intended for Justin Peelle to preserve the Patriots’ 28–0 lead heading into halftime.

On the opening drive of the second half, Welker caught his 101st pass of the season, tying the Patriots’ individual franchise record Brown set in 2001. On the next play, Brady was intercepted by Jason Allen the end zone on a pass intended for Moss. After a 22-yard Chatman rush began the Dolphins’ ensuing drive, the Dolphins punted for the seventh time three plays later. On third down from their own 28-yard line, Brady threw his second interception of the game, this time picked off by linebacker Derrick Pope on a pass also intended for Moss. The Dolphins moved the ball on their next drive from their own 46-yard line to the Patriots’ 1-yard line, where Lemon scrambled out of bounds short of the end zone on 4th and goal. The Dolphins challenged the ruling, which was upheld after review. The play gave the Patriots the ball from their own 1-yard line, where a three-and-out set up a 64-yard Hanson punt from the end zone, his longest of the season. A 22-yard Lorenzo Booker rush on the Dolphins’ next possession helped bring the Dolphins’ to the Patriots 21-yard line, where Lemon connected with Greg Camarillo to cut the Patriots lead to 28–7. The Patriots committed their fourth turnover of the game when Brady was strip-sacked by Joey Porter to give the Dolphins the ball at their own 28-yard line. Four punts and a scoreless fourth quarter later, the Patriots picked up their 15th win of the season as they improved to 15–0 and became the first 15–0 team in NFL history.

The Patriots’ 15th win matched the win totals of the 2004 Pittsburgh Steelers, 1998 Minnesota Vikings, 1985 Chicago Bears, and 1984 San Francisco 49ers, while their 15–0 regular season start was a first in NFL history. The Patriots’ 6–0 record against division opponents was a franchise first. The win also marked the Patriots’ 18th straight regular season victory since their December 2006 loss to the Dolphins, tying the Patriots’ 2003–2004 NFL record.

=== Week 17: at New York Giants ===
Quarter	1	2	3	4	Total
Patriots	3	13	7	15	38
Giants	7	14	7	7	35

at Giants Stadium, East Rutherford, New Jersey

- Game time: 8:15 p.m. EST
- Game weather: 44 °F (7 °C), clear
- Game attendance: 79,110
- Referee: Mike Carey
- TV announcers (NFLN^{[a]}^{[b]}): Bryant Gumbel (play-by-play), Cris Collinsworth (color commentator), and Adam Schefter (sideline reporter)

In their final regular season game, the 15–0 Patriots traveled to Giants Stadium, trying to win a record 16th game of the season. With the game scheduled to air on NFL Network, not available on some cable providers, the NFL arranged a three-way simulcast of the game with CBS and NBC, the first time an NFL game was broadcast on three networks, and the first national simulcast of any NFL game since Super Bowl I. The New York and Boston television markets both had a fourth channel, a local television station in each respective market covering the game. In the week leading up to the game, the NFL Network aired a record 65.5 hours of game-specific coverage, including a six-hour pregame special which matched the longest NFL pregame show, including for a Super Bowl, on a single network.

The game was of very little importance with respect to the playoffs as both teams had already locked up their respective spots in the playoffs, with the Patriots in the AFC's #1 seed and the Giants in the NFC's #5 seed. The Patriots had already clinched a first-round bye and home-field advantage through the playoffs while the Giants were guaranteed to play the Tampa Bay Buccaneers in the wild card playoffs. Nevertheless, the Patriots were attempting to become the first team since the NFL's expansion to a 16-game regular season schedule to go undefeated and thus the game became the most heavily promoted game in the history of the NFL to that point and the most watched regular season game ever to that point.

On the second play of the game, the 10–5 Giants moved into the Patriots’ red zone on a 52-yard completion from Eli Manning to Plaxico Burress. Three plays later, The Giants took the lead on a 7-yard touchdown pass to Brandon Jacobs. The Patriots responded with a pair of 14-yard completions to Moss and Welker; Welker's catch, his 102nd of the season, set a Patriots franchise record. The Patriots then converted a fourth down, and on their next fourth down, they made a 37-yard Gostkowski field goal. The Patriots would regain the ball at midfield following a Giants three-and-out. Completions to Stallworth and Welker put the Patriots in the Giants’ red zone, where Brady completed a 4-yard touchdown pass to Moss, taking a 10–7 lead on the first play of the second quarter. On the play, three records were affected: the Patriots 560th point surpassed the 1998 Minnesota Vikings's record of 556 points in a season; the touchdown pass was Brady's 49th, tying Peyton Manning's 2004 record; and Moss recorded his 22nd touchdown catch of the season, tying Jerry Rice’s 1987 record.

As a result of a 15-yard penalty for unsportsmanlike conduct after the touchdown, the Patriots kicked off from the 15-yard line. Giants wide receiver Domenik Hixon received it from the Giants’ 26-yard line and proceeded to run for a 74-yard touchdown return, retaking the lead for the Giants. Starting from their own 33-yard line, the Patriots moved into Giants territory on a 13-yard Maroney rush and 8-yard Faulk reception. Brady's 8 passing yards on the play gave him 4,557 for the season, breaking Drew Bledsoe’s 1994 franchise record of 4,555 yards. After the drive stalled, Gostkowski's recorded his second field goal for the game, making the score 14–13 in favor of the Giants. Following a Giants punt, the Patriots mounted a drive that resulted in Gostkowski's third field goal of the night, from 37 yards, after a 3rd down end zone pass to Moss ricocheted off of linebacker Gerris Wilkinson's helmet. With 1:54 remaining the half and the Giants trailing 16–14, Manning completed five of his first seven passes to move from the Giants’ 15-yard line to the Patriots’ 3-yard line. On second down with 18 seconds remaining, Manning threw his second touchdown pass of the game, this time to Boss, to take a 21–16 lead at the half.

After the Patriots began the second half with a three-and-out, the Giants increased their lead to 12 points on a 19-yard touchdown catch by Burress from Manning. Facing their largest deficit of the season, the Patriots drove to the Giants’ 16-yard line with several Brady completions. A pass interference call against the Giants’ Wilkinson gave the Patriots the ball at the Giants’ 1-yard line. After an illegal formation penalty moved the Patriots back 5 yards, a 6-yard Maroney touchdown run cut the Giants’ lead to 28–23. Three consecutive drives resulted in punts, and the Patriots gained possession of the ball with less than 12 minutes remaining in the game.

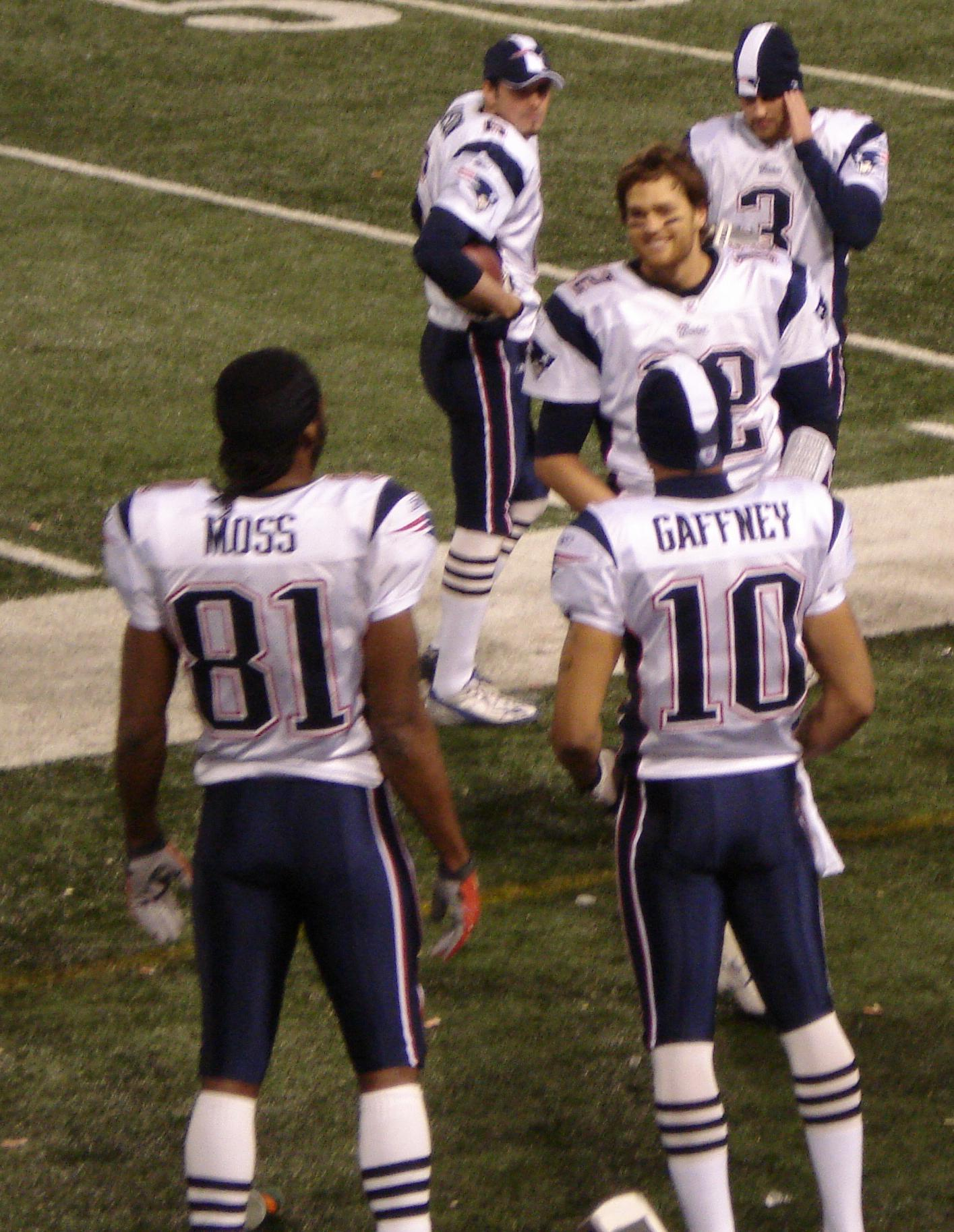
Tom Brady on the sideline with teammates Randy Moss and Jabar Gaffney, after throwing for his record-breaking 50th passing touchdown of the season.

On the second play of the drive, Brady attempted a deep pass to Moss, which was underthrown and dropped. On the next play, Brady attempted another deep pass to Moss, who caught this one for 65 yards, setting two more NFL records: Moss set the record for most touchdown receptions in a season (23) and Brady set one for touchdown passes (50). The touchdown, Brady's last of the game, also brought Brady's touchdown-to-interception margin to +42; Peyton Manning held the previous record, +39 during the 2003–2004 season. This also brought Brady's touchdown-to-interception ratio to 6.25:1, another NFL record. Brady himself would shatter his own record three years later. The Patriots converted the subsequent two-point attempt, their only two-point conversion attempt of the season, on a Maroney rush to take a 31–28 lead with 11:15 remaining. On the Giants’ ensuing drive, Hobbs intercepted a Manning pass intended for Burress at the Patriots’ 48-yard line. After driving to the red zone, a 5-yard catch by Moss marked his 1,493rd reception yard for the season, breaking Stanley Morgan's 1986 franchise record of 1,491 yards. On the subsequent play, Maroney scored his second touchdown of the game on a 5-yard run to give the Patriots a 38–28 lead. With 4:36 left in the game, the Giants drove the ball to the Patriots’ 4-yard line, and two plays later, Manning completed a 3-yard touchdown pass to Burress, Manning's fourth for the game. After the Patriots’ Vrabel recovered the Giants’ onside kickoff, the Patriots knelt thrice to end the game as they finished the regular season 16–0.

The Patriots’ joined the 14–0 1972 Miami Dolphins, 11–0 1942 Chicago Bears, and 13–0 1934 Chicago Bears as the fourth team to record an undefeated regular season in the NFL. (Note: The 1948 Cleveland Browns were 14–0 in the All-America Football Conference, an accomplishment recognized by the Pro Football Hall of Fame, but not by the NFL.) The Pats also set a record for most regular season wins in a single season. The victory was the Patriots’ 19th consecutive regular season victory, breaking their own record set during the 2003–2004 season. Finally, the Patriots finished the season with a +315 point differential, breaking the 1942 Bears’ record of +292.

==== Network television coverage ====
The NFL Network had exclusive rights to broadcast the Patriots-Giants game, and in the weeks before the game, the network increasingly promoted the game via television commercials on other stations. It was clear the game was one of the most anticipated of the season, and could therefore serve as an important promotion for the NFL Network, which had tried unsuccessfully over the previous year to expand its viewership by becoming included as an “extended basic service” on the major American cable television providers such as Comcast and Time Warner Cable.

Political pressure from the Northeast to make the game more widely viewable preceded the decision to simulcast the game on CBS and NBC. Arlen Specter, the Pennsylvania senator who was the Republican ranking member on the Senate Judiciary Committee, and Patrick Leahy of Vermont, the committee's head, wrote the league a letter threatening to reconsider the antitrust exemption currently enjoyed by the NFL under United States law. Senator John Kerry of Massachusetts had pressured the league and cable companies to settle their dispute so “no die-hard Pats fans will be shut out from watching their team take aim at football history."

In the end, 15.7 million viewers watched the game on CBS, 13.2 million on NBC, 4.5 million on the NFL Network, and 1.2 million on New York, Boston and Manchester, New Hampshire television stations. The game was the most watched program on television since the 2007 Academy Awards and the most watched regular season NFL game in more than 12 years.

In addition to NFL Network, CBS, and NBC, the game also aired on the local stations that were originally given exclusive simulcasting rights, including WCVB-TV in Boston, WMUR-TV in Manchester, NH, and WWOR-TV in New York City.

The game's impact was summarized by Scott Graham on NFL Films' subsequent hour-long replay of the contest ("Perfect Ending", an episode of NFL Films Game Of The Week): “Never had a meaningless game carried more meaning."

== Standings ==
AFC East
	W	L	T	PCT	DIV	CONF	PF	PA	STK
^{(1)} New England Patriots	16	0	0	1.000	6–0	12–0	589	274	W16
Buffalo Bills	7	9	0	.438	4–2	6–6	252	354	L3
New York Jets	4	12	0	.250	2–4	4–8	268	355	W1
Miami Dolphins	1	15	0	.063	0–6	1–11	267	437	L2

=== Standings breakdown ===
	W	L	Pct.	PF	PA
Home	8	0	1.000	275	103
Away	8	0	1.000	314	171
AFC East Opponents	6	0	1.000	229	76
AFC Opponents	12	0	1.000	420	177
NFC Opponents	4	0	1.000	169	97
By Stadium Type
Indoors	2	0	1.000	72	47
Outdoors	14	0	1.000	517	227

== Postseason schedule ==
Playoff round	Date	Opponent (seed)	Result	Record	Venue	Recap
Wild Card	First-round bye					
Divisional	January 12, 2008	Jacksonville Jaguars (5)	W 31–20	1–0	Gillette Stadium	Recap
AFC Championship	January 20, 2008	San Diego Chargers (3)	W 21–12	2–0	Gillette Stadium	Recap
Super Bowl XLII	February 3, 2008	New York Giants (N5)	L 14–17	2–1	University of Phoenix Stadium	Recap

== Postseason results ==
=== Divisional Playoffs: vs. (5) Jacksonville Jaguars ===
AFC Divisional Playoffs: (5) Jacksonville Jaguars at (1) New England Patriots – Game summary

Quarter	1	2	3	4	Total
Jaguars	7	7	3	3	20
Patriots	7	7	14	3	31

at Gillette Stadium, Foxborough, Massachusetts

- Game time: 8:00 p.m. EST
- Game weather: 37 °F (3 °C), cloudy and cool
- Game attendance: 68,756
- Referee: Jerome Boger
- TV announcers (CBS): Jim Nantz (play-by-play) and Phil Simms (color commentator)

Game information
First quarter
- JAX – Matt Jones 8 yard pass from David Garrard (Josh Scobee kick), 10:50. Jaguars 7–0. Drive: 9 plays, 80 yards, 4:10.
- NE – Benjamin Watson 3 yard pass from Tom Brady (Stephen Gostkowski kick), 5:01. Tied 7–7. Drive: 10 plays, 74 yards, 5:49.

Second quarter

- NE – Laurence Maroney 1 yard run (Stephen Gostkowski kick), 14:57. Patriots 14–7. Drive: 7 plays, 29 yards, 3:33.
- JAX – Ernest Wilford 6 yard pass from David Garrard (Josh Scobee kick), 7:46. Tied 14–14. Drive: 11 plays, 95 yards, 7:11.

Third quarter

- NE – Wes Welker 6 yard pass from Tom Brady (Stephen Gostkowski kick), 8:49. Patriots 21–14. Drive: 11 plays, 82 yards, 6:11.
- JAX – Josh Scobee 39 yard field goal, 4:04. Patriots 21–17. Drive: 9 plays, 48 yards, 4:45.
- NE – Ben Watson 9 yard pass from Tom Brady (Stephen Gostkowski kick), 0:49. Patriots 28–17. Drive: 6 plays, 76 yards, 3:15.

Fourth quarter

- JAX – Josh Scobee 25 yard field goal, 9:44. Patriots 28–20. Drive: 13 plays, 86 yards, 6:05.
- NE – Stephen Gostkowski 35 yard field goal, 6:39. Patriots 31–20. Drive: 6 plays, 63 yards, 3:05.

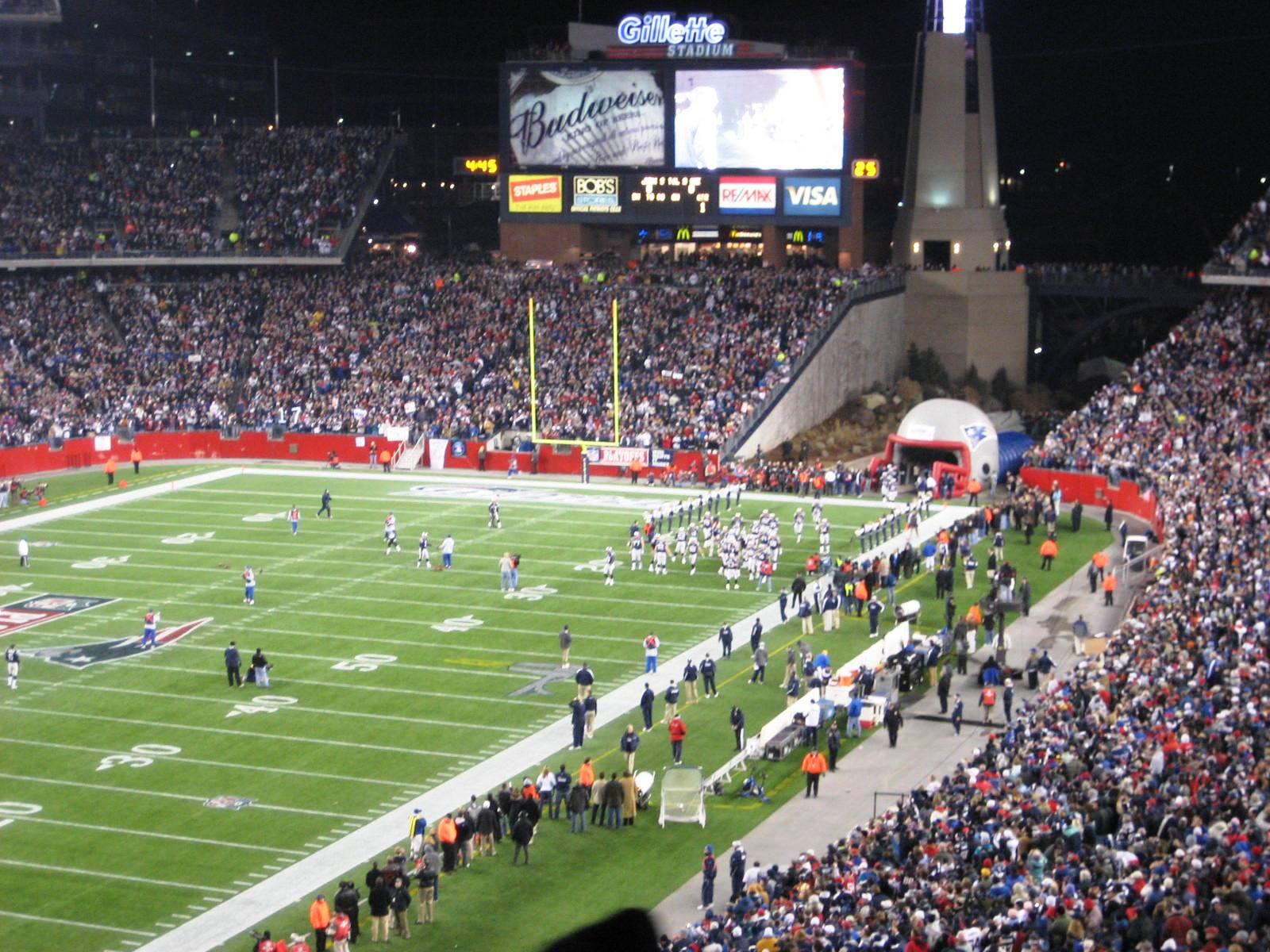
The Patriots entering the field

Playing in his first playoff game as a Patriot, Randy Moss, who led the NFL in receiving yards, had one reception. Patriots quarterback Tom Brady set the NFL record for completion percentage in a single game (92.9%) with 26 of 28 completions for 263 yards and 3 touchdowns, while running back Laurence Maroney added 162 total yards (122 on the ground). Overall, New England gained 401 yards and didn't punt the ball until 31 seconds remained in the fourth quarter.

Jacksonville took the opening kickoff and went 80 yards in 9 plays, featuring two receptions by Marcedes Lewis for 57 yards, on the way to David Garrard's 9-yard touchdown pass to Matt Jones. The Patriots then went on a 74-yard drive and scored with Tom Brady’s 3-yard touchdown pass to Benjamin Watson. On Jacksonville's next possession, New England lineman Ty Warren forced a fumble while sacking Garrard, and linebacker Mike Vrabel recovered it at the Jaguars 29-yard line. Several plays later, Maroney scored a 1-yard touchdown run to give New England a 14–7 lead.

Jaguars running back Maurice Jones-Drew muffed the ensuing kickoff and was downed at his own 5-yard line. The Jaguars then moved the ball 95 yards in 11 plays without facing a third down and scoring with Garrard's 6-yard touchdown pass to Ernest Wilford. For the third time in a row, New England drove deep into Jacksonville territory. But this time the drive stalled at the 17-yard line and ended with no points when Stephen Gostkowski missed a 35-yard field goal with 53 seconds left in the first half.

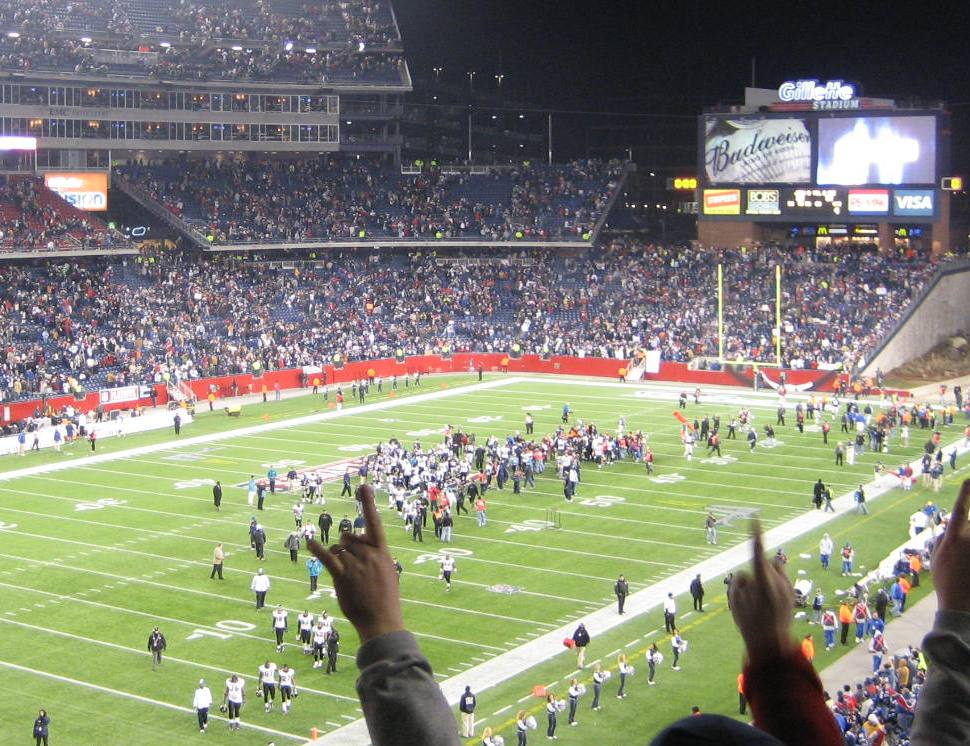
The Patriots on the field after their victory

On the opening drive of the second half, Brady completed 7 of 8 passes for 54 yards on an 82-yard drive. On the last play, he took a snap in shotgun formation with Kevin Faulk to his right, Brady jumped in the air with his arms raised to make it look like a play used by the Patriots before where Faulk took the direct snap. The Jaguars defense followed Faulk, leaving Wes Welker open in the end zone, and Brady threw him the ball for a touchdown to give the Patriots a 21–14 lead. Jacksonville responded with a drive to the New England 21-yard line, but receiver Dennis Northcutt dropped a pass on third down, forcing them to settle for a Josh Scobee 39-yard field goal, cutting the score to 21–17. On New England's next drive, Jacksonville's Derek Landri was assessed a roughing-the-passer penalty, turning Welker's 6-yard catch into a 21-yard gain. Maroney gained 40 yards with his next two carries, and following two more Welker receptions, Brady threw a 9-yard touchdown pass to Watson giving New England a 28–17 lead.

An unnecessary roughness penalty and a 25-yard reception by Reggie Williams on the Jacksonville's next drive set up a 25-yard field goal by Scobee, which cut the Jaguars deficit to one touchdown, 28–20. On the second play after the kickoff, Brady completed a 52-yard strike to Donté Stallworth, setting up Gostkowski's second field goal attempt to put New England back up by two scores, 31–20.

Then, with 3:46 left in the game, Pats safety Rodney Harrison, intercepted a pass from Garrard at the Patriots’ 31-yard line, ending any hope of a Jacksonville comeback. Harrison's interception was his 7th career postseason pick, a Patriots record. This was also his fourth consecutive postseason game with an interception, tying an NFL record held by Aeneas Williams.

With this win, the Patriots advanced to the AFC title game for the second year in a row and extended their perfect record to 17–0, matching the final record of the 1972 Miami Dolphins.

=== AFC Championship: vs. (3) San Diego Chargers ===
AFC Championship: (3) San Diego Chargers at (1) New England Patriots – Game summary

Quarter	1	2	3	4	Total
Chargers	3	6	3	0	12
Patriots	0	14	0	7	21

at Gillette Stadium, Foxborough, Massachusetts

- Game time: 3:00 p.m. EST
- Game weather: 23 °F (−5 °C), partly cloudy, windy and cold
- Game attendance: 68,756
- Referee: Jeff Triplette
- TV announcers (CBS): Jim Nantz (play-by-play), Phil Simms (color commentator) and Steve Tasker (sideline reporter)

Game information
First quarter
- SD – Nate Kaeding 26 yard field goal, 2:55. Chargers 3–0. Drive: 7 plays, 32 yards, 2:12.

Second quarter

- NE – Laurence Maroney 1 yard run (Stephen Gostkowski kick), 13:48. Patriots 7–3. Drive: 10 plays, 65 yards, 4:07.
- SD – Nate Kaeding 23 yard field goal, 9:14. Patriots 7–6. Drive: 9 plays, 65 yards, 4:34.
- NE – Jabar Gaffney 12 yard pass from Tom Brady (Stephen Gostkowski kick), 3:51. Patriots 14–6. Drive: 2 plays, 24 yards, 0:45.
- SD – Nate Kaeding 40 yard field goal, 0:08. Patriots 14–9. Drive: 6 plays, 43 yards, 1:38.

Third quarter

- SD – Nate Kaeding 24 yard field goal, 8:36. Patriots 14–12. Drive: 8 plays, 43 yards, 3:56.

Fourth quarter

- NE – Wes Welker 6 yard pass from Tom Brady (Stephen Gostkowski kick), 12:15. Patriots 21–12. Drive: 8 plays, 67 yards, 4:17.

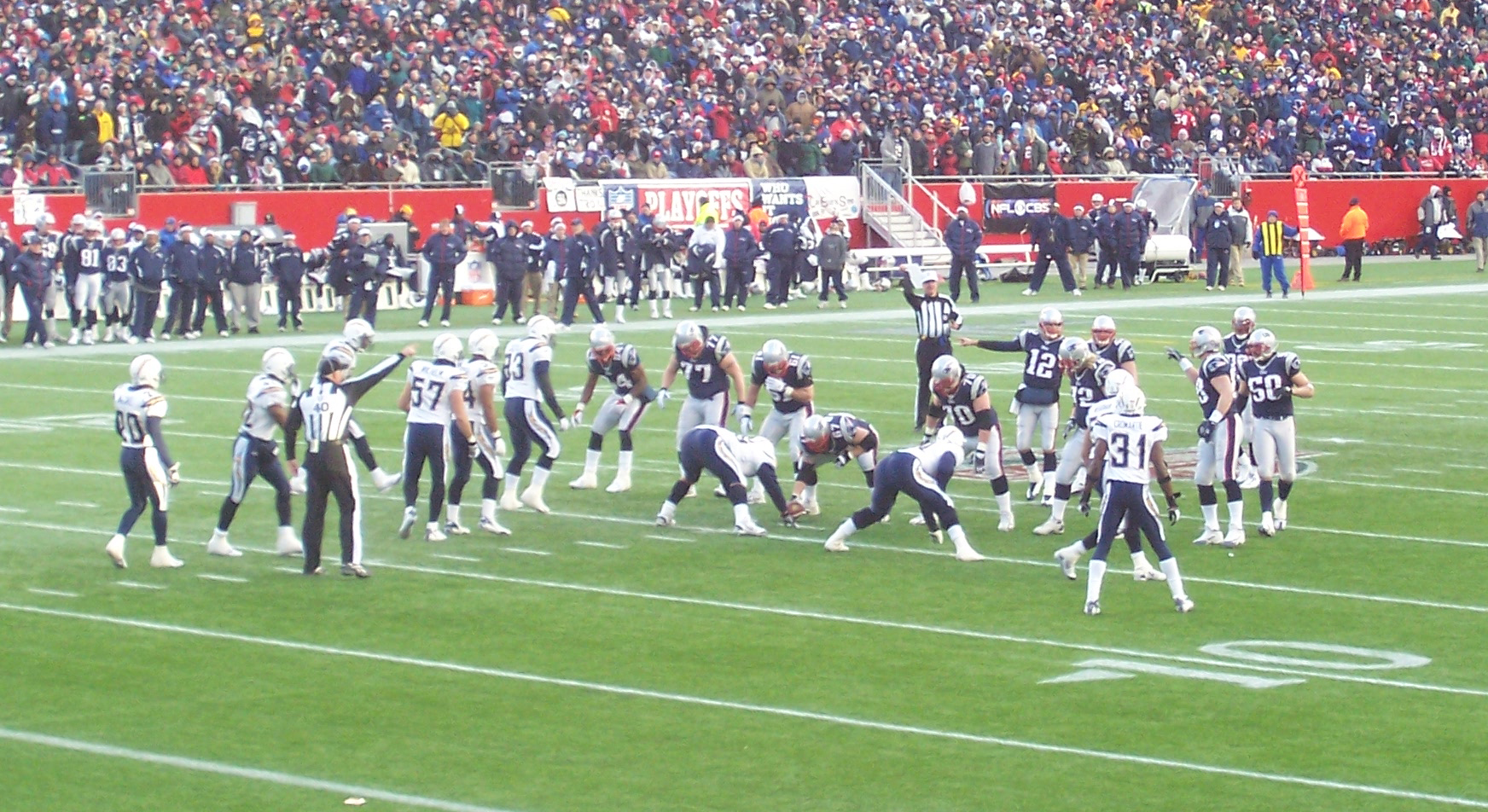
The Patriots’ offense on the field

Despite 3 interceptions from Tom Brady, the Patriots still managed to defeat San Diego, holding them to four field goals while Laurence Maroney rushed for 122 yards and a touchdown for the second game in a row. With this win, the Patriots became the first NFL team to start with an 18–0 record and advanced to their fourth Super Bowl appearance in seven years.

With just over 5 minutes left in the first quarter Quentin Jammer intercepted a pass from Brady on the Patriots 40-yard line, setting up a 26-yard field goal by Nate Kaeding. New England responded by driving 65 yards and scoring with a 1-yard Maroney touchdown run to take a 7–3 lead.

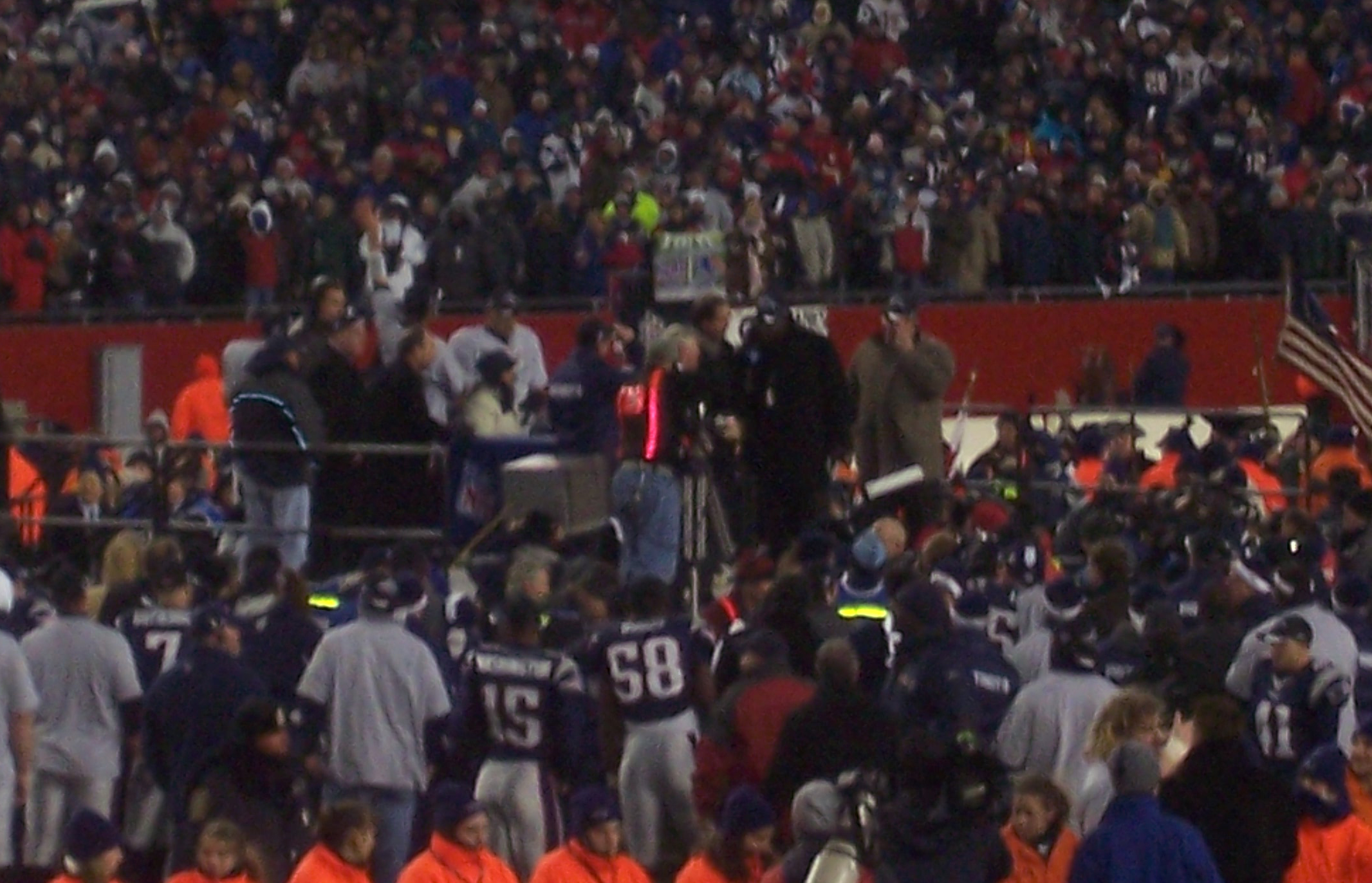
Andre Tippett presents Robert Kraft with the Lamar Hunt trophy

Kaeding kicked a 23-yard field goal in the second quarter to cut the score to 7–6, but after a punt, Asante Samuel intercepted a pass from Philip Rivers and returned it 10 yards to the Chargers 24-yard line. One play later, Brady's 12-yard touchdown pass to Jabar Gaffney increased their lead to 14–6. Later on, a 26-yard run by Darren Sproles moved the ball to the New England 34-yard line. But once again, the Patriots defense kept San Diego out of the end zone, stopping them on 3rd and 1 and forcing them to settle for another Kaeding field goal, making the score 14–9 at halftime.

On the opening drive of the second half, Brady threw his second interception of the game, this one to Drayton Florence at the New England 49-yard line. San Diego then moved the ball to the 4-yard line, but on 3rd and 1, linebacker Junior Seau tackled Michael Turner for a 2-yard loss and the Chargers had to settle for Kaeding's fourth field goal. New England responded with a drive to the San Diego 2-yard line, with Maroney gaining 39 yards on four running plays, but Chargers cornerback Antonio Cromartie ended the drive by intercepting Brady in the end zone.

On their first drive of the fourth quarter, New England moved the ball 67 yards and scored with Brady's 6-yard touchdown pass to Wes Welker, making the score 21–12. Following a Chargers punt, the Patriots ended the game with a 15-play drive that took the final 9:13 off the game clock. The Patriots’ overall record then improved to 18–0 en route to their appearance in Super Bowl 42 and becoming the 2007 AFC Champions.

=== Super Bowl XLII vs. New York Giants ===
Super Bowl XLII: (N5) New York Giants vs. (A1) New England Patriots – Game summary

Quarter	1	2	3	4	Total
Giants	3	0	0	14	17
Patriots	0	7	0	7	14

at University of Phoenix Stadium, Phoenix, Arizona

- Game time: 6:30 p.m. EST/4:30 p.m. MST
- Game weather: Played with roof closed, retractable roof stadium
- Game attendance: 71,101
- Referee: Mike Carey
- TV announcers (Fox): Joe Buck (play-by-play), Troy Aikman (color commentator), Pam Oliver and Chris Myers (sideline reporters)

Game information
First quarter
- NYG – Lawrence Tynes 32-yard field goal, 5:01. Giants 3–0. Drive: 16 plays, 63 yards, 9:59.

Second quarter

- NE – Laurence Maroney 1-yard run (Stephen Gostkowski kick), 14:57. Patriots 7–3. Drive: 12 plays, 56 yards, 5:04

Third quarter

- No scoring plays

Fourth quarter

- NYG – David Tyree 5-yard pass from Eli Manning (Lawrence Tynes kick), 11:05. Giants 10–7 Drive: 6 plays, 80 yards, 3:47
- NE – Randy Moss 6-yard pass from Tom Brady (Stephen Gostkowski kick), 2:42. Patriots 14–10 Drive: 12 plays, 80 yards in 5:15
- NYG – Plaxico Burress 13-yard pass from Eli Manning (Lawrence Tynes kick), 0:35. Giants 17–14 Drive: 12 plays, 83 yards in 2:07

The Patriots’ opponents in the Super Bowl would be the Giants, a rematch of the regular season finale. After scoring a combined 73 points in their regular season meeting, the teams scored only a mere 10 points by the end of the third quarter, with the Patriots leading 7 to 3. The Patriots’ record-setting offense gave up five sacks and one lost fumble, while the Giants’ offense managed only five first downs in the second and third quarters. Yet in the fourth quarter, quarterback Eli Manning led two go-ahead touchdown drives, including the winning drive that culminated with a 17-yard touchdown to Plaxico Burress with 39 seconds remaining. The game marked the first time that a previously undefeated team had lost in a National Football League championship game since the 1942 Chicago Bears as the Patriots fell to 18–1 on the season. The Patriots were also the second team to enter the Super Bowl undefeated, joining the 1972 Miami Dolphins, who reached Super Bowl VII with a 16–0 record and won to become the first and to date only NFL team to win the league championship after going all the way through the regular season and playoffs undefeated and untied, but were the first undefeated and untied team to fail to win the Super Bowl.

After calling tails to win the coin toss, the Giants started the game with the longest opening drive in Super Bowl history, a 16-play, 77-yard march that consumed 9 minutes, 59 seconds and featured four third-down conversions, the most ever on a Super Bowl opening drive. But New England halted the drive at their own 14-yard line, forcing the Giants to settle for a 32-yard field goal from Lawrence Tynes that gave New York a 3–0 lead.

New England then responded with its own scoring drive as Laurence Maroney returned the kickoff 43 yards to the Patriots’ 44-yard line, after which he rushed twice for 15 yards. Quarterback Tom Brady then completed three passes for 23 yards, but after two incomplete passes, New England was faced with 3rd-and-10 on the Giants’ 17. However, on that play, New York linebacker Antonio Pierce committed pass interference by striking the helmet of tight end Benjamin Watson in the end zone, giving New England 1st-and-goal at the 1. This set up a Maroney 1-yard touchdown run two plays later, the first play of the second quarter, for a 7–3 lead. The two teams each only had one drive in the entire opening quarter, a Super Bowl record.

On the Giants first drive of the second quarter, on 3rd-and-7, receiver Amani Toomer caught in a deep pass from Manning along the left sideline while dragging his feet in-bounds for a 38-yard gain, moving the ball to the Patriots’ 19. But three plays later, Manning threw a pass that bounced out of the arms of rookie receiver Steve Smith and into the hands of cornerback Ellis Hobbs for an interception.

The Patriots’ ensuing drive resulted in a three-and-out as on 3rd-and-1 James Butler and Michael Strahan tackled Maroney for a two-yard loss and New England was forced to punt.

Then on the Giants’ next drive, rookie running back Ahmad Bradshaw fumbled a Manning hand-off and it looked as though Patriots’ linebacker Pierre Woods had recovered the ball at the Giants’ 30. But after the officials picked through the pile, it was determined that Bradshaw had made the recovery. The Giants maintained possession and wound up punting. New England's next drive ended with consecutive Giants’ sacks, the first by linebacker Kawika Mitchell, the second by tackle Justin Tuck.

On the Giants’ following drive, New York moved the ball to the New England 25, but linebacker Adalius Thomas sacked Manning and forced a fumble. Smith recovered the ball, however Bradshaw was penalized for illegally batting the ball forward before the recovery. The penalty pushed the Giants out of field goal range, and following an incompletion, they were forced to punt.

After the punt, two 18-yard receptions by Moss and Donté Stallworth moved the ball to the Giants’ 44. But with 22 seconds left before halftime, Brady fumbled while being sacked by Tuck and defensive end Osi Umenyiora recovered the ball. The game then went to halftime with the Patriots leading 7–3.

On the first drive of the second half, New England had a 4th-and-2 and chose to punt. However, after the play had been run, Patriots’ head coach Bill Belichick challenged that New York had too many players on the field and replay confirmed that was the case as Giants linebacker Chase Blackburn was unable to get to the sidelines as the ball was being snapped. Therefore, referee Mike Carey reversed the play, and the Giants were penalized 5 yards for having too many players on the field, giving the Patriots a first down. The Patriots then drove to the Giants’ 25, but Strahan sacked Brady for a 6-yard loss on third down. Then on 4th-and-13, with the ball on the Giants’ 31, Belichick decided against a long field goal attempt by Stephen Gostkowski and tried to pick up a first down instead. Brady's pass to Jabar Gaffney was incomplete as it went out of the back of the end zone and the Giants took over on downs.

On the Giants’ first drive of the fourth quarter, Manning completed a 45-yard pass to rookie tight end Kevin Boss. Following three runs by Bradshaw and a 17-yard reception by Smith on third down, Manning finished the 7-play, 80-yard drive with a 5-yard touchdown pass to David Tyree, giving New York a 10–7 lead with 11:10 left in the game.

After consecutive three-and-outs by the Patriots and Giants, New England got the ball at its own 20 with 7:54 to play. Brady then completed a 5-yard pass to Wes Welker and a 10-yard pass to Moss, followed by a 9-yard run by Maroney to give the Patriots a first down at their own 44. Brady followed with a 13-yard pass to Welker, a four-yard completion to Kevin Faulk, and then a 10-yard pass to Welker for a first down at the Giants’ 29. After that, Brady found Moss for an 11-yard completion and Faulk for a 12-yard completion and New England now had 1st-and-goal from the Giants’ 6. Following two incomplete passes, New York cornerback Corey Webster slipped while backing into coverage, leaving Moss wide open in the end zone where Brady found him for a touchdown to give New England a 14–10 lead with 2:42 left in the game.

On the ensuing kickoff, Ray Ventrone tackled Domenik Hixon after a 14-yard return, giving New York the ball on their own 17 with 2:39 left and three timeouts remaining. Following two receptions by Toomer for 20 yards, Brandon Jacobs kept the drive going with a 2-yard run on 4th-and-1. On the next series of downs, Patriots’ cornerback Asante Samuel nearly caught a possibly game-ending interception on a ball intended for Tyree, but the ball slipped through his fingertips. On the next play, the Giants faced 3rd-and-5 from their own 44 with 1:15 remaining. Manning spun out of the grasp of lineman Jarvis Green, righted himself, and threw a 32-yard completion to Tyree, who made a leaping catch while covered by Rodney Harrison and maintained possession by pinning the ball against his helmet with one hand as he fell to the ground. Two plays later, on 3rd-and-11, Manning found a wide-open Smith for a 12-yard gain to the New England 13. On the next play, the Giants sent four receivers into the pattern while the Patriots sent six pass rushers after Manning and flipped four pass defenders to the right side of the field – resulting in Patriots’ cornerback Ellis Hobbs being isolated on the left side to cover Giants’ wide receiver Plaxico Burress one-on-one. Rodney Harrison tried to adjust the unbalanced formation but his fellow defenders, including Junior Seau, were eager to sack Manning and the defense was left unchanged. Hobbs bit on a fake slant inside (a “slant-and-go” or “SluGo” route) and Manning lofted a pass to the end zone where Burress caught the ball for a touchdown to complete the 12-play, 83-yard drive and give Giants a 17–14 lead with 35 seconds left.

New England began its next possession on its own 26 with 29 seconds remaining and three timeouts, but the Giants’ defense didn't allow a single yard—forcing an incompletion on first down, a 10-yard sack by rookie defensive tackle Jay Alford on second down, and then two deep incomplete attempts to Moss, the first that was broken up by Webster, and the second of which, on 4th-and-20, was broken up by Giants’ safety Gibril Wilson and caused a turnover on downs with one second remaining. After the incompletion, the game clock briefly read zero (one second was re-added), and coaches, players, reporters, and fans crowded the field as if the game had ended. Belichick hugged Giants’ Coach Tom Coughlin at midfield, then an official explained to both coaches that the final second had to be run. The Patriots’ defense took the field, and Belichick left for the locker room, not staying for the final play. This early departure was later criticized by some sportswriters who felt Belichick was being a sore loser, while others noted that he had properly congratulated Coughlin (they also noted Coughlin was one of the few opposing coaches he didn't loathe) and that the game was over once the Patriots failed to convert on 4th down.

The officials cleared the field, and restarted the clock. Manning took a knee, allowing the clock to expire, and consequently won Super Bowl XLII for the Giants, while also ending the Patriots’ prospects of a 19–0 season as their overall record dropped to 18–1. With the loss, the Patriots’ Super Bowl record dropped to 3–3. They matched the 1984 San Francisco 49ers & the 1985 Chicago Bears, who both won the Super Bowl in their respective seasons.

Six days before the game, the Boston Globe offered a book for presale documenting the Patriots’ 19–0 “historic championship season”. Following the Patriots’ loss, the book was cancelled.

== Final roster ==
2007 New England Patriots roster
Quarterbacks (QB): 12 Tom Brady; 16 Matt Cassel; 7 Matt Gutierrez; Running backs (RB): 38 Kyle Eckel FB; 44 Heath Evans FB; 33 Kevin Faulk; 39 Laurence Maroney; Wide receivers (WR): 80 Troy Brown PR; 10 Jabar Gaffney; 17 Chad Jackson; 81 Randy Moss; 18 Donté Stallworth; 15 Kelley Washington; 83 Wes Welker; Tight ends (TE): 88 Kyle Brady; 82 Stephen Spach; 84 Ben Watson	Offensive linemen (OL): 65 Wesley Britt T; 71 Russ Hochstein C/G; 77 Nick Kaczur T; 67 Dan Koppen C; 72 Matt Light T; 70 Logan Mankins G; 61 Stephen Neal G; 68 Ryan O'Callaghan T; 74 Billy Yates G; Defensive linemen (DL): 97 Jarvis Green DE; 95 Rashad Moore NT; 93 Richard Seymour DE; 90 Le Kevin Smith NT; 92 Santonio Thomas DE; 94 Ty Warren DE; 75 Vince Wilfork NT	Linebackers (LB): 52 Eric Alexander ILB; 54 Tedy Bruschi ILB; 53 Larry Izzo OLB; 55 Junior Seau ILB; 96 Adalius Thomas LB; 50 Mike Vrabel OLB; 58 Pierre Woods OLB; Defensive backs (DB): 23 Willie Andrews; 21 Randall Gay CB; 37 Rodney Harrison SS; 27 Ellis Hobbs CB/KR; 31 Brandon Meriweather SS; 22 Asante Samuel CB; 36 James Sanders S; 28 Antwain Spann CB; 41 Raymond Ventrone FS; 26 Eugene Wilson FS; Special teams (ST): 3 Stephen Gostkowski K; 6 Chris Hanson P; 66 Lonie Paxton LS	Practice squad: 48 Kyle Bissinger OLB; 13 Bam Childress WR; 63 Dan Connolly G; 19 C. J. Jones WR; 25 Tim Mixon CB; 85 Jason Rader TE; 42 Gemara Williams CB; Reserve: 59 Rosevelt Colvin LB (IR); 49 Oscar Lua LB (IR); 24 Mel Mitchell SS (IR); 34 Sammy Morris RB (IR); 35 Mike Richardson CB (IR); 30 Chad Scott CB (IR); 86 David Thomas TE (IR); 99 Mike Wright DE (IR); Rookies in italics 53 active, 8 reserve, 7 practice squad

== Awards and honors ==
Bill Belichick, and numerous players, were the recipients of awards for their performances in the 2007 regular season:

Recipient	Award(s)
Bill Belichick	Week 6: Motorola NFL Coach of the Week; Week 17: Motorola NFL Coach of the Week; 2007 Associated Press NFL Coach of the Year
Tom Brady	Week 3: AFC Offensive Player of the Week; September: AFC Offensive Player of the Month; Week 6: AFC Offensive Player of the Week; Week 6: FedEx Express NFL Player of the Week; Week 7: AFC Offensive Player of the Week; Week 7: FedEx Express NFL Player of the Week; October: AFC Offensive Player of the Month; Week 11: FedEx Express NFL Player of the Week; Week 14: AFC Offensive Player of the Week; Week 17: AFC Offensive Player of the Week; 2007 Sporting News Sportsman of the Year; 2007 Associated Press Male Athlete of the Year; 2007 Associated Press NFL MVP^{[a]} 2007 Associated Press NFL Offensive Player of the Year^{[b]}
Ellis Hobbs	Week 1: AFC Special Teams Player of the Week
Randy Moss	Week 9: AFC Offensive Player of the Week; Week 11: AFC Offensive Player of the Week; November: AFC Offensive Player of the Month
Stephen Neal	2007 New England Patriots Ed Block Courage Award
Asante Samuel	Week 12: AFC Defensive Player of the Week
Mike Vrabel	Week 8: AFC Defensive Player of the Week; Week 8: GMC NFL Defensive Player of the Week
Ty Warren	2007 New England Patriots Ron Burton Community Service Award
Wes Welker	2007 New England Patriots 12th Player Award

Notes

- ^{a} Brady received 49 of 50 votes; Brett Favre received the other vote.
- ^{b} Patriots players received 49 of 50 votes: Brady earned 35.5, Randy Moss 12.5, and Wes Welker 1 (the remaining vote went to Brett Favre).

=== Pro Bowl and All-Pro selections ===
Eight Patriots were elected to the 2008 Pro Bowl, the most since 1985. Quarterback Tom Brady, offensive tackle Matt Light, guard Logan Mankins, wide receiver Randy Moss, cornerback Asante Samuel, linebacker Mike Vrabel, and defensive tackle Vince Wilfork were all named as starters, while center Dan Koppen was named as a reserve.

Of those eight, five—Brady, Light, Moss, Samuel, and Vrabel—were selected to the NFL's All-Pro first team with Moss being a unanimous selection, and Brady receiving all but one-half vote (the other half was given to Brett Favre). Wilfork, Mankins, Koppen, and wide receiver Wes Welker were named to the second team.

== NFL and franchise records set ==
The 2007 New England Patriots tied or broke many NFL and franchise records.

=== Team ===
==== NFL records ====
- Most games won, Regular Season: 16
- Fewest games lost, Regular Season: 0 (tied with the 1972 Miami Dolphins)
- Most games won, Regular and Post Season: 18 (tied with the 1985 Chicago Bears and 1984 San Francisco 49ers)
- Longest winning streak, Season: 16
- Longest winning streak, Regular and Post Season: 18
- Most Points, Season: 589 (surpassed by the 2013 Denver Broncos)
- Most Points on the Road, Season: 314
- Most Games Scoring 30+ Points, Season: 12 (surpassed by the 2013 Denver Broncos)
- Highest Point Differential, Season: +315
- Most First Downs, Season: 391 (surpassed by the 2012 New England Patriots)
- Touchdowns Scored, Season: 75 (surpassed by the 2013 Denver Broncos)
- Most consecutive games with a 20-point margin of victory, to start season: 4
- Most Consecutive Games Won, Start of Season: 16
- Most Consecutive Games Won, End of Season: 16
- Most Consecutive Regular Season Games Won: 19 (surpassed by the 2008 New England Patriots and 2009 Indianapolis Colts)

==== Franchise Records ====
- Most points scored, Game: 56 (tied with the 1979 New England Patriots, surpassed by the 2009 New England Patriots)

=== Tom Brady ===
- Most passing touchdowns, Season: 50 (surpassed by Peyton Manning in 2013)

=== Randy Moss ===
- Most receiving touchdowns, Season: 23

=== Wes Welker ===
- Most receptions in a Super Bowl: 11 (surpassed by James White in Super Bowl LI)
