= Clint Oldenburg =

American football player (born 1983)

No. 76, 68, 73
- Position: Offensive tackle

Personal information
- Born: September 9, 1983 (age 43); Sheridan, Wyoming, U.S.
- Listed height: 6 ft 5 in (1.96 m)
- Listed weight: 305 lb (138 kg)

Career information
- High school: Campbell County (Gillette, Wyoming)
- College: Colorado State
- NFL draft: 2007: 5th round, 171st overall pick

Career history
- New England Patriots (2007)*; New York Jets (2007); St. Louis Rams (2008)*; Denver Broncos (2008)*; Minnesota Vikings (2009)*; Washington Redskins (2009–2010); Virginia Destroyers (2011); Saskatchewan Roughriders (2012)*
- * Offseason or practice squad member only

Awards and highlights
- UFL champion (2011); Second-team All-MW (2006)

Career NFL statistics
- Games played: 2
- Stats at Pro Football Reference

Clint Steven Oldenburg (born September 9, 1983) is an American former professional football player who was an offensive tackle in the National Football League (NFL). He was selected by the New England Patriots in the fifth round of the 2007 NFL draft. He played college football for the Colorado State Rams.

Oldenburg was also a member of the New York Jets, St. Louis Rams, Denver Broncos, Minnesota Vikings, Washington Redskins, Virginia Destroyers and Saskatchewan Roughriders. Following his playing career, he began working as a game designer at Electronic Arts on the Madden NFL video game series.

== Early life ==
Oldenburg was born in Sheridan, Wyoming. He graduated from Campbell County High School in Gillette, Wyoming, in 2002, where he was awarded the annual Milward L. Simpson Athletic Award.

== Professional career ==
=== Pre-draft ===
Oldenburg measured in at 6'5" 300 pounds at the NFL Combine.

At his Pro Day, he ran a 5.26 40 yard dash (1.77 10 yard split) with a 4.74 20 yard shuttle and 8.19 3 cone time. He also had a 30" vertical and 8'5" broad jump.

=== New England Patriots ===
He was selected in the fifth round of the 2007 NFL draft by the New England Patriots. After being cut, he signed with the New York Jets for the 2007 & 2008 seasons. In 2008, he also landed with the St. Louis Rams and Denver Broncos before going to the Minnesota Vikings in 2009 and Washington Redskins in 2010.

=== Washington Redskins ===
He was released from the Redskins roster on September 4, 2011.

=== Saskatchewan Roughriders ===
On April 19, 2012, Oldenburg was released by the Saskatchewan Roughriders of the Canadian Football League.
