= Chris Dunlap =

American gridiron football player (born 1985)

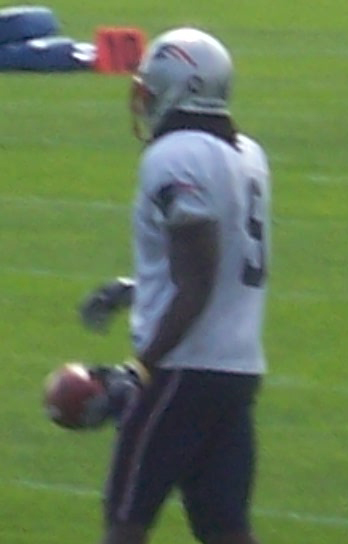

No. 9, 87
- Position: Wide receiver

Personal information
- Born: November 16, 1985 (age 40); Miramar, Florida, U.S
- Listed height: 5 ft 11 in (1.80 m)
- Listed weight: 200 lb (91 kg)

Career information
- High school: Miramar (FL)
- College: Georgia Tech
- NFL draft: 2007: undrafted

Career history
- New England Patriots (2007–2008)*; Montreal Alouettes (2008)*
- * Offseason or practice squad member only
- Stats at CFL.ca (archive)

Christopher Denard Dunlap (born November 16, 1985) is a former American and Canadian football wide receiver. He was signed by the New England Patriots as an undrafted free agent in 2007. He played college football at Georgia Tech.

Dunlap was also a member of the Montreal Alouettes.

== Professional career ==
=== New England Patriots ===
Dunlap was signed by the New England Patriots as an undrafted free agent in 2007, but was released prior to the regular season. He was re-signed on July 21, 2008 but waived on August 14.

=== Montreal Alouettes ===
On September 26, 2008, Dunlap was signed to the practice squad of the Montreal Alouettes. He was re-signed for the 2009 season on December 12, 2008. However, he was released on March 17, 2009.
