= Justise Hairston =

American football player (born 1983)

No. 43, 25, 27
- Position: Running back

Personal information
- Born: June 27, 1983 (age 43); New Britain, Connecticut, U.S.
- Listed height: 6 ft 2 in (1.88 m)
- Listed weight: 220 lb (100 kg)

Career information
- High school: New Britain; Milford Academy
- College: Rutgers (2003-2005); Central Connecticut (2006)
- NFL draft: 2007: 6th round, 208th overall pick

Career history
- New England Patriots (2007); Indianapolis Colts (2007–2008)*; Buffalo Bills (2009)*
- * Offseason or practice squad member only

Justise Hairston (born June 27, 1983) is an American former professional football running back in the National Football League (NFL). He played college football for the Central Connecticut Blue Devils and was selected by the New England Patriots in the sixth round of the 2007 NFL draft.

== College career ==
Hairston attended Rutgers University for three seasons. He was a backup for the Scarlet Knights while playing there before transferring to CCSU. With CCSU in 2006, Hairston set a school record for the most rushing yards in a season with over 1,800. He was also the second player from CCSU ever drafted by an NFL team.

=== Awards and honors ===
- ECAC All-Star (2006)
- AFCA I-AA All-American (2006)
- Third-team AP All-American (2006)
- Walter Payton Award finalist (2006)

== Professional career ==
=== New England Patriots ===
Hairston was drafted by the New England Patriots in the sixth round (208th overall) of the 2007 NFL draft. On August 1, 2007, Hairston was waived/injured by the Patriots, cleared waivers, and was placed on injured reserve. He reached an injury settlement with the team and was released on September 11.

=== Indianapolis Colts ===
On October 4, 2007, Hairston was signed to the practice squad of the Indianapolis Colts. Later in October he was released by the Colts. He was re-signed by the Colts after the season but was waived again by the team on June 16, 2008.

=== Buffalo Bills ===
Hairston was signed by the Buffalo Bills on June 8, 2009. On July 29, 2009, he was waived by the Bills.
