= 2007 New England Patriots–New York Giants game =

Notable 2007 NFL game

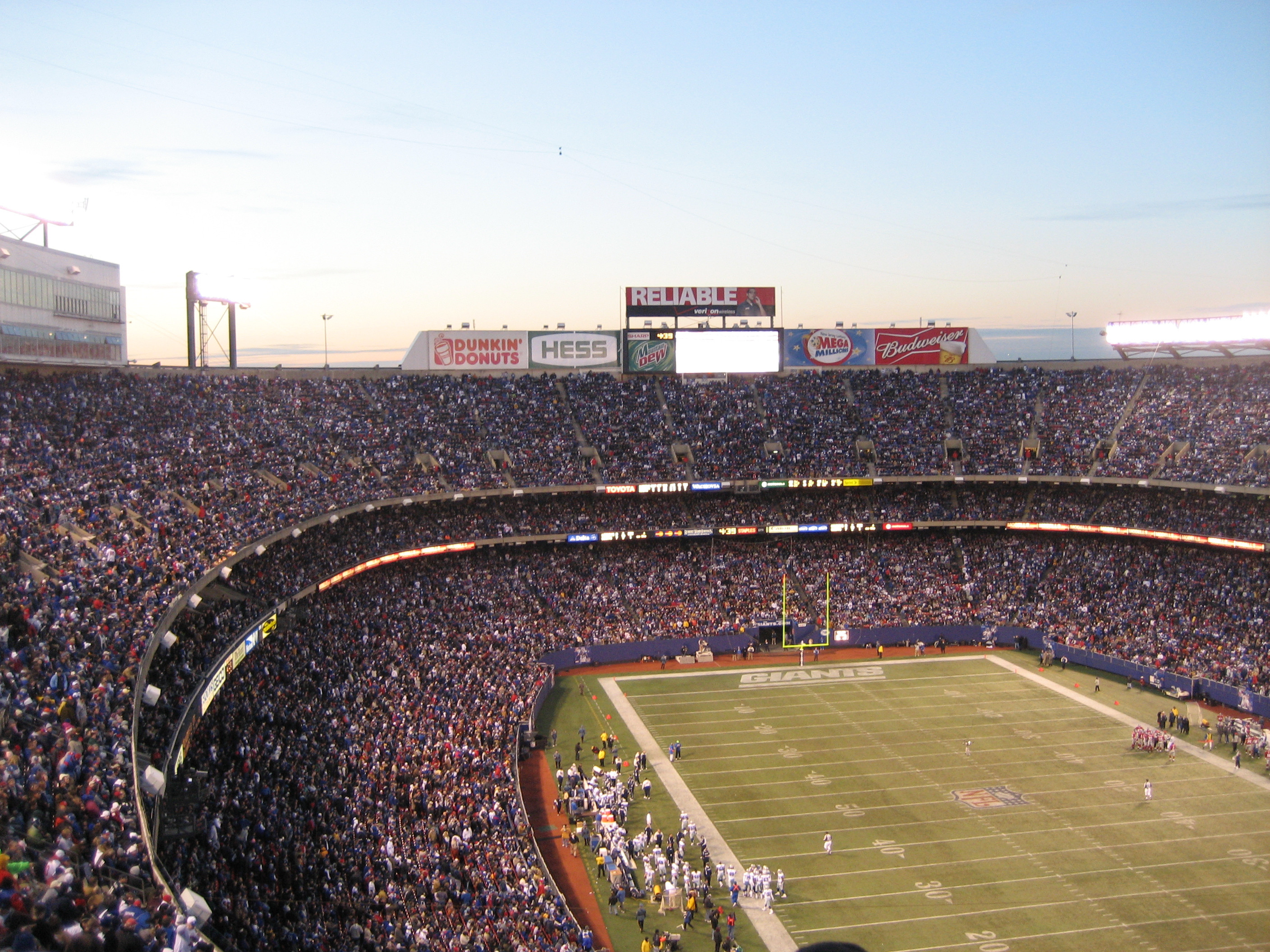
- Giants Stadium (seen in 2006)
New England Patriots (15–0)	New York Giants (10–5)
38	35
Head coach: Bill Belichick	Head coach: Tom Coughlin
	1	2	3	4	Total
NE	3	13	7	15	38
NYG	7	14	7	7	35
- Date: December 29, 2007
- Stadium: Giants Stadium; East Rutherford, New Jersey
- Favorite: Patriots by 13
- Referee: Mike Carey
- Attendance: 79,110

TV in the United States
- Network: NFL Network, NBC*, and CBS*; *Game was simulcast
- Announcers: Bryant Gumbel and Cris Collinsworth

On December 29, 2007, during the final week of the 2007 season, the New England Patriots defeated the New York Giants, 38–35, at Giants Stadium in East Rutherford, New Jersey. In what became a preview of Super Bowl XLII, the game was a close comeback win for the Patriots, giving them the first undefeated regular season since the 1972 Miami Dolphins, the only undefeated regular season since the league expanded to 16 games, and the only undefeated 16 game season as the NFL season was expanded to 17 games in 2021.

The game was originally notable for its television coverage as it was officially broadcast and produced by NFL Network but was also simulcast nationally on both NBC and CBS. This was despite the game originally being planned to be aired exclusively on NFL Network. The decision to also simulcast the game on NBC and CBS occurred due to the high anticipation for the game, political pressure from the Northeast to make the game more widely viewable, and also because NBC was the primary broadcast network for Sunday night games, while CBS in 2007 normally held the rights to air games when the away team was an AFC team. The teams would later meet in Super Bowl XLII, in which the Giants won 17–14, ending the Patriots' hopes of a perfect season.

== Network television coverage ==
When the NFL announced its 2007 regular season schedule, the game was scheduled to air exclusively on the NFL Network, as was the case with all Saturday NFL games beginning with the 2006 television contract in an attempt to boost carriage of the NFL Network by cable providers.

The game was also offered to local stations in each team's home market under a long-standing league policy for games televised on cable networks. In the case of the Patriots–Giants game, the local rights were originally sold to WCVB-TV and WMUR-TV (both ABC affiliates owned by Hearst-Argyle Television) in the Boston / Manchester market, and MyNetworkTV owned-and-operated station WWOR-TV in the New York City market.

It was a prime time matchup of regional rivals, but as the Patriots moved closer to a perfect season, the game became even more important. Therefore, the NFL Network increasingly promoted the game via television commercials on other stations. It was clear the game was one of the most anticipated in recent history, and could therefore serve as an important promotion for the NFL Network, which had tried unsuccessfully over the previous year to expand its viewership by becoming included as an "extended basic service" on the major American cable television providers such as Comcast and Time Warner Cable.

Political pressure from the Northeast to make the game more widely viewable preceded the decision to simulcast the game on CBS and NBC. (NBC was the primary broadcast network for Sunday night games, while in 2007 CBS normally held the rights to air games when the away team was an AFC team.) The Senate Judiciary Committee's chairperson, Democrat Patrick Leahy of Vermont, and ranking minority member, Republican Arlen Specter of Pennsylvania, sent a letter to the NFL threatening to reconsider the league's antitrust exemption under U.S. law. Senator John Kerry of Massachusetts had pressured the league and cable companies to settle their dispute so "no die-hard Pats fans will be shut out from watching their team take aim at football history."

In the end, 15.7 million viewers watched the game on CBS, 13.2 million on NBC, 4.5 million on the NFL Network, and 1.2 million on the aforementioned local stations in New York, Boston, and Manchester. The game was the most watched program on television since the 2007 Academy Awards and the most watched regular season NFL game in more than 12 years. It marked the first time that an NFL game was simulcast on two or more networks on a national level since Super Bowl I, which aired on CBS and NBC, the respective homes of the NFL and the American Football League (AFL) at the time.

The broadcast was a complete production of the NFL Network, and because the NFL Network had a unique opportunity to promote its brand by being simulcast on network television, several unusual events occurred during the broadcast. First, CBS and NBC did not air their usual studio shows leading up to the game. Instead, the networks came on the air at 8:00 eastern time and simulcast the final 15 minutes of the NFL Network's 6+ hour pregame show. The NFL Network used that time mostly to promote the channel and its programming, encouraging viewers who did not receive NFL Network to call their television providers and ask for it. A "demo reel" of NFL Network programs aired during the simulcast portion of the pregame as well. This demo reel and the encouragement to call television providers were repeated on the halftime and postgame reports, also NFL Network produced. During the game itself, several on-screen graphics were shown encouraging viewers to both call their television provider and go to the NFL's "Get NFL Network" website to send automated emails to television providers.

Moreover, the NFL Network, which had devoted over 30 hours of programming in the week prior to the Patriots-Colts game in Week 9, devoted over 60 hours of programming to the game, consisting primarily of re-broadcasts of nine Patriots games from the 2007 season; they also had a special countdown clock for the game which appeared over 1,000 times in the week leading up to the game, and live coverage of Patriots press conferences that week. Moreover, NFL Network aired a six-hour pregame show devoted to the game; no NFL game, including Super Bowls, had received more coverage.

In Canada, TSN held the rights to the game, as it did for all NFL Network regular-season telecasts. After the NBC / CBS simulcast was announced, TSN's parent broadcast network CTV announced it too would carry the game, allowing CTV simultaneous substitution rights over U.S. stations broadcasting the game. This meant that, in areas of eastern Canada receiving their "big three" network affiliates from Boston, the CTV signal was seen on four different basic-cable channels, in addition to TSN's broadcast (which only differed from CTV in terms of network identification and some commercials).

This controversy did not lead to the NFL offering the Thursday Night Football package to other networks, and so the games remained exclusively on NFL Network through 2013. The Thanksgiving night game, which was part of the package until 2011, was sold to NBC beginning in the 2012 season. On February 5, 2014, it was announced that CBS would air eight, early-season Thursday night games during the 2014 NFL season in simulcast with NFL Network, with the remainder airing on NFL Network exclusively.

== Game summary ==
2007 Week Seventeen: New England Patriots at New York Giants – Game Summary

Quarter	1	2	3	4	Total
Patriots	3	13	7	15	38
Giants	7	14	7	7	35

at Giants Stadium, East Rutherford, New Jersey

- Date: December 29, 2007
- Game time: 8:15 p.m. EDT
- Game weather: 44 °F (6.7 °C), Clear
- Game attendance: 79,110
- Referee: Mike Carey
- TV announcers (NFL Network, simulcast on CBS and NBC): Bryant Gumbel and Cris Collinsworth
- Boxscore

Game information

First quarter

- NYG - Brandon Jacobs 7-yard pass from Eli Manning (Lawrence Tynes kick), 10:59. Giants 7-0. Drive: 7 plays, 74 yards, 4:01.
- NE - Stephen Gostkowski 37-yard field goal, 5:19. Giants 7-3. Drive: 12 plays, 54 yards, 5:40.

Second quarter

- NE - Randy Moss 4-yard pass from Tom Brady (Stephen Gostkowski kick), 14:55. Patriots 10-7. Drive: 8 plays, 50 yards, 4:01.
- NYG - Domenik Hixon 74-yard kickoff return (Lawrence Tynes kick), 14:44. Giants 14-10. Drive: 0 plays, 0 yards, 0:11.
- NE - Stephen Gostkowski 45-yard field goal, 9:59. Giants 14-13. Drive: 8 plays, 39 yards, 4:45.
- NE - Stephen Gostkowski 37-yard field goal, 1:59. Patriots 16-14. Drive: 11 plays, 61 yards, 5:41.
- NYG - Kevin Boss 3-yard pass from Eli Manning (Lawrence Tynes kick), 0:13. Giants 21-16. Drive: 8 plays, 85 yards, 1:46.

Third quarter

- NYG - Plaxico Burress 19-yard pass from Eli Manning (Lawrence Tynes kick), 9:12. Giants 28-16. Drive: 7 plays, 60 yards, 4:10.
- NE - Laurence Maroney 6-yard run (Stephen Gostkowski kick), 4:00. Giants 28-23. Drive: 8 plays, 73 yards, 5:12.

Fourth quarter

- NE - Randy Moss 65-yard pass from Tom Brady (Laurence Maroney run), 11:06. Patriots 31-28. Drive: 3 plays, 65 yards, 0:23.
- NE - Laurence Maroney 5-yard run (Stephen Gostkowski kick), 4:36. Patriots 38-28. Drive: 9 plays, 52 yards, 5:17.
- NYG - Plaxico Burress 3-yard pass from Eli Manning (Lawrence Tynes kick), 1:04. Patriots 38-35. Drive: 11 plays, 68 yards, 3:32.

Top passers

- NE – Tom Brady – 32/42, 356 yards, 2 TD
- NYG – Eli Manning – 22/32, 251 yards, 4 TD, INT

Top rushers

- NE – Laurence Maroney – 19 carries, 46 yards, 2 TD
- NYG – Brandon Jacobs – 15 carries, 67 yards

Top receivers

- NE – Wes Welker – 11 receptions, 122 yards
- NYG – Plaxico Burress – 4 receptions, 84 yards, 2 TD

=== First quarter ===
In their final regular season game, the 15–0 Patriots traveled to Giants Stadium, trying to win a record 16th game of the season. With the game scheduled to air on NFL Network, not available on some cable providers, the NFL arranged a three-way simulcast of the game with CBS and NBC, the first time an NFL game was broadcast on three networks, and the first national simulcast of any NFL game since Super Bowl I. The New York and Boston television markets both had a fourth channel, a local television station in each respective market covering the game. In the week leading up to the game, the NFL Network aired a record 65.5 hours of game-specific coverage, including a six-hour pregame special which matched the longest NFL pregame show, including for a Super Bowl, on a single network.

On the second play of the game, the 10–5 Giants moved into the Patriots' red zone on a 52-yard completion from Eli Manning to Plaxico Burress. Three plays later, the Giants took the lead on a 7-yard touchdown pass to Brandon Jacobs. The Patriots responded with a pair of 14-yard completions to Randy Moss and Wes Welker; Welker's catch, his 102nd of the season, set a Patriots franchise record. The Patriots then converted a fourth down, and on their next fourth down, Stephen Gostkowski made a 37-yard field goal. The Patriots would regain the ball at midfield following a Giants three-and-out, and completions to Donté Stallworth and Welker put the Patriots in the Giants' red zone, where they would end the quarter.

=== Second quarter ===
On the first play of the second quarter, Brady completed a 4-yard touchdown pass to Moss, giving the Patriots a 10–7 lead. The play broke one record and tied two others: the Patriots' 560th point of the season surpassed the 1998 Minnesota Vikings's record of 556 points; the touchdown pass was Brady's 49th, tying Peyton Manning's 2004 record; and Moss recorded his 22nd touchdown catch of the season, tying Jerry Rice's 1987 record.

As a result of a 15-yard penalty for unsportsmanlike conduct after the touchdown (Moss was flagged for dancing with Ben Watson in the endzone), the Patriots kicked off from the 15-yard line. Giants wide receiver Domenik Hixon received it from the Giants' 26-yard line and proceeded to run for a 74-yard touchdown return, retaking the lead for the Giants. Starting from their own 33-yard line, the Patriots moved into Giants territory on a 13-yard Maroney rush and 8-yard Faulk reception. Brady's 8 passing yards on the play gave him 4,557 for the season, breaking Drew Bledsoe's 1994 franchise record of 4,555 yards. After the drive stalled, Gostkowski recorded his second field goal for the game, reducing the Giants' lead to 14–13. Following a Giants punt, the Patriots mounted a drive that resulted in Gostkowski's third field goal of the night, from 37 yards, after a 3rd down end zone pass to Moss ricocheted off of linebacker Gerris Wilkinson's helmet. With 1:54 remaining the half and the Giants trailing 16–14, Manning completed five of his first seven passes to move from the Giants' 15-yard line to the Patriots' 3-yard line. On second down with 18 seconds remaining, Manning threw his second touchdown pass of the game, this time to Boss, to take a 21–16 lead at the half.

=== Third quarter ===
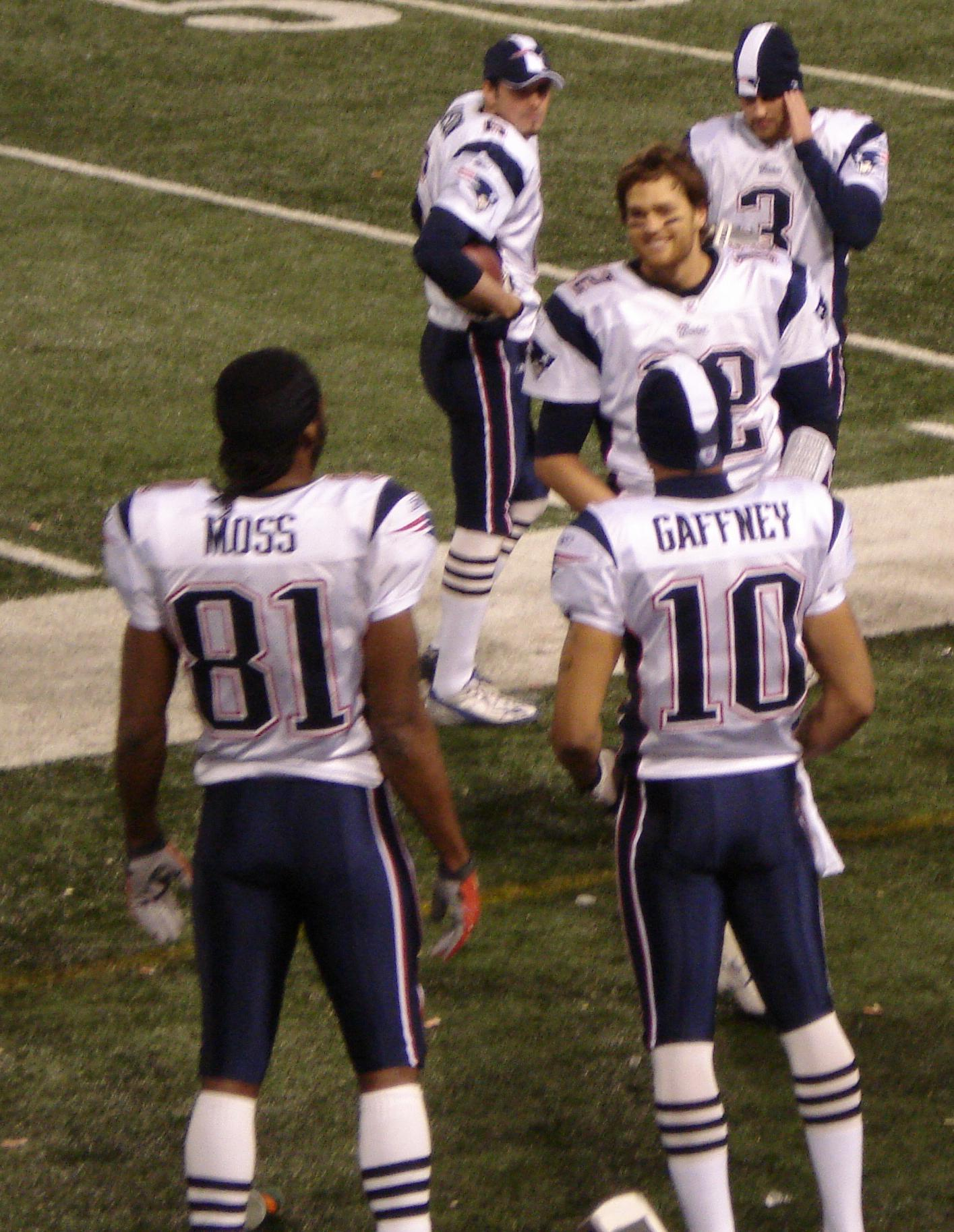
Tom Brady on the sideline with teammates Randy Moss and Jabar Gaffney, after throwing for his record-breaking 50th passing touchdown of the season. Behind him are Patriots punter Chris Hanson (left) and kicker Stephen Gostkowski.

After the Patriots began the second half with a three-and-out, the Giants increased their lead to 12 points on a 19-yard touchdown catch by Burress from Manning. Facing their largest deficit of the season, the Patriots drove to the Giants' 16-yard line with several Brady completions. A pass interference call against the Giants’ Wilkinson gave the Patriots the ball at the Giants' 1-yard line. Brady's end zone pass to linebacker Mike Vrabel was no good, and an illegal formation penalty moved the Patriots back 5 yards. Laurence Maroney then scored on a 6-yard touchdown run to cut the Giants' lead to 28–23. The next three consecutive drives to end the third quarter and begin the fourth resulted in punts.

=== Fourth quarter ===
The Patriots gained possession of the ball with less than 12 minutes remaining in the game. On the second play of the drive, Brady attempted a deep pass to Moss, which was underthrown and dropped. On the next play, Brady attempted another deep pass to Moss, who caught this one for 65 yards, setting two more NFL records: Moss set the record for most touchdown receptions in a season (23) and Brady set one for touchdown passes (50). The touchdown, Brady's last of the game, also brought Brady's touchdown-to-interception margin to +42; Peyton Manning held the previous record, +39 during the 2004–05 season. Additionally, this gave Brady a 6.25:1 touchdown-to-interception ratio on the year, a new single season NFL record (Brady himself would shatter this record again three seasons later). The Patriots converted the subsequent two-point attempt, their only two-point attempt of the season, on a Maroney rush to take a 31–28 lead with 11:15 remaining. On the Giants' ensuing drive, Hobbs intercepted a Manning pass intended for Burress at the Patriots' 48-yard line. After driving to the red zone, a 5-yard catch by Moss marked his 1,493rd reception yard for the season, breaking Stanley Morgan's 1986 franchise record of 1,491 yards. On the subsequent play, Maroney scored his second touchdown of the game on a 5-yard run; Gostkowski converted his last PAT of the season to give the Patriots a 38–28 lead. Gostkowski finished the season a perfect 74-for-74 on PATs, eclipsing St. Louis Rams kicker Jeff Wilkins' 1999 record of 64-for-64.

With 4:36 left in the game, the Giants drove the ball to the Patriots' 4-yard line, and two plays later, Manning completed a 3-yard touchdown pass to Burress, Manning's fourth for the game. But when the Giants tried an onside kick, Vrabel recovered the ball, and Brady knelt thrice to end the game with a final score of 38–35 and seal the Patriots' undefeated regular season.

== Starting lineups ==
New England	Position	Position	New York Giants
OFFENSE
Jabar Gaffney	WR		Plaxico Burress
Matt Light	LT		David Diehl
Logan Mankins	LG		Rich Seubert
Dan Koppen	C		Shaun O'Hara
Russ Hochstein	RG		Chris Snee
Ryan O'Callaghan	RT		Kareem McKenzie
Benjamin Watson	TE		Kevin Boss
Randy Moss	WR		Amani Toomer
Tom Brady	QB		Eli Manning
Laurence Maroney	RB		Brandon Jacobs
Wesley Britt	TE	FB	Madison Hedgecock
DEFENSE
Ty Warren	LE		Michael Strahan
Vince Wilfork	NT	LDT	Barry Cofield
Richard Seymour	RE	RDT	Fred Robbins
Mike Vrabel	LOLB	RE	Osi Umenyiora
Junior Seau	ILB	LOLB	Reggie Torbor
Tedy Bruschi	ILB	MLB	Antonio Pierce
Adalius Thomas	ROLB		Kawika Mitchell
Asante Samuel	LCB		Aaron Ross
Ellis Hobbs	RCB		Sam Madison
Rodney Harrison	SS		James Butler
James Sanders	FS		Gibril Wilson

== Officials ==
- Referee: Mike Carey (#94)
- Umpire: Dan Ferrell (#64)
- Head linesman: Kent Payne (#79)
- Line judge: Mark Perlman (#9)
- Field judge: Buddy Horton (#82)
- Side judge: Tom Fincken (#47)
- Back judge: Bill Schmitz (#122)

== Aftermath ==
With the win, the Patriots' joined the 1972 Miami Dolphins (14–0), 1942 Chicago Bears (11–0), and 1934 Chicago Bears (13–0) as the fourth team to record an undefeated and untied regular season. Their 16 wins also set a record for most regular season wins in a single season. The victory was the Patriots’ 19th consecutive regular season victory, breaking their own record set during the 2003 and 2004 seasons. The Patriots finished the season with a +315 point differential, breaking the 1942 Bears' record of +292, making 37–17 the average score of a Patriots game during the regular season.

The game did not have an impact on the playoff seeding for either team. The Patriots already clinched the AFC's top seed, while the Giants were locked into the 5-seed, as they had already clinched the best record among NFC teams who did not win their division, but could not catch the division-leading Dallas Cowboys.

In the playoffs, the Patriots defeated the Jacksonville Jaguars in the Divisional Round, 31–20, and the San Diego Chargers in the AFC Championship Game, 21–12. This moved the Patriots to 18–0 and one win away from a perfect season. The Giants defeated the Tampa Bay Buccaneers in the Wild Card Round, 24–14, the Cowboys in the Divisional Round, 21–17, and the Green Bay Packers in the NFC Championship Game, 23–20 in overtime, setting up a Super Bowl rematch.

The Giants won Super Bowl XLII, 17–14, denying the Patriots their perfect season and leaving the 1972 Dolphins as the only team to play an undefeated regular season and postseason. In the 16-game era from 1978-2020, the 2007 Patriots were the only team to post a 16–0 regular season record. As of 2025, no team has posted a 17-0 regular season record.

The next season, the Patriots won their first two games, extending their record regular season winning streak to 21 games. They lost to the Miami Dolphins in Week 3, ending the streak. This record winning streak would be later broken by the Indianapolis Colts, who won 23 straight regular season games from 2008–2009.

Four years later, the Giants and Patriots met in Super Bowl XLVI. The Giants would win this Super Bowl as well, by a score of 21–17.

Despite the controversy surrounding the broadcast of this game, the NFL kept the Thursday Night Football exclusively on the NFL Network through 2013. The package was then split between the NFL Network and CBS beginning from 2014 to 2015 and between the NFL Network, CBS, and NBC from 2016 to 2017. Fox purchased the rights to broadcast most TNF games from 2018 to 2022. In order to satisfy its cable carriage agreements, the NFL Network retains seven exclusive regular season broadcasts per year. These include TNF games in Weeks 2 and 3, games played in London with a 9:30 am ET start, and late-season Saturday games.

The game's impact was summarized by Scott Graham on NFL Films' subsequent hour-long replay of the contest ("Perfect Ending", an episode of NFL Films Game Of The Week): "Never had a meaningless game carried more meaning."

== See also ==
- Giants–Patriots rivalry
