= 2007 New York Giants season =

83rd season in franchise history; third Super Bowl win

- Owner: John Mara; Steve Tisch
- General manager: Jerry Reese
- Head coach: Tom Coughlin
- Offensive coordinator: Kevin Gilbride
- Defensive coordinator: Steve Spagnuolo
- Home stadium: Giants Stadium

Results
- Record: 10–6
- Division place: 2nd NFC East
- Playoffs: Won Wild Card Playoffs (at Buccaneers) 24–14; Won Divisional Playoffs (at Cowboys) 21–17; Won NFC Championship (at Packers) 23–20 (OT); Won Super Bowl XLII (vs. Patriots) 17–14
- Pro Bowlers: DE Osi Umenyiora

Uniform
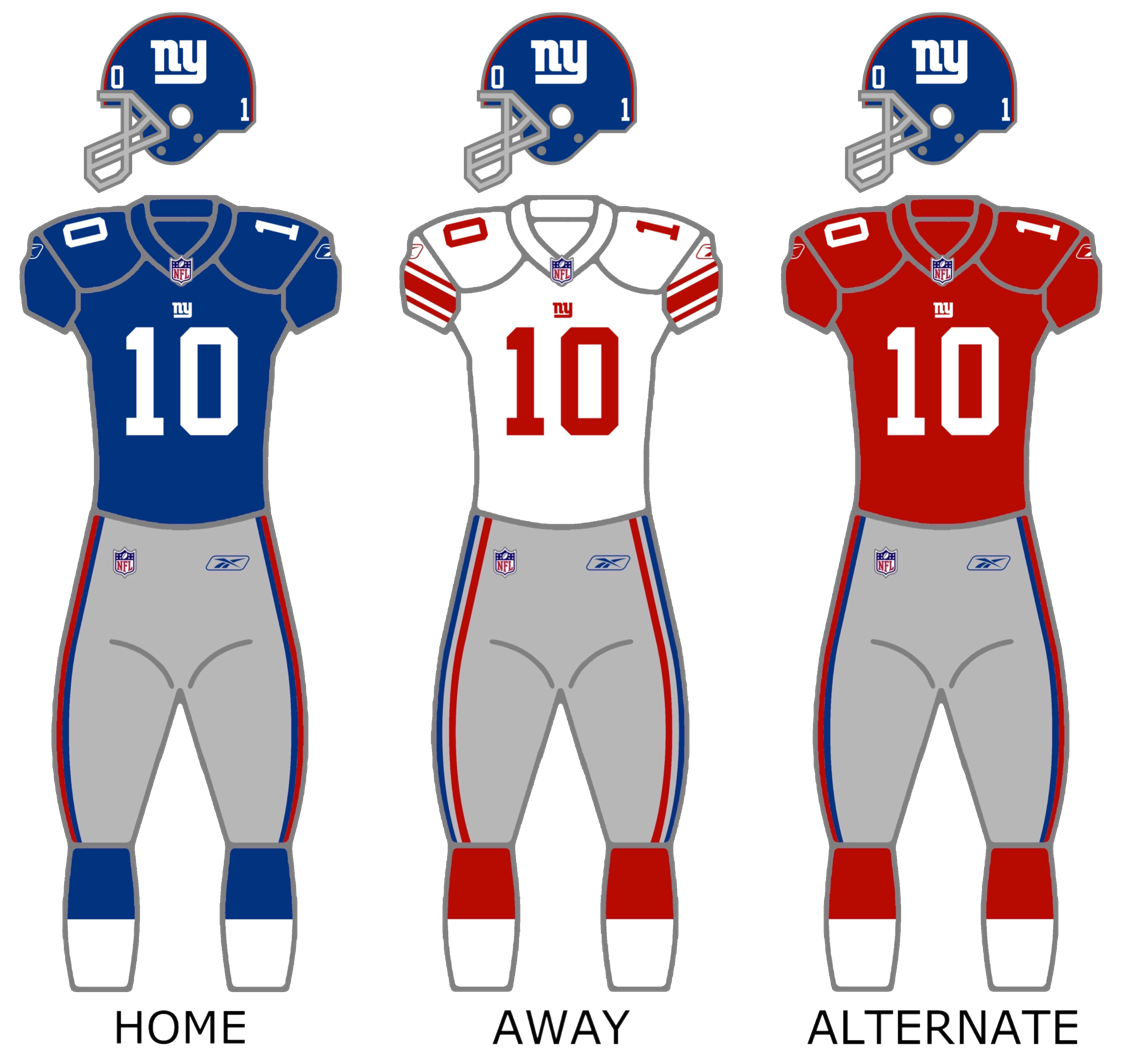

The 2007 season was the New York Giants' 83rd in the National Football League (NFL), their 32nd playing their home games at Giants Stadium in East Rutherford, New Jersey, and their fourth under head coach Tom Coughlin.

The Giants finished the regular season 10–6 and in second place in the NFC East, improving upon their 8–8 record in 2006 in which they finished third in their division. They qualified for the playoffs as a wild-card team as the #5 seed, and beat the #4 seed Tampa Bay Buccaneers 24–14. Next, they defeated the top-seeded Dallas Cowboys 21–17 and the #2 seed Green Bay Packers 23–20 (both of whom they had lost to in their first two games of the season by ten points or more) to become the National Football Conference (NFC) representative in Super Bowl XLII. There, they defeated the heavily favored and previously undefeated 18–0 New England Patriots 17–14 and spoiled their perfect season, aided by the famous Manning to Tyree Helmet Catch.

The 2007 New York Giants became the 9th wild card team in NFL history to reach the Super Bowl and the 5th wild card team to win the Super Bowl, and the very first NFC wild card to accomplish the feat. They were the third team in history to win three road playoff games en route to a Super Bowl and set a league record for most consecutive road wins in a single season (11), though the Super Bowl is played on a neutral field rather than an opponent's stadium. It was the 7th league championship season for the New York Giants and their first since they won Super Bowl XXV in 1990. This season would also mark the end of defensive end Michael Strahan's NFL career as he retired following the Giants' Super Bowl victory.

This was the first season since 1997 that Tiki Barber was not on the opening-day roster.

2007 marked the third consecutive season that the Giants made the playoffs, which was only the second time that had happened since the AFL–NFL merger in 1970. Tom Coughlin joined Bill Parcells, Steve Owen, and Allie Sherman as the only head coaches in the history of the team to lead the Giants to the postseason three consecutive years.

The Giants season is widely regarded as one of the greatest cinderella stories in professional sports history, as not only did they beat one of the greatest teams of all time in the undefeated Patriots, they did so as a wild-card team that had to win three playoff games on the road to get to Super Bowl XLII, which gave them the nickname of "The Road Warriors", and after looking very mediocre at times during the regular season. In fact, based on regular-season performance, the 2007 New York Giants were the worst team to ever reach a Super Bowl, a curiosity later surpassed when the 2011 New York Giants won Super Bowl XLVI to become the first team with a negative point differential to win a Super Bowl. NFL Films named the 2007 Giants as the 53rd greatest team of all time in their countdown of the top 100 teams in football history.

== Offseason ==
=== Expectations ===
After their poor finish to the 2006 season, where the Giants lost 7 of their last 9 games after a 6–2 start (albeit achieving a playoff berth in the last week of the season), expectations for the Giants were generally low. Many pundits began to consider Eli Manning as a potential draft bust, especially when considering fellow 2004 draft pick Ben Roethlisberger's Super Bowl run in 2005 and Philip Rivers leading his team, the Chargers, to a 14–2 regular season in 2006; making matters worse, older brother Peyton Manning, who Eli was often compared unfavorably to, had led the Colts to the Super Bowl victory that same year and won the MVP of the game. At the same time, head coach Tom Coughlin came under intense criticism due to his fiery coaching style and strict team rules, and many (including fans) believed that he deserved to be fired after the team's collapse in the second half of the season. In particular, they noted the team's lack of discipline and unity down the stretch and considered these actions a reflection of Coughlin's coaching. Finally Tiki Barber, the Giants's all-time leading rusher and the catalyst for much of their success the previous two seasons, retired at just 31 years of age to enter a broadcasting career.

The Giants decided to give Tom Coughlin one more chance heading into the 2007 season, giving him a one-year contract extension. This essentially indicated that he needed to get the Giants into the postseason in order to receive a long-term contract extension. After his family demonstrated concern over his on-field persona and his apparent anger towards his players, Coughlin decided to undergo a personality change heading into the season. While his strict team rules (most notoriously, his five-minute early rule for a team meeting) remained in place, he became less angry and more encouraging towards his players, and the players took note of his change. Coughlin also set up a leadership committee with Eli Manning and other team captains in order to relate to his players better.

The Giants also entered the season with two new coordinators. Coughlin promoted quarterbacks coach Kevin Gilbride to offensive coordinator, a position he would hold until his retirement after the 2013 season. He also fired defensive coordinator Tim Lewis and replaced him with Steve Spagnuolo, who would have a crucial impact on the Giants's 4-3 defense.

Defensive end Michael Strahan held out for the entirety of training camp. Having previously been disillusioned with Tom Coughlin's coaching methods, he spent the offseason debating whether or not he would come back for the season, and decided that since he had already played for 14 seasons, he wouldn't have needed the training camp anyway. He eventually returned to the team mere weeks before the season started. Despite his training camp holdout and a hefty fine for not attending the camp, he was still elected as a team captain.

Expectations, however, were still low as few predicted that the Giants would make the playoffs. Perception grew worse as Tiki Barber, now an analyst for NBC, began attacking his former team, particularly Tom Coughlin and especially Eli Manning. Barber attacked Manning not only as a non-productive quarterback, but declared that his leadership skills were "almost comical." When asked about Barber's comments, Manning noted that he didn't have to take the comments seriously, considering that Barber announced his intentions to leave the team in the middle of the previous season.

=== Giants free agents heading into the 2007 season ===
Players whose contracts expire become free agents, and are classified (or "tagged") according to the players' collective bargaining agreement as restricted free agents (RFA), unrestricted free agents (UFA), or exclusive-rights free agents (ERFA). Players listed in green were retained by the team, while those in red were signed by another franchise. Restricted free agents are indicated by the round in which the player was originally drafted, as this determines qualifying offers and compensation.

Position	Player	Free agency tag	Date signed	2007 team
Offensive guard	Lewis Kelly	UFA	—	(none)
Center	Ryan Kuehl	UFA	February 27	New York Giants
Center	Shaun O'Hara	UFA	March 1	New York Giants
Center	Grey Ruegamer	UFA		New York Giants
Tight end	Visanthe Shiancoe	UFA	March 4	Minnesota Vikings
Outside linebacker	Brandon Short	UFA	—	(none)
Outside linebacker	Reggie Torbor	RFA (4)	May 3	New York Giants
Cornerback	Frank Walker	UFA	March 13	Green Bay Packers
Running back	Derrick Ward	RFA (7)	March 1	New York Giants
Safety	Gibril Wilson	RFA (2)	May 3	New York Giants

=== Draft class ===
2007 New York Giants draft
Round	Pick	Player	Position	College	Notes
1	20	Aaron Ross	Cornerback	Texas	
2	51	Steve Smith *	Wide receiver	USC	
3	81	Jay Alford	Defensive tackle	Penn State	
4	116	Zak DeOssie *	Outside linebacker	Brown	
5	153	Kevin Boss	Tight end	Western Oregon	
6	189	Adam Koets	Offensive tackle	Oregon State	
7	224	Michael Johnson	Safety	Arizona	
7	250	Ahmad Bradshaw	Running back	Marshall	
Made roster † Pro Football Hall of Fame * Made at least one Pro Bowl during career

NOTES:

The Giants were awarded an additional seventh-round pick (#250 overall) as a compensatory selection.

=== Training camp photos ===
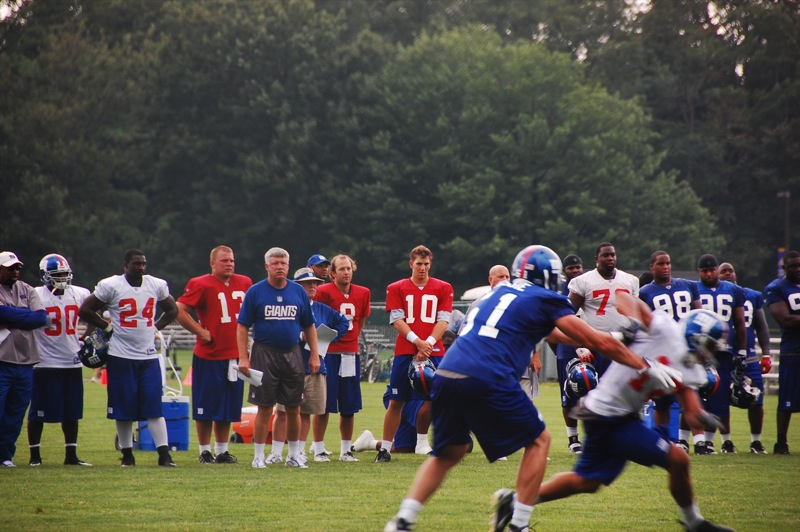
Eli Manning and quarterbacks in training

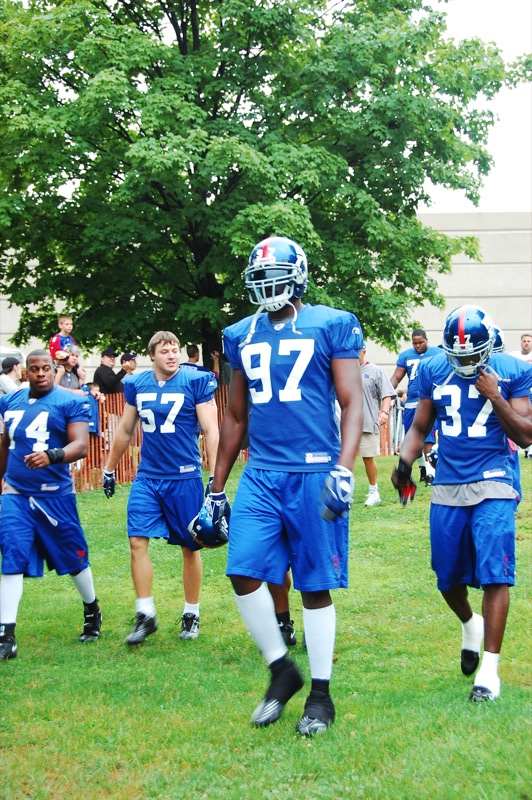
Defensive players at 2007 camp, Albany

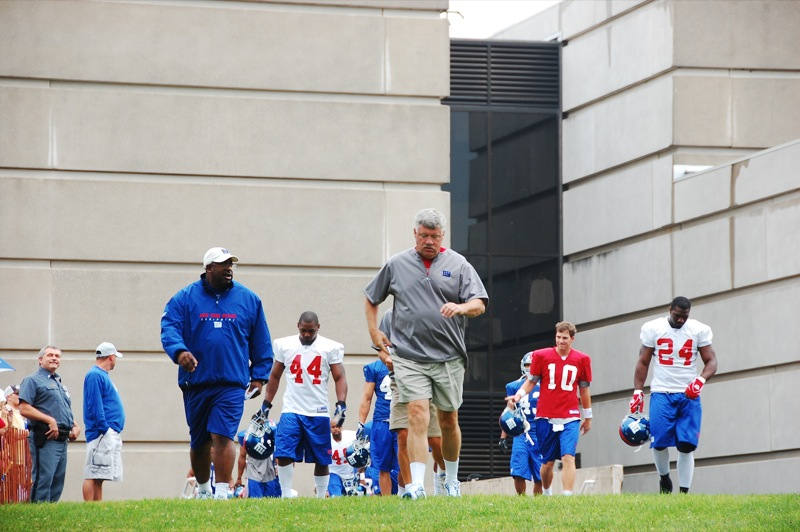
Kevin Gilbride, Giants offense

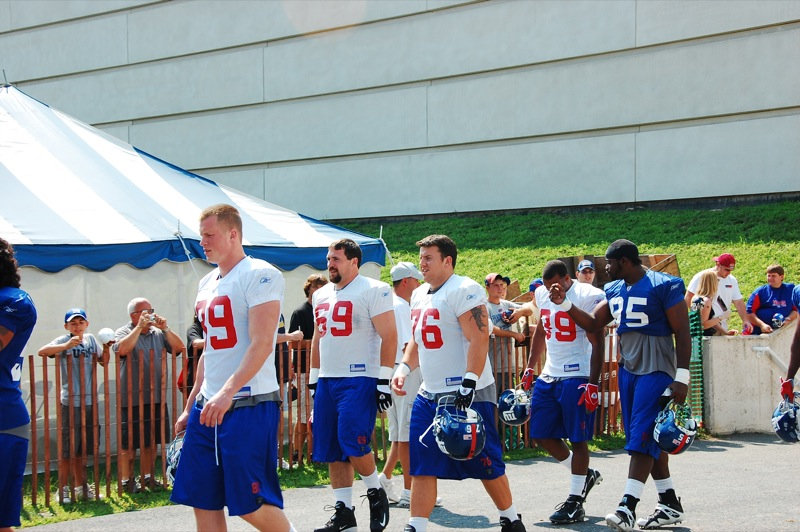
#89 Kevin Boss, #69 Rich Seubert, #76 Chris Snee, #95 Adrian Awasom

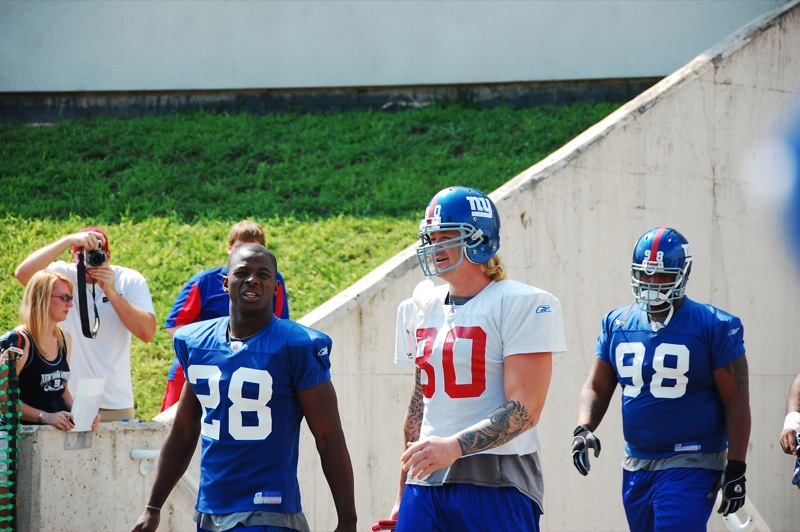
Gibril Wilson, Jeremy Shockey and Fred Robbins

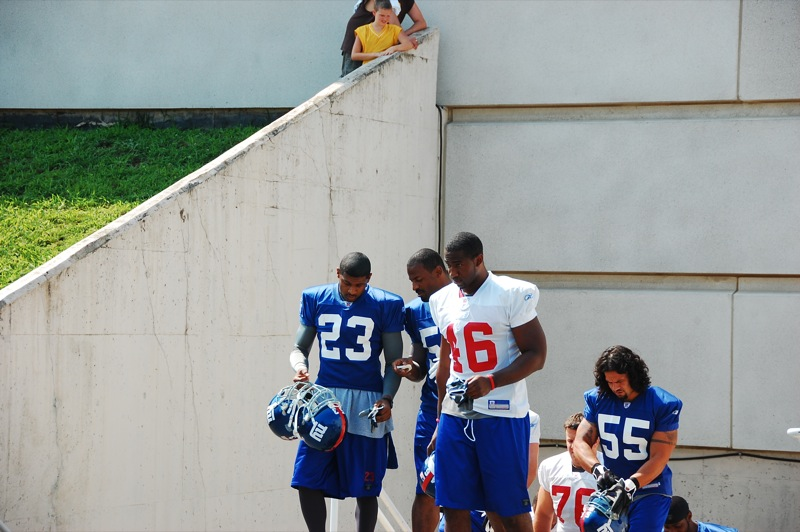
Corey Webster, Barry Robertson, Burgess and Mitchell

== Preseason ==
Week	Date	Opponent	Result	Record	Venue	Recap
1	August 11	Carolina Panthers	L 21–24	0–1	Giants Stadium	Recap
2	August 19	at Baltimore Ravens	W 13–12	1–1	M&T Bank Stadium	Recap
3	August 25	New York Jets	L 12–20	1–2	Giants Stadium	Recap
4	August 30	at New England Patriots	L 20–27	1–3	Gillette Stadium	Recap

== Regular season ==
Week	Date	Opponent	Result	Record	Venue	Recap
1	September 9	at Dallas Cowboys	L 35–45	0–1	Texas Stadium	Recap
2	September 16	Green Bay Packers	L 13–35	0–2	Giants Stadium	Recap
3	September 23	at Washington Redskins	W 24–17	1–2	FedExField	Recap
4	September 30	Philadelphia Eagles	W 16–3	2–2	Giants Stadium	Recap
5	October 7	New York Jets	W 35–24	3–2	Giants Stadium	Recap
6	October 15	at Atlanta Falcons	W 31–10	4–2	Georgia Dome	Recap
7	October 21	San Francisco 49ers	W 33–15	5–2	Giants Stadium	Recap
8	October 28	at Miami Dolphins	W 13–10	6–2	(United Kingdom) Wembley Stadium (London)	Recap
9	Bye					
10	November 11	Dallas Cowboys	L 20–31	6–3	Giants Stadium	Recap
11	November 18	at Detroit Lions	W 16–10	7–3	Ford Field	Recap
12	November 25	Minnesota Vikings	L 17–41	7–4	Giants Stadium	Recap
13	December 2	at Chicago Bears	W 21–16	8–4	Soldier Field	Recap
14	December 9	at Philadelphia Eagles	W 16–13	9–4	Lincoln Financial Field	Recap
15	December 16	Washington Redskins	L 10–22	9–5	Giants Stadium	Recap
16	December 23	at Buffalo Bills	W 38–21	10–5	Ralph Wilson Stadium	Recap
17	December 29	New England Patriots	L 35–38	10–6	Giants Stadium	Recap

== Standings ==
NFC East
	W	L	T	PCT	DIV	CONF	PF	PA	STK
^{(1)} Dallas Cowboys	13	3	0	.813	4–2	10–2	455	325	L1
^{(5)} New York Giants	10	6	0	.625	3–3	7–5	373	351	L1
^{(6)} Washington Redskins	9	7	0	.563	3–3	7–5	334	310	W4
Philadelphia Eagles	8	8	0	.500	2–4	5–7	336	300	W3

== Staff ==
2007 New York Giants staff
Front office: President/CEO – John Mara; Chairman/executive vice president – Steve Tisch; Senior vice president/general manager – Jerry Reese; Vice president of player evaluation – Chris Mara; Assistant general manager – Kevin Abrams; Director of pro personnel – David Gettleman; Assistant director of pro personnel – Ken Sternfeld; Director of college scouting – Marc Ross; Head coaches: Head coach – Tom Coughlin; Offensive coaches: Offensive coordinator – Kevin Gilbride; Quarterbacks – Chris Palmer; Running backs – Jerald Ingram; Wide receivers – Mike Sullivan; Tight ends – Mike Pope; Offensive line – Pat Flaherty; Assistant offensive line – Dave DeGuglielmo; Offensive quality control – Sean Ryan	Defensive coaches: Defensive coordinator – Steve Spagnuolo; Linebackers- Bill Sheridan; Defensive line – Mike Waufle; Defensive backs – Peter Giunta; Secondary/safeties – David Merritt; Defensive quality control – Andre Curtis; Special team coaches: Special teams coordinator – Tom Quinn; Assistant special teams – Thomas McGaughey; Strength and conditioning: Strength and conditioning – Jerry Palmieri; Assistant strength and conditioning – Markus Paul

== Roster ==
2007 New York Giants roster
Quarterbacks (QB): 13 Jared Lorenzen; 10 Eli Manning; 2 Anthony Wright; Running backs (RB): 44 Ahmad Bradshaw KR; 22 Reuben Droughns KR; 39 Madison Hedgecock; 27 Brandon Jacobs; 26 DJ Ware; 27 Derrick Ward; Wide receivers (WR): 17 Plaxico Burress; 87 Domenik Hixon KR; 83 Sinorice Moss; 12 Steve Smith; 81 Amani Toomer; 85 David Tyree; Tight ends (TE): 89 Kevin Boss; 86 Jerome Collins; 88 Michael Matthews	Offensive linemen (OL): 77 Kevin Boothe G; 66 David Diehl T; 61 Adam Koets T; 67 Kareem McKenzie T; 60 Shaun O'Hara C; 65 Grey Ruegamer C/G; 69 Rich Seubert G; 76 Chris Snee G; 79 Guy Whimper T; Defensive linemen (DL): 93 Jay Alford DT; 96 Barry Cofield DT; 99 Russell Davis DT; 98 Fred Robbins DT; 92 Michael Strahan DE; 71 Dave Tollefson DE; 91 Justin Tuck DE/DT; 72 Osi Umenyiora DE; 75 Manuel Wright DT	Linebackers (LB): 57 Chase Blackburn MLB; 52 Tank Daniels OLB; 55 Kawika Mitchell OLB; 58 Antonio Pierce MLB; 53 Reggie Torbor OLB; 59 Gerris Wilkinson OLB; Defensive backs (DB): 37 James Butler SS; 30 Craig Dahl SS; 35 Kevin Dockery CB; 43 Michael Johnson FS/SS; 29 Sam Madison CB; 25 R. W. McQuarters CB; 31 Aaron Ross CB; 23 Corey Webster CB; 28 Gibril Wilson FS; Special teams (ST): 51 Zak DeOssie LS; 18 Jeff Feagles P; 9 Lawrence Tynes K	Practice squad: 41 Darren Barnett CB; 70 Na'Shan Goddard T; 45 Jonny Harline TE; 36 Kay-Jay Harris RB; 19 Brandon London WR; 3 Todd Lowber WR; 33 Geoffrey Pope CB; 47 Andrew Shanle S; -- Brandon Torrey OL; Reserve: 95 Adrian Awasom DE; -- Dek Bake DT; 24 Robert Douglas RB; 20 Jim Finn FB; 15 Michael Jennings WR; 48 Darcy Johnson TE; 94 William Joseph DT; 97 Mathias Kiwanuka LB; 90 Ryan Kuehl LS; -- Todd Londot C; 80 Jeremy Shockey TE; 34 Derrick Ward RB; Rookies in italics 53 active, 12 reserve, 8 practice squad

== Regular season ==
=== Week 1: at Dallas Cowboys ===
Quarter	1	2	3	4	Total
Giants	6	10	3	16	35
Cowboys	3	14	14	14	45

at Texas Stadium, Irving, Texas

- Date: September 9
- Game time: 8:15 PM EDT
- Game weather: 78 °F (26 °C), Cloudy Skies
- Game attendance: 63,031
- Referee: Ed Hochuli
- TV announcers (NBC): Al Michaels (play-by-play), John Madden (color commentator), & Andrea Kremer (sideline reporter)
- Game Book

The Giants opened up their 2007 campaign with a 45–35 loss to the Dallas Cowboys at Texas Stadium. For the second straight year, the Giants left Dallas with injuries to key starters including defensive end Osi Umenyiora, running back Brandon Jacobs, and quarterback Eli Manning. Before suffering a separated shoulder in the fourth quarter, Manning put on a stellar performance, completing 28 of 41 passes, for 312 yards, 4 touchdowns and just 1 interception. However, a horrid defensive performance overshadowed his play.

The Giants got off to a fast start as Manning hit Plaxico Burress on a 60-yard touchdown pass off play action to open up the scoring. Burress and Manning would connect for 3 touchdowns on the night. After a Dallas took a 17–6 lead late in the half, Manning led the Giants on another drive, capped off to his second strike to Burress. Burress on the night caught 9 passes for 144 receiving yards. The Giants closed to within one at half's end following a Lawrence Tynes field goal after a Dallas fumble.

Romo hit Terrell Owens on a 22-yard pass to give Dallas an 8-point lead. After the Giants cut the lead to five on another Tynes field goal, Dallas increased the margin to 12 as Romo capped off a quick four play drive with a 9-yard rush. The Cowboys appeared to put the game away with yet another Romo touchdown, once again finding Terrell Owens on a wide open catch and run, upping margin to 38–22. Eli and the Giants responded with two straight scoring drives. One finished with a dumpoff touchdown pass from Manning to reserve running back Derrick Ward and the other with Burress' third touchdown, cutting the Dallas lead to three.

On a crucial 3rd and 7 late in the game, Romo hit backup wideout Sam Hurd for a 51-yard touchdown. With Manning injuring his shoulder, backup Jared Lorenzen finished the game for the Giants at quarterback late in the fourth quarter. Amani Toomer in his return from a knee injury, notched 9 catches for 91 yards while Burress gained 144. Justin Tuck and Gibril Wilson recorded the Giants' only sack and interception of the night respectively in the 45–35 loss as the Giants began the season at 0–1.

It would be the only road loss for the Giants in the season.

=== Week 2: vs. Green Bay Packers ===
Quarter	1	2	3	4	Total
Packers	0	7	7	21	35
Giants	0	10	3	0	13

at Giants Stadium, East Rutherford, New Jersey

- Date: September 16
- Game time: 1:00 PM EDT
- Game weather: 64 °F (18 °C), Mostly Cloudy
- Game attendance: 78,701
- Referee: Gene Steratore
- TV announcers (Fox): Joe Buck (play-by-play), Troy Aikman (color commentator), & Pam Oliver (sideline reporter)
- Game Book

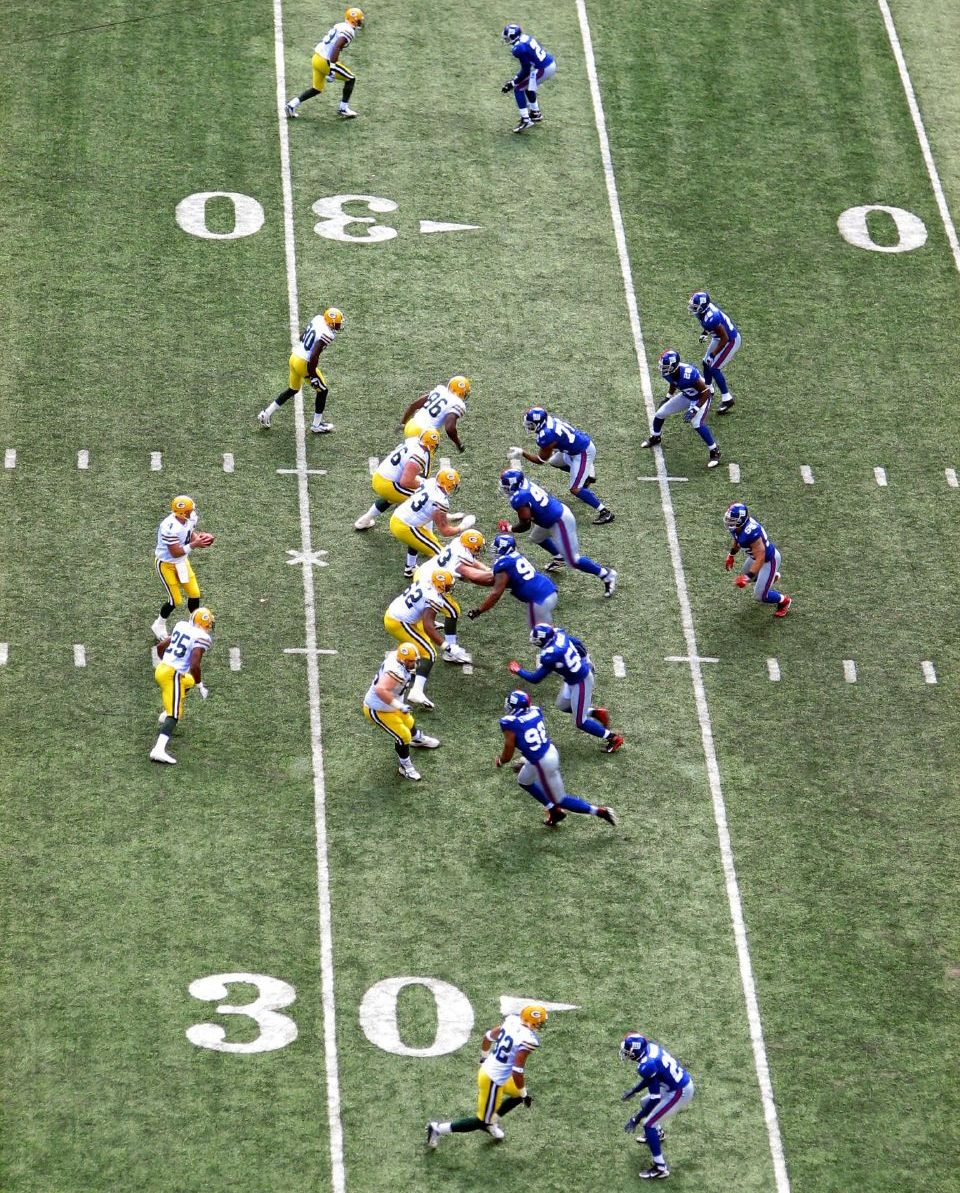
The Giants playing defense against the Packers

The Giants played their Week 2 home opener against the Green Bay Packers. After both teams missed a field goal to open the game, Green Bay got on the board first with a 6-yard run by rookie DeShawn Wynn. The Giants responded with a 26-yard scoring strike by Eli Manning to Plaxico Burress. The Giants got a Lawrence Tynes field goal and a 10–7 half time lead.

In the second half, the Packers drove 51 yards to start the second half. Favre capped off the scoring drive with a 2-yard pass to Bubba Franks for a 14–10 lead the Packers would not relinquish. The Giants responded with another drive but once again, an unsportsmanlike conduct penalty, this one on Amani Toomer, hurt the Giants. Tynes kicked a second field goal, pulling the Giants to within one.

The Packers went on to score 21 unanswered points.

With the loss, the Giants would fall to 0–2 for the first time since 1996. Also, within the two games they played, the Giants gave up a total of 80 points.

=== Week 3: at Washington Redskins ===
Quarter	1	2	3	4	Total
Giants	3	0	7	14	24
Redskins	7	10	0	0	17

at FedExField, Landover, Maryland

- Date: September 23
- Game time: 4:15 PM EDT
- Game weather: 82 °F (28 °C), Sunny
- Game attendance: 90,803
- Referee: Walt Coleman
- TV announcers (Fox): Joe Buck (play-by-play), Troy Aikman (color commentator), & Pam Oliver (sideline reporter)
- Game Book

In the first quarter, New York got the first score as kicker Lawrence Tynes hit a 34-yard field goal. The Redskins took the lead with running back Clinton Portis getting a 1-yard TD run. In the second quarter, Redskins quarterback Jason Campbell threw an 8-yard touchdown pass to tight end Chris Cooley, while kicker Shaun Suisham ended the half with a 47-yard field goal that gave Washington a 17–3 lead.

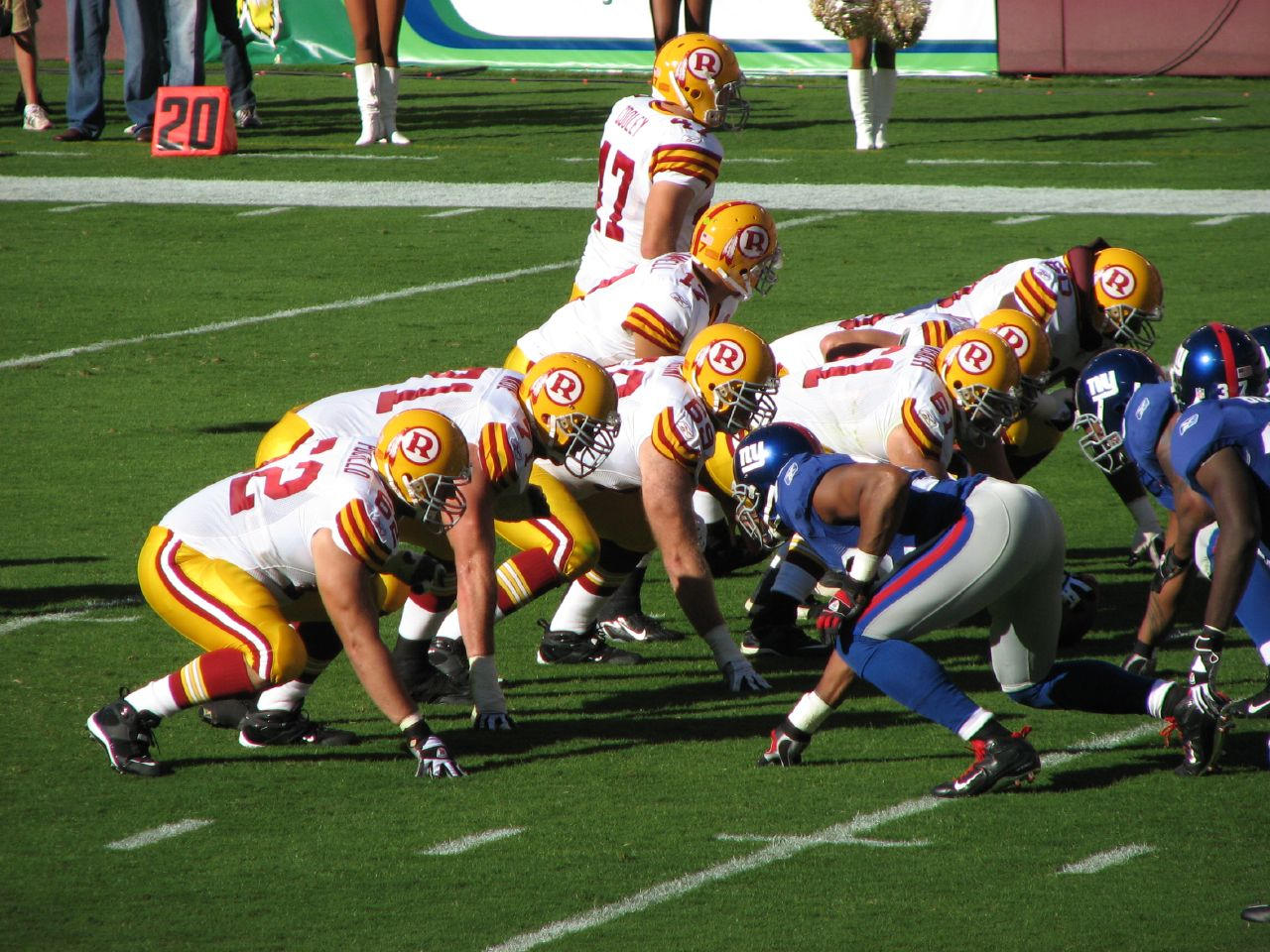
The Giants on defense against the Redskins

With the Giants staring at a 14-point deficit, and an 0–2 start to their season, the Giants came out strong to start the second half. In the third quarter, quarterback Eli Manning finally got the Giants offense turned around and running back Reuben Droughns would score on a 1-yard touchdown run to cut the lead in half.

In the fourth quarter, Droughns rushed again for a 1-yard touchdown, while Manning completed a 33-yard touchdown pass to wide receiver Plaxico Burress, giving the Giants a startling 24–17 lead against the home team.

In the game's final moments, Washington found first and goal at the Giants 1-yard line. New York's defense then proceeded to make a goal-line stand as they stopped running back Ladell Betts from getting into the end zone on 4th down during the final seconds of the game. This goal line stand was known as the initial catalyst of the Giants' Super Bowl season.

With the win, the Giants improved to 1–2.

=== Week 4: vs. Philadelphia Eagles ===
Quarter	1	2	3	4	Total
Eagles	0	0	0	3	3
Giants	0	7	9	0	16

at Giants Stadium, East Rutherford, New Jersey

- Date: September 30
- Game time: 8:15 PM EDT
- Game weather: 67 °F (19 °C), Mostly Clear
- Game attendance: 78,862
- Referee: Terry McAulay
- TV announcers (NBC): Al Michaels (play-by-play), John Madden (color commentator), & Andrea Kremer (sideline reporter)
- Game Book

Coming off their divisional road win over the Redskins, the Giants went home for a Sunday night divisional duel with the Philadelphia Eagles. New York's defense held the Eagles to no first half points, while in the second quarter, New York got on the board first with quarterback Eli Manning completing a 9-yard touchdown pass to wide receiver Plaxico Burress for the only score of the half. In the third quarter, the Giants increased its lead with kicker Lawrence Tynes getting a 29-yard field goal, along with linebacker Kawika Mitchell recovering a fumble, getting up, and returning the fumble 17-yards for a touchdown. In the fourth quarter, the Eagles would get their only points of the game with kicker David Akers making a 53-yard field goal.

On the night, New York's defense sacked quarterback Donovan McNabb 12 times (tying an NFL record), with half of those sacks coming from defensive end Osi Umenyiora. Also, defensive end Michael Strahan had one sack in the game to surpass Lawrence Taylor as the Giants' all-time sack leader (Taylor was present at the game).

With the victory, New York improved to 2–2.

=== Week 5: vs. New York Jets ===
Quarter	1	2	3	4	Total
Jets	7	10	7	0	24
Giants	0	7	14	14	35

at Giants Stadium, East Rutherford, New Jersey

- Date: October 7
- Game time: 1:00 PM EDT
- Game weather: 81 °F (27 °C), Partly Sunny
- Referee: Bill Carollo
- TV announcers (CBS): Dick Enberg (play-by-play) and Randy Cross (color commentator)
- Game Book

The Giants clinched their third straight victory with a 35–24 triumph over the New York Jets. The Giants scored 28 points in the decisive second half to overcome a 10-point deficit. Rookie cornerback Aaron Ross made his presence felt with a crucial interception off of quarterback Chad Pennington with the Jets driving and up three in the third then sealed the win with an interception return for a touchdown late in the fourth.

The Jets got off to a fast start as returning running back Brandon Jacobs fumbled and the Jets' Kerry Rhodes returned it for a touchdown. The Giants responded with a 9-play, 67-yard drive ending in a touchdown run by Derrick Ward. However, the Giants defense, susceptible to third down conversions the first week of the season struggled again today and allowed the Jets to drive 93 yards late in the half for a 14–7 lead. The Jets were 3 for 3 on third down on the drive including some big catches by Laveranues Coles. Pennington hit Brad Smith for a 16-yard touchdown. After a bad interception from Eli Manning, the Jets added a field goal by Mike Nugent for a 17–7 halftime lead.

The Giants fought back, going back to the ground game to start the second half. Plaxico Burress added a 25-yard completion from Manning and Jacobs pounded it in for a 19-yard touchdown. The Jets responded as Leon Washington ran 98 yards for a touchdown. Big Blue again fought back, driving 68 yards featuring a mix of runs and passes. Jeremy Shockey notched his first touchdown of the season with a 13-yard catch and run bringing the Giants within three after three quarters. The Jets responded with a drive of their own including several third down conversions but rookie Aaron Ross made the first of several big plays including a deep interception. The Giants drove 99 yards, which ended with a spectacular 53-yard touchdown catch and run by Plaxico Burress, who stiff-armed a Jets defender down the sideline.

With the Jets driving for a score, Ross struck again, intercepting Pennington and returned it 43 yards to clinch the win. Brandon Jacobs notched his first ever 100-yard rushing performance, Manning managed 186 yards and 2 touchdowns despite a poor first half, Osi Umenyiora added a sack and Sam Madison added his first interception of the season.

The Giants had now won four straight regular season meetings against the Jets and improved to 3–2 on the season.

=== Week 6: at Atlanta Falcons ===
Quarter	1	2	3	4	Total
Giants	14	7	0	10	31
Falcons	10	0	0	0	10

at Georgia Dome, Atlanta, Georgia

- Date: October 15
- Game time: 8:30 PM EDT
- Game weather: Game Played Indoors (Domed Stadium)
- Referee: Bill Leavy
- TV announcers (ESPN): Mike Tirico (play-by-play), Ron Jaworski and Tony Kornheiser (color commentators)
- Game Book

The Giants cruised to their fourth straight win with an easy 31–10 victory over the Atlanta Falcons on Monday Night Football. After the Falcons moved the ball and scored three points on a 47-yard field goal by Morten Andersen, the Giants took the lead on a five-yard play-action touchdown pass from Eli Manning to Amani Toomer. The Falcons responded as Jerious Norwood ran 67 yards untouched, putting the Falcons on top 10–7. New York responded with a quick six-play, 82-yard drive capped off by a 1-yard touchdown run by Reuben Droughns for a 14–10 lead.

After the defense stopped Atlanta again, the Giants took command as Manning hit Plaxico Burress for his eighth and league-lead-tying touchdown from 42 yards out and a 21–10 lead. The Giants squandered several chances to add on more points as the team struggled moving at the end of the first half and Eli Manning threw a late interception.

In the second half, the defense continued to dominate. Fred Robbins, Antonio Pierce and Justin Tuck notched sacks for Big Blue and rookie Aaron Ross added his third interception in two weeks. The Giants added a Lawrence Tynes field goal from 32 yards out for a 14-point lead, then capped off the win with a nine-yard touchdown run by Derrick Ward. On the night, the Giants rushed for 188 yards, Eli Manning passed for 303 yards along with a pair of touchdowns and interceptions and the defense shut down Atlanta following the slow start.

Burress led the Giants with 97 receiving yards and Amani Toomer became the Giants all-time reception leader, catching 7 passes for 89 yards including his early touchdown. The Giants improved to 4–2 and took a four-game winning streak into the next week's game against the 49ers.

- The Giants and Falcons series has now been won by the road team the last 12 meetings.
- The Giants notched their 600th franchise win.
- The 6.7 Nielsen rating (8.48 million viewers) was the lowest in Monday Night Football history, however it was the highest rated cable program for the week. The decisive Game 4 of the National League Championship Series was played at the same time.

=== Week 7: vs. San Francisco 49ers ===
Quarter	1	2	3	4	Total
49ers	0	7	2	6	15
Giants	6	13	7	7	33

at Giants Stadium, East Rutherford, New Jersey

- Date: October 21
- Game time: 1:00 PM EDT
- Game weather: 69 °F (21 °C), Sunny
- Referee: Ron Winter
- TV announcers (Fox): Matt Vasgersian (play-by-play), Daryl Johnston (color commentator) and Tony Siragusa (sideline reporter)
- Game Book

The Giants recorded their fifth straight victory with a convincing 33–15 win over the San Francisco 49ers at Giants Stadium. Things started off well as the Giants drove right down the field on their opening possession. The balanced, well-executed seven-minute drive was capped off by a 4-yard touchdown pass from Eli Manning to Amani Toomer. The extra point was missed by Lawrence Tynes. On their next possession, the Giants were driving for more, but a tipped ball resulted in an interception inside the red zone. The 49ers responded with a nice drive of their own, aided by a personal foul on linebacker Antonio Pierce and several third down conversions. San Francisco cashed in with a touchdown from Trent Dilfer to Arnaz Battle.

Following a Frank Gore fumble, the Giants took control. The running game, which accounted for 140 total yards helped the Giants move back in front. Brandon Jacobs scored on a five-yard run for a 13–7 lead. After an interception by Sam Madison, the Giants added a 30-yard field goal by Tynes. Tynes made it 19–7 at the half with another field goal, this time from 39 yards, inside the final minute.

The Giants defense dominated in the second half, notching six sacks and four total turnovers. Osi Umenyiora put the game away with a sack, forced fumble, and 75-yard touchdown return up the field for a 26–7 lead. The Niners got two points back on a blocked punt out of the end zone but Antonio Pierce redeemed himself for two earlier personal fouls by intercepting Trent Dilfer and returning the ball inside the 10. After a flag on the 49ers, Manning threw his second touchdown, this time to Jeremy Shockey for a 33–9 lead. The 49ers scored late to provide the final points in the 33–15 win.

On the day, Brandon Jacobs rushed for 107 yards, Manning completed 18 of 31 passes for nearly 150 yards with two touchdowns and an interception, and the defense notched six sacks: 2.5 for Michael Strahan, 1.5 for Justin Tuck, 1 for Aaron Ross and 1 for Umenyiora. Pierce and Madison provided the two Giants interceptions.

For the fourth consecutive year under Tom Coughlin, the Giants were 5–2 after seven games.

=== Week 8: at Miami Dolphins (London) ===
Quarter	1	2	3	4	Total
Giants	3	10	0	0	13
Dolphins	0	0	3	7	10

at Wembley Stadium, London, England

- Date: October 28
- Game time: 1:00 PM EDT
- Game weather: 59 °F (15 °C), Overcast With Light Rain
- Game attendance: 81,176
- Referee: Gerry Austin
- TV announcers (Fox): Thom Brennaman (play-by-play), Daryl Johnston (color commentator), & Tony Siragusa (sideline reporter)
- Game Book

The Giants got their sixth straight win with a rain-soaked 13–10 victory over the winless Miami Dolphins in the first International Series game, held at England's Wembley Stadium. Persistent rain throughout the day had soaked the field and hurt both teams on offense as the field was torn up for most of the afternoon, but the Giants survived to get to 6–2 on the season as they headed for their bye week.

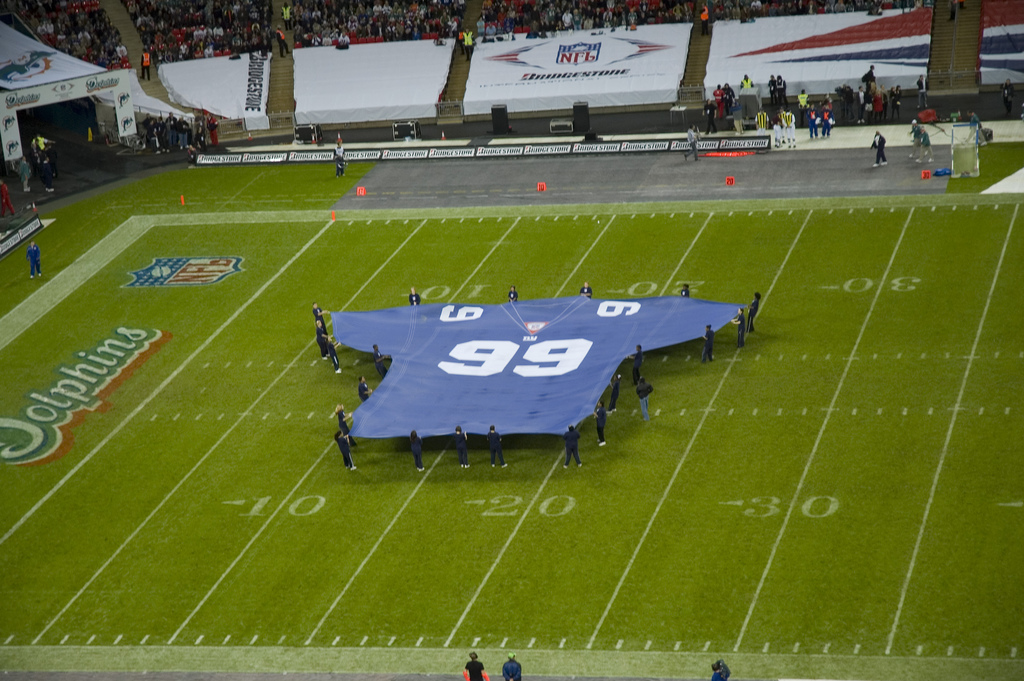
A giant Giants jersey is unfurled on the field at Wembley Stadium

After a missed Miami field goal on the opening drive of the game, the Giants traveled down the field, mixing up a combination of run and pass. Brandon Jacobs had a big day, running in the rain for 131 yards on 23 carries. Eli Manning, who threw for only 59 yards in the game, missed a wide open Amani Toomer in the end zone from inside the five, and the Giants had to settle for a 20-yard field goal from Lawrence Tynes. The Giants extended their lead to 10 with a 14-play, 69-yard drive in the second quarter. Jacobs and Reuben Droughns ran heavily on the drive and Eli Manning evaded the Dolphins defense, scrambling 10 yards for the game's first touchdown. After a Cleo Lemon fumble, which was recovered by Michael Strahan, the Giants stretched the lead to 13 at the half with a 41-yard kick from Tynes.

In the third quarter, after recovering a Manning fumble, the Dolphins drove the ball down inside the Giants 5. However, a Lemon muffed snap forced the Dolphins to kick a field goal. The Giants continued to run well with Jacobs, and had a chance to tack on 3 more points but Tynes missed badly on a 29-yard field goal. In the final two minutes, the Dolphins scored their first touchdown with Ted Ginn Jr.'s first ever NFL touchdown reception. An attempted onside kick from Jay Feely skidded off the wet surface straight out of bounds, enabling the Giants to run out the clock for the win.

For the day, Jacobs ran for his career-high 131 yards, and Fred Robbins and Kawika Mitchell recorded sacks. The Giants have won six in a row for the first time since 1994. Eli Manning scored the NFL's first regular season touchdown outside of North America.

With their sixth-straight win, the Giants entered their bye week at 6–2.

=== Week 10: vs. Dallas Cowboys ===
Quarter	1	2	3	4	Total
Cowboys	7	10	7	7	31
Giants	7	10	0	3	20

at Giants Stadium, East Rutherford, New Jersey

- Date: November 11
- Game time: 4:15 pm EST
- Game weather: 47 °F (8 °C), Clear
- Game attendance: 78,964
- Referee: Jeff Triplette
- TV announcers (Fox): Joe Buck (play-by-play), Troy Aikman (color commentator), & Pam Oliver (sideline reporter)
- Game Book

Coming off their bye week, the Giants went home, donned their alternate red uniforms, and played the Dallas Cowboys. In the first quarter, New York trailed early as Cowboys quarterback Tony Romo completed a 15-yard touchdown pass to tight end Tony Curtis. The Giants responded as quarterback Eli Manning completed an 8-yard touchdown pass to tight end Jeremy Shockey. In the second quarter, Dallas regained the lead as kicker Nick Folk made a 44-yard field goal. The Giants took the lead with running back Reuben Droughns getting a 1-yard touchdown run. Afterwards, the Cowboys retook the lead with Romo completing a 20-yard touchdown pass to wide receiver Patrick Crayton. Originally, the Giants were willing to be down by 3 at halftime. However, because a taunting penalty on Dallas linebacker Kevin Burnett placed them near midfield, New York went for some points. The Giants tied the game with kicker Lawrence Tynes making a 40-yard field goal.

In the third quarter, Romo completed a 25-yard touchdown pass to wide receiver Terrell Owens and the Cowboys regained the lead. In the fourth quarter, the Giants made a 26-yard field goal from Tynes. Afterwards, Dallas' Romo and Owens hooked up with each other again on a 50-yard touchdown pass.

With the loss, New York fell to 6–3, and were swept by the Cowboys for the first time since 2003. They have not worn their red uniforms since.

During the season series against the Cowboys, the Giants pass defense allowed 8 passing touchdowns, despite only allowing 8 passing touchdowns from their previous opponents this year.

=== Week 11: at Detroit Lions ===
Quarter	1	2	3	4	Total
Giants	3	7	3	3	16
Lions	0	0	3	7	10

at Ford Field, Detroit, Michigan

- Date: November 18
- Game time: 1:00 PM EST
- Game weather: Game Played Indoors (Domed Stadium)
- Game attendance: 60,675
- Referee: Tony Corrente
- TV announcers (Fox): Kenny Albert (play-by-play), Daryl Johnston (color commentator), & Tony Siragusa (sideline reporter)
- Game Book

The Giants flew to Ford Field for a Week 11 intraconference duel with the Detroit Lions. In the first quarter, New York took the early lead as kicker Lawrence Tynes made a 28-yard field goal for the only score of the period. In the second quarter, the Giants increased their lead as quarterback Eli Manning completed a 10-yard TD pass to running back Brandon Jacobs for the only score of the period.

In the third quarter, the Lions got on the board as kicker Jason Hanson made a 42-yard field goal. New York would reply with Tynes kicking a 46-yard field goal. In the fourth quarter, the Giants improved their lead as Tynes made a 20-yard field goal. Detroit's quarterback Jon Kitna completed a 35-yard touchdown pass to wide receiver Calvin Johnson.

With the win, the Giants improved to 7–3.

Linebacker Mathias Kiwanuka suffered a broken left fibula, ending his season.

=== Week 12: vs. Minnesota Vikings ===
Quarter	1	2	3	4	Total
Vikings	14	10	3	14	41
Giants	7	0	3	7	17

at Giants Stadium, East Rutherford, New Jersey

- Date: November 25
- Game time: 1:00 PM EST
- Game weather: 46 °F (8 °C), sunny
- Game attendance: 78,591
- Referee: Walt Anderson
- TV announcers (Fox): Kenny Albert (play-by-play), Daryl Johnston (color commentator), and Tony Siragusa (sideline reporter)
- Game Book

Coming off their road win over the Lions, the Giants went home for a Week 12 intraconference duel with the Minnesota Vikings. In the first quarter, New York trailed early as Vikings quarterback Tarvaris Jackson completed a 60-yard touchdown pass to wide receiver Sidney Rice. The Giants responded with running back Reuben Droughns getting a 1-yard touchdown run. Minnesota retook the lead with safety Darren Sharper returning an interception 20 yards for a touchdown. In the second quarter, Vikings' running back Chester Taylor got an 8-yard touchdown run, along with kicker Ryan Longwell making a 46-yard field goal.

In the third quarter, Giants' kicker Lawrence Tynes made a 48-yard field goal, and Minnesota's Longwell made a 26-yard field goal. In the fourth quarter, the Vikings' safety Dwight Smith returned an interception 93 yards for a touchdown, along with linebacker Chad Greenway returning an interception 37 yards for a touchdown. New York's quarterback Eli Manning completed a 6-yard touchdown pass to wide receiver Plaxico Burress to complete the scoring.

With the loss, the Giants fell to 7–4.

Eli Manning was intercepted four times (with three of his interceptions being returned for touchdowns). He became the fourth quarterback in NFL history to have three interceptions get returned for touchdowns. His performance was all the more embarrassing as the Vikings had the league's worst pass defense in 2007 (albeit with the league's strongest run defense), and were playing in this game without starting corner Antoine Winfield.

=== Week 13: at Chicago Bears ===
Quarter	1	2	3	4	Total
Giants	0	7	0	14	21
Bears	7	6	3	0	16

at Soldier Field, Chicago, Illinois

- Date: December 2
- Game time: 4:15 PM EST
- Game weather: 46 °F (8 °C), Chance Of Rain Showers
- Game attendance: 62,244
- Referee: Walt Coleman
- TV announcers (Fox): Joe Buck (play-by-play), Troy Aikman (color commentator), & Pam Oliver (sideline reporter)
- Game Book

Hoping to rebound after a loss to the Vikings, the Giants flew to Soldier Field for a Week 13 intraconference duel with the defending NFC champion Chicago Bears. In the first quarter, New York trailed early as Bears quarterback Rex Grossman completed a 1-yard touchdown pass to tight end Desmond Clark for the only score of the period. In the second quarter, the Giants got on the board as running back Derrick Ward got a 2-yard touchdown run. Chicago responded with kicker Robbie Gould getting a 35-yard and a 46-yard field goal.

In the third quarter, the Bears increased their lead to 16–7 with Gould making a 41-yard field goal for the only score of the period. In the fourth quarter, New York scored touchdowns on their last two drives in the final 7 minutes; Eli Manning completed a 6-yard touchdown pass to wide receiver Amani Toomer (initially ruled an incomplete pass that was challenged and overturned), then running back Reuben Droughns got a 2-yard touchdown run. The Giants held on defensively and improved to 8–4 with the victory.

Derrick Ward (24 carries for 154 yards and 1 touchdown) left the game in the fourth quarter with a fractured fibula, effectively ending his season.

Excluding Super Bowl XLII two months later, Michael Strahan had his final career sack in the second quarter.

=== Week 14: at Philadelphia Eagles ===
Quarter	1	2	3	4	Total
Giants	0	6	10	0	16
Eagles	7	0	3	3	13

at Lincoln Financial Field, Philadelphia, Pennsylvania

- Date: December 9
- Game time: 1:00 PM EST
- Game weather: 36 °F (2 °C), Cloudy
- Game attendance: 68,594
- Referee: Ron Winter
- TV announcers (Fox): Kenny Albert (play-by-play), Daryl Johnston (color commentator), & Tony Siragusa (sideline reporter)
- Game Book

Coming off their road win over the Bears, the Giants flew to Lincoln Financial Field for a Week 14 NFC East rematch with the Philadelphia Eagles. In the first quarter, New York trailed early as Eagles quarterback Donovan McNabb completed an 18-yard touchdown pass to running back Brian Westbrook for the only score of the period. In the second quarter, the Giants started to draw close as kicker Lawrence Tynes managed to get a 19-yard and a 23-yard field goal.

In the third quarter, Philadelphia responded with kicker David Akers getting a 29-yard field goal. Afterwards, New York took the lead with quarterback Eli Manning completing a 20-yard touchdown pass to wide receiver Plaxico Burress, along with Tynes kicking a 23-yard field goal. In the fourth quarter, the Eagles tried to come back as Akers nailed a 39-yard field goal. In the final seconds, Philadelphia had a chance to tie the game and force overtime. Fortunately for the Giants, Akers missed a 57-yard field goal off the right upright with 1 second left to preserve the victory and the season-sweep.

With the win, the Giants improved to 9–4.

This also marked the first time since their Super Bowl XXXV appearance of 2000 that New York had won 6-straight road games. As of 2025, this is the last time the Giants have swept the Eagles.

=== Week 15: vs. Washington Redskins ===
Quarter	1	2	3	4	Total
Redskins	3	13	6	0	22
Giants	0	3	7	0	10

at Giants Stadium, East Rutherford, New Jersey

- Date: December 16
- Game time: 8:15 PM EST
- Game weather: 36 °F (2 °C), Cloudy
- Game attendance: 77,899
- Referee: Peter Morelli
- TV announcers (NBC): Al Michaels (play-by-play), John Madden (color commentator), & Andrea Kremer (sideline reporter)
- Game Book

Coming off their season-sweeping road win over the Eagles, the Giants went home for a Week 15 Sunday night NFC East rematch with the Washington Redskins. In the first quarter, New York trailed early as Redskins kicker Shaun Suisham managed to get a 49-yard field goal for the only score of the period. In the second quarter, the Giants continued to trail as Suisham kicked a 31-yard field goal, along with running back Ladell Betts getting a 14-yard touchdown run. New York would get on the board with kicker Lawrence Tynes getting a 35-yard field goal. Washington would end the half with Suisham nailing a 28-yard field goal.

In the third quarter, the Giants' deficit climbed as Redskins running back Clinton Portis getting a 5-yard touchdown run (with a failed 2-point conversion). New York tried to make a comeback as quarterback Eli Manning completed a 19-yard touchdown pass to tight end Kevin Boss. However, the wind and Washington's defense prevented any hopes.

Eli Manning set a record of futility in the game with 35 incomplete passes, setting a record for most incomplete passes in an NFL game since the AFL–NFL merger. In fairness to Manning, his receivers also did not play well, dropping at least eight of his passes. Washington quarterback Todd Collins, making his first NFL start since 1997 in place of the injured Jason Campbell, didn't play much better, going 8–25, but got the win.

With the loss, not only did the Giants fall to 9–5, but they also lost tight end Jeremy Shockey for the season in the third quarter with a broken left fibula. It would be his final appearance as a member of the Giants. Due to the Giants' increasing problems with Shockey's attitude and the emergence of Kevin Boss during the remainder of the season, he became expendable and was eventually traded to the New Orleans Saints.

=== Week 16: at Buffalo Bills ===
Quarter	1	2	3	4	Total
Giants	0	17	0	21	38
Bills	14	0	7	0	21

at Ralph Wilson Stadium, Orchard Park, New York

- Date: December 23
- Game time: 1:00 PM (EST)
- Game weather: 52 °F (11 °C), Rain And Wind
- Game attendance: 71,302
- Referee: Gene Steratore
- TV announcers (Fox): Kenny Albert (play-by-play), Daryl Johnson (color commentator), & Tony Siragusa (sideline reporter)
- Game Book

The Giants took their 6–1 road record to Buffalo in search of clinching a playoff spot. They were able to rebound nicely from the week 15 home loss to Washington with a 38–21 win over the Bills. The Giants utilized their running game to wear down the Bills, as Brandon Jacobs rushed for 143 yards and 2 touchdowns and rookie Ahmad Bradshaw rushed for 151 yards and a touchdown, including an 88-yard hustle that gave the Giants a 31–21 lead in the fourth quarter. Eli Manning had a rough day throwing the ball, as the harsh conditions forced him into completing just 7 of 16 passes and throwing for only 111 yards with two interceptions. Kawika Mitchell and Corey Webster also returned interceptions for touchdowns.

The Giants rallied early from a 14–0, first-quarter deficit to win a game played through rain, wind, and snow. Early on, it appeared that the Bills would dominate the game, with Trent Edwards finding Michael Gaines for a three-yard touchdown to make it 7–0. After the Giants punted, Edwards hit Lee Evans for a 4-yard touchdown to make it 14–0. As the weather changed from windy with no precipitation to windy and snowy, so did the Giants's fortunes. In the second quarter, Brandon Jacobs ran for a six-yard touchdown, then on the next drive had his longest run of the season, a 43-yard touchdown run to tie the game at 14. A Lawrence Tynes field goal made it 17–14 at the half.

In the third quarter, a Marshawn Lynch touchdown run and a goal line stand by the Bills made the score 21–17 Bills heading into the final quarter. However, the Giants ran away with the contest in the fourth. With 14:05 to go in the 4th, Trent Edwards's pass was deflected and intercepted by linebacker (and future Bill) Kawika Mitchell, who returned it 20 yards for a touchdown for the go-ahead score. With 6:27 to go, the Giants got the ball back on their own 12-yard line. During the second half, rookie 7th-round pick Ahmad Bradshaw, who seldom played outside of special teams before this game but who now had an opportunity due to Derrick Ward's injury and Reuben Droughns's declining play, checked into the game. Bradshaw (who, unusual for a Giant, played with a single "y" on one side of his helmet instead of the standard "ny" in this game) received a handoff towards the left side of the line, cut towards the left sideline, received a key block from receiver Plaxico Burress, and sprinted down the sideline 88 yards for a touchdown to make it 31–21. Bradshaw's run is the third-longest in Giants history, with Tiki Barber's 95-yard touchdown against the Raiders on New Year's Eve 2005 being the longest. Just three plays later, Trent Edwards was intercepted by cornerback Corey Webster, who returned Edwards's errant pass 34 yards for the game-clinching touchdown.

While Eli Manning played poorly again, going 7–15 for just 111 yards with two interceptions and four fumbles (two lost), Trent Edwards also had a poor performance, going just 9-26 for 161 yards. Although he threw for 2 touchdowns, he also threw 3 interceptions (2 returned for touchdowns) and fumbled twice (though both were recovered by other Bills), and was just 3–19 after his first two drives. Ahmad Bradshaw ran for 151 yards on just 17 carries, while Brandon Jacobs ran for a career-high 143 yards on 25 carries with 2 touchdowns. Another important stat to note is that all 59 points in the game were scored going towards the east end zone.

With the win, the Giants improved to 10–5 to clinch their third consecutive playoff berth. They also secured the 5th seed when the Washington Redskins defeated the Minnesota Vikings later that night.

=== Week 17: vs. New England Patriots ===
Quarter	1	2	3	4	Total
Patriots	3	13	7	15	38
Giants	7	14	7	7	35

at Giants Stadium, East Rutherford, New Jersey

- Date: December 29
- Game time: 8:15 PM EST
- Game weather: 44 °F (7 °C), Clear
- Game attendance: 79,110
- Referee: Mike Carey
- TV announcers (NFLN^{[a]}^{[b]}): Bryant Gumbel (play-by-play), Cris Collinsworth (color commentator), & Adam Schefter (sideline reporter)
- Game Book

This marked the first time since Super Bowl I that an NFL game was simulcast by more than one television network. It was the first time an NFL game was carried on three national networks (CBS, NBC, and NFL Network) with an additional 1.2 million viewers seeing the game on local stations in New York and Massachusetts. The game was originally scheduled to be broadcast on NFL Network only, but Roger Goodell allowed CBS and NBC to broadcast with NFL Network it due to the Patriots being 15–0 and needing just one more win to become the first team to go 16–0 in the regular season. There was disagreement surrounding head coach Tom Coughlin's decision to play all his starters. Some of them played injured, notably Plaxico Burress who had an ankle injury and missed most of practice during the end of the season and the Giants postseason run. A Giants win would have no effect in the playoffs the following Sunday, as the Giants had earned the #5 seed as a wildcard and Dallas had won the division with the best record in the NFC. By playing his starters, he risked losing additional players on an already banged up roster playing against a heavily favored Patriots team, which was playing for the history books to go undefeated in the regular season. Still, the Giants were the final team to have a chance to end the Patriots' shot at a perfect season, and a victory would be an impressive display for pride and momentum.

The Patriots set numerous offensive records while becoming the first ever 16–0 team in the regular season in a raucous and hostile Giants Stadium. Tom Brady set a single season record for touchdown passes, Randy Moss set a record for touchdown receptions, and the Patriots as a whole set a record for most points scored. Despite losing 38–35, the Giants played well and impressed critics in the defeat. Eli Manning played well, completing 22 of 32 passes for 251 yards while throwing 4 touchdowns and 1 interception, the lone interception of the game. The Giants led 28–16 in the third quarter, the Patriots' largest deficit this season. Also, Brandon Jacobs reached 1,000 yards rushing after gaining 67 yards on the ground on 15 carries. With the loss, the Giants ended the regular season at 10–6, with a road playoff game set on January 6 against the Tampa Bay Buccaneers. The game became in retrospect a preview of Super Bowl XLII.

In the end, 15.7 million viewers watched the game on CBS, 13.2 million on NBC, 4.5 million on the NFL Network, and 1.2 million on New York, Boston and Manchester, New Hampshire television stations. The game was the most watched program on television since the 2007 Academy Awards and the most watched regular season NFL game in more than 12 years.

In addition to NFL Network, CBS, and NBC, the game also aired on the local stations that were originally given exclusive simulcasting rights, including WCVB-TV in Boston, WMUR-TV in Manchester, New Hampshire, and WWOR-TV in New York City.

== Playoffs ==
Week	Date	Opponent (seed)	Result	Record	Game site	NFL.com recap
Wild Card	January 6	at Tampa Bay Buccaneers (4)	W 24–14	1–0	Raymond James Stadium	Recap
Divisional	January 13	at Dallas Cowboys (1)	W 21–17	2–0	Texas Stadium	Recap
NFC Championship	January 20	at Green Bay Packers (2)	W 23–20 (OT)	3–0	Lambeau Field	Recap
Super Bowl XLII	February 3	vs. New England Patriots (A1)	W 17–14	4–0	University of Phoenix Stadium	Recap

=== NFC Wild Card Game: at (4) Tampa Bay Buccaneers ===
Quarter	1	2	3	4	Total
Giants	0	14	3	7	24
Buccaneers	7	0	0	7	14

at Raymond James Stadium, Tampa, Florida

- Date: January 6
- Game time: 1:00 PM EST
- Game weather: 70 °F (21 °C), Sunny
- Game attendance: 65,621
- Referee: Walt Anderson
- TV announcers (Fox): Joe Buck (play-by-play), Troy Aikman (color commentator), Pam Oliver (sideline reporter) and Chris Myers (sideline reporter)
- Game Book

The Giants ended their postseason skid with a 24–14 victory over the #4 Tampa Bay Buccaneers. Eli Manning won his first career playoff game and Tom Coughlin won his first playoff game with the Giants. The Giants got off to a rough start, at the end of the first quarter they trailed 7–0 and had gained only −2 yards on offense. But the Giants responded with a pair of touchdowns in the second quarter to take a 14–7 lead heading into halftime. At the start of the second half, Micheal Spurlock of the Bucs fumbled the kickoff return, which was recovered by Corey Webster. The Giants were able to get a field goal off of the ensuing drive, extending their lead to 17–7. Later in the quarter, Webster intercepted a pass from Jeff Garcia in the end zone. In the fourth quarter, Manning threw a touchdown pass to Amani Toomer for a 24–7 lead. Garcia would lead the Bucs down the field on their next possession for a touchdown, but the damage had been done as the Bucs lost the game 24–14 after Garcia threw another interception late in the fourth quarter. Manning's final stat line was impressive: 20 of 27 for 185 yards, 2 touchdowns and no interceptions.

With the win, the Giants improved their overall record to 11–6.

=== NFC Divisional Playoffs: at (1) Dallas Cowboys ===
Quarter	1	2	3	4	Total
Giants	7	7	0	7	21
Cowboys	0	14	3	0	17

at Texas Stadium, Irving, Texas

- Date: January 13
- Game time: 4:30 PM EST
- Game weather: 59 °F (15 °C), Clear Skies
- Game attendance: 63,660
- Referee: Peter Morelli
- TV announcers (Fox): Joe Buck (play-by-play), Troy Aikman (color commentator), Pam Oliver (sideline reporter) and Chris Myers (sideline reporter)
- Game Book

The Giants advanced to the NFC Title Game for the first time since 2000 with a 21–17 victory over the top-seeded Dallas Cowboys. The Giants were not expected to win, or even give the Cowboys much difficulty, having lost both regular season games to the Cowboys. The Giants would have to deal with a hostile crowd as the Cowboys with the best record in the NFC had gained home field advantage throughout the playoffs. This meant the Cowboys had 2 weeks of rest to prepare for a team they played twice a year, while the lower seeded Wildcard Giants had to play against Tampa Bay in the Wildcard round of the playoffs. Making matters worse for the Giants, the Cowboys had #1 receiver Terrell Owens back after he had missed the last two games of the regular season due to an injury, and had #3 receiver Terry Glenn playing just his second game of the season after undergoing knee surgery. Dallas played ball control offense, a strategy the Giants are usually known for. The Cowboys won the battle for time of possession, having possession for far longer than the Giants. With a quick score, the Giants were able to overcome very long, time-consuming drives by the Cowboys in the win. Eli Manning had another good game, completing 66% of his passes with 12 out of 18 passes for 163 yards and throwing 2 touchdowns and no interceptions. Both of his TD passes were caught by veteran receiver Amani Toomer.

The game began with the Giants receiving an opening kickoff. After three Brandon Jacobs runs netted 20 yards, Eli Manning hit Amani Toomer on a crossing route towards the left sideline. Toomer then maneuvered past cornerback Anthony Henry before outrunning safeties Ken Hamlin and Roy Williams down the sideline for a 52-yard touchdown just 2:58 into the game.

Both teams then exchanged punts with the Cowboys starting a drive at their own 4-yard line. The Cowboys then went on a ten play, five minute drive that went 96 yards for the game-tying touchdown. Marion Barber, making his first start of the season after leading the Cowboys in rushing touchdowns on the season (combined with Julius Jones's declining performance), was the key factor for the drive, rushing for 72 yards on the drive including a 36-yard run. On the first play of the second quarter, Tony Romo threw a fade to Terrell Owens, who caught the ball and kept both feet in bounds for the touchdown. A Chris Canty sack of Eli Manning forced a punt on the Giants's next possession, and the Cowboys started their next drive on their own 10-yard line. The Cowboys went on a 20-play, 90-yard drive where they converted 5 third downs. Barber capped off the drive with a 1-yard touchdown plunge to make it 14–7 Cowboys with 1:01 to go in the first half.

With the Cowboys dominating the game at this point outside of the Giants's opening touchdown, the Giants needed at least a field goal in order to keep themselves in the game. Rookie receiver Steve Smith got the Giants going with two receptions for 33 yards, then Eli Manning found Kevin Boss on a corner route for 19 yards to put the Giants at the 4-yard line with 17 seconds left in the half. On the next play, Manning found Toomer on a crossing route, and he lunged into the end zone for the touchdown with 11 seconds left in the half. The score was tied at 14 at the half.

Though the Giants and Cowboys were tied at 14–14 heading into halftime, the second half was all about defense as both teams totaled 10 points in the second half. However early on, it looked to be more of the same from the Cowboys as they entered the red zone again on a 14 play drive taking up over 8 minutes of the clock. Finally, the Giants got a stop off a Cowboys miscue. On 3rd and 12 from the Giants's 16-yard line, Tony Romo had an open Terrell Owens crossing over the middle of the field, but he threw behind him, resulting in Dallas settling for Nick Folk's 33-yard field goal to make it 17–14. Giants kick returner Domenik Hixon returned the ensuing kickoff 45 yards, but in large part due to a sack by DeMarcus Ware, the Giants failed to get any points and punted. The Cowboys got the ball back when they made probably their worst play of the day. In the lead-up to the game, receiver Patrick Crayton declared that the Cowboys would be going to the Super Bowl. On a third down play, Romo was chased by the Giants pass rush and avoided them before finding a wide-open Crayton, but he dropped it. The play likely would have gone for a big gain had Crayton caught the pass, but instead, the Cowboys were forced to punt.

Veteran corner R. W. McQuarters returned the ensuing punt 25 yards, and this time, the Giants capitalized on their good field position. Manning went 3–4 to lead the Giants inside the 10-yard line, and then Giants bruising running back Brandon Jacobs scored the winning touchdown, overpowering a goal line stand by the Cowboys defense. As hated rivals in a hostile stadium, Jacobs continued running with the ball in the end zone and hit the playclock loudly, but avoided the unsportsmanlike conduct penalty that the celebration would earn today.

It didn't look like the winning touchdown, as there was still over 13 minutes left in the 4th quarter and Giants only led by 4 points, but the 4th quarter turned into a clock killing scoreless battle of opposing defenses. Bending without breaking, yardage had been allowed without points for either side. While the Giants failed to move the ball on their ensuing possessions, the Cowboys began to struggle offensively. Now trailing when they had been controlling the game for the majority of the contest, the Cowboys began to abandon their running attack. More crucially, however, the Giants pass rush began to assert itself. During the season, the Cowboys had been one of the best teams in the league in controlling the Giants's league-leading pass rush, but in the fourth quarter, the Giants broke through with Reggie Torbor and Kawika Mitchell both contributing sacks, and the team constantly forcing Tony Romo to rush throws. Romo became so rattled he committed an intentional grounding penalty with four minutes left, forcing a punt.

As the game reached its closing minutes, the Cowboys had possession with a final chance to win. Tony Romo began to lead the Cowboys down the field for a potential game-winning drive with a minute and a half left in the game. They successfully got to scoring position, although only a touchdown could win it with a 4-point deficit. On a third down play, Romo was rushed out of the pocket by the Giants pass rush again, but flipped the ball to tight end Jason Witten for an 18-yard gain to put the Cowboys at the 22-yard line. After a false start by Cowboys tackle Marc Colombo, a completion for 4 yards, and an incomplete pass, the Cowboys had 3rd and 11 at the 23-yard line with 21 seconds left with two chances to score a game-winning touchdown, when Patrick Crayton made another bad play. On third down, Romo threw incomplete for Crayton. While the pass appeared to be overthrown by Romo, replays showed that on the down, out, and up pattern that Crayton was supposed to run, he stopped on the "out" part of the route, then restarted for the "up" portion of the route, resulting in the overthrown pass. On fourth down, Romo threw over the middle for Terry Glenn, and his pass was intercepted by R. W. McQuarters with 9 seconds remaining. Manning kneeled on the next play, winning a huge unexpected upset of the heavily favored #1 seed Cowboys.

In large part due to their two touchdown-scoring drives, Dallas dominated the game statistically, outgaining the Giants 336–230 and controlling the ball for 36:30 compared to the Giants's 23:30. However, the Cowboys committed 11 penalties compared to just three by the Giants, and while Romo outgained Manning through the air, Manning's QB rating for the game was 132.4 compared to Romo's 64.7.

The Giants were headed to Green Bay to play the Green Bay Packers on January 20 for the NFC Championship and a spot in Super Bowl XLII. However, The Cowboys were considered the team widely expected to represent the NFC in the Super Bowl, and the NFC championship game was expected to be played in Dallas, not Green Bay, as the Packers had earned the #2 seed. This was because the Packers had lost to the Cowboys during the regular season. With the big win over Dallas, the Giants had suddenly changed all expectations, and improved their overall record to 12–6. This set a matchup the following week against the also heavily favored Packers, who were 14–3 after a 42–20 victory over the Seattle Seahawks in the Divisional round, and additionally had soundly defeated the Giants in New York in week 2, 35–13.

=== NFC Championship Game: at (2) Green Bay Packers ===
Quarter	1	2	3	4	OT	Total
Giants	3	3	14	0	3	23
Packers	0	10	7	3	0	20

at Lambeau Field, Green Bay, Wisconsin

- Date: January 20
- Game time: 6:30 PM EST
- Game weather: −1 °F (−18 °C), Clear
- Game attendance: 72,740
- Referee: Terry McAulay
- TV announcers (Fox): Joe Buck (play-by-play), Troy Aikman (color commentator), Pam Oliver (sideline reporter) and Chris Myers (sideline reporter)
- Game Book

After their big win over the Dallas Cowboys, the Giants traveled to Lambeau Field to face the second-seeded Green Bay Packers on a freezing night. With a gametime temperature of -1 degree and a -23 degree windchill, it was the third-coldest NFL game in terms of windchill, behind the 1967 Ice Bowl between the Cowboys and the Packers and the January 1982 Freezer Bowl between the Chargers and the Bengals (which holds the record with a -59 degree windchill). While the Giants were steadily gaining more respect throughout the league after their upset of the Cowboys, most analysts and pundits predicted the Packers to win and represent the NFC in the Super Bowl.

The Packers won the toss and received the opening kickoff, but after two Brett Favre completions, the Packers failed to move the ball further and punted. The Giants offense opened the game with running back Brandon Jacobs plowing into cornerback Charles Woodson on a five-yard run. With the help of three receptions by receiver Plaxico Burress, the Giants entered the red zone when they survived a potential turnover. While being held by a lineman on a third-down play, Eli Manning threw the ball straight to lineman Cullen Jenkins, but he dropped the potential interception, and instead the Giants got on the board first with kicker Lawrence Tynes getting a 29-yard field goal. The Giants kept the ball for most of the 1st quarter, leading 3–0 at the end of the quarter.

In the 2nd quarter, the Packers defense shut the Giants' passing game down after two more completions to Plaxico Burress, so the Giants settled for another Tynes field goal at 11:41 left in the half. The Giants led 6–0, and appeared to be in good position for their next drive when Koren Robinson muffed the ensuing kickoff and fell on it at the Packers's 10-yard line. However, on the first play of the Packers' next drive, Brett Favre pump-faked, then threw a 90-yard TD pass to Donald Driver, who had beaten blown coverage by cornerback Corey Webster before outrunning safety Gibril Wilson down the right sideline, and the Packers led 7–6. The teams then exchanged punts before the Packers received great field position at the Giants's 47-yard line. The Packers advanced into the red zone and faced a 3rd and 8 from the Giants 19-yard line. Favre found backup running back Brandon Jackson in the flat with lineman Jason Spitz out in front to block, but somehow, middle linebacker Antonio Pierce grabbed hold of Jackson to prevent him from advancing before Dave Tollefson could help him make the tackle. Green Bay settled for kicker Mason Crosby making a 36-yard field goal to give the Packers a 10–6 lead with 1:34 left in the half. On the Giants's next drive, Manning found Burress deep for a 32-yard pass on his 7th reception of the day, but an A. J. Hawk sack on fourth down prevented the Giants from scoring. The Packers led 10–6 at the half.

The Giants got the ball first in the 3rd quarter, and had a successful drive that ended with a Brandon Jacobs 1-yard TD run. The Giants led 13–10. This drive nearly ended with an interception with Al Harris intercepting another Eli Manning pass intended for Burress, but he committed pass interference to make the interception, so the play was nullified. In the next Packers drive, after a Sam Madison penalty, Brett Favre threw a 12-yard TD pass to tight end Donald Lee. The Packers led 17–13. The Giants responded in their next drive by driving to the four-yard line after a 23-yard reception by Amani Toomer (which was challenged by Green Bay and upheld). From the Packers's 4-yard line, Manning then handed off to Ahmad Bradshaw, who went off tackle right but got caught in a stalemate at the one-yard line. In a heads-up play, right tackle Kareem McKenzie grabbed Bradshaw and dragged him into the end zone with him, resulting in a touchdown. The Giants led 20–17 with 2:12 left in the 3rd quarter.

For the remainder of regulation, the game would be defined by potentially crushing mistakes by the Giants that prevented them from entirely capitalizing on the Packers's failures to penetrate the Giants defense. On the next drive, Brett Favre avoided the Giants pass rush and threw an interception to R. W. McQuarters, but McQuarters never went down and was fumbled upon being tackled, with the loose ball bouncing straight to offensive lineman Mark Tauscher at the 19-yard line. The Giants defense held, and with 11:46 left in the game, Packers kicker Mason Crosby hit a 37-yard field goal to tie the game at 20–20. On the Giants' next drive, after not converting for a 1st down, the Giants were at 4th and 5. The Giants failed to convert, however a Packers penalty gave the Giants a 1st down. the Giants advanced to the Packers's 28-yard line when Eli Manning went for the touchdown to Plaxico Burress, when Al Harris finally made a play and broke up the pass. The Giants then went for a field goal, but with 6:49 left in the game, Lawrence Tynes missed a 43-yard field goal attempt. The Packers's next two drives went three-and-out before they punted to the Giants with 2:30 left. Packers punter Jon Ryan's next punt went only 31 yards to the Packers's 48-yard line, but R. W. McQuarters fumbled the punt return, with Domenik Hixon saving a turnover by recovering the ball at the 48-yard line. On the next play, Ahmad Bradshaw broke through the Packers's defense for what appeared to be a 48-yard touchdown run, but the play was nullified due to a holding penalty. Undaunted, Manning found Steve Smith for completions of 14 and 11 yards before the Giants killed time for Lawrence Tynes to attempt a game-winning 36-yard field goal. On the last play of regulation, however, Giants long snapper Jay Alford had a low snap, and Tynes shanked the kick wide left on an attempt that was not even close to the uprights. The Giants and Packers went into overtime with the game tied at 20–20. The Packers won the coin toss and got the ball first.

For much of the game, cornerback Corey Webster had been playing with a massive chip on his shoulder. While the Giants coaches had tried to encourage him and assure him that he would get another opportunity, he remained angry over his poor play resulting in Brett Favre's 90-yard touchdown to Donald Driver and wanted to make a big play to make up for it. He finally got an opportunity on the second play of overtime. The Packers called an out pattern play for Driver, where Donald Lee would shift to fullback and attempt to deceive the Giants defense into believing that he would be a lead blocker on a running play (they had previously called this play twice before in the game, with the play being successful both times). Favre dropped back, and in a bonehead play that helped to define his legacy as a "gunslinger," threw the ball straight towards Webster, who was in position against Driver. Webster took advantage of his long-awaited opportunity and intercepted the pass, and went five yards before Driver dragged him down, which gave the Giants the ball in Packer territory. The Giants failed to convert on 3rd down and decided to go for the field goal. Although he had missed his previous two attempts, Tynes, like Webster before him, also wanted another opportunity and sprinted straight onto the field for a 47-yard attempt with 12:29 left in OT. Before Tynes's attempt, no kicker had made a field goal of over 40 yards with the game time temperature below freezing. Tynes's attempt initially went wide of the right goalpost, but the wind hooked it left and the kick went just over the crossbar for the game-winning field goal, and the Giants became the 2007 NFC Champions.

The Giants beat the Packers, 23–20. The Giants victory was the first championship win over the Packers since 1938. The Packers have a 4–2 record over the Giants in NFL/NFC Championship series. The win also marked the Giants' 10th straight road win and their 4th straight NFC Championship victory.

For the Giants, Eli Manning went 21–40 for 251 yards. Although he didn't throw a touchdown, he avoided an interception for the third straight playoff game. It was generally agreed by critics after the game that he outplayed Favre, making another instance where he outplayed a quarterback considered far superior to him in the lead-up to the contest. Brandon Jacobs added 67 yards on 21 carries with a touchdown, while Ahmad Bradshaw ran 16 times for 63 yards and a touchdown. Plaxico Burress caught 11 passes for 151 yards. Along with his 200+ yard receiving performance in 2002 against the Falcons while a member of the Steelers, it is considered by many to be his single greatest game as a receiver.

While the Giants defense didn't have a sack in this contest, they held the Packers to just 28 yards rushing. Former Giants running back Ryan Grant, who had run for 201 yards against the Seahawks the previous week, ran for just 29 yards against his former team.

The game was Brett Favre's final game as a Green Bay Packer, with whom he played with for 16 seasons. He appeared to retire for good during the offseason, but instead announced just before the season started that he wanted to play again. Because the Packers spent the offseason after the retirement announcement preparing Aaron Rodgers for the starting job, Favre became expendable and was traded to the Jets.

During the game, Giants coach Tom Coughlin caught frostbite. His increasingly red face due to the freezing conditions and frostbite received considerable attention from TV cameras during the game.

The New York Giants were headed to Super Bowl XLII to face the 2007 AFC Champions New England Patriots who were undefeated at 18–0. on February 3, 2008.

=== Super Bowl XLII: vs. (A1) New England Patriots ===
Quarter	1	2	3	4	Total
Giants	3	0	0	14	17
Patriots	0	7	0	7	14

at University of Phoenix Stadium, Glendale, Arizona

- Date: February 3
- Game time: 6:31 p.m. EST/4:31 p.m. MST
- Game weather: Dome
- Game attendance: 71,101
- Referee: Mike Carey
- TV announcers (Fox): Joe Buck (play-by-play), Troy Aikman (color commentator), Pam Oliver and Chris Myers (sideline reporters).
- Game Book

Two weeks after their NFC Championship victory over the Packers, the Giants flew to the University of Phoenix Stadium for Super Bowl XLII against the undefeated AFC Champions, the New England Patriots, in a rematch of Week 17. That game had ended with the Patriots winning a very close game after coming back, and would prove to be a sign of things to come, but with a reverse ending.

After calling tails to win the coin toss, the Giants started the game with the longest opening drive in Super Bowl history, a 16-play, 77-yard march that consumed 9 minutes, 59 seconds and featured four third-down conversions, the most ever on a Super Bowl opening drive. But New England halted the drive at their own 14-yard line, where New York delivered the first punch with kicker Lawrence Tynes nailing a 32-yard field goal for the only score of the period.

In the second quarter, the Patriots responded with RB Laurence Maroney getting a 1-yard TD run for the only score of the period. After a scoreless third quarter, the Giants regained the lead with QB Eli Manning completing a 5-yard TD pass to WR David Tyree. New England retook the lead with QB Tom Brady completing a 6-yard TD pass to WR Randy Moss. Afterwards, with only 2 minutes and 40 seconds left, Manning led his Giants from their own 17-yard line all the way to the Patriots' 13-yard line, featuring a 4th down conversion (a one-yard run by Brandon Jacobs on 4th and inches) and even Eli escaping a sure-fire sack & completing a 32-yard pass to Tyree, where he would hook up with WR Plaxico Burress for the game-winning TD pass. The defense after that didn't even allow a single yard, as Brady was sacked once and threw 3 incomplete passes, turning the ball over on downs.

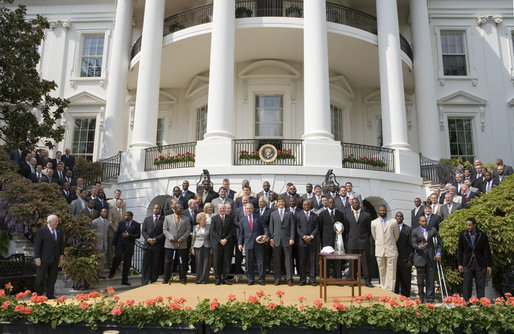
The Giants visiting the White House in honor of their Super Bowl victory on April 30, 2008.

With the win, the Giants finished their championship season with an overall record of 14–6. They became the third team (after the 1993 Cowboys and 2001 Patriots) to win the Super Bowl after beginning the season 0–2 and were the first NFC Wild Card to win the Super Bowl. The victory also gave them their 11th-straight road win (an NFL record).

Eli Manning was named the game's MVP after completing 19 of 34 passes for 255 yards, 2 touchdowns, and an interception; a majority of his offense came in the decisive fourth quarter, completing nine of 14 passes for 152 yards and both touchdowns. The defense had a stellar performance, sacking Patriots QB Tom Brady five times.

Coach Tom Coughlin became the third oldest head coach to win the Super Bowl (61 years and 156 days). Punter Jeff Feagles was the oldest player to play in a Super Bowl, let alone win one.

Eli and Peyton Manning became the first brother QBs to become back-to-back Super Bowl winners and Super Bowl MVPs.

== Season facts ==
- The New York Giants lost to the Dallas Cowboys (twice), Green Bay Packers, and New England Patriots in the regular season but defeated them all in the post-season. In fact, the Minnesota Vikings are the only team that the Giants played during the 2007 season that the Giants did not defeat at least once (The Vikings did not make the playoffs and defeated the Giants in their only meeting during the regular season)
- Of the New York Giants 10 victories the combined record of all teams were 60–100 (.375).
- Of the New York Giants 10 victories 7 games were against teams below .500 that had a combined record of 35–77 (.313).
- Of the New York Giants 10 victories 3 games were against teams above .500 that had a combined record of 25–23 (.521).
- Of the New York Giants 6 losses the combined record of all teams were 51–29 (.638).
- Of the New York Giants 4 post-season victories the combined record of all opponents (including playoffs) were 54–13 (.806).
- The New York Giants combined regular season opponents records were 102–106 (.490).
- The New York Giants total regular and post-season opponents (TB 9–7, playoffs only: GB 1–0 & NE 2–0) records were 114–113 (.502).
- Peyton and Eli Manning are the first brothers to be named MVP of the Super Bowl, at the same position, and in back-to-back years.
- The New York Giants trailed in all four post-season games, coming back to win all four. The Giants trailed in the fourth quarter in 2 out of the 4 games.
- The Giants NFC Championship victory was their first win over the Packers in the playoffs since 1938. The Packers have a 4–2 record over the Giants in NFL/NFC Championship series.
- The New York Giants played the New England Patriots at the end of the pre-season, regular season and post-season (Super Bowl XLII) during the 2007 season. This marks the third time that the Giants played a team that they would later face in the Super Bowl. Their record is 1–2 against these opponents in the regular season and 3–0 in the Super Bowl.
- Ended the season with an 11-game road winning streak including playoffs. (the Week 8 game in London vs. the Dolphins and Super Bowl XLII in Arizona were both considered "away" games for the Giants. The Week 5 game vs. the Jets in Giants Stadium was considered a "home" game for the Giants.)
- Prevented the Patriots from achieving what would have been the second undefeated season, and the first 19–0 season. (The first, and to date the only, was the 1972 Miami Dolphins, although they finished 17–0)
- Had only one starting Pro Bowler (Osi Umenyiora), fewest among Super Bowl champs.
- All of their post-season games were announced by Joe Buck and Troy Aikman, due to each game being the perceived "marquee matchup" for Fox's coverage slate, along with the network holding broadcast rights for Super Bowl XLII.
- The only time the Giants and the Buccaneers met in the 2007 season was in the postseason.

== Super Bowl XLII DVD ==
The official DVD of Super Bowl XLII was released on February 26, 2008. The DVD covered the entire 2007 New York Giants season, as well as special features including the NFL Network postgame commentary, the halftime show in its entirety, the Media Day highlights, the NFC Divisional Game and NFC Championship Game highlights, profiles on Mathias Kiwanuka and Tom Coughlin, and features on Eli Manning and Michael Strahan.

== Stomp You Out ==
"Stomp You Out" was the unofficial team motto of the 2007 New York Giants - especially their defense, which led the NFL with 52 sacks that season. It was started and perpetuated by Michael Strahan, saying he wanted to stomp out all of his opponents. During their playoff run, a relatively unknown motto was catapulted to national exposure as the Giants kept winning. The phrase remains a rallying cry for Giants fans to this day, much to the chagrin of their opponents, especially the Dallas Cowboys and the New England Patriots. At Strahan's 2014 Hall of Fame induction speech, he said, "Not only did we win the game [Super Bowl XLII], but we stomped them out!" much to the delight of Giants fans and players present.

== See also ==
- List of New York Giants seasons
