= Reggie Torbor =

American football player (born 1981)

No. 53, 58
- Position: Linebacker

Personal information
- Born: January 25, 1981 (age 45); Baton Rouge, Louisiana, U.S.
- Listed height: 6 ft 2 in (1.88 m)
- Listed weight: 254 lb (115 kg)

Career information
- High school: Robert E. Lee (Baton Rouge)
- College: Auburn
- NFL draft: 2004: 4th round, 97th overall pick

Career history
- New York Giants (2004–2007); Miami Dolphins (2008–2009); Buffalo Bills (2010–2011)

Awards and highlights
- Super Bowl champion (XLII); Second-team All-SEC (2003)

Career NFL statistics
- Total tackles: 250
- Sacks: 6.5
- Forced fumbles: 4
- Fumble recoveries: 2
- Interceptions: 2
- Stats at Pro Football Reference

Reggie Jermaine Torbor (born January 25, 1981) is an American former professional football player who was a linebacker in the National Football League (NFL). He played college football for the Auburn Tigers and was selected by the New York Giants in the fourth round of the 2004 NFL draft.

Torbor also played for the Miami Dolphins and Buffalo Bills. He earned a Super Bowl ring with the Giants in Super Bowl XLII beating the New England Patriots.

== Early life ==
Torbor attended and played high school football for Robert E. Lee High School in Baton Rouge, Louisiana, where he was a running back and linebacker. He rushed for 1,563 yards and 10 touchdowns as a junior while accumulating 1,241 yards and 14 touchdowns a senior on his way to an All-State selection. He finished his high school career with 18 sacks.

== College career ==
Following high school, Torbor attended Auburn University, where he was a four-year letterman in football. He appeared in all 13 games for the team as a senior, recording 38 tackles (15 for a loss), 10.5 sacks, four forced fumbles and a fumble recovery on his way to Second-team All-SEC honors. He finished his collegiate career with 46 games played (22 starts), 120 tackles, 32 tackles for a loss, 19.5 sacks, 10 passes defensed, five forced fumbles, three fumble recoveries and a blocked kick. His sack total ranked him fifth in school history at the time of his departure.

== Professional career ==
Pre-draft measurables
Height	Weight	40-yard dash	20-yard shuttle	Three-cone drill	Vertical jump	Broad jump	Bench press
6 ft 2 in (1.88 m)	254 lb (115 kg)	4.65 s	4.46 s	7.48 s	34 in (0.86 m)	10 ft 0 in (3.05 m)	16 reps
All values from NFL Combine.

=== New York Giants ===
Torbor was drafted by the New York Giants in the fourth round (97th overall) of the 2004 NFL draft. He wore No. 58 with the team during his rookie season.

During his rookie season in 2004, Torbor appeared in all 16 games while starting one. His first NFL start came against the Washington Redskins on September 19. In a December 12 contest against the Baltimore Ravens, Torbor sacked quarterback Kyle Boller and forced a fumble that was recovered by defensive end Osi Umenyiora and returned 50 yards for a touchdown. In the season finale against the Dallas Cowboys he recorded half a sack and recovered a Vinny Testaverde fumble that lead to a Giants touchdown. Torbor finished the year with 21 tackles, three sacks (all in the final four games of the season), two forced fumbles and a fumble recovery.

Prior to the 2005 season, Torbor switched from No. 58 to No. 53. He was also inactive for the team's first-round playoff game against the Carolina Panthers after undergoing hernia surgery. He earned a starting job during the preseason, but was benched for ineffective play during the team's Week 3 contest. He went on to appear in 14 games, starting nine, while missing two. On the year, he recorded 34 tackles, an interception, three passes defensed, a forced fumble and a fumble recovery. His interception came off St. Louis Rams quarterback Marc Bulger while his fumble recovery came against Dallas Cowboys quarterback Drew Bledsoe.

In 2006, Torbor appeared in all 16 regular season games for the Giants while starting one, despite it being was reported during the preseason he was a long shot to make the team. On defense, he recorded 16 tackles, a sack and a forced fumble. He also added 14 special teams tackles, which tied him with fellow linebacker Chase Blackburn for the team lead. His forced fumble, which was recovered by safety Gibril Wilson, came against running back Travis Henry and the Tennessee Titans on November 26.

A restricted free agent in the 2007 offseason, Torbor received a fourth-round tender from the Giants. This meant that any team that signed Torbor would have to give the Giants a fourth-round pick in the 2007 NFL draft as compensation. He signed his tender on May 3.

That season, Torbor went on to appear in all 16 games for the Giants for the second straight season, and started six of them. All six of his regular season starts, and his four subsequent starts, were in place of injured linebacker Mathias Kiwanuka. On the season, he recorded 29 tackles, a sack and a pass defensed on defense while adding seven tackles on special teams. During the playoffs, he sacked quarterback Tony Romo in the team's divisional win over the Dallas Cowboys. He finished the postseason with 10 tackles and a sack, including two tackles in the Giants' Super Bowl XLII victory over the New England Patriots.

=== Miami Dolphins ===
After his contract expired with the Giants, Torbor became an unrestricted free agent in the 2008 offseason. On February 29, Torbor agreed to terms on a four-year, $14 million contract with the Miami Dolphins.

During the 2008 offseason, it was reported that Torbor was projected to start for the Dolphins at inside linebacker alongside Channing Crowder, but would face pressure from Akin Ayodele.

Torbor was released on May 27, 2010.

=== Buffalo Bills ===
Torbor signed with the Buffalo Bills on June 5, 2010. He started 10 games in 2010, recording 41 tackles. In 2011, during training camp, he injured his shoulder and was later placed on injured reserve.

== NFL career statistics ==
Legend
**Bold**	Career high

=== Regular season ===
Year	Team	Games		Tackles					Interceptions					Fumbles			
Year	Team	GP	GS	Cmb	Solo	Ast	Sck	TFL	Int	Yds	TD	Lng	PD	FF	FR	Yds	TD
2004	NYG	**16**	1	41	31	10	**3.0**	5	0	0	0	0	0	**2**	**1**	0	0
2005	NYG	14	**9**	**45**	**34**	11	0.0	**6**	**1**	**37**	0	**37**	3	1	**1**	0	0
2006	NYG	**16**	3	30	23	7	1.0	2	0	0	0	0	1	1	0	0	0
2007	NYG	**16**	5	39	27	12	1.0	2	0	0	0	0	1	0	0	0	0
2008	MIA	**16**	1	17	12	5	0.5	1	0	0	0	0	0	0	0	0	0
2009	MIA	**16**	2	37	28	9	1.0	**6**	**1**	0	0	0	**4**	0	0	0	0
2010	BUF	10	7	41	23	**18**	0.0	1	0	0	0	0	**4**	0	0	0	0
		104	28	250	178	72	6.5	23	2	37	0	37	13	4	2	0	0

=== Playoffs ===
Year	Team	Games		Tackles					Interceptions					Fumbles			
Year	Team	GP	GS	Cmb	Solo	Ast	Sck	TFL	Int	Yds	TD	Lng	PD	FF	FR	Yds	TD
2006	NYG	1	0	2	1	1	0.0	0	0	0	0	0	0	0	0	0	0
2007	NYG	**4**	**4**	**11**	**7**	**4**	**1.0**	**2**	0	0	0	0	0	0	0	0	0
2008	MIA	1	0	2	2	0	0.0	0	0	0	0	0	0	0	0	0	0
		6	4	15	10	5	1.0	2	0	0	0	0	0	0	0	0	0

== Family ==
Torbor and his wife Michelle have two sons, Reggie Jr. and Cameron
