= Rodney Burgess =

American football player (born 1984)

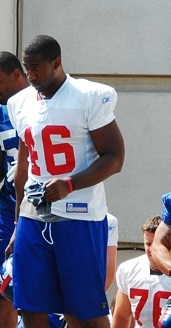

No. 46
- Position: Tight end/wide receiver/linebacker

Personal information
- Born: November 27, 1984 (age 41); Irmo, South Carolina, U.S.
- Listed height: 6 ft 4 in (1.93 m)
- Listed weight: 230 lb (104 kg)

Career information
- High school: Irmo (SC) Dutch Fork
- College: Coastal Carolina
- NFL draft: 2007: undrafted

Career history
- New York Giants (2007); Milwaukee Iron (2010)*
- * Offseason or practice squad member only

Rodney Burgess (born November 27, 1984) is an American former football tight end.

Burgess played college football at Coastal Carolina University and was originally pursued by the Detroit Lions, Minnesota Vikings, and Washington Redskins after the draft. He signed with the Lions on May 4, 2007, but was released in mid-May. The Giants signed him nine days later. He was then waived by the Giants in August.

He later signed with the Milwaukee Mustangs of the AFL.

In 2011, Burgess got a job with Dish Network and sought a new career as a personal trainer.
