= Dek Bake =

American football defensive end (born 1984)

No. 77, 92
- Position: Defensive end

Personal information
- Born: February 6, 1984 (age 42); Sacramento, California, U.S.
- Listed height: 6 ft 5 in (1.96 m)
- Listed weight: 272 lb (123 kg)

Career information
- College: Texas Tech
- NFL draft: 2007: undrafted

Career history
- New York Giants (2007); Saskatchewan Roughriders (2008)

Donald "Dek" Bake (born February 6, 1984) is an American former professional football defensive end who was formerly a member of the Saskatchewan Roughriders.

He was signed by the New York Giants as an undrafted free agent in 2007, but spent the entire campaign on the injured reserve list.

== Career ==
Bake played high school football at Cordova High School in Rancho Cordova, California. He played college football at Texas Tech University under renowned head coach Mike Leach. He later played for the New York Giants under head coach Tom Coughlin and was a member of the team that won Super Bowl XLII against the New England Patriots.

He was inducted into the Rancho Cordova Sports Hall of Fame and the Fresno City College Football Wall of Fame.

== Post-career ==
Bake graduated from the CEO Executive Program at the University of California, Berkeley's Haas School of Business. Bake is the founder and president of Fair Trade Real Estate, a real estate firm in California.
