= Brandon Jacobs =

American football player (born 1982)

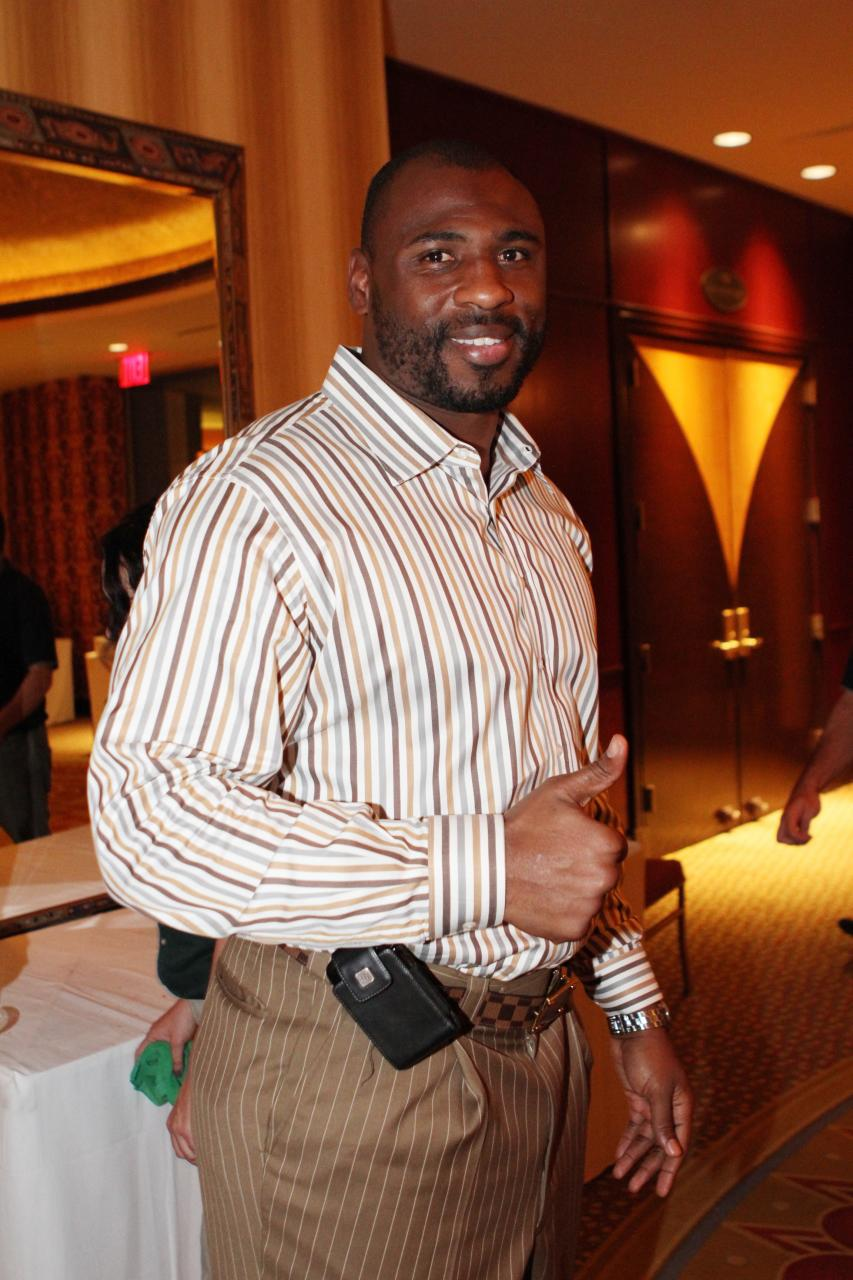
- Jacobs in 2011

No. 27, 45, 34
- Position: Running back

Personal information
- Born: July 6, 1982 (age 44); Houma, Louisiana, U.S.
- Listed height: 6 ft 4 in (1.93 m)
- Listed weight: 264 lb (120 kg)

Career information
- High school: Assumption (Napoleonville, Louisiana)
- College: Coffeyville (2001–2002); Auburn (2003); Southern Illinois (2004)
- NFL draft: 2005: 4th round, 110th overall pick

Career history
- New York Giants (2005–2011); San Francisco 49ers (2012); New York Giants (2013)

Awards and highlights
- 2× Super Bowl champion (XLII, XLVI); 69th greatest New York Giant of all-time

Career NFL statistics
- Rushing yards: 5,094
- Rushing average: 4.5
- Rushing touchdowns: 60
- Receptions: 82
- Receiving yards: 743
- Receiving touchdowns: 4
- Stats at Pro Football Reference

Brandon Christopher Jacobs (born July 6, 1982) is an American former professional football player who was a running back in the National Football League (NFL), primarily with the New York Giants. He played college football for the Auburn Tigers and Southern Illinois Salukis. He was selected by the Giants in the fourth round of the 2005 NFL draft, and won two Super Bowl rings with the team, both against the New England Patriots. He also played one season for the San Francisco 49ers before returning to New York for his final season.

Jacobs was taller and heavier than the average NFL running back, standing at 6 feet 4 inches (1.93 m) and weighing 264 pounds (120 kg). He also ran the 100 meters in 10.82 seconds and the 200 meters in 21.59 seconds. He won two Super Bowls in seven seasons with the New York Giants, and holds the franchise record for most career rushing touchdowns, as well as ranking fourth-most in career rushing yards.

== Early life ==
Brandon Jacobs grew up in Napoleonville, Louisiana. He was raised by his mother and her sisters. His aunt and uncle later became his legal guardians. He never had a relationship with his father. Brandon played basketball and football at Assumption High School. In his senior year, he received accolades such as USA Today All-America, Orlando Sentinel All-Southern, Prep Star All-Region and Louisiana Class 4A Most Valuable Offensive Player. He ran for more than 3,000 yards and scored 38 touchdowns in that senior campaign.

== College career ==
=== Coffeyville Community College ===
Jacobs's college career started at Coffeyville Community College in Coffeyville, Kansas, under the direction of head coach Jeff Leiker and running backs coach Dickie Rolls. Coffeyville is a member school of the Kansas Jayhawk Community College Conference. In 2001, his freshman year at Coffeyville, he ran for 1,349 yards and 17 touchdowns and gained Kansas Jayhawk Conference All-Conference honorable mention. He was also named the team MVP for CCC. In his sophomore season for the Red Ravens he racked up 1,896 yards and 20 touchdowns on 267 carries for a 7.1 yard-per-carry average. In light of these efforts Jacobs was named a JUCO All-American and to the KJCCC All-Conference First-team. He once again garnered the Team MVP trophy and was also named the recipient of the Reb Russell Memorial Football Scholarship Award. The statistic of 1,896 yards rushing ranks second all-time on the Ravens individual season rushing yardage record.

=== Auburn ===
Jacobs continued his college career at Auburn University, along with first-round draft picks Carnell Williams, Ronnie Brown, and Jason Campbell. Jacobs was the third-string running back behind Williams and Brown. Jacobs gained 446 yards on 72 carries and 2 touchdowns in 2003 for the Tigers.

=== Southern Illinois ===
After the completion of the 2003 college football season, Jacobs transferred to then Division I-AA Southern Illinois. Jacobs' one year at Southern Illinois was another solid one. He led the team with 150 carries for 992 yards (6.6 avg) and 19 touchdowns, one less than the school's all-time leader, Muhammad Abdulqaadir, who, like Jacobs, also played at Coffeyville Community College. Jacobs was an All-American first-team selection by The NFL Draft Report and All-Gateway Conference first-team choice and was also named Gateway Conference Newcomer of the Year. He led the conference and ranked tenth in the nation in scoring, averaging 9.5 points per game. Jacobs had eight receptions for 83 yards (10.4 avg), returned six kickoffs for 140 yards (23.3 avg) and had five 100-yard rushing games including the playoffs.

== Professional career ==
=== 2005 NFL draft ===
Jacobs was graded the 11th best running back available in the 2005 NFL draft by Sports Illustrated. He was projected an early fourth round pick.

Pre-draft measurables
Height	Weight	Arm length	Hand span	40-yard dash	10-yard split	20-yard split	20-yard shuttle	Three-cone drill	Vertical jump	Broad jump	Bench press
6 ft 4 1/4 in (1.94 m)	267 lb (121 kg)	33 5/8 in (0.85 m)	10 5/8 in (0.27 m)	4.56 s	1.69 s	2.72 s	4.49 s	7.54 s	37.0 in (0.94 m)	9 ft 10 in (3.00 m)	19 reps
All values from NFL Combine

=== New York Giants ===
The New York Giants selected Jacobs in the fourth round (110th overall) of the 2005 NFL draft.

On July 26, 2005, the New York Giants signed Jacobs to a four—year, $1.84 million rookie contract that included an initial signing bonus of $455,000.

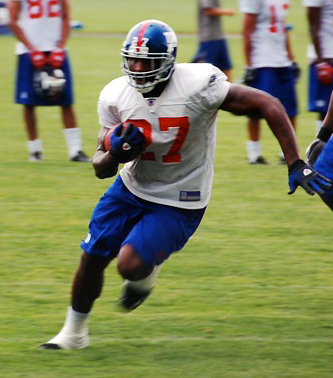
Brandon Jacobs during the 2007 training camp

As a rookie, Jacobs did not receive much playing time behind incumbent starter Tiki Barber, carrying the ball only 38 times for 99 yards, playing almost exclusively in short yardage situations. He did, however, score 7 touchdowns, second on the team.

Going into the 2006 season, Jacobs stated that he studied film of famed power running back Eddie George in an effort to refine his running style. George, like Jacobs, was a large, powerful running back. In the 2006 season, Jacobs carried the ball 96 times for 423 yards and nine touchdowns, averaging 4.4 yards per carry. He added 11 receptions for 149 yards.

With Barber's retirement, Jacobs took over the starting running back spot for the Giants in the 2007 season. He injured his knee in the first game of the season against the Dallas Cowboys, but returned four weeks later against the New York Jets to rush for 100 yards and a touchdown. Jacobs would miss two more games later in the season with a hamstring injury, but finish the regular season with rushing totals of 1,009 yards and four touchdowns on 201 carries. He also added 23 receptions for 174 yards and two touchdowns. Jacobs scored the winning touchdown against the Dallas Cowboys in the NFC Divisional Playoffs. Jacobs started every game in the playoffs as the Giants won Super Bowl XLII.

Jacobs underwent wrist surgery during the 2008 offseason. He returned to play all of the preseason, but missed two games in the regular season due to recurring difficulty with his knee. He finished the 2008 regular season with 219 carries for 1089 yards and 15 touchdowns, similar yardage to 2007, but many more touchdowns. In 2008, he and Derrick Ward became the fifth pair of teammates to rush for 1,000 yards in a single season.

He was the "Earth" in the running back corps of the Giants nicknamed "Earth, Wind, & Fire" with Derrick Ward (Wind) and Ahmad Bradshaw (Fire). He is also nicknamed Juggernaut because of his ability to break multiple tackles and the difficulty in bringing him down due to his impressive size for a running back. Similarly, he has been dubbed "The Creator" by the satirical sports website Ramon Hernandez Put Down The Gun, and is considered complementary to Justin Tuck, who is known as "The Destroyer."

On February 13, 2009, the Giants placed the Franchise Tag on Jacobs. He signed a four-year, $25 million contract with the Giants a week later and had most of the carries that season.

On December 31, 2009, Jacobs was placed on injured reserve due to a knee injury.

On September 19, 2010, Jacobs threw his helmet into the stands at Lucas Oil Stadium and was fined $10,000.

On November 24, 2010, Jacobs was announced back as the number one running back for the Giants against the Jacksonville Jaguars.

At the end of the 2011 season, Jacobs and the Giants appeared in Super Bowl XLVI. He had 9 carries for 37 yards as the Giants defeated the New England Patriots by a score of 21–17.

The Giants released Jacobs on March 9, 2012.

=== San Francisco 49ers ===
Jacobs signed with the San Francisco 49ers on March 28, 2012. He missed the first two months of the season after suffering a knee injury during training camp, and saw limited playing time once he returned. He was active for two games and had five carries for seven yards as essentially the third- or fourth-string tailback.

The 49ers suspended him for the final three games of the same season following a series of posts by Jacobs on social media sites addressing his lack of playing time, including one which said he was "on this team rotting away." Jacobs was waived by the 49ers on December 31, 2012.

=== New York Giants (second stint) ===
Jacobs signed a one-year contract with the New York Giants on September 10, 2013. In which he played in 7 games, rushing for 238 yards on 58 carries for a 4.1 yard average and 4 touchdowns. On January 2, 2014, Jacobs announced his retirement after nine seasons.

On May 27, 2021, Jacobs announced on Twitter that he would be attempting a return to the NFL as a defensive end, stating "Just give me one chance thats all!!"

== NFL career statistics ==
=== Regular season ===
General			Rushing					Receiving					Fumbles	
Year	Team	GP	Att	Yds	Avg	Lng	TD	Rec	Yds	Avg	Lng	TD	Fum	Lost
2005	NYG	16	38	99	2.6	21	7	0	0	0.0	0	0	1	1
2006	NYG	15	96	423	4.4	16	9	11	149	13.5	43	0	2	1
2007	NYG	11	202	1,009	5.0	43T	4	23	174	7.6	34	2	5	4
2008	NYG	13	219	1,089	5.0	44	15	6	36	6.0	9	0	3	1
2009	NYG	15	224	835	3.7	31	5	18	184	10.2	74T	1	2	1
2010	NYG	16	147	823	5.6	73	9	7	59	8.4	22	0	2	2
2011	NYG	14	152	571	3.8	28	7	15	128	8.5	40T	1	3	0
2012	SF	2	5	7	1.4	3	0	0	0	0.0	0	0	0	0
2013	NYG	7	58	238	4.1	37	4	2	13	6.5	8	0	1	1
Career		109	1,141	5,094	4.5	73	60	80	730	9.1	74	4	19	11

=== Postseason ===
General			Rushing					Receiving				
Year	Team	GP	Att	Yds	Avg	Lng	TD	Rec	Yds	Avg	Lng	TD
2005	NYG	1	0	0	0.0	0	0	0	0	0.0	0	0
2006	NYG	1	2	8	4.0	5	0	0	0	0.0	0	0
2007	NYG	4	62	197	3.2	12	3	4	29	7.3	11	1
2008	NYG	1	19	92	4.8	24	0	0	0	0.0	0	0
2011	NYG	4	37	164	4.4	34	1	4	16	4.0	5	0
Career		11	120	461	3.8	34	4	8	45	5.6	11	1

== Personal life ==
In June 2011, Jacobs acted in the series finale episode of Law & Order: Criminal Intent. On October 19, 2012, Jacobs appeared, with Pro NRG founder Tania Patruno, to pitch the fledgling company's protein supplement/energy drink and hopefully score the venture some investment capital on episode #406 of ABC's Shark Tank. Jacobs also appeared on an episode of Impact Wrestling which aired on February 16, 2012. Jacobs put wrestler Bully Ray through a table on the episode.

Jacobs resides in Georgia.

His son, Brayden is an offensive lineman for the Clemson Tigers.
