= Gibril Wilson =

Sierra Leone-born American football player (born 1981)

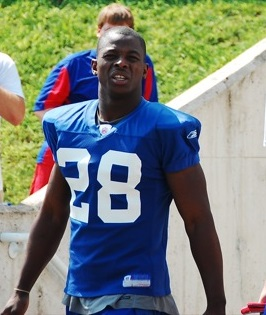
- Wilson with the New York Giants in 2007

No. 28, 27
- Position: Safety

Personal information
- Born: 12 November 1981 (age 44); Freetown, Sierra Leone
- Listed height: 6 ft 0 in (1.83 m)
- Listed weight: 206 lb (93 kg)

Career information
- High school: Oak Grove (San Jose, California, U.S.)
- College: Tennessee
- NFL draft: 2004: 5th round, 136th overall pick

Career history
- New York Giants (2004–2007); Oakland Raiders (2008); Miami Dolphins (2009); Cincinnati Bengals (2010–2011)

Awards and highlights
- Super Bowl champion (XLII); Second-team All-SEC (2003)

Career NFL statistics
- Total tackles: 625
- Sacks: 8.5
- Forced fumbles: 8
- Fumble recoveries: 7
- Interceptions: 13
- Stats at Pro Football Reference

Gibril Donald Wilson (born 12 November 1981) is an American former professional football player who was a safety in the National Football League (NFL). He was selected by the New York Giants in the fifth round of the 2004 NFL draft. He played college football for the Tennessee Volunteers.

Wilson earned a Super Bowl ring with the Giants in Super Bowl XLII. In addition, he also played for the Oakland Raiders, Miami Dolphins and Cincinnati Bengals.

== College career ==
Wilson was born in Freetown, Sierra Leone and moved to the U.S. at age five. Although Wilson excelled in football as both a wide receiver and defensive back at Oak Grove High School, he drew little attention from any Division I schools. He initially attended City College of San Francisco, and two years later was the top recruited junior college safety, choosing Tennessee over USC, Oregon and Florida.

== Professional career ==
=== New York Giants ===
Wilson was selected by the New York Giants in the fifth round of the 2004 NFL draft, with whom he later won Super Bowl XLII over the previously undefeated New England Patriots. In his four years with the team, he started 51 of 52 games, recording 360 tackles, six sacks, and 11 interceptions.

=== Oakland Raiders ===
In 2008, Wilson signed a six-year, $39 million contract with the Oakland Raiders, making him one of the highest paid safeties in NFL history.

Wilson was released by the Raiders after one season with the team on 20 February 2009. He finished the season with 129 tackles, 1.5 sacks, and two interceptions.

=== Miami Dolphins ===
Wilson agreed to a five-year contract with the Miami Dolphins on 26 February 2009. The contract was worth $27.5 million with $8 million guaranteed. Wilson was released on 5 March 2010.

=== Cincinnati Bengals ===
Wilson signed with the Cincinnati Bengals on 6 May 2010. During a preseason game with the Philadelphia Eagles, he injured the ACL and MCL in his left knee. Following surgery he sat out the 2010 season.

== NFL career statistics ==
Legend
**Bold**	Career high

=== Regular season ===
Year	Team	Games		Tackles					Interceptions					Fumbles			
Year	Team	GP	GS	Cmb	Solo	Ast	Sck	TFL	Int	Yds	TD	Lng	PD	FF	FR	Yds	TD
2004	NYG	8	7	56	49	7	**3.0**	**4**	3	**39**	0	**39**	5	1	0	0	0
2005	NYG	**16**	**16**	114	92	22	**3.0**	**4**	2	36	0	19	5	2	0	0	0
2006	NYG	15	15	103	77	26	0.0	2	2	25	0	25	**10**	**3**	2	0	0
2007	NYG	13	13	92	78	14	0.0	**4**	**4**	12	0	10	7	0	1	0	0
2008	OAK	**16**	15	**134**	**98**	**36**	1.5	3	2	5	0	5	3	1	**3**	**9**	0
2009	MIA	**16**	14	93	73	20	1.0	1	0	0	0	0	7	0	0	0	0
2011	CIN	**16**	1	33	21	12	0.0	0	0	0	0	0	0	1	1	0	0
Career		100	81	625	488	137	8.5	18	13	117	0	39	37	8	7	9	0

=== Playoffs ===
Year	Team	Games		Tackles					Interceptions					Fumbles			
Year	Team	GP	GS	Cmb	Solo	Ast	Sck	TFL	Int	Yds	TD	Lng	PD	FF	FR	Yds	TD
2005	NYG	1	1	15	11	4	0.0	**1**	0	0	0	0	1	0	0	0	0
2006	NYG	1	1	4	4	0	0.0	0	0	0	0	0	2	0	0	0	0
2007	NYG	**4**	**4**	**27**	**15**	**12**	0.0	0	0	0	0	0	**3**	0	0	0	0
2011	CIN	1	0	1	1	0	0.0	0	0	0	0	0	0	0	0	0	0
Career		7	6	47	31	16	0.0	1	0	0	0	0	6	0	0	0	0
