= Super Bowl XLII =

2008 National Football League championship game

New York Giants (5) (NFC) (10–6)	New England Patriots (1) (AFC) (16–0)
17	14
Head coach: Tom Coughlin	Head coach: Bill Belichick
	1	2	3	4	Total
NYG	3	0	0	14	17
NE	0	7	0	7	14
- Date: February 3, 2008
- Stadium: University of Phoenix Stadium; Glendale, Arizona
- MVP: Eli Manning, quarterback
- Favorite: Patriots by 12.5
- Referee: Mike Carey
- Attendance: 71,101

Ceremonies
- National anthem: Jordin Sparks
- Coin toss: Ronnie Lott, Jerry Rice, Steve Young, along with Bill Walsh's children, Craig and Elizabeth
- Halftime show: Tom Petty and the Heartbreakers

TV in the United States
- Network: Fox
- Announcers: Joe Buck, Troy Aikman, Pam Oliver, and Chris Myers
- Nielsen ratings: 43.1 (est. 97.5 million viewers)
- Market share: 65 (national); 81 (Boston); 67 (New York)
- Cost of 30-second commercial: $2.7 million

Radio in the United States
- Network: Westwood One
- Announcers: Marv Albert, Boomer Esiason, John Dockery, and Kevin Kiley

Super Bowl XLII was an American football game between the National Football Conference (NFC) champion New York Giants and the American Football Conference (AFC) champion New England Patriots to decide the National Football League (NFL) champion for the 2007 season. The game was played on February 3, 2008, at the University of Phoenix Stadium in Glendale, Arizona. This Super Bowl was a rematch of the final game of the regular season, in which the Patriots won, 38–35. The Giants defeated the heavily favored Patriots by a score of 17–14, widely considered one of the biggest upsets in the history of professional North American sports. Giants quarterback Eli Manning, who completed 19 of 34 passes for 255 yards with two touchdowns and one interception, was named Super Bowl MVP.

The Patriots entered the game as 12-point favorites after becoming the first team to complete a perfect regular season since the 1972 Miami Dolphins, and the only one since the league expanded to a 16-game regular season schedule in 1978. The Giants, who finished the regular season with a 10–6 record, were seeking to become the first NFC wild card team to win a Super Bowl, and were also looking for their seventh NFL championship and first since they won Super Bowl XXV seventeen years earlier.

The game was tight throughout, with both teams' defense dominating the competition until near the end of the game. The game featured five total lead changes (New York took it three times and New England twice) and the fourth quarter saw a Super Bowl-record three lead changes. After David Tyree's 3-yard touchdown reception at the beginning of the quarter, Patriots wide receiver Randy Moss made a 6-yard touchdown reception, making the score 14-10 with 2:42 left in the game. The Giants started their subsequent drive on their own 17-yard line with 2:39 left. On the drive's most memorable play, Tyree made the "Helmet Catch" on 3rd down, a leaping one-handed catch pinning the football with his right hand to the crown of his helmet for a 32-yard first down conversion. After a second first-down conversion by Steve Smith on 3rd and 11, wide receiver Plaxico Burress scored the game-winning touchdown on a 13-yard reception. The Patriots then proceeded to turnover on downs on their final drive as the Giants ran out the clock. The game became one of the lowest scoring Super Bowls since Super Bowl IX 31 years earlier; it would be followed by Super Bowl LIII in 2019, a game that also involved the Patriots. This game was also the first, and as of the 2025 season, only, Super Bowl with three fourth-quarter lead changes.

Super Bowl XLII is often considered the greatest Super Bowl of all time in retrospect by several media outlets. The Giants' victory is remembered as one of the greatest "Cinderella" stories in professional sports history, and their game-winning drive is regarded as one of the greatest of all time. Several outlets and sports publishers have also considered the game to be a moment that defined sports in the 2000s. Super Bowl XLII was ranked fifth on the NFL's 100 Greatest Games list, the highest ranked Super Bowl game, while Tyree's catch was ranked third on the NFL's 100 Greatest Plays. The game's broadcast on Fox broke the then-record for the most watched Super Bowl in history with an average of 97.5 million viewers in the United States.

The Giants and Patriots would once again meet in Super Bowl XLVI four years later, where the Giants would win again 21–17.

== Background ==
=== Host selection process ===
NFL owners voted to award Super Bowl XLII to Glendale, Arizona during their October 30, 2003 meeting held in Chicago. Four cities were initially part of the bid process: Glendale (University of Phoenix Stadium), Tampa (Raymond James Stadium), New York/New Jersey (Giants Stadium), and Washington (FedEx Field). It was the second Super Bowl in the Phoenix area, after XXX at Sun Devil Stadium in nearby Tempe, and the first of multiple Super Bowls at University of Phoenix Stadium.

In early 2002, during his annual "State of the League" press conference, NFL commissioner Paul Tagliabue publicly floated the idea of awarding a Super Bowl to New York City, contingent on a renovation of Giants Stadium. If selected, it would be the first outdoor Super Bowl in a cold-weather locale. Hosting the game at the Meadowlands in East Rutherford, New Jersey was conceived in-part as an effort to boost economic recovery in the wake of 9/11. As such, Washington, D.C. was also invited to submit a bid. Tagliabue stated at the time that hosting the Super Bowl only in warm-weather cities (or in domed stadiums) was considered "passé in our league" and directed the Super Bowl Advisory Committee to study the feasibility of hosting it outdoors in a northern city.

Both the New York/New Jersey and the Washington, D.C. contingents made special presentations during the NFL's fall owners meeting in New York on October 30–31, 2002. The NY/NJ group included representatives from both the Giants and the Jets, and had support from Senators Chuck Schumer and Robert Torricelli. The Jets at the time happened to be in the early planning stages of West Side Stadium, though the league noted that the proposed stadium's status would not be a factor in the decision. Instead, substantial renovations to Giants Stadium would be the driving issue. The D.C. group included representatives from the Redskins. The effort was tentatively aimed towards XLI. Following the meeting, however, the bids for both NY/NJ and Washington were tabled, and instead reassigned and refocused towards XLII.

New York/New Jersey was the "sentimental favorite" to host XLII going into the bidding process. However their prospects diminished when renovation plans to aging Giants Stadium hit a stalemate. By the summer of 2003, the Jets had exited the project, electing to focus on a separate bid for West Side Stadium for a future Super Bowl. The Giants and the New Jersey Sports and Exposition Authority sparred over the funding of $250–300 million for stadium upgrades. By September 2003, the Giants made a tentative agreement to cover nearly all of the costs of the renovations. By this time, however, the NY/NJ bid had largely fallen out of favor, and was facing several logistical complications. Arizona, with a new state-of-the-art stadium already under construction, emerged as the clear front-runner. On October 16, the NY/NJ hosting committee officially withdrew their bid. Washington recruited former senator Fred Thompson, and by some accounts, had a "superior" presentation. Redskins owner Daniel Snyder touted FedEx Field's larger seating capacity, but the prospects were still slim due to the uncertainties of the cold weather. Tampa, despite warm weather and a relatively new stadium, also faced some long odds. Tampa hosted XXXV, five years more recent than Arizona's previous hosting duties (XXX), and the state of Florida was already scheduled to host XLI in Miami.

With just three cities remaining (Glendale, Tampa, and Washington), the vote amongst the 32 owners was scheduled for multiple rounds. A bid receiving 3/4 of the ballots would automatically win. If no city had won after three rounds, the vote would revert to a simply majority. Just days before the scheduled vote, the Phoenix area received positive compliments of their handling of a last-minute scheduling change; the game between the San Diego Chargers and Miami Dolphins was moved to Sun Devil Stadium due to the Cedar Fire. The Arizona hosting committee won the hosting duties on the first vote. In subsequent years, Tampa was chosen as the site for XLIII and NY/NJ would ultimately host XLVIII at new MetLife Stadium.

=== Venue ===
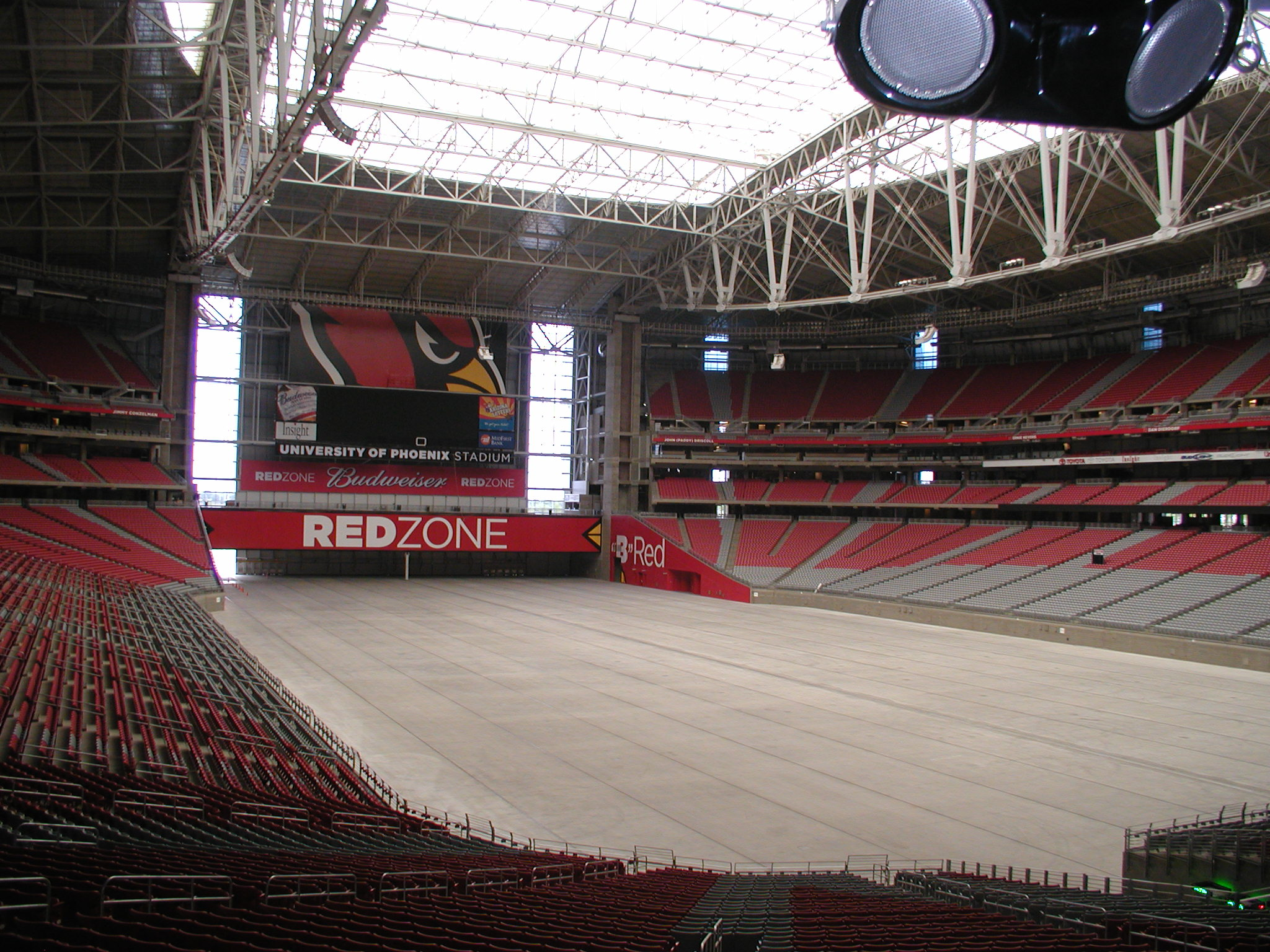
University of Phoenix Stadium

The kickoff for the game took place at 4:32 p.m. MST (23:32 UTC). This was the first Super Bowl played on a retractable natural-grass field surface. At the time, the University of Phoenix Stadium's roll-in grass field was unique among American sports venues. Another similar roll-in field has since been installed at Allegiant Stadium (LVIII).

XLII was also the second Super Bowl played in a retractable-roof stadium (the first was XXXVIII at Reliant Stadium in Houston). During the regular season, the home team decides 90 minutes prior to kickoff whether the roof will be open or closed; an open roof must remain open unless weather conditions deteriorate. However, as a neutral site, the NFL controls the option to open or close without any restrictions. During XXXVIII, the roof was open for pregame and halftime shows but closed during the game itself. Because there was rain in the forecast for XLII, the decision was made to keep the roof closed for the entire day's activities.

During a February 6, 2007, ceremony with Arizona Governor Janet Napolitano, the NFL and the Arizona Super Bowl Host Committee unveiled the slogan "Who Wants It More?" along with its mascot "Spike the Super Ball" (an anthropomorphized football with sunglasses and sneakers) and a large "Super Bowl XLII Countdown Clock" at Phoenix Sky Harbor International Airport. The Super Bowl XLII logo was also unveiled. It features the shape of the state of Arizona in red and two horizontal white stripes in the middle to represent the vertical lines on University of Phoenix Stadium. The turquoise Roman numerals represent the Native American culture of Arizona. The red star represents the AFC and the blue star represents the NFC. This was also the last Super Bowl with the league's previous logo painted at midfield; the following season, the league redesigned its primary logo.

=== Teams ===
==== New York Giants ====
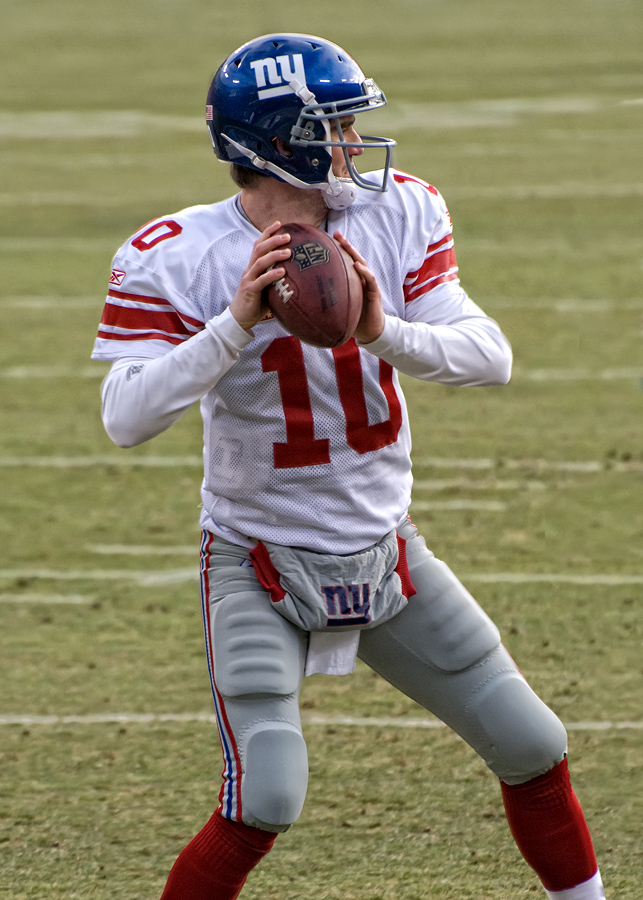
QB Eli Manning was named Super Bowl MVP

The Giants began the season with low expectations after star running back Tiki Barber retired. The Giants had lost in the NFC Wild Card round in each of the previous two seasons and had not won a playoff game in seven years. Quarterback Eli Manning, the younger brother of Super Bowl XLI MVP quarterback Peyton Manning, had struggled to find consistency. In his three seasons as a starter, he had completed less than 54% of his passes with a career passer rating of 73.4. While generally regarded as a solid quarterback, Manning had been unable to achieve the same level of success as fellow 2004 draftees Philip Rivers (for whom he was traded) and Ben Roethlisberger, the latter of whom had already won a Super Bowl (Super Bowl XL). By the 2007 season, many sports writers were starting to question if Eli would ever live up to the expectations that accompanied being selected with the first overall pick in a draft.

The criticism of Manning intensified as the Giants lost the first two games of the regular season. The Giants recovered, though, notching six consecutive wins and finishing the year with a 10–6 record. The Giants were able to secure a wild card bid in the playoffs, despite the loss of running back Derrick Ward, defensive end Mathias Kiwanuka, and four-time Pro Bowl tight end Jeremy Shockey to injury. In the final game of the regular season, the Giants played at home against the undefeated New England Patriots. Although the Giants had already earned a playoff spot and had nothing to gain by winning the game, Giants head coach Tom Coughlin decided to play his starters throughout the game. The Giants, clearly playing to win against the league's best team, narrowly lost 38–35. But the effort seemed to rejuvenate the Giants and prepare them for a difficult playoff run. Manning led his team to three road playoff wins against the Tampa Bay Buccaneers, Dallas Cowboys and Green Bay Packers respectively, without throwing a single interception. The Giants' three playoff wins gave them an NFL record 10 consecutive wins on the road. They finished the season with a franchise-low 77 penalties, after setting a franchise record two years before with 146.

Manning finished the 2007 season with 3,336 yards, 23 touchdowns, and 20 interceptions. His primary target, Plaxico Burress, caught 70 passes for 1,050 yards and 12 touchdowns. Amani Toomer, the Giants all-time leading receiver and one of only two players remaining from their last Super Bowl appearance in Super Bowl XXXV, was also a reliable target with 59 receptions for 760 yards, while Shockey contributed 57 receptions for 619 yards and 3 touchdowns before suffering a season-ending injury in week 15. The Giants' ground game was led by running back Brandon Jacobs, who at 6 ft 4 in (193 cm) and 264 pounds (120 kg), was one of the largest starting halfbacks in the NFL. He finished the season with 1,009 yards and an average of five yards per carry, while also catching 23 passes despite starting only nine games. Running back Reuben Droughns rushed for 276 yards and team-leading 6 touchdowns, while also catching 7 passes for 49 yards and returning 21 kickoffs for 437 yards. Rookie running back Ahmad Bradshaw added 38 kickoff returns for 921 yards, while also rushing for 190.

The Giants had a defensive line that was led by defensive ends Osi Umenyiora (the lone Pro Bowl representative on the team, the fewest a Super Bowl team has ever had), Michael Strahan, and Justin Tuck. Umenyiora led the defense with 13 sacks and five forced fumbles. Strahan, another veteran from the Giants' last Super Bowl appearance in 2000, had nine sacks, giving him a career total of 141.5 and breaking the franchise record held by Lawrence Taylor. Tuck recorded ten sacks and 48 solo tackles. In the secondary, cornerback Sam Madison and safety Gibril Wilson led the team with four interceptions each. Cornerback R. W. McQuarters had no interceptions during the season, but played effectively in the playoffs, with interceptions in each of the Giants' first three postseason games. Punter Jeff Feagles played in his first Super Bowl after 20 years in the NFL. This was also the last game for Giants athletic trainer John Johnson, who had been with the team for 60 years.

The Giants became only the fourth team to win the Super Bowl without playing a single home game in the preceding playoffs. They joined the 1966 Green Bay Packers (who won Super Bowl I against the Kansas City Chiefs), the 1969 Kansas City Chiefs (who won Super Bowl IV against the Minnesota Vikings) and the 2005 Pittsburgh Steelers (who won Super Bowl XL against the Seattle Seahawks) in accomplishing this feat. However, the Packers had to win two games (including the Super Bowl), the Chiefs three, and the Steelers and the Giants four, in order to accomplish this. Since then, two other teams also won three road playoff games to reach the Super Bowl: the 2010 Green Bay Packers, who won Super Bowl XLV over the Pittsburgh Steelers, and the 2020 Tampa Bay Buccaneers, winners of Super Bowl LV (played in their home stadium with limited attendance because of COVID-19) over the Kansas City Chiefs.

The Giants were the only NFC team to make multiple Super Bowl appearances in the 2000s decade, at the ends of the 2000 and 2007 seasons. Starting with the Rams' appearance in 2001, ten different NFC teams represented the conference from 2001 to 2010: St. Louis Rams, Tampa Bay Buccaneers, Carolina Panthers, Philadelphia Eagles, Seattle Seahawks, Chicago Bears, New York Giants, Arizona Cardinals, New Orleans Saints, and Green Bay Packers.

==== New England Patriots ====
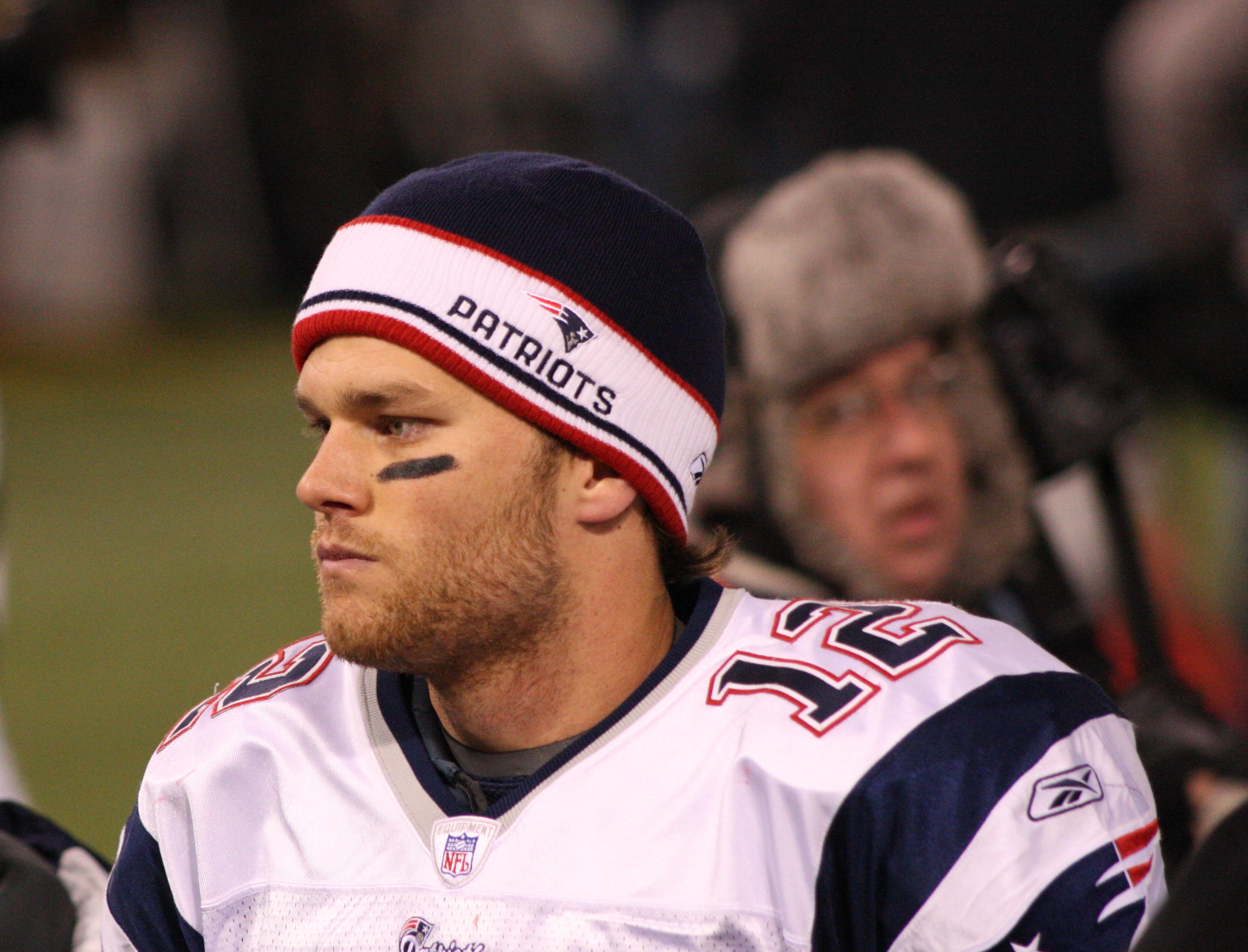
QB Tom Brady threw a then NFL record 50 touchdowns during the regular season

When the Patriots arrived at Super Bowl XLII, they were already billed as the greatest team in NFL history. In fact, the Patriots were the #1 team for every week of 2007, starting with the preseason all the way to the Super Bowl. The Patriots were not only competing for a fourth Super Bowl title since the 2001 season; they were aiming to become the first team in NFL history to achieve a 19–0 record. Their perfect 16–0 record in the regular season was the first since the league moved to a 16-game regular season in 1978. It was also only the fourth undefeated and untied regular season in NFL history. New England set NFL records with 589 points scored (an average of 36.8 points per game) (since broken by the 2013 Denver Broncos), 75 total touchdowns, and a net differential of +315 points (they gave up 274 points, fourth best in the league). Some experts have suggested that the Patriots' 16–0 record is the culmination of a larger trend towards better records for top NFL teams since the league realignment in 2002.

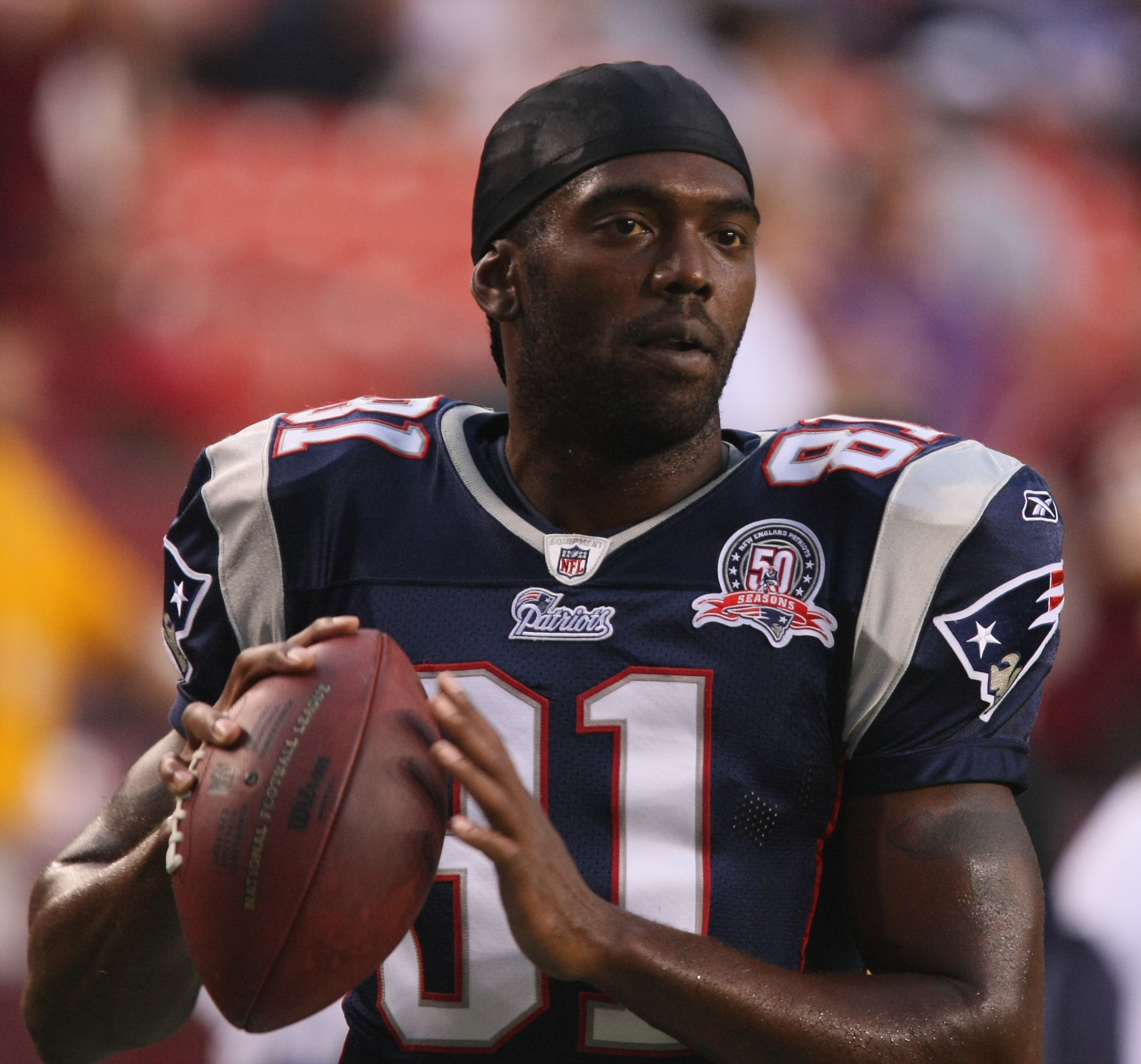
WR Randy Moss caught a league-record 23 touchdowns in 2007–08

The team was led by then eighth-year quarterback Tom Brady who proceeded to have the best season of his entire career and won his first NFL MVP and NFL Offensive MVP awards, throwing for a then-career-high 4,806 yards and a then NFL record 50 touchdowns (22 more than his previous best season; since broken by Peyton Manning in 2013), and just eight interceptions. His passer rating of 117.2 was the second-highest season rating in NFL history. One often-cited reason for Brady's improved numbers was the acquisition of receivers Randy Moss and Wes Welker. The Patriots acquired Moss, a nine-year veteran, from the Oakland Raiders for a fourth-round pick in the 2007 NFL draft after Moss had, statistically, the worst year of his career (with 42 receptions for 553 yards and three touchdowns). With the Patriots, though, Moss caught 98 receptions for 1,493 yards and an NFL record 23 touchdowns, and was selected a first-team All Pro. The Patriots also gave the Miami Dolphins second- and seventh-round picks for Welker. Welker tied for the league lead with 112 receptions for 1,175 yards and 8 touchdowns, while also returning 25 punts for 249 yards and 7 kickoffs for 176, earning himself second-team All Pro selection. Welker and Moss both earned votes for Offensive Player of the Year. Other major contributors to the Patriots' passing game included Donté Stallworth, who added 697 yards and three touchdowns, and tight end Benjamin Watson, whose 36 receptions totaled 389 yards and six touchdowns.

Running back Laurence Maroney was the Patriots' top rusher with 835 yards and six touchdowns, while Sammy Morris added 385 yards and three touchdowns (Morris ended up on injured reserve midway through the season, and thus could not play in the Super Bowl). Longtime Patriot Kevin Faulk had 265 yards and was also a reliable receiver out of the backfield, catching 47 passes for 383 yards and a touchdown. The Patriots' offensive line featured three players selected to the Pro Bowl, guard Logan Mankins, tackle Matt Light, and center Dan Koppen.

The Patriots' defensive line was led by nose tackle Vince Wilfork, who was selected to his first Pro Bowl; he was also fined four times during the season for unnecessary roughness. The Patriots had a set of veteran linebackers who had a combined 16 Pro Bowl selections. Outside linebacker Mike Vrabel had, statistically, the best season of his career. He led the team in sacks with a career-high 12.5, while also forcing five fumbles and earning his first Pro Bowl selection. Adalius Thomas, an off-season signing from the Baltimore Ravens, recorded six sacks. Junior Seau, who had been selected to the Pro Bowl 12 times during his career but had never won a Super Bowl, returned for his 18th season and got 74 tackles with 3.5 sacks. Tedy Bruschi recorded 92 tackles and two sacks. The Patriots' secondary featured another player selected to the Pro Bowl, cornerback Asante Samuel, who led the team with six interceptions. Defensive back Ellis Hobbs returned 35 kickoffs for 911 yards and a touchdown, ranking him 7th in the NFL with a 26.0 yards per return average.

=== Playoffs ===
The Giants became the first NFC team (third overall) to advance to the Super Bowl by winning three playoff games on the road. After beating the fourth-seeded Tampa Bay Buccaneers 24–14, the Giants upset the top-seeded Dallas Cowboys 21–17, when R. W. McQuarters intercepted a pass from Cowboys quarterback Tony Romo in the end zone as time expired. The Giants advanced to the Super Bowl with a 23–20 overtime win over the second-seeded Green Bay Packers in the NFC Championship Game, which was the third coldest game in NFL history (−1 °F at kickoff, −24 °F wind chill) with an interception by Corey Webster that set up Lawrence Tynes's game-winning 47-yard field goal. The field goal was the longest by a visiting kicker in Lambeau Field postseason history. This turned out to be the final game Brett Favre played for the Packers.

Meanwhile, the Patriots continued to set NFL records on their road to the Super Bowl. First, Brady set the NFL record for completion percentage in a single game (92.9%) with 26 of 28 completions for 268 yards and three touchdowns in their 31–20 win over the Jacksonville Jaguars in the divisional round, while safety Rodney Harrison tied an NFL record by recording an interception in his fourth consecutive postseason game. One week later, the Patriots defeated the San Diego Chargers 21–12 in the AFC Championship Game. Although Brady threw three interceptions in the game, the Patriots defense forced two turnovers and limited the Chargers to four field goals, while Maroney rushed for 122 yards and a touchdown for the second game in a row.

=== Pre-game notes ===
This was the sixth meeting between teams from Boston and New York City for a major professional sports championship. This previously occurred in two Stanley Cup Finals (1929, 1972) and three World Series (1912, 1916, 1986).

The Patriots were heavily favored to win the game and become the first NFL team to go through a 16-game regular season and postseason undefeated. Had the Patriots won, they would also have joined the 1972 Miami Dolphins as the only teams ever to win the NFL league championship with an undefeated and untied record. However, others predicted that the Giants could accomplish a win. The Giants' record of 10 consecutive road wins included five teams favored to beat them. The Giants achieved playoff victories against the Dallas Cowboys (who had defeated the Giants twice in the regular season) and the Green Bay Packers (who had beaten the Giants in week 2).

The Patriots and Giants had played against each other in the last week of the regular season. Technically, the game had little significance, since both teams had already clinched their respective spots in the playoffs. But due to the Patriots' quest for an undefeated season, this game was one of the most heavily watched games in league history. NFL Network was originally scheduled to air the game as part of their Saturday Night Football coverage, with WCVB and WWOR carrying the game locally in Boston and New York. Shortly before the game was scheduled to air, CBS and NBC bought broadcast rights to the game and NFL Network's broadcast was carried by both networks, marking the first time in NFL history that an NFL game was carried on three broadcast networks at the same time. The game was also the first NFL game to be simulcast on a national level since Super Bowl I. As they were favored to do, the Patriots won the game to finish the regular season undefeated. Still, the game was close and competitive, with both teams playing their starters for all 60 minutes. The Patriots won, 38–35, by overcoming a 12-point deficit in the third quarter, the largest deficit the Patriots had faced all season. "There is nothing but positives", Giants head coach Tom Coughlin said after the game. "I told the players in playing this game everything would be positives, there would be no negatives and that is how I feel. I don't know any better way to be prepared for the playoffs than to go against a team that was 15–0."

This would be the third time in the Giants' four Super Bowl appearances in which the team played its eventual AFC opponent during that year's regular season. Both of the prior occasions saw the Giants beat those opponents in the Super Bowl (defeating the Denver Broncos in Super Bowl XXI and the Buffalo Bills in Super Bowl XXV).

For the third consecutive year, the arrival dates for the teams were staggered, with the Patriots arriving on Sunday, January 27 (corresponding to the traditional day that teams arrive for the game with the two-week break) and the Giants waiting to arrive until Monday, January 28. A report filed by ESPN's Rachel Nichols suggested that the Giants stayed to practice more of their game plan in their home facility before arriving at the Super Bowl. By electing to stay back at home the Giants chose to follow a tactic that the previous two Super Bowl champions, the Indianapolis Colts (before Super Bowl XLI) and the Pittsburgh Steelers (before Super Bowl XL), had employed.

The Patriots practiced at Sun Devil Stadium on the campus of Arizona State University, while the Giants practiced at the Arizona Cardinals' practice facility, both of which are located in Tempe.

As the designated home team in the annual rotation between AFC and NFC teams, the Patriots elected to wear their home navy uniforms with silver pants, while the Giants wore their road white uniforms with grey pants.

== Broadcasting ==
=== Television ===
==== United States ====
Fox broadcast Super Bowl XLII as part of an annual cycle between the three main broadcast television partners of the NFL. Joe Buck and Troy Aikman called the game, while Pam Oliver and Chris Myers were the sideline reporters. Fox aired nine hours of pre-game programming, which began with a special episode of Fox News Sunday, as well as a two-hour special (Fox Super Sunday) hosted by Fox News Channel anchor Shepard Smith, which previewed the Super Tuesday primaries for the 2008 presidential election. The Fox NFL Sunday panel hosted the main pre-game show, led by Curt Menefee, joined by Terry Bradshaw, Howie Long, and Jimmy Johnson. Jillian Reynolds served as Weather and entertainment reporter, Frank Caliendo appeared in various comedic skits (including one where he portrayed John Madden and correctly predicted that the Giants would win) and American Idol host Ryan Seacrest provided coverage of celebrity arrivals to the game site. A Spanish language broadcast was aired on the second audio program with John Laguna as play-by-play announcer and Pepe Mantilla as color analyst.

===== Ratings =====
The telecast was the most watched Super Bowl in history with an average of 97.5 million viewers in the United States. These numbers were later surpassed by several subsequent games, including 2015's Super Bowl XLIX (which was also hosted by Glendale), which now holds the record with an average of 114 million viewers. The Super Bowl XLII broadcast achieved the highest Nielsen ratings (43.3) for the game since Super Bowl XXXIV. At the time, it was also the second most watched TV program of all time in the United States.

===== Commercials =====
Fox took in at least $250 million in revenue from commercial time sold for the game. One of 63 thirty-second spots among thirty-seven different advertisers cost an estimated $2.7 million (excluding production costs), up from $2.6 million in 2007. However, advertisers are usually offered discounted rates below the official one.

As Super Bowl XLII fell only two days before Super Tuesday, critics and politicians foresaw the possibility that presidential candidates could attempt to buy time during the Super Bowl. However, Fox stated that it would not accept such ads, citing both equal time regulations (the FCC has additionally ruled that, despite requirements for all broadcasters to provide "reasonable" access to commercial inventory for candidates before an election or primary, candidates cannot reasonably expect to receive ad time during high-profile programs of this nature), and the fact that all of the spots had already been sold out by January 2008. However, the campaign of Democratic candidate Barack Obama did purchase local ad time in some markets.

The rock band Eels announced an intent to broadcast a one-second spot during the game (consisting solely of lead singer Mark Oliver Everett saying the letter "U") to promote its compilation album "Useless Trinkets", but later announced that it had backtracked after having learned it could only purchase commercial time in 30-second blocks (and a proposal to recruit 29 other advertisers to air their own one-second ads alongside them could be harmful to viewers with photosensitive epilepsy).

==== International ====
Outside North America, Super Bowl XLII was distributed by the NFL and NFL International. Overall, the game was available to an estimated potential audience of one billion viewers within 223 countries and territories. However, viewing figures outside North America rose only marginally on previous years with an estimated 10 million people tuning in from outside the United States, Canada and Mexico for an overall global audience in the region of 114 million. Dick Stockton and Sterling Sharpe were the announcers for the International broadcast.

===== United Kingdom =====
The BBC acquired the rights in the United Kingdom. The game aired live on BBC Two, carrying the NFL International feed, ending ITV Sport's coverage, which began in 2005. The game was also subsequently available on the BBC's on demand service, iPlayer. Sky Sports broadcast the game in both standard and high definition using Fox's feed and announcers.

=== Streaming ===
Independent Phoenix television station KTVK broadcast a live video stream from a Webcam located outside of the University of Phoenix Stadium. The camera provided millions of Internet users from around the world a chance to peer in on pre- and post-game activities, watching thousands of spectators file into and out of the stadium on Sunday, February 3. The Stadium Cam broadcast from Friday, February 1 to Monday, February 4, 2008, on the station's website.

NFL.com carried its own coverage of Super Bowl events leading up to and after the game, mostly simulcasting NFL Network.

=== Radio ===
On radio, Westwood One had the national broadcast rights to the game in the United States and Canada; Marv Albert and Boomer Esiason served as the announcing team for that network. The game was carried on BBC Radio 5 Live in the United Kingdom with Arlo White commentating.

Sirius Satellite Radio carried twelve feeds in eight languages in the United States. The following language feeds were offered:

- Westwood One (American English)
- Univision Radio/United Stations (Mexican Spanish, U.S.)
- New England Patriots Radio Network
- New York Giants Radio Network
- BBC Radio 5 Live (British English)
- NHK Japan (Japanese)
- NTV Plus (Russian)
- SMG (Mandarin Chinese)

FieldPass, the subscription Internet radio service provided by the league at NFL.com, carried most of these feeds, with select international feeds for free.

Locally, Gil Santos and Gino Cappelletti called the game for the Patriots on WBCN radio, and Bob Papa, Dick Lynch, and Carl Banks called the Giants' radio broadcast on WFAN-AM. By NFL rules, only WBCN, WFAN, Sirius and FieldPass carried the teams' local broadcasts, and affiliate stations instead carried the Westwood One feed. WBCN, WFAN, and Westwood One are all owned by CBS Radio.

=== DVD ===
The official DVD of the Super Bowl was released on February 26, 2008. The DVD covered the entire 2007 New York Giants season, as well as special features including the NFL Network post game commentary, the halftime show in its entirety, the Media Day highlights, the NFC Divisional Game and NFC Championship Game highlights, profiles on Mathias Kiwanuka and Tom Coughlin, and features on Eli Manning and Michael Strahan. The New York Giants: Road to Super Bowl XLII was released on June 3, 2008. It was a 5 disc set that featured the full broadcasts of the last game of the regular season and all four playoff games. On August 26, 2009 New York Giants 10 Greatest Games was released, in which Super Bowl XLII was included as well.

== Entertainment ==
=== Pre-game ceremonies ===
Willie Nelson performed at an NFL-sponsored pre-game tailgate party, singing a duet with Sara Evans of his song "Mammas Don't Let Your Babies Grow Up to Be Cowboys" as part of Fox's pre-game show.

This year's Super Bowl entertainment had many connections to Fox's series American Idol. On August 16, both the NFL and Fox confirmed that Idol host Seacrest would serve as emcee for the pre-game show, with Alicia Keys as the primary performer; as she sang a medley of her songs, including "Go Ahead", "Fallin'", "If I Ain't Got You", "Teenage Love Affair", and "No One" as the final performance. Idol Season Six winner Jordin Sparks, herself a native of Glendale and daughter of former New York Giants cornerback Phillippi Sparks, performed the National Anthem making her the youngest singer to do so at the age of 18, while Phoenix College professor and theatrical interpreter A Dreamer interpreted it into American Sign Language. The anthem was followed by a flyover from the U.S. Navy demonstration squadron, the Blue Angels in their F/A-18A Hornets. In addition, judge Paula Abdul premiered her first music video in over a decade, "Dance Like There's No Tomorrow", which she made with fellow judge Randy Jackson as part of Fox's pregame coverage to kick off her official comeback.

The coin toss ceremony posthumously honored Pro Football Hall of Fame head coach Bill Walsh, who died on July 30, 2007. His former players Ronnie Lott, Jerry Rice and Steve Young joined Walsh's children, Craig and Elizabeth, at the ceremony.

=== Halftime ===
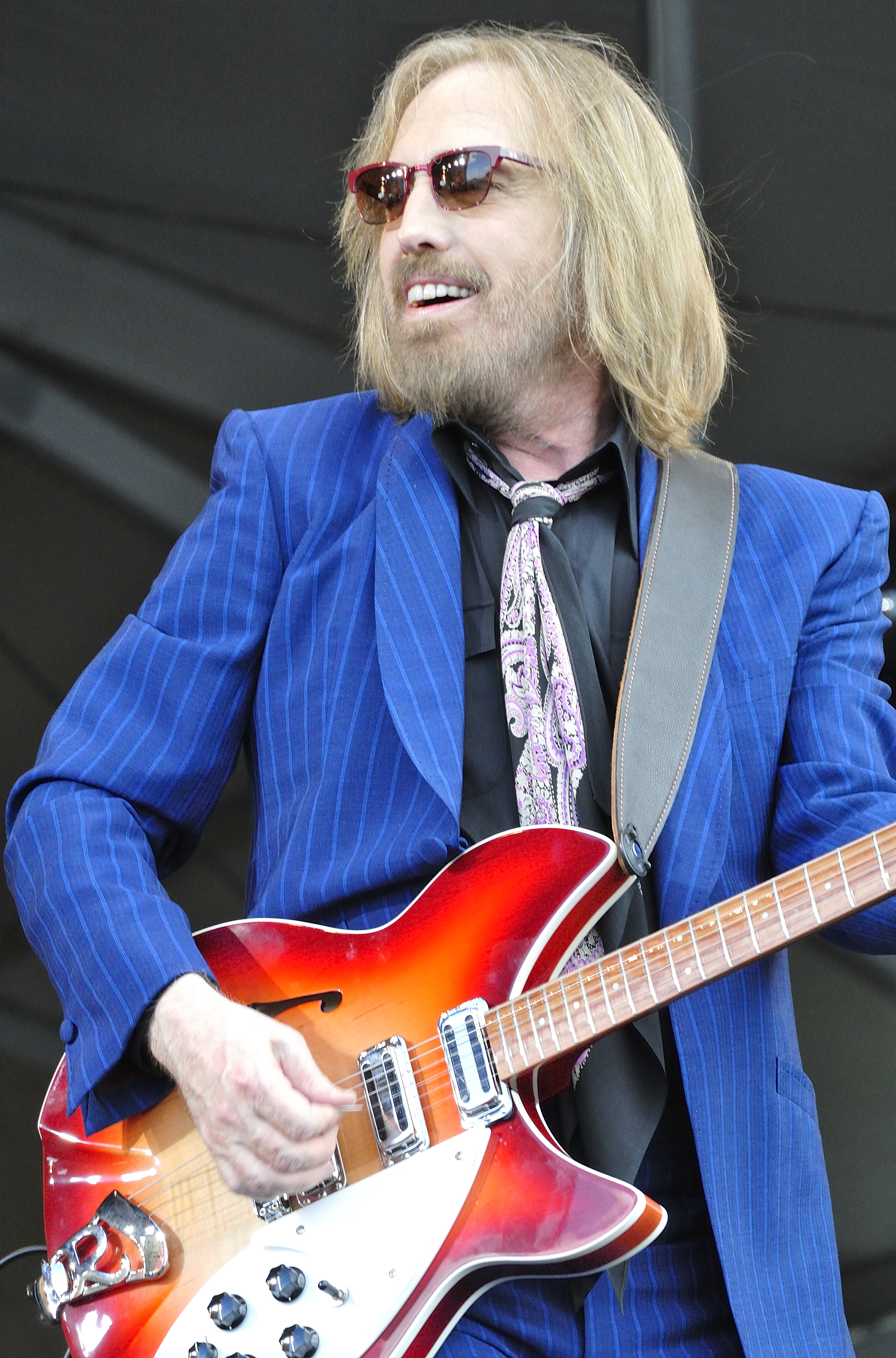
Tom Petty and the Heartbreakers (Tom Petty pictured) played during the halftime show

As is always the case, several big names were mentioned as possible performers for the halftime show before a final choice (Tom Petty and the Heartbreakers) was announced. The halftime entertainer selection process in late 2007 was not unusual: however, since the site selection process four years earlier was of special interest, it is necessary to also mention some of the acts who might have performed, but did not do so.

According to the entertainment publication Variety, a wish list of potential halftime performers was developed by the NFL. Among those on the wish list were Bruce Springsteen (who performed during halftime at Super Bowl XLIII the following year), Norah Jones and the Eagles. In addition, interest in the slot was expressed by Bon Jovi, who had planned to open the U.S. leg of their Lost Highway Tour with a performance during the halftime show.

According to Rolling Stone, the engagement was actually offered to the Eagles by the NFL, but the offer was turned down.

Then, on December 2, 2007, it was officially announced that the halftime entertainment would be provided by Tom Petty and the Heartbreakers. The band performed the songs "American Girl", "I Won't Back Down", "Free Fallin'", and "Runnin' Down a Dream" to kick off their 2008 world tour. Bridgestone served as the halftime show sponsor. The halftime show itself, produced by Don Mischer and White Cherry Entertainment in association with NFL Network, was nominated for an Emmy Award in 2009.

=== Post-game ceremonies ===
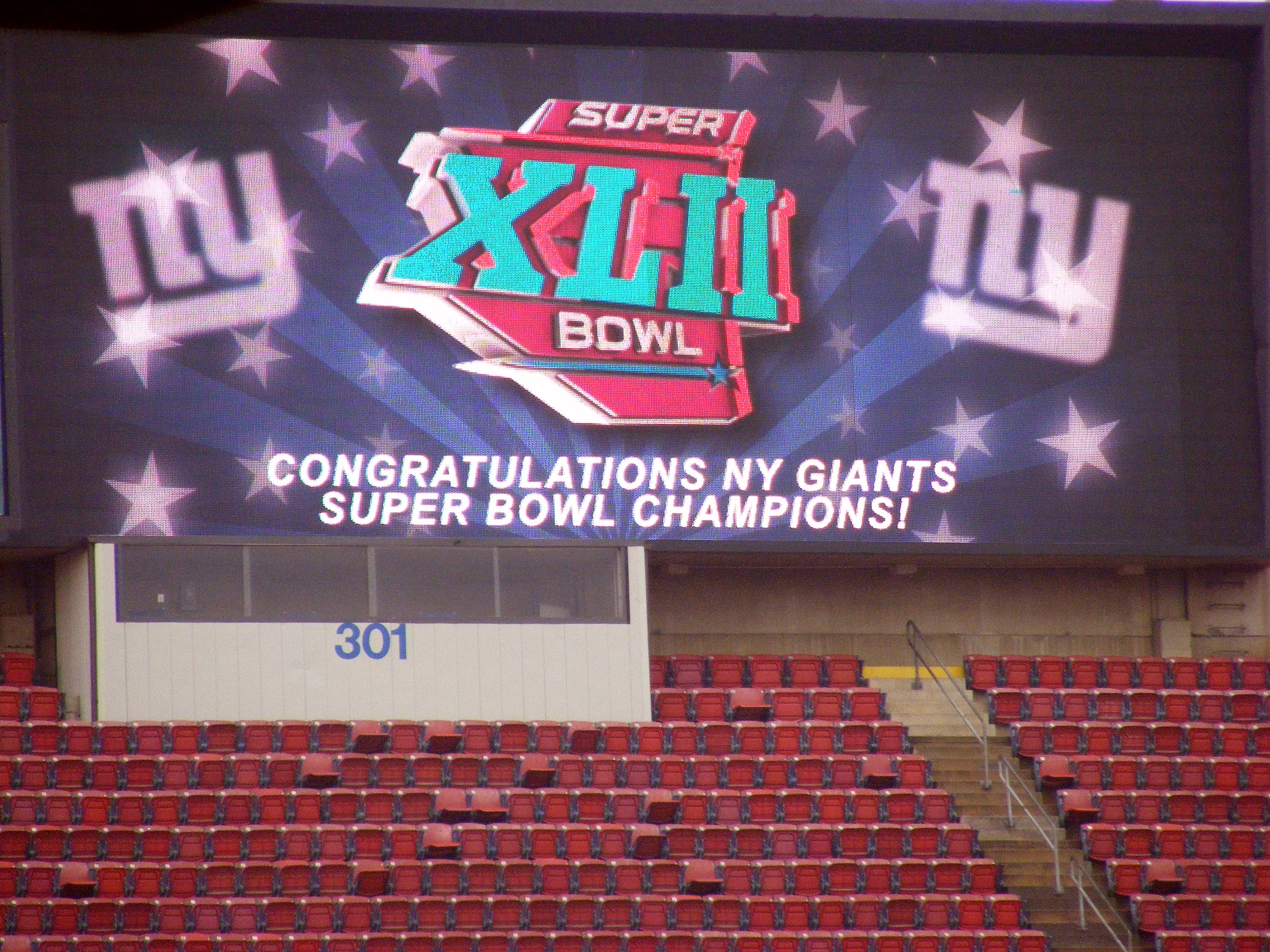
The big screen at Giants Stadium during the Super Bowl XLII victory rally at the New Jersey Meadowlands

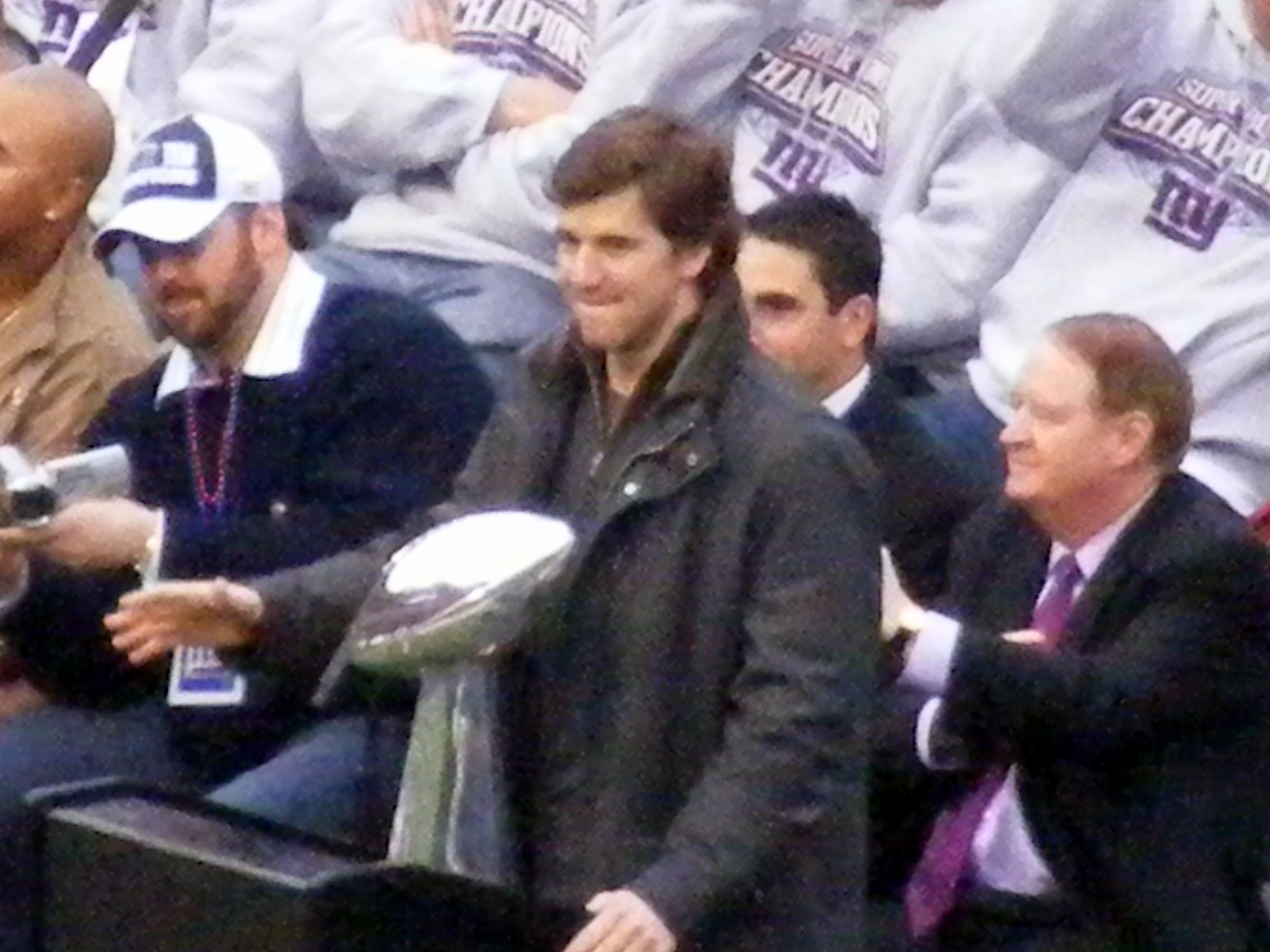
Manning at the Giants' victory rally at New York City Hall

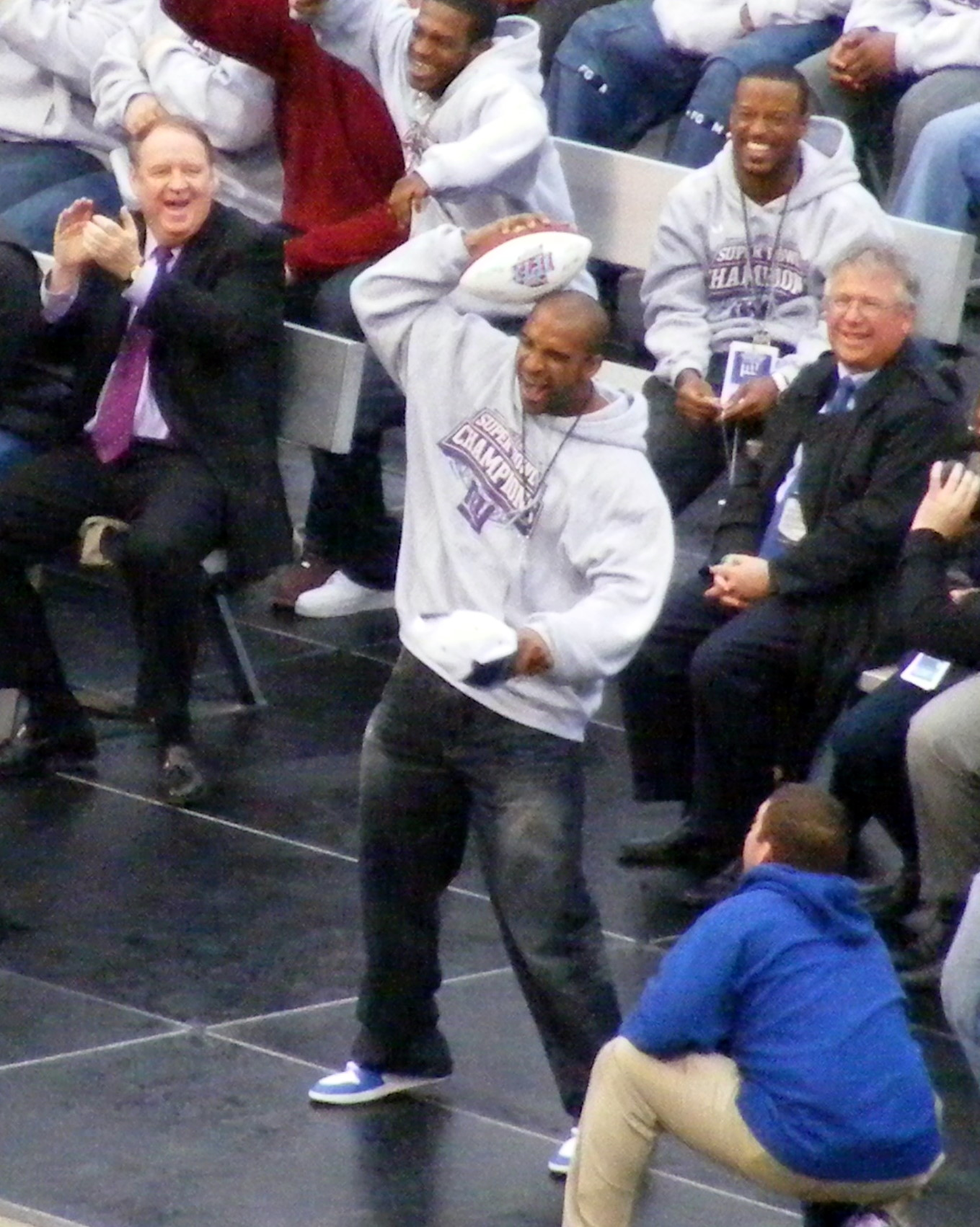
Tyree re-enacting his now-famous catch during the victory rally at Giants Stadium several days after Super Bowl XLII

Former Redskins quarterback Doug Williams, MVP in Super Bowl XXII, commemorating the twentieth anniversary of becoming the first African American quarterback to lead a team to victory in the Super Bowl, took part in the Vince Lombardi Trophy presentation ceremony after the game.

Eli Manning was awarded the Pete Rozelle Trophy for being named MVP, and also received the keys to a 2009 Cadillac Escalade hybrid SUV. Though not the only brothers to play in a Super Bowl, Eli Manning and Peyton Manning (Super Bowl XLI) are the first brothers to be named Super Bowl MVPs (doing so in successive years).

After the game, New York City erupted in celebration, with the sounds of cheers and honking horns echoing through city streets. Crowds of elated New Yorkers, surprised by their team's unexpected victory, packed Second Avenue in Manhattan, stalling traffic around the borough. Times Square was swarmed with celebrating Giants fans well past midnight; similar celebrations arose throughout Brooklyn, Queens, The Bronx, Staten Island, Long Island, Westchester County, Fairfield County, and North Jersey, where the Giants play their home games.

New York Mayor Michael Bloomberg, witnessing the first New York sports team championship victory as mayor, praised the hometown team's upset victory, saying; "New York has come back many times in the past, and Big Blue proved tonight that you should never, ever, count us out." Many New Yorkers polled the Giants' win to be among the most satisfying championship victories in New York sports history. There were also a series of firsts with the championship, not just for the Giants, but also for the city of New York and the New York metropolitan area. Those firsts were:

- Giants:
  - Super Bowl championship since Super Bowl XXV in 1991.
- City of New York:
  - Super Bowl championship since the Giants won Super Bowl XXV in 1991.
  - Major professional sports championship since:
    - The Yankees won the 2000 World Series.
    - This was also the first championship for a team other than the Yankees since the Rangers won the 1994 Stanley Cup.
- New York Metropolitan area:
  - Super Bowl championship since the Giants win in 1991.

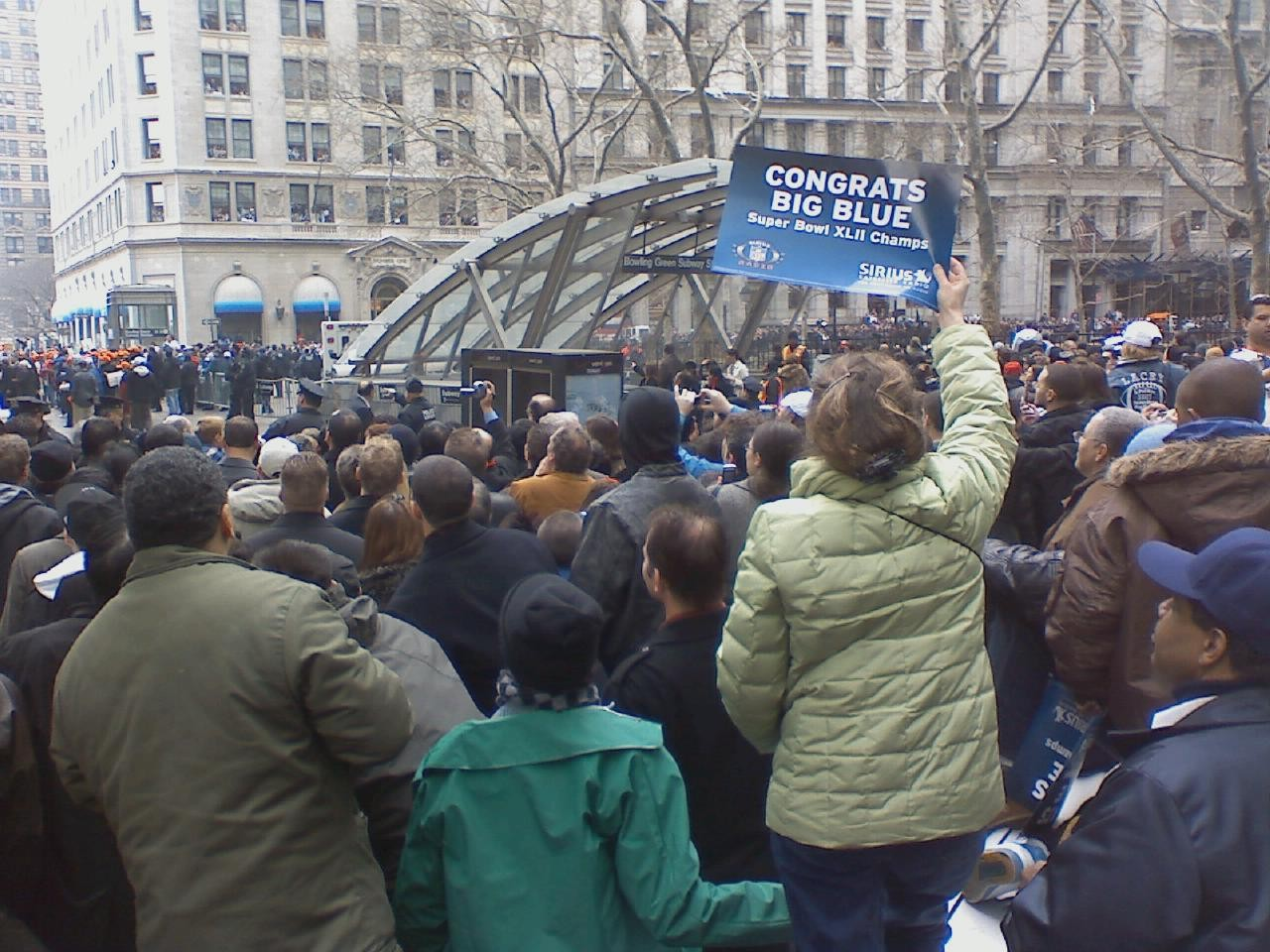
Crowds overrun Bowling Green Station to witness the ticker-tape parade

On the following Tuesday, February 5, New York City hosted for the Giants a ticker tape parade up Broadway in Lower Manhattan. It was the first along the famed "Canyon of Heroes" since the New York Yankees won the 2000 World Series, and the Giants' first parade in New York. (Because of acrimonious relations at that time between New York City and the state of New Jersey, the team chose not to participate in a Manhattan parade for its Super Bowl XXI championship in 1987, but instead held a "Victory Rally" at Giants Stadium in The Meadowlands. After their Super Bowl XXV championship in 1991, then-owner Wellington Mara chose not to hold any celebrations due to the Gulf War.) After six years in office, Bloomberg became the 14th consecutive mayor of New York City to preside over a ticker-tape parade. (In contrast, his predecessor, Rudy Giuliani presided over his first ticker-tape parade just five months after becoming mayor, after the Rangers won the Stanley Cup) Also attending were New York Governor Eliot Spitzer and Senator Chuck Schumer. Spitzer also announced the availability of a New York Giants Super Bowl XLII Champions custom license plate and issued a proclamation declaring the day "New York Giants Super Bowl Champions Day" throughout the state of New York.

Following the parade, the Giants held two victory rallies: one at New York's City Hall and another one two hours later at Giants Stadium in the New Jersey Meadowlands.

== Game summary ==
External videos
- Full game broadcast on Fox on YouTube

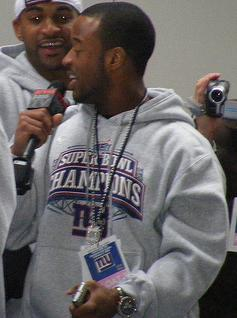
New York Giants' wide receiver Sinorice Moss at the Giants' Super Bowl parade, February 5, 2008

After scoring a combined 73 points in their regular season meeting, the teams scored a mere 10 points by the end of the third quarter, with the Patriots leading 7–3. The Patriots' record-setting offense gave up five sacks and one lost fumble, while the Giants' offense managed only five first downs in the second and third quarters. Yet in the fourth quarter, Eli Manning threw two touchdown passes, including the winning drive that culminated with a 13-yard touchdown pass to Plaxico Burress with 35 seconds remaining.

=== First quarter ===
The Giants won the coin toss and started the game with the longest drive in Super Bowl history, a 16-play, 63-yard march that consumed 9 minutes, 59 seconds, breaking their own record of 9 minutes, 29 seconds set in Super Bowl XXV, and featured four third-down conversions, the most ever on a Super Bowl opening drive. But the Patriots halted the drive at their own 14-yard line, forcing the Giants to settle for a 32-yard field goal from kicker Lawrence Tynes that gave the Giants a 3–0 lead.

The Patriots responded with their own scoring drive, as running back Laurence Maroney returned the kickoff 43 yards to his own 44-yard line, after which he rushed twice for 14 yards. Quarterback Tom Brady then completed three passes for 23 yards, but after two incomplete passes, the Patriots were faced with 3rd-and-10 on the New York 17-yard line. However, on that play, Giants linebacker Antonio Pierce committed pass interference by striking the helmet of tight end Benjamin Watson in the end zone, setting up 1st-and-goal for the Patriots at the 1-yard line.

=== Second quarter ===
Two plays later, on the first play of the second quarter, Maroney scored on a 1-yard touchdown run, giving the Patriots their first lead of the game, 7–3. The two teams each only had one drive in the entire opening quarter, a Super Bowl record. It was the first Super Bowl since Super Bowl XXXIII in which both teams scored on their initial possession of the game. On the Giants' first drive of the second quarter, on 3rd-and-7, wide receiver Amani Toomer caught a deep pass from quarterback Eli Manning along the left sideline while dragging his feet in bounds for a 38-yard gain, moving the ball to the Patriots' 19-yard line. But three plays later, Manning threw a pass that bounced out of the arms of wide receiver Steve Smith and into the hands of cornerback Ellis Hobbs for an interception.

The Patriots' ensuing drive resulted in a three-and-out as on 3rd-and-1 safety James Butler and defensive end Michael Strahan (who was playing in his final game) tackled Maroney for a 2-yard loss and the Patriots were forced to punt.

Then on the Giants' next drive, running back Ahmad Bradshaw fumbled a hand-off from Manning and linebacker Pierre Woods appeared to recover the ball at the Giants' 30-yard line. But after the officials picked through the pile, it was determined that Bradshaw had made the recovery. The Giants maintained possession and still had to punt. The Patriots' next drive ended with back-to-back 7-yard sacks, the first by linebacker Kawika Mitchell, and the second by defensive end Justin Tuck.

On the Giants' next drive, they moved the ball to the Patriots' 25-yard line, but linebacker Adalius Thomas sacked Manning and forced a fumble. Smith recovered the ball, but Bradshaw was flagged for illegally batting the ball forward before the recovery. The penalty pushed the Giants out of field goal range, and following an incompletion, they were forced to punt again.

After the punt, two 18-yard receptions by wide receivers Randy Moss and Donté Stallworth moved the ball to the Giants' 44-yard line. But with 22 seconds left before halftime, Tuck strip-sacked Brady and defensive end Osi Umenyiora recovered the ball. The game then went to halftime with the Patriots leading 7–3.

=== Third quarter ===
On the first drive of the second half, the Patriots had a 4th-and-2 and chose to punt. However, after the kick, Patriots head coach Bill Belichick challenged that the Giants' defense had 12 players on the field and replay confirmed that was the case as Giants linebacker Chase Blackburn was unable to get to the sidelines as the ball was being snapped. Therefore, referee Mike Carey reversed the play, and the Giants were penalized for having too many players on the field, giving the Patriots a new set of downs. The Patriots then drove to the Giants' 25-yard line, but Strahan sacked Brady for a 6-yard loss on third down (which was Strahan's final career sack), bringing up 4th-and-13 on the Giants' 31-yard line. Belichick decided against a 49-yard field goal attempt by kicker Stephen Gostkowski (near Gostkowski's season long of 50 yards) and tried to pick up a first down instead. Brady's pass to wide receiver Jabar Gaffney was incomplete as it went out of the back of the end zone and the Giants took over on downs.

=== Fourth quarter ===
After the teams traded punts going into the fourth quarter, Manning completed a 45-yard pass to tight end Kevin Boss. Following three runs by Bradshaw for 13 yards and a 17-yard reception by Smith on third down, Manning finished the 6-play, 80-yard drive with a 5-yard touchdown pass to usually unheralded wide receiver David Tyree, giving the Giants a 10–7 lead with 11:05 left in the game.

After the teams exchanged punts again, the Patriots got the ball at their own 20-yard line with 7:54 remaining. Brady then completed a 5-yard pass to wide receiver Wes Welker and a 10-yard pass to Moss, followed by a 9-yard run by Maroney to give the Patriots a first down at their own 44-yard line. Brady followed with a 13-yard pass to Welker, a 4-yard completion to running back Kevin Faulk, and then a 10-yard pass to Welker for a first down at the Giants' 29-yard line. After that, Brady found Moss for an 11-yard completion and Faulk for a 12-yard completion and New England now had 1st-and-goal from the Giants' 6-yard line. Following two incomplete passes, cornerback Corey Webster slipped while backing into coverage, leaving Moss wide open in the end zone where Brady found him for a 6-yard touchdown to give the Patriots a 14–10 lead with 2:42 left in the game.

On the ensuing kickoff, safety Raymond Ventrone leveled wide receiver Domenik Hixon after a 14-yard return, giving the Giants the ball on their own 17-yard line with 2:39 left and all three timeouts remaining. Following two receptions by Toomer for 20 yards, running back Brandon Jacobs kept the drive alive with a crucial 2-yard run off guard on 4th-and-1. Manning picked up 5 yards with a scramble on the next play. Then on 2nd-and-5, Manning’s pass was high and behind Tyree, but fell harmlessly out of bounds as Patriots cornerback Asante Samuel could not corral the pass for the potential game-ending interception. Play-by-play announcer Joe Buck was quick to note Manning’s visible frustration at the apparent miscommunication with Tyree on the play, which stopped the clock with 1:15 remaining. On the next play, 3rd-and-5 from the Giants' 44-yard line, Manning found himself in trouble as the Patriots' pass rush got to him quickly after the snap. He eluded Adalius Thomas, who missed Manning despite having the clearest shot at him, and then broke free from the grasp of defensive ends Jarvis Green and Richard Seymour, both of whom had the quarterback by the jersey but failed to hold him in the grasp. In what is considered to be among the greatest Super Bowl plays of all time, Manning then re-oriented himself and launched the ball deep down the middle of the field, where both Tyree and Patriots safety and multiple-time Pro Bowler Rodney Harrison were in position to make a play on the ball. Tyree outjumped Harrison to secure the ball, and maintained possession by pinning the ball against his helmet as he fell to the ground, clearly maintaining control for a gain of 32 yards and keeping the drive alive. Three plays later, on 3rd-and-11, Manning found a wide-open Smith for a 12-yard gain to the Patriots' 13-yard line, and Smith stepped out of bounds to stop the clock. On the next play, Hobbs was beaten badly to the outside by the 6'6" wide receiver Plaxico Burress on a "slant-and-go" route, allowing Manning more than enough room to find his big-bodied target for the touchdown. The score capped a 12-play, 83-yard drive to give the Giants a 17–14 lead and prompted a roar from the fans in Glendale, then a mere 35 seconds from potentially witnessing the first 19–0 perfect season.

The Patriots attempted one last desperate drive to either tie or win the game from their own 26-yard line with 29 seconds remaining and all three of their timeouts, but the Giants' defense did not allow a single yard. Following an errant pass attempt by Brady, defensive tackle Jay Alford sacked Brady for a 10-yard loss. The following play, a deep pass to Moss, was knocked away by cornerback Corey Webster, and Brady's 4th-and-20 Hail Mary pass in Moss' direction was batted down by safety Gibril Wilson, sealing the upset victory for the Giants. After the incompletion, it appeared that the officials would run out the clock, as it briefly read zero, before one second was re-added. Coaches, players, reporters, and fans crowded the field as if the game had ended. Belichick hugged Giants head coach Tom Coughlin at midfield, then left for the locker room. This early departure was later criticized by some sportswriters, but other reporters defended Belichick by noting that he did not snub Coughlin (which would have been surprising anyway because the two coaches were friends from their days working together for Bill Parcells in the 1980s) and that the outcome of the game had been decided. The delay lasted 2 minutes and 27 seconds before Manning kneeled out the final second and the Giants were officially crowned champions.

== Aftermath ==
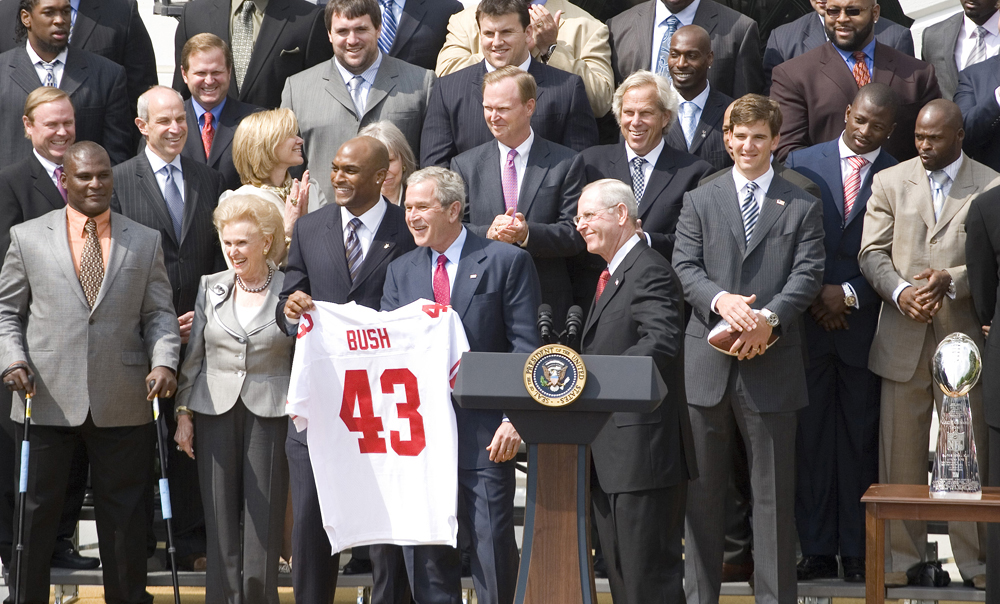
President George W. Bush hold a Giants jersey during the team's White House visit

Giants defensive coordinator Steve Spagnuolo later revealed in 2018 that his learned experience from Super Bowl XXXIX three years prior as a Philadelphia Eagles assistant coach influenced his preparation for Super Bowl XLII: the Giants hindered possible Patriots gamesmanship attempts to read the Giants' defensive play calls by using two signal callers instead of one, and the Giants disguised their blitzes until few seconds remained before the snap, leaving the Patriots offense less time to adjust. Spagnuolo would later win three more Super Bowls for the Chiefs as defensive coordinator.

The Giants' victory over the heavily favored Patriots in Super Bowl XLII is considered one of the biggest upsets in NFL history, and arguably one of the biggest upsets in the history of American professional sports.

=== Box score ===
Super Bowl XLII: New York Giants 17, New England Patriots 14

Quarter	1	2	3	4	Total
Giants (NFC)	3	0	0	14	17
Patriots (AFC)	0	7	0	7	14

at University of Phoenix Stadium, Glendale, Arizona

- Date: February 3, 2008
- Game time: 4:30 p.m. MST
- Game weather: 70 °F (21 °C), played with roof closed, retractable roof stadium
- Game attendance: 71,101
- Referee: Mike Carey
- TV announcers (Fox): Joe Buck, Troy Aikman, Pam Oliver, Chris Myers
- Recap

Scoring summary

Quarter	Time	Drive			Team	Scoring information	Score	
Quarter	Time	Plays	Yards	TOP	Team	Scoring information	NYG	NE
1	5:01	16	63	9:59	NYG	32-yard field goal by Lawrence Tynes	3	0
2	14:57	12	56	5:04	NE	Laurence Maroney 1-yard touchdown run, Stephen Gostkowski kick good	3	7
4	11:05	6	80	3:47	NYG	David Tyree 5-yard touchdown reception from Eli Manning, Tynes kick good	10	7
4	2:42	12	80	5:12	NE	Randy Moss 6-yard touchdown reception from Tom Brady, Gostkowski kick good	10	14
4	0:35	12	83	2:07	NYG	Plaxico Burress 13-yard touchdown reception from Eli Manning, Tynes kick good	17	14
"TOP" = time of possession. For other American football terms, see Glossary of American football.							17	14

=== Statistical overview ===
Manning completed 19 of his 34 passes for 255 yards, including a mark of 9-of-14 for 152 yards and two touchdowns in the fourth quarter, with one interception, to be named the game's Most Valuable Player. Manning also became the first quarterback to throw two go-ahead touchdowns in the fourth quarter of a Super Bowl. Toomer was the Giants' leading receiver, with 6 catches for 84 yards, and Bradshaw and Jacobs rushed for 45 and 42 yards, respectively. Burress had only 2 receptions for 27 yards, but one of those was the game-winning touchdown with 35 seconds left. The Patriots' offense recorded 274 total yards to the Giants' 338. While he never scored, Welker tied a Super Bowl record with 11 receptions for 109 yards. Moss had five catches for 62 yards and a touchdown, and Maroney rushed for 36 yards and a touchdown. Brady completed 29 of his 48 passes for 266 yards and a touchdown. Brady's 29 completions gave him a career total of 100 in his four Super Bowls, surpassing the previous record for Super Bowl completions that was held by Joe Montana at 83. Justin Tuck and Adalius Thomas were the top defensive performers for the Giants and Patriots, respectively, as each recorded five solo tackles, two sacks, and one forced fumble.

One key fact of the game was the number of possessions that reached the red-zone: the Giants made it four times and their defense limited the Patriots to two. The Patriots had six consecutive possessions that came short of reaching the Giants' 20-yard line. The game was the first Super Bowl in which neither team rushed for as many as 100 yards, with the Patriots held to 45.

=== Records ===
The Giants became the first team to win a Super Bowl in 3 different decades (1986, 1990, 2007). The Giants set an NFL record with 11 consecutive road wins in a single season. The Giants' matchup in Week 8 vs. the Miami Dolphins in London was an official Giants road game because it was originally scheduled to be played at Dolphin Stadium. The Giants were also officially classified as the "road" team for Super Bowl XLII based on the annual Super Bowl rotation where the NFC champions serve as the away team in even-numbered years, and as such, this was the Giants first championship game won on the road. Also note that the Week 5 game vs. the New York Jets was considered a "home" game for the Giants.

Patriots receiver Wes Welker tied the record for most catches in a Super Bowl, with 11. Welker was the fourth player to record 11 receptions in a Super Bowl, following Dan Ross of the Cincinnati Bengals in Super Bowl XVI, Jerry Rice of the San Francisco 49ers in Super Bowl XXIII, and Deion Branch of the Patriots in Super Bowl XXXIX. Demaryius Thomas in Super Bowl XLVIII would set a new record for catches.

With his fourth quarter touchdown pass to Moss, Brady became just the fourth quarterback with a touchdown pass in four different Super Bowls, joining Roger Staubach, Joe Montana and Terry Bradshaw. He also became the sixth quarterback to start at least four Super Bowls, joining Montana, Bradshaw, Staubach, Jim Kelly and John Elway.

The Giants opening drive consumed 9 minutes and 59 seconds, making it the longest drive in Super Bowl history. The drive was 27 seconds longer than the previous record, which the Giants had set in winning Super Bowl XXV against the Buffalo Bills.

Due to the length of the Giants' opening drive (which itself contained a record 4 third-down conversions), the first quarter featured only two possessions, a record for an opening quarter.

The three lead changes in the fourth quarter were also a Super Bowl record.

Although not a record, the 17 points scored by the Giants was the fewest points for a Super Bowl victor since Super Bowl IX.

This was the seventh consecutive Super Bowl where one team made the first score and the opponent made the second; that is a record.

== Final statistics ==
Sources: NFL.com Super Bowl XLII, Super Bowl XLII Play Finder NYG, Super Bowl XLII Play Finder NE

=== Statistical comparison ===
	New York Giants	New England Patriots
First downs	17	22
First downs rushing	4	3
First downs passing	13	17
First downs penalty	0	2
Third down efficiency	8/16	7/14
Fourth down efficiency	1/1	0/2
Net yards rushing	91	45
Rushing attempts	26	16
Yards per rush	3.5	2.8
Passing – Completions-attempts	19/34	29/48
Times sacked-total yards	3–8	5–37
Interceptions thrown	1	0
Net yards passing	247	229
Total net yards	338	274
Punt returns-total yards	3–25	1–15
Kickoff returns-total yards	2–39	4–94
Interceptions-total return yards	0–0	1–23
Punts-average yardage	4–39.0	4–43.8
Fumbles-lost	2–0	1–1
Penalties-yards	4–36	5–35
Time of possession	30:27	29:33
Turnovers	1	1

=== Individual leaders ===
Giants passing
	C/ATT^{1}	Yds	TD	INT	Rating
Eli Manning	19/34	255	2	1	87.3
Giants rushing
	Car^{2}	Yds	TD	LG^{3}	Yds/Car
Ahmad Bradshaw	9	45	0	13	5.00
Brandon Jacobs	14	42	0	7	3.00
Eli Manning	3	4	0	5	1.33
Giants receiving
	Rec^{4}	Yds	TD	LG^{3}	Target^{5}
Amani Toomer	6	84	0	38	6
Steve Smith	5	50	0	17	9
David Tyree	3	43	1	32	5
Plaxico Burress	2	27	1	14	9
Kevin Boss	1	45	0	45	2
Ahmad Bradshaw	1	3	0	3	2
Madison Hedgecock	1	3	0	3	1

Patriots passing
	C/ATT^{1}	Yds	TD	INT	Rating
Tom Brady	29/48	266	1	0	82.5
Patriots rushing
	Car^{2}	Yds	TD	LG^{3}	Yds/Car
Laurence Maroney	14	36	1	9	2.57
Kevin Faulk	1	7	0	7	7.00
Heath Evans	1	2	0	2	2.00
Patriots receiving
	Rec^{4}	Yds	TD	LG^{3}	Target^{5}
Wes Welker	11	103	0	19	14
Kevin Faulk	7	52	0	14	9
Randy Moss	5	62	1	18	12
Donté Stallworth	3	34	0	18	5
Laurence Maroney	2	12	0	8	3
Kyle Brady	1	3	0	3	1
Jabar Gaffney	0	0	0	0	3
Ben Watson	0	0	0	0	1

^{1}Completions/attempts ^{2}Carries ^{3}Long gain ^{4}Receptions ^{5}Times targeted

== Starting lineups ==
Hall of Fame ‡

New York	Position	Position	New England
Offense
Plaxico Burress	WR		Wes Welker
David Diehl	LT		Matt Light
Rich Seubert	LG		Logan Mankins
Shaun O'Hara	C		Dan Koppen
Chris Snee	RG		Stephen Neal
Kareem McKenzie	RT		Nick Kaczur
Kevin Boss	TE		Benjamin Watson
Amani Toomer	WR		Randy Moss‡
Eli Manning	QB		Tom Brady
Brandon Jacobs	RB		Laurence Maroney
Steve Smith	WR	TE	Kyle Brady
Defense
Michael Strahan‡	LE		Ty Warren
Barry Cofield	DT	NT	Vince Wilfork
Fred Robbins	DT	RE	Richard Seymour‡
Osi Umenyiora	RE	OLB	Mike Vrabel
Reggie Torbor	SLB	MLB	Tedy Bruschi
Antonio Pierce	MLB	OLB	Adalius Thomas
Kawika Mitchell	WLB	DB	Brandon Meriweather
Aaron Ross	LCB		Asante Samuel
Corey Webster	RCB		Ellis Hobbs
James Butler	SS		Rodney Harrison
Gibril Wilson	FS		James Sanders

== Officials ==
Mike Carey was chosen to be the head referee for this game, marking the first time that an African American has been chosen to be the head official in a Super Bowl. Carey had also officiated the most recent prior game between the Giants and Patriots. The full officiating crew was:

- Referee: Mike Carey #94
- Umpire: Tony Michalek #115
- Head linesman: Gary Slaughter #30
- Line judge: Carl Johnson #101
- Field judge: Boris Cheek #41
- Side judge: Larry Rose #128
- Back judge: Scott Helverson #93
- Replay official: Ken Baker
- Video operator: Jim Grant
- Alternate referee – Walt Coleman
- Alternate umpire – Dan Ferrell
- Alternate flank – Ed Camp
- Alternate deep – Carl Cheffers
- Alternate back judge – Greg Steed

== See also ==
- Super Bowl XLVI – rematch of Super Bowl XLII
- Super Bowl XLIX – the next Super Bowl to be held in that stadium (Patriots vs. Seattle Seahawks)
- Giants-Patriots rivalry
