= Helmet Catch =

Iconic American football play in 2008

New York Giants (5) (NFC) (10–6)	New England Patriots (1) (AFC) (16–0)
17	14
Head coach: Tom Coughlin	Head coach: Bill Belichick
	1	2	3	4	Total
NYG	3	0	0	14	17
NE	0	7	0	7	14
- Date: February 3, 2008
- Stadium: University of Phoenix Stadium; Glendale, Arizona
- Favorite: Patriots by 12.5
- Referee: Mike Carey
- Attendance: 71,101

TV in the United States
- Network: Fox
- Announcers: Joe Buck, Troy Aikman, Pam Oliver, and Chris Myers

The Helmet Catch was an American football play involving New York Giants quarterback Eli Manning and wide receiver David Tyree in the final two minutes of Super Bowl XLII on February 3, 2008. It featured Manning narrowly escaping a sack from three New England Patriots defensive players and throwing a forward pass, followed by Tyree making a leaping catch by pressing the ball against his helmet. The play, a 32-yard gain during a drive on which the Giants scored the game-winning touchdown, was instrumental in the Giants' 17–14 upset victory over the Patriots, who were on the verge of becoming the first National Football League (NFL) team to finish a season undefeated and untied since the 1972 Miami Dolphins, and the first since the NFL adopted a 16-game regular season in 1978. NFL Films' Steve Sabol called it "the greatest play the Super Bowl has ever produced". The play was also named by NFL Films as "The Play of the Decade (2000s)". Widely regarded as the greatest play in Super Bowl history, it was also the final catch of Tyree's NFL career.

== Background ==
Tyree had been used primarily on special teams and had only 4 receptions for 35 yards and no touchdowns during the 2007 regular season. Although Tyree was seldom used as a receiver during the regular season, he caught the Giants' first touchdown of the Super Bowl early in the fourth quarter, giving his team a 10–7 lead. On their next drive, the Patriots scored a touchdown on a pass from Tom Brady to Randy Moss to take a 14–10 lead with 2:42 remaining in the game.

On their next possession, the Giants faced a 3rd & 5 from their own 44-yard line with 1:15 remaining. On the previous play, Patriots' cornerback Asante Samuel dropped what could have been a game-sealing interception.

== Play ==
Manning was given the play call "62 Sail-Y Union" from the Giants' playbook in hopes of connecting with a receiver downfield. On third and 5 from the Giants' 44-yard line, Manning took the snap in the shotgun formation and immediately faced pressure from the Patriots defensive ends Richard Seymour, Jarvis Green, and linebacker Adalius Thomas. Green grabbed Manning by the shoulder while Seymour grabbed him by the back of his jersey and attempted to pull him down for a sack; had he been sacked, the Giants would have faced a fourth down with around 8 yards to go for a first, and would have needed to convert for the second time on the drive to keep their chances to win alive (halfback Brandon Jacobs converted on a 4th and 1 three plays earlier in the drive).

Manning, however, was able to stay on his feet and duck under the arms of the Patriot defenders before scrambling backwards into space at around the 34-yard line (Fox announcer Troy Aikman said after the play, "I don't know how he got out of there."). He managed to avoid getting sacked by Mike Vrabel and Junior Seau as he scrambled, then threw a high pass toward the middle of the field just before getting knocked down by Vrabel.

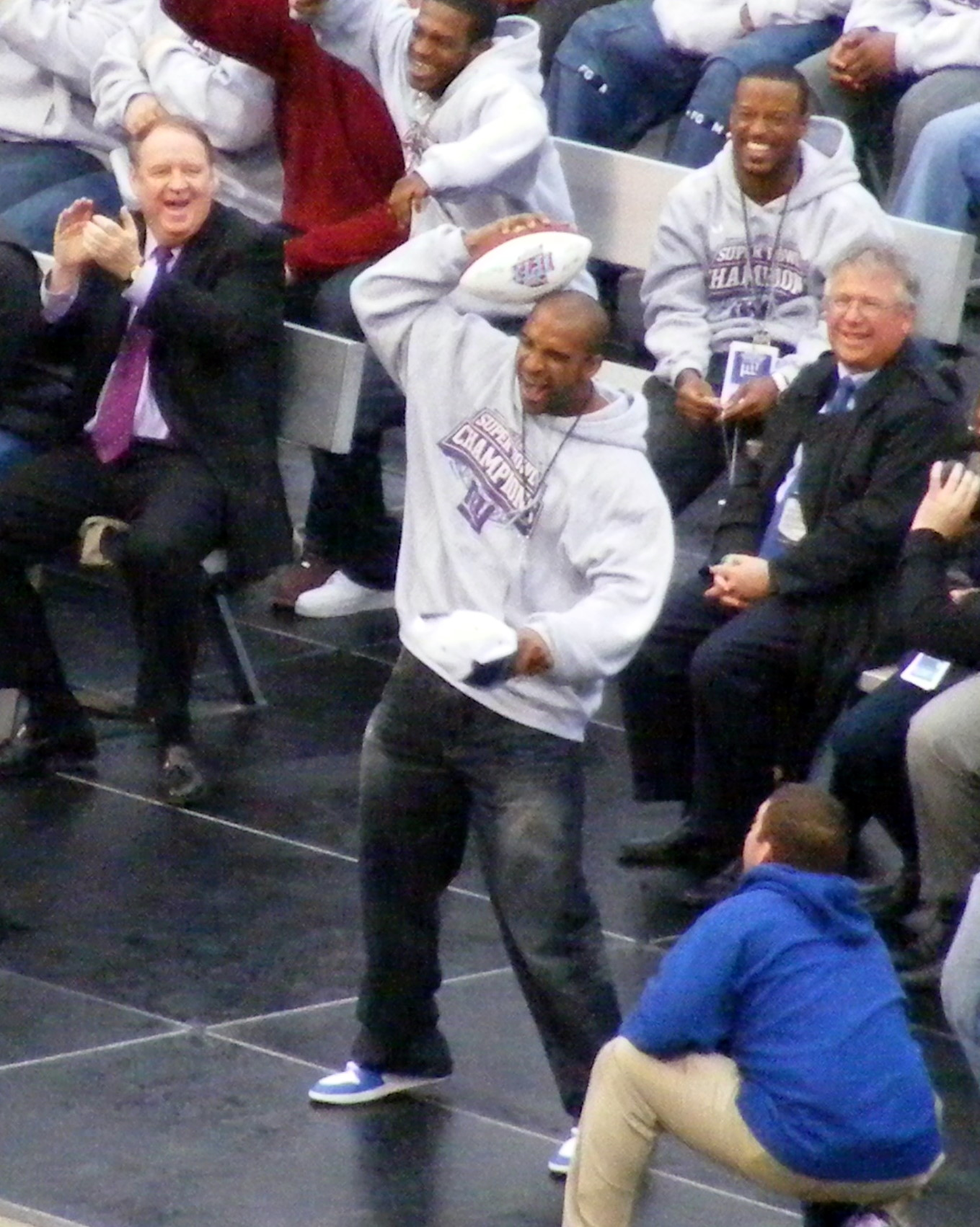
Tyree re-enacts his catch during the victory rally at Giants Stadium after the Super Bowl.

Tyree was thrown off his intended route thanks to tight coverage from Ellis Hobbs, and he moved toward the middle of the field to give Manning a downfield option once he saw the play develop. The ball reached the Patriots' 25-yard line, where Tyree was being shadowed by strong safety Rodney Harrison. Both men jumped for the ball, with Tyree getting both hands on it first. Harrison was able to jar the ball loose, but Tyree secured the ball against his helmet using his right hand while keeping his left hand on it; he was able to maintain possession as the two men landed on the playing surface, gaining 32 yards and giving the Giants possession in Patriots territory with :58 remaining in the fourth quarter. Four plays later, Manning would find Plaxico Burress in the end zone to give the Giants a 17-14 lead, and the defense stopped the Patriots on the next series to secure the victory, spoiling the Patriots' attempt to finish the season undefeated at 19-0.

== Nickname ==
Like other famous plays in the NFL, this play has been given nicknames, but largely due to two separate, unique occurrences in the play, consensus was not reached on a single name for some time. In 2009, readers of the New York Daily News voted on nicknaming the play "Catch-42" as the favored name in reference to Super Bowl XLII and the kind of coverage the Patriots deployed against the Giants' four-receiver set. Since then, David Tyree has adopted the "Catch-42" nickname as well as has ESPN.com. Other proposed nicknames include "The Escape and the Helmet Catch", "The E-mmaculate Connection" (a pun on the Immaculate Reception; the 'E' standing for Eli), "The Double Miracle", and "The Reception that Ended Perfection". "The Great Escape" was used by U.S. President George W. Bush during the Giants' White House visit. "David and Eliath" was also suggested by David Tyree due to the biblical reference. Bill Simmons named it "The Helmet Catch" five days after the game, and as time passed by, this became the consensus name for the play.

== Aftermath ==
The catch won the 2008 Best Play ESPY Award. The award ceremony featured a spoof by host Justin Timberlake, who "revealed" that he had left gum on David Tyree's helmet, which helped him catch the pass (since he caught it close to the top of his helmet). During the acceptance speech, Tyree jokingly stated, "Justin, thanks for the gum." Eli Manning also jokingly thanked his offensive line, "for giving me zero pass protection."

Tyree would never catch another pass in the NFL. He missed the following season with a training camp injury and played just 10 games in 2009, recording no receptions, before announcing his retirement in 2010.

In an NFC Divisional playoff game against the defending Super Bowl XLV champion Green Bay Packers on January 15, 2012, Manning threw a Hail Mary pass at the end of the first half, which was caught in the end zone by Hakeem Nicks, giving the Giants a 20–10 lead. Nicks caught the ball by cradling it against his head, which prompted commentators Joe Buck and Troy Aikman to note the similarity to Tyree's catch. Coincidentally, Buck and Aikman were also the commentators of Super Bowl XLII. The Giants would go on to beat the Packers 37–20, as well as win another Super Bowl against the New England Patriots (where Mario Manningham made a sideline catch compared to Tyree's grab).

== Legacy ==
"It’s probably the luckiest play in NFL history. No one really blocked anybody, I’m almost sacked, just kind of rolled out, throw it up for grabs, and David Tyree catches it off his helmet. That’s how we drew it up in practice. I never thought it would work, but sure enough, it did."

— Manning, 2017

Fox Sports lists Eli Manning's pass to David Tyree as the greatest play in Super Bowl history; editor Adrian Hasenmeyer called the play "an insult to physics and Albert Einstein". NBC Sports and NFL.com have also listed the play as the greatest Super Bowl play of all time. NFL Films founder Steve Sabol compared Manning to Fran Tarkenton and said that the play "defied logic, history, gravity and just about anything else you care to mention".

For the NFL’s 100th season, the play was declared #3 in greatest 100 plays in NFL history.

In 2025, the play was named as the #1 sports moment of the 21st century by The Ringer.
