= David Tyree =

American football player and executive (born 1980)

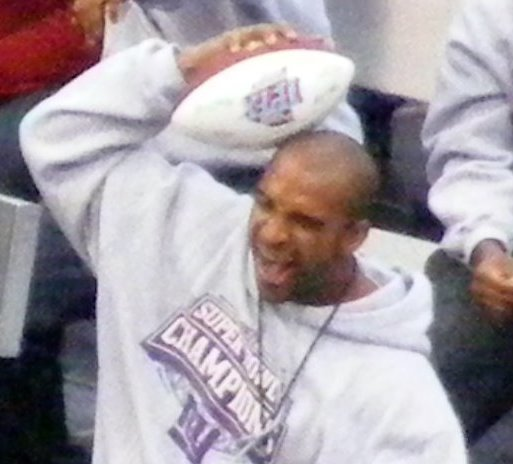
- Tyree reenacting the Helmet Catch during the Giants Super Bowl XLII victory rally in 2008

No. 85, 17
- Position: Wide receiver

Personal information
- Born: January 3, 1980 (age 46); Livingston, New Jersey, U.S.
- Listed height: 6 ft 0 in (1.83 m)
- Listed weight: 206 lb (93 kg)

Career information
- High school: Montclair (Montclair, New Jersey)
- College: Syracuse
- NFL draft: 2003: 6th round, 211th overall pick

Career history

Playing
- New York Giants (2003–2008); Baltimore Ravens (2009)

Operations
- New York Giants (2014–2017) Director of player development

Awards and highlights
- Super Bowl champion (XLII); First-team All-Pro (2005); Pro Bowl (2005); PFWA All-Rookie Team (2003)

Career NFL statistics
- Receptions: 54
- Receiving yards: 650
- Receiving touchdowns: 4
- Stats at Pro Football Reference

David Mikel Tyree (born January 3, 1980) is an American former professional football wide receiver who played in the National Football League (NFL) for seven seasons, primarily with the New York Giants. He played college football for the Syracuse Orange and was selected by the Giants in the sixth round of the 2003 NFL draft. Tyree is best known for the Helmet Catch, a late-game reception in Super Bowl XLII that helped New York secure one of the greatest sports upsets of all time.

Tyree earned Pro Bowl and first-team All-Pro honors in 2005 as a special teams player, but was utilized as a backup for most of his career. Nevertheless, Tyree earned recognition during the Giants' last drive in Super Bowl XLII when he caught a third down pass by pressing the ball against his helmet. Through his reception, the Giants were able to take the lead during the game's final minutes and defeat a New England Patriots team that was the first to win all 16 regular season games. The catch would also be his last and he retired in 2009 after one season with the Baltimore Ravens. Following the conclusion of his playing career, Tyree rejoined the Giants as their director of player development, holding the position from 2014 to 2017.

== Early life ==
Born in Livingston, New Jersey, Tyree grew up in a one-bedroom house in Montclair, New Jersey with his mother and two older sisters after his parents divorced. Tyree also played Youth Football for the Montclair Cobras where he went to Florida for a Tournament in the 8th Grade. He played high school football and was a three-year varsity letterman at Montclair High School, where he was selected as a Blue Chip Illustrated All-American.

== College career ==
Over Tyree's career at Syracuse, he ranked 13th on the career receiving record list with 1,214 yards, including 229 yards against Virginia Tech in 2002. He also developed a reputation for being an excellent special teams player, amassing six blocked punts.

== Professional career ==
=== New York Giants ===
Tyree was selected in the sixth round (211th overall) of the 2003 NFL draft by the New York Giants. While with the Giants, he was primarily a backup, never catching more than 19 passes in a single season. However, he was best known for his special teams play, earning a Pro Bowl selection in 2005 as a special teams player.

In 2008, Tyree was placed on injured reserve for a knee injury suffered during training camp after being on the physically-unable-to-perform list most of the season. He was released during the final cuts on September 5, 2009.

==== The Helmet Catch ====
During the 2007 regular season, Tyree had four receptions for 35 yards with no touchdowns.

Tyree made two key plays in Super Bowl XLII. First, he caught a 5-yard touchdown pass from quarterback Eli Manning, which was his only touchdown reception of the season and also the final of his career. The score gave the Giants a 10–7 lead late in the game. Later, on a third-and-five with 1:15 remaining and trailing 14–10, Manning eluded a sack and threw 32 yards downfield toward Tyree. In Manning's words, the ball "floated" high.

Tyree leaped and caught the ball fully extended, bringing it down against his helmet with his right hand, while the New England Patriots' Rodney Harrison pulled violently downward on that arm, simultaneously wrenching Tyree arching backwards towards the turf. Tyree, who got a second hand on the ball during the descent, seemingly kept the ball only inches from the turf, thereafter struggling successfully for possession while Harrison tried to steal the ball away from him on the ground. The play became known as the "Helmet Catch". "I told you. He's a gamer," Manning commented to his brother, Peyton, regarding Tyree, after the game. ESPN SportsCenter named it the greatest play in Super Bowl history the following day. It was later voted for the 2008 ESPY Award for Play of the Year. The pass moved the Giants to the Patriots' 24-yard line with 59 seconds left. Four plays and 24 seconds later, Manning threw a 13-yard touchdown pass to Plaxico Burress for the winning touchdown. The final score of Super Bowl XLII was Giants 17, Patriots 14. Tyree dedicated this catch, the last one he ever made in an NFL game, to his mother, Thelma, who died of a heart attack that year.

=== Baltimore Ravens ===
Tyree was signed by the Baltimore Ravens on October 13, 2009, after working out with the Tampa Bay Buccaneers. He appeared in ten games with the Ravens, but had no receptions.

=== Retirement ===
Tyree signed a one-day contract with the Giants to announce his retirement from the NFL as a Giant on July 29, 2010. On February 5, 2012, he watched from the Giants sideline as his former team beat the Patriots again in Super Bowl XLVI. On July 22, 2014, he was named Director of Player Development for the Giants.

== Personal life ==
Tyree battled with alcohol addiction beginning in middle school, and in March 2004, he was arrested by the Fort Lee Police Department for possession of marijuana. His then-girlfriend Leilah told him she was pregnant with their second child the day he was released from jail. Later that month, Leilah "presented Tyree with an ultimatum — her lifestyle or his." He began reading a Bible on her bed, and "for the first time, the words on the page made sense" to him. Tyree said from that day he never drank again. He and Leilah were married in June 2004. Tyree and his wife Leilah have seven children.

He is a born-again Christian and has made appearances at the 2008 and 2009 Christian concert "BattleCry". In 2006, he and his wife started Next In Line, a project that counsels teenagers in his hometown.

In 2011, Tyree became an advocate against legalization of same-sex marriage in New York with the National Organization for Marriage. Tyree said in an interview that the passage of the Marriage Equality Act would "be the beginning of our country sliding toward...anarchy". He said he would trade his famous catch and the team's Super Bowl title to keep marriage between a man and a woman. In 2014, he said he was no longer in support of gay conversion therapy and "would absolutely support any player on the Giants who identified as gay."

He is a cousin of former basketball player and current television analyst Jay Williams.

== See also ==
- History of the New York Giants (1994–present)
- Black conservatism in the United States
