= Rodney Harrison =

American football player and commentator (born 1972)

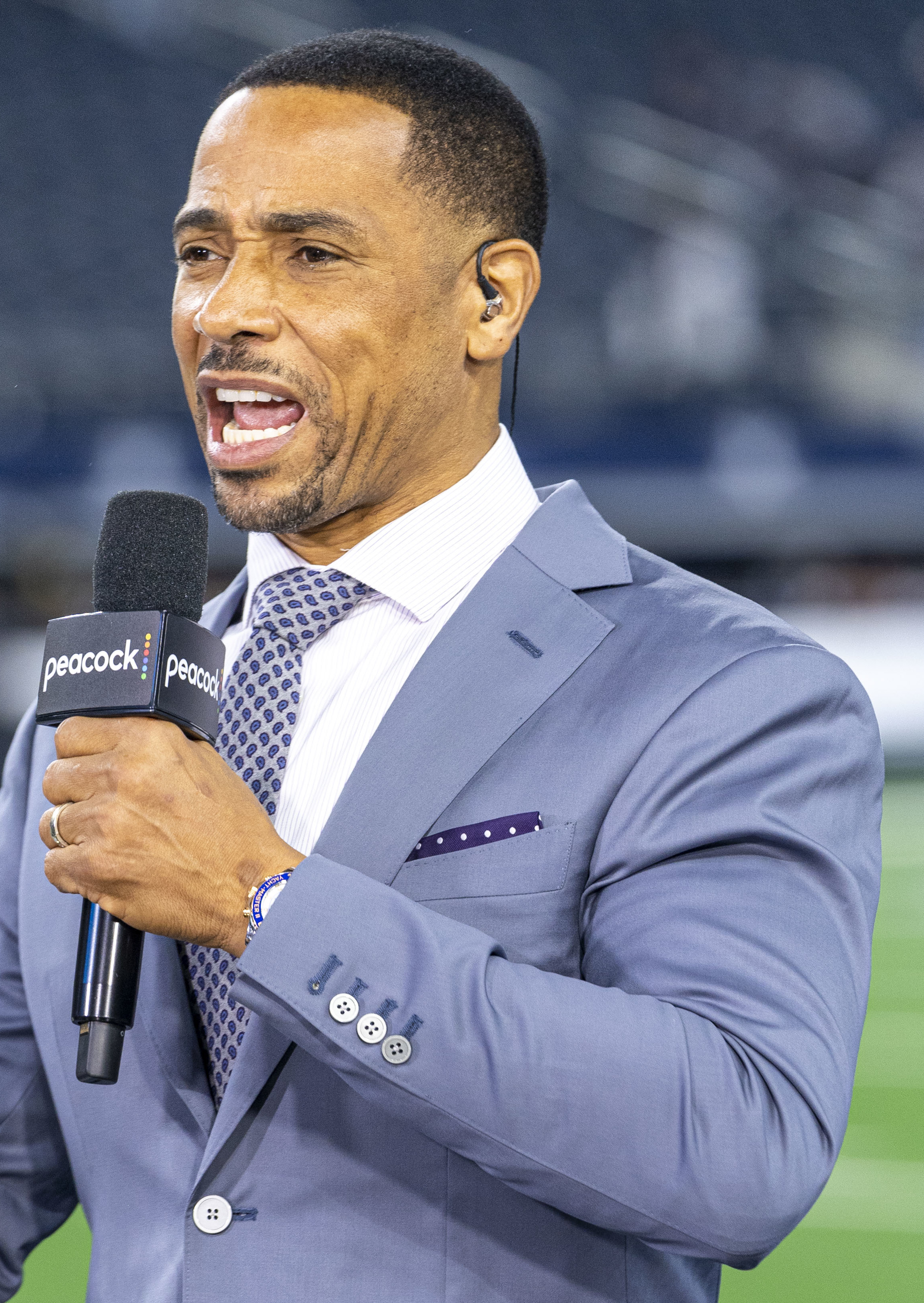
- Harrison in 2021

No. 37
- Position: Safety

Personal information
- Born: December 15, 1972 (age 53); Markham, Illinois, U.S.
- Listed height: 6 ft 1 in (1.85 m)
- Listed weight: 220 lb (100 kg)

Career information
- High school: Marian Catholic (Chicago Heights, Illinois)
- College: Western Illinois (1991–1993)
- NFL draft: 1994: 5th round, 145th overall pick

Career history
- San Diego Chargers (1994–2002); New England Patriots (2003–2008)

Awards and highlights
- 2× Super Bowl champion (XXXVIII, XXXIX); 2× First-team All-Pro (1998, 2003); Second-team All-Pro (2004); 2× Pro Bowl (1998, 2001); San Diego Chargers 50th Anniversary Team; Los Angeles Chargers Hall of Fame; New England Patriots 50th Anniversary Team; New England Patriots Hall of Fame; New England Patriots All-2000s Team; New England Patriots All-Dynasty Team

Career NFL statistics
- Tackles: 1,206
- Interceptions: 34
- Interception yards: 361
- Sacks: 30.5
- Forced fumbles: 15
- Fumble recoveries: 9
- Total touchdowns: 4
- Stats at Pro Football Reference

Rodney Scott Harrison (born December 15, 1972) is an American former professional football safety who played in the National Football League (NFL) for 15 seasons with the San Diego Chargers and New England Patriots. He was selected in the fifth round of the 1994 NFL draft by the Chargers, with whom he spent his first nine seasons, and was a member of the Patriots in his last six. After retiring from the NFL in 2009, he served as a commentator for NBC's Football Night in America through the 2025 season.

During his career, Harrison received two Pro Bowl and two first-team All-Pro selections. He holds the defensive back record for sacks and was the first NFL player to obtain 30 sacks and 30 interceptions. Harrison participated in four Super Bowls, winning two with the Patriots in Super Bowl XXXVIII and Super Bowl XXXIX. In recognition of his accomplishments in San Diego and New England, he was named to the 50th Anniversary Teams of both the Chargers and Patriots. He was also inducted to the Patriots Hall of Fame in 2019 and Inducted to the Chargers Hall of Fame in 2025.

== Early life ==
Harrison went to high school at Marian Catholic High School in Chicago Heights, Illinois. In March 2006, Marian Catholic retired Harrison's No. 37 jersey, although Harrison never actually wore No. 37 while in high school. His varsity numbers were No. 26 as a sophomore, No. 11 as a junior and No. 3 as a senior. He graduated from high school in 1991.

== College career ==
Harrison played college football at Western Illinois University from 1991 to 1993. He is the school's record-holder for tackles in a career (345) and tackles in a game (28). As a freshman, Harrison was a second-team All-Gateway Football Conference before being named a first-team All-Gateway pick as a sophomore and junior. The Associated Press also named him a second-team All-American as a sophomore and a first-team All-American as a junior. Harrison was suspended from the team and elected to enter the NFL draft.

== Professional career ==
=== San Diego Chargers ===
Harrison was selected in the fifth round of the 1994 draft, (145th overall) by the San Diego Chargers, the same year they made their only Super Bowl (XXIX) to date, which they lost to the San Francisco 49ers. Harrison became a starting member of the Chargers' 1996 defense, going to two Pro Bowls with the Chargers in 1998 and 2001. He set then-career highs with the Chargers in 2000 with 127 tackles and six interceptions; in 2002 he started 13 games and recorded 88 tackles in his final season with the Chargers.

=== New England Patriots ===
==== 2003 ====
Following the 2002 season, on February 27, 2003, Harrison was released by the Chargers. Two weeks later, on March 13, Harrison landed with the Patriots, signing a six-year deal. At the time, the Patriots had both Harrison and fellow Pro Bowl safety Lawyer Milloy under contract. Throughout the offseason, though, the Patriots and Milloy were involved in contract negotiations, with the Patriots requesting Milloy take a pay cut or be released. Milloy did not comply, and on September 2, he was released.

Prior to the 2003 season, Harrison was named a defensive captain in his first year with the Patriots by the coaching staff after Lawyer Milloy was released.

On January 10, 2004, in the divisional playoff game against the Tennessee Titans, he intercepted Steve McNair, which set up Antowain Smith's touchdown, as New England would hold on for a 17–14 win. In the AFC Championship Game the next week against the Indianapolis Colts, Harrison intercepted Peyton Manning in the end zone and forced a Marvin Harrison fumble, recovered by teammate Tyrone Poole. Harrison then went on to help the New England Patriots win their second title in three years, against the Carolina Panthers in Super Bowl XXXVIII, 32–29. He fractured his right arm late in the game, but a Tom Brady-led drive and Adam Vinatieri field goal secured the Patriots' victory. In his 10th year in the league, Harrison earned his first Super Bowl ring.

Harrison was also named to the Associated Press' All-Pro team following a 140-tackle (a 2003 NFL best for a defensive back) and three-sack season in which he started all 16 regular season games.

==== 2004 ====
The 2004 season produced a similar performance. Harrison helped New England's defense finish second in the NFL in scoring for 2004. For the second straight season, Harrison's 138 tackles led all defensive backs in the NFL. Harrison also started all sixteen regular season games for the sixth time in his career, holding together a Patriots secondary that was without Ty Law and Tyrone Poole for the majority of the season.

In the Patriots' divisional playoff game against the Colts, Harrison intercepted Peyton Manning late in the game to end the Colts' last chance. The next week in the AFC Championship, Harrison jumped a Ben Roethlisberger pass and took it 87 yards for a touchdown, helping the Patriots defeat the Pittsburgh Steelers, 41–27. During the week leading up to the Super Bowl, Harrison got into a verbal feud with Philadelphia Eagles receiver Freddie Mitchell after Mitchell claimed he "had something for Harrison" and did not know the names of the New England secondary. Harrison, in Super Bowl XXXIX, would record seven tackles, a sack, and two interceptions of quarterback Donovan McNabb, despite missing almost an entire quarter due to an injury sustained during the game. The second interception, with ten seconds remaining in the game, preserved a 24–21 Patriot win, ensuring a third championship in four years.

==== 2005–2008 ====
The 2005 season began a string of multiple injuries for the 12th-year safety, with Harrison's season coming to an end on September 25 against the Pittsburgh Steelers, when he was hit in the knee by a falling Cedrick Wilson and tore the anterior cruciate, medial collateral, and posterior cruciate ligaments in his left knee. Harrison was subsequently placed on the injured reserve list, ending his season.

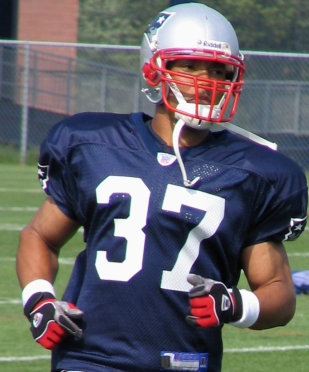
Harrison in 2006

Slightly over 10 months after his season-ending injury, Harrison returned to Patriots' practice for the first time on August 7, 2006. After sporadic playing time in the preseason, Harrison started the first seven of the Patriots' games in 2006, totaling 23 tackles and one sack. However, while making a tackle on Marvin Harrison against the Colts on November 5, Rodney Harrison injured his right shoulder and missed the next six weeks of the season. He returned to the Patriots in week 16, but his season was ended the following week in Tennessee after a low block from Bobby Wade injured his right knee.

Harrison was suspended for the first four games of the 2007 regular season for admitting to federal investigators that he knowingly obtained and used human growth hormone (HGH). Harrison stated to the media that he used "a banned substance" for "accelerating the healing process from injuries [he] sustained playing football," and "never to gain a competitive edge." In addition, according to federal agents and Harrison himself, Harrison received a shipment of HGH, with his name on it, just days before Super Bowl XXXVIII in February 2004. Later, he expressed regret over his decision to use the substance calling it "a black cloud over my career." "I played 15 years and that doesn't feel good. That's embarrassing...It wasn't smart. I put a foreign substance in my body and don't know the long-term effects," he said on Football Night in America.

In Super Bowl XLII, which concluded the 2007 season, Harrison was the player over whom David Tyree made his famous Helmet Catch, leading the New York Giants to victory 17–14 and handing the Patriots their first loss of the year, preventing a perfect season. In the play, a long forward third down pass by Eli Manning over midfield, Harrison was both attempting to block reception and tackle at the same time. Harrison was able to disengage one of Tyree's hands from the ball, but not both.

Harrison's 2008 season ended early when, in an October 20 game against the Denver Broncos, Harrison tore his right quadriceps femoris muscle on a play, was carted off the field, and placed on injured reserve.

=== Retirement ===
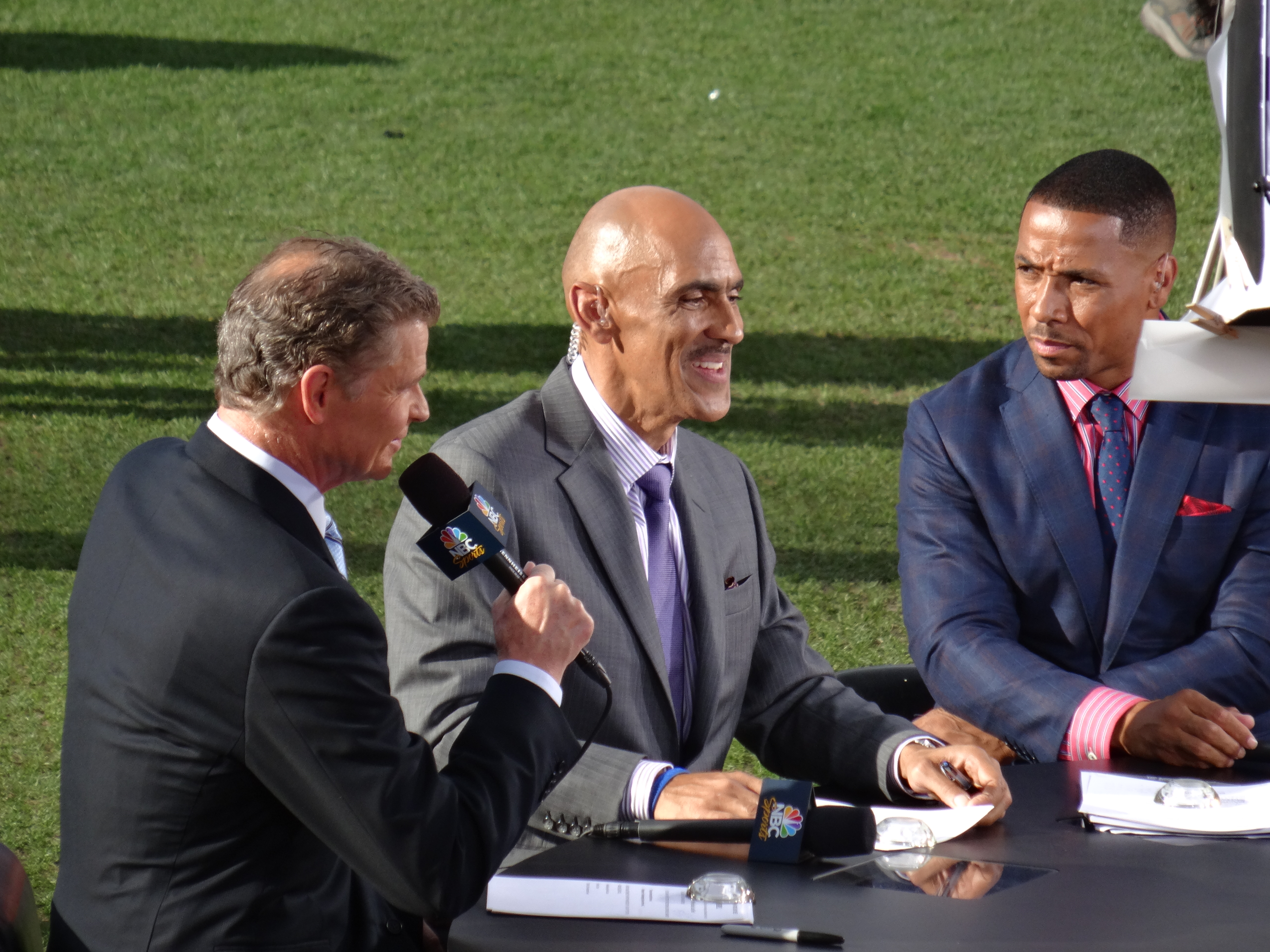
Harrison (right) along with colleagues Dan Patrick and Tony Dungy at an NFL game in Denver in September 2013

On June 3, 2009, Harrison announced his retirement from football to become an analyst for NBC Sports' Football Night in America. Patriots head coach Bill Belichick soon after called Harrison one of the best players he had ever coached.

=== Reputation ===
Harrison was voted the "dirtiest player" in the NFL by his peers according to a 2004 poll conducted by Sports Illustrated. In 2006, Harrison once again topped the "dirtiest player" voting by 361 other NFL players. In 2008, NFL coaches awarded the title to Harrison in an anonymous poll conducted by ESPN. He has also been fined and suspended multiple times, and as of 2002, had racked up over $200,000 in fines by the NFL. A notable suspension occurred in 2002 after a helmet-to-helmet hit on the Oakland Raiders' Jerry Rice. Harrison was the player during a preseason game against the then St. Louis Rams who hit Rams QB Trent Green low, resulting in a season-ending knee injury for Green, thrusting back-up and then relatively unknown QB Kurt Warner into the starting position. The Rams went on to win the Super Bowl that year and Warner was named NFL MVP and has been inducted into the Pro Football Hall of Fame.

=== Accomplishments and records ===
- In 1997, he became first player in NFL history to score touchdowns on an interception return, fumble return and kickoff return in the same season.
- He has the most sacks (30.5) of any defensive back in NFL history.
- All Time leader in Career Super Bowl Tackles (33)
- He had four interceptions in three games in the 2004-05 playoffs.
- His seven playoff interceptions (including one returned for a touchdown) are a Patriots team record.
- He is one of 12 players in the history of the NFL to record at least 20 interceptions and 20 sacks in his career, for which he is well regarded. The other members of this small club are linebackers Tom Jackson, Seth Joyner, Brian Urlacher, Wilber Marshall, William Thomas, Donnie Edwards, London Fletcher and Ray Lewis, safeties Charles Woodson, LeRoy Butler, Brian Dawkins, Lawyer Milloy and Adrian Wilson, and cornerback Ronde Barber.
- On October 21, 2007, he became the initial member of the 30/30 Club of players with both 30 interceptions and 30 sacks. He is joined by Baltimore Ravens linebacker Ray Lewis.
- Rodney Harrison has been voted by the fans as the 29th person to be inducted into the Patriots Hall of Fame.
- Harrison is set to be inducted into the Los Angeles Chargers Hall of Fame on October 23, 2025.
- San Diego Chargers 50th Anniversary Team
- San Diego Chargers 40th Anniversary Team
- New England Patriots 50th Anniversary Team

== NFL career statistics ==
Legend
| | Won the Super Bowl |
| **Bold** | Career high |

=== Regular season ===
| Year | Team | GP | Tackles | | | | Fumbles | | Interceptions | | | | | |
| Year | Team | GP | Cmb | Solo | Ast | Sck | FF | FR | Int | Yds | Avg | Lng | TD | PD |
|---|---|---|---|---|---|---|---|---|---|---|---|---|---|---|
| 1994 | SD | 15 | 3 | 0 | 3 | 0.0 | 0 | 0 | 0 | 0 | 0.0 | 0 | 0 | 0 |
| 1995 | SD | 11 | 25 | 21 | 4 | 0.0 | 0 | 0 | 5 | 22 | 4.4 | 17 | 0 | 5 |
| 1996 | SD | 16 | 124 | 104 | 20 | 1.0 | 1 | 1 | 5 | 56 | 11.2 | 29 | 0 | 13 |
| 1997 | SD | 16 | 131 | 95 | 36 | 4.0 | 1 | **2** | 2 | 75 | **37.5** | **75** | **1** | 8 |
| 1998 | SD | 16 | 113 | 87 | 26 | 4.0 | 1 | 0 | 3 | 42 | 14.0 | 21 | 0 | 11 |
| 1999 | SD | 6 | 41 | 30 | 11 | 1.0 | 1 | 0 | 1 | 0 | 0.0 | 0 | 0 | 8 |
| 2000 | SD | 14 | 107 | 90 | 17 | 3.5 | 2 | 1 | 2 | 51 | 25.5 | 22 | 0 | 13 |
| 2001 | SD | 16 | 126 | 100 | 26 | **6.0** | 1 | 0 | **6** | **97** | 16.2 | 63 | **1** | **17** |
| 2002 | SD | 13 | 86 | 67 | 19 | 2.0 | 2 | 0 | 2 | 2 | 1.0 | 2 | 0 | 7 |
| 2003 | NE | 16 | 126 | 92 | 34 | 3.0 | 1 | 1 | 3 | 0 | 0.0 | 2 | 0 | 11 |
| 2004 | NE | 16 | **138** | 94 | **44** | 3.0 | **3** | 0 | 2 | 12 | 6.0 | 12 | 0 | 8 |
| 2005 | NE | 3 | 15 | 11 | 4 | 0.0 | 0 | 0 | 0 | 0 | 0.0 | 0 | 0 | 1 |
| 2006 | NE | 10 | 50 | 35 | 15 | 1.0 | 1 | 1 | 1 | 2 | 2.0 | 2 | 0 | 3 |
| 2007 | NE | 12 | 68 | 54 | 14 | 2.0 | 1 | 0 | 1 | 2 | 2.0 | 2 | 0 | 7 |
| 2008 | NE | 6 | 45 | 27 | 18 | 0.0 | 1 | 0 | 1 | 0 | 0.0 | 0 | 0 | 2 |
| Career | | 186 | 1,198 | 907 | 291 | 30.5 | 16 | 6 | 34 | 361 | 10.6 | 75 | 2 | 114 |
