= 2008 New England Patriots season =

49th season in franchise history; first playoff miss since 2002

- Owner: Robert Kraft
- Head coach: Bill Belichick
- Home stadium: Gillette Stadium

Results
- Record: 11–5
- Division place: 2nd AFC East
- Playoffs: Did not qualify
- All-Pros: K Stephen Gostkowski (1st team); WR Wes Welker (2nd team)
- Pro Bowlers: K Stephen Gostkowski; WR Wes Welker

Uniform
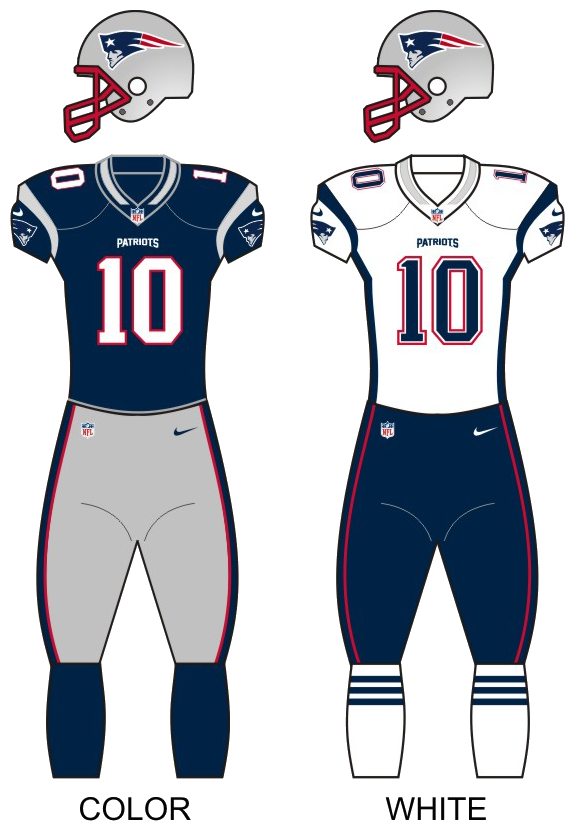

The 2008 season was the New England Patriots' 39th in the National Football League (NFL) and their 49th overall. The Patriots were defending AFC champions. Despite finishing the regular season with an 11–5 record, the Patriots did not qualify for the playoffs—becoming the first 11-win team since the expansion to a 12-team playoff in 1990 to miss the playoffs, as well as only the second team (after the 1985 Denver Broncos) since the NFL expanded to a 16-game regular season in 1978. They also were the first team since the 1935 Chicago Bears to go undefeated in the previous regular season and miss the playoffs the next season.

In the season opener, quarterback Tom Brady, the NFL's MVP in 2007, suffered a torn anterior cruciate ligament during their season-opening victory against the Chiefs and missed the remainder of the season. This was Tom Brady's only significant injury of his entire career. Backup quarterback Matt Cassel replaced Brady. Cassel led the team to a win in Week 2 against the New York Jets, his first start since high school. A loss the following week against the Miami Dolphins ended the Pats' record 21-game regular-season winning streak. This record was broken by the Indianapolis Colts in 2009.

Despite entering the last week of the season with a three-game winning streak, the Patriots found themselves not controlling their own destiny. In addition to a Week 17 win, they also needed either a Dolphins loss to win the AFC East, or a Baltimore Ravens loss to earn a wild card berth. However, both Baltimore and Miami won, and the Dolphins, Ravens and Patriots each finished the season with an 11–5 record. Miami qualified for the playoffs by winning the AFC East division over the Patriots on the fourth divisional tiebreaker (better conference record: 8–4 to 7–5). Baltimore qualified for the playoffs as a wild card team, defeating the Patriots on the second wild card tiebreaker (better conference record: 8–4 to 7–5). Because of this, the Patriots failed to win the AFC East and missed the playoffs for the first time since 2002. The Patriots would not fail to win another AFC East title or miss the postseason again until 2020, Brady’s first season of not being on the team.

== Offseason ==
=== Incidents off the field ===
Two days after Super Bowl XLII, safety Willie Andrews was arrested in Lowell, Massachusetts on February 5 for possession of one-half pound (230 g) of marijuana and driving an unregistered car. On May 9, Andrews' case was continued without finding for one year, during which time Andrews was ordered to pay a fine, speak to student athletes about the dangers of narcotics, and complete an NFL substance abuse program. On June 30, Andrews was arrested again and charged with assault with a dangerous weapon and unlawful possession of a firearm in Mansfield, Massachusetts, after his fiancée accused him of pointing a gun at her head. Andrews' fiancée called police, who searched Andrews' vehicle but did not find a gun; she later took her child to a hotel for the night, where Andrews then met her again before being arrested. The weapon, a Glock pistol, was later recovered in a dumpster near Andrews' apartment. Andrews was released on July 1.

On February 22, running back Kevin Faulk was issued a misdemeanor summons after he was found with four marijuana cigarettes at a Lil Wayne concert in Lafayette, Louisiana. Upon returning to New England, Faulk passed a drug test and did not have to enter the NFL's substance abuse program. Faulk pleaded no contest to the charge on July 8 and was sentenced to a five-month suspended jail term, given one year of probation, fined, and ordered to complete community service and substance abuse treatment programs. Faulk was later suspended for the first game of the 2008 regular season for a violation of the NFL's substance abuse policy.

On April 27, according to The Boston Globe, offensive tackle Nick Kaczur was arrested in Whitestown, New York, when police discovered Kaczur had a "small amount of controlled substance for which he did not have a prescription," which was later identified as oxycodone. Kaczur was charged with criminal possession of a controlled substance in the seventh degree, a misdemeanor. In May, the article states Kaczur participated in a Drug Enforcement Administration sting operation, wearing a hidden recording device while purchasing $3,900 worth (100 pills) of OxyContin. The three transactions, on May 1, May 6, and May 13 in the area near Foxborough, Massachusetts, led to the arrest of Kaczur's dealer Daniel Ekasala, who was indicted by a federal grand jury on June 3 for three counts of possession of oxycodone with intent to distribute. When The Globe asked for comment, however, Kaczur denied any involvement in the case.

=== Staff changes ===
Following the 2007 regular season, the Atlanta Falcons hired Patriots Director of College Scouting Thomas Dimitroff to be their new general manager. Former pro personnel director Nick Caserio, who had spent the 2007 season as wide receivers coach, returned to the personnel department as the director of player personnel, a position that partly replaced both Dimitroff's and Caserio's former responsibilities under Vice President of Player Personnel Scott Pioli. Regional scout Jon Robinson was also promoted to assistant director of college scouting. The Patriots then promoted offensive assistant Bill O'Brien to wide receivers coach to replace Caserio. Additionally, the Patriots announced secondary coach Joel Collier would not return to the team in 2008, and hired former Carolina Panthers and Houston Texans head coach Dom Capers as a special assistant/secondary coach. Don Davis, who joined the coaching staff as an assistant strength and conditioning coach and team chaplain after retiring in 2007, left the organization to pursue Christian ministry. Special teams coaching assistant Kevin Bickers was made a special assignment scout, and replaced by Brian Flores, formerly a pro scout. Former football operations assistant Shane Waldron re-joined the team as an offensive coaching assistant.

=== Departures ===
Prior to the start of free agency, the Patriots released linebackers Oscar Lua and Rosevelt Colvin, who had started 39 games in his five seasons with the team. Both ended the 2007 season on injured reserve and failed post-season team physicals. Tight end Kyle Brady was released at the start of free agency, also after having failed a physical. The Patriots declined multi-year contract options on wide receivers Kelley Washington and Donté Stallworth, making them both free agents; Stallworth signed with the Cleveland Browns, while Washington re-signed with the Patriots. Also departing via free agency were cornerbacks Asante Samuel (Philadelphia Eagles), Randall Gay (New Orleans Saints), and safety Eugene Wilson (Tampa Bay Buccaneers). Restricted free agent defensive end Rashad Moore was not tendered a qualifying offer, making him an unrestricted free agent.

=== Arrivals ===
After losing a combined 122 games of starting experience for the team in Samuel, Gay, and Wilson, the Patriots added back to their secondary by signing cornerbacks Lewis Sanders and Fernando Bryant, who were both released by their former teams, as well as two unrestricted free agents – cornerback Jason Webster and safety Tank Williams. Also signed via unrestricted free agency were wide receiver Sam Aiken, linebacker Victor Hobson. and tight end Marcus Pollard. Free agents or potential free agents Tedy Bruschi, Lonie Paxton, Kelley Washington, Randy Moss, Jabar Gaffney, Ray Ventrone, Mike Wright, Wesley Britt, and Pierre Woods were all re-signed.

=== Draft ===
As a penalty for violating the "league policy on the use of equipment to videotape an opposing team’s offensive or defensive signals" during a September 9, 2007 game against the New York Jets, the Patriots forfeited their original first round pick, which would have been the 31st overall pick due to their loss in Super Bowl XLII.

2008 New England Patriots draft
Round	Pick	Player	Position	College	Notes
1	10	Jerod Mayo *	LB	Tennessee	Pick from NO (Note: The Patriots traded their first- and fifth-round selections (#7 and #164 overall) to the New Orleans Saints for the Saints' first- and third-round draft picks (#10 and #78 overall). The #7 pick was received with a 2007 fourth-round pick in a trade from the San Francisco 49ers for the Patriots' first-round pick in the 2007 NFL draft. Boston.com summary)
2	62	Terrence Wheatley	CB	Colorado	
3	78	Shawn Crable	LB	Michigan	Pick from NO
3	94	Kevin O'Connell	QB	San Diego St	
4	129	Jonathan Wilhite	CB	Auburn	
5	153	Matthew Slater *	WR	UCLA	Pick from TB (Note: The Patriots traded their fifth- and seventh-round selections (#160 and #238 overall) to the Tampa Bay Buccaneers for the Buccaneers' fifth-round selection (#160 overall). The fifth-round pick was received in a trade with the San Diego Chargers in which the Patriots traded a third-round selection (#69 overall) to the Chargers for the Chargers' fifth-round pick in 2008 and second-round pick in the 2009 NFL draft. (The Patriots received the #69 pick in a trade with the Oakland Raiders in which the Raiders traded their 2008 third-round pick and 2007 seventh-round pick for the Patriots' third-round pick in 2007.) Boston.com summary (Tampa Bay trade), Boston.com summary (San Diego trade))
6	197	Bo Ruud	LB	Nebraska	
Made roster † Pro Football Hall of Fame * Made at least one Pro Bowl during career

== Staff ==
2008 New England Patriots staff
Front office: Chairman/CEO – Robert Kraft; President – Jonathan Kraft; Vice president of player personnel – Scott Pioli; Director of player personnel – Nick Caserio; Assistant director of college scouting – Jon Robinson; Football research director – Ernie Adams; Head coaches: Head coach – Bill Belichick; Assistant head coach/offensive line – Dante Scarnecchia; Offensive coaches: Offensive coordinator/quarterbacks – Josh McDaniels; Running backs – Ivan Fears; Wide receivers – Bill O'Brien; Tight ends – Pete Mangurian; Coaching assistant – Shane Waldron	Defensive coaches: Defensive coordinator – Dean Pees; Defensive line – Pepper Johnson; Linebackers – Matt Patricia; Special assistant/secondary – Dom Capers; Coaching assistant – Josh Boyer; Coaching assistant – Brian Flores; Special teams coaches: Special teams – Brad Seely; Strength and conditioning: Strength and conditioning – Mike Woicik; Assistant strength and conditioning – Harold Nash

== Opening training camp roster ==
As of the Patriots' first training camp practice at Gillette Stadium on July 24, they had the NFL maximum of 80 players signed to their roster. First-round draft pick Jerod Mayo, who was not signed until after training camp began, did not count against that limit until his signing.

New England Patriots 2008 opening training camp roster
Quarterbacks: 12 Tom Brady; 16 Matt Cassel; 7 Matt Gutierrez; 5 Kevin O'Connell ^{R}; Running backs: 38 Kyle Eckel FB; 44 Heath Evans FB; 33 Kevin Faulk PR; 39 Laurence Maroney; 34 Sammy Morris; Wide receivers: 88 Sam Aiken; 13 Chris Dunlap; 10 Jabar Gaffney; 17 Chad Jackson; 19 C. J. Jones KR; 81 Randy Moss; 14 Robert Ortiz; 18 Matthew Slater ^{R}; 41 Ray Ventrone S; 15 Kelley Washington; Tight ends: 87 Marcus Pollard; 82 Stephen Spach; 85 Jonathan Stupar ^{UR}; 86 David Thomas; 84 Benjamin Watson	Offensive linemen: 75 Lav Bauta G; 65 Wesley Britt T; 69 Anthony Clement T; 63 Dan Connolly C; 71 Russ Hochstein G; 67 Dan Koppen C; 72 Matt Light T; 70 Logan Mankins G; 60 Jimmy Martin G; 64 Gene Mruczkowski G; 68 Ryan O'Callaghan T; 74 Billy Yates G; Defensive linemen: 62 Titus Adams DE; 69 Steve Fifita NT; 76 Chris Norwell DE ^{UR}; 93 Richard Seymour DE; 95 Kenny Smith NT; 90 Le Kevin Smith DE; 92 Santonio Thomas DE; 94 Ty Warren DE; -- Zach West DE; 75 Vince Wilfork NT	Linebackers: 52 Eric Alexander ILB; 54 Tedy Bruschi ILB; 98 Shawn Crable OLB ^{R}; 48 Gary Guyton ILB ^{UR}; 59 Victor Hobson ILB; 53 Larry Izzo ILB; 47 Vince Redd OLB ^{UR}; 96 Adalius Thomas OLB; 58 Pierre Woods OLB; Defensive backs: 25 Fernando Bryant CB; 30 Mark Dillard SS ^{UR}; 31 Brandon Meriweather SS; 35 Mike Richardson CB; 36 James Sanders FS; 29 Lewis Sanders CB; 28 Antwain Spann FS; 21 Jason Webster CB; 22 Terrence Wheatley CB ^{R}; 24 Jonathan Wilhite CB ^{R}; 26 Tank Williams SS; Special teams: 3 Stephen Gostkowski K; 6 Chris Hanson P; 66 Lonie Paxton LS	Reserve lists: 97 Jarvis Green DE (Active/PUP); 42 BenJarvus Green-Ellis RB (Active/PUP) ^{UR}; 37 Rodney Harrison SS (Active/PUP); 27 Ellis Hobbs CB (Active/PUP); 77 Nick Kaczur OT (Active/PUP); 61 Stephen Neal G (Active/PUP); 76 Oliver Ross G (Active/PUP); 91 Bo Ruud ILB (Active/PUP) ^{R}; 50 Mike Vrabel OLB (Active/PUP); 83 Wes Welker WR (Active/PUP); 62 Ryan Wendell C (Active/PUP) ^{UR}; 99 Mike Wright DE (Active/PUP); Unsigned draft picks: 51 Jerod Mayo ILB ^{R}; Notations: R: 2008 Rookie; UR: 2008 Undrafted Rookie; Italicized players are not on the 80-man roster.

== Preseason ==
=== Schedule ===
Week	Date	Opponent	Result	Record	Venue	Recap
1	August 7	Baltimore Ravens	L 15–16	0–1	Gillette Stadium	Recap
2	August 17	at Tampa Bay Buccaneers	L 10–27	0–2	Raymond James Stadium	Recap
3	August 22	Philadelphia Eagles	L 17–27	0–3	Gillette Stadium	Recap
4	August 28	at New York Giants	L 14–19	0–4	Giants Stadium	Recap

== Regular season ==
=== Schedule ===
Week	Date	Opponent	Result	Record	Venue	Recap
1	September 7	Kansas City Chiefs	**W** 17–10	1–0	Gillette Stadium	Recap
2	September 14	at **New York Jets**	**W** 19–10	2–0	Giants Stadium	Recap
3	September 21	**Miami Dolphins**	**L** 13–38	2–1	Gillette Stadium	Recap
4	Bye					
5	October 5	at San Francisco 49ers	**W** 30–21	3–1	Candlestick Park	Recap
6	October 12	at San Diego Chargers	**L** 10–30	3–2	Qualcomm Stadium	Recap
7	October 20	Denver Broncos	**W** 41–7	4–2	Gillette Stadium	Recap
8	October 26	St. Louis Rams	**W** 23–16	5–2	Gillette Stadium	Recap
9	November 2	at Indianapolis Colts	**L** 15–18	5–3	Lucas Oil Stadium	Recap
10	November 9	**Buffalo Bills**	**W** 20–10	6–3	Gillette Stadium	Recap
11	November 13	**New York Jets**	**L** 31–34 (OT)	6–4	Gillette Stadium	Recap
12	November 23	at **Miami Dolphins**	**W** 48–28	7–4	Dolphin Stadium	Recap
13	November 30	Pittsburgh Steelers	**L** 10–33	7–5	Gillette Stadium	Recap
14	December 7	at Seattle Seahawks	**W** 24–21	8–5	Qwest Field	Recap
15	December 14	at Oakland Raiders	**W** 49–26	9–5	Oakland–Alameda County Coliseum	Recap
16	December 21	Arizona Cardinals	**W** 47–7	10–5	Gillette Stadium	Recap
17	December 28	at **Buffalo Bills**	**W** 13–0	11–5	Ralph Wilson Stadium	Recap
Note: Intra-division opponents are in **bold** text.

== Week 1 roster ==
New England Patriots 2008 Week 1 roster
Quarterbacks: 12 Tom Brady; 16 Matt Cassel; 5 Kevin O'Connell ^{R}; Running backs: 44 Heath Evans FB; 32 LaMont Jordan; 39 Laurence Maroney; 34 Sammy Morris; Wide receivers: 88 Sam Aiken; 10 Jabar Gaffney; 19 C. J. Jones; 81 Randy Moss; 18 Matthew Slater ^{R}; 15 Kelley Washington; 83 Wes Welker; Tight ends: 82 Stephen Spach; 86 David Thomas; 84 Benjamin Watson	Offensive linemen: 65 Wesley Britt T; 63 Dan Connolly G; 71 Russ Hochstein G; 77 Nick Kaczur T; 67 Dan Koppen C; 64 Mark LeVoir T; 72 Matt Light T; 70 Logan Mankins G; 74 Billy Yates G; Defensive linemen: 97 Jarvis Green DE; 93 Richard Seymour DE; 90 Le Kevin Smith DE; 94 Ty Warren DE; 75 Vince Wilfork NT; 99 Mike Wright DE	Linebackers: 52 Eric Alexander ILB; 54 Tedy Bruschi ILB; 98 Shawn Crable OLB ^{R}; 59 Gary Guyton ILB ^{UR}; 53 Larry Izzo ILB; 51 Jerod Mayo ILB ^{R}; 96 Adalius Thomas OLB; 50 Mike Vrabel OLB; 58 Pierre Woods OLB; Defensive backs: 37 Rodney Harrison SS; 27 Ellis Hobbs CB; 31 Brandon Meriweather SS; 21 Deltha O'Neal CB; 36 James Sanders FS; 29 Lewis Sanders CB; 41 Ray Ventrone S; 22 Terrence Wheatley CB ^{R}; 24 Jonathan Wilhite CB ^{R}; Special teams: 3 Stephen Gostkowski K; 6 Chris Hanson P; 66 Lonie Paxton LS	Reserve lists: 69 Anthony Clement OT (IR); 33 Kevin Faulk RB (Susp.); 61 Stephen Neal G (PUP); 68 Ryan O'Callaghan OT (IR); 76 Oliver Ross T (NF-Inj.); 91 Bo Ruud ILB (IR) ^{R}; 95 Kenny Smith NT (IR); 75 Barry Stokes T (IR); 26 Tank Williams SS (IR); Practice squad: 62 Titus Adams DE; 60 Jacob Bender T; 30 Mark Dillard SS ^{UR}; 42 BenJarvus Green-Ellis RB ^{UR}; 49 Vince Redd OLB ^{UR}; 35 Mike Richardson CB; 28 Antwain Spann FS; Notations: R: 2008 Rookie; UR: 2008 Undrafted Rookie; Italicized players are not on the 53-man roster.

== Results ==
=== Week 1 ===
Team	1	2	3	4	Total
Chiefs	0	3	0	7	10
• Patriots	0	7	7	3	17

- Date: September 7
- Location: Gillette Stadium, Foxboro, MA
- Game start: 1:00 p.m. EST
- Elapsed time: 2:49
- Game attendance: 68,756
- Game weather: Sunny; 75 °F or 23.9 °C; wind 15 miles per hour (24 km/h; 13 kn)
- Referee: Carl Cheffers
- TV announcers (CBS): Greg Gumbel and Dan Dierdorf

Scoring summary
Q2	11:49	NE	Moss 10 yard pass from Cassel (Gostkowski kick)	NE 7–0
Q2	:22	KC	Novak 40 yard field goal	NE 7–3
Q3	3:05	NE	Morris 5 yard run (Gostkowski kick)	NE 14–3
Q4	13:11	KC	Bowe 13 yard pass from Huard (Novak kick)	NE 14–10
Q4	2:30	NE	Gostkowski 37 yard field goal	NE 17–10

The Patriots began their regular season at home against the Chiefs. On the first drive of the game, a running-into-the-kicker penalty committed by the Chiefs on a fourth-down punt gave the Patriots a fresh set of downs, but three plays later, wide receiver Wes Welker fumbled after catching a pass from quarterback Tom Brady. The Chiefs recovered and started their next drive at their own 48-yard line but failed to convert on third down and punted. On the ensuing Patriots possession, the Chiefs again recovered a fumble by a Patriots receiver after a catch; this time wide receiver Randy Moss lost the ball after a 28-yard completion from Brady. After the throw, Brady was hit in his lower left leg by Chiefs safety Bernard Pollard, left the game, did not return, and was later placed on injured reserve with a torn ACL and MCL. Quarterback Matt Cassel replaced Brady for the Patriots' next drive, which began from the Patriots' 2-yard line. Seven plays after a 51-yard completion to Moss from inside the Patriots' 1, Cassel hit Moss in the end zone from 10 yards out for a touchdown, giving the Patriots a 7–0 lead early in the second quarter. The teams then exchanged three-and-outs twice, before the Chiefs ended a 13-play, 51-yard drive with a 40-yard Nick Novak field goal to cut the Patriots' lead to 7–3 at the end of the first half.

After a Chiefs punt on a drive in which Chiefs quarterback Brodie Croyle was injured on a sack by Adalius Thomas, the Patriots drove 80 yards on 11 plays, capping off the series with a 5-yard touchdown run by running back Sammy Morris to extend the Patriots' lead to 14–3. The next Chiefs drive began with backup quarterback Damon Huard replacing Croyle. The Chiefs drove 63 yards and trimmed the Patriots' lead to 14–10 on a 13-yard touchdown reception by wide receiver Dwayne Bowe. After three punts, Huard and the Chiefs began a fourth-quarter drive by throwing an interception to Patriots cornerback Ellis Hobbs; a 15-yard unnecessary roughness penalty on the Patriots caused their ensuing series to begin at their own 47-yard line. A handful of Morris runs and Cassel passes, including an 11-yard reception by Morris, brought the Patriots into the Chiefs' red zone, but the Patriots failed to convert on third down and settled for a 37-yard Stephen Gostkowski field goal to make their lead 17–10. Starting from his own 22-yard line with 2:20 remaining, Huard was strip-sacked on the third play of the series, but recovered his own fumble at the Chiefs' 27-yard line. On the next play, Huard hit wide receiver Devard Darling for a 68-yard completion, giving the Chiefs first-and-goal from the Patriots' 5-yard line with 53 seconds left. However, the Patriots' defense prevented the Chiefs from advancing another yard, as an incomplete pass, a Larry Johnson run for no gain, and two more incomplete passes gave the Patriots the ball back to seal their first victory of the season, and their 20th consecutive regular-season win.

=== Week 2 ===
Team	1	2	3	4	Total
• Patriots	3	3	10	3	19
Jets	0	3	0	7	10

- Date: September 14
- Location: Giants Stadium, East Rutherford, NJ
- Game start: 4:15 p.m. EST
- Elapsed time: 2:41
- Game attendance: 78,554
- Game weather: Partly cloudy; 90 °F or 32.2 °C; wind 12 miles per hour (19 km/h; 10 kn)
- Referee: John Parry
- TV announcers (CBS): Jim Nantz and Phil Simms

Scoring summary
Q1	3:04	NE	Gostkowski 21 yard field goal	NE 3–0
Q2	13:21	NE	Gostkowski 37 yard field goal	NE 6–0
Q2	7:32	NYJ	Feely 21 yard field goal	NE 6–3
Q3	6:24	NE	Morris 1 yard run (Gostkowski kick)	NE 13–3
Q3	:22	NE	Gostkowski 28 yard field goal	NE 16–3
Q4	11:04	NYJ	Stuckey 2 yard pass from Favre (Feely kick)	NE 16–10
Q4	5:22	NE	Gostkowski 27 yard field goal	NE 19–10

In their first divisional game of the season, the Patriots traveled to Giants Stadium, where they had not lost since 2000. On the first series of the game, the Jets drove to the Patriots' 13-yard line but the game remained scoreless after kicker Jay Feely missed a 31-yard field goal. Eleven plays later, the Patriots faced 3rd-and-goal from the Jets' 2-yard line, but a run for a loss by running back Laurence Maroney set up a 21-yard Gostkowski field goal to give the Patriots a 3–0 lead. After a Jets punt, the Patriots extended their lead to 6–0 on a 37-yard Gostkowski field goal early in the second quarter. The Jets responded with a 77-yard drive, highlighted by a 54-yard Laveranues Coles completion from quarterback Brett Favre, which brought them as close to the end zone as the Patriots' 1-yard line, but they again had to settle for a field goal; this time Feely completed the 21-yard attempt to cut the Patriots' lead to 6–3. The Patriots and Jets exchanged punts to end the first half.

After a Patriots punt began the second half, the Jets started their next possession from their own 23-yard line. Three offensive penalties later, with the Jets at 2nd-and-25, defensive back Brandon Meriweather earned his first career interception on an errant Favre pass, giving the Patriots the ball at the Jets' 31-yard line. Despite a Kris Jenkins sack of Cassel to begin the drive, the Patriots moved into the red zone on a 22-yard completion to running back Kevin Faulk on a 3rd-and-9 play. Three plays later, Morris ran it in from the Jets' 1-yard-line for a touchdown, extending the Patriots' lead to 13–3. On an ensuing Jets punt, a 24-yard Faulk return set up the Patriots' next drive at the Jets' 39-yard line; nine plays later, a 28-yard Gostkowski field goal gave the Patriots a 16–3 lead and ended the third-quarter scoring. Beginning from their own 20-yard line for the sixth time in the game, the Jets drove into the Patriots' red zone and then cut the Patriots' lead to 16–10 on a 2-yard touchdown catch by wide receiver Chansi Stuckey. The Patriots' next drive went for 71 yards and ended on a 27-yard Gostkowski field goal to build the Patriots' lead to 19–10. This would be the final score, as the Jets' next drive, which included a 20-yard sack of Favre by Adalius Thomas, went three-and-out and the Patriots held the ball for the final 3:45 in the game. The win brought the Patriots' record to 2–0 and kept the team tied for first place in the AFC East. Gostkowski finished the day 4-for-4 on field goals and earned five touchbacks on six kickoffs.

=== Week 3 ===
Team	1	2	3	4	Total
• Dolphins	7	14	7	10	38
Patriots	0	6	7	0	13

- Date: September 21
- Location: Gillette Stadium, Foxboro, MA
- Game start: 1:00 p.m. EST
- Elapsed time: 2:49
- Game attendance: 68,756
- Game weather: Sunny; 72 °F or 22.2 °C; wind 1 mile per hour (1.6 km/h; 0.87 kn)
- Referee: Bill Carollo
- TV announcers (CBS): Ian Eagle and Solomon Wilcots

Playing their second divisional opponent in as many weeks, the Patriots returned home looking for their 22nd straight regular season victory, a streak extending back to December 2006 when the Dolphins shut out the Patriots in Miami. Despite a 50-yard Hobbs return on the opening kickoff, the Patriots and Dolphins exchanged three-and-out punts to begin the game. On their second drive, the Patriots got as far as the Dolphins' 7-yard line, but back-to-back sacks of Cassel set up 3rd-and-goal, where Cassel threw his first interception of the season, to Dolphins defensive lineman Randy Starks. Starting from their own 26-yard line, the Dolphins drove into the Patriots' red zone in part from two catches by tight end Anthony Fasano from Chad Pennington for 47 yards. On 2nd-and-goal from the Patriots' 2-yard line, the Dolphins lined up with an unbalanced offensive line and with Pennington as a wide receiver and had running back Ronnie Brown take a direct snap from a shotgun formation; Brown proceeded to fake an end-around to running back Ricky Williams before running for the touchdown to give the Dolphins a 7–0 lead. This formation, known as the "Wildcat," was developed by Dolphins head coach Tony Sparano and quarterbacks coach David Lee following the Dolphins' loss to the Arizona Cardinals the week prior. The Patriots' ensuing possession reached the Dolphins' red zone again on 13 plays, but ended with the Patriots settling for a 37-yard Gostkowski field goal, trimming to the Dolphins' lead to 7–3 early in the second quarter.

The Dolphins' next drive began with a 33-yard reception by wide receiver Greg Camarillo; five plays later, Brown scored his second touchdown of the day with a 15-yard third-down run, extending the Dolphins' lead to 14–3. On their next drive, the Patriots reached the Dolphins' 28-yard line on a 21-yard completion by Welker on a Cassel pass that was tipped by Dolphins safety Renaldo Hill. However, the Patriots gained only two more yards before Gostkowski hit his second field goal of the day, this one from 44 yards out, to cut the Dolphins' lead to 14–6. On the first play of the ensuing drive, the Dolphins again employed a direct snap to Brown, who this time proceeded to hand off to Williams, gaining three yards on the play. With two minutes remaining in the first half, the Dolphins faced a 1st-and-10 from the Patriots' 45-yard line; Williams again took the hand-off on the direct snap to Brown, but this time went for 28 yards to put the Dolphins in the Patriots' red zone. Three plays later, the Dolphins again used the "Wildcat" formation, and Brown took the direct snap and ran five yards for his third touchdown of the day, giving the Dolphins a 21–6 lead at the half.

After an exchange of punts began the second half, the Dolphins drove from their own 21-yard line to a 3rd-and-3 from the Patriots' 19-yard line. The Dolphins again used the "Wildcat"; this time Brown threw a halfback pass to Fasano for a 19-yard touchdown that extended the Dolphins' lead to 28–6. Hobbs returned the ensuing kickoff 81 yards to have the next Patriots' possession begin from the Dolphins' 23-yard line. On 4th-and-3, Cassel hit wide receiver Jabar Gaffney for a 5-yard touchdown that cut the Dolphins' lead to 28–13. The Dolphins' ensuing possession featured Brown touching the ball on every play; after a first-down reception, Brown ran four times in a row to give the Dolphins a 1st-and-10 from their own 38-yard line. The Dolphins again lined up Brown to receive the direct snap; this time he ran 62 yards for his fourth rushing touchdown of the day, a Dolphins record.

Early in the fourth quarter, Hobbs returned the Patriots' next kickoff 31 yards, setting his own team record with 237 kickoff return yards in the game. Three plays later, Cassel fumbled on a third-down scramble that was forced by Dolphins linebacker Joey Porter and recovered by Dolphins defensive lineman Phillip Merling at the Patriots' 49-yard line. After a Dolphins' three-and-out, the Patriots began their next drive with a Cassel interception thrown to Hill that was negated on a roughing the passer penalty on defensive end Vonnie Holliday; the Patriots punted four plays later. The Dolphins' next drive ended in a 39-yard Dan Carpenter field goal that gave the Dolphins a 38–13 lead. After an unsuccessful fourth-down conversion attempt on a pass by backup Patriots quarterback Kevin O'Connell and a Dolphins punt, that score became the final. The loss dropped the Patriots to 2–1 and to second place in the AFC East and remained a game behind the Buffalo Bills.

=== Week 5 ===
Team	1	2	3	4	Total
• Patriots	7	10	7	6	30
49ers	14	0	0	7	21

- Date: October 5
- Location: Candlestick Park, San Francisco, CA
- Game start: 4:15 p.m. EST
- Elapsed time: 3:10
- Game attendance: 67,650
- Game weather: Sunny; 67 °F or 19.4 °C; wind 8 miles per hour (13 km/h; 7.0 kn)
- Referee: Mike Carey
- TV announcers (CBS): Dick Enberg, Randy Cross, and Dan Fouts

Scoring summary
Q1	9:05	SF	Gore O'Sullivan (Nedney kick)	SF 7–0
Q1	7:44	NE	Moss 66 yard pass from Cassel (Gostkowski kick)	Tie 7–7
Q1	5:31	SF	Bruce 6 yard pass from O'Sullivan (Nedney kick)	SF 14–7
Q2	5:27	NE	Gostkowski 35 yard field goal	SF 14–10
Q2	:09	NE	Faulk 2 yard run (Gostkowski kick)	NE 17–14
Q3	5:30	NE	Faulk 2 yard run (Gostkowski kick)	NE 24–14
Q4	14:57	NE	Gostkowski 40 yard field goal	NE 27–14
Q4	10:29	SF	Bruce 5 yard pass from O'Sullivan (Nedney kick)	NE 27–21
Q4	4:47	NE	Gostkowski 49 yard field goal	NE 30–21

Coming off their bye week, the Patriots traveled to Candlestick Park to face the 49ers in the first of two straight West Coast games for the Patriots. After a 49ers punt on their first series started the game, Cassel's second pass of the game was intercepted by linebacker Takeo Spikes to give the 49ers the ball at the Patriots' 45-yard line. On the next play, 49ers quarterback J. T. O'Sullivan threw an interception of his own, this one to Meriweather at the Patriots' 4-yard line. A three-and-out for the Patriots on their ensuing drive ended in a 35-yard Chris Hanson punt that gave the 49ers the ball at the Patriots' 30-yard line to begin their next drive. A defensive holding penalty on Patriots cornerback Deltha O'Neal on third down extended the drive, leading to a 16-yard touchdown catch by running back Frank Gore that gave the 49ers a 7–0 lead. On the Patriots' next drive, a fumbled snap by Cassel set up 3rd and 8 from the Patriots' own 34-yard line; Cassel then threw a deep pass to Moss, which was caught at the 49ers' 21-yard line and run in for a 66-yard touchdown that tied the game at 7–7. A 38-yard Isaac Bruce reception from O'Sullivan on the 49ers' ensuing possession backed the Patriots' defense up to their own 22-yard line, and two plays later, O'Sullivan and Bruce again connected on a pass, this one a touchdown from 6 yards out to give the 49ers a 14–7 lead.

An exchange of punts brought the teams into the second quarter, where on the third play of a Patriots drive Cassel threw his second interception of the day, this one to Nate Clements on the 49ers' 6-yard line on a deep pass intended to Moss. The 49ers went three-and-out, leading to a 13-play, 40-yard Patriots drive where a third down sack of Cassel in the red zone set up a 35-yard Gostkowski field goal that trimmed the 49ers' lead to 14–10. The 49ers punted again on their next possession, giving the Patriots the ball on their own 20-yard line with just over three minutes remaining in the first half. 11 plays later, the Patriots faced a 2nd and goal from the 49ers' 2-yard line, where a Faulk touchdown run gave the Patriots a 17–14 lead at halftime.

On the Patriots' opening possession of the second half, Cassel was sacked to begin the drive, and then again was sacked nine plays later on third down to force the Patriots to punt. Two plays later, O'Sullivan was intercepted by safety Rodney Harrison to give the Patriots the ball at the 49ers' 24-yard line. The Patriots reached the 49ers' 1-yard line, but were denied the end zone twice by the 49ers, setting up fourth down from the 2-yard line. Faulk took the direct snap on the play and ran in for his second touchdown of the game, giving the Patriots a 24–14 lead. Following a 49ers punt, an 8-play Patriots drive resulted in a 40-yard Gostkowski field goal that extended the Patriots lead to 27–14 early in the fourth quarter.

Starting from their own 20-yard line, the 49ers began an 11-play drive that ended on a 5-yard touchdown catch by Bruce from O'Sullivan that cut the Patriots' lead to 27–21. The Patriots responded with a 10-play series of their own; six plays into the drive, Faulk caught a second-down pass and was originally deemed to be down short of the first down, but the Patriots challenged the play and Faulk was found to have gained the necessary first down yardage. An offensive pass interference penalty on Moss set up a 3rd and 20 that the Patriots did not convert; Gostkowski then hit a 49 yard field goal to extend the Patriots' lead to 30–21. A third-down sack of O'Sullivan led to a fourth-down interception by O'Neal that gave the Patriots the ball with 2:45 remaining in the game. The 49ers used all of their timeouts during the Patriots' next possession, and after a Patriots punt, the 49ers failed to convert on fourth down to give the Patriots the ball to end the game.

=== Week 6 ===
Team	1	2	3	4	Total
Patriots	0	3	0	7	10
• Chargers	10	7	10	3	30

- Date: October 12
- Location: Qualcomm Stadium, San Diego, CA
- Game start: 8:15 p.m. EST
- Elapsed time: 3:03
- Game attendance: 68,704
- Game weather: Sunny; 69 °F or 20.6 °C; wind 8 miles per hour (13 km/h; 7.0 kn)
- Referee: Bill Leavy
- TV announcers (NBC): Al Michaels, John Madden, and Andrea Kremer

Facing their second West Coast game in as many weeks, the Patriots elected to practice at San José State University and to stay in Santa Clara, California in advance of flying to San Diego to face the Chargers in a Sunday night game at Qualcomm Stadium. On the first play of the game, Chargers quarterback Philip Rivers completed a 48-yard pass to wide receiver Vincent Jackson that brought the Chargers to the Patriots' 32-yard line. Three incomplete passes by Rivers from the Patriots' 7-yard line set up a 25-yard Nate Kaeding field goal that gave the Chargers a 3–0 lead. On their first possession, the Patriots reached the Chargers' 31-yard line, where Gostkowski missed a 48-yard field goal, his first such miss of the season. Four plays later, Rivers hit wide receiver Malcom Floyd on a 49-yard touchdown catch that extended the Chargers' lead to 10–0. The Patriots punted on their ensuing possession; the Chargers' Darren Sproles returned the punt 28 yards to start the Chargers' next drive from the Patriots' 45-yard line. A failed third-down conversion by the Chargers set up a missed 44-yard field goal attempt by Kaeding.

An exchange of punts early in the second quarter gave the Patriots starting field position at the Chargers' 43-yard line; seven plays later, Gostkowski hit a 47-yard field goal to cut the Chargers' lead to 10–3. After a Chargers punt set up the Patriots' next drive to begin from their own 6-yard line, the Patriots went three-and-out and a Jerod Mayo facemask penalty on the resulting punt gave the Chargers the ball at the Patriots' 31-yard line. Four plays later, Rivers extended the Chargers' lead to 17–3 on a 4-yard pass to Jackson. The Patriots began their next drive with a Marques Harris strip-sack of Cassel that was recovered by offensive tackle Mark LeVoir; the Patriots then ran out the clock to end the first half.

Starting from their own 22-yard line to begin the second half, the Patriots drove to the Chargers' 1-yard line on eight-straight Cassel passes or scrambles, the last of which was a 28-yard catch by Morris. However, the Chargers denied the Patriots the final yard needed for the touchdown on three straight downs, and on fourth down from the 1-yard line, Cassel was sacked to turn the ball over on downs. A 59-yard reception by Jackson on the second play of the Chargers' next drive as well as a 32-yard defensive pass interference penalty on Hobbs brought the Chargers to the Patriots' 1-yard line, where tight end Antonio Gates caught a 1-yard pass from Rivers that extended the Chargers' lead to 24–3. On the next play from scrimmage, Cassel was intercepted by cornerback Quentin Jammer, giving the Chargers the ball on the Patriots' 26-yard line; Kaeding would later hit a 35-yard field goal to give the Chargers a 27–3 lead. A three-and-out by the Patriots on their next possession led to a 13-play, 77-yard Chargers drive that ended with the Patriots not allowing the Chargers past the Patriots' 5-yard line on three straight plays. On fourth down, Kaeding completed a 23-yard field goal that made the score 30–3 in favor of the Chargers early in the fourth quarter.

The Patriots' next drive spanned six plays and lost two yards total, ending in a 23-yard Hanson punt on 4th-and-25. However, the Chargers gave the ball right back to the Patriots on the first play of their ensuing possession, a fumble by running back Jacob Hester. Starting from the Chargers' 46-yard line, the Patriots drove to the Chargers' 1-yard line on seven plays, four of which were Faulk runs, and then scored on a 1-yard Morris touchdown run that cut the Chargers' lead to 30–10 with just over five minutes to play in the game. After a Chargers punt, the Patriots moved the ball into the red zone in the final minutes but no further to end the game and drop the Patriots' record to 3–2.

=== Week 7 ===
Team	1	2	3	4	Total
Broncos	0	0	0	7	7
• Patriots	6	14	14	7	41

- Date: October 20
- Location: Gillette Stadium, Foxboro, MA
- Game start: 8:30 p.m. EST
- Elapsed time: 3:00
- Game attendance: 68,756
- Game weather: Clear; 40 °F or 4.4 °C; no wind
- Referee: Alberto Riveron
- TV announcers (ESPN^{[a]}): Mike Tirico, Ron Jaworski, Tony Kornheiser, Michele Tafoya, and Suzy Kolber

Scoring summary
Q1	5:14	NE	Gostkowski 31 yard field goal	NE 3–0
Q1	2:11	NE	Gostkowski 40 yard field goal	NE 6–0
Q2	7:37	NE	Morris 4 yard run (Gostkowski kick)	NE 13–0
Q2	:51	NE	Moss 13 yard pass from Cassel (Gostkowski kick)	NE 20–0
Q3	7:40	NE	Moss 27 yard pass from Cassel (Gostkowski kick)	NE 27–0
Q3	2:27	NE	Welker 6 yard pass from Cassel (Gostkowski kick)	NE 34–0
Q4	13:26	DEN	Graham 10 yard pass from Cutler (Prater kick)	NE 34–7
Q4	3:13	NE	Green-Ellis 1 yard run (Gostkowski kick)	NE 41–7

In their first home game in nearly a month, the Patriots faced the Broncos, winners of 16 of the last 19 games between the two teams, on Monday Night Football; earlier that day, the Patriots placed Maroney on injured reserve with a shoulder injury after he had missed two of the team's last three games, and activated guard Stephen Neal from the physically unable to perform list. After winning the coin toss, the Patriots deferred their pick to the start of the second half; the Broncos elected to receive. On the opening series, Broncos quarterback Jay Cutler injured his finger on the first play, but led the Broncos into Patriots territory, where running back Andre Hall, who replaced injured starter Michael Pittman two plays prior, fumbled at the Patriots' 30-yard line; Patriots defensive lineman Le Kevin Smith's recovery gave the Patriots the ball at their own 32-yard line to begin their first drive. A 29-yard reception by Watson brought the Patriots into the Broncos' red zone, where the drive ended and a 31-yard Gostkowski field goal gave the Patriots a 3–0 lead. On the fourth play of the Broncos' ensuing drive, Hall fumbled again; this time, a scramble for the ball pushed it 25 yards in the Patriots' favor to the Broncos' 37-yard line, where Mayo recovered it. A Broncos unnecessary roughness penalty on the play gave the ball to the Patriots at the Broncos' 22-yard line, but after failing to make a first down, a 40-yard Gostkowski field goal extended the Patriots' lead to 6–0.

An exchange of three punts brought the game into the second quarter, where Morris ran for 34 yards on the second play of a Patriots drive to put them in the Broncos' red zone yet again. Four plays later, on 4th-and-1 from the Broncos' 4-yard line, Morris ran for a 4-yard touchdown that gave the Patriots a 13–0 lead. The Broncos' next drive ended with Meriweather intercepting a deep throw by Cutler, setting up the Patriots' next series at their own 16-yard line. After a sack of Cassel put the Patriots even deeper into their own territory, a facemask penalty on Cassel on third down by Broncos linebacker Jamie Winborn gave the Patriots a new set of downs. Five plays later, on another 4th-and-1, Morris ran for 29 yards to give the Patriots a first down from the Broncos' 13-yard line; he ran for a total of 138 yards on 16 carries. On the next play, Moss caught a 13-yard touchdown pass from Cassel to extend the Patriots' lead to 20–0. The Broncos' next drive began with backup Patrick Ramsey replacing Cutler at quarterback. On the fourth play, defensive lineman Mike Wright sacked Ramsey and forced a fumble, which undrafted free agent linebacker Gary Guyton caught to give the Patriots the ball at midfield. Cassel suffered his fifth sack on the next play, the final of the first half.

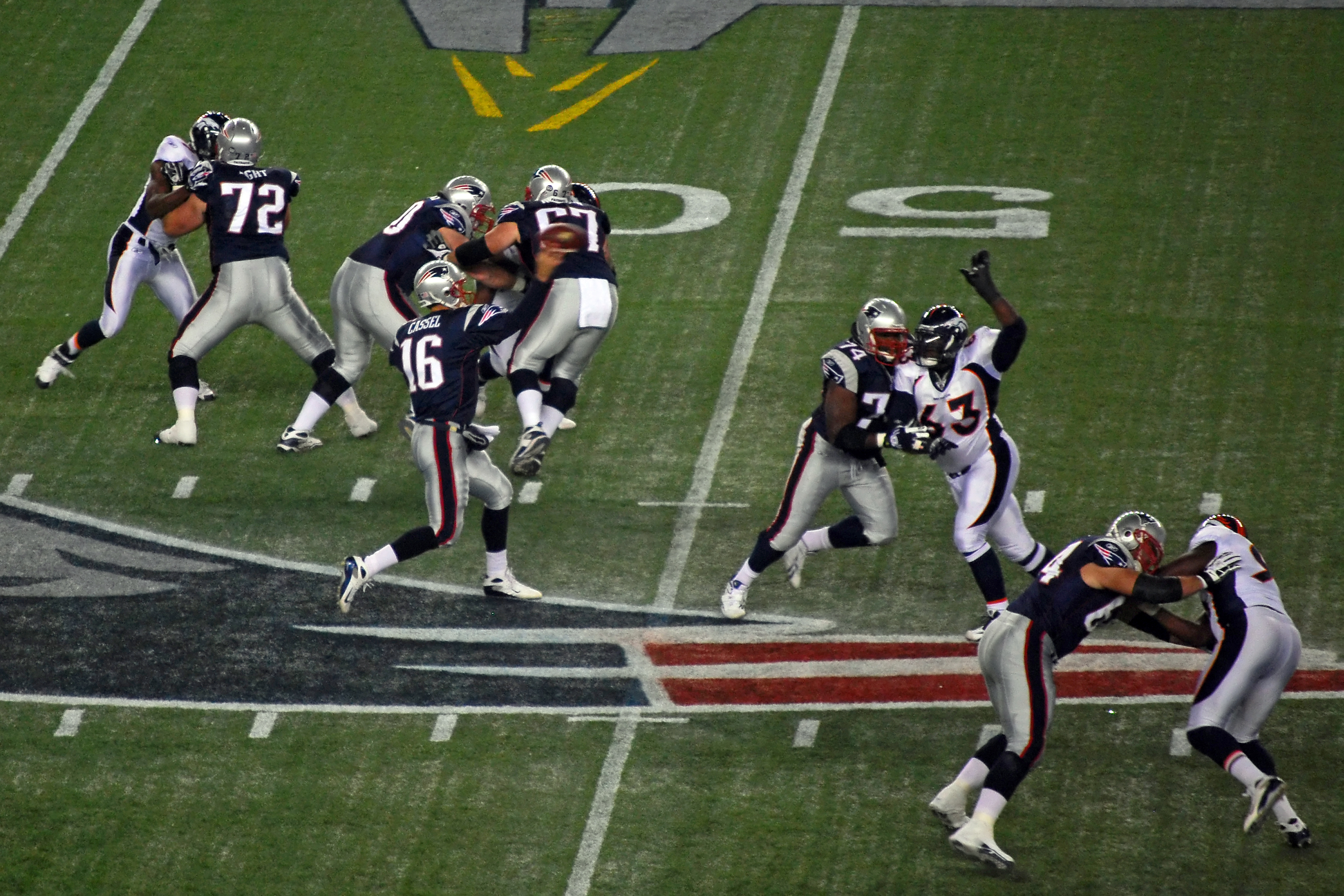
Cassel throws a pass against the Broncos.

The Patriots chose to receive the ball to open the second half. Another undrafted rookie, running back BenJarvus Green-Ellis, elevated from the Patriots' practice squad before the Chargers game, replaced Morris, who left the game with a knee injury. A Patriots punt was followed by a Broncos three-and-out; Welker returned the punt 44 yards to give the Patriots the ball at the Broncos' 28-yard line. After two Green-Ellis carries gained one yard, Cassel used a screen play to throw a 27-yard touchdown pass to Moss to extend the Patriots' lead to 27–0. Three completed passes and an unnecessary roughness penalty on Patriots nose tackle Vince Wilfork moved the Broncos' next drive into Patriots' territory before the Broncos turned the ball over for the fifth and final time, with safety James Sanders intercepting a Cutler pass; a second unnecessary roughness call, originally on Wilfork but later changed to be on Sanders, gave the Patriots the ball at their own 20-yard line to begin the ensuing drive. Three plays after a 27-yard Welker catch put the Patriots in Broncos territory, Broncos safety Calvin Lowry appeared to have intercepted an errant Cassel throw at the Broncos' 1-yard line, but, when the Patriots challenged, the pass was deemed incomplete, as the ball touched the ground before Lowry had possession. Two plays later, Welker caught his first touchdown pass of the season, this one from 6 yards out, to give the Patriots a 34–0 lead.

Four plays later, former Patriots tight end Daniel Graham caught a 10-yard touchdown pass from Cutler to cut the Patriots' lead to 34–7. The Patriots' next drive got as far as the Broncos' 33-yard line but eventually ended in a punt. The Broncos, facing 3rd-and-21 on their next drive, had a 21-yard completion by Cutler pushed back by a Broncos holding penalty; Richard Seymour sacked Cutler on the next play, forcing the Broncos to punt on 4th-and-23 with 6:35 left in the game. On the ensuing Patriots drive, two 10-yard runs by Green-Ellis and 16- and 15-yard runs by Faulk put the Patriots in the red zone, where Green-Ellis earned his first NFL touchdown, running in untouched from the 1-yard line, to score the final points of the game. Another Broncos punt gave the Patriots the ball to end the game with a 41–7 victory that took the Patriots' record to 4–2.

The Patriots accumulated 257 rushing yards, their largest total since the 1985 season. Cassel, who completed 18 of 24 passes for 185 yards, three touchdowns, and no interceptions, finished with a passer rating of 136.3, one of the ten highest single-game ratings in Patriots history, and was named AFC Offensive Player of the Week for his performance.

On the final play of the third quarter, as the Broncos were driving into Patriots territory, Harrison was injured while attempting to tackle Cutler. Harrison, whose 2005 and 2006 seasons were cut short by knee injuries that caused ligament damage, suffered a torn quadriceps muscle in his right leg. Harrison was carted off the field and placed on injured reserve two days later. Safety Antwain Spann was then activated from the practice squad. The Broncos also lost players to injury: Ramsey and linebacker Boss Bailey were also placed on injured reserve, while cornerback Champ Bailey was sidelined for several weeks by a torn groin muscle.

=== Week 8 ===
Team	1	2	3	4	Total
Rams	3	7	3	3	16
• Patriots	7	6	0	10	23

- Date: October 26
- Location: Gillette Stadium, Foxboro, MA
- Game start: 1:00 p.m. EST
- Elapsed time: 3:06
- Game attendance: 68,756
- Game weather: Sunny; 61 °F or 16.1 °C; wind 7 miles per hour (11 km/h; 6.1 kn)
- Referee: Scott Green
- TV announcers (Fox): Chris Rose, J.C. Pearson, and Nischelle Turner

Scoring summary
Q1	8:53	STL	Brown 20 yard field goal	STL 3–0
Q1	1:50	NE	Green-Ellis 2 yard run (Gostkowski kick)	NE 7–3
Q2	14:24	STL	Avery 69 yard pass from Bulger (Brown kick)	STL 10–7
Q2	1:53	NE	Gostkowski 30 yard field goal	Tie 10–10
Q2	:01	NE	Gostkowski 27 yard field goal	NE 13–10
Q3	8:08	STL	Brown 44 yard field goal	Tie 13–13
Q4	12:28	STL	Brown 25 yard field goal	STL 16–13
Q4	8:29	NE	Gostkowski 41 yard field goal	Tie 16–16
Q4	3:19	NE	Faulk 15 yard pass from Cassel (Gostkowski kick)	NE 23–16

The Patriots faced the Rams in Foxborough for the first time since the 2001 regular season, and for only the second time overall since the teams' matchup in Super Bowl XXXVI. On the opening possession, a 35-yard reception by Rams wide receiver Donnie Avery from quarterback Marc Bulger put the Rams in the Patriots' red zone, but the Rams eventually settled for a 20-yard Josh Brown field goal to take a 3–0 lead. The Patriots followed the Rams' 12-play drive with a 13-play drive of their own, ending in a 2-yard Green-Ellis touchdown run that put the Patriots ahead 7–3. On the fifth play of the Rams' ensuing possession, Bulger and Avery again connected on a pass; this one went for 69 yards and a touchdown to reestablish a Rams lead at 10–7 early in the second quarter.

The first punt of the game came on the Patriots' next drive and set the Rams up to begin their next series from their own 20-yard line. Wide receiver Keenan Burton then caught a 27-yard pass from Bulger, and Pittman ran for 30 yards on two runs to help the Rams reach as far as the Patriots' 23-yard line on a first down. A subsequent holding penalty on Rams guard Jacob Bell, plus two sacks on Bulger by the Patriots' Thomas and Seymour pushed the Rams back to the Patriots' 40-yard line, where they punted. The Patriots next drive saw Faulk replace Green-Ellis at running back as part of a predominantly shotgun offense; an 18-yard Faulk reception put the Patriots in the Rams' red zone, but the 12-play drive ended on a 30-yard Gostkowski field goal to tie the game at 10. Another sack of Bulger by Thomas, again for a loss of 13 yards, on the Rams' ensuing possession helped force the Rams to punt and to do so from their own 3-yard line. This gave the Patriots the ball at the Rams' 46-yard line with 19 seconds remaining in the half, where a 30-yard reception by Moss set up a 27-yard Gostkowski field goal to give the Patriots a 13–10 lead at the end of the half.

The Rams went three-and-out to begin the second half, setting up the Patriots to begin their next drive from their own 10-yard line. Five plays in, a Cassel pass to Moss was tipped and intercepted by Rams safety Oshiomogho Atogwe and returned to the Patriots' 43-yard line. Six plays later, the Rams tied the game at 13 on a 44-yard Brown field goal. The Patriots' next drive reached the Rams' 44-yard line, but Cassel again was intercepted, this time by cornerback Fakhir Brown after Wes Welker tripped and fell. When the Rams went three-and-out, the Patriots' next drive advanced to the Rams' 36-yard line, where Green-Ellis was denied the yard necessary for the first down on two straight plays to give the Rams the ball back on downs. A 44-yard Avery reception began the Rams' next possession, which ended seven plays later on a 25-yard Brown field goal that gave the Rams a 16–13 lead early in the fourth quarter.

An exchange of punts gave the Patriots the ball at their own 48-yard line to begin a drive that concluded with a 41-yard Gostkowski field goal to again tie the game, this time at 16. A Ty Warren sack of Bulger began the Rams' next drive, a three-and-out to give the Patriots the ball at their own 47-yard line after a punt. Cassel was sacked as well to begin the Patriots' next drive, but he hit Moss on a 23-yard completion on the very next play to put the Patriots in Rams' territory. Five plays later, Faulk was on the receiving end of a 15-yard touchdown pass by Cassel that put the Patriots ahead 23–16 with just over three minutes remaining in the game. The Rams managed to reach the Patriots' 38-yard line on the ensuing possession, but an O'Neal interception returned for 47 yards gave the Patriots the ball back and set up three Cassel kneeldowns. The Rams were then unable to score on the only play of their final series to seal a 23–16 Patriots win, one that brought the 5–2 Patriots into a tie with the Bills atop the AFC East.

For the first time in franchise history, the Patriots finished a game with zero assessed penalties; offensive tackle Matt Light was called for holding in the fourth quarter, but the penalty was declined. It was also the first penalty-free performance by any NFL team in 2008.

=== Week 9 ===
Team	1	2	3	4	Total
Patriots	0	6	6	3	15
• Colts	7	0	8	3	18

- Date: November 2
- Location: Lucas Oil Stadium, Indianapolis, IN
- Game start: 8:15 p.m. EST
- Elapsed time: 2:41
- Game attendance: 66,508
- Game weather: Partly cloudy; 62 °F or 16.7 °C
- Referee: Bill Carollo
- TV announcers (NBC): Al Michaels, John Madden, and Andrea Kremer

The Patriots traveled to Indianapolis for a Sunday night game with the Colts in Lucas Oil Stadium. Both teams went three-and-out to start the game, setting up a Colts possession that began from their own 9-yard line. The Colts then went 91 yards on a 15-play drive that lasted over nine minutes, included six first downs, and culminated in a 12-yard Anthony Gonzalez touchdown pass from Peyton Manning to give the Colts a 7–0 lead. The Patriots responded with a 13-play, 56-yard drive of their own that brought the game into the second quarter.

Part way through the drive, the Patriots employed the same "Wildcat" formation concept used against them earlier in the season against the Dolphins, using Faulk as the back receiving the direct snap on a run for five yards. The Patriots reached as far as the Colts 11-yard line but could not advance any further; a 29-yard Gostkowski field goal cut the Colts' lead to 7–3. After a Colts punt, the Patriots began their second drive of the game and were able to move the ball 61 yards on 13 plays to as far as the Colts' 17-yard line. The possession saw another use of the "Wildcat" formation; this time Faulk threw to Welker off the direct snap, but Welker then was tackled for a two-yard loss. Two plays later, Gostkowski hit a 35-yard field goal to trim the Colts' lead to 7–6. The Colts began their next drive from their own 18-yard line with one timeout and 1:22 remaining in the first half. A 26-yard Marvin Harrison reception put the Colts in Patriots territory, but Harrison was injured on the tackle and was unable to step out of bounds to stop the clock. Manning spiked the ball at the Patriots' 26-yard line with one second remaining, but was called for a false start; by rule, the penalty incurred a ten-second clock run-off to end the first half.

The Patriots' opening drive of the second half spanned 72 yards and nearly eight minutes but also ended with the Patriots having one timeout to use thereafter. On a Faulk run for no gain part way through the drive, the Patriots challenged that the Colts had too many players on the field, contending a Colts player substituting out of the game was unable to get off the field in time. The challenged failed, costing the Patriots their first timeout of the second half. Seven plays later, the Patriots used their second timeout of the half. A 6-yard Green-Ellis touchdown run put the Patriots ahead 12–7, but a two-point conversion attempt on a Faulk run kept the Patriots' lead to five points. A 39-yard Pierre Garçon return on the ensuing kickoff set up the Colts' next drive to begin from their own 43-yard line; nine plays later, Gonzalez's second touchdown reception of the night, this one from 9 yards out, put the Colts ahead 13–12. The Colts also went for the two-point conversion, and were successful, with a Reggie Wayne catch extending the Colts' lead to 15–12. The Patriots responded with a 15-play, 69-yard drive that brought the game into the fourth quarter, but one which included a dropped would-be touchdown catch by Gaffney on the penultimate play of the third quarter.

On a 3rd-and-11 from the Colts' 17-yard line, Cassel completed a pass to Welker for 10 yards; the Patriots initially brought Cassel and the offense back out onto the field for a fourth down conversion try, but Belichick decided against it and called the Patriots' final timeout of the game. A 25-yard Gostkowski field goal then tied the game at 15. Four plays into the Colts' next possession, a third down Gonzalez catch went for 24 yards and put the Colts in Patriots territory. The Colts were unable to make a first down and called upon former Patriots kicker Adam Vinatieri for a 52-yard field goal. The kick was good, and it put the Colts ahead 18–15 with just over eight minutes to play in the game. The Patriots next drive reached Colts territory on a 16-yard David Thomas catch. Two plays later, on a 2nd-and-2 from the Colts' 32-yard line, the tight end committed an unnecessary roughness penalty after a Green-Ellis run to set up a 3rd-and-16 from the Colts' 46-yard line. Faulk gained one yard on a pass from Cassel, setting up a 4th-and-15 where Cassel threw an interception to Colts safety Bob Sanders. A 14-yard Harrison catch on the Colts' next possession gave them a fresh set of downs, and the Patriots, without any timeouts, did not receive the ball again until after a Colts punt with just over 21 seconds left in the game. After two incomplete passes, Cassel completed a pass to Moss, who proceeded to fumble on a lateral attempt. The fumble was recovered by Colts cornerback Tim Jennings to end the game and bring the Patriots' record to 5–3.

=== Week 10 ===
Team	1	2	3	4	Total
Bills	0	3	0	7	10
• Patriots	7	3	3	7	20

- Date: November 9
- Location: Gillette Stadium, Foxboro, MA
- Game start: 1:00 p.m. EST
- Elapsed time: 2:42
- Game attendance: 68,756
- Game weather: Sunny; 54 °F or 12.2 °C; wind 15 miles per hour (24 km/h; 13 kn)
- Referee: Walt Coleman
- TV announcers (CBS): Dick Enberg and Randy Cross

Scoring summary
Q1	10:46	NE	Cassel 13 yard run (Gostkowski kick)	NE 7–0
Q2	13:29	NE	Gostkowski 32 yard field goal	NE 10–0
Q2	7:09	BUF	Lindell 25 yard field goal	NE 10–3
Q3	8:18	NE	Gostkowski 37 yard field goal	NE 13–3
Q4	2:00	NE	Green-Ellis 1 yard run (Gostkowski kick)	NE 20–3
Q4	1:46	BUF	Hardy 14 yard pass from Edwards (Lindell kick)	NE 20–10

In the first of three straight games against divisional opponents, the Patriots stayed at home to face the Bills, who were looking to avoid ending their own three-game divisional swing without a win. The Bills' opening drive went three-and-out, with a Seymour sack of Bills quarterback Trent Edwards setting up the punt. After a 21-yard Cassel pass put the Patriots in the Bills' red zone, a 13-yard Cassel touchdown scramble gave the Patriots a 7–0 lead. Following an exchange of punts, an errant Edwards throw was intercepted by Hobbs to begin the Patriots' next drive from the Bills' 34-yard line. Seven plays later, a 32-yard Gostkowski field goal extended the Patriots' lead to 10–0 early in the second quarter. Gostkowski's ensuing kickoff went out of bounds; the resulting illegal procedure penalty meant the Bills got the ball at their own 40-yard line. The Bills' drive reached as far as the Patriots' 4-yard line on 2nd-and-goal, but the Patriots' defense did not allow Bills running back Marshawn Lynch any positive yardage on two straight runs. A 25-yard Rian Lindell field goal then cut the Patriots' lead to 10–3. The Patriots' ensuing drive began with a 27-yard Welker reception but could not advance pass the Bills' 31-yard line; a 49-yard Gostkowski field goal attempt was no good. A Bills punt on their next drive gave the Patriots the ball at their own 3-yard line, where the Patriots ran out the clock to end the first half.

On the third play of the second half, Welker's six catch of the game made him the first player in NFL history to record six catches in the first nine games of a season. The ensuing 13-play drive culminated with a 37-yard Gostkowski field goal that gave the Patriots a 13–3 lead. An exchange of punts gave the Bills the ball at their own 19-yard line to begin their next drive, which advanced to the Bills' 45-yard line before Edwards' second interception of the day, this one to O'Neal, gave the Patriots the ball back at their own 41-yard line for the final play of the fourth quarter. Five plays later, Cassel was sacked for the only time in the game at the Bills' 44-yard line by defensive tackle Marcus Stroud and safety George Wilson; Stroud forced a fumble in the process and Wilson recovered it at the spot of the sack. The Bills' next drive ended in a Brian Moorman punt that the Patriots the ball at their own 8-yard line with just over 11 minutes remaining in the game. The Patriots then embarked on a 19-play, 92-yard drive that tied a franchise record set in 2002 for number of plays in a single drive; it was also the Patriots' NFL-leading 22nd drive of ten or more plays. It ended with a 1-yard Green-Ellis touchdown run that extended the Patriots' lead to 20–3 with 1:57 remaining in the game. The Bills responded on the ensuing kickoff with an 85-yard return by Leodis McKelvin, setting up a 14-yard touchdown catch by fellow rookie James Hardy on the next play to cut the Patriots' lead to 20–10. The Bills then attempted an onside kick, which appeared to be recovered by the Bills but was then ruled to be dead at the spot as it had been touched by a Bills player before traveling the necessary 10 yards. Three kneeldowns by the Patriots gave them a 20–10 win to better their record to 6–3.

=== Week 11 ===
Team	1	2	3	4	OT	Total
• Jets	10	14	0	7	3	34
Patriots	3	10	8	10	0	31

- Date: November 13
- Location: Gillette Stadium, Foxboro, MA
- Game start: 8:15 p.m. EST
- Elapsed time: 3:29
- Game attendance: 68,756
- Game weather: Cloudy; 44 °F or 6.7 °C; wind 6 miles per hour (9.7 km/h; 5.2 kn)
- Referee: Gene Steratore
- TV announcers (NFLN): Bob Papa, Cris Collinsworth, and Adam Schefter

Looking for a split in their season series with the Patriots and a lead in the AFC East, the Jets traveled to Foxboro to face the Patriots on a Thursday night. The Jets' Leon Washington returned the opening kickoff 30 yards to start the Jets' first drive from their own 38-yard line. Four plays in, an incompletion from Jets quarterback Brett Favre to Coles appeared to set up a fourth down, but the Jets challenged the play and won; the catch gave the Jets a first down from the Patriots' 37-yard line. Shortly after a 20-yard Dustin Keller catch extended the Jets' drive on third down again, a 7-yard Washington touchdown run gave the Jets a 7–0 lead. The Patriots responded by moving into Jets' territory on their first drive, but were later forced to settle for a 42-yard Gostkowski field goal that cut the Jets' lead to 7–3. Washington returned the ensuing kickoff 37 yards to give the Jets the ball at their own 36-yard line for the beginning of their next possession. Another Keller catch on third down put the Jets into Patriots territory; a Pierre Woods unnecessary roughness penalty moved the Patriots defense back further, eventually to their own 5-yard line on a Jets first down. However, the Jets managed to move the ball only one more yard, leading to a 22-yard Feely field goal that extended the Jets' lead to 10–3 at the end of the first quarter.

The Patriots' second drive of the game went for 59 yards on 12 plays, but a Morris run for no gain and two incompletions from the Jets' 13-yard line set up a 31-yard Gostkowski field to trim the Jets' lead to 10–6. Taking the ensuing kickoff from the Jets' 8-yard line, Washington went 92 yards for the touchdown, opening the Jets' lead to 17–6. The Patriots punted on their next possession, giving the Jets the ball at their own 13-yard line. Favre began the drive with an 18-yard pass to wide receiver Jerricho Cotchery, and then two plays later, a 46-yard Cotchery catch put the Jets on the Patriots' 16-yard line; Favre hit Cotchery yet again two plays later, this time for a 15-yard touchdown reception that gave the Jets a 24–6 lead. On the Patriots' next possession, a 43-yard Sam Aiken catch on a screen pass put the Patriots in Jets territory; a 9-yard Cassel scramble set up 3rd-and-1. A Heath Evans run was stopped for a loss of two yards, and Cassel was sacked by C. J. Mosley on fourth down to turn the ball over on downs for the Patriots at the Jets' 30-yard line. The Jets then went three-and-out for the first time in the game, giving the Patriots, with one timeout remaining, the ball at their own 32-yard line with 1:44 remaining in the first half. The Patriots did not call their final timeout until multiple completed Cassel passes, a 19-yard scramble, and a successful quarterback sneak to convert on fourth down gave the Patriots the ball at the Jets' 19-yard line with 31 seconds left in the first half. After two incomplete passes, Cassel threw a 19-yard touchdown pass to Gaffney to cut the Jets' lead to 24–13 heading into halftime.

Having the ball to start the second half, the Patriots moved to the Jets' 34-yard line on four plays, but on a subsequent 12-yard Watson reception, the tight end fumbled as he was being tackled by linebacker Eric Barton; the loose ball was recovered by safety Kerry Rhodes and returned 11 yards to the Jets' 33-yard line. However, two sacks of Favre by Wilfork and Seymour, both for losses of nine yards, forced the Jets into their second three-and-out series of the night. Cassel was sacked on the next play, but four plays later, the Patriots had a first down from the Jets' 38-yard line. Patriots center Dan Koppen, who had left the game with an injury in the second quarter but later returned, snapped the ball while Cassel was making adjustments at the line and was not ready to receive the snap. Cassel chased the Koppen fumble and recovered it at the Patriots' 38-yard line for a loss of 24 yards. The Patriots, later facing 4th-and-21, punted to give the Jets the ball at their own 16-yard line. A Jets punt was followed by an exchange of three-and-outs, eventually setting up a Patriots drive to begin from their own 22-yard line. A 29-yard Welker reception put the Patriots in Jets territory; five plays later, Watson caught a 10-yard touchdown pass, his first of the year, cutting the Jets' lead to 24–19. On the final snap of the third quarter, the Patriots attempted a two-point conversion and succeeded; the Gaffney catch put the Patriots to within a field goal, trailing 24–21.

Five plays into the Jets' next drive, Patriots cornerback Jason Webster forced Cotchery to fumble a 9-yard reception; Guyton recovered the fumble at the Patriots' 40-yard line. The Patriots next possession featured an entirely shotgun, no-huddle offense, with a 17-yard Cassel scramble moving the Patriots back into Jets territory. Four plays later, a 47-yard Gostkowski field goal tied the game. Starting from their own 33-yard line after the Patriots directed the kickoff to linebacker David Bowens instead of to Washington, the Jets began what would be a 14-play drive with just over 10 minutes left in the game. The Jets then moved the ball to the Patriots' 7-yard line to set up a 3rd-and-7 with 3:38 left in the game. Favre's pass intended to Cotchery fell incomplete, but Patriots linebacker Mike Vrabel was called for a defensive holding penalty, giving the Jets an automatic first down from the Patriots' 3-yard line. The Jets failed to score on two straight runs, while the Patriots used two timeouts to stop the clock after each play. On the third rushing attempt, Thomas Jones scored from a yard out to give the Jets a 31–24 lead with 3:10 left in the game. Cassel was sacked on second down of the Patriots' next drive, forcing them to punt on three-and-out but not having to use their timeout until the Jets' next possession, when they used it in conjunction with the two-minute warning to get the ball back with 1:04 left in the game after a Jets punt. Starting from their own 38-yard line, the Patriots moved to the Jets' 42-yard line on two Cassel completions; a spike stopped the clock at :36. A 17-yard Welker catch and another spike then put the Patriots at the Jets' 25-yard line with :23 left. A Koppen false start moved the Patriots back 5 yards, but a 14-yard Welker catch and another spike put the Patriots on the Jets' 16-yard line with 8 seconds to go. On the ensuing play, Moss was covered by former Patriots cornerback Ty Law, who returned to the Jets for a second stint with the team just days earlier after sitting out the first 10 weeks of the season. As Cassel eluded a pass rusher and moved into the flat, Moss looked for the pass from the near corner of the end zone. Cassel threw to Moss, who caught the pass just beyond the near pylon and fell out of bounds, giving the Patriots a 16-yard touchdown with 1 second remaining in the game. A booth review was called but determined Moss did indeed have possession and the necessary footing before he fell out of bounds, upholding the touchdown call and sending the game into overtime after the extra point.

Even though the Patriots had won their last eight overtime games, they began the sudden death period on defense as the Jets won the overtime coin toss. On the first play of the Jets' possession, Favre was sacked for a loss of five yards; an incomplete pass set up a 3rd-and-15 from the Jets' 15-yard line. However, Favre found Keller for a 16-yard catch and the first down; and then did so again two plays later, this one for 12 yards to move the Jets to their own 47-yard line. Three plays later, on a 3rd-and-1 from the Patriots' 44-yard line, Keller caught his third first down catch of the drive. This was followed by a 16-yard Coles catch two plays later, giving the Jets a first down from the Patriots' 24-yard line. On 4th-and-2 from the Patriots' 16-yard line, Feely hit a 34-yard field goal to give the Jets a 34–31 overtime win, dropping the Patriots to second in the division with a 6–4 record.

The Patriots' total of 511 net yards in the game was the fourth-best in franchise history, and the highest since 1979. Cassel's 62 rushing yards were the most by a Patriots quarterback since Steve Grogan had 68 yards in 1978. Moreover, Cassel's 400 passing yards and 62 rushing yards made him the first player since the AFL-NFL merger in 1970 to have at least 400 passing and 60 rushing yards in a single game, and the first Patriots quarterback to throw for 300 yards and rush for 50 in the same game.

=== Week 12 ===
Team	1	2	3	4	Total
• Patriots	3	14	14	17	48
Dolphins	7	7	7	7	28

- Date: November 23
- Location: Dolphin Stadium, Miami, FL
- Game start: 1:00 p.m. EST
- Elapsed time: 3:21
- Game attendance: 67,146
- Game weather: Partly cloudy; 73 °F or 22.8 °C; wind 14 miles per hour (23 km/h; 12 kn)
- Referee: Alberto Riveron
- TV announcers (CBS): Greg Gumbel and Dan Dierdorf

Scoring summary
Q1	10:13	NE	Gostkowski 30 yard field goal	NE 3–0
Q1	5:29	MIA	Camarillo 3 yard pass from Pennington (Carpenter kick)	MIA 7–3
Q2	15:00	NE	Cassel 8 yard run (Gostkowski kick)	NE 10–7
Q2	5:16	MIA	Pennington 7 yard run (Carpenter kick)	MIA 14–10
Q2	2:24	NE	Moss 25 yard pass from Cassel (Gostkowski kick)	NE 17–14
Q3	11:35	MIA	Cramer 2 yard pass from Pennington (Carpenter kick)	MIA 21–17
Q3	6:19	NE	Moss 8 yard pass from Cassel (Gostkowski kick)	NE 24–21
Q3	:08	NE	Faulk 21 yard run (Gostkowski kick)	NE 31–21
Q4	13:19	MIA	Williams 13 yard pass from Pennington (Carpenter kick)	NE 31–28
Q4	8:59	NE	Moss 29 yard pass from Cassel (Gostkowski kick)	NE 38–28
Q4	7:12	NE	Gostkowski 30 yard field goal	NE 41–28
Q4	:40	NE	Green-Ellis 1 yard run (Gostkowski kick)	NE 48–28

Looking to avoid back-to-back divisional losses, the Patriots traveled to Miami to face the 6–4 Dolphins at Dolphin Stadium. After Carpenter's kickoff was returned from the 29-yard line by Matthew Slater, the Patriots began their first possession at their own 40-yard line. Cassel's first two passes were both completed for first downs, putting the Patriots in Dolphins territory and eventually their red zone. However, a holding penalty on Neal pushed the Patriots back 10 yards, forcing a 30-yard Gostkowski field goal four plays later that gave the Patriots a 3–0 lead. Following a Dolphins three-and-out, the Patriots' second drive ended when a Cassel pass to Moss was bobbled by both Moss and cornerback Jason Allen to keep the ball in the air until Renaldo Hill intercepted it; a 17-yard return gave the Dolphins the ball at the Patriots' 42-yard line. On the next play, a 29-yard David Martin reception moved the Dolphins into the Patriots' red zone, where the Dolphins used their "Wildcat" formation on the next two plays. A Tedy Bruschi unnecessary roughness penalty on the second Ronnie Brown run set up a first-and-goal, where Camarillo caught a 3-yard pass from Pennington for a touchdown, giving the Dolphins a 7–3 lead. The Patriots responded with a 12-play, 74-yard drive that ended on the first play of the second quarter, an 8-yard touchdown scramble by Cassel to give the Patriots the lead again, 10–7.

The Dolphins' next drive went three-and-out despite two more plays using the "Wildcat" formation, giving the Patriots the ball at their own 41-yard line. On a 1-yard Morris run from the Dolphins' 28-yard line, linebacker Matt Roth forced a fumble during the tackle; the ball was recovered by Dolphins cornerback André Goodman at the Dolphins' 28-yard line. The Dolphins took advantage of the turnover, going 72 yards on 12 plays and re-taking the lead at 14–10 on a 7-yard Pennington touchdown scramble. Carpenter's ensuing kickoff was returned by Slater from the Patriots' 24-yard line, setting up the Patriots' next drive to begin from their own 37-yard line. Six plays later, Cassel completed a 25-yard touchdown pass to Moss that gave the Patriots the lead again, 17–14. After an exchange of three-and-outs, the Dolphins began their final drive of the half with 39 seconds remaining and moved into Patriots territory. However, a false start on wide receiver Ted Ginn Jr. followed by a Vrabel sack of Pennington ended the first half.

Due to their deferral of the opening kickoff, the Dolphins elected to receive the opening kickoff of the second half. A 46-yard Pennington pass to Ginn on the first play moved the Dolphins to the Patriots' 36-yard line; six plays later, Pennington hit fullback Casey Cramer on a 2-yard touchdown catch that gave the Dolphins the lead again at 21–17. The Patriots responded by going 78 yards on 11 plays, re-taking the lead yet again on the second Moss touchdown catch of the day; the 8-yard grab put the Patriots ahead 24–21. The Dolphins' next drive got as far as the Patriots' 27-yard line, but an offensive holding penalty, incomplete pass, and sack forced the Dolphins to punt from the Patriots' 42-yard line. Two plays later, Cassel completed a pass to Welker across the middle; the wide receiver ran along the sideline after the catch to pick up 64 yards on the play. After an incomplete pass to Moss, a 21-yard Faulk touchdown run extended the Patriots' lead to 31–21 on the final play of the third quarter.

Four plays into the Dolphins' ensuing drive, on 3rd-and-3, Pennington hit wide receiver Davone Bess for a 36-yard gain to put the Dolphins in the Patriots' red zone. On the next play, a diving Ricky Williams 13-yard touchdown catch cut the Patriots' lead to 31–28. Facing a 3rd-and-10 from their own 42-yard line during their next drive, the Patriots moved into Dolphins territory on a 23-yard Gaffney catch. Two plays later, Cassel and Moss connected for their third touchdown pass of the day, this one from 29 yards out, to give the Patriots a 38–28 lead. On the next play, Meriweather intercepted a Pennington pass and returned it 19 yards to the Dolphins' 18-yard line. However, safety Yeremiah Bell sacked Cassel on 3rd-and-2 to set up a 30-yard Gostkowski field goal that extended the Patriots lead to 41–28 with just over seven minutes remaining in the game. Starting from their own 1-yard after a Ginn kick return for a loss and a holding penalty, the Dolphins moved the ball as far as their 44-yard line on 10 plays, but could not successfully convert on fourth down to turn the ball back over to the Patriots. The Patriots, with just four minutes remaining in the game, exclusively ran Green-Ellis running plays on their ensuing possession, moving into the Dolphins' red zone on back-to-back unnecessary roughness and unsportsmanlike conduct penalties by Porter. On the six play of the drive, a fourth down, Green-Ellis ran for a 1-yard touchdown to give the Patriots a 48–28 lead. Down by 20 points, the Dolphins ran one play in the remaining 37 seconds to end the game and improve the Patriots' record to 7–4.

The Patriots' 530 net yards of offense were the second highest output in team history, behind the Patriots' 597 yards in 1979. Cassel's 415 passing yards made him the second quarterback in Patriots history to throw for at least 400 yards in two or more games; Drew Bledsoe had four 400+ yard passing games in his Patriots career.

=== Week 13 ===
Team	1	2	3	4	Total
• Steelers	3	7	13	10	33
Patriots	7	3	0	0	10

- Date: November 30
- Location: Gillette Stadium, Foxboro, MA
- Game start: 4:15 p.m. EST
- Elapsed time: 3:07
- Game attendance: 68,756
- Game weather: Rain; 34 °F or 1.1 °C; wind 3 miles per hour (4.8 km/h; 2.6 kn)
- Referee: Ed Hochuli
- TV announcers (CBS): Greg Gumbel and Dan Dierdorf

After their road win in Miami, the Patriots returned home to face the Steelers, who the Patriots had not lost to since 2004. On the opening kickoff, Patriots linebacker Vince Redd forced a fumble of Carey Davis at the Steelers' 20-yard line that Davis eventually recovered; an unnecessary roughness penalty by the Steelers' Keyaron Fox meant the Steelers would begin their first drive from their own 10-yard line. Four plays in, Vrabel intercepted Steelers quarterback Ben Roethlisberger and returned it 5 yards to give the Patriots the ball at the Steelers' 14-yard line. After a Welker reception moved the ball to the Steelers' 2-yard line, Morris ran in for a 2-yard touchdown to give the Patriots a 7–0 lead. The Steelers' ensuing possession went three-and-out, but a holding penalty by Aiken on the punt moved the Patriots back to the Steelers' 20-yard line. A 27-yard Moss catch on the next play would help the Patriots reach midfield, but a third-down sack of Cassel set up a Patriots punt, which was returned by the Steelers' Santonio Holmes for 29 yards. Following a 21-yard reception by tight end Heath Miller to begin the drive, the Steelers moved further into Patriots territory on two Nate Washington catches of 15 and 16 yards, both on third down. The Steelers then failed to score from the Patriots' 2-yard line on third down, setting up a 20-yard Jeff Reed field goal to cut the Patriots' lead to 7–3. Three plays into the Patriots' next drive, Moss dropped a pass after he beat his defender inside the Steelers' 35-yard line, eventually setting up another Patriots punt on the final play of the quarter.

An exchange of three three-and-outs began the second quarter, leading to Patriots drive that began from their own 40-yard line. A fourth down conversion put the Patriots in the Steelers' red zone, but the Patriots were unable to reach the end zone and settled for a 29-yard Gostkowski field goal that extended their lead to 10–3. Following a 31-yard Gary Russell kick return that gave the Steelers the ball at their own 37-yard line, the Steelers moved 63 yards on 9 plays, capping their drive with a 19-yard Holmes touchdown catch to tie the game at 10 with just under two minutes left in the half. Two plays later, the Patriots found themselves in Steelers' territory again following a 41-yard Faulk run; 35 seconds remained in the first half by the time the Patriots reached the Steelers' 9-yard line on a first down. The Patriots' next three plays would be Cassel pass attempts to Moss; the second of which was dropped by a leaping Moss in the back of the end zone. On fourth down, Gostkowski's 27-yard field goal attempt was no good to keep the game tied at 10 going into halftime.

Following a 23-yard defensive pass interference penalty on Steelers cornerback Ike Taylor to begin the second half, the Patriots moved into Steelers' territory, but another sack of Cassel forced a Patriots punt. Starting from their own 14-yard line, the Steelers responded by embarking on a 14-play, 79-drive that reached the Patriots' 7-yard line on a second down but no further; a 25-yard Reed field goal gave the Steelers their first lead of the game, 13–10. With Hobbs, the usual kick returner, on the sidelines vomiting and suffering from cramps, Slater took the ensuing kickoff; the rookie muffed the catch and the fumble was recovered by Fox at the Patriots' 8-yard line. Two plays later, Roethlisberger hit wide receiver Hines Ward for an 11-yard touchdown reception to extend the Steelers' lead to 20–10. Faulk stepped in as kick returner for the next kickoff, which he returned to the Patriots' 29-yard line. However, on the next play, Cassel was strip-sacked by Steelers linebacker James Harrison; the fumble was recovered by linebacker LaMarr Woodley at the Patriots' 26-yard line. Despite a 19-yard Miller catch to begin the Steelers' possession, the Patriots forced the Steelers to kick a field goal; Reed's 20-yard kick gave the Steelers a 23–10 lead. Hobbs came back to return the next kickoff, which began the Patriots' drive from their own 35-yard line. Three plays in, Welker was hit from behind by Steelers safety Ryan Clark after a Cassel pass attempt was tipped; Clark was called for a 15-yard unnecessary roughness penalty to move the Patriots in Steelers' territory. On 3rd-and-11 from the Steelers' 48-yard line, Cassel was again strip-sacked by Harrison; this time linebacker James Farrior recovered the fumble at the Patriots' 47-yard line.

The Steelers next drive began on the final play of the third quarter and reached as far as the Patriots' 22-yard line, where Reed missed a 40-yard field goal to give the Patriots the ball back at their own 30-yard line. The Patriots proceeded to move into Steelers' territory, but on 3rd-and-13 from the Steelers' 43-yard line, a Cassel pass intended for Watson was intercepted by safety Troy Polamalu at the Steelers' 11-yard line and returned for 23 yards in the Patriots' fourth turnover of the second half. Three plays later, a 31-yard Willie Parker moved the Steelers to the Patriots' 28-yard line; they would get as far as the Patriots' 22-yard line before Reed kicked a 45-yard field goal to extend the Steelers' lead to 26–10. With less than six minutes remaining in the game, the Patriots began their next series from their own 44-yard line after Reed's kick was returned from the Patriots' 30-yard line. On the first play of the drive, Cassel found Gaffney open inside the Steelers' 25-yard line, but the wide receiver dropped the pass; Taylor threw the ball back toward Gaffney after the play, drawing a 15-yard unsportsmanlike conduct penalty that moved the Patriots into Steelers' territory. Seven plays later, on a first down from the Steelers' 14-yard line, Cassel was intercepted by linebacker Lawrence Timmons, who returned it 89 yards before being tackled at the Patriots' 1-yard line by Watson. Two plays later, Russell ran in for a 1-yard touchdown that gave the Steelers a 33–10 lead with less than three minutes to go in the game. The Patriots could not score on their next possession, ending the game and dropping the Patriots' record to 7–5. This would the Patriots last home loss to the Steelers until 2025.

=== Week 14 ===
Team	1	2	3	4	Total
• Patriots	3	7	3	11	24
Seahawks	7	7	7	0	21

- Date: December 7
- Location: Qwest Field, Seattle, WA
- Game start: 4:05 p.m. EST
- Elapsed time: 2:57
- Game attendance: 68,077
- Game weather: Cloudy; 50 °F or 10 °C; wind 3 miles per hour (4.8 km/h; 2.6 kn)
- Referee: Carl Cheffers
- TV announcers (CBS): Dick Enberg and Randy Cross

Scoring summary
Q1	5:32	SEA	Branch 14 yard pass from Wallace (Mare kick)	SEA 7–0
Q1	:53	NE	Gostkowski 50 yard field goal	SEA 7–3
Q2	12:36	SEA	Carlson 10 yard pass from Wallace (Mare kick)	SEA 14–3
Q2	9:14	NE	Watson 2 yard pass from Cassel (Gostkowski kick)	SEA 14–10
Q3	2:45	NE	Gostkowski 42 yard field goal	SEA 14–13
Q3	:49	SEA	Branch 4 yard pass from Wallace (Mare kick)	SEA 21–13
Q4	12:22	NE	Gostkowski 27 yard field goal	SEA 21–16
Q4	2:50	NE	Morris 1 yard run (Welker pass from Cassel)	NE 24–21

Beginning a two-game West Coast swing, the Patriots faced the Seahawks in Seattle for the first time since 1993. The Patriots received the opening kickoff but were later forced to punt. Starting from their own 13-yard line, the Seahawks went 87 yards on 13 plays and took the lead on a 14-yard touchdown catch by former Patriots wide receiver Deion Branch from quarterback Seneca Wallace, starting in place of Matt Hasselbeck. A 20-yard third down catch by Welker put the Patriots into Seahawks territory on their next drive, which eventually ended in a 50-yard Gostkowski field goal that cut the Seahawks' lead to 7–3. Early in the second quarter, the Seahawks moved to the Patriots' 21-yard line on a 25-yard catch by tight end John Carlson; two plays later, Carlson caught a 10-yard touchdown pass from Wallace to extend the Seahaks' lead to 14–3. Hobbs returned the ensuing kickoff 55 yards to set the Patriots' next drive up to begin from the Seahawks' 43-yard line. Running back LaMont Jordan, playing in his first game for the Patriots since Week 5 due to an injury, fumbled a second down run but recovered his own fumble; a Cassel ran for a first down on the next play to extend the drive. Two plays later, a defensive pass interference penalty on Seahawks cornerback Marcus Trufant on a pass intended for Moss gave the Patriots a first down from the Seahawks' 2-yard line. Watson then caught a 2-yard touchdown pass from Cassel to cut the Seahawks' lead to 14–10, but his post-touchdown celebration involved using the ball as a prop, prompting a 15-yard unsportsmanlike conduct penalty. The Seahawks began their next drive from their own 40-yard line but were forced to punt, giving the Patriots the ball at their own 10-yard line. The Patriots managed to reach midfield, but a third down sack of Cassel by defensive end Baraka Atkins led to a Patriots punt. The Seahawks then went three-and-out, giving the Patriots the ball to end the first half.

After deferring the opening coin toss, the Seahawks chose to receive the ball to begin the second half. Their resulting drive reached the Patriots 44-yard line but no further, giving the Patriots the ball at their own 18-yard line following the punt. After an exchange of three-and-outs, the Patriots began their next drive a yard better, from their own 19-yard line. A 17-yard Welker reception on third down brought the Patriots to midfield, and a 12-yard Welker catch three plays later again extended the Patriots drive. However, the Patriots could not move past the Seahawks' 25-yard line; a 42-yard Gostkowski field goal cut the Seahawks' lead down to 14–13. The ensuing kickoff was fumbled by Josh Wilson after a 26-yard return, but it was recovered by Seahawks linebacker Will Herring at the Seahawks' 38-yard line for no gain. After an offensive holding penalty, Wallace connected with Branch on a sideline pass; Branch proceeded to go 63 yards before being pushed out of bounds at the Patriots' 9-yard line. The catch was challenged by Belichick, who argued Branch's foot was out of bounds as he made the catch, but the ruling was upheld. Two plays later, Branch caught his second touchdown of the day, this one a 4-yard one-handed grab, to give increase the Seahawks' lead to 21–13. The Patriots next drive faced a 3rd and 10 after two plays, but on the final play of the third quarter, a 28-yard Gaffney catch put the Patriots in Seahawks territory.

After another two plays, the Patriots again found themselves in a third down situation; this time Moss caught a 33-yard pass from Cassel to put the Patriots on the Seahawks' 13-yard line. However, the Patriots could not convert another third down, and Gostkowski was called on to kick a 27-yard field goal that cut the Seahawks' lead to 21–16. The Patriots defense, playing without Warren, who was inactive for the game, as well as starters Bruschi, James Sanders, and Wilfork, who were all injured in the first half, forced the Seahawks to punt on their next drive, giving the Patriots the ball at their own 29-yard line with less than nine minutes remaining in the game. Three consecutive third down conversions – an 11-yard Faulk catch, a five-yard Gaffney catch, and a 13-yard Welker catch – extended the Patriots drive and moved them to the Seahawks' 31-yard line. On first down, a 25-yard Welker screen pass put the Patriots in the Seahawks' red zone, but on third down, Morris was unable to score on a run for the 1-yard line, setting up fourth down. This time, Morris' dive was successful, giving the Patriots a 22–21 lead. The Patriots converted their two-point conversion try with a Welker catch, increasing their lead to 24–21. However, a 26-yard Wilson kickoff return followed by a 23-yard Wallace scramble put the Seahawks on the Patriots' 43-yard line just before the two-minute warning. After a Maurice Morris run for a loss of a yard, Wallace was strip-sacked by a blitzing Meriweather on 2nd and 11; Seymour recovered the fumble at the Seahawks' 49-yard line to seal the Patriots win. Their 8–5 record brought them into a three-way tie with the Dolphins and Jets for first place in the division.

=== Week 15 ===
Team	1	2	3	4	Total
• Patriots	21	14	7	7	49
Raiders	7	7	6	6	26

- Date: December 14
- Location: Oakland–Alameda County Coliseum, Oakland, CA
- Game start: 4:15 p.m. EST
- Elapsed time: 3:10
- Game attendance: 62,179
- Game weather: Overcast; 44 °F or 6.7 °C; wind 15 miles per hour (24 km/h; 13 kn)
- Referee: John Parry
- TV announcers (CBS): Kevin Harlan and Rich Gannon

Scoring summary
Q1	10:29	NE	Faulk 7 yard pass from Cassel (Gostkowski kick)	NE 7–0
Q1	8:05	NE	Moss 20 yard pass from Cassel (Gostkowski kick)	NE 14–0
Q1	3:50	NE	Morris 29 yard run (Gostkowski kick)	NE 21–0
Q1	1:47	OAK	Higgins 56 yard pass from Russell (Janikowski kick)	NE 21–7
Q2	13:19	NE	Welker 13 yard pass from Cassel (Gostkowski kick)	NE 28–7
Q2	13:12	OAK	Miller 91 yard kickoff return (Janikowski kick)	NE 28–14
Q2	2:59	NE	Hobbs 95 yard kickoff return (Gostkowski kick)	NE 35–14
Q3	11:42	NE	Moss 9 yard pass from Cassel (Gostkowski kick)	NE 42–14
Q3	5:07	OAK	Curry 10 yard pass from Russell (kick failed)	NE 42–20
Q4	6:19	NE	Jordan 49 yard run (Gostkowski kick)	NE 49–20
Q4	1:59	OAK	McFadden 11 yard run (pass failed)	NE 49–26

In the second game of a West Coast series, the Patriots again practiced at San José State University in preparation for their game against the Raiders. On the Raiders' first drive, a 43-yard three-and-out punt was returned 14 yards by Faulk to the Raiders' 40-yard line. The Patriots then moved into the Raiders' red zone with two third-down conversions, both Welker receptions, but the ensuing second down, the Patriots were docked a timeout after losing a challenge that the Raiders had too many players on the field. On the next play, Faulk caught a 7-yard touchdown pass from Cassel to give the Patriots a 7–0 lead. Starting from within their 20-yard line for the second straight possession, the Raiders faced another three-and-out after a third down Vrabel strip-sack of quarterback JaMarcus Russell that was recovered by Raiders tight end Zach Miller. Punter Shane Lechler's next punt traveled 18 yards, giving the Patriots the ball at the Raiders' 35-yard line. Three plays later, Cassel connected with Moss on a 20-yard touchdown pass to extend the Patriots' lead to 14–0. After yet another Raiders three-and-out, Lechler punted 62 yards to the Patriots' 5-yard line, marking the first time in the game the Patriots would run a play from scrimmage in their own territory. This play would be a 14-yard Cassel run; a third-down Faulk catch then extended the drive, and the Patriots moved into Raiders territory on another Cassel scramble coupled with a Raiders holding penalty. Four plays later, a 29-yard Morris touchdown run gave the Patriots a 21–0 lead. However, one play after converting their initial first down of the game, the Raiders cut the Patriots' lead to 21–7 on a 56-yard touchdown catch by Johnnie Lee Higgins from Russell.

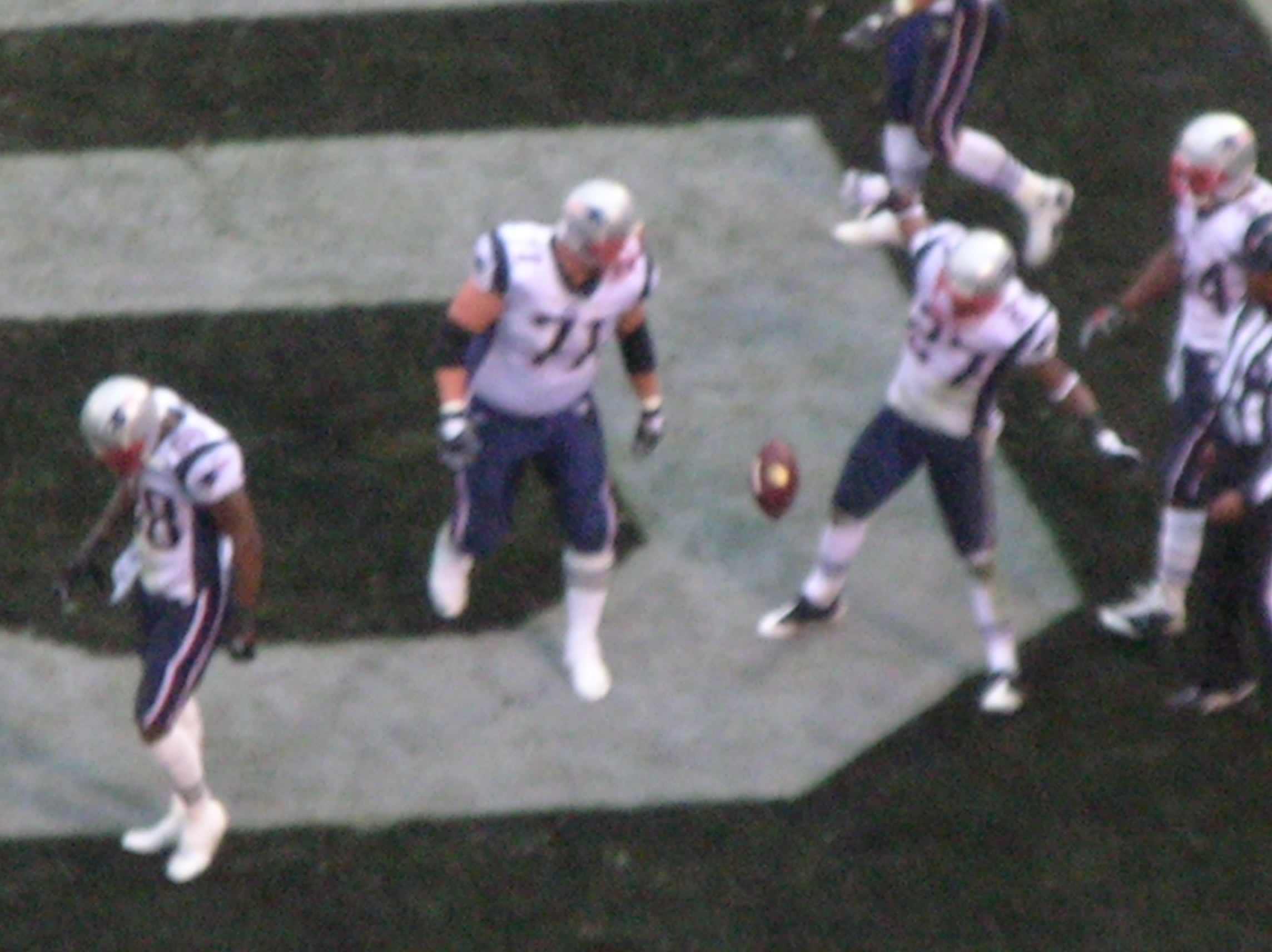
Hobbs (right) celebrates his kickoff return for a touchdown.

The Patriots next drive spanned into the second quarter. A 30-yard Welker reception put the Patriots in the Raiders' red zone; two plays later, Cassel hit Welker on a 13-yard touchdown catch to bring the Patriots' lead to 28–7. The catch was Welker's 100th of the season, making him the eighth player in NFL history to record back-to-back 100-catch seasons. However, Justin Miller returned the ensuing kickoff 91 yards for a touchdown, cutting the Patriots lead to 28–14. Hobbs responded by returning the very next kickoff 95 yards for a touchdown of his own, increasing the Patriots' advantage to 21 points, 35–14. The Raiders could not advance past their own 38-yard line on their next drive and Lechler punted to the Patriots' 20-yard line. The Patriots eventually reached the Raiders' 43-yard line on 3rd-and-2, but Cassel was intercepted by safety Gibril Wilson at the Raiders' 21-yard line; Wilson returned the interception 5 yards. Four plays into their ensuing possession the Raiders reached Patriots territory for the first time in the game on a 23-yard catch by Miller. However, two plays later, Russell was intercepted by Patriots cornerback Jonathan Wilhite at the Patriots' 1-yard line; a 16-yard return brought the Patriots to their 17-yard line. With just under three minutes left in the half, the Patriots moved into Raiders territory with help from a 23-yard Faulk run and a 19-yard Faulk catch. However, Cassel was sacked on a 1st-and-10 from the Raiders' 13-yard line, and without any timeouts, Cassel was forced to spike the ball with 29 seconds left. On the spike, the Patriots were called for an illegal shift after Gaffney was not set at the snap; a 10-second clock run-off ensued, and the Patriots were unable to get a field goal snap off in time before the end of the half.

Receiving the kickoff to begin the second half, the Patriots moved into the Raiders' red zone on a 35-yard Morris run. Three plays later, Moss caught a 9-yard touchdown pass from Cassel to increase the Patriots' lead to 42–14. Raiders running back Darren McFadden responded with a 29-yard rush on the next play, bringing the Raiders to midfield. After two plays for no gain, Russell was strip-sacked on third down by Wright for a loss of 15 yards; Russell recovered his own fumble at the Raiders' 34-yard line to set up a 66-yard Lechler punt. Despite gaining a first down, the Patriots were forced to punt for the first time in the game following a sack of Cassel on third down. A 43-yard punt and a penalty on Mayo meant the Raiders began their next drive from their own 46-yard line. The Raiders next three plays all went for first downs, including a 24-yard McFadden run to begin the drive. On the fifth play of the drive, Russell connected with wide receiver Ronald Curry on a 10-yard touchdown pass that cut the Patriots' lead to 42–20 after Wilfork blocked Sebastian Janikowski's extra point. The Patriots' next drive ended in a three-and-out punt that put the Raiders on their own 12-yard line. A 17-yard McFadden run began the drive, but the Raiders were unable to reach Patriots territory and punted from their own 48-yard line.

Early in the fourth quarter, the Patriots again punted, ending a drive that began on the final play of the third quarter. The Raiders' ensuing possession went 10 plays and spanned as far as the Patriots' 43-yard line, but a Russell incomplete pass on a fourth down conversion attempt turned the ball over on downs. Three plays later, Jordan, a former Raider, ran 49 yards for his first touchdown of the season, increasing the Patriots lead to 49–20. Continuing to kick away from Miller, Gostkowski landed his next kickoff at the Raiders' 29-yard line; a 14-yard Michael Bush return gave the Raiders the ball at their own 43-yard line. The Raiders then proceeded to move 57 yards on 11 plays, ending the drive with an 11-yard McFadden touchdown run. Russell could not complete a pass to wide receiver Chaz Schilens on the two-point conversion attempt, keeping the score at 49–26 with just under two minutes remaining. The Patriots then ran out the clock to end the game and maintain a three-way tie for first place on the AFC East. The win was Belichick's 100th as head coach of the Patriots, a week after recording his 150th win as a head coach overall.

=== Week 16 ===
Team	1	2	3	4	Total
Cardinals	0	0	0	7	7
• Patriots	14	17	13	3	47

- Date: December 21
- Location: Gillette Stadium, Foxboro, MA
- Game start: 1:00 p.m. EST
- Elapsed time: 3:07
- Game attendance: 68,756
- Game weather: Snow; 30 °F or −1.1 °C; wind 10 miles per hour (16 km/h; 8.7 kn)
- Referee: Bill Leavy
- TV announcers (Fox): Kenny Albert, Daryl Johnston, and Tony Siragusa

Scoring summary
Q1	9:01	NE	Jordan 1 yard run (Gostkowski kick)	NE 7–0
Q1	3:48	NE	Jordan 3 yard run (Gostkowski kick)	NE 14–0
Q2	12:12	NE	Faulk 15 yard pass from Cassel (Gostkowski kick)	NE 21–0
Q2	1:57	NE	Welker 11 yard pass from Cassel (Gostkowski kick)	NE 28–0
Q2	:07	NE	Gostkowski 38 yard field goal	NE 31–0
Q3	14:55	NE	Moss 76 yard pass from Cassel (Gostkowski kick)	NE 38–0
Q3	8:25	NE	Gostkowski 35 yard field goal	NE 41–0
Q3	3:35	NE	Gostkowski 24 yard field goal	NE 44–0
Q4	14:55	NE	Gostkowski 30 yard field goal	NE 47–0
Q4	6:30	ARI	Fitzgerald 78 yard pass from Leinart (Rackers kick)	NE 47–7

In their final home game of the regular season, the Patriots faced the Cardinals, who had already clinched the NFC West division title, in snowy and eventually rainy weather. The Patriots deferred the opening coin toss, giving the Cardinals the ball to start the game. Without starting wide receiver Anquan Boldin, who was not active for the game with an injury, the Cardinals went three-and-out; Welker returned the punt 28 yards to the Cardinals' 33-yard line. Passing once on a seven-play drive and using backup guard Russ Hochstein as a fullback, the Patriots took a 7–0 lead on a 1-yard Jordan touchdown run. The Cardinals' ensuing possession was again a three-and-out, and a 36-yard punt by Ben Graham, released by the Jets earlier in the season, helped the Patriots start their next drive from their own 45-yard line. Two plays in, a Cassel pass to Morris went for 42 yards, putting the Patriots in the Cardinals' red zone. Jordan would soon score his second touchdown of the game on a 3-yard run that gave the Patriots a 14–0 lead. For their third straight possession, the Cardinals would be again forced to punt, facing a 4th-and-16 after a third down sack of quarterback Kurt Warner split by Seymour and Wright. However, the Patriots, despite starting from their own 44-yard line, were then forced to punt on a three-and-out drive. On the next play, which ended the first quarter, Mayo forced a fumble of Cardinals running back Tim Hightower on the Cardinals' 12-yard line that was recovered by former Patriots tight end Stephen Spach at the Cardinals' 4-yard line.

Three plays later, the Cardinals punted to the Patriots, who began their next series from midfield. Two plays in, Cassel connected with Gaffney on a 37-yard completion, and then again to Faulk two plays later for a 15-yard touchdown reception, putting the Patriots ahead 21–0. Beginning from their own 19-yard line the Cardinals moved to the Patriots' 31-yard line on nine plays, but could not convert a 4th-and-1 pass on the tenth play, turning the ball over on downs. The Patriots responded with a 12-play, 69-play drive culminating in an 11-yard Welker touchdown catch that gave the Patriots a 28–0 lead; Welker celebrated by making a snow angel in the end zone, costing the Patriots 15 yards on an unsportsmanlike conduct penalty. As a result, the Cardinals began their next drive from their own 39-yard line, but punted again after three plays. With 1:24 remaining in the first half, the Patriots then moved from their own 29-yard line to the Cardinals' 20-yard line, but could get no further and on the final play of the half, Gostkowski kicked a 38-yard field goal to give the Patriots a 31–0 lead.

With the ball to begin the second half as the result of their opening coin toss deferral, the Patriots extended their lead to 38–0 on the first play, a screen pass to Moss that went for a 76-yard touchdown. The Cardinals again went three-and-out, and a 28-yard reception by Evans put the Patriots in Cardinals territory on one play. Nine plays later, on a 3rd-and-5 from the Cardinals' 5-yard line, Cassel was sacked by linebacker Karlos Dansby, setting up a 35-yard Gostkowski field goal that increased the Patriots' lead to 41–0. Yet another Cardinals three-and-out meant the Patriots began their next drive from the Cardinals' 49-yard line. An 11-play, 44-yard drive followed, and ended in a 24-yard Gostkowski field goal that put the Patriots' lead at 44–0. The field goal was Gostkowski's 33rd of the season, breaking Tony Franklin's record of 32 field goals in 1986. On their ensuing possession, the Cardinals converted a first down, but quarterback Matt Leinart, playing in place of Warner, was sacked for a loss of four yards, fumbling; the Cardinals recovered at their own 27-yard line. Two plays later, Leinart was strip-sacked by a blitzing Meriweather for a loss of 12 yards, but this time defensive lineman Jarvis Green recovered the ball for the Patriots at the Cardinals' 15-yard line. The Patriots would be unable to score, forcing Gostkowski to kick a 30-yard field goal on the second play of the fourth quarter, giving the Patriots a 47–0 lead.

Leinart completed a 28-yard pass to wide receiver Jerheme Urban on the Cardinals' next drive, but Leinart's next pass attempt to Urban, two plays later, was tipped and intercepted by Hobbs at the Patriots' 37-yard line and returned for a loss of seven yards. With a 47-point lead, O'Connell replaced Cassel for the Patriots' next possession, which went three-and-out. An exchange of punts followed, giving the Cardinals the ball again at their own 29-yard line. Two plays in, Leinart threw a 78-yard touchdown pass to wide receiver Larry Fitzgerald, putting the Cardinals on the board at 47–7. With six minutes left in the game, Jordan and Morris each ran three times for a first down each to bring the game to the two-minute warning; O'Connell then kneeled three times to end the game. The 47 points scored brought the Patriots to four 40-point games on the season, tying the team record set in 2007, and gave the Patriots the only back-to-back 40-point games of any NFL team in 2008.

=== Week 17 ===
Team	1	2	3	4	Total
• Patriots	3	0	7	3	13
Bills	0	0	0	0	0

- Date: December 28
- Location: Ralph Wilson Stadium, Orchard Park, NY
- Game start: 1:00 p.m. EST
- Elapsed time: 2:44
- Game attendance: 71,282
- Game weather: Cloudy; 39 °F or 3.9 °C; wind 30 miles per hour (48 km/h; 26 kn)
- Referee: Gene Steratore
- TV announcers (CBS): Greg Gumbel and Dan Dierdorf

Scoring summary
Q1	3:05	NE	Gostkowski 33 yard field goal	NE 3–0
Q3	4:41	NE	Jordan 2 yard run (Gostkowski kick)	NE 10–0
Q4	10:18	NE	Gostkowski 23 yard field goal	NE 13–0

The Patriots traveled to Buffalo for their regular season finale, needing a win and help from either the Dolphins or Ravens to make the postseason. With winds gusting over 50 mph, the Patriots elected to defend a goal after winning the opening coin toss. After receiving the opening kickoff, the Bills, who were without injured starting running back Marshawn Lynch ran six times with Fred Jackson and Xavier Omon before punting; Moorman's punt traveled 13 yards. Starting from their own 49-yard line, the Patriots ran with Morris and Jordan before also punting. McKelvin muffed the punt, which was touched by Slater, who could not secure the ball, just before rolling into the end zone for a touchback. The Bills' next possession was a three-and-out, and this time Moorman's punt went 35 yards to the Patriots' 37-yard line. The game's first pass came two plays later, when Evans caught a pass in the flat and gained 19 yards. Cassel's second pass a few plays later was good again to Evans for 12 yards, but his third, on 3rd-and-4 from the Bills' 15-yard line was incomplete to Welker. Gostkowski then kicked a 33-yard field goal to give the Patriots a 3–0 lead.

The first play of the second quarter saw the first Bills pass attempt of the game, which was complete to wide receiver Lee Evans for 13 yards. The Bills reached the Patriots' 28-yard line before attempting a 47-yard field goal; Lindell's kick started off by moving left before being caught by the wind and falling wide right. The Patriots' ensuing drive went 55 yards on 13 plays, all hand-offs or scrambles, but stalled at the Bills' 8-yard line. Before Gostkowski attempted the 26-yard field goal, officials allowed for the straightening of the goalposts which had been shifted by the winds. However, Gostkowski's kick went wide right, leaving the score at Patriots 3, Bills 0. Beginning from their own 20-yard line with 4:16 remaining in the half, the Bills moved to the Patriots' 12-yard line, where they faced a 3rd-and-5 with 22 seconds to play. After a 3-yard Jackson run, Bills center Duke Preston became involved in a scuffle with Patriots defenders, and the clock ran out before the Bills could clear the field to attempt a field goal.

On the opening drive of the second half, Cassel was sacked on third down by Kyle Williams to force a Patriots punt. Five plays later, Edwards was strip-sacked by Green at the Bills' 43-yard line, where Vrabel recovered the fumble. The Patriots proceeded to run nine straight times, including a 6-yard Cassel scramble on 4th-and-6 from the Bills' 25-yard line, to reach the Bills' 14-yard line on 4th-and-5. The Patriots opted not to attempt a field goal and instead Cassel completed a 12-yard pass to Welker to extend the drive. On the next play, Jordan ran in for a 2-yard touchdown that gave the Patriots a 10–0 lead. The Bills' next possession went three-and-out, setting the Patriots up to begin from their own 15-yard line. On a 15-play drive that spanned into the fourth quarter, the Patriots moved 80 yards, with help on Moss' first catch of the day, good for 13 yards, and bettered their lead to 13–0 on a 23-yard Gostkowski field goal. With the wind beginning to subside, Edwards completed passes of 14, 18, and 16 yards on the Bills' next series, but he could not complete a 4th-and-1 pass from the Patriots' 39-yard line to turn the ball over on downs. Three plays later, on a 3rd-and-8, Cassel pooch-punted into Bills' territory, but without a punt returner, the ball was allowed to roll to the Bills' 2-yard line, where the 57-yard punt was downed by a group of Patriots. Despite this field position, the Bills were able to move to the Patriots' 34-yard line on 14 plays, but turned the ball over on downs on a failed 4th-and-10 conversion. The Patriots punted on third down again on their last drive, giving the Bills the ball for the game's final series, which ended on a Jackson run to the Patriots' 41-yard line.

The shutout win was the Patriots' first since 2006, while the Patriots' eight passing attempts were the second fewest in franchise history, behind only the three attempts in the Snowplow Game of 1982. This game also cemented an NFL record for the Patriots for the fewest penalties in a 16-game season, with 57, breaking the 2007 Seattle Seahawks' former record of 59 in a season. New England had done what they needed to do, but unfortunately watched as Miami and Baltimore won their late games and left the Dolphins as the 2008 AFC East champs, the Ravens as a wild card team, and the Patriots missing the playoffs for the first time since 2002 and only time until 2020.

== Standings ==
AFC East
	W	L	T	PCT	DIV	CONF	PF	PA	STK
^{(3)} Miami Dolphins	11	5	0	.688	4–2	8–4	345	317	W5
New England Patriots	11	5	0	.688	4–2	7–5	410	309	W4
New York Jets	9	7	0	.563	4–2	7–5	405	356	L2
Buffalo Bills	7	9	0	.438	0–6	5–7	336	342	L1

=== Conference standings ===
AFC
#	Team	Division	W	L	T	PCT	DIV	CONF	SOS	SOV	STK
Division leaders
1	Tennessee Titans	South	13	3	0	.813	4–2	9–3	.459	.425	L1
2	Pittsburgh Steelers	North	12	4	0	.750	6–0	10–2	.525	.458	W1
3 (Note: Miami finished ahead of New England in the AFC East based on better conference record.)	Miami Dolphins	East	11	5	0	.688	4–2	8–4	.461	.398	W5
4 (Note: San Diego finished ahead of Denver in the AFC West based on better division record.)	San Diego Chargers	West	8	8	0	.500	5–1	7–5	.516	.398	W4
Wild Cards
5	Indianapolis Colts	South	12	4	0	.750	4–2	10–2	.498	.492	W9
6 (Note: Baltimore clinched the AFC #6 seed over New England based on better conference record.)	Baltimore Ravens	North	11	5	0	.688	4–2	8–4	.521	.412	W2
Did not qualify for the postseason
7	New England Patriots	East	11	5	0	.688	4–2	7–5	.480	.403	W4
8	New York Jets	East	9	7	0	.563	4–2	7–5	.471	.462	L2
9 (Note: Houston finished ahead of Denver based on better winning percentage vs. common opponents (3–2 against 2–3 vs. Miami, Oakland, Jacksonville and Cleveland).)	Houston Texans	South	8	8	0	.500	2–4	5–7	.518	.410	W1
10	Denver Broncos	West	8	8	0	.500	3–3	5–7	.457	.438	L3
11	Buffalo Bills	East	7	9	0	.438	0–6	5–7	.453	.304	L1
12 (Note: Oakland finished ahead of Jacksonville based on better conference record.)	Oakland Raiders	West	5	11	0	.313	2–4	4–8	.520	.450	W2
13	Jacksonville Jaguars	South	5	11	0	.313	2–4	3–9	.537	.425	L2
14	Cincinnati Bengals	North	4	11	1	.281	1–5	3–9	.553	.297	W3
15	Cleveland Browns	North	4	12	0	.250	1–5	3–9	.572	.445	L6
16	Kansas City Chiefs	West	2	14	0	.125	2–4	2–10	.537	.406	L4
Tiebreakers (Note: When breaking ties for three or more teams under the NFL's rules, they are first broken within divisions, then comparing only the highest ranked remaining team from each division.)

=== Breakdown ===
	W	L	T	Pct.	PF	PA
Home	5	3	0	.625	202	155
Away	6	2	0	.750	208	154
AFC East Opponents	4	2	0	.667	144	120
AFC Opponents	7	5	0	.583	286	244
NFC Opponents	4	0	0	1.000	124	65
By Stadium Type
Indoors	0	0	0	--	--	--
Outdoors	11	5	0	.688	410	309

== Final roster ==
New England Patriots 2008 final roster
Quarterbacks: 16 Matt Cassel; 7 Matt Gutierrez; 5 Kevin O'Connell ^{R}; Running backs: 44 Heath Evans FB; 33 Kevin Faulk PR; 42 BenJarvus Green-Ellis ^{UR}; 32 LaMont Jordan; 34 Sammy Morris; Wide receivers: 88 Sam Aiken; 10 Jabar Gaffney; 81 Randy Moss; 18 Matthew Slater KR ^{R}; 15 Kelley Washington; 83 Wes Welker PR; Tight ends: 85 Tyson DeVree ^{UR}; 86 David Thomas; 84 Ben Watson	Offensive linemen: 65 Wesley Britt T; 63 Dan Connolly C/G; 71 Russ Hochstein C/G; 77 Nick Kaczur T; 67 Dan Koppen C; 64 Mark LeVoir T; 72 Matt Light T; 70 Logan Mankins G; 61 Stephen Neal G; 74 Billy Yates G; Defensive linemen: 97 Jarvis Green DE; 93 Richard Seymour DE; 90 Le Kevin Smith NT; 94 Ty Warren DE; 75 Vince Wilfork NT; 99 Mike Wright DE	Linebackers: 54 Tedy Bruschi ILB; 95 Rosevelt Colvin OLB; 59 Gary Guyton ILB/OLB ^{UR}; 53 Larry Izzo OLB; 51 Jerod Mayo ILB ^{R}; 49 Vince Redd OLB ^{UR}; 55 Junior Seau ILB; 50 Mike Vrabel OLB; Defensive backs: 27 Ellis Hobbs CB/KR; 31 Brandon Meriweather SS; 21 Deltha O'Neal CB; 35 Mike Richardson CB; 36 James Sanders FS; 29 Lewis Sanders CB/FS; 28 Antwain Spann CB; 41 Ray Ventrone SS; 24 Jonathan Wilhite CB ^{R}; Special teams: 3 Stephen Gostkowski K; 6 Chris Hanson P; 66 Lonie Paxton LS	Reserve lists: 52 Eric Alexander LB (IR); 12 Tom Brady QB (IR); 98 Shawn Crable LB (IR) ^{R}; 37 Rodney Harrison S (IR); 39 Laurence Maroney RB (IR); 68 Ryan O'Callaghan T (IR); 91 Bo Ruud LB (IR) ^{R}; -- Kenny Smith DE/NT (IR); 75 Barry Stokes G/T (IR); 96 Adalius Thomas LB (IR); 22 Terrence Wheatley CB (IR) ^{R}; 26 Tank Williams S (IR); 58 Pierre Woods LB (IR); Practice squad: 62 Titus Adams DE; 48 Angelo Craig LB ^{R}; 30 Mark Dillard S ^{UR}; 1 Tom Malone P; 17 Maurice Price WR; 92 Darrell Robertson LB ^{UR}; 69 Ryan Wendell C ^{UR}; Notations: R: 2008 Rookie; UR: 2008 Undrafted Rookie; Italicized players are not on the 53-man roster.; 53 active, 13 inactive, 7 practice squad

== Awards and honors ==
Recipient	Award(s)
Matt Cassel	Week 7: AFC Offensive Player of the Week; Week 12: AFC Offensive Player of the Week
Stephen Gostkowski	October: AFC Special Teams Player of the Month
Chris Hanson	Week 17: AFC Special Teams Player of the Week
Ellis Hobbs	Week 15: AFC Special Teams Player of the Week
Larry Izzo	2008 New England Patriots Ron Burton Community Service Award
Jerod Mayo	October: NFL Defensive Rookie of the Month; 2008 Associated Press NFL Defensive Rookie of the Year
Sammy Morris	2008 New England Patriots Ed Block Courage Award

=== Pro Bowl and All-Pro selections ===
Two Patriots were elected to the 2009 Pro Bowl. Kicker Stephen Gostkowski was named as a starter, while wide receiver Wes Welker was named as a reserve.

Gostkowski and Welker were also voted to the 2008 All-Pro First Team and Second Team, respectively. Gostkowski received 28 of 50 votes at kicker, while Welker received 6 votes at wide receiver; three other Patriots—guard Logan Mankins, wide receiver Randy Moss, and rookie inside linebacker Jerod Mayo—also received votes.
