= Mark LeVoir =

American football player (born 1982)

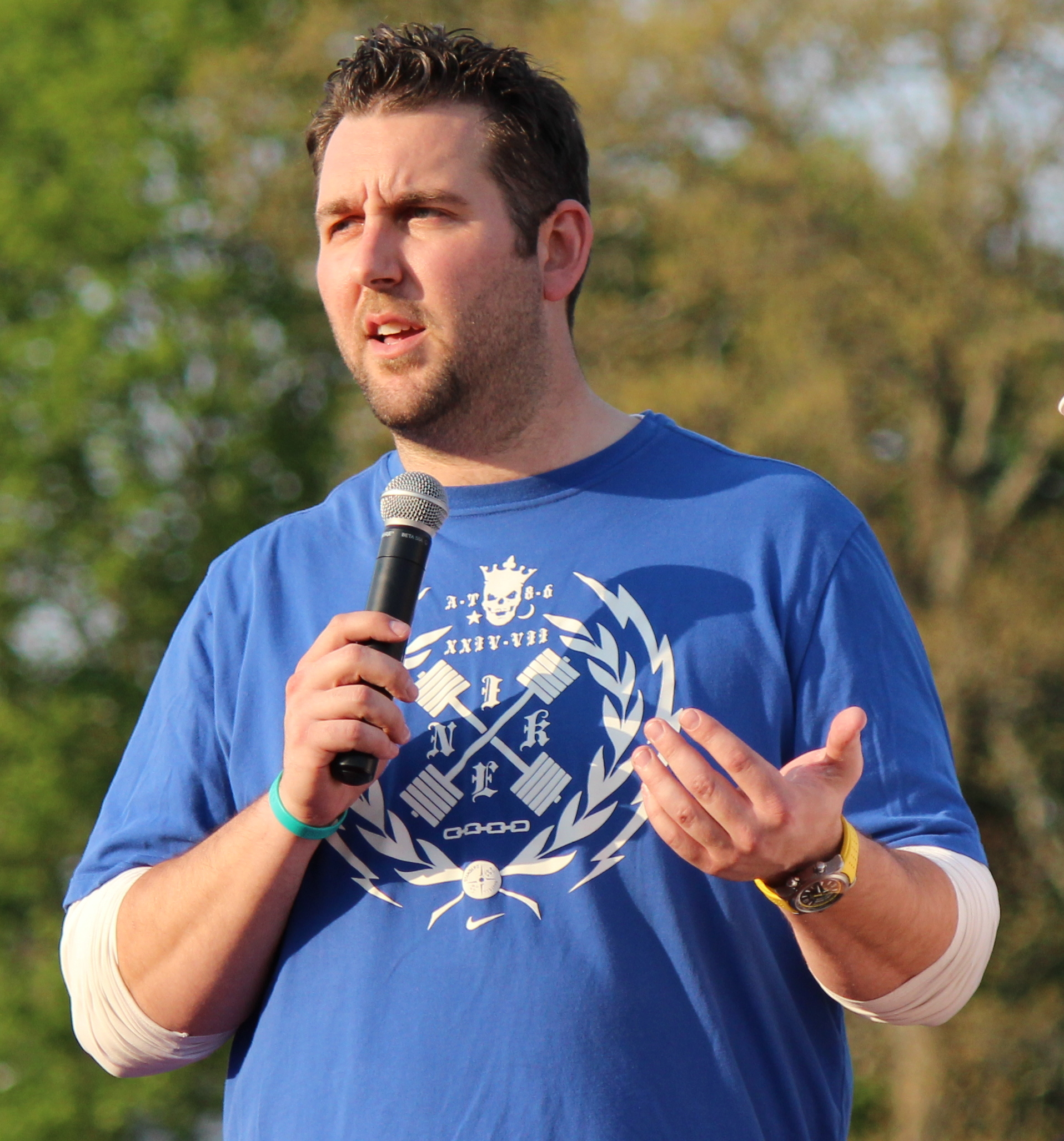
- LeVoir in 2016

No. 64, 71, 79
- Position: Offensive tackle

Personal information
- Born: July 29, 1982 (age 44); Minneapolis, Minnesota, U.S.
- Listed height: 6 ft 7 in (2.01 m)
- Listed weight: 310 lb (141 kg)

Career information
- High school: Eden Prairie (Eden Prairie, Minnesota)
- College: Notre Dame
- NFL draft: 2006: undrafted

Career history
- Chicago Bears (2006–2007)*; St. Louis Rams (2007); New England Patriots (2008–2010); Baltimore Ravens (2011); St. Louis Rams (2011)
- * Offseason or practice squad member only

Career NFL statistics
- Games played: 37
- Games started: 3
- Fumble recoveries: 2
- Stats at Pro Football Reference

Mark Jacob LeVoir (/ləˈvɔːr/; born July 29, 1982) is an American former professional football player who was an offensive tackle in the National Football League (NFL). He played college football for the Notre Dame Fighting Irish and was signed by the Chicago Bears as an undrafted free agent in 2006.

LeVoir was also a member of the St. Louis Rams, New England Patriots, and Baltimore Ravens.

== Early life ==
LeVoir played tight end at Eden Prairie High School, near Minneapolis, where he was a Parade All-American and first-team USA Today All-American.

== College career ==
LeVoir moved from tight end to the offensive line in 2001, his freshman year at Notre Dame. He started 37 consecutive games during the final three years of his college career.

== Professional career ==
=== Chicago Bears ===
After signing with the Bears as an undrafted free agent on May 5, 2006, LeVoir was waived by the team on September 2, 2006, and re-signed to the team's practice squad the next day, where he spent the entire 2006 season. He was signed to a future contract on February 2, 2007, but was waived again by the team on September 2, 2007, and re-signed to the team's practice squad the next day.

=== St. Louis Rams (first stint) ===
On November 13, 2007, the Rams signed LeVoir to their 53-man roster from the Bears' practice squad, and there LeVoir spent the remainder of the 2007 season before signing a future contract after the season. He was waived by the Rams on August 31, 2008.

=== New England Patriots ===
LeVoir was claimed off waivers by the Patriots on September 1, 2008. He was active for all 16 games in 2008, and started two games in place of injured right tackle Nick Kaczur.

On August 25, 2009, the Patriots signed LeVoir to a contract extension through 2011; the deal included a $400,000 signing bonus. He began the 2009 season on the Physically Unable to Perform list with a shoulder injury. He was activated on October 24, in Week 7. He was active for the final 10 games of the season, seeing time as the third offensive tackle on the field.

In 2010, LeVoir was active for six games, all as a reserve. He was released on August 17, 2011.

=== Baltimore Ravens ===
On August 20, 2011, LeVoir signed with the Baltimore Ravens. He was released on October 18.

=== St. Louis Rams (second stint) ===
LeVoir re-signed with the St. Louis Rams on October 26, 2011. He has since been released.
