= Mike Wright (defensive end) =

American football player (born 1982)

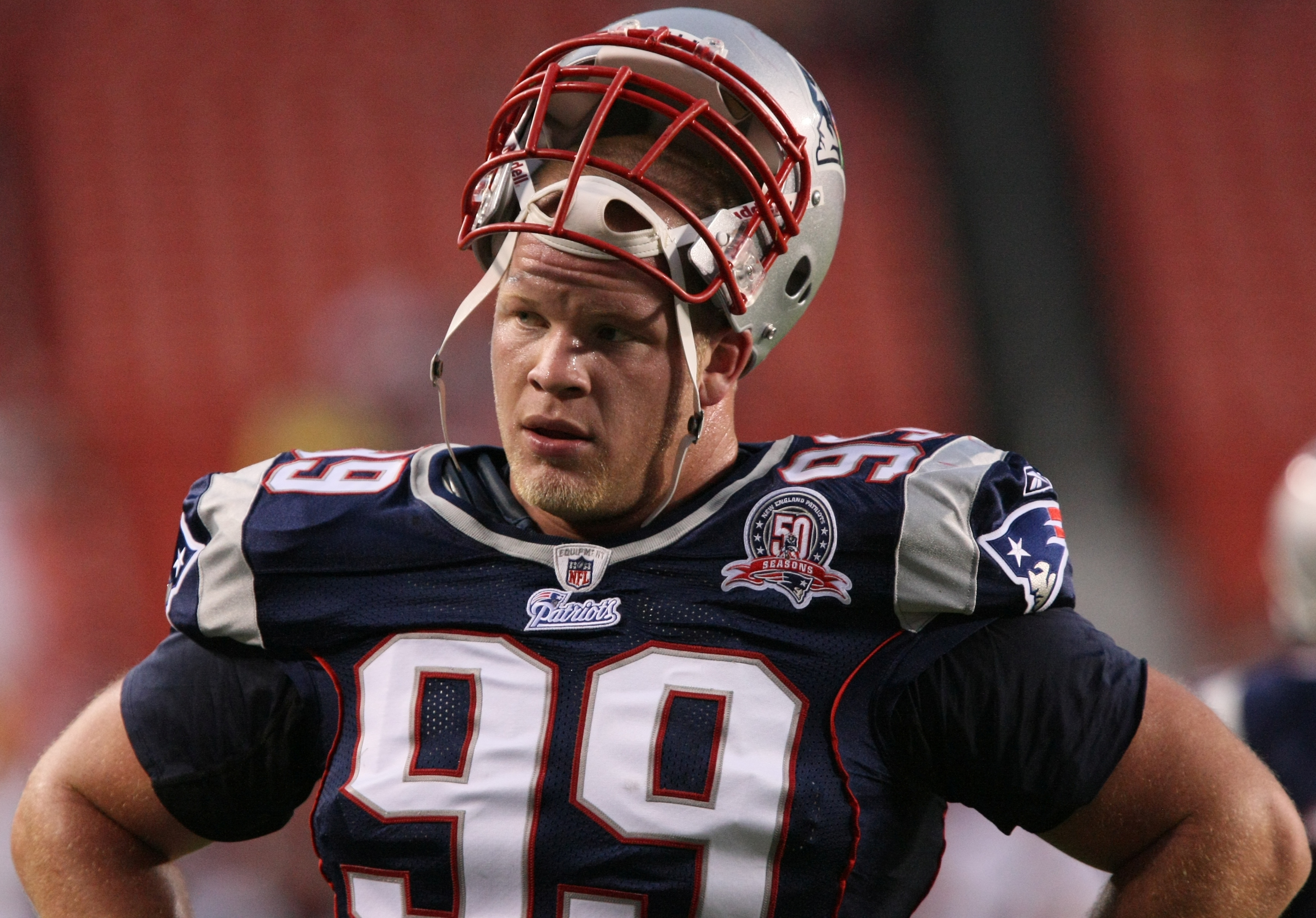
- Wright with the New England Patriots in 2009

No. 99
- Position: Defensive end

Personal information
- Born: March 1, 1982 (age 44); Cincinnati, Ohio, U.S.
- Listed height: 6 ft 4 in (1.93 m)
- Listed weight: 295 lb (134 kg)

Career information
- High school: Purcell Marian (Cincinnati)
- College: Ashland (2000) Cincinnati (2001–2004)
- NFL draft: 2005: undrafted

Career history
- New England Patriots (2005–2011)

Career NFL statistics
- Total tackles: 134
- Sacks: 15
- Forced fumbles: 4
- Fumble recoveries: 3
- Pass deflections: 2
- Stats at Pro Football Reference

Michael Wright (born March 1, 1982) is an American former professional football player who was a defensive end for the New England Patriots of the National Football League (NFL). He was signed by the Patriots as an undrafted free agent in 2005. He played college football for the Cincinnati Bearcats.

== Early life ==
Wright was born in Cincinnati, Ohio. He attended Springer School and Center for his pre-secondary education. He graduated from Purcell Marian High School in Cincinnati in 2000. He was a letterman and a starter for two years; as a senior, he won All-City and All-State honors.

== College career ==
After high school, Wright attended Ashland University, where he played football for a season in 2000. In 2001, he transferred to the University of Cincinnati, where he walked-on to the football team. He was redshirted his freshman season in 2001, and missed his sophomore season in 2002 with a knee injury. In 2003, he made six starts on the defensive line for Cincinnati and was named the team's defensive newcomer of the year. Wright recorded 42 tackles in his senior season in 2004 in addition to blocking an extra point.

== Professional career ==
=== New England Patriots ===
Wright was signed by the New England Patriots after going undrafted in the 2005 NFL draft. He made the Patriots' roster out of training camp and played in 13 games in his 2005 rookie season. He was placed on injured reserve on January 6, 2007, and missed the team's two playoff games. In the second week of the 2006 season, Wright made his first career start, and made four overall starts on the year. He led the team once in tackles and twice in special teams tackles in 2006.

Wright played in nine games in 2007 before being placed on injured reserve on December 13. He returned in 2008 to play in all 16 games, starting two. He finished the season with a career-high 2.5 sacks and 33 tackles. Wright was re-signed by the Patriots to a four-year contract in March 2009 after failing to find a starting job on the free agent market.

Wright played in all 16 games for the Patriots in 2009, starting nine. He finished the season with 35 tackles and five sacks. In 2010, Wright missed the final six games of the regular season with a concussion, but recorded 14 tackles and 5.5 sacks in his 10 games played (five starts). Wright was placed on injured reserve on January 7, 2011, during the playoffs, after having not played since November 21, 2010.

In 2011 Wright started in the season opener against the Dolphins in Miami. In that game he recorded 1 tackle half a sack while putting consistent pressure on Dolphins quarterback Chad Henne. He suffered from a concussion in this game and another some time soon after. He was cut from the Patriots on February 22, 2012.
