= Mark Dillard =

American football player (born 1986)

Profile
- Position: Safety

Personal information
- Born: December 5, 1986 (age 39); Baton Rouge, Louisiana
- Listed height: 5 ft 11 in (1.80 m)
- Listed weight: 210 lb (95 kg)

Career information
- High school: Baton Rouge (LA) Glen Oaks
- College: Louisiana Tech
- NFL draft: 2008: undrafted

Career history
- New England Patriots (2008)*
- * Offseason or practice squad member only

Mark Dillard (born December 5, 1986) is an American former football safety. He was signed by the New England Patriots as an undrafted free agent in 2008. He played college football at Louisiana Tech.

== Professional career ==
=== New England Patriots ===
Dillard was signed by the Patriots as an undrafted free agent on May 1, 2008. He was waived by the team on August 30, 2008, and signed to the team's practice squad on September 1, 2008. He was waived from the practice squad on September 10, 2008, and re-signed to the team's practice squad on September 15, 2008. He was again waived from the Patriots' practice squad on September 24, 2008. He was then re-signed to the Patriots' practice squad on October 22. His contract expired after the season.
