= Vince Redd =

American gridiron football player (born 1985)

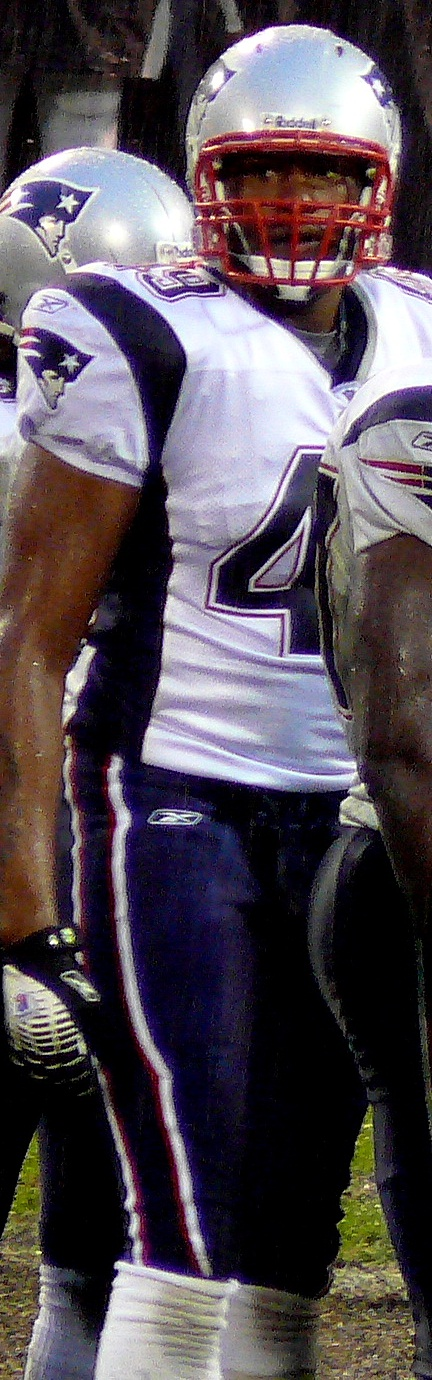
- Redd with the New England Patriots in 2008

No. 49
- Position: Defensive lineman

Personal information
- Born: September 1, 1985 (age 41); Elizabethton, Tennessee, U.S.
- Listed height: 6 ft 6 in (1.98 m)
- Listed weight: 260 lb (118 kg)

Career information
- High school: Elizabethton
- College: Liberty
- NFL draft: 2008: undrafted

Career history
- New England Patriots (2008); Kansas City Chiefs (2009)*; Calgary Stampeders (2009)*; Alabama Vipers (2010); Hartford Colonials (2010)*; New Yorker Lions (2013)
- * Offseason or practice squad member only

Career NFL statistics
- Tackles: 8
- Stats at Pro Football Reference
- Stats at CFL.ca (archive)

Vincent Edward Redd (born September 1, 1985) is an American former professional football player who was a defensive lineman in the National Football League (NFL). He was signed by the New England Patriots as an undrafted free agent in 2008. He played college football for the Virginia Cavaliers and Liberty Flames.

Redd was also a member of the Kansas City Chiefs, Calgary Stampeders, Alabama Vipers, Hartford Colonials and New Yorker Lions.

== Early life ==
Redd attended Elizabethton High School in Elizabethton, Tennessee, and was listed as the No. 12 defensive end nationally. He was named to the Orlando Sentinel All-Southern team after he tallied 104 tackles in his career. Redd was also a standout on the basketball team and lettered in track and field, where he helped set the state record in the 400-meter relay. That record was later broken by Craig Bowling, also from Elizabethton. Additionally, Redd finished fourth in the state championship in the shot put as a junior.

== College career ==
In 2007, Redd had 63 tackles, 6.5 sacks and two interceptions at Liberty University. He redshirted for the 2006 season after transferring from the University of Virginia. In 2005, he played in 10 out of 12 games for the Cavaliers and finished with 16 tackles and three TFL. In 2004 with the Cavaliers, played in all 12 and saw time at linebacker and on special teams return units.

== Professional career ==
=== New England Patriots ===
Redd was signed by the New England Patriots as an undrafted free agent on May 1, 2008, following the 2008 NFL draft. He was waived by the team on August 30, 2008, and signed to the team's practice squad on September 1, 2008. He was then promoted to the team's active roster on November 22, 2008. He was waived on August 2, 2009, after the team signed linebacker Rob Ninkovich.

=== Kansas City Chiefs ===
A day after being waived by the New England Patriots, Redd was claimed off waivers by the Kansas City Chiefs on August 3, 2009. He was waived on August 24. The same day, it was revealed was suspended four games by the NFL for violation of the league's drug policy.

=== Calgary Stampeders ===
Redd signed a practice roster agreement with the Calgary Stampeders on October 8, 2009, after his NFL suspension ended.

=== Alabama Vipers ===
Redd signed with the Alabama Vipers of Arena Football 1 on December 15, 2009.

=== New Yorker Lions ===
Redd signed with the New Yorker Lions of the German Football League on February 17, 2013.
