= Mike Richardson (American football, born 1984) =

American football player (born 1984)

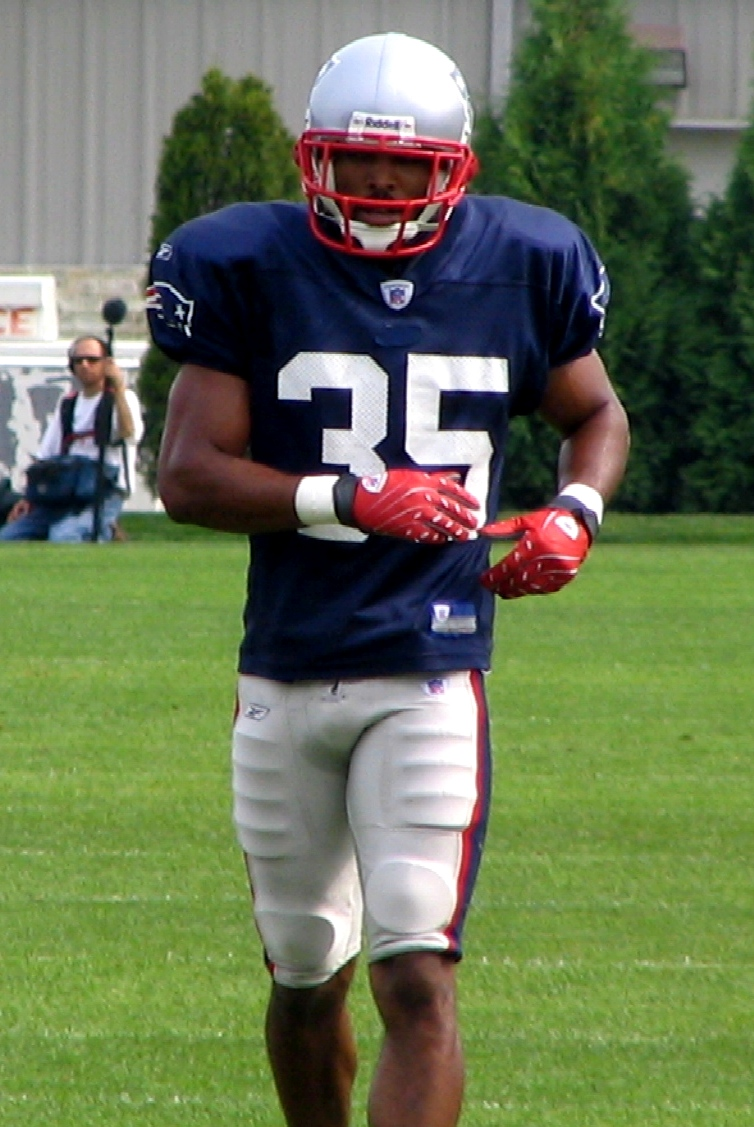
- Richardson with the New England Patriots in 2007

No. 35, 23, 37
- Position: Cornerback

Personal information
- Born: February 18, 1984 (age 42); Sumter, South Carolina, U.S.
- Listed height: 5 ft 11 in (1.80 m)
- Listed weight: 190 lb (86 kg)

Career information
- High school: Warner Robins (GA)
- College: Notre Dame
- NFL draft: 2007: 6th round, 202nd overall pick

Career history
- New England Patriots (2007–2008); Kansas City Chiefs (2009–2010); Indianapolis Colts (2010)

Career NFL statistics
- Total tackles: 32
- Forced fumbles: 1
- Stats at Pro Football Reference

Michael Isaiah Richardson (born February 18, 1984) is an American former professional football player who was a cornerback in the National Football League (NFL). He was selected by the New England Patriots in the sixth round of the 2007 NFL draft. He also played for the Kansas City Chiefs and Indianapolis Colts. He played college football for the Notre Dame Fighting Irish.

== Early life ==
Richardson attended Warner Robins High School in Warner Robins, Georgia and was a letterman in football and track. In football, he was a two-time All-League pick.

== College career ==
After graduating from high school, Richardson attended the University of Notre Dame. After redshirting his freshman season in 2002, Richardson played in all 13 games in 2003, mainly on special teams, seeing time at cornerback in three games. He started five games in 2004 at cornerback, recording one interception and forcing three fumbles. In 2005, Richardson would start all 12 games at cornerback and finished fifth on the team with 66 tackles while also picking up three interceptions. As a fifth-year senior in 2006, Richardson would lead all Division I-A independent schools with four interceptions. Richardson would play his final two seasons at Notre Dame under former Patriots offensive coordinator Charlie Weis, who became the Fighting Irish's head coach in 2005.

== Professional career ==
=== Pre-draft ===
Richardson measured in at 5'10" 188 pounds at his Pro Day.

He ran a 4.48 40-yard dash (1.47 10-yard split) with a 4.05 20-yard shuttle and 6.27 3 cone time. He had a vertical jump of 36" and broad jumped 10'7".

=== New England Patriots ===
Richardson was selected by the Patriots in the sixth round of the 2007 NFL draft with the 202nd overall pick. He was placed on injured reserve by the team on August 28, 2007.

Richardson was waived by the Patriots on August 30, 2008, during final cuts. He was re-signed to the team's practice squad on September 1, where he remained until he was then promoted to the Patriots' active roster on October 20. That day, Richardson made his regular season debut on Monday Night Football against the Denver Broncos and picked up a season-high six tackles. Richardson would go on to play 10 games as a reserve cornerback for the Patriots in 2008, recording 17 total tackles.

He was released by the Patriots on August 17, 2009.

=== Kansas City Chiefs ===
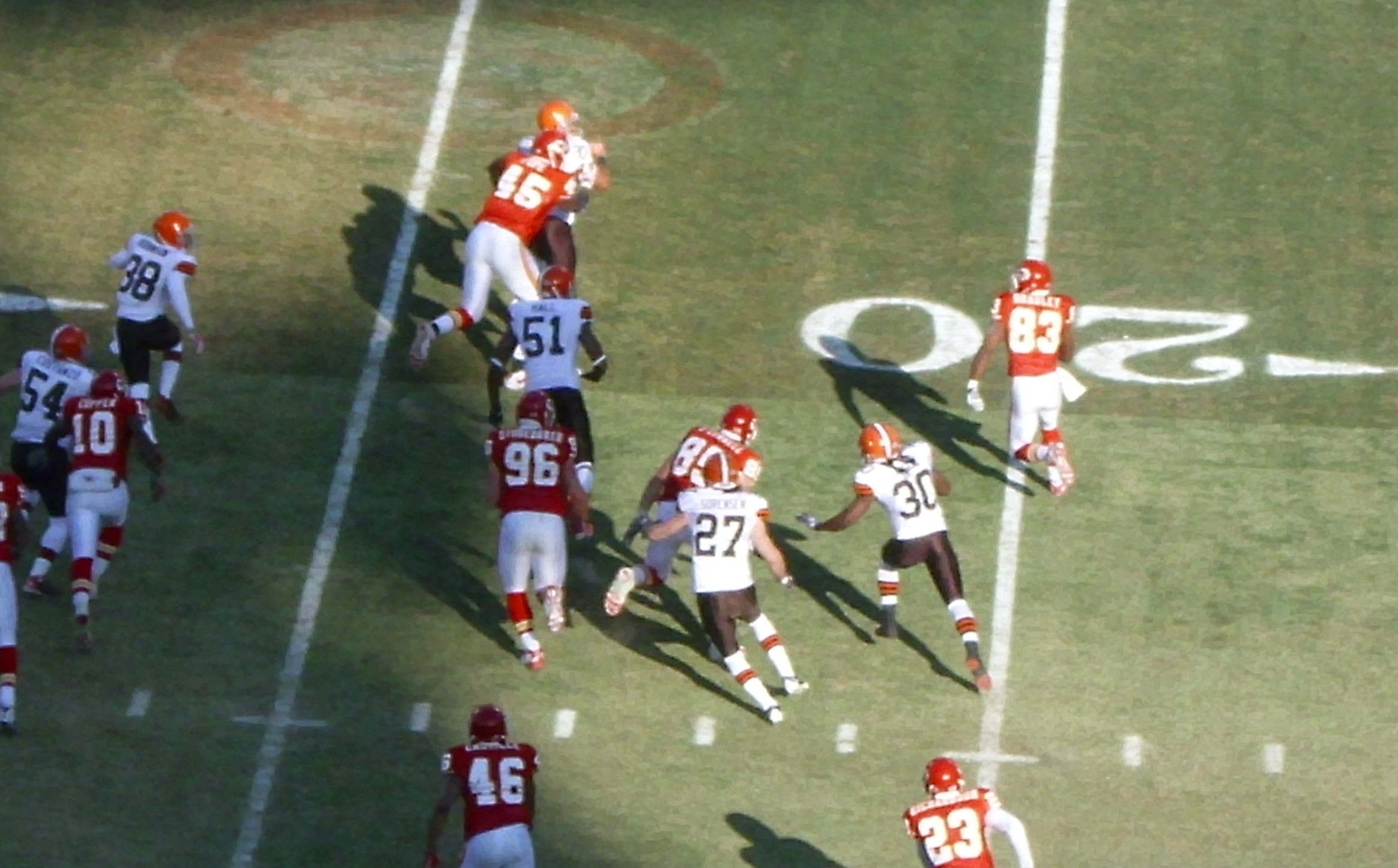
Richardson (#23) blocks for a teammate.

On September 30, 2009, Richardson signed with the Kansas City Chiefs. The Chiefs released Richardson on September 3, 2010, after training camp but was resigned on December 1, 2010. After playing in zero games, he was again released on December 26, 2010.

=== Indianapolis Colts ===
On December 27, 2010, Richardson was claimed off waivers by the Indianapolis Colts. He made his first appearance on January 2, 2011, against the Tennessee Titans on special teams and as a reserve cornerback and recorded 1 tackle.
