= Tank Williams =

American football player (born 1980)

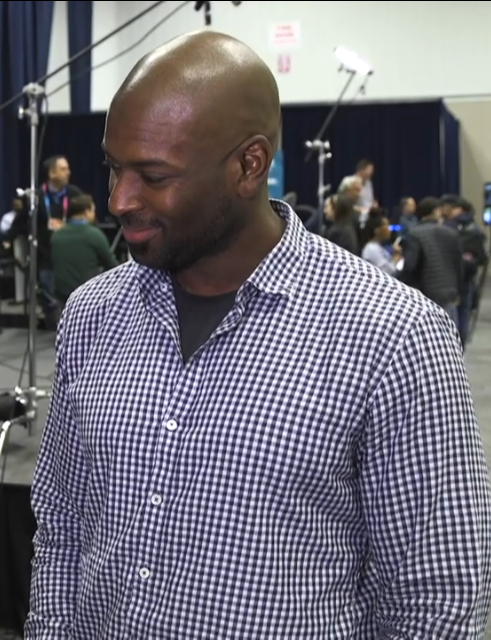
- Williams in 2019

Stanford Cardinal
- Title: Defensive quality control analyst

Personal information
- Born: June 30, 1980 (age 46); Gulfport, Mississippi, U.S.
- Listed height: 6 ft 3 in (1.91 m)
- Listed weight: 223 lb (101 kg)

Career information
- High school: Bay Saint Louis (MS)
- College: Stanford
- NFL draft: 2002: 2nd round, 45th overall pick

Career history

Playing
- Tennessee Titans (2002–2005); Minnesota Vikings (2006–2007); New England Patriots (2008)

Coaching
- Stanford (2024–present) Defensive quality control analyst

Awards and highlights
- First-team All-American (2001); First-team All-Pac-10 (2001); Second-team All-Pac-10 (2000)

Career NFL statistics
- Total tackles: 283
- Sacks: 3.5
- Forced fumbles: 3
- Fumble recoveries: 3
- Interceptions: 5
- Stats at Pro Football Reference

Clevan "Tank" Williams (born June 30, 1980) is an American former professional football player who was a safety in the National Football League (NFL). He played college football for the Stanford Cardinal and was selected by the Tennessee Titans in the second round of the 2002 NFL draft. He also played for the Minnesota Vikings and New England Patriots. Williams is currently a fantasy football analyst at Yahoo! Sports and a real-estate agent in the San Francisco area.

== Early life ==
Williams attended Bay High School in Bay St. Louis, Mississippi where he played football as a safety as well as a quarterback. He also played basketball and ran track all four years in high school. During high school, he was also employed by the Winn-Dixie grocery store in Bay St. Louis where he worked as a bag boy.

According to Williams, his nickname came from his sister: as an infant, he drank so much milk that his sister suggested to his mother that his mother should give him a tank of milk instead of a bottle.

== College career ==
Williams attended Stanford University, where he played in 10 games as a true freshman in 1998. He started six games at free safety in 1999, and earned second-team All-Pacific-10 Conference honors as a junior. In his senior season, Williams was a first-team All-Pac-10 pick, becoming the first defensive back in school history to win national first-team honors.

== Professional career ==
=== Tennessee Titans ===
Drafted by the Titans in the second round (45th overall) in the 2002 NFL draft, Williams started every game as a rookie for the Titans in 2002. He started every game in 2003 as well, posting 81 tackles, fourth on the Titans' defense that was best in the NFL against the run. His 2004 season was cut short by a knee injury that landed him on injured reserve on November 29. He returned in 2005 to start every game for the Titans, recording a career-high 83 tackles.

=== Minnesota Vikings ===
Williams signed with the Minnesota Vikings as a free agent in March 2006. On August 6, 2006, Williams was placed on the injured reserve for the 2006 season after shattering his kneecap. The Vikings re-signed Williams to a one-year deal after the season. He started only two games in 2007, recording 18 tackles on the year.

=== New England Patriots ===
Williams signed a one-year contract with the New England Patriots on March 5, 2008. Williams sustained a severe injury to his knee in training camp which caused him to be put on injured reserve, ending his season. Williams was re-signed by the Patriots on March 16, 2009. He was released on August 25 when the team signed third-round pick Tyrone McKenzie.

=== NFL statistics ===
Year	Team	GP	COMB	TOTAL	AST	SACK	FF	FR	FR YDS	INT	IR YDS	AVG IR	LNG IR	TD	PD
2002	TEN	16	61	46	15	2.0	2	1	0	1	0	0	0	0	6
2003	TEN	16	74	51	23	0.5	0	0	0	2	0	0	0	0	6
2004	TEN	9	52	41	11	1.0	1	1	0	1	13	13	13	0	2
2005	TEN	16	78	58	20	0.0	0	1	0	1	1	1	1	0	5
2007	MIN	13	18	15	3	0.0	0	0	0	0	0	0	0	0	1
Career		70	283	211	72	3.5	3	3	0	5	14	3	13	0	20

== Coaching career ==
In July, 2024, Williams was hired at his alma mater, Stanford as a defensive quality control analyst.
