= 2005 New England Patriots season =

46th season in franchise history

- Owner: Robert Kraft
- President: Jonathan Kraft
- Head coach: Bill Belichick
- Home stadium: Gillette Stadium

Results
- Record: 10–6
- Division place: 1st AFC East
- Playoffs: Won Wild Card Playoffs (vs Jaguars) 28–3; Lost Divisional Playoffs (at Broncos) 13–27
- All-Pros: DE Richard Seymour (1st team); QB Tom Brady (2nd team)
- Pro Bowlers: QB Tom Brady; DE Richard Seymour

Uniform

The 2005 season was the New England Patriots' 36th in the National Football League (NFL), their 46th overall and their sixth under head coach Bill Belichick. For the first time since 1994, Ty Law was not on the opening day roster. With a Week 6 loss to the Denver Broncos, the Patriots failed to either improve or match their 14–2 record from last season; they finished with a 10–6 record and the division title before losing in the playoffs to the Broncos, ending their hopes of becoming the first NFL team to three peat in the Super Bowl.

Ten days after earning a victory in Super Bowl XXXIX, linebacker Tedy Bruschi suffered a stroke and initially planned on missing the entire season; Bruschi returned to the field against the Buffalo Bills on October 30. Cornerback Ty Law was released in the offseason, and injuries at cornerback, as well as a season-ending injury to safety Rodney Harrison in Week 3, forced the Patriots to start a number of players in the secondary early in the season. Overall, injuries caused the Patriots to start 45 different players at one point or another during the season, an NFL record for a division champion (breaking the record of 42 set by the Patriots in 2003).

Beginning the season with a 4–4 record, the Patriots lost their first game at home since 2002 against the San Diego Chargers in Week 4. The team ended the season on a 6–2 run to finish 10–6, earning their third straight AFC East title. (The Patriots were the first team in NFL history to alternate wins and losses in each of their first nine games.)

With the fourth seed in the AFC playoffs, the Patriots defeated the Jacksonville Jaguars in the wild card round but fell to the Denver Broncos on the road in the divisional round, committing five turnovers in the game and marking the first playoff loss in the Brady/Belichick era and the first since 1998. They were the last defending champion to win a playoff game until the 2014 Seattle Seahawks. This would begin an 18-season stretch in which the defending NFL champions failed to defend their Super Bowl title before eventually being broken by the 2023 Kansas City Chiefs.

== Offseason ==
=== Tedy Bruschi suffers a stroke ===
On February 16, 2005, three days after playing in the 2005 Pro Bowl in Honolulu, Hawaii, linebacker Tedy Bruschi suffered a mild stroke while at his home in North Attleborough, Massachusetts. Bruschi, who awoke to blurred vision and temporary numbness, was rushed to Massachusetts General Hospital after a 9-1-1 call by his wife, Heidi. Without any long-term effects, Bruschi underwent heart surgery to repair a congenital condition in his heart known as an atrial septal defect.

Bruschi announced his intentions to sit out the 2005 season on July 20, while still citing his ongoing health improvement following the stroke. Following this announcement, Bruschi was placed on the Physically Unable to Perform list, keeping him inactive for a minimum of six games to begin the 2005 campaign. This is particularly notable, as the Patriots decided to forgo placing Bruschi on the injured reserve list, which would have prohibited him from playing in any 2005 games. With the window left open for his return, Bruschi returned to the practice field on October 19, during the Patriots' bye week. Only three months after announcing his plans to sit out the entire season, Bruschi returned to the Patriots for their next game against the Buffalo Bills on October 30. Bruschi would go on to play the rest of the season, only missing the Patriots' final game of the regular season as well as their first playoff game due to a leg injury.

=== Staff changes ===
Bill Belichick lost both of his coordinators following the 2004 season. Offensive coordinator Charlie Weis left to become head coach at the University of Notre Dame, while defensive coordinator Romeo Crennel was named head coach of the Cleveland Browns. Belichick only replaced Crennel for the 2005 season, promoting defensive backs coach Eric Mangini to defensive coordinator. Assistant offensive line and tight ends coach Jeff Davidson followed Crennel to Cleveland, and was replaced as tight ends coach by Pete Mangurian and as assistant offensive line coach by offensive coaching assistant Matt Patricia. Also departing was assistant strength and conditioning coach Markus Paul, who was replaced by former Canadian Football League star Harold Nash, and defensive coaching assistant Cory Undlin, who followed Crennel to the Browns as a defensive quality control coach. Undlin was replaced as a defensive coaching assistant by Mike Judge. Former assistant running backs/wide receivers coach Joel Collier rejoined the staff as an assistant defensive backs coach.

In the front office, Senior Vice President and Chief Operating Officer Andy Wasynczuk left the organization to join Harvard Business School. Assistant Director of College Scouting Lionel Vital and assistant director of Pro Scouting Keith Kidd also departed; Vital became a national scout with the Baltimore Ravens, while Kidd joined ESPN.com.

=== Departures ===
Free agency saw the departure of only one full-time starter from 2004, offensive guard Joe Andruzzi, who signed with the Cleveland Browns. However, three-time Pro Bowl defensive back Ty Law was released in a salary cap move and would stay in the division, signing with the New York Jets. Veteran linebacker Roman Phifer, who had started on all three of the Patriots' Super Bowl teams, was also released, along with nose tackle Keith Traylor. Long-time Patriot linebacker Ted Johnson was a surprise departure, retiring on the eve of training camp. Other free agency departures were Adrian Klemm (Green Bay Packers) and David Patten (Washington Redskins).

=== Arrivals ===
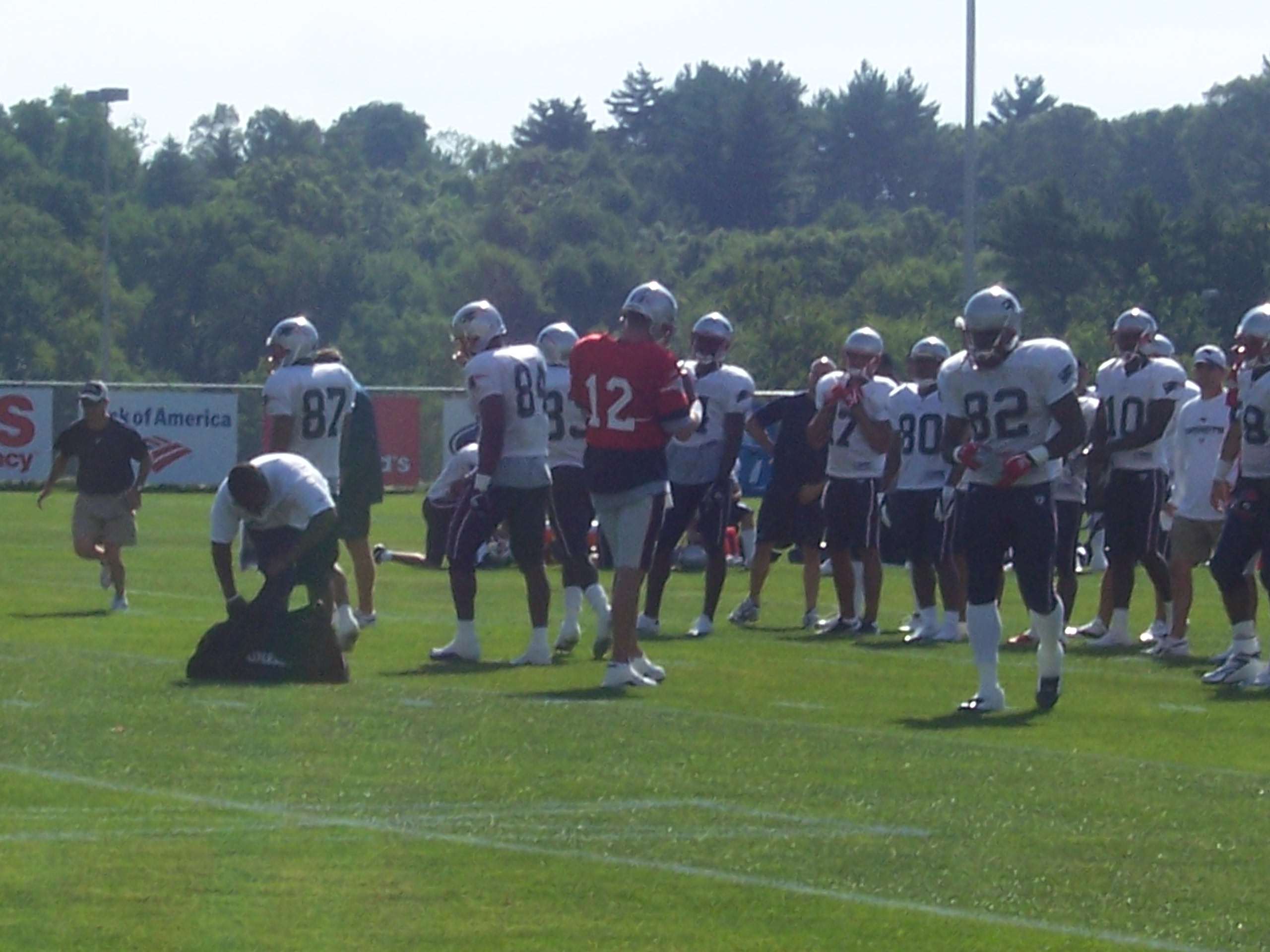
The Patriots' offense practices during the first training camp practice

Unlike past Patriots offseasons, the 2005 offseason did not bring the arrival of any would-be full-time starters. Linebackers Chad Brown and Monty Beisel started six games together to begin the season, but both were benched in favor of Mike Vrabel and Tedy Bruschi, after returning from his stroke. Veteran quarterback and New England native Doug Flutie returned to the Patriots for the final season of his career, having last played for them in 1989. In November, facing multiple injuries to their defensive backfield, the Patriots signed veteran cornerback Artrell Hawkins, who would go on to start six games, including both of the Patriots' playoff games. Other arrivals were Chad Scott, Wesly Mallard, Tim Dwight, Antuan Edwards, Chad Morton, and David Terrell, but only Scott and Dwight finished the season with the Patriots.

Free agents or potential free agents Brandon Gorin, Patrick Pass, Stephen Neal, Tom Ashworth, Don Davis, David Givens, Jarvis Green, and Troy Brown (after being released) were all re-signed, while Tom Brady, Mike Vrabel, and Green all received long-term contract extensions. Defensive end Richard Seymour held out for the first four days of training camp but returned after receiving a raise. Kicker Adam Vinatieri signed and played the full season under his franchise tag tender.

On March 4, the Patriots traded a third round pick and a fifth round pick in the 2005 NFL draft to the Arizona Cardinals for safety Duane Starks and a fifth-round pick in the 2005 draft. Starks started six-straight games for the Patriots before being placed on injured reserve in November. Also, during the preseason, the Patriots traded their fifth-round pick in the 2006 NFL draft to the Cleveland Browns for wide receiver André Davis, who started four games for the Patriots in 2005 after being released and re-signed.

=== 2005 NFL draft ===
2005 New England Patriots draft selections
| Round | Overall | Player | Position | College |
|---|---|---|---|---|
| 1 | 32 | Logan Mankins | Offensive guard | Fresno State |
| 3 | 84 | Ellis Hobbs | Cornerback | Iowa State |
| 3 | 100 | Nick Kaczur | Offensive tackle | Toledo |
| 4 | 133 | James Sanders | Safety | Fresno State |
| 5 | 170 | Ryan Claridge | Linebacker | UNLV |
| 7 | 230 | Matt Cassel | Quarterback | Southern California |
| 7 | 255 | Andy Stokes | Tight end | William Penn |

| compensatory selection |

== Staff ==
2005 New England Patriots staff
| Front office: Chairman/CEO – Robert Kraft; Vice chairman/president – Jonathan Kraft; Vice president of player personnel – Scott Pioli; Director of pro personnel – Nick Caserio; Director of college scouting – Thomas Dimitroff; Football research director – Ernie Adams; Head coaches: Head coach – Bill Belichick; Assistant head coach/offensive line – Dante Scarnecchia; Offensive coaches: Quarterbacks – Josh McDaniels; Running backs – Ivan Fears; Wide receivers – Brian Daboll; Tight ends – Pete Mangurian; Assistant offensive line – Matt Patricia | Defensive coaches: Defensive coordinator – Eric Mangini; Defensive line – Pepper Johnson; Linebackers – Dean Pees; Assistant secondary – Joel Collier; Special teams coaches: Special teams – Brad Seely; Coaching assistant – Mike Judge; Strength and conditioning: Strength and conditioning – Mike Woicik; Assistant strength and conditioning – Harold Nash |

== Opening training camp roster ==
As of the Patriots' first training camp practice at Gillette Stadium on July 29, they had 79 players signed to their roster, one short of the NFL maximum of 80 players. Richard Seymour did not count against the limit as he held out of the start of training camp and was placed on the Reserve/Did Not Report list. Michael McGrew also did not count against the limit after being waived/injured the day before training camp began. Finally, the Patriots received seven total roster exemptions for the NFL Europe allocations of Ricky Bryant, Kory Chapman, Joel Jacobs, Cedric James, and Grant Steen (one for each player, plus two bonus exemptions because of the time Chapman and James spent on practice squads in 2004).

New England Patriots 2005 opening training camp roster
| Quarterbacks: 12 Tom Brady; 16 Matt Cassel ^{R}; 6 Rohan Davey; 2 Doug Flutie; Running backs: 32 Kory Chapman; 34 Cedric Cobbs; 28 Corey Dillon; 39 Kyle Eckel FB ^{UR}; 33 Kevin Faulk; 35 Patrick Pass FB; Wide receivers: 19 Eugene Baker; 83 Deion Branch; 80 Troy Brown; 19 Ricky Bryant; 13 Bam Childress ^{UR}; 87 David Givens; 18 Cedric James; 9 Rich Musinski; 14 P. K. Sam; 17 Jake Schifino; 10 David Terrell; Tight ends: 88 Christian Fauria; 82 Daniel Graham; 47 Joel Jacobs; 46 Andy Stokes ^{R}; 84 Benjamin Watson; 85 Jed Weaver | Offensive linemen: 68 Tom Ashworth OT; 76 Brandon Gorin OT; 71 Russ Hochstein G/C; 77 Nick Kaczur OT ^{R}; 67 Dan Koppen C; 60 Ryan Krug G ^{UR}; 65 Victor Leyva OT; 72 Matt Light OT; 70 Logan Mankins G ^{R}; 64 Gene Mruczkowski G/C; 61 Stephen Neal G; 62 Jeff Roehl OT; 74 Billy Yates G/C; Defensive linemen: 96 Rodney Bailey DE; 97 Jarvis Green DE; 91 Marquise Hill DE; 90 Dan Klecko NT; 92 Santonio Thomas DE/NT ^{UR}; 94 Ty Warren DE; 75 Vince Wilfork NT; 69 Mike Wright NT/DE ^{UR} | Linebackers: 49 Eric Alexander ILB; 48 Tully Banta-Cain OLB; 44 Monty Beisel ILB; 98 Chad Brown ILB; 58 Matt Chatham ILB; 47 Ryan Claridge ILB ^{R}; 59 Rosevelt Colvin OLB; 51 Don Davis ILB; 53 Larry Izzo ILB; 45 Wesly Mallard ILB; 55 Willie McGinest OLB; 46 Grant Steen OLB; 43 Andre Torrey OLB ^{UR}; 50 Mike Vrabel OLB; Defensive backs: 42 Antuan Edwards FS; 21 Randall Gay CB; 37 Rodney Harrison SS; 27 Ellis Hobbs CB ^{R}; 38 Tyrone Poole CB; 31 Hank Poteat CB; 24 Dexter Reid SS; 22 Asante Samuel CB; 36 James Sanders SS ^{R}; 30 Chad Scott CB; 29 Guss Scott FS; 23 Duane Starks CB; 41 Ray Ventrone SS ^{UR}; 26 Eugene Wilson FS; Special teams: 3 Robbie Gould K ^{UR}; 5 Rhett Kopp P ^{UR}; 8 Josh Miller P; 66 Lonie Paxton LS; 4 Adam Vinatieri K | Reserve lists: 54 Tedy Bruschi ILB (Active/PUP); 86 Tim Dwight WR (Active/PUP); 81 Bethel Johnson WR/KR (Active/PUP); 99 Ethan Kelley NT (Active/NF-Inj.); 15 Michael McGrew WR (Waived/Injured) ^{UR}; 25 Chad Morton RB (Active/PUP); 93 Richard Seymour DE (did not report); Notations: R: 2005 Rookie; UR: 2005 Undrafted Rookie; Italicized players are not on the 80-man roster. |

== 2005 New England Patriots schedule ==
=== Preseason ===
| Week | Date | Opponent | Result | Record | Venue | Recap |
|---|---|---|---|---|---|---|
| 1 | August 12 | at Cincinnati Bengals | W 23–13 | 1–0 | Paul Brown Stadium | Recap |
| 2 | August 18 | New Orleans Saints | L 27–37 | 1–1 | Gillette Stadium | Recap |
| 3 | August 26 | at Green Bay Packers | W 27–3 | 2–1 | Lambeau Field | Recap |
| 4 | September 1 | New York Giants | L 3–27 | 2–2 | Gillette Stadium | Recap |

=== Regular season ===
| Week | Date | Opponent | Result | Record | Venue | Recap |
|---|---|---|---|---|---|---|
| 1 | September 8 | Oakland Raiders | W 30–20 | 1–0 | Gillette Stadium | Recap |
| 2 | September 18 | at Carolina Panthers | L 17–27 | 1–1 | Bank of America Stadium | Recap |
| 3 | September 25 | at Pittsburgh Steelers | W 23–20 | 2–1 | Heinz Field | Recap |
| 4 | October 2 | San Diego Chargers | L 17–41 | 2–2 | Gillette Stadium | Recap |
| 5 | October 9 | at Atlanta Falcons | W 31–28 | 3–2 | Georgia Dome | Recap |
| 6 | October 16 | at Denver Broncos | L 20–28 | 3–3 | Invesco Field at Mile High | Recap |
| 7 | Bye | | | | | |
| 8 | October 30 | Buffalo Bills | W 21–16 | 4–3 | Gillette Stadium | Recap |
| 9 | November 7 | Indianapolis Colts | L 21–40 | 4–4 | Gillette Stadium | Recap |
| 10 | November 13 | at Miami Dolphins | W 23–16 | 5–4 | Dolphins Stadium | Recap |
| 11 | November 20 | New Orleans Saints | W 24–17 | 6–4 | Gillette Stadium | Recap |
| 12 | November 27 | at Kansas City Chiefs | L 16–26 | 6–5 | Arrowhead Stadium | Recap |
| 13 | December 4 | New York Jets | W 16–3 | 7–5 | Gillette Stadium | Recap |
| 14 | December 11 | at Buffalo Bills | W 35–7 | 8–5 | Ralph Wilson Stadium | Recap |
| 15 | December 17 | Tampa Bay Buccaneers | W 28–0 | 9–5 | Gillette Stadium | Recap |
| 16 | December 26 | at New York Jets | W 31–21 | 10–5 | Giants Stadium | Recap |
| 17 | January 1 | Miami Dolphins | L 26–28 | 10–6 | Gillette Stadium | Recap |

=== Postseason schedule ===
| Playoff round | Date | Opponent (seed) | Result | Record | Venue | Recap |
|---|---|---|---|---|---|---|
| Wild Card | January 7, 2006 | Jacksonville Jaguars (5) | W 28–3 | 1–0 | Gillette Stadium | Recap |
| Divisional | January 14, 2006 | at Denver Broncos (2) | L 13–27 | 1–1 | Invesco Field at Mile High | Recap |

== Week 1 roster ==
New England Patriots 2005 Week 1 roster
| Quarterbacks: 12 Tom Brady; 16 Matt Cassel ^{R}; 2 Doug Flutie; Running backs: 28 Corey Dillon; 33 Kevin Faulk; 35 Patrick Pass FB; Wide receivers: 83 Deion Branch; 80 Troy Brown; 18 André Davis; 86 Tim Dwight; 87 David Givens; 81 Bethel Johnson; Tight ends: 88 Christian Fauria; 82 Daniel Graham; 84 Benjamin Watson | Offensive linemen: 68 Tom Ashworth OT; 76 Brandon Gorin OT; 71 Russ Hochstein G; 77 Nick Kaczur OT ^{R}; 67 Dan Koppen C; 72 Matt Light OT; 70 Logan Mankins G ^{R}; 61 Stephen Neal G; Defensive linemen: 97 Jarvis Green DE; 91 Marquise Hill DE; 90 Dan Klecko NT; 93 Richard Seymour DE; 94 Ty Warren DE; 75 Vince Wilfork NT; 99 Mike Wright DE ^{UR} | Linebackers: 48 Tully Banta-Cain OLB; 52 Monty Beisel ILB; 98 Chad Brown ILB; 58 Matt Chatham ILB; 59 Rosevelt Colvin OLB; 51 Don Davis ILB; 53 Larry Izzo ILB; 96 Wesly Mallard ILB; 55 Willie McGinest OLB; 50 Mike Vrabel OLB; Defensive backs: 21 Randall Gay CB; 37 Rodney Harrison SS; 27 Ellis Hobbs CB ^{R}; 38 Tyrone Poole CB; 22 Asante Samuel CB; 36 James Sanders SS ^{R}; 30 Chad Scott CB; 29 Guss Scott FS; 23 Duane Starks CB; 26 Eugene Wilson FS; Special teams: 8 Josh Miller P; 66 Lonie Paxton LS; 4 Adam Vinatieri K | Reserve lists: 54 Tedy Bruschi ILB (PUP); 47 Ryan Claridge ILB (IR) ^{R}; 18 Cedric James WR (NFLE NF-Inj.); 15 Michael McGrew WR (IR) ^{UR}; Practice squad: 49 Eric Alexander ILB; 65 Wesley Britt OT ^{R}; 32 Kory Chapman RB; 13 Bam Childress WR ^{UR}; 46 Jared Newberry ILB; 14 P. K. Sam WR; 43 Andre Torrey OLB ^{UR}; 74 Billy Yates G/C; Notations: R: 2005 Rookie; UR: 2005 Undrafted Rookie; Italicized players are not on the 53-man roster. |

== Regular season results ==
=== Week 1 ===
Oakland Raiders (0–0) at New England Patriots (0–0)

| Team | 1 | 2 | 3 | 4 | Total |
|---|---|---|---|---|---|
| Raiders | 7 | 7 | 0 | 6 | 20 |
| • Patriots | 10 | 7 | 6 | 7 | 30 |

- Date: September 8
- Location: Gillette Stadium, Foxborough, Massachusetts
- Game start: 9:00 p.m. EST
- Game attendance: 68,756
- Game weather: Party cloudy, 74 °F (23 °C)
- Referee: Tony Corrente
- TV announcers (ABC): Al Michaels, John Madden, and Michele Tafoya

Scoring summary
| 1 | OAK | Courtney Anderson 2-yard pass from Kerry Collins (Sebastian Janikowski kick) | Raiders 7–0 |
| 1 | NE | Adam Vinatieri 26-yard field goal | Raiders 7–3 |
| 1 | NE | Deion Branch 18-yard pass from Tom Brady (Adam Vinatieri kick) | Patriots 10–7 |
| 2 | OAK | Randy Moss 73-yard pass from Kerry Collins (Sebastian Janikowski kick) | Raiders 14–10 |
| 2 | NE | Tim Dwight 5-yard pass from Tom Brady (Adam Vinatieri kick) | Patriots 17–14 |
| 3 | NE | Corey Dillon 8-yard run (kick failed) | Patriots 23–14 |
| 4 | NE | Corey Dillon 2-yard run (Adam Vinatieri kick) | Patriots 30–14 |
| 4 | OAK | Courtney Anderson 5-yard pass from Kerry Collins (pass failed) | Patriots 30–20 |

Coming off their second straight Super Bowl win, the Patriots and Gillette Stadium played host to the extravagant NFL kickoff celebration and the Oakland Raiders. The reality of the new season would hit the Patriots hard on the game's first drive, with a long catch by Randy Moss setting up a 2-yard touchdown catch from Kerry Collins to tight end Courtney Anderson. The Patriots would respond with an Adam Vinatieri field goal, and then take the lead on an 18-yard touchdown reception by reigning Super Bowl MVP Deion Branch. In the second quarter, Moss tore through the Patriots' secondary again, this time taking a 73-yard catch the distance for a touchdown. The Patriots would re-take the lead on the next drive when Brady hit Tim Dwight on a 5-yard scoring strike. After a Jarvis Green strip-sack of Collins was recovered by Vince Wilfork deep in Raiders' territory, the Patriots expanded their lead on an 8-yard Corey Dillon touchdown run. In the fourth quarter, Dillon ran for a 2-yard touchdown that gave the Patriots a 30–14 lead. Following a blocked Josh Miller punt, the Raiders had the ball in Patriots territory and capitalized, with Collins completing a 5-yard touchdown pass to Anderson. The Patriots then ran out the clock to secure a 30–20 opening victory.

=== Week 2 ===
| Team | 1 | 2 | 3 | 4 | Total |
|---|---|---|---|---|---|
| Patriots | 7 | 0 | 10 | 0 | 17 |
| • Panthers | 7 | 10 | 3 | 7 | 27 |

- Date: September 18
- Location: Bank of America Stadium, Charlotte, North Carolina
- Game start: 1:00 p.m. EST
- Game attendance: 73,528
- Game weather: Sunny, 90 °F (32 °C)
- Referee: Walt Anderson
- TV announcers (CBS): Dick Enberg, Dan Dierdorf, and Armen Keteyian

=== Week 3 ===
| Team | 1 | 2 | 3 | 4 | Total |
|---|---|---|---|---|---|
| • Patriots | 7 | 0 | 3 | 13 | 23 |
| Steelers | 10 | 0 | 3 | 7 | 20 |

- Date: September 25
- Location: Heinz Field, Pittsburgh, Pennsylvania
- Game start: 4:15 p.m. EST
- Game attendance: 64,868
- Game weather: Partly cloudy, 83 °F (28 °C)
- Referee: Bill Carollo
- TV announcers (CBS): Jim Nantz, Phil Simms, and Bonnie Bernstein

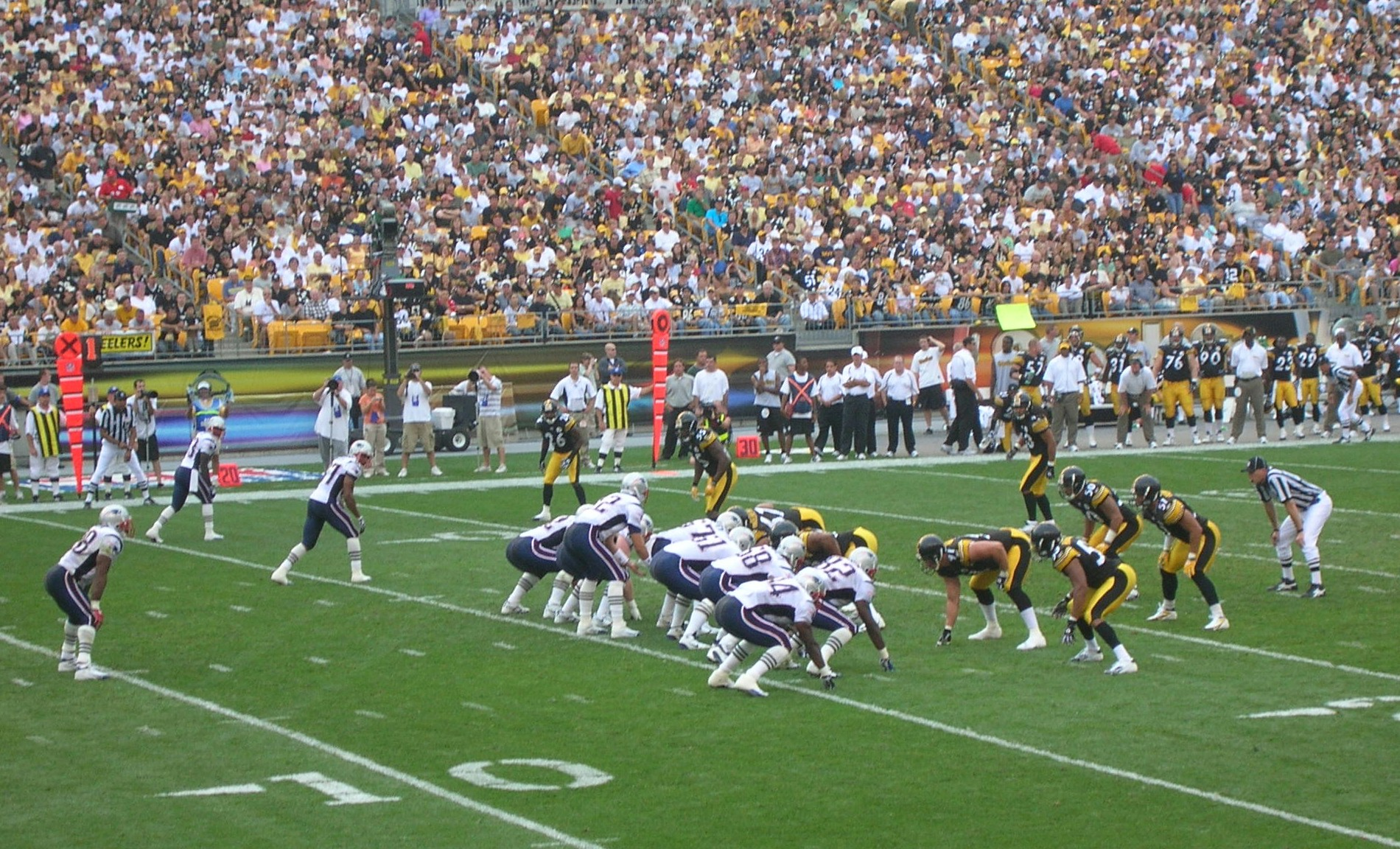
Patriots' offense against the Steelers at Heinz Field

In a much-anticipated re-match of the previous season's AFC Championship game, the Patriots traveled to Heinz Field to face the Steelers.

After the Patriots took an early lead on a 4-yard Corey Dillon touchdown run, the Steelers responded when Ben Roethlisberger connected with Hines Ward on an 85-yard touchdown catch the very next play. The Steelers took a lead on a Jeff Reed field goal and then recovered a Kevin Faulk fumble deep in Steelers' territory.

Roethlisberger would then hit Antwaan Randle El on a 49-yard play, but Randle El would unsuccessfully attempt a lateral to Ward at the Patriots' 11-yard line, which was recovered by the Patriots. Brady would make a second foray into the Steelers' red zone late in the first half, but the Patriots would again come up short when Brady's pass was tipped and intercepted by the Steelers.

The struggles would continue for the Patriots in the third quarter, which Vinatieri missing a field goal before Faulk fumbled for the second time in the game, recovered by the Steelers, who then took a 13–7 lead on a field goal.

The game then turned in the Patriots' favor, with Vinatieri hitting a field goal before Brady mounted an 86-yard scoring drive that ended in Dillon's second touchdown of the day, giving the Patriots the lead.

Another Vinatieri field goal proved important, as the Steelers tied the game on a 4-yard Roethlisberger-to-Ward strike with just over a minute remaining. With seconds remaining, the Patriots drove into Steelers territory and Vinatieri's 43-yard field goal attempt was good, sealing a 23–20 Patriots victory.

The win would prove costly for the Patriots, though, who lost starting tackle Matt Light and safety Rodney Harrison to season-ending injuries.

=== Week 4 ===
| Team | 1 | 2 | 3 | 4 | Total |
|---|---|---|---|---|---|
| • Chargers | 3 | 14 | 14 | 10 | 41 |
| Patriots | 7 | 10 | 0 | 0 | 17 |

- Date: October 2
- Location: Gillette Stadium, Foxborough, Massachusetts
- Game start: 1:00 p.m. EST
- Game attendance: 68,756
- Game weather: Sunny, 73 °F (23 °C)
- Referee: Bill Leavy
- TV announcers (CBS): Jim Nantz, Phil Simms, and Bonnie Bernstein

This was New England's first home loss since Week 16 in 2002 against the Jets, snapping a franchise-record 18-game home winning streak in the regular season.

=== Week 5 ===
| Team | 1 | 2 | 3 | 4 | Total |
|---|---|---|---|---|---|
| • Patriots | 14 | 0 | 14 | 3 | 31 |
| Falcons | 0 | 13 | 0 | 15 | 28 |

- Date: October 9
- Location: Georgia Dome, Atlanta
- Game start: 1:00 p.m. EST
- Game attendance: 71,079
- Game weather: indoors (dome)
- Referee: Terry McAulay
- TV announcers (CBS): Jim Nantz, Phil Simms, and Bonnie Bernstein
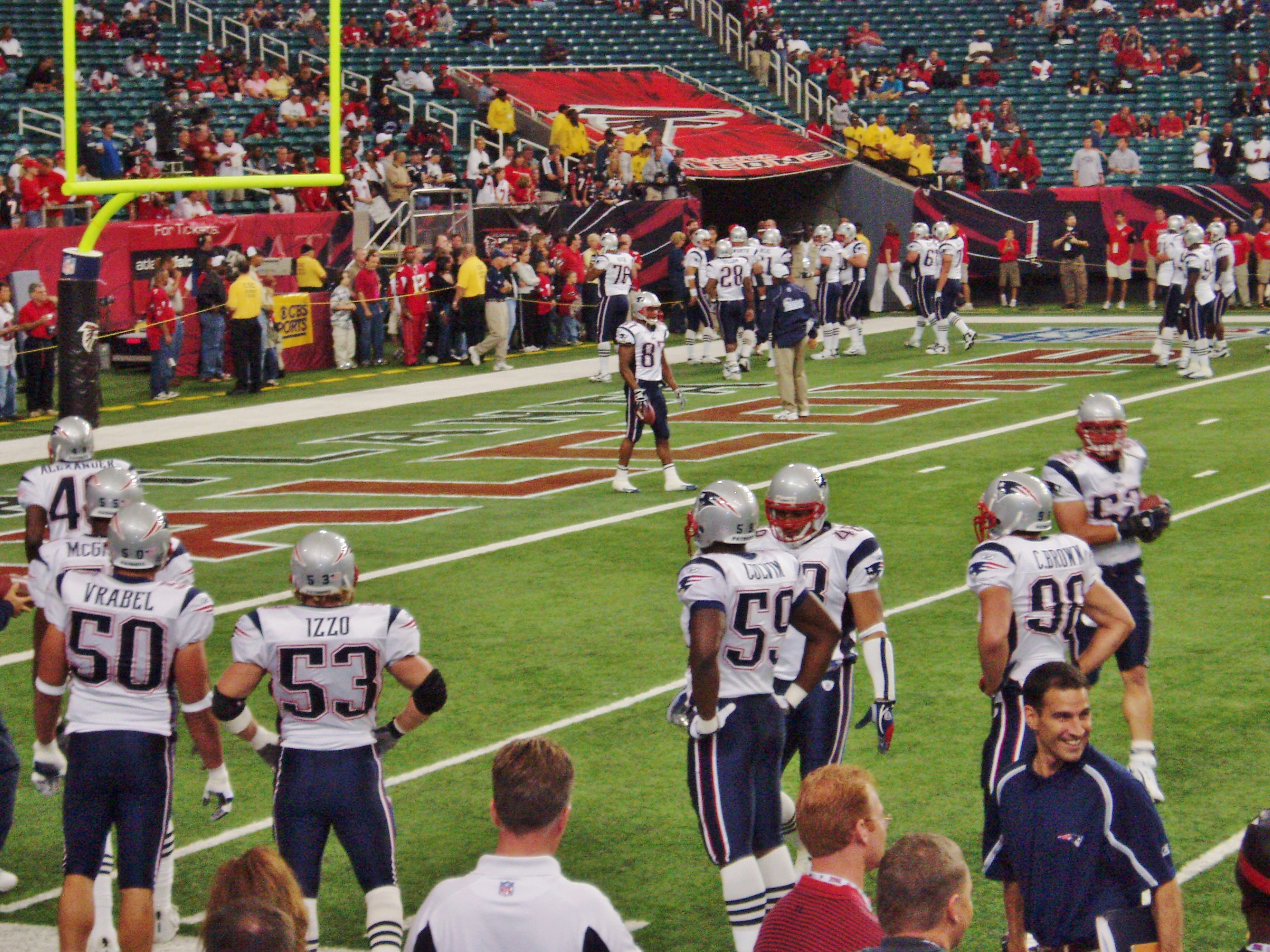
David Givens and Tully Banta-Cain, week 5

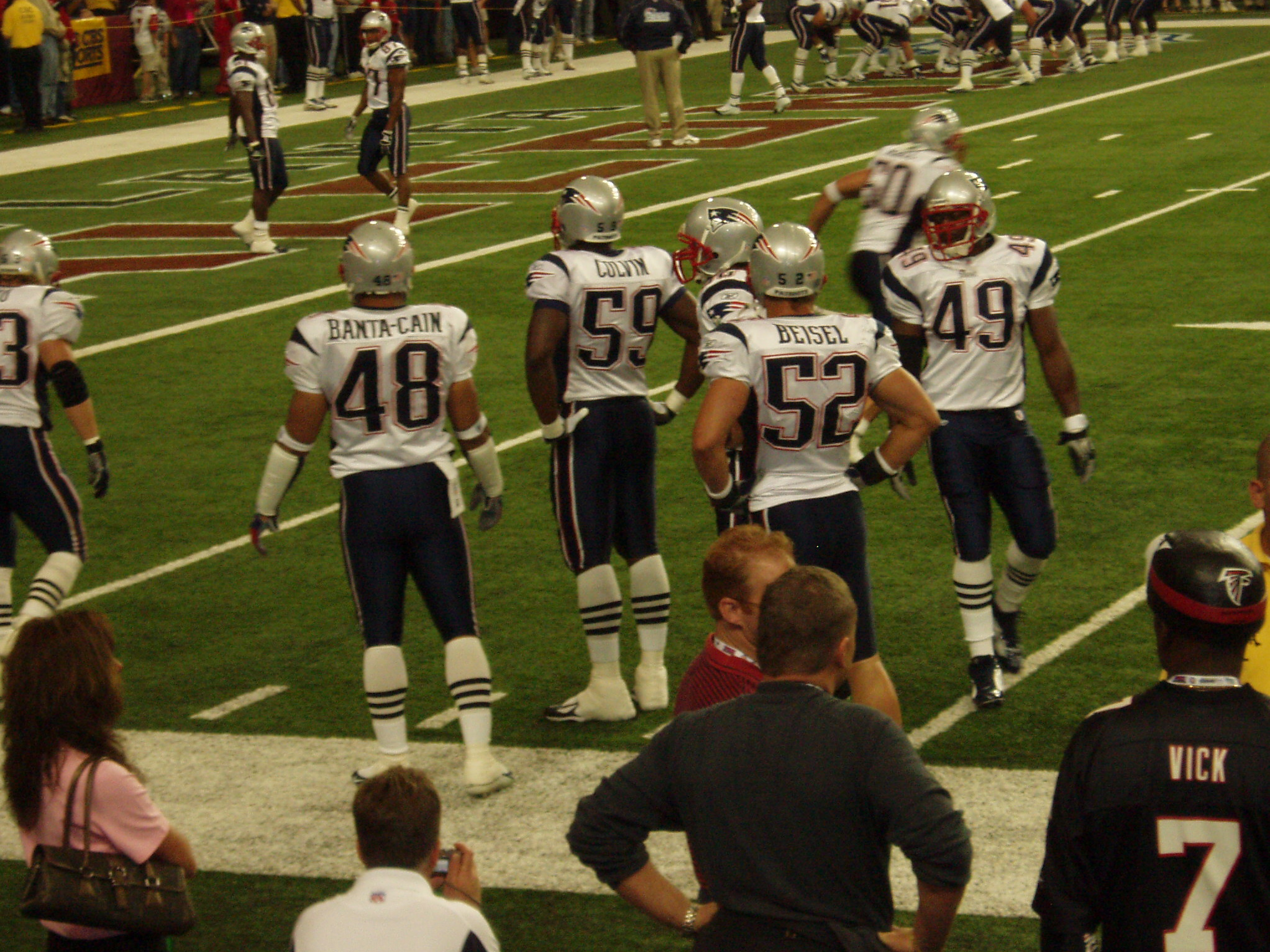
Eric Alexander, week 5

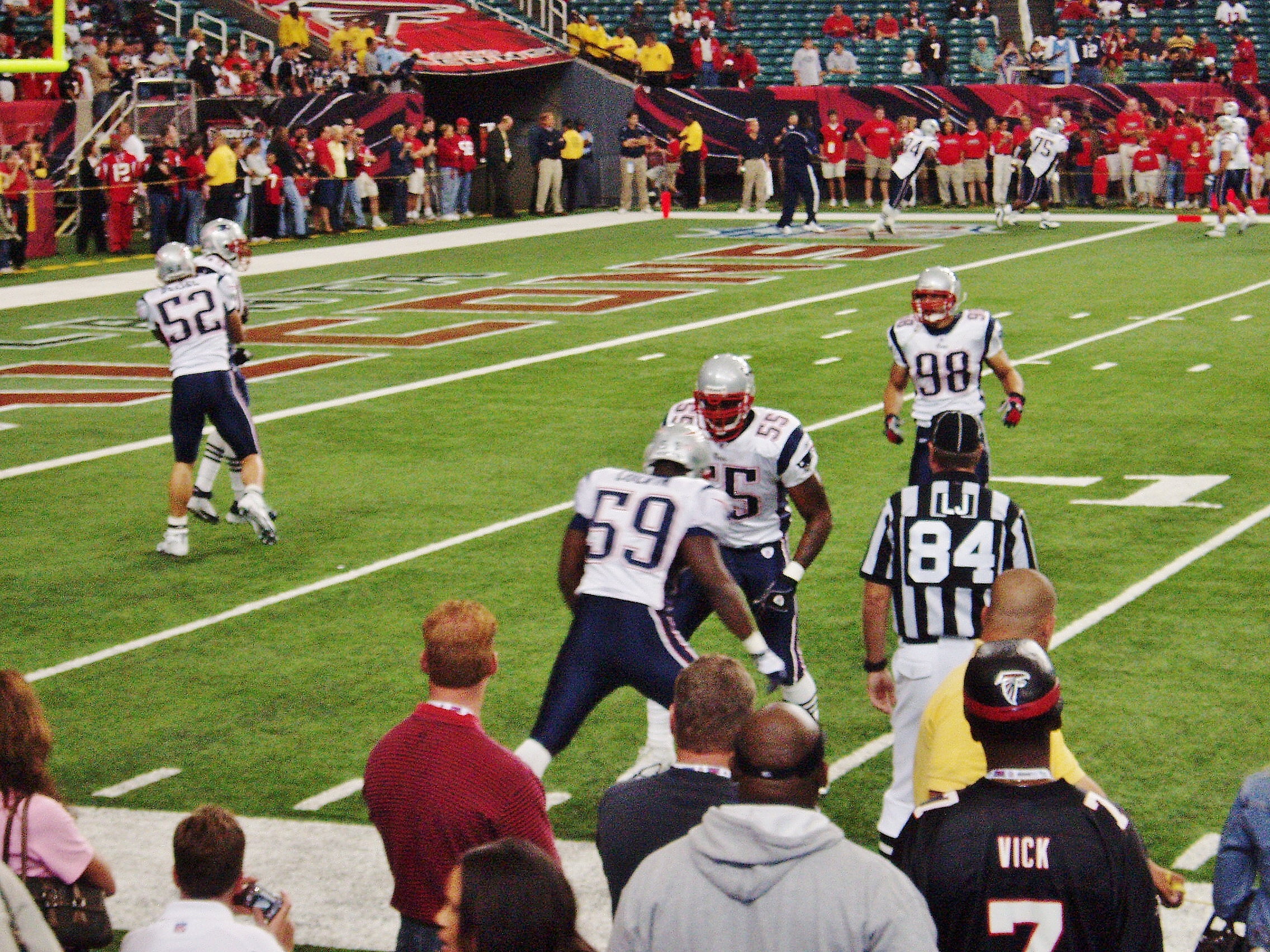
Willie McGinest and Rosevelt Colvin, week 5

=== Week 6 ===
| Team | 1 | 2 | 3 | 4 | Total |
|---|---|---|---|---|---|
| Patriots | 3 | 0 | 3 | 14 | 20 |
| • Broncos | 0 | 21 | 7 | 0 | 28 |

- Date: October 16
- Location: Invesco Field at Mile High, Denver, Colorado
- Game start: 4:15 p.m. EST
- Game attendance: 76,571
- Game weather: Sunny, 75 °F (24 °C)
- Referee: Walt Coleman
- TV announcers (CBS): Jim Nantz, Phil Simms, and Bonnie Bernstein

The loss meant the Patriots would win less than 14 games for the first time since 2002.

=== Week 8 ===
| Team | 1 | 2 | 3 | 4 | Total |
|---|---|---|---|---|---|
| Bills | 0 | 3 | 7 | 6 | 16 |
| • Patriots | 0 | 0 | 7 | 14 | 21 |

- Date: October 30
- Location: Gillette Stadium, Foxborough, Massachusetts
- Game start: 8:30 p.m. EST
- Game attendance: 68,756
- Game weather: Clear, 58 °F (14 °C)
- Referee: Ron Winter
- TV announcers (ESPN): Mike Patrick, Joe Theismann, Paul Maguire and Suzy Kolber

This game marked the return of Tedy Bruschi, who had sat out the whole season due to a stroke suffered in February (see above)

=== Week 9 ===
| Team | 1 | 2 | 3 | 4 | Total |
|---|---|---|---|---|---|
| • Colts | 7 | 14 | 10 | 9 | 40 |
| Patriots | 7 | 0 | 7 | 7 | 21 |

- Date: November 7
- Location: Gillette Stadium, Foxborough, Massachusetts
- Game start: 9:00 p.m. EST
- Game attendance: 68,756
- Game weather: Clear, 51 °F (11 °C)
- Referee: Bernie Kukar
- TV announcers (ABC): Al Michaels, John Madden, and Sam Ryan

The undefeated Colts and quarterback Peyton Manning traveled to Foxboro looking for their first win there since 1995. In the spotlight of Monday Night Football, the Patriots defense proved unable to control the Colts offense as they had done in a 20–3 showing in the last matchup between the two teams; Manning and Marvin Harrison connected on a 48-yard catch on the game's second play, which was followed by a 1-yard touchdown grab by Harrison. Tom Brady and the Patriots responded by mounting a long drive that ended in a 16-yard touchdown catch by Deion Branch. The Patriots defense though, proved ineffective at stopping the Colts on third down, giving up a 17-play drive that ended in a 2-yard touchdown run by Edgerrin James. On their next drive, a Mike Vrabel interception of Manning gave the Patriots good field position, only to be squandered by a Corey Dillon fumble at the Colts' 18-yard line. To close the first half, Manning led the Colts on another scoring drive, connecting with Reggie Wayne on a 10-yard touchdown pass. The Colts' offense continued to dominate in the second half, taking a 28–7 lead after Dominic Rhodes ended an 11-play drive with a 4-yard touchdown run. Brady responded with a 31-yard touchdown pass to Daniel Graham, but the Colts' offense kept scoring, adding two Mike Vanderjagt field goals into the fourth quarter; the first came after the Patriots unsuccessfully tried to catch the Colts off-guard with an on-side kick. Down 20 points, Brady mounted another scoring drive, this time hitting Troy Brown on a 19-yard touchdown strike to cut the Colts' lead to 34–21. The Colts would come right back to crush the Patriots' hopes of a comeback, with Manning hitting Harrison on a 30-yard touchdown pass. Veteran Doug Flutie replaced Brady in the game's final minutes as the Colts came out of Foxboro with a decisive 40–21 victory.

=== Week 10 ===
| Team | 1 | 2 | 3 | 4 | Total |
|---|---|---|---|---|---|
| • Patriots | 0 | 3 | 9 | 11 | 23 |
| Dolphins | 0 | 7 | 0 | 9 | 16 |

- Date: November 13
- Location: Dolphins Stadium, Miami Gardens, Florida
- Game start: 1:00 p.m. EST
- Game attendance: 73,405
- Game weather: Mostly cloudy, 82 °F (28 °C)
- Referee: Mike Carey
- TV announcers (Jim Nantz, Phil Simms, and Bonnie Bernstein): CBS

=== Week 11 ===
| Team | 1 | 2 | 3 | 4 | Total |
|---|---|---|---|---|---|
| Saints | 0 | 7 | 0 | 10 | 17 |
| • Patriots | 7 | 7 | 7 | 3 | 24 |

- Date: November 20
- Location: Gillette Stadium, Foxborough, Massachusetts
- Game start: 1:00 p.m. EST
- Game attendance: 68,756
- Game weather: Sunny, 51 °F (11 °C)
- Referee: Gerald Austin
- TV announcers (Fox): Ron Pitts, Tim Ryan, and Butch Stearns

=== Week 12 ===
| Team | 1 | 2 | 3 | 4 | Total |
|---|---|---|---|---|---|
| Patriots | 0 | 3 | 7 | 6 | 16 |
| • Chiefs | 7 | 12 | 7 | 0 | 26 |

- Date: November 27
- Location: Arrowhead Stadium, Kansas City, Missouri
- Game start: 1:00 p.m. EST
- Game attendance: 78,025
- Game weather: Overcast, 58 °F (14 °C)
- Referee: Bill Vinovich
- TV announcers (CBS): Dick Enberg, Rich Gannon, and Armen Keteyian

This was the first Patriots game for Bill Belichick after the death of his father, Steve Belichick, former fullback, college coach, and long-time scout at the U.S. Naval Academy.

=== Week 13 ===
| Team | 1 | 2 | 3 | 4 | Total |
|---|---|---|---|---|---|
| Jets | 0 | 3 | 0 | 0 | 3 |
| • Patriots | 0 | 6 | 7 | 3 | 16 |

- Date: December 4
- Location: Gillette Stadium, Foxborough, Massachusetts
- Game start: 4:15 p.m. EST
- Game attendance: 68,756
- Game weather: Light snow, 26 °F (−3 °C)
- Referee: Jeff Triplette
- TV announcers (CBS): Kevin Harlan, Randy Cross

Brady was held without a touchdown pass for the third time in the previous two seasons and Adam Vinatieri surpassed Gino Cappelletti as the Patriots' all-time leader in points. Vinatieri would finish his Patriots career with 1,158 and remained the franchise's all-time points leader until his successor, Stephen Gostkowski, surpassed him in Week 15 of the Patriots' 2014 championship season.

=== Week 14 ===
| Team | 1 | 2 | 3 | 4 | Total |
|---|---|---|---|---|---|
| • Patriots | 7 | 7 | 7 | 14 | 35 |
| Bills | 0 | 0 | 0 | 7 | 7 |

- Date: December 11
- Location: Ralph Wilson Stadium, Orchard Park, New York
- Game start: 1:00 p.m. EST
- Game attendance: 71,810
- Game weather: Light snow, 30 °F (−1 °C)
- Referee: Bill Carollo
- TV announcers (CBS): Kevin Harlan, Randy Cross

=== Week 15 ===
| Team | 1 | 2 | 3 | 4 | Total |
|---|---|---|---|---|---|
| Buccaneers | 0 | 0 | 0 | 0 | 0 |
| • Patriots | 7 | 14 | 0 | 7 | 28 |

- Date: December 17
- Location: Gillette Stadium, Foxborough, Massachusetts
- Game start: 1:30 p.m. EST
- Game attendance: 68,756
- Game weather: Sunny, 38 °F (3 °C)
- Referee: Scott Green
- TV announcers (Fox): Dick Stockton, Daryl Johnston, Tony Siragusa

=== Week 16 ===
| Team | 1 | 2 | 3 | 4 | Total |
|---|---|---|---|---|---|
| • Patriots | 7 | 14 | 7 | 3 | 31 |
| Jets | 7 | 0 | 0 | 14 | 21 |

- Date: December 26
- Location: Giants Stadium, East Rutherford, New Jersey
- Game start: 9:00 p.m. EST
- Game attendance: 77,569
- Game weather: Overcast, 41 °F (5 °C)
- Referee: Ed Hochuli
- TV announcers (ABC): Al Michaels, John Madden, and Sam Ryan

=== Week 17 ===
| Team | 1 | 2 | 3 | 4 | Total |
|---|---|---|---|---|---|
| • Dolphins | 7 | 6 | 5 | 10 | 28 |
| Patriots | 7 | 3 | 3 | 13 | 26 |

- Date: January 1
- Location: Gillette Stadium, Foxborough, Massachusetts
- Game start: 1:00 p.m. EST
- Game attendance: 68,756
- Game weather: Cloudy, 25 °F (−4 °C)
- Referee: Tom White
- TV announcers (CBS): Kevin Harlan, Randy Cross

Backup quarterback Doug Flutie converted a drop kick for an extra point for the first time since the 1941 NFL Championship Game.

== Standings ==
AFC East
| | W | L | T | PCT | DIV | CONF | PF | PA | STK |
|---|---|---|---|---|---|---|---|---|---|
| ^{(4)} New England Patriots | 10 | 6 | 0 | .625 | 5–1 | 7–5 | 379 | 338 | L1 |
| Miami Dolphins | 9 | 7 | 0 | .563 | 3–3 | 7–5 | 318 | 317 | W6 |
| Buffalo Bills | 5 | 11 | 0 | .313 | 2–4 | 5–7 | 271 | 367 | L1 |
| New York Jets | 4 | 12 | 0 | .250 | 2–4 | 3–9 | 240 | 355 | W1 |

=== Standings breakdown ===
| | W | L | T | Pct. | PF | PA |
| Home | 5 | 3 | 0 | .625 | 183 | 165 |
| Away | 5 | 3 | 0 | .625 | 196 | 173 |
| AFC East Opponents | 5 | 1 | 0 | .833 | 152 | 101 |
| AFC Opponents | 7 | 5 | 0 | .583 | 279 | 276 |
| NFC Opponents | 3 | 1 | 0 | .750 | 100 | 72 |
By Stadium Type
| Indoors | 1 | 0 | 0 | 1.000 | 31 | 28 |
| Outdoors | 9 | 6 | 0 | .600 | 348 | 310 |

== Postseason results ==
=== Wild Card ===
| Team | 1 | 2 | 3 | 4 | Total |
|---|---|---|---|---|---|
| Jaguars | 0 | 3 | 0 | 0 | 3 |
| • Patriots | 0 | 7 | 14 | 7 | 28 |

- Date: January 7
- Location: Gillette Stadium, Foxborough, Massachusetts
- Game start: 8:00 p.m. EST
- Game attendance: 68,756
- Game weather: Clear, 24 °F (−4 °C)
- Referee: Walt Anderson
- TV announcers (ABC): Al Michaels, John Madden, and Michele Tafoya

Scoring summary
| 2 | 12:08 | NE | Troy Brown 11-yard pass from Tom Brady (Adam Vinatieri kick) | Patriots 7–0 |
| 2 | 1:05 | JAC | Josh Scobee 36-yard field goal | Patriots 7–3 |
| 3 | 7:13 | NE | David Givens 3-yard pass from Tom Brady (Adam Vinatieri kick) | Patriots 14–3 |
| 3 | 3:03 | NE | Benjamin Watson 63-yard pass from Tom Brady (Adam Vinatieri kick) | Patriots 21–3 |
| 4 | 14:46 | NE | Asante Samuel 73-yard interception return (Adam Vinatieri kick) | Patriots 28–3 |

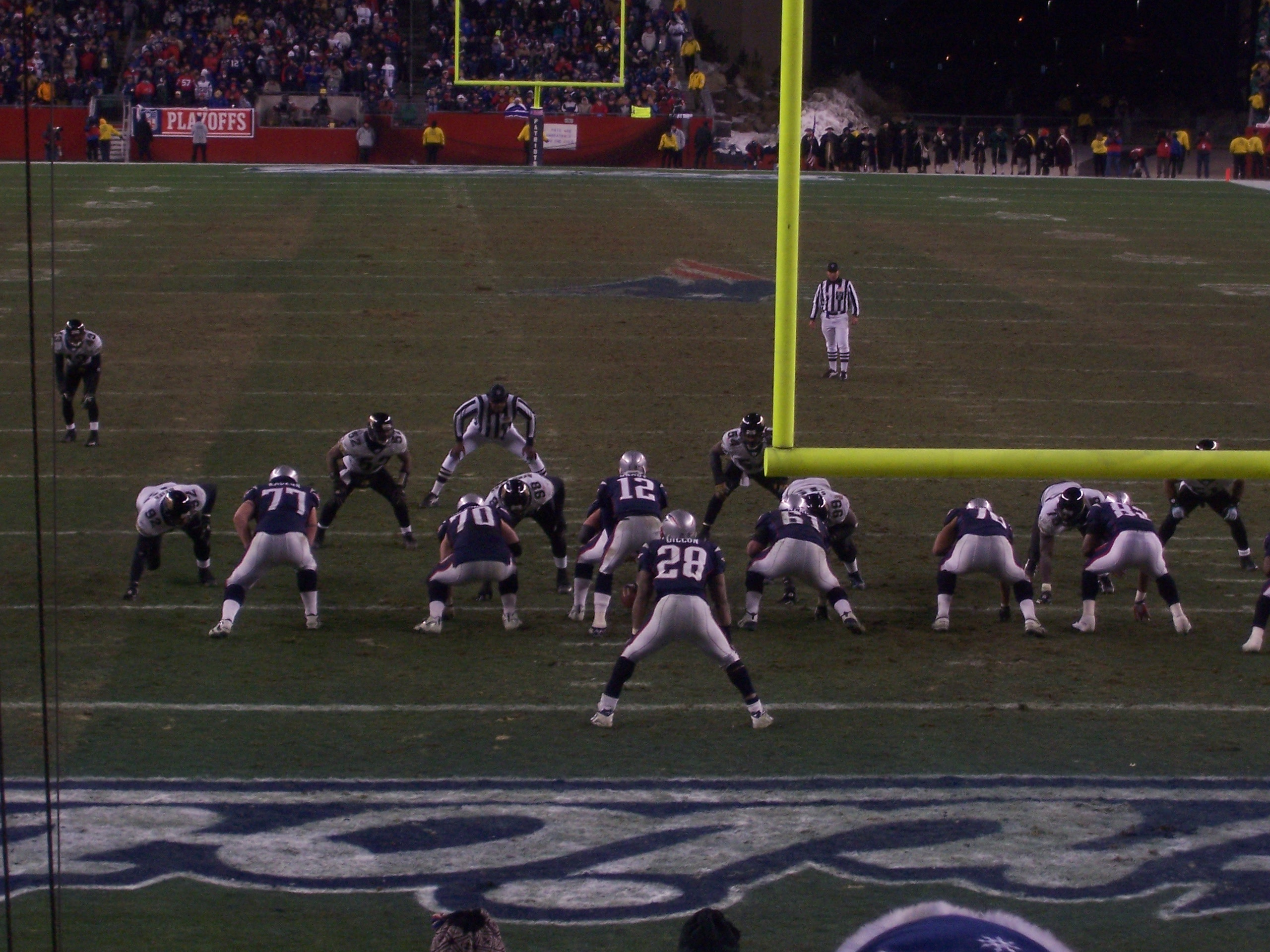
The Patriots' offense on the field

The three-time Super Bowl champion Patriots, who for the first time in four playoff trips would have to win three games to advance to the Super Bowl, defeated the Jaguars 28–3. Linebacker Willie McGinest set NFL playoff records for sacks in a game (4.5, 1 sack ahead of the old record held by Richard Dent and Rich Milot) and career postseason sacks (16, two ahead of the old record held by Bruce Smith), while quarterback Tom Brady threw for 201 yards and three touchdown passes.

In the first half, the Jaguars recorded four sacks and held New England to 126 yards, while the Patriots defense recorded two sacks, gave up only 115 yards, and didn't allow a first down until 9:40 remained in the second period. Neither team could score in the first quarter, but early in the second, New England receiver Tim Dwight returned Chris Hanson's 46-yard punt 27 yards to the Jaguars' 37-yard line. Two 4-yard runs by Corey Dillon and an 18-yard burst from Kevin Faulk then moved the ball to the 11-yard line, and Brady capped off the drive with an 11-yard touchdown pass to Troy Brown. On Jacksonville's ensuing possession, Jimmy Smith's 19-yard reception his team a first down for the first time in the game and moved the ball to the Patriots' 44-yard line. But on the next play, a tackle from safety Eugene Wilson caused Alvin Pearman to fumble the ball, and defensive lineman Richard Seymour recovered it. However, the Patriots could not take advantage of the turnover; Jacksonville managed to force a punt and then drove into scoring range for the first time in the game. Quarterback Byron Leftwich completed five passes for 59 yards on the drive, and Josh Scobee finished it with a 36-yard field goal, cutting their deficit to 7–3. After the kickoff, Faulk's 21-yard reception moved the ball to midfield and gave the Patriots a chance to increase their lead before halftime, but receiver Deion Branch dropped a pass from Brady at the Jaguars' 10-yard line with 19 seconds left.

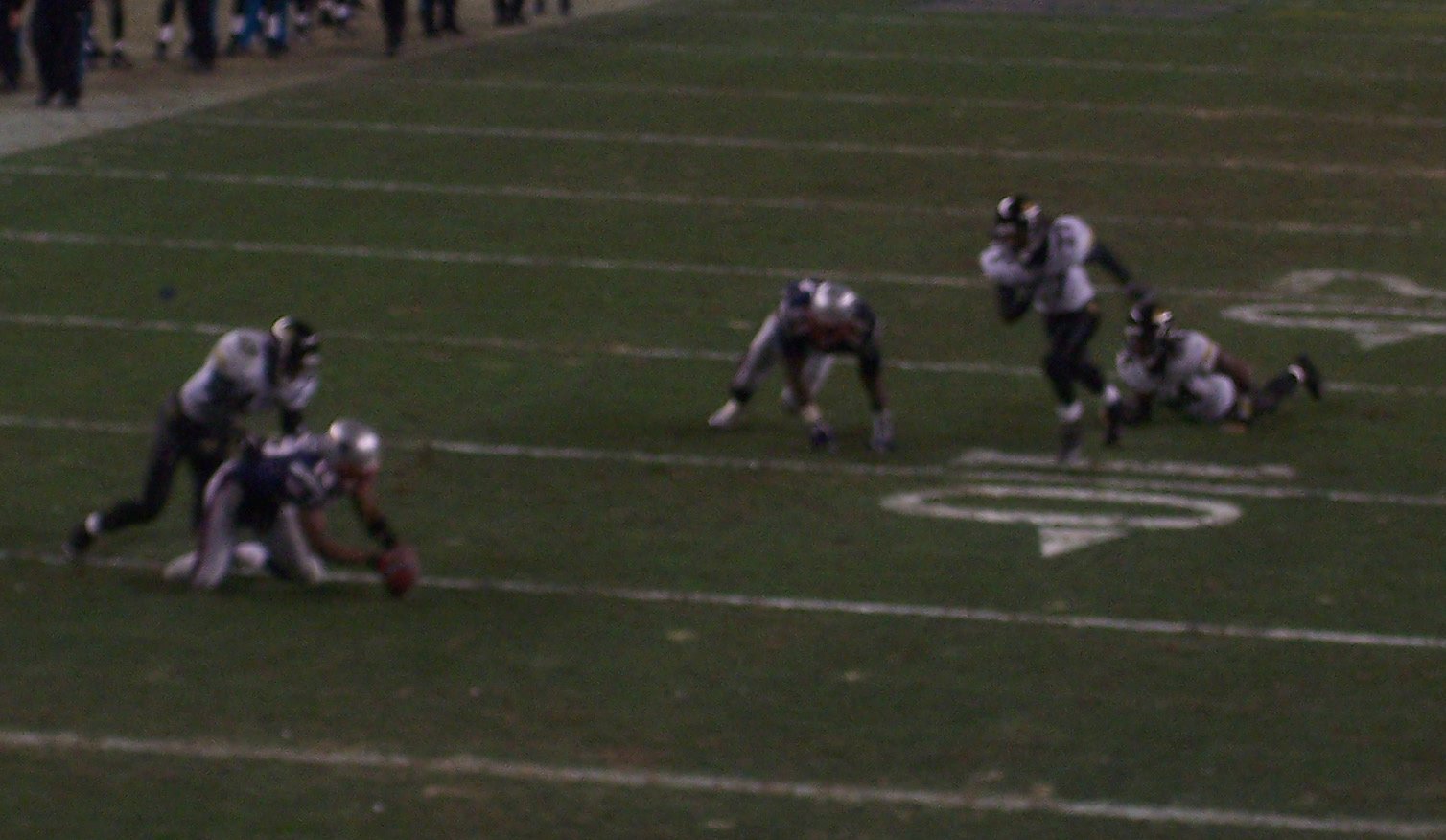
André Davis (left) recovers a Benjamin Watson fumble

After forcing Jacksonville to punt on the opening drive of the second half, Brady led the Patriots 81 yards in 12 plays. On the 11th play, they nearly turned the ball over when tight end Benjamin Watson fumbled the ball on the Jaguars' 5-yard line, but receiver André Davis recovered the ball, and Brady threw a 3-yard touchdown pass to David Givens on the next play. Then after forcing a punt, Brady threw a short pass to Watson who broke several tackles en route to a 63-yard score, increasing New England's lead to 21–3. After the kickoff, Leftwich led his team to the Patriots' 32-yard line, but on the first play of the fourth quarter, defensive back Asante Samuel intercepted Leftwich's pass and took off for a 73-yard touchdown return, making the score 28–3. After that, Jacksonville mounted two more drives, but could not come away with any points. First they drove to the Patriots' 8-yard line. But on third down and 2, McGinest sacked Leftwich for a 15-yard loss and Scobee missed a 41-yard field goal attempt on the next play. Then after forcing a punt, they drove to the Patriots' 6-yard line, but ended up turning the ball over downs with 5 minutes left in the game.

This game also marked three career playoff records: Brady and Patriots head coach Bill Belichick set records for 10 straight postseason victories, eclipsing Vince Lombardi's run with the Green Bay Packers in the 1960s.

=== Divisional ===
| Team | 1 | 2 | 3 | 4 | Total |
|---|---|---|---|---|---|
| Patriots | 0 | 3 | 3 | 7 | 13 |
| • Broncos | 0 | 10 | 7 | 10 | 27 |

- Date: January 14
- Location: Invesco Field at Mile High, Denver, Colorado
- Game start: 8:00 p.m. EST
- Game attendance: 76,238
- Game weather: Clear, 51 °F (11 °C)
- Referee: Jeff Triplette
- TV announcers (CBS): Jim Nantz, Phil Simms, and Bonnie Bernstein

Scoring summary
| 2 | 3:48 | NE | Adam Vinatieri 40-yard field goal | Patriots 3–0 |
| 2 | 1:42 | DEN | Mike Anderson 1-yard run (Jason Elam kick) | Broncos 7–3 |
| 2 | :43 | DEN | Jason Elam 50-yard field goal | Broncos 10–3 |
| 3 | 7:49 | NE | Adam Vinatieri 32-yard field goal | Broncos 10–6 |
| 3 | :43 | DEN | Mike Anderson 1-yard run (Jason Elam kick) | Broncos 17–6 |
| 4 | 8:38 | DEN | Rod Smith 4-yard pass from Jake Plummer (Jason Elam kick) | Broncos 24–6 |
| 4 | 8:05 | NE | David Givens 4-yard pass from Tom Brady (Adam Vinatieri kick) | Broncos 24–13 |
| 4 | 3:20 | DEN | Jason Elam 34-yard field goal | Broncos 27–13 |

The Broncos converted four out of five turnovers into 24 points as they eliminated the two-time defending Super Bowl champion Patriots, 27–13, and won their first playoff game since defeating the Atlanta Falcons in Super Bowl XXXIII. This game also ended New England's league-record ten-game postseason winning streak and gave quarterback Tom Brady his first ever postseason loss.

Early in the second quarter, the Broncos drove to the Patriots' 3-yard line, only to turn the ball over on downs after failing to convert a fourth down and 1 on New England's 3-yard line. Then after forcing a punt, Broncos quarterback Jake Plummer threw a pass that was intercepted by Asante Samuel. On the next play, Patriots quarterback Tom Brady threw a 51-yard completion to André Davis, setting up Adam Vinatieri's 40-yard field goal to give New England a 3–0 lead.

With New England leading 3–0 with less than two minutes left in the first half, Broncos linebacker Ian Gold recovered a fumble from Kevin Faulk on the Patriots' 40-yard line. After that, a pass interference penalty on Samuel moved the ball to the 1-yard line, and then Mike Anderson scored a 1-yard touchdown run on the next play. On the ensuing kickoff, Ellis Hobbs fumbled that and kicker Todd Sauerbrun recovered the ball on the Patriots' 39-yard line, setting up kicker Jason Elam's 50-yard field goal to give Denver a 10–3 halftime lead.

Early in the third quarter, the Patriots drove 58 yards in 11 plays and scored with a 32-yard field goal from Vinatieri, cutting their deficit to 10–6. With less than a minute to go in the third quarter, New England reached the Denver 5-yard line. However, Brady was intercepted for the first time in the playoffs since Super Bowl XXXVIII. The interception was returned by Champ Bailey for 101 yards before New England tight end Benjamin Watson knocked the ball out of bounds at the New England 1-yard line. The Patriots challenged whether the ball was actually knocked through and out of the end zone (which would have been a touchback and given the Patriots the ball at their own 20-yard line), but the original call stood. Mike Anderson then ran for another one-yard touchdown on the next play to increase Denver's lead, 17–6. Then on New England's next drive, the usually accurate Vinatieri missed a 42-yard field goal, his first in 21 field goal attempts in the playoffs. Later in the fourth quarter, Troy Brown muffed a Denver punt and the Broncos recovered it on New England's 15-yard line, setting up Rod Smith's four-yard touchdown pass from Plummer.

With 8:33 left in the game, Brady completed a 73-yard pass to Deion Branch and then followed it up with a 4-yard touchdown pass to David Givens, cutting the score to 24–13. But on the Broncos' ensuing possession, Plummer's 42-yard completion to Smith set up another Elam field goal. Denver then all but clinched the game when safety John Lynch intercepted a Brady pass with less than 3 minutes remaining.

Brady finished the game completing 20 out of 36 passes for 341 yards, one touchdown, and two interceptions, but lost his first NFL postseason game. Also, Patriots head coach Bill Belichick lost his first postseason game since taking over the team in 2000, as both the coach and his quarterback had compiled 10 straight playoff wins before this (the trio of 3–0 runs to Super Bowl titles and the previous win over Jacksonville). Branch caught 8 passes for 153 yards, while Rod Smith caught 6 passes for 96 yards and a touchdown. This would become the Patriots' first postseason loss since 1998 when the team lost to the Jaguars in the wild card round.

== Final roster ==
New England Patriots 2005 final roster
| Quarterbacks: 12 Tom Brady; 16 Matt Cassel ^{R}; 2 Doug Flutie; Running backs: 28 Corey Dillon; 44 Heath Evans FB; 33 Kevin Faulk; 35 Patrick Pass FB; Wide receivers: 83 Deion Branch; 80 Troy Brown; 13 Bam Childress ^{UR}; 18 André Davis; 86 Tim Dwight; 87 David Givens; 81 Bethel Johnson; Tight ends: 88 Christian Fauria; 82 Daniel Graham; 84 Ben Watson | Offensive linemen: 68 Tom Ashworth OT; 76 Brandon Gorin OT; 71 Russ Hochstein C; 77 Nick Kaczur OT ^{R}; 70 Logan Mankins G ^{R}; 64 Gene Mruczkowski C; 61 Stephen Neal G; 69 Ross Tucker G/OT; 74 Billy Yates G; Defensive linemen: 97 Jarvis Green DE; 91 Marquise Hill DE; 90 Dan Klecko NT; 93 Richard Seymour DE; 92 Santonio Thomas DE ^{UR}; 94 Ty Warren DE; 75 Vince Wilfork NT | Linebackers: 95 Tully Banta-Cain OLB; 52 Monty Beisel ILB; 98 Chad Brown ILB; 54 Tedy Bruschi ILB; 58 Matt Chatham OLB; 59 Rosevelt Colvin OLB; 51 Don DavisOLB; 53 Larry Izzo ILB; 55 Willie McGinest OLB; 50 Mike Vrabel OLB; Defensive backs: 25 Artrell Hawkins SS; 27 Ellis Hobbs CB ^{R}; 32 Hank Poteat CB; 22 Asante Samuel CB; 36 James Sanders SS ^{R}; 24 Michael Stone SS; 26 Eugene Wilson FS; Special teams: 8 Josh Miller P; 66 Lonie Paxton LS; 4 Adam Vinatieri K | Reserve lists: 47 Ryan Claridge LB (IR) ^{R}; 21 Randall Gay CB (IR); 37 Rodney Harrison S (IR); 18 Cedric James WR (IR); 67 Dan Koppen C (IR); 72 Matt Light OT (IR); 15 Michael McGrew WR (IR) ^{UR}; 38 Tyrone Poole CB (IR); 30 Chad Scott CB (IR); 29 Guss Scott S (IR); 23 Duane Starks CB (IR); 99 Mike Wright DE (IR) ^{UR}; Practice squad: 49 Eric Alexander ILB; 65 Wesley Britt OT ^{R}; 60 Ryan Krug G ^{UR}; 14 P. K. Sam WR; 23 Antwain Spann CB; 41 Raymond Ventrone S ^{UR}; Notations: R: 2005 Rookie; UR: 2005 Undrafted Rookie; Italicized players are not on the 53-man roster.; 53 active, 11 inactive, 6 practice squad |

== Awards and honors ==
Numerous players were the recipients of awards for their performances in the 2005 regular season:

| Recipient | Award(s) |
|---|---|
| Tom Brady | Week 5: AFC Offensive Player of the Week; 2005 Sports Illustrated Sportsman of the Year |
| Tedy Bruschi | Week 8: AFC Defensive Player of the Week; 2005 New England Patriots Ed Block Courage Award; 2005 Co-NFL Comeback Player of the Year |
| Doug Flutie | Week 17: AFC Special Teams Player of the Week |
| Matt Light | 2005 New England Patriots Ron Burton Community Service Award |
| Willie McGinest | 2005 New England Patriots 12th Player Award |
| Adam Vinatieri | Week 3: AFC Special Teams Player of the Week |

=== Pro Bowl selections ===
Patriots quarterback Tom Brady and defensive end Richard Seymour were both named to the AFC team in the 2006 Pro Bowl. Neither participated in the game due to injuries.

== Records ==
- With his 10-point performance in the Patriots' Week 13 win over the New York Jets, kicker Adam Vinatieri became the Patriots' all-time leading scorer, breaking Gino Cappelletti's mark of 1,130 points.
