= Bobby Iwuchukwu =

American football player (born 1983)

Profile
- Position: Linebacker

Personal information
- Born: August 1, 1983 (age 43); Arlington, Texas
- Listed height: 6 ft 2 in (1.88 m)
- Listed weight: 245 lb (111 kg)

Career information
- High school: Arlington (TX) James Martin
- College: Purdue
- NFL draft: 2006: undrafted

Career history
- New Orleans Saints (2006)*; San Francisco 49ers (2006)*; Baltimore Ravens (2006)*; Miami Dolphins (2007)*
- * Offseason or practice squad member only

Robert Chukuma Iwuchukwu // (born August 1, 1983) is an American former football linebacker. He was originally signed by the New Orleans Saints in 2006. He played collegiately at Purdue.

== Early life ==
Iwuchukwu was ranked the No. 94 overall in Southwest by Prep Football Report and was a two-year letterman at James Martin High School in Arlington, Texas. He was limited to five games as senior due to high ankle sprain.

Iwuchukwu also participated in track and field, was a National Merit Scholar, a two-year selection to Who's Who of America's High School Athletics, and recipient of UTA Summer Science Institute Award for Excellence in Physics.

== College career ==
After being redshirted in 2001, Iwuchukwu appeared in all 13 games as reserve and on special teams in 2002. He had four solo tackles, including one for loss, and led the team with three blocked kicks. He blocked a field goal at Notre Dame, an extra point at Michigan State and another field goal against Washington in the Sun Bowl.

Iwuchukwu appeared in all 13 games as reserve and on special teams in 2003, amassing 14 tackles (8 solo, 6 assists) and a blocked kick. He blocked a 41-yard field goal attempt by Mike Nugent at Ohio State as time expired to send game into overtime. Iwuchukwu also had three tackles (1 solo, 2 assists) in that game. He recorded a season-high five tackles (all solo) against Georgia in the Capital One Bowl after replacing the injured Gilbert Gardner.

In 2004, Iwuchukwu received the team's Most Improved Award for his defensive play in the spring. He started first eight games before suffering season-ending knee injury, yet ranked second on team with two blocked kicks. He also had 40 tackles (20 solo, 20 assists), including four for loss and 0.5 sacks, with one pass breakup and one fumble recovered. In a game against Illinois, he had a career-high 13 tackles (6 solo, 7 assists), including career-high tying 1.5 for loss, recovered fumble and blocked field goal. Iwuchukwu also blocked a field goal at Notre Dame.

As a senior in 2005, Iwuchukwu battled injuries and missed four of the team's 12 games. He finished the season with 27 tackles (18 solo), 4.5 tackles for loss, and one sack. He had a season high six tackles against Notre Dame, while his lone sack came against Wisconsin.

Tied for Purdue career lead with five blocked field goals (also Rosevelt Colvin, 1995–98). Iwuchukwu's six blocked kicks overall (also one extra point) are best in school history.

== Professional career ==
At Purdue's Pro Day in March 2006, Iwuchukwu ran the 40-yard dash in 4.49 and 4.51 seconds. He also had a 35-inch vertical jump, 4.30 short shuttle, 11.81 long shuttle, 7.11 three-cone drill and 26 bench presses.

After going undrafted in the 2006 NFL draft, Iwuchukwu signed a contract with the New Orleans Saints as an undrafted free agent on May 1. He was waived by the team on August 2, then signed by the San Francisco 49ers a week later when linebacker Andre Torrey tore his ACL.

Iwuchukwu attended training camp with the 49ers but was released during final cutdowns on September 2. He was added to the team's practice squad the following day, but released some time later. He was subsequently signed to the Ravens practice squad, though was not re-signed after the team's playoff loss to the Indianapolis Colts.

On February 6, 2007, Iwuchukwu signed a future contract with the Miami Dolphins. He was subsequently released on May 1.
