= Chad Brown (linebacker) =

American football player (born 1970)

No. 94, 98
- Position: Linebacker

Personal information
- Born: July 12, 1970 (age 56); Altadena, California, U.S.
- Listed height: 6 ft 2 in (1.88 m)
- Listed weight: 240 lb (109 kg)

Career information
- High school: John Muir (Pasadena, California)
- College: Colorado
- NFL draft: 1993: 2nd round, 44th overall pick

Career history
- Pittsburgh Steelers (1993–1996); Seattle Seahawks (1997–2004); New England Patriots (2005); Pittsburgh Steelers (2006); New England Patriots (2007)

Awards and highlights
- 2× First-team All-Pro (1996, 1998); 3× Pro Bowl (1996, 1998, 1999); PFWA All-Rookie Team (1993); Joe Greene Great Performance Award (1993); Seattle Seahawks 35th Anniversary Team; Seattle Seahawks Top 50 players; National champion (1990); First-team All-Big Eight (1992); Second-team All-Big Eight (1991)

Career NFL statistics
- Tackles: 1,091
- Sacks: 79
- Forced fumbles: 17
- Fumble recoveries: 15
- Interceptions: 6
- Defensive touchdowns: 3
- Stats at Pro Football Reference

Chadwick Everett Brown (born July 12, 1970) is an American former professional football player who was a linebacker in the National Football League (NFL). He played college football for the Colorado Buffaloes. He was selected by the Pittsburgh Steelers in the second round of the 1993 NFL draft.

== Early life and college ==
Born in Altadena, California, Brown graduated from John Muir High School in 1988. At the University of Colorado Boulder, he was a four-year starter for the Buffaloes.

== Professional career ==
Pre-draft measurables
Height	Weight	Arm length	Hand span	40-yard dash	10-yard split	20-yard split	20-yard shuttle	Vertical jump
6 ft 2 1/2 in (1.89 m)	236 lb (107 kg)	32 7/8 in (0.84 m)	10 1/2 in (0.27 m)	4.85 s	1.66 s	2.79 s	4.15 s	33.0 in (0.84 m)

Brown was initially drafted 44th overall by the Pittsburgh Steelers in the second round, and became an important part of the "Blitzburgh" defense. Initially, he played at the inside linebacker position in the 3–4 with Levon Kirkland. He started at right inside linebacker in Super Bowl XXX for the Steelers, a loss to the Dallas Cowboys. He then moved to the outside when Greg Lloyd was lost for the 1996 season due to injury, where he went to his first Pro Bowl after that season. His success would continue with the Seattle Seahawks, going to two more Pro Bowls in the 1990s.

He signed with the Patriots as a replacement for injured inside linebacker Tedy Bruschi in 2005. After several games of what was thought to be subpar performance at his new position, Brown spent most of the rest of the season only on special teams. In September of 2006, after re-signing with the Patriots, Brown was released by the Patriots as one of their final cuts. He then signed with the Steelers and finished the season on their injured reserve.

On July 19, 2007, he re-joined the Patriots but was released on September 1, 2007. On September 11, 2007, the Pats re-signed him, and released him again on October 10, 2007. Brown was re-signed by the Patriots yet again on November 27, 2007, after linebacker Rosevelt Colvin was placed on season-ending injured reserve. He was released on December 27, 2007, before the Patriots became AFC champions for the season in Super Bowl XLII.

== Broadcasting career ==
Since retiring as a player, Brown has worked as a color analyst and sideline reporter for college and NFL football on a variety of networks, including Compass Media Networks, the Pac-12 Network, ESPN3, Westwood One, and NBCSN.

Brown previously hosted a sports-talk radio show in Denver on 104.3 The Fan. He was let go from 104.3 The Fan in September 2023.

== Personal life ==
Since his NFL career began, Brown has also operated a business named Pro Exotics that sells non-venomous snakes. Pro Exotics burned down in 2011.
