= Ellis Hobbs =

American football player (born 1983)

No. 27, 31
- Position: Cornerback / Kickoff returner

Personal information
- Born: May 16, 1983 (age 43); Niagara Falls, New York, U.S.
- Listed height: 5 ft 9 in (1.75 m)
- Listed weight: 195 lb (88 kg)

Career information
- High school: DeSoto (DeSoto, Texas)
- College: Iowa State (2001–2004)
- NFL draft: 2005: 3rd round, 84th overall pick

Career history
- New England Patriots (2005–2008); Philadelphia Eagles (2009–2010)

Awards and highlights
- PFWA All-Rookie Team (2005); New England Patriots All-Dynasty Team; First-team All-Big 12 (2004)

Career NFL statistics
- Total tackles: 225
- Sacks: 2.5
- Forced fumbles: 1
- Interceptions: 10
- Total return yards: 3,739
- Total touchdowns: 4
- Stats at Pro Football Reference

Ellis Hue Hobbs III (born May 16, 1983) is an American former professional football player who was a cornerback for six seasons in the National Football League (NFL). He played college football for Iowa State Cyclones. He was selected by the New England Patriots in the third round of the 2005 NFL draft and played for them from 2005 to 2008. He was traded to the Philadelphia Eagles in April 2009 and played for them from 2009 to 2010, before a neck injury prematurely ended his career.

Hobbs previously shared the NFL record for the longest kickoff return (108 yards) with Randall Cobb and Jacoby Jones, a feat he accomplished on September 9, 2007, in a game against the New York Jets. This record was eclipsed by a 109-yard kickoff return touchdown by Cordarrelle Patterson of the Minnesota Vikings against Green Bay on October 27, 2013.

== Early life ==
Hobbs attended DeSoto High School in DeSoto, Texas, where he was a standout in football and track. In track, he participated on the 4×100 and 4×400 relay teams and the long jump. In football, he starred at running back; he ran for 1,701 yards on 233 carries with 29 touchdowns and caught 18 passes for 265 yards and three touchdowns.

Personal life

Married to Monique Hobbs 2008; 5 kids Evan, Ellis, viviana, Jolie, Shyon

== College career ==
Hobbs was just seven credits short of graduating when he entered the NFL, and in 2009 (four years after leaving college) he completed his degree and graduated from Iowa State University with a bachelor's degree in art and design. A three-year starter at right cornerback, he compiled 209 tackles, two sacks, three fumble recoveries, two forced fumbles, and 29 pass deflections during his tenure. He also found success as a kick returner, gaining 490 yards on 24 career kick returns. He earned All-Big 12 Conference first-team honors as a senior. Hobbs also received the Academic Athlete of the Year Award and was a finalist for Christian Athlete of the Year at Iowa State.

== Professional career ==
Pre-draft measurables
Height	Weight	Arm length	Hand span	40-yard dash	10-yard split	20-yard split	20-yard shuttle	Three-cone drill	Vertical jump	Broad jump	Bench press
5 ft 9 in (1.75 m)	192 lb (87 kg)	30 5/8 in (0.78 m)	9 1/8 in (0.23 m)	4.38 s	1.60 s	2.64 s	4.07 s	6.75 s	42.0 in (1.07 m)	11 ft 1 in (3.38 m)	13 reps
All values from NFL Combine/Pro Day

=== New England Patriots ===
==== 2005–06 seasons ====
Despite limited playing time early in the season, Hobbs made a number of contributions to the Patriots in his rookie season. A string of injuries in the Patriots secondary resulted in Hobbs starting at cornerback the final eight games of the season. Hobbs caught three interceptions and earned 371 yards on 15 kickoff returns (including a crucial 35-yard return in the Patriots' game-winning drive against the Pittsburgh Steelers).

Although Hobbs initially won the starting cornerback job in 2006 opposite Asante Samuel, Hobbs struggled somewhat during his second year in the NFL, in part because of a broken wrist suffered early in the season. Hobbs, who wore a black cast for much of the season, missed a couple of games and lost his job as starter during the second half of the season. Nevertheless, he had two interceptions for the season (one in garbage time against the Vikings, which he returned 70 yards). In addition, filling in for an injured Laurence Maroney at kick returner, he returned a kick against the Miami Dolphins for 51 yards, and returned a kick against the Houston Texans for 93 yards and a touchdown, the first of his career, and the first kickoff return for a touchdown by a Patriot since Bethel Johnson in 2004. For the season, he recorded 47 total tackles, 2 interceptions, and 4 passes defensed. He also recorded 14 total tackles in the Patriots' three playoff games.

Hobbs performed well in the 2006 playoffs, breaking up several potential touchdown passes, including two in the Divisional round against the San Diego Chargers, and one in the AFC Championship Game against the Indianapolis Colts. That play against the Colts was flagged as pass interference, a call that proved controversial. Greg Aiello, NFL vice president of communications, stated it was correctly flagged as pass interference. However, there were also reports that the NFL admitted the call was incorrect, and apologized to Hobbs. Hobbs also returned a kickoff 80 yards in the AFC Championship Game.

==== 2007–08 seasons ====
On September 9, 2007, Hobbs broke the record for the longest kickoff return in NFL history when he ran a Mike Nugent kickoff back 108 yards for a touchdown against the New York Jets at Giants Stadium. At the time, it also tied the record for the longest play in NFL history.

In Week 3, against the Bills, Hobbs recorded his first NFL sack when he brought down J. P. Losman on a blitz; he also forced a fumble, which was recovered by Patriots defensive end Jarvis Green. In Week 10, in the rematch at Buffalo, Hobbs recovered a fumble by Bills running back Dwayne Wright (forced by Patriots safety James Sanders), and returned it for his second return touchdown of the season.

In Week 17 against the New York Giants, Hobbs intercepted a pass by Giants quarterback Eli Manning in the fourth quarter, which ultimately led to the Patriots' go-ahead touchdown in the game that completed New England's perfect 16–0 season. He also intercepted a pass by Chargers quarterback Philip Rivers in the AFC Championship Game.

In Super Bowl XLII, Hobbs intercepted Manning again. This time on a pass that deflected off the hands of New York Giants rookie wide receiver, Steve Smith. However, later in the game, with only 35 seconds left, wide receiver Plaxico Burress beat Hobbs to the left corner of the end zone for what ended up being a game-winning 13-yard touchdown pass.

Hobbs played in the Super Bowl with a torn labrum in his shoulder in addition to the chronic groin pain previously reported. Hobbs had Dr. James Andrews repair the shoulder, which was originally injured in Week 9, on February 12.

In 2008, Hobbs intercepted three passes and set the Patriots single game record for yards on kick returns, with 237 yards in a loss to Miami in Week 3. He also returned his third career touchdown against the Oakland Raiders in Week 15 which once again earned him Special Teams Player of the Week honors. He ended the season leading the AFC, and second in the NFL, in kick return average.

=== Philadelphia Eagles ===
On the second day of the 2009 NFL draft, the Patriots traded Hobbs to the Philadelphia Eagles for two fifth-round selections, which the Patriots traded for fourth- and sixth-round selections; the Patriots ultimately drafted guard Rich Ohrnberger and long snapper Jake Ingram with the picks they received for Hobbs. Hobbs won the starting kick returner job over rookie wide receiver Jeremy Maclin for the 2009 season. On November 11, Hobbs was placed on injured reserve with a neck injury.

Hobbs was re-signed to a one-year contract on March 30, 2010. On April 2, the Eagles traded starting cornerback Sheldon Brown to the Cleveland Browns, with Hobbs now favored to start alongside former Patriots teammate Asante Samuel.

In the early third quarter of the Eagles' November 21, 2010 game against the Giants, Hobbs took a blow to the head from the Giants' Dave Tollefson while returning a kick, and had to be carted off the field. He suffered a disc injury and was placed on injured reserve. He announced his retirement on July 28, 2011.

=== Statistics ===
Regular season

Year	Team	G	GS	Tackles					Interceptions						Fumbles
Year	Team	G	GS	Solo	Ast	Comb	Sck	Sfty	PDef	Int	TD	Yds	Avg	Lng	FF
2005	NE	16	8	35	9	44	0.0	0	9	3	0	8	2.7	8	0
2006	NE	15	9	37	7	44	0.0	0	4	2	0	79	39.5	70	0
2007	NE	16	16	51	12	63	1.0	0	12	1	0	0	0.0	0	1
2008	NE	16	16	39	8	47	1.5	0	11	3	0	4	4.0	0	0
2009	PHI	8	0	8	3	11	0.0	0	0	0	0	0	0.0	0	0
2010	PHI	8	7	12	4	16	0.0	0	0	4	1	0	0.0	0	0
Total		79	56	182	43	225	2.5	0	40	10	0	87	8.7	70	1

Playoffs

Year	Team	G	GS	Tackles					Interceptions						Fumbles
Year	Team	G	GS	Solo	Ast	Comb	Sck	Sfty	PDef	Int	TD	Yds	Avg	Lng	FF
2005	NE	1	1	0	0	0	0	0	0	0	0	0	0.0	0	0
2007	NE	2	2	0	0	0	0	0	0	2	0	20	10.0	23	0
Total		0	0	0	0	0	0	0	0	2	0	20	10.0	23	0

Regular season

Year	Team	G	GS	Punt Return									Kick Return								
Year	Team	G	GS	Ret	RetY	Avg	Lng	TD	20+	40+	FC	Fum	Ret	RetY	Avg	Lng	TD	20+	40+	FC	Fum
2005	NE	16	8	0	0	0.0	0	0	0	0	0	0	15	361	24.1	46	0	13	0	0	0
2006	NE	15	9	0	0	0.0	0	0	0	0	0	0	10	360	36.0	63	0	9	3	0	0
2007	NE	16	16	0	0	0.0	0	0	0	0	0	0	35	911	26.0	108T	1	24	3	0	1
2008	NE	16	16	0	0	0.0	0	0	0	0	0	0	45	1,281	28.5	95T	1	33	7	0	1
2009	PHI	8	0	0	0	0.0	0	0	0	0	0	0	20	481	24.1	63	1	12	1	0	1
2010	PHI	8	7	0	0	0.0	0	0	0	0	0	0	16	345	21.6	46	0	9	1	0	1
Total		79	56	0	0	0.0	0	0	0	0	0	0	141	3,739	26.5	108	3	100	15	0	4

Playoffs

Year	Team	G	GS	Punt Return									Kick Return								
Year	Team	G	GS	Ret	RetY	Avg	Lng	TD	20+	40+	FC	Fum	Ret	RetY	Avg	Lng	TD	20+	40+	FC	Fum
2005	NE	2	2	0	0	0.0	0	0	0	0	0	0	5	125	25.0	32	0	1	0	0	0
2006	NE	3	3	0	0	0.0	0	0	0	0	0	0	10	307	30.7	80	0	1	1	0	0
2007	NE	3	2	0	0	0.0	0	0	0	0	0	0	2	39	19.5	24	0	1	0	0	0
Total		8	7	0	0	0.0	0	0	0	0	0	0	17	471	27.7	80	0	3	1	0	0

Source: NFL.com
