= Brandon Gorin =

American football player (born 1978)

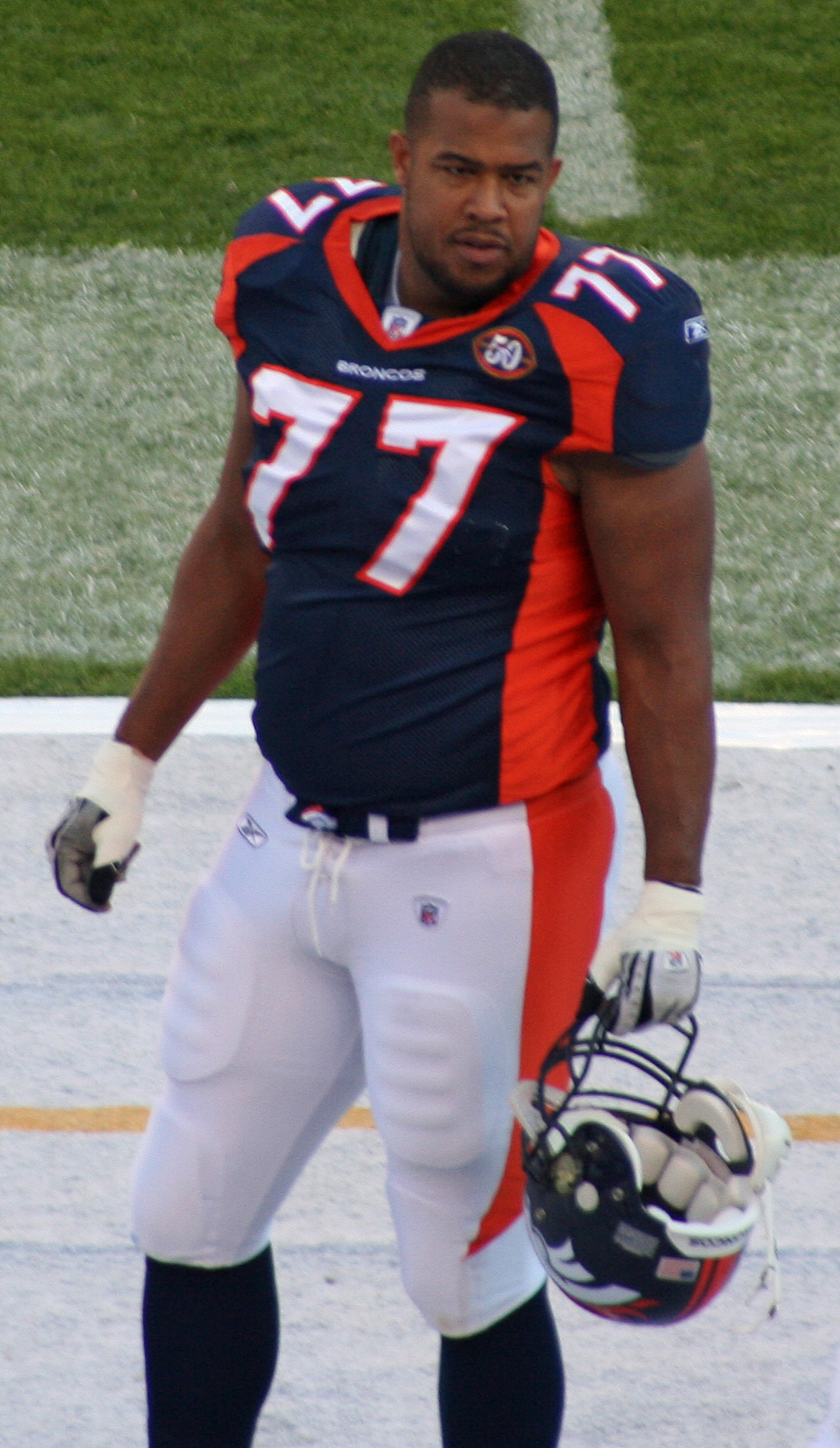
- Gorin with the Denver Broncos in 2009

No. 76, 77
- Position: Offensive tackle

Personal information
- Born: July 17, 1978 (age 48); Muncie, Indiana, U.S.
- Listed height: 6 ft 6 in (1.98 m)
- Listed weight: 308 lb (140 kg)

Career information
- High school: Southside (Muncie)
- College: Purdue
- NFL draft: 2001: 7th round, 201st overall pick

Career history
- San Diego Chargers (2001); New England Patriots (2002–2005); Arizona Cardinals (2006); St. Louis Rams (2007–2008); Denver Broncos (2009)

Awards and highlights
- 2× Super Bowl champion (XXXVIII, XXXIX)

Career NFL statistics
- Games played: 42
- Games started: 26
- Stats at Pro Football Reference

Brandon Michael Gorin (born July 17, 1978) is an American former professional football player who was an offensive tackle in the National Football League (NFL). He was selected by the San Diego Chargers in the seventh round of the 2001 NFL draft. He played college football for the Purdue Boilermakers.

Gorin has also played for the New England Patriots, Arizona Cardinals, St. Louis Rams and Denver Broncos. He earned two Super Bowl rings with the Patriots. Post-football, he appeared in a 2017 episode of HGTV's House Hunters (Season 136, Episode 5), along with his then fiancé', Stephanie.

== Early life ==
Gorin attended school at St. Lawrence Catholic School. Gorin earned first-team all-state honors as a defensive tackle at Muncie Southside High School in Muncie, Indiana, where he was coached by Mike Paul. He played on the school's nationally ranked basketball team, competed in track and field as discus thrower, and earned academic all-state honors. Gorin was named Muncie-Delaware County's 1996 Scholar Athlete of the Year and ranked second in his high school graduating class with 3.8 GPA. He coached a youth basketball league team in Muncie and would like to pursue a career as a college basketball coach when his playing days are over.

== College career ==
Gorin was a three-year starter at Purdue University for the Boilermakers at right tackle, starting on same offensive line as New England Patriots left tackle Matt Light. Patriots linebacker Rosevelt Colvin was also a teammate in 1998. He was shifted to offensive tackle after beginning career on defensive line. Gorin helped the Boilermakers' offense average over 450 yards in his 39 career starts. He started every game at right tackle as a senior as the offensive line surrendered just seven sacks on 473 pass attempts. He earned All-Big Ten Conference Academic honors as a sophomore and earned a degree in industrial engineering.

== Professional career ==
=== San Diego Chargers ===
After being selected by the San Diego Chargers in the seventh round (201st overall) in the 2001 NFL draft, Gorin played for San Diego for two years. During his time as a Charger, he did not play a single snap.

=== New England Patriots ===
On September 5, 2002, he was signed as a free agent by the New England Patriots. He saw limited action in 2003, but became a starter in 2004 after an injury to Tom Ashworth. He went on to win multiple Super Bowls with the New England Patriots.

=== Arizona Cardinals ===
He was traded to the Arizona Cardinals in August 2006 for a conditional 2007 draft pick (sixth-round draft pick), was released a year later by the Cardinals.

=== St. Louis Rams ===
He was signed as a free agent by the St. Louis Rams. On March 7, 2008, Gorin was re-signed as an unrestricted free agent for a one-year contract.

=== Denver Broncos ===
Gorin was signed as an unrestricted free agent by the Denver Broncos on April 17, 2009. The move reunited him with Broncos head coach Josh McDaniels, who served as quarterbacks coach for the Patriots during most of Gorin's time in New England.
