= Nick Kaczur =

Canadian football player (born 1979)

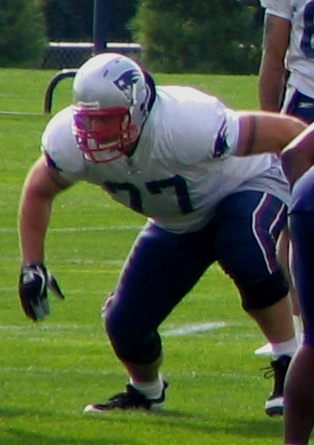
- Kaczur with the New England Patriots in 2007

No. 77
- Position: Offensive tackle

Personal information
- Born: July 28, 1979 (age 47); Brantford, Ontario, Canada
- Listed height: 6 ft 4 in (1.93 m)
- Listed weight: 315 lb (143 kg)

Career information
- High school: Brantford
- College: Toledo
- NFL draft: 2005: 3rd round, 100th overall pick
- CFL draft: 2005: 1st round, 9th overall pick

Career history
- New England Patriots (2005–2010)

Awards and highlights
- New England Patriots All-2000s Team; 3× First-team All-MAC (2002–2004); Second-team All-MAC (2001)

Career NFL statistics
- Games played: 68
- Games started: 62
- Fumble recoveries: 1
- Stats at Pro Football Reference

Nicholas Jesse Kaczur (born July 28, 1979) is a Canadian former professional football player who was an offensive tackle for the New England Patriots of the National Football League (NFL). He played college football for the Toledo Rockets. He was selected by the Patriots in the third round of the 2005 NFL draft.

== Early life ==
While attending Brantford Collegiate Institute in Brantford, Ontario, Kaczur was rated as the best prep lineman in Ontario, was voted his school's Lineman of the Year four times, and was his team's Offensive MVP in his junior and senior years. He also played for the Brantford Bisons of the Ontario Varsity Football League.

== College career ==
After high school, Kaczur worked in construction for two years before attending the University of Toledo in the United States. He was a four-year starter on the offensive line for the Rockets. As a freshman, he was named a third-team freshman All-American by The Sporting News, and was also a second-team All-Mid-American Conference selection. As a sophomore, he won All-MAC first-team honors. He repeated those honors again in 2003 and 2004 as a junior and senior. He started 51 games during his college career and became Toledo's first ever player to earn all-conference honors in four seasons.

== Professional career ==
Pre-draft measurables
Height	Weight	Arm length	Hand span	40-yard dash	10-yard split	20-yard split	20-yard shuttle	Three-cone drill	Vertical jump	Broad jump	Bench press
6 ft 4 1/2 in (1.94 m)	319 lb (145 kg)	32 7/8 in (0.84 m)	10 3/8 in (0.26 m)	5.30 s	1.88 s	3.11 s	4.76 s	7.69 s	31.5 in (0.80 m)	8 ft 7 in (2.62 m)	22 reps
All values from NFL Combine/Pro Day

Kaczur was selected in the third round of the 2005 NFL draft (100th overall) by the New England Patriots. He was also selected by the Toronto Argonauts in the first round of the 2005 CFL draft (9th overall). After beginning the season as a reserve right tackle behind Tom Ashworth, Kaczur started the final 13 games at left tackle for the Patriots in 2005, following an injury to veteran Matt Light. After recovering from an injury that limited him to a reserve role behind Ryan O'Callaghan at right tackle for the first two months of the 2006 season, Kaczur returned to the starting lineup in November and helped the Patriots make a run to the AFC Championship Game against the Indianapolis Colts.

In 2007, Kaczur started the first 15 games of the season, only missing the final game, to an injury. He returned for the Patriots playoff run, including Super Bowl XLII. He returned in 2008 to start 14 games, only missing two games in October due to injury. He was signed to a four-year, $16 million extension on August 24, 2009, four months after the Patriots selected fellow offensive tackle Sebastian Vollmer in the second round of the 2009 NFL draft. Kaczur started the first 13 games of the 2009 season before missing Weeks 16 and 17 with an injury; Vollmer started both games in Kaczur's place, and continued to start in Week 17 and the Wild Card playoffs, limiting Kaczur to a reserve role in both games.

After suffering a back injury early in the Patriots' 2010 training camp, Kaczur missed all the preseason and was inactive for the first four games of the season before being placed on injured reserve on October 12, 2010.

On July 29, 2011, he was released by New England.
