= Duane Starks =

American football player (born 1974)

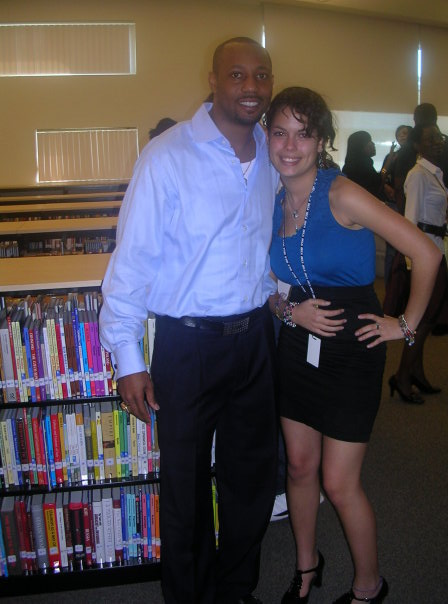
- Starks (left) with a student at Miami Beach Senior High School in 2010

No. 22, 23, 28
- Position: Cornerback

Personal information
- Born: May 23, 1974 (age 52); Miami, Florida, U.S.
- Listed height: 5 ft 10 in (1.78 m)
- Listed weight: 172 lb (78 kg)

Career information
- High school: Miami Beach Senior (Miami Beach, Florida)
- College: Holmes CC (1993–1994); Miami (FL) (1995–1997)
- NFL draft: 1998: 1st round, 10th overall pick

Career history
- Baltimore Ravens (1998–2001); Arizona Cardinals (2002–2004); New England Patriots (2005); Oakland Raiders (2006–2007)

Awards and highlights
- Super Bowl champion (XXXV)

Career NFL statistics
- Tackles: 350
- Forced fumbles: 7
- Fumble recoveries: 4
- Passes defended: 81
- Interceptions: 25
- Defensive touchdowns: 2
- Stats at Pro Football Reference

Duane Lonell Starks (born May 23, 1974) is an American former professional football player who was a cornerback in the National Football League (NFL). He was selected by the Baltimore Ravens 10th overall in the 1998 NFL draft. He played college football for the Miami Hurricanes.

Starks, who earned a Super Bowl ring with the Ravens in Super Bowl XXXV, also played for the Arizona Cardinals, New England Patriots, and Oakland Raiders.

== Early life ==
Duane Starks attended Miami Beach Senior High School in Miami Beach, Florida, and won varsity letters in both football and track and field. In football, as a senior quarterback, he was a first-team All-Dade County selection, where he was a teammate of future pro bowl corner Samari Rolle, and a second-team All-Florida selection. In track, he finished second at the State Finals on the long jump and set the school record in the long jump.

== College career ==
Starks was a two-year starter at cornerback, and a star returner for the University of Miami. Starks was interviewed about his time at the University of Miami for the documentary The U, which premiered December 12, 2009 on ESPN.

== Professional career ==
Pre-draft measurables
Height	Weight	Arm length	Hand span	40-yard dash	10-yard split	20-yard split	Vertical jump
5 ft 10 in (1.78 m)	170 lb (77 kg)	31 1/4 in (0.79 m)	9 1/8 in (0.23 m)	4.40 s	1.60 s	2.57 s	38.0 in (0.97 m)

=== Baltimore Ravens ===
Duane Starks was picked with the tenth overall pick in the first round of the 1998 NFL draft. Right away he was an important player in the Ravens famous defense. He recorded 20 interceptions in his first four years as a Raven. He is most well known by Raven fans for his interception for a touchdown in Super Bowl XXXV, a play that many agree ended the New York Giants small chance for a comeback.

=== Arizona Cardinals ===
Starks was signed as a free agent at the end of the 2001 season by the Arizona Cardinals. He became an impact in the secondary by intercepting two passes his first year. His second year was ended early with a season-ending injury. He bounced back after that by intercepting three passes and returning one for a touchdown. He recorded a total of 5 interceptions and one touchdown with the team.

=== New England Patriots ===
After the 2004 season the New England Patriots traded a third round pick to bring the veteran to bolster their secondary after losing their Pro Bowl corner Ty Law in the off season. He was having a lackluster season when the Pats placed him on IR after a season-ending shoulder injury.

=== Oakland Raiders ===
The Oakland Raiders signed Starks after the Patriots released him following the 2005 season. He played in only three games during the 2006 season, recording three tackles. He was inactive for the first three games of the Raiders' 2007 season, and released to make room for quarterback and first-round pick JaMarcus Russell. He was out of football the rest of the 2007 season.

On April 15, 2008, Starks was re-signed by the Raiders on a one-year contract, but was released by the Raiders on May 13.

== NFL statistics ==
Legend
	Led the league
	Super Bowl champion
**Bold**	Career high

=== Regular season ===
Year	Team	GP	GS	Tackles				Fumbles		Interceptions						Punt returns				
Year	Team	GP	GS	Comb	Solo	Ast	Sack	FF	FR	Int	Yds	Avg	Lng	TD	PD	Ret	Yds	Avg	Lng	TD
1998	BAL	**16**	8	51	47	4	0.0	2	0	5	3	0.6	2	0	15	—	—	—	—	—
1999	BAL	**16**	5	42	39	3	0.0	0	0	5	59	11.8	43	**1**	18	—	—	—	—	—
2000	BAL	15	**15**	49	45	4	0.0	0	1	**6**	**125**	**20.8**	**64**	0	**23**	**9**	**135**	**15.0**	**47**	0
2001	BAL	15	**15**	**59**	**54**	5	0.0	**4**	0	4	9	2.3	9	0	17	—	—	—	—	—
2002	ARI	10	10	55	47	**8**	0.0	0	0	2	3	1.5	3	0	8	—	—	—	—	—
2003	ARI	Did not play due to injury																		
2004	ARI	15	8	58	53	5	**1.0**	1	**2**	3	46	15.3	41	**1**	12	7	43	6.1	15	0
2005	NE	7	6	28	21	7	0.0	0	0	0	0	0.0	0	0	5	—	—	—	—	—
2006	OAK	3	0	3	3	0	0.0	0	0	0	0	0.0	0	0	0	—	—	—	—	—
2007	OAK	Did not play																		
Career		97	67	345	309	36	1.0	7	3	25	245	9.8	64	2	98	16	178	11.1	47	0

=== Postseason ===
Year	Team	GP	GS	Tackles				Fumbles		Interceptions					
Year	Team	GP	GS	Comb	Solo	Ast	Sack	FF	FR	Int	Yds	Avg	Lng	TD	PD
2000	BAL	**4**	**4**	**19**	**17**	**2**	0.0	0	0	**3**	**93**	**31.0**	**49**	**1**	**6**
2001	BAL	2	2	11	9	**2**	0.0	0	0	1	26	26.0	26	0	2
2005	NE	Did not play due to injury													
Career		6	6	30	26	4	0.0	0	0	4	119	29.8	49	1	8
