= Joel Collier =

American football coach and executive (born 1963)

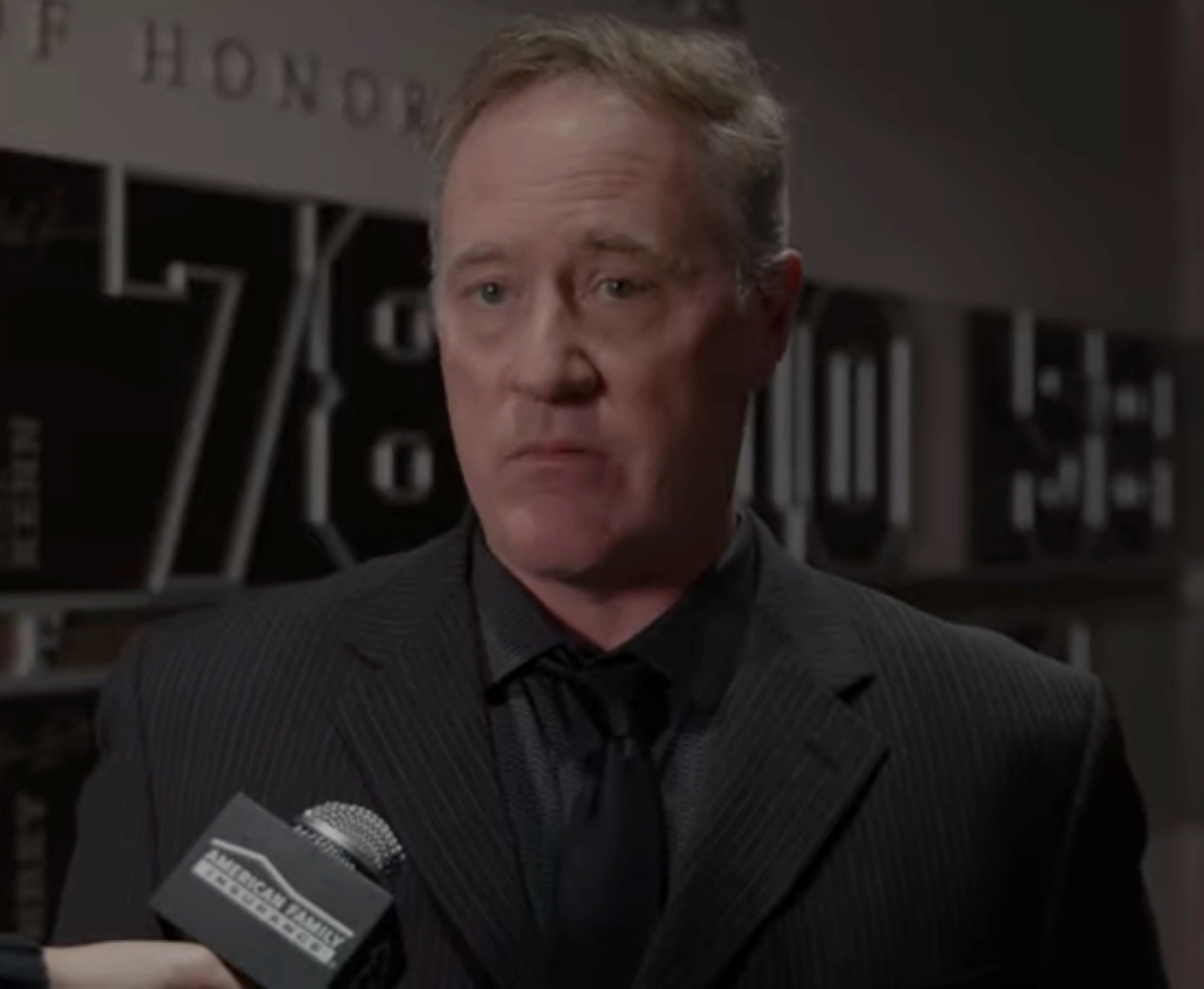
- Collier in 2022

Personal information
- Born: December 25, 1963 (age 62); Buffalo, New York, U.S.

Career information
- College: Northern Colorado

Career history

Coaching
- Syracuse (1988–1989) Graduate assistant; Tampa Bay Buccaneers (1990) Offensive assistant; New England Patriots (1991–1992) Assistant running backs and receivers coach; Miami Dolphins (1994–1997) Assistant linebackers coach; Miami Dolphins (1998–2004) Running backs coach; New England Patriots (2005) Assistant secondary coach; New England Patriots (2006–2007) Secondary coach; St. Thomas Aquinas HS (2013) Secondary coach

Operations
- New England Patriots (1993) Pro scout; Kansas City Chiefs (2008–2013) Assistant general manager; Atlanta Falcons (2016–2018) Director of pro personnel; Atlanta Falcons (2019–2025) National scout

Joel Collier (born December 25, 1963) is an American football executive who most recently was a national scout for the Atlanta Falcons of the National Football League (NFL). He is the son of Joe Collier, a former defensive coordinator for the Denver Broncos and New England Patriots and head coach of the Buffalo Bills.

== Playing career ==
Collier attended the University of Northern Colorado, where he played football as a linebacker from 1984 to 1987. He was also an academic All-North Central Conference selection.

== Coaching career ==
=== College ===
Under head coach Dick MacPherson, Collier began his coaching career as a graduate assistant at Syracuse University in 1988.

=== NFL ===
After his two-year stint at Syracuse, Collier moved to the NFL for the 1990 season as an offensive assistant with the Tampa Bay Buccaneers. In 1991, he re-joined MacPherson, then head coach of the Patriots, as an assistant running backs and wide receivers coach until 1992. In 1993, he entered the Patriots' scouting department as a pro scout. From 1994 to 1997, Collier served as a defensive assistant for the Miami Dolphins. In 1998, he became the Dolphins' running backs coach, a position he held until 2004. Prior to the Patriots' 2005 season, he was hired as their secondary coach. He was not retained by the Patriots following their 2007 season. In February 2009, he was hired by Kansas City Chiefs general manager Scott Pioli, a former executive for the Patriots, as assistant general manager. He remained as the Chiefs assistant general manager until Andy Reid turned over most of the staff.

=== Saint Thomas Aquinas High School ===
After being let go by Reid in the spring of 2013, Collier decided to volunteer at his son's high school for the 2013 season at Saint Thomas Aquinas High School in Overland Park, Kansas. Collier helped assist the defensive backs. The team went 3–7, including a 1st round loss in the playoffs. Collier shared that he intended to return to coaching in the NFL for the next year.

=== Atlanta Falcons ===
From 2016 to 2018, Collier was the director of pro personnel for the Atlanta Falcons. In 2019, he was reassigned to the position of national scout. On May 18, 2025, Collier and the Falcons organization parted ways.

== Personal life ==
His father Joe Collier is a former NFL head coach.
