= James Sanders (American football) =

American football player (born 1983)

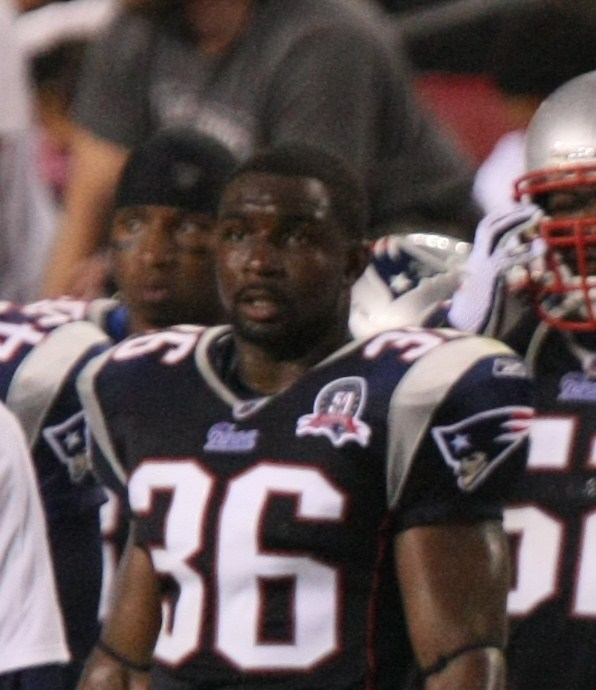
- Sanders with the New England Patriots in 2009

No. 36, 39
- Position: Safety

Personal information
- Born: November 11, 1983 (age 42); Porterville, California, U.S.
- Listed height: 5 ft 10 in (1.78 m)
- Listed weight: 210 lb (95 kg)

Career information
- High school: Monache (Porterville)
- College: Fresno State
- NFL draft: 2005: 4th round, 133rd overall pick

Career history
- New England Patriots (2005−2010); Atlanta Falcons (2011); Arizona Cardinals (2012)

Awards and highlights
- 2× First-team All-WAC (2003, 2004)

Career NFL statistics
- Total tackles: 363
- Sacks: 1
- Forced fumbles: 2
- Fumble recoveries: 6
- Interceptions: 8
- Defensive touchdowns: 3
- Stats at Pro Football Reference

James Sanders (born November 11, 1983) is an American former professional football player who was a safety in the National Football League (NFL). He was selected by the New England Patriots in the fourth round of the 2005 NFL draft. He played college football for the Fresno State Bulldogs.

Sanders also played for the Atlanta Falcons and Arizona Cardinals.

== College career ==
After graduating from Monache High School, Sanders attended Fresno State University, where he played for head coach Pat Hill, a former assistant under Patriots head coach Bill Belichick, then coach of the Cleveland Browns. As a freshman in 2002, Sanders was a first-team freshman All-American selection by the Football Writers Association of America and an All-WAC honorable mention. He started every game at strong safety for the second straight year in his 2003 sophomore season, earning first-team All-WAC honors. In his junior season in 2004, Sanders again earned All-WAC honors in what would prove to be his final season at Fresno State.

== Professional career ==
Pre-draft measurables
Height	Weight	40-yard dash	20-yard shuttle	Three-cone drill	Vertical jump	Broad jump	Bench press
5 ft 10 3/4 in (1.80 m)	214 lb (97 kg)	4.65 s	4.02 s	7.12 s	36.0 in (0.91 m)	9 ft 4 in (2.84 m)	22 reps
All values from Pro Day

=== New England Patriots ===
Sanders was selected by the New England Patriots in the fourth round of the 2005 NFL draft (133rd overall). He was subsequently signed by the Patriots in July 2005. He played in 10 games as a rookie in 2005, starting twice. In a Week 14 game against the Buffalo Bills, Sanders returned an interception late in the game 39 yards for a touchdown. Sanders started five of the 16 games he played in during the 2006 season, filling in for an injured Rodney Harrison.

During the 2007 season, fellow safety Eugene Wilson lost his starting spot to Sanders, who went on to start 15 games in the regular season and Super Bowl XLII. He started 14 games in 2008, missing two games in December due to an injury. In March 2009, Sanders agreed to terms with the Patriots on a three-year contract. It was reported that Sanders turned down more money elsewhere to return to the Patriots.

During an August 2, 2009 press conference, Patriots head coach Bill Belichick spoke of Sanders:

James is an excellent leader. He plays with a good level of confidence. He's a very good physical player. He's a tough kid. Football's important to him. He's a very committed player, spends a lot of time in the classroom, studying, learning, watching tape, making sure he knows his assignments. I think he's a leader for any young player, forget young player, for any player to emulate and follow. I think he's very professional and you would like to have 53 players like James on your team in terms of his work ethic, his toughness [and] being a teammate.

Sanders started the first game of the 2009 season before losing his job to Brandon McGowan in Week 2. He suffered a shoulder injury in Week 4 and missed the team's Week 5 game. He regained his starting job in Week 14, and started the final four games of the season as well as the Patriots' playoff loss to the Baltimore Ravens. He finished the season with 48 tackles.

In 2010, Sanders opened the regular season as a starter in the Patriots' base defense following the demotion of Brandon Meriweather, and started two of the first three games. After Meriweather returned as a starter in Week 4, Sanders was the team's third safety until he filled in for an injured Patrick Chung in Weeks 8 and 9. In Week 10, Sanders did not start but was named AFC Defensive Player of the Week after intercepting a Ben Roethlisberger pass and returning it 32 yards for a touchdown in a win over the Pittsburgh Steelers. In the next game against the Indianapolis Colts, Sanders made a game-saving interception at the Patriots' 6-yard line with seconds remaining when he picked off quarterback Peyton Manning's throw as the Colts offense (already in field goal range) was poised to score and either tie the game or take the lead with a touchdown.

Sanders finished the 2010 season with 58 tackles, three interceptions, and one forced fumble in 15 games played (nine starts). He was released by New England on August 29, 2011.

=== Atlanta Falcons ===
On August 30, 2011, Sanders signed with the Atlanta Falcons.

=== Arizona Cardinals ===
Sanders signed with the Arizona Cardinals on April 4, 2012.

== NFL career statistics ==
Legend
	Led the league
**Bold**	Career high

=== Regular season ===
Year	Team	Games		Tackles					Interceptions					Fumbles			
Year	Team	GP	GS	Cmb	Solo	Ast	Sck	TFL	Int	Yds	TD	Lng	PD	FF	FR	Yds	TD
2005	NWE	10	2	16	13	3	0.0	0	1	39	**1**	39	1	0	**1**	0	0
2006	NWE	**16**	5	43	26	17	**1.0**	1	1	21	0	21	1	0	0	0	0
2007	NWE	15	**15**	**70**	**51**	19	0.0	**2**	2	43	0	**42**	5	**1**	**1**	0	0
2008	NWE	14	14	67	44	**23**	0.0	1	1	9	0	9	3	0	0	0	0
2009	NWE	14	5	48	32	16	0.0	0	0	0	0	0	3	**1**	**1**	0	0
2010	NWE	15	9	59	43	16	0.0	0	**3**	**60**	**1**	32	**6**	0	**1**	0	0
2011	ATL	15	6	41	30	11	0.0	0	0	0	0	0	3	0	**1**	25	0
2012	ARI	15	0	19	13	6	0.0	0	0	0	0	0	0	0	**1**	**93**	**1**
		114	56	363	252	111	1.0	4	8	172	2	42	22	2	6	118	1

=== Playoffs ===
Year	Team	Games		Tackles					Interceptions					Fumbles			
Year	Team	GP	GS	Cmb	Solo	Ast	Sck	TFL	Int	Yds	TD	Lng	PD	FF	FR	Yds	TD
2005	NWE	2	0	0	0	0	0.0	0	0	0	0	0	0	0	0	0	0
2006	NWE	**3**	**3**	**18**	**13**	**5**	**1.0**	**1**	0	0	0	0	**1**	0	0	0	0
2007	NWE	**3**	**3**	16	12	4	0.0	0	0	0	0	0	0	0	**1**	0	0
2009	NWE	1	1	11	9	2	0.0	0	0	0	0	0	0	0	0	0	0
2010	NWE	1	0	2	1	1	0.0	0	0	0	0	0	0	0	0	0	0
2011	ATL	1	0	7	5	2	0.0	0	0	0	0	0	0	0	0	0	0
		11	7	54	40	14	1.0	1	0	0	0	0	1	0	1	0	0
