= Billy Yates (American football) =

American football player and coach (born 1980)

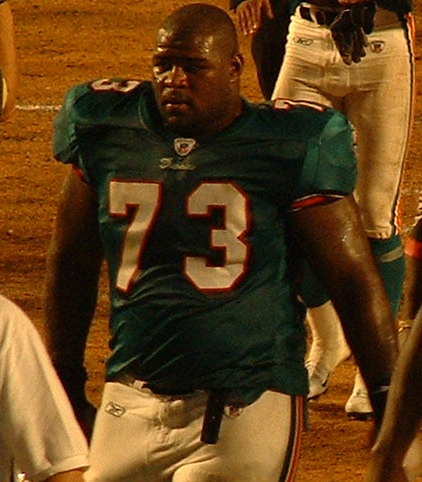
- Yates with the Dolphins in 2003

Ohio State Buckeyes football
- Title: Defensive quality control coach

Personal information
- Born: April 15, 1980 (age 46); Fort Worth, Texas, U.S.
- Listed height: 6 ft 2 in (1.88 m)
- Listed weight: 305 lb (138 kg)

Career information
- High school: Corsicana (TX)
- College: Texas A&M
- NFL draft: 2003: undrafted

Career history

Playing
- Miami Dolphins (2003); New England Patriots (2004–2008); Cleveland Browns (2009–2010)

Coaching
- Texas A&M (2013) Strength and conditioning coach; Texas Tech (2014–2016) Assistant strength coach; New England Patriots (2015) Bill Walsh Minority Coaching Fellowship; Bowling Green (2017–2019) Head strength and conditioning coach; Detroit Lions (2018–2019) WCF Minority Coaching Assistantship; Detroit Lions (2020) Assistant offensive line coach; New England Patriots (2021–2023) Assistant offensive line coach

Awards and highlights
- Super Bowl champion (XXXIX)

Career NFL statistics
- Games played: 41
- Games started: 14
- Stats at Pro Football Reference

William LaQuayne Yates (born April 15, 1980) is an American football coach and former offensive guard in the National Football League (NFL). He played college football at Texas A&M and was signed by the Miami Dolphins as an undrafted free agent in 2003.

Yates also played for the New England Patriots and Cleveland Browns. He earned a Super Bowl ring with the Patriots in Super Bowl XXXIX.

== Early life ==
Yates attended Corsicana High School in Corsicana, Texas, where he lettered in football, track and field, and basketball.

== Playing career ==
=== College ===
After graduating from high school, Yates attended Texas A&M University beginning in 1999. He was a reserve offensive lineman in his first two seasons, but started 20 games over his junior and senior seasons in 2001 and 2002.

=== National Football League ===
==== Miami Dolphins ====
Yates was signed as an undrafted free agent after the 2003 NFL draft by the Miami Dolphins. He made the Dolphins' 53-man roster out of training camp and saw action in three games as a reserve in 2003. He was waived by the Dolphins on September 5, 2004.

==== New England Patriots ====
Yates was signed to the practice squad of the New England Patriots on September 11, 2004, where he spent the remainder of the regular season and playoffs until being activated for Super Bowl XXXIX. He also began the 2005 season on the Patriots' practice squad before being activated on November 12 following the loss of starting center Dan Koppen for the season. He was a reserve offensive lineman for the remainder of the season and playoffs, while also seeing time on kickoff coverage units.

Yates began yet another season on the practice squad for the Patriots in 2006, but was activated on October 21 and a game later made his first start on October 30, 2006, against the Minnesota Vikings in place of an injured Stephen Neal. He would go on to start the Patriots' next two games at right guard but was injured in the second against the New York Jets and was placed on injured reserve, missing the remainder of the season with a broken leg. Yates, for the first time with the Patriots, made the 53-man roster to open the 2007 season; he started the second game of the year against the San Diego Chargers, his only start of the year.

When Neal began the 2008 season on the Physically Unable to Perform list, Yates started all seven games that Neal missed. He was inactive or did not play for the remainder of the season once Neal returned. Yates was released by the team on February 17, 2009, only to be re-signed two days later in a salary cap-related move.

He was released on September 4, 2009.

==== Cleveland Browns ====
Yates was signed by the Cleveland Browns on September 16, 2009. He played in seven games during his first season with the Browns, but started none. In 2010 he played in nine games, starting three.

==== Retirement ====
On August 15, 2011, Yates announced his intent to retire from football.

== Coaching career ==
=== Texas A&M ===
In 2013, Yates was hired by Texas A&M as their strength and conditioning coach.

=== Texas Tech ===
In 2014, Yates was hired by Texas Tech as their assistant strength coach.

=== New England Patriots ===
During the summer of 2015 Yates worked with the Patriots as part of the Bill Walsh Minority Fellowship.

=== Bowling Green State University ===
In 2016, Yates was hired by Bowling Green State University as their head strength and conditioning coach.

=== Detroit Lions ===
On January 7, 2020, Yates was hired by the Detroit Lions as their assistant offensive line coach.

=== New England Patriots ===
In February 2021, Yates joined the New England Patriots coaching staff as an offensive assistant and assistant offensive line coach.

=== Ohio State University ===
Ohio State hired Yates for the 2025 Ohio State Buckeyes football team as a defensive quality control coach under defensive coordinator Matt Patricia.
