= Eugene Wilson (American football) =

American football player (born 1980)

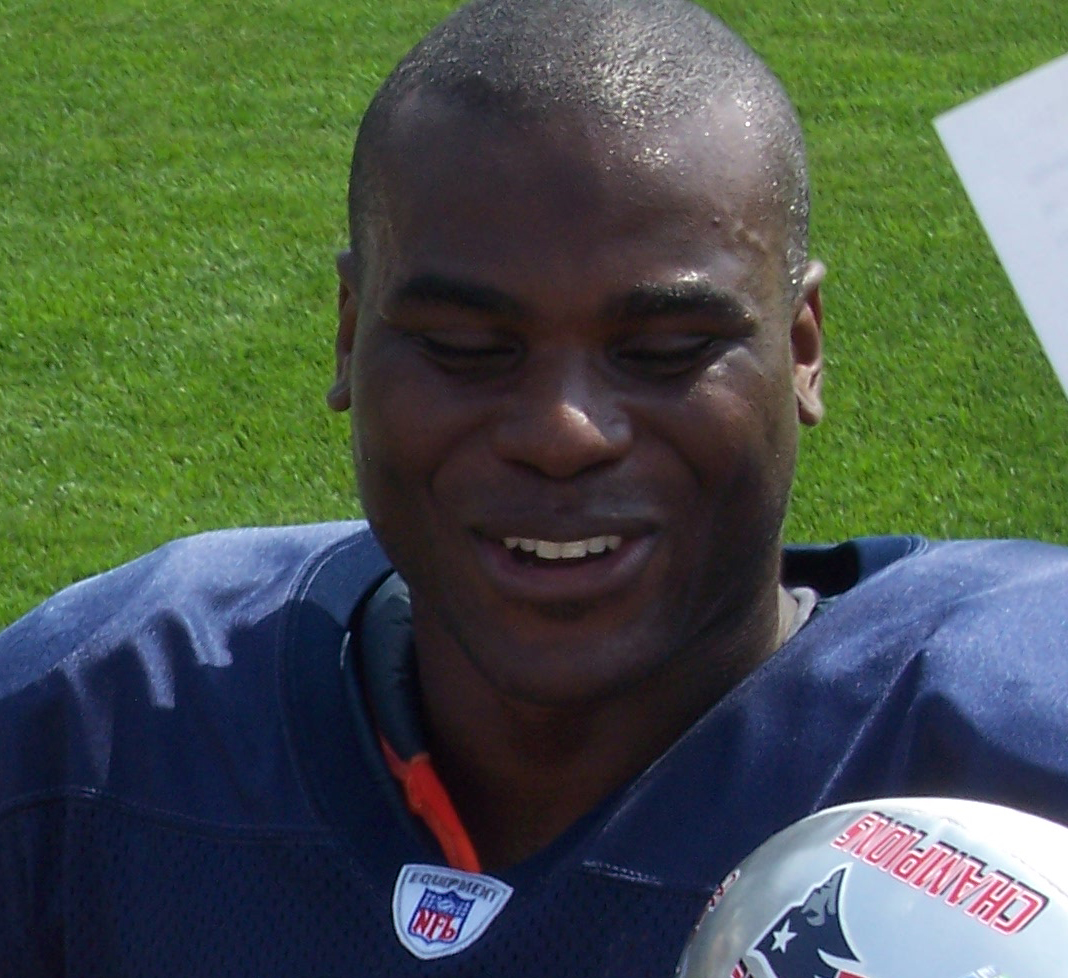
- Wilson with the New England Patriots in 2006

No. 26
- Position: Safety

Personal information
- Born: August 17, 1980 (age 46); Merrillville, Indiana, U.S.
- Listed height: 5 ft 10 in (1.78 m)
- Listed weight: 200 lb (91 kg)

Career information
- High school: Merrillville
- College: Illinois
- NFL draft: 2003: 2nd round, 36th overall pick

Career history
- New England Patriots (2003–2007); Tampa Bay Buccaneers (2008)*; Houston Texans (2008–2010)
- * Offseason or practice squad member only

Awards and highlights
- 2× Super Bowl champion (XXXVIII, XXXIX); PFWA All-Rookie Team (2003); Second-team All-American (2001); First-team All-Big Ten (2001); Second Team All-Big Ten (2002)

Career NFL statistics
- Total tackles: 399
- Forced fumbles: 3
- Fumble recoveries: 4
- Pass deflections: 41
- Interceptions: 14
- Defensive touchdowns: 1
- Stats at Pro Football Reference

Eugene W. Wilson Jr (born August 17, 1980) is an American former professional football player who was a safety in the National Football League (NFL). He played college football for the Illinois Fighting Illini and was selected by the New England Patriots in the second round of the 2003 NFL draft.

Wilson was also a member of the Tampa Bay Buccaneers and the Houston Texans. He earned two Super Bowl rings during his tenure with the Patriots.

== Early life ==
Wilson attended Merrillville High School in Merrillville, Indiana and lettered in football and basketball. In football, he was a two-time All-State selection and, as a senior, he was named the Conference's Defensive Player of the Year. In basketball, he was a four-year varsity letterman and starter and was a two-time All-Conference selection.

== College career ==
Wilson attended the University of Illinois where he majored in speech communications. He finished his career with 176 Tackles (139 Solo, 37 Assist), 11 INT, and 60 PD. He also had 93 punt returns for 896 yards and 2 TD.

== Professional career ==
Pre-draft measurables
| Height | Weight | Arm length | Hand span | 40-yard dash | 10-yard split | 20-yard split | 20-yard shuttle | Three-cone drill | Vertical jump | Broad jump | Bench press |
|---|---|---|---|---|---|---|---|---|---|---|---|
| 5 ft 10 in (1.78 m) | 192 lb (87 kg) | 30 3/4 in (0.78 m) | 8 5/8 in (0.22 m) | 4.48 s | 1.60 s | 2.59 s | 4.05 s | 7.18 s | 38 in (0.97 m) | 10 ft 2 in (3.10 m) | 15 reps |
All values from NFL Combine.

=== New England Patriots ===
Wilson was selected by the Patriots in the second round (36th overall) of the 2003 NFL draft. He won Super Bowl XXXVIII in 2003 and Super Bowl XXXIX in 2004 with the New England Patriots. In Super Bowl XXXVII, he was successfully stiff armed by Muhsin Muhammad, resulting in a Super Bowl record 85-yard touchdown play. He recovered a fumble by Philadelphia Eagles tight end L.J. Smith in Super Bowl XXXIX before leaving the game after sustaining an injury on a kickoff. He also intercepted Pittsburgh Steelers quarterback Ben Roethlisberger twice in the Patriots 41–27 victory in the 2004 AFC Championship Game.

In 2007, in a Week 15 game against the New York Jets, Wilson returned a Kellen Clemens interception for a touchdown, making him the 21st Patriot to score a touchdown that season, tying an NFL record.

=== Tampa Bay Buccaneers ===
On March 14, 2008, the Tampa Bay Buccaneers signed Wilson to a one-year, $1.8 million contract including $500,000 guaranteed. However, Wilson was released on September 1, 2008.

=== Houston Texans ===
Two days after his release from the Buccaneers, Wilson was signed by the Houston Texans on September 3, 2008.

During a preseason game against the Minnesota Vikings on August 31, 2009, Wilson fell victim to an illegal "crackback" block thrown by Brett Favre. He was injured on the play and was listed as "day-to-day". Wilson returned to the field on September 20, 2009, and started the second game of the season, recording an interception in the Texans' win over the Tennessee Titans.

Wilson was placed Injured Reserve on November 24, 2009, due to broken toes.

On February 18, 2011, the Texans released Wilson.

== NFL career statistics ==
| Year | Team | GP | Comb | Solo | Ast | Sack | FF | FR | Yds | Int | Yds | Avg | Lng | TD | PD |
|---|---|---|---|---|---|---|---|---|---|---|---|---|---|---|---|
| 2003 | NE | 16 | 61 | 47 | 14 | 0.0 | 0 | 0 | 0 | 4 | 18 | 5 | 10 | 0 | 9 |
| 2004 | NE | 15 | 67 | 57 | 10 | 0.0 | 2 | 2 | 0 | 4 | 51 | 13 | 24 | 0 | 7 |
| 2005 | NE | 16 | 68 | 44 | 24 | 0.0 | 0 | 1 | 0 | 1 | 0 | 0 | 0 | 0 | 7 |
| 2006 | NE | 4 | 24 | 20 | 4 | 0.0 | 0 | 0 | 0 | 0 | 0 | 0 | 0 | 0 | 2 |
| 2007 | NE | 11 | 31 | 27 | 4 | 0.0 | 0 | 1 | 0 | 1 | 5 | 5 | 5 | 1 | 3 |
| 2008 | HOU | 12 | 63 | 52 | 11 | 0.0 | 0 | 0 | 0 | 2 | 36 | 18 | 19 | 0 | 7 |
| 2009 | HOU | 8 | 29 | 23 | 6 | 0.0 | 1 | 0 | 0 | 2 | 29 | 15 | 16 | 0 | 3 |
| 2010 | HOU | 14 | 56 | 41 | 15 | 0.0 | 0 | 0 | 0 | 0 | 0 | 0 | 0 | 0 | 3 |
| Career | | 96 | 399 | 311 | 88 | 0.0 | 3 | 4 | 0 | 14 | 139 | 10 | 24 | 1 | 41 |
