= Kory Chapman =

American football player (born 1980)

No. 31
- Position: Running back

Personal information
- Born: July 13, 1980 (age 46); Batesville, Mississippi, U.S.
- Listed height: 6 ft 1 in (1.85 m)
- Listed weight: 202 lb (92 kg)

Career information
- High school: South Panola (Batesville)
- College: Jacksonville State
- NFL draft: 2004: undrafted

Career history
- Baltimore Ravens (2004)*; New England Patriots (2004–2005)*; Cologne Centurions (2005); Indianapolis Colts (2005–2006); Cleveland Browns (2007–2008)*
- * Offseason or practice squad member only

Awards and highlights
- 2× Super Bowl champion (XXXIX, XLI)
- Stats at Pro Football Reference

Robrielle Kory Chapman (born July 13, 1980) is an American former professional football player who was a running back in the National Football League (NFL). He was signed by the Baltimore Ravens as an undrafted free agent in 2004. He played college football for the Jacksonville State Gamecocks.

Chapman was also a member of the New England Patriots, Indianapolis Colts, and Cleveland Browns. He earned two Super Bowl rings - one with the Patriots and one with the Colts.

== Early life ==
Chapman attended South Panola High and helped them to the Class 5A State Championship as a senior.

== College career ==
Chapman played college football at Jacksonville State. He set a school record by rushing for 298 yards against Tennessee-Martin. He majored in psychology.

== Professional career ==
=== 2004 ===
Chapman was signed by the Baltimore Ravens as an undrafted rookie free agent but was waived at the end of training camp. He was picked up by the New England Patriots on September 7 where he spent time on and off the practice squad.

=== 2005 ===
Chapman was allocated to NFL Europe and played ten times for the Cologne Centurions. During his time there he rushed for 718 yards on 126 carries and five touchdowns. He was waived by the Patriots and then re-signed to their practice squad. The Indianapolis Colts signed him to their active roster on September 21 and made his NFL debut versus the Cleveland Brownson September 25 [San Francisco 49ers] on October 2.
