= Andre Torrey =

American football player (born 1982)

Profile
- Position: Linebacker

Personal information
- Born: January 28, 1982 (age 44); Oakland, California, U.S.

Career information
- College: Arizona

Career history
- 2005: New England Patriots*
- 2005-2006: Houston Texans*
- 2006: Berlin Thunder
- 2006: San Francisco 49ers
- * Offseason or practice squad member only

Andre Torrey (born January 28, 1982) is an American football linebacker who played for the New England Patriots (two games in 2005) and San Francisco 49ers (one game in 2006) in the National Football League (NFL).
