= Rosevelt Colvin =

American football player (born 1977)

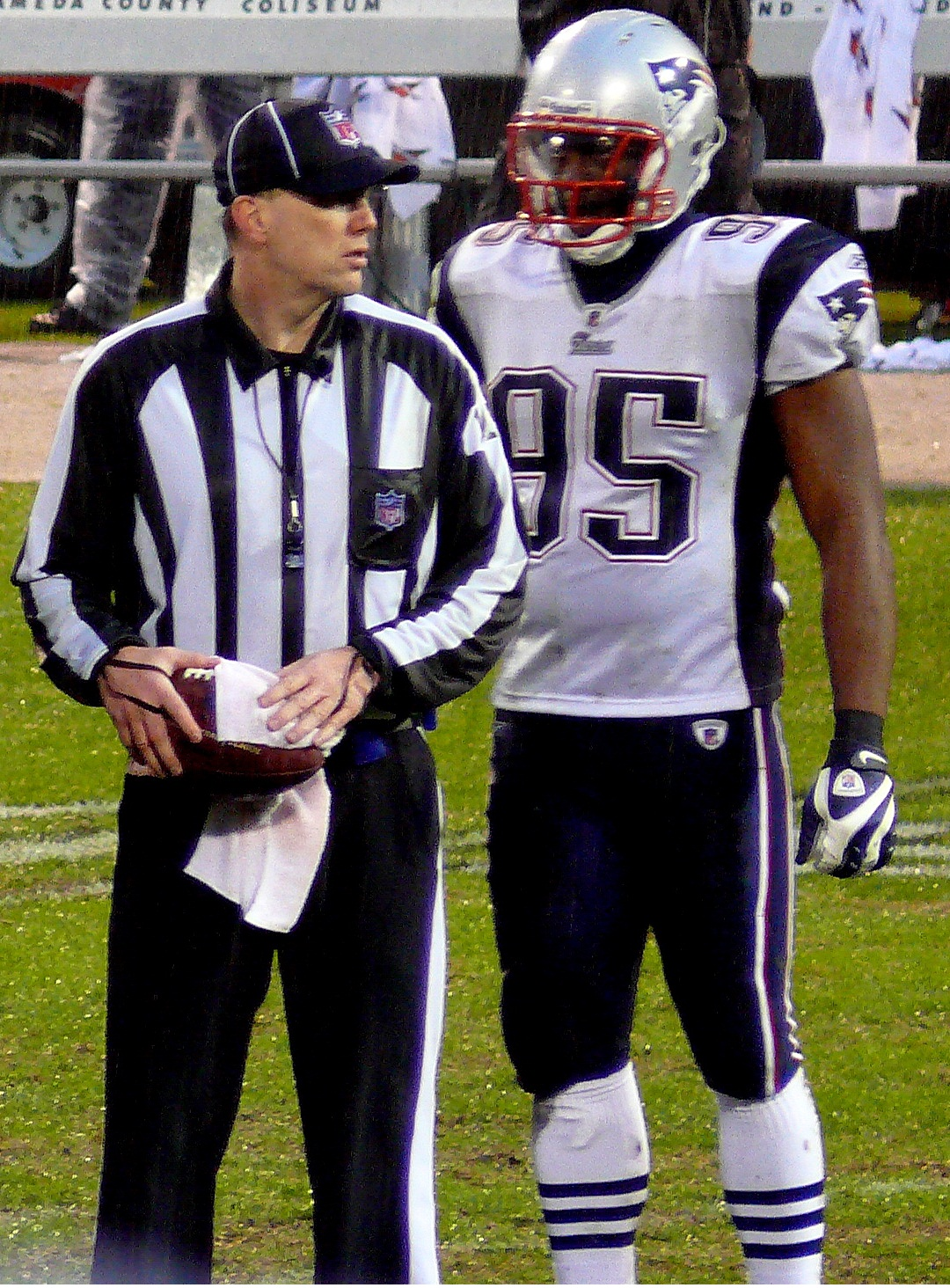
- Colvin with official John Parry in 2008

No. 59, 95
- Position: Linebacker

Personal information
- Born: September 5, 1977 (age 49); Indianapolis, Indiana, U.S.
- Listed height: 6 ft 3 in (1.91 m)
- Listed weight: 250 lb (113 kg)

Career information
- High school: Broad Ripple (Indianapolis)
- College: Purdue
- NFL draft: 1999: 4th round, 111th overall pick

Career history
- Chicago Bears (1999–2002); New England Patriots (2003–2007); Houston Texans (2008)*; New England Patriots (2008)
- * Offseason or practice squad member only

Awards and highlights
- 2× Super Bowl champion (XXXVIII, XXXIX); First-team All-Big Ten (1998); Second-team All-Big Ten (1997); Alamo Bowl MVP (Defense) (1998)

Career NFL statistics
- Total tackles: 363
- Sacks: 52.5
- Forced fumbles: 17
- Fumble recoveries: 9
- Interceptions: 3
- Defensive touchdowns: 1
- Stats at Pro Football Reference

Rosevelt Colvin, III (born September 5, 1977) is an American former professional football player who was a linebacker in the National Football League (NFL). He played college football for the Purdue Boilermakers and was selected by the Chicago Bears in the fourth round of the 1999 NFL draft.

Colvin played for the Bears between 1999 and 2002. He has earned two Super Bowl rings with the New England Patriots and was also a member of the Houston Texans. After his playing career, he became a football analyst for the Big Ten Network.

== Early life ==
Colvin attended Broad Ripple High School in Indianapolis. He earned Second Team All-State honors as a junior, and recorded a school-record 219 tackles as a senior. In that final season at Broad Ripple, Colvin earned honors as an All-Marion County Player, the Indianapolis News Defensive Player of the Year, an All-Metro Player, and was a First Team All-State selection. He also played basketball in high school.

While at Purdue, Colvin was selected to the All-Big Ten teams in 1997 and 1998. The Boilermakers went 18–7 in his final two seasons in West Lafayette.

== Professional career ==
=== Chicago Bears ===
Colvin was selected by the Chicago Bears in the fourth round of the 1999 NFL draft. He became the first Bear to post double-digit sacks in consecutive years, 2001–2002, since Richard Dent.

Colvin was named to the Bears' All-Decade Defense team along with fellow linebackers Brian Urlacher and Lance Briggs.

=== New England Patriots (first stint) ===
After playing for the Bears, Colvin was signed by the New England Patriots in 2003. Early in his first season with New England, Colvin suffered a shattered socket in his left hip. It took Colvin a year to recover, while the Patriots won back-to-back Super Bowls. Colvin did not start again until 2005, and in 2006, he was a full-time starter at outside linebacker for the Patriots. He was placed on injured reserve by the Patriots on November 27, 2007.

On February 26, 2008, the Patriots released Colvin after he failed a physical with the team. He had one year left on his contract with a $5.5 million base salary.

=== Houston Texans ===
On June 16, 2008, Colvin signed with the Houston Texans. On August 29, 2008, the Texans released Colvin during final roster cuts.

=== New England Patriots (second stint) ===
Colvin was re-signed by the New England Patriots on December 3, 2008, after cornerback Jason Webster was placed on injured reserve.

== Personal life ==
As a teenager, he worked at a concession stand in the RCA Dome in Indianapolis.

Colvin and his wife Tiffany reside in Indianapolis. They have four children. His daughter Raven, plays volleyball for Purdue and his son Myles, plays basketball for Wake Forest., as well as a cupcake shop called "SweeTies Gourmet Treats" with two locations.
