= Tom Ashworth =

American football player (born 1977)

No. 68
- Position: Offensive tackle

Personal information
- Born: October 10, 1977 (age 49); Denver, Colorado, U.S.
- Listed height: 6 ft 6 in (1.98 m)
- Listed weight: 305 lb (138 kg)

Career information
- High school: Cherry Creek (Greenwood Village, Colorado)
- College: Colorado
- NFL draft: 2001: undrafted

Career history
- San Francisco 49ers (2001)*; New England Patriots (2001–2005); Seattle Seahawks (2006–2007)
- * Offseason or practice squad member only

Awards and highlights
- 3× Super Bowl champion (XXXVI, XXXVIII, XXXIX)

Career NFL statistics
- Games played: 66
- Games started: 36
- Stats at Pro Football Reference

Thomas F. Ashworth (born October 10, 1977) is an American former professional football player who was an offensive tackle in the National Football League (NFL). Ashworth attended Cherry Creek High School in Greenwood Village, Colorado. He played college football at Colorado and was signed as an undrafted free agent by the San Francisco 49ers in 2001. He was released from the 49ers following training camp that same year and was signed to the New England Patriots practice squad.

Ashworth was placed on the active roster of the Patriots in 2002 and made his NFL debut on October 6 against the Miami Dolphins. Ashworth was named starting right tackle in 2003, but sat out most of the 2004 season following a back injury. In 2005 Ashworth moved in into the starting lineup replacing the injured Matt Light by week 4. On December 18, 2005, Ashworth caught a touchdown pass against the Tampa Bay Buccaneers from Tom Brady. Ashworth was released from the Patriots in 2006 and was signed by the Seattle Seahawks. On February 29, 2008, his contract was terminated by the Seahawks.
