= 2004 New England Patriots season =

45th season in franchise history; third Super Bowl win

- Owner: Robert Kraft
- Head coach: Bill Belichick
- Home stadium: Gillette Stadium

Results
- Record: 14–2
- Division place: 1st AFC East
- Playoffs: Won Divisional Playoffs (vs. Colts) 20–3; Won AFC Championship (at Steelers) 41–27; Won Super Bowl XXXIX (vs. Eagles) 24–21
- All-Pros: DE Richard Seymour (1st team); K Adam Vinatieri (1st team); LB Tedy Bruschi (2nd team); SS Rodney Harrison (2nd team)
- Pro Bowlers: QB Tom Brady; LB Tedy Bruschi; RB Corey Dillon; ST Larry Izzo; DE Richard Seymour; K Adam Vinatieri

Uniform

The 2004 season was the New England Patriots' 35th in the National Football League (NFL), their 45th overall and their fifth under head coach Bill Belichick. They finished with their second consecutive 14–2 record before advancing to and winning Super Bowl XXXIX, their third Super Bowl victory in four years, and their last until 2014. They were, until the 2023 Kansas City Chiefs did so in Super Bowl LVIII, the most recent team to repeat as NFL Champions, and only the second to win 3 Super Bowls in a 4-year span (the other being the Dallas Cowboys from the 1992 to 1995 seasons).

Following a Super Bowl win in 2003, the Patriots looked to improve their running game in the offseason. They replaced Antowain Smith with longtime but disgruntled Cincinnati Bengals running back Corey Dillon, who was acquired in a trade days before the 2004 NFL draft; Dillon would rush for a career-high 1,635 yards in 2004. Winning their first six games of the season, the Patriots set the NFL record for consecutive regular season victories (18), which was later broken by the 2006–2008 Patriots (21), and consecutive regular season and playoff victories (21) before losing to the Pittsburgh Steelers on October 31. In that game, Pro Bowl cornerback Ty Law was lost for the season with a foot injury. Combined with the loss of other starting cornerback Tyrone Poole two weeks earlier, the Patriots were forced to complete the regular season and playoffs by using second-year cornerback Asante Samuel, undrafted free agent Randall Gay, and longtime Patriots wide receiver Troy Brown at cornerback, among others.

With a 14–2 record and the second seed in the AFC playoffs, the Patriots defeated the Indianapolis Colts 20–3 at home in the playoffs for the second-straight year, holding the Colts' top offense to three points. The Patriots then defeated the Pittsburgh Steelers on the road, 41–27, in the AFC Championship Game. Prior to the Patriots' matchup with the Philadelphia Eagles in Super Bowl XXXIX, Eagles wide receiver Freddie Mitchell said he did not know the names of the Patriots' defensive backs, which was taken as a sign of disrespect by the Patriots' "replacement" secondary. The Patriots would go on to defeat the Eagles 24–21 in their second straight Super Bowl victory and third championship in four seasons, cementing their status as the NFL sports dynasty of the 2000s. Despite being eventually overshadowed by their 2007 counterparts, the 2004 Patriots are still considered one of the greatest NFL teams of all time. In 2019, the NFL on its 100th anniversary ranked the 2004 Patriots as the No. 16 greatest NFL team of all time, the highest ranked New England team that won the Super Bowl. Until their 2016 team won the Super Bowl, no team with more than 13 wins would win the Super Bowl. Analyst Aaron Schatz, creator of the DVOA metric, listed the 2004 Patriots as the greatest Super Bowl winning team of the Brady–Belichick era using DVOA, in addition to being ranked seventh all-time among all Super Bowl winning teams. After this the Patriots would not win another Super Bowl until Super Bowl XLIX 10 years later.

== Offseason ==
=== 2004 NFL draft ===
2004 New England Patriots draft selections
Round	Overall	Player	Position	College
1	21	Vince Wilfork	Defensive tackle	Miami (FL)
1	32	Benjamin Watson	Tight end	Georgia
2	63	Marquise Hill	Defensive end	LSU
3	95	Guss Scott	Safety	Florida
4	113	Dexter Reid	Safety	North Carolina
4	128	Cedric Cobbs	Running back	Arkansas
5	164	P. K. Sam	Wide receiver	Florida State
7	233	Christian Morton	Cornerback	Florida State

== Staff ==
2004 New England Patriots staff
Front office: Chairman/CEO – Robert Kraft; Vice chairman – Jonathan Kraft; Senior vice president/COO – Andy Wasynczuk; Vice president of player personnel – Scott Pioli; Director of pro personnel – Nick Caserio; Director of college scouting – Thomas Dimitroff; Assistant director of college scouting – Lionel Vital; Assistant director of pro scouting – Keith Kidd; Football research director – Ernie Adams; Head coaches: Head coach – Bill Belichick; Assistant head coach/offensive line – Dante Scarnecchia; Offensive coaches: Offensive coordinator – Charlie Weis; Quarterbacks – Josh McDaniels; Running backs – Ivan Fears; Wide receivers – Brian Daboll; Assistant offensive line/tight ends – Jeff Davidson; Coaching assistant – Matt Patricia	Defensive coaches: Defensive coordinator – Romeo Crennel; Defensive line – Pepper Johnson; Linebackers – Dean Pees; Defensive backs – Eric Mangini; Coaching assistant – Cory Undlin; Special teams coaches: Special teams – Brad Seely; Strength and conditioning: Strength and conditioning – Mike Woicik; Assistant strength and conditioning – Markus Paul

== Opening training camp roster ==
At the time of the first public training camp practice at Gillette Stadium on July 29, they had the NFL maximum of 80 players signed to their roster. The Patriots received seven roster exemptions for the NFL Europe allocations of Rohan Davey, Jamil Soriano, Chas Gessner, Lawrence Flugence, Scott Farley, Buck Rasmussen, and David Pruce. Additionally, the Patriots allocated safety Jason Perry and cornerback Michael Hall to NFL Europe and received roster exemptions for them, but those players were waived before the start of training camp. Finally, rookie Benjamin Watson had not yet signed a contract by the start of camp and did not count against the roster limit.

New England Patriots 2004 opening training camp roster
Quarterbacks: 12 Tom Brady; 6 Rohan Davey; 16 Kliff Kingsbury; 19 Kurt Kittner; Running backs: 21 Mike Cloud; 28 Corey Dillon; 36 Malaefou MacKenzie FB; 44 Fred McCrary FB; 35 Patrick Pass FB; Wide receivers: 83 Deion Branch; 80 Troy Brown PR; 18 Chas Gessner; 87 David Givens; 10 Michael Jennings; 81 Bethel Johnson KR; 86 David Patten; 14 P. K. Sam ^{R}; 85 J. J. Stokes; Tight ends: -- Matt Cercone; 46 Zeron Flemister; 82 Daniel Graham; 42 Andy Mignery ^{UR}	Offensive linemen: 63 Joe Andruzzi G; 60 Wilbert Brown G; 74 Jack Fadule T; 76 Brandon Gorin T; 65 Bob Hallen C; 71 Russ Hochstein G; 70 Adrian Klemm T; 67 Dan Koppen C; 64 Gene Mruczkowski G; 61 Stephen Neal G; 62 Tim Provost T; 69 David Pruce T; 77 Jamil Soriano G; -- James O. Williams T; Defensive linemen: 96 Rodney Bailey DE; 74 Dwight Johnson DE; 91 Marquise Hill DE ^{R}; 99 Ethan Kelley NT; 90 Dan Klecko NT; 69 Buck Rasmussen DE; 93 Richard Seymour DE; 98 Keith Traylor NT; 94 Ty Warren DE; 75 Vince Wilfork NT ^{R}	Linebackers: 48 Tully Banta-Cain OLB; 54 Tedy Bruschi ILB; 51 Don Davis ILB; 46 Quinn Dorsey OLB ^{UR}; 45 Lawrence Flugence ILB; 53 Larry Izzo ILB; 52 Ted Johnson ILB; 47 Justin Kurpeikis ILB; 95 Roman Phifer ILB; 42 Grant Steen OLB ^{UR}; 50 Mike Vrabel OLB; Defensive backs: 27 Terrell Buckley CB; 30 Je'Rod Cherry FS; 43 Scott Farley SS; 21 Randall Gay CB ^{UR}; 37 Rodney Harrison SS; 24 Ty Law CB; 23 Shawn Mayer FS; 25 Christian Morton CB ^{R}; 38 Tyrone Poole CB; 42 Dexter Reid SS ^{R}; 22 Asante Samuel CB; 39 Guss Scott FS ^{R}; Special teams: 8 Josh Miller P; 46 Brian Sawyer LS ^{UR}; 5 Cody Scates P ^{UR}; 4 Adam Vinatieri K	Reserve lists: 49 Eric Alexander ILB (Active/NF-Inj.) ^{UR}; 68 Tom Ashworth OT (Active/PUP); 58 Matt Chatham ILB (Active/NF-Inj.); 34 Cedric Cobbs RB (Active/PUP) ^{R}; 59 Rosevelt Colvin OLB (Active/PUP); 33 Kevin Faulk RB (Active/PUP); 88 Christian Fauria TE (Active/PUP); 97 Jarvis Green DE (Active/PUP); 72 Matt Light OT (Active/NF-Inj.); 55 Willie McGinest OLB (Active/PUP); 13 Jim Miller QB (Active/NF-Ill.); 66 Lonie Paxton LS (Active/PUP); 74 DeVonte Peterson DE (Active/NF-Inj.); 26 Eugene Wilson FS (Active/NF-Inj.); Unsigned draft picks: 84 Benjamin Watson TE ^{R}; Notations: R: 2004 Rookie; UR: 2004 Undrafted Rookie; Italicized players are not on the 80-man roster.

== Roster ==
=== Week 1 roster ===
New England Patriots 2004 Week 1 roster
Quarterbacks: 12 Tom Brady; 6 Rohan Davey; 13 Jim Miller; Running backs: 28 Corey Dillon; 33 Kevin Faulk; 35 Patrick Pass FB; Wide receivers: 83 Deion Branch; 80 Troy Brown PR; 87 David Givens; 81 Bethel Johnson KR; 86 David Patten; 14 P. K. Sam ^{R}; Tight ends: 88 Christian Fauria; 82 Daniel Graham; 84 Benjamin Watson ^{R}	Offensive linemen: 63 Joe Andruzzi G; 68 Tom Ashworth T; 76 Brandon Gorin T; 71 Russ Hochstein G; 70 Adrian Klemm T; 67 Dan Koppen C; 72 Matt Light T; 64 Gene Mruczkowski G; 61 Stephen Neal G; Defensive linemen: 97 Jarvis Green DE; 91 Marquise Hill DE ^{R}; 99 Ethan Kelley NT; 90 Dan Klecko NT; 93 Richard Seymour DE; 98 Keith Traylor NT; 94 Ty Warren DE; 75 Vince Wilfork NT ^{R}	Linebackers: 48 Tully Banta-Cain OLB; 54 Tedy Bruschi ILB; 59 Rosevelt Colvin OLB; 51 Don Davis ILB; 53 Larry Izzo ILB; 52 Ted Johnson ILB; 55 Willie McGinest OLB; 95 Roman Phifer ILB; 50 Mike Vrabel OLB; Defensive backs: 21 Randall Gay CB ^{UR}; 37 Rodney Harrison SS; 24 Ty Law CB; 23 Shawn Mayer FS; 38 Tyrone Poole CB; 42 Dexter Reid SS ^{R}; 22 Asante Samuel CB; 26 Eugene Wilson FS; Special teams: 8 Josh Miller P; 66 Lonie Paxton LS; 4 Adam Vinatieri K	Reserve lists: 96 Rodney Bailey DE (IR); 60 Wilbert Brown G (Did Not Report); 58 Matt Chatham ILB (NF-Inj.); 34 Cedric Cobbs RB (PUP) ^{R}; 46 Zeron Flemister TE (IR); 39 Guss Scott FS (IR) ^{R}; Practice squad: 49 Eric Alexander ILB ^{UR}; 32 Kory Chapman RB ^{UR}; 47 Justin Kurpeikis ILB; 36 Malaefou MacKenzie FB; 25 Christian Morton CB ^{R}; 69 David Pruce OT; 69 Buck Rasmussen DE; -- Russell Stuvaints S; Notations: R: 2004 Rookie; UR: 2004 Undrafted Rookie; Italicized players are not on the 53-man roster.

=== Final roster ===
New England Patriots 2004 final roster
Quarterbacks: 12 Tom Brady; 6 Rohan Davey; 13 Jim Miller; Running backs: 27 Rabih Abdullah; 34 Cedric Cobbs ^{R}; 28 Corey Dillon; 33 Kevin Faulk; 35 Patrick Pass FB; Wide receivers: 83 Deion Branch; 80 Troy Brown; 87 David Givens; 81 Bethel Johnson; 10 Kevin Kasper; 86 David Patten; Tight ends: 88 Christian Fauria; 82 Daniel Graham; 85 Jed Weaver	Offensive linemen: 63 Joe Andruzzi G; 76 Brandon Gorin T; 71 Russ Hochstein G; 67 Dan Koppen C; 72 Matt Light T; 64 Gene Mruczkowski C; 61 Stephen Neal G; 74 Billy Yates G; Defensive linemen: 97 Jarvis Green DE; 91 Marquise Hill DE ^{R}; 99 Ethan Kelley NT; 93 Richard Seymour DE; 98 Keith Traylor NT; 94 Ty Warren DE; 75 Vince Wilfork NT ^{R}	Linebackers: 48 Tully Banta-Cain OLB; 54 Tedy Bruschi ILB; 58 Matt Chatham OLB; 59 Rosevelt Colvin OLB; 51 Don Davis ILB; 53 Larry Izzo OLB; 52 Ted Johnson ILB; 55 Willie McGinest OLB; 95 Roman Phifer ILB; 50 Mike Vrabel OLB; Defensive backs: 30 Je'Rod Cherry SS; 21 Randall Gay CB ^{UR}; 37 Rodney Harrison SS; 29 Earthwind Moreland CB; 31 Hank Poteat CB; 42 Dexter Reid SS ^{R}; 22 Asante Samuel CB; 26 Eugene Wilson FS; Special teams: 8 Josh Miller P; 66 Lonie Paxton LS; 4 Adam Vinatieri K	Reserve lists: 49 Eric Alexander ILB (IR); 68 Tom Ashworth T (IR); 96 Rodney Bailey DE (IR); 60 Wilbert Brown G (Did Not Report); 46 Zeron Flemister TE (IR); 90 Dan Klecko NT/FB (IR); 70 Adrian Klemm T (IR); 24 Ty Law CB (IR); 38 Tyrone Poole CB (IR); 14 P. K. Sam WR (IR) ^{R}; 39 Guss Scott S (IR) ^{R}; 84 Ben Watson TE (IR) ^{R}; Practice squad: 19 Ricky Bryant WR ^{UR}; 32 Kory Chapman RB ^{UR}; 18 Cedric James WR; 47 Justin Kurpeikis LB; 23 Omare Lowe CB; 65 Lance Nimmo T; 69 Buck Rasmussen DE; Notations: R: 2004 Rookie; UR: 2004 Undrafted Rookie; Italicized players are not on the 53-man roster.; 53 active, 9 inactive, 8 practice squad

== Schedule ==
=== Preseason ===
Week	Date	Opponent	Result	Record	Venue	Recap
1	August 13	Philadelphia Eagles	W 24–6	1–0	Gillette Stadium	Recap
2	August 21	at Cincinnati Bengals	L 3–31	1–1	Paul Brown Stadium	Recap
3	August 28	at Carolina Panthers	L 17–20	1–2	Bank of America Stadium	Recap
4	September 2	Jacksonville Jaguars	L 0–31	1–3	Gillette Stadium	Recap

=== Regular season ===
Week	Date	Opponent	Result	Record	Venue	Recap
1	September 9	Indianapolis Colts	W 27–24	1–0	Gillette Stadium	Recap
2	September 19	at Arizona Cardinals	W 23–12	2–0	Sun Devil Stadium	Recap
3	Bye					
4	October 3	at Buffalo Bills	W 31–17	3–0	Ralph Wilson Stadium	Recap
5	October 10	Miami Dolphins	W 24–10	4–0	Gillette Stadium	Recap
6	October 17	Seattle Seahawks	W 30–20	5–0	Gillette Stadium	Recap
7	October 24	New York Jets	W 13–7	6–0	Gillette Stadium	Recap
8	October 31	at Pittsburgh Steelers	L 20–34	6–1	Heinz Field	Recap
9	November 7	at St. Louis Rams	W 40–22	7–1	Edward Jones Dome	Recap
10	November 14	Buffalo Bills	W 29–6	8–1	Gillette Stadium	Recap
11	November 22	at Kansas City Chiefs	W 27–19	9–1	Arrowhead Stadium	Recap
12	November 28	Baltimore Ravens	W 24–3	10–1	Gillette Stadium	Recap
13	December 5	at Cleveland Browns	W 42–15	11–1	Cleveland Browns Stadium	Recap
14	December 12	Cincinnati Bengals	W 35–28	12–1	Gillette Stadium	Recap
15	December 20	at Miami Dolphins	L 28–29	12–2	Pro Player Stadium	Recap
16	December 26	at New York Jets	W 23–7	13–2	Giants Stadium	Recap
17	January 2	San Francisco 49ers	W 21–7	14–2	Gillette Stadium	Recap

=== Postseason ===
Playoff round	Date	Opponent (seed)	Result	Record	Venue	NFL.com recap
Wild Card	Bye					
Divisional	January 16, 2005	Indianapolis Colts (3)	W 20–3	1–0	Gillette Stadium	Recap
AFC Championship	January 23, 2005	at Pittsburgh Steelers (1)	W 41–27	2–0	Heinz Field	Recap
Super Bowl XXXIX	February 6, 2005	at Philadelphia Eagles (N1)	W 24–21	3–0	Alltel Stadium	Recap

=== Game summaries ===
==== Week 1: vs. Indianapolis Colts ====
Quarter	1	2	3	4	Total
Colts	0	17	0	7	24
Patriots	3	10	14	0	27

at Gillette Stadium, Foxborough, Massachusetts

- Game time: 9:00 pm EDT
- Game weather: 73 °F (23 °C), cloudy, warm, humid, showers expected
- Game attendance: 68,756
- Referee: Mike Carey
- TV announcers (ABC): Al Michaels (play-by-play), John Madden (color commentator), and Michele Tafoya (sideline reporter)

Opening the NFL season on a Thursday night with a rematch of the previous season's AFC Championship Game, the Patriots began the game with a heavy reliance on throwing the ball. This led to an opening-drive field goal by Adam Vinatieri and a 3–0 lead. Indianapolis then drove inside the Patriots red zone, but the drive ended with no points when Peyton Manning was intercepted by Tedy Bruschi at the New England 1-yard line. The Patriots responded by turning to their running game with the newly acquired Corey Dillon carrying the ball a number of times on the Patriots next several drives. After Mike Vanderjagt hit his record 42nd consecutive field goal to tie the game, the teams fired up their offenses in the second quarter, with Edgerrin James carrying much of the workload for the Colts. Indianapolis led 17–13 at the half.

Tom Brady answered with touchdown passes to David Patten and Daniel Graham in the third quarter. Meanwhile, James fumbled twice in the red zone to take away scoring chances, and while James was very effective rushing the ball, the turnovers would prove costly. A botched punt return by Deion Branch helped set up a Brandon Stokley touchdown from Peyton Manning in the fourth quarter. In the game's final minute, the score still 27–24, Manning drove the Colts to the Patriots redzone, but was sacked outside the 30-yard line by Willie McGinest. Vanderjagt came on for a 48-yard field goal try; he taunted the Patriots bench by rubbing his fingers in a "money" motion, having connected on 42 straight field goals, but he missed wide right on this try, securing the Patriots win. Going back to the previous season, it was the Patriots' sixteenth consecutive victory.

==== Week 2: at Arizona Cardinals ====
Quarter	1	2	3	4	Total
Patriots	7	7	3	6	23
Cardinals	0	6	6	0	12

at Sun Devil Stadium, Tempe, Arizona

- Game time: 4:15 pm EDT/2:15 pm MDT
- Game weather: 89 °F (32 °C), windy and partly cloudy
- Game attendance: 51,557
- Referee: Tony Corrente
- TV announcers (CBS): Don Criqui (play-by-play), Steve Tasker (color commentator)

Before the game and at halftime, ceremonies took place honoring the late Pat Tillman, who had played for the Cardinals before joining the U.S. Army and had recently been killed by friendly fire in Afghanistan. Tillman's widow spoke along with other dignitaries, and a large banner was hung displaying the bird in the Cardinals' logo shedding a tear.

Both teams struggled at the outset on offense. Midway through the first quarter, the Patriots finally sustained a significant drive after several runs by Corey Dillon. The drive was capped by a Tom Brady touchdown to Daniel Graham. The Patriots appeared to force a punt on the ensuing Cardinals drive, however an offside penalty on Tyrone Poole gave the Cardinals a second chance. However, Josh McCown wasted the chance on the next play when he was intercepted by Eugene Wilson deep in Cardinals territory. Brady then found Graham again to make it 14–0 in favor of New England. However, a fumble by Dillon and an interception by Brady set up the Cardinals with great opportunities to get back in the game. Both chances resulted in sizable losses for the Cardinal offense, on which McCown was sacked a total of five times. Each time Neil Rackers was forced to kick a long field goal, to cut the Patriot lead to 14–6. On the final play of the first half the Patriots attempted a Hail Mary pass, which was intercepted, however on the return, Deion Branch was illegally blocked at the knees. Branch would miss the next nine weeks with a serious knee injury.

In the second half, the Cardinals offensive struggles continued, while the Patriots defense continued to dominate, with Wilson notching his second interception of McCown on the day. Dillon completed a breakout game in which he rushed for 158 yards, and sealed the Patriot win with his work in the fourth quarter.

==== Week 4: at Buffalo Bills ====
Quarter	1	2	3	4	Total
Patriots	10	7	0	14	31
Bills	10	7	0	0	17

at Ralph Wilson Stadium, Orchard Park, New York

- Game time: 1:00 pm EDT
- Game weather: 58 °F (14 °C), sunny
- Game attendance: 72,698
- Referee: Johnny Grier / Scott Green (injury replacement)
- TV announcers (CBS): Jim Nantz (play-by-play), Phil Simms (color commentator), Seth Davis (sideline reporter)

A year after being crushed 31–0 in Ralph Wilson Stadium the Patriots carried a winning streak that had reached 17 games (regular season and playoff). New England led 7–3 early, however it appeared that Terrence McGee intercepted Tom Brady in the end zone to prevent further damage. But referee Scott Green (having taken over for an injured Johnny Grier earlier in the quarter) overturned the play on a Patriots instant replay challenge, allowing the Patriots to kick a field goal and lead 10–3. The Bills responded when McGee ran back the ensuing kickoff 98 yards for the tying touchdown. After a Patriots punt, Bledsoe was intercepted by Tyrone Poole. Brady then connected with David Patten for a 43-yard completion inside the Bills 10-yard line. However, Corey Dillon fumbled two plays later, giving the ball back to Buffalo. Several long rushes by Travis Henry got the Bills off of their goal line, however, the drive stalled and Brian Moorman came in to punt. Moorman dropped the snap, however he picked it up and ran all the way to the New England 41-yard line for a first down. On the next play Drew Bledsoe threw a touchdown to Eric Moulds. The Patriots responded and tied the game on a David Patten touchdown catch at the end of the half. In the fourth quarter, an offside penalty against the Bills on a Patriots field goal attempt gave New England a first down. The Patriots then went ahead on a Tom Brady touchdown to Daniel Graham, the fourth touchdown in three games for Graham. The Patriots then iced the game when Bledsoe was strip-sacked and Richard Seymour ran the ball 68 yards for the score, a 31–17 Patriots win.

With the win, the Patriots became just the fourth NFL team to win 18 consecutive games.

==== Week 5: vs. Miami Dolphins ====
Quarter	1	2	3	4	Total
Dolphins	0	7	3	0	10
Patriots	7	10	7	0	24

at Gillette Stadium, Foxborough, Massachusetts

- Game time: 1:00 pm EDT
- Game weather: 64 °F (18 °C), mostly cloudy and cool
- Game attendance: 68,756
- Referee: Bernie Kukar
- TV announcers (CBS): Dick Enberg (play-by-play), Dan Dierdorf (color commentator), Armen Keteyian (sideline reporter)

The Patriots played host to the winless Miami Dolphins, who at the time were winless and had the worst offense statistically in the NFL. With Olindo Mare sidelined by a calf injury, the Dolphins called on wide receiver and kick returner Wes Welker into service as a kicker for the game. With Welker kicking, the Patriots received good field position to start the game, but Tom Brady was intercepted by Patrick Surtain. After an exchange of punts, Jay Fiedler was intercepted by Randall Gay, setting the Patriots up deep in Miami territory. Brady then found Daniel Graham for a touchdown, Graham's fifth in four games, and the Patriots took a 7–0 lead. The Dolphins last-ranked offense struggled to make any significant plays for the first quarter and a half. However, after Adam Vinatieri missed a 47-yard field goal, his first of the season, the Dolphins inserted third stringer Brock Forsey at running back and began to move the ball, with Fiedler throwing his first touchdown of the season to Chris Chambers, cutting the deficit to 10–7. Welker kicked the extra point, the first of his career. With three minutes left in the first half, punter Matt Turk decided to run for a first down after the snap led him to the left, however he was tackled short of the line to gain giving the Patriots excellent field position. After a personal foul on Dolphins safety Sammy Knight, Brady found David Givens on a 6-yard touchdown to put the Patriots up 17–7 at the half.

The Dolphins received the second half kickoff, but immediately turned the ball over when Fiedler fumbled and Ty Law jumped on the ball. The Patriots then moved inside the Miami 5-yard line on a 36-yard rush by Corey Dillon. Rabih Abdullah then rushed for a 3-yard score to put the Patriots up 24–7. The Dolphins next drive reached the red zone but stalled, forcing Welker to attempt a 29-yard field goal. He converted on his first and only NFL field goal, cutting the deficit to 24–10. After a New England punt, Miami again drove into Patriots territory, but failed on a fourth down pass attempt when Fiedler unsuccessfully tried to find Derrius Thompson in the end zone. The Dolphins got the ball back with three minutes to play and after a long Fiedler completion to Marty Booker, the Dolphins had a last chance to get back in the game. However, after a failed quarterback sneak, Fiedler was sacked by Rodney Harrison and had to leave the game in pain. A. J. Feeley came in at quarterback but failed to convert on third or fourth down, giving the Patriots a record 19th consecutive win.

==== Week 6: vs. Seattle Seahawks ====
Quarter	1	2	3	4	Total
Seahawks	0	6	3	11	20
Patriots	10	10	0	10	30

at Gillette Stadium, Foxborough, Massachusetts

- Game time: 1:00 pm EDT
- Game weather: 50 °F (10 °C), partly cloudy and windy
- Game attendance: 68,756
- Referee: Terry McAulay
- TV announcers (Fox): Dick Stockton (play-by-play), Troy Aikman and Cris Collinsworth (color commentators), Pam Oliver (sideline reporter)

Fox NFL Sunday traveled on-location to Gillette Stadium, with Game 4 of the ALCS also airing on Fox later on the same night involving the local Boston Red Sox. With a mostly national audience watching, the Patriots hosted the Seattle Seahawks. This game marked the end of an 11-year hiatus between the Patriots and Seahawks dating back to 1993.

On the opening drive of the game, Seahawks quarterback Matt Hasselbeck (a native of Massachusetts who played college football at Boston College) was intercepted by Willie McGinest after his pass was tipped by Richard Seymour. Seattle native Corey Dillon would score for New England, putting the home team up 7–0. The Seahawks' second possession ended the same way as their first did; this time Hasselbeck was intercepted by Ty Law. The Patriots again took advantage, with Adam Vinatieri kicking a field goal to put New England up 10–0. After several Seahawk penalties forced a punt, the Patriots drove methodically down the field with a sizeable rush from Dillon and receptions by David Givens and Kevin Faulk. The drive was capped by a Tom Brady touchdown pass to David Patten to put the Patriots up 17–0. On the ensuing drive, the Seahawks would finally get on the scoreboard with a Josh Brown field goal to make it 17–3. Both teams would then kick field goals before the half, sending New England to the locker room with a 20–6 lead.

After a New England punt to start the second half, the Seahawks drove into Patriots territory. Shaun Alexander fumbled inside the Patriots 40-yard line, but the Seahawks were able to recover the ball and eventually settled for another field goal by Brown. On the fumble play, Patriots starting cornerback Tyrone Poole suffered an injury to his already ailing knee, and would not play meaningful snaps again all season. After three quarters, the Patriots led 20–9. On the first possession of the fourth quarter, Brady scrambled for a first down in Seattle territory but was hit by Michael Boulware, knocking the ball (and Brady's helmet) free. The Seahawks recovered, but were forced to punt. However, on the ensuing Patriots drive, Brady was intercepted by Boulware in Patriots territory, setting up a 9-yard touchdown run by Alexander. Hasselbeck then found Jeremy Stevens for a two-point conversion to make the deficit 20–17. New England responded with a lengthy drive ending with a Vinatieri field goal to go up by 6 points with under 7 minutes to play. The Seahawks drove deep into New England territory with a chance to take the lead, but Hasselbeck was assessed a costly intentional grounding penalty and Brown had to kick a field goal. Thus, the Patriots took the ball back with 3 minutes to play leading 23–20, both teams having all three timeouts. Facing a 3rd down and 8 from his own 39-yard line, Brady threw a deep pass that Bethel Johnson caught on a full-out diving leap inside the Seahawks 15-yard line. Dillon then sealed the win with a 9-yard touchdown run, which put him over 100 yards for the day. The win was the 20th in a row for New England. The Patriots would not host the Seahawks again until 2016.

==== Week 7: vs. New York Jets ====
Quarter	1	2	3	4	Total
Jets	0	7	0	0	7
Patriots	3	10	0	0	13

at Gillette Stadium, Foxborough, Massachusetts

- Game time: 4:05 pm EDT
- Game weather: 46 °F (8 °C), cloudy, windy, occasional drizzle
- Game attendance: 68,756
- Referee: Walt Anderson
- TV announcers (CBS): Jim Nantz (play-by-play), Phil Simms (color commentator), Bonnie Bernstein (sideline reporter)

The Patriots and Jets both came into the game undefeated at 5–0 on the season, with the division lead in the AFC East on the line. On the first drive of the game, the Patriots moved into Jets territory on a series of Tom Brady pass plays (including one to reserve linebacker Dan Klecko). The drive would end with Adam Vinatieri kicking a 41-yard field goal to put New England up 3–0. The Jets responded by driving into the Patriots red zone, but on 3rd down and 1, Jets fullback Jerald Sowell fumbled after catching a screen pass from Chad Pennington. Randall Gay jumped on the ball for New England preventing the Jets from scoring. The Patriots then drove near midfield but were forced to punt, however on the punt the Jets were penalized for having 12 players on the field giving New England a first down. Brady took advantage by throwing a 42-yard pass play to David Givens, leading to another Vinatieri field goal and a 6–0 lead. The Jets responded with a lengthy drive taking up more than 7 minutes and finishing with Pennington scrambling for a 1-yard touchdown run to put the Jets in front 7–6 with less than 2 minutes to play in the first half. However Brady completed passes to Bethel Johnson and Kevin Faulk to move into Jets territory with under a minute remaining. Then, after a costly roughing-the-passer penalty on Jets defensive lineman Dewayne Robertson, Brady found David Patten in the end zone with 5 seconds left in the half to take the lead 13–7.

The third quarter consisted entirely of punts, three by the Jets and two by New England. The Patriots began the fourth quarter with the ball and drove into Jets territory, but Klecko fumbled after making his second catch of the day and Eric Barton recovered for the Jets. However, the ensuing drive would stall and the Jets were forced to punt for the fourth consecutive drive. New England would cross midfield but Brady was sacked on 3rd down and 10 forcing the Patriots to punt. This gave the Jets the ball back with just over 7 minutes to play trailing by 6 points. Jets head coach Herm Edwards decided to go for a 4th and inches deep in his own territory, which turned out to be successful after a quarterback sneak by Pennington. The Jets crossed midfield with just over 4 minutes left after a Pennington pass to Justin McCareins. On 2nd down and 5 at the Patriots 27-yard line, Pennington threw to the end zone where McCareins cradled the ball for a split second before Asante Samuel broke up the potential go-ahead touchdown. It would turn out to be the Jets best opportunity, as NFL rushing leader Curtis Martin was stuffed by Willie McGinest for a loss on third down, and Pennington's fourth down throw into triple coverage to Wayne Chrebet was broken up by Rodney Harrison. The Patriots took over on downs and ran out the remaining two minutes to seal their 21st consecutive win.

==== Week 8: at Pittsburgh Steelers ====
Quarter	1	2	3	4	Total
Patriots	3	7	3	7	20
Steelers	21	3	10	0	34

at Heinz Field, Pittsburgh, Pennsylvania

- Game time: 4:15 pm EST
- Game weather: 64 °F (18 °C), fair
- Game attendance: 64,737
- Referee: Walt Coleman
- TV announcers (CBS): Jim Nantz (play-by-play), Phil Simms (color commentator), Bonnie Bernstein (sideline reporter)

The Steelers began the game with a three and out, giving the ball to a banged up Patriot offense. While Troy Brown returned to the lineup, Deion Branch remained inactive, and Corey Dillon was also inactive for the first time all season with a minor leg injury. The Patriots quickly crossed midfield on a Tom Brady completion to David Patten, and got 15 extra yards after Steelers safety Troy Polamalu was called for grasping Patten's face mask. New England would settle for an Adam Vinatieri field goal and a 3–0 lead. The Steelers again had a three and out, but the Patriots would be unable to take advantage this time, and were forced to punt as well. On the ensuing possession, the Steelers began to move the ball. They reached midfield when rookie quarterback Ben Roethlisberger found Hines Ward for 23 yards. On the play, Patriots starting cornerback Ty Law suffered a season ending foot injury. The Patriots' other starting cornerback Tyrone Poole had been lost for the season two weeks prior, leaving the New England secondary vulnerable. Roethlisberger immediately took advantage, burning Law's replacement Randall Gay on a 47-yard touchdown to Plaxico Burress. On the first play of the Patriots' ensuing drive, Brady was strip-sacked by Joey Porter leading to another Roethlisberger touchdown to Burress. The Patriots next possession again ended after one play, as Brady was intercepted by Deshea Townsend who returned the ball 39 yards for a touchdown. This made the score 21–3 Pittsburgh after one quarter.

The Steelers would remain in control for the whole game. Brady tossed two touchdowns to David Givens, one in the second quarter and one in the fourth. However, the battered Patriots defense could not contain Duce Staley, who rushed for 125 yards, and Jerome Bettis, who rushed for 65 yards and notched a touchdown in the third quarter. Jeff Reed also added two field goals to secure a dominating Steelers victory by 14 points. Pittsburgh became the first team to beat the Patriots since Washington had defeated New England in Week 4 of the 2003 season.

==== Week 9: at St. Louis Rams ====
Quarter	1	2	3	4	Total
Patriots	6	13	14	7	40
Rams	0	14	0	8	22

at Edward Jones Dome, St. Louis, Missouri

- Game time: 4:15 pm EST/3:15 pm CST
- Game weather: Played indoors, domed stadium
- Game attendance: 66,107
- Referee: Ed Hochuli
- TV announcers (CBS): Jim Nantz (play-by-play), Phil Simms (color commentator), Bonnie Bernstein (sideline reporter)

This was the first meeting between the Patriots and Rams since Super Bowl XXXVI. Corey Dillon returned from injury to start at running back for the Patriots, providing a much needed offensive boost. Dillon's presence was felt immediately, as he opened the game with a 15-yard run. A long screen pass from Tom Brady to Patrick Pass set up an Adam Vinatieri field goal. The Rams responded with a Marc Bulger pass to Brandon Manumaleuna. However, on the play, Patriots cornerback Asante Samuel injured his shoulder and was lost for the game. With starters Ty Law and Tyrone Poole already out for the season, Samuel and Randall Gay had been promoted to starters, but the injury to Samuel moved Dexter Reid up the depth chart. The Patriots did not have any other cornerbacks to replace Reid at reserve corner, so wide receiver Troy Brown played both sides of the ball for the remainder of the game whenever the Patriots ran a nickel defense. After the reception by Manumaleuna and the injury to Samuel, the Rams were left with 3rd down and 5 but chose not to attack the vulnerable secondary and were forced to punt. New England's drive resulted a three and out, and punter Josh Miller came in, but Shaun McDonald muffed the punt twice and Lonie Paxton recovered for the Patriots deep in Rams territory. Vinatieri would kick another field goal to put New England up 6–0. After a Rams punt, the Patriots took possession at their own 6-yard line. However, Brady was strip-sacked by Damione Lewis and Leonard Little recovered in the end zone to put the Rams up 7–6. The Patriots responded by driving 66 yards and scoring a touchdown on a Brady pass to linebacker Mike Vrabel, in the game as an extra blocker. On the ensuing Rams possession, Marshall Faulk picked up a key first down before Bulger found Manumaleuna on a 49-yard pass play to move the ball to the Patriots 11-yard line. Bulger then hit Isaac Bruce on a short pass and Bruce ran for the touchdown to put St. Louis back in front 14–13. Again New England would respond, with Brady finding David Givens on a 50-yard pass play to move inside the Rams 30-yard line. Vinatieri would kick a 45-yard field goal to put New England in front 16–14. The Rams quickly advanced downfield on two long catches by Torry Holt, but Bulger was then strip-sacked by Willie McGinest on 3rd down, and Jarvis Green recovered for New England. The Patriots attempted to drive downfield, and were assisted by a roughing-the-passer penalty called on Little for a hit on Brady. Vinatieri would kick another field goal to put the Patriots in front 19–14 at the end of a wild first half.

The Rams went three-and-out to start the second half. The Patriots then drove deep into St. Louis territory but the drive stalled inside the 10-yard line and Vinatieri was brought out for a 22-yard attempt. However, in lining up for the field goal, Brown moved to the far left side of the formation where the Rams forgot about him. Vinatieri then took a direct snap and lobbed an easy pass for Brown to score a touchdown on the fake field goal and take a 26–14 lead. On the second play of the ensuing Rams possession, Bulger's pass was tipped by McGinest and intercepted by Roman Phifer who returned the ball to the St. Louis 21-yard line. Four plays later, Dillon walked in for a touchdown, putting New England in front 33–14. The Rams responded with a Bulger touchdown pass to Holt, followed by a Marshall Faulk rush for a two-point conversion. This cut the Patriot lead to 33–22, with 14 minutes left to play. After an exchange of punts, the Patriots drove down the field, taking 5 1/2 minutes off the clock. Led by Dillon, who completed his fourth 100-yard performance of the year, New England capped the drive and put away the win with a 4-yard touchdown pass from Brady to Bethel Johnson.

Brown would finish the game with 3 passes defensed on defense, and he also caught passes on offense and special teams. Samuel returned late in the fourth quarter. The win capped a remarkable team performance by New England with Brown, Vrabel and Vinatieri each contributing in multiple phases of the game.

==== Week 10: vs. Buffalo Bills ====
Quarter	1	2	3	4	Total
Bills	0	0	6	0	6
Patriots	3	17	3	6	29

at Gillette Stadium, Foxborough, Massachusetts

- Game time: 8:30 pm EST
- Game weather: 40 °F (4 °C), clear and cool
- Game attendance: 68,756
- Referee: Tom White
- TV announcers (ESPN): Mike Patrick (play-by-play), Joe Theismann and Paul Maguire (color commentators), Suzy Kolber (sideline reporter)

The World Series winning Boston Red Sox were honored at Gillette Stadium before the game and at halftime. Meanwhile, the Patriots hosted their division rivals who they had beaten in Week 3.

The opening kickoff was received by Terrence McGee, who was originally ruled to have gained possession at his own 1-yard line before taking a knee in the end zone. This would have placed the ball at the Bills 1-yard line to start the game, however coach Mike Mularkey challenged the play successfully, allowing the Bills to start at their own 20-yard line. However, the drive stalled just after crossing midfield and Buffalo punted. The Patriots then drove deep into Bills territory behind the running of Corey Dillon, leading to a field goal by Adam Vinatieri. After the teams exchanged punts, Drew Bledsoe was intercepted by Eugene Wilson inside the New England 5-yard line. The Patriots turned their field position around and drove 92 yards inside the Bills 5-yard line, but again settled for a field goal. After yet another Bills punt, the Patriots drove down the field with several passes from Tom Brady to David Givens. Brady then finished the drive with a touchdown throw to a wide open David Patten. On the ensuing Buffalo possession, Bledsoe was intercepted by Teddy Bruschi, who returned the ball over 40 yards to the Bills 27-yard line. Three plays later, Brady found Christian Fauria for a touchdown. After the kickoff, Bledsoe was sacked by Tully Banta-Cain making the score 20–0 at halftime.

New England's domination would continue after halftime. The Patriots received the second half kickoff and drove down the field, aided by a drive-extending holding penalty on Buffalo's London Fletcher. The drive ended inside the 5-yard line but Vinatieri made a chip-shot field goal to extend the New England lead to 23–0. The Bills were then forced to punt with their first second half possession. After a Patriots three-and-out, the Bills yet again were forced to punt. On New England's possession, the officials decided to pick up the flag on a defensive penalty that would have extended the drive on third down, and the Patriots punted again. This time Jonathan Smith returned the punt 70 yards for a touchdown, getting Buffalo on the scoreboard. The Bills had two chances at a two-point conversion after a New England penalty, but could not convert. The Patriots then responded by opening the 4th quarter with a Vinatieri field goal to make it 26–6. Bledsoe's humiliation was then completed when he was intercepted by Patriots wide receiver Troy Brown playing defensive back. Brady was then picked off by Nate Clements, but the Bills failed on fourth down when Bledsoe threw a pass to Eric Moulds that led him out of bounds. Dillon then drove the Patriots to another field goal, putting Dillon over 100 yards for the fifth time on the season. On the ensuing Bills possession, Bledsoe was replaced by first round draft pick J. P. Losman. Bledsoe finished the night with just 76 passing yards and 4 interceptions. Losman was greeted on his first NFL series by being strip-sacked by Rosevelt Colvin, with the fumble recovered for New England by Roman Phifer. After Rohan Davey replaced Brady, the Patriots turned the ball over on downs. In the game's final seconds, Losman was intercepted by Banta-Cain. It was the sixth turnover of the night for the Bills offense, an offense that did not score a single point in the game, with Buffalo's only score coming from special teams.

==== Week 11: at Kansas City Chiefs ====
Quarter	1	2	3	4	Total
Patriots	7	10	7	3	27
Chiefs	10	0	3	6	19

at Arrowhead Stadium, Kansas City, Missouri

- Game time: 9:00 pm EST/8:00 pm CST
- Game weather: 45 °F (7 °C), overcast
- Game attendance: 78,431
- Referee: Bill Leavy
- TV announcers (ABC): Al Michaels (play-by-play), John Madden (color commentator), and Michele Tafoya (sideline reporter)

Deion Branch finally made his return to the Patriots lineup after suffering a knee injury in Week 2. Branch made an immediate impact, catching a Tom Brady pass on 3rd down and 15 on the Patriots' opening drive that moved New England to the Chiefs 5-yard line. Corey Dillon then rushed for a touchdown on the next play to put the Patriots up 7–0. The Chiefs were without NFL rushing touchdown leader Priest Holmes, due to a muscle strain. Derrick Blaylock filled in at running back. The Chiefs offense got off to a good start with Trent Green finding Tony Gonzalez deep in Patriots territory, leading to a Lawrence Tynes field goal. New England then suffered a three and out, the first punt by either side. The Chiefs took advantage with Green tossing a 65-yard touchdown to Eddie Kennison, who beat fourth-string corner Earthwind Moreland. After another New England three and out, the Chiefs began to drive with several fist downs as the first quarter ended with Kansas City leading 10–7. However, after the change in quarter, the K.C. drive stalled and the Chiefs were forced to punt. The Patriots then came back with a long drive bolstered by long Brady passes to Branch and Troy Brown. A 1-yard touchdown run by Dillon put the Patriots in front 14–10. After a Chiefs punt, a 48-yard completion from Brady to Daniel Graham set up an Adam Vinatieri field goal. The Chiefs drove downfield in the final minutes of the first half, helped by a 4th down conversion. However, Green was intercepted in the end zone by Rodney Harrison with just 42 seconds left in the half, keeping the Chiefs down by 7 at the break.

The Chiefs took the second half kickoff and proceeded to drive into the Patriots red zone, taking more than 8 minutes and converting three 3rd downs along the way including a 3rd and 17 conversion on a Green pass to Johnnie Morton. However, the drive stalled when Blaylock couldn't convert a 3rd and 1, forcing Kansas City to kick a field goal and cut the deficit to 17–13. On the Patriots' first possession of the second half, Brady found David Patten on a 46-yard pass play to move inside the Chiefs 30-yard line. On the next play, Branch displayed his return to good health by catching a slant pass and making numerous cutbacks on his way to the end zone for a touchdown that put the Patriots up 24–13. The Chiefs proceeded to once again drive into Patriots territory but were forced to punt. On the ensuing Patriots possession, New England drove inside the Chiefs 10-yard line, but Greg Wesley stripped the ball from Dillon, with Lional Dalton recovering for the Chiefs at their own 3-yard line. The Chiefs subsequently drove 97 yards to score a touchdown on another pass from Green to Kennison. However a two-point attempt failed when Eugene Wilson batted away Green's throw to Kennison, keeping the Patriots in the lead 24–19. The Patriots then ran the clock inside the two-minute warning on their way to a field goal, forcing the Chiefs two burn two of their timeouts. Kansas City got the ball back at their own 32-yard line with 1:39 to play down by 8 points. However, the drive never materialized and Green was sacked by Willie McGinest on 4th down to seal a Patriots win.

The win ended the Patriots' seven-game road winless streak against the Chiefs, beating them in Kansas City for the first time since the 1964 season.

==== Week 12: vs. Baltimore Ravens ====
Quarter	1	2	3	4	Total
Ravens	0	3	0	0	3
Patriots	0	3	6	15	24

at Gillette Stadium, Foxborough, Massachusetts

- Game time: 4:15 pm EST
- Game weather: 52 °F (11 °C), rain, heavy at times
- Game attendance: 68,756
- Referee: Scott Green
- TV announcers (CBS): Jim Nantz (play-by-play), Phil Simms (color commentator), Bonnie Bernstein (sideline reporter)

The Ravens brought their always stout defense to Gillette Stadium. The game was played in a driving rainstorm, featuring heavy rain in addition to strong wind gusts. The field, real grass at the time, quickly turned into a muddy mess. The Ravens were not helped by the fact that running back Jamal Lewis was unavailable. Chester Taylor replaced Lewis as the starter. Because of the conditions, offense was virtually nonexistent. The first half began with each team punting. Ravens quarterback Kyle Boller was then intercepted by Randall Gay, but the Patriots were forced to punt. The Ravens would then punt again, followed by several Corey Dillon runs and a Tom Brady pass to Deion Branch that set up a field goal by Adam Vinatieri, putting New England up 3–0. The teams then exchanged punts four times each. In the final minute of the half, Boller drove the Ravens into field goal range, helped by two Patriot personal fouls, and a Matt Stover chip-shot made it 3–3 at halftime.

The sloppy play continued after halftime. With the rain picking up in intensity, the field conditions continued to get worse. Vinatieri booted another field goal to start the second half, and after a Ravens punt, tacked on his third of the game to make it 9–3 New England after three quarters. After another Ravens punt, Dillon, who rushed for 123 yards in the game, scored on a 1-yard run. The Patriots then attempted a two-point conversion, again turning to Dillon, who plunged into the end zone to make it 17–3. After the kickoff, Boller was sacked for a sizable loss by Ted Johnson. On the next play, Tedy Bruschi also sacked Boller, who lost control of the sopping wet football. Taylor tried to recover it for Baltimore but accidentally kicked it into his own end zone, where Jarvis Green jumped on it for a Patriot touchdown.

New England's defense held the Ravens to 124 yards of total offense (just one more yard than Dillon had rushing on his own), forcing two turnovers and not allowing a touchdown, while scoring a touchdown of its own.

==== Week 13: at Cleveland Browns ====
Quarter	1	2	3	4	Total
Patriots	14	7	21	0	42
Browns	0	7	0	8	15

at Cleveland Browns Stadium, Cleveland, Ohio

- Game time: 1:00 pm EST
- Game weather: 46 °F (8 °C), cloudy, sunny
- Game attendance: 73,028
- Referee: Bill Carollo
- TV announcers (CBS): Kevin Harlan (play-by-play), Randy Cross (color commentator)

The 3–8 Browns came into the game having just replaced former head coach Butch Davis with Terry Robiskie. Robiskie decided to start rookie Luke McCown at quarterback, his first NFL start. The Patriots had beaten Luke's older brother Josh earlier in the season in Week 2 with their defeat of Arizona.

New England got off to a flying start when Bethel Johnson returned Phil Dawson's opening kickoff 93 yards for a touchdown. After the teams exchanged punts, McCown was intercepted by Rodney Harrison deep in Patriots territory. New England then drove 96 yards, helped by a 25-yard Tom Brady completion to Christian Fauria. The drive ended with a short Corey Dillon touchdown to make it 14–0. The Browns then reached Patriots territory but failed on a 4th down attempt and turned the ball over again. The Patriots were then helped by a Lewis Sanders pass interference inside the Cleveland 10-yard line followed by an incidental face mask against Warrick Holdman. Dillon capped the drive with his second touchdown of the day to make the score 21–0. After a Browns punt, the Patriots decided to attempt a 4th down conversion at the Browns 30-yard line with just over two minutes remaining in the half, but Patrick Pass was short of the line to gain, turning the ball back to the Browns. Cleveland finally got on the scoreboard in the final minute of the half with a 16-yard McCown pass to Antonio Bryant.

The Browns took the second half kickoff, but William Green was stripped of the ball by Richard Seymour. Randall Gay picked it up and was held back temporarily by Willie McGinest to ensure McGinest could throw Gay a block. Gay would follow McGinest's block and score to make it 28–7, Robiskie benched Green after the fumble. After a Browns three-and-out, the Patriots drove to the Cleveland 10-yard line where Kevin Faulk ran for a touchdown to make the score 35–7. On the ensuing Browns possession, Dexter Reid stripped Steve Heiden and then recovered the fumble for New England. Then, on 3rd and 22, Brady found David Patten on a 44-yard touchdown to make the score 42–7. The Patriots defense turned in another terrific performance, forcing three turnovers, stopping a fourth down attempt, and completely shutting down Green and McCown.

==== Week 14: vs. Cincinnati Bengals ====
Quarter	1	2	3	4	Total
Bengals	0	14	7	7	28
Patriots	7	21	7	0	35

at Gillette Stadium, Foxborough, Massachusetts

- Game time: 1:00 pm EST
- Game weather: 39 °F (4 °C), partly cloudy
- Game attendance: 68,756
- Referee: Jeff Triplette
- TV announcers (CBS): Dick Enberg (play-by-play), Dan Dierdorf (color commentator), Armen Keteyian (sideline reporter)

On the opening possession for the Bengals, rookie quarterback Carson Palmer found T. J. Houshmandzadeh on several passes to move into the Patriots red zone. However, Rudi Johnson had the ball knocked out and Willie McGinest recovered at New England's own 10-yard line. The Patriots offense started hot. First, Tom Brady found Deion Branch over the middle for a sizable completion. Then Corey Dillon, playing for the first time against the Bengals, a team with which he had spent a frustrating seven years, rumbled for 17 yards. Brady then found David Patten inside the Bengal 30-yard line. After a successful 4th down and inches conversion, Dillon scored on his old team to put his new team in front 7–0. After an exchange of punts, Palmer threw a short touchdown pass to Matt Schobel to tie the game. However, Brady responded by tossing a 48-yard touchdown pass to Patten, putting New England in front 14–7. Palmer was then intercepted by Asante Samuel, who returned it for a touchdown to make it 21–7. Palmer would recover and threw a 6-yard touchdown to Chad Johnson with 2:31 left in the half, cutting the deficit to 21–14. On the ensuing kickoff, a long return by Bethel Johnson set up a 4-yard touchdown run by Kevin Faulk, putting New England up 28–14 at halftime.

The Patriots opened the second half with the ball. Brady managed a 9-yard completion to Patrick Pass while sitting on the ground after tripping. Brady then ran a quarterback sneak to complete a most unusual first down. He would cap the drive with a 17-yard touchdown pass to Christian Fauria, putting New England in front 35–14. Cincinnati would respond, running a fake-field goal play on which Bengals punter Kyle Larson ran for a 19-yard touchdown. This cut the Bengals deficit to 35–21 after three quarters. However, on the play before the fake-field goal, Palmer suffered a leg injury after being hit by Richard Seymour, and was replaced by Jon Kitna. After a Patriots punt, Kitna drove the Bengals into the red zone, but was intercepted in the end zone by Troy Brown, again playing defensive back. After an exchange of punts, the Patriots drove into Bengal territory, however the drive stalled. Bill Belichick decided to try a fake punt, but Larry Izzo failed to reach the line to gain, turning the ball back to the Bengals. Starting cornerback Tyrone Poole, who had not played since week 6, entered the game as a nickelback on the following series, but with his knee too weak to play effectively, Poole was shut down for the season following the game, leaving Samuel and Randall Gay as the starting corners. The drive ended with Kitna throwing a 27-yard touchdown to Kelley Washington, but the Patriots offense was able to run out the remaining three minutes.

With the win, the Patriots clinched the AFC East title. Dillon clinched his first ever playoff appearance with a solid performance against his old team, whose inability to win and qualify for the playoffs was a major factor behind his trade to New England.

==== Week 15: at Miami Dolphins ====
Quarter	1	2	3	4	Total
Patriots	7	7	7	7	28
Dolphins	7	3	7	12	29

at Pro Player Stadium, Miami Gardens, Florida

- Game time: 9:00 pm EST
- Game weather: 52 °F (11 °C), clear
- Game attendance: 73,629
- Referee: Walt Anderson
- TV announcers (ABC): Al Michaels (play-by-play), John Madden (color commentator), Michele Tafoya (sideline reporter)

The defending Super Bowl champion Patriots entered the game at 12–1, having clinched their second consecutive AFC East title the previous week behind the passing of two-time Super Bowl MVP Tom Brady. Meanwhile, the Dolphins came into the contest at 2–11, with the worst record in the AFC. The Dolphins did have a stout defense, led by defensive coordinator-turned-interim head coach Jim Bates. However, the Miami offense was very poor, after Pro Bowl running back Ricky Williams unexpectedly retired before the season. The offense was instead led by a rotation of Miami's starting quarterback from previous years Jay Fiedler, and newcomer A. J. Feeley. Fiedler had lost to New England earlier in the year, so for this game Bates chose Feeley to start. In an additional attempt to turn their fortunes, the normally conservative and traditional Dolphins decided to wear unusual bright orange uniforms for the nationally televised ABC Monday Night Football game.

The Patriots took the opening kickoff and immediately drove down the field. Corey Dillon had a 19-yard run and David Patten had a key catch. Brady would cap it with a 32-yard lob pass to Kevin Faulk for a touchdown, quickly making it 7–0 New England. A Jarvis Green third down sack of Feeley forced Miami into a three-and-out on their opening drive. However, the Patriots were forced to punt. Dolphins returner Wes Welker, who had kicked a field goal in the Dolphins week 5 game against New England, returned the Josh Miller punt 71 yards to the Patriots 2-yard line. Future Patriot Sammy Morris dove in for the score to tie the game. Both teams then punted twice, ending the first quarter tied 7–7. Despite having 7 points, Miami had -2 yards of total offense in the first quarter, continuing a season-long trend for that unit. The Patriots began their first drive of the second quarter at midfield. Running the ball 10 times with Dillon, Faulk and Patrick Pass, New England engaged in a 6 and a half minute march, finished off by Dillon's 3-yard touchdown plunge. Miami responded on their next drive by holding the ball for 5 minutes and finishing with an Olindo Mare field goal, cutting the deficit to 14–10. On the ensuing New England drive, Brady threw deep but was intercepted by Sammy Knight. The Dolphins could not do anything with the possession and after a punt and a New England kneeldown the half ended with the Patriots up 14–10.

The Dolphins started the second half with the ball, but immediately turned it over on a failed trick play when Marty Booker dropped a hand-off from Chris Chambers and Vincent Wilfork jumped on the ball for New England. The Patriots reached the Miami red zone on a Brady completion to Patten, but then Brady was intercepted by Knight for the second time. Knight returned the ball to his own 40-yard line, and had a post-possession unnecessary roughness penalty on the Patriots' Matt Light tacked on. The Dolphins took advantage, driving deep into New England territory and scoring a touchdown when Travis Minor flipped into the end zone from 2 yards out, giving Miami a 17–14 lead. The Patriots responded with a drive assisted by two Miami personal fouls, and retook a 21–17 lead on a 2-yard touchdown pass from Brady to Dillon. The third quarter would end with the Dolphins going three-and-out after an attempted emergency shovel pass from Feeley to Morris went sour. The Patriots began driving as the fourth quarter started. Deion Branch had a 27-yard reception to get the Patriots near midfield but were stopped on a 3rd down and 1 and had to punt. Miami was forced to bring on Matt Turk for another punt, giving New England the ball at their own 35-yard line. A third down catch by Branch and longs run by Faulk and Dillon set up a 2-yard Brady touchdown pass to Daniel Graham.

Thus the Patriots had an 11-point lead with just 3:59 to play in the game. Miami, trailing 28–17, took possession at their own 32-yard line. They immediately proceeded in hurry-up offense, with Feeley finding Morris on a 16-yard screen pass. After several short passes, Morris picked up another 15 yards on a handoff. After reaching the Patriots 19-yard line, Feeley attempted to find Chambers in the end zone, and instead drew a pass interference penalty on Rodney Harrison, setting Miami up at the 1-yard line. Morris then dove across the goal line for the touchdown. However, Feeley's two-point pass to Booker fell incomplete. This left Miami down by 5 with 2:07 to play. On the ensuing kickoff return, Patten made the mistake of running out of bounds before the 2-minute warning could occur, thus leaving Miami the warning plus all three timeouts and 2:03. After an incompletion and a short run, the Patriots faced 3rd down and 9. Brady was pressured and was being brought down by Jason Taylor, but threw the ball off to the right as he was falling to the ground. The wild pass was intercepted by Brendon Ayanbadejo at the New England 21-yard line, setting up the Dolphins with two timeouts and a chance to win.

The Dolphins failed to net any yardage, with a penalty made up for by a completion, setting up a 4th down and 10 from the Patriots 21-yard line. Both teams used timeouts before the play, building up the tension, and players for both teams could be seen on television with their heads in their hands. Feeley threw a floater off his back foot for Derrius Thompson, who was being covered by wide receiver Troy Brown filling in at cornerback. Thompson reeled in the catch for the touchdown to put Miami in front 29–28 with 1:23 to play. A two-point conversion attempt failed, meaning Adam Vinatieri could win it with a field goal. However Brady was sacked by David Bowens and then was intercepted by Arturo Freeman, sealing the Dolphin win. Afterwards, Freeman engaged in a "chest bump" with coach Jim Bates, who was set to interview for the permanent head coaching position the next day (a position he ultimately lost to Nick Saban).

New England had previously won 37 consecutive games when leading at the start of the 4th quarter. Brady had the worst statistical performance of his career, with 4 interceptions, including the costly sack-interception. The story of the 2–11 Dolphins upsetting the 12–1 defending champion Patriots made national headlines, and was one of the great upsets of the year in 2004. The 11 point comeback with under 4 minutes to play remains one of the largest in NFL history with so little time remaining.

- Scoring
  - NE – K. Faulk 32 pass from T. Brady (PAT: Vinatieri kick) NE 7–0
  - MIA – S. Morris 2 run (PAT: Mare kick) TIED 7–7
  - NE – C. Dillon 3 run (PAT: Vinatieri kick) NE 14–7
  - MIA – O. Mare field goal NE 14–10
  - MIA – T. Minor 3 run (PAT: Mare kick) MIA 17–14
  - NE – C. Dillon 5 pass from T. Brady (PAT: Vinatieri kick) NE 21–17
  - NE – D. Graham 2 pass from T. Brady (PAT: Vinatieri kick) NE 28–17
  - MIA – S. Morris 1 run (PAT: Incomplete pass from A. J. Feeley) NE 28–23
  - MIA – D. Thompson 21 pass from A. J. Feeley (PAT: Incomplete pass from A. J. Feeley) MIA 29–28

==== Week 16: at New York Jets ====
Quarter	1	2	3	4	Total
Patriots	0	13	3	7	23
Jets	0	0	0	7	7

at Giants Stadium, East Rutherford, New Jersey

- Game time: 4:05 pm EST
- Game weather: 30 °F (−1 °C), overcast
- Game attendance: 77,975
- Referee: Bernie Kukar
- TV announcers (CBS): Jim Nantz (play-by-play), Phil Simms (color commentator), Bonnie Bernstein (sideline reporter)

The Patriots bounced back from their loss very quickly. On the first drive of the game Chad Pennington was intercepted by Tedy Bruschi. Bruschi then returned the ball 30 yards into Jets territory. However, the teams would exchange punts twice. New England then took the lead on a short Adam Vinatieri field goal. After the Jets punted, Brady hooked up with David Givens on a long completion, then found Daniel Graham for a touchdown just after the two minute warning. After another Jets punt, Brady hit Deion Branch on a long pass, setting up a Vinatieri field goal to lead 13–0 with just 7 seconds left in the half. Improbably, Jason Glenn then fumbled the ensuing kickoff and Tully Banta-Cain recovered for New England. However, the Patriots failed to take advantage when Vinatieri missed a 50-yard field goal to close the half.

Both teams punted to start the second half. The Patriots then engaged in a lengthy drive to another Vinatieri field goal, giving them 16–0 lead. Pennington was then intercepted by Eugene Wilson who returned the punt to the Jets 15-yard line. Through 3 quarters, the Jets had not managed more than 5 punts and 3 turnovers. The Patriots took advantage, with Brady finding Branch on a 6-yard touchdown to take a 23–0 lead. The Jets would then manage their only score of the day on a 15-yard pass from Pennington to Santana Moss. The game's final 9 minutes were played scoreless, and the Patriots clinched the #2 seed in the AFC, guaranteeing a first round bye in the Playoffs.

==== Week 17: vs. San Francisco 49ers ====
Quarter	1	2	3	4	Total
49ers	7	0	0	0	7
Patriots	0	7	7	7	21

at Gillette Stadium, Foxborough, Massachusetts

- Game time: 1:00 pm EST
- Game weather: 32 °F (0 °C), partly cloudy
- Game attendance: 68,756
- Referee: Walt Coleman
- TV announcers (Fox): Curt Menefee (play-by-play), Tim Green (color commentator), Butch Stearns (contributor)

The 2–13 49ers, having the worst season in franchise history, punted on their first possession. Corey Dillon fumbled on the ensuing Patriots possession to give the ball back to San Francisco. However, the mightily struggling 49er offense immediately committed three consecutive penalties, setting up a 1st down and 32 situation. They would eventually go three-and-out to give the ball back to New England. However, Dwaine Carpenter then intercepted Tom Brady and returned it into the Patriots red zone. This led to a Ken Dorsey touchdown pass to Steve Bush, the only points the 49ers would score all day. After a Patriots punt, the 49ers would miss a scoring chance when Todd Peterson missed a 39-yard field goal. The Patriots took advantage, with Dillon making several long runs and Brady finding David Givens inside the San Francisco 5-yard line. Brady then found linebacker Mike Vrabel, who caught his fourth career touchdown. After a 49ers punt, the Patriots drove downfield on a Brady completion to reserve tight end Jed Weaver. However, Brady was then strip-sacked by John Engelberger, with Bryant Young recovering for San Francisco. Thus, the half ended with the game tied 7–7.

The teams exchanged punts to start the second half. The Patriots then marched downfield, bolstered by a 26-yard run by Dillon that put him over the 100 yard mark for the 9th time on the season. Brady then threw a screen pass to Deion Branch, which Branch took to the end zone to put the Patriots in front at 14–7. After an exchange of punts, the 49ers entered Patriots territory on a long run by Kevan Barlow and a Dorsey pass to Curtis Conway. However, the drive ended when Maurice Hicks fumbled and Patriots linebacker Tully Banta-Cain recovered. Dillon would then score from 6 yards out to cap another great day rushing and seal a 21–7 victory. The win gave New England its second consecutive 14–2 season.

== Standings ==
AFC East
	W	L	T	PCT	DIV	CONF	PF	PA	STK
^{(2)} New England Patriots	14	2	0	.875	5–1	10–2	437	260	W2
^{(5)} New York Jets	10	6	0	.625	3–3	7–5	333	261	L2
Buffalo Bills	9	7	0	.563	3–3	5–7	395	284	L1
Miami Dolphins	4	12	0	.250	1–5	2–10	275	354	L1

AFC
#	Team	Division	W	L	T	PCT	DIV	CONF	SOS	SOV	STK
Division leaders
1	Pittsburgh Steelers	North	15	1	0	.938	5–1	11–1	.484	.479	W14
2	New England Patriots	East	14	2	0	.875	5–1	10–2	.492	.478	W2
3 (Note: Indianapolis clinched the AFC #3 seed instead of San Diego based upon head-to-head victory.)	Indianapolis Colts	South	12	4	0	.750	5–1	8–4	.500	.458	L1
4	San Diego Chargers	West	12	4	0	.750	5–1	9–3	.477	.411	W1
Wild cards
5 (Note: New York Jets clinched the AFC #5 seed instead of Denver based upon better record against common opponents (New York Jets were 5–0 to Denver’s 3–2 against San Diego, Cincinnati, Houston, and Miami).)	New York Jets	East	10	6	0	.625	3–3	7–5	.523	.406	L2
6	Denver Broncos	West	10	6	0	.625	3–3	7–5	.484	.450	W2
Did not qualify for the postseason
7 (Note: Jacksonville and Baltimore finished ahead of Buffalo because they each defeated Buffalo head-to-head.) (Note: Jacksonville finished ahead of Baltimore based upon better record against common opponents (Jacksonville were 3–2 against Baltimore’s 2–3 versus Pittsburgh, Indianapolis, Buffalo and Kansas City).)	Jacksonville Jaguars	South	9	7	0	.563	2–4	6–6	.527	.479	W1
8	Baltimore Ravens	North	9	7	0	.563	3–3	6–6	.551	.472	W1
9	Buffalo Bills	East	9	7	0	.563	3–3	5–7	.512	.382	L1
10	Cincinnati Bengals	North	8	8	0	.500	2–4	4–8	.543	.453	W2
11 (Note: Houston finished ahead of Kansas City based upon head-to-head victory.)	Houston Texans	South	7	9	0	.438	4–2	6–6	.504	.402	L1
12	Kansas City Chiefs	West	7	9	0	.438	3–3	6–6	.551	.509	L1
13 (Note: Oakland finished ahead of Tennessee based upon head-to-head victory.)	Oakland Raiders	West	5	11	0	.313	1–5	3–9	.570	.450	L2
14	Tennessee Titans	South	5	11	0	.313	1–5	3–9	.512	.463	W1
15 (Note: Miami finished ahead of Cleveland based upon head-to-head victory.)	Miami Dolphins	East	4	12	0	.250	1–5	2–10	.555	.438	L1
16	Cleveland Browns	North	4	12	0	.250	1–5	3–9	.590	.469	W1
Tiebreakers (Note: When breaking ties for three or more teams under the NFL's rules, they are first broken within divisions, then comparing only the highest-ranked remaining team from each division.)

=== Standings breakdown ===
	W	L	T	Pct	PF	PA
Home	8	0	0	1.000	203	105
Away	6	2	0	.750	234	155
AFC East Opponents	5	1	0	.833	148	76
AFC Opponents	10	2	0	.833	323	199
NFC Opponents	4	0	0	1.000	114	61
By Stadium Type
Indoors	1	0	0	1.000	40	22
Outdoors	13	2	0	.867	397	238

== Postseason ==
=== Results ===
==== Divisional Round vs. Indianapolis Colts ====
Quarter	1	2	3	4	Total
Colts	0	3	0	0	3
Patriots	0	6	7	7	20

at Gillette Stadium, Foxborough, Massachusetts

- Game time: 4:30 pm EST
- Game weather: 25 °F (−4 °C), cloudy, snow
- Game attendance: 68,756
- Referee: Bill Carollo
- TV announcers (CBS): Jim Nantz (play-by-play), Phil Simms (color commentator), and Bonnie Bernstein (sideline reporter)

The Colts entered the game with the league's top offense, with Peyton Manning having thrown for 49 touchdowns during the regular season and the Colts having scored 49 points against Denver in their first playoff game. Meanwhile, the Patriots came into the game after having a first round bye. Just as in the previous year's postseason meeting between the Patriots and Colts, the game was played in a New England snowstorm.

Both teams defenses dominated early, as the first five possessions of the game ended in punts. But after that, the Patriots put together a 16-play, 78 yards scoring drive that took 9:07 off the clock. They lost a touchdown when Corey Dillon's 1-yard score was overturned by a penalty, but Adam Vinatieri kicked a 24-yard field goal to give them a 3–0 lead. The next time New England got the ball, a 42-yard run by Dillon set up another Vinatieri field goal, increasing the Patriots lead to 6–0. The Colts responded with a drive to New England's 39-yard line, but linebacker Tedy Bruschi ended it by ripping the ball out of the hands of running back Dominic Rhodes and gaining possession himself. After a Patriots punt, Manning led the Colts 67 yards, but was nearly intercepted in the end zone by Asante Samuel. Samuel dropped the interception, allowing Mike Vanderjagt to kick a field goal, cutting the score to 6–3 going into halftime.

But the Patriots dominated the second half, holding the ball for nearly all the time in regulation with two long drives. After an exchange of punts, they drove 87 yards in 15 plays on a drive that consumed 8:16 and ended with Brady's 5-yard touchdown pass to David Givens. At the end of the Colts next drive, Hunter Smith's 54-yard punt pinned New England back at their own 6-yard line. Sparked by a third down catch by Kevin Faulk to start the drive, the Patriots slowly marched down the field on a 14-play, 94-yard drive that ate up another 7:24. Dillon rushed for 35 yards and caught a pass for 9 on the drive, including a 27-yard run on third down and 8, while Brady finished it with a 1-yard quarterback sneak, giving the Patriots a 20–3 lead with just over 7 minutes left in the game. Then two plays after the ensuing kickoff, safety Rodney Harrison stripped the ball from Reggie Wayne and Bruschi recovered it, allowing his team to take more time off the clock. Indianapolis responded with a drive to the Patriots 20-yard line, but Harrison intercepted Manning's pass in the end zone with 10 seconds left, as overjoyed fans taunted Manning with a sustained chant of "Cut that meat!" in reference to a MasterCard commercial their now-defeated rival had filmed.

The Patriots dismantled the league's highest scoring team by forcing three turnovers and holding them to just 276 yards and 3 points, their lowest point total since their opening game of the 2003 season. Peyton Manning suffered his seventh loss in Foxborough, even though he had more yards passing than Brady did in the game. Manning had thrown for a record 49 touchdowns during the regular season, but the Colts did not find the end zone in the game. Just like the previous year, the snow appeared to help the New England defense blight Manning, as the Patriots limited the Colts quarterback to 238 passing yards with 1 interception and no touchdowns, and Edgerrin James to just 39 rushing yards. The Patriots also held possession of the ball for 37:43, including 21:26 in the second half and recording three long scoring drives that each took over 7 minutes off the clock. Dillon, playing in his first career playoff game after suffering through 7 losing seasons as a member of the Cincinnati Bengals, rushed for 144 yards and caught 5 passes for 17 yards.

- Scoring
  - NE – field goal Vinatieri 24 NE 3–0
  - NE – field goal Vinatieri 31 NE 6–0
  - IND – field goal Vanderjagt 23 NE 6–3
  - NE – Givens 5 pass from Brady (Vinatieri kick) NE 13–3
  - NE – Brady 1 run (Vinatieri kick) NE 20–3

==== AFC Championship at Pittsburgh Steelers ====
Quarter	1	2	3	4	Total
Patriots	10	14	7	10	41
Steelers	3	0	14	10	27

at Heinz Field, Pittsburgh, Pennsylvania

- Game time: 6:30 pm EST
- Game weather: 11 °F (−12 °C), fair
- Game attendance: 65,242
- Referee: Walt Anderson
- TV announcers (CBS): Jim Nantz (play-by-play), Phil Simms (color commentator), Bonnie Bernstein and Armen Keteyian (sideline reporters)

The game-time temperature of 11 °F (−12 °C) made it the second-coldest game ever in Pittsburgh and the coldest ever in Steel City playoff annals. However, it was the Patriots that handed Ben Roethlisberger his first loss as a starter after a 14-game winning streak, the longest by a rookie quarterback in NFL history, as the Steelers became the second NFL team ever to record a 15–1 record and fail to reach the Super Bowl. The Patriots converted four Pittsburgh turnovers into 24 points, while committing no turnovers themselves. The Patriots' win also prevented an all-Pennsylvania Super Bowl from being played, as well as the first to feature a team led by a rookie starting quarterback.

The Steelers never recovered from their poor performance in the first quarter. Patriots defensive back Eugene Wilson intercepted Roethlisberger's first pass of the game on his own 48-yard line, setting up Adam Vinatieri's 48-yard field goal to take a 3–0 lead. Pittsburgh responded with a drive to the Patriots 39-yard line. But then running back Jerome Bettis lost a fumble while being tackled by Rosevelt Colvin and linebacker Mike Vrabel recovered it. On the next play, Tom Brady threw a 60-yard touchdown pass to receiver Deion Branch.

With 1:28 left in the first quarter, the Steelers cut their deficit to 10–3 with Jeff Reed's 23-yard field goal. But after an exchange of punts, Branch caught a 45-yard reception on Pittsburgh's 14-yard line. Two plays later, Brady threw a 9-yard touchdown pass to David Givens. Then on the Steelers ensuing drive, safety Rodney Harrison intercepted a pass from Roethlisberger and returned it 87 yards for a touchdown, giving the Patriots a 24–3 halftime lead.

New England was forced to punt on the opening drive of the third quarter, and Antwaan Randle El returned the ball 9 yards to the Steelers 44-yard line. Then on the Steelers ensuing possession, he caught two passes for 46 yards as they drove 56 yards in five plays. Bettis finished the drive with a 5-yard touchdown run, cutting their deficit to 24–10. It looked like New England would have to punt again, as a Clark Haggans sack of Brady left the Patriots with 3rd and 17 in their own territory. Brady's 3rd down throw fell incomplete, but Aaron Smith was called for holding Kevin Faulk, giving the Patriots a first down. Brady then found Givens inside the Steeler 40-yard line, however he initially was ruled to have fumbled and Pittsburgh to have possession. Bill Belichick successfully challenged the call, and a Steelers personal foul moved the ball to the Pittsburgh 25-yard line. Corey Dillon then scored on a 25-yard touchdown run, making the score 31–10. Pittsburgh tried to come back, driving 60 yards in ten plays and scoring with Roethlisberger's 30-yard touchdown pass to Hines Ward on a 4th down and 5. Then after forcing a punt, Randle El returned the ball 22 yards to the Steelers 49-yard line. On their ensuing drive, Ward's 26-yard reception on the last play of the third quarter set up Reed's second field goal, making the score 31–20 with 13:32 left in the game.

However, the Patriots took over the rest of the quarter. They responded with a 49-yard drive that took 5:26 off the clock and ended with Vinatieri's 31-yard field goal. Then two plays after the ensuing kickoff, Wilson intercepted another pass from Roethlisberger at New England's 45-yard line. The Patriots subsequently marched down the field on another long scoring drive, taking 5:06 off the clock. Branch capped it off with a 23-yard touchdown run on a reverse play, giving the Patriots a 41–20 lead. The Steelers responded with Roethlisberger's 7-yard touchdown pass to Plaxico Burress on their next drive, but by then there was only 52 seconds left in the game.

Brady completed 14 of 21 passes for 207 yards and 2 touchdowns. Dillon rushed for 73 yards and a touchdown. Branch caught 4 passes for 116 yards, rushed for 37 yards, and scored two touchdowns. Roethlisberger threw for 226 yards and 2 touchdowns, and rushed for 45 yards, but was intercepted 3 times. Ward caught 5 passes for 109 yards and a touchdown.

- Scoring
  - NE – field goal Vinatieri 48 yards NE 3–0
  - NE – Branch 60-yard pass from Brady (Vinatieri kick) NE 10–0
  - PIT – field goal Reed 43 yards NE 10–3
  - NE – Givens 9-yard pass from Brady (Vinatieri kick) NE 17–3
  - NE – Harrison 87-yard interception return (Vinatieri kick) NE 24–3
  - PIT – Bettis 5-yard run (Reed kick) NE 24–10
  - NE – Dillon 25-yard run (Vinatieri kick) NE 31–10
  - PIT – Ward 30-yard pass from Roethlisberger (Reed kick) NE 31–17
  - PIT – field goal Reed 20 yards NE 31–20
  - NE – field goal Vinatieri 31 yards NE 34–20
  - NE – Branch 23-yard run (Vinatieri kick) NE 41–20
  - PIT – Burress 7-yard pass from Roethlisberger (Reed kick) NE 41–27

==== Super Bowl XXXIX at Philadelphia Eagles ====
Quarter	1	2	3	4	Total
Patriots	0	7	7	10	24
Eagles	0	7	7	7	21

at Alltel Stadium, Jacksonville, Florida

- Game time: 6:30 pm EST
- Game weather: 59 °F (15 °C), clear
- Game attendance: 78,125
- Referee: Terry McAulay
- TV announcers (Fox): Joe Buck (play-by-play), Troy Aikman and Cris Collinsworth (color commentators), Pam Oliver and Chris Myers (sideline reporters)

On the first drive of the game, Eagles quarterback Donovan McNabb fumbled while being sacked by New England linebacker Willie McGinest, and the Patriots recovered the ball at Philadelphia's 34-yard line. Fortunately for the Eagles, coach Andy Reid's instant replay challenge overruled the fumble; officials ruled that McNabb had been down by contact before the ball came out of his hands. Later in the quarter after each team had punted twice, McNabb completed a 30-yard pass to Terrell Owens, with a roughing the passer penalty adding 9 yards, moving the ball inside the Patriots 20-yard line. However, linebacker Mike Vrabel sacked McNabb for a 16-yard loss on the next play. On the following play, the Eagles once again appeared to turn the ball over: McNabb's pass was intercepted in the end zone by Patriots defensive back Asante Samuel, but it was nullified by an illegal contact penalty on linebacker Roman Phifer, moving the ball back inside the 20 and giving the Eagles a first down. However, McNabb's second chance was wasted as he threw an interception to safety Rodney Harrison on the next play.

The Eagles defense then forced New England to a three-and-out on their ensuing possession, and Philadelphia got great field position by receiving the punt at the Patriots 45-yard line. But once again, they gave up another turnover: tight end L.J. Smith lost a fumble while being tackled by defensive back Randall Gay, and Samuel recovered the ball at the 38.

The Eagles defense once again forced New England to punt, and got the ball back at their own 19-yard line. Aided by a pair of completions from McNabb to receiver Todd Pinkston for gains of 17 and 40 yards, the Eagles drove 81 yards in 9 plays and scored on McNabb's 6-yard touchdown pass to Smith, taking a 7–0 lead with 9:55 left in the second quarter. It was the first time New England trailed during the entire postseason. On their ensuing drive, the Patriots moved the ball to the Eagles 4-yard line, mainly on plays by Corey Dillon, who caught two screen passes for 29 yards and rushed for 25. But quarterback Tom Brady fumbled the ball on a fake handoff and Philadelphia defender Darwin Walker recovered it. However, the Eagles could not take advantage of the turnover and had to punt after 3 plays. Eagles punter Dirk Johnson's punt went just 29 yards, giving the Patriots the ball at Philadelphia's 37-yard line. The Patriots then drove 37 yards to score on Brady's 4-yard pass to receiver David Givens with 1:10 remaining in the period, tying the game 7–7 by halftime. It was only the second halftime tie in Super Bowl history and the first time both of the game's first 2 quarters ended tied.

On the opening drive of the second half, Patriots receiver Deion Branch caught 4 passes for 71 yards on a drive that ended with Brady's 2-yard pass to Vrabel, who lined up at the tight end spot on the play. The Eagles later tied the game with 3:39 left in the third period with a 74-yard, 10-play drive that was capped by McNabb's 10-yard touchdown pass to running back Brian Westbrook. For the first time in Super Bowl history, the game was tied going into the fourth quarter.

Early in the final period, the Patriots put together a 9-play, 66-yard scoring drive that was keyed by 3 plays from running back Kevin Faulk, who caught 2 passes for 27 combined yards and rushed once for 12. Dillon capped off the drive with a 2-yard touchdown run to give the Patriots a 21–14 lead. Then after forcing another Eagles punt, Branch's 19-yard reception and a roughing-the-passer penalty on Philadelphia defensive lineman Corey Simon set up kicker Adam Vinatieri's 22-yard field goal with 8:43 left in the game to increase the score 24–14.

The Eagles responded by advancing to the New England 36-yard line on their next drive, but it ended with no points after linebacker Tedy Bruschi intercepted a pass from McNabb at the Patriots 24-yard line. After forcing New England to punt, Philadelphia got the ball back at their own 21-yard line with 5:40 left in the game.

The Eagles then drove 79 yards in 13 plays to cut their deficit to 24–21 with McNabb's 30-yard touchdown pass to receiver Greg Lewis. However, the drive consumed 3:52 of the clock, and only 1:55 remained in the game by the time Lewis scored. Because of this, many sportswriters later criticized the Eagles for not immediately going to a no-huddle offense at the start of the possession. (Two days after the game, some Eagles players revealed that McNabb was so sick that he had trouble calling the plays.)

The Eagles failed to recover their ensuing onside kick attempt. The Patriots then played it safe by running the ball 3 times and forcing Philadelphia to use all of its timeouts. New England punter Josh Miller then pinned the Eagles back at their own 4-yard line with just 46 seconds left in the game. Philadelphia then tried one last desperate drive to win or tie the game. But on first down, McNabb was pressured into making a rushed pass to Westbrook at the line of scrimmage. Instead of dropping the pass to stop the clock, Westbrook made the mistake of catching the ball and was immediately tackled for no gain, keeping the clock running and forcing the Eagles to run back to the line of scrimmage for their next play with no huddle. On second down, McNabb threw an incomplete pass intended for Owens. Finally on third down, McNabb threw a pass that went just over the outstretched fingertips of Smith and into the arms of Harrison for an interception with 9 seconds left, sealing the victory for the Patriots. With the win, the Patriots secured their 3rd ever Super Bowl and won in back-to-back years. However, this would be both the Patriots last Super Bowl win until 2014 and the last time any team would win two consecutive Super Bowls until the Kansas City Chiefs in 2022 & 2023.

- Scoring
  - PHI – TD: L.J. Smith 6-yard pass from Donovan McNabb (David Akers kick) 7–0 PHI
  - NE – TD: David Givens 4-yard pass from Tom Brady (Adam Vinatieri kick) 7–7 tie
  - NE – TD: Mike Vrabel 2-yard pass from Tom Brady (Adam Vinatieri kick) 14–7 NE
  - PHI – TD: Brian Westbrook 10-yard pass from Donovan McNabb (David Akers kick) 14–14 tie
  - NE – TD: Corey Dillon 2-yard run (Adam Vinatieri kick) 21–14 NE
  - NE – FG: Adam Vinatieri 22 yards 24–14 NE
  - PHI – TD: Greg Lewis 30-yard pass from Donovan McNabb (David Akers kick) 24–21 NE

== Awards and honors ==
Recipient	Award(s)
Tom Brady	2004 Sporting News Sportsman of the Year
Deion Branch	Super Bowl XXXIX MVP
Troy Brown	2004 New England Patriots 12th Player Award
Rosevelt Colvin	2004 New England Patriots Ed Block Courage Award
Corey Dillon	December: AFC Offensive Player of the Month
Ty Warren	2004 New England Patriots Ron Burton Community Service Award
Adam Vinatieri	November: AFC Special Teams Player of the Month; Week 9: AFC Special Teams Player of the Week; AFC Championship: NFL Special Teams Player of the Week

=== Pro Bowl selections ===
Patriots kicker Adam Vinatieri and special teamer Larry Izzo were both named as starters to the 2005 Pro Bowl. Quarterback Tom Brady and defensive end Richard Seymour were elected as reserves; Seymour did not play in the game due to injury. Additionally, running back Corey Dillon and linebacker Tedy Bruschi were named as injury replacements, however, Dillon did not participate in the game due to injury.
