= Randall Gay =

American football player (born 1982)

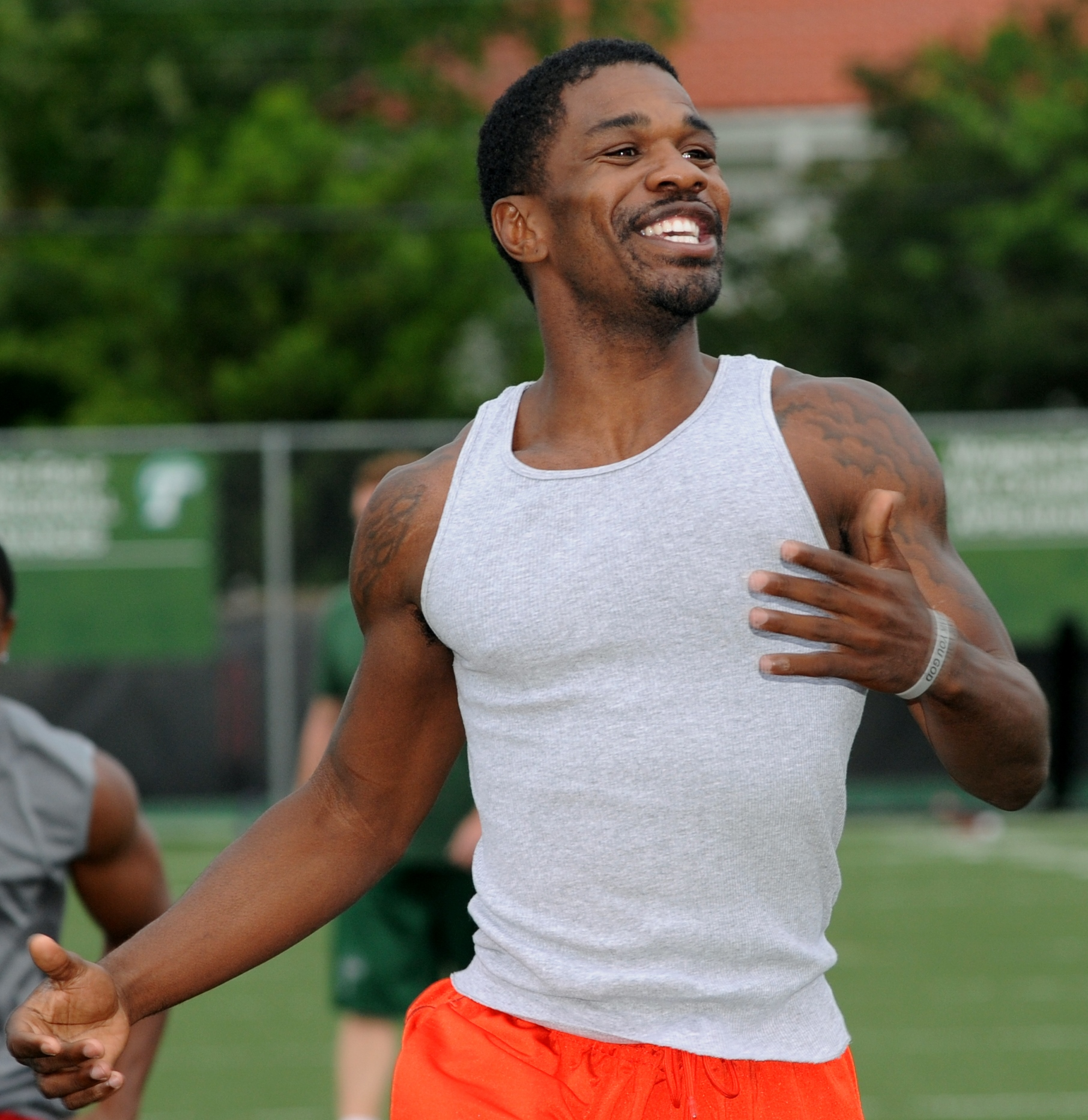
- Gay practices with the New Orleans Saints in 2011

No. 21, 20
- Position: Cornerback

Personal information
- Born: May 5, 1982 (age 44); Baton Rouge, Louisiana, U.S.
- Listed height: 5 ft 11 in (1.80 m)
- Listed weight: 190 lb (86 kg)

Career information
- High school: Brusly (Brusly, Louisiana)
- College: LSU
- NFL draft: 2004: undrafted

Career history
- New England Patriots (2004–2007); New Orleans Saints (2008–2010)

Awards and highlights
- 2× Super Bowl champion (XXXIX, XLIV); BCS national champion (2003)

Career NFL statistics
- Total tackles: 180
- Sacks: 2.0
- Forced fumbles: 1
- Fumble recoveries: 3
- Interceptions: 6
- Defensive touchdowns: 2
- Stats at Pro Football Reference

Randall Jerome Gay Jr. (born May 5, 1982) is an American former professional football player who was a cornerback in the National Football League (NFL). He played college football for the LSU Tigers. He was signed by the New England Patriots as an undrafted free agent in 2004.

Gay also played for the New Orleans Saints. He played on a Super Bowl winning team with both the Patriots and the Saints, and is also noted for being one of the two Louisianan-born (other being former LSU and Saints teammate, Devery Henderson) having won a championship at both the college and pro level for teams of Louisiana, his home state.

== Early life ==
At Brusly High School in Brusly, Louisiana, Randall Gay was a four-year letterman in football. He also lettered in weight lifting (three years) and track (one year). He was a first-team All-Metro selection, and a first-team All-District selection in football during his last two years of high school. As a senior, in only eight games, he rushed for 1,067 yards and 13 touchdowns, caught three touchdown passes, and returned two punts for touchdowns.

== College career ==
He played college football at Louisiana State University. He won a BCS National Championship with the Tigers in 2003 as a nickel back.

== Professional career ==
=== New England Patriots ===
On April 29, 2004, he was signed by the Patriots shortly after the NFL draft as an undrafted free agent. His rookie year, Gay beat out cornerback Christian Morton, the Patriots' 7th-round draft pick, for a place on the roster. Later in the season, Gay was placed into the starting lineup because of injuries to veterans Ty Law and Tyrone Poole. Gay's rookie season concluded with a victory in Super Bowl XXXIX, in which he started opposite Asante Samuel where he was the leading tackler with 11 solo tackles. Gay was involved in several low level controversies as a Patriot: He failed to make a full contribution in 2005 and 2006, due to injuries that landed him on injured reserve. This led to some long running criticisms from the tough vocal New England fans and repeated questions about him on the region's talk shows and in the papers. Hence, after failing to deliver up to expectations of New England Patriots fans in both the 2005 and 2006 seasons, before the 2007 training camp, Gay was quoted as saying:

You know how it is, It's like, 'Oh man, you're still getting a paycheck?' and 'Two years in a row!?!' That's the kind of stuff you really don't want to hear, because in your heart you want to be back out there. I can say this, I'm the most anxious person for training camp. I'm about the only one here that's ready for it to come.

Gay returned in 2007 and played primarily as a nickel back and a backup safety. He did start several games, including the AFC Divisional Game against the Jacksonville Jaguars. Gay intercepted a career-high three passes while playing in every game of the 2007 season en route to a perfect regular season that ended with the Patriots' defeat at the hands of the New York Giants in Super Bowl XLII.

=== New Orleans Saints ===
On March 2, 2008, Gay signed a four-year, $17.8 million contract with the New Orleans Saints. The deal included a $3.75 million signing bonus and $6.9 million in guaranteed money. He was a member of the Saints' 2009 Super Bowl XLIV Championship team. Gay suffered a concussion early in the 2010 season that eventually led to him being placed on injured reserve on October 20, 2010.

Gay was released by New Orleans on July 28, 2011, and retired thereafter. In 2012, he was a named plaintiff in one of the lawsuits filed by former players against the NFL regarding the league's history of players suffering concussions.

== NFL career statistics ==
Legend
**Bold**	Career high

=== Regular season ===
Year	Team	Games		Tackles					Interceptions					Fumbles			
Year	Team	GP	GS	Cmb	Solo	Ast	Sck	TFL	Int	Yds	TD	Lng	PD	FF	FR	Yds	TD
2004	NWE	15	9	34	29	**5**	0.0	1	2	23	0	13	6	0	**2**	**41**	**1**
2005	NWE	5	2	12	10	2	0.0	0	0	0	0	0	1	0	0	0	0
2006	NWE	3	0	2	2	0	0.0	0	0	0	0	0	0	0	0	0	0
2007	NWE	**16**	3	37	32	**5**	0.0	1	**3**	**52**	0	**31**	7	**1**	1	15	**1**
2008	NOR	14	**13**	**53**	**49**	4	**1.0**	**3**	0	0	0	0	**15**	0	0	0	0
2009	NOR	14	7	37	32	**5**	**1.0**	2	1	25	0	25	5	0	0	0	0
2010	NOR	4	0	5	3	2	0.0	0	0	0	0	0	0	0	0	0	0
		71	34	180	157	23	2.0	7	6	100	0	31	34	1	3	56	2

=== Playoffs ===
Year	Team	Games		Tackles					Interceptions					Fumbles			
Year	Team	GP	GS	Cmb	Solo	Ast	Sck	TFL	Int	Yds	TD	Lng	PD	FF	FR	Yds	TD
2004	NWE	**3**	**3**	7	5	**2**	0.0	0	0	0	0	0	0	0	0	0	0
2007	NWE	**3**	1	8	7	1	0.0	0	0	0	0	0	**2**	1	0	0	0
2009	NOR	**3**	1	**17**	**17**	0	0.0	0	0	0	0	0	0	**2**	0	0	0
		9	5	32	29	3	0.0	0	0	0	0	0	2	3	0	0	0

== Personal life ==
- Gay majored in marketing at LSU.
- Gay played both cornerback and safety, as he did against the Indianapolis Colts in 2005.
- After Super Bowl XXXIX, one of Gay's college professors attempted to order a replica jersey of her former student. The NFL Shop denied her request because the word "Gay" was on a blacklist of words considered related to drugs, sex, or gangs. After the incident was reported in the press, "Gay" was removed from the banned name list because it is the actual name of an NFL player.
- Randall and his wife, Desha, have two sons. After Gay's retirement, he and Desha decided to go to law school together. In 2015, they both graduated from Southern University Law Center in Baton Rouge.
