= Earthwind Moreland =

American football player (born 1977)

No. 38, 29
- Position: Cornerback

Personal information
- Born: June 13, 1977 (age 49); Atlanta, Georgia, U.S.
- Listed height: 5 ft 11 in (1.80 m)
- Listed weight: 186 lb (84 kg)

Career information
- High school: Henry Grady (GA)
- College: Georgia Southern
- NFL draft: 2000: undrafted

Career history
- Tampa Bay Buccaneers (2000)*; New York Jets (2000); New Orleans Saints (2001)*; Jacksonville Jaguars (2001); Cleveland Browns (2001–2002); → Rhein Fire (2002); Rhein Fire (2004); New England Patriots (2004)*; Minnesota Vikings (2004)*; New England Patriots (2004); Houston Texans (2006)*; Georgia Force (2006); Las Vegas Gladiators (2007); Team Alabama (2008)*
- * Offseason or practice squad member only

Awards and highlights
- Super Bowl champion (XXXIX)
- Stats at Pro Football Reference

Earthwind Chatavian Moreland (born June 13, 1977) is an American former professional football player who was a cornerback in the National Football League (NFL), Arena Football League (AFL), and NFL Europe.

== Early life ==
Moreland attended Grady High School in Atlanta and was a letterman in football, basketball, and baseball. In football, he garnered All-City honors.

== College career ==
Moreland attended Georgia Southern University and was a letterman in football. He joined the team as a walk-on and initially played the wide receiver position before he was converted to a defensive back. Moreland was named an All-Southern Conference selection as a junior and senior, and also garnered third-team All-America honors from the Sporting News during his senior year. Over the course of his college career, he played in 52 games with 42 starts as Georgia Southern won three consecutive Southern Conference titles and finished with the NCAA Division I-AA championship.

== Professional career ==
Moreland was initially signed as an undrafted free agent by the Tampa Bay Buccaneers in 2000. He was waived and claimed off waivers by the New York Jets in the same off-season, and a year later was traded, along with a sixth-round pick in 2002, to the New Orleans Saints for running back Chad Morton in August 2001. Moreland was waived by the Saints just over a week later and claimed off waivers by the Jacksonville Jaguars the following day. He spent about one month with the team before an ultimate release from their practice squad, landing with the Cleveland Browns in the same capacity, and was mostly inactive. Allocated by the Cleveland Browns to the Rhein Fire of NFL Europe in 2002, where Moreland earned All-League honors as the Fire went on to lose in World Bowl X. Moreland remained with the team when he returned, then landed on injured reserve with a groin injury.

After being signed and released within a month from August to September 2004 by the New England Patriots, he had a brief stint on the Minnesota Vikings practice squad and was again signed by the Patriots. He was promoted from the practice squad and found some playing time with the Patriots in 2004 due to injuries to the Patriots' secondary (including starters Ty Law and Tyrone Poole), making two starts in nine games. By the end of the season and during the playoffs, Moreland was the fourth cornerback on the depth chart, behind Asante Samuel, Randall Gay, and wide receiver Troy Brown. Moreland was released after the season. He spent about 3 weeks over August 2006 attempting to make the cut with the Houston Texans, but did not make the team. He recorded 17 career tackles (15 solo) in the NFL.

In 2008, Moreland joined the upstart All-American Football League after being drafted by Team Alabama. However, neither the team nor the league as a whole ever played even a single game.

== Personal life ==
Moreland was named after his mother's favorite band, Earth, Wind & Fire. He has spent time as the head football coach at Mundy's Mill High School in Jonesboro, Georgia.
