= Patrick Pass =

American football player and coach (born 1977)

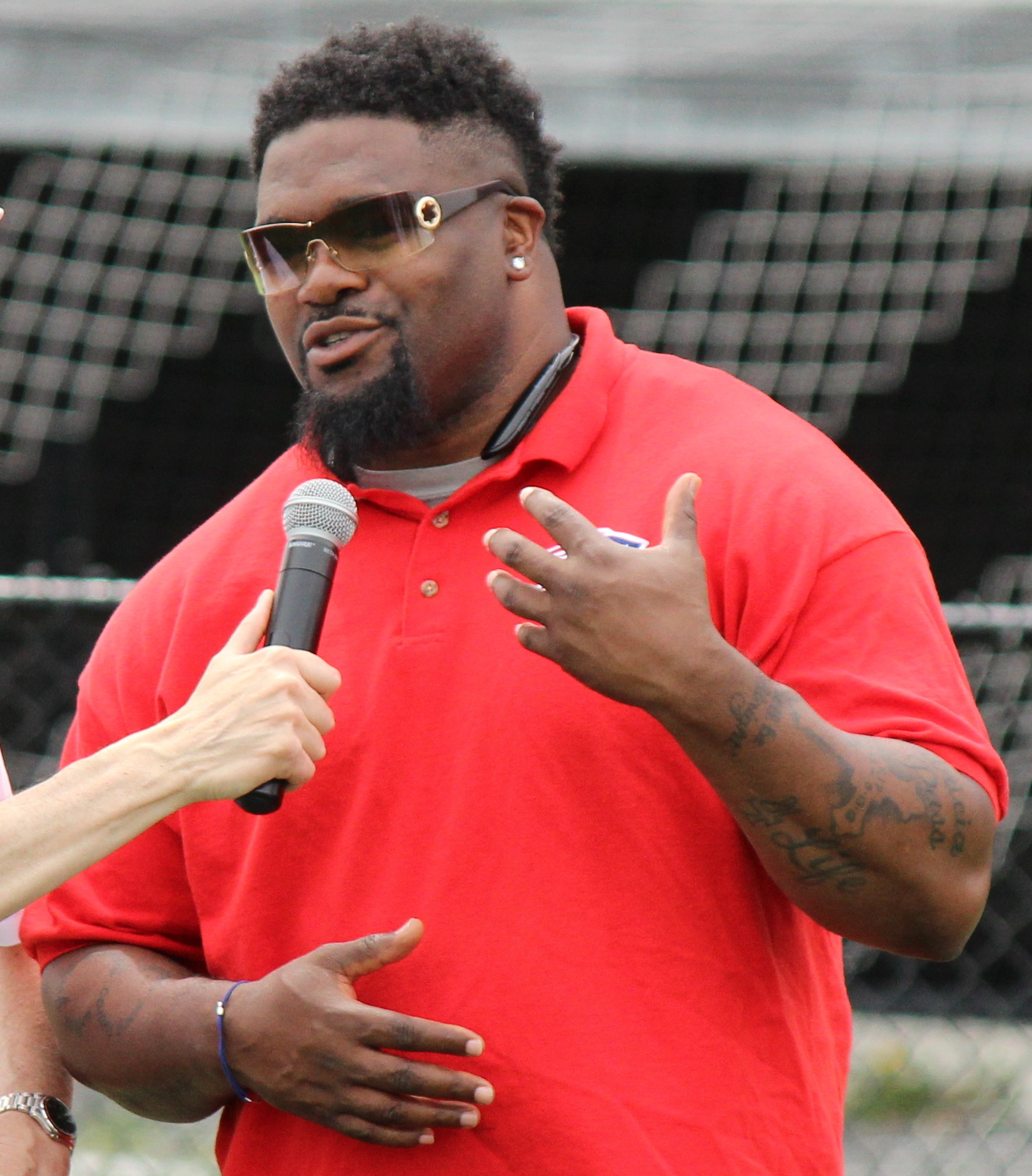
- Pass in 2016

Massachusetts Pirates
- Title: Director of football personnel development

Personal information
- Born: December 31, 1977 (age 48); Atlanta, Georgia, U.S.
- Listed height: 5 ft 10 in (1.78 m)
- Listed weight: 217 lb (98 kg)

Career information
- High school: Tucker (Tucker, Georgia)
- College: Georgia
- NFL draft: 2000: 7th round, 239th overall pick

Career history

Playing
- New England Patriots (2000–2006); Houston Texans (2007)*; New York Giants (2007); New England Patriots (2009)*
- * Offseason or practice squad member only

Coaching
- Massachusetts Pirates (2020–2021) Head coach

Operations
- Massachusetts Pirates (2022-present) Director of football personnel development

Awards and highlights
- 3× Super Bowl champion (XXXVI, XXXVIII, XXXIX); United Bowl champion (2021)

Career NFL statistics
- Games played: 79
- Rushing attempts: 128
- Rushing yards: 526
- Receptions: 66
- Receiving yards: 570
- Total touchdowns: 4
- Stats at Pro Football Reference

Patrick DeAndrea Pass (born December 31, 1977) is an American football coach and former fullback, who was the director of football personnel development for the Massachusetts Pirates of the Indoor Football League (IFL) until he was suspended from the IFL indefinitely. He was drafted by the New England Patriots in the seventh round of the 2000 NFL draft. He played college football at Georgia. He was also a member of the New York Giants and the Houston Texans.

== Early life ==
Pass attended Tucker High School in Tucker, Georgia, and lettered in football and baseball. In football, he was a three-year starter at running back, and as a senior, he was also named as an All-USA selection by USA Today. In 2026, Pass was inducted into the Georgia High School Football Hall of Fame.

== College career ==
Pass attended the University of Georgia, where he played football as a running back, quarterback, receiver, and kick returner. Before his freshman season, he was drafted by the Florida Marlins in the 1996 Major League Baseball draft, and played that summer in the Marlins' farm system. He played again in the Marlins' minor league system before his sophomore and junior seasons in 1997 and 1998.

== Professional career ==
Pass was drafted 239th overall by the Patriots as a running back in the seventh round of the 2000 NFL draft. He spent two weeks on the Patriots' practice squad in 2000 before being activated. In his first start on November 19, Pass played as a running back, wide receiver, and special teamer, recording 39 rushing yards, 16 receiving yards, and two special teams tackles. In the 2002 off-season, Pass put on 35 pounds and made the transition to fullback, where he would start for the 2004 team. In 2005, with top rusher Corey Dillon injured, Pass would see time as a running back, recording a career-high 245 rushing yards that season. However, Pass himself would miss time in 2005 with a hamstring injury suffered against the Buffalo Bills on October 31. In 2006, Pass continued to struggle with the injury, being placed on the Physically Unable to Perform list, and being limited to just three games before going on injured reserve. Pass also saw time as a kick returner in his time with the Patriots, returning 36 kickoffs for 745 yards.

Pass signed with the Houston Texans before the start of the 2007 NFL season; the Texans released him on August 29, 2007. Pass was signed by the New York Giants on November 20, 2007, playing in one game before being released on November 27, 2007.

After spending the 2008 NFL season out of football, Pass signed again with the Patriots on June 4, 2009. He was released a week later, on June 11 and retired from the NFL.

== NFL career statistics ==
Legend
**Bold**	Career high

=== Regular season ===
Year	Team	Games		Rushing					Receiving				
Year	Team	GP	GS	Att	Yds	Avg	Lng	TD	Rec	Yds	Avg	Lng	TD
2000	NWE	5	2	18	58	3.2	11	0	4	17	4.3	15	0
2001	NWE	**16**	0	1	7	**7.0**	7	0	6	66	11.0	23	**1**
2002	NWE	15	0	4	27	6.8	13	0	0	0	0.0	0	0
2003	NWE	13	1	6	27	4.5	11	0	4	21	5.3	11	0
2004	NWE	14	**4**	39	141	3.6	19	0	**28**	215	7.7	22	0
2005	NWE	12	**4**	**54**	**245**	4.5	**31**	**3**	22	**227**	10.3	**39**	0
2006	NWE	3	0	6	21	3.5	6	0	2	24	**12.0**	16	0
2007	NYG	1	0	0	0	0.0	0	0	0	0	0.0	0	0
Career		79	11	128	526	4.1	31	3	66	570	8.6	39	1

=== Playoffs ===
Year	Team	Games		Rushing					Receiving				
Year	Team	GP	GS	Att	Yds	Avg	Lng	TD	Rec	Yds	Avg	Lng	TD
2001	NWE	**3**	0	0	0	0.0	0	0	0	0	0.0	0	0
2003	NWE	**3**	0	0	0	0.0	0	0	0	0	0.0	0	0
2004	NWE	**3**	**1**	**1**	0	0.0	0	0	**1**	**14**	**14.0**	**14**	0
2005	NWE	1	0	**1**	**6**	**6.0**	**6**	0	0	0	0.0	0	0
Career		10	1	2	6	3.0	6	0	1	14	14.0	14	0

== Coaching career ==
In 2012, Pass became the head coach of the Boston Freedom Fighters, a team in the new Professional Developmental Spring League called the "National Spring Football League".

In 2020, Pass was hired as the head coach for the Massachusetts Pirates, at the time a member of the National Arena League. Though the 2020 season was cancelled because of the COVID-19 pandemic, Pass would be hired again as the Pirates' head coach for 2021, their first season in the Indoor Football League (IFL). Pass would lead the Pirates to an 11–3 regular season record and a 37–34 victory over the Arizona Rattlers in the 2021 United Bowl, the Pirates' first championship in franchise history. In 2022, Pass transitioned to become the director of football personnel development for the Pirates.

In 2023, Pass was suspended indefinitely from the IFL for entering the stands and assaulting fans.

== Personal life ==
Pass married Monique Cipolla in Las Vegas in December 2008. They have two daughters, Eva and Gisele. They reside in North Providence, Rhode Island.

In August 2024, Pass was arrested for assault after shoving an elder man to the ground after an argument over gym equipment at a Rhode Island Planet Fitness. Pass agreed to enter a court diversion program to complete community service.
