= Tully Banta-Cain =

American football player (born 1980)

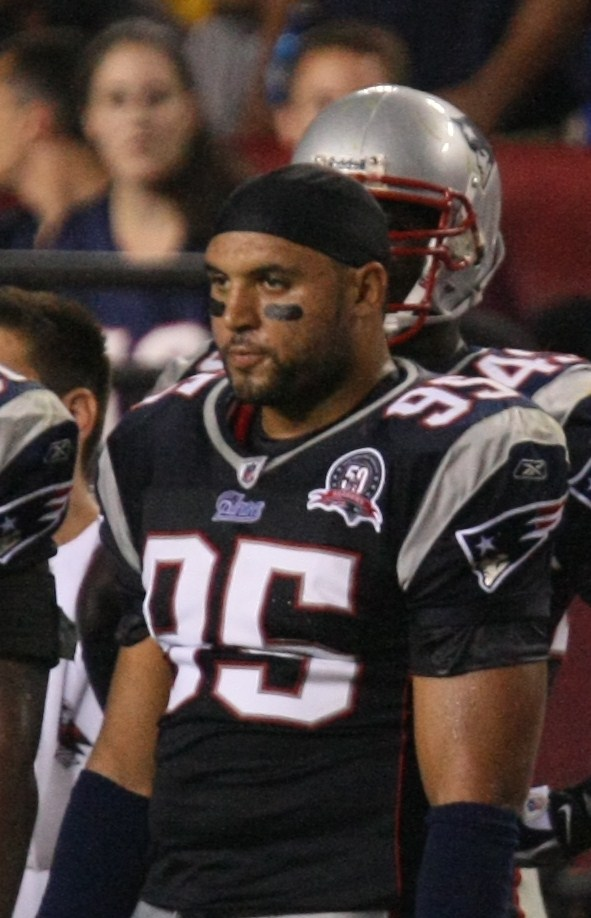
- Banta-Cain with the New England Patriots in 2009

No. 48, 95
- Position: Linebacker

Personal information
- Born: August 28, 1980 (age 46); Mountain View, California, U.S.
- Listed height: 6 ft 2 in (1.88 m)
- Listed weight: 250 lb (113 kg)

Career information
- High school: Fremont (Sunnyvale, California)
- College: California (1998–2002)
- NFL draft: 2003: 7th round, 239th overall pick

Career history
- New England Patriots (2003–2006); San Francisco 49ers (2007–2008); New England Patriots (2009–2010)

Awards and highlights
- 2× Super Bowl champion (XXXVIII, XXXIX); First-team All-Pac-10 (2002)

Career NFL statistics
- Total tackles: 249
- Sacks: 27.5
- Forced fumbles: 4
- Pass deflections: 5
- Interceptions: 1
- Defensive touchdowns: 1
- Stats at Pro Football Reference

Tully Cameron Banta-Cain (born August 28, 1980) is an American former professional football player who was a linebacker in the National Football League (NFL). He was selected by the New England Patriots in the seventh round of the 2003 NFL draft. He played college football for the California Golden Bears.

Banta-Cain was a part of two Super Bowl-winning teams during his first stint with the Patriots. He also played for the San Francisco 49ers.

== Early life ==
Tully Banta-Cain is of African-American and Scottish/Irish descent. He is the cousin of former NBA forward Rodney Rogers and former MLB outfielder Jeffrey Leonard.

While attending Fremont High School in Sunnyvale, California, Banta-Cain won All-League honors playing outside linebacker as a senior, was the League's Defensive Player of the Year as a junior, and gained more than 1,000 yards as a running back.

== College career ==
Banta-Cain played college football at the University of California, Berkeley, where he finished his career with 112 tackles and 26.5 sacks for the California Golden Bears. He also holds Cal's single game sack record (4.5). He redshirted in 1998, and then appeared in five games as a freshman in 1999. As a sophomore, Banta-Cain recorded 35 tackles and 5.5 sacks, and as a junior in 2001, he started every game at defensive end and tallied eight sacks and 33 tackles. As a senior in 2002, Banta-Cain was named to the All-Pac-10 first team and was the team's Defensive Most Valuable Player, finishing with 39 tackles, 13 sacks, and 22 tackles for a loss. His 26.5 career sacks ranked third in the school's record books behind Regan Upshaw and Andre Carter.

While at Berkeley, Banta-Cain was a member of the Sigma Phi Society of the Thorsen House.

== Professional career ==
=== New England Patriots (first stint) ===
Banta-Cain was selected by the New England Patriots in the seventh round (239th overall) in the 2003 NFL draft. In his rookie season, he played in nine games recording 11 tackles and one sack. In 2004, he played in all 16 games and finished the season with 28 tackles, 1.5 sacks and his first career interception again against the Buffalo Bills on November 14. He also was part of the Super Bowl XXXVIII winning team. The following season, he only managed to record nine tackles and 0.5 sacks but again was part of the team which won Super Bowl XXXIX. In his final year with the Patriots, he played in all 16 games including five starts and finished the season with 43 tackles and a career-high 5.5 sacks.

=== San Francisco 49ers ===
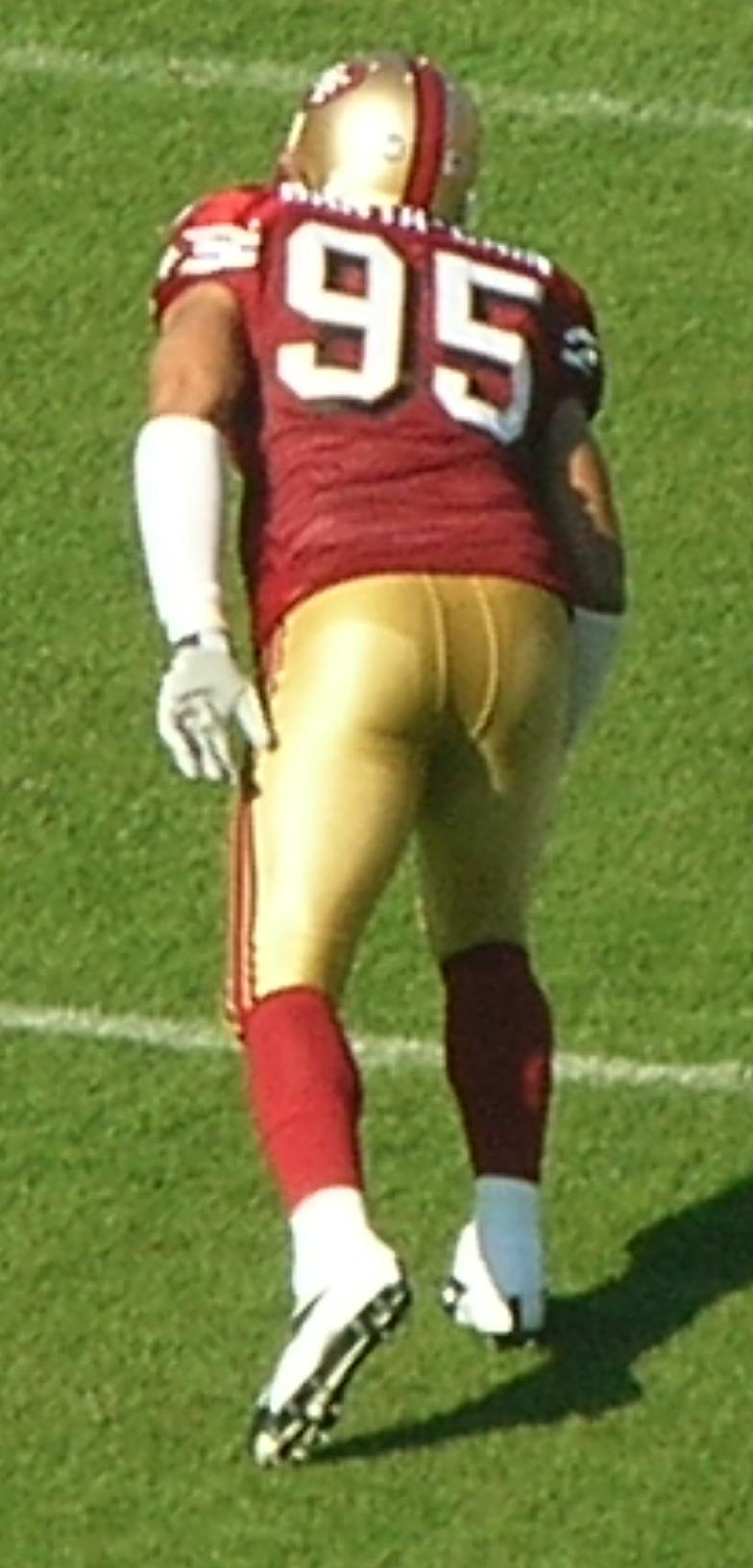
Banta-Cain with the 49ers in 2008

Banta-Cain was signed to a 3-year $12 million deal by the San Francisco 49ers as an unrestricted free agent on March 3, 2007. In his debut season, Banta-Cain started in four consecutive games until suffering a high ankle sprain during the 2nd quarter of a close 9–7 loss to the Baltimore Ravens. However, Banta-Cain continued to play due to a timely bye week following the injury, allowing him to not miss a game and still record a career-high 61 tackles and 3.5 sack on the year. He also scored the game-winning touchdown, in a November 25, 2007 game against the Arizona Cardinals, by recovering a fumble in the endzone in overtime. The win snapped an eight-game losing streak. He ended the year with ten starts and the 49ers ended the season with a 5–11 record. In his second season with the 49ers, Banta-Cain was inactive for the first four games of the season under Mike Nolan then activated to start on sub packages and special teams against the New England Patriots recording a half a sack and 5 tackles. Banta-Cain did not play another defensive snap for the season; however, he did manage to lead the team with 20 Special Teams tackles on a 6th ranked Special Teams unit coached by Al Everest (now with the Pittsburgh Steelers). The team finished with a 7–9 record. He was released under Mike Singletary on February 10, 2009.

=== New England Patriots (second stint) ===
Just eight days after his release from the 49ers, Banta-Cain was re-signed by the Patriots on February 18, 2009. Banta-Cain was released on October 19 and reportedly re-signed the next day to a new contract through the 2011 season. However, the signing was not official as of the end of the regular season. He started 10 of the 16 games he played in 2009, recording 55 tackles and a career-high 10 sacks.

Banta-Cain was officially re-signed to a three-year contract on March 5, 2010, the first day of free agency. The deal included a $6 million signing bonus, and averages $4.5 million per year. However, that yearly average could be raised to as high as $6 million if all performance incentives are met, raising the maximum value of the 3-year deal to $19 million.

In Week 2 of the 2010 season, Banta-Cain started against the New York Jets, recording eight tackles and one sack in the Patriots loss. In the second quarter, Banta-Cain was penalized 15 yards for unnecessary roughness, and was pulled from the game in favor of rookie Jermaine Cunningham, who replaced Banta-Cain as a starter in the Patriots' base defense for the next game. Banta-Cain went on to make 6 starts in 15 games played, recording 45 tackles and five sacks.

On July 29, 2011, it was announced that Banta-Cain had been released by the New England Patriots.

== NFL career statistics ==
Legend
**Bold**	Career high

=== Regular season ===
Year	Team	Games		Tackles					Interceptions					Fumbles			
Year	Team	GP	GS	Cmb	Solo	Ast	Sck	TFL	Int	Yds	TD	Lng	PD	FF	FR	Yds	TD
2003	NWE	9	0	11	9	2	1.0	1	0	0	0	0	0	0	0	0	0
2004	NWE	**16**	0	28	18	10	1.5	1	**1**	**4**	0	**4**	1	0	**1**	0	0
2005	NWE	13	0	9	6	3	0.5	0	0	0	0	0	0	0	0	0	0
2006	NWE	**16**	5	42	30	12	5.5	5	0	0	0	0	0	1	0	0	0
2007	SFO	**16**	**10**	41	30	11	3.5	5	0	0	0	0	**2**	0	**1**	0	**1**
2008	SFO	12	0	18	12	6	0.5	0	0	0	0	0	0	0	0	0	0
2009	NWE	**16**	**10**	**55**	35	**20**	**10.0**	**12**	0	0	0	0	**2**	**2**	0	0	0
2010	NWE	15	6	45	**36**	9	5.0	5	0	0	0	0	0	1	0	0	0
Career		113	31	249	176	73	27.5	29	1	4	0	4	5	4	2	0	1

=== Playoffs ===
Year	Team	Games		Tackles					Interceptions					Fumbles			
Year	Team	GP	GS	Cmb	Solo	Ast	Sck	TFL	Int	Yds	TD	Lng	PD	FF	FR	Yds	TD
2003	NWE	2	0	1	1	0	0.0	0	0	0	0	0	0	0	0	0	0
2004	NWE	**3**	0	2	1	1	0.0	0	0	0	0	0	0	0	0	0	0
2005	NWE	2	0	1	1	0	0.0	0	0	0	0	0	0	0	0	0	0
2006	NWE	**3**	**2**	**6**	**6**	0	**2.0**	**2**	0	0	0	0	**1**	0	**1**	0	0
2009	NWE	1	1	2	0	**2**	0.0	0	**1**	0	0	0	**1**	0	0	0	0
2010	NWE	1	0	1	1	0	0.0	0	0	0	0	0	0	0	0	0	0
Career		12	3	13	10	3	2.0	2	1	0	0	0	2	0	1	0	0
