= Dexter Reid =

American football player (born 1981)

No. 42, 36
- Position: Safety

Personal information
- Born: March 18, 1981 (age 45); Norfolk, Virginia, U.S.
- Listed height: 5 ft 11 in (1.80 m)
- Listed weight: 203 lb (92 kg)

Career information
- High school: Granby (Norfolk)
- College: North Carolina
- NFL draft: 2004: 4th round, 113th overall pick

Career history
- New England Patriots (2004); Indianapolis Colts (2005–2006)

Awards and highlights
- 2× Super Bowl champion (XXXIX, XLI); First-team All-ACC (2002); Second-team All-ACC (2003)

Career NFL statistics
- Total tackles: 46
- Forced fumbles: 2
- Fumble recoveries: 2
- Pass deflections: 4
- Stats at Pro Football Reference

Dexter Devon Reid Jr. (born March 18, 1981) is an American former professional football player who was a safety in the National Football League (NFL). He was selected by the New England Patriots in the fourth round of the 2004 NFL draft after playing college football for the North Carolina Tar Heels. Reid is a two-time Super Bowl champion, having won a trophy with the Patriots and Indianapolis Colts in 2005 and 2007 respectively.

== Early life ==
Reid attended Granby High School in Norfolk, Virginia where he was an honorable mention All-USA Today selection, the district Player of the Year and first-team all-state selection as a senior making 62 tackles, 3 interceptions and 5 blocked field goals. He also played quarterback on offense and had 1,400 yards total offense.

In his career, he passed for 2,000 yards and 20 touchdowns along with 960 yards rushing and 12 scores.

In addition, he competed in track and basketball, winning the state triple jump title as a senior and earning a two-time all-district selection in basketball.

== College career ==
"If I had 11 Dexter Reids, we'd be the best defense in the country. I can't say enough good things about him. He is an all-around football player and brings great leadership to our defense."

— Former UNC defensive coordinator Dave Huxtable.

After being redshirted in 1999 as a freshman, Reid served as a backup safety, playing primarily special teams in 2000. He finished the season fifth on the team with 69 tackles (35 solo) and recorded a fumble recovery, an interception and 6 pass deflections.

In 2001, he started all 13 games and ended the season third on the team with 99 tackles (67 solo), 5 tackles for loss, 2 sacks, 2 interceptions—one of which he returned for a touchdown-5 pass break-ups and a fumble recovery.

As a junior in 2002, Reid started all 12 games at free safety and earned first-team All-ACC honors as he finished second in the nation with 13.8 tackles per game. He recorded a total of 166 tackles, just five shy of the school record of 171 set by linebacker Buddy Curry in 1979 and also set a school record for tackles by a defensive back with his 119th stop against the University of Maryland. In addition, Reid also had 6 tackles for loss, a sack, 2 forced fumbles and 4 pass break-ups.

As a senior in 2003, Reid first-team All-ACC honors for the second straight season, compiling 132 tackles (95 solo), 3.5 tackles for loss and 3 pass break-ups.

In the first game of the 2003 season, Greg Jones of Florida State sent Dexter Reid into another dimension with a stiff arm that shook the foundation of the Earth. In spite of this, Reid would find a way to make it back to this dimension and go on to have a successful NFL career.

He majored in management and information systems.

== Professional career ==
=== New England Patriots ===
Reid was selected in the fourth round (113th overall) by the New England Patriots in 2004.

Starting two games his rookie season appearing in 13 regular season games, he recorded 23 tackles (15 solo), 2 pass break-ups and a forced fumble. He also played in three play-off games and won a Super Bowl ring despite blowing a coverage that resulted in a Greg Lewis touchdown in Super Bowl XXXIX.

On August 29, 2005, Reid was released by the Patriots.

=== Indianapolis Colts ===
He was promptly signed by the Indianapolis Colts three days later.

Playing for the Colts in 2005, Reid was active for 16 games, recording 10 tackles (8 solo) and a forced fumble. In 2006, he was active for 10 regular season games, starting one and finished the season with 11 tackles (all solo) and 2 pass break-ups. He was also active throughout the playoffs and won his second ring in Super Bowl XLI.

=== NFL career statistics ===
==== Games ====
Year	Age	Team	Position	Number	Games	Games Started
2004	23	NWE	ss	42	13	2
2005	24	IND		36	16	0
2006	25	IND	ss	36	10	1
Career					39	3
2 yrs		IND			26	1
1 yr		NWE			13	2

==== Defensive Interceptions ====
Year	Team	Interceptions	Yards	Touchdowns	Long	Passes Defended
2004	NWE	ss	42	13	2	2
2005	IND		36	16	0	
2006	IND	ss	36	10	1	2
Career			39	3	0	4
2 yrs	IND		26	1	0	2
1 yr	NWE		13	2	0	2

==== Fumbles ====
Year	Team	Forced Fumbles	Fumbles	Fumbles Recovered	Yards	Touchdowns
2004	NWE	1	0	1	0	0
2005	IND	1	0	1	0	0
2006	IND					
Career		2	0	2	0	0
2 yrs	IND	1	0	1	0	0
1 yr	NWE	1	0	1	0	0

==== Sacks and tackles ====
Year	Team	Sacks	Combo Sacks	Solo Sacks	Tackle Assist	Tackles For Loss	QB Hits	Safety
2004	NWE	0	25	16	9	0		
2005	IND	0	10	8	2	0		
2006	IND	0	11	11	0	0	0	
Career		0	46	35	11	0	0	
2 yrs	IND	0	21	19	2	0	0	
1 yr	NWE	0	25	16	9	0		

== Personal life ==
Reid's father, Dexter Reid Sr., played basketball at Virginia Tech and Granby High School.
