= Zeron Flemister =

American football player (born 1976)

No. 89, 88
- Position: Tight end

Personal information
- Born: September 8, 1976 (age 50); Sioux City, Iowa, U.S.
- Listed height: 6 ft 4 in (1.93 m)
- Listed weight: 250 lb (113 kg)

Career information
- College: Iowa
- NFL draft: 2000: undrafted

Career history
- 2000–2003: Washington Redskins
- 2004: New England Patriots
- 2005: Oakland Raiders

Career NFL statistics
- Receptions: 38
- Receiving yards: 439
- Receiving touchdowns: 4
- Stats at Pro Football Reference

Zeron D. Flemister (born September 8, 1976) is an American former professional football player who was a tight end in the National Football League (NFL). As a senior playing college football for the Iowa Hawkeyes, he played in and started seven games before playing in three postseason all-star games. Flemister was then signed as a free agent by the Washington Redskins in 2000.
