= Tyrone Poole =

American football player (born 1972)

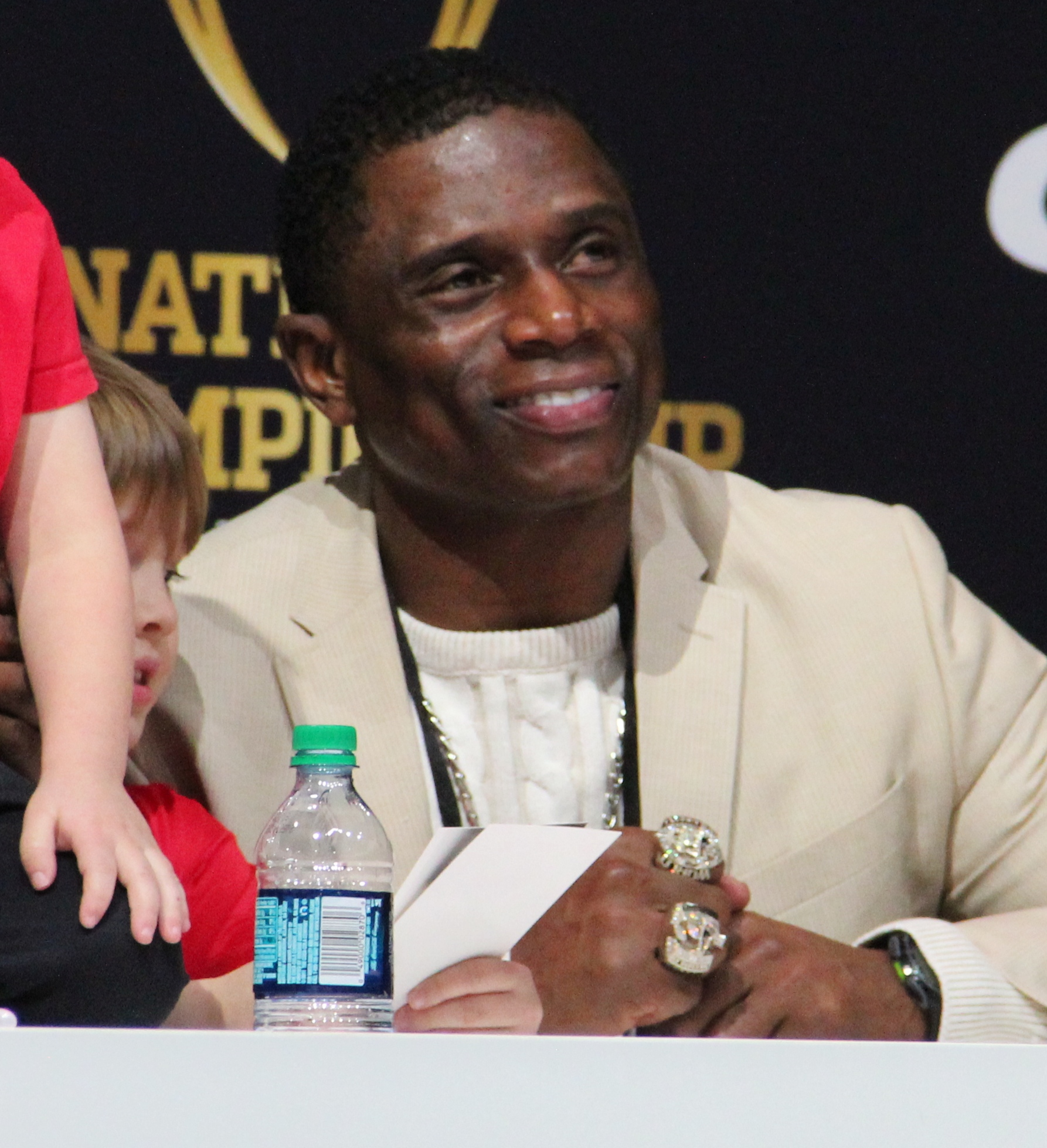
- Poole in 2018

No. 38, 37
- Position: Cornerback

Personal information
- Born: February 3, 1972 (age 54); LaGrange, Georgia, U.S.
- Listed height: 5 ft 8 in (1.73 m)
- Listed weight: 190 lb (86 kg)

Career information
- High school: LaGrange
- College: Fort Valley State
- NFL draft: 1995: 1st round, 22nd overall pick

Career history
- Carolina Panthers (1995–1997); Indianapolis Colts (1998–2000); Denver Broncos (2001–2002); New England Patriots (2003–2005); Oakland Raiders (2006); Houston Texans (2007)*; Denver Broncos (2008)*; Tennessee Titans (2008)
- * Offseason or practice squad member only

Awards and highlights
- 2× Super Bowl champion (XXXVIII, XXXIX); PFWA All-Rookie Team (1995)

Career NFL statistics
- Tackles: 486
- Sacks: 6
- Forced fumbles: 9
- Fumble recoveries: 5
- Passes defended: 61
- Interceptions: 18
- Stats at Pro Football Reference

Tyrone Poole (born February 3, 1972) is an American former professional football player who played 13 seasons as a cornerback in the National Football League (NFL). He played college football for the Fort Valley State Wildcats. He was selected by the Carolina Panthers 22nd overall of the 1995 NFL draft.

Poole has also played for Indianapolis Colts, Denver Broncos, New England Patriots, Oakland Raiders and Tennessee Titans. He earned Super Bowl rings with the Patriots in Super Bowl XXXVIII and Super Bowl XXXIX.

In 2011, Poole released a book, "Ultimate Success in the Game of Life," that chronicles his life, going from poverty, to quitting football his senior year at LaGrange High School, to winning the Super Bowl.

== Early life ==
Poole graduated from LaGrange High School, where he lettered in both football and track.

== College career ==
Poole was as a four-year starter at Fort Valley State University and became the first player from that school to ever be selected in the first round of the NFL draft. His career numbers included 41 starts in 42 games with 17 interceptions (262 yards) and 70 punt returns for 934 yards (13.3 avg). Poole also set the school record for the 200-meter dash and finished second in the national finals.

He majored in business.

== Professional career ==
Pre-draft measurables
Height	Weight	Arm length	Hand span	40-yard dash	10-yard split	20-yard split	20-yard shuttle	Vertical jump	Broad jump	Bench press
5 ft 8 1/2 in (1.74 m)	185 lb (84 kg)	30 1/2 in (0.77 m)	9 5/8 in (0.24 m)	4.53 s	1.61 s	2.63 s	3.90 s	35.0 in (0.89 m)	10 ft 3 in (3.12 m)	18 reps
All values from NFL Combine

=== Carolina Panthers ===
Poole was selected by the Carolina Panthers in the first round (22nd overall) of the 1995 NFL draft out of Fort Valley State University. He was the second draft choice in Panthers history behind Kerry Collins. He spent three years anchoring the Panthers' secondary.

=== Indianapolis Colts ===
Poole was traded to the Indianapolis Colts in 1998 in exchange for a second-round selection in the 1999 NFL draft. He played three years for the Colts, starting almost every game.

=== First stint with Broncos ===
Poole signed with the Denver Broncos as a free agent before the 2001 season, however, he spent the entire 2001 NFL season on the reserve squad. He returned to full-time play for the 2002 season.

=== New England Patriots ===
Poole signed with the New England Patriots before the 2003 NFL season. The Patriots finished with a 14–2 record and had a victory in Super Bowl XXXVIII over the Carolina Panthers.

Poole started the 2004 season again as a starting cornerback, but injured his knee in a Week 6 matchup with Seattle. Poole returned briefly for a few snaps near the end of a Week 14 game against Cincinnati, but was shut down after this and did not play again for the rest of the season. Still, the Patriots went on to win Super Bowl XXXIX, giving Poole his second Super Bowl ring, even though Poole did not play in the game due to his knee injury.

For the 2005 season, Poole once again began the season as a starting cornerback. However, after playing against Oakland in Week 1, he injured his ankle and would not play again all season. The Patriots were eliminated in the divisional round and Poole parted ways with New England.

=== Oakland Raiders ===
Poole signed with the Oakland Raiders in the 2006 offseason where he saw action as a reserve player. He was released after the 2006 season.

=== Houston Texans ===
Poole was signed by the Houston Texans during the 2007 preseason. However, he was released by the team during final cuts.

=== Second stint with Broncos ===
Poole signed with the Denver Broncos on August 13, 2008, but was released on August 30.

=== Tennessee Titans ===
Poole was signed by the Tennessee Titans on November 22, 2008, after cornerbacks Reynaldo Hill and Eric King were placed on injured reserve.

== NFL career statistics ==
Legend
**Bold**	Career high

=== Regular season ===
Year	Team	Games		Tackles					Interceptions					Fumbles			
Year	Team	GP	GS	Cmb	Solo	Ast	Sck	TFL	Int	Yds	TD	Lng	PD	FF	FR	Yds	TD
1995	CAR	**16**	13	**68**	**59**	9	**2.0**	-	2	8	0	4	-	**3**	0	0	0
1996	CAR	15	15	**68**	57	11	0.0	-	1	35	0	35	-	0	1	0	0
1997	CAR	**16**	**16**	52	48	4	1.0	-	2	0	0	0	-	1	**3**	**11**	0
1998	IND	15	15	61	52	9	0.0	-	1	0	0	0	-	0	0	0	0
1999	IND	15	14	39	33	6	1.0	**2**	3	**85**	0	38	15	0	0	0	0
2000	IND	15	12	49	38	11	0.0	**2**	1	1	0	1	8	1	1	8	0
2002	DEN	**16**	4	54	44	10	1.0	**2**	0	0	0	0	10	0	0	0	0
2003	NWE	**16**	**16**	60	47	**13**	0.0	0	**6**	81	0	**44**	**21**	**3**	0	0	0
2004	NWE	5	4	14	13	1	0.0	0	1	21	0	21	3	1	0	0	0
2005	NWE	1	1	1	1	0	0.0	0	0	0	0	0	0	0	0	0	0
2006	OAK	12	2	15	14	1	1.0	0	1	0	0	0	4	0	0	0	0
2008	TEN	2	0	5	3	2	0.0	0	0	0	0	0	0	0	0	0	0
		144	112	486	409	77	6.0	6	18	231	0	44	61	9	5	19	0

=== Playoffs ===
Year	Team	Games		Tackles					Interceptions					Fumbles			
Year	Team	GP	GS	Cmb	Solo	Ast	Sck	TFL	Int	Yds	TD	Lng	PD	FF	FR	Yds	TD
1996	CAR	2	2	**12**	**11**	1	0.0	-	0	0	0	0	0	0	0	0	0
1999	IND	1	1	1	1	0	0.0	0	0	0	0	0	**1**	0	0	0	0
2000	IND	1	0	0	0	0	0.0	0	0	0	0	0	0	0	0	0	0
2003	NWE	**3**	**3**	**12**	8	**4**	0.0	0	0	0	0	0	**1**	0	**1**	0	0
		7	6	25	20	5	0.0	0	0	0	0	0	2	0	1	0	0
