= Christian Morton =

American football player (born 1981)

No. 30, 35
- Position: Cornerback

Personal information
- Born: April 28, 1981 (age 45); St. Louis, Missouri, U.S.
- Listed height: 6 ft 0 in (1.83 m)
- Listed weight: 190 lb (86 kg)

Career information
- High school: Riverview Gardens (St. Louis)
- College: Illinois
- NFL draft: 2004: 7th round, 233rd overall pick

Career history
- New England Patriots (2004)*; New Orleans Saints (2004)*; Cleveland Browns (2004)*; Atlanta Falcons (2004); Washington Redskins (2005)*; Atlanta Falcons (2005); Washington Redskins (2005); Carolina Panthers (2006); Denver Broncos (2008)*; Tennessee Titans (2009)*
- * Offseason or practice squad member only

Career NFL statistics
- Tackles: 23
- Interceptions: 1
- Fumble recoveries: 1
- Stats at Pro Football Reference

Christian John Morton (born April 28, 1981) is an American former professional football player who was a cornerback in the National Football League (NFL). He was selected by the New England Patriots in the seventh round of the 2004 NFL draft. He played college football for the Illinois Fighting Illini.

Morton was also a member of the New Orleans Saints, Cleveland Browns, Atlanta Falcons, Washington Redskins, Carolina Panthers, Denver Broncos and Tennessee Titans.

== Early life ==
Morton attended Riverview Gardens High School in St. Louis, Missouri, where he won the Missouri 5A state championship his Senior season as the starting quarterback and cornerback.

== College career ==
Morton played college football at the University of Illinois. He was initially recruited as a quarterback and played there the first two years. He then made the switch to cornerback in spring drills in 2000.

== Professional career ==
=== New England Patriots ===
Morton was selected in the seventh round of the 2004 NFL draft with the 233rd overall pick by the New England Patriots, the last pick of the draft before the supplemental picks. He was released from the Patriots before the 2004 season.

=== Atlanta Falcons (second stint) ===
Morton spent the 2005 training camp with the Falcons before being waived on August 26, 2005. Atlanta re-signed Morton on September 15, 2005, and saw action in three games, including one start. He was released by the Falcons on November 30, 2005.

=== Washington Redskins (second stint) ===
On December 16, the Washington Redskins signed Morton to the practice squad. The Redskins promoted Morton to the active roster on December 28, and Morton made his debut for the Redskins on January 1, 2006.

=== Carolina Panthers ===
Morton was signed mid-season in 2006 by the Carolina Panthers and saw action in seven games before being place on the injured reserve list with a hamstring injury on December 12, 2006. In those seven games he recorded 11 tackles, one interception, and one pass deflected.

=== Tennessee Titans ===
After spending the 2008 season out of football, Morton was signed by the Tennessee Titans on January 8, 2009. He was released on July 7, 2009.
