= 2006 New England Patriots season =

47th season in franchise history

- Owner: Robert Kraft
- Head coach: Bill Belichick
- Offensive coordinator: Josh McDaniels
- Defensive coordinator: Dean Pees
- Home stadium: Gillette Stadium

Results
- Record: 12–4
- Division place: 1st AFC East
- Playoffs: Won Wild Card Playoffs (vs. Jets) 37–16; Won Divisional Playoffs (at Chargers) 24–21; Lost AFC Championship (at Colts) 34–38
- All-Pros: DE Richard Seymour (2nd team)
- Pro Bowlers: OT Matt Light; DE Richard Seymour

Uniform

The 2006 season was the New England Patriots' 37th in the National Football League (NFL), their 47th overall and their seventh under head coach Bill Belichick. They finished with a 12–4 record and a division title before losing to the Indianapolis Colts in the playoffs.

The Patriots entered the season without their two starting wide receivers from 2005; David Givens left in free agency while Deion Branch held out for a new contract before being traded in early September. They were eventually replaced with Reche Caldwell and Jabar Gaffney, who was signed as a street free agent in October. Back-to-back losses in November ended the team's streak of 57 games without consecutive losses, three games shy of the NFL record. The field surface of Gillette Stadium was changed from natural grass to Field Turf in time for the November 26 game against Chicago.

With a 12–4 record and their fourth straight division title, the Patriots entered the playoffs as the fourth seed. They defeated the New York Jets in the wild-card round. A close win over the top-seeded 14–2 San Diego Chargers on the road in the divisional round set the Patriots up to face their rival Indianapolis Colts in the AFC Championship Game. Despite opening up a 21–3 lead, the Patriots stumbled down the stretch at the RCA Dome and the Colts emerged with a 38–34 victory, from which they would go on to win Super Bowl XLI.

This would be the last year the Patriots would win a Wild Card game until 2025. For many years, this was primarily due to securing the no. 1 or no. 2 seed and receiving the first-round bye when entering the playoffs. They would play in a total of three more Wild Card games before 2025, losing all three of them. These games occurred in 2009, 2019 and 2021.

== Offseason ==
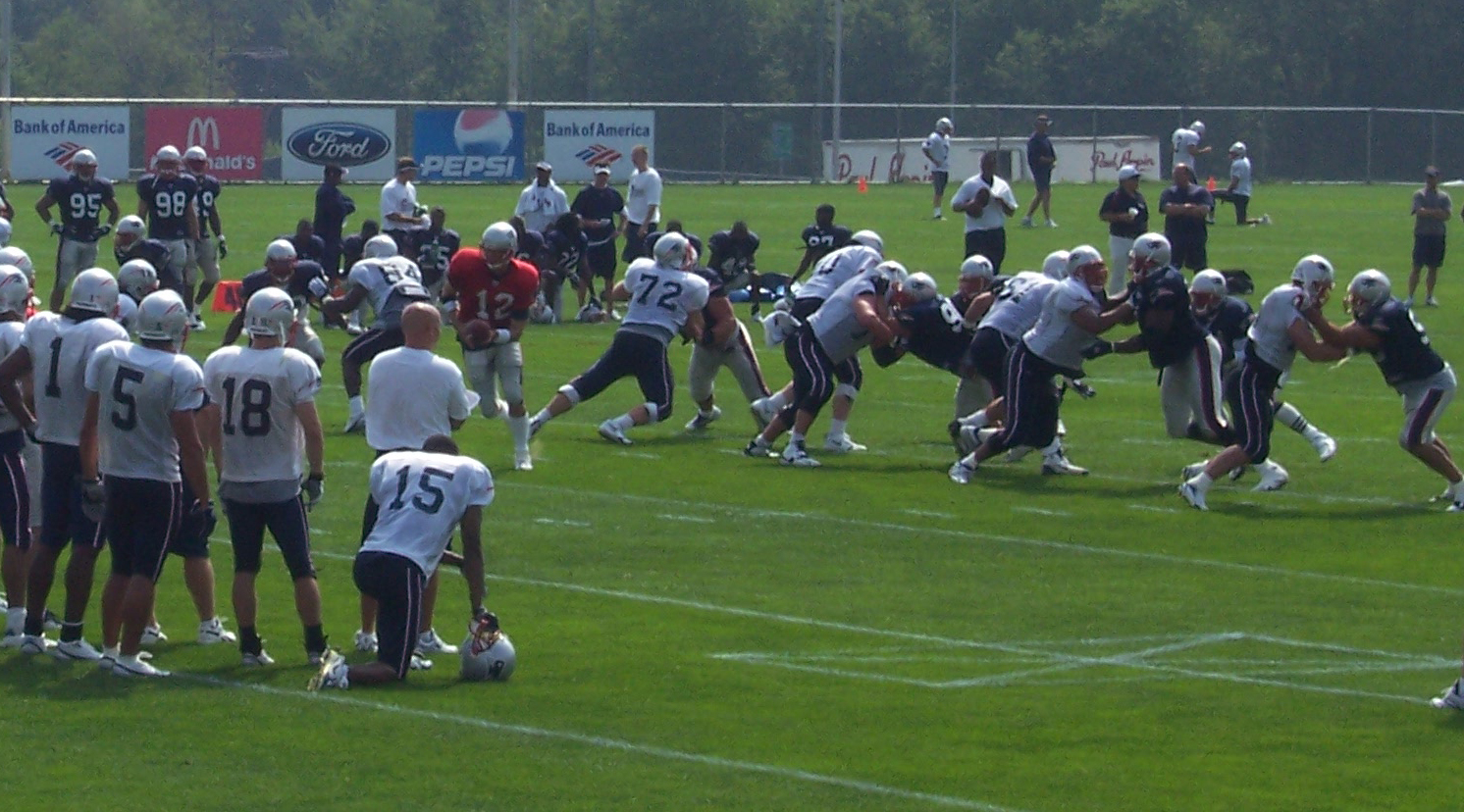
The Patriots during the first practice of training camp

=== Staff changes ===
First-year defensive coordinator Eric Mangini was hired to be head coach of the New York Jets, marking the second year in a row that New England's defensive coordinator was hired as a head coach. He would be replaced as defensive coordinator by Dean Pees, who had been linebackers coach for the club the past two years and as secondary coach by assistant secondary coach Joel Collier. Assistant offensive line coach Matt Patricia was moved to linebackers coach to replace Pees. Quarterbacks coach Josh McDaniels was promoted to offensive coordinator after New England went one season without replacing former offensive coordinator Charlie Weis. Defensive coaching assistant Mike Judge was moved to an offensive coaching assistant, while Josh Boyer and Kevin Bickers joined the coaching staff as defensive and special teams coaching assistants, respectively.

=== Departures ===
Free agency saw multiple departures for the Patriots, including long-time kicker Adam Vinatieri signing with the Indianapolis Colts, and wide receiver David Givens signing with the Tennessee Titans. Linebacker Willie McGinest, the Patriots' first-round pick in the 1994 NFL draft, was released on March 9 and signed with the Cleveland Browns six days later. Tyrone Poole, Duane Starks, and Chad Brown were also released early in the offseason, with Brown returning for training camp before being cut again prior to the start of the season. Other free agency departures were André Davis (Buffalo Bills), Christian Fauria (Washington Redskins), Matt Chatham (New York Jets), Tim Dwight (New York Jets), Tom Ashworth (Seattle Seahawks), and Michael Stone (Houston Texans).

The preseason also saw the eventual loss of Super Bowl MVP wide receiver Deion Branch. Branch held out all of mini-camp, training camp, the preseason and into the regular season before eventually being traded to the Seattle Seahawks for a first-round pick in the 2007 NFL draft on September 11.

Also during the preseason, on August 8, offensive lineman Ross Tucker was traded to the Cleveland Browns for a conditional late-round 2007 draft pick. Two weeks later, offensive tackle Brandon Gorin was traded to the Arizona Cardinals for another conditional 2007 draft choice, which later became one of the Patriots' four picks of the 2007 sixth round. As the Patriots made their final roster cut-downs, they also traded running back Patrick Cobbs to the Pittsburgh Steelers on September 1 for a conditional 2007 draft pick. Both Tucker and Cobbs did not make their respective rosters and the Patriots did not receive the conditional picks.

=== Arrivals ===
The offseason brought the arrival of fifth-year wide receiver Reche Caldwell from the San Diego Chargers, who would become the Patriots' leading receiver in 2006. Another acquisition came during the preseason, when the Patriots signed veteran linebacker Junior Seau, who had retired just four days earlier. Other arrivals were Mel Mitchell, Martin Gramatica, Tebucky Jones, and Barry Gardner. Free agents or potential free agents Don Davis, Hank Poteat, Ross Tucker, Artrell Hawkins, Chad Scott, Troy Brown, Stephen Neal, and Heath Evans were all re-signed, while Richard Seymour, Dan Koppen, and Russ Hochstein all received long-term contract extensions.

On June 5, the Patriots traded wide receiver Bethel Johnson to the New Orleans Saints for defensive tackle Johnathan Sullivan, the sixth overall pick in the 2003 NFL draft. Sullivan was arrested on June 30 in New Orleans, Louisiana for marijuana possession after being stopped for a vehicle music noise violation. Neither players made their respective rosters to begin the 2006 season.

On September 2, wide receiver Doug Gabriel was traded to the Patriots from the Oakland Raiders in exchange for the Patriots' 2007 fifth-round pick.

=== 2006 NFL draft ===
2006 New England Patriots Draft Selections
| Round | Overall | Player | Position | College |
|---|---|---|---|---|
| 1 | 21 | Laurence Maroney | Running back | Minnesota |
| 2 | 36 | Chad Jackson | Wide receiver | Florida |
| 3 | 86 | David Thomas | Tight end | Texas |
| 4 | 106 | Garrett Mills | Tight end | Tulsa |
| 4 | 118 | Stephen Gostkowski | Kicker | Memphis |
| 5 | 136 | Ryan O'Callaghan | Offensive tackle | California |
| 6 | 191 | Jeremy Mincey | Defensive end | Florida |
| 6 | 205 | Dan Stevenson | Offensive guard | Notre Dame |
| 6 | 206 | Le Kevin Smith | Defensive tackle | Nebraska |
| 7 | 229 | Willie Andrews | Safety | Baylor |

| compensatory selection |

== Staff ==
2006 New England Patriots staff
| Front office: Chairman/CEO – Robert Kraft; President – Jonathan Kraft; Vice president of player personnel – Scott Pioli; Director of pro personnel – Nick Caserio; Director of college scouting – Thomas Dimitroff; Football research director – Ernie Adams; Head coaches: Head coach – Bill Belichick; Assistant head coach/offensive line – Dante Scarnecchia; Offensive coaches: Offensive coordinator/quarterbacks – Josh McDaniels; Running backs – Ivan Fears; Wide receivers – Brian Daboll; Tight ends – Pete Mangurian; Coaching assistant – Mike Judge | Defensive coaches: Defensive coordinator – Dean Pees; Defensive line – Pepper Johnson; Linebackers – Matt Patricia; Secondary – Joel Collier; Coaching assistant – Josh Boyer; Special teams coaches: Special teams – Brad Seely; Coaching assistant – Kevin Bickers; Strength and conditioning: Strength and conditioning – Mike Woicik; Assistant strength and conditioning – Harold Nash |

== Opening training camp roster ==
As of the Patriots' first training camp practice at Gillette Stadium on July 28, they had the NFL maximum of 80 players signed to their roster. Deion Branch did not count against the limit as he held out of training camp and was placed on the Reserve/Did Not Report list. Also, the Patriots received eight total roster exemptions for the NFL Europe allocations of Earl Charles, Todd Mortensen, Rich Musinski, Zuriel Smith, Antwain Spann, Nick Steitz, and Ray Ventrone (one for each player, plus one bonus exemption because of the time Ventrone spent on a practice squad in 2006).

New England Patriots 2006 opening training camp roster
| Quarterbacks: 12 Tom Brady; 10 Corey Bramlet ^{UR}; 16 Matt Cassel; 6 Todd Mortensen; Running backs: -- Earl Charles; 41 Patrick Cobbs ^{UR}; 28 Corey Dillon; 44 Heath Evans FB; 33 Kevin Faulk PR; 39 Laurence Maroney KR ^{R}; Wide receivers: 80 Troy Brown; 87 Reche Caldwell; 19 Erik Davis ^{UR}; 1 Keron Henry; 15 Michael McGrew; 5 Rich Musinski; 18 Matt Shelton ^{UR}; -- Zuriel Smith; 15 John Stone; Tight ends: 82 Daniel Graham; 45 Garrett Mills ^{R}; 88 Walter Rasby; 86 David Thomas ^{R}; 84 Benjamin Watson | Offensive linemen: 62 Brian Barthelmes C ^{UR}; 65 Wesley Britt T; 76 Brandon Gorin T; 60 Randy Hand T ^{UR}; 71 Russ Hochstein G; 72 Matt Light T; 70 Logan Mankins G; 64 Gene Mruczkowski G; 61 Stephen Neal G; 68 Ryan O'Callaghan T ^{R}; 69 Ross Tucker G; 75 Nick Steitz G; 63 Dan Stevenson G ^{R}; 74 Billy Yates G; Defensive linemen: 97 Jarvis Green DE; 91 Marquise Hill DE; 90 Dan Klecko NT; 65 Le Kevin Smith DE ^{R}; 92 Santonio Thomas DE; 94 Ty Warren DE; 75 Vince Wilfork NT; 99 Mike Wright NT | Linebackers: 49 Eric Alexander ILB; 95 Tully Banta-Cain OLB; 52 Monty Beisel ILB; 98 Chad Brown OLB; 54 Tedy Bruschi ILB; 59 Rosevelt Colvin OLB; 51 Don Davis ILB; 47 Barry Gardner ILB; 53 Larry Izzo ILB; 46 Corey Mays ILB ^{UR}; 58 Jeremy Mincey OLB ^{R}; 48 Freddie Roach ILB ^{UR}; 50 Mike Vrabel OLB; 45 Pierre Woods OLB ^{UR}; Defensive backs: 38 Willie Andrews SS ^{R}; 43 Vernell Brown CB ^{UR}; 25 Artrell Hawkins SS; 27 Ellis Hobbs CB; 34 Tebucky Jones FS; 24 Mel Mitchell FS; 32 Hank Poteat CB; 22 Asante Samuel CB; 36 James Sanders SS; 30 Chad Scott CB; 29 Guss Scott FS; 31 Antwain Spann CB; 41 Ray Ventrone SS; 23 Eric Warfield CB; 26 Eugene Wilson FS; Special teams: 46 Jon Condo LS; 3 Stephen Gostkowski K ^{R}; 7 Martín Gramática K; 8 Josh Miller P | Reserve lists: 83 Deion Branch WR (did not report); 13 Bam Childress WR (active/PUP); 21 Randall Gay CB (active/PUP); 37 Rodney Harrison SS (active/PUP); 17 Chad Jackson WR (active/PUP) ^{R}; 77 Nick Kaczur OT (active/PUP); 67 Dan Koppen C (active/PUP); 35 Patrick Pass FB/RB (active/PUP); 66 Lonie Paxton LS (active/PUP); 93 Richard Seymour DE (active/PUP); 96 Johnathan Sullivan NT (active/PUP); Notations: R: 2006 rookie; UR: 2006 undrafted rookie; Italicized players are not on the 80-man roster. |

== Schedule ==
=== Preseason ===
| Week | Date | Opponent | Result | Record | Venue | Recap |
|---|---|---|---|---|---|---|
| 1 | August 11 | at Atlanta Falcons | L 23–26 | 0–1 | Georgia Dome | Recap |
| 2 | August 19 | Arizona Cardinals | W 30–3 | 1–1 | Gillette Stadium | Recap |
| 3 | August 26 | Washington Redskins | W 41–0 | 2–1 | Gillette Stadium | Recap |
| 4 | August 31 | at New York Giants | L 23–31 | 2–2 | Giants Stadium | Recap |

=== Regular season ===
| Week | Date | Opponent | Result | Record | Venue | Recap |
|---|---|---|---|---|---|---|
| 1 | September 10 | Buffalo Bills | W 19–17 | 1–0 | Gillette Stadium | Recap |
| 2 | September 17 | at New York Jets | W 24–17 | 2–0 | Giants Stadium | Recap |
| 3 | September 24 | Denver Broncos | L 7–17 | 2–1 | Gillette Stadium | Recap |
| 4 | October 1 | at Cincinnati Bengals | W 38–13 | 3–1 | Paul Brown Stadium | Recap |
| 5 | October 8 | Miami Dolphins | W 20–10 | 4–1 | Gillette Stadium | Recap |
| 6 | Bye | | | | | |
| 7 | October 22 | at Buffalo Bills | W 28–6 | 5–1 | Ralph Wilson Stadium | Recap |
| 8 | October 30 | at Minnesota Vikings | W 31–7 | 6–1 | Hubert H. Humphrey Metrodome | Recap |
| 9 | November 5 | Indianapolis Colts | L 20–27 | 6–2 | Gillette Stadium | Recap |
| 10 | November 12 | New York Jets | L 14–17 | 6–3 | Gillette Stadium | Recap |
| 11 | November 19 | at Green Bay Packers | W 35–0 | 7–3 | Lambeau Field | Recap |
| 12 | November 26 | Chicago Bears | W 17–13 | 8–3 | Gillette Stadium | Recap |
| 13 | December 3 | Detroit Lions | W 28–21 | 9–3 | Gillette Stadium | Recap |
| 14 | December 10 | at Miami Dolphins | L 0–21 | 9–4 | Dolphin Stadium | Recap |
| 15 | December 17 | Houston Texans | W 40–7 | 10–4 | Gillette Stadium | Recap |
| 16 | December 24 | at Jacksonville Jaguars | W 24–21 | 11–4 | Alltel Stadium | Recap |
| 17 | December 31 | at Tennessee Titans | W 40–23 | 12–4 | LP Field | Recap |

== Week 1 roster ==
New England Patriots 2006 Week 1 roster
| Quarterbacks: 12 Tom Brady; 16 Matt Cassel; Running backs: 28 Corey Dillon; 44 Heath Evans FB; 33 Kevin Faulk PR; 39 Laurence Maroney KR ^{R}; Wide receivers: 80 Troy Brown; 87 Reche Caldwell; 13 Bam Childress; 85 Doug Gabriel; 17 Chad Jackson ^{R}; Tight ends: 82 Daniel Graham; 45 Garrett Mills ^{R}; 86 David Thomas ^{R}; 84 Benjamin Watson | Offensive linemen: 65 Wesley Britt T; 71 Russ Hochstein G; 77 Nick Kaczur T; 67 Dan Koppen C; 72 Matt Light T; 70 Logan Mankins G; 64 Gene Mruczkowski G; 61 Stephen Neal G; 68 Ryan O'Callaghan T ^{R}; Defensive linemen: 97 Jarvis Green DE; 91 Marquise Hill DE; 93 Richard Seymour DE; 90 Le Kevin Smith DE ^{R}; 96 Johnathan Sullivan NT; 94 Ty Warren DE; 75 Vince Wilfork NT; 99 Mike Wright DE | Linebackers: 52 Eric Alexander ILB; 95 Tully Banta-Cain OLB; 54 Tedy Bruschi ILB; 59 Rosevelt Colvin OLB; 51 Don Davis ILB; 53 Larry Izzo ILB; 55 Junior Seau ILB; 50 Mike Vrabel OLB; 58 Pierre Woods OLB ^{UR}; Defensive backs: 23 Willie Andrews SS ^{R}; 21 Randall Gay CB; 37 Rodney Harrison SS; 25 Artrell Hawkins FS; 27 Ellis Hobbs CB; 22 Asante Samuel CB; 36 James Sanders SS; 30 Chad Scott CB; 26 Eugene Wilson FS; Special teams: 3 Stephen Gostkowski K ^{R}; 8 Josh Miller P; 66 Lonie Paxton LS | Reserve lists: 83 Deion Branch WR (did not report); -- Earl Charles RB (NFLE NF-Inj.); 47 Barry Gardner ILB (IR); 34 Tebucky Jones FS (IR); 15 Michael McGrew WR (Left Squad); 24 Mel Mitchell FS (IR); 35 Patrick Pass FB (PUP); 18 Matt Shelton WR (IR) ^{UR}; -- Zuriel Smith WR (NFLE NF-Inj.); 41 Ray Ventrone SS (NFLE NF-Inj.); 42 Gemara Williams CB (IR) ^{UR}; Practice squad: 19 Kelvin Kight WR; 46 Corey Mays ILB ^{UR}; 9 J. T. O'Sullivan QB; 31 Antwain Spann CB; 63 Dan Stevenson C ^{R}; 92 Santonio Thomas DE; 74 Billy Yates G; Notations: R: 2006 rookie; UR: 2006 Undrafted rookie; Italicized players are not on the 53-man roster. |

== Regular season results ==
=== Week 1: vs. Buffalo Bills ===
| Quarter | 1 | 2 | 3 | 4 | Total |
|---|---|---|---|---|---|
| Bills | 10 | 7 | 0 | 0 | 17 |
| Patriots | 7 | 0 | 7 | 5 | 19 |

at Gillette Stadium, Foxborough, Massachusetts

- Game time: 1:00 pm EDT
- Game weather: 63 °F (17 °C), partly cloudy
- Game attendance: 68,756
- Referee: Terry McAulay
- TV announcers (CBS): Jim Nantz (play-by-play) and Phil Simms (color commentator)

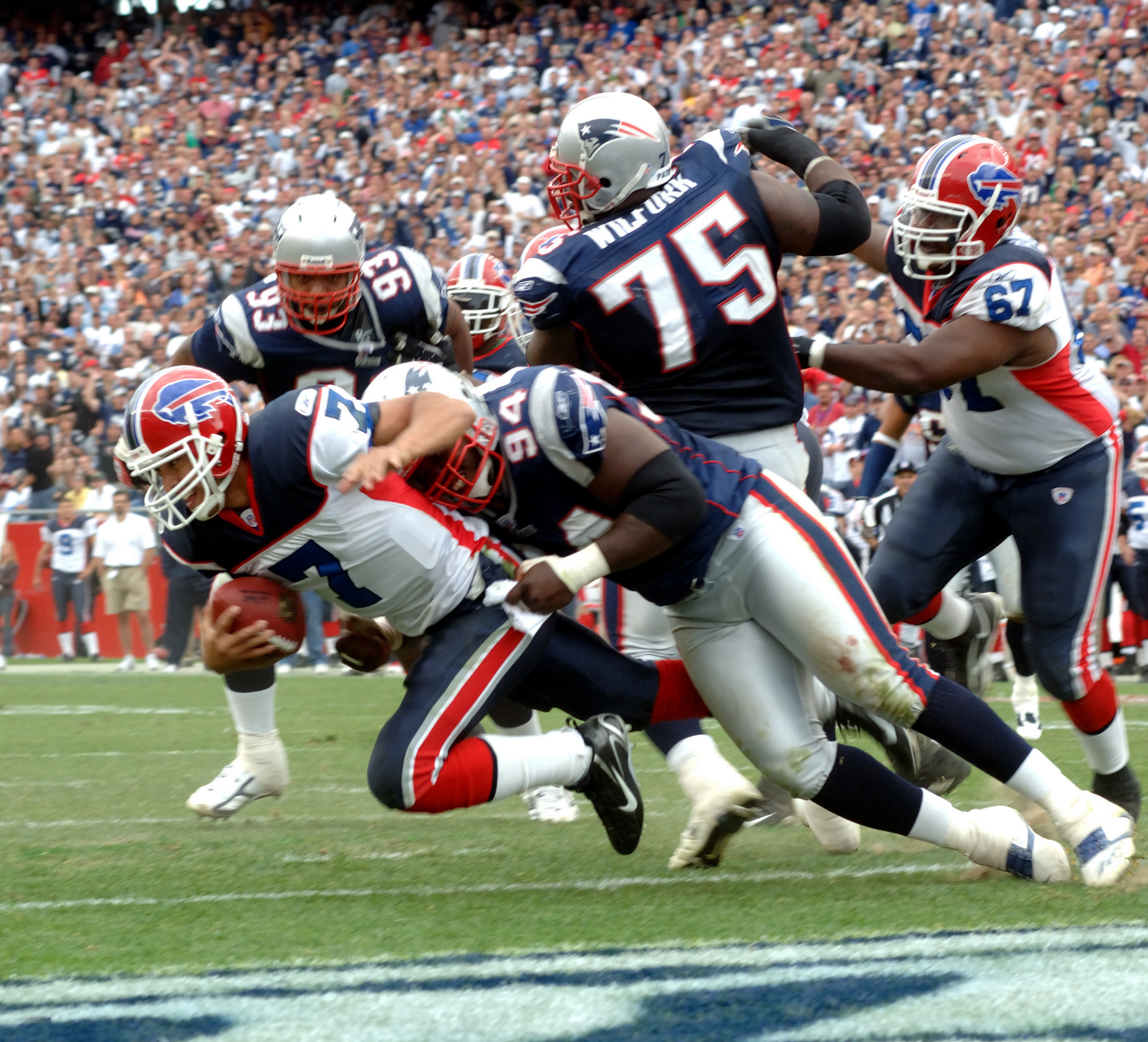
Bills QB J. P. Losman gets tackled in the endzone by Ty Warren for a safety

The Patriots opened the regular season at home against the Buffalo Bills. On the very first play of the game, quarterback Tom Brady was sacked by Bills linebacker Takeo Spikes, causing a fumble, which was recovered and returned as a five-yard touchdown to put the Bills ahead to an early lead.

New England would tie the game with a nine-yard Brady touchdown pass to wide receiver Troy Brown, but the Bills re-took the lead a 53-yard field goal by Bills kicker Rian Lindell and an 18-yard touchdown run from running back Anthony Thomas. Despite their first half struggles, the Patriots would win after a 17-yard pass to running back Kevin Faulk, a 32-yard field goal by rookie kicker Stephen Gostkowski, and a safety by defensive end Ty Warren on quarterback J. P. Losman to secure a 19–17 Patriots victory. The win was the 100th of Bill Belichick's career.

=== Week 2: at New York Jets ===
| Quarter | 1 | 2 | 3 | 4 | Total |
|---|---|---|---|---|---|
| Patriots | 7 | 10 | 7 | 0 | 24 |
| Jets | 0 | 0 | 14 | 3 | 17 |

at Giants Stadium, East Rutherford, New Jersey

- Game time: 4:15 pm EDT
- Game weather: 84 °F (29 °C), sunny
- Game attendance: 77,595
- Referee: Scott Green
- TV announcers (CBS): Dick Enberg (play-by-play) and Randy Cross (color commentator)

The Patriots traveled to "The Meadowlands" for an AFC East matchup with the New York Jets, as head coach Bill Belichick would go up against his former assistant coach in first-year Jets head coach Eric Mangini. The Patriots outscored the Jets 17–0 in the first half, beginning with a one-yard Corey Dillon touchdown run in the first quarter. In the second quarter, the Pats increased their lead with a Gostkowski field goal and a 13-yard touchdown catch by rookie wide receiver Chad Jackson. In the third quarter, the Patriots continued on their lead, with running back Laurence Maroney getting a one-yard touchdown run. However, their lead would start to diminish, as the Jets rebounded with 14 points on a 71-yard touchdown reception by wide receiver Jerricho Cotchery and a 46-yard touchdown pass to wide receiver Laveranues Coles. The Patriots were able to hold the Jets to a field goal in the fourth quarter, preserving a seven-point lead and their second win of the season. With the win, the Patriots' franchise record climbed above .500 for the first time since the 1968 season.

=== Week 3: vs. Denver Broncos ===
| Quarter | 1 | 2 | 3 | 4 | Total |
|---|---|---|---|---|---|
| Broncos | 0 | 10 | 0 | 7 | 17 |
| Patriots | 0 | 0 | 0 | 7 | 7 |

at Gillette Stadium, Foxborough, Massachusetts

- Game time: 8:15 pm EDT
- Game weather: 68 °F (20 °C), mostly cloudy
- Game attendance: 68,756
- Referee: Gerry Austin
- TV announcers (NBC): Al Michaels (play-by-play), John Madden (color commentator), and Andrea Kremer (sideline reporter)

The Patriots returned home for a Week 3 Sunday night game with the Denver Broncos, who eliminated the Patriots from the playoffs in 2005. Both sides prevented each other from striking up a single point in the first quarter, but in the second quarter, the Patriots fell behind early with kicker Jason Elam kicking a 23-yard field goal and wide receiver Javon Walker catching a 32-yard touchdown pass. After a scoreless third quarter, the Broncos increased their lead to 17 after another Walker touchdown reception. New England would counter with a score of their own, as Brady threw an eight-yard touchdown pass to wide receiver Doug Gabriel, the Patriots' only points of a 17–7 loss.

=== Week 4: at Cincinnati Bengals ===
| Quarter | 1 | 2 | 3 | 4 | Total |
|---|---|---|---|---|---|
| Patriots | 0 | 14 | 7 | 17 | 38 |
| Bengals | 6 | 0 | 7 | 0 | 13 |

at Paul Brown Stadium, Cincinnati, Ohio

- Game time: 4:15 pm EDT
- Game weather: 75 °F (24 °C), sunny
- Game attendance: 66,035
- Referee: Bill Vinovich
- TV announcers (CBS): Jim Nantz (play-by-play) and Phil Simms (color commentator)

Hoping to preserve their division lead, the Patriots flew to Paul Brown Stadium for a Week 4 showdown with the Cincinnati Bengals. In the first quarter, the Bengals opened the scoring with two Shayne Graham field goals. The Patriots would get on the board in the second quarter, as Maroney ran in for an 11-yard touchdown and Brady completed a 25-yard touchdown pass to Gabriel. Down by eight in the third quarter, running back Rudi Johnson ran two yards for a touchdown, the final Cincinnati points of the game. The Patriots took their one-point lead and turned it into a 25-point win, starting with a Maroney 25-yard touchdown run. In the fourth quarter, Gostkowski kicked a 24-yard field goal, Dillon scored from one yard out on a run, and Brady completed a three-yard touchdown pass to tight end Daniel Graham. With their victory, the Patriots advanced to 3–1 and maintained their lead in the AFC East.

=== Week 5: vs. Miami Dolphins ===
| Quarter | 1 | 2 | 3 | 4 | Total |
|---|---|---|---|---|---|
| Dolphins | 0 | 10 | 0 | 0 | 10 |
| Patriots | 3 | 10 | 0 | 7 | 20 |

at Gillette Stadium, Foxborough, Massachusetts

- Game time: 1:00 pm EDT
- Game weather: 65 °F (18 °C), sunny
- Game attendance: 68,756
- Referee: Ed Hochuli
- TV announcers (CBS): Greg Gumbel (play-by-play) and Dan Dierdorf (color commentator)

Following a road victory over Cincinnati, the Patriots went back home for Week 5, as they faced the Miami Dolphins. In the first quarter, Gostkowski kicked a 35-yard field goal for the only score of the period. In the second quarter, New England continued to build on their lead, as Gostkowski kicked a 31-yard field goal, while Brady completed a 10-yard touchdown pass to Troy Brown. The Dolphins responded with a two-yard touchdown run by running back Ronnie Brown and a 40-yard field goal by Olindo Mare as the first half came to a close. After a scoreless third quarter, the Patriots secured their victory with the only points of the second half, a one-yard touchdown pass to Kevin Faulk. With the win, the Patriots advanced 4–1.

=== Week 7: at Buffalo Bills ===
| Quarter | 1 | 2 | 3 | 4 | Total |
|---|---|---|---|---|---|
| Patriots | 14 | 0 | 7 | 7 | 28 |
| Bills | 3 | 0 | 0 | 3 | 6 |

at Ralph Wilson Stadium, Orchard Park, New York

- Game time: 1:00 pm EDT
- Game weather: 50 °F (10 °C), cloudy
- Game attendance: 72,180
- Referee: Jeff Triplette
- TV announcers (CBS): Greg Gumbel (play-by-play) and Dan Dierdorf (color commentator)

Coming off their bye week, the Patriots flew to Ralph Wilson Stadium for a rematch with their AFC East rival, the Buffalo Bills. Dillon got the Patriots off to an early start with an eight-yard touchdown run. Even though Bills' Rian Lindell got Buffalo on the board with a 40-yard field goal, Dillon again helped the Patriots increase their lead with a 12-yard touchdown run. After a scoreless second quarter, Brady hooked up with Jackson on a 35-yard touchdown pass for the only score of the period. In the fourth quarter, Lindell would add a 46-yard field goal, but Brady put the game away with a five-yard touchdown pass to Gabriel, giving New England the season sweep over Buffalo and a 5–1 record.

=== Week 8: at Minnesota Vikings ===
| Quarter | 1 | 2 | 3 | 4 | Total |
|---|---|---|---|---|---|
| Patriots | 7 | 10 | 14 | 0 | 31 |
| Vikings | 0 | 0 | 7 | 0 | 7 |

at the Hubert H. Humphrey Metrodome, Minneapolis, Minnesota

- Game time: 8:30 pm EST/7:30 pm CST
- Game weather: Played indoors, domed stadium
- Game attendance: 63,819
- Referee: Larry Nemmers
- TV announcers (ESPN^{[a]}): Mike Tirico (play-by-play), Joe Theismann and Tony Kornheiser (color commentators), Michele Tafoya and Suzy Kolber (sideline reporters)

The Patriots travelled to the Metrodome for a Monday Night Football showdown with the Minnesota Vikings, who, like the Patriots, boasted an excellent run defense. The Patriots, who took to the air with a spread offense for the entire game, opened with a seven-play, 86-yard strike that ended with a touchdown pass from Brady to wide receiver Reche Caldwell. Their next drive was for 93 yards which resulted in a 23-yard Gostkowski field goal. And just before halftime the Patriots moved 74 yards in 11 plays to take a 17–0 lead on a nine-yard scoring toss to tight end Benjamin Watson. The only Vikings score of the game came on a 71-yard punt return by Mewelde Moore in the third quarter; Laurence Maroney immediately answered on the ensuing kickoff, with a 77-yard return to Minnesota's 21-yard line, his second return of over 70 yards in as many weeks. The Patriots' lead grew to 17 after a seven-yard touchdown reception by Brown with 9:03 in the third quarter and then became 31–7 with a touchdown catch by Jackson. The Patriots defense also intercepted four passes from quarterbacks Brad Johnson and Brooks Bollinger. On Bollinger's first drive after relieving Brad Johnson he was sacked three times in a row for a net loss of 23 yards. With their fourth straight victory, the Patriots advanced to 6–1. This was the Patriots' third and final game played in the Metrodome.

=== Week 9: vs. Indianapolis Colts ===
| Quarter | 1 | 2 | 3 | 4 | Total |
|---|---|---|---|---|---|
| Colts | 7 | 10 | 7 | 3 | 27 |
| Patriots | 0 | 14 | 3 | 3 | 20 |

at Gillette Stadium, Foxborough, Massachusetts

- Game time: 8:15 pm EST
- Game weather: 31 °F (−1 °C), clear
- Game attendance: 68,756
- Referee: Ron Winter
- TV announcers (NBC): Al Michaels (play-by-play), John Madden (color commentator), and Andrea Kremer (sideline reporter)

Riding high from their Monday Night win over the Vikings, the Patriots returned home for a highly anticipated Sunday Night matchup with the Indianapolis Colts. In the first quarter, the Colts drew first blood as quarterback Peyton Manning completed a five-yard touchdown pass to wide receiver Marvin Harrison for the only score of the quarter. In the second quarter, Dillon helped the Patriots respond with a one-yard touchdown run. Indianapolis would re-take the lead on a one-yard touchdown run by rookie running back Joseph Addai. Dillon again tied the game, this time on a four-yard touchdown run. Colts kicker Adam Vinatieri then nailed a 23-yard field goal to give the Colts a lead they would not relinquish. In the third quarter, the duo of Manning and Harrison struck again with a four-yard touchdown strike. The Patriots responded with a 49-yard field goal, Gostkowski's career longest to date. In the fourth quarter, Vinatieri kicked a 31-yard field goal to make the score 27–17. On the Patriots next possession they drove down the field but ended up going 3-and-out in the red zone and settled for a 26-yard Gostkowski field goal. On the Colts' ensuing drive, a drive set up a Vinatieri field goal attempt but the former Patriots kicker missed this one to give his former team a chance to tie it up and send the game into overtime. However, the Patriots comeback attempt was thwarted when a Brady pass deflected off the hands of Faulk and was intercepted by Cato June. With the loss, the Patriots dropped to 6–2. As part of his 5-catch effort in the game, Troy Brown became the Patriots' all-time leader in receptions. (Stanley Morgan, 534)

This would be the last time Brady lost at home to a team from another AFC division during the regular season until Week 1 of the 2017 season.

=== Week 10: vs. New York Jets ===
| Quarter | 1 | 2 | 3 | 4 | Total |
|---|---|---|---|---|---|
| Jets | 0 | 7 | 3 | 7 | 17 |
| Patriots | 0 | 6 | 0 | 8 | 14 |

at Gillette Stadium, Foxborough, Massachusetts

- Game time: 1:00 pm EST
- Game weather: 58 °F (14 °C), rain
- Game attendance: 68,756
- Referee: Pete Morelli
- TV announcers (CBS): Jim Nantz (play-by-play) and Phil Simms (color commentator)

Trying to rebound from their home loss to the Colts, the Patriots stayed at home for a rainy AFC East rematch with the Jets. After a scoreless first quarter, the Patriots struck first with a Gostkowski 31-yard field goal. However, the Jets would fire back with running back Kevan Barlow getting a touchdown on a two-yard run. Gostkowski would get one more field goal for New England, in the form of a 21-yarder. In the third quarter, New York kicker Mike Nugent kicked a 34-yard field goal for the only score of the period. In the fourth quarter, the Jets continued their pursuit, as Pennington completed a 22-yard touchdown pass to Cotchery. The Patriots tried to fight back, as Brady completed a 15-yard touchdown pass to Caldwell, following it up with a successful two-point conversion pass to Caldwell. However, New York's defense managed to bottle up any chance of a New England comeback. With the loss, the Patriots would lead the Jets by one game in the AFC East at 6–3. Also with the loss, the Patriots' 57-game streak without consecutive losses, which dated back to the 2002 season, was snapped. The San Francisco 49ers still hold the record of 60-straight games without consecutive losses (1995 – 1999). For Tom Brady, this would be his last regular-season loss at home until Week 9 of the 2011 season.

This turned out to be the last time Brady lost at home to another AFC team during the regular season until Week 17 of the 2014 season.

==== FieldTurf installation ====
After the game was played on a completely sodden, torn-up natural grass field, the Patriots used the two-week interval before the next home game to install a new "FieldTurf" surface at Gillette Stadium.

=== Week 11: at Green Bay Packers ===
| Quarter | 1 | 2 | 3 | 4 | Total |
|---|---|---|---|---|---|
| Patriots | 7 | 14 | 7 | 7 | 35 |
| Packers | 0 | 0 | 0 | 0 | 0 |

at Lambeau Field, Green Bay, Wisconsin

- Game time: 1:00 pm EST/12:00 pm CST
- Game weather: 41 °F (5 °C), mostly sunny
- Game attendance: 70,753
- Referee: Mike Carey
- TV announcers (CBS): Greg Gumbel (play-by-play) and Dan Dierdorf (color commentator)

Trying to rebound from back-to-back home losses, the Patriots traveled to Lambeau Field for a Week 11 showdown with the Green Bay Packers. In the first quarter, Brady hooked up with Graham on a two-yard touchdown pass for the only score of the period. In the second quarter, Dillon got a one-yard touchdown run, while Brady hooked up with Caldwell on a 54-yard touchdown pass. Late in the quarter Packers quarterback Brett Favre was sacked by Tedy Bruschi and was knocked out of the game with injury to his right (throwing) wrist. In the third quarter, Brady threw an eight-yard touchdown pass to Watson for the only score of the period. In the fourth quarter, New England put the game away with Brady throwing his fourth touchdown pass of the day to Maroney, a 19-yard strike. With the win, the Patriots improved to 7–3.

=== Week 12: vs. Chicago Bears ===
| Quarter | 1 | 2 | 3 | 4 | Total |
|---|---|---|---|---|---|
| Bears | 0 | 3 | 0 | 10 | 13 |
| Patriots | 0 | 10 | 0 | 7 | 17 |

at Gillette Stadium, Foxborough, Massachusetts

- Game time: 4:15 pm EST
- Game weather: 54 °F (12 °C), cloudy
- Game attendance: 68,756
- Referee: Walt Coleman
- TV announcers (Fox): Joe Buck (play-by-play), Troy Aikman (color commentator), and Pam Oliver (sideline reporter)

After blanking the Packers in the previous week, the Patriots prepared to take on the team with the number one overall defense in the NFL: the Chicago Bears. This game marked the first game the Patriots played on the new FieldTurf at Gillette Stadium. Turnovers dominated the entire game as both teams turned the ball over a total of nine times; in the first half alone Benjamin Watson caught a Tom Brady pass at the Bears' 1-yard line but was hammered and the ball popped into the Bears' hands; later Laurence Maroney was stripped of the ball in the Bears redzone; the Bears for their part surrendered a Rex Grossman interception by Asante Samuel and a Grossman fumble in the Pats' redzone. The Patriots scored first with a one-yard Maroney run in the second quarter. The Bears responded with a field goal with 4:04 remaining. The half ended with Gostkowski making his longest field goal of the season and his career with a 52-yarder to make the score 10–3. In the second half, running back Cedric Benson scored the Bears' next touchdown with a two-yard run with 14:53 remaining in the game. The touchdown came after a defensive pass interference penalty call that resulted in a 45-yard gain for the Bears. The Patriots responded by marching down field and scoring on a Brady touchdown pass to Watson to make the score 17–10; this drive was highlighted by a nine-yard first-down run by Brady in which he faked out Bears linebacker Brian Urlacher. After another defensive pass interference penalty that gave the Bears 1st and 10 at the New England 18-yard line, the Patriots second-ranked defense stopped the Bears. limiting them to a field goal, putting the score at 17–13 with 3:31 left. The game closed on a Dillon fumble which gave the Bears one final chance to drive down field, but quarterback Rex Grossman threw his third interception of the night to cornerback Asante Samuel. The Patriots then knelt down to end the game and improve their record to 9–3. The three interceptions by Samuel were the most interceptions by one player in one game since Roland James in 1983. As part of his 6-catch effort, Kevin Faulk eclipsed the Patriots' franchise running back reception record. (Tony Collins, 261) Also with the win, Tom Brady became the Patriots' all-time winningest quarterback. (Steve Grogan, 75 wins)

=== Week 13: vs. Detroit Lions ===
| Quarter | 1 | 2 | 3 | 4 | Total |
|---|---|---|---|---|---|
| Lions | 0 | 10 | 8 | 3 | 21 |
| Patriots | 3 | 10 | 0 | 15 | 28 |

at Gillette Stadium, Foxborough, Massachusetts

- Game time: 1:00 pm EST
- Game weather: 44 °F (7 °C), sunny
- Game attendance: 68,756
- Referee: Jeff Triplette
- TV announcers (Fox): Matt Vasgersian (play-by-play) and J.C. Pearson (color commentator)

Dillon turned out to be the savior of a turnover-filled game as the Patriots were able to rally from an eight-point deficit to defeat the visiting Detroit Lions, 28–21. The Patriots committed a season-high ten penalties throughout the game and turned the ball over four times as they struggled to defeat a team which was able to move the ball at will and were also able to convert a safety. The first quarter was a back and forth fight with the Patriots gaining the only edge on a Gostkowski field goal. The second quarter saw both offenses gaining momentum with the Lions scoring the first touchdown in the game on a five-yard Jon Kitna pass to Mike Furrey with 13:44 remaining. The Lions then expanded their lead with a field goal by Jason Hanson to lead 10–3. The Patriots responded by driving down the field and scoring on a six-yard Dillon run to tie the game 10–10. On the Lions' ensuing possession Kitna threw the first of his three interceptions for the afternoon to Samuel. The Patriots then marched down the field and the first half ended on a 27-yard Gostkowski field goal. The second half started with the Lions slowly moving the ball down the field for a field goal to even up the score again 13–13. Brady then threw an interception to Dré Bly, which gave the ball back to the Lions. The Lions again were unable to get into the endzone and settled on another field goal for a 16–13 lead. On the following possession, Heath Evans got tackled by Jared DeVries which was called as a safety, giving the Lions an 18–13 lead and possession. The Lions once more could not score a touchdown and took another field goal to take a 21–13 lead. The Patriots were not deterred, though, as on the next drive they were able to get Dillon into the endzone again and complete the two-point conversion with a pass from Brady to Brown. With this touchdown, Dillon became only the 15th NFL player with more than 11,000 career rushing yards. Following the kickoff came an onslaught of turnovers. First Kitna threw an interception to Mike Vrabel to give the Patriots the ball and a chance for the lead, but Watson fumbled the ball after a reception which gave the ball back to the Lions. Kitna then was sacked and fumbled which gave the ball once again back to the Patriots. This turned out to be the definitive scoring drive as Dillon scored his third touchdown of the night, putting the Patriots ahead 28–21. On the final drive for the Lions, Kitna again threw an interception to Vrabel, who suffered a minor injury on the play. The Patriots then ended with three kneel downs and came out victorious 28–21 and improving to 9–3 for the season. With this victory the Patriots also swept the entire NFC North.

=== Week 14: at Miami Dolphins ===
| Quarter | 1 | 2 | 3 | 4 | Total |
|---|---|---|---|---|---|
| Patriots | 0 | 0 | 0 | 0 | 0 |
| Dolphins | 3 | 3 | 7 | 8 | 21 |

at Dolphin Stadium, Miami Gardens, Florida

- Game time: 1:00 pm EST
- Game weather: 77 °F (25 °C), sunny
- Game attendance: 74,033
- Referee: Larry Nemmers
- TV announcers (CBS): Dick Enberg (play-by-play) and Randy Cross (color commentator)

On a day when a victory would give the Patriots their third consecutive AFC East title, nothing seemed to go right for the Patriots as the Dolphins outplayed the Patriots to split the season series and give New England their first shutout since 2003, defeating the Patriots 21–0. The first half was a defensive struggle with the only points coming from Olindo Mare, in the form of a 35-yard and a 33-yard field goal. Even the punter, Donnie Jones, gave the Patriots issues as multiple punts resulted in the offensive unit starting within the five-yard line. The furthest the Patriots drove into Dolphin territory was in the third quarter with the Dolphins leading 13–0. Ending with a would-be touchdown reception by Watson, a play consisting of a lateral from Faulk to Brady was ruled penalty, as Faulk's lateral was an illegal forward pass. On the following possession, Matt Cassel took over the offense, but he too succumbed to the Dolphin defense and was sacked, fumbling the ball. The Dolphins marched within the New England 10-yard line again but knelt to burn out the clock. The loss gave the Patriots a 4–2 division record and 9–4 record overall. This would be the Patriots' last shutout loss until their 2016 Super Bowl-winning season, 10 years later. This would be the team's final regular season loss until Week 3 of the 2008 season, their last regular-season road loss until Week 6 of the 2008 season, and Brady's last regular-season loss until Week 2 of the 2009 season.

=== Week 15: vs. Houston Texans ===
| Quarter | 1 | 2 | 3 | 4 | Total |
|---|---|---|---|---|---|
| Texans | 0 | 0 | 7 | 0 | 7 |
| Patriots | 17 | 10 | 7 | 6 | 40 |

at Gillette Stadium, Foxborough, Massachusetts

- Game time: 1:00 pm EST
- Game weather: 52 °F (11 °C), cloudy
- Game attendance: 68,756
- Referee: Scott Green
- TV announcers (CBS): Kevin Harlan (play-by-play) and Rich Gannon (color commentator)

After a road loss to the Dolphins, the Patriots returned home for a Week 15 matchup with the Houston Texans. In the first quarter, New England started off strong with Faulk scoring on an 11-yard touchdown run. Afterwards, Gostkowski nailed a 36-yard field goal, while Brady completed a 43-yard touchdown pass to Faulk. In the second quarter, the Patriots' domination of the game continued with Gostkowski kicking a 32-yard field goal, while Brady completed a six-yard touchdown pass to wide receiver Jabar Gaffney. In the third quarter, the Texans finally managed to get a touchdown with running back Ron Dayne getting in on a one-yard run. The Patriots responded with cornerback Ellis Hobbs returning a kickoff 93 yards for a touchdown. In the fourth quarter, New England wrapped up the game with Gostkowski kicking 31-yard and 21-yard field goals. With the win, the Patriots improved to 10–4.

=== Week 16: at Jacksonville Jaguars ===
| Quarter | 1 | 2 | 3 | 4 | Total |
|---|---|---|---|---|---|
| Patriots | 0 | 10 | 7 | 7 | 24 |
| Jaguars | 0 | 7 | 7 | 7 | 21 |

at Alltel Stadium, Jacksonville, Florida

- Game time: 1:00 pm EST
- Game weather: 65 °F (18 °C), cloudy
- Game attendance: 67,164
- Referee: Walt Anderson
- TV announcers (CBS): Greg Gumbel (play-by-play) and Dan Dierdorf (color commentator)

The Patriots clinched their fourth straight AFC East title with a close road win. After a scoreless first quarter, the Jaguars responded to a Gostkowski field goal with a Maurice Jones-Drew touchdown run. The Patriots challenged the play, as Jones-Drew appeared to fall down at the line of scrimmage, but the ruling on the field was upheld. New England came back before the halftime to retake the lead at 10–7 on a Dillon one-yard touchdown run. The Patriots maintained their lead as the teams traded touchdowns in the second half, including another touchdown by Jones-Drew. A David Garrard fumble with 1:55 left in the fourth quarter, recovered by safety Rodney Harrison, sealed the Patriots' 11th win of the season.

=== Week 17: at Tennessee Titans ===
| Quarter | 1 | 2 | 3 | 4 | Total |
|---|---|---|---|---|---|
| Patriots | 9 | 10 | 7 | 14 | 40 |
| Titans | 3 | 7 | 13 | 0 | 23 |

at LP Field, Nashville, Tennessee

- Game time: 1:00 pm EST/12:00 pm CST
- Game weather: 63 °F (17 °C), rain
- Game attendance: 69,143
- Referee: Ed Hochuli
- TV announcers (CBS): Dick Enberg (play-by-play) and Randy Cross (color commentator)

The Titans had a slim shot of making the playoffs if the Bengals and Broncos lost and they could beat the Patriots, adding importance to the game for the Titans. Having already clinched a playoff berth, the Patriots used their full complement of available players, made evident by touchdowns from all three Patriots quarterbacks: Brady, Cassel, and Vinny Testaverde all threw touchdown passes in this game. With his fourth-quarter touchdown pass, Testaverde extended his steak of seasons with a touchdown pass to 20. After trading field goals in the first quarter, Dillon gave the Patriots a seven-point lead on a 21-yard touchdown run. After another 10 points from the Patriots, the Titans closed the half with an 81-yard punt return by Pacman Jones for a touchdown. The second half saw three touchdowns before Testaverde's, a 62-yard reception by Caldwell, a 28-yard run by Vince Young, and a one-yard touchdown run by Maroney. The game proved costly for the Pats as Rodney Harrison was knocked out of the game and the playoffs in the second quarter.

== Standings ==
AFC East
| | W | L | T | PCT | DIV | CONF | PF | PA | STK |
|---|---|---|---|---|---|---|---|---|---|
| ^{(4)} New England Patriots | 12 | 4 | 0 | .750 | 4–2 | 8–4 | 385 | 237 | W3 |
| ^{(5)} New York Jets | 10 | 6 | 0 | .625 | 4–2 | 7–5 | 316 | 295 | W3 |
| Buffalo Bills | 7 | 9 | 0 | .438 | 3–3 | 5–7 | 300 | 311 | L2 |
| Miami Dolphins | 6 | 10 | 0 | .375 | 1–5 | 3–9 | 260 | 283 | L3 |

=== Standings breakdown ===
| | W | L | T | Pct. | PF | PA |
| Home | 5 | 3 | 0 | .625 | 165 | 129 |
| Away | 7 | 1 | 0 | .875 | 220 | 108 |
| AFC East Opponents | 4 | 2 | 0 | .667 | 105 | 88 |
| AFC Opponents | 8 | 4 | 0 | .636 | 274 | 196 |
| NFC Opponents | 4 | 0 | 0 | 1.000 | 111 | 41 |
By Stadium Type
| Indoors | 1 | 0 | 0 | 1.000 | 31 | 7 |
| Outdoors | 11 | 4 | 0 | .733 | 354 | 230 |

== Postseason schedule ==
| Week | Kickoff | Date | Opponent | Result | Record | Game Site | TV | NFL.com Recap |
|---|---|---|---|---|---|---|---|---|
| Wild Card | 1:00 pm EST | January 7, 2007 | New York Jets (5) | W 37–16 | 1–0 | Gillette Stadium | CBS | Recap |
| Divisional | 4:30 pm EST | January 14, 2007 | at San Diego Chargers (1) | W 24–21 | 2–0 | Qualcomm Stadium | CBS | Recap |
| AFC Championship | 6:30 pm EST | January 21, 2007 | at Indianapolis Colts (3) | L 34–38 | 2–1 | RCA Dome | CBS | Recap |

== Postseason results ==
=== Wild Card Round vs. New York Jets ===
| Quarter | 1 | 2 | 3 | 4 | Total |
|---|---|---|---|---|---|
| Jets | 3 | 7 | 3 | 3 | 16 |
| Patriots | 7 | 10 | 6 | 14 | 37 |

at Gillette Stadium, Foxborough, Massachusetts

- Game time: 1:00 pm EST
- Game weather: 50 °F (10 °C), sunny
- Game attendance: 68,756
- Referee: Bill Vinovich
- TV announcers (CBS): Jim Nantz (play-by-play) and Phil Simms (color commentator)

Tom Brady completed 22 out of 34 passes for 212 yards and two touchdowns, while New England Patriots running backs Corey Dillon, Laurence Maroney, and Kevin Faulk combined for 145 rushing yards in a win over the New York Jets. Receiver Jabar Gaffney, who caught only 11 passes during the season, finished his first career playoff game with 8 catches for 104 yards.

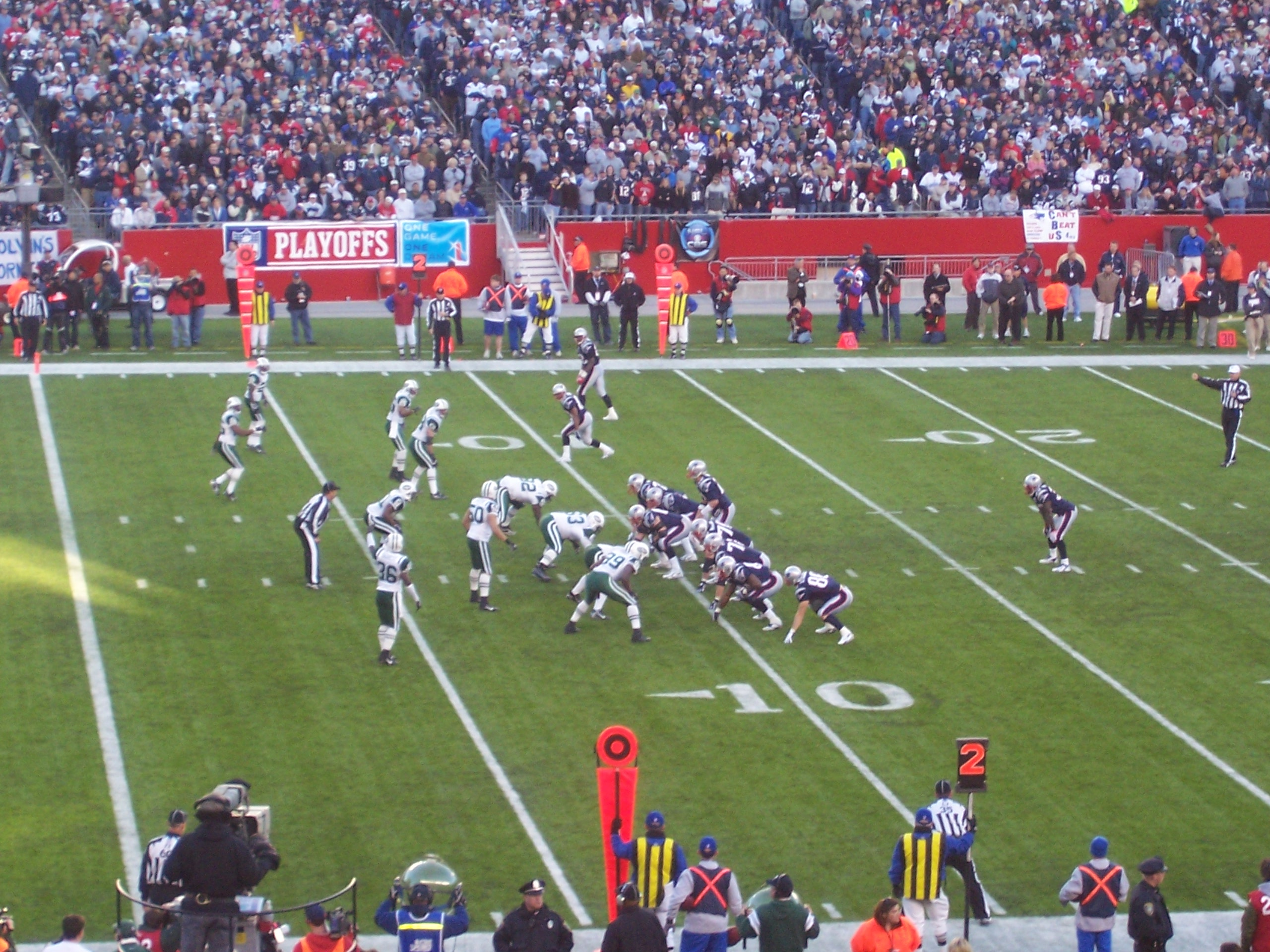
The Patriots' offense on the field

New England took the opening kickoff and drove down the field, with Gaffney catching three passes for 34 yards on a 65 yard-drive that ended with Dillon's 11-yard touchdown run. Later in the quarter, Jets defensive back Hank Poteat recovered a fumble from Dillon on the Patriots 15-yard line, setting up Mike Nugent's 28-yard field goal to cut their deficit to 7–3. On their first possession of the second quarter, the Jets took a 10–7 lead after receiver Jerricho Cotchery (who finished with 100 receiving yards and 19 rushing yards) caught a pass from Chad Pennington and took it 77 yards for a touchdown. However, New England countered with Stephen Gostkowski's 20-yard field goal on their next drive to tie the game. Then, after forcing the Jets to punt, the Patriots marched to New York's 1-yard line. On third down with 11 seconds remaining in the half and no timeouts left, Brady took the snap, faked a handoff to Dillon, and then hit tight end Daniel Graham in the back of the end zone for a touchdown to give them a 17–10 halftime lead.

Nugent kicked a field goal on the Jets' opening drive of the second half, but New England responded with another field goal from Gostkowski to retake their 7-point lead. On the Jets' ensuing possession, linebacker Rosevelt Colvin deflected a lateral from Pennington behind the line of scrimmage. Most of the players on both teams (including Colvin) thought the lateral was an incomplete forward pass and the play was over, but New England's Vince Wilfork realized the play was still ongoing and recovered the fumble. After picking up the ball, Wilfork ran 31 yards to the Jets 15-yard line before being tackled by Cotchery, setting up Gostkowski's third field goal to make the score 23–13.

Early in the fourth quarter, Nugent kicked his third field goal to cut New York's deficit back to within a touchdown, 23–16. However, the Patriots responded with a 13-play, 63-yard drive that took 6:23 off the clock and ended with Brady's 7-yard touchdown pass to Faulk. Then on the first play of the Jets' ensuing drive, New England defensive back Asante Samuel put the game away by intercepting Pennington's pass and returning it 36 yards for a touchdown. This would be the Patriots last Wild-Card win until 2025.

- Scoring

First quarter

- NE – Corey Dillon 11-yard run (Stephen Gostkowski kick), 11:53. Patriots 7–0. Drive: 10 plays, 65 yards, 3:07.
- NYJ – Mike Nugent 28-yard field goal, 2:36. Patriots 7–3. Drive: 4 plays, 5 yards, 1:30.

Second quarter

- NYJ – Jerricho Cotchery 77-yard pass from Chad Pennington (Mike Nugent kick), 14:45. Jets 10–7. Drive: 3 plays, 80 yards, 0:17.
- NE – Stephen Gostkowski 20-yard field goal, 10:57. Tied 10–10. Drive: 10 plays, 56 yards, 3:48.
- NE – Daniel Graham 1-yard pass from Tom Brady (Stephen Gostkowski kick), 0:11. Patriots 17–10. Drive: 15 plays, 80 yards, 6:54.

Third quarter

- NYJ – Mike Nugent 21-yard field goal, 8:19. Patriots 17–13. Drive: 13 plays, 73 yards, 6:41.
- NE – Stephen Gostkowski 40-yard field goal, 4:22. Patriots 20–13. Drive: 8 plays, 52 yards, 3:57.
- NE – Stephen Gostkowski 28-yard field goal, 0:04. Patriots 23–13. Drive: 4 plays, 5 yards, 1:39.

Fourth quarter

- NYJ – Mike Nugent 37-yard field goal, 11:39. Patriots 23–16. Drive: 8 plays, 61 yards, 3:25.
- NE – Kevin Faulk 7-yard pass from Tom Brady (Stephen Gostkowski kick), 5:16. Patriots 30–16. Drive: 13 plays, 63 yards, 6:23.
- NE – Asante Samuel 36-yard interception return (Stephen Gostkowski kick), 4:54. Patriots 37–16.

=== Divisional Round at San Diego Chargers ===
| Quarter | 1 | 2 | 3 | 4 | Total |
|---|---|---|---|---|---|
| Patriots | 3 | 7 | 3 | 11 | 24 |
| Chargers | 0 | 14 | 0 | 7 | 21 |

at Qualcomm Stadium, San Diego, California

- Game time: 4:30 pm EST/1:30 pm PST
- Game weather: 53 °F (12 °C), sunny
- Game attendance: 68,810
- Referee: Tony Corrente
- TV announcers (CBS): Jim Nantz (play-by-play) and Phil Simms (color commentator)

In the final game of the divisional playoffs, the New England Patriots faced the San Diego Chargers team, who were unbeaten at home in the regular season. The Chargers' roster included league MVP running back LaDainian Tomlinson, who broke several league records, nine Pro Bowlers, and five All-Pro players. However, four Chargers turnovers, three of which were converted into Patriots scoring drives, helped lead to a Chargers loss. San Diego lost despite outgaining the Patriots in rushing yards, 148–51 and total yards, 352–327, while also intercepting three passes from Tom Brady.

In the first quarter, after San Diego coach Marty Schottenheimer opted to go for it on 4th-and-11 instead of attempting a 47-yard field goal, quarterback Philip Rivers lost a fumble while being sacked by Mike Vrabel, setting up Stephen Gostkowski's 51-yard field goal with 40 seconds left in the period. In the second quarter, Chargers receiver Eric Parker's 13-yard punt return set up a 48-yard scoring drive that ended with LaDainian Tomlinson's 2-yard touchdown run, giving his team a 7–3 lead. Then, on the Patriots' next drive, linebacker Donnie Edwards intercepted a pass from Brady and returned it to the 41-yard line. But the Chargers ended up punting after Rivers was sacked on third down by defensive back Artrell Hawkins. Later in the quarter, Tomlinson rushed twice for 13 yards and took a screen pass 58 yards to the Patriots' 6-yard line, setting up a 6-yard touchdown run by Michael Turner with 2:04 left in the half. New England responded with a 72-yard scoring drive, with receiver Jabar Gaffney catching four passes for 46 yards, including a 7-yard touchdown reception with six seconds left in the half, cutting their deficit to 14–10.

In the second half, Brady threw his second interception of the game. But once again, the Chargers were forced to punt after Rivers was sacked on third down. Mike Scifres' 36-yard punt pinned New England back at their own 2-yard line, and San Diego subsequently forced a punt, but Parker muffed the kick and New England's David Thomas recovered the fumble at the Chargers' 31-yard line. New England's drive seemed to stall after Brady fumbled on 3rd and 13. Patriots' tackle Matt Light recovered it and Chargers defensive back Drayton Florence drew a 15-yard unsportsmanlike conduct penalty for taunting Patriots tight end Daniel Graham. The drive continued and Gostkowski eventually kicked a 34-yard field goal to cut their deficit to 14–13. Then, on San Diego's next drive, linebacker Rosevelt Colvin intercepted a pass from Rivers at the New England 36-yard line. The Patriots then drove to the Chargers 41-yard line, but were halted there and had to punt. After the punt, Rivers completed two passes to tight end Antonio Gates for 31 yards and a 31-yard pass to Vincent Jackson, setting up Tomlinson's second rushing touchdown to give the Chargers an 8-point lead, 21–13.

New England responded by driving to San Diego's 41-yard line. On a fourth-down conversion attempt, Brady's pass was intercepted by Marlon McCree, but Troy Brown stripped the ball, and receiver Reche Caldwell recovered it. Schottenheimer unsuccessfully challenged the play and lost a timeout. Four plays later, Brady threw a 4-yard touchdown pass to Caldwell. On the next play, running back Kevin Faulk took a direct snap and scored the two-point conversion, tying the game. Then, after forcing a punt, Brady completed a 19-yard pass to Daniel Graham. Two plays later, Caldwell caught a 49-yard strike down the right sideline to set up Gostkowski's third field goal to give them a 24–21 lead with only 1:10 left in the fourth quarter. With no timeouts left, San Diego drove to the Patriots 36-yard line on their final possession, but Nate Kaeding's 54-yard field goal attempt fell short with three seconds remaining in the game.

Gaffney finished with ten catches for 103 yards and a touchdown. Tomlinson rushed for 123 yards, caught two passes for 64 yards, and scored two touchdowns.

- Scoring

First quarter

- NE – Stephen Gostkowski 50-yard field goal, 0:40. Patriots 3–0. Drive: 9 plays, 33 yards, 4:35.

Second quarter

- SD – LaDainian Tomlinson 2-yard run (Nate Kaeding kick), 7:19. Chargers 7–3. Drive: 9 plays, 48 yards, 4:31.
- SD – Michael Turner 6-yard run (Nate Kaeding kick), 2:04. Chargers 14–3. Drive: 4 plays, 77 yards, 2:23.
- NE – Jabar Gaffney 6-yard pass from Tom Brady (Stephen Gostkowski kick), 0:08. Chargers 14–10. Drive: 11 plays, 72 yards, 1:56.

Third quarter

- NE – Stephen Gostkowski 34-yard field goal, 2:11. Chargers 14–13. Drive: 7 plays, 15 yards, 3:09.

Fourth quarter

- SD – LaDainian Tomlinson 3-yard run (Nate Kaeding kick), 8:35. Chargers 21–13. Drive: 9 plays, 83 yards, 4:44.
- NE – Reche Caldwell 4-yard pass from Tom Brady (Kevin Faulk run), 4:36. Tied 21–21. Drive: 5 plays, 32 yards, 1:40.
- NE – Stephen Gostkowski 31-yard field goal, 1:10. Patriots 24–21. Drive: 8 plays, 72 yards, 2:16.

=== AFC Championship Game at Indianapolis Colts ===
| Quarter | 1 | 2 | 3 | 4 | Total |
|---|---|---|---|---|---|
| Patriots | 7 | 14 | 7 | 6 | 34 |
| Colts | 3 | 3 | 15 | 17 | 38 |

at RCA Dome, Indianapolis, Indiana

- Game time: 6:30 pm EST
- Game weather: Played indoors, domed stadium
- Game attendance: 57,433
- Referee: Bill Carollo
- TV announcers (CBS): Jim Nantz (play-by-play), Phil Simms (color commentator), Steve Tasker and Solomon Wilcots (sideline reporters)

The Colts gained 455 offensive yards, 32 first downs, and managed to overcome a 21–3 deficit to the Patriots to earn their first trip to the Super Bowl since the 1970 season. Their 18-point comeback was the largest ever in an NFL conference championship game, and tied the record for the fourth largest NFL postseason comeback. The Colts' win came after the Patriots had eliminated the Colts from the playoffs twice in the previous three seasons.

Midway through the first quarter, the Patriots drove 71 yards to the Colts' 4-yard line, featuring a 35-yard run by Corey Dillon. On third down, running back Laurence Maroney fumbled a handoff, but the ball rolled into the end zone where offensive lineman Logan Mankins recovered it for a touchdown. The Colts responded by driving 56 yards and scoring with Adam Vinatieri's 42-yard field goal to cut their deficit to 7–3. On their ensuing drive, the Patriots drove to a fourth down on the Colts' 34-yard line. Rather than attempt a 52-yard field goal, New England decided to go for it and Tom Brady completed a 27-yard pass to Troy Brown. On the next play, Dillon scored on a 7-yard touchdown run. Then, two plays after the ensuing kickoff, cornerback Asante Samuel intercepted a pass from Peyton Manning and returned it 39 yards for a touchdown, giving New England a 21–3 lead. Later in the quarter, Indianapolis drove 80 yards in 15 plays, with Vinatieri finishing the drive with a 26-yard field goal, cutting the score to 21–6 with 11 seconds left in the half.

On the opening drive of the second half, the Colts marched down the field and scored with a 1-yard run by Manning. Then, after forcing a punt, a 25-yard reception by Dallas Clark and a 19-yard run by Dominic Rhodes moved the ball to the Patriots' 32-yard line. Following a controversial pass interference penalty on defensive back Ellis Hobbs in the end zone, Manning threw a 1-yard touchdown pass to defensive lineman Dan Klecko, who had lined up at the fullback position on the play. Then, receiver Marvin Harrison caught a 2-point conversion pass to tie the game at 21. The league issued a written apology to Hobbs following the game, admitting that the pass interference call should not have been called.

Hobbs returned the ensuing kickoff 80 yards to the Colts' 21-yard line. Four plays later, Brady threw a 6-yard touchdown pass to receiver Jabar Gaffney, who made a leaping catch in the back of the end zone. Although he landed out of bounds, officials ruled that he was pushed out while in the air, and the Patriots took a 28–21 lead. Rhodes started out the Colts' next drive with two receptions for 23 yards and a 9-yard run. Then, Clark caught a 23-yard pass at the 9-yard line. Three plays later, Rhodes fumbled the ball at the 1-yard line, but center Jeff Saturday recovered it in the end zone for a touchdown to tie the game.

After an exchange of punts, New England kicker Stephen Gostkowski made a 28-yard field goal to give them a three-point lead. The Colts responded with a 36-yard field goal by Vinatieri, set up by Clark's 52-yard reception, to tie the game at 31. Hobbs returned Vinatieri's kickoff 41 yards to the Patriots' 46-yard line. Then, Brady completed a 25-yard pass to tight end Daniel Graham. Indianapolis managed to halt the drive at their 25-yard line, but Gostkowski kicked a 43-yard field goal to give the Patriots a 34–31 lead with 3:49 left in the game. New England's defense subsequently forced a punt, but the Patriots ended up punting back to the Colts after running only a minute off the clock.

Manning started off the drive with three nonconsecutive completions for 58 yards, with a roughing-the-passer penalty on the third play adding another 12, moving the ball 70 yards in a span of 19 seconds and bringing up a first down at the Patriots' 11-yard line. Three plays later, Joseph Addai's 3-yard touchdown run gave the Colts their first lead of the game with only one minute remaining. Brady responded by leading his team to the Colts' 45-yard line. But cornerback Marlin Jackson intercepted Brady's next pass with 17 seconds left, ending the game, and sending the 2006 Indianapolis Colts to their third Super Bowl in team history (first as the Indianapolis Colts).

The Colts were the first No. 3 seed since the NFL expanded the playoffs in 1990 to host a conference championship game and the first overall since the Washington Redskins did so in 1987. It was also the first time since said season where a team hosted a championship game after playing a road game in the divisional round, and was also the first conference championship game in which neither team had the first round bye and had to play three rounds to get to the Super Bowl.

- Scoring

First quarter

- NE – Logan Mankins fumble recovery in end zone for touchdown (Stephen Gostkowski kick), 7:24. Patriots 7–0. Drive: 8 plays, 75 yards, 3:36.
- IND – Adam Vinatieri 42-yard field goal, 0:48. Patriots 7–3. Drive: 14 plays, 56 yards, 6:30.

Second quarter

- NE – Corey Dillon 7-yard run (Stephen Gostkowski kick), 10:18. Patriots 14–3. Drive: 11 plays, 72 yards, 5:30.
- NE – Asante Samuel 39-yard interception return (Stephen Gostkowski kick), 9:25. Patriots 21–3.
- IND – Adam Vinatieri 26-yard field goal, 0:07. Patriots 21–6. Drive: 15 plays, 80 yards, 2:59.

Third quarter

- IND – Peyton Manning 1-yard run (Adam Vinatieri kick), 8:13. Patriots 21–13. Drive: 14 plays, 76 yards, 6:47.
- IND – Dan Klecko 1-yard pass from Manning (Marvin Harrison pass from Peyton Manning), 4:00. Tied 21–21. Drive: 6 plays, 76 yards, 2:50.
- NE – Jabar Gaffney 6-yard pass from Tom Brady (Stephen Gostkowski kick), 1:25. Patriots 28–21. Drive: 5 plays, 21 yards, 1:25.

Fourth quarter

- IND – Jeff Saturday fumble recovery in end zone for touchdown (Adam Vinatieri kick), 13:24. Tied 28–28. Drive: 7 plays, 67 yards, 3:01.
- NE – Stephen Gostkowski 28-yard field goal, 7:45. Patriots 31–28. Drive: 6 plays, 33 yards, 2:44.
- IND – Adam Vinatieri 36-yard field goal, 5:35. Tied 31–31. Drive: 5 plays, 59 yards, 2:11.
- NE – Stephen Gostkowski 43-yard field goal, 3:53. Patriots 34–31. Drive: 5 plays, 29 yards, 1:42.
- IND – Joseph Addai 3-yard run (Adam Vinatieri kick), 1:00. Colts 38–34. Drive: 7 plays, 80 yards, 1:17.

== Final roster ==
2006 New England Patriots roster
| Quarterbacks (QB): 12 Tom Brady; 16 Matt Cassel; 14 Vinny Testaverde; Running backs (RB): 28 Corey Dillon; 44 Heath Evans FB; 33 Kevin Faulk; 39 Laurence Maroney KR; Wide receivers (WR): 80 Troy Brown; 87 Reche Caldwell; 13 Bam Childress; 10 Jabar Gaffney; 17 Chad Jackson PR; 19 Kelvin Kight; Tight ends (TE): 82 Daniel Graham; 86 David Thomas; 84 Ben Watson | Offensive linemen (OL): 65 Wesley Britt T; 71 Russ Hochstein C/G; 77 Nick Kaczur T; 67 Dan Koppen C; 72 Matt Light T; 70 Logan Mankins G; 64 Gene Mruczkowski G; 61 Stephen Neal G; 68 Ryan O'Callaghan T; Defensive linemen (DL): 97 Jarvis Green DE; 91 Marquise Hill DE; 93 Richard Seymour DE; 90 Le Kevin Smith NT; 94 Ty Warren DE; 75 Vince Wilfork NT; 99 Mike Wright NT | Linebackers (LB): 52 Eric Alexander ILB; 95 Tully Banta-Cain OLB; 54 Tedy Bruschi ILB; 59 Rosevelt Colvin OLB; 53 Larry Izzo ILB; 46 Corey Mays ILB; 50 Mike Vrabel LB; 58 Pierre Woods OLB; Defensive backs (DB): 23 Willie Andrews SS; 32 Rashad Baker FS; 37 Rodney Harrison SS; 25 Artrell Hawkins FS; 27 Ellis Hobbs; 38 Ray Mickens CB; 22 Asante Samuel CB; 36 James Sanders SS; 30 Chad Scott CB; 31 Antwain Spann CB; Special teams (ST): 3 Stephen Gostkowski K; 66 Lonie Paxton LS; 18 Todd Sauerbrun P | Practice squad: 62 Brian Barthelmes C; 5 Danny Baugher P; 76 Sean Bubin T; 41 Quadtrine Hill FB; 85 Matt Kranchick TE; 1 Tom Malone P; 29 James Patrick CB; 92 Santonio Thomas; 81 Rod Trafford TE (IR); Reserve: -- Earl Charles RB (IR); 51 Don Davis LB (IR); 47 Barry Gardner LB (IR); 21 Randall Gay CB (IR); 34 Tebucky Jones S (IR); 15 Michael McGrew WR (Left squad); 8 Josh Miller P (IR); 45 Garrett Mills TE (IR); 24 Mel Mitchell S (IR); 35 Patrick Pass RB (IR); 55 Junior Seau LB (IR); -- Zuriel Smith WR (IR); 41 Ray Ventrone SS (IR); 15 Ken Walter P (IR); 42 Gemara Williams CB (IR); 26 Eugene Wilson S (IR); 74 Billy Yates C (IR); Rookies in italics 53 active, 14 reserve, 7 practice squad |

== Awards and honors ==
Numerous players were the recipients of awards for their performances in the 2006 regular season:

| Recipient | Award(s) |
|---|---|
| Tom Brady | Week 8: FedEx Express NFL Player of the Week |
| Jarvis Green | 2006 New England Patriots Ron Burton Community Service; Week 4: NFL Defensive Player of the Week |
| Rodney Harrison | 2006 New England Patriots Ed Block Courage Award |
| Laurence Maroney | Week 4: FedEx Ground NFL Player of the Week; Week 4: Diet Pepsi NFL Rookie of the Week; Week 7: NFL Special Teams Player of the Week; 2006 New England Patriots 12th Player Award |
| Asante Samuel | Week 12: NFL Defensive Player of the Week |
| Ty Warren | December: NFL Defensive Player of the Month |

=== Pro Bowl selections ===
Patriots offensive tackle Matt Light and defensive end Richard Seymour were both named to the AFC team in the 2007 Pro Bowl. Seymour was an original selection but did not participate in the game due to an injury. Light was named as an injury replacement to Tarik Glenn four days before the game. Quarterback Tom Brady reportedly declined an invitation to the play in the game, favoring the 2007 AT&T Pebble Beach National Pro-Am golf tournament instead.
