= Steitz =

Steitz is a German locational surname, which originally meant a person from Steitz in Sachsen-Anhalt, Germany. The name may refer to:

- Ed Steitz (1920–1990), American basketball coach
- Joan A. Steitz (born 1941), American biologist
- Nick Steitz (born 1982), American football player
- Thomas A. Steitz (1940–2018), American chemist
