= Kelvin Kight =

American football player (born 1982)

No. 13, 19
- Position: Wide receiver

Personal information
- Born: July 2, 1982 (age 44); Atlanta, Georgia, U.S.
- Listed height: 6 ft 0 in (1.83 m)
- Listed weight: 210 lb (95 kg)

Career information
- High school: Lithonia (GA)
- College: Florida
- NFL draft: 2004: undrafted

Career history
- St. Louis Rams (2004)*; Green Bay Packers (2004); Frankfurt Galaxy (2005); Jacksonville Jaguars (2005)*; Minnesota Vikings (2005–2006)*; New England Patriots (2006)
- * Offseason or practice squad member only
- Stats at Pro Football Reference

Kelvin Jerome Kight (born July 2, 1982) is an American former professional football player who was a wide receiver in the National Football League (NFL). Kight played college football for the Florida Gators, and thereafter, he played in the NFL for the Green Bay Packer and New England Patriots.

== Early life ==
Kight was born in Atlanta, Georgia. He attended Lithonia High School in Lithonia, Georgia, and played high school football for the Lithonia Bulldogs.

== College career ==
Kight accepted an athletic scholarship to attend the University of Florida in Gainesville, Florida, where he played for coach Steve Spurrier and coach Ron Zook's Gators teams from 2000 to 2003. Memorably, he caught six passes for 132 yards against the Florida State Seminoles in 2002. As a senior in 2003, he led the Gators with thirty-nine receptions for a total of 591 yards.

== Professional career ==
Kight was originally signed as an undrafted free agent by the St. Louis Rams in 2004. Over his career, he was also a member of the Green Bay Packers, the Jacksonville Jaguars, and the Minnesota Vikings and the New England Patriots. In Week 16 of the 2006 season, versus the Jacksonville Jaguars, Kight caught his first career catch on the first play of the game for the Patriots. He was waived by the team on September 1, 2007.
