= Gemara Williams =

American gridiron football player (born 1983)

No. 42, 43, 3
- Position: Defensive back

Personal information
- Born: April 30, 1983 (age 43); Oak Park, Michigan, U.S.
- Listed height: 5 ft 8 in (1.73 m)
- Listed weight: 195 lb (88 kg)

Career information
- High school: Brother Rice
- College: Buffalo

Career history
- 2006–2007: New England Patriots
- 2008–2009: Montreal Alouettes
- 2009–2010: Edmonton Eskimos
- Stats at CFL.ca

Gemara La'Juan Williams (born April 30, 1983) is an American former professional football player who saw action in the NFL and CFL. He was signed by the New England Patriots in 2006 and was later placed on season-ending injury reserve. He saw minimal action in 2007 and 2008 on special teams and defense. Williams known as a speedster for his 4.2 speed, played college football at Buffalo.

Williams also played for the Montreal Alouettes and Edmonton Eskimos.

== Professional career ==
=== New England Patriots ===
Williams was signed as an undrafted free agent out of the University at Buffalo after the 2006 NFL draft by the Patriots but was released before training camp. Williams re-signed on August 12, 2006, only to be placed on season-ending injured reserve at the start of the 2006 season. In 2007 Williams was part of the Patriots 18–1 season contributing as a kick returner and nickel back.

=== Edmonton Eskimos ===
After suffering an ACL injury with the Montreal Alouettes, Williams was signed to the Edmonton Eskimos on September 1, 2009, to finish his remaining years with the Eskimos.
