= Don Davis (linebacker) =

American football player and coach (born 1972)

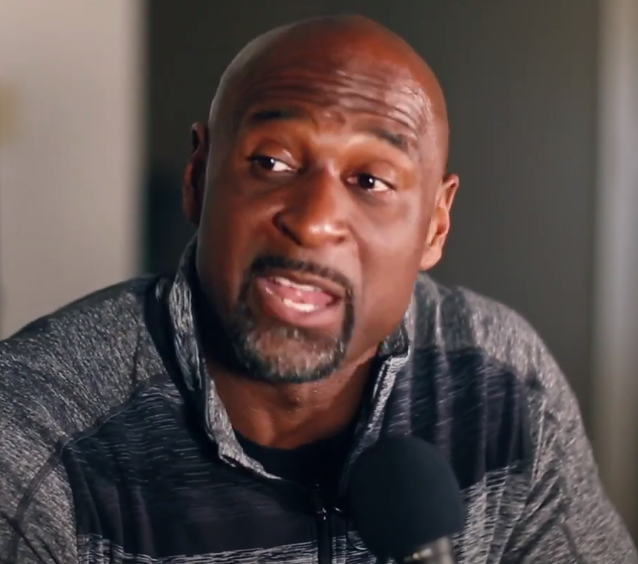
- Davis in 2022

No. 53, 58, 51
- Position: Linebacker

Personal information
- Born: December 17, 1972 (age 53); Olathe, Kansas, U.S.
- Listed height: 6 ft 1 in (1.85 m)
- Listed weight: 235 lb (107 kg)

Career information
- High school: Olathe South
- College: Kansas
- NFL draft: 1995: undrafted

Career history

Playing
- New York Jets (1995)*; Kansas City Chiefs (1995-1996)*; New Orleans Saints (1996–1998); Tampa Bay Buccaneers (1998–2000); St. Louis Rams (2001–2002); New England Patriots (2003–2006)
- * Offseason or practice squad member only

Coaching
- New England Patriots (2007) (Assistant strength and conditioning coach)

Awards and highlights
- 2× Super Bowl champion (XXXVIII, XXXIX); Second-team All-Big Eight (1994)

Career NFL statistics
- Tackles: 196
- Interceptions: 1
- Forced fumbles: 1
- Fumble recoveries: 2
- Stats at Pro Football Reference

Donald Earl Davis Jr. (born December 17, 1972) is an American former professional football player who was a linebacker in the National Football League (NFL). He played college football for the Kansas Jayhawks. After his playing career, he was a team chaplain for the New England Patriots.

== Early life ==
Davis attended Olathe South High School in Olathe, Kansas, and was a student and a letterman in football, basketball, and track & field. In football, as a senior, he was a first-team All-League selection and a second-team All-Metropolitan selection.

== College career ==
Davis was a three-year starter for the University of Kansas, and finished his superb career with 238 tackles (20 tackles for loss) and 9.5 sacks. Don Davis graduated with a degree in Human Development in 1995.

== NFL playing career ==
He was signed as a free agent in 1996 season by the New Orleans Saints. Davis played with the Saints until the middle of the 1998 season when he was traded to the Tampa Bay Buccaneers. He would remain with Tampa Bay through the 2000 season. In 2001 Davis began play for the St. Louis Rams, where he would remain through 2002. Then in 2003 Davis was signed by his final team, the New England Patriots, whom he would stay with for four seasons. He earned two Super Bowl rings with the New England Patriots in 2003 and 2004.

== Coaching career ==
Following the 2006 season, Davis retired and joined the Patriots' strength and conditioning coaches as an assistant coach. He left the organization prior to the 2008 season to pursue Christian ministry. He remained with the Patriots as the team chaplain. He is currently the National Football League Players Association's Chief Player Officer.
