= Ty Warren =

American football player and coach (born 1981)

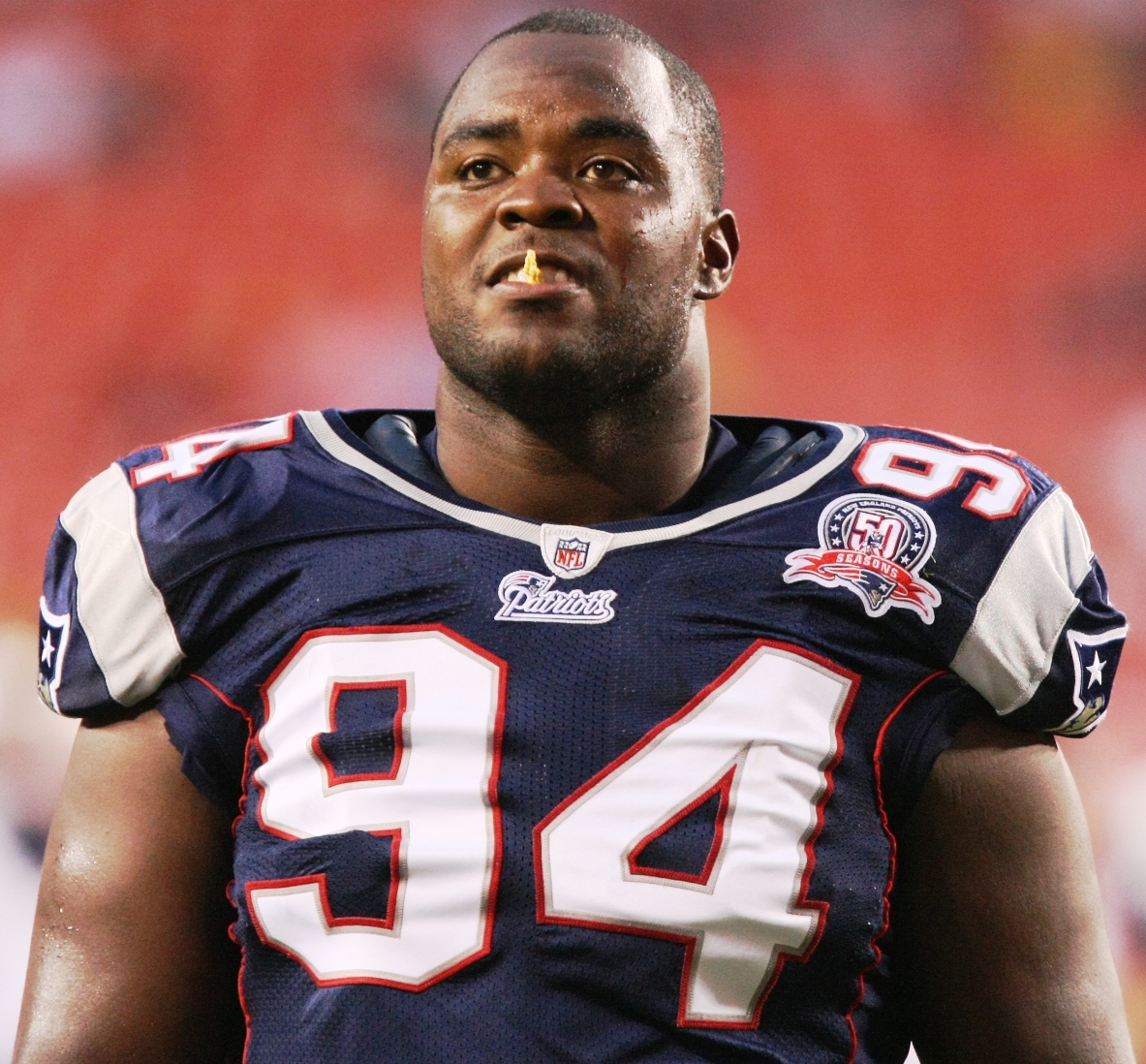
- Warren with the New England Patriots in 2009

Mississippi State Bulldogs
- Title: Defensive line coach

Personal information
- Born: February 6, 1981 (age 45); Bryan, Texas, U.S.
- Listed height: 6 ft 5 in (1.96 m)
- Listed weight: 300 lb (136 kg)

Career information
- High school: Bryan
- College: Texas A&M
- NFL draft: 2003: 1st round, 13th overall pick

Career history

Playing
- New England Patriots (2003–2010); Denver Broncos (2011–2012)

Coaching
- Detroit Lions (2019) Volunteer assistant; Detroit Lions (2020) WCF minority coaching assistantship/defense; Houston Gamblers (2022) Defensive line coach; Orlando Guardians (2023) Defensive line coach; Stephen F. Austin (2023–2024) Defensive line coach; Rice (2025) Defensive line coach; Mississippi State (2026–present) Defensive line coach

Awards and highlights
- 2× Super Bowl champion (XXXVIII, XXXIX); First-team All-Pro (2007); New England Patriots All-2000s Team; New England Patriots All-Dynasty Team; Second-team All-Big 12 (2002); Ron Burton Community Service Award (2007)

Career NFL statistics
- Total tackles: 376
- Sacks: 20.5
- Forced fumbles: 4
- Fumble recoveries: 6
- Stats at Pro Football Reference

Ty'ron Markeith Warren (born February 6, 1981) is an American former professional football player who was a defensive end for 10 seasons in the National Football League (NFL), primarily with the New England Patriots. He played college football for the Texas A&M Aggies from 2000 to 2003. He was selected by the Patriots in the first round of the 2003 NFL draft. A first-team All-Pro selection in 2007 and two-time Super Bowl-winner during his eight seasons with New England, he was named to the Patriots All-2000s Team in 2010.

== Early life ==
Warren was raised in Bryan, Texas by his single mother and maternal grandparents. His family was poor, therefore he helped raise his siblings and worked odd jobs from an early age. At the local Boys and Girls Club, he met his wife, Kesha Drayton, with whom he has six daughters, two of them being twins. Warren continues to give back to his hometown. His uncle, Curtis Dickey, was an All-American tailback at Texas A&M (1976–79), where he ranks second on the career rushing list and was selected in the first round of the 1980 NFL draft by the Baltimore Colts.

Warren attended Bryan High School, where he was a letterman in both football and track. In football, he was a standout at defensive end and finished his career with 22 sacks, 248 tackles (69 for losses), and 90 quarterback hurries. As a senior, he won first team All-State honors and posted nine sacks and 109 tackles. Warren took his first airplane trip when he flew to California to play for an all-star game. Warren graduated from Bryan High in 1999.

== College career ==
Warren attended Texas A&M University, where he majored in agricultural development and played for the Texas A&M Aggies football team from 1999 to 2002. In football, he played across the defensive line in his career, starting games at both defensive end and tackle. After appearing in five games as a freshman in 1999, Warren started the last eight games of his sophomore season in 2000, finishing the year with 38 tackles and five sacks while leading the team in tackles for a loss. He moved to defensive tackle in 2001, starting seven games there en route to an All-Big 12 Conference first-team selection. In his senior season in 2002, Warren moved back to defensive end, starting 10 games and recording 52 tackles. He finished his college career with 144 tackles and 13.5 sacks, plus two blocked field goals.

In the 2010 NFL offseason, Ty Warren went back to Texas A&M to finish his degree, and graduated in May 2011, becoming the first college graduate in his family.

== Professional career ==
=== New England Patriots ===
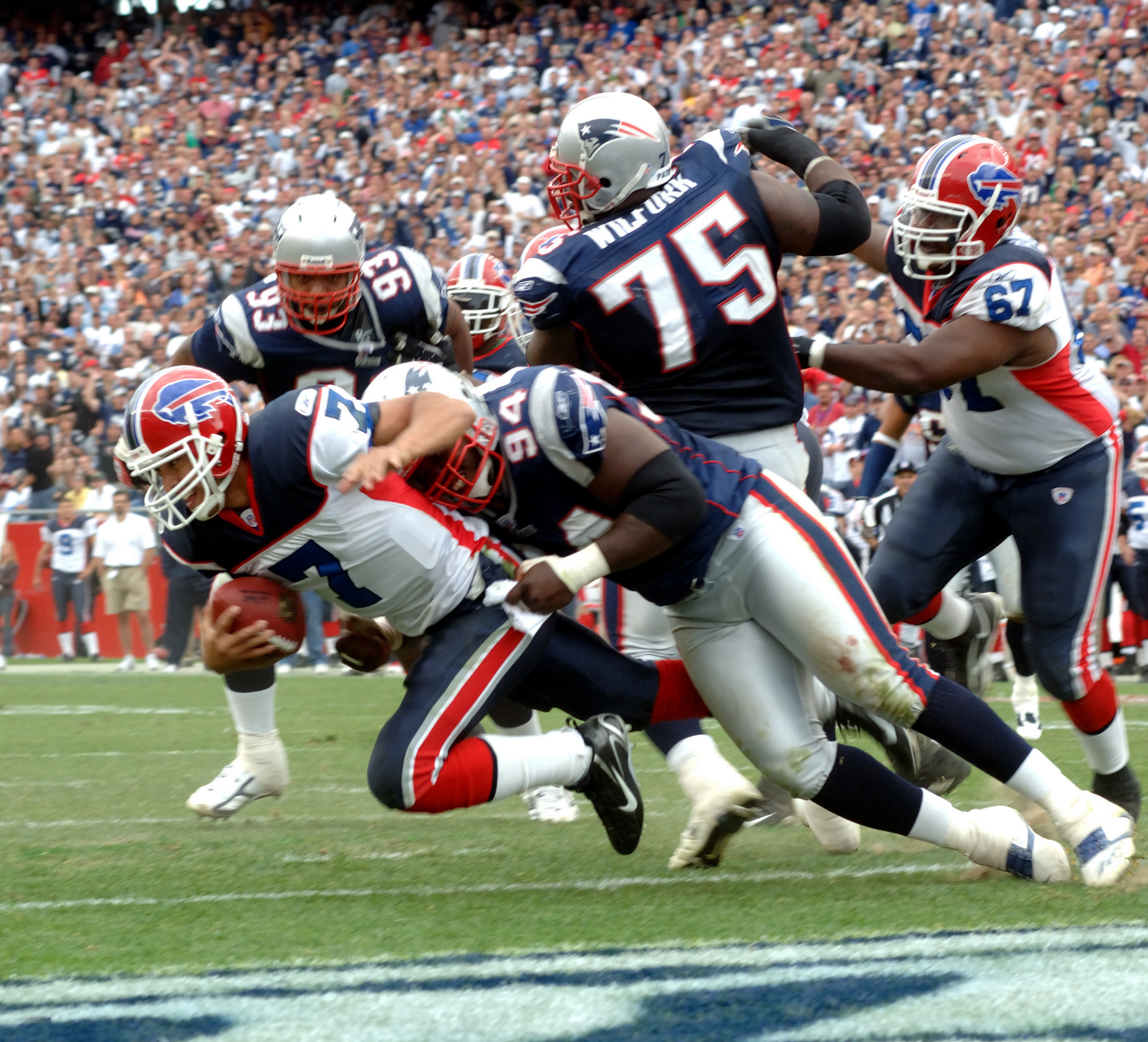
Warren sacks Bills quarterback J. P. Losman for a game-winning safety in 2006

Patriots head coach Bill Belichick and his scouts were so impressed by Warren's college performance that they made a trade in order to get him at No. 13 in the first round of the 2003 NFL draft. Warren played in all 16 games in the 2003 season, starting four times and recording 33 tackles and one sack. Warren collected his first career sack when he sacked Miami Dolphins quarterback Jay Fiedler for a 1-yard loss in the first quarter of the Patriots' 19–13 overtime victory on October 13. Warren earned his first Super Bowl ring playing as a reserve in the Patriots' victory over the Carolina Panthers in Super Bowl XXXVIII. In the 2004 season, Warren became a starter at defensive end in the Patriots' 3-4 system and played in all 16 games, and recorded 48 tackles and 3.5 sacks. He played in Super Bowl XXXIX against the Philadelphia Eagles and earned his second Super Bowl ring for the Patriots' victory. In 2005, Warren again started all 16 games at defensive end, picking up 68 tackles and 1.5 sacks. Warren improved his statistics in 2006, recording a career-high of 84 tackles (56 solo), 1 safety and 7.5 sacks. He was named to Sports Illustrated writer Peter King's All-Pro team, but not the Pro Bowl. Following the season, Warren was named among the players who should have made the Pro Bowl, and among the more underrated players in the NFL.

Warren's teammates elected him a team captain before the 2007 season. On August 16, 2007, he signed a five-year contract extension with the Patriots through 2013. The contract has a maximum value of $35 million and guaranteed $18 million. In 2007, Warren ranked second in the team in tackles (83), quarterback hits (15), and fumble recoveries (3). He made four sacks.

In a press conference the week before Super Bowl XLII in February 2008, Patriots head coach Bill Belichick praised Warren's work ethic, attitude, and leadership. Belichick also pointed out that Warren had worked the hardest and had done nothing but work hard to improve since he was drafted in 2003. When Warren received his five-year contract extension, Belichick simply told him "Congratulations, get back to work."

Warren's 2008 season was reduced to 13 games because of a groin injury that caused Warren to miss three games in November and December, only the second season in which Warren had missed time due to injury. Warren finished the season with 41 tackles and two sacks. In early 2009, Warren had surgery to repair the groin injury as well as a prior sports hernia injury.

Warren started the first eight games of 2009 before he missed a Week 10 matchup against the Indianapolis Colts with an ankle injury. He left a Week 14 game against the Carolina Panthers with an ankle injury and did not play in the Patriots' final three games; he started the Patriots' playoff loss to the Baltimore Ravens. He finished the regular season with 46 tackles and one sack.

After suffering a hip injury during training camp, Warren was placed on injured reserve on August 13, 2010, ending his season. On July 29, 2011, it was announced that Warren had been released by the New England Patriots.

=== Denver Broncos ===
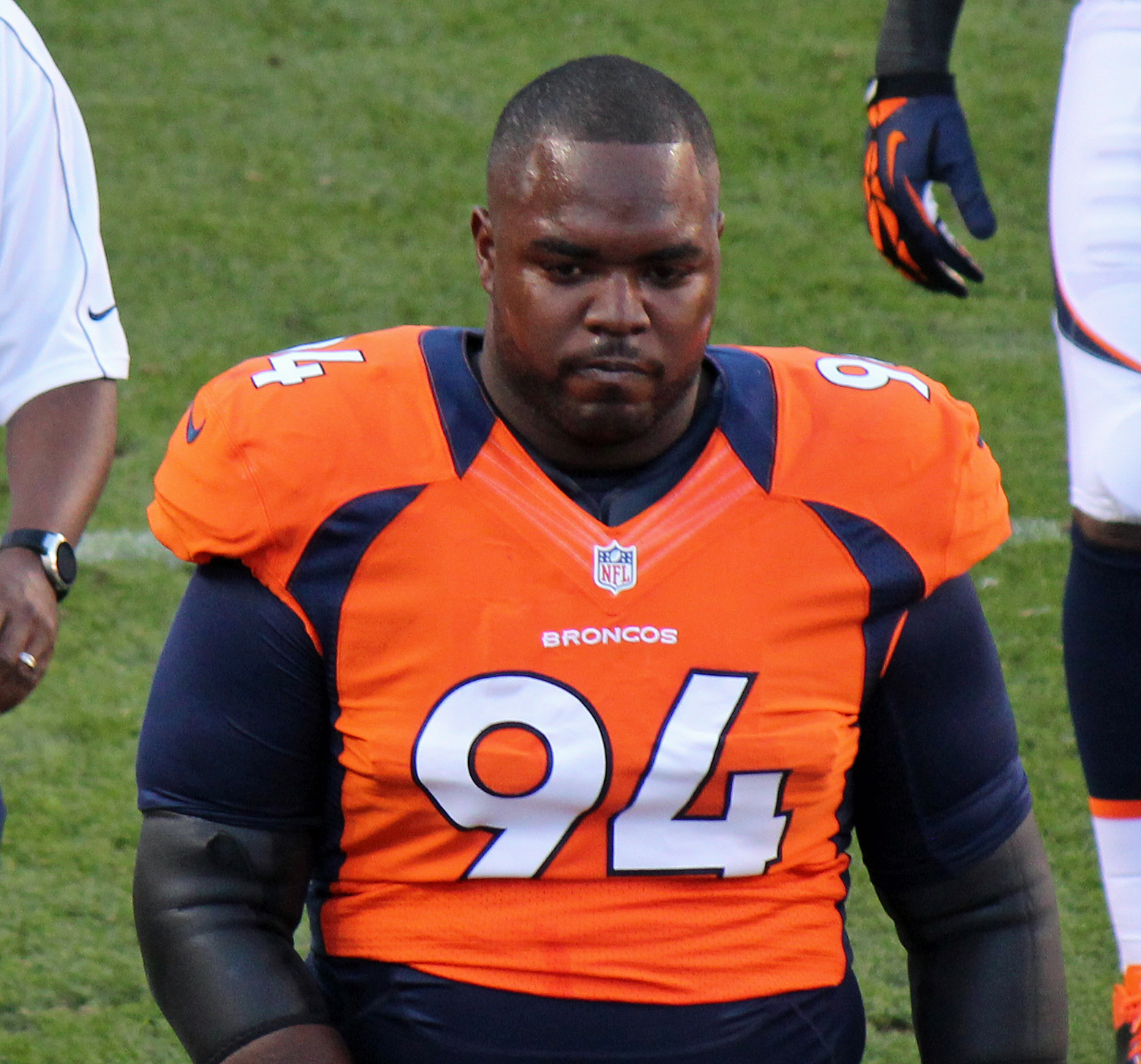
Warren during the 2012 NFL season

On August 2, 2011, he was signed by the Denver Broncos. He missed the entire 2011–2012 season with a triceps injury suffered early in training camp. After being asked by the Broncos to take a pay cut, he held out of the team's Organized Team Activities until June 6, 2012, when the Broncos and Warren agreed to a restructured contract. On September 7, 2012 (week 1 of the regular season) he tore his triceps again and missed the rest of the 2012 season. Warren did not sign with any team after the 2012 season.

== NFL career statistics ==
Legend
| | Won the Super Bowl |
| **Bold** | Career high |

=== Regular season ===
| Year | Team | GP | Tackles | | | | Fumbles | | | Interceptions | | | | | | |
| Year | Team | GP | Cmb | Solo | Ast | Sck | FF | FR | Yds | TD | Int | Yds | Avg | Lng | TD | PD |
|---|---|---|---|---|---|---|---|---|---|---|---|---|---|---|---|---|
| 2003 | NE | 16 | 33 | 19 | 14 | 1.0 | 0 | 0 | 0 | 0 | 0 | 0 | 0.0 | 0 | 0 | 2 |
| 2004 | NE | 16 | 48 | 38 | 10 | 3.5 | 2 | 0 | 0 | 0 | 0 | 0 | 0.0 | 0 | 0 | 1 |
| 2005 | NE | 16 | 68 | 40 | 28 | 1.5 | 0 | 1 | 5 | 0 | 0 | 0 | 0.0 | 0 | 0 | 1 |
| 2006 | NE | 15 | 84 | 56 | 28 | 7.5 | 1 | 1 | 0 | 0 | 0 | 0 | 0.0 | 0 | 0 | 4 |
| 2007 | NE | 16 | 53 | 34 | 19 | 4.0 | 0 | 3 | 0 | 0 | 0 | 0 | 0.0 | 0 | 0 | 0 |
| 2008 | NE | 13 | 41 | 32 | 9 | 2.0 | 1 | 1 | 8 | 0 | 0 | 0 | 0.0 | 0 | 0 | 0 |
| 2009 | NE | 13 | 46 | 33 | 13 | 1.0 | 0 | 0 | 0 | 0 | 0 | 0 | 0.0 | 0 | 0 | 1 |
| 2012 | DEN | 1 | 1 | 1 | 0 | 0.0 | 0 | 0 | 0 | 0 | 0 | 0 | 0.0 | 0 | 0 | 0 |
| Career | | 106 | 374 | 253 | 121 | 20.5 | 4 | 6 | 13 | 0 | 0 | 0 | 0.0 | 0 | 0 | 9 |

== Coaching career ==
Warren was hired as a William Clay Ford minority coaching assistant for the Detroit Lions in 2020. He was the interim defensive line coach for the team's week 16 game in 2020 against the Tampa Bay Buccaneers due to Bo Davis missing the game under COVID-19 protocols. He is currently serving as a preseason coaching intern with the New Orleans Saints as part of the NFL's minority coach internship program.

Warren was officially hired by the Orlando Guardians on September 13, 2022 He was no longer a part of the staff on March 20, 2023.

On December 28, 2025, Warren was hired as the defensive line coach for the Mississippi State Bulldogs.
