= Le Kevin Smith =

American football player (born 1982)

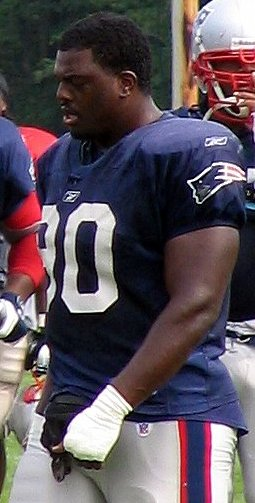
- Smith with the New England Patriots in 2007

No. 90, 97
- Position: Defensive tackle

Personal information
- Born: July 21, 1982 (age 44); Macon, Georgia, U.S.
- Listed height: 6 ft 3 in (1.91 m)
- Listed weight: 308 lb (140 kg)

Career information
- High school: Stratford Academy (Macon)
- College: Nebraska
- NFL draft: 2006: 6th round, 206th overall pick

Career history
- New England Patriots (2006–2008); Denver Broncos (2009–2010)

Awards and highlights
- The Sporting News Freshman All-Big 12 (2002)

Career NFL statistics
- Total tackles: 23
- Sacks: 1
- Fumble recoveries: 1
- Stats at Pro Football Reference

Le Kevin Smith (born July 21, 1982) is an American former professional football player who was a defensive tackle in the National Football League (NFL), who played five seasons from 2006 to 2010. He was selected by the New England Patriots in the sixth round of the 2006 NFL draft. Smith was a member of the Patriots' 2007 16–0 team and recorded half a sack during Super Bowl XLII. He ended his NFL career in 2010 with the Denver Broncos. He played college football for the Nebraska Cornhuskers.

== Early life ==
Smith attended Stratford Academy in Macon, Georgia, where he helped Stratford win three Class 3A titles state titles as a defensive lineman. He was the USA Today Georgia Player of the Year and was a Rivals.com All-American. He also lettered in track and field, winning four state titles in the discus and two in the shot put. It is noted that during his senior year, the Macon Telegraph called him the "real deal" after he dominated rival Tattnall Square Academy's star center Brandon Dillard.

== College career ==
After graduating from high school, Smith attended the University of Nebraska–Lincoln. After redshirting in 2001, Smith played in all 14 games in 2002. As a sophomore in 2003, Smith started all 12 games at defensive tackle, recording 44 tackles. He moved to nose guard in 2004, and was an All-Big 12 honorable mention after recording 43 tackles and 2.5 sacks. In his 2005 senior season, Smith set a career high with six sacks while starting all 11 games at defensive tackle. He finished his college career with 36 tackles for a loss, the second-highest total for a defensive lineman in Nebraska history. Smith graduated with a degree in construction management.

== Professional career ==
Pre-draft measurables
Height	Weight	Arm length	Hand span	40-yard dash	10-yard split	20-yard split	20-yard shuttle	Three-cone drill	Vertical jump	Broad jump	Bench press
6 ft 2 7/8 in (1.90 m)	316 lb (143 kg)	32 1/8 in (0.82 m)	9 1/2 in (0.24 m)	4.99 s	1.80 s	2.97 s	4.92 s	7.93 s	30.5 in (0.77 m)	9 ft 1 in (2.77 m)	30 reps
All values from NFL Combine

=== New England Patriots ===
Smith was selected by the New England Patriots in the sixth round (206th overall) in the 2006 NFL draft. He was inactive or did not play in all but three games of his rookie season in 2006. He appeared in 13 games in 2007, seeing time as a reserve defensive lineman and on special teams. Smith was active for 15 games in 2007, recording a career-high 14 tackles. He also was a member of the Patriots' kickoff return unit, which blocked for Ellis Hobbs' 96-yard return against the Oakland Raiders in Week 15. The biggest play of his career came during Super Bowl XLII when Smith recorded half a sack on Eli Manning. Smith recorded a career high 14 tackles during the 2008 season. On August 17, 2009, Smith's career as a Patriot came to an end when he was traded to the Denver Broncos on the last day of training camp. Smith ended his career with the Patriots totaling 28 tackles and 1 fumble recovery in 31 games played.

=== Denver Broncos ===
Smith was acquired by the Denver Broncos on August 17, 2009, along with a seventh-round pick in the 2010 NFL draft for the Broncos' fifth-round pick in the 2010 draft. Smith recorded 10 tackles and 1 sack during the 2009 season. He was released on September 7, 2010, re-signed in late October before being cut once more on November 9.

=== Retirement ===
During the 2011 lockout, Smith went to his doctor for a "random MRI test". Unfortunately, the doctor told Smith that he had sustained a neck injury and found 3 bulging spinal disc and spinal cord damage at his C3/C4. In April 2012 Smith had an Anterior Cervical Discectomy and Fusion. Four months after surgery, Smith fully recovered from the neck fusion. Doctors said he could go back to physical training and exercise, but he could never play football again because he was a lineman and would put himself at too much risk of permanently damaging his spinal cord and cause Tetraplegia (Paralysis from the neck down). Smith informed the NFL about his retirement and is no longer a player for the league.
