= Antwain Spann =

American football player (born 1983)

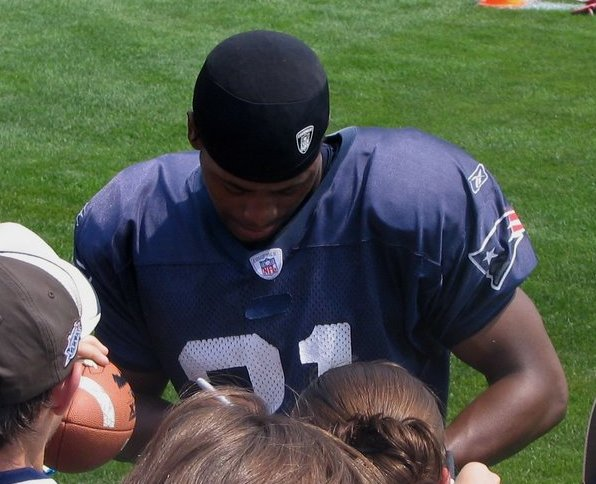
- Spann with the New England Patriots in 2006

No. 23
- Positions: Cornerback, safety

Personal information
- Born: February 22, 1983 (age 43); Oceanside, California, U.S.
- Listed height: 6 ft 0 in (1.83 m)
- Listed weight: 195 lb (88 kg)

Career information
- High school: El Camino (Oceanside)
- College: Louisiana–Lafayette
- NFL draft: 2005: undrafted

Career history
- New York Giants (2005)*; New England Patriots (2005–2008); → Rhein Fire (2006); Buffalo Bills (2009)*; Denver Broncos (2009)*; Florida Tuskers (2010)*
- * Offseason or practice squad member only

Career NFL statistics
- Tackles: 13
- Stats at Pro Football Reference

Antwain Joquan Spann (born February 22, 1983) is an American former professional football player who was a defensive back for the New England Patriots of the National Football League (NFL). He was signed by the New York Giants as an undrafted free agent in 2005. He played college football for the Louisiana–Lafayette Ragin' Cajuns.

Spann was also a member of the Rhein Fire, Buffalo Bills, Denver Broncos, and Florida Tuskers.

== Early life ==
Spann played football at El Camino High School in Oceanside, California.

== College career ==
Spann began his college football career in 2001 at Mississippi Gulf Coast Community College, where he was a Mississippi Junior College All-State and All-Region player. In 2003, he transferred to the University of Louisiana at Lafayette, where he started 11 games at cornerback in his senior season in 2004, recording a team-high four interceptions.

== Professional career ==
=== New York Giants ===
Spann was signed by the Giants as an undrafted free agent on May 17, 2005, following the 2005 NFL draft. He was waived by the Giants on August 31.

=== New England Patriots ===
Spann was signed to the Patriots' practice squad on January 2, 2006, where he spent the remainder of the team's postseason before being signed to a future contract by the team on January 17.

Spann was waived by the team on September 2, 2006, and signed to the Patriots' practice squad the following day. He was signed to the Patriots' 53-man roster on September 30 before being waived from it on November 7. He was re-signed to the Patriots' practice squad on November 8, and again elevated to the 53-man roster on November 18. He was waived by the Patriots on November 22 and re-signed to their practice squad again on November 24. He was signed to the team's 53-man roster for a third time on December 9, where he spent the remainder of the season.

Spann was waived by the team on July 19, 2007, and signed to the Patriots' practice squad on September 25. He then was signed to the Patriots' 53-man roster on December 28.

Spann was waived by the Patriots again on August 30, 2008, and signed to the team's practice squad on September 1. He was elevated to the 53-man roster on October 22 when safety Rodney Harrison was placed on injured reserve.

Spann was waived by the Patriots on July 27, 2009, after signing 2009 draft pick Patrick Chung.

=== Buffalo Bills ===
Spann signed with the Buffalo Bills on July 31, 2009. He was briefly waived on August 7 before being re-signed on August 11. He was waived again on August 21 when 2009 first-round pick Aaron Maybin was signed.

=== Denver Broncos ===
Spann was claimed off waivers by the Denver Broncos on August 24, 2009. He was waived on September 5.
