= Corey Mays =

American football player (born 1983)

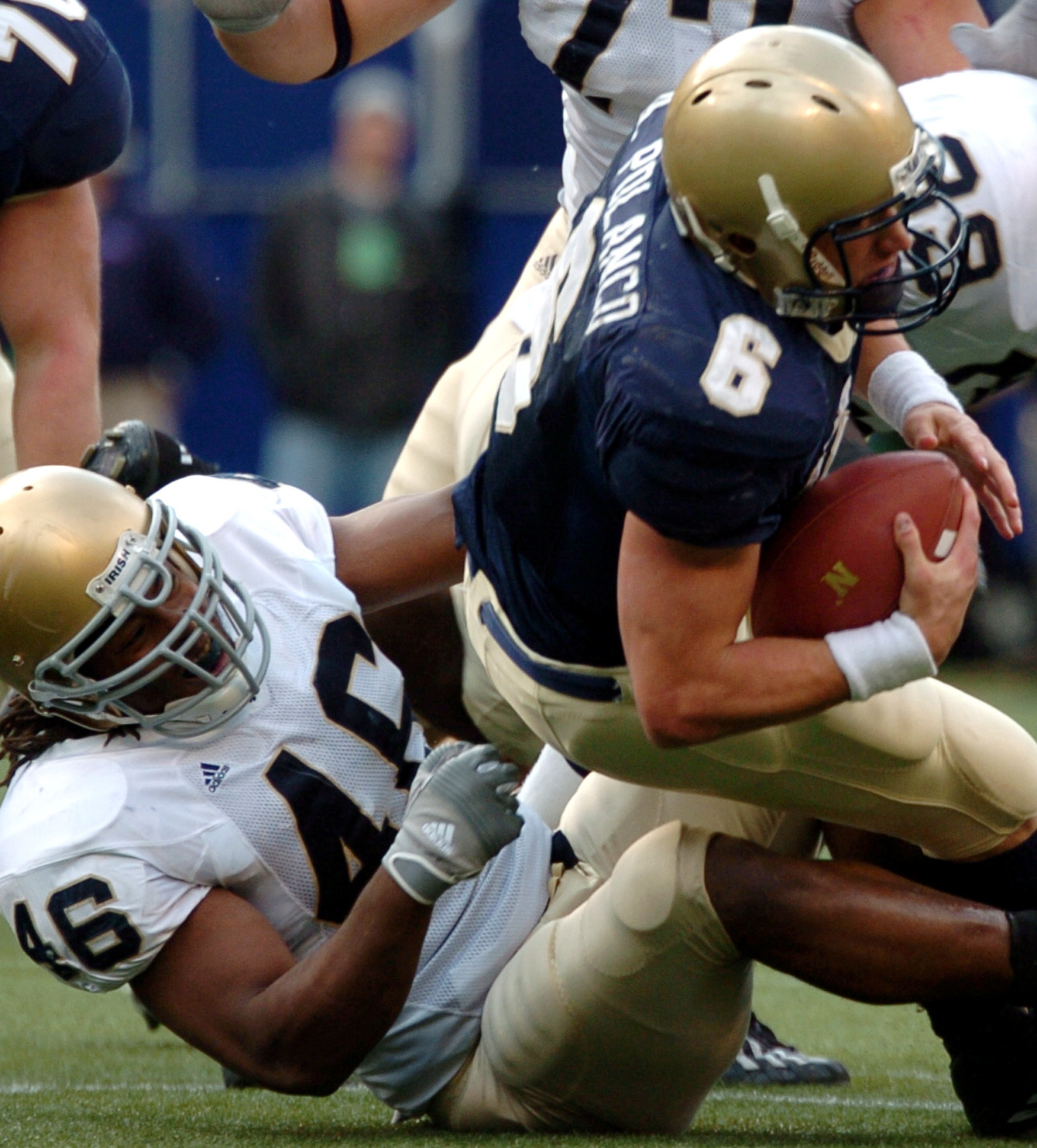
- Mays (left) tackles an opponent while playing for Notre Dame in 2004

No. 46, 51
- Position: Linebacker

Personal information
- Born: November 27, 1983 (age 42); Chicago, Illinois. U.S.
- Listed height: 6 ft 1 in (1.85 m)
- Listed weight: 245 lb (111 kg)

Career information
- College: Notre Dame
- NFL draft: 2006: undrafted

Career history
- New England Patriots (2006–2007); Cincinnati Bengals (2007–2008); Kansas City Chiefs (2009–2010)

Career NFL statistics
- Total tackles: 131
- Forced fumbles: 1
- Fumble recoveries: 1
- Pass deflections: 2
- Stats at Pro Football Reference

Corey Lernard Mays (born November 27, 1983) is an American former professional football player who was a linebacker in the National Football League (NFL). He played college football for the Notre Dame Fighting Irish and was signed by the New England Patriots as an undrafted free agent in 2006. Mays has also played for the Cincinnati Bengals and the Kansas City Chiefs.

== Early life ==
Mays earned All City, All Area and All State honors as a Senior. Mays capped off his senior year with the 2001 Gatorade Player of The Year honors for Illinois. Mays played high school football at Morgan Park High School in Chicago. Mays accepted a full scholarship offer to the University of Notre Dame, which was the first offer to a public league athlete since Chris Zorch.

== Professional career ==
Pre-draft measurables
Height	Weight
6 ft 0 1/8 in (1.83 m)	235 lb (107 kg)
Values from Pro Day

=== New England Patriots ===
Mays was first signed as an undrafted free agent out of the University of Notre Dame after the 2006 NFL draft. He started the 2006 season as a member of the New England Patriots practice squad, but was later signed to the active roster. He was cut by the Patriots on October 1, 2007.

=== Cincinnati Bengals ===
Mays signed with the Cincinnati Bengals on October 2, 2007, and went on to play two seasons with the team. He was non-tendered as a restricted free agent in the 2009 offseason.

=== Kansas City Chiefs ===
Mays was signed by the Kansas City Chiefs on March 13, 2009.
