= Johnathan Sullivan =

American football player (born 1981)

No. 97
- Position: Defensive tackle

Personal information
- Born: January 21, 1981 (age 45); Griffin, Georgia, U.S.
- Listed height: 6 ft 3 in (1.91 m)
- Listed weight: 315 lb (143 kg)

Career information
- High school: Griffin (Griffin, Georgia)
- College: Georgia (2000–2002)
- NFL draft: 2003: 1st round, 6th overall pick

Career history
- New Orleans Saints (2003–2005); New England Patriots (2006)

Awards and highlights
- PFWA All-Rookie Team (2003); First-team All-SEC (2002)

Career NFL statistics
- Tackles: 78
- Sacks: 1.5
- Passes defended: 3
- Forced fumbles: 1
- Stats at Pro Football Reference

Johnathan Lamar Sullivan (born January 21, 1981) is an American former professional football player who was a defensive tackle in the National Football League (NFL). He played college football at Georgia and was selected sixth overall by the New Orleans Saints in the 2003 NFL draft.

== Professional career ==
Sullivan was selected sixth overall by the New Orleans Saints in the 2003 NFL draft.

In the 2004 preseason, Sullivan reported to training camp out of shape, at nearly 350 pounds, and lost his starting job. Sullivan was inactive for the final eight games of the 2004 season due to a combination of poor play, bad attitude and lackluster work ethic. When Sullivan was inactive for a game against the Atlanta Falcons, he appeared in the press box for the pregame meal.

In the 2005 preseason, Saints general manager Mickey Loomis pulled Sullivan out of a team meeting to tell him to improve his diet and behavior.

In June 2006, the Saints traded Sullivan to the New England Patriots in exchange for wide receiver Bethel Johnson. Neither Johnson nor Sullivan ever played for his new team, as Johnson was waived and signed with the Minnesota Vikings in September 2006. Sullivan never played for New England and was waived on October 9, 2006.

== Personal life ==
On June 26, 2006, Sullivan was stopped by police near Atlanta and charged with possession of less than an ounce of marijuana, among other charges.
