= Chad Jackson =

American football player (born 1985)

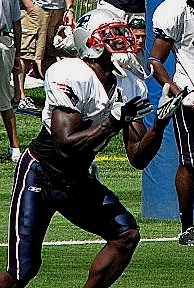
- Jackson at the Patriots' 2008 training camp

No. 16, 17
- Position: Wide receiver

Personal information
- Born: March 6, 1985 (age 41); Birmingham, Alabama, U.S.
- Listed height: 6 ft 1 in (1.85 m)
- Listed weight: 210 lb (95 kg)

Career information
- High school: Hoover (Hoover, Alabama)
- College: Florida (2003–2005)
- NFL draft: 2006: 2nd round, 36th overall pick

Career history
- New England Patriots (2006–2007); Denver Broncos (2008); Buffalo Bills (2010)*; Omaha Nighthawks (2011)*; Oakland Raiders (2011)*; Omaha Nighthawks (2011)
- * Offseason or practice squad member only

Awards and highlights
- First-team All-SEC (2005)

Career NFL statistics
- Receptions: 14
- Receiving yards: 171
- Receiving touchdowns: 3
- Stats at Pro Football Reference

Chad Wolfegang Jackson (born March 6, 1985) is an American former professional football player who was a wide receiver for three seasons in the National Football League (NFL). He played college football for the Florida Gators. Jackson was selected by the New England Patriots in the second round of the 2006 NFL draft, and also played for the Denver Broncos of the NFL, and the Omaha Nighthawks of the United Football League (UFL).

== Early life ==
Jackson was born in Birmingham, Alabama in 1985. He was a three-year starter at football powerhouse Hoover High School in Birmingham, where he recorded 202 receptions for 3,553 yards and forty touchdowns. Jackson also found time to pass and run for twelve more touchdowns and try his hand at free safety. His high school career ended with a 41–3 record and two Alabama Class 6A championships, and he was recognized as a Parade magazine prep All-American.

Jackson also played basketball and ran track before concentrating on football as a senior.

== College career ==
Jackson accepted an athletic scholarship to attend the University of Florida in Gainesville, Florida, where he played for coach Ron Zook and coach Urban Meyer's Florida Gators football teams from 2003 to 2005. As a junior in 2005, Jackson started eleven games and appeared in all twelve. He tied the Gators team record for receptions in a single season with eighty-eight, and led the Southeastern Conference (SEC). Jackson was a first-team All-SEC selection, an honorable mention All-American, and one of fifteen semi-finalists for the Biletnikoff Award in 2005. His eighty-eight catches went for 900 yards and nine touchdowns, and he also ran for two more rushing touchdowns. Following his junior season, Jackson declared that he would forgo his final year of NCAA eligibility and enter the NFL draft.

== Professional career ==
=== Pre-draft ===
Pre-draft measurables
Height	Weight	Arm length	Hand span	40-yard dash	10-yard split	20-yard split	20-yard shuttle	Three-cone drill	Vertical jump	Broad jump
6 ft 0 7/8 in (1.85 m)	213 lb (97 kg)	32 3/4 in (0.83 m)	9 1/4 in (0.23 m)	4.35 s	1.55 s	2.55 s	3.97 s	6.73 s	38.5 in (0.98 m)	10 ft 2 in (3.10 m)
All values from NFL Combine

=== New England Patriots ===
On the first day of the 2006 NFL draft, the Patriots traded draft picks with the Green Bay Packers to move up sixteen places (from the Patriots' 52nd to the Packers' 36th) in the second round to select Jackson, giving up a third-round pick (75th overall) acquired in a trade. Jackson played for the Patriots in 2006 and 2007.

Jackson missed the entire 2006 preseason with a hamstring injury; his first NFL game was in Week 2 of the 2006 season against the New York Jets, in which he caught two passes for a total of 42 yards; one of those was a 13-yard touchdown.

In Week 4, he caught two passes for a total of nine yards against the Cincinnati Bengals. His performance was limited due to his nagging hamstring injury. In Week 7, at Buffalo, Jackson recorded his fifth catch of the season, a 35-yard touchdown reception from Tom Brady in the third quarter. A few weeks later, Jackson suffered a groin injury and missed back-to-back games in December. Jackson finished his rookie season with 13 catches for 152 yards, six first downs and three touchdowns.

In the 2006 AFC Championship Game against the Indianapolis Colts, Jackson suffered a torn ACL and was placed on the Patriots' physically unable to perform (PUP) list prior to the 2007 season. He was activated from the PUP on November 7, 2007, but was active for only four of the Patriots' remaining games, finishing the season with one catch for 19 yards. Jackson was active for the Patriots' first playoff game against the Jacksonville Jaguars, but was a healthy inactive for their next two games, the AFC Championship and Super Bowl XLII.

On August 31, 2008, Jackson was released by the Patriots a day after the deadline for cutting rosters down to 53 players.

=== Denver Broncos ===
Jackson was signed by the Denver Broncos on October 27, 2008. During the 2008 season, he played in four games, making one catch for 19 yards and returning eight kickoffs (all on the same day, to tie a franchise record) for a combined 162 yards. Jackson made the Broncos' initial 53-man roster but was released by the Broncos on September 7, 2009.

=== Buffalo Bills ===
Jackson signed with the Buffalo Bills on March 31, 2010. He was released on September 4, 2010.

=== Omaha Nighthawks ===
Jackson was signed by the Omaha Nighthawks of the United Football League on June 29, 2011.

=== Oakland Raiders ===
On August 6, 2011, Jackson signed with the Oakland Raiders. Jackson was waived on September 3, 2011.

== See also ==
- History of the Denver Broncos
- List of Buffalo Bills players
- List of Florida Gators in the NFL draft
- List of New England Patriots players
