= Nick Steitz =

American football player (born 1982)

No. 55
- Position: Guard

Personal information
- Born: August 18, 1982 (age 44); Los Banos, California, U.S.
- Listed height: 6 ft 3 in (1.91 m)
- Listed weight: 306 lb (139 kg)

Career information
- College: Oregon

Career history
- New Orleans Saints (2005)*; New England Patriots (2006)*; Rhein Fire (2006); Washington Redskins (2006)*; San Francisco 49ers (2006); Grand Rapids Rampage (2008)
- * Offseason or practice squad member only

Nick Steitz (born August 18, 1982) is an American former football guard. He spent time with the Washington Redskins, the New England Patriots the San Francisco 49ers, and the Grand Rapids Rampage.
